= Jeremy Osbern =

American film director

Jeremy Osbern is an American director and director of photography.

== Biography ==
Jeremy Osbern first entered the film business at the age of 17, working as director and director of photography for the documentary Evaporated, which chronicled the lives of four people who were dying of smoking-related illness. All four subjects died shortly after filming was complete. Musician Ben Folds was so moved by the project he contributed the music for the piece. Evaporated was accepted into numerous film festivals and then picked up by for distribution in schools by the American Lung Association, as well as for use in smoking cessation clinics by the drug manufacturer GlaxoSmithKline.

At the age of 19, Osbern shot and directed a spec commercial for MTV. The commercial was purchased by the network used in heavy rotation during the early 2000s.

His first feature film as director and cinematographer was Air: The Musical. That film went on to be distributed across North America by Cinema Epoch, Taiwan by AVJet, and South Africa by M-Net.

In 2009, a Western Osbern shot on 35mm film, The Only Good Indian premiered at the Sundance Film Festival. In their review of the film, Variety specifically mentioned the film's "impressive 35mm lensing".

In 2010, Osbern was the director of photography for the Kansas City portion of the movie Red.

In 2011, Osbern collaborated with David Mamet when he directed the music video Disintegration Man for Mamet's wife, actress and musician Rebecca Pidgeon.

Osbern was the director of photography and executive producer of Jayhawkers, a feature-length period piece about Wilt Chamberlain and Phog Allen. The film debuted on Valentine's Day, February 14, 2014, and had one of the highest per-screen average ticket sales of the year.

In January 2015, COURTESAN, a film directed by Osbern and filmmaker Misti Boland premiered at the Slamdance Film Festival.

On February 12, 2015, There Will Be No Stay, a documentary that Osbern shot and produced through his company Through a Glass Productions premiered at the Big Sky Documentary Film Festival. Susan Sarandon recommended the film, saying it provides a "unique and powerful perspective" on the death penalty. The film was distributed through Film Buff and made available on iTunes, Amazon, Xbox, VUDU, and GooglePlay.

In January 2016, Osbern was tapped as a short film programmer and then as member of the Jury for the 2016 Slamdance Film Festival.

Co-created and co-wrote the western web series Red Bird with his wife Misti Boland. The series starred Armin Shimerman, Mike McShane, Alexandra Goodman and Ian Stark. Osbern also acted as cinematographer and executive producer.

Osbern has worked on a variety of music projects, including videos for Pentatonix, Tim McGraw, David Cook, Lady Gaga, Andy McKee, and The Faint.

== Films as director ==
- Air: The Musical
- Andy McKee: Joyland (film)

== Films as director of photography ==
- Air: The Musical
- Andy McKee: Joyland (film)
- Jayhawkers (film)
- The Only Good Indian
- Spiral Bound
- There Will Be No Stay
- What We've Become
- The Empty Acre
- Last Breath
- The Fat Boy Chronicles
- What Would Jesus Buy?
- Red (2010 film) 'Kansas City Portion'

== Notable music videos ==
- Pentatonix - Dance of the Sugar Plum Fairy - NFL on FOX Version as director / director of photography
- Andy McKee - "Hunter's Moon" as director / director of photography
- Andy McKee - "Everybody Wants to Rule the World" as director / director of photography
- Andy McKee - "Joyland" as director / director of photography
- Andy McKee - "Never Grow Old" as director / director of photography
- The Faint - "Evil Voices" as director of photography
- Shy Boys - "Life is Peachy" as director of photography
- Icky Blossoms - "Perfect Vision" as director of photography
- Icky Blossoms - "Babes" as director of photography
- Shy Boys - "And I Am Nervous" as director of photography
- Syn City Cowboys - "Bad Side" as director / director of photography
- Lacuna Coil - "I Like It" as director of photography
- Okkervil River - "The Industry" as director of photography
- The Faint - "ESP" as producer / director of photography
- Rebecca Pidgeon - "Disintegration Man" as director / director of photography
