= The Sublime and Beautiful =

- Directed by: Blake Robbins
- Written by: Blake Robbins
- Produced by: James B. Cox; Grant Fitch; Marci Liroff; Jon Niccum; Blake Robbins; Warren Ostergard
- Starring: Blake Robbins; Laura Kirk; Matthew Del Negro; Armin Shimerman; Anastasia Baranova
- Cinematography: Lyn Moncrief
- Edited by: Jennifer Vecchiarello
- Music by: Lili Haydn
- Production companies: Through a Glass Productions; Vitamin A Films
- Distributed by: Candy Factory Films
- Release dates: 17 January 2014 (Slamdance Film Festival); 15 December 2014 (US)
- Running time: 93 minutes
- Country: United States
- Language: English

The Sublime and Beautiful is a 2014 American drama film directed by Blake Robbins, starring Blake Robbins, Laura Kirk, Matthew Del Negro, Armin Shimerman and Anastasia Baranova.

== Cast ==
- Blake Robbins as David Conrad
- Laura Kirk as Kelly Conrad
- Matthew Del Negro as Mike Embree
- Armin Shimerman as Lee Weston
- Anastasia Baranova as Katie
- Molly Robbins as Elizabeth Conrad
- Emily Robbins as Samantha Conrad
- Copper Robbins as Jack Conrad

== Release ==
The film premiered at Slamdance Film Festival on 17 January 2014.

== Reception ==
Mark Bell of Film Threat called the film "thoughtful and intriguing" and wrote that it "deserves much attention." John Ford of SLUG Magazine called the film "sublime and beautiful". Kenneth R. Morefield of Christianity Today wrote that the film "address psychological and spiritual themes with sensitivity and shows compassion towards those who struggle through one of life's most intensely painful losses."

Justin Lowe of The Hollywood Reporter called Robbin's skills as a director "serviceable rather than distinctive" and "further limited by the film’s obvious budgetary constraints." Ronnie Scheib of Variety wrote that while Robbins’ acting "sounds no false notes", the "unbroken monotony of the proceedings, while arguably realistic, makes for heavy sledding cinematically."
