= Red Bird (web series) =

- Genre: Drama, Western, Action
- Created by: Misti Boland; Jeremy Osbern
- Written by: Misti Boland; Jeremy Osbern
- Directed by: Misti Boland
- Starring: Alexandra Goodman; Ian Stark; Armin Shimerman; Mike McShane; John Prosky; Kitty Swink
- Composer: Nathan Towns
- Country of origin: United States
- Original language: English
- No. of seasons: 1
- No. of episodes: 8

Production
- Executive producers: Alexandra Goodman; Ian Stark; Misti Boland; Jeremy Osbern
- Producer: Chris Blunk
- Cinematography: Jeremy Osbern
- Editor: Stephen Deaver
- Running time: 3–5 minutes
- Production company: Through a Glass Productions

Original release
- Release: March 24 – April 7, 2016

Red Bird is an American Western web series. It was created by Misti Boland and Jeremy Osbern, which stars the following artists—Alexandra Goodman, Ian Stark, Armin Shimerman, Kitty Swink, Mike McShane, and John Prosky. An eight episode series (with three to five minute airtime per episode) premiered on YouTube and the show's website in March 2016.

Tubefilter, in their Indie Spotlight, described the series as "a female revenge tale featuring Kitty Mae, who is seeking to get even with the gunman who killed her only son in cold blood."

The Daily Dot issued a positive review of the series, noting that from "costumes to locations to an original soundtrack that has presence and bite, it looks and sounds just as you’d imagine the creators—husband and wife Jeremy Osbern and Misti Boland—desired it." But the reviewer also longed for more time in each episode. They stated that episodes "are centered around single set pieces or scenes that although well-scripted and shot, are short, mostly coming in at around three minutes only."

Red Bird was shot on location and sets in Colorado and Kansas City. They incorporated real horses, authentic old west set pieces, and practical gunshot and blood effects for the show.

== History ==
The story is loosely based on the Lawrence massacre of 1863, when William Quantrill and his guerillas killed up to 200 men and boys in Lawrence, Kansas due to a border conflict. Osbern and Boland cited living in Lawrence and reflecting on the history of Bleeding Kansas as an inspiration for creating the series.

== Cast ==
- Alexandra Goodman as Kitty Mae
- Ian Stark as Thomas
- Armin Shimerman as Max
- Kitty Swink as Mary
- Michael McShane as Sam
- John Prosky as Bloody Bill

== Episodes ==
No.	Title	Directed by	Written by	Original release date
1	"On the Precipice"	Misti Boland	Misti Boland& Jeremy Osbern	March 24, 2016
Kitty Mae tracks the J Gang into the mountains of Colorado in search of Jacob.
2	"Betrayed"	Misti Boland	Misti Boland& Jeremy Osbern	March 24, 2016
Kitty Mae tracks down a map to Bloody Bill... while a dark figure tracks down Kitty Mae.
3	"Bounty"	Misti Boland	Misti Boland& Jeremy Osbern	March 31, 2016
Kitty Mae is taken captive... and must come face to face with her past.
4	"Samuel F*****g Green"	Misti Boland	Misti Boland& Jeremy Osbern	March 31, 2016
Things get unfriendly when a mysterious loudmouth tries to track down Kitty Mae.
5	"Bill, Bloody"	Misti Boland	Misti Boland& Jeremy Osbern	March 31, 2016
Kitty Mae and Sam learn the true price of vengeance when they take the fight to Bloody Bill and his Bushwhackers.
6	"Red Bird"	Misti Boland	Misti Boland& Jeremy Osbern	April 7, 2016
Kitty Mae and Sam struggle with the fallout of Kitty's bloody quest.
7	"Sons and Daughters"	Misti Boland	Misti Boland& Jeremy Osbern	April 7, 2016
Thomas meets a mysterious girl and Kitty's revenge bears bitter fruit.
8	"Revenge"	Misti Boland	Misti Boland& Jeremy Osbern	April 7, 2016
Kitty Mae and Josie face off in the brutal conclusion of RED BIRD.

== Awards and nominations ==
Year	Award	Category	Nominee(s)	Result	Ref.
2017	44th Daytime Creative Arts Emmy Awards	Outstanding Digital Daytime Drama Series	Executive Producers: Misti Boland, Alexandra Goodman, Jeremy Osbern, Ian Stark; Producer: Chris Blunk; Director: Misti Boland; Writers: Misti Boland, Jeremy Osbern	Nominated	
2017	44th Daytime Creative Arts Emmy Awards	Outstanding Lead Actress in a Digital Daytime Drama Series	Alexandra Goodman as Kitty Mae	Nominated	
2017	44th Daytime Creative Arts Emmy Awards	Outstanding Lead Actor in a Digital Daytime Drama Series	Michael McShane as Sam	Nominated	
2017	44th Daytime Creative Arts Emmy Awards	Outstanding Supporting or Guest Actor in a Digital Daytime Drama Series	Armin Shimerman as Max	Nominated	
