= Kevin Willmott =

American film director and screenwriter (born 1959)

- Born: August 31, 1959 (age 67); Junction City, Kansas, U.S.
- Education: Marymount College (BA); New York University (MFA)
- Occupations: Film director and writer college film professor
- Employer: University of Kansas
- Awards: Academy Award for Best Adapted Screenplay

Kevin Willmott (born August 31, 1959) is an American film director and screenwriter. He is known for work focusing on black issues including writing and directing Ninth Street, C.S.A.: The Confederate States of America, and Bunker Hill.

His The Only Good Indian (2009) was a feature film about Native American children at an Indian boarding school and the forced assimilation that took place. In Jayhawkers (2014), he followed the life of Wilt Chamberlain, Phog Allen and the 1956 Kansas Jayhawks basketball team. Willmott has collaborated with Spike Lee, with whom he shared an Academy Award for Best Adapted Screenplay for BlacKkKlansman.

== Biography ==
Willmott grew up in Junction City, Kansas, and received a BA in Drama from Marymount College. He received a M.F.A. in Dramatic Writing from New York University. He has worked as a screenwriter and film director, known for work related to African-American history and contemporary issues. In 2017, Willmott taught classes in a bulletproof vest in protest of the ability of students and staff to carry concealed weapons on the campus.

He won the Best Director award at the American Indian Film Festival for The Only Good Indian. Willmott's next film, Jayhawkers, received funding through Kickstarter, a crowdsourcing website.

In 2019, Willmott won an Oscar for Best Adapted Screenplay for the film BlacKkKlansman. He and Spike Lee again collaborated in writing Da 5 Bloods, released worldwide digitally on June 12, 2020.

Wilmott is a professor of film at the University of Kansas.

== Personal life ==
Willmott is Catholic, and has cited Jesuit priest Daniel Berrigan as an influence in his life and work.

== Filmography ==
=== Crew ===
==== Film ====
Year	Title	Crew position
1999	Ninth Street	Director, writer, producer
2004	C.S.A.: The Confederate States of America	Director and writer
2008	Bunker Hill	Director, writer, and producer
2008	The Only Good Indian	Director and producer
2013	Destination: Planet Negro	Director and writer
2013	Jayhawkers	Director, writer, and producer
2015	Chi-Raq	Writer
2018	BlacKkKlansman	Writer
2020	Da 5 Bloods	Writer
2020	The 24th	Director and co-writer
2020	William Allen White: What's the Matter with Kansas?	Director and writer

==== Television ====
Year	Title	Crew position
2000	The '70s	Writer
2005	High Tech Lincoln	Producer

=== Acting ===
Year	Title	Role
1999	Ninth Street	Huddie
2003	The Fascist of X-Mart	Narrator
2003	The Search for Inflata-boy	Expert
2003	Das Bus	The Buppy
2004	C.S.A.: The Confederate States of America	Extra
2009	Next Caller	God (voice)
2010	AIR: The Musical	The Detective
2013	Destination Planet Negro	Dr. Warrington Avery
2013	Unit 12	Bill Swaan
2014	Jayhawkers	Dowdall Davis
2015	Lena Laine	Ryan
2016	From Ashes to Immortality	Dr. Frank Ryan
2017	The Profit	Doctor
2019	The Computer Lab	The Futurist (1 episode)
2021	Rainbow Boulevard	The Narrator (voice)
2021	The Funny Guy	Kevin Weston
