= Kip Niven =

American actor and theater director (1945–2019)

- Born: Clifford Wallace Niven; May 27, 1945; Kansas City, Missouri, U.S.
- Died: May 6, 2019 (aged 73); Kansas City, Missouri, U.S.
- Education: Baylor University; University of Kansas (BA)
- Occupations: Actor; theater director
- Spouses: Susan Tisdall (m. 1968; died 1981) Linda Lavin (m. 1982; div. 1992) Beth Reiff (m. 1994; died 2012)
- Partner: Claudia Copping
- Children: 3

Clifford Wallace "Kip" Niven (May 27, 1945 – May 6, 2019) was an American actor and theater director.

== Early life ==
Niven was born in Kansas City, Missouri, and grew up in Prairie Village, Kansas, the son of William Watson Niven and Elizabeth Hopkins Niven. He graduated from Shawnee Mission East High School and briefly attended Baylor University, before graduating from University of Kansas. After college, he joined the Army, serving three years, including a tour in Vietnam.

== Career ==
In 1972, Niven was featured in the premiere episode of The Sixth Sense. In 1973, he joined David Soul, Robert Urich and Tim Matheson as one of the four rogue cops in Magnum Force, starring Clint Eastwood. He amassed nearly 100 credits in film and television, enjoying recurring roles on TV series such as The Waltons, Alice and Emergency!.

In his later years, Niven returned to the Kansas City area, where he was described as "a pillar of the local theatre scene".

== Personal life ==
Niven's first wife, Susan Tisdall Niven, whom he married in 1968 and with whom he had two children, died in a car accident in 1981. In 1982, he married actress Linda Lavin. They divorced in 1992. In 1994, Niven married Beth Reiff, with whom he had a daughter. They remained together until her death in 2012.

Niven lived in the Kansas City suburb of Leawood, Kansas. He died of a heart attack in Kansas City, Missouri, on May 6, 2019, aged 73.

== Filmography ==
Year	Title	Role	Notes
1972-1973	Emergency!	Clive Jonas in "Nurse's Wild" and Stan Taylor in "Peace Pipe" (1972) Bo Jensen in "The Promise" and Billy Hanks in "School Days" (1973)	
1973	Maneater	Shep Saunders	ABC Movie of the Week
1973	Magnum Force	Officer Alan "Red" Astrachan	
1974	Adam-12	Rookie	
1974	Newman's Law	Assistant Coroner	
1974	Airport 1975	Lt. Thatcher	
1974	Earthquake	Walter Russell	
1975	The Hindenburg	Lieutenant Truscott	
1976	Midway	Lt. Howard P. Ady, PBY Pilot	
1976	Swashbuckler	Willard Culverwell	
1976	Once an Eagle	Ryetower	
1976	The Bionic Woman	Donald Harris - Episode: "Welcome Home, Jaime: Part 2"	
1977	Damnation Alley	Perry	
1978	A Fire in the Sky	Mac	
1978	The Million Dollar Dixie Deliverance	Lt. Ames	
1979	Shadow of Fear	Jim	
1979	Blind Ambition	Egil Krogh	
1979-1981	The Waltons	Lt. Clarke Oler "The Pin-Up" (1979) Reverend Tom Marshall - Recurring 3 Episodes (1981)	
1980	New Year's Evil	Richard Sullivan	
1980	Barnaby Jones	Ted Singleton	episode" Murder in the Key of C"
1981-1985	Alice	Steve Marsh - (Recurring 4 Episodes) Travis Marsh - 2 Episodes (1985)	
1982	Hart to Hart	Ford Beebe	Season 4 Episode "Harts On Campus"
1993	Dead Before Dawn	Ken Fuller	
2001	The Painting	Doctor	
2002	More than Puppy Love	Vincent	
2006	Raising Jeffrey Dahmer	Attorney Howard Parker	
2009	The Only Good Indian	Dr. Hummber	
2014	Jayhawkers	Forrest 'Phog' Allen	
2017	The Tree	Wade Garrison	
2017	Goodland	Hal Bloom	
2019	The Land	Farmer Jim	(final film role)
