= Laura Kirk =

American actress

- Born: Laura Ellen Kirk; 1966 (age 58–59); Lecompton, Kansas
- Occupation(s): Actress, professor
- Years active: 1999–present

Laura Ellen Kirk (born 1966 in Lecompton, Kansas) is an American actress and university professor. She is most known for her role in Lisa Picard Is Famous (2000).

== Career ==
A graduate of the University of Kansas in Lawrence, Kansas, Kirk made her film debut in At First Sight, opposite Val Kilmer and Mira Sorvino. In 2000, Kirk co-wrote and starred in the comedy film Lisa Picard Is Famous. The film had its world premiere at the Cannes Film Festival. The film was released in a limited release on August 22, 2001.

She played Shelia Denning in the 2004 made-for-TV movie, A Boyfriend for Christmas, as well as a guest on the television series House and Third Watch.

Kirk earned the award for Best Actress at the Newport Beach Film Festival and a nomination for Best Actress at the Milano International Film Festival for her portrayal of Kelly Conrad in the 2014 drama The Sublime and Beautiful.

She appeared in the 2016 road film American Honey as an affluent Kansas City housewife named Laura who is visited at her home by the lead characters played by Shia LaBeouf and Sasha Lane.

Since 2010, Kirk has served on the faculty of the University of Kansas in the Film and Media Department.

== Filmography ==
- At First Sight (1999) as Betsy Ernst
- Lisa Picard is Famous (2000) as Lisa Picard
- The Time Machine (2002) as Flower Seller
- Murder Without Conviction (2004) as Alberta Talley
- A Boyfriend for Christmas (2004) as Shelia Denning
- Bunker Hill (2008) as Hallie
- The Only Good Indian (2009) as Miss Harris
- The Sublime and Beautiful (2014) as Kelly Conrad
- American Honey (2016) as Laura
