= Kevin Geer =

American actor

- Born: Kevin Scully Geer; November 7, 1952; Reno, Nevada, U.S.
- Died: January 25, 2017 (aged 64); Manhattan, New York, U.S.
- Occupation: Actor
- Years active: 1975–2017

Kevin Scully Geer (November 7, 1952 – January 25, 2017) was an American actor of stage and screen.

== Early life ==
Geer was born in Reno, Nevada, and raised in Los Angeles, California. Kevin Geer's father died when he was an infant. He moved from Reno, Nevada, to Los Angeles with his mother, Claire Scully Geer.

== Career ==
After graduating from a military academy in southern California, he moved to New York to become an actor, beginning his career in 1975, his best noted stage performances included A Streetcar Named Desire (1988), The Rose Tattoo (1995), Flyovers, Side Man (both 1998) and Twelve Angry Men (2004).

He appeared in the films A Force of One (1979), The Pelican Brief (1993), The Contender (2000), American Gangster (2007), Bunker Hill (2008), The Men Who Stare at Goats (2009), and Shelter (2014).

Some of his television appearances included The Waltons, M*A*S*H, The Equalizer, MacGyver, China Beach, Oz, Homicide: Life on the Street, and several of the Law & Order franchise shows.

== Awards ==
He received the 2017 Obie Award for Outstanding Performance in memoriam of his sustained excellence in the theatre and dedication to his craft.

== Death ==
Geer died from a heart attack on January 25, 2017, at his Manhattan home. He was 64.

== Filmography ==
=== Film ===
Year	Title	Role	Notes
1979	A Force of One	Johnson	
1989	Simple Justice	Det. Ed Warren	
1993	The Pelican Brief	K. O. Lewis	
1999	Side Man	Jonesy	Direct-to-video
1999	The Tavern	Dave	
1999	4 a.m.: Open All Night	Doc	Short film
2000	The Contender	Congressman Skakle	
2002	Garmento	Jack Kearns	
2007	American Gangster	Law School Professor	
2007	Trainwreck: My Life as an Idiot	Older Banker	
2008	100 Feet	Priest	
2008	Bunker Hill	McLain	
2009	The Only Good Indian	Peairs	
2009	The Men Who Stare at Goats	CIA Agent	
2011	Margaret	AIG Detecive #2	
2014	Shelter	Walter	

=== Television ===
Year	Title	Role	Notes
1978	M*A*S*H	Sgt. Jerry Nielsen	Episode: "Billfold Syndrome"
1979	The Waltons	Sgt. Charles W. "Chuck" Turner	Episode: "The Tailspin"
1979	Friendly Fire		Television film, uncredited
1979	Steeletown	Joe Falcone	Television film
1979	Operation Petticoat	MP	Episode: "Big Deal on Kaloa Street"
1980	Roughnecks	Tom McBride	Television film
1980	Rage!	Del	Television film
1980	Marilyn: The Untold Story	Jim Dougherty	Television film
1981	A Few Days in Weasel Creek	Calvin	Television film
1986, 1988	The Equalizer	Orchid Killer / Willie J. Hawkins	2 episodes
1989	MacGyver	Dr. Fred Beam	Episode: "The Invisible Killer"
1989	China Beach	Brian McMurphy Jr.	2 episodes
1989	Sweet Bird of Youth	Tom Junior	Television film
1990	Monsters	Joe	Episode: "The Bargain"
1993	New Year	Barry	Television film
1996, 2010	Law & Order	Brian Egan / Mr. Evans	2 episodes
1996	Homicide: Life on the Street	Brian Egan	Episode: "For God and Country"
1997, 2001	All My Children	Fire Chief / Officer Baird	2 episodes
1998	New York Undercover	Maloney	Episode: "Capital Punishment"
1999	Oz	Axelrod	Episode: "Unnatural Disasters"
2001, 2010–2011, 2016	Law & Order: Special Victims Unit	Phil Kastner / Belton Merrell / Mr. Walsh / Chief Gabriel	4 episodes
2004–2005	Law & Order: Criminal Intent	Detective / Jules Livanski	2 episodes
2013	Alpha House	Normal Chase	Episode: "Ruby Shoals"
2014	Elementary	Raymond Carpenter	Episode: "The Adventure of the Nutmeg Concoction"
