= The Scent of Rain and Lightning =

- Film poster
- Directed by: Blake Robbins
- Written by: Jeff Robison; Casey Twenter
- Based on: The Scent of Rain and Lightning by Nancy Pickard
- Produced by: Michael Davis; Maggie Grace; Jeff Johnson; Blake Robbins; Jeff Robison; Casey Twenter; Kevin Waller; Dan Koetting
- Starring: Maika Monroe; Mark Webber; Will Patton; Bonnie Bedelia; Justin Chatwin; Brad Carter; Logan Miller; Maggie Grace
- Cinematography: Lyn Moncrief
- Edited by: Lauren Clark Carroll
- Music by: Will Blair; Brooke Blair
- Production companies: No Coast Entertainment; Gerson Productions; KP Remain
- Distributed by: SP Releasing
- Release date: March 25, 2017 (Atlanta)
- Country: United States
- Language: English
- Budget: $3 million

The Scent of Rain and Lightning is a 2017 American drama film directed by Blake Robbins and written by Jeff Robison and Casey Twenter, based on the novel of the same name by Nancy Pickard. The film stars an ensemble cast that includes Maika Monroe, Maggie Grace, Justin Chatwin, Mark Webber, Logan Miller, Will Patton, and Brad Carter.

The film had its world premiere at the Atlanta Film Festival on March 25, 2017, and had a limited release on February 16, 2018. It received positive reviews from critics.

== Plot ==
When a young woman learns her parents' killer has been released from jail, she is forced to revisit old wounds while discovering the destructive power of hate and the true cost of family secrets fully revealing themselves.

== Cast ==
- Maika Monroe as Jody Linder
- Meg Crosbie as Young Jody Linder
- Maggie Grace as Laurie
- Justin Chatwin as Hugh Jay Linder
- Mark Webber as Chase
- Logan Miller as Collin Croyle
- Will Patton as Senior
- Brad Carter as Billy
- Aaron Poole as Meryl
- Bonnie Bedelia as Annabelle
- Blake Robbins as Sheriff Don Phelps
- Ken Wood as Deputy Sheriff Mason Walker

== Production ==
On July 23, 2015, it was announced that Nancy Pickard's novel The Scent of Rain and Lightning was being adapted into a film, which Blake Robbins would direct, Maggie Grace, Maika Monroe and Brad Carter leading the cast. Casey Twenter, Jeff Robison, and Jeff Johnson would produce the film through No Coast Entertainment, along with Kevin Waller through Gerson Productions and Michael Davis and Grace. On November 5, 2015, it was announced Justin Chatwin, Mark Webber, Logan Miller, Aaron Poole, Will Patton and Bonnie Bedelia had joined the cast.

=== Filming ===
Principal photography on the film began on October 27, 2015, in Oklahoma, and concluded on November 21, 2015, with a total of 21 days of shooting.

== Release ==
The film had its world premiere at the Atlanta Film Festival on March 25, 2017. Shortly after, SP Releasing acquired distribution rights to the film and set it for a February 16, 2018, release.

== Reception ==
On review aggregator website Rotten Tomatoes, the film holds an approval rating of 100%, based on 8 reviews, and an average rating of 7.6/10. On Metacritic, the film has a weighted average score of 76 out of 100, indicating "generally positive reviews".
