= Matthew Del Negro =

American actor (born 1972)

- Born: August 2, 1972 (age 54); Mount Kisco, New York, U.S.
- Occupation: Actor
- Years active: 1997–present
- Spouse(s): Deirdre Whelan Del Negro (m. 2002–present)
- Children: 2

Matthew Del Negro (born August 2, 1972) is an American actor.

== Life and career ==
Matthew Del Negro was born in Mount Kisco, New York, as the youngest of three children. He graduated from John Jay High School in Cross River, New York in 1990. He is a graduate of Boston College, where he played Division I lacrosse.

After graduating, Del Negro began to study acting, and after appearing in several minor commercials and independent films, he was cast as Brian Cammarata on The Sopranos. This led to appearances in other television series, such as The West Wing, Law & Order, Scandal, Stargate: Atlantis, Las Vegas, Beautiful People, CSI: Crime Scene Investigation, NCIS, Joan of Arcadia, Happy Endings, Rizzoli & Isles, Unforgettable, Lie to Me, Teen Wolf, United States of Tara, and Goliath.

His film appearances include Chelsea Walls, Ira & Abby, Trailer Park of Terror, Saving Lincoln and Hot Pursuit. He has also been cast in several theater productions. He provided the voice of Ops Com in the 2011 video game SOCOM 4: U.S. Navy SEALs. Further video game work includes L.A. Noire and Mass Effect 3.

In 2019, Del Negro began a recurring role on the Showtime crime drama series City on a Hill; he was promoted to a series regular for the series' second season.

He currently teaches acting classes in Santa Monica. His second cousin is former NBA player Vinny Del Negro.

== Filmography ==
=== Film ===
Year	Title	Role	Notes
1997	The North End	Freddie Fabucci	
2000	The Gypsy Years	Christian Murphy	
2000	The Doghouse	Mickey Summer	
2001	Chelsea Walls	Rookie Cop	
2006	Ira & Abby	Seth	
2006	Room 314	Nick	
2007	Ghost Image	Tucker	
2008	Trailer Park of Terror	Pastor Lewis	Direct-to-video
2008	B.O.H.I.C.A.	Busche	
2011	A Novel Romance	Buddy Andrews	
2012	Celeste and Jesse Forever	Nick	
2012	Buoy	Danny	
2013	Automotive	Paul	
2013	Saving Lincoln	Nathaniel Rulough	
2014	Alex of Venice	James	Also creative consultant
2014	The Sublime and Beautiful	Mike Embree	
2015	Hot Pursuit	Detective Hauser	
2017	Wind River	Dillon	
2017	Sleepwalker	Other Scott	
2017	Limerence	Tom	Also executive producer
2023	LaRoy, Texas	Junior	
2026	Crime 101	Police Captain Stewart	

=== Television ===
Year	Title	Role	Notes
2000	The $treet	Dean	Episode: "Pilot"
2001	Law & Order	Driver	Episode: "Judge Dread"
2002–2007	The Sopranos	Brian Cammarata	Recurring role; 8 episodes
2003	Whoopi	Daryl	Episode: "Sticky Fingers"
2004	Joan of Arcadia	Emergency Room Doctor	Episode: "No Bad Guy"
2004	NCIS	Balboa	Episode: "Bête Noire"
2004	Law & Order	Vinny	Episode: "Payback"
2004	Cooking Lessons	Forest	Television film
2004	Tempting Adam	Brad	Television film
2005–2006	The West Wing	Bram Howard	Recurring role; 16 episodes
2006	Las Vegas	Garrison Wheeler	Episode: "Urban Legends"
2006	Beautiful People	Ben Lewis	Recurring role; 8 episodes
2007	Stargate Atlantis	Mike Branton	Episode: "Sunday"
2007	Law & Order	Peter Fetzer	Episode: "Over Here"
2007	CSI: Miami	Mike Farallon	Guest role; 2 episodes
2009	Lie to Me	Agent Young	Episode: "Sacrifice"
2009	Medium	Michael Skahan	Episode: "Truth Be Told"
2009	Trauma	Davey	Guest role; 2 episodes
2009–2010	United States of Tara	Nick Hurley	Recurring role; 9 episodes
2010	Parenthood	Timm	Guest role; 2 episodes
2010	Eastwick	Danny Torcoletti	Episode: "Pampered and Tampered"
2010	The Whole Truth	Dan Olin	Episode: "Judicial Discretion"
2011	Chase	Psychiatraat Alan	Episode: "Seven Years"
2011–2013	Rizzoli & Isles	Giovanni Gilberti	Recurring role; 4 episodes
2012	Blue Eyed Butcher	Jeff's Co-worker	Television film
2012	Ringer	Grady Torrance	Guest role; 3 episodes
2012	The Client List	Josh Harper	Episode: "Try, Try Again"
2012	The Good Wife	Officer Curtis Robb	Episode: "I Fought the Law"
2012	Damages	Chris's Soldier Source	Episode: "But You Don't Do That Anymore"
2012	Happy Endings	Kent	Episode: "Cazsh Dummy Spillionaires"
2012–2013	Chasing the Hill	Henry Walls	Recurring role; 4 episodes
2013	Criminal Minds	Detective Rizzo	Episode: "Carbon Copy"
2013	CSI: Crime Scene Investigation	Alan Quinn	Episode: "Fearless"
2013	Witches of East End	Archibald Browning	Episode: "Potentia Noctis"
2013–2016	Mistresses	Jacob Pollock	Recurring role; 16 episodes
2013–2017	Teen Wolf	Rafael McCall	Recurring role (Seasons 3–4), Guest role (Season 6); 19 episodes
2014	The Neighbors	Rob	Episode: "High School Reunion"
2014–2016	NCIS: Los Angeles	Jack Simon	Recurring role; 4 episodes
2014–2017	Scandal	Michael Ambruso	Recurring role; 16 episodes
2015	Chicago Fire	Chief Pat Pridgen	Guest role; 2 episodes
2015	Madam Secretary	Mike Wilkerson	Episode: "The Doability Doctrine"
2015	Unforgettable	Hunter Ellis	Season 4, Episode 5: "All In"
2015	Goliath	Danny Loomis	7 episodes
2016	Elementary	Nathan Resor	Episode: "Folie a Deux"
2017	When We Rise	Gavin Newsom	Television mini-series
2017	Dimension 404	Time Ryder	Episode: "Chronos"
2017	9JKL	Richie	Episode: "Cool Friend Luke"
2019	Huge in France	Jason Alan Ross	Main cast; 8 episodes
2019–2022	City on a Hill	Detective Caysen	Series regular (season 2), recurring previously
2020	Magnum P.I.	Todd Stewart	Episode: "Mondays Are for Murder"
2022	The Watcher	Darren Dunn	Episode: "Someone to Watch Over Me"
2024	Mayor of Kingstown	Will Breen	Recurring role
2025	Long Bright River	Simon Cleare	Recurring role
2026	Neagley	Pierce Woodrow	Main cast; 7 episodes

=== Video games ===
Year	Title	Role	Notes
2011	SOCOM 4: U.S. Navy SEALs	Ops Com	Voice role
2011	L.A. Noire	Henry Arnett	Voice role
2012	Mass Effect 3	Lieutenant Steve Cortez	Voice role
