= Trailer Park of Terror =

2008 film directed by Steven Goldmann

- Directed by: Steven Goldmann
- Written by: Timothy Dolan
- Based on: Trailer Park of Terror by Imperium Comics
- Produced by: Jonathan Bogner
- Starring: Nichole Hiltz; Matthew Del Negro; Jeanette Brox; Trace Adkins; Trisha Rae Stahl; Michelle Lee; Priscilla Barnes; Myk Watford
- Cinematography: Jeff Venditti
- Edited by: Jarred Buck
- Music by: Alan Brewer
- Distributed by: Summit Entertainment
- Release date: October 19, 2008
- Running time: 98 minutes
- Country: United States
- Language: English
- Budget: $2 million

Trailer Park of Terror is a 2008 American horror film directed by Steven Goldmann and written by Timothy Dolan. It stars Nichole Hiltz, Matthew Del Negro, Trace Adkins, Myk Watford and Jeanette Brox.

== Plot ==
Based on the Imperium Comics series of the same name, Trailer Park of Terror follows six troubled high school students and their leader, the optimistic youth ministries pastor, Lewis (Matthew Del Negro). As the group return from an outdoor character building retreat in the mountains they become lost on the back roads after their bus crashes during a raging storm. The luckless group seeks refuge for the night in a seemingly abandoned trailer park down the road, managed by the strange and seductive Norma (Nichole Hiltz). As the night progresses they find that the park is anything but empty as Norma and her undead trailer trash buddies pick them off in imaginative ways.

== Cast ==
- Nichole Hiltz as Norma
- Matthew Del Negro as Pastor Lewis
- Jeanette Brox as Bridget
- Trace Adkins as The Man
- Trisha Rae Stahl as Larlene
- Michelle Lee as Miss China
- Priscilla Barnes as Jean
- Myk Watford as Roach
- Stefanie Black as Tiffany
- Ricky Mabe as Michael
- Hayley Marie Norman as Amber
- Cody McMains as Jason
- J. P. Manoux as Cigrit
- Lew Temple as Marv
- Ryan Carnes as Alex
- Tracey Walter as Ancient Trucker
- Nick Sita as Colonel Buttmunch

== Release ==
Trailer Park of Terror first premiered at the Slamdance Film Festival in January 2008, and then later at the Toronto After Dark Film Festival on October 19, 2008. The film was subsequently released on DVD on October 21, 2008.

== Reception ==
Dai Green of Horrornews.net described the film as "a grotesque, bloody, hilarious, testament to what happens when a director knows there is more out there than horror-p*rn flicks," and likened the character of Norma to "a cross between Reese Witherspoon in ‘Freeway’ and Sherrie Moon Zombie in ‘House Of 1000 Corpses’." He gave the film a rating of "four horns". Joe Leydon of Variety thought the film was well cast and that some of the young actors were impressive in their efforts to flesh out their thin roles.

== See also ==
- House of 1000 Corpses
- The Devil's Rejects
- Wrong Turn
