= The Home (2025 American film) =

2025 film by James DeMonaco

- Theatrical release poster
- Directed by: James DeMonaco
- Written by: James DeMonaco; Adam Cantor
- Produced by: Bill Block; Sébastien K. Lemercier
- Starring: Pete Davidson; John Glover; Bruce Altman
- Cinematography: Anastas N. Michos
- Edited by: Todd E. Miller
- Music by: Nathan Whitehead
- Production companies: Miramax; BlockFilm; Man in a Tree Productions
- Distributed by: Lionsgate; Roadside Attractions
- Release date: July 25, 2025
- Running time: 95 minutes
- Country: United States
- Language: English
- Box office: $1.9 million

The Home is a 2025 American psychological horror film directed by James DeMonaco, written by DeMonaco and Adam Cantor, and starring Pete Davidson, John Glover, and Bruce Altman. The film follows graffiti artist Max (Davidson), who works at a retirement home as part of his court-ordered community service and begins noticing strange occurrences relating to the home's elderly residents.

The Home was theatrically released by Lionsgate and Roadside Attractions on July 25, 2025, and received generally negative reviews from critics.

== Plot ==
Max, a foster child whose older foster brother Luke died by suicide a decade prior, has grown into a graffiti artist who has been arrested for vandalism. His foster father works out a deal so he can work community service and not receive a criminal record. He moves into a retirement home headed by Dr. Sabian, where Max is to act as superintendent. Fellow staff members Juno and Les tell him not to enter the fourth floor.

Max befriends some of the residents as he comes to discover multiple strange incidents such as residents breaking into his room at night, spontaneous resident bleeding, and uncomfortable psychological disorders. He also has nightmares. After hearing screaming from the fourth floor, Max breaks in and finds the residents there are mostly lethargic and suffer from extreme bodily harm and psychoses. After one resident on the fourth floor attacks him, Les pull him off and tells Max not to return.

Max befriends one resident, Norma, who tells him that there is something wrong with the place but leaves before telling him what. The next day, Max is blowing leaves outside when he notices the fourth floor resident painting his blood on the window, but as he watches this Norma falls from the home and is impaled on the fence. Soon after another resident, Lou, exhibits strange behavior and claws at himself, but survives.

Max receives a message from a secret video room on his computer from a faceless woman. He later meets the woman, Gretchen, who tells Max that the home is actually a secret government facility where they experiment on the residents, as any deaths or psychosis will be attributed to old age. The fourth floor resident enters the room and attacks Gretchen; Max is knocked unconscious while trying to stop him.

After waking up, Max returns to his foster parents' home. There, he meets two new younger foster children who show him a private room in the house with ritualistic symbols after his foster mother inadvertently reveals she knew Norma. The room also contains yearly albums, each of which show the home's residents and staff posing alongside a restrained staff member, including one that shows Luke. He returns to the home, recognizing the fourth floor resident as Luke and learning that the other fourth floor residents are also former staff members.

Max is captured by the staff and restrained at a party, including Lou, Gretchen, Max's foster parents, Les, Juno, and Dr. Sabian. They reveal that the events Max has been experiencing, including Gretchen's claims of a government facility, were all fabricated as part of a story in which Max is the protagonist. Sabian explains that they take the fluid from foster children's eyes to give them extended life, with Max's foster parents providing the victims, and that Norma was feeling guilty about exploiting Max so they murdered her.

Max is placed on the fourth floor so his youth can be harvested for the cult. Luke harvests the eye fluid from the remaining fourth floor victims and himself, and he feeds Max all of their fluid which gives him enough stamina to kill the residential home's cult, including Juno, Les, Lou, Dr. Sabian, and Gretchen. Max's foster parents try to escape, but are killed when a storm wind blows a sheet of glass into them outside of their car. After the storm, Max, Luke, and the drained victims, having regained some of their strength by taking back the fluid from the dead cult, escape the home.

== Cast ==
- Pete Davidson as Max
- John Glover as Lou
- Bruce Altman as Dr. Sabian
- Ethan Phillips as Ethan
- Mary Beth Peil as Norma
- Marilee Talkington as Gretchen
- Victor Williams as Couper

== Production ==
In September 2021, James DeMonaco confirmed to Collider to be directing a ‘paranoid psychological horror thriller’ titled The Home, with Pete Davidson in the lead role. Produced by Miramax, principal photography took place in the New Jersey cities of Denville, Elizabeth and Nutley, from late January to early April 2022. The closed senior living facility in Denville, Saint Francis Residential Community, served as the titular "home". By April 2022, Marilee Talkington joined the cast.

== Release ==
In October 2023, Lionsgate acquired U.S. distribution rights to the film at the 2023 Toronto International Film Festival. The film was released on July 25, 2025 in the United States. It opened the FrightFest film festival on August 21, 2025.

== Reception ==
=== Box office ===
In the United States and Canada, The Home opened alongside The Fantastic Four: First Steps and Oh, Hi!, and grossed $1 million in its opening weekend, finishing tenth at the box office for the weekend of July 25–27.

=== Critical response ===
On the review aggregator website Rotten Tomatoes, 29% of 54 critics' reviews are positive. The website's consensus reads: "The Home drowns its intriguing premise in a mire of muddled storytelling, illogical twists, and lifeless performances, resulting in a frustrating and tensionless mess." Metacritic, which uses a weighted average, assigned the film a score of 39 out of 100, based on 11 critics, indicating "generally unfavorable" reviews.
