= An Origin Story =

- Fringe episode
- Episode no.: Season 5 Episode 5
- Directed by: P. J. Pesce
- Written by: J. H. Wyman
- Production code: 3X7505
- Original air date: November 2, 2012

Guest appearances
- John Prosky as captive Observer; Michael Rogers as Interruption Observer; Shaun Smyth as Anil

Episode chronology
← Previous "The Bullet That Saved the World"	Next → "Through the Looking Glass and What Walter Found There"
- Fringe season 5

"An Origin Story" is the fifth episode of the fifth season of the Fox science-fiction/drama television series Fringe, and the 92nd episode overall.

The episode was written by J. H. Wyman and directed by P. J. Pesce.

== Plot ==
Peter (Joshua Jackson) and Olivia (Anna Torv) mourn the loss of their daughter Etta, who was killed by the Observers. Olivia, in particular, is deeply shaken and nearly unresponsive. As they prepare to leave Etta's safe house, Peter discovers a hidden stash of guns and antimatter bombs.

Through Etta's contact in the resistance, Anil (Shaun Smyth), they learn that the Observers have received a delivery of parts for their atmospheric modification machine, which, if completed, will make the planet inhospitable to humans. Walter (John Noble) and Peter recognize from eyewitnesses that the deliveries are being made through wormholes from the Observers' future, and if they can disrupt the delivery process, they will be one step closer to defeating the Observers. Anil informs them that they have captured an Observer (John Prosky), along with a book in the Observer's strange script and a device used to open the wormhole.

While Astrid (Jasika Nicole) works at decoding the book, Peter attempts to understand the device, believed to focus the opening of the wormhole upon delivery. The device proves to be extremely dangerous if put together the wrong way, forcing Peter to go to the captured Observer to try to get information. Olivia tries to stop him, worried about Peter, but Peter insists that he must do this so that Etta's death will not be in vain. At an abandoned warehouse where Anil has kept the Observer, Peter is unable to convince the Observer to talk but instead monitors subtle body actions of the Observer, using those to judge when he is assembling the device correctly. Meanwhile, Walter has found an old video tape of one of Etta's first birthdays, and offers it to Olivia, hoping to coax her out of her depression, but she refuses to watch it.

Astrid successfully decodes the book and identifies a delivery being made that afternoon; Peter too is successful at assembling the device, having finished after seeing the Observer's pupil dilate in making a final connection. Peter, Olivia, and Anil go and start the device, and prepare to fire one of Etta's anti-matter canisters into it, expecting it to disrupt the wormhole and cause the other end to collapse in a singularity. Observers nearby, preparing for the delivery, spot Peter and Olivia and try to stop them, but Olivia snaps out of her depression to waylay the Observer. Peter fires the anti-matter at the wormhole and collapses it. As the three drive away, they are stunned to see another wormhole opened nearby with more shipments passing through. Peter is furious, disbelieving the Observers in the future could recover that fast, and storms off to interrogate the captured Observer. Olivia goes to follow, but is instead awed when she sees a number of human resistance posters plastered in the alley with Etta's face on them and the word "Resist".

Peter confronts the Observer, who notes that Peter only thought he saw what he wanted to see – the Observer's subtle reactions were only in response to observing a fly on the wall. The Observer claims Peter assembled the device all on his own, and he only needed him to act as some type of corroboration. The Observer further mocks a quote said by Anil to Peter: if one goes on a quest for vengeance, one should dig two graves. Furious, Peter strikes the Observer, but when the Observer shows no emotion nor even seems to care if he should die, Peter cuts out a device located on the back of his neck, which Anil earlier claimed is what makes an Observer super-human. The Observer dies from the extraction.

Later, Olivia decides to watch the tape, and is overcome with emotion. She calls Peter to reiterate how much she loves him, just after Peter has inserted the Observer's device into the back of his own neck.

== Production ==
"An Origin Story" was written by executive producer and showrunner J. H. Wyman, while being directed by Tremors veteran P. J. Pesce, his first directing credit for the series.

== Reception ==
=== Ratings ===
"An Origin Story" first aired in the United States on November 2, 2012, on Fox. An estimated 2.7 million viewers watched the episode, and earned a ratings share of 1.0 among adults aged 18 to 49, to rank fourth in its timeslot. The episode increased in overall viewership from the previous episode.

=== Reviews ===
Zack Handlen of The A.V. Club rated "An Origin Story" an "A", citing that it did an excellent job in handling the fallout from Etta's death in "a way that never becomes overly self-indulgent or grim", and that " the mourning we do get is direct, powerful, and, most important of all, relevant not just to the characters’ emotions in the moment, but also to this season's, and this show's, overall themes". IGN's Ramsey Isler gave it a positive review, scoring it 8.6 out of 10. He felt the first half of the episode was lacking, but thought "the last quarter of this episode is a perfect example of how powerful and nearly perfect Fringe can be at its best." He also enjoyed the unique portrayal of Peter and Olivia's grieving over Etta's death.

In a 2013 list, Den of Geek named "An Origin Story" as the tenth best episode of the entire series, explaining that it "stuck in the mind" in part because it "kicks off one of the season’s more interesting mini-arcs." Cory Barker of TV.com named the episode the 14th best of the series, calling it a "stand-out episode", and saying, "the show put in a fine effort to make us realize how important [Etta] was after the fact, by showing the different ways her parents grieved." Jeff Jensen of Entertainment Weekly named "An Origin Story" the eighteenth best episode of the series, stating "Fringe worked one of its best themes — the dehumanization we risk by seeking to become superhuman to assuage pain and achieve justice — to shocking effect when Peter, raging from Dead Etta grief, butchered an Observer to jack his quantum computer/teleportation power plug and become an omniscient yet dangerously distant transhuman himself."
