= Bunker Hill (film) =

2008 film

- Theatrical release poster
- Directed by: Kevin Willmott
- Written by: Greg Hurd; Kevin Willmott
- Produced by: Thomas L. Carmody; Hoite C. Caston
- Starring: James McDaniel; Saeed Jaffrey; Laura Kirk; Kevin Geer
- Cinematography: Matt Jacobson
- Edited by: Sean Blake; Victoria Goetz
- Music by: Kelley Hunt; Nathan Towns
- Release date: October 17, 2008 (Williamstown Film Festival)
- Country: United States
- Language: English

Bunker Hill is a 2008 western drama film written and directed by Kevin Willmott.

== Plot ==
Peter Salem, a former Wall Street executive recently released from prison, returns to his ex-wife and children in the small town of Bunker Hill, Kansas. Soon after he arrives, the town's electricity and power are shut off, and there is no way to communicate with authorities outside of town. The town's militant past is reawakened and forces coalesce to protect citizens from an unseen enemy. The town's fear leads to the creation of a posse of gunmen, resulting in torture, illegal searches and eventually, murder, against which Salem must stand.

== Cast ==
- James McDaniel as Peter Salem
- Saeed Jaffrey as Mr. Farook
- Laura Kirk as Halle
- Kevin Geer as McLain
- Blake Robbins as Delmar
- Scott Allegrucci as Deputy Ross
- Ranjit Arab as Nadim
- RJ Smith as a PA
- Lindsay Smith as extra

== Production ==
Willmott produced and directed this film from a script he wrote with Greg Hurd. It was shot in the town of Nortonville, Kansas.
