= Myk Watford =

American actor

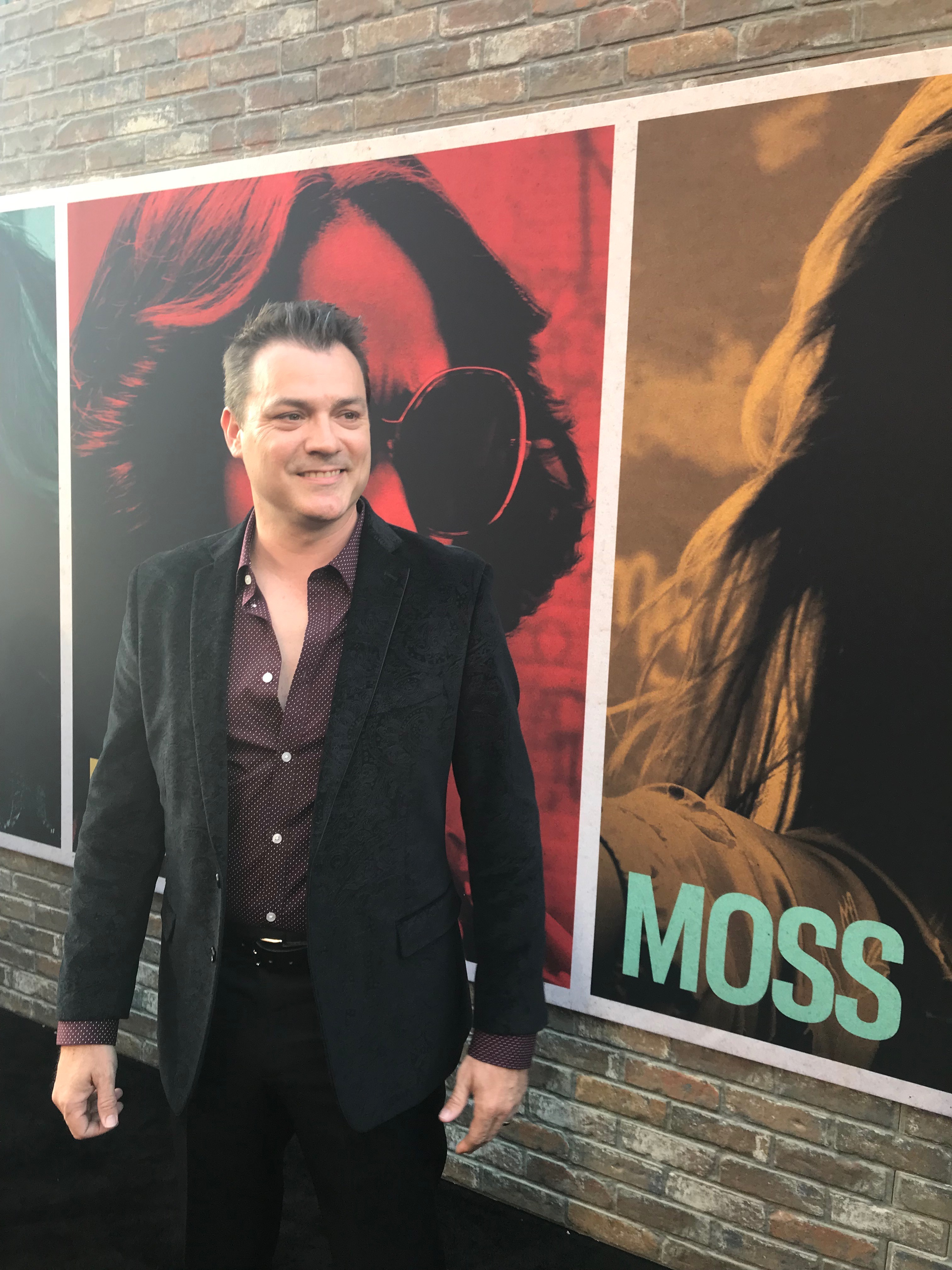
Watford Attends The Kitchen Hollywood Premiere, 2019

Myk Watford is an American actor and musician. He is best known for his roles in the 2008 film Trailer Park of Terror, Spider-Man and the 2019 film The Kitchen.

== Early life and education ==
Watford was born in St. Petersburg, FL and grew up in Russellville, AL which is 30 miles south of Muscle Shoals in North Alabama. He attended the University of Utah, where he was classically trained in theatre. Watford currently resides in Los Angeles, CA.

== Career ==
=== Film and television ===
In 2002, Watford was cast as a cop in Sam Raimi's Spider-Man, starring Tobey Maguire and Kirsten Dunst. He also appeared as Roach in Trailer Park of Terror (2008), No Country for Old Men (2007) and as Richard Matt in Lifetime's New York Prison Break The Seduction of Joyce Mitchell(2017) with Penelope Ann Miller. Watford's television credits include CSI, Law And Order: SVU, Criminal Minds, Without a Trace, NCIS, The Mentalist, Breaking Bad, Bones, Scandal, Longmire, Lethal Weapon, and Bosch. He can currently be seen as Detective Morelli in season 3 of HBO’s True Detective and as Eichler in the Netflix series The OA.

In 2019, Watford appeared as Little Jackie in Andrea Berloff’s directorial debut, The Kitchen.

=== Theatre ===
Watford has also appeared in the Broadway and Off-Broadway productions Take Me Out, Hank Williams: Lost Highway, The Good Negro and Five by Tenn.

Watford portrayed Horace Vandergelder in OFC Creations' regional production of Hello, Dolly! in January and February 2026.

=== Music ===
Watford is also the front man of the popular swamp-rockabilly band, Stumpwaller, as well as the Johnny Cash Tribute Band, Big Cash and the Folsom 3.

== Filmography ==
Film
Year	Title	Role	Notes
2002	Spider-Man	Cop at Fire	
2003	Screen Door Jesus	Sheriff Lou Dawson	
2003	Marci X	Police Officer	
2005	The Exonerated	Hayes Cop No. 2	TV movie
2006	The Hoax	Sergent Daniels	
2007	No Country for Old Men	'Managerial Victim'	
2008	Trailer Park of Terror	Roach	
2008	Beer for My Horses	Norvel	
2009	Flying By	Willy	
2011	A Hidden Agender	Carl Smart	Short
2012	Arcadia	Officer Allen	
2014	1000 to 1: The Cory Weissman Story	Marc Weissman	Video
2014	Earth to Echo	Blake Douglas	
2016	War Torn	Franklin	Short
2017	New York Prison Break The Seduction of Joyce Mitchell	Richard Matt	TV movie
2017	The Trial of the Rockstar	Ricky Trixx	Short
2017	Darkness Rising	Daniel	
2019	The Kitchen	Little Jackie	
2021	Respect	Rick Hall	

Television
Year	Title	Role	Episode
1999–2014	Law & Order: Special Victims Unit	Captain Sam Reynolds / Mark Whitlock / Tommy / Paul Cormick / Terry Davies	8 episodes
2000	Third Watch	Ed	Episode: "Nature or Nurture"
2003	Hack	Bert	Episode: "Collateral Damage"
2004	The Sopranos	Cop No. 1	Episode: "Where's Johnny?"
2005	Law & Order: Criminal Intent	Tim Holtzman	Episode: "Sex Club"
2005	Rescue Me	Steve	Episode: "Harmony"
2006	Law & Order	Detective Hannigan	Episode: "Deadlock"
2007	The Unit	Sergeant Wallace	Episode: "Dark of the Moon"
2007	CSI: Miami	Jerry Simmons	Episode: "Rush"
2007	NCIS	Major Eric Sweigart	Episode: "Ex-File"
2008	Criminal Minds	Curtis Fackler	Episode: "A Higher Power"
2008	Numb3rs	Alex Rezar	Episode: "High Exposure"
2008	True Blood	Bunkie Police Officer	Episode: "To Love Is To Bury"
2009	Without a Trace	John Gilroy	Episode: "Believe Me"
2009	The Closer	Todd West	Episode: "Elysian Fields"
2010	Cold Case	Joe Dan Billingsley	Episode: "Flashover"
2010	Justified	Price	Episode: "Riverbrook"
2010	Medium	Daniel Kerrigan	Episode: "Time Keeps on Slipping"
2011	Private Practice	Billy Douglas	2 episodes
2011	The Mentalist	Cole Larkin	Episode: "Fugue in Red"
2012	Person of Interest	Scott Powell	Episode: "Root Cause"
2012	CSI: Crime Scene Investigation	David Jorgensen	Episode: "Altered Stakes"
2012	Breaking Bad	Engineer	Episode: "Dead Freight"
2012	NCIS: Los Angeles	Mike Hoffman	Episode: "The Fifth Man"
2012	Emily Owens, M.D.	Mr. Reeser	Episode: "Emily and...the Question of Faith"
2013	CSI: NY	Reno Martell	Episode: "White Gold"
2013–2014	The Young and the Restless	Womack	13 episodes
2014	Bones	Ethan Papadelis	Episode: "The Cold in the Case"
2014	Longmire	Norwood Young	Episode: "Of Children and Travelers"
2016	Bosch	Captain Larry Gandle	Episode: "Trunk Music"
2016	The Night Shift	Steven Benedict	Episode: "Three-Two-One"
2017	Training Day	Vince Parker	Episode: "Quid Pro Quo"
2017	Scandal	Luther	Episode: "Day 101"
2019	True Detective	Detective Morelli	2 episodes
2019	The OA	Eichler	2 episodes
2021	The Rookie	FBI Agent	Episode: "Bad Blood"
2023–2026	For All Mankind	Palmer James	16 episodes
