= John Prosky =

American actor

John Prosky (born 1962) is an American film, theatre, and television actor.

== Career ==
Prosky's numerous TV credits include NYPD Blue, ER, Heroes, Criminal Minds, True Blood, JAG, My So-Called Life, Star Trek: Deep Space Nine, The Practice, The X-Files, The West Wing, Charmed, 24, House, Grey's Anatomy, Veronica Mars, Just Shoot Me!, Fringe, and the web series Red Bird. His film credits include The Nutty Professor, Bowfinger, and A.I. Artificial Intelligence. Prosky also contributed voice work to the L.A. Noire video game.

== Personal life ==
Prosky is the son of actor Robert Prosky. He has been married to actress Kimiko Gelman since 2000.

== Filmography ==
=== Film ===
Year	Title	Role	Notes
1991	Late for Dinner	Officer Tom Bostich	
1992	Interceptor	Collins	
1994	Final Mission	Sergeant Wyatt	
1995	Aurora: Operation Intercept	Capt. Hulett	
1996	The Phantom	Cycle Cop	
1996	The Nutty Professor	Doctor	
1997	Fire Down Below	Aide #1	
1998	Goodbye Lover	Forensic Cop	
1998	Permanent Midnight	Cop	
1998	Brown's Requiem	Larkin	
1999	Bowfinger	MindHead Executive	
2000	Lost Souls	Orderly	
2001	A.I. Artificial Intelligence	Mr. Williamson, the Bellman	
2002	Cock & Bull Story	Tom O'Malley	
2002	Groom Lake	Hester Dealt	
2003	Gods and Generals	Lewis Armistead	
2003	Bringing Down the House	Male Commentator	
2003	Hulk	Atheon Technician	
2003	The Battle of Shaker Heights	Director	
2004	Hidalgo	Officer at Horse Corral	
2004	The Last Shot	Hotel Manager	
2005	Heart of the Beholder	Reverend Brewer	
2006	Mini's First Time	Husband #2	
2007	The Dukes	Brad	
2009	Just Peck	Dr. Lipschitz	
2010	Radio Free Albemuth	Dr. Goldfarb	
2012	The Devil Inside	Father Christopher Aimes	
2012	K-11	Simon Schwartz	
2014	The Park Bench	Professor McIntyre	
2015	Straight Outta Compton	Doctor A. Friedman	
2016	Ouija: Origin of Evil	Doctor Fuller	
2017	Please Stand By	Hospital Administrator	
2019	The Way You Look Tonight	Dad / Richard	

=== Television ===
Year	Title	Role	Notes
1986	A Case of Deadly Force	Phil Cochran	Television film
1990	L.A. Law	Officer Randall Carlson	Episode: "Watts a Matter?"
1990	In the Line of Duty: A Cop for the Killing	Don	Television film
1991	Flight of Black Angel	Controller	Television film
1991	Dream On	Albert Tarver	Episode: "Play Melville for Me"
1991	Life Goes On	Mike Evans	Episode: "Sweet 16"
1993	Bob	Sommelier	Episode: "Michiana Moon"
1994	Something Wilder	The Cop	Episode: "Buster Beefy"
1994	Le bâton: The Stick	Bertram	Television film
1994, 2001	NYPD Blue	Various roles	2 episodes
1995	My So-Called Life	Ted	Episode: "Resolutions"
1995	Sketch Artist II: Hands That See	Sherman Bochs	Television film
1996	Forgotten Sins	Polygraph Technician	Television film
1996	Murder One	Mark Smith, Esq.	Episode: "Chapter Seventeen"
1996	Star Trek: Deep Space Nine	Brathaw	Episode: "For the Cause"
1996	Frasier	Preston	Episode: "A Lilith Thanksgiving"
1996	The Cold Equations	Markham	Television film
1996–1997	Chicago Hope	Bart Simon	4 episodes
1997	The Burning Zone	Dr. Vanderkelen	Episode: "On Wings of Angels"
1997	Tenchi Muyo!	Additional voices	26 episodes
1997	Brooklyn South	Mr. Bloomford	Episode: "Why Can't Even a Couple of Us Get Along?"
1997	The Jamie Foxx Show	Lottery Official	Episode: "Mo' Money, Mo' Problems"
1997	Michael Hayes	Carl Bellamy	Episode: "Slaves"
1997–2004	JAG	Various roles	4 episodes
1998	Beverly Hills, 90210	Duke Weatherill	2 episodes
1998	Beyond Belief: Fact or Fiction	Earl Potter	2 episodes
1998	The Advanced Guard	Alpha the Alien Commander	Television film
1998	The Closer	Malloy	Episode: "My Best Friend's Funeral"
1998	Pensacola: Wings of Gold	Jules Clegg	Episode: "Boom"
1998	Spy Game	Hale	Episode: "Well, Nothing to Fear But Death Itself"
1999	Profiler	Sallinger	Episode: "All in the Family"
1999	Just Shoot Me!	Norman	Episode: "The Odd Couple: Part 1"
1999	Moesha	Professor Ward	Episode: "Just Above My Head"
1999	My Little Assassin	Harold Bly	Television film
1999	Port Charles	Darren Leopold #2	5 episodes
2000	Titus	Dr. Meighan	Episode: "Episode Eleven"
2000	Trial by Media	Tom Reynolds	Television film
2000	Strip Mall	Rafe & Harve's Doctor	2 episodes
2000	The Practice	EPA Atty. Mitchell Kravits	3 episodes
2000	The West Wing	Aide #4	Episode: "Shibboleth"
2001	Star Trek: Voyager	Otrin	Episode: "Friendship One"
2001	Stargate SG-1	Malchus	Episode: "Red Sky"
2001	Touched by an Angel	Greg Hatcher	Episode: "Famous Last Words"
2001	Charmed	Congressman	Episode: "Muse to My Ears"
2001, 2005	Judging Amy	Mr. Guidry	2 episodes
2002	24	Dr. George Ferragamo	Episode: "11:00 a.m.-12:00 p.m."
2002	Felicity	Dr. Stern	Episode: "Ben Don't Leave"
2002	The X-Files	Medical Examiner	Episode: "Jump the Shark"
2002	Becker	Mr. Connelly	Episode: "Blind Injustice"
2003	Lost at Home	Mr. Garth	Episode: "One Bracelet Don't Feed the Beast"
2003	Peacemakers	Tipton	Episode: "The Perfect Crime"
2004	Oliver Beene	David	Episode: "Soup to Nuts"
2004	The D.A.	Wil Banner	Episode: "The People vs. Achmed Abbas"
2004	ER	Mr. Brooks	4 episodes
2004	House	Dr. Bergin	Episode: "The Socratic Method"
2005	Second Time Around	Mr. Seabrooks	Episode: "You're Fired"
2005	American Dreams	Councilman Marv Acker	3 episodes
2005	Jane Doe: Til Death Do Us Part	Charles Greene	Television film
2005	Gone But Not Forgotten	Wayne Turner	Television film
2005	The Closer	Mr. Banks	2 episodes
2005	Nip/Tuck	Glen Easley	Episode: "Frankenlaura"
2005–2006	Related	Dr. Gorenberg	3 episodes
2006	Grey's Anatomy	Mr. Singleton	Episode: "Begin the Begin"
2006	Walkout	Principal Dyer	Television film
2006	CSI: NY	Museum Administrator	Episode: "Necrophilia Americana"
2006	Veronica Mars	Ethan Lavoie	2 episodes
2006	Heroes	Principal	2 episodes
2007	Crossing Jordan	Keene's Lawyer	Episode: "Sleeping Beauty"
2007	Sharpshooter	Hostage Walker	Television film
2007	Love's Unfolding Dream	George	Television film
2007–2008	Medium	Tom Van Dyke	10 episodes
2007–2008	The Young and the Restless	Chaplain Owen Anderson / Dr. Hill	6 episodes
2008	Boston Legal	Attorney Walt Devlin	Episode: "Rescue Me"
2008	Cold Case	Dr. Thomas Rabinski	Episode: "Ghost of My Child"
2008	General Hospital	Todd Shepard	2 episodes
2008	Brothers & Sisters	Ron Robinson	Episode: "Tug of War"
2008	Eli Stone	Alan Cooke	2 episodes
2008	My Own Worst Enemy	Lance Dietrich	Episode: "That Is Not My Son"
2008	My Name Is Earl	Mr. Stevens	Episode: "Earl and Joy's Anniversary"
2008–2012	True Blood	David Finch	6 episodes
2009	Eleventh Hour	Chase Coleman	Episode: "Electro"
2009	CSI: Crime Scene Investigation	ADA Vanderpool	Episode: "If I Had a Hammer..."
2009	Numbers	Kyle Holtzman	Episode: "Con Job"
2009, 2010	FlashForward	Mr. Dunkirk	2 episodes
2010	The Gates	Lloyd Foster	Episode: "Digging the Dirt"
2010	Law & Order: LA	Dr. Gouldin	Episode: "Echo Park"
2011	The Mentalist	Dr. Evan Quick	Episode: "Bloodstream"
2011	The Event	Gerard	3 episodes
2011	Prime Suspect	AA Sponsor	Episode: "The Great Wall of Silence"
2012	Luck	Chairman	Episode: "Ace Meets with a Talented Whiz Kid"
2012	NCIS	Carl Dalton	Episode: "The Tell"
2012	Last Resort	Pilgrim	Episode: "Blue on Blue"
2012	Private Practice	Jerry Murphy	Episode: "Good Grief"
2012	Fringe	Captive Observer	Episode: "An Origin Story"
2012, 2015	Major Crimes	Mr. Banks	2 episodes
2013	Body of Proof	Clark Wilson	Episode: "Skin and Bones"
2013	Touch	Lawrence Pearl	3 episodes
2014	Revenge	Brenda Evans / Oscar Chapman	Episode: "Allegiance"
2014	Tyrant	Pilot	Episode: "Pilot"
2014	Criminal Minds	Jim Carlson	Episode: "The Itch"
2015	Agent Carter	Walt Cooper	Episode: "Valediction"
2015	Murder in the First	Dr. Wersheim	Episode: "My Sugar Walls"
2015	Scandal	Senator Gibson	4 episodes
2016	Red Bird	Bloody Bill	Episode: "Bill, Bloody"
2016	American Horror Story: Roanoke	Production Legal Team	Episode: "Chapter 6"
2017	The Fosters	Dr. Danville	2 episodes
2017	Law & Order True Crime	Weisberg's Colleague	Episode: "The Menendez Murders: Episode 7"
2017	Chance	Rich Daveny	2 episodes
2018	Conrad	Tom Tristan	Episode: "Hangin' with Conrad"
