= Shelter (2014 film) =

2014 film

- Theatrical release poster
- Directed by: Paul Bettany
- Written by: Paul Bettany
- Produced by: Robert Ogden Barnum; Paul Bettany; Katie Mustard; Daniel Wagner
- Starring: Jennifer Connelly; Anthony Mackie
- Cinematography: Paula Huidobro
- Edited by: John F. Lyons
- Music by: James Lavelle
- Production companies: Bifrost Pictures; The Bridge Finance Company
- Distributed by: Screen Media Films
- Release dates: September 12, 2014 (TIFF); November 13, 2015 (United States)
- Running time: 105 minutes
- Country: United States
- Language: English

Shelter is a 2014 American drama film written and directed by Paul Bettany in his directorial debut. The film stars Jennifer Connelly and Anthony Mackie, alongside a supporting cast featuring Rob Morgan, Amy Hargreaves, and Bruce Altman. It was released on November 13, 2015, by Screen Media Films.

== Plot ==
Tahir, an illegal immigrant from Nigeria, and Hannah, a heroin addict, live homeless on the streets of Manhattan. Tahir, a devout Muslim who is polite to everyone he meets, survives by performing music in city parks, while Hannah lies, steals and sells her body to get her next fix. When Tahir saves Hannah from a suicide attempt, the two form a friendship. Over the year that follows, they share their pasts, and their friendship turns to love. Their circumstances begin to improve, but Tahir falls ill and eventually "joins" his wife and child who died in Nigeria. His love for Hannah helps her overcome her addiction and return to her son in California.

== Cast ==
- Jennifer Connelly as Hannah
- Anthony Mackie as Tahir
- Rob Morgan as Franklin
- Amy Hargreaves as Carrie
- Bruce Altman as Peter
- Kevin Geer as Walter
- Alok Tewari as Abdul
- Scott Johnsen as Terry
- Babs Olusanmokun as Hospital Security Guard

== Production ==
On August 21, 2013, it was announced Paul Bettany would direct the film.

== Release ==
The film premiered at the Toronto International Film Festival on September 12, 2014. On January 14, 2015, Screen Media Films acquired distribution rights to the film and released it on November 13, 2015.

== Reception ==
Shelter has received generally mixed reviews from critics. On Rotten Tomatoes, the film has a rating of 48%, based on 23 reviews, with an average score of 5.6/10. On Metacritic, the film has a score of 43 out of 100, based on 11 critics, indicating "mixed or average reviews".
