= Bruce Altman =

American actor (born 1955)

- Born: July 3, 1955 (age 71); New York City, New York, U.S.
- Education: University at Albany; Yale University MFA
- Years active: 1986–present
- Spouse: Darcy McGraw (m. 1982)
- Children: 1

Bruce Altman (born July 3, 1955) is an American film and television actor. He is a graduate of the Yale School of Drama.

== Personal life ==
Altman was born in The Bronx, New York. He is of Jewish background. He is married to Darcy M. McGraw, a lawyer and former director of the Connecticut Innocence Project. They had one child: daughter, Anna, who died November 11, 2013 in New Haven, Connecticut, at age 24.

== Filmography ==
=== Film ===
Year	Title	Role
1991	Regarding Henry	Bruce
1992	My New Gun	Irwin Bloom
1992	Glengarry Glen Ross	Larry Spannel
1993	Rookie of the Year	Jack Bradfield
1993	Mr. Wonderful	Mr. Wonderful
1993	Mr. Jones	David
1994	Quiz Show	Gene
1994	The Paper	Carl
1996	Rescuing Desire	Dr. Ralph Mallory
1996	To Gillian on Her 37th Birthday	Paul Wheeler
1996	Vibrations	Barry
1997	Cop Land	Counselor Burt Kandel
1998	The Object of My Affection	Dr. Goldstein
1999	Rituals and Resolutions	Larry
1999	Girl, Interrupted	Prof. Gilcrest
2001	L.I.E.	Marty Blitzer
2001	Get Well Soon	Barry
2002	Changing Lanes	Terry Kauf
2003	Marci X	Stan Dawes
2003	Matchstick Men	Dr. Harris Klein
2005	Twelve and Holding	Coach Gilmore
2006	Running Scared	Dez
2007	National Lampoon's Bag Boy	Norman
2008	Deception	Lawyer #1
2008	Puppy Love	Gary
2009	Peter and Vandy	Dad
2009	Bride Wars	Simmons
2009	The Skeptic	Dr. Warren Koven
2009	Solitary Man	Dr. Steinberg
2009	It's Complicated	Ted
2010	Morning Glory	NBC Executive
2012	Game Change	Fred Davis III
2012	Arbitrage	Chris Vogler
2013	Kilimanjaro	Milton
2013	Delivery Man	Mass Action Attorney
2014	Rob the Mob	Gotti Prosecutor
2014	Shelter	Peter
2015	Touched with Fire	Donald
2016	Miracles from Heaven	Dr Burgi
2017	Fifty Shades Darker	Jerry Roach
2018	Fifty Shades Freed	Jerry Roach
2019	The Sound of Silence	Harold Carlyle
2020	Chemical Hearts	Toby
2020	Irresistible	Richard Peeler
2022	Master	Brian
2022	Last Seen Alive	Barry Adams
2025	The Home	Doc Sabian

=== Television ===
Year	Title	Role	Notes
1986	The Equalizer	Michaels	Episode: "A Community of Civilized Men"
1991–2024	Law & Order	Brad Feldman / Harv Beigal / Alvin Lawrence / Tom Morrison / Mayor Robert Payne	10 episodes
1995	Touched by an Angel	Henry	2 episodes "Interview with an Angel" "The Driver"
1997–1998	Nothing Sacred	Sidney Walters	20 episodes
2001	Law & Order: Special Victims Unit	Mark Sanford	Episode: "Stolen"
2002	Law & Order: Criminal Intent	Jack Crowley	Episode: "Tuxedo Hill"
2002	The Sopranos	Alan Sapinsly	Episode: "Whitecaps"
2004	Rescue Me	Dr. Shinsky	Episode: "Butterfly"
2008	Recount	Mitchell Berger	HBO Original Movie
2010	Modern Family	Mr. Jennings	Episode: "Truth Be Told"
2010	Royal Pains	Jamie Zimmerman	Episode: "Frenemies"
2010–2013	Blue Bloods	Mayor Frank Russo/Former Mayor Robert Levitt	10 episodes
2011	Damages	Jim Girotto	3 episodes
2011	Suits	Anthony Mazlo	1 episode (season 1 episode 8)
2011	Friday Night Lights	Head of Braemore	Episode: "The March"
2013	Person of Interest	Dr. Ronald Carmichael	2 episodes "Liberty" "Lady Killer"
2014	Elementary	Dr. Jonathan Fleming	Episode: "The Many Mouths of Aaron Colville"
2014	Alpha House	Marty Corman	Episode: "The Nuptials"
2015	Madam Secretary	Alec Lehane	1 episode
2015–2017	Mr. Robot	Terry Colby	6 episodes
2015	Show Me a Hero	Buddy Dorman	TV miniseries (6 episodes)
2015	American Dad!	James Patterson (voice)	Episode: "Manhattan Magical Murder Mystery Tour"
2016	The Blacklist	Jerry Fox	Episode: “Dr. Adrian Shaw"
2016	Madoff	Gary Flumenbaum	TV miniseries
2016	Odd Mom Out	Ernie Krevitt	3 episodes
2017	Ozark	Gary Silverberg	1 episode
2017	Chicago P.D.	Donald Clark	1 episode
2018	Orange Is the New Black	Les Nichols	Episode: "Look Out for Number One"
2020–2024	Power Book II: Ghost	Oliver Simmons	10 episodes
2022	Uncoupled	Henry	1 episode
2023	The Marvelous Mrs. Maisel	David Weston	Episode: "The Pirate Queen"
