= Flyovers (play) =

Flyovers is a stage play by Jeffrey Sweet that premiered at the Victory Gardens Theater in Chicago and later ran at the 78th Street Theatre Lab in New York City. The play tells the story of Oliver, a film critic who returns to his hometown in Ohio for his high school reunion and confronts Ted, a bully who has lost his job at the local plant.

The Chicago Tribune praised the play as "engaging" and a "deserved success."

== Productions ==
=== New York Theatre ===
Directed by Sandy Shinner. Lighting in 78th Street Theatre Lab, 236 West 78th Street; 212-868-4444. Thursday through Saturday at 8 pm, Sunday and Monday at 7 pm; Sunday, February 15 at 2 pm and 7 pm January 29—February 15.

- Lianne .... Donna Bullock
- Ted .... Kevin Geer
- Oliver .... Richard Kind
- Iris .... Michele Pawk
