= Marci Liroff =

American film producer

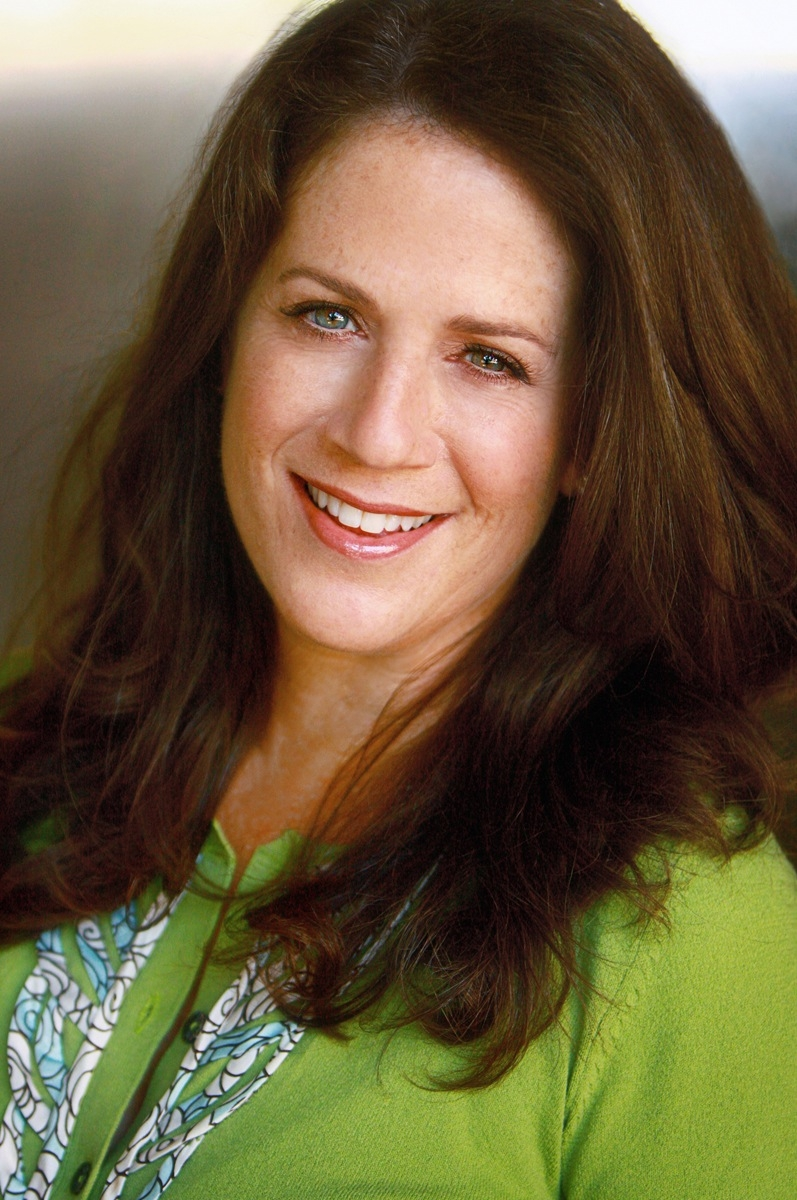
- Marci Liroff
- Born: Marci Liroff; February 3, 1958 (age 68); Los Angeles
- Occupations: Casting director, Intimacy coordinator, Acting coach

Marci Liroff (born February 3, 1958) is a casting director, intimacy coordinator and acting coach based in Los Angeles, California, known for her work in film and television.

== Early career ==
After attending the University of Denver, Liroff began her career in 1977 as an assistant to the VP of International Distribution for Dimension Pictures, where she learned about the marketing, sales and distribution of films—especially blaxploitation films (Black Shampoo, Dolemite, Dr. Black and Mr. Hyde, Dixie Dynamite – and assisted in selling the rights to such pictures all over the world.

A year later, Liroff became the assistant to a television agent at International Creative Management (ICM) in Los Angeles. While there, Liroff placed ICM clients on such shows as Happy Days, Mork and Mindy, WKRP in Cincinnati, Soap, Barney Miller, All in the Family, and Maude.

In 1979, Liroff started working with casting directors Mike Fenton and Jane Feinberg of Fenton-Feinberg Casting.

Liroff started as Fenton's assistant and worked on movies such as Raiders of the Lost Ark, and History of the World, Part I. She earned credit as a casting director on E.T. the Extra-Terrestrial, Porky's, Poltergeist, Blade Runner, A Christmas Story, and Indiana Jones and the Temple of Doom.

A chance meeting between producer Craig Zadan and Steven Spielberg resulted in Spielberg's recommendation of Liroff to cast Zadan's upcoming Footloose.

Liroff would go on to cast such films as St. Elmo's Fire, Pretty in Pink, The Cutting Edge, Mannequin, Jack Frost, The Iron Giant, Insomnia, Freaky Friday, Gothika, Mean Girls, The Spiderwick Chronicles, "Ghosts of Girlfriends Past" and Mr. Popper's Penguins. She associate-produced and cast Untamed Heart and The Crush, and co-produced and cast The Spitfire Grill, which won the "Audience Award" at The Sundance Film Festival in 1996.

Liroff was a state witness in the New York rape trial of Harvey Weinstein in 2020. As the casting director of the 2014 Weinstein-produced film Vampire Academy, she testified about Weinstein staging a sham audition with Jessica Mann, one of the star witnesses in the case.

== Coaching ==
In 2009, Liroff started private coaching of actors and created an Audition Boot Camp, in which she teaches the fundamentals of auditioning.

Liroff is also a writer for Backstage Magazine.

== Guild affiliations ==
- "The Academy of Motion Picture Arts and Sciences"
- "The Academy of Television Arts and Sciences"
- "Teamsters 399"
- "Casting Society of America" National Board Member

== Filmography (casting) ==
=== Films ===
- "Magic Camp" (2017)
- "Myrna" (2015)
- "The Sublime and Beautiful" (2014)
- "Vampire Academy" (2014)
- "Mr. Popper's Penguins" (2010)
- Ghosts of Girlfriends Past (2009)
- The Spiderwick Chronicles (2008)
- Full of It (2007)
- Just Like Heaven (2005)
- Land of the Dead (2005)
- New York Minute (2004)
- Mean Girls (2004)
- View from the Top (2003)
- Gothika (2003)
- Freaky Friday (2003)
- Insomnia (2002)
- Hardball (2001)
- Summer Catch (2001)
- Cats & Dogs (2001)
- Ready to Rumble (2000)
- The Iron Giant (1999)
- Jack Frost (1998)
- The Spitfire Grill (1996)
- The Tie That Binds (1995)
- It Runs in the Family (1994)
- The Crush (1993)
- Untamed Heart (1993)
- FernGully: The Last Rainforest (1992)
- The Cutting Edge (1992)
- Eve of Destruction (1991)
- Sibling Rivalry (1990)
- Men at Work (1990)
- Coupe de Ville (1990)
- Cousins (1989)
- The Experts (1989)
- Hearts of Fire (1987)
- You Ruined My Life (1987)
- Siesta (1987)
- Mannequin (1987)
- Pretty in Pink (1986)
- Legend (1985)
- St. Elmo's Fire (1985)
- Return to Oz (1985)
- Mischief (1985)
- Johnny Dangerously (1984)
- The Ratings Game (1984)
- Indiana Jones and the Temple of Doom (1984)
- Footloose (1984)
- A Christmas Story (1983)
- Running Brave (1983)
- All the Right Moves (1983)
- Twilight Zone: The Movie (1983)
- Porky's II: The Next Day (1983)
- Best Friends (1982)
- Kiss Me Goodbye (1982)
- Porky's (1982)
- Endangered Species (1982)
- Six Weeks (1982)
- Blade Runner (1982)
- Poltergeist (1982)
- E.T. the Extra-Terrestrial (1982)

=== Television ===
- The Paul Reiser Show (TV pilot) (2010)
- Atlanta (TV pilot) (2007)
- The Strip (1999)
- Dellaventura (TV pilot) (1997)

== Filmography (producer) ==
=== Films ===
- The Spitfire Grill (1996) (co-producer)
- The Crush (1993) (associate producer)
- Untamed Heart (1993) (associate producer)
