= A Boyfriend for Christmas =

2004 American TV movie

- Written by: Roger Schroeder
- Directed by: Kevin Connor
- Starring: Kelli Williams; Patrick Muldoon; Charles Durning; Bruce Thomas; Shannon Wilcox
- Music by: Charles Sydnor
- Country of origin: United States
- Original language: English

Production
- Executive producers: Robert Halmi Jr. Larry Levinson
- Producers: Kyle Clark; James Willberger
- Cinematography: Amit Bhattacharya
- Editor: Thomas A. Krueger
- Running time: 90 minutes
- Production companies: Alpine Medien Productions; Larry Levinson Productions

Original release
- Network: Hallmark Channel
- Release: November 27, 2004

A Boyfriend for Christmas is a 2004 American made-for-television romantic Christmas film starring Patrick Muldoon and Kelli Williams. Directed by Kevin Connor and written by Roger Schroeder, it aired November 27, 2004 on the Hallmark Channel.

== Plot ==
After helping a boy take his little sister to see Santa, 13-year-old Holly Grant tells a shopping mall Santa Claus that she would like to have a boyfriend for Christmas. Twenty years later, Holly is a romantic skeptic and is more focused on her career as a social worker. At the time, she is in court helping a mother get her children back from foster care. When the mother's lawyer, Ryan Hughes, does not show up in court, Holly is extremely angry and sends Hughes a letter via her secretary. On Christmas Day, she opens her door to a man carrying a Christmas tree and a bow on his chest. He hands her a note that says, "As promised, one boyfriend for Christmas," and introduces himself as "Douglas Firwood". She assumes he is a gag present from her friend Diane, and invites him into her home. Later that day she takes him with her to her parents' house for Christmas dinner. Hoping to keep her matchmaking family, especially her manipulative sister-in-law Carol, off her back, she tells everyone that Douglas is her long-term boyfriend, and Douglas plays along. On New Year's Eve, Holly learns from her scheming ex-boyfriend Ted that Douglas is really Ryan Hughes, who was sent to her by Santa Claus. She accuses him of lying to her and tells him to leave. After persuasion by Santa Claus and refusing Ted's marriage proposal, she follows Ryan. They meet up at a park, where they finally remember where they first met - at age 13 when she helped him take his little sister to see Santa - and they watch the New Year's fireworks together.

== Cast ==
- Kelli Williams as Holly Grant
- Patrick Muldoon as Ryan Hughes/Douglas Firwood
- Charles Durning as Santa Claus
- Bruce Thomas as Ted
- Shannon Wilcox as Joanna Grant
- Martin Mull as Martin Grant
- Bridget White as Carol Grant
- David Starzyk as Ian Grant
- Jordan Orr as Noah Grant
- Shane Baumel as Neal Grant
- Erica Gimpel as Beth
- Maeve Quinlan as Diane
- John Dybdahl as Stu
- Kenneth Danziger as Harrison Lane
- Rodger Bumpass as Russell Parker
- Laura Kirk as Sheila Denning
- Kelli King as young Holly Grant
- Brent Toney as Philip

== Release ==
=== Television ===
A Boyfriend for Christmas was a made-for-TV production, which aired on the Hallmark Channel November 27, 2004. It earned a 2.7 Nielsen Media Research household rating, placing it as the number two broadcast for its time period for ad-supported cable networks, and the number one broadcast for adults aged 25–54 and women aged 25–54.

== Critical reviews ==
A review in TV Guide says of the film "like fruitcake, [it] is sweet but full of empty calories."

In The New York Times, A Boyfriend for Christmas is identified as bland, yet pleasant and harmless."

=== DVD ===
The DVD was released on November 8, 2005.

== See also ==
- List of Christmas films
