= The Big One (TV series) =

- Starring: Sandi Toksvig; Mike McShane
- No. of series: 1
- No. of episodes: 7

Production
- Running time: 30 minutes
- Production company: Hat Trick Productions

Original release
- Network: Channel 4
- Release: 5 March – 16 April 1992

The Big One is a 1992 British comedy-drama television series starring Sandi Toksvig as Deddie Tobert and Mike McShane as James Howard.

Seven episodes were broadcast on Channel 4 from 5 March to 16 April 1992. The series was written by Elly Brewer and Toksvig, and directed by John Henderson. Guest actors included Mel Martin, Jim Sweeney and Dexter Fletcher. The title theme was "I Close My Eyes and Count to Ten" by Dusty Springfield.

The show is referenced negatively in Bottom Live by Ade Edmondson.
