= Lisa Picard Is Famous =

- Promotional poster
- Directed by: Griffin Dunne
- Written by: Nat DeWolf; Laura Kirk
- Produced by: Dolly Hall; Mira Sorvino
- Starring: Laura Kirk
- Cinematography: William Rexer
- Edited by: Nancy Baker
- Music by: Evan Lurie
- Release date: May 2000
- Running time: 90 minutes
- Country: United States
- Language: English

Lisa Picard Is Famous, also known as Famous, is a 2000 comedy-drama film directed by Griffin Dunne and written by Nat DeWolf and Laura Kirk. The film stars Kirk, DeWolf, Dunne, Daniel London, and a large number of actors in cameos as themselves.

The film's story is about a documentarian who has focused on Lisa Picard as she is on the verge of stardom. It was screened in the Un Certain Regard section at the 2000 Cannes Film Festival.

== Cast ==
- Laura Kirk as Lisa Picard
- Nat DeWolf as Tate Kelly
- Griffin Dunne as Andrew
- Daniel London as Boyfriend
- Cameos as themselves:
  - Sandra Bullock
  - Carrie Fisher
  - Melissa Gilbert
  - Buck Henry
  - Spike Lee
  - Penelope Ann Miller
  - Charlie Sheen
  - Fisher Stevens
  - Mira Sorvino
