= Touched by an Angel season 2 =

Touched by an Angel
- Season 2
- Starring: Roma Downey; Della Reese; John Dye
- No. of episodes: 24

Release
- Original network: CBS
- Original release: September 23, 1995 – May 18, 1996

Season chronology
- ← Previous; Season 1 Next → Season 3

The second season of the American dramatic television series Touched by an Angel ran on CBS from September 23, 1995 to May 18, 1996, spanning 24 episodes. Created by John Masius and produced by Martha Williamson, the series chronicled the cases of two angels, Monica (Roma Downey) and her supervisor Tess (Della Reese), who bring messages from God to various people to help them as they reach a crossroads in their lives. A third angel, Andrew (John Dye) is introduced as the "Angel of Death".

A season set containing all of the episodes of the season was released to Region 1 DVD. The episodes use the song "Walk with You", performed by Reese, as their opening theme.

== Episodes ==
No. overall	No. in season	Title	Directed by	Written by	Original release date	Prod. code	Viewers (millions)
12	1	"Interview with an Angel"	Helaine Head	Teleplay by : Martha Williamson; Story by : Marilyn Osborn & Martha Williamson	September 23, 1995	202	12.7
A newspaper editor advertises for angels so she can boost the newspaper sales and Monica recalls some of her assignments. As unhappy as Tess is, she offers her a chance to explain to a newspaper editor about angelic encounters. Guest stars: Bruce Altman, Dinah Manoff, Gerald McRaney and Marcia Strassman
13	2	"Trust"	Victor Lobl	Jule Selbo	September 30, 1995	204	15.7
As a rookie cop, Monica works with a seasoned police officer, who returns to the squad after recovering from a gunshot wound, while Tess works as a police dispatcher to help Monica and Zack find some arrests. Zack, now partnering with Monica, learns why he has been escaping from Ben. Having been addicted to painkillers, his drugs addictions become quite apparent, when he steals a stash from a drug dealer that Zack and Monica apprehend. Finding his behavior to be totally erratic, Tess transmits to Zack and Monica they were a no show at the hearing, after Mason's arrest, leading Zack and Monica to disciplinary action. Monica helps Zack overcome his substance abuse problems. Guest stars: Joe Penny, John Hawkes and Paul Rodriguez
14	3	"Sympathy for the Devil"	Tim Van Patten	R.J. Colleary	October 7, 1995	201	16.0
Monica attends the rodeo with Tess and encounters Kathleen, whom Monica remembers as an angelic friend from the past. However, Tess informs Monica that Kathleen has fallen and is no longer her friend. The fallen angel attempts to break up a grandfather/father-son relationship, but Monica must intervene with the truth that Kathleen is now a demonic influence. Guest stars: Jasmine Guy and Stacy Keach
15	4	"The Driver"	Tim Van Patten	Glenn Berenbeim	October 14, 1995	203	15.9
When a reporter is asked to cover the hit and run of a baseball star, her guilt overcomes her after she realizes she was the one who hit the baseball star and contemplates suicide because of this. When all else fails, Tess sends Monica to help the high-powered reporter to clear up her faults. Guest stars: John Spencer, Vanessa Bell Calloway and Diahann Carroll
16	5	"Angels on the Air"	Bruce Bilson	R.J. Colleary	October 21, 1995	113	14.3
A teen girl's mother is an obnoxious radio DJ who offers her listeners a chance to take her daughter to the prom. This causes a rift between them that the angels must fix. Guest stars: Melissa Joan Hart, James Marsden, Jack Black and Elizabeth Ashley
17	6	"In the Name of God"	Tim Van Patten	Martha Williamson	October 28, 1995	112	14.4
A white supremacist group led by one of Tess's former cases try to stop an AIDS hospice opening. Tess's anger gets the better of her and her job has to be taken over by Sam until she learns to fight with love not anger, while Monica uncovers the truth behind a politician. Guest stars: Talia Balsam, John Schneider, Dick Van Patten and Paul Winfield
18	7	"Reunion"	Victor Lobl	Valerie Woods	November 4, 1995	206	17.4
A poet's worst fears are realized when her son's childhood love returns and it's discovered she has AIDS. She must learn to let go and let the childhood sweethearts live their lives, with the encouragement of Tess. Guest stars: Natalie Cole and Maya Angelou
19	8	"Operation Smile"	Nancy Malone	Glenn Berenbeim & R.J. Colleary & Martha Williamson	November 11, 1995	205	19.0
Monica becomes a babysitter to Emily, a little girl who has a cleft lip. Her mother Ginger works as an exotic dancer for money and refuses to let her daughter be seen by anyone, as she feels Emily's disfigurement is her fault, which angers Monica. Problems start when Emily makes a friend invited who learns that a free surgery for children like Emily is going to take place soon. More problems arise when Tess interrupts the entire crew, after Albert transported stolen merchandise, elsewhere. She confronts him, while they travel on a balloon, reestablishing their journey, while Monica must face her dislike of Ginger in order to convince her to help her daughter. Guest star: Tone Loc
20	9	"The Big Bang"	Chuck Bowman	Ken LaZebnik	November 25, 1995	207	16.2
Monica must help a bank owner, Max Chamberlain, and the pregnant wife of an angry fired bank worker who seeks revenge. Tess and Monica are also locked in a bank vault after a gas line explosion. Guest stars: Jeffrey Nordling, Lisa Jane Persky, Melora Hardin and Jack Scalia
21	10	"Unidentified Female"	Michael Schultz	Martha Williamson	December 2, 1995	208	14.9
A woman who witnesses a shooting has a burn on her finger and a hole in her memory. At a trendy magazine company, a real estate developer asks Tess if she knows how to fix elevators, fortunately, she can. Two detectives are rigorously interrogating her, and as she is cross examined, her scrambled memories eventually coalesce into a narrative. After being released, she is still in shock and denial. Revealing herself, Monica informs her that God has a purpose for her witnessing the incident and that she has a task to complete. Guest stars: Allison Smith, Alanna Ubach, Brian Bloom and Greg Evigan
22	11	"The Feather"	Gene Reynolds	Story by : Valerie Woods & Ken LaZebnik & Robin Sheets; Teleplay by : Valerie Woods & Ken LaZebnik	December 16, 1995	211	16.0
After Monica revealed herself at a Christmas pageant, (Note: From the season 1 episode "Fear Not!" (1994)) Charles, a con man turned crooked preacher, presents a feather as a miracle after it fell from a dove. He diverts piles of donations into his own pocket. Confronted by his brother Wayne, who used to scam with him but has repented, he is determined to stop him but Charles threatens to tell the truth about Wayne's past. The issue is brought to a head when a crack baby is brought to Charles to be healed. Guest stars: Randy Travis and William R. Moses
23	12	"The One That Got Away"	Victoria Hochberg	Debbie Smith & Danna Doyle	January 6, 1996	209	19.2
The Angels focus on 4 former classmates, a couple who rekindle their passion, a woman who is still reeling from the suicide of her fiance who was expelled for cheating on an exam, and a man who had been unaware of her fiance's death. But there's hope, and Andrew, the Angel of Death, is here. Monica meets him unannounced, whom Tess is well acquainted with. Guest star: Tracy Nelson Note: This episode marks the first appearance of John Dye as Andrew.
24	13	"'Til We Meet Again"	Tim Van Patten	Martha Williamson	January 13, 1996	210	19.5
Monica and Tess need to convince the family of a dying man to expose their secret before he dies. At the Carpenter house, Monica is a visiting nurse, while Tess is an interior decorator who both get caught up in the confrontational situation over Kim's behavior that Joe's daughter and son-in-law are both really opposed to. Guest stars: Joan Van Ark, Ed Begley Jr., Concetta Tomei and Priscilla Pointer
25	14	"Rock 'n' Roll Dad"	Tim Van Patten	Andrew Smith	January 20, 1996	212	20.9
Monica works as chauffeur and Tess as a nanny to Dylan for Jon Mateos, a rock star who has the world at his feet and the perfect life. But when his wife Evie dies, he goes back to his old drinking habits and as a result, his daughter Samantha nearly does as well. Guest stars: A Martinez, Kathleen Sullivan and Richard Roundtree
26	15	"Indigo Angel"	Jon Andersen	Glenn Berenbeim & R.J. Colleary	February 3, 1996	213	21.1
A grandfather who owns a blues club, which needs money to stay open, and is about to die, and who regularly loses his memory, is tricked by his son into signing the club over to him for money, as he refuses to close until the Countess (Tess) says so. Guest stars: Hal Linden, Al Jarreau, B.B. King, Dr. John and Al Hirt
27	16	"Jacob's Ladder"	Michael Schultz	Story by : Ken LaZebnik; Teleplay by : Martha Williamson	February 10, 1996	214	20.5
After Tess tells Monica that she went to the wrong address, Monica is arrested and put in a mental asylum for cocaine possession. However, the woman Monica shares a room with is actually an angel who has lost her way home. Also, the lawyer that Monica works with was associated with the angel, Claire, in the Vietnam War. Guest stars: Barbara Mandrell, Joe Morton, Cindy Williams and Paul Winfield
28	17	"Out of the Darkness"	Victoria Hochberg	R.J. Colleary	February 17, 1996	215	18.6
Monica helps Steve, a man who has been in a coma for 5 years, who learns upon awakening that his wife, Bonnie has divorced him and fallen in love with his business partner, while Steve must also face a painful legacy of child abuse---done to him by his father, and done by him to his own son, which helped end his marriage. Guest stars: Jane Kaczmarek, Brenda Vaccaro and Bradley Whitford Note: John Dye does not appear in this episode.
29	18	"Lost and Found"	Bethany Rooney	Debbie Smith & Danna Doyle	February 24, 1996	216	20.7
It's a battle between heaven and hell for the soul of a man who coordinates a center for missing children as his girlfriend lies to him and tries to make him go crazy with guilt over missing children. Monica and Tess try to convince him of God's love for him and all of the missing children. His "girlfriend" is fallen angel Kathleen in her second appearance. Guest stars: Bill Nunn and Jasmine Guy
30	19	"Dear God"	Tim Van Patten	Glenn Berenbeim	March 9, 1996	217	19.4
Monica must help a holocaust survivor, that works in a Post Office and answers letters to God, who has lost his faith in God to regain it and to also help a child whose father has died. Andrew met the child and Tess is being allured by Monica to ask God if they can read the letters. After hearing about the incident where his girlfriend has been abusing the girl, Monica was very unhappy, yet Tess reminds her that Max (not Tanya) was her assignment. Guest star: Elliott Gould
31	20	"Portrait of Mrs. Campbell"	Victor Lobl	Susan Cridland Wick	March 23, 1996	218	N/A
Monica, Tess and Andrew must help a mother and daughter-in-law, who live in the same house and hate each other, to mend their fragile relationship before the mother dies. The mother needs a bone marrow transplant or she will die and the daughter-in-law is pregnant. Also involved is a secret: The mother's disabled son Tommy. Guest stars: Gabrielle Carteris and Linda Gray
32	21	"The Quality of Mercy"	Chuck Bowman	Andrew Smith	April 27, 1996	219	15.5
A father who used to be a TV actor, suddenly goes through a mid-life crisis, trying to be the same actor he used to be. When his son gets the part in a school play and a series of events start when the father starts kissing a female student, the son is angry at his mother for moving to a new town and is angry with his father for what he has done. Meanwhile, his mother has fallen from a chair while trying to hang a picture. Monica, Tess and Andrew must intervene and get the son to forgive his father and mother before the family breaks up. Guest stars: Marsha Warfield, Ted Shackelford, Stephanie Faracy and Harley Cross
33	22	"Flesh and Blood"	Jon Andersen	R.J. Colleary	May 4, 1996	221	17.8
A delinquent young man is accused of killing a girl. Convinced he is innocent, his mother takes the bus to the courthouse everyday to attend his trial. Later, at home, she discovers some evidence which makes her doubt his innocence. Guest stars: Valerie Harper, Sally Jesse Raphael and Anthony Michael Hall Note: John Dye does not appear in this episode.
34	23	"Birthmarks"	Peter Hunt	Ken LaZebnik	May 11, 1996	222	16.8
A widower is angry with his son, daughter in law, and their surrogate for not having a pregnancy a normal way. His son is also dying. Because of his stubbornness, their surrogate leaves and refuses to give up the baby. Monica and Tess must help before the son dies. Tess gets in the Cadillac with Jolene and the baby in town, who wepts that Michael never held him. Tess also consoles Penny, by revealing that the birthmark he has, was a kiss from his father. Guest stars: William Daniels, David Naughton and Kathie Lee Gifford
35	24	"Statute of Limitations"	Victor Lobl	Danna Doyle & Debbie Smith	May 18, 1996	220	18.2
Morgan, a seemingly confident talk show host, is controlled by her obese, housebound sister Claudia via microphone for everything she says and does on the show. Claudia is bitter because of an accident that occurred when they were children. Guest stars: Darlene Cates, Paul Walker and Shanna Reed
