= Blake Robbins =

American actor and director (born 1965)

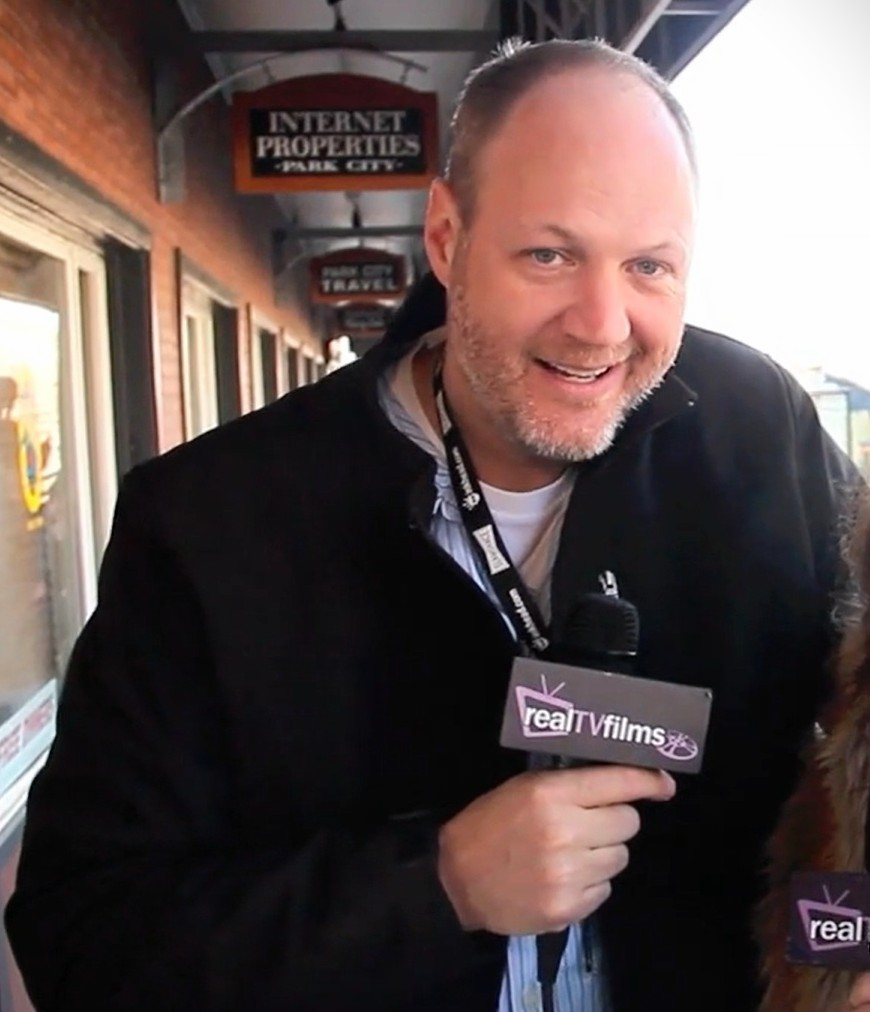
- Robbins in 2014
- Born: June 17, 1965 (age 61); Karamürsel, Turkey
- Citizenship: United States; Turkey
- Education: American Academy of Dramatic Arts
- Occupations: Actor; director
- Years active: 1996–present

Blake Robbins (born June 17, 1965) is an American actor and director of film and television. He appeared in the films Wind River, The Ugly Truth, Jayhawkers, and To Leslie. Robbins is also known for his guest-starring appearances as Officer Dave Brass on the HBO drama series Oz, Tom on the NBC sitcom The Office, and Mitch Glender on the FX crime drama series Sons of Anarchy, as well as supporting roles in Firefly, Law & Order, 24, Entourage, and The Bling Ring.

After almost two decades working as an actor, Robbins stepped behind the camera and made his directorial debut with the independent drama The Sublime and Beautiful, which premiered at the Slamdance Film Festival. His second feature as director, the modern-day western The Scent of Rain and Lightning starring Maika Monroe, received critical acclaim.

== Early life ==
Robbins was born in Karamürsel, Turkey, where his father served in the United States Navy. Robbins has one brother. His parents divorced when he was little and his mother remarried. Robbins had a strong connection with his stepfather, who died in April 2013. Robbins's biological father along with his brother struggled with alcoholism. After earning a degree in Business Marketing, Robbins attended the American Academy of Dramatic Arts in New York City. Soon after, he began to perform on Broadway, working also as an acting coach for a while. Robbins currently resides in Los Angeles.

== Career ==
Robbins began his career in 1996 with a guest appearance in an episode of the ABC soap opera All My Children. He went on to guest star in television series such as Law & Order, Third Watch and Firefly, before landing a recurring role as Officer Dave Brass in the HBO drama Oz between 2001 and 2003. During the 2000s, Robbins continued acting on the series Charmed, Strong Medicine, Medium, Crossing Jordan, The O.C., 24, Without a Trace, Criminal Minds and Private Practice. Robbins also appeared as Tom on the NBC's comedy The Office, opposite Steve Carell and John Krasinski.

Robbins' first film role was in the independent drama Going Under. Since then, he has appeared in other features including Love Comes to the Executioner, Bunker Hill, and the romantic comedy The Ugly Truth, in which he stars alongside Katherine Heigl and Gerard Butler.

Throughout the 2010s, Robbins guest-starred in several television series including FlashForward, The Closer, Rizzoli & Isles, CSI: NY, Sons of Anarchy, Masters of Sex and Legends. Simultaneously, Robbins worked on a number of independent films, namely Rubber, Jayhawkers, Martyrs and Wind River. More recently, he starred in the Marcel Sarmiento horror thriller Faceless.

Robbins made his directorial debut with the independent drama The Sublime and Beautiful, which he also wrote and stars in as David Conrad, a father who loses his children in a car accident. Shot in only 12 days on a budget of $30,000, the film premiered at the 2014 Slamdance Film Festival. Writing for Variety, film critic Ronnie Scheib stated that Robbins "brings nothing new to Hollywood's dead-children genre".

Robbins directed his second film, The Scent of Rain and Lightning, starring Maika Monroe. Based on the 2010 novel of the same name by Nancy Pickard, the story centers on Jody Linder (Monroe), a young woman who finds out the man responsible for murdering her parents has been released from prison. Having its world premiere at the Atlanta Film Festival, the film garnered a positive reception from critics; in his review for The Hollywood Reporter, Frank Scheck opined that it was "a well-acted, intelligent thriller".

== Filmography ==
=== Film ===
†	Denotes productions that have not yet been released

Year	Title	Role	Notes
2004	Going Under	Axel	
2005	Alice	The Intruder	Short film
2006	Love Comes to the Executioner	Stuttering Guard	
2006	Arc	Thomas Blake	
2007	The Son of Sam's Daughter	Ben's Dad	Short film
2008	Christmas Break	Mr. Chatsworth	Short film
2008	Bunker Hill	Delmar	
2009	The Only Good Indian	Moller	
2009	The Ugly Truth	KPQU Big Wig	
2010	Rubber	Cop Eric	
2011	Part Time Fabulous	Dr. Carr	
2011	Dispatch	Killer	
2012	The Men's Room	The Man	Short film
2012	Between the Forest and the Field	Daniel	Short film
2012	Blackout	Jimmy	Short film
2013	Imprints	Doctor	Short film
2013	Cliff	Dr. Keanon	Short film
2013	The Lull Breaker	Pa	Short film
2013	The Championship Rounds	Phillip	Short film
2014	The Sublime and Beautiful	David Conrad	also writer, producer and director
2014	Jayhawkers	Dick Harp	
2014	Buttwhistle	Mr. Blancmange	
2014	Moths	Mr. Cunningham	Short film
2015	Martyrs	Dad	
2016	Ctrl Alt Delete	Charlie	
2016	From Ashes to Immortality	Jon Orr	Short film
2017	Wind River	Tim	
2017	The Scent of Rain and Lightning	Sheriff Don Phelps	also director and producer
2017	DriverX	Rick	
2018	Funny Story	Dan	
2018	Backpedals	Hugo	Short film
2019	Let's Scare Julie	Uncle Vince	One-shot feature film
2019	Things That Fall	The Professor	Short film
2021	Faceless	Tom	
2022	To Leslie	The Handyman	
2024	Line of Fire	Bobby	Short film
2026	The Leader	Deputy Willis	

=== Television ===
Year	Title	Role	Notes
1996	All My Children	Valet	1 episode
1999	Law & Order	Heinrich	Episode: "Marathon"
2000	Third Watch	Peter	Episode: "History"
2002	Push, Nevada	Lexus Driver	Episode: "Jim's Domain"
2002	Firefly	Agent McGinnis	Episode: "Ariel"
2001–2003	Oz	Officer Dave Brass	15 episodes
2003	10-8: Officers on Duty	Dr. Lawrence	Episode: "Late for School"
2004	Cold Case	David Lake	Episode: "Late Returns"
2004	Charmed	Patrol Officer	Episode: "It's a Bad, Bad, Bad, Bad World: Part 1"
2004	Strong Medicine	Morgan Benedicto	Episode: "Healing Touch"
2005	Medium	Trooper	Episode: "A Priest, a Doctor and a Medium Walk Into an Execution Chamber"
2005	Crossing Jordan	Peter Ellison	Episode: "Embraceable You"
2005	Wanted	Martin Beckwith	Episode: "The Promise of Darkness"
2005	The O.C.	Don	2 episodes
2006	E-Ring	James Ogilvy	Episode: "Five Pillars"
2006	24	Ross	Episode: "Day 5: 2:00 a.m.-3:00 a.m."
2007	Without a Trace	Craig Dalton	Episode: "Connections"
2008	Eli Stone	Howard Masters	Episode: "Heartbeat"
2008	Criminal Minds	Jonathan Morris	Episode: "A Higher Power"
2008	Private Practice	Mark Miller	Episode: "A Family Thing"
2008	Entourage	Guy on Plane	Episode: "First Class Jerk"
2008–2009	The Office	Tom Halpert	2 episodes
2010	The Forgotten	Dr. Max Rayburn	Episode: "Patient John"
2010	FlashForward	Special Agent Buckner	4 episodes
2010	The Closer	Mr. Witten	Episode: "Heart Attack"
2010	Secret Millionaires	Dr. Cadillac	1 episode
2011	Rizzoli & Isles	Scott James	Episode: "Brown Eyed Girl"
2011	The Bling Ring	Mr. Bishop	Television film
2012	CSI: NY	Jimmy Portico	Episode: "2,918 Miles"
2012	NCIS	Scott Martin	Episode: "Gone"
2013	Monday Mornings	Dr. David Martin	Episode: "Pilot"
2013	Sons of Anarchy	Mitch Glender	2 episodes
2013	Masters of Sex	Security Guard Brown	Episode: "Manhigh"
2014	Legends	Dennis Evans	2 episodes
2015	The Ultimate Evil	David Berkowitz	unknown episodes
2017	Law & Order True Crime	Harry	3 episodes
2021	Bad Vibes	Rob	1 episode
2026	Wonder Man	Chuck Eastman	1 episode

== Awards and nominations ==
Award ceremony	Year	Work(s)	Category	Result	Ref.
Cleveland International Film Festival	2017	The Scent of Rain and Lightning	Best American Independent Feature Film	Nominated	
Kansas City FilmFest	2014	The Sublime and Beautiful	Heartland – Best Feature Narrative	Won	
Kansas City FilmFest	2014	The Sublime and Beautiful	Heartland – Best Narrative Feature	Won	
Kansas City FilmFest	2017	The Scent of Rain and Lightning	Best Narrative Feature	Won	
Milan International Film Festival	2014	The Sublime and Beautiful	Best Actor	Won	
Milan International Film Festival	2014	The Sublime and Beautiful	Best Director	Nominated	
Milan International Film Festival	2014	The Sublime and Beautiful	Best Best Screenwriting	Nominated	
Nashville Film Festival	2017	The Scent of Rain and Lightning	Bridgestone Narrative Feature Competition	Nominated	
Newport Beach Film Festival	2014	The Sublime and Beautiful	Directing	Won	
Newport Beach Film Festival	2014	The Sublime and Beautiful	Best Feature Film	Won	
Newport Beach Film Festival	2014	The Sublime and Beautiful	Best Actor	Won	
Slamdance Film Festival	2014	The Sublime and Beautiful	Best Narrative Feature	Nominated	
Slamdance Film Festival	2014	The Sublime and Beautiful	Narrative Feature Film	Nominated	
