= Touched by an Angel season 1 =

Touched by an Angel
- Season 1
- Starring: Roma Downey; Della Reese
- No. of episodes: 11

Release
- Original network: CBS
- Original release: September 21, 1994 – March 4, 1995

Season chronology
- Next → Season 2

The first season of the American dramatic television series Touched by an Angel premiered on CBS on September 21, 1994 where it ran for 11 episodes until it concluded on March 4, 1995. Created by John Masius and produced by Martha Williamson, the series chronicled the cases of two angels, Monica (Roma Downey) and her supervisor Tess (Della Reese), who bring messages from God to various people to help them as they reach a crossroads in their lives. A season set containing all of the episodes of the season was released to Region 1 DVD on August 31, 2004.

The episodes use the song "Walk with You", performed by Reese, as their opening theme.

== Cast ==
=== Starring ===
- Roma Downey as Monica
- Della Reese as Tess

=== Recurring ===
- Charles Rocket as Adam

== Episodes ==
No. overall	No. in season	Title	Directed by	Written by	Original release date	Prod. code	Viewers (millions)
1	1	"The Southbound Bus"	Jerry J. Jameson	Martha Williamson	September 21, 1994	101	13.7
Tess guides Monica on her first assignment as a case worker after being promoted from search and rescue. On the southbound bus, she befriends David Morrow, a young Wyoming boy who tells her that his mother and sister died in a car accident. After helping David fend off some bullies, Monica escorts him home. There she meets his father, Nick a police detective who is looking for a live-in nanny. Monica is hired on the spot, but soon has a chance encounter with Adam, the Angel of Death, who informs her that although David's sister, Katie died of crib death, his mother is very alive. Confronting the child with his untruth, Monica learns that his guilt-wracked mother left home afterwards and hasn't returned. She promises to bring his mother home and sets out to find her in Hewitt, leaving David is Tess's care. In a seedy cafe, Monica befriends two waitresses, and mistakes one of them as David's mother. She arranges a meeting between Ruth Ann and Nick, which backfires when the police officer recognizes the waitress as a wanted fugitive. The angel appeals to Ruth Ann to stop running, but she refuses to turn herself in. Returning to the cafe, Monica discovers the other waitress, Christine, is actually David's mother and reveals herself in an effort to persuade the women to return to her family. But Christine blames herself for Katie's death and refuses. In anguish, Monica prays for guidance and returns to David and Nick to deliver the bad news. The child is crushed, and Tess admonishes Monica for mishandling of the assignment. While Nick is outside comforting his son, Christine drives up in her red Cadillac, Monica's revelation convinced her to return home, thus reuniting the family. In gratitude, Christine gives the angels her car, which Tess gladly accepts. Guest stars: Linda Hart, T.J. Lowther, Mark Metcalf, Wendy Phillips and Charles Rocket
2	2	"Show Me the Way to Go Home"	Tim Bond	Chris Ruppenthal	September 28, 1994	102	12.7
Monica is assigned to Earl Rowley, a crusty baseball coach. Bitter because his Vietnam War injury prevented him from pursuing a major league career, he pushes his high school players hard, especially Peter Enloe, the star player whose own father died. Earl is less than thrilled to have a female assistant coach but is told that Monica was the only substitute teacher who had strong credentials in both history and baseball. Tess, in the meantime, accepts a position working in a sports bar run by Peter's mother, Laura. A few days before a crucial game, Earl appoints the young man team captain and tells him a college scout will be watching the game to see if Peter is worthy of a baseball scholarship. However, the coach also expects Peter to lead the team with his authoritarian leadership style. Prompted by Monica's history lesson that sometimes a person must stand up to a bully, the team captain takes a stand against Earl, which results in a fist fight and Peter's suspension from the team. While walking away, the coach collapses on the field and is rushed to the hospital. There Monica learns from Adam, that Earl is dying from pancreatic cancer. As he confides in Monica that the one time he let his guard down, a Vietnamese soldier shot him, he remembers that she was the one who saved him during the heat of the battle. He laments being spared since his life didn't turn out the way he had planned; she chides him for failing to take advantage of the numerous opportunities he had to positively influence their lives of his students. Although Monica reinstates Peter on the team, Laura realizes that what her son really needs is Earl's approval. She visits the coach in the hospital, to talk about Peter and is followed by Monica. But while the angel states her case, Earl's life signs diminish and Adam appears to escort him to the afterlife. Monica prays for him to have a second chance, a request that is granted. During the big game, the team is down three with two outs in the bottom of the ninth inning. Peter is on the verge of striking out when Earl appears and loans him the wooden bat his own father gave him. Peter hits a home run, winning the game and the scholarship. Afterwards, Adam arrives to take Earl, who requested that Monica hold his hand as they walk into the light. Guest stars: Ivan Sergei, Jarrad Paul and Kevin Dobson
3	3	"Tough Love"	Tim Van Patten	Del Shores	October 12, 1994	104	12.9
Monica serves as the personal assistant to Elizabeth Jessup, a prominent journalist, and the angel soon learns that her new assignment has a serious drinking problem. At a birthday party for her granddaughter Beth, Liz has too much to drink, which prompts her own daughter Sydney to take her daughter home. Soon afterwards, the newswoman makes a spectacle of herself while giving a speech at the Mayor's Centennial kick-off. This incident causes Sydney to stage an intervention for her mother with the help of Anita, a counselor at the New Hope Center. But this action backfires and an enraged Liz orders her guests to leave her house. The next day, Monica returns to work and learns that Liz had started drinking to fit in with her male counterparts. Monica convinces her employer to visit the New Hope Center. However, upon seeing Anita, Liz loses her temper and storms out of the building. Although Sydney refuses to let Beth have contact with her grandmother, the child sneaks out to see Liz anyway. While Beth is playing, Liz accidentally sets the house on fire with a cigarette. Monica rescues the little girl, whose grandmother was too drunk to comprehend what happened. At the hospital, an irate Sydney confronts her mother for leaving Beth inside the house to die. Returning to the wreckage to find a music box her granddaughter cherishes, Liz encounters Monica, realizing the angel was the one who saved Beth. Encouraged by Monica's revelation, Liz returns to the New Hope Center and attends a counseling session where she learns that Sydney herself is a recovering alcoholic. Guest star: Phylicia Rashad
4	4	"Fallen Angela"	Bruce Kessler	Martha Williamson and Marilyn Osborn	October 19, 1994	103	12.4
Understanding of Monica's seasickness, Tess begs her to work in the water, who needs to overcome her fear of water when she moves next door to Angela Evans, an avid boater with a secretive past. Years ago during college, she supported herself as a call girl. Now that her husband Carter is running for the U.S. Senate, she is being blackmailed by Marshall, her former pimp. Monica convinces Angela to stand up to him, but learns that the ruthless man had taken photographs of her in compromising positions. Rather than tell Carter the truth, she attempts suicide by intentionally sinking her boat in the middle of the lake. Adam, the Angel of Death, cautions Monica not to violate Angela's free will by rescuing her. The resourceful angel shows the woman how her suicide would affect her loved ones, and she chooses to live. Revealing herself after the rescue, Monica admits to Tess, about overcoming her own fear of water when she saw Angela about to drown and encourages her to return home and confide in Carter. Together, the Evans decide to hold a press conference regarding Angela's past, freeing them from the threat of further blackmail. Guest stars: Nia Peeples, Rick Rossovich and Obba Babatundé
5	5	"Cassie's Choice"	Burt Brinkerhoff	Dawn Prestwich and Nicole Yorkin	October 26, 1994	105	12.0
Teenager Cassie Peters is pregnant and plans to give her baby up for adoption. Although neither Craig (the baby's father) nor Joanne (Cassie's mother) is present for the delivery, Monica is, posing as a nurse. After holding her new daughter, Cassie changes her mind and runs away from the hospital, much to the chagrin of the Feldmans, the adoptive parents. Cassie rides a bus to another town where Craig's rock band is playing in a nightclub, but Craig is startled to see Cassie and says he has no interest in raising the baby. Cassie, unwilling to return to her mother, and having no money, pawns her flute to get a few dollars to survive. Monica and Tess are keeping watch over the mother and child when they learn from Adam that the child is seriously ill. Monica gently prods Cassie to take the child to the hospital, where the teenager begins to realize she is not ready for the rigors of motherhood. Monica's revelation reinforces this fact, and Cassie returns home and gives the baby to the Feldmans. Cassie's mother welcomes her and assures her that she will not judge her. At the infant dedication, Mrs. Feldman announces that she and Ben have named their baby Faith. Cassie asks for a moment with her daughter and plays the flute, which Monica had reclaimed, for her legacy of music that runs in the family. Guest stars: Alyson Hannigan, Rodney Eastman and Susan Ruttan
6	6	"The Heart of the Matter"	Max Tash	Chris Ruppenthal	November 2, 1994	106	12.9
Appearing on computer, Tess gives Monica a job as a legal assistant to a young lawyer, Charles Hibbard. He mistakenly gives a $200,000 inheritance to an eccentric, free-spirited young woman named Robin, and must convince her to give it back, but she has spent $70,000 of it. This entails Monica and Charles returning various unusual merchandise Robin had impulsively bought, and then confronting some menacing men at a biker bar, where Monica startles them with some amazing Billard game tricks. According to Tess, Charles is a hypochondriac with an imagined heart condition. Monica helps him to open his heart and he falls in love with Robin, who describes her childhood in an orphanage, to which she then revisits and donates some of her inheritance, which Charles covers by offering to sell his authentic Alexander Hamilton expense book. Guest stars: Wendy Makkena and Peter Scolari
7	7	"An Unexpected Snow"	Timothy Bond	Martha Williamson	December 7, 1994	107	11.2
Monica and Tess arrange an accident on a deserted road for Megan and Susana, two women involved with the same man, but who had never met. The angels arrange a beautiful estate nearby where the women and later Susana's husband spend Thanksgiving together. They are assisted by Adam, who doesn't have the heart to kill the turkey for dinner. Monica convinces Megan she must find someone else, and Tess tells Susana and her husband, who are assigned a private cabin, that they must reconcile and return to their marriage. Guest stars: Nancy Allen, Brooke Adams and Ed Marinaro
8	8	"Manny"	Tim Van Patten	Dawn Prestwich and Nicole Yorkin	December 14, 1994	108	11.5
Monica and Tess are party coordinators for Harrison Trowbridge Archibald IV, a stuffy doctor whose wife, Barbara, and mother, Amelia, are planning a prestigious social event to commemorate a new hospital expansion named after their family. They are in the midst of preparation when Manny arrives at their doorstep, claiming to be a child the Archibalds sponsor through Child Watch, a charitable organization. Unable to have children of her own, Barbara welcomes him with open arms although her husband remains suspicious. Just as Harrison starts to bond with "Manny," Monica learns the boy is not from Child Watch, but is really Luis, a homeless child who lives under the hospital. The angel reveals herself and urges him to tell the Archibalds the truth. When he does, Harrison becomes irate and wants to throw Luis out of the house, but Barbara and Amelia convince the doctor to wait until after the party. Tess, in turn, prods Amelia to tell her son the truth about his heritage: not only are the Bowthorpes of Charleston really the Klumps of Bowthorpe, but Harrison's real father was an Argentinean gardener who was kind to Amelia when she and her husband were experiencing marital difficulties. After the doctor announces that the hospital expansion will be simply called The Children's Pavilion, he encounters Monica who delivers the message that God loves him for who he is, not for his name. She then takes the doctor to Luis' hiding place in the hospital basement. Taking the child back home, Harrison and his wife decide to adopt him and become a family. Guest stars: Gail Edwards, Robin Thomas and Rue McClanahan
9	9	"Fear Not!"	Tim Van Patten	Ken LaZebnik	December 25, 1994	110	14.2
A small town church is putting on its Christmas pageant, that Monica and Tess are a part of, and little Serena desperately wants to be the angel. Her slightly developmentally delayed friend Joey, must come to terms with the fact that Serena is dying of a heart condition. Joey is pathologically afraid of the dark--his parents went out into the night and never came back. Since then, his older brother Wayne has been his caregiver, and resented it. Monica reveals herself to Wayne, but he holds God responsible for his lousy life. When Serena dies the night of the pageant, Joey is led to the church by a bright star. Wayne is there, too. Monica takes Serena's place as the angel in the pageant. When the rope supporting her breaks, Monica rises with glory and power and the entire congregation is awed by her angelic revelation and message: "Fear Not." Guest star: Randy Travis
10	10	"There But for the Grace of God"	Bruce Bilson	Story by : Martha Williamson; Teleplay by : Martha Williamson and R.J. Colleary	February 25, 1995	111	14.5
Monica is stripped of her angelic powers to help a proud, homeless man named Pete. She also befriends Sophie and Zack, a Desert Storm vet. Hearing Pete doesn't want to meet an angel, Tess confronts Monica on not getting involved with him, who raises her voice, in front of her boss. Tess also explains to Monica, who needs to feel like something else altogether, and Pete's a fighter, who's been hit too many times, from one blow to another. Monica realizes that she has stood judgement on homeless people and after a prayer she washes Pete's feet. Sophie is reunited with her family. Zack trades his Marine corp rine for Pete's wife's ashes and a quarter to call home. With God's help, Pete is able to go to Colorado to spread his wife's ashes. Tess encourages Monica, to not give up who she really is, and they hugged. Guest stars: Malcolm-Jamal Warner, Gregory Harrison and Marion Ross
11	11	"The Hero"	Max Tash	Marilyn Osborn	March 4, 1995	109	13.5
Three years ago, James Mackey defused a tense hostage situation by shooting the gunman who had fatally wounded James's partner. Now, Monica is a journalist writing a story about the small-town sheriff and local hero for Tapford County. Although a loving father, Mackey places intense pressure on his son Matthew, so he can gain admission to the U.S. Naval Academy in Annapolis. Rather than risk not doing well, the boy cheats on a college entrance exam but gets caught. Afraid of how his father will react, Matt attempts suicide. While in a coma, Monica uses her angelic powers to talk to him and convince him to live. Tess knows the young man is to be redeemed. Monica helps Sheriff Mackey resolve his own inner torment, his late partner, Nick Hansen, was the true hero. Mackey had frozen when they confronted the criminals, and Nick saved his life. Monica convinces Mackey that God loves him regardless and is able to reunite father and son. Guest stars: Bryan Cranston and John Amos
