= Mike McShane =

American actor, singer and comedian

- Born: Michael McShane; Boston, Massachusetts, U.S.
- Occupations: Actor, singer, comedian
- Years active: 1986–present

Michael McShane is an American actor, singer, and improvisational comedian. He appeared on the original British version of the television show Whose Line Is It Anyway? (1988–97) and went on to appear in films such as: Tucker: The Man and His Dream (1988), Robin Hood: Prince of Thieves (1991), Richie Rich (1994) and Office Space (1999). McShane has also been involved in several Disney productions, including: Tom and Huck (1995), the television series Brotherly Love (1995–97), Tower of Terror (1997) and A Bug's Life (1998). He also voiced the Revolting Slob in the Canadian-American variety television series Crashbox.

McShane voiced: Marlon, Caracticus P. Doom and various other characters in Cosgrove Hall Films's Avenger Penguins (1993–94), Gareb in Todd McFarlane's Spawn (1997–99), and Quosmir in Dave The Barbarian (2004–05).

== Career ==
McShane studied drama at San Joaquin Delta College and San Francisco State University, performing with Faultline Theatre, the San Francisco Shakespeare Festival, American Conservatory Theater and the Eureka Theatre. McShane is also an alumnus of Los Angeles Theatresports.

McShane gained exposure in 1988 on the British show Whose Line Is It Anyway?. He remained a regular performer on the show for the next ten years. McShane and fellow Whose Line regular Tony Slattery starred in the comedy sketch show S&M in 1991. In 1992 McShane starred in the sitcom The Big One alongside another Whose Line performer Sandi Toksvig.

Other TV roles include a guest appearance on Seinfeld as Kramer's nemesis Franklin Delano Romanowski (FDR). McShane played Friar Tuck in Robin Hood, Prince of Thieves in 1991, had a small role as a doomed hypnotherapist in the 1999 film Office Space, and played the friendly scientist, Professor Keenbean, in the 1994 movie Richie Rich. In 1998 he appeared in an episode of Frasier as Frank, the manager of the Shangri-La apartments. He also co-starred with Sir John Gielgud, Emily Watson and Rosemary Harris in "A Summer's Day Dream" for BBC "Performance" series.

In 1995, McShane starred as Harley in the BBC Screen Two TV Movie Crazy For A Kiss, about a young boy who is sent to a mental institution for teenagers in McShane's home state of Kansas. McShane appeared in Tom and Huck as Muff Potter and on Brotherly Love as the experienced but wisecracking mechanic, Lloyd.

In 1997 he appeared in Tower of Terror, a TV movie starring Steve Guttenberg and Kirsten Dunst based on the Disney attraction, as "Q".

McShane also appeared with Dunst in the 1999 comedy film Drop Dead Gorgeous, playing a quick-tempered beauty pageant judge who serves as caretaker for his learning disabled brother.

McShane provided voice work for the anime Vampire Hunter D: Bloodlust, as D's sarcastic possessed left hand. He also provided the voice of Detective Twitch in the HBO animated series Spawn. Other voice work by McShane includes the characters of Tuck and Roll, the twin pill bugs in A Bug's Life and the video game of the same name in 1998. He also provided the voice of Shalulu in Disney's redub of Castle in the Sky, and Baron Rakan Harkonnen in the 2001 strategy game Emperor: Battle for Dune. He provided the voice for Cid in the video games Final Fantasy X and Final Fantasy X-2.

McShane appeared as the voice of Audrey II (as well as playing a number of peripheral characters) in the London revival of Little Shop of Horrors at the Menier Chocolate Factory in Southwark between December 2006 and February 2007. The show was a critical success and was sold out for the duration of its run. Mike was then contracted following the show's transfer to the West End at the Duke of York theatre, continuing his role. His voice acting as Audrey II was described in The Guardian as “lovely work… the molasses-rich voice of Audrey II, sneakily sliding from dulcet to needling to monstrously arrogant.” In September 2007 he took part in the British Library's celebration of Jack Kerouac, reading excerpts from On The Road on the 50^{th} anniversary of its publication.

In 2008, McShane appeared as a guest performer in Paul Merton's Impro Chums, a live improv show, and was asked to join the permanent company for three UK tours. He continues as a member of the group, which is now named Paul Merton & Suki Webster's Improv Show. McShane portrayed Dr. Vaabit in episode 5 of BBC's sitcom Lab Rats, and has appeared twice on the BBC radio programme Just a Minute.

In September 2012, McShane appeared as the character Grayle in the television series Doctor Who in the series 7 episode "The Angels Take Manhattan". In November 2012, Mike starred as a CIA military consultant in BBC Three comedy series Bluestone 42. In February 2013, Mike created the role of Louis B. Mayer in the new musical "The Tailor Made Man" at The Arts Theatre in London's West End, garnering rave reviews.

On May 17, 2013, Radio 5 Live's breakfast show accidentally announced Mike McShane had died. This was following the death of Paul Shane on May 16, 2013. A retraction was issued.

In 2014, McShane was in the horror comedy film Love in the Time of Monsters. From November 2014 through March 2015, he appeared in the Stephen Sondheim musical Assassins at the Menier Chocolate Factory.

In August 2015, McShane appeared at an Edinburgh Fringe gala regarding mental health issues. At the same time, he paid tribute to his friend, Robin Williams. McShane said: "I worked with Robin when we were young and he came to see me backstage in the past, too. Any improviser my age or younger was inspired by him... Even with his condition, he was still doing benefit gigs, making servicemen laugh and championing young acts. He would pick you up and make you feel like the exploration of your imagination and expression was a good thing. Laughter is good. It's group consensus and a release of tension."

In 2016, McShane starred as Sam in the Western web series Red Bird.

== Filmography ==
=== Film ===
Mike McShane' film credits
Year	Title	Role	Notes
1988	Tucker: The Man and His Dream	Recording Engineer	
1990	The Spirit of '76	Angry Driver	
1990	Best Shots	Friendly Bob	
1991	Robin Hood: Prince of Thieves	Friar Tuck	
1994	Richie Rich	Professor Keenbean	
1995	Tom and Huck	Muff Potter	
1995	Balto		Extra voices
1997	Princess Mononoke		Additional voices
1997	Coronation Street: Viva Las Vegas!	Maxwell Baxter	Direct-to-Video
1997	Todd McFarlane's Spawn	Twitch Williams / Gareb (voice)	Direct-to-Video
1998	Todd McFarlane's Spawn 2	Gareb (voice)	
1998	A Bug's Life	Tuck / Roll (voice)	
1999	Todd McFarlane's Spawn 3: The Ultimate Battle	Gareb (voice)	
1999	Office Space	Dr. Swanson	
1999	Drop Dead Gorgeous	Harold Vilmes / Judge #2	
2000	The Gold Cup	Jerry	
2000	Vampire Hunter D: Bloodlust	Left Hand (voice)	
2002	Big Trouble	Bruce	
2002	Thunder Pig	Thunderpig (voice)	Short film
2002	Treasure Planet	Hands (voice)	
2003	Castle in the Sky	Charles (voice)	Latest English Dub
2003	Kaena: The Prophecy	Assad (voice)	
2003	The Battle of Shaker Heights	Mr. Norway	
2003	Evil Alien Conquerors	Rabirr	
2004	Memron	Ken Clay	Mockumentary
2004	Death and Texas	Prison Guard	
2005	Thru the Moebius Strip	Hymo (voice)	
2006	Happily N'Ever After	Rumplestiltskin (voice)	
2007	Careless	Naked Man	
2009	The Witch	Father	Short film
2014	Love in the Time of Monsters	Slavko	

=== Television ===
Mike McShane' television credits
Year	Title	Role	Notes
1988–1997	Whose Line Is It Anyway?	Himself	43 episodes
1991	Arena	Fatty Arbuckle / The God of Hollywood	Episode: "Hollywood Babylon"; Documentary series
1991	S&M	Himself	7 episodes (1 series)
1992	The Big One	James Howard	7 episodes
1992	The Comic Strip Presents...	Bernard Matthews	Episode: "Wild Turkey"
1993	The Young Indiana Jones Chronicles	Anton Dvorak	Episode: "Prague, August 1917"
1993–1994	Avenger Penguins	Marlon / Caractacus P. Doom / Barracuda Stink (voice)	9 episodes
1994	The All New Alexei Sayle Show	Uncle Frank	1 episode
1994	Broadway Stories	Narrator	10 episodes
1992–1994	Performance	Franklyn Heimer / Hal	2 episodes
1994–1995	Jackanory	Storyteller	5 episodes
1995	Screen Two	Harley	Episode: "Crazy for a Kiss"
1996	ER	Hugo	Episode: "The Match Game"
1996	The Wonderful World of Disney	Chris 'Q' Todd	Episode: "Tower of Terror"
1995–1997	Brotherly Love	Lloyd Burwell	40 episodes
1997	Aaahh!!! Real Monsters	Timid Man / Customer #1 / Mallard (voice)	2 episodes
1997–1998	Seinfeld	Franklin Delano Romanowski	2 episodes
1997–1998	Frasier	Frank	Episode: "How to Bury a Millionaire"
1998	Caroline in the City	Boo	Episode: "Caroline and the Fright Before Christmas"
1999	Honey, I Shrunk the Kids: The TV Show	Klounberg	Episode: "Honey, I'm Not Just Clowning Around"
1997–1999	Todd McFarlane's Spawn	Gareb / Twitch Williams / Cain / Minister	17 episodes
2000–2001	Clerks: The Animated Series	Locksmith / Officer Big Mac / Priest / Randal's Japanese husband / X (voice)	3 episodes
2000	The Drew Carey Show	Ray	2 episodes
2000	3^{rd} Rock from the Sun	Phil	Episode: "InDickscretion"
2001	The Legend of Tarzan	Thug (voice)	Episode: "Tarzan and the Missing Link"
2001	Samurai Jack	Drake Nightshade (voice)	3 episodes
2002	Animated Tales of the World	Narrator	Episode: "A Story from Taiwan: Aunt Tiger"
2002	The Court	Ohio Attorney General	Episode: "Life Sentence"
2002	Believe Nothing	Professor Brinsley	Episode: "Double First"
2002	John Doe	Ray Brunellas	Episode: "John Deux"
2003	King of the Hill	Mountain Man (voice)	Episode: "Full Metal Dust Jacket"
2003	Oliver Beene	Fat Man	Episode: "Home, a Loan"
2004	Dave the Barbarian	Quozmir / Ted / Enchanted Tree (voice)	3 episodes
2005	Malcolm in the Middle	Dr. Phelps	Episode: "Living Will"
2006–2007	Holly Hobbie & Friends	Jim Bidderman / Station Manager	2 episodes
2008	Lab Rats	Dr. Vaabit	Episode: "A Bee"
2009	Nick Jr. IDs		Episode: "Pilot"
2010	Glenn Martin, DDS	Judge (voice)	Episode: "The Tooth Shall Set You Free"
2010	American Dad!	Brian P. Mahon (voice)	Episode: "Don't Look a Smith Horse in the Mouth"
2012	Doctor Who	Grayle	Episode: "The Angels Take Manhattan"
2013	Third String Kicker	Ned Finkelstein	Episode: "Ned Finkelstein: World's Worst Lawyer"
2013	Bluestone 42	Carter	1 episode
2014	You'll Be Fine	Evan Edwards	Episode: "Company Policy"
2015	Wayward Pines	Big Bill	4 episodes
2016	The Crossroads of History	Priest	Episode: "King Louis XIV"
2016	Red Bird	Sam	3 episodes
2019	NCIS: Los Angeles	Warden John Newton	Episode: "The One That Got Away"
2020	Barbarians	Aldarich (voice)	2 episodes
2022	NCIS	Dr. Matthew Heller	Episode: "Unearth"

=== Video games ===
Mike McShane' video game credits
Year	Title	Voice role	Description
1997	Blade Runner	Marcus Eisenduller / Hawker's Barkeep / Sergeant Walls	Based on the game it is not a direct adaptation of Ridley Scott's 1982 film Blade Runner
1998	A Bug's Life	Tuck / Roll	Based on the Disney/Pixar 1998 film of the same name
2001	Emperor: Battle for Dune	Baron Rakan Harkonnen	Sequel to Dune videogame
2001	Final Fantasy X	Cid	Developed and published by Square as the tenth main entry in the Final Fantasy series
2003	Final Fantasy X-2	Cid	

=== Podcast ===
Mike McShane' podcast credits
Year	Title	Role	Notes
2021	The Zip Code Plays: Los Ángeles	William Mulholland	Episode: "90026: Echo Park - $10 and a Tambourine"
