= There Will Be No Stay =

- Directed by: Patty Ann Dillon
- Written by: Patty Ann Dillon
- Produced by: Patty Ann Dillon
- Starring: Allen Ault, Craig Baxley, Terry Bracey, Bill Pelke, Carroll Pickett, Jim Willet
- Cinematography: Jeremy Osbern
- Edited by: Nicholas Fackler
- Music by: Sam Martin
- Production companies: T.W.B.N.S, Through a Glass Productions
- Distributed by: FilmBuff
- Release date: March 1, 2015
- Running time: 71 Minutes
- Country: United States
- Language: English
- Budget: $200,000

There Will Be No Stay is 2015 documentary by Patty Ann Dillon that discusses the death penalty from the point of view of the executioners. It premiered at the 2015 Big Sky Documentary Film Festival. It is described as "A journey of compassion and consequence through a process shrouded in secrecy,” where executioners' lives "intersect on a path to discovering freedom from their own personal prisons."

== Production ==
There Will Be No Stay was originally titled "To Kill The Killer." It was the first episode in a 13-part documentary series that Patty Ann Dillon wrote called Dichotomy of Death originally intended for television. Dillion then changed her mind and decided to make a documentary. Dillon wrote, directed, and produced the film. It was filmed on a small estimated budget of $200,000 from October 15, 2012 - April 5, 2013 with ex-executioners in Sioux Falls, South Dakota; Wilmington, North Carolina; Omaha, Nebraska; and Texas. In 2013 a Kickstarter was launched but was unsuccessful.

The film had its world premiere at the 2015 Big Sky Documentary Film Festival, followed by Cinequest Film Festival, and the Omaha Film Festival. The film has been nominated for five awards including Best Feature Length Documentary and Audience Choice at Big Sky Documentary Film Festival, Best Feature Documentary and Audience Choice at Cinequest, and again for Audience Choice at the Omaha Film Festival.

=== Release nationwide ===
The movie was released nationwide via distributor FilmBuff beginning January 19, 2016.
