= Through a Glass Productions =

Through A Glass Productions is a film and video production company, formed in Lawrence, Kansas, United States. The company works in feature film, music video, commercial, and documentary production, providing both content producing and crew services.

== Notable commercial work ==
- "Free The Music" - MTV (production company)
- "The Ivan Brothers" - Capital One (Danny Manning Interview shot for Harvest Films)
- "Just Too Good To Be True by E. Lynn Harris" - Doubleday (production company)

== Notable film work ==
- Air: The Musical (production company)
- Andy McKee: Joyland (production company)
- Up in the Air (production services)
- The Only Good Indian (production services)
- Last Breath (production services)
- Suspension (production services)
- Nailbiter (production services)
- The Empty Acre (production services)
- Langston’s Lawrence (production services)

== Notable music video work ==
- Andy McKee - "Hunter's Moon" (production company)
- Andy McKee - "Everybody Wants to Rule the World" (production company)
- Andy McKee - "Joyland" (production company)
- Andy McKee - "Never Grow Old" (production company)
- Lacuna Coil - "I Like It" (production services)
