= Jayhawkers (film) =

- Film poster
- Directed by: Kevin Willmott
- Written by: Scott Richardson; Kevin Willmott
- Produced by: Chris Blunk; Scott Richardson; J.S. Hampton
- Starring: Kip Niven; Justin Wesley; Blake Robbins; Trai Byers; Jay Karnes
- Cinematography: Matt Jacobson; Jeremy Osbern
- Edited by: Stephen Deaver
- Production companies: Audax Films; Through A Glass Productions
- Release date: March 7, 2014
- Country: United States
- Language: English
- Budget: $2 million

Jayhawkers is a 2014 American sports drama/biographical film directed by Kevin Willmott, following the life of Wilt Chamberlain, Phog Allen, and the 1956–57 Kansas Jayhawks men's basketball team. Former Kansas basketball player Scot Pollard portrays B. H. Born in the film.

== Synopsis ==
The film, which was shot entirely in black and white, depicts Kansas basketball coach Phog Allen's recruitment of Wilt Chamberlain, the dedication of Allen Fieldhouse, and Allen's forced retirement. The film also follows Chamberlain's adjustment to life in Lawrence and his battle to help end segregation in the city, as well as the racism he experienced traveling for road games. The film depicts the Jayhawks triple overtime loss in the 1957 National Championship Game to North Carolina.

== Cast ==
- Kip Niven – Forrest "Phog" Allen
- Justin Wesley – Wilt Chamberlain
- Blake Robbins – Dick Harp
- Jay Karnes – Chancellor Franklin Murphy
- Trai Byers – Nathan Davis
- Joseph Lee Anderson – Maurice King
- Walter Coppage – Langston Hughes

Additionally, former Kansas basketball player Scot Pollard makes a brief appearance as fellow former Kansas basketball player B. H. Born.

== Production ==
A portion of the budget was raised through the crowd-funding site Kickstarter, with over $54,000 raised. Shot in Lawrence, Kansas, Topeka, Kansas, and Leavenworth, Kansas, the film stars then-current Kansas Basketball player Justin Wesley as Chamberlain. The 6-foot-9 forward was recommended for the role by KU coach Bill Self to Willmott.

A teaser trailer was shown at Late Night in the Phog 2012, The film premiered in Lawrence, Kansas, on February 14, 2014, and made its public debut on February 28, 2014 at Liberty Hall near the University of Kansas campus.

Willmott, a film professor at the University of Kansas, cast multiple alumni of the school in the film, including Kip Niven, Jay Karnes, Trai Byers, and former basketball players Scot Pollard and Justin Wesley.

== Reception ==
Ben Sachs of The Chicago Reader said he “admired Willmott’s skill in executing the basketball sequences, which illustrate more vividly than in most sports movies how athletics can become an outlet for personal and professional anxieties.” Loey Lockerby of The Kansas City Star wrote, “Willmott offers a creative and intriguing look at Lawrence in the 1950s.”

In 2020, The New Yorker critic Richard Brody wrote an article revisiting the film, praising it as “an exemplary, even thrilling, historical drama." Brody said, "All of the subjects woven into the drama are treated substantially and considered in detail — especially the politics of race and of the nascent, and widely resisted, civil-rights movement.”
