= Air: The Musical =

- Directed by: Jeremy Osbern
- Written by: Jeremy Osbern, Chris Blunk
- Produced by: Chris Blunk, Jeremy Osbern
- Starring: Ian Stark; Megan Carter; Granvile O'Neal; Brenda Harvey; Dylan Paul Hilpmann; Jennifer Coville
- Cinematography: Jeremy Osbern
- Edited by: Mark von Schlemmer
- Music by: Steve Unruh
- Production company: Through A Glass Productions
- Distributed by: Cinema Epoch
- Release date: April 6, 2010
- Running time: 100 minutes
- Country: United States
- Language: English

Air: The Musical is an independent feature film directed by Jeremy Osbern and starring Ian Stark, Megan Carter, Granvile O'Neal, Brenda Harvey, Dylan Paul Hilpmann, and Jennifer Coville. The film received screenings in 2007 and 2008, and was officially released to DVD on 6 April 2010. AIR: The Musical was filmed and produced in Lawrence, Kansas between the years of 2004 and 2008.

== Premise ==
The film follows six individuals, all of whom are struggling to find their place in the world.

== Cast ==
- Ian Stark as Dan
- Megan Carter as Sarah
- Granvile O'Neal as Malcolm
- Brenda Harvey as Julie Anne
- Dylan Paul Hilpmann as Donnie
- Jennifer Coville as Kathy

== Reception ==
The Newton Kansan wrote a favorable review for Air: The Musical, stating "Every Kansan needs to see this movie — if only to reinforce the idea there are talented people right here where we live." The film was featured as the cover story of issue #58 of Indie Slate Magazine.
