= The Only Good Indian =

- Original poster
- Directed by: Kevin Willmott
- Written by: Tom Carmody
- Produced by: Tom Carmody
- Starring: Wes Studi; J. Kenneth Campbell
- Cinematography: Matt Jacobson; Jeremy Osbern
- Edited by: Sean Blake; Vicky Goetz; Thad Nurski; Mark von Schlemmer
- Music by: Kip Haaheim
- Release date: January 16, 2009
- Running time: 114 minutes
- Country: United States
- Languages: English, Kickapoo

The Only Good Indian is a 2009 American independent Western film directed by Kevin Willmott.

The film was shot almost entirely in Kansas—the only exception being a scene at Missouri's Ha Ha Tonka State Park—featuring locations such as the Monument Rocks and Fort Larned.

Filming took place in 2007–2008, and the movie premiered at the 2009 Sundance Film Festival, subsequently showing at other film festivals. The film won Willmott "Best Director" honors at the American Indian Film Festival, as well as acting honors for Wes Studi and Winter Fox Frank in his debut as the Kickapoo youth.

== Plot ==
The story is set in Kansas during the early 1900s. A Kickapoo youth (newcomer Winter Fox Frank) is taken from his family and forced to attend a distant Indian boarding school, designed to achieve to his assimilation into White society. When he escapes to return to his family, Sam Franklin (Wes Studi), a bounty hunter of Cherokee descent, is hired to find and return him to the school.

Franklin, a former Indian scout for the U.S. Army, has renounced his Native heritage. He has adopted the White Man's way of life, believing it is the only way for Indians to survive. Along the way, a tragic incident spurs Franklin's longtime nemesis, noted "Indian Fighter" Sheriff Henry McCoy (J. Kenneth Campbell), to pursue both Franklin and the boy.

The film featured both the Kickapoo language and members of the Kickapoo tribe.

== Cast ==
- Wes Studi as Sam Franklin
- J. Kenneth Campbell as Sheriff Henry McCoy
- Winter Fox Frank as Charlie
- Paul Butler as Harkin
- Thirza Defoe as Sally
- Christopher Wheatley as Mean Joe
- Laura Kirk as Miss Harris
- Delanna Studi as Aquene

== Reception ==
The film premiered in 2009 at the Sundance Film Festival, and was shown at numerous other festivals. It won awards for its director and leads at the American Indian Film Festival.

Robert W. Butler of the Kansas City Star thought that Wilmott was well-intentioned but did not fully realize the reach of revisionist history. Audiences have liked it but the film has not had wide distribution. The Hollywood Reporter praised Studi's performance.

Travis Keune, reviewing the film at the Saint Louis Film Festival, said that it started with a great premise and, while the execution was flawed, it was worth watching.
