= List of Rhode Island International Horror Film Festival selections =

This is a list of films shown at the Rhode Island International Horror Film Festival (RIIHFF). The RIIHFF, described by Diabolique Magazine as "one of the top horror film festivals in the world", is the largest and longest-running horror film festival in New England. A jury chooses the festival's official selections to highlight leading horror films from around the world and to draw the public's interest to the New England film industry. The festival typically receives hundreds of submissions each year, from which only a handful are chosen. The 2012 Rhode Island International Horror Film Festival selected 63 films out of 461 submissions from 20 countries.

Multiple films have made their U.S. or international premieres at the RIIHFF. In 2004, six festival entries made their U.S. premiere, and five made their world premiere. Other films premiering at the festival have included: Dark Remains (2005), Day X (2005), Pretty Dead Things (2006), Sea of Dust (2008), Chloe and Attie (2009), and Sudden Death! (2010).

A number of films are accepted into the festival as non-competition entries. In its early years, the RIIHFF screened formerly lost and restored films, most often silent films with live accompaniment, at the historic Columbus Theatre. These have included Tales of the Uncanny (1919), Der Golem (1920), Nosferatu (1922), and The Phantom of the Opera (1925). In 2010, the festival offered a special world premiere screening of a restored, high definition version of Roger Corman's The Fall of the House of Usher (1960). The festival has also showcased cult and foreign horror films. From 2003 to 2004, the festival featured the "Japanese Horror Film Showcase", from which Shunsuke Yamamoto's The Strange Killers won the Viola M. Marshall Audience Choice Award. The 2006 screening of Day of the Dead was attended by cast member Gary Howard Klar. In addition, exclusive film screenings have included All the Love You Cannes! and Citizen Toxie: The Toxic Avenger Part IV in 2002, with director Lloyd Kaufman in attendance for the latter film, and Scream 4 in 2011.

== 2001 ==
The festival took place between October 26 and October 28, 2001, at the Columbus Theater in Providence, Rhode Island. It selected a total of 14 films including one non-competition entry.

Feature competition

- Cradle of Fear (Alex Chandon, United Kingdom)
- Terror Tract (Clint Hutchinson and Lance W. Dreesen, United States) – Best Feature

Non–competition features

- The Phantom of the Opera (Rupert Julian, 1925)

Shorts

- Dead In America (Lawrence Klein, United States)
- Digging Ashley (Todd Cobery, United States) – Best Short
- The Fragile Skin (John Carr, United Kingdom)
- Teacher of the Year (Brian Adler, United States)
- Thou Shalt Not Kill (Yuk Ting Chan, Hong Kong)
- Tomorrow's Bacon (Bryan Norton, United States) – H.P. Lovecraft Award
- Twitch (Daniel Giambruno, Australia)
- Vampire Hunter's Club (Donald F. Glut, United States)
- Veil (B. Mark Seabrooks, United States)

== 2002 ==
The festival took place between October 25 and October 27, 2002, at the Columbus Theater in Providence, Rhode Island. It selected a total of 23 films including 4 non-competition entries. The event drew record attendance for the historic theater which was then celebrating its 75th year in operation.

Feature competition

- Anacardium (Scott Thomas, United States)
- The Human BEEing (Tony Shea, United States)
- Tomorrow by Midnight (Rolfe Kanefsky, United States) – Best Feature; East Coast premiere.

Documentaries

- All the Love You Cannes! (Lloyd Kaufman, United States)

Non–competition features

- Nosferatu (F. W. Murnau, 1922)
- Robotrix (Jamie Luk Kim Ming, 1991)
- Riki-Oh: The Story of Ricky (Nam Nai Choi, 1991)
- Citizen Toxie (Lloyd Kaufman, 2000)

Shorts

- Abaddon (Pamela Theodotou, United States)
- Anna's Room (Patrick Boyton, United States)
- Copycat (Christian Davis, United States)
- Daughter (Eduardo Rodriguez, United States)
- Desert People (United States)
- A Final Wish (Ose Oyamendan, United States)
- First Night Shift (Hubert Cheng, United States)
- Little Ricky (Michael Condro, United States)
- Marcilla (Jenelle Troxell, United States)
- Monkey Trap (Greg Nunes, United Kingdom)
- Off (Tyler Polhemus, United States) – (tie) Best Short
- Separation Anxiety (Guido Santi, United States)
- Surface Calm (Mike Miley, United States)
- The Snowman (Rene Dupre and Jim Lindstedt, United States)
- The Terror of the Invisible Man (Adam Roffman and Wayne Kimball, United States)
- Timmy's Wish (Patrick Cannon, United States) – (tie) Best Short

== 2003 ==
The festival took place between October 23 and October 26, 2003, at the Columbus Theater in Providence, Rhode Island. It selected a total of 18 films including 4 non-competition entries.

Feature competition

- Blood of the Beast (Georg Koszulinski, United States) – Best Director
- The Curse of Welwitschia (Adalberto Fornario, Germany) – New England premiere.
- Flesh for the Beast (Terry West, United States)
- Ghost of the Needle (Brian Avenet-Bradley, United States) – Best Feature
- King of the Ants (Stuart Gordon, United States) – East Coast premiere.

Documentaries

- Ghost and Vampire Legends of Rhode Island (Scott Saracen and Maria Patsias, United States)

Non–competition features

- Der Golem (Carl Boese and Paul Wegener, 1920)
- Maniac (William Lustig, 1980)
- Zombi (Lucio Fulci, 1979)
- Best of the Fest
  - The Human BEEing (Tony Shea, United States) – 2002 entry
  - Little Ricky (Michael Condro, United States) – 2002 entry
  - Timmy's Wish (Patrick Cannon, United States) – 2002 Best Short
- Japanese Horror Film Showcase
  - Ichi the Killer (Takashi Miike, 2001)
  - Uzumaki (Higuchinsky, 2000)

Shorts

- Deja Vu (Nossah Kirt, United States)
- Einstein's Brain (Ben Sweeney, United States)
- Filthy (Andy Lalaino, United States) – (tie) Best Short
- Headhunter (Adam Alleca, United States) – Best Special Effects
- The Legend of Aerreus Kane (Lance Maurer, United States)
- Red's Breakfast Experience (Caleb Emerson, United States)
  - Red's Breakfast
  - Red's Breakfast 2: Dawn of the Red
  - Red's Breakfast 3: Die You Zombie Bastards!
- William Wilson (Nicholas Davis, United States) – (tie) Best Short

== 2004 ==
The festival took place between October 14 and October 17, 2004, at the Columbus Theater in Providence, Rhode Island. It received 243 official entries, and 12 non-competition films, from 5 countries and 14 U.S. states, of which 27 were selected.

Feature competition

- Freak Out (Christian James, United Kingdom) – (tie) Best Genre Cross Over
- Shelf Life (Mark Tuit, Canada)

Documentaries

- The Vampire Hunters (Tim Hopewell, United Kingdom) – U.S. premiere

Non–competition features

- Tales of the Uncanny (Richard Oswald, 1919)
- Brief Lessons in the History of Rhode Island (Anthony Penta, United States)
  - Lesson 1: The Pirate Queen
  - Lesson 2: The Werewolf of Pawtucket
- Japanese Horror Film Showcase
  - Alive (Ryuhei Kitamura, 2002)
  - Eko Eko Azarak: Wizard of Darkness (Shimako Sato, 1995)
  - The Strange Killers (Shunsuke Yamamoto, 2002) – 2004 Viola M. Marshall Audience Choice Award

Shorts

- A Reasonable Hypothesis (Jack Ferry, United States)
- Art of the Dead (Brian Purviance, United States)
- The Crypt Club (Miguel Gallego, Canada) – (tie) Best Short
- Cube Zero (Ernie Barbarash, United States) – Best Visual Effects
- Dead & Breakfast (Matthew Leutwyler, United States) – Best Feature
- Detained (Jason Tammemagi, Ireland)
- Disfrasada (Mauro Rubeo, Italy)
- Enter...Zombie King (Stacey Case, Canada)
- Graveyard Alive (Elza Kephart, Canada) – (tie) Best Genre Cross Over
- Hokus Fokus (Brian Edgens, United States)
- The Last Horror Movie (Julian Richards, United Kingdom) – Best Director
- London Voodoo (Robert Pratten, United Kingdom)
- The People (Michael Noonan, Australia)
- Ring of Blood (Kenny Barrickman, United States)
- Un–Real (Paul Natale, United States)
- Thanatos Road (Edward Kishel, United States)
- There's Something Out There (Brian Pulido, United States) – (tie) Best Short
- 3 a.m. (Stewart Hopewell, United States)
- Zymosis (Daniel-James Matrundola, Canada)

== 2005 ==
The festival took place between October 27 and October 30, 2005. It received over 120 submissions, of which 28 films were selected. The festival was held at multiple venues for the first time and included Cable Car Cinema, Columbus Theatre, and Providence Chamber of Commerce Theatre in Providence, and the Courthouse Center for the Arts in West Kingston, Rhode Island.

Feature competition

- All Cheerleaders Must Die (Lucky McKee and Chris Sivertson, United States)
- August Underground (Fred Vogel, United States) – Vanguard Award
- Cruel World (Kelsey T. Howard, United States) – Horror Excellence Award; East Coast premiere.
- Dark Remains (Brian Avenet-Bradley, United States) – Best Feature
- Day X (Jason Hack, United States) – Best Director
- The Experiment (Daniel Turner, United Kingdom)
- Hellbent (Paul Etheredge-Ouzts, United States) – Vanguard Award
- Izo (Takashi Miike, Japan)
- The Mangler Reborn (Matt Cunningham and Erik Gardner, United States)
- The Manson Family (Jim Van Bebber, United States)
- Shadow: Dead Riot (Derek Wan, United States)
- Zombie Honeymoon (David Gebroe, United States)

Non–competition features

- Henry: Portrait of a Serial Killer (John McNaughton, 1986)
- The Texas Chain Saw Massacre (Tobe Hooper, 1974)

Shorts

- Beaster (Vincent Morrone, United States)
- Blood Jacker
- Bloody Mary (J. Elizabeth Martin, United States)
- Facility 4 (Colter Freeman, United States)
- Gotham Cafe (Jack Edward Sawyers, United States)
- Home Delivery
- Means to an End (Paul Solet, United States) – Best Short
- Mom vs. The Undead (James Darling, United States)
- Nothing in the Dark (John Correll Jr., United States)
- Rats (David Brocca, United States)
- The Road Virus Heads North (David Brock, United States)
- School of the Dead (James Raymond, United States)
- Snow Day, Bloody Snow Day (Jessica Baxter and Faye Hoerauf, United States)
- The Tell Tale Heart (Raul Garcia, United States) – Best Animated
- Voices Within (Christopher Vallone, United States)
- We All Fall Down (Jake Kennedy, United States) – Best Special Effects
- The White Mice (Luke Taylor, United States)
- Zombie Movie (Michael J. Asquith, New Zealand)
- Black Cab Films Shorts
  - Human No More (Christopher Alan Broadstone, United States)
  - Marburg (Shannon Lark, United States)
  - Moondance (Will Bigham, United States)
  - My Skin! (Christopher Alan Broadstone, United States)

== 2006 ==
The festival took place between October 5 and October 8, 2006. It received over 150 submissions, from which 40 films were selected. The festival venues included Cable Car Theatre, Columbus Theatre, and URI Feinstein Campus in Providence, Rhode Island.

Feature competition

- Bone Sickness (Brian Paulin, United States) – Best Makeup FX
- Die You Zombie Bastards! (Caleb Emerson, United States) – Best New England
- The Entrance (Damon Vignale, Canada)
- The Lost (Chris Sivertson, United States)
- Ricky 6 (Peter Filardi, Canada/United States)
- Seepage (Richard Griffin, United States) – Best Genre Cross Over
- The Slaughter (Jay Lee, United States) – Best Feature
- Unrest (Jason Todd Ipson, United States)

Documentaries

- Horror Business (Christopher P. Garetano, United States)

Non–competition features

- Day of the Dead (George A. Romero, 1985)

Shorts

- All I Want For Christmas (Scott Goldberg, United States)
- The Beach (Matthew Harrington, United States)
- Bed Bugs (Sean Carley, Canada) – North American premiere
- Blood Son (Michael McGruther, United States)
- The Boarder (Susan Bell, United States)
- Breezehaven (Patrick Bosworth and Jamie Dufault, United States)
- Call of Cthulhu (Andrew Leman, United States)
- Camp Blood: The Musical (Tanner Barklow, Jefferson Craig and Thomas Hughes, United States) – Audience Award
- Can I Call You (Edward "Ed" Lyons, United States)
- The Day They Came Back (Scott Goldberg, United States) – Best New Director
- Eating Razors (Ron Decaro, United States)
- Eddie Loves You (Karl Holt, United Kingdom)
- The Eyes of Edward James (Rodrigo Gudino, Canada)
- Grace (Paul Solet, United States) – Best Short
- The Incredible Falling Apart Man (Kenneth Hurd, United States)
- It's Just a Dream (Luke Cote, United States)
- Legion: Word Made Flesh (Robert Sexton, United States)
- The Listening Dead (Phil Mucci, United States)
- Man of the Worm (Brad Eadie, United States)
- Midnight Screening (Annabel Osborne, Australia)
- The Need (Chris Young, United States)
- Nightmare (Scott Goldberg, United States)
- Oculus (Mike Flanagan, United States)
- Of Darkness (Gary E. Irvin, United States)
- Penny Dreadful (Bryan Norton, United States)
- The Pit and the Pendulum (Marc Lougee, Canada)
- Teddy Scares (William Vaughan, United States)
- The Terrorist Ate My Brain (Brett Young, United States)
- Unexpected Company (Justin Sulham, United States)
- The White Lie (Ron Decaro, United States)
- Witchwise (Joe Harris, United States)
- Zombie Prom (Vince Marcello, United States)

== 2007 ==
The festival took place between October 18 and October 21, 2007. It received over 175 submissions, of which 43 films were selected. The festival venues included the Bell Street Chapel Theatre, Brooklyn Coffee and Tea House, Cable Car Theatre, Columbus Theatre, Providence Public Library, and URI Feinstein Campus in Providence and the Narragansett Theatre in Narragansett, Rhode Island.

Feature competition

- Am I Evil (Richard Terrasi, United States) – Best New Director
- Apartment 1303 (Ataru Oikawa, Japan)
- Bacterium (Brett Piper, United States)
- Brain Dead (Kevin S. Tenney, United States) – Best Feature
- Chill (Serge Rodnunsky, United States)
- Cthulhu (Daniel Gildark, United States)
- Days of Darkness (Jake Kennedy, United States)
- Easter Bunny, Kill! Kill! (Chad Ferrin, United States)
- A Feast of Flesh (Mike Watt, United States)
- The Gateway Meat (Ron DeCaro, United States)
- Gay Bed & Breakfast of Terror (Jaymes Thompson, United States)
- Netherbeast Incorporated (Dean Ronalds, United States)
- August Underground's Penance (Fred Vogel, United States) – Best Makeup FX
- Pretty Dead Things (Richard Griffin, United States)
- The Terror Factor (Gary Medeiros, United States) – Best New England

Documentaries

- Kreating Karloff (Connor Timmis, United States)
- Vampira: The Movie (Kevin Sean Michaels, United States)

Shorts

- Anesthesia (Adam Kargman, United States)
- Bad Dreams (Fansu Njie, Sweden)
- Beanbag (Jim Mitchell, United Kingdom)
- By Appointment Only (John Faust, United States)
- Chickenfut (Harrison Witt, United States)
- The Demonology of Desire (Rodrigo Gudino, Canada) – Best Short
- Die Flugbegleiterin (The Stewardess) (Marcin Glowacki, Germany)
- The Door (Jeffrey Frame, United States)
- Family Portrait (Anthony Colliano, United States)
- Franklin (Michael Cimpher, United States)
- Gay Zombie (Michael Simon, United States)
- Gruesome (Greg Lamberson, United States)
- A Homecoming (Kelly Farrel, United States)
- Human Resources (Jonathan Vantulleken, United States)
- It's My Birthday (Shannon Lark, United States)
- Keeper of the Myth (Kevin Callies, United States)
- Mr. Bubbs (Todd Thompson, United States)
- Mr. Video (Alex Masterton, United Kingdom)
- Night of the Hell Hamsters (Paul Campion, New Zealand)
- Sinning Flesh, a Bedtime Story (Dave Borges, United States)
- Still Breathing (Yusaku Mizoguchi, United States)
- The Vial (Brad Rego, United States)
- Voodoo Bayou (Javier Gutierrez, Mexico)
- W.O.R.M. (Anthony Sumner, United States)
- A Writer's Moon (Alex Baptista, United States)
- ZombieWestern: It Came From The West (Tor Fruergaard, Netherlands)

== 2008 ==
The festival took place between October 23 and October 26, 2008. It received over 250 submissions, of which 47 films were selected. The festival venues included the Bell Street Chapel Theatre, Cable Car Theatre, Columbus Theatre, and Providence Public Library in Providence and the Narragansett Theatre in Narragansett, Rhode Island.

Feature competition

- Blackspot (Ben Hawker, New Zealand)
- Christian Vampires from Beyond Suburbia (Jacquie Schnabel, United States)
- Conjurer (Clint Hutchison, United States) – Directorial Discovery
- Epitaph (Jung Brothers, South Korea) – (tie) Best Feature
- Exte: Hair Extensions (Sion Sono, Japan)
- The Living and the Dead (Simon Rumley, United Kingdom)
- Nightlife (Tim Sanderson, United States)
- Sea of Dust (Scott Bunt, United States) – (tie) Best Feature; world premiere.
- Trailer Park of Terror (Steven Goldmann, United States)

Documentaries

- Spine Tingler! The William Castle Story (Jeffrey Schwarz, United States) – Best Documentary

Shorts

- Advantage (Sean Byrne, Australia)
- A Hood in the Woods (Michael Kennedy, Australia)
- AM 1200 (David Prior, United States) – Best Short
- aQua ad lavandum – in brevi (Florian Metzner, Germany)
- At Night (Max Landes, United States)
- Awakened (Dale Stewart, New Zealand)
- Bendito el fruto de tu vientre (Sara Seligman, Mexico)
- Breast Pump and Blender (Elizabeth Gorcey, United States)
- The Call of Cthulhu (Andrew Leman, United States)
- Cheerbleeders (Peter Podgursky, United States)
- The Curse of Micah Rood (Alec Asten, United States) – Best New England
- Dead West (Eli Joseph Sasich, United States)
- Death in Charge (Devi Snively, United States)
- Detour (K. Akeseh Tsakpo, United Kingdom)
- Eel Girl (Paul Campion, New Zealand) – Best Makeup FX
- Ergotism (Stefan Rochfort, New Zealand)
- The Facts in the Case of Mister Hollow (Rodrigo Gudino, Canada)
- Family Affair (Rafael de Leon Jr., United States)
- Fright Site (Bill Timoney, United States)
- Harvest Moon (Micah Ranum, United States)
- Hugo (Nicholas Verso, Australia)
- In Twilight's Shadow (T.M. Scorzafava, United States)
- Kirksdale (Ryan Spindell, United States) – Best Student Film
- Last Night (Ed Park, Australia)
- Mirror, Mirror (Valerie Champagne, United States)
- Next Floor (Denis Villeneuve, Canada)
- Pickman's Model (Gary Fierro, United States)
- Psycho Hillbilly Cabin Massacre (Robert Cosnahan, United States)
- Pumpkin Hell (Max Finneran, United States)
- Sebastian's Voodoo (Joaquin Baldwin, United States)
- Snip (Julien Zenier, France/Spain)
- Soulmates (Tom Flynn, United States)
- This Way Up (Adam Foulkes and Alan Smith, United Kingdom)
- Vanished Acres (Adam Bolt, United States)
- Víctor y la máquina (Victor and the Machine) (Carlos Talamanca, Spain)
- Voigtkampff (Tobias Suhm, Germany)
- Von Hasen und Schnitzeln (About Rabbits and Schnitzels) (Thorsten Wassermeyer, Germany)

== 2009 ==
The festival took place between October 22 and October 25, 2009. It received over 250 submissions, of which 37 films were selected. The festival venues included the Bell Street Chapel Theatre and Providence Public Library in Providence, Rhode Island.

Feature competition

- Bikini Girls on Ice (Geoff Klein, Canada)
- Circuit (Andrew Landauro, United States) – (tie) Best Feature
- Cornered! (Daniel Maze, United States) – (tie) First Place for Best Feature
- Dawning (Gregg Holtgrewe, United States) – (tie) Best Feature
- The Disappeared (Johnny Kevorkian, United Kingdom)

Documentaries

- Nightmares in Red, White and Blue (Andrew Monument, United States) – Best Documentary

Shorts

- The Babysitter (Kristen Gray, United States)
- Back to Life (Mike Salva, United States)
- Broom Ride to Salem (Amybeth Parravano, United States)
- Celeriac (John D. Reilly, United States)
- Corrections (Bob Franklin, Australia)
- Crooked Lane (Chase Bailey, United States) – Best New England
- Danse Macabre (Pedro Pires, Canada)
- The Devil's Wedding (Dan Cadan, United Kingdom)
- Excision (Richard Bates, United States)
- First Kill (Micah Ranum, United States)
- Happy Face (Franklin P. Laviola, United States) – Directorial Discovery
- Hector Corp (Gary Lee, United States)
- How My Dad Killed Dracula (Sky Soleil, United States)
- Il Diavolo (Andrea Lodovichetti, Italy)
- I'm Afraid I am Hitler (Ruchika Lalwani, United States)
- Last Tape (Sarah Frazier, Canada)
- Lazarus Taxon (Denis Rovira, Spain) – (tie) Best Short
- Maggots (Matt Giannini, United States)
- The Music of Erich Zann (Jared Skolnick, United States)
- No Junk Mail (Chris McHugh, Australia)
- Orla's Song (Eric Deacon, United Kingdom)
- The Peach Farm (The Veil) (Wendy Hoopes, United States)
- Roar (Adam Wimpenny, United Kingdom)
- Seance (Robin Kasparík, Czech Republic)
- Sinkhole (Eric Scherbarth, United States)
- Sucker (Troy Price, United States)
- The Taxidermist (Bert & Bertie, United Kingdom) – (tie) Best Short
- Thirsty (Andrew Kasch, United States)
- The Ugly File (Mark Steensland, United States)
- Void (Meredith Berg, United States)
- Werewolf Trouble (Charlie Anderson, United States) – Best Makeup FX
- Zombies & Cigarettes (Rafael Martinez and Iñaki San Roman, Spain)

== 2010 ==
The festival took place between October 21 and October 24, 2010. It received 347 submissions, of which 50 films were selected. The festival venues included the Barrington Public Library in Barrington, Jamestown Arts Center in Jamestown, and Bell Street Chapel Theatre and Veterans Memorial Auditorium in Providence, Rhode Island.

Feature competition

- Mørke Sjeler (Dark Souls) (César Ducasse and Mathieu Peteul, France/Norway) – First Place for Best Feature
- True Nature (Patrick Steele, United States) – (tie) Best Feature
- Within (Hanelle Culpepper, Philippines/United States)
- Zombie Dearest (David Kemker, Canada) – (tie) Best Feature

Documentaries

- Lizbeth: A Victorian Nightmare (Ric Rebello, United States) – Best New England

Non–competition features

- King Kong (Merian C. Cooper and Ernest B. Schoedsack, 1933)
- The Fall of the House of Usher (Roger Corman, 1960)
- The Pit and the Pendulum (Roger Corman, 1961)
- The Raven (Roger Corman, 1963)

Shorts

- The Absence (Alex DeMille, United States)
- Anglesey Road (Russell Owen, United Kingdom)
- A Pain Like This (Ian Fischer, United States)
- Beware of What You Wish For (Patricia Doyle, United Kingdom)
- Black Rose (David Ricci, Canada)
- The Bloodstone Diaries: Sleeper (Gerry Bruno, United States)
- Chloe and Attie (Scooter Corkle, Canada) – U.S. Premiere
- The Continuing and Lamentable Saga of The Suicide Brothers (Arran and Corran Brownlee, United Kingdom) – (tie) First Place for Best Short
- Death Row Diet (Mike Salva and Tom Snyder, United States)
- DemiUrge Emesis (Aurelio Voltaire, United States)
- Evil of the Vampires (Mark Morris, United Kingdom) – World premiere
- The Familiar (Kody Zimmermann, Canada)
- "Halloween" Was Already Taken (Nitzan Rotschild, United States)
- The Happiness Salesman (Krishnendu Majumdar, United Kingdom) – (tie) Best Short
- The Hollow Girl (Dave McCabe, Ireland)
- How I Survived The Zombie Apocalypse (Christian Cantamessa, United States)
- Just Desserts (Nigel Karikari, United States)
- Leap (Dan Gaud, Canada)
- Love Me Tender (Matthew Morgenthaler, United States)
- Maya (Ronald Johnson, United States)
- Meth (Michael Maney, United States) – (tie) First Place for Best Short
- Mister Green (Greg Pak, United States)
- Natural Selection (Brett Foraker, United Kingdom) – (tie) Best Short
- The Package (Oliver Waghorn, Australia)
- Project Panacea (Daniel Jourdan, Canada)
- Red Balloon (Damien Mace and Alexis Wajsbrot, United Kingdom) – Directorial Discovery
- Remember (Andrea Zamburlin, Italy)
- Remission (Greg Ivan Smith, United States)
- Re-Wire (David-James Fernandes, Canada)
- The Silver Key (Gary Fierro, United States)
- S.P.A.G.H.E.T.T.-1 (Adam Varney, United States)
- Spoiler (Ed Whitmore, United Kingdom)
- Sudden Death! (Adam Hall, United States)
- Tell Him Next Year (David Margolis, United Kingdom) – Best Makeup FX
- The Tell Tale Heart (Lynne Cohen, United States)
- The Tell-Tale Heart, Animated Horror Short (Michael Swertfager, United States) – Best Animation
- The 3rd Letter (Grzegorz Jonkajtys, United States)
- Tinglewood (Alexander von Hofmann, Australia)
- Tinkermen (Matthew Wade, United States)
- TUB (Bobby Miller, United States)

== 2011 ==
The festival took place between October 27 and October 30, 2011. It received 383 submissions, of which 42 films were selected. The festival venues included the Barrington Public Library in Barrington, Jamestown Arts Center in Jamestown, and Bell Street Chapel Theatre and Veterans Memorial Auditorium in Providence, Rhode Island.

Feature competition

- Absentia (Mike Flanagan, United States) – (tie) First Place for Best Feature
- Beg (Kevin MacDonald, United States) – (tie) Best Actor and Best Feature
- The Corridor (Evan Kelly, Canada) – (tie) Best Feature
- State of Emergency (Turner Clay, United States) – (tie) First Place for Best Feature
- The Whisperer in Darkness (Sean Branney, United States)

Documentaries

- Dracula: The Vampire and the Voivode (Michael Bayley Hughes, United Kingdom) – Best Documentary

Non–competition features

- Scream 4 (Wes Craven, 2011)

Shorts

- Alistair (Aaron Cartwright, Australia)
- Amok (Christoph Baumann, Germany)
- An Evening With My Comatose Mother (Jonathan Martin, United States) – Best Makeup FX
- Awfully Deep – (Daniel Florencio, Brazil/United Kingdom)
- Bad Moon Rising (Scott Hamilton, Australia)
- Cabine of the Dead (Vincent Templement, France) – (tie) First Place for Best Short
- The Curse of Yig (Paul von Stoetzel, United States)
- Dinner (Jason Shawn Alexander, United States)
- Doll Parts (Karen Lam, Canada)
- Enter the Dark (Todd Miro, United States)
- Hatch (Damian McCarthy, Ireland)
- Hawkins Hill (Sara Seligman, Mexico/United States)
- Hay Un Diablo (There is a Devil) (Brant Hansen, United States) – (tie) First Place for Best Short
- Hike (Jennifer Campbell, Canada)
- Impostor (Marc Masciandaro, United States) – (tie) Best Short
- Incubator (Jimmy Weber, United States) – (tie) Best Short
- I Rot (Josef J. Weber, Australia)
- Kitty Kitty (Michael Medaglia, United States)
- La Migala (The Bird Spider) (Jaime Dezcallar, Spain)
- Last Halloween (John Stewart Muller, United States)
- Last Seen on Dolores Street (Devi Snively, United States) – Directorial Discovery
- Le Miroir (Sébastien Rossignol, France)
- Nice Guys Finish Last (Kimberly McCullough, United States)
- Maquinas Infernales (Simon Pernollet, France) – (tie) Best Sci-Fi/Fantasy
- Ocho (Raul Cerezo, Spain)
- Paths of Hate (Damian Nenow, Poland) – Best Animation
- Patient Zero (Jacob Chase, United States)
- Payload (Stuart Willis, Australia) – (tie) Best Sci-Fi/Fantasy
- Quick Shop (Martin Binder, United States)
- The Tombs (Jerry LaMothe, United States)
- Tread Darkly (Kyle Laursen, United States)
- Victim (Matthew A. Brown, Germany)
- Waffle (Rafael De Leon Jr., United States)
- Worm (Ryan Vernava, United Kingdom)

== 2012 ==
The festival took place between October 25 and October 28, 2012. It received 461 submissions from 20 countries, of which 63 films were selected. The festival venues included Roger Williams University in Bristol, Jamestown Arts Center in Jamestown, Fort Adams State Park in Newport, and Bell Street Chapel Theatre, Providence Public Library, and URI Feinstein Campus in Providence, Rhode Island.

Feature competition

- 247°F (Levan Bakhia, Georgia)
- A Little Bit Zombie (Casey Walker, Canada)
- The Barrens (Darren Lynn Bousman, United States)
- Beyond the Grave (Davi de Oliveira Pinheiro, Brazil)
- Exhumed (Richard Griffin, United States) – First Place for Best Feature
- The Thing on the Doorstep (Tom Gliserman, United States) – H.P. Lovecraft Award
- Towers (Jet Wintzer, United States) – (tie) Best Feature
- Twisted (Chai Yee Wei, Malaysia/Singapore)
- Up There (Zam Salim, United Kingdom) – (tie) Best Feature

Documentaries

- Nightmare Factory (Donna Davies, Canada) – Best Documentary

Non–competition features

- From the Vault: RI Horror Film Festival Classics
  - Cabine of the Dead (Vincent Templement, France) – 2011 First Place for Best Short
  - Hatch (Damian McCarthy, Ireland) – 2011 entry
  - Hay Un Diablo (Brant Hansen, United States) – 2011 First Place for Best Short
  - Incubator (Jimmy Weber, United States) – 2011 Best Short
  - Kitty Kitty (Michael Medaglia, United States) – 2011 entry
  - Last Seen On Dolores Street (Devi Snively, United States) – 2011 entry
  - Vampyre Compendium (Matteo Bernardini, Italy) – 2011 Best Actress

Shorts

- Advantageous (Jennifer Phang, United States) – Best Science Fiction
- Apple! (Frank Morris, United Kingdom)
- Attack of the Brain Suckers (Sid Zanforlin, Canada)
- Cadaver (Jonah D. Ansell, United States)
- Chilly (Dylan Kohler, United States) – Filmmaker Discovery Award
- Cryo (Luke Doolan, Australia)
- Deathbed (Ryan Williams, United States)
- Eagle Walk (Rob Himebaugh, United States) – Best Makeup FX
- Emily (Benjamin Mathews, Australia)
- Exit (Daniel S. Zimbler, United Kingdom)
- Fallout (Derek Dubois, United States) – New England Discovery
- Foxes (Lorcan Finnegan, Ireland)
- Franky and The Ant (Billy Hayes, United States)
- The Glow (Bryan Ott, Thailand) – Best Fantasy
- Good Taste (Greg Hanson, United States)
- Grace (Chole Huber, United States)
- Gray Matter (James B. Cox, United States)
- Harmony (Pierre-Emmanuel Plassart, United States)
- Her Heart Still Beats (Christopher Di Nunzio, United States)
- The Hunter (Marieka Walsh, Australia)
- La Granja (Ignacio Lasierra, Spain) – Best Short
- La Réparation (Julien Boustani and Cecilia Ramos, France)
- LIFELESS #BeingKindaDeadSortaSucks (VP Boyle, United States)
- Modern Family (Kwang Bin Kim, South Korea)
- Muse (Yanna Kalcheva, United States)
- The Narrative of Victor Karloch (Kevin McTurk, United States)
- Nursery Crimes (L. Whyte, United Kingdom)
- The Other Side (Oli and Alex Santoro, United Kingdom)
- Overflowed (Joan Llabata, China/Spain)
- Plush (Ryan Denmark, United States)
- Quinkin (Michael Wannenmacher, Australia)
- The Reluctant Vampire (Michael Greischar, United States)
- Rotting Hill (James Cunningham, New Zealand)
- Shadow of the Unnamable (Sascha Alexander Renninger, Germany)
- She's Lost Control (Haritz Zubillaga, Spain) – (tie) First Place for Best Short
- Shhh (Freddy Chavez Olmos, Canada/Mexico)
- The Soul Never Sleeps (Chris Peters, United States) – Best Experimental Film
- The Stolen (Karen Lam, Canada)
- Transmission (Zak Hilditch, Australia)
- Trash Day (Mike Frazier, United States)
- Vadim (Peter Hengl, Austria) – (tie) First Place for Best Short
- Wonderland, A True Story (Dana Al Mojil, Kuwait)
- Worm (Bert & Bertie, United Kingdom)
