= Rhode Island International Horror Film Festival =

- Location: Providence, Rhode Island, U.S.
- Founded: 2000
- Hosted by: Rhode Island International Film Festival
- Website: http://www.film-festival.org/Horror_ri.php

The Rhode Island International Horror Film Festival is an annual film festival held in Providence, Rhode Island, which features a wide variety of horror, sci-fi, and thriller films, as well as documentaries, from the United States and around the world. Founded in 2000, as one of several "festival sidebars" of the Rhode Island International Film Festival, it is the largest and longest-running horror film festival in New England.

The festival is known for screening formerly lost and restored films, most often silent films with live accompaniment, at the historic Columbus Theatre. The German horror films Nosferatu (1922) and Unheimliche Geschichten (1919) premiered at the 2002 and 2004 festivals respectively. Several years later, the festival offered a special world premiere screening of Roger Corman's The Fall of the House of Usher (1960) which had been restored and in high definition. The event has also featured guest appearances by actors and filmmakers, book-signings from horror writers, art exhibitions, and the annual H.P. Lovecraft Walking Tour.

A number of films have made their U.S. or international premieres at the festival. In 2004 alone, six festival entries made their U.S. premiere and five made their world premiere. Other films have included: Dark Remains (2005), Day X (2005), Pretty Dead Things (2006), Sea of Dust (2008), Chloe and Attie (2009), and Sudden Death! (2010). In January 2006, the Rhode Island International Horror Film Festival was called one of the top horror film festivals in the United States by Rue Morgue. MovieMaker has described the festival as "one of New England’s premier cinema events". The 2012 Rhode Island International Horror Film Festival received 461 submissions from 20 countries of which 63 films were selected. That same year, Chris Hallock of Diabolique Magazine wrote that it had "quietly become one of the top horror film festivals in the world".

== History ==
The Rhode Island International Horror Film Festival was started by Shawn Drywa. It became the first of several annual "festival sidebars" hosted by the Rhode Island International Film Festival in 2000. Scott Lefebvre, an author and film critic, started as an attendee during this period and eventually became a juror for the festival.

The 2002 festival celebrated the 75th anniversary of Providence's historic Columbus Theatre and attracted record crowds to the venue. Rolfe Kanefsky's Tomorrow by Midnight made its East Coast premiere at the festival and won "Best Picture". The award for best short film was a tie between Patrick Cannon's Timmy's Wish and Tyler Polhemus's Off. A restored print of F.W. Murnau's Nosferatu (1922) was also screened at the event. Festival director Shawn Drywa presented the winners with a small statuette "a gold witch on a broom mounted on a pumpkin sprouting from a solid marble base". The awards ceremony also had a Halloween-themed fashion show as a fundraiser for the Women's Coalition Against Domestic Violence.

At the 2003 Rhode Island International Horror Film Festival the Avenet Images film Ghost of the Needle won the award for "Best Feature". The award for "Best Short" was a tie between Andy Lalaino's Filthy and Nicholas Davis' William Wilson. Headhunter, directed by Adam Alleca, won the "Best Special Effects" award and Georg Koszulinski won "Best Director" for his zombie film Blood of the Beast.

The 2004 Rhode Island International Horror Film Festival received 243 official entries, and 12 non-competition films, from 5 countries and 14 U.S. states. The festival selected 27 of these films to be shown at the Columbus Theatre. Six festival entries made their U.S. premiere and five made their world premiere. Among the films being shown was Tales of the Uncanny (1919), a five-part German horror film, with live musical accompaniment by Boston composer James Rohr. It was followed by Shelf Life and Freak Out (2004). The latter film would go on to win a number of festival awards. Other selected films included Dead & Breakfast, Graveyard Alive, The Last Horror Movie, London Voodoo, and There's Something Out There. Proceeds from the event went towards the Patricia Neal Scholarship Fund to help college students study film.

Ric Rebello, an independent filmmaker and instructor at Bristol Community College, took over as festival director in 2005. Hellbent, reportedly the first-ever gay slasher film, premiered at the 2005 Rhode Island International Horror Film Festival and won the "Vanguard Award". Jason Hack attended the festival, along with executive producers Julie Bounds and Robert Lambert, and was awarded "Best Director" for his film Day X which made its U.S. premiere at the festival.

Festival submissions rose dramatically from 150 in 2006 to 383 entries in 2011. The 2006 Rhode Island International Horror Film Festival was covered by three radio stations and four horror websites. Among the winning films were Grace by Paul Solet (Best Short), Die You Zombie Bastards! by Caleb Emerson (Best New England), Bone Sickness by Brian Paulin (Best Makeup FX), and Camp Blood: The Musical by Tanner Barklow, Jefferson Craig and Thomas Hughes (Audience Award). Bed Bugs was also one of the films selected by the festival. Special guests for the festival included Gary Howard Klar (Day of the Dead), Paul Kratka (Friday the 13th Part III), and The Atlantic Paranormal Society.

The 2007 Rhode Island International Horror Film Festival saw the New England premieres of two documentaries: the award-winning Kreating Karloff by Vatche Arabian and Vampira the Movie by Kevin Sean Michaels. Selected films for the 2007 festival included Chill, Cthulhu, and the comedy horror films The Gay Bed and Breakfast of Terror and Gay Zombie. The Terror Factor, a comedy slasher film directed by Garry Medeiros, was chosen out of 40 other entries to win the "Best of New England" award. Family Portrait, produced by Pittsburgh filmmakers Matt Bonacci and Anthony Colliano, were among the multiple horror shorts and zombie films shown that year.

At the 2008 Rhode Island International Horror Film Festival, 47 films were selected from over 250 submissions. Among these were Blackspot, a New Zealand horror film which had won an award at the RIIFF two months earlier, and Scott Bunt's surreal Sea of Dust then making its U.S. premiere. The latter film tied with the Jung Brothers' Epitaph for "Best Picture". The Providence Journal considered another New Zealand film, Paul Campion's Eel Girl, to be the stand out film of seven horror shorts shown at Bell Street Chapel and later won the "Best Short" category. The publication also reviewed Gary Fierro's Pickman's Model, based on the H.P. Lovecraft short story of the same name, Devi Snively's Death in Charge and Ryan Spindell's Kirksdale, with the latter two films receiving high praise. Other films at the festival were Christian Vampires from Suburbia, A Hood in the Woods, Trailer Park of Terror and Jeffrey Schwarz award-winning documentary Spine Tingler! The William Castle Story. Also at the event were co-directors Joe DiGiorgi and Anthony Salerno of Headline Studio, where they promoted Sion Sono's Exte: Hair Extensions, and author K. Patrick Malone.

The 2009 festival saw the world premieres of Crooked Lane, Happy Face, Broom Ride to Salem and Maggots; Crooked Lane, directed by Chase Bailey, went on to win the "Best New England Film" award while director Franklin P. Laviola's won the "Directorial Discovery" award for Happy Face.

The opening night of the 2010 Rhode Island International Horror Film Festival featured a special world premiere of Roger Corman's The Fall of the House of Usher (1960), recently restored version and in high definition, starring Vincent Price. Fifty films were selected out of 347 submissions with many making their international or U.S. premieres. These included two award-winning short films: Brett Foraker's Natural Selection, starring Simon Callow and James D'Arcy, which had won first prize for "Best Short" at the 2010 RIIFF, and Krishnendu Majumdar's The Happiness Salesman, starring Christopher Eccleston, which was named best narrative short at the RIIFF's Roving Eye Film Festival. Michael Swertfager's animated short The Tell-Tale Heart, a tribute to the popular short story by Edgar Allan Poe, won "Best Animation". In addition to the annual H.P. Lovecraft Walking Tour was a "Zombiethon Battle" presented by the Society for Creative Anachronism, which displayed heavy and light-armored combat, as well as a "Zombie Battle Royale" open to the public.

The 2011 Rhode Island International Horror Film Festival saw 383 entries from countries including Australia, Canada, Ireland, Germany, Italy, United Kingdom, and the United States. The festival selected 42 of these films which were shown from October 27–30, drawing a large audience despite severe weather and power outages. Among the festival selections were Absentia, An Evening With My Comatose Mother, Cabine of the Dead, Hatch, Paths of Hate, State of Emergency, and an exclusive screening of Wes Craven's Scream 4. The RIIHFF's "Behind the Camera Lens" featured actor William Forsythe, director Glenn Ciano, and producer Chad A. Verdi of the horror film Inkubus. The cast and crew from eight of the international entries attended the festival including director Kevin and Shanna MacDonald ("Beg"), Marc Masciandaro ("Imposter"), producer Augustin Fuentes and writer-director Devi Snively ("Last Seen on Delores Street"), Matteo Bernardini ("Vampyre Compendium"). The annual H.P. Lovecraft Walking Tour was also sold-out. The horror festival was named one of the "10 Best Halloween Events" in the state by the website GoLocalProv.com that same year.

In spite of the dangerous weather conditions posed by the approaching Hurricane Sandy, the 2012 Rhode Island International Horror Film Festival went ahead as scheduled. George T. Marshall, longtime executive director of the Rhode Island International Film Festival, was interviewed on WPRI-TV's The Rhode Show. A total of 461 submissions from 20 countries including Australia, Canada, Georgia, Germany, Ireland, New Zealand, and the United Kingdom were entered. Of these, 63 films were selected and shown at 6 different locations between October 25–28, 2012: Roger Williams University, URI Feinstein College's Paff Theatre, the Bell Street Chapel Theatre, the Jamestown Arts Center, Fort Adams State Park and the Providence Public Library.

The 2012 festival offered feature films Darren Lynn Bousman's The Barrens, starring Stephen Moyer and Mia Kirshner, Richard Griffin's Exhumed with Evalena Marie and Sarah Nicklin, and Casey Walker's A Little Bit Zombie, an award-winning comedy horror with Kristopher Turner, Crystal Lowe, and Shawn Roberts. The Canadian documentary Nightmare Factory, days after making its U.S. premiere at the Screamfest Horror Film Festival, which followed Hollywood special effects artists Greg Nicotero, Howard Berger and Robert Kurtzman, was also shown at the festival. The festival horror shorts included "Attack of the Brain Suckers" and "Cadaver", with Christopher Lloyd and Kathy Bates respectively, international short films Vadim from Austria, 247°F from Georgia, and Wonderland, A True Story from Kuwait, the latter film adapted from Lewis Carroll's Alice's Adventures in Wonderland and Through the Looking-Glass.

In attendance were the cast and crew from six of the international entries as well as writer-directors Richard Griffin ("Exhumed"), Derek Dubois ("Fallout"), Billy Hayes ("Franky and the Ant"), director Tom Gliserman and composer Will Severin ("The Thing on the Doorstep"), and Jet Wintzer ("Towers"). A special forum, "Behind the Camera Lens", was held at Roger Williams University's Mary Tefft White Cultural Center featuring Derek Dubois, special effects artist Ben Bornstein, and Steven Feinberg, executive director of the RI Film & Television Office. In addition to several special events held by the festival, the popular H.P. Lovecraft Walking Tour was sold out for the second year in a row.

== Official selections ==
=== 2012 selections ===
==== Feature competition ====
- 247°F (Levan Bakhia, Georgia)
- A Little Bit Zombie (Casey Walker, Canada)
- The Barrens (Darren Lynn Bousman, United States)
- Beyond the Grave (Davi de Oliveira Pinheiro, Brazil)
- Exhumed (Richard Griffin, United States) – First Place for Best Feature
- The Thing on the Doorstep (Tom Gliserman, United States) – H.P. Lovecraft Award
- Towers (Jet Wintzer, United States) – (tie) Best Feature
- Twisted (Chai Yee Wei, Malaysia/Singapore)
- Up There (Zam Salim, United Kingdom) – (tie) Best Feature

==== Documentaries ====
- Nightmare Factory (Donna Davies, Canada) – Best Documentary

==== Shorts ====
- Advantageous (Jennifer Phang, United States) – Best Science Fiction
- Apple! (Frank Morris, United Kingdom)
- Attack of the Brain Suckers (Sid Zanforlin, Canada)
- Cadaver (Jonah D. Ansell, United States)
- Chilly (Dylan Kohler, United States) – Filmmaker Discovery Award
- Cryo (Luke Doolan, Australia)
- Deathbed (Ryan Williams, United States)
- Eagle Walk (Rob Himebaugh, United States) – Best Makeup FX
- Emily (Benjamin Mathews, Australia)
- Exit (Daniel S. Zimbler, United Kingdom)
- Fallout (Derek Dubois, United States) – New England Discovery
- Foxes (Lorcan Finnegan, Ireland)
- Franky and The Ant (Billy Hayes, United States)
- The Glow (Bryan Ott, Thailand) – Best Fantasy
- Good Taste (Greg Hanson, United States)
- Grace (Chole Huber, United States)
- Gray Matter (James B. Cox, United States)
- Harmony (Pierre-Emmanuel Plassart, United States)
- Her Heart Still Beats (Christopher Di Nunzio, United States)
- The Hunter (Marieka Walsh, Australia)
- La Granja (Ignacio Lasierra, Spain) – Best Short
- La Réparation (Julien Boustani and Cecilia Ramos, France)
- LIFELESS #BeingKindaDeadSortaSucks (VP Boyle, United States)
- Modern Family (Kwang Bin Kim, South Korea)
- Muse (Yanna Kalcheva, United States)
- The Narrative of Victor Karloch (Kevin McTurk, United States)
- Nursery Crimes (L. Whyte, United Kingdom)
- The Other Side (Oli and Alex Santoro, United Kingdom)
- Overflowed (Joan Llabata, China/Spain)
- Plush (Ryan Denmark, United States)
- Quinkin (Michael Wannenmacher, Australia)
- The Reluctant Vampire (Michael Greischar, United States)
- Rotting Hill (James Cunningham, New Zealand)
- Shadow of the Unnamable (Sascha Alexander Renninger, Germany)
- She's Lost Control (Haritz Zubillaga, Spain) – (tie) First Place for Best Short
- Shhh (Freddy Chavez Olmos, Canada/Mexico)
- The Soul Never Sleeps (Chris Peters, United States) – Best Experimental Film
- The Stolen (Karen Lam, Canada)
- Transmission (Zak Hilditch, Australia)
- Trash Day (Mike Frazier, United States)
- Vadim (Peter Hengl, Austria) – (tie) First Place for Best Short
- Wonderland, A True Story (Dana Al Mojil, Kuwait)
- Worm (Bert & Bertie, United Kingdom)

== Awards ==
- Competition
  - Best Feature
  - Best Documentary
  - Best Short
  - Directorial Discovery
  - Best Actor
  - Best Actress
  - Best Makeup FX
  - Best Animation/Experimental
  - Best Sci-Fi
  - Best Fantasy
  - Best Genre Cross Over
  - Best New England Film
  - Best Student Film
  - Audience Award
- Other Sections
  - H.P. Lovecraft Award - The award is given for local cinematic achievement.

=== 2012 winners ===
- Best Documentary – Nightmare Factory (Donna Davies, Canada)
- Best Experimental Film – The Soul Never Sleeps (Chris Peters, US)
- Best Fantasy – The Glow (Bryan Ott, Thailand)
- Best Feature – (tie) Towers (Jet Wintzer, US) and Up There (Zam Salim, UK)
  - First Place – Exhumed (Richard Griffin, US)
- Best Science Fiction – Advantageous (Jennifer Phang, US)
- Best Short – La Granja (Ignacio Lasierra, Spain)
  - First Place – (tie) She's Lost Control (Haritz Zubillaga, Spain) and Vadim (Peter Hengl, Austria)
- Best Makeup FX – Eaglewalk (Rob Himebaugh, US)
- Filmmaker Discovery Award – Chilly (Dylan Kohler, US)
- H.P. Lovecraft Award – The Thing on the Doorstep (Tom Gliserman, US)
- New England Discovery – Fallout (Derek Dubois, US)

== H. P. Lovecraft Walking Tour ==
The H. P. Lovecraft Walking Tour is an annual walking tour, sometimes called a "ghost walk", held at the Rhode Island International Horror Film Festival in Providence, Rhode Island. It is regarded as one of the festival's longest-running and most popular attractions. The event was sold-out in 2011 and 2012, the latter being held in spite of Hurricane Sandy. Presented by the Rhode Island Historical Society, the tour is 90 minutes and visits the former haunts of fantasy-horror author Howard Phillips Lovecraft (1890-1937), including the present-day site of Lovecraft's former home (between Brown University and Rhode Island School of Design) and the landmarks mentioned in his novels such as the Benefit Street houses, the First Baptist Church and Prospect Terrace Park. At the conclusion of the tour, guests often have been invited to special screenings at the Providence's historic Columbus Theater, where Lovecraft himself was an avid moviegoer, to see films inspired by the author's stories.
