= The Pit and the Pendulum (disambiguation) =

"The Pit and the Pendulum" is a short story by Edgar Allan Poe.

The Pit and the Pendulum may also refer to:

- The Pit and the Pendulum (1913 film), a film by Alice Guy-Blaché
- The Pit and the Pendulum (1961 film), a film by Roger Corman
- The Pit and the Pendulum (1964 film), a film by Alexandre Astruc
- The Pit and the Pendulum (1991 film), a film by Stuart Gordon
- The Pit and the Pendulum, a short film by Marc Lougee shown at the 2006 Rhode Island International Horror Film Festival
  - The Pit and the Pendulum, a 2009 comic book adaptation of the film by Lougee and Susan Ma, published by TidalWave Productions
- The Pit and the Pendulum (2009 film), a film by David DeCoteau
- "The Pit and the Pendulum", a 2000 Radio Tales adaptation for National Public Radio
- The Pit and the Pendulum: A Co-operative Future for Work in the South Wales Valleys, a 2004 book by Molly Scott Cato

== See also ==
- The Pit and the Pendulums, a star in Super Mario 64
