= Ingrid Pitt =

Polish and British actress (1937–2010)

- Publicity photo from Where Eagles Dare (1968)
- Born: Ingrid Küttner or Ingoushka Petrov; 21 November 1937; Berlin, Germany
- Died: 23 November 2010 (aged 73); London, England
- Occupations: Actress, writer
- Years active: 1964–2010
- Known for: Countess Dracula; The House That Dripped Blood; The Vampire Lovers; The Wicker Man; Cruelty and the Beast
- Spouse(s): Laud Roland Pitt Jr. (divorced); George Pinches (1972–?; divorced) Tony Rudlin (m. 1999)
- Children: 1

Ingrid Pitt (born Ingrid Küttner; 21 November 1937 – 23 November 2010) was a Polish and British actress and writer. She was best known for her work in British horror cinema of the 1970s.

== Early life ==
Ingrid Küttner was born in Berlin to Berthold Ernst Edmund Küttner (3 March 1870, Potsdam - 16 July 1953, Berlin) and Käthe Schweinfurth (1902-1986) one of two daughters, to a German father of Russian descent and a mother of Polish Jewish descent.

During World War II, she and her mother were imprisoned in Stutthof concentration camp in Sztutowo, near Danzig, annexed to Nazi Germany (present-day Nowy Dwór County, Pomeranian Voivodeship, Poland) but escaped.

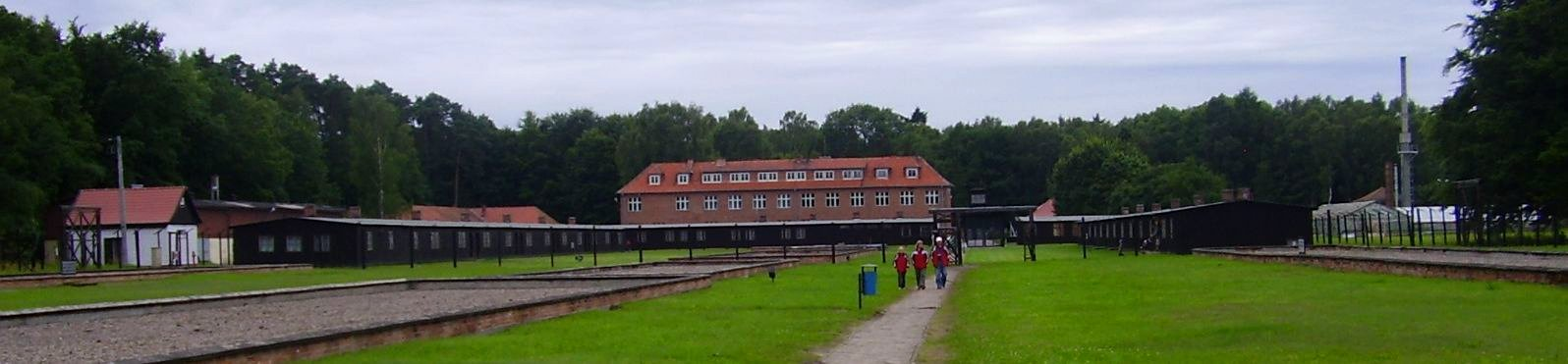
Nazi German Stutthof Concentration Camp, near Danzig (present-day Gdansk), Poland, where Holocaust survivor Ingrid Pitt and her family were detained for three years, and later escaped. It is now a memorial museum.

In West Berlin, in the 1950s, Ingoushka married an American soldier, Laud Roland Pitt Jr., and moved to California. After her marriage ended, she returned to Europe, where she took a small role in a film and adopted the stage name "Ingrid Pitt". She headed to Hollywood, where she worked as a waitress while trying to make a career in films.

== Acting career ==
In the early 1960s, Pitt was a member of the Berliner Ensemble in East Berlin, under the guidance of Bertolt Brecht's widow Helene Weigel. In 1965, she made her film debut in Doctor Zhivago, playing a minor role. In 1968, she co-starred in the low-budget science fiction film The Omegans, and in the same year, played British spy Heidi Schmidt in Where Eagles Dare opposite Richard Burton and Clint Eastwood.

Pitt appeared as Queen Galleia of Atlantis in The Time Monster, which was the fifth serial of the ninth season of Doctor Who, broadcast in six weekly parts, from 20 May through 24 June 1972. She returned to Doctor Who as Dr Solow in Warriors of the Deep, which was the first serial of the 21st season of the series, broadcast in four twice-weekly parts from 5 to 13 January 1984. Pitt also appears in the second broadcast episode of the short-lived cult ITC series The Zoo Gang, "Mindless Murder" (12 April 1974).

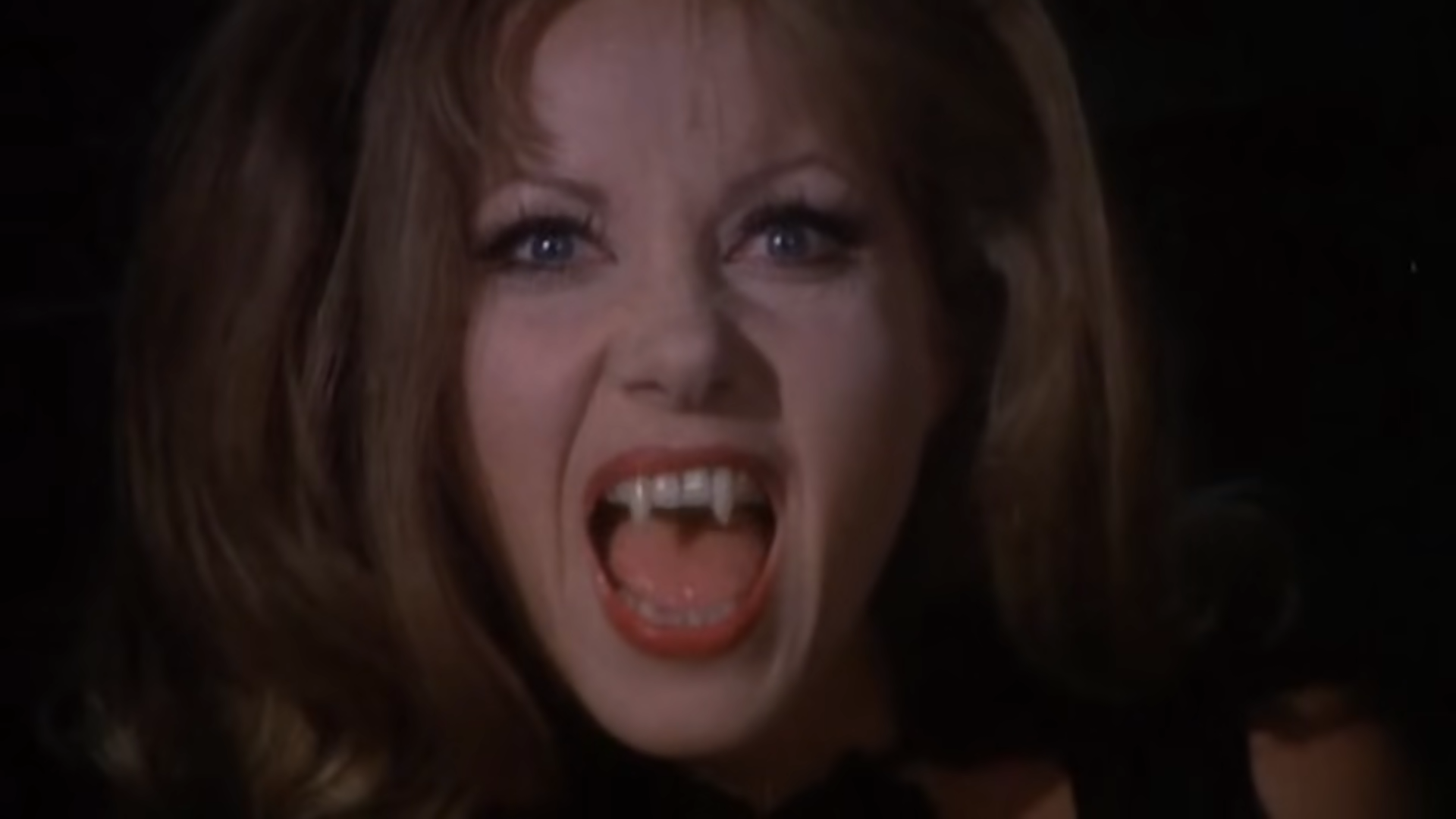
Pitt in The House That Dripped Blood

Her work with Hammer Film Productions elevated her to cult figure status. She starred as Carmilla/Mircalla in The Vampire Lovers (1970), based on Joseph Sheridan Le Fanu's novella Carmilla, and played the title role in Countess Dracula (1971), based on the legends about Countess Elizabeth Báthory. Pitt also appeared in the Amicus horror anthology film The House That Dripped Blood (1971) and had a small part in The Wicker Man (1973). It has been argued that "she never quite became the star she should have been."

In the mid-1970s, she appeared on the judging panel of the British ITV talent show New Faces.

During the 1980s, Pitt returned to mainstream films and television. In the 1981 BBC Playhouse production, Unity, her character, Fraulein Baum, who is denounced as a Jew by Unity Mitford (Lesley-Anne Down), was close to her real-life experience. Her popularity with horror film buffs kept her in demand for guest appearances at horror conventions and film festivals. Other films in which Pitt appeared outside the horror genre are: Who Dares Wins (1982) (or The Final Option), Wild Geese II (1985) and Hanna's War (1988). Generally cast as a villainess, her characters often died horribly at the end of the final reel. "Being the anti-hero is great – they are always roles you can get your teeth into."

At this time, the theatre world also beckoned. Pitt founded her own theatrical touring company and starred in successful stage productions of Alfred Hitchcock's 1954 classic, Dial M for Murder, Duty Free (or Don't Bother to Dress), and Woman of Straw. She also appeared in many television series in the United Kingdom and the United States; among them Ironside, Dundee and the Culhane and Smiley's People.

In 1998, Pitt narrated Cradle of Filth's album Cruelty and the Beast as the character Countess Elizabeth Báthory, whom she had portrayed in the film Countess Dracula.

In 2000, Pitt returned to the big screen in The Asylum, starring Colin Baker and Patrick Mower, and directed by John Stewart. In 2003, Pitt voiced the role of Lady Violator in Renga Media's production Dominator. The film was the United Kingdom's first computer-generated imagery animated film.

After a period of illness, Pitt returned to the screen for the Hammer Films-Mario Bava tribute Sea of Dust (2008).

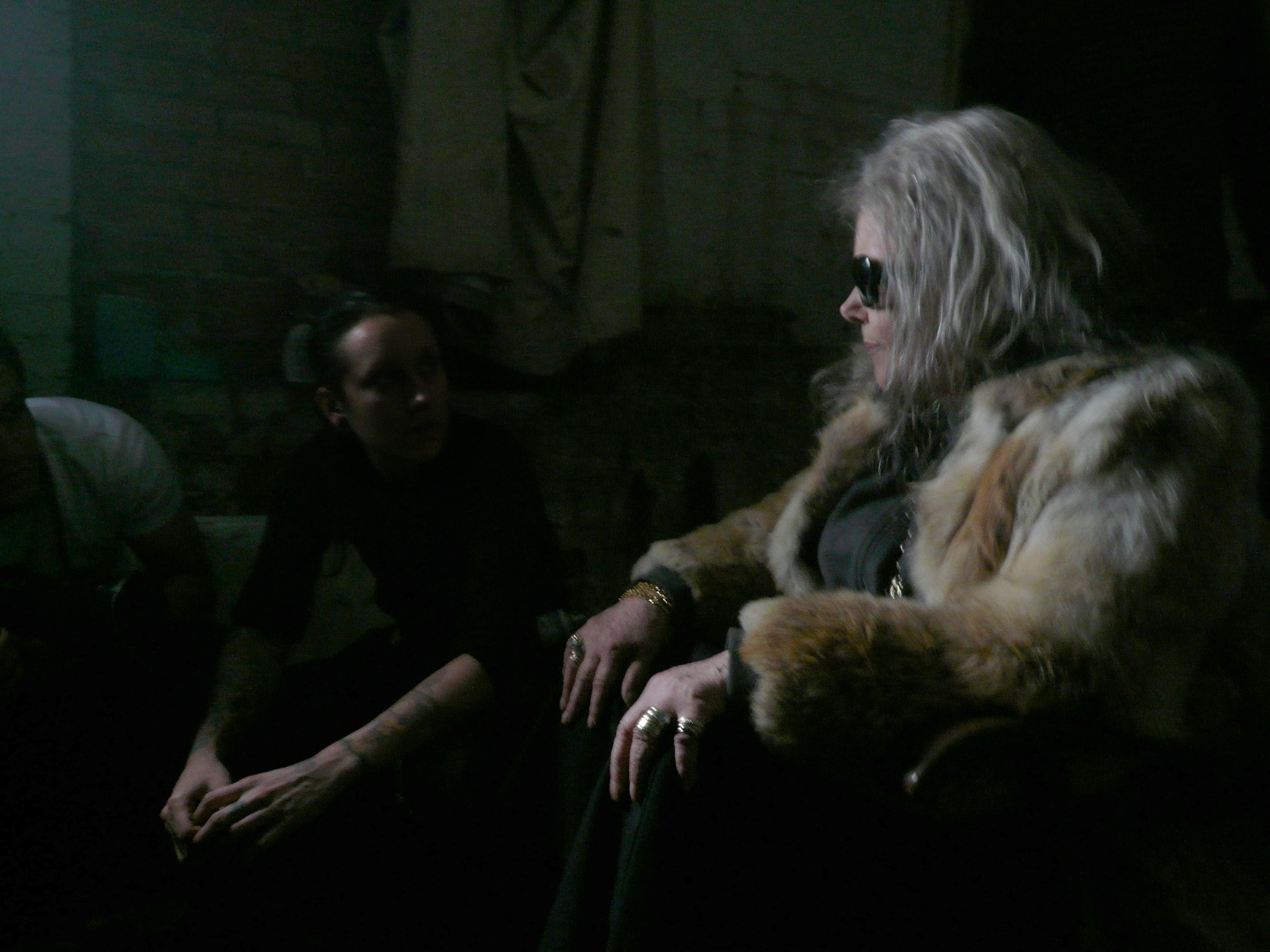
Ingrid Pitt (right) in Beyond the Rave

Pitt was also supposed to have a cameo role in Beyond the Rave (2008) as the unnamed mother of the drug dealer character Tooley played by Steve Sweeney. This horror serial, which marked the return of Hammer Films, was posted on the website MySpace, had Pitt's cameo scene filmed for episode 3, but it was omitted in the final cut. Despite this, Pitt was mistakenly listed in the credits for the episode as "Tooley's mum" as if she was still in it. The scene is included as an extra on the DVD.

== Writing career ==
Ingrid Pitt's first book, after a number of ill-fated tracts on the plight of Native Americans, was the 1980 novel, Cuckoo Run, a spy story about mistaken identity. "I took it to Cubby Broccoli. It was about a woman called Nina Dalton who is pursued across South America in the mistaken belief that she is a spy. Cubby said it was a female Bond. He was being very kind."

This was followed in 1984 by a novel of the Perón era in Argentina (The Perons), where she lived for a number of years: "Argentina was a wild frontier country ruled by a berserk military dictatorship at the time. It just suited my mood."

In 1984, Pitt and her husband Tony Rudlin were commissioned to script a Doctor Who adventure. The story, entitled The Macro Men, was one of a number of ideas submitted by the couple after she appeared in the season 21 story Warriors of the Deep (1984). The plot concerned events surrounding the Philadelphia Experiment—the urban legend about a U.S. Navy experiment during World War II to try to make the destroyer escort, USS Eldridge, invisible to radar. Pitt and Rudlin had read it in The Philadelphia Experiment – Project Invisibility (1979) by paranormal writer Charles Berlitz, grandson of the founder of the Berlitz language schools. It involved the Doctor (Colin Baker) and companion Peri (Nicola Bryant) arriving on board the ship in 1943 in the Philadelphia Naval Shipyard and becoming involved in a battle against microscopic humanoid creatures native to Earth, but previously unknown to humankind. The couple had several meetings with script editor Eric Saward and carried out numerous revisions, but the story progressed no further than the preparation of a draft first-episode script under the new title "The Macros". The story was released in June 2010 by Big Finish Productions as "The Macros" in their Doctor Who: The Lost Stories audios, five months before Pitt's death.

In 1999, her autobiography, Life's a Scream (Heinemann) was published, and she was short-listed for the Talkies Awards for her own reading of extracts from the audiobook, I Hate Being Second.

The autobiography detailed the harrowing experiences of her early life—in a Nazi concentration camp, her search through Europe in Red Cross refugee camps for her father, and her escape from East Berlin, one step ahead of the Volkspolizei. "I always had a big mouth and used to go on about the political schooling interrupting my quest for thespian glory. I used to think like that. Not good in a police state."

The Ingrid Pitt Bedside Companion for Ghosthunters (2003) was Pitt's tenth book. It was preceded by The Ingrid Pitt Bedside Companion for Vampire Lovers (1998) and The Ingrid Pitt Book of Murder, Torture & Depravity (2000).

Pitt's credentials for writing about ghosts spring from a time when she lived with a tribe of Indians in Colorado. Sitting with her baby daughter, Steffanie, by a log fire, she was sure that she could see the face of her father smiling at her in the flames. "I told one of the others and he went all Hollywood Injun on me and said something like 'Heap good medicine'. I guess he was taking the mickey."

Other writing projects include a different look at Hammer Films entitled The Hammer Xperience. She also wrote a story under the pen name, Dracula Smith, which was illustrated within the fan club magazine.

Pitt wrote regular columns for various magazines and periodicals, including Shivers, TV & Film Memorabilia and Motoring and Leisure. She also wrote a regular column, often about politics, on her official website, as well as a weekly column for the UK website Den of Geek. In 2008, she was added to the merchandising of Monster-Mania: The Magazine.

In 2011, Avalard Publishing acquired the rights to Cuckoo Run (1980) and several other previously unpublished titles, including Annul Domini: The Jesus Factor (March 2012), a speculative novel about what would have happened if Jesus had never made it to Jerusalem.

Pitt's original novel Dracula Who...? was released in a limited edition by Avalard in October 2012 alongside the script for the unproduced film version. Dracula Who...? had the return of Countess Dracula, a role Ingrid had played on screen for Hammer Films.

== Personal life ==
Pitt married three times: Laud Roland Pitt Jr, an American GI; George Pinches, a British film executive; and Tony Rudlin, a writer and racing car driver. Her daughter from her first marriage, Steffanie Pitt-Blake, is also an actress and she has one granddaughter, Sofia Blake.

She had step children from Tony’s first marriage. Pippa Rudlin Symons and Sarah Rudlin

She had a passion for World War II aircraft. After revealing this on a radio programme, she was invited by the museum at RAF Duxford to have a flight in a Lancaster bomber. She held a student's pilot licence and a black belt in karate.

== Death ==
Pitt died of congestive heart failure in a south London hospital on 23 November 2010, two days after her 73rd birthday.

== Legacy project ==
Seven months before she died, Pitt finished narration for Ingrid Pitt: Beyond the Forest (2011), an animated short film on her experience in the Holocaust, a project that had been in the works for five years. Character design and storyboards were created by two-time Academy Award-nominated filmmaker Bill Plympton. The film is directed by Kevin Sean Michaels; co-produced and co-written by Jud Newborn, Holocaust expert and author of "Sophie Scholl and the White Rose"; and drawn by 10-year-old animator, Perry Chen. There will be a feature-length documentary, also by Michaels, to follow.

== Filmography ==
Film
Year	Title	Role	Notes
1965	Doctor Zhivago		Uncredited
1965	Chimes at Midnight		Uncredited
1966	Un beso en el puerto	Dorothy	
1966	Sound of Horror	Sofia Minelli	
1966	A Funny Thing Happened on the Way to the Forum	Courtesan	Uncredited
1968	Where Eagles Dare	Heidi	
1968	The Omegans	Linda	
1970	The Vampire Lovers	Marcilla / Carmilla / Mircalla Karnstein	
1971	Countess Dracula	Countess Elisabeth Nádasdy	
1971	The House That Dripped Blood	Carla Lind	(segment: "The Cloak")
1972	Nobody Ordered Love	Alice Allison	Lost film
1973	The Wicker Man	Librarian	
1982	Who Dares Wins	Helga	
1983	Octopussy	Gallery Mistress	Voice; uncredited
1985	Wild Geese II	Hooker	
1985	Underworld	Pepperdine	
1986	Parker	Widow	
1988	Hanna's War	Margit	
2000	Green Fingers	Mrs. Bowen	Short film
2000	The Asylum	Isobella	
2003	Dominator	Lady Violator	Voice
2006	Minotaur	The Sybil	
2008	Beyond the Rave	Tooley's Mum	Direct-to-video
2008	Sea of Dust	Anna	

Television
Year	Title	Role	Notes
1967	Dundee and the Culhane	Tallie Montreaux	Episode: "The 1000 Feet Deep Brief"
1967	Ironside	Irene Novas	Episode: "The Fourteenth Runner"
1972	Jason King	Nadine	Episode "Nadine"
1972, 1984	Doctor Who	Galleia/Dr. Solow	Serials: The Time Monster, Warriors of the Deep
1973	The Adventurer	Elayna	Episode: "Double Exposure"
1974	The Zoo Gang	Lyn Martin	Episode: "Mindless Murder"
1975	Thriller	Ilse	Episode: "Where the Action Is"
1981	BBC2 Playhouse	Fraulein Baum	Episode: "Unity"
1981	Artemis 81	Hitchcock Blonde	Television film
1982	Smiley's People	Elvira	Miniseries, 2 episodes
1983	The Comedy of Errors	Courtesan	Television film
1984	The House	Countess Von Eisen	Television film
1987	Bulman	Laura	Episode: "Chicken of the Baskervilles"

Writer
Year	Title	Notes
2011	Ingrid Pitt: Beyond the Forest	Short film; released in 2011, (final film role)

== Bibliography (partial) ==
- Cuckoo Run (1980)
- Bertie the Bus (1981: ISBN 9780950290744)
- The Perons (1984)
- Eva's Spell (1985)
- Katarina (1986)
- The Ingrid Pitt Bedside Companion for Vampire Lovers (1998)
- Life's a Scream: The Autobiography of Ingrid Pitt (1999)
- The Ingrid Pitt Bedside Companion for Ghosthunters (1999)
- The Ingrid Pitt Book of Murder, Torture and Depravity (2000)
- Darkness Before Dawn (the American, extended version of Life's A Scream) (2004)
- Annul Domini: The Jesus Factor (2012)
- Dracula Who...? (2012)

== Discography ==
Cradle of Filth

- Cruelty and the Beast (1998) (Narration on "The Twisted Nails of Faith" and "Bathory Aria".)
