= Sea of Dust =

Sea of Dust may refer to:

- Sea of Dust (film), a 2008 horror film starring Ingrid Pitt
- Sea of Dust (Greyhawk), a fictional desert in the World of Greyhawk campaign setting for the Dungeons & Dragons role-playing game
