= Desmond Cullum-Jones =

British actor (1924–2002)

- Born: Desmond Alexander Cullum-Jones; 1 December 1924; Seattle, Washington, USA
- Died: 6 June 2002 (aged 77); Poole, Dorset, England.

Desmond Alexander Cullum-Jones (1 December 1924 – 6 June 2002) was an American born, British actor known for films such as Impact (1963), Dad's Army (1971), Freak Out (2004) and Wednesday's Child (1962). On the TV show Dad's Army he played Private Desmond.

Cullum-Jones also appeared in TV shows such as Suspense, Sherlock Holmes, Dixon of Dock Green, Softly, Softly, Crime of Passion, Nancy Astor, Father Dear Father, Z-Cars, The Good Life and The Bill. He also appeared in the Doctor Who story "The War Machines". In 1977, Cullum-Jones went into semi-retirement only playing small onscreen parts.
