= The Terror Factor =

- Directed by: Garry Medeiros
- Written by: Garry Medeiros
- Produced by: Mario Pereira; John Sylvia
- Starring: Matthew G. Hill; Antonio Dias; Garry Medeiros; Nina Rusin; Christopher Reed; John Sylvia; Ligia Lopez; Maria Joanna Lopez; John Procaccini; Marc Manzone; Jen Cardoza; Dave Lepine
- Cinematography: Garry Medeiros
- Edited by: Garry Medeiros; John Sylvia; Matthew G. Hill
- Music by: Garry Medeiros
- Production company: Sai-Con Productions
- Distributed by: Brain Damage Films; Maxim Media International
- Release date: October 30, 2007
- Running time: 84 minutes
- Country: United States
- Language: English
- Budget: $2,000

The Terror Factor is a 2007 American independent comedy horror film written and directed by Garry Medeiros and starring Matthew G. Hill, Nina Rusin, and John Sylvia. It premiered on October 30, 2007, and was completed on a US$2,000 budget. The film was voted "Best of New England" at the 2007 Rhode Island International Horror Film Festival and was later screened at the 2008 Fright Night and Rock & Shock Film Festivals. In 2010, it was released on DVD by Maxim Media International.

The story follows Warren Wilcox (Matthew G. Hill), an escaped mental patient, who terrorizes a group of local teenagers who he finds partying in his childhood home. Wilcox's killing spree is interrupted by an aspiring serial killer (Antonio Dias), who takes advantage of the panic created by the escapee, and leads to an eventual showdown between the two.

== Plot summary ==
A young boy named Warren Wilcox stands over the body of his father, moments after stabbing him to death, and then pursues his mother with an axe. She locks herself in a room but Wilcox soon breaks through the door and kills her. He is subsequently institutionalized at a local mental hospital.

Thirty years later, on the anniversary of his parents murder, Wilcox escapes from the facility and heads for his childhood home in Dartmouth, Massachusetts. A local reporter, Fred Gordon, describes the escape from outside the Wilcox home and interviews Sheriff Bob Grady who imposes an 8 o'clock curfew on the town. As the interview ends, a man is seen turning off his television and pulling out a video cassette after taping the news segment. His room is adorned with swastikas and satanic imagery. The man walks across the room to a bedroom window and uses a camera to watch the girl across the street kissing her boyfriend.

Later that day, Chez is lying in bed thinking about the recent breakup with his girlfriend Cathy. Chez's friend Ringo attempts to console him and invites Chez to go along on a double date. Ringo explains that his new girlfriend Jodi wants to defy curfew by spending the night at "the old Wilcox house". Chez declines the offer but is unwilling to be "cooped up inside all night" and decides to ignore the curfew as well. He has a brief conversation with his younger sister Lauren who is waiting for her boyfriend Mike to return from work. Neither appear to take the threat of Wilcox's escape seriously and they sarcastically say their "goodbyes" to each other. As he prepares to leave the house Chez is approached by his neighbor Matt, the man who had earlier been spying on Lauren and Mike, and a brief argument ensues with Chez warning Matt to leave his sister alone before driving away. Meanwhile Ringo and Jodi, along with Reanna and Dave, arrive at the abandoned Wilcox residence. It is here that their night of terror begins.

== Cast ==
- Matthew G. Hill as Warren Wilcox, a monstrous thug with a childlike mind and a disturbing secret.
- Antonio Dias as Matt, a deviant "homegrown" serial killer who lives across the street from Chez and Lauren.
- Garry Medeiros as Chez
- Nina Rusin as Lauren
- Christopher Reed as Mike
- John Sylvia as Ringo
- Ligia Lopez as Jodi
- Maria Joanna Lopez as Reanna
- John Procaccini as Dave
- Marc Manzone as Sheriff Bob Grady
- Dave Lepine as Mr. Wilcox
- Jennifer Cardoza as Mrs. Wilcox

== Production ==
The Terror Factor was the feature film debut of writer-director Garry Medeiros. A 1994 graduate of Dartmouth High School, he was a largely self-taught filmmaker. Medeiros had made a number of amateur shorts before starting his first major film project. The film's production started in August 2000 and took seven years to complete. Filming was delayed several times due to actors dropping out of the project requiring key scenes to be reshot or cut from the film altogether, and numerous script rewrites. The abrupt departure of John Procaccini, the film's original star, ultimately led to Medeiros's minor character becoming the main protagonist. The director was also forced to take a two-year hiatus from filming for family reasons. Medeiros described his experience on Sai-Con Productions official Facebook page:

Back in 2000 I started shooting, 'The Terror Factor'. The idea was simple... No money, non-actors (Family, friends, ect [sic]...), so I decided to make an 80s style slasher flick. The bad acting would just add to the cheesy, campy feel of the film. Well, right off the start it was clear that my first "stab" at a feature wasn't going to be an easy one. Actors would show for a day or 2 then never return and the actors who did stick around, god bless their souls, would show up with a brand new hair cut... So we had reshoots and reshoots, script changes, big deal. The important thing is we got it done and I couldn't thank the ones who stuck through it the whole way through enough.

The film was shot on a $2,000 budget with an all volunteer crew numbering around 12 people. Medeiros handled many roles including cinematography, lighting, musical score, set design, and other duties. He also worked on editing with cast members Matthew Hill and John Sylvia, and special effects with Sylvia and his brother Richie Medeiros. Another brother, musician David Medeiros, served as assistant cameraman and had a cameo role along with his Reflections of Mortality bandmates. The band provided some of the original soundtrack. The Terror Factor was shot at various locations in Dartmouth, New Bedford, and Wareham, Massachusetts. The final scene was shot at Cape Cod Express, a Wareham trucking company, where Garry Medeiros was then employed.

Prior to the film's release, Medeiros co-hosted a Sunday night public access television series, The Father Galen Indie Horror Mass, with Terror Factor star Matthew Hill. The show featured a tongue-in-cheek parody of religious figures on public access in the form of Catholic priest Father Galen, played by Hill, paired with a puppet who served as comic relief for the duo. The Father Galen Indie Horror Mass showcased independent horror films typically unavailable in mainstream U.S. rental outlets.

== Reception ==
The Terror Factor premiered at the 2007 Rhode Island International Horror Film Festival on October 30, 2007 and beat out 40 other local films to win the "Best of New England" award. The film made its theatrical debut at the Holy Ghost Grounds in South Dartmouth on November 2, 2007, and was screened at the Fright Night and Rock & Shock Film Festivals the following year. The Terror Factor was eventually picked up by Maxim Media International and released on DVD in 2010.

Alex DiVincenzo of Horror 101.com gave the film a favorable review, noting the homage to Halloween and Friday the 13th, and complimenting Medeiros' skillful imitation of John Carpenter's directing style, earning a score of 61 out of 101. Film critic Hayes Hudson called the film "a lot of fun", with a unique twist on a familiar horror film storyline, and wrote that Medeiros' cinematography was "very well done and the overall look to the picture is perfect". He did, however, criticize the overuse of profanity, feeling that it took away from the cast's performance, and claimed that "[he'd never] heard the F-bomb dropped so much in a single movie ... not even Casino".

=== Awards and nominations ===
Award	Subject	Nominee	Result
Rhode Island International Horror Film Festival	Best New England	The Terror Factor	Won
