= Pretty Bloody: The Women of Horror =

- Directed by: Donna D. Davies
- Theme music composer: Asif Illyas; Shehab Illyas
- Country of origin: Canada
- Original language: English

Production
- Producer: Kimberlee McTaggart
- Cinematography: Robert Zimmerman
- Editor: Sarah Byrne
- Production company: Sorcery Films

Original release
- Network: Space
- Release: February 25, 2009

Pretty Bloody: The Women of Horror is a television documentary film that premiered on the Canadian cable network Space on February 25, 2009.

The hour-long documentary examines the experiences, motivations and impact of the increasing number of women engaged in horror fiction, with producers Donna Davies and Kimberlee McTaggart of Canada's Sorcery Films interviewing actresses, film directors, writers, critics and academics. The documentary was filmed in Toronto, Ontario, Canada; and in Los Angeles, California and New York City, New York in the United States.

== Interview subjects include ==
- Cerina Vincent
- Elza Kephart
- Tanya Huff
- Mary Lambert
- Heidi Honeycutt
- Maitland McDonagh
- Debbie Rochon
- Katt Shea
- Brinke Stevens
- Karen Walton
- Jovanka Vuckovic
