= Slaxx =

2020 horror comedy film

- Promotional release poster
- Directed by: Elza Kephart
- Written by: Patricia Gomez; Elza Kephart
- Produced by: Patricia Gomez; Anne-Marie Gélinas; Shaked Berenson
- Starring: Romane Denis; Brett Donahue; Sehar Bhojani; Stephen Bogaert
- Cinematography: Steve Asselin
- Edited by: Mirenda Ouellet
- Music by: Delphine Measroch
- Production companies: EMA Films; Entertainment Squad
- Distributed by: The Horror Collective
- Release dates: August 23, 2020 (Fantasia); September 11, 2020 (Canada)
- Running time: 77 minutes
- Country: Canada
- Language: English

Slaxx is a 2020 Canadian horror comedy film directed by Elza Kephart, who co-wrote the film with Patricia Gomez. The film is produced by Gomez with Anne-Marie Gélinas, and stars Romane Denis as a cashier in a clothing store who, with her fellow employees, is terrorized by a possessed pair of jeans.

Slaxx premiered digitally as part of the Fantasia International Film Festival in August 2020. The film was set to be released theatrically in Canada on August 26, 2020. Shudder acquired the film's streaming rights for a 2021 debut.

== Plot ==
Idealistic teenager Libby McClean arrives at trendy clothing store Canadian Cotton Clothiers for her first day of work. In addition to store manager Craig, Libby meets self-absorbed and disgruntled employees including Shruti, Hunter, Jemma, and Lord. Company founder Harold Landsgrove briefly visits to give a spirited speech to employees preparing for the highly anticipated launch of Super Shapers, designer jeans capable of conforming to any body type.

Jemma steals a pair of the jeans from a storeroom. The jeans constrict around Jemma’s waist until she is torn in half. Craig sends Hunter to look for Jemma. Hunter finds the jeans and becomes entranced. Hunter tries putting on the pants, but they twist until she falls and impales her head on a coat hook. Craig sends Libby to look for Jemma and Hunter. Libby finds Jemma’s mangled body and alerts Craig. Worried that police or media could complicate his chance at a promotion, Craig convinces Libby to keep Jemma’s death quiet since they are on overnight lockdown until the new line launches anyway. Lord finds the jeans. The zipper severs several of Lord’s body parts. The waist then forms a mouth that bites Lord to death. Libby again asks to call the cops after finding Lord as a box of body parts. Craig knocks Libby unconscious to stop her.

Fashion blogger and social media influencer Peyton Jewels arrives with a small crew to record a sneak preview of the jeans. The jeans strangle Peyton on camera before going on a rampage that kills everyone else in the store except Shruti. Craig realizes what is happening when he sees the jeans lapping up blood on the floor. Craig tries warning conceited PR person Barb Lubotski, but instead allows the jeans to kill Barb after she insults him. Libby recovers. Libby finds Peyton’s dropped camera, which contains footage of the killing spree. Libby shows the alarming video to Shruti. Libby sees that the jeans could have killed Shruti, but didn’t because Shruti was singing a Bollywood song. Libby and Shruti take the camera to Craig, who continues trying to downplay that they are dealing with killer jeans.

The jeans take over a mannequin that gives the pants a human form. Recognizing a connection to India, Libby asks Shruti to speak to the jeans in Hindi. By writing in blood on a wall, the jeans reveal they are possessed by Keerat, a 13-year-old child laborer who was killed by a thresher in the experimental Indian cotton field used to source Super Shapers. Libby and Shruti angrily confront Craig about Keerat’s revelation. Craig admits that Canadian Cotton Clothier’s image of being organic and humanitarian is a lie, and that the retailer actually exploits sweatshops and GMOs. Libby and Shruti bargain to publicly expose Keerat’s story in exchange for an end to the murders. Unwilling to let his regional manager promotion to go to ruin if the company is exposed for unethical conducts, Craig interrupts by blasting the pants with a fire extinguisher. Libby and Shruti find more pairs of possessed jeans eating dead bodies.

A crazed Craig stabs Shruti to get the camera containing the damaging footage, but finds its memory card missing. Craig chokes out Libby while looking for the memory card. A horde of jeans comes for Craig and devours him down into a skeleton. Libby recovers in time to see that the store’s automated lockdown is about to end. Libby tries barring the doors as they unlock, but anxious customers trample Libby to death as they storm the store. The jeans go on another massive killing spree. The memory card is seen in Libby’s hand.

== Cast ==
- Romane Denis as Libby McClean
- Brett Donahue as Craig
- Sehar Bhojani as Shruti
- Stephen Bogaert as Harold Lansgrove
- Kenny Wong as Lord
- Tianna Nori as Barb Lubotski
- Hanneke Talbot as Jemma
- Erica Anderson as Peyton Jewels

== Reception ==
On review aggregator website Rotten Tomatoes, Slaxx has an approval rating of 96% based on 69 reviews, with an average rating of 6.8/10. The site's critical consensus reads, "A slim-cut slice of bizarre horror, Slaxx effectively balances quirk with gore -- and has the good sense to get out before its oddball premise starts showing its seams." Metacritic, which uses a weighted average, assigned the film a score of 64 out of 100, based on 5 critics, indicating "generally favorable" reviews.

Peter Bradshaw of The Guardian awarded it a score of three out of five stars, calling it "An entertaining skewering of the hidden global politics in retail trendiness." David Gelmini of Dread Central awarded it three point five out of five stars, calling it one of the most memorable films to have been screened at the London FrightFest Film Festival in 2020. Tomris Laffly of RogerEbert.com awarded it two point five out of four stars, saying that viewers would enjoy Slaxx once they looked past the quirks.
