= Dominator (comics) =

British comic character and its adaptations

- Promotional film poster
- Directed by: Tony Luke
- Screenplay by: Alan Grant
- Based on: Dominator by: Tony Luke; and Alan Grant
- Produced by: Jim Brathwaite
- Starring: Dani Filth; Doug Bradley; Ingrid Pitt; Alex Cox
- Edited by: Doug Bradley; Tony Luke
- Music by: Pete Haycock
- Production company: Renga Studios
- Distributed by: Salvation Films
- Release dates: 21 May 2003 (Cannes); 20 September 2003 (Brighton)
- Running time: 74 minutes
- Country: United Kingdom
- Language: English
- Budget: £20,000

Dominator is a British comic character created by Tony Luke. The character debuted in the British heavy metal music magazine Metal Hammer in 1988, before being serialised in the Japanese seinen manga magazine Monthly Afternoon in 1993. It was adapted into a 2003 computer-generated animated feature film directed by Luke. The story chronicles the ongoing adventures of the eponymous "Demon God of Rock & Roll" in many different forms.

It holds the distinction for being the first manga made by a British artist, and the first British computer-generated animated film, albeit made on a series of relatively simple programs on Mac computers, hence the overly primitive animation and unrefined graphics.

== Film synopsis ==
Lord Desecrator has defeated Lucifer as the ruler of Hell, but Desecrator's general, Dominator, has rebelled and stolen the Key to Hell to prevent Desecrator gaining control of the realm. On Earth, the daughters of an exorcist by the name of Dr. Payne accidentally summon Dominator to Earth by playing the forbidden Lost Chord. Dominator is soon followed by three of Lord Desecrator's soldiers; Decimator, Extricator, and his former lover, Lady Violator. Dominator must prevent Lord Desecrator coming to Earth at all costs, while battling the many demons that are emerging from the hole that has been torn between the two realms.

== Voice cast ==
- Dani Filth as Dominator
- Doug Bradley as Dr. Payne/Lord Desecrator
- Ingrid Pitt as Lady Violator
- Tara Harley as Tara Payne
- Liza Goddard as Fina Payne
- Sarn Synthetic as Molly Payne
- Marc Riley as Decimator
- Mark Radcliffe as Extricator
- Seera Backhouse as Hellkatt
- Alex Cox as Bishop
- Doug Devaney as Prime Minister
- Robert Rankin as Shagg/Narrator
- Billie Godfrey as Lendra Patel
- Mandy Gilholme as Judith

== Production ==
=== Origins and Metal Hammer (1988–1990) ===
Tony Luke came up with the ideas for Dominator while working as a caretaker in the East End of London after moving there in the late 1980s. The idea and design for the titular character was inspired by "kabuki dancers who had very long hair with masks". Originally slated to appear in the music magazine Kerrang!, Luke instead went to Metal Hammer magazine to serialise his comic after falling out with Kerrang!'s editor, where it ran for six months in 1988. Making up half-a-page, it featured black-and-white artwork, and plots that often involved the leading rock stars of the time. Luke moved back home to Brighton after its conclusion, in the meantime working with writer and long-time friend Alan Grant on various comics in 2000 AD and Judge Dredd Megazine, as well as a joint American-Japanese comic titled Psychonauts, illustrated by Motofumi Kobayashi and printed under Epic Comics.

In late 1990, Tundra Publishing had gained the rights to create a new comic adaptation of Dominator with Luke; nothing materialised from this, and the rights eventually expired.

=== Development under Kodansha (1991–1994) ===
In 1991, Tony Luke visited San Diego for a comic convention where he met with a number of publishers, including Japanese company Kodansha. After they showed interest in his work on Dominator, Kodansha offered Luke a contract to obtain the rights to the comic and serialise it in one of their manga magazines. Luke signed the contract to create twelve episodes in December 1992. Luke noted that Kodansha were actively searching for artists with unusual art styles when he approached them, saying that the "style I was doing things in at the time – which was cut-and-paste montage – they really liked that because they'd never seen anything like it. Almost every publisher we took it to in the [W]est said, 'No, this won't work. No-one will go for this style. No-one's interested.' One publisher in particular, who I won't mention by name, said, 'No, the Japanese will hate this.'"

Dominator was serialised in full colour in Kodansha's seinen manga magazine Monthly Afternoon from 24 July 1993, (Note: Debuted in the magazine's September 1993 issue, released on 24 July of that year.) to 25 May 1994. (Note: Finished in the magazine's July 1994 issue, released on 25 May of that year.) Alan Grant wrote the scripts, which were then translated to Japanese. It made use of blending photos of human models with miniature latex models, distorted with a colour photocopier, and then painted on. It was the first manga series ever created by a British artist.

The manga found an audience in Japan, particularly with its local alternative scene, and allowed Luke to come in contact with fellow manga artist Yasushi Nirasawa. Luke was also commissioned by Kodansha to create a one-shot crossover with Tsuyoshi Shikkari Shinasai for sister magazine Weekly Morning. It was published under the title Dominator in Tokyo (ドミネーターinトーキョー) in November 1993. (Note: Published in the magazine's 49th issue of 1993, cover dated 25 November.)

Comparing the 1988 Metal Hammer comic to the 1993 Afternoon version, Luke stated that "the Metal Hammer version was very much a jokey thing, as it was very difficult to tell an ongoing story in half a page every two weeks […] For the Japanese version, we made a lot of punk references in the script and the art – there's a lot of Clash and Sex Pistols on the karaoke machines out there – and introduced the other three demons: Extricator, Decimator and Lady Violator. The tone was semi-serious, but was offset by the comedy provided by Extricator and Decimator."

=== Renga Studios and hiatus (1995–2000) ===
After the manga's conclusion, Tony Luke and Alan Grant were approached by various film companies to buy the rights to Dominator for a potential film adaptation. Not wanting to lose control of their work, Luke and Grant established Renga Studios (later called Renga Media) in 1995 to put their characters, such as Dominator, under copyright. Yasushi Nirasawa and actor Doug Bradley also joined in.

During that time, Luke moved on to other projects, such as Sin 7, Hellkatt for Manga Entertainment, and Renga! for DC Thomson. Luke, through Renga Studios, would also produce a low-budget short film for the fledgling Sci-Fi Channel titled Archangel Thunderbird in 1998, where it became a surprise hit.

=== Film production (2000–2003) ===
Tony Luke and Alan Grant would return to work on Dominator for an animated adaptation. With technology rapidly becoming more advanced by the late 1990s, they thought it was more feasible to produce it through computer-generated imagery, instead of using stop motion like with Archangel Thunderbird. Although the original plan was to make an episodic web series available for download on the Renga Studios website, it was decided to instead make a straight adaptation of the 1993 Afternoon manga series.

In the summer of 2000, the Sci-Fi Channel approved to co-produce the project with Luke and Grant. Luke was also given £10,000 from the Sci-Fi Channel for production, following the success of Archangel Thunderbird on their network. During that time in August, Luke was diagnosed with mesothelioma in his lungs, forcing him to halt work for a few months whilst receiving treatment to surgically remove the cancer.

Production officially began in November 2001 and finished in April 2003, with both British and Japanese artists being involved. It was animated using Cinema 4D, Poser, Bryce and LightWave 3D software on Mac computers. Footage was edited using Adobe After Effects and Final Cut Pro. Noting his recent experience of having cancer, Luke stated that "in many ways it was making the film that helped me keep my focus in the darkest days. In some ways it was very therapeutic and I certainly used some of my negative feelings in creating some of the bad characters." It was the first British computer-generated animated film.

Dani Filth was cast as Dominator, as he was approached for permission to use his band's music, Cradle of Filth, in the film, and because it was decided to have an established rock star to play Dominator. Doug Bradley, who was also executive producer, was cast as Dr. Payne and Lord Desecrator, and he suggested Ingrid Pitt to play Lady Violator. Alex Cox was cast as Bishop, as he and Luke were co-presenters in a previous BBC Two documentary. Yasushi Nirasawa redesigned Lady Violator for the production. Other bands that had their music featured included local bands like Digitalis, Killing Mode, and the Guillotines.

In a forum post on the Sweatdrop Studios website in 2010, Luke clarified on the timeline of production for Dominator; having originally planned it as a web series, about 40 minutes of animation were completed in 2000 before Luke was diagnosed with cancer. The plan for it being a feature film instead of a web series was at the Sci-Fi Channel's behest in exchange for their support the following year, and thus the existing footage had to be "blown up" for broadcast, exposing the unpolished textures. Luke was also unhappy with Dominator being labelled a "Brit-manga animation" by the Sci-Fi Channel without his knowledge, claiming the misleading term was forced on the film due to it being based on the 1993 Afternoon manga.

== Release ==
Dominator premiered at the 2003 Cannes Film Festival on 21 May 2003, where it was positively received initially. It was screened at the Duke of York's Picture House in Brighton on 20 September 2003, released for home video on 6 October by Salvation Films, and was broadcast on the Sci-Fi Channel later that year.

Reception to the film was mostly negative due to its apparently poor animation, and partially due to it being mislabelled as "Brit-manga animation" and an anime film by the Sci-Fi Channel and its home video distributor, Salvation Films, giving the false impression it was a Japanese production. However, it has received some positive reviews, including from CJ Lines of Meltdown magazine and M. J. Simpson of SFX magazine, and the determination of director Tony Luke, who was reportedly struggling with depression after his bout with cancer and an unforgiving work schedule, has been praised.

== Legacy ==
Two short films following the Dominator film were produced by Renga Media: A Brief History of Hell in 2004, and Heavy Metal vs Dominator in 2005, the latter of which was a crossover with characters from the Heavy Metal universe. Plans for a sequel were reported in 2004, with one proposal being titled Dominator and the Cradle of Death, but were cancelled.

In late 2006, Renga Media revealed Dominator X, which was going to be an entirely new revamp for the series. This bigger-budget remake was going to run as a manga illustrated by Masanori Shino, as well as a downloadable series and film. Dominator X was slated for a release in 2007, but was later cancelled two years later due to financial and rights holder conflicts. Renga Media was liquidated by the late 2000s, with its staff moving to Renegade Arts Entertainment, co-founded by Tony Luke. Luke has since died after a long battle with cancer on 17 February 2016.

== See also ==
- Renga Media
