= Freak Out (film) =

- DVD cover
- Directed by: Christian James
- Written by: Christian James; Dan Palmer
- Produced by: Ian Chaplin; Yazz Fetto; Christian James; Steven Kovacs; Simon Nurrish; Dan Palmer
- Starring: James Heathcote; Dan Palmer
- Cinematography: Christian James
- Music by: Stuart Fox
- Distributed by: Anchor Bay Entertainment (2005) (USA) (all media); Anchor Bay Entertainment (UK) (2005) (UK) (all media); Epix Media (2007) (Germany) (DVD)
- Release date: 11 September 2004
- Running time: 92 minutes
- Country: United Kingdom
- Language: English
- Budget: £30,000 (estimated)

Freak Out is a 2004 British horror comedy film. It was directed by Christian James and written by him and Dan Palmer.

== Plot ==
When die-hard horror movie fan Merv Doody (James Heathcote) finds a dangerous escaped mental patient at his doorstep, he has a panic attack but regains his cool when he realizes the potential in the hapless killer. Merv invites best pal Onkey (Dan Palmer) over and the two soon set about executing a makeover on the maniac to create the ultimate slasher movie villain. Outfitted with a snazzy orange jumpsuit, an appropriately menacing hockey mask, and armed with a spatula, Merv and Onkey's murderous creation soon sets out on a violent rampage that sends the small-town citizens of Redwater Cove running for their lives. Upon realizing that they are the only ones who can put an end to the bloody killing spree, the longtime horror fans prepare to put their vast knowledge of slasher disposal to the ultimate test.

== Cast ==
Actor	Role
James Heathcote	Merv Doody
Dan Palmer	Onkey
Nicola Connell	Abby
Yazz Fetto	Looney/Sheriff Craven
Desmond Cullum-Jones	Old Man Wilson
James King	Merv's Boss
Tony Rogers	Chip McCready
John Fallon	Looney Doll (voice)
Abby Forknall	Chip's Bitch #2
Gemma Forknall	Chip's Bitch #1
Chili Gold	Cherry
James Hicks	Jeremiah Gibble
Louise Hughes	Sexy Nurse
Less Than Jake	As Themselves
Chris Rhodes	Doyle DelFurie
Jane Scarlett	Scream Queen
Richard Scott	Spatula Victim
Peter Stanley-Ward	Inkey
Simon Stanley-Ward	Hagfan
Andrea Scifo	Smoking Hagfan (as Chris Wright)

== Production ==
Freak Out began filming on 20 October 1999, and ended 12 June 2003 with an estimated budget of £30,000. The film was shot at both Bournemouth, Dorset, England, UK, and London, England, UK.

== Reception ==
The film garnered mostly positive reviews from critics.

=== Awards ===
In 2004, Director Christian James, won the Commendation Award during the Festival of Fantastic Films, in UK. That same year, he won the Best Genre Cross Over award at the Rhode Island International Horror Film Festival.
