= Elza Kephart =

Canadian film director

- Born: Canada
- Occupations: film director, film producer, and screenwriter
- Website: Midnight Kingdom

Elza Kephart, is a Canadian filmmaker, from Montreal, Quebec. She owns her own production company, Midnight Kingdom Films.

== Career ==
Kephart's first feature film was Graveyard Alive: A Zombie Nurse in Love, which she wrote, directed, and produced. The film was well received by critics, who appreciated its camp horror and modern feminist motifs, while at the same time evoking the traditional days of black and white, Techniscope wide-screen. Since its premiere in 2003 the film has screened in over 20 international film festivals and garnered numerous awards, as well as being picked up for distribution and international sales.

In 2005, Kephart provided computer support for The Greatest Game Ever Played. In 2006 she was assistant to Tony Goldwyn while he directed The Last Kiss. She also appeared in a 2009 documentary Pretty Bloody: The Women of Horror.

In 2013, Kephart released Go Into the Wilderness, shot in Quebec's remote North Shore.

In 2020, Kephart completed work on her horror-comedy film Slaxx, released as a Shudder Original title in March 2021.

== Awards ==
Kephart was nominated at the 2005 Cinevagas B-Movie film festival for:

- Best B Movie
- Best Director
- Best Screenplay

== Filmography ==
Director
| Year | Film | Genre | Other notes |
|---|---|---|---|
| 2002 | Naughty Soxxx | TV series | |
| 2003 | Graveyard Alive: A Zombie Nurse in Love | Feature film | Slamdance Film Festival- Best Cinematography |
| 2006 | Beyond the Pearly Gates of Ill-Repute | Short film | Fantasia Festival-Premier co-directed with Elizabeth Lawrence |
| 2013 | Go in the Wilderness | Feature film | Festival du nouveau cinéma-Montréal-Official Selection |
| 2020 | Slaxx | Feature film | |
Writer
| Year | Title | Genre | Notes |
| 2002 | Naughty Soxxx | TV series | |
| 2003 | Graveyard Alive: A Zombie Nurse in Love | Feature film | |
| 2006 | Beyond the Pearly Gates of Ill-Repute | Short film | |
| 2013 | Go in the Wilderness | Feature film | |
