= Fright Night Film Fest =

Horror film festival

Louisville Fright Night Film Fest
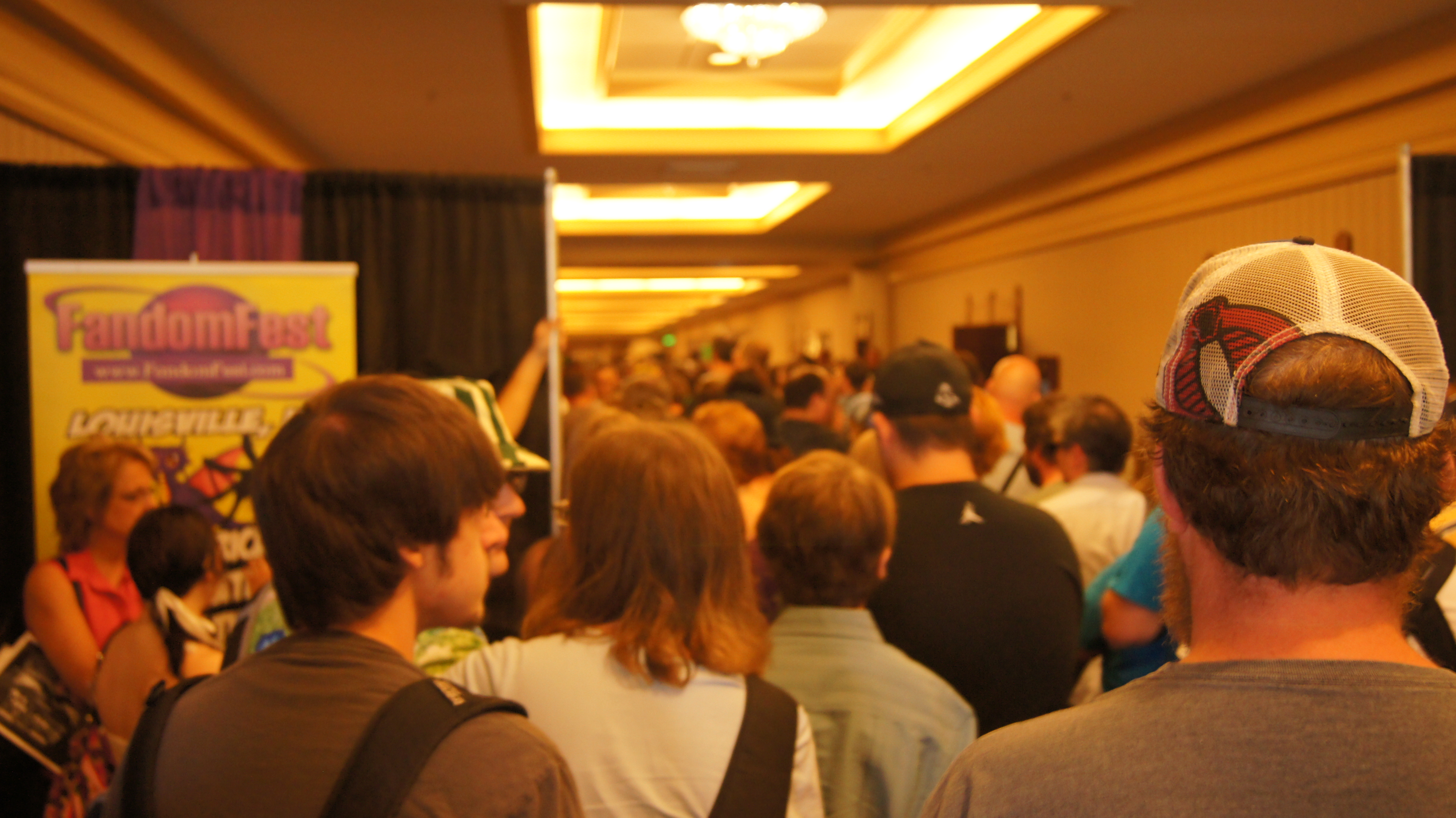
- Status: Active
- Genre: Film festival
- Venue: Galt House
- Location: Louisville, Kentucky
- Country: United States
- Inaugurated: 2005
- Attendance: 16,700 people (2012)
- Organizer: Ken Daniels and Myra Daniels
- Website: www.louisvillehalloween.com/fright-night-film-festival/

Fright Night Film Fest, also known as Louisville Fright Night Film Fest, is an annual horror film festival in Louisville, Kentucky. The festival was first founded in 2005 by Ken Daniels and is typically held in July at the Galt House, which is famous for housing guests for the Kentucky Derby. The focus of the Fright Night Film Fest focuses on genre films such as horror, science fiction, fantasy, action, and cult from around the world including new films from Asia, Africa, Middle East, Latin America, Europe and North America.

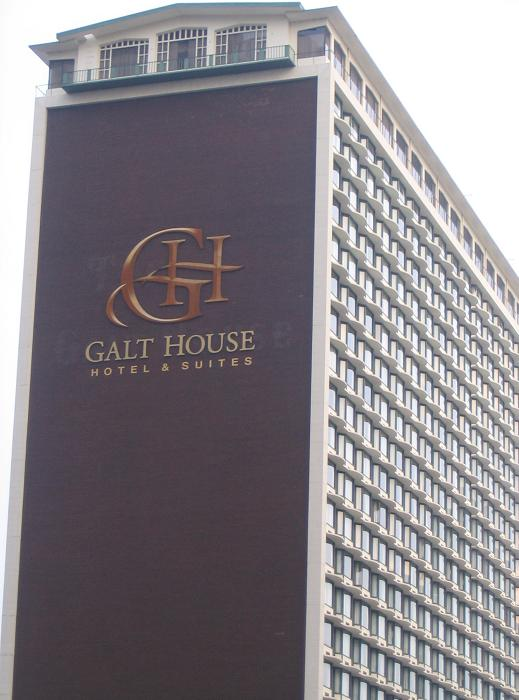
Galt House

Kentucky-made films such as "Dead Moon Rising", "Hell is Full" and "Stash" got distribution by screenings at this film festival with horror convention and now the convention has expanded to include Fandomfest, a showcase of pop culture, gaming and cosplay. Awards such as the Corman award are presented to films, actors, or directors that excel within their respective categories. Many of the filmmakers have garnered distribution and representation as a result of the notable festival among Hollywood horror filmmakers. Fright Night Film Fest launches careers internationally. In 2013, The organizers announced that during the 2012 Fright Night Film Fest packed with over 16,700 people, and it screened more than 120 films within three days. Some of the largest horror online publications have called it the "Sundance of Horror".

The horror magazine Horror Hound has sponsored the festival for many years and called it "the largest genre film festival in the country." Moreover, the Louisville government publicly announced that this film festival is the country's largest genre-specific film festival.

After the last film fest in 2017, Fright Night Film Fest 2020 was held on October 3, 2020.

== Award winners ==
=== 2006 ===
- Best Picture - The Hazing
- Best Short - Fangs for the memories and Disconnected
- Best Soundtrack - Silence of Isbella
- Best Cinematography - Nightmare Man
- Best of the Fest Audience Award - Katie Bird and Bad Reputation
- Most Original Film Award - Secret Life of Sarah Sheldon
- Best Zombie Film Award - Dead Lands:The Rising
- Best Special Effects Award - Edison Death Machine
- Honorable Mention - Joshua

=== 2007 ===
- Best Feature - Scrapbook
- Best Short - Woman's Intuition
- Best Soundtrack - Gimme Skelter
- Best Special Effects - Horrors of War
- Best Zombie - Dead Moon Rising
- Best Foreign Horror Film - Bad Dreams (Sweden)
- Most Original Idea - The Guardian (Dir. Aaron Marshall)
- Horror Icon of the Year - Tony Moran
- Honorable Mention - Salvation (J.A. Steel)
- Honorable Mention - 9 Lives of Mara (Balaji K. Kumar)
- Honorable Mention - Burial Party (Joseph Dodge)
- Honorable Mention - The Day They Came Back (Scott Goldberg)

=== 2008 ===
- Best Action - Razor Sharp
- Best Actor - Trent Haaga
- Best Actress - Monica Knight (Windcroft)
- Best of the Fest - Bonnie and Clyde vs. Dracula
- Best Cinematography - Lily (Daniel Boneville)
- Best Feature - Windcroft (Dir. Evan Meszaros)
- Best Comedy - Shh! It's Alive (Dir. Ryan Cadima)
- Most Original Film - Gunther Today's Happy Time Fun Show (Dir. JImmy Humphrey)
- Best Sci Fi - O2
- Best Director- Evan Meszaros
- Best Short - Of Darkness (Dir. Gary E. Irwin)
- Best One Liner - Zombie Apocalypse
- Best Zombie - Zombthology (Dir. Elias Dansey, Chris Kiros, Robert Elkins)
- Best Soundtrack - Zombie Love
- Best Special Effects - Curse of the Flesh
- Kentucky Filmmaker of the Year - George Bonilla
- Horror Icon of the Year - Angus Scrimm
- Honorable Mention - Paper Dolls
- Honorable Mention - Liar's Pendulum
- Honorable Mention - Alone
- Honorable Mention - Taste of the Flesh
- Honorable Mention - The Conjurer
- Honorable Mention - The Vagrant
- Honorable Mention - Miyuki

=== 2009 ===
- Best Short - Double
- Best Foreign Short - The Gynecologist
- Best Foreign Feature - Family Demons
- Best Soundtrack/Score - Eat Me: The Musical
- Best SPFX Practical - Devil's Grove
- Best Action - The Dogs of Chinatown
- Best Sci Fi - Fun on Earth
- Best Zombie - Deadlands2:Trapped
- Best Comedy - Auburn Hills Breakdown
- Best Director- Jack Daniel Stanley
- Best Fan Film - Indiana Jones and the Mummies Skull
- Best Feature - Mantra
- Best Animated - Night of the Invisible Man (Dir. Tyler Meyer)
- Best Cinematographer - Huneman Brown Eagle for Mrs. Brummets Garden
- Best Actor - Ron Pallio Curse of Micha Rood
- Best Actress - Cassandra Kane Family Demons
- Best of the Year - Sea of Dust
- Honorable Mention - Shellter
- Honorable Mention - Alone
- Honorable Mention - The Revenant
- Honorable Mention - I Don't Sleep I Dream
- Honorable Mention - Run! Bitch Run!
- Honorable Mention - The Vagrant
- Honorable Mention - Blood on the Highway
- Honorable Mention - Bikini Girls on Ice
- Honorable Mention - Thirsty
- Honorable Mention - Dead Sucks

=== 2010 ===
- Best Short - Alice Jacobs Is Dead (Dir. Alex Horwitz)
- Best Feature - Shadowland (Dir. Wyatt Weed)
- Best Soundtrack/Score - Danger Zombies Run (Dir. Brian Wimer)
- Scream Queen of the Year - Heather Langenkamp
- Best Special FX Practical - The Taken (FX. Brian Sipe)
- Best Screenplay - The Ripper (Joe Randazzo)
- Best Action- God of Vampires
- Best Sci Fi - Flying Saucer Exodus (Dir. Jerry Williams)
- Best Zombie - Revelation (Dir. Will Graver)
- Best Comedy - Danger, Zombies, Run
- Best Director - Morgan Mead (My Bloody Wedding)
- Best Fan Film - Hell Raiser: Deader Winters Lament (Dir. Jonathan S. Kui)
- Best Documentary - Graphic Sexual Horror (Dir. Barbara Bell)
- Kentucky Filmmaker of the Year - Jacob Ennis
- Best Cinematography - The Prometheus Project
- Best Actor - Kane Hodder Old Habits Die Hard
- Best Actress - Jessica Von The Taken
- Horror Icon of the Year - Tom Atkins
- Best of the Fest - The Taken (Dir. Richard Valentine)
- Audience Pick - My Bloody Wedding (Dir. Morgan Mead)
- Honorable Mention - Gun Town (Dir. Lee Vervoort)
- Honorable Mention - Get Off My Porch (Dir. Patrick Rea)
- Honorable Mention - The Survivors (Dir. Soham Mehta)
- Honorable Mention - Moon-Lite (Dir. Kenneth Dowell)
- Honorable Mention - Nightmare at Bunnyman Bridge (Dir. Robert Elkins)
- Lifetime Achievement Award - Roger Corman

=== 2011 ===
- Best Actor - John Wells Overtime
- Best Actress - Sebrina Siegel Overtime
- Best Director - Darrin Dickerson (D4)
- Best Screenplay - The Resurrection of Blake House (Steven C. Gladstone and Joe Randazzo)
- Best Cinematography - Brian Cunningham Overtime
- Best Soundtrack - Jason Paige Overtime
- Best Action - Overtime (Dir. Brian Cunningham, Matt Niehoff)
- Lifetime Achievement Award - John Carpenter
- Best of the Fest - Overtime
- Best Feature - D4
- Best One-Liner - Overtime
- Filmmakers of the Year - Brian Cunningham, Matt Niehoff Overtime

=== 2012 ===
- Lifetime Achievement Award- John Rhys-Davies
- Best Foreign Short-Moxina (Dir. Ryota Nakanishi)
- Best Foreign Feature-Muirhouse
- Best Short-The Keeper
- Best Feature-A Little Bit Zombie
- Best Director-Patrick Rea for Nailbiter
- Best Of the Fest-Nailbiter
- Best "Grindhouse" Film-The Terrifier
- Best Zombie Film-A Little Bit Zombie
- Best Soundtrack-Below Zero
- Best Cinematography-An Evening With My Comatose Mother
- Best Screenplay The Man Who Killed Sandra Wallace by Anders Nelson
- Best Practical SPFX-Huff
- Best CGI-Fallout
- Best Action Film-Fallout
- Best Sci Fi Film-Ray Bradbury's Kaliedoscope
- Best Fan Film-Justice League Auditions
- Best Comedy-A Little Bit Zombie
- Best Documentary-Beast Wishes
- KY Filmmaker of the Year-David Heavener
- Horror Icon of the Year-Sid Haig
- Best Animated-(Computer)-Lola
- Best Animated-(Practical)-Odokuro
- Best Actress Kristin Booth for Below Zero
- Best Actor Lance Henriksen for It's in the Blood

=== 2013 ===
- Best Feature (Horror Category) Cannon Fodder
- Kentucky Filmmakers of the Year Biting Pig Productions
- Best Screenplay (Horror) Sadistic by Michael Gibrall
- Best Screenplay (Fantasy) Biofusionoid Wen-Chia Chang
- Best Screenplay (SciFi) Bounty Hunter by Amy McCorkle and Melissa Goodman
- Best Zombie Film-NI-28
- Best Cinematography Fortune Cookie Prophecies
- Best Soundtrack NI-28
- Best Foreign Feature Dunderland
- Best Foreign Short REFUGIO 115
- Best Super Short THE RISING
- Best Action 95 ECHOERS
- Best Short Film In Between
- Best Feature (Sci Fi) Space Milkshake
- Best Special FX (Practical makeup) Cannon Fodder
- Best Special FX (CGI) 95 ECHOERS
- Best Comedy Motivational Growth
- Best Director Armen Evrensel for Space Milkshake
- Best of The Fest Space Milkshake
- Honorable Mentions
- She's Having a Baby
- Thirteen
- Daughters
- Blood Sucka Jones
- Sader Ridge

== Guest celebrities ==
=== 2013 ===
- William Shatner
- Stan Lee
- Gillian Anderson
- Gene Simmons
- Norman Reedus
- Michael Rooker
- Lew Temple
- Adrian Paul
- Adam Baldwin
- Jewel Staite
- Alan Tudyk
- Saul Rubinek
- Grant Wilson
- Jason David Frank
- Garry Chalk
- Gene Simmons
- Kevin Smith
- Jason Mewes
- Kane Hodder
- Jon Bernthal
- Fred Dekker

=== 2014 ===
- Doug Bradley
- Ken Foree
- John Kassir
- Jeff Reddick
- Don Shanks
- Tamara Glynn
- Matthew Walker
- Erik Preston
- Leslie Hoffman
- Ira Heiden
- Bradley Gregg
- Jennifer Rubin

== See also ==
- List of attractions and events in the Louisville metropolitan area
