= There's Something Out There =

- Directed by: Brian Pulido
- Written by: Brian Pulido
- Produced by: Brian Pulido producer = ((Francisca Pulido))
- Starring: Phil Blackmon; Scott Jordan; Patti Tindall
- Cinematography: Adam Goldfine Production Design = ((Francisca Pulido))
- Edited by: Doug Howard
- Music by: Jim Casella
- Distributed by: Eternal Entertainment
- Release date: October 2004 (Scottsdale International Film Festival)
- Running time: 16 minutes
- Country: United States
- Language: English

There's Something Out There is a 2004 short horror film written and directed by Brian Pulido. The sixteen-minute film was produced by Eternal Entertainment and won awards from Cine-Macabre and the Rhode Island International Horror Film Festival.

As part of the promotion for the film, Brian Puildo wrote a one-shot comic book titled Killer Gnomes which was published by Avatar Press. It was illustrated by Eddy Barrows.

== Plot ==
Life is going great for Brad and Penny until Brad brings home a smiling garden gnome. According to legend the gnome will protect their garden, but not this gnome. A gift turns into a murderous nightmare as the pint-sized menace takes protecting the garden to a terrifying extreme.

== Cast ==
- Phil Blackmon .... Arthur
- Scott Jordan .... Brad
- Zack Miller .... The Gnome
- Patti Tindall .... Penny
