= Camp Blood: The Musical =

- Directed by: Tanner Barklow; Jefferson Craig; Thomas Hughes
- Written by: Tanner Barklow; Jefferson Craig; Thomas Hughes
- Produced by: Tanner Barklow; Jefferson Craig; Thomas Hughes
- Starring: Fia Alvarez; Tom Bogdan; James Bolenbaugh; Kitty Brazelton; Ashley Hanna; Emma Manion
- Cinematography: Tanner Barklow; Jefferson Craig; Thomas Hughes; Alex Ward
- Edited by: Tanner Barklow; Jefferson Craig; Thomas Hughes
- Music by: Tanner Barklow; Jefferson Craig; Thomas Hughes
- Release date: 2006 (Rhode Island International Film Festival)
- Running time: 30 minutes
- Country: United States
- Language: English
- Budget: $200

Camp Blood: The Musical is a 2006 '80s style slasher musical underground film by Tanner Barklow, Jefferson Craig, and Thomas Hughes. The movie follows six teenagers (a virgin, jock, whore, nerd, rebel and goth) who arrive at Camp Blood to work as counselors for the summer but instead find themselves terrorized by a killer in a ski mask.

== Characters ==
- Sofia Alvarez – Kris, the virgin
- Dan Wilcox – JT, the jock
- Jacob Wolf – Cain, the rebel
- Ashley Hanna (Kitty Brazelton, vocals) – Angel, the goth
- Emma Manion – Justine, the slut
- Tom Shoemaker – Marty, the nerd
- Jim Bolenbaugh – (Thomas Bogdan, vocals) - The Killer
- Ben Pawlik – Leo, the janitor
- Scott Neagle – Simon Scuddamore, head counselor
- Julieanne Smolinski – The Lesbian Trucker

== Musical numbers ==
- "The Camp Blood Theme", sung by the cast
- "In Your Arms", sung by Kris & JT
- "When the Tops Come Off", sung by Angel & Justine and the cast
- "It's a Chase (Death Race)", sung by Angel
- "In Your Arms (Reprise)", sung by Kris & JT
- "The Killer's Song", sung by The Killer and the cast
- "Victory Song/Camp Blood Theme (Reprise)" sung by Kris
- Additionally, Falconhammer provided the opening title song "Demon of Time".

== Reception ==
Reception for the film was mostly positive. Film Threat gave the film four stars, calling it "a scream in more ways than one". DVD Talk commented that the movie lacked "quality acting, production values, dialogue, or even singing voices. Yet, for some strange reason, when the entire thirty-minute film is over, all those shortcomings are completely forgivable."

=== Official selections and awards ===
- Chicago Horror Film Festival (2006)
- Lumberyard Media's Horrorfest (2006), Golden 2x4 for Best Picture, Best Actor (Wolf), and Best Song ("It's a Chase (Death Race)")
- Rhode Island International Horror Film Festival (2006), Audience Award
- Bare Bones International Film Festival (2011)
