= Bone Sickness =

- Directed by: Brian Paulin
- Written by: Brian Paulin
- Produced by: Brian Paulin; Rich George
- Starring: Darya Zabinski; Ruby Larocca; Rich George; Brian Paulin; Kevin Barbare; Ernest Hutcherson; Lorna Hutcherson
- Production company: Morbid Vision Films
- Release date: October 8, 2004
- Running time: 98 minutes
- Country: United States
- Language: English
- Budget: $4,000

Bone Sickness is a low-budget 2004 horror film directed by Brian Paulin. The plot is about a degenerative bone disease. The film runs for 98 minutes.

== Plot ==
Alex McNetti (Rich George) has a rare disease which gives him very brittle bones. His friend Thomas Granger (Brian Paulin) believes that he has found the cure by feeding his friend dead flesh to counteract the terrible disease. However the process does have its side effects including making Alex cough up and vomit worms, and also turning him into a zombie. The dead start to rise from their graves and butcher every living human they see to pieces, including a heavily armed SWAT team, as well as two street hardened security guards who have been working the beat for so long they forget to take their hats off. The zombies later invade a populated city, killing every living person in sight. Later, a half zombified Alex learns that the zombies rising from their graves were reanimated by Goblins who eventually kill him.

== Cast ==
- Darya Zabinski
- Ruby Larocca
- Rich George
- Brian Paulin
- Kevin Barbare
- Ernest Hutcherson
- Lorna Hutcherson
- John E. McCarthy III
- Joseph E. Olson
- Griffen Brohman

== Reception ==
In a negative review, Peter Dendle called the film "disgusting even by zombie movie standards". D. W. Bostaph of Dread Central rated the film 4.5/5 stars and called it "a wonderful mixture of homage, talent, and love." Writing for DVD Talk, Scott Weinberg rated the film 2/5 stars and described it as "a special kind of amateur-hour awful."
