= 247°F =

- Theatrical release poster
- Directed by: Levan Bakhia; Beqa Jguburia
- Written by: Lloyd S. Wagner; Levan Bakhia (story)
- Produced by: Levan Bakhia; Levan Kobakhidze; David Patarkalishvili
- Starring: Scout Taylor-Compton; Christina Ulloa; Travis Van Winkle; Michael Copon; Tyler Mane
- Cinematography: Vigen Vartanov
- Edited by: Peter Hollywood
- Music by: David Laurie
- Distributed by: Halcyon International
- Release date: September 1, 2011 (Georgia)
- Running time: 90 minutes
- Country: Georgia
- Language: English
- Budget: $650,000

247 °F is a horror film directed by Levan Bakhia and Beqa Jguburia. Cast members include Scout Taylor-Compton, Christina Ulloa, Travis Van Winkle, Michael Copon and Tyler Mane. It was filmed in Tbilisi, Georgia and finished filming by July, 2011. It received its first international release date in Georgia on 1 September 2011. The film is about a group of friends who get trapped in a sauna.

== Plot ==
Jenna (Scout Taylor-Compton) gets into a car accident with her boyfriend, Jamie, who eventually dies. Three years later, while coping with her past tragedy, Jenna is invited to stay for the weekend in a lakeside cabin with her best friend Renee (Christina Ulloa). They are joined by Renee’s irresponsible boyfriend, Michael (Michael Copon), and his friend, Ian (Travis Van Winkle), and sail off to Ian's uncle Wade's (Tyler Mane) lakeside cabin. Wade greets them, along with his friendly dog, Beau. They settle into the cabin and plan to attend a party, since a festival is happening in the nearby town that night. Jenna goes to her room and refuses to take her pills so she can have fun with her friends. While they eat dinner, Wade mentions he may not be around while they are away because he has work to do. The group gets fascinated when they stumble inside a sauna Wade built. While they enjoy spending time inside, the temperature rises, and they decide to swim in the lake. Trembling in the cold, they all head back inside the sauna. Meanwhile, Michael gets high from the marijuana Wade had given to him, while Renee rebuffs his sexual advances. This upsets Michael, and he decides not to follow the others into the sauna, while clumsily knocking things over. As the temperature continues to rise, Renee ultimately decides to leave, but the door is blocked from the outside. The trio thinks it is just one of Michael's pranks since they all know he's mad at Renee, which they don't find amusing. They soon realize that they are trapped in the sauna and attempt to break a small window on the door, injuring Ian's hand. They take turns gasping for air as the temperature rises even higher, and they make another unsuccessful attempt to unblock the door from the outside. The group then finds a hidden controller they can't risk destroying, since Ian believes it would only alter the temperature.

Meanwhile, Wade is seen handling the fireworks for the festival with another guy when Beau tracks the trio's scream for help from the back of the house. Michael shows up at Wade's, and both disregard Beau's barking. Michael clearly thinks the three left him and attended the party, since he couldn't help himself from getting high. The two hang out and start a conversation as Michael explains that he wasn't allowed to catch up with the group at the party because he didn't have a ticket, so he went home.

Back at the sauna, the situation escalates as the group runs out of water to drink and Renee gets sick from the temperature. Renee ultimately decides to break the controller, thinking it would lower the temperature, but is stopped by Jenna, who inadvertently strikes her head, leaving her unconscious. Jenna starts freaking out and decides to break the controller herself, which does, in fact, increase the heat, as Ian feared. Ian becomes hysterical and burns himself badly in an attempt to prevent the steamer from heating the room out of control. He breaks it, and the steamer blows up, killing him. The explosion seemingly frees the door, and Jenna steps out in shock and wanders the house before she wakes from unconsciousness, realizing she is still trapped in the sauna. She finds Renee alive and lets her near the window to breathe as Jenna herself goes unconscious as well from the escaping natural gas, which she manages to plug just in time.

Michael returns to the cabin where flashbacks show him absentmindedly knocking over wooden steps and setting them against the door. It is revealed that the occupants fall into place, the steps against a raised floor, as they talk and move the door themselves. Meanwhile, Wade arrives at the cabin and discovers the two girls alive and calls the paramedics, who take Jenna and Renee away on stretchers as they hold hands.

== Cast ==
- Scout Taylor-Compton as Jenna
- Christina Ulloa as Renee
- Travis Van Winkle as Ian
- Michael Copon as Michael
- Tyler Mane as Wade

== Home release ==
247°F was released on DVD and Blu-ray in the U.S. on October 23, 2012, from Anchor Bay Entertainment.
