= Kevin Sean Michaels =

American film director, artist, producer and entertainer

- Kevin Sean Michaels at the 2007 Fangoria Weekend of Horrors
- Born: Brooklyn, New York, United States
- Occupation(s): Film director, artist, producer, entertainer

Kevin Sean Michaels is an American film director, artist, producer and entertainer.

== Biography and career ==
Michaels is best known as an Art Director for Troma Entertainment as well as directing and producing his own documentaries, Vampira: The Movie and The Wild World of Ted V. Mikels.

== Radio show ==
In 2015, Michaels began hosting a radio show on Universal Broadcasting Network called "Friend or Foe", where guests included Weird Al Yankovic and others.

== Film work ==
Michaels was Art Director for Troma Entertainment for five years, and briefly worked on Troma's Poultrygeist: Night of the Chicken Dead. While at Troma, Michaels designed and edited 250 DVD covers, 90% of their DVD titles.

Michaels' first documentary was Vampira: The Movie, which profiled Maila Nurmi, the first horror host. The film featured testimonials by Sid Haig, Julie Strain, Kevin Eastman, Forrest Ackerman, Debbie Rochon, John Zacherle, Lloyd Kaufman, Bill Moseley, Cassandra Peterson, Jami Deadly, Jerry Only and horror historian David J. Skal. The score was written and performed by Ari Lehman, the first Jason Voorhees of Friday The 13th. Premiering in October 2006, Vampira: The Movie was released on DVD in September 2007 by Alpha Video, and won a Rondo Hatton Classic Horror Award in 2008 for Best Independent Production.

Michaels' second documentary was The Wild World of Ted V. Mikels on director Ted V. Mikels, who produced The Astro-Zombies, Girl in Gold Boots, The Doll Squad and many others. The DVD was released in 2010 by Alpha Video. Michaels also served as Creative Consultant on Mikels' third installment in his Astro-Zombies series. It was narrated by John Waters.

Michaels' third documentary was Ingrid Pitt: Beyond the Forest on actress Ingrid Pitt, who starred in Where Eagles Dare and numerous productions by Hammer Films. This animated short turned out to be the last project for Pitt, who recorded the narration in May 2010. The animation is by 10-year-old artist Perry Chen, under the guidance of two-time Academy Award nominee Bill Plympton. Ingrid Pitt: Beyond the Forest made the long-list and qualified for the Academy Award for Short Animated Film in 2011.

Michaels produced a documentary starring David Lynch called Beyond The Noise: My Transcendental Meditation Journey, by young film student Dana Farley, who has severe dyslexia and attention deficit disorder. He currently creates music videos and content for Lynch's non-profit organization.

In 2010, Michaels was one of 75 international artists and animators who Plympton referred to as "Dog Jammers" for a remake of Plympton's short film called Guard Dog Global Jam. In 2012, Michaels produced a short animated film called, The Namazu, animated by Dani Bowman, with voices contributed by Tom Kenny and Stella Ritter (daughter of John Ritter).
