= Nightmare Factory (film) =

2011 documentary film

- Written by: Donna D. Davies
- Directed by: Donna D. Davies
- Country of origin: Canada
- Original language: English

Production
- Producer: Donna D. Davies
- Production companies: Ruby Tree Films; Night Creatures

Original release
- Network: The Movie Network
- Release: October 27, 2011

Nightmare Factory is a 2011 documentary film directed by Donna Davies about KNB EFX Group, a special effects company.

== Premise ==
Donna Davies profiles KNB EFX Group, a special effects company that specializes in practical effects.

== Interviews ==
- George A. Romero
- Quentin Tarantino
- Robert Rodriguez
- Elijah Wood
- John Carpenter
- John Landis
- Frank Darabont
- Simon Pegg
- Greg Nicotero
- Howard Berger
- Robert Kirkman
- Norman Reedus
- Laurie Holden
- Cerina Vincent
- Tom Savini

== Release ==
Nightmare Factory premiered on The Movie Network on October 27, 2011. Epix aired it on American television on October 30, 2013.

== Reception ==
Drew Taylor of IndieWire rated it a letter grade of A− and called it "mostly a hoot", though he criticized the interviews with Tarantino and Rodriguez as probably coming from DVD extras. Brad McHargue of Dread Central rated it 4/5 stars and wrote that although it is occasionally amateurish and jumbled, the documentary is insightful about the role of special effects in filmmaking. James Marsh of Screen Anarchy called it "exhaustive to the point of being exhausting", comparing it to a very long DVD extra.

== Awards ==
=== 2012 ===
- Indie Fest: Award of Excellence (July 2012)
- Maverick Movie Awards: Nominee: Best Chronicle, Best Editing; Winner: Best Special Effects Make-up
- Rhode Island International Film Festival: Best Documentary
