= Sea of Dust (film) =

- Directed by: Scott Bunt
- Written by: Scott Bunt
- Produced by: Patrick T. Rousseau; Noah Workman
- Starring: Tom Savini; Ingrid Pitt; Bill Timoney; Edward X. Young; Troy Holland; Stuart Rudin; John Correll
- Cinematography: Brian Fass
- Edited by: Ron Kalish
- Music by: Jasper Drew
- Distributed by: Cinema Epoch - North America
- Release date: September 10, 2008 (BUT Film Festival)
- Running time: 90 minutes
- Country: United States
- Language: English

Sea of Dust is a 2008 horror-fantasy film directed by Scott Bunt and starring Tom Savini and Ingrid Pitt. It takes its name from the boundary separating reality from religious truth, a boundary epitomized by Prester John's Sea of Dust.

== Production ==
A stylistic tribute to the sixties work of Hammer Films and Italian genre director Mario Bava, Sea incorporates the Prester John myth into its heady stew of surrealism, social satire, and comic invention. Pitt went as far as to call her final screen appearance "one of the best films I ever worked on."

While the tongue-in-cheek "horror" film garnered largely positive reviews in the genre press, including such publications as Canada's Rue-Morgue, the U.K.'s Gorezone, and America's Fangoria, its Midnight Movie structure and social critiques also served to polarize audiences. The film can be read as a dark satire of George W. Bush's war on terror and the rise of Neo-Con politics, as well as a Lynchian fable of sexual repression. "(SEA is) at once a black slapstick comedy, a twisted horror tale, a stylish period piece and a biting religious satire," wrote Fangoria.

Originally shot in 2006-2007, Sea of Dust suffered post-production delays attributable to the illness of star Ingrid Pitt, which caused extensive structural revisions (detailed in the Region 1 DVD commentary). Regardless, the film obtained strong festival response, winning both the Rhode Island International Film Festival and Fright Night Film Fest, and opening Fangoria's Trinity of Terrors in Las Vegas in 2009.

Sea of Dust also gained the support of cult directors Jean Rollin and Ken Russell, no strangers to the incorporation of surreal elements into a horror context, which boosted the film's standing.

In August 2010, Sea of Dust was released in North America by Cinema Epoch DVD. This package included three trailers, all of which would be banned when the film went to cable TV. Despite the film's satiric intent, the trailers were deemed "too bloody" for mass consumption, as was a fourth that had been created as a tribute to Ingrid Pitt (who died in November 2010).

The same month marked the publication of the McFarland Press book, Ingrid Pitt, Queen of Horror, by Bobb Cotter. Mr. Cotter called Sea of Dust "one of the strongest anti-intolerance statements made in recent film history" and one of Ingrid Pitt's "best latter-day showcases".

== Reception ==
Sea of Dust garnered largely positive reviews in the horror press upon its initial release. Rue Morgue Magazine called the film: “Truly original…Several British period fright flicks feature religious zealotry (Witchfinder General and The Devils for starters), but SEA OF DUST may be the most mind-bending one yet. Literally!" Nathaniel Thompson, editor of the four volume DVD Delirium series, wrote: "Sea of Dust ambitiously sets its sights on a complex, mindbending story about the extremities of moral conviction framed like a nasty fairy tale...sort of a clash between The Saragossa Manuscript and Kill, Baby, Kill with a hefty dose of gore." Bloody-Disgusting also commented upon the film's surrealist touches: “It’s like David Lynch and Hammer Horror got together, did a bunch of ecstasy and read the Bible. Nothing else in modern horror looks or feels like it. Gore hounds will be pleasantly surprised by the sheer amount of excess." Michael Den Boer of 10,000 Bullets called the film: “First rate. It is refreshing to finally come across a horror film that goes against the grain. SEA OF DUST is a metaphysical horror film that takes a few viewings to fully digest."

Additionally, Sea of Dust performed admirably on the film festival circuit. Sea of Dust won the "Best Picture Grand Prize" at the 2008 Rhode Island International Horror Film Festival. In 2009, Sea of Dust won the "Best of the Fest" at Louisville's Fright Night Film Fest. The film also opened the Fangoria Trinity of Terrors Film Festival in October of that year.

Issues with the film's distribution resulted in its producers withdrawing Sea of Dust from public exhibition thereafter. Since 2009, has only been screened publicly on two occasions. In each, the film has received additional awards. In 2013, Sea of Dust was projected at Parafest at the Sands Hotel & Casino in Bethlehem, where it won the "Audience Choice Best Feature Award" and "Best Poster Award." The latter provided long overdue recognition for multi-media artist Stephen Romano, whose projects included the illustrated Shock Festival novel and the "Incident On and Off a Mountain Road" episode of Showtime’s Emmy Award-winning Masters of Horror cable series (directed by Don Coscarelli).

In 2014, Sea of Dust appeared at the Macabre Faire Film Festival in Long Island, New York where it again received the "Audience Choice Best Feature Award" as well as the "Best Cinematography Award."
