= James Cunningham (director) =

New Zealand film director and animator (born 1973)

James Cunningham (born 1973) is a New Zealand film director and animator. He has directed twelve award-winning short films. He is based in Auckland, New Zealand.

== Career ==
James was senior lecturer at Media Design School, an animation and visual effects new media school in New Zealand, where he produced and directed short films with his students. Prior to that he was head of 3D at Digital Post working on visual effects for local and international TV commercials, and he was a technical director on The Lord of the Rings at Weta Digital. He has a Bachelor of Fine Arts in photography and a Master of Fine Arts in digital animation from Elam School of Fine Arts (Auckland, New Zealand).

== Films ==
Accidents, Blunders and Calamities is an ABC of animals destroyed because of the ignorance of humans told with a high volume of creative CGI vignettes. It has played at SXSW, Clermont Ferrand, Annecy, Siggraph, ITFS, and Won Best Editor and the People's Choice aware at Show Me Shorts (NZ)

Over the Moon is a feminist space adventure about kick-ass comic book heroine Connie Radar, as she defends the Moon from gun-toting American Astronauts and attempts to prevent the first Moon landing. It won the Jury Prize at Siggraph Asia 2014

Shelved is about two slacker robots who discover they are being replaced by humans. It premièred at SXSW and played at over 25 international festivals. It won Best Animation at NYShorts and Online Audience Award at Palm Springs Shorts Fest.

Dr Grordbort Present: The Deadliest Game is a live action short film with exorbitant amounts of CGI environments and creatures. It is based on the wild world created by Greg Broadmore.

Das Tub is a live action/VFX short film – a submarine film of domestic proportions. It won Best Short Short at Aspen Shorts Fest 2011, and Best Director at the Honolulu Film Awards 2011.

Poppy is a CGI drama film set in World War I. It premiered at Telluride in 2009 and won the Grand Jury Prize at SIGGRAPH in Los Angeles 2010, and Best in Show at SIGGRAPH Asia in Seoul 2010. It also screened at Melbourne International Film Festival 2010, Hollyshorts 2010, Palm Springs 2010, SXSW 2010, Stuttgart's ITFS Animation Festival 2010. Back in New Zealand it won Best Technical Contribution at the Qantas Film Awards, and at Show Me Shorts it won Director, Editor and Jury Prize.

Infection competed at Cannes International Film Festival 2000, Sundance Film Festival 2001 and 20 other international Film Festivals. Infection is the most successful short ever made by the New Zealand Film Commission in terms of sales and A-List Festival selection.

Delf was selected for the Saatchi & Saatchi new directors Global showcase in 2000 and won numerous awards. Delf is an acronym for digitally engineered life forms.

Blinder was released theatrically in New Zealand with In the Company of Men and also Godzilla.

The Unlikeliest Hero, written by Barbara Connell, which won the INSITE Award at the Adelaide Film Festival in 2011, was planned to be made by Cunningham in an official Australia/New Zealand co-production, with completion of the film timed to coincide with the 100-year commemorations of ANZAC Day. However, as of September 2020 it was last reported as being pitched as an animated film at the Annecy International Animation Film Festival in 2015.

== Filmography ==
=== Director ===
- The Dragon's Scale (2016): writer, director, producer
- Accidents, Blunders and Calamities (2015): writer, director, producer
- Over the Moon (2014): director, producer
- Shelved (2013): director, producer
- Dr Grordbort Present: The Deadliest Game (2011): director, editor, producer
- Rotting Hill (2011): director, editor, producer
- First Contact (2010): director, editor, producer
- Das Tub (2010): director, editor, producer
- Time for Change (2010): director, editor, producer
- Slightly Fishy (2009): director, editor, producer
- Poppy (2009): director
- Infection (2000): writer, director
- Blinder (1998): writer, director
- Delf (1997): writer, director

=== Music Videos ===
- Drive, Strawpeople (2000): director
- It's Not Enough, Strawpeople (2000): director
- Signals, elle ven (2004): director
