= Graveyard Alive =

2003 film by Elza Kephart

Graveyard Alive: A Zombie Nurse in Love
- United States theatrical poster
- Directed by: Elza Kephart
- Screenplay by: Elza Kephart (II)
- Produced by: Elza Kephart; Patricia Gomez; Andrea Stark
- Starring: Anne Day-Jones; Samantha Slan
- Cinematography: John Ashmore
- Release date: August 2, 2003
- Running time: 82 minutes
- Country: Canada
- Language: English

Graveyard Alive: A Zombie Nurse in Love, is an independent zombie horror comedy directed by Elza Kephart. The film is in black and white and it is dubbed. The film, had its world premiere at the 2003 Fantasia festival in Montreal, Canada, and its U.S. premier at the 2004 Slamdance festival in Park City, Utah where it won best Cinematography. The film was produced by Bastard Amber Productions, and it was filmed in Montreal, Quebec, Canada. The film was featured in Nightmare in Canada: Canadian Horror on Film (2004) (Doc)

== Synopsis ==
Patsy Powers (Day-Jones) is a homely nurse who pines for handsome Dr. Dox (Gerhardt). Unfortunately for Patsy, the well-favoured physician only has eyes for pretty Goodie Tueshuez (Slan) - a jealous-minded nurse obsessed with popularity.

When a foul-smelling woodsman is admitted to the hospital with an axe imbedded in his forehead, the rest of the nurse staff runs for cover as kindly Patsy and the injured worker form a warm bond. Later, after Patsy and the rugged lumberjack share a kiss, the smitten nurse is thrown off guard when her new beau reflexively sinks his teeth into her flesh. As Patsy runs off to bandage her wound, Eastern European doctor-turned-janitor Kapotski recognizes the woodsman as a zombie and ends the man's suffering with a stake through the head.

In the days that follow, Patsy's body is gradually taken over by the zombie virus. Not only does the transformation adversely affect Patsy's eating habits, it instills her with a newfound confidence that quickly catches the eye of Dr. Dox as well. Perplexed by her mousy co-worker's sudden transformation and determined to keep Dr. Dox for herself, the scheming Goody soon sets out to uncover the secret of Patsy's rising popularity. Now, as Patsy struggles to stay well fed and Dr. Dox grows increasingly inpatient with Goodie's unpalatable jealousy, the stage is set for a romance fueled by enough passion to transcend life and death.

== Cast ==
- Anne Day-Jones - Patsy Powers
- Karl Gerhardt - Dr. Dox
- Samantha Slan - Goodie Tueshuze
- Eric Kendric - Woodcutter
- Roland Laroche - Kapotski
- Roger Guetta - Hospital Administrator

== Production credits ==
- Annie MacDonald - Executive Producer
- Elza Kephart - Producer
- Patricia Gomez - Producer
- Andrea Stark - Producer
- Charles Jodoin-Keaton - Co-Producer
- Jessica Andrews - Associate Producer
- John Ashmore - Cinematographer

== Awards ==
Kodak Vision Award for Best Cinematography at the 2004 Slamdance film festival

Nominated at the 2005 Cinevagas B-Movie film festival for:

- Best B Movie
- Best Director
- Best Screenplay
- Karl Gerhardt for best actor
- Anne Day-Jones for best actress
- Samantha Slan for best supporting actress
- Martin Pelland for best music score
- John Ashmore for best cinematography
- Caroline Meyer & Sarah Hagan for best set design
- Stephanie Olivier for best editing
