= Be My Cat: A Film for Anne =

2015 Romanian horror film by Adrian Țofei

- Official poster
- Directed by: Adrian Țofei
- Written by: Adrian Țofei
- Produced by: Adrian Țofei
- Starring: Adrian Țofei; Sonia Teodoriu; Florentina Hariton; Alexandra Stroe
- Cinematography: Adrian Țofei
- Edited by: Adrian Țofei
- Distributed by: Terror Films
- Release dates: March 1, 2015 (Fantasporto); April 27, 2018 (streaming)
- Running time: 87 minutes
- Country: Romania
- Languages: English; Romanian

Be My Cat: A Film for Anne is a 2015 English-language Romanian found footage psychological horror film directed, produced, written, and starring Adrian Țofei. It follows an aspiring filmmaker who goes to extreme lengths to convince the actress Anne Hathaway to star in his film. Be My Cat is Țofei's first film, and is part of a trilogy which also includes We Put the World to Sleep and Pure. (Note: Attributed to multiple references:)

Be My Cat premiered at film festivals in 2015, winning Best Film at the 2015 A Night of Horror Film Festival in Sydney. In 2016, it won Best Actor for Țofei at the Nashville Film Festival and the Hamilton Film Festival. (Note: Attributed to multiple references:) It was released commercially by Terror Films in 2018 and has gained a cult following.

== Plot ==
Adrian, an aspiring Romanian actor and filmmaker, plans to convince American actress Anne Hathaway, with whom he is obsessed, to come to Romania and star alongside him in his upcoming film, Be My Cat, inspired by her portrayal of Catwoman in The Dark Knight Rises. Adrian locates three local actresses to use to shoot demo scenes to send to Anne as proof of his filmmaking and acting skills, though he lies and tells the actresses he is making a movie.

The first actress, Sonia, meets Adrian at an abandoned house down the street from where he stays with his mother. He explains that Be My Cat is about a stalker obsessed with an actress, and as filming begins, the lines start to blur between the real Adrian and his character. Adrian begins shooting a scene with Sonia that doubles as a frustrating acting exercise. Sonia eventually calls the police, but Adrian explains to them that it was a misunderstanding and convinces Sonia to shoot another scene at night. While filming a scene in which the stalker uses chloroform to abduct the actress, Adrian uses real chloroform and knocks Sonia out.

After taking Sonia to his bedroom, Adrian undresses her and puts her in a catsuit. Speaking to the camera, he promises Anne that he would never do this in real life and is only acting in character, and that he is worthy of Anne in every way, suggesting that his intentions for Anne may be more than artistic. Adrian stays the night beside the unconscious Sonia. When she wakes up frightened, he insists that she must be sacrificed for her art before choking her to death and hiding her body in the basement.

While going to meet his second actress, Adrian explains that he was bullied in the past; due to this, he dislikes boys and dogs for their meanness, but likes girls and cats due to their sweetness and innocence. He also explains that the character in his film seeks to turn the actress character into a surrogate of his cat that he accidentally killed, based on how Adrian accidentally killed his own cat as a child. Incidentally, he chances upon a dead cat on the side of the road.

Upon meeting the second actress, Flory, Adrian discovers that the photos she had sent him of herself were outdated. Displeased with her age and weight, Adrian berates her. Flory offers him sexual favors in exchange for letting her be in the movie, but he refuses.

Adrian agrees to allow Flory to stay as they pick up the third actress, Alexandra. Adrian asks Alexandra to wait upstairs, then ties up Flory in the basement and uses a kitchen knife to remove fat from her body in an attempt to make her thinner. Two neighbors arrive to investigate after hearing Flory's screams, but Adrian convinces them that they are merely filming a horror movie. Later that night, Adrian returns with a catsuit, intending for Flory to wear it, but is surprised to find her dead from blood loss. Acknowledging that he has completely disappeared into his character, he feels that he has already proved his talents to Anne and thus can send Alexandra home.

When Alexandra finds Flory's body, Adrian reluctantly deliberates killing Alexandra, knowing she will likely report him to the police. She briefly tries to escape, but ultimately tries to reason with Adrian. He finds himself somewhat attracted to Alexandra due to her resemblance to Anne, but assures Anne that he only loves her. Using this to her advantage, Alexandra encourages him to travel to Hollywood so he can profess his feelings for Anne in person. Adrian is initially apprehensive due to his fear of leaving his hometown, but relents when Alexandra excites him with the prospect of marrying and having children with Anne. He agrees to let her live on the condition that she wait in the basement for thirty minutes, giving him time to escape and leave for Hollywood. Alexandra wishes him luck, and an overjoyed Adrian, deciding that he does not need to make a movie after all since the movie was just a means to be with Anne, turns off the camera.

== Cast ==
- Adrian Țofei as Adrian
- Sonia Teodoriu as Sonia
- Florentina Hariton as Flory
- Alexandra Stroe as Alexandra

== Production ==
The character played by Țofei in the movie was developed over the course of 5 years. It started as a 15-minute monologue in a theatre-dance show in college, which Țofei transformed into a 50-minute one-man show called The Monster before adapting the character for the movie. A year prior to filming, Țofei moved to his hometown and began to experience some of the circumstances that surround his character's life.

Țofei selected Anne Hathaway to be his character's obsession in the movie after watching her performances in Les Misérables and The Dark Knight Rises in 2012. He had wanted the object of his character's affection to be a world-renowned celebrity so audiences everywhere would connect to the film, and for her to be connected to cats in some way, since the role was inspired by a character Țofei played in a one-man show that had issues with cats. Țofei had been genuinely impressed with her performance in Les Misérables, and realized that his character in the movie could become obsessed with her Catwoman role in The Dark Knight Rises.

Țofei, who came from a background in method acting and theatre (Ion Cojar's method), partially improvised the movie in his hometown in Romania on a limited budget as director, producer, writer, lead actor, editor, cinematographer and most other jobs usually performed by a film crew. He never used a camera before in his life, had no crew present during shootings other than him and the actresses, partially lived in character, met the actresses for the first time in character with the camera on, and kept only first takes in the final cut. Filming was preceded by months of preparation via emails and phone calls between Țofei and the three actresses.

A language switch was used during filming to ensure the safety of everyone involved: speaking English meant everyone was interacting in character, and speaking Romanian meant everyone returned to being themselves (with a few exceptions when the characters had to speak Romanian). This also allowed the actors to freely experiment with improvisation without confusion. A practical example was when actress Sonia Teodoriu, upon being directed by Țofei to improvise something extreme, unexpectedly called the police for real during one scene, surprising Țofei both in and out of character. The language rule helped Țofei understand that Teodoriu called the police in character, and not on him personally.

Țofei's filmmaking method consisted of working for months on an alternative psychological reality for the actors, including himself, partially living in character, so that when they started improvising, he mainly needed to record the unfolding events and to make sure the improvisation went in the right direction. The script mostly consisted of plot points. Adrian shot 25 hours of footage guerrilla style, then watched the footage like a documentary filmmaker would and created the details of the story in post-production during the editing process.

Țofei ensured his character refrained from committing any sexual crimes, partially because he believed it would be too grotesque and deter audiences. Țofei also wanted to emphasize that his character paradoxically has a sort of child-like innocence, and that he is so infatuated with Anne Hathaway that he would not even think about touching another woman.

== Release ==
=== Festival release ===
Be My Cat: A Film for Anne had its world premiere on March 1 at the 2015 Fantasporto International Film Festival in Portugal in its initial 109 minutes version, and then the Romanian premiere at the 2015 Transilvania International Film Festival.

The movie's 87 minutes cut premiered at the 2015 Dracula Film Festival in Romania. More festival premieres followed at the 2015 A Night of Horror International Film Festival in Sydney (Australian premiere), the 2016 Nashville Film Festival (North American premiere), 2016 Fright Nights in Vienna (Austrian premiere), 2016 On Vous Ment! Mockumentary Festival (French premiere), 2016 TromaDance in New York City (East Coast Premiere), 2016 Hamilton Film Festival (Canadian premiere), 2016 Toronto Indie Horror Fest (Toronto premiere) and 2016 Other Worlds Austin (Texas premiere).

=== Home media ===
Țofei initially released Be My Cat on Vimeo On Demand in 2016, on Amazon Video in 2017, and, for a limited time, on DVD via Amazon. Cult distributor TetroVideo gave the film a limited DVD release with French and Italian subtitles in 2020, and Țofei later re-released it worldwide on DVD via Amazon. (Note: Attributed to multiple references:)

Terror Films acquired the film's worldwide digital rights in 2017 and gave it a wider release in 2018 on Amazon Prime, iTunes, Google Play, Microsoft / Xbox, Vudu, and later on Steam, Screambox, Tubi and Roku. In 2020 Terror Films partnered with Cinedigm to expand the release, including on YouTube. In 2024, Be My Cat became available on the found footage platform Found TV. (Note: Attributed to multiple references:)

== Reception ==
=== Critical response ===
On the review aggregator Rotten Tomatoes, Be My Cat has an 89% critical approval rating based on nine reviews. IndieWire has described it as a cult film and "a sublimely meta hidden gem that is nothing short of a nonstop nightmare ... a chilling character study and a dazzling debut for Țofei". Richard Whittaker of The Austin Chronicle called the film "terrifying" and "a jaw-dropping character study of a murderer, made all the more grueling and transfixing because of Țofei's performance ... Țofei's pointed decision to avoid overt gore, instead concentrating on the interactions, makes the film something akin to a modern Peeping Tom."

Anton Bitel of Little White Lies described Be My Cat as "a prime example of meta-cinema, endlessly blurring the line between behind-the-scenes reality and onscreen fantasy, between documentary and fiction, while also repeatedly commenting on the process of its own making. The results are an unnerving study in cinephilia and erotomania, falling somewhere between Rémy Belvaux's Man Bites Dog and Patrick Brice’s Creep." Matt Molgaard of Blumhouse Productions said the film "scared the shit out of [him]."

Slash/Film said that “Be My Cat is insidiously terrifying and Țofei is magnetic on screen. Even as Adrian's world grows darker and more unhinged, you can't avert your eyes.”

Dread Central gave the movie 4 stars and wrote that "Be My Cat takes meta-filmmaking to mind-bending levels and plays out like an arthouse snuff film. Simply calling it unique is an understatement. What we have here is potentially revolutionary and, like the most impactful examples of uncompromising art, potentially dangerous. The line between fact and fiction has never been so terrifyingly and brilliantly blurred."

Paste Magazine wrote that the movie is "a daring and effective example of meta-cinema, as Tofei plays a terrifyingly convincing murderer living with his mother, played by his actual mother. A deeply troubled, sheltered man whose misogyny and perversion combine to create a portrait of passion and obsession, one that is both terrifying yet deeply fascinating."

28DLA gave it 4 stars, calling it a "disturbing found footage masterpiece" and added that "the authenticity comes from exceptionally strong performances by an excellent cast. Sonia Teodoriu, Florentina Hariton, Alexandra Stroe and Adrian Țofei are so convincing that, at times, it's uncomfortable to watch."

Dean Bertram from A Night of Horror described Be My Cat as "the most revolutionary addition to the found footage genre since The Blair Witch Project and infinitely more convincing and frightening" and Lloyd Kaufman from TromaDance wrote that it's "a new masterpiece in horror". Jed Shepherd (co-writer of Host) said that “When it comes to underrated/under-appreciated horror movies that are actually very good, few have been more overlooked than the new found footage classic Be My Cat: A Film for Anne. The line between fiction and reality is so effectively blurred, I was watching my front door for a SWAT team to burst through and taser me for watching something I shouldn't.”

Audiences Everywhere named it "dangerous and progressive" and added that "the film is fascinating, challenging and essential for the evolution of found footage horror." Mondo Exploito wrote that it "totally transcends the trappings of the found footage subgenre to create a truly unique experience that will be talked about for years to come." Cinehouse called it a "cinematic miracle".

Found Footage Critic called Be My Cat "a near perfect horror/thriller found footage film that sets itself apart in acting, cinematography, plot, tone, execution and production value". The website described the acting of Țofei and the supporting cast as "nothing short of exceptional".

Țofei received praise for his acting from various critics. Artsploitation said that Țofei did "the most believable movie psychopath since Norman Bates." Severed Cinema wrote that Be My Cat is "expertly acted" and called it "horror's answer to the Dogma 95 filmmaking ideals".

The movie also received negative and mixed reviews, Laura Clifford from Reeling Reviews gave the movie a rotten C+ score and said that it "may hold few surprises and drags through much of its run time, but it's worth checking out for the filmmaker's seriously deranged performance", suggesting a crossover between Angst and My Date with Drew.

=== Lists ===
- Blumhouse: "A New Wave of Intelligent Found Footage: 5 Films You Need to See"
- Rotten Tomatoes: "Top 100 Best Found Footage Movies"
- IndieWire:
  - "The 50 Best Indie Horror Movies to Stream"
  - "The 15 Best Found Footage Movies"
- Dread Central:
  - "Top 5 Best Horror Films of 2016"
  - "The Found Footage Flicks That Will Restore Your Belief in Found Footage"
  - "7 Freaky Found Footage Movies From Around The World"
- Vulture: "The 25 Best Found-Footage Horror Movies"
- Screen Rant: "20 Best Found Footage Horror Movies"
- Collider: "The 15 Best International Found Footage Movies"
- Film Threat: "7 Recent European Horror Films Worth Watching"
- WhatCulture:
  - "10 Seriously Messed Up Psychological Horror Movies"
  - "10 Extreme Horror Movies That Try To Break Their Audience"
  - "12 Underrated Found Footage Horror Movies"
- Slash/Film: "The 25 Scariest Found Footage Horror Movies"
- Paste Magazine: "The 35 Best Found Footage Horror Movies"
- YardBarker: "The 20 Best Found Footage Horror Films"
- MovieWeb: "20 Realistic Horror Movies that Are Hard to Watch"
- We Got This Covered: "10 Horror Films Perfect for Analog Horror Fans"
- Audiences Everywhere: "The 50 Best Horror Movies of the 2000s"
- Creepy Catalog: "30 Scariest Movies of All Time"
- PopHorror: "5 Must-See Indie Horror Performances of the Decade So Far"

=== Awards and nominations ===
Event (year)	Award	Recipient	Result	Ref.
A Night of Horror International Film Festival (2015)	Best Film	Adrian Țofei	Won	
A Night of Horror International Film Festival (2015)	Best Director	Adrian Țofei	Nominated	
A Night of Horror International Film Festival (2015)	Best Male Performance	Adrian Țofei	Nominated	
A Night of Horror International Film Festival (2015)	Best Female Performance	Alexandra Stroe	Nominated	
Nashville Film Festival (2016)	Grand Jury Prize	Adrian Țofei	Nominated	
Nashville Film Festival (2016)	Special Jury Prize for Best Actor	Adrian Țofei	Won	
Fantasporto International Film Festival (2015)	Best Film	Adrian Țofei	Nominated	
Transilvania International Film Festival (2015)	Best Romanian Feature Film	Adrian Țofei	Nominated	
Hamilton Film Festival (2016)	Best Actor	Adrian Țofei	Won	
Anchorage International Film Festival (2018)	Best Narrative Feature	Adrian Țofei	Nominated	
Nightmares Film Festival (2018)	Best Thriller Feature	Adrian Țofei	Nominated	
Nightmares Film Festival (2018)	Best Actor in a Feature	Adrian Țofei	Nominated	

== Influence and legacy ==
Actor Dacre Montgomery based his character in the 2026 horror movie Faces of Death on the main character played by Adrian Țofei in Be My Cat: A Film for Anne. Dacre called Be My Cat the scariest movie he has ever seen.

In 2022, Be My Cat: A Film for Anne was named by IndieWire one of "the 50 best indie horror movies" and one of "the 15 best found footage movies". In 2024, Vulture named it one of the "25 best found footage horror movies".

== See also ==
- List of cult films
- List of films featuring fictional films
- List of films featuring psychopaths and sociopaths
