= A Night of Horror International Film Festival =

Genre film festival in the US (previously in Australia)

- ANOH Logo
- Location: Eau Claire, Wisconsin, US
- Founded: 2006
- Founded by: Dean Bertram
- Most recent: 2024
- Directors: Dean Bertram
- Festival date: Annually in March
- Language: English, International
- Website: anightofhorror.com

A Night of Horror International Film Festival (ANOH) is a genre film festival that was based in Sydney, Australia from 2006 to 2023, and from 2024 onwards takes place annually in Eau Claire, Wisconsin, United States, premiering feature and short films in the horror and horror-related genres.

The event was considered to be Australia's premiere horror film festival, being named twice as one of Dread Central's Best Horror Festivals in the World in 2022 and 2021. In his monthly column in Encore Magazine, columnist Harvey Shore referred to ANOH as "Australia's first horror film festival that recognizes the past and gives the horror genre a platform for the future." In an article in Sydney's Drum Media magazine, journalist Liz Guiffre refers to it as "a one of a kind in our parts".

After relocation to the United States, it has continued to be cited as one of the world's top 100 most important genre festivals.

== Festival history ==
The festival was founded in 2006 by Dean Bertram, Lisa Mitchell and Grant Bertram. It was originally a short film festival, but has since expanded to include feature films and horror themed music videos. As the festival began to run for more days, "A Night of Horror" became actually something of a misnomer (the 2008 edition ran for ten days and nights). The principal screening venue for the 2008 festival was the Dendy Newtown Cinema. Additional special events included a horror filmmaking forum, a zombie walk, and a number of horror-themed parties.

In addition to the principal annual event in Sydney, a "best of" program of films from the festival tours within Australia and internationally. Some of these screenings take place at other festivals under the "A Night of Horror" banner, and have included programs at: It Came From Lake Michigan Film Festival, Weekend de la Peur, and Revelation Perth International Film Festival.

In 2007, ANOH also programmed a special selection of Canadian produced horror films for Possible Worlds: Sydney's Canadian Film Festival (which took place at the Chauvel Cinema, Paddington).

On 2 June 2008, ANOH announced its call for entries for the 2009 festival, which was scheduled for 25 March to 3 April 2009, accepting films in several different categories, including: feature films, short films, animations, films inspired by the writings of H. P. Lovecraft, and horror-themed music videos. It has also introduced a screenplay competition to take place in conjunction with the 2009 festival, calling for unproduced feature length and short horror scripts.

== Awards ==
The festival is competitive and films compete for several awards and prizes. A panel of judges decide the winners.

2009 judges included: Antony I. Ginnane (IFM World Releasing, SPAA), Jon Dalgaard (International Coordinator, Lionsgate), Jason Di Rosso (ABC Radio National Movietime), Lewis Alsamari (actor United 93, Green Zone, and writer).

Other years' judges have included film author and curator Jack Sargeant, People magazine editor Martin Vine, television and radio personalities Jaimie Leonarder and Aspasia Leonarder, and FBi Radio presenter and journalist Chris Ruhle.

2007 Winning films:

- Best of Fest: The Ancient Rite of Corey McGillis (AUS)
- Best Film: Happy Birthday 2 You (ESP)
- Best Animation: The Tell Tale Heart (LUX/ESP/USA)
- Best Lovecraft Film: From Beyond (USA)
- Best Zombie Film: Love is a Shotgun (AUS)
- Best Director: Paul Campion, Night of the Hell Hamsters (UK/NZ)
- Best Performance: Emma Caulfield, Hollow (USA)
- Best Scream Queen: Kaja Trøa, The New Life (AUS)
- Best Special Effects: Stuart Rowsell, The Ancient Rite of Corey McGillis (AUS)
- Best Score: Milan Rusko, Nazdravicko! (SVK)

2008 Winning Films:

- Best Film: Brain Dead (USA)
- Best Foreign Film: La Antena (ARG)
- Best Short Film: Pumpkin Hell (USA)
- Best Australian Film: When Sally Met Frank (AUS)
- Best Lovecraft Film: The Call of Cthulhu (USA)
- Best Animation: Egg Ghost (KOR/USA)
- Best Music Video: Torture Device, featuring Dawn of Ashes (USA)
- Best Director: Paco Limon, (Doctor Infierno) (ESP)
- Best Performance: Sammi Davis, The Double Born (USA)
- Best Scream Queen: Tess McVicker, Brain Dead (USA)
- Best Special Make-Up Effects: Brain Dead (USA)
- Best Special Visual Effects: Eel Girl (NZ/UK)
- Directors' Choice Award (Best Feature Film): Murder Loves Killers Too (USA)
- Directors' Choice Award (Best Short Film): Kirksdale (USA)

2009 Winning Films:

- Best Film: Splinter (USA)
- Best Foreign Language Film: No Morire Sola (I'll Never Die Alone) (ARG)
- Best Australian Film: I Know How Many Runs You Scored Last Summer (AUS)
- Best Director: Adrián García Bogliano (I'll Never Die Alone) (ARG)
- Best Australian Director: Ursula Dabrowsky (Family Demons) (AUS)
- Best Female Performance: Olga Fedori (Mum & Dad) (UK)
- Best Male Performance: Shea Whigham (Splinter) (USA)
- Best Special Effects: Splinter (USA)
- Best Special Effects (Short Film): Treevenge (CAN)
- Best Short Film: Una Storia Di Lupi (A Wolf's Tale) (ITA)
- Best Short Animation: The Facts in the Case of Mister Hollow (CAN)
- Best Lovecraft Film: AM 1200 (USA)
- Best Short Australian Film: A Break in the Monotony (AUS)
- Best Music Video: More Control - The Heist and the Accomplice (Dir: Steve Daniels) (USA)
- Directors' Choice (BEST FEATURE): Reel Zombies (CAN)
- Directors' Choice (BEST SHORT): Allure (USA)
- Independent Spirit Award (FEATURE FILM): Finale (USA)
- Independent Spirit Award (SHORT): The Red Hours (CAN)
- Independent Spirit Award (AUSTRALIA): Taber Corn (AUS)
- Feature Screenplay Winners:
  - 1st - Terminal - (Paul Campion & Elisabeth Pinto)
  - 2nd - Children of the Night - (Harry Basil)
  - 3rd - Footage - (Duncan Samarasinghe)
- Short Screenplay Winners:
  - 1st - Brother Moose's Broken Shorts - (A.J. Mitchler)
  - 2nd - Fragments of Normal - (Gwyn Duffy)
  - 3rd - Mr. Roach - (Franck Zuanic)

== See also ==
- List of fantastic and horror film festivals
