= Naughty List (disambiguation) =

"Naughty List" is a song by Liam Payne and Dixie D'Amelio.

Naughty List or The Naughty List may also refer to:

== Naughty List ==
- "Naughty List", a song by Meghan Trainor from A Very Trainor Christmas
- "Naughty List", a song by Chawarin Perdpiriyawong
- "Naughty List", a song by Forever in Your Mind
- "Naughty List", a song by Frock Destroyers
- "Naughty List", a song by Marie Osmond
- "Naughty List", a song by Phil Vassar
- Naughty List, an album by Mitchell Tenpenny
- Naughty List (Holiday Jingles 2017), an EP by Anybody Killa

== The Naughty List ==
- The Naughty List, a 2016 British comedy short film
- "The Naughty List", an episode of American Horror Stories
- "The Naughty List", a two-part episode of My Parents Are Aliens
