= Horrorscope =

Horrorscope may refer to:

- Horrorscope (Eve 6 album)
- Horrorscope (Overkill album)
- HorrorScope (webzine), an Australian horror fiction news and review webzine
- Horrorscope, an EP by Primal Fear
- Horrorscope, a 1992 novel by Nicholas Adams, pseudonym of John Peel (writer)
- Horrorscope, a 1993 novel by Derek Lambert

== See also ==
- Horoscope
