= Paul Campion (film director) =

English-New Zealand film director and screenwriter

Paul Campion is an English/New Zealand film director, and screenwriter.

== Life and career ==
Born in England, Campion studied technical illustration at Bournemouth and Poole College of Art and Design. He began his career as a freelance illustrator and was represented by Folio Artists Agents in London. He created book cover illustrations for authors such as Wilbur Smith and Ben Elton.

In 1999 he completed a Master's degree in Computer Animation at Bournemouth University, and then moved to New Zealand where he worked on Peter Jackson's The Lord of the Rings film trilogy, as a texture painter, creating digital textures for the Balrog, Mûmakil, Fellbeast, and Shelob.

He then worked as a matte painter on Sin City, Constantine, as a texture painter on The Waterhorse and the remake of The Dambusters, and as a concept artist on X-Men: The Last Stand, Dorian Gray, Clash of the Titans, and The Chronicles of Narnia: The Voyage of the Dawn Treader.

== Short films ==
In 2006 Campion directed his first short film, the black comedy horror Night of the Hell Hamsters. In 2008 he followed this up with the short science fiction horror film Eel Girl, featuring special makeup effects by Weta Workshop. In 2016 Campion directed his third short film The Naughty List, based on a short story by author Brian Keene.

== Feature films ==
In 2010 he wrote and directed his first feature film The Devil's Rock, co-written with Paul Finch and Brett Ihaka. Set in the Channel Islands during WW2, it tells the story of two New Zealand commandos who uncover a Nazi plot to summon up a demon, using a book of black magic.

== Planned feature films ==
- Dark Hollow is a planned feature film based on the novel "Dark Hollow" by US author Brian Keene.
- Kill Whitey is a planned feature film based on the novel "Kill Whitey" by US author Brian Keene.
- Scorpion Raiders is a planned World War 2 feature film based on the true story of the Long Range Desert Group's Barce raid (Operation Caravan).
- Voodoo Dawn is a zombie feature film previously called "Lore of the Jungle", set in London, written by Paul Finch. Campion described the film as "set in London and involves black magic and re-animated corpses and it's designed to be a very fun entertaining Evil Dead 2/Dusk Till Dawn style film."

== Filmography ==
Year	Film	Type	Credit	Notes
2005	Night of the Hell Hamsters	Short	Director, writer	Co-wrote with Mike Roseingrave and Hadyn Green
2008	Eel Girl	Short	Director, writer	Produced by Elisabeth Pinto and Jennifer Scheer
2011	The Devil's Rock	Feature	Director, writer	Co-wrote with Paul Finch and Brett Ihaka
2016	The Naughty List	Short	Director, writer, producer	Based on a short story by Brian Keene
2019	Back in Business	Short	Director, Producer	Written by Barri Costello

== Awards and nominations ==
- Night of the Hell Hamsters (2007)
  - A Night of Horror International Film Festival – Best Director
  - Vine Short Film Festival – Best Horror Film
  - Zompire: The Undead Film Festival — Audience Favourite
  - Big Mountain Short Film Festival – Audience Favourite
  - Tabloid Witch Awards – Honorable Mention
  - Terror Film Festival – Best Horror Short Film (nominated)
- Eel Girl (2008)
  - Brest European Short Film Festival – Canal+ Cocotte Minute
  - Court Metrange Film Festival – Grand Prix
  - H.P. Lovecraft Film Festival – Best Short Film and Best Comedy
  - Tabloid Witch Awards – Honorable Mention
  - Rushes Soho Shorts Film Festival – Best Short Film (nominated)
  - Dark Carnival Film Festival – Best Short Film (nominated)
- The Naughty List (2016)
  - One-Reeler Short Film Competition – Award of Excellence
  - Best Comedy Short Film – The Austin Comedy Short Film Festival, 2017 (nominated)
  - Best Screenplay – Short Film – GenreBlast Film Festival, 2017 (nominated)
  - Funniest Short Film – GenreBlast Film Festival, 2017 (nominated)
  - Best Overall Short Film – GenreBlast Film Festival, 2017 (nominated)
