= The Way Through the Woods (McCormack novel) =

2011 novel by Una McCormack

- Author: Una McCormack
- Series: Doctor Who book: New Series Adventures
- Release number: 44
- Subject: Featuring: Eleventh Doctor; Amy Pond; Rory Williams
- Set in: Period between "Day of the Moon" and "The God Complex"
- Publisher: BBC Books
- Publication date: 28 April 2011
- Pages: 241
- ISBN: 978-1-849-90237-3
- Preceded by: Dead of Winter
- Followed by: Hunter's Moon

The Way Through the Woods is a book in the Doctor Who New Series Adventures series, featuring the Eleventh Doctor, Amy Pond and Rory Williams.

== Plot ==
For thousands of years, the inhabitants of Foxton have avoided Swallow Woods, but approximately every fifty years a number of people go into the woods and never come out. The Doctor realises this is the result of a spatial distortion caused by a crashed spaceship and discovers that a week after the last disappearances the entire area will be destroyed and replaced with a lake. He has Rory befriend Emily Bostock shortly before she disappeared in 1917 so he can accompany her into the woods. He and Amy will then follow one of three young women who were the last to disappear, approximately a hundred years later, and both groups will activate a homing device on finding the ship so they can get a bearing on its position. Unfortunately, when Rory and Emily enter the woods and are taken aboard the spaceship, Rory loses his memory and forgets to activate the device. Furthermore, Detective Inspector Gordon Galloway, who is investigating the disappearances of Laura Brown and Vicky Caine, becomes suspicious of the Doctor's behaviour and arrests him. With no other option, Amy elects to accompany the third woman, Jess Ashcroft, into the woods.

Amy and Jess find Vicky alone in a clearing which they keep being led back to whichever way they go. A humanoid fox appears and Amy chooses to follow him, which allows Amy and Vicky to head in the opposite direction and emerge from the woods. They are unable to convince Galloway of the Doctor's innocence and he insists on organising a search of the woods for Laura. Galloway's partner DC Ruby Porter, whose uncle was the only person to disappear in the 1960s, releases the Doctor without authorisation and he realises the ship's pilot is still in the woods. The fox, Reyn, takes Amy to an artificial environment resembling a fairy tale castle where they meet Laura, now an elderly woman having lived there with Reyn for over sixty years. Reyn reveals his ship has been drawing people to it to try to recharge themselves and he has been trying to lure them to this realm to save them. If the ship departs now, when it has become interwoven with its surroundings, it will cause the destruction of the area.

Meanwhile, Rory and Emily find the ship communicating with them through the body of Harry Thompson, who disappeared just before Emily. When they confront it with the reality of its kidnapping people and draining their memories, the ship suffers an overload of guilt and wants to self-destruct. The Doctor joins the others in the woods and travels back to 1917, where he manages to talk the ship round, helping it achieve sentience and returning Rory and Harry to normal. However, with the ship now stable, Reyn wants to return to the war he was fighting when he crashed, even though doing he will have to rob the ship of its sentience and destroy the area to do so. The Doctor uses the triangulation devices to bring the TARDIS into the woods and convinces Reyn to let him take him home in that. Instead, he takes him to thousands of years in the future, where, despite his people losing the war, the empire that conquered them has fallen and they now live in peace. The Doctor has also planted a legend in the planet's history of a lost traveller and Reyn is welcomed as a hero.

Returning to the present, the Doctor reveals he can bring the ship into one time zone, so the disappearances never occurred, causing Ruby's uncle and the others to be restored to their original position with no-one knowing they were gone. Laura, Emily and Harry elect to stay with Ship as it safely departs to the stars.

== Critical reception ==
The novel was well received by critics, being described as 'well worth a read' by Starburst Magazine.
