= Sand Serpents =

- Written by: Raul Inglis
- Directed by: Jeff Renfroe
- Starring: Jason Gedrick; Tamara Hope; Elias Toufexis; Sebastian Knapp
- Music by: Pierpaolo Tiano
- Country of origin: Canada
- Original language: English

Production
- Executive producer: Michael Prupas
- Producer: Ric Nish
- Cinematography: Brendan Steacy
- Editor: Simon Webb
- Running time: 90 minutes
- Production companies: Media Pro Pictures; Muse Entertainment
- Budget: $1,800,000 (estimated)

Original release
- Network: Syfy
- Release: July 11, 2009

Sand Serpents is 2009 Canadian made-for-television sci-fi action horror film directed by Jeff Renfroe. It is the 20th film of the Maneater film series and originally premiered on Syfy on July 11, 2009.

== Plot ==
A group of special forces led by Lieutenant Richard Stanley (Jason Gedrick) arrives in Afghanistan in order to deal with the Taliban for their final mission before heading home to the states. However, the group is soon captured by the ambushing Taliban soldiers, who tie them up and plan to use them to request for money and the release of Taliban prisoners. Soon, there is an apparent earthquake with roars and screams that the group hears before managing to release themselves. The group is startled by the remains, including the Taliban filming camera, which does not reveal much. Private Andrews (Elias Toufexis) detects something moving, and Private Susan Eno (Michelle Asante) believes that it could be a mirage.

The group heads to a clear area for the chopper to pick them up, where they encounter a giant worm-like creature that emerges from the ground and drags the chopper down, causing it to crash. It chases the group back to the original building where they were captured, but the worm eats Sergeant Wilson (Chris Jarman) in the process. Stanley realizes that the worms can detect noises, which explains why it attacked the chopper. They then fix a car and try to escape, but Isla (Andreea Coscai), a young Afghani girl, runs to the front of their car, causing it to lose control and overturn, pinning Eno underneath and breaking her hip and legs. As the worms approach, she orders everyone else to leave and they do as the worms catch up and eat her.

In a ravaged refugee camp, the group acknowledges the actions of Taliban from information provided by a survivor, Amal (Imran Khan), Isla's father. He and his daughter decide to join the group of soldiers, but fail to convince the other women there, who wish to stay and wait until Taliban give them back their sons, including Isla's brother. On the way, Andrews shows a hostile attitude to Amal, saying that he could be a member of the terrorists. The group then makes the run again but once more they are trapped by Taliban and have to stay inside the original building, until the worms come and devour the Taliban. Unfortunately, Private Kaminsky (Sebastian Knapp) is mortally wounded due to a grenade explosion. Failing to carry him all the way back, the group has to abandon him; as he dies a worm eats him - in the process, Richard uses a grenade to blow up the creature.

The group reaches a tunnel, which according to Amal, can lead to the other side of Taliban's camp where they can call for choppers and supporting troops. However, Amal was attempting to find his son, so he leads the group around back to the Taliban's camp, until he steps on a land mine. As the way is blocked, the group returns to the door where they entered, which has no way to open it from the inside. Isla is then sent up to the ground through an alternative tunnel which only she can fit through. She opens the door on the other side as the worms, being attracted by the explosion in the tunnel, come and eat Andrews.

The group now only has three people, Stanley, Captain Jennifer Henle (Tamara Hope) and Isla. They know that the worms can hear them but can't see them, so they decide to use grenades as distractions to help them reach a tall building, where they ascertain that the worms couldn't reach them. As the plan seems to fail when they're very close to the building, they plan to commit suicide using a bomb pack. Then a Black Hawk arrives on time and kills one of the two worms, and the other submerges. The group is picked up but as they are about to flee, the last worm lunges out from the ground and tries to grab the chopper. To save the others, Stanley jumps into the worm's mouth and triggers the bomb pack, killing the worm and himself, leaving Henle as the sole survivor of all the soldiers.

== Cast ==
- Jason Gedrick as Lieutenant Richard Stanley
- Tamara Hope as Captain Jennifer Henle
- Elias Toufexis as Private Andrews
- Sebastian Knapp as Private Oscar Kaminsky
- Michelle Asante as Private Susan Eno
- Chris Jarman as Sergeant Wilson
- Constantin Viscreanu as Private Morales
- Duma Iulian as Corporal Bates
- Jonas Khan as Amal Jazeer
- Andreea Coscai as Isla
- Andreea Paduraru as Asala
- Bryan Jardine as Colonel Jones
- Roman Florentin as Taliban Leader
- Emil Hostina as Taliban Officer

== Home media ==
Sand Serpents was released on DVD on November 3, 2009.

== Streaming ==
As of 2019 the TV film was released on The Canada Media Fund's Encore+ YouTube channel.
