= Dean Bertram =

Australian writer, filmmaker, and film festival director

- Born: Australia
- Occupations: Writer, filmmaker, film festival director

Dean Bertram is a freelance writer, filmmaker, and film festival director based in Sydney, Australia. He is the co-founder of A Night of Horror International Film Festival.

== Academic background ==
In 2006, Bertram graduated with a PhD in American cultural history from the University of Sydney. His dissertation, Flying Saucer Culture: An Historical Survey of American UFO Belief, traces and examines the development of UFO belief within the context of American culture and society.

== Freelance writing ==
Bertram has written for a range of publications including The Australian, The Australian Financial Review, People Magazine, IPA Review, 3D World and Fortean Times. Several of his articles are archived online, including a piece on his time studying the Unarius UFO cult, an overview of conspiracy orientated cinema, and an exposé of the fascist ideology that lurks behind The Da Vinci Code. He was a regular contributor and columnist for The Spectator Australia from 2010 to 2014.

== Filmmaking ==
In an interview for the horror news website HorrorScope, Bertram traces his love of the horror genre to having watched John Carpenter's seminal horror film Halloween, at the age of ten. This is the time that Bertram shot his first Super 8 film.

His two most recent short films are Annie Get Your Whale Boy (2004) and Foresta Rossa (2006).

In February 2008, he completed principal photography on his first feature film Sick Day. Bertram who wrote the film, co-directed it with his brother Grant. As of June 2008, Sick Day is still in post-production.

== A Night of Horror International Film Festival ==
Bertram founded A Night of Horror International Film Festival, along with Lisa Mitchell and Grant Bertram in 2006. Bertram and Mitchell remain the festival's directors.
