= Beyond the Rave =

- Beyond the Rave
- Directed by: Matthias Hoene
- Written by: Tom Grass; Jon Wright
- Produced by: Ben Grass
- Starring: Nora Jane Noone; Jamie Dornan; Tamer Hassan; Joss Climo
- Cinematography: Ben Moulden
- Edited by: Lucas Roche
- Production company: Hammer Film Productions
- Distributed by: Pure Grass Films
- Release date: 17 April 2008
- Country: United Kingdom
- Language: English

Beyond the Rave is a British horror film, initially published on MySpace, that marked the return of Hammer Films in 2008.

== Plot ==
The story follows the last hours of freedom of local soldier Ed, who is flying out to Iraq the following morning. With the help of his best friend, Necro, he spends his last night in the UK tracking down his missing girlfriend, Jen, who was last seen partying with a bizarre group of hardcore nocturnal ravers led by the mysterious Melech. When he catches up with Jen at a party or rave in a remote forest, Ed discovers that Melech's crowd are vampires, using the rave to lure victims. Melech and his cult intend to harvest the victims' blood and use it to sustain themselves on a long sea voyage they are planning. Their plans go awry, however, when Ed and several other rave participants offer lethal resistance to the vampires.

== Cast ==
Actor	Character
Nora-Jane Noone	Jen
Jamie Dornan	Ed
Matthew Forrest	Necro
Tamer Hassan	Rich Crocker
Sebastian Knapp	Melech
Leslie Simpson	Belial
Steve Sweeney	Tooley
Ingrid Pitt	Tooley's mum
Sadie Frost	Fallen Angel
Jake Maskall	Stigoi
Mark Wingett	Ed's dad

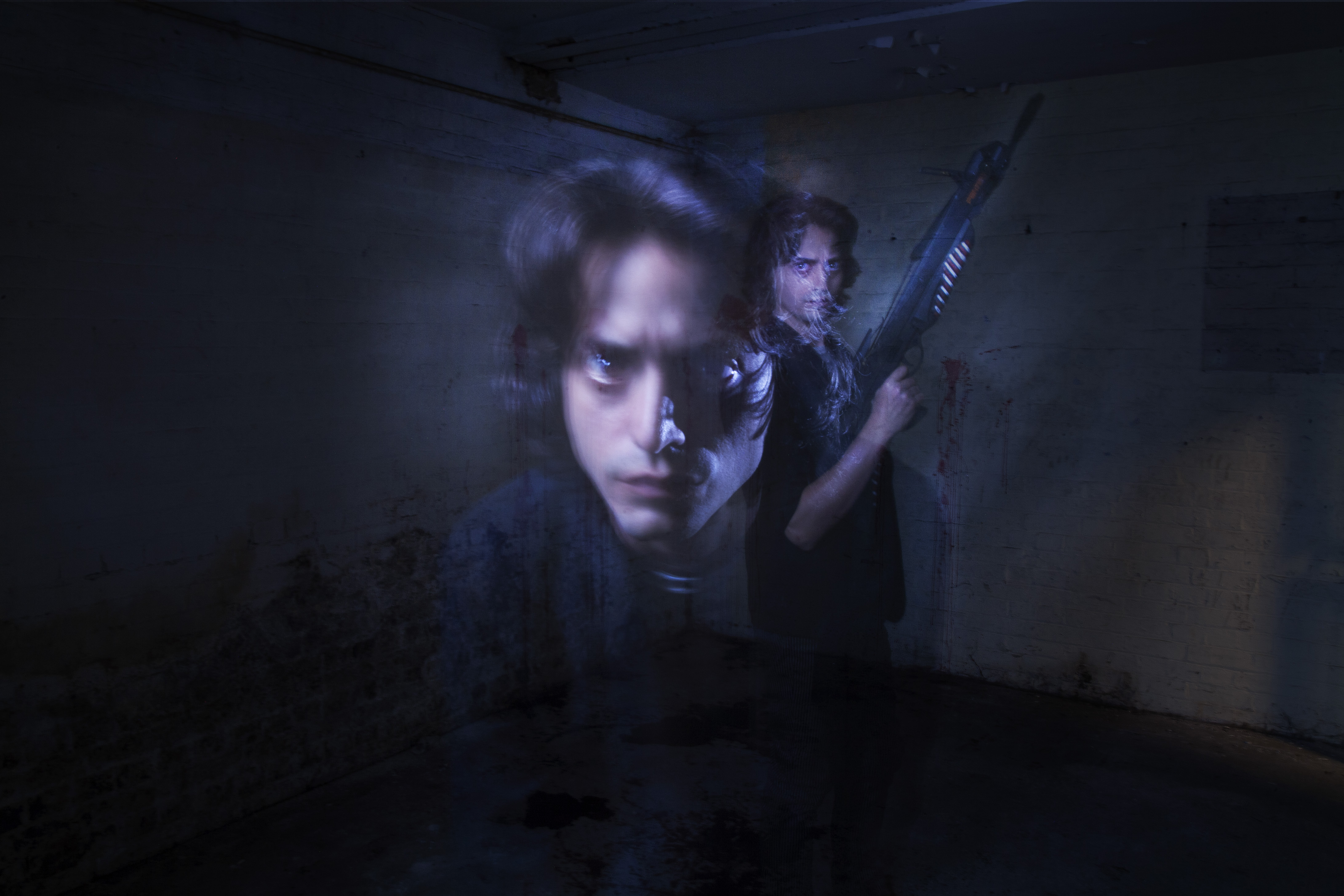
Sebastian Knapp as Melech

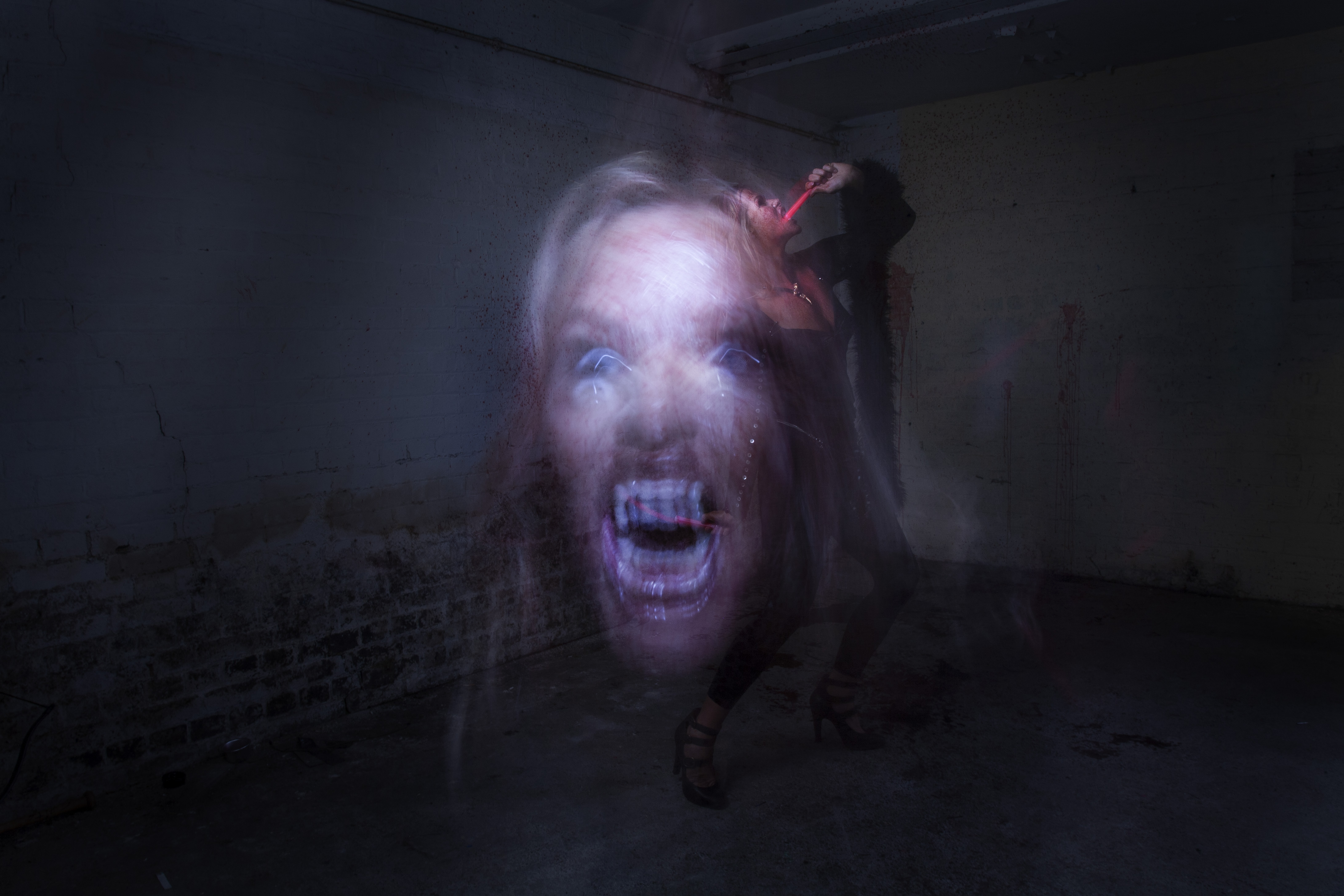
Emma Woollard as Anais

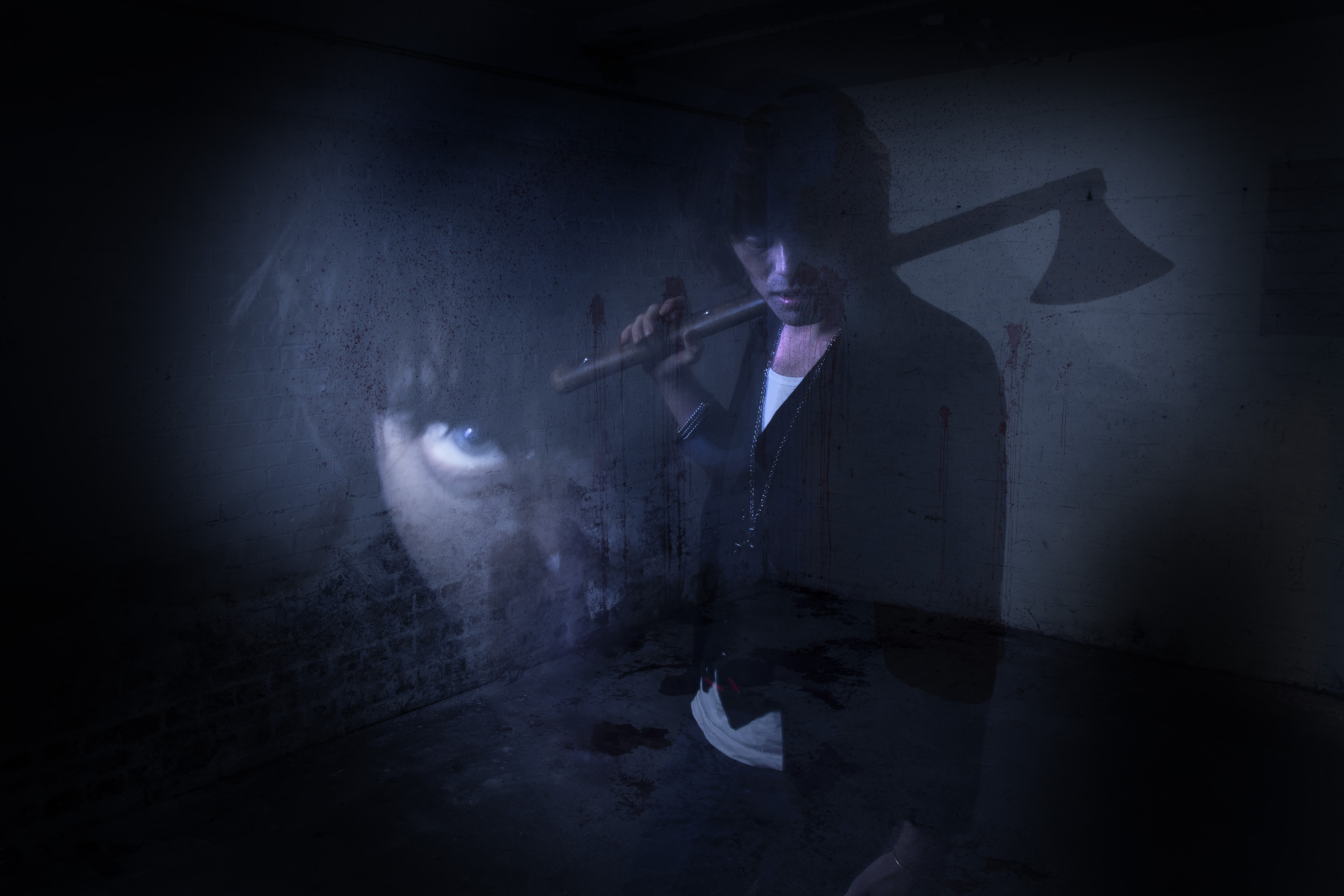
Jackson Scott as Botz

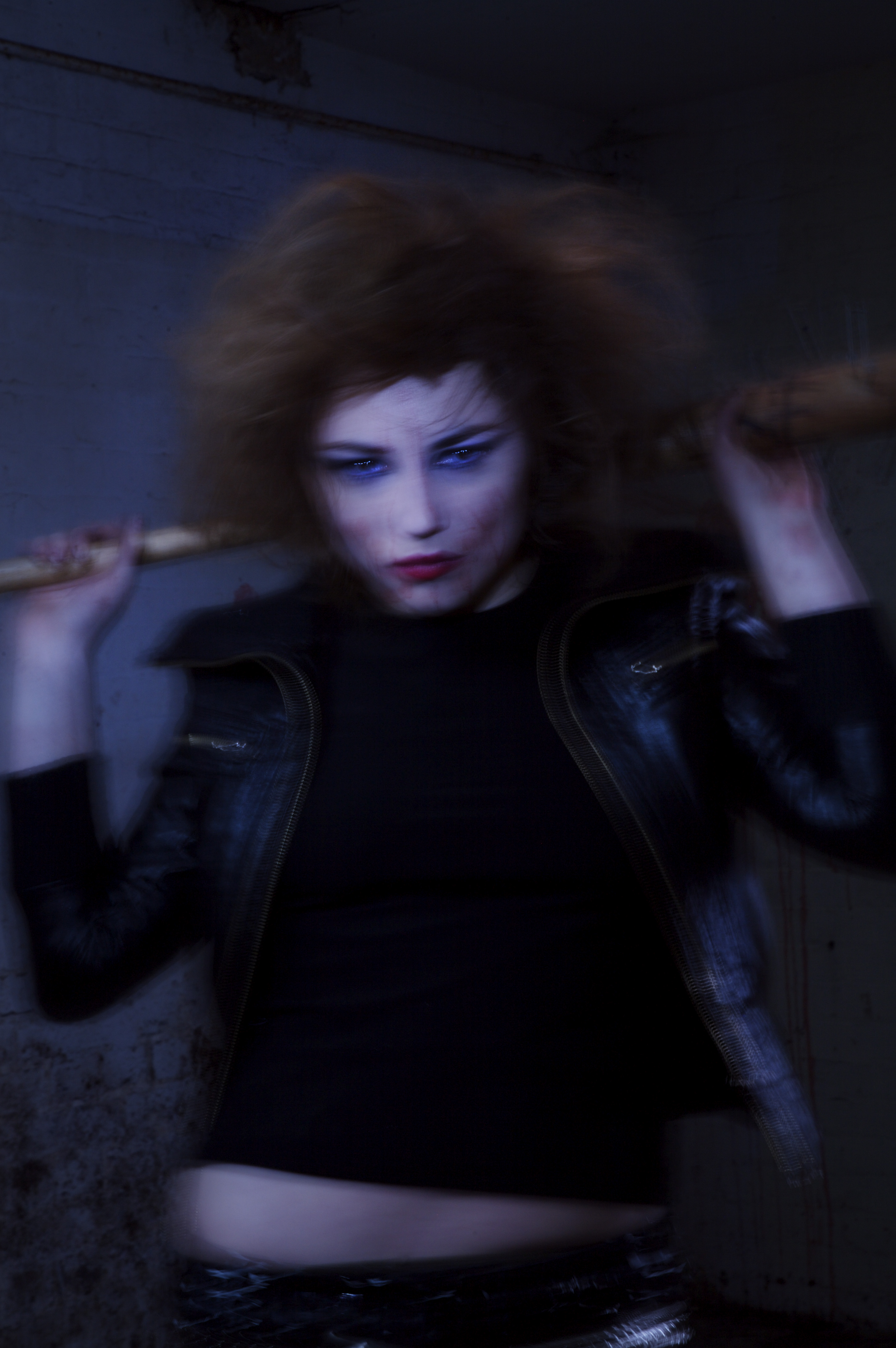
Lois Winstone as Lilith

== Production ==
Beyond the Rave is produced for Hammer by Pure Grass Films, in association with MySpaceTV, from an original story by Tom Grass. It is a vampire story set in England's underground party scene, and went online on MySpace on 17 April 2008.

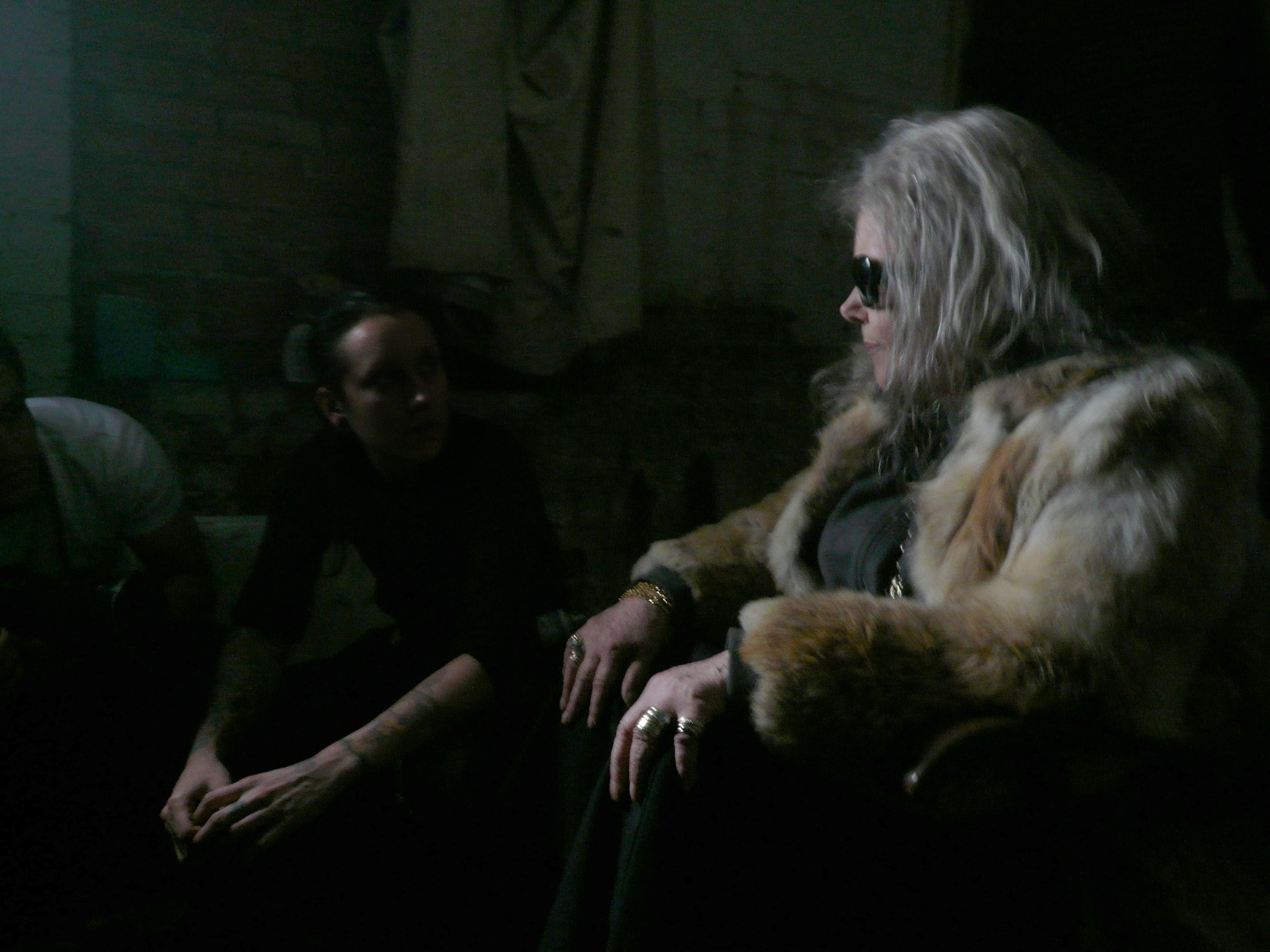
Ingrid Pitt in Beyond the Rave

The late Ingrid Pitt, who had starred in Hammer's past vampire films The Vampire Lovers and Countess Dracula, played a cameo role as the demented mother of a drug dealer living in a dark and rat-infested apartment. The segment would have appeared in episode 3, but was cut from the finished film, though Pitt is still listed as "Tooley's mum" in the credits. The scene is included as an extra on the DVD.

Sadie Frost, who appears as the vampire Fallen Angel, had previously played the doomed Lucy Westenra in Francis Ford Coppola's 1992 film version of Dracula.

== Release ==
The DVD was initially due to be released on 28 October 2009 over Pure Grass Films. However, this date was put back to September 2010. The DVD contains the final episode of the serial (not released online), as well as an additional episode called "Necro's First Kill," which details Necro's early reluctance to kill for blood as he and the surviving vampires struggle to flee England. The DVD was released as a limited edition of 5000 copies, each numbered. It was made available in both PAL and NTSC formats for direct order from Hammer Online.
