= Sebastian Knapp =

British actor

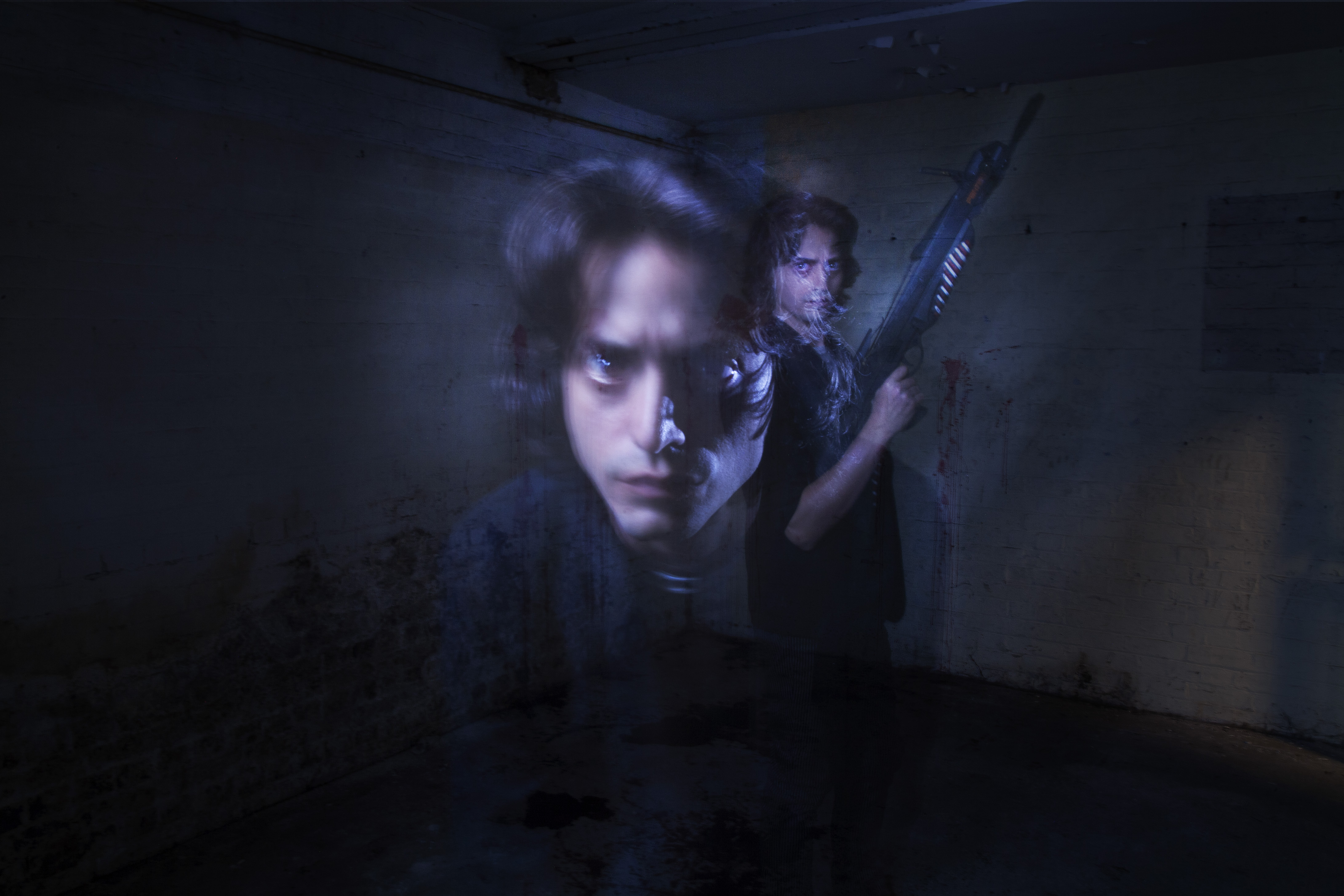
- Knapp as Melech in Beyond the Rave, 2007
- Born: 1980 (age 45–46); London, England, UK
- Occupation: Actor
- Years active: 1986–present

Sebastian Knapp is a British actor. He was born in 1980 in London. He has been an actor since age 6, and is best known for playing the role of Saint John in Son of God. He also played Melech in the 2008 cult Hammer film Beyond the Rave.

== Filmography ==
=== Films ===
Year	Title	Role	Notes
1986	School for Vandals	Ben	
1996	Samson and Delilah	Yoram	TV movie
1999	Jesus	Matthew	TV movie
2000	Running Time	Jed	
2000	Sorted	Jake	
2001	Fugee Girl		TV movie
2002	Below	Sonar #1	
2002	28 Days Later	Featured Infected	
2004	One Point O	Detective Harris	
2004	Gory Greek Gods	Dionysus	TV movie
2005	Dead Fish	Megakey Guy	
2005	Have No Fear: The Life of Pope John Paul II	Ali Agca	TV movie
2008	Beyond the Rave	Melech	
2009	Sand Serpents	Oscar Kaminsky	TV movie
2009	High Plains Invaders	Jules Arning	TV movie
2011	Forest of the Damned 2	Richard	
2014	Son of God	John	
2016	The Naughty List	Vince Napoli	Short
2018	I Am Vengeance	Keith	

=== Television ===
Year	Title	Role	Notes
1987	Aliens in the Family	Lewis	1 episode
1991	Screen One	Andrew / Boy in Film	2 episodes
1992	Maigret	Ernest Bonnet	1 episode
2002	Is Harry on the Boat?	Road Kill	1 episode
2002	Murder in Suburbia	Harry	1 episode
2006	The Wild West	Jimmy Dolan	1 episode
2006	Ultimate Force	Santa Rosa	1 episode
2006	Silent Witness	Billy Lloyd	1 episode
2008	The Bill	Carl Newton	1 episode
2010–2012	I Shouldn't Be Alive	Jim Davidson	26 episodes
2013	The Bible	John	4 episodes
