= Sanny van Heteren =

German actress (born 1977)

Sanny van Heteren (born 9 June 1977 in Winsen (Luhe), Germany) is a German actress who has worked in both Hollywood German and Spanish productions. Her first role was in Ein Fall für TKKG: Drachenauge, where she played the lead role of Gaby. She can also be seen in Unknown with Liam Neeson and Underworld: Awakening.

In 2009 she played the lead in High Plains Invaders, a SyFy original movie where she played a gunslinger by the name of Rose Hildrige.

Played the role of Christiane in Til Schweiger's movie Kokowääh in 2011. In 2012 she played the role of Rachel in Dave Parker's experimental project Coldwater. In 2017 she played her first role in a Spanish production "La niebla y la doncella" where she plays the anguished mother, Margarethe von Amsberg. The Film is based on a Spanish novel.

She has recently been on numerous German TV shows including Der Staatsanwalt, Der Dicke, Stuttgart Homicide, SOKO Wismar and Letzte Spur Berlin.

Sanny van Heteren was named ambassador of the city of Bad Kissingen on 19 December 2013.

== Filmography ==
- TKKG: Das Drachenauge (1992)
- Celebrity (1998)
- Black and White (1999)
- The Last Word (2008)
- High Plains Invaders (2009)
- The Key (short film) (2009)
- The Chosen One (2010)
- Kokowääh (2010)
- Unknown (2011)
- Hellraiser: Revelations (2011)
- Underworld: Awakening (2012)
- Tim Sander goes to Hollywood (2012)
- Violet (2013)
- Mindscape (2013)
- The Trials of Cate McCall (2014)
- The Key (2014)
- Framed (2015)
- La niebla y la doncella (2017)
