= Ion Cojar =

Romanian actor and director

Ion Cojar (January 9, 1931 – October 18, 2009) was a Romanian acting teacher, researcher, and theatre director. He is the founder of a unique method in the Romanian school of acting.

== Biography ==
Cojar was born in Recaș, a town in Timiș County.

As a professor and researcher at the Caragiale National University of Theatre and Film from Bucharest, Ion Cojar worked with his students to develop a specific psycho-emotional mechanism that would allow them to easily transform conventions in life truth, such as fictional and imaginary life situations. Ion Cojar often said that "the art of the actor has nothing in common with theatre". He supported an educational system of laboratory experimentation and self-knowledge.

As a theatre director, he aimed to persuade audiences into believing they were viewing an actual life event. Ion Cojar argued that in order to have an authentic performance, the actor's psycho-emotional processes—along with their speech, body movements and physiological changes—must not be anticipated so they wouldn't be anchored in preconceived thoughts. He also believed that the audience can identify when an actor is authentic through changes in the color and texture of their face, such as the flow of blood. Ion Cojar published his research in his book entitled O poetică a artei actorului" (Poetics of the actor's art).

Professional actors have trained in Cojar's pedagogical method. Professor Mircea Gheorghiu, another former student of Ion Cojar, is considered to be the main continuator of his teaching method. Adrian Țofei, a former student of Mircea Gheorgiu and follower of Cojar's method, won the Special Jury Prize for Best Actor at the 2016 Nashville Film Festival for his performance in Be My Cat: A Film for Anne.

Cojar died in Bucharest in 2009, age 78, and was buried with military honors in the city's Sfânta Vineri Cemetery.

== See also ==
- Method acting

== Bibliography ==
- Cojar, Ion - O poetică a artei actorului (Poetics of the actor's art) - Bucharest, Unitext, 1996 / Bucharest, Paideia, 1998
- Cojar, Ion - Inițiere în arta actorului (Initiation in the actor's art), series of articles published in Teatrul (Theatre) magazine, Bucharest, 1983-1984
- Tofei, Adrian - Ion Cojar's Acting Method
- "Doliu în lumea treatrului". Mediafax (in Romanian). October 18, 2019.
