= High Plains Invaders =

2009 TV film

- DVD cover
- Written by: Richard Beattie
- Directed by: K.T. Donaldson
- Starring: James Marsters; Cindy Sampson; Sebastian Knapp
- Theme music composer: James Gelfand
- Country of origin: United States
- Original language: English

Production
- Producer: Ric Nish
- Cinematography: Pierre Jodoin
- Editor: Simon Webb
- Running time: 87 minutes
- Production companies: Castel Film Romania; Muse Entertainment Enterprises

Original release
- Network: Syfy
- Release: August 30, 2009

High Plains Invaders is a 2009 American Western science fiction horror television film that aired on the Syfy Channel. It is the twenty-second film in the Maneater film series. The film stars James Marsters.

== Plot ==
A man goes to a small Colorado town to be hanged for his crimes in 1892 only to end up rescuing the town from alien invaders.

== Cast ==
- James Marsters as Sam Danville
- Cindy Sampson as Abigail Pixley
- Sebastian Knapp as Jules Arning
- Sanny van Heteren as Rose Hilridge
- Antony Byrne as Gus McGreevey
- Angus MacInnes as Silich Cure
- Adriana Butoi as Prospector's Wife
- James Carroll Jordan as Sheriff (as James Jordan)
- Constantin Barbulescu as Grizzled Miner
- Dan Bordeianu as Deputy
- Dugald Bruce-Lockhart as Cornelius Harrington (as Dugald Bruce Lockhart)
- Sorin Cristea as Prospector Franklin

== Production ==
High Plains Invaders was filmed in Romania in December 2008. Marsters said the film was a way to reinvent the Western film genre, which often had the same elements and types of characters, by including alien bugs.

== Home media ==
The film was released on DVD on April 6, 2010.

== Reception ==
High Plains Invaders has had mixed reviews. Dread Central wrote, "High Plains Invaders is an above average Syfy original, a pleasantly diverting Wild West creature feature worthy of a Saturday matinee viewing." The website said the acting was standard and that the creature design was reminiscent of the bugs from Starship Troopers. It also said the budget limitations were evident: "We see what looks like thousands of these bugs dropping from the mothership but only see them attack one at a time until the very final moments. The computer animated bugs look fairly credible, which may be due in some small part to how inorganically metallic they are meant to look in the first place." DVD Talk said that the film was "formulaic" like other films in the Maneater series. The website commended how it mixed genres such as Western and science fiction. It concluded, "Outside of its genre-hopping and setting, High Plains Invaders doesn't stray too much from this formula. However, at a breezy 87 minutes, Richard Beattie's script directed by K.T. Donaldson is never boring—and the requisite Saturday matinee ambience is always present." FEARnet said, "Screenwriter Richard Beattie seems to enjoy wading in the caricatured side of the genre pool, which means that each character is painted in rather broad brushstrokes. This helps to keep High Plains Invaders from ever becoming too dreary or boring—but it also means the five main characters are left spouting dialogue that, even if it's 'cute,' it's still pretty damn familiar." The website called the creature effects "more polished than you'd normally find" but noted how few were actually shown at any one time. It concluded, "Whereas most of the Maneater Series are 'guilty pleasures' at best, this one actually earns a few points in the realm of legitimate low-budget monster-making."

== On the same subject ==
- Cowboys & Aliens
