= Hunter's Moon (Finch novel) =

2011 novel by Paul Finch

- Author: Paul Finch
- Series: Doctor Who book: New Series Adventures
- Subject: Featuring: Eleventh Doctor; Amy Pond; Rory Williams
- Publisher: BBC Books
- Publication date: 28 April 2011
- Pages: 256
- ISBN: 978-1-84990-236-6
- Preceded by: The Way Through the Woods
- Followed by: Touched by an Angel

Hunter's Moon is a BBC Books original novel written by Paul Finch and based on the long-running British science fiction television series Doctor Who. It features the Eleventh Doctor, and his Companions Amy Pond and Rory Williams.

== Summary ==
A poorly chosen casino game lands Rory in a fight for his life as he 'works off' a debt for a criminal conspiracy. Amy is lost in space and the Doctor finds himself lost in red tape with the TARDIS well out of reach. Rory's best hope is for the Doctor to impersonate a violent mercenary. And also to run really fast.

== Characters ==
- Eleventh Doctor
- Amy Pond
- Rory Williams
- Xorg Krauzzen
- Mallick
- Grant Pangborne
- Harry Mossop
- Dora Mossop
- Sophie Mossop
- Kobal Zalu
- Zalizta
- Zarbotan
- Zargadoz Xaaael
- Sergeant Xelos

== Continuity ==
- The TARDIS is stolen by Xorg. It was previously stolen by The Master in Utopia and by Thomas Brewster in the Big Finnish Audio Drama The Boy That Time Forgot.
- The Terileptils are mentioned. They were at war with the Torodon in The Visitation.
- Aggedor, the Royal Beast of Peladon which appears in the story, is a species that fought on the Moon of Gorgoror in The Curse Of Peladon and The Monster Of Peladon.
- Kobal Zalu mentions that The Doctor had white hair the last time they met, suggesting an encounter with either the First or Third Doctor's.

== Audiobook ==
The story was released as an audiobook on 20 October 2011 on 6 CDs read by Arthur Darvill. It is also available as an unabridged audio download on Amazon.
