= Finale (film) =

- Directed by: John Michael Elfers
- Written by: John Michael Elfers
- Produced by: Michael Elkin and Marisa Wahl
- Starring: Carolyn von Hauck; Suthi Picotte; Domiziano Arcangeli
- Cinematography: Ryan Stevens Harris
- Edited by: Edward H. Stanley
- Music by: Shawn Clement and James Speight
- Production company: Fire Trial Films
- Distributed by: Image Entertainment
- Release date: March 29, 2009 (A Night of Horror)
- Running time: 93 minutes
- Country: United States
- Language: English

Finale is a 2009 horror film directed by John Michael Elfers and starring Carolyn von Hauck. Inspired by actual events from the director's life, FINALE is reminiscent of Suspiria, Hellraiser and Rosemary's Baby, shot in super 16mm to capture an authentic 1970s feel, with all practical in-camera effects, borrowed from the lost arts of early film magicians.

The film was released in the United States on May 25, 2010, after premiering at A Night of Horror in Sydney Australia, and Screamfest in the U.S. in 2009.

== Plot ==
A mother descends into madness after the apparent suicide of her eldest son. The bizarre circumstances surrounding his death cause the mother, Helen, to believe that much darker, sinister forces were behind the death of her son. But when Helen's investigation threatens to destroy her sanity in addition to her daughter's life, she realises that the only exit from the nightmare is the very route attempted by her dead son.

== Cast ==
- Carolyn von Hauck as Helen Michaels
- Suthi Picotte as Kathryn Michaels

== Reception ==
The film received positive reviews from LA Weekly, Arrow in the Head, and Digital Retribution.

=== Awards ===
- "Independent Spirit Award" the A Night of Horror film festival of Sydney, Australia
