= Brian Finch =

British television scriptwriter and dramatist

- Born: James Brian Finch; 25 July 1936; Standish, Lancashire, England
- Died: 27 June 2007 (aged 70); Wigan, England
- Education: Thornleigh Salesian College
- Occupation: Television writer
- Spouse: Margaret Moran
- Children: Paul Finch and three daughters

Brian Finch (25 July 1936 – 27 June 2007) was a British television scriptwriter and dramatist. His longest relationship was with the ITV1 soap opera, Coronation Street, for which he wrote 150 scripts between 1970 and 1989. He also helped the development of All Creatures Great and Small, The Tomorrow People, and Heartbeat. He contributed several episodes to the British detective programmes The Gentle Touch, Hetty Wainthropp Investigates, Bergerac and The Bill. It was for his work as a writer on Goodnight Mr Tom, a bittersweet drama starring John Thaw, for which he received a BAFTA.

== Early life and education ==
Brian Finch was born in Standish, Lancashire, a descendant of Charles Dickens his father was a miner. He was educated at St. Joseph's School and then Thornleigh Salesian College. At 15 years old he was a cub reporter for the local evening newspaper Westhoughton Journal.

== Career ==
His National Service was with the RAF at NATO's Fontainebleau headquarters in France, after which he worked on the Manchester Evening News. In 1961 he was working at the TV Times ghost-writing articles for the Beatles. He joined the BBC as a press officer for Top of the Pops and submitted his first drama script in January 1966 for the Wednesday Play outlet titled Rodney Our Intrepid Hero, a comedy about a newspaper reporter investigating a vice ring, starring Jim Norton in his first television role. In 1968 his first episode of Z-Cars was recorded.

Between 1970 and 1989, Finch wrote more than 150 episodes of the ITV1 soap opera, Coronation Street, including the first to feature Deirdre Barlow, he also wrote the first episodes for barmaid Bet Lynch, Mike Baldwin and Jack and Vera Duckworth.

In 1972 Finch wrote An Arrow for Little Audrey a Thirty-Minute Theatre production starring Geoffrey Hughes. He wrote 13 episodes of the TV series The Tomorrow People in 1973. He wrote for the Hunter's Walk series from 1973 to 1974 a police series set in Rushden Northamptonshire starring Ruth Madoc and Ewan Hooper. In 1974 Finch wrote a six-part children's adventure series, The Chinese Puzzle broadcast on BBC1 and in 1978 wrote 9 episodes of Fallen Hero for Granada Television. He also wrote a number of episodes forJuliet Bravo, The Gentle Touch, Hetty Wainthropp Investigates, Bergerac and The Bill. From 1987 to 1989 he wrote for the comedy drama Flying Lady which starred Frank Windsor and from 1992 to 2006 he wrote 35 episodes for Heartbeat set in rural Yorkshire.

2005 saw the release of his film adaptation of Heidi directed by Paul Marcus, starring Emma Bolger with Max Von Sydow and Diana Rigg. In 2006 Finch worked on the TV screenplay of The Shell Seekers which starred Academy Award-winners, Vanessa Redgrave and Maximilian Schell.

Finch wrote the original version of Leviathan for Doctor Who, which was initially for season 22. His script was later adapted by his son Paul Finch for audio release by Big Finish.

== Personal life ==
Finch married Margaret Moran in 1963 and was the father of the horror author and scriptwriter Paul Finch.
