= Son of God (film) =

- Theatrical release poster
- Directed by: Christopher Spencer
- Screenplay by: Richard Bedser; Christopher Spencer; Colin Swash; Nic Young
- Based on: New Testament
- Produced by: Roma Downey; Mark Burnett
- Starring: Diogo Morgado; Greg Hicks; Adrian Schiller; Darwin Shaw; Sebastian Knapp; Joe Wredden; Simon Kunz; Paul Marc Davis; Matthew Gravelle; Amber Rose Revah; Roma Downey
- Cinematography: Rob Goldie
- Edited by: Robert Hall
- Music by: Lorne Balfe; Lisa Gerrard; Hans Zimmer
- Production company: Lightworkers Media
- Distributed by: 20th Century Fox (North America); Relativity International (International)
- Release date: February 28, 2014 (United States)
- Running time: 138 minutes
- Country: United States
- Language: English
- Budget: $22 million
- Box office: $70.9 million

Son of God is a 2014 American epic biblical film directed by Christopher Spencer, and produced by Mark Burnett and Roma Downey. The film retells the life of Jesus Christ and is an adaptation of the miniseries The Bible, which aired in March 2013 on the History channel, and immediately following the movie begins another TV series called A.D. The Bible Continues. The film stars Diogo Morgado, Greg Hicks, Adrian Schiller, Darwin Shaw, Sebastian Knapp, Joe Wredden, Simon Kunz, Paul Marc Davis, Matthew Gravelle, Amber Rose Revah, and Roma Downey.

The film was released in the United States and Canada on February 28, 2014. The film received negative reviews from critics and grossed $70 million against a budget of $22 million.

== Plot ==
John, the last surviving follower of Jesus Christ, lives in exile as a hermit near the seaside where he tells his story of his time with Jesus. In Bethlehem, Jesus is born to a virgin named Mary and her husband Joseph. Three wise men visit Jesus and declare him the future King.

Thirty years later, an adult Jesus travels to Galilee and begins recruiting followers, James, his brother John, Peter, a fisherman, Matthew, a tax collector and Mary Magdalene. Soon, they become his disciples.

Through his teachings and numerous miracles, Jesus builds a huge following, who begin to call him the Messiah. He also draws the attention of the Pharisees, Jewish religious leaders. The Pharisees claim Jesus is blaspheming God by forgiving sins, something only God can do. Jesus responds by saying he is the Son of God.

Jesus tells the disciples they are to travel to Jerusalem for the upcoming Passover holiday. He enters the city on the back of a donkey and is met by a huge crowd of supporters, who lay palm leaves in his path. Caiaphas, the head of the Pharisees, is afraid that Jesus' presence in the city will further agitate his people, who are already in a near state of revolt against the oppressive Romans, led by Pontius Pilate. It is revealed that, earlier, Pilate had warned Caiaphas that if there were any trouble from the Jews, he would close the temple, thus cancelling Passover.

Upon entering the temple, Jesus sees a group of money changers and proceeds to upend their tables. This act draws cheers from the people and scorn from the Pharisees. Later, Jesus tells a little girl that every stone of the temple will soon fall. The Pharisees take this as a plan to destroy the temple and decide Jesus must be stopped. Judas, one of Jesus' disciples, approaches the Pharisees. He believes Jesus is going too far and wants to help. The Pharisees give him 30 pieces of silver for his assistance.

The night before Passover, Jesus tells the disciples this will be their Last Supper together and says that one of them will betray him. Later, in the Garden of Gethsemane, Judas kisses Jesus' cheek, thereby identifying Jesus to the Pharisees and revealing Judas' betrayal. Jesus is arrested while the disciples flee the garden to save themselves.

Out of fear of the temple's closure due to an open trial during Passover, Caiaphas orders an immediate trial during the late hours of night in privacy, which are violations of Jewish law, against the order of other priests. Caiaphas asks Jesus if he is the son of God, and he answers "I am". This is all the Pharisees need to hear, and they immediately find Jesus guilty of blasphemy.

That morning, to a growing crowd, Caiaphas announces Jesus' guilt and reveals the penalty for blasphemy is death. Judas, horrified by what he has done, throws the silver at the Pharisees and runs off; he later hangs himself. Peter thrice denies knowing Jesus. Caiaphas believes if the Pharisees killed Jesus on Passover, it would start a riot, so he turns him over to the Romans for the punishment.

Jesus is brought to trial before Pilate, who tells Caiaphas that Jesus didn't break any Roman laws, but orders him to be lashed 40 times. Since it's Passover, Pilate says he will follow tradition and free a prisoner of the people's choosing, and if they choose Jesus, he will be set free. By this time, Mary has arrived in Jerusalem to see what is happening to her son.

Pilate orders the crowd to enter his courtyard to choose whether to release Jesus or Barabbas, a convicted murderer. Since none of Jesus' followers are allowed into the courtyard, Caiaphas easily sways the vote so that Barabbas is set free. Pilate then asks what he should do with Jesus, and again Caiaphas sways the crowd to have him executed by way of crucifixion.

Fearing a riot among the hostile people, Pilate orders the crucifixion, then literally washes his hands of the situation. A battered and bloodied Jesus then carries a cross to Golgotha and is nailed to it by the mocking Roman guards, who earlier had placed a crown of thorns on his head. Before the cross is put into place, Pilate orders a sign attached to it, reading: "The King of the Jews", much to Caiaphas' dismay.

With John, Mary and Magdalene watching in horror, Jesus is crucified on the cross for several agonizing hours. After forgiving the Romans and the Pharisees who condemned him to death, he asks why God has forsaken him, and declares "It is finished". Accomplished, Jesus dies as the temple and earth are shaken by an earthquake. While the lamps are knocked down, the curtains in the temple where God's spirit was supposed to be present, tear apart. He is then lowered from the cross and placed into a tomb, which is sealed off with a large rock.

Three days later, Magdalene goes to visit the tomb but is shocked to see the rock broken into pieces and the tomb empty. Magdalene soon sees a man by the tomb's entrance and realizes he is Jesus, who has been resurrected. Magdalene goes to the disciples' hiding place and tells them the good news, but they don't believe her at first. Jesus then appears to them, and they all now believe, except "Doubting" Thomas. Once Thomas touches Jesus, then he believes.

Forty days later, Jesus is speaking to his disciples where he tells them to travel the world and spread his message. He then ascends into Heaven, and the disciples go their separate ways.

After finishing his story, an elderly John says that all of the disciples were eventually killed for their beliefs, except him. He has been exiled to live alone on a deserted island until he dies. Jesus then pays him a visit and tells him that he will return.

== Cast ==
- Diogo Morgado as Jesus Christ: A carpenter from Nazareth who is the son of God.
- Greg Hicks as Pontius Pilate: The governor of Judaea who orders the crucifixion of Jesus.
- Adrian Schiller as Caiaphas: The current high priest.
- Darwin Shaw as Simon Peter: A former fisherman and one of the twelve disciples of Jesus.
- Sebastian Knapp as John: A former fisherman and one of the twelve disciples of Jesus.
- Joe Wredden as Judas Iscariot: One of the twelve disciples of Jesus, who betrays Jesus.
- Simon Kunz as Nicodemus: A leading Pharisee from Jerusalem, who meets with Jesus at night.
- Paul Marc Davis as Simon the Pharisee: A Pharisee from Galilee.
- Matthew Gravelle as Thomas: One of the twelve disciples of Jesus, who doubts Jesus.
- Amber Rose Revah as Mary Magdalene: One of the women who follow Jesus.
- Roma Downey as Mary: The mother of Jesus.

== Production ==
The film features select scenes from the miniseries as well as footage not aired in the telecast. However, the film does not include scenes featuring Satan (played by Mohamen Mehdi Ouazanni) due to claims that the actor resembled the United States President Barack Obama. The resemblance was first pointed out by Glenn Beck ahead of that episode's premiere. The film's casting director Carl Proctor, claimed that the resemblance is entirely accidental. The trailer for the film also shows some scenes from the miniseries featuring David (played by Langley Kirkwood), Adam (played by Paul Knops), destruction of the city of Sodom and Moses (played by Will Houston) parting the Red Sea.

== Reception ==
=== Box office ===
Son of God grossed $59.7 million in North America and $11.2 million in other territories for a worldwide total of $70.9 million, against a production budget of $22 million.

The film was projected to gross around $27 million in its opening weekend. It made $1.2 million from Thursday night previews, benefiting greatly from advance ticket sales; it ended up making $26.5 million in its first weekend.

=== Critical response ===
Rotten Tomatoes reported that 17% of critics have given the film a positive review based on 71 reviews with an average rating of 4.69/10. The site's critics consensus reads, "The faithful may find their spirits raised, but on purely cinematic terms, Son of God is too dull and heavy-handed to spark much fervor." Another review aggregator, Metacritic, assigned a weighted average score of 37 out of 100 based on 25 critics, indicating "generally unfavorable reviews". Audiences polled by CinemaScore gave the film an average grade of "A−" on an A+ to F scale.

Nell Minow of Beliefnet gave the film a B grade, saying "It tells the story in a westernized, conventional manner that can seem superficial at times, more a cinematic Sunday School lesson than a movie. It is unlikely to persuade anyone, but it is undeniably moving and many believers will find it inspiring." Jim Slotek of the Toronto Sun gave the film 3 stars.

Ben Kenigsberg of The A.V. Club gave the film a mixed review, grading it a C and saying, "Unlike Gibson's film, with its relentless and gory focus on Christ's last days, Son Of God finds time for lessons along with its bloodletting. [...] Accompanied by a score that sounds recycled from The Fountain, the most famous scenes are trotted out: "I'll give my stone to the first man who tells me that he has never sinned"; the loaves and fishes; the resurrection of Lazarus; the last supper. It's unlikely Paul Verhoeven will ever get to make his historical Christ movie, but to the extent that Son Of God has a measure of dramatic impact, it's how it illustrates the radicalism of Jesus' message and the threat it posed to the establishment. At any rate, the core ideas are more compelling than the bad effects shots of Jerusalem, the cheesy CG water-walking, or whatever exchanges require the actors to emit something other than a declarative shout."

== Awards and nominations ==
The film was awarded the Grace Award by MovieGuide at the 2014 MovieGuide Awards.

== See also ==
- List of Easter films
