= Una McCormack =

British-Irish academic and writer (born 1972)

Dr. Una McCormack, Ph.D
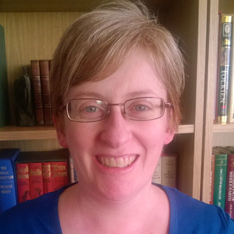
- McCormack in 2017
- Born: 13 January 1972 (age 54); St Helens, Merseyside, England
- Occupations: Academic; Author
- Known for: Star Trek; Doctor Who

Una McCormack (born 13 January 1972) is a British-Irish academic, scriptwriter and novelist.

McCormack previously taught creative writing at Anglia Ruskin University, where she was also a co-director of their Centre for Science Fiction and Fantasy. She is best known as the author of numerous tie-in novels and audio dramas based on the science fiction TV franchises Star Trek, and Doctor Who.

== Early life ==
McCormack was born on 13 January 1972 in St Helens, Merseyside. She is the youngest of six children born to Gerald James McCormack and Kathleen McCormack (née Towey), both primary school teachers. She was educated at Carmel College, St Helens, then studied for a BA in History and Social and Political Science at Newnham College, Cambridge, followed by an MSc in Psychology at the University of Reading and a PhD in Sociology at the University of Surrey.

== Published Fiction ==
McCormack's first professionally published fiction was a short story, "A Time and a Place", published in issue 197 of Doctor Who Magazine in 1993.

Her fan fiction based on the television series Star Trek: Deep Space Nine led to her being commissioned to write a short story, "Face Value", for the Prophet and Change anthology collection published by Pocket Books in 2003. Other pitches led to the novella The Lotus Flower as well as the first of several novels, Hollow Men. To date she has written a total of ten Star Trek novels based on four TV series (Deep Space Nine, Discovery, Picard, and Strange New Worlds), as well as those original to the franchise's literary continuity. Her latest, The Peacemakers, is due to be released in late 2026. She is also the author of the in-universe autobiographies of Mr. Spock, and Kathryn Janeway.

She has written four Doctor Who novels for the official New Series Adventures range published by BBC Books: The King's Dragon (2010), The Way Through the Woods (2011), Royal Blood (2015) and Molten Heart (2018), and another Doctor Who novel, All Flesh is Grass (2020), for the Time Lord Victorious multi-platform story event. She adapted the Ncuti Gatwa story The Robot Revolution as a Young Adult novel, which won a BSFA Award in the Younger Readers category in 2026.

McCormack has also written prose fiction based upon the TV series Blake's 7, and Firefly, as well as audio dramas based on Doctor Who and it's spin-off Torchwood, Blake's 7, and Star Cops.

In 2026, she contributed a short story ("Paradise Shores") to The Thirteenth Floor Anthology (Rebellion, 2026, ISBN 9781837866038)

== Academia ==
As an academic McCormack has also continued to write and present about literary science fiction, contributing to and co-editing several edited collections.

== Personal life ==
McCormack lives in Cambridge with her partner Matthew and their daughter.

== Honours and Awards ==
Her 2024 Star Trek: Strange New Worlds novel Asylum won the Scribe Award for Best Original Speculative novel.

The Robot Revolution, her Young Adult novelisation of the Doctor Who episode of the same name, won the BSFA Award for "Best Fiction For Younger Readers" in 2026.

== Bibliography (Prose Fiction) ==
=== Star Trek ===
- Star Trek: Deep Space Nine - Prophecy and Change (September 2003), anthology containing the short story "Face Value".
- Star Trek: Deep Space Nine - Worlds of Star Trek: Deep Space Nine, Volume One (May 2004), anthology containing the novella "The Lotus Flower".
- Star Trek: Deep Space Nine - Hollow Men (April 2005).
- Star Trek: Deep Space Nine - The Never-Ending Sacrifice (August 2009).
- Star Trek: Typhon Pact - Brinkmanship (September 2012).
- Star Trek: The Fall - The Crimson Shadow (September 2013).
- Star Trek: Deep Space Nine - The Missing (December 2014).
- Star Trek: Deep Space Nine - Engima Tales (June 2017).
- Star Trek: Discovery - The Way To The Stars (January 2019).
- Star Trek: Picard - The Last Best Hope (February 2020).
- The Autobiography of Kathryn Janeway (October 2020).
- Star Trek: Discovery - Wonderlands (May 2021).
- The Autobiography of Mr. Spock (September 2021).
- Star Trek: Picard - Second Self (September 2022).
- Star Trek: Strange New Worlds - Asylum (November 2024).

=== Blake's 7 ===
- Heroes (December 2017), anthology containing the short story "Separate".
- Origins (March 2023), anthology containing the novelisations of series one episodes "Bounty" and "Deliverance".

=== Firefly ===
- Carnival (November 2021).
- Coup de Grâce (July 2023).

== Bibliography (Audio Fiction) ==
=== Blake's 7 ===
- Crossfire, Part 3 (April 2018), serial containing the episode "Ministry of Truth".

=== Star Cops ===
- Mars, Part 1 (December 2019), serial containing the episode "The Shadow of This Red Rock".
- Blood Moon: Troubled Waters (March 2024).

=== Torchwood ===
- Infidel Places (April 2022).
- Among Us, Part 1 (May 2023), serial containing the episode "Colin Alone".

=== Gallifrey ===
- Evolution (February 2013).
- Partisans (March 2019), part 2 of the Time War 2 Set.

=== Bernice Summerfield ===
- Good Night, Sweet Ladies (June 2014).
- The Tears of Isis (June 2015).
- The Very Dark Thing (August 2016).
- The Angel of History (September 2018).

=== Big Finish: Main Range ===
- An Eye For Murder (July 2014), Part 3 of the Breaking Bubbles and other stories set.
- Red Planets (August 2018).

=== The Doctor Chronicles ===
- Field Trip (February 2020).
- The Siege of Shackleton (November 2023).

=== The War Master ===
- The Players (February 2022).

=== Call Me Master ===
- The Good Life (February 2025).

== Bibliography (Non-Fiction) ==
=== As sole author ===
- Black Archive #23: The Curse of Fenric (September 2018).

=== As editor ===
- Impossible Worlds, Impossible Things: Cultural Perspectives on Doctor Who, Torchwood and The Sarah Jane Adventures, with Melissa Beattie, and Ross P. Garner; also contributed the chapter "Fifty Not Out – The Doctor's Enduring Appeal" (May 2010).
- Biology and Manners: Essays on the Worlds and Works of Lois McMaster Bujold, with Regina Yung Lee (June 2020)
- Short But Concentrated: an essay symposium on the works of Lois McMaster Bujold, with Regina Yung Lee; also contributed the chapter “The Cure at Vilnoc: scientific method, revelation, and folk wisdom in ‘The Physicians of Vilnoc’" (September 2020)
- Short But Concentrated #2: a second essay symposium on the works of Lois McMaster Bujold (September 2024)
- Woman’s Hour: Daily Meditations from Wise, Witty, and Wonderful Women (February 2025).

=== As contributor ===
- "He's Not the Messiah: undermining political and religious authority in New Doctor Who", in The Unsilent Library: Essays on the Russell T. Davies Era of the new Doctor Who, edited by Simon Bradshaw, Tony Keen, and Graham Sleight (January 2011).
- Behind the Sofa: Celebrity Memories of Doctor Who, edited by Steve Berry (September 2012).
- "No Competition", in Chicks Unravel Time: Women Journey Through Every Season of Doctor Who, edited by L.M. Myles, and Deborah Stanish (November 2012).
- "Amy's Choice: Doctor Who Companions and the Nightmare of Domesticity" in Companion Piece: Women Celebrate the Humans, Aliens and Tin Dogs of Doctor Who, edited by Liz Barr, and L.M. Myles (April 2015).
- “Finding Ourselves in the (Un)Mapped Lands: Women’s Reparative Readings of The Lord of the Rings” in Perilous and Fair: women in the Works and Life of J.R.R. Tolkien, edited by Janet Brennan Croft, and Leslie Donovan (June 2015)
- Star Trek IV: The Voyage Home, in The Routledge Handbook of Star Trek, edited by Leimar Garcia-Siino, Sabrina Mittermeier, and Stefan Rabitsch (July 2022).
- "Wind-Riders, Divers, and Merry Whales: Vonda N. McIntyre’s Star Trek Novels", in Strange Novel Worlds: Essays on Star Trek Tie-In Fiction, edited by Caroline-Isabelle Caron, and Kristin Noone (July 2024).
