= Paul Finch =

English author and scriptwriter

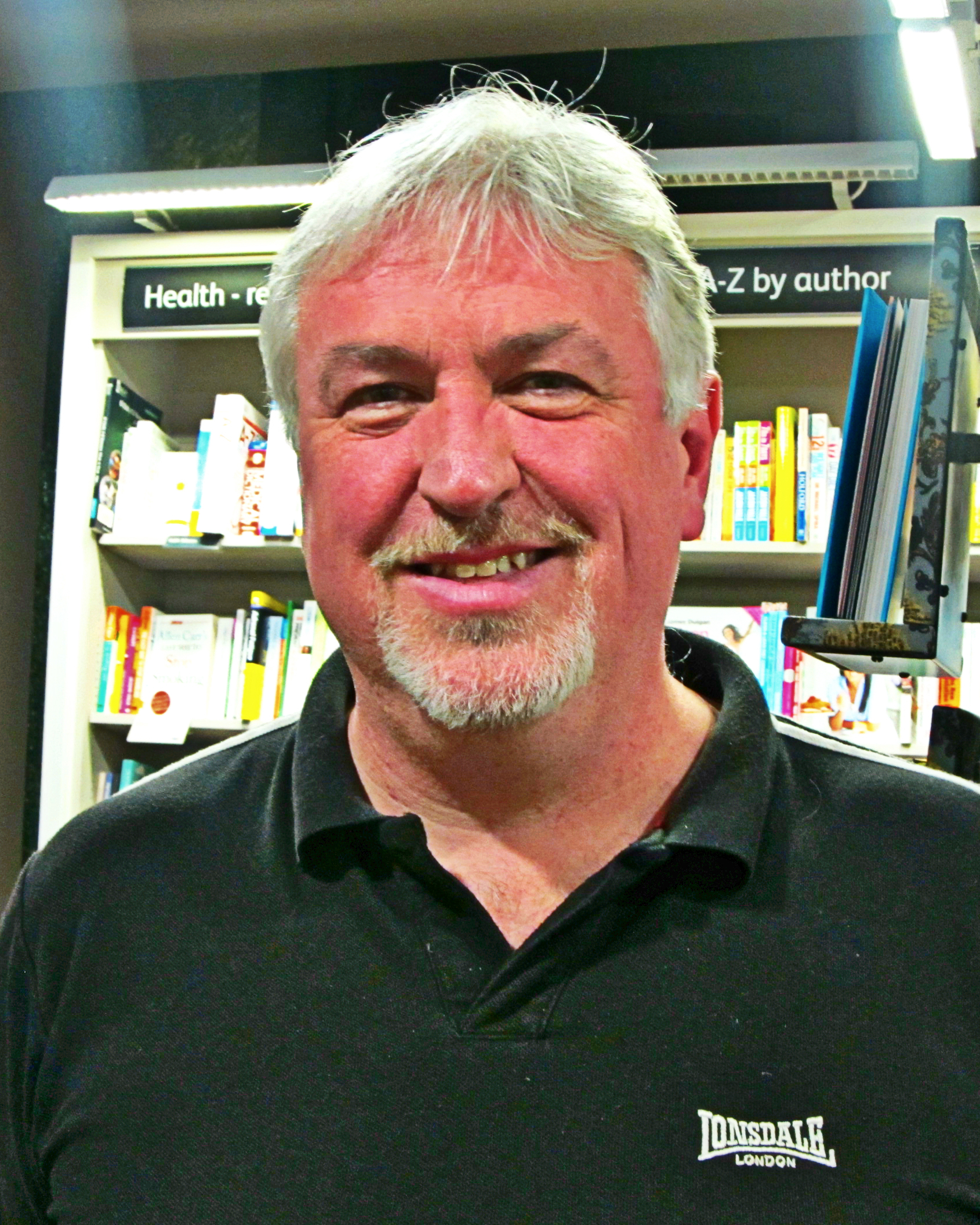
- Paul Finch at Liverpool One's Waterstones, 13 March 2015
- Born: Lancashire, England
- Education: Goldsmiths, University of London
- Occupations: Author, screenwriter, former policeman and journalist
- Spouse: Catherine Finch
- Children: Eleanor and Harry
- Writing career
- Genres: Crime, thriller, horror, science fiction
- Notable works: The "Heck" novels, Doctor Who
- Website: Walking in the Dark

Paul Finch is an English author and scriptwriter. He began his writing career on the British television programme The Bill. His early scripts were for children's animation. He has written over 300 short stories which have appeared in magazines, such as All Hallows, the magazine of the Ghost Story Society and Black Static. He also edits anthologies of Horror stories with the overall title of Terror Tales. He has written variously for the books and other spin-offs from Doctor Who. He is the author of the ongoing series of DS Mark Heck Heckenberg novels.

== Early life and education ==
Finch is the son of British television scriptwriter and dramatist Brian Finch. He studied history at Goldsmiths, University of London. He was a police officer with the Greater Manchester Police until 1988 and later a journalist. After being made redundant a few times, he turned to freelance writing in 1998.

== Children's animation ==
In 1998 Finch wrote one episode of Little Hippo: Hippos Ahoy for Siriol Productions. In 2002 he worked on fifty 6½ minute episodes of an animated TV series for children called Nora and the Magic Tree for Hogg's Back Films.

== Film ==
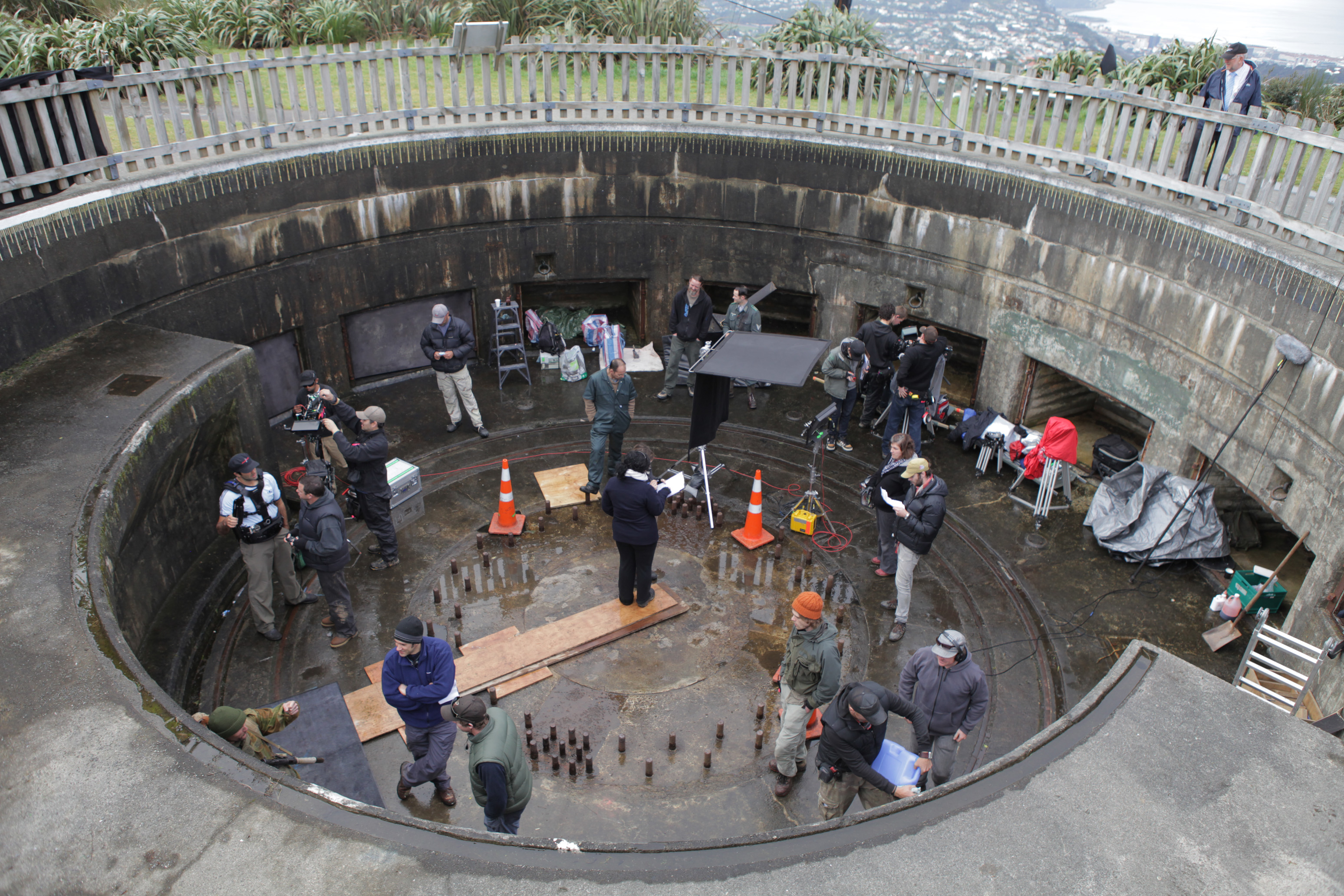
Filming The Devil's Rock at Wrights Hill Fortress, Karori, Wellington, New Zealand

Finch wrote additional material for the 2005 film Spirit Trap and co-wrote the 2011 film The Devil's Rock with Paul Campion and Brett Ihaka.

Finch wrote the screenplay for War Wolf, which is in pre-production at Amber Entertainment, with Paul Campion attached to direct.

== Doctor Who ==
- "Spoil Sport" - story in Short Trips: Destination Prague, published in 2007 in the series Big Finish Short Trips, featuring the Third Doctor and Jo Grant. The story is set in Prague. ISBN 1-84435-253-6
- Leviathan (audio drama) - this story was originally written by his father, Brian Finch. The script was initially for season 22 of Doctor Who. Paul Finch adapted it for a Big Finish Productions audio in 2010 for Doctor Who: The Lost Stories. It features the Sixth Doctor and Peri Brown and concerns Herne the Hunter.
- Hexagora - another Doctor Who: The Lost Stories audio drama from Big Finish Productions in 2011. This features the Fifth Doctor, Tegan Jovanka and Nyssa.
- The Sentinels of the New Dawn - a Companions Chronicles audio drama from Big Finish Productions in 2011. This features the Third Doctor and Liz Shaw. This story is a prequel to Leviathan, which was written by his father Brian Finch.
- Hunter's Moon - this novel featured the Eleventh Doctor, Amy Pond and Rory Williams. (BBC Books 2011, ISBN 978-1-84990-236-6 )
- "Strangers in the Outland" - a story in Doctor Who: Tales of Trenzalore: The Eleventh Doctor's Last Stand (BBC Books 2014, ISBN 978-1849908443)

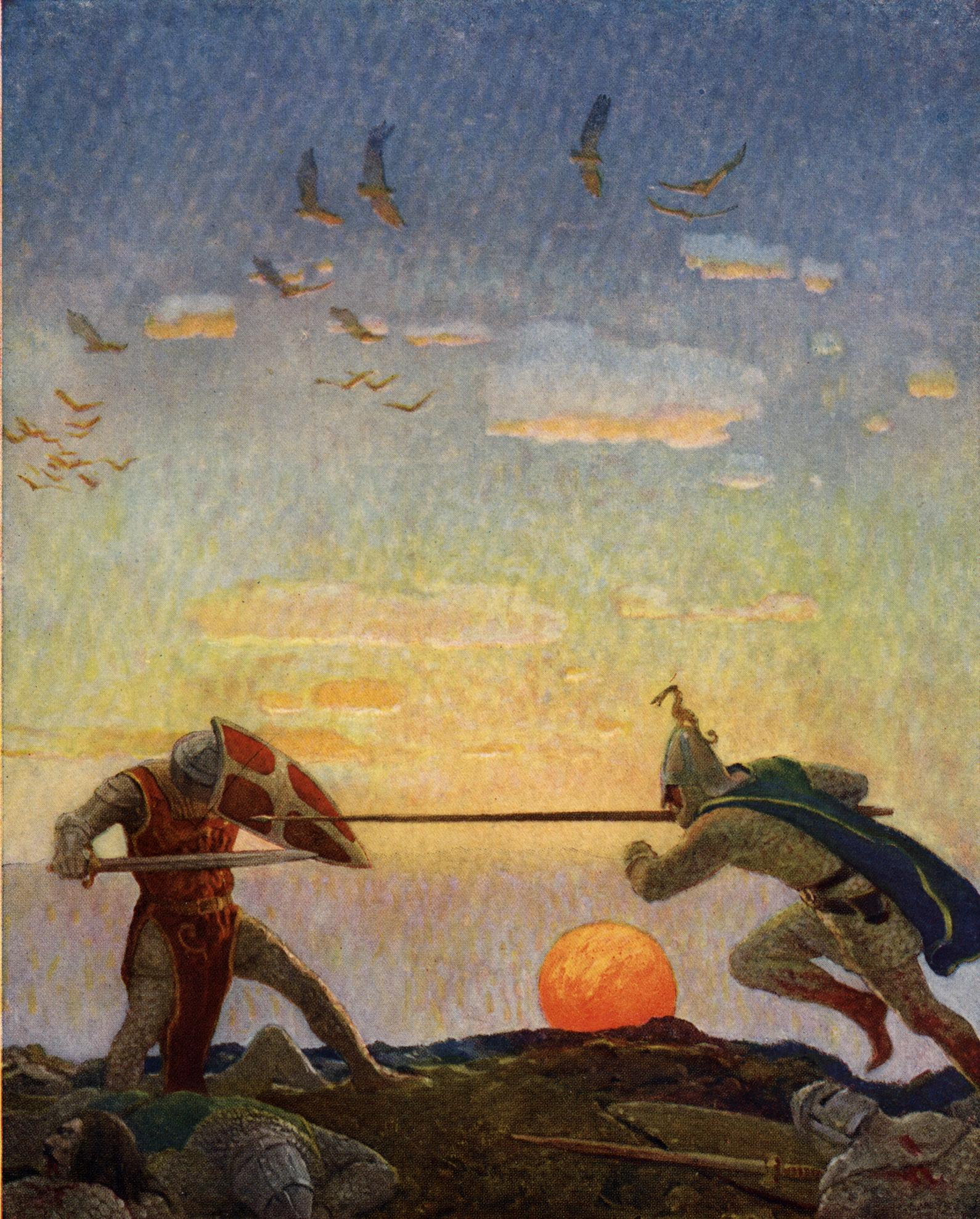
Arthur and Mordred in combat, from Le Morte d'Arthur

== Abaddon Books ==
Paul Finch writes for Abaddon Books, which publishes a number of books with similar themes or in a shared universe.

- Stronghold is in the Tomes of the Dead series, with the linked theme of zombies; each book has an unusual twist on the theme. This story is set in mediaeval Wales, where druids summon an army of the undead to attack the stronghold of the title. (2010, ISBN 978-1907519109)
- Dark North is in the Malory's Knights of Albion series about the knights of King Arthur. The stories come from a fictional sequel to Thomas Malory's Le Morte d'Arthur. (2012, ISBN 978-1907992889 )

== "Heck" novels ==
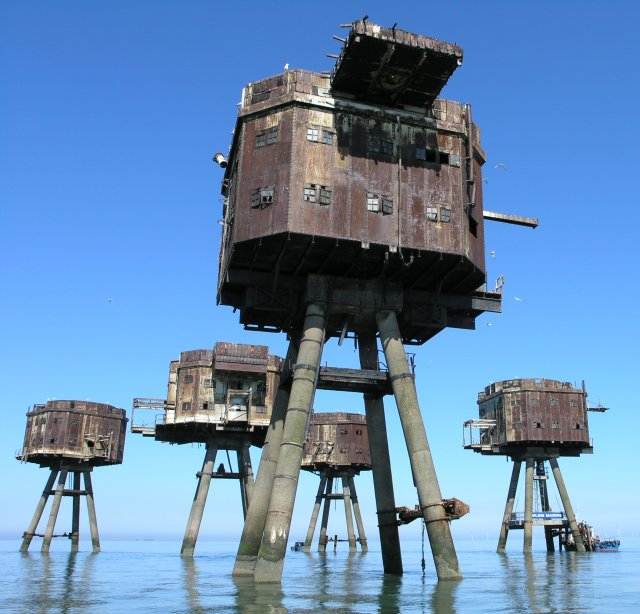
Red Sands Fort - the scene of the finale of Stalkers

1. Stalkers (Avon Books 2013) ISBN 978-0-00-749229-9
2. Sacrifice (Avon Books 2013) ISBN 978-0-00-749231-2
3. The Killing Club (Avon Books 2014) ISBN 978-0-00-755125-5
4. Dead Man Walking (Avon Books 2014) ISBN 978-0-00-755127-9
5. Hunted (Avon Books 2015) ISBN 978-0-00-749233-6
6. Ashes to Ashes (Avon Books 2017) ISBN 978-0-00-755129-3
7. Kiss of Death (Avon Books 2018) ISBN 978-0-00-824398-2

Detective Sergeant Mark Heckenberg, or "Heck", is a British Police Officer and a member of the fictional National Crime Group based at New Scotland Yard. The other constant character in the series is his immediate superior Detective Superintendent Gemma Piper, with whom he has an on and off romantic relationship. In the first book - Stalkers - they investigate the "Nice Guys Club"; a highly secretive organised crime group that provide highly unpleasant sexual services to the very rich. Stalkers became a number one e-book bestseller, selling almost 150,000 copies across e-book and paperback. The second book - Sacrifice - concerns a group that is killing people in a highly graphic way on particular days of the year, such as being burned alive on Guy Fawkes Night. Sacrifice was the most pre-ordered ebook in HarperCollins’ history, with more than 12,825 pre-orders.

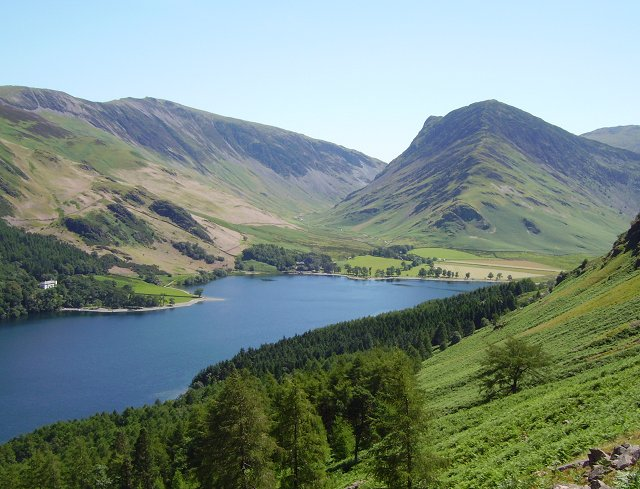
Buttermere in the Lake District - renamed Witch Cradle Tarn in Dead Man Walking

The third book in the series was to have been Hunted and the first two chapters of this appear at the end of Sacrifice. However Paul Finch's publishers Avon Books wanted the return of the "Nice Guys Club" sooner than he had intended. Accordingly, they do in The Killing Club. At the end of this book Heck transfers out of the National Crime Squad. The fourth book in the series is now Dead Man Walking, which is now followed by Hunted. Dead Man Walking is set in the Lake District.

The books are published as eBooks and paperback originals by Avon Books. In 2014 The Sun newspaper gave away free eBooks of Stalkers to its readers. The first 6 chapters of The Killing Club were made available free to download onto Amazon Kindle.

== Lucy Clayburn novels ==
1. Strangers (Avon Books, 2016). ISBN 978-0-00-755131-6
2. Shadows (Avon Books, 2017). ISBN 978-0-00-755133-0
3. Stolen (Avon Books, 2019), ISBN 978-0-00-824401-9

The title character in the Lucy Clayburn series is an efficient detective, promoted from the uniformed constabulary of the Greater Manchester Police, who struggles to overcome the twin burdens of having once made a life-threatening mistake and the knowledge that her estranged father is a vicious gangster.

== Awards and nominations ==
- Nomination: 2000 British Fantasy Award Ordeals, Inc. Best Short Fiction
- Nomination: 2001 British Fantasy Award The Day After the Day the War Ended Best Short Fiction
- Nomination: 2001 British Fantasy Award The Wayside Woods Best Short Fiction
- Win: 2002 British Fantasy Award After Shocks Best Collection Ash Tree Press ISBN 1-55310-021-2
- Nomination: 2002 Bram Stoker Awards Cape Wrath for Best Long Fiction Telos Publishing ISBN 1-903889-60-X
- Nomination: 2002 Bram Stoker Awards Long Meg and Her Daughters Superior Achievement in Long Fiction
- Nomination: 2003 British Fantasy Award Cape Wrath Best Short Fiction Telos Publishing ISBN 1-903889-60-X
- Win: 2006 International Horror Guild Award The Old North Road Best Mid-length Fiction
- Win: 2007 British Fantasy Award Kid Best Novella
- Nomination: 2007 International Horror Guild Award The Tank Best Short Form
- Nomination: 2011 British Fantasy Award Sparrowhawk: A Victorian Ghost Story Best Novella Pendragon Press ISBN 978-1-906864-25-5
- Nomination: 2011 British Fantasy Award Walkers in the Dark Best Collection Ash Tree Press ISBN 978-1-55310-125-3
- Nomination: 2011 British Fantasy Award One Monster Is Not Enough Best Collection Grey Friar Press ISBN 978-1-906331-20-7

== Critical reception ==
John Pelan in a review of After Shocks said, "I'll go out on a bit of a limb here and say that I think that Finch owes far more to Sheridan Le Fanu than to M R James. A main strength of Finch's work is his deft portrayal of classic supernatural creatures of myth such as the pooka, goblins and dandy dogs, and the incorporation of local legends and mythology was one that certainly served Le Fanu well."

Dan Howarth in his review of Sparrowhawk for the website This Is Horror said, "One of the principal triumphs of Sparrowhawk is how the story captures the sense of Christmas. The images of deep snow drifts and produce on display in the markets are brilliantly festive, yet Finch still manages to create a sense of terror that holds true to the Victorian spirit of the Christmas ghost story. The scares in the book are sharp and perfectly accentuate a measured and believably atmosphere of dread."

David Marshall wrote about Dark North, "The chase away from the battlefield and into the foothills of the Alps is a magnificently sustained piece of writing."

== Personal life ==
Finch and his wife Catherine live in Standish, Greater Manchester; he has two children, Eleanor and Harry.
