= The Mist and the Maiden =

- Theatrical release poster
- Spanish: La niebla y la doncella
- Directed by: Andrés Koppel
- Screenplay by: Andrés Koppel
- Based on: La niebla y la doncella by Lorenzo Silva
- Produced by: Gerardo Herrero; Mikel Lejarza; Mercedes Gamero
- Starring: Quim Gutiérrez; Verónica Echegui; Aura Garrido; Roberto Álamo; Sanny van Heteren; Cristóbal Pinto; Marian Álvarez
- Cinematography: Álvaro Gutiérrez
- Edited by: Irene Blecua
- Production companies: Tornasol Films; Hernández y Fernández PC; Gomera Producciones; Atresmedia Cine
- Distributed by: DeAPlaneta
- Release dates: 19 March 2017 (Málaga); 1 September 2017 (Spain)
- Country: Spain
- Language: Spanish

The Mist and the Maiden (Spanish: La niebla y la doncella), aka Mist & the Maiden, is a 2017 mystery thriller film directed and written by Andrés Koppel which stars Quim Gutiérrez, Verónica Echegui, Aura Garrido, and Roberto Álamo. It is an adaptation of Lorenzo Silva's novel.

== Plot ==
The plot takes place in the small mountainous island of La Gomera (Canary Islands archipelago). It concerns the criminal investigation carried out by Guardia Civil Sergeant Rubén Bevilacqua and Corporal Virginia Chamorro, who seek to reopen a case pertaining the discovery of a male corpse, Ivan, in the hazy forest of the island's centre, three years before. To that end, they get in touch with the local Corporal Ruth Anglada, the last person to see the man alive. In the course of the investigation, a quintet of characters are involved in affairs and murder. The Sergeant and Corporal Anglada have feelings for each other, although hers may be to divert him from his investigation.

After various travels to Tenerife and back, the plot begins to resolve when it emerges that all is not right on the island. Ivan, the deceased, was a male gigolo, supporting his German mother Margarethe who knew of his activities, some with underage girls, but needed money. He was also known for having access to drugs given to him by a girlfriend, 'the daughter of the Mambo King, a drug dealer'. It was Anglada who eventually killed Ivan because he was blackmailing the police chief Navas played by Roberto Álamo, who had been paid off by the Mambo King to keep quiet about his drug dealings. It emerged Anglada remained in love with this police chief over the years, and had returned to her island birthplace some years ago, from service in Afghanistan, because of him. This illicit affair may have been the second source of blackmail since the chief had a wife (Carmen) and daughter.

His wife Carmen agrees to testify against the chief when his crimes are discovered and they are cornered on a ferry to Tenerife. Ivan also slept with Anglada three years ago - this is why she was the last to see him alive, phone footage reveals. Murder number two is an act of revenge - Ivan's mother Margarethe kills Anglada in her car off camera, and is arrested for murder. The film leaves confusion about some motivations for these two killings, and the somewhat inexplicable affairs between the major characters. In an unsatisfactory ending, Sergeant Rubén is about to leave the windy island for his wife and kids in Spain, presumably with his own affair forgotten and his reputation intact.

== Cast ==
- Verónica Echegui as Ruth Anglada
- Quim Gutiérrez as sargento Rubén Bevilacqua
- Aura Garrido as Virginia Chamorro
- Roberto Álamo as teniente Navas
- Marian Álvarez as Carmen
- Sanny van Heteren as Margarethe von Amsberg
- Fernando Navas as Padilla
- Cristóbal Pinto
- Paola Bontempi
- Alba Tonini

== Production ==
Andrés Koppel directorial debut feature, the film was produced by Tornasol Films, Hernández y Fernández PC, Gomera Producciones, and Atresmedia Cine, with the participation of Atresmedia and Movistar+. Shooting locations included the islands of La Gomera and Tenerife.

== Release ==
The film was presented at the 20th Málaga Film Festival on 19 March 2017. Distributed by DeAPlaneta, it was theatrically released in Spain on 1 September 2017.

== Reception ==
Beatriz Martínez of Fotogramas considered that a big list of flaws and dissonant elements that include "bad performances, a script that cannot be understood, clumsy filming, ridiculous scenes, and impostured dialogues" turn the mystery thriller into an unintentional comedy.

Marta Medina of El Confidencial found the film's main flaw to be how "cumbersome and impossible" the narrative becomes as the investigation advances, with the underlying feeling upon watching the film being that of "a poorly-told good story".

Raquel Hernández Luján of HobbyConsolas rated the film with 45 points ("bad"), deeming it to be a "deficient" adaptation from which little can be saved, singling out Aura Garrido and the spectacular locations as positive points, but criticising elements such as the sound, editing, the "completely illogical and meaningless" plot resolution and the gratuitousness of the sex scenes.

Andrea G. Bermejo of Cinemanía rated the film 2½ out of 5 stars, underscoring as a verdict the film to be a "rounded and attractive thriller hampered by the 'star system'".

Luis Martínez of El Mundo rated the film 3 out of 5 stars, writing about an "imperfect, slightly inclined to pompousness" film, otherwise featuring a "stiff script", yet also about an "effective (perhaps too much in its attempt to reproduce archetypes) and perfectly murky thriller", also bringing together the best actors of the Spanish star system.

== See also ==
- List of Spanish films of 2017
