= Hamilton Film Festival =

Canadian film festival

- Festival Logo
- Location: Hamilton, Ontario, Canada
- Founded: 2004
- Most recent: 2024
- Directors: Nathan Fleet
- Festival date: Annually in October
- Language: English, International
- Website: hamiltonfilmfestival.com

Hamilton Film Festival is an international film festival held annually in Hamilton, Ontario, Canada. It stages an annual program of independent feature and short films, with a particular but not exclusive focus on films with direct production connections to the city.

The event is a qualifying festival for the Canadian Screen Awards, is recognized by the Directors Guild of Canada and has been cited as one of the top 250 international film festivals.

== History ==
The festival was launched in 2004 by the city's Staircase Theatre, following the theatre's participation the previous year in the Travelling Film Festival, an event which toured a program of Canadian films to a variety of locations across the country. A second event was then staged in 2005. Due to organizational issues at the Staircase Theatre, however, it then went on hiatus for the next two years until returning in 2008, and has been presented annually since then.

In 2014, due to the festival's growing size it began adding screening venues in addition to the Staircase, including The Zoetic and the Factory Media Centre. In 2020, due to the COVID-19 pandemic the festival added some drive-in and online screenings, and imposed social distancing restrictions on theatrical screenings for audience safety, but was able to proceed with these precautions.

Current venues include the Staircase, Ancaster Memorial Arts Centre, Playhouse Cinema and the Westdale, as well as short film programs being broadcast on Cable 14, the city's cable television community channel.

== Awards ==
As of 2024, Hamilton Film Festival awards the following categories:

- Best Feature
- Best Short
- Performance in a Feature
- Performance in a Short
- Screenplay
- Cinematography
- Sound
- Effects
- Music
- Production Design
- Emerging / Student
- Sparquie the Squirrel
- Truly Independent

== See also ==
- List of film festivals in Canada
