= Brain Dead (2007 film) =

- Directed by: Kevin S. Tenney
- Written by: Dale Gelineau
- Produced by: Kevin S. Tenney; Daniel Duncan; Dennis Michael Tenney
- Starring: Joshua Benton; Sarah Grant Brendecke; Michelle Tomlinson; David Crane; Andy Forrest; Cristina Tiberia
- Cinematography: Patrick MacGowan; Alex Simon
- Edited by: William Daniels
- Music by: Dennis Michael Tenney
- Production companies: Monogram; Prodigy Entertainment; Motor Pictures
- Distributed by: Shoreline Entertainment
- Release date: October 17, 2007 (Terror Film Festival)
- Running time: 92 minutes
- Country: United States
- Language: English

Brain Dead is a 2007 American horror comedy film directed by Kevin S. Tenney, written by Dale Gelineau, and starring Joshua Benton, Sarah Grant Brendecke, Michelle Tomlinson, David Crane, Andy Forrest, and Cristina Tiberia. Christians, sorority sisters, and escaped convicts attempt to defend themselves against a zombie attack.

== Plot ==
When a meteor strikes a man on the head, alien slugs take over his brain and turn him into a ravenous zombie. As a group of sorority sisters, born-again Christians, and escaped convicts converge in the remote area where he lives, he attacks them all.

== Cast ==
- Joshua Benton as Clarence Singer
- Sarah Grant Brendecke as Sherry Morgan
- Michelle Tomlinson as Claudia Bush
- David Crane as Bob Jules
- Andy Forrest as Reverend Farnsworth
- Cristina Tiberia as Amy Smoots
- Jim Wynorski (cameo)
- Dennis Michael Tenney (cameo)

== Production ==
Brain Dead was shot in Alameda, California. It was the first film that Tenney shot digitally. Shooting took 18 days. The original concept involved spiders, but it was rewritten to feature zombies after budget constraints made spiders impractical.

== Release ==
Brain Dead played in many festivals in 2007 and 2008. On March 20, 2009, it received a limited theatrical release. It was released on home video on October 12, 2010.

== Reception ==
Dennis Harvey of Variety called it "watchably forgettable". Andrew Mack of Twitch Film wrote that the film "scraped the bottom of the zombie barrel". Serena Whitney of Dread Central rated it 2.5/5 stars and called it disappointing compared to its influences but fun to watch with friends. Shock Till You Drop wrote, "If gratuitous boob shots (every actress but one shows all), blood and exploding heads are what you want then this delivers." Marc Patterson of Brutal As Hell wrote, "this sickening little bit of splat-stick makes for a perfect evening of brain dead fun." Kurt Dahlke of DVD Talk rated it 3/5 stars and wrote, "Though cheekily derivative, larded with plenty of dopey humor, and not-exactly packed with great performances, Brain Dead still packs a fun punch." Bill Gibron, also of DVD Talk, rated it 3.5/5 stars and called it a near-classic that is a bit too clever for its own good. Peter Dendle wrote, "Tenney is talented and obviously knows how to work within a budget".
