= Eel Girl =

- Directed by: Paul Campion
- Written by: Paul Campion
- Produced by: Jenn Scheer; Elisabeth Pinto
- Starring: Julia Rose; Euan Dempsey; Nick Blake; Robyn Paterson
- Cinematography: Richard Bluck
- Edited by: Jeff Hurrell
- Music by: Paul Sanford
- Production company: Nimble Pictures
- Release date: 14 July 2008
- Running time: 5 minutes 18 seconds
- Countries: New Zealand; United Kingdom
- Language: English

Eel Girl is a 2008 horror science fiction short film written and directed by Paul Campion, in which a scientist becomes obsessed with an apparent human-eel hybrid woman being studied in a Naval research facility.

The film stars Julia Rose and Euan Dempsey, and was shot in Wellington, New Zealand. The special makeup effects were created by New Zealand-based company Weta Workshop, for which Campion also works.

Eel Girl has been played extensively in film festivals, winning 13 awards and several nominations in various categories and festivals.

== Plot: ==
Deep in a secret navy research facility, an armed security officer enters a secure observation room, filled with electronic monitoring equipment and shelves full of dissected fish specimens. The officer requests one of the scientists accompany her immediately. He protests, quoting navy protocols that require two people to remain in the room at all times, but the officer makes sure he knows he has no choice.

The remaining scientist watches them leave the facility on a security monitor. Satisfied he's on his own, he quickly begins to activate override commands on the computer. A warning begins to sound, and the scientist steps back to stand in front of a large observation window, which looks into a dark tiled and dirty room, in the center of which stands a large bath, filled with a black viscous liquid. Opposite the window is a large secure door, above which warning lights flash red, then green. The scientist becomes more agitated, breathing heavily, as he sees the door open, and a webbed hand curls around the door frame.

Out of the darkness appears the Eel Girl, naked, her skin pale, with gills visible in her cheeks, and small fins on her forearms. Slowly she steps into the room, walks around the bath. The scientist watches as she slides into the thick black liquid. In the observation room the computer begins to flash warnings. Distracted by the computer, the scientist doesn't notice the Eel Girl climb slowly out of the bath. She steps up to the window, places her hands against the glass and looks through. The scientist sees her, moves to the window, and places his hands against hers through the glass. She stares back, mouth opening and closing slowly, revealing rows of sharp teeth.

She signals with her eyes, and the scientist moves to the security door that connects his room to hers. He activates the security code and opens the door. Inside she is waiting for him. He walks into the room and embraces her. She reaches up, gently holds the back of his head with one hand. Suddenly her jaw extends and she shoves his head into her mouth, then lifts him into the air and swallows him whole, vomiting his shredded clothes. She climbs back into the bathtub and lies there, caressing her now massively enlarged belly, and the scientist inside still alive.

== Cast: ==
- Julia Rose as Eel Girl
- Euan Dempsy as Obsessed Scientist
- Robyn Paterson as Female Military Officer
- Nick Blake as Senior Scientist

== Awards: ==
- 2012 Shocker Award - Knoxville Horror Film Festival, United States
- 2009 Honorable Mention - Best Short Film, Philadelphia Independent Film Festival, United States
- 2009 Best Director, Landcrab Film Festival, England
- 2009 Best Special Effects, Landcrab Film Festival, England
- 2009 Best Special Effects, Backseat Film Festival, United States
- 2009 Sci-Fi London Horror Award, London Short Film Festival, England
- 2008 Canal+ Cocette Minute, Brest European Short Film Festival, France
- 2008 Grand Prix, Court Metrange Short Film Festival, France
- 2008 Best Special FX, Rhode Island Horror Film Festival, United States
- 2008 Best Visual Effects, A Night of Horror Film Festival, Australia
- 2008 Best Special Effects, Dark Carnival Film Festival, USA
- 2008 Best Fx, Eerie HorrorFilm Festival, USA
- 2008 Best Super Short, Shriekfest Film Festival, USA
- 2008 Best Visual Effects, Tabloid Witch Awards, USA
- 2008 Honorable Mention, Tabloid Witch Awards, USA
- 2008 Best Short Film, HP Lovecraft Film Festival, USA
- 2008 Best Special Effects, HP Lovecraft Film Festival, USA
- 2008 Best Comedy, HP Lovecraft Film Festival, USA

== Nominations: ==
- 2009 UK Film Council Award for Best Film, London Short Film Festival, England
- 2008 Outstanding Technical Achievement in a Short Film, Qantas Film and Television Awards, New Zealand
- 2008 Best Short Film, Rushes Soho Shorts Film Festival, England
- 2008 Best Cinematography, Dark Carnival Film Festival, USA
- 2008 Best Special Effects, Terror Film Festival, USA
- 2008 Best Music Score, Terror Film Festival, USA

== Festival screenings: ==
- 2008 London International Festival of Science-Fiction and Fantastic Film.
- 2008 Shriekfest Los Angeles
- 2008 Israel Fantastic Film Festival, Tel-Aviv
- 2008 Evergreen Film Festival, Korea
- 2008 Ravenna Nightmare Fest, Italy
- 2008 Fancine Film Festival, Malaga, Spain
- 2008 Amberg Horror Festival, Germany
- 2008 Terror Film Festival
- 2009 Tabloid Witch Awards
- 2008 Brest European Film Festival
- 2008 Rio de Janeiro International Short Film Festival
- 2008 Leeds International Film Festival, England
- 2008 San Sebastian Horror & Fantasy Film Festival, Spain
- 2008 Court Metrange Film Festival, France
- 2008 Sitges Film Festival, Catalonia, Spain
- 2008 Dark Carnival Film Festival
- 2008 HP Lovecraft Film Festival
- 2008 Rhode Island International Film Festival, USA
- 2008 PiFan, South Korea
- 2008 Fantasia Film Festival, Montreal, Canada
- 2008 Fright Night, USA
- 2008 Dragon*Con, USA
- 2008 The San Francisco Short Film Festival, USA
- 2008 Homegrown Film Festival, New Zealand
- 2008 Rushes Soho Shorts, London, England
- 2008 Show Me Shorts, New Zealand
- 2008 Seattle True Independent Film Festival, USA
- 2008 A Night of Horror Film Festival, Sydney, Australia
- 2008 Fantastic Fest, Austin, Texas, USA
- 2009 London Short Film Festival, England
- 2009 Amsterdam Fantastic Film Festival
- 2009 Brussels Fantastic Film Festival
- 2009 Dresden International Short Film Festival
- 2009 Worldwide Short Film Festival, Toronto, Canada
- 2009 OneDotZero
- 2010 BoneBat Comedy of Horrors Film Festival, Redmond, WA, USA
- 2017 Desert Flower Art Bar Mini Short Film Festival, Big Spring, Texas, USA
- 2017 Dusk Till Dawn Horror Fest, Dixon, Illinois, USA
- 2017 Short Sounds Film Festival, Bournemouth, England
- 2020 Nosferatu Film Festival, Doncaster, England

== See also: ==
- Harpya
- Jenifer (Masters of Horror episode)
- Shambleau
- Tomie

== External links: ==
- Eel Girl at IMDb
- Eel Girl - Short Film – via www.paulcampion.com.
- Molloy, Matt (2010). "paul campion: jack of all trades". SCARS Magazine. 03 (02): 19–22.
