= Night of the Hell Hamsters =

- Directed by: Paul Campion
- Written by: Hadyn Green; Mike Roseingrave; Paul Campion
- Produced by: Elisabeth Pinto
- Starring: Stephanie Ratcliff; Paul O'Neill
- Cinematography: Ben Robinson; Jono Smith
- Edited by: Rob Hall
- Music by: Andrea Possee
- Release dates: 23 September 2006 (FantasyCon Short Film Showcase); 4 October 2007 (United Kingdom)
- Running time: 16 minutes
- Countries: United Kingdom; New Zealand
- Language: English

Night of the Hell Hamsters is a 2006 comedy horror short film in which demonically possessed hamsters terrorize a young babysitter and her boyfriend.

== Plot ==
Karl pays his girlfriend Julie a surprise visit while she is babysitting her neighbour's children. He brings with him a Ouija board that Julie has been asking to play with. However, unhappy about messing around with the occult, Karl has deliberately left the board at home. Determined to have her way, Julie fashions a makeshift Ouija board out of an innocent child's alphabet toy, and, when Karl is bitten by one of the hamsters, she uses a drop of his blood to consecrate it. The couple then attempt to summon up a spirit, unaware that they have come up with the name of a demon, which arrives in a bolt of lightning, electrocuting the family hamsters and then possessing their dead bodies, turning them into demonic possessed zombie hamsters .

== Cast ==
- Stephanie Ratcliff as Julie
- Paul O'Neill as Karl
- Director Paul Campion and producer Elisabeth Pinto play two of the Giant Zombie Rabbits in the intro sequence.

== Awards ==
- 2007 Best Horror Film, Vine Short Film Festival, USA.
- 2007 Best Director, A Night of Horror Short Film Festival, Australia.
- 2007 Audience Favourite, Zompire: The Undead Film Festival, USA.
- 2007 Audience Favourite, Big Mountain Short Film Festival, New Zealand.
- 2007 Best Cinematography, Tabloid Witch Awards, USA.
- 2007 Honorable Mention, Tabloid Witch Awards, USA.

== Nominations ==
- 2007 Best Short Film, Terror Film Festival, USA.
- 2007 Best Editing, Terror Film Festival, USA.
- 2007 Best Music Score, Terror Film Festival, USA.
- 2007 Best Special Effects, Terror Film Festival, USA.
