= Family Demons =

- Theatrical release poster
- Directed by: Ursula Dabrowsky
- Written by: Ursula Dabrowsky
- Produced by: Sue Brown
- Starring: Cassandra Kane; Kerry Reid
- Cinematography: Hugh Freytag
- Edited by: Chop Suzee
- Music by: Michael Taylor
- Production company: Saylavee Productions
- Distributed by: IFM World Releasing
- Release date: 27 March 2009
- Running time: 80 minutes
- Country: Australia
- Language: English
- Budget: A$6,500

Family Demons is a 2009 Australian horror film written and directed by Ursula Dabrowsky and starring Cassandra Kane, Kerry Reid, and Alex Rafalowicz.

== Plot ==
Teenage Billie endures a miserable existence with her alcoholic mother. She is cruelly punished every day, both physically and emotionally just for being born (she was born from rape). She has never been to school, she is not allowed to get a job, and she is not permitted to leave the house... ever. As such, Billie's bizarre upbringing has resulted in her becoming a virtual prisoner in her own home. No friends, no outside contacts, just her drunken mother.

During one of her mother's three-day drinking binges, a starving Billie sneaks out of the house in search of food as there are no groceries. Billie finds her way to the local store and buys food, but on her way back home she is attacked by a gang of thugs.

Seeing Billie outnumbered and in trouble, the next-door neighbor Sean tries to protect her while she makes her escape and Billie runs home. Unfortunately, her mother catches her coming in the house and she is chained to the laundry sink as punishment.

Hearing Billie's cries for help, Sean breaks into the house and frees her. The two of them have a day of fun together, but her mother discovers this and gets angry. A violent struggle ensues and during this, Billie's repressed anger is unleashed and in her fury she pushes her mother, knocking her head on the corner of the table.

Sean arrives and helps Billie bring her mother to the hospital. Sean offers to take her away and as she waits at home, her mother suddenly appears and attacks her. Billie runs and eventually kills her in fear, burying the body in the backyard.

Sean still hasn't arrived and the phone rings. The doctor informs Billie that her mother has died. Frightened, she runs into the backyard to dig up the body. It's Sean; she cries. Billie is next shown giving birth in her bathroom, alone. Time skips to a few years later, Billie's daughter, chained up like she was, watches as Billie pours herself a drink and stares drunkenly at her, like her mother did.

== Cast ==
- Cassandra Kane as Billie
- Kerry Reid as The Mother
- Alex Rafalowicz as Sean
- Tommy Darwin as The Mother's Boyfriend

== Production ==
The film was shot for two weeks in January 2006 on a minuscule budget of $6,500 in one of the worst heat waves to hit Adelaide, South Australia in 30 years.

In November 2009, IFM World Releasing acquired distribution rights. Family Demons is similar in tone to The Sixth Sense and The Others with thematic and visual references harking back to Brian De Palma's horror classic, Carrie and contemporary Asian ghost stories, such as The Grudge and A Tale of Two Sisters.

The movie won at Fright Night Film Festival two Awards "Best Foreign Feature" and Cassandra Kane as "Best Actress".

== Release ==
Despite the constraints, this 'Downbeat Wonder' has garnered several awards at international film festivals, including Best Australian Director at the 2009 Night of Horror Film Festival in Sydney and was nominated as a finalist in the 2009 DigiSPAA awards.

== See also ==
- Cinema of Australia
