= The Naughty List =

- Film poster
- Directed by: Paul Campion
- Written by: Paul Campion
- Produced by: Michelle Cullen; Paul Campion
- Starring: Vincenzo Nicoli; Sebastian Knapp; Mac Elsey
- Cinematography: Jono Smith
- Edited by: Rob Hall
- Music by: Andrea Possee
- Distributed by: YouTube
- Release date: 22 December 2016
- Running time: 8 minutes 34 seconds
- Country: United Kingdom
- Language: English

The Naughty List is a 2016 Black comedy short film written and directed by Paul Campion, about two American mobsters who come face to face with Santa Claus on Christmas Eve, and discover what it really takes to get on his Naughty or Nice list.

The film is based on the short story The Siqquism Who Stole Christmas, by author Brian Keene. It was produced by Michelle Cullen and Paul Campion, and was shot in Camberwell Film Studios, England.

== Cast ==
- Vincenzo Nicoli as Tony Genova
- Sebastian Knapp as Vince Napoli
- Mac Elsey as Santa Claus

== Festival Screenings ==
- One-Reeler Short Film Competition - Online, USA, January 2017
- FILMSshort Competition - Finalist - Online, UK, February 2017
- Midwest WeirdFest - Eau Claire, Wisconsin, USA, March 2017
- Bonebat Comedy of Horrors Film Fest - Seattle, Washington, USA, April 2017
- Austin Comedy Short Film Festival - Austin, Texas, USA, April 2017
- Comicpalooza Film Festival - Houston, Texas, USA, May 2017
- CyberiaVR - San Francisco, California, USA, May 2017
- Fantasia Film Festival - Montreal, Canada, July 2017
- GenreBlast Film Festival - Winchester, Virginia, USA, September 2017
- Nightmares Film Festival - Columbus, Ohio, USA, October 2017
- Another Hole in the Head - San Francisco, California, USA, October 2017
- FKM, Fantastic Film Festival - La Coruña, Spain, October 2017
- Dead Witch Film Festival - Newnan, Georgia, USA, November 2017
- Freedom Shorts - Philadelphia, Pennsylvania, USA, November 2017
- Buried Alive Film Fest - Atlanta, Georgia, USA, November 2017
- Lancaster International Short Film Festival - Lancaster, Pennsylvania, USA, November 2017
- Fantastic Planet Film Festival - Sydney, Australia, December 2017
- Stark County International Short Film Series - Canton, Ohio, USA, December 2017
- Yubari Fantastic Film Festival - Yubari, Hokkaido, March 2018
- Weihnachts Film Festival - Berlin, Germany, December 2018
- iShorts - Czech Republic and Slovakia, December 2018
- BizarroCon - Portland, Oregon, USA, January 2019
- Phoenix Comedy Short Film Festival - Phoenix, Arizona, USA, April 2019

== Awards ==
- One-Reeler Short Film Competition - Award of Excellence
- Best Ensemble Cast - The Austin Comedy Short Film Festival, 2017

== Nominations ==
- Best Original Music - The Austin Comedy Short Film Festival, 2017
- Best Comedy Short Film - The Austin Comedy Short Film Festival, 2017
- Best Screenplay - Short Film - GenreBlast Film Festival, 2017
- Funniest Short Film - GenreBlast Film Festival, 2017
- Best Overall Short Film - GenreBlast Film Festival, 2017
- Best Horror Comedy Short - Nightmares Film Festival, 2017
