= HorrorScope (webzine) =

- Website type: Dark fiction news and reviews
- Owner: Brimstone Press
- Creator: Shane Jiraiya Cummings
- Editor: Shane Jiraiya Cummings
- Website: ozhorrorscope.blogspot.com
- Launched: August 2005
- Current status: Defunct, as of 17 May 2011

HorrorScope: The Australian Dark Fiction Web Log was a news and review webzine dedicated to horror literature and movies. The zine was created by Australian independent publisher Brimstone Press in August 2005. HorrorScope and its editors have won two Ditmar Awards (Australian Science Fiction Achievement Awards) and attracted several award nominations.

== Publication history ==
The zine is edited by a group of reviewers. Led by founder and managing editor Shane Jiraiya Cummings, foundational staff writers included Stephanie Gunn, A D John, Andrew J McKiernan, Miranda Siemienowicz, Mark Smith-Briggs, and Matthew Tait. Heather Gammage joined the staff in December 2006.

The Australian Horror Writers Association's news service was amalgamated with HorrorScope in March 2007. With AHWA news editor Talie Helene joining the HorrorScope editorial team, the combined serviced provided a single, streamlined source for Australian horror publishing news. Award-winning horror writer and critic Robert Hood joined the HorrorScope team in August 2007.

Aside from regular news items and reviews of books, magazines, and movies, HorrorScope has published interviews with notable Australian and international horror and speculative fiction authors such as RL Stine, Will Elliott, Stephen Dedman, Martin Livings, Brett McBean, Rocky Wood, Queenie Chan, Jason Nahrung, and David Conyers.

== Awards ==
=== Wins ===
- 2007 Ditmar Award, Fanzine: HorrorScope (ed. Shane Jiraiya Cummings et al.)
- 2006 Ditmar Award, Fan Writer: Shane Jiraiya Cummings (HorrorScope)

=== Nominations ===
- 2007 William Atheling Jr Award: Paraspheres review by Miranda Siemienowicz (HorrorScope)
- 2007 Ditmar Award, Fan Writer: Shane Jiraiya Cummings (HorrorScope)
- 2007 Ditmar Award, Fan Writer: Stephanie Gunn (HorrorScope)
- 2007 Ditmar Award, Fan Writer: Miranda Siemienowicz (HorrorScope)
- 2007 Ditmar Award, Fan Writer: Mark Smith-Briggs (HorrorScope)
- 2007 Ditmar Award, Fan Writer: Matthew Tait (HorrorScope)
- 2006 Ditmar Award, Fanzine: HorrorScope (ed. Shane Jiraiya Cummings et al.)
- 2006 Ditmar Award, Fan Writer: Shane Jiraiya Cummings (HorrorScope)
- 2006 Ditmar Award, Fan Writer: Stephanie Gunn (HorrorScope)
- 2009 Ditmar Award, Fan Writer: Chuck McKenzie (HorrorScope)
- 2010 Ditmar Award, Fan Writer: Chuck McKenzie (HorrorScope)
