= FrightFest (film festival) =

Film festival

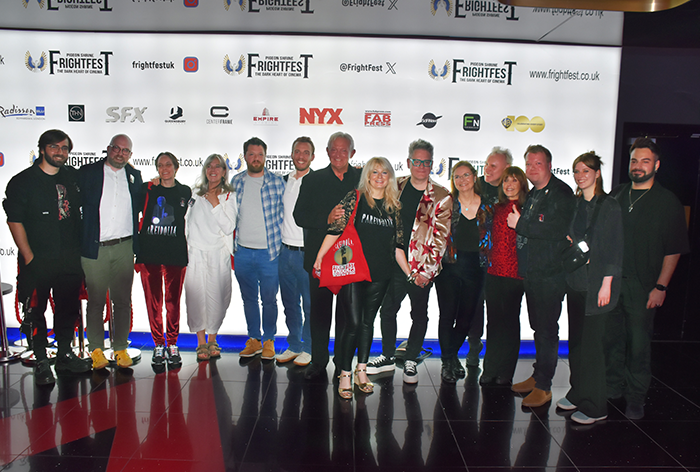
- Pareidolia cast and crew at FrightFest The cast and crew of Pareidolia at FrightFest 2023
- Status: Active
- Genre: Film festival
- Dates: August, October
- Frequency: Annually
- Venue: Vue Cinema, Leicester Square
- Locations: London, Glasgow
- Country: UK
- Years active: 26
- Inaugurated: August 2000
- Website: frightfest.co.uk

FrightFest, also known as Arrow Video FrightFest, is an annual film festival held in London and Glasgow. The festival holds three major events each year: a festival running five days over the UK late August Bank Holiday weekend, a Halloween event held in London in late October, and a festival in Glasgow held around February as part of the Glasgow Film Festival.

The first event was held in London in 2000 and the first Glasgow festival was held in 2006. As its name indicates, FrightFest's primary focus is on the horror film genre. However, the event regularly features documentaries, science fiction and thriller films.

== History ==
FrightFest was founded by film producer Paul McEvoy, film distributor Ian Rattray, and journalist and film critic Alan Jones, and television PR specialist Greg Day. Paul McEvoy has stated that his initial idea for FrightFest "came from my love and admiration for the seminal 'Shock Around The Clock' events of the 1980s organised by Stefan Jaworszyn and Alan Jones." The first event was in 2000 held at the Princes Charles cinema in London screening a selection of films over the August bank holiday. In an interview with Starburst magazine, Alan Jones explained:

Because I’d been a journalist for so long, I knew the film companies to talk to about getting films. It was easy enough. The reason we put it on the August bank holiday weekend really was because I live very near the Notting Hill Gate carnival – hate it – and wanted something to do, and thought there are other people as well who just couldn’t bear the carnival and the fact it took over the whole of London. So here was an alternative. We got a really good audience the first year and looking back, it’s grown and grown to where we are now.

— Martin Unsworth, Alan Jones | Film 4 FrightFest, Starburst

Poster and logo designs are provided by the artist Graham Humphreys.

== Direction ==
FrightFest is directed by Paul McEvoy, Ian Rattray and Alan Jones. In 2006, Greg Day joined the company as a co-director. McEvoy and Jones are heavily involved in the selection process for films and this can involve scouting other film festivals but watching all submissions that are made online.

It is managed by the co-directors and two co-festival managers, and events are coordinated by volunteers. The FrightFest Advisory Board also includes those in the film industry professionals and previous FrightFest staff or volunteers, in voluntary positions.

FrightFest has had a number of different sponsors over the span of its life, including the Horror Channel, Film4, Volkswagen Lupo, Bizarre magazine (of which the August issue was given away free), Xfm, Zone Horror and Play.com.

== Festival programme ==
The objective of FrightFest is to "provide the UK with a horror fantasy festival similar to the market leaders in Europe, Sitges (Spain) and Brussels (Belgium)." FrightFest is organised in various strands:

Main Festival
Event	Notes
FrightFest London	Takes place over 5 days showcasing horror, sci-fi, thriller and documentary films in August each year
Mini-Festivals
FrightFest Glasgow	Mini-festival event at Glasgow Film Theatre taking place over 3 days in March each year
FrightFest Halloween	Mini events that take place over Halloween each year at the ODEON Luxe West End on Leicester Square, London
Other Events
'Terror-thon'	A regular two-day screening at the Glasgow Film Festival in February each year
Special events	FrightFest organises a number of special events, and has in the past hosted Dario Argento at the Coronet, HOSTEL Day, An Evening with Jessica Alba and COLD IN JULY with director Jim Mickle

== Awards ==
FrightFest does not give out its own awards for the films selected and screened during the festival.

=== Total Film FrightFest Awards ===
Total Film publish their own awards for the festival, independent of FrightFest. Categories include: Best Film, Best Director, Best Actor, Best Actress, Best Monster, Best Death, Best Scare, Best Gore, Best Gross-Out, Best WTF Twist, and Best for Striking Originality.

This is the list of winners for Best Film:

Year	Film
2019	Bliss
2020	A Ghost Waits
2022	Next Exit
2023	Where The Devil Roams
2024	A Desert

== Past Awards ==
The Screen International partnered with FrightFest from 2016 to 2022 when the festival was sponsored by Arrow Video, and presented The Screen International Rising Star Award to celebrate the work of emerging UK genre talent.

=== The Screen International Rising Star Award ===
Year	Nominees	Winner
2016	Alice Lowe, Paul Hyett, The Ford Brothers, Kate Shenton and Shaun Robert Smith	Alice Lowe for Prevenge
2017	Tom Paton, Dominic Bridges, Joanne Mitchell, Matthew Holness and Danny Morgan	Danny Morgan for Double Date
2018	Kevin Chicken, Aislinn Clarke, Mike Mort, Hannah Arterton, Ella Hunt, Sam Gittins and Marcia Do Vales	Ella Hunt for Anna And The Apocalypse
2019	Abigail Blackmore, Staten Cousins-Roe, Rebecca Rogers, Jack McHenry and Fredi Nwaka	Abigail Blackmore for Tales from the Lodge
2021	Prano Bailey-Bond, Leroy Kincaide, Eric Steele, April Pearson and Najarra Townsend	Prano Bailey-Bond for Censor

== London Festival Line-ups ==
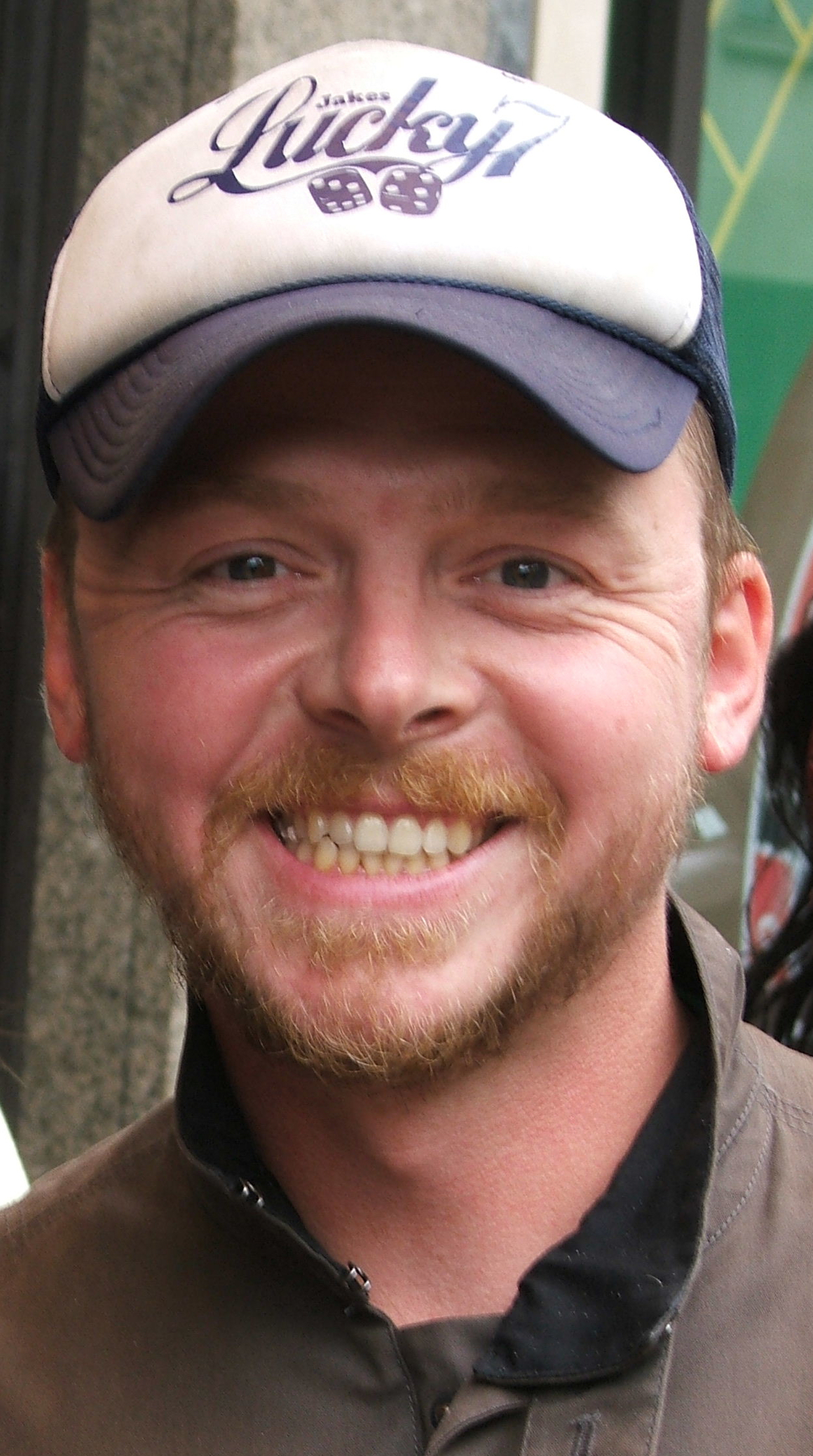
Actor Simon Pegg at FrightFest in 2005

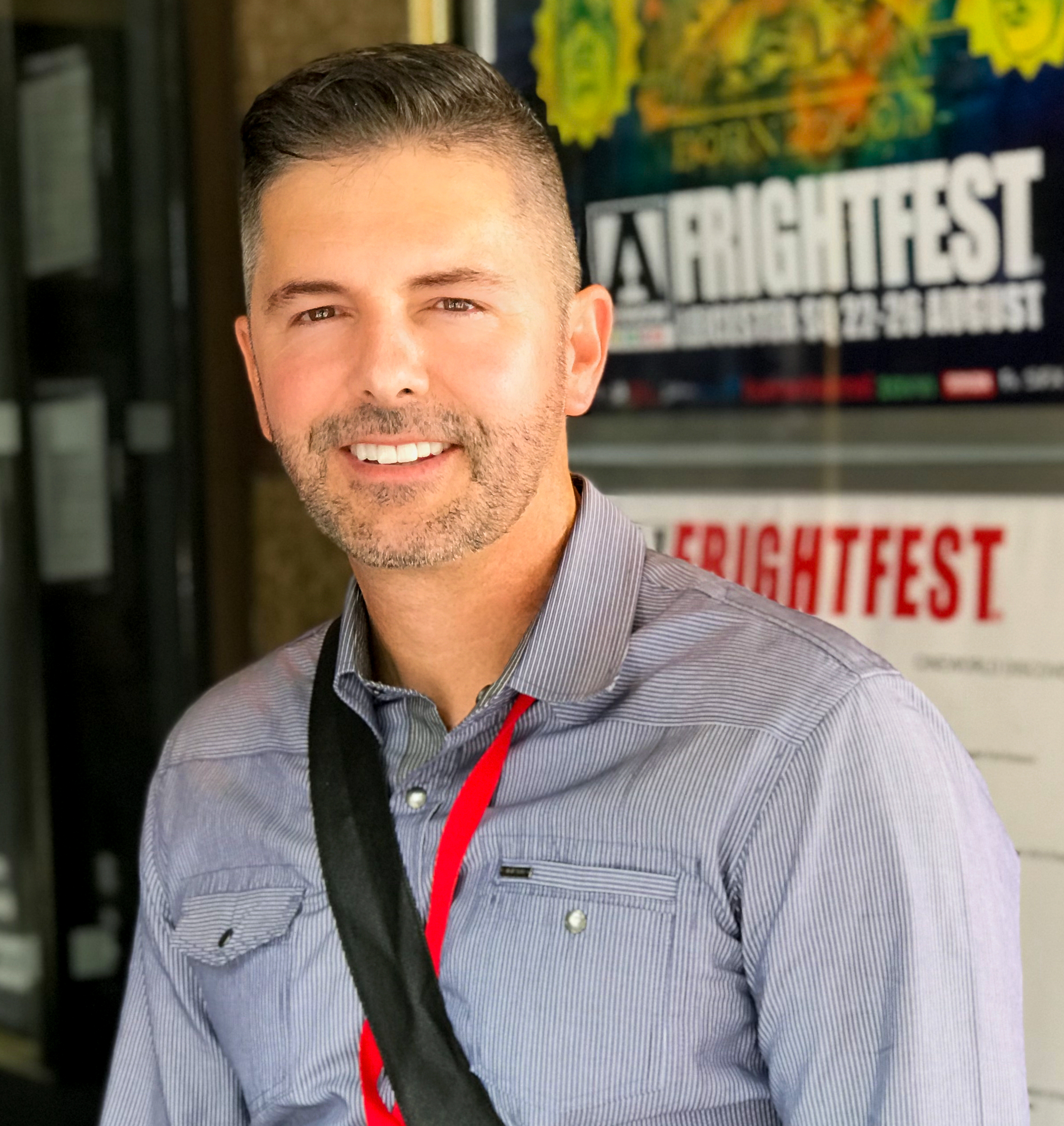
Richard Handley London Frightfest Leicester Square 2019

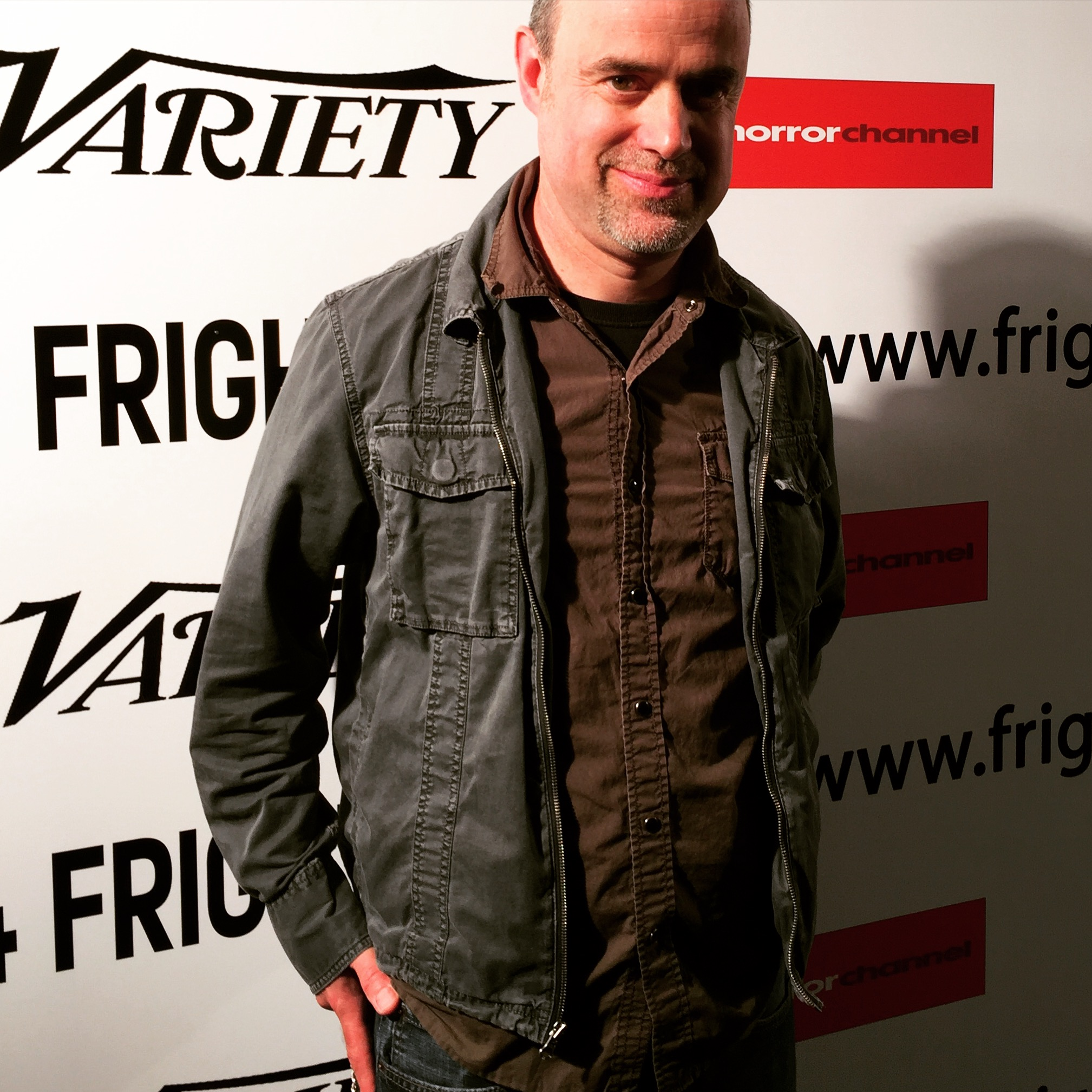
Padraig Reynolds at Frightfest

The following is a listing of each film and shorts (and previews) shown at the festival each year:

Year	Location	Films shown	Short films shown	Notes
2000	Princes Charles Cinema in Soho, London	Lighthouse, Ed Gein, Freeway II: Confessions of a Trickbaby, Dario Argento's The Phantom of the Opera, Christina's House, Scary Movie, Pitch Black, Blood, Guts, Bullets and Octane, Ring 2, Blood, The Criminal, Anatomie, Mario Bava: Maestro of the Macabre, Dario Agento an eye for horror, The 13th Sign, Audition, and Cut.	Purgatory and In Memory of Laura	
2001	Princes Charles Cinema	The Bunker, Revelation, Kiss of the Dragon, Cubbyhouse, Sleepless, Scary Movie 2, The Devil's Backbone, The Texas Chainsaw Massacre 2, Cradle of Fear, Dust, Brotherhood of the Wolf, Battle Royale, Alone, The Isle, Ginger Snaps, and Jeepers Creepers.	The Window and Universal	The Devil's Backbone received a positive reception, prompting director Guillermo Del Toro to dub the festival "the Woodstock of gore".
2002	Princes Charles Cinema	Nine Lives, Frailty, The Princess Blade, Donnie Darko, The Eye, Halloween: Resurrection, One Hour Photo, My Little Eye, Swimfan, Tuno Negro, Dark Water, Spider, The Happiness of the Katakuris, Bloody Mallory, Insomnia, and Ted Bundy.	Pissboy, The Circerones and Whacked	The front rows became available to weekend passholders for the first time. Director Danny Boyle screened the first reel of 28 Days Later and Paul W. S. Anderson and producer Jeremy Bolt appeared to show a promo for Resident Evil.
2003	Prince Charles Cinema	Octane, The League of Extraordinary Gentlemen, Beyond Re-Animator, Tattoo, Malefique, Cypher, Jeepers Creepers 2, Charlie's Family, Dracula: Pages from a Virgin's Diary, Phone, The Last Horror Movie, Gozu, Cabin Fever, House of the Dead, Between Your Legs, Fear X, and House of 1000 Corpses.	Virus, Suspended and The Last Dream	In attendance were directors Marcus Adams, Eric Valette, Julian Richards, and Rob Zombie.
2004	Princes Charles Cinema	Oldboy, Haute Tension, Toolbox Murders, Profondo Rosso, The Tesseract, Romasanta: The Werewolf Hunt, The I Inside, Hellboy, Monster Man, The Card Player, Buppah Rahtree, Code 46, Calvaire, Ginger Snaps Back: The Beginning, The Eye 2, One Point 0, The Hillside Strangler, Casshern, The Machinist, and Creep.	Rex Steele Nazi Smasher, Oltro Ladrillo En La Pared (Another Brick in the Wall), La Guarida Del Ermitano (In The Hermits Lair), L'Autre (The Other), and Amor So De Mae (Love from Mother Only)	Directors and producers who presented at the event included Park Chan-wook, Alexandre Aja and actress Cécile de France, Paco Plaza and Brian Yuzna, John Fawcett and Paula Devonshire, Hamish McAlpine, Brad Anderson, and Christopher Smith and actress Franka Potente. Smith and Potente held a Q&A session after the film. Guillermo del Toro was also present to screen his film Hellboy alongside actors Ron Perlman, Selma Blair, and Rupert Evans, who similarly held a Q&A session after the film.
2005	Odeon West End	Night of the Living Dead, Dawn of the Dead, Day of the Dead, Land of the Dead, A Bittersweet Life, Evil Aliens, Do You Like Hitchcock?, Dead Meat, Ban the Sadist Videos, The Neighbour No. 13, Wild Country, The Collingswood Story, Marebito, Red Eye, Night Watch, Dominion: Prequel to the Exorcist, The Roost, 2001 Maniacs, Born to Fight, Day of the Dead 2: Contagium, P, Antikörper, and Wolf Creek.	The Eel, The Ten Steps, The Victim and Mrs Davenport's Throat	Gregory Nicotero made an appearance and displayed zombie props used in the making of the movies, after which director George A. Romero presented Land of the Dead. Others that presented their films at the festival included Jake West, Conor McMahon, Carl Daft, Samantha Shields and Nicola Muldoon, Ti West, David McGillivray, Paul Spurrier, Christian Alvart, and Greg McLean with Cassandra Magrath and Kestie Morassi.
2006	Odeon West End	Severance, Pan's Labyrinth, The Hound of the Baskervilles, Countess Dracula, Twins of Evil, Hatchet, Frostbiten, Isolation, Earthlings Ugly Bags of Mostly Water, See No Evil, Open Water 2: Adrift, Snoop Dogg's Hood of Horror, Broken, The Living and the Dead, Ils, Grimm Love, The Lost, Sheitan, H6: Diary of a Serial Killer, Ghost of Mae Nak, Puritan, Behind the Mask: The Rise of Leslie Vernon, and The Host.	Gasoline Blood, In the Place of the Dead, Out of the Darkness, snatching time, Missed Call and Deadly Tantrum. The festival hosted the CUT! competition short film showcase, which was made up of Hammer Falls, Torn Flesh, The Silent Scream, Natural Birthing, A Very Grimm Fairytale, The Collector, Curta Veraso, The Fall Down, Dead Wood, and Kasting.	The festival brochure/programme expanded too with an original comic strip (Intermission by John-Paul Kamath of London Horror Comic) and an original short story by author/critic Kim Newman. Dave Andrew composed music for FrightFest, which played between movies and a FrightFest exclusive trailer for Hot Fuzz was presented by Edgar Wright. Guillermo del Toro and Alfonse Cuarón were also present at the festival for the UK premiere of Pan's Labyrinth, which occurred after an afternoon Hammer retrospective. Other presenters at the festival included Adam Green, Billy O'Brien, Jordan Baker, Adam Mason, Simon Rumley, Mark Duffied, Hadi Hajaig, David Soul, and Nick Moran.
2007	Leicester Square	Black Sheep, Black Water, Hatchet, The Sword Bearer, The Signal, 1408, Teeth, All the Boys Love Mandy Lane, Shrooms, Fritt Vilt, Joshua, Storm Warning, Wrong Turn 2, Disturbia, The Devil Dared Me To, Jack Ketchum's The Girl Next Door, The Zombie Diaries, Kilometer 31, Spiral, Botched, WΔZ, Postal, Seed, Skinwalkers, and Dnevnoy dozor. Other footage shown at the festival was the screening of extra features from the 28 Weeks Later, Doomsday preview footage, and a Don't fake trailer from Grindhouse.	The Bride was screened at the festival and on Saturday the Short Film Showcase was made up of the films We're Ready for you now, Dead @17, The Dear Hunter, Pig Tale, and Little Brats.	On the festival's final day FrightFest supported an attempt to break the Zombie Walk record to tie in with the showing of The Zombie Diaries. The walk was unsuccessful in breaking the record, falling short of the then current record held by a zombie walk held in Pittsburgh, Pennsylvania. Presenters at the event included Andrew Macdonald, Neil Marshall, Mikael Håfström, Paddy Breathnach, Roar Uthaug, Joe Lynch, Kit Ryan, Chris Stapp and Matt Heath, Jonathan King, Tom Shankland and Clive Bradley, Juan Antonio Bayona and Sergio G. Sánchez, Adam Green, Mike Williamson, and Rigoberto Castañeda. Uwe Boll hosted a double bill with a Q&A session while Adam Green and Alan Jones conducted a live commentary for Hatchet. Reece Shearsmith and other cast and crew previewed footage from their film The Cottage and Emily Booth introduced a grindhouse trailers documentary. FrightFest Xtra a one-day event held at The Phoenix Cinema, East Finchley on the following Saturday and presented Santo in the Wax Museum, Espectro, and Mr. Brooks.
2008	Odeon West End	Eden Lake, I Know How Many Runs You Scored Last Summer, Scar-3D, Time Crimes, King of the Hill, Trailer Park of Terror, Mum & Dad, The Strangers, Freakdog, Bad Biology, Fear(s) of the Dark, Dance of the Dead, Manhunt, The Chaser, The Midnight Meat Train, Tokyo Gore Police, Bubba's Chili Parlor, From Within, Let the Right One In, Autopsy, Martyrs, Jack Brooks Monster Slayer, The Dead Outside, The Disappeared, Mirrors, and Death Race.	Other FrightFest events included the Zone Horror Cut short movie competition and the Film4 FrightFest short film showcase. The short films in the showcase were The Chest, The Amazing Trousers, Homework, is anyone there, Psycho Hillbilly Massacre, and Total Fury. Other short films shown at the festival were The Listening Dead and Left Turn, and Norman J. Warren introduced a separate compendium of shorts.	The festival's opening film was Eden Lake, which was presented by James Watkins and actors Michael Fassbender and Jack O'Connell. Directors Adam Green and Joe Lynch were also present at the festival as "The Douche Brothers" and provided 5 short movies depicting their fictional journey to FrightFest 2008, each of which played before the day's early evening movie. The opening reel of Book of Blood was shown, as were trailers for Grace and the Friday the 13th remake. Preview footage was shown for Into the Dark: Exploring the Horror Film, Dead Set, and Lesbian Vampire Killers. The footage was presented by Paul McEvoy, Charlie Brooker, and MyAnna Buring, respectively.
2009	Empire, Leicester Square	Triangle, The Hills Run Red, Infestation, The Horseman, Beware The Moon, An American Werewolf in London - Remastered, Shadow, La Horde, Macabre, Smash Cut, Hierro, The Girl with the Dragon Tattoo, Giallo, Trick 'r Treat, Vampire Girl vs. Frankenstein Girl, Dead Snow, The Human Centipede (First Sequence), Coffin Rock, Night of the Demons, Clive Barker's Dread, Zombie Women of Satan, The House of the Devil, Case 39, Heartless, and The Descent Part 2.	Deadwalkers, Paris By Night of the Living Dead and Sad Case	This tenth incarnation of the festival marked the first time the festival took place on two screens, a "Main Screen" for the major films of the festival and the "Discovery Screen" for some smaller entries which are repeated during the festival. John Landis was in attendance over the weekend and also introduced the screening of An American Werewolf in London. Joe Lynch and Adam Green returned as "The Douche Brothers" and screened the short "The Road to Frightfest" films they had created for last year's festival. Films shown on the discovery screen were Best Worst Movie, I Sell the Dead, I Think We're Alone Now, Colin, Black, Evil Things, Fragment, It's Alive, and Pontypool. The discovery screen also hosted 'The Horror of Writing' Competition.
2010	Empire, Leicester Square	Hatchet II, Primal, Dead Cert, Eggshells, The Texas Chainsaw Massacre, Isle of Dogs, F, Red Hill, Alien vs Ninja, Cherry Tree Lane, The Tortured, 13Hrs, I Spit on Your Grave, Monsters, Dream Home, The Pack, We Are What We Are, Damned by Dawn, Buried, The Loved Ones, Video Nasties: Moral Panic, Censorship & Videotape, The Dead, Bedevilled, Red White & Blue, and The Last Exorcism.	The Film 4 FrightFest international short film showcase was also held on the main screen, as was a quiz run by Andy Nyman.	This year introduced the Total Icons stand of films, sponsored by Total Film. Two films were pulled from the festival, the controversial A Serbian Film and Gregg Araki's Kaboom, the latter of which was pulled by the director himself. Screening A Serbian Film would have required that the organizers screen a heavily censored version approved by the British Board of Film Classification and Westminster council, which they were unwilling to do as "a film of this nature should be shown in its entirety". Director Tobe Hooper was in attendance and hosted a Q&A on the main screen as part of Total Icons. Films shown on the discovery screen were Burning Bright, The Clinic, Finalé, Wound, Outcast, Higanjima: Escape from Vampire Island, Christopher Roth, Fanboys, After.Life, Amer, and After.Life.
2011	Empire, Leicester Square	Don't Be Afraid of the Dark, Final Destination 5, The Theatre Bizarre, Rogue River, The Holding, Urban Explorers, The Glass Man, Tucker & Dale vs. Evil, Vile, The Troll Hunter, The Wicker Tree, Panic Button, Fright Night, The Woman, Chillerama, The Divide, The Innkeepers, Sint, Kill List, Detention, A Night In The Woods, Deadheads, Sennentuntschi: Curse Of the Alps, Inbred, and A Lonely Place to Die.	The Short Film Showcase and Andy Nyman's Quiz From Hell were also featured on the main screen.	Total Icon interview this year was with film producer Larry Fessenden. The festival also featured a showing of The Dead with live audio commentary by directors Howard J. Ford and John Ford, as well as five new short films paying tribute to the films of John Carpenter, each from a different director. The directors and their films were Jake West/Escape from New York, Sean Hogan/The Thing, James Moran/Halloween, Marc Price/They Live, and Ben Wheatley/Assault on Precinct 13. Films shown on the discovery screen were The Man Who Saw Frankenstein Cry, A Horrible Way To Die, Midnight Son, Rabies, Blood Runs Cold, Kidnapped, Stormhouse, The Dead, Atrocious, My Sucky Teen Romance, The Caller, and The Devil's Business.
2012	Empire, Leicester Square	The Seasoning House, Cockneys Vs Zombies, Grabbers, Nightbreed The Cabal Cut, Hidden in the Woods (original version), V/H/S, REC 3: Genesis, Stitches, Eurocrime! The Italian Cop and Gangster Films That Ruled the '70s, Outpost: Black Sun, Paura 3D, Under The Bed, Tulpa, Maniac, The Thompsons, Sleep Tight, Berberian Sound Studio, Sinister, Dead Sushi, American Mary, After, Chained, The Possession, and Tower Block. Films shown on the discovery screen were Guinea Pigs, The Victim, Elevator, A Night Of Nightmares, Sawney: Flesh Of Man, Errors of the Human Body, May I Kill U?, Kill Zombie, Nightmare Factory, Before Dawn, Remnants, Wrong Turn 4: Bloody Beginnings, We Are the Night, The Inside, Community, and Guinea Pigs. The films shown on the new re-discovery screen were Inbred (with live audio commentary), The Arrival of Wang, Crawl, The Mummy's Shroud, Rasputin, the Mad Monk, The Devil Rides Out, and Bride of Frankenstein. This screen also hosted additional showings of We Are the Night, Sawney: Flesh of Man, Guinea Pigs, May I Kill U?, and The Inside, which had screened on the discovery screen.	Short Film Showcase shown on the main screen	This festival marked the first time that FrightFest's offerings would be shown on three screens, as the organisers offered a third "re-discovery screen", where attendees could watch remastered classic films. Another new addition was the introduction of the Variety Award, which would be presented by actor Simon Pegg to Gregory Nicotero for his work in the special effects field. This year's Total Film Total Icon interview was with Dario Argento, which was hosted on the main screen
2013	Empire, Leicester Square	The Dead 2: India, Curse of Chucky, You're Next, The Dyatlov Pass Incident, Dementamania, Hatchet III, Haunter, V/H/S/2, 100 Bloody Acres, The Hypnotist, Frankenstein's Army, Hammer of the Gods, No One Lives, R.I.P.D., Cheap Thrills, Missionary, In Fear, The Grief Tourist, The Conspiracy, The Last Days, I Spit On Your Grave 2, Dark Touch, Banshee Chapter, Odd Thomas, We Are What We Are, and Big Bad Wolves. For Elisa, Daylight, Sadik 2, Outpost: Rise of the Spetsnaz, Paranormal Diaries: Clophill, Wake in Fright, The American Scream, Hansel & Gretel: The 420 Witch, Antisocial, Painless, Wither, Snap, The Demon's Rook, Stalled, Cannon Fodder, Rewind This!, The Borderlands, On Tender Hooks, Bring Me the Head of the Machine Gun Woman, Contracted, The Desert, Willow Creek, House Of Usher, Nosferatu, Corruption, and an episode of Holliston.	666 Short Film Awards shown on the main screen	This year marked the addition of another screen, the "Extra Screen", which hosted additional screenings of any sell out titles. The prior year's Re-Discovery screen was not brought back in favor of a second Discovery screen. This year's Variety Spotlight interview was with director Ben Wheatley.
2014	Vue Cinemas in Leicester Square	The Guest, Sin City: A Dame to Kill For, Zombeavers, Shockwave Darkside, The Green Inferno, Late Phases, Dead Snow: Red vs. Dead, The Last Showing, Housebound, All Cheerleaders Die, Starry Eyes, The Harvest, I Survived A Zombie Holocaust, The Babadook, Life After Beth, Among the Living, Faults, Open Windows, Home, The Samurai, Stage Fright, Xmoor, Nymph, Alleluia, V/H/S: Viral, and The Signal. Honeymoon, Preservation, Julia, The Forgotten, The Canal, WolfCop, Wolf Creek 2, Wrong Turn 6, R100, Exists, The Den, The Drownsman, Dead Within, White Settlers, Digging Up The Marrow, Creep, Bad Milo!, The Sleeping Room, The Mirror, Coherence, Expedition, Drew: The Man Behind The Poster, Doc of the Dead, Lost Soul - The Doomed Journey Of Richard Stanley's Island of Dr. Moreau, The House at the End of Time, The Visitor, A Nightmare on Elm Street, Nekromantik, The Shining, Another, Altergeist, Lemon Tree Passage, Truth Or Dare, The Remaining, Deadly Virtues: Love.Honour.Obey., Blood Moon, and Extraterrestrial.	Short Film Showcases were shown on the Discovery Screen	
2015	Vue Cinemas in Leicester Square	Cherry Tree, Turbo Kid, Stung, Hellions, Landmine Goes Click, The Diabolical, JeruZalem, We Are Still Here, Demonic, Shut In, Bait, Frankenstein, Some Kind Of Hate, Rabid Dogs, Deathgasm, Slumlord, Road Games, Inner Demon, Scherzo Diabolico, A Christmas Horror Story, Curve, Night Fare, Nina Forever, Emelie, and Tales of Halloween. Pod, Wind Walkers, Worry Dolls, Aaaaaaaah!, Never Let Go, Bloodsucking Bastards, The Rotten Link, The Entity, III, Final Girl, The Sand, Afterdeath, The Unfolding, Body, The Shelter, Zombie Fight Club, Future Shock! The Story Of 2000AD, The Nightmare, Estranged, The Hallow, Sun Choke, Night Of The Living Deb, Hangman, Another Me, The Tenderness Of Wolves, Madman, The Mutilator, Contracted: Phase II, Duke Mitchell - Remake, Remix, Rip-Off, Over Your Dead Body, These Final Hours, Most Likely To Die, Summer Camp, They Look Like People, Captain Kronos – Vampire Hunter, Hawk the Slayer, Your Vice Is a Locked Room and Only I Have the Key, Hellraiser, The Reflecting Skin, The Lesson, Howl, Awaiting, Goddess Of Love, The Lazarus Effect, Suspension, Last Girl Standing, Banjo, Hostile, Bite, and Curtains.	Short Film Showcases shown on The Discovery Screen	
2016	Vue Cinemas, Shepherd's Bush, London	My Father Die, Cell, Let Her Out, House on Willow Street, The Chamberm Mercy, They Call Me Jeeg, Robot, Pet, White Coffin, Through the Shadow, Enclosure, Ibiza Undead, Night of Something Strange, The Devil's Candy, Francesca, Another Evil, Population Zero, Benavidez's Case, The Similars, Road Games, Hostage to the Devil, Lost Solace, The Unraveling, The Girl With all the Gifts, Main Screen: The Rezort, Abattoir, The Master Cleanse, Sadako vs. Kayako, Beyond the Gates, Blood Feast, Attack of the Lederhosen Zombies, Offensive, The Love Witch, Knucklebones, Cruel Summer, House of Salem, The Creature Below, The Unkindness of Ravens, Hallow's Eve, The Corpse series, Fortitude (season 2, episode 1), Fury of the Demon, Beyond the Walls, Karaoke Zombies, Downhill, Johnny Frank Garret's Last Word, Broken, Realive, 31, Let's Be Evil, Egomaniac, Crow, Bab Blood: The Movie, Facing His Fears: David McGillivray, Blood Feast, SiREN, The Neighbour, The Windmill Massacre, Monolith, Director's Cut, Red Christmas, Train to Busan, We Are the Flesh, Blood Hunters, The Killing of America, Paranormal Drive, Here Alone, The Evil in Us, Under the Shadow, Man Underground, Shelley, Found Footage 3D	Short Story Showcases	In addition to the change of venue it was announced that for 2016 FrightFest would include the entire 12 screen cinema as a venue for the first time. As with previous years, the festival maintained the three main screen format, each screen known by the name of an individual sponsor (Horror Channel Screen, Arrow Video Screen and Splice Media Screen) and again each film was rotated between the three screens at different times to allow invited guests and introductions to be given on each screen. There were, once again, three Discovery screens. Beware the Moon book launch, horror writing master class with James Moran, Women in Genre panel, Special FX demonstration, The Future of British Horror,
2017	Cineworld Leicester Square and The Princes Charles Cinema	Cult of Chucky, Death Note, Psychopaths, Redwood, Diane, Freehold, Sequence Break, Radius, 68 Kill, Leatherface, Dead Shack, The Glass Coffin, Bad Match, Mindhack, Our Evil, Freddy/Eddy, Veronica, Voice from the Stone, Dhogs, King Cohen: The Wild World of Filmmaker Larry Cohen, Fanged Up, It Stains the Sands Red, Fashionista, Exhume, Nightworld, Accountable, The Bar, Alone, Jackals, Attack Of The Adult Babies, Victor Crowley, Game of Death, 3rd Night, Mansfield 66/67, Diane, Ruin Me, The Glass Coffin, Death Laid an Egg, Mountain Fever, Boots on the Ground, To Hell and Back: The Kane Hodder Story, Where The Skin Lies, Eat Locals, Canaries, Return of the Living Dead III, Inside, The Movie Crypt Podcast, Redwood, Cold Hell, The Duke Mitchell Film Party!, Killing Ground, The End?, Double Date, Mayhem, The Villainess, Bad Match, Mindhack, Our Evil, Ruin Me, Freddy/Eddy, Devil's Gate, Incontrol, Replace, Imitation Girl, Demons Of The Mind, Blood From The Mummy's Tomb, Dream Demon, Still/Born, Lowlife, Better Watch Out. The Terror of Hallow's Eve, Tragedy Girls, Veronica, 3rd Night, Mansfield 66/67, Crow's Blood, Top Knot Detective, Meatball Machine Kodoku		In Conversation with Kane Hodder Screen International Genre Rising Star Award
2018	Cineworld Leicester Square and The Prince Charles Cinema	The Ranger, Summer of '84, Mega Time Squad, Bad Samaritan, Halloween (1978), The Cleaning Lady, Braid, Puppet Master: The Littlest Reich, The Most Assassinated Woman in the World, Incident in a Ghost Land, Boar, Out House, A Bluebird in my Heart, Pimped, Dead Night, Crystal Eyes, A Young Man with High Potential, St Agatha, One Cut of the Dead, Blue Sunshine, Seeds, Final Stop, Piercing, Rock Steady Row, Lifechanger, Ravers, Heretiks, Chuck Steel: Night of the Trampires, What Keeps you Alive, Upgrade, Killing God, The Arrow Video Podcast, The LaPlace's Demon, Seeds, Mannequins + Book of Monsters, CRTL, The Devil's Doorway, F.U.B.A.R., Perfect Skin, The Duke Mitchell Film Club!, The Tokoloshe, One Cut of the Dead, Halloween, Bad Samaritan, Life After Flash, Lasso, Hell is Where the Home Is, The Man who Killed Hitler and then the Bigfoot, He's Out There, Terried (Aterrados), Anna and the Apocalypse, The Nights Eats the Night, Luciderina, Hammer Horror: The Warner Bros. Year, VideoMan, The Night Sitter, White Chamber, Bodied, Await Further Instructions, Tigers are not Afraid, Life Changer, Ghost Stories with Live commentary, Ghost Mask Scar, Piercing, Cult of Terror, Open 24 hours, The Field Guide to Evil, The Dark, The Golem, Climax, Secret Santa, The Witch in the Window, Frankenstein's Creature, Wolfman got Nards, Short Film Showcase 3, Possum, Black Site, Rock Steady Row, Crystal Eyes, The Tokoloshe	Short Story Showcases	Screen International Genre Rising Star Award presentation.
2019	Cineworld and Prince Charles Cinemas in Leicester Square	Come to Daddy, Crawl, Scary Stories to Tell in the Dark, Rock, Paper and Scissors, I Am Toxic, Dark Encounter, Cut Off, Knives and Skin, Kindred Spirits, Bliss, Bullets of Justice, Dachra, Impossible Crimes, Blood & Flesh: The Reel Life & Ghastly Death Of Al Adamson, Sadistic Intentions, The Deeper You Dig, Fingers, The Wind, Girl on the Third Floor, To Your Last Death, Harpoon, Porno, Haunt, Red Letter Day, Tenebrae, The Dark Pictures' Man Of Medan, Freaks, Mutant Blast, Mary, Ghost Killers Vs. Bloody Mary, Feedback, The Drone, Madness In The Method, Why Don’t You Just Die!, I'll Take Your Dead, True Fiction, Extracurricular, Halloween Party, Volition, Death of A Vlogger, A Serial Killer's Guide to Life, Criminal Audition, Dark Sense, Are We Dead Yet, Duke Mitchell Film Party, The Dark Red, Critters Attack!, Happy Face, I Trapped the Devil, Spiral, Eat Brains Love, Daniel Isn't Real, Ready Or Not, Nekrotronic, The Furies, Stalked, The Magnificent Obsession Of Michael Reeves, Master Of Dark Shadows, The Sonata, Depraved, Witches In The Woods, Dark Light, Darlin', Bloodline, Fresh Blood Initiative, From Page To Scream, Rabid (1977), The Legend of The Stardust Brothers, The Black String, Satanic Panic, Tales From The Lodge, Rabid, A Good Woman Is Hard To Find, Deadcon, Driven, The Barge People, For We Are Many, The Wretched, The Banana Splits Movie, Stairs, The Perished, Here Comes Hell		The Perished had its worldwide premiere here.
2020	Online (due to COVID-19 pandemic)	Sky Sharks, There's No Such Thing as Vampires, 12 Hour Shift, I Am Lisa, Triggered, The Columnist, The Horror Crowd, Blind, Don't Click, The Honeymoon Phase, Playhouse, They're Outside, Dark Place, Skull: The Mask, Hail to the Deadites, Hall, A Ghost Waits, Clapboard Jungle: Surviving the Independent Film Business, Two Heads Creek, Aquaslash, AV The Hunt, Dark Stories, Enhanced, Blinders, and The Swerve.		
2021	Cineworld Leicester Square	Demonic, The Kindred, Crabs!, Brain Freeze, The Show, The Exorcism of Carmen Farias, Coming Home in the Dark, The Changed, Broadcast Signal Intrusion, Dawn Breaks Behind the Eyes, The Last Thing Mary Saw, Sweetie You Won’t Believe it, Offseason, Prisoners of Ghostland, The Maid, King Knight, Sound of Violence, Gaia, Evie, No Man of God, The Retaliators, Slapface, Ultrasound, The Advent Calendar, and The Sadness. Films shown on the discovery screens were Motherly, The Brilliant Terror, Shadow of the Cat, Night Drive, Hotel Poseidon, Red Snow, Pretty Boy, Isolation, Beyond the Infinite Two Minutes, Followers, Laguna Ave, The Parker Sessions, Bad Candy, The Unburied, Captive, Boy#5, Are We Monsters, The Last Rite, When the Screaming Starts, Bring Out the Fear, Censor, John and the Hole, Bloodthirsty, Forgiveness, Killer Concept, Woodlands: Dark and Days Bewitched, Post Mortem, Nocturna: Side A – The great Old Man’s Night, As In Heaven, So On Earth, Knocking, Greywood’s Plot, Mystery Spot, Antidote, She Watches From the Woods, and The Found Footage Phenomenon.		
2022	Cineworld Leicester Square	The Lair, The Visitor from the Future, Scare Package II: Rad Chad’s Revenge, Next Exit, The Harbinger, A Wounded Fawn, Night Sky, Final Cut, Midnight Peepshow, Something in the Dirt, She Came from the Woods, Lola, Dark Glasses, Candy Land, Deadstream, Mastemah, Incredible but True, H4Z4RD, Wolf Manor, The Price We Pay, Piggy, Terrifier 2, Burial, Barbarian, and Fall. The films shown on the discovery screens were B*tch a**, Croc!, Splinter, The Eyes Below, Pussycake, The Summoned, Tiny Cinema, The Ones You Didn’t Burn, They Wait in the Dark, Hypochondriac, Raven’s Hollow, Everyone Will Burn, Mean Spirited, Cult of VHS, Holy S**t!, Swallowed, The Ghosts of Monday, Sissy, Sorry About the Demon, Everybody Dies by the End, The Breach, Hounded, Orchestrator of Storms, Wreck, Eating Miss Campbell, Cerebrum, The Group, The Devil’s Hour, Walking Against the Rain, Bite, The Duke Mitchell Film Party, Dog Soldiers, Control, Torn Hearts, Follow Her, Huesera, Powertool Cheerleaders Vs. The Boyband of the Screeching Dead, Deep Fear, Daughter, Night of the Bastard, Who Invited Them, The Leech, Keeping the British End Up!, The Last Client, Super Z, The Creeping, Do Not Disturb, Wolfkin, Family Dinner, The Ghost Writer, Stalker, Living With Chucky, New Religion, The Once and Future Smash, and End Zone 2.		
2023	Cineworld Leicester Square	Suitable Flesh, The Dive, It Lives Inside, Creeping Death, Where the Devil Roams, New Life, Faceless After Dark, Thats a Wrap, Monolith, Cobweb, Pandemonium, Herd, Farang, Transmission, Piper, The Seedling, Cold Meat, Raging Grace, Mancunian Man: The Legendary Life of Cliff Twemlow, My Mother's Eyes, Founders Day, Home Sweet Home, The Exorcist and The Sacrifice Game. The films scheduled to be shown on discovery screen one were Punch, Lore, A Million Years, Trim Season, How to Kill Monsters, Doctor Jekyll, Here for Blood, The Conjuring, The Moor, Isaac, The Glenarma Tapes, Haunted Ulster Live, REC, Enter the Clones of Bruce Lee, The Blue Rose, Sympathy For the Devil, Failure!, The Puppet Asylum and It Follows. The films scheduled to be shown on discovery screen two were The J Horror Virus, Black Mold, What You Wish For, Poundcake, Werewolf Santa, River, Spookt, To Fire You Come at Last, Thorns, Triggered, Kims Video, The Black Mass, Alligator, T Blockers, I Am Monsters, Good Boy and Departing Seniors. The films scheduled to be shown on discovery screen three were Eight Eyes, The Weird Kidz, The Knocking, The Ghost Station, Cobweb, Hostile Dimensions, Minore, 1982: The Greatest Geek Year Ever and The Darkside of Society		
2024	The Odeon Luxe, Leicester Square	Broken Bird, Test Screening, The Invisible Raptor, An Taibhse, Bookworm, Ghost Game, Shelby Oaks, The Hitcher, Hauntology, Survive, The Last Voyage of the Demeter, Dead Mail, Traumatika, Strange Darling, Members Club, The Last Ashes, The Life and Deaths of Christopher Lee, Azrael: Angel of Death, Saint Clare, Invader, The Dead Thing, A Desert, Ladybug, Cold Wallet and The Substance. The films scheduled for Discovery Screen 1 were Cinderella's Curse, Carnage for Christmas, The Daemon, The Lonely Man with the Ghost Machine, Scarlet Blue, The Bunker, Children of the Wicker Man, Mutilator 2, Touchdown, Scopophobia, Year 10, Protein, 7 Keys, Duke Mitchell Film Party, The A-Frame, A Nightmare on Elm Street, Never Have I Ever, Bogieville, Charlotte, Agatha and Scared Shitless. The films scheduled for Discovery Screen 2 were I Will Never Leave You Alone, Happy Halloween, Drive Back, So Unreal, The Freaks of Fancy, Cursed in Baja, Delirium, From Figment to Finance, In the Name of God, Boutique: To Preserve and Collect, Video Vision, The Monster Beneath Us, Dark Match, AI: For You, Cara, Derelict, Razor Blade Smile, Schlitter: Evil in the Woods, Fright, Generation Terror and Members Club. The films scheduled for Discovery Screen 3 were Things Will Be Different, The Last Podcast, From Darkness, Mermaid Legend, A Samurai in Time and The Last Voyage of the Demeter.		
2025	The Odeon Luxe, Leicester Square	The Home, Cognaitive, Night of Violence, Appofeniacs, What She Doesn't Know, Transcending Dimensions, A Serbian Documentary, The Toxic Avenger, Flush, The Red Mask, Marshmallow, Self-Help, Crushed, Jimmy and Stiggs, Hold the Fort, 213 Bones, Tomb Watcher, The Descent, Bone Lake, Redux Redux, Odyssey, Mother of Flies, Bamboo Revenge, The Rows, and Influencers. The films scheduled for Discovery Screen 1 were Bambi: The Reckoning, The Arbiter, Parasomnia, Human, Don't Let the Cat Out, Foreigner, In a Cold Vein, Portal to Hell, Pig Hill, The Caretaker, The Haunting at Jack the Ripper's House, He Kills at Night, Healing Andy, Sane Inside Insanity: The Phenomenon of Rocky Horror, Super Happy Fun Clown, Death Cycle, The Weed Eaters, Sick Puppy, and The Serpent's Skin. The films scheduled for Discovery Screen 2 were The Only Ones, Bambi: The Reckoning, Dog of God, The Degenerate, Your Host, The Confession, Daughters of Darkness, Five, Blood Shine, Blockhead, The Arborist, The Mannequin, Hellcat, Malpertuis, Where is Juan Moctezuma?, The Other People, A Blind Bargain, Above the Knee, and Gill. The films scheduled for Discovery Screen 3 were Dooba Dooba, Kombucha, Salt Along the Tongue, Noseeums, El Instincto, The Haunted Forest, and Cover.		
2026	The Odeon Luxe, Leicester Square	Nervous, Colony, Big Baby, Imposters, Frostbite, Ponderosa, The Pitchfork Retreat, Drag, Hungry, Labyrinth, Dead Reset, Ithaqua, Grind, The Nameless Ballad, Ghost in the Cell, The Last Temptation of Becky, The Glorious Dead, Alien, Gator Face, Spider Island, Oddities, Valley View Motel, You Are the Film, Hyena, and Species. The films scheduled for Discovery Screen 1 are Grin, Bowels of Hell, Terrestrial, Electric Meat, Starsuckers, Faces of Death, Wrath of the Gods, The Latcher, The Death of Us, The Brook, The Alice Paradox, Binding Eva, Heraldry Paranormal, Zip Wire, Infirmary, Dracula: The Night Around Us, Compliance, Full Moon Rising, and Snapshot. The films scheduled for Discovery Screen 2 are Slay, Blood Secret, Dead Eyes, Trauma, or Monsters All, Another, Our Effed Up World, Invoking Scream, The Barn Part III, Turn it Up, Recluse, Lesions, Hoarder, Home Bodies, Meat Kills, Do You Want to Play, Welcome to G-Town, Bad Karaoke, Bunny Rabit, Bloom, The Peril at Pincer Point, and Mother and Me. The films scheduled for Discovery Screen 3 are Salmokji: Whispering Water, Night After Night, Remanence, Train to Busan, The Abominable Snowman, The Fright Stuff, Synthesized, Sweet Violence, and Seoul Station. The films scheduled for Discovery Screen 4 are Rubberhead: The Life & Times of Steve Johnson, Crazy Lips, Buddy, Fresh Meat, Gore From Outer Space, The Flesh Itself, Ghostkeeper, Frogman, and Frogman Returns.		

=== Halloween October FrightFest ===
2006 marked the first FrightFest Halloween All-Nighter, which would be traditionally held on 30 October of each year. An all-night Halloween film festival was shown on 30 October 2008. Films shown at the event were Gnaw, Hush, Book Of Blood, Treevenge, My Name Is Bruce, The Children, Langliena: Una Storia Macabra, Escape from New York, Splinter, and Pig Hunt. In 2009 the all-night Halloween film festival was shown at the Empire Cinema on 30 October 2009. Films shown at the event were Umbrage, George A Romero's Survival Of The Dead, Paranormal Activity, Wrong Turn 3: Left For Dead, Jennifer's Body, and Carriers. The 2010 all-night event was shown at the Empire Cinema. Films shown at the event were Confessions, Altitude, The Silent House, Choose, and Rare Exports: A Christmas Tale.

In 2011, an all-night Halloween film festival, was held on 29 October. A second showing of the films, excluding Julien Maury and Alexandre Bustillo’s Livid, was held on 4 November 2011. The films shown were The Human Centipede II (Full Sequence), Bad Meat, Faces in the Crowd, Livid, Cold Sweat, and The Watermen. The 2012 Halloween All-Nighter was held on 27 October at Leicester Square. The films shown were Bait 3D, Gallowalkers, Zombie Flesh Eaters, Excision, The Tall Man, and The Helpers. In 2013, the Frightfest Halloween All-Nighter was held on Saturday 26 October at the Vue Cinemas in Leicester Square. The films shown were Soulmate, Patrick, Discopath, Mark of the Devil, The Station, and Nothing Left to Fear.

The 2014 edition was held on 25 October, the lineup including Extraterrestrial, The Editor, The Pact II, The ABCs of Death 2, and Last Shift. In 2015, the event was renamed the "Halloween All-Dayer" and took place on 24 October, the lineup including Lazer Team, Momentum, The Vatican Tapes, The Unspoken, I Spit on Your Grave 3: Vengeance is Mine, and Belly of the Bulldog. The 2016 edition took place on 22 October and featured Bed of the Dead, Don't Hang Up, Rupture, Headshot, Cold Moon, and Fear, Inc.. In 2017, the All-Dayer took place on 28 October and included Horror Movie: A Low Budget Nightmare, Hostile, It Came From the Desert, Beyond Skyline, The Black Gloves, Housewife, and Terrifier.

In 2018 and 2019, the festival was once again renamed to "Arrow Video FrightFest Halloween All-Dayer". The 2018 festival, taking place on 3 November, included Reborn, Parallel, Mara, Peripheral, The Unthinkable, and Abrakadabra. In 2019 the festival ran on 2 November and featured Uncanny Annie, Scare Package, Candy Corn, We Summon the Darkness, Trick, and Swallow. The 2020 edition was online, running from 21 to 25 October, including Held, The Sinners, Sacrifice, Stranger, The Brain That Wouldn't Die, Dangerous to Know, The Banishing, Dead, Don't Look Back, The Returned, Woman of the Photographs, The Pale Door, Breeder, Tailgate, The Owners, Babysitter Must Die, Concrete Plans, The Reckoning, Butchers, Spare Parts, The World We Knew, Heckle, For the Sake of Vicious, Alien on Stage, Cyst, Blood Harvest, Benny Loves You, Dune Drifter, Broil, Redwood Massacre: Annihilation, Embryo, Relic, Hosts, Let's Scare Julie, Scavengers, The Stylists, The Funeral Home, Slaxx, Origin Unknown, Honeydew, Caveat, Lucky, The Nights Before Christmas, and Skylin3s. Arrow Video FrightFest Halloween returned on 29–30 October 2021, the lineup including The Seed, Barbarians, The Possessed, Pennywise: The Story of It, Last Survivors, The Innocents, Amulet, Veneciafrenia, and Miracle Valley.

The 2022 edition was renamed back to FrightFest Halloween and took place on 29 October, with an early extra screening of A Night of a Thousand Vampires on 27 October - the lineup included Tripping the Dark Fantastic, Freeze, Mad Heidi, Outpost, On the Edge, and The Offering. In 2023, the event was renamed to "Pigeon Shrine FrightFest Halloween" and took place from 27 to 28 October, featuring The Waterhouse, He Never Left, Maria, Eldritch USA, Lovely Dark and Deep, Superposition, Hood Witch, The Last Video Store, and Blue Light. In 2024, Pigeon Shrine FrightFest Halloween was on 1–2 November and included Magpie, Parvulos, Advent, The Bitter Taste, Alien Country, The Draft!, Time Travel is Dangerous, Catch a Killer, and Animale. The most recent edition was renamed back to "FrightFest Halloween" in 2025, taking place on 31 October to 1 November and including Primate, Deathgasm II: Goremageddon, Every Heavy Thing, Dolly, Affection, Posthouse, The Turkish Coffee Table, Coyotes, and Mag Mag.

== Glasgow Festival Line-ups ==
Starting in 2006, FrightFest has held a yearly film festival in Glasgow as part of the Glasgow Film Festival. Films shown are listed below:

Year	Films shown	Notes
2006	The Red Shoes (replaced The Great Yokai War), Bunshinsaba, Reeker, Wild Country with cast and crew, Boy Eats Girl	
2007	The Tripper, S & Man, The Messengers, Turistas, Motel Hell.	
2008	Grindhouse, Eden Log with Dir., REC with writer and Dir., The Cottage with cast, trailer for Beyond the Rave, faux grindhouse style trailers for Slash/Hive and Trannibal, Zombie Strippers	
2009	Dead Girl, Outlander, Walled In, Dorothy, I Sell the Dead, Grace, The Unborn, One Eyed Monster	The 2009 event took place over two days rather than the previous single day
2010	Frozen, Black Death Preview, 2001 Maniacs: Field of Screams, Stag Night, A Lizard in a Woman's Skin, Amer, [REC] 2, never-before-seen footage of Doghouse, Centurion Preview, Splice, Harpoon: Reykjavik Whale Watching Massacre	
2011	Little Deaths, I Saw the Devil, Machete Maidens Unleashed, Rubber, Territories, The Shrine, Mother's Day, Hobo With A Shotgun	
2012	Corman's World: Exploits of a Hollywood Rebel, Tape 407: The Mesa Reserve Incident, Crawl, The Day, War Of The Dead, Evidence, Penumbra, Rites of Spring, Wang's Arrival, Cassadaga (replaced The Devil Inside), The Raid	Also for the first time at the Glasgow Film Festival there was a FrightFest Extra strand running through the main festival, films screened were: Livid, The Reptile, The Plague of the Zombies, Dracula: Prince of Darkness
2013	The American Scream, Sawney: Flesh Of Man, The Lords of Salem, Byzantium, Detention of the Dead, Black Sabbath, Bring Me the Head of the Machine Gun Woman, The Bay, The ABCs of Death, Aftershock	Special guests for the weekend included: Eli Roth, Nicolás López, Lorenza Izzo, Neil Jordan, Gemma Arterton, Saoirse Ronan, Lee Hardcastle, Simon Rumley, Jake West and Lucy Clements. Also during the 2 days all 7 episodes of the Norwegian TV series Hellfjord were screened, with episodes playing before selected films with cast & crew in attendance over the weekend.
2014	Savaged, Proxy, Wolf Creek 2, The Sacrament, Afflicted, Video Nasties: Draconian Days, The Scribbler, Torment, Mindscape, Almost Human, Killers Repeat screenings at Cineworld Glasgow - Video Nasties: Draconian Days, Almost Human, The Sacrament, Wolf Creek 2, Killers	Director Ti West in conversation with Alan Jones Special guests for the weekend included: Ti West, Jorge Dorado, Joe Begos, Josh Ethier, Zack Parker, Jordan Barker, Jake West, Marc Morris, John Suits.
2015	Eliza Graves, The Atticus Institute, The Paper Round, The Hoarder, Wyrmwood, 88, Backmask, Clown, Sei donne per l'assassino, The Woods Movie, De Behandeling, [REC] 4: Apocalipsis, There Are Monsters	
2016	The Forest, The Hexecutioners, Anguish (2015 film), Pandemic, The Mind's Eye (film), Patchwork, The Wave, Southbound (2015 film), SPL2: A Time for Consequences, The Other Side of the Door (2016 film), Baskin (film), Martyrs (2015 film), The Devil's Candy	
2017	A Cure for Wellness, Phantasm: Remastered, The Warrior's Gate, It Stains the Sand Red, The Transfiguration, Shin Godzilla, Happy Hunting, Cage Dive, Fashionista, Bloodlands, Detour, Raw, Hounds of Love, The Night of the Virgin	
2018	Ghost Stories, The Lodgers (cancelled due to weather), The Wanderers: Quest of the Demon Hunter, Attack of the Bat Monsters, The Ravenous - Les affamés, Cold Skin, Primal Rage, Errementari: The Blacksmith and the Devil, Pyewacket, Friendly Beast, Secret Santa, Tigers are not Afraid - Vuelven, Sixty Minutes to Midnight	
2019	Lords of Chaos, Level 16, The Dead Center, Here Comes Hell, Black Circle, Dead Ant (aka Giant Killer Ants), The Rusalka (aka The Siren), Automata, Finale, The Witch: Part 1 The Subversion, Freaks, The Hoard	
2020	Synchronic, Death of a Vlogger, The Cleansing Hour + Cubicle + Live Forever, In the Quarry + Black Mass, Sea Fever + Simon Boswell, A Ghost Waits, The Mortuary Collection, A Night Of Horror: Nightmare Radio (rescheduled to earlier due to technical issues), Zombie For Sale, Saint Maud, Butt Boy + Fatale Collective: Bleed, VFW, Anderson Falls	
2021	Run Hide Fight, The Old Ways, The Woman With Leopard Shoes, Out of This World, Vicious Fun and American Badger. Short films Special Delivery and Eye Exam were also included.	FrightFest Glasgow took place online between Friday 5 March and Sunday 7 March. An in person event was not possible due to COVID-19 restrictions.
2022	Night's End, Let The Wrong One In, A Cloud So High, Homebound, You Are Not My Mother, Wyrmwood Apocalypse, Mandrake, The Ledge, Some Like It Rare, Monstrous, Freaks Out, and The Cellar.	
2023	Smoking Causes Coughing, Sisu, #chadgetstheaxe, Irati, Mother Superior, Winnie the Pooh: Blood and Honey, Pensive, Hunt Her, Kill Her, Onyx the Fortuitous and the Talisman of Souls, Consecration, Little Bone Lodge, Here For Blood, 13 Exorcisms	
2024	You'll Never Find Me, The Soul Eater, The Deep Dark, The Invisible Raptor, Wake Up, Kill Your Lover, Mom, The Funeral, Custom, The Well, All You Need is Death, Last Straw Shorts shown during the festival: Mouse from Ewan J Fletcher and Subject 73 from Reiff Gaskell.	
2025	Psyche, House of Ashes, The Last Sacrifice, By the Throat, The Doom Busters, In Our Blood, A Mother's Embrace, Hearts of Darkness: The Making of the Final Friday, The American Backyard, Scared to Death, and Rumplestiltskin.	
2026	Jailbroken, Bury the Devil, Bone Keeper, Boorman and the Devil, The Restoration at Grayson Manor, The Curse, Violence, The Convenience Store, Red Riding, Karmadonna, and Deathkeeper.	

=== FF Glasgow 2025 ===
The 2025 edition took place on 6, 7 and 8 March at the Glasgow Film Theatre.

== Extra FrightFest Events ==
Extra FrightFest events are listed below:

Date	Location	Event	Notes
2005	Vue Cinemas, Leicester Square	Descent premiere	In 2005 FrightFest helmed a gala preview of The Descent attended by Dir. Neil Marshall and the cast. The event was held at The Vue Cinema Leicester Square.
2004-2006	Brighton, UK	Brighton CineCity festival	CineCity 2004 Creep with Dir. Christopher Smith, The Last Horror Movie with Dir. Julian Richards CineCity 2005 Masters of Horror: Jenifer, Boo, District 13. At this event a FrightFester showed their FrightFest original eye logo tattoo. CineCity 2006 Gone, The Raven, Vampire Diaries with director and cast.
2004-2007	The Broadway Cinema; The Phoenix Arts Centre; Cambridge, UK	On Tour	Nottingham - The Broadway Cinema 2004 Dawn of the Dead, The Machinist, The Last Horror Movie, Monster Man Leicester - The Phoenix Arts Centre 2004 The Machinist, Creep with Dir. Christopher Smith, Monster Man Cambridge 2004 Bubba Ho-tep, The Locals, The Last Horror Movie, Blueberry. Cambridge 2005 R-Point, Shallow Ground, The Devil's Rejects, Dead Meat. Cambridge 2007 End of the Line, Hell's Ground, The Abandoned, All The Boys Love Mandy Lane, Motel Hell.
May 2005	Princes Charles Cinema	League of Gentlemen Day	One day event returning to the PCC held in May 2005. A day built around the audience premiere of The League of Gentlemen's movie debut. The day started with a film selected by a League member. It also saw the audience premiere of Rob Zombie's The Devil's Rejects. From Beyond the Grave introduced by Mark Gatiss, R-Point, Shallow Ground, The League of Gentlemen's Apocalypse with Jeremy Dyson; Reece Shearsmith and Steve Pemberton, Neil Marshall and Nora Jane Noone with a sneak preview trailer of The Descent, Sin City (another surprise movie), The Devil's Rejects.
March 2006	Princes Charles Cinema	Hostel Day	March 2006. A one-off event once more at the PCC. Built around an early showing of Eli Roth's Hostel with two films chosen by Roth. Death Trance, The Wicker Man with pre-recorded intro' by Eli Roth, Mortuary, Hostel with pre-recorded Eli Roth intro, Theatre of Blood introduced by Kim Newman.
2007-2008	Rex Bar, London Soho	Lionsgate Horrorthon	Event run in conjunction with Lionsgate. The 70-seat screen at the Rex Bar in London's Soho means that audience attendance is allotted by competition. 2007 Saw III screening of extended edition, Blood Trails with star Rebecca Palmer, Snuff-Movie. 2008 Saw IV screening of extended edition, Catacombs, Bug and 20 min preview of Five Across The Eyes.
19 April 2008	Coronet Cinema, Notting Hill	Dario Argento at the Coronet	19 April 2008 at the Coronet Cinema, Notting Hill, London. Dario Argento introduced his latest film, The Mother of Tears. Also showing as part of the day were Cannibals – Welcome to the Jungle and an encore screening of Storm Warning.
21 April 2008	One Aldwych	An evening with Jessica Alba	The UK premiere of The Eye 2008 remake. Film was shown in the screening room of One Aldwych. Jessica Alba introduced the movie, stayed for a Q&A session and signed memorabilia.
3 May 2008	Odeon, Leicester Square, London	D-Day with Neil Marshall	A day at the OWE dedicated to director Neil Marshall. Dog Soldiers, The Descent and Doomsday were all screened with introductions by Marshall. Question and answer sessions followed each movie. In attendance were Neil Marshall, Sean Pertwee, Darren Morfitt, Chris Robson, Leslie Simpson, Shauna MacDonald, Saskia Mulder, Alex Reid, MyAnna Buring, Nora Jane Noone, Alexander Siddig and Axelle Carolyn An exclusive to the event poster was designed by Graham Humphreys and was exceptionally limited.
24 May 2009	ICA, London	Drag Me to Hell with Sam Raimi	Frightfest, in conjunction with the ICA and Lionsgate, played host to the first UK showing of Drag Me to Hell. In attendance were Sam Raimi, Justin Long and Alison Lohman.
2009	Prince Charles Cinema	Spring Awakening Day 2009	Frightfest returned to the Prince Charles Cinema for a one-day event. Embodiment Of Evil, Shuttle, Repo! The Genetic Opera with director Darren Lynn Bousman, Lesbian Vampire Killers world audience premiere with director Phil Clayton with actress MyAnna Buring and the rest of the female cast members, Not Quite Hollywood, Turkey Shoot.
26 May 2010	Coronet Cinema, Notting Hill	Black Death World Premiere	On 26 May 2010, FrightFesters and horror fans alike were lucky enough to attend the World Premiere of Chris Smith's Black Death, courtesy of Revolver Entertainment. Cast and Crew were in attendance.
Tuesday 26 June 2012	Cineworld, Haymarket, London	Storage24	FrightFest hosted a free preview screening of the film Storage 24 on Tuesday 26 June 2012 at Cineworld Haymarket, London. The screening was attended by director Johannes Roberts and lead actor Noel Clarke.
Friday 12 January to Friday 18 January 2013	Princes Charles Cinema, London; FilmHouse, Edinburgh; Glasgow Film Theatre; Sheffield, Showroom; Leeds, Hyde Park Picturehouse; Bristol, Watershed; Brighton, Duke of York	American Mary Cinema Tour 2013	FrightFest hosted a cinema tour to promote the film American Mary, the directors Soska sisters and lead actor Katharine Isabelle were present on the tour, introducing the film and taking part in post-show question and answer sessions at each screening.
Thursday 18 April 2013	Prince Charles Cinema, London	ABCs of Death	FrightFest hosted a special preview screening of The ABCs of Death at Prince Charles Cinema, London on Thursday 18 April 2013. Special guests on the night were: Ben Wheatley, Lee Hardcastle, Jake West, Lucy Clements, Simon Rumley and Simon Boswell.
Saturday 1 February 2014	Princes Charles Cinema	Iron Sky: Director's Cut	FrightFest hosted a screening of Iron Sky Dictator's Cut at the Prince Charles Cinema on Saturday 1 February 2014. Special guests attending were director Timo Vuorensola and producer Tero Kaukomaa.
Tuesday 1 April 2014	Cineworld, Haymarket, London	The Raid 2	FrightFest hosted a special free preview screening of The Raid 2: Berandal at Cineworld Haymarket, London, on Tuesday 1 April 2014. The screening was attended by director Gareth Evans and stars Iko Uwais and Yayan Ruhian, who also staged a demonstration fight during the post-screening Q&A. Tickets were given away free and were all allocated in 20-minutes.
Wednesday 4 June 2014	Princes Charles Cinema	Oculus	FrightFest hosted a free preview screening of Oculus at Prince Charles Cinema, London, on Wednesday 4 June 2014.
Monday 23 June 2014	Vue Cinemas, London	Cold in July	FrightFest hosted a free preview screening of Cold in July at Vue Cinemas, West End, London, on Monday 23 June 2014. The screening was attended by director Jim Mickle who introduce the film and took part in a post screening Q&A.
Thursday 3 July 2014	Prince Charles Cinema	Video Nasties: Draconian Days Documentary	FrightFest hosted the London Premiere of Nucleus Films documentary Video Nasties: Draconian Days at Prince Charles Cinema on Thursday 3 July 2014 at 8.30PM. The event was hosted by Paul McEvoy and feature a post screening Q&A with director Jake West, Marc Morris, Alan Jones, David Flint and Julian Petley.

== Blogs ==
Regular blogs are now a feature of the festival's website. They began with The Alan Jones Diary and a guide to DVDs Gore in the Store. Recently it has grown to include more blogs which cover Video Games, TV, the Australian horror scene, foreign language genre fare, HD format releases, Memorabilia and Comics.

The 2009 annual redesign of the website added two more blogs and a regular review blog from Alan Jones.

The organisers of the festival blog annually about their visits to the Cannes Film Festival and the Fantastic Fest in Austin Texas.

== FrightFest Originals ==
Launched in August 2012, FrightFest Originals is a range of limited edition posters featuring new artwork for classic and modern feature films. Posters can be purchased through the dedicated FrightFest Originals online website or at FrightFest events.

== FrightFest Presents ==
In 2005 a "FrightFest Presents" DVD label was created and briefly distributed Dead Meat, Malefique, Tears of Kali, Eyes of Crystal and The Roost within the UK. The label was an imprint of Revolver Entertainment. In 2015, the label was revived in cooperation with Icon Film Distribution. Films released from October 2015 are Night of the Living Deb, Some Kind of Hate, Last Girl Standing, Aaaaaaaah!, Afterdeath, Landmine Goes Click, Emelie, The Lesson, Estranged.

== FrightFest Features ==
On 23 May 2011 FrightFest Features DVD label was launched, the first 2 DVDs released were both films that had previously played in the festival: Italian director Federico Zampaglione's 2007 film Shadow and the 2007 New Zealand action comedy The Devil Dared Me To. Films will be released theatrically and for home entertainment, the label is launched in conjunction with Wild Bunch.

== Quiz ==
In 2005 the FrightFest quiz was introduced. The first quiz was spread over the weekend but was then streamlined. In 2007 the quiz was devised by Alan Jones, who often hosts the quiz.

2010 saw the introduction of Andy Nyman's Quiz from Hell, an audiovisual horror movie quiz hosted by Andy Nyman. This quiz was last presented in 2013. The quiz is currently presented as "The FrightFest quiz".

== Ticketing ==
Tickets are sold with the option of a weekend pass or individual tickets. 2007 saw the introduction of Day Passes. Weekend passes go on sale, typically, in July each year with individual tickets on sale a month later. Tickets are bought online, by phone or in person.

Since 2005, a growing group have congregated in person to buy tickets for the festival. The start time of this queue has been earlier each year earning it the nickname "The Sleepy Queue".

== See also ==
- List of fantastic and horror film festivals
- Grimmfest
