= Patrick Rea =

American producer, writer and director (born 1980)

- Occupation: Filmmaker
- Notable work: Nailbiter; I Am Lisa

Patrick Rea is an American producer, writer and director known for the films Nailbiter, I Am Lisa, They Wait in the Dark and The Last Butterflies.

== Career ==
Rea began creating short films in 2002. He collaborated with Ryan Jones and Josh Robison to found the company SenoReality Pictures, which was a winner in Fangoria's Blood Drive contest. He continued to direct short films, some of which have screened at festivals such as Shriekfest LA and have shown on FangoriaTV, Horror Channel and n8studios.com.

His first full-length film, The Empty Acre, was completed in 2006 and premiered at the Kansas International Film Festival. The DVD was released and nationally distributed in summer 2007. Rea went on to co-direct the 2010 Showtime special Jake Johannsen: I Love You and in 2012, directed the featurette Rhino. The following year he released the indie horror flick Nailbiter and in 2020, released I Am Lisa. His supernatural thriller They Wait in the Dark was released in early 2023. Later that year, Rea directed the short film The Last Butterflies starring Cooper Andrews. In 2024 Rea's found footage vampire film The Night Is Young was released.
