= Black Ops (film) =

2019 film

- Film poster
- Directed by: Tom Paton
- Written by: Tom Paton
- Produced by: George Burt; Alexa Waugh
- Starring: Rachel Warren; Simon Meacock; Bentley Kalu; Samantha Schnitzler; Shayne Ward; Toby Osmond
- Cinematography: George Burt
- Music by: Max Sweiry
- Distributed by: Kaleidoscope Film Distribution; Bird Box Distribution
- Release dates: 26 August 2019 (FrightFest); 12 June 2020
- Running time: 103 minutes
- Country: United Kingdom
- Language: English

Black Ops, also known as The Ascent or Stairs, is a 2019 independent action horror film directed by Tom Paton.

== Plot ==
A special ops military team find themselves stuck on an endless staircase and must fix their past sins against civilians or die on the stairs.

== Cast ==
- Shayne Ward as Will Stanton
- Bentley Kalu as Ben Garrett
- Samantha Schnitzler as Kia Clarke
- Alana Wallace as Hayley Nolan
- Toby Osmond as Jack Ford
- Sophie Austin as Emma Walker
- Spencer Collings as Carter Harris
- Simon Meacock as Shaun Buxton
- Phoebe Robinson-Galvin as Rachel Ryan
- Julia Szamalek as The Prisoner
- Matt Malecki as Mateus
- Rachel Warren as The Mother
- Piotr Baumann as Pavel

== Release ==
The film premiered at the 2019 FrightFest on 26 August, and released on 12 June 2020 as direct to video on demand.

== Reception ==
On the review aggregator website Rotten Tomatoes, 67% of 9 critics' reviews are positive. It is described by reviewers as being either military horror, or action and horror.
