= Cult of VHS =

2021 documentary film

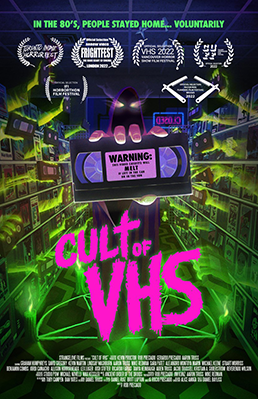
- Official Poster
- Directed by: Rob Preciado
- Produced by: Aaron Truss; Rob Preciado; Gerardo Preciado; Kevin Proctor
- Edited by: Rob Preciado; Aaron Truss
- Music by: Ancient Order of The Droids; Infra Violet
- Production companies: Strangelove Films; Q Cumber Films; Studio POW
- Release date: August 28, 2022
- Running time: 90 minutes
- Countries: Mexico, United Kingdom
- Language: English

Cult of VHS is a 2022 documentary film directed by Rob Preciado, that focuses on the age of VHS, eccentric collectors from around the globe, and the video nasties that became the centre of a controversial debate on censorship in the eighties and nineties.

== Interviewees ==
- Graham Humphreys
- David Gregory
- Aaron Truss
- Kevin Martin
- Josh Stifter
- Aiden Truss
- Michael Keene
- Lindsay Washburn
- Jordi Camacho
- Mike Redman
- Stuart Morriss
- Kristian A Söderström
- Jacob Trussell
- Allison Watters
- Reverendo Wilson
- Benjamin Combes
- Ricardo Farias
- Tanya Heinbaugh

== Production ==
Director Rob Preciado was inspired to develop Cult of VHS after suffering episodes of depression during the COVID-19 lockdowns. Preciado wanted to create a ‘feel-good’ film that presented global views on the VHS format and the stories of people’s experiences of home videos from different countries. It was at that stage in production that Preciado met producer Aaron Truss, a filmmaker who was just as passionate about the project and VHS. Preciado’s brother Gerardo Preciado also joined the project as producer during the early stages of production, having both worked on several short films together. Gerardo also provided the soundtrack to the film. The documentary was also crowdfunded via Kickstarter, with the production taking around two years to complete.

During the production of the film, producer Kevin Proctor had scheduled an interview with Martin Myres, son of distributor Michael Myres (whose name was taken by John Carpenter for the name of The Shape in Halloween). However, the interview was canceled due to a member of the crew testing positive for COVID-19. Most of the interviews filmed for the documentary were conducted on location by the interview subjects due to the first wave of the pandemic, this included people from Italy, France, Australia, Canada, The Netherlands, and Mexico. Due to both Rob and Gerardo being based in Mexico during the production, Aaron Truss created a UK team consisting of Toby Campen, Dan Yates, Britt Lupton, and Alice Amata to accommodate post-production schedules.

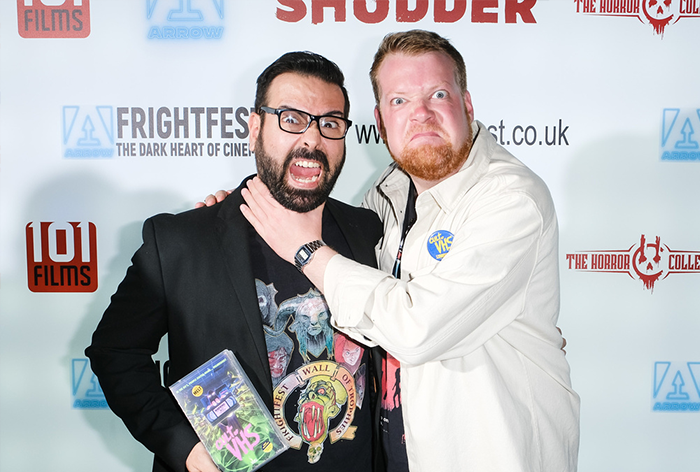
Rob Preciado and Aaron Truss attending the premiere of Cult of VHS at FrightFest 2022.

Before the film’s release at London’s FrightFest in 2022, Preciado had VHS copies of the documentary made for publicity purposes. Meanwhile, Truss attended the FrightFest screening with fellow filmmaker Jake West, who gave the film his approval. Graham Humphreys stated that he was glad to appear in Cult of VHS and to talk about his artwork almost forty years later.

== Release ==
Cult of VHS received its world premiere at FrightFest on August 28, 2022. and it received its Latin American premiere at Morbido. The film would go on to screen at Razor Reel Flanders Film Festival in Brugge, as well as Horrorthon at the Irish Film Institute on October 29, 2022. The following month, the documentary had its Canadian premiere at the Vancouver Horror Show Festival 2022. The film had its final public screening in 2023 at the B Movie Underground & Trash Film Festival on September 3rd in the Netherlands.

== Critical reception ==
Jennie Kermode of Eye for Film awarded it a score of four out of five, saying, "this is an entertaining film from start to finish, and an informative take on a phenomenon which reshaped cinema forever." Ior Gislason of Hear Us Scream was also supportive of the film in his review, saying, "It’s a beautiful, nostalgic labour of love and an overall great watch!" David S. Smith of Horror Cult Films awarded it a positive review, saying, "And maybe the main success of this doc was it made me feel emotional about something I didn’t even realise I missed." Shaun Munro of FlickeringMyth awarded it three out of five stars, saying, "Cult of VHS is a passionate window into the enduring fandom of the medium."

Writing for Starburst Magazine, Martin Unsworth was more critical of the film, saying, "Cult of VHS might be superfluous as a historical document, but it’s entertaining enough for those of us that like to reminisce." Joel Harley of Horror DNA awarded it a score of four of out of five stars, saying, "Cult of VHS does admirable work in exploring the medium’s present and future." Kat Hughes of The Hollywood News awarded it a score of three out of five stars, calling it "An informed documentary that beautifully champions the life of a defunct media format." Aubry Norman of Grimoire of Horror awarded it a score of 3.5 out of five, saying, "the film is an absolute joy to watch and offers interesting insights–whether you are a member of the cult or not." Kim Newman found the film relatively entertaining, commenting on the diversity of the film's subjects, stating, “it refreshingly takes in voices from Mexico, Australia, Holland, and other countries”.
