= Sadik 2 =

- Theatrical poster
- Directed by: Robin Entreinger
- Written by: Robin Entreinger; Jean-Nicolas Laurent
- Produced by: Robin Entreinger; Vincent Michaud
- Starring: Alexandra Bialy; Valentin Bonhomme; Mathieu Coniglio; Marjolaine Pottlitzer
- Cinematography: Virginie Trottet
- Edited by: Robin Entreinger
- Production company: 2017 Films
- Distributed by: 2017 Films
- Release date: 23 August 2013 (FrightFest)
- Running time: 76 minutes
- Country: France
- Language: French

Sadik 2 is a 2013 French horror film that was directed by Robin Entreinger. The film had its world premiere on 23 August 2013 at the London FrightFest Film Festival and centers upon a group of friends that finds themselves hunted by a sadistic killer.

The film's title implies that it is the second film in a series but is actually the first film, as Entreinger thought that it would be interesting to film a "sequel" before creating the first film. Sadik 2 references the fictional first film by having the characters reference it by commenting that Sadik became popular due to rumors that it was a snuff film, as all of the actors were genuinely murdered on camera.

== Plot ==
A group of friends has decided to head out to a secluded rental house in order to hang out and hold a New Year's Eve party. Each party goer has their own plans to make the night memorable, but they're ill-prepared for when one of the group goes missing and someone begins picking them off one by one.

== Cast ==
- Alexandra Bialy as Isa
- Valentin Bonhomme as Kevin
- Mathieu Coniglio as Fred
- Guillaume Gamand as Franck
- Guillaume Levil as Marco
- Guillaume Moiton as Antoine
- Marjolaine Pottlitzer as Gwendo
- Léon Vitale as Al

== Production ==
While developing the film Entreinger wanted to "play with the basics of horror films". He described it by saying that he "wanted to do a sort of soap TV show that goes into horror afterwards. So you have two stories; the TV show that looks like a TV comedy stuff, and then it goes into horror. Entreinger and his co-writer Jean-Nicolas Laurent wanted to make a film similar to the Scream and Saw franchises and they decided to make the film sequel before making the initial film, which is referenced in the film's title of Sadik 2. It took Entreinger AND Laurent about two to three weeks to complete the script for Sadik 2, which they wrote in Laurent's apartment. Filming took place over a seven-day period and the crew shot on average 10 sequences a day. This was made somewhat more difficult as part of the filming had to be shot in a basement that was not part of the house used for another location, necessitating that the crew move between the two locations.

== Reception ==
What Culture and Grolsch Film Works both panned the film, and What Culture wrote "Though wearing its meta tone on its sleeve, Sadik 2 takes far too long to engage with its twisty concept, and is painfully subject to a subterranean budget." Screen Daily was mixed in their review and they commented that "It is well-acted and written and the first half almost works as character drama, though surprisingly little is made of the victims’ shared history in care. However, all that goes out the window when the slaughter starts. The snuff scenes are horrid but filmed with some restraint, evoking the added-on coda of the 1978 exploitation effort Snuff in the depiction of the killer filmmakers as part of a regular industry, just trying to get the job done, bitching about the chores they have to do because they’re understaffed and falling behind schedule."
