= Evil Things =

- Directed by: Dominic Perez
- Written by: Dominic Perez
- Produced by: Dominic Perez; Mario Valdez Steckler
- Starring: Laurel Casillo; Morgan Hooper; Ryan Maslyn; Elyssa Mersdorf; Torrey Weiss; Gail Cadden
- Cinematography: Laurel Casillo; Moran Hooper; Ryan Maslyn; Elyssa Mersdorf; Dominic Perez; Mario Valdez Steckler; Torrey Weiss
- Edited by: Dominic Perez
- Production company: Go Show Media
- Distributed by: Plum County Pictures
- Release date: 2009
- Running time: 86 minutes
- Country: United States
- Language: English

Evil Things is a 2009 American horror film written and directed by Dominic Perez as his feature film debut.

== Plot ==
Five college students leave New York City for a weekend in the country, and 48 hours later they vanished without a trace.

To celebrate Miriam's (Elyssa Mersdorf) birthday, Miriam's Aunt Gail (Gail Cadden) gives her use of a large country home in the Catskills for the weekend. Miriam invites her friends Cassy (Laurel Casillo), Mark (Morgan Hooper), Tanya (Torrey Weiss) and Leo (Ryan Maslyn) to join her to celebrate.

As an aspiring filmmaker, Leo brings his new video camera, hoping to create a short documentary of the weekend getaway. The five begin driving to the house. Whilst looking for a place to pull over because Tanya is carsick, the group notice they are being bothered by a dark red van whose driver incessantly honks his horn at them and overtakes them only to slow down in front of them. They pass the van and continue on. They stop at a small gas station where Cassy notices a dark red van pull in and slow down.

Spooked, the gang leave. As they are driving away, a girl from inside the gas station stops them to hand over a phone Cassy left in the bathroom. The group continue to Aunt Gail's home and are again tailed by the van. They stop at a diner and while eating, the van pulls into the diner parking lot and drives slowly by the window. Furious, Mark storms outside to confront the driver but he drives away when Mark gets too close.

The group eventually make it to the house and Aunt Gail comes to turn the power on and wish them a good night. The five surprise Miriam with a birthday cake and then party and drink with Leo filming the whole occasion.

The next day the group take a hike to the snowy woods, where they soon get lost in the dark. They hear noises that they can't identify, crackling sounds on their two-way-radio and branches snapping which scares them all into running. They eventually make it back to the house without further incident. Later, eating dinner, they receive silent phone calls. Then a knock at the door is heard and Mark finds a video tape wrapped in brown paper on the front step.

The tape reveals that the group have been secretly video taped since they were on the road, and are being stalked by the same person in the maroon van. There is footage of them at the gas station with the girl running out to give Cassy back her phone, and them at the diner when Mark attempted to confront the driver of the van, establishing that it's the same van which has been following them the whole time. Then the footage follows them to Aunt Gail's house and shows film taken through the windows of the group laughing and having fun, surprising Miriam with her birthday cake, and to their horror, the stalker inside the house filming them all as they slept.

The phone rings again with only silence on the other end, and then the line is cut. None of the group can get a signal on their cell phone. Trying to leave, they find that their car is missing. A van pulls up in the driveway, scaring the group back into the house. As everyone tries to get a signal on their phones again, all the power in the house goes out. Miriam finally gets a signal on her phone and dials 9-1-1, but the call drops out.

Down the hall, the group hear a noise. Mark gets a knife and goes to investigate. He finds a two way radio that is on and crackling. The door suddenly shuts from the inside and Mark's cries of pain can be heard. Cassy bangs on the door and tries to open it, and then it opens just a crack which scares the group into running upstairs to hide.

Upstairs, the group see the van driving away from the house so they come back downstairs to leave. Leo gives the camera to Tanya and leads the way out, but once outside he sees something that makes him scream at the others to run back inside. Once inside, Tanya falls, breaking the camera and leaving the viewer with only audio of Tanya screaming. Leo's fate is left unknown.

On the video footage taken from the van outside, Miriam is shown to be running from the house. The van turns on its lights and creeps along to follow her, before stopping - the stalker then gets out and chases a screaming Miriam into the woods.

Back inside the house, the other stalker is looking around the house for Cassy with his camera set to nightvision. He spots her coming out from her hiding place behind a couch, and then wandering the house blindly in the dark. The stalker follows her, watching how far she will get. Cassy gets to the door but, it is pulled shut from the outside, and the camera man makes the same sound the group heard in the woods alerting Cassy of his presence. She screams as he then lunges out at her, and the camera freezes on Cassy's screaming face.

The view pulls back and shows to a dark room were the stalker is watching several videos on many monitors. As well as the stalkers footage, there is also the footage Leo shot implying the stalkers stole his camera.

The last piece of film shows the stalker with the camera in a park, surveying groups of friends. While looking around he spots another group of friends filming. He then follows them on their trip.

During the end credits the video of the stalker's movements are shown from the moment he first spotted the group on the highway, following them to the house and filming them through the windows as they sleep.

== Background ==
Shot in found footage mockumentary style in the valleys surrounding New York City, the film is about a group of twenty-somethings in a relative's vacation home, captured as 'real footage' on a video camera, with the actors themselves serving as cinematographers. The film took three months to write, seven days to shoot, and one month to edit.

== Release ==
The film was released to multiple film festivals beginning in early 2009, including the Long Island Film Festival, the Hello Darkness Film Festival in Melbourne, Australia, and the Edmonton International Film Festival. It had its British premiere on August 29, 2009, in Leicester Square as part of Channel 4's London FrightFest Film Festival. There film was released on DVD and Blu-ray Disc.

== Critical reception ==
BlogCritics made note that the film's elements were "reminiscent of Spielberg's debut Duel as well as the likes of Jeepers Creepers, Blair Witch Project, and Paranormal Activity, and while the film's concept was not original, it "is a well executed low-budget thriller," with the reviewer remarking that "the biggest complaint I have about it is that it feels a tad long with too little actually happening." Dread Central wrote that while it was another "found footage film", after speaking with him, they were willing to give director Dominic Perez the benefit of the doubt. They offered this quote from Perez himself: "It took me 3 months to write Evil Things, 7 days to shoot it, and 1 month to edit it, but it took me 41 years to finally believe that I could make it happen." Twitch Film wrote that the film was meandering, aiming for authenticity in its scares but missing the mark, commenting that it was the "'free-form' dialogue from each of the five victims forces the authenticity; raising and lowering the tension immediately and in the process spiralling as far from reality as possible." However, they did note the film was well shot: "for a handheld piece the frozen vistas are quite remarkable and the winter holiday home is an excellent set piece for that unmistakable feeling of 'middle of nowhere'," but concluded that despite the location, once the actors begin their dialog, "the film loses its gravitas." The website concluded that the film "offers an interesting end in the form of the killers' point of view, but the nifty convention is ultimately lost in the mediocrity that came before it." JoBlo.com compared the film to both Blair Witch and The Lord of the Rings "because for the better part of the movie, nothing much happens. But when the shit does hit the fan, it does so in a grand fashion that leaves you retarded on the floor and cowering in fear/excitement". They noted that while much of the film's early dialog was tedious and boring, the final 30 minutes when the reviewer felt that as a hand-held film, it finally delivered the excitement that was anticipated. They wrote that the actors did a great job of leading up to the final moments, doing "great job of carrying the film, and keeping the audience intrigued right to the final screams," offering that "the horror of the payoff here feels personal, like it is actually happening, which is hard to accomplish in any movie". The reviewer also appreciated how the film was put together, as if edited by the killer himself after his deeds were done, with additional footage seemingly shot by the killer himself edited into that taken by his victims. Action Flick Chick wrote that the film was a "slow starter", but that the "ending does give you a little bit of a creep out factor, though." Horror review site Life After Undeath panned the movie stating that "Evil Things is every mock documentary ever made" and that they "can only recommend Evil Things for people who think The Ils Witch Activity would make a good movie, and then only if you liked the worst parts of each of those movies."
