= Clapboard Jungle =

Clapboard Jungle: Surviving the Independent Film Business
- Film poster
- Directed by: Justin McConnell
- Cinematography: Justin McConnell
- Edited by: Kevin Burke; Justin McConnell
- Music by: Sean Motley
- Release date: 5 June 2020 (Superchannel Canadian Film Fest)
- Running time: 98 minutes
- Country: Canada
- Language: English

Clapboard Jungle: Surviving the Independent Film Business is a 2020 documentary film about working in the film business directed by Justin McConnell.

== Development ==
McConnell came up with the idea for the documentary after making his third film, Skull World, as it "struck me that a really simple, but effective thing that I could create would be what at the time I set out to make as sort of a film school in a box; the kind of thing that I wish existed ten years earlier, so that I could turn to it, or that as a younger filmmaker I could get a better indication of at least a path you could follow".

== Release ==
Clapboard Jungle had its world premiere on 6 June 2020 at the Superchannel Canadian Film Fest. It went on to screen at other film festivals that included FrightFest, where it received the award for Best Documentary.

The documentary was released digitally on January 19, 2021, via Gravitas Ventures and Kamidaze Dogfight.

== Reception ==
Critical reception for Clapboard Jungle has been positive. Common praise for the film centered upon McConnell's choice to focus the documentary on himself, which PopHorror called "a bold choice", and the portrayal of the difficulties faced in indie film production. Flickering Myth noted that "Crucially, despite McConnell directing this film himself, it manages to avoid feeling like a navel-gazing vanity project." Rachel Reeves of Rue Morgue also praised the film, writing that it was "a rare and intimate peek behind the curtain of indie filmmaking."
