= I Am Lisa =

2020 American horror film

- Film poster
- Directed by: Patrick Rea
- Written by: Eric Winkler
- Cinematography: Hanuman Brown-Eagle
- Music by: Natalia Perez
- Production company: Feed the Queen
- Distributed by: Mutiny Pictures
- Release date: July 2, 2020
- Running time: 92 minutes
- Country: United States
- Language: English

I Am Lisa is a 2020 horror revenge film that was directed by Patrick Rea, based on a script written by Eric Winkler.

== Synopsis ==
Lisa Leroux runs a bookstore left to her by her deceased grandmother. She is bullied by Jess, the local drug dealer. Jess steals a rare book from the store. Later, when the two are alone in the bookstore, Jess sexually assaults her.

Lisa tries to report the crime to the local police, but sheriff Deborah "Deb" is Jess's mom, and deputy Nick is Deb's brother, and they both dismiss her. Deb arranges for Lisa to be viciously assaulted and taken out to the woods. They leave her there expecting wolves to finish her off. Lisa survives the encounter but still suffer wolf bites, which turn her into a werewolf. Lisa makes it to the home of her friend Sam, who is horrified by what has happened.

Unbeknownst to Lisa, Deb is fully aware of werewolves' existence. She had previously beaten and left another girl, Lisa's cousin Gretchen, for the wolves to maul. The girl had survived and became a werewolf, making it necessary for Deb and the others to hunt and kill her. It is also implied that Deb was responsible for the death of the previous sheriff, who had also been mauled to death.

As Lisa's transformation continues, she tracks down and kills those who wronged her, beginning with Millie. She also kills Dana after she threatens Sam, as well as Jess and Nick for trashing her bookstore. In an attempt to stop Lisa, Deb holds Sam hostage and orders Lisa to come to the station.

Lisa tries to sneak up on Deb but is subdued. Deb orders one of her subordinates, Dolphus, to nail Lisa's arms together, after which she reveals that she is going to cut off Lisa's arms and leave her to bleed to death. She also reveals that she was responsible for Gretchen's death, after which she taunts Lisa by cutting off a lock of Sam's hair to test her blade's sharpness. This, along with the rise of the full moon, causes Lisa to fully transform into a werewolf. Lisa slaughters Dolphus and Deb is captured.

When Deb awakens to discover Lisa's plan to leave her to the wolves. As Lisa walks away, the wolves set upon Deb.

== Cast ==
- Kristen Vaganos as Lisa Leroux
- Jennifer Seward as Sam
- Manon Halliburton as Sheriff Deborah Huckins
- Carmen Anello as Jessica Huckins
- Chris Bylsma as Deputy Nick Huckins
- Cinnamon Schultz as Mary Huckins
- Sarah McGuire as Dana
- Millie Milan as Millie
- Shawn Eric Jones as Dolphus
- Brooklyn Funk as Brooke
- Owen Winkler as Bicycle Boy

== Production ==
Having previously worked for The Kansas City Star, screenwriter Eric Winkler began writing the first draft of the film's script in 2016, and continued working on it through 2019. At the time he began on the draft, Winkler "just wanted to do something creative." He chose to further pursue screenwriting and the script after the death of his father in 2018. Winkler has stated that I Am Lisa is "an homage to every revenge movie I’ve ever seen" and that “It was also heavily influenced by any movie that features a strong female protagonist, like Aliens, Kill Bill, and Day of the Dead.”

Winkler approached Rea during some of his film screenings, both early in the script's development process and later, when the idea was more fully formed. Rea enjoyed the idea of a revenge film, as well as that it was female-driven and in the werewolf genre, and agreed to direct. He suggested that Winkler change more of the characters to women, as the majority were male and he felt that this would make the movie "a lot more interesting" and "play better today". Kristen Vaganos was brought on to play the titular role of Lisa before the script was finalized.

Principal photography for I Am Lisa began in July 2019 and the majority of the footage was shot over a period of 14 days, with the exception of some pick-up shots taken in the following months. Some of the filming locations included an abandoned police station and a bookstore inside Kansas City.

== Release ==
I Am Lisa premiered at the Boulevard Drive-In in Kansas City, Kansas on July 2, 2020, after which it screened at the August digital edition of FrightFest, on August 28.

== Reception ==
Critical reception has been positive. Common praise centered on Rea's direction of the film and the character of Lisa, which Starburst called likeable. Elements of criticism included the lycanthropic makeup and some of the film's lines. I Am Lisa has a rating of 91% on the review aggregator site, Rotten Tomatoes. The site's critical consensus reads, "A werewolf revenge flick with bite, I Am Lisa is a vibrant and intellectually nimble journey into female empowerment."
