= Black Mold (film) =

2023 American horror film

- Promotional release poster
- Directed by: John Pata
- Written by: John Pata
- Starring: Agnes Albright; Andrew Bailes; Caito Aase; Jeremy Holm
- Production companies: Head Trauma Productions; The Line Film Company; Shatterglass Pictures
- Release date: April 15, 2023 (Panic Fest)
- Country: United States
- Language: English

Black Mold is a 2023 American psychological horror thriller film written and directed by John Pata. It stars Agnes Albright and Andrew Bailes as a pair of photographers who, while exploring an abandoned building, encounter a squatter (Jeremy Holm) who causes one of the photographers' traumatic memories of her father to resurface.

Black Mold premiered at the 10th Panic Fest on April 15, 2023, in Kansas City, Missouri.

== Cast ==
- Agnes Albright as Brooke Konrad
- Andrew Bailes as Tanner Behlman
- Jeremy Holm as The Man Upstairs
- Caito Aase

== Production ==
=== Writing and development ===
Writer-director John Pata conceived the idea for Black Mold in 2016 while exploring a dilapidated house. At the time, Pata was struggling with depression; he wrote a brief outline for the film, revisiting it and developing it in late 2020, after having attended therapy for his mental health struggles.

=== Filming ===
Shooting began in March 2022 in Rantoul, Illinois, and lasted for about one month.

== Release ==
Black Mold premiered at the 10th Panic Fest on April 15, 2023, at the Screenland Armour theater in Kansas City, Missouri. The film screened at FrightFest in London, England, on August 25, 2023.

== Reception ==
Grace Detwiler of Rue Morgue commended the film for its direction, cinematography, and production design, but criticized its characterization, as well as the execution of its themes. However, Detwiler noted that, "the scares offered up by the film's final third are worthy of the first two acts' slow burn ... when the slow-growing tension finally comes to a head".
