= The Perished (2019 film) =

Horror film by Paddy Murphy

- Film Poster
- Directed by: Paddy Murphy
- Written by: Paddy Murphy
- Produced by: Paddy Murphy, Vachn Gill, Marie Hourigan, Aaron Walsh, Barry Fahy
- Starring: Courtney McKeon, Paul Fitzgerald, Conor Lambert, Fiach Kunz, Phoebe Murphy, Oisin Robbins, Lisa Tyrrell, Noelle Clarke, Tim Hourigan, Brian O’Regan, Stephen Tubridy
- Cinematography: Barry Fahy
- Edited by: Evan Murphy
- Music by: Aaron Walsh
- Production company: Celtic Badger Media
- Distributed by: The Horror Collective
- Release dates: August 2019 (FrightFest); 7 April 2020 (U.S.)
- Running time: 88 minutes
- Country: Ireland
- Language: English
- Budget: $200,000

The Perished is a 2019 Irish horror film written and directed by Limerick-based indie director Paddy Murphy. The film stars Courtney McKeon, Paul Fitzgerald, Conor Lambert and Fiach Kunz. It was produced under the independent Irish film company Celtic Badger Media, with Barry Fahy, Aaron Walsh, Vachn Gill and Marie Hourigan all serving as producers.

== Plot ==
Sarah Dekker is dealing with the trauma of an abortion. Shunned by her mother and dumped by her boyfriend, she recovers at an old parochial house. Unbeknownst to her the house is the site of a mass baby grave - they need a mother.

== Cast ==
- Courtney McKeon as Sarah Dekker
- Conor Lambert as Richard Dekker
- Fiach Kunz as Shane Daly
- Paul Fitzgerald as Davet Lynch
- Oisin Robbins as Nigel Kiely
- Phoebe Murphy as Nightmare Child
- Lisa Tyrrell as Rebecca Daly (credited as Lisa Tyrell)
- Noelle Clarke as Elaine Dekker
- Brian O’Regan as Shop Assistant
- Stephen Tubridy as Kilin
- Tim Hourigan as Dr. Moylan

== Production ==
Murphy got the idea for the script when he learned of the 800 deceased babies buried at the old Mother and Baby home in Tuam, County Galway, Ireland. He consulted with lead actress Courtney McKeon, to ensure the female characters were "believable and well realised’. The entire film was shot in Limerick, Ireland.

== Release ==
The Perished had its worldwide premiere at FrightFest in 2019.

ScreenAnarchy announced in 2020 that the horror flick would be arriving on DVD in the United States on April 7th.

== Reception ==
The Perished received mostly negative reviews from critics and audiences alike. The Irish Film Critic gave the film a half star out of five, claiming it ‘lacked any depth’ and begged audiences ‘please don’t watch The Perished’.

Brit Flicks gave the film a negative review, saying ‘You hope that films like this serve to shine a light of culpability on the people who wear church doctrine’ but felt the film failed to do this stating that ‘hopefully, the future sees less need to create characters like Sarah Dekker to illustrate the inequity in the eyes of the law for an unmarried, pregnant woman in a 21st century, first world country like Ireland’.

Killer Horror Critic claimed ‘The Perished doesn’t trust its scripting, characters, or actors enough to let them carry the film’ but ended on a slightly more positive note, stating they hoped to see director Paddy Murphy ‘return to pregnancy horrors in the near future’, praising the unique concept.
