= The Gateway (2015 film) =

- Directed by: Jaron Henrie-McCrea
- Produced by: Carys Edwards; Jaron Henrie-McCrea
- Starring: Danni Smith; Tim Lueke; Martin Monahan
- Cinematography: Jaron Henrie-McCrea
- Edited by: Eric Scherbarth
- Production company: Jash Pictures
- Distributed by: Uncork'd Entertainment
- Release date: October 4, 2015
- Running time: 74 minutes
- Country: United States
- Language: English

The Gateway, also known as Curtains, is a 2015 horror film directed by Jaron Henrie-McCrea and starring Danni Smith and Tim Lueke as two activists that investigate a series of disappearing shower curtains in Smith's apartment. The film had its world premiere on August 31, 2015, at Film4 FrightFest.

== Plot ==
Danni has recently left her job as a hospice nurse in order to become an activist for Whale Savers, a whale conservation group. She also leaves the home of her uncle, Gus, moving into a recently vacated apartment in order to get a new start on life. However soon after she gets settled she discovers that her shower curtains have been disappearing. Danni decides to try to record her bathroom overnight in order to discover what is going on, only to find that her shower curtains are disappearing into a strange portal in her shower wall.

She later brings this up with one of her fellow activists, Tim, who eagerly suggests that she put her contact information on a curtain. This way, if someone finds the curtain the person can call Danni and they can discover the portal's destination. They are contacted by Willy, a drifter that tells them that her curtain appeared in a wooded creek near Poughkeepsie, New York. He volunteers to take them to the area he discovered the curtain, but shortly after arriving he begins huffing paint, bringing out a hostile alter ego named Frankie, and attacking the two activists. They manage to escape the area, but as soon as they arrive back to Danni's apartment they are confronted by the Pale Man, who tells Danni that she is bound to the portal and brands her hand with a symbol. She is also cautioned about putting up another curtain. Ignoring the Pale Man, Danni pulls down the tiles on her shower wall and discovers a strange map. She also puts up a curtain and records its disappearance, noting that certain parts of the map glow. Her investigations are not without repercussions and Danni discovers her uncle dead in his home with the same symbol on her hand branded into his forehead. Through her own investigations and some notes made by her uncle, Danni realizes that the glowing sections of the map mark a specific location near the creek and has Tim put up curtains so she can see where it appears.

While she is searching the area Danni discovers one of her shower curtains with a monster inside of it, which chases her until the Pale Man appears with several yokels that routinely monitor the portal in order to kill any monsters that come through. They then make her bury the monsters that have come through the curtains as a result of her experimenting with the shower. They're about to murder her when a new monster appears, giving Danni an opening to escape as the monster kills the Pale Man and his helpers. When the monster turns to Danni, she beats it to death and escapes to her apartment. When she returns to her apartment she realizes that the monster was actually Tim, who had discovered her distress and went through the portal with the curtain in order to rescue her. Distraught, Danni takes a shower curtain and transforms herself into one of the monsters. A tabloid is later shown, revealing that a monster implied to be Danni killed the entire crew of the whaler ship Obake Maru, the ship the two had been sidewalk protesting against.

== Cast ==
- Danni Smith as Danni
- Tim Lueke as Tim
- Martin Monahan as The Pale Man
- Rick Zahn as Uncle Gus
- Chuck McMahon as Bert
- Preston Lawrence as Preston the Super
- Gregory Konow as Willy

== Reception ==
Bloody Disgusting commented that the movie had a limited appeal and that "It’s light fare for those who enjoy films that are outside of convention, but it’s not one that will be on every fan’s list of repeat viewings." Starburst commented that the film would be a hard sell for broad consumption, but that with the film's then title of Curtains and its premise, it "was always going to be one of the year's most original horror films. Thankfully, it also turns out to be one of the best."

Anton Bitel of Sight and Sound also reviewed the movie, stating "Charming and weird enough to get away with its rough edges, it can along the way seem a bit meandering, especially in its focus on Tim's Save the Whales fixation, but in the end every (narrative) hook on this Curtain fits neatly into place."
