= The Mirror (2014 film) =

- Directed by: Edward Boase
- Written by: Edward Boase
- Produced by: Edward Boase; Hamish Moseley; Chris Parsons
- Starring: Jemma Dallender; Joshua Dickinson; Nate Fallows
- Cinematography: Keidrych Wasley
- Edited by: Edward Boase
- Music by: Of Mercia
- Production company: Haunted Mirror
- Release date: 8 September 2014 (FrightFest)
- Running time: 88 minutes
- Country: United Kingdom
- Language: English
- Budget: £20,000

The Mirror is a 2014 British found footage horror film that was directed and written by Edward Boase. The movie had its world premiere on 8 September 2014 at the London FrightFest Film Festival and is based upon a 2013 news article based around a purportedly haunted mirror that left its owners "dogged by bad luck, financial misery, strange sightings and illness".

== Plot ==
Flatmates Jemma, Matt, and Steve have decided to purchase a haunted mirror off of eBay in the hopes of winning the James Randi Foundation's Paranormal Challenge. If they can show proof of supernatural or paranormal activity that can hold up under scientific testing, they will win a million dollars. After receiving the mirror, the trio sets up cameras to record any and all events that occur around the mirror, only to find that this may prove fatal.

== Cast ==
- Jemma Dallender as Jemma
- Joshua Dickinson as Matt
- Nate Fallows as Steve

== Reception ==
Nerdly panned the movie, writing "There are some note-worthy scenes of gore in The Mirror, one of which is completely spoiled by the films poster/DVD cover may I add, but even the most graphic of scenes can't save what is a dull, mundane and ultimately annoying, horror movie." In contrast, Total Film nominated the film for two of their annual "Total Film Frightfest Awards", Best Found-Footage Horror and Scariest Movie.
