= The Night Is Young (2024 film) =

- Directed by: Patrick Rea
- Written by: Patrick Rea
- Produced by: Patrick Rea
- Starring: Sarah McGuire
- Production company: Terror Films
- Release date: 2024
- Language: English

The Night Is Young is a 2024 found footage vampire film written and directed by Patrick Rea.

== Plot ==
The film's plot concerns the vlogger Nora who falls in love with the vampire Emilia. The two end up chased by vampire hunters whom they must escape before dawn.

== Cast ==
- Sarah McGuire - Nora
- Valeri Bates - Amelia
- Jake Jackson - Jake
- Kristin Rea - Max
- Kurt Hanover - Corbis
- Dan Daly - Waits
- Patrick Rea - Filmmaker
- Jamie Morrow - Vanessa
- Andrea Dover - Andrea

== Production ==
Rea co-wrote the film with actress Sarah McGuire, who plays the main character Nora. Filming for the project wrapped in fall 2023. The shooting lasted 12 days.

== Release and reception ==
The film premiered at the Popcorn Frights Film Festival in 2024. The film later released on multiple online platforms on April 28, 2025.

Phil Wheat of Nerdly gave the film a positive review. He states that while the project clearly had a limited budget, the practical effects were still well made by effects artist Jake Jackson. Wheat also noted that the film is more of a hybrid film than a straight found footage film. He concluded that it is an "interesting addition to the vampire genre that has more in common with a film like Morbid Colors than with more traditional bloodsucker films." Bryan Staebell of Scare Value appreciated that the film was not aimed at a streamer audience despite featuring a streamer as the main character, the streaming narrative instead serves the plot and visuals. He added that the film's low budget did not hold it back, as it is "full of ideas" and "thoughtfully constructed". His one criticism is that it does not make sense with the found footage format that the film has a score of non-diegetic music.

== See also ==
- List of vampire films
- List of horror films of 2024
