= The Horror Crowd =

- Directed by: Ruben Pla
- Produced by: Shaked Berenson; Arielle Brachfeld; Hank Braxtan; Jeanmarie Pla; Ruben Pla
- Cinematography: Drew Adams
- Edited by: Ruben Pla
- Music by: Chris Lott
- Release date: August 29, 2020 (FrightFest)
- Running time: 92 minutes
- Country: United States
- Language: English

The Horror Crowd is a 2020 documentary film by Ruben Pla that examines the horror community in Hollywood.

== Synopsis ==
In the film Pla examines the horror community in Hollywood, interviewing subjects such as Lin Shaye, Darren Lynn Bousman, and Chelsea Stardust. Among his questions are ones that focus on the subjects' reasons for liking and acting in horror, as well as about their key moments with the genre.

== Production ==
Pla began work on the basis of The Horror Crowd while he was in Hollywood, as he would spend time around those who were interested and working in the field of horror cinema. He decided to interview them and Hank Braxtan, one of the film's co-producers, suggested filming the meetings professionally. Pla defined the term "Horror Crowd" to include "filmmakers, directors, writers, producers, actors and the like" and during interviews, found that many discussed horror in relation to their parents. Because of this, Pla devoted one section of the film to covering the impact of parents on his interview subjects. Of his reasons to create the documentary, one was that he wanted to show that "horror filmmakers aren’t all freaks and weirdos. They have families and friends and enjoy normal things like everyone else."

== Release ==
The Horror Crowd had its world premiere on August 29, 2020, at one of the two digital versions of the film festival FrightFest.

== Reception ==
Critical reception has been mixed. Starburst and Kim Newman wrote favorable reviews, the former of which wrote that "The Horror Crowd is an enjoyable, well put together documentary that makes for an easy watch. It might not to teach you how to make it in the industry, but it will hopefully make you feel that you're not alone if you try." Nerdly rated the movie at 3.5/5, stating that it "isn’t necessarily one of those life-altering or massively inspiring documentary films, the kind that make you want to hop off the couch and go and do something huge with your next few hours, but… it’s certainly packed with intriguing anecdotes and enjoyable chats about the scene we love so much." Flickering Myth criticized The Horror Crowd for its uneven pace, writing "Fitfully interesting though shapeless and technically slapdash, only the most ardent genre enthusiasts need apply."
