= London Horror Comic =

London Horror Comic is a British horror comic book anthology. The book is written and published by John-Paul Kamath who founded London Horror Comic Ltd. The London Horror Comic was featured on BBC Radio 4 as part of a documentary about The Gorbals Vampire and interviewed about the history of horror comics.

== Publication history ==
London Horror Comic began as a monthly webcomic in 2006 featuring a series of black and white silent comic strips. These were drawn by artists Cretien Hughes and Lee Ferguson and written by John-Paul Kamath. Prior to starting London Horror Comic, Kamath had been a writer on the US horror title Trailer Park of Terror for six years by Imperium Comics. The comic was later turned into a feature film of the same name.

In August 2006, the London Horror Comic published its first full colour print story as an original comic strip called "Intermission" as a part of the programme guide to the Zone Horror Frightfest Film Festival 2006.

In 2008, London Horror Comic Ltd published the first in a series of full colour print issues with the release of London Horror Comic No. 1. Kamath said some of his main influences behind London Horror Comic were comics like Creepy and Eerie much more so than Tales from the Crypt.

London Horror Comic No. 1 was written by John-Paul Kamath and illustrated by Lee Ferguson (pencils), Marc Deering (inks), Matty Ryan (lettering and design) and Hi-Fi Design (colours) who would become the book's regular team.

== Reception ==
London Horror Comic No. 1 drew praise for its mix of horror and humour. "Laugh out loud funny, like a horror Curb Your Enthusiasm. Kamath shows serious talent," said SFX magazine No. 165.

London Horror Comic No. 2 was published in April 2009 and continued to garner praise. The Girls Entertainment Network said issue had "...dialogue lines you’ll be quoting for days, ironic and cliche-breaking twists that make each story a page-turner, and a perfect balance of humor to top it all off." An advance review by Zone Horror Television in the UK said "London Horror Comic Issue 2 is surely one of the finest anthology collections around."

London Horror Comic No. 3 was printed and made available to buy on-line only from the London Horror Comic website as a 40-page extended issue. Garth Ennis said "Good stuff here from major new talent John-Paul Kamath – far too good, in fact, Enjoy London Horror Comic while you can, because I’m going to have him killed."
