= Nailbiter =

- Directed by: Patrick Rea
- Written by: Patrick Rea; Kendal Sinn
- Starring: Emily Boresow; Erin McGrane; Meg Saricks
- Cinematography: Hanuman Brown-Eagle
- Edited by: Josh Robison
- Music by: Julian Bickford
- Production companies: Ministry Machine Productions; SenoReality Pictures
- Distributed by: Lionsgate
- Release date: January 25, 2013 (Japan)
- Running time: 82 minutes
- Country: United States
- Language: English
- Budget: $300,000

Nailbiter is a 2013 horror film directed by Patrick Rea. The movie was first released onto DVD in Japan on January 25, 2013 and received its American debut on April 5, 2013 at the Phoenix Film Festival. It stars Erin McGrane as a mother who defends herself and her children against a dangerous foe. Rea intends to film a sequel to the film, which is tentatively titled Nailbiter: The Storm Children and will feature Meg Saricks reprising her role as Jennifer.

== Plot ==
Janet and her children Sally, Jennifer, and Alice are on the way to the airport to pick up their military father when they are forced to take shelter from a tornado that is ravaging the area. They manage to find a storm cellar outside of a seemingly abandoned house, however once the storm stops they discover that a fallen tree is preventing them from leaving. Sally decides to try escaping from a window, only to get bitten by something outside of the cellar and fall into temporary unconsciousness. Attempts by Jennifer to message her father for help are unsuccessful.

Their car is noticed by the local deputy Carr, who begins to search for the family. He asks a neighbor, Mrs. Shurman, only for her to claim ignorance of the Maguires. Carr continues to look and finds the family, but is killed in the process by an unseen monster. Frantic, the family searches the cellar for any chance of escape and in turn finds a diary that reveals that the Shurman family will give birth to monsters whenever they go into labor during a storm.

They manage to also find a hidden tunnel leading to a moonshine distillery. Janet and Jennifer investigate the distillery and take a propane tank. While they are gone, a monster invades the cellar and takes Alice away. Janet manages to open the door using the propane tank as a bomb, but dies in the process. Sally and Jennifer escape the cellar but make it to a neighboring home, only to find that they are monsters similar to the Shurmans. Sally is attacked by the family, leaving only Jennifer to escape. She is soon surrounded by a large group of people, all of whom are monsters that begin to transform as a storm approaches. Jennifer is then attacked. The following morning there is no trace of Jennifer except the series of text messages that she had sent to her father throughout the film.

== Cast ==
- Erin McGrane as Janet Maguire
- Meg Saricks as Jennifer Maguire
- Emily Boresow as Alice Maguire
- Sally Spurgeon as Sally Maguire
- Joicie Appell as Mrs. Shurman
- Mark Ridgway as Sheriff
- Ben Jeffrey as Deputy Carr
- Michelle Davidson as Dina
- Allen Lowman as Tom
- Ian Dempsey as Sean
- Aaron Laue as Lt. Maguire
- Zane Martin as Little monster
- John D. Barnes as Townsperson
- Jason Coffman as Creature
- Tom Conroy as Bartender
- Anita Cordell as Traveler at airport

== Production ==
Director Patrick Rea first announced plans for Nailbiter in 2008, but production did not begin until the following year, as he needed to secure funding for the project.

Principal photography began in 2009 in Kansas City, Missouri, but production was suspended after approximately two-thirds of the film had been shot due to budget constraints. Filming resumed in December 2010, with an additional airport sequence completed in May 2011, after which the project entered full post-production.

While developing the script, Rea decided to focus primarily on female characters, explaining that he "felt like that would be more endearing as well as more compelling". Prior to filming, he asked the four lead actors to spend time together "acting like a family" to strengthen their on-screen chemistry.

Weather conditions also posed difficulties for the production, as the team frequently encountered the opposite of the desired setting—“the days [Rea] wanted to look stormy were sunny, and the days [he] wanted to look sunny looked stormy.”

== Reception ==
Critical reception for Nailbiter has been mixed to positive. A reviewer for Star Pulse commented that "As far as sheer creep factor, "Nailbiter" delivers handsomely" but criticized the DVD's lack of a "making of" documentary. The Oklahoma Gazette praised the film's setting, as they felt that this was "intriguing" and also commented favorably on the choice of making Erin McGrane's character an alcoholic. Ain't It Cool News also cited McGrane's character's alcoholism as a highlight, as they saw this as one of several small touches that they enjoyed. Dread Central remarked that the film was "not a perfect flick", as they felt that McGrane took too long to settle into her character but overall saw the movie as "ingenious, creepy and a delightful modern take on an old-school sense of storytelling".

=== Awards ===
- Best Director at Fright Night Film Fest (2013, won)
- Best Horror Feature at Shriekfest (2013, won)
