= Playhouse (film) =

2020 British horror-thriller film

- Directed by: Fionn Watts; Toby Watts
- Written by: Fionn Watts; Toby Watts
- Produced by: Fionn Watts; Toby Watts
- Starring: Rebecca Calienda; Grace Courtney; Mathilde Darmady; Julie Higginson; William Holstead; Helen Mackay; Eilidh McLaughlin; James Rottger
- Cinematography: Andy Toovey
- Edited by: Jim Page
- Music by: Dan Baboulene
- Production company: Far North Film
- Distributed by: Devilworks
- Release dates: 28 August 2020 (FrightNight); 17 November 2020 (VOD)
- Running time: 87 minutes
- Country: United Kingdom
- Language: English

Playhouse is a 2020 British horror-thriller film written and directed by Fionn and Toby Watts. The film stars Rebecca Calienda, Grace Courtney, Mathilde Darmady, Julie Higginson, William Holstead, Helen Mackay, Eilidh McLaughlin, and James Rottger.

It premiered at the 2020 London FrightFest Film Festival and was released online on 17 November 2020.

== Premise ==
In a remote Scottish castle, an irreverent writer faces terrifying consequences when his daughter falls prey to an evil curse lurking within the walls.

== Cast ==
- Rebecca Calienda as Kathryn
- Grace Courtney as Bee Travis
- Mathilde Darmady as Katie
- Julie Higginson as Samantha
- William Holstead as Jack Travis
- Helen Mackay as Jenny Andrews
- Eilidh McLaughlin as Alex
- James Rottger as Callum Andrews

== Release ==
The film premiered on 28 August 2020 at FrightFest and was released to video on-demand platforms on 17 November 2020.

== Reception ==
On review aggregator website Rotten Tomatoes, the film holds an approval rating of 67% based on nine critic reviews, with an average rating of 5.8/10. Paul Grammatico of Dread Central scored the film 3.5/5 and said "If you are looking for a good throwback to a grand old gothic good time, Playhouse will be a dreadful delight." Film Threat's Andrew Stover gave the film 7/10, and said "Although Playhouse isn't as emotionally critical or tightly written as it should be, The Watts brothers are skilled in nurturing a dour atmosphere and exposing a darker side to the creative impulse."
