= Greywood's Plot =

- Directed by: Josh Stifter
- Written by: Josh Stifter; Daniel Degnan
- Produced by: Jason Scott Goldberg; Josh Stifter; Brandon Waites
- Starring: Josh Stifter; Keith Radichel; Daniel Degnan
- Cinematography: Daniel Lynn
- Edited by: Josh Stifter
- Music by: Curtis Allen Hager
- Production company: Flush Studios
- Distributed by: Terror Films
- Release dates: 18 October 2019 (Twin Citites Film Fest); 16 September 2022 (digital)
- Running time: 78 minutes
- Country: United States
- Language: English

Greywood's Plot is a 2019 American horror film directed by Josh Stifter, starring Josh Stifter, Keith Radichel and Daniel Degnan.

== Cast ==
- Josh Stifter as Dom
- Keith Radichel as Miles
- Daniel Degnan as Doug Greywood
- Nathan Strauss as Igor
- Kim Fagan as Dom's Mom
- Samantha Kirchoff as Marla
- Aaron McKenna as Aaron

== Release ==
The film was released on digital on 16 September 2022.

== Reception ==
Martin Unsworth of Starburst rated the film 4 stars out of 5 and wrote that while the film is not "wholly successful", it is " entertaining", is "clearly a labour of love" and has a "brilliant" twist.

John Noonan of FilmInk wrote that while the film "could do with a trim", it is " disarmingly interesting" and "will please those looking for something a bit different."

Film critic Kim Newman wrote that the film has "a small cast, imaginative use of woodland locations, an odd attitude and an unusual use of handcrafted animated inserts to add texture and strangeness."
