= The Demon's Rook =

- Directed by: James Sizemore
- Written by: James Sizemore, Akom Tidwell
- Starring: Ashleigh Jo Sizemore, James Sizemore, John Chatham
- Cinematography: Tim Reis
- Edited by: Tim Reis
- Production company: Black Rider Productions
- Release date: July 27, 2013 (Fantasia Film Festival))
- Running time: 103 minutes
- Country: United States
- Language: English

The Demon's Rook is a 2013 independent fantasy-horror film and the directorial debut of James Sizemore (who is also known under the pseudonym of Loup'Rah Garomore). The film had its world premiere on July 27, 2013 at the Fantasia Film Festival and stars Sizemore as Roscoe, a young man that must find a way to stop demons from overtaking the world. Funding for The Demon's Rook was partially received through crowdsourcing websites Kickstarter and Indiegogo.

== Synopsis ==
Young boy Roscoe (Emmett Eckert) is lured into a portal to Hell by the elder demon Dimwos (John Chatham), who raises him into manhood and teaches him dark magic as he does. As an adult, Roscoe (James Sizemore) mistakenly releases three demons Dimwos had been tasked with keeping imprisoned, and flees back to Earth, followed by the demons. Roscoe reconnects with childhood friend Eva (Ashleigh Jo Sizemore), who has grown into a beautiful woman. Roscoe and Eva must track down the three demons and stop them from unleashing chaos, violence, and Hell on Earth.

== Cast ==
- Ashleigh Jo Sizemore as Eva
- James Sizemore as Roscoe
- Emmett Eckert as Little Roscoe
- John Chatham as Dimwos
- Melanie Richardson as Barbara
- Josh Adam Gould as Owrefewl / Ogrom / Zombie / Barbara's Admirer
- Sade Smith as Valurga
- Dustin Dorough as Rolmortus
- Grace Kilgore as Little Eva

== Reception ==
Critical reception for The Demon's Rook has been largely positive and the movie has received praise from Ain't It Cool News and Fearnet. Much of the praise centered upon its special effects, and Bloody Disgusting commented that they found the gore "impressive". Fangoria gave the movie three out of four skulls and stated that although the movie had some rough spots to it, its "heart and earnest spirit override any limitation."

=== Awards ===
- Best Special Effects Award at Fantaspoa (2014, won)
