= Where the Devil Roams =

- Release poster
- Directed by: John Adams; Zelda Adams; Toby Poser
- Written by: John Adams; Zelda Adams; Toby Poser
- Produced by: Toby Poser
- Starring: Toby Poser; Zelda Adams; John Adams
- Music by: John Adams
- Production company: Wonder Wheel Productions
- Distributed by: Tubi TV
- Release date: July 27, 2023 (Fantasia Film Festival)
- Running time: 93 minutes
- Country: United States
- Language: English

Where the Devil Roams is a 2023 horror film directed by John Adams, Zelda Adams, and Toby Poser.

== Plot ==
A family of murderous sideshow performers travels round the world on the dying carnival circuit.

== Cast ==
- John Adams as Seven
- Toby Poser as Maggie
- Zelda Adams as Eve
- Sam Rodd
- Harald Sørlie
- Lulu Adams
- Nathaniel Meek

== Reception ==
The film has a 100% "Fresh" rating on Rotten Tomatoes based on 41 reviews.
