= Aquaslash =

Canadian slasher film

- Theatrical release poster
- Directed by: Renaud Gauthier
- Written by: Renaud Gauthier; Philip Kalin
- Produced by: Pierre-Alexandre Bouchard
- Starring: Nicolas Fontaine; Brittany Drisdelle; Madelline Harvey; Lanisa Dawn; Paul Zinno; Nick Walker; Chip Chuipka
- Cinematography: Derek Branscombe
- Music by: Bruce Cameron
- Distributed by: Red Hound Films
- Release date: 29 July 2019 (Fantasia Film Festival)
- Running time: 71 minutes
- Country: Canada
- Language: English

Aquaslash is a 2019 Canadian slasher film directed by Renaud Gauthier, who also co-wrote it with Philip Kalin. It stars Nicolas Fontaine, Brittany Drisdelle, Madelline Harvey, Lanisa Dawn, Paul Zinno, Nick Walker, and Chip Chuipka. It is set at a water park, where a killer targets a group of recent high school graduates who are in competition for a cash prize for the fastest team to slide down the park's water slides. Critical reception for Aquaslash was predominantly negative.

== Plot ==
One night at the Wet Valley Water Park, two teenagers are killed by a machete-wielding assailant.

Some time later, the 2018 graduating class of Valley Hills High visits the water park, owned and supervised by Paul Wilkinson, for a weekend-long celebration of their graduation. Among those present are Josh, a member of a band called the Blades; Josh's bandmates Chad and Slim; Priscilla, Paul's wife; Alice, a graduate with whom Paul is cheating on Priscilla; Tommy, one of the park's employees; Conrad, an elderly pool cleaner; and Kimberly, who is Tommy's girlfriend and Josh's ex-girlfriend. Rumours circulate amongst the students about Priscilla supposedly choosing one graduate to have sex with each year.

Two drunk graduates go down one of the park's water slides, and are injured when one impacts with a glass bottle held by the other. They leave in an ambulance, and Paul orders Conrad to clean the pool without draining it. That night, Priscilla joins Josh's father, a real estate developer named Michael, in a restaurant for dinner. Josh and Kimberly have sex in the showers, and are secretly recorded on video by another graduate named Phil. Later, the Blades perform a song in the park. During their performance, the video of Josh and Kimberly having sex is sent to the other graduates, including Tommy, who punches Josh and is fired from the park.

Shortly thereafter, Michael tells Josh that he is negotiating ownership of the park with Paul. Elsewhere, an unseen individual installs a pair of large, metal blades, arranged in an "X" shape, in one of the park's water slides. The next day, Michael is fatally shot by an unseen attacker, and a boy uncovers a portable music player in a sandy area of the park. Later that day, an annual competition begins: teams of three members are to race down one of three slides, and whichever team reaches the pool below fastest wins a cash prize. Tommy worries that one of the slides will collapse, but his concerns are ignored.

The first set of teams each go down one of the slides. Alice and two other graduates go down the slide containing the blades and are cut to pieces. Tommy, while attempting to warn his fellow graduates not to go down the slides, is pushed down the weaponised slide; he becomes stuck against the blades and the bodies caught therein. The pool below begins to fill with blood and limbs from the weaponised slide, causing spectators to panic. Paul and Priscilla, unaware of the danger, continue to send teams down the slides, and eventually decide to slide down themselves. Josh unsuccessfully attempts to save Paul from sliding into the blades. Josh and Conrad both climb to the top of the slide to try to prevent other people from sliding down the slide but are pushed down the slide themselves.

Following the massacre, a surviving Josh meets with a lawyer, who informs Josh that Michael left him his estate, and has him authorise the replacement of the Wet Valley Water Park with a shopping complex. It is then revealed that the individual who installed the blades in the slide and killed Michael was Priscilla, who, 35 years earlier, witnessed her father die in the water park, and no one bothered to help him. In a mid-credits scene, the boy with the portable music player surfaces in the bloody pool.

== Cast ==
- Nicolas Fontaine as Josh
- Brittany Drisdelle as Priscilla
- Nick Walker as Paul
- Madelline Harvey as Alice
- Paul Zinno as Tommy
- Chip Chuipka as Conrad
- HoJo Rose as Michael Randall
- Ryan Ali as Slim
- Cameron Geller as Chad
- Lanisa Dawn as Kimberley
- Ivan D. Ossa as Big Phil
- Samantha Hodhod as Cindy
- Jeremy Lavigne as Brad
- Suzanna Lenir as Mrs. Danforth
- Owen Bruemmer as Jimmy
- Xavier Sotelo as Lawyer

== Production and release ==
Aquaslash was filmed at the Super Aqua Club water park in Pointe-Calumet, Quebec, Canada.

Aquaslash had its world premiere at the 2019 Fantasia Film Festival on July 29, 2019. It was distributed by Red Hound Films and released at drive-in theatres and on video on demand on June 23, 2020.

== Reception ==
Reception for Aquaslash was predominantly negative. On the review aggregator website Rotten Tomatoes, 14% of seven critics' reviews are positive.

Cody Hamman of Arrow in the Head gave Aquaslash a score of seven out of ten, writing: "Once people start going down the slide those blades are in, Aquaslash delivers a sequence of bloodshed and insanity that lasts for several minutes, and that sequence earns the movie a recommendation." Dread Central's Josh Millican called it an "irreverent, retro slasher throwback from Canada. Unique in its build towards a singularly shocking sequence, Aquaslash is way more exciting than your typical trip to the water park".

Rob Hunter of Film School Rejects gave Aquaslash a negative review, criticising its story and characters and calling it "a barely watchable misfire [...] but it still finds some unintentional laughs in its serious nonsense."
