= Dead Meat (film) =

- DVD cover
- Directed by: Conor McMahon
- Written by: Conor McMahon
- Produced by: Michael Griffin; Edward King
- Starring: Marian Araujo; David Muyllaert
- Cinematography: Andrew Legge
- Edited by: Conor McMahon
- Music by: John Gillooley
- Distributed by: Three Way Distributors
- Release dates: October 2004 (US); December 2004 (Ireland)
- Running time: 80 minutes
- Country: Ireland
- Language: English
- Budget: €110,000

Dead Meat is a 2004 Irish zombie film written and directed by Conor McMahon, starring Spanish theatre actress Marian Araujo and veteran Irish actor Eoin Whelan.

== Plot summary ==
An outbreak of a mutant strain of mad cow disease infects the Irish countryside, turning people into ravenous, flesh-eating zombies. Caught amid this chaos are a young Spanish tourist and the local gravedigger. Together, this unlikely duo must fight for survival.

== Cast ==
- Marian Araujo as Helena
- David Muyllaert as Desmond
- Eoin Whelan as Cathal Cheutan
- David Ryan as Martin
- Amy Redmond as Francie
- Kathryn Toolan as Lisa

Dan Ewing, of Australian soap opera Home and Away had an extra role as a castle zombie.

== Production ==
Dead Meat was filmed in and around the village of Leitrim, County Leitrim, Ireland. Dead Meat was also the first Irish horror to feature a 100% Irish crew.

== Release ==
According to the "making of..." featurette included in the US DVD release, the film was greenlighted under a new funding scheme from the Irish Film Board called "Microbudget Films", targeted at frugal independent filmmakers. Dead Meat was the first microbudget film to receive a release. To cut costs, the crew used many donated sets, filmmakers' personal vehicles and recruited volunteer extras at the local pub. Dead Meat received video distribution by Revolver Entertainment in the UK and Fangoria Entertainment in the US.

== Soundtrack ==
David Muyllaert, who played heroic gravedigger Desmond in Dead Meat, also sang lead on the film's title song, the punk-metal-ish "Dead Meat".

The score was composed by John Gillooley.

== Reception ==
Dennis Harvey of Variety wrote, "A rural Irish setting and mad cow disease plot hook do surprisingly little to distinguish fast-moving but routine zombie flick". Beyond Hollywood called it "one of the best zombie movies, regardless of budget, to come out in recent years". Writing in The Zombie Movie Encyclopedia: Volume 2, academic Peter Dendle said, "A few unexpected twists and a lot gorgeous scenery distinguish this otherwise straightforward B-zed flick from Ireland."
