= Last Girl Standing =

- Directed by: Benjamin R. Moody
- Written by: Benjamin R. Moody
- Starring: Akasha Villalobos; Danielle Evon Ploeger; Brian Villalobos
- Production company: Blue Goggles Films
- Release date: 2015
- Running time: 91 minutes
- Country: United States

Last Girl Standing is a 2015 American psychological horror film written and directed by Benjamin R. Moody. It stars Akasha Villalobos, Danielle Evon Ploeger, and Brian Villalobos.

== Plot ==
Camryn survives an attack from a homicidal killer wearing a deer mask, later dubbed The Hunter, which claims the lives of her friends. Four years later, she is suffering from post-traumatic stress disorder, and trying to live a quiet life – working in a laundromat, and avoiding contact with other people. That changes when Nick starts a job at the laundromat, and Camryn begins to believe that someone is stalking her again. She decides to keep an eye on Nick and his friends to make sure that history won't repeat itself.

== Cast ==
- Akasha Villalobos as Camryn
- Danielle Evon Ploeger as Danielle
- Brian Villalobos as Nick
- JD Carrera as Tyler
- Ryan Hamilton as Griffin
- Kelsey Pribilski as Maelyn
- Laura Ray as Hannah
- Jason Vines as The Hunter

== Production ==
Last Girl Standing was produced in Austin, Texas, and was funded via Kickstarter. It was written and directed by Benjamin R. Moody, and produced by his wife Rachel Moody.

== Release ==
The film screened its world premiere at Film4 FrightFest in the United Kingdom on August 31, 2015. Its American premiere was on October 17, 2015 at the Eerie Horror Fest.

== Reception ==
Last Girl Standing received mixed to positive reviews from critics. Dread Central enthusiastically declares, "Every year at Texas Frightmare Weekend there’s one movie that screens that stands above the others... In 2016 that movie is Last Girl Standing." Horrornews.net raves that the film "...was a great watch, and it comes highly recommended." Bloody Disgusting's review was more mixed, noting that "A lot of Last Girl Standing works, but it feels like it’s all setup and once it finally does reveal its true nature, it ends." Similarly, Scream Magazine remarks, "This may have a great concept and a realistic execution, but there is a certain amount of entertainment value missing", adding "Last Girl Standing is definitely worth a watch..." Horror Freak News was negative in it assessment of the film, winding up in its review with "it's a foregone conclusion that it can be labeled "adequately skip-worthy"."
