= Sienna Shaw =

Character in the Terrifier film series

- Terrifier character
- Lauren LaVera as Sienna in Terrifier 2
- First appearance: Terrifier 2 (2022)
- Created by: Damien Leone
- Portrayed by: Lauren LaVera; Luciana Elisa Quiñonez (young)

In-universe information
- Occupation: High-school student (former)
- Relatives: Michael Shaw (father, deceased); Barbara Shaw (mother, deceased); Jonathan Shaw (younger brother, supposedly deceased); Jess (maternal aunt, deceased); Greg (maternal uncle, deceased); Gabbie (maternal cousin, missing)
- Status: Alive

Sienna Shaw is a fictional character and the main protagonist of the Terrifier franchise. Sienna first appears in Terrifier 2 (2022) as a teenager interested in cosplay who battles the enigmatic villain Art the Clown. She is portrayed by Lauren LaVera, who reprises the role in subsequent installments. Sienna's creator, Damien Leone, invested a lot of time into fully developing her as a character as he regretted leaving the first film's heroine Victoria Heyes underdeveloped. The character originates from an abandoned film Leone was developing in the late 2000s, featuring the concept of a Valkyrie-angel warrior attired heroine battling Art.

LaVera was the only person Leone considered for the role. LaVera spent months questioning Leone for preparation and developed a full binder of notes about Sienna—asking him who inspired the character and having him create a playlist that he believed Sienna would listen to. Leone states that LaVera is the first actor to show immense care and interest for a character he wrote, helping him further develop her. Leone describes Sienna as his favorite character that he has ever created.

The character's Halloween costume drew a significantly favorable reaction from fans—LaVera, however, was not fond of the attire as it was uncomfortable for her to wear. The outfit was not complete by the time filming began, and it did not have lining; LaVera had to wear duct tape to hold the attire together throughout the shoot and even developed blisters. Sienna was well-received by critics and audiences, with much of the acclaim going toward her characterization and LaVera's portrayal. Sienna has been referred to as LaVera's breakthrough role and a contemporary example of the "final girl" trope.

== Appearances ==
=== Films ===
The character made her cinematic debut in Terrifier 2 in 2022. In this film, Sienna (Lauren LaVera) is a teenage girl living with her widowed mother, Barbara and her younger brother, Jonathan following the death of their father, Michael. She has been developing cosplay for an angel-warrior character that her father created for her before his death, which included a sword he left to her. Jonathan believes their father envisioned Sienna as the only person capable of defeating Art the Clown. Sienna begins having bizarre encounters with Art—both in her dreams and in real life. After engaging in a battle with Art to defend her brother, Art kills her with her father's sword before it resurrects her, and she decapitates him.

The character returns in Terrifier 3 (2024). In this film, set five years after Terrifier 2, Sienna is released from a psychiatric hospital to live with Barbara's older sister, Jessica, her husband, Greg, and their daughter, Gabbie. She has become estranged from Jonathan as they are handling their trauma differently. Additionally, she is suffering from survivor guilt, frequently seeing hallucinations of her dead friend Brooke. Art and a possessed Victoria Heyes kill her remaining family, excluding Gabbie. After obtaining her sword, Sienna slices Art's throat and decapitates Victoria, whose blood opens a portal to Hell. Gabbie falls into the portal, and Sienna vows to save her. It is also shown that, like Art, Sienna has supernatural healing capabilities.

=== Video games ===
Sienna made her first video game appearance in the 2025 beat 'em up game Terrifier: The ARTcade Game.

Sienna will be added as a downloadable playable survivor in the online asymmetrical survival horror game Dead by Daylight on November 24, 2026, alongside Art the Clown as a downloadable playable killer.

== Development ==
The conception of Sienna Shaw dates back to 2008—with Leone envisioning an angel-warrior-attired heroine to battle Art the Clown for a feature-length follow-up to his 2008 directorial debut short film The 9th Circle. The project got scrapped, and Leone abandoned the Sienna character concept.

Following widespread criticism for Terrifier's (2016) underdeveloped protagonists, Leone wanted to bring back Sienna as the heroine of Terrifier 2. Leone spent three consecutive months in 2017 writing a screenplay with much of his focus on developing Sienna. He has stated that he based much of Sienna's characteristics on his two older sisters and that the character was very personal to him. Leone wrote the character with mythic religious undertones, envisioning her as a teenage girl slowly transforming into the embodiment of an Old Testament angel that is the equivalent to Art's representation of a resurrected demon.

LaVera was ultimately cast; she said that Leone and actor David Howard Thornton described the dynamic between Art and Sienna as something inspired by the relationship between superhero Batman and supervillain Joker of DC Comics during a lunch shortly after her casting. Leone stated that out of all the actors he has worked with, LaVera showed the most interest and care for one of his characters—consistently questioning him about his intentions for Sienna and even journaling for the part to understand who she believed Sienna to be. LaVera had Leone create a playlist for her that he envisioned the character listening to. LaVera describes Sienna as reflecting Leone in personality.

=== Valkyrie costume ===
Costume designer Olga Turka created the angel-warrior Valkyrie costume that Sienna spends the first portion of the film building. The attire helped LaVera develop her physicality for her performance, describing it as contributing to her embodying the confidence it brings to Sienna—LaVera consciously portrayed Sienna as timid and hunched over but more confident and standing straighter up by the end of the film.

The attire was well received by audiences. LaVera began messages from fans who made their own versions of it, in some cases for a drag interpretation of Sienna. While liking the design and wearing it at first, LaVera did not like wearing it throughout the shoot because it was incomplete before filming began and lacked lining. She had to wear duct tape to hold it together and developed blisters while wearing.

== Reception ==
Collider's Raquel Hollman described Sienna as the Wonder Woman of horror films and that she provides a "supernatural element" to the final girl trope due to her resurrection after death. Hollman contrasts her with Victoria Heyes, the sole survivor of the first film—"Director Damien Leone not only gives us a final girl gone bad in Vicky, but a final girl seemingly just as powerful as her foe in Sienna." Hollman writes that while the first film is solely Art's narrative, the second film shifts the focus to Sienna and that she is Art's equivalent in that "Art and Sienna are oppositional forces who parallel each other on a spatial and spiritual level. For all the heartlessness Art holds, Sienna is a character driven by her relationships with those around her." Writing for Fangoria, Andrew Crump writes that Sienna was the most influential heroine of 2022, writing that "When Sienna accepts her role as She Who Will Kill Art, she effectively becomes a new final girl variant. It isn't just inevitable that she and Art end Terrifier 2 together. It's destined in mythic fashion. LaVera carries that motif through with dazzling star power, ending 2022 as its greatest final girl, a serious accomplishment given that she's following up Neve Campbell and Jamie Lee Curtis. She may be the year's most influential final girl, too - the one to usher in a generation of final girls prepared to slash their slashers back."

Jeffrey Anderson of Common Sense Media describes Sienna as being a positive role model for viewers and states, "Right away, it's easy to see what a great new character Sienna is; her warrior costume is only half of it." Scott Mendelson of Forbes wrote, "Lauren LaVera makes for an agreeable and sympathetic primary target/protagonist/final girl." Writing for /Film, Matthew Bilodeau highlights LaVera's performance as bringing a sense of personality and writes that Sienna will likely become a popular character for cosplay.

Jaden Oberkrom of North Texas Daily praised LaVera, writing that her performance "immediately gets the audience invested in her character." Dakota Mayes of MovieWeb writes that "Lauren LaVera breathes life into Sienna and plays her as a final girl like no other." Writing for Comic Book Resources, writer Maddie Davis highlights the character's resurrection after death as making her notably different to prior horror heroines. Matt Donato of IGN stated, "Lauren LaVera rules as Sienna in her angel-winged fantasy armor as a final girl fighting for family, facing her demons, and screaming bloody war cries in Art's mocking face."

The character has been well-received by audiences, with LaVera recalling that she was shown the first Sienna tattoo in 2020, following the release of Terrifier 2's teaser trailer. In response to the favorable reception to her character, LaVera stated, "That's all an actor ever wants. Not so much for fans to get tattoos, even though I am honored; it's more about the fact that they feel this connection to her. They feel strength from her. They feel that they see themselves in her, and that's all an actor ever wants, to make their audience feel less alone. That's why I got into acting. I'm collecting all the pictures. I have them on my phone, all the Sienna costumes. I'm slowly compiling them, and I'll eventually make a post of them, honoring everybody that's been honoring Sienna. It's an unreal experience."
