= Art the Clown =

Fictional character in the Terrifier franchise

- Terrifier character
- David Howard Thornton as Art in Terrifier 2
- First appearance: The 9th Circle (2008)
- Created by: Damien Leone
- Portrayed by: Mike Giannelli (2008–2013); David Howard Thornton (2016–present)

In-universe information
- Alias: The Miles County Clown
- Species: Human (formerly); Undead demon
- Classification: Mass murderer
- Primary location: Miles County, New York
- Abilities: Superhuman Strength; Superhuman Durability; Murder methodology; Torture methodology; Immortality; Regeneration
- Signature weapons: Cat o' nine tails, scalpel, hacksaw, cleaver, gun, chainsaw, axe, rats, hammer, nitrogen
- Allies: Victoria Heyes (deceased)
- Status: Alive

Art the Clown is a fictional character and the main antagonist in the Terrifier film series and related media. Created by Damien Leone, the character first appeared in the short films The 9th Circle (2008) and Terrifier (2011). Both shorts were included in the anthology film All Hallows' Eve (2013), which marked the character's feature film debut. In these early appearances, he was portrayed by Mike Giannelli before his retirement from acting. He was replaced by David Howard Thornton, who portrayed Art in Terrifier (2016), Terrifier 2 (2022), and Terrifier 3 (2024).

Art debuted as a background character in Leone's directorial debut short film to test out different horror concepts. Audiences responded strongly to Art, leading Leone to develop the character into a recurring slasher villain over the next decade. Art became a pop culture figure and iconic evil clown after the critical and commercial success of Terrifier 2. The character's background remains ambiguous, although all of his appearances show him possessing supernatural abilities. His archenemy is the final girl Sienna Shaw (Lauren LaVera), with Leone writing Sienna and Art to reflect biblical undertones of good and evil.

== Concept and creation ==
Leone's idea of Art originated from his concept of a woman getting off work and taking the city bus home, where a clown gets on and sits across from her, taunting her. He envisioned Art as a combination of being uncomfortable and comedic to viewers—but with the character becoming "progressively more intimidating and aggressive." Art got incorporated into Leone's directorial debut, the short film The 9th Circle (2008), merely as a background character, as Leone states, "I threw in everything, clowns, witches, demons, monsters, everything up against the wall hoping something would stick."

Art appeared next in Leone's follow-up film, the short film Terrifier (2011), which followed Art's pursuit of a costume designer that witnessed one of his murders at a gas station; he had a more substantial role in this film after people who viewed The 9th Circle expressed interest about him to Leone. Film producer Jesse Baget, who saw the short films on YouTube, approached Leone about including them in an anthology film. Leone saw this as an opportunity to direct a feature film of Art, and he ultimately agreed. It would evolve into All Hallows' Eve (2013) and included a wraparound story of a babysitter that becomes the target of Art after one of the children she's watching receives a VHS tape depicting Art after trick-or-treating. This anthology film would further implicate Art being a supernatural entity, although his background remains ambiguous. Actor Mike Giannelli, who is a friend of Leone, portrayed Art in all of these appearances before retiring from acting.

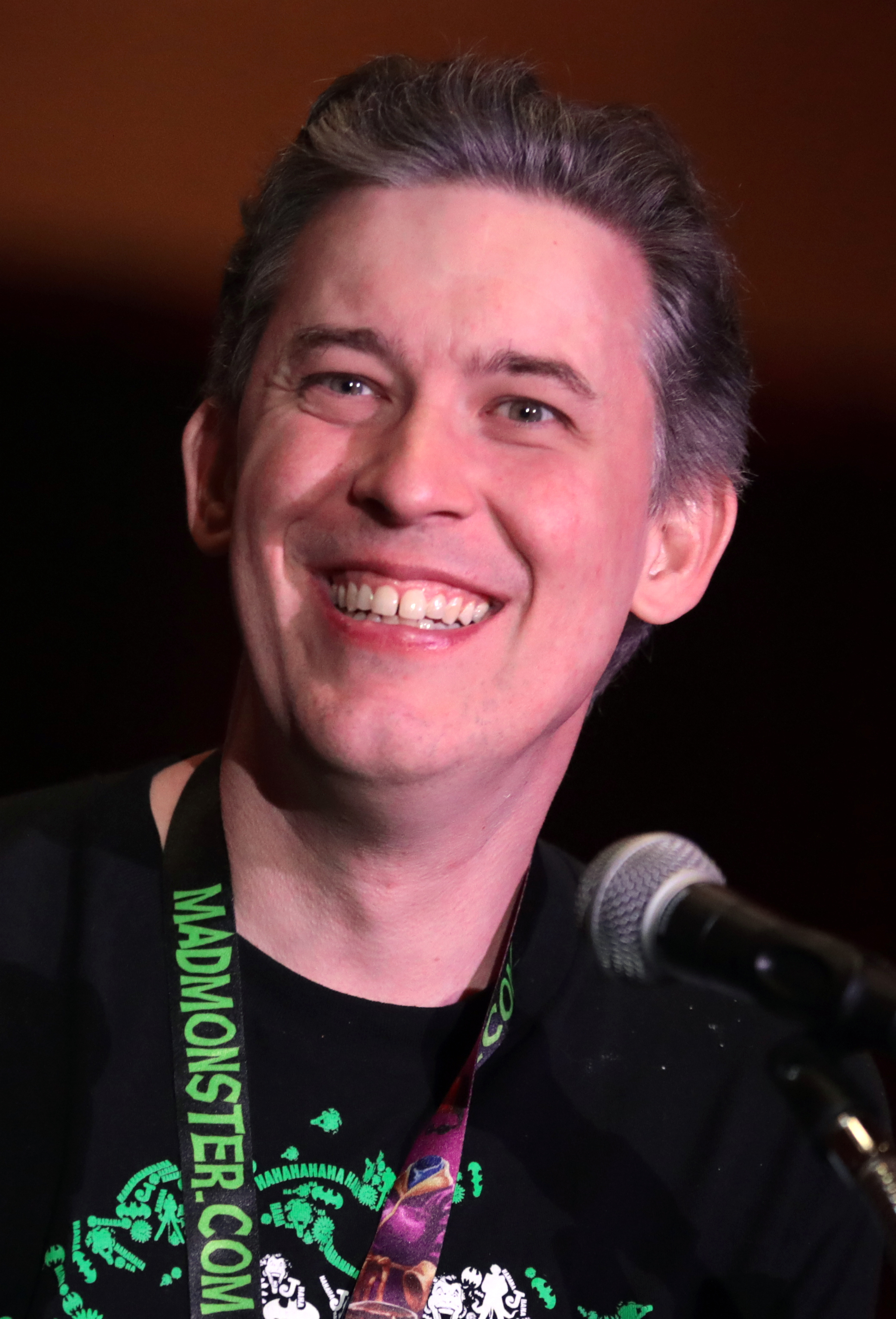
David Howard Thornton first played Art in the feature-length version of Terrifier

After the release of All Hallows' Eve, Leone wanted to create a feature-length film focusing solely on Art as he believed the 2010s lacked an iconic horror villain, particularly an original clown character. He aimed to make Art the opposite of Pennywise the Dancing Clown both in characterization and appearance; Art is bald, does not speak, uses weapons, and wears makeup and clothes devoid of color. However, in contrast to silent killers such as Leatherface, Michael Myers and Jason Voorhees, Art is highly expressive and emotional. Following Giannelli's retirement, David Howard Thornton was cast in the role. Leone describes the difference in casting as, "Mike may as well have been a guy dressed as a clown, whereas David is a clown. If you know him in person, he is a walking cartoon. He is Roger Rabbit in real life, and you'd never believe that he's Art the Clown, but he knows how to flip the switch and bring it to a dark place." Thornton saw a posting on the digital casting website Actors Access for a "tall, skinny, comedic actor that had experience in clowning and comedy". As he was familiar with Art the Clown through All Hallows' Eve, Thornton asked his agent to submit him for it; after improvising a kill scene during his audition, he got cast in the role.

== Film appearances ==
The character made his debut appearance in the short film The 9th Circle (2008), which follows his pursuit of a young woman named Casey (Kayla Lian) in an empty train station on Halloween night. Merely a supporting character in this film, Art abducts Casey, bringing her to a satanic cult for a sacrifice to Satan.

Art's second appearance occurred in the short film Terrifier (2011), where he stalks and torments a young woman who witnesses one of his murders at a gas station.

The character made his feature-film debut in All Hallows' Eve (2013) which incorporates the prior two short films as segments on VHS tapes that the film's protagonist Sarah (Katie Maguire) watches with the children she's babysitting on Halloween night. Art enters the real world and murders the children for a terrified Sarah to find.

Art's second feature-film appearance was in the slasher film Terrifier (2016). Set on Halloween night in fictitious Miles County, New York, Terrifier sees Art pursue partygoer Tara Heyes (Jenna Kanell), her younger sister Vicky (Samantha Scaffidi), and her best friend Dawn Emerson (Catherine Corcoran). After killing Tara and Dawn, Art targets Vicky, the lone survivor. She fights against Art until he runs her over with a pickup truck and eats half of her face, leaving her disfigured. Before he can kill her, the police confront him at gunpoint; he shoots himself.

In Terrifier 2 (2022), a sinister entity known as the Little Pale Girl (Amelie McLain) resurrects Art and accompanies him in his pursuit of Sienna Shaw (Lauren LaVera) and Sienna's younger brother, Jonathan (Elliot Fullam). Their father, Michael (Jason Patric), was an artist that died from a brain tumor. Having envisioned Art and his victims in his prophetic sketches, Michael drew Sienna as an angel-warrior-attired heroine fated to defeat Art; thus, before his death, Michael also gifted Sienna a sword. Sienna, who made a Halloween costume based on her father's sketches, battles Art in an abandoned carnival. Art is defeated after Sienna decapitates him with her father's sword. However, he is brought back to life after Vicky Heyes, who is in a mental hospital, gives birth to his living head as his new mother, and is possessed by the Little Pale Girl.

In Terrifier 3 (2024), Art's headless body reanimates inside the Terrifier carnival and makes its way to Miles County's psychiatric hospital, where Art reattaches his head after helping the possessed Victoria tear apart a security guard. The duo escape to an abandoned mansion, then spend the next five years in hibernation. In December 2023, they reawaken and set off on another killing spree. They track down Sienna and invade her home, killing her aunt, Jessica (Margaret Anne Florence) and her uncle Greg (Bryce Johnson) in front of her. The demonic entities add more horror when they reveal an unrecognizable skull that according to them belongs to Jonathan. Fortunately, Sienna fights against the spirit of the Little Pale Girl, preventing it from invading her body, partially because she still has her cousin Gabbie (Antonella Rose) to fight for. Through a clever strategy from Gabbie, Sienna gains control of her sword, using it to kill Victoria and presumably the Little Pale Girl inside her. Art attacks Sienna with his chainsaw but is ultimately pinned to a wall. Vicky's corpse creates a portal to Hell and Sienna sees herself forced to abandon Art to save Gabbie, only for the younger girl to fall into the mysterious realm alongside the sword. Taking advantage of Sienna's distraction, Art escapes through a window and catches a bus, where he honks his horn at a woman as she reads a book called "The 9th Circle."

Terrifier 4 is currently in the works and will feature Art's backstory within the first 15 minutes of the film according to Leone.

== In other media ==
=== Film ===
Art is parodied in Scary Movie (2026), depicting the scene from Terrifier 3 where the character poses as a mall Santa and hands out severed body parts to children.

=== Television ===
David Howard Thornton reprised the role of Art the Clown in the 2023 comedy series Bupkis in the episode, "Show Me the Way".

In December 2024, it was announced that David Howard Thornton would appear as Art the Clown in A Very Special Terrifier Christmas yule log, which was released on December 24, 2024.

=== Literature ===
Art the Clown is featured as the main antagonist in a comic book adaptation of Terrifier that retold the story over three issues between 2021 and 2022, and novelizations of Terrifier 2 and Terrifier 3 which were released in 2024 and 2025 perspectively.

=== Video Games ===
Art made his first video game appearance in the Call of Duty franchise with Call of Duty: Warzone and Call of Duty: Modern Warfare III in an annual event called "The Haunting" starting on September 18, 2024. Art then appeared as a playable character in the 2025 video game Terrifier: The ARTcade Game, the first video game based on the Terrifier franchise. Art also appeared as an unlockable skin in Fortnite during the 2025 halloween event Fortnitemares and will be added as a downloadable playable killer in the online asymmetrical survival horror game Dead by Daylight on November 24, 2026, alongside Sienna Shaw as a downloadable playable survivor.

=== Music ===
American rapper and singer Ghostemane cited the character as influence for his 2020 studio album Anti-Icon.

Ice Nine Kills released a music video of their song A Work of Art based on the Terrifier franchise in 2024, with David Howard Thornton portraying Art murdering several concertgoers. The song was also featured in Terrifier 3.

=== Merchandise ===
In 2018, apparel company Terror Threads released a Christmas jumper depicting the character.

== Reception ==
In a positive review for the magazine Starburst, Sol Harris wrote "Art is a truly enigmatic and memorable villain. He frequently veers into the territory of being genuinely unpleasant to watch, which makes him feel somewhat separate from the stable of horror icons such as Freddy Krueger and Chucky. Special acknowledgement should be given to David Howard Thornton for a truly wonderful performance and one that easily stands toe-to-toe with the likes of Curry and Skarsgård." In a more middling review, the blog Film School Rejects praised Thornton's portrayal and use of body language but panned Terrifier and deemed the character a misogynist with "a deep hatred for women".
