= Samantha Scaffidi =

American actress (born 1989)

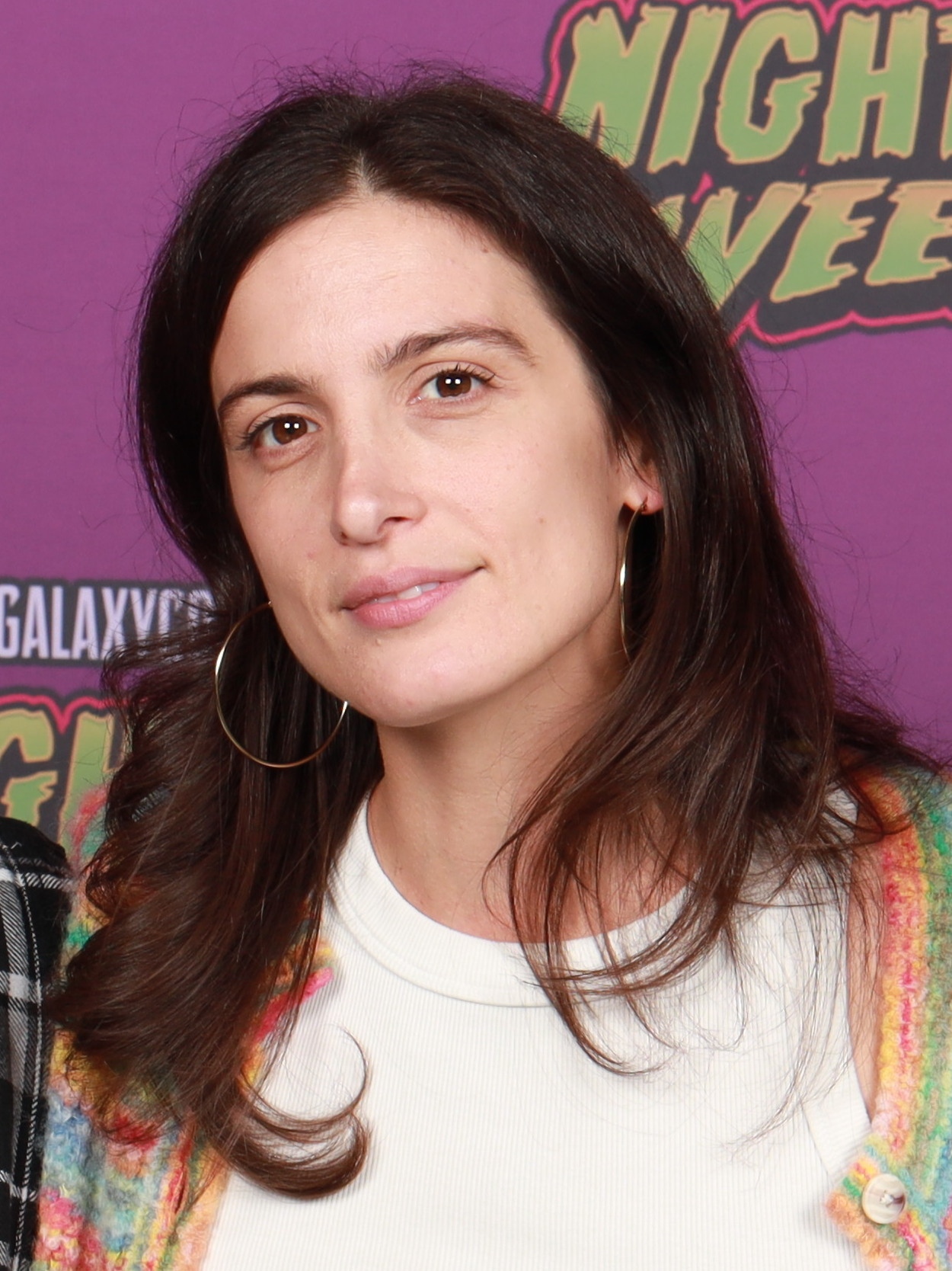
- Scaffidi in 2025
- Born: March 3, 1989 (age 37)
- Education: Salve Regina University; William Esper Studio
- Occupations: Actress; director; producer
- Years active: 2012–present

Samantha Scaffidi (born March 3, 1989) is an American actress, writer, and director. She began her career in short films before becoming known for her role as Victoria Heyes in the Terrifier film franchise—appearing in Terrifier (2016), Terrifier 2 (2022) and Terrifier 3 (2024). She had a leading role as Luce in Demon Hole (2017). In addition to acting, Scaffidi is known for directing the RAINN public service announcement Wait (2019).

== Early life ==
Scaffidi studied acting and voice at Salve Regina University and a variety of acting-related topics at the William Esper Studio.

== Career ==
=== Independent films ===
Scaffidi began her career with a minor role as a waitress in the short film Uncomfortable Silence and Bea in Derailing (both in 2013). In 2015, she portrayed Georgette in the feature film Sam and Samantha in the short film Act, Naturally. The same year, Scaffidi had a supporting role as Michelle in the independent comedy film The Networker. The following year, she portrayed the lead character Luce in the comedy horror film Demon Hole which premiered at the Cannes Film Festival and was picked up by SC Films and SP Releasing. In 2018, Scaffidi had a supporting role as Alessandria in the feature length film Sarah Q.

=== Terrifier franchise ===
Scaffidi read the script for a film titled Terrifier written by the director Damien Leone and was initially reluctant to sign on to the project due to finding it "grotesque" and "horrifying"—but joined after a meeting with Leone. Scaffidi had to choose between the parts of Dawn and Victoria, choosing the latter as she related to the character more. Filming began in 2016, and Scaffidi describes filming it as a fun experience because she got to see how everything got put together and found Art the Clown actor David Howard Thornton to be very friendly on the set. During filming, Leone made it known to her that he intended to bring her back as Victoria in the follow-up film, Terrifier 2 (2022). She describes filming the sequel as a more enjoyable experience due to becoming familiar with the production crew (most of which were a part of the first film) and a better understanding of Victoria. Due to the Victoria character's disfigurement, Scaffidi had to wear extensive prosthetic makeup throughout filming parts 1 and 2. Terrifier went viral following its Netflix debut and has attracted a cult following, becoming Scaffidi's first role and project to obtain a growing fandom.

== Filmography ==
=== Film ===
Year	Title	Role	Notes
2013	Uncomfortable Silence	The Waitress	Short
2013	Derailing	Bea	Short
2015	The Networker	Michelle	
2015	Sam	Georgette	
2015	Act, Naturally	Samantha	Short
2016	Terrifier	Victoria "Vicky" Heyes	
2017	Demon Hole	Luce	
2017	American Fango	Kathy	
2018	Sarah Q	Alessandria	
2022	Terrifier 2	Victoria "Vicky" Heyes	
2024	Terrifier 3	Victoria "Vicky" Heyes	
