= Victoria Heyes =

Main character in the Terrifier films

- Terrifier character
- Samantha Scaffidi as Victoria Heyes before her disfigurement in Terrifier (2016) and after her disfigurement in Terrifier 2 (2022)
- First appearance: Terrifier (2016)
- Last appearance: Terrifier 3 (2024)
- Created by: Damien Leone
- Portrayed by: Samantha Scaffidi

In-universe information
- Full name: Victoria "Vicky" Heyes
- Species: Human (formerly); Demonic Possession (by The Little Pale Girl)
- Occupation: College student (former); Art's partner-in-crime
- Family: Tara Heyes (younger sister, deceased); Mr. Heyes (father); Mrs. Heyes (mother)
- Nationality: American
- Signature weapons: Mirror shard, crown of thorns
- Allies: Art the Clown
- Status: Deceased

Victoria Heyes is a fictional character in the Terrifier franchise. Initially a heroine, Victoria first appears in Terrifier (2016) as a college student who is left facially disfigured and driven insane after narrowly escaping the serial killer Art the Clown on Halloween night. The sequels follow her becoming possessed. She is portrayed by Samantha Scaffidi, who reprises the role in Terrifier 2 (2022) and Terrifier 3 (2024).

Damien Leone conceptualized her as a subversion of the final girl trope, having the false protagonist Tara Heyes killed off halfway through the film and depicting Victoria as a heroine who becomes a villain. While she is left underdeveloped in the first film, with much of the focus on showcasing the Art character, Leone wanted to develop Victoria significantly, so he brought her back into a leading role in the third film. Scaffidi views the character as a heroine descending into madness.

As the character has facial disfigurement, Scaffidi had to wear extensive prosthetics throughout the series. For the first two films, she only had to wear a prosthetic for her face, while in Terrifier 3, she had to wear additional prosthetics for her arms and legs for Victoria's undead appearance. Additionally, the third film features the character in Christmas themed clown makeup and attire that resembles Art's. In addition to the films, the character appears in literature and merchandise, such as graphic novels and a video game.

== Appearances ==
=== Films ===
The character made her cinematic debut in Terrifier in October 2016. In this film, Victoria (Samantha Scaffidi) is a nineteen-year-old college student studying for her midterms. She receives a call from her stranded sister Tara to pick her up. The murderous Art the Clown lures Victoria into a vacant warehouse. After discovering the corpses of his victims, Victoria engages in a battle with him. After the police arrive, Art runs her over in a pick-up truck, and he eats her face before killing himself upon police confrontation, leaving her disfigured. The disfigurement leaves her mentally unstable, and upon having a mental breakdown on a controversial talk show program, Victoria mutilates the host, Monica Brown.

Victoria returns in the post-credits scene of Terrifier 2 (2022)—she is shown to be institutionalized at the Miles County Psychiatric Hospital. Despite being referred to as being docile by her nurse, her stomach begins to swell, and she bleeds profusely, writing obscenities on the wall with blood along with the words Vicky + Art in a heart. The hospital staff walks in to see her with a glowing yellow eye, revealing she had become possessed by the Little Pale Girl, with Art's living head in her lap, having just given birth to it.

"...there's a lot more to explore with Art the Clown, the Pale Girl, Victoria and Sienna as our Final Girl. We'll be following her journey to the end of the franchise."

— Leone discussing returning characters.

The character returns to a more prominent role in Terrifier 3 (2024), which picks up directly after the second film. After killing the nurse overseeing her in the hospital, the demonically possessed Victoria escapes with Art to an abandoned house, where she smashes a mirror and kills herself with the shards. Five years later, two workers enter the house and awaken the dormant bodies of Victoria and Art, who proceed to kill them. Victoria makes a clown costume for herself to join Art as he attacks the house of Sienna Shaw and kidnaps her and their family. Victoria attempts to possess Sienna by putting a crown of thorns on her, but ends up killed as Sienna takes hold of her magic sword, and proceeds to stab and decapitate Victoria. As Victoria's body disintegrates, her blood opens a portal to a realm with a striking resemblance to Hell, into which Sienna's cousin, Gabbie, ends up falling. After Art flees the house to recover from his battle with Sienna, the latter is confident that her cousin is still alive and begins to prepare for her mission to rescue her.

=== Literature ===
Victoria makes her literary debut in the novelization Terrifier 2 (2024), written by Tim Waggoner. The novel provides Victoria with more character development, providing insight into her recovery, her relationship with her parents following her disfigurement and sister Tara's death, and the events leading up to her possession. In the novel, Victoria spends extensive time in rehabilitation and psychoanalysis at St. Michael's Hospital. She has no lips but has learned to speak with ventriloquist techniques. Her parents support her recovery; however, Victoria believes they resent her for not getting to the warehouse in time to rescue Tara. During one of her therapy sessions, Victoria encounters the Little Pale Girl for the first time, whose presence Victoria finds comfort in despite her resemblance to Art, even referring to her as "a friend" when seeing her again after being released from the hospital. After her disastrous interview with Monica Brown, under the influence of the Little Pale Girl, Victoria attacks Monica in her dressing room, which gets her sent to the Miles County Psychiatric Hospital, where she becomes possessed and gives birth to Art's head.

== Development ==
Victoria was created by Damien Leone. Leone made the original Terrifier film to showcase Art the Clown, who had become popular amongst audiences after appearing in short films and the anthology film All Hallows' Eve (2013). As a result, Leone left the protagonists of the 2016 film underdeveloped, particularly the Victoria character. Victoria acts as the bookending character and as a subversion of the final girl trope after the false protagonist, Tara Heyes, is killed off halfway through the film. While Leone was searching for the lead actors, a friend of his, Gino Cafarelli, who portrays an employee at a pizza restaurant, suggested Samantha Scaffidi for a role. Scaffidi auditioned, and Leone ultimately cast her as Victoria.

Leone brought Victoria back for the sequel Terrifier 2 (2022), writing her into the post-credits scene, which sets up the third film. Her original scene set up her demise, as she would have been in the psychiatric hospital, and instead of becoming pregnant, Art would have emerged from the back of her head; however, Leone found this ending to be too similar to the concept of the horror film Malignant (2021). Following a suggestion from production designer Olga Turka, Leone rewrote it to the birthing scene and her becoming possessed by the Little Pale Girl.

Leone wanted to give Victoria significant character development and make her a prominent figure in further installments in the series. He wrote her as the secondary antagonist in Terrifier 3 (2024), acting as Art's accomplice. Leone felt that writing her as a villain was a "risky" creative decision but states her characterization in the third film was "so organic, it was so necessary." Scaffidi describes Victoria's story arc as "this kind of final girl—or heroine—but descending into madness."

== In popular culture ==
In 2021, Victoria was featured in the three-issue graphic novels based on the first film. In December 2022, an officially licensed clay figurine of the character was released—depicting Victoria in her bloodied hospital gown. Victoria will appear as a player character in the upcoming beat 'em up arcade inspired video game Terrifier: The ARTcade Game (2025). Victoria will be a featured character in the upcoming Universal Orlando Terrifier Halloween Horror Nights amusement park attraction. In October 2025, Funko released a vinyl figurine of Victoria based on her appearance in Terrifier 3.

== Reception ==
In her debut appearance, the script describes her as a traumatized young woman struggling with her facial disfigurement. Writing for Comic Book Resources (CBR), Jon Mendelsohn describes Victoria as exhibiting traits of the slasher film "final girl" trope. He notes that she challenges the trope through her hopeless ending of having her face eaten off by Art and becoming both traumatized and murderous. Similarly, Apeksha Bagchi of We Got This Covered refers to Victoria as being a "final girl."

An analysis by Brendan D. describes Victoria as a reflection of Art—"Our most recent final girl is Victoria from Terrifier, and what makes her so unique is her post-final girl status. Most final girls appear in the sequel or following situation as a capable guide for the next group of cannon fodder to demonstrate the villain's return. Instead, the trauma corrupts Victoria; she becomes monstrous like Art, with a disfigured appearance; and the brutality of a live-show death when a talk-show host mocked her. She is not a heroine but a dark reflection of the atrocities Art the Clown committed, fit for ridicule and loathing."

Collider's Raquel Hollman states, "Victoria (Samantha Scaffidi) is introduced as our accidental final girl who is barely allowed to survive. In reality, Art just ran out of time. He leaves her face mutilated before being taken to the morgue. By leaving Victoria's face unrecognizable, Art essentially steals the film back from her. She isn't allowed to become an oppositional face or force to his story, instead, she is turned into another set piece by him. Everything to Art is a performance, and he's not letting a final girl steal his shine." Writing for the same website, Chris Sasaguay praises Victoria's development as a villain in the third film, describing her as scarier than Art. Sasaguay highlighted Scaffidi's portrayal and states that Art and Victoria's dynamic reflects darker versions of DC's Joker and Harley Quinn and that turning her into a "female bogeyman" complements Art. Rocco T. Thompson of Slant Magazine wrote that she is the more effective villain in the third film, stating that Samantha Scaffidi "exudes a chilling sense of evil from beneath pounds of prosthetics."

== Works cited ==
- Waggoner, Tim (2024). Terrifier 2: The Official Movie Novelization. Titan Publishing Group. ISBN 978-1-835-41321-0.
