= The Dead Place =

2026 American horror film

- Directed by: Michael Pickle
- Written by: Michael Pickle
- Produced by: Robert Bravo; Steve Deering; Jeremy Lee Dickson; Wesley Johnson; Lania Kayell; James Rivera
- Starring: Idris Veliu; David Howard Thornton; Angel Nichole Bradford
- Cinematography: Joaquin Silva
- Edited by: Melanie Mayumi
- Music by: Will Love
- Production company: Horror Show Pictures
- Release date: 1 June 2026 (United States)
- Running time: 1 hour and 40 minutes
- Country: United States
- Language: English

The Dead Place is a 2026 American supernatural horror film written and directed by Michael Pickle. The film stars Idris Veliu, David Howard Thornton, Bill Oberst Jr., and Lexi Graves. It is Thornton's first speaking film role; he had previously played the non-speaking character Art the Clown in the Terrifier franchise.

== Plot ==
Isaac Stecker (Idris Veliu), a troubled high school senior, is plagued by visions of the dead, which strains his family life and makes him an outcast at school. His close friend Katharine (Lexi Graves), who is fascinated by the paranormal, tries to help him understand his experiences. Following a family tragedy, a mysterious new student known only as "the New Kid" (David Howard Thornton) arrives and begins pushing Isaac toward a demonic entity (Bill Oberst Jr.) that seeks to possess him.

== Cast ==
- Idris Veliu as Isaac Stecker
- David Howard Thornton as the New Kid
- Bill Oberst Jr. as the demon
- Lexi Graves as Katharine
- Eliot as Dr. Brynne
- Angel Nichole Bradford
- Beatrice Boepple
- Suziey Block

== Production ==
Writer-director Michael Pickle made The Dead Place as his first feature film. The production was independently financed in part through a crowdfunding campaign on Indiegogo.

== Release ==
The film held a red-carpet theatrical premiere on June 10, 2026, at the Lumiere Cinema in Beverly Hills, California, with cast and crew in attendance. It began streaming exclusively on the BloodStreamTV service on June 1, 2026, ahead of the theatrical premiere, followed by a wider transactional video-on-demand release on August 5, 2026.

== Reception ==
Reviews of the film were generally mixed. Writing for ScreenAnarchy, a critic said the film turns what could have been a "bargain basement slasher" into something more substantive, describing Isaac's conflict with the New Kid as a metaphor for adolescent struggle. PopHorror's Alexandra Steele called it "a heartfelt indie horror project with admirable ambition" but felt its storytelling did not fully come together. Cinema Crazed praised Thornton's vocal performance but felt the film ran long and could have used tighter editing. Bloody Flicks was more critical, describing the film as suffering from "poor cinematography, stagnant pacing" and inconsistent acting.
