= All Hallows' Eve (2013 film) =

2013 film by Damien Leone

- DVD cover
- Directed by: Damien Leone
- Written by: Damien Leone
- Story by: Damien Leone; Jesse Baget
- Produced by: Jesse Baget; Gary LoSavio; Lisandro Novillo
- Starring: Katie Maguire; Catherine Callahan; Marie Maser; Kayla Lian; Mike Giannelli
- Cinematography: Christopher Cafaro; C.J. Eadicicco; George Steuber; Marvin Suarez
- Edited by: Damien Leone
- Music by: Noir Deco
- Production company: Ruthless Pictures
- Distributed by: Image Entertainment
- Release date: October 29, 2013 (DVD)
- Running time: 83 minutes
- Country: United States
- Language: English

All Hallows' Eve is a 2013 American independent horror anthology film written, edited, and directed by Damien Leone. The film is presented as a series of shorts that two children and their babysitter discover on an unmarked videotape on Halloween night, all of which feature a homicidal clown named Art the Clown. The film stars Katie Maguire, Catherine Callahan, Marie Maser, and Kayla Lian, with Mike Giannelli as Art the Clown. It incorporates footage from the 2008 short film The 9th Circle, as well as the 2011 short film Terrifier, both of which were also directed by Leone and featured Art the Clown.

All Hallows' Eve was released direct-to-video by Image Entertainment on October 29, 2013, and received mixed reviews. The film was followed by the standalone anthology-sequels All Hallows' Eve 2 (2015), All Hallows' Eve: Trickster (2023), and All Hallows' Eve: Inferno (2024), which feature segments by different directors. The character of Art the Clown would later be featured as the main character of the Terrifier franchise. Each installment was written and directed by Leone.

== Plot ==
On Halloween, after a night out trick-or-treating, children Tia and Timmy are surprised to find an unmarked VHS tape in their candy bag. Together with their babysitter Sarah, they watch the tape, which contains three stories featuring a homicidal clown named Art.

=== The 9th Circle ===
The first segment features a young woman named Casey, who is drugged and kidnapped by Art while waiting for a train. She awakens to find herself chained in a room with two other women, Kristen and Sara. When Sara is dragged away by her chain, Casey and Kristen follow her to see where their chains lead. Upon reaching the end of the chains, Casey attempts to break the chains with a large rock. A deformed humanoid appears and dismembers Kristen with a cleaver, unwittingly freeing Casey by severing her chains. She runs away and encounters a man with a shopping cart who she begs for help but the man recaptures her and she is soon tied down and surrounded by a hooded coven of witches. After watching the witches cut the fetus from the womb of a restrained pregnant woman, Casey is taken over by Satan.

Sarah sends Tia and Timmy to bed and continues watching the tape by herself.

=== Something in the Dark ===
The second segment features Caroline, who has just moved into a countryside home. At night, a bright object crashes near the house and a power outage occurs. Caroline's phone and car malfunctions and she suspects that someone else is in the house. She suddenly receives a call from her husband, John, a painter, but the connection soon breaks. She discovers that she is being stalked by an alien, and after managing to disorient it, she hides in a small room under a staircase. There, her phone rings again, alerting the alien to her location. As the alien drags her off, she pulls a sheet off of one of John's paintings, revealing an image of Art the Clown.

=== Terrifier ===
The third segment features a costume designer driving down an isolated road. Stopping at a gas station, she finds the attendant furiously kicking out Art, who had apparently smeared feces on the gas station's bathroom walls. While the attendant fills her tank and gives her directions, he hears a noise from inside the gas station. He goes inside to investigate, and when he does not return, the costume designer enters the building and sees Art chopping up his body with a hacksaw. She drives off and calls the police, but Art appears behind her seat and attempts to suffocate her with cellophane. She slams on the brakes and escapes, barricading herself inside a large shed. Art digs his way into the shed and slashes her with a makeshift whip. She stabs Art in the eye with a scalpel and in the back with a knife. She escapes again and is picked up by a man who tries to drive her to a nearby police station. Art pursues them in a car and kills the man with a handgun, causing their car to crash. After some time, the costume designer regains consciousness on a crude operating table and finds that Art has amputated her limbs and breasts and carved obscenities into her body.

=== Ending ===
Disturbed, Sarah turns off the TV. A home phone rings, and when Sarah answers it, she hears the costume designer from the third segment pleading for help. The television turns back on, displaying a dingy room. Art steps into the frame, approaches Sarah from within the screen, and begins to pound on the glass. Sarah then sees herself on the television screen, with Art behind her. She frantically removes the tape from the VCR and smashes it on the floor, destroying it. Shortly afterwards, she hears Tia and Timmy scream. Sarah runs upstairs and sees Art the Clown outside their room, covered in blood, laughing at her and gleefully gesturing for her to enter. Sarah covers her eyes in terror; when she uncovers them seconds later, Art has disappeared. Sarah enters the room, finding just Tia and Timmy's bodies slashed apart, and "ART" written on the wall in blood.

== Cast ==
- Katie Maguire as Sarah
- Catherine Callahan as Caroline
- Marie Maser as Costume Designer
- Kayla Lian as Casey
- Mike Giannelli as Art the Clown / Demon
- Sydney Freihofer as Tia
- Cole Mathewson as Timmy
- Brandon deSpain as Alien
- Michael Chmiel as Attendant / John (voice)
- Marissa Wolf as Kristen
- Minna Taylor as Sara
- Daniel Rodas as Man in Car
- Christine Evangelista as Scarecrow
- Anna Maliere as Pregnant Woman
- Eric Diez as Satan

== Production ==
"My intention wasn't to make an anthology film. [...] This was just a reason to get 'Terrifier' onto DVD and whip it into a feature just to get it out there to get more people familiar with Art the Clown and hopefully get a little bit more of a fanbase."

— Damien Leone on the anthology format of All Hallows' Eve.

Leone created the character of Art the Clown, who was first featured in the short film The 9th Circle, which Leone wrote and directed. The short was filmed on 35 mm in 2006 and premiered at the Backseat Film Festival in 2008. Leone then wrote and directed Terrifier, another short film featuring Art that was released in 2011. All Hallows' Eve producer Jesse Baget viewed the Terrifier short on YouTube, prompting him to consider including it in an anthology film with shorts by other filmmakers. According to Leone, "I wasn't having that, and talked him into letting me shoot everything. He was totally cool with it, and allowed me to write more and use the two shorts I had already made to create a whole, cohesive film."

The 9th Circle, with additional footage that was not included in the original short film, serves as the first segment of All Hallows' Eve, while the Terrifier short serves as the film's third segment. In regards to the film's second segment, Leone stated: "A lot of people ask me why we didn't do another Art the Clown story, and I felt if I gave people another 15 or 20 minutes of him killing someone, it would take away from the impact of 'Terrifier.'" He originally intended for the alien in the second segment to be created using puppetry, but due to time and budgetary constraints, the alien was portrayed by actor Brandon deSpain in a costume.

== Release ==
All Hallows' Eve was released on DVD and digital by Image Entertainment on October 29, 2013. It was first released on Blu-ray as a double feature with the 2013 film Mischief Night on September 9, 2014. Image re-released the film on DVD on September 13, 2016 as a double feature with the 2015 film All Hallows' Eve 2. All Hallows' Eve received a standalone Blu-ray release in August 2019. The film received a VHS release in September 2024 by RLJE Films. The film was released in Japan in 2024, retitled as Terrifier 0, to co-incide with the release of Terrifier 3.

== Reception ==
All Hallows' Eve received mixed reviews. Rod Lott of the Oklahoma Gazette wrote: "What All Hallows' Eve lacks in production value, writer/director/editor/makeup artist Damien Leone makes up for in pure passion. One can tell this guy loves the spirit of the season, and it shows in his terror trilogy, which has all the makings of becoming a minor cult hit." A reviewer for Ain't It Cool News praised the character of Art the Clown, calling him "somewhat iconic" and "pretty terrifying", but criticized the film's "paper-thin" storyline, writing that "I can only imagine the fear would have been multiplied exponentially had the filmmakers spent as much time on the story as they did with coming up with the creepy as all get-out monster."

Madeleine Koestner of Fangoria wrote that the film's first segment "makes absolutely no sense", and went on to call the second segment "inexcusably uninteresting", referring to the third segment as "easily the best of the three." She commended the special effects and character designs, and noted that "there's something legitimately creepy about this movie." Brad McHargue of Dread Central gave the film a score of 3.5 out of 5, writing that Art could "be destined to become a horror icon", concluding: "Through all of its flaws, [...] All Hallows' Eve shows tremendous talent both in front of and behind the camera. [...] while it's not a perfect film, it hints at a promising future for Leone and, if we're lucky, Art the Clown." Adrian Halen of HorrorNews.net called it "easily one of the scariest films I've seen this year", writing that it "tends to transcend its own setting by playing on viewers fears and sense of nightmarish realism."

Tom Becker of DVD Verdict criticized the film's "unimaginative writing, uninspired acting, and tacky effects", and wrote that "It's not a bad film, especially, just not a particularly good or memorable one. [...] Worth a look if your cable is out and you've exhausted Netflix and Redbox." Felix Vasquez Jr. of Cinema Crazed called the film "a pointless exercise in the anthology format with no real stand out stories, or performances in the bunch. Even with Generic the Clown acting as the basic clothesline for all of the tales, Damien Leone's indie anthology horror film is a very forgettable and dull genre entry."

== Sequels and spin-offs ==
All Hallows' Eve 2 is a standalone anthology film from Ruthless Pictures and producer/director Jesse Baget containing nine story segments, each with a different director. The film was released on VOD and digital on October 6, 2015, and had a DVD release on February 2, 2016. Two sequels, All Hallows' Eve: Trickster and All Hallows' Eve: Inferno, were released in 2023 and 2024, respectively.

A spin-off, full-length film featuring Art the Clown, titled Terrifier, was released in 2016. Terrifier was followed by Terrifier 2, which released in 2022 and a second sequel, Terrifier 3, released in 2024.

== See also ==
- List of films set around Halloween
