= Catherine Corcoran =

American actress

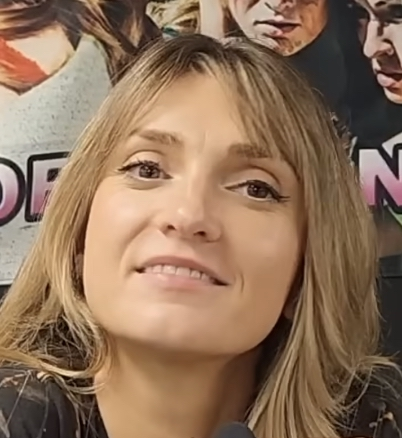
- Corcoran in 2025
- Born: May 30, 1992 (age 34); Southampton, Pennsylvania, U.S.
- Occupation: Actress
- Years active: 2009–present
- Known for: Terrifier
- Notable credits: Return to Nuke 'Em High Volume 1; Return to Return to Nuke 'Em High AKA Volume 2; Terrifier 2
- Website: catherinecorcoran.info

Catherine Corcoran (born May 30, 1992) is an American actress best known for her roles as Dawn Emerson in the Terrifier film franchise and Lauren Berggold in the Return to Nuke 'Em High films.

== Personal life ==
Corcoran was born in Philadelphia, Pennsylvania and lived in Holland. She later moved to New York City.

== Career ==
To market the film Return to Nuke 'Em High Volume 1 at the 2013 Cannes Film Festival, Lloyd Kaufman setup a sham marriage ceremony for Corcoran and co-star Asta Paredes during the film's premiere. In 2025, Corcoran started FareStream Pictures and hosted the first episode of Shout! TV's Double Take series.

=== Terrifier ===
While filming Terrifier, Corcoran expressed doubt that Damien Leone's film would become so popular. During the MeToo movement, women who worked at Dread Central's Dread Presents did not appreciate the fate of Corcoran's character or how it was used to market the film. In 2023, she was unable to confirm if her character would return for Terrifier 3.

In 2025, Corcoran filed a lawsuit against Leone and producer Phil Falcone for not giving written consent to film her nude or to depict her nude body on merchandise. The scene was shot with her upside down 40 seconds at a time over a 10 hour period. Corcoran was paid a $100 SAG minimum daily rate, but also negotiated for 1% of profits. She said she started receiving royalty checks when Terrifier 2 released, but claims to have only been paid over $8,000 for her involvement in the franchise. Us Weekly obtained a non-disclosure agreement that had Corcoran's signature but not Dark Age Cinema's, the production company behind the franchise.

== Filmography ==
Year	Title	Role	Notes
2009	The Lovely Bones	Murder Victim	Uncredited
2009	The Seduction of Eve	Daughter at door	
2011	Gossip Girl	Minion	Episode: "Petty in Pink"
2012	On the Case with Paula Zahn	Shelby	Episode: "The Art of Murder"
2013	Return to Nuke 'Em High Volume 1	Lauren Berggold	
2013	The Good Wife	Grace's Friend	Episode: "The Next Week"
2016	Chuck	Sandy	
2016	Terrifier	Dawn Emerson	
2017	Return to Return to Nuke 'Em High AKA Volume 2	Lauren Berggold	
2017	The Special Without Brett Davis		Episode: "A Warlords Christmas"
2018	Long Lost	Abby	
2018	Last Vermont Christmas	Audrey	TV Movie
2019	100 Acres of Hell	Sissy	
2019	Afterdeath		Short
2020	Shakespeare's Shitstorm	Miranda's Mom	
2020	Click Next to Continue	Dr. Crystal Madison	TV Short
2022	Terrifier 2	Dawn Emerson	
2023	Do Not Watch	Leslie	
2025	If It Bleeds	Diane Winters	
TBA	3 Days Rising	Annabel Poe	Film adaptation of Edgar Allan Poe's short story "The Fall of the House of Usher"
TBA	Jackalope	Lilly	
TBA	Attack of the Killer Tomatoes: Organic Intelligence		
