= Terrifier (film series) =

Horror media franchise

- Official franchise logo
- Created by: Damien Leone
- Original work: Terrifier (2016)
- Owner: Dark Age Cinema
- Years: 2016–present

Print publications
- Novel: Terrifier 2 (2024)
- Comics: Terrifier (2021–2022)

Films and television
- Films: Terrifier (2016); Terrifier 2 (2022); Terrifier 3 (2024)
- Short films: The 9th Circle (2008); Terrifier (2011)

Games
- Video game: Terrifier: The ARTcade Game (2025)

Audio
- Soundtracks: Terrifier (2018); Terrifier 2 (2022); Terrifier 3 (2025)
- Original music: "A Work of Art" (2024)

Terrifier is an American horror media franchise created by Damien Leone and consisting of slasher films, comic books, novels, and video games. The franchise mainly focuses on Sienna Shaw, a young woman destined to defeat the enigmatic Art the Clown, a demonic serial killer that inhabits the fictitious Miles County, New York. Additionally, the series follows the Little Pale Girl, a sinister entity accompanying Art, and Victoria Heyes, a disfigured survivor struggling with her mental health who the Little Pale Girl possesses, becoming Art's accomplice.

The franchise began in 2016 with a standalone feature-length film showcasing Art, who had previously appeared in unrelated short films and the anthology film All Hallows' Eve incorporating the shorts. The 2016 film had a generally mixed critical reception. Terrifier 2 (2022) was a box office success and received positive reviews. Terrifier 3 (2024) received generally positive reviews and was an even greater box office success, becoming the highest-grossing unrated film of all time. Terrifier 4, which Leone has said will likely be the conclusion of the franchise, is currently in the works.

== Films ==
Film	U.S. release date	Director	Screenwriter	Producers
Terrifier	March 15, 2016	Damien Leone	Damien Leone	Damien Leone, Phil Falcone and George Steuber
Terrifier 2	October 6, 2022	Damien Leone	Damien Leone	Damien Leone, Phil Falcone
Terrifier 3	October 11, 2024	Damien Leone	Damien Leone	Damien Leone, Phil Falcone
Terrifier 4	TBA	Damien Leone	Damien Leone	Damien Leone, Phil Falcone

=== Terrifier (2016) ===
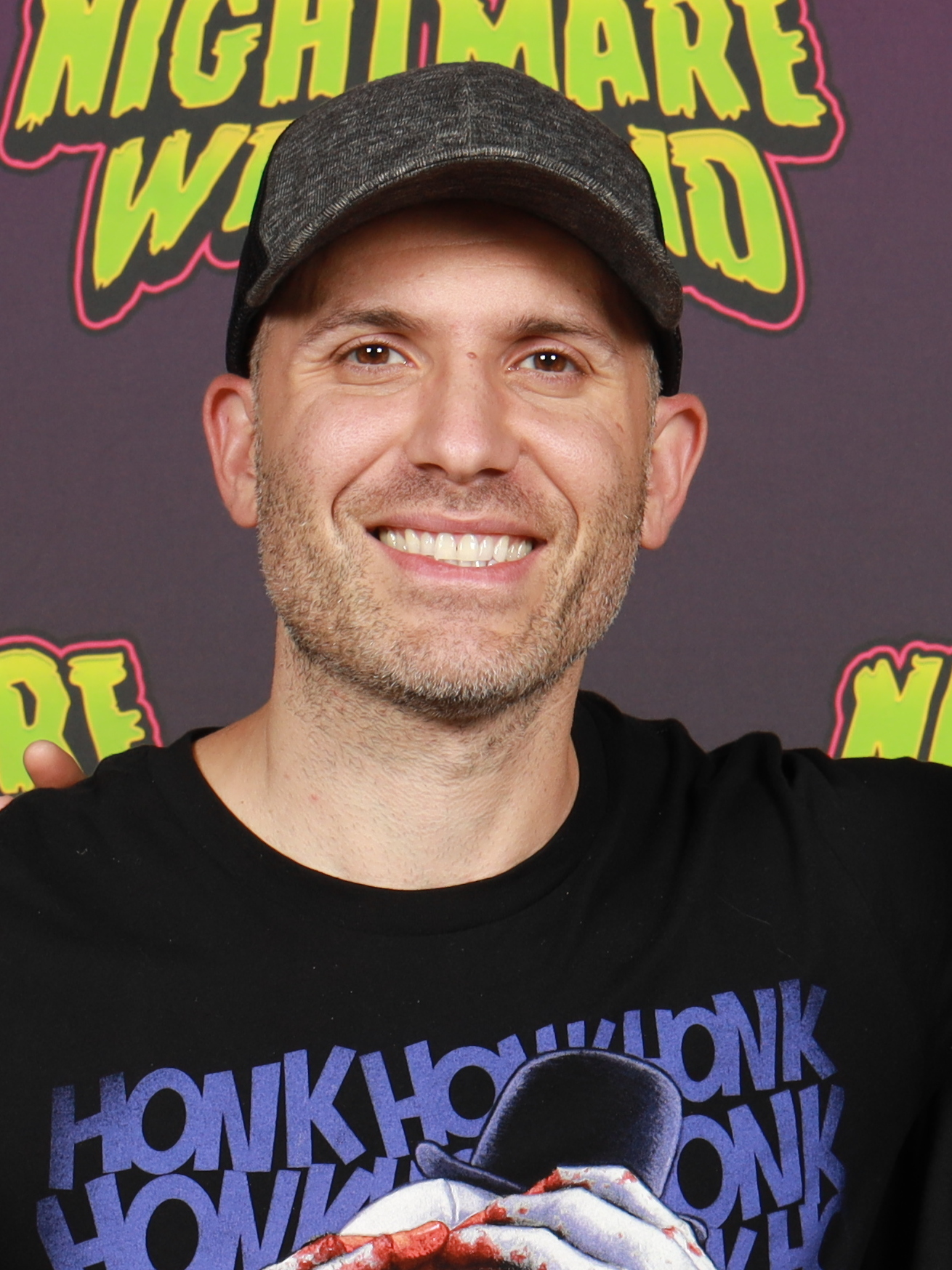
Terrifier franchise creator and director Damien Leone

On Halloween night, partygoer Tara Heyes (Jenna Kanell), her friend Dawn (Catherine Corcoran) and Tara's sister Victoria (Samantha Scaffidi) become the targets of an enigmatic serial killer known only as Art the Clown (David Howard Thornton).

Terrifier was re-released theatrically in 700 theaters on July 19, 2023.

=== Terrifier 2 (2022) ===
Following the events of Terrifier, Art is resurrected by a mysterious entity to continue his killing spree across Miles County and the pursuit of the teenage Sienna Shaw (Lauren LaVera) and her younger brother Jonathan (Elliott Fullam).

=== Terrifier 3 (2024) ===
After surviving Art the Clown's Halloween massacre, Sienna and her brother struggle to rebuild their shattered lives. As the holiday season approaches, they try to embrace the Christmas spirit and leave the horrors of the past behind. However, just when they think they're safe, Art returns, determined to turn their holiday cheer into a new nightmare.

=== Future ===
After previously expressing interest in 2022 to develop Terrifier 3 and Terrifier 4 back-to-back, Leone confirmed in February 2023 that he plans to make at least one more installment after the third film. The filmmaker explained that by the end of the franchise, the stories of Art the Clown, The Little Pale Girl, Victoria Heyes, and Sienna Shaw would be resolved.

By November of 2023, however, Leone stated that there may be additional installments after production on Terrifier 4 is completed, with the filmmaker stating that his goal is to create "... a satisfying franchise, [with] a satisfying conclusion where you could just watch it from start to finish and understand the journey and the arcs of your characters... but you never know what's going to happen down the line, but that is the goal is I don't want to make too many of these, and I want it to have a satisfying conclusion." The writer/director later confirmed that the franchise intentionally draws from Biblical imagery, with the story of Sienna's confrontations with Art, being that of an angel versus a demon.

In September 2024, Leone officially confirmed that Terrifier 4 is in development. Although originally intended to be the conclusion of the franchise, in October 2024, Leone clarified his comments of Terrifier 4 likely being the final film, stating the announcement was a bit “premature” and was uncertain whether the conclusion of the franchise would span over one or two more films. On January 29, 2025, Damien Leone posted on his social media during his birthday that the script for Terrifier 4 was in development, promising fans that it would be the final installment of the horror franchise and it would dive deeper into Art's origins. In May 2025, Leone, while attending Texas Frightmare Weekend, gave an update on the status of the 4th film saying "I know this word gets used a lot, but it's going to be epic. It's not going to disappoint. You're going to get Art's backstory in the first 15 minutes of the movie." WWE wrestler Rhea Ripley in a 2025 interview talked about how badly she wanted to appear in the fourth film. After hearing her comments, Damien Leone replied by teasing that she could appear in the next film by saying "The wheels are turning @RheaRipley_WWE."

In an October 2025 interview with Slasher Radio, David Howard Thornton discussed Terrifier 4, saying, “I'm very excited, but I don't know a whole lot, because this time around Damien has been keeping everything very close to his vest about what's happening in the script. Lauren [Lavera], Samantha [Scaffidi], and I, in the past when he's been writing the other scripts, he's been consulting us the whole entire time, running ideas by us. This time, he's been pretty much silent. He just goes, 'Oh yeah, you're gonna love the origin story, Dave. You're gonna love how we do it.' And he said also, 'The finale is bat-shit insane. You're gonna have a lot of fun with that.' Other than that, I don't know, but that makes me excited." Thornton also gave his input on if this will truly be the finale of the franchise by saying, "I feel like this might be the finale of this story arc that [Leone]'s going with for right now and might give it a rest for a few years and might return later on to it. I have no idea, but I'm excited nonetheless. I have so much faith in him."

== Primary cast and characters ==
List indicators

This section includes characters who will appear or have appeared in more than two films in the series.

- An empty grey cell indicates the character was not in the film, or that the character's official presence has not yet been confirmed.
- ^{A} indicates an appearance through archival footage or audio.
- ^{C} indicates a cameo role.
- ^{P} indicates an appearance in onscreen photographs.
- ^{Y} indicates a younger version of the character.

Character	Shorts		Films				
Character	The 9th Circle	Terrifier	All Hallows' Eve	Terrifier	Terrifier 2	Terrifier 3	Terrifier 4
Character	2008	2011	2013	2016	2022	2024	TBA
Recurring characters
Art the Clown	Mike Giannelli	Mike Giannelli	Mike Giannelli	David Howard Thornton	David Howard Thornton	David Howard Thornton	David Howard Thornton
Danny	Jose Gutierrez	Jose Gutierrez	Jose Gutierrez				Jose Gutierrez
Casey	Kayla Lian		Kayla Lian				
Scarecrow	Christine Evangelista		Christine Evangelista				
Pregnant Woman	Anna Maliere		Anna Maliere				
Satan	Eric Diez		Eric Diez				
Woman		Marie Maser	Marie Maser				
Attendant		Michael Chmiel	Michael Chmiel				
John		Michael Chmiel	Michael Chmiel				
Man in Car		Daniel Rodas	Daniel Rodas				
Victoria "Vicky" Heyes				Samantha Scaffidi	Samantha Scaffidi^{C}	Samantha Scaffidi	TBA
Tara Heyes				Jenna Kanell	Jenna Kanell^{P}		
Dawn Emerson				Catherine Corcoran	Catherine Corcoran^{P}		
The Coroner				Cory Duval	Cory Duval		
Monica Brown				Katie Maguire	Katie Maguire^{A}		
Sienna Shaw					Lauren LaVera	Lauren LaVera Luciana Elisa Quiñonez^{Y}	Lauren LaVera
Jonathan Shaw					Elliott Fullam	Elliott Fullam	TBA
The Little Pale Girl Emily Crane					Amelie McLain (Note: McLain also appears as Emily Crane in a photographic cameo.)		TBA
Adam Burke					Chris Jericho	Chris Jericho	
Brooke					Kailey Hyman	Kailey Hyman	
Gabbie Shaw						Antonella Rose	Antonella Rose
Single-film characters
Sarah			Katie Maguire				
Tia			Sydney Freihofer				
Timmy			Cole Mathewson				
Kristen			Marissa Wolf				
Sara			Minna Taylor				
The Cat Lady				Pooya Mohseni			
Will the Exterminator				Michael Leavy			
Mike the Exterminator				Matt McAllister			
Barbara Shaw					Sarah Voigt	Mentioned	
Allie					Casey Hartnett	Mentioned	
Jeff					Charlie McElveen	Mentioned	
Allie's Mother					Amy Russ		
Ricky					Johnath Davis		
Ms. Principe					Felissa Rose		
Costume shop mom					Tamara Glynn		
Jessica "Jess" Shaw						Margaret Anne Florence	
Greg Shaw						Bryce Johnson	
Santa Claus						Daniel Roebuck	
Michael Shaw					Mentioned	Jason Patric	
Mia						Alexa Blair Robertson	
Cole						Mason Mecartea	
Jennifer						Krsy Fox	
Officer Evans						Stephen Cofield Jr.	
Smokey						Clint Howard	
Eddie						Bradley Stryker	
Dennis						Jon Abrahams	

== Related films ==
Credited as the 2013 film that launched the spin-off Terrifier franchise, All Hallows' Eve was followed by a number of anthology-standalone sequels including All Hallows' Eve 2 (2015), All Hallows' Eve: Trickster (2023), and All Hallows' Eve: Inferno (2024). Producer Steve Barton stated that in collaboration with Horrible Imaginings Film Festival, future All Hallows' Eve installments would include combined independent horror short films, following their respective runs at film festivals; saying: "...the All Hallows’ Eve franchise will be a place for these movies to thrive and for these filmmakers to get the notice that they have so richly earned.” Jesse Baget, CEO of Ruthless Pictures, further explained that though the franchise was anthological in nature, each of the shorts takes place in the same shared continuity where the horrific characters "coexist".

Film	Segment	U.S. release date	Director(s)	Screenwriter(s)	Story by	Producer(s)
All Hallows' Eve	"Wrap-around segment"	October 29, 2013	Damien Leone	Damien Leone	Damien Leone & Jesse Baget	Jesse Baget
All Hallows' Eve	The 9th Circle	October 29, 2013	Damien Leone	Damien Leone	Damien Leone & Jesse Baget	Jesse Baget
All Hallows' Eve	Something in the Dark	October 29, 2013	Damien Leone	Damien Leone	Damien Leone & Jesse Baget	Jesse Baget
All Hallows' Eve	Terrifier	October 29, 2013	Damien Leone	Damien Leone	Damien Leone & Jesse Baget	Jesse Baget
All Hallows' Eve 2	Trickster (2015)	October 6, 2015	Jesse Baget	Jesse Baget	Jesse Baget	Damien Leone, Jesse Baget and Kimberley Browning
All Hallows' Eve 2	Jack Attack	October 6, 2015	Bryan Norton & Antonio Padovan	Bryan Norton & Antonio Padovan	Bryan Norton & Antonio Padovan	Damien Leone, Jesse Baget, Kimberley Browning, Lucia Bellini and Joseph Zaso
All Hallows' Eve 2	The Last Halloween	October 6, 2015	Marc Roussel	Marc Roussel and Mark Thibodeau	Marc Roussel and Mark Thibodeau	Damien Leone, Jesse Baget, Kimberley Browning, Ron Basch, Marc Roussel, Jessica Menagh, Greg Machula, Mark Thibodeau and John Nicholls
All Hallows' Eve 2	The Offering	October 6, 2015	Ryan Patch	Michael Koehler	Michael Koehler	Damien Leone, Jesse Baget, Kimberley Browning, Joanna Bowzer, Ryan Patch and Michael Koehler
All Hallows' Eve 2	Descent	October 6, 2015	Jay Holben	Jay Holben & Christopher Probst	Jay Holben & Christopher Probst	Damien Leone, Jesse Baget, Kimberley Browning, Jay Holben and Christopher Probst
All Hallows' Eve 2	Masochist	October 6, 2015	Jon Kondelik & James Kondelik	Jon Kondelik & James Kondelik	Jon Kondelik & James Kondelik	Damien Leone, Jesse Baget, and Kimberley Browning
All Hallows' Eve 2	A Boy's Life	October 6, 2015	Elias Benavidez	Elias Benavidez	Elias Benavidez	Damien Leone, Jesse Baget, Kimberley Browning and Allison Vanore
All Hallows' Eve 2	Mr. Trickster's Treat	October 6, 2015	Mike Kochansky	Mike Kochansky & Mark Byers	Mike Kochansky & Mark Byers	Damien Leone, Jesse Baget, Kimberley Browning, Mike Kochansky and Mark Byers
All Hallows' Eve 2	Alexia	October 6, 2015	Andrés Borghi	Andrés Borghi	Andrés Borghi	Damien Leone, Jesse Baget and Kimberley Browning
All Hallows' Eve: Trickster	Trickster (2023)	October 31, 2023	Evan Tramel	Evan Tramel	Evan Tramel	Steve Barton, Evan Tramel, Miguel Rodriguez
All Hallows' Eve: Trickster	That Halloween	October 31, 2023	Mike Hickey	Mike Hickey	Mike Hickey	Steve Barton, Evan Tramel, Miguel Rodriguez and Christian Davis
All Hallows' Eve: Trickster	PrettyFace	October 31, 2023	Francesco Depinto & Fay Johnson	Francesco Depinto	Francesco Depinto	Steve Barton, Evan Tramel, Miguel Rodriguez, Jess Dubois and Brit Godish
All Hallows' Eve: Trickster	Poor Glenna	October 31, 2023	Jean-Paul Disciscio	Jean-Paul Disciscio	Jean-Paul Disciscio	Steve Barton, Evan Tramel, Miguel Rodriguez and Sarah Bordelon
All Hallows' Eve: Trickster	Nagual	October 31, 2023	Dan "Laz" Lazarovits	Phil DeSanti and Dan "Laz" Lazarovits	Phil DeSanti	Steve Barton, Evan Tramel, Miguel Rodriguez, Dan "Laz" Lazarovits, Phil DeSanti and Craig Blair
All Hallows' Eve: Trickster	Witch Hunt	October 31, 2023	Evan Gorski	Evan Gorski	Evan Gorski	Steve Barton, Evan Tramel, Miguel Rodriguez and Ryan Robert Minford
All Hallows' Eve: Trickster	Karaoke Night	October 31, 2023	Francisco Lacerda	Francisco Lacerda & Amarino França	Francisco Lacerda & Amarino França	Steve Barton, Evan Tramel, Miguel Rodriguez, Amarino França and Mário Patrocínio
All Hallows' Eve: Inferno	"Wrap-around segment"	October 1, 2024	Evan Tramel	Lidia Lee	Lidia Lee	Steve Barton and Evan Tramel
All Hallows' Eve: Inferno	In Lucidity	October 1, 2024	Kays Al-Atrakchi	Kays Al-Atrakchi	Kays Al-Atrakchi	Steve Barton, Evan Tramel and Richard J. Dubin
All Hallows' Eve: Inferno	Hammurabi	October 1, 2024	Patrick Kennelly	Bethany Orr	Bethany Orr	Steve Barton, Evan Tramel, Bethany Orr and Leo Garcia
All Hallows' Eve: Inferno	Bakemono	October 1, 2024	Sumire Takamatsu & Jorge Lucas	Sumire Takamatsu & Jorge Lucas	Sumire Takamatsu & Jorge Lucas	Steve Barton, Evan Tramel, William Nawrocki, Jorge Lucas and Sumire Takamatsu
All Hallows' Eve: Inferno	Aftertaste	October 1, 2024	Christianne Cruz	Christianne Cruz	Christianne Cruz	Steve Barton, Evan Tramel, Sean Patrick Kelly, Christianne Cruz, Alex Ott and Cindy Lu
All Hallows' Eve: Inferno	Trial 22	October 1, 2024	John Ferrer	Harry Metcalfe & John Ferrer	Harry Metcalfe & John Ferrer	Steve Barton, Evan Tramel, John Otteson and Nathan M. Legger

== Additional crew and production details ==
Title	Segment	Crew/Detail					
Title	Segment	Composer(s)	Cinematographer(s)	Editor(s)	Production companies	Distributing companies	Running time
The 9th Circle		Frank Nello	Tom Agnello	Damien Oramas	Damien Leone Films		11 minutes
Terrifier (2011)		Zack Bourne & Christopher M. Stark	Christopher Cafaro	Damien Leone	D&D Films LLC		20 minutes
All Hallows' Eve		Noir Deco and Zack Bourne & Christopher M. Stark	Christopher Cafaro, Tom Agnello, George Steuber, Marvin Suarez & Christopher Eadicicco	Damien Leone	Ruthless Pictures, RLJE Films	RLJ Entertainment	83 minutes
All Hallows' Eve 2	Trickster (2015)	Jesse Baget			Ruthless Pictures, RLJ Films, Image Entertainment, Hollywood Shorts, Brickwall Productions, (Note: This studio is credited as a production company only on Jack Attack.); Red Sneakers Media, (Note: This studio is credited as a production company only on The Last Halloween.); Bitter River Film & Media, (Note: This studio is credited as a production company only on The Offering.); Adakin Productions, (Note: This studio is credited as a production company only on Descent.); Fractured Atlas Productions, (Note: This studio is credited as a production company only on A Boy's Life.) Toronía Producciones (Note: This studio is credited as a production company only on Alexia.)	RLJ Entertainment	91 minutes
All Hallows' Eve 2	Jack Attack	Marco Werba	Gordon Yu	Mike Maclean	Ruthless Pictures, RLJ Films, Image Entertainment, Hollywood Shorts, Brickwall Productions, Red Sneakers Media, Bitter River Film & Media, Adakin Productions, Fractured Atlas Productions, Toronía Producciones	RLJ Entertainment	91 minutes
All Hallows' Eve 2	The Last Halloween	Christopher Guglick	Michael Jari Davidson	John Nicholls	Ruthless Pictures, RLJ Films, Image Entertainment, Hollywood Shorts, Brickwall Productions, Red Sneakers Media, Bitter River Film & Media, Adakin Productions, Fractured Atlas Productions, Toronía Producciones	RLJ Entertainment	91 minutes
All Hallows' Eve 2	The Offering	Samuel Estes	Andrew Michael Ellis	Frank Dale Arroyo	Ruthless Pictures, RLJ Films, Image Entertainment, Hollywood Shorts, Brickwall Productions, Red Sneakers Media, Bitter River Film & Media, Adakin Productions, Fractured Atlas Productions, Toronía Producciones	RLJ Entertainment	91 minutes
All Hallows' Eve 2	Descent	Buck Sanders	Christopher Probst	Dan O'Brien	Ruthless Pictures, RLJ Films, Image Entertainment, Hollywood Shorts, Brickwall Productions, Red Sneakers Media, Bitter River Film & Media, Adakin Productions, Fractured Atlas Productions, Toronía Producciones	RLJ Entertainment	91 minutes
All Hallows' Eve 2	Masochist	Michael John Mollo	Kyle Stryker	James Kondelik	Ruthless Pictures, RLJ Films, Image Entertainment, Hollywood Shorts, Brickwall Productions, Red Sneakers Media, Bitter River Film & Media, Adakin Productions, Fractured Atlas Productions, Toronía Producciones	RLJ Entertainment	91 minutes
All Hallows' Eve 2	A Boy's Life	Hamdija Ajanovic	Aaron Moorhead	Frank Mohler	Ruthless Pictures, RLJ Films, Image Entertainment, Hollywood Shorts, Brickwall Productions, Red Sneakers Media, Bitter River Film & Media, Adakin Productions, Fractured Atlas Productions, Toronía Producciones	RLJ Entertainment	91 minutes
All Hallows' Eve 2	Mr. Tricker's Treat	Mark Byers	Graham Bremner	Mike Kochansky	Ruthless Pictures, RLJ Films, Image Entertainment, Hollywood Shorts, Brickwall Productions, Red Sneakers Media, Bitter River Film & Media, Adakin Productions, Fractured Atlas Productions, Toronía Producciones	RLJ Entertainment	91 minutes
All Hallows' Eve 2	Alexia	Pablo Borghi	Julián Batistuta	Andrés Borghi	Ruthless Pictures, RLJ Films, Image Entertainment, Hollywood Shorts, Brickwall Productions, Red Sneakers Media, Bitter River Film & Media, Adakin Productions, Fractured Atlas Productions, Toronía Producciones	RLJ Entertainment	91 minutes
Terrifier (2016)		Paul Wiley	George Steuber	Damien Leone	Dark Age Cinema	Dread Central	85 minutes
Terrifier 2		Paul Wiley	George Steuber	Damien Leone	Dark Age Cinema, Bloody Disgusting, Fuzz on the Lens Productions	Cinedigm Entertainment Group, Bloody Disgusting	138 minutes
All Hallows' Eve: Trickster	Trickster (2023)	Storm Watters	Director of Animation: Islam Belal	Evan Tramel	Ruthless Studios, Monster-Movies.tv, Davis Film Inc., (Note: This studio is credited as a production company only on That Halloween.); IndieGogo Films, (Note: This studio is credited as a production company only on PrettyFace.); Overdue Films, (Note: This studio is credited as a production company only on Poor Glenna.); Filmed Imagination (Note: This studio is credited as a production company only on Nagual.)	Ruthless Studios LLC, TubiTV	88 minutes
All Hallows' Eve: Trickster	That Halloween	Baz Fratelli	Duncan DeYoung	Mike Hickey	Ruthless Studios, Monster-Movies.tv, Davis Film Inc., IndieGogo Films, Overdue Films, Filmed Imagination	Ruthless Studios LLC, TubiTV	88 minutes
All Hallows' Eve: Trickster	PrettyFace	Ray Magnuski	Fay Johnson & Jeffrey Caban	Josh Petrino	Ruthless Studios, Monster-Movies.tv, Davis Film Inc., IndieGogo Films, Overdue Films, Filmed Imagination	Ruthless Studios LLC, TubiTV	88 minutes
All Hallows' Eve: Trickster	Poor Glenna	Steve Moore	Shaun Clarke	Jean-Paul Disciscio	Ruthless Studios, Monster-Movies.tv, Davis Film Inc., IndieGogo Films, Overdue Films, Filmed Imagination	Ruthless Studios LLC, TubiTV	88 minutes
All Hallows' Eve: Trickster	Nagual	Marc Timon	Simon Dennis & Judd Overton	Javier Dampierre	Ruthless Studios, Monster-Movies.tv, Davis Film Inc., IndieGogo Films, Overdue Films, Filmed Imagination	Ruthless Studios LLC, TubiTV	88 minutes
All Hallows' Eve: Trickster	Witch Hunt	Alexander Taylor	Michael Babyak	Evan Gorski	Ruthless Studios, Monster-Movies.tv, Davis Film Inc., IndieGogo Films, Overdue Films, Filmed Imagination	Ruthless Studios LLC, TubiTV	88 minutes
All Hallows' Eve: Trickster	Karaoke Night	Antoni Maiovvi	Hugo França	Francisco Lacerda	Ruthless Studios, Monster-Movies.tv, Davis Film Inc., IndieGogo Films, Overdue Films, Filmed Imagination	Ruthless Studios LLC, TubiTV	88 minutes
All Hallows' Eve: Inferno	"Wrap-around segment"	Evan Tramel		Russ Wu	Ruthless Studios, Indiegogo Inc., (Note: This studio is credited as a production company only on Bakemono.); D.I.Y. or Die Productions, (Note: This studio is credited as a production company only on Bakemono.); Alias Films, (Note: This studio is credited as a production company only on Aftertaste.); 3A: 3rd Astronaut Productions, (Note: This studio is credited as a production company only on Aftertaste.); Three Wheel Entertainment (Note: This studio is credited as a production company only on Trial 22.)	Ruthless Studios LLC, TubiTV	74 minutes
All Hallows' Eve: Inferno	In Lucidity	Kays Al-Atrakchi	Christian Janss	Robert Zalkind	Ruthless Studios, Indiegogo Inc., D.I.Y. or Die Productions, Alias Films, 3A: 3rd Astronaut Productions, Three Wheel Entertainment	Ruthless Studios LLC, TubiTV	74 minutes
All Hallows' Eve: Inferno	Hammurabi	Jonathan Snipes	Gavin V. Murray	Patrick Kennelly	Ruthless Studios, Indiegogo Inc., D.I.Y. or Die Productions, Alias Films, 3A: 3rd Astronaut Productions, Three Wheel Entertainment	Ruthless Studios LLC, TubiTV	74 minutes
All Hallows' Eve: Inferno	Bakemono	Emi Nishida	Rob Silcox	William Nawrocki	Ruthless Studios, Indiegogo Inc., D.I.Y. or Die Productions, Alias Films, 3A: 3rd Astronaut Productions, Three Wheel Entertainment	Ruthless Studios LLC, TubiTV	74 minutes
All Hallows' Eve: Inferno	Aftertaste	Emily Greene & John Zarcone	Zeus Morand	Christopher J. Ewing	Ruthless Studios, Indiegogo Inc., D.I.Y. or Die Productions, Alias Films, 3A: 3rd Astronaut Productions, Three Wheel Entertainment	Ruthless Studios LLC, TubiTV	74 minutes
All Hallows' Eve: Inferno	Trial 22	Savage & Spies	Charlie Martin	John Ferrer	Ruthless Studios, Indiegogo Inc., D.I.Y. or Die Productions, Alias Films, 3A: 3rd Astronaut Productions, Three Wheel Entertainment	Ruthless Studios LLC, TubiTV	74 minutes
Terrifier 3		Paul Wiley	George Steuber	Damien Leone	Dark Age Cinema, Bloody Disgusting, Fuzz on the Lens Productions, Cineverse, Screambox	Cinedigm Entertainment Group, Bloody Disgusting	125 minutes

== Reception ==
=== Box office and financial performance ===
Film	Box office gross			Box office ranking		Video sales gross	Budget	Ref.
Film	North America	Other territories	Worldwide	All time North America	All time worldwide	North America	Budget	Ref.
Terrifier	$339,946	$81,852	$421,798	#10,743	#19,792	—N/a	$35,000	
Terrifier 2	$10,962,499	$4,853,103	$15,815,602	#5,228	#6,278	$4,687,297	$250,000	
Terrifier 3	$53,981,071	$36,341,032	$90,322,103	#1,730	#2,350	—N/a	$2,000,000	
Total	$65,283,516	$41,275,987	$106,559,503			$4,687,297	$2,285,000	

=== Critical and public response ===
Film	Rotten Tomatoes	Metacritic
Terrifier	63% (27 reviews)	—N/a (0 reviews)
Terrifier 2	87% (83 reviews)	59/100 (8 reviews)
Terrifier 3	78% (122 reviews)	62/100 (19 reviews)

== Other media ==
=== Literature ===
==== Comic books ====
Between 2021 and 2022, a self-published two-issue limited comic book series adaptation of Terrifier was released by Damien Leone with illustrations by Steve McGinnis.

==== Novels ====
Novelizations of Terrifier 2 and Terrifier 3 written by Tim Waggoner were released by Titans Books in 2024 and 2025 respectively.

=== Television ===
David Howard Thornton reprised his role as Art the Clown in the 2023 Peacock series Bupkis. Starring Pete Davidson as a fictionalized version of himself, the segment featured the character in a comedic scenario. Leone was involved with filming the segment for the series.

In December 2024, it was announced that David Howard Thornton would appear as Art the Clown in A Very Special Terrifier Christmas, which was released on December 24, 2024.

=== Video games ===
A beat 'em up game titled Terrifier: The ARTcade Game was announced in October 2024 and released on November 21, 2025 on Nintendo Switch, PlayStation 5, Xbox Series X/S, and Windows.

Art the Clown appeared as a playable character in the battle royale game Call of Duty: Warzone, the first-person shooter game Call of Duty: Modern Warfare III, and the battle royale game Fortnite. A Terrifier chapter for the asymmetrical horror game Dead by Daylight will release on November 24, 2026.

=== Music ===
A song by Ice Nine Kills based on Art the Clown called "A Work of Art" is featured in Terrifier 3.

=== Universal's Halloween Horror Nights (2025) ===
On July 10, 2025, it was announced that a Terrifier-themed haunted house would appear at Halloween Horror Nights 2025 in Universal Studios Hollywood and Halloween Horror Nights 34 in Universal Orlando Resort. It also featured scare actors depicting various versions of Art roaming throughout the park.

== Lawsuits ==
=== Catherine Corcoran lawsuit ===
On October 27, 2025, nearly ten years after the release of the first Terrifier film, actress Catherine Corcoran filed a federal lawsuit against the filmmakers, accusing them of shortchanging her on promised residuals and profit percentages. Corcoran reached an agreement with producer Phil Falcone and director Damien Leone to star in the film for a low per diem rate in exchange for one percent of profits from the film, any future films in the franchise, and merchandise related to the film. The lawsuit alleges that producer Phil Falcone and director Damien Leone have only paid her $8,341 to date, despite the franchise's immense success, and specifically noting the usage of her image and likeness by Spirit Halloween, Hot Topic, and Halloween Horror Nights.

Corcoran's lawsuit also accuses the filmmakers of sexual harassment, including by distributing sexually explicit material without her consent. Under SAG-AFTRA rules, any nude or topless scenes must have prior authorization, which Corcoran said that she did not give before being forced to hang nude upside down for ten hours. During a lengthy and incorrectly performed silicone molding process, which resulted in Corcoran being painfully glued to a plywood sheet, the lawsuit alleges that Falcone took "numerous still photographs of Corcoran's nude body" without her consent. Leone and Falcone have denied all allegations. In a response from horror podcaster Chelsea Rebecca, it was suggested that Corcoran had not intended for the lawsuit to become public.

=== Ruthless Studios lawsuit ===
In 2026, Ruthless Studios filed a lawsuit in federal court in California, accusing production companies Dark Age Cinema and Art the Clown LLC of copyright infringement, trademark infringement, unfair competition, and improperly profiting from the Terrifier franchise without authorization. At the center of the dispute is a series of agreements signed in 2013 between Damien Leone and Ruthless Pictures, whose rights were later assigned to Ruthless Studios. According to the complaint, Leone transferred ownership of the original Terrifier and The 9th Circle short films, along with related copyrights, trademarks, sequel rights, and derivative works, to the company for $5,000.
