= Demon Hole =

2017 American black comedy slasher film

- Theatrical poster
- Directed by: Josh Crook
- Written by: Josh Crook
- Produced by: Lori Crook
- Starring: Samantha Scaffidi; Austin Ramsey; Paris Campbell; Summer Bills; Adrian Denzel
- Cinematography: Guy Morgan
- Edited by: Josh Crook
- Music by: Lizard McGee
- Distributed by: SC Films; SP Releasing
- Release date: May 22, 2017 (Cannes)
- Running time: 82 minutes
- Country: United States
- Language: English

Demon Hole is a 2017 American black comedy slasher film written, edited, and directed by Josh Crook. It stars Samantha Scaffidi as Luce, a rebellious homeless girl who serves community service in a desolate forest with five other teens—at a site where a fracking crew unleashed the demonic entity Molok (Samhain).

The film premiered at the Cannes Film Festival on May 22, 2017.

== Premise ==
Demon Hole charts the fallout after a fracking crew drills a hole on sacred Native American land unleashing an ancient demon, which then terrorizes six teens serving community service in a remote forest.

— Josh Crook

== Cast ==
- Samantha Scaffidi as Luce
- Austin Ramsey as Kyle
- Paris Campbell as Reggie
- Summer Bills as Tiffany
- Adrian Denzel

== Development ==
In 2016, filming began, when Samantha Scaffidi, Austin Ramsey, Paris Campbell, Summer Bills and Adrian Denzel were cast in the comedy horror film Demon Hole.

== Release ==
The film premiered at the 2017 Cannes Film Festival on May 22, 2017 and was picked up by SC Films and SP Releasing.

== Reception ==
Dutch film magazine Schokkend Nieuws highlighted the film's premise in their review as being "promising," but the film ends up being a "missed opportunity." The magazine criticizes it for failing to delve into the political undertones it initially suggests to address. As a result, the magazine writes, "it did not become a critical and politically relevant film." It condemns the film for abandoning the initial political turmoil themes to succumb to a predictable plot.
