= Digital casting =

Digital casting is a process that enables both talent and people who solicit and employ talent to fulfill production requirements in the entertainment, corporate, non-profit, art, amateur and marketing industries through the use of on-line, mobile and digital technology.

Digital casting platforms allow talent to create online profiles to solicit opportunities for themselves through the use of a "self tape" regardless of professional representation from a manager or talent agent. Talent profiles generally include photographs, resumes, video reels, voice over reels and detailed accounting of special skills and unique attributes. Many of these platforms, including Actors Access, Backstage, Actors Equity Casting Call, Playbill, Casting Frontier, ModelMayhem, Now Casting and NYCastings have become industry standards and are used to cast talent in television series, feature films and commercials as well as live performances, televised talent competitions musicals, corporate entertainment and print advertising.

== History ==
Though early versions of digital casting platforms began to appear in the late 1990s, the 'revolution' in casting didn't engage until after the start of the 21st Century when audio and video technology improved for general on-line users through open systems and digital recording devices such as cameras and mobile phone image capture technology became widely available and affordable. Advances in uploading speed, image and digital transmitting technology, along with casting specific technology including Cast It Systems and Casting Frontier's iSession applications encouraged the growth and use of online casting from both amateur and professional talent.

In 2008, as a reaction to the arrival of digital casting platforms, the Screen Actors Guild (SAG) launched a free and dedicated system called iActor, which was the first union-hosted online casting directory featuring onsite Station 12 cast clearance. While iActor was exclusively available to SAG members, it also enabled AFTRA talent to create profiles.

== List of established platforms ==
- Actors Access
- Actors Equity Casting Call
- Backstage
- Casting Frontier
- Casting Networks
- iActor
- LACasting
- Mandy (formerly Casting Call Pro)
- NYCastings.com
- Playbill
