= Jenna Kanell =

American director and writer

- Born: November 12, 1991 (age 34)
- Occupation: Actress
- Years active: 2010–present

Jenna Kanell (born November 12, 1991) is an American actress, director, writer, and stunt performer. She gained recognition for her portrayals of Tara Heyes in Terrifier (2016) and Kim Hines in The Bye Bye Man (2017)—both horror films in which she performed her own stunt work. Her film career has since expanded to a variety of genres such as the political drama The Front Runner (2018), the horror-comedy Renfield (2023), and the action comedy Bad Boys: Ride or Die (2024).

On television, Kanell has made appearances on shows such as the Disney+ miniseries WandaVision (2021) and the Showtime anthology series The First Lady (2022).

== Career ==
Jenna Kanell delivered a TEDx Talk on the experience of writing, directing, and producing the short film “Bumblebees” alongside her disabled younger brother Vance Kanell. The project went on to screen at over forty film festivals and events around the world, winning numerous awards and bringing the siblings to speak at institutions such as Harvard Medical School.

Kanell gained recognition for her portrayal of Tara Heyes in Damien Leone's slasher film Terrifier (2016)—which obtained a cult following after its Netflix debut. Kanell later had a supporting role as Kim Hines in Stacy Title's horror film The Bye Bye Man (2017), which received negative reviews. However, her performance was well-received; Variety wrote, "...the one who, all too briefly, steals the movie: Jenna Kanell." Both performances garnered comparisons to Neve Campbell's portrayals in The Craft (1996) and Scream (1996).

She has since starred in several significant short films, including "Max & the Monster", a dark comedy short film she wrote, directed, and produced which premiered on the opening night of the 2018 Austin Film Festival, and Ben Joyner’s sci-fi short film “Abducted”, which premiered at the 2021 Tribeca Film Festival. A Voice for the Innocent, a resource for survivors of abuse, incorporated the former film into their training at the time of release.

After her appearance in Marvel’s WandaVision in 2021, Looper spotlighted her in an article titled “Why The Med Tech In WandaVision Looks So Familiar”, calling her an “up-and-coming triple-threat...and general cinematic jack of all trades.”

== Personal life ==
She has expressed socialist political views and has said that her moral compass is guided by ecofeminism. Jenna has practiced strict veganism for years, citing environmental racism, animal welfare, and bodily health as the prime motivators.

== Filmography ==
=== Film ===
Year	Title	Role	Notes
2012	Sassy Pants	Anna	
2016	Terrifier	Tara Heyes	Stunt performer
2017	The Bye Bye Man	Kim Hines	Stunt performer
2018	The Front Runner	Ginny Terzano	
2022	Faceless After Dark	Bowie	Also writer and producer
2022	Terrifier 2	Tara Heyes (Note: Kanell is credited in this film as "Tara" although she only makes a cameo appearance through a photograph.)	Cameo
2023	Renfield	Carol	Stunt performer
2024	Bad Boys: Ride or Die	Nicole	
2024	Red One	Krampus Guest	
2024	The Buildout	Cameron	

=== Television ===
Year	Title	Role	Episode(s)
2011	Drop Dead Diva	Nina Dunn	season 3, episode 5
2014	The Vampire Diaries	Jessie	season 6, episode 1
2017	Shots Fired	Cara	season 1, episode 3
2017	NCIS: New Orleans	Laura Dawson	season 4, episode 5
2019	Step Up: High Water	Director	season 2, episode 3
2019	Hot Date	Erin	season 2, episode 3
2020	The Resident	Safety Coordinator	season 3, episode 11
2020	Your Worst Nightmare	Joi Partain	season 6, episode 2
2021	WandaVision	Med Tech	episode 5
2022	Queens	Patti	season 1, episode 3
2022	The First Lady	Activist	season 1, episode 6
2022	Young Rock	Jamie	season 2, episodes 4 and 11
2022	Tales	Rebecca, stunt performer	season 3, episode 9

=== Music videos ===
- "This Is Our Life" by Des Rocs
- "These Days" by Highly Suspect
- "Superbloom" by Silent Planet

== Works cited ==
- Hafdahl, Meg (February 8, 2020). The Science of Women in Horror: The Special Effects, Stunts, and True Stories Behind Your Favorite Fright Films. Skyhorse. ISBN 978-1510751-76-7.
