= David Howard Thornton =

American actor (born 1979)

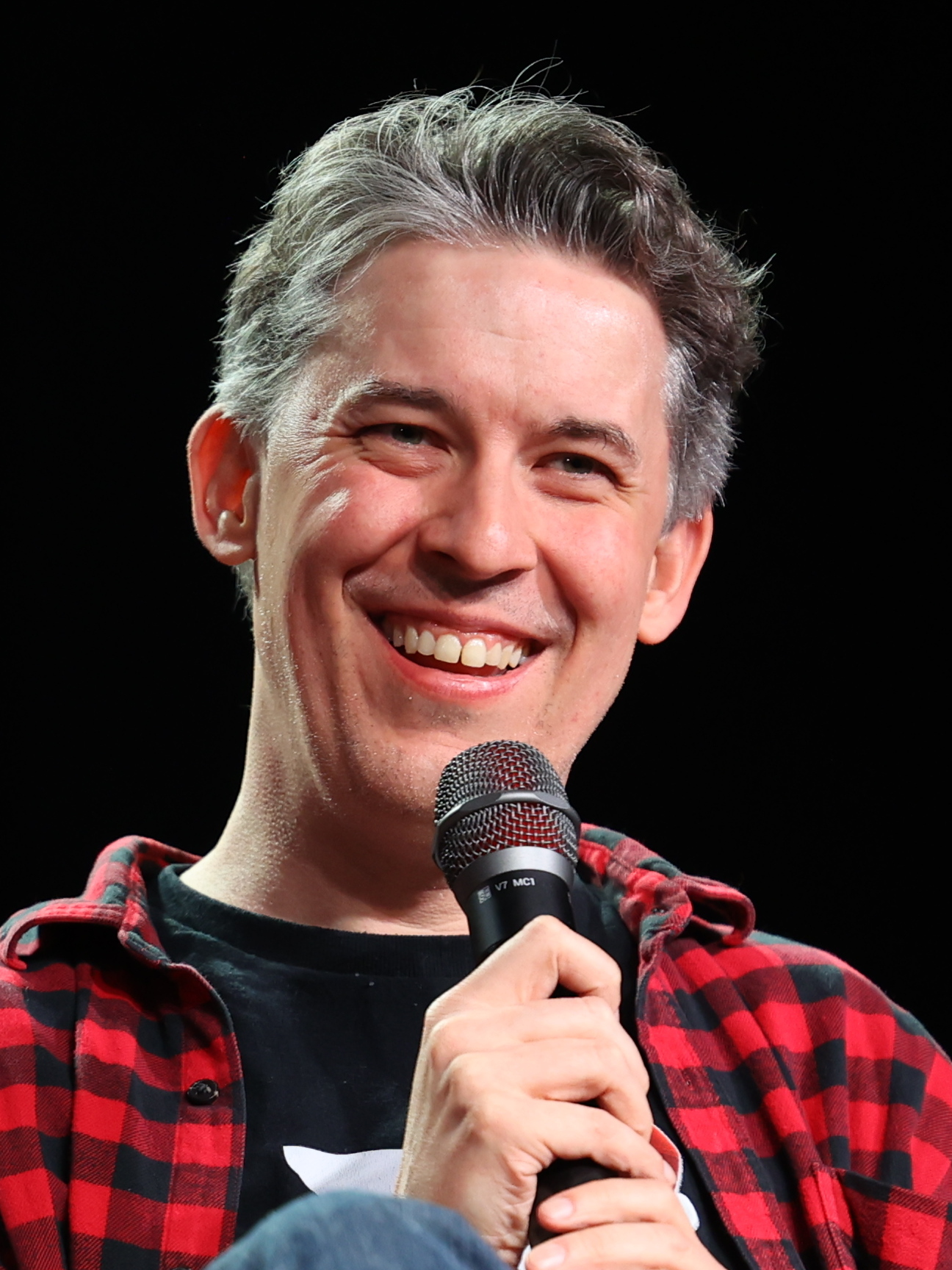
- Thornton in 2024 at Nightmare Weekend Miami
- Born: November 30, 1979 (age 46); Huntsville, Alabama, U.S.
- Education: University of Montevallo
- Occupation: Actor
- Years active: 2010–present
- Known for: Art the Clown
- Partner(s): Jada Christie (2025–present; engaged)

David Howard Thornton (born November 30, 1979) is an American actor. He is best known for his role as Art the Clown in the Terrifier film series.

== Early life and education ==
Thornton grew up in Huntsville, Alabama, and his parents were a NASA engineer and a special education teacher. His parents encouraged him to follow his goal of becoming an actor. As a child he first appeared on stage in a production by the local drama company Fantasy Playhouse Children's Theatre. He graduated from Huntsville's Grissom High School and received a degree in elementary education from the central Alabama liberal arts college the University of Montevallo.

== Career ==
=== Early work ===
Thornton was the understudy of actor Stefán Karl Stefánsson when they toured for Dr. Seuss' How the Grinch Stole Christmas! The Musical. Thornton has stated that Stefán Karl was a big influence on his physical comedy and acting style.

Thornton has lent his voice to various characters in film, anime, television and in video games. In 2011, he voiced Malvic, Volran, and Tengo in Two Worlds II: Pirates of the Flying Fortress. He later provided voices in 2013 as Anvil, Dr. Blotter and Baggy Miner in Ride to Hell: Retribution and as Shizoku, Metal Mutt and Toxitoad in Invizimals: The Lost Kingdom. In 2015, he provided additional voices for Miss Hokusai. From 2016 to 2017, he appeared as the Joker in the fan-made Web series Nightwing: Escalation and later went on to appear in Gotham, both projects that included characters by DC Comics.

=== Terrifier and career assurgency (2016–present) ===
In 2016, Thornton portrayed Art the Clown in Terrifier, a film that became a cult classic and for which he was nominated for a Fangoria Chainsaw Award for Best Supporting Actor and was the first feature-length appearance of the character in the Terrifier franchise. In 2022, Thornton reprised the role of Art the Clown in Terrifier 2. Terrifier 2 was well received by critics and a hit at the box office, grossing more than $15 million on a $250,000 budget. Also in 2022, Thornton starred as the titular character in a horror retelling of How the Grinch Stole Christmas!, in The Mean One.

Thornton reprised the role of Art the Clown in the 2023 Peacock series Bupkis and Terrifier 3 in October 2024. He appeared as Player 2 in the 2024 film Stream and as a Mickey Mouse horror pastiche in the 2025 film Screamboat. He is set to appear as Shark Bait Zombie in the upcoming film Night of the Living Dead II. Director Damien Leone is currently writing Terrifier 4 with Thornton expected once again to reprise his role as Art the Clown.

== Personal life ==
In a 2023 interview, Thornton spoke about discovering he is autistic as an adult. On April 18, 2026, Thornton became engaged to his girlfriend Jada Christie Eggen of Sioux Falls, SD after proposing at Huntsville Expo while dressed as Art the Clown.

== Filmography ==
=== Film ===
Year	Title	Role	Notes	Reference(s)
2015	Miss Hokusai	Additional Voices	Voice	
2016	Terrifier	Art the Clown		
2019	The Exigency	Bumbo	Voice	
2021	The Dark Offerings	Tim Cobb		
2022	Terrifier 2	Art the Clown		
2022	The Mean One	The Mean One		
2024	Stream	Player 2		
2024	Terrifier 3	Art the Clown		
2025	Jokers Wild	The Joker	Fan film Short film	
2025	Screamboat	Steamboat Willie		
2026	The Dead Place	The New Kid		
TBA	Night of the Living Dead II	Shark Bait Zombie		
TBA	Terrifier 4	Art the Clown		
TBA	Stream 2: Sudden Death	Player 2		
TBA	Hollywoods	Long Nail Nelly		
TBA	The Autopsy of Albert Kemper	Albert Kemper		

=== Television ===
Year	Title	Role	Notes	Reference(s)
2017	Gotham	Orderly	Episode: "A Dark Knight: The Blade's Path"	
2019	The Bravest Knight	Billy Goats / Newt	2 episodes Voice	
2020	Mistress Peace Theatre	Art the Clown / Himself	Episode: "Hallowday Special II"	
2021	Alma's Way	SFX Box	Episode: "No-Go Mofongo/Alma vs. Eddie"; Voice	
2023	Bupkis	Art the Clown	Episode: "Show Me the Way"	
2024	A Very Special Terrifier Christmas	Art the Clown		

=== Podcasts and web series ===
Year	Title	Role	Notes	Reference(s)
2016–2017	Nightwing: Escalation	The Joker	6 episodes	
2017	Powder Burns: An Original Western Audio Drama	Sam Locker	Episode: "Some Amount of Dignity"; Voice	

=== Video games ===
Year	Title	Role	Notes	Reference(s)
2011	Two Worlds II: Pirates of the Flying Fortress	Malvic / Volran / Tengo	Voice	
2013	Ride to Hell: Retribution	Anvil / Dr. Blotter / Baggy Miner	Voice	
2013	Invizimals: The Lost Kingdom	Shizoku / Metal Mutt / Toxitoad	Voice	

=== Music videos ===
Year	Band/Song	Role	Notes	Reference(s)
2024	Ice Nine Kills – "A Work of Art"	Art the Clown		

== Awards and nominations ==
Year	Award	Category	Nominated work	Result	Reference
2019	Fangoria Chainsaw Awards	Best Supporting Actor	Terrifier	Nominated	
