= Terrifier =

2016 film by Damien Leone

- Theatrical release poster
- Directed by: Damien Leone
- Written by: Damien Leone
- Produced by: Phil Falcone; Damien Leone; George Steuber
- Starring: Jenna Kanell; Samantha Scaffidi; Catherine Corcoran; David Howard Thornton
- Cinematography: George Steuber
- Edited by: Damien Leone
- Music by: Paul Wiley
- Production companies: Dread Central; Dark Age Cinema
- Distributed by: Epic Pictures Releasing
- Release dates: October 15, 2016 (Telluride Horror Show); March 15, 2018 (United States)
- Running time: 85 minutes
- Country: United States
- Language: English
- Budget: $35,000–$55,000
- Box office: $421,798

Terrifier is a 2016 American independent slasher film written, edited, co-produced, and directed by Damien Leone. The film stars Jenna Kanell, Samantha Scaffidi, Catherine Corcoran, and David Howard Thornton. The plot centers on partygoer Tara Heyes (Kanell) and her sister Victoria (Scaffidi), who become targets of the enigmatic serial killer known only as Art the Clown (Thornton) on Halloween night.

Leone had created the character of Art the Clown for his short film The 9th Circle (2008) and then created another short with Terrifier (2011). These shorts would generate interest for what became the anthology film All Hallows' Eve (2013), which contained both segments. With the film, Leone wrote it specifically as a means of showcasing the character of Art and his practical effects work. Leone has since expressed regret for leaving the protagonists underdeveloped.

Leone tried to raise funds for the Terrifier feature film with an Indiegogo campaign, which fell short of its goal. However, producer Phil Falcone helped contribute funds to help make the film in exchange for a producer credit. Mike Giannelli, who portrayed prior incarnations of Art, retired from acting before production began, and David Howard Thornton replaced him as Art.

Terrifier premiered at the Telluride Horror Show on October 15, 2016, and received a limited theatrical release in the United States on March 15, 2018, by Epic Pictures Releasing. The film received generally mixed reviews from critics, with praise directed towards the special effects and the portrayals of Kanell, Scaffidi and Thornton, while the writing was subject to criticism. Despite that, the film became a cult film, and would eventually generate a media franchise, with Terrifier 2, released on October 6, 2022 and Terrifier 3, released on October 11, 2024.

== Plot ==
A facially disfigured woman who survived a massacre the year before is interviewed for a TV talk show. Once off air, the host, Monica Brown, makes cruel comments about the woman's appearance while on the phone with her boyfriend in her dressing room, only for the woman to burst out of hiding and mutilate her.

On Halloween night of 2017 in Miles County, New York, two friends, Tara and Dawn, drunkenly leave a party and encounter Art the Clown, who follows them to a pizzeria. Art is kicked out by the restaurant's owner for smearing his feces over the bathroom walls. The girls discover that Dawn's car tire has been slashed; Tara calls her sister, Victoria, to pick them up. Art returns to the pizzeria and kills the owner and an employee.

While waiting, Tara asks a pest exterminator, Mike, to be let in to the vacant industrial building he is working in to use the restroom. There, she encounters the Cat Lady, a deluded squatter, who believes the doll she carries is her infant child. Art attacks Dawn and subdues Tara with a sedative.

Tara awakens, bound to a chair, to see Dawn suspended upside down wearing only panties. Art forces Tara to watch as he saws Dawn in half. Tara escapes; but Art shoots her to death, then attacks Mike. The Cat Lady discovers Art with her doll, and in a plea for the return of her "child", attempts to show motherly compassion by cradling him.

Victoria arrives and discovers Art, who has mutilated the Cat Lady and is wearing her scalp and breasts. Art chases Victoria and decapitates Mike's co-worker, Will. Victoria then finds Tara's corpse, just before Art attacks her with a makeshift cat o' nine tails. Mike wakes up and knocks Art unconscious. Mike and Victoria flee and call 911; but Art recovers and kills Mike, then hits Victoria with a pick-up truck. As Victoria lies unconscious, Art begins to eat her face. The police finally arrive, but Art shoots himself to death before he can be apprehended.

After the police discover Victoria is still alive, Art's body and those of his victims are taken to a morgue, where Art reanimates and attacks the medical examiner. One year later, Victoria is released from the hospital after rehabilitation; she is revealed to be the disfigured woman from the talk show.

== Cast ==
- Jenna Kanell as Tara Heyes
- Samantha Scaffidi as Victoria Heyes, Tara's sister
- David Howard Thornton as Art the Clown
- Catherine Corcoran as Dawn Emerson, Tara's best friend
- Pooya Mohseni as the Cat Lady
- Matt McAllister as Mike the Exterminator
- Katie Maguire as Monica Brown
- Gino Cafarelli as Steve
- Cory Duval as Seth Bolton the coroner
- Michael Leavy as Will the Exterminator
- Erick Zamora as Ramone

== Production ==
=== Development and writing ===
Writer and director Damien Leone made his directorial debut with the short film The 9th Circle (2008), which introduced the character Art the Clown. Leone did not intend for Art to be the lead villain in the short; however, the character was a breakout character with audiences, and he decided to bring Art back as the lead antagonist in the short film Terrifier (2011) and the anthology film All Hallows' Eve (2013), which incorporated the two shorts and featured a new Art wraparound story. After the anthology's release, Leone planned to make a feature-length film focusing solely on Art.

On his approach to making Terrifier, Leone stated, "I wanted to take familiar elements that we all embraced from American horror movies, combined with the graphic violence and atmosphere of Giallo films. Hopefully creating something fresh and exciting." Leone drew inspiration for the character of Art from several well-known slasher film characters that Leone was a fan of growing up, such as Jason Voorhees, Michael Myers, and Freddy Krueger. Leone states that he purposely made Art drastically different from Pennywise from It (1990), where Pennywise is "colorful" while Art is "black and white," as a means of differentiating the characters.

Despite being a feature film, Leone wrote a simple, straightforward narrative, initially focusing on two women, Tara Heyes and Dawn Emerson, whom Art stalks and kills on Halloween night. These characters were left underdeveloped as Leone focused on showcasing Art and his practical effects work. He expressed regret for his handling of the Victoria Heyes character: "My biggest regret is I wish I had fleshed out Samantha Scaffidi's character more, who was the sister, Victoria, the second heroine in the movie who gets deformed in the end."

=== Funding ===
In 2015, Leone launched a campaign on the crowdfunding website Indiegogo to finance Terrifier, a feature-length spin-off of All Hallows' Eve. After being notified of the Indiegogo campaign, filmmaker Phil Falcone provided the necessary funds for the project in exchange for a producer credit.

=== Casting ===
Jenna Kanell was cast as false protagonist Tara Heyes. Kanell originally auditioned for Leone's short film The 9th Circle (2008). While she did not get cast in the part, she kept in touch with Leone with plans of collaborating on a future project. Leone sent her the Terrifier script in 2015 and cast her based on her previous audition. Despite a lack of characterization, Kanell described Tara as being "scrappy". She performed all of her stunt work for Tara. Catherine Corcoran was cast for the supporting role of Dawn, and she had to film the most dangerous scene, the hacksaw death, in which Corcoran was hung upside down and shackled by her feet without a rig, leading to her being unable to even out her weight distribution. For safety, filming was done in 40-second increments, and the crew placed a platform beneath her between takes.

In The 9th Circle, the short film Terrifier, and All Hallows' Eve, Art was played by Mike Giannelli, who opted not to return to the role for the feature film due to not wanting to pursue any more major acting roles. Instead, the role of Art was recast to then unknown David Howard Thornton. Thornton was already familiar with All Hallows' Eve when he auditioned for the role of Art in Terrifier, and got cast after improvising a kill scene in mime.

== Release ==
Terrifier premiered at the Telluride Horror Show on October 15, 2016. It was later screened at the Horror Channel FrightFest on October 28, 2017, and was subsequently picked up by Epic Pictures Releasing for a limited theatrical release on March 15 and March 16, 2018. In April 2023, it was announced that Terrifier would be released theatrically in 853 theaters on July 19, 2023.

On October 27, 2025, actress Catherine Corcoran filed a federal lawsuit against the filmmakers accusing them of shortchanging her on promised residuals and using on-screen nudity without her consent. The lawsuit alleges that producer Phil Falcone and producer/director Damien Leone only paid her $8,341, which is a fraction of what she’s contractually owed. According to the lawsuit, Corcoran reached an agreement to work on the film for a very low per diem rate in exchange for 1% of the profits of the film and any future films in the series, as well as 1% of profits from merchandise related to the film. The lawsuit also accuses the filmmakers of sexual harassment, and of distributing sexually explicit material without her consent. A lawyer for Leone and Falcone said, “Damien and Phil deny the claims in the complaint and will vigorously defend this lawsuit.”

=== Home media ===
Terrifier was released on DVD and Blu-ray on March 27, 2018. The release features audio commentary from Damien Leone and David H. Thornton, behind-the-scenes footage, an interview with star Jenna Kanell, deleted scenes, collectible reversible cover art, and several other bonus features. The film was released on VHS on March 29, 2019, by Witter Entertainment.

== Reception ==
=== Box office ===
Terrifier grossed a total of $421,798. Terrifier & Terrifier 2 - Double Bill was released in the United Kingdom on September 27, 2024, and grossed $122,174.

=== Critical response ===
On the review aggregator website Rotten Tomatoes, 63% of 27 critics' reviews are positive, with an average rating of 6.0/10. The website's consensus reads: "All about the splashy kills, Terrifier artfully introduces the unpredictable massacrer mime Art, yet fails to carve an entertaining story worthy of his wrath."

John Higgins (Starburst) praised the performances of Kanell and Corcoran in that they "hold the attention." Higgins also praised the film's balance of suspense and gore. Anton Bitel of the British Film Institute described the film as a "subtext-free thrill-and-kill ride which openly advertises the sheer senselessness and gratuity of all its on-screen cat-and-mouse deaths by numbers" and "an unapologetically ‘pure’ genre entry, confronting – and amusing – us with all the sinister masked vicariousness of the Halloween spirit." Cody Hamman of Arrow in the Head awarded the film a score of 8 out of 10, calling it "a very simple film, providing 84 minutes of stalking and slashing that occurs largely within the confines of one location. Leone directs the hell out of that simple scenario, though, milking every possible bit of tension from each moment. It's a thrilling, brutal, gory '80s throwback that I recommend checking out, especially if you have a fondness for the same decade of films that this movie obviously holds in high regard."

Sol Harris of the magazine Starburst gave the film a score of 6 out of 10, writing: "Presented as something of a throwback to horror B-movies of the '80s, Terrifier has far more style - both visually and audibly - than the average film of this nature. It's a surprisingly nice looking film for a movie about a clown chopping people into pieces." Jeremy Aspinall of Radio Times praised the film, writing "But despite the unsparing gore, there's also plenty of atmosphere and a gnawing tension that's maintained all the way to the sequel-hinting climax." In a thesis by M. Keith Booker, he writes that rather than evolving the slasher film genre in different directions, Terrifier acts as a homage to the 1980s films of the subgenre but with better special effects and higher production values. Booker also observes similarities with Dawn's (Corcoran) hacksaw death scene and Freddy Krueger's pursuit of Nancy Thompson in the bathtub scene in A Nightmare on Elm Street (1984).

Amyana Bartley of FilmInquiry.com felt that the film's script lacked both clear protagonists and depth, writing, "Art the Clown has the potential to be a formidable, gruesome, franchise horror character, he just needs more seasoning and cultivation." Felix Vasquez Jr. of Cinema Crazed called it "fairly mediocre slasher fare", stating that the film lacked any creativity and tension while also criticizing its story line. Vasquez concluded his review by stating "As a film Terrifier aims high, but feels like a very disposable party favor you'll have forgotten once the credits roll."

== Accolades ==
The film received three Fangoria Chainsaw Award nominations: Best Limited Release, Best Supporting Actor (Thornton), and Best Makeup FX (Leone).

== Comic book ==
Between 2021 and 2022, a self-published three-issue limited comic book series adaptation of Terrifier was released by Damien Leone with illustrations by Steve McGinnis.

== Lawsuit ==
On October 27, 2025, actress Catherine Corcoran filed a federal lawsuit against the filmmakers, accusing them of shortchanging her on promised residuals and profit percentages. Corcoran reached an agreement with producer Phil Falcone and director Damien Leone to star in the film for a low per diem rate in exchange for one percent of profits from the film, any future films in the franchise, and merchandise related to the film. The lawsuit alleges that producer Phil Falcone and director Damien Leone have only paid her $8,341 to date, despite the franchise's immense success, specifically noting the usage of her image and likeness by Spirit Halloween, Hot Topic, and Halloween Horror Nights.

Corcoran's lawsuit also accuses the filmmakers of sexual harassment, including by distributing sexually explicit material without her consent. Under SAG-AFTRA rules, any nude or topless scenes must have prior authorization, which Corcoran said that she did not give before being forced to hang nude upside down for ten hours. During a lengthy and incorrectly performed silicone molding process, which resulted in Corcoran being painfully glued to a plywood sheet, the lawsuit alleges that Falcone took "numerous still photographs of Corcoran's nude body" without her consent. Leone and Falcone have denied all allegations.

In a response from horror podcaster Chelsea Rebecca, it was suggested that Corcoran had not intended for the lawsuit to become public.

== Sequels ==
In February 2019, Damien Leone stated that a sequel for Terrifier was in production, with the other sequel's script having already been written. The film went into production in October 2019 with Fuzz on the Lens Productions as co-producers along with Dark Age Cinema. The film was initially delayed during production of its final days of shooting due to the COVID-19 pandemic, but finally resumed in September 2020 and wrapped shooting in 2021. The film debuted at the Arrow Video FrightFest in London, England on August 29, 2022, before receiving a nationwide US cinema release on October 6, 2022, and was released to streaming platforms on November 11, 2022.

After the success of Terrifier 2, it was announced that Terrifier 3 was in the works and in May 2023, it was announced that the sequel was expected to begin filming in November or December 2023 although it eventually began in February 2024 and wrapped in April 2024. The film was released on October 11, 2024.
