= Terrifier 3 =

2024 film by Damien Leone

- Theatrical release poster
- Directed by: Damien Leone
- Written by: Damien Leone
- Produced by: Damien Leone; Phil Falcone; Michael Leavy; George Steuber; Jason Leavy; Steven Della Salla
- Starring: David Howard Thornton; Lauren LaVera; Elliott Fullam; Samantha Scaffidi
- Cinematography: George Steuber
- Edited by: Damien Leone
- Music by: Paul Wiley
- Production companies: Dark Age Cinema; The Coven; Fuzz on the Lens Productions
- Distributed by: Cineverse (Note: Cineverse released with their Bloody Disgusting and Screambox labels.); Iconic Events Releasing
- Release dates: September 19, 2024 (Fantastic Fest); October 11, 2024 (United States)
- Running time: 125 minutes
- Country: United States
- Language: English
- Budget: $2 million
- Box office: $98.4 million

Terrifier 3 is a 2024 American independent supernatural slasher film written, directed, co-produced and edited by Damien Leone. It is the sequel to Terrifier 2 (2022) and the third installment in the Terrifier film series. The film stars David Howard Thornton, Lauren LaVera, Elliott Fullam, and Samantha Scaffidi. On the days leading up to Christmas, Sienna Shaw attempts to rebuild her life, while pursued by Art the Clown alongside his new accomplice, a possessed Victoria Heyes.

Following the critical and commercial success of Terrifier 2, Leone began writing for the third film with plans for an overarching narrative. Leone wanted to feature Victoria more prominently, as he regretted leaving the character underdeveloped in the first film. Principal photography began in February 2024 on a $2 million budget, and wrapped that April.

Terrifier 3 premiered at Fantastic Fest on September 19, 2024, and was theatrically released in the United States on October 11, by Cineverse and Iconic Events Releasing. The film received generally positive reviews from critics and was a commercial success, grossing $98.4 million, becoming the highest-grossing unrated film of all time, Cineverse's highest-grossing film, and the highest-grossing film of the franchise. A fourth film, Terrifier 4, is in development.

== Plot ==
After being beheaded by Sienna Shaw, (Note: As depicted in Terrifier 2 (2022).) Art the Clown's decapitated body reanimates inside the Terrifier haunted house, strangles and decapitates a police officer responding to the incident before making its way to the asylum where survivor Victoria Heyes, now possessed by the Little Pale Girl, has just given birth to Art's head. Art reattaches his head to his body shortly after he and Victoria kill a nurse and a guard before entering an abandoned house and going into hibernation. There, Victoria is forced to commit suicide so that the Little Pale Girl can completely possess her body.

Five years later, Sienna is released from a mental health center to stay with her aunt Jess, her uncle Greg, and her cousin Gabbie, who idolizes Sienna but has no knowledge of the events she endured. Sienna is suffering from survivor's guilt and experiences PTSD induced hallucinations of deceased people who Art killed, including that of her best friend Brooke, whose death she feels responsible for. She struggles to reconnect with her younger brother Jonathan, who is now in college.

Art and Victoria are woken by two demolition workers; they kill the workers. Art then shoots two men dead, kills a Santa Claus impersonator at a bar using liquid nitrogen and takes his Santa costume. At 3 a.m., he invades the house of an innocent family and brutally butchers them with an axe. In the morning, Art poses as a mall Santa and uses explosives disguised as presents to kill several people, many of them children. Sienna thinks she sees Art at the mall in disguise before the explosion but does not tell her family out of fear that they will not believe her.

Sienna visits Jonathan at his university, where she meets Jonathan's roommate Cole and his girlfriend Mia, who hosts a true crime podcast. Mia pressures Sienna and Jonathan to participate in an interview about the Miles County Massacre, but Sienna lashes out. Sienna confesses to Jonathan that she thinks Art is still alive, and she shows Jonathan a letter that he wrote to her while she was in the psychiatric hospital, which states that demons can come into their world via the possession of recently deceased evil people, like serial killers. She tells Jonathan that she plans to return to the Terrifier carnival to retrieve their father's sword. Art arrives at the university and kills Mia and Cole with a chainsaw while they are having sex in the shower. Sienna learns about the mall killings on the news and panics, commanding Jonathan to return home from college and warning the family that they are not safe. Greg leaves to collect Jonathan while Sienna falls asleep. She dreams of her father and of the angels crafting the armor from her warrior costume that he drew for her. Sienna awakens to hear Jess and Greg downstairs discussing what they should do about her worsening condition. When she walks into the dining room, Sienna instead finds Art and Victoria decorating Greg's decapitated and eviscerated body pinned to the wall. Sienna tries to escape but is incapacitated by Art with a mallet.

Sienna regains consciousness and finds herself and Jess tied to chairs with their mouths taped shut. Victoria shows them a skinless head being consumed by rats, telling Jess that it is Gabbie's head. Art and Victoria kill Jess by hammering a tube into her throat, forcing rats down it and slitting her throat. Art enters with Gabbie as a hostage, and Victoria tells Sienna that the head is actually Jonathan's head. Victoria places a crown of thorns on Sienna's head and tries to possess her, but she resists. Before Sienna and Gabbie could be sentenced to death, the latter pleads for Sienna to open a present of hers, which, unbeknownst to Victoria, contains Sienna's sword. Art smashes both of Sienna's hands then cuts her bonds so she can open up her present. Sienna then uses the sword to cut Art's throat and decapitate Victoria. As Art and Sienna battle each other, Victoria's body disintegrates and turns into a pool of demonic blood that burns through the floor and opens a portal to Hell, putting Gabbie's life in danger. Despite Sienna's efforts, Gabbie falls into the abyss with the sword. Art seizes his opportunity to escape through a window, whilst Sienna looks down at her wounded hands as they heal, vowing to find and rescue Gabbie.

A bloodied Art the Clown, having escaped, boards a city bus with a woman reading a book titled The 9th Circle. (Note: The title of the first short film to depict Art the Clown)

== Cast ==
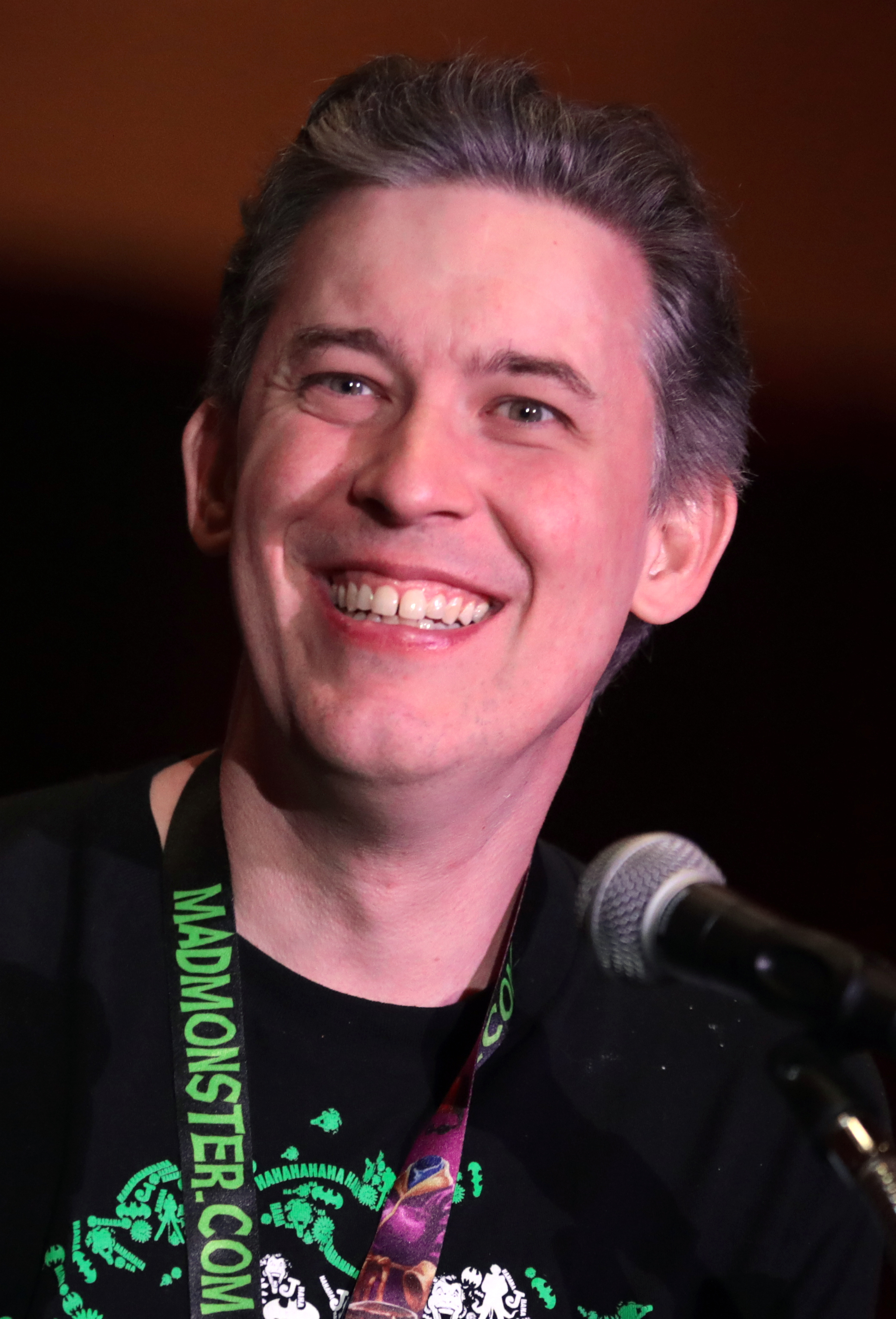
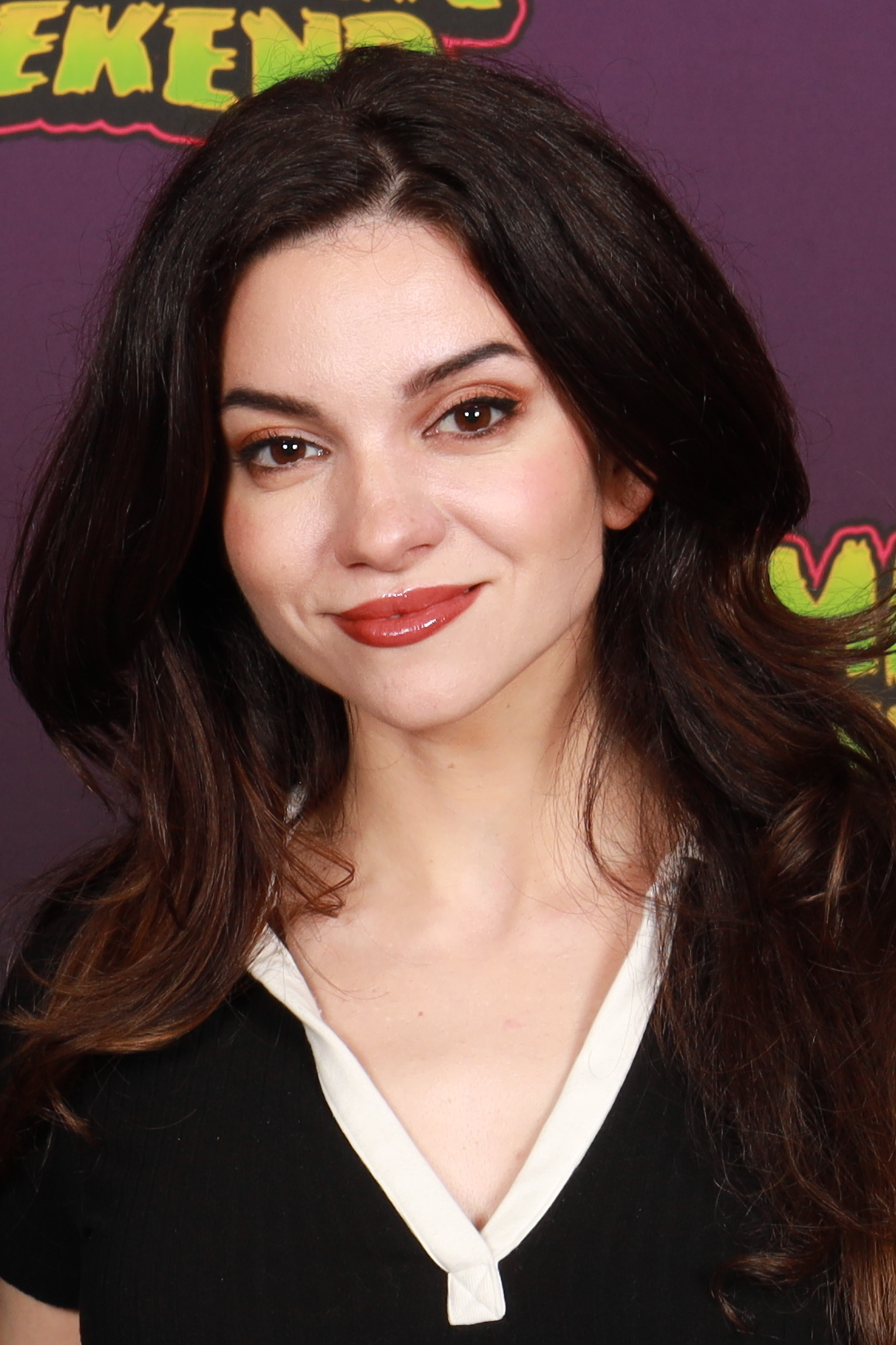
David Howard Thornton (pictured in 2023) and Lauren LaVera (pictured in 2024)
- David Howard Thornton as Art the Clown
- Lauren LaVera as Sienna Shaw, Jonathan's older sister and the one who decapitated Art in the previous film and now is released from a mental health center
  - Luciana Elisa Quiñonez as young Sienna
- Elliott Fullam as Jonathan Shaw, Sienna's younger brother who is now in college and trying to move on with life after the events that he had experienced
- Samantha Scaffidi as Victoria Heyes, the sole survivor of the events of the first film and the older sister of Art's victim, Tara Heyes, who becomes possessed by the Little Pale Girl and acts as Art's partner-in-crime
- Margaret Anne Florence as Jess Shaw, Greg's wife, Gabbie's mother and Sienna and Jonathan's aunt who is the older sister of their mother Barbara
- Bryce Johnson as Greg Shaw, Jess's husband, Gabbie's father and uncle of Sienna and Jonathan
- Antonella Rose as Gabbie Shaw, Jess and Greg's daughter and Sienna and Jonathan's cousin who idolizes Sienna
- Chris Jericho as Adam Burke, a security guard in the Miles County Psychiatric Hospital
- Daniel Roebuck as Charles Johnson, an old man who is a Santa Claus impersonator
- Tom Savini as a bystander
- Jason Patric as Michael Shaw, Sienna and Jonathan's father who is an artist that died from a brain tumor
- Krsy Fox as Jennifer
- Alexa Blair Robertson as Mia, Cole's girlfriend and a true crime enthusiast obsessed with the Miles County Massacre
- Mason Mecartea as Cole, Jonathan's dorm mate
- Stephen Cofield Jr. as Officer Evans
- Clint Howard as Smokey
- Annie Lederman as Graven Image co-host
- Bradley Stryker as Eddie
- Jon Abrahams as Dennis
- Jen Ayer Drake as Woman on Bus

== Production ==
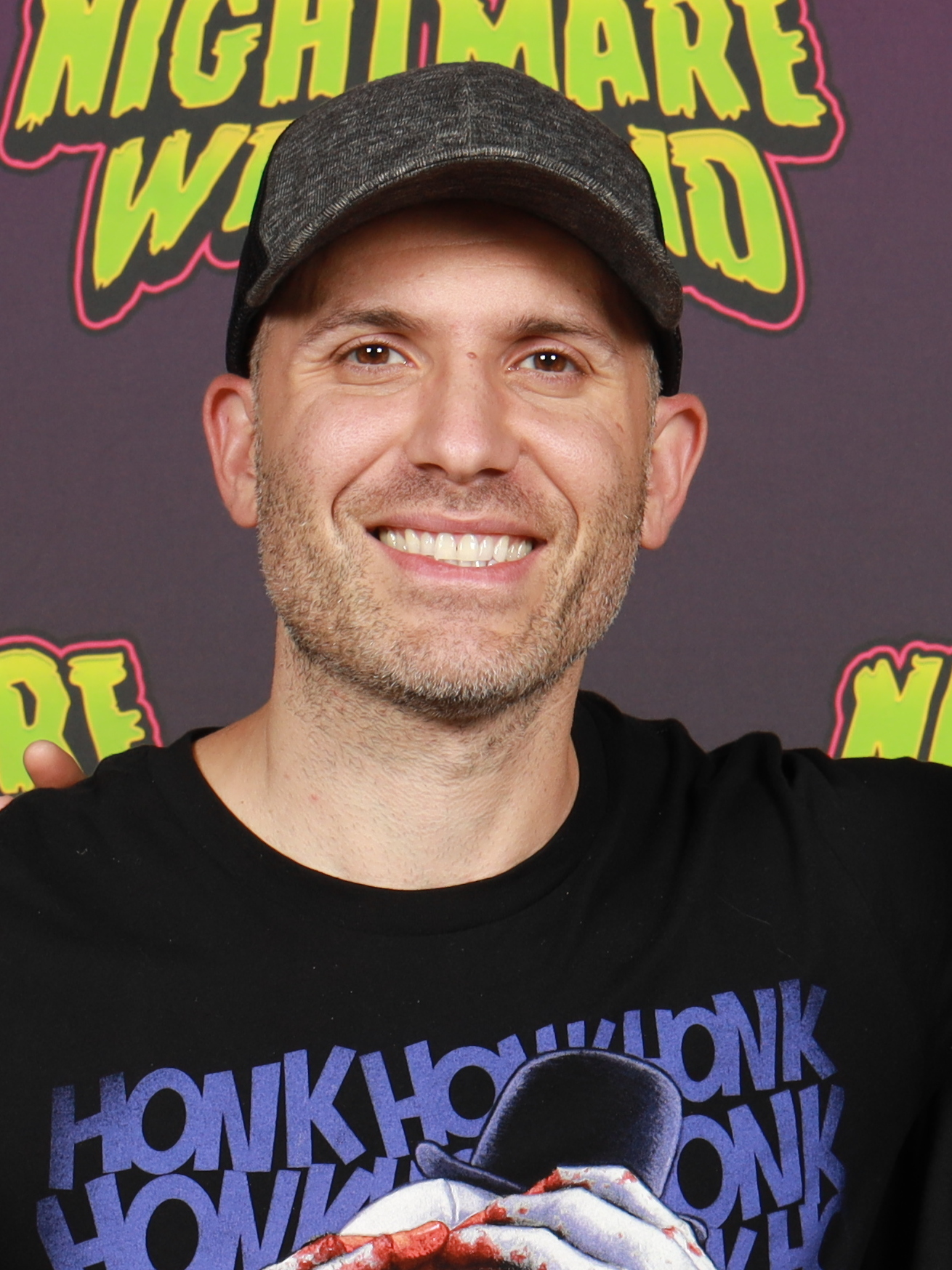
Terrifier franchise creator and director Damien Leone

This film featured the character of Victoria Heyes, the heroine turned villainess of Terrifier (2016), in a much more prominent role compared to the 2016 film and its 2022 sequel—with Damien Leone's biggest regret with the first film being leaving her underdeveloped. The original ending of Terrifier 2 set up Victoria's demise in the opening of this film, but Leone deemed it to be too similar to the concept of Malignant (2021). While conceptualizing the birthing scene, he decided he wanted to keep Victoria alive and give her significant character development, as he enjoyed working with Samantha Scaffidi.

In December 2023, it was confirmed that Chris Jericho was set to appear in Terrifier 3. In April 2024, it was confirmed that Daniel Roebuck was set to appear as Santa Claus in Terrifier 3. In May 2024, it was announced that Tom Savini was set to appear in Terrifier 3. In June 2024, it was announced that Jason Patric was set to appear in Terrifier 3. In July 2024, it was announced that Antonella Rose, Krsy Fox, Clint Howard, and Jon Abrahams were set to appear in Terrifier 3.

In May 2023, it was announced that Terrifier 3 was expected to begin filming in November or December 2023. Principal photography began in February 2024 and wrapped in April 2024, with additional scenes completed in New York until early/mid June. Leone chose to shoot the film using Panavision anamorphic lenses with the intention of making the film look like a "vintage John Carpenter movie". The film cost $2 million to produce, up from its predecessor's $250,000 budget; Variety described the budget as "still wildly low by Hollywood standards".

== Release ==
Terrifier 3 was theatrically released in the United States on October 11, 2024, by Cineverse, who acquired distribution rights in June 2023, setting it for a wide release in collaboration with Iconic Events Releasing, with an exclusive streaming debut on the former's Screambox service. It was originally scheduled for October 25, but was moved forward to its new date in May 2024. The film premiered on opening night at the 2024 Fantastic Fest on September 19. In select AMC Theatres, the film played as a double feature with Terrifier 2, followed by a music video presentation of the film's official song "A Work of Art" by Ice Nine Kills, featuring System of a Down bassist Shavo Odadjian, which was released as a single in tandem with the film's theatrical release on October 11.

Cineverse spent under $5 million to acquire and market the film; advertising costs were $500,000 (as the film was largely marketed to Cineverse's Bloody Disgusting fanbase and 80 million streaming subscribers across 30 channels) and additional acquisition costs were covered by a loan of at most $3.67 million, with the lender receiving 15% of royalties, capped at $6.4 million. The film forwent submission for a Motion Picture Association rating to avoid an NC-17 rating.

=== Home media ===
Terrifier 3 was released digitally on November 26, 2024. In Australia, the film is set to be released by Umbrella Entertainment in a 4-film box set, alongside All Hallows' Eve, Terrifier, and Terrifier 2 on Ultra HD Blu-ray, Blu-ray, DVD and VHS from January 31, 2025. The film grossed $3.9 million in home sales.

== Reception ==
=== Box office ===
Terrifier 3 grossed $54 million in the United States and Canada, and $44.4 million in other territories, for a worldwide total of $98.4 million.

In the United States and Canada, Terrifier 3 was projected to gross $10–11 million from 2,514 theaters in its opening weekend, with one estimate by Boxoffice Pro at $12–18 million. The film made $8.2 million on its first day (including $2.6 million from Thursday night previews). It debuted to $18.9 million, topping the box office. As an indie film, Terrifier 3 notably placed ahead of DC Comics holdover Joker: Folie à Deux. Theater chains treated the unrated film as an R-rated film, turning down attendees 17 or younger if unaccompanied by a parent or guardian; two distribution sources speculated that more people saw the film than reported, theorizing that a "noticeable bump" in the earnings for The Wild Robot that weekend was the result of teenagers buying tickets to The Wild Robot and then sneaking into screenings of Terrifier 3. The trend continued into the film's first Monday, during which it earned $2.6 million, bringing its four-day total to $21.5 million. In its second weekend, the film made $9.3 million (a drop of 51%), finishing in third. The film then made $4.8 million its third weekend, finishing in sixth.

In France, the film opened number one box office on its first day with 45,000 admissions, more than other horror films like Saw X (35,000) and Smile (33,000). In Poland, Terrifier 3 sold nearly 140,000 tickets during its opening weekend. In Mexico, the film grossed $1.5 million on its opening weekend, despite being a rare D-rated film by the RTC, an equivalent to a NC-17 rated film in that country.

=== Critical response ===
On the review aggregator website Rotten Tomatoes, 78% of 127 critics' reviews are positive, with an average rating of 6.4/10. The website's consensus reads: "Taking an axe to yuletide cheer and everything else in its path, Terrifier 3 is a bloody fantastic stocking stuffer for the holiday season." Metacritic, which uses a weighted average, assigned the film a score of 62 out of 100, based on 19 critics, indicating "generally favorable" reviews. Audiences polled by CinemaScore gave the film an average grade of "B" on an A+ to F scale, while those surveyed by PostTrak gave it a 76% overall positive score, with 59% saying they would definitely recommend it.

Writing for Slant Magazine, Rocco T. Thompson described the storyline as being "half-formed" but praised the leading performances and the practical effects. Thompson highlighted Scaffidi's performance in particular: "it's the surprisingly spooky Victoria Heyes who emerges as the film's villain MVP, what with the overwhelming Art often playing second banana in their scenes together. Through it all, Scaffidi exudes a chilling sense of evil from beneath pounds of prosthetics." Thompson also noted that LaVera brought "emotional intensity to the narrative" in her portrayal. In a review for The Austin Chronicle, Richard Whittaker highlighted the film's continued worldbuilding, the transgressiveness of the Art character, and Victoria's expanded importance as a villain in the series. Similarly, Matthew Jackson of The A. V. Club praised the script and the performances of Thornton and LaVera. Jackson stated that LaVera "cements herself as one of horror's brightest new stars with her second time out as Sienna Shaw." In a positive review for IndieWire, Alison Foreman highlighted the script as "confident and comfortable". She praised the development of both Sienna and Victoria, describing the latter as Leone's "secret weapon". Foreman states that the film gives the two characters "plenty of story to carry".

=== International responses ===
France's Classification Committee banned viewers under the age of 18 from seeing the film, the first time such a ban had been issued since the release of Saw III in 2006. There were reports of audiences vomiting and leaving theatres after watching the film's opening scene in the United Kingdom. Two people reportedly passed out during a screening of the film in Australia.

== Novelization ==
A novelization of Terrifier 3 by Tim Waggoner was released by Bloody Press on December 2, 2025.

== Sequel ==
In 2023, Damien Leone spoke about plans for a potential Terrifier 4. In September 2024, Leone officially confirmed that Terrifier 4 is in development. Although originally intended to be the conclusion of the franchise, in October 2024, Leone clarified his comments of Terrifier 4 likely being the final film, stating the announcement was a bit "premature" and was uncertain whether the conclusion of the franchise would span over one or two more films. On January 29, 2025, Damien Leone posted on his social media that Terrifier 4 will mark the end of the franchise and fans would learn more about Art's backstory and activities before the first film. In May 2025, Leone, while attending Texas Frightmare Weekend, gave an update on the status of the fourth film, saying, "I know this word gets used a lot, but it's going to be epic. It's not going to disappoint. You're going to get Art's backstory in the first 15 minutes of the movie."

David Howard Thornton discussed Terrifier 4 in October 2025, saying, “I'm very excited, but I don't know a whole lot, because this time around Damien has been keeping everything very close to his vest about what's happening in the script. Lauren [Lavera], Samantha [Scaffidi], and I, in the past when he's been writing the other scripts, he's been consulting us the whole entire time, running ideas by us. This time, he's been pretty much silent. He just goes, 'Oh yeah, you're gonna love the origin story, Dave. You're gonna love how we do it.' And he said also, 'The finale is bat-shit insane. You're gonna have a lot of fun with that.' Other than that, I don't know, but that makes me excited." Thornton also gave his input on if this will truly be the finale of the franchise by saying, "I feel like this might be the finale of this story arc that [Leone]'s going with for right now and might give it a rest for a few years and might return later on to it. I have no idea, but I'm excited nonetheless. I have so much faith in him."

On May 8, 2026, Leone stated on his Instagram that Terrifier 4 would be set around New Year's Eve.
