= Damien Leone =

American film director, special effects artist, writer and producer

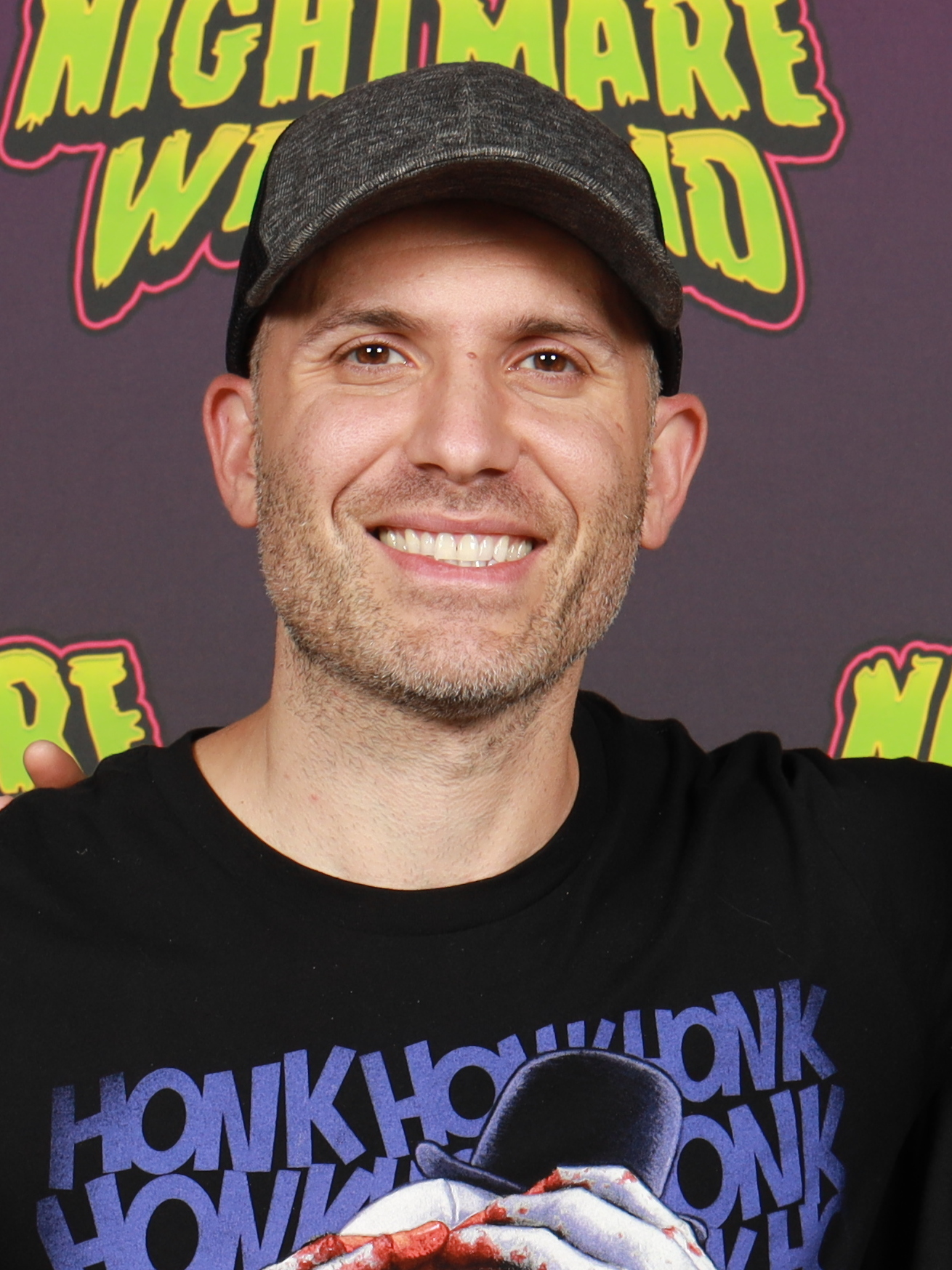
- Leone in 2024
- Born: Staten Island, New York City, U.S.
- Occupations: Filmmaker, film editor, special effects artist
- Years active: 2005–present
- Known for: Terrifier franchise

Damien Leone is an American filmmaker, film editor, and special effects artist. He is best known for creating the character Art the Clown and for writing and directing the films in the Terrifier franchise, including All Hallows' Eve (2013), Terrifier (2016), Terrifier 2 (2022), and Terrifier 3 (2024).

== Early life ==
Leone grew up in the Great Kills neighborhood of Staten Island, New York. His mother, a horror film enthusiast, introduced him to the genre at a young age and named him after the character Damien Thorn from the 1976 film The Omen.

He became interested in practical special effects after watching the 1986 documentary Scream Greats: Tom Savini, Master of Special Effects. Around age 12, he began experimenting with makeup effects kits, latex, and props, often practicing on friends. Leone has described himself as largely self-taught, having never attended film school and learning practical effects and filmmaking techniques through experimentation and studying films.

== Career ==
Leone’s earliest film credit was as a special effects artist on the independent feature Love (2005).

In 2008, he wrote, directed, produced, and handled effects for the short film The 9th Circle, which introduced Art the Clown in a supporting role. He followed it with the short Terrifier (2011), centering the character as the antagonist. Both shorts were incorporated into the anthology feature All Hallows' Eve (2013), which Leone wrote, directed, produced, edited, and supervised effects for. He later produced the anthology sequel All Hallows' Eve 2 (2015) and directed the standalone feature Frankenstein vs. The Mummy (2015).

In 2016, Leone wrote, directed, produced, edited, and created the practical effects for the feature-length Terrifier. The film received a limited theatrical release and later developed a cult following. Leone was nominated for a Fangoria Chainsaw Award for Best Makeup FX for his work on the film.

Leone again wrote, directed, produced, edited, and effects-supervised Terrifier 2 (2022). Made for a reported budget of $250,000, it grossed more than $15 million worldwide and received generally favorable reviews. The film also drew media attention for reports of audience members fainting or becoming nauseated during screenings. Leone won the Fangoria Chainsaw Award for Best Makeup FX for the film.

Leone next wrote, directed, produced, edited, and provided effects for Terrifier 3 (2024). The film was made on a reported budget of approximately $2 million and grossed over $90 million worldwide, becoming the highest-grossing entry in the franchise. The same year, he co-produced and contributed special effects to the film Stream.

As of 2025–2026, Terrifier 4 is in development; Leone has indicated it could conclude the main franchise storyline. He has also been linked to other projects outside the series.

Throughout his career, Leone has emphasized practical special effects, frequently creating the majority of the gore and prosthetics himself or with a small team (notably producer Phil Falcone). This approach has allowed relatively high production values on low budgets while retaining creative control.

== Personal life ==
Leone has spoken in interviews about growing up in a household that encouraged his interest in horror. His mother introduced him to films such as Jaws and classic slashers at a young age. She has expressed pride in his career while finding the extreme content of the later Terrifier films difficult to watch.

He has described being raised primarily by women and has addressed criticisms of misogyny in his work by stating that he intends audiences to root for his female protagonists. Leone remains based in the Staten Island area. Despite the graphic violence in his films, Leone has said he is uncomfortable with the sight of real blood.

== Legal issues ==
In October 2025, actress Catherine Corcoran, who appeared in the first Terrifier film, filed a federal lawsuit against Leone and producer Phil Falcone. The complaint alleged shortchanging on promised residuals and the use of on-screen nudity without consent. A lawyer representing Leone and Falcone stated that they "deny the claims in the complaint and will vigorously defend this lawsuit."

== Filmography ==
Year	Film	Director	Writer	Producer	Editor	Makeup/Special Effects	Notes	References
2005	Love	No	No	No	No	Yes		
2008	The 9th Circle	Yes	Yes	Yes	No	Yes	Short film, first appearance of Art the Clown	
2011	Terrifier	Yes	Yes	Yes	Yes	Yes	Short film	
2013	All Hallows' Eve	Yes	Yes	Yes	Yes	Yes	Anthology film	
2015	Frankenstein vs. The Mummy	Yes	Yes	No	Yes	Yes		
2015	Laugh Killer Laugh	No	No	No	No	Yes		
2015	All Hallows' Eve 2	No	No	Yes	No	No	Anthology film	
2016	Terrifier	Yes	Yes	Yes	Yes	Yes		
2022	Terrifier 2	Yes	Yes	Yes	Yes	Yes		
2024	Stream	No	No	Yes	No	Yes		
2024	Terrifier 3	Yes	Yes	Yes	Yes	Yes		

== Awards and nominations ==
Year	Award	Category	Work	Result	Ref.
2011	ShockerFest	Audience Choice Award	Terrifier	Won	
2012	Louisville Fright Night Film Fest	Best "Grindhouse" Film	Terrifier	Won	
2015	Rondo Hatton Classic Horror Awards	Best Independent Film	Frankenstein vs. The Mummy	Nominated	
2019	Fangoria Chainsaw Awards	Best Limited Release	Terrifier	Nominated	
2019	Fangoria Chainsaw Awards	Best Makeup FX	Terrifier	Nominated	
2022	Greater Western New York Film Critics Association Awards	Breakthrough Director	Terrifier 2	Nominated	
2023	Fangoria Chainsaw Awards	Best Makeup FX	Terrifier 2	Won	
