= Barry S. Fogel =

American neuropsychiatrist (born 1952)

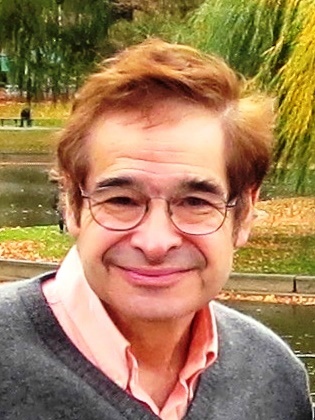
- Born: January 23, 1952 (age 74); San Francisco, California
- Occupation: Academic physician
- Title: Professor of Psychiatry, Part-time, Harvard Medical School
- Spouse(s): Xiaoling Jiang, Ph.D.

Academic background
- Education: UCSF School of Medicine, MIT Sloan School of Management, Princeton, UC Berkeley, residencies at Harvard-Longwood (neurology) and Stanford (psychiatry)
- Academic advisors: Norman Geschwind, Stewart Agras, Sidney Katz

Academic work
- Discipline: Neuropsychiatry and behavioral neurology
- Institutions: Brigham and Women's Hospital, Dana-Farber Cancer Institute

Barry S. Fogel (born 1952) is an American neuropsychiatrist, behavioral neurologist, medical writer, medical educator and inventor. He is the senior author of a standard text in neuropsychiatry and medical psychiatry, and a founder of the American Neuropsychiatric Association and the International Neuropsychiatric Association.

== Early life ==
Barry S. Fogel was born in San Francisco and grew up in Los Angeles, California. His father Daniel Fogel (1923-1991) was a prominent trial lawyer and personal attorney for Los Angeles Mayor Tom Bradley; his brother Jeremy Fogel is a retired Federal Judge from the Northern District of California, and from 2011-2018 Director of the Federal Judicial Center, and from 2018 Director of the Berkeley Judicial Institute at the University of California.

Dr. Fogel was a mathematical prodigy, starting college at UCLA at age 14, attending Princeton University the following year, and entering the PhD program in mathematics at UC Berkeley at age 16. While working on a dissertation related to the mathematical theory of neural networks he reached a decision to become a clinical neuroscientist.

== Education and credentials ==
Fogel received his M.D. degree in 1976 from the UCSF School of Medicine. He also holds a master's degree from the MIT Sloan School of Management and M.A. and C.Phil. degrees in mathematics from the University of California, Berkeley. He was a resident in neurology in the Harvard-Longwood Neurological Training Program and a resident in psychiatry at Stanford University.

He is certified by the American Board of Psychiatry and Neurology in neurology and psychiatry and by the United Council for Neurologic Subspecialties in behavioral neurology and neuropsychiatry.

== Career ==
From 1981 to 1996 Fogel served on the faculty of the Brown University School of Medicine, first as the founding director of the program in medical psychiatry at Rhode Island Hospital, and then as the Associate Director of the Brown Center for Gerontology and Health Care Research. He directed medical student education in psychiatry at Brown and mentored several medical students who became prominent psychiatrists, including Sally Satel and Scott Haltzman. While at Brown University he served as an advisor on mental health policy to U.S. Senator John Chafee (R-RI).

While at Brown he began a long collaboration with the late Dr. Alan Stoudemire of Emory University School of Medicine, co-editing five volumes on medical psychiatry, culminating in the publication in 1993 of Psychiatric Care of the Medical Patient by Oxford University Press. That work received many positive reviews and is a "standard reference in medical psychiatry," addressing "the interface of psychiatry with medicine and surgery." The book's third edition was published in 2015.

In 1988 Fogel co-founded the American Neuropsychiatric Association (ANPA) with Randolph B. Schiffer, M.D., and served as its first president.

In 1996 Fogel was a founder of the International Neuropsychiatric Association.

Fogel is currently Professor of Psychiatry, Part-time at Harvard Medical School and a physician at the Brigham and Women’s Hospital based at its Center for Brain-Mind Medicine. He is also on the staff of the Dana-Farber Cancer Institute. His academic role at Harvard includes the mentoring of postdoctoral fellows and junior faculty, several of whom have become leaders in behavioral neurology and neuropsychiatry.

In 1995, together with three other health service researchers, he co-founded PointRight Inc., a healthcare data analytics company focused on decision support for post-acute care. He was its principal scientist until December 2020, when the company was acquired. He was the Chief Executive Officer and co-founder of Synchroneuron, Inc., a CNS pharmaceutical startup (2011 and 2016), formed to develop novel treatments for movement disorders, combat-related post-traumatic stress disorder, and tinnitus. Since 2018 he has been on the Scientific Advisory Board of 4D Path, a digital pathology startup.

He also is an inventor and holds numerous U.S. and international patents involving pharmaceuticals, medical devices and computer software.

== Selected honors ==
American Neuropsychiatric Association Gary J. Tucker Award for Lifetime Achievement in Neuropsychiatry, 2019

Nominator, Nobel Prize in Physiology or Medicine, 2006 and 2011 (appointed by selection committee)

American Psychiatric Association Distinguished Fellow

== Personal life ==
Fogel lives in Lexington, Massachusetts with his wife Xiaoling and son William. His daughter Susanna Fogel is a film director and screenwriter known for The Flight Attendant (2020), Booksmart (2019), The Spy Who Dumped Me (2018), Chasing Life (2014–15) and Life Partners (2014).

== Selected publications ==
Dr. Fogel's publications on neuropsychiatry include the following:

- Fogel, BS; Jiang, X, eds. (2025). Seeing Depression Through a Cultural Lens. New York: Oxford University Press. ISBN 9780190850074.
- Fogel, BS; Greenberg, DB, eds. (2015). Psychiatric Care of the Medical Patient, third edition. New York: Oxford University Press. ISBN 978-0-190-22629-9.
- Fogel, BS (2105)"Capacity, Competency, and Consent in Medical Psychiatry," (2015)in Fogel, BS, Greenberg, D (eds.), Psychiatric Care of the Medical Patient, Oxford University Press, pp. 1619–1642.
- Fogel, BS (2014) "Mental Competence and Legal Issues in Medical Psychiatry," in Dickerson, BC, and Atri, A (eds.), Dementia, Oxford University Press, pp. 622–638.
- Schiffer, RB; Rao, SM; Fogel, BS, eds. (2003). Neuropsychiatry: A Comprehensive Textbook, second edition. Philadelphia: Lippincott Williams and Wilkins. ISBN 978-0-781-72655-9.
- Fogel, BS; Shellow, R, eds. (1995). Practice Guideline for the Psychiatric Evaluation of Adults. Washington, DC: American Psychiatric Press Inc.
- Stoudemire, A; Fogel, BS, eds. (1991–1995). Medical-Psychiatric Practice, Volumes 1, 2, and 3. Washington, DC: American Psychiatric Press Inc. ISBN 978-0-880-48425-1.
- Fogel, BS; Furino, A (1990). Gottlieb, Gary (ed.). Mental Health Policy for Older Americans: Protecting Minds at Risk. Washington, DC: American Psychiatric Press Inc. ISBN 978-0-880-48320-9.
- Fogel, BS; Colenda, C; deFigueiredo, JM, eds. (1993). State Mental Hospitals and the Elderly: A Task Force Report of the American Psychiatric Association. Washington, DC: American Psychiatric Association.
