= British Neuropsychiatry Association =

The British Neuropsychiatry Association (BNPA) is a professional organisation in the United Kingdom focused on the field of neuropsychiatry, which encompasses the clinical and scientific study of disorders at the interface of neurology, psychiatry, and neuropsychology.

The British Neuropsychiatry Association was founded in 1987 at the suggestion of Dr Jonathan Bird. Among its founding members were key figures in the development of neuropsychiatry as a distinct subspecialty in the UK. The first chairman was William Alwyn Lishman who later became honorary life president of the organisation.

The British Neuropsychiatry Association hosts an annual conference, typically in London, which features invited lectures, scientific presentations, and case discussions. These meetings are intended to disseminate research findings and discuss clinical developments in areas such as dementia, epilepsy, movement disorders, functional neurological disorders, and traumatic brain injury. The conference proceedings are published annually in the Journal of Neurology, Neurosurgery and Psychiatry and joint meetings have previously been held with the American Neuropsychiatric Association and the Faculty of Neuropsychiatry at the Royal College of Psychiatrists.

UK domestic membership is restricted to medical practitioners working in clinical or experimental fields related to psychiatry, neurology, psychology or neuroscience; postgraduate psychologists working in clinical or experimental fields related to psychiatry or neurology; postgraduate laboratory workers in the neurosciences; allied health workers in psychiatry, neurology, or neuropsychiatry. The British Neuropsychiatry Association does not regulate clinical practice or training. It is a forum for discussion and education in neuropsychiatry and related fields.

== See also ==
- Behavioral neurology
- Clinical neuroscience
