= Susanna Fogel =

American director, screenwriter and author

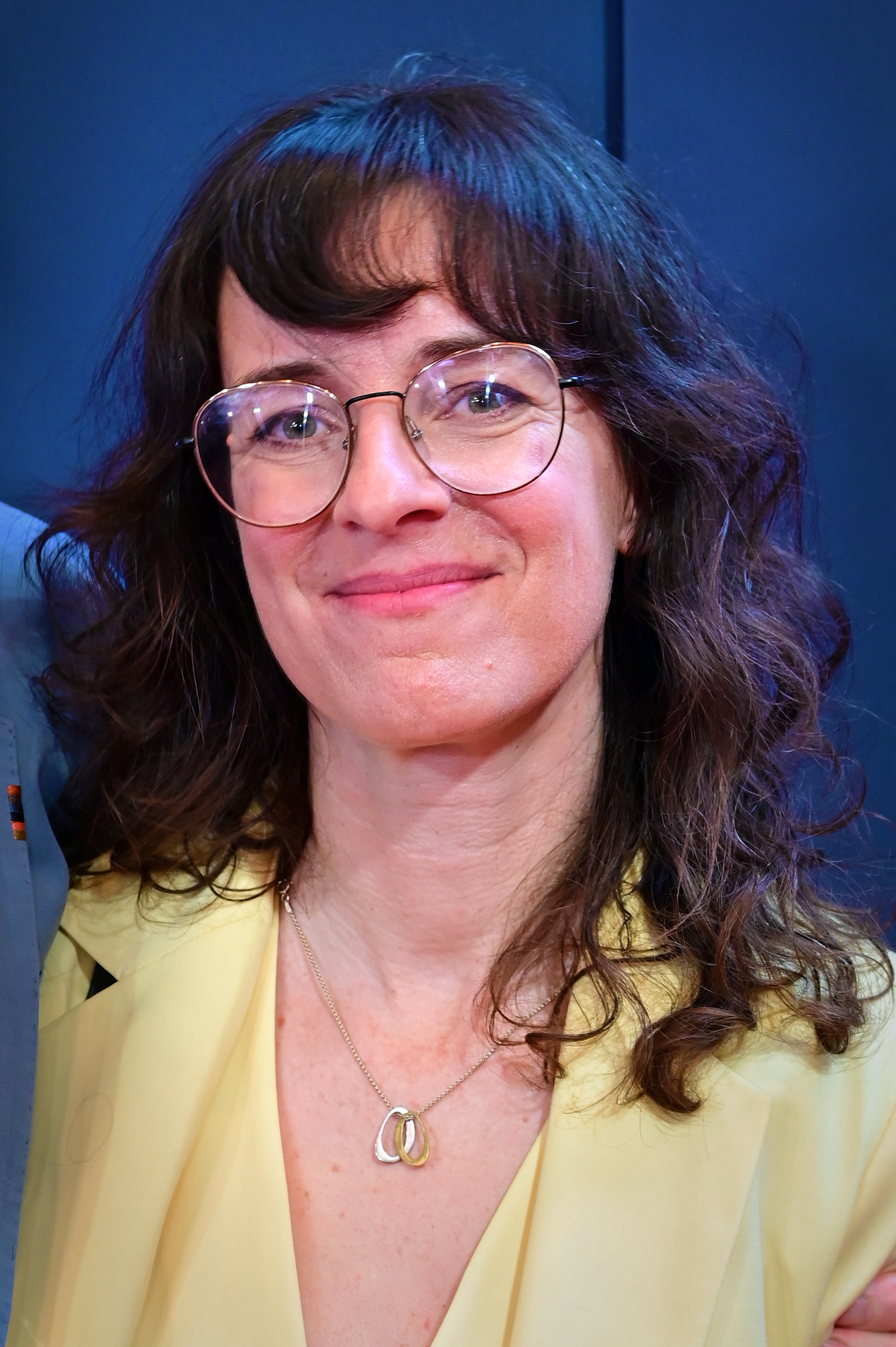
- Fogel in 2026
- Born: 8 October 1980 (age 45); Providence, Rhode Island
- Education: Concord Academy; Columbia University (BA)
- Occupations: director, screenwriter, author
- Years active: 2014 – present
- Spouse: Ira Glass
- Father: Barry S. Fogel
- Relatives: Jeremy Fogel (uncle)
- Awards: Directors Guild of America Award for Outstanding Directing – Comedy Series (2020)

Susanna Fogel is an American director, screenwriter and author, best known for co-writing the 2019 film Booksmart and for co-writing and directing the 2018 action/comedy The Spy Who Dumped Me. Her many accolades include a DGA Award and nominations at the BAFTA Film Awards, the Primetime Emmy Awards and the WGA Awards.

== Early life and education ==
Fogel was born in Providence, Rhode Island, where her parents were both faculty at Brown University. Her father is the neuropsychiatrist and Harvard Medical School professor Barry S. Fogel, who founded the American Neuropsychiatric Association, and her mother, Margaret Selkin Fogel, is a psychologist. Her grandfather, Daniel Fogel, was a personal lawyer to Los Angeles Mayor Tom Bradley. Her uncle, Jeremy Fogel, is a former United States district judge of the United States District Court for the Northern District of California. She graduated from Concord Academy in 1998.

In the summer before her senior year in college, she worked for James Schamus while he was producing Ang Lee's Hulk. She graduated from Columbia University in 2002. At Columbia, she was a writer of its 2001 Varsity Show. Her classmates included television writer and producer Lang Fisher.

== Career ==
Fogel and her writing partner Joni Lefkowitz originally wrote Life Partners as a one act play. They eventually adapted it into a screenplay which Fogel went on to direct. The film premiered at the 2014 Tribeca Film Festival.

Fogel co-created and executive produced the Lionsgate/ABC drama series Chasing Life, which ran for two seasons.

Fogel co-wrote the script for Booksmart with Emily Halpern, Sarah Haskins and Katie Silberman and was originally hired to direct the project, but was replaced during preproduction. The screenplay was later nominated for the BAFTA Award for Best Original Screenplay and the Writers Guild of America Award for Best Original Screenplay.

Frustrated by her experiences in the industry, Fogel co-wrote and directed the action-comedy The Spy Who Dumped Me. The film was released in 2018 and starred Mila Kunis and Kate McKinnon, the latter of whom had appeared briefly in Fogel's debut film.

She directed the pilot episodes for the television series The Wilds on Amazon, and The Flight Attendant on HBO Max, which she also Executive Produced. She has also directed episodes of Gillian Flynn’s Utopia, also for Amazon, and the return of Steven Spielberg’s Amazing Stories for Apple TV+. The Flight Attendant was nominated in the category of Best Television Series (Musical or Comedy) at the 2021 Golden Globe Awards.

In April 2021 Fogel was awarded the DGA Award in the Outstanding Directorial Achievement in a Comedy Series category for her work on The Flight Attendant. In July 2021 she was nominated for an Emmy Award for Best Comedy Director, also for The Flight Attendant.

She is a co-screenwriter of The Addams Family 2.

Fogel directed Cat Person, a thriller based on the short story of the same name by Kristen Roupenian, starring Emilia Jones and Nicholas Braun. She also directed the 2024 comedy-drama film Winner, about the life of American whistleblower Reality Winner.

=== Writing career ===
Fogel is a regular contributor to The New Yorker online.

Her novel, Nuclear Family: A Tragicomic Novel in Letters, was published in 2017.

== Filmography ==
=== Film ===
Year	Title	Director	Writer	Producer	Notes
1997	Words of Wisdom	Yes	Yes	No	Short film
2014	Life Partners	Yes	Yes	No	
2018	The Spy Who Dumped Me	Yes	Yes	Executive	
2019	Booksmart	No	Yes	No	
2021	The Addams Family 2	No	Yes	No	
2022	The Year Between	No	No	Executive	
2023	Cat Person	Yes	No	Executive	
2024	Winner	Yes	Yes	Yes	

=== Television ===
Year	Title	Creator	Director	Writer	Executive Producer	Notes
2014–2015	Chasing Life	Developer	Yes (1)	Yes (7)	Yes	
2017	Famous in Love	No	Yes (1)	No	No	
2017	Play by Play	No	Yes (4)	No	No	
2020	Amazing Stories	No	Yes (1)	No	No	
2020	Utopia	No	Yes (1)	No	No	
2020	The Wilds	No	Yes (1)	No	Yes	
2020	The Flight Attendant	No	Yes (2)	No	Yes	
2023	A Small Light	No	Yes (3)	No	Yes	Miniseries
2026	Ponies	Yes	Yes (4)	Yes (6)	Yes	
2026–present	Little House on the Prairie	No	No	No	Yes	

== Awards and nominations ==
Association	Year	Category	Work	Result	Ref.
Alliance of Women Film Journalists	2020	Best Woman Screenwriter	Booksmart	Nominated	
British Academy Film Awards	2020	Best Original Screenplay	Booksmart	Nominated	
Directors Guild of America Awards	2020	Outstanding Directorial Achievement in Comedy Series	The Flight Attendant	Won	
Dublin Film Critics Circle	2020	Best Screenplay	Booksmart	Nominated	
Hollywood Critics Association	2020	Best Original Screenplay	Booksmart	Nominated	
Hollywood Critics Association Midseason Awards	2020	Best Original Screenplay	Booksmart	Won	
Primetime Emmy Awards	2021	Outstanding Directing for a Comedy Series	The Flight Attendant	Nominated	
St. Louis Film Critics Association	2020	Best Original Screenplay	Booksmart	Nominated	
Writers Guild of America Awards	2020	Best Original Screenplay	Booksmart	Nominated	

== See also ==
- List of female film and television directors
- List of LGBT-related films directed by women
