= Jouberin =

Protein found in humans

AHI1

Identifiers
- Aliases: AHI1, AHI-1, JBTS3, ORF1, dJ71N10.1, Abelson helper integration site 1
- External IDs: OMIM: 608894; MGI: 87971; GeneCards: AHI1
Available structures
PDB	Ortholog search: PDBe RCSB
PDB	List of PDB id codes 4ESR

Gene location (Human)
Chr.	Chromosome 6 (human)
Band	6q23.3	Start	135,283,407 bp
Band	6q23.3	End	135,498,434 bp

Gene location (Mouse)
Chr.	Chromosome 10 (mouse)
Band	10 A3|10 9.75 cM	Start	20,828,446 bp
Band	10 A3|10 9.75 cM	End	20,956,328 bp
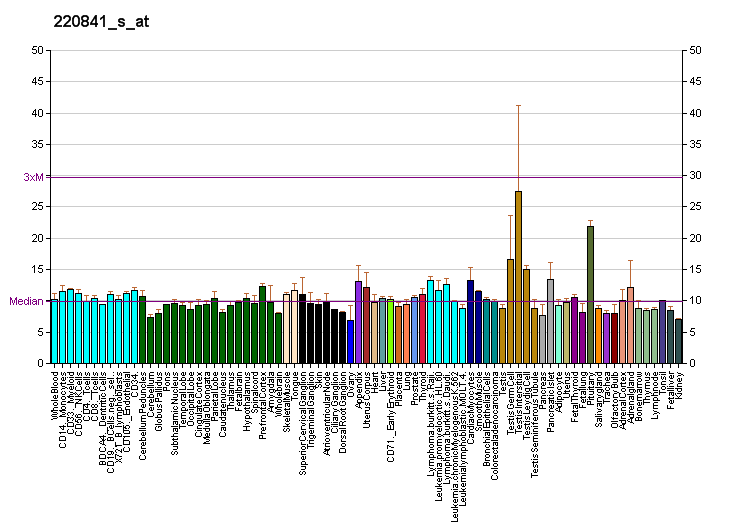

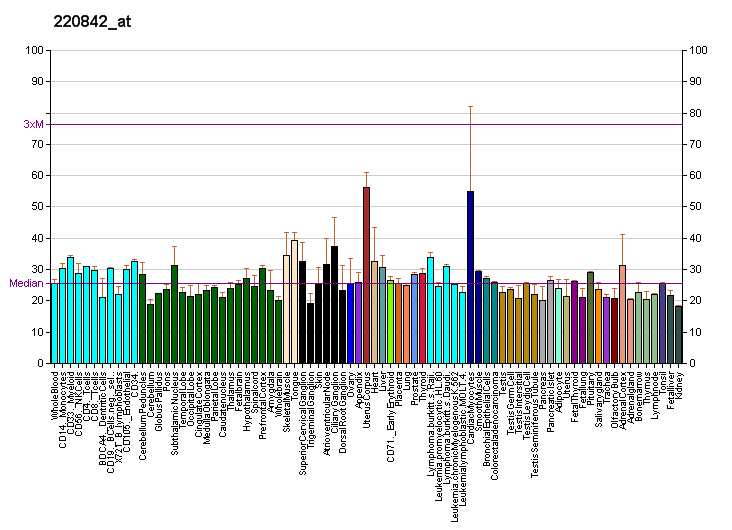

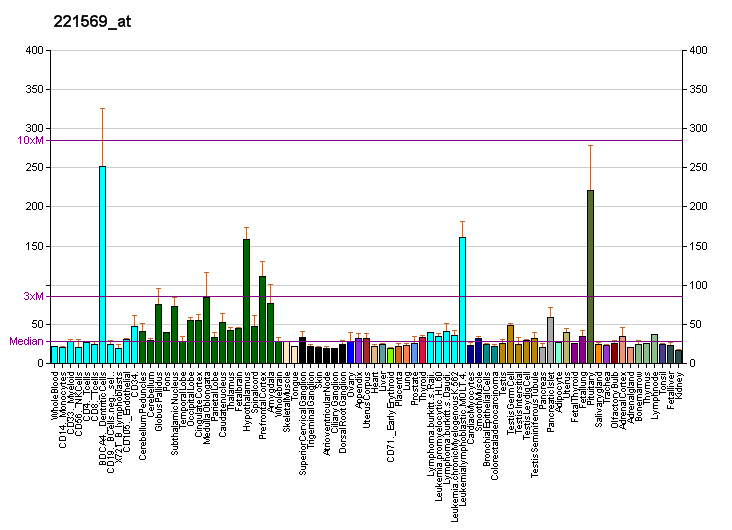
RNA expression pattern
Bgee	Human / Mouse (ortholog); Top expressed in: pituitary gland; Achilles tendon; right hemisphere of cerebellum; anterior pituitary; cerebellar vermis; testicle; middle temporal gyrus; primary visual cortex; Brodmann area 23; sural nerve / Top expressed in: ventromedial nucleus; paraventricular nucleus of hypothalamus; arcuate nucleus; dorsomedial hypothalamic nucleus; anterior amygdaloid area; lateral hypothalamus; median eminence; suprachiasmatic nucleus; ventral tegmental area; dorsal tegmental nucleus; More reference expression data
BioGPS	More reference expression data
Gene ontology
Molecular function	protein binding; identical protein binding
Cellular component	cytoplasm; ciliary basal body; cytosol; centrosome; cell projection; MKS complex; cell-cell junction; adherens junction; cell junction; cytoskeleton; centriole; cilium; non-motile cilium
Biological process	cilium assembly; pronephric nephron tubule morphogenesis; regulation of behavior; retina layer formation; positive regulation of receptor internalization; transmembrane receptor protein tyrosine kinase signaling pathway; hindbrain development; negative regulation of apoptotic process; morphogenesis of a polarized epithelium; photoreceptor cell outer segment organization; otic vesicle development; Kupffer's vesicle development; heart looping; specification of axis polarity; central nervous system development; cell projection organization; cloaca development; pronephric duct morphogenesis; positive regulation of polarized epithelial cell differentiation; vesicle-mediated transport; left/right axis specification; positive regulation of transcription by RNA polymerase II; cell differentiation; ciliary basal body-plasma membrane docking; multicellular organism development
Sources:Amigo / QuickGO
Orthologs
Databases	NCBI: entry; OMA: entry
Species	Human	Mouse
Entrez	54806	52906
Ensembl	ENSG00000135541	ENSMUSG00000019986
UniProt	Q8N157	Q8K3E5
RefSeq (mRNA)	NM_001134830; NM_001134831; NM_001134832; NM_017651; NM_001350503 NM_001350504	NM_001177776; NM_026203; NM_001358561
RefSeq (protein)	NP_001128302; NP_001128303; NP_001128304; NP_060121; NP_001337432 NP_001337433	XP_006512862.1
Location (UCSC)	Chr 6: 135.28 – 135.5 Mb	Chr 10: 20.83 – 20.96 Mb
PubMed search
- Wikidata
View/Edit Human	View/Edit Mouse

Jouberin is a protein that in humans is encoded by the gene AHI1 (Abelson helper integration site 1). It is known for the critical role it plays in brain development.

Proper cerebellar and cortical development in the human brain depends heavily on AHI1. The AHI1 gene is prominently expressed in the embryonic hindbrain and forebrain. AHI1 specifically encodes the Jouberin protein and mutations in the expression of the gene is known to cause specific forms of Joubert syndrome. Joubert syndrome is autosomal recessive and is characterized by the brain malformations and mental retardation that AHI1 mutations have the potential to induce. AHI1 has also been associated with schizophrenia and autism due to the role it plays in brain development. An AHI1 heterozygous knockout mouse model was studied by Bernard Lerer and his group at Hadassah Medical Center in Jerusalem to elucidate the correlation between alterations in AHI1 expression and the pathogenesis of neuropsychiatric disorders. The core temperatures and corticosterone secretions of the heterozygous knockout mice after exposure to environmental and visceral stress exhibited extreme repression of autonomic nervous system and hypothalamic-pituitary-adrenal responses. The knockout mice demonstrated an increased resilience to different types of stress and these results lead to a correlation between emotional regulation and neuropsychiatric disorders.
