= Neuropsychiatric Forum =

Neuropsychiatry-focused non profit

- Neuropsychiatrické fórum
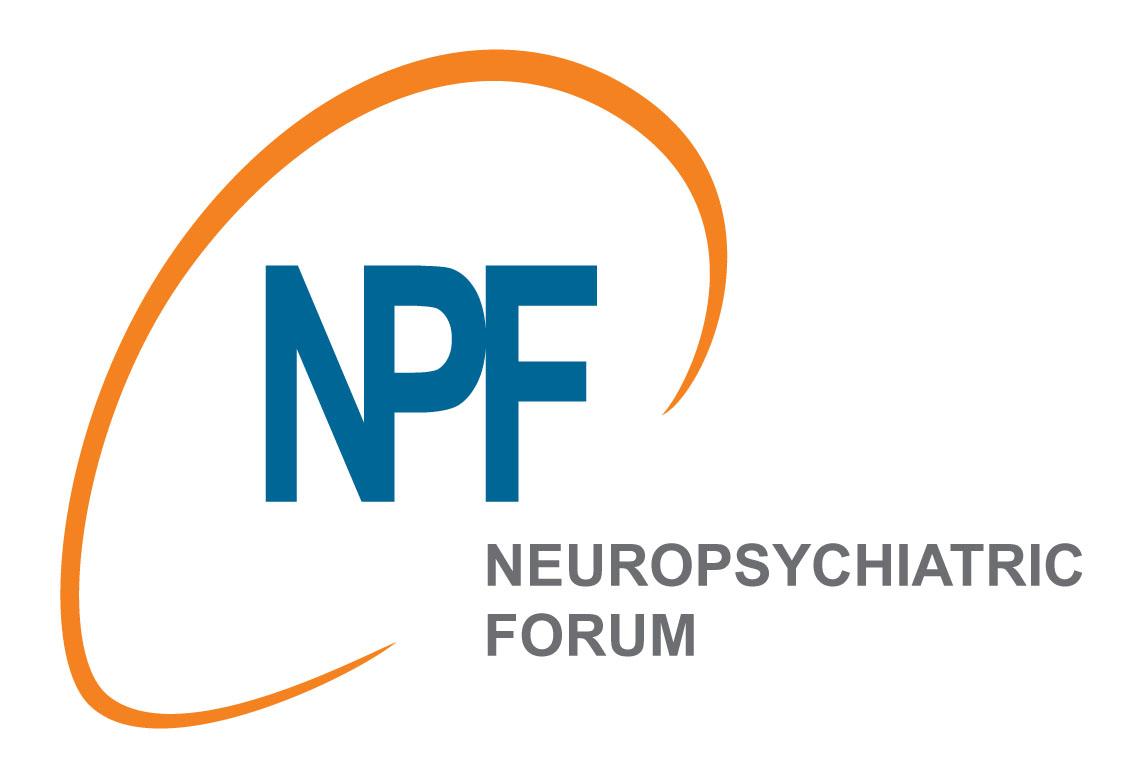
- Founded: 2011; 15 years ago
- Founded at: Czech Republic

Neuropsychiatric Forum (NPF) (Czech: Neuropsychiatrické fórum) is an international non-profit educational institution and professional organization whose primary mission is the development of neuropsychiatry. NPF was founded in 2011 in Prague, Czech Republic. In June 2011, NPF organized the first conference in Kaiserstein Palace in Prague attended by over 200 neurologists, psychiatrists, and psychologists.

NPF collaborates with several other professional organizations such as the European Society for Trauma and Dissociation (ESTD) and the European Federation of Psychiatric Trainees (EFPT).

NPF has similar scope like some other associations include the American Neuropsychiatric Association (ANPA), the British Neuropsychiatry Association (BNPA), or the International Neuropsychiatric Association.
