= Tactile discrimination =

Differentiating information through the sense of touch

Tactile discrimination is the ability to differentiate information through the sense of touch. The somatosensory system is the nervous system pathway that is responsible for this essential survival ability used in adaptation. There are various types of tactile discrimination. One of the most well known and most researched is two-point discrimination, the ability to differentiate between two different tactile stimuli which are relatively close together. Other types of discrimination like graphesthesia and spatial discrimination also exist but are not as extensively researched. Tactile discrimination is something that can be stronger or weaker in different people and two major conditions, chronic pain and blindness, can affect it greatly. Blindness increases tactile discrimination abilities which is extremely helpful for tasks like reading braille. In contrast, chronic pain conditions, like arthritis, decrease a person's tactile discrimination. One other major application of tactile discrimination is in new prosthetics and robotics which attempt to mimic the abilities of the human hand. In this case tactile sensors function similarly to mechanoreceptors in a human hand to differentiate tactile stimuli.

== Pathways ==
=== Somatosensory system ===
The somatosensory system includes multiple types of sensations from the body. This includes light, touch, pain, pressure, temperature, and joint /muscle sense. Each of these are categorized in three different areas: discriminative touch, pain and temperature, and proprioception. Discriminative touch includes touch, pressure, being able to recognize vibrations, etc. Pain and temperature includes the perception of pain/ amounts of pain and the severity of temperatures. The pain and temperature category of sensations also includes itching and tickling. Proprioception includes receptors for everything that occurs below the surface of the skin. This includes sensations on various muscles, joints, and tendons. Each of these three categories have their own types of pathways and receptors. These pathways target the cerebellum in the brain. This section of the brain tracks what the muscles are doing at all times so any potential damage to this area can greatly affect one's senses.

Pseudounipolar bipolar neurons

Within each Somatosensory pathway there are three types of neurons: the pseudounipolar neuron, secondary afferent neurons, and tertiary afferent neurons. There are also slowly adapting receptors that signify the receptors that sense the indents made on the skin. Rapidly adapting receptors are also present in this system. An example of a slowly adapting receptor in use is when a person breaks his/her arm, the arm is immobilized until it is healed. He/she does not want to forget that it is broken and do something that could potentially worsen the damage in the arm. An example of a rapid adapting receptor in use is putting on clothes. Initially you will feel the clothes being worn, but after a while you forget you are wearing clothes. It is not at the forefront of the brain to focus on the feeling of the clothes on your body; however, if you were to concentrate on that feeling, you could instantly feel the contact between your skin and the clothing being worn.

=== Discriminative touch system ===
The discriminative touch system deals with everything from the toes to the neck through the spinal cord. The sensation experienced enters the periphery by axons. More specifically, the sensory axons. This signal passes through axon to axon from the distal to proximal process. The proximal end of the specific axon leads into the spinal cord on the dorsal half. This then moves towards the brain. These axons that are leading the signal towards the spinal cord to the brain are classified as primary afferents. This makes sense as afferent is defined conducting toward something. These neurons are sending signals towards the brain. Those that receive the neuron synapses are classified as secondary afferents. These neurons go to the thalamus and then synapsed towards another set of neurons that move towards the cerebral cortex.

=== Types of receptors ===
There are many types of receptors in the somatosensory pathway including:

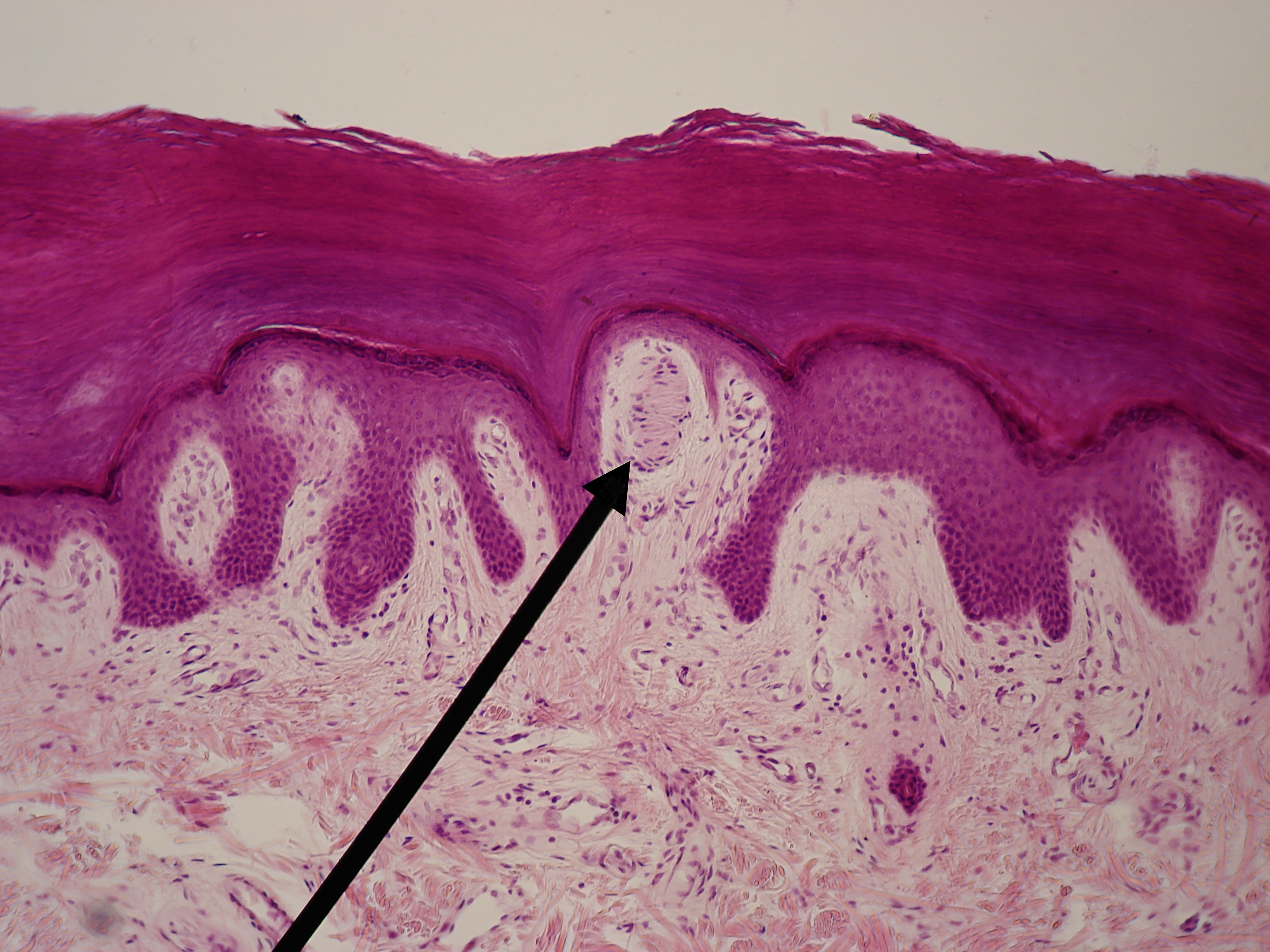
WVSOM Meissner's corpuscle

- Peripheral Mechanoreceptors - Activation of these receptors is the initial step of recognizing a stimulation. An indentation, as stated before, becomes an electrical signal in the peripheral process of a primary afferent neuron. This creates a depolarization across the membrane of the neuron and this leads to an action potential that goes to the cerebellum of the brain to initiate an action.
  - Merkel's Disks - Located on the upper part of the dermis. Slow adapting receptors. Found on the fingertips as well as the eyelids.
  - Meissner's Corpuscles - Located also on the upper part of the dermis. Found on the hairless skin including the lips as well as the eyelids. These are rapid adapting receptors.
- Thermoreceptors - These are receptors that are able to detect heat. There are actually 2 types of these receptors in mammals. One that can identify heat higher than body temperature and vice versa!

== Types of tactile discrimination ==
=== Stereognosis ===
Stereognosis (Tactile Gnosis) is defined as the ability to tell the difference and identify objects via touch in the absence of visual or auditory contact. The subject will need to be able to recognize temperature, spatial properties, texture, and size to reach an accurate conclusion to what the object is. This type of tactile discrimination will give an indication of the status of the Parietal lobe of the brain. When conducting this test, common objects that the subject is familiar with are used in order to ensure an accurate reading, and consistency amongst multiple tests with multiple different subjects. By utilizing this form of tactile discrimination, practitioners will be able to detect and track the presence or effects of Neurodegenerative Diseases such as Alzheimer's disease due to Astereognosis, which is the failure to recognize objects via touch without visual recognition.

=== Graphesthesia ===
Graphesthesia is the ability in which a person is able to recognize a number or letter that is written on the person's skin. Like other tactile discrimination tests, the test for this is a measurement of the patient's sense of touch, and requires that the patient perform the test voluntarily and without visual contact. The purpose of this form of tactile discrimination is to detect any defects in the Central nervous system such as lesions in the Brainstem, Spinal cord, Thalamus, or Sensory cortex. In order for this test to be carried out successfully, it is imperative that the subject's primary sensations be fully functional. A severe lesion in the Central Nervous System would suggest a loss in primary sensation. It is also important that the practitioner and the patient communicate ahead of time about the orientation of the characters, as well as where on the body the figures are to be drawn (usually on the palms of the hand). In order to make this tactile discrimination more flexible, the patient may select the correct answer from a series of images in lieu of communicating verbally if the patient suffers from a speech or language impairment. The Graphesthesia test is also more versatile than the Stereognosis test since it doesn't require the patient to be able to grasp an object.

=== Two-point discrimination ===
Two-point discrimination (2PD) is a neurological examination in which two sharp points are applied to the surface of a part of the body in order to see if the patient recognizes them as two discrete sensations. The two-point threshold is the smallest distance between the two points that the patient can recognize. By conducting this form of tactile discrimination, it is believed that practitioners will be able to discern the relative amount of nerves in the tested location. When conducting the procedure on the desired part of the body, the practitioner may apply both points simultaneously or with just one point. The practitioner may switch between the two at random. In order for the examination to be conducted in the most proper fashion, it is imperative that there be clear and open communication between the subject and the practitioner with the subject being fully conscious and not under any sort of influence while at the same time not making visual contact with the device. The efficacy of Two-point discrimination has come under scrutiny from many researchers despite being commonly used to this day in a clinical setting. Research studies have shown that the 2PD test does a poor job of determining the degree to which the nerves regain their function after damage, as well as determining the sensory failures in the first place, owing to this form of tactile discrimination's simplicity, crudeness, and dependence on anecdotal evidence. The research studies have also shown that there is a discrepancy between the data obtained from 2PD tests and data obtained from other tests used to measure tactile spatial acuity.

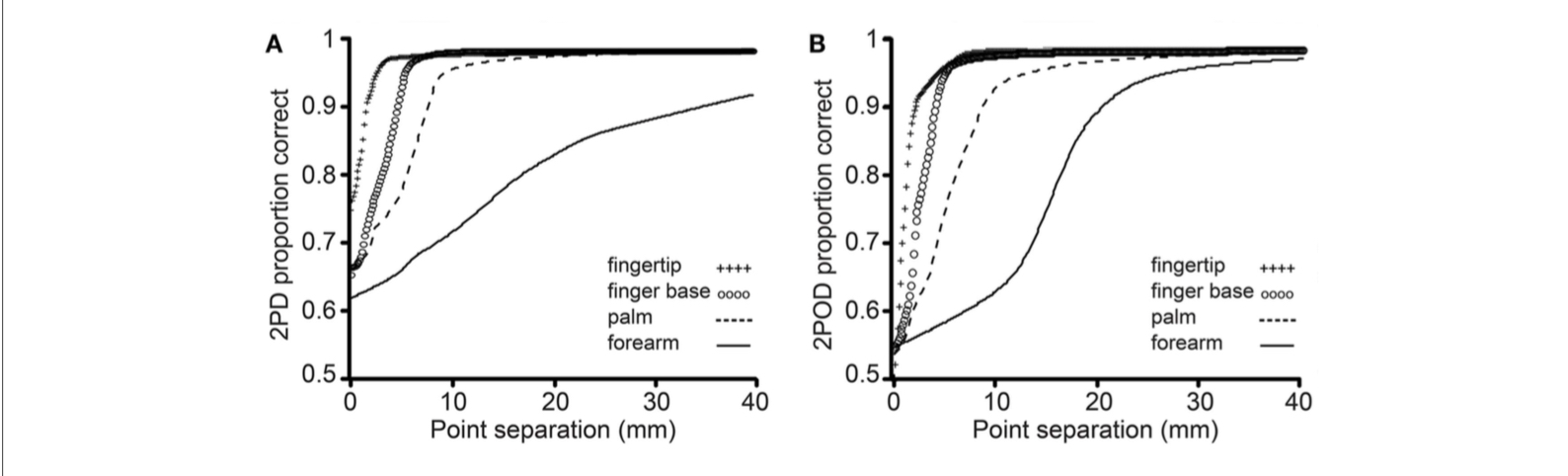
2-point orientation discrimination (2POD) compared to traditional two-point discrimination (2PD)

=== Spatial discrimination ===
Spatial discrimination is another form of Two-point discrimination in which the practitioner tests for innervation of the skin with two blunt points of a compass (drawing tool). Just with like 2PD, the patient must be able to discriminate between the two applied points. All other parameters, methods, and objectives of the Spatial discrimination tactile discrimination and the 2PD tactile discrimination remain the same.

== Applications ==
=== Blindness ===
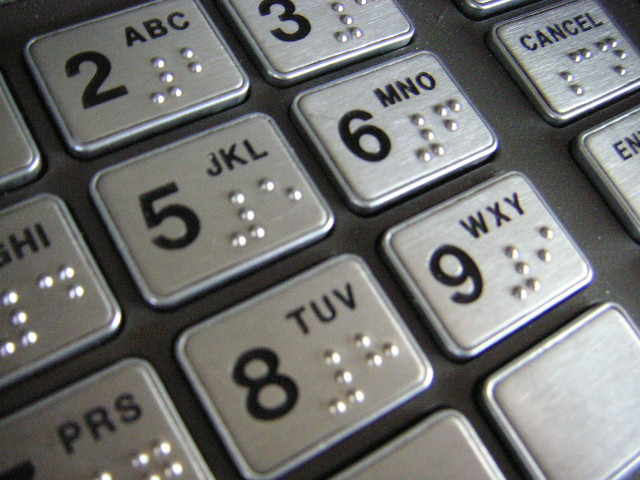
Common Keypad with Braille

When a person has become blind, in order to “see” the world, their other senses become heightened. An important sense for the blind is their sense of touch, which becomes more frequently used to help them perceive the world. People that are blind have displayed that their visual cortices become more responsive to auditory and tactile stimulation. Braille allows the blind to be able to use their sense of touch to feel the roughness, and distance of various patterns to be used as a form of language. Within the brain, the activation of the occipital cortex is functionally relevant for tactile braille reading, as well as the somatosensory cortex. These various parts of the brain function in their own way, in which they each contribute to the effectiveness of how braille is read by the blind. People that are blind also rely heavily on Tactile Gnosis, Spatial discrimination, Graphesthesia, and Two-point discrimination. Essentially, the occipital cortex allows one to effectively make judgements on the distance of braille patterns, which is related to spatial discrimination. Meanwhile, the somatosensory cortex allows one to effectively make judgements on the roughness of braille patterns, which is related to two-point discrimination. The various visual areas in the brain are very essential for a blind person to read braille, just as much as it is for a person that has sight. Essentially, whether one is blind or not, the perception of objects that involves tactile discrimination is not impaired if one cannot see. When comparing people that are blind to people that have sight, the amount of activity within their somatosensory and visual areas of the brain do differ. The activity in the somatosensory and visual areas are not as high in tactile gnosis for people that are not blind, and are more-so active for more visual related stimuli that does not involve touch. Nonetheless, there is a difference in these various areas within the brain when comparing the blind to the sighted, which is that shape discrimination causes a difference in brain activity, as well as tactile gnosis. The visual cortices of blind individuals are active during various vision related tasks including tactile discrimination, and the function of the cortices resemble the activity of adults with sight.

=== Chronic pain ===
Some non-neuropathic chronic pain conditions have been shown to decrease tactile acuity, the ability to precisely detect touch. There is a difference between different chronic pain conditions and how they affect tactile acuity deficits. One of the conditions with the most profound deficits in tactile acuity is arthritis. This condition affects the tactile acuity both at the site of the pain and at remote locations away from the pain. This suggests that the deficit may be a result of a cortical reorganization, or cortical remapping in the patient's brain. Other conditions, like complex regional pain syndrome and chronic lower back pain, show deficits only at the site of pain. Still other conditions like burning mouth syndrome shows no deficit in tactile acuity at all. Although there is evidence that some chronic pain conditions cause a decrease in tactile acuity there is no evidence to suggest when this deficit becomes clinically meaningful and affects the function of the patient.

=== Robotic tactile discrimination ===
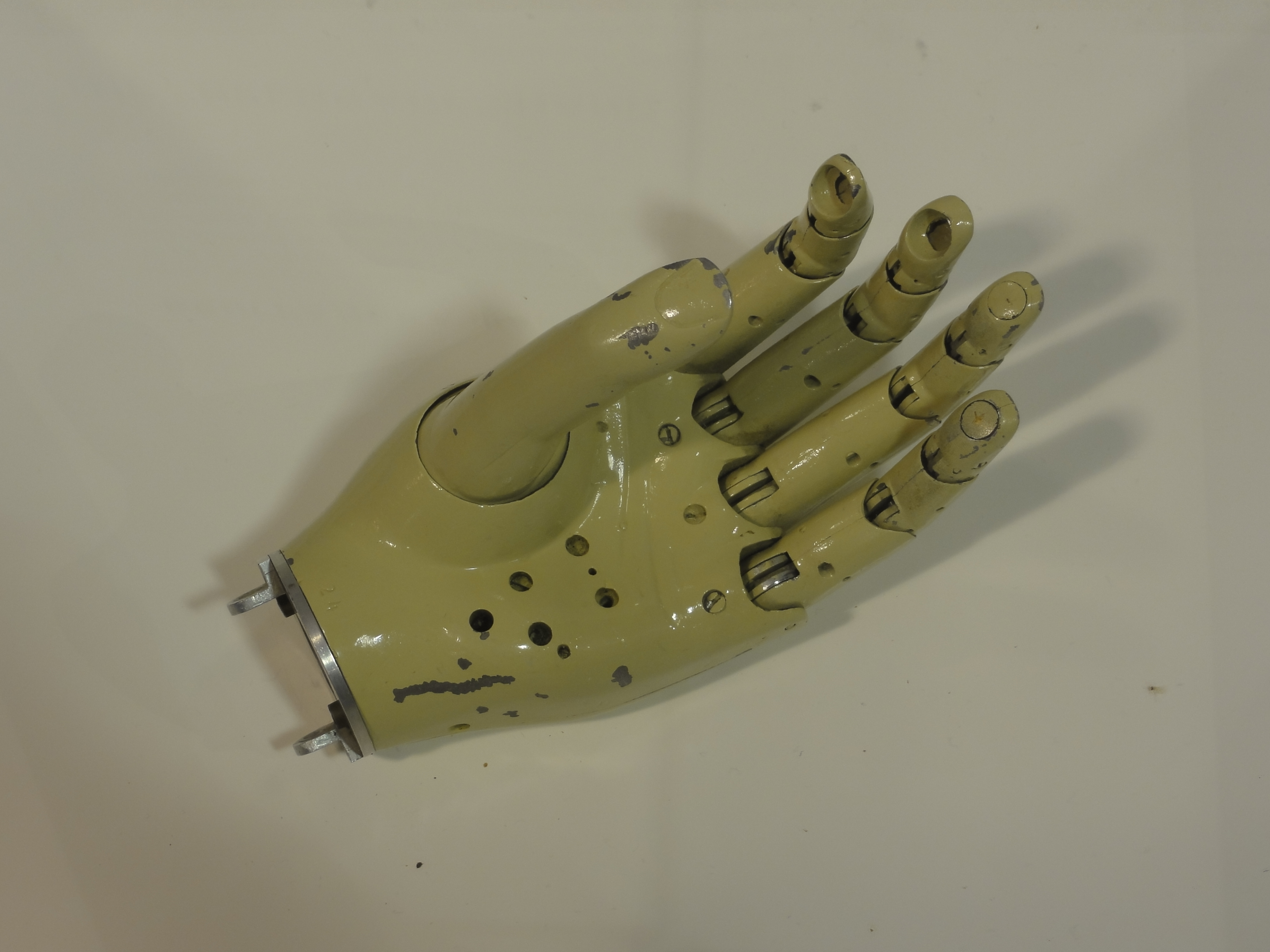
Early robotic prosthetic hand, made in 1963. On open public display at the main shopping mall in Belgrade.

As robots and prosthetic limbs become more complex the need for sensors capable of detecting touch with high tactile acuity becomes more and more necessary. There are many types of tactile sensors used for different tasks. There are three types of tactile sensors. The first, single point sensors, can be compared to a single cell, or whiskers, and can detect very local stimuli. The second type of sensor is a high spatial resolution sensor which can be compared to a human fingertip and is essential for the tactile acuity in robotic hands. The third and final tactile sensor type is a low spatial resolution sensor which has similar tactile acuity as the skin on one's back or arm. These sensors can be placed meaningfully throughout the surface of a prosthetic or a robot to give it the ability to sense touch in similar, if not better, ways than the human counterpart.
