= William Alwyn Lishman =

British psychiatrist and neurologist (1931–2021)

William Alwyn Lishman (16 May 1931 – 24 January 2021) was a British psychiatrist and neurologist most famous for writing Lishman's Organic Psychiatry, a neuropsychiatry textbook and standard reference for over thirty years in its field. Publishing company Blackwell had sought out Lishman to write the textbook, though he was reluctant until one day he wanted to buy a grand piano, which he did with an advance on the book.

Lishman was the founding chair of the British Neuropsychiatry Association.
