= American Neuropsychiatric Association =

Organization of professionals in neuroscience

The American Neuropsychiatric Association (ANPA) is a non-profit organization of professionals in neuropsychiatry, behavioral neurology and the clinical neurosciences, with over 700 members from around the world. Established in 1988, its mission is to improve the lives of people with disorders at the interface of psychiatry and neurology, with the vision of transforming recognition, understanding and treatment of neuropsychiatric disorders. It founded in 1988 by two academic physicians doubly certified in neurology and psychiatry, Barry S. Fogel and Randolph Schiffer.

The ANPA holds an annual scientific meeting in the early spring. It has also established Special Interest Groups (SIGs) for its members to enhance peer discussion, education, and potential collaboration. Current SIGs include Clinical Practice, Conversion Disorders, Dementia, Developmental Disorders and Pediatrics, Early Career, Epilepsy, Forensics, Global Health, Movement Disorders, Neuroimaging and Traumatic Brain Injury.

Some other professional organizations with similar scope include the British Neuropsychiatry Association (BNPA), Royal College of Psychiatrists (UK) Section of Neuropsychiatry, the International Neuropsychiatric Association, and Neuropsychiatric forum (NPF).

Together with the Society for Behavioral and Cognitive Neurology, the ANPA co-sponsors the subspecialty certification in Behavioral Neurology & Neuropsychiatry, offered under the auspices of the United Council for Neurological Subspecialties (UCNS).

The Journal of Neuropsychiatry and Clinical Neurosciences (JNCN), published by the American Psychiatric Association, is the official journal of the ANPA.

== Fellows ==
Fellows of the ANPA (FANPA) are elected from members with special achievement in neuropsychiatry, behavioral neurology, neuropsychology or the clinical neurosciences. As of March 2018, fellows include:

- 2000:

James R. Merikangas, M.D. Barry S. Fogel, M.D. Randolph B. Schiffer, M.D. Gary J. Tucker, M.D. Trevor R.P.Price, M.D. Jeffrey L. Cummings, M.D. Stephen Salloway, M.D., M.S. Robert G. Robinson, M.D. C. Edward Coffey, M.D Stuart C. Yudofsky, M.D. Thomas W. McAllister, M.D.

- 2001:

John J. Campbell, M.D. Edward Lauterbach, M.D. Jonathan M. Silver, M.D. Robert A. Stern, Ph.D. Paula T. Trzepacz, M.D.

- 2002:

Fred Ovsiew, M.D. Laura A. Flashman, Ph.D. Paul F. Malloy, Ph.D. Richard M. Restak, M.D.

- 2003:

Sheldon Benjamin, M.D. Robert C. Green, M.D. Alya Reeve, M.D.

- 2004:

Nashaat Boutros, M.D. James D. Duffy, M.B.Ch.B. Robin A. Hurley, M.D.

- 2005:

David B. Arciniegas, M.D. Daniel I. Kaufer, M.D. Katherine H. Taber, Ph.D.

- 2006:

Kevin J. Black, M.D. Allen J. Rubin, M.D.

- 2007:

Tiffany Chow, M.D.

- 2008:

Robert A. Bornstein, Ph.D. Jeremy D. Schmahmann, M.D.

- 2009:

Yonas E. Geda, M.D. Daniel R. Wilson, M.D., Ph.D.

- 2010:

Deborah N. Black, M.D. Richard B. Ferrell, M.D. Colin J. Harrington, M.D. Bernardino Vaccaro, M.D.

- 2011:

Clark A. Anderson, M.D. Miles G. Cunningham, M.D., Ph.D. Mario F. Mendez, M.D., Ph.D., Kenneth Bryant, M.D.

- 2012

W. Curt LaFrance, Jr., M.D., M.P.H.

- 2013

Kristin Brousseau, D.O. David A. Silbersweig, M.D.

- 2014

Moises Gaviria, M.D. Kaloyan S. Tanev, M.D. Hal S. Wortzel, M.D.

- 2015

Jay Salpekar, M.D. Valerie Voon, M.D.

- 2016

Omar Ghaffar, M.D., M.Sc., FRCPC Margo D. Lauterbach, MD Shirlene M. Sampson, M.D. Vani Rao, M.B.B.S., M.D.

- 2017

Andrea E. Cavanna, M.D., Ph.D., FRCP

- 2018

Barbara Schildkrout, M.D.

== See also ==
- Neuropsychiatry
- Clinical neuroscience
- Behavioral neurology
- Neurology
- Psychiatry
- Neuropsychology
