= Nicholas Braun =

American actor (born 1988)

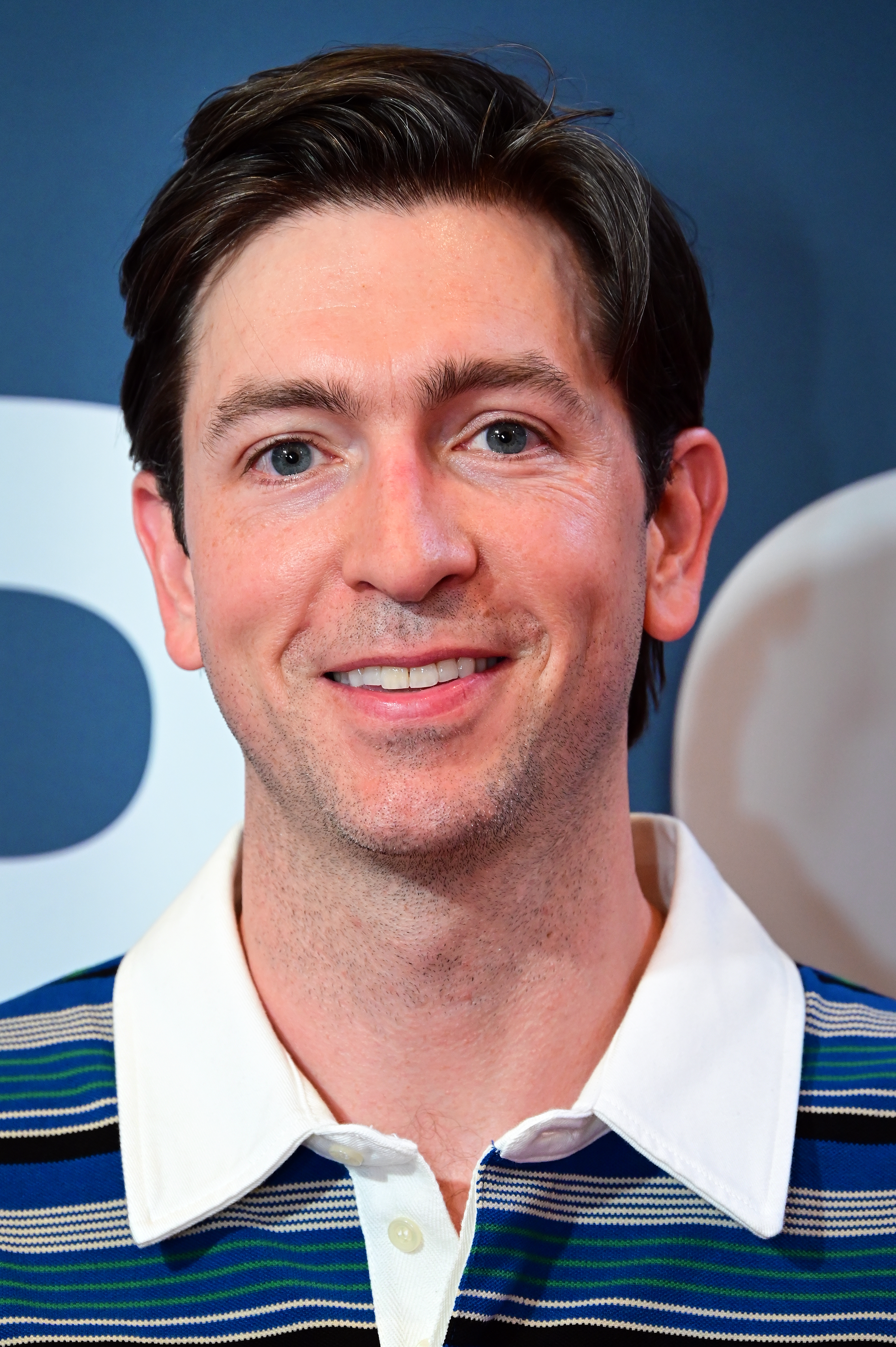
- Braun in 2026
- Born: Nicholas Joseph Braun; May 1, 1988 (age 38); Bethpage, New York, U.S.
- Occupation: Actor
- Years active: 2001–present
- Father: Craig Braun

Nicholas Joseph Braun (born May 1, 1988) is an American actor. He is known for his role as Greg Hirsch in the HBO series Succession (2018–2023), for which he received three nominations for the Primetime Emmy Award for Outstanding Supporting Actor in a Drama Series. He has also appeared in several films, including Sky High (2005), Princess Protection Program (2009), Red State (2011), Prom (2011), The Perks of Being a Wallflower (2012), The Watch (2012), Date and Switch (2014), How to Be Single (2016), Zola (2021), and Cat Person (2023).

== Early life ==
Braun was born and raised on Long Island, New York. His father, Craig Braun, is an actor and a former graphic designer, who co-designed the Rolling Stones' tongue and lips logo. Braun's parents divorced when he was five years old and thereafter he divided his time between his mother's home in Connecticut and his father's home in Manhattan.

Braun attended boarding school as a teenager, and acted during summer breaks. He attended Occidental College as a math major, but dropped out after two years to continue pursuing a career in acting.

== Career ==
=== Film and television ===
Encouraged by his father, Braun began to take acting classes at a very young age.

Braun is 6 ft 7 in (2.01 m). He has said his height has cost him parts and that he occasionally tried to present himself as shorter early in his career.

He made his film debut in Sky High. He had roles in the Disney Channel Original Movies Minutemen (2008) and Princess Protection Program (2009). He played the regular role of Cameron on the ABC Family show 10 Things I Hate About You, until it was cancelled with its final episode airing on May 24, 2010. He appeared in The Secret Life of the American Teenager and portrayed the character Cole Waters on the web series The LXD. In 2011, he played Lloyd Taylor in Disney's theatrical release Prom, and Billy Ray in Kevin Smith's Red State. The following year, he had a supporting role in the coming-of-age film The Perks of Being a Wallflower (2012).

In 2015, he was featured on two tracks of the Phantoms' debut EP, Broken Halo. He provided vocals on the title track and on "Voyeur". He also co-starred in both Date and Switch (2014) and How to Be Single (2016). He played Derrek in the A24 drama film Zola (2021), which was directed by Janicza Bravo and written by Jeremy O. Harris. The film received positive reviews.

In 2018, Braun became a member of the main cast of the HBO drama series Succession, playing Gregory Hirsch. For his performance in the show, Braun received critical acclaim and was nominated three times—in 2020, 2022, and 2023—for a Primetime Emmy Award for Outstanding Supporting Actor in a Drama Series.

On July 29, 2020, Braun released the music video for his single "Antibodies (Do You Have The)". He stated that the song was made in partnership with Partners In Health and the COPE Program to encourage listeners to donate in support of those most at risk from the pandemic.

In 2022, he appeared in the IFC mockumentary series Documentary Now! episode "Soldier of Illusion, Parts 1 & 2", directed by Alex Buono and Rhys Thomas. The installment parodied the films of Werner Herzog and was written by John Mulaney.

Braun starred in the Susanna Fogel drama Cat Person (2023), which premiered at the 2023 Sundance Film Festival. The film is based on the 2017 short story featured in The New Yorker, which was released amid the MeToo movement. Braun then appeared in the fantasy film Dream Scenario, directed by Kristoffer Borgli. He was cast as both filmmaker Jim Henson and entertainer Andy Kaufman for the 2024 biographical dramedy Saturday Night and appeared in the 2026 thriller The Sheep Detectives, based on the novel Three Bags Full.

=== Theatre ===
Braun made his professional stage debut as Doug in the 2025 off-Broadway revival of Rajiv Joseph's play Gruesome Playground Injuries at the Lucille Lortel Theatre. He made his Broadway debut in All Out: Comedy About Ambition in February 2026.

== Personal life ==
Braun has invested in various bars and restaurants in New York City.

== Filmography ==
=== Film ===
Key
†	Denotes films that have not yet been released

Year	Title	Role	Notes
2005	Sky High	Zach / Zach Attack	
2009	The First Time	Ernie	
2011	Red State	Billy Ray	
2011	Chalet Girl	Nigel	
2011	Prom	Lloyd Taylor	
2012	The Watch	Jason	
2012	The Perks of Being a Wallflower	Ponytail Derek	
2013	At Middleton	Justin	
2014	Date and Switch	Michael	
2015	The Stanford Prison Experiment	Karl Vandy	
2015	Poltergeist	Boyd	
2015	Freaks of Nature	Dag Parker	
2016	How to Be Single	Josh	
2016	Whiskey Tango Foxtrot	Tall Brian	
2016	Get a Job	Charlie	
2016	Good Kids	Andy Evans	
2017	The Year of Spectacular Men	Charlie	
2017	Avenues	Peter	
2020	Zola	Derrek	
2020	The Big Ugly	Will	
2023	Cat Person	Robert Holt	
2023	Dream Scenario	Brian Berg	Cameo
2024	Saturday Night	Jim Henson, Andy Kaufman	
2025	Splitsville	Matt	
2026	Idiots	Pricka Bush Da Werewoof	
2026	The Sheep Detectives	Tim Derry	
2026	One Night Only	Woodrow K. Mullhand	Cameo
2027	Famous †		Post-production
2027	The Entertainment System Is Down †		Post-production
TBA	Hivemind †		Filming

=== Television ===
Year	Title	Role	Notes
2001	Walter and Henry	Henry	Television film
2002	Law & Order: Special Victims Unit	Kid	Episode: "Surveillance"
2004	Carry Me Home	Zeke	Television film
2006	Without a Trace	Zander Marrs	Episode: "Fade-Away"
2007	Shark	Craig	Episode: "Teacher's Pet"
2008	Minutemen	Zeke Thompson	Television film
2008	Cold Case	Lenny Snow (1951)	Episode: "Shore Leave"
2009	The Secret Life of the American Teenager	Randy	Episode: "Money for Nothing, Chicks for Free"
2009	Princess Protection Program	Ed	Television film
2009–2010	10 Things I Hate About You	Cameron James	Main cast
2009	Three Rivers	Michael	Episode: "The Luckiest Man"
2011	CSI: Crime Scene Investigation	Neal Monroe	Episode: "Hitting for the Cycle"
2011	Brave New World	Matt Koutnick	Unsold NBC pilot
2012	Friend Me	Rob	Unaired series
2018–2023	Succession	Greg Hirsch	Main cast
2020	Home Movie: The Princess Bride	The Albino	2 episodes
2021	Calls	Tim (voice)	Episode: "The End"
2021	Birdgirl	Etan Delvay (voice)	Episode: "ShareBear"
2021	Saturday Night Live	Himself	Episode: "Jason Sudeikis / Brandi Carlile"
2021	Santa Inc.	Devin (voice)	7 episodes
2022	The Simpsons	Cousin Greg (voice)	Episode: "Meat Is Murder"
2022	Documentary Now!	Kevin Butterman	2 episodes

=== Theatre ===
Year	Title	Role	Venue	Ref.
2025	Gruesome Playground Injuries	Doug	Lucille Lortel Theatre, Off-Broadway	
2026	All Out: Comedy About Ambition	Performer	Nederlander Theatre, Broadway	

=== Web ===
Year	Title	Role	Notes
2008–2011	Poor Paul	Clyde	22 episodes
2010	The LXD	Cole Waters	3 episodes
2011	Corey & Lucas for the Win!	Lloyd Taylor	Episode: "Party All Night!"
2015	Wrestling Isn't Wrestling	Theater audience member	Short film

=== Music videos ===
Year	Title	Artist(s)	Role	Ref.
2009	"I Want You to Want Me" (10 Things I Hate About You version)	KSM	Cameron James	
2011	"Your Surrender" (Prom version)	Neon Trees	Lloyd Taylor	
2015	"Voyeur"	Phantoms featuring Nicholas Braun	Himself	
2015	"Broken Halo"	Phantoms featuring Nicholas Braun	Himself	
2021	"Antibodies (Do You Have The)"	Nicholas Braun	Himself	

== Awards and nominations ==
Organization	Year	Category	Nominated work	Result	Ref.
Critics' Choice Television Awards	2022	Best Supporting Actor in a Drama Series	Succession	Nominated	
Primetime Emmy Awards	2020	Outstanding Supporting Actor in a Drama Series	Succession	Nominated	
Primetime Emmy Awards	2022	Outstanding Supporting Actor in a Drama Series	Succession	Nominated	
Primetime Emmy Awards	2023	Outstanding Supporting Actor in a Drama Series	Succession	Nominated	
Screen Actors Guild Awards	2022	Outstanding Performance by an Ensemble in a Drama Series	Succession	Won	
Screen Actors Guild Awards	2024	Outstanding Performance by an Ensemble in a Drama Series	Succession	Won	
