= Cat Person (film) =

2023 film by Susanna Fogel

- Theatrical release poster
- Directed by: Susanna Fogel
- Screenplay by: Michelle Ashford
- Based on: "Cat Person" by Kristen Roupenian
- Produced by: Jeremy Steckler; Helen Estabrook
- Starring: Emilia Jones; Nicholas Braun; Geraldine Viswanathan; Hope Davis; Fred Melamed; Isabella Rossellini
- Cinematography: Manuel Billeter
- Edited by: Jacob Craycroft
- Music by: Heather McIntosh
- Production companies: StudioCanal; The New Yorker Studios
- Distributed by: StudioCanal (France); Rialto Pictures (United States)
- Release dates: January 21, 2023 (Sundance); October 6, 2023 (United States)
- Running time: 120 minutes
- Countries: France; United States
- Language: English
- Budget: $12 million
- Box office: $410,324

Cat Person is a 2023 psychological thriller film directed by Susanna Fogel from a screenplay by Michelle Ashford, based on the 2017 short story of the same name by Kristen Roupenian. The film stars Emilia Jones, Nicholas Braun, Geraldine Viswanathan, Hope Davis, Fred Melamed, and Isabella Rossellini.

Cat Person premiered at the Sundance Film Festival on January 21, 2023. The film was released in the United States on October 6, 2023, by Rialto Pictures.

== Plot ==
College sophomore Margot works at a local movie theater. Her roommate, Taylor, moderates a feminist subreddit called "The Vagenda", and tends to see the worst in men. Margot begins dating a frequent visitor of the movie theater, Robert. Margot begins to imagine Robert violently attacking her.

After their first official date, Robert learns Margot is only 20. They are turned away from a bar and return to his house to have sex. Throughout the encounter, Margot speaks to a second version of herself. Her other self tries to convince her to tell Robert she has changed her mind. Instead, Margot has sex with him and fakes an orgasm, telling her other self she is afraid of violent retaliation. She discovers Robert is 33, and notes that the house has no sign of the cats he mentioned in his texts.

Margot debates whether or not to ghost Robert and imagines him dying in various ways. Taylor steals Margot's phone and texts him "I'm not interested please stop texting." Robert initially takes this well, but later sends Margot a barrage of messages and calls her a whore.

Later, Margot realizes Robert is following her. She reports this to the police, who say he technically is not breaking the law, but advise her to contact the reporting officer if she has more solid evidence. Margot considers buying a taser, and the salesperson suggests she buy a gun. She ends up buying tracking devices to see if Robert is actually stalking her.

While planting the tracking device in Robert's car, she comes face to face with a dog, the same dog she previously saw inside the dorm. She realizes that Robert had been following her before they met. Robert hears the commotion and comes into the garage to investigate, discovering Margot. In a panic, Margot accidentally sprays herself with pepper spray and hits her head on the garage floor, rendering her unconscious.

When Margot regains consciousness, she finds herself inside Robert's house. Robert explains that he stalked her before they began dating, and they begin to argue. During the argument, he considers drugging Margot to induce memory loss and dropping her off at her dorm, fearing that if she left in her injured state, she would alter the story in a way that could possibly lead to him getting arrested. Margot tries to escape, but Robert drags her back inside and a physical struggle ensues.

During the struggle, Margot opens a door that leads to the basement, and a cat escapes, meaning Robert did not lie about having cats after all. They continue to fight and end up falling down the basement stairs. During the fall, a space heater is knocked over and starts a fire. Robert climbs into his house's cistern to avoid the flames and Margot hesitates before joining him. Both survive the fire.

Margot wakes up in the hospital and eventually recovers. She was told that Robert left town and did not leave a way for anyone to contact him. After Margot returns to work at the movie theater, a new man hits on her.

== Cast ==
- Emilia Jones as Margot
- Nicholas Braun as Robert Holt
- Geraldine Viswanathan as Taylor
- Hope Davis as Kelly
- Fred Melamed as Dr. Resnick
- Isabella Rossellini as Dr. Enid Zabala
- Liza Koshy as Beth
- Isaac Cole Powell as Clay
- Christopher Shyer as Ernie
- Josh Andrés Rivera as Dave
- Liza Colón-Zayas as Officer Elaine
- Michael Gandolfini as Peter

== Production ==
The film is an adaption of the 2017 short story of the same name written by Kristen Roupenian for The New Yorker. See also Alexis Nowicki's characterisation of the source material.

On June 20, 2021, StudioCanal and Imperative Entertainment announced they would be partnering in adapting the short story into a psychological thriller, with Susanna Fogel directing from a screenplay by Michelle Ashford, and starring Nicholas Braun and Emilia Jones. In October 2021, Geraldine Viswanathan, Hope Davis, Michael Gandolfini, Liza Koshy, Fred Melamed, Isaac Cole Powell, Isabella Rossellini, and Donald Elise Watkins joined the cast.

Production began on October 14, 2021. Principal photography took place in Jersey City and Newark, New Jersey.

== Release ==
Cat Person premiered at the Sundance Film Festival on January 21, 2023. It was released in the United States by Rialto Pictures on October 6, 2023. It was later released on VOD on December 1, 2023, only through Hoopla and Spectrum on Demand.

Following its Sundance premiere, it received distribution offers from Netflix, Bleecker Street and Open Road Films, but StudioCanal refused due to CAA's desire for a theatrical release. The film, which was budgeted at $12 million, was ultimately sold to Rialto Pictures and got a theatrical release in October, making only $338,541.

== Reception ==
On the review aggregator website Rotten Tomatoes, 46% of 122 critics' reviews are positive, with an average rating of 5.6/10. The website's consensus reads: "Feasting fancifully on its own coarse innovations, Cat Person is a drawn-out adaptation that doesn't land on its feet." Metacritic, which uses a weighted average, assigned the film a score of 48 out of 100, based on 30 critics, indicating "mixed or average" reviews.
