= Svenny Kopp =

Swedish psychiatrist

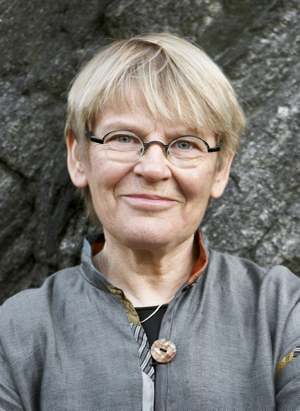
- Svenny Kopp in November 2010
- Born: 22 April 1948 (age 76); Gothenburg, Sweden

Svenny Kopp (born 22 April 1948) is a Swedish psychiatrist at Queen Silvia Children's Hospital, in Gothenburg. Her research is primarily focused on neuropsychiatric disorders in children and adolescents. Kopp studied for her doctorate at the Institute of Neuroscience and Physiology at the Sahlgrenska Academy at the University of Gothenburg. In her thesis, titled the "Girl Project", found that girls with signs of autism and ADHD are often not taken seriously and misdiagnosed by professionals.
