= Elinor Carucci =

Israeli-American photographer (born 1971)

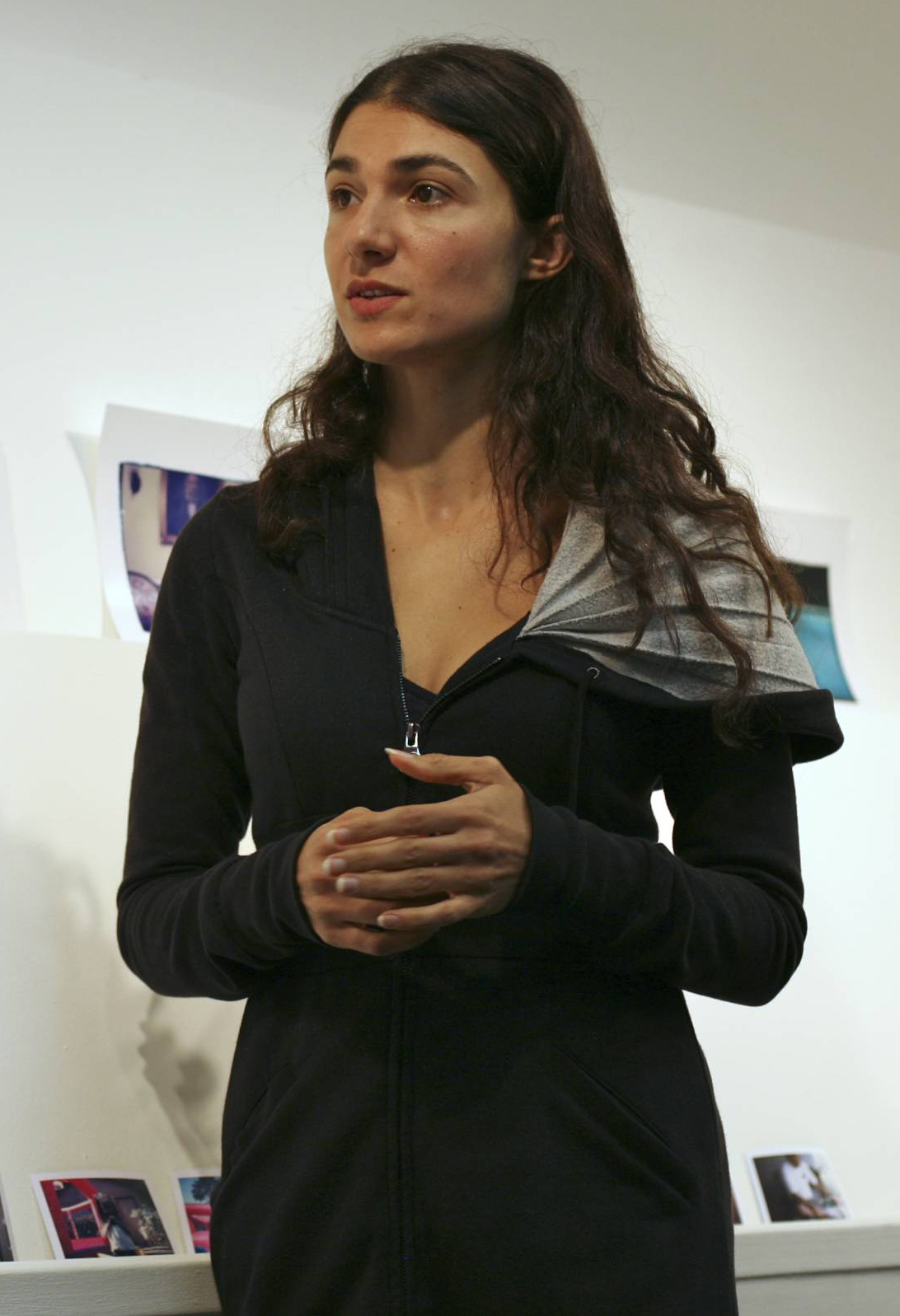
- Carucci in 2008
- Born: 1971 (age 54–55); Jerusalem, Israel
- Citizenship: Israel, United States
- Education: Jerusalem Academy of Music and Dance, Bezalel Academy of Arts and Design
- Known for: Photography
- Children: 2
- Awards: Guggenheim Fellowship, ICP
- Website: www.elinorcarucci.com

Elinor Carucci (born 1971) is an Israeli-born American photographer and educator, based in New York City, noted for her intimate portrayals of her family's lives, emotions, relationships, and identity. She has published five monographs; Closer (2002), Diary of a Dancer (2005), Mother (2013, Midlife (2019) and The Collars of RBG (2023). She teaches at the School of Visual Arts and at Hunter College in New York. Carucci's work is held in the collections of the Museum of Modern Art, Jewish Museum and Brooklyn Museum in New York, Houston Museum of Fine Arts, and Harwood Museum of Art in New Mexico. From 1995 to 2006, she also worked as a professional Middle Eastern dancer.

== Early life and education ==
Carucci was born in Jerusalem to a family of a North African and Bukhari descent. She studied classical Music at the Jerusalem Academy of Music and Dance, and then served in the Israeli Defense Forces for two years. She graduated in 1995 from Bezalel Academy of Arts and Design with a degree in photography and moved to New York City.

== Teaching ==
She currently teaches in the graduate program of photography at the School of Visual Arts and at Hunter College .

== Photography ==
Carucci told an interviewer that she tries to find universal meaning in things that are personal to her. She admires the work of Mary Ellen Mark and Sally Mann, who embody what she calls two opposite extremes in her own work: Some of her photographs are spontaneous snapshots, like Mark's while other images are carefully staged, more like Mann's.

=== Closer ===
Carucci's first monograph, Closer, contains her earlier work focusing on immediate family and her closest relationships.

It explores the complexities of intimacy, identity, and familial relationships, as well as early romantic ones, through images of human situations and tight close-ups.

=== Diary of a Dancer ===
Her second monograph, Diary of a Dancer (2005), documents Carucci's experience as a professional Middle-Eastern belly dancer entertaining at events like weddings and bar/bat mitzvahs in the five boroughs of New York City. Her husband, Eran, helped her to capture photographs of herself dancing. The images in this series depict Carucci preparing for jobs and applying makeup in dismal looking bathrooms and on subway rides, snapshots of her dancing and images of the people she was entertaining.

=== Crisis ===
Crisis (2001–2003) narrates a tumultuous time in her marriage. Taking place at a time when she and her husband were working through her infidelity and mind-body induced physical pain and his marijuana usage, these photographs look straight into the darkness of post-arguments, as well as at their tender moments. Carucci has described how photographing this process brought them closer together, as they ultimately demonstrated to each other in the taking of these photographs that their love for one another is held above all else. Photographing was a way of reconnecting.

A Time Lightbox article from 2013 summarizes the work as chronicling

"her tumultuous relationship with her husband and parents through incidents of infidelity (hers) too much dope (her husband’s) and her parents fractious relationship and eventual divorce. The mood was gentle, though, with plenty of high notes; the everyday ebb and flow of relationships were lovingly and lavishly documented, while the larger narratives played out in the background."

=== Mother ===
Carucci's third monograph, Mother (2013), "documents ten years of New York City-based child rearing." Beginning during the pregnancy of her twins and ending when they turn eight years old, she explores the complex realities of motherhood in images that show her joys and the pains, the beautiful and the ugly, and the love and dysfunctions. Mother also shed light on the sensual and erotic connections between mother and child in photographs reflecting the range of Carucci's experience, from bliss to the less attractive raw moments.

=== Midlife ===
Midlife (2011–2019) chronicles the years of middle of life, a time that is overlooked by our culture and society, especially in women's life. It explores themes of women's bodies and health, intergenerational relationship, love and marriage over decades, children getting older, and brings attention to the beauty and challenges of this period of time in women's life.

Collars of RBG: A Portrait of Justice

Through photographs of Ruth Bader Ginsburg’s iconic collars and the stories behind them, The Collars of Ruth Bader Ginsburg explores how her choices of adornment expressed her identity, her position as a woman on the Supreme Court, and her voice on significant judicial decisions. By bringing together these photographs and stories, the book creates an intimate and multifaceted portrait of Ginsburg, revealing how something as personal as a collar could become a powerful form of self-expression and representation during her historic tenure on the United States Supreme Court, with quotes and photographs of her collars.

== Publications ==
- Closer. San Francisco: Chronicle, 2002. ISBN 9780811834940.
  - Chronicle, 2009. ISBN 9780811870443 . Second edition. With a foreword by Susan Kismaric. 80 photographs.
- Diary of a Dancer. SteidlMack, 2005. ISBN 978-3865211552.
- Mother. Prestel, 2013. ISBN 978-3791348155.
- Midlife. Monacelli, 2019. ISBN 978-1-58093-529-6. With a foreword by Kristen Roupenian.
- Collars of RBG: A Portrait of Justice, Clarkson Potter, 2023. ISBN 978-0-593-58078-3

== Exhibitions ==
=== Solo exhibitions ===
- 1999: Print Room, The Photographers' Gallery, London
- 2005: It's me, Herzliya Museum of Contemporary Art, Herzlia, Israel
- 2010: My Children, Centre pour la Fotografie Contemporaine Le Bleu du Ciel, Lyon
- 2014: Mother, Edwynn Houk Gallery, New York
- 2018: Getting Closer Becoming Mother; About Intimacy and Family 1993–2012, Cortona On The Move festival, main artist show, Cortona, Italy
- 2020: Elinor Carucci – Sheltering in Place: A Photographer’s Diary of Life in Isolation, the gallery of the University of Central Missouri, Warrensburg, MO
- 2021 – The Ruth Bader Ginsburg Collars, St. Lawrence University Museum, Canton, New York.
- 2023 – RBG Collars: Photographs by Elinor Carucci, The Jewish Museum, New York.
- 2023 – The Collars of RBG, Edwynn Houk Gallery, New York.

=== Group exhibitions ===
- 2010–2011: Pictures by Women: a History of Modern Photography, Museum of Modern Art, New York, May 2010 – April 2011
- 2011: Insight, Fotomuseum Antwerp, Antwerp, Belgium, August–September 2011. With Alexandra Cool, Jacques Sonck and Elke Andreas Boon.
- 2023 – Framing the Female Gaze, Lehman College Art Gallery, New York.
- 2023 – This Is New York: 100 Years of the City in Art and Pop Culture, Museum of the City of New York.
- 2025 – How Wondrous the Other Through the Artist's Glance, Gallery FIFTY ONE, Antwerp.
- 2026 – The Coming of Age, Wellcome Collection, London.

== Awards ==
- 2000: "Thirty under 30 Young Photographers to Watch", Photo District News
- 2001: Winner, Best Young Photographer, Infinity Award, International Center of Photography, New York
- 2002: Guggenheim Fellowship, John Simon Guggenheim Memorial Foundation
- 2010: Artists' Fellowship, New York Foundation for the Arts, New York

== Collections ==
Carucci's work is held in the following permanent collections:

- Museum of Modern Art, New York: 2 prints (as of 31 August 2023)
- Jewish Museum, New York
- Brooklyn Museum
- Houston Museum of Fine Arts
- Harwood Museum of Art, New Mexico
- Fotomuseum Antwerp, Antwerp
