= Bernard Lerer =

Israeli psychiatrist and researcher

- ברנרד לרר
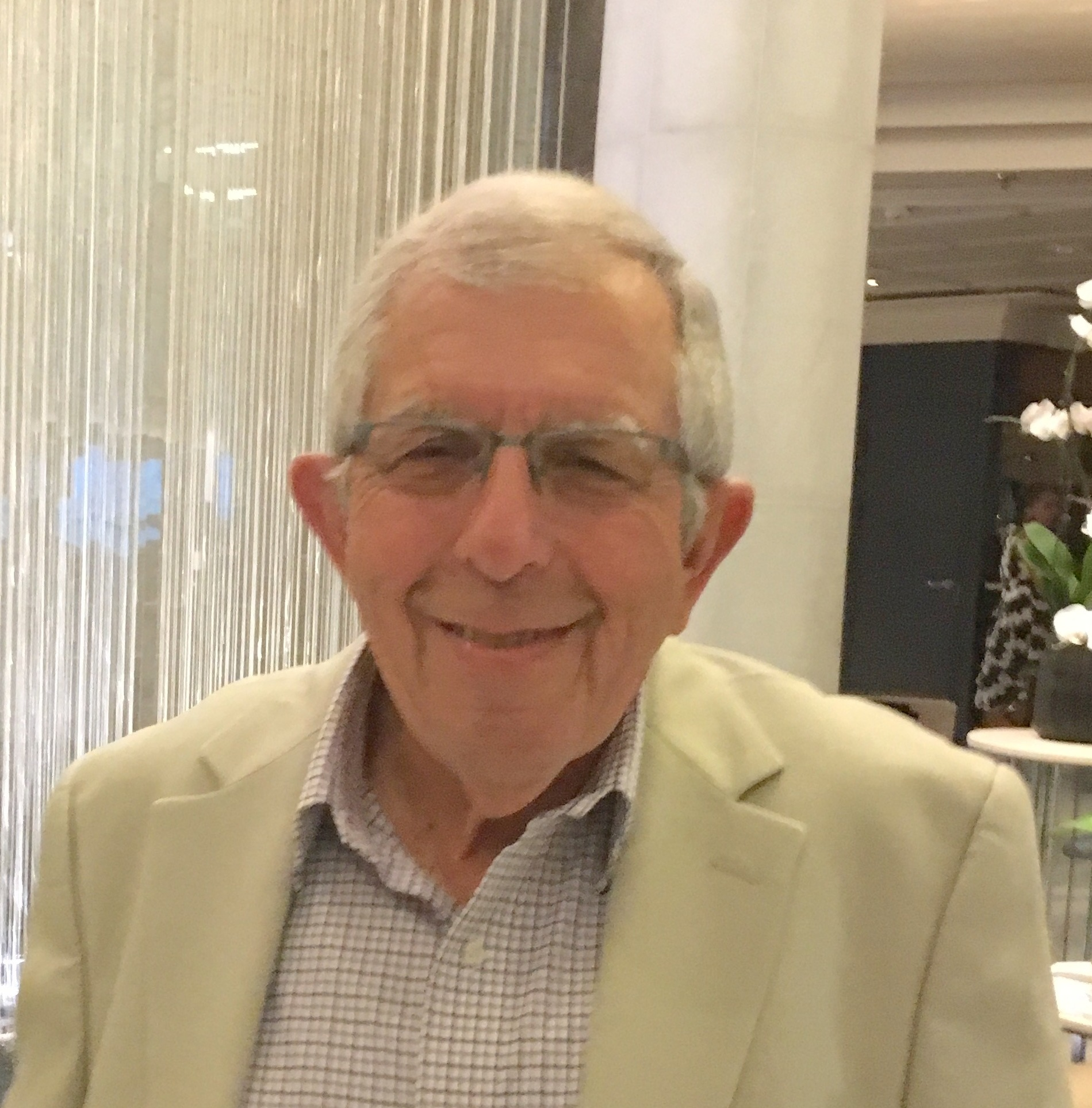
- Occupations: Psychiatrist, researcher, academic and author

Academic background
- Education: University of Cape Town

Bernard Lerer (Hebrew: ברנרד לרר) is an Israeli psychiatrist, researcher, academic and author. He is Professor of Psychiatry at the Hebrew University Hadassah Medical Center, Jerusalem, and Director of the Hadassah BrainLabs Center for Psychedelic Research.

Lerer's research focuses on understanding the biological basis of severe psychiatric disorders and developing safer, more effective treatments, particularly through novel pharmacological approaches and brain stimulation, and investigating the mechanisms of electroconvulsive therapy for depression. He has received the AE Bennet Award of the US Society of Biological Psychiatry (1984), the Distinguished Mentor Award of the Israel Society for Biological Psychiatry (2012), the Pacific Rim Association for Clinical Pharmacogenetics Werner Kalow Prize (2014), the Israel Psychiatric Association Lifetime Achievement Award (2015), and the Lifetime Achievement Award of the International Society for Affective Disorders (2019).

== Early life and education ==
Lerer was born in South Africa, completed medical school at the University of Cape Town and residency in psychiatry at Hadassah Medical Center in Jerusalem. Following a period of research training at Herzog Hospital in Jerusalem with Haim Belmaker, he became a post-doctoral research fellow in biological psychiatry and psychopharmacology at Wayne State University, Detroit under the mentorship of Samuel Gershon.

== Career ==
Lerer began his academic career as an instructor in the Department of Psychiatry at Hebrew University Hadassah Medical School from 1976 to 1979, then became a lecturer from 1979 to 1984, senior lecturer from 1984 to 1986, and associate professor from 1986 to 1991, since when he has been serving as a professor. Concurrently, he also held positions at Wayne State University (1982–1984) and the University of Miami Miller School of Medicine (2008–2009).

Lerer assumed leadership roles at hospitals, initially heading the clinical psychiatry department at Herzog Hospital in 1984 and subsequently directing the hospital's research laboratory. By 1990, he had established the Biological Psychiatry Laboratory at Hadassah, while also serving as a clinical unit chief in the Department of Psychiatry. In 2013, he co-founded the Hadassah BrainLabs, National Knowledge Center for Research on Brain Disorders, and in 2023, the Hadassah BrainLabs, Center for Psychedelic Research.

Lerer served as academic chair of the Department of Psychiatry at the Hebrew University and as vice dean of the Faculty of Medicine from 2000 to 2002. He has been the founder and chair of the Israel Society for Biological Psychiatry, the founding editor of the International Journal of Neuropsychopharmacology, and director of the National Institute for Psychobiology in Israel.

== Research ==
Lerer has contributed to the field of psychiatry by studying the genetic basis of psychiatric disorders, particularly schizophrenia, psychopharmacogenetics, the mechanisms of antidepressants and electroconvulsive therapy (ECT), the long-term effects of early life stress, and optimizing ECT.

=== Genetics and pharmacogenetics of psychiatric disorders ===
Lerer's work led to several findings in the genetics and pharmacogenetics of psychiatric disorders, including the identification of Ahi1 as a gene contributing to schizophrenia susceptibility. He edited the first book on the pharmacogenetics of psychiatric disorders, titled Pharmacogenetics of Psychotropic Drugs. Viewing gene-environment interaction as a key to the pathogenesis of psychiatric disorders, he conducted several studies in this area and, in 1999, published a widely cited paper on the role of early parental loss in susceptibility to depression and other psychiatric disorders.

=== Thyroid hormone and antidepressants ===
Lerer analyzed the potential role of thyroid hormone in augmenting antidepressant action, conducting preclinical studies on this topic. In 2007, he published a randomized controlled trial in depressed patients demonstrating the efficacy of triiodothyronine (T3) augmentation of antidepressant effects.

=== Psychedelic drugs ===
Later in his career, Lerer shifted his focus towards the potential role of psychedelic drugs and psychedelic derived neuroplastogens in treating therapy resistant psychiatric disorders. He established a research group devoted to this topic. His efforts have yielded several original papers including one that explored the pharmacology of the head twitch response, a rodent correlate of the psychedelic trip in humans, one that analyzed the pharmacological mechanisms underlying the anti-obsessive effects of psychedelics and a study that differentiated the effect of psilocybin and psilocybin-containing mushroom extract on neuroplasticity.

Working with medicinal chemists, Lerer has designed and synthesized novel, non-hallucinogenic psychedelic-derived compounds. The treatment approaches he and his group have developed include a novel non-hallucinogenic treatment approach for chronic schizophrenia that is based on an original hypothesis and combines 5-HT2A and NMDA receptor agonism.

== Awards and honors ==
- 1984 – AE Bennet Award, US Society of Biological Psychiatry
- 2012 – Distinguished Mentor Award, Israel Society for Biological Psychiatry
- 2014 – Werner Kalow Prize, Pacific Rim Association for Clinical Pharmacogenetics
- 2015 – Lifetime Achievement Award, Israel Psychiatric Association
- 2019 – Lifetime Achievement Award, International Society for Affective Disorders

== Bibliography ==
=== Books ===
- ECT: Basic Mechanisms (1984) ISBN 978-0880482370
- New Directions in Affective Disorders (1989) ISBN 978-1461281405
- Pharmacogenetics of Psychotropic Drugs (2002) ISBN 978-0521806176
- Evidence-based Psychopharmacology (2005) ISBN 978-0521531887

=== Selected articles ===
- Agid, O., Shapira, B., Zislin, J., Ritsner, M., Hanin, B., Murad, H., Troudart, T., Bloch, M., Heresco-Levy, U., & Lerer, B. (1999). Environment and vulnerability to major psychiatric illness: a case control study of early parental loss in major depression, bipolar disorder and schizophrenia. Molecular psychiatry, 4(2), 163–172.
- Lerer, B., Segman, R. H., Fangerau, H., Daly, A. K., Basile, V. S., Cavallaro, R., ... & Macciardi, F. (2002). Pharmacogenetics of tardive dyskinesia: combined analysis of 780 patients supports association with dopamine D3 receptor gene Ser9Gly polymorphism. Neuropsychopharmacology, 27(1), 105–119.
- Schwab, S. G., Knapp, M., Mondabon, S., Hallmayer, J., Borrmann-Hassenbach, M., Albus, M., ... & Wildenauer, D. B. (2003). Support for association of schizophrenia with genetic variation in the 6p22. 3 gene, dysbindin, in sib-pair families with linkage and in an additional sample of triad families. The American Journal of Human Genetics, 72(1), 185–190.
- Maes, M., Yirmyia, R., Noraberg, J., Brene, S., Hibbeln, J., Perini, G., ... & Maj, M. (2009). The inflammatory & neurodegenerative (I&ND) hypothesis of depression: leads for future research and new drug developments in depression. Metabolic brain disease, 24, 27–53.
- Pantelis, C., Papadimitriou, G. N., Papiol, S., Parkhomenko, E., Pato, M. T., Paunio, T., ... & O'Donovan, M. C. (2014). Biological insights from 108 schizophrenia-associated genetic loci. Nature, 511(7510), 421–427.
