= Clinical neuroscience =

Branch of neuroscience

Clinical neuroscience is a branch of neuroscience that focuses on the scientific study of fundamental mechanisms that underlie diseases and disorders of the brain and central nervous system. It seeks to develop new ways of conceptualizing and diagnosing such disorders and ultimately of developing novel treatments.

A clinical neuroscientist is a scientist who has specialized knowledge in the field. Not all clinicians are clinical neuroscientists. Clinicians and scientists -including psychiatrists, neurologists, clinical psychologists, neuroscientists, and other specialists—use basic research findings from neuroscience in general and clinical neuroscience in particular to develop diagnostic methods and ways to prevent and treat neurobiological disorders. Such disorders include addiction, Alzheimer's disease, amyotrophic lateral sclerosis, anxiety disorders, attention deficit hyperactivity disorder, autism, bipolar disorder, brain tumors, depression, Down syndrome, dyslexia, epilepsy, Huntington's disease, multiple sclerosis, neurological AIDS, neurological trauma, pain, obsessive-compulsive disorder, Parkinson's disease, schizophrenia, sleep disorders, stroke and Tourette syndrome.

While neurology, neurosurgery and psychiatry are the main medical specialties that use neuroscientific information, other specialties such as cognitive neuroscience, neuroradiology, neuropathology, ophthalmology, otorhinolaryngology, anesthesiology and rehabilitation medicine can contribute to the discipline. Integration of the neuroscience perspective alongside other traditions like psychotherapy, social psychiatry or social psychology will become increasingly important.

== One Mind for Research ==
The "One Mind for Research" forum was a convention held in Boston, Massachusetts on May 23–25, 2011 that produced the blueprint document A Ten-Year Plan for Neuroscience: From Molecules to Brain Health. Leading neuroscience researchers and practitioners in the United States contributed to the creation of this document, in which 17 key areas of opportunities are listed under the Clinical Neuroscience section. These include the following:

- Rethinking curricula to break down intellectual silos
- Training translational neuroscientists and clinical investigators
- Investigating biomarkers
- Improving psychiatric diagnosis
- Developing a "Framingham Study of Brain Disorders" (i.e. longitudinal cohort for central nervous system disease)
- Identifying developmental risk factors and producing effective interventions
- Discovering new treatments for pain, including neuropathic pain
- Treating disorders of neural signaling and pathological synchrony
- Treating disorders of immunity or inflammation
- Treating metabolic and mitochondrial disorders
- Developing new treatments for depression
- Treating addictive disorders
- Improving treatment of schizophrenia
- Preventing and treating cerebrovascular disease
- Achieving personalized medicine
- Understanding shared mechanisms of neurodegeneration
- Advancing anesthesia

In particular, it advocates for better integrated and scientifically driven curricula for practitioners, and it recommends that such curricula be shared among neurologists, psychiatrists, psychologists, neurosurgeons and neuroradiologists.

Given the various ethical, legal and societal implications for healthcare practitioners arising from advances in neuroscience, the University of Pennsylvania inaugurated the Penn Conference on Clinical Neuroscience and Society in July 2011.

To translate more neuroscience knowledge into Clinical Applications, the Zeitgeist University inaugurated the Clinical Neuroscience Phd in July 2018.

== Similarities between Other Fields of Neuroscience ==
=== Neuropsychology ===
Neuropsychology and clinical neuroscience are both subfields of neuroscience. While clinical neuroscience is more focused on the anatomy and how the brain would react to specific types of disorders and how to prevent them, clinical neuropsychology is more focused on how the brain functions and understands behaviors.) Both fields contribute to the prevention of mental disorders, diagnosing disorders of the brain, and assessing cognitive and mental behaviors.

Neuropsychologists focus on the clinical aspect of these afflictions. It is a research intensive discipline, requiring extensive knowledge in the field of psychology. Most neuropsychologists have acquired their Doctoral Degree's due to how research extensive the topic may be, making the field extremely competitive in the job market.

Progress into Neuropsychology is equivalent to becoming a therapist if not equally time investing.

=== Neuropsychiatry ===
Neuropsychiatry is a field that connects the mind and the brain, looking at how both affect each other. It combines ideas from both neurology (the study of the brain and nervous system) and psychiatry (the study of mental health), and focuses on treating problems related to thinking, emotions, and behavior that come from brain disorders.

Rather than focusing on just one part of a problem (like a specific brain issue or mental health symptom), neuropsychiatry takes a broader approach. It attempts to bridge the gap between the physical affliction that a person may have and the effect on their behavior. For example, it recognizes that many brain disorders can affect mood or thinking, and many mental health conditions (like depression or schizophrenia) have a neurological aspect.

== See also ==
- Behavioral neurology
- Neuropsychiatry
- Neuropsychology
- Society for Neuroscience
- Cognitive neuroscience
