= The Journal of Neuropsychiatry and Clinical Neurosciences =

Academic journal

- Discipline: Neuropsychiatry
- Language: English
- Edited by: David B. Arciniegas

Publication details
- History: 1989–present
- Publisher: American Psychiatric Association
- Frequency: Quarterly
- Impact factor: 2.192 (2020)

Standard abbreviations
- ISO 4: J. Neuropsychiatry Clin. Neurosci.

Indexing
- ISSN: 0895-0172 (print); 1545-7222 (web)
- LCCN: 89660023
- OCLC no.: 610402183

Links
- Journal homepage; Online access; Online archive

The Journal of Neuropsychiatry and Clinical Neurosciences is a quarterly peer-reviewed medical journal in the field of neuropsychiatry. It was established in 1989 by Stuart Yudofsky and Robert Hales, with its first issue published that winter. It has been the official journal of the American Neuropsychiatric Association since 1991. It is published by the American Psychiatric Association and the Editor is David B. Arciniegas, MD, FANPA (University of New Mexico School of Medicine). According to the Journal Citation Reports, the journal has a 2020 impact factor of 2.192. The publisher reports a journal H-index of 104, with more than 62,000 citations to articles published in the journal and an average of over 18 citations per item.
