= Cat Person =

2017 short story by Kristen Roupenian

- Short story by Kristen Roupenian
- Lead image of the story, by Elinor Carucci
- Country: United States
- Language: English
- Genre: Fiction

Publication
- Published in: The New Yorker
- Publication date: December 2017

"Cat Person" is a short story by Kristen Roupenian that was first published in December 2017 in The New Yorker before going viral online. The BBC described the short story as "being shared widely online as social media users discuss how much it relates to modern-day dating".

The story has been adapted to a film of the same name directed by Susanna Fogel.

== Synopsis ==
The story follows the brief relationship of Margot, a twenty-year-old sophomore college student, and Robert, a thirty-four-year-old man who is a regular at the movie theater where Margot works. After an exchange at the concession stand, he asks for her number, and they carry on extensive conversations through texts. Margot finds Robert witty and funny through text, and their conversations grow frequent, including running jokes about Robert's two pet cats, but he is more awkward and inscrutable when she tries to see him in person.

When Margot returns from visiting home for winter break, she and Robert go on a real date: they see a movie, go to a bar (during which Robert learns her age), and then return to Robert's home. Despite being disappointed and uncomfortable during the date, Margot consents to sex with Robert rather than navigate turning him down. After the distasteful sex encounter, which largely disgusts her, Margot learns that Robert is thirty-four years old and reflects that their conversations have been impersonal. After not seeing Robert's cats in his home, she wonders if their existence and other aspects of Robert's persona while texting were fabricated.

Margot resolves to tell Robert she is not interested in continuing to see him but ignores his messages while she is unsure of how to do it politely but firmly. Her roommate eventually impersonates her in the break-up text. A month later, she sees Robert while out at a bar with her friends; she is unsettled by the idea that he is looking for her and avoids him. That night, he texts her repeatedly, his messages at first insecure and politely questioning if she was with a new boyfriend but becoming more needy, jealous and belligerent as Margot does not reply, ending with calling her "Whore."

== Reception ==
The Washington Post described "Cat Person" as unique among the content in The New Yorker because it resonated with a younger audience, commenting: "for one of the first times, something in the magazine seemed to capture the experience not of print-oriented, older intellectuals, but of Millennials." The story was the year's most downloaded fiction published in The New Yorker, and one of the most-read pieces overall of 2017. The Atlantic notes that "The depiction of uncomfortable romance in 'Cat Person' seems to resonate with countless women", and describes it as a "literary adjunct to the latest #MeToo moment". Personal reactions have been largely, but not entirely, along gender lines (drawing comparisons to Jane Austen), and for many readers, it captures what it is like to be a woman in her twenties in 2017, including "the desperate need to be considered polite and nice at all costs".

Following the story's success, Roupenian secured a seven-figure deal with Scout Press for her debut book, and was the subject of a bidding war in the American market, with offers exceeding $1 million. She received a $1.2 million advance for her 2019 book You Know You Want This, an anthology series which includes "Cat Person".

== Real-life inspiration ==
In July 2021, Alexis Nowicki published an essay in Slate magazine alleging that Roupenian had appropriated details from Nowicki's life and that of her ex-boyfriend, and used them for "Cat Person", with Margot representing Nowicki and Robert representing Nowicki's former partner, only identified in the essay by the pseudonym "Charles". Nowicki's essay points out salient differences between "Cat Person" and her relationship. Elisabeth de Mariaffi notes that "the entire weight of Cat Person, what made it resonate, was exactly the part that Nowicki says bears no resemblance to the truth." In contrast to the action of "Cat Person," Nowicki categorized her relationship with "Charles" as generally positive and said that the two had remained friends following an amicable breakup, and that she had only come forward following Charles' "sudden death" at 35 years old.

Social media users reacted strongly to Nowicki's allegations. In the words of Elisabeth de Mariaffi, in Maclean's, "Twitter went wild, with readers struggling to understand how a writer could justify using such real-life details, and writers rallying to defend themselves." The Guardian writer Rhiannon Lucy Cosslett described the potential for readers to feel that "using someone else's story in this way was unethical."

In a 2021 email reply to Nowicki, Roupenian said she had an "encounter" with Charles and that she later found out about Nowicki through social media. Roupenian acknowledged that information she learned from Nowicki's social media served as a "jumping-off point" for "a story that was primarily a work of the imagination, but which also drew on my own personal experiences, both past and present." She apologized for not changing particulars such as Nowicki's hometown, stating "I can absolutely see why the inclusion of those details in the story would cause you significant pain and confusion." Nowicki expressed some sympathy with Roupenian, stating that she believed the author had been unprepared for the story's viral success.
