= The International Journal of Neuropsychopharmacology =

International Journal of Neuropsychopharmacology
- Discipline: Neuropharmacology, psychopharmacology
- Language: English
- Edited by: Anthony Grace

Publication details
- History: 1998–present
- Publisher: Oxford University Press
- Frequency: 12/year
- Open access: Yes
- Impact factor: 4.5 (2023)

Standard abbreviations
- ISO 4: Int. J. Neuropsychopharmacol.

Indexing
- CODEN: IJNUFB
- ISSN: 1461-1457 (print); 1469-5111 (web)
- LCCN: 00243167
- OCLC no.: 43807343

Links
- Journal homepage; Online archive

The International Journal of Neuropsychopharmacology is a peer-reviewed scientific journal published by Oxford University Press. It is an official journal of the Collegium Internationale Neuro-Psychopharmacologicum (CINP) (International College of Neuro-Psychopharmacology) and covers basic and clinical topics in neuropharmacology and psychopharmacology. It was established in 1998 by Bernard Lerer, who served as editor-in-chief until 2008.
