= You Know You Want This =

2019 book by Kristen Roupenian

- First edition
- Author: Kristen Roupenian
- Published: January 15, 2019
- Publisher: Gallery/Scout Press

You Know You Want This: "Cat Person" and Other Stories is a collection of short stories by Kristen Roupenian.

Following the viral success of the short story "Cat Person", Roupenian secured a seven-figure deal with Scout Press for her debut book, and was the subject of a bidding war in the American market, with offers exceeding $1m. She received a $1.2 million advance for the book.

== Contents ==
You Know You Want This contains the following short stories:

- Bad Boy
- Look at Your Game, Girl
- Sardines
- The Night Runner
- The Mirror, the Bucket, and the Old Thigh Bone
- Cat Person
- The Good Guy
- The Boy in the Pool
- Scarred
- The Matchbox Sign
- Death Wish
- Biter
