= The Spy Who Dumped Me =

2018 American action comedy film

- Theatrical release poster
- Directed by: Susanna Fogel
- Written by: Susanna Fogel; David Iserson
- Produced by: Brian Grazer; Erica Huggins
- Starring: Mila Kunis; Kate McKinnon; Justin Theroux; Sam Heughan
- Cinematography: Barry Peterson
- Edited by: Jonathan Schwartz
- Music by: Tyler Bates
- Production companies: Imagine Entertainment; Bron Studios
- Distributed by: Lionsgate
- Release date: August 3, 2018 (United States)
- Running time: 117 minutes
- Country: United States
- Language: English
- Budget: $40 million
- Box office: $75.3 million

The Spy Who Dumped Me is a 2018 American action comedy film directed by Susanna Fogel and co-written by Fogel and David Iserson. The film stars Mila Kunis, Kate McKinnon, Justin Theroux, Sam Heughan, Hasan Minhaj, and Gillian Anderson and follows two best friends who are chased by assassins through Europe after one of their ex-boyfriends turns out to be a CIA agent. The title is a play on the James Bond film The Spy Who Loved Me, and Austin Powers: The Spy Who Shagged Me.

The film was shot in Amsterdam, Berlin and Budapest from July to September 2017. It was released in the United States on August 3, 2018, by Lionsgate and grossed more than $75 million, while receiving mixed reviews from critics, who questioned the film's intended genre and tone but praised the performances.

== Plot ==
In Los Angeles, cashier Audrey Stockman spends her birthday upset after her boyfriend Drew dumps her. Her best friend and roommate, Morgan Freeman, convinces her to burn his things and texts him beforehand as a warning. Unbeknowst to Audrey, Drew is a government agent being pursued by men trying to kill him. He promises to return and asks her to not torch anything in the meantime.

At work, Audrey flirts with a man who asks her to walk him to his car. Forced into a van, the man identifies himself as Sebastian Henshaw. He reveals that Drew works for the Central Intelligence Agency (CIA) and has gone missing. Audrey claims not to have heard from him and is let go.

Drew shows up for his possessions, including a fantasy football trophy. People begin shooting at them and he tells Audrey that, if he dies, she must go to a certain café in Vienna and give the trophy to his contact. Drew is then shot by a man Morgan had taken home from a bar, whom she then pushes off the balcony.

Morgan convinces Audrey to go to Vienna. At the café, Sebastian appears and demands the trophy at gunpoint. Audrey reluctantly hands it over before the entire café is attacked. The friends flee, chased by men on motorcycles. Audrey reveals that she still has Drew's trophy as she had switched it with one of several decoys they had purchased for such an event.

Boarding a train to Prague, they discover Drew's trophy contains a USB card. Morgan calls her parents, who say they can stay in Prague with their family friend, Roger.

Audrey and Morgan get to the apartment, but discover "Roger" is actually a spy who drugged them and killed the real Roger. Morgan tries to swallow the flash drive. After that fails, Audrey tells their captors that she flushed it down the toilet.

The ladies wake up in an abandoned gymnastics training facility, about to be tortured by Nadejda, a Russian gymnast, model, and assassin trained by the older couple who had previously masqueraded as Drew's parents. Audrey and Morgan are rescued by Sebastian, who defied orders to save them. He brings them to his boss in Paris, where they once again tell the CIA and MI6 that the drive was flushed. The women are given tickets to return to America, while Sebastian is suspended.

Driving back to the airport, Sebastian explains that Drew's "parents" are actually notorious criminals. Drew was discreetly negotiating with them on the sale of the USB card, and Audrey was part of his cover. Audrey confesses that she had actually hidden the drive in her vagina. When Sebastian cannot decrypt the information on the card, Morgan calls her old Summer camp friend Edward Snowden for assistance; he helps them hack it.

The trio travel to a hostel in Amsterdam and are attacked by Sebastian's CIA partner Duffer, who plans to sell the drive himself. They are rescued by their hostel roommate, who thinks they are being robbed and body slams Duffer to his death. Audrey answers Duffer's phone when it rings and agrees to sell the drive at a private party in Berlin.

To get into the buyer, Audrey and Sebastian disguise themselves as the Canadian ambassador and his wife, while Morgan joins the Cirque du Soleil crew. Sebastian is attacked and Morgan is confronted by Nadejda on an acrobat swing, eventually killing her. Meanwhile, Audrey meets her mysterious contact and finds Drew, who is still alive and searches through her purse for the USB. Sebastian arrives, held hostage by Drew's "parents".

After a standoff, Drew's "parents" are shot, leaving Sebastian and Drew, who accuse each other of trying to hurt Audrey. Drew then shoots Sebastian, and Audrey pretends to be glad before grabbing his gun. When he tries to attack her, she kicks him in the groin. Once he is on the ground, Morgan throws a cannonball at him. Drew is arrested, and Audrey, Morgan, and Sebastian escape.

Sebastian later gives Morgan his untraceable phone to let her parents know she is alive. As she is talking, Sebastian's boss calls to lift his suspension. Morgan begs her for a job as a spy. Meanwhile, Sebastian and Audrey kiss.

A year later, Audrey's birthday is celebrated in Tokyo. However, her party is revealed to be a ruse, as it is actually an assignment with Sebastian to stop Japanese Yakuza gangsters.

== Cast ==
- Mila Kunis as Audrey
- Kate McKinnon as Morgan
- Justin Theroux as Drew
- Gillian Anderson as Wendy
- Jane Curtin as Carol
- Hasan Minhaj as Duffer
- Ivanna Sakhno as Nadedja
- Sam Heughan as Sebastian
- Kev Adams as Bitteauto Driver Lukas
- James Fleet as Tom
- Fred Melamed as Roger
- Carolyn Pickles as Marsha

== Production ==
Principal photography began in Budapest, Hungary in July 2017. Filming also took place in Amsterdam that September, wrapping the same month.

== Release ==
The Spy Who Dumped Me premiered at Regency Village Theater in Los Angeles on July 25, 2018. The film was originally scheduled to be released on July 6, 2018, but after "a phenomenal test screening" it was pushed back a month to August 3, 2018, in order to avoid a crowded July frame.

=== Home media ===
The Spy Who Dumped Me was released on DVD and Blu-ray on October 30, 2018, by Lionsgate Home Entertainment.

== Reception ==
=== Box office ===
The Spy Who Dumped Me grossed $33.6 million in the United States and Canada, as well as $41.7 million in other territories, for a total worldwide gross of $75.3 million, against a production budget of $40 million.

In the United States and Canada, The Spy Who Dumped Me was released alongside Christopher Robin, The Darkest Minds and Death of a Nation: Can We Save America a Second Time?, and was projected to gross $10–15 million from 3,111 theaters in its opening weekend. The film made $5 million on its first day, including $950,000 from Thursday night previews. It went on to debut to $12.4 million, finishing third at the box office, behind holdover Mission: Impossible – Fallout and Christopher Robin. It fell 45% to $6.6 million in its second weekend, finishing sixth.

=== Critical response ===
On the review aggregator website Rotten Tomatoes, 49% of 208 critics' reviews are positive, with an average rating of 5.3/10. The website's consensus reads: "The Spy Who Dumped Me isn't the funniest or most inventive spy comedy, but Kate McKinnon remains as compulsively watchable as ever." Metacritic, which uses a weighted average, assigned the film a score of 52 out of 100, based on 43 critics, indicating "mixed or average" reviews.

Variety's Owen Gleiberman praised McKinnon's performance but criticized the film for favoring violence over comedy, writing that it is "a movie that can't seem to decide whether it wants to be a light comedy caper or a top-heavy exercise in B-movie mega-violence." Barbara VanDenburgh of The Arizona Republic gave the film 2 out of 5 stars, calling it "tonally incongruous… a buddy comedy, a spy drama, a raunch fest, a thrilling action film… that it doesn't have the focus to do any of those things particularly well". Rolling Stone's Peter Travers criticized the film, similarly rating it 2 out of 5 stars. He stated that the film "spends way too much time on car chases, shootouts, knife fights and R-rated violence that doesn't square with the film's comic agenda" and "painfully unfunny—it criminally wastes the comic talents of Kate McKinnon".

Richard Brody of The New Yorker praised the film, stating, "Mila Kunis and Kate McKinnon riff gleefully in the ample and precise framework of Susanna Fogel's effervescent action comedy", while Justin Chang of the Los Angeles Times also gave it a positive review, writing that it is, "a fast, funny Europe-trotting buddy caper". Johnny Oleksinski of the New York Post opined it was nice to see McKinnon used properly in a film, and that Kunis was the ideal straight woman, calling the two a smart match.

=== Accolades ===
Awards	Date of ceremony	Category	Recipient(s)	Result	Ref.
People's Choice Awards	November 11, 2018	Favorite Comedy Movie	The Spy Who Dumped Me	Won	
People's Choice Awards	November 11, 2018	Favorite Comedic Movie Actress	Mila Kunis	Nominated	
