= Life Partners =

2014 film by Susanna Fogel

- Theatrical release poster
- Directed by: Susanna Fogel
- Written by: Susanna Fogel; Joni Lefkowitz
- Produced by: Brendan Bragg; Jordana Mollick; Joni Lefkowitz; Riva Marker; Daniela Taplin Lundberg
- Starring: Leighton Meester; Gillian Jacobs; Adam Brody; Abby Elliott; Mark Feuerstein; Gabourey Sidibe
- Cinematography: Brian Burgoyne
- Edited by: Kiran Pallegadda
- Music by: Eric D. Johnson
- Production companies: Black Sheep Entertainment; Minerva Productions; Sandia Media
- Distributed by: Magnolia Pictures
- Release dates: April 18, 2014 (Tribeca); December 5, 2014 (United States)
- Running time: 93 minutes
- Country: United States
- Language: English
- Box office: $8,265

Life Partners is a 2014 American romantic comedy drama film directed by Susanna Fogel and co-written with Joni Lefkowitz. It is Fogel's feature film directorial debut. The film stars Leighton Meester, Gillian Jacobs, Adam Brody, Greer Grammer, Gabourey Sidibe, and Julie White. The film premiered on April 18, 2014, at the Tribeca Film Festival in the Spotlight section. The film was released on demand platforms on November 6, 2014, and in select theaters on December 5, 2014.

== Plot ==
Paige, an environmental lawyer, and Sasha, a struggling musician working as a receptionist, are long-time best friends in their late 20s. Paige supports her lesbian friend in her LBGTQ rallies and they regularly watch TV shows together. After forcing themselves to try online dating one night, they go on separate dates. Sasha's ends in disaster, while Paige has a good date with Tim, a young and charming dermatologist. Sasha continues to have a string of bad dates and failed relationships, while Paige and Tim continue dating. When Paige has a big win at work, he whisks her off to a celebratory dinner, thwarting the surprise party Sasha had organised.

As Paige and Tim spend more and more time together, she is impressed with his thoughtfulness and her mother helps her coax him into improving his style. Sasha begins to feel excluded as Paige begins to focus more on Tim and their relationship. Even on Sasha's 29th birthday, when she and Paige are meant to spend the whole evening celebrating in a motel, his call disrupts the evening. Tim eventually surprises Paige with a proposal and she accepts. Paige begins to feel that Sasha is childish, as she hates the girls Sasha dates and does not think much of her lack of direction. She voices this to Tim but tries to be supportive of Sasha. The woman Sasha is seeing is another lesbian friend's ex, when the group finds out she is excluded. Then the woman in question moves on, and Paige goes over with it. At a barbecue that Paige and Tim host, they try to set up Sasha with a new lawyer in her firm, a woman they think of as kind and reliable. When Sasha is rude to her and blows her off, Paige and Sasha have a falling out and stop speaking to one another.

Sasha gets fired from her job over her poor performance, specifically by failing to send a bid to China when told to, losing a job for the company. She later runs into Tim, who is also having a difficult time in his relationship with Paige, who is constantly trying to control him and refuses to apologize. While there, Tim also tells Sasha that it is fine for her to give up on her dream of being a musician if that is no longer what she is passionate about. The conversation leaves Sasha with a better impression of Tim. After spending some time in a bridal shop with her domineering mother trying on wedding dresses, Paige realizes she learned to be too stubborn from her. She goes home and first finally admits to the neighbor that she's at fault for having run into his parked car days ago, then apologizes to Tim.

Sometime later, as Paige is out driving her car, she sees Sasha at the stop light ahead. They begin to honk and shout at each other in pretend anger, a joke that they played on one another when they were friends, to show that all is forgiven.

== Cast ==
- Leighton Meester as Sasha Weiss
- Gillian Jacobs as Paige Kearns
- Adam Brody as Tim
- Mark Feuerstein as Casey
- Julie White as Deborah
- Abby Elliott as Vanessa
- Greer Grammer as Mia
- Kate McKinnon as Trace
- Beth Dover as Jenn
- Gabourey Sidibe as Jen

== Production ==
Susanna Fogel and Joni Lefkowitz met in 2002 at a sketch comedy writing class and became friends. Lefkowitz and Fogel both starred in the 2008 web series Joni & Susanna.

The film is an adaptation of the play Life Partners, written by Lefkowitz and Fogel based on their friendship and similar to the one depicted in Walking and Talking by Nicole Holofcener. In 2011, the play, starring Amanda Walsh and Shannon Woodward, was created and premiered as part of one-act play series Unscreened, which develops and produces world-premiere short plays by some of Hollywood's fastest-rising writers and featuring multi-star casts. In the aftermath of its success, producer Jordana Mollick approached the pair to consider adapting the play into a feature.

Lefkowitz and Fogel first considered Kristen Bell and Evan Rachel Wood for the role of Sasha, but when they both became pregnant, the role was given to Leighton Meester. Magnolia Pictures acquired the US rights to the film on May 16, 2014.

=== Filming ===
Set in Minneapolis, Minnesota, principal photography began in April 2013 and lasted 19 days. The film was primarily shot in Glendale, California, and Eagle Rock, Los Angeles. Some scenes were shot at Griffith Park and at Long Beach, California, during the Long Beach Lesbian & Gay Pride. Other scenes were also filmed in Minneapolis, Minnesota. The Minneapolis skyline and a few Minneapolis landmarks are also shown in the film.

== Reception ==
=== Box office ===
Life Partners earned $8,265 in North America.

=== Critical reception ===
On Rotten Tomatoes, the film has an approval rating of 68%, based on 37 reviews, with an average rating of 6.10/10. The site's consensus reads: "With two appealing leads adrift in a sitcom-worthy plot, Life Partners doesn't do quite enough to earn viewers' commitment." On Metacritic, the film has a score of 57 out of 100, based on 15 critics, indicating "mixed or average" reviews.

Ronnie Scheib of Variety praised the lead performances: "Jacobs fully inhabits her less-than-completely-sympathetic role with warmth and just the right touch of unconscious entitlement, while Meester luminously expands the film's affective core." Frank Scheck of The Hollywood Reporter wrote: "Life Partners boasts a sweetly relaxed vibe that makes it go down easily thanks to the witty screenplay by Fogel and Joni Lefkowitz and the highly appealing performances by Leighton Meester (Gossip Girl) and Gillian Jacobs (Community)."
