= Psychodynamic models of emotional and behavioral disorders =

Psychodynamic models of emotional and behavioral disorders originated in a Freudian psychoanalytic theory which posits that emotional damage occurs when the child's need for safety, affection, acceptance, and self-esteem has been effectively thwarted by the parent (or primary caregiver).

The child becomes unable to function efficiently, cannot adapt to reasonable requirements of social regulation and convention, or is so plagued with inner conflict, anxiety, and guilt that they are unable to perceive reality clearly or meet the ordinary demands of the environment in which they live.

Karen Horney has postulated three potential character patterns stemming from these conditions: compliant and submissive behavior, and a need for love: arrogance, hostility, and a need for power; or social avoidance, withdrawal, and a need for independence.

== Theories ==
=== Psychoanalytic Theory: Freud ===
Sigmund Freud was a physician whose fascination with the emotional problems of his patients led him to develop a new branch of psychological theory. He found from his own experimental researching that the personality has three major systems of psychic energy: the id, the ego, and the superego. According to Freud, we all are born with what we call the id. The id is like “the kid in us.” It represents the inner world of subjective experience and has no knowledge of objective reality. It is said to operate for pleasure and reduce tension and pain. The ego is differentiated out of the id and develops out of a need to temper the subjective view of the id with the objective world of reality; it is the part of the id that has been modified by the external world. The superego represents the moral standards imposed upon a child by society, which are enforced by parents and other societal agents. It has two aspects: the positive (ego ideal), which rewards, and the negative (conscience), which punishes. The superego strives towards perfection. The next two tables have been produced by Freud as other theories:

Principle Defense Mechanisms of the Ego

I. Repression	Forcing alarming thoughts or feelings from conscious awareness
II. Projection	Attributing causes of negative impulses or feelings to the external world rather than to oneself
III. Reaction-Formation	Adopting the behavior or attitude opposite to what one really feels
IV. Fixation	Failing to pass into the next stage of psychosexual development or temporary flight from controlled and realistic thinking
V. Regression	The individual has his or her ego return to an earlier stage of development.

Adjustment Problems Based on Fixations at Psychosexual Stages

I. Oral stage (birth to 2 years)	Sarcasm, argumentativeness, greediness, acquisitiveness, overdependency
II. Anal stage (2–4 years)	Emotional outbursts such as rages and temper tantrums; compulsive orderliness and over controlled behavior
III. Phallic stage (4–6 years)	Problems with gender identification
IV. Genital stage (puberty to adulthood)	Narcissism or extreme self-love

=== Neo-Freudian Theory: Horney and Erikson ===
Karen Horney and Erik Erikson were both psychoanalysts that were greatly influenced by Sigmund Freud’s theories. Horney believes that as a child struggles with anxiety and the security issue, various behavioral strategies may be tried and eventually a character pattern will be adopted. She postulated three such character patterns: (1) moving toward people, characterized by compliance, submissive behavior, and a need for love; (2) moving against people, characterized by arrogance, hostility, and a need for power; and (3) moving away from people, characterized by social avoidance, withdrawal, and a need for independence. Erik Erikson viewed the ego not as an extension of the id, but as autonomous both in origin and function. The environmental and societal values are central to this new view of the ego, a view that resulted in “the addition of an entire social and cultural dimension to the concept of personality growth.” Erikson's benefaction to the knowledge of disordered behavior centers around his concepts of crisis and the importance of crisis resolution during critical periods of development. He proposed eight stages of psychosocial development shown in the table below.

Erikson's Psychosocial Stages

Developmental Phase	Psychosocial Stage	Related Adjustment Problems
I. Infancy	Trust vs. mistrust	Mistrust of others
II. Early childhood (ages 1–3)	Autonomy vs. shame and doubt	Doubt in oneself and mistrust in environment
III. Play age (ages 3–5)	Initiative vs. guilt	Overdeveloped conscience which prevents independent action; excessive guilt
IV. School age (ages 5–10)	Industry vs. inferiority	Doubt in one's ability to perform adequately for society; feelings of inferiority and inadequacy
V. Adolescence	Identity vs. identity diffusion	Doubt about one's sexual, ethnic, or occupational identity
