= Graphesthesia =

Precise cutaneous sensibility in the hand explored using a stylus

Graphesthesia is the ability to recognize writing on the skin purely by the sensation of touch. Its name derives from Greek graphē ("writing") and aisthēsis ("perception"). Graphesthesia tests combined cortical sensation; therefore, it is necessary that primary sensation be intact.

During medical or neurological examination graphesthesia is tested in order to test for certain neurological conditions such as; lesions in brainstem, spinal cord, sensory cortex or thalamus. An examiner writes single numbers or simple letters on the skin (usually the palm) with something that will provide a clear stimulus, such as a broken tongue depressor, pen cap etc. Prior to the start of testing, an agreement may be reached between the examiner and the patient as to the orientation of the letters, although this is often unnecessary, since orientation and size of the figures are rarely an issue. The crucial aspect of testing graphesthesia, as with any sensory testing, is to establish that the patient understands the test, hence the test is commenced, in the hemiplegic patient, on the normal, intact hand. This also allows the examiner to establish the patient's numeracy, since semi-numerate patients may have difficulties performing the task.

The patient provides a verbal response identifying the figure that was drawn. If the patient has a speech or language impairment that prevents them from verbalizing an answer, the answer can be selected from a series of images shown to them. Loss of graphesthesia indicates either parietal lobe damage on the side opposite the hand tested or damage to the dorsal columns pathway at any point between the tested point and the contralateral parietal lobe. The major clinical utility of the test in the 21st century is in the condition, cortico-basal ganglionic degeneration, where, in addition to evidence of basal ganglia dysfunction, the presence of cortical sensory loss is likely to have reasonably high specificity for the diagnosis.

Testing graphesthesia can be substituted for stereognosis if a patient is unable to grasp an object. Graphesthesia can be considered as a type of synthetic sensation as it involves a complex interaction between three neural components i.e. Tactile sensation, two point discrimination and cortical component that stores infirmation about the symbol/letter that is being traced in the skin and was learned through some previous experience.
