= Haim Belmaker =

Israeli professor of psychiatry

Prof. Robert Haim Belmaker
- חיים בלמקר
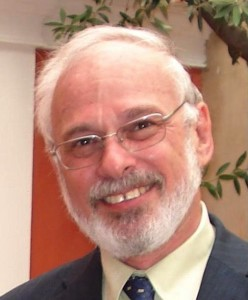
- Born: July 8, 1947; US
- Citizenship: United States, Israel
- Education: BA from Harvard College in 1967, MD from Duke Medical School in 1971, Clinical Fellow at US National Institute of Mental Health 1972–1974
- Awards: Anna Monika Prize for Research in Depression (1983), the Ziskind-Somerfeld Prize for Senior Research in Psychiatry (1993), the European College of Neuropsychopharmacology Lilly Research Award (1996), National Alliance for Research on Schizophrenia and Depression Lifetime Achievement Nola Maddox Falcone Prize for research in affective disorder (2000), Research prize of the World Federation of Societies of Biological Psychiatry (2004)
- Website: Prof. Robert Haim Belmaker Website

Prof. Robert Haim Belmaker (Hebrew: חיים בלמקר; born 8 July 1947), is an Israeli psychiatrist who has had major academic positions in Israeli psychiatry since 1974. He had a formative influence on biological directions in Israeli psychiatry. He was Hoffer-Vickar Professor of Psychiatry at Ben-Gurion University of the Negev, Beersheva Israel (holding the first named Chair of Psychiatry in Israel) until his retirement and is now Emeritus.

He was President of the International College of Neuropsychopharmacology 2008–2010, President of the Israel Psychiatry Association 2015–2018, and Organizing Chair of the World Psychiatric Association Congress on Psychiatry and Religion held in Jerusalem, Israel in December 2019 He has contributed editorials in the areas of treatment of bipolar disorder in 2007 and then in 2014 on antipsychotic treatment of bipolar disorder, on the potential of transcranial magnetic stimulation as a new frontier (1995) and on the future of randomised clinical trials (2015). An oral history of his research contributions is available at the American College of Neuropsychopharmacology video archives

== Education ==
Prof. Belmaker received his BA from Harvard College in 1967; his MD from Duke Medical School in 1971; and was a Clinical Fellow at US National Institute of Mental Health 1972–1974.

== Research focus/interests ==
Prof. Belmaker has researched the mechanism of action of lithium in bipolar disorder throughout his career and focussed interest on second messenger systems in the brain, Biological Psychiatry, 1993, New England Journal of Medicine, (2007). He was one of the first psychiatrists to study a continuum between the molecular genetics of temperament and that of bipolar disorder and edited a seminal volume. He was one of the first investigators to see the potential for transcranial magnetic stimulation of the brain as a treatment for depression, the first to study it in animal models of depression, and co-edited the first handbook of this treatment for psychiatric disorder that was widely influential for many years. In 2023 Springer Nature published his text (with Prof P. Lichtenberg) "Psychopharmacology Reconsidered: A Concise Text Exploring the Limits of Diagnosis and Treatment", the first textbook of psychopharmacology to emphasize the absence of any biological test for any psychiatric disorder, the lack of correlation between DSM-5 diagnoses and psychopharmacologic indication and mechanisms, high placebo response rates, and indications for withdrawing psychopharmacological treatment.

== Appointments ==
1. President of the International College of Neuropsychopharmacology (CINP) 2008–2010
2. Vice-president of the International Society for Bipolar Disorders (ISBD) 2012–2014
3. President of the Israel Psychiatric Association 2015–2018
4. President of the International Neuropsychiatry Association 2016–2018
5. Deputy Director of the Mental Health Center in Beersheba 1994–2012

== Published works ==
(Partial List)

=== Books ===
- Robert Haim Belmaker, Pesach Lichtenberg, Psychopharmacology Reconsidered - A Concise Guide Exploring the Limits of Diagnosis and Treatment, Springer, 2023

=== Articles ===
- Transcranial magnetic stimulation: a potential new frontier in psychiatry, Biological Psychiatry 38 (7), 1995
- Treatment of bipolar depression, New England Journal of Medicine, 356 (17), 2007
- Lurasidone and bipolar disorder, American Journal of Psychiatry, 171 (2), 2014
- Editorial: the future of randomised clinical trials, Israel Journal of Psychiatry and Related Sciences, 52 (1), 2015

=== Collaborative works ===
- Ebstein, R; Belmaker, R; Grunhaus, L; Rimon, R (1976). "Lithium inhibition of adrenaline-stimulated adenylate cyclase in humans". Nature. 259: 411–3. doi:10.1038/259411a0. PMID 175287..
- Baron, M; Risch, N; Hamburger, R; Mandel, B; Kushner, S; Newman, M; Drumer, D; Belmaker, RH (1987). "Genetic linkage between X-chromosome markers and bipolar affective illness". Nature. 326: 289–92. doi:10.1038/326289a0. PMID 3493438..
- Kofman, O; Belmaker, RH (1993). "Ziskind-Somerfeld Research Award 1993. Biochemical, behavioral, and clinical studies of the role of inositol in lithium treatment and depression". Biol Psychiatry. 34: 839–52. doi:10.1016/0006-3223(93)90052-f. PMID 8110911..
- Fleischmann, Prolog; Abarbanel, Belmaker (1995). "The effect of transcranial magnetic stimulation of rat brain on behavioural models of depression". Brain Research. 699 (1): 130–132.
- Ebstein, RP; Novick, O; Umansky, R; et al. (January 1996). "Dopamine D4 receptor (D4DR) exon III polymorphism associated with the human personality trait of Novelty Seeking". Nat. Genet. 12: 78–80. doi:10.1038/ng0196-78. PMID 8528256.
- George & Belmaker (eds.), Transcranial Magnetic Stimulation (TMS) in Neuropsychiatry. Washington DC: APA Press, 2000.
- Benjamin, Ebstein & Belmaker (eds.), Molecular Genetics and Human Personality, Washington DC: APA Press, 2002.

== Awards ==
He has received the Anna Monika Prize for Research in Depression (1983), the Ziskind-Somerfeld Prize for Senior Research in Psychiatry (1993) and the European College of Neuropsychopharmacology Lilly Research Award (1996), and the National Alliance for Research on Schizophrenia and Depression Lifetime Achievement Nola Maddox Falcone Prize for research in affective disorder (2000), and the research prize of the World Federation of Societies of Biological Psychiatry (2004). In 2018 he was awarded the Lifetime Achievement award of the Israel Psychiatric Association.

== Family ==
Prof. Belmaker is married (since 1967) to Ilana Belmaker, the former Director of Public Health in the Negev, a pediatrician and a preventive medicine specialist. They have six children and 13 grandchildren.
