= Kristen Roupenian =

American writer

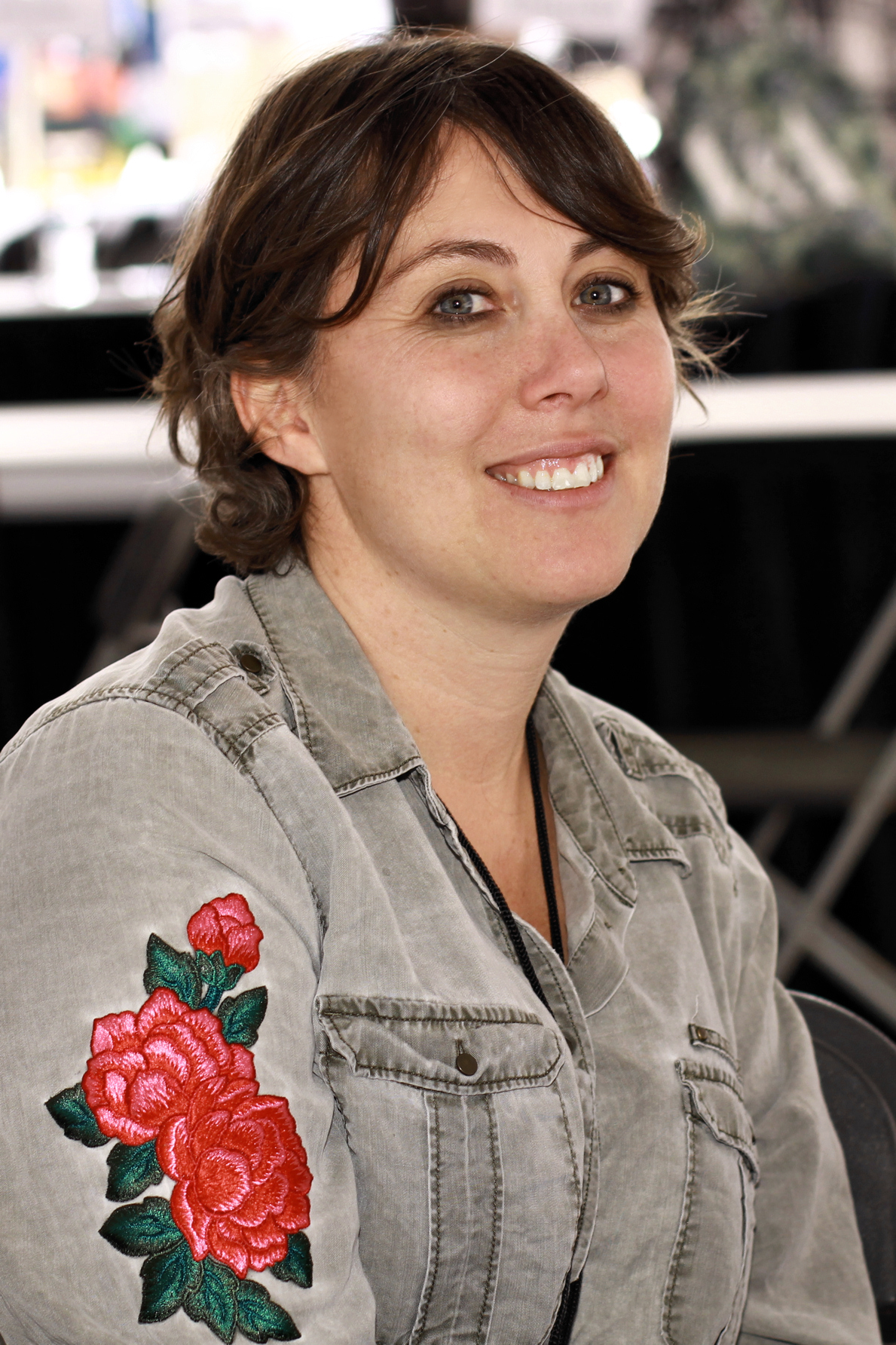
- Roupenian at the 2019 Texas Book Festival
- Born: c. 1982
- Education: Barnard College (AB); Harvard University (PhD); University of Michigan (MFA)
- Occupations: Writer, author

Kristen Roupenian (/ruːˈpɛniən/) is an American writer best known for her 2017 short story "Cat Person" and her 2019 short story collection You Know You Want This.

== Early life and education ==
Roupenian grew up in the Boston area. Her father is a medical doctor of Armenian origin, and her mother is a retired nurse. Roupenian graduated from Barnard College in 2003 with a dual degree in English and Psychology and holds a PhD in English Literature from Harvard University, as well as a Master of Fine Arts from the Helen Zell Writers' Program at the University of Michigan.

== Writing ==
In 2017 Roupenian's short story "Cat Person" was published in The New Yorker.

Following the viral success of "Cat Person", Roupenian's debut book was the subject of a bidding war in the American market, with offers exceeding $1m. The book was acquired by Scout Press. Roupenian received a $1.2 million advance for the book. In 2018 HBO bought the development rights for the collection to create an anthology drama series project. You Know You Want This, a collection of short stories including "Cat Person", was published in January 2019.

In July 2021 Alexis Nowicki alleged that, in writing "Cat Person," Roupenian included details from Nowicki's life and that of a man Nowicki and Roupenian had both known. In an email reply to Nowicki, Roupenian acknowledged that information she learned from Nowicki's social media served as a "jumping-off point" for "a story that was primarily a work of the imagination, but which also drew on my own personal experiences, both past and present." She apologized for not changing particulars, stating "I can absolutely see why the inclusion of those details in the story would cause you significant pain and confusion."

In March 2018, A24 acquired the rights to Roupenian's horror spec script Bodies, Bodies, Bodies. The screenplay was rewritten by Sarah DeLappe and Bodies Bodies Bodies was released in August 2022, with Roupenian receiving 'story by' credit.

== Publications ==
- You Know You Want This. Gallery, 2019. ISBN 9781982101633.
