= Neuropsychiatry =

Branch of medicine that treats mental disorders caused by diseases of the nervous system

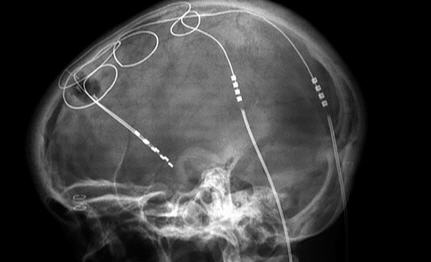
X-ray image of deep brain stimulation, a procedure used to treat disorders such as OCD and clinical depression.

Neuropsychiatry is a branch of medicine that deals with psychiatry as it relates to neurology, in an effort to understand and attribute behavior to the interaction of neurobiology and social psychological factors. Within neuropsychiatry, the mind is considered "as an emergent property of the brain", whereas other behavioral and neurological specialties might consider the two as separate entities. Those disciplines are typically practiced separately.

Neuropsychiatry has become a growing subspecialty of neurology as it closely relates the fields of neuropsychology and behavioral neurology, and attempts to utilize this understanding to better understand psychological trauma, autism, attention deficit hyperactivity disorder (ADHD), and Tourette syndrome, among others.

== The case for the rapprochement of neurology and psychiatry ==
Given the considerable overlap between behavioral neurology and neuropsychiatry, there has been a resurgence of interest and debate relating to neuropsychiatry in academia since the early 2000s. Most of this work argues for a rapprochement of neurology and psychiatry, forming a specialty above and beyond a subspecialty of psychiatry. For example, Professor Joseph B. Martin, former Dean of Harvard Medical School and a neurologist by training, has summarized the argument for reunion: "the separation of the two categories is arbitrary, often influenced by beliefs rather than proven scientific observations. And the fact that the brain and mind are one makes the separation artificial anyway." These points and some of the other major arguments are detailed below.

=== Mind/brain monism ===
Neurologists have focused objectively on organic nervous system pathology, especially of the brain, whereas psychiatrists have laid claim to illnesses of the mind. This antipodal distinction between brain and mind as two different entities has characterized many of the differences between the two specialties. However, it has been argued that this division is fictional; evidence from the last century of research has shown that our mental life has its roots in the brain. Brain and mind have been argued not to be discrete entities but just different ways of looking at the same system. It has been argued that embracing this mind/brain monism may be useful for several reasons. First, rejecting dualism implies that all mentation is biological, which provides a common research framework in which understanding and treatment of mental disorders can be advanced. Second, it mitigates widespread confusion about the legitimacy of mental illness by suggesting that all disorders should have a footprint in the brain.

In sum, a reason for the division between psychiatry and neurology was the distinction between mind or first-person experience and the brain. That this difference is taken to be artificial by proponents of mind/brain monism supports a merge between these specialties. These specialities are different but rely on each other.

=== Causal pluralism ===
One of the reasons for the divide is that neurology traditionally looks at the causes of disorders from an "inside-the-skin" perspective (neuropathology, genetics) whereas psychiatry looks at "outside-the-skin" causation (personal, interpersonal, cultural). This dichotomy is argued not to be instructive and authors have argued that it is better conceptualized as two ends of a causal continuum. The benefits of this position are: firstly, understanding of etiology will be enriched, in particular between brain and environment. One example is eating disorders, which have been found to have some neuropathology but also show increased incidence in rural Fijian school girls after exposure to television. Another example is schizophrenia, the risk for which may be considerably reduced in a healthy family environment.

It is also argued that this augmented understanding of etiology will lead to better remediation and rehabilitation strategies through an understanding of the different levels in the causal process where one can intervene. It may be that non-organic interventions, like cognitive behavioral therapy (CBT), better attenuate disorders alone or in conjunction with drugs. Linden's demonstration of how psychotherapy has neurobiological commonalities with pharmacotherapy is a pertinent example of this and is encouraging from a patient perspective as the potentiality for pernicious side effects is decreased while self-efficacy is increased.

In sum, the argument is that an understanding of the mental disorders must not only have a specific knowledge of brain constituents and genetics (inside-the-skin) but also the context (outside-the-skin) in which these parts operate. Only by joining neurology and psychiatry, it is argued, can this nexus be used to reduce human suffering. Combining these subjects would help improve patient care and reduce stigma.

=== Organic basis ===
To further sketch psychiatry's history shows a departure from structural neuropathology, relying more upon ideology. One example of this is Tourette syndrome, which Sándor Ferenczi, although never having seen a patient with Tourette syndrome, suggested was the symbolic expression of masturbation caused by sexual repression. However, starting with the efficacy of neuroleptic drugs in attenuating symptoms the syndrome has gained pathophysiological support and is hypothesized to have a genetic basis too, based on its high inheritability. This trend can be seen for many hitherto traditionally psychiatric disorders (see table) and is argued to support reuniting neurology and psychiatry because both are dealing with disorders of the same system.

Linking traditional psychiatric symptoms or disorders to brain structures and genetic abnormalities. (This table is in not exhaustive but provides some psychodynamic and neurological bases to psychiatric symptoms.)
Psychiatric symptoms	Psychodynamic explanation	Neural correlates
Depression	Overwhelming aggression turned inward, guilt	Limbic-cortical dysregulation, monoamine imbalance
Mania	Avoidance of pain of the reality principle	Prefrontal cortex and hippocampus, anterior cingulate, amygdala
Schizophrenia	Projection of inner fantasies outwards due to ego disintegration	NMDA receptor activation in the human prefrontal cortex
Visual hallucination	Projection, cold distant mother causing a weak ego	Retinogeniculocalcarine tract, ascending brainstem modulatory structures
Auditory hallucination	Projection, cold distant mother causing a weak ego	Frontotemporal functional connectivity
Obsessive-compulsive disorder	Shame regarding a pleasurable childhood experience	Frontal-subcortical circuitry, right caudate activity
Eating disorder	Attempted control of internal anxiety	Atypical serotonin system, right frontal and temporal lobe dysfunction, changes to mesolimbic dopamine pathways

=== Improved patient care ===
Further, it is argued that this nexus will allow a more refined nosology of mental illness to emerge thus helping to improve remediation and rehabilitation strategies beyond current ones that lump together ranges of symptoms. However, it cuts both ways: traditionally neurological disorders, like Parkinson's disease, are being recognized for their high incidence of traditionally psychiatric symptoms, like psychosis and depression. These symptoms, which are largely ignored in neurology, can be addressed by neuropsychiatry and lead to improved patient care. In sum, it is argued that patients from both traditional psychiatry and neurology departments will see their care improved following a reuniting of the specialties.

=== Better management model ===
Psychiatrist Randolph B. Schiffer, pediatrician Daniel L. Hurst, neuropsychiatrist Walter Lajara-Nanson, and psychiatrist Russell C. Packard argue that there are good management and financial reasons for rapprochement.

== US institutions ==
"Behavioral Neurology & Neuropsychiatry" fellowships are accredited by the United Council for Neurologic Subspecialties (UCNS; www.ucns.org), in a manner analogous to the accreditation of psychiatry and neurology residencies in the United States by the American Board of Psychiatry and Neurology (ABPN).

The American Neuropsychiatric Association (ANPA) was established in 1988 and is the American medical subspecialty society for neuropsychiatrists. ANPA holds an annual meeting and offers other forums for education and professional networking amongst subspecialists in behavioral neurology and neuropsychiatry as well as clinicians, scientists, and educators in related fields. American Psychiatric Publishing, Inc. publishes the peer-reviewed Journal of Neuropsychiatry and Clinical Neurosciences, which is the official journal of ANPA.

== International organizations ==
The International Neuropsychiatric Association was established in 1996. INA holds congresses biennially in countries around the world and partners with regional neuropsychiatric associations around the world to support regional neuropsychiatric conferences and to facilitate the development of neuropsychiatry in the countries/regions where those conferences are held. Prof. Robert Haim Belmaker is the current president of the organization whereas Prof. Ennapadam S Krishnamoorthy serves as President-Elect with Dr. Gilberto Brofman as Secretary-Treasurer.

The British NeuroPsychiatry Association (BNPA) was founded in 1987 and is the leading academic and professional body for medical practitioners and professionals allied to medicine in the UK working at the interface of the clinical and cognitive neurosciences and psychiatry.

In 2011, a non-profit professional society named Neuropsychiatric Forum (NPF) was founded. NPF aims to support effective communication and interdisciplinary collaboration, develop education schemes and research projects, organize neuropsychiatric conferences and seminars.

== Criticism ==
Historians Fernando Vidal and Francisco Ortega argue that neuropsychiatry strengthens the conception of mental suffering as a product of individual irresponsibility. In his book Capitalist Realism, academic Mark Fisher in turn states that when depression is made to be a consequence of individual biochemial imbalance, social causation is ruled out.

Historian Edward Shorter argues that the view that depression is a brain disorder to be corrected with medication is a product of the pharmaceutical advertising rather than a scientific understanding of depression.

The efficacy of neuropsychiatric treatment has been questioned. This is particularly in regard to psychiatric drugs, of which the success and mechanism of treatment are mixed and largely unknown respectively, and the use of current neuroimaging technology for diagnostic and treatment purposes, which according to neuropsychiatrist Helen S. Mayberg is "without medical or scientific support,” as results do not clarify causality.

== See also ==
- Cognitive neuropsychiatry
- Neurology
- Neurogenetics
- Neuropsychology
- Neurosemiotics
- Psychiatry
- Psychiatric genetics
- Psychoneuroimmunology
