= Mia Healey =

Australian actress

- Born: 28 August 1998 (age 28); Sydney, Australia
- Education: National Institute of Dramatic Art
- Occupations: Actress, model
- Years active: 2020–present
- Known for: The Wilds

Mia Taylor Healey (born 28 August 1998) is an Australian actress and model. She is known for her role as Shelby Goodkind in the Amazon Prime Video series The Wilds (2020–2022) and as Alicia Whitaker in the Prime Video coming-of-age drama Motorheads (2025).

== Early life and education ==
Healey was born in Sydney, New South Wales, Australia, to parents Nick and Suzie Healey. She has two siblings — an older brother, Oscar, and a younger sister, Romy. Her mother began enrolling her in acting classes at the age of four. She grew up in Burradoo, a rural town in New South Wales, where she attended Oxley College.

She later trained at the National Institute of Dramatic Art (NIDA) in Sydney, graduating in 2017 with a Diploma of Stage and Screen Performance. NIDA alumni include Cate Blanchett, Sarah Snook, and Mel Gibson.

== Career ==
Healey's first on-screen credit was her lead role as Shelby Goodkind in the Amazon Prime Video survival drama The Wilds, created by Sarah Streicher, which premiered on 11 December 2020. She booked the role shortly after graduating from NIDA, flying to Los Angeles to audition in person rather than submitting a self-tape — a gamble that paid off when she was cast as one of the original series regulars in 2018. She played a beauty pageant queen from Texas whose outward optimism and religious faith concealed a deeply conflicted inner life, including internalized homophobia and a growing relationship with fellow castaway Toni Shalifoe (Erana James). Variety described it as a "smart debut performance" in its review of the first season. The series received positive reviews from critics, with the first season holding a 92% approval rating on Rotten Tomatoes. When asked about a potential head-shaving scene for the role, Healey said she would be willing to do so if the story called for it. Ahead of the second season premiere, Healey told E! News that she personally wanted Shelby and Toni to be "endgame", while acknowledging that both characters still had much to resolve individually. When Prime Video cancelled the series in July 2022 after two seasons, Healey responded on her Instagram Post, writing that she was "forever changed and eternally grateful" for the experience.

In 2025, she starred as Alicia Whitaker in the Prime Video coming-of-age series Motorheads, set in a small Pennsylvania town centred on a street-racing community. The series also stars Ryan Phillippe, Michael Cimino, and Drake Rodger. In a 2025 interview with Decider, Healey described Alicia as a "kind, soft-spoken" character who acts as a support system for her friends.

Also in 2025, she appeared in the horror film Twisted (released 2026), directed by Darren Lynn Bousman and starring alongside Djimon Hounsou and Lauren LaVera.

In 2026, she was cast as Sydney Brinkley, a lead character in the independent film Unrest, the directorial debut of Daniel Bigel.

== Modelling ==
Alongside her acting career, Healey has worked as a model. Her clients have included Bulgari, Dior, Coach, and Australian fashion label Aje.

== Personal life ==
She has described Cate Blanchett as her acting "hero".

Healey is openly bisexual. She came out publicly during promotion for The Wilds, describing the role of Shelby as the first time she had spoken about her sexuality publicly. In a 2023 interview with L'Odet, she said it was something she had never previously discussed, noting it was "a part of my life that I just wasn't ashamed of and was proud of and just kind of lived with."

Healey has spoken extensively about the importance of queer representation on screen, particularly in relation to the Shelby and Toni storyline in The Wilds. In interviews with E! News and The Wrap, she described the relationship as an overdue example of a lesbian love story told from a teenage perspective, and called on Hollywood to greenlight more LGBTQ+ inclusive projects. In a 2022 interview with The Advocate, she spoke about the response from audiences, noting that the role gave her the opportunity to connect with people and make them feel seen in ways she had not previously experienced.

== Filmography ==
=== Film ===
Key
| † | Denotes works that have not yet been released |

| Year | Title | Role | Notes |
|---|---|---|---|
| 2021 | Shark | Darlin' | Short film |
| 2023 | My Heart Calls For You | Vivienne Dubois | Short film |
| 2026 | Twisted | Smith | Feature film |
| TBA | Black Spartans † | Marci | Feature film |
| TBA | The Stray † | The Woman | Short film |
| TBA | Unrest † | Sydney | Feature film |

=== Television ===
| Year | Title | Role | Notes |
|---|---|---|---|
| 2020–2022 | The Wilds | Shelby Goodkind | 18 episodes |
| 2025 | Motorheads | Alicia Whitaker | 10 episodes |

=== Music Videos ===
| Year | Title | Role | Artist(s) | Ref. |
|---|---|---|---|---|
| 2024 | guilt. hole. | Nurse | Joe P | |
