= Taylor Zaudtke =

American actress

- Occupation: actress
- Years active: 2016 - present

Taylor Zaudtke is an American actress. She starred in various horror films, including Sadistic Intentions (2018), The Leech (2022) and The Well (2023).

== Career ==
Zaudtke started as non-professional actress in the short The Egg and the Hatchet, directed by Chris Skotchdopole in 2016, and director Eric Pennykoff had noted her performance and that of Jeremy Gardner; in a 2019 interview, he stated: "That’s really where I fell in love with the idea of those two in this film [Sadistic Intentions] I had kicking around my head."

== Filmography ==
Film
Year	Title	Role	Notes	Ref
2016	The Egg and the Hatchet		Short film; film debut	
2018	Sadistic Intentions	Chloe	Lead role	
2019	Fingers		Supporting role	
2019	After Midnight		Supporting role	
2022	The Leech	Lexi	Lead role	
2023	The Well	Tracy	Main cast	
