= Cleopatra Entertainment =

Film division of Cleopatra Records

- Type: Film division of Cleopatra Records
- Industry: Motion picture
- Founded: Los Angeles, CA (2015)
- Headquarters: Los Angeles, California, USA
- Key people: Brian Perera,
- Parent: Cleopatra Records
- Website: cleopatra-entertainment.com

Cleopatra Entertainment is the film division of Los Angeles based label Cleopatra Records.

== Films ==
=== 2015 ===
Title	Directors	Cast	Theatrical release date	DVD release date
Alleluia! The Devil's Carnival	Darren Lynn Bousman	Paul Sorvino, Barry Bostwick, Tech N9ne, David Hasselhoff, Ted Neeley	11 August 2015	Spring 2016
Forever and a Day	Katja von Garnier	Klaus Meine, Rudolf Schenker, Matthias Jabs, Scorpions	16 October 2015	27 November 2016

=== 2016 ===
Title	Directors	Cast	Theatrical release Date	DVD release date
Don’t You Wish That We Were Dead	Wes Orshoski	The Damned, David Vanian, Captain Sensible, Rat Scabies, Brian James	19 March 2015	20 June 2016
Blood Trap	Alberto Sciamma	Costas Mandylor, Gianni Capaldi, Vinnie Jones	19 March 2015	23 September 2016
StalkHer	John Jarratt, Kaarin Fairfax	John Jarratt, Kaarin Fairfax	30 September 2016	25 October 2016
A Street Cat Named Bob	Roger Spottiswoode	Luke Treadaway, Ruta Gedmintas, Joanne Froggatt	18 November 2016	TBA

=== 2017 ===
Title	Directors	Cast	Theatrical release date	DVD release date
Devil's Domain	Jared Cohn	Michael Madsen	2017	
Halloween Pussy Trap Kill! Kill!	Jared Cohn	Sara Malakul Lane, Richard Grieco, Dave Mustaine	2017	
The Black Room	Rolfe Kanefsky	Lin Shaye, Natasha Henstridge	2017	
The 27 Club			2017	
England Is Mine	Mark Gill	Jack Lowden	2017	
Diamond Cartel	Salamat Mukhammed-Ali	Peter O'Toole, Bolo Yeung	2017	

=== 2018 ===
Title	Directors	Cast	Theatrical release date	DVD release date
Ladyworld	Amanda Kramer		2018	
Are We Not Cats	Xander Robin		February 23, 2018	

=== 2019 ===
Title	Director	Cast	Theatrical release date	DVD release date
Chain of Death	David Martin Porras	Madeline Zima, Adrienne Barbeau, Jamie Clayton	19 July 2019	
Devil's Revenge	Jared Cohn	Jeri Ryan, William Shatner, Jason Brooks, Ciara Hanna, Jackie Dallas, Annmarie Giaquinto	1 October 2019	22 October 2019
Pretenders	James Franco	Jack Kilmer, Jane Levy, Shameik Moore, Juno Temple, Brian Cox, Dennis Quaid, James Franco	4 October 2019	12 November 2019
Mrs Lowry & Son	Adrian Noble	Vanessa Redgrave, Timothy Spall, Stephen Lord	1 November 2019	21 January 2019
Bluebird	Brian A. Loschiavo	Connie Britton, Garth Brooks, Steve Earle, Charles Esten, Vince Gill, Faith Hill, Jason Isbell, Maren Morris, Kacey Musgraves, Taylor Swift, Pam Tillis, Trisha Yearwood	15 November 2019	21 January 2019
Melody Makers	Leslie Ann Coles	Steve ‘Abbo’ Abbot, Ian Anderson, Eric Burdon	17 December 2019	17 December 2019
Come on Feel the Noize: How Rock Became Metal	Jörg Sonntag	Jimmy Page, Ian Gillan, Ozzy Osbourne, Nikki Sixx, James Hetfield, Dee Snider, Michael Monroe	3 December 2019	

=== 2020 ===
Title	Director	Cast	Theatrical release date	DVD release date
Get Gone	Michael Thomas Daniel	Lin Shaye, Weston Cage Coppola, Bradley Stryker	24 January 2020	
Street Survivors: The True Story of the Lynyrd Skynyrd Plane Crash	Jared Cohn	Ian Shultis, Taylor Clift, Samuel Kay Forrest, Rich Dally III	18 February 2020	30 June 2020
Game of Death	Sebastien Landry, Laurence Morais-Lagace	Sam Earle, Victoria Diamond, Emelia Hellman	14 July 2020	
Skin Walker	Christian Neuman	Udo Kier, Amber Anderson, Jefferson Hall	4 August 2020	
