= Sadistic Intentions =

- Directed by: Eric Pennycoff
- Written by: Eric Pennycoff
- Produced by: Jason Walter Short
- Starring: Jeremy Gardner; Michael Patrick Nicholson; Taylor Zaudtke
- Production companies: Midnight Treehouse; Alexander Groupe; Floral Black
- Release date: 20 October 2018 (Knoxville Horror Film Fest)
- Running time: 83 minutes
- Country: United States
- Language: English

Sadistic Intentions, originally known as Sadistic Intent, is a 2018 American horror romance film directed by Eric Pennycoff and starring Jeremy Gardner, Michael Patrick Nicholson and Taylor Zaudtke.

== Cast ==
- Taylor Zaudtke as Chloe
- Jeremy Gardner as Stu
- Michael Patrick Nicholson as Kevin
- Larry Fessenden as Father
- Jessica Freestone as Mother
- Stephanie Short as Daughter
- Jason Walter Short as Son

== Release ==
The film premiered at the Knoxville Horror Film Fest on 20 October 2018.

== Reception ==
Phil Wheat of Nerdly rated the film 4.5 stars out of 5. Both Matt Hudson of HorrorNews.net and film critic Kim Newman wrote positive reviews of the film.

Meagan Navarro of Bloody Disgusting was more critical of the film, rating it 2.5 out of 5.
