= After Midnight (2019 film) =

- Theatrical release poster
- Directed by: Jeremy Gardner; Christian Stella
- Written by: Jeremy Gardner
- Produced by: Justin Benson; Arvind Harinath; David Lawson Jr.; Aaron Moorhead
- Starring: Jeremy Gardner; Brea Grant; Henry Zebrowski; Justin Benson; Ashley Song; Nicola Masciotra; Keith Arbuthnot
- Production companies: Rustic Films; Kavya Films
- Distributed by: Cranked Up Films
- Release dates: April 26, 2019 (Tribeca); February 14, 2020 (United States)
- Running time: 83 minutes
- Country: United States
- Language: English

After Midnight (formerly titled Something Else) is a 2019 American romantic monster film directed by Jeremy Gardner and Christian Stella and starring Jeremy Gardner and Brea Grant. The film follows Hank after his longtime girlfriend Abby leaves town unannounced, as he discovers that a mysterious creature has begun stalking him every night.

After Midnight premiered at the Tribeca Film Festival on April 26, 2019, under its former title Something Else. It was released in limited theaters and VOD platforms in the United States through Cranked Up Films on Feb 14, 2020.

== Plot ==
After a ten-year relationship, Hank's girlfriend leaves him. He spends his days in melancholy, but a terrible creature begins to come to his house at nights and scratches his door with obviously unkind intentions. Hank tries to confront the monster, simultaneously recalling a collapsed relationship and trying to understand what went wrong with it.

== Cast ==
- Jeremy Gardner as Hank
- Brea Grant as Abby
- Henry Zebrowski as Wade
- Justin Benson as Shane
- Ashley Song as Jess
- Nicola Masciotra as Pam
- Taylor Zaudtke as Jane
- Keith Arbuthnot as the Creature

== Critical reception ==
After Midnight received positive reviews from critics. Review aggregator Rotten Tomatoes reports a rating of 89% based on 38 reviews, with an average rating of 7.8/10. The website's critics consensus reads: "Part creature feature, part romance, After Midnight somehow manages to combine its disparate ingredients and come up with something special."

Kristy Strouse at Film Inquiry praised the film, writing, "There’s an honesty in [After Midnight] that makes this man against (his) monsters story one that’ll give you deep meaning, beautiful cinematography, and just the right amount of WTF." Jennie Kermode at Eye for Film gave the film 4.5 out of 5 stars, describing it as a "winsome tale of thirtysomething angst, romance and existential terror [...] beautifully written and played."
