= The Well (2023 film) =

2023 horror film

- Directed by: Federico Zampaglione
- Written by: Stefano Masi; Federico Zampaglione
- Starring: Lauren LaVera; Claudia Gerini
- Cinematography: Andrea Arnone
- Edited by: Francesco Galli
- Music by: Oran Loyfer; Luca Chiaravalli; Federico Zampaglione; Francesco Zampaglione
- Production company: Iperuranio Films
- Distributed by: Iperuranio Films; CG Entertainment
- Release dates: October 2023 (Sitges); 1 August 2024 (Italy)
- Country: Italy
- Language: English

The Well is a 2023 English-language Italian gothic horror film co-written and directed by Federico Zampaglione, starring Lauren LaVera and Claudia Gerini.

== Plot ==
In 1993, Lisa Gray is sent to a small Italian village by her father, a renowned art restorer, to restore a damaged painting in the collection of Emma, a wealthy aristocrat. On her way to Emma's home, Lisa meets American biologists Madison and Tracy, and their guide Toni. The group parts ways in the town of Sambuci, and Lisa befriends a local publican, Marcus, before starting her work. Later that night, Madison, Tracy, and Toni are attacked and abducted from their campsite by an unseen person.

Lisa's job is to restore a 16th century painting that has been damaged in a fire, the canvas completely obscured by soot. She explains that a job of that size would normally take at least a month, but Emma insists that it must be completed within two weeks, as per the contract agreed with Lisa's father. Lisa begins work on the painting, revealing demonic figures and a ghostly, hairless entity that later appears in Lisa's dreams. The more of the painting that is revealed, the more sinister Lisa's dreams become. Emma's teenage daughter, Giulia, gives Lisa cryptic warnings about the painting, revealing that, once the entire artwork is revealed, the events depicted within will be reflected in the world.

Madison, Tracy and Toni awake to find themselves locked in cages that surround a well. Another man, Rocco, has also been imprisoned. A silent, hulking jailer places a bucket in the well, which is filled with blood when he pulls it back up. The jailer brutally murders first Toni, and later Madison, throwing them both down the well where they are devoured by a deformed creature that lives at the bottom.

Lisa's dreams become more and more vivid, including visions of her father slicing his own throat, and of Madison, Tracy and Toni, who all beg her for help. She is comforted by Marcus, who reassures her that the town is safe and that nothing ever happens there. He encourages her to finish the job so that they can spend more time together. Emma tells Lisa that she is displeased with her progress, and that she will regret it if she leaves before the painting is finished. In the dungeon, Rocco is killed by the creature as he tries to escape, leaving Tracy as the sole prisoner.

Now two weeks into the job, Lisa has until midnight to finish the work. She continues to reveal haunting and gruesome images in the painting. Giulia warns her that if Lisa finishes the painting she will 'end up like the others.' She explains that the painting depicts an incident that happened in 1493, in which a young boy was sacrificed in order to lure and capture a demon named Guron, so as to keep him captive for his youth-giving blood. It is revealed that it was Emma who carried out this sacrifice with the help of the witch Dorka - the ghostly, hairless entity - and The Man with the Dog. For 500 years they have kept Guron in the well and used his blood to keep their youth. In return, they feed him human flesh. If the full Blood Moon hits the finished painting before midnight, the curse will renew for another 500 years, prolonging the cycle of misery. To prove she is telling the truth, Giulia shows Lisa the way down to the dungeon to see the prisoners.

Lisa follows the jailer into the dungeon where she knocks him unconscious just before he is about to throw Tracy down the well. Guron escapes the well through the Rocco's tunnel and kills the jailer. Lisa and Tracy make it to the outside where they are met by Marcus, who shoots Tracy dead with a crossbow, revealing himself to be in on the plot. Marcus forces Lisa back into the castle.

With ten minutes to spare before midnight, Lisa is forced to finish the painting by Emma, Dorka, The Man with the Dog, and Marcus, who is also revealed to be in the painting. Giulia throws lighter fluid on the painting and threatens to burn it, castigating her mother for trapping her in a little girl's body for centuries. In a brief scuffle, Lisa is shot in the abdomen with the crossbow. Emma and Marcus are about to kill her when midnight strikes, and Emma, Marcus, Dorka, and The Man with the Dog all age rapidly and die as the curse lifts. Giulia, who accepts her fate, dies serenely. While trying to escape, Lisa is confronted by Guron. As the demon advances on her, she reads a Latin inscription from the painting, which causes Guron to wither to the ground.

In 2023, it is revealed that Lisa has inherited the castle and the grounds, and is now wealthy and powerful. The dungeon with the well has been turned into a medical laboratory, in which Guron is strapped to a gurney, kept alive in order to harvest his blood to sell for eternal youth.

== Cast ==
- Lauren LaVera as Lisa Gray
- Claudia Gerini as Emma Malvisi
- Jonathan Dylan King as Marcus
- Yassine Fadel as Rocco
- Gianluigi Galvani as Toni
- Taylor Zaudtke as Tracy
- Courage Oviawe as Madison
- Giovanni Lombardo Radice as Mr. Gray, Lisa's father
- Linda Zampaglione as Giulia
- Lorenzo Renzi as Arruda, the jailer
- Melanie Gaydos as Dorka
- Stefano Martinelli as Guron
- Toni Pandolfo as The Man with the Dog

== Production ==
The film was produced by Iperuranio Film in collaboration with CG Entertainment and was shot between March and April 2023 in Sambuci and Rome. Actor Giovanni Lombardo Radice died on April 27, 2023, shortly after filming ended. The Well was his final film role.

== Release ==
The film premiered at the 2023 Sitges Film Festival. It was released in Italian cinemas on 1 August 2024.

== Reception ==
On the review aggregator website Rotten Tomatoes, 86% of 7 critics' reviews are positive, with an average rating of 6.8/10.
