= Terrifier 2 =

2022 film by Damien Leone

- Theatrical release poster
- Directed by: Damien Leone
- Written by: Damien Leone
- Produced by: Phil Falcone; Michael Leavy; George Steuber; Jason Leavy; Steven Della Salla; Damien Leone
- Starring: Lauren LaVera; Elliott Fullam; Sarah Voigt; Kailey Hyman; Casey Hartnett; David Howard Thornton
- Cinematography: George Steuber
- Edited by: Damien Leone
- Music by: Paul Wiley
- Production companies: Dark Age Cinema; Fuzz on the Lens Productions
- Distributed by: Cinedigm (Note: Cinedigm released with their Bloody Disgusting and Screambox labels.); Iconic Events Releasing
- Release dates: August 29, 2022 (FrightFest); October 6, 2022 (United States)
- Running time: 138 minutes
- Country: United States
- Language: English
- Budget: $250,000
- Box office: $15.8 million

Terrifier 2 is a 2022 American independent supernatural slasher film written, edited, co-produced, and directed by Damien Leone. It is the sequel to Terrifier (2016) and the second installment in the Terrifier film series. It includes the return of David Howard Thornton and Samantha Scaffidi, who portrayed Art the Clown and Victoria Heyes, respectively, in the first film, and features Lauren LaVera, Elliott Fullam, Sarah Voigt, Kailey Hyman, and Casey Hartnett in new roles. The plot follows Art's resurrection and pursuit on Halloween night of teenage Sienna Shaw (LaVera), who discovers that she is destined to defeat him.

The film originated from a feature film concept Leone began developing shortly after filming his directorial debut short film The 9th Circle (2008). The concept of the planned film focused on an angel-dressed heroine and ultimately fell apart. Following its predecessor's release, Leone wanted to bring the heroine back; she would evolve into Sienna, described by Leone as the "heart and soul" of Terrifier 2. Leone spent three months writing a character-driven screenplay following criticism of the first film's perceived lack of narrative.

Funding was exacting as the script was more ambitious than the first film and required a bigger budget. Leone secured finances from private investors and Scotty Gelt Productions prior to filming, and he launched an Indiegogo campaign with a $50,000 goal to produce a practical effects-driven scene. The campaign was a massive success, reaching over 430% of the initial goal with a donation total of $250,000. It is one of the numerous films impacted by the worldwide COVID-19 pandemic, with principal photography coming to a halt mid-2020 due to the pandemic lockdowns.

Terrifier 2 had its premiere at the FrightFest on August 29, 2022, and was theatrically released in the United States on October 6, by Cinedigm. The film received generally positive reviews from critics, with particular praise for LaVera and Thornton's performances, though the film's runtime received some criticism. Many critics considered the film to be an improvement over its predecessor. A sequel, Terrifier 3, was released in October 2024.

== Plot ==
In a morgue, Art the Clown resurrects and brutally murders the coroner examining his body (Note: As depicted in Terrifier (2016).), taking his eye to replace his missing one, before going to the laundromat to clean his blood-soaked suit where he encounters the Little Pale Girl—a mysterious entity in similar clown attire.

One year later, teenager Sienna Shaw is preparing her Halloween costume: a Valkyrie character designed by her recently deceased father. Her younger brother Jonathan has become fixated with Art since discovering drawings of him in their father's sketchbook. That night, Sienna has a nightmare about a commercial for "The Clown Cafe" in which Art appears. He kills various Clown Cafe patrons as Sienna pulls a sword from a box of cereal. She wakes from the dream and finds her dresser on fire, but the sword resting on it is unscathed.

Later that day, Jonathan sees Art and the Little Pale Girl at school playing with a dead opossum and is blamed when his principal discovers the carcass. Sienna goes to a costume shop where Art antagonizes her. Art kills the shop clerk when she leaves and arrives at Allie's home pretending to trick-or-treat. He later breaks into her house and brutally maims her before killing her mother.

Jonathan shows Sienna their father's sketchbook, filled with sketches of Art and newspaper clippings of 10 year old Emily Crane who was murdered. He believes their father knew how to stop Art, saying that he gifted her the sword for that purpose but their mother Barbara scolds Johnathan for his fixation on Art. Sienna departs for a Halloween party while Jonathan runs away after Barbara slaps him. Barbara is then shot and killed by Art and when Jonathan returns home, Art kidnaps him and steals Sienna's sword.

At the party, Brooke spikes Sienna's drink and has a panic attack after seeing the Little Pale Girl in the crowd. Brooke's boyfriend Jeff drives them home when Sienna gets a phone call from The Little Pale Girl mimicking Jonathan's voice, leading them to an abandoned carnival. While Sienna looks for Jonathan alone, Art castrates and murders Jeff and chases Brooke into a haunted house named Terrifier where he murders her and beats Sienna unconscious.

Sienna awakens to find Art attacking Jonathan. Sienna and Art fight and when Jonathan shoots Art, Sienna passes out and Art kidnaps Jonathan. He stabs Sienna with her father's sword and throws her into a portal to Hell where she encounters the "Clown Cafe" again. Sienna dies but is resurrected by the sword. She decapitates Art while he is biting into Jonathan's calves. The Little Pale Girl takes his head and leaves as Sienna and Jonathan embrace.

In a Mental institution, Victoria writes "Vicky + Art" and obscenities on the wall with her own blood. She gives birth to Art's living head as her eyes glow bright.

== Cast ==
- Lauren LaVera as Sienna Shaw, Jonathan's older sister
- David Howard Thornton as Art the Clown
- Elliott Fullam as Jonathan, Sienna's younger brother
- Sarah Voigt as Barbara, mother of Sienna and Jonathan
- Kailey Hyman as Brooke, Sienna's friend
- Casey Hartnett as Allie, Sienna's friend
- Charlie McElveen as Jeff, Brooke's boyfriend
- Amelie McLain as the Little Pale Girl (Note: McLain also appears as Emily Crane in a photographic cameo.)
- Johnath Davis as Ricky, the costume shop clerk
- Nedim Jahić as Travis Bryant
- Samantha Scaffidi as Victoria Heyes, the sole survivor of the events of the first film, who is now in a psychiatric hospital
- Leah Voysey as Clown Cafe TV host / Nurse
- Chris Jericho as Adam Burke, a security guard
- Felissa Rose as Ms. Principe
- Owen Myre as Sean
- Griffin Santopietro as Eric
- Tamara Glynn as costume shop mom

Additionally, Jenna Kanell and Catherine Corcoran are credited for photographic cameos as Tara and Dawn, respectively.

== Production ==
=== Writing ===
"...That was my favorite character that I ever wrote, ever. So I knew that character was always there; I knew one day I was going to bring that character back and finally make a movie with her. So she is the heart and soul of Part 2, and everything revolves around that character. So I always knew that seed was there."

— Damien Leone on the evolution of Sienna Shaw

On February 12, 2019, Leone revealed in a post on his social media, showing the cover page, that the first draft of the screenplay was complete. Leone envisioned the concept of the film dating back to 2008—with an idea of an angel-warrior costumed heroine battling the Art the Clown character. This heroine was the basis of Sienna, who Leone wanted to bring back for Terrifier 2, which he knew he wanted to make while filming the first film. The writing process for the film differed from Leone's previous film projects, in which he had to work around part-time jobs. Leone spent three consecutive months writing. Much of his focus was on developing a character that could rival Art in popularity. When he was not writing, he would read books about screenwriting and listen to screenwriters discuss their processes with writing.

He opted to bring back the angel-attired heroine a decade later and adapt her into Sienna Shaw. Leone described much of the screenplay revolving around the teenage girl, his favorite character he has ever written. Leone describes the screenplay as much bigger in scope than the previous film and recollects not considering a budget while writing.

One of the factors during writing was establishing an adversary to Art—something inspired by the relationship between superhero Batman and supervillain Joker. During a lunch with Leone and David Howard Thornton, the actress who plays Sienna, Lauren LaVera, was told of this intended dynamic between her character and Art. Besides Sienna, LaVera recollects the script focusing heavily on Sienna's younger brother Jonathan, their mother, and her friends—all of whom play a crucial part in the story.

=== Casting ===
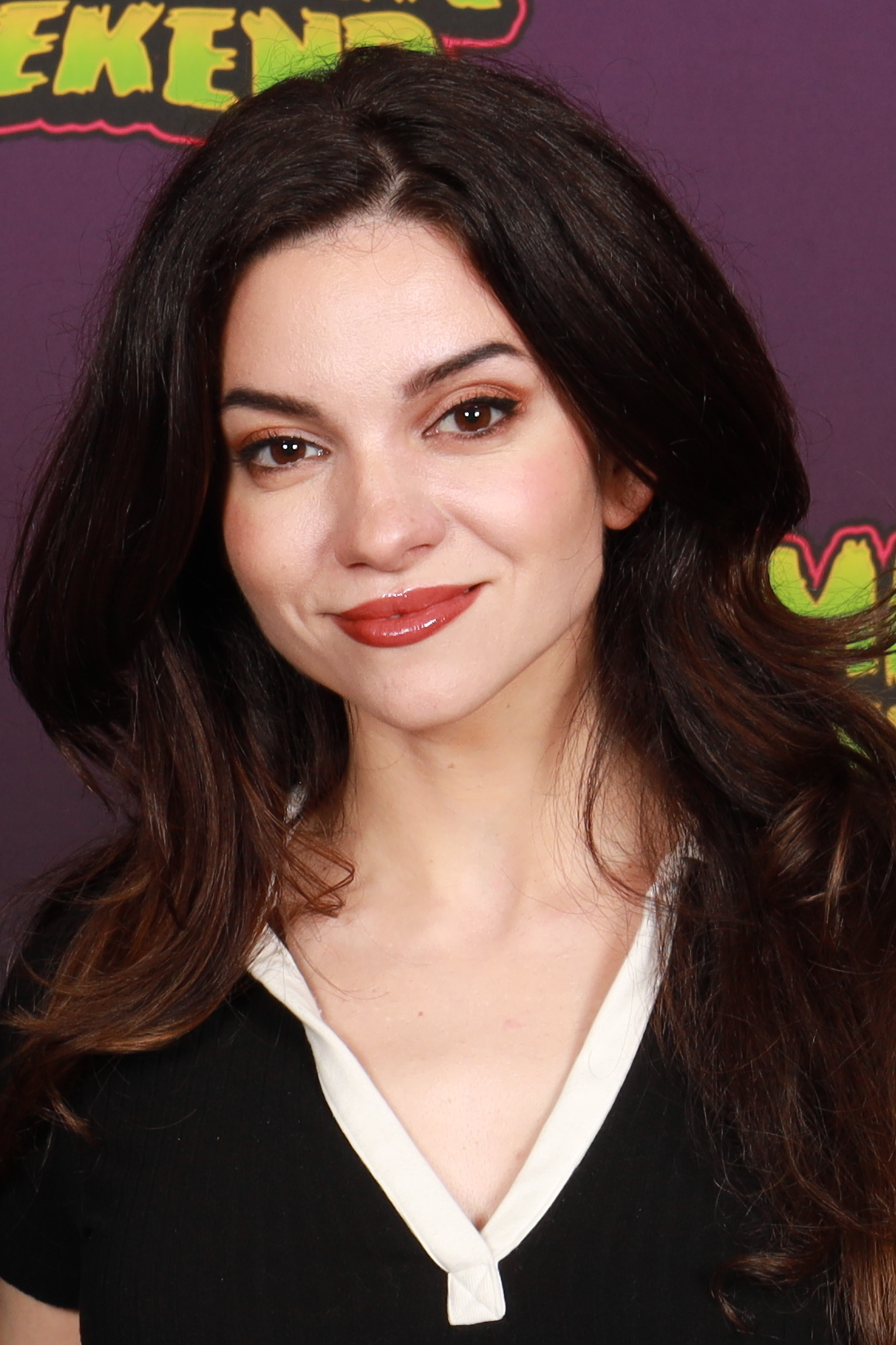
Lauren LaVera (pictured) portrays Sienna Shaw.

Both Thornton and Scaffidi were confirmed to reprise their respective roles of Art the Clown and Victoria Heyes, becoming the only returning cast members of the prior film, other than a brief voice cameo by Michael Leavy (who played Will the Exterminator in the original film) as the Club Announcer and DJ voice, and Corey Duval, who returns as the coroner from the first installment. There were also reports of Steven Della Salla and Jason Leavy, the two cops in the original film, returning in cameo appearances as well; the three were all producers for the second installment. On September 11, 2019, it was announced that actress Lauren LaVera was cast in the lead role of Sienna Shaw. On October 15, it was announced that Felissa Rose, Chris Jericho and Tamara Glynn had joined the cast in cameo roles. Actress Leah Voysey had auditioned for Sienna and her friends Ally and Brooke before co-producer Jason Leavy, who knew about Voysey's singing and guitar skills, invited her to be the host that performed a song in the Clown Cafe dream sequence, which after being filmed led to Leone bringing Voysey to appear as a nurse in the credits scene.

=== Filming ===
While Leone had secured full funding for the film from a handful of private investors prior to filming, he launched an Indiegogo with a $50k goal to finance a practical effects driven scene and to attach a well known actor to the project. The campaign was a major success, grossing over $125k in the first week. It reached a total of $250k by the end of the campaign, 430% more than the initial goal.

Filming began in October 2019. While a majority of the film's main storyline had already been completed, principal photography was halted due to COVID-19, becoming one of many films affected by the worldwide COVID-19 pandemic. On September 7, Leone revealed that he was in the process of working on the prosthetic makeup for Victoria's disfigured face in preparation of filming Samantha Scaffidi's scenes. As Sienna's costume received a positive reception when production stills were officially released, when asked about the attire, LaVera described liking it on the first day of wearing it but began to feel disdain for it throughout the course of filming as it was uncomfortable to wear. She even suffered blisters from wearing it. Filming quietly resumed and wrapped on July 10, 2021. The post-credits scene would originally reveal Art growing out of the back of Victoria's head, but once Malignant had a similar getup for its villain, Leone discarded it and shot another sequence where Victoria gave birth to Art's head.

=== Marketing ===
A teaser trailer for Terrifier 2 was released on July 24, 2020. MovieWeb's Jeremy Dick commented on the teaser, stating that "the teaser is pretty exciting to watch for anyone who enjoyed the first movie."

It was also announced that a three-issue limited release comic book series would be issued prior to the film's release.

=== Special effects ===
The film gained significant media coverage for its gore effects, particularly in the notorious "Bedroom Scene", depicting the lengthy murder of the supporting character Allie (Casey Hartnett). Leone stated that it was the most challenging and technical scene to film out of the entire production—three minutes depicting mutilation. Leone had to create a life-size replica puppet of Hartnett that could work as an animatronic. He stated, "I had people under the bed with rods going through it into her limbs and behind the wall operating her head. I put some rubber gloves in her chest with tubing to have her breathe." Leone digitally added Hartnett's eye onto the puppet when Allie awakens to her mother.

== Release ==
Terrifier 2 had its world premiere at the Fantastic Fest on August 29, 2022, and screened the same day at Fright Fest in London. It was theatrically released on October 6, 2022. The film was later available to stream on Screambox, as well as play at various "prominent genre festivals" prior to its official release. Leone had previously expressed a desire to release the picture "road show style" once finished.

While initially set for a one-week limited theatrical release, audience demand led Bloody Disgusting to announce that Terrifier 2 would remain in theaters for a second weekend on October 12, 2022. On October 17, this run was extended once more for another week.

=== Home media ===
The film was released for VOD on November 11, 2022, followed by a Blu-ray and DVD release on December 27, 2022. It grossed $4.9 million in home sales. In June 2024, a VHS version of the film was released by Witter Entertainment through Walmart.

== Reception ==
=== Box office ===
Terrifier 2 was released in 886 theaters in the United States, grossing $400,000 on its opening day. It went on to debut to $805,000, and then made $1 million the following weekend (an increase of 28%). Variety called the film's success a "shock" to the industry due to its low budget, limited mainstream marketing, and lack of marquee stars. Through its first two weeks of release, the film had grossed $3.4 million. Expanding to 1,550 theaters in its fourth weekend (an increase of 795) the film made $1.8 million, for a running total of $10.1 million as of November 2022. Terrifier & Terrifier 2 - Double Bill was released in the United Kingdom on September 27, 2024, and grossed $122,174.

Speaking of the film's box office success, Leone said, "I did not expect it to make this kind of splash or play in theaters, honestly, other than maybe a few arthouse theaters. To see it snowballing, the word of mouth growing, people getting sick and fainting and it really taking off, I never expected this or for it to make millions of dollars in theaters."

=== Critical response ===
On the review aggregator website Rotten Tomatoes, 87% of 83 critics' reviews are positive, with an average rating of 6.8/10. The website's consensus reads: "Terrifier 2 outdoes the original in every way – which makes it bad news for the squeamish, but a bloody good time for genre enthusiasts." Metacritic, which uses a weighted average, assigned the film a score of 59 out of 100, based on eight critics, indicating "mixed or average" reviews.

Jeffrey Anderson of Common Sense Media described the characters as memorable, particularly Sienna, due to her character development. Anderson states that "human life starts to matter more here than it did in the first film." Matt Donato of IGN while stating the film has "underdeveloped subplots and themes" noted it as an improvement of the original film and highlighted the performance of LaVera, writing that she "rules as Sienna in her angel-winged fantasy armor as a final girl fighting for family, facing her demons, and screaming bloody war cries in Art's mocking face." Matthew Jackson of Paste wrote that "LaVera, tasked with injecting humanity into the sequel, lives up to this task with pure star power." Trace Sauveur of The Austin Chronicle praised the "sense of physicality and comic timing" of Thornton. Sammy Gecsoyler from The Guardian rated the film a total of three stars out of five, praising the film's creative kills, and performances, while giving some criticism towards its runtime.

The film was not without its detractors. Owen Gleiberman of Variety commended the film for effectively capturing the look and feel of 1970's and 1980's slasher films, as well as the soundtrack and special effects, but was critical of the relentless brutality and unsympathetic characters. Adam Graham of The Detroit News rated the film a grade D, calling it "[a] bludgeoning exercise in splatter, which drags on well past the two hour mark with no sense of purpose other than its own inert attempts to shock."

=== Audience response ===
Following its release, there were several reports of viewers vomiting and fainting during their screenings of Terrifier 2, with one instance allegedly having emergency services being called. Speaking on the audience reactions to the film, director Damien Leone remarked, "Listen, I would have loved to have a couple of walk-outs, I think that's sort of a badge of honor because it is an intense movie. I don't want people fainting, getting hurt during the movie. But it's surreal."

== Accolades ==
Accolades received by Scream VI
Award	Date of ceremony	Category	Nominee(s)	Result	Ref.
Fangoria Chainsaw Awards	May 21, 2023	Best Kill	Killing Allie	Won	
Fangoria Chainsaw Awards	May 21, 2023	Best Limited Release Movie	Terrifier 2	Won	
Fangoria Chainsaw Awards	May 21, 2023	Best Makeup FX	Damien Leone	Won	
Fangoria Chainsaw Awards	May 21, 2023	The Editor's Eyeball Award	Lauren LaVera	Won	

== Novelization ==
A novelization of Terrifier 2 by Tim Waggoner was released by Titans Books on October 29, 2024. It would go on to win the 2025 Scribe Award for Best Adapted Novel.

== Sequel ==
In 2019, both Leone and Thornton stated that a Terrifier 3 was planned, along with further installments that would slowly build on Art's background and motives. In October 2022, Leone said he had an entire treatment for a third film but it was "getting so big that it could potentially split into a Part 4 because [he] wouldn't want to make another 2 hour 20 minute movie." The Coven Films, a French distribution company and executive producer of the series, announced in May 2023 that filming for the third would begin in either November or December of that year with an expected release in late 2024, a "low-mid seven figure budget." Leone, producer Phil Falcone, and actors David Howard Thornton and Lauren LaVera were all slated to reprise their roles.

Principal photography commenced by July 2023. The film is set during Christmas. In October of the same year, it was announced that the first trailer for the sequel would debut on November 1, 2023, exclusively during a theatrical re-release of Terrifier 2.
