= Shannon Berry =

Australian actress

- Born: 27 July 1999 (age 27); Port Hedland, Western Australia
- Education: Mount Lawley Senior High School
- Occupation: Actress
- Years active: 2016–present
- Known for: The Wilds

Shannon Berry (Port Hedland, Western Australia, 27 July 1999) is an Australian television actress. She played Dot Campbell on two seasons of Prime Video series The Wilds.

== Early life ==
Berry was brought up in Perth, Western Australia. She was born in Port Hedland, and spent her early childhood in the Pilbara before moving to Dianella at eight years-old. She first started acting while in primary school at John Septimus Roe Anglican Community School and attended Mount Lawley Senior High School until 2016. Shortly afterwards she moved from Perth to pursue acting jobs in Melbourne.

== Career ==
Berry appeared in Australian comedy-drama Offspring, for Network Ten, aged sixteen years-old. She also appeared in Geoffrey Wright’s reboot of Romper Stomper into a television series for Stan. Berry featured as Emme in Gale Anne Hurd led Syfy series Hunters. In 2018, Berry appeared in her first feature film, opposite Jacqueline McKenzie, called The Gateway.

Berry played tough Texan teenager Dot Campbell in Amazon Video desert island survivalist drama series The Wilds, which ran for two seasons between 2020 and 2022. She was cast alongside Emilia Jones in the Susanna Fogel directed film Winner. Berry has a small role which was written specifically for her in Michael Nikou’s Melbourne-filmed independent movie Slant.

In 2024, she appeared in the Australian mystery thriller television series High Country.

Berry starred in the 2025 Netflix miniseries adaptation of Jane Harper's novel, The Survivors.

== Filmography ==
Key
†	Denotes works that have not yet been released

=== Film ===
Year	Title	Role	Notes	Ref
2018	The Gateway	Samantha	Feature film	
2022	Slant	Samantha		
2024	Winner	Kaylee Thompson	Feature film	
2024	Skin to Skin	Maebel	Short	
2026	Leviticus	Jessica		

=== Television ===
Year	Title	Role	Notes
2016	Hunters	Emme	10 episodes
2017	Offspring	Brody Jordan	22 episodes
2018	Romper Stomper	Moo	2 episodes
2018	Monday Night Menace	Abbey	4 episodes
2020-2022	The Wilds	Dot	18 episodes
2024	High Country	Sophie	4 episodes
2024	Fake	Montana	2 episodes
2025	Watson	Autumn Franco	Episode: "Pilot"
2025	The Survivors	Bronte	TV series
