= Twisted (2026 film) =

2026 film by Darren Lynn Bousman

- Release poster
- Directed by: Darren Lynn Bousman
- Written by: Jonathan Bernstein; James Greer
- Produced by: Mark Burg; Lee Nelson; David Tish
- Starring: Djimon Hounsou; Lauren LaVera; Mia Healey; Gina Philips; Neal McDonough; Alicia Witt
- Cinematography: Bella Gonzales
- Edited by: Zeborah Tidwell
- Music by: Mark Sayfritz
- Production companies: Twisted Pictures; Envision Media Arts
- Distributed by: Republic Pictures
- Release date: February 6, 2026
- Running time: 90 minutes
- Country: United States
- Language: English

Twisted is a 2026 American horror thriller film directed by Darren Lynn Bousman and written by Jonathan Bernstein and James Greer. It stars Djimon Hounsou, Lauren LaVera, Mia Healey, Gina Philips, Neal McDonough, and Alicia Witt. The film was released on digital VOD by Republic Pictures on February 6, 2026.

== Plot ==
Two millennials scam unsuspecting tenants by renting out expensive New York City apartments that they do not actually own. The scheme works until they encounter an apartment owner with a hidden agenda, who turns the tables on them.

== Cast ==
- Djimon Hounsou as Dr. Kezian
- Lauren LaVera as Paloma
- Mia Healey as Smith
- Gina Philips as Detective Warricker
- Alicia Witt as Rebecca
- Neal McDonough as Bradshaw
- Jacob Lukas Anderson as Detective Crace
- Renes Rivera as Lenny
- David Call as Tad
- Victor Del Rio as Zac
- Michael Lombardi as Greg

== Production ==
In October 2024, it was reported that Djimon Hounsou, Lauren LaVera, and Mia Healey were cast in leading roles in the film, then titled The Monster. Alicia Witt, Neal McDonough, Gina Philips, Jacob Lukas Anderson, Victor Del Rio, Michael Lombardi and David Call were later cast. Darren Lynn Bousman signed on to direct from a script by James Greer and Jonathan Bernstein. Lee Nelson and David Tish from Envision Media Arts, and Mark Burg of Twisted Pictures produced the film.

Principal photography began in November 2024 for five weeks, taking place in Danbury and New Haven, Connecticut.

== Release ==
In December 2024, Republic Pictures acquired worldwide distribution rights to the film. Its original title, The Monster was changed to Twisted, and it was released on digital VOD on February 6, 2026.

== Reception ==
Daniel Kurland of Bloody Disgusting gave the film a rating of two out of five, writing: "There are pieces of a decent movie in Twisted, but it's cobbled together in such a messy and disruptive manner. Sweeping tonal and perspective shifts create an unnatural atmosphere that attempts to do too much with too little". Karina Adelgaard of Heaven of Horror also rated it two out of five and she wrote: "Twisted is a new horror-thriller from Darren Lynn Bousman, who still seems to believe he's making a Saw movie. He certainly uses the exact same shots and cuts as he did for those. Other than that, the storyline and pacing are quite unimpressive, and the acting suffers from this as well".

Josh Korngut of Dread Central gave the film a rating of three out of five: "Twisted hails from an all-star team of talent who elevate what could have been disposable gore schlock neatly above its pay grade".
