= Halloween Pussy Trap Kill! Kill! =

- Directed by: Jared Cohn
- Written by: Jared Cohn
- Produced by: Kelly Erin Decker; David S. Sterling; Tasha Tacosa
- Starring: Sara Malakul Lane; Richard Grieco; Dave Mustaine
- Production company: Cleopatra Entertainment
- Distributed by: Cleopatra Entertainment
- Release date: October 27, 2017
- Country: USA
- Language: English

Halloween Pussy Trap Kill! Kill! is a 2017 American horror film directed by Jared Cohn.

== Plot ==
All-girl punk rock band "Kill, Pussy, Kill!" are captured by "The Mastermind" after performing at a Halloween gig. They awaken to discover that the only way to survive the night is to make their way through a series of trapped rooms. While The Mastermind watches on the band must try to survive rooms rigged with gas, acid and other lethal devices. In the end, they must kill each other to survive.

== Cast ==
- Sara Malakul Lane - Amber Stardust
- Richard Grieco - Dale
- Demetrius Stear - DJ Speed
- Lauren Parkinson - Cat Sloane
- Nicole Sterling - Natalia Midnight
- Kelly Lynn Reiter - Bridgette Van Mars
- Kelly McCart - Misty Megan Strange
- Jed Rowen - The Mastermind
  - Dave Mustaine - The Mastermind (voice)
- Paul Logan - Captain Lewis
- Margaret O'Brien - Bridgette's Grandmother

== Reception ==
Critics negatively compared the film to the Saw franchise, while some praised the film's use of music.
