= Winner (2024 film) =

Canadian comedy drama biopic film

- Theatrical release poster
- Directed by: Susanna Fogel
- Screenplay by: Kerry Howley; Susanna Fogel
- Based on: "Who Is Reality Winner?" by Kerry Howley
- Produced by: Amanda Phillips; Susanna Fogel; Shivani Rawat; Julie Goldstein; Scott Budnick; Ameet Shukla
- Starring: Emilia Jones; Connie Britton; Danny Ramirez; Kathryn Newton; Zach Galifianakis
- Cinematography: Steve Yedlin
- Edited by: Joseph Krings
- Music by: Heather McIntosh
- Production companies: Big Beach; ShivHans Pictures; 1Community
- Distributed by: Vertical
- Release dates: January 20, 2024 (Sundance); September 13, 2024 (United States)
- Running time: 103 minutes
- Countries: Canada; United States
- Language: English

Winner is a 2024 black comedy drama film directed by Susanna Fogel and written by Fogel and Kerry Howley. The film stars Emilia Jones as Reality Winner. It also stars Connie Britton, Danny Ramirez, Kathryn Newton and Zach Galifianakis.

The film is based on the life of Reality Winner, who leaked an intelligence report about Russian interference in the 2016 United States elections.

It had its world premiere at the 2024 Sundance Film Festival on January 20, 2024, and was released on September 13, 2024, by Vertical.

== Plot ==
Reality is raised by her mother Billie, a social worker, and father Ron, an unemployed writer, in Texas. Reality has an interest in social justice and languages. She joins the Air Force out of high school, hoping to provide aid in Afghanistan. Instead, she is assigned to Fort Meade to run surveillance on the Taliban. One night, Reality and her coworker KayLee Thompson pick up a translation about a suspicious package, which results in five individuals being shot. To cope, she becomes a fitness enthusiast and starts volunteering. She begins seeing Andre, a local bartender and aspiring veterinarian.

The Winner family dynamic deteriorates—Reality's sister Brittany marries her conservative boyfriend Taylor and Billie is divorcing Ron, who has become depressed and addicted to alcohol and pills. Two years later, Reality is intrigued by Edward Snowden's leaks.

Fed up with the violence incurred by her job, Reality applies for an NGO giving humanitarian aid in Pakistan, but is rejected for her lack of a college degree. Her relationship with Andre ends. In order to pay for Ron's healthcare, Reality joins Pluribus, a contractor for the National Security Agency.

The NSA office is inundated with Fox News coverage about potential Russian interference in American elections. A curious Reality finds evidence of such in the NSA's files and saves a copy for herself. Ron is hospitalized for congestive heart failure; on his deathbed, he encourages her to keep working for her beliefs. She prints out the evidence, sneaks it out of the Pluribus office, and mails it to The Intercept.

Days later, Reality is met outside her home by the FBI. She is interrogated, arrested, and denied bail. Legal proceedings focus on her interest in languages and sarcastic sense of humor to paint her as a terrorist, and she is placed in solitary. Billie works to humanize Reality in the media. Reality is eventually sentenced to five years in federal prison, where she is able to meet her mother and sister. She wonders if the leak was worth it.

== Cast ==
- Emilia Jones as Reality Winner
  - Annelise Pollmann as young Reality
- Kathryn Newton as Brittany Winner, Reality's sister
  - Averie Peters as young Brittany
- Connie Britton as Billie Winner, Reality and Brittany's mother
- Zach Galifianakis as Ron Winner, Reality and Brittany's father
- Danny Ramirez as Andre
- Shannon Berry as KayLee Thompson

== Production ==
Described as a darkly comedic biopic, Emilia Jones was confirmed to be portraying the whistle-blower Reality Winner from a script written by Kerry Howley based on her own 2017 New York magazine feature, "Who Is Reality Winner?," with Susanna Fogel also on board to direct. It marks the second collaboration between Fogel and Jones following Cat Person.

=== Casting ===
In October 2022, it was confirmed that principal photography had started with Connie Britton and Zach Galifianakis playing Winner’s parents and Kathryn Newton as her sister. In May 2023, it was revealed Shannon Berry was part of the cast.

=== Filming ===
Filming started around the areas in Winnipeg and elsewhere in Manitoba, and was wrapped in November 21, 2022.

== Release ==
The film premiered at the 2024 Sundance Film Festival on January 20, 2024. In May 2024, Vertical acquired distribution rights to the film. It was released on September 13, 2024.

== Reception ==
On the review aggregator website Rotten Tomatoes, 56% of 36 critics' reviews are positive, with an average rating of 5.10/10. The website's consensus reads: "Susanna Fogel's comprehensive take on this true story has some rooting interest thanks in part to Emilia Jones' engaging performance, but a discordantly jaunty tone keeps it from being a real winner." Metacritic, which uses a weighted average, assigned the film a score of 56 out of 100, based on 9 critics, indicating "mixed or average" reviews.

== See also ==
- Reality (2023), another film based on Reality Winner
