= Jenna Clause =

First Nations Canadian actress (born 1999)

- Born: Buffalo, New York, U.S.
- Occupation: Actress
- Years active: 2015–present
- Known for: The Wilds

Jenna Clause is a First Nations (Cayuga) Canadian actress known for playing Martha Blackburn on the American drama The Wilds.

Clause was born in Buffalo, New York and raised in Southern Ontario. She is a Cayuga Nation Wolf Clan Member of the Haudenosaune people from Six Nations of the Grand River near Brantford, Ontario. Growing up she took acting classes in School of Dramatic Arts and Imagination Drama School in Niagara Falls. Clause also played lacrosse.

Clause appeared in smaller films You're It and The Furies Inside Me before being cast as Ojibwe character Martha Blackburn on The Wilds. In an interview with The Advocate, Clause discussed acting on a show that featured Indigenous characters and representing a culture other than her own stating: "it was so important to me that I got every little bit correct." Her character's feature episode was directed by Navajo filmmaker Sydney Freeland.

In 2025, Clause appeared in two episodes of HBO's It - Welcome to Derry, portraying Dyani.
