= The Leech (2022 film) =

The Leach
- Directed by: Eric Pennycoff
- Written by: Eric Pennycoff
- Produced by: Eric Pennycoff; Scott Smith; Adelyn Pennycoff
- Starring: Jeremy Gardner; Graham Skipper; Taylor Zaudtke
- Production company: Doomcroak Pictures
- Distributed by: Arrow Films
- Release date: 23 June 2022 (Chattanooga Film Festival)
- Country: United States
- Language: English

The Leech is a 2022 American holiday comedy horror film directed by Eric Pennycoff and starring Jeremy Gardner, Taylor Zaudtke and Graham Skipper.

== Cast ==
- Jeremy Gardner as Terry
- Taylor Zaudtke as Lexi
- Graham Skipper as Father David
- Rigo Garay as Rigo

== Release ==
The film premiered at the Chattanooga Film Festival on 23 June 2022.

== Reception ==
Michelle Swope of the Daily Dead rated the film 4 stars out of 5, calling it "the obscenely fun, naughty Christmas horror comedy you didn’t know you needed." Mary Beth McAndrews of Dread Central rated the film 3.5 stars out of 5, writing "‘The Leech’ is a sin-filled stocking stuffed with chaos, whiskey, cocaine, and dildos. And yet, it still could have been weirder."
