= Hunters (2016 TV series) =

American television drama series

- Genre: Science fiction; Drama; Thriller; Crime
- Created by: Natalie Chaidez
- Based on: Alien Hunter by Whitley Strieber
- Starring: Nathan Phillips; Britne Oldford; Mark Coles Smith; Lewis Fitz-Gerald; Laura Gordon; Shannon Berry; Gareth Davies; Sarah Peirse; Edwina Wren; Julian McMahon
- Composer: Andy Gray
- Countries of origin: United States; Australia
- Original language: English
- No. of seasons: 1
- No. of episodes: 13

Production
- Executive producers: Emile Levisetti; Natalie Chaidez; Gale Anne Hurd
- Production location: Melbourne, Australia
- Camera setup: Single-camera
- Production companies: Valhalla Entertainment; Universal Cable Productions

Original release
- Network: Syfy
- Release: April 11 – July 11, 2016

Hunters is an American drama television series that aired on Syfy, created by Natalie Chaidez and executive produced by Chaidez, Emile Levisetti and Gale Anne Hurd. Based on Whitley Strieber's best-selling novel Alien Hunter, the series premiered on April 11, 2016. It was originally going to air at 10/9c on Monday nights before the final six episodes were abruptly pushed back two hours in the schedule to Tuesdays at midnight due to the series' poor performance in the previous slot.

Syfy announced Hunters' cancellation on July 8, 2016.

== Premise ==
Hunters centers around the disappearance of a decorated Philadelphia cop's wife when he discovers an organization that hunts down alien terrorists.

== Production ==
Developed in 2013, Hunters was ordered by Syfy in September 2014 with a straight 13-episode pick up. At the time there were no casting announcements. Production began in Melbourne, Australia. Each episode takes its title from a different song by the British band Orchestral Manoeuvres in the Dark.

== Cast ==
- Nathan Phillips as Flynn Carroll
- Britne Oldford as Allison Regan
- Mark Coles Smith as Dylan Briggs
- Lewis Fitz-Gerald as Truss Jackson
- Laura Gordon as Abby Carroll
- Shannon Berry as Emme Dawson
- Gareth Davies as Jules Callaway
- Sarah Peirse as Finnerman
- Edwina Wren as Michelle James
- Julian McMahon as Lionel McCarthy
- Alex Menglet as Havi
- Gareth Yuen as Jeff
- Craig Hall as Ted Regan

== Episodes ==
No.	Title	Directed by	Teleplay by	Original release date	US viewers (millions)
1	"The Beginning & the End"	Ernest R. Dickerson & Emile Levisetti	Natalie Chaidez	April 11, 2016	0.54
2	"Messages"	Glendyn Ivin	Ron Milbauer & Terri Hughes Burton	April 18, 2016	0.43
3	"Maid of Orleans"	Rowan Woods	Natalie Chaidez	April 25, 2016	0.40
4	"Love and Violence"	Daina Reid	Richard E. Robbins	May 2, 2016	0.32
5	"Her Body in My Soul"	Glendyn Ivin	Sean Tretta	May 9, 2016	0.37
6	"Bunker Soldier"	Daina Reed	Bret VandenBos & Brandon Willer	May 16, 2016	0.29
7	"Kissing the Machine"	Rowan Woods	Natalie Chaidez & Devin Hughes	May 23, 2016	0.26
8	"The More I See You"	Mat King	Tony Elliot	May 30, 2016	0.17
9	"Promise"	Daniel Nettheim	Ron Milbauer & Terri Hughes Burton	June 6, 2016	0.25
10	"Our System"	Mat King	Sean Tretta	June 13, 2016	0.29
11	"Telegraph"	Kriv Stenders	Bret VandenBos & Brandon Willer	June 20, 2016	0.27
12	"Pretending to See the Future"	Kriv Stenders	Tony Elliott	June 27, 2016	0.21
13	"New Holy Ground"	Emile Levisetti	Natalie Chaidez & Devin Hughes	July 11, 2016	0.31

== Reception ==
The series has been panned by many critics. Brian Lowry from Variety called the pilot "utterly generic, conceptually cynical and instantly forgettable." Boston Herald's Mark Perigard criticized the overacting from the cast and felt that the series seems like torture porn.

Hunters sits with a 0% by critics and a 55% by audiences on Rotten Tomatoes in addition to a score of 34 from 12 critics over on Metacritic.
