= Are We Not Cats =

2016 American horror film

- Film poster
- Directed by: Xander Robin
- Written by: Xander Robin
- Produced by: Joshua Sobel; Thelonious Brooks; Xander Robin
- Starring: Michael Patrick Nicholson; Chelsea Lopez; Michael Godere
- Cinematography: Matt Clegg
- Edited by: Dustin Waldman; Xander Robin
- Music by: Garret H. Morris; DJ Burn One
- Production company: Greatest Planet On Earth
- Distributed by: Cleopatra Entertainment
- Release dates: September 9, 2016 (Venice); February 13, 2018
- Running time: 77 minutes
- Country: United States
- Language: English
- Budget: $90,000

Are We Not Cats is a 2016 American horror romance film written and directed by Xander Robin, about two strangers who spark romance through an unusual habit. The film stars Michael Patrick Nicholson, Chelsea Lopez, and Michael Godere.

The film premiered at the 73rd Venice International Film Festival and was listed as one of the top 10 horror films of 2018 by Rotten Tomatoes.

== Synopsis ==
After losing his job, girlfriend, and home in a single day, Eli, a desperate twenty-something accepts a delivery job in a remote upstate backwater. There he meets Anya, a beguiling young woman with whom he shares a strange habit.

Eli's skin picking is reminiscent of excoriation disorder and trichotillomania, while Anya's hair picking is reminiscent of trichotillomania and trichophagia, leading to a climactic case of Rapunzel syndrome.

== Cast ==
- Michael Patrick Nicholson as Eli
- Chelsea Lopez as Anya
- Michael Godere as Kyle
- Dean Holtermann as Al
- Charles Gould as Ari
- Adeline Thery as Madeline
- Alice Frank as Alice
- Tuffy Questell as Dennis
- Theodore Bouloukos as Dr. Mooney
- Carson Grant as Hawke
- Joe Buldo as Jack
- Ernst Zorin as Shvitzer Sam
- Marika Daciuk as Sonia
- Bill Weeden as Diner Dad
- Alex Goldberg as Max

== Release ==
The film had its world premiere at the 73rd Venice International Film Festival as the closing film of the Critics Week sidebar.

It later screened at 2016 Sitges Film Festival, Stockholm International Film Festival, Oldenburg International Film Festival, Chicago International Film Festival, and won best narrative feature at the 2017 Sidewalk Film Festival.

Are We Not Cats was released in North America in 2018 by Cleopatra Entertainment.

It was later released to stream on Shudder.

== Reception ==
On Rotten Tomatoes, the film has a rating of 91%, based on 11 reviews. On Metacritic, it has a score of 68 out of 100, based on reviews from 5 critics, indicating "generally favorable" reviews.
