= Michael Patrick Nicholson =

American actor

Michael Patrick Nicholson is an American actor. He starred in Are We Not Cats and Sadistic Intentions, as well as in other international productions like 2017 drama film Nobody's Watching, where he took part in the cast along Argentine actors Guillermo Pfening and Elena Roger, as well as other Latin American artists.
