= Golden Boy (New Zealand TV series) =

- Genre: Comedy
- Created by: Eli Matthewson; Nic Sampson; Thomas Ward
- Starring: Hayley Sproull; Kimberley Crossman; Rima Te Wiata; Dean O'Gorman; James Rolleston; Erana James; Alison Bruce; Rawiri Paratene
- Theme music composer: Stephen Gallagher
- Country of origin: New Zealand
- Original language: English
- No. of seasons: 2
- No. of episodes: 16 (+ pilot)

Production
- Executive producer: John McDonald
- Producer: Bronwynn Bakker
- Running time: 23 minutes
- Production company: MediaWorks

Original release
- Network: Three
- Release: July 16, 2019 – November 3, 2020

Golden Boy is a New Zealand comedy television series.

== Premise ==
The series chronicles the journey of aspiring journalist Mitch, sister of star rugby player Tama – with whom their small hometown is obsessed, adding an interesting dynamic to Mitch's pursuit of her journalistic ambitions.

== Cast and characters ==
- Hayley Sproull as Mitch
- Kimberley Crossman as Lisa
- Rima Te Wiata as Susan
- Dean O'Gorman as Aussie Dave
- James Rolleston as Tama
- Erana James as Kahu
- Alison Bruce as Carol
- Rawiri Paratene as Bertie

== Series overview ==
Season	Episodes	Originally released		Viewers (in millions)
Season	Episodes	First released	Last released	Viewers (in millions)
Pilot	1	September 25, 2018		TBA
1	8	July 16, 2019	September 3, 2019	TBA
2	8	September 15, 2020	November 3, 2020	TBA

== Episodes ==
=== Pilot ===
No. overall	No. in season	Title	Directed by	Written by	Original release date
0	1	"Pilot"	Jackie van Beek	Alice Snedden, Eli Matthewson & Nic Sampson	September 25, 2018

=== Season 1 ===
No. overall	No. in season	Title	Directed by	Written by	Original release date
1	1	"Ghost Vapes"	Chelsea Preston-Crayford & Rose Matafeo	Nic Sampson	July 16, 2019
2	2	"Crawdon Hooker"	Chelsea Preston-Crayford	Alice Snedden	July 23, 2019
3	3	"CCTV"	Rose Matafeo	Kura Forrester	July 30, 2019
4	4	"Seal"	Rose Matafeo	Brynley Stent	August 6, 2019
5	5	"Balls Out"	Leon Wadham	Eli Matthewson	August 13, 2019
6	6	"Break a Leg"	Leon Wadham	Chris Parker	August 20, 2019
7	7	"Tama, Driving & Jail"	Leon Wadham	Jono Pryor	August 27, 2019
8	8	"Pregnancy"	Leon Wadham	Alice Sneddon	September 3, 2019

=== Season 2 ===
No. overall	No. in season	Title	Directed by	Written by	Original release date
9	1	TBA	Leon Wadham	Alice Snedden	September 15, 2020
10	2	TBA	Leon Wadham	Chris Parker	September 22, 2020
11	3	TBA	Leon Wadham	Brynley Stent	September 29, 2020
12	4	TBA	Leon Wadham	Kura Forrester & Nic Sampson	October 6, 2020
13	5	TBA	Tom Furniss & Tom Sainsbury	Brynley Stent	October 13, 2020
14	6	TBA	Tom Furniss & Tom Sainsbury	Chris Parker	October 20, 2020
15	7	TBA	Tom Furniss	Eli Matthewson	October 27, 2020
16	8	TBA	Leon Wadham	Alice Snedden	November 3, 2020
