= Wetlands (2017 film) =

- Film poster
- Directed by: Emanuele Della Valle
- Written by: Emanuele Della Valle
- Produced by: Fred C. Caruso
- Starring: Adewale Akinnuoye-Agbaje; Heather Graham; Christopher McDonald; Reyna de Courcy; Jennifer Ehle
- Cinematography: Barry Markowitz
- Edited by: Ray Hubley
- Music by: Trevor Gureckis
- Production companies: Mediabend; Wetlands Productions
- Distributed by: Abramorama
- Release date: September 15, 2017
- Running time: 98 minutes
- Country: United States
- Language: English

Wetlands is a 2017 American crime thriller film written and directed by Emanuele Della Valle and starring Adewale Akinnuoye-Agbaje, Heather Graham, Christopher McDonald, Reyna De Courcy and Jennifer Ehle. Michael Shamberg served as an executive producer of the film.

== Premise ==
A disgraced Philadelphia police detective attempts to make a new start in Atlantic City with the help of his daughter and new partner.

== Cast ==
- Adewale Akinnuoye-Agbaje as Detective Babel "Babs" Johnson
- Heather Graham as Savannah
- Jennifer Ehle as Kate Sheehan
- Christopher McDonald as Detective Paddy "Red" Sheehan
- Reyna de Courcy as "Surfer Girl"
- Celeste O'Connor as Amy Johnson
- Murphy Guyer as Captain Schmidt
- Rob Morgan as Sergeant Walker
- Jake Weber as Sergeant McCulvey
- Barry Markowitz as "Lollipop"
- Louis Mustillo as Jimmy "Coconuts"
- Tyler Elliot Burke as Alfie
- Sean Ringgold as "Big G"
- Anthony Mackie
- Lauren LaVera as "Buttercup" / Pusher
- Pamela Dunlap as Mrs. Harrington
- Lynne Wintersteller as The Landlady
- Lou Morey as Kenny
- Peter Jacovini as Lollipop's Thug
- William Jacovini as Lollipop's Thug
- Vincent Riviezzo as Mobster
- Dona Gregorio as Lollipop's Girl
- Dana Kreitz as Stripper
- Justine Denea Cassady as Go-Go Dancer
- Natalie Paige Bentley as Party Girl
- Lillian Cartagena as Call Girl
- Darien Davis as Call Girl
- TJ Martin as Drunk Old Man

== Release ==
The film was released in theaters on September 15, 2017.

== Reception ==
The film has a 40% rating on Rotten Tomatoes. Peter Sobczynski of RogerEbert.com awarded the film two stars. Alan Ng of Film Threat gave the film a 2 out of 5.

Dennis Harvey of Variety gave the film a negative review and wrote, "Apparently moviemaking keeps getting easier while writing keeps getting harder — Wetlands being yet another example of a film whose surface technical polish can only do so much to gloss over the coarse, clumsy screenplay that flummoxes its cast."

Frank Scheck of The Hollywood Reporter also gave the film a negative review and wrote, "Stronger on style than substance."
