= Kerry Howley =

American writer (born 1981)

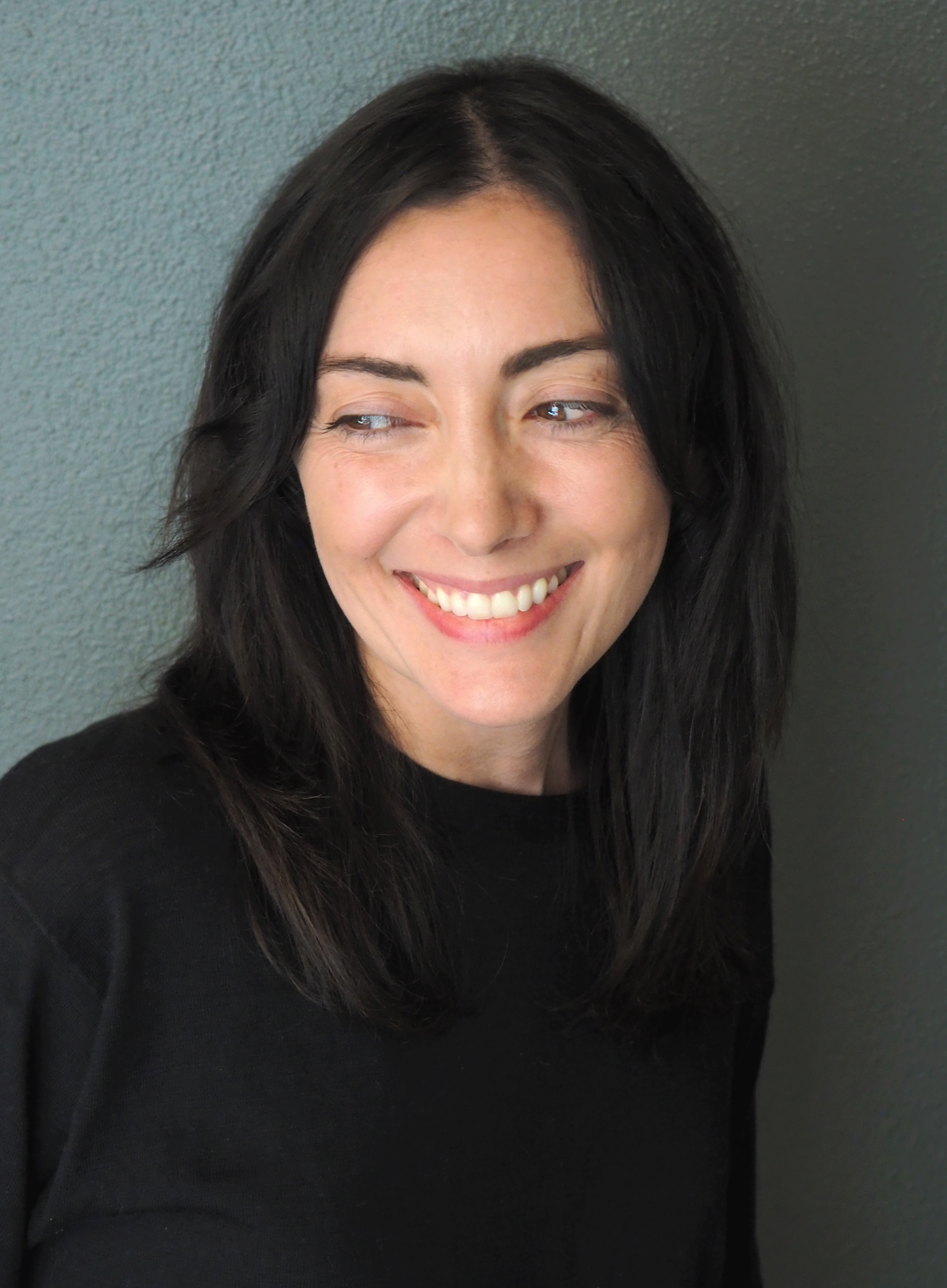
- Howley in 2021
- Born: 1981 (age 44–45)
- Education: Georgetown University (BA); University of Iowa (MFA)
- Known for: Thrown (2014)
- Spouse: Will Wilkinson
- Children: 2
- Website: Official website

Kerry Howley (born 1981) is an American feature writer at New York magazine, a professor at the University of Iowa's Nonfiction Writing Program, and a screenwriter. She is the author of the work of literary nonfiction Thrown (2014).

== Life and career ==
Howley graduated from Georgetown University and the University of Iowa's nonfiction MFA program. Prior to working at New York, she was an editor at Reason magazine. Her work has appeared in New York magazine, The Paris Review, The New Yorker, and Granta.

Howley is the author of Thrown, which was named a New York Times Notable Book, a New York Times Editor's Choice, and a best book of 2014 in Slate, Salon, Playboy, and Time. Thrown was long-listed for the PEN/ESPN Award for Literary Sportswriting and won first prize in the Next Generation Indie Book Awards.

Howley has been named a Lannan Foundation Fellow. Both her 2018 New York cover story on disgraced doctor Larry Nassar and her 2021 New York essay on January 6 were nominated for Best Feature at the National Magazine Awards.

In 2022 filming began on Winner, a film scripted by Howley based on the life of Reality Winner. It is directed by Susanna Fogel and stars Emilia Jones.

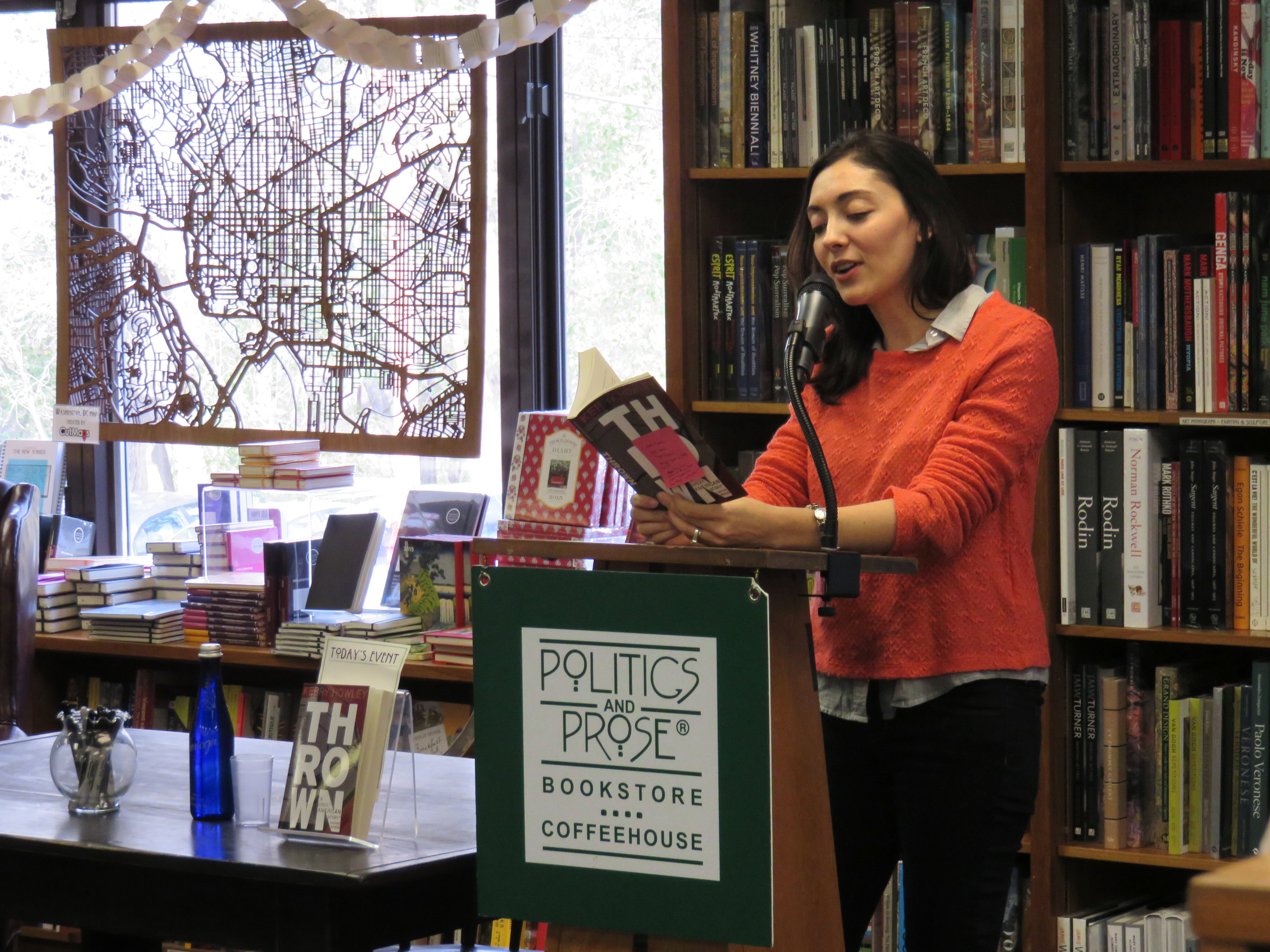
Kerry Howley at a reading of her book, Thrown at Politics and Prose, in Georgetown University, 23 November 2014

== Works ==
=== Books ===
- Thrown. Louisville, Ky.: Sarabande Books. 2014. ISBN 978-1-936747-92-4.
- Bottoms Up and the Devil Laughs. New York: Alfred A. Knopf. 2023. ISBN 9780525655497.

=== Articles ===
- "Call Me a Traitor" New York. 20 July 2021.
- "Tulsi Gabbard Had a Very Strange Childhood" New York. 11 June 2019.
- "How Did Larry Nassar Deceive So Many for So Long?" 19 November 2018.
- "Who Is Reality Winner?". New York Magazine. 25 December 2017.
- "What We Mourned When We Mourned Cecil". The New Yorker. 29 September 2015.

=== Interviews ===
- "An Interview with Kerry Howley". Bookslut (Interview). Interviewed by Jill Talbot. March 2015.
- "A Conversation with Kerry Howley, author of Thrown". The Iowa Review (Interview). Interviewed by Alea Adigweme. 2 April 2015.
- "Who Is Reality Winner?". Why is This Happening (Interview). Interviewed by Chris Hayes. MSNBC. 24 January 2020.
