= The Changeover (film) =

- Theatrical release poster (U.S.)
- Directed by: Miranda Harcourt; Stuart McKenzie
- Written by: Stuart McKenzie
- Produced by: Emma Slade; Richard Fletcher; Caroline Hutchison; John McKenzie
- Starring: Nicholas Galitzine; Erana James; Timothy Spall; Melanie Lynskey; Lucy Lawless; Kate Harcourt
- Cinematography: Andrew Stroud
- Edited by: Dan Kircher
- Music by: Andrew Thomas
- Production company: Firefly Films
- Distributed by: Radiant Films International
- Release date: 28 September 2017 (New Zealand)
- Running time: 95 minutes
- Country: New Zealand
- Language: English
- Box office: $112,749

The Changeover is a 2017 New Zealand coming-of-age fantasy horror film. Directed by Miranda Harcourt and her husband, Stuart McKenzie, it is based on the 1984 young adult novel of the same name by Margaret Mahy. Starring Timothy Spall, Melanie Lynskey, Lucy Lawless, Nicholas Galitzine and Erana James, it was released in New Zealand on 28 September 2017, followed by a limited theatrical run in the United States on 22 February 2019. The film received positive reviews from critics.

== Premise ==
Teenaged Laura, a strong-willed schoolgirl with a rare psychic gift, finds herself drawn into a terrifying battle when her younger brother falls under the curse of an ancient, human-devouring demon. With their distraught mother looking on helplessly as her son's life is drained out of him bit by bit, Laura must learn to harness her mystical powers—with the help of enigmatic outsiders Sorenson and Miryam in order to vanquish the malevolent force, save her sibling, and make peace with her true identity.

== Cast ==
- Timothy Spall as Carmody Braque/David
- Melanie Lynskey as Kate Chant
- Lucy Lawless as Miryam Carlisle
- Nicholas Galitzine as Sorensen Carlisle
- Erana James as Laura Chant
- Kate Harcourt as Winter Carlisle
- Benji Purchase as Jacko Chant
- Thomasin McKenzie as Rose Keaton

== Production ==
The film was shot in Christchurch over a five-week period in the latter half of 2016.

== Release and reception ==
The Changeover was released theatrically in New Zealand on 28 September 2017, grossing $112,749 during its run. It was generally well received by critics, with Stuff's Sarah Watt commending its "suitably New Zealand" feel and the filmmakers' decision to shoot in the red zone of Christchurch. Writing for RogerEbert.com, Matt Zoller Seitz called it "a perfect genre film", noting that "every role is perfectly cast", while also praising the writing, direction, and cinematography. In a similarly warm appraisal, the Los Angeles Times described it as "an astute adaptation [of Mahy's novel], balancing magical arcana with everyday adolescent turmoil"; while Slant Magazine's Keith Watson felt that, despite some narrative flaws, it was a "lively and engaging excursion into an unusually naturalistic world of magic". The World Socialist Web Site's Tom Peters gave a more critical review, saying the film had more in common with the Twilight series of films than with Mahy's novel.
