= The Wilds (TV series) =

American drama television series

- Genre: Drama
- Created by: Sarah Streicher
- Starring: Sophia Ali; Shannon Berry; Jenna Clause; Reign Edwards; Mia Healey; Helena Howard; Erana James; Sarah Pidgeon; David Sullivan; Troy Winbush; Rachel Griffiths; Zack Calderon; Alex Fitzalan; Charles Alexander; Nicholas Coombe; Miles Gutierrez-Riley; Aidan Laprete; Tanner Ray Rook; Reed Shannon
- Music by: Cliff Martinez
- Country of origin: United States
- Original language: English
- No. of seasons: 2
- No. of episodes: 18

Production
- Executive producers: Sarah Streicher; Jamie Tarses; Dylan Clark; Susanna Fogel; Amy B. Harris; John Polson
- Producers: Guy J. Louthan; Lena Cordina; Honor Bryne; Brian Williams
- Production locations: New Zealand; Australia
- Cinematography: Ed Wild; Rob Marsh; Peter Field; Matt Toll
- Editors: Sophie Corra; Brad Katz; Susan J. Vinci; Steve Edwards; Phillip J. Bartell; Tuan Quoc Le; Joanna Phillips; Mark Gasparo
- Running time: 42–61 minutes
- Production companies: Dylan Clark Productions; FanFare Productions; ABC Signature; Amazon Studios; A.B. Baby Productions (season 2)

Original release
- Network: Amazon Prime Video
- Release: December 11, 2020 – May 6, 2022

The Wilds is an American drama television series created by Sarah Streicher for Amazon Prime Video. The series revolves around a group of teenage girls who are left stranded on a deserted island after a plane crash, but are unaware they are the subjects of a social experiment. The cast features Sophia Ali, Reign Edwards, Shannon Berry, Jenna Clause, Mia Healey, Helena Howard, Erana James, Sarah Pidgeon, David Sullivan, Troy Winbush, and Rachel Griffiths. The first season was released on Amazon Prime Video on December 11, 2020, and received positive reviews from critics, with praise for the performances, writing, and plot. In December 2020, the series was renewed for a second season which premiered on May 6, 2022. In July 2022, the series was canceled after two seasons.

== Plot ==
A group of teenage girls from different backgrounds – Fatin Jadmani, Dot Campbell, Martha Blackburn, Rachel Reid, Shelby Goodkind, Nora Reid, Toni Shalifoe, and Leah Rilke – are on an airplane when it crashes into the ocean while en route to Hawaii for the Dawn of Eve program, a young women's empowerment retreat. They survive the crash and find themselves stranded on a deserted island. As the girls work to survive as castaways and learn about each other, they are unaware that they are subjects of a social experiment; the plane crash was staged and their stranding orchestrated by Gretchen Klein, the head of the Dawn of Eve program. The girls' adventures on the island are intercut with flashbacks scenes about their lives before the crash, and flashforward scenes to an underground bunker where two men claiming to be FBI agents, Daniel Faber and Dean Young, interview the survivors after their supposed rescue.

The second season introduces a group of teenage boys: Kirin O'Conner, Rafael Garcia, Josh Herbert, Seth Novak, Ivan Taylor, Henry Tanaka, Bo Leonard and Scotty Simms. They find themselves in Klein's second orchestrated crash as part of the Twilight of Adam program. Flashing between their past, their lives on the island, and questioning by Faber and Young, the boys' stories come to light. Meanwhile, the girls (still being held in the bunker) begin to discover the truth behind their situation and attempt to reach the boys.

== Cast and characters ==
=== Main ===
- Sophia Ali as Fatin Jadmani, one of the crash survivors, a rich and promiscuous cellist from Berkeley, California
- Shannon Berry as Dorothy "Dot" Campbell, one of the crash survivors, a tough Texan girl with wilderness survival skills who cared for her dying father
- Jenna Clause as Martha Blackburn, one of the crash survivors, a kind and optimistic animal lover from an Ojibwe reservation in Minnesota
- Reign Edwards as Rachel Reid, one of the crash survivors, an uptight competitive diver from New York who later loses her right hand in a shark attack
- Mia Healey as Shelby Goodkind, one of the crash survivors, a closeted beauty pageant queen from a conservative Christian family in Texas.
- Helena Howard as Nora Reid, one of the crash survivors, Rachel's fraternal twin sister, a quiet and intelligent girl from New York
- Erana James as Toni Shalifoe, one of the crash survivors, Martha's hot-headed and openly lesbian best friend from Minnesota
- Sarah Pidgeon as Leah Rilke, one of the crash survivors, a romantic and obsessive loner from Berkeley, California
- David Sullivan as Daniel Faber, a trauma psychologist who interviews the survivors after they are rescued from the island
- Troy Winbush as Dean Young, ostensibly an FBI agent, also interviewing the survivors after they are rescued, he is more sympathetic towards the girls
- Rachel Griffiths as Gretchen Klein, the head of the Dawn of Eve and Twilight of Adam programs.
- Zack Calderon as Rafael Garcia (season 2), one of the Twilight of Adam crash survivors, a love-obsessed introvert from Tijuana who goes to school in San Diego
- Alex Fitzalan as Seth Novak (season 2), one of the Twilight of Adam crash survivors, the friendly and intelligent step-brother to Henry who harbors a dark side
- Charles Alexander as Kirin O'Conner (season 2), one of the Twilight of Adam crash survivors, a macho lacrosse player
- Nicholas Coombe as Josh Herbert (season 2), one of the Twilight of Adam crash survivors, a dorky and optimistic hypochondriac from San Diego
- Miles Gutierrez-Riley as Ivan Taylor (season 2), one of the Twilight of Adam crash survivors, a bold and witty but self-centered gay teen
- Aidan Laprete as Henry Tanaka (season 2), one of the Twilight of Adam crash survivors, the goth and pessimistic ex-boy scout and step-brother of Seth
- Tanner Ray Rook as Bo Leonard (season 2), one of the Twilight of Adam crash survivors, a sweet and orderly victim of child abuse from Florida
- Reed Shannon as Scotty Simms (season 2), Bo's protective and entrepreneurial best friend from Florida

=== Recurring ===
- James Fraser as Ian Murnen, a friend of Leah's who has a crush on her
- Jarred Blakiston as Alex, a member of Gretchen's team who is hesitant of her methods
- Jen Huang as Susan, a member of Gretchen's team
- Joe Witkowski as Thom, a member of Gretchen's team
- Barbara Eve Harris as Audrey, a member of Gretchen's team
- Elliott Giarola as Devon Klein (season 2), Gretchen's son who poses as DJ Keating, one of the crash survivors on the boys island

=== Guest ===
- Chi Nguyen as Linh Bach, Gretchen's research assistant, who poses as Jeanette Dao, one of the crash survivors, but dies on the first day
- Carter Hudson as Jeffrey Galanis (season 1), an author who Leah has a brief relationship with due to his attraction to younger women. He breaks things off after discovering that Leah lied to him about being 18.
- Greg Bryk as Tim Campbell (season 1), Dot's ailing father
- Shane Callahan as James Reid (season 1), Nora and Rachel's father
- Ddé Dionne Gipson as Angela Reid (season 1), Nora and Rachel's mother
- Jose Velazquez as Mateo (season 1), a nurse who looks after Dot's father and starts developing feelings for her
- Bella Shepard as Regan (season 1), Toni's ex-girlfriend
- Poorna Jagannathan as Rana Jadmani, Fatin's mother
- Alireza Ghadiri as Ahmad Jadmani, Fatin's father
- Warren Kole as Dave Goodkind, Shelby's father. He runs bible study sessions and a Christian-themed spin cycle studio.
- Stefania LaVie Owen as Becca Gilroy, Shelby's best friend who she secretly has romantic feelings for
- Bonnie Soper as JoBeth Goodkind, Shelby's mother
- Kimberly Guerrero as Bernice Blackburn, Martha's mother
- Lewis Fitz-Gerald as Dr. Ted Wolchak, a doctor who sexually abused Martha, and several other girls, when she was a child
- Johnny Berchtold as Quinn, Nora's ex-boyfriend who she meets during summer session at a college campus
- Victoria Moroles as Marisol Nunez (season 2), Rafael's girlfriend
- Ben Folds as himself (season 2), who appears in Leah's hallucinations.
- Rainbow Wedell as Lena (season 2).

== Episodes ==
=== Series overview ===
Season	Episodes	Originally released
1	10	December 11, 2020
2	8	May 6, 2022

=== Season 1 (2020) ===
No. overall	No. in season	Title	Directed by	Written by	Featured character	Original release date
1	1	"Day One"	Susanna Fogel	Sarah Streicher	Leah	December 11, 2020
En route to the Dawn of Eve retreat in Hawaii, nine teenage girls — Rachel, Nora, Martha, Toni, Shelby, Dot, Leah, Fatin, and Jeanette – are stranded on a remote island after their plane crashes. Most of the girls are uninjured, but Jeanette dies from internal bleeding. The girls attempt to call for help using Dot's phone, but its battery dies. Unknown to the girls, Gretchen Klein, the organizer of the Dawn of Eve program, is monitoring them via hidden cameras on the island; Jeanette was an undercover operative working for Gretchen, as is one of the surviving girls. Flashbacks: Leah's life before the crash: she had a sexual relationship with Jeffrey, a novelist; when Jeffrey discovered that Leah lied about being 18 years old, he broke off the relationship. Flashforwards: sometime after being rescued from the island, Leah is being debriefed by FBI investigators Daniel Faber and Dean Young. She tells them that, while everyone else was asleep, Leah found Jeanette's phone and called Jeffrey, but was too anxious to say anything before the phone died.
2	2	"Day Two"	John Polson	Sarah Streicher	Rachel	December 11, 2020
Leah tells the others about Jeanette's phone, but does not tell them she called Jeffrey. Rachel is furious that Jeanette had a working phone and didn't tell the others about it. Toni becomes jealous of Shelby and Martha's growing friendship. Rachel leads an expedition to the top of a hill to get a view of the island, planning to use Fatin's mirror to signal for help. Rachel accidentally throws the mirror over a cliff during an argument; Leah tries to retrieve it, but fails. Meanwhile, Gretchen continues to watch the girls, and arranges for them to discover a bag containing medicine, ostensibly belonging to the crashed plane's pilot. Flashbacks: Rachel was a competitive diver whose coach told her she didn't have the body for the sport. As a result, Rachel develops severe bulimia to lose weight, straining her relationship with her sister Nora; she hits her head and falls during a crucial dive. Flashforwards: Rachel's interview with Faber and Young reveal that Rachel lost her right hand before being rescued.
3	3	"Day Three"	John Polson	Daniel Paige	Dot	December 11, 2020
Dot and Shelby search for shelter for the group and bond along the way before eventually finding a cave. Meanwhile, Rachel, Leah and Nora swim out to the plane wreckage in an attempt to find more supplies. Rachel and Leah make numerous dives in an attempt to retrieve the plane's flight recorder; Rachel nearly drowns Leah by holding her underwater. They eventually retrieve the flight recorder and the girls argue over whether to open it; they eventually vote to open it, and listen to the recording of the pilot calling for help as the plane crashes. Flashbacks: Dot sold drugs to students at her and Shelby’s school (including Shelby's cheating boyfriend) while caring for her ailing father, Tim. He eventually asks Dot to euthanize him, which she reluctantly does; Tim's last request is for her to go on the Dawn of Eve retreat. Later, Gretchen meets with Dot and offers her the trip for free. Dot cynically responds that nothing is free, and wonders what Gretchen really wants from her. Flashforwards: Dot is interviewed by Faber and Young.
4	4	"Day Six"	Cherie Nowlan	Tonya Kong	Toni	December 11, 2020
When a bag of chips washes ashore, the girls have a shelter-building contest to determine who gets it. Leah clashes with Fatin over the latter's lack of effort; Leah shoves Fatin after she teases Leah about her relationship with Jeffrey. Toni continues to clash with Shelby about her attempts to take charge, and with Martha over her budding friendship with Shelby. She eventually loses control and angrily wrecks their team's shelter, upsetting Martha, who says she's tired of cleaning up Toni's messes. That night, Fatin leaves the newly-constructed shelter after an argument with Leah. Flashbacks: Toni is in the foster system, as her mother is in rehab. At school, Toni starts dating new girl Regan, but they break up due to Toni's short temper and inability to avoid conflict. After their breakup, Martha comforts Toni and invites her to stay at her house. Flashforwards: Toni tells Faber and Young that the flight recorder was a "cocktease", as nothing ever came of it.
5	5	"Day Seven"	Haifaa Al-Mansour	Shalisha Francis-Feusner	Fatin	December 11, 2020
The next morning, Fatin is still missing, and Toni finds some of Fatin's clothing bloodstained. The group venture into the forest to search for her, with Nora staying behind to tend to the fire. Whilst looking for Fatin, Rachel gets stuck in a puddle of mud, and the others manage to save her. At the same time, Nora prevents the fire from burning out by burning some pages of a journal. Eventually they find Fatin, who has discovered a pond, finally giving the girls a source of fresh water; observing them, Gretchen notes the milestone. Back at camp, Fatin and Leah reconcile and burn Leah's copy of Jeffrey's book. That night, the girls go to bury Jeanette's body deeper, but discover it missing. Flashbacks: Fatin is a star cellist who is forced to play by her overbearing mother. When she discovers her father cheating on her mother, she publicly shames him by sending his nude photos to all his contacts; however, her mother takes her father's side, and they decide to transfer Fatin to a religious boarding school after she returns from the retreat. Flashforwards: Fatin is interviewed by Faber and Young, and they discuss Leah's growing paranoia about the island.
6	6	"Day Twelve"	Alison Maclean	Sarah Streicher	Leah	December 11, 2020
Jeanette's body is transported back to Gretchen. Rachel discovers mussels, providing a feast for all except Shelby, who claims to be allergic. Shelby's poorly-concealed homophobia toward Toni is criticized by the others. Soon all except Shelby develop food poisoning from the mussels, with Toni suffering the worst symptoms. Leah goes to retrieve the bag of medicine. Seeing Shelby behaving suspiciously, Leah briefly drops the bag to follow her, losing some of the pills. Once they return, Shelby forces Toni to take the only remaining anti-nausea pill. That night, Martha faints, and Leah admits she lost some of the pills. Meanwhile, Gretchen admits herself to a psychiatric hospital in order to meet Faber and offer him a job. Flashbacks: Leah's friend Ian tries to kiss her during a camping trip, but she storms off when he criticizes Jeffrey's treatment of her; later, she accuses Ian of telling Jeffrey she was under 18. Leah is later hit by a car after attending a party; at the hospital her parents express their worries about her depression. Flashforwards: Faber talks with Leah in her room; he criticizes her tendency to be obsessive and paranoid, and he eventually has her sedated.
7	7	"Day Fifteen"	Ed Wild	Melissa Blake	Jeanette	December 11, 2020
A high tide floods the beach, washing many of the girls' supplies out to sea; they move camp to another location. Shelby finds two more suitcases "washed up", full of valuable supplies; suspicious of the convenient discovery and Shelby's secretive behavior, Leah accuses Shelby of knowing something about their situation the others don't. Shelby reveals her secret: she is missing two teeth and wears dentures. In private, Toni advises Shelby to take advantage of the opportunity to be free from her family's expectations, and Shelby kisses her. Meanwhile, Nora reveals that Rachel was cut from the diving team and is not going to Stanford, causing the two to fight until Dot puts a stop to it. Later, a plane flies over the island and notices the girls, giving them hope of rescue. Flashbacks: Jeanette was actually Linh Bach, an Australian graduate student whom Gretchen recruited as a research assistant for her study on how society would develop in the absence of patriarchy. Linh almost backed out when she saw the other girls drugged to stage the fake plane crash (reminding her of a past sexual assault) and was accidentally injured falling off a dock, but decided to continue with the project, ultimately leading to her death.
8	8	"Day Sixteen"	Tara Nicole Weyr	Amy B. Harris & Melissa Blake	Shelby	December 11, 2020
Gretchen pulls strings to prevent the pilot who saw the girls from rescuing them. The girls, believing rescue is imminent, eat most of their remaining food, including some cannabis edibles. While high, the girls discuss plans for their lives after being rescued. Toni assures Shelby that she didn't tell Martha about their kiss. Rachel acknowledges her time as a diver is done. In the woods, Martha spots Alex, one of Gretchen's assistants, but under the influence of cannabis she mistakes him for a mannequin. When she brings the other girls to show them, a mannequin has been placed there. That night, Shelby cuts off some of her hair while having a mental breakdown. Later, Leah apologizes to Shelby for suspecting her. Flashbacks: Shelby's life as a teen beauty pageant participant; her controlling father runs conversion therapy sessions. Trying on dresses for a pageant, Shelby kisses her best friend, Becca; after her parents find out, Shelby asks Becca to stay away from her. Later, she learns that Becca has committed suicide. Flashforwards: Shelby is being interviewed by Faber and Young; she now has a buzz cut. She demands to be allowed to see Leah; when they meet, she secretly slips Leah a note.
9	9	"Day Twenty-Two"	Sydney Freeland	J.L. Tiggett	Martha	December 11, 2020
Rescue has not arrived, and the girls have been out of food for two days. Toni, Martha and Shelby forage for food in the woods. To Martha's disgust, Shelby suggests they kill an animal. Martha lets a goat escape, angering the others, but later finds it on her own and kills it. Shelby and Toni find a lychee tree; the two kiss again and then have sex. Meanwhile, Nora realizes that Rachel is now afraid of swimming and tries to persuade her to return to the water. Suspicious and delirious, Leah tries to swim away from the island; Rachel dives in and saves her from drowning. That night, Leah discovers Nora talking to Gretchen's team, as she is the surviving informant. Flashbacks: Martha was one of several girls sexually abused by a doctor who helped her after an injury, but remains in denial about it. Martha initially refuses to testify against him; eventually, once she agrees to speak to the grand jury, she lies by saying he didn't do anything. Flashforwards: Young reads through files about the girls, including Nora's journal; he suggests to Gretchen that they could use Martha's perjury as leverage to prevent her family from suing.
10	10	"Day Twenty-Three"	John Polson	Sarah Streicher	Nora	December 11, 2020
The next morning, Shelby tells Toni she enjoyed their night, but that she isn't ready to talk about it. Martha gets the others to help her carry the goat to camp. Leah pretends not to remember anything from the night before, but follows Nora into the woods to search for hidden cameras; Nora tricks her into falling into a pit. Shelby and Toni talk about their feelings for each other. Leah escapes from the pit and returns to camp, but before she can tell the others about Nora's betrayal, Rachel is attacked by a shark and Nora runs into the water to save her. Flashbacks: Nora is dating a boy named Quinn over the summer, but breaks up with him because Rachel dislikes him. In the fall, Nora discovers Quinn was killed in a hazing accident. She meets Gretchen and discovers Quinn was killed by Gretchen's son. Gretchen recruits Nora into her study. Flashforwards: Leah reads Shelby's note: "You were right." She convinces Young to let her outside for fresh air; when he returns her to her room, she manages to leave the door unlocked. That night, she leaves her room and discovers a room of screens monitoring a male group of castaways, the "Twilight of Adam."

=== Season 2 (2022) ===
No. overall	No. in season	Title	Directed by	Written by	Featured character(s)	Original release date
11	1	"Day 30 / 1"	Alison Maclean	Sarah Streicher	Rafael	May 6, 2022
Rachel loses her right hand to the shark attack, and Nora is swept out to sea trying to rescue her and presumed dead. As the girls move their camp inland, Rachel is stunned with grief. Unable to prove that Nora knew the group was stranded intentionally, Leah tries to get information about Nora from Rachel; Rachel lashes out at her, blaming herself for her sister's death. Eventually, Dot persuades Rachel to move inland with the others. Meanwhile, a parallel experiment has begun with nine boys on an island: Rafael, Josh, Scotty, Bo, Kirin, Ivan, Henry, Seth, and DJ. On their first day stranded, they split up to search the island. They reunite to find DJ dead, his body apparently mutilated by a wild animal. Unknown to them, DJ's death was faked; he is Gretchen's son Devon, who killed Nora's ex-boyfriend, Quinn. Flashforwards: Rafael tells Young and Faber that some of the stranded boys became monsters as a result of their experiences; when he returns to his room, Leah is there waiting for him.
12	2	"Day 34 / 12"	Alison Maclean	Melissa Blake	Rafael	May 6, 2022
Food supplies are running low on the boys' island. Rafael spills a jar of salsa and, embarrassed, flees to the woods. Seth joins him, and together they find an underground bunker stocked with food and beer. Seth gives Rafael credit for the discovery, making him the hero of the day. On the girls' island, Rachel and Leah reconcile and find a crate of party supplies in the sea. Meanwhile, Martha is irritated by Toni's attempts to make her and Shelby get closer. Flashbacks: Rafael commuted from Tijuana to attend a private school in San Diego, where his girlfriend Marisol was the daughter of wealthy philanthropists. Rafael skipped his own family obligations to attend a charity gala with Marisol's family, but en route he got into an altercation with another motorist. He was jailed by Customs and Border Protection, and was bailed out the next day by Marisol's parents. Flashforwards: Leah promises to help Rafael escape and persuades him to confide in her. Afterward, she confronts Faber and offers to help get information from Rafael if whoever is in charge will help her in return; Gretchen accepts her offer.
13	3	"Day 36 / 14"	Nima Nourizadeh	Franklin Hardy	Bo & Scotty	May 6, 2022
At night, the boys hear a jaguar prowling around their camp. Hiding their food supply from the animal, Scotty persuades Bo to steal some jerky for themselves, concerned that the others may not be trustworthy. The next night, as the boys camp on a narrow ledge, Ivan retaliates against Kirin's homophobic jokes by revealing to the others that Kirin has gonorrhea. Worried that the jaguar will be attracted to the smell of the stolen food, and feeling guilty about stealing from the group, Bo leaves the ledge to return it; he and Scotty narrowly escape the animal on their return. Meanwhile, Toni is almost hit by a falling tree limb, and Martha confesses her fear of sex to Fatin. Flashbacks: Scotty and Bo were best friends in Florida, but Bo had to scrupulously hide any trace of their activities from his abusive and hyper-controlling parents. When one of Scotty's money-making schemes (buying some t-shirts to resell) accidentally led to Bo's father's lawnmower being flooded in a rainstorm, Bo was beaten for it. Later, the two of them vandalized a house that had been Scotty's childhood home. Flashforwards: Scotty is interviewed by Young and Gretchen.
14	4	"Day 42 / 15"	Nima Nourizadeh	Leon Chills	none	May 6, 2022
The girls throw a birthday party for Dot on the beach. When Rachel's grief for Nora resurges, Shelby commiserates with her and tells her how she used prayer to cope with her grief over Becca. Meanwhile, Seth organizes the boys to kill the jaguar: they line the bunker with sharpened stakes, cover it with leaves, and leave a small dead animal on top as bait. After the jaguar falls into the trap, Kirin stabs it to death with a spear carved by Ivan. At their victory party that evening, Kirin pantses Seth, and Seth storms away in embarrassment. Josh approaches him to sympathize, having been a bullying victim himself, but Seth shoos him away. Later, when Josh attempts to comfort Seth in the tent, Seth sexually assaults him. Flashforwards: Young and Faber promise to allow Leah to phone Jeffrey if she can get Rafael to tell her what happened later that night. He tells her the events of the day, but before he can finish, she whispers, "They're listening"; and so Rafael does not reveal what happened between Josh and Seth.
15	5	"Day 45 / 16"	Ben C. Lucas	Amy B. Harris & Leon Chills	none	May 6, 2022
Seth, who is Gretchen's second spy on the island, records a message characterizing Josh as fragile and unstable. When the boys split up to search for fresh water, Seth destroys the hidden microphones on the beach. Josh tells Kirin that he was assaulted by Seth. When the group reconvenes on the beach, Kirin publicly accuses Seth. Only Rafael believes Seth's claims of innocence; the others vote to banish Seth from the group. That night, Josh asks the group to promise never to reveal what happened to him. Meanwhile, the girls hold a funeral for Nora. Fatin persuades Leah to try to let go of her suspicions of Nora, but Fatin herself finds hidden notes in Nora's belongings that incite her own suspicions. After the funeral, Rachel sits on the beach, mourning, while Nora, alive and well, watches her via the monitors at Gretchen's headquarters. Flashforwards: Young berates Leah for not letting Rafael finish his story, but gives her a hint that allows her to find a cell phone hidden in her room. Meanwhile, Gretchen and Faber interview Bo, Kirin, Henry, and Josh, but none of them reveal why Seth was exiled.
16	6	"Day 46 / 26"	Ben C. Lucas	A. Rey Pamatmat	Ivan & Kirin	May 6, 2022
When Shelby says "I love you" to Toni for the first time, Toni panics, but Martha reminds her to find value in herself, giving her the confidence to tell Shelby she loves her too. Leah begins experiencing hallucinations of Ben Folds. When Martha finds that her hunting snares have killed a mother rabbit with nursing babies, she has a nervous breakdown and kills the babies as well. When the boys find that Seth has their only lighter, they track him down and take it back; Ivan and Rafael are disturbed by the violent way Seth is treated. After Rafael takes pity on Seth and brings him fresh water and a sweater, Josh insists on exiling him from the camp as well; Ivan self-exiles to bring Rafael and Seth a candle on a cold night. Flashbacks: Ivan led a campaign to get Kirin's lacrosse coach fired for wearing a blackface Halloween costume. When he found Kirin mourning the coach's career, Ivan baited him into a homophobic rant to get him expelled from school; Ivan's boyfriend left him in disgust, leaving a note saying "Be tender". Flashforwards: Ivan refuses to explain the cause of the divisions among the boys.
17	7	"Day 50 / 33"	Aurora Guerrero	Franklin Hardy	Seth	May 6, 2022
The girls decide to move a still catatonic Martha. When she nearly drowns, Toni lashes out at the group. As more of the boys are exiled from the main camp, the outcasts realize that they outnumber the main camp. Seth proposes merging the groups back together. However, the fragile peace falls apart when Seth refuses to leave Josh alone, aggressively trying to befriend him. Seth is exiled by the group a second time. Flashbacks: Seth took care of his friend Julia after she has a bad night with her boyfriend. The morning after they had sex and Seth became increasingly obsessed with Julia, especially after she returned to her boyfriend. This culminated in Seth stealing her cat. Flashforwards: Gretchen approaches Josh to get the truth about what happened to the boys.
18	8	"Exodus"	Ben Young	Sarah Streicher	none	May 6, 2022
Fatin and Shelby find evidence that they were brought to the island on purpose and that Nora was part of the plan. They decide to keep it from the group, but before they can investigate further a helicopter arrives. Seth approaches the boys claiming that he found the boat that was supposed to rescue him when he demanded extraction from Gretchen. He volunteers to go out in search of rescue. Distrusting him, Kirin offers to go with Seth and Raf joins in an attempt to keep the peace. The plan goes awry when Kirin falls overboard and Seth urges Raf to hit Kirin with an oar and abandon him. Instead, Raf turns on Seth but, as he is pummeling him, Kirin spots a rescue boat. Flashfowards: The boys' and girls' groups finally join together. However, they find the facility abandoned as Gretchen, her son, and the other workers flee the facility. Gretchen reveals that she still has someone on the inside. As the group realizes they are still stuck on the island, music starts playing. It is revealed that Seth is the one playing the music.

== Production ==
=== Development ===
On June 28, 2018, Amazon Studios gave production a pilot order. On August 3, 2018, it was announced that Susanna Fogel had signed on to direct the pilot and serve as executive producer. On May 28, 2019, it was announced that Amazon Studios had given the production a series order for a first season consisting of ten episodes. The series was developed by Sarah Streicher who is also expected to executive produce alongside Jamie Tarses from Fanfare; and Dylan Clark and Brian Williams of Dylan Clark Productions. It was also announced that Amy B. Harris would be acting as showrunner and executive producer. On December 19, 2020, Amazon Studios renewed the series for a second season. On July 28, 2022, Amazon canceled the series after two seasons.

=== Casting ===
On July 31, 2018, Mia Healey, Helena Howard, Reign Edwards, and Shannon Berry were cast as series regulars. On November 7, 2019, Rachel Griffiths, David Sullivan, Troy Winbush, Sophia Ali, Sarah Pidgeon, Jenna Clause, and Erana James joined the main cast. On May 3, 2021, Zack Calderon, Aidan Laprete, Nicholas Coombe, Charles Alexander, Miles Gutierrez-Riley, Reed Shannon, Tanner Ray Rook and Alex Fitzalan were cast in starring roles for the second season.

=== Filming ===
Filming for the first season began in October 2019 in New Zealand. Most of the outdoor scenes for the first season were filmed in Bethells Beach, New Zealand, with indoor studio scenes filmed at Studio West in West Auckland. Filming for the second season would relocate from New Zealand to Queensland, Australia and began filming in April 2021. Filming for the second season wrapped in August 2021.

== Release ==
The series's first season was released on December 11, 2020, on Amazon Prime Video. The second season was released on May 6, 2022.

== Reception ==
=== Critical response ===
On review aggregator Rotten Tomatoes, the first season received an approval rating of 93% based on 27 critic reviews, with an average rating of 7.4/10. The website's critics consensus reads, "An addictive thriller that also captures the complex lives of teenage girls, The Wilds is worth getting lost in." Metacritic gave the first season a weighted average score of 76 out of 100 based on 11 critic reviews, indicating "generally favorable reviews".

Kristen Baldwin of Entertainment Weekly gave the series a B+ and wrote, "Here, the mystery isn't so much why these girls are on the island as how being there will change them—and I, for one, want to go back." Richard Roeper of Chicago Sun-Times gave the series 3.5 out of 4 stars and said, "What's so impressive about The Wilds is how creator Sarah Streicher and the deeply talented young cast members immerse us in this world so quickly and create an almost instant interest and empathy for these eight teenage girls." The show has received praise from critics and advocacy groups for its diverse cast, which includes indigenous and queer characters, and its "front-and-center" depiction of same-sex relationships.

On Rotten Tomatoes, the second season holds an approval rating of 86% based on 28 critic reviews, with an average rating of 6.7/10. The website's critics consensus states, "The Wilds gets a little lost after expanding its ensemble at the expense of its original hook, but the core cast remains as watchable as ever." The second season received a score of 62 out of 100 on Metacritic based on 9 critics, indicating "generally favorable reviews".

=== Accolades ===
The Wilds was nominated for the Outstanding Drama Series category for the GLAAD Media Awards in 2021.
