= Jeremy Gardner (actor) =

American actor

- Citizenship: American
- Occupations: Horror movie director; actor
- Years active: 2012–present

Jeremy Gardner is an American horror film director and actor. He directed The Battery (2012) and After Midnight (2019), and starred in Sadistic Intentions (2018) and The Leech (2022).

Gardner grew up in the state of Florida. He stated that his style of making movies was influenced by Justin Benson and Aaron Moorhead. He directed The Battery on a small budget of $6,000, for which reason he shot the movie mostly in rural settings. About $4,000 was invested in traveling expenses and advertising.

He said that his work on Justin Benson and Aaron Moorhead's film Spring "was probably the first real set I was ever on".
