= Eric Pennycoff =

American film director

Eric Pennycoff is an American horror film director. He directed Sadistic Intentions (2018) and The Leech (2022).
