= Erana James =

New Zealand actress (born 1999)

- Born: February 17, 1999 (age 27); Whangārei, New Zealand
- Occupation: Actress
- Years active: 2013–present
- Known for: The Wilds

Erana James (born 17 February 1999) is a New Zealand actress of Māori descent. She is known for her roles as Toni Shalifoe in the Amazon Prime Video series The Wilds (2020–2022) and Curly in the FX series Alien: Earth (2025–present). Her iwi are Ngāti Whātua Ōrākei and Waikato-Tainui.

== Early life and education ==
James was born in Whangārei, New Zealand, where she grew up on a farm. She moved to Wellington at the age of ten and attended Wellington Girls' College. At fourteen she began studying acting at Rata Studios, a performing arts school in Wellington run by director Miranda Harcourt.

She later studied at Te Herenga Waka — Victoria University of Wellington, where she pursued a Bachelor of Arts in Te Reo Māori alongside sociology. She has spoken about her choice to study the language, saying the preservation of Te Reo Māori is important to her as a Māori woman. She now lives in Melbourne, Australia.

== Career ==
James made an uncredited appearance in Peter Jackson's The Hobbit: The Desolation of Smaug in 2013 while still at school. Her first significant role came in 2017 when, while still in high school, she was cast as the lead in the New Zealand fantasy film The Changeover, directed by Miranda Harcourt and Stuart McKenzie and based on the 1984 novel by Margaret Mahy. Harcourt had first encountered James through her acting programme at Rata Studios. The film also starred Timothy Spall, Lucy Lawless, Melanie Lynskey, and Nicholas Galitzine.

Also in 2017, James appeared in the New Zealand children's comedy web series Lucy Lewis Can't Lose and in the Stan series Golden Boy (2019).

James gained international recognition in 2020 with the role of Toni Shalifoe, a fierce and guarded young woman, in the Amazon Prime Video survival drama The Wilds, created by Sarah Streicher. The series, which follows a group of teenage girls stranded on a desert island, ran for two seasons before being cancelled in 2022. In a 2021 interview, she described filming the show in New Zealand as an "amazing" experience, noting that being surrounded by familiar people helped her navigate her first major American production.

In 2023, she appeared in the Australian drama series Bad Behaviour and the New Zealand film Uproar, the latter alongside Julian Dennison.

In 2024, James starred as Nellie in We Were Dangerous, the debut feature film of director Josephine Stewart-Te Whiu, which had its world premiere in the Narrative Feature Competition at the 2024 South by Southwest Film & TV Festival. Set in 1950s New Zealand, the film follows three young women at a reform school for girls. The film also lists Taika Waititi among its producers. Collider called it a "funny and frightening coming-of-age tale" led by James.

In 2025, James joined the main cast of the FX science fiction series Alien: Earth, created by Noah Hawley and set in the Alien universe, playing Curly — a synthetic human who is part of a group of child consciousnesses placed in adult bodies by a fictional corporation. The series premiered on 12 August 2025 and was renewed for a second season, with production scheduled to begin in London in 2026. Also in 2025, she appeared in two music videos for Australian musician Vance Joy, Divine Feelings and Fascination in the Dark.

== Filmography ==
=== Film ===
Year	Title	Role	Notes
2013	The Hobbit: The Desolation of Smaug	Lake-towner	Uncredited
2017	The Changeover	Laura Chant	Based on the 1984 novel by Margaret Mahy
2017	Southland's Home	Nell	Short film; main role
2020	Hot Mother	Sofia	Short film
2023	Uproar	Samantha	
2024	We Were Dangerous	Nellie	World premiere, SXSW 2024

=== Television ===
Year	Title	Role	Notes
2015	Sons of Liars	Bria	Main role
2017	Lucy Lewis Can't Lose	J'ess	Recurring role
2019	My Life Is Murder	Juliana Lloyd	Episodic role
2019	Golden Boy	Kahu	Main role, season 1
2019	Playing for Keeps	Samira	Recurring role
2020–2022	The Wilds	Toni Shalifoe	Main role
2023	Bad Behaviour	Ronnie	Recurring role
2025–present	Alien: Earth	Curly	Main role

=== Music videos ===
Year	Title	Artist
2025	"Divine Feelings"	Vance Joy
2025	"Fascination in the Dark"	Vance Joy
