= Sarah Streicher =

American screenwriter and playwright

- Born: Toledo, Ohio, United States
- Education: Stanford University (MA, French Literature); University of Southern California (MFA, Screenwriting)
- Occupations: Screenwriter, playwright, producer
- Years active: 2015–present
- Known for: The Wilds; Turning Red; Daredevil

Sarah Margaret Streicher is an American screenwriter, playwright, and producer. She is known as the creator, writer, and executive producer of the Amazon Prime Video drama series The Wilds (2020–2022). Her other credits include co-writing the Pixar animated feature film Turning Red (2022).

== Early life and education ==
She grew up in Toledo, Ohio. She graduated as valedictorian from the University of Notre Dame in 2004 with a degree in English and French, later pursued graduate studies, earning an MA in French Literature from Stanford University and an MFA in Screenwriting from the University of Southern California. From an early age, she hoped to become a writer, viewing the pen as her path to self-expression.

== Career ==
=== Early career ===
Streicher began her television writing career as a staff writer on the third season of the Netflix superhero drama Daredevil (2018), based on the Marvel Comics character. Alongside her television work, she also contributed to the screenplay of the Pixar animated feature Turning Red (2022), directed by Domee Shi (Shi's feature directorial debut following her Academy Award-winning short film Bao.)

=== The Wilds (2020–2022) ===
She is the creator, writer and executive producer of The Wilds, a drama series following a group of teenage girls stranded on a deserted island after a plane crash, who discover their ordeal is an elaborate social experiment. She pitched the concept to Amazon Studios, where it received a pilot order in June 2018 becoming the first ABC Signature Studios series produced for Amazon. It was greenlit in May 2019, with showrunner Amy B. Harris, and executive producers Jamie Tarses and Dylan Clark. Susanna Fogel directed and executive produced the pilot. The series was the first young adult series to premiere on Prime Video and the first to be renewed for a second season, part of an initiative launched by Amazon Studios president Jennifer Salke to expand into the YA genre.

She described the series as growing from her belief that coming of age requires as much grit and fire as surviving on a deserted island."

The series premiered on 11 December 2020, to positive reviews, earning a 93% approval rating on Rotten Tomatoes for its first season. Richard Roeper of the Chicago Sun-Times wrote that Streicher and the cast had created "an almost instant interest and empathy" for the characters. The series received particular praise for its representation of queer characters and its depiction of same-sex relationships, earning a nomination for Outstanding Drama Series at the 2021 GLAAD Media Awards. Streicher has said the storylines were shaped by LGBTQ+ writers in the writers' room, describing the story as "enriched" by their contributions.

A second season premiered on 6 May 2022, expanding the story to include a male control group. Amazon cancelled the series in July 2022 after two seasons, though she initially pitched Amazon a four-season arc for the show.

== Filmography ==
=== Film ===
Year	Title	Role	Notes
2022	Turning Red	Screenwriter	Pixar; directed by Domee Shi

=== Television ===
Year	Title	Role	Notes
2018	Daredevil	Staff writer	Season 3; Netflix/Marvel Television
2020–2022	The Wilds	Creator, writer, executive producer	Amazon Prime Video; 2 seasons
