= Xander Robin =

American film director

Xander Robin is an American filmmaker. He directed Are We Not Cats (2016), three episodes of Chillin Island (2021), and The Python Hunt (2025).

== Early life ==
Robin grew up in South Florida, and studied film at Florida State University.
