= Lauren LaVera =

American actress

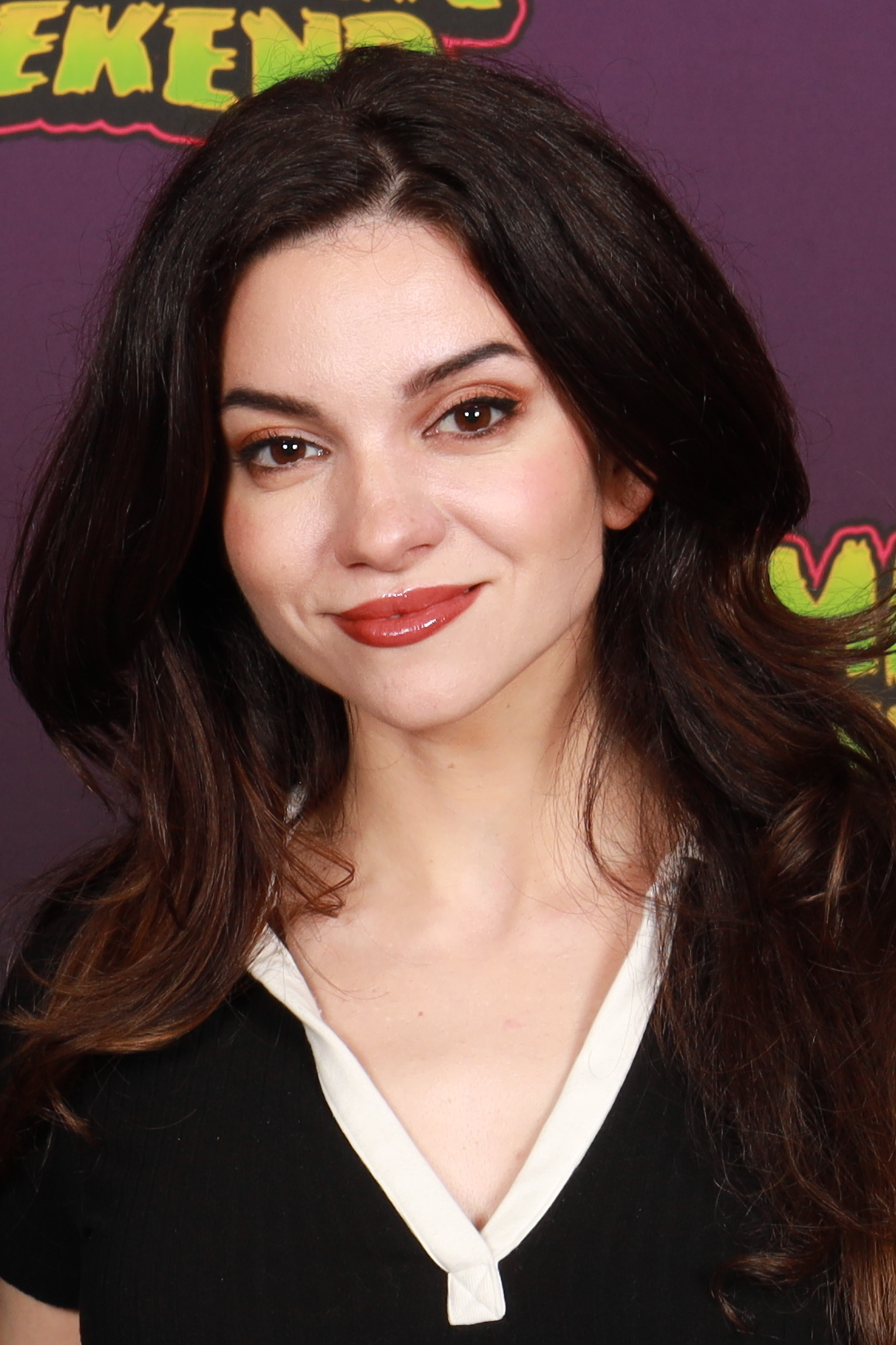
- LaVera in 2024
- Born: June 14; Philadelphia, Pennsylvania, U.S.
- Occupations: Actress; stunt performer
- Years active: 2016–present
- Website: laurenlavera.com

Lauren LaVera is an American actress and stunt performer. She is known for playing final girl Sienna Shaw in the horror film franchise Terrifier (2022–2026), which established her as a scream queen and has collectively grossed over $100 million.

LaVera began her career as a body double, notably working with Anya Taylor-Joy in the psychological thriller film Split (2016). Outside of the Terrifier films, she has starred in several short films and the horror film Twisted (2026).

== Early life ==
LaVera was born in Philadelphia, Pennsylvania. As a child, she was interested in acting and began training in it while attending Temple University; however, it was not her main focus. She initially sought to pursue a Juris Doctor degree but switched to a major in English and a minor in Italian before dropping out to work as an optician. LaVera decided to pursue acting as a full-time career following the death of her grandmother, an aspiring dancer and actress in her youth who was unable to pursue her aspirations. The same day she quit her job as an optician, LaVera began taking acting classes.

== Career ==
One of LaVera's first experiences on a film set was working as a body double for Anya Taylor-Joy, Haley Lu Richardson, and Jessica Sula in M. Night Shyamalan's psychological thriller Split (2016). LaVera worked closely with Shyamalan on the set and her positive experience led to her wanting to become a full-time actress. In 2017, LaVera had a supporting role in Emanuele Della Valle's thriller Wetlands (2017).

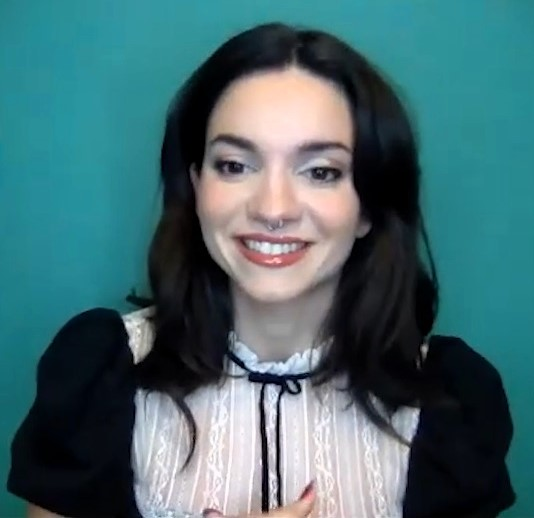
LaVera in 2022

LaVera auditioned for the role of Sienna Shaw in Damien Leone's slasher film Terrifier 2 (2022) in 2019. During her auditions, she hadn't seen the first Terrifier (2016) and didn't watch it as she didn't want the film to influence her decision-making during her audition process. LaVera got cast as Sienna which would become her breakthrough role, becoming a co-lead of the Terrifier film franchise opposite David Howard Thornton as Art the Clown and Samantha Scaffidi as Victoria Heyes. Leone considered no other actress for the part. LaVera's performance was met with positive reviews. IGN's review said that LaVera "rules as Sienna in her angel-winged fantasy armor as a final girl fighting for family, facing her demons, and screaming bloody war cries in Art's mocking face," while Matthew Jackson of Paste wrote that "LaVera, tasked with injecting humanity into the sequel, lives up to this task with pure star power."

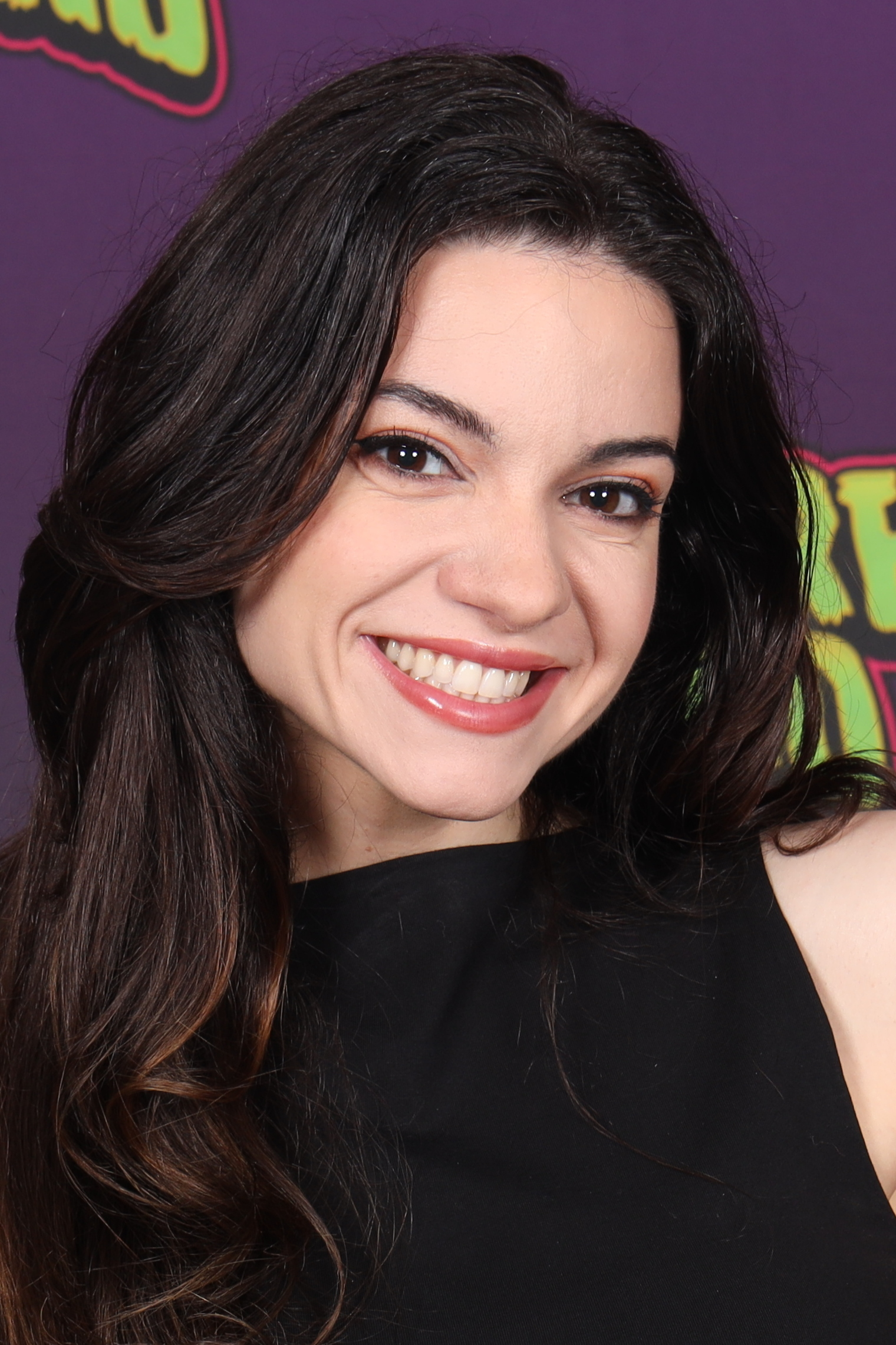
LaVera at the Nightmare Weekend Miami 2024

LaVera appeared in the mob film Not for Nothing, released in October 2022. In December 2022, LaVera was cast as Alessa, a pregnant woman whose antagonizing father disapproves of her relationship with her husband, in Joe Lam's 2023 horror film The Fetus, opposite Julian Curtis and Bill Moseley. In February 2023, Bloody Disgusting reported that LaVera would star as Lisa Gray in the supernatural thriller film The Well, directed by Federico Zampaglione. She presented the film at its U.K. premiere at FrightFest in 2024. In 2023, LaVera appeared as a guest judge on the fifth season of Shudder's reality competition series The Boulet Brothers' Dragula. In 2024, Lavera portrayed Heidi Morris in two episodes of NBC's Law & Order: Organized Crime: "Missing Persons" and "Beyond the Sea".

LaVera reprised her role as Sienna in Leone's Christmas horror film Terrifier 3 (2024), which debuted at number one at the United States box office with over $18 million, becoming the most profitable film in the franchise. Critics praised her performance for her portrayal of trauma and survivor guilt. She had a cameo Italian voice-over role in Mike Flanagan's drama film The Life of Chuck (2024), based on the 2020 novella by Stephen King. Following her performances in the Terrifier films, LaVera recalled being offered roles that she felt were too similar to her character, Sienna, and turning them down. In 2025, LaVera portrayed the con artist Paloma in Darren Lynn Bousman’s horror thriller film Twisted (2026). LaVera stated that she enjoyed portraying a character who assumes multiple personas and one who is “morally grey.”

In June of 2026, it was announced LaVera would star opposite Rory Culkin in Red Wedding, a new horror-thriller film.

== Personal life ==
LaVera married her husband in 2014. They met while she was traveling in Europe. In 2021, she announced that they had bought their first house.

LaVera is proficient in Taekwondo, Kun Khmer and Wushu.

== Filmography ==
=== Film ===
Year	Title	Role	Notes	Ref.
2017	Wetlands	"Buttercup" / Pusher		
2017	Candy	Candy 'Teresa Garcia'	Short film	
2019	Clinton Road	Kayla		
2019	Ms. Barton's Famous Cakes	Ms. Barton	Short film	
2019	The Date	—N/a	Short film	
2021	Stalked	Steph	Short film	
2021	Night of the Devil		Short film	
2022	Terrifier 2	Sienna Shaw		
2022	Not For Nothing	Kelly		
2024	The Well	Lisa Gray		
2024	Terrifier 3	Sienna Shaw		
2024	The Life of Chuck	Italian reporter	Voice	
2025	The Fetus	Alessa		
2026	Twisted	Paloma Joia		
TBA	Terrifier 4	Sienna Shaw		

=== Television ===
Year	Title	Role	Notes
2017	Iron Fist	Ciara	Episode: "Black Tiger Steals Heart"
2020	MacGyver	Player	Episode: "Soccer + Desi + Merchant + Titan"
2020	Dispatches from Elsewhere	Barista	Episodes: "Peter", "The Boy"
2020	A Taste of Christmas	Ariella Cancio	Television film
2023	The Boulet Brothers' Dragula	Herself	Season five, episode 6
2024	Law & Order: Organized Crime	Heidi Morris	Episodes: "Beyond the Sea", "Original Sin"

=== Video games ===
Year	Title	Role	Note
2026	Dead by Daylight	Sienna Shaw	Playable character; voice and likeness

== Accolades ==
Year	Award	Category	Nominated work	Result	Reference
2023	Fangoria Chainsaw Awards	The Editor's Eyeball Award	Terrifier 2	Won	
