= List of horror films of 2016 =

This is a list of horror films that were released in 2016.

== Highest-grossing horror films of 2016 ==
Highest-grossing horror films of 2016
Rank	Title	Distributor	Worldwide gross
1	The Conjuring 2	Warner Bros. Pictures	$321.8 million
2	Resident Evil: The Final Chapter	Sony Pictures Releasing	$312.2 million
3	Split	Universal Pictures	$278.3 million
4	Don't Breathe	Sony Pictures Releasing	$157.8 million
5	Lights Out	Warner Bros. Pictures	$148.9 million
6	The Shallows	Sony Pictures Releasing	$119.1 million
7	The Purge: Election Year	Universal Pictures	$118.6 million
8	10 Cloverfield Lane	Paramount Pictures	$110.2 million
9	Train to Busan	Next Entertainment World	$98.5 million
10	Ouija: Origin of Evil	Universal Pictures	$81.7 million

== Horror films released in 2016 ==
Horror films released in 2016
Title	Director	Cast	Country	Subgenre/Notes
10 Cloverfield Lane	Dan Trachtenberg	Mary Elizabeth Winstead, John Goodman, John Gallagher Jr.	United States	
The Amityville Legacy	Dustin Ferguson, Mike Johnson	Mark Popejoy, Julia Farrell, Jennii Caroline	United States	
Amityville: No Escape	Henrique Couto	Julia Gomez, Josh Miller, Allison Egan	United States	
The Amityville Terror	Michael Angelo	Nicole Tompkins, Kaiwi Lyman, Kim Nielsen	United States	
Antibirth	Danny Perez	Natasha Lyonne, Chloë Sevigny, Meg Tilly	United States; Canada	
The Autopsy of Jane Doe	André Øvredal	Brian Cox, Emile Hirsch, Ophelia Lovibond	United States	
Bedeviled	The Vang Brothers	Saxon Sharbino, Mitchell Edwards, Carson Boatman	United States	
The Belko Experiment	Greg McLean	John Gallagher Jr., Tony Goldwyn, David Del Rio	United States	
Blair Witch	Adam Wingard	James Allen McCune, Callie Hernandez, Valorie Curry	United States	
Blood of the Tribades	Sophia Cacciola, Michael J. Epstein	Chloé Cunha, Mary Widow, Seth Chatfield	United States	
The Boy	William Brent Bell	Lauren Cohan, Rupert Evans, Jim Norton	United States	
The Blackout Experiments	Rich Fox	Josh Randall, Kristjan Thor, Bob Glouberman	United States	
Bleed	Tripp Rhame	Chelsey Crisp, Riley Smith, Michael Steger	United States	
Cabin Fever	Travis Zariwny	Gage Golightly, Matthew Daddario, Nadine Crocker	United States	
Cell	Tod Williams	John Cusack, Samuel L. Jackson, Isabelle Fuhrman	United States	
The Conjuring 2	James Wan	Vera Farmiga, Patrick Wilson, Frances O'Connor	United States	
The Darkness	Greg McLean	Kevin Bacon, Radha Mitchell, Tina Lifford	United States	
Dead 7	Danny Roew	AJ McLean	United States	
The Devil's Dolls	Padraig Reynolds	Christopher Wiehl, Kym Jackson	United States	
Don't Breathe	Fede Álvarez	Jane Levy, Dylan Minnette, Stephen Lang	United States	
Don't Hang Up	Alexis Wajsbrot, Damien Macé	Laurie Cook, Jason Newmark, Romain Philippe	United Kingdom	
Don't Kill It	Mike Mendez	Dolph Lundgren, Kristina Klebe, Tony Bentley	United States	Horror comedy
The Eyes of My Mother	Nicolas Pesce	Diana Agostini, Olivia Bond, Will Brill	United States	
The Faith of Anna Waters	Kelvin Tong	Elizabeth Rice, Matthew Settle	Singapore; United States	
Fender Bender	Mark Pavia	Makenzie Vega, Cassidy Freeman, Bill Sage, Steven Michael Quezada	United States	
The Forest	Jason Zada	Natalie Dormer, Taylor Kinney	United States	
Haunting on Fraternity Row	Brant Sersen	Jacob Artist, Jayson Blair, Shanley Caswell	United States	
Holidays	Various		United States	
Home	Frank Lin	Heather Langenkamp, Samantha Mumba, Aaron Hill	United States	
Hush	Mike Flanagan	John Gallagher, Jr., Michael Trucco, Kate Siegel	United States	
I Am the Pretty Thing That Lives in the House	Osgood Perkins	Ruth Wilson, Bob Balaban, Lucy Boynton	United States; Canada	
Killing Ground	Damien Power	Harriet Dyer, Ian Meadows, Aaron Pedersen	Australia	
Krampus Unleashed	Robert Conway	Amelia Brantley, Bryson Holl, Caroline Lassetter	United States	
Lights Out	David F. Sandberg	Teresa Palmer, Gabriel Bateman, Maria Bello	United States	
Terrifier	Damien Leone	David Howard Thornton, Jenna Kanell, Samantha Scaffidi, Catherine Corcoran	United States	Slasher
The Limehouse Golem	Juan Carlos Medina	Olivia Cooke, Bill Nighy, Douglas Booth	United Kingdom	
The Love Witch	Anna Biller	Samantha Robinson, Jeffrey Vincent Parise, Gian Keys, Laura Waddell	United States	
Martyrs	Kevin Goetz, Michael Goetz	Troian Bellisario, Bailey Noble, Kate Burton	United States	
The Midnight Man	Travis Zariwny	Lin Shaye, Gabrielle Haugh, Grayson Gabriel	United States	
The Monster	Bryan Bertino	Zoe Kazan, Ella Ballentine	United States	
Morgan	Luke Scott	Kate Mara, Anya Taylor-Joy, Toby Jones	United States	
The Neon Demon	Nicolas Winding Refn	Elle Fanning, Jena Malone, Abbey Lee	Denmark; France; United States	
The Other Side of the Door	Johannes Roberts	Sarah Wayne Callies, Jeremy Sisto	India; United Kingdom	
Ouija: Origin of Evil	Mike Flanagan	Annalise Basso, Elizabeth Reaser, Lulu Wilson	United States	
Phantasm: Ravager	David Hartman	Reggie Bannister, Dawn Cody, Angus Scrimm	United States	
Pool Party Massacre	Drew Marvick	LeeAnna Vamp, Mark Justice, Alexis Adams	United States	
Pride and Prejudice and Zombies	Burr Steers	Lily James, Sam Riley, Jack Huston	United States	
The Purge: Election Year	James DeMonaco	Frank Grillo, Elizabeth Mitchell	United States	
Raw	Julia Ducournau	Garance Marillier, Ella Rumpf, Rabah Naït Oufella	France; Belgium	
Resident Evil: The Final Chapter	Paul W. S. Anderson	Milla Jovovich, Iain Glen, Ali Larter	United States	
Sadako vs. Kayako	Koji Shiraishi	Mizuki Yamamoto, Tina Tamashiro	Japan	
Siren	Gregg Bishop	Chase Williamson, Justin Welborn, Michael Aaron Milligan	United States	
Split	M. Night Shyamalan	James McAvoy, Anya Taylor-Joy, Bruce Willis	United States	
Spring Break Zombie Massacre	Bobby Carnevale	Sam Suchmann, Mattie Zufelt, Pauly D	United States	
Sweet, Sweet Lonely Girl	A.D. Calvo	Erin Wilhelmi, Quinn Shephard, Susan Kellermann	United States	
Train to Busan	Yeon Sang-ho	Gong Yoo, Ma Dong-seok, Ahn So-hee	South Korea	
Under the Shadow	Babak Anvari	Narges Rashidi, Avin Manshadi, Bobby Naderi	Iran; Jordan; Qatar; United Kingdom	
The Veil	Phil Joanou	Jessica Alba, Thomas Jane, Lily Rabe	United States	
The Void	Steven Kostanski, Jeremy Gillespie	Ellen Wong, Aaron Poole, Evan Stern	Canada	
Volumes of Blood: Horror Stories	[various directors]		United States	
The Wailing	Na Hong-jin	Kwak Do-won, Hwang Jung-min, Chun Woo-hee	South Korea	
What We Become	Bo Mikkelson	Troels Lyby, Mille Dinesen, Mikael Birkkjær	Denmark	
We Are the Flesh	Emiliano Rocha Minter	Noé Hernández, María Evoli, Diego Gamaliel	Mexico; France	
The Windmill Massacre	Nick Jongerius	Charlotte Beaumont, Bart Klever, Patrick Baladi, Ben Batt Fiona Hampton, Tanroh Ishida, Adam Thomas Wright, Noah Taylor	Netherlands	
Without Name	Lorcan Finnegan	Alan McKenna, Niamh Algar, James Browne	Ireland	
