= The Missing Girl =

The Missing Girl may refer to:

- The Missing Girl (film), a 2015 American film
- "The Missing Girl" (Celebrity Deathmatch), an episode of Celebrity Deathmatch
