= The Beniker Gang =

1984 film by Ken Kwapis

- Theatrical release poster
- Directed by: Ken Kwapis
- Screenplay by: Jeffrey Kindley
- Based on: Dear Lola by Judie Angell
- Produced by: Doro Bachrach
- Starring: Andrew McCarthy; Jennifer Dundas; Charles Fields; Jeff Alan-Lee; Danny Pintauro
- Cinematography: Curtis Clark
- Edited by: Stan Warnow
- Music by: Richard Lyon
- Production company: Scholastic Productions
- Distributed by: Lorimar Pictures
- Release date: November 2, 1984
- Running time: 87 minutes
- Country: United States
- Language: English

The Beniker Gang is a 1984 American drama film written by Jeffrey Kindley and directed by Ken Kwapis (in his feature film directorial debut). The film stars Andrew McCarthy as Arthur Beniker, Jennifer Dundas as Cassie Beniker, Charles Fields as Edmund Beniker, and Danny Pintauro as Ben Beniker.

== Plot ==
Five orphans run away from an orphanage in hopes of becoming a family together.

== Cast ==
- Andrew McCarthy as Arthur Beniker
- Jennifer Dundas as Cassie Beniker
- Charles Fields as Edmund Beniker
- Jeff Alan-Lee as James Beniker
- Danny Pintauro as Ben Beniker
- George Martin as Judge Pink
- Will Patton as Forest Ranger
- J. T. Walsh as Principal Stoddard
- Mary Hamill as Edith Stamwick
- William Duell as Postmaster Greaves
- Anthony Heald as Mr. Uldrich
- Richmond Hoxie as Attorney
- Peter McRobbie as Mr. Millhauser
- Paddy Croft as Mrs. O'Malley
- Joyce Reehling as Miss Nickerson
- Martha Byrne as Molly Stamwick
- Stacey Glick as Orie Stamwick
- Bill Smitrovich as Laundry Truck Driver
