= Swimming (film) =

- DVD cover.
- Directed by: Robert J. Siegel
- Written by: Lisa Bazadona; Robert J. Siegel; Grace Woodard
- Produced by: Linda Moran
- Starring: Lauren Ambrose; Jennifer Dundas; Joelle Carter
- Cinematography: John Leuba
- Music by: Mark White
- Production company: Oceanside Pictures
- Distributed by: Oceanside Pictures (United States); Showcase Entertainment (Worldwide)
- Release dates: January 2000 (Slamdance Film Festival); April 5, 2002 (United States)
- Running time: 90 minutes
- Country: United States
- Language: English

Swimming is a 2000 coming-of-age drama film directed by Robert J. Siegel and starring Lauren Ambrose, Jennifer Dundas, and Joelle Carter. The film chronicles a summer in the life of Frankie, a teenager on South Carolina's Myrtle Beach.

The film premiered at the Slamdance Film Festival in January 2000 and went on to play a variety of film festivals, including the Karlovy Vary International Film Festival and the Chicago International Film Festival. At Outfest Los Angeles, Ambrose won the award for Outstanding Actress in a Feature Film.

== Plot ==
On Myrtle Beach, Frankie works at her family's burger stand run by her older brother Neil. During her off hours, she hangs out with her best friend Nicola, who runs a nearby piercing stand. The dynamic between the girls shifts when her brother hires a new girl named Josee to work at the restaurant. Though Josee is thought to be dating the local lifeguard, she expresses interest in Frankie. Frankie also meets a quirky drifter, Heath, while Nicola gets to know Kalani, a Marine from Hawaii. As Frankie starts to spend more time with Josee, Nicola tells Frankie the upsetting news that Josee is cheating with Neil, who is married and has a young family.

== Cast ==
- Lauren Ambrose as Francine "Frankie" Wheeler
- Jennifer Dundas as Nicola Jenrette
- Joelle Carter as Josee
- Josh Pais as Neil Wheeler
- Sharon Scruggs as Marianne Wheeler
- Jamie Harrold as Heath
- Joshua Harto as Lance
- Anthony Ruivivar as Kalani
- James Villemaire as Brad

== Production ==
Lauren Ambrose was cast well before the HBO series Six Feet Under took off in critical acclaim.

Director Robert J. Siegel said, "The best part about making this movie was that we were under no obligation whatsoever to anyone. This movie is what I call fiercely independent. It's got a very European feel to it - Eric Rohmer was one of my muses when making it."

Principal photography took place over 28 days from October to November 1998.

== Release ==
The film debuted at the 2000 Slamdance Film Festival. In November 2000, the film secured a distribution deal and was given a limited release on April 5, 2002.

== Critical reception ==
Roger Ebert of the Chicago Sun-Times praised the film, writing Ambrose is "an actress whose face projects that woman's doubts and yearning." He added, "Swimming could unfold as a sitcom, or as a desperately sincere drama, but director Robert J. Siegel and his co-writers, Liza Bazadona and Grace Woodard, go for something more delicate and subtle. They use Ambrose's ability to watch and think and not commit, and they allow the summer's choices and possibilities to unfold within her as if her sexuality is awakening for the first time." Ed Gonzales of Slant Magazine wrote the film "is that rare coming-of-age tale that doesn’t scream Afterschool Special."

On review aggregate website Rotten Tomatoes, Swimming has a 74% approval rating based on 39 reviews. The critics consensus reads, "A refreshingly low-key coming-of-age story."

=== Accolades ===
- Outfest Los Angeles
  - Outstanding Actress in a Feature Film - Lauren Ambrose (winner)
- Woodstock Film Festival
  - Robert J. Siegel (winner)
