= Off the Map (film) =

- Theatrical release poster
- Directed by: Campbell Scott
- Written by: Joan Ackermann
- Based on: Off the Map by Joan Ackermann
- Produced by: Paul E. Cohen
- Starring: Joan Allen; Valentina de Angelis; Sam Elliott; J.K. Simmons
- Cinematography: Juan Ruiz Anchía
- Edited by: Andy Keir
- Music by: Gary DeMichele
- Production company: Holedigger Films
- Distributed by: Manhattan Pictures
- Release dates: January 22, 2003 (Sundance); March 11, 2005 (limited)
- Running time: 108 minutes
- Country: United States
- Language: English
- Box office: $1,319,492

Off the Map is a 2003 drama film directed by Campbell Scott. The screenplay was written by Joan Ackermann, based on her play of the same title. It premiered at the 2003 Sundance Film Festival but did not receive a theatrical release until March 11, 2005.

== Plot ==
In the summer of 1974, the eccentric Groden family lives an off-the-grid existence in rural New Mexico. Daughter Bo uses her imagination and creativity to explore the world around her, while her mother Arlene holds the family together. Her father Charley, however, has fallen into a deep depression. One day an IRS auditor named William Gibbs arrives to determine why the Grodens haven't filed their income tax for so long and is suspicious of their ability to live with so little. While there, William falls into a fever and later awakens a changed man who sticks around on their property.

== Cast ==
- Joan Allen as Arlene Groden
- Valentina de Angelis as young Bo Groden
  - Amy Brenneman as adult Bo
- Sam Elliott as Charley Groden
- J.K. Simmons as George
- Jim True-Frost as William Gibbs
- Boots Southern as Rusty
- J.D. Garfield as Romero
- Matthew Montoya as Store Clerk
- Kathy Griego as Consuela
- Fr. William Hart McNicholas as Interpreter
- Fr. Timothy Martinez as Priest
- J.D. Hawkins as Jack
- Kevin Skousen as Don

== Production ==
Joan Allen told Campbell Scott that she didn't think she'd be able to do her nude scene. He set her up with a body double but Allen changed her mind and ended up doing the scene herself.

== Reception ==
On review aggregator website Rotten Tomatoes, Off the Map has an approval rating of 70% based on 90 reviews. The site’s critics consensus reads, "Excellent performances mark this leisurely paced film."

Roger Ebert gave the film three and 1/2 stars out of four and praised the acting, particularly that of Joan Allen. Of Allen, he said her performance is one of "astonishing complexity. Here is a woman whose life includes acceptance of what she cannot change, sufficiency within her own skin and such simple pleasures as gardening in the nude. She is a good wife and a good mother, but not obviously; it takes us the whole movie to fully appreciate how profoundly she observes her husband and daughter, and provides what they need in ways that are below their radar." He also praised Campbell Scott’s direction and Joan Ackermann’s script, saying they managed to avoid turning the characters into caricatures.

Critics also praised the cinematography by Juan Ruiz Anchía. Ann Hornaday of The Washington Post wrote "every frame of this lushly beautiful film reflects the potent, almost mystical, effect the region's plateaus, canyons and deserts have on their human inhabitants" and called the film "a ravishing ode to the frontier spirit."

== Awards and nominations ==
- Golden Trailer Awards, 2005, nominated for Golden Trailer
- Sarasota Film Festival, 2004, won Audience Award
- Taos Talking Pictures Film Festival, 2003, won Taos Land Grant Award
