= Street Kings 2: Motor City =

2011 film by Chris Fisher

- DVD cover
- Directed by: Chris Fisher
- Written by: Ed Gonzales; Jeremy Haft
- Produced by: Ash R. Shah
- Starring: Ray Liotta; Shawn Hatosy; Scott Norman; Clifton Powell
- Cinematography: Marvin V. Rush
- Edited by: Miklos Wright
- Music by: Jon Sadoff
- Production company: Silver Nitrate
- Distributed by: 20th Century Fox Home Entertainment
- Release date: April 19, 2011
- Running time: 92 minutes
- Country: United States
- Language: English

Street Kings 2: Motor City is a 2011 American action thriller film starring Ray Liotta and directed by Chris Fisher. It is a stand-alone sequel to the 2008 film Street Kings starring Keanu Reeves. The film was released direct-to-DVD in the United States on April 19, 2011.

The film takes place in Detroit rather than Los Angeles and only Clifton Powell comes back, albeit this time with the rank of Detective Tyrone Fowler rather than Sergeant Green. However, it deals with similar themes of police corruption and internal affairs investigations that were seen in the first film.

== Plot ==
Marty Kingston is a veteran detective that works in Narcotic Division alongside his partner Sal Quintana and two other friends, Tyrone Fowler and Jimmy Rogan. Their unit takes down a neo-nazi biker gang called The White Alliance. They then split over a million dollars of drug money up four ways. Sometime later on it is shown that Quintana has become a corrupt cop who regularly extorts a local strip club on the pretext of "protection". One night, while collecting his fee, Quintana is suddenly ambushed and killed by a hooded assassin.

The day after his funeral, Marty's superior Lieutenant Walker assigned him with a new partner Dan Sullivan to investigate Quintana's murder and to get his killer, dead or alive. They go to the strip club he regularly visited and extorted, and learned from the owner that he used to collect money with his friend whom he describes as "big, black, and scary". Sullivan correctly deduces that Fowler was Quintana's friend. He goes to Fowler to ask some questions, but both Fowler and Rogan refuse to cooperate and ominously tell him to leave them alone. Later that night, when Fowler visits a brothel, he's killed by the same assassin who later goes to Rogan's yacht to kill him too. But Rogan easily overpowers him and during their struggle, unmasks the assassin and is shocked that it was Kingston before he, taking advantage of his confusion, turned things around and killed Fowler instead.

The next day, Sullivan got a recording from CCTV at the harbor and watched it along with Kingston, but couldn't see his face clearly due to the stain of seagull poo. Kingston decides to destroy the recording, pretending to give it to the forensic lab. Later that afternoon, he goes to the abandoned barn to pick up the drug dealer Trevon 'Bones' Richardson who was tied to the chair. He took his DNA sample in order to frame him for the murders, but Bones escapes when he tried to kill him at the harbor. Nevertheless, the police thought it was Bones who killed them all and ambushed his hideout along with a SWAT team. Bones tries to escape but is followed by Sullivan. After a long chase, they ended up at the tram where Bones takes a woman as a hostage. When Sullivan accuses him of the murders, he denies it, telling him that he's being framed and held up in a place that "smells like garlic". He proceeds to attack Sullivan, who in return shoots him dead.

While the police celebrate Sullivan's success, he still has doubts because he feels something was off. During an interview with Rogan's wife, she confesses that her husband was a part of an undercover cop group who was assigned to bring down the White Alliance, a white supremacist biker gang that works as a drug dealer in Detroit. She also said that Kingston, Fowler, and Quintana were undercover as well. Sullivan visits the prison where the gang leader is being held, and he told him that when they were arrested, their money that was worth two hundred million dollars mysteriously disappeared. And at a Sullivan and Kingston family gathering, Kingston's son indirectly mentioned a place that smells like garlic, similar to what Bones said. Sullivan goes to the barn house and discovered Bones' torn fabric cloth. Realizing that Sullivan's onto him, Kingston confesses that he murdered all of his partners because they refused to help his wife who was pregnant with their child with the money they robbed from the gang out of greed. He warns Sullivan to drop his investigation for the sake of their families. Faced with a dilemma, Sullivan consults his pregnant wife Leila, who encourages him to expose his partner's crimes.

When Kingston gets called by Parker to have a word with Internal Affairs with Sullivan, he attempts to kill him by planting a bomb in his car, but it killed Leila instead when she decided to use Sullivan's car. Devastated, Sullivan goes to Kingston's house to kill him, but he was subdued by Kingston, who takes him to the barn to be killed. But Sullivan manages to escape and hides in the barn. After a long cat-and-mouse game, Sullivan subdued Kingston. Kingston begs for his life from Sullivan, telling him he didn't mean to kill his wife, and admits that Sullivan is better than he was. Sullivan was about to relent but decides to shoot him anyway and says, “No, I’m not.” Sullivan steps outside to the growing sound of police sirens as the movie ends.

== Cast ==
- Ray Liotta as Detective Marty Kingston
- Shawn Hatosy as Detective Dan Sullivan
- Scott Norman as Detective Sal "Q" Quintana
- Clifton Powell as Detective Tyrone Fowler
- Kevin Chapman as Detective Jimmy Rogan
- Inbar Lavi as Leila Sullivan
- Charlotte Ross as Beth Kingston
- Stephanie Cotton as Sonyia Rogan
- Linda Boston as Lieutenant Walker
- Corey Emanuel Wilson as Trevon "Bones" Richardson
- Jack Moore as Sergeant Harrison Clark
- Tiren Jhames as Lloyd Shunt
- Tim Holmes as Mikey
- Ele Bardha as Sergeant Tomic
- Noli McCool as Albert Wichelli (uncredited)

== Production ==
It is set in Detroit, Michigan, where it was filmed in 49 days, from May 20 to July 8, 2010.

== Home media ==
The DVD was released in Region 1 in the United States on April 19, 2011, and Region 2 in the United Kingdom on 3 October 2011. It was distributed by 20th Century Fox Home Entertainment.
