= Joseph Bau =

Polish and Israeli graphic artist and poet (1920–2002)

- יוסף באו
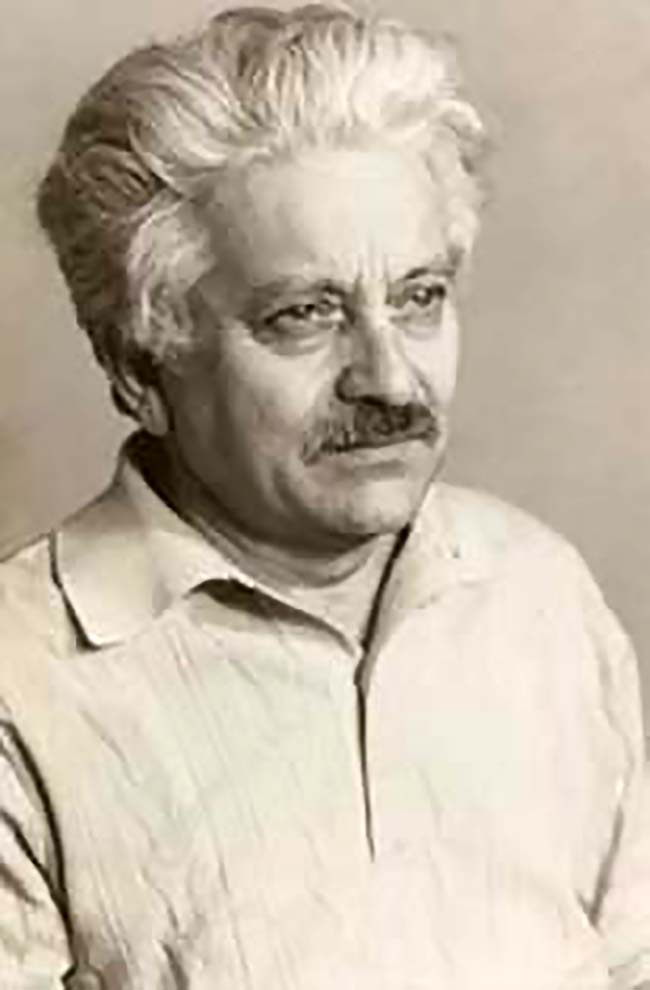
- Joseph Bau
- Born: 18 June 1920; Kraków, Poland
- Died: 24 May 2002 (aged 81); Tel Aviv, Israel
- Education: Jan Matejko Academy of Fine Arts; University of Plastic Arts
- Spouse: Rebecca Tennenbaum (m. 1943; died 1997)
- Children: 2

Joseph Bau (Hebrew: יוסף באו; 18 June 1920 – 24 May 2002) was a Polish-born Israeli artist, animator, and writer. A survivor of The Holocaust, Bau was sent to Brünnlitz labor camp operated by Oskar Schindler. The wedding between him and his wife Rebecca Tennenbaum, secretly conducted in the Kraków-Płaszów concentration camp, is portrayed in Steven Spielberg's movie Schindler's List. He later became known as the "Israeli Walt Disney".

== Early life and career ==
Bau was born on 18 June 1920 to a middle-class Jewish family in Kraków. Coming from a non-religious family, he attended a non-Jewish primary school then due to Poland's race laws had to attend a Jewish high-school.

After high-school, he trained as a graphic artist at the Jan Matejko Academy of Fine Arts in Kraków, Poland. His education was interrupted by World War II and he was transferred to the Płaszów concentration camp in late 1942 from the Kraków Ghetto. Having a talent in gothic lettering, he was employed in the camp for making signs and maps for the Germans. While in Płaszów, Bau created a miniature, the size of his hand, illustrated book with his own poetry. He also forged documents and identity papers for people who managed to escape from the camp.

During his imprisonment, Bau fell in love with another prisoner, Rebecca Tennenbaum. They were secretly married, despite the prohibition by the Germans, in the women's barracks of Płaszów. Their wedding was dramatized in Steven Spielberg's Academy Award-winning movie Schindler's List, where he was played by Rami Heuberger. Bau as himself appears in the film's epilogue placing a stone on Oskar Schindler's grave in Jerusalem, along with his wife Rebecca.

Bau was transferred to Gross-Rosen concentration camp after Płaszów and then to Schindler's camp where he stayed until the end of the war, while Rebecca was sent to Auschwitz. It was not until the release of Schindler's List in 1993 Bau learned Rebecca, who was a manicurist for Amon Goeth and also knew of Schindler, got his name on the list, choosing him instead of herself "because my husband was more important to me than I was, and I wasn't afraid".

After liberation, Bau was reunited with his wife and finished his degree at University of Plastic Arts in Kraków. In 1950, he immigrated to Israel together with his wife and three-year-old daughter, Hadassah, where their other daughter, Clila, was born. In Israel, Bau worked as a graphic artist at the Brandwein Institute in Haifa and for the government of Israel. He went on to create his own animated films and was referred to in the press as the "Israeli Walt Disney" or as the "founder of Israel's animation industry".

His wife Rebecca died in 1997. The following year, Bau's memoir Dear God, Have You Ever Gone Hungry? was published. Originally written in Hebrew the book was translated in Polish, English and several other languages. A Kirkus reviewer noted his humor and wit in the face of inhumanity. He was nominated for the Israel Prize the same year.

== Death ==
Bau died in Tel Aviv on 24 May 2002, at age 81.

== Published works and exhibitions ==
- Baʾu, Yosef (1998). Dear God, have you ever gone hungry? memoirs (1st ed.). New York: Arcade Pub. ISBN 978-1-55970-431-1. (Republished in 2025, titled Bau: artist at war)

=== Exhibitions ===
- When Joseph Bau Bites, (1998) - Jewish Community Center, Baltimore, Maryland
- Knesset parliament building (2004)
- The Holocaust Against the Sinti and Roma and Present Day Racism in Europe (2007) - United Nations
- People from Schindler’s List (2012) - Oskar Schindler's Factory Museum
- Joseph Bau: Artist, Counterfeiter and Mossad Agent, (2024) - Adolph and Rose Levis JCC - Sandler Center, Boca Raton, Florida

== Legacy ==
Bau's paintings and drawings have been listed by Sotheby's as significant contributions to the art of the Holocaust and his works have been shown in galleries in the US.

The Joseph Bau House Museum, located in Tel-Aviv, is a studio that contains Bau's works, personal documents and other works. In 2024, the museum was designated as one of the "Best of the Best" for Specialty Museums in Israel by TripAdvisor.

In 2024, the film Bau: Artist at War about the lives of Rebecca and Joseph was released, directed by Sean McNamara and starring Emile Hirsch.
