= Werewolf: The Beast Among Us =

- Official DVD Cover
- Directed by: Louis Morneau
- Screenplay by: Michael Tabb; Louis Morneau; Catherine Cyran
- Story by: Michael Tabb
- Produced by: Mike Elliott
- Starring: Ed Quinn; Stephen Rea; Guy Wilson; Nia Peeples; Rachel DiPillo; Adam Croasdell; Ana Ularu; Steven Bauer
- Cinematography: Philip Robertson
- Edited by: Mike Jackson
- Music by: Michael Wandmacher
- Production company: Universal 1440 Entertainment
- Distributed by: Universal Studios Home Entertainment
- Release date: October 9, 2012
- Running time: 93 minutes
- Country: United States
- Language: English

Werewolf: The Beast Among Us is a 2012 horror film directed and co-written by Louis Morneau. The film stars Ed Quinn, Stephen Rea, Guy Wilson and Steven Bauer.

== Plot ==
In the 19th century, a boy named Charles watches as a werewolf slaughters his family. Before dying, Charles' mother gives him a silver amulet of a wolf head, which belonged to his grandfather, a "Great Hunter" of werewolves. Charles escapes death by activating a trap which causes a chandelier to fall and kill the werewolf. Twenty-five years later, Charles has grown into a werewolf bounty-hunter, shooting those infected with lycanthropy, before burning their bodies. Charles and his band of bounty-hunters receive an offer to hunt down a werewolf of a new breed; one which three nights in a row, as opposed to just the full moon.

Daniel, a young man apprenticed to the town doctor, has been studying the werewolf's victims to understand how it is behaving. Daniel witnesses an arriving Charles expose a scam run by a competing werewolf bounty-hunter, Jaeger, (Note: German for "Hunter".) on the townsfolk. Impressed, Daniel repeatedly offers his assistance to Charles, until the latter reluctantly accepts it. Eva, Daniel's rich girlfriend, tries to talk him out of hunting the werewolf and accepting an offer to study at the medical college in the city but fails. Stefan, a companion of Charles, flirts with Eva, much to Daniel's annoyance.

During the next full moon, Jaeger and some friends try to poach the werewolf from Charles' group. Instead, they are tricked into triggering all of the traps that Charles and company had carefully prepared earlier. In doing so, the werewolf reveals that it is as intelligent as a person, not the mindless animal that werewolves usually are. The local Romani leader tells Charles and Daniel that the werewolf will soon be able to transform at will. Having lost faith in the bounty-hunters, the townsfolk decide to take matters into their own hands. The town constable has established a list of people who have insufficient alibis to not be the werewolf, so some townsfolk lock them in jail. Daniel's mother, Vadoma, is locked away and placed under armed guard, as are Eva's father and the town constable.

The next night, the constable has an epileptic seizure and is shot by the guards, who mistakenly believe him to be in the throes of transformation. Now panicking, the guards shoot and kill every prisoner except for Vadoma and the Romani leader. Vadoma manages to escape from her cell. In the nearby ruins, Jaeger, who narrowly survived the previous night, is used as bait in a new trap by Charles. The werewolf battles Charles and his companions and wins but decides not to kill them, much to everyone's confusion. Daniel, who has become haunted by nightmares of a werewolf, wakes up the next morning with injuries matching those sustained by the monster the night before. Horrified to discover that he is the werewolf, Daniel confronts his mother, who tries to convince him to flee with her. Daniel refuses to leave and instead makes his way to town.

Charles interrogates the doctor, confirming his suspicions that Daniel might be the werewolf. He then confronts Daniel, who begs Charles to kill him. Instead, the doctor shoots Charles from behind, and confesses to training Daniel to hunt and kill people. Horrified, Daniel flees to Eva's house, where Stefan is assaulting her. Stefan and Daniel fight to a stalemate, despite Daniel's werewolf strength. Stefan ambushes Daniel and knocks him out when he leaves Eva's house. That night, Stefan puts Daniel on display for the townsfolk to see him transform. Daniel transforms, breaks free of his shackles, and flees. Vadoma, pleading with the townsfolk to spare her son, is killed by mistake.

Stefan and Daniel battle it out in front of Eva. Stefan turns out to be a hundred-year-old wurdalak, granting him unnatural strength and toughness. Daniel impales Stefan on a spike, causing Stefan's body to disintegrate. The doctor appears and orders Daniel, who is still in werewolf form, to kill Eva. Instead, Charles appears and shoots the doctor from behind. Daniel turns back to normal, and Charles lets him go, giving him the amulet and saying that he is the hunter now. Eva and Daniel kiss while Charles and crew walk away.

== Cast ==
- Ed Quinn as Charles
  - Ștefan Iancu as Young Charles
- Guy Wilson as Daniel
- Stephen Rea as Doc
- Rachel DiPillo as Eva
- Adam Croasdell as Stefan
- Ana Ularu as Kazia
- Florin Piersic Jr. as Fang
- Steven Bauer as Hyde
- Nia Peeples as Vadoma

== Production ==
Werewolf: The Beast Among Us was filmed in Romania, with some scenes shot in Bethlen Castle.

== Reception ==
The film has an aggregate score on Rotten Tomatoes of 40%, based on 5 reviews. A review of the DVD at IGN stated, "Werewolf: The Beast Among Us isn't a total misfire. It's just not a very memorable, or potent, chapter in the werewolf subgenre. Instead, it's a dull, lifeless retread of tired werewolf cliches and sloppy DTV junk. Still, it should make a decent enough midnight movie for hardcore werewolf fans".

== See also ==
- Werewolf fiction
