= Inbar Lavi =

Israeli actress

- ענבר לביא
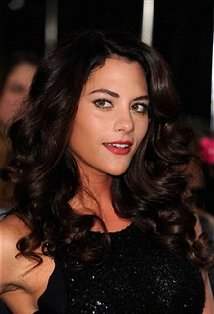
- Lavi in 2013
- Born: October 27, 1986 (age 40); Ramat Gan, Israel
- Education: Lee Strasberg Theatre and Film Institute
- Occupation: Actress
- Years active: 2004–present
- Spouse: Dan Bar Shira (m. 2021)
- Children: 1

Inbar Lavi (Hebrew: ענבר לביא; born October 27, 1986) is an Israeli actress. She is known for portraying Raviva on the 2012 MTV series Underemployed, Vee on the 2014 Fox television series Gang Related, and Sheba on the Fox series Prison Break. Lavi starred in the 2017–2018 Bravo television series Imposters, and played Eve in the final three seasons of the Netflix series Lucifer. She also appeared in The Last Ship on TNT.

== Early life ==
Lavi was born and raised in Ramat Gan, Israel to a Jewish family from Holon. Lavi's mother has Moroccan origins while her father is of Polish and Bosnian descent. As a child, she suffered from asthma and had to use a nebulizer for 45 minutes at a time. During that time, she watched movies, and "fell in love with cinema". One of her early inspirations was the performance of Israeli-American actress Natalie Portman in Léon: The Professional. Another of her role models was Israeli actress Ayelet Zurer.

Lavi studied ballet and modern dance at the Kiryat Sharet high school in Holon, Israel. She then studied acting at the Sophie Moskowitz School of Acting in Tel Aviv, Israel.

== Career ==
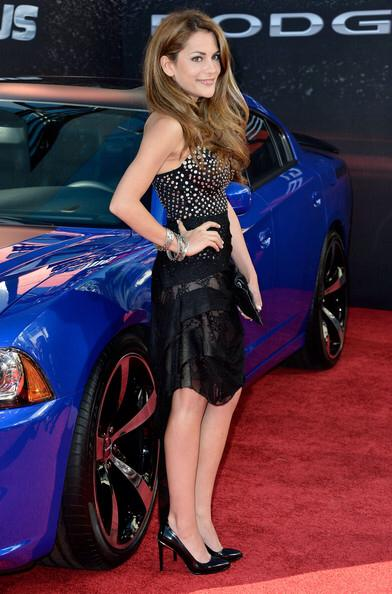
Lavi in 2013

In 2004, at the age of 17, Lavi moved to New York City, where she performed in various off-Broadway productions. After eight months, she moved to Los Angeles, after being accepted with a full scholarship to the Lee Strasberg Theatre and Film Institute. Among her earliest English-speaking roles was Cordelia in a 2006 production of King Lear, starring and directed by Tom Badal.

Starting in 2009, Lavi began making guest appearances on television shows including Entourage, The Closer, Ghost Whisperer, Criminal Minds, CSI: Miami and In Plain Sight. She has also appeared in films including Tales of an Ancient Empire (2010), Street Kings 2: Motor City (2011) and House of Dust (2013).

Lavi starred in the 2012 MTV television series Underemployed as Raviva, a pregnant, aspiring singer. She portrayed Veronica "Vee" Dotsen in the 2014 Fox television series Gang Related. She appeared in the seventh season of Sons of Anarchy as street prostitute Winsome.

In 2015 Lavi was cast in the lead role in the Bravo television series Imposters (originally titled My So Called Wife), playing "a Machiavellian con-artist and master of disguise"; the series premiered in February 2017. She was cast in the recurring role of Ravit Bivas, a highly trained Israeli soldier, on the second season of the TNT naval drama The Last Ship in summer 2015. In 2016 Lavi joined the Prison Break revival in the role of Sheba, a Yemeni activist. She joined the cast of Lucifer for the series' fourth season, playing Eve, the first woman made and mother to Cain and Abel.

In 2023, Inbar joined the fourth season of the Israeli TV show "Fauda" as Shani Russo.

== Personal life ==
Lavi was in a relationship with Christoph Sanders that later ended. She married Dan Bar Shira, in Israel in August 2021. They reside in Los Angeles.

== Filmography ==
=== Film ===
Year	Title	Role	Notes
2010	Abelar: Tales of an Ancient Empire	Alana	
2011	Street Kings 2: Motor City	Leilah Sullivan	Direct-to-video film
2011	Getting That Girl	Jenna Jeffries	
2011	Underground	Lillith Trog	
2012	For the Love of Money	Talia	
2013	House of Dust	Emma	
2015	The Last Witch Hunter	Sonia	
2018	Sorry for Your Loss	Lori	
2024	The Manifestation	Roni/Vronika	
2024	Bau: Artist at War	Rebecca Bau	
2025	Black Diamond	Elena	

=== Television ===
Year	Title	Role	Notes
2008	Privileged	Fiona	Episode: "All about Honesty"
2009	The Closer	Vanessa Almassian	Episode: "Maternal Instincts"
2009	Entourage	Sadie	Episode: "Security Briefs"
2009	Ghost Whisperer	Brianna	Episode: "See No Evil"
2009	Criminal Minds	Gina King	Episode: "The Performer"
2009	Crash	Sydney	Episode: "Master of Puppets"
2010	CSI: Miami	Maya Farooq	Episode: "Dishonor"
2010	In Plain Sight	Flora Montero	Episode: "A Priest Walks into a Bar"
2011	Charlie's Angels	Dominique Berry	Episode: "Royal Angels"
2012	Immigrants	Miri Yechiel	Television film
2012	CSI: Crime Scene Investigation	Chastity/Heather Tile	Episode: "Strip Maul"
2012–2013	Underemployed	Raviva	Main role
2014	Gang Related	Veronica "Vee" Dotsen	Main role
2014	Sons of Anarchy	Winsome	Episodes: "Greensleeves", "Faith and Despondency"
2015	Castle	Farrah Darwaza	Episode: "In Plane Sight"
2015	The Last Ship	Lt. Ravit Bivas	Recurring role (season 2), 6 episodes
2017–2018	Imposters	Maddie	Lead role
2017	Prison Break	Sheba	Main role (season 5)
2019–2021	Lucifer	Eve	Main role (season 4); recurring role (seasons 5–6)
2020	Stumptown	Max	Episodes: "The Past and the Furious", "Dirty Dexy Money", “The Dex Factor”
2021	Eight Gifts of Hanukkah	Sarah	Television film
2022	Fauda	Shani Russo	Main role (season 4)
