= Danny Pintauro =

American actor and film producer (born 1976)

- Born: Daniel John Pintauro; January 6, 1976 (age 50); Milltown, New Jersey, U.S.
- Occupations: Actor, voice artist, film producer
- Years active: 1982–1992, 2001–present
- Spouse: Wil Tabares (m. 2014)

Daniel John Pintauro (born January 6, 1976) is an American actor and film producer. He starred in the sitcom Who's the Boss? and the 1983 horror film Cujo.

== Early life and education ==
Pintauro was born in Milltown, New Jersey, the son of John J. Pintauro, a manager, and Margaret L. (née Sillcocks). In 1994 he took time off from professional acting and attended Middlesex County College in Edison, New Jersey, and later Stanford University to study English and theater; he graduated in 1998 with a Bachelor of Arts in Drama.

== Career ==
Pintauro first appeared on the television soap opera As the World Turns as the original Paul Ryan. After this, he played Tad in the film Cujo. He first came to prominence on the television series Who's the Boss?. After the series ended, he was less frequently cast. Pintauro went on to act in stage productions like The Velocity of Gary and Mommie Queerest.

He appeared as a contestant on a special TV child stars episode of The Weakest Link in 2001 where he got voted off in round 4.

Pintauro worked as a Tupperware sales representative and a restaurant manager in Las Vegas.

Pintauro and his husband relocated to Austin, Texas, in 2016. In May 2019, Pintauro was working as a vet tech at Austin Pets Alive. In 2022, Pintauro returned to acting and moved back to California.

In recent years, Pintauro has been candid about the financial realities of his post-child acting career. As of 2026, he has supplemented his income by working as an Amazon delivery driver to sustain his everyday life, noting that residuals from his tenure on Who’s the Boss? are insufficient to meet modern living costs. In addition to his delivery work, Pintauro has pursued entrepreneurship, successfully launching a side business creating and selling 'booknooks' at local fairs in Long Beach, with over 165 units sold since November 2024.

== Personal life ==
In 1997, the National Enquirer tabloid outed him as gay. In April 2013 he was engaged to his boyfriend, Wil Tabares, and they married in April 2014.

Pintauro revealed in 2015 that he was HIV positive, having contracted the virus as the result of unsafe oral sex in 2003. He also disclosed that he had previously been addicted to methamphetamine.

== Filmography ==
Film
Year	Title	Role	Notes
1983	Cujo	Tad Trenton	
1984	The Beniker Gang	Ben Beniker	
2006	The Still Life	Stefan	

Television
Year	Title	Role	Notes
1982–1983	As the World Turns	Paul Ryan	
1987	Highway to Heaven	Alex	2 episodes, Man's Best Friend Parts 1 & 2
1984–1992	Who's the Boss?	Jonathan Bower	196 Episodes
1987	Timestalkers	Billy McKenzie	Television film
2001	The Weakest Link	Himself	TV Child Stars edition
2010	The Secret Life of the American Teenager		Episode: Ben There, Done That
2015	Oprah: Where Are They Now?	Himself	Interview with Oprah Winfrey
2016	Unsure/Positive.	Greg	Web series
2022	A Country Christmas Harmony	Eugene	Television film
