= Guy Wilson (actor) =

American actor (born 1985)

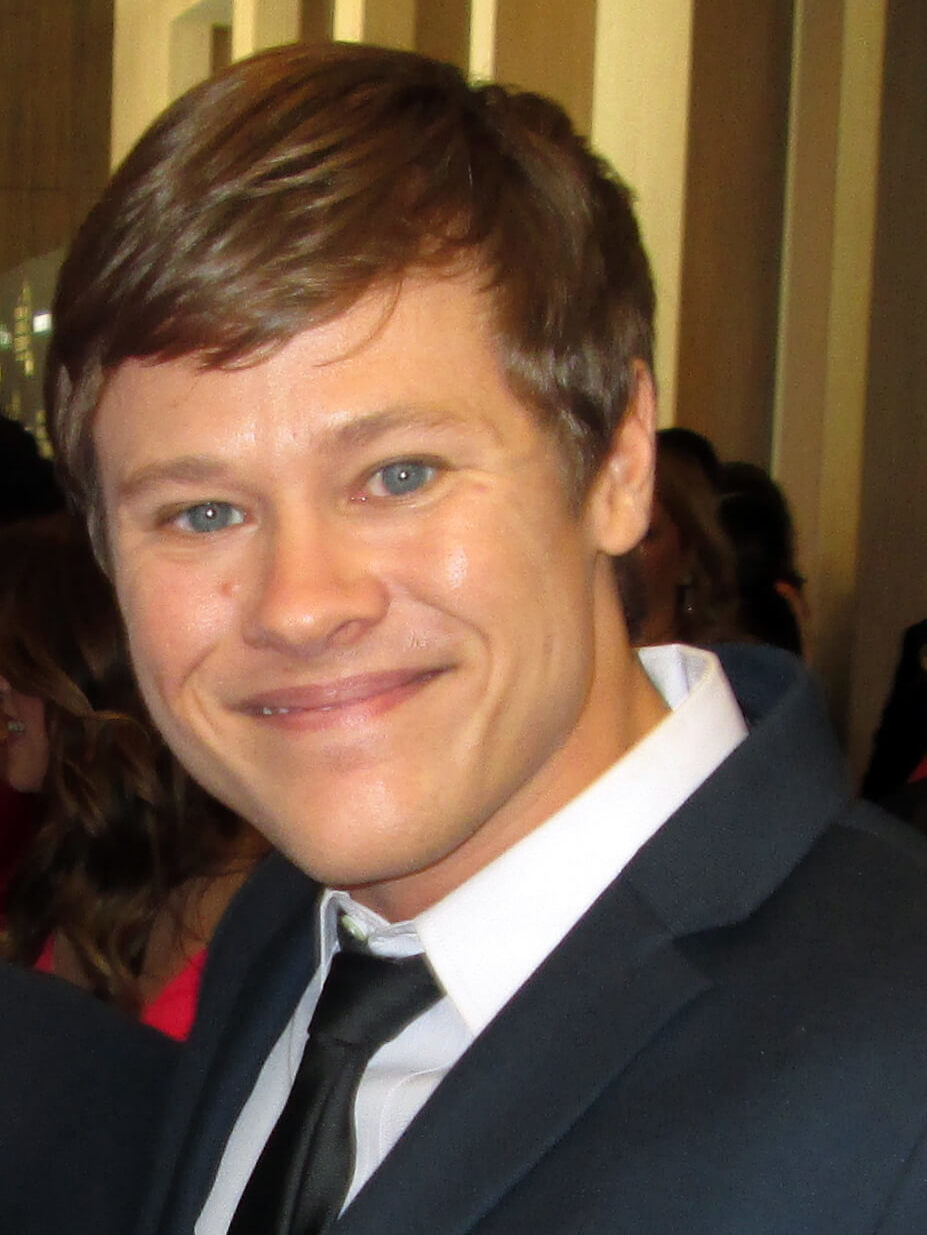
- Wilson at the 41st Daytime Emmy Awards, 2014
- Born: Guy Allan Wilson Jr. November 21, 1985 (age 40); San Francisco, California, U.S.
- Occupation: Actor
- Years active: 2004–present

Guy Allan Wilson Jr. (born November 21, 1985) is an American actor, known for his roles in such television series as NCIS, Castle, Bones, and Breaking Bad, as well the feature film Werewolf: The Beast Among Us. He portrayed Will Horton on the daytime soap opera Days of Our Lives from 2014 to 2015.

== Early life ==
Wilson was born in San Francisco, California, and was raised in Sebastopol, a city in Sonoma County, California. His introduction to acting came thanks to his mother, Janis Wilson, a musical composer and musician. When he was nine years old, she was directing a local production of A Christmas Carol. Wilson agreed to take part at the suggestion of his mother and was cast as Tiny Tim. From that moment on he continued doing theater as a child. While he didn't do theater in high school, he partook in concerts and marching bands in which he played alto and tenor saxophone.

At fifteen, Wilson decided that he wanted to become a professional actor. While in high school he signed with Look Talent, a San Francisco talent agency. At seventeen, he began studying at the American Conservatory Theater in San Francisco. Shortly thereafter, he landed a manager in Los Angeles who began getting him auditions.

== Career ==
Wilson has appeared in feature films such as Werewolf: The Beast Among Us (2012) and The Midnight Game (2013).

Upon posting a cryptic message on his official Facebook fan page that indicated that he had some major news that he couldn't yet reveal, actress Jen Lilley let it slip in an interview that Wilson had landed the role of Will Horton on the long-running daytime soap opera Days of Our Lives, a show in which she also appeared. He made his debut on the soap on January 8, 2014, and exited the role on October 9, 2015.

Aside from his television and film work, Wilson has been cast in an array of television commercials for companies such as Allstate and AT&T. His first national commercial was for the video game Star Wars: Battlefront.

== Personal life ==
Wilson is the namesake of his father, Guy Wilson, an attorney and the former mayor of Sebastopol. Wilson currently resides in Los Angeles with his two cats. He is an avid sports fan. His favorite teams include the San Francisco Giants, the San Francisco 49ers, and Everton FC. He has two siblings: a younger sister, Valerie, who is a sculptor, and a younger brother, Willie.

== Filmography ==
=== Film ===
| Year | Title | Role | Notes |
|---|---|---|---|
| 2004 | Little Black Book | Sean | |
| 2008 | The Moon and He | He | Short |
| 2008 | The Open Door | Jerry | |
| 2008 | Danny Fricke | Nick Stockwell | TV movie |
| 2009 | Gurdian | Jake | |
| 2009 | Constitution, USA | William Johnson | Short |
| 2010 | Almost Kings | Wood | |
| 2012 | Werewolf: The Beast Among Us | Daniel | Video |
| 2013 | The Midnight Game | Shane | |
| 2014 | Swelter | Johnny | |
| 2014 | Simon Says | The Intern | Short |
| 2014 | Altergeist | Dean Lewis | |
| 2014 | Rise | | |
| 2014 | Swelter | Johnny | |
| 2014 | Simon Says | The Intern | Short |
| 2015 | Larry Gaye: Renegade Male Flight Attendant | Rhodes Scholar | |
| 2018 | Tell Me When To Forget | Nic | Short - In Post-Production |
| 2019 | Disappearance (2019 film) | Detective Bailey | |
| 2023 | As Certain as Death | Eli | |
| 2023 | Onyx the Fortuitous and the Talisman of Souls | Tanner | |
| 2026 | Día de Muertos (Day of the Dead) † | Harper | |

=== Television ===
| Year | Title | Role | Notes |
|---|---|---|---|
| 2005 | Cold Case | Pledge | Episode: "The Promise" |
| 2006 | General Hospital | Teen Luke Spencer | Episode aired on March 10, 2006 |
| 2010 | Castle | Jeffrey McGuigan | Episode: "Last Call" |
| 2010 | Twentysixmiles | Deckhand | Episode: "Family Affair" |
| 2011 | NCIS | Paul Simmons | Episode: "Recruited" |
| 2011 | Bones | Buster | Episode: "The Memories in the Shallow Grave" |
| 2012 | Major Crimes | Mark Howard | Episode: "Citizen's Arrest" |
| 2012 | Hawaii Five-0 | Jake Madsen | Episode: "Popilikia" |
| 2013 | Breaking Bad | Trent | Episode: "Confessions" |
| 2014–15 | Days of Our Lives | Will Horton | Regular, Contract |
| 2015 | Rizzoli & Isles | Chaz | Episode: Fake It Till You Make It |
| 2023 | Bosch: Legacy | Detective Kevin Long | |
