= Spencer Daniels =

American film and television actor

- Born: Spencer Eli Daniels; December 23, 1992 (age 33); Tarzana, Los Angeles, California, United States
- Occupation: Actor
- Years active: 2003–present
- Height: 6' (1.83 m)
- Website: spencerdaniels.tv

Spencer Eli Daniels (born December 23, 1992) is an American film and television actor born in Tarzana, Los Angeles. He began acting professionally at the age of ten and has appeared in over 30 films and TV series including The Curious Case of Benjamin Button (2008) and Star Trek (2009). He portrayed Tyler Lomand in a recurring role on the Starz series Crash (2008-2009). In 2013, he appeared in The Midnight Game which was released by Anchor Bay Entertainment.

== Personal life ==
Daniels is Jewish.

== Filmography ==
=== Film ===
Year	Film	Role	Notes
2004	Billy Conroy Takes a Stand	Billy Conroy	
2004	Billy's Dad Is a Fudge-Packer!	Billy	
2005	Witchwise	Andrew	
2008	The Least of These	Alex	
2008	The Curious Case of Benjamin Button	Benjamin Button – age 12	
2009	Star Trek	Johnny	
2010	Au Pair, Kansas	Atticus	
2010	Pigeon Kicker	Scott/Real Adam	
2011	Awakening Arthur	Aiden	
2011	Dangerously Close	Christian "Sketch" Shady	Short film
2011	Last Kind Words	Eli	
2012	Thunderstruck	Connor	
2013	The Midnight Game	Jeff	
2014	California Scheming	Jason Rourke	
2016	Wolves at the Door	William	
2017	Pitching Tents	Stash	
2018	Take Point	Logan	
2020	Hunter's Moon	Lenny Bloomfield	
2020	Chasing Nightmares	Matthew	

=== Television ===
Year	Film	Role	Notes
2003	The Lyon's Den	Boy on Bicycle	Episode: Pilot
2003	Judging Amy	Child in Custody Battle	Episode: "The Best Interests of the Child"
2003	MADtv	Skeeter	Episode: "Episode 10"
2004	10-8: Officers on Duty	Little Boy	Episode: "Flirtin' with Disaster"
2004	Cold Case	Jerry Kasher	Episode: "The Plan"
2004	The John Henson Project	Lee Elia	Episode: Pilot
2005	It's Always Sunny in Philadelphia	Tommy Doyle	Episode: "Charlie Wants an Abortion"
2006–2013	The Office	Jake Palmer	3 episodes
2008	Twenty Good Years	Young John Mason	Episode: "Come Fly With Me"
2009	Big Love	Hustler	Episode: "Empire"
2009	Crash	Tyler Lomand	Recurring role
2009	NCIS	Brett Murphy	Episode: "Child's Play"
2010	CSI Miami	Nick West	Episode: "F-T-F"
2011	Shake It Up	Paul	Episode: "Beam It Up"
2013–2014, 2016	Mom	Luke	Main role (seasons 1–2); guest role (season 4); 21 episodes
2014	Major Crimes	Chip	Episode: "Party Foul"
2017	The Get Down	Kent	Episode: "Unfold Your Own Myth"
2018–2020	The Magicians	Charlton	Recurring role (season 3–5)
2019	NCIS: Los Angeles	PO2 Vincent Davis	Episode: "False Flag"
2019	The Passage	Brian	Episode: "Last Lesson"
