= Jennifer Dundas =

American actress (born 1971)

- Born: January 14, 1971 (age 55); Boston, Massachusetts, U.S.
- Occupations: Actress, Entrepreneur
- Years active: 1982–present
- Children: 1

Jennifer Dundas, credited as Jennie Dundas in her early work, is an American entrepreneur and actress. She is perhaps best known for her role in The First Wives Club as Chris Paradis, the lesbian daughter of Annie Paradis, played by Diane Keaton. Dundas began her career as a child in 1984 when she played the precocious daughter of Keaton's titular character in Mrs. Soffel. After being discovered at the age of 9 in her hometown of Boston, Massachusetts, Dundas starred on and off-Broadway and in films for decades.

== Biography ==
Dundas was born in Boston and attended Brown University. Jules Feiffer discovered her when, at age 9, she performed in a play at a summer camp. She also portrayed a young Gloria Vanderbilt in Little Gloria... Happy at Last.

Films in which Dundas has appeared include Puccini for Beginners, Legal Eagles, The Beniker Gang and The Hotel New Hampshire. She has guest starred in TV shows such as Anastasia: The Mystery of Anna, Desperate Housewives and Law and Order: Criminal Intent.

On stage, Dundas has performed in the New York Theatre, including the play Arcadia. She won an Obie (Off-Broadway) Award for her performance in Good as New by Peter Hedges. In 2004, she portrayed Laura in The Glass Menagerie at the Kennedy Center for the Performing Arts.

== Filmography ==
=== Film ===
	Title	Role	Notes
1984	The Hotel New Hampshire	Lily Berry	credited as Jennie Dundas
1984	Mrs. Soffel	Margaret Soffel	credited as Jennie Dundas
1984	The Beniker Gang	Cassie Beniker	
1985	Heaven Help Us	Boo Dunn	credited as Jennie Dundas
1986	Legal Eagles	Jennifer Logan	credited as Jennie Dundas
1992	Lorenzo's Oil	Nancy Jo	
1994	Radioland Murders	Deirdre	
1996	The First Wives Club	Chris Paradis	
2000	Swimming	Nicola Jenrette	
2002	Changing Lanes	Mina Dunne	
2006	Puccini for Beginners	Molly	
2017	The Post	Liz Hylton	
2019	Brittany Runs a Marathon	Shannon	
2022	Master	Julianne	

=== Television ===
Year	Title	Role	Notes
1982	Little Gloria... Happy at Last	Gloria Vanderbilt	TV film
1985	American Playhouse	Anne Putnam Jr.	"Three Sovereigns for Sarah: Part 1"
1986	Anastasia: The Mystery of Anna	Anastasia	TV film
1991	ABC Afterschool Special	Katie Dunn	"In the Shadow of Love: A Teen AIDS Story"
1999	The Kinsey 3	Melissa	TV film
2000	Judging Amy	Kimberly Ryan	"The God Thing"
2000	Law & Order: Special Victims Unit	Jamie McKenna	"Legacy"
2001	Law & Order: Criminal Intent	Dana Nolan	"Jones"
2001	The Education of Max Bickford	Caitlyn Ryan	"It's Not the Wrapping, It's the Candy"
2002	Benjamin Franklin	Catherine Ray	TV miniseries documentary
2003	Queens Supreme	Ms. Journo	"Supreme Heat"
2005	NCIS	Lynn Simons	"Conspiracy Theory"
2006	Desperate Housewives	Rebecca Shepard	"Beautiful Girls", "The Miracle Song"
2012	Nurse Jackie	Roberta	"The Wall"
2018	The Looming Tower	Mary Jo White	"Now it Begins…", "Mercury"
