= Mike S. Ryan =

American film producer

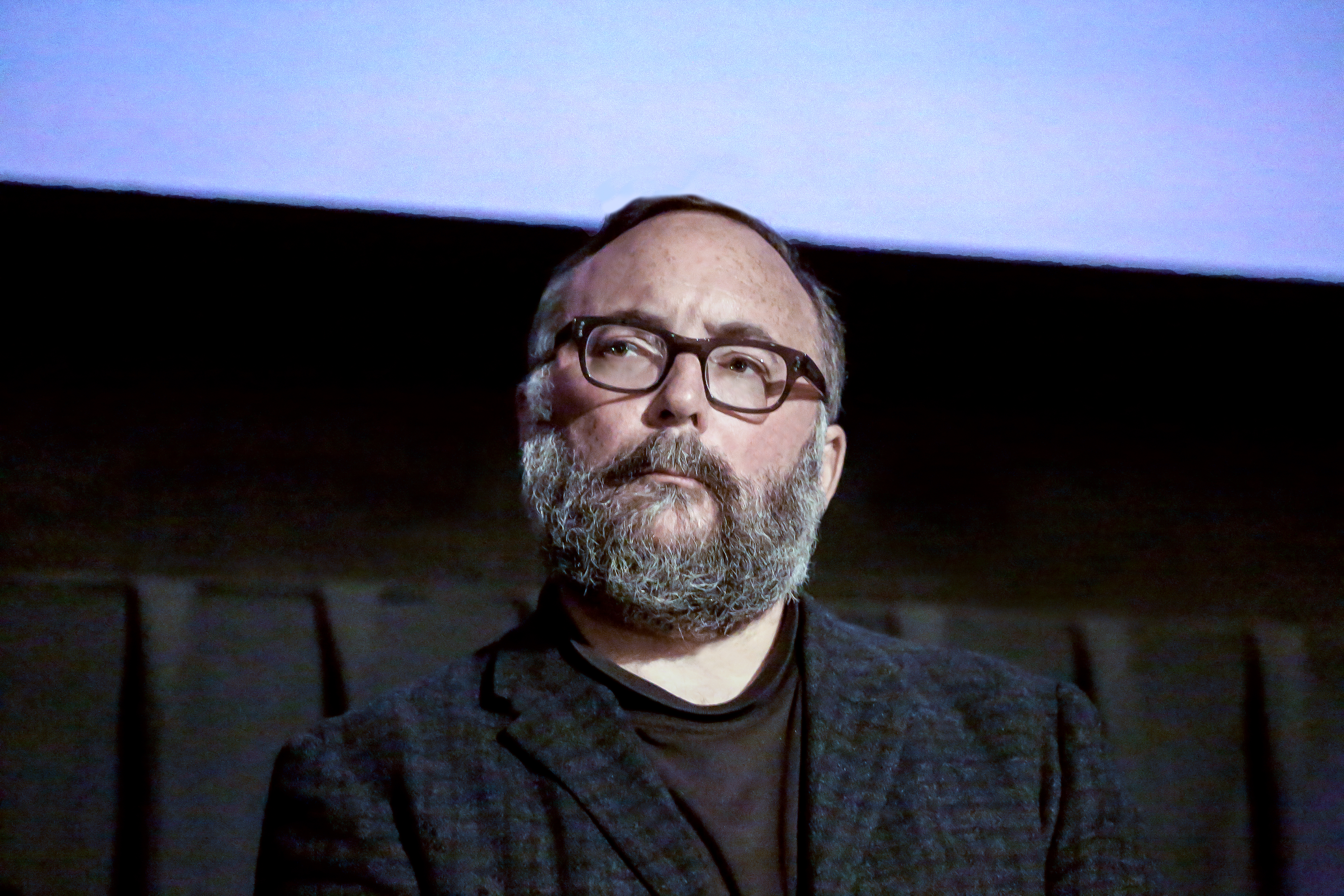
- Ryan in 2016
- Other names: Michael S. Ryan
- Occupation: Producer
- Years active: 2004–present

Michael S. Ryan is an American film producer. He is most known for producing the indie feature Junebug, starring Amy Adams. He has also made films with Kelly Reichardt, Hal Hartley, Bela Tarr, Todd Solondz, and Rick Alverson.

In 2006, Ryan was nominated for an Independent Spirit Producer of the Year Award and was one of Variety's 2007 “10 Producers to Watch." His works have included Old Joy, Choke, and Palindromes. He began his career as a location manager for Ang Lee and an associate producer for MTV. Ryan's most recent over-seas project, The Cry of Granuaile, was expected to premiere at the Virgin Media Dublin International Film Festival in March 2022.

Ryan is a member of the Academy of Motion Picture Arts and Sciences. As of 2023, Ryan is an associate professor at Emerson College.

== Filmography ==
=== As producer ===
- Stay at Conder Beach (2019)
- Reunion (2018)
- Faith (2018)
- The Artist's Wife (2018)
- The Sweet Life (2017)
- Maya Dardel (2017)
- Sweet, Sweet Lonely Girl (2016)
- The Missing Girl (2015)
- Free in Deed (2015)
- Last Weekend (2014)
- Between Us (2012)
- The Comedy (2012)
- Losers Take All (2011)
- About Sunny (2011)
- Lake City (2008)
- Liberty Kid (2007)
- Fay Grim (2006)
- Junebug (2005)
- Palindromes (2004)

==== Short ====
- Midwinter (2016)

=== As executive producer ===
- The Cry of Granuaile (2020)
- The Turin Horse (2011)
- Meek's Cutoff (2010)
- Audrey the Trainwreck (2010)
- Life During Wartime (2009)
- Choke (2008)
- Old Joy (2006)

==== Short ====
- Open My Eyes (2015)
- Weekend Away (2013)
- A Little Lost (2011)

=== As line producer ===
- Grain (2017)
- Soy Nero (2016)
- Forty Shades of Blue (2005)
