= Ghosts (Person of Interest) =

- Person of Interest episode
- Episode no.: Season 1 Episode 2
- Directed by: Richard J. Lewis
- Written by: Greg Plageman; Jonathan Nolan
- Cinematography by: Teodoro Maniaci
- Editing by: Ray Daniels
- Production code: 2J6202
- Original air date: September 29, 2011
- Running time: 44 minutes

Guest appearances
- Brett Cullen as Nathan Ingram; Ritchie Coster as Assassin; Molly Price as Elizabeth Whitaker; Valentina de Angelis as Theresa Whitaker; Danny Mastrogiorgio as Derek Whitaker; Remy Auberjonois as Jimmy Calhoun; Randall Newsome as Alderman

Episode chronology
← Previous "Pilot"	Next → "Mission Creep"

"Ghosts" is the second episode of the first season of the American television drama series Person of Interest. It is the 2nd overall episode of the series and is written by Greg Plageman and series creator Jonathan Nolan and directed by co-executive producer Richard J. Lewis. It aired on CBS in the United States and on CTV in Canada on September 29, 2011.

== Plot ==
Reese (Jim Caviezel) manages to save a man from being murdered by hitmen on an elevator and leaves the scene. He is soon contacted by Finch (Michael Emerson) telling him to go to a cemetery. Finch tells him that their new number is of Theresa Whitaker, a girl who was thought to have died along with the rest of her family. Theresa's father was a businessman whose empire fell because of a financial crash and he is thought to have killed his family.

With help from Fusco (Kevin Chapman), Reese gets more information about Theresa. After questioning one of her friends, Reese finds Theresa (Valentina de Angelis) robbing an ATM and she flees after she cuts his hand. Posing as an insurance employee, Finch questions Theresa's aunt Elizabeth (Molly Price) in Brooklyn Heights, who loved Theresa like her own, and gets her ex-husband's Derek's (Danny Mastrogiorgio) number. Reese interrogates a hitman in jail who was hired to perpetrate the murders. Reese meets him in prison where he is serving a life sentence for another murder, and he reveals that he refused to kill Theresa as he does not kill children. However, due to child killers not being popular in prison, the hitman has been defending his honor, and the information reached the men who hired him. This caused whoever hired him to hire a new hitman to find Theresa and kill her.

Searching on Derek's records, Reese and Finch begin investigating Landale Financial, which may be involved in the murders, finding Derek meeting with the owner Jimmy Calhoun (Remy Auberjonois). Reese again finds Theresa when they are attacked by the hitman (Ritchie Coster). Both manage to escape and hide in a hotel room and Finch decides to stay to take care of her. Reese meets with Derek and makes him confess what happened. It turns out Theresa's father had assets that were going to be given to Derek. Due to severe problems after hiring Landale, Calhoun ordered his murder. As he is the "sole" member of the family alive, he is the only owner of the assets and Theresa's status could damage the assets' control.

Going home, Derek is killed by the hitman when he refuses to give away Theresa's whereabouts. The hitman tracks a call between Theresa and her aunt and locates the hotel where she is. Finch and Theresa manage to evade the hitman for a short time, but when he finally corners them and is about to shoot, the hitman instead gets shot by Reese.

Reese calls Carter (Taraji P. Henson) for a meeting where Reese directs her to find Theresa. With her testimony, Calhoun is arrested. However, she decides not to give up Reese to the authorities. At the station Theresa has an emotional reunion with her Aunt Elizabeth. Reese also finds that Finch quit his job in the insurance office, as he wishes to keep his personal life a secret.

In flashbacks to 2002, Finch is joined by a colleague Nathan Ingram (Brett Cullen) and shows him an early version of the Machine with the basic task of watching over New York City. Finch also says he is teaching the Machine how to track people. In 2007, Ingram questions the Machine's function of irrelevant crimes while Finch explains that the Machine is supposed "to save everybody". It's revealed in the present that the office where Finch works has a memorial bust for Ingram, who is revealed to have died in 2010.

== Reception ==
=== Viewers ===
In its original American broadcast, "Ghosts" was seen by an estimated 12.51 million household viewers and gained a 2.7/7 ratings share among adults aged 18–49, according to Nielsen Media Research. This was a 7% decrease in viewership from the previous episode, which was watched by 13.33 million viewers with a 3.1/8 in the 18-49 demographics. With these ratings, Person of Interest was the second most watched show on CBS for the night behind The Big Bang Theory, third on its timeslot and for the night in the 18-49 demographics, behind Private Practice, The Office, Grey's Anatomy, The X Factor, and The Big Bang Theory.

=== Critical reviews ===
"Ghosts" received generally positive reviews from critics. Zack Handlen of The A.V. Club gave the episode a "B−" rating and wrote "'Ghosts' wasn't so much a step up or down from the pilot as it was a step sideways, largely maintaining that first episode's strength and weaknesses. Because we didn't need to spend so much time on an origin story (although dig that clunky expository dialogue!), we spent more time on the Person of the Week, the aforementioned teenage girl, Theresa. But by the end of the episode, we still knew barely anything about her. Last week introduced the idea that the SSNs the machine provides might be for potential victims or potential killers, but Theresa is on the side of the angels. Her father, mother, and brother were killed by a hitman a few years back, and Theresa herself was presumed dead; there's a brief tease at the beginning when Finch and Reese meet in the graveyard where the Whitakers were buried, and Reese says something about a ghost (sigh), but by and large, this is a straightforward, land-deal-gone-bad kind of story."

Ross Bonaime of Paste gave the episode a 6 out of 10 rating and wrote "Person of Interest does genuinely have interesting aspects to its story. But all those take place in flashbacks, while the show wants to spend a majority of its time in the present, which to put it simply, is pretty boring. If Person of Interest can focus on the mystery of the show, the build up to the meeting of Reese and Finch and their relationship, the show could go some great places. But as for right now, Person of Interest seems content in being not that interesting." Morgan Jeffery of Digital Spy wrote "Got to love the stylish Person of Interest title sequence introduced with this episode, featuring a moody voice-over from Michael Emerson. The flashbacks are a nice addition to the 'A' story this week - we get an intriguing glimpse into Finch's past and it'll be interesting to see how the story arc involving his deceased partner develops."
