= About Sunny =

- Directed by: Bryan Wizemann; Mike S. Ryan
- Screenplay by: Bryan Wizemann
- Produced by: Lauren Ambrose; Blythe Robertson; Mike S. Ryan
- Starring: Lauren Ambrose; Dylan Baker; Penelope Ann Miller; Audrey Scott
- Cinematography: Mark Schwartzbard
- Edited by: Michael Taylor
- Music by: Jeff Grace
- Distributed by: Oscilloscope
- Release dates: September 9, 2011 (Toronto); March 19, 2013 (United States)
- Running time: 103 minutes
- Country: United States
- Language: English

About Sunny (also titled Think of Me) is a 2011 American drama film directed by Bryan Wizemann and Mike S. Ryan and starring Lauren Ambrose, Dylan Baker and Penelope Ann Miller.

== Cast ==
- Lauren Ambrose as Angela
- Audrey Scott as Sunny
- Dylan Baker as Max
- Penelope Ann Miller as Louise
- David Conrad as Ted
- Adina Porter as Cheryl
- Craig Gray as Michael

== Reception ==
The film has an 83% rating on Rotten Tomatoes.
