= Paddy Croft =

American actress

Patricia Croft
- Born: July 1, 1923; Worthing, Sussex, England, United Kingdom
- Died: July 27, 2015 (aged 92)
- Occupation: Actress

Patricia "Paddy" Croft (July 1, 1923 – July 27, 2015) was an English born Irish-American actress of stage and screen.

== Biography and career ==
Croft was born in Worthing, West Sussex, England in 1923.

A character actress who usually played Irish roles on stage, in film and on television, she was affiliated with the Irish Repertory Theatre in New York City, most recently in 2005 as Madge in a revival of Brian Friel's Philadelphia, Here I Come. She also appeared in Hugh Leonard's Da, and often served as standby or understudy on Broadway in productions of Major Barbara, Night Must Fall, The Plough and the Stars, and The Killing of Sister George, sometimes assuming the roles upon the departure of the star for whom she was covering, the last such occasion being in 1999 in the revival of Night Must Fall, starring Matthew Broderick, when Croft succeeded the departing Judy Parfitt. Her last role on Broadway was in The Dead in 2000.

In 1973, she appeared in Crown Matrimonial receiving good notices for her performance as Mary, Princess Royal supporting Eileen Herlie's Queen Mary.

Croft also appeared on television, including on the long-running NBC series Law & Order and Law and Order: Special Victims Unit.

== Filmography ==
=== Film ===
Year	Title	Role	Notes
1966	Passages from James Joyce's Finnegans Wake	Celebrant	
1980	Just Tell Me What You Want	Berger's Secretary	
1984	The Beniker Gang	Mrs. O'Malley	
2001	Trigger Happy	Anna	
2012	What Maisie Knew	Mrs. Wix	

=== Television ===
Year	Title	Role	Notes
1959	Folio	Katya	Episode: "Ivanov"
1960	Startime	Nurse-secretary	Episode: "The Cocktail Party"
1977	Johnny I Hardly Knew Ye	Powers' Sister	Television film
1988	The Campbells	Alma	Episode: "The Runaway"
1995	Law & Order	Housekeeper	Episode: "Privileged"
1995	The Wright Verdicts	Mrs. Dillon	Episode: "The Eyes of God"
2001	Law & Order: SVU	Aunt Mary	Episode: "Manhunt"
2004	Law & Order: Criminal Intent	Alda Morse	Episode: "D.A.W."
