= Lauren Ambrose =

American actress (born 1978)

- Ambrose in 2026
- Born: February 20, 1978 (age 48)
- Occupations: Actress; singer
- Years active: 1990–present
- Spouse: Sam Handel (m. 2001)
- Children: 2

Lauren Ambrose (born February 20, 1978) is an American actress and singer. She initially gained recognition and critical acclaim for her starring role as Claire Fisher in the HBO drama series Six Feet Under (2001–2005), for which she was nominated for two Primetime Emmy Awards and won two Screen Actors Guild Awards. She went on to star as Jilly Kitzinger in the BBC One science fiction series Torchwood: Miracle Day (2011), Dorothy Turner in the Apple TV+ psychological horror series Servant (2019–2023), and as the adult version of Vanessa "Van" Palmer in the Showtime drama thriller series Yellowjackets (2023–2025).

Her film credits include In & Out (1997), Can't Hardly Wait (1998), Swimming (2000), Psycho Beach Party (2000), Where the Wild Things Are (2009), and The Other Woman (2009). Ambrose played the title role in Loving Leah, a 2009 Hallmark film. Other credits include About Sunny (2011), Sleepwalk with Me (2012), and Wanderlust (2012).

Ambrose's stage credits include Buried Child (2004), Awake and Sing! (2006), and Exit the King (2009). She portrayed the lead role of Eliza Doolittle in the 2018 Lincoln Center Theater revival of My Fair Lady on Broadway, for which she garnered a Tony Award nomination and a Grammy Award, as well as an Outer Critics Circle Award. She is lead singer of the ragtime band Lauren Ambrose and the Leisure Class.

== Early life ==
Lauren Ambrose was born on February 20, 1978. She is the daughter of Frank D'Ambruoso, a caterer, and Anne (née Wachtel), an interior designer. She is of Italian descent on her father's side, and German, English, and Irish on her mother's side. Ambrose attended Choate Rosemary Hall, Wilbur Cross High School, High School in the Community and the ACES Educational Center for the Arts in New Haven as part of the class of 1996. She is also a trained opera singer who studied voice and opera at the Boston University Tanglewood Institute in the summers of 1994 and 1995.

== Career ==
=== 1990–1998: Career beginnings ===
Ambrose began her career in New York theater, starring in the Off-Broadway play Soulful Scream of a Chosen Son at the Vineyard Theatre from August to September 1990. Her early career also included television appearances, most notably playing supporting guest roles in the NBC crime drama series Law & Order, and a feature guest role on the show in the 1998 episode "Damaged" as Valerie Maxwell, an intellectually disabled young woman raped by a group of popular high school students. Her first film role was as Vicky Rayburn in the comedy In & Out (1997). She went on to have a prominent role as Denise Fleming in the high school comedy film Can't Hardly Wait (1998).

=== 1999–2005: Breakthrough and Six Feet Under ===
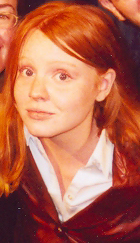
Ambrose in 2000

In 1999, Ambrose had a recurring role as Myra Wringler in five episodes of the Fox teen drama Party of Five. She played the ingenue lead, Florence "Chicklet" Forrest, in the horror comedy Psycho Beach Party (2000). The same year, she starred as Frankie Wheeler in the coming-of-age drama film Swimming.

Ambrose gained wider recognition and critical acclaim for her starring role as Claire Fisher in the HBO drama series Six Feet Under (2001–2005). For her performance, she was nominated for two Primetime Emmy Awards for Outstanding Supporting Actress in a Drama Series and a Teen Choice Award for Choice TV Drama Actress. She also won the Screen Actors Guild Award for Outstanding Performance by an Ensemble in a Drama Series twice, from five nominations as a part of the ensemble cast.

In 2004, she starred as Shelly in the Royal National Theatre production of the play Buried Child.

=== 2006–2017: Broadway debut ===
In 2006, Ambrose made her Broadway debut in the Lincoln Center Theater revival production of Awake and Sing! at the Belasco Theatre. She went on to appear in the drama films Diggers (2006) and Starting Out in the Evening (2007).

In 2007, she starred as Juliet in the Public Theater's Shakespeare in the Park performance of Romeo and Juliet at the Delacorte Theater in Central Park. She also appeared as Ophelia in the 2008 performance of Hamlet for Shakespeare in the Park.

In 2008, she had a starring role as Coco Tompkins in the Fox comedy series The Return of Jezebel James, which was created by Amy Sherman-Palladino. The series was cancelled after one season.

Ambrose returned to Broadway in the 2009 revival of Eugène Ionesco's Exit the King at the Ethel Barrymore Theatre, opposite Geoffrey Rush and Susan Sarandon. Also in 2009, she starred in numerous films, such as the comedy-dramas A Dog Year and Cold Souls, and the romance dramas The Other Woman and Loving Leah. Additionally, she provided the voice of the monster KW in Spike Jonze's fantasy drama film Where the Wild Things Are.

Ambrose is the lead singer of Lauren Ambrose and the Leisure Class, a ragtime dixieland jazz band formed in 2009. They have performed several times at Joe's Pub and charity events.

In 2011, Ambrose appeared in seven episodes of the BBC One science fiction series Torchwood: Miracle Day. She played Jilly Kitzinger, a "sweet-talking PR genius with a heart of stone who's just cornered the most important client of her career and maybe of all time". For her performance, she received a Saturn Award nomination for Best Supporting Actress on Television.

Ambrose produced and starred in the drama film About Sunny (2011), which premiered at the Toronto International Film Festival. For her performance, she was nominated for the Independent Spirit Award for Best Female Lead. In 2012, she appeared in the comedy films Sleepwalk with Me, Wanderlust, and Grassroots. She was set to play Fanny Brice in a 2012 Broadway revival of Funny Girl, directed by Bartlett Sher, but the production was indefinitely postponed due to financial concerns.

Ambrose made numerous TV appearances, including roles in the A&E miniseries Coma (2012), the Adult Swim animated series Robot Chicken (2013), the NBC crime drama series Law & Order: Special Victims Unit (2013), the Lifetime television film Deliverance Creek (2014), and the USA Network miniseries Dig (2015). From 2016 to 2018, she had a recurring role as Special Agent Liz Einstein in the Fox science fiction drama series The X-Files.

=== 2018–present: Broadway return and Servant ===
In March 2018, Ambrose began a leading role as Eliza Doolittle in the Broadway revival of My Fair Lady at the Vivian Beaumont Theatre, directed by Bartlett Sher. For her performance, she received critical acclaim and was nominated for the Tony Award for Best Actress in a Musical and the Grammy Award for Best Musical Theater Album. She also won the Outer Critics Circle Award for Outstanding Actress in a Musical.

In October 2018, Ambrose left My Fair Lady to take on the lead role as Dorothy Turner in the psychological horror series Servant, which was produced by M. Night Shyamalan and Tony Basgallop for Apple TV+. The series premiered in November 2019 and ended after four seasons in March 2023. For her performance in the series, she garnered a nomination for the Critics' Choice Super Award for Best Actress in a Horror Series.

Ambrose has also narrated various audiobooks, most recently The Maid by Nita Prose in 2022.

In 2023, Ambrose began starring in the Showtime drama thriller series Yellowjackets, portraying the adult version of the character Vanessa "Van" Palmer.

== Personal life ==
Ambrose has been married to professional writer Sam Handel since September 2001. They have two children.

== Acting credits ==
=== Film ===
Year	Title	Role	Notes
1997	In & Out	Vicky Rayburn	
1998	Can't Hardly Wait	Denise Fleming	
1998	Summertime's Calling Me	Tami	Short film
2000	Swimming	Frankie Wheeler	
2000	Psycho Beach Party	Florence "Chicklet" Forrest	
2004	Admissions	Evie Brighton	
2006	Diggers	Zoey	
2007	Starting Out in the Evening	Heather Wolfe	
2009	A Dog Year	Emma	
2009	Cold Souls	Stephanie	
2009	Where the Wild Things Are	KW (voice)	
2009	The Other Woman	Mindy	
2011	I'm Coming Over	Greta	Short film
2011	About Sunny	Angela	Also producer
2012	Sleepwalk with Me	Abby	
2012	Wanderlust	Almond Cohen	
2012	Grassroots	Emily Bowen	
2013	The River	Maria	Short film
2018	Joseph Pulitzer: Voice of the People	Kate Davis	
2024	Caddo Lake	Celeste	

Key
†	Denotes films that have not yet been released

=== Television ===
Year	Title	Role	Notes
1992	Law & Order	Jessica	Episode: "Skin Deep"
1993	Law & Order	Maureen McKinnon	Episode: "Pride and Joy"
1995	The State	Audience Member	Episode: "3.10"
1998	Law & Order	Valerie Maxwell	Episode: "Damaged"
1999	Party of Five	Myra Wringler	5 episodes
2001–2005	Six Feet Under	Claire Fisher	Main role
2008	The Return of Jezebel James	Coco Tompkins	Main role
2009	Loving Leah	Leah Lever	Television film
2011	Torchwood: Miracle Day	Jilly Kitzinger	7 episodes
2011	Weekends at Bellevue	Ellie Harlow	Pilot
2012	Coma	Susan Wheeler	2 episodes
2013	Robot Chicken	Anita Radcliffe / Natasha Fatale (voices)	Episode: "Papercut to Aorta"
2013	Law & Order: Special Victims Unit	Vanessa Mayer	2 episodes
2014	Deliverance Creek	Belle Gatlin Barlow	Television film
2015	Dig	Debbie Morgan	Main role
2015	Broad Squad	Eileen	Pilot
2016–2018	The X-Files	Special Agent Liz Einstein	3 episodes
2016	The Interestings	Jules Jacobson	Pilot
2017	Monsters of God	Cynthia Lancaster	Pilot
2019–2023	Servant	Dorothy Turner	Main role
2023–2025	Yellowjackets	Adult Vanessa "Van" Palmer	Main role (seasons 2–3)

=== Theater ===
Year	Title	Role	Venue	Ref.
2004	Buried Child	Shelly	Royal National Theatre, London	
2006	Awake and Sing!	Hennie Berger	Belasco Theatre, Broadway	
2007	Romeo and Juliet	Juliet	Delacorte Theater, New York	
2008	Hamlet	Ophelia	Delacorte Theater, New York	
2009	Exit the King	Queen Marie	Ethel Barrymore Theatre, Broadway	
2018	My Fair Lady	Eliza Doolittle	Vivian Beaumont Theater, Broadway	
2026	The Unbelievers	Miriam	New York City Center, Off-Broadway	

=== Video games ===
Year	Title	Voice role	Notes
2007	The Darkness	Jenny Romano	

== Awards and nominations ==
List of awards and nominations received by Lauren Ambrose
Year	Association	Category	Work	Result	Ref.
2002	Primetime Emmy Awards	Outstanding Supporting Actress in a Drama Series	Six Feet Under	Nominated	
2002	Actor Awards	Outstanding Performance by an Ensemble in a Drama Series	Six Feet Under	Nominated	
2002	Teen Choice Awards	Choice TV Drama Actress	Six Feet Under	Nominated	
2003	Primetime Emmy Awards	Outstanding Supporting Actress in a Drama Series	Six Feet Under	Nominated	
2003	Actor Awards	Outstanding Performance by an Ensemble in a Drama Series	Six Feet Under	Won	
2004	Actor Awards	Outstanding Performance by an Ensemble in a Drama Series	Six Feet Under	Won	
2005	Actor Awards	Outstanding Performance by an Ensemble in a Drama Series	Six Feet Under	Nominated	
2006	Actor Awards	Outstanding Performance by an Ensemble in a Drama Series	Six Feet Under	Nominated	
2009	Satellite Awards	Best Actress – Miniseries or Television Film	Loving Leah	Nominated	
2012	Independent Spirit Awards	Best Female Lead	Think of Me	Nominated	
2012	Saturn Awards	Best Supporting Actress on Television	Torchwood: Miracle Day	Nominated	
2018	Tony Award	Best Actress in a Musical	My Fair Lady	Nominated	
2018	Drama League Award	Distinguished Performance	My Fair Lady	Nominated	
2018	Outer Critics Circle Award	Outstanding Actress in a Musical	My Fair Lady	Won	
2019	Grammy Award	Best Musical Theater Album	My Fair Lady	Nominated	
2021	SEC Awards	Best Actress in a Thriller Series	Servant	Nominated	
2022	Critics' Choice Super Award	Best Actress in a Horror Series	Servant	Nominated	
2023	Hollywood Critics Association TV Awards	Best Supporting Actress in a Broadcast Network or Cable Drama Series	Yellowjackets	Nominated	
