= Everlasting (film) =

- Film poster
- Directed by: Anthony Stabley
- Written by: Anthony Stabley
- Produced by: Shannon Makhanian; Anthony Stabley
- Starring: Valentina de Angelis; Adam David; Elisabeth Röhm; Michael Massee; Pat Healy; Bai Ling; Robert LaSardo
- Cinematography: Jon Bickford
- Edited by: Bryan Colvin; Brad McLaughlin
- Music by: Scott Gordon; David Levita
- Production company: Super Grande Films
- Distributed by: Indie Rights
- Release dates: November 11, 2015 (Crystal Palace); October 1, 2016
- Running time: 85 minutes
- Country: United States
- Language: English

Everlasting is a 2015 suspense film written and directed by Anthony Stabley. The film stars Valentina de Angelis and Adam David and features Elisabeth Röhm, Michael Massee, Pat Healy, Bai Ling and Robert LaSardo. Everlasting had its world premiere at the Crystal Palace International Film Festival in London where it was Nominated Best Feature. The U.S. premiere took place in the Carolina Theater at the 17th Annual Nevermore Film Festival where it was Winner of the Best Feature. It was also an official selection of Panic Fest in Kansas City. Everlasting was released on Amazon Prime via Distributor Indie Rights on October 1, 2016.

== Plot ==
Senior Matt Ortega's original idea was to edit personal home footage for a media class project, so that he could create a tribute video in memory of his girlfriend Jessie. The year prior, Jessie dropped out of Ridge Crest H.S. in Colorado and ran off to L.A. with dreams in her heart. Six months later, her nude body was found strewn along Topanga Canyon; she had been strangled and beaten. Months passed, and with no clues or witnesses, law enforcement interest begins to wane. So Matt creates an Internet blog that invites readers to share any information that they might have about the murder. Within two weeks after the sites' launching, a plain paper packet containing a Mini DV arrives at Matt's home that shows Jessie being murdered. The packet also contains cryptic data that may reveal the identity of the killer. Distrustful of the legal system, Matt decides to circumvent the police and decides to drive back to Los Angeles alone as he documents the process of confronting Jessie's murderer.

== Cast ==
- Valentina de Angelis as Jessie
- Adam David as Matt
- Elisabeth Röhm as Jessie's mom
- Michael Massee as Leor
- Pat Healy as Henrique
- Bai Ling as Cristiane
- Robert LaSardo as Rocky
- Cortney Palm as Kami
- Guinevere Turner as Irena
- Molly Tarlov as Liz
- Shayla Beesley as Wren
- Yareli Arizmendi as Matt's mom

== Music ==
Composers Scott Gordon and David Levita wrote the majority of the original score. Music Supervisor Sean Fernald was instrumental in securing songs by Cold Cave and Crystal Castles.

== Reception ==
On review aggregator website Rotten Tomatoes, the film has an approval rating of 100 percent based on 11 critics, with an average rating of 7.2/10. Film Threat gave the film five stars and noted, "Honest portrayals of teenagers can be a bit hard to come by, but Everlasting is a triumph on all levels." Screen Anarchy described the film as "a time-leaping, mixed-media kaleidoscopic vision of a young Lynchian 'woman in trouble', caught between free agency and victimhood - under the Hollywood sign." Starburst Magazine (UK) wrote, "Stabley's film is a rare breed; tragically engaging yet knife-edge terrifying. It’s impeccably acted, particularly by the two leads, and even with the extreme circumstances, the audience can’t help but identify with them."

== Accolades ==
- 2015 Crystal Palace International Film Festival - Nominated - Best Feature
- 2016 Nevermore Film Festival - Winner - Best Feature
