= Valentina de Angelis =

American actress

- Born: June 12, 1989 (age 37); Manhattan, New York, U.S.
- Other names: Valentina DeAngelis; Valentina Deangelis
- Occupation: Actress
- Years active: 2003–present

Valentina de Angelis (born June 12, 1989) is an American actress. She is perhaps best known for her role as Young Bo in the 2003 film Off the Map, her first major acting role. In 2009, she had a recurring role as Carmen Fortier in the series Gossip Girl. The following year, she appeared in the soap opera As the World Turns as Faith Snyder.

== Life and career ==
Born in Manhattan, de Angelis began her professional career as a child model. She is an alum of Professional Children's School.

In 2003, de Angelis had her first major acting role as Young Bo in the Campbell Scott-directed film Off the Map co-starring with Sam Elliott and Joan Allen.

She has had number of acting roles in television series filmed in New York City area. Those series include Love Monkey, Law & Order, CSI: NY, Blue Bloods and Person of Interest. Along with having recurring roles in Gossip Girl and As the World Turns in 2009 and 2010, respectively. In 2009, she made a guest appearance in CSI: Crime Scene Investigation.

Her other film credits include Bereavement, Camp Hope (also known as Camp Hell) and It's Kind of a Funny Story. All of which were released in 2010.

She also appeared in the role of Jenna in the film The Midnight Game which was released on August 12, 2014, by Anchor Bay Entertainment.

== Filmography ==
Year	Title	Role	Notes
2003	Off the Map	Young Bo	
2005	Liminality	Jenni	Short film
2006	Love Monkey	Girl #1	Episode: "Coming Out"
2005–2008	Law & Order	Katie Conlan / Rebecca Rossi	Episodes: "Criminal Law", "Darkness"
2008	CSI: NY (video game)	Libby Drake	Legacy Interactive video game
2009	CSI: Crime Scene Investigation	Rio	Episode: "Disarmed and Dangerous"
2009	Gossip Girl	Carmen Fortier	Recurring role, 5 episodes
2010	Bereavement	Melissa	
2010	Camp Hope	Melissa	
2010	As the World Turns	Faith Snyder	Recurring role, 40 episodes
2010	It's Kind of a Funny Story	Jenna (uncredited)	
2011	Blue Bloods	Nikolina	Episode: "Mercy"
2011	Person of Interest	Theresa Whitaker	Episode: "Ghosts"
2011	CSI: NY	Libby Drake	Episode: "Crushed"
2013	The Midnight Game	Jenna	
2013	Deep Dark Canyon (film)	Jamie	
2016	Everlasting	Jessie	
