= Bau: Artist at War =

2024 biographical film

Bau, Artist at War
- Official poster
- Directed by: Sean McNamara
- Written by: Deborah Smerecnik; Ronald Bass; Sonia Kifferstein
- Produced by: David Brookwell; Marc Griffith; Michelle P. Griffith; Sean McNamara; Deborah Smerecnik
- Starring: Emile Hirsch; Inbar Lavi; Josh Zuckerman; Yan Tual; Eugene Lipinski; Josh Blacker; Edward Foy; Chris Cope; Adam Tsekhman
- Cinematography: Shawn Seifert
- Edited by: Gregory Hobson; Tony Dean Smith
- Music by: John Coda
- Production companies: Brookwell McNamara Entertainment; Busy Bee Film Production; Iron Image
- Distributed by: Republic Pictures; ShowBiz Direct
- Release dates: February 20, 2024 (BRJFF); September 26, 2025 (theatrical)
- Running time: 130 minutes
- Country: United States
- Language: English

Bau, Artist at War is a 2024 American biographical romance drama film directed by Sean McNamara and starring Emile Hirsch as Holocaust survivor Joseph Bau and Inbar Lavi as his wife Rebecca. The film also stars Josh Zuckerman, Yan Tual, Eugene Lipinski, Josh Blacker, Edward Foy, Chris Cope and Adam Tsekhman, and chronicles Bau's imprisonment in a Kraków-Płaszów concentration camp during World War II, and his subsequent relationship and wedding with Rebecca.

Bau premiered at the Boca Raton Jewish Film Festival on February 20, 2024, and received a limited theatrical release from ShowBiz Direct on September 26, 2025.

== Plot ==
The film details the life of Polish-born Israeli artist Joseph Bau, who was imprisoned in the Kraków-Płaszów concentration camp during World War II from 1942 to 1945. During his imprisonment, he started a relationship with fellow prisoner Rebecca, who he married in 1943 in the women's barracks of Płaszów.

== Cast ==
- Emile Hirsch as Joseph Bau
- Inbar Lavi as Rebecca Tennenbaum
- Yan Tual as Franz Gruen
- Adam Tsekhman as Itzhak Stern
- Edward Foy as Oskar Schindler
- Chris Cope as Mietek Pemper
- Josh Blacker as Kommendant Goeth
- Josh Zuckerman as Michael
- Eugene Lipinski as Abraham Bau
- Dalias Blake as Aleksy
- Pam Kearns as Cyla
- Tori Griffith as Dyta
- Michael Benyaer as Saul

== Production ==
In March 2023, Emile Hirsch, Inbar Lavi and Yan Tual were cast in Bau: Artist at War. A documentary based on Joseph Bau's life was also announced to be in production, as it was intended to be a companion piece to Artist at War.

== Release ==
Bau, Artist at War premiered at the Boca Raton Jewish Film Festival on February 20, 2024.

In November 2024, ShowBiz Direct set Bau, Artist at War for a wide theatrical release on January 24, 2025, with Republic Pictures distributing the film internationally. However, the film's release date was later pushed back to September 26, 2025.

== Reception ==
On Film Threat, Bobby LePire rated it 8.5/10, writing in his review consensus section, "excellent from beginning to end."
