= House of Dust (film) =

- Teaser poster
- Directed by: A.D. Calvo
- Screenplay by: Nevada Grey & Alyssa Alexandria
- Story by: A.D. Calvo
- Produced by: A.D. Calvo; Todd Slater
- Starring: Inbar Lavi; Steven Grayhm; Eddie Hassell; Holland Roden; John Lee Ames; Stephen Spinella
- Cinematography: Christo Bakalov
- Production company: Budderfly / Goodnight Film
- Distributed by: Anchor Bay Entertainment
- Release date: May 20, 2014 (United States)
- Running time: 90 minutes
- Country: United States
- Language: English

House of Dust is a 2014 supernatural thriller film directed by A.D. Calvo. The movie had its world premiere on May 20, 2014, and focuses on a group of college students that become possessed by the ghosts of former mental patients. Filming took place in Willimantic, Connecticut and Mansfield, Connecticut at the Mansfield Training School and Hospital, University of Connecticut, and Eastern Connecticut State University during the summer of 2011.

== Plot ==
In 1951, having already killed OCD patient Billy Brown at the Redding House Asylum, a psychiatrist experiments on simple-minded inmate Melvin Veman and sociopath Levius Laitura. With Levius still alive, the psychiatrist has his orderlies put the bodies of all three men inside the crematorium to burn them.

50 years later Camden College student Dylan tells his girlfriend Gabby and his roommate Kolt about the now abandoned asylum's haunted history. New student Emma moves in as Gabby's roommate and Kolt takes a liking to her. However, fellow students Allyson, Christine and Blythe do not. Dylan, Kolt, Gabby and Emma break into Redding House after a party to look around despite a warning from campus security guard Clyde. Emma has strange experiences while exploring on her own. The other three knock over a container of cremated ashes and inhale the dust of the three men burned there in 1951.

A recovering psychiatric patient herself, Emma begins experiencing haunting visions upon returning to the dorm. The behavior of the other three students gradually changes as Billy possesses Dylan, Melvin inhabits Gabby and Levius takes control of Kolt's body. Allyson is killed by someone unseen while doing laundry. Christine is later killed while taking her dog outside. Suspecting that the disappearances and the odd behaviors are related to the asylum, Emma tries to go back to Redding House, but Clyde prevents her from going inside. With Levius in full control of his actions, Kolt attacks Emma. Emma eventually flees into the asylum and confirms her suspicions when she examines patient records and finds the empty urn knocked over by the others. Emma then finds the dead bodies of Allyson, Christine and Blythe.

Kolt captures Emma, but Dylan knocks him unconscious and also knocks Emma out as well and locks both Kolt and Gabby in the crematorium. Emma recovers and frees Kolt and Gabby from the fire, which releases everyone from their possessions. Dylan coughs up Billy's spirit as well. The four students escape Redding House with Clyde's assistance. The crematorium dust goes through the chimney and into the air, ultimately possessing a little boy playing in the park with the other children nearby.

== Cast ==
- Inbar Lavi as Emma
- Steven Grayhm as Kolt
- Eddie Hassell as Dylan
- Holland Roden as Gabby
- John Lee Ames as Levius Laitura
- Peyton Clarkson as Melvin Veman
- Michael Goodin as Billy Brown
- Stephen Spinella as Psychiatrist
- Justin James Lang as Clyde
- Alesandra Assante as Allyson
- Joy Lauren as Blythe
- Nicole Travolta as Christine
- Anthony Scarpone-Lambert as Boy

== Reception ==
HorrorNews.net panned House of Dust, praising the movie's cast while stating that the movie "didn’t bring anything new to the table and was just lackluster and forgettable overall". DVD Verdict gave a mixed review and commented that while the movie was "no classic", that "A.D. Calvo directs the action well and gets good performances from actors lacking much experience" and that it would appeal best to fans of independent horror or films set in mental institutions.
