= Stephen Spinella =

American actor (born 1956)

- Born: October 11, 1956 (age 69); Naples, Italy
- Education: University of Arizona (BA); New York University (MFA)
- Occupation: Actor
- Years active: 1993–present
- Awards: Tony Award for Best Featured Actor in a Play (1993); Tony Award for Best Leading Actor in a Play (1994)

Stephen Spinella (born October 11, 1956) is an American actor. He originated the role of Prior Walter in the original Broadway production of Angels in America, winning the 1993 Tony Award for Best Featured Actor in a Play and the 1994 Tony Award for Best Leading Actor in a Play.

== Life and career ==
Spinella was born in Naples, Italy, to a father who was an American naval airplane mechanic. He grew up in Glendale, Arizona, and graduated from the University of Arizona with a degree in drama. He also attended NYU's Tisch School of the Arts' Graduate Acting Program, graduating in 1982.

Spinella won consecutive Tony Awards for Best Featured Actor in a Play and Best Leading Actor in a Play for his performance as Prior Walter in Angels in America: Millennium Approaches and Angels in America: Perestroika in 1993 and 1994, respectively. He was also nominated for Best Featured Actor in a Musical in 2000 for James Joyce's The Dead.

=== Personal life ===
Spinella is gay.

== Acting credits ==
=== Film ===
Year	Title	Role	Notes
1995	Tarantella	Frank	
1995	Virtuosity	Dr. Darrel Lindenmeyer	
1996	Faithful	Young Man at Rolls	
1997	Love! Valour! Compassion!	Perry Sellars	
1997	David Searching	Hummus Guy	
1997	The Jackal	Douglas	
1998	Great Expectations	Carter Macleish	
1998	The Unknown Cyclist	Doug Stein	
1998	Out of the Past	Michael Wigglesworth (voice)	
1999	Ravenous	Knox	
1999	Cradle Will Rock	Donald O'Hara	
2001	Bubble Boy	Chicken Man	
2004	Connie and Carla	Robert/Peaches	
2004	House of D	Ticket Seller	
2007	And Then Came Love	Stuart	
2008	Stone & Ed	Concierge	
2008	Milk	Rick Stokes	
2010	Rubber	Lieutenant Chad	
2012	Lincoln	Congressman Asa Vintner Litton	
2012	House of Dust	Psychiatrist	
2016	The Lennon Report	Dr. Richard Marks	
2018	Can You Ever Forgive Me?	Paul	
2019	Windows on the World	Albert	
2019	Bad Education	Thomas "Tom" Tuggiero	

=== Television ===
Year	Title	Role	Notes
1993	And the Band Played On	Brandy Alexander	Television film
1997	What the Deaf Man Heard	Percy	Television film
2000	Law & Order	Andy Polone	Episode: "High & Low"
2001–2002	The Education of Max Bickford	Rex Pinsker	10 episodes
2002–2005	Alias	Mr. Kishell / Boyd Harkin	3 episodes
2002	Ed	Bob McCarthy	Episode: "Ends and Means"
2003	Our Town	Simon Stimson	Television film
2003	Frasier	Randall Schoonover	Episode: "Sea Bee Jeebies"
2004	Without a Trace	Joel Kemper	Episode: "Shadows"
2004	Huff	Mr. Heard	2 episodes
2005	Everwood	Father Patrick	Episode: "Pieces of Me"
2005	Will & Grace	Bret	Episode: "Love Is in the Airplane"
2006	Grey's Anatomy	Malar Pascowitz	Episode: "Begin the Begin"
2006	24	Miles Papazian	10 episodes
2006	Nip/Tuck	Dr. Capler	Episode: "Burt Landau"
2006	Heroes	Oliver Dennison	Episode: "Nothing to Hide"
2007	Law & Order: Special Victims Unit	Morgan	Episode: "Alternate"
2008	ER	Henry Lotery	Episode: "Age of Innocence"
2008–2009	Desperate Housewives	Dr. Heller	4 episodes
2009	Big Love	Eric	Episode: "On Trial"
2010	Numbers	Hans Stollbach	Episode: "And the Winner Is..."
2010	The Mentalist	ADA Marc Odenthal	Episode: "Blood Money"
2012	Made in Jersey	Judge Ronald Winston	Episode: "The Farm"
2013–2016	Royal Pains	Russell Berger	12 episodes
2014	The Normal Heart	Sanford	Television film
2015	Code Black	Ted	Episode: "You Are the Heart"
2015	The Knick	A.D. Elkins	4 episodes
2018	Elementary	Professor Merrick Hausmann	Episode: "The Adventure of the Ersatz Sobekneferu"
2019	The Blacklist	Jordan Loving	Episode: "Minister D (No. 99)"
2019	Tales of the City	Chris	Episode: "The Price of Oil"
2020	Almost Family		2 episodes
2021	New Amsterdam	Howie Cournemeyer	Episode: "The Legend of Howie Cournemeyer"
2022	The Gilded Age	Julius Cuyper	Episode: "Let the Tournament Begin"
2022	Bull	Garrett Sinclair	Episode: "Dark Horse"
2023	City on Fire	Dr. Altschul	Episode: "We Have Met the Enemy, and He Is Us"
2026	Best Medicine	Greg Garrison	

=== Theater ===
Year	Title	Role	Notes
1985	A Bright Room Called Day	Baz	Theatre 22; workshop production directed by Tony Kushner
1988	L'Illusion	The Amanuensis	Perry Street Theatre
1993–1994	Angels in America: Millennium Approaches	Prior Walter/Man in Park	Walter Kerr Theatre
1993–1994	Angels in America: Perestroika	Prior Walter	Walter Kerr Theatre
1994	Love! Valour! Compassion!	Perry Sellars	New York City Center
1995	Troilus and Cressida	Pandarus	Delacorte Theater
1997	A Question of Mercy	Thomas	New York Theatre Workshop
1997–1998	A View from the Bridge	Alfieri	Criterion Center Stage Right
1998–1999	Electra	Servant to Orestes	Ethel Barrymore Theatre
1999	James Joyce's The Dead	Freddy Malins	Playwrights Horizons
2000	James Joyce's The Dead	Freddy Malins	Belasco Theatre
2001	The Seagull	Medvedenko	Delacorte Theater
2002	Elle	Usher	Zipper Theatre
2002–2003	Our Town	Simon Stimson	Booth Theatre
2004	Svejk	Svejk	The Duke on 42nd Street
2006–2007	Spring Awakening	Adult Men	Eugene O'Neill Theatre
2009	The Intelligent Homosexual's Guide to Capitalism and Socialism with a Key to the Scriptures	Pill	Guthrie Theater
2010	An Iliad	The Poet	McCarter Theatre
2011	The Intelligent Homosexual's Guide to Capitalism and Socialism with a Key to the Scriptures	Pill	The Public Theater
2012	An Iliad	The Poet	New York Theatre Workshop
2012	As You Like It	Jaques	Delacorte Theater
2012	Volpone	Volpone	Lucille Lortel Theatre
2014	The Velocity of Autumn	Chris	Booth Theatre
2014	A Man's a Man	Bloody Five	Classic Stage Company
2015	Hamlet	Polonius	Classic Stage Company
2016	Coriolanus	Sicinius Velutus	Barrow Street Theatre
2018	Angels in America	Roy Cohn	Berkeley Repertory Theatre
2019–2026	Harry Potter and the Cursed Child	Vernon Dursley/Severus Snape/Lord Voldemort	Lyric Theatre
2026	Jerome	Con	Playwrights Horizons

== See also ==
- List of people from Harlem
