= Erin Wilhelmi =

American actress

- Born: Louisville, Kentucky, U.S.
- Education: University of Evansville (BFA)
- Website: erinwilhelmi.com

Erin Wilhelmi is an American actress. She is known for her role as Alice in The Perks of Being a Wallflower, and as Mayella in Aaron Sorkin's stage adaptation of To Kill a Mockingbird.

== Filmography ==
=== Film ===
Year	Title	Role	Notes
2012	The Perks of Being a Wallflower	Alice	
2012	Disconnect	Tracy	
2013	The English Teacher	Joni Gerber	
2014	All Relative	Liz	
2014	Jamie Marks Is Dead	Susan	
2016	Sweet, Sweet Lonely Girl	Adele	
2018	Unsane	Hayley	
2022	Baby Ruby	—	Uncredited

=== Television ===
Year	Title	Role	Notes
2012	Gossip Girl	Mini Minion	Episode: "High Infidelity"
2014–2015	The Knick	Lottie	6 episodes
2014	Taxi Brooklyn	Ellie Wilson	Episode: "Ambush"
2015	Eye Candy	Erika	Episode: "ICU"
2018	Law & Order: Special Victims Unit	Mariel McLaughlin	Episode: "Pathological"
2018	Better Call Saul	Nikki	Episode: "Coushatta"
2020	Monsterland	Julie White	Episode: "New Orleans, Louisiana"
2020–2022	The Accidental Wolf	—	9 episodes
2022–present	The Gilded Age	Adelheid Weber	13 episodes

== Stage ==
Year	Title	Role	Venue	Ref.
2013	The Great God Pan	Joelle	Playwrights Horizons	
2013	Core Values	Eliot	Ars Nova Theater	
2014	The Great Immensity	Julie	The Public Theater	
2014	American Hero	Sheri	Second Stage Theatre	
2016	The Crucible	Mercy Lewis	Walter Kerr Theatre	
2017	A Doll's House, Part 2	Emmy Helmer	John Golden Theatre	
2018	To Kill a Mockingbird	Mayella Ewell	Shubert Theatre	

== Awards and nominations ==
Year	Award	Category	Nominated work	Result	Ref.
2012	San Diego Film Critics Society Awards	Best Ensemble Performance	The Perks of Being a Wallflower	Won	
2023	Screen Actors Guild Awards	Outstanding Performance by an Ensemble in a Drama Series	The Gilded Age	Pending	
