= Susan Kellermann =

American actress

- Education: Randolph-Macon Woman’s College (BA)
- Occupation: Actress
- Years active: 1977–2016

Susan Kellermann is an American actress.

== Education ==
Kellermann graduated from Randolph College with a Bachelor of Arts degree in English literature. She also studied acting at the Neighborhood Playhouse School of the Theatre with Sanford Meisner.

== Career ==
She made her television debut in episodes of Starsky and Hutch (1975) and Laverne & Shirley (1976). She went on to appear in many films, including Beetlejuice (1988), Elvira, Mistress of The Dark (1988), Death Becomes Her (1992) Last Holiday (2006), and Sweet, Sweet Lonely Girl (2016). She also appeared in three episodes of Taxi as Greta Gravas, mother of the character Latka.

She made her Broadway debut in 1979 in the play Last Licks for which she received a Theatre World Award.

== Filmography ==
=== Film ===
Year	Title	Role	Notes
1980	Where the Buffalo Roam	Waitress	
1980	Oh! Heavenly Dog	German Clerk	
1987	The Secret of My Success	Maureen	
1987	Planes, Trains and Automobiles	Waitress	
1988	The Couch Trip	Woman on Bus	
1988	Beetlejuice	Grace	
1988	Elvira: Mistress of the Dark	Patty	
1991	The Marrying Man	Bobbie	
1992	Death Becomes Her	Second Doctor	
1993	Heart and Souls	Noelle	
1997	The Devil's Advocate	Joyce Rensaleer	
1998	Just One Time	Anthony's Mom / Nava Hannibal	
1999	Swallows	Mimi	
2000	Boys and Girls	Therapist	
2005	Nomad: The Warrior	Babooshka	
2006	Last Holiday	Gunther	
2011	In the Family	Marge Hawks	
2016	Sweet, Sweet Lonely Girl	Dora	

=== Television ===
Year	Title	Role	Notes
1977	Mary Hartman, Mary Hartman	Matron	Episode #1.25
1978	Starsky & Hutch	Mary / Monique	2 episodes
1979	Laverne & Shirley	Bambi	Episode: "Fat City Holiday"
1979–1981	Taxi	Greta Gravas	3 episodes
1981	Another World	Beryl	Episode #1.4307
1982	The Wild Women of Chastity Gulch	Betsy	Television film
1983	Remington Steele	Janet Kimmell	Episode: "Hearts of Steele"
1983	Dixie: Changing Habits	Sister John the Baptist	Television film
1983	The Fighter	Monty	Television film
1983	Knight Rider	Nurse Langly	Episode: "Knightmares"
1984	The Jeffersons	Mary Husar	Episode: 10x15 "Trading Places"
1984	Hill Street Blues	Eva	Episode: "Eva's Brawn"
1984	At Your Service	Susan Ottinger	Television film
1984	Partners in Crime	Melody Cronyn	Episode: "Pilot"
1985	Cagney & Lacey	Helen Neuwirth	Episode: "Who Says It's Fair: Part 2"
1985	Hail to the Chief	Madame Zolotov	Episode: "Pilot"
1986	L.A. Law	Ms. Kaylins	Episode: "El Sid"
1987	Perfect Strangers	Marsha Manning	Episode: "Get a Job"
1987	Down and Out in Beverly Hills	Duchess	Episode: "Jerry's Mission"
1988	Simon & Simon	'Bad Betty' Delvecchio	Episode: "Bad Betty"
1988	I Saw What You Did	Gym Teacher	Television film
1988	The Bronx Zoo	Rose	Episode: "On the Land, on the Sea and in the Halls"
1989	Dear John	Blomlika	Episode: "Ralph's Second Chance"
1990	Doctor Doctor	The Gypsy	Episode: "Doctors and Other Strangers"
1990	A Family for Joe	Peggy	Episode: "A Little Romance"
1990	How to Murder a Millionaire	Head Maid	Television film
1991	Babes	Sloane	Episode: "The House of Gilbert"
1992	In Sickness and in Health	Administrator	Television film
1992	Murder, She Wrote	Sergeant Martha Redstone	Episode: "The Dead File"
1994	Murphy Brown	Mrs. Wallace	Episode: "Brown vs. the Board of Education"
2000	Law & Order	Jeannie Stokes	Episode: "Stiff"
2000–2001	Courage the Cowardly Dog	Voice	13 episodes
2003	Law & Order: SVU	Mrs. Hedges	Episode: "Appearances"
2004	Monk	Maria Disher	Episode: "Mr. Monk Gets Married"
