= Spring Break Zombie Massacre =

- Directed by: Bobby Carnevale
- Written by: Sam Suchmann; Mattie Zufelt
- Produced by: Jesse Suchmann
- Starring: Sam Suchmann; Mattie Zufelt
- Edited by: Tim Forster
- Release date: July 7, 2016
- Running time: 45 minutes
- Country: United States
- Language: English

Spring Break Zombie Massacre is a 2016 American horror short film directed by Bobby Carnevale. Sam Suchmann and Mattie Zufelt star as half-brothers who must stop Satan from ruining their spring break.

== Premise ==
After failing to steal their magic powers, Satan kills the mothers of two half-brothers shortly after they are born. Twenty years later, the brothers must use their powers to stop Satan and his zombie minions from ruining their spring break.

== Cast ==
- Sam Suchmann as Sam
- Mattie Zufelt as Mattie
- Madeline Brumby as Nikki
- Justine S Harrison as Elizabeth/Mrs. Fox
- Allison Maier as A. J.
- Joseph Turner as Frakenzombie
- Johnny Collins as the Devil

Pauly D appears in a cameo near the end.

== Production ==
Sam Suchmann and Mattie Zufelt, both of whom have Down syndrome, met at the Special Olympics. Sam's older brother, Jesse, said their families initially viewed the friends' enthusiasm for a film as a phase the two would eventually outgrow. When they did not, Jesse investigated further, finding that they had written a notebook full of scenes, including storyboards. Jesse initially considered shooting the film do-it-yourself style but was impressed enough with their work that he took the film to Kickstarter, where it received $68,000 in funding. Taking the position of producer, Jesse brought in director Bobby Carnevale, whom he had been friends with in high school. Filming took place over 16 days in Providence, Rhode Island. The Kickstarter campaign and resulting publicity resulted in increased interest in the film, and industry veterans like Farrelly brothers visited the set. Casting involved diverse groups of people. Some of the extras are friends on the autism spectrum or with Downs, and some auditioned after discovering the project. Other talent came from Atlanta, where director Carnevale had contacts. Pauly D, a hero to Mattie, accepted a cameo role after the friends insisted that he be approached. Jesse said the film was Sam and Mattie's project, and they were not simply helped by a professional film crew. A sequel is planned.

== Release ==
Spring Break Zombie Massacre premiered on July 7, 2016, in Providence, Rhode Island. It later played at the Telluride Film Festival in October 2016.

== Reception ==
Steve Hartman of CBS News called it "really gross in parts, terribly offensive in others and completely ludicrous throughout", concluding that it is a future cult film. In 2016, due to the success of the movie, Suchmann and Zufelt were guests on Conan. O'Brien brought a chocolate fountain out for them to celebrate their achievement. Pauly D told People that the pair were impressive to work with and referred to them as "my boys". Oscar-winning filmmaker Peter Farrelly stated, “I don’t think I’ve ever smiled more while watching a movie in my life."

== Sam & Mattie Make a Zombie Movie ==
In 2021, Apple TV released Sam and Mattie Make a Zombie Movie, a documentary following Suchmann and Zufelt's journey while making Spring Break Zombie Massacre. The documentary received 4.5 stars on Dread Central. Fox News wrote, "the hope is that the film inspires others to put neurodivergent minds in charge of the creative process."
