= A. D. Calvo =

American film director

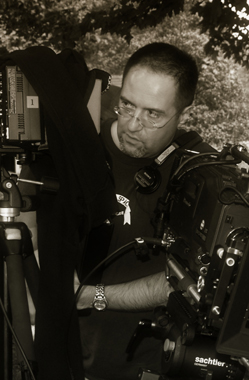
- Calvo in 2007
- Born: Alejandro Daniel Calvo; October 9, 1967 (age 58); Buenos Aires, Argentina
- Occupations: Director, producer, writer

Alejandro Daniel Calvo (born October 9, 1967, in Buenos Aires) is an Argentine-born producer, writer, and director.

== Biography ==
Calvo was born in Buenos Aires and moved to Rio de Janeiro, Brazil, when he was four. In 1974, his family relocated to the United States. Calvo's early filmmaking and screenwriting efforts gained the praise and support of Oscar-nominated producers Howard and Karen Baldwin, and Grammy-winning musician Michael Bolton. All three were executive producers on his feature film debut, The Other Side of the Tracks, a romantic thriller shot in Connecticut during the summer of 2007 and picked up by Showtime. Calvo has since gone on to produce and direct five other features: The Melancholy Fantastic, House of Dust, The Midnight Game, The Missing Girl (official selection of the 2015 Toronto International Film Festival), and Sweet, Sweet Lonely Girl.

Prior to filmmaking, Calvo worked in the software industry.

== Filmography ==
=== As director ===
- Sweet, Sweet Lonely Girl (2016)
- The Missing Girl (2015)
- House of Dust (2014)
- The Midnight Game (2013)
- The Melancholy Fantastic (2011) (2016, re-released in the UK as Doll in the Dark)
- The Other Side of the Tracks (2008)

==== Documentary ====
- La Danse Macabre: Portrait of a Serial Sculptor (2007)
- Castro in Central Park (short documentary) (2006)
- Hillary's Bust (short documentary) (2006)
- The Several Severed Heads of Daniel Edwards (short documentary) (2005)

==== Short ====
- Nine Lives: A Buddhist Ghost Story (short film) (2006)
- Hypnogothic (short film) (2005)
- Sitter (short film) (2004)

==== Music videos ====
- Aimee Mann - "The King of the Jailhouse" (music video) (2007)
- Pink Floyd - "Wish You Were Here" (music video) (2004)
