= The Missing Girl (film) =

2015 film

- Film poster
- Directed by: A.D. Calvo
- Written by: A.D. Calvo
- Produced by: Mike S. Ryan
- Starring: Robert Longstreet; Alexia Rasmussen; Eric Ladin; Thomas Jay Ryan; Shirley Knight; Kevin Corrigan; Sonja Sohn
- Release date: September 13, 2015 (TIFF)
- Running time: 89 minutes
- Country: United States
- Language: English

The Missing Girl is a 2015 American drama film directed by A.D. Calvo. It was shown in the Vanguard section of the 2015 Toronto International Film Festival.

== Synopsis ==
The film follows Mort, a comic book store owner that hires Ellen, a graphic novel artist trying to get her big break in the world of professional comics.

== Cast ==
- Robert Longstreet as Mort Colvins
- Alexia Rasmussen as Ellen Peter
- Eric Ladin as Skippy
- Thomas Jay Ryan as Stan Colvins
- Shirley Knight as Mrs. Colvins
- Kevin Corrigan as Curly
- Sonja Sohn as Franny
- Adam David Thompson as J. Lee
- Alesandra Assante as Madeline
- Ralph Rodriguez as Gumby

== Reception ==
Brian Tallerico of RogerEbert.com compared the film favorably to the 2001 film Ghost World and stated that it was "awkwardly stylized (sometimes too much), but the leads are always engaging, and the plot is unique and entertaining."
