= Sweet, Sweet Lonely Girl =

- Directed by: A.D. Calvo
- Written by: A.D. Calvo
- Produced by: Mike S. Ryan
- Starring: Erin Wilhelmi; Quinn Shephard; Susan Kellermann
- Cinematography: Ryan Parker
- Edited by: Matthew C. Levy
- Music by: Joe Carrano
- Production companies: Budderfly Productions; Goodnight Film; Greyshack Films
- Distributed by: Shudder
- Release dates: September 22, 2016 (Fantastic Fest); May 3, 2017
- Running time: 76 minutes
- Country: United States
- Language: English

Sweet, Sweet Lonely Girl is a 2016 American horror film written and directed by A.D. Calvo and starring Erin Wilhelmi, Quinn Shephard, and Susan Kellermann. The film had its world premiere on September 22, 2016, at Fantastic Fest. Filming for Sweet, Sweet Lonely Girl took place in Vernon, Connecticut during late 2015.

== Plot ==
Adele is a lonely teenage girl who has been sent to care for her aunt Dora, who is agoraphobic and refuses to have any contact with Adele other than a series of handwritten messages and rules slid under her door. She seems to have an escape from this bleak existence after meeting Beth, a vibrant girl her own age and Adele's opposite in looks and personality. As they spend more time together, Adele begins to adopt some of Beth's behaviors and mannerisms, which include her deliberately purchasing inexpensive versions of the items Dora asks her to buy so she can pocket the money.

Adele initially only replaces food items, but Beth eventually persuades her to purchase an over-the-counter heart medicine for her aunt rather than her prescription heart medication. This inevitably results in Dora's death, which Adele only learns about when the food tray remains untouched. Upon discovering the body, Adele takes a ring with a greenish stone off of her aunt's body and calls the ambulance crew to take away the remains.

Adele takes the ring to Beth and leaves it outside of her apartment door, as she believes them to be in a relationship after the two share moments of passion on a beach. She is hurt to discover that this was not the case and storms off, leaving Beth to discover the ring on her own. Afterwards, Adele pawns her aunt's jewelry and purchases a blouse she had been eyeing for a while. Wearing the blouse, Adele goes to a bar and picks up a man, who is unable to see Beth watching the two of them at the bar.

Later, Adele is frightened by Beth, who appears behind her and begins acting strangely. Upon hearing a noise upstairs, Adele goes to investigate and experiences inexplicable phenomena, seeing the decrepit figure of her dead aunt. Unable to leave the house, Adele tries to hide in the basement but is discovered by Beth, who now possesses a monstrous figure. When Adele's younger sister, Dory, comes to the house to care for her, Adele now resembles an old woman, implying that Beth has stolen her youth—and is much older than she appears—and that the cycle will repeat itself with Dory.

== Cast ==
- Erin Wilhelmi as Adele
- Quinn Shephard as Beth
- Susan Kellermann as Dora
- Jonathan Holtzman as guy
- Frances Eve as Dory
- Kristin Johansen as old Adele
- Lainie Ventura as Adele's mom
- Matt Goyette as Gary
- A.J. Helm as grocery clerk
- David Pirrie as Dave Jessup
- Mike S. Ryan as pawnbroker
- Adam Schartoff as pharmacist
- Hada Vanessa as boutique clerk

== Reception ==
Rotten Tomatoes, a review aggregator, reports that 83% of surveyed critics gave the film a positive review. IndieWire's Eric Kohn characterized the film as "Bergmanesque" and publicly praised it as being an, "artfully subdued gothic lesbian psychological horror tale with great atmosphere." Bloody Disgusting and Modern Horrors both reviewed Sweet, Sweet Lonely Girl, the former writing that the movie "not without flaws – the rather sudden ending, for one – and it does nothing to update the genre, or comment on its influences" but that "Those who appreciate that side of the genre will find something rare and delightful. It is a stylistic achievement, and in the end, a melancholy exploration of just what the title promises – loneliness." The Austin Chronicle also reviewed the movie, commenting that they found the film's "little moments" "chillingly captivating".
