= Christopher Woodrow =

American entrepreneur, financier, and film producer

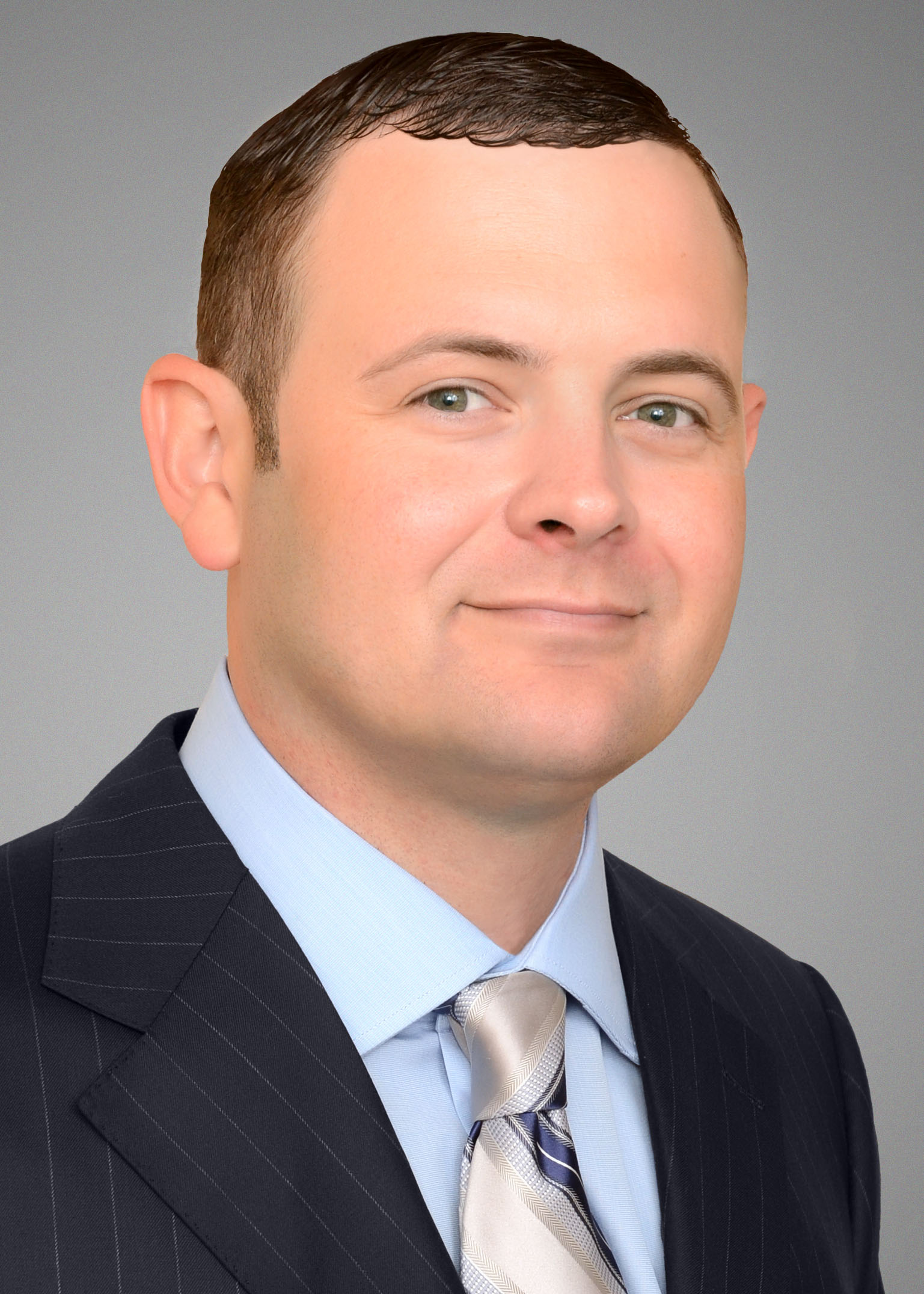
- Born: July 19, 1977 (age 49); Syracuse, New York, U.S.
- Education: University of Alabama
- Occupations: Entrepreneur; financier; movie producer
- Years active: 1999–present
- Website: christopherwoodrow.com

Christopher Woodrow is an American entrepreneur, financier, and film producer. He is the founder and chairman of Media Capital Technologies and co-chairman of Row K Entertainment. Woodrow is the former chairman and CEO of Worldview Entertainment. He has been credited as a financier or producer on more than 50 feature films.

== Career ==
Woodrow moved to New York City in 2001 to work on Wall Street in investment banking at Oppenheimer & Co. from 2001 to 2003 before becoming a vice president at Citigroup Global Markets from 2003 to 2005. He was then managing director of Prospect Point Capital, a media and entertainment investment company, from 2005 to 2007.

Woodrow was the founder, chairman, and CEO of Worldview Entertainment from 2007 to 2014. The company was described by The Hollywood Reporter as a major player in independent motion picture finance and production. He departed Worldview in June 2014. The company filed a lawsuit against Woodrow in October 2014, alleging misappropriation of funds. He denied the allegations and countersued Worldview for defamation. The company ceased operations in March 2015. Woodrow and Worldview settled their lawsuits in a "walkaway" agreement with no money exchanged, with TheWrap reporting that Woodrow was cleared of fault.

Woodrow was the founder, chairman, and CEO of Vendian Entertainment, the successor to Worldview, from 2014 to 2016. The companies collectively financed and produced more than 30 feature films, including Birdman, Black Mass, and Hacksaw Ridge. Worldview and Vendian films collectively received 16 Academy Award nominations and won six Oscars, including Best Picture.

Woodrow financed or produced other independent films during this period, including Killer Joe, The Green Inferno, The Immigrant, The Neon Demon, Triple 9, and Wish I Was Here. He was named one of 10 Producers to Watch by Variety in 2012 and one of five Producers to Watch by Deadline at the Cannes Film Festival in 2013. Woodrow served as an event chair of amfAR's annual Cinema Against AIDS Gala at the Hôtel du Cap in 2014 and 2015.

Woodrow relocated to Los Angeles in 2017. He was the founder and CEO of MovieCoin, an entertainment finance company that sought to use blockchain technology and cryptocurrency to develop new models for film financing, from 2017 to 2018.

Woodrow has been the founder and chairman of Media Capital Technologies (MCT) since 2019. MassMutual acquired an ownership interest in the company in 2021. MCT entered into a multi-year slate co-financing deal with Lionsgate and invested in 20 films with the studio between 2023 and 2025, including Saw X, The Ministry of Ungentlemanly Warfare, Flight Risk, Ballerina, and The Long Walk.

Woodrow and Eli Roth worked together again when Roth founded The Horror Section in partnership with MCT in 2025. Woodrow served as chairman of the board from 2025 to 2026 and financed and produced Roth's Ice Cream Man. The film was sold to international distributors, including StudioCanal, at the Cannes Film Festival.

Woodrow announced the launch of MCT Credit Solutions in 2026, a private credit investment platform created in partnership with MassMutual, alongside the closing of a $100 million credit facility for entertainment financier BondIt Media Capital. The transaction represented the company's second private credit transaction within the previous 12 months.

== Filmography ==
Year	Film	Credit	Ref.
2006	Just Like the Son	Executive producer	
2008	Adventures of Power	Executive producer	
2008	Living in Emergency	Executive producer	
2009	Asylum Seekers	Executive producer	
2011	Killer Joe	Executive producer	
2013	Ass Backwards	Executive producer	
2013	Blood Ties	Producer	
2013	Devil's Knot	Producer	
2013	The Green Inferno	Producer	
2013	The Immigrant	Producer	
2013	Jimmy P.	Executive producer	
2013	Joe	Producer	
2013	The Sacrament	Producer	
2013	Welcome to the Punch	Executive producer	
2014	Birdman	Executive producer	
2014	Manglehorn	Producer	
2014	The Search	Executive producer	
2014	Song One	Producer	
2014	Wish I Was Here	Executive producer	
2015	Black Mass	Executive producer	
2015	Legend	Executive producer	
2016	Free State of Jones	Executive producer	
2016	Hacksaw Ridge	Executive producer	
2016	The Neon Demon	Executive producer	
2016	Rules Don't Apply	Producer	
2016	Snowden	Executive producer	
2016	Triple 9	Producer	
2017	American Made	Co-executive producer	
2017	Tulip Fever	Executive producer	
2023	About My Father	Executive producer	
2023	Cobweb	Executive producer	
2023	Expend4bles	Executive producer	
2024	Bagman	Executive producer	
2024	The Best Christmas Pageant Ever	Executive producer	
2024	Jimmy and Stiggs	Executive producer	
2024	The Ministry of Ungentlemanly Warfare	Executive producer	
2024	Never Let Go	Executive producer	
2024	White Bird	Executive producer	
2025	Dead Man's Wire	Executive producer	
2025	Dream Eater	Executive producer	
2025	Charlie Harper	Executive producer	
2025	Flight Risk	Executive producer	
2025	Good Fortune	Executive producer	
2025	The Housemaid	Executive producer	
2025	The Long Walk	Executive producer	
2025	Now You See Me: Now You Don't	Executive producer	
2025	Shadow Force	Executive producer	
2026	Ice Cream Man	Producer	
2026	Power Ballad	Executive producer	
2026	Stiletto	Executive producer	
