= The Horror Section =

American media company

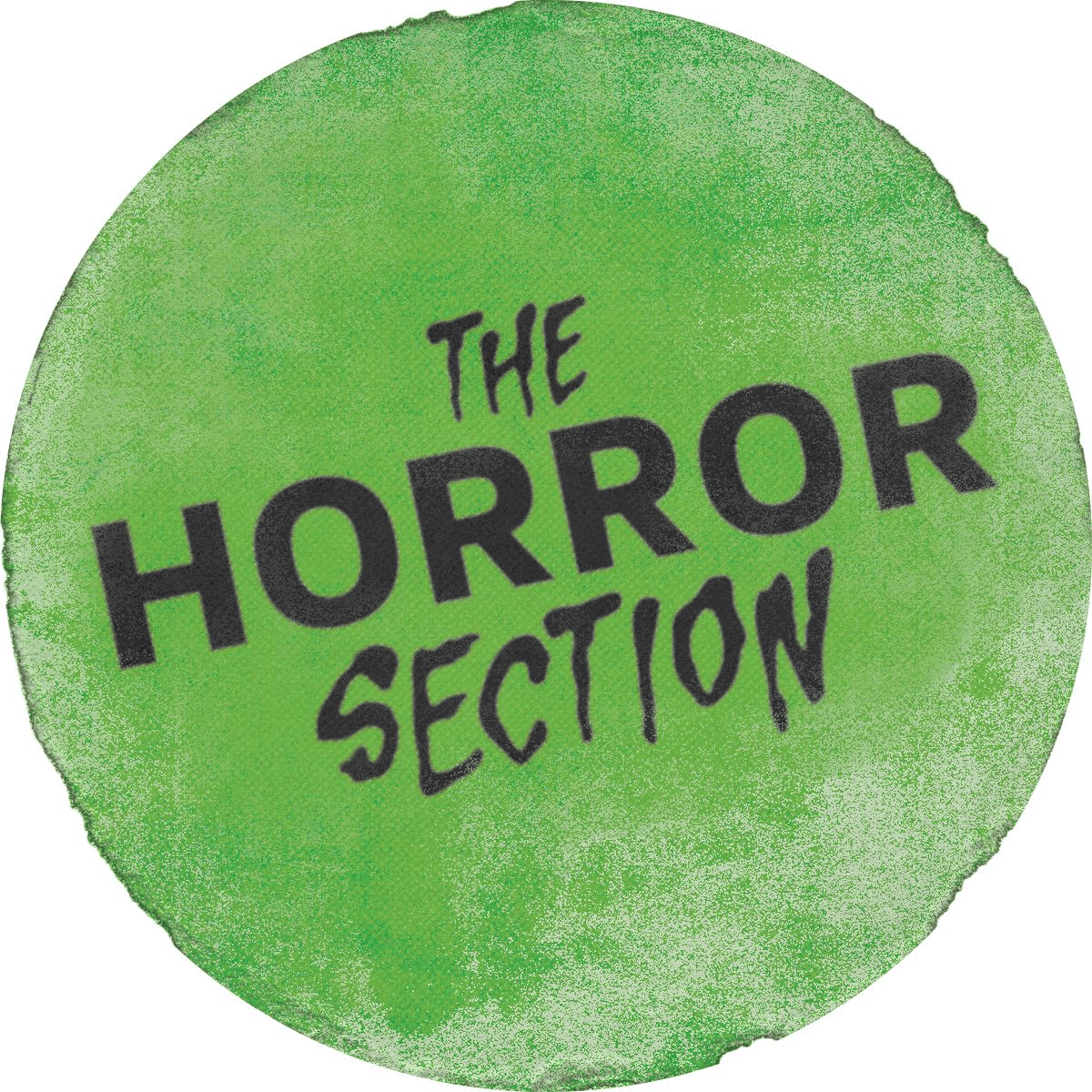
- Type: Private
- Industry: Film; Television
- Founded: March 14, 2025; 17 months ago
- Founder: Eli Roth
- Headquarters: Los Angeles, CA, U.S.
- Website: horrorsectionstudios.com

The Horror Section is an American media company founded by Eli Roth. The company develops, finances, produces, and distributes horror films and related media.

== History ==
The Horror Section was founded by Eli Roth in partnership with Media Capital Technologies. Jon Schnaars is the co-founder and chief executive officer. Christopher Woodrow served as chairman of the board from 2025 to 2026.

In May 2025, The Horror Section announced that it would co-finance and produce Ice Cream Man, which would be written and directed by Roth. The film was introduced to international buyers at the Cannes Film Festival, where StudioCanal's Sixth Dimension acquired distribution rights to the film across the U.K., Germany, France, Benelux, Poland, Australia, and New Zealand.

That same month, The Horror Section signed a multi-year, multi-picture co-financing and production alliance with Construction Film, the German-based production banner founded by Veronica Ferres.

In June 2025, The Horror Section completed a financing round led by investment platform Republic. The company raised capital from more than 2,400 investors.

In September 2025, The Horror Section announced at the Toronto International Film Festival that it would produce Don't Go in That House, Bitch!, which would be written and directed by Roth. The film will be based on a viral faux trailer released the previous month featuring voiceover narration and music by Snoop Dogg, who is attached to star, produce, and write the original soundtrack for the feature.

In March 2026, The Horror Section entered into a strategic partnership with Nas' media and content company, Mass Appeal. Through the partnership, which includes an investment from Mass Appeal into The Horror Section, the two companies will collaborate across many aspects of the business, including having Roth and Nas co-develop film and television projects.

In July 2026, People reported that The Horror Section was partnering with Insight Editions to create a line of horror-inspired books.

In August 2026, Ice Cream Man was released theatrically. The Horror Section retained domestic distribution rights and released the film in theaters across the United States via Iconic Events.

== Filmography ==
Year	Title	Role	Notes
2024	Jimmy and Stiggs	Financier – Distribution Rights	Directed by Joe Begos; written by Joe Begos; presented by Eli Roth; starring Joe Begos and Matt Mercer
2025	Dream Eater	Financier – Distribution Rights	Directed by Jay Drakulic, Mallory Drumm, and Alex Lee Williams; written by Jay Drakulic, Mallory Drumm, and Alex Lee Williams; presented by Eli Roth; starring Alex Lee Williams and Mallory Drumm
2026	Death Boom	Producer	Directed by Jessica Chandler; produced by Eli Roth, Leonardo DiCaprio, Sean McKittrick, Phillip Watson, Jennifer Davisson, and Ray Mansfield
2026	Ice Cream Man	Financier – Producer – Distribution Rights	Directed by Eli Roth; written by Eli Roth and Noah Belson; produced by Eli Roth, Kate Harrison Karman, Christopher Woodrow, and Raj Singh; starring Ari Millen, Benjamin Byron Davis, Karen Cliche, Dylan Hawco, Sarah Abbott, Shiloh O'Reilly, Kiori Mirza Waldman, Charlie Zeltzer, Charlie Storey, and Eli Roth
2026	Stiletto	Financier – Distribution Rights	Directed by Samuel Gonzalez Jr.; written by Samuel Gonzalez Jr. and Gigi Gustin; presented and produced by Eli Roth; starring Gigi Gustin, Charlotte McKinney, Colleen Camp, Meghan Carrasquillo, Stephen Blackehart, and Hannah Hueston
2027	Don't Go in That House, Bitch!	Producer	Directed by Eli Roth; written by Eli Roth; produced by Eli Roth and Snoop Dogg; starring Snoop Dogg
