= Prank (disambiguation) =

A prank or practical joke is a mischievous trick played on someone.

The Prank is a 2022 American film.

Prank or The Prank may also refer to:

- Prank (film), a 2016 Canadian film
- Prank (The Batman), a character in the 2004 TV series The Batman
- Prank (The Flash), a character in some versions of The Flash
- "The Prank" (Chowder episode), a 2010 episode of the TV show Chowder
- "The Prank" (The Amazing World of Gumball), a 2011 episode of the TV show The Amazing World of Gumball
