= Sarah Abbott (actress) =

Canadian actress

- Born: Sarah Nicole Abbott; 22 January 2006 (age 20)
- Occupations: Actress, Dancer
- Years active: 2015–present

Sarah Abbott (born 22 January, 2006) is a Canadian film and television actress and dancer.

== Career ==
From Whitby, Canada, Abbott initially trained as a dancer before focusing on acting. She has her first role as a young Marilyn Monroe in series The Secret Life of Marilyn Monroe (2015) and a first film role in Lavender (2016) which premiered at the Tribeca Film Festival. She had early roles as a child actor in Netflix anthology series Black Mirror in the Jodie Foster episode Arkangel (2017), as well as Netflix film The Silence (2019), and as Abigail Coleman in NBC supernatural television series The InBetween (2009).

Abbott could be seen in Eli Roth horror film Ice Cream Man (2026). Abbott appeared as Olivia in a recurring role in Quinn Shephard coming-of-age television drama The Body (2026). She has an upcoming role in Netflix series Poser. In November 2026, she was cast as Betty Cooper in Disney+ series Afterlife With Archie.

== Partial filmography ==
Key
†	Denotes works that have not yet been released

Year	Title	Role	Notes
2015	The Secret Life of Marilyn Monroe	Young Marilyn Monroe	
2016	Lavender	Susie	
2017	Black Mirror	Sara aged 9	Episode Arkangel
2019	The Silence	Hushed child	
2019	The InBetween	Abigail Coleman	3 episodes
2019	V-Wars	Amelia	3 episodes
2021	Ginny & Georgia	Teenage Maddie	1 episode
2025	Sheriff Country	Darcy	1 episode
2026	Ice Cream Man	Lizzie	
2026	The Body	Olivia	Recurring role
TBA	Poser†		
TBA	Afterlife With Archie †	Betty Cooper	
