= Media Capital Technologies =

American investment management company

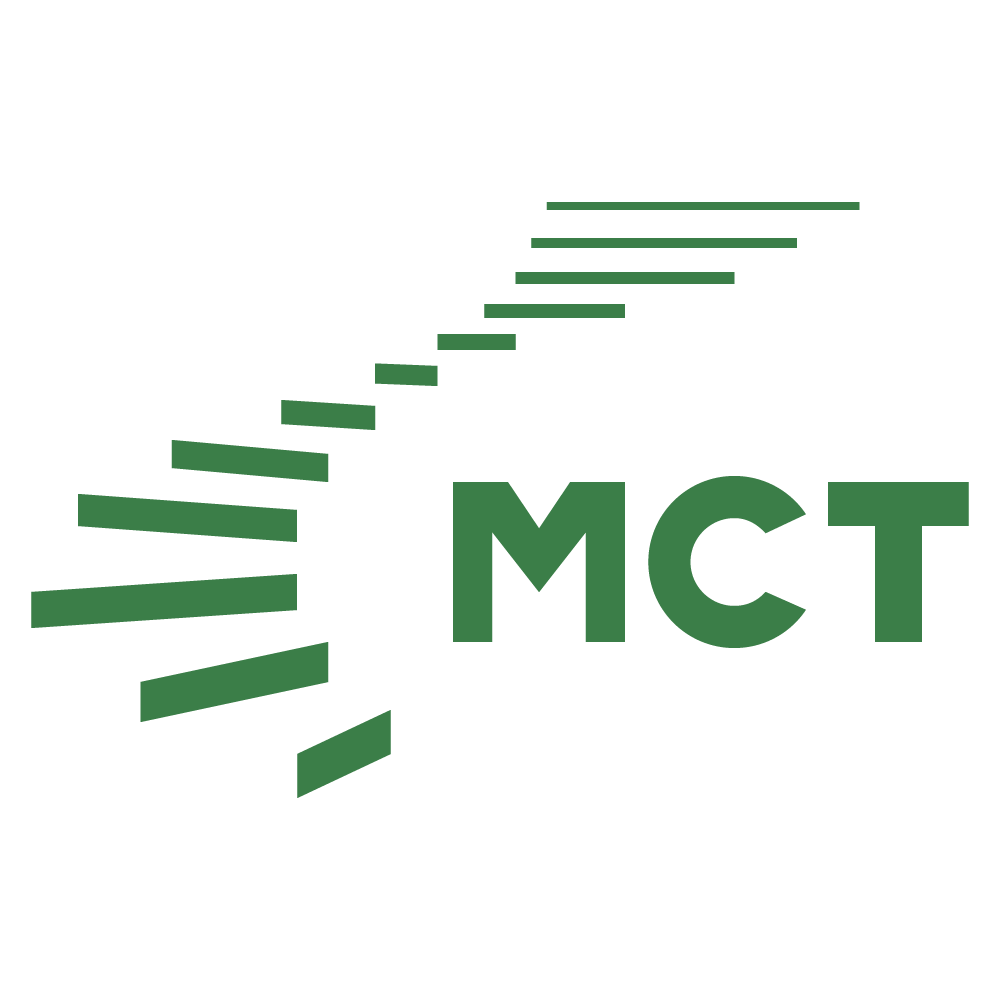
- Type: Private
- Industry: Investment management
- Founded: May 24, 2019; 7 years ago
- Founders: Christopher Woodrow; K. Blaine Johnston; Michael Lambert
- Headquarters: West Hollywood, CA, U.S.
- Key people: Christopher Woodrow; Raj Singh
- Owners: MassMutual (minority stake)
- Subsidiaries: MCT Credit Solutions; Row K Entertainment
- Website: mediacap.io

Media Capital Technologies (MCT) is an American media and entertainment investment company headquartered in West Hollywood, California. The company invests in and provides financing to businesses in the media and entertainment industry.

== History ==
=== Early history ===
MCT was founded in 2019 by Christopher Woodrow, who is chairman, and was subsequently joined by K. Blaine Johnston as a co-founder. Michael Lambert, former chairman of Lambert Media Group, co-chairman of Village Roadshow Pictures, and president of domestic television at 20th Century Fox, joined the company in 2020 as a co-founder. MassMutual acquired an ownership interest in MCT in 2021. Raj Singh joined the company in 2024 and is chief executive officer.

=== Corporate developments ===
In April 2023, MCT entered into a multi-year slate co-financing deal with Lionsgate, investing in 20 films released between 2023 and 2025, including Saw X, The Ministry of Ungentlemanly Warfare, Flight Risk, Ballerina, and The Long Walk.

In March 2025, MCT partnered with Eli Roth to launch The Horror Section. The company's first production, Ice Cream Man, written and directed by Roth, was sold to international distributors, including StudioCanal, at the Cannes Film Festival.

In May 2025, MCT announced a partnership with London-based financier Head Gear Films to provide capital for senior secured loans, alongside Allianz Global Investors and Compton Ross.

In August 2025, MCT launched Row K Entertainment ahead of the Toronto International Film Festival. The company acquired U.S. distribution rights to several films, including Dead Man's Wire, before suspending distribution activities in 2026 amid financial and operational difficulties.

In November 2025, MCT appointed Jordan Lichtman as chief operating officer and general counsel.

In February 2026, MCT launched MCT Credit Solutions, a private credit investment platform created in partnership with MassMutual. Its first major transaction was a $100 million credit facility for entertainment financier BondIt Media Capital.

In October 2026, MCT Credit Solutions partnered with Rome-based financial services group RP1 Holding to launch the €100 million One Media Capital Fund, providing financing for audiovisual production and film distribution in Italy.

== Filmography ==
MCT received co-financing or production credits on the following films:

Year	Film	Director	Distributor	Budget	Worldwide Gross	Ref.
2023	About My Father	Laura Terruso	Lionsgate	$30 million	$18.2 million	
2023	Cobweb	Samuel Bodin	Lionsgate	$13 million	$10.1 million	
2023	Expend4bles	Scott Waugh	Lionsgate	$100 million	$51 million	
2024	The Ministry of Ungentlemanly Warfare	Guy Ritchie	Lionsgate	$60 million	$29.8 million	
2024	The Crow	Rupert Sanders	Lionsgate	$50 million	$24.1 million	
2024	Never Let Go	Alexandre Aja	Lionsgate	$20 million	$21.8 million	
2024	Bagman	Colm McCarthy	Lionsgate	$14.5 million	$1.8 million	
2024	White Bird	Marc Forster	Lionsgate	$20 million	$9.1 million	
2024	The Best Christmas Pageant Ever	Dallas Jenkins	Lionsgate	$10 million	$40.3 million	
2025	Flight Risk	Mel Gibson	Lionsgate	$25 million	$48.7 million	
2025	Shadow Force	Joe Carnahan	Lionsgate	$40 million	$5.3 million	
2025	The Long Walk	Francis Lawrence	Lionsgate	$20 million	$63.1 million	
2025	Good Fortune	Aziz Ansari	Lionsgate	$30 million	$26 million	
2025	Now You See Me: Now You Don't	Ruben Fleischer	Lionsgate	$90 million	$246.6 million	
2025	The Housemaid	Paul Feig	Lionsgate	$35 million	$400.5 million	
2026	Power Ballad	John Carney	Lionsgate	$10 million	$3.4 million	
2026	Ice Cream Man	Eli Roth	Iconic Events	$5.5 million	$7.6 million	
