= Dream Eater =

Dream Eater may refer to:

- Dream Eater (Kingdom Hearts), a species in the Kingdom Hearts universe
- "Dream Eater", a 2014 song by For the Fallen Dreams
- "Dream Eater" (album), a 2019 EP by Y2K and bbno$
- Dream Eater (film), a 2025 found footage horror film

== See also ==
- Dream Eater Merry, a Japanese manga series
