= Everything to Me =

Everything to Me may refer to:

- "Everything to Me" (Liz Phair song)
- "Everything to Me" (Monica song)
- "Everything to Me" (Porter Robinson song)
- "Everything to Me" (Shane Filan song)
- "Everything to Me", a song by Avalon from Testify to Love: The Very Best of Avalon
- "Everything to Me", a song by Brooke Hogan
- "Everything to Me", a song by Kid Rock from Bad Reputation (Kid Rock album)
- "Everything to Me", a song by Planetshakers from Open Up the Gates
- Everything to Me, an album by Hinda Hicks
- Everything to Me, an album by Lil Rob
- Everything to Me, title of 8th episode of Big Shot (TV series), an American television series developed by Dean Lorey and David E. Kelley
- Everything to Me (film), a 2024 American comedy-drama
