= Colin Frizzell =

Canadian writer

Colin Frizzell (born 1971) is a Canadian author of screenplays and young adult novels from Prince Edward County, Ontario, Canada. He is a member of the Writers Union of Canada and the Irish Writers' Union.

His first novel, Chill, was published in 2006 by Orca Book Publishers as part of Orca Book Publishers' award-winning Orca Soundings series. The School Library Journal said Chill was "...perfect for struggling and reluctant readers." Chill has also received notable praise from Kliatt and CM Magazine.

Frizzell's second novel, Just J received a Toronto Arts Council grant. Published in 2007, Just J was named as one of the top ten choices for young readers by the Ontario Library Association. The Canadian Children's Book Centre also placed Just J in their Best Books for Kids & Teens 2008 magazine. It also received positive reviews from The Globe and Mail, Voya, Kliatt, CM Magazine and School Library Journal and has been translated for release in Norway and Sweden.

Frizzell was the co-writer of the screenplay for the 2016 movie Lavender.

== Bibliography ==
- Chill (2006)
- Just J (2007)
