= Flushed (film) =

1999 film

- Directed by: Carrie Ansell
- Written by: Carrie Ansell
- Produced by: Ken Greenblatt
- Starring: Zach Galifianakis; Miriam Shor; Jason Sklar; Randy Sklar; Benjamin Byron Davis
- Edited by: Carrie Ansell
- Release date: 1999
- Running time: 77 minutes
- Country: United States
- Language: English

Flushed is a 1999 American comedy film written, edited and directed by Carrie Ansell and produced by Ken Greenblatt.

== Plot ==
A series of comic vignettes that take place primarily in a nightclub women's and men's room.
