= The Rotten Fruit =

- Genre: Adult animation; Black comedy
- Created by: Eli Roth; Noah Belson
- Directed by: Eli Roth
- Voices of: Noah Belson; Gabriel Roth; Eli Roth
- Country of origin: United States
- No. of episodes: 8

Production
- Producers: Evan Astrowsky; Alex Keledjian; Eli Roth

Original release
- Release: 2000

The Rotten Fruit is a 2000 American adult stop-motion animated satirical black comedy miniseries created by Noah Belson and Eli Roth. Described as a "modern satire" running roughly three to five minutes each episode, the show revolves around a British rock and roll band consisting of violent, sociopathic pieces of fruit. Roth, the co-creator of the series, went on to a successful career in film directing such films as Cabin Fever and Hostel.

Originally, the eight episodes were released on the now defunct Z.com. Roth re-released all episodes on WeShort in 2025.

Several episodes have been included as Special Features in the home media release of Cabin Fever, with three episodes (Episodes 1, 5, 7) being published on the 2004 DVD release of the film and two additional episodes being added to the 2010 Blu-ray release of the movie.

== Episodes ==
No.	Title	Synopsis
1	The Battle of the Bands	The Rotten Fruit compete against the popular boy band C-5 in a battle of the bands. Suspecting they might lose, the Fruit use cutthroat tactics to ensure victory.
2	Concert Riots	After a stampede at one of their concerts resulting in the death of a fan, the band decide to put on a benefit show, with even more disastrous results.
3	The Critic	The Rotten Fruit take their biggest critic hostage to try and win him over.
4	We Are the World	Manager Guy The Pie Shapiro arranges a collaboration for a charity song, only for the band to learn it's with the newly re-formed C-5.
5	Snackster	The Rotten Fruit try to put an end to online piracy by personally going after the fans stealing their music.
6	David Lunch	The Rotten Fruit film a music video with legendary artist and surrealist director David Lunch.
7	Room Service	The Rotten Fruit trash a hotel room, then are tricked into cleaning it up.
8	Cancer Boy	The Rotten Fruit decide to record a benefit song for a young peach with cancer, only to realize that no good deed goes unpunished.
