= Chowdaheads =

American animated TV series

- Created by: Eli Roth; Noah Belson
- Directed by: Eli Roth
- Voices of: Noah Belson; Ben Davis; Jennifer Hagedorn-Mikacich; Eli Roth
- Country of origin: United States
- Original language: English
- No. of episodes: 8

Production
- Production companies: WCW; Swell Productions; Mandalay Sports Entertainment

Chowdaheads was an animated television series created by Noah Belson and Eli Roth. Eight short episodes were produced and the first episode was originally scheduled to air during WCW wrestling events but it never actually aired. Roth, the co-creator of the series, went on to a successful career in film directing with such films as Cabin Fever, Hostel and Hostel 2.
