= I Do (But I Don't) =

2004 American television film

- Based on: I Do (But I Don't) by Cara Lockwood
- Teleplay by: Eric C. Charmelo (as Eric Charmelo); Nicole Snyder
- Directed by: Kelly Makin
- Starring: Denise Richards; Dean Cain; Karen Cliche; Jessica Walter
- Music by: Danny Lux
- Country of origin: United States
- Original language: English

Production
- Producers: Jane Goldenring; Randy Sutter
- Cinematography: Serge Ladouceur
- Editor: Micky Blythe
- Running time: 97 minutes
- Production companies: Ira Pincus Films; Von Zerneck-Sertner Films
- Budget: 97 minutes

Original release
- Network: Lifetime
- Release: September 13, 2004

I Do (But I Don't) is a 2004 American made-for-television romantic comedy film starring Denise Richards, Dean Cain, Karen Cliche, Olivia Palenstein and Mimi Kuzyk. It was directed by Kelly Makin and written by Cara Lockwood and Eric C. Charmelo. The film is based on the Cara Lockwood romance novel of the same name.

Junior wedding planner Lauren Crandell, unlucky in love, instantly connects with fireman Nick Corina, only to find he is an integral part of a big job she is organizing.

The film was released on Lifetime on September 13, 2004.

== Plot ==
Junior wedding planner Lauren Crandell's client is the wealthy Darla Tedanski. She will be promoted if it goes well.

The next day, Lauren meets firefighter Nick Corina, who rescues a groom at a wedding. They instantly connect, but bumping into each other that night, Darla is with him. Checking her file, Darla's groom is "James Nicholas Corina."

Trying to forget Nick, Lauren focuses on Darla's wedding. A bridal magazine interviews G, who does not recognize her contribution, although she does almost everything. Darla is a "Bridezilla", a nightmare client, luckily Darla's long-suffering aide Mark helps with humour and camaraderie.

Lauren's best friend surprises her, taking her to the firemen's ball. Nick's very drunk brother Jay asks Lauren to dance. Seeing Lauren's disinterest, Nick dispatches him, then asks her too. Lauren leaves once it ends.

G's mischievous dog, who Lauren often watches while working, causes much damage. As Nick appears, he helps fix everything. Afterwards, he invites Lauren out, who insists they stick to wedding arrangements. Therefore Nick insists on showing her the perfect reception venue. They take a rowboat from a park to the spot, a small children's play park carnival.

Nick admits he took Lauren there, not for the wedding, but to confess something. Lauren panics, stepping off the moving carousel and twisting her ankle. So, Nick takes her to the doctor.

Two hours later, Nick carries Lauren into her apartment. High on pain medication, she admits he is cute, before passing out. Feeling responsible for her, Nick sleeps on the armchair while she is on the sofa. In the morning, he makes her, himself and her sister breakfast.

Darla comes to Lauren's work upset, wanting Lauren to help her and her fiancé adjust the guest list. Fearing to uncomfortably deal with Nick, she faces Jay, his brother. Lauren is relieved to discover Nick is only the best man.

Lauren happily finds Nick in the fire station that evening. He takes her on the roof for a surprise dinner. Lauren confesses she has been standoffish because she believed he was Darla's groom. Nick admits to having once dated her very briefly.

The date goes well, as there is mutual attraction. Lauren goes home with Nick, and they are intimate. Spending the night, she goes directly from there to work the next day.

Arriving late, Lauren discovers G is in Atlanta, leaving her in charge of everything, including her dog. Again, she has to tidy its mess. Darla's mother shows up concerned, as she witnessed Darla with one of the groomsmen, who she suspects was Nick.

Next, Darla requests Lauren push back the wedding date two weeks, to this Saturday. Demanding an explanation, Darla reveals she is pregnant, but not by her fiancé. Lauren puts her foot down, refusing to kill herself to move up the wedding date.

Brad shows up to Lauren's to get her back. Lauren refuses, as he cheated on her. She finally gets him to sign the divorce papers. However, he bumps into Nick as he is leaving and tells him he is her husband, so Nick leaves upset.

Lauren miraculously gets the wedding ready in two days. At the church, she catches Darla messing around with Rick, the youngest Corina brother. Lauren is scolding them when Jay sees, who then punches him, then Nick appears and joins in. G sees the commotion, stops them, then orders everyone to compose themselves.

At the altar, when asked if he will take Darla, Jay scoffs, saying no. Everyone is in shock. Then Darla surprises everyone further by announcing she is in love with Rick, and pregnant with his baby.

Lauren tells off both Rick and Darla's mother, then accidentally kicks her high-heel into the wedding cake. G angrily fires her on the spot. Nick also announces he cannot tolerate her dishonesty, so she leaves depressed.

An article published in a bridal magazine sings the praises of wedding planner assistants, naming Lauren. As a result, she becomes highly sought after. In turn, G tries to rehire Lauren. Not only does she reject the job offer, she opens her own wedding planner company.

Lauren begs Nick for a second chance. Six months later they have a simple wedding at the playpark.

== Cast ==
- Denise Richards as Lauren Crandall
- Dean Cain as Nick Corina
- Karen Cliche as Darla Tedanski
- Olivia Palenstein as Bonnie
- Mimi Kuzyk as Cookie Crandall
- Yannick Bisson as James "Jay" Corina
- Barry Julien as Mark Stewart
- David Lipper as Brad
- Jessica Walter as Gennifer Douglas
- Bruce Dinsmore as Robert
- Tim Rozon as Rick Corina
- Lisa Bronwyn Moore as Interviewer

== Reception ==
Variety said, "Sugary sweet and full of eye candy, 'I Do (But I Don't)' tries hard to hark back to the days when men and women in films meet cute, have a series of silly misunderstandings that put the kibosh on the budding relationship and then meet even cuter to reconcile. In this day of omnipresent email and cell phones, the conceit is a stretch, but Lifetime devotees should find the telepic an amusing trifle with which to spend the night." It concluded "what holds the movie together are the smaller moments — seemingly targeted toward the Lifetime aud — that connect the broader slapstick."
