= Ice Cream Man (2026 film) =

2026 film by Eli Roth

- Theatrical release poster
- Directed by: Eli Roth
- Screenplay by: Eli Roth; Noah Belson
- Story by: Eli Roth
- Produced by: Eli Roth; Kate Harrison Karman; Christopher Woodrow; Raj Singh
- Starring: Ari Millen; Charlie Zeltzer; Shiloh O'Reilly; Kiori Mirza Waldman; Sarah Abbott; Benjamin Byron Davis
- Cinematography: Simon Shohet
- Edited by: Matt Lyon
- Music by: Brandon Roberts
- Production companies: The Horror Section; MCT Studios
- Distributed by: Iconic Events Releasing
- Release date: August 7, 2026
- Running time: 86 minutes
- Country: United States
- Language: English
- Budget: $5.5 million
- Box office: $8.3 million

Ice Cream Man is a 2026 American black comedy slasher film co-written, produced, and directed by Eli Roth. It stars Ari Millen, Charlie Zeltzer, Shiloh O'Reilly, Kiori Mirza Waldman, Sarah Abbott, and Benjamin Byron Davis. In the film, a suburban town descends into madness after its children consume sweet treats that turn them into homicidal maniacs.

Ice Cream Man was theatrically released in the United States on August 7, 2026, by Iconic Events Releasing. The film received negative reviews from critics and grossed $8.3 million against a budget of $5.5 million.

== Plot ==
In Bayleen Bay, an ice cream truck run by a mysterious, silent man arrives and quickly becomes popular amongst the local children. Lactose-intolerant Jared Mayfair avoids eating the treats and is unsettled by the Ice Cream Man, whom he sees following him as he cycles home. He also notices that the children who have eaten the treats are in a trance and watching videos depicting the cartoon character on the truck.

That night, the truck drives through the neighborhood, awakening the children who have eaten the treats. Possessed, they gruesomely murder their parents. The next day, Jared and classmates Tommy and Mia, who have also not eaten the treats, notice strange behavior in their peers. The truck arrives at the school, and the children begin killing their teachers and any other adults in town while force-feeding treats to any non-possessed children. Jared, Tommy, and Mia evade their murderous classmates and barricade themselves in the school.

Meanwhile, Jared's teenage sister Lizzie eats the ice cream intended for Jared and becomes paralyzed but makes herself vomit up the treat. When Jared calls for help, Lizzie instructs him to meet her at the local church before some neighborhood children attack the house. Lizzie's ex-boyfriend Chris saves her, and both drive to the church. As Bayleen Bay descends into chaos, Jared, Tommy, and Mia escape from the school and seek refuge in the church's basement. They discover a giant walk-in freezer filled with the Ice Cream Man's treats and find the local priest hiding there.

The priest explains that the Ice Cream Man is Jonathan Smiley, a once kind-hearted man who visited Bayleen Bay decades ago and was unjustly blamed for hurting local children to cover up the actions of the town's predatory priests. Jared's grandfather, an influential lawyer, ran the case against Jonathan, and the children were pressured to lie, which led to Jonathan being convicted. While in prison, Jonathan had been visited by a necromancer who promised him revenge on the town in exchange for his soul.

To stop Jonathan, the kids must kill the necromancer and the siren accompanying him in his unmarked grave. When Jonathan arrives at the freezer, the priest sacrifices himself to give the kids enough time to run. Jared, Tommy, and Mia reunite with Lizzie and Chris and convince them to drive to the cemetery to find the necromancer's grave. As they dig up the bodies, the children kill Chris before force-feeding treats to Mia and Tommy, possessing them. Cornered by Jonathan, Jared and Lizzie stab the bodies in the grave, but realize too late that they have killed their own parents. The priest is revealed to be the necromancer, having tricked them to help finish the job for Jonathan.

While the guilt-ridden and traumatized Jared and Lizzie are left surrounded by the carnage, Jonathan leaves the now-decimated Bayleen Bay with the possessed children following him, his revenge complete as he goes to terrorize the next town.

== Cast ==
- Ari Millen as Jonathan Smiley / the Ice Cream Man
- Charlie Zeltzer as Jared Mayfair
- Shiloh O'Reilly as Tommy
- Kiori Mirza Waldman as Mia
- Sarah Abbott as Lizzie Mayfair
- Benjamin Byron Davis as the Priest
- Dylan Hawco as Chris
- Karen Cliche as Alison Mayfair
- Eli Roth as Marty Mayfair
- Darrin Baker as Principal Maloney
- Rodrigo Fernandez-Stoll as Mr. Hamlin
- Charlie Storey as Piper
- Luke Dietz as Elliot

== Production ==
In May 2025, Eli Roth and Media Capital Technologies announced the launch of a horror label, The Horror Section, with Roth set to write and direct its first film, Ice Cream Man. Principal photography occurred during mid-2025 in Hamilton, Ontario, and concluded in September. The cast includes Ari Millen, Benjamin Byron Davis, Karen Cliche, Dylan Hawco, and Sarah Abbott. Snoop Dogg provided music for the soundtrack. Virtual Production segments were performed at Dark Slope Studios in Toronto.

In August 2026, Roth confirmed that the film used generative AI in select scenes. This revelation came after Roth previously stated that several of the film's scenes were "hand-drawn".

== Release ==
Ice Cream Man was released in the United States on August 7, 2026.

=== Home Media ===
Ice Cream Man was released digitally on September 22, 2026, and was released on Blu-ray and DVD on October 20, 2026. Along with the 4K Ultra HD SteelBook release on November 17, 2026.

== Reception ==
=== Box office ===
As of November 15, 2026, Ice Cream Man grossed $8.3 million worldwide.

The film released on August 7, 2026, in 1,761 cinemas in the United States and grossed $1 million on its opening.

=== Critical response ===
On the review aggregator website Rotten Tomatoes, 27% of 114 critics' reviews are positive, with an average rating of 3.9/10. The website's consensus reads: "Ice Cream Man mistakes self-aware excess for subversion, serving up an increasingly uninspired splatterfest whose half-melted social commentary can't disguise how little substance lies beneath its gore." Metacritic, which uses a weighted average, assigned the film a score of 34 out of 100, based on 19 critics, indicating "generally unfavorable" reviews.

IGN's Chase Hutchinson gave the film a four out of ten, saying the film is Eli Roth's "version of Terrifier or Weapons" but "lacking the chaotic madness of Art the Clown and the more haunting yet humorous patience with which Zach Cregger approached [Weapons]". Owen Gleiberman from Variety negatively compared the film's brainwashed kids to Art the Clown from the Terrifier series, due to the aforementioned kids not "naturally being aggressive in that way" concluding that "seeing them become insane slashers" is "offputting" and "fake". Pete Hammond from Deadline commented that the film's "underdeveloped concept looks like a bad attempted imitation of last summer’s far superior, Oscar-winning Weapons", which Hammond said that the former by comparison "feels like a (very) low budget attempt to capitalize and exploit".

Screen Rant's Alex Harrison gave the film a three out of ten, saying: "Roth will throw in an explicit reference to something like Alfred Hitchcock's The Birds, or George Romero's Night of the Living Dead, or Wes Craven's A Nightmare on Elm Street. I'll inevitably find myself thinking about those films and the creative visions that powered them, and how effective they were. Suddenly, the lack of imagination in Ice Cream Man's execution doesn't seem so easily forgivable". Jarrod Jones from The A.V. Club gave the film a C grade, negatively comparing the film to Roth's previous horror film Thanksgiving (2023), explaining that "Thanksgiving used inventive variations on its gimmick to build toward its sicko smorgasbord finale, an escalation of gnarly ingenuity that Ice Cream Man lacks", concluding saying that the film is Roth's "most ruthlessly bleak work to date".

Empire's John Nugent awarded the film one star out of five, describing the film as "uncomfortable", "shallow", "out-of-place" amongst "recent horror films like Obsession and Backrooms", filled with "tasteless humor", and concluding the review by calling the movie a: "...cheap, shallow, unthinking gore-fest..."
