= Cara Lockwood =

American novelist

- Citizenship: USA
- Education: University of Pennsylvania
- Writing career
- Language: English
- Genre: Romantic comedy
- Notable work: I Do (But I Don't)

Cara Tanamachi, better known as Cara Lockwood, is an American novelist from Mesquite, Texas.

== Career ==
Tanamachi's novels identify primarily with the romance and romantic comedy genres. As Cara Lockwood, her most successful book was I Do (But I Don't), which was a USA Today bestseller and was made into a Lifetime Original Movie of the same name starring Denise Richards and Dean Cain.

Tanamachi also wrote the Bard Academy teen series, updating her favorite classics. Titles include Wuthering High, Scarlet Letterman, and Moby Clique.

== Personal life ==
Tanamachi graduated from Mesquite High School in Texas and from the University of Pennsylvania, where she majored in English studies.

Tanamachi wrote most of her novels using her first husband's surname, Lockwood, and began writing under her maiden name after her divorce. She has two children from her first marriage and three stepchildren from her second.

== Bibliography ==
=== As Cara Lockwood ===
Adult novels

- Crandell Sisters Series
  - I Do (But I Don't) (Gallery Books, 2003)
  - I Did (But I Wouldn't Now) (Gallery Books, 2006)
- Pink Slip Party (Gallery Books, 2004)
- Dixieland Sushi (Gallery Books, 2005)
- In One Year and Out the Other (editor, Pocket Books, 2006)
- Demon Series
  - Every Demon Has His Day (Downtown Press, 2009)
  - Can't Teach an Old Demon New Tricks (Downtown Press, 2010)
- Follow Me (Harlequin, 2013; 5-part serial)
- Boys and Toys (Harlequin, 2015)
- Texting Under the Influence (Harlequin, 2015)
- Her Hawaiian Homecoming (Harlequin, 2015)
- The Big Break (Harlequin, 2016)
- Shelter in the Tropics (Harlequin, 2017)
- The Shark and I (Audible, 2017)
- Island of Second Chances (Harlequin, 2018)
- Practicing Parenthood (Harlequin, 2018)
- Dater's Handbook (Hallmark Publishing, 2018; novelization of the Hallmark Channel Original Movie starring Meghan Markle)
- No Strings (Harlequin, 2018)
- Look at Me (Harlequin, 2018)
- Trick and Treat (Harlequin, 2018)
- First Class Sin (Harlequin, 2019)
- Cuffs (Harlequin, 2020)
- The Sex Cure (Harlequin, 2020)
- The Love Cure (Harlequin, 2021)
- Masquerade (Harlequin, 2021)

Young adult novels

- Bard Academy Series
  1. Wuthering High (MTV Books, 2006)
  2. The Scarlet Letterman (MTV Books, 2007)
  3. Moby Clique (MTV Books, 2008)
  4. A Tale of Two Proms (self-published, 2011)

=== As Cara Tanamachi ===
- The Second You're Single (St. Martin's Press, 2023)
