= American Fable =

- Theatrical release poster
- Directed by: Anne Hamilton
- Written by: Anne Hamilton
- Produced by: Anne Hamilton; Kishori Rajan
- Starring: Peyton Kennedy; Richard Schiff; Kip Pardue; Marci Miller; Gavin MacIntosh; Zuleikha Robinson
- Cinematography: Wyatt Garfield
- Edited by: Amanda C. Griffin
- Music by: Gingger Shankar
- Distributed by: IFC Midnight
- Release dates: March 13, 2016 (SXSW); February 17, 2017 (United States)
- Running time: 96 minutes
- Country: United States
- Language: English

American Fable is a 2016 American thriller film written and directed by Anne Hamilton. The film stars Peyton Kennedy, Richard Schiff, Kip Pardue, Marci Miller, Gavin MacIntosh and Zuleikha Robinson. The film was released on February 17, 2017, by IFC Midnight.

== Plot ==
Young Gitty, an 11-year-old girl living on a farm in 1980s rural America, tries not to worry about her family losing the farm and seeks to escape the stress of her home by exploring the farm and its lands. She is shocked to discover, however, that the developer buying up local farms is now seemingly being kept prisoner in the family's old abandoned grain silo at the edge of the farm. Gitty begins spending time with the man, ultimately finding herself torn between loyalty to what she thinks is right, and loyalty to her own family. All is not as it may seem, though, as the family finds itself involved with individuals who are like something out of a fairy tale.

== Cast ==
- Peyton Kennedy as Gitty
- Richard Schiff as Jonathan
- Kip Pardue as Abe
- Marci Miller as Sarah
- Gavin MacIntosh as Martin
- Zuleikha Robinson as Vera
- Charlie Babbo as Michael
- Spencer Moss as Heidi
- Rusty Schwimmer as Ethel
- Theresa Tilly as Anna Winters

== Release ==
The film premiered at South by Southwest on March 13, 2016. On August 16, 2016, IFC Midnight acquired distribution rights to the film. The film was released on February 17, 2017, by IFC Midnight.

== Reception ==
On review aggregator Rotten Tomatoes, American Fable holds an approval rating of 76%, based on 17 reviews, and an average rating of 7.2/10. Metacritic reports a score of 55/100 based on 8 critics, indicating "mixed or average" reviews.

== See also ==
- Film industry in Wisconsin
