= Season for Love =

- Genre: Romantic Comedy
- Written by: Heather Provost; Scott Damian
- Directed by: Jill Carter
- Starring: Autumn Reeser; Marc Blucas; Shelley Thompson; Lola Flanery
- Countries of origin: United States; Canada
- Original language: English

Production
- Running time: 84 minutes
- Production company: Sweet Love Productions Inc.

Original release
- Network: Hallmark Channel
- Release: August 25, 2018

Season for Love is a 2018 American-Canadian romantic comedy. It was directed by Jill Carter and starred Autumn Reeser and Marc Blucas. It premiered on Hallmark Channel on August 25, 2018.

== Plot ==
Two chefs and former high school sweethearts return to their small Texas town. Tyler is a single mother who just lost her job in San Francisco. Khorey is the author of bestselling cookbooks. While they compete in the Annual BBQ cook-off, their feelings are rekindled.

== Cast ==
- Autumn Reeser as Tyler Dawson
- Marc Blucas as Corey Turner
- Shelley Thompson as Jo Dawson
- Lola Flanery as Rosie Dawson
- Paulino Nunes as Jay Noles
- Tara Nicodemo as Sofia Johnson
- Ray Galletti as Eddie Crowley
- Martin Roach as George

== Production ==
The film was shot during three weeks in Port Perry, Ontario, in June 2018.

== Reception ==
Season for Love dominated the top of the weekly cable ratings (in the Scripted Original Programs section) from August 21–26, 2018.
