= Peyton Kennedy =

Canadian film and television actress (born 2004)

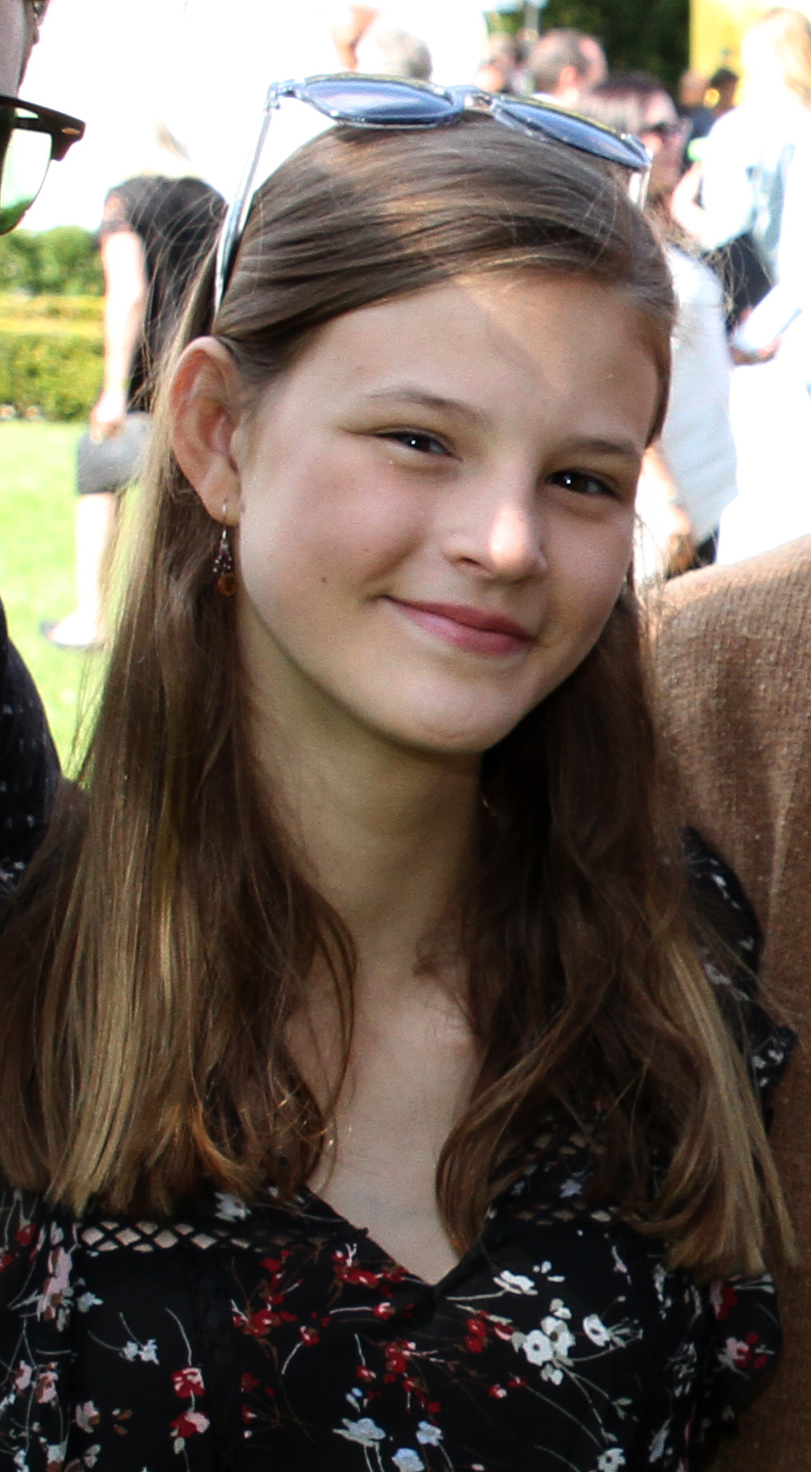
- Kennedy in 2017
- Born: January 4, 2004 (age 22); Toronto, Ontario, Canada
- Occupation: Actress
- Years active: 2012–present

Peyton Kennedy (born January 4, 2004) is a Canadian television and film actress. She is best known for her role as Betty Nelson on the ABC television drama series Grey’s Anatomy (2018–2019). She is also known for her film roles in The Captive (2014), American Fable (2016), and Lavender (2016). She played Kate Messner in the Netflix series, Everything Sucks! (2018), where she played a 15-year-old girl who is trying to figure out her sexuality. She is also known for her role as Dr. O in Odd Squad.

== Early life ==
Kennedy was born on January 4, 2004, in Toronto, Ontario. She attended the Canadian Model and Talent Convention.

== Career ==
Kennedy had a recurring role on the PBS Kids television show Odd Squad (2014–2017). She has also made appearances on numerous other shows, including, Copper, The Ron James Show, Hannibal, Between, Murdoch Mysteries, Killjoys, and Taken.

Kennedy has appeared in the films An Officer and a Murderer (2012), The Captive (2014), Cut Bank (2014), Lavender (2016), American Fable (2016), Odd Squad: The Movie (2016), and XX (2017). She has also starred in the short films, The Offering (2012), To Look Away (2013), Dorsal (2014), and Sunny Side Up (2017).

She starred as Kate Messner in the Netflix series, Everything Sucks! (2018).

== Filmography ==
Film
Year	Title	Role	Note
2012	An Officer and a Murderer	Gwen Pelway	
2012	The Offering	Marla	Short film
2013	To Look Away	Denise	Short film
2014	Dorsal	Iris	Short film
2014	The Captive	Young Cass	
2014	Cut Bank	Rosie (uncredited)	
2016	American Fable	Gitty	
2016	Lavender	Young Jane	
2016	Odd Squad: The Movie	Dr. O	
2017	XX	Jenny Jacobs	Segment "The Box"
2017	Sunny Side Up	Sunny	Short film
2017	Cardinal	Julie	
2020	What The Night Can Do	Luana Cole	
2022	Pond Life	Ellie	
2025	Don't Forget About Me	Jamie Flynn	Short film
2025	Selfie	Sarah	Short horror film

Television
Year	Title	Role	Notes
2013	Copper	Clara Purvis	Episode: "The Place I Called My Home"
2014	The Ron James Show		episode #5.1
2014	Hannibal	Little Girl	Episode: "Takiawase"
2015	Between	Annie	Episodes: "Who's the Boss?" and "End of the Rope"
2015	Murdoch Mysteries	Mary Pickford	Episode: "A Merry Murdoch Christmas"
2016	Killjoys	Xosia	Episode: "Schooled"
2017	Taken	Mattie Glynn	Episodes: "Mattie G."
2014–2017	Odd Squad	Dr. O	Recurring role, 28 episodes
2018	Everything Sucks!	Kate Messner	Lead role
2018–2019	Grey's Anatomy	Betty Nelson / Brittney Dickinson	Recurring role (season 14-15); 12 episodes

== Podcasts ==
Year	Title	Role	Notes
2020	Borrasca	Whitney Walker	

== Awards and nominations ==
List of awards and nominations
Year	Award / Film Festival	Category	Nominated work	Result	Ref.
2013	Young Artist Awards	Best Performance in a Short Film	The Offering	Nominated	
2014	Young Artist Award	Best Performance in a Short Film	To Look Away	Won	
2014	The Joey Awards	Young Actress Age 9 or Younger in a TV Series Drama or Comedy Guest Starring or Principal Role	Copper	Nominated	
2014	The Joey Awards	Young Actress Age 9–10 in a Short Film	Dorsal	Nominated	
2014	The Joey Awards	Young Actress in a Feature Film Principle or Supporting Role	The Captive	Won	
2015	Young Artist Award	Best Performance in a Short Film	Dorsal	Nominated	
2015	Young Artist Award	Best Performance in a TV Series – Recurring Young Actress 10 and Under	Odd Squad	Won	
2015	The Joey Awards	Best Actress in a TV Comedy or Action Recurring Role	Odd Squad	Won	
2015	The Joey Awards	Best Young Ensemble in a TV Series	Odd Squad	Won	
2015	The Joey Awards	Best Actress in a TV Drama Featured Role 10–19 Years	Between	Nominated	
2016	Young Artist Award	Best Performance in a TV Series	Odd Squad	Nominated	
2016	Young Artist Award	Best Performance in a TV Movie, Miniseries, or Special – Leading Young Actress	Murdoch Mysteries	Nominated	
2016	Savannah Film Festival	Breakout Performance	American Fable	Won	
2016	The Joey Awards	Best Young Ensemble in a TV Series	Odd Squad	Nominated	
2016	The Joey Awards	Best Actress in a Feature Film or Made for TV/Straight to video Feature Featured Role	Odd Squad: The Movie	Won	
2017	Canadian Film Festival	Best Breakout Performance	Sunny Side Up	Won	
2017	Young Entertainer Awards	Best Leading Young Actress in an Independent or Film Festival Feature Film	American Fable	Nominated	

== See also ==
- List of Canadian actors
- List of people from Toronto
