= Lavender (2016 film) =

- Film poster
- Directed by: Ed Gass-Donnelly
- Written by: Colin Frizzell; Ed Gass-Donnelly
- Produced by: Ed Gass-Donnelly; David Valleau; Monika Bacardi; Alexandra Klim; Tex Antonucci
- Starring: Abbie Cornish; Dermot Mulroney; Justin Long; Diego Klattenhoff; Peyton Kennedy; Lola Flanery; Agung Bagus; Sarah Abbott; Justin Long; Lissa Repo; Tom Farr; Brook Jones; C.J. Lusby
- Cinematography: Brendan Steacy
- Edited by: Dev Singh
- Music by: Sarah Neufeld; Colin Stetson
- Production companies: South Creek Pictures; 3 Legged Dog Films
- Distributed by: Samuel Goldwyn Films
- Release dates: April 18, 2016 (Tribeca Film Festival); February 3, 2017 (United States)
- Running time: 93 minutes
- Countries: United States; Canada
- Language: English

Lavender is a 2016 drama film directed by Ed Gass-Donnelly and written by Colin Frizzell and Ed Gass-Donnelly.

The film stars Abbie Cornish as a young mother struggling with memory lapses related to her troubled childhood. Co-stars include Dermot Mulroney, Justin Long, Diego Klattenhoff, Peyton Kennedy and Lola Flanery. The film was released on DirecTV on February 3, 2017, before being released on VOD and in theaters on March 3, 2017, by Samuel Goldwyn Films.

== Plot ==
In 1985, police officers tell Patrick that something has happened to his brother and his family. The police find his brother, his brother's wife, and his niece have all been massacred. The police find Jane, a blood-covered teenager, to be the only survivor. The song "Lavender Blue" plays in the background. Jane is raised by a foster family and has no memory of her family or the tragedy.

In 2010, Jane owns a studio, selling photographs she takes of abandoned farmhouses. She has a strained relationship with her husband Alan and their young daughter Alice, partly because she has memory lapses. On one excursion, she is drawn to the farmhouse from the beginning of the film. Days later, Jane has a car accident and wakes up in the hospital but doesn't recognize Alan and Alice. A doctor explains that the crash aggravated a childhood head injury, the reason for her missing childhood.

Jane receives a mysterious gift; a jack, with a photo from 1985 of the farmhouse she recently photographed. The property records reveal that Jane owns the farmhouse and it has been cared for by Patrick, her uncle. The hospital psychiatrist, Liam, suggests that she visit to try to recover repressed memories. The family decides to visit and meet Patrick, who lives at the next farm. A clerk at a local antiques store shows her a framed page of a 1985 newspaper, detailing the massacre of her family and the suspicion that Jane was responsible. Jane sees Liam, but he leaves before she can approach him.

Jane receives another gift box with a torn family photo featuring young Jane, Susie, and a blurry image of their mother, Jennifer. That night, she sees Susie imploring her to "come find us". She visits Patrick, who says that Jane is the only one who knows what happened to her family. Jane later sees Susie again, who says that they need to hide from "the monster". Alice tells Alan that the girl warned her about the monster in the bedroom, while a nice lady taught her the "Lavender" song.

As Jane insists they leave, Alice screams that a man was chasing her and begins to have an asthma attack. The spirits won't let Jane leave the house when Alan rushes Alice to the hospital. She finds a music box in Susie's room, containing the other half of the torn family photo, revealing Liam to be Jane's father.

Jane finally remembers what happened the night her family died: The sisters heard Patrick enter the house and hid under the bed, but Patrick pulled Susie out and was preparing to molest her when their parents arrived home (Jennifer, her mother, who turns out to be the antiques store clerk). Jennifer grabs a hammer and finds Patrick on Susie, who suffers an asthma attack. Patrick kills Jennifer with the hammer, then chases Jane, who runs into Liam. They crash down the stairs, killing Liam and causing Jane’s head injuries. Patrick finds Susie dead of her asthma attack, so he places the hammer in Liam's hand and leaves. Jane wakes up and crawls into the corner the police found her in, covered in Liam's blood.

Adult Jane sits with Liam, who explains that the family's spirits were trapped and could only lead her to the truth so she could set them free. Alan comes and says he dropped Alice off at Patrick's. They rush there as Patrick is preparing to molest Alice, and he shoots at Alan. Jane hits Patrick with a shovel. Patrick wakes up, hands duct taped together, as Jane drags him into Susie's room. As he begs her not to leave him there, she tells him he can plead his case to the family and leaves. The movie ends as Patrick desperately cries for his life.

== Cast ==
- Abbie Cornish as Jane
- Diego Klattenhoff as Alan
- Justin Long as Liam
- Dermot Mulroney as Patrick
- Lola Flanery as Alice Rutter
- Sarah Abbott as Susie
- Liisa Repo-Martell as Jennifer
- Peyton Kennedy as Young Jane
- Agung Bagus as Young Liam
- Katie Odegard as Charlotte
- David Macniven as Reporter
- Mackenzie Muldoon as Jody

== Production ==
On May 11, 2015, Abbie Cornish and Dermot Mulroney joined the cast of the film.

== Release ==
The film premiered at the Tribeca Film Festival on April 18, 2016. The film was released on DirecTV on February 3, 2017, before being released on VOD and in theaters on March 3, 2017, by Samuel Goldwyn Films.

=== Critical reception ===
On the review aggregator website Rotten Tomatoes, 41% of 22 critics' reviews are positive. Metacritic, which uses a weighted average, assigned the film a score of 46 out of 100, based on 7 critics, indicating "mixed or average" reviews.

Writing in The Village Voice, Serena Donadoni published a positive review describing the film as "old-fashioned as Hitchcock's Spellbound, Lavender presents the unlocking of suppressed horrors as a freeing experience, without the messiness of further analysis." On National Post, Calum Marsh rated it 2/4 stars writing that "this story would surprise only someone totally unacquainted with the medium of motion pictures."
