= Lola Flanery =

Canadian actress and model (born 2005)

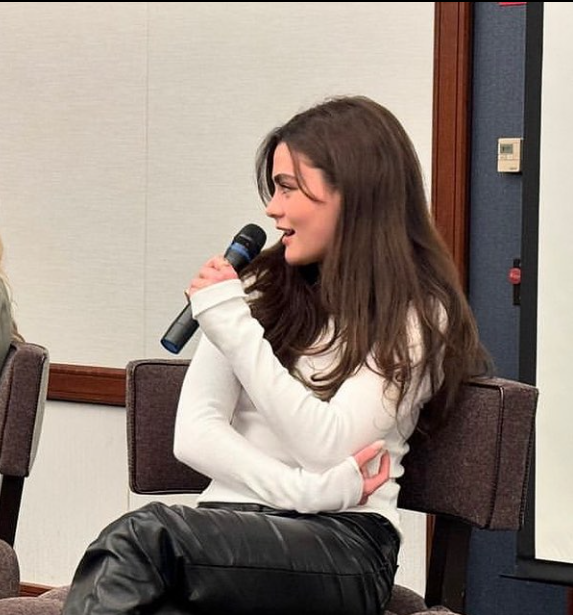
- Lola Flanery at the 2024 Conaggedon convention
- Born: Lola Presley Flanery; May 26, 2005 (age 21); Los Angeles, California, US
- Occupations: Actress; Model
- Years active: 2015–present
- Known for: The 100; Shadowhunters; Home Again; Mary Kills People

Lola Presley Flanery (born May 26, 2005) is a Canadian actress and model. She began her career as a child model before her modelling agent suggested acting. She first appeared in the thriller film Lavender (2016) at age 10. Flanery is best known for her roles as Seelie Queen on the American supernatural drama television series Shadowhunters (2017–2019), as Madi Griffin on the post-apocalyptic, science fiction television series The 100 (2018–2020), and as Isabel in the romantic comedy film Home Again (2017). For her role as Madi Griffin, she was nominated for "Favorite Female Breakout Star" at the 2018 E! TV Scoop Awards.

== Early life ==
Lola Presley Flanery was born on May 26, 2005, in Los Angeles, California, United States. She moved to Toronto, Canada, when she was three years old. Her mother, Sacha Grierson owns a bakery in Toronto. She first started her modelling career for brands such as Gap and Target. She first got into acting at the age of nine after her modelling agent suggested acting classes to which her mother signed her up.

== Career ==
Flanery made her first professional audition for a lead role in 2015 for the thriller film called Lavender where she was cast as Alice. Although her first film project was Lavender, it did not premiere until the Tribeca film festival in April 2016, followed by a theatrical release the following year. Consequently, her first appearance to be released was the 2015 television movie Last Chance for Christmas (also known as The Christmas Star), where she played Madison, the daughter of a reindeer farm owner played by Hilarie Burton. Flanery also appeared in the 2016 Canadian comedy film Sadie's Last Days on Earth as the younger version of the title character.

In 2017, Flanery obtained several recurring roles. She first appeared as Cambie, the younger daughter of the lead character, in the drama series Mary Kills People. She then portrayed Lila DeWitt in the horror series The Mist. That same year, Flanery appeared in the 2017 romantic comedy film Home Again as Isabel, the eldest daughter of Reese Witherspoon's character. She also obtained roles in the independent thriller Touched playing Caitlyn and in the television horror film Neverknock as Jenna, portraying one of a group of teenagers facing a supernatural entity.

Later in 2017, Flanery joined the cast of the Freeform supernatural drama series Shadowhunters during its second season. She was cast as the young version of Seelie Queen (the older one is portrayed by Sarah Hyland) a role for which she was required to speak with an English accent. Flanery noted the casting was a "surprise" because she was not told she was auditioning for; she originally "thought it might be a vampire role." She explained that during her audition, "they had me do both my normal accent and an English one, or my best version of." She continued as a recurring cast member through the show's third season, which aired in 2018. Flanery stated that she didn't read the books before being cast for Shadowhunters, but knew about it and the TV show (as the show was based on the book series).

On August 17, 2017, it was announced that Flanery had been cast as Madi Griffin, the adopted orphan daughter of the series' protagonist Clarke Griffin (Eliza Taylor), in the post-apocalyptic science fiction drama series The 100 on The CW. She then obtained a recurring role through season 7, appearing in over 30 episodes until the series finale in 2020. During this period, she was nominated for "Favorite Female Breakout Star" at the 2018 E! TV Scoop Awards for her work on The 100. As The 100 was being filmed in Vancouver, she spent six months there, and said that "the hardest part was [...] probably schoolwork and catching up to it while also keeping on top of work". She also appeared in the 2018 Hallmark Channel TV movie Season for Love as Rosie Dawson.

On January 8, 2022, Flanery appeared as a panelist in an episode of The CW series World's Funniest Animals. In 2024, she obtained a lead role in the Tubi Original thriller film Deadly Invitations, where she portrayed the Nicole. She also secured the supporting role of Teen Lucy in the comedy-drama film Everything to Me, which premiered at the Mill Valley Film Festival in late 2024. In early 2025, she guest-starred as Ava Lancaster in the season two premiere of Law & Order Toronto: Criminal Intent.

== Personal life ==
Flanery was raised in a family dedicated to charitable causes; her mother, Sacha Grierson, runs Eat My Words, a Toronto-based bakery that donates its proceeds to the Stephen Lewis Foundation. In addition to English, Flanery also speaks French and Mandarin.

== Filmography ==
=== Films ===
Key
†	Denotes films that have not yet been released

Year	Title	Role
2016	Lavender	Alice
2016	Sadie's Last Days on Earth	Young Sadie
2017	Touched	Caitlyn
2017	Home Again	Isabel
2024	Deadly Invitations	Nicole
2024	Everything to Me	Teen Lucy

=== Television ===
Year	Title	Role	Notes
2015	Last Chance for Christmas	Madison	Supporting role; television film
2017–2019	Mary Kills People	Cambie	Recurring role (season1–3), 14 episodes
2017	The Mist	Lila DeWitt	Recurring role, 4 episodes
2017	Neverknock	Jenna	Main role
2017–2019	Shadowhunters	Seelie Queen	Recurring role (seasons 2–3), 8 episodes
2017–2020	The 100	Madi Griffin	Recurring role (season 5–7), 32 episodes
2018	Season for Love	Rosie Dawson	Supporting role; Television film
2021	World's Funniest Animals	Panelist	2 episodes
2025	Law & Order Toronto: Criminal Intent	Ava Lancaster	Episode: "White Squirrel City"

== Awards and nominations ==
Year	Award	Category	Nominated work	Result	Ref
2018	E! News	Favorite Female Breakout Star	The 100	Nominated	
