= Everything to Me (film) =

- Theatrical release poster
- Directed by: Kayci Lacob
- Written by: Kayci Lacob
- Produced by: Kayci Lacob; Tom Nunan
- Starring: Abigail Donaghy; Lola Flanery; Utkarsh Ambudkar; Rich Sommer; Victoria Pedretti; Judy Greer
- Cinematography: Shasta Spahn
- Edited by: Matt McBrayer
- Music by: Stephanie Economou
- Production companies: Winding Way Productions; Bull's Eye Entertainment; Rebellium Films
- Distributed by: Concourse Media
- Release dates: October 12, 2024 (MVFF); September 5, 2025 (United States)
- Running time: 90 minutes
- Country: United States
- Language: English

Everything to Me is a 2024 American comedy-drama film directed, produced, and written by Kayci Lacob, in her feature directorial debut. The film follows Millennial Claudia Lerner, a girl who was raised in Silicon Valley, who needs Steve Jobs as her model.

The film premiered at the Mill Valley Film Festival on October 12, 2024, and was released in the United States on September 5, 2025.

== Cast ==
- Victoria Pedretti as Claudia
  - Hazeleigh Wages as Toddler Claudia
  - Eliza Donaghy as Tween Claudia
  - Abigail Donaghy as Teen Claudia
- Lola Flanery as Lucy
  - Ella Gibson as Tween Lucy
- Utkarsh Ambudkar as Mr. Shine
- Rich Sommer as Claudia's father
- Judy Greer as Claudia's mother
- Gavin Lewis as Quentin
- Priyanka Kedia as Meera
- Becca Worthington as Jess
- Lisa Fenimore as Daniella
- Isaac Arellanes as Lucas
- Chandler Ryan as Book Agent Penny
- Stephanie Zongker as Mrs. Dewitt
- Ginger Gilmartin as Principal Portman
- Daniel Considine as Nelson Ovadon
- Kahlie Metz as Linda Yang

== Production ==
The comedy-drama film, initially titled The Book of Jobs, was granted a SAG-AFTRA interim agreement during the 2023 SAG-AFTRA strike in August 2023. On October 25, 2023, Utkarsh Ambudkar was added to the cast of the film, directed, written, and produced by Kayci Lacob, in her feature directorial debut, with Tom Nunan producing the film under his Bull's Eye Entertainment production company, and Sara E. White and Matthew Shreder serving as executive producers. On November 16, Victoria Pedretti, Judy Greer, Rich Sommer, Abigail Donaghy, and Lola Flanery were cast in the film, with principal photography beginning in Tulsa and Bartlesville the following day, with Shasta Spahn as the cinematographer. Filming wrapped on December 12 after 21 days. Additional filming took place at Florence in early 2024. Oklahoma was chosen as its filming location due to the film incentives. Talia Bella and Randy Wayne provided the production services and consultancy in Oklahoma for the film. Lily Trotter handled the casting for the film. The film's post-production lasted through the end of March. The Cherokee Nation Film Office supported the film. The filmmakers originally applied for the tax credit, but to no avail. The film office offered them to find a local production company so the filmmakers can reapply, where Randy Wayne was found. Stephanie Economou composed the score for the film.

== Release ==
Concourse Media acquired the worldwide sales to the film in October 2023. The film had its world premiere at the Mill Valley Film Festival on October 12, 2024. It also premiered at the Portland Film Festival on October 19, the Rome Independent Film Festival on November 15, and the Sarasota Film Festival on April 12, 2025. Concourse Media released the film theartically on September 5.

== Reception ==
=== Critical response ===
Clint Worthington of RogerEbert.com gave the film two out of five stars, and wrote that the film "feels like an admirable, if flawed, attempt to filter the universal anxieties of discovering yourself and finding your purpose in adolescence through the eye-catching nostalgia of 2000s Silicon Valley consumerism". Miyako Pleines of Spectrum Culture remarks that the film "falls flat". Avi Offer of NYC Movie Guru praised the film's message of "recognizing your self worth and remaining true to yourself".

=== Accolades ===
Award	Date of ceremony	Category	Recipient(s)	Result	Ref.
Hollywood Music in Media Awards	November 19, 2025	Best Original Song in an Independent Film	Stephanie Economou, Maggie Mcclure, Chloé Caroline Fellows, and Jon Monroe (for "Learn to Let Go")	Nominated	
Society of Composers & Lyricists	February 12, 2025	Outstanding Original Score for an Independent Film	Stephanie Economou	Nominated	
