= Stiletto (2027 film) =

2026 film by Samuel Gonzalez Jr.

- Theatrical release poster
- Directed by: Samuel Gonzalez Jr.
- Written by: Samuel Gonzalez Jr. Gigi Gustin
- Produced by: Gigi Gustin; Eli Roth
- Starring: Gigi Gustin; Charlotte McKinney; Colleen Camp; Meghan Carrasquillo; Stephen Blackehart; Hannah Hueston
- Cinematography: Trevor Hooper
- Edited by: Samuel Gonzalez Jr. Matt Lyon
- Production company: Hearse Productions
- Distributed by: The Horror Section
- Running time: 100 minutes
- Country: United States
- Language: English

Stiletto is an independent slasher horror film directed by Samuel Gonzalez Jr., based on a screenplay by Gonzalez Jr. and Gigi Gustin. It stars Gustin as Lyric, an exotic dancer seeking revenge following her sister's murder, alongside Charlotte McKinney, Colleen Camp, Meghan Carrasquillo, Stephen Blackehart, and Hannah Hueston.

The film is distributed by The Horror Section, a horror-focused production and distribution company founded by Eli Roth, who will serve as a producer.

== Premise ==
On the first anniversary of her older sister’s brutal murder, exotic dancer Lyric searches for the masked serial killer responsible, a man with a deadly foot fetish who targets women throughout the local strip club community and collects their high heels as trophies. As he begins killing again, Lyric sets out to protect her fellow dancers and exact revenge.

== Cast ==
- Gigi Gustin as Lyric
- Charlotte McKinney
- Colleen Camp
- Meghan Carrasquillo
- Stephen Blackehart
- Hannah Hueston

== Production ==
Stiletto was written by Samuel Gonzalez Jr. and Gigi Gustin, with Gonzalez Jr. also serving as director. Gustin stars in the film and developed the story in part from her experiences as a former exotic dancer. She independently financed the film through earnings from her work and incorporated elements of her own experiences into the project.

The film was produced by Gustin and Eli Roth, with Roth's company, The Horror Section, acquiring the film's U.S. distribution rights.

In June 2026, The Horror Section announced that Stiletto would be released theatrically in the United States on October 30, 2026.
