= Event cinema =

Use of movie theaters for alternate forms of entertainment

Event cinema sometimes called alternative content cinema or livecasts refers to the use of movie theaters to display a varied range of live and recorded entertainment excluding traditional films, such as sport, opera, musicals, ballet, music, one-off TV specials, current affairs, comedy and religious services.

== History and development ==
Event Cinema was set up at the start of the century with rock concerts by Bon Jovi (2001), David Bowie (2003), and Robbie Williams (2005) bringing non-film audiences into cinemas that had newly installed digital equipment. Through their partnership with Fathom Events the Metropolitan Opera in New York pioneered live satellite broadcasts of performances to movie theaters to expand their market reach. Emulated by other opera houses worldwide such as the Royal Opera House following a close second, Glyndebourne, La Scala and the Sydney Opera House the genre of opera within the 'Event Cinema' industry has been a huge success, and has brought new, younger audiences into cash-strapped opera houses depended on state funding and wealthy benefactors for the first time.

Ballet and theater have also been very successful, as have rock concerts, both live and recorded. The UK's National Theatre has been a huge success here with their season of live broadcasts under the banner 'NT Live', featuring big name casts such as Helen Mirren, whose recent turn as Queen Elizabeth II in The Audience was a sell out everywhere. (This was in partnership with another West End theatre and the NT are keen to help other theatres maximise their potential through live broadcasts). The Globe and the Royal Shakespeare Company are also producing work for live broadcast and recorded exhibition. As digitisation of cinemas matures, the Event Cinema industry is growing. The strongest territory is the US, followed by the UK and mainland European territories. Latin America is also a very strong market.

Recent additions include Pompeii Live, an exhibition by the UK's British Museum, featuring celebrities and curators taking the audience on a live tour around the recreated set of Pompeii within the museum itself, and they are also exploring the schools market for the first time, following the live broadcast on June 18 with a daytime broadcast aimed at UK schools for the first time. If successful this will no doubt prove a model for future museums to emulate.

An added incentive for exhibitors is the ability to show alternative content, i.e. alternative to mainstream, studio-driven content, such as live special events, sports, pre-show advertising and other digital or video content. In industry terms this has become known as 'Alternative Content', but has recently become known more widely as 'Event Cinema'.

=== Expanding markets ===
Some low-budget films that would normally not have a theatrical release because of distribution costs might be shown in smaller engagements than the typical large release studio pictures. The cost of duplicating a digital "print" is very low, so adding more theaters to a release has a small additional cost to the distributor. Movies that start with a small release could scale to a much larger release quickly if they were sufficiently successful, opening up the possibility that smaller movies could achieve box office success previously out of their reach.

==== Technical specifications ====
Event Cinema is also finding a market in 3rd world countries in which the higher costs and quality of DCI equipment are not yet affordable, as crucially there are no DCI specifications for Alternative Content as there is in mainstream [studio] content. This has led to an explosion in the variety of content on offer, but a lack of standardisation has led to questionable quality at times. As the industry matures, this lack of regulation is expected to change and there are moves afoot to introduce codes of practice and technical specifications.

Recorded content complements mainstream studio content by maximising the 'downtime' that plagues the cinema industry, where screens worldwide spend a large proportion of their time in darkness and cinemas empty. Some cinema chains have targeted pensioners in particular, offering free tea and coffee for afternoon matinees of recorded opera, for example. Digital Cinema Packages (DCPs) have been useful to cinemas not yet equipped with satellite broadcasting capability and has enabled exhibitors to build their Event Cinema audience, which is not generally the 18-24 demographic that multiplexes are targeting.

==== New Audiences ====
Event cinema has seen a return of an older, affluent audience, previously turned off by the multiplex experience, and cinemas are starting to capitalise on this by offering waiter-serviced, high class finger food and alcoholic beverages, complete with bars and restaurants, a departure from the traditional popcorn/soft drink model; art house cinemas are increasingly marketing themselves as 'destination' venues for an evening's entertainment, somewhere to spend an entire evening, rather than just a couple of hours. As exhibition admissions have plateau'd in recent years due to the explosion in VOD, tablet and mobile content technology, this new revenue stream has been a largely positive addition to the cinema industry, though the US studios have been cautious in embracing the change as yet.

The thrill of Live broadcasts means they are generally regarded as more popular than recorded events, but there are exceptions; artists with a loyal cult or teenage following tend to do particularly well in this area, as concert films featuring artists such as the Grateful Dead, Pearl Jam, JLS, Led Zeppelin and the Rolling Stones have shown.

==== The Future ====
As more and more distributors are emerging, offering an increasingly broad range of content to cinemas worldwide, the landscape itself is shifting: screen advertising companies, technical providers, and exhibitors themselves are reinventing themselves as Alternative Content or Event Cinema distributors, and the industry is witnessing a re-evaluation of business models and practices worldwide. Predictions are that this industry could be work in excess of US$1bn by 2015. An illustration of the growth of this industry is the news the establishment of a European trade association promoting the industry to the general public and supporting those involved in it and the Event Cinema Association.

== See also ==
- Digital Cinema Initiatives
- Digital Cinema Package
- List of film-related topics (extensive alphabetical listing)
