= Karen Cliche =

Canadian actress

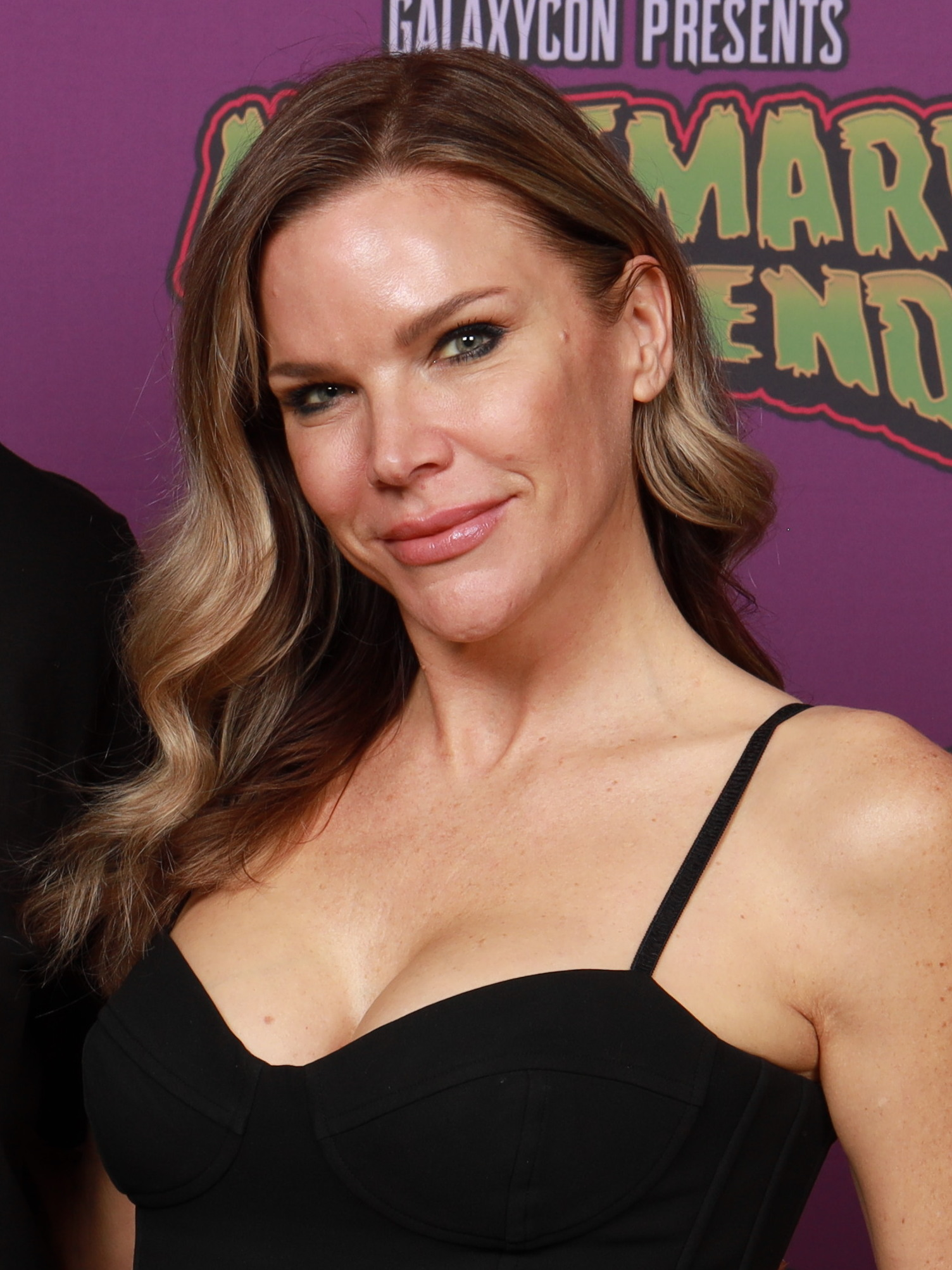
- Cliche in 2025
- Born: July 22, 1976 (age 50); Sept-Îles, Quebec, Canada
- Years active: 1999–present

Karen Cliche (/ˈkliːʃ/; born July 22, 1976) is a Canadian actress. She has appeared in roles on the television series Vampire High, Adventure Inc., Mutant X, Young Blades and Flash Gordon.

== Early life ==
Cliche always wanted to act and did so in school. However, she thought she was "too ambitious to go into acting" and started to study psychology. During this time she already did some modeling and a bit later her modeling agency started an acting department. After studying psychology for a year Cliche decided to leave the university and wanted to focus on her acting career.

== Career ==
In 2001, Cliche auditioned for a part in Vampire High. She was cast as the vampire Essie Rachimova.

In 2017, she played Jessica in Killer Mom. Jessica is a mother who first meets her daughter Allison and wants to be the mother Allison never had.

== Filmography ==
=== Film ===
Year	Title	Role	Notes
1999	The Collectors	Kate	TV movie
2000	Race Against Time	Irina	TV movie
2000	Dr. Jekyll and Mr. Hyde	Muriel	TV movie
2000	Tunnel	Woman on Train	Video
2001	Largo Winch: The Heir	Danielle Dessaultels	TV movie
2001	Wrong Number	Karla Mackay	
2001	Stiletto Dance	Tamara	TV movie
2001	Heist	Alex	
2001	Protection	Savannah	
2002	Summer	Stef Leduc	
2002	Steal	Alex	
2004	Pact with the Devil	Christine	
2004	I Do (But I Don't)	Darla Tedanski	TV movie
2006	Flirting with Danger	Ellen Antontelli	TV movie
2006	Lotto 6/66	Lotto Hostess	Short
2007	Moment	Anne	Short
2008	The Two Mr. Kissels	Pris	TV movie
2009	Saw VI	Shelby	
2010	Ninety-one	Cate	Short
2015	A Wish Come True	Kate Moore	TV movie
2017	Killer Mom	Jessica	TV movie
2018	Mommy's Little Angel	Gloria Namm	TV movie
2018	The Black Widow Killer	Alice Evans/Shannon Collins	TV movie
2019	Turkey Drop	Darcy	TV movie
2021	Galentine's Day Nightmare	Margaret	TV movie
2023	Gwen Shamblin: Starving for Salvation	Natasha	TV movie
2023	Deadly Estate	Valeria Brandt	TV movie
2023	Abducted on Prom Night	Shawna McCann	TV movie
2023	Thanksgiving	Kathleen	
2025	Racewalkers	Desiree	
2026	Ice Cream Man	Alison Mayfair	

=== Television ===
Year	Title	Role	Notes
1999	Misguided Angels	Marsha	TV Series
1999	Big Wolf on Campus	Kim	Episode: "Witch College"
2001	All Souls	Gabby Maine	Episode: "Running Scared"
2001–02	Vampire High	Essie Rachimova	Main Cast
2002	Big Wolf on Campus	Princess Tristan	Episode: "What's Vlud Got to Do with It?"
2002	Galidor: Defenders of the Outer Dimension	Lind	Guest: Season 1, Recurring Cast: Season 2
2002	Undressed	Marissa	Recurring Cast: Season 6
2002–03	Adventure Inc.	Mackenzie Previn	Main Cast
2003–04	Mutant X	Lexa Pierce	Main Cast: Season 3
2005	Young Blades	Jacqueline Roget	Main Cast
2006	Runaway	Erin Baxter	Episode: "Pilot"
2006	The Business	Scarlett Saint-James	Recurring Cast: Season 1
2007	The Dresden Files	Nancy	Episode: "Soul Beneficiary"
2007	Love You to Death	Vicky Milford	Episode: "Murder Mystery Weekend"
2007–08	Flash Gordon	Baylin	Main Cast
2014	Lost Girl	Diana Clare	Episode: "Waves"
2014	Republic of Doyle	Molly Higgins	Episode: "Dirty Deeds"
2016	Beauty and the Beast	Agent Kerry Duffy	Episode: "Point of No Return"
2026	Hudson & Rex	Tawny Bronson	Episode: "All the Wrong Moves"
