= The Prank =

2022 American film by Maureen Bharoocha

- Directed by: Maureen Bharoocha
- Written by: Rebecca Flinn-White; Zak White
- Produced by: Steven J. Wolfe
- Starring: Rita Moreno; Connor Kalopsis; Ramona Young
- Cinematography: Mathew Rudenberg
- Edited by: Matt Diezel; Sarah C. Reeves
- Music by: Deron Johnson
- Production companies: XRM Media; Sneak Preview Entertainment; Inphenate
- Distributed by: Iconic Events Releasing
- Release dates: March 13, 2022 (SXSW); March 15, 2024 (United States)
- Running time: 95 minutes
- Country: United States
- Language: English

The Prank is a 2022 American comedy horror film directed by Maureen Bharoocha and written by Rebecca Flinn-White and Zak White. It stars Rita Moreno, Connor Kalopsis, and Ramona Young. The plot follows two students who falsely accuse their teacher of murder because she threatened to fail them.

The film premiered at South by Southwest on March 13, 2022 and was released theatrically in the United States on March 15, 2024, by Iconic Events Releasing.

== Premise ==
Ben needs good grades to earn a scholarship. His widowed mother Julie is unable to pay for his college tuition. In school, his physics teacher Mrs. Wheeler threatens to fail the entire class after she discovers that someone cheated on the midterm exam. Frustrated, Ben and his best friend Tanner come up with a plan to falsely accuse Mrs. Wheeler of the murder of a missing student.

== Cast ==
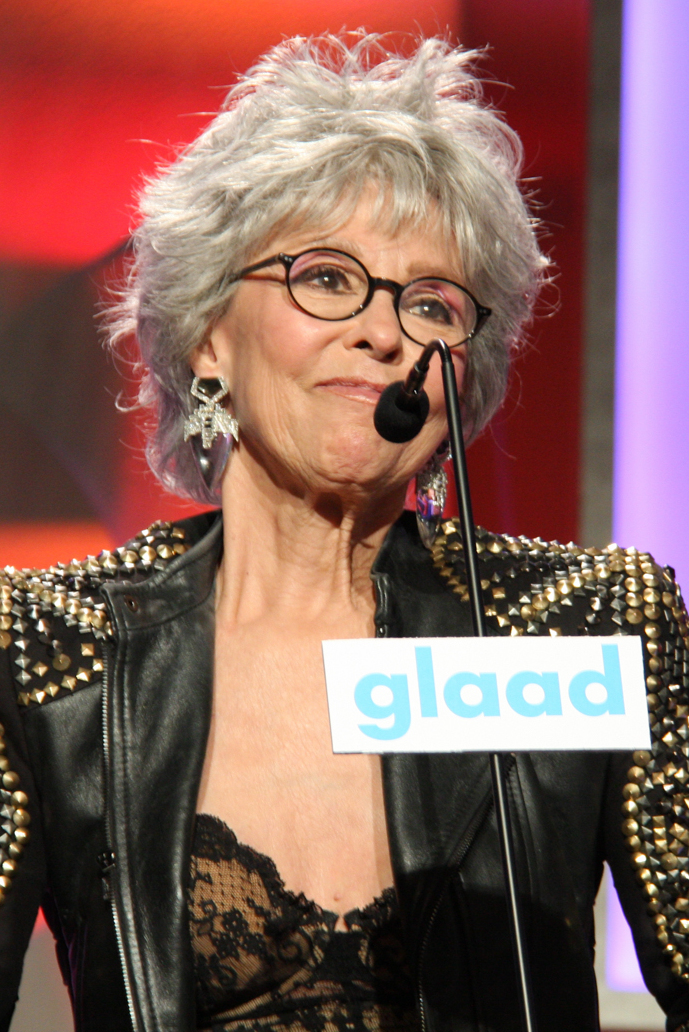
Rita Moreno plays the strict Mrs. Wheeler

- Rita Moreno as Mrs. Wheeler, a physics teacher
- Connor Kalopsis as Ben Palmer, a high school student
- Ramona Young as Tanner, Ben's best friend
- Keith David as Principal Henderson. David based his performance on the fictional character Theodore J. Mooney.
- Kate Flannery as a school cafeteria lunch lady
- Meredith Salenger as Julie Palmer, Ben's mother
- Jonathan Kimmel as Joe
- Nathan Janak as Phillip, a student who reports everything on social media
- Betsy Sodaro
- Romel De Silva as Sawyer Friedman, a nerdy student in Mrs. Wheeler's class

== Production ==
The Prank was announced on August 9, 2021, when it was reported that EGOT winner Rita Moreno would star alongside Connor Kalopsis, Ramona Young, Keith David, Meredith Salenger, Jonathan Kimmel, Nathan Janak, and Kate Flannery. Filming began in Los Angeles in August 2021.

== Release ==
The film premiered at the South by Southwest film festival on March 13, 2022. In February 2024, Iconic Events Releasing acquired distribution rights to the film, scheduling for a theatrical release on March 15 that year.

== Reception ==
On the review aggregator website Rotten Tomatoes, 41% of 22 critics' reviews are positive, with an average rating of 5.4/10.

Todd McCarthy at Deadline Hollywood criticized the performances, screenplay, and direction, calling it "unspeakably lame" and writing, "If you go to see this, The Prank's on you." The Hollywood Reporter's David Rooney noted its inconsistent tone, the chemistry between Kalopsis and Young, and Moreno's performance. Writing for Variety, Owen Gleiberman complimented Moreno's performance and the beginning, which he compared to the "good parts" of Don't Look Up, for starting "off as a fresh, funny riff on high-school society in the age of toxic cynicism". However, he criticized the twist for leaving "any true connection to the real world behind." In a positive review, Alexandra Heller-Nicholas of the Alliance of Women Film Journalists said some viewers would call it over-the-top, but that it was a "wild ride" that "puts the casual cruelty of youth in its crosshairs."
