= Dream Eater (film) =

2025 film by Drakulic, Drumm, and Williams

- Theatrical release poster
- Directed by: Jay Drakulic; Mallory Drumm; Alex Lee Williams
- Written by: Jay Drakulic; Mallory Drumm; Alex Lee Williams
- Produced by: Jay Drakulic; Mallory Drumm; Alex Lee Williams
- Starring: Alex Lee Williams; Mallory Drumm
- Cinematography: Michael Caterina
- Edited by: Vigo Vasquez
- Music by: Julian Stirpe
- Production companies: Blind Luck Pictures; Vortex Media
- Distributed by: The Horror Section
- Release date: October 24, 2025
- Running time: 90 minutes
- Country: Canada
- Language: English
- Budget: $100,000 (est.)

Dream Eater is a 2025 Canadian found footage horror film co-written and co-directed by Jay Drakulic, Mallory Drumm, and Alex Lee Williams. Produced by Blind Luck Pictures with support from Vortex Media, the film stars Drumm and Williams as a couple documenting a violent sleep disorder in a remote cabin. It was distributed by The Horror Section.

== Plot ==
Mallory, a documentary filmmaker, and her boyfriend Alex retreat to a cabin in the Laurentian Mountains to address Alex's severe parasomnia. At the suggestion of his therapist, Dr. Snape, Mallory films Alex's sleep patterns to monitor his condition. Alex reluctantly agrees after Dr. Snape warns that people with parasomnia have killed their partners while asleep. On their first night, Alex tells Mallory in his sleep, "He's under the house," but has no recollection of it the following morning.

As Alex becomes increasingly violent during his episodes and continues alluding to an unknown presence in the house, Mallory researches parasomnia and shows him an image of a Cthulhu-like entity, asking if it resembles what he sees in his dreams. She also learns of Dr. Armitage, a therapist specializing in parasomnia. When Alex refuses to contact him, Mallory speaks with Armitage alone by video call. He claims that Alex is not sleepwalking but is possessed by an entity known as Phobetor, the "Eater of Dreams." Mallory dismisses Armitage's claims as delusional, while Alex becomes furious upon discovering that she contacted him without his knowledge.

Mallory presses Alex about his traumatic childhood, but he refuses to discuss it. She calls his adoptive sister, Tammy, who reveals that his birth mother, Catherine Thorne, belonged to a cult. Mallory learns that Catherine worshiped Phobetor, became pregnant with Alex through rape, and murdered six people, including Alex's father, shortly before giving birth. When Mallory shares her findings, Alex berates her for investigating his past and accuses her of exploiting his trauma and condition for a documentary. Increasingly frightened, Mallory insists that they leave the next day, but Alex reveals that he has arranged to extend their stay by a week.

That night, Alex has another episode, destroying the kitchen and demanding that Mallory stop filming him. When she recounts the incident to Dr. Armitage, he points out that Alex's awareness of the camera contradicts her belief that he is in a dissociative state. Armitage explains that the cult sought to create a vessel for Phobetor who would become fully possessed upon turning thirty. A terrified Mallory reveals that it is Alex's thirtieth birthday.

Fully possessed by Phobetor, Alex chases Mallory through the house. She hides in a closet and stabs him in self-defense when he attacks her. Alex regains control of his body as Mallory calls 911 and tells her that it is too late for him, begging her to let him die. When Mallory says she cannot lose him, Alex replies, "You'll never lose me," before bleeding to death.

Some time later, Mallory takes a pregnancy test while listening to a voicemail from her filmmaking partner, who offers condolences for Alex's death but encourages her to make a film from the footage she recorded. Mallory discovers that she is pregnant. A naked, bloodied Alex suddenly appears in the doorway and repeats, "You'll never lose me," causing her to scream in terror.

== Cast ==
- Alex Lee Williams as Alex
- Mallory Drumm as Mallory

== Production ==
Dream Eater was produced by Blind Luck Pictures. The screenplay was influenced by the filmmakers' personal experiences with sleep disorders and research into violent parasomnia cases. Principal photography took place in March 2024 over a nine-day period in the Laurentian Mountains of Quebec.

== Release ==
The film premiered at the 29th Annual H.P. Lovecraft Film Festival in October 2024, where it was awarded Best Feature. It subsequently screened at genre festivals including the Unnamed Footage Festival and Beyond Fest.

In August 2025, Dream Eater was acquired for distribution by Eli Roth's The Horror Section. The film was released in approximately 350 theaters across North America on October 24, 2025, via Iconic Events in the United States and Vortex Media in Canada. A digital and video-on-demand release followed on November 18, 2025.

== Reception ==
On the review aggregator Rotten Tomatoes, Dream Eater holds an approval rating of approximately 68%. Critical commentary generally praised the film's atmosphere, sound design, and "Lovecraftian" narrative elements, drawing comparisons to The Blair Witch Project and Paranormal Activity.

== Awards ==
Drakulic, Drumm, and Williams received a nomination for the One to Watch Award at the Vancouver Film Critics Circle Awards 2025.
