= Benjamin Byron Davis =

American actor (born 1972)

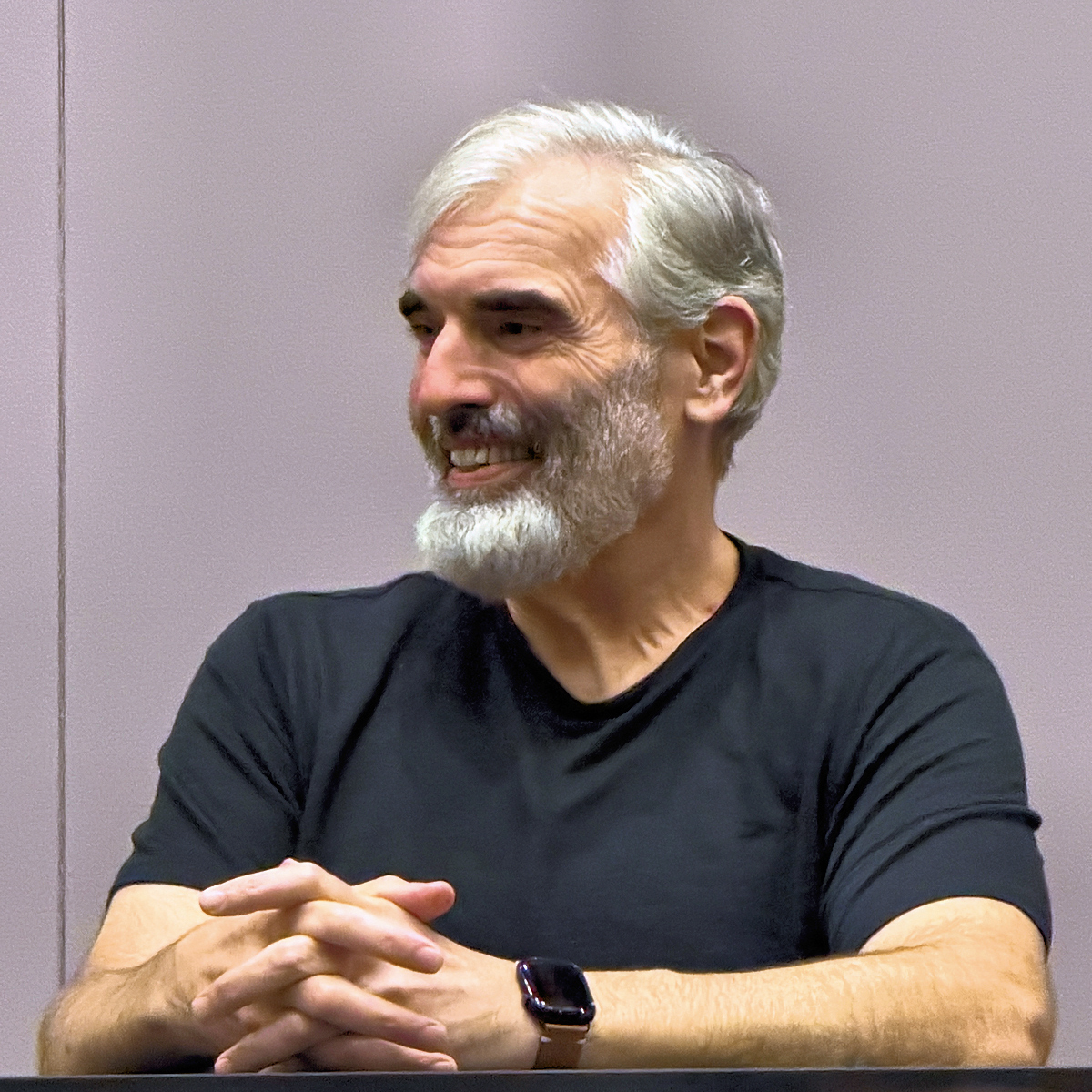
- Davis in 2026
- Born: June 21, 1972 (age 54); Boston, Massachusetts, U.S.
- Other name: Ben Davis
- Occupations: Actor; writer; director; acting coach
- Years active: 1998–present
- Website: benjaminbyrondavis.com

Benjamin Byron Davis (born June 21, 1972) is an American actor, writer, director, and acting coach. He is known for his performance as Dutch van der Linde in the video games Red Dead Redemption and Red Dead Redemption 2.

== Career ==
Davis has appeared primarily on television series, including Without a Trace, Criminal Minds, Gilmore Girls, Windfall, MADtv, Six Feet Under, among other series. In addition to television, he also performs on stage. In 2011, Davis directed the theatre production Awake. Davis voiced and provided performance capture for multiple characters in various Rockstar titles, and is best known for his role as Dutch van der Linde in Red Dead Redemption and Red Dead Redemption 2.

== Filmography ==
=== Film ===
Year	Title	Role	Notes
1998	Getting Personal	Bart	
1999	Flushed	Zeius (Drag Queen)	
2005	Black Eyed Sue	Osbourne Crawl	Short
2006	Lies & Alibis	Bartender	
2008	Miracle of Phil	Bartender	Short
2008	Q: Secret Agent	Agent Briggs	Short
2011	CIS: Las Gidi	Captain Regis	
2011	Talida	Radomir	Short
2012	Faded	Big Man	Short
2013	Somewhere Slow	Steve	
2015	I'm Patrick, and You're Insane	Dr. Gooch	Short
2016	The Belko Experiment	Antonio Fowler	
2018	Ant-Man and the Wasp	Agent Burleigh	
2023	Guardians of the Galaxy Vol. 3	Bletelsnort	
2024	Borderlands	Marcus	
2026	Ice Cream Man	The Priest	

=== Television ===
Year	Title	Role	Notes
1999	Chowdaheads	Buff Bagwell (voice)	Main cast
2002	Six Feet Under	Doctor	Episode: "Back to the Garden"
2002	Off Centre	Big Guy #2	Episode: "Addicted to Love"
2002	MADtv	Balloon Guy	Episode: "Episode #8.7"
2004	Las Vegas	James L. Nelson	Episode: "Catch of the Day"
2005	The Comeback	Red Carpet Coordinator	Episode: "Valerie Stands Out on the Red Carpet"
2006	Drake & Josh	Jerk in Line	Episode: "The Demonator"
2006	Related	Liquor Supplier #1	Episode: "Sisters Are Forever"
2006	Windfall	Lottery Winner	Episode: "There and Gone Again" & "Running with the Devil"
2006	Standoff	Clumsy Man	Episode: "Circling"
2006	Gilmore Girls	Tow Truck Driver	Episode: "The Long Morrow"
2007	Heroes	Linderman's Guard #2	Episode: "Chapter Nineteen '.07%'"
2008	Without a Trace	Dale Kinecki	Episode: "Better Angels"
2009	Criminal Minds	Burt Lang	Episode: "To Hell... And Back"
2010	NCIS: Los Angeles	Waiter	Episode: "Burned"
2010	Medium	Aaron Foley	Episode: "Smoke Damage"
2010	Sonny with a Chance	Savage Stan	Episode: "Marshall with a Chance"
2010	Desperate Housewives	Ex-Con	Episode: "Down the Block There's a Riot"
2010	Twentysixmiles	Police Officer (2008)	TV series
2011	Bones	Tariq Grazdani	Episode: "The Blackout in the Blizzard"
2011	Chuck	Villain	Episode: "Chuck Versus the Last Details"
2012	Up All Night	Man at Taco Stand	Episode: "Daddy Daughter Time"
2013	The Goodwin Games	Prison Guard	Episode: "Pilot"
2013	Ironside	Large Russian	Episode: "Action"
2014	How I Met Your Mother	Burly Guy	Episode: "Sunrise"
2014	Parks and Recreation	Foreman George	Episode: "The Wall"
2016	Rizzoli & Isles	Hank Mills	Episode: "Cops vs. Zombies"
2023	Fright Krewe	Malcolm Thibodeaux (voice)	Recurring cast (season 1)
2024	Creature Commandos	Rupert Thorne (voice)	Episode: "Priyatel Skelet"
2026	Terminal List	Andy Danreb	Episodes: "Every Bullet Has Its Destiny" & "Fathers and Sons"

=== Music video ===
Year	Song	Artist	Role
2016	"Low Life"	X Ambassadors (featuring Jamie N Commons & A$AP Ferg)	Bar Patron

=== Video games ===
Year	Title	Role
2004	Grand Theft Auto: San Andreas	Pedestrian / Radio Commercial
2010	Red Dead Redemption	Dutch van der Linde / Nastas
2011	L.A. Noire	Paul Kadarowski
2018	Red Dead Redemption 2	Dutch van der Linde
