= Power Ballad (film) =

2026 film by John Carney

- Theatrical release poster
- Directed by: John Carney
- Written by: John Carney; Peter McDonald
- Produced by: Anthony Bregman; John Carney; Peter Cron; Rebecca O'Flanagan; Robert Walpole
- Starring: Paul Rudd; Nick Jonas; Peter McDonald; Marcella Plunkett; Havana Rose Liu; Jack Reynor
- Cinematography: Yaron Orbach
- Edited by: Stephen O'Connell
- Music by: Gary Clark; John Carney
- Production companies: 30West; Screen Ireland; Likely Story; Distressed Films; Treasure Entertainment
- Distributed by: Lionsgate
- Release dates: March 1, 2026 (DIFF); May 29, 2026 (United States, Ireland and United Kingdom)
- Running time: 98 minutes
- Countries: United States; Ireland
- Language: English
- Budget: $10 million
- Box office: $3.4 million

Power Ballad is a 2026 musical comedy drama film directed by John Carney, written by Carney and Peter McDonald, and starring Paul Rudd, Nick Jonas, Havana Rose Liu, and Jack Reynor. The film follows wedding singer Rick (Rudd) who bonds with former boy-band member Danny (Jonas); when Danny uses Rick's song to reignite his own solo career, Rick sets out for the recognition he believes he deserves.

Power Ballad had its world premiere at the Dublin International Film Festival on March 1, 2026, and was released in select theaters on May 29, before expanding wide on June 5. The film received positive reviews from critics, praising the performances of Rudd and Jonas.

== Plot ==
Rick Power is the American lead singer in a Dublin-based wedding band, The Bride and Groove, who has given up his dreams of musical stardom after marrying his Irish girlfriend, Rachel, and having a daughter, Aja, with her. While performing at a castle wedding, the band meets Danny Wilson, a former boy band member who is struggling to find success as a solo artist. After joining the band onstage, Danny later spends the evening with Rick, during which they drink, smoke marijuana, and share music. Rick performs an original song he wrote, "How to Write a Song (Without You)".

After returning to Los Angeles, Danny struggles to find material for his solo album, and his producer, Mac, criticizes his songs as generic. Trying to find inspiration, Danny plays Rick's song which his girlfriend, Marcia, overhears and encourages him to record and release. Six months later, the song becomes a major hit and revives Danny's career. After hearing it while shopping, Rick attempts to convince others that he wrote the song, but is unable to prove it. Danny's record label dismisses Rick's claims and threatens legal action if he continues contacting them.

When a bride requests the song at a wedding, Rick refuses to perform it and is fired from the band after attacking the drummer. After crashing his van with Rachel and Aja both inside, Rachel kicks him out of the house. Desperate to receive credit, Rick convinces his bandmate, Sandy, to come with him to Los Angeles. The two attend Danny's concert at the L.A. Forum and sneak into the afterparty at his home. Rick confronts Danny and demands recognition for writing the song, but Danny refuses. Rick reveals that the song is not a love song, but a song written for Aja about fatherhood. Rick and Sandy are then kicked out of the party.

Returning to Ireland, Rick accepts that he is unlikely to receive credit and reconciles with his family and rejoins The Bride and Groove. Later, Rick and Danny each perform the song separately, Rick at a wedding, and Danny at Madison Square Garden. While looking through old photographs and videos on Rick's computer, Aja discovers a home video from when she was two years old that shows Rick singing the song to her, providing proof that he wrote the song. Several months later, Rick donates a large amount of money to a busker, showing that he was finally compensated for his work.

== Cast ==
- Paul Rudd as Rick
- Nick Jonas as Danny Wilson
- Peter McDonald as Sandy
- Marcella Plunkett as Rachel
- Havana Rose Liu as Marcia
- Jack Reynor as Mac
- Rory Keenan as Binzer
- Keith McErlean as Kyle
- Paul Reid as Bernie
- Beth Fallon as Aja

== Production ==
It was announced in May 2024 that John Carney had begun production in Dublin on his next film, which would see Paul Rudd and Nick Jonas cast to star. Jack Reynor would join the cast later that month. In June, Havana Rose Liu was added to the cast.

The film was co-financed by Media Capital Technologies.

== Music ==
Power Ballad

Soundtrack album by Nick Jonas and Paul Rudd
- Released: May 31, 2026
- Label: Republic

Nick Jonas albums chronology
Sunday Best (2026)	Power Ballad (2026)

Along with an original song titled "How to Write a Song Without You", the movie features covers of classic tracks by Bryan Adams and Thin Lizzy, performed by Jonas and Rudd.

Power Ballad (Music From The Motion Picture) track listing
No.	Title	Writer(s)	Artist(s)	Length
1.	"How to Write a Song Without You" (pop version)	Gary Clark; John Carney	Nick Jonas	3:17
2.	"Celebration"	Claydes Smith; Dennis Thomas; Earl Toon, Jr.; Eumir Deodato; George Brown; James Taylor; Robert Bell; Robert Mickens; Ronald Bell	Paul Rudd	3:43
3.	"Summer of '69"	Bryan Adams; James Vallance	Paul Rudd	3:10
4.	"The Power of Love"	Huey Lewis; Christopher Hayes; John Colla	Paul Rudd	3:48
5.	"Finishing Line"	Gary Clark; John Carney	Paul Rudd	2:50
6.	"Fun Won't Matter"	Gary Clark; John Carney	Nick Jonas	2:29
7.	"The Boys Are Back in Town"	Phil Lynott	Paul Rudd	4:33
8.	"I Wish"	Stevie Wonder	Nick Jonas and Paul Rudd	3:26
9.	"Don't Look Down"	Gary Clark; John Carney	Nick Jonas	3:37
10.	"Spectacular"	Nick Jonas; Gary Clark	Nick Jonas	3:03
11.	"Satellite"	Gary Clark; John Carney	Paul Rudd	3:13
12.	"How to Write a Song Without You" (Nick Jonas version)	Gary Clark; John Carney	Nick Jonas	3:21
13.	"Message in a Bottle"	Gordon Sumner	Paul Rudd	4:06
14.	"1984"	Gary Clark; John Carney	Nick Jonas	3:14
15.	"Maneater"	Sara Allen; Daryl F. Hall; John William Oates	Paul Rudd	4:16
16.	"How to Write a Song Without You" (Paul Rudd version)	Gary Clark; John Carney	Paul Rudd	3:55
17.	"Dublin to L.A."	Gary Clark; John Carney	Paul Rudd	4:00
Total length:				56:11

== Release ==
Power Ballad had its world premiere at the Dublin International Film Festival at the Closing Night Gala section on March 1, 2026, which was followed by its premiere at the 2026 South by Southwest Film & TV Festival on March 14, and was the closing feature film at the 50th Cleveland International Film Festival on April 18. The film also was the opening film for Sands International Film Festival in St Andrews, Scotland on April 17th. It was also featured on closing night of the 27th BAFICI on April 26. The film was released in select theaters on May 29, before expanding wide on June 5. The film was also released in the United Kingdom and Ireland on May 29.

== Reception ==
On the review aggregator website Rotten Tomatoes, 88% of 192 critics' reviews are positive, with an average rating of 7.3/10. The website's consensus reads: "Paul Rudd and Nick Jonas prove to be harmonious screen partners in Power Ballad, a mellow dramedy that acknowledges the allure and pitfalls of stardom with equal measures of grace." Metacritic, which uses a weighted average, assigned the film a score of 67 out of 100, based on 35 critics, indicating "generally favorable" reviews.
