= Eli Roth =

American film director and screenwriter (born 1972)

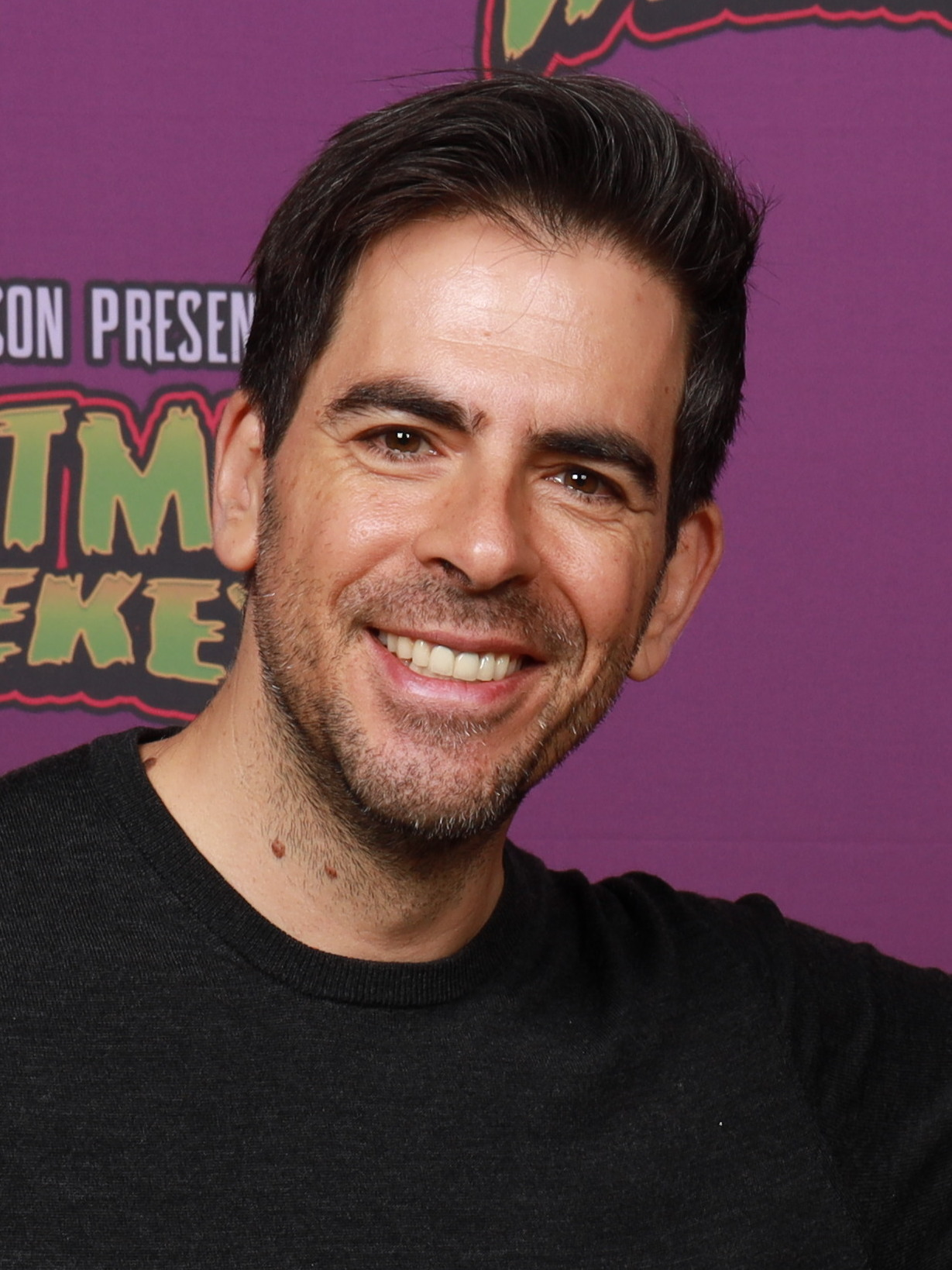
- Roth in 2025
- Born: Eli Raphael Roth; April 18, 1972 (age 54); Newton, Massachusetts, U.S.
- Education: New York University
- Occupations: Film director; screenwriter; producer; actor
- Years active: 1996–present
- Spouse: Lorenza Izzo (m. 2014; div. 2019)
- Children: 1

Eli Raphael Roth (born April 18, 1972) is an American film director, screenwriter, producer, and actor. As a director and producer, he is most closely associated with the horror genre, namely splatter films, having directed Cabin Fever (2002) and Hostel (2005).

Roth continued to work in the horror genre, directing films like Hostel: Part II (2007), The Green Inferno (2013) and Thanksgiving (2023). He also expanded into other genres, directing the erotic thriller film Knock Knock (2015), the action film remake Death Wish (2018), the fantasy film The House with a Clock in Its Walls (2018), and the action-comedy Borderlands (2024). As an actor, Roth starred as Donny "The Bear Jew" Donowitz in Quentin Tarantino's war film Inglourious Basterds (2009), for which he received a Critic's Choice Movie Award and a Screen Actors Guild Award as part of the ensemble.

Many journalists have included him in a group of filmmakers dubbed the Splat Pack for their explicitly violent and controversially bloody horror films. In 2013, Roth received the Visionary Award for his contributions to horror at the Stanley Film Festival.

In 2025, Roth founded The Horror Section in partnership with Media Capital Technologies.

== Early life ==
Roth was born the middle of three sons in Newton, Massachusetts, to Sheldon Roth, a psychiatrist/psychoanalyst and clinical professor at Harvard Medical School, and Cora Roth, a painter. He has an older brother, Adam (born 1970), and a younger brother, Gabriel (born 1974). Roth was raised Jewish (his ancestors were Jewish immigrants from Austria, Hungary, Russia, and Poland). In addition to English, he speaks French, Italian, and basic Russian.

Roth began shooting films at the age of eight, after watching Ridley Scott's Alien (1979). He and his brothers, Adam and Gabriel, made more than 100 short films before he graduated from Newton South High School and attended film school (the Tisch School of the Arts) at New York University. To fund his films while in college, Roth claims to have worked as an online cybersex operator for Penthouse Magazine, posing as a woman, as well as a production assistant on feature films. Roth also ran the office of producer Frederick Zollo, leaving after graduation to devote himself to writing full-time. He collected unemployment and found work on Howard Stern's Private Parts as Stern's assistant, staying at Silvercup Studios in Queens at night working on his scripts while Stern slept.

Actress Camryn Manheim gave Roth one of his first Hollywood jobs, as an extra on The Practice, when he moved to Los Angeles. Roth would stay in Manheim's dressing room, working on his scripts, while she filmed the show. The two had become friends in New York, while Roth was working for Zollo. Roth also met Manheim's cousin Howie Nuchow (former EVP of Mandalay Sports Entertainment and also from the Boston area) at her family Passover seder—this led to Roth's first animation project, Chowdaheads, the following year. Roth also co-wrote a project called The Extra with Manheim, who later sold the pitch to producer (and former CEO and chairman of Fox Studios) Bill Mechanic's Pandemonium company.

== Career ==
=== 1991–2001: Early work and Cabin Fever ===
At NYU film school, Roth wrote and directed a student film called Restaurant Dogs, an homage to Quentin Tarantino's Reservoir Dogs. The film was nominated for a Student Academy Award in 1995, ultimately winning its division (Division III). Through his internship with Frederick Zollo, Roth met David Lynch and remained in touch over the years, eventually producing content for Lynch with his fledgling website in the late 1990s. Through Lynch, Roth met film and TV composer Angelo Badalamenti, whose music he used in his first feature film. He also met a member of special effects company KNB EFX, which contributed to his first feature. In 1999, Roth moved to Los Angeles, where he wrote, directed, edited, produced, animated, and provided voices for a series of animated shorts called Chowdaheads for Mandalay Sports Entertainment. They were to be shown between WCW Monday Nitro pro wrestling matches, but they were never actually broadcast. Roth's friend Noah Belson co-wrote the shorts and provided the other character voices.

In mid-2000, with financing from the website Z.com to deliver a five-minute pilot, Roth wrote, directed, animated, and produced a series of stop-motion shorts called The Rotten Fruit. The company folded after several episodes were done, and its domain name was picked up by Nissan for its "Z" sports car. A portion of Roth's work for The Rotten Fruit was done at the Snake Pit studios in Burbank with miniature sets, posable clay, foam figures, two high-end digital still cameras, and a pair of Macintosh computers. Noah Belson co-wrote The Rotten Fruit along with Roth. Roth had co-written Cabin Fever with his college roommate Randy Pearlstein. They based the premise on Roth's experience of contracting a skin infection while riding ponies at a family friend's farm in Iceland in 1991. Much of it was written in 1996, while Roth worked as a production assistant for Howard Stern's film Private Parts.

Cabin Fever was produced in 2001 on a budget of $1.5 million raised from private investors. The film was sold to Lionsgate at the 2002 Toronto International Film Festival for $3.5 million, the biggest sale of that year's festival. Released in 2003, it was Lionsgate's highest-grossing film of the year, earning $22 million at the U.S. box office and $35 million worldwide. Lionsgate's stock rose from $1.98 a share to nearly $6 a share after the film was released; the company used its newly valuable stock to buy Artisan Entertainment. Cabin Fever made Roth a star in the horror genre. In a 2004 Premiere Magazine interview, Quentin Tarantino called it "the best new American film". Cabin Fever was remade in 2016 and directed by Travis Zariwny.

=== 2005–2007: Hostel films and Thanksgiving ===
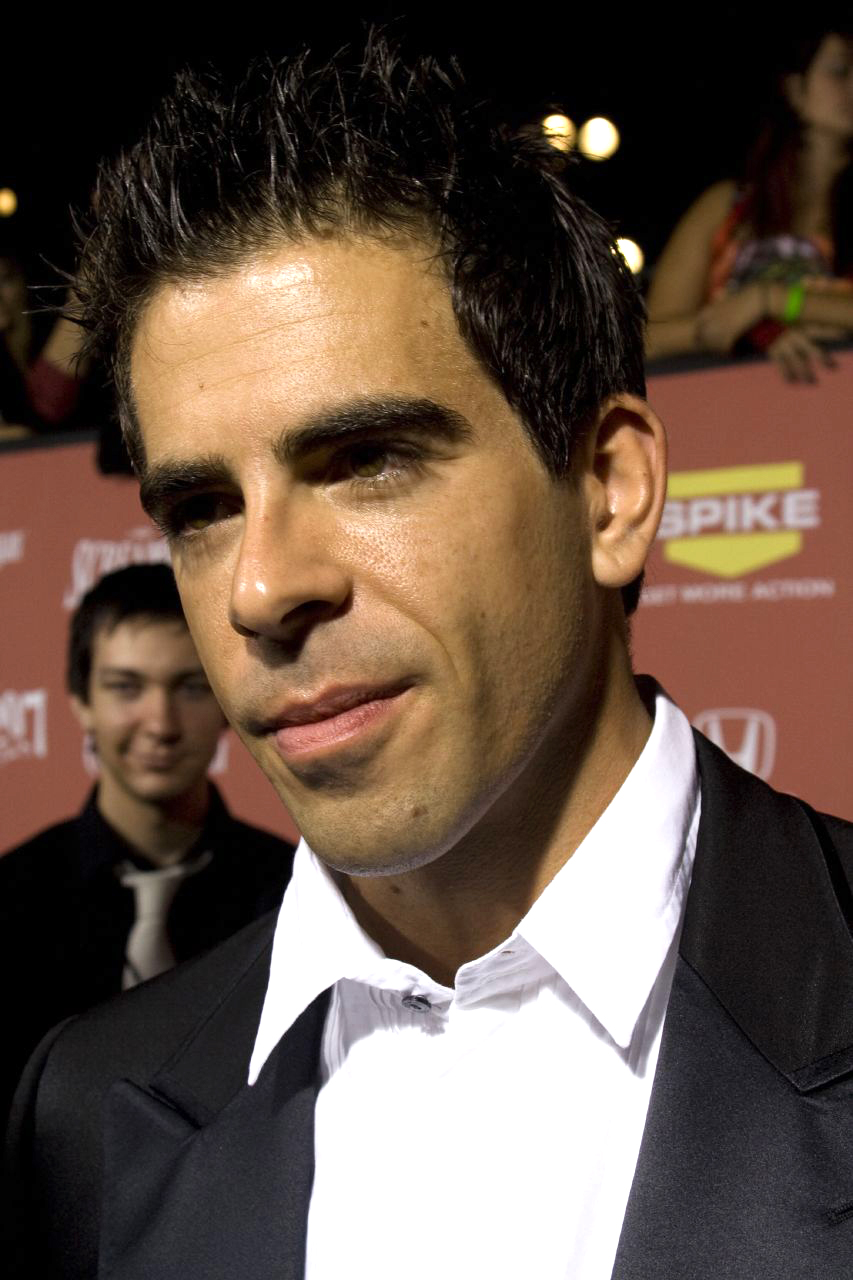
Roth at the Spike TV Scream Awards, 2007

In 2005, Roth's second feature, Hostel, was made for just over $4 million. It opened No. 1 at the box office in January 2006, taking in $20 million its first weekend. The film went on to gross $80 million worldwide in box office, and more than $180 million on DVD. Although the story is set in Slovakia, all the exteriors were shot in the Czech Republic. In the film, three friends are lured to visit a hostel where they think their sexual fantasies will come true. Instead, they fall into the clutches of an international syndicate that provides first-hand torture and killing experiences for rich, sadistic tourists. The film was rated No. 1 on Bravo TV's 30 Even Scarier Movie Moments, and Empire Magazine readers voted Hostel the Best Horror Film of 2007.

Roth reportedly turned down studio directing jobs to make Hostel. He took a directing salary of only $10,000 to keep the budget as low as possible, so there would be no limits set on its violence. In January 2006, film critic David Edelstein in New York magazine credited Roth with creating the horror subgenre "torture porn", or "gorno", using excessive violence to excite audiences like a sexual act.

In 2007, Roth directed and narrated the faux trailer segment Thanksgiving for Grindhouse and appeared in Death Proof, Tarantino's segment of the film. Roth and co-writer Jeff Rendell won a 2007 Spike TV Scream Award for best "screamplay" for their work in Grindhouse, sharing the honor with Tarantino, Robert Rodriguez, Rob Zombie, and Edgar Wright. In January 2023, it was announced Roth is developing a feature-length film version of Thanksgiving.

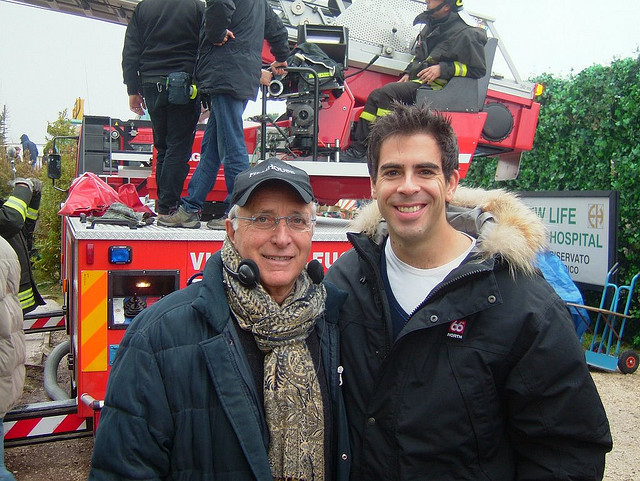
Eli Roth with Ruggero Deodato in Rome during the press tour of Hostel (2006)

Hostel: Part II opened in sixth place in June 2007, with $8.2 million; it went on to gross $17.6 million in US theaters. The film, which cost $10.2 million, earned $35 million in theaters worldwide and $50 million on DVD and pay television. Lionsgate attributed the lower grosses to the summer release, opposite blockbusters such as Shrek the Third, Pirates of the Caribbean: At World's End, and Ocean's Thirteen, as well as the film's workprint having been leaked online before its release. Close to two million illegal workprint downloads were tracked the day Hostel 2 opened.

I don't know if it was the most downloaded film of all time, but there are tracking services that track what movies are being downloaded. And a copy of Hostel 2 leaked out before its release and they had it, it was like millions and millions of hits. Not only was it downloaded, but in the countries it was downloaded – like Mexico and Brazil – there were copies on the street for practically a penny. You could buy Hostel 2 for a quarter in Mexico City. As a result, in a lot of countries where the piracy was bad, they just didn't even release it.

Hostel: Part II was nominated for six Spike TV Scream Awards, including best horror film and best director. It was on Entertainment Weekly's list of the 20 best horror films of the past 20 years. In March 2006, Dimension Films bought the rights to Cell by Stephen King and would produce a film to be directed by Roth. In 2009, King finished the screenplay, and actors John Cusack and Samuel L. Jackson joined the project; however, Roth did not direct.

=== 2009–present: Career fluctuations ===
In 2009, while acting in Inglourious Basterds, Roth said that he would soon begin his next film, Endangered Species. He has also produced the 2012 kung fu film The Man with the Iron Fists, written, directed, and scored by RZA who also stars in the film. According to Roth, Tarantino is involved as well. In an interview with CHUD, Roth said, "This movie will have everything martial-arts fans could want, combined with RZA's superb musical talent. This project has been his dream for years, and I'm thrilled to be a part of it. Fans should know that, yes, there will be blood ... This ain't no PG-13.

Through his company, Arcade, with Eric Newman and Strike producer Marc Abraham, Roth produced the horror film The Last Exorcism, (originally titled Cotton) which was directed by Daniel Stamm. Completed in December 2009 and retitled in February 2010, The Last Exorcism cost $1.5 million to produce. It opened at more than $20 million in U.S. sales, and earned No. #1 opening spots in Canada and the UK. The film had paid for itself when rights in a few foreign territories were sold before shooting began. It earned over $40 million box office in the United States, and $70 million worldwide.

In 2014, Roth produced the American supernatural horror film Clown and had the minor role of "Frowny the Clown." He next helmed Knock Knock (2015), a remake of the 1974-shot horror film Death Game, about two women who seduce a married man and then do unspeakable things to him. Keanu Reeves starred and executive produced.

I can't say anything without giving anything away! ... I saw Transformers and Cloverfield and thought, 'I have an idea for a mass destruction movie.' But it's going to be very different from those films. And it's science fiction, but a little more grounded than that.

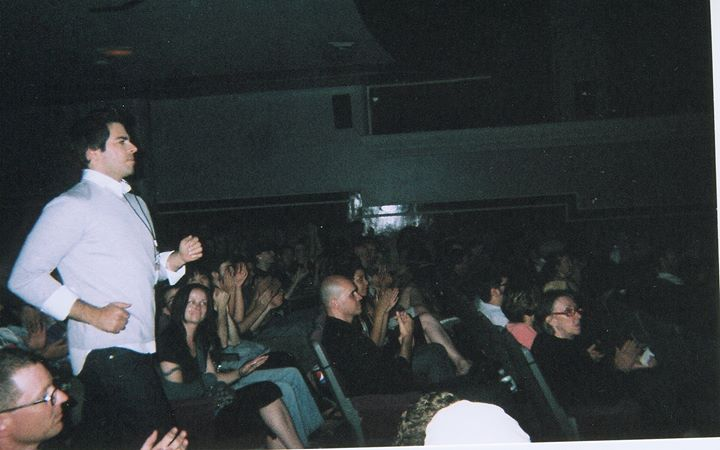
Roth at the Toronto After Dark Film Festival, 2010

In a 2013 interview with The Guardian, Roth indicated that he had suspended work on Endangered Species to focus on 2013's The Green Inferno. Roth directed the cannibal horror film The Green Inferno (2013), which was inspired by his love of Mondo horror films such as the infamous Cannibal Holocaust. The Green Inferno was criticized for its portrayal of indigenous people as cannibals, and it was described as a "new low in racist film making" by People's World. In 2015, Roth was announced as the director of the adaptation of the best-selling shark novel Meg: A Novel of Deep Terror, eventually called The Meg. In 2016, it was announced that he had left the project due to creative differences.

Roth hosted and executive-produced an episode of Discovery Channel's TV series Curiosity, titled "How Evil Are You?" The episode explored the scientific aspects of evil, with Roth undergoing a brain scan and DNA sequencing at University of California, Davis with neuropsychiatrist Dr. James Fallon. Roth also re-created the infamous Milgram experiments for the documentary, with results identical to those from 50 years earlier. Roth directed the pilot of Hemlock Grove, a horror/thriller series, that premiered on Netflix on April 19, 2013. He also hosts Shark After Dark on Discovery Channel's Shark Week. Roth helped with a project with DreamWorks' TV show Fright Krewe.

Roth's 2018 remake of the film Death Wish opened to $13 million at the box office. The film is centered around a trauma surgeon who turns to vigilantism after his family is attacked. The film was panned by critics as "pro-gun propaganda" and ill-timed in the wake of the Stoneman Douglas High School shooting. Roth defended the film, stating that the film was not pro-gun and that he wanted the film to focus on family, protecting one's family, and seeking justice for one's family. Also in 2018, he directed the fantasy comedy film The House with a Clock in Its Walls, his first PG-rated film and his highest domestic grosser to date.

In 2024, Roth wrote and directed an adaptation of the Borderlands games.

=== Other ventures ===
In 2002, Roth brought a shot-for-shot remake of Raiders of the Lost Ark made by children to the attention of both Harry Knowles and Steven Spielberg. He had a copy in his video collection for years, and showed it at Knowles's Butt-Numb-A-Thon film festival in December. The response was so great that Roth took the tape to his first meeting at DreamWorks to give to Spielberg. An executive called the next week saying that Spielberg loved it and wanted to contact the filmmakers. Roth had never met them, but Google-searched every name in the credits until he found Jayson Lamb, the cinematographer. The three filmmakers—Lamb, Chris Strompolis, and Eric Zala (a former Activision employee)—had not spoken to each other in years when Roth contacted them. Roth, feeling that their film was so powerful he had to do whatever he could to make sure fans saw it, introduced it at its premiere at Grauman's Chinese Theatre in May 2008, five and a half years after he first gave the tape to Knowles. Soon, the three reunited friends were touring the world, doing charity screenings.

Roth has talked of doing Trailer Trash, another compilation of fake trailers. "Trailer Trash is not a horror film," he said; "it's a comedy. It will be very R-rated and completely insane, and I'm producing it with Mike Fleiss". Roth recorded an audio commentary for Troma's 1997 DVD release of Blood Sucking Freaks four years before directing his first film, billed as a "Blood and Guts Expert". Roth is a frequent contributor to DVD "extras" content (liner notes, video commentary) for horror film distributors Grindhouse Releasing/Box Office Spectaculars, particularly for two of his favorite films Juan Piquer Simón's Pieces and the North American DVD release of Lucio Fulci's Cat in the Brain.

Roth's most notable appearance to date is his role as violent Bostonian soldier Donny "The Bear Jew" Donowitz in the 2009 Quentin Tarantino film Inglourious Basterds. Roth's role in Quentin Tarantino's segment of the 2007 film Grindhouse, Death Proof, came about because Tarantino was impressed by Roth's brief part as Justin in Cabin Fever. Roth—who left pre-production on Hostel: Part II in Prague and flew to Austin, Texas, to film the scene at the Texas Chili Parlor—said that working as an actor for Tarantino is "like taking a master class in directing". Outside of these films and his own, Roth has appeared in a cameo role as a contest emcee in Alexandre Aja's 2010 film Piranha 3D and in the 2012 musical film Rock of Ages, among others. Roth has also appeared in several projects that David Lynch directed for his website. In 2009, Roth wrote, directed, and acted in a PSA for People for the Ethical Treatment of Animals (PETA) about the link between violence against animals and violence against people. Roth won a Telly Award for his spot (Public Service Category: Bronze). Roth is a curator of the Museum of Pop Culture's exhibit "Can't Look Away", detailing the history of horror. He was selected, along with directors John Landis and Roger Corman, to represent three generations of film directors who have shaped the genre.

In September 2012, he opened a haunted house, Eli Roth's Goretorium, in Las Vegas. Haunted Desert LLC, which owns Goretorium, filed for bankruptcy protection in July 2013, and the attraction closed in October. Roth directed the music video for Snoop Lion's lead single "La La La" from his reggae-genre album Reincarnated, which was released on April 23, 2013. In 2015, Roth partnered with Jack Davis to launch Crypt TV, a digital company focused on short-form horror content. In 2021, Roth invested in Jomboy Media, a digital media company that produces content focused on sports and pop culture.

== Activism ==
In August 2015, Roth partnered with news website Mongabay and fundraising platform Prizeo for a fundraising campaign that aimed to raise awareness about the Amazon rainforest. The announcement was made after advocacy group Amazon Watch criticized Roth's film The Green Inferno as racist and "promoting retrograde stereotypes of indigenous peoples as savages that enable policies detrimental to the survival of isolated Amazonian indigenous peoples."

Since the release of his 2021 documentary Fin, Roth has advocated to end shark fishing and to discourage the use of shark liver oil. In the 2022 Environmental Media Association (EMA) Media Summit, Roth spoke of the five years he spent making Fin, which he made to combat what he characterized as "fear propaganda" about sharks. He told The Hollywood Reporter in 2023, "My goal is if I can make Fin a totally obsolete movie, that nothing in it is relevant anymore because it's all been fixed." Roth spoke again at the 2025 EMA Summit.

=== Israel ===
Roth has been a vocal supporter of Israel following the 2023 October 7 attacks. Soon after the attacks, Roth likened Hamas to Nazis in an Instagram post of a photo of his character from Inglourious Basterds, and urged people to support Israel. He signed open letters related to the subsequent Gaza war, including one condemning Hamas and calling for the return of the hostages taken captive, and one criticizing the Writers Guild of America for failing to condemn the October 7 attacks.

In March 2024, Roth signed an open letter denouncing Jonathan Glazer's Oscars acceptance speech for The Zone of Interest, in which he criticized the dehumanization of victims of "the ongoing attack on Gaza". In June 2025, Roth said that activist Greta Thunberg "needs to be eaten by cannibals" after the Gaza Freedom Flotilla she was a part of was detained by the Israeli Navy while attempting to deliver aid to the Gaza Strip. He added, "If you posted Greta's antisemitic propaganda, you are dead to me."

== Personal life ==
Roth married Chilean actress and model Lorenza Izzo in November 2014, on the beach of the Chilean town Zapallar. The couple announced their separation in July 2018. Their divorce was finalized in August 2019. He later married Italian costume designer Vittoria Buraschi with whom he has one daughter.

Roth bought his first home when he was 35, following the success of Hostel: Part II. In 2024, he moved to another home in the same neighborhood following the birth of his child.

== Filmography ==
=== Film ===
Year	Title	Director	Writer	Producer	Notes
2002	Cabin Fever	Yes	Yes	Yes	
2005	Hostel	Yes	Yes	Yes	
2007	Hostel: Part II	Yes	Yes	Yes	
2007	Grindhouse: Thanksgiving	Yes	Yes	No	Fake trailer
2012	Aftershock	No	Yes	Yes	
2012	The Man with the Iron Fists	No	Yes	Co-producer	
2013	The Green Inferno	Yes	Yes	Yes	
2015	Knock Knock	Yes	Yes	Yes	
2016	Cabin Fever	No	Yes	Executive	
2018	Death Wish	Yes	No	No	
2018	The House with a Clock in Its Walls	Yes	No	No	
2021	Fin	Yes	No	Yes	Documentary
2023	Thanksgiving	Yes	Story	Yes	
2024	Borderlands	Yes	Yes	No	
2026	Ice Cream Man	Yes	Yes	Yes	
TBA	Don't Go in That House, B****!	Yes	Yes	Yes	Pre-production
TBA	Thanksgiving 2	Yes	Yes	Yes	Pre-production

As producer

- 2001 Maniacs (2005)
- The Last Exorcism (2010)
- The Last Exorcism Part II (2013)
- The Sacrament (2013)
- The Stranger (2014)
- Clown (2014)
- Haunt (2019)
- Stiletto (2026)

As executive producer

- The Man with the Iron Fists 2 (2015)
- Jimmy and Stiggs (2024)
- Dream Eater (2025)

As co-producer

- Baywatch (2017)

=== Television ===
Year	Title	Director	Executive producer	Notes
2000	The Rotten Fruit	Yes	Yes	Creator and co-writer
2013–15	Hemlock Grove	Yes	Yes	Directed episode "Pilot"
2015	South of Hell	Yes	Yes	Directed episode "Pilot"
2018–2021	Eli Roth's History of Horror	No	Yes	Himself (host)
2022	Urban Legend	No	Yes	Interviewer
2023	Fright Krewe	No	Yes	Creator

=== Acting roles ===
Year	Title	Role	Notes
1997	The Lost World: Jurassic Park	Subway Man	Uncredited
1999	Terror Firmer	Shocked Onlooker	
1999	Thank You, Judge	Boyfriend	Music video
2000	Citizen Toxie: The Toxic Avenger IV	Frightened citizen	
2002	Cabin Fever	Justin aka Grim	
2004	Tales from the Crapper	Gay Party-goer	
2005	2001 Maniacs	Justin	
2005	Hostel	American Stoner	Cameo
2006	Southland Tales	Man who gets shot on toilet	Cameo (uncredited)
2007	Hostel: Part II	Head on stick	Cameo
2007	Death Proof	Dov	
2007	Grindhouse: Thanksgiving	Tucker/Trailer Announcer	Fake trailer
2009	Inglourious Basterds	Donny "The Bear Jew" Donowitz	
2009	Don't Look Up	Béla Olt	
2010	Piranha 3D	Wet T-shirt contest MC	Cameo
2011	Scream: The Inside Story	Himself	Documentary film
2012	Rock of Ages	Stefano	Cameo
2012	Aftershock	Gringo	
2012	The Man with the Iron Fists	Wolf Clan #2	Cameo
2014	Clown	Frowny the Clown	
2017	78/52	Himself	Documentary
2018	The House with a Clock in Its Walls	Comrade Ivan	
2019	Godzilla: King of the Monsters	Fighter Pilot	Uncredited
2019	QT8: The First Eight	Himself	Documentary
2022	Poppy Playtime: Chapter 2	Jimmy Roth	Video game
2023	The Idol	Andrew Finkelstein	TV series, guest role
2025	Night Always Comes	Blake	
2026	Euphoria	"Batman"	TV series, guest role
2026	Ice Cream Man	Marty	

== Critical reception ==
Year	Title	Rotten Tomatoes	Metacritic
2002	Cabin Fever	62%	56
2005	Hostel	60%	55
2007	Hostel: Part II	44%	46
2007	Grindhouse: Thanksgiving	84%	77
2013	The Green Inferno	39%	38
2015	Knock Knock	37%	53
2018	Death Wish	17%	31
2018	The House with a Clock in Its Walls	65%	57
2021	Fin	82%	N/A
2023	Thanksgiving	83%	63
2024	Borderlands	10%	26
2026	Ice Cream Man	29%	39
