= Iconic Events =

American film distribution company

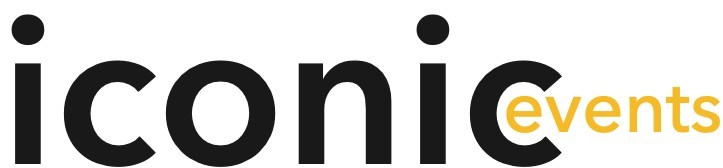
- Type: Private
- Industry: Film
- Founded: 2020
- Founder: Michael Lambert; Tim Warner; Mark Rupp; Steven Menkin
- Headquarters: Los Angeles, California
- Area served: United States; Canada
- Website: iconicreleasing.com

Iconic Events is an American event cinema and film distribution company founded in 2020 by Michael Lambert, former Cinemark CEO Tim Warner, Mark Rupp, and Steven Menkin. The company offers a variety of live and captured entertainment events in movie theaters nationwide. Iconic offers extra features, audience Q&As, backstage footage, interviews with cast and crew, and more. Theatrical releases range from live sports (UFC Live) to classic anime (AX Cinema Nights) to music (David Byrne, David Bowie), documentaries (The Lost Weekend), horror films (Terrifier franchise), and faith-focused features (God of Heaven and Earth).

== History ==
Iconic Events was founded in 2020 by Michael Lambert, Tim Warner, Mark Rupp, and Steven Menkin.

== Filmography ==
- American Utopia (2021)
- Bo Burnham: Inside (2021)
- Lindsey Stirling: Home for the Holidays (2021)
- The Mitchells vs. the Machines (2021)
- Pinkfong and Baby Shark's Space Adventure (2021)
- SummerSlam (2021)
- Block Party (2022)
- Jeen-Yuhs (2022)
- Superspreader (2022)
- Terrifier 2 (2022)
- Monty Python and the Holy Grail 48th-and-a-half anniversary (2023)
- Cinderella's Revenge (2024)
- Don't Tell Mom the Babysitter's Dead (2024)
- The Prank (2024)
- Stream (2024)
- Terrifier 3 (2024)
- Dogma Resurrected!: A 25th Anniversary Celebration (2025)
- Peter Pan's Neverland Nightmare (2025)
- Screamboat (2025)
- Silent Night, Deadly Night (2025)
- The Toxic Avenger (2025)
- Ice Cream Man (2026)
- Return to Silent Hill (2026)
- Signing Tony Raymond (2026)
