= Jackson Stewart (film director) =

American screenwriter and film director

- Born: Jackson Stewart; February 17, 1985 (age 41); Tucson, Arizona, U.S.
- Occupations: Film director, screenwriter, producer
- Years active: 2009–present
- Notable work: Beyond the Gates; Supernatural

Jackson Stewart (born February 17, 1985) is an American film director, producer, and screenwriter. He is best known for directing Beyond the Gates (2016).

== Early life ==
Stewart was born in Tucson, Arizona.

== Career ==
In 2010, Stewart became director Stuart Gordon's personal assistant.

Stewart wrote the Frontierland episode of Supernatural.

Stewart directed Beyond the Gates (2016) starring Barbara Crampton, Chase Williamson, Graham Skipper, and Brea Grant.

In 2018, Stewart announced that he will direct The Day After Halloween on the Shock Waves podcast.

Stewart is currently developing a sequel to Beyond the Gates (2016) with Brian Yuzna.

== Filmography ==
Film

| Year | Title | Writer | Director | Producer |
|---|---|---|---|---|
| 2016 | Beyond the Gates | Yes | Yes | Yes |

Television

| Year | Title | Episode | Writer | Director | Producer |
|---|---|---|---|---|---|
| 2011 | Supernatural | "Frontierland" (S6E18) | story | No | No |
