= Aaron B. Koontz =

American writer, director and producer

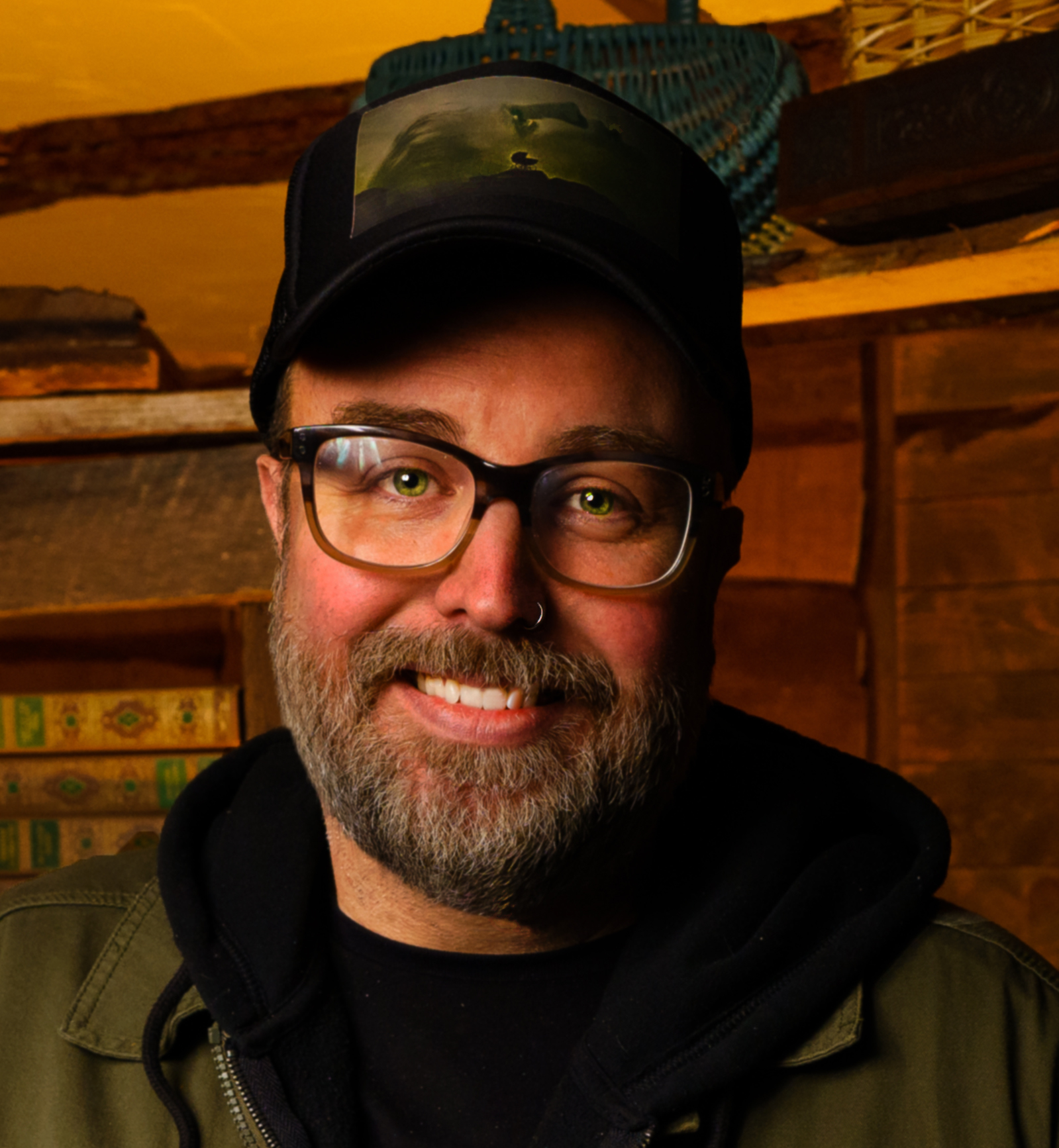
- Koontz in 2021
- Born: Indianapolis, Indiana
- Citizenship: American
- Occupations: Screenwriter; Director; Producer
- Years active: 2014–present
- Notable work: The Pale Door; Scare Package; Shelby Oaks; Scare Package II: Rad Chad's Revenge

Aaron B. Koontz is an American producer, writer, and director. He is the founder and CEO of Paper Street Pictures, a film production company based in Austin, Texas. He is also a producer for the Scare Package franchise, The Pale Door, Shelby Oaks, and the upcoming The Mandela Catalogue film, and serves as the creator and showrunner of the television series Revival.

== Early life and education ==
Koontz was born in Indianapolis, Indiana. As a child, he shot home movies and wrote numerous short stories.

After moving to Florida with his family he went on to attend Full Sail University, where he was a classmate of filmmakers Adam Wingard and E. L. Katz. Koontz graduated in 2001 and worked as freelance crew on various film sets including Monster and studio films The Punisher and Out of Time. Aaron was inducted into the Full Sail University Hall of Fame as part of its 15th annual induction class in early 2025.

== Career ==
In 2003, Koontz took a nearly ten-year detour where he worked in video game production as a producer and QA tester-manager for companies like EA Sports, THQ and Zynga. In 2012, Koontz left games to start the boutique genre production company Paper Street Pictures. Through Paper Street, Koontz wrote and directed multiple short films including the award-winning Honor Student. In 2014, Koontz was an executive producer of the SXSW hit Starry Eyes, and then in 2016, he co-wrote, produced and directed his first feature film, Camera Obscura, for NBC Universal. In 2019, Koontz lead the production team for the Shudder cult hit Scare Package, of which he also was the core story co-writer and director as well as the final segment director with Horror Hypothesis. In 2020, Aaron co-wrote, directed and produced The Pale Door, a horror-western he released with the help of executive producer Joe R. Lansdale. In 202, Koontz became a founding member of the genre consulting firm, Blood Oath, with various other industry veterans.

In 2022, he produced five films, with the first was The Requin, starring Alicia Silverstone, followed by Revealer, for which he also wrote the comic book tie-in with Vault Comics. Old Man, starring Stephen Lang, came out in the fall, followed by Blood Relatives which premiered at Fantastic Fest, before releasing in select theaters on Thanksgiving week, and Snow Valley. Koontz directed, produced, and co-wrote Scare Package II: Rad Chad's Revenge, the sequel to Scare Package. The film premiered at Fright Fest in August, before streaming exclusively on Shudder in December, which was called a "superior and superbly silly sequel" by MovieWeb. Koontz has also expressed interest in producing a third Scare Package film with Shudder.

In 2023, he led the production of Emily Hagins's Sorry About the Demon which premiered in January on Shudder. In March, he produced The Artifice Girl, starring Lance Henriksen, which garnered him an Indie Spirit Award Nomination. The film had its U.S. Premiere at SXSW. It previously won Best International Feature at Fantasia in Montreal and Trieste in Italy. Also in 2023, he produced the Christmas creature feature A Creature Was Stirring starring Chrissy Metz and the horror thriller Trim Season starring Alex Essoe.

In 2024, he produced Shelby Oaks where Koontz launched a Kickstarter with Chris Stuckmann, which went on to break the record as the most funded horror kickstarter of all time, and then began filming in May and June in and around Ohio. In May 2024, Mike Flanagan, Trevor Macy and Melinda Nishioka were revealed to be executive producers on Shelby Oaks. Later that year, Koontz sold the film to NEON who released it in theaters globally. Koontz also created and served as the showrunner for the supernatural horror television series Revival, which premiered the following year in June 2025.

In 2026, it was announced that Koontz was producing an adaptation of Alex Kister's YouTube series The Mandela Catalogue alongside Scott Stuber and Steven Spielberg for United Artists and Amblin, to be distributed by Amazon.

== Filmography ==
=== Film ===
Year	Title	Director	Writer	Producer	Notes
2017	Camera Obscura	Yes	Yes	Yes	
2019	Scare Package	Yes	Yes	Yes	
2020	The Pale Door	Yes	Yes	Yes	Also editor
2022	Scare Package II: Rad Chad's Revenge	Yes	Yes	Yes	

Executive producer

Year	Title
2014	Starry Eyes
2020	15 Things You Didn't Know About Bigfoot
2020	The Pizzagate Masacre

Producer only

Year	Title
2022	The Requin
2022	Revealer
2022	Old Man
2022	Blood Relatives
2023	Sorry About the Demon
2023	The Artifice Girl
2023	Trim Season
2023	A Creature Was Stirring
2024	Snow Valley
2024	Shelby Oaks
2024	The Bunker

Other credits

- The Stylist (2020), production consultant

=== Television ===
Year	Title	Writer	Executive producer	Notes
2024	Tales From the Void	No	Yes	
2025	Revival	Yes	Yes	Creator and showrunner
