= The Pale Door =

2020 western horror film

- Promotional release poster
- Directed by: Aaron B. Koontz
- Written by: Cameron Burns; Aaron B. Koontz; Keith Lansdale
- Produced by: Ashleigh Snead; Matthew Thomas; Roman Dent; Aaron B. Koontz; Cameron Burns
- Starring: Devin Druid; Zachary Knighton; Melora Walters; Bill Sage; Pat Healy; Stan Shaw; Natasha Bassett; Noah Segan; Tina Parker
- Cinematography: Andrew Scott Baird
- Edited by: Greg MacLennan
- Music by: Alex Cuervo
- Production company: Paper Street Pictures
- Distributed by: RLJE Films; Shudder
- Release date: August 21, 2020
- Running time: 96 minutes
- Country: United States
- Language: English
- Box office: $21,166

The Pale Door is a 2020 American horror Western film directed by Aaron B. Koontz and written by Cameron Burns, Keith Lansdale, and Koontz, with Joe R. Lansdale as executive producer. It stars Devin Druid, Zachary Knighton, Melora Walters, Bill Sage, Pat Healy, Stan Shaw, Natasha Bassett, Noah Segan, and Tina Parker.

== Plot ==
In the middle of the night, a family home is raided by a gang of armed robbers. Brothers Jake and Duncan flee to call for help, finding Lester. Upon returning to their house, they are devastated to find it burning and their parents shot dead.

Years later, the Dalton gang meets up with Jake, who is working in a saloon. After losing one of their members in a gun fight, the gang lacks manpower for their upcoming train heist. Ignoring his older brother Duncan's objections, Jake volunteers and the gang uses him as a substitute. Duncan reluctantly joins as well.

The gang pulls off the train heist, but the chest they steal contains, instead of gold, a young woman named Pearl who claims she was taken from her home in Potemkin. She also claims there would be a handsome reward for the gang if they return her home. Duncan is wounded by a Pinkerton's bullet.

The gang travel to Potemkin with Pearl and arrive at the town brothel to get help for Duncan, who is slowly dying. Maria, the brothel's leader, welcomes the group. They drink and partake in the pleasures of the town-women. Maria sits Jake down and reveals her past, where she was burned at the stake as a witch while pregnant with Pearl.

The women transform into their true selves, hideous burnt witches and attack the gang, some of which are killed off. The remaining survivors fall back to a cabin to strategize an escape. Maria gathers her fellow witches and reveals that Jake is the one who can sustain them for many more years, as he's "innocent blood", having never taken a life and is a virgin. Jake and Dodd go back to the brothel to find Duncan, but he's not there. They rendezvous with the rest of the group and fight their way to a church.

In a hallucinatory state, Wylie eats some broken glass. Lester reveals to Jake that the reason his family was killed was because they were thieves, and they stole the farm they lived on. Later, Jake goes outside and finds Duncan apparently healed. But Dodd shoots him and he morphs into a flock of crows. Lester starts convulsing and vomiting a black liquid, and a black crow crawls out of his mouth, killing him. Wylie is found having cut himself all over with broken glass and is cutting out his eyes. He then slashes his own throat and dies. Dodd and Jake leave the church to escape but are ambushed and fall back to the town. Dodd takes on the witches and is killed while Jake moves forward. He comes upon Maria and Pearl, who offer Duncan's life in exchange for Jake. He takes the deal and Duncan rides off, eventually buying back his family's old farm and having a child of his own, named Jacob. A black crow sits ominously on their balcony as the sun sets.

== Cast ==
- Devin Druid as Jake
- Zachary Knighton as Duncan
- Melora Walters as Maria
- Bill Sage as Dodd
- Pat Healy as Wylie
- Stan Shaw as Lester
- Natasha Bassett as Pearl
- Noah Segan as Truman
- Tina Parker as Brenda

== Production ==
The Pale Door was directed by Aaron B. Koontz, who also co-wrote, and produced the film. It marks Koontz's third feature film effort, the first being the 2017 horror film Camera Obscura, the second being Scare Package. In May 2019, it was reported that production was underway in Oklahoma. Koontz has stated "I love the idea of mixing these two disparate worlds of horror and western, and to do so with the help of Keith and Joe R. Lansdale, feels like the perfect devil's playground. It is 3:10 To Yuma meets The Descent, but doused, and then set on fire with psychological horror. Once this gets going, it's relentless."

Local casting was handled by Freihofer Casting out of Norman, Oklahoma.

== Release ==
The Pale Door was released in theaters, VOD and digital HD on August 21, 2020.

=== Critical response ===
On Rotten Tomatoes, the film has an approval rating of 49%, based on 41 reviews, and an average rating of 5.3/10. Its consensus reads, "Beyond The Pale Door lies an intriguing western/horror hybrid – albeit one that struggles to fashion its halves into a compelling whole." On Metacritic, the film has a weighted average score of 39 out of 100, based on reviews from 4 critics, indicating "generally unfavorable reviews".

Tomris Laffly from Roger Ebert.com gave the film one star out of four, criticizing the film for its performances, "design elements", and lack of original ideas. Frank Scheck of The Hollywood Reporter felt that film was too chaotic due to its poor staging and editing, as well as its unconvincing characters, and pacing. Scheck concluded his review by stating, "The Pale Door represents yet another stylistic mash-up that ends up less than the sum of its parts". Cinemalogue.com Todd Jorgenson felt that the film's admittedly intriguing concept was undermined by poor execution and blending of western and horror genre cliches. Jonathan Christian of The Playlist gave the film score C−, calling it "disorganized", and criticized the use of genre cliches, pacing, "unfocused" plot, and soundtrack. Christian, however did commend the film for its retroactive style, and attention to period detail.

Becca James of The Chicago Reader called it "a raucous ride through a different type of wild west", commending the film's plot, and mixture of horror and western genre elements. The Austin Chronicle's Matthew Managle gave the film three out of five stars, commending the performances, particularly Walters', and horror/western elements. Managle did criticize the film for its soundtrack, and budgetary limitations. Grant Hermanns from ComingSoon.net noted that, while the film's first half was sluggishly paced, the film's cinematography, direction, and performances from the rest of its cast more than made up for its shortcomings. Michelle Swope of Dread Central rated the film four out of five stars, commending the cast, direction, and use of practical effects. Swope concluded her review by calling it "a wildly entertaining combination of great practical effects and an outstanding cast that is sure to please any horror fan."
