= Insidious: The Last Key (soundtrack) =

Insidious: The Last Key (Original Motion Picture Soundtrack)

Film score by Joseph Bishara
- Released: July 7, 2023
- Recorded: 2017
- Genre: Film score
- Length: 41:58
- Label: Madison Gate Records
- Producer: Joseph Bishara

Joseph Bishara chronology
The Conjuring 2 (2016)	Insidious: The Last Key (2018)	Dead Night (2018)

Insidious: The Last Key (Original Motion Picture Soundtrack) is the film score to the 2018 film Insidious: The Last Key directed by Adam Robitel and written by Leigh Whannell. It is the fourth installment in the Insidious franchise. The film is scored by recurring franchise composer Joseph Bishara.

The film score was not released initially, until it was distributed by Madison Gate Records which released it on July 7, 2023, along with Bishara's score for The Red Door (2023).

== Development ==
Joseph Bishara, who composed for the previous instalments had returned to score The Last Key. Bishara said that the story itself contributed more than the timeline which was looking into the characters and themes, regarding wounded past, personal demons, and real life traumatic events and the layers that create, sustain and perpetuate these patterns form the genesis of the score. Bishara added that an earlier inspiration came from the rural setting, which was far different from the cities, where the previous films takes place. Bishara recalled that Whannell told the story of The Last Key very earlier in the process, and the rural setting served as the standout that defined the world of this film.

== Release ==
The score was never released on its original date, with few of its cues were released as a part of More Music from the Further, which combined music from the first three Insidious and the first two Conjuring films. The original score was released on July 7, 2023, five years after the film's release. The album was distributed by Madison Gate Records, which released along with The Red Door.

== Reception ==
Alvaro Zinos-Amaro of Hex Publishers called it a "droning, melancholy score by Joseph Bishara, whose work here seems far more restrained and melodically inclined than in previous outings". Tim Grierson of Screen International and Andrew Barker of Variety called the score "eerie" and "chilling", while a critic based at The Hollywood Reporter called the score "mysterious". Staci Layne Wilson of Dread Central wrote "As ever, composer Joseph Bishara’s score evokes chills." Critc based at The Victoria Advocate called it a "familiar score".

== Track listing ==
No.	Title	Length
1.	"The Last Key"	2:12
2.	"Understand Your Gift"	1:20
3.	"They're All Around"	1:40
4.	"Key Fingers"	2:57
5.	"Book Of Seeing"	1:13
6.	"Unlocked Travels"	1:18
7.	"Jagged Vision"	1:25
8.	"Safe Now"	0:59
9.	"Help Her"	1:07
10.	"Choose It Not To"	2:16
11.	"Not A Ghost"	3:37
12.	"Keyface Locks"	2:24
13.	"Controlling Motive"	3:07
14.	"Locks Opened"	2:01
15.	"Where The Spirits Go"	2:57
16.	"Further Prison Screams"	4:11
17.	"The Facing Keys"	2:20
18.	"Wordless Circle"	3:14
19.	"It's What I Do"	1:08
Total length:		41:26

== Accolades ==
Award	Date of ceremony	Category	Recipient(s)	Result	Ref(s)
Hollywood Music in Media Awards	November 14, 2018	Best Original Score – Horror/Thriller Film	Joseph Bishara	Nominated	
International Film Music Critics Association	February 7, 2019	Best Original Score for a Fantasy/Science Fiction/Horror Film	Joseph Bishara	Nominated	
