= Dead Night =

2017 film directed by Bradford Baruh

- Poster
- Directed by: Bradford Baruh
- Screenplay by: Irving Walker
- Story by: Irving Walker; Bradford Baruh
- Produced by: Andy Meyers; Bradford Baruh
- Starring: Brea Grant; A.J. Bowen; Sophie Dalah; Elise Luthman; Joshua Hoffman; Daniel Roebuck; Barbara Crampton
- Cinematography: Kenton Drew Johnson
- Edited by: Meghan Leon
- Music by: Joseph Bishara
- Production company: M3 Alliance Limited
- Distributed by: Dark Sky Films
- Release dates: September 22, 2017 (Fantastic Fest); July 27, 2018 (United States)
- Country: United States
- Language: English

Dead Night is a 2017 horror film directed by Bradford Baruh, in his directorial debut, working from a screenplay written by Irving Walker, based on a story by Walker and Baruh. It stars Brea Grant, A.J. Bowen and Barbara Crampton. The film premiered at Fantastic Fest on September 22, 2017 before receiving a release date of July 27, 2018 in the United States from Dark Sky Films.

== Premise ==
Follows a dual storyline of two differing perspectives about a murdered family in the woods.

== Cast ==
- Brea Grant as Casey Pollack
- A.J. Bowen as James Pollack
- Barbara Crampton as Leslie Bison
- Sophie Dalah as Jessica Pollack
- Elise Luthman as Becky Lane
- Joshua Hoffman as Jason Pollack
- Daniel Roebuck as Jack Sterling
- Joy Osmanski as Mika Shand
- Kay D'Arcy as Lily Lane
- Sky Soleil as Detective Walker
- Dianna Miranda as Dr. Cynthia Ramsey
- Alison Haislip as Jenni Whitmore
- Ryan Schwartzman as Karl Durant
- Shauan Case as Amanda Tate
- Joshua Hinson as Emmanuel "Manny" Rothwell
- Keana Marie as Kate Rothwell
- Gina Comparetto as 1960's Girl
- Chase Williamson as 1960's Guy

== Production ==
In the original iteration of the script by Irving Walker and Bradford Baruh, the film was broken in two parts; one half was a "true crime" television show, depicting the events of the family's murder, and then the "*real* events". Baruh claimed this approached worked great on the page, but would not translate well on the screen. In April 2016, the film was announced under the title Applecart. Baruh, a producer on John Dies at the End, was slated to make his directorial debut with Don Coscarelli serving as an executive producer, and Brea Grant, A.J. Bowen, Barbara Crampton, Sophie Dalah, Elise Luthman, and Joshua Hoffman set to star. Crampton was pitched the film by Coscarelli at the American Film Market while trying to generate interest for her film Beyond the Gates.

Production began on location in Lake Tahoe and Los Angeles, California by April 2016, as well as in Baruh's childhood home in Hillsborough, California.

Following criticisms at its debut at Fantastic Fest in September 2017, the filmmakers re-edited the film and retitled the film to Dead Night by February 2018.

== Release ==
The film, then known as Applecart, premiered at Fantastic Fest on September 22, 2017. After a retooling, now Dead Night, the film was purchased by Dark Sky Films at the European Film Market. The new cut of the film was first shown at Cinepocalypse.

=== Home media ===
Dead Night was released on DVD on September 11, 2018.

== Reception ==
On review aggregator Rotten Tomatoes, Dead Night holds an approval rating of 63% based on 16 reviews, with an average rating of 5.60/10.

=== Initial Fantastic Fest reviews ===
For Birth.Movies.Death, Jacob Knight criticized the "faux true crime show" segments with Daniel Roebuck, regarding them as "hokey" and tonally confusing. Kalyn Corrigan of Bloody Disgusting wrote "it barely even manages to serve as a fun slasher". Trey Hilburn III of iHorror praised the film's meta aspects, acknowledging it as "a bit jarring" but it "ultimately allows the film to find its own fun and self-aware footing".

=== Re-edit reviews ===
For HeyUGuys, Ben Robins called the film " a full-on adrenaline shot of pure madness that makes little-to-no sense at all". Cheryl Eddy, writing for Gizmodo, highlighted Crampton's performance and said "though the mystical elements of Dead Night are rather vaguely explained, some delightfully gross creature effects do most of the talking on that front".

Abbey Bender, of Village Voice, wrote "Dead Night ends up being muddled, never committing to either solemn supernatural horror or its elements of camp." RogerEbert.com's Peter Sobczynski said "It has a couple of interesting ideas, a certain degree of style and one impressive performance but never manages to pull them together into a cohesive or satisfying whole."
