= Natasha Kermani =

Iranian-American screenwriter and director

- Occupations: Film director; screenwriter
- Years active: 2011–present
- Website: illiumpictures.com

Nathasha Kermani is an Iranian-American screenwriter and film director. She has directed Imitation Girl (2017) and Lucky (2020). She graduated from the New York University Tisch School of the Arts.

== Career ==
Brea Grant originally pitched to direct her own script, Lucky (2020), to Epic Pictures, who recommended Kermani direct instead. Described as a "feminist thriller", the film finished shooting in Los Angeles in July 2019. Lucky (2020) held its International Premiere at Fantasia and screened at FrightFest.

She contributed a segment to V/H/S/85, which debuted October 6, 2023 and became Shudder and AMC+'s most-watched exclusive film premiere, increasing viewership 25% from V/H/S/99. Kermani described it as an opportunity to embrace something, "mean and ugly."

Her film, Abraham's Boys, was acquired by RLJE and Shudder in April 2025 ahead of its premiere at the Overlook Film Festival.

== Filmography ==
- Shattered (2017)
- Imitation Girl (2017)
- Lucky (2020)
- V/H/S/85 (segment "TKNOGD") (2023)
- Abraham's Boys (2025)
- The Dreadful (2026)
