= Scare Package =

2019 American horror film

- Directed by: Aaron B. Koontz ("Rad Chad's Horror Emporium, Horror Hypothesis"); Courtney Andujar ("Girls' Night Out Of Body"); Hillary Andujar ("Girls' Night Out Of Body"); Anthony Cousins ("The Night He Came Back Again! Part IV: The Final Kill"); Emily Hagins ("Cold Open"); Chris McInroy ("One Time In The Woods"); Noah Segan ("M.I.S.T.E.R."); Baron Vaughn ("So Much To Do")
- Screenplay by: Aaron B. Koontz ("Rad Chad's Horror Emporium, Horror Hypothesis"); Cameron Burns ("Rad Chad's Horror Emporium, Horror Hypothesis"); Hillary Andujar ("Girls' Night Out Of Body"); Courtney Andujar ("Girls' Night Out Of Body"); Ben Fee ("Girls' Night Out Of Body"); Anthony Cousins ("The Night He Came Back Again! Part IV: The Final Kill"); Noah Segan ("M.I.S.T.E.R."); Frank Garcia-Hejl ("M.I.S.T.E.R."); Emily Hagins ("Cold Open"); Chris McInroy ("One Time In The Woods"); Baron Vaughn ("So Much To Do")
- Produced by: Aaron B. Koontz; Cameron Burns; Alex Euting; Kris Phipps; Shawn Talley; Ashleigh Snead
- Cinematography: Andrew Scott Baird ("Rad Chad's Horror Emporium, Horror Hypothesis"); Anthony Cousins ("The Night He Came Back Again! Part IV: The Final Kill"); E.J. Enriquez ("One Time In The Woods"); Kalilah Robinson ("M.I.S.T.E.R."); Spencer Rollins ("So Much To Do"); Dustin Supencheck ("Cold Open"); Sonja Tsypin ("Girls' Night Out Of Body")
- Edited by: Winnie Cheung ("Girls' Night Out Of Body"); Alex Euting ("Rad Chad's Horror Emporium, Horror Hypothesis"); Paul Gandersman ("Cold Open"); Richard Louprasong ("The Night He Came Back Again! Part IV: The Final Kill"); Tyler Mager ("Cold Open"); Chris McInroy ("One Time In The Woods"); Mike Small ("M.I.S.T.E.R."); Rhiannon C. Vaughn ("So Much To Do")
- Production company: Paper Street Pictures
- Distributed by: Shudder
- Release dates: October 4, 2019 (Sitges); June 18, 2020 (United States)
- Running time: 107 minutes
- Country: United States
- Language: English

Scare Package is a 2019 American anthology horror comedy film created by Aaron B. Koontz and Cameron Burns. It features a series of horror shorts written and directed by Aaron B. Koontz, Courtney Andujar, Hillary Andujar, Anthony Cousins, Emily Hagins, Chris McInroy, Noah Segan, and Baron Vaughn.

The film debuted at the Sitges Film Festival in October 2019, and was released exclusively on Shudder on June 18, 2020.

A sequel to the film was announced in late 2021. Scare Package II: Rad Chad's Revenge was released on Shudder December 2022.

== Plot ==
The film is presented as an anthology of short horror films, built into a frame narrative which acts as its own horror film. The frame narrative focuses on Chad Buckley, a horror aficionado who runs a struggling video store. He takes on a new hire, much to the chagrin of an obnoxious regular customer named Sam who has been trying to persuade Chad to hire him for years. The shorts are films that are either described to other characters or viewed as one of the video rentals offered at the store.

=== "Rad Chad's Horror Emporium, Horror Hypothesis"/Frame narrative/"Horror Hypothesis" ===
The film opens with the short "Cold Open", after which Mike (one of the people featured in the short) is shown describing the short as a horror movie pitch to Chad, who picked him up as a hitchhiker. After dropping off Mike, Chad opens his video store, Rad Chad's Horror Emporium, and rejects Sam's latest attempt at employment. Another person, Hawn, applies for the same position and is instantly hired. Sam arrives at the checkout counter with a videotape he wants to rent and describes the opening of the movie, which begin the next segment, "One Time In The Woods". As the day progresses Chad trains Hawn and a series of events prompts the launch of the other shorts, which make up a large portion of the film.

Chad is ultimately betrayed by Hawn, who was actually part of a scientific group running experiments on a serial killer known as the "Devil's Lake Impaler" under the video store. Imprisoned with several others, Chad identifies the others as horror character stereotypes, the jock, the stoner, the slut, the token black guy and the final girl, Chad realizes he's the know-it-all-horror-guy and they're all in an actual horror movie. When the Impaler inevitably overcomes his captors, Chad chooses to flee with the person he identifies as the final girl and the stoner. While escaping Chad learns that cars cannot start if the killer is within 14 meters of the car and that the Impaler became a serial killer after a group of frat boys killed his friend Jimmy. The remaining group members reunite, at which point Chad realizes that he had misidentified the slut and final girl. Their escape is halted when they discover that security protocol prevents the elevator from allowing them to reach the exit, however they are assisted by the sudden appearance of Joe Bob Briggs, who dies in the process. Chad is then killed by the Impaler, who follows the true final girl and the stoner to the surface.

The stoner tricks the Impaler into believing him to be Jimmy and the final girl manages to incapacitate him, however the stoner dies after trying to move the body away so that they can start the getaway car. The final girl flees to a field, where she wakens from a nightmare to discover that the Impaler is in the car with her. She dodges his assault and runs out of the car, where Mike from the Cold Open intercepts her and tosses a cigarette causing the car to explode and presumably kill the Impaler.

=== "Cold Open" ===
Mike Myers is a stock, horror movie background character tasked with facilitating the horrible circumstances other unsuspecting horror characters find themselves in. He fiddles with a loose road sign arrow indicating the location of an insane asylum. The arrow spins in the wrong direction, causing a group of unsuspecting young people on their way to a camp, to instead drive to the insane asylum.

Mike vents about his job to his friend Wendy, and in a series of flashbacks, Mike is at work planting satanic relics in an attic, fooling a house buying couple into buying a haunted house, and setting up a cursed doll. Mike expresses a desire to be an actual character and not just a cold open.

Mike cuts the power to a house where two women are babysitting on Halloween. Instead of leaving like he's supposed to, he sticks around. The women realize he's the one who cut the power so come up with a plan and invite him in. Hannah attacks Mike with his wire cutters, but slips and falls on some candy Mike dropped, impaling herself in the neck. Tess sneaks up behind Mike as he tries removing the cutters from Hannah's neck, and he accidentally stabs Tess with them. Mike puts on a white mask to keep from being sprayed in the face with blood from Tess' wound, then picks up her bloody knife. Wendy shows up as a cop and shoots Mike in the shoulder, believing he is a masked killer.

=== "One Time In The Woods" ===
Trip, Mark, Dawn and Brenda are camping in the woods. Mark steps in some mysterious green goo that he thinks is bug guts. A crazed man shows up warning them to leave and that he is going to kill them. The man falls, starts convulsing and expelling green and orange goo. Dawn and Brenda beat him with sticks, and the man instructs them to use silver as his skin begins to rip from his body, spraying blood all over Dawn and Brenda. Trip puts silver handcuffs on the man as he deforms into a pile of goo, blood and guts, the silver having paused the transformation. Trip puts on a mask, and the goo-man identifies him as the "Back Woods Slasher". Mark tries throwing an axe at him but misses and instead hits a passing biker in the genitals. Trip bear hugs Mark, causing his guts to spill out, killing him. Dawn and Brenda run into the woods. Brenda accidentally impales herself in the mouth on a tree branch. Trip throws a large rock at her head, exploding it. Dawn runs further into the woods. A man approaches her and asks where the goo-man is. Trip pulls the man's legs off and beats him with them. Trip chases Dawn back to the camp site and slips in some green goo, falling and impaling his face on the back of the axe stuck in the biker's genitals. Goo-man bites Dawn and she transforms into a pile of green goo too.

=== "M.I.S.T.E.R." ===
A Husband sits alone at a bar, chatting with the Bartender, who creeps the husband out. The Husband goes to the bathroom and notices a flyer advertising an organization called M.I.S.T.E.R., which stands for Men In Serious Turmoil Establishing Rights. As The Husband ponders the flyer, we flashback to an argument between him and his wife where she complains about his lack of effort with the family and wants him to be a man.

The Husband goes to a M.I.S.T.E.R. meeting where the group's leader is giving a pep talk to the men in attendance. In a montage, we cut back and forth between the members complaining about their neutered lives. After the meeting the leader talks with the Husband, encouraging him to join the group and invites him to a get-together happening that night.

The Husband goes home and is about to put something in a duffel bag, but we don't see what. He arrives at the get-together that takes place on a football field. The leader snaps his fingers and the lights to the stadium go out. The group transforms into werewolves. The Husband kills each werewolf one by one using different weapons.

The Husband comes home to a party his wife has put on. He shows her some werewolf fur he's skinned from one of the wolves. Everyone dons black robes and commence a ceremony with a pentagram in the middle of the floor.

=== "Girls Night Out Of Body" ===
Ray browses the aisle of a convenience store. She's being stalked by an unseen person who breathes heavily. She notices a lollipop in the shape of a human skull that says "Not For Sale". She steals the lollipop and leaves the store with Ali. The Store Clerk eyes them suspiciously. Ray and Ali get in the car with their friend Jamie, who drives. The stalker from the store watches them from inside another car. The stalker follows them as they drive to a hotel.

The stalker watches them through the window of the room as they start drinking and listening to music. Ray reveals the lollipop she stole. Ali and Ray lick the lollipop. From the stalker's POV we see Jamie look toward the window and close the curtains. Ali feels strange and goes to lay down, putting a towel over her face. After a while, Jamie checks on her and startles her awake, the towel falling to the floor. Ray and Jamie are stunned, as Ali's face has transformed into the same skull like form as the lollipop. Ray's face also transforms into the skull shape. Thinking she can fix the problem, Jamie calls the convenience store, asking for help. The Store Clerk emits an evil, monstrous laugh. Jamie reaches for the lollipop skull and puts it over her face as the stalker reaches for the door handle. Jamie licks the lollipop. She pulls the stalker into the room and they kill him. They dance and have a pillow fight.

=== "The Night He Came Back Again! Part IV: The Final Kill" ===
Daisy (Chelsey Grant) and Greg are in bed kissing. Someone watches them from the ajar closet. Suddenly the window is smashed and a Masked Killer climbs through the window. Before the killer can stab Daisy, a group of her friends spring from the closet and subdue the killer with stun batons. We dissolve to the garage, where the killer wakes up, tied to a table, surrounded by Daisy and her friends. Daisy expresses her anger at the killer for killing her friends and boyfriends every year. Someone hands her a knife and she stabs the killer in the chest. The killer wakes up and she stabs him over and over again. Greg tries to demonstrate that the killer is dead, but the killer stabs him in the back of the head with the knife. Next they attach jumper cables to the killer's body and shock him with a car battery. Seth checks his vitals with a stethoscope, but a bolt of electricity from the killer's heart travels up the stethoscope and explodes Seth's head. Next they stuff firecrackers down the killer's mouth. The firecrackers go off, cutting the killer in half. Chloe picks up the killer's lower half, and his legs come to life, wrapping themselves around her, choking her. Will tosses the killer's intestines over the ceiling beam and pulls, causing the legs to lift Chloe into the air, killing her. Will professes his love to Daisy, but the killer watches, taunting them. Daisy grabs a shotgun and tells Will to unmask the killer. Will takes off the killer's mask, revealing an attractive man. Daisy hesitates in shooting him. The killer grabs Will by the throat, choking him. Daisy can't bring herself to shoot him, and Will dies. Daisy finally pulls the trigger, blowing a hole in the killer's head. She calls and rents a wood chipper. She shoves the killer's body into the wood chipper as he reveals that he's her brother. She tries to stop but it's too late. She watches a 4 July fireworks display. The killer's reformed hand comes out of the pool of blood.

=== "So Much To Do" ===
An unseen person drives wearing black leather gloves. A man is tied with rope and locked in the trunk of the car. The car parks and two mysterious men in all black drag the tied man to a grave site. The tied man wakes up and pleads that he has so much to do. One of the mysterious men removes a glove, revealing a mysterious symbol glowing with light. He burns the symbol into the tied man's forehead and kicks him into the grave. They bury him alive.

Later, smoke emerges from the grave and travels across the ground. Franchesca sits alone in her car, parked in a nearby empty field. She is on the phone with a friend, warning her not to spoil a TV show they're discussing. She hasn't caught up and the finale is tonight. The smoke approaches and engulfs the car. Franchesca gets out to investigate. She gets back in her car and the phone signal breaks up. Franchesca is startled by the marked man who is standing in front of her car. The man vaporizes into smoke and her windows break. She breathes in the smoke and the windows reform and fix themselves. Franchesca says she has so much to do, the same line the marked man spoke before being buried. She looks in the rearview mirror and we see the marked man.

The marked man comes home and sits down to watch TV. It is the finale of the show Franchesca didn't want spoiled. Franchesca calls out to him and he goes to the mirror, revealing her standing next to him, claiming he has her body. They get into a physical confrontation, and fight over the remote. She hits him so hard he vaporizes and she has her body back. All beaten up, she goes to her car and checks her phone. A text from a friend spoils the end of the show. She drives off and the two mysterious men from earlier follow her.

== Cast ==
=== "Cold Open" ===
- Luxy Banner as Hannah
- Sydney Huddleston as Tess
- Haley Alea Erickson as Wendy
- Jon Michael Simpson as Mike Myers
- Chris Bowlsby as House Buying Husband
- Christine Hall as House Buying Wife
- Cassandra Hierholzer as Ghost

=== "Rad Chad's Horror Emporium" ===
- Jeremy King as Chad
- Hawn Tran as Hawn
- Byron Brown as Sam
- Jon Michael Simpson as Mike Myers
- Dana Magaha as Customer
- Logan Magaha as Customer's Son

=== "One Time In The Woods" ===
- Jessie Tilton as Brenda
- Kirk Johnson as Tommy
- Carlos Larotta as Mark
- Stephanie Thoreson as Dawn
- Mac Blake as Hank
- Will Elliot as Trip
- Jon Copp as Biker

=== "M.I.S.T.E.R." ===
- Noah Segan as Husband
- Frank Garcia-Hejl as Frank
- Jonathan Fernandez as Bartender
- Jocelyn Deboer as Wife
- Allan Mcleod as MISTER member
- Don Fanelli as MISTER member
- Jon Gabrus as MISTER member
- Kale Hills as MISTER member
- Luis Jose Lopez as Partygoer
- Peter S. Kim as Partygoer
- Stacy Ines as Partygoer
- Eric Lewis Baker as Partygoer
- Leo Zapata as Partygoer
- June Mccool Segan as The Baby

=== "Girls Night Out Of Body" ===
- Gabrielle Maiden as Jamie
- Melanie Minichino as Ali
- Atsuko Okatsuka as Ray
- Clarita Cabandong as Store Clerk
- Ben Fee as Cableknit Stalker
- Manuel Taylor-Alcocer as Radio Announcer
- Emily Andujar as Evil Laugh

=== "The Night He Came Back Again! Part IV: The Final Kill" ===
- Chelsey Grant as Daisy
- Jack Hartwig as Will
- Julie McCarthy as Chloe
- Jameson Pieper as Seth
- Nicolas Sulivan as Greg
- Tommy David as The Killer

=== "So Much To Do" ===
- Toni Trucks as Franchesca
- Aaron D. Alexander as Marked Man
- Candice Thompson as Maggie
- Jules Gonzalez as man In Black
- Billy Hedgecock as man In Black
- Travis Michael Keller as man In Black
- Baron Vaughn as Jay Battle
- Baron Vaughn as Ray "DATWIN" Battle
- Baron Vaughn as Bruce Leroi Jones

=== "Horror Hypothesis" ===
- Jeremy King as Chad
- Zoe Graham as Jessie
- Chase Williamson as Pete
- Josephine McAdam as Kelly
- Justin Maina as Brandon
- Dustin Rhodes as Devil's Lake Impaler
- Gregory Kelly as Devil's Lake Impaler (Additional Scenes)
- Joe Bob Briggs as himself
- Kelsey Pribilski as Christine
- Andre Williams as Craig
- Brian Villalobos as Tony
- Spencer Greenwood as Gary
- Avery Moore as Dixie The Intern
- Hawn Tran as Hawn
- Peggy Scott as Mary Ellen (Scientist)
- Les Best as Earl Birch (Scientist)
- Byron Brown as Sam
- Tristan Riggs as Jimmy The Cancer Boy
- Holt Boggs as Officer Polderneck
- Jon Michael Simpson as Mike Myers
- Mitchell Rad as Impaled Security Guard
- Sam Stinson as Impaled Security Guard
- Lawrence Varnado as Impaled Security Guard
- Don Daro as Hawn Security Guard
- Christopher Wimbush as Hawn Security Guard
- Fontessa Booker as Scientist
- Jesse Ferraro as Scientist
- Marzipan as Cat

== Genesis ==
In an interview with Entertainment Weekly, writer/director/producer Aaron B. Koontz revealed his approach to creating a horror anthology. "I'm a big fan of anthology films but knew we had to change the game up a bit," said Koontz in a statement. "So we gathered this hungry group of diverse, super-talented horror enthusiasts and asked them to subvert these well-known horror tropes while also paying homage to them. In the end, it made for a unique experience that I cannot wait for audiences to discover."

== Release ==
The film was released exclusively on Shudder on June 18, 2020.

== Reception ==
On the review aggregator website Rotten Tomatoes, 81% of 43 critics' reviews are positive, with an average rating of 7.2/10. The website's consensus reads: "Some of its contents are more entertaining than others, but genre fans should still find this Scare Package well worth opening."

Rafael Motomayor of Slashfilm gave the film a score of 8/10, writing, "Scare Package is destined to become a midnight crowd favorite, a consistently funny love letter to the genre, made by people who love horror for people to love horror." Richard Whittaker of The Austin Chronicle gave it 3/5 stars, calling it "deliciously ghoulish and inspiringly idiotic". Bloody Disgusting's Meredith Borders gave it a score of 4/5, saying it was "charmingly aware of the tropes that make up the genre it cherishes, and it leans into them with heart, blood, entrails and laughs. You'll have a good time with Scare Package – and you should hit up the bathroom beforehand, because you won't find any weak links here."

Simon Abrams of RogerEbert.com gave it 0/4 stars, writing, "Your mileage may vary when it comes to this sort of pandering humor, but that doesn't make Scare Package more clever or less janky. Most segments are so short that their creators barely establish and then mildly frustrate a basic set of expectations." Rue Morgue's Michael Gingold wrote, "Perhaps it's unfair to base one's judgement of a movie so closely against its predecessors, but when its primary goal is to demonstrate that it's smarter than the genre's run-of-the-mill, comparison with others of its type is unavoidable–and, in this case, unflattering."

== Sequels ==
Koontz directed, produced and co-wrote Scare Package 2: Rad Chad's Revenge, the sequel to Scare Package. The film premiered at Fright Fest in August, before streaming exclusively on Shudder in December, which was called a "superior and superbly silly sequel" by MovieWeb.

Koontz has said that he hoped to make a third Scare Package film with Shudder.
