= Sparks (2013 film) =

2013 film by Chris Folino

- Directed by: Christopher Folino; Todd Burrows
- Written by: Christopher Folino
- Based on: Sparks by Christopher Folino
- Produced by: Christopher Folino; Todd Burrows; James Sutton; Tyler Endicott; Mike Smith
- Starring: Ashley Bell; Chase Williamson; William Katt; Clancy Brown; Clint Howard; Jake Busey
- Cinematography: Jackson Myers; Josh Fritts
- Edited by: Max Carlson
- Music by: Jacob Shea
- Production company: Sideshow Productions
- Release date: March 1, 2013 (Cinequest Film Festival)
- Running time: 90 minutes
- Country: United States
- Language: English

Sparks is a 2013 American independent action thriller film directed and produced by Christopher Folino and Todd Burrows from a screenplay by Folino. The film is based on the graphic novel of the same name by Folino. The film was in production in January 2013 and was released in March 2014 in the United States.

The film stars Chase Williamson as the Sparks, Ashley Bell as the Lady Heavenly, Clancy Brown, Jake Busey, William Katt, Marina Squerciati and Clint Howard among others.

== Plot ==
Ian Sparks (Chase Williamson) discovers the dark side of heroism, while going after the nation's most notorious super-criminal he manages to leave his life and reputation in ruins along the way. The tragic loss of his parents as a young boy leaves him scarred in unimaginable ways, but it helps shape his desire to become a "super". He manages to team up with fellow “super” Lady Heavenly (Ashley Bell), but the arrival of a vicious serial killer, Matanza (William Katt), who unleashes a bloody rampage on the city, destroys Sparks and Heavenly’s partnership and relationship.

Racked with guilt, Sparks hits rock bottom, only to be saved by a guardian angel Archer (Clancy Brown), a cop whose own tragedy was linked to the fate of Sparks’ parents. Archer and Sparks discover their common enemy, which brings together a partnership of other “gifted” individuals whose intentions are not as honorable as Sparks. Hitting rock bottom again, Sparks looks to make an easy buck, but finds danger along the way. In order to right the wrong done to his life and to his friends, he must face his past and fight for his future. Now all Ian Sparks can do is regain his dignity, seek redemption, and clear his name.

== Cast ==
- Chase Williamson as Ian Sparks
- Ashley Bell as Lady Heavenly
- Clancy Brown as Archer
- Jake Busey as Sledge
- William Katt as Matanza
- Marina Squerciati as Dawn
- Clint Howard as Gordon Eldridge

== Production ==
In 2008, William Katt and Christopher Folino came up with idea of Sparks the comic book after working on Mythology Wars, a different comic book. This comic came from scratch with all new ideas from both Katt and Folino. After finishing the writing for the comic, they found Tyler Endicott and JM Ringuet to complete the project with the pictures. In 2011, Christopher Folino along with producers Tyler Endicott and James Sutton started production for the movie that became Sparks based on the comic book.

Executive produced by Angelina Folino, Rose Folino, and William Katt with producers Todd Burrows, Brett Carleton, Max Carlson, Gregg Nolan, Manuel Silva, and Chase Williamson, the movie started production in January 2012 with two crews simultaneously at different locations in a two-week period. Burrows, the director of the movie, tells Filmoria that “ It was a difficult dance, especially when you deal with shooting out of context and out of story order.” However, Folino states that with Bell and Williamson, the film’s lead, and his 80-90 person crew, it was completely possible.

== Release ==
In August 2013, Archstone Distribution announced that they had acquired the rights to the film for international release, while Image Entertainment distributed the movie within the United States and Canada. The film premiered at Cinequest March 1, 2013 to wider audiences. It was released on DVD on March 18, 2014.
