= Camera Obscura (2017 film) =

2017 film by Aaron B. Koontz

- Official release poster
- Directed by: Aaron B. Koontz
- Written by: Aaron B. Koontz; Cameron Burns
- Produced by: Andrew Van Den Houten; Aaron B. Koontz; Amir Zbeda
- Starring: Christopher Denham; Nadja Bobyleva; Noah Segan; Catherine Curtin; Chase Williamson; Andrew Senseng; Gretchen Lodge
- Cinematography: Chris Heinrich
- Edited by: Zach Passero
- Music by: Steve Moore
- Production companies: Chiller Films; Hood River Entertainment; Paper Street Pictures
- Distributed by: Chiller Network
- Release dates: April 22, 2017 (Florida Film Festival); June 9, 2017 (United States)
- Running time: 95 minutes
- Country: United States
- Language: English

Camera Obscura is a 2017 horror film directed by Aaron B. Koontz in his feature film directorial debut, with a script written by Koontz and his writing partner Cameron Burns. It stars Christopher Denham, Nadja Bobyleva, Noah Segan, Catherine Curtin, Chase Williamson, and Andrew Sensenig.

== Premise ==
Jack, a war photographer suffering from post-traumatic stress disorder, sees imminent deaths in photographs he has taken with an old, antique camera.

== Cast ==
- Christopher Denham as Jack Zeller
- Nadja Bobyleva as Claire Zeller
- Catherine Curtin as Det. Dawson
- Chase Williamson as Det. Ford
- Noah Segan as Walt
- Andrew Sensenig as Charlie Hibbert
- Gretchen Lodge as Shannon
- Jeremy King as Tad Buckely
- Dane Rhodes as Camera Store Manager
- David Jensen as Bernard
- Charlie Talbert as Frank
- Carol Sutton as Dr. Vogel
- Lance E. Nichols as Lt. Vincent

== Production ==
Aaron B. Koontz was inspired to write Camera Obscura after one of his co-workers had visited South America and the locals did not allow him to take pictures as "it would steal their souls". Koontz also cited a true story of a man with PTSD who attacked people on a freeway. While writing the film, Koontz looked towards Final Destination for inspiration, including Jeffrey Reddick's original draft.

While producing the film Starry Eyes, Koontz met actor Noah Segan, and the two began collaborating on the film. Impressed with their performances in Lovely Molly and John Dies at the End respectively, the director met with and cast Gretchen Lodge and Chase Williamson in 2013. Barbara Crampton had signed onto the film at one point, but dropped out due to her availability changing.

Production had begun in Baton Rouge, Louisiana by April 2016.

== Release ==
Camera Obscura debuted at the Florida Film Festival on April 22, 2017. Prior to the film's premiere, Chiller Films acquired the rights to the film in April 2017. The film was released domestically on June 9, 2017 and on VOD on June 13, 2017.

=== Home media ===
The film was distributed on Blu-ray and DVD by Uncork'd Entertainment on November 9, 2017.

== Reception ==
On review aggregator Rotten Tomatoes, Camera Obscura holds an approval rating of 30% based on 20 reviews, with an average rating of 4.70/10. On Metacritic, the film holds an average rating of 35 out of 100 from 8 reviews, indicating "generally unfavorable" reviews.

Dennis Harvey of Variety said the film was "definitely a cut above in genre terms, with room for some nicely drawn character writing and acting", singling out the performance of Curtin and Segan in particular. For Dread Central, Staci Layne Wilson wrote "there are enough moments of suspense and mystery to make it worth your while."

Writing for The Hollywood Reporter, Frank Scheck wrote "despite Denham’s impressively committed performance in the central role, Camera Obscura never achieves the proper focus." Michael Nordine of IndieWire said "nothing that’s made its way onscreen will unnerve you the way Jack’s photos unnerve him." Slant Magazine's Henry Stewart said the film goes "through the genre motions in the dullest way possible."

== Future ==
In an interview with PopHorror, director Aaron B. Koontz expressed an interest in a prequel film following Andrew Senseng's character. Koontz also claimed there was a "sound" idea for a sequel, however he'd prefer to let someone else direct it, if it were to be made.

== See also ==
- Polaroid, a 2019 film with a similar premise
- Say Cheese and Die!, a 1992 Goosebumps book, which was adapted into a 1996 television episode, with a similar premise
