= Soundtrack to Our Teenage Zombie Apocalypse =

2022 Australian drama TV series

Soundtrack to Our Teenage Zombie Apocalypse is an Australian drama television series aimed at children and teenagers. Directed by Imogen McCluskey, the series premiered on ABC Me on 15 August 2022.

== Synopsis ==
Soundtrack to Our Teenage Zombie Apocalypse follows the story of four music-obsessed teens on a mission to win the Triple J Unearthed High competition who find themselves trapped in an abandoned building during a zombie apocalypse. Bandmates Ella and Nick are stuck in a zombie-infested ABC building, surviving on vending machine snacks while they try to finish the song that will take them to the big leagues. But when Ella's high school nemesis, Veronica and Nick's crippling celebrity crush, Locksley, appear out of thin air, they feel their chances of escaping and – more importantly – of winning Unearthed High start to slip away.

== Cast ==
- Mina-Siale as Ella
- Nick Annas as Nick
- Ruby Archer as Veronica
- Isaiah Galloway as Locksley

== Production ==
Director Imogen McCluskey and cinematographer Lucca Barone-Peters had previously collaborated on their debut feature film Suburban Wildlife, and this was their first TV series. In between, McCluskey has directed TikTok and Instagram series, short films, and music videos. She describes herself as "very much an actor's director".

== Release ==
Soundtrack to Our Teenage Zombie Apocalypse premiered on ABC Me on 15 August 2022. The first five episodes became available on ABC iview at the same time, with the next five being released on the streaming platform on 22 August 2022.
