= Noah Segan =

American actor

- Segan in 2026
- Occupation: Actor
- Years active: 1988–present
- Spouse: Alison Bennett (m. 2017)
- Children: 2
- Relatives: Arthur Rothstein (grandfather); Rob Stoner (uncle)

Noah Segan is an American actor and filmmaker. He is best known for his work with filmmaker Rian Johnson on Brick (2005), The Brothers Bloom (2008), Looper (2012), Star Wars: The Last Jedi (2017), and the Knives Out film series since 2019, as well as his appearance in horror films Deadgirl (2008) and Starry Eyes (2014).

== Early life ==
Segan is the grandson of American photographer Arthur Rothstein and nephew of musician Rob Stoner.

== Career ==
Segan has appeared in television programs, including Days of Our Lives, CSI: Crime Scene Investigation, and House. He provided the voice of Henry on the Nickelodeon series KaBlam!.

Segan is best known for his collaboration with director Rian Johnson, appearing in all of his projects he has directed, starting with Brick (2005). In 2008, Johnson invited Segan to play a small role in his second film, The Brothers Bloom. In 2012, Segan had a supporting lead role as Kid Blue in Johnson's third film, Looper. In 2013, he had a small role on Breaking Bad as a fireman in the Johnson-directed episode "Ozymandias". In April 2016, Johnson added Segan to the cast of Star Wars: The Last Jedi. Segan joined the cast of Johnson's Knives Out in December 2018, playing the supporting role of state trooper Wagner. He had a bit part as a squatter named Derol in the Knives Out sequel Glass Onion: A Knives Out Mystery. In the 2025 threequel Wake Up Dead Man, Segan plays the role of the Nikolai the bartender. He also appeared in two episodes of the Johnson-created series Poker Face.

Segan produced and starred in many independent feature films such as Someone's Knocking at the Door, Quit, Redeemer, and Some Kind of Hate. He has directed numerous music videos and also appeared in the music videos for "C'mon Let Me Ride" and "Final Warning", both songs by Skylar Grey. In 2014, Segan starred alongside Alex Essoe in the horror thriller film Starry Eyes. In 2015, he starred in the thriller film Follow, and played a role in the sci-fi revenge thriller The Mind's Eye. In June 2015, he appeared in the music video for "You Don't Know Me" by Son Lux, opposite Tatiana Maslany.

Segan has appeared twice on The George Lucas Talk Show, first during the May the AR Be LI$$ You (Arli$$ marathon fundraiser), and later on The George Lucas Holiday Special.

In 2022, Segan wrote, produced, directed and starred in his first feature film, Blood Relatives, financed and distributed by AMC Networks' Shudder.

In 2026, Segan premiered his second directorial feature film The Only Living Pickpocket in New York, produced by T-Street and MRC, starring John Turturro, Steve Buscemi, Tatiana Maslany, Giancarlo Esposito and Jamie Lee Curtis, at the Sundance and Berlinale. The film was released by Sony Pictures Classics in New York and Los Angeles on October 23, 2026 and expanded Nationwide on October 30, 2026. .

== Filmography ==
=== Film ===
Year	Title	Role	Notes
2005	Brick	Dode	
2005	Waterborne	Donovan	
2005	Adam & Steve	Twink	
2005	Self Medicated	Trevor	
2006	The Visitation	Michael Elliot	
2007	The Picture of Dorian Gray	Basil Hallward	
2007	What We Do Is Secret	Don Bolles	
2007	Still Green	Sean	
2008	Love at First Kill	Harry	
2008	Deadgirl	J.T.	
2008	The Brothers Bloom	The Duke	
2009	The Astral Plane	Noah	Short film; also writer
2009	The Hessen Affair	Lt. David Pallard	
2009	Fanboys	Boba Fett #2	
2009	Someone's Knocking at the Door	Justin	Also producer
2009	Cabin Fever 2: Spring Fever	John	
2010	Quit	Julius	Also co-producer
2010	All About Evil	Adrian	
2010	Undocumented	Klaus	
2010	Chain Letter	Dante	
2011	Guadalupe the Virgin	Benny	
2012	Looper	Kid Blue	
2012	The Frozen	The Hunter	
2014	Starry Eyes	Danny	
2014	Redeemer	Steve Bradock	Also producer
2015	Some Kind of Hate	Krauss	Also executive producer
2015	War Pigs	Private / Corporal August Chambers	
2015	Tales of Halloween	Bart	Segment: "The Weak and the Wicked"
2015	The Mind's Eye	Travis Levine	
2015	Follow	Quinn	
2016	Hot	Horn	
2017	Chuck Hank and the San Diego Twins	Rathead	
2017	Get the Girl	Patrick	
2017	Cardinal X	Lior	
2017	Mohawk	Yancy	
2017	Camera Obscura	Walt	
2017	Star Wars: The Last Jedi	Stomeroni Starck	
2019	Knives Out	Trooper Wagner	
2019	Scare Package	Husband	Segment: "M.I.S.T.E.R."; also director and co-writer
2020	The Pale Door	Truman	
2022	Blood Relatives	Francis	Also director, writer and producer
2022	Glass Onion: A Knives Out Mystery	Derol	
2025	Wake Up Dead Man	Nikolai	
2026	The Only Living Pickpocket in New York	—N/a	Director and writer

=== Television ===
Year	Title	Role	Notes
1990	The Baby-Sitters Club	Derek Masters	Episode: "Jessi and the Mystery of the Stolen Secrets"
1991	Loving	John Roger "J.J." Forbes, Jr. #3	
1993	Grace Under Fire	Quentin Kelly	Episode: "Pilot"
1995	Married... with Children	Robby Bennett	Episode: "The Undergraduate"
1996–2000	KaBlam!	Henry	Voice; 48 episodes
1999	101% Whizbang With Henry and June	Henry	Voice; 7 episodes
1999–2000	U-Pick Live	Henry	Voice; 30 episodes
2003	Dawson's Creek	George	Episode: "Castaways"
2003	CSI: Crime Scene Investigation	Kelly James	Episode: "Homebodies"
2004	NCIS	Kyle Hendricks	Episode: "One Shot, One Kill"
2007	Days of Our Lives	Conner Lockhart	5 episodes
2010	House	William	Episode: "Knight Fall"
2013	Breaking Bad	Fireman	Episode: "Ozymandias"
2018	Chicago Fire	Nate Isaacs	Episode: "The F Is For"
2019	Single Parents	Warren	Episode: "Good Holidays to You"
2020	The George Lucas Talk Show	Himself	Episodes: "May the AR Be LI$$ You" (Arli$$ marathon fundraiser) and "The George Lucas Holiday Special"
2021	Mr. Corman	Sam	2 episodes
2023, 2025	Poker Face	Sheriff Parker, Lew Dundee	Episodes: "Dead Man's Hand" and "Hometown Hero"
