= Nick Annas =

Australian actor (born 2005)

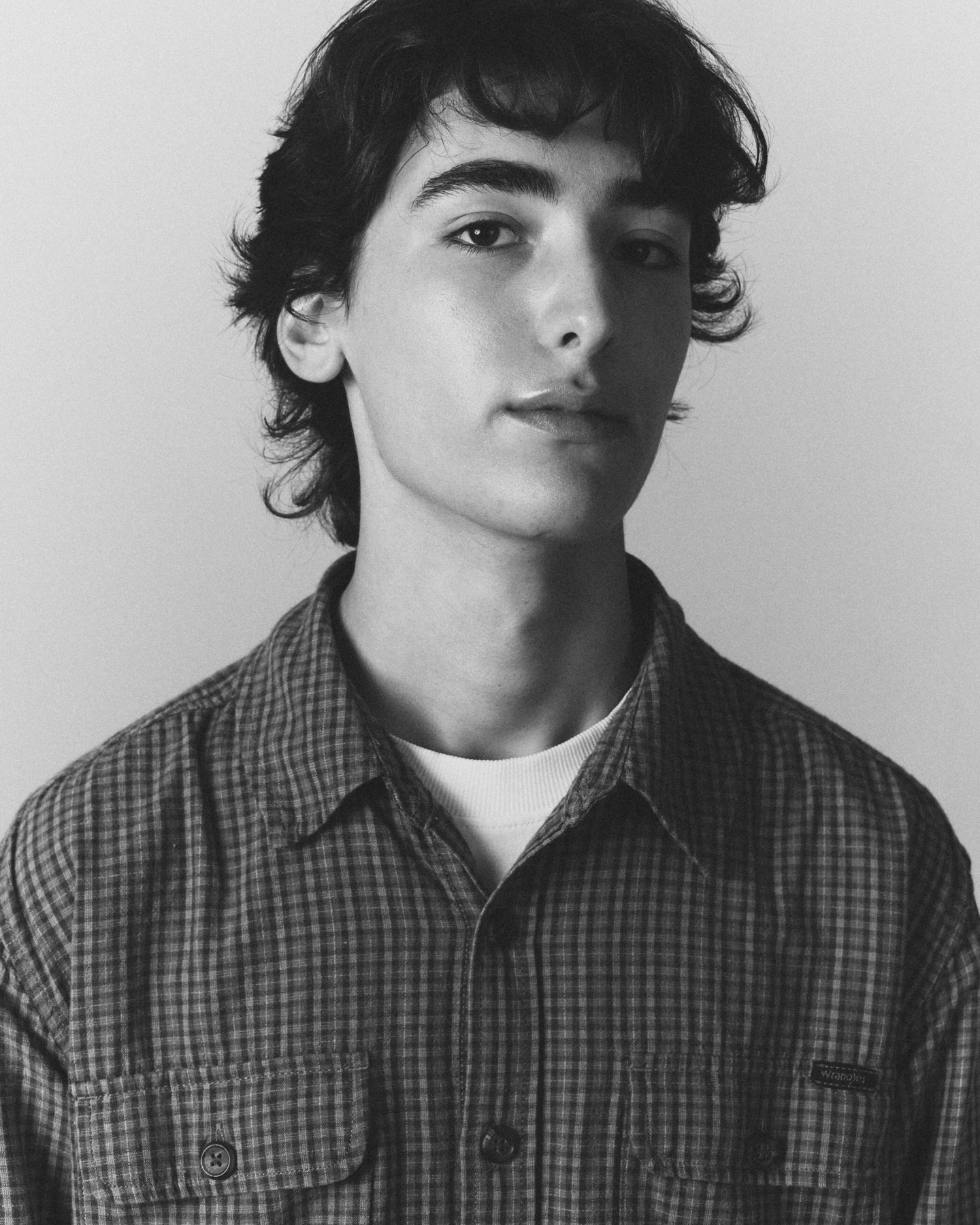
- Annas in 2025
- Born: November 25, 2005 (age 20); Sydney, Australia
- Education: The McDonald College
- Occupations: Actor, writer, director
- Years active: 2015-present

Nick Annas (born November 25, 2005) is an Australian actor. He began his career as a child, notably featuring in the ABC Original series Soundtrack to Our Teenage Zombie Apocalypse (2022), the BBC and Stan co-production The Tourist (2021), and George Miller's Furiosa: A Mad Max Saga (2024). He wrote, directed, and starred in the upcoming Gen-Z thriller Crashout at 19, his feature directorial debut.

== Early life and education ==
Nick Annas was born in Sydney. He attended The McDonald College of The Arts on a drama scholarship, graduating Dux of his class in 2023.

== Career ==
Annas began his career in acting, with roles in both film and television. His film credits include Furiosa: A Mad Max Saga (2024) and Die Bully Die (2024). He also appeared in Scare Package II: Rad Chad's Revenge (2022) as Cooper. On television, Annas starred as Nick in Soundtrack to Our Teenage Zombie Apocalypse (2022) which spanned 10 episodes, and portrayed Young Kosta Panigiris (played by Alex Dimitriades) in The Tourist (2022).

In addition to his work in film and television, Annas has been involved in the Australian theatre scene, starring in Past the Shallows, a stage adaptation of Favel Parrett's novel, directed by Ben Winspear. The production premiered at the Theatre Royal in Hobart before touring nationally to critical acclaim.

As a writer, Annas penned his debut feature screenplay, Herschel, at the age of 14. Herschel gained significant recognition in The Academy's prestigious Nicholl Fellowship in 2024.

In 2025, it was announced that Annas was preparing to direct his debut feature film, Crashout, a Gen-Z satirical thriller. The film will be produced by Enzo Tedeschi and Helen Tuck for Deadhouse Films, with theatrical distribution in Australia and New Zealand handled by Umbrella Entertainment. Annas originally wrote the screenplay at age seventeen.

In February 2026, it was reported that Crashout will star Catherine Laga'aia, marking her first film role following her casting in Disney's live-action Moana.
