= USC School of Dramatic Arts =

Private drama school at the University of Southern California

Coordinates: 34.023056°N 118.285833°W

- Type: Private drama school
- Established: 1945
- Parent institution: University of Southern California
- Dean: Emily Roxworthy (2021-present)
- Academic staff: 29
- Undergraduates: 580
- Postgraduates: 52
- Location: Los Angeles, California, United States
- Website: dramaticarts.usc.edu

The USC School of Dramatic Arts (commonly referred to as SDA)—formerly the USC School of Theatre, is a private drama school at the University of Southern California in Los Angeles, California. It is ranked one of the top 10 dramatic arts schools in the world, according to The Hollywood Reporter's Top 25 Drama Schools. The school offers Bachelor of Arts degrees in theatre and visual & performing arts; Bachelor of Fine Arts degrees in acting, design, musical theatre, sound design, stage management and technical direction; and Master of Fine Arts degrees in acting.

== History ==
Founded in 1945 as Department of Drama at USC, it became an independent school in 1991 and was named USC School of Theatre. It was renamed USC School of Dramatic Arts on July 1, 2012.

In 2020, Dean David Bridel resigned after admitting to an affair with an undergraduate. Emily Roxworthy serves as the current dean of the school.

== Notable faculty ==
- Andy Robinson - actor (Dirty Harry, Star Trek: Deep Space Nine) and founder of the MFA in Acting Program at the USC School of Dramatic Arts.
- Michael Keenan - actor (Picket Fences) and professor of acting and directing; directed USC plays and stage productions from 1987 to 2015
- Anna Deavere Smith - playwright, actress, author, journalist; taught acting in the MFA program from 1985 to 1989.

== Notable SDA alumni ==
- Patrick J. Adams
- Robin Bain
- Leigh-Allyn Baker
- Todd Black
- Nathan Parsons
- Troian Bellisario
- Beck Bennett
- LeVar Burton
- Sophia Bush
- Shohreh Aghdashloo
- Sorel Carradine
- Tate Donovan
- Anthony Edwards
- Ryan Eggold
- Will Harris
- Evan Helmuth (1999)
- Devin Kelley
- Eric Ladin
- James Lesure
- Peter Levine
- Alexander Ludwig
- Kevin Mambo
- Perry Mattfeld
- Timothy Omundson
- J. August Richards
- John Ritter
- Jon Rudnitsky
- Stark Sands
- Kyra Sedgwick
- James Snyder (actor)
- Anthony Sparks
- Richard Speight Jr.
- Karan Soni
- Eric Stoltz
- Danny Strong
- Andy Tennant
- TJ Thyne
- Michael Uppendahl
- Peter Vack
- Forest Whitaker
- Deborah Ann Woll
- Colin Woodell

== Programs of study ==
- Undergraduate Degrees
  - Bachelor of Arts (BA)
    - BA in Theatre
    - BA in Theatre, Acting Emphasis
    - BA in Theatre, Comedy Emphasis
    - BA in Theatre, Design Emphasis
    - BA in Theatre, Directing Emphasis
    - BA in Theatre, Musical Theatre Emphasis
    - BA in Visual & Performing Arts
  - Bachelor of Fine Arts (BFA)
    - BFA in Acting
    - BFA in Musical Theatre
    - BFA in Sound Design
    - BFA in Stage Management
    - BFA in Technical Direction
    - BFA in Theatrical Design
- Graduate Degrees
  - Master of Fine Arts (MFA)
    - MFA in Acting

== Performance Venues ==
- Bing Theater
- Dramatic Arts Building (DAB)
  - Sanctuary Theater
  - Stop Gap Theater
- McClintock Theater
- Scene Dock Theater

== Theatrical Productions ==
The School of Dramatic Arts presents more than 20 theatrical shows annually that showcase the works of the students in acting, musical theatre, stage management, lighting design, set design, costume design, technical direction and more.
