= Scare Package II: Rad Chad's Revenge =

2022 American horror film

- Directed by: Aaron B. Koontz ("Scare Package II: Rad Chad's Revenge"); Alexandra Barreto ("Welcome to the 90s"); Anthony Cousins ("The Night He Came Back Again! Part VI: The Night She Came Back"); Jed Shepherd ("Special Edition"); Rachele Wiggins ("We're So Dead")
- Screenplay by: Alexandra Barreto ("Welcome to the 90s"); Cameron Burns and Aaron B. Koontz ("We're So Dead" and Scare Package II: Rad Chad's Revenge"); Anthony Cousins and John Karsko ("The Night He Came Back Again! Part VI: The Night She Came Back"); Jed Shepherd ("Special Edition")
- Produced by: Aaron B. Koontz; Cameron Burns; Alex Euting; Ashleigh Snead; Shawn Talley; Helen Tuck
- Cinematography: Andrew Scott Baird; Chris Bland ("We're So Dead"); Ciaron Craig ("Special Edition"); Robert Patrick Stern ("The Night He Came Back Again! Part VI: The Night She Came Back")
- Edited by: Aaron B. Koontz; Alex Euting; John Cole ("We're So Dead"); Ciaron Craig ("Special Edition"); Richard Louprasong ("The Night He Came Back Again! Part VI: The Night She Came Back")
- Production company: Paper Street Pictures
- Distributed by: Shudder
- Release date: December 22, 2022 (United States)
- Running time: 98 minutes
- Country: United States
- Language: English

Scare Package: Rad Chad's Revenge is a 2022 American anthology horror comedy film created by Aaron B. Koontz and Cameron Burns. It features a series of horror shorts written and directed by Aaron B. Koontz, Alexandra Barreto, Anthony Cousins, Jed Shepherd, and Rachele Wiggins.

The film was released exclusively on Shudder on December 22, 2022.

== Plot ==
The film is presented as an anthology of short horror films, built into a frame narrative that acts as its own horror film.

== Cast ==
=== "Scare Package II: Rad Chad's Revenge" ===
- Jeremy King as Chad Buckley / Bo Buckley
- Zoe Graham as Jessie
- Byron Brown as Sam
- Rich Sommer as Rick
- Kelli Maroney as Ms. Kapowski
- Shakira Ja'Nai Paye as Kimmie
- Graham Skipper as Dwight
- Maria Olson as Moira
- Dustin Rhodes as Devil's Lake Impaler
- Kirk Johnson as Kirk
- Bruce Davis as Bert
- Jennifer Rader
- Joe Bob Briggs as Himself
- Diana Prince as Darcy the Mail Girl
- Hawn Tran as Hawn
- Josephine McAdam as Kelly
- Aaron B. Koontz as Rad puppet (voice)
- Ernie the Lizard as himself
- Ginger Nixon as Funeral Fan (voice)
- Chase Williamson as Pete (archival footage)
- Andre Williams as Craig (archival footage)
- Justin Maina as Brandon (archival footage)
- Kelsey Pribilski as Christine (archival footage)
- Baron Vaughn as Bruce (archival footage)
- Jon Michael Simpson as Mike Myers (archival footage)
- Extras
  - Dan Deguisti
  - Lindsay Ross
  - Kelyn Hancock
  - Adelaide Starling
  - Ace Vasquez
  - Rianna Nauni
  - Sarah Stubbs

=== "Welcome to the 90s" ===
- Steph Barkley as Buffy
- Shaina Schrooten as Nancy
- Luxy Banner as Ginny
- Stef Estep-Gozalo as Ellen
- Elizabeth Trieu as Sally
- Shwa Miller as Tony the Killer
- Joshua Thompson as Frat Guy
- Brian Nixon as Ice Cream Vendor
- Allison Sugimoto as Laurie
- Extras
  - Kelli Cormack
  - Nicholas Homsher
  - Jennifer Pullen
  - Cam Snowd
  - Marianne Edem
  - Lily Nicholas
  - David Rodriguez Jr.
  - Kelyn Hancock
  - Scotty Orr
  - Lucas Schrantz
  - Ellie Valdez

=== "The Night He Came Back Again! Part V: The Night She Came Back" ===
- Chelsey Grant as Daisy
- Jack Hartwig as Will
- Michael Paul Levin as Dr. Castle
- Alex Galick as Scott
- Tom Ringberg as The Killer

=== "Special Edition" ===
- Haley Bishop as Rachel
- Radina Drandova as Charlie
- Jemma Moore as Zoe
- Caroline Ward as Jenny
- Emma Louise Webb as Helena

=== "We're So Dead" ===
- Luc Barrett as Jason
- Adelaide Kennedy as Ellie
  - Helen Tuck as Adult Ellie
- Nick Annas as Cooper
  - Dean Kyrwood as Adult Cooper
- Chinmaya Rao as Stats
- Paul Ayre as Dead Guy
  - Vince Mikus as Dead Guy stand-in
- Barbara Bingham as Jason's Mom Karen
- Piper Lowe as Jason's Sister
- Pallavi Pillay as Stats' Mom (voice)
- Tiberius Trimble as Tabernacle "Tabby" the Cat

== Release ==
The film premiered at Fright Fest in August, before streaming exclusively on Shudder on December 22, 2022.

== Reception ==
Matthew Mahler of MovieWeb gave the film a positive review, saying its a "superior and superbly silly sequel".

== Sequel ==
Koontz has said that he hoped to make a third Scare Package film with Shudder.
