= Best Friends Forever (film) =

- Directed by: Brea Grant
- Written by: Brea Grant; Vera Miao
- Produced by: Vera Miao; Stacey Storey
- Starring: Brea Grant; Vera Miao
- Cinematography: Michelle Lawler
- Edited by: Jacob Chase; Amy McGrath
- Music by: Matthew Puckett
- Production companies: Storeyteller Films; Pacer Car Productions
- Release date: January 20, 2013 (Slamdance Film Festival)
- Running time: 80 minutes
- Country: United States
- Language: English

Best Friends Forever is a 2013 American female buddy road comedy film directed by Brea Grant and written and starring Brea Grant and Vera Miao. The film premiered at the 2013 Slamdance Film Festival.

== Plot ==
Harriet and Reba take their '76 AMC Pacer on the open road and instead get a wild ride towards an impending nuclear holocaust in downtown Los Angeles.

== Cast ==
- Brea Grant as Harriet
- Vera Miao as Reba
- Glen Powell as Nick
- Tamara Rey as Olivia
- Constance Wu as Melanie
- Sean Maher as Sean
- Sean Riggs as Chris
- Mylinda Royer as Lesly
- Stacey Storey as Amanda
- Kit Williamson as Kit
- Tom Fox Davies as Sebastian
- Ben Hethcoat as Kyle
- Riccardo LeBron as Austinite
- Grace Yang Vitali as Reba's mom
- Christopher Jon Martin as sheriff
- Stevin Espinoza as Mattias
- Nora Nagatani as woman
- Leslie Chappell as woman
- Alex Berg as Alex 1
- Alex Fernie as Alex 2

== Reception ==
On review aggregator website Rotten Tomatoes the film has a score of 50% based on reviews from 6 critics, with an average rating of 4.5/10.

John DeFore of The Hollywood Reporter wrote "The destruction of Los Angeles isn't enough to enliven this muddled road movie".
