= Pat Healy (actor) =

American film and television actor (born 1971)

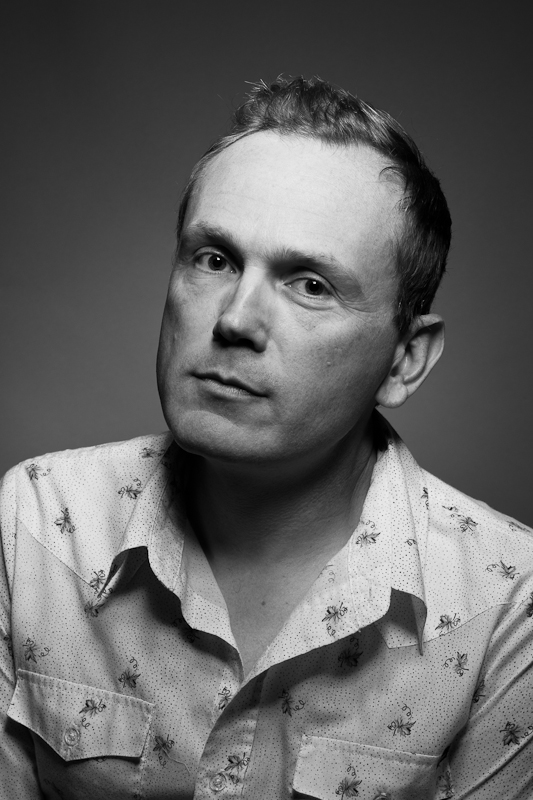
- Healy in 2012
- Born: September 14, 1971 (age 54); Chicago, Illinois, U.S.
- Occupations: Actor; screenwriter; director; producer
- Years active: 1997–present
- Spouse: Maggie Mull (m. 2024)

Pat Healy (born September 14, 1971) is an American film and television actor, best known for his roles in Magnolia, Better Call Saul, Great World of Sound, Compliance, Killers of the Flower Moon, and Station 19, in which he was upgraded to the main cast in 2022. He directed his first feature film, Take Me, in 2017.

== Life and career ==
Healy was born in Chicago, Illinois, where his career began at the Steppenwolf Theatre. He moved to Los Angeles in 1998, where he quickly landed a memorable supporting role in Paul Thomas Anderson's Magnolia as the pharmacist on the receiving end of Julianne Moore's profane meltdown. He has since appeared in over thirty feature films, including Ghost World, The Assassination of Jesse James by the Coward Robert Ford, Rescue Dawn, Captain America: The Winter Soldier, Draft Day, Harmony and Me, Dirty Girl, Snow Angels, Undertow, Pearl Harbor, and Home Alone 3.

In 2007, Healy played the lead in Great World of Sound, an independent film directed by Craig Zobel and produced by David Gordon Green. The film premiered at the Sundance Film Festival, and Healy was the recipient of the Atlanta Film Festival Best Actor Award. Healy also appeared in Zobel's follow-up, Compliance, as a prank caller that incites a series of disturbing events at a fast food restaurant. He starred in Ti West's horror film The Innkeepers and in Cheap Thrills, alongside Ethan Embry, Sara Paxton and David Koechner. The dark comedy, directed by E.L. Katz, won the Midnight Films Audience Award at South by Southwest in 2013 before its acquisition by Alamo Drafthouse.

On television, Healy has appeared on Six Feet Under, Star Trek: Enterprise, 24, Grey's Anatomy, The Shield, CSI: Crime Scene Investigation, Without a Trace, NCIS, Cold Case, Charmed, CSI: Miami, Chicago Hope, NYPD Blue, and The Practice. He had a recurring role as the villain Sugalski on Eagleheart, as well as a celebrity guest appearance in Metalocalypse on Adult Swim.

In 2000, Healy wrote and directed the short film Mullitt, starring himself, Michael Shannon and Henry Gibson. The film premiered at the 2001 Sundance Film Festival before being acquired by HBO. His feature scripts Snow Ponies and Strange Skies landed spots on the Black List in 2006 and 2007, respectively. He has also written three episodes of HBO's In Treatment, Weeks 1–3 of Walter (John Mahoney)'s sessions in Season Two.

Healy's feature directorial debut Take Me premiered at Tribeca Film Festival in April 2017. The film was produced by Duplass Brothers Productions and stars Healy alongside Taylor Schilling. It was acquired by The Orchard for a May 2017 release.

In 2022, Healy took over the role of Jeff in the sixth and final season of Better Call Saul from Don Harvey.

== Filmography ==
=== Film ===
Year	Title	Role	Notes
1997	Stricken	Townie #1	
1997	Home Alone 3	Agent Rogers	
1999	Treasure Island	Clark	
1999	The Opera Lover	Al	
1999	Magnolia	Sir Edmund William Godfrey / Young Pharmacy Kid	
2000	More Dogs Than Bones	Leon	
2000	The Prime Gig	Wendell	
2001	Pearl Harbor	Newsreel Guy	
2001	Ghost World	John Ellis	
2003	I Love Your Work	Connor	
2004	Undertow	Grant the Mechanic	
2005	The Aviary	Cabbie	
2005	In Memory of My Father	Pat	
2005	Dirty	Ronnie	
2006	Rescue Dawn	Norman	
2006	Mr. Fix It	Bill Smith	
2007	Snow Angels	Nursing Home Operator	
2007	Great World of Sound	Martin	
2007	The Assassination of Jesse James by the Coward Robert Ford	Wilbur Ford	
2007	The Red Sandwich Christmas Hour		
2009	Spooner	Carl	
2009	Harmony and Me	Matt	
2010	Dirty Girl	Billy	
2011	The Innkeepers	Luke	
2012	Compliance	Officer Daniels	
2013	Cheap Thrills	Craig Daniels	
2014	Starry Eyes	Carl	
2014	Captain America: The Winter Soldier	Hydra scientist #1	
2014	Draft Day	Jeff Carson	
2015	Henry Gamble's Birthday Party	Bob Gamble	
2015	No Way Jose	Lawrence	
2015	Tales of Halloween	Forensic Bob	Segment: "Bad Seed"
2015	Freaks of Nature	Zombie Priest	
2016	Lend a Hand for Love	Clarence	Short
2016	Carnage Park	Wyatt Moss	
2016	Everlasting	Henrique	
2016	Pandemic	Doctor Ward	
2016	Teenage Cocktail	Frank Lustig	
2016	Rebirth	Jesse	
2016	Poor Boy	Vern Rickey	
2017	Small Crimes	Junior Vassey	
2017	Take Me	Ray Moody	Also director
2017	The Post	Phil Geyelin	
2018	American Woman	Ray	
2018	Donnybrook	Eldon	
2018	Dealer	Mr. X	
2019	Velvet Buzzsaw	Man from Perlack	
2019	Bad Education	District Attorney	
2020	Dinner in America	Norman	
2020	Run	Tom	
2020	The Pale Door	Wylie	
2021	We Need to Do Something	Robert	
2023	Killers of the Flower Moon	John Burger	
TBA	Nightwatching	TBA	Filming

=== Television ===
Year	Title	Role	Notes
1998	Profiler	Kyle	Episode: "Double Vision"
1998	The Practice	Russell Thurm	Episode: "Swearing In"
1999	Turks	Don Bracey	Episode: "Pilot"
1999	NYPD Blue	Steve Jung	3 episodes
1999	Chicago Hope	Asst. Surgeon Ted Manakas	Episode: "Vigilance and Care"
1999	Hefner: Unauthorized	Eldon Sellers	TV movie
2001	Angel	Doug Sanders	Episode: "Disharmony"
2001	Dead Last	Ticket Cop	Episode: "He Who Smelt It"
2001	Philly	Richie Turner	Episode: "Truth or Consequence"
2002	Russian Roulette	Himself	Episode: "October 14, 2002"
2003	CSI: Miami	Keith Sewell	Episode: "Bunk"
2003	Charmed	Xavier	Episode: "Nymphs Just Wanna Have Fun"
2004	Six Feet Under	Byron	2 episodes
2004	Cold Case	Warden Wilbur 1968	Episode: "The House"
2005	NCIS	Jonathan Hanlan	Episode: "The Meat Puzzle"
2005	Without a Trace	Mark Ryan	Episode: "Neither Rain Nor Sleet"
2005	Blind Justice	Kent Newell	Episode: "Four Feet Under"
2005	CSI: Crime Scene Investigation	Jared Obstfeld	Episode: "4x4"
2005	Star Trek: Enterprise	Alien Slave	Episode: "In a Mirror, Darkly, Part II"
2005	The Shield	Mike Fletcher	Episode: "Cut Throat"
2006	Grey's Anatomy	Tom Russell	2 episodes
2006	Night Stalker	Paul Krieger	Episode: "What's the Frequency, Kolchak?"
2006	Las Vegas	Barry Barona	Episode: "Fidelity, Security, Delivery"
2007	24	Marcus	Episode: "Day 6: 8:00 a.m.-9:00 a.m."
2012	Metalocalypse	Dr. Richard Reinhold Rnawighiwowpj (voice)	Episode: "Motherklok"
2013	Sanjay and Craig	Dude / Geography Guy / Zombie (voice)	Episode: "Blackout/Family Re-Noodman"
2013–2014	Eagleheart	Sugalski	6 episodes
2014	How to Get Away with Murder	Dennis	Episode: "Kill Me, Kill Me, Kill Me"
2015	Backstrom	Leon Mundy	Episode: "Takes One to Know One"
2015	Ray Donovan	Jeff Barker	Episode: "Poker"
2016	The Grinder	Coleman	Episode: "The Retooling of Dean Sanderson"
2016	Shameless	Lester	2 episodes
2016	Dice		Episode: "Six Grand"
2016	Blunt Talk		3 episodes
2017	Under the Bed	Stalker	TV movie
2018	Hap and Leonard	Truman Brown	4 episodes
2019	The Edge of Sleep	The Trespasser	4 episodes; podcast series
2020–2023	Station 19	Michael Dixon	21 episodes
2020	Interrogation	Robert Sullivan	2 episodes
2021	Them	Marty Dixon	5 episodes
2022	Better Call Saul	Jeff (Note: He replaces Don Harvey in this role due to Harvey's previous commitments)	Recurring (season 6); 3 episodes
2022	George & Tammy	Don Chapel	2 episodes
