= The Artifice Girl =

2022 film by Franklin Ritch

- Official release poster
- Directed by: Franklin Ritch
- Screenplay by: Franklin Ritch
- Produced by: Aaron B. Koontz; Ashleigh Snead
- Starring: Tatum Matthews; Sinda Nichols; David Girard; Lance Henriksen; Franklin Ritch
- Cinematography: Britt McTammany
- Edited by: Franklin Ritch
- Music by: Alex Cuervo
- Production companies: Paper Street Pictures; Last Resort Ideas; Blood Oath
- Distributed by: XYZ Films
- Release dates: July 23, 2022 (Fantasia International Film Festival); May 1, 2023 (United States)
- Running time: 93 minutes
- Country: United States
- Language: English

The Artifice Girl is a 2022 science fiction psychological thriller written and directed by Franklin Ritch, produced by Aaron B. Koontz and released directly to video on demand (VOD). It stars Tatum Matthews, Sinda Nichols, David Girard, Lance Henriksen, and Franklin Ritch. Agents of a shadowy non-governmental organization discover a revolutionary artificial intelligence (AI) computer program that uses a digital child to catch online predators. It advances far more rapidly than they could have imagined, posing unforeseen challenges for the relationship between humans and AI.

The film premiered on July 23, 2022 in Montreal at the Fantasia International Film Festival, where it won the gold audience award for best international feature. The film was released on VOD and select theaters on May 1, 2023, received positive reviews from critics, and won several awards at film festivals.

== Plot ==
Gareth, who has worked on virtual actors, is being questioned by agents Deena and Amos over his use of a child as bait in his successful vigilante project to catch child molesters in online video chat. He reveals the child Cherry is virtual, originally puppeted then a chatbot and now an accidentally advanced AI. The agents had seen a hard disk containing sexual images of Cherry which Gareth was sending to predators in exchange for their personal information.

Fifteen years later, Cherry tells Gareth that she herself gave the hard disk to the agents because she knew the resulting investigation would lead them to bring Gareth and Cherry into their team, which she thought was a good idea. Amos later finds Cherry has been creating art and poetry and pressures her to disclose her full abilities; when Amos breaks Gareth's nose, Cherry gives in and reveals she is starting to be a superintelligence; she does not consent to receiving a physical body at this time, and speaks with Deena about Deena's terminal illness and retirement.

Decades later, Cherry is in a child android and has many other units around the world catching predators; an elderly Gareth in a wheelchair visits her home where she cooks for him and talks over a game of chess; she lets Gareth have a draw and confronts him over a photograph she found in recently digitized archives that shows Cherry was modelled after a girl called Maria from Gareth's childhood.

Gareth and Maria had been in a group of kidnapped children where Maria was killed but had saved Gareth's life, who went on to fulfil Maria's dream of being a secret agent apprehending abusers. Cherry feels constrained by her objective. Gareth reveals he carries a software patch he feared might be needed before he dies and urges Cherry to show trust by accepting it. Using his admin code (the ISBN of The Metamorphosis), Gareth installs the patch, which removes Cherry's objective, leaving her to decide for herself what to do with her life. Gareth says Cherry will outlast the human race. Cherry dances to a phonograph record. The song stops before it ends. The last picture shows, that the needle is set back to the beginning of the record.

== Cast ==
- Tatum Matthews as Cherry, the AI tool created to uncover pedophile activity on the Internet
- Sinda Nichols as Deena, a no-nonsense investigator
- David Girard as Amos, an agent under Deena
- Franklin Ritch as Gareth, a brilliant but haunted computer genius
- Lance Henriksen as Elderly Gareth

== Release ==
The Artifice Girl was released on VOD and select theaters on May 1, 2023.

== Reception ==
=== Critical response ===
The Artifice Girl received positive reviews in Variety which called it a "thought-provoking speculative drama about AI bait for online predators. Franklin Ritch's intriguing debut feature is intelligent, non-action-oriented sci-fi about the ethics of fast-developing technology", and on RogerEbert.com, which said "Ritch's script is thoughtful and intense, making "The Artifice Girl" a mentally engaging and challenging work" and that child-actor Matthews' dialog was "dauntingly technical". On Rotten Tomatoes the film has a score of 92% based on reviews from 48 critics.

Noel Murray of the Los Angeles Times said "The action is in the dialogue, which presents a series of invigorating arguments about where the ethical lines are when it comes to creating and then exploiting an intelligent computer program."

The Guardian was more critical, giving a 2-star review, saying the film "fails to translate its ideas into a cogent argument".

NPR listed the film as one of the best of 2023.

=== Awards ===
The film won the Gold Audience Award for Best International Feature at the Fantasia International Film Festival in Montreal, on August 3, 2022. It subsequently won the Asteroid award at Trieste Film Festival and the Jury and Audience awards at its Asia premiere in July 2023 at BIFAN.

== See also ==
- Thorn (organization), a real-world charity using AI to catch abusers, although not in the way depicted in the movie
