= Complete Works (web series) =

- Genre: Comedy
- Created by: Joe Sofranko; Adam North
- Written by: Joe Sofranko; Adam North
- Directed by: Joe Sofranko; Adam North
- Starring: Joe Sofranko; Lili Fuller; Kevin Quinn; Vicki Lewis; Chase Williamson; Ben Sidell; Lizzie Fabie; Alex Skinner; Michael Keenan; Laurie O'Brien; Daniel Montgomery; Robert Merrill; Jason Greene; Jessica Pennington
- Composer: Mike Kramer
- Country of origin: United States
- Original language: English
- No. of seasons: 1
- No. of episodes: 5

Production
- Executive producers: Joe Sofranko; Adam North; Lili Fuller
- Producers: Giancarlo Balarezo; ETC Theatre Company
- Production location: Los Angeles, California
- Editors: Ben Baudhuin; Cassandra Chowdhury; Q. Heinrichs; James Lee Hernandez; Nadav Itzkowitz; Joe Sofranko
- Camera setup: Ben Winchell
- Running time: 22–24 minutes
- Production company: Kingdom For a Horse Productions

Original release
- Release: April 23 – July 1, 2014

Complete Works is a comedy web series first aired on the subscription website Hulu in 2014.

== Background ==
Complete Works was written, produced and directed by Joe Sofranko and Adam North. It starred Joe Sofranko, Lili Fuller, Kevin Quinn, Vicki Lewis, Chase Williamson, Ben Sidell, Lizzie Fabie, Alex Skinner, Michael Keenan, Laurie O'Brien, Daniel Montgomery, Robert Merrill, Jason Greene and Jessica Pennington. The series aired on Hulu and is available to Hulu Plus subscribers. The series premiered on Hulu on William Shakespeare's 450th birthday. The competition is modeled after the English-Speaking Union's National Shakespeare Competition, won by Sofranko in 2004.

The entire series was shot in 20 days and originally created to be a 14-episode webseries and was later re-edited into five 30-minute episodes.

== Plot ==
Complete Works is a half-hour comedy series set in the world of a collegiate Shakespeare competition. Hal, a naive Midwesterner attending community college, has been obsessed with Shakespeare since his Henry the Fourth birthday party. Winning the American Shakespeare Competition could pull him out of his boring life and give him the performing career he has always dreamed of. The only problem: he has never done an arts competition before. As he deals with the crazy challenges and the challenging crazies, Hal discovers that the road to victory is often paved with douchebag-ery.

== Cast ==
=== Main cast ===
- Joe Sofranko as Hal Evans
- Lili Fuller as Pauline Williams
- Kevin Quinn as James
- Vicki Lewis as Ashley Spitzer
- Chase Williamson as Oliver Belrose
- Ben Sidell as Ian Greenblatt
- Lizzie Fabie as Regan Conrad
- Alex Skinner as Leo Wood
- Michael Keenan as Damien George
- Laurie O'Brien as Deborah Hunterschmidt
- Daniel Montgomery as Loren Dalton
- Robert Merrill as Jonathan Taylor Turner

=== Recurring cast ===
- Jason Greene as Giorgio
- Jessica Pennington as Maria

== Episodes ==
No.	Title	Directed by	Written by	Original release date
1	"A Round Unvarnish'd Tale"	Joe Sofranko & Adam North	Joe Sofranko & Adam North	April 23, 2014
2	"Vaulting Ambition"	Joe Sofranko & Adam North	Joe Sofranko & Adam North	May 6, 2014
3	"The Green-Eyed Monster"	Joe Sofranko & Adam North	Joe Sofranko & Adam North	June 3, 2014
4	"My Offense Is Rank"	Joe Sofranko & Adam North	Joe Sofranko & Adam North	June 17, 2014
5	"Now Might I Do It Pat"	Joe Sofranko & Adam North	Joe Sofranko & Adam North	July 1, 2014
