= Old Man (film) =

2022 American film directed by Lucky McKee

- Official release poster
- Directed by: Lucky McKee
- Screenplay by: Joel Veach
- Produced by: Aaron B. Koontz; Marc Senter; Cameron Burns; Ashleigh Snead
- Starring: Stephen Lang; Marc Senter; Liana Wright-Mark; Patch Darragh
- Cinematography: Alex Vendler
- Edited by: Zach Passero
- Music by: Joe Kraemer
- Production companies: XYZ Films; Paper Street Pictures; Rubicon Entertainment; AMP International
- Distributed by: RLJE Films
- Release date: October 14, 2022 (United States)
- Running time: 97 minutes
- Country: United States
- Language: English
- Box office: $425,113

Old Man is a 2022 American horror thriller film directed by Lucky McKee from a screenplay by Joel Veach. The film stars Stephen Lang and Marc Senter.

== Plot ==
An old man wakes abruptly, alone in a cabin in the middle of the woods, and is very erratic and violent; calling for something or someone called Rascal, while also threatening to kill them if they ever return. A young hiker named Joe, who says he is lost in the woods, knocks at the cabin and is held at gunpoint by the old man, who demands to know if he knows Rascal's whereabouts or was sent by the old man's wife. The old man eventually lets Joe into the cabin but continues to be very tense about the whole situation, keeping his shotgun trained on Joe. While searching through Joe's belongings, the old man finds and keeps a knife and when Joe tries to run, he shoots at him and prevents him from leaving.

The old man and Joe tell each other stories. Joe talks about his unhappy home life, and says that he blacked out in the woods after hearing strange moans. The old man tells Joe a story about how he tortured and freed a Bible salesman that entered his home years ago and how he had heard similar strange moans in the woods. In the old man's case, they led to a leopard, which he stabbed in the neck and the head of which now hangs on the wall of the old man's cabin. While the old man leaves to make food, Joe retrieves his knife but discovers that it is coated in blood; he disappears from the cabin and is replaced by Rascal, who is revealed to be a man wearing black who bullies and scares the old man. Rascal forces the old man to open a chest in his living room, telling him that this way he will discover the truth about why his wife left him.

Upon opening the chest the old man has a vision of Joe, who is revealed to be a younger version of himself, in his old bedroom. Joe discovers his wife in the process of intercourse with the Bible salesman and, angered by the moans, shoots the praying salesman in the head with his shotgun; his wife attempts to run but is stabbed in the neck with the knife and killed as well. In the present, the old man begs a vision of his wife for forgiveness just as the salesman had in the flashback but she refuses. Rascal is revealed to be another version of Joe, forcing the old man to repeatedly relive memories of the double murder. Rascal leaves after putting the old man to bed. After a while, the old man wakes abruptly, ready to begin the memory loop once again.

== Cast ==
- Stephen Lang as Old Man
- Marc Senter as Joe / Rascal
- Liana Wright-Mark as Genie
- Patch Darragh as Bible Salesman

== Production ==
Principal photography began on January 20, 2021 and ended on March 10, 2021 in Newburgh, New York.

== Release ==
It had a limited theatrical release and on-demand in the United States by RLJ Entertainment on October 14, 2022. It was released in Russia as a prequel to Don't Breathe on November 10, 2022 and in the United Arab Emirates on January 19, 2023.

== Reception ==
=== Box office ===
Old Man grossed $425,113 worldwide from limited theatrical releases.

=== Critical response ===
On the review aggregator website Rotten Tomatoes, 63% of 30 critics' reviews are positive, with an average rating of 5.6/10. The website's consensus reads: "Stephen Lang is as magnetic as ever, but his finely layered performance isn't quite enough to distract from Old Man's predictable story." Metacritic, which uses a weighted average, assigned the film a score of 56 out of 100, based on 8 critics, indicating "mixed or average" reviews.
