= The Requin =

- Official release poster
- Directed by: Le-Van Kiet
- Written by: Le-Van Kiet
- Produced by: Cameron Burns; Jordan Dykstra; Aaron B. Koontz; Todd Lundbohm; Ashleigh Snead; Ellen Wander
- Starring: Alicia Silverstone; James Tupper
- Cinematography: Matt S. Bell
- Edited by: Tommy Aagaard
- Music by: Jean-Paul Wall
- Production companies: Film Bridge International; Paper Street Pictures
- Distributed by: Saban Films
- Release date: January 28, 2022
- Running time: 89 minutes
- Country: United States
- Language: English
- Budget: $8.5 million
- Box office: $130,493

The Requin (released as From Below in the UK) is a 2022 American horror thriller film written and directed by Le Van Kiet. Stranded at sea after a massive tropical storm, a woman and her injured husband fight for survival as great white sharks circle below. Starring Alicia Silverstone and James Tupper, the film was released to video on demand on January 28, 2022. The title, pronounced /ˈrɛkwɪn/ REK-win, is an archaic name for the great white shark or requiem shark, derived from French requin ("shark").

== Plot ==
Jaelyn and her husband, Kyle, are spending a holiday at a beach tourist retreat in Vietnam, housed in an overwater bungalow. Jaelyn is partially withdrawn and traumatized since she suffered a stillbirth during a homebirth, keeping contact with her family and friends mostly through social media; the trip is meant to restore her spirits again. However, on their second night, a violent tropical storm hits the resort. The bungalow is flooded and torn off its moorings, drifting away from the mainland, and Kyle's leg is severely injured.

As the days pass, Jaelyn and Kyle try to take stock of their situation and wait for rescue. When a ship passes by, they try to create a smoke signal, but the fire instead destroys their shelter, forcing them to abandon it and climb onto a floating piece of wooden flooring. As they drift, Kyle apologizes to his wife for leaving her alone to deal with her trauma, and they reconcile. Soon afterwards, a great white shark attacks their raft and bites off Kyle's legs, he begins to bleed to death. That night, the raft finally hits a beach; Jaelyn drags Kyle's body onto the sand and then collapses from exhaustion. As she wakes the next morning, the tide has come in, leaving Kyle floating in the water. Before Jaelyn can retrieve him, several sharks arrive and devour the body. When she wades back to shore, a shark attacks her and bites her leg before she can drive it off.

After recovering, Jaelyn walks off along the coastline until she meets a local fisherman in his coracle, who stitches her wounds; but as she falls asleep, he dives down to check his weir and is fatally attacked by the shark. As the shark then assaults the coracle, Jaelyn first drives it off by shredding its head with a handheld outboard engine. Enraged, the shark returns and upends the coracle. As Jaelyn frantically wraps the coracle's anchor rope around herself to stop herself from sinking, the shark comes in for another attack, but its jaws accidentally close around the boat's raised anchor, driving one of its flukes directly through its brain and killing it. Climbing onto the upside-down coracle, Jaelyn drifts to a fishing village, where she is soon spotted by fishermen on the beach.

== Cast ==
- Alicia Silverstone as Jaelyn
- James Tupper as Kyle
- Deirdre O'Connell as Anne
- Danny Chung as Fisherman
- Jennifer Mudge as Lizzie
- Kha Mai as Tour Guide

== Production ==
The film was shot at Universal Orlando and Full Sail University in Orlando, Florida and has nearly 1,000 VFX shots.

== Reception ==
On the review aggregator website Rotten Tomatoes, 18% of 17 critics' reviews are positive, with an average rating of 3.8/10. Simon Abrams, writing for RogerEbert.com, gave it 2 1/2 stars out of 4, concluding "I don't think you can really love The Requin based on its modest strengths, but there's enough here to make 89 minutes move a little faster."
