= Michael Keenan (actor) =

American actor and academic (1939–2020)

- Publicity Photo of Michael Keenan
- Born: December 12, 1939
- Died: April 30, 2020 (aged 80)

Michael Keenan (December 12, 1939 – April 30, 2020) was an American actor and academic. He was best known to television audiences for his portrayal of Mayor Bill Pugen in the CBS television series, Picket Fences, during the 1990s. Keenan, who taught acting and direction at the University of Southern California, also directed dozens of plays and stage productions at the USC School of Dramatic Arts between 1987 until 2015.

== Biography ==
Keenan was born in Los Angeles on December 12, 1939, but was raised in nearby Pasadena, California. In 1951, he became a choirboy with the San Francisco Opera. He graduated from Loyola High School, a Jesuit-run school in Los Angeles, and received his bachelor's degree from Santa Clara University.

Keenan, a prolific theater actor, appeared in more than 100 stage productions throughout his career, including shows at the San Diego Shakespeare Festival, Seattle Repertory Theatre, the Mark Taper Forum, the Ahmanson Theatre, and the South Coast Repertory. Notably, he starred in the Peter Hall's Broadway revival of Amadeus, where he portrayed Baron van Swieten, from 1999 to 2000. Keenan also directed stage productions at Occidental College, the Pasadena Playhouse, the Old Globe Theatre in San Diego's Balboa Park, the Tiffany Theater in West Hollywood, and the Asolo Repertory Theatre in Sarasota, Florida.

On television, Keenan was best known for playing Mayor Bill Pugen in the CBS television series, Picket Fences. His television credits included recurring and guest roles in Star Trek: The Next Generation, Star Trek: Deep Space Nine, and Star Trek: Voyager, as well as Cheers, Dallas, Hill Street Blues, WKRP in Cincinnati, and Quincy, M.E.. More recently, Keenan starred in the 2014 Hulu comedy series, Complete Works.

Keenan taught acting and directing at the University of Southern California for more than 25 years. Keenan also successfully taught at The American Academy of Dramatic Arts-at their Los Angeles Campus. Beginning in 1987, Keenan directed at least one play or other stage production for the USC School of Dramatic Arts until his retirement in 2015.

Michael Keenan died from natural causes at the Motion Picture & Television Country House and Hospital (MPTF) in the Woodland Hills neighborhood of Los Angeles on April 30, 2020, at the age of 80.
