= The Stylist =

2020 film by Jill Gevargizian

- Official release poster
- Directed by: Jill Gevargizian
- Written by: Jill Gevargizian; Eric Havens; Eric Stolze
- Produced by: Jill Gevargizian; Robert Patrick Stern; Sarah Sharp
- Starring: Najarra Townsend; Brea Grant
- Cinematography: Robert Patrick Stern
- Edited by: John Pata
- Music by: Nicholas Elert
- Production companies: Sixx Tape; Claw Productions; Method Media; The Line Film Company
- Distributed by: Arrow Films
- Release dates: September 25, 2020 (Fantastic Fest); March 1, 2021 (United States)
- Running time: 105 minutes
- Country: United States
- Language: English

The Stylist is a 2020 American horror drama film produced, co-written and directed by Jill Gevargizian. The film is based on the director's short film of the same name and stars Najarra Townsend and Brea Grant. The film premiered at the 2020 Fantastic Fest.

== Plot ==
Claire, a lonely hairdresser based in Kansas City, Missouri, is a murderer who discreetly kills and scalps her clients, storing their scalps in her cellar as a way to cope with feelings of self-loathing. Her friend Olivia asks Claire to do her hair for her upcoming wedding, which Claire agrees to. Claire tries to fit in with Olivia's friends, but is mocked for being socially awkward. After several failed attempts at suppressing her deadly urges, Claire finally gives in and murders Olivia. She then puts on Olivia's scalped hair and dress, and walks down the aisle pretending to be her. When the groom unveils her, he panics and the audience runs away in terror. Claire stays alone in the church crying, because even with Olivia's scalp, she can't get what she wanted.

== Cast ==
- Najarra Townsend as Claire
- Brea Grant as Olivia
- Davis DeRock as Charlie
- Sarah McGuire as Dawn
- Jennifer Seward as Sarah
- Millie Milan as Monique
- Kimberly Igla as Rose
- Laura Kirk as Frankie
- Chelsea Brown as Chelsea
- Bety Le as Christie
- Kelsey Nicholes as Elizabeth

== Release ==
The Stylist premiered at Fantastic Fest on September 25, 2020, and was subsequently screened at the Final Girls Berlin Film Festival on February 5, 2021, as well as screening in a Narrative Feature Competition at the Florida Film Festival in April 2021.

The film was released on Arrow, Arrow Films' streaming platform, on March 1, 2021, in the United States, Canada, and the United Kingdom. On June 8, 2021, it was released on Blu-ray, DVD, and video on demand platforms via Arrow Video. The Blu-ray version features a short film titled "The Stylist" (which was director's short film in 2016) and a new short "Pity" and "The Invisible Woman", a visual essay by author and critic Alexandra Heller-Nicholas. It also includes behind-the-scenes footage, outtakes, and location scouting.

== Reception ==
On review aggregator Rotten Tomatoes the film has a score of 90% based on reviews from 40 critics, with an average rating of 7.3/10 rating. The website's critics consensus reads, "A slasher with flair and crafty patience for the kill, The Stylist marks writer-director Jill Gevargizian as an uncommonly sharp genre filmmaker."

Not all critics reviewed the film positively. According to The Guardian's Peter Bradshaw, who gave the film one star out of five, "The acting and directing are entirely terrible, the editing and pacing are so sluggish you’ll feel as if you’re going into a persistent vegetative state, the plot is tiresomely unthought-through ... and the musical score is so pointless and undifferentiated it sounds like elevator muzak."

Starburst's Andrew Pollard called The Stylist "a brilliant movie", while Noel Murray of the Los Angeles Times described the film as a "treat for the eyes, making great use of color, lighting and women's fashions to create a world where attractive surfaces mask something ugly."

Kristy Strouse of Film Inquiry wrote, "The Stylist has everything one can want from a horror film; a talented female lead, lots of chills and bloody enticements, and a wickedly impressive style".

Simon Rother of The Horror News Network wrote, "The Stylist is nonetheless an interesting film that portrays the life of an extreme introvert who has difficulty coping with the social world, all while concealing a disturbing hobby and obsession".

Kat Hughes of The Hollywood News praised the film for its "[i]nherently feminine, gorgeously shot and styled [visuals]", as well as "[its] killer performances, sticky scalping's, and costumes to die for".

According to Meagan Navarro of Bloody Disgusting, "Gevargizian demonstrates a strong, clear vision for her sympathetic psychopath, and The Stylist presents as one of the more sophisticated depictions of a burgeoning serial killer".

Following film's screening at the Final Girls Berlin Film Festival, Erin Grant of the Fear Forever wrote "The Stylist is an incredibly insightful slasher with the right mix of sincerity and comedy".
