= Chase Williamson =

American actor and film producer (born 1988)

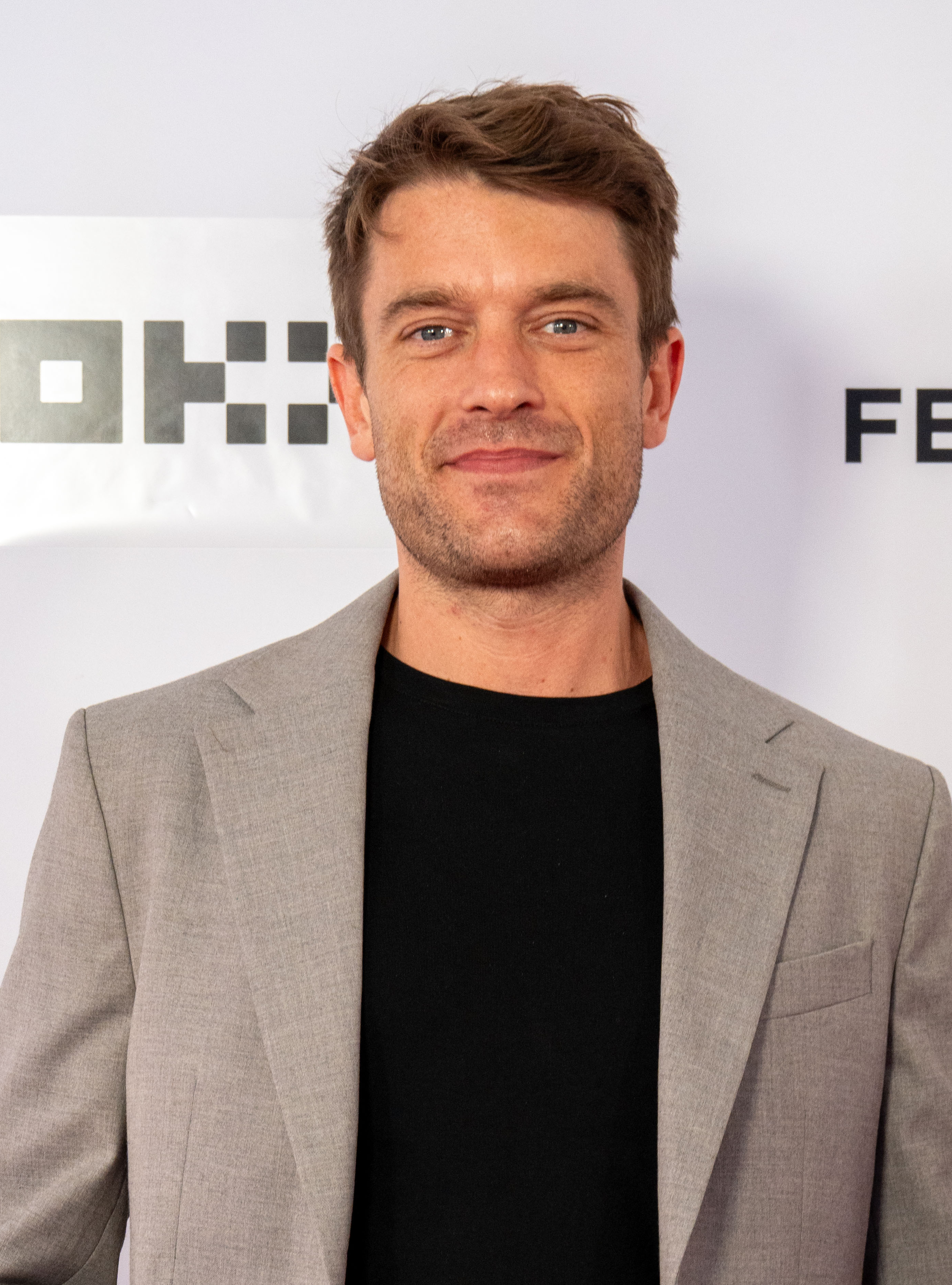
- Williamson in 2026
- Born: July 7, 1988 (age 38); Coral Springs, Florida, United States
- Education: University of Southern California
- Occupations: Actor, producer
- Years active: 2012–present

Chase Williamson (born July 7, 1988) is an American actor and film producer. He is best known for portraying David Wong in John Dies at the End (2012).

== Early life ==
Williamson was born in Coral Springs, Florida, in 1988. When he was young, he moved from Coral Springs to San Diego, then moved again to Texas. During his high school tenure, Williamson participated in "speech tournaments", where he would act against other competitors.

As he had been performing in theater for most of his life, he attended the University of Southern California's theater school, with the intent of becoming a professional stage actor.

He is openly gay.

== Career ==
One of Williamson's initial auditions in the first weeks after graduating from USC was for the role of David in John Dies at the End, a role he won; it was his first professional film. The film premiered at the 2012 Sundance Film Festival, and co-stars Rob Mayes, Clancy Brown, and Paul Giamatti. Later that year, he portrayed Moritz in Spring Awakening, a stage musical. His performance was well received by critics, with some calling him the standout performer.

In 2013, he played the title role in Sparks, a superhero noir film based on the graphic novel of the same name. The film reunited Williamson with Brown, and also stars Ashley Bell, William Katt, Jake Busey, and Clint Howard. After its premiere at the 2013 Cinequest Film Festival, the film was released digitally and straight to DVD on March 18, 2014. The same year, he joined the cast of Video Game High School in its second season. He portrays Shane Pizza, one of the show's antagonists. He also co-starred in The Guest, along with Dan Stevens. The film premiered at the 2014 Sundance Film Festival.

== Filmography ==
=== Film ===
| Year | Title | Role | Notes |
|---|---|---|---|
| 2004 | Life by Default | Benji | |
| 2006 | Ian Blackwell | Young Ian | |
| 2012 | John Dies at the End | David | |
| 2013 | Sparks | Ian Sparks | Also associate producer |
| 2014 | The Guest | Zeke Hastings | |
| 2015 | Ant-Man | Additional voices | |
| 2015 | Lace Crater | Ryan | |
| 2016 | Beyond the Gates | John Hardesty | |
| 2016 | Siren | Jonah | |
| 2017 | Sequence Break | Oz | |
| 2017 | Camera Obscura | Det. Ford | |
| 2017 | Victor Crowley | Alex | |
| 2017 | Bad Match | Robby | |
| 2017 | Dead Night | 1960's Guy | |
| 2017 | Cabaret of the Dead | Jake | |
| 2018 | All the Creatures Were Stirring | Ty | |
| 2019 | Artik | Holton | |
| 2019 | Greenlight | Jack Archer | |
| 2019 | Scare Package | Pete | segment "Horror Hypothesis" |
| 2020 | I Blame Society | Chase | Also co-screenwriter with Gillian Wallace Horvat |
| 2020 | Lucky | Charlie the medic | |
| 2022 | The Jessica Cabin | Nicky | |
| 2026 | Crooks | Johnny | Post-production |
| 2026 | Sour Minnows | Tepper | |

=== Television ===
| Year | Title | Role | Notes |
|---|---|---|---|
| 2016 | I Ship It | Chris | 5 episodes |
| 2017 | Dimension 404 | Private Adams | Episode: "Bob" |

=== Web series ===
| Year | Title | Role | Notes |
|---|---|---|---|
| 2013–14 | Video Game High School | Shane Barnstormer | Recurring; 11 episodes |
| 2014 | Complete Works | Oliver Belrose | |
| 2015–present | RocketJump: The Show | Multiple roles | Hulu-exclusive |
| 2015 | #Cybriety | Bradley | Episode: "Ally Has No Phone Numbers" |

=== Music video ===
- Neon Indian - Slumlord Rising (2015) as Informant Jogger
