= Beyond the Gates (2016 film) =

- Official poster
- Directed by: Jackson Stewart
- Written by: Stephen Scarlata; Jackson Stewart
- Produced by: Barbara Crampton; Amanda Mortimer
- Starring: Barbara Crampton; Brea Grant; Chase Williamson; Graham Skipper
- Cinematography: Brian Sowell
- Edited by: Josh Ethier
- Music by: Wojciech Golczewski
- Production companies: Destroy All Entertainment; Easy Open Productions; Lodger Films; Thunder Warrior Productions
- Distributed by: IFC Midnight; Scream Factory
- Release dates: June 2, 2016 (Los Angeles); December 9, 2016 (Theatrical)
- Running time: 84 minutes
- Country: United States
- Language: English
- Budget: $300,000

Beyond the Gates is a 2016 American horror film directed by Jackson Stewart and starring Barbara Crampton. It premiered on June 2, 2016, at the Los Angeles Film Festival where it won the audience award in the festival's midnight section.

== Plot ==
Two estranged brothers, Gordon and John Hardesty reunite at their missing father's video store after he has been missing for seven months. Later Gordon goes to their father's house where he is joined by his girlfriend, Margot. Margot and Gordon go to a local place for dinner where they meet John and his drifter friend Hank, who makes some crude comments to Margot, angering Gordon. Gordon and Margot return to his father's home to spend the night. Gordon wakes up suddenly at in the middle of the night upon hearing a noise and seeing a shadow on the street below. Looking at a shelf in the bedroom, Gordon he sees a key labeled "Office."

The next day, both brothers are back in the store packing up videos when Gordon suggests that they look in their father's office. While searching the office, they find a VCR board game called "Beyond the Gates," and the VHS game tape is in the VCR in the office, the last tape their father watched in the office, presumably before he disappeared. They play the tape, and a woman, Evelyn, asks them if they are willing to risk their souls to play the game. A bright flash and odd noise occur, and the brothers turn off the tape. When they go back into the store, a number of hours have passed.

That evening, John joins Gordon and Margot for dinner. After they tell her about the game, Margot suggests it would be fun to play it. When they put the tape in, Evelyn instructs Gordon ("the blue player") to stand in front of the TV, and asks the brothers if they have the courage to do what is necessary to save their father - namely to locate the "four keys." The gameboard has four key images at its corners. Disturbed by Evelyn's specific knowledge of them, they once again turn the game off. That evening, Gordon wakes at 3:13 again and goes downstairs to find the TV on with a static screen and he is soon joined by John and Margot. They are concerned enough that they call their friend Derek, a police officer, to have him look at the tape. This time, however, Evelyn just looks around the room when they play the tape, and all that Derek sees is just TV static. Annoyed, Derek leaves. They find a receipt in the game box and decide to go the store where the game was purchased in the morning.

The store is an odd occult store run by Elric, an odd mannered man. They ask him about the game, and he informs them that they must play the game to completion once it has started. As they are leaving, John steals a dagger resembling one in one of the game images.

As they proceed to play the game again, they are instructed to turn over the first of four large cards. The first card is "The Drifter," and they are instructed to dig up "The Drifter" in the garden and remove the key from his "diseased organs." Digging in their backyard, the men find a small tin with a ragdoll inside. At the same time, Hank is harassing his ex-girlfriend in a bar. When John cuts open the doll to take out the key, Hank is simultaneously and mysteriously disemboweled by an unseen force. John removes the key, surprised to find it covered in blood. Realizing what has happened, Gordon panics and turns over the other four cards, which resemble Derek ("The Noble"), Margot ("The Maiden") and their dad ("The Father"). When they put the key on the board, a gate appears in the basement. Later that night when the men turn back on the tape, they are instructed to take the next key from the head of the lawman, telling them they must choose between life and death. Gordon realizes The Maiden is Margot and throws the game in the trash, but the next morning, the gameboard has reappeared set up in the living room.

Meanwhile, Margot goes to see Elric, who tells her that the only two paths ahead of them are to play the game or die. She asks if anyone has ever beaten the game, to which he replies, "No, but you are welcome to try." He tells her the game always returns to his store every few years or so. Margot asks if the players bring it back, to which he replies they do not return the game.

Later that day, Derek attacks them with a shotgun, appearing to be in some sort of daze. As the men dive for cover, Gordon suddenly comes across a small grey plastic head with a key sticking out of it. Reluctant to pull the key, he is forced to do so when Derek points the shotgun at his head. He pulls the small key out of the head, causing Derek's head to explode, revealing the second key.

At this point, Gordon goes to be alone, and Margot and John talk about the brothers' childhood. Their mother died in a car accident and their father became an alcoholic after that point, alienating himself from the brothers. Margot reveals that Gordon drank a lot when they first met, but stopped after he accidentally broke her wrist during an argument, vowing to never drink again.

With two keys on the board, the brothers return to the basement to find Margot standing in front of the now-glowing gate, holding the third key. Bringing with them the dagger from Elric's store, they find themselves in a parallel dimension. Heading to the basement in this version of the house, they are attacked by ghouls of Hank and Derek. Hank wounds John before Gordon kills both ghouls. His father's ghoul now faces Gordon, and following Evelyn's instructions, he cuts out his father's heart, removing the key, and saving his father's soul. They rush upstairs to place the fourth key on the board, which restores them to their own dimension. Evelyn's last words to the brothers are to stop thinking about the dead, and to think about the living. The film ends with Margot and Gordon leaving, Gordon and John reconciling, and John staying to settle the estate.

Two cut scenes show Elric selling the game to a new customer and Evelyn staring at the audience.

== Cast ==
- Graham Skipper as Gordon Hardesty
- Chase Williamson as John Hardesty
- Brea Grant as Margot McKenzie
- Barbara Crampton as Evelyn
- Matt Mercer as Derek
- Justin Welborn as Hank
- Jesse Merlin as Elric
- Sara Malakul Lane as Dahlia
- Henry LeBlanc as Bob Hardesty
- Caryn Richman as Marilyn Hardesty

== Reception ==
On the review aggregator website Rotten Tomatoes, 86% of 21 critics' reviews are positive, with an average rating of 6.8/10. Metacritic, which uses a weighted average, assigned the film a score of 59 out of 100, based on 6 critics, indicating "mixed or average" reviews.

Noel Murray, writing for the Los Angeles Times, said "Anyone old enough to feel nostalgic for the era of VHS board games should get a kick out of “Beyond the Gates,” a horror movie as retro in style as subject matter." Justin Lowe for The Hollywood Reporter said "This low-budget horror-comedy co-starring Graham Skipper and Chase Williamson enthusiastically revisits familiar '90s genre conventions." Katie Rife of The A.V. Club gave the film a "B" rating calling it "an odd, sometimes uneasy combination of stylized retro horror and character drama that plays like a game of Exquisite Corpse between the Duplass brothers and Full Moon Pictures. It’s not intensely scary, but it is faithful to its ’80s influences, right on down to the deadbeat dad." Dennis Harvey, writing for Variety called it "a fun flashback to the era of cheesy direct-to-VHS horror." Kalyn Corrigan Bloody Disgusting said "overall, Beyond the Gates is a wickedly fun little trip down memory lane, back into the good ‘ol days of 1980s cult classics, like The Gate, From Beyond, and Re-Animator. Its light and playful atmosphere makes it not only one of the most enjoyable films to play at the Los Angeles Film Festival thus far, but also a film that clearly can be watched over and over again, specifically at home, on the couch with friends, a bowl of popcorn, and the lights dimmed."

Jake Dee, for JoBlo.com, gave the film a qualified endorsement noting "let's be honest, Beyond the Gates isn't a great movie. It's under-resourced, amateurishly acted and a bit slow-going in the beginning." Dee added, "For a low-budget indie horror flick, Beyond the Gates is certainly worth checking out, and definitely puts us on alert for what writer/director Jackson Stewart does next." Neil Genzlinger of The New York Times also had problems with the film saying it "shows early promise but eventually ends up in the bin of ordinariness."
