= Lucky (2020 film) =

2020 film by Natasha Kermani

- Film poster
- Directed by: Natasha Kermani
- Written by: Brea Grant
- Produced by: Patrick Ewald; Kimberly Hwang; Chelsea Davenport; Robert V. Galluzzo
- Starring: Brea Grant
- Cinematography: Julia Swain
- Edited by: Chris Willett
- Music by: Roman Chimienti
- Distributed by: Epic Pictures Group
- Release dates: August 23, 2020 (Fantasia Film Festival); March 4, 2021 (USA)
- Running time: 81 minutes; 83 minutes
- Country: United States
- Language: English

Lucky is a 2020 American horror film directed by Natasha Kermani and written by and starring Brea Grant. The film premiered at the Fantasia International Film Festival on August 23, 2020, and on Shudder on March 4, 2021.

== Synopsis ==
May Ryer, a self-help book author, is stalked by a mysterious masked man at her home in the middle of the night. She wakes her husband Ted who dismisses her. The next day Ted disregards her and leaves their house since he doesn't believe in the existence of the man.

The next few nights and days are marked by appearances of the man where she subdues or kills him but the body vanishes. She calls the police who send Officer Pace, who by turns patronizes or disregards her or suggests the unresponsive Ted is involved or is responsible.

Some of her relatives, friends and doctors also disbelieve her or tell her living with dangerous men is a part of life to be accepted and an everyday occurrence. May grows increasingly frustrated with the lack of help.

After a few days Ted returns and largely blames her for their relationship dissolving. The man suddenly appears and kills Ted and May battles him a final time. After she kills him she pulled his mask off and his face flickers between multiple men in her life, symbolizing the permanence of toxic masculinity.

== Cast ==
- Brea Grant as May Ryer
- Leith M. Burke as Rob
- Dhruv Uday Singh as Ted
- Hunter C. Smith as "The Man"

== Release ==
Lucky was originally slated to launch as part of the Midnighters program at the 2020 South by Southwest Film Festival, which was officially canceled due to the COVID-19 pandemic in Austin, Texas. The film premiered at the Fantasia International Film Festival on August 23, 2020. It premiered on Shudder on March 4, 2021, and it was released on VOD by RLJ Entertainment on August 3, 2021.

== Reception ==
=== Box office ===
Lucky grossed $2,045 with home video sales.

=== Critical response ===
On review aggregator Rotten Tomatoes, the film holds an approval rating of 93% based on 68 reviews, with an average score of 7.1/10. The website's critical consensus reads, "A rich blend of thrilling horror and sharp social commentary, Lucky acts like a bloody good calling card for director Natasha Kermani and writer-star Brea Grant." On Metacritic, the film holds a weighted average score of 75 out of 100 based on 7 critics, indicating "generally favorable" reviews.
