= Starry Eyes =

2014 American horror film

- Official poster
- Directed by: Kevin Kölsch; Dennis Widmyer
- Written by: Kevin Kölsch; Dennis Widmyer
- Produced by: Travis Stevens
- Starring: Alexandra Essoe; Amanda Fuller; Noah Segan
- Cinematography: Adam Bricker
- Edited by: Dennis Widmyer; Brody Gusar
- Music by: Jonathan Snipes
- Production companies: Snowfort Pictures; Parallactic Pictures; Dark Sky Films
- Release date: March 8, 2014 (SXSW)
- Running time: 98 minutes
- Country: United States
- Language: English

Starry Eyes is a 2014 American horror film written and directed by Kevin Kölsch and Dennis Widmyer. The film had its world premiere on March 8, 2014 at South by Southwest and features Alexandra Essoe as a hopeful young starlet who finds that fame's price is not always easily paid. Funding for the movie was partially raised through a successful Kickstarter campaign.

== Plot ==
Sarah Walker is an aspiring actress who is stuck waitressing at a fast-food restaurant. Her friends are generally unsupportive and selfish; Erin is constantly trying to steal Sarah's roles, while her roommate Tracy and aspiring director Danny are apathetic to Sarah's situation. Sarah's prospects at stardom look grim until she takes an audition for a film called The Silver Scream, held by the powerful production company Astraeus Pictures. Her audition is met with a lackluster response by the casting director and her assistant. Upset at being dismissed, Sarah goes to a nearby bathroom to scream and rip her hair out, a move that regains the interest of the casting director. She returns to the audition and reluctantly acquiesces to the casting director's demand that she rips her hair out again. Sarah is dismissed again, much to her confusion.

Sarah quits her job to fully pursue this role, and gets a callback for a second audition shortly after. She is caught off guard when she is told to disrobe. Sarah again agrees to these demands, and after being told to open herself up to the potential to "transform", she experiences extreme euphoria and undergoes a trance state, during which she notices that the casting director is wearing a pentagram-like necklace. While in this state, she begins to show mild erratic behaviors. However, when she is commanded to have sex with the producer at the third audition, Sarah balks and runs home. Danny, who apparently shows a romantic interest in Sarah, asks her to be the lead role in his own film project, to which she accepts.

At a pool party celebrating Danny's movie, Sarah is surprised when she sees him kissing Erin. Sarah angrily returns to the producer's house, where she promptly performs fellatio on him. During the following days, she shows increasingly erratic behavior even while her body begins to deteriorate. After a heated argument with Tracy, Sarah retreats to her room and sees the casting director, experiencing a vision of herself as a glamorous starlet. When she goes to the bathroom to vomit, she finds that her hair and nails have almost completely fallen out. Sarah, now wracked with pain, climbs into the bathtub and vomits masses of bloodied maggots.

Sarah answers a call from the producer, who tells her that she can either die or embrace the transformation. Sarah chooses the latter and goes to Erin's house to confront her. They argue over exchanging sex for film parts until Erin turns on the kitchen lights and sees Sarah's disfigured face. Erin tries to persuade Sarah to go to the hospital, but she slices Erin's cheek with a knife. Sarah accepts what she has done and proceeds to repeatedly stab Erin before killing two others in the house. She realizes that Erin is attempting to escape, and suffocates her with a plastic bag. She then goes outside to Danny's van and kills him as well.

Afterward, the people behind Astraeus Pictures reveal that they are a secret cult worshipping a demon of the same name. They conduct a ritual whereby Sarah, surrounded by illuminated acolytes, is reborn from a bloodied membrane as they mark out a surrounding pentagram-shaped emblem with rods of phosphorescent light. Sarah emerges with a flawless, healthy and totally hairless body; a gift-wrapped box has been left for her. She returns to her apartment and kills Tracy before putting on the presents that Astraeus left her: a black gown, a long brunette wig, and a silver pentagram necklace. Sarah admires herself in the mirror as her eyes glow green.

== Cast ==
- Alexandra Essoe as Sarah Walker
- Amanda Fuller as Tracy
- Noah Segan as Danny
- Fabianne Therese as Erin
- Shane Coffey as Poe
- Natalie Castillo as Ashley
- Pat Healy as Carl
- Nick Simmons as Ginko
- Maria Olsen as the Casting Director
- Marc Senter as the Assistant
- Louis Dezseran as the Producer
- Akchtonin Ramos as Mario The Chef

== Production ==
After writing the script, Widmyer and Kölsch sought funding for Starry Eyes through Kickstarter. The campaign attracted Pat Healy to the film, and the campaign ended with the goals met. Filming took place in Los Angeles in May 2013 over an 18-day period.

== Release ==
The film was released February 3, 2015 on DVD and Blu-ray Disc.

== Reception ==
The film holds an approval rating of 74% at Rotten Tomatoes, based on 23 reviews with an average rating of 7/10. The website's critical consensus reads, "Starry Eyes pokes Hollywood's seedy underbelly to produce a refreshingly original horror story led by a breakout performance from Alex Essoe." Metacritic gives the film a weighted average score of 49 out of 100, based on 6 critics, indicating "mixed or average reviews".

Simon Abrams of RogerEbert.com gave the film a score of 3/4 stars, writing that it "may leave you feeling hopeless, but its bleak vision of masochistic perfectionism is clear-eyed, cogent, and devastatingly unsettling." Richard Culpers of Variety praised Essoe's performance and wrote: "Though it’s a tad overcranked in the final furlong, the sheer energy on display and a devilishly compelling plot ultimately win the day."

In their review, Fangoria remarked that "[Directors and writers] Kolsch & Widmyer are clearly attuned to the pitch black nature that consumes Sarah but, like the alluring score, there's something stirring in her eventual transformation of living through an actor's worst cosmetic nightmare and still forcibly taking what she wants." Shock Till You Drop and Bloody Disgusting also praised the film, with Bloody Disgusting commenting that although the film did have flaws, "[those] same elements that provide its flaws also supply its strengths, which are far more prevalent." Time magazine called the film one of the ten best films of South by Southwest.

=== Awards ===
- Excellence in Poster Design at South by Southwest (2014, won)
- Directors’ Choice Award for Best Feature at the Boston Underground Film Festival (2014, won)
- BloodGuts UK Horror Award (2014, won special recognition)
- FANGORIA Chainsaw Award Best Actress (Alexandra Essoe)
