= Brea Grant =

American actress

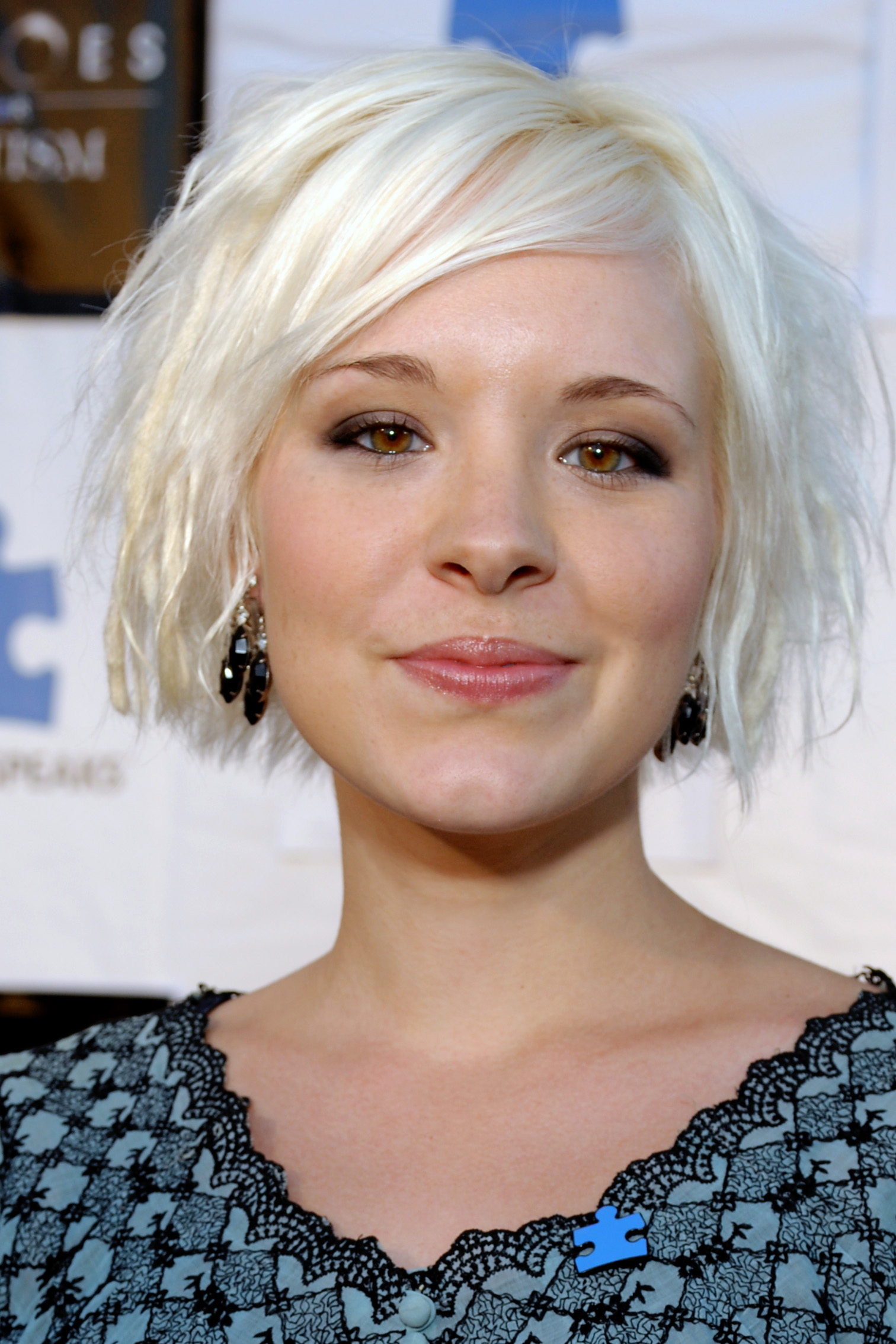
- Grant in 2009
- Born: Marshall, Texas, U.S.
- Education: University of Texas at Austin (BA, MA)
- Occupations: Actress, Author, Director, Screenwriter
- Years active: 2007–present

Brea Grant is an American actress, writer, and director. She played the character of Daphne Millbrook in the NBC television series Heroes.

== Early life ==
Brea Grant was born and raised in Marshall, Texas. She earned bachelor's and master's degrees in American studies from the University of Texas at Austin.

== Career ==
=== Acting ===
Grant's television acting career has included the roles of Jean Binnel on Friday Night Lights, Daphne Milbrook on Heroes, and Ryan Chambers on Dexter.

She played the supporting lead in the film Something Else, which premiered at Tribeca in 2019.

=== Writing, directing, and producing ===
Grant directed and co-wrote her first feature, an apocalyptic road trip movie called Best Friends Forever, in 2013. The movie premiered at the Slamdance Film Festival. She wrote and starred in the series The Real Housewives of Horror for Nerdist in 2014. She directed the short film Feminist Campfire Stories, which won the Audience Award at the Women in Comedy Film Festival.

Grant was nominated for a Daytime Emmy as a producer of the series EastSiders. She also acted in the show and wrote and directed an episode in Season 4.

Grant wrote and directed her second feature, 12 Hour Shift, in 2019. The dark heist film stars Angela Bettis, Chloe Farnworth, David Arquette, and Mick Foley.

Grant was a runner-up for the Audience Award for Overlook Film Festival's 2024 competition with the short film she directed and co-wrote, MLM.

=== Other media ===
Grant and author Mallory O'Meara began co-hosting the weekly podcast Reading Glasses in June 2017. The show is part of the Maximum Fun network and is focused on books and reading culture.

Grant created the comic book miniseries We Will Bury You with her brother Zane Grant and artist Kyle Strahm. She also wrote the SuicideGirls comic miniseries, based on the pin-up website of the same name.

In 2020, Six Foot Press published Mary, a graphic novel by Grant and artist Yishan Li. The title character is a fictional great-great-great-great-great-granddaughter of writer and Frankenstein creator Mary Shelley.

== Filmography ==
Year	Film	Role	Notes
2007	You're So Dead	Candy	
2008	Friday Night Lights	Jean Binnel	3 Episodes
2008	Smooch	Randi Spotswood	
2008	Multiple Choice	Barb	
2008	Cold Case	Liza West	1 Episode
2008	Corpse Run	Liberty	
2008	Middle of Nowhere	Jean	
2008	Raising the Bar	Heather Dreeban	1 Episode
2008	Midnight Movie	Rachael	
2008	Max Payne	Junkie Girl	uncredited
2008	Battle Planet	Rasha	
2008	Heroes	Daphne Millbrook	16 Episodes
2009	Trance	Chloe	
2009	Halloween II	Michaela "Mya" Rockwell	
2009	Valley Peaks	Lizabeth Hardchild	2 Episodes
2010	The Weathered Underground	Liz	Released on DVD
2011	Ice Road Terror	Rachel Harris	
2011	The Perfect Student	Jordan	
2011	Dexter	Ryan Chambers	4 Episodes
2011	Homecoming	Estelle	Post-production
2012	BlackBoxTV: Silverwood	Jennifer	YouTube series episode: Kidnapped
2012	Looper	TK Billboard Girl	Uncredited
2012	Game Shop	Chloe	IGN: Start YouTube Series
2012	NCIS: Los Angeles	Mia Jameson	Patriot Acts
2013	Detour	Laurie	
2013	Where Are My Dragons	Daenerys	A Funny or Die Exclusive
2013	Best Friends Forever	Harriet	Also directed by Grant
2013	Anger Management	Ellie	1 Episode
2013	Maron	Ivy	
2014	Doubles	Vera	Sci-fi short
2014	Smothered	DeeDee	
2014	Oliver, Stoned.	Megan	
2015	Alleluia! The Devil's Carnival	Click/The Rosy Bayonettes	
2015	Pitch Perfect 2	Barden University Orientation Announcer	
2016	Beyond the Gates	Margot McKenzie	
2017	A Ghost Story	Clara	
2018	Dead Night	Casey Pollack	
2018	Bad Apples	Ella	
2020	After Midnight	Abby	
2020	The Stylist	Olivia	
2020	Happily	Cashier	
2020	12 Hour Shift		Director
2020	Lucky	May Ryer	Screenwriter
2021	Madelines	Madeline	Co-Screenwriter (with Director Jason R Miller)
2022	Torn Hearts		Director
