= Sierra McCormick =

American actress (born 1997)

- Born: October 28, 1997 (age 29); Asheville, North Carolina, U.S.
- Occupation: Actress
- Years active: 2007–present

External image
- McCormick in 2019 (at IMDb)

Sierra McCormick (born October 28, 1997) is an American actress. She first became known for participating in the game show Are You Smarter Than a 5th Grader? (2007–2008) before making her acting debut with a role as Lilith on the television series Supernatural (2008). She also starred as Scout Thomas on the comedy television series Romantically Challenged (2010), played Alice in the direct-to-DVD film Spooky Buddies (2011) for which she won a Young Artist Award, and Susan Kushner in the comedy film Ramona and Beezus (2010). She had her breakthrough starring as Olive Doyle on the Disney Channel series A.N.T. Farm (2011–2014).

McCormick transitioned to more mature roles by starring as Moira in the horror indie film Some Kind of Hate (2015). She then earned critical acclaim for playing Fay Crocker in the science fiction film The Vast of Night (2019) and a nomination from the Critics' Choice Super Awards. She has since played Melissa in the horror film We Need to Do Something (2021), Scarlett Winslow in three episodes of the Hulu series American Horror Stories (2021), and Sybil in the thriller film The Last Stop in Yuma County (2023). Her latest role is Mary Sue in the straight-to-video action comedy Killing Mary Sue (2025).

== Early life ==
McCormick was born on October 28, 1997, in Asheville, North Carolina. She has a younger sister. She moved to Los Angeles, California, in 2006, after expressing an interest in acting. McCormick, like many child performers, attended Brighton Hall School in Burbank, California.

== Career ==
=== 2007–2014: Child acting and breakthrough ===
McCormick first began acting in 2007 at the age of nine, making an uncredited cameo on the television series 'Til Death. In 2007, she was cast in the second season of the game show Are You Smarter Than a 5th Grader? as one of the students. Following a guest appearance on the Disney Channel series Hannah Montana in 2008, she co-starred with China Anne McClain in the film Jack and Janet Save the Planet, an unaired pilot. In the same year, she appeared as Lilith on two episodes of the fantasy television series Supernatural. In 2010, McCormick starred in the comedy film Ramona and Beezus as Susan Kushner, the rival of the title character, Ramona Quimby. The film was received positively, with the acting ensemble being praised for their performances. In the same year, she was cast as Scout Thomas, the daughter of Rebecca Thomas, in the comedy television series Romantically Challenged, which was cancelled after a season.

In 2011, she appeared in the television film A Nanny for Christmas. In the same year, she voiced Alice in the Disney direct-to-video film Spooky Buddies. McCormick, along with the cast of the film, won a Young Artist Award for their performances. Also in 2011, McCormick had her breakthrough when she was cast in the role of Olive Doyle, a girl with an eidetic memory, in the Disney Channel series A.N.T. Farm. She was chosen after an audition where she continuously spoke about tigers. Dan Signer stated: "And as I heard her continually talking about tigers, I thought, 'That's just how Olive would sound.' Which is how Sierra got that part." According to an interview with McCormick, getting the role was easy because she and McClain were already friends from their previous work experience. The show ran for three seasons, ending in 2014. From 2011 to 2014, McCormick had a recurring role on the Disney Channel sitcom Jessie as Connie, a girl obsessed with one of the main characters, Luke.

=== 2015–present: Transition to mainstream roles ===
In 2015, McCormick starred in the horror film Some Kind of Hate as Moira. She had been hired by director Adam Egypt Mortimer to appeal to her then younger fanbase, stating that the film would be "the first intense horror movie experience that some of these kids will ever have". Although the film received mixed reviews, McCormick's performance, along with the rest of her cast members was received positively, with Bloody Disgusting writing "The acting is largely well done, and the script by Mortimer and DeLeeuw definitely attempt to give the characters more dimension than what you'd normally expect from a film like this." McCormick earned a Fright Meter Award nomination for the role.

From 2016 to 2018, McCormick worked in a series of short films and television films; these include her roles as Sarah in the 2016 Lifetime television film Sorority Nightmare, and as Kara Gentry in the 2017 film Christmas in the Heartland, which was originally made for television, but was later released direct-to-video.

In 2019, McCormick co-starred with Jake Horowitz in the science fiction film The Vast of Night, based on the Kecksburg UFO incident and the Foss Lake Disappearances. She starred as Fay Crocker, a young switchboard operator in high school in the fictional town of Cayuga, New Mexico. McCormick said that she was convinced to play the role after reading the script, where she then met with the film's director Andrew Patterson and auditioned. To prepare for the role, she had to learn how to use a switchboard, which she practiced in her hotel room. The film and McCormick's performance were acclaimed, with critics particularly praising her consistency in long single takes. Paste included her among the "10 Breakout Film Performances of the Year", additionally writing that "Sierra McCormick does some work in The Vast of Night that's competitive with the best acting of the year." Salon also listed her performance as one of "6 great film performances missed in 2020", comparing her to a "young Sissy Spacek." For her role, she received a special mention from the Jury Awards at the Hamptons International Film Festival, as well as a nomination for Best Actress in a Science Fiction/Fantasy Movie at the Critics' Choice Super Awards. She next appeared in the 2019 horror film VFW, where she portrayed Lizard. She commented on her experience with the role, stating "I was really excited to do something different. People got to see me being really crass and bloody and kicking some ass..." She also starred in the Lifetime television film Who Stole My Daughter? as Katie Sullivan, the eponymous daughter of Samaire Armstrong's character.

In October 2020, it was announced McCormick would star alongside Vinessa Shaw in the upcoming thriller film We Need to Do Something; she was cast as Melissa, who is part of a family trapped in their bathroom during a tornado. She stated that "I felt really antsy being cooped up in my apartment, and I'm sure everyone can relate to that feeling ... when I read the script, I was struck by the nihilistic tone the movie takes, and I'm a big fan of that." The film was theatrically released in September 2021, and earned generally positive reviews from critics. McCormick's performance was lauded, with Chicago Reader describing her as "captivating". IGN wrote that "Sierra McCormick brings wide eyes and a sulking snarl to teen daughter Melissa, whose internal drama is signaled by a goth wardrobe topped by a bubblegum pink wig." From July to August 2021, McCormick appeared in three episodes of American Horror Stories on FX on Hulu. Her role as Scarlett was praised; CBR described her as having a "captivating screen presence", and went on to state that she made "a strong debut ... it'd be seriously surprising if she doesn't eventually get cast in some of Murphy's other projects. She's set to be a star."

In 2023, McCormick starred as Sybil in the acclaimed crime thriller film The Last Stop in Yuma County, directed by Francis Gallupi. She will next headline the coming-of-age drama film Sour Milk.

== Filmography ==
=== Film ===
Year	Title	Role	Notes
2009	Land of the Lost	Tar Pits Kid	
2010	Ramona and Beezus	Susan Kushner	
2010	A Nanny for Christmas	Jackie Ryland	
2011	Spooky Buddies	Alice	
2015	Some Kind of Hate	Moira	
2018	The Honor List	Charlotte	
2018	The Neighborhood Watch	Allie	
2018	Pretty Little Stalker	Bridget	
2019	The Vast of Night	Fay Crocker	
2019	VFW	Lizard	
2021	We Need to Do Something	Melissa	
2023	The Last Stop in Yuma County	Sybil	
2024	Camp	Lily	
2025	Killing Mary Sue	Mary Sue Harper	Video on demand

=== Television ===
Year	Title	Role	Notes
2007	'Til Death	Kid	Episode: "Summer of Love"
2007–2008	Are You Smarter Than a 5th Grader?	Herself	5th grade classmate (season 2)
2007–2009	Curb Your Enthusiasm	Emma	Episodes: "The Bat Mitzvah", "The Reunion", "The Table Read"
2008	Boston Legal	Daniella	Episode: "Dances with Wolves"
2008	Supernatural	Lilith	Episodes: "No Rest for the Wicked", "Yellow Fever"
2009	Jack and Janet Save the Planet	Molly	Unsold TV pilot
2009	Criminal Minds	Lynn Robillard	Episode: "Bloodline"
2009	Hannah Montana	Gillian	Episode: "Welcome to the Bungle"
2009	Monk	Anne Marie	Episode: "Mr. Monk and the Dog"
2009	The Dog Who Saved Christmas	Kara Bannister	Television film
2010	Medium	Allison (Young)	Episode: "There Will Be Blood... Type A"
2010	CSI: Crime Scene Investigation	Gracie Layman	Episode: "Irradiator"
2010	Romantically Challenged	Scout Thomas	Main role
2011–2014	A.N.T. Farm	Olive Doyle	Main role
2011–2014	Jessie	Connie	3 episodes
2013	The Breakdown	Little Girl	Television film
2016	Sorority Nightmare	Sarah	Television film; originally titled Twisted Sisters
2017	Christmas in the Heartland	Kara Gentry	Television film
2019	Who Stole My Daughter?	Katie Sullivan	Television film
2021	American Horror Stories	Scarlett Winslow	3 episodes

=== Music videos ===
- "Dynamite" (2011), by China Anne McClain

== Awards and nominations ==
Year	Award	Category	Work	Result	Ref
2012	Young Artist Awards	Best Performance in a DVD Film – Young Ensemble Cast	Spooky Buddies	Won	
2015	Fright Meter Awards	Best Supporting Actress	Some Kind of Hate	Nominated	
2019	Hamptons International Film Festival	Jury Awards	The Vast of Night	Special Mention	
2021	Critics' Choice Super Awards	Best Actress in a Science Fiction/Fantasy Movie	The Vast of Night	Nominated	

Preceded by Jacob Hays (Season 1)	Are You Smarter than a 5th Grader? Member of the Class; Occupant of Seat #3; Season 2 (2007–2008)	Succeeded by Olivia Dellums (Season 3)
