= VFW (film) =

2019 American horror film

- Film poster
- Directed by: Joe Begos
- Written by: Max Brallier; Matthew McArdle
- Produced by: Josh Ethier; Amanda Presmyk; Dallas Sonnier
- Starring: Stephen Lang; William Sadler; Martin Kove; Fred Williamson
- Cinematography: Mike Testin
- Edited by: Josh Ethier
- Music by: Steve Moore
- Production companies: Fangoria; Channel 83 Films; Media Finance Capital; Good Wizard; Voltage Pictures; Zero Trans Fat Productions
- Distributed by: RLJE Films
- Release dates: September 21, 2019 (Fantastic Fest); February 14, 2020 (United States)
- Running time: 92 minutes
- Country: United States
- Language: English

VFW is a 2019 American action splatter film directed by Joe Begos and starring Stephen Lang, William Sadler, Martin Kove and Fred Williamson. The film premiered at the 2019 Fantastic Fest in Austin, Texas, and released to theaters, VOD, and Digital HD on February 14, 2020.

== Plot ==
Boz, the leader of a psychotic gang, deals a powerful and addictive new drug called Hype. His members, dubbed Hypers, are completely hooked on his product so much he makes one of the members, Lucy, jump off a balcony to her death when he drops a vial of Hype off it. Lucy's younger sister Elizabeth, nicknamed Lizard, witnesses this and steals Boz's stash while fleeing from Boz when he catches her in the act.

Elsewhere Fred Parras, an Army Veteran from the Vietnam War, meets up with his friend Abe Hawkins. They go to Fred's bar, a V.F.W. (Veterans of Foreign Wars) hangout, where they meet up with their old army friends Walter Reed, Lou Clayton, Thomas "Z" Zabriski, and Doug McCarthy. The friends wish to celebrate Fred's birthday, much to his chagrin, and relive their glory days. Later, young Army Ranger Shaun Mason, who is on leave to see his wife, joins them. The night turns chaotic when Lizard enters the bar, and Boz's brother Roadie hacks off one of Doug's arms with an ax.

Fred and the Veterans fight off Roadie and his men, with Fred killing Roadie with his sawed-off shotgun. Wanting to get Doug medical help, Z and Fred try to flee to Z's truck, only for Boz's right-hand woman, Gutter, to slice open Z's neck with her machete. Fred and Walter attempt the truck again, but Gutter sneaks up on Fred and begins strangling him with a chain demanding him to “give it back!” Fred survives by stabbing Gutter with the truck keys and returns to his bar. He demands Lizard tell the truth about her and the attacks, but she remains silent.

Lou later finds out why they are being attacked after finding the backpack with the stolen stash in a toilet tank and wishes to make a deal with Boz. Lizard, however, says that because they killed Roadie, Boz will never let them live, and the only option the Veterans have is to defend themselves against the Hypers. They prepare makeshift weapons from the bar’s furniture and traps reminiscent of those used in the Vietnam War. The Veterans are put through Hell when Boz's Hypers, including the hulking member Tank, break into the barricaded bar giving them a bloody battle. Having reached his breaking point, Lou decides to make a deal with Boz to save himself and his friends. Boz does not comply and decides to shoot and kill Lou, but not before Lou takes out more of Boz's men.

Fred, who chased after Lou, is shot in the leg by Boz and becomes depressed after Lou's death and Doug finally dying after the blood loss from his wounds. He starts drinking in the back room from the guilt till Lizard snaps him out of it, reminding him how his remaining friends need him, including her. Fred and the Veterans decide to make a last stand against Boz, who has had enough of the Veterans killing his men and running out of time with dawn approaching. The Hypers blow up the barricade and demand the product back, giving Fred a no way out ultimatum, but Fred refuses to give up after everything they put him and the others through and shoots one of the bricks of Hype in the air causing Boz's Hypers who inhaled the drug to go crazy and attack everyone including him and Gutter.

The Veterans begin fighting back. Abe, who has taken a hit of Hype to prepare mentally, begins slicing up the Hypers with his old service machete to allow the others to flee. Walter steals a chainsaw, and with Shaun's help, they get to the Vet's old Gun Truck to escape but are ambushed with Walter taking a mortal wound to his shoulder.

Abe battles Gutter, who gets the upper hand wounding him but dies when Fred rams a broken flag pole through her body and the other piece through her head. Lizard was caught by Boz earlier during the fight and forces her back to his car, but Fred retrieves his shotgun and remaining ammo and shoots Boz in the back as well as the backpack, which he had earlier soaked with his alcohol, catching it on fire allowing Lizard to escape. Walter, who is barely hanging on, orders Shaun to leave him so he can see his wife again, with Walter ramming the Gun Truck at Boz, causing both the Gun Truck and Boz's escape vehicle to explode, killing them both.

Fred, Shaun, and Lizard return to the bar with an exhausted Abe waiting, where they pour shots for their fallen friends, including Abe, who succumbs to his injuries after receiving his shot glass. Fred finds a block of Hype hiding behind his counter with Lizard commenting the money he will get with it will repair the bar and more realizing Lizard hid it there on purpose to thank Fred for everything he did for her. The three then consume their drinks, with Shaun telling Fred happy birthday.

== Cast ==
- Stephen Lang as Fred Parras
- William Sadler as Walter Reed
- Fred Williamson as Abe Hawkins
- Martin Kove as Lou Clayton
- David Patrick Kelly as Doug McCarthy
- Sierra McCormick as Lizard
- Tom Williamson as Shaun Mason
- Travis Hammer as Boz
- Dora Madison as Gutter
- George Wendt as Thomas Zabriski
- Graham Skipper as Roadie

== Production ==
Joe Begos, director of Almost Human and The Mind's Eye, was given a script written by Max Brallier and Matthew McArdle entitled VFW by Dallas Sonnier of Cinestate and Fangoria. Begos was attracted to project for it being "the type of white-knuckle stuff that I like to do". In February 2019, Begos officially signed on to direct the film. In March, Stephen Lang joined the cast as the lead, while Sonnier and Amanda Presmyk were set to produce along with Begos' collaborator Josh Ethier. Along with acting as director, Begos also rewrote the script and served as camera operator, while Ethier performed as sound designer and editor.

Filming took place on location in March 2019 in Dallas, Texas at a real VFW, lasting four weeks. While shooting the film, Begos simultaneously did post-production work on Bliss.

In June 2020, three crew members alleged to The Daily Beast that during a wardrobe fitting, actor Fred Williamson tried to grope an assistant costume designer. Williamson remained on the project. Later in production, a member of the hair and makeup department quit the film due to allegedly receiving a "barrage of sexual overtures" from the actor. Williamson denied the allegations. Sonnier denies being told that anyone saw Williamson grope the crew member, while Presmyk claims she remembered the incident as more “lighthearted in nature".

== Reception ==
VFW holds an 83% rating on review aggregator Rotten Tomatoes, based on 53 reviews with an average rating of 6.9/10. The critic consensus reads "VFW's solid cast, deft direction, and surprisingly weighty subtext add extra heft to a gory horror that should hold buckets of sanguine appeal for grindhouse fans." Metacritic, which uses a weighted average, gave the film a score of 72 out of 100, based on ten critics, indicating "generally favorable" reviews. Andy Crump of Paste gave it a rating of 6.9. Chuck Foster of Film Threat gave it a 10 out of 10. Meagan Navarro of Bloody Disgusting awarded the film three skulls out of five. Katie Rife of The A.V. Club graded the film a B.
