= Stanley Film Festival =

Film festival in Colorado, United States

Stanley Film Festival was a horror film festival located in Estes Park, Colorado. Founded in 2013, the festival showcased independent horror films, including features, shorts and special events with guest filmmakers. The festival was named for the Stanley Hotel in Estes Park where it is held, a neo-Georgian hotel that was the inspiration and setting of Stephen King's horror novel The Shining. The festival also held a student film competition titled, The Stanley Dean's Cup.

== 2013 Festival ==
The inaugural festival was held May 2–5, 2013. Opening night film: The Purge with director James DeMonaco and producer Jason Blum in attendance. The 2013 festival was curated by Programming Director Landon Zakheim and programmer Michael Lerman, with films from 13 different countries.

=== Selected films ===
Film	Director	Country	Additional Notes
100 Bloody Acres	Colin and Cameron Cairnes	Australia	
Aftershock	Nicolás López	USA, Chile	Closing Night
All the Boys Love Mandy Lane	Jonathan Levine	USA	
Beneath	Larry Fessenden	USA	
Berberian Sound Studio	Peter Strickland	United Kingdom	
Big Bad Wolves	Navot Papushado & Aharon Keshales	Israel	
Black Rock	Katie Aselton	USA	
Cabin Fever – Unrated Director's Cut	Eli Roth	USA	
Frankenstein's Army	Richard Raaphorst	Netherlands	
Here Comes the Devil	Adrián García Bogliano	Mexico	
Macabre	Kimo Stamboel & Timo Tjahjanto	Singapore, Indonesia	
Maniac	Frank Khalfoun	USA	
No One Lives	Ryûhei Kitamura	USA	
Room 237	Rodney Ascher	USA	
Sightseers	Ben Wheatley	United Kingdom	Centerpiece
The Cabinet of Dr. Caligari	Robert Wiene	Germany	
The Purge	James DeMonaco	USA	Opening Night
The Rambler	Calvin Lee Reeder	USA	
The Shining	Stanley Kubrick	USA	
Tower Block	James Nunn & Ronnie Thompson	United Kingdom	
V/H/S/2	Simon Barrett, Jason Eisener, Gareth Evans, Gregg Hale, Eduardo Sánchez, Timo Tjahjanto & Adam Wingard	USA, Canada, Indonesia	
Vanishing Waves	Kristina Buozyte	Lithuania, France, Belgium	
Wither	Sonny Laguna & Tommy Wiklund	Sweden	

=== Special Events ===
- "Secrets of The Shining" panel discussion about Stanley Kubrick's The Shining, which complimented a screening of Room 237.

It included Room 237 director Rodney Ascher and subject Jay Weidner, Leon Vitali, who was Kubrick's personal assistant on The Shining,
Mick Garris, director of The Shining (TV miniseries), and moderated by Badass Digest writer Devin Faraci.

- Presentation of The Cabinet of Dr. Caligari with live piano score by performer Hank Troy.
- "Composing for Genre Cinema" - a panel discussion with film score composers, Nathan Barr, Jonathan Snipes, William Hutson, Hank Troy and Mark Schulz.
- Live performance by the John Chaos Sideshow.

=== 2013 Awards ===
Award	Recipient	Film/Note
Visionary Award	Eli Roth	Example
Audience Award for Feature	Franck Khalfoun	Maniac
Audience Award for Short	Ryan Spindell	The Root of the Problem
Stanley Dean’s Cup	John McSween	Peak of Terror

== 2014 Festival ==
The 2nd annual festival took place April 24–27, 2014.

=== Selected films ===
Film	Director	Country	Additional Notes
Doc of the Dead	Alexandre O. Philippe	USA	Opening Night
What We Do in the Shadows	Taika Waititi and Jemaine Clement	New Zealand	Closing Night
The Babadook	Jennifer Kent	Australia	
Blood Glacier	Marvin Kren	Austria	
Dead Snow: Red vs. Dead	Tommy Wirkola	Norway/Iceland	
Eyes Wide Shut	Stanley Kubrick	UK/USA	
The Fall of the House of Usher	Jean Epstein	France/USA	
Gremlins	Joe Dante	USA	
Housebound	Gerard Johnstone	New Zealand	
Late Phases	Adrian Garcia Bogliano	USA	
Lesson of the Evil	Takashi Miike	Japan	
LFO	Antonio Tublen	Sweden/Denmark	
Moebius	Kim Ki-duk	South Korea	
The Nightmare Before Christmas	Henry Selick	USA	
Nothing Bad Can Happen	Katrin Gebbe	Germany	
Open Windows	Nacho Vigolando	Spain/USA	
Ragnarok	Mikkel Brænne Sandemose	Norway	
R100	Hitoshi Matsumoto	Japan	
Rigor Mortis	Juno Mak	Hong Kong	
The Sacrament	Ti West	USA	
Sleepwalkers	Mick Garris	USA	
Starry Eyes	Kevin Kölsch and Dennis Widmyer	USA	
The Strange Color of Your Body's Tears	Hélène Cattet and Bruno Forzani	Belgium / France / Luxembourg	
The Texas Chain Saw Massacre – 40th ANNIVERSARY RESTORATION	Tobe Hooper	USA	
Witching and Bitching	Alex de la Iglesia	Spain	
Who Can Kill a Child?	Narciso Ibáñez Serrador	Spain	

=== 2014 Awards ===
Award	Recipient	Film/Note
Visionary Award	Elijah Wood; Daniel Noah; Josh Waller	Founders of SpectreVision
The Master of Horror Award	Joe Dante	
Audience Award for Feature	What We Do In The Shadows	
Audience Award for Short	Here Be Monsters	
Jury Award for Short	Ghost Train	
Stanley Dean's Cup Jury Award and Stanley Dean's Cup Audience Award	Wormbug	

== 2015 Festival ==
The 3rd annual festival took place April 30 - May 3, 2015.

Opening night film: Cooties with SpectreVision production company partners Daniel Noah, Josh Waller, and Elijah Wood in attendance.

=== Selected films ===
Film	Director	Country	Notes
The Nightmare	Rodney Ascher	USA	
We Are Still Here	Ted Geoghegan	USA	
Body	Dan Berk & Robert Olsen	USA	
The Boy	Craig Macneill	USA	
Deathgasm	Jason Lei Howden	New Zealand	
Director's Commentary: The Terror Of Frankenstein	Tim Kirk	USA	
The Final Girls	Todd Strauss-Schulson	USA	Closing Night
Cooties	Jonathan Milott & Cary Murnion	USA	Opening Night
Goodnight Mommy; Ich Seh Ich Seh	Severin Fiala & Veronika Franz	Austria	
The Hallow	Corin Hardy	United Kingdom	
Hollow	Ham Tran	Vietnam	
The Invitation	Karyn Kusama	USA	Centerpiece
Let Us Prey	Brian O'Malley	United Kingdom	
Over Your Dead Body; Kuime	Takashi Miike	Japan	
Scherzo Diabolico	Adrian Garcia Bogliano	Mexico	
Shrew's Nest; Musarañas	Juanfer Andrés & Esteban Roel	Spain	
Some Kind Of Hate	Adam Egypt Mortimer	USA	
Stung	TBenni Diez	USA	
Sun Choke	Ben Cresciman	USA	
The Treatment	Hans Herbots	Belgium	
When Animals Dream; Når Dyrene Drømmer	Jonas Alexander Arnby	Denmark	
Shivers	David Cronenberg	Canada	Retrospective
Re-Animator	Stuart Gordon	USA	Retrospective
The Bride Of Frankenstein	James Whale	USA	Retrospective
Diabolique; Les Diaboliques	Henri-Georges Clouzot	France	Retrospective
Repulsion	Roman Polanski	United Kingdom	Retrospective
The Rocky Horror Picture Show	Jim Sharman	USA	Retrospective

=== 2015 Awards ===
Award	Recipient	Film/Note
Visionary Award	Tom Quinn	RADiUS-TWC co-president
Audience Award for Feature	The Final Girls	Director Todd Strauss-Schulson
Audience Award & Jury Award for Short Film	The Babysitter Murder	Director Ryan Spindell
Stanley Dean's Cup Colorado Prize	Moon Studios	Director Merritt Crocker
Stanley Dean's Cup International Prize	Inherent Noise	Director Karol Jurga
