= RLJ Entertainment =

American home video and film distributor

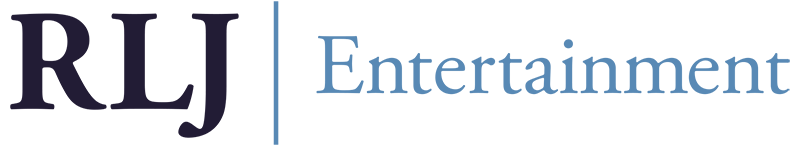
- Formerly: Image Entertainment (1981–2012)
- Type: Subsidiary
- Traded as: Nasdaq: DISK
- Industry: Entertainment
- Founded: 1981; 45 years ago
- Founder: Robert L. Johnson
- Headquarters: Chatsworth, Los Angeles, California, United States
- Key people: Miguel Penella (CEO); Drew Wilson (CFO); Bill Bromiley (CAO)
- Products: DVD; Blu-ray; digital video; CD; Digital audio; Motion picture studio
- Owner: AMC Global Media (83%); RLJ Companies (17%)
- Subsidiaries: Acorn DVD; Acorn TV; Agatha Christie Ltd (64%)
- Website: rljentertainment.com

RLJ Entertainment (formerly Image Entertainment) is an American film production company and home video distributor headquartered in Chatsworth, California. It is majority owned by AMC Global Media.

The company's catalog includes approximately 3,200 exclusive DVD titles, and approximately 340 exclusive CD titles in domestic release, and approximately 450 programs internationally via sublicense agreements. For many of its titles, Image had exclusive audio and broadcast rights as well as digital download rights to approximately 2,100 video programs and over 400 audio programs containing more than 6,000 tracks.

== History ==
=== As Image Entertainment ===
Image's final logo (2009–2015)

Founded in 1981, Image Entertainment began as a distributor of LaserDiscs, whose sound and picture quality surpassed that of VHS and Beta, the dominant tape formats of the time. In its earlier years, the company originally distributed X-rated titles in addition to mainstream titles. Image successfully secured exclusive output deals with major studios such as Universal, Fox, Orion, and Disney, and grew to become the dominant distributor of the format. The company traded on the Nasdaq stock exchange under the symbol "DISK".

In August 1994, Image entered the CD-ROM market, releasing movies on the CD-ROM format.

As the 1990s came to a close and Laserdiscs gave way to DVDs, Image re-focused on the fledgling format that quickly came to dominate the home video marketplace. While studios were busy managing the transition from VHS to DVD, Image began to acquire DVD rights to long-form music concert programs, television programming, foreign films and a broad array of special interest programming from GRB Entertainment, 20th Television/Foxstar Productions, Orion Pictures, Playboy Home Entertainment and Universal Pictures, all of which were being ignored by the major studios and music labels.

In 2005, Image signed a distribution deal with Bandai Visual to distribute select anime titles under the Honneamise label. The deal ended in March 2007, when Bandai Visual switched over to Geneon USA.

Image continued to work with its long-term partner, Criterion Collection, as well as hundreds of independent content producers and rights holders to bring products to the marketplace. In 2008, Image began to expand its release schedule to include feature films.

On August 31, 2010, Sony Pictures Home Entertainment partnered with Image Entertainment in a multi-year agreement, marketing and distributing some DVDs and Blu-rays by Image. Image retains its own sales and marketing. The deal was expired in April 2012, when Mill Creek Entertainment agreed to release the most of Sony Pictures libraries. On April 27, 2011, Image Entertainment made a long-term agreement with Lakeshore Entertainment to distribute their film library on home media. This also gave them access to the New World Pictures library which Lakeshore acquired in 1996, with many of the titles not issued on Blu-ray at the time.

=== Acquisition and merger with RLJ ===
On April 2, 2012, it was announced that RLJ Acquisition, Inc. had entered into an agreement to acquire Image Entertainment, as well as Acorn Media, and planned to merge the two companies. The two companies operate under the banner RLJ Entertainment. The company was then renamed RLJ Entertainment. In 2014, RLJ acquired British media distributor Acorn Media UK, this deal also included 64% in Agatha Christie Limited.

On July 30, 2018, AMC Networks reached a definitive agreement to acquire RLJ Entertainment where AMC would pay $59 million for the remaining RLJE shares not owned by AMC or Robert L. Johnson. The transaction was approved by RLJ Entertainment's stockholders on October 31, and AMC Networks completed the acquisition on November 1. RLJ Entertainment became a privately owned subsidiary of AMC Networks, with Johnson and his affiliates owning a 17% stake.

== Selected releases ==
=== Feature films ===
==== 2010s ====
Title	Release date
Every Day	January 14, 2011
The Way Back	January 21, 2011
Passion Play	May 6, 2011
The Double	October 28, 2011
Beneath the Darkness	January 6, 2012
Lovely Molly	May 18, 2012
Home Run Showdown	July 27, 2012
Goats	August 10, 2012
The Tall Man	August 31, 2012
Barrymore	November 14, 2012
Day of the Falcon	March 1, 2013
Tomorrow You're Gone	April 5, 2013
The Numbers Station	April 26, 2013
Evidence	July 19, 2013
Stranded	July 26, 2013
Blood	August 9, 2013
Winnie Mandela	September 6, 2013
The Colony	September 20, 2013
Paradise	October 18, 2013
Last Love	November 1, 2013
Black Coffee	January 10, 2014
The Suspect	January 10, 2014
The Outsider	February 7, 2014
Odd Thomas	February 28, 2014
Sparks	March 7, 2014
Devil's Knot	May 9, 2014
Wolf Creek 2	May 16, 2014
All Cheerleaders Die	June 13, 2014
Rage	July 11, 2014
Aftermath	July 18, 2014
Cabin Fever: Patient Zero	August 1, 2014
Drive Hard	October 3, 2014
The Houses October Built	October 10, 2014
The Rewrite	February 13, 2015
Digging Up the Marrow	February 20, 2015
The Cobbler	March 13, 2015
Blackbird	April 24, 2015
Burying the Ex	June 19, 2015
Dark Was the Night	July 24, 2015
Return to Sender	August 14, 2015
Some Kind of Hate	September 18, 2015
Pay the Ghost	September 25, 2015
A Christmas Horror Story	October 2, 2015
Bone Tomahawk	October 23, 2015
Condemned	November 13, 2015
Criminal Activities	November 20, 2015
Nina	April 22, 2016
The Phenom	June 24, 2016
The Mind's Eye	August 5, 2016
Kickboxer: Vengeance	September 2, 2016
I.T.	September 23, 2016
Dog Eat Dog	November 4, 2016
Knucklehead	December 6, 2016
Once Upon a Time in Venice	June 16, 2017
Pilgrimage	August 11, 2017
Ruin Me	August 27, 2017
Bushwick	August 25, 2017
The Limehouse Golem	September 8, 2017
The Houses October Built 2	September 22, 2017
Brawl in Cell Block 99	October 6, 2017
The Osiris Child	October 6, 2017
Mayhem	November 10, 2017
Another WolfCop	December 1, 2017
I Kill Giants	March 23, 2018
Terminal	May 11, 2018
Puppet Master: The Littlest Reich	August 17, 2018
Arizona	August 24, 2018
Mandy	September 14, 2018
Beyond the Sky	September 21, 2018
Ride	October 5, 2018
Galveston	October 19, 2018
Monster Party	November 2, 2018
The Standoff at Sparrow Creek	January 18, 2019
The Man Who Killed Hitler and Then the Bigfoot	February 8, 2019
Plus One	June 14, 2019
Into the Ashes	July 19, 2019
A Score to Settle	August 2, 2019
Gwen	August 16, 2019
Satanic Panic	September 6, 2019
Mary	October 11, 2019
Trick	October 18, 2019
Adopt a Highway	November 1, 2019
The Shed	November 15, 2019

==== 2020s ====
Title	Release date
Color Out of Space	January 24, 2020
VFW	February 14, 2020
The Postcard Killings	March 13, 2020
You Don't Nomi	June 9, 2020
The Tax Collector	August 7, 2020
Spree	August 14, 2020
The Pale Door	August 21, 2020
The Owners	September 4, 2020
The Superdeep	September 4, 2020
2067	October 2, 2020
The Opening Act	October 16, 2020
The Dark and the Wicked	November 6, 2020
Always and Forever	November 20, 2020
Castle Freak	December 4, 2020
Archenemy	December 11, 2020
PG: Psycho Goreman	January 22, 2021
The Reckoning	February 5, 2021
Son	March 5, 2021
Shoplifters of the World	March 26, 2021
The Water Man	May 7, 2021
Seance	May 21, 2021
Great White	July 16, 2021
No Man of God	August 27, 2021
Prisoners of the Ghostland	September 17, 2021
South of Heaven	October 8, 2021
The Spine of Night	October 29, 2021
Apex	November 12, 2021
Silent Night	December 3, 2021
Last Looks	February 4, 2022
Creation Stories	February 25, 2022
Offseason	March 11, 2022
Dual	April 15, 2022
The Cellar	April 15, 2022
The Twin	May 6, 2022
White Elephant	June 3, 2022
Murder At Yellowstone City	June 24, 2022
The Reef: Stalked	July 29, 2022
Allegoria	August 1, 2022
Section Eight	September 23, 2022
Old Man	October 14, 2022
Slash/Back	October 21, 2022
The Lair	October 28, 2022
Nocebo	November 4, 2022
The Friendship Game	November 11, 2022
Taurus	November 18, 2022
Christmas with the Campbells	December 2, 2022
Christmas Bloody Christmas	December 9, 2022
The Apology	December 16, 2022
Kids vs. Aliens	January 20, 2023
Sympathy for the Devil	July 28, 2023
The Dive	August 25, 2023
Suitable Flesh	October 27, 2023
It's a Wonderful Knife	November 10, 2023
No Way Up	February 16, 2024 (USA/Canada/International distribution only through Warner Bros. Pictures)
Arcadian	April 12, 2024
The Last Breath	July 26, 2024
Little Bites	October 4, 2024
Levels	November 1, 2024 (US only)
Bloody Axe Wound	December 27, 2024
Ash	March 21, 2025
Neighborhood Watch	April 25, 2025
Clown in a Cornfield	May 9, 2025
Descendent	August 8, 2025
Muzzle: City of Wolves	November 14, 2025
Night Patrol	January 16, 2026

=== Other releases ===
- The Air I Breathe
- Arizona
- Autumn Hearts
- Before the Devil Knows You're Dead
- Chillerama
- Beneath the Darkness
- Born to Ride
- The Boys Club
- Color of Freedom
- The Colony
- The Commitments
- Devil's Knot
- The Distance
- Dreamscape
- Ernest movies:
  - Ernest Goes to Africa (part of Ernest's Wacky Adventures: Volume 2, Ernest Triple Feature, and "Ultimate Ernest Collection")
  - Ernest Goes to School (part of Ernest's Wacky Adventures: Volume 2 and Ernest Triple Feature)
  - Ernest in the Army (part of Ernest's Wacky Adventures: Volume 1, Ernest Triple Feature, and "Ultimate Ernest Collection")
  - Ernest Rides Again (part of Ernest's Wacky Adventures: Volume 1)
  - Slam Dunk Ernest (part of Ernest's Wacky Adventures: Volume 2)
  - Knowhutimean? Hey Vern, It's My Family Album (part of Ernest's Wacky Adventures: Volume 2 and Ultimate Ernest Collection)
  - Your World As I See It (part of Ultimate Ernest Collection)
- Far North
- Five Dollars a Day
- Freeway Killer
- Hate Crime
- Home Sweet Home
- The Incredible Hulk Returns (paired with The Trial of the Incredible Hulk)
- Intimate Stranger
- Joan of Arc (the complete unedited version, currently out-of-print in the U.S.)
- Just Another Day
- My Name Is Bruce
- Nobody Gets Out Alive
- Passion Play
- The Perfect Game
- Plaguers
- The Puppetoon Movie
- Puppet Master vs. Demonic Toys
- Re-Cycle
- Satanic Panic
- Scavengers
- The Secret
- Shivers
- Speed-Dating
- Starbomb
- Stuck
- Suburban Girl
- Then She Found Me
- Tokarev
- Tracey Fragments
- The Trial of the Incredible Hulk (paired with The Incredible Hulk Returns)
- Uncaged
- Undead or Alive
- Winnie Mandela
- Terminal

=== Sony Pictures/20th Television releases ===
- 20th Century Fox: The Blockbuster Years
- 20th Century Fox: The First 50 Years
- 88 Minutes
- About Last Night...
- Absence of Malice
- Adaptation
- Against All Odds
- The Age of Innocence
- ...And Justice for All.
- Apt Pupil
- Arlington Road
- Armed and Dangerous
- Awakenings
- Baby Geniuses
- The Big Hit
- Blind Date
- Bob & Carol & Ted & Alice
- California Suite
- Chances Are
- The China Syndrome
- Cowboy Bebop: The Movie
- Darkness Falls
- Desperate Measures
- Dick
- Eye of the Beholder
- The Fisher King
- Gattaca
- Half Past Dead
- Hideaway
- The Hollywood Knights
- Hush
- I Love You to Death
- Jagged Edge
- Jawbreaker
- Johnny Mnemonic
- The Medallion
- Money Train
- Nowhere to Run
- Peggy Sue Got Married
- Quicksilver
- Random Hearts
- Red Rock West
- See No Evil, Hear No Evil
- Short Circuit
- Short Circuit 2
- Sleepwalkers
- A Soldier's Story
- St. Elmo's Fire
- Stealing Harvard
- Stir Crazy
- Superbabies: Baby Geniuses 2
- The Tailor of Panama
- To Die For
- Tomcats
- The Toy
- Under Suspicion
- White Water Summer

=== Special interest ===
- The Criterion Collection
- IMAX programming

=== Television series ===
- The Adventures of Black Beauty
- Anthony Bourdain: No Reservations
- Sherlock Holmes (1954)
- Combat!
- Conan the Adventurer
- Crime Story
- The Dick Van Dyke Show
- Father Murphy
- Friday: The Animated Series
- Ghost Hunters
- Hearts Afire
- I Spy
- Monogamy
- Naked City
- The New Adventures of Black Beauty
- Nowhere Man
- Pee-wee's Playhouse
- The Prisoner
- Rags to Riches
- Saved by the Bell: The College Years
- Saved by the Bell: The New Class
- Scruff
- Sir Arthur Conan Doyle's The Lost World
- Sledge Hammer!
- Starhunter
- TekWar
- Thriller
- The Twilight Zone (1959)
- The Twilight Zone (1985)
- Thumbs!

=== Stand-up comedy ===
- Adam Hunter: Dysfunctional
- Al Ducharme: Spineless And Lovin' It
- Artie Lange: It's The Whiskey Talkin'
- Bill Burr: Why Do I Do This?
- Bill Engvall: Here's Your Sign: Live!
- Bill Maher: I'm Swiss
- Daniel Tosh: Completely Serious
- Doug Stanhope: No Refunds
- Drew Hastings: Irked & Miffed
- Eddie Griffin: Voodoo
- Eddie Izzard: We Know Where You Live
- Finesse Mitchell: Snap Famous
- Gabriel Iglesias: Hot And Fluffy
- Gilbert Gottfried: Dirty Jokes
- Howie Mandel: The First Special
- Jamie Foxx: I Might Need Security
- Jamie Foxx: Unleashed: Lost Stolen, And Leaked!
- Jamie Kennedy: Unwashed
- Jeff Dunham: Arguing with Myself
- Jeff Dunham: Spark of Insanity
- Jeff Dunham: A Very Special Christmas Special
- Jeff Foxworthy: You Might Be A Redneck If...And Check Your Neck
- Jim Gaffigan: Beyond the Pale
- Jimmy Dore: Citizen Jimmy
- Joe Rogan: Live
- John Pinette: I'm Starvin'!
- John Witherspoon: You Got To Coordinate
- Katt Williams: Live
- Kevin Downey, Jr.: I'm Not Gay, But Don't Stop
- Kyle Cease: Weirder. Blacker. Dimpler
- Larry the Cable Guy: Git-R-Done
- Michael Winslow: Comedy Sound Slapdown!
- Mike Marino: New Jersey's Bad Boy Of Comedy
- Pablo Francisco: Ouch! Live From San Jose
- Paul Mooney: Know Your History: Jesus Was Black; So Was Cleopatra
- The Pee-Wee Herman Show: Live from the Sunset Strip's Roxy Theatre
- Richard Lewis: Concerts From Hell
- Rita Rudner: Live From Las Vegas
- Ron White: They Call Me Tater Salad
- Ron White: You Can't Fix Stupid
- Steve Byrne: Happy Hour
- Steven Wright: When The Leaves Blow Away
- Tommy Tiernan: Something Mental
- Wanda Sykes: Sick & Tired

=== Music programs ===
- Alejandro Fernández: Live: In Concert
- Carlos Santana and Wayne Shorter: Live at the Montreux Jazz Festival
- Cher: The Farewell Tour
- Chicago And Earth, Wind & Fire: Live at The Greek
- Daryl Hall & John Oates: Our Kind of Soul: Live
- David Allan Coe: Live At Billy Bob's, Texas
- Dinosaur Jr.: Live in the Middle East
- Electric Light Orchestra: Zoom Tour Live
- Elvis Presley: The Ed Sullivan Shows
- Farm Aid: 20th Anniversary
- Gigantour 1 & 2
- Gram Parsons: Return to Sin City
- Heart: Alive In Seattle
- Kidsongs: Music Video Stories
- Kiss: Rock The Nation: Live!
- Korn: Live on the Other Side
- Mariah Carey: The Adventures of Mimi
- Megadeth: That One Night: Live in Buenos Aires
- Moody Blues: Lovely to See You: Live
- Phil Lesh and Friends: Live at the Warfield Theatre
- Phish: Bittersweet Motel
- Ramones: Raw
- Ray Charles: 50 Years in Music
- Ringo Starr: The Best Of Ringo Starr And His All Starr Band: So Far
- Roy Orbison: A Black & White Night
- Sammy Hagar and The Wabos: Livin' It Up! In St. Louis
- Selena Live, The Last Concert
- Sheryl Crow: Rockin' The Globe Live
- The Who: At Kilburn 1977 & Live at the Royal Albert Hall
- Yes: Yessongs
- Vicente Fernández: Live: In Concert
