= Jimmy and Stiggs =

2024 film by Joe Begos

- Theatrical release poster
- Directed by: Joe Begos
- Written by: Joe Begos
- Produced by: Joe Begos; Josh Ethier; Matt Mercer; Josh Russell; Sierra Spence
- Starring: Joe Begos; Matt Mercer
- Cinematography: Brian Sowell; Mike Testin
- Edited by: Josh Ethier
- Music by: Steve Moore
- Production company: Channel 83 Films
- Distributed by: The Horror Section
- Release dates: October 4, 2024 (Beyond Fest); August 15, 2025 (U.S.)
- Running time: 80 minutes
- Country: United States
- Language: English

Jimmy and Stiggs is a 2024 American science fiction horror film written and directed by Joe Begos. It premiered at Beyond Fest and was the first film released by Eli Roth's The Horror Section.

== Plot ==
Jimmy and Stiggs follows Jimmy Lang, a filmmaker who, after claiming he was abducted by aliens, contacts his estranged friend, Stiggs Randolph. The two reunite at Jimmy's Los Angeles apartment to prepare for an impending extraterrestrial attack. Most of the film takes place within the apartment as the two attempt to survive a siege by alien creatures.

== Cast ==
- Joe Begos as Jimmy Lang
- Matt Mercer as Stiggs Randolph
- Riley Dandy as Lexi

== Production ==
Joe Begos conceived the film during the COVID-19 pandemic. Begos served as writer, director, producer, production designer, and lead actor. Principal photography took place incrementally over approximately 100 shooting days spread across four years, primarily in Begos's own apartment in Los Angeles.

The production used 16 mm and 8 mm film formats, as well as practical special effects. Josh Ethier edited and produced the film alongside Begos under their Channel 83 Films banner.

== Release ==
Jimmy and Stiggs had its world premiere at the Beyond Fest on October 4, 2024.

In March 2025, the film was acquired by The Horror Section for distribution in the United States.

In July 2025, before the official release, Begos led a roadshow holding free midnight screenings in 12 U.S. cities, including Providence, Boston, Atlanta, Houston, Seattle, and New York.

Jimmy and Stiggs opened in theaters on August 15, 2025, on approximately 600 screens via Iconic Events. The film made its international debut at London's FrightFest in late August 2025. It was released on VOD and digital platforms on October 1, 2025.

== Reception ==
On review aggregator Rotten Tomatoes, 64% of 28 critics gave the film a positive review, with an average rating of 5.5/10.

== Spin-off ==
In June 2026, Variety reported that Sebastián De Caro had optioned the Argentine spin-off rights to Jimmy and Stiggs. Rather than a straight remake, the film will follow new characters facing the same extraterrestrial threat in Argentina, expanding the universe Begos created into new territory.
