= Joe Begos =

American film director

- Born: 1987 (age 38–39)
- Occupations: Film director, screenwriter, producer, actor
- Years active: 2011–present

Joe Begos is an American filmmaker and actor. He is best known for directing the 2019 horror film Bliss, the 2019 action-thriller film VFW, and the 2022 Christmas slasher film Christmas Bloody Christmas.

== Filmography ==
Year	Title	Director	Writer	Producer	Notes
2011	Bad Moon Rising	Yes	Yes	Yes	Short film
2011	Toxin	Yes	Yes	Yes	Short film
2013	Almost Human	Yes	Yes	Yes	Feature debut
2015	The Mind's Eye	Yes	Yes	Yes	
2018	Gutter	No	No	Yes	Short film
2019	Bliss	Yes	Yes	Yes	
2019	VFW	Yes	No	Yes	
2022	Christmas Bloody Christmas	Yes	Yes	Yes	
2024	Jimmy and Stiggs	Yes	Yes	Yes	

Acting roles

Year	Title	Role	Notes
2011	Toxin	Patient Zero	Short film
2013	Almost Human	Channel 2 Anchor	
2017	Psychopaths	Headshot	
2022	Christmas Bloody Christmas	Benny Barnes	
2024	Jimmy and Stiggs	Jimmy Lang	
