= Abraham Benrubi =

American actor (born 1969)

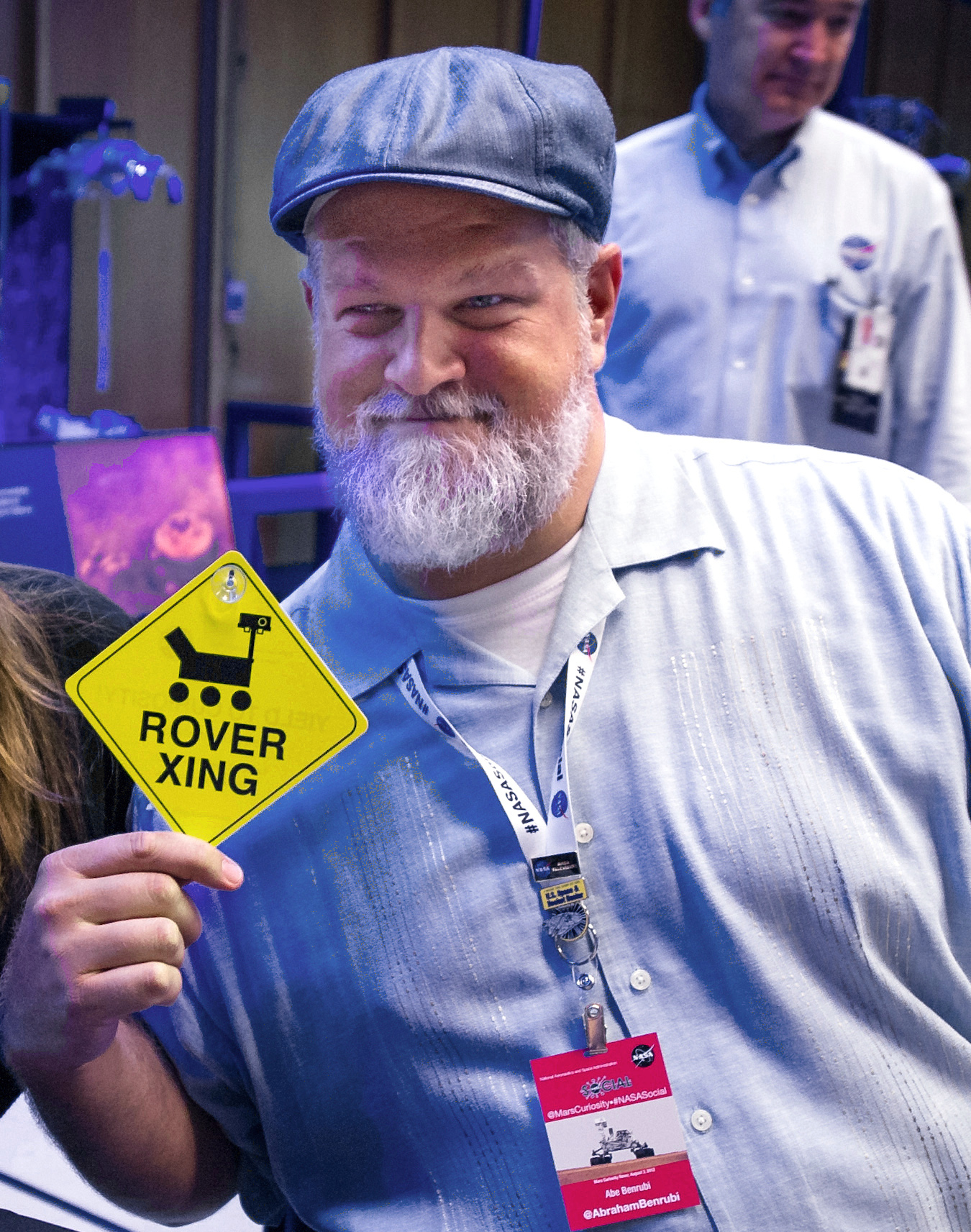
- Benrubi at a NASA Social to preview the landing of the Curiosity rover in 2012
- Born: Abraham Rubin Hercules Benrubi; October 4, 1969 (age 57); Indianapolis, Indiana, U.S.
- Other names: Abraham Ben Rubi, Abe Benrubi
- Occupations: Actor, voice actor
- Years active: 1990–present

Abraham Rubin Hercules Benrubi (born October 4, 1969) is an American actor. He is known for his appearances as Jerry Markovic on the long-running medical television drama ER, for his first role as Larry Kubiac on the series Parker Lewis Can't Lose, Dennis in Without a Paddle, and for his voice acting on the Adult Swim claymation series Robot Chicken as well as numerous video games including many in the World of Warcraft series.

== Early life and education ==
Benrubi was born on October 4, 1969, in Indianapolis, Indiana, the eldest son of Patricia and Asher Benrubi, known professionally as Adam Smasher or "The Smash", who was the lead singer of Roadmaster and a radio personality in St. Louis. His paternal grandfather was from a Greek Jewish family. His paternal grandmother, who was born to a Greek Orthodox Christian family, helped shelter Jews in Greece during World War II and later converted to Judaism. Benrubi graduated from Broad Ripple High School in Indianapolis.

== Career ==
Benrubi's early appearances included roles in the shows Growing Pains, Married... with Children and Blossom. His first major role was on the show Wings, as Roy "R.J." Biggins Jr., Roy's gay son. He would appear as R.J. twice: once during the show's second season, and again during the seventh season, shortly after he began working on NBC's ER.

Benrubi portrayed a young Dan Conner, the character portrayed by John Goodman, in a flashback episode of Roseanne.

Benrubi appeared on ER from its first season, playing desk clerk Jerry Markovic. He was a regular cast member from 1994 to 1999; again from 2002 to 2006; and again from 2008 to 2009.

Benrubi starred as one of the main characters in ABC's show Men in Trees (2006 to 2008), playing bartender/millionaire Ben Tomasson. This was a role where he got noticeably more main dialog and depth than with his previous longtime characters on ER and Parker Lewis Can't Lose, where he played a more supporting role. Ben Tomasson was described as "the cuddliest TV character since Jorge Garcia's Hurley on Lost" by TV-critic David Bianculli.

Following the cancellation of Men In Trees in early 2007, Benrubi returned to the cast of ER in late 2008 for the show's final season.

Benrubi starred in the short-lived ABC show, Happy Town (April to June 2010) where he portrayed the part of Big Dave Duncan. Almost immediately after ABC announced the series' cancellation, he appeared in a new show Memphis Beat, where he portrayed the part of police Sgt. Jody "JC" Lightfoot, a desk sergeant who is 1/16 Chickasaw by a distant relative, but chooses to embrace Native American culture all the same.

In May 2011, it was announced that he would star in Glutton, a "3D psychological thriller" directed by David Arquette. Benrubi would have played Jethro, a 1,200-pound man, forced to save his sister's life. Jethro's sister would have been portrayed by Patricia Arquette, while Kacey Barnfield would have also starred as his blind neighbor and only friend.

Benrubi is a member of Los Angeles' Sacred Fools Theater Company.

Other work includes portraying Mose in the 2003 western Open Range, a role the actor won because he had been cut out of director Kevin Costner's previous film, The Postman. He frequently voices characters on Adult Swim's stop-motion animation show Robot Chicken (created by personal friend Seth Green), and has also contributed to a second show from Chicken's creators, Titan Maximum.

== Filmography ==
=== Film ===
Film
Year	Title	Role	Notes
1990	Diving In	Rick	
1992	Crossing the Bridge	Rinny	
1993	The Program	Bud-Lite Kaminski	
1994	The Shadow	Marine Guard	
1994	Wagons East	Abe Ferguson	Credited as Abe Benrubi
1995	Magic Island	Duckbone	Direct-to-video
1996	Twister	Bubba	
1997	Talking Dessert		Short film
1997	George of the Jungle	Thor	
1997	U Turn	Biker #1	
1997	Under Oath	Geoff Carmichael	
1998	Border to Border	Geddy Paretti	
1998	I Woke Up Early the Day I Died	Bouncer	
1998	The Rugrats Movie	Serge	Voice; credited as Abe Benrubi
1999	Out in Fifty	Spike	
2001	War Story	Eric	Short film
2001	The Man Who Wasn't There	The Man at the Dance	
2002	Zig Zag	Hector	
2004	Open Range	Mose	
2004	Without a Paddle	Dennis	
2005	Miss Congeniality 2: Armed & Fabulous	Lou Steele	
2006	Wristcutters: A Love Story	Erik	
2006	Charlotte's Web	Uncle	Voice
2006	National Lampoon's TV: The Movie	Max Gottlieb	
2009	Calvin Marshall	Coach Dewey	
2010	Venus & Vegas	Bruno	
2012	Shoot'er	Punisher	Short film
2012	Deep Dark Canyon	Michael Spencer	
2012	Ambush at Dark Canyon	Garrett Kain	
2013	Bounty Killer	Jimbo	
2013	A Country Christmas	Santa Claus	
2013	A Night in Old Mexico	Big Roscoe Hammil	
2013	Chance at Romance	Jackson	
2013	My Mother Is Not a Fish	Walter	Short film
2013	String Theory	Patsy Glen	Short film
2013	Noël	Tim	Short film
2014	Ghost Light	Harvey	
2014	#Stuck	Bartender	
2014	Big Hero 6	General	Voice
2014	Ava & Lala	Mr. Bear	Voice
2014	The Blackout	Billy	
2015	Little Boy	Teacup	
2016	The Finest Hours	George "Tiny" Myers	
2016	Jessica Darling's It List	Mr. Pudel	
2016	The Belko Experiment	Chet Valincourt	
2017	Heart, Baby	Tree	
2017	Olaf's Frozen Adventure	Additional Voices	Voice; Short film
2017	Like.Share.Follow.	Detective Yarden	
2017	Aileron	Trevor	Short film
2019	Bliss	Abe	
2020	The Call of the Wild	Skookum Bench King	
2022	Christmas Bloody Christmas	Santa Claus	
2022	Strange World	Lonnie Redshirt	Voice
2023	The Old Way	Big Mike	
2024	Rust	Big Bill Cochrane	
2026	Hexed †	TBA	Voice

=== Television ===
Television
Year	Title	Role	Notes
1990	Growing Pains	Really Big Kid	Episode: "Mike, the Teacher"
1990–1996	Wings	Roy "R.J." Biggins Jr.	2 episodes
1990–1993	Parker Lewis Can't Lose	Larry Kubiac	66 episodes
1991–1993	Married... with Children	Jimmy/Baby	2 episodes
1992	Blossom	Francis	Episode: "Whines and Misdemeanors"
1992	Angel Street		Pilot episode
1992	Roseanne	Teenage Dan	Episode: "Halloween IV"
1993	Grace Under Fire	Mark	Episode: "Grace Undergraduate"
1994–2009	ER	Jerry Markovic	137 episodes
1995	Out There	Roy	Television film
1998	Sleepwalkers	Vincent Konefke	Main role
1998	Cold Feet	Man on the Bus	Television film
1998	Tempting Fate	John Bolladine	Television film
1999	The X-Files	Big Mike Raskin	Episode: "Arcadia"
1999	A Touch of Hope	Dr. Neil Bachman	Television film
2000	Dark Angel	Break	Episode: "Flushed"
2001–2002	Buffy the Vampire Slayer	Olaf	2 episodes
2002	Going to California	Harvey	Episode: "Mixed Doubles"
2005	Unscripted	Himself	Episode 1 pilot
2005	Criminal Minds	Frank Fielding	Episode: "The Fox"
2005–2017	American Dad!	Todd and Employee	Voice, 2 episodes
2005–2018	Robot Chicken	Darth Vader, Optimus Prime, Eeyore, Ving Rhames, Fidel Castro, Dominic Toretto, Cyborg, Bowser, various characters	27 episodes; Sometimes credited as Abe Benrubi; One episode uncredited
2006	Pizza Time	Bruno	Television film
2006	Dr. Vegas	Star Wars Thug	Episode 8: "Heal Thyself
2006-2008	Men in Trees	Ben Thomasson	Main role
2007	Robot Chicken: Star Wars	Darth Vader	Voice
2008	Robot Chicken: Star Wars Episode II	Darth Vader and Owen Lars	Voice
2008	1%	Citizen Dave	Unaired pilot for an HBO series
2009	Titan Maximum	Drill Instructor	Episode 6: "Dirty Lansbury"
2010	Happy Town	Big Dave Duncan	6 episodes
2010	Memphis Beat	Sgt. JC Lightfoot/Jody	10 episodes
2010	Robot Chicken: Star Wars Episode III	Darth Vader and Owen Lars	Voice
2011	Team Unicorn	The Professor	Episode: "Alien Beach Crashers"
2012	Community	Orderly	Episode: "Curriculum Unavailable"
2012	Robot Chicken DC Comics Special	Cyborg, Kilowog, Appa Ali Apsa, Solomon Grundy	Voice
2012	Bones	Willis McCullum	Episode: "The Method in the Madness"
2012	Pair of Kings	Silver Fox	Episode: "Yeti, Set, Snow"
2012	Star Wars Detours	Additional Voices	Voice; Series unaired, hiatus
2012–2013	Brickleberry	Mr. Cunaman, Meat-Hammer	Voice, 2 episodes
2013	Once Upon a Time	Arlo	Episode: "Tiny"
2013	The Garcias Have Landed	Admiral Lomax	Television film
2013	Chance at Romance	Jackson	Television film
2014–2015	Bosch	Rodney Belk	4 episodes
2014	Beware the Batman	Street Thug	Voice, episode: "Fall"
2014	The Bridge	DEA Agent Joe McKenzie	10 episodes
2016	TripTank	Chief	Voice, episode: "Crime Steve Investigation"
2016	Outcast	Caleb	3 episodes
2017	APB	Pete McCann	11 episodes
2017	Still the King	Leslie	Episode: "Who's Your Daddy?"
2019	Chicago Fire	Russ LaPointe	Episode: "The White Whale"
2020–22	It's Pony	George Bramley	Voice, recurring role
2026	Holiday Touchdown: A Bears Love Story	Santa Claus	Television Film

=== Video games ===
Video games
Year	Title	Role	Notes
2001	Mystery Island II		Voice
2001	Myth III: The Wolf Age		Voice
2004	World of Warcraft	Additional Voices	Voice
2005	ER	Jerry Markovic	Voice
2012	Skylanders: Giants	Additional Voices	Voice
2013	Skylanders: Swap Force	Additional Voices	Voice
2014	Diablo III: Reaper of Souls	Urzael	Voice
2014	Diablo III: Ultimate Evil Edition	Urzael	Voice
2014	World of Warcraft: Warlords of Draenor	Additional Voices and Monster Vocal Effects	Voice
2015	Heroes of the Storm	Diablo	Voice
2015	StarCraft II: Legacy of the Void	Additional Voices	Voice
2016	World of Warcraft: Legion	Additional Voices	Voice
2018	World of Warcraft: Battle for Azeroth	Additional Voices	Voice
2022	World of Warcraft: Dragonflight		Voice; Credited as Abe Benrubi
