= Nothing Bad Can Happen =

2013 film

- Theatrical release poster
- German: Tore tanzt
- Directed by: Katrin Gebbe
- Written by: Katrin Gebbe
- Produced by: Verena Gräfe-Höft
- Starring: Julius Feldmeier; Sascha Alexander Gersak; Annika Kuhl; Swantje Kohlhof
- Cinematography: Moritz Schultheiß
- Edited by: Heike Gnida
- Music by: Johannes Lehniger; Peter Folk
- Production companies: JunaFilm; ZDF Das Kleine Fernsehspiel
- Distributed by: Rapid Eye Movies
- Release dates: 23 May 2013 (Cannes); 28 November 2013 (Germany)
- Running time: 110 minutes
- Country: Germany
- Language: German

Nothing Bad Can Happen (German: Tore tanzt) is a 2013 German psychological horror drama film directed and written by Katrin Gebbe. It was screened in the Un Certain Regard section at the 2013 Cannes Film Festival, following the acquisition of the United States rights by Drafthouse Films.

== Plot ==
Tore is a young man living in a Hamburg commune with a group of self-proclaimed “Jesus Freaks.” While on a car trip, he and a friend, Owl, fix a man’s car by praying over it. The man, Benno, later shows up at a commune-hosted rock show, at which Tore suffers an epileptic seizure. Benno carries him out and drives him to the hospital. Tore wakes up in the car and explains that he had a vision from God, and that it happens often. Benno brings Tore home and introduces him to his wife, Astrid, her children from a previous relationship, daughter Sanny, and son Dennis. They end up informally adopting Tore, giving him food and letting him sleep in a tent in the front yard in exchange for performing house maintenance.

At Sanny’s 15th birthday party, Tore buys her a used MP3 player to replace one that was broken. Benno, whose gift was a cheap stuffed kangaroo, is jealous and hits Tore, giving him a bloody nose. He apologizes and claims that it won’t happen again. Later, Benno tells his family not to attend a local dance on a night when he is busy with work and can’t come along. Tore convinces them to go anyway, something which angers Benno when he finds out. Later, Tore goes back to visit the commune only to find out that the members have relocated to Berlin. Owl offers to bring Tore along, but he declines, saying that he feels he needs to convert Benno and his family.

Sanny and Tore begin to grow closer, with her often visiting him in his tent. During these visits, Sanny reveals bruises on her arms. Benno spots her leaving his tent one night, and later asks Tore if he has “bagged” her yet. Sanny and Tore’s bond culminates in them sneaking out one night and swimming in a neighbor’s pool. They kiss briefly, and Sanny attempts to seduce him, but Tore declines, citing his faith and her age. Upon returning home, Sanny is brushing her teeth when Benno comes into the bathroom, physically accosts her, and chastises her for leading Tore on. Tore catches them, and Benno responds by grabbing a stray cat, trapping it in a vat of water, and daring Tore to intervene. Tore suffers a seizure, and the cat drowns.

Tore begins spending as little time as possible in the house. Benno frames Tore for stealing food from the trash, and he and Astrid force him to eat rotting chicken. He contracts food poisoning, but Benno refuses to take him to the hospital. Sanny sneaks him out of the house, takes him to a bus station, and calls an ambulance. While at the hospital, Tore suffers a seizure, during which he hallucinates drinking blood from the hands of Jesus. Due to his epilepsy, a nurse offers Tore treatment at a mental facility, but he declines, choosing to return to Benno’s house.

Not long after he returns, Benno takes Tore to a brothel where one of his friends rapes him. Throughout all of the abuse, Tore refuses to fight back, wishing to “turn the other cheek.” At a social event held at their house, Benno goes to Tore, lies on the ground, and dares Tore to smother him. Tore halfheartedly tries, but Sanny rushes into the room, joins in, and they team up to try and kill Benno. He manages to free himself and beats Tore to the point of near death. While unconscious, Tore is assaulted further by Astrid and a female friend, who put out cigarettes on him, spit in his wounds, and are implied to have emasculated him.

The next day, Benno, Astrid, and their friends drive the barely conscious Tore to a secluded area where he is abandoned. Before leaving, Benno asks Tore, “Where is your God now?” Tore smiles, points to his chest, and says, “Here.” Back at home, Sanny and Dennis pack their belongings and run away, with the final shot of the film showing them walking hand in hand down the road to a new future.

== Cast ==
- Julius Feldmeier as Tore
- Sascha Alexander Geršak as Benno
- Annika Kuhl as Astrid
- Gro Swantje Kohlhof as Sanny
- Til-Niklas Theinert as Dennis
- Daniel Michel as Eule
- Nadine Boske as Cora
- Laura Lo Zito as Lilli
- Enno Hesse as Jasper
- Uwe Dag Berlin as Dieter
- Christian Bergmann as Klaus
- Torben Lohmann as Pastor

== Background ==
The film is based on true events that were discovered by Gebbe in an Internet article. The director explained in a July 2013 interview: "The characters deeply touched me ... It was so far away from life. And I felt there would be so many themes to discover – about relationships, guilt, desire, belief, idealism, love, bravery… I was searching for more than an easy explanation."

From the outset, Gebbe collaborated with producer Verena Gräfe-Höft and the pair attained funding from German film fund Hamburg Schleswig-Holstein (FFHSH). Following the approval of financing, Gebbe wrote the screenplay for the film that she would also direct. Gebbe explained the next step in the July 2013 interview:

In Germany you really have to find a TV channel to raise most of the money and get some more from the film funds. So that next step was tough. We wanted to follow our vision, which of course would also mean that the story would be told in an arthouse way. We didn't want to compromise what we wanted to show and what we didn't want to tell.

Following the receipt of further funding from FFHSH, as well as the Nordmedia company, production commenced, and the crew and cast received low salaries due to the low budget of the film. The film is Gebbe's debut feature film and is the first female-directed film to enter the Drafthouse catalog.

Following the film's screening at Cannes in May 2013, the film was also included in the program of the Melbourne International Film Festival (MIFF), held during July and August 2013. Gebbe was in attendance at both of the MIFF screenings and participated in Q&A sessions with festival goers.

== Reception ==
Nothing Bad Can Happen was the only German feature film at the 2013 Cannes Film Festival and Gebbe revealed the response that she observed following the Cannes screening: "We expected it to be controversial, and that was what happened. We had boos and cheers, escapees and long standing ovations. It was intense! I think we stirred up a hornets' nest. And that is what artists should do." As of 28 July 2013, critical reviews of Gebbe's debut are mixed. Variety's Scott Foundas acknowledges the director's talent, the memorable acting efforts of newcomers Julius Feldmeier and Swantje Kohlhof, and the cinematography of Moritz Schultheiss, but also labels Gebbe's work on the film as "muddled" and "misdirected." Ion Cinema's Nicolas Bell concludes his review by stating "there’s something that doesn’t quite sit well by the closing credits" and criticizes a "weak" script. In a break from its usual format, horror film website Fangoria published a review of the film by Samuel Zimmerman who commended Gebbe's film as a "riveting example of transcendent horror."

On review aggregator website Rotten Tomatoes, the film holds an approval rating of 70% based on 27 reviews, with an average rating of 6.5/10.

== Curiosity ==
The title "Tore TanzT" visually recalls the letter T three times, which resembles a cross.

=== Accolades ===
The film won the Emeric Pressburger Prize at the 2013 Miskolc International Film Festival.

== Release ==
The film is an official selection for the 2014 Stanley Film Festival.
