= Bliss (2019 film) =

2019 horror film by Joe Begos

- Film poster
- Directed by: Joe Begos
- Starring: Dora Madison
- Cinematography: Mike Testin
- Edited by: Josh Ethier
- Music by: Steve Moore
- Distributed by: Dark Sky Films
- Release date: September 27, 2019
- Running time: 80 minutes
- Country: United States
- Language: English

Bliss is a 2019 horror film written and directed by Joe Begos. Described as a vampire film, it concerns an artist named Dezzy (Dora Madison Burge, credited as Dora Madison) who descends into madness after taking a hallucinogenic drug to overcome a creative block.

== Cast ==
- Dora Madison as Dezzy
- Tru Collins as Courtney
- Rhys Wakefield as Ronnie
- Jeremy Gardner as Clive
- Graham Skipper as Hadrian
- Chris McKenna as David
- Rachel Avery as Nikki St. Jean
- Mark Beltzman as Lance
- George Wendt as Pops
- Abraham Benrubi as Abe

== Release ==
Begos showed Bliss at 2019's Fantastic Fest in Austin, alongside another current film of his, VFW. It was also shown at New Orleans's Overlook Film Festival.

== Reception ==
On Rotten Tomatoes the film has a rating of 87% based on reviews from 45 critics, with an average rating of 7.2/10. The site's the consensus states: "Bliss maybe too narratively and visually intense for less adventurous viewers, but should trigger the titular state for those with a taste for hard hitting horror." On Metacritic it has a score of 53% based on reviews from six critics

The A.V. Club reviewer Katie Rife said that it "represents a stylistic leap forward for its director" and compared it to the work of Lucio Fulci, Gaspar Noé, and Abel Ferrara.
