= The Vast of Night =

2019 American science fiction film by Andrew Patterson

- Promotional release poster
- Directed by: Andrew Patterson
- Written by: Andrew Patterson (Note: Credited as James Montague); Craig W. Sanger
- Produced by: Andrew Patterson; Melissa Kirkendall; Adam Dietrich
- Starring: Sierra McCormick; Jake Horowitz
- Cinematography: M. I. Littin-Menz
- Edited by: Junius Tully
- Music by: Erick Alexander; Jared Bulmer
- Production company: GED Cinema
- Distributed by: Amazon Studios
- Release dates: January 26, 2019 (Slamdance); May 29, 2020 (United States)
- Running time: 89 minutes
- Country: United States
- Language: English
- Budget: $700,000

The Vast of Night is a 2019 American science fiction mystery film directed by Andrew Patterson. It was co-produced and written by Patterson (under the pseudonym James Montague) and Craig W. Sanger. The story takes place in 1950s New Mexico and is loosely based on the Kecksburg UFO incident and Foss Lake disappearances. The film follows young switchboard operator Fay Crocker (Sierra McCormick) and radio disc jockey Everett Sloan (Jake Horowitz) as they discover a mysterious audio frequency of unknown origin.

The Vast of Night premiered at the Slamdance Film Festival in January 2019. Amazon Studios acquired the distribution rights and released it on May 29, 2020 in drive-in theaters in the United States and via video-on-demand on Amazon Prime Video. Critics praised the direction, cinematography, historical authenticity, as well as the performances of McCormick and Horowitz. At the 1st Critics' Choice Super Awards in 2021, the film received three nominations and several other accolades.

== Plot ==
In the 1950s fictional town of Cayuga, New Mexico, teenage disc jockey Everett helps prepare for a high-school basketball game. He and his friend Fay test her new tape recorder before Everett walks her to her job as a switchboard operator and begins his shift at WOTW radio station.

While listening to Everett's broadcast, Fay hears a mysterious audio signal interrupt the program. A woman calls to report a large object hovering over her property, though the static weakens her voice. Fay alerts Everett, who asks listeners to call in with information about the signal.

A man named Billy phones the station, and Everett broadcasts the conversation live. Billy says he served in the military and was transported to a secret desert facility, where he and other personnel constructed a vast underground bunker to contain an enormous unidentified object. During a flight away from the site, he heard the same strange signal over the aircraft radio.

Billy later developed a lung condition that he attributes to his work there and learned of similar military operations involving buried cargo accompanied by the same signal. He believes the sound functions as a communication signal, sometimes transmitted from altitudes beyond the reach of human aircraft.

After the call is briefly disconnected, Billy phones again and explains that all personnel involved in the projects were either Black or Mexican, which he suspects was intended to make their testimony easier to dismiss. He says a friend secretly recorded the signal and distributed copies to former workers, including a deceased United States Air Force member from Cayuga.

Realizing the tapes were donated to the local library, Fay retrieves them. Everett and Fay locate the recording and broadcast it, but the station suddenly loses power. They rush to the switchboard office, where Fay receives numerous reports of "something in the sky". On the way, they encounter Gerald and Bertsie, who have been pursuing the same object. An elderly woman named Mabel then calls, offering further information.

Everett and Fay visit Mabel's home and find her reciting phrases in an unknown language. While Everett records the conversation, Mabel claims the phenomena are spacecraft operated by "the people in the sky", who communicate with and abduct humans. She believes the beings target isolated individuals while the town attends the basketball game and are responsible for encouraging conflict among humanity.

Mabel asks them to take her to the ship so she can reunite with her son, who she says was abducted years earlier, or at least deliver a written message. Skeptical, Everett refuses and leaves with Fay, who returns home to collect her baby sister Maddie. Gerald and Bertsie pick them up, but when Everett plays Mabel's recorded speech, the two fall into a trance and nearly crash the car. Frightened, Everett and Fay flee with Maddie into the woods.

There, they discover charred trees and branches, convincing Everett that the visitors are real and nearby. Reaching a clearing, they witness a spacecraft rejoin a massive mothership, which sends powerful winds swirling around them.

After the basketball game ends, the townspeople emerge to find Everett, Fay, and Maddie missing. Only their footprints and tape recorder remain.

== Title ==
The title "The Vast of Night" is from Shakespeare's The Tempest. Starting with line 325 of Act I, scene II, Prospero addresses Caliban:

For this, be sure, tonight thou shalt have cramps
Side-stitches that shall pen thy breath up. Urchins
Shall, for that vast of night that they may work,
All exercise on thee ...

== Cast ==
- Sierra McCormick as Fay Crocker
- Jake Horowitz as Everett Sloan
- Bruce Davis as Billy
- Gail Cronauer as Mabel Blanche
- Mark Banik as Gerald
- Gregory Peyton as Benny Wade

== Production ==
According to the director Andrew Patterson, the film came out of one of the ideas he had in the previous decade, which simply said: "1950s black and white. New Mexico, UFO landing." Patterson wrote the script with Craig W. Sanger, although he registered the script with the WGA under the pseudonym James Montague, who is also listed as the producer. Patterson also financed the film himself with earnings from his work producing commercials and shorts for the Oklahoma City Thunder and others. It was filmed in three to four weeks at a cost of $700,000.

The film was shot mostly in Whitney, Texas, during the fall of 2016, starting in September. The town was selected after looking through many towns to find one with the right gymnasium. In order to get the period details correct, the production team removed the three-point line of the basketball court in the gym at a cost of $20,000, and they found functional switchboards which were used at that time. The cinematographer for the film was M.I. Littin-Menz. Patterson spent a year editing the film.

== Release ==
The film premiered at the 2019 Slamdance Film Festival and went on to screen at several other film festivals. Amazon Studios acquired the movie in September 2019, and the trailer was released on February 6, 2020. The film was released in drive-in cinemas nationally on May 15, 2020, and on Amazon Prime on May 29.

== Reception ==
=== Critical response ===
On review aggregator website Rotten Tomatoes, the film holds an approval rating of 92% based on 249 reviews, with an average rating of 7.8/10. The site's critics consensus reads: "An engrossing sci-fi thriller that transcends its period trappings, The Vast of Night suggests great things for debuting director Andrew Patterson." Metacritic assigned the film a weighted average score of 84 out of 100, based on 35 critics, indicating "universal acclaim".

David Fear of Rolling Stone called the film an "ingenious debut from director Andrew Patterson". Katie Rife of The A.V. Club wrote that it "manages to be eerie and compelling" and "despite its intergalactic scope, this is an intimate, character-driven film." Amy Taubin of Film Comment called it "a display of visionary moviemaking intelligence", comparing it to first features by directors such as Richard Kelly and Christopher Nolan. Meg Shields of Film School Rejects commended the sound design as "inescapable and essential" and M.I. Littin-Menz's camerawork as "simply amazing".

Variety's Amy Nicholson praised the film as charming and inventive, writing, "At the midpoint, Patterson wows with a tracking shot that seems to race a half-mile down a quiet street, take a left-hook through a parking lot, sprint through an ongoing basketball game, and zip up the crowded bleachers before plunging out of a window. It's effective razzle-dazzle that will probably get the young Oklahoman hired to make something 20 times The Vast of Night's budget. Yet, the ambition behind it is just as impressive – as is the crew’s creativity at spinning financial limitations into magic."

Writing for IndieWire, Ryan Lattanzio stated that "None of this would work without Horowitz and McCormick’s performances, which already feel iconic." In Forbes, Christopher Orr wrote, "Patterson’s young leads, McCormick and Horowitz, are both exceptional, the former offering an indelible portrait of the intrepid good-girl, and the latter recalling a young Christian Slater with his mesmerizing patter, half-cool, half-nerd."

Josh Weiss, also writing in Forbes, said "The Vast of Night might have collapsed under the weight of its own ambitions, had it not been for its two electrifying leads. Horowitz is an absolute revelation, especially since this is his first time as a leading cast member. He brings Everett, who always seems to have a cigarette dangling from his lips, to vivid life with a boatload of charisma and an unparalleled sense of cool that channels American’ Graffiti’s John Milner or Dazed and Confused’s David Wooderson."

Jacob Oller of Paste listed the performance of McCormick on "The 10 Breakout Film Performances of the Year", where they particularly praised her work in "the ten-minute scene, done in a single take, involving McCormick operating a switchboard trying to find out what has gone wrong in the sci-fi film’s desert town... It’s just McCormick out there, exposed, carrying the film for an unbroken ten minutes. It’s Olympic-level acting and she nails it, finding the exact tempo with which to pace her escalating concern."

=== Awards and nominations ===
At the 2019 Slamdance Film Festival, it won the Audience Award for Best Narrative Feature. At the 2019 Toronto International Film Festival, it was named first runner-up for the People's Choice Award in the Midnight Madness category. It won the Grand Jury Prize at the 2019 Overlook Film Festival and a Special Cinematography Award at the 2019 Hamptons International Film Festival, and was nominated for Best First Screenplay at the Independent Spirit Awards and Best International Feature film at the 2019 Edinburgh International Film Festival. At the 2021 Critics' Choice Super Awards, it received three nominations for Best Science Fiction/Fantasy Movie, and Best Actor and Actress in a Science Fiction/Fantasy Movie for Horowitz and McCormick, respectively.
