= The Rivals of Amziah King =

2025 film by Andrew Patterson

- Theatrical release poster
- Directed by: Andrew Patterson
- Written by: Andrew Patterson (Note: Credited as James Montague)
- Produced by: David Heyman; Teddy Schwarzman; Jeffrey Clifford; Michael Heimler; Andrew Patterson; Will Greenfield
- Starring: Matthew McConaughey; Kurt Russell; Angelina LookingGlass; Jake Horowitz; Scott Shepherd; Rob Morgan; Tony Revolori; Owen Teague; Bruce Davis; Cole Sprouse
- Cinematography: Miguel I. Littin-Menz
- Edited by: Patrick J. Smith
- Music by: Erick Alexander; Jared Bulmer; Ben Hardesty
- Production companies: Black Bear Pictures; Heyday Films; G.E.D. Media
- Distributed by: Black Bear Pictures
- Release dates: March 10, 2025 (SXSW); August 14, 2026 (United States)
- Running time: 131 minutes
- Country: United States
- Language: English
- Box office: $3.7 million

The Rivals of Amziah King is a 2025 American neo-Western black comedy film written and directed by Andrew Patterson and produced by Black Bear Pictures and Heyday Films. It stars Matthew McConaughey, Kurt Russell, Angelina LookingGlass, Scott Shepherd, Rob Morgan, and Tony Revolori.

It had its world premiere at the South by Southwest Festival on March 10, 2025, and was theatrically released in the United States on August 14, 2026.

== Plot ==
In rural Oklahoma, beekeeper and bluegrass musician Amziah King is called on by OSBI Agent Sunderland to identify a truckload of stolen honey. Amziah's former employee Remmick arrives with his friend Colmar to help, but the honey extractor tears off Colmar's scalp. Retrieving the scalp and Colmar's lucky hat, Amziah and his right-hand man Jimmy speed to the hospital, where Amziah receives medication for his heart condition.

Amziah reunites with his former foster Native American daughter Kateri, who just lost her mother, sharing his homespun philosophy about church potlucks and introducing her to his musician friends and Brazilian neighbors. He offers her a job caring for his honeybee farm, and they spend a chaotic day removing a swarm of bees from an elementary school, as she comes to share his love for the honeybee, bluegrass music, and their tight-knit community.

However, Amziah's hives are stolen, and the shock leads him to suffer a fatal heart attack. Following his death, his lawyer and bandmate Rippy informs Kateri that she has inherited his struggling honey business with its debts. Kateri refuses to sell, determined to find the thieves and continue Amziah's legacy. Jailed for drunk driving, Jimmy urges Kateri to track down the hives, but her inquiries turn up empty as the business runs out of honey.

An owner of the previously stolen honey points Kateri to a fellow beekeeper who unknowingly bought some of Amziah's missing hives. With the information-gathering services of paroled criminal Oat, Kateri discovers that Amziah's bees were stolen by Wenyon Amos Stone, a thieving beekeeper working for powerful businessman Dob McCoy. After following Wenyon, Kateri locks him in his overheated honey processing room, killing him.

Kateri enlists Remmick's help to steal back Amziah's bees. They sneak onto Wenyon's remote property, floating the hives on makeshift rafts down the river to their getaway truck. The heist is caught on camera, and Remmick is arrested for breaking parole. The recovered bees and honey are sent to auction, and Rippy helps raise money for Kateri but she is outbid by Dob, who has grown rich by taking advantage of his neighbors.

Vowing to destroy Dob's life, the vengeful Kateri nearly poisons his dog, and realizes that he is caring for his critically ill wife. At a church potluck, Kateri secretly prepares a meal for Dob to take to his wife, poisoning her with castor beans. Her suspicious death enables Sunderland and the police to attempt to arrest Dob on murder charges, but he leads them on a high-speed chase. Dob is struck by a freight train and flees in a stolen truck but is pursued by armed citizens in another pickup and gunned down. Following his death, Sunderland is able to expose his crimes.

Remmick and Jimmy are paroled, joining Kateri and their friends in stealing back Amziah's hives again, and a sympathetic Sunderland considers the matter closed. Having satisfied her desire for revenge and saved Amziah's beloved bees, Kateri is determined to become the new queen bee of the local honey trade.

== Cast ==
- Matthew McConaughey as Amziah King
- Kurt Russell as Dob McCoy
- Angelina LookingGlass as Kateri
- Jake Horowitz as Remmick
- Scott Shepherd as Jimmy
- Rob Morgan as Rippy
- Tony Revolori as Colmar
- Owen Teague as Pirate
- Bruce Davis as Sunderland
- Cole Sprouse as Oat
- Catherine Dyer as Mrs. McCurdy
- Jason Davis as Winton
- Sandra Ellis Lafferty as Brenda
- Harris Stone as Ross Crown
- Sharon Blackwood as Juanita
- Chip Carriere as Wenyon Amos Stone

== Production ==
In May 2023, it was announced that Andrew Patterson wrote and would direct The Rivals of Amziah King, with Matthew McConaughey starring and Black Bear Pictures financing the film. Patterson had been developing the film since 2020; Prior to McConaughey joining the film, Denzel Washington met with Patterson for the lead role but demanded more creative control than Patterson was comfortable offering.

In July 2023, Kurt Russell was cast in the film. Rob Morgan, Scott Shepherd, Cole Sprouse, Owen Teague, Tony Revolori, Jake Horowitz and Angelina LookingGlass quietly joined the cast around the same time with LookingGlass chosen over 200 other candidates.

Filming occurred in Alabama during the 2023 SAG-AFTRA strike in which SAG-AFTRA granted the filmmakers an interim agreement to allow principal photography to occur during the strike. In August 2023, it was announced that filming wrapped in Alabama.

During a lengthy post-production, Patterson faced creative clashes with his producers before his vision ultimately won out. There was an alternate cut overseen by unsatisfied producers that ultimately tested lower than Patterson's.

== Release ==
It had its world premiere at the 2025 South by Southwest Film & TV Festival on March 10, 2025. In August 2025, Black Bear Pictures announced that they would release the film themselves theatrically through their new U.S. distribution division, with a release date to be announced. The film was released in limited theaters on August 14, before going wide in the United States on August 21, 2026.

== Reception ==
On the review aggregator website Rotten Tomatoes, 88% of 110 critics' reviews are positive, with an average rating of 8.1/10. The website's consensus reads: "The Rivals of Amziah King is a sprawling, unpredictable, and genre-blurring epic, anchored by Matthew McConaughey's charm and Angelina LookingGlass's striking debut." Metacritic, which uses a weighted average, assigned the film a score of 74 out of 100, based on 22 critics, indicating "generally favorable" reviews.
