= Sleepwalkers (TV series) =

- Genre: Science fiction Mystery; Horror; Supernatural drama
- Created by: David S. Goyer; Stephen Kronish
- Written by: Stephen Gaghan; David A. Weinstein; Sara Charno
- Starring: Bruce Greenwood; Naomi Watts; Abraham Benrubi
- Country of origin: United States
- Original language: English
- No. of seasons: 1
- No. of episodes: 9 (2 unaired)

Production
- Camera setup: Single-camera
- Running time: 45 minutes
- Production companies: NBC Studios; Columbia TriStar Television

Original release
- Network: NBC
- Release: November 1, 1997 – May 31, 1998

Sleepwalkers is an American science fiction series which began airing on NBC in late 1997. It tells the story of a team of researchers who used technology to enter the dreams of psychiatric patients in order to diagnose their problems. It briefly revived NBC's Saturday night supernatural/paranormal programming block, Thrillogy, but the show was canceled after two episodes.

The show was created by Stephen Kronish and David S. Goyer.

== Cast ==
- Bruce Greenwood as Dr. Nathan Bradford
- Naomi Watts as Kate Russell
- Abraham Benrubi as Vincent Konefke
- Kathrin Nicholson as Gail Bradford
- Jeffrey D. Sams as Ben Costigan

== Production ==
In February 1997, it was announced Columbia TriStar Television was developing Sleepwalkers, a series about a team of scientists who solve people's problems by entering their dreams The series concept was developed by David S. Goyer and Stephen Kronish. While NBC was intrigued by the concept, then NBC President Warren Littlefield felt the concept needed to be ironed out as sci-fi/horror concepts of Goyer's writing didn't quite mesh with the dramatic elements of Kronish's style. Due to the nature of the series there was tension between the creative team and the executives as to how much surrealism the audience would be willing to accept with attempts to embrace the surreal nature of the concept met with resistance from executives.

== Cancellation ==
Although nine episodes were produced, NBC canceled national airings of the series after just two episodes. Five episodes went on to be seen only on the West Coast and the show's final two episodes were never broadcast in the United States but did air elsewhere.

== Episodes ==
No.	Title	Directed by	Original release date	Prod. code
1	"Something Is Buried in Bethlehem" "Pilot"	David Nutter	November 1, 1997	100
A crack dream team of researchers enters the subconscious of their sleeping patients in this sci-fi flavored drama. In the opener, neurophysiologist Nathan Bradford tries to help a former Air Force pilot interpret a recurring nightmare in which a shadowy figure pursues him over a forbidding landscape. The Morpheus Institute's Kate Russell and Steve Turner enter the pilot's dreamscape in an attempt to thwart the mysterious apparition—and to determine the meaning of "Nevur," a cryptic message scrawled on a wall. Written by David S. Goyer & Stephen Kronish, and directed by David Nutter.
2	"Night Terrors"	Bill Malone	November 8, 1997	102
Still traumatized by his near-death experience, Steve attempts to try to control his dreams again. Meanwhile, Nathan helps a boy who is troubled by dreams of a "Smiling Man". (This would be the final episode of the series to be broadcast nationally by NBC. The network would restrict the remaining shows to the West Coast only.). Written by Stephen Gaghan and directed by Kristoffer Tabori.
3	"Eye of the Beholder"	James Whitmore Jr.	February 8, 1998	104
Kate and Ben investigate couple where the wife is having dreams of her husband killing her, and the husband is having dreams of being killed by his lover. But in the process, a member of the team is lost.
4	"Forlorn"	Jeffrey W. Woolnough	February 15, 1998	103
When the men of the small mining town of Forlorn begin slipping into unexplained comas, Nathan and his team are called in to investigate. They quickly discover that a succubus--an erotic demon--is responsible, but will they find it in time to stop one of their own from becoming the next victim?
5	"Counting Sheep"	Bill Malone	March 8, 1998	101
Kate becomes trapped inside the mind of a dying serial killer who still has a few tricks up his sleeve. Written by David S. Goyer, and directed by William Malone.
6	"Passed Imperfect"	Lee Bonner	April 5, 1998	105
After years of being out of her life, Gail's absentee father Joel Cahill re-surfaces to find a way to apologize to his daughter, despite the fact she is in a coma. But Joel's secretly withheld medical ailment may accidentally lead to the death of Nathan. Written by Jonathan Robert Kaplan, and directed by Lee Bonner.
7	"A Matter of Fax"	James Whitmore Jr.	May 31, 1998	106
A troubled patient brings a dream of murder to the team, convinced that he has killed a woman he doesn't know. Kate believes in his innocence while Nathan and the police are concerned. Joining his dreams where the murder occurs the team start to learn about the others players in the dream and are drawn into chasing the other people that appear in the dream.
8	"Sub Subconscious"	TBD	Unaired in the U.S.	107
A Stephen King-like horror writer is having nightmares about being strangled by the monster out of his newest novel. The Sleepwalkers voyage into his dreams and find a copy of his newest manuscript with another man's name on it. Tracing it back, they try to find the man, but he committed suicide with an unfinished novel.. the very novel the horror writer is struggling with. Written by Stephen Gaghan & David Weinstein, and directed by Michael Katleman.
9	"Cassandra"	TBD	Unaired in the U.S.	108
Ben Costigan is having nightmares about his son being killed. While out for a walk, a woman on the grounds of a mental hospital comments that his son is going to die. Going into her dreams turns out to be difficult because she is schitzophrenic, but she predicts the murder of an insurance salesman so Ben starts taking her seriously. She shows the Sleepwalkers that the death of Ben's son is going to happen at a hospital, but can they find the right hospital in time? Written by Sara B. Charno & Stephen Kronish, and directed by Cliff Bole.

== Releases ==
All nine episodes were released on VHS in Japan in the late 1990s by Columbia TriStar Home Video, but were rental-only titles and could not be purchased directly.

Warner Vision in Germany released most of the episodes on DVD as both individual PAL Region 2 titles and as box sets. The German releases feature a Dolby Digital 5.1 track in German, but the English track is the same Dolby Surround that the show was originally broadcast in.

On October 20, 2005 it was released by Warner Bros. Home Entertainment in Australia as a three-disc set but it only features six of the episodes in random order. Each disc features two 45-minute episodes combined into one 90-minute film ("Something Is Buried in Bethlehem – Night Terror," "Forlorn – Counting Sheep," and "Eye of The Beholder – A Matter of Fax").

To date, Sony Pictures Home Entertainment does not currently have any plans of releasing the show on DVD in the United States.

Shout! Factory listed a complete series DVD set as part of their inventory, but it is unknown whether the company ever released it or whether it is currently available.

Mill Creek Entertainment announced a DVD release of the complete series, but never released it.

== See also ==
- Paprika, a 2006 anime film by Satoshi Kon that features a similar premise
