= Maestro Harrell =

American singer

- Also known as: M A E S T R O
- Born: July 29, 1991 (age 35); Chicago, Illinois, U.S.
- Genres: Rap, R&B, Pop, progressive house, electro house, big room house, future house, future bass, trap
- Occupations: DJ, Record Producer, Singer-Songwriter, Recording Artist, Actor
- Instruments: Vocals, Piano, Drums, Guitars, Keyboard
- Years active: 1996–present
- Labels: Def Jam, WonderWall Recordings, Mainstage, Armada, Spinnin' Records
- Website: www.maestroharrell.com

Maestro Harrell, also known as M A E S T R O (born July 29, 1991), is an American DJ, singer, rapper, actor, and record producer. He appeared on the HBO original series The Wire as Randy Wagstaff (2006–08), and on the ABC comedy Suburgatory as Malik.

== Early life and career ==
Harrell was born in Chicago. He was the recipient of The Most Talented Child Under Twelve Years Old at the Chicago Music Awards in 1999, 2000, and 2001. In 2005, Harrell performed at the grand opening ceremony for Disneyland in Hong Kong. He signed a recording deal with So So Def/Island Def Jam with hip-hop producer Jermaine Dupri.

Starting at the age of 7, Harrell made appearances on television shows such as The Tonight Show with Jay Leno and The Maury Povich and other TV shows. Serving as the spokesperson for Western Union's Study Buddy Reading Program enabled him to travel around the United States performing at schools and delivering motivational speeches to encourage students to read, as well as singing numerous jingles. He had a lead role in the television comedy series Guys Like Us but the series was cancelled after one season. Harrell has appeared in several television commercials.

Harrell made his motion picture film debut in the movie Ali, which was directed by Michael Mann. He portrayed the young Cassius Clay, and the all-star cast included Will Smith, Jamie Foxx and Jon Voight. He was in Barbershop and the film The Promotion. One of his most known roles is in The Wire as Randy Wagstaff.

Harrell's voice is featured on the Twilight Zone episodes DVD, along with Blair Underwood. Harrell starred in ABC's production of the PGA Tour Western Open with Tiger Woods and other pro-golfers. In 2003, Maestro was selected to play Young Simba in the Chicago production of Disney's The Lion King.

Harrell had a recurring role as the character Malik LeFrique on the ABC sitcom Suburgatory, which ran from 2011 to 2014.

In 2011, he started producing music. His first record was a remix to DJ Ruckus' single "Soul Soldier". In 2014, he started a career as a music producer and DJ. His first solo single developed as a collaboration with Antoine Becks, who has a career as an actor as well. "Drop It" contains many characteristics of the big-room-genre, which was somewhat popular at that time. "Drop It" was the title, released on German label Kontor Records.

In 2015, Maestro was cast to the role of Matt Sale in AMC's Fear The Walking Dead.

His break through in the EDM scene was finally done in 2015 with the progressive-house track "For You", a collaboration with Dzeko & Torres and singer-duo Delora. Later in 2015 he was signed to W&W's label "Mainstage Music", where he got much attention for his track "Olympus" as well as his collaboration "Poseidon" with Maurice West. One year later he changed his style with a jungle-terror-crossover track called "Zantar", which was produced together with newcomer NoTech.

In early 2018, Maestro released his self-produced song "Which One Which" which would later be featured in The First Purge. A week later, he released a follow-up track titled "Woke up". Later that year, M A E S T R O released his self-produced debut EP WAV GOD.

Harrell's song with David Gemmill Crystals was featured in the animated superhero musical-comedy film Teen Titans Go! To the Movies later that year.

In September 2019, M A E S T R O released a follow-up to his debut EP titled "WAV GOD 2".

== Filmography ==
Film
Year	Title	Role	Notes
2001	Ali	Young Cassius Clay	
2002	Barbershop	Tillman	
2008	The Promotion	First Kid in Parking Lot	
2009	Lowering the Bar	Pimp D	Short film
2010	Polish Bar	Dawan	Short film
2014	Dark Summer	Kevin Dowdle	
2015	Some Kind of Hate	Willie	
2015	Bone Tomahawk	Gizzard	
2019	Thriller	Ronnie DeBerry	
2019	John Henry	Young Hell	
2020	Dinner Party		Short film
2020	Loco	Jason	
2024	Mufasa: The Lion King	Inaki	(voice)

Television
Year	Title	Role	Notes
1997	Meego	Marcus	Episode: "Magic Parker"
1998–99	Guys Like Us	Maestro Harris	Main role: 13 episodes
2007	ER	Todd	Episode: "Lights Out"
2007	Cold Case	Terrance Carter	Episode: "Wunderkind"
2006–08	The Wire	Randy Wagstaff	Main cast (season 4); guest cast (season 5): 14 episodes
2008	Gifted Hands: The Ben Carson Story	Joe - Teen	Television movie
2010	Team Spitz	Tye	Television movie
2010	Meet the Browns	Antonio	Episodes: "Meet the Boyfriend", "Meet the Big Wedding"
2010	Lie to Me	Tyrel	Episode: "Delinquent"
2011	The Protector	Tagger	Episode: "Revisions"
2012	CSI: NY	Morris Davis	Episode: "Unwrapped"
2013	The Soul Man	Young parishioner	Episode (#2.5): "The Punching Preacher"
2011–14	Suburgatory	Malik LeFrique	Recurring role: 30 episodes
2014	Young & Hungry	Derek	Episode (#1.9): "Young & Getting Played"
2015	Fear the Walking Dead	Matt	Recurring role: 2 episodes
2015	Drunk History	Louis Armstrong	Episode: "New Orleans"
2016	House of Lies	J.R.	Episode: "Creative Destruction Phenomenon"
2017	American Koko	Teen Boy #1	Recurring role: 3 episodes
2018	Unsolved: The Murders of Tupac and the Notorious B.I.G.	James 'Lil' Cease' Lloyd	Recurring role: 5 episodes
2019	Adam Ruins Everything	Tre	Episode: "Adam Ruins a Sitcom"
2020	FBI	Big Trey	Episode: "Studio Gangster"
2026	The Lincoln Lawyer	Rashad Harrison	Episode (#4.7): "Honor Among Thieves"

== Discography ==
=== Album ===
2018:

- WAV GOD - EP

2019:

- WAV GOD VOL. 2

=== Singles ===
2014:

- Drop It (with Antoine Becks)

2015:

- For You (with Dzeko & Torres featuring Delora)(Club Life, Vol. 4 - New York City)
- Higher (with Antoine Becks featuring Sherry St. Germain)
- Olympus

2016:

- Boa (with Arcando)
- True (featuring Posso)
- Poseidon (with Maurice West)
- Siren
- Zantar (with NoTech)

2017:

- Pandemik
- Hear Me
- I Don't Care
- Luv Me (featuring Alyxx Dione)
- What U Wanna
- We Rage (DJ Ruckus, Maestro Harrell, Jermaine Dupri)

2018:

- 6Figga
- She Wanna (ft. Rich The Kid)
- Woke Up
- Which One Which
- Crystals (David Gemmill & M A E S T R O)
- Symphony (with Olly James)

2019:

- Stay FLYY
- 2 For 1
- IN MY BAG
- U & I
- MILLION
- MAD AT U
- LOOKING GOOD
- SOUL FOOD (Maestro Harrell, M A E S T R O)
- HYDE PARK (Maestro Harrell, M A E S T R O)
- MIDWAY (Maestro Harrell, M A E S T R O)

2020:

- Quarantine (Maestro Harrell, M A E S T R O)

=== Remixes ===
2011:

- DJ Ruckus featuring Mannequim - Soul Soldier (Maestro Harrell Remix)

2015:

- A&G and Northmark featuring Gabrielle Ross - Run With Me (Maestro Harrell Remix)

2016:

- Tiësto vs. Diplo - C'mon (Maestro Harrell 2016 Remix)

2017:

- Dash Berlin feat. Do - Heaven (Maestro Harrell Remix)
