= Graham Skipper =

American film actor, director, and screenwriter

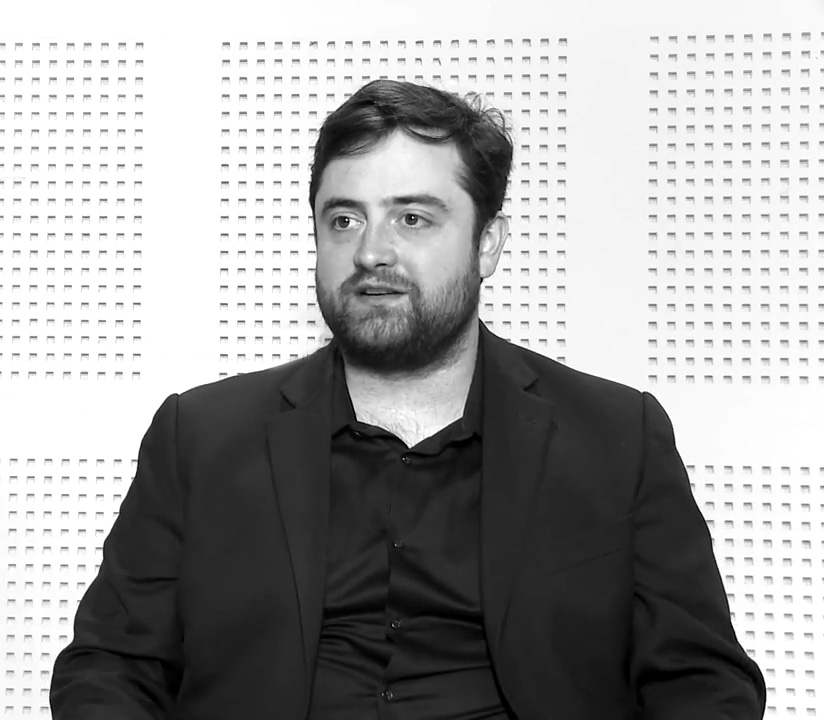
- Born: March 14, 1983 (age 43); Fort Worth, Texas, U.S.
- Occupations: Actor; director; producer; screenwriter
- Years active: 1996–present

Graham Skipper is an American actor, director and screenwriter. He is best known for his roles as Herbert West in Re-Animator: The Musical, Seth Hampton in Almost Human, Zack Connors in The Mind's Eye, Gordon Hardesty in Beyond the Gates and for writing and directing the horror film Sequence Break.

== Life and career ==
Graham was born and raised in Fort Worth, Texas. He studied theatre at Fordham University, New York. He is a founding member of the comedy troupe FUCT. In 2011, he moved to Los Angeles for Stuart Gordon's stage adaptation of Re-Animator: The Musical.

In 2017, his horror film Sequence Break, premiered at Fantasia International Film Festival, Chattanooga Film Festival and London FrightFest Film Festival. It also won Best Feature at the Chattanooga Film Festival.

== Filmography ==
Year	Film				
Year	Film	Director	Writer	Producer	Notes
2013	Scratches	Yes	Yes	Yes	Short film
2015	The Engagement Party	No	Yes	No	Television film
2015	The Mind's Eye	No	No	Yes	
2016	Space Clown	Yes	Yes	Yes	
2017	Sequence Break	Yes	Yes	Yes	
2019	Bliss	No	No	Yes	

As actor

Year	Title	Role	Notes
1996	Late Bloomers	Avery Lumpkin	
2012	The Boring Life of Jacqueline	Russian Bath Customer	
2012	Story of the Eye	Georges	
2013	Almost Human	Seth Hampton	
2013	Criminal Minds	Danny Sterling	
2013	The Cartridge Family	Sergio	
2013	Sex Boss	Graham	
2013	Scratches	Jake	
2014	Suck It	Graham	
2015	The Engagement Party	Ben Irwin	
2015	The Resort	Peter	
2015	20 Seconds to Live	Magician	
2015	Tales of Halloween	Cop / Hellman	
2015	Balloon	Climber	
2015	The Mind's Eye	Zack Connors	
2015	Dementia	Hendricks	
2016	Carnage Park	Peter W	
2016	The Devil's Dolls	Officer Doyle	
2016	Friends Effing Friends Effing Friends	Steve	
2016	Audition Girl	Sean	
2016	Beyond the Gates	Gordon Hardesty	
2016	Feeding Time	Dale	
2016	Space Clown	Graham	
2017	Downrange	Deputy	
2018	Bad Apples	Robert	
2015–2018	Suspense	H.P. Lovecraft / Fred Bancroft / Van Meter	
2018	All the Creatures Were Stirring	Max	
2018	Dementia Part II		
2019	Bliss	Hadrian	
2019	In Search of Darkness	Himself	Documentary film
2019	VFW (film)	Roadie	
2022	Christmas Bloody Christmas	Mike	
2023	Suitable Flesh	Pathologist	
2025	Man Finds Tape	Winston Boon	
