= Some Kind of Hate (film) =

2015 film directed by Adam Egypt Mortimer

- Film poster
- Directed by: Adam Egypt Mortimer
- Written by: Brian DeLeeuw; Adam Egypt Mortimer
- Produced by: Dallas Sonnier; Jack Heller; Amanda Mortimer; Gabriela Revilla Lugo
- Starring: Ronen Rubinstein; Grace Phipps; Maestro Harrell; Lexi Atkins; Sierra McCormick; Noah Segan; Brando Eaton; Spencer Breslin; Michael Polish
- Cinematography: Benji Bakshi
- Edited by: Josh Ethier
- Music by: Robert Allaire
- Production companies: Caliber Media Company; Revek Entertainment
- Distributed by: RLJ Entertainment
- Release dates: May 2, 2015 (Stanley Film Festival); September 18, 2015 (United States)
- Running time: 82 minutes
- Country: United States
- Language: English
- Budget: $200,000

Some Kind of Hate is a 2015 supernatural slasher film directed by Adam Egypt Mortimer in his directorial debut. Mortimer co-wrote the script with Brian Deleeuw. It stars Ronen Rubinstein, Grace Phipps, Sierra McCormick and Spencer Breslin. Some Kind of Hate premiered at the Stanley Film Festival in May 2015 before releasing theatrically on September 18, 2015, by RLJ Entertainment.

== Plot ==
Troubled teenager Lincoln Taggert is sent to Mind’s Eye Academy reform camp after stabbing a bully in the face with a fork. Former students Krauss and Christine assist head guru Jack Iverson with teaching at the New Age disciplinary camp. Isaac is assigned as Lincoln’s roommate and the two boys become friends. Kaitlin takes a romantic interest in Lincoln.

Following a fight with camp bully Willie, Lincoln wishes his tormenters were dead. He hears a girl’s voice as blood begins dripping from the ceiling. Willie is attacked by a ghostly girl. Kaitlin finds Willie dead from apparent self-inflicted wounds, along with the word “bully” carved into his arm. Lincoln begins seeing visions of the ghost and learns that her name is Moira.

Moira attacks Willie’s sidekick Derek. Isaac’s research reveals that the girl is Moira Karp, a bullied teenager who supposedly killed herself while attending Mind’s Eye Academy. Lincoln pleads with Moira to stop, but Moira counters that she is only doing what Lincoln wanted. Moira is able to harm others by harming herself; when she slits her own throat, Derek dies from the wound.

Lincoln is upset when Kaitlin confesses that she used to be a bully who regrettably drove a classmate to suicide. Moira tells Lincoln that his anger brought her back and together their vengeance can be unstoppable. When Lincoln tells Moira that he doesn’t need her anymore, Moira’s skin bubbles with blood and she doubles over in pain. She flees screaming.

Moira cuts herself so that Kaitlin can experience the pain. The sheriff is supernaturally killed. Moira confronts Iverson, who says that Moira gave them no choice before hitting her over the head. However, the wound appears on Iverson’s head instead and he collapses. Moira breaks her teeth on a rock to further torture Iverson.

Krauss tries leaving, but discovers that Kaitlin slashed his tires. Moira kills Krauss, then bashes her head to kill Isaac. Christine confronts Lincoln at gunpoint over presumably murdering Willie and restrains him to a faucet. Kaitlin finds Moira cutting fellow student Samantha. She protests Samantha’s innocence in the bullying, but Moira continues torturing the girl. Kaitlin angrily insists that she no longer needs Moira.

Moira confronts Christine about lying to her parents regarding how she actually died. It is revealed that Christine actually killed her. Krauss and Iverson were witnesses who aided with the suicide cover-up. Christine shoots Moira but ends up blowing off her own head. Kaitlin professes her love to Lincoln and frees him. Together they confront Moira. When Moira begins gaining the upper hand against Kaitlin, Lincoln sets himself on fire to kill Moira. Kaitlin puts out the flames on Lincoln’s dead body and angrily uses the fire extinguisher to bash in Moira’s head.

In a mid-credits scene, a young girl in a high school bathroom wishes for her tormenters be dead, inadvertently summoning Moira.

== Cast ==
- Ronen Rubinstein as Lincoln Taggert
- Grace Phipps as Kaitlin
- Maestro Harrell as Willie
- Lexi Atkins as Christine
- Sierra McCormick as Moira
- Noah Segan as Krauss
- Brando Eaton as Derek
- Spencer Breslin as Isaac
- Michael Polish as Jack Iverson
- Andrew Bryniarski as Lincoln's Father
- Justin Prentice as Jim Greene
- Jeremy "JHawk" Hawkins as Bud
- Jasper Polish as Samantha
- Matt Beene as Eric
- Josh Ethier as Driver
- Dave Reeves as Sheriff
- Imani Hakim as Jacqueline

== Production ==
=== Development ===
While writing an adaptation of Brian DeLeeuw's In This Way I Was Saved in 2011, Adam Egypt Mortimer and DeLeeuw sidelined the project temporarily in order for Mortimer to gain experience as a filmmaker. They began work on Some Kind of Hate the following year. Mortimer and DeLeeuw set out to combine the slasher genre with indie drama. A Nightmare on Elm Street, Carrie and Let the Right One In were used as inspiration during the writing process.

=== Pre-production ===
In April 2014, Some Kind of Hate was officially announced along with the castings of Ronen Rubinstein, Grace Phipps, Sierra McCormick, Lexi Atkins, Maestro Harrell, Noah Segan, Michael Polish, Jasper Polish, Spencer Breslin, Brando Eaton and Jeremy Hawkins. Dallas Sonnier and Jack Heller of Caliber Media signed on to produce the film alongside Amanda Mortimer and Revek Entertainment's Gabriela Revilla. The casting of A.N.T Farm star McCormick, who was hired at the "last minute", was used to draw in her younger fanbase, as Mortimer wanted to create "the first intense horror movie experience that some of these kids will ever have". Mortimer had met with Hannah Marks for an undisclosed role, but would later cast her in his follow-up film Daniel Isn't Real.

=== Filming ===
Production began in Los Angeles and Castaic, California in April 2014.

Filming was at one point slated to begin in Vancouver in summer 2013 with a budget of $2 million. An entire crew and cast of different actors were assembled, however, the money never came through. Mortimer moved to Washington in the meantime while production was stalled. Eventually Mortimer and his team went back to California to make the film.

== Release ==
Some Kind of Hate debuted at the Stanley Film Festival on May 2, 2015. The film was released on September 18, 2015, by RLJ Entertainment.

=== Home media ===
The film was released on blu-ray and DVD on November 3, 2015.

== Reception ==
On review aggregator Rotten Tomatoes, Some Kind of Hate holds an approval rating of 38% based on 21 reviews, with an average rating of 4.57/10. On Metacritic, the film holds an average score of 28 out of 100 based on 5 reviews, indicating "generally unfavorable reviews".

Scott Weinberg of Nerdist called the film "brutal, disturbing, and sometimes tragic, but it’s also a pointed, angry film that has a lot to say about the nature of “psychological predators” and their victims." For Bloody Disgusting, Mike Wilson said "Some Kind Of Hate deserves more praise than complaint, however. The acting is largely well done, and the script by Mortimer and DeLeeuw definitely attempt to give the characters more dimension than what you’d normally expect from a film like this."

Helen T. Verongos, writing for The New York Times said "Some Kind of Hate succeeds at being discomfiting" but that the film "fails to deliver a thrill". Nick Schager of The Village Voice wrote "Like so much teen-targeting modern horror, it opts for dull angsty brooding over the very sort of grim-and-gruesome sleaziness that might have made its premise interesting." For The Los Angeles Times, Gary Goldstein called the film a "convoluted slashfest".
