= Guys Like Us =

- Title card
- Genre: Sitcom
- Created by: Dan Schneider
- Written by: Temi Akinyemi; George Doty IV; Jeffrey Duteil; Andrew Hill Newman; Rich Kaplan; Rina Mimoun; Barry O'Brien; Dan Schneider
- Directed by: Scott Baio; Rich Correll; Lillah McCarty; Jonathan Prince; Joel Zwick
- Starring: Bumper Robinson; Maestro Harrell; Chris Hardwick; Karen Maruyama
- Composer: Howard Pearl
- Country of origin: United States
- Original language: English
- No. of seasons: 1
- No. of episodes: 13 (1 unaired)

Production
- Executive producers: David W. Duclon; Barry O'Brien; Dan Schneider
- Producers: Patricia Fass Palmer; Roxie Wenk Evans
- Running time: 22 minutes
- Production company: Columbia TriStar Television

Original release
- Network: UPN
- Release: October 5, 1998 – January 18, 1999

Guys Like Us is an American sitcom created by Dan Schneider for the UPN channel. The series was produced by Columbia TriStar Television and aired from October 5, 1998, to January 18, 1999, and it starred Bumper Robinson, Maestro Harrell, and Chris Hardwick. The show was designed with the goal of being a launching vehicle for Maestro Harrell, who would later gain fame for his role as Randy Wagstaff on the HBO show The Wire.

== Synopsis ==
The series is centered around bachelors Sean Barker (Hardwick) and Jared Harris (Robinson), and Jared's six-year-old brother Maestro (Maestro Harrell), who comes to live with them after Jared's father accepts a freelance position overseas. Now the two bachelors must give up some of their perks to develop their crude parenting skills.

The show's premise, in which a younger sibling moves in with their older sibling after a parent gets a job overseas, would later be applied to the premise of two other sitcoms created by Dan Schneider, The WB sitcom What I Like About You and the Nickelodeon series iCarly.

== Timeslot ==
The first four episodes aired on Mondays at 8 p.m. and then starting with the fifth episode the remaining episodes aired at 8:30 p.m. on Mondays, however the series finale never aired.

== Cancellation ==
Due to low ratings, UPN cancelled the show after its first season.

== Cast ==
=== Main ===
- Chris Hardwick as Sean Barker
- Bumper Robinson as Jared Harris
- Maestro Harrell as Maestro Harris
- Karen Maruyama as Kim

=== Recurring ===
- Linda Cardellini as Jude

== Episodes ==
No.	Title	Directed by	Original release date	Prod. code	US viewers (millions)
1	"Pilot"	Rich Correll	October 5, 1998	100	2.07
Maestro's suave, career-minded older brother Jared must break the news of the "arrangement" to his carefree, aspiring musician roommate Sean. Needless to say, Sean is less than thrilled with the news that a six-year-old child is his new roommate and questions the impact Maestro's presence might have on his sex life. But it's not long before Sean realizes Maestro's "babe magnet" potential, and he quickly learns to use his adorable pint-sized roomie's charm and wit to his advantage.
2	"In & Out"	Joel Zwick	October 12, 1998	101	2.44
When a gorgeous young woman moves into the guys' apartment building, Sean is instantly smitten and offers a neighborly hand in getting her settled. The two begin spending time together, leading Sean to believe that he's "so in there." But Kara doesn't like Sean because he's "in", but rather because he's "out"—of the closet, that is. She's mistaken Sean and Jared for a gay couple raising a child.
3	"Maestro's First Crush"	Dan Schneider	October 19, 1998	104	2.38
Maestro develops a big crush on his babysitter Katie, a precocious 13-year-old who's more impressed with older musicians, especially Sean. Meanwhile, Jared tries to learn golf to impress his boss Mr. Levin, who happens to be Katie's father.
4	"It's Halloween" "It's the Great Pumpkin, Maestro Harris"	Jonathan Prince	October 26, 1998	106	2.17
When Maestro lands the lead role of Peter Pumpkin in his school's annual "parents please participate" Halloween pageant, he assumes that his big brother Jared will play Papa Pumpkin to his Peter. But Jared's on the verge of a promotion at work and must choose between climbing the corporate ladder or upholding a commitment to family.
5	"Sean's Moving Out"	Joel Zwick	November 2, 1998	102	2.33
Sean announces he's moving out after his band loses a gig because having to baby-sit Maestro prevented them from recording an important demo tape. Meanwhile, Jared's having his own problems at the office, developing an acceptable marketing pitch.
6	"Maestro's Big Break"	Scott Baio	November 9, 1998	107	2.32
When Jared agrees to let Maestro star in a new "Daka" national sportswear commercial, Sean volunteers to supervise Maestro on the job so that he can convince the director to use his band's music for the commercial. But Jared, trying to make quality time for his out-of-town girlfriend, sees Maestro and Sean having too much fun together and feels left out.
7	"The Lying Down Game"	Jonathan Prince	November 16, 1998	109	2.20
When Maestro asks questions about "the birds and the bees", Jared and Sean pore through books on how to communicate with children then each take a stab at answering some of the seven-year-old's question's—but only succeed in confusing him more.
8	"A Turkey Too Far"	Jonathan Prince	November 23, 1998	108	2.44
Jared and Maestro plan to observe Thanksgiving eating pizza and watching football—until the kid learns that his teacher is spending the holiday alone, and invites her to join them. While Jared and Sean clumsily scramble to cook a traditional turkey dinner for their guest, Maestro searches for the true meaning of the holiday.
9	"Truth or Consequences"	Rich Correll	December 21, 1998	110	2.20
To prove to Jared that women love foreign men, Sean does his best Scottish impression for Audrey, a woman he notices at the bar. To everyone's surprise, including Sean's, Audrey falls for the Scotsman bit and their relationship blossoms. That is, until Sean's co-worker Jude introduces them to Gavin—her real Scottish friend.
10	"Maestro's Gold Card"	Jonathan Prince	January 4, 1999	105	2.36
Maestro and Nikki get into all kinds of trouble when they go on an on-line shopping spree with a gold credit card that came in the mail. The two have good intentions when they purchase gifts to cheer up Jared and Sean (including hundreds of copies of Sean's non-selling "Rock the Hat!" CD), but they end up learning a lesson in responsibility.
11	"Jared's Ex"	Joel Zwick	January 11, 1999	103	1.65
Sean and Jared both lose trust in each other when Jared's ex-girlfriend, Jennifer, shows up and begins dating Sean. Later she makes a move on Jared, but luckily, Maestro captures Jennifer's deviousness on videotape and it becomes clear that she is only using Sean to get back with Jared.
12	"The Good Old Days"	Lillah McCarthy	January 18, 1999	111	2.28
Jared and Sean are psyched to see their old college buddy, Steve "The Fig" Figgison, but are quickly stunned when their favorite party guy rolls into town with some big news: he's settling down and getting married. However, it only takes one night out on the town for Steve to call off his wedding and question whether or not he'd make a good parent. Sean and Jared know Steve's making a big mistake so they set out to set him straight.
13	"Friends & Lovers"	Scott Baio	Unaired	112	N/A

== Awards and nominations ==
Year	Award	Category	Recipient	Result
2006	Young Artist Awards	Best Performance in a TV Comedy Series – Supporting Young Actor	Maestro Harrell	Nominated
2006	Young Artist Awards	Best Performance in a TV Comedy Series - Supporting Young Actress	Courtney Mun	Nominated
