= Pathetic Fallacy (film) =

2026 film by Adam Egypt Mortimer

- Festival poster
- Directed by: Adam Egypt Mortimer
- Written by: Andrew Barrer; Gabriel Ferrari
- Produced by: Steven Schneider; K. Asher Levin; Ronnie Exley; Adam Egypt Mortimer; Karina Manashill; Aria Moffly; Ashleigh Snead (Note: Credited as Ahleigh Snead on the film's poster); Chris Wilkinson; Ryan Marchant
- Starring: Scott Mescudi; Jessica Rothe; Travis Fimmel; Natasha Lyonne
- Cinematography: Chuk Owens
- Edited by: Vera Drew
- Music by: Johnny Jewel
- Production companies: Still Point Pictures; Rabbits Black; Spooky Pictures; Hadron Films; Destroy All Lovesick Pictures; Mad Solar Productions
- Release date: September 20, 2026 (Fantastic Fest)
- Running time: 98 minutes
- Country: United States
- Language: English

Pathetic Fallacy is a 2026 American romantic musical horror film directed by Adam Egypt Mortimer and written by Andrew Barrer and Gabriel Ferrari. The film stars Scott Mescudi and Jessica Rothe, who are both credited as executive producers, along with Travis Fimmel and Natasha Lyonne appearing in supporting roles.

Pathetic Fallacy premiered at Fantastic Fest on September 20, 2026.

== Synopsis ==
When Iris dies from an illness, Asher travels to the New Age Mount Samdi in an effort to reconnect with her.

== Cast ==
- Scott Mescudi as Asher
- Jessica Rothe as Iris
- Travis Fimmel as Doyle, a serial killer
- Natasha Lyonne as the voice of a spider
- Richard Harmon as Shai
- Jess Brown as Pia
- James Pizzinato as Ray
- Doralynn Mui as Her
- Amitai Marmorstein as Him

Deborah Ramsay as Old Iris Filmmakers Justin Benson and Aaron Moorhead make vocal appearances as animals, as does the film's editor Vera Drew.

== Production ==
=== Development ===
Screenwriters Andrew Barrer and Gabriel Ferrari had a seventy-five page draft of Pathetic Fallacy that was eventually sent over to Adam Egypt Mortimer in 2022. Mortimer, inspired by Pink Floyd - The Wall and Jesus Christ Superstar, incorporated the musical elements into the script.

=== Filming ===
Production commenced in Vancouver, British Columbia in early June 2025 with Chuk Owens serving as director of photography, shooting on 35 mm film, and wrapped in August.

== Release ==
Pathetic Fallacy had its world premiere at Fantastic Fest in Austin, Texas on September 20, 2026.

== Reception ==
On the review aggregator website Rotten Tomatoes, 100% of 12 critics' reviews are positive, with an average rating of 8.4/10.

Meagan Navarro of Bloody Disgusting praised Mescudi and Rothe's performances as "achingly raw" and Mortimer's direction as "mesmeric". Kat Hughes of The Hollywood News called Pathetic Fallacy "a stunner" and highlighted the music as the film's "beating heart". Writing for Daily Dead, Matt Donato described the film as an "unwieldy fever dream" and as Mortimer's best work. For RogerEbert.com, Brian Tallerico wrote "to say that Pathetic Fallacy was like nothing else at Fantastic Fest would be an understatement. It’s like nothing else anywhere."
