= The Mind's Eye (film) =

- Theatrical release poster
- Directed by: Joe Begos
- Written by: Joe Begos
- Produced by: Joe Begos; Josh Ethier; Graham Skipper; Zak Zeman
- Starring: Graham Skipper; Lauren Ashley Carter; John Speredakos; Larry Fessenden; Noah Segan; Matt Mercer
- Cinematography: Joe Begos
- Edited by: Josh Ethier
- Music by: Steve Moore
- Production companies: Channel 83 Films; Site B
- Distributed by: RLJ Entertainment
- Release dates: September 15, 2015 (TIFF); August 5, 2016 (United States)
- Running time: 87 minutes
- Country: United States
- Language: English

The Mind's Eye is a 2015 American science fiction horror film written and directed by Joe Begos. The film stars Graham Skipper, Lauren Ashley Carter, John Speredakos, Larry Fessenden, Noah Segan and Matt Mercer. The film was released on August 5, 2016, by RLJ Entertainment.

== Cast ==
- Graham Skipper as Zack Connors
- Lauren Ashley Carter as Rachel Meadows
- John Speredakos as Dr. Michael Slovak
- Larry Fessenden as Mike Connors
- Noah Segan as Travis Levine
- Matt Mercer as David Armstrong
- Michael A. LoCicero as Kurt Thompson
- Jeremy Gardner as Vince
- Patrick M. Walsh as Officer Rayne
- Brian Morvant as Tommy
- Josh Ethier as Jim Robbins
- Susan T. Travers as Nurse Potter
- Chuck Doherty as Gary

== Release ==
The film premiered at the 2015 Toronto International Film Festival on September 15, 2015. The film was released on August 5, 2016, by RLJ Entertainment.

== Reception ==
The film has received mixed-to-positive reviews from critics and currently holds a 62% on the review aggregator Rotten Tomatoes with the consensus stating, "The Mind's Eye packs a bloody B-movie punch, although it's gleeful indulgence in gore may test the limits of all but the least squeamish".
