= Andrew Patterson (film director) =

American filmmaker (born 1982)

- Born: June 1982 (age 44); United States
- Occupation: Film director

Andrew Patterson (born June 1982) is an American filmmaker. His debut feature The Vast of Night won the Best Narrative Feature Audience Award at the 2019 Slamdance Film Festival. Patterson lives in Oklahoma.

== Career ==
Patterson's interest in film started during his sophomore year in high school, when he worked as a film projectionist. Later he formed a production company, GED Media, in Oklahoma City producing commercials as well as promo shorts for the Oklahoma City Thunder.

In 2016, Patterson started making his first feature film, which he financed himself, The Vast of Night. He also wrote the script under the pseudonym James Montague with Craig W. Sanger. After being rejected by 18 film festivals, it finally premiered at the 2019 Slamdance Film Festival where it won Best Narrative Feature Audience Award, followed by wide critical attention. The film was acquired by Amazon Studios, and released in drive-in cinemas on May 15, 2020, and on Amazon Prime on May 29. He has since made The Rivals of Amziah King, a revenge thriller set in the honeybee industry and starring Matthew McConaughey and Kurt Russell.

== Filmography ==
=== Film ===
Year	Title	Director	Writer	Producer	Notes
2019	The Vast of Night	Yes	Yes (Note: Credited as James Montague)	Yes	
2025	The Rivals of Amziah King	Yes	Yes	Yes	
