= Almost Human (2013 film) =

- Directed by: Joe Begos
- Written by: Joe Begos
- Produced by: Anthony Ambrosino; Joe Begos; Josh Ethier
- Starring: Graham Skipper; Josh Ethier; Vanessa Leigh
- Cinematography: Joe Begos
- Edited by: Josh Ethier
- Music by: Andy Garfield
- Production companies: Channel 83 Films; Ambrosino / Delmenico
- Distributed by: IFC Midnight
- Release dates: September 10, 2013 (Toronto International Film Festival); February 21, 2014 (United States)
- Running time: 80 minutes
- Country: United States
- Language: English
- Budget: $50,000

Almost Human is a 2013 science fiction horror film directed by Joe Begos. His feature film directorial debut, it premiered on September 10, 2013 at the Toronto International Film Festival and stars Graham Skipper as a man whose best friend may or may not be committing a series of horrific murders.

== Premise ==
Two years ago Mark (Josh Ethier) was kidnapped and taken to parts unknown. Upon his return Mark's personality is completely changed. His friends Seth (Graham Skipper) and Jen (Vanessa Leigh) decide to investigate Mark's mysterious disappearance and re-appearance, but are soon met with a series of grisly murders. It becomes clear that Mark has become infected by a bloodthirsty alien parasite that is bent on destroying the world. Seth is the first to know when he notices there is something wrong with him. Jen is assaulted by Mark, who shows her through a psychic link that he was tortured. Seth must do everything he can before it's too late.

== Cast ==
- Graham Skipper as Seth Hampton
- Josh Ethier as Mark Fisher
- Vanessa Leigh as Jen Craven
- Susan T. Travers as Becky
- Anthony Amaral III as Clyde Dutton
- Michael A. LoCicero as Barry
- Jeremy Furtado as Gas Station Customer
- Jami Tennille as Tracy
- Chuck Doherty as Clancy
- Kristopher Avedisian as Hunter 1
- David Langill as Hunter 2
- John Palmer as Jimmy
- Andre Boudreau as Car Driver
- Eric Berghman as Earle Harris
- Mark O'Leary as Dale

== Production ==
Joe Begos had starting writing the film with the lead roles written for Graham Skipper and Josh Ethier. Begos knew Skipper from Re-Animator: The Musical, while Ethier had known Begos since childhood. Actress Vanessa Leigh signed on to star in the film six days before production began. The film was shot entirely in Rhode Island.

== Release ==
Almost Human debuted at the Toronto International Film Festival on September 10, 2013. The film was released on February 21, 2014 by IFC Midnight.

== Reception ==
Critical reception for Almost Human has been mixed. On review aggregator Rotten Tomatoes, Almost Human holds a 45% approval rating based on 22 reviews, with an average rating of 5.50/10. The critical consensus reads "Almost Human lands with an impressively grisly B-movie splatter, but a fatally flawed screenplay undermines much of its impact." On Metacritic, the film holds an average score of 40 out of 100 based on 6reviews, indicating "mixed or average" reviews.

The Torontoist rated the film at 3 1/2 stars out of 5. Much of the criticism centered on issues that Fearnet's Scott Weinberg considered "'first-timer' problems", such as the movie's acting, repetition, and slowness in the second act. However, as a whole the reviewers generally enjoyed the film and believed that Begos did show future potential. In contrast, ReelFilm was more critical of the film and stated that while it had a "watchable vibe", the movie "squandered the promise of its setup to become just another generic, shot-on-a-shoestring horror effort."
