= Christmas Bloody Christmas =

- Theatrical release poster
- Directed by: Joe Begos
- Written by: Joe Begos
- Produced by: Joe Begos; Josh Ethier
- Starring: Riley Dandy; Sam Delich; Jonah Ray Rodrigues; Dora Madison; Jeremy Gardner; Jeff Daniel; Abraham Benrubi
- Cinematography: Brian Sowell
- Edited by: Josh Ethier
- Music by: Steve Moore
- Production company: Channel 83 Films
- Distributed by: Shudder
- Release date: December 9, 2022
- Running time: 87 minutes
- Country: United States
- Language: English
- Box office: $251,586

Christmas Bloody Christmas is a 2022 American Christmas slasher film directed and written by Joe Begos. It follows a robotic Santa Claus (Abraham Benrubi) who goes on a killing spree on Christmas Eve. Riley Dandy, Sam Delich, Jonah Ray Rodrigues, Dora Madison, Jeremy Gardner, Jeff Daniel, and Kansas Bowling also star. The film was released on December 9, 2022 and it received mixed reviews from critics.

== Plot ==
The film starts with vignettes that resemble the typical Christmas advertisements, along with a news flash regarding a robotic Santa Claus that's been recalled because of a certain malfunction that reverts it to its original programming from the US Defense Department.

Record store owner Tori Tooms closes up her store for Christmas Eve night with her employee Robbie Reynolds. Robbie, who is attracted to Tori, convinces her to cancel a date from Tinder and go out drinking with him. The pair meet with their friends Jay and Lahna, who work at a nearby Toy store that is equipped with one of the defective Santa Clauses. The group drinks and hangs out before Tori and Robbie leave to go to a bar. The robot Santa malfunctions and becomes a violent killing machine, murdering Jay and Lahna while they have sex.

Charmed by Robbie, Tori invites him back to her house, unaware that they are being stalked by the robot Santa. They arrive at Tori's house and continue to flirt before finally having sex. Meanwhile, the robot Santa breaks into Tori's neighbors' house and slaughters a couple and their son, with Tori witnessing the boy's murder. As she panics and warns Robbie, she notices the robot Santa has spotted her. Tori wakes up her sister Liddy and Liddy's husband Mike and attempts to escape the house with them and Robbie. The robot Santa attacks the group, killing Liddy and Mike while Tori and Robbie escape into Robbie's car. As they attempt to drive away, they find themselves blocked by another one of Tori's neighbors, who is quickly killed by robot Santa. Unable to escape, Robbie is dragged out and killed by the robot Santa.

A responding police officer arrives and manages to gun down the robot Santa for a moment before the robot Santa recovers and kills the officer. Tori runs over the robot Santa with the officer's car and drives away, where she stumbles across more officers and an ambulance responding to the scene. Tori flags them down to help and tells them of the officer's death, and is arrested by Sheriff Monroe. Back at the police station, Tori struggles to convince Monroe about the robot Santa. The robot Santa returns, having commandeered the ambulance, and attacks the station, killing Monroe and his partner, Smith. Tori retrieves a shotgun and fends off the robot Santa. She drives away in the ambulance, where the robot Santa climbs on board, and Tori crashes. Tori uses the crash to set the robot Santa alight, severely damaging it.

Retreating to her record store, Tori is hunted by the robot Santa, which is now nearly fully stripped to its robotic endoskeleton. After being chased through the store and wounded, Tori sets a trashcan on fire to set off the sprinklers. The water short-circuits the robot Santa and causes it to explode, finally destroying it. An exhausted and bloody Tori leaves the store before collapsing onto the street outside as Christmas morning begins, and starts to laugh hysterically.

== Cast ==
- Riley Dandy as Tori Tooms
- Sam Delich as Robbie Reynolds
- Jonah Ray Rodrigues as Jay
- Dora Madison as Lahna
- Jeremy Gardner as Officer Bobby Smith
- Jeff Daniel Phillips as Sheriff Monroe
- Abraham Benrubi as Santa Claus
- Kansas Bowling as Liddy Tooms
- Graham Skipper as Mike
- Joe Begos as Benny
- Josh Ethier as Larry
- Adam Dietrich as Officer Weston
- Elliott Gilbert II as Officer Davies
- Coen McClure as Neighbor Child
- Matt Mercer as Neighbor Dad
- Aerial Washington as Neighbor Mom

== Development ==
Joe Begos came up with the idea for Christmas Bloody Christmas while pitching a remake of 1984's Silent Night, Deadly Night, suggesting that the murders could be perpetrated by a Terminator-esque android. The pitch was rejected for straying too far from the original film, however Begos continued developing the idea and wrote the movie script during the COVID-19 pandemic. Actor Abraham Benrubi was chosen to portray the killer Santa Claus as Begos did not want it performed by a stuntman due to the differences in physique. The movie was filmed in Los Angeles and Placerville, California.

== Release ==
Christmas Bloody Christmas had a limited theatrical release on December 9, 2022, alongside its streaming premiere on Shudder.

== Reception ==
=== Box office ===
The film made $139,932 from 301 theaters in its opening weekend.

=== Critical response ===
On Rotten Tomatoes, the film holds an approval rating of 78% (Certified Fresh) based on 47 reviews, with an average rating of 6.3/10. The site's critics consensus reads: "Perhaps it isn't quite as much fun as a movie about a murderous robot Santa ought to be, but for fans of holiday horror, Christmas Bloody Christmas is still a gift." Metacritic, which uses a weighted average, assigned the film a score of 46 out of 100, based on eight critics, indicating "mixed or average" reviews.
