= Adam Egypt Mortimer =

American film director

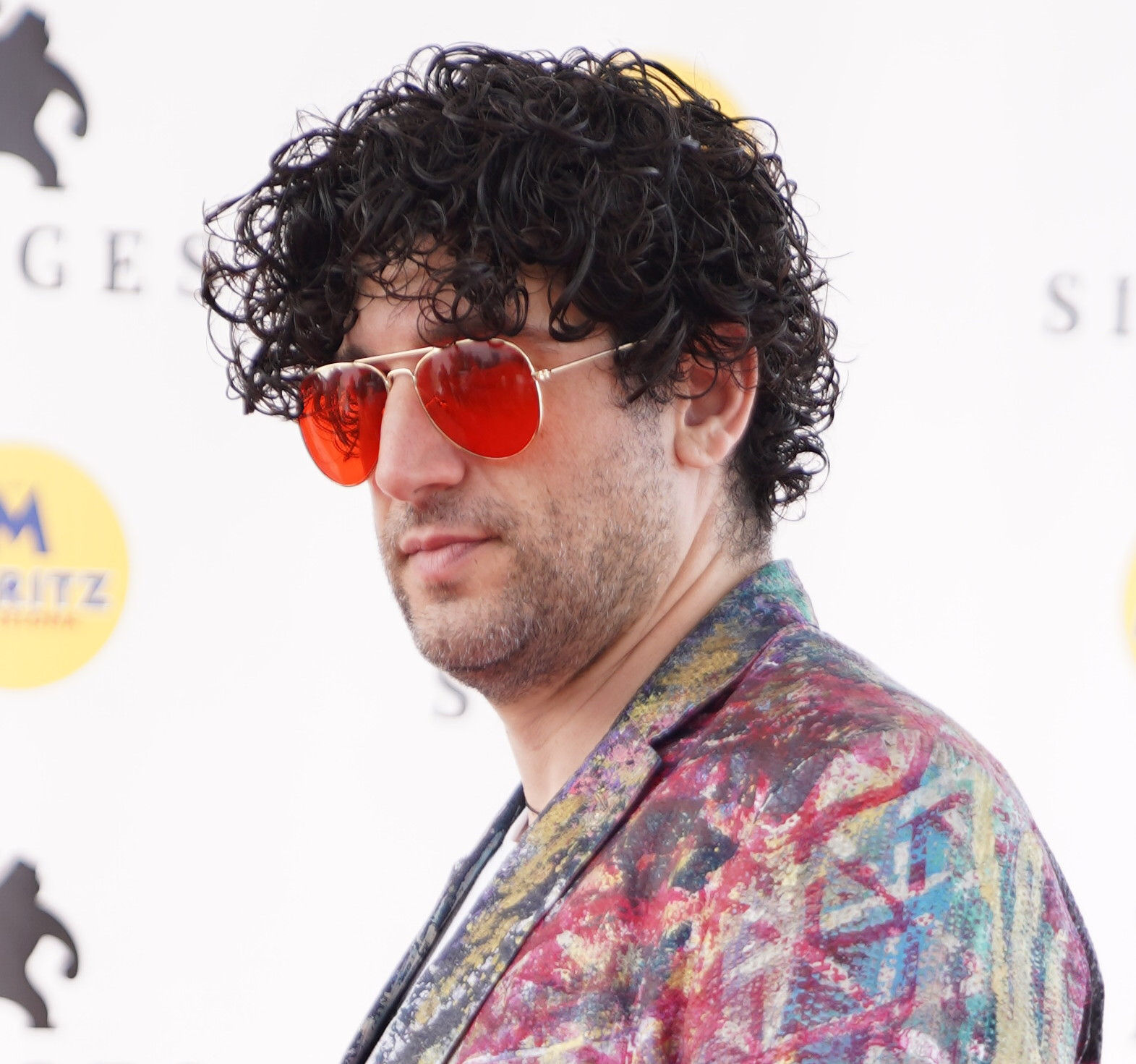
- Education: Columbia University (BA)
- Occupations: director, comic writer
- Notable work: Daniel Isn't Real and Archenemy

Adam Egypt Mortimer is an American director, comic writer, and producer known for directing Daniel Isn't Real and Archenemy.

== Biography ==
Mortimer is from Boston and graduated from Columbia University in 1995 as an English major. He was a musician before deciding to enter filmmaking. He began his filmmaking career in directing music videos, promos, and commercials for big companies, including a documentary series commissioned by Sprite named Jerk All-Stars.

Mortimer was briefly in the comic scene by co-writing a 5-issue series named BALLISTIC with comic illustrator Darick Robertson in 2013.

In 2015, he made his directorial debut with the horror movie Some Kind of Hate. He directed a segment of the 2016 horror anthology film Holidays.

He co-wrote and directed the film Daniel Isn't Real, which premiered at South by Southwest on March 29, 2019. The movie received generally favorable reviews from critics.

Mortimer's most recent film, Archenemy, premiered in 2020. He has currently wrapped filming on his next film, Pathetic Fallacy.

== Filmography ==
Year	Title	Director	Producer	Writer	Notes
2015	Some Kind of Hate	Yes	Yes	Yes	
2016	Holidays	Yes	Yes	No	Segment "New Year's Eve"
2019	Daniel Isn't Real	Yes	Yes	Yes	
2020	Archenemy	Yes	Yes	Yes	
2026	Pathetic Fallacy	Yes	No	Yes	

== Awards and nominations ==
Mortimer was nominated for two Fangoria Chainsaw Awards in 2020 and 2016, respectively, in the "Best Limited Release" category. He won the Best Director award for Daniel Isn't Real at the 2019 Brooklyn Horror Film Festival. He also won the Best Director Choice prize at the 2019 Bucheon International Fantastic Film Festival.
