= David Seals =

American novelist

- Born: April 29, 1947; Denver, Colorado, U.S.
- Died: February 12, 2017 (aged 69); Flagstaff, Arizona, U.S.
- Occupations: Novelist; author; screenwriter
- Writing career
- Genres: Allegory, Poetry

David Seals (April 29, 1947 – February 12, 2017) was an American writer.

== Education ==
Seals was a graduate of Wheelus High School in Tripoli, Libya. In 1968, he graduated from Western Colorado University.

== Publishing and film career ==
Seals wrote fiction, non-fiction, essays and plays. His 1979 novel, The Powwow Highway, was made into the film Powwow Highway, starring A. Martinez and Gary Farmer. It was produced by George Harrison's Handmade Films, and featured appearances by Wes Studi, Graham Greene, Seals' son, Sky Seals, and Seals' then-wife Irene Handren-Seals. Parts of the film were shot on location on the Northern Cheyenne Indian Reservation in Lame Deer, Montana, with a number of tribal members playing small roles in the film.

Along with fellow filmmakers William McIntyre and David Ode, Seals was a 1990 winner of the Bush Artists Fellowship from the Bush Foundation in Minneapolis for their 6-hour "poetic documentary" With Visible Breath I Am Walking.

His other published works included the novel Sweet Medicine, a sequel to The Powwow Highway which Booklist called "a comic masterpiece". In Sweet Medicine, the story continues where The Powwow Highway ended, but with the added device of the characters also commenting on the success of the previous book and film. In an ironic and self-deprecating incident, the protagonists have the chance to see the movie, but choose to see a Hollywood blockbuster instead. Later, they also encounter a commune of yuppie newagers, and are tempted with the promise of fame and money at the cost of choosing to sell out their vision. The New York Times described the book as "full of adventure, humor, love and sex, and occasionally some eloquent rage about the way Indians have been treated in America."

Seals' essays have appeared in The Nation, Los Angeles Times, Newsday, and three scholarly anthologies.

His family memoir is entitled The Roswell Trilogy - Abduction at Roswell, Roswell Theogony, and Confessions of the Gods.

== Activism ==
Seals was a member of the American Indian Movement and the Bear Butte Council.

== Books by David Seals ==
- The Powwow Highway: a Novel (1990) New York, Plume. ISBN 0-452-26377-8
- Sweet Medicine (1992) New York, Orion Books. ISBN 0-517-58801-3
- The Poetic College: Essays and Poems on Literature and Society, 1989-1991 (1996) Sturgis, SD. Sky and Sage Books. ISBN 1-887786-07-4
- Third Eye Theatre (1996) Sturgis, SD. Sky and Sage Books. ISBN 1-887786-08-2
- Thunder Nation (1996) Sturgis, SD. Sky and Sage Books. ISBN 1-887786-13-9
- The Seventh Generation: Images of the Lakota Today (1998) New York, PowerHouse Books. ISBN 1-57687-031-6
- Abduction at Roswell (2008) Arizona Press. ISBN 978-1-4357-5899-5
- Confessions of the Gods (2014) Moonlit Press, Williams Arizona. ISBN 978-1-49753-852-8

=== Anthologies ===
- Klawans, Stuart; Peter Biskind, Carl Bromley (2000) Cinema Nation: The Best Writing on Film from the Nation 1913-2000. New York, NY: Thunder's Mouth Press. ISBN 1-56025-286-3 (contributor)
- Deloria Jr, Vine; Marijo Moore (2003) Genocide of the Mind: New Native American Writing. Nation Books. ISBN 1-56025-511-0 (contributor)
- Moore, Marijo (2006) Eating Fire, Tasting Blood: An Anthology of the American Indian Holocaust. New York, NY: Thunder's Mouth Press. ISBN 1-56025-838-1 (contributor)
