= Under the Boardwalk (disambiguation) =

"Under the Boardwalk" is a song recorded by the Drifters in 1964.

Under the Boardwalk may also refer to:

- Under the Boardwalk (1989 film), an American teen romance/drama film
- Under the Boardwalk (2023 film), an American animated film
- Under the Boardwalk: The Monopoly Story, a 2010 documentary
