= Marilyn Harris (writer) =

American novelist

- Born: June 4, 1931; Oklahoma City, Oklahoma, U.S.
- Died: January 18, 2002 (aged 70); Norman, Oklahoma, U.S.
- Occupation: Writer
- Writing career
- Language: English
- Genres: Novels, short stories
- Notable works: Eden series, Hatter Fox

Marilyn Harris (June 4, 1931 – January 18, 2002) was an American author best known for her seven-novel "Eden" series, an historical saga about the Eden family of England. The series contains This Other Eden (1977); The Prince of Eden (1978); The Eden Passion (1979); The Women of Eden (1980); Eden Rising (1982); American Eden (1987); and Eden and Honor (1989). She is also the author of the best selling novel, Hatter Fox (1973), adapted into a 1977 CBS movie, The Girl Called Hatter Fox.

== Early years ==
Harris was born on June 4, 1931, in Oklahoma City, Oklahoma, the daughter of John P., an oil executive, and Dora (nee Veal) Harris. Harris was educated in her home state, attending Cottey College from 1945 to 1951, then transferring to the University of Oklahoma, from which she received a bachelor of arts degree in 1953 and a master of arts degree in 1955.

== Writing career ==
Harris's first collection of short stories, King's Ex, was published by Doubleday in 1967. After that Harris proved a prolific author, publishing twenty books, including novels, short stories, romance/historical fiction and children's fiction in a twenty-year period from 1970 to 1989. These works, in addition to those listed above, include In the Midst of Earth (1969), The Peppersalt Land (1970), The Runaway's Diary (1971), The Conjurers (1974), Bledding Sorrow (1976), The Portent (1980), The Last Great Love (1981), The Diviner (1983), Warrick (1985), Night Games (1987), and Lost and Found (1991). The novel Hatter Fox was successfully filmed as a TV movie under the title The Girl Called Hatter Fox starring Ronny Cox (Dr. Teague Summer) and Joanelle Romero (the title character). The film marked the first time a Native American actress played a leading role. Harris's work has received a wide readership; in 1983, nine million of her books were in print, and her work has been translated into many languages, including French, German, Spanish, Portuguese, Polish, and Japanese. She was also an author in residence at Oklahoma's Central State University.

== Awards ==
Among the awards Harris received are the following: O. Henry Award, 1968, for her début short story Icarus Again, published in April 1967 issue of The Malahat Review; University of Oklahoma Literary Award, in 1970; Lewis Carroll Shelf Award, 1973, for The Runaway's Diary; Oklahoma Federation of Writers Teepee Award, 1974; Women in Communications By-Liner Award, 1974; Oklahoma Writers Hall of Fame Award, 1980; and Cottey College Distinguished Alumna Award, 1981.

== Family ==
Harris married Edgar V. Springer, Jr., a professor, in 1953; the couple had two children: John P. and Karen Louise. She died in Norman, Oklahoma, on January 18, 2002.
