= Philip Orbanes =

American board game designer

Philip E. Orbanes is an American board game designer, author, founding partner and former president of Winning Moves Games in Danvers, Massachusetts. Orbanes is a graduate of the Case Institute of Technology (now Case Western Reserve University). He was a Senior Vice President for Research and Development at Parker Brothers until the 1990s. Orbanes has also served as Chief Judge at U.S. National and World Monopoly tournaments.

Orbanes has written three books about the board game Monopoly (his book The Monopoly Companion has been printed in three distinct editions). His Monopoly: The World’s Most Famous Game and How It Got That Way is considered the definitive reference book. He also wrote a book about the history of Parker Brothers from the 1880s to the start of the 21st century. His book about the card game Rook, however, is only available as part of a package with the game's cards, published by Winning Moves Games. Orbanes also authored articles for The Games Journal on acquiring the rights to out of print games, and the card game, Canasta.

Orbanes was prominently featured in the documentary Under the Boardwalk: The Monopoly Story for his role serving as the Chief Judge at U.S. and World Monopoly Championships for over 30 years.

== Life ==
Philip E. Orbanes was born in 1947. When in college, he started his first game company. Orbanes went to work for Parker Bros. at age 32 as head of research and development.

In 1995, Orbanes co-founded Winning Moves Games. He then created the Speed Die for the Monopoly game adding it to Winning Moves' Monopoly Mega Edition (2006).

== Bibliography ==
- Orbanes, Philip (1988). The Monopoly Companion (First ed.). Bob Adams, Inc. ISBN 1-55850-950-X.
- Orbanes, Philip (1999). The Monopoly Companion: The Players Guide (Second ed.). Adams Media Corporation. ISBN 1-58062-175-9.
- Orbanes, Philip E. (1999). Rook in a Book. Winning Moves, Inc. ISBN 1-891056-25-5.
- Orbanes, Philip E. (August 2000). "The Canasta Story". The Games Journal. Archived from the original on August 18, 2000.
- Orbanes, Philip E. (September 2000). "Acquiring Game Rights". The Games Journal. Archived from the original on February 17, 2001.
- Orbanes, Philip E. (2004). The Game Makers: The Story of Parker Brothers from Tiddledy Winks to Trivial Pursuit (First ed.). Harvard Business School Press. ISBN 1-59139-269-1.
- Orbanes, Philip E. (2006). Monopoly: The World's Most Famous Game—And How it Got that Way (First ed.). Da Capo Press. ISBN 0-306-81489-7.
- Orbanes, Philip (2007). The Monopoly Companion: The Players Guide (Third ed.). Sterling Publishing Co., Inc. ISBN 978-1-4027-5406-7.
- Orbanes, Philip E. (2013). Monopoly, Money and You: How to Profit from the Game's Secrets of Success (First ed.). McGraw-Hill. ISBN 9780071808439.
- Orbanes, Philip (2025). Monopoly X: how a top-secret World War II operation used the game of Monopoly to help Allied POWs escape, conceal spies, and send secret codes (First ed.). New York: HarperCollins. ISBN 978-0-06-342513-2.
