= The Malahat Review =

Canadian literary magazine

- Editor: Iain Higgins
- Categories: literary magazine
- Frequency: Quarterly
- Founded: 1967
- Company: University of Victoria
- Country: Canada
- Based in: Victoria, British Columbia
- Language: English
- Website: www.malahatreview.ca
- ISSN: 0025-1216

The Malahat Review is a Canadian quarterly literary magazine established in 1967. It features contemporary Canadian and international works of poetry, fiction, and creative non-fiction as well as reviews of recently published Canadian literature. Iain Higgins is the current editor.

The Malahat Review publishes new work by emerging and established writers of poetry, fiction, and creative non-fiction from Canada and abroad. The Malahat Review is based in Victoria, British Columbia, and circulates locally, regionally, and nationally throughout Canada and sixteen other countries. A paid subscription base exists that is 88 percent Canadian, with libraries representing 16 percent of paid subscriptions.

== History ==
The Malahat Review was founded in 1967 at the University of Victoria by Robin Skelton and John Peter. The magazine was edited by Skelton from 1971 to 1983, and thereafter by Constance Rooke, Derk Wynand, Marlene Cookshaw, and John Barton (editor from 2004 to 2018). The magazine initially reflected Skelton's interest in European and international literature but has focused on Canadian fiction, poetry, and book reviews since 1983. Creative non-fiction was added as a genre in 2007.

== Awards ==
Ninety-two Malahat Review authors have featured in the National Magazine Awards Foundation's roster of finalists, taking home nineteen gold and thirteen silver awards to date. Stories by Malahat Review writers have won the M&S Journey Prize eight times, with a total of thirty-nine stories anthologized. Marilyn Harris' début short story "Icarus Again," published in April 1967's issue #2, and Mary Swan's Malahat Review Novella Prize winner "The Deep" published in July 2000's issue #131, won the PEN/O. Henry Award. Katherine Magyarody's début short story and Malahat Review Open Season Fiction Award winner "Goldhawk," published in April 2016's issue #194, was one of the twelve winners of the 2017 PEN/Robert J. Dau Short Story Prize for Emerging Writers.

== Contests ==
The Malahat Review holds a variety of contests each year:

Open Season Awards: November 1 deadline, three CAD$2,000 prizes (one for each genre). Submissions accepted for poetry, fiction, and creative nonfiction. Winners are published in the spring issue.

Novella Prize/Long Poem Prize: February 1 deadline. The Novella Prize (one CAD$2,000 prize) and Long Poem Prize (two CAD$1,250 prizes) alternate in even and odd years respectively. Regardless of genre, the winning entry or entries appear in the summer issue.

Far Horizons Award for Poetry/Far Horizons Award for Short Fiction: May 1 deadline, one CAD$1,250 prize. The Far Horizons Award for Poetry is given in even years, the Far Horizons Award for Short Fiction is given during odd years. These are short form contests only open to writers who have not yet published in book form for the genre in question. Winners are published in the fall issue.

Constance Rooke Creative Nonfiction Prize: August 1 deadline, one CAD$1,250 prize. This contest was established in 2007, with the winning entry appearing in the winter issue.

== Location ==
The Malahat Review's office is located at the University of Victoria, in the Clearihue building.

== See also ==
- List of literary magazines
