= Joanelle Romero =

American filmmaker and actor from New Mexico and California, U.S.

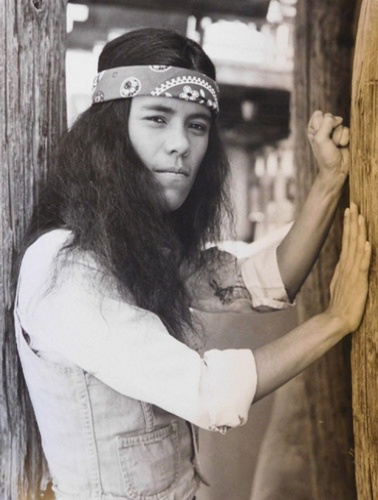
- Romero in 1977
- Born: 1957 (age 68–69); Albuquerque, New Mexico, United States
- Citizenship: American
- Occupations: Humanitarian; filmmaker; actress; recording artist
- Known for: Started Native American Heritage Month in Los Angeles; Founded Red Nation Television Network and Red Nation International Film Festival
- Website: joanelleromero.com

Joanelle Romero is an American filmmaker and actress. Romero is the founder and president of Red Nation Television Network and Red Nation International Film Festival. Romero's film American Holocaust: When It's All Over I'll Still Be Indian was short-listed for an Academy Award in the Documentary Short Branch category.

In 2007, she was designated a Women's History Month honoree by the National Women's History Project.

== Personal life ==
Romero was born in Albuquerque, New Mexico, in 1957. Her mother, actress Rita Rogers (1936–2012), was born Ida Mae Aragón in Albuquerque, New Mexico. Joanelle grew up in Los Angeles, California, and her biography states: "Joanelle is born Spanish-Sephardic with Apache Ancestry, a relative of Pawnee, Dine, Paiute, Pojoaque, Southern Ute, Haudenosaunee and kinship to Lakota and Jicarilla Apache." She has stated that she is "a citizen of Mescalero-Chiricahua Apache, Dinétah, Paiute Nations and is Spanish Sephardic." In 2016, Native News Online wrote that she was "born Apache, Cheyenne and Spanish Sephardic Jew".

== Career ==
Romero was shortlisted for an Academy Award, for her documentary short, American Holocaust: When It's All Over I'll Still Be Indian, narrated by Ed Asner. Romero directed, produced, wrote and scored the music for the film that compares the Holocaust with the United States government's treatment of American Indians and the lasting effects on contemporary culture.

In 1991 Romero founded Spirit World Productions. She was inspired to create Spirit World Productions due to the lack of Native representation in the entertainment industry. Spirit World released American Holocaust: When It's All Over I'll Still Be Indian, a documentary film narrated by Ed Asner. Romero directed, produced, wrote and scored the music for the film that compares the Holocaust with the United States' government treatment of American Indians and the lasting effects on contemporary culture. As an actress Romero has appeared in films including The Girl Called Hatter Fox (1977 TV movie based on the novel by Marilyn Harris), 1982's Barbarosa and Parasite, and Powwow Highway.

Romero founded the nonprofit organization Red Nation Celebration Institute (RNCI) in 1995. In 2005 she received the Armin T. Wegner Humanitarian Award for "the vision to see the truth … and the courage to speak it". Romero started the first Native American Heritage Month in Los Angeles in November 2005, garnering her the title "The First Lady" of American Indian Heritage Month.

Romero has been a member of the American Film Academy since 2016.

== Filmography ==
=== Film ===
Year	Title	Role	Notes
1977	The Girl Called Hatter Fox	Hatter Fox	TV movie
1980	Roughnecks	Woman	TV movie
1982	Barbarosa	Young Prostitute	
1982	Parasite	Bo	
1982	The Legend of Walks Far Woman	Fire Wing	TV movie
1982	Life of the Party: The Story of Beatrice	Julie	TV movie
1983	The Horse Dealer's Daughter	Young Woman	Short
1984	The Mystic Warrior	Zitkala	TV movie
1985	City Limits	Woman in Desert	
1986	Vendetta	Elena	
1989	Powwow Highway	Bonnie Red Bow	
1991	Miracle in the Wilderness	Little Deer	TV movie
2004	Black Cloud	Victoria Nez	
2021	Wild Indian	Native Woman	

=== Television ===
Year	Title	Role	Notes
1979	Insight	Laura	Episode: "When, Jenny? When?"
1982	Hill Street Blues	Maria	Episode: "Invasion of the Third World Body Snatchers"
1983	Cutter to Houston	Starr	Episode: "From the Smallest Crystal, from the Smallest Stone"
1992	Murder, She Wrote	Alice Chee	Episode: "Night of the Coyote"

=== Video games ===
Year	Title	Role	Notes
1996	Santa Fe Mysteries: The Elk Moon Murder	Anna Elk Moon	
