= Far Haven =

- Directed by: Brent Christy; Gary Wheeler
- Written by: Dustin Rikert; William Shockley
- Produced by: Gary Wheeler
- Starring: Bailey Chase; Amanda Righetti; Bruce Boxleitner; A Martinez; Jesse Kove; Martin Kove; Nancy Stafford
- Production company: INSP Films
- Release date: September 3, 2023
- Country: United States
- Language: English

Far Haven is a 2023 American Western film, which was set in the late 1880s, and starring Bailey Chase, Amanda Righetti, Bruce Boxleitner, Martin Kove, and A. Martinez.

The film was released in September 2023.

== Plot ==
After serving two years in a territorial prison in Yuma, Arizona for a crime he didn't commit, Hunter Braddock is released in 1887. He moves to the Arizona town of Far Haven to start a new life with his two young children.

Shortly after arriving in the peaceful town of Far Haven, his father-in-law is attacked by a raiding party. In order to protect the ones he loves the most, Braddock must confront marauders and corruption strangling the town.

== Cast ==
- Bailey Chase as Hunter Braddock
- Amanda Righetti as Lilly Rayne
- Bruce Boxleitner as Ben Watkins
- Nancy Stafford as Alma Watkins
- Martin Kove as Ambrose Masse
- Jesse Kove as Clay Cassidy
- A Martinez as Abraham
- Lev Cameron as Luke Watkins
- Livi Birch as Adele Watkins
- William Shockley as Deputy Jensen Longley
- David Gridley as Deputy Fisher
- Drew Waters as Butch Broussard
- Tom Proctor as Deacon Kane
- Erin O'Brien as Willa Broussard

== Production & release ==
Principal photography took place towards the end of 2022 and into early 2023 at Mescal Studios movie set (the historic movie town built in 1969 for the Lee Marvin classic, Monte Walsh, and the sister site to Old Tucson Studios).
