= Larry Groupé =

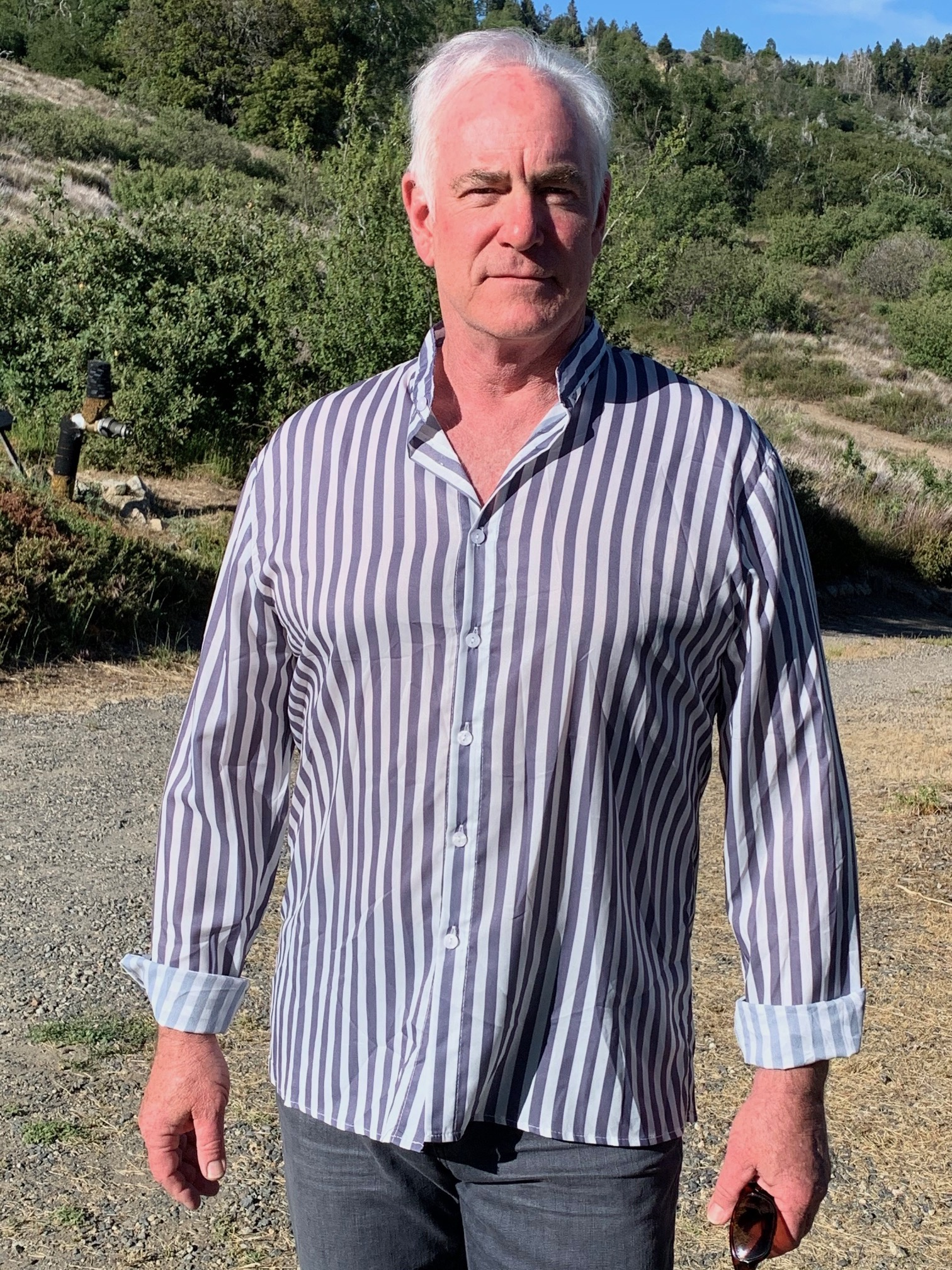

Background information
- Born: Lawrence Nash Groupé; April 1957 (age 68–69)
- Genres: Film score
- Occupation: Composer
- Website: larrygroupe.com

Lawrence Nash Groupé (born April 1957) is an American film score composer for Immediate Music's offshoot label, Imperativa Records. Groupé has composed and orchestrated music for dozens of films and television programs. His most popular works include the score for Rod Lurie's movies Deterrence and The Contender, and the television series Commander in Chief, which starred Geena Davis as the United States' first female President, Mackenzie Allen. Groupé has been nominated four times for an Emmy award, and won three. In 2004, he was nominated for an Emmy for the best original score for the TV series Line of Fire. He later won Emmys for the score of the documentary film Jonas Salk: Personally Speaking, for the short subject film "Residue", about the US early involvement in Cambodia, and for Under the Boardwalk: The Monopoly Story.

In 2001, Groupé composed and orchestrated music in a collaboration with the British progressive rock band Yes for their Magnification album. He also toured with Yes and conducted a 60-piece orchestra as part of their promotional tour for the album, Yessymphonic.

== Education and career ==
Groupé is a graduate of the Conservatory of Music at the University of the Pacific, and was the recipient of the ASCAP award for student composers. He received a Masters in Music Composition at the University of California, San Diego where he studied with Roger Reynolds, Bernard Rands, Toru Takemitsu. He also studied computer generated music at Stanford with John Chowning and Leland Smith.

Groupé has composed, conducted and produced over 80 CD recordings. His music has been performed by a number of symphony orchestras, including Water Unfolding, a fantasy for orchestra commissioned by the San Diego Symphony, and Menagerie, a suite for solo organ, commissioned by the Spreckels Organ Society for its 85th birthday.

Beginning in the Fall of 2016, Groupé became adjunct professor of music at the Indiana University Jacobs School of Music specializing in scoring for visual media.

Groupé is a co-founder, alongside composer Roger Neill, of the Palomar Film Music Workshop, which has convened yearly in the Pauma Valley in San Diego County, California since 2015.
