= Eternity: The Movie =

2014 film

- Poster
- Directed by: Ian Thorpe
- Screenplay by: Joey Abi-Loutfi; Eric E. Staley; Ian Thorpe
- Produced by: Joey Abi-Loutfi; Brian A. Hoffman; Greg Smith; Eric E. Staley; Kevin Tostado
- Starring: Barrett Crake; Myko Olivier; Nikki Leonti; Eric Roberts; Martin Kove; Jon Gries
- Cinematography: Chris Ernst
- Edited by: Eric E. Staley; Ian Thorpe
- Music by: Kevin Brough
- Production company: Sidecar Productions
- Distributed by: Indican Pictures
- Release dates: March 8, 2014 (Cinequest Film Festival); October 17, 2014 (New York City)
- Running time: 88 minutes
- Country: United States
- Language: English
- Budget: $220,000

Eternity: The Movie is a 2014 American musical comedy drama film directed by Ian Thorpe and screenplay by Thorpe, Joey Abi-Loutfi and Eric E. Staley. The film stars Barrett Crake, Myko Olivier, Eric Roberts, Martin Kove, Jon Gries and Nikki Leonti.

== Plot ==
A moronic duo form a two-man band in the 1980s.

== Cast ==
- Barrett Crake as Todd Lucas
- Myko Olivier as B.J. Fairchild
- Eric Roberts as Gene Weiner
- Martin Kove as Barry Goldfield Sr.
- Jon Gries as Barry Goldfield Jr.
- Nikki Leonti as Gina Marie
- Tamzin Brown as Kelly
- Donna Ruko as Jade
- Liz McGeever as Sally
- Tara Hazlewood as Alana
- Jesse Kove as Scotty
- Scott Seymour as Jesse

== Production ==
Principal photography for the film took place in San Diego.

== Release ==
The film premiered at Cinequest Film & Creativity Festival. It was distributed by Indican Pictures.

== Reception ==
On the review aggregator website Rotten Tomatoes, 0% of 6 critics' reviews are positive, with an average rating of 2.3/10.

The New York Times said it had "much more dead air than laughs." The Village Voice claims that "the jokes are slow and obvious." Los Angeles Times does state that the movie gets the wardrobe right for the 80s period it is set in. In a more favorable review, Screen Anarchy states they were surprised that the script was humorous.
