= Gathering of Heroes: Legend of the Seven Swords =

- Directed by: Mark Steven Grove
- Written by: Mark Steven Grove
- Produced by: Brian D. Cahill
- Starring: Martin Kove; Christopher Atkins; Trygve Lode
- Cinematography: Jon Firestone
- Edited by: Mark Steven Grove
- Music by: Jeremy Christopher
- Production companies: Gathering of Heroes, Fusion Factory Films, Asgard Entertainment
- Distributed by: Inferno Motion Pictures
- Release date: January 2, 2018
- Running time: 103 minutes
- Country: United States
- Language: English

Gathering of Heroes: Legend of the Seven Swords is a 2018 American science fiction fantasy action film starring Martin Kove, Christopher Atkins and Trygve Lode. It was shot in 4K on the RED ONE digital cinema camera in Colorado, USA.

== Plot ==
In the mystical realm of Ryntia, the forces of the underworld are aligning to unleash a plague of evil upon the surface. The deadly bat-like Blood Reavers, the Goblin Hordes, the Saurian Maurauders, the Orcish Warmongers and the feline Shadowcat mercenaries have pledged their respective clans to the service of Bre'Gwen, queen of the deep elves. Together they seek to destroy the human and Elven kingdoms and rule all of Ryntia in the name of evil.

However even with their combined strength, Bre'Gwen's forces are no match for the powerful Grayraven kingdom led by the majestic king, Garrick Grayraven. To ensure their success, Bre'gwen forges an alliance with an unlikely human who holds the secret to acquiring a powerful artifact that will allow them to summon and control an army of undead warriors from centuries past. Guided by fragmented visions, a mysterious Oracle gathers seven unlikely heroes to face the threat. A heroic knight, a deep elf sorceress, an eccentric bard, a silver elf druid, a righteous paladin, a barbarian huntress, and a brooding thief are the only ones capable of stopping this evil at its source but first they must embark upon a quest to find the legendary seven swords of Draconus.

== Cast ==
- Martin Kove as Galaron the Brave
- Christopher Atkins as King Greyraven
- Trygve Lode as the Oracle
- Mark Steven Grove as Ghar Blackmane
- Debra Marshall as Reina
- Kirk Montgomery as Lord Aurin
- Sam Del Rio as Jeris
- Michelle Dover as Queen Bre'gwen
- Sera N. Salazar as Isabelle
- Lauren Melone as Kyriani
- Lucky McQueede as Shalomin Songsteel
- Brian Cahill as Caldir
- Kristie Griever as Tari
