= Jesse Kove =

American actor

- Born: November 2, 1990 (age 35); Los Angeles, California, U.S.
- Occupation: Actor
- Years active: 2009–present

Jesse Kove (born November 2, 1990) is an American actor best known for his role as David in Cobra Kai.

== Early life ==
Kove was born to Martin Kove and Vivienne Kove on November 2, 1990, in Los Angeles. He has a twin sister, Rachel. Kove grew up on film sets on account of his father. At age 10, he began using his father's camera to create home movies, also manufacturing skits to perform for his family. He acted in plays in high school.

== Education ==
As a child and teen, Kove partook in a variety of performing arts and improv classes.

== Career ==
Kove began his career in off-Broadway productions in New York. He then transitioned to television and film. His breakthrough role was in D-Day: Battle of Omaha Beach. In 2021, he joined the cast of Cobra Kai, the Karate Kid universe that brought his father fame. He also appeared in NBC’s Magnum, P.I.

== Personal life ==
Kove was raised Jewish and had a bar mitzvah.

== Film and television ==
Work	Year	Role
The Last Firefighter	2026	Shane
The Cobra Kai Movie Part II	2025	Himself
All For Love	2025	Luke
President Down	2025	
The Workout	2025	Trent
Forsaken Mercenary (short)	2025	Daniel Hunt
Cobra Kai Part II	2025	David
Killing Mary Sue	2025	Chet Steiner
Screamboat	2025	Lieutenant Diaz
Cobra Kai	2024	David
Dark Night of the Soul	2024	Daniel
Blue Ridge	2024	Gage Pratt
The Night They Came Home	2024	Wayfaring stranger
Magnum P.I.	2024	Neil McRae
The Holiday Proposal Plan	2023	Kip Bravo
Call of Duty: Modern Warfare III	2023	Manuel Hammer
Far Haven	2023	Clay Cassidy
A Taste of Love	2023	Jacob
Ask Me to Dance	2022	Ron
Gravesend	2021	Eli
Recipe for Abduction	2021	Todd
The Shallow	2021	Chuckie
Cobra Kai	2021	David
Christmas on the Menu	2020	Nolan
Max Reload and the Nether Blasters	2020	Steve
Bring Me A Dream	2020	Officer Trent Miller
Bare Knuckle Brawler	2019	Joey Calderon
VFW	2019	Ravenous Hyper
D-Day: Battle of Omaha Beach	2019	First Sgt. Bud Lommell
Psycho Stripper	2019	Ethan
This is Our Christmas	2019	Mr. Turner
Show No Mercy	2018	Bobby
Bloodlands	2017	Detective Grus Loman
Fake News	2017	Jeffrey Katz
Teach Peace	2017	Troy
The Black Hole	2016	Fritz
Undercover	2016	Vice Cop Spanks
On Wings of Eagles	2016	Hugh Johnson
Steve the Intern	2016	Nash
The Shadow	2015	Harry Cranston
As Night Comes	2014	Brad Larson
Eternity: The Movie	2014	Scotty
Jet Set	2013	Photographer
Axe Giant: The Wrath of Paul Bunyan	2013	Zack Moore
The Audition	2012	Jesse
Bare Knuckles	2010	Soldier
First Day	2010	Ryan
Ballistica	2009	CIA Agent #1
