= Parasite (1982 film) =

1982 film by Charles Band

- Original theatrical poster
- Directed by: Charles Band
- Written by: Michael Shoob; Alan J. Adler; Frank Levering
- Produced by: Charles Band
- Starring: Robert Glaudini; Demi Moore; Luca Bercovici; Cherie Currie; Vivian Blaine
- Cinematography: Mac Ahlberg
- Edited by: Brad Arensman
- Music by: Richard Band
- Distributed by: Embassy Pictures (1982, original); Koch International (2000, DVD)
- Release date: March 12, 1982
- Running time: 85 minutes
- Country: United States
- Language: English
- Budget: $800,000
- Box office: $5.5 million

Parasite is a 1982 American science fiction horror film produced and directed by Charles Band. The film is set in a dystopian, post-apocalyptic future in which the United States has been taken over by a criminal organization which unwittingly creates an uncontrollable deadly parasite and sets it loose on the population. The film received negative reviews from film critics, who viewed it as a poorly written B movie with unconvincing special effects. The film features actress Demi Moore in her first major film role.

== Plot ==
In the near future, an atomic disaster has reduced the world to poverty. Instead of a government, America is run by an organization called the Merchants, who exploit the degenerate remains of society. In order to keep control of the populace, the Merchants force Dr. Paul Dean to create a new life form, a parasite that feeds on its host. Realizing the deadly potential of such a being, Dean escapes the Merchants with the parasite, infecting himself in the process.

Now on the run, he travels from town to town, studying the parasite so that he can find a way to destroy it, all the while keeping one step ahead of a Merchant named Wolf, who is hunting for him. While resting in a desert town, he is attacked by a gang of hooligans-Dana, Arn, Shell, Bo, and Zeke, led by Ricus, former slave of the Merchants. The gang steal a silver canister containing the parasite, not realizing what it is. It escapes and infects one of the members.

Meanwhile, Paul befriends a pretty young lemon grower named Patricia Welles, who promises to help him destroy the escaped parasite. Ricus, trying to save the life of his friend, comes to Paul for help, only to be confronted by Wolf. Patricia, Paul, and Ricus evade Wolf, but when they return, the parasite has spread to another member and grown into a fleshy worm with a mouthful of deadly teeth. Ricus becomes a turncoat and attempts to help, but is killed by Wolf. A friendly diner owner, named Collins, comes to aid the group. After Patricia helps kill the parasite bonded to Paul by high-pitch sound waves, the remaining parasite attacks Wolf who is then blown up by Patricia, Paul, and Collins.

== Cast ==
- Robert Glaudini as Dr. Paul Dean
- Demi Moore as Patricia Welles
- Luca Bercovici as Ricus
- James Davidson as Wolf, The Merchant
- Al Fann as Collins
- Cherie Currie as Dana
- Tom Villard as Zeke
- Vivian Blaine as Miss Daley
- Freddy Moore as Arn
- Cheryl Smith as Captive Girl
- Joanelle Romero as Bo

== Production ==
The film was envisioned as a remake of William Castle's The Tingler envisioned by Michael Shoob, Alan J. Adler, and Frank Levering that was further developed into what would become Parasite following an impromptu discussion between Adler, Charles Band, and Robert Glaudini. A Chance encounter between Band and 3-D specialist Randall Larson convinced Band that shooting the film in 3-D would add commercial appeal to Parasite.

== Home media ==
The film was released on CED 1983 by Embassy Home Entertainment, with a VHS from Wizard Video around the same time. A DVD edition was released by Cult Video on July 6, 1999. Anchor Bay later re-released the film on August 6, 2002, and again on September 13, 2005, the latter was released as a six-disk combo pack. A 3D Blu-ray disc was released in the US by Kino Lorber on October 22, 2019.

== Reception ==
On Rotten Tomatoes the film has an approval rating of 15% based on reviews from 13 critics, with an average rating of 3.3/10.

Variety magazine, in their review, called the film "lethargic between its terror scenes, making it a test of patience for all but the most fanatical of horror cheapies." In a similarly negative review, Time Out magazine called the script "banal" and the actors "uninspired," as well as calling the film "visually as uninteresting as a catfood commercial." Janet Maslin from The New York Times wrote, "The movie winds up more gruesome than scary, especially because the 3-D tricks are both repetitive and infrequent. It provides only a few strong shocks, chief among them an Alien-inspired scene that has the creature bursting forth from the body of one victim. These thrills notwithstanding, this is a badly acted B movie without much flair for involving its audience."

J. Doyle Wallis from DVD Talk gave the film 2/5 stars, stating that the film was "just for the nostalgic 80's horror film fan, and loony Demi Moore/Stan Winston stalkers". Scott Weinberg from eFilmCritic awarded the film 1 out of 5 stars, calling it "[an] Amazingly BORING sci-fi horror". TV Guide rated the film an abysmal 0 out of 5 stars, stating that the film was "[a] crushingly inane mess".

In 2019, during an appearance on The Late Late Show with James Corden, Moore named Parasite as "the worst movie [she had] ever been in".

== See also ==
- Parasitism
