= Under the Boardwalk: The Monopoly Story =

- Promotional movie poster for the film
- Directed by: Kevin Tostado
- Written by: Kevin Tostado; Craig Bentley
- Produced by: Kevin Tostado; Craig Bentley
- Starring: Philip Orbanes; Matt McNally; Rick Marinaccio; Ken Koury
- Narrated by: Zachary Levi
- Cinematography: Jordan Guzzardo
- Edited by: Kevin Tostado; Craig Bentley
- Music by: Larry Groupé
- Distributed by: Tostie Productions; Docurama
- Release dates: October 15, 2010 (Anaheim); March 4, 2011 (United States)
- Running time: 88 minutes
- Country: United States
- Language: English

Under the Boardwalk: The Monopoly Story (stylized as Under the Boardwalk: The MONOPOLY Story) is a 2010 documentary presenting a series of stories about the board game of Monopoly and those who play it. The film is narrated by Zachary Levi, and directed by Kevin Tostado.

The film premiered at the 2010 Anaheim International Film Festival.

== Synopsis ==
Under the Boardwalk depicts the Monopoly national and world championships that are held around the world every four years. Leading up to crowning of a new champion at the World Championship in Las Vegas, the filmmakers follow some of the players in the game, including:

- Matt, the defending U.S. champion, who tries to earn another trip to the World Championship, along with his girlfriend, a Las Vegas showgirl.
- Domenic, who won the Rhode Island state championship in 1995 as a 14-year-old, and has always dreamed of becoming world champion.
- Rick, a lawyer from Buffalo who wants to win the prize money so he and his fiancé can buy their first house.
- Ken, who trained for 12 hours a day during his summers in college in the 70s, and has been trying to win a national championship ever since.
- Tim, a teacher in California who has used the math skills learned from Monopoly to help his sixth-graders achieve record test scores.
- Bjørn, a 19-year-old student from Norway out to prove that a teenager can beat the seasoned veterans.
- Geoff, a banker from New Zealand whose nickname is The Nimble Thimble.

In addition to the documenting the competitive arena, the film also includes background information about the game of Monopoly and its development. The filmmakers investigate the psychology of the game, and game experts tell their favorite strategies for winning. The film includes Monopoly trivia and interviews with some of its die-hard collectors.

== Production and screening ==
Filming locations included the U.S., Canada, Mexico, UK, Norway, Japan, Singapore and Australia. Kevin Tostado and Craig Bentley were the film producers. The film had a limited theatrical release, beginning in March 2011 in San Diego, California, and was rated G by the MPAA. When the film launched digitally on iTunes in February 2012, it peaked at #99 on iTunes Top Movies chart and at #6 on iTunes Best-Selling Documentaries.

The film was released on DVD and Blu-ray in 2012.

== Awards ==
In 2014, the 51" version of the film received five Regional Emmy nominations from the Pacific Southwest chapter of NATAS. The film went on to win Emmy awards in four of the five categories for which it was nominated, including Outstanding Achievement in Documentary, Directing (Post-Production), Editor (No Time Limit, Program), and Musical Arrangement/Composition.

This film also won the Audience Award for Best Documentary at the 2010 Anaheim International Film Festival as well as a Silver Telly Award in 2011, the Telly's highest honor. Reviews of the film were mixed.
