= Red Nation Film Festival =

Film festival focused on films about indigenous people

- Founded: 1995; 30 years ago
- Founded by: Joanelle Romero
- Website: rednationff.com

The Red Nation Film Festival is a film festival focused on films about indigenous people. The festival was founded in 1995 and is curated by Joanelle Romero. It is unconnected to The Red Nation.

== History ==
The Red Nation Film Festival was founded in 1995 by Joanelle Romero, also its curator. It is run by Red Nation Celebration Institute, also founded in 1995, which also manages Red Nation Television Network.

At the 2011 festival, Russell Means was given the Oyate Wayanka Po Win Lifetime Achievement Award, while Michael Jackson posthumously received the Red Nation Humanitarian Award and Jerry Brown the American Indian Heritage Month Award.

In 2020, the festival was held virtually due to the pandemic. It screened 105 films, of which 73 were documentaries, 35 were directed by women, 12 were created by students and 10 were experimental films. Feature films screened included Monkey Beach and Parallel Minds, while documentaries included Gather, Revolution Moosehide, and Uma: A Water Crisis In Bolivia. Monkey Beach swept the awards, winning Outstanding Actress In A Leading Role (Tina Marie Lameman), Outstanding Actor In A Leading Role (Nathaniel Arcand), Best Director (Loretta Todd), and Best Picture.

As of March 2021, the festival was set to be held virtually again throughout November of that year, and additionally shown on Red Nation Television Network.

== Activity ==
The Red Nation Film Festival has made multiple unsuccessful attempts to partner with the Academy of Motion Picture Arts and Sciences to bring Native films into the mainstream. As of 2019, Joanelle Romero was working to make the festival Oscar-qualifying to improve the featured films' chances of being recognized in the Academy Awards.
