= The Girl Called Hatter Fox =

- Genre: Drama
- Based on: Hatter Fox by Marilyn Harris
- Written by: Darryl Ponicsan
- Directed by: George Schaefer
- Starring: Ronny Cox; Conchata Ferrell; John Durren
- Theme music composer: Fred Karlin
- Country of origin: United States
- Original language: English

Production
- Executive producer: Roger Gimbel
- Producer: George Schaefer
- Production locations: Albuquerque, New Mexico; Santa Fe, New Mexico
- Cinematography: Howard Schwartz
- Editor: Sidney Katz
- Running time: 100 min.
- Production companies: EMI Entertainment; Roger Gimbel Productions

Original release
- Network: CBS
- Release: October 12, 1977

The Girl Called Hatter Fox is a 1977 American TV movie starring Ronny Cox, and directed by George Schaefer.

It was the first film produced by EMI Television (they released The Amazing Howard Hughes, but bought the production company during production.) The movie, based on the bestselling novel by Marilyn Harris, marked the first time a Native American actress (Joanelle Romero) played a leading role.

== Cast ==
- Joanelle Romero
- Ronny Cox
- Conchata Ferrell
