= Killing Mary Sue =

2025 film by James Sunshine

- Release poster
- Directed by: James Sunshine
- Written by: James Sunshine
- Produced by: Patrick Durham; Dave Lugo; Larry Layfield; Jonathan Sachar
- Starring: Sierra McCormick; Dermot Mulroney; Jake Busey; French Stewart; Kym Whitley; Jesse Kove; Jason Mewes; Sean Patrick Flanery; Martin Kove
- Cinematography: John Sawyer
- Edited by: James Sunshine
- Music by: Tasos Eliopoulos
- Production company: Morningstar Films
- Distributed by: Samuel Goldwyn Films
- Release dates: May 17, 2025 (Los Angeles IFS Film Fest); June 13, 2025 (United States)
- Running time: 98 minutes
- Country: United States
- Language: English

Killing Mary Sue is an American action film written, directed and edited by James Sunshine. It stars Sierra McCormick, Dermot Mulroney, Sean Patrick Flanery, Jason Mewes, Jake Busey, Martin Kove, French Stewart, Kym Whitley, and Jesse Kove. The film features a corrupt senator who arranges for the murder of his biggest liability, his erratic burnout step-daughter, only for her to unwittingly discover her natural talent as an untouchable killer. It was released through video on demand on June 13, 2025.

== Plot ==
Mary Sue Harper is the problematic step-daughter of Senator Bradley Weiner, who is in a hotly contested re-election bid against political rival Anita Koch. After a series of high-profile scandals, Bradley works with his campaign manager, Wes, and a black market dealer, Knox, to hire an assassin to kill Mary Sue and make it appear as though he had no involvement. Bradley figures her death will eliminate her from being a thorn in his side, while also allowing him to garner the sympathy vote. Despite her affinity for causing chaos in Bradley's life and career, Mary Sue does not suspect Bradley's treachery and is, in fact, actually desperate for his love and attention.

When the first assassin arrives to kill Mary Sue, she is completely unfazed by his efforts to harm her and actually mistakes him for a prostitute. She unintentionally winds up killing him herself while attempting to demonstrate how rough she enjoys her foreplay. With his plan seemingly foiled, Bradley relies on Knox to hire additional assassins. Knox next sends an expert military death squad to dispatch Mary Sue, only for her to kill them all in a shootout where she inconceivably relies only on the skills she learned playing video games. In one last-ditch attempt to finally kill Mary Sue, Knox next arrives to complete the job personally but is near-instantly subdued and humiliated. In order to prevent Knox from leaking his secret scheme during an interrogation, Bradley kills Knox himself and blames the entire scheme on his political rival, Anita. This accusation provokes Mary Sue to quickly contact Anita and issue death threats against her, while also raising the suspicions of Bradley's wife, Janine. Meanwhile, Bradley discovers that their housekeeper, Carrie, is a secret KGB spy who was planted in their home to gather dirt and intelligence and wait for the perfect time leverage it against him. She now promises to kill Mary Sue once and for all in exchange for Bradley's loyalty.

Carrie, now known as Svetlana, draws Mary Sue out to a remote location in the woods to corner her alongside some allies. Yet instead of trying to kill her with brute force, Svetlana tempts Mary Sue in consuming drugs laced with a lethal dose of fentanyl. When that effort fails, a large-scale shootout ensues where Mary Sue once again comes out on top with little effort, killing Wes and Svetlana. Mary Sue's sinister overseas employer, Vladyslav Volkov, soon arrives at Bradley's house with Mary Sue and reveals that he's had her trained as a brainwashed sleeper agent to do his bidding. However, Mary Sue breaks free from his brainwashing and kills him. With no other option remaining, Bradley lastly attempts to salvage his relationship with Mary Sue and court her full loyalty. Mary Sue finally sees through his tactics and, together with Janine, breaks off her toxic relationship with him. Mary Sue and Janine leave and it is unknown if they ultimately decided to kill Bradley or not, but a news report later reports Bradley's apparent suicide. Bradley's rival, Anita, goes on to be the default front runner for the Senate election. However, she too has a problematic child and a nosy Russian asset for a housekeeper, insinuating that even with her electoral victory, the cycle of chaos will continue.

== Cast ==
- Sierra McCormick as Mary Sue Harper
- Dermot Mulroney as Bradley Weiner
- Sean Patrick Flanery as Cable Henry
- Jason Mewes as Ed Harper
- Martin Kove as Knox
- Kym Whitley as Anita Koch
- Jake Busey as Wes Adamle
- French Stewart as Vladyslav Volkov
- Jesse Kove as Chet Steiner
- Katie Killacky as Janine Weiner
- Rita Rehn as Carrie McConnell
- Andy Prosky as Russian General
- Onie Maceo Watlington as Young Mary Sue

== Production ==
In September 2024, it was announced that an action film written and directed by James Sunshine was in post-production, with Sierra McCormick, Dermot Mulroney, Sean Patrick Flanery, Jason Mewes, Martin Kove, Kym Whitley, Jake Busey, and French Stewart joining the cast. In January 2025, it was announced that the film's North American distribution rights was acquired by Samuel Goldwyn Films.

== Release ==
Killing Mary Sue had its world premiere at the Los Angeles IFS Film Fest on May 17, 2025, where it won the feature awards for Best Picture, Best Actress for McCormick, and Best Actor for Mulroney. It was released on video on demand from Samuel Goldwyn Films on June 13, 2025.
