= Kevin Tostado =

American filmmaker

Kevin Tostado is an American documentary filmmaker. He founded the independent film company Tostie Productions in 2004. Born in San Diego, CA, Tostado received a B.S. in electrical and computer engineering from Olin College in 2006. In addition to his work producing films, Tostado has written articles for New Jersey Lifestyle Magazine and has been interviewed by NPR's "More Than a Game", The Independent, and several other television and radio stations regarding his film career and projects.

== Films ==
=== Yellow Lights (2007) ===
His debut film, Yellow Lights, won awards for Best Feature and Best Cinematography at the Indie Fest USA film festival in Anaheim, California. Tostado co-directed, co-produced, and co-wrote Yellow Lights with fellow Olin College alumnus, Tom Kochem, while the two of them were in their senior year of college. The film stars actors Bennett Chabot, Aja Munsell, Andrew Tsang, and Amanda Hurley. The 88-minute film was shot for $500. As a companion to the film, the soundtrack for Yellow Lights features an original score for the film by Brian Shih and Sean McBride, as well as tracks from New England indie music groups The Whatnot, Lansdowne, and the Jon Frederik Band.

=== Under the Boardwalk: The Monopoly Story (2011) ===
Tostado followed up with Under the Boardwalk: The Monopoly Story (stylized as Under the Boardwalk: The MONOPOLY Story) in 2011 a documentary that examines how the game of Monopoly became the world's most popular proprietary board over its 75-year history, as well as following the players that are competing in the United States and World Monopoly Championships that are held every 4–6 years. This film won the Audience Award for Best Documentary at the Anaheim International Film Festival in 2010 where it premiered, and also played at the Austin Film Festival (2010) and River Run Film Festival (2011). The film launched theatrically in March 2011 in San Diego, California, and was well received in the local press. Rotten Tomatoes reports the film as 85% fresh by 13 critic reviews.

On April 29, 2014, the 51" version of the film received five Regional Emmy nominations from the Pacific Southwest Chapter of NATAS. The film went on to win Emmy awards in four of the five categories for which it was nominated, including Outstanding Achievement in Documentary, Directing (Post-Production), Editor (No Time Limit, Program), and Musical Arrangement/Composition.

=== Suds County, USA (2012) ===
Tostado was an associate producer on Suds County, USA, a documentary about the rise of microbreweries in San Diego County, California. The film is narrated by Kevin Murphy.

=== Eternity: The Movie (2014) ===
Tostado was a producer on Eternity: The Movie, which was shot in San Diego in Summer 2012. The film stars Barrett Crake, Myko Olivier, Nikki Leonti, Eric Roberts, Martin Kove, and Jon Gries. The film is a parody of the 1980s told through the eyes of a fictional R&B duo as we follow their rise and fall. The film held its World Premiere at the Cinequest Film Festival on March 8, 2014, and had its theatrical premiere in New York City on October 17, 2014. This will be followed by a limited theatrical release in cities in the U.S. and Canada.

== Other projects ==
=== The Drucker Files (2007) ===
Tostado was the director of photography for The Drucker Files, a webseries for NBC's Heroes. The webseries shot in Burbank, California at the offices of Grapevine Productions. The webseries starred David Pitcher, Kimberly Arland, Mark Ford, Rome Kanda, and Alice Amter.

=== Research. (2013) ===
Tostado co-produced Research., a webseries starring Gabriel Diani, Barry Bostwick and Doug Jones and directed by Adam Hall. This webseries premiered on YouTube in June and July 2013.
