= Debra Marshall =

American actress and professional wrestling valet (born 1960)

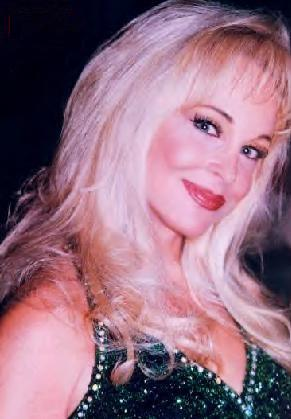
- Debra in May 1999

Personal information
- Born: Debra Gale Marshall; March 2, 1960 (age 66) Tuscaloosa, Alabama, U.S.
- Education: Lee Strasberg Theatre and Film Institute; University of Alabama (MS)
- Spouses: Steve McMichael (m. 1985; div. 1998) Stone Cold Steve Austin (m. 2000; div. 2003)

Professional wrestling career
- Ring name(s): Debra; Debra McMichael; Queen Debra
- Billed height: 5 ft 6 in (168 cm)
- Billed from: Tuscaloosa, Alabama
- Debut: 1995
- Retired: 2002

Debra Gale Marshall (formerly McMichael and Williams; born March 2, 1960) is an American retired professional wrestling valet, professional wrestler, and actress. She is best known for her time with World Championship Wrestling (WCW) between 1995 and 1998 as Queen Debra and with the World Wrestling Federation (WWF) between 1998 and 2002 as simply Debra.

Marshall began her career in professional wrestling in 1995, accompanying her husband Steve "Mongo" McMichael to the ring in WCW. She joined the WWF in 1998, where she managed the tag team of Jeff Jarrett and Owen Hart until Hart's in-ring death in May 1999. Later that year, she won the WWF Women's Championship from Sable in an evening gown match. She later appeared on-screen with her second husband Stone Cold Steve Austin until 2002, when the duo left the company.

== Early life ==
Raised in Tuscaloosa, Alabama, Marshall became a track-runner, cheerleader, and Homecoming Queen in high school before attending the Lee Strasberg Theatre Institute in New York City. She then became a flight attendant. Before her involvement in wrestling, she competed and won the title of 1987 Mrs. Illinois America in Elgin, Illinois and went on to compete in the Mrs. America pageant that same year in Las Vegas, Nevada. She later competed and won in the 1992 Mrs. Texas USA pageant held in Houston, Texas and went on to compete in the National Mrs. USA pageant. Marshall also attended the University of Alabama.

== Professional wrestling career ==
=== World Championship Wrestling (1995–1997) ===
Marshall first appeared in World Championship Wrestling (WCW) in late-1995 and early-1996, making occasional unnamed appearances as an audience plant, and as part of a group of valets for the team of Hulk Hogan and "Macho Man" Randy Savage. In April 1996, she began appearing regularly as a valet for her husband, Steve "Mongo" McMichael as he transitioned from commentator to wrestler. Based on her real-life participation in beauty pageants, Debra took on the role of a beauty-pageant queen character, giving herself the nickname "The Queen of WCW" and often making remarks about other wrestlers and valets in kayfabe interviews. At The Great American Bash 1996, Steve McMichael and his partner Kevin Greene competed against two of the Four Horsemen (Ric Flair and Arn Anderson). Flair won the match after Mongo and Debra turned on Greene by hitting him with a steel briefcase, joining the Four Horsemen. She managed the stable with Miss Elizabeth and Woman. The briefcase later became one of Debra's signature objects.

At Bash at the Beach in July 1997, Debra turned on Mongo during his WCW United States Heavyweight Championship match against Jeff Jarrett by handing Jarrett the steel briefcase, which he then used to knock Mongo out and thus to win the match.

Debra briefly managed Goldberg and Alex Wright. On the November 24, 1997 edition of Nitro, Wright fired Debra after she accidentally distracted him, causing a loss to Prince Iaukea. After her divorce from McMichael, Debra left WCW.

=== World Wrestling Federation (1998–2002) ===
==== Manager of Jeff Jarrett; WWF Women's Champion (1998–1999) ====
In October 1998, Marshall reunited with Jarrett in the WWF. At the beginning of her WWF career, known as Debra McMichael and later simply as Debra, she played the part of a shrewd businesswoman, wearing business suits. She also played the part of Jarrett's girlfriend. In late 1998, Jarrett began a feud with Goldust that culminated in December at Rock Bottom: In Your House in a "Striptease match". During the match, Debra hit Goldust over the head with Jarrett's trademark guitar, enabling Jarrett to win. WWF Commissioner Shawn Michaels, however, disqualified Jarrett, and Debra had to strip due to the match's stipulations. As she stripped, The Blue Blazer (Owen Hart) and Jarrett covered her up. Debra, however, began utilizing a new strategy during matches, distracting Jarrett's opponents by unbuttoning her blouse. She would willingly take off her blouse to show the crowd her "puppies", a nickname originally bestowed upon her chest by wrestler Road Dogg and later utilized by commentator Jerry Lawler.

The strategy helped Jarrett and partner Hart defeat the Big Boss Man and Ken Shamrock to become WWF World Tag Team Champions in January 1999. In the same month, she also attempted to cause distraction in a tag match between Jarrett and Hart against Road Dogg and Billy Gunn, but was attacked by Chyna, who was also at ringside. In February, Debra feuded with female professional wrestler Ivory, making her in-ring debut in a mixed tag match on Monday Night Raw, which ended in a no contest. Immediately after the bell rang, she attacked Ivory and hit her with Jarrett's guitar. The same month, Jarrett and Hart retained the tag title in a tag match against Ivory's associates Mark Henry and D'Lo Brown at St. Valentine's Day Massacre: In Your House with Debra's assistance. In March, the team lost their tag title to the team of Kane and X-Pac. She also competed in her first singles match, against Ivory but lost via disqualification after Jacqueline and Terri Runnels attacked Ivory during the match. As Debra continued to manage Jarrett and Hart, a potential storyline developed where Hart and Debra would have an affair, but the creative team or Owen himself more likely vetoed the idea before it played out on-screen. A team name was also in the works—Debra favoring "Talent and Attitude" (T&A)—but Hart died in May 1999 at Over the Edge. Later in the event, Debra and Jarrett lost a mixed tag team match against Nicole Bass and Val Venis. Debra and Jarrett were interviewed moments after Hart's fall from the rafters at Kemper Arena, where Debra was noticeably shaken and fighting back tears of concern for her friend and was unable to stay in her persona.

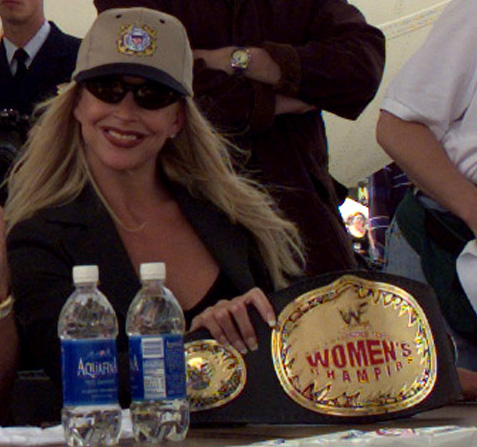
Debra as WWF Women's Champion in May 1999.

On May 2, 1999, Debra was scheduled to take on Sable in a 'Nightgown' match, but was made to compete against Nicole Bass, against whom she lost. On May 10, 1999, Debra won the WWF Women's Championship from Sable in an evening gown match. Usually, in an Evening Gown match, the woman who forcibly removes her opponent's dress wins. Because Sable removed Debra's dress, she therefore should have been the winner. Commissioner Shawn Michaels, however, ruled that he considered the woman who had lost her dress the winner, crowning Debra the new Women's Champion. She held the Women's title for a month and eventually lost it to Ivory on June 14, due to interference from Nicole Bass.

At SummerSlam in 1999 Jarrett faced D'Lo Brown. During the match, Debra and Brown's former tag-team partner Mark Henry interfered on Jarrett's behalf, allowing him to win both the European Championship and the Intercontinental Championship. The following night, Jarrett awarded Henry the European title and gave Debra an assistant, Miss Kitty. Following an attack by Jarrett after losing a mixed tag match against Stephanie McMahon and Test, on September 26, Debra turned on Jarrett at Unforgiven and hit him over the head with a guitar in the middle of his match against Chyna for the Intercontinental Championship. Chyna pinned Jarrett, but referee Tom Prichard overturned the decision due to Debra's involvement. On the following episode of RAW, Debra participated in an intergender tag match with Chyna against the team of Jarrett and Prichard, in a winning effort.

In November 1999, Debra participated in an eight-women Sudden Death match at Survivor Series where she teamed with The Fabulous Moolah, Mae Young, and Tori in a winning effort against Ivory, Jacqueline, Luna Vachon and Terri Runnels which also served as her last appearance as an in-ring performer, despite being trained at the time to compete.

==== Sporadic appearances (2000–2002) ====
From late-1999, Debra stayed off television while her husband Stone Cold Steve Austin recovered from neck surgery. She reappeared in April 2000, acting as a guest ring announcer at Backlash for the opening match. In the fall of that year she played the role of Lieutenant Commissioner, the assistant of Commissioner Mick Foley.

Debra resigned as Lieutenant Commissioner on the March 5, 2001 episode of Raw to pursue managing again, while it was revealed on-screen that she was the wife of Stone Cold. Vince McMahon subsequently gave her the duty of managing The Rock, who at the time was feuding with Stone Cold. During the feud, she appeared on an episode of RAW and slapped Vince McMahon. Although she was advertised to be involved in the Wrestlemania 17 main event match between The Rock and Stone Cold Steve Austin, she was later pulled due to both competitors lobbying not to have her out at ringside. After Wrestlemania, she returned on an episode of RAW, questioning Vince McMahon for his role in Stone Cold's villainous persona, and subsequently slapping him after he insulted her. During an episode of Smackdown, she appeared in a backstage segment and slapped The Undertaker, who was feuding with Austin at the time. By the second half of 2001, Debra accompanied Austin, as he defected to the Alliance, with a running gag about her famous chocolate chip cookies being repulsive (although Debra herself remained oblivious to this). On an episode of RAW, Debra was subject to a bucket of milk accidentally falling on her, which was a miscommunication by Stacy Keibler and Shawn Stasiak who meant to play the prank on Kurt Angle. The following week, Debra beat up Keibler with a tray of cookies in a backstage segment. In August, during an episode of Smackdown!, Debra also clocked Stone Cold in frustration with a cookie tray in the middle of the ring. The next week on RAW, she accompanied her husband to the ring for a match against Matt Hardy, and was involved in a physical altercation with Lita during the match.

In 2002, Debra was involved in a major backstage brawl with Stephanie McMahon after arguing over their respective husbands. Debra appeared sporadically thereafter in backstage segments, notably slapping Ric Flair in a backstage segment in April on an episode of RAW. She left the company in June 2002 after her last RAW appearance with Austin, fanning the flames of their well-publicized marital fallout.

Following domestic abuse charges against Austin and arrest, Austin eventually returned to WWE in 2003. Debra, however, was never invited back. References of Debra were subsequently dropped from WWE programming and media altogether, although, in 2021, she was acknowledged by WWE.com in a list of female performers who made an impact outside the ring.

== Other media ==
Before becoming involved in wrestling, Marshall studied acting in Texas. Her first acting jobs involved commercials and two music videos for country musician George Strait. She also had a small role in the 1995 film The Return of the Texas Chainsaw Massacre as a police officer. The producers originally offered her the lead in the film, but when the director's first choice changed her mind and accepted the role, Marshall was given the small role instead.

On March 10, 2002, Marshall appeared on an episode of The Weakest Link alongside several other members of the WWE roster. In addition, she has a role in the 2010 film Gathering of Heroes.

== Personal life ==
Marshall's marriage to National Football League alumnus and professional wrestler Steve McMichael lasted thirteen years. McMichael's mother, whom Marshall met on an airplane, set up their first meeting as a blind date. They divorced on October 12, 1998.

Debra met Steven Williams, known on-screen as Stone Cold Steve Austin, in 1998; they moved in together in 2000. On September 13 of that year, they married at The Little White Wedding Chapel in Las Vegas, and she changed her name to Debra Williams. On June 15, 2002, police responded to a call to the couple's residence in San Antonio, Texas, and found Debra with bruises and a bloody nose. On August 14, the authorities arrested Austin and charged him with misdemeanor assault. He pleaded no contest on November 25 and received a year's probation, a $1,000 fine, and an order to carry out eighty hours of community service. Austin filed for divorce from Marshall on July 22, 2002, and the divorce was finalized on February 5, 2003. Marshall later auctioned her wedding ring off on eBay for $27,100 and donated a portion of the proceeds to "Safe Place", an organization which assists the victims of domestic abuse.

In June and July 2007, Marshall made several appearances to discuss the Chris Benoit double-murder and suicide. She described steroids and drugs as the cause of Austin hitting her in June 2002 and suggested links between such substances and the death of Benoit and his family. She also alleged that Austin beat her three times.

Marshall graduated cum laude from the University of Alabama with an undergraduate interdisciplinary degree in 2013. In December 2017, she was awarded a Master of Science degree in criminal justice from the University of Alabama. While working on her master's of science degree, Marshall was awarded the University of Alabama College of Arts and Science's Mary Avis Todd Award for "outstanding work in community studies". After her graduation, Marshall found a job at the district attorney’s office in New Orleans, Louisiana.

== Championships and accomplishments ==
- Pro Wrestling Illustrated
  - PWI Manager of the Year (1999)
- World Wrestling Federation
  - WWF Women's Championship (1 time)
- Women's Wrestling Hall of Fame
  - Class of 2025

== Filmography ==
=== Film ===
Year	Title	Role	Notes
1995	The Return of the Texas Chainsaw Massacre	Cop at Bud's Pizza	
1999	Beyond the Mat	Herself	Documentary
2006	Just Another Romantic Wrestling Comedy	Dancer	Uncredited
2012	Tengu: The Immortal Blade	Captain Lang	
2018	Gathering of Heroes: Legend of the Seven Swords	Reina	

=== Television ===
Year	Title	Role	Notes
1999	Biography	Herself	Episode: "The Life and Death of Owen Hart"
1999	Teen Choice Awards	Presenter	
2001	Divas in Hedonism	Herself	Direct to DVD
2002	Mad TV	Herself	Episode 7.15
2002	Weakest Link	Herself	Episode: "WWF Superstars Edition 2"
2006	GMTV	Herself	1 episode
2007	At Large with Geraldo Rivera	Herself	1 episode
2007	Hannity & Colmes	Herself	3 episodes
2007	Inside Edition	Herself	1 episode

=== Video games ===
Year	Title	Role	Notes
1999	WWF WrestleMania 2000	Debra	Video game debut
2000	WWF Smackdown!	Debra	
2000	WWF Smackdown! Know Your Role	Debra	
2000	WWF No Mercy	Debra	
2001	WWF Smackdown! Just Bring It	Debra	Removed, unplayable
2002	WWE Smackdown! Shut Your Mouth	Debra	Non-playable character
