= Mary Swan =

Canadian novelist and short story writer

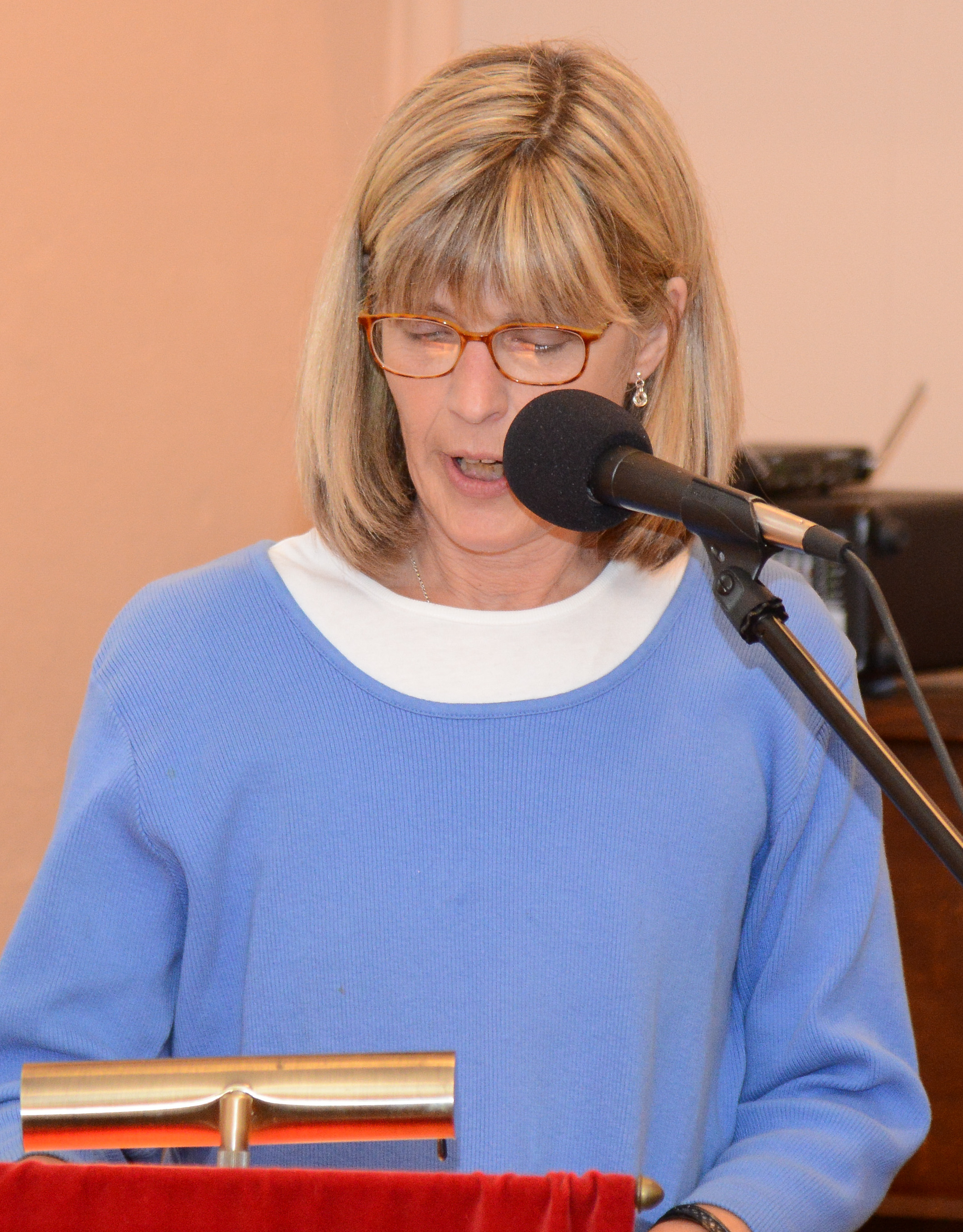
- Swan at the Eden Mills Writers' Festival in 2013

Mary Swan is a Canadian novelist and short story writer. She is also a trained librarian with a keen eye for history. Her novel The Boys in the Trees, a shortlisted nominee for the 2008 Scotiabank Giller Prize. was inspired by a newspaper clipping concerning a death within a family.

Swan was the winner of the 2001 O. Henry Award for short fiction for her short story "The Deep", which was published in The Malahat Review. That story later became the title story of her debut short story collection The Deep and Other Stories in 2002.

A graduate of York University and the University of Guelph, she currently resides in Guelph, Ontario with her family.

== Bibliography ==
- The Deep, The Porcupine's Quill, 2002, ISBN 0-88984-248-5
- Emma’s Hands, The Porcupine's Quill, 2003, ISBN 0-88984-268-X
- Boys in the Trees, Henry Holt and Company, 2008, ISBN 0-8050-8670-6
