= A Martinez =

American actor and singer (b. 1948)

- Born: Adolfo Larrue Martínez III; September 27, 1948 (age 78); Glendale, California, U.S.
- Occupations: Actor, singer
- Years active: 1968–present
- Spouses: Mare Winningham (m. 1981; div. 1981) Leslie Bryans (m. 1982)
- Children: 3

Adolfo Larrue Martínez III (born September 27, 1948), credited as A Martinez, is an American actor and singer. He had roles in the daytime soap operas Santa Barbara, General Hospital, One Life to Live, The Bold and the Beautiful, and Days of Our Lives, and the primetime dramas L.A. Law, Profiler, Longmire, and Dark Winds. His feature films include The Cowboys (1972), Powwow Highway (1989), Curse of Chucky (2013), Ambulance (2022), and Far Haven (2023).

== Early life and education ==
Martinez was born Adolfo Larrue Martínez III in Glendale, California. His family referred to him as "A", "Little Adolfo", and "Little A" as a child to distinguish him from his father and grandfather. Over time, "A" became the name he used. His heritage is Mexican and Apache on his father's side, and Piegan Blackfeet and Northern European on his mother's side.

Martinez attended Sunland Elementary School and Mt. Gleason Junior High School in Sunland/Tujunga, where he played Kiwanis youth softball each summer (he was a formidable pitcher) and starred in numerous school musical productions. He graduated from Verdugo Hills High School in Tujunga. In high school, he was in a rock band and on the track team.

After intending to study political science at UCLA, he turned to acting instead.

== Career ==
After graduating college, he played on a semi-pro baseball team for five seasons.

=== Film ===
Martinez has appeared in a number of feature films, including The Cowboys (1972), Starbird & Sweet William (1973), Once Upon a Scoundrel (1974), Joe Panther (1976), Shoot the Sun Down (1978), The Honorary Consul (1983), Walking the Edge (1985), Powwow Highway (1989), She-Devil (1989), The Cherokee Kid (1996), What's Cooking? (2000), Wind River (2000), Curse of Chucky (2013), Ambulance (2022) and Far Haven (2023).

=== Television ===
The majority of his acting roles have been on television. He had a significant appearance, playing the stable hand Luis, who aids Little Joe on the Bonanza episode "Gideon the Good" in 1970. Also in 1970 he appeared in the episode "Log 114--The Hero" on Adam-12. He had a recurring role on All in the Family as a helper at Archie's bar. In 1973, he appeared in the Hawaii Five-O episode "A Bullet for El Diablo". In 1974, he appeared in an episode of the short-lived ABC police drama Nakia. In 1976, he played a novice bullfighter in the Columbo episode "A Matter of Honor".

In January 1979, Martinez appeared as Tranquilino Marquez in three episodes of the mini-series Centennial. In February, 1979, he played a pre-med student in a two-part episode of Quincy, M.E., titled, "Walk Softly Through the Night". In March, 1979, Martinez made an appearance in the sixth season of Barney Miller, playing Claudio Ortiz in the episode "The DNA Story". He returned to Barney Miller in March, 1981, during season seven to portray Joseph Montoya in the episode "The Doll".

In 1982, Martinez played a grape picker in CBS's Falcon Crest, a 'lone wolf' Native American in the short-lived series Born to the Wind, and a police detective in the 1983–1984 series Whiz Kids. In 1983 he had a guest role in a Season 5 episode of Hart to Hart as Jose. From 1984 to 1992 he played the role of Cruz Castillo on the daytime soap opera Santa Barbara. Martinez has also worked on prime time television, including starring roles in series such as Profiler and L.A. Law.

In September 2008, Martinez joined the cast of the ABC daytime drama One Life to Live in the role of Ray Montez and was written out in June 2009.

In February 2011, Martinez appeared in several episodes of the CBS daytime drama The Bold and the Beautiful as Dr. Ramon Montgomery. He returned in January 2012 for a few additional episodes.

In 2012, he landed the recurring role of Jacob Nighthorse in the A&E Network television series Longmire.

In April 2014, it was rumored he was joining The Young and the Restless. In July 2014, he appeared on the NBC television show The Night Shift as Dr. Landry, de la Cruz's father. In late 2014, he also appeared in Othello on stage at the Odyssey Theatre in west Los Angeles.

From September 2015 to 2017, Martinez appeared on the NBC daytime drama Days of Our Lives as Eduardo "Eddie" Hernandez. He returned to the show in 2020.

In 2017, Martinez played Sheriff Mayo in the third season of the USA Network crime drama series Queen of the South.

In June 2022, Martinez was cast as Master Pakku in the Netflix live-action series Avatar: The Last Airbender.

Starting in 2023, he played Sheriff Gordo Sena in the second, third and fourth seasons of Dark Winds.

In 2025, Martinez joined the cast of the series Blue Ridge, managed under INSP Network and airing originally on the Cowboy Way Channel, now rebranded as Western Bound. Martinez plays the role of Connor McGrath and is part of its main ensemble. The first season premiered on the Cowboy Way Channel and later became available on Amazon Prime Video, where it became a sleeper hit, ranking among the service’s Top 10 most-watched shows. It returned in 2026 for its second season, where Martinez resumed his role of Connor McGrath.

== Awards ==
Over the years, Martinez has been nominated for numerous awards, and received some, including a Daytime Emmy Award, a Red Nation Film Award of Excellence, an award as Best Supporting Actor at the Red Dirt International Film Festival (for his own written short film called "Four Winds), and three from the Soap Opera Digest Awards.

== Personal life ==
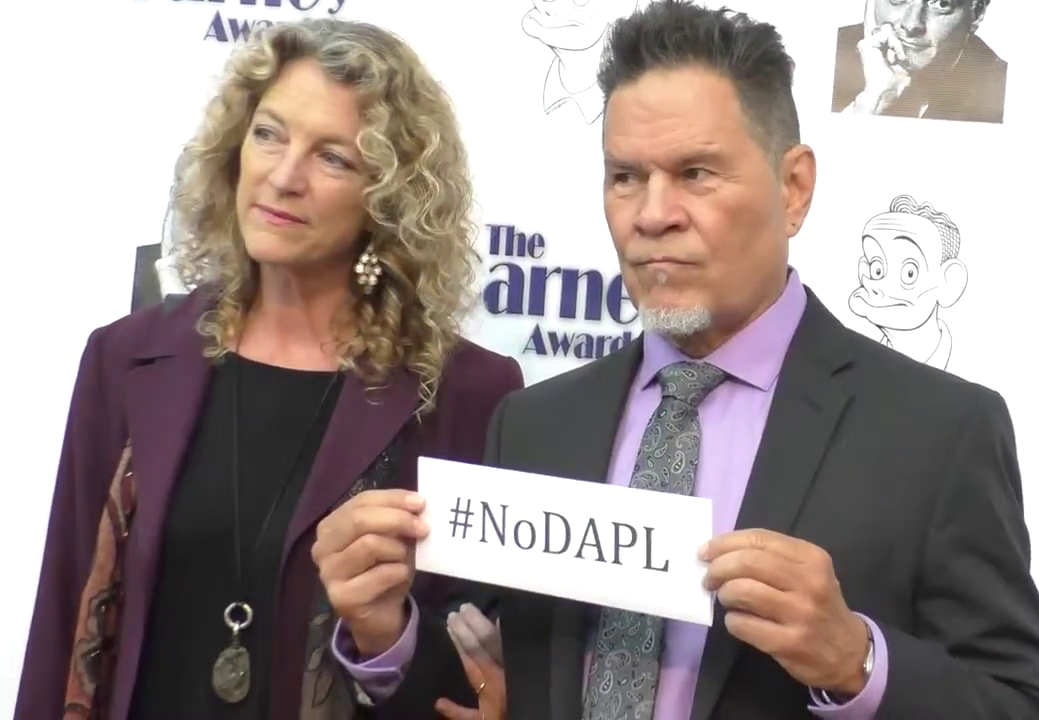
A Martinez and Leslie Bryans

In 1981, he was married briefly to actress Mare Winningham, who was also cast on the 1978 miniseries The Young Pioneers; they divorced later that year. In 1982, he married Leslie Bryans; they have a son and two daughters. He moved from Malibu to Thousand Oaks, California in 2014.

== Filmography ==
=== Film ===
Year	Title	Role(s)	Notes
1968	The Young Animals	Johnny	
1969	Change of Habit	Second Teen	Uncredited
1972	The Cowboys	Cimarron	
1973	Starbird and Sweet William	Starbird	
1973	Once Upon a Scoundrel	Luis Manuel	
1974	The Take	Tallbear	
1976	Joe Panther	Billy Tiger	
1978	Shoot the Sun Down	Sunbearer	
1983	The Honorary Consul	Aquino	
1985	Walking the Edge	Tony	
1989	Powwow Highway	Buddy Red Bow	
1989	She-Devil	Garcia	
1995	One Night Stand	Jack Gilman	
1997	Double Tap	Johnny Escobar	
2000	What's Cooking?	Daniel	
2001	Ordinary Sinner	Father Ed	
2005	Once Upon a Wedding	El Comandante	
2009	Fist of the Warrior	Anthony Black	
2009	The Terminators	Sheriff Carpenter	
2012	California Solo	Warren	
2012	California Winter	Miguel Morales	
2013	Four Winds	Old Man	Short film
2013	Jimmy P: Psychotherapy of a Plains Indian	Bear Willie Claw	
2013	Curse of Chucky	Father Frank	
2014	Before Your Eyes	Berto Galvan	Short film
2021	Symphoria	Carl Witting	
2022	Ambulance	Papi	
2023	Far Haven	Abraham	

=== Television ===
Year	Title	Role(s)	Notes
1969	The Outcasts	The Indian	Episode: "A Time of Darkness"
1969	Mission: Impossible	Young Man	Episode: "The Code"
1969	The New People	Gradis	Episode: "Murderer!"
1969	Ironside	Manolo Rodriguez	Episode: "The Machismo Bag"
1970	Hunters Are for Killing	Jimmy Ramirez	TV movie
1970	Adam-12	Lauro Perez	Episode: "Log 114: The Hero"
1970	Mannix	Pancho Salinas	Episode: "Time Out of Mind"
1970	Bonanza	Luís Valdez	Episode: "Gideon the Good"
1970–1971	Storefront Lawyers	Roberto Alvarez	Main cast
1971	The Smith Family	Ramon Sanchez	Episode: "Chicano"
1971	The Man and the City	Tony	Episode: "Reprisal"
1971	The Bold Ones: The Lawyers	Carlos Estrada	Episode: "Justice Is a Sometime Thing"
1972	The Streets of San Francisco	Rafael Diaz	Episode: "Hall of Minors"
1972	Probe	Carlos Lobos	TV movie
1972	The Sixth Sense	Billy	Episode: "Echo of a Distant Scream"
1973	Hawaii Five-O	Pepe Olivares	Episode: "A Bullet for El Diablo"
1973	Police Story	Bermudez	Episode: "Man on a Rack"
1974	The Cowboys	Cimarron	Main cast
1974	Nakia	George	Episode: "The Non-Person"
1974	Movin' On	Manolo Higgins	Episode: "The Cowhands"
1974–1975	Kung Fu	Tigre Cantrell	2 episodes
1975	McCloud	Larry Moreno	Episode: "Sharks"
1975	The Abduction of Saint Anne	Angel Montoya	ABC Movie of the Week
1975	Petrocelli	Mando Rivera	Episode: "The Gamblers"
1975–1976	The Streets of San Francisco	Officer Vega	Episode: "False Witness"
1975–1976	The Streets of San Francisco	Rudy Costa	Episode: "Alien Country"
1976	Columbo	Curro Rangel	Episode: "A Matter of Honor"
1976–1977	Barnaby Jones	Carlos Rojas	Episode: "Shadow of Guilt"
1976–1977	Barnaby Jones	Tomás Aguillar	Episode: "Deadly Homecoming"
1977	The Hardy Boys/Nancy Drew Mysteries	Henry Salazar	Episode: "Mystery of the Fallen Angels"
1977	Exo-Man	Raphael Torres	TV movie
1977	Wonderbug	Johnny Littlecloud	Episode: "Oil or Nothing"
1977	The Krofft Supershow	Johnny Littlecloud	Segment: "Wonderbug"
1977	All in the Family	Manuel	2 episodes
1977	Baretta	Frank	Episode: "Por nada"
1977	Police Woman	Dimi	Episode: "The Buttercup Killer"
1978	The Young Pioneers	Circling Hawk	Episode: "Sky in the Window"
1979	Centennial	Tranquillino Marquez	3 episodes
1979	The Incredible Hulk	Rick	Episode: "Kindred Spirits"
1979	Barnaby Jones	Tony Sierra	Episode: "Cry for Vengeance"
1979	Barney Miller	Claudio Ortez	Episode: "The DNA Story"
1979	B. J. and the Bear	Melendez	Episode: "The Murphy Contingent"
1979–1980	Quincy, M.E.	Dr. Tony Carbo	3 episodes
1980	Police Story: Confessions of a Lady Cop	Julio Mendez	TV movie
1981	The White Shadow	Officer Ramirez	Episode: "Cops"
1981	Barney Miller	Joseph	Episode: "The Doll"
1981	CHiPs	Dr. Rhodes	Episode: "A Simple Operation"
1981	Fantasy Island	Manuel Lopez	Episode: "Paquito's Birthday/Technical Advisor"
1982	American Playhouse	Juan	Episode: "Seguin"
1982	Cassie & Co.	Benny Silva	Main cast
1982	Falcon Crest	Julio Delgado	Episode: "Victims"
1983	Hart to Hart	Jose	Episode: "Straight Through the Hart"
1983–1984	Whiz Kids	Lt. Neal Quinn	Main cast
1984	Remington Steele	Guy Nickerson	Episode: "High Flying Steele"
1984	The Yellow Rose	Raoul Padilla	Episode: "Chains of Fear"
1984–1992	Santa Barbara	Cruz Castillo	Main cast
1989	Manhunt: Search for the Night Stalker	Lt. Gil Carillo	TV movie
1990	ABC Afterschool Specials	Emanuel Jensen	Episode: "Testing Dirty"
1990–1994	L.A. Law	Daniel Morales	Main cast (seasons 7–8)
1991	In the Nick of Time	Charlie Minsch	TV movie
1994	Deconstructing Sarah	Kenny	TV movie
1996	Touched by an Angel	Jon Mateos	Episode: "Rock 'n' Roll Dad"
1996	Grand Avenue	Steven	TV movie
1996	Sweet Dreams	Chief Doug Harrison	TV movie
1996	The Cherokee Kid	Juan Cortina	TV movie
1996–1997	Profiler	Agent Nick Cooper	Recurring role (seasons 1–2)
1997	Happily Ever After: Fairy Tales for Every Child	Emperor (voice)	Episode: "The Shoemaker and the Elves"
1998	Welcome to Paradox	Agent Rasheed Kay	Episode: "News from D Street"
1998	Last Rites	Matt Santos	TV movie
1999	The Magnificent Seven	Raphael Cordero Martinez	Episode: "Love and Honor"
1999	A Memory in My Heart	Joe Vega	TV movie
1999–2002	General Hospital	Roy DiLucca	Recurring role
2000	The Hunger	Peter Deutch	Episode: "The Falling Man"
2002–2003	For the People	Michael Olivas	Main cast
2003	Killer Instinct: From the Files of Agent Candice DeLong	Bobby	TV movie
2003	The Law and Mr. Lee	Anthony Delgado	TV movie
2005	JAG	Chief Aurelio Pudero	Episode: "JAG: San Diego"
2005–2007	CSI: Crime Scene Investigation	Danilo Zamesca	4 episodes
2006	Huff	Jorge Corrales	2 episodes
2006	Desolation Canyon	Arturo Zetta	TV movie
2007	Raines	Aurelio Sanchez	Episode: "Meet Juan Doe"
2007	Viva Laughlin	Armando	Episode: "What a Whale Wants"
2008	Little Girl Lost: The Delimar Vera Story	Angel Cruz	TV movie
2008–2009	One Life to Live	Ray Montez	Recurring role
2009	Criminal Minds	Bunting	Episode: "Retaliation"
2010	Miami Medical	Garrett	Episode: "An Arm and a Leg"
2010	Castle	César Calderón	Episode: "Anatomy of a Murder"
2011	Mega Python vs. Gatoroid	Dr. Diego Ortiz	TV movie
2011–2012	The Bold and the Beautiful	Ramon Montgomery	Recurring role
2012–2017	Longmire	Jacob Nighthorse	Recurring role
2014	The Night Shift	Joacquin De La Cruz	Episode: "Storm Watch"
2015	NCIS	Tomas Orlando	Episode: "Patience"
2015–2020	Days of Our Lives	Eduardo Hernandez	Recurring role
2018	Queen of the South	Sheriff Mayo	3 episodes
2019	Christmas on the Range	Brick McCree	TV movie
2021	Cowboy Bebop	Stax	Episode: "Blue Crow Waltz"
2023–present	Dark Winds	Sheriff Gordon Sena	Recurring role (seasons 2–present)
2024	Avatar: The Last Airbender	Master Pakku	2 episodes
2024	The Rookie	Gundo	2 episodes
2024–present	Blue Ridge	Connor McGrath	Main cast

=== Web ===
Year	Title	Role(s)	Notes
2014–present	The Bay	Nardo Ramos	Recurring role (season 1), main role (season 2-present)
