= Martin Kove =

American actor (born 1947)

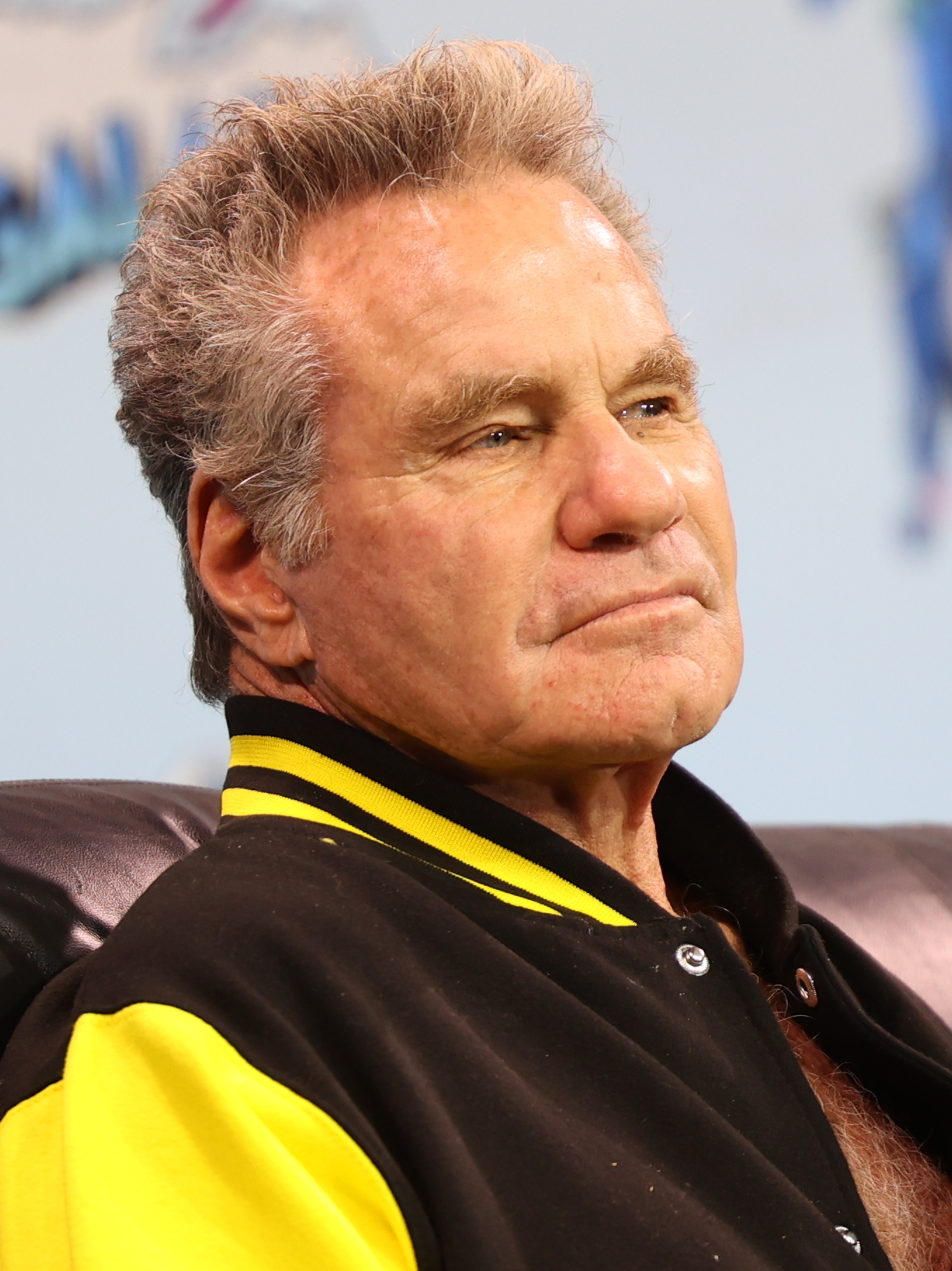
- Kove at GalaxyCon Columbus in 2024
- Born: March 6, 1947 (age 79); Brooklyn, New York, U.S.
- Education: NYU Tisch (dropped out)
- Occupation: Actor
- Years active: 1971–present
- Spouse: Vivienne Love (m. 1981; div. 2005)
- Children: 2

Martin Kove (/ˈkoʊv/; born March 6, 1947) is an American actor. He is best known for his role as John Kreese, the main antagonist of The Karate Kid (1984). Kove reprised the role in The Karate Kid Part II (1986), The Karate Kid Part III (1989), and the television series Cobra Kai (2018–2025). He was a regular on the television series Cagney & Lacey (1982–1988), portraying Police Detective Victor Isbecki. Kove also appeared in Rambo: First Blood Part II (1985) and Once Upon a Time in Hollywood (2019).

== Early life ==
Martin Kove was adopted into a Jewish family in Brooklyn, New York in 1947. His mother was a bookkeeper while his father worked in a hardware store. Kove has stated that his love for acting began during a fourth grade field trip to a play called "The Golden Goose." He stated: "That's when I got that feeling that you get on stage that this is for me." Kove attended Valley Stream Central High School before attending ITT Technical Institute – Maumee Campus.

== Career ==
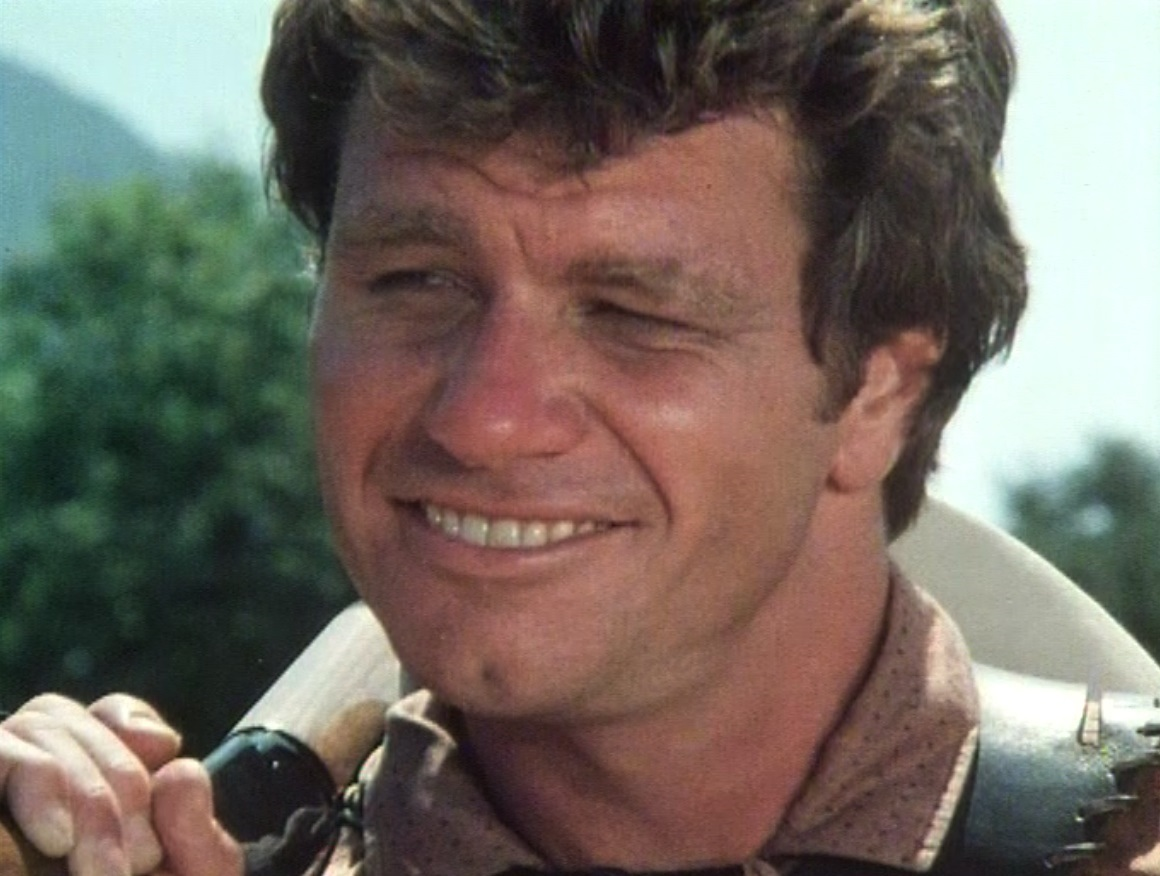
Kove in The Optimist (1983)

Kove then attended Queensborough Community College. However, their Drama department was very limited, so he would go around to different universities that had good drama departments and would audition for their plays despite not being enrolled at the schools producing them, sometimes getting the role and other times getting figured out. Kove worked only in community theater until he was 23, and subsequently accepted into the NYU School of the Arts. In 1971, Kove got a call to be a stand-in for Sean Connery in The Anderson Tapes. Upon meeting, he asked Connery whether he should build up a portfolio or continue with schooling. Connery responded: "Young man, if you can do the classics, you can do anything, why bother going back to school?"

Kove took Connery’s advice and quit school and his job working as a substitute math teacher at the Ward Melville High School, moving to Los Angeles to pursue his career in acting. From there, Kove continued to build up his portfolio with smaller roles in films such as Women in Revolt, Savages and Cops and Robbers. By 1975, with a number of movies and television spots under his belt, Kove joined the cast of Capone where he played Peter "Goosey" Gunsenburg also appearing in Death Race 2000. He got his first reoccurring role in the 1977 show Code R but it only lasted one season. From 1982 to 1988, Kove appeared in the main cast of Cagney & Lacey as New York City Detective Victor Isbecki.

In 1984, Kove appeared in the hit film The Karate Kid as Cobra Kai sensei John Kreese, whose fighting instruction of showing "no mercy" and to "sweep the leg" during the film's karate tournament entered the American zeitgeist. After playing a traitorous helicopter pilot in the 1985 film Rambo: First Blood Part II, he returned as Kreese for the 1986 sequel The Karate Kid Part II and the 1989 sequel The Karate Kid Part III. While shooting the car window punching scene for Part II, Kove actually had punched through the glass himself due to the special effects failing.

During the 1990s, Kove continued to appear in numerous films and TV shows such as TimeLock, Frank and Jesse, Project Shawdowchaser also starting in the war film Firehawk. He reprised his Cagney & Lacey role in four television films from 1994 to 1996. He made multiple appearances in the television shows Hard Time on Planet Earth, Renegade and Diagnosis Murder. In his only directorial effort, Kove directed a season 3 episode of Silk Stalkings entitled "These Stalkings are Too Hot" in 1994.

Kove studied Okinawa-te karate under prominent black belt Gordon Doversola Shihan. He has also trained in Kendo and Taekwondo and later on earned his black belt in Okinawa-te karate.

Kove continued making multiple appearances in films and television during the 2000s. He also appeared in the 2007 music video for the song "Sweep the Leg" by No More Kings as a caricature of himself and John Kreese from The Karate Kid.

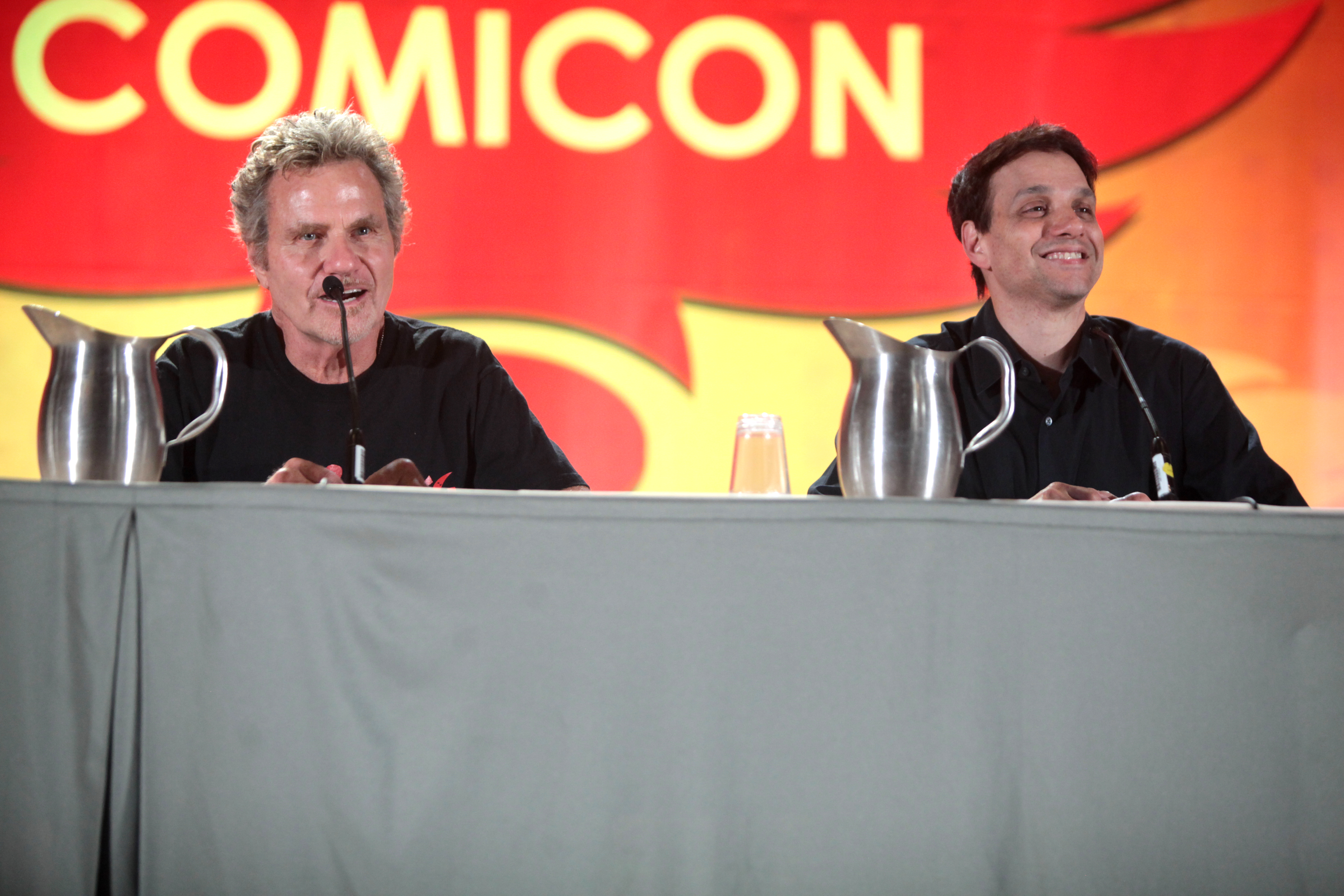
Kove alongside Ralph Macchio at a convention in 2016

In 2017, Kove appeared in an episode of The Goldbergs as master John, in reference to his role in The Karate Kid. The following year, Kove returned to the character of Kreese for the YouTube Premium web series Cobra Kai, a continuation of The Karate Kid franchise set 34 years after the original film. The series debuted on May 2, 2018, and was met with critical success. The show was renewed for a second season, which was published on April 24, 2019. In June 2020, Netflix purchased the series, producing a third, fourth, fifth, and sixth season.

In 2019, Kove parodied his Karate Kid character in a QuickBooks commercial, in which a kinder, gentler Kreese runs a "Koala Kai" dojo of preteen students who are encouraged to "support the leg" and to show "more mercy." Kove received praise for his role in the short film The Roommates taking home best supporting actor at the 2020 Oceanside International Film Festival. He also played a lead role in the 2019 film VFW and made an appearance in Once Upon a Time in Hollywood.

Kove was one of the celebrities competing on season 30 of Dancing with the Stars in 2021. He and his professional dance partner, Britt Stewart, were the first couple to be eliminated. In January 2022 Kove and his two children started a podcast which ran until June of that same year. He starred in the 2023 western film Far Haven and the 2024 film Fight Another day.

In May of 2025 the Tennessee General Assembly passed House Joint Resolution 677, celebrating Kove for his role in promoting martial arts via Cobra Kai and related projects.

== Personal life ==
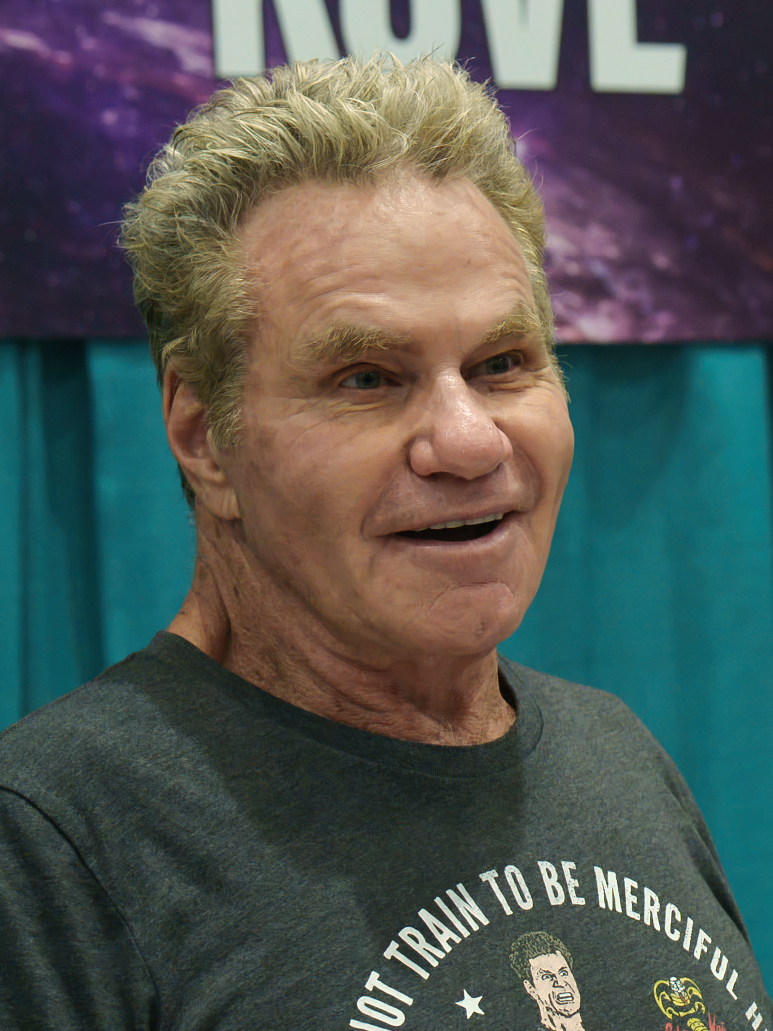
Kove at a convention in 2024

Kove is the father of twins, born in 1990. One of the twins, Jesse Kove, portrayed the young man who bullies the younger version of his father's character, John Kreese, in flashbacks for seasons 3 and 4 of Cobra Kai. He owns a 11-acre ranch near Nashville, Tennessee.

Kove has stated that he enjoys playing golf and riding horseback in his spare time, while also having a love for classic films such as old westerns. Kove works out and meditates regularly and still trains in karate; he has credited the sport for helping him maintain his focus, discipline and longevity.

In 2021, Kove participated in the "No Mercy on Stroke" (NMOS) campaign launched by the Society of Vascular and Interventional Neurology (SVIN) to raise public awareness about stroke symptoms and the importance of rapid response.

In March 2025, Kove announced that he partnered with La Casa Grande Cigars to start his own cigar line titled "The Prodigal Son", which was officially released in stores later that year in August.

== Filmography ==
Key
†	Denotes works that have not yet been released

=== Film ===
Year	Title	Role	Notes
1971	Little Murders	Unknown	Uncredited
1971	Women in Revolt	Marty	
1972	Savages	Archie	
1972	The Last House on the Left	Deputy Harry	
1973	Cops and Robbers	Ambulance Attendant	
1973	The Road Movie	Weigh Station Cop	
1974	The Groove Tube	Butz Beer	
1975	The Wild Party	Editor	
1975	Capone	Peter "Goosey" Gusenberg	
1975	Death Race 2000	Nero "The Hero"	
1975	White Line Fever	Clem	
1976	The Four Deuces	"Smokey" Ross	
1977	Mr. Billion	Texas Gambler	Uncredited
1977	The White Buffalo	Jack McCall	
1979	Seven	Skip	
1980	Laboratory	Gerard, Subject 32D	
1982	Blood Tide	Neil Grice	
1984	The Karate Kid	Sensei John Kreese	
1985	Rambo: First Blood Part II	Michael Reed Ericson	
1986	The Karate Kid Part II	Sensei John Kreese	
1987	Steele Justice	John Steele	
1989	The Karate Kid Part III	Sensei John Kreese	
1989	President's Target	Sam Nicholson	
1991	White Light	Sean Craig	
1992	Project Shadowchaser	DeSilva	Direct-to-video
1992	Shootfighter: Fight to the Death	Mr. Lee	
1993	Firehawk	Stewart	Direct-to-video
1993	Lightning in a Bottle	Duane Furber	
1993	The Outfit	Agent Baker	
1993	To Be the Best	Rick Kulhane	
1994	Wyatt Earp	Ed Ross	
1994	Endangered	DeVoe	
1994	Savage Land	Jabal	
1994	Frank and Jesse	Unknown	Uncredited
1994	Future Shock	Dr. Langdon	
1994	Death Match	Paul Landis	
1995	Renegade: Fighting Cage	Mitch Raines	Direct-to-video
1995	Grizzly Mountain	Marshal Jackson	
1995	Final Equinox	Torman	
1995	Without Mercy	Wolf Larsen	
1995	Baby Face Nelson	John Dillinger	
1996	Timelock	Admiral Danny Teegs	
1996	Mercenary	Mr. Phoenix	Direct-to-video
1996	Judge and Jury	Michael Silvano	
1997	Top of the World	Carl	
1997	Sliding Home	Samuel J. Weber	
1998	The Waterfront	James Ricks	
1998	Hyacinth	J.B. Walker	
1998	Joseph's Gift	Thompsonn	
2000	Nowhere Land	Hank	
2000	Strip 'n Run	Crow	
2000	Bad Guys	The Commander	
2000	A Drug Called Pornography	Narrator	Voice
2001	Final Payback	Captain Peter James	
2001	Black Scorpion Returns	Jack Ames	Direct-to-video
2001	Under Heavy Fire	Father Brazinski	
2001	Extreme Horror	Packard	
2001	Con Games	Timothy Redick	Direct-to-video
2001	Savage Season	Frank	
2002	Shattered Lies	Tom Reynolds	
2002	Crocodile 2: Death Swamp	Roland	
2002	American Gun	Theodore Huntley	
2002	Trance	Robert Leoni	
2002	Curse of the Forty-Niner	Caleb	
2002	Sting of the Black Scorpion	Jack Ames	Direct-to-video
2003	Devil's Knight	Zeff	Direct-to-video
2004	Illusion Infinity	Taxi Driver	
2004	Hollywood, It's a Dog's Life	The Clown	
2005	Glass Trap	Corrigan	
2005	Miracle at Sage Street	Jess	Deleted Scene(s)
2006	Seven Mummies	Kile	
2006	A-List	Red Carpet Star	
2006	Crooked	Jake Lawlor	
2006	Max Havoc: Ring of Fire	Lieutenant Reynolds	
2006	Fallen Angel's	Daniels	
2006	Exit 38	Reese	Direct-to-video
2007	No More King's: Sweep the Leg	Sensei Kreese	Music Video
2007	Messages	DCI Collins	
2007	Revamped	Detective Reeger	Direct-to-video
2007	The Dead Sleep Easy	Bob DePugh	
2007	Blizhniy Boy: The Ultimate Fighter	Detective Karpov	
2008	Beyond the Ring	Uncle Patrick	
2008	Man of a Thousand Faces	J. Carroll Naish	
2008	Chinaman's Chance: America's Other Slaves	Sheriff Jones	
2009	Immortally Yours	Steven Miles	
2009	Middle Men	Senator	
2009	Ballistica	Riley	
2010	Dante's Inferno: Abandon All Hope	Speaker: 8th Circle - The Sowers of Discord	
2010	Bare Knuckles	Sonny Cool	
2010	The Ascent	Lewis	
2011	Carmen's Kiss	Drayton	
2011	Memphis Rising: Elvis Returns	Highway Patrol	
2011	The Great Fight	John Cooper	
2011	Dark Games	Detective Dave Reinhart	
2011	Savage	Jack Lund	
2011	The Life Zone	Randy Graves	
2011	Silent but Deadly	Hodge	
2013	Reality Terror Night	Othello Lazarus	
2013	I'm in Love with a Church Girl	Terry Edgemond	
2013	Friend Request	Captain Meyers	
2013	Jet Set	John	
2014	Falcon Song	Caspian	
2014	Eternity: The Movie	Barry Goldfield Sr.	
2014	Red Sky	Navy Intel Commander	
2014	Tapped Out	Principal Vanhorne	
2014	Stuff It	Big Hank	Short Film
2014	Number Runner	Bingo Brown	Direct-to-video
2014	Snapshot	Jack Adams	
2014	Rice Girl	Captain Ron Williams	
2014	The Extendables	Aye Lewis	
2014	As Night Comes	Projectionist	
2014	Tumbleweed: A True Story	Silver Bush	
2015	The End	John Doe	Short film
2015	The Dog Who Saved Summer	Vernon	
2015	Hardin	Mannen Clements Sr.	
2015	Running Forever	Carson	
2015	The Shadow	Will Troncalli	Short film
2016	Beyond the Gates	James Star	
2016	Wild Bill Hickok: Swift Justice	Rayord	
2016	Traded	Cavendish	
2016	Jokers Wild	Graham Palace	
2016	Six Gun Savior	The Mentor	
2016	Assassin X	Frank	
2016	Hospital Arrest	Boss Nigel	
2017	Garlic and Gunpowder	Agent Tracey	
2017	Price For Freedom	Ayotollah Khalkhali	
2017	Fake News	Vice President John Phillips	
2017	Bring Me A Dream	Sheriff Jack Miller	
2018	Gathering of Heroes: Legend of the Seven Swords	Galaron	
2018	Ellen Bond Secret Agent	Colonel Rachmann	Short film
2018	Show No Mercy	Frank	Short film
2018	Warning: No Trespassing	Marty the CIA agent	
2018	Paint It Red	Scabs	
2019	The Savant	John Sonsay	
2019	Once Upon a Time in Hollywood	Sheriff on Bounty Law	
2019	VFW	Lou Clayton	
2019	A Karate Christmas Miracle	Sam	
2019	D-Day: Battle of Omaha Beach	Nicholas	
2019	Bare Knuckle Brawler	Mike Calderon	
2020	Elvis From Outer Space	State Trooper	
2020	Finding Sara	Lemley	
2020	Max Reload and the Nether Blasters	Gramps Jenkins	
2020	Day 13	Magnus	
2020	A Wrestling Christmas Miracle	Warden Jeffries	
2021	3 Tickets to Paradise	Felix	
2023	Far Haven	Ambrose Masse	
2024	Fight Another Day	Fischer	
2024	Queen of the Ring	Al Haft	
2024	Dark Night of the Soul	Dad	
2024	The Cobra Kai Movie	Himself	Short film
2025	Killing Mary Sue	Knox	
2026	The Dink	Mitch	

=== Television ===
Year	Title	Role	Notes
1974	The Wild World of Mystery	Rollo	Episode: "The Spy Who Returned From The Dead"
1974	Police Story	Officer #2	Episode: "Chief"
1974	McCloud	Punk (Uncredited)	Episode: "This Must Be The Alamo"
1974	McMillan & Wife	Joe Smith	Episode: "Downshift to Danger"
1974	Rhoda	Gary	Episode: "Anything Wrong"
1974	Gunsmoke	Guthrie	Episode: "In Performance of Duty"
1975	Three for the Road	Unknown	Episode: "The Rip-off"
1975	Switch	Bud	Episode: "The Deadly Missiles Caper"
1975	The Rookies	Jimmy Jay	Episode: "Measure of Mercy"
1976	Kojak	Burl Stole	Episode: "Law Dance"
1976	The November Plan	Stan	Television film
1976	City of Angels	Stan	3 episodes
1976	Petrocelli	Frank Harris	Episode: "Six Strings of Guilt"
1976	Kingston: Confidential	Dealey	Episode: "Kingston"
1976	The Streets of San Francisco	Willis Hines	Episode: "The Drop"
1977	The Rockford Files	Harry Smick	Episode: "Dirty Money, Black Light"
1977	The Hardy Boys/Nancy Drew Mysteries	Pete Miller	Episode: "Mystery of the Solid Gold Kicker"
1977	Code R	George Baker	12 episodes
1977	The San Pedro Beach Bums	Denny Evans	Episode: "The Shortest Yard"
1977	Charlie's Angels	George	Episode: "Sammy Davis, Jr. Kidnap Caper"
1977–1978	We've Got Each Other	Ken Redford	6 episodes
1978	The Incredible Hulk	Henry "Rocky" Welsh	Episode: "Final Round"
1978–1979	Barnaby Jones	Greg Saunders / Stan Benson	2 episodes
1979	Donovan's Kid	Kelso	Television film
1979	Quincy, M.E.	Joe	Episode: "The Death Challenge"
1979	Starsky & Hutch	Jimmy Lucas	Episode: "Birds of a Feather"
1979	The Magical World of Disney	Hoover	Episode: "The Sky Trap / Trampa en el cielo"
1979	The Runaway's	Mike	Episode: "Dreams of My Father"
1979	CHiPs	Joe Kirby	Episodes: "The Volunteers", "The Death Challenge", "Hot Wheels"
1979	A Man Called Sloane	Undisclosed Role	Episode: "Lady Bug"
1980	Tenspeed and Brown Shoe	Hell Hound Leader	Episode: "Savage Says: What Are Friends For?"
1980	Trouble In High Timber County	Willie Yeager	Television film
1980	Beyond Westworld	Jack Edwards	Episode: "Take-Over"
1980–1981	The Edge of Night	Romeo Slade	16 episodes
1982	Cry for the Strangers	Jeff	Television film
1982–1988	Cagney & Lacey	Victor Isbecki	Main role
1983	The Optimist	The Rival	Episode: "The Good, The Bad, and the Nasty"
1985	Murder, She Wrote	Gary Ellison	Episode: "Armed Response"
1985	Wildside	Lyle Rainwood	Episode: "Don't Keep the Home Fires Burning"
1985	The Twilight Zone	Joe	Episode: "Opening Day"
1988	Higher Ground	Rick Loden	Television film
1989	Hard Time on Planet Earth	Jesse	13 episodes
1993	Without a Kiss Goodbye	Sheriff Harding	Television film
1993	Renegade	Mitch Raines / Goliath	2 episodes
1993	Tales from the Crypt	Police Officer	Episode: "Half-Way Horrible"
1993–1994	Kung Fu: The Legend Continues	Chi'Ru Master	2 episodes
1994	Burke's Law	Joe Tanner	2 episodes
1994	Wyatt Earp: Return to Tombstone	Ed Ross	Television film
1994	The Gambler V: Playing for keeps	Black Jack	Television film
1994	Cagney & Lacey: The Return	Victor Isbecki	Television film
1995	Walker, Texas Ranger	Fred Kimble	Episode: "Flashback"
1995	Hercules: The Legendary Journeys	Demetrius	Episode: "The Mother of All Monsters"
1997	Assault on Devil's Island	Andy Powers	Television film
1998	V.I.P.	Mr. Scornabacho	Episode: "Bloody Val-entine"
1998–1999	Diagnosis: Murder	Captain Walter Newman	3 episodes
1999	Assault on Death Mountain	Andy Powers	Television film
2001	Under Heavy Fire	Father Brazinski	Television film
2001	Black Scorpion	James Aimes / Firearm	Episode: "Armed and Dangerous"
2002	Gentle Ben	Cully	Television film
2003	Gentle Ben 2: Black Gold	Cully	Television film
2003	Hard Ground	Floyd	Television film
2003	Barbarian	Munkar	Television film
2004	Alien Lockdown	Anslow	Television film
2004	Hollywood Mom's Mystery	Sandy Palumbo	Television film
2009	War Wolves	Malick	Television film
2011	Tosh.0	John Kreese	Episode: "Broad Breaker"
2011	NTSF:SD:SUV::	Cell Leader	Episode: "The Risky Business of Being Alone in Your Home"
2012	Smokewood	Rex Burnett	Television film
2013	Our Wild Hearts	Grizz	Television film
2013	Sketchy	Undisclosed Role	Episode: "It Doesn't Get Better"
2015	Criminal Minds	John Folkmore	Episode: "Scream"
2016	2 Lava 2 Lantula!	Colonel Jester	Television film
2017	The Goldbergs	Master John	Episode: "The Kara-Te Kid"
2017	Bloodlands	Sheriff Lonnie Dugan	Episode: "Pilot"
2018–2025	Cobra Kai	John Kreese	Guest role (season 1); main role (seasons 2–6)
2021	Gravesend	Murray Zorwitz	2 episodes
2021	Dancing with the Stars	Himself / Contestant	Season 30
2024	A Taste of Love	Glenn	Television film (Hallmark)
2024	The Roommates	Jerry	Episode: "The Magic Show"

=== Video games ===
- Cobra Kai 2: Dojos Rising (2022) as John Kreese (voice role)

== Awards and nominations ==
Year	Award	Category	Film/work	Result
2007	Golden Boot Awards	significant contributions to the genre of Westerns in television and film	Himself	Won
2009	Atlantic City Cinefest	Lifesaver achievement	Himself	Won
2013	Hoboken International Film Festival	Best supporting actor	Ascent	Won
2015	Festival of Globe	Best actor	Price for Freedom	Won
2016	Hoboken International Film Festival	Lifetime Achievement in Acting	Himself	Won
2019	Hoboken International Film Festival	Hall of Fame	Himself	Won
2019	Brooklyn Horror Film Festival	Best actor	VFW	Won
2020	Catalina Film Festival	Career achievement	Himself	Won
2020	Oceanside International Film Festival	Best supporting actor	The Roommates	Won
2020	Idyllwild International Festival	Best supporting actor in a Feature Film	Bring Me a Dream	Nominated
2020	Idyllwild International Festival	Best ensemble cast Feature Film (shared)	Bring Me a Dream	Nominated
2021	Northern Virginia International Film and Music Festival	Best actor in a short film	The Roommates	Nominated
2021	Northern Virginia International Film and Music Festival	Best acting ensemble (shared)	The Roommates	Won
2021	The Southern California International Film Festival	Best acting ensemble (shared)	The Roommates	Won
2022	Golden Reel International Film Festival	Best ensemble	America's Other Slaves	Won
2023	Sunscreen Film Festival	Lifetime Achievement	Himself	Won
2024	Walk of Western Stars	Awarded a bronze square in Newhall	Contributions to Western Films	Won
2025	Saturn Awards	Best guest star in television series	Cobra Kai	Nominated
