= List of Fantastic Fest editions =

Breakdown of Fantastic Fest editions by year, with premieres, awards and nominees.

== 2005 ==
The 2005 festival was only three days long, October 6–9. Screened films included Feast, Wolf Creek, and Zathura. The official sponsors of the 2005 festival were Milkshake Media, KOOP Radio, The Austin Chronicle, Jackson Walker LLP, and Independence Brewery.

U.S. premieres

- Hakugei: Legend of the Moby Dick

Texas premieres

- The Big White
- The Birthday
- Creep
- The Dark Hours
- G.O.R.A.
- Malefique
- Marebito
- Night of the Living Dorks
- P
- Pulse
- Strings
- The Wild Blue Yonder
- Wolf Creek

=== Special screenings ===
- Sneak preview of Feast
- Work-in-progress sneak preview of Hostel
- Sneak preview of the recut and extended version of Sin City
- Sneak preview of Zathura
- A Scanner Darkly

=== Retrospective screenings ===
The theme of the 2005 retrospective series was "Post Apocalyptic Cinema".

- The Last Wave
- Miracle Mile
- No Blade of Grass
- 1990: The Bronx Warriors

=== Special events ===
The special effects team from The Lion, the Witch and the Wardrobe installed a display of costumes, creatures and props from the Narnia film. Legendary makeup and effects supervisor Howard Berger presided over a special effects Q&A.

== 2006 ==
The 2006 festival was expanded to 8 days and held September 21–28.

World premiere

- Roman with Q&A by director Angela Bettis and star Lucky McKee

U.S. premieres

- Gamerz
- Isolation
- Lie Still with Q&A by director Sean Hogan
- The Living and the Dead with Q&A by director Simon Rumley
- The Woods
- Blood Trails
- Broken
- The Host
- Blood Tea and Red String
- Frank and Wendy
- Bug with Q&A by star Michael Shannon
- The Hamster Cage with Q&A by director Larry Kent
- Venus Drowning

Texas premieres

- Abominable
- The Beach Party at the Threshold of Hell
- The District!
- Firefly
- Frostbite
- The Glamorous Life of Sachiko Hanai
- Hatchet with Q&A by director Adam Green
- Inside with Q&A by director Jeff Mahler
- The Last Supper
- Funky Forest (aka Naisu No Mori)
- Nightmare
- Origin: Spirits of the Past
- The Piano Tuner of Earthquakes
- Puzzlehead
- A Quiet Love
- Renaissance
- Severance
- Shinobi: Heart Under Blade
- Shiva
- Simon Says with Q&A with star Crispin Glover
- Starfish Hotel
- Unrest
- Wilderness
- Zhest

=== Special screenings ===
- An unfinished version of Apocalypto, followed by a Q&A with Mel Gibson and star Rudy Youngblood
- Pan's Labyrinth; director Guillermo del Toro was unable to attend but sent along a written introduction for the audience
- Advance screening of Beowulf & Grendel
- Advance screening of Terry Gilliam's Tideland
- Advance screening of The Fountain with Q&A by director Darren Aronofsky
- Advance screening of Edmond
- Advance screening of The Texas Chainsaw Massacre: The Beginning

=== Retrospective screenings ===
There were three retrospective series. The first paid homage to cult midnight films and included:

- Parasite 3-D
- Northville Cemetery Massacre
- The Texas Chain Saw Massacre with Q&A by star Edwin Neal ("The Hitchhiker")
- A Nightmare on Elm Street
- Fantastic Planet presented by Darren Aronofsky

The second was presented by cult author Jack Stevenson and included:

- A compilation of films depicting drugs in American film
- Scandinavian Sinema, a presentation of postwar Scandinavian erotic cinema
- Haxan: Witchcraft Through the Ages

And the third was a retrospective of the action/crime films of director Ram Gopal Varma, featuring:

- Ab Tak Chhappan
- Company
- Ek Hasina Thi

There was also Meltdown Memoirs, a documentary about the making of Street Trash, which also played.

=== Award winners ===
Horror Jury Awards, for excellence in the horror genre

- Best Picture – Isolation
- Best Director – Billy O'Brien, for Isolation
- Best Script – Dylan Bank and Morgan Pehme for Nightmare
- Best Actor – Kane Hodder for Hatchet
- Best Actress – Nicole Roderick for Nightmare
- Best Supporting Actor – Lance Henriksen for Abominable
- Best Supporting Actress – Kristen Bell for Roman
- Best Art Direction – Alex Boynton for Unrest
- Best Cinematography – Robby Ryan for Isolation
- Best Special Effects – Hatchet
- Best Make-up – Broken

Serving on the horror jury were Jay Slater of FilmThreat.com, Edwin Neal of The Texas Chain Saw Massacre, Peter Martin of Twitch.com, and Chris Cargill of AintItCoolNews.com.

Short Film Jury Awards

- Best of Show – The Listening Dead
- Best Short-Form – Cost of Living
- Best Long-Form – Rogairi (Villains)
- Best Animated – If I Had a Hammer
- Best Comedy – They're Made Out of Meat

Serving on the Short Film Jury were Brian Satterwhite, Jay Knowles and Chris Cargill, all of AintItcoolNews.com.

Fantastic Fest Jury Awards, for excellence in films outside the horror genre

- Best Film — The Living and the Dead
- Best Director — Simon Rumley for The Living and the Dead
- Best Script — Larry Kent and Daniel Williams for The Hamster Cage
- Best Actor — Leo Bill from The Living and the Dead
- Best Actress — Jodie Jameson from Venus Drowning
- Best Supporting Actor — Alan Scarfe from The Hamster Cage
- Best Supporting Actress — Kate Fahy from The Living and the Dead
- Best Art Direction — Starfish Hotel
- Best Cinematography — A Quiet Love
- Best Special Effects — Puzzlehead
- Best Makeup — The Living and the Dead
- Special Jury Mention — Blood Tea and Red String

Serving on the Fantastic Fest Jury Awards were Christian Hallman of the Lund International Fantastic Film Festival, Wiley Wiggins of Dazed and Confused and Waking Life, and Scott Weinberg of Fearnet and Cinematical.com.

Audience Awards

- 1st Place – Hatchet
- 2nd Place – Isolation
- 3rd Place – Firefly

=== Highlights ===
- A notable highlight for the audience occurred when Mel Gibson walked into the theater.
- Closing night party was Undead Till Dawn, a vampire-themed dance party
- There was a special screening timed with the release of 42nd STREET FOREVER VOLUME 5: ALAMO DRAFTHOUSE EDITION where every trailer was shown in 35mm

== 2007 ==
The 2007 festival was held September 20–27. In 2007, Fantastic Fest became a supporting member of the Melies European Federation of Fantastic Film Festivals and helped to found the North American Fantastic Festival Alliance, along with Fantasia International Film Festival in Montreal and Dead Channels in San Francisco. The official sponsors of the 2007 Fantastic Fest were AMD, Stella Artois, AT&T, Twitch.com, B-Side, Rue Morgue, Fangoria, and Mondo Macabro.

World premieres

- There Will Be Blood, with a Q&A by director Paul Thomas Anderson
- Los Cronocrímenes (Timecrimes), with director Nacho Vigalondo in attendance (Timecrimes was purchased out of the festival by Magnolia Films for theatrical distribution, and remake rights were purchased by United Artists.)

U.S. premieres

- Alone
- The Backwoods
- The Devil's Chair
- Diary of the Dead with Q&A by director George A. Romero
- Flash Point
- Hell's Fever
- La Hora Fria (The Cold Hour)
- Inside
- Invisible Target
- Maiko Haaaan!!!
- Mirageman with Q&A by director Ernesto Diaz Espinoza and action star Marko Zaror
- Rug Cop
- Summer Scars
- Wolfhound
- Wrong Turn 2: Dead End with Q&A by director Joe Lynch

Texas premieres

- Aachi & Ssipak
- The Beautiful Beast
- Blood, Boobs, and Beast
- Death Note
- Death Note 2: The Last Name
- Devil's Helper: The Folk Art Films of Phil Chambliss
- A Dirty Carnival
- Dog Bite Dog
- End of The Line
- The Entrance
- Exte: Hair Extensions
- The Ferryman
- Finishing the Game
- Five Across The Eyes
- Flight of the Living Dead
- The Girl Next Door
- The Girl Who Leapt Through Time
- Hell's Ground
- Kiltro with Q&A by director Ernesto Díaz Espinoza and star Marco Zaror
- The Last Winter
- Moebius Redux: A Life In Pictures with Q&A by director Hasko Baumann
- Never Belongs To Me
- Offscreen
- Postal with Q&A by director Uwe Boll and actor Zack Ward
- Princess
- Retribution
- Sex and Death 101
- Son of Rambow
- Spiral
- The Sword Bearer
- Taxidermia
- Uncle's Paradise (the food/film feature of the year)
- Weirdsville
- Wicked Flowers

=== Special screenings ===
- Southland Tales, the world premiere of the final version after heavy edits, with Q&A by director Richard Kelly
- Persepolis
- Dai Nipponjin (Big Man Japan)
- El Orfanto (The Orphanage), with Q&A by director Juan Antonio Bayona

=== Retrospective screenings ===
The Nikkatsu action series featured films mainly never before shown theatrically in the U.S.:

- Velvet Hustler
- The Warped Ones
- A Colt Is My Passport
- Crazy Thunder Road

=== Award winners ===
AMD Next Wave Award, for excellence by an up-and-coming filmmaker

- Gold Medal – Los Cronocrímenes (TimeCrimes)
- Silver Medal – Spiral
- Bronze Medal – Mirageman
- Special Jury Prize for Innovative Vision – End of the Line

Horror Jury Award, for excellence in the horror genre

- Gold Medal – Exte (Hair Extensions)
- Silver Medal – Alone
- Bronze Medal – The Devil's Chair

Fantastic Fest Jury Award, for excellence outside of the horror genre

- Gold Medal – Offscreen
- Silver Medal – Never Belongs to Me
- Bronze Medal – Aachi and Ssipak
- Special Jury Prize for Most Original Scenario – Never Belongs to Me

Horror Shorts Award

- Gold Medal – "In the Wall"
- Silver Medal – "The Fifth"
- Bronze Medal – "Far Out"

Animated Shorts Award

- Gold Medal – "Everything Will Be OK"
- Silver Medal – "Raymond"
- Bronze Medal – "X-Pression"

Fantastic Shorts Award

- Gold Medal – "Waiting For Yesterday"
- Silver Medal – "Sniffer"
- Bronze Medal – "Suityman"

Audience Award

- Gold Medal – Mirageman
- Silver Medal – TimeCrimes
- Bronze Medal – Jack Ketchum's The Girl Next Door

=== Highlights ===
- Shooting shotguns with the Next Wave directors
- Impromptu karaoke party and Fantastic Feud game show
- Watching pornography (Japanese pinku Uncle's Paradise) in the front yard of festival director Tim League's house
- Q&A by director Uwe Boll and star Zack Ward after a screening of Postal

== 2008 ==
Fantastic Fest 2008 was held September 18–25.

World premieres

- Feast 2: Sloppy Seconds, with director John Gulager and most of the cast in attendance
- Santos, with director Nicolás López in attendance
- Seventh Moon, with director Eduardo Sanchez and stars Amy Smart and Tim Chiou in attendance
- Zombie Girl: The Movie

US premieres

- Acolytes with director Jon Hewitt in attendance
- Art of the Devil 3
- Sauna
- Deadgirl with directors Gadi Harel and Marcel Sarmiento in attendance.

Texas premieres

- Alien Raiders
- Astropia
- The Burrowers
- Cargo 200
- The Chaser
- Chocolate
- La Creme
- Dark Floors
- Doctor Infierno
- Donkey Punch
- Estomago: A Gastronomic Story (food/film event)
- Ex Drummer
- Fanboys
- Fear(s) of the Dark
- Fighter
- Gachi Boy: Wrestling With a Memory
- The Good, The Bad, the Weird
- How To Get Rid of Others
- I Think We're Alone Now
- Jack Brooks: Monster Slayer
- JCVD
- Just Another Love Story
- Late Bloomer
- Left Bank
- Let The Right One In
- Martyrs
- Muay Thai Chaiya
- Pulse 2: Afterlife
- Repo! The Genetic Opera
- Rule of Three
- South of Heaven
- Spine Tingler — The William Castle Story
- The Substitute
- Surveillance with Q&A by director Jennifer Lynch
- Terra
- Tokyo!
- Tokyo Gore Police
- Vinyan
- Wicked Lake
- The Wild Man of the Navidad
- The Wreck
- Your Name Here

=== Special screenings ===
- Zack and Miri Make a Porno (opening night film) with guest director Kevin Smith in attendance (followed by the Air Sex World Championships)
- The Brothers Bloom, with director Rian Johnson in attendance
- Appaloosa
- Eagle Eye (with road rally scavenger hunt)
- Role Models, with Paul Rudd and David Wain in attendance
- RocknRolla
- City of Ember (closing night film), with Bill Murray and Gil Kenan in attendance

=== Retrospective screenings ===
There was an Ozploitation retrospective featuring Australian exploitation films from the '70s and '80s:

- Dark Age
- Mad Max
- The Man from Hong Kong
- Razorback
- Road Warrior, shown on an outdoor screen in the parking lot
- Turkey Shoot

And the documentary Not Quite Hollywood about Ozploitation in the golden age.

There was also a sampling of Japanese "pinku" titles, including

- Blue Film Woman
- Gushing Prayer
- A Lonely Cow Weeps at Dawn
- S&M Hunter

=== Award winners ===
AMD Next Wave Award for excellence by an up-and-coming filmmaker

- Gold Medal – Tokyo Gore Police
- Silver Medal – Deadgirl
- Bronze Medal – La Creme

AMD Fantastic Fest Online

- Best Feature Film – South of Heaven
- Best Short Film – Treevenge

Horror Features, for excellence in the horror genre

- Gold Medal – Let the Right One In
- Silver Medal – Acolytes
- Bronze Medal – Donkey Punch
- Special Jury Award for most politically incorrect gore – Feast 2
- Special Jury Award for best use of latex – Jack Brooks: Monster Slayer

Fantastic Features, for excellence outside of the horror genre

- Gold Medal – How to Get Rid of Others
- Silver Medal – Cargo 200
- Bronze Medal – Ex Drummer
- Special Jury Award for originality and vision – Santos

Horror Shorts

- Gold Medal – "Electric Fence"
- Silver Medal – "I Love Sarah Jane"
- Bronze Medal – "El Senor Puppe"
- Special Jury Award – "The Horribly Slow Murderer with the Extremely Inefficient Weapon"

Fantastic Shorts

- Gold Medal – "The Object"
- Silver Medal – "Spandex Man"
- Bronze Medal – "Stagman"
- Special Jury Award for Visual Invention – "Rojo Red"

Animated Shorts

- Gold Medal – "Bernie's Doll"
- Silver Medal – "Muto"
- Bronze Medal – "Violeta"
- Special Jury Award for Technical Merit – "The Facts in the Case of Mr. Hollow"

=== Highlights ===
- Director Nacho Vigalondo covering his face with honey and shooting himself with a confetti cannon following the screening of his short films.
- The "shaky-face" badge photos required attendees to submit a picture of themselves taken while violently shaking their heads back and forth. This resulted in some very unusual portraits.
- The Fantastic Debates pitted film lovers against one another in spirited arguments about "Horror Remakes — Reinvented Classics, or Modern Abominations" and the like. Debators unable to resolve their differences with words then stepped into the boxing ring to settle things with fists.
- Closing party, sponsored by the film City of Ember was held at Longhorn Caverns. Bill Murray attended.
- 100 Best Kills Party
- Donkey Punch Boat Party
- The Fantastic Feud (Team USA wins!)
- Michael Jackson: Thrill the World, an attempt to break the world record for largest synchronized Thriller dance
- Smokin' Karaoke Apocalypse Party 2008, with live band karaoke

== 2009 ==
The 2009 festival was held September 24 – October 1. It was the first year of the Fantastic Fest Lifetime Achievement Award, which was given to director Jess Franco. The official sponsors of the 2009 Fantastic Fest were Real D, G4, Dark Sky Films, Best Buy, Stella Artois, Jeremiah Weed, Ain't It Cool News, and Alamo Drafthouse Cinema.

World premieres

- Zombieland, with a Q&A by director Ruben Fleischer and stars Woody Harrelson, Jesse Eisenberg, and Emma Stone
- Gentlemen Broncos (opening night film), with a Q&A by director Jared Hess and stars Jemaine Clement, Michael Angarano Sam Rockwell, and Mike White
- Universal Soldier: Regeneration, with Q&A by star Dolph Lundgren
- REC 2
- Down Terrace with Q&A by director Ben Wheatley
- First Squad
- Macabre
- Mandrill with Q&A by director Ernesto Diaz Espinoza and action star Marko Zaror

U.S. premieres

- Antichrist
- Daybreakers, with Q&A by star Dolph Lundgren
- Survival of the Dead, with Q&A by director George A. Romero
- Human Centipede, with Q&A by director Tom Six
- Doghouse, with Q&A by director Jake West
- Smash Cut
- RoboGeisha
- Duress, with Q&A by director Jordan Barker
- Merantau
- Metropia, with Q&A by director Tarik Saleh
- Sweet Karma, with Q&A by director Andrew Thomas Hunt and star Shera Bechard
- Van Diemen's Land with Q&A by star Mark Leonard Winter
- Tokyo Onlypics
- Under the Mountain

Texas premieres

- Breathless
- Bronson
- Buratino, Son of Pinocchio, with Q&A by director Rasmus Merivoo
- The Children
- Clive Barker's Dread
- Crazy Racer (food/film event)
- Cropsey
- Dirty Mind
- District 13: Ultimatum
- Fireball
- Fish Story
- Groper Train
- Hard Revenge Milly
- House (Hausu)
- The House of the Devil
- Journey to Saturn
- K-20: Legend of the Mask
- Kaifek Murder
- Kamogawa Horumo — Battle League in Kyoto
- Kenny Begins
- Krabat
- The Legend Is Alive
- Love Exposure
- Morphine
- Ninja Assassin
- Paranormal Activity
- Private Eye
- Rampage, with Q&A by director Uwe Boll
- The Revenant
- Salvage
- Soloman Kane
- Stingray Sam, with Q&A by director Cory McAbee
- Survival of the Dead
- Terribly Happy
- A Town Called Panic
- Trick R Treat
- Truffles (Truffe) (food/film event) with Q&A by director Kim Nguyen
- Vampire Girl vs Frankenstein Girl
- Yatterman
- Yesterday

=== Special screenings ===
- Cirque du Freak: The Vampire's Assistant, with Q&A by stars John C. Reilly, Chris Massoglia, and Josh Hutcherson
- The Men Who Stare at Goats
- The Imaginarium of Dr. Parnassus
- A Serious Man

=== Retrospective screenings ===
A retrospective of the films of Jess Franco in support of his lifetime achievement award:

- Succubus
- Venus in Furs
- Female Vampire (aka The Bare-Breasted Countess)
- Eugenie… The Story of Her Journey into Perversion

=== Award winners ===
Next Wave Award, for excellence by an up-and-coming filmmaker

- Best Feature: Down Terrace (Ben Wheatley)
- Best Director: Yang Ik-june (Breathless)
- Best Screenplay: Robin Hill, Ben Wheatley (Down Terrace)
- Best Actor: Hwang Jung-min (Private Eye)
- Best Actress: Shera Bechard (Sweet Karma)

Horror Jury Award, for excellence in the horror genre

- Best Horror Feature: Human Centipede (Tom Six)
- Best Horror Director: Kerry Prior (The Revenant)
- Best Horror Actor: Dieter Laser (Human Centipede)
- Best Horror Actress: Neve McIntosh (Salvage)

Fantastic Fest Jury Award, for excellence outside of the horror genre

- Best Fantastic Feature: Mandrill (Ernesto Diaz-Espinoza)
- Best Fantastic Director: Kim Nguyen (Truffe)
- Best Fantastic Screenplay: Tamio Hayashi adapted from Kotaro Isaka (Fish Story)
- Best Fantastic Actor: Marko Zaror (Mandrill)
- Best Fantastic Actress: Chiaki Kuriyama (Kamogawa Horumo)

Horror Shorts Award

- Best Horror Short – "Full Employment" (Thomas Oberlies, Matthias Vogel)
- Special Mention – "Excision" (Richard Bates Jr.)

Fantastic Shorts Award

- Best Fantastic Short – "Terminus" (Trevor Cawood)
- Special Jury Award – "Next Floor" (Denis Villeneuve)

Animated Shorts Award

- Best Animated Short – "I Am So Proud of You" (Don Hertzfeldt)
- Special Mention – "Alma" (Rodrigo Blaas)

Audience Award

- Audience Award, Best Feature: A Town Called Panic (Stephane Aubier, Vincent Patar)
- Audience Award, Honorable Mention: Fish Story
- Audience Award, Honorable Mention: Breathless
- Audience Award, Honorable Mention: The Revenant
- Audience Award, Honorable Mention: Merantau

=== Highlights ===
- Watching Uwe Boll fight Alamo Drafthouse owner Tim League at the Fantastic Debates
- Chaos Reigns!
- Brutus and Balzaak Bash party celebrating Gentlemen Broncos opening night party
- Shooting machine guns
- 100% medically accurate Q&A by director Tom Six after his film Human Centipede
- Opening of the Highball, the official Fantastic Fest party-place/bowling alley/bar
- Double 3D Dance Party at the Highball
- The Future of 3D: Panels and Presentations event
- The Michael Jackson Dance Party
- Sake, Shochu and Karaoke: Meet the Japanese! – party at Highball
- Return of the Fantastic Feud (and win by Team USA!)

== 2010 ==
The 2010 festival was held September 23–30. It was the first year of the Fantastic Arcade, a showcase of independent video games. The presenting sponsors of the 2010 Fantastic Fest were Dell, AMD, RealD, Ambhar Tequila, FearNet.com, Sony PlayStation, and Qriocity.

=== World premieres ===
Sources:

- Agnosia, with a Q&A by director Eugenio Mira
- 30 Days Of Night: Dark Days, with Q&A by director Ben Ketai, writers Kiele Sanchez and Steve Niles, and stars Diora Baird and Troy Ruptash
- Undocumented, with Q&A by director Chris Peckover
- Zombie Roadkill with Q&A by director David Green and stars David Dorfman and Thomas Haden Church
- Helldriver, with Q&A by director Yoshihiro Nishimura
- Sharktopus, with Q&A by Roger Corman and Julie Corman
- True Legend, with Q&A by director Yuen Woo-ping
- Troll Hunter with Q&A by director André Øvredal
- Red, with Q&A by star Karl Urban

International premieres

- Norwegian Ninja, with Q&A by director Thomas Cappelen Malling
- Ong Bak 3

US premieres

- Bedevilled with Q&A by director Jang Chul-soo
- Bunraku, with Q&A by director Guy Moshe and star Josh Hartnett
- Cold Fish
- The Corridor, with Q&A by directors Johan Lundborg and Johan Storm, and star Emil Johnsen
- The Dead, with Q&A by writer/directors Howard and Jonathan Ford
- Fatso
- Fire of Conscience
- Hatchet 2, with Q&A by director Adam Green
- A Horrible Way to Die, with Q&A by director Adam Wingard
- The Housemaid (2010 version)
- Julia's Eyes
- Kidnapped, with Q&A by director Miguel Angel Vivas
- The Last Circus, with Q&A by director Álex de la Iglesia
- Legend of the Fist: The Return of Chen Zhen
- Let Me In, with Q&A by director Matt Reeves, and stars Kodi Smit-McPhee, Elias Koteas, and Dylan Minnette
- Naan Kadavul
- Outrage
- Rammbock, with Q&A by director Marvin Kren
- Rare Exports: A Christmas Tale
- Red Hill
- Redline
- I Saw the Devil
- A Somewhat Gentle Man
- Sound of Noise
- I Spit on Your Grave
- Stake Land, with Q&A by director Jim Mickle, and stars Nick Damici, Connor Paolo, and Danielle Harris
- Stone, with Q&A by director John Curran and star Edward Norton
- Transfer
- We Are What We Are

Texas premieres

- 13 Assassins
- 14 Blades
- Bibliothèque Pascal
- Carancho
- Drones, with Q&A by directors Amber Benson and Adam Busch
- Gallants
- Golden Slumber
- Heartless
- High Lane
- In the Attic, with Q&A by director Jiří Barta
- Ip Man 2
- The Life and Death of a Porno Gang
- The Man From Nowhere
- Mother's Day, with Q&A by director Darren Bousman and star Rebecca De Mornay
- Mutant Girls Squad
- Never Let Me Go
- Primal
- Red White & Blue
- Rubber
- Summer Wars
- The Violent Kind, with Q&A by directors Mitchell Altieri and Phil Flores, and producer Don Lewis
- Woochi

=== Special screenings ===
- Buried, with Q&A by star Ryan Reynolds
- Machete Maidens Unleashed
- Nerdcore Rising (to kick off Fantastic Arcade)
- Playing Columbine, played as part of Fantastic Arcade
- Richard Garriott: Man on a Mission, with guest star Richard Garriott
- Enter the Void
- Nightmares – shown as part of Terror Tuesday
- For Your Height Only – presented in Foleyvision to commemorate Machete Maidens Unleashed!

=== Retrospective screenings ===
- Class of 1984 – to celebrate the debut of the new book by Zack Carlson, Destroy All Movies
- The Housemaid (1960 version)
- X: The Man with X-Ray Eyes – to commemorate the lifetime achievement award for Roger and Julie Corman
- Snake In Eagle's Shadow – to commemorate the lifetime achievement award for Yuen Wo Ping
- Five Element Ninjas – to commemorate the lifetime achievement award for Yuen Wo Ping
- Joysticks – shown for Weird Wednesday to commemorate Destroy All Movies
- The Twilight People – special Weird Wednesday to honor Machete Maidens Unleashed!
- Re-Animator – with special guest director Stuart Gordon and star Jeffery Combs
- From Beyond – with special guest director Stuart Gordon and star Jeffery Combs

Live Performances

- The Intergalactic Nemesis, a graphic novel radio play by Jason Neulander
- Nevermore, a stage performance by Jeffrey Combs as Edgar Allan Poe, directed by Stuart Gordon
- Independence Day, with live commentary by Master Pancake with Bill Pullman
- SpaceBalls Quote-Along, hosted by Bill Pullman

=== Award Winners ===
The Dell/AMD Next Wave Award, for excellence by an up-and-coming filmmaker

- Best Feature: We Are What We Are
- Best Director: Thomas Cappelen Malling (Norwegian Ninja)
- Best Screenplay: Jorge Michel Grau (We Are What We Are)
- Best Actor: Mads Ousdal (Norwegian Ninja)
- Best Actress: Seo Young-hee (Bedevilled)

Horror Jury Award, for excellence in the horror genre

- Best Horror Feature: Kidnapped
- Best Horror Director: Miguel Angel Vivas (Kidnapped)
- Best Horror Screenplay: Simon Barrett (A Horrible Way to Die)
- Best Horror Actor: A.J. Bowen (A Horrible Way to Die)
- Best Horror Actress: Amy Seimetz (A Horrible Way to Die)

Fantastic Fest Jury Award, for excellence outside of the horror genre

- Best Fantastic Feature: The Sound of Noise
- Best Fantastic Director: Pablo Trapero (Carancho)
- Best Fantastic Screenplay: Sion Sono and Yoshiki Takahashi (Cold Fish)
- Best Fantastic Actor: Stellan Skarsgard (A Somewhat Gentle Man)
- Best Fantastic Actress: Martina Gusman (Carancho)

Horror Shorts Award

- Best Horror Short – "Legend of Beaver Dam" (Jerome Sable)
- Special Mention – "Deus Irae" (Pedro Cristiani)

Fantastic Shorts Award

- Best Fantastic Short – "Sorry... I Love You" (Leticia Dolera)

Animated Shorts Award

- Best Animated Short – "Teclopolis" (Javier Mrad)

Audience Award

- Audience Award, Best Feature: Bedevilled (Jang Cheol-soo)
- Audience Award, Honorable Mention: Ip Man 2
- Audience Award, Honorable Mention: Rubber
- Audience Award, Honorable Mention: Golden Slumber

=== Highlights ===
- Boys' choir singing the theme from Let Me In at opening night
- Tim League boxing against Michelle Rodriguez (Girl Fight, Avatar)
- Bill Pullman, Elijah Wood, and RZA singing karaoke
- Whole-roasted cow and 500,000 volts of electricity at the closing night party
- 100 Best Kills party
- 30 Days of Night Flashlight Dance Party
- Criterion "Chaos Reigns" Karaoke Party
- Fantastic Arcade Awards Ceremony/Starcade Competition
- Datapop 4.0 Arcade Closing Night Party
- The FearNet Fantastic Feud (Team USA wins again!)
- Geeks Who Drink presents The Fantastic Fest Quiz
- Nerdeoke!
- Karaoke Apocalypse with live band
- Opening Night Party '80s Dance Party and MC Frontalot Live

== 2011 ==
The 2011 Fantastic Fest film festival was held September 22–29.

=== World premieres ===
Sources:

- Calibre 9 – Q&A with director Jean-Christian Tassy and producer Axel Guyot
- The Human Centipede 2: Full Sequence (opening night film) – director Tom Six, producer Ilona Six, and actors Ashlynn Yennie, Laurence Harvey, Maddi Black, Katherine Templar, and Emma Lock in attendance
- Manborg – writer/director/producer Steve Kostanski, co-writer/actor Jeremy Gillespie, and actor Andrea Carr in attendance
- Penumbra
- The Squad – Q&A with director Jaime Osorio Marquez
- Zombie Ass

International premieres

- The Devil's Business
- How to Steal 2 Million

U.S. premieres

- Blind
- A Boy and His Samurai
- Bullhead – Q&A with director Michaël R. Roskam
- Bunohan
- Carre Blanc – Director Jean-Baptiste Léonetti, producer Benjamin Mamou, and executive producer Camille Havard Bourdon in attendance
- Comic-Con Episode IV: A Fan's Hope (closing night film) – Producer Harry Knowles, and stars James Darling, Se Young, and Holly Conrad live in person
- The Corridor – Director Evan Kelly, writer Josh MacDonald, producer Mike Masters, and producer Craig Cameron live in person
- The Day – Producer Guy Danella, writer Lucas Passmore, and actor Dominic Monaghan live in person
- Extraterrestrial – Q&A with director Nacho Vigalondo
- Headhunters
- Juan of the Dead – Q&A with director Alejandro Brugués and producer Gervasio Iglesias Macias
- Julia X 3D – Q&A with director P.J. Pettiette, producer Claudie Viguerie, and actor Kevin Sorbo
- Karate-Robo Zaborgar – Q&A with director Noboru Iguchi and makeup/FX supervisor Yoshihiro Nishimura
- Kill Me Please – Q&A with director Olias Barco
- Last Screening – Q&A with actor Pascal Cervo
- Livid
- Michael
- New Kids Turbo – Q&A with actors Huub Smit and Wesley van Gaalen
- Rabies
- Retreat
- Revenge: A Love Story
- Sleep Tight – Q&A with director Jaume Balagueró
- Sleepless Night
- Smuggler
- Snowman's Land
- Snowtown
- Two Eyes Staring
- Urban Explorer
- You Said What? – Q&A with director Patrik Syversen, producer Kjetil Omberg, producer Terje Stromstad, and actor Stig Frode Henriksen
- You're Next – Q&A with writer/producer Simon Barrett, producers Keith Calder and Jess Wu, actors Barbara Crampton, A.J. Bowen, Sharni Vinson, and Nick Tucci

Texas premieres

- A Lonely Place to Die – Q&A with director/co-writer Julian Gilbey and co-writer/editor Will Gilbey
- Angels & Airwaves Presents LOVE – with guest Q&A from Tom Delonge
- Aardvark
- Beyond the Black Rainbow – Q&A with director Panos Cosmatos
- Body Temperature – Q&A with director Takaomi Ogata
- Borderline
- Boys On The Run
- El Infierno
- Elite Squad: The Enemy Within – Q&A with director José Padilha
- Haunters
- The Holding
- Invasion of Alien Bikini
- Klown (Clown) – Q&A with director Mikkel Norgaard
- Knuckle – Q&A with director Ian Palmer and James McDonagh
- Let the Bullets Fly
- Melancholia
- Milocrorze: A Love Story
- Polvora Negra – Q&A with director Kapel Furman
- The Stoker
- Summerland
- Take Shelter
- Underwater Love
- We Need to Talk About Kevin
- Sennentuntschi: Curse of the Alps
- Yakuza Weapon
- The Yellow Sea

=== Special screenings ===
- The Skin I Live In – (secret screening)
- Paranormal Activity 3 – (secret screening)
- The Innkeepers – premiered at SXSW but also was shown at the closing night of Fantastic Fest

=== Retrospective screenings ===
- An American Werewolf in London (1981) – presented by Mondo with special-edition poster and appearance by Stan Winston
- House by the Cemetery – theatrical premiere of the 2K digitally restored version
- Zombie – theatrical premiere of the 2K digitally restored version
- Comin' At Ya! 3D – with producer Tom Stern and star Tony Anthony in attendance
- Movies on Fire: Hong Kong Action Classics
- War of the Worlds – played as part of the Alamo Kid's Club
- Versus – Guest stars Tak Sakaguchi and writer Yudai Yamaguchi

=== Award winners ===
Audience Award

- A Boy and His Samurai (Yoshihiro Nakamura)
- Runners-Up: You're Next, Juan of the Dead

AMD & Dell "Next Wave" Spotlight Competition

- Best Picture — Bullhead
- Best Director — Michael R. Roskam (Bullhead)
- Best Screenplay — Josh MacDonald (The Corridor)
- Best Actor — Matthias Schoenaerts (Bullhead)
- Best Actress — Jessica Cole (Aardvark)
- Special Jury Award for Boldness of Vision: Beyond the Black Rainbow

Horror Features

- Best Picture — You're Next
- Best Director — Adam Wingard (You're Next)
- Best Screenplay — Simon Barrett (You're Next)
- Best Actor — Sean Harris (A Lonely Place to Die)
- Best Actress — Sharni Vinson (You're Next)

Fantastic Features

- Best Picture — Milocrorze: A Love Story
- Best Director — Noboru Iguchi (Karate Robo Zaborgar)
- Best Screenplay — Olafur Egilsson, Grimur Haonarson (Summerland)
- Best Actor — Julián Villagrán (Extraterrestrial)
- Best Actress — Sawa Masaki (Underwater Love)

Gutbuster Comedy Features

- Best Picture – Clown
- Best Director — Steffen Haars, Flip Van Der Kuil (New Kids Turbo)
- Best Screenplay — Casper Christensen, Frank Hvam (Clown)

Short Fuse: Horror Shorts

- Winner: "How to Rid Your Lover of a Negative Emotion Caused By You" (Nadia Litz)
- Runner-up: "The Unliving" (Hugo Lilj)
- Special Jury Award for Outstanding Achievement in Special Effects and General Badassery: "Brutal Relax" (David Muñoz, Rafa Dengrá, Adrián Cardona)

Fantastic Shorts

- Best Fantastic Short: "Decapoda Shock" (Javier Chillón)
- Runner-up: "All Men Are Called Robert" (Marc-Henri Boulier)
- Special Jury Mention for Acting: Robert Picardo ("The Candidate")

Drawn and Quartered: Animated Shorts

- Best Animated Short: "The Last Norwegian Troll" (Pjotr Sapegin)
- Runner-up: Lazarov ("NIETOV")

=== Highlights ===
- James Quinn McDonagh versus Tim League at the Fantastic Fest Debates
- The opening night film Human Centipede 2 had an ambulance on standby outside and handed out barf bags
- Opening night party in celebration of Human Centipede 2 with live music from the Charles Edward Cheese band
- Fantastic Feud (Team USA continues win streak over Team International)
- Fantastic Arcade ran Sept. 22–24
- Japan Night: Chaos Reigns Karaoke Party
- 100 Best Kills featuring the best of audience submitted movie deaths
- Karaoke Apocalypse – karaoke with a live band
- Fantastic Trivia presented by Geeks Who Drink
- Fantastic Fest Closing Night Party: Superhero Carnival – featuring Aquaman's Ocean, The Flash's Mountain Race Challenge, Batman's Boxing Battle, Spider-man's Wall of Webbing, Superman's House of Flight and carnival food

== 2012 ==
The 2012 Fantastic Fest Film Festival took place September 20–27. This was the last year Fantastic Fest was held at the Highball and South Lamar theater before it was all remodeled.

=== World premieres ===
Sources:

- The ABCs of Death
- The American Scream – Q&A with director Michael Paul Stephenson, producer Lindsay Stephenson, and haunters Manny Souza and Victor Bariteau and family
- Besties
- Black Out
- Bring Me the Head of the Machine Gun Woman – Q&A with director Ernesto Diaz
- The Collection – Q&A with actress Emma Fitzpatrick
- The Conspiracy – Q&A with Director Christopher MacBride, producer Lee Kim, actor/producer Aaron Poole, cinematographer Ian Anderson, and actor Jim Gilbert
- Danger 5
- The Exorcist in the 21st Century
- Frankenweenie – (opening night film) – Q&A with Tim Burton and voice actors Winona Ryder and Martin Landau
- The Greatest Movie Ever Rolled – Q&A with director Ryan Polito, star Doug Benson, producer Sharon Everitt, and cinematographer Will Deloney
- Hellfjord
- Plan C
- Red Dawn – (closing night film) – Q&A with stars Josh Peck and Adrianne Palicki, director Dan Bradley, and producers Tripp Vinson and Beau Flynn
- Tebana Sankichi: Snot Rockets
- Universal Soldier: Day of Reckoning – Q&A with actor Scott Adkins and Mariah Bonner

International premieres

- Two Rabbits (Dois Coehilos)

U.S. premieres

- Aftershock - Q&A with director Nicolás López and actor/producer Eli Roth
- American Mary – Q&A with the Soska Sisters and actress Tristan Risk
- Antiviral
- Berberian Sound Studio
- Cockneys vs. Zombies – Q&A with director Matthias Hoene and writer James Moran
- Combat Girls
- Come Out and Play
- Crave – Q&A with director Charles de Lauzirika and actor Josh Lawson
- Dead Sushi – Q&A with director Noboru Iguchi, producer Mana Fukui, and actress Rina Takeda
- Dom: A Russian Family
- Errors of the Human Body – Q&A with actor Michael Eklund, director Jennifer Phang, actor/co-producer Jacqueline Kim, and technical director Jon Destoppeleire
- Everybody in Our Family
- Fuck Up – Q&A with director Oystein Karlsen, producer Anders Tangen, cinematographer Pal Bugge Haagenrud, and actor Jon Oigarden
- Henge
- Here Comes the Devil – Q&A with director Adrián García Bogliano, producer Andrea Quiroz Hernandez, and actor Francisco Barreiro
- Holy Motors
- I Declare War – Q&A with director Rob Wilson and producer Lewin Webb
- The King of Pigs
- La Memoria del Muerto (Memory of the Dead) – Q&A with director Javier Diment and writer Martin Blousson
- Lee's Adventure
- Looper – Q&A with director Rian Johnson
- My Amityville Horror – Q&A with director Eric Walter and producers Andrea Adams and Christine Irons
- New Kids Nitro – Q&A with directors Steffen Haars and Flip van der Kuil, as well as actors Huub Smit and Wesley van Gaalen
- Outrage Beyond
- Pusher
- Tai Chi 0
- Tower Block – Q&A with director Ronnie Thompson
- Vanishing Waves
- Vegetarian Cannibal
- The Warped Forest
- Young Gun in the Time

Texas premieres

- Cold Blooded
- Cold Steel – Q&A with director David Wu
- Dredd – Q&A with writer/director Alex Garland, actress Olivia Thirlby, and actor Karl Urban
- The Final Member – Q&A with directors Jonah Bekhor and Zach Math
- Flicker
- Graceland – Q&A with director Ron Morales and producer Rebecca Lundgren
- Hail
- The History of Future Folk – Q&A with producer/co-director Jeremy Kipp Walker, writer/co-director John Mitchell, and actors Nil d-Aulaire and Jay Klaitz
- No Rest for the Wicked
- Paris By Night
- Room 237
- Taped
- Unit 7
- Vulgaria
- Wrong

Austin premieres

- Doomsday Book

=== Special screenings ===
- Cloud Atlas – (secret screening)
- Sightseers – (secret screening)
- Sinister – premiered at SXSW; then had a special screening at Fantastic Fest
- Paranormal Activity 4 – work-in-progress print with a Q&A with actress Katie Featherston and co-director Henry Joost

=== Retrospective screenings ===
- The Entity (1982) – repertory screening as part of the House of Psychotic Women series
- The Mafu Cage (1978) – repertory screening as part of the House of Psychotic Women series
- Miami Connection (1987) – Q&A with actor/producer Grandmaster YK, and actors Joe Diamond, Maurice Smith, Angelo Jannotti, and Vince Hirsch
- Secret Ceremony (1968) repertory screening as part of the House of Psychotic Women series
- The Shining (1980) – played simultaneously back and forth over each other
- Wake in Fright (1971)

=== Award winners ===
Audience Award

- I Declare War (dir. Robert Wilson and Jason Lapeyre)

AMD "Next Wave" Spotlight Competition

- Best Picture: Flicker (dir. Patrik Eklund)
- Best Director: Charles de Lauzirika (Crave)
- Best Screenplay: Max Porcelijn (Plan C)
- Best Actor: Michael Eklund (Errors of the Human Body)
- Best Actress: Alina Levshin (Combat Girls)

Fantastic Features

- Best Picture: Vanishing Waves (dir. Kristina Buozyte)
- Best Director: Kristina Buozyte (Vanishing Waves)
- Best Screenplay: Bruno Samper, Kristina Buozyte (Vanishing Waves)
- Best Actor: Rene Bitorajac (Vegetarian Cannibal)
- Best Actress: Jurga Jutaite (Vanishing Waves)

Horror Features

- Best Picture: Here Comes the Devil (dir. Adrián García Bogliano)
- Best Screenplay: Adrián García Bogliano (Here Comes the Devil)
- Best Director: Adrián García Bogliano (Here Comes the Devil)
- Special Mention: Hajime Ohata (Henge)
- Best Actor: Francisco Barreiro (Here Comes the Devil)
- Best Actress: Laura Caro (Here Comes the Devil)
- Special Mention: Katherine Isabel (American Mary)

Gutbuster Comedy Features

- Best Picture: New Kids Nitro (dir. Steffen Haars & Flip Van der Kuil)
- Best Director: Dario Russo (Danger 5)
- Best Screenplay: John Mitchell (The History of Future Folk)
- Best Actor: Chapman To (Vulgaria)
- Best Actress: Rina Takeda (Dead Sushi)

Documentary Features

- Best Picture: The American Scream (dir. Michael Stephenson)
- Best Director: Rodney Ascher (Room 237)

Short Fuse: Horror Shorts

- Winner: "At the Formal" (Andrew Kavanagh, Australia)
- Runner-up: "The Sleepover" (Chris Cullari, US)

Fantastic Shorts

- Winner: "Record/Play" (Jesse Atlas, US)
- Runner-up: "Love" (Kaveh Nabatian, Canada)

Drawn and Quartered: Animated Shorts

- Winner: "Bendito Machine IV" (Jossie Malis, Spain)
- Runner-up: "Tram" (Michaela Pavlátová, Czech Republic)

=== Highlights ===
- Front of Drafthouse Lamar painted up for Frankenweenie world premiere
- Special Frankenweenie screening for dogs and their owners
- Chaos Reigns Karaoke Party with reunited Dragon Sound at the Highball
- Opening night Monsters Ball where attendees were encouraged to wear their favorite silver-screen monster costume
- The American Scream Homemade Haunted House
- Datapop party celebrating 8-bit music and culture for Fantastic Arcade
- "Hellfjord" Norwegian Party
- Tim League fighting YK Kim at the Fantastic Debates
- Closing night party was Red Dawn themed. The Austin American Legion was decorated as a maximum-security prison with free prison tattoos and head shaving
- Fantastic Feud (Team International's first victory over Team USA)

== 2013 ==
The 2013 festival was hosted for the first time at the brand new Alamo Drafthouse Lakeline location from September 19–26.

=== World premieres ===
Sources:

- Coherence
- Detective Downs
- Goldberg and Eisenberg
- Grand Piano
- Greatful Dead
- LFO
- Machete Kills (opening night)
- Ninja: Shadow of a Tear
- Ragnarok
- Septic Man

North American premieres

- Chanthaly
- The Congress
- A Field in England
- Journey to the West: Conquering the Demons
- Kid's Police
- Maruyama the Middle Schooler
- Mirage Men
- Miss Zombie
- Monsoon Shootout
- Nothing Bad Can Happen
- Our Heroes Died Tonight
- Patrick
- She Wolf
- The Zero Theorem

U.S. premieres

- Afflicted
- Almost Human
- Blue Ruin
- Borgman
- Commando: A One Man Army
- Confession of Murder
- The Fake
- Gatchaman
- Love Eternal
- Man of Tai Chi
- Moebius
- Mood Indigo
- On The Job
- Proxy
- R100
- Rigor Mortis
- The Sacrament
- "Sleep Clinic"
- The Strange Colour of Your Body's Tears
- Vic + Flo Saw a Bear
- We Gotta Get Out of This Place
- Why Don't You Play in Hell?
- Witching & Bitching
- Wolf

Texas premieres

- Big Bad Wolves
- The Dirties
- Escape from Tomorrow
- Fatal
- Halley
- Hentai Kamen: Forbidden Super Hero
- Jodorowsky's Dune
- Metallica Through the Never
- Narco Cultura
- Nightbreed: The Cabal Cut
- Northwest
- The Resurrection of a Bastard
- O'Apostolo
- We Are What We Are

Austin premieres

- Eega
- Tales from the Organ Trade

=== Special screenings ===
- Cheap Thrills – special encore presentation
- The Green Inferno – (secret screening)
- Gravity – (secret screening)
- Child of God – (secret screening)
- The Rundown – a movie interruption from Doug Benson

=== Retrospective screenings ===
- All the Boys Love Mandy Lane
- Timecrimes – special screening with Mondo poster and vinyl of soundtrack with director Nacho Vigalondo
- The Devils

=== Award Winners ===
Audience Award

- Best Documentary: Jodorowsky's Dune (director Frank Pavich)
- Best Narrative Feature: Blue Ruin (director Jeremy Saulnier)

"Next Wave" Spotlight

- Best Picture: The Dirties (director Matt Johnson)
- Best Director: Oren Carmi (Goldberg and Eisenberg)
- Best Screenplay: James Ward Byrkit (Coherence)
- Best Actor: Yorick van Wageningen (The Resurrection of a Bastard)
- Best Actress: Swantje Kohlhof (Nothing Bad Can Happen)

Fantastic Features

- Best Picture: The Congress (director Ari Folman)
- Best Director: David Perrault (Our Heroes Died Tonight)
- Best Screenplay: Ari Folman (The Congress)
- Best Actor: Svein André Hofsø Myhre (Detective Downs)
- Best Actress: Robin Wright (The Congress)

Horror Features

- Best Picture: Afflicted (directors Derek Lee and Clif Prowse)
- Best Director: Derek Lee and Clif Prowse (Afflicted)
- Best Screenplay: Derek Lee and Clif Prowse (Afflicted)
- Best Actor: Jason David Brown (Septic Man)
- Best Actress: Julia Garner (We Are What We Are)

Gutbuster Comedy Features

- Best Picture: Why Don't You Play In Hell (director Sion Sono)
- Best Director: Sion Sono (Why Don't You Play In Hell)
- Best Screenplay: Kankurô Kudô (Maruyama The Middle Schooler)
- Best Actor: Fuku Suzuki (Kid's Police)
- Best Actress: Qi Shu (Journey To the West: Conquering The Demon)

Documentary Features

- Best Picture: Jodorowsky's Dune (director Frank Pavich)
- Best Director: Shaul Schwarz (Narco Cultura)

Short Fuse: Horror Shorts

- Winner: Remember Me (director Jean-François Asselin)
- Runner-up: Perfect Drug (director Toon Aerts)

Fantastic Shorts

- Winner: Beasts in the Real World (director Sol Friedman)
- Runner-up: My Pain Is Worse Than Your Pain (director Adam Hall)

Drawn and Quartered: Animated Shorts

- Winner: The Sad House (director Sofia Catalina Carrillo Ramírez)
- Runner-up: Kick-Heart (director Masaaki Yuasa)

Fantastic Arcade

- Best in Show and Audience Choice: Samurai Gunn (developed by Teknopants)

=== Highlights ===
- Danger Gods!: The True Daredevils of Hollywood Legend – live stunt show
- Fantastic Arcade panels and tournaments
- Opening Night Party: Machete Don't Stop
- Fantastic Fest presents Doug Loves Movies
- Chaos Reigns!!! Karaoke Party
- The Fantastic Debates Presented by Man of Tai Chi
- Cards Against Humanity Happy Hour
- Fantastic Arcade VideoHeroeS Tournament and Arcade Awards
- You Guys Like Tequila?: The Fantastic Arcade After Party
- Nerd Rap Throwdown
- Fantastic Feud (win by Team USA)
- Fantastic Trivia presented by Geeks Who Drink
- Metal Meltdown with Karaoke Apocalypse – live band karaoke
- Closing Night Party

== 2014 ==
The 2014 festival returned to the Alamo Drafthouse South Lamar location from September 18–25 for the 10-year anniversary.

=== World premieres ===
Sources:

- The ABCs of Death 2
- Danger 5 (Season 2)
- Relocos y Repasados
- Horsehead
- Dios Local
- Wyrmwood
- The Absent One
- Dwarves Kingdom
- Felt
- I Am Here
- I Am Trash
- Purgatory
- Redeemer
- Everly
- From the Dark
- Future Shock! The Story of 2000AD
- The Hive
- My Life Directed by Nicolas Winding Refn
- Confetti of the Mind: The Short Films of Nacho Vigolando

North American premieres

- Whispers Behind the Wall
- El Incidente
- Naturaleza Muerte (Still Life)
- Tombville
- Tommy
- As Seen by the Rest
- Free Fall
- Necrophobia 3D
- Realiti
- Wastelander Panda:Exile
- Darkness by Day
- Lost Soul: The Doomed Journey of Richard Stanley's Island of Dr. Moreau
- Nymphomaniac (Director's Cut)

U.S. premieres

- Alleluia
- Bro's Before Ho's
- The Man in the Orange Jacket
- Norway
- Tusk
- V/H/S:Viral
- The Creeping Garden
- The Editor
- Electric Boogaloo: The Wild, Untold Story of Cannon Films
- Force Majeure
- Nightcrawler
- Over Your Dead Body
- Spring
- The Tale of Princess Kaguya
- Tokyo Tribe
- The Treatment
- Automata
- Cub
- The Duke of Burgundy
- Haemoo
- Hardkor Disco
- I Am a Knife With Legs
- It Follows
- Let Us Prey
- Shrew's Nest
- The Tribe
- Waste Land
- When Animals Dream
- The World of Kanako

Texas premieres

- The Babadook
- Closer to God
- Jacky in the Kingdom of Women
- Blind
- Dead Snow: Red vs. Dead
- In Order of Disappearance
- No Man's Land

Austin premieres

- Man from Reno
- Horns

=== Special screenings ===
- Kung Fu Elliot – Fantastic Fest premiere
- John Wick – special gala screening
- Goodnight Mommy – secret screening
- Miami Connection – a movie interruption from Doug Benson
- The Look of Silence – a Drafthouse Alliance special screening
- The Island of Dr. Moreau – Master Pancake screening

=== Retrospective screenings ===
- Bugsy Malone – Kid Power! book launch
- Death Wish III
- The Astrologer
- Ninja III: The Domination
- The Soultangler

=== Award winners ===
Audience Award

- The Tale of Princess Kaguya (director Isao Takahata)

"Next Wave" Spotlight

- Best Picture: It Follows (director David Robert Mitchell)
- Best Director: Miroslav Slaboshpitsky (The Tribe)
- Best Screenplay: David Robert Mitchell (It Follows)
- Best Actor: Lou Taylor Pucci (Spring)
- Best Actress: Amy Everson (Felt)

Fantastic Features

- Best Picture: Alleluia (director Fabrice Du Welz)
- Best Director: Fabrice Du Welz (ALLELUIA)
- Best Screenplay: Tetsuya Nakashima, Miako Tadano and Nobuhiro Monma (THE WORLD OF KANAKO)
- Best Actor: Laurent Lucas (ALLELUIA)
- Best Actress: Lola Dueñas (ALLELUIA)

Horror Features

- Best Picture: THE BABADOOK (directed Jennifer Kent)
- Best Screenplay: Jennifer Kent (THE BABADOOK)
- Best Director: Martín De Salvo (DARKNESS BY DAY)
- Best Actor: Noah Wiseman (THE BABADOOK)
- Best Actress: Essie Davis (THE BABADOOK)

Gutbuster Comedy Features

- Best Picture: DEAD SNOW 2: RED VS DEAD (director by Tommy Wirkola)
- Best Director: Hans Petter Moland (IN ORDER OF DISAPPEARANCE)
- Best Screenplay: Vegar Hoel, Stig Frode Henriksen and Tommy Wirkola (DEAD SNOW 2: RED VS DEAD)
- Best Actor: Pål Sverre Hagen (IN ORDER OF DISAPPEARANCE)
- Best Actress: Sylvia Hoeks (BROS BEFORE HOS)

Documentary Features

- Best Picture: KUNG FU ELLIOT (director Jaret Belliveau)
- Best Director: Tim Grabham, Jasper Sharp (THE CREEPING GARDEN)

Short Fuse: Horror Shorts'

- Winner: THE STOMACH directed by Ben Steiner
- Runner-up: INVADERS directed by Jason Kupfer

Fantastic Shorts

- Winner: THE VOICE THIEF directed by Adan Jodorowsky
- Runner-up: MY FATHER IS A BIRD (director Boaz Debby) and SOLITUDO (director Alice Lowe)

Drawn and Quartered: Animated Shorts

- Winner: THE CHAPERONE (director Fraser Munden)
- Runner-up: DAY 40 (director Sol Friedman)

Fantastic Arcade

- Best in Show: BANANA CHALICE (developed by Kyle Reimergartin)

‘Mercado Fantastico’

- Gold Prize: HAVANA VAMPIRE TERRITORY (director Carlos Lechuga) and THE TURNED (director Andrés Rosende)
- Silver Prize: FIERCE (director Francisco Lorite)
- Bronze Prize: HURT (director Pablo Proenza)
- Special Jury Mention for "Keeping the Spirit of the 80's Alive": THE SHADOWDWELLERS (producer Erick Salomon)
- Jury Award for Work in Progress, and Chemistry Award: FRONDOSO EDEN DEL CORAZON (director Juan Manuel Fodde)
- Morbido/Latam Consultation Award: EAT ME (director David Michán)

=== Highlights ===
Sources:

- Maltin's Game Tournament hosted by Leonard Maltin
- The Meltdown with Jonah and Kumail
- Fantastic Debates
- Nerd Rap Throwdown
- Opening Night: 10th Birthday Armageddon (featuring food fight and human piñata)
- Fantastic Feud (winner: Team USA)
- Fantastic Arcade
- Chaos Reigns! Karaoke Party
- Metal Meltdown with Karaoke Apocalypse
- Fantastic Fest ABCs of Closing Night Party

== 2015 ==
The 2015 festival returned to the Alamo Drafthouse South Lamar location from Sept. 24–Oct. 1.

=== World premieres ===
- Bone Tomahawk
- Darling
- Dirty Romance
- Gridlocked
- La Granja
- Lazer Team
- Man Vs Snake
- The Passing
- Sensoria
- The Similars
- What We Become
- Zinzana

North American premieres

- The Brand New Testament
- Coz Ov Moni 2
- Der Bunker
- In Search of Ultra Sex
- Lovemilla
- Speed

U.S. premieres

- April and the Extraordinary World
- Assassination Classroom
- Baskin
- The Club
- Demon
- German Angst
- Green Room
- High-Rise
- The Lobster
- Love and Peace
- Ludo
- The Missing Girl
- Office
- Remake, Remix, Rip-off
- Stand By for Tape Back Up

Texas premieres

- The Keeping Room
- L'affaire SK1
- The Witch
- Yakuza Apocalypse

=== Special screenings ===
- The Martian
- The Invitation

=== Award winners ===
Audience Award

- 1st Place – Green Room (director Jeremy Saulnier)
- 2nd Place – Liza the Fox Fairy (director Károly Ujj Mészáros)
- 3rd Place – Stand By for Tape Back-Up (director Ross Sutherland)

"Next Wave" Spotlight

- Best Picture: Der Bunker (director Nikias Chryssos)
- Best Director: Can Evrenol for Baskin

Fantastic Features

- Best Picture: The Club
- Best Director: Duke Johnson and Charlie Kaufman for Anomalisa

Horror Features

- Best Picture: Demon
- Best Director: Joe Begos for THE MIND’S EYE

Comedy Features

- Best Picture: THE BRAND NEW TESTAMENT
- Best Director: Anders Thomas Jensen for MEN & CHICKEN

Documentary Features

- Best Picture: MAN VS SNAKE
- Best Director: Heath Cozens for DOGLEGS

Horror Shorts

- Best Picture: SISTER HELL
- Best Director: Ryan Spindell for THE BABYSITTER MURDERS

Fantastic Shorts

- Best Picture: MOVIES IN SPACE
- Best Director: Jeremy David White for ENHANCED

Fantastic Arcade

- Best in Show: SECRET LEGEND developed by Andrew Shouldice
- Audience Award Winner: SUPER RUSSIAN ROULETTE developed by Andrew Reitano

Mercado Fantastico

- 1st Place: THE DUMP by Fernando Montes de Oca and Xavier Sánchez Mercado
- 2nd Place: PARADISE HILLS by Alice Waddington
- 3rd Place: EL GIGANTE by Gigi Saul Guerrero

FANTASTIC BUMPER COMPETITION – Presented by SourceFed Nerd

- THE JURY directed by Joe Nicolosi

== 2016 ==
The 2016 festival took place at the Alamo Drafthouse South Lamar from Sept. 22–29.

=== World premieres ===
Sources:

- Split – with M. Night Shyamalan in attendance
- 24x26: A Movie About Movie Posters
- A Dark Song
- Dearest Sister
- The Dwarves Must Be Crazy
- Jungle Trap
- Phantasm: Ravager
- The Void
- Better Watch Out
- Sweet, Sweet Lonely Girl
- The Zodiac Killer
- Another Wolfcop
- Bad Black
- Boyka: Undisputed
- Fashionista
- The Osiris Child: Science Fiction Volume One

International Premieres

- Popoz
- Aalavandhan
- The High Frontier
- Shimauma
- Terry Teo
- Young Offenders
- The Truth Beneath

North American Premieres

- Chunyuki
- Call of Heroes
- Don't Kill It – with Dolph Lundgren in attendance
- Kammattipadam
- The Red Turtle
- Re:Born
- S Is for Stanley
- Salt and Fire

U.S. Premieres

- Arrival
- Asura
- Assassination Classroom – Graduation
- The Bad Batch
- Zoology
- Dog Eat Dog
- Elle
- The Girl With All the Gifts
- The Handmaiden
- Nova Seed
- Raw
- Sadako vs. Kayako
- Toni Erdmann
- The Age of Shadows
- The Autopsy of Jane Doe
- Colossal
- Headshot
- The Invisible Guest
- My Entire Highschool is Sinking Into the Sea

Texas Premieres

- Helmut Berger, Actor
- They Call Me Jeeg Robot
- A Monster Calls
- Hentai Kamen 2: The Abnormal Crisis
- The Lure

Regional Premieres

- Bugs
- The Eyes of My Mother

Austin Premieres

- Rats

Repertory Screenings

- Khalnayak
- Magadheera

Special Screenings

- The Greasy Strangler
- Miss Peregrine's Home for Peculiar Children
- Phantasm: Remastered
- Goke: Body Snatcher from Hell
- Ash vs. Evil Dead – with Bruce Campbell, Ray Santiago, Dana DeLorenzo and Lee Majors in attendance
- Westworld

=== Award Winners ===
Audience Award

- Bad Black – Directed by Nabwana Igg
- 1st Runner Up – Nirvanna The Band The Show – Directed by Matt Johnson
- 2nd Runner Up – Raw – Directed by Julia Ducournau

"Next Wave" Features

- Best Picture: ZOOLOGY directed by Ivan I. Tverdovsky
- Best Director: Julia Ducournau for RAW
- Special Mention for Fantastic Spirit: THE LURE

Fantastic Features

- Best Picture: COLOSSAL directed by Nacho Vigalondo
- Best Director: Amat Escalante for THE UNTAMED

Horror Features

- Best Picture: THE AUTOPSY OF JANE DOE directed by André Øvredal
- Best Director: Colm McCarthy for THE GIRL WITH ALL THE GIFTS

Comedy Features

- Best Picture: DOWN UNDER directed by Abraham Forsythe
- Best Director: Abraham Forsythe for DOWN UNDER
- Special Mention for Best Comedy Debut: THE YOUNG OFFENDERS

Action Features

- Best Picture: AGE OF SHADOWS directed by Kim Jee-woon
- Best Director: Nabwana IGG for BAD BLACK
- Special Mention for Best Action: CALL OF HEROES

Documentary Features

- Best Picture: Original Copy directed by Florian Heinzen-Ziob & Georg Heinzen
- Best Director: Florian Heinzen-Ziob and Georg Heinzen for Original Copy

Short Fuse: Horror Shorts

- Best Picture: CURVE directed by Tim Egan
- Best Director : Tim Egan for CURVE
- Special Mention: OVERTIME
- Special Mention: Najarra Townsend, lead actress in THE STYLIST

Fantastic Shorts

- Best Picture: SUMMER CAMP ISLAND directed by Julia Pott
- Best Director : Chris Mitchell & Yoav Lester for IRON SPYDER

Shorts With Legs

- Best Picture: PACO directed by Catalina Jordan Alvarez
- Best Director: Calvin Reeder for THE PROCEDURE
- Special Mention for Best Meal: THE WORM

Fantastic Arcade

- Most Fantastic: Everything by David O'Reilly
- Audience Choice: Loot Rascals by Hollow Ponds

Fantastic Bumper Competition

- JACK SKELLINGTON IN THE BOX directed by Roman Fruehan

=== Highlights ===
- Satanic Panic Escape Room
- Fantastic Feud
- Fantastic Debates
- Doug Loves Movies
- The Meltdown with Jonah and Kumail
- Itchy-O
- Maltin at the Movies: Tim Burton
- Puke and Explode! – The Fantastic Fest Eating Contest
- Dishoom Reigns Karaoke Party
- Maltin at the Movies: Bruce Campbell
- Nerd Rap
- Rogue One for the Road: The Star Wars Drink Competition
- Everything Is Terrible!
- 100 Best Kills: 100 Worst Births
- Geeks Who Drink
- Doug Benson Movie Interruption: The Monster Squad
- Dark Corner VR
  - Catatonic
  - Mule
  - Burlap

== 2017 ==
The 2017 festival took place at the Alamo Drafthouse South Lamar from Sept. 21–28. The event attracted attention due to the disclosure that Tim League had re-hired Devin Faraci as a writer even though Faraci resigned from Birth.Movies.Death in 2016 after he was accused of sexual assault. Faraci's re-hiring prompted the resignation of Todd Brown, Fantastic Fest's director of international programming. Alamo Drafthouse/Fantastic Fest severed ties with Harry Knowles after sexual harassment/assault allegations pertaining to him also surfaced.

=== World Premieres ===
Sources:

- 1922
- Anna and the Apocalypse
- Juvenile
- Maus
- Applecart
- Haunters: The Art of the Scare
- Salyut-7
- Tigers Are Not Afraid
- Wheelman
- World of Tomorrow Episode Two: The Burden of Other People's Thoughts
- Ichi the Killer (4k Restoration)
- Take It Out in Trade – (secret screening presented by Something Weird)
- All You Can Eat Buddha
- Wizard (Matwetwe)
- Hagazussa

International Premieres

- The Originals
- 3Ft. Ball and Souls
- Baasha
- Rabbit
- V.I.P.

North American Premieres

- Ron Goossens: Low-Budget Stuntman
- Top Knot Detective
- Before We Vanish
- Blue My Mind
- Firstborn
- Good Manners
- Jupiter's Moon
- The Line
- Mary and the Witch's Flower
- The Merciless
- Generatie B
- Pin Cushion
- See You Up There

U.S. Premieres

- Blade of the Immortal
- Brawl in Cell Block 99
- Cold Hell
- Black Spot (Zone Blanche)
- Bodied
- Dan Dream
- The Death of Stalin
- Gerald's Game
- Jailbreak
- The Killing of a Sacred Deer
- King Cohen
- The Square
- Tiger Girl
- The Cured
- Darkland
- Five Fingers for Marseilles
- Junk Head
- Les Affames
- Let the Corpses Tan
- Letterkenny
- Mom and Dad
- The Prince of Nothingwood
- Professor Marston & the Wonder Women
- Radius
- Revenge
- Under the Tree
- Vampire Clay
- Downsizing
- 1%
- Tabula Rasa

Texas Premieres

- Mon Mon Mon Monsters
- Rift
- Thelma
- Vidar the Vampire
- The Endless
- My Friend Dahmer
- Bad Genius
- Bat Pussy
- Love and Saucers

Repertory Screenings

- The Nude Vampire
- Anyab
- Maniac Cop 2

Special Screenings

- Gemini
- Doug Benson Movie Interruption: Babe: Pig in the City

=== Award Winners ===
Audience Award Winner

- Audience Award Winner: BODIED directed by Joseph Kahn
- 1st Runner-Up: GILBERT directed by Neil Berkeley
- 2nd Runner-Up: WORLD OF TOMORROW EPISODE TWO directed by Don Hertzfeldt

"Next Wave" Features

- Best Picture: Hagazussa: A Heathen's Curse directed by Lukas Feigelfeld
- Best Director: Takahide Hori for JUNK HEAD
- Special Mention for both Five Fingers for Marseilles and Maus

Fantastic Features

- Best Picture: My Friend Dahmer directed by Marc Meyers
- Best Director: Kornél Mundruczó for Jupiter's Moon
- Special Mention for both Tiger Girl and Good Manners

Horror Features

- Best Picture: THE CURED directed by David Freyne
- Best Director: Issa López for TIGERS ARE NOT AFRAID
- Special Mention for Most Creative FX and Innovative Approach to Vampire Mythology to VAMPIRE CLAY

Comedy Features

- Best Picture: THE SQUARE directed by Ruben Östlund
- Best Director: Hafsteinn Gunnar Sigurðsson for UNDER THE TREE
- Special Mention for Sheer Ballsiness to RON GOOSMAN’S LOW BUDGET STUNT MAN

Thriller Features

- Best Picture: BAD GENIUS directed by Nattawut Poonpiriya
- Best Director: Park Hoon-jung for V.I.P.
- Special Mention for Building a Cinematic Universe on a Budget: The Endless

Documentary Features

- Best Picture and Best Director: BRIMSTONE & GLORY directed by Viktor Jakovleski
- Special Mention to Love and Saucers

Short Fuse: Horror Shorts

- Best Picture: VOYEUR directed by Charlotte Lam, Claire Stradwick
- Best Director : Gonçalo Almeida for THURSDAY NIGHT
- Special Mention to CRESWICK

Fantastic Shorts

- Best Picture: THE BURDEN directed by Niki Lindroth von Bahr
- Special Mention for Biggest Face Melter to KAIJU BUNRAKU

Shorts With Legs

- Best Picture and Best Director: THE TESLA WORLD LIGHT directed by Matthew Rankin
- Special Mention to BEANS by director Maxwell Nalevansky

Fantastic Bumper Competition

- SNAP SNAP directed by Felicia Rein

=== Highlights ===
- Fantastic Debates
- Fantastic Feud
- Maltin at the Movies: Elijah Wood
- Maltin at the Movies: Vince Vaughn
- Puke and Explode! – The Fantastic Fest Eating Contest
- Nerd Rap Contest
- Chaos Reigns Karaoke Party
- Opening Night Pajama Party Jam
- Transference VR
- The Monster Squad Mega Mash
- The Thing: Infection at Outpost 31 Game Play
- Teen Panel: Anna and the Apocalypse
- The Glassed Jedi: Star Wars Drink Competition
- Everything is Terrible: The Great Satan
- Cadaverous Closing Night Party with Itchy-O

== 2018 ==
The 2018 festival took place at the Alamo Drafthouse South Lamar from Sept. 20–27.

=== World Premieres ===
Sources:

- Bros: After the Screaming Stops
- All the Gods in the Sky
- Apostle
- Between Worlds
- Bloodline
- The Boat
- Feral
- Folklore
  - "Mongdal"
  - "Toyol"
- FP2: Beats of Rage
- Girls with Balls
- House of Sweat and Tears
- I Was a Teenage Serial Killer – new restoration
- Level 16
- Maniac – new 4K restoration
- Mary Jane's Not a Virgin Anymore – new 4K restoration
- The Night Comes for Us
- Overlord
- The Perfection
- Savage
- Starfish
- Strike, Dear Mistress, and Cure His Heart
- Sudden Fury – new restoration
- The Trip Back
- The Unthinkable
- You Might be the Killer

International Premieres

- Madam Yankelova's Fine Literature Club
- Werewolf

North American Premieres

- Suspiria
- The Bouncer
- Dachra
- Deadly Games
- Fugue
- Keep an Eye Out
- Knife + Heart
- The Man Who Killed Don Quixote
- May the Devil Take You
- Modest Heroes: Ponoc Short Films Theatre, Vol 1
- Murder Me, Monster
- Open 24 Hours
- Quit Your Life
- School's Out
- When the Trees Fall
- White Fire – 2K restoration
- The Wolf House

U.S. Premieres

- The Angel
- Cam
- Climax
- Close Enemies
- Dog
- Donnybrook
- Halloween
- Hold the Dark
- In Fabric
- The Innocent
- I Used to Be Normal: A Boyband Fangirl Story
- Ladyworld
- Luz
- Mid90s
- Shadow
- The Standoff at Sparrow Creek
- The Night Shifter
- Terrified
- Tumbbad
- Under the Silver Lake
- The Wind

Regional Premieres

- Ban Geum-ryeon
- The Blood of Wolves
- Deadwax
- Laika
- Violence Voyager
- The World is Yours

Texas Premieres

- Bad Times at the El Royale
- The Bastards' Fig Tree
- Border
- Burning
- Chained for Life
- Destroyer
- Dogman
- An Evening with Beverly Luff Linn
- Life After Flash
- Lords of Chaos
- One Cut of the Dead
- Piercing
- The Quake
- Slut in a Good Way

Austin Premieres

- The Guilty
- Holiday

=== Retrospective Screenings ===
- Blood Lake
- Flash Gordon

=== Shorts ===
==== Fantastic Shorts ====
- Hi-Five the Cactus
- O.I.
- Petite Avarie
- Pizzamonster
- Puppet Master
- Space Flower
- Squirrel

==== Short Fuse Presented by Stage 13 ====
- Acid
- Chowboys: An American Folktale
- Drum Wave
- A Haunting
- Helsinki Mansplaining Massacre
- Riley Was Here
- Songbird
- Special Day
- Stigma

==== Shorts with Legs ====
- The Beaning
- Cold Fish
- Emotion 93
- Entropia
- Hair: The Story of Grass
- Pan
- The Passage

==== Shorts with Kimchi: Korean Short Film Sidebar ====
- Human Stone
- The Lady from 406
- Lal La Land
- Pepper
- Unknown Woman

==== Paired with Features ====
- Albatross Soup
- Bedridden
- The Bloody Ballad of Squirt Reynolds
- Catcalls
- Caterpillarplasty
- CC
- End Times
- Feast on the Young
- Floor 9.5
- Goodnight
- Gutter
- Information Superhighway
- Keep Your Mouth Shut
- Laura & Vineta
- Liquid Soul
- The Menu
- Monstagram
- Monster Challenge
- My Name Is Marc, And You Can Count On It
- Occupant
- Rosalina
- Salt
- The Slows
- Sprites
- A Thing of Dreams
- Time Enforcer

=== Award Winners ===
"Main Competition" Features

- Best Picture: DONNYBROOK directed by Tim Sulton
- Best Director: Peter Strickland for IN FABRIC

"Next Wave" Features

- Best Picture/Director: HOLIDAY directed by Isabella Eklöf
- Special Mention for Sébastien Marnier for School's Out (L'Heure de la sortie)

"Horror" Features

- Best Picture: TERRIFIED directed by Demián Rugna
- Best Director: Shinichiro Ueda for ONE CUT OF THE DEAD
- Special Mention to LUZ directed by Tilman Singer

"Audience Award" Winner

- Audience Award Winner: ONE CUT OF THE DEAD directed by Shinichiro Ueda
- 1st Runner-Up: THE GUILTY directed by Gustav Möller
- 2nd Runner-Up: AFTER THE SCREAMING STOPS directed by Joe Pearlman and David Soutar

Short With Legs

- Best Picture: THE PASSAGE directed by Kitao Sakurai
- Special Mention to EMOTION 93 directed by Oz Davidson

Short Fuse: Horror Shorts

- Best Picture: ACID (aka ACIDE) directed by Just Philippot

Fantastic Shorts

- Best Picture: SQUIRREL directed by Alex Kavutskiy

Fantastic Bumper Competition

- DARK BIDDINGS directed by Jensen Yancey

== 2019 ==
The 2019 festival took place at the Alamo Drafthouse South Lamar from Sept. 19–26.

=== World Premieres ===
- 100 Best Kills - The Sweetest Taboo
- Amigo
- Bloody Birthday - new restoration
- Butt Boy
- The Cleansing Hour
- Climate of the Hunter
- Cosmic Candy
- Fractured
- Genndy Tartakovsky’s Primal
- In the Shadow of the Moon
- In the Tall Grass
- The McPherson Tape - new preservation
- The Mortuary Collection
- Nail in the Coffin - The Fall and Rise of Vampiro
- Night Drive
- Night Has Come
- The Peanut Butter Solution - new 2K restoration
- Random Acts of Violence
- Reflections of Evil - new preservation
- She Mob - 2K preservation
- Tammy and the T-Rex - fully restoration
- VFW
- Vhyes
- The Wave
- We Summon the Darkness
- Wrinkles in the Clown
- Wyrm

International Premieres

- Homewrecker
- Phil Tippett - Mad Dreams and Monsters

North American Premieres

- 4x4
- Abou Leila
- Adoration
- Blood Machines
- Deerskin
- Die Kinder der Toten
- The Golden Glove
- Iron Fists and Kung Fu Kicks
- Keep Me Company
- Patrick
- Rock, Paper, and Scissors
- The True Adventures of Wolfboy

U.S. Premieres

- The Antenna
- Color Out of Space
- The Deeper You Dig
- Dogs Don't Wear Pants
- First Love
- Guns Akimbo
- I Lost My Body
- Jallikattu
- Jojo Rabbit
- The Long Walk
- Nobadi
- The Other Lamb
- Pelican Blood
- The Platform
- Ride Your Wave
- Saint Maud
- Scream, Queen! My Nightmare on Elm Street
- Son of the White Mare
- Synchronic
- Vivarium
- The Whistlers

Texas Premieres

- After Midnight
- Bliss in 35mm
- Come to Daddy
- Dolemite Is My Name
- Happy Face
- Knives and Skin
- Koko-di Koko-da
- The Last to See Them
- Limbo - new preservation
- The Lodge
- Memory: The Origins of Alien
- Parasite
- The Pool
- Swallow
- Sweetheart
- The Vast of Night
- Why Don't You Just Die!
- You Don't Nomi

Austin Premieres

- The Death of Dick Long

=== Retrospective Screenings ===
- The Black Pit of Dr. M
- Lyle
- A Nightmare on Elm Street 2: Freddy's Revenge in 35mm
- Prey
- The Ship of Monsters
- Trampa Infernal

=== Horror Features ===
- The Color Out of Space

== 2020 ==
In 2020, due to the prevalence of COVID-19, the physical festival was canceled. Instead, they held a completely free, virtual festival with a reduced lineup called Celebration of Fantastic Fest. The virtual event also included two special physical screenings and virtual parties.

World Premieres

- Action U.S.A (world premiere of the 4K restoration)
- Bloodthirsty (dir. Amelia Moses)
- The Boy Behind The Door (dir. David Charbonier & Justin Powell)
- Daughters of Darkness (world premiere of the 4k restoration)
- The Stylist (dir. Jill Gevargizian)
- How To Deter a Robber (dir. Maria Bissell)

International Premieres

- Laughter (dir. Martin Laroche)
- Teddy (dir. Ludovic Boukherma & Zoran Boukherma)

North American Premieres

- Queen of Black Magic (dir. Kimo Stamboel)

US Premieres

- Girl (dir. Chad Faust)
- The Old Man Movie (Mikk Mägi & Oskar Lehemaa)

Texas Premieres

- Possessor (dir. Brandon Cronenberg)
- The Wolf of Snow Hollow (dir. Jim Cummings)

Austin Premieres

AGFA presents Triple Fisher: The Lethal Lolitas of Long Island (dir. Dan Kapelovitz)

== 2021 ==
The 2021 festival took place at the Alamo Drafthouse South Lamar from 23 to 30 September. The festival was held in reformated structure due to restrictions of COVID-19 pandemic aftermath.

=== Feature films ===
- A Banquet
- After Blue
- Agnes
- Alone With You
- Benedetta – (secret screening)
- The Beta Test
- Belle
- Beyond the Infinite 2 Minutes
- Bingo Hell
- Black Friday
- The Black Phone
- Cannon Arm and the Arcade Quest
- Dead & Beautiful
- Dealer
- The Deer King
- Devil Story
- Fangs aka Snakes (1974)
- The Found Footage Phenomenon
- Hellbender
- The Innocents
- Iké Boys
- King Car
- Lamb
- Last Night in Soho – (secret screening with Q&A by director Edgar Wright)
- Let the Wrong One In
- Limbo
- Luzifer
- Masking Threshold
- Mother Schmuckers
- Name Above Title
- Once Upon a time in Uganda
- Preman
- The Sadness
- Silent Night
- Slumber Party Massacre
- Sweetie, You Won't Believe It
- There's Someone Inside Your House
- Titane
- The Trip
- The United States of Insanity
- V/H/S/94
- Woodlands Dark and Days Bewitched

== 2022 ==
The 2022 festival took place at the Alamo Drafthouse in South Lamar, Austin, Texas from September 22 to September 29, with virtual screenings taking place from September 29 to October 4.

=== World premieres ===
- Amazing Elisa (Sadrac González-Perellón, Spain, 2022)
- The Antares Paradox (Luis Tinoco Pineda, Spain 2022)
- Birdemic 3: Sea Eagle (James Nguyen, US, 2022)
- Blood Flower (Dain Said, Malaysia, 2022)
- Blood Relatives (Noah Segan, US, 2022)
- Disappear Completely (Luis Javier Henaine, Mexico, 2022)
- Flowing (Paolo Strippoli, Italy, Belgium, 2022)
- Garcia! (Eugenio Mira, Spain, 2022; first 2 episodes)
- Kids vs. Aliens (Jason Eisener, US, 2022)
- King on Screen (Daphné Baiwir, France, US, 2022)
- Hellraiser (David Bruckner, US, 2022; secret screening with Q&A by director and cast members)
- Hundreds of Beavers (Mike Cheslik, US, 2022)
- The Legacy of The Texas Chain Saw Massacre (Phillip Escott, United Kingdom, 2022)
- Mister Organ (David Farrier, New Zealand, 2022)
- NightMare (Kjersti Helen Rasmussen, Norway, 2022)
- Razzennest (Johannes Grenzfurthner, Austria, 2022; Burnt Ends showcase)
- Satanic Hispanics (Mike Mendez, Demian Rugna, Eduardo Sánchez, Gigi Saul Guerrero & Alejandro Brugués, US, Mexico, Argentina, 2022)
- Smile (Parker Finn, US, 2022)
- Solomon King (Jack Bomay & Sal Watts, US, 1974; 4K Restoration)
- Spoonful of Sugar (Mercedes Bryce Morgan, US, 2022)
- The Stairway to Stardom Mixtape (AFGA, US, 2022)
- Video Diary of a Lost Girl (Lindsay Denniberg, US, 2022; new preservation)
- Terminal USA (Jon Moritsugu, US, 1993; 4K restoration)
- Werewolf by Night (Michael Giacchino, US, 2022; secret screening)

=== US Premieres ===
- The Banshees of Inisherin (Martin McDonagh, UK/Ireland, US, 2022)
- Country Gold (Mickey Reece, US, 2022)
- Decision to Leave (Park Chan-wook, South Korea, 2022)
- Demigod: The Legend Begins (Chris Huang Wen Chang, Taiwan, 2022)
- The Elderly (Raúl Cerezo & Fernando González Gómez, Spain, 2022)
- Final Cut (Michel Hazanavicius, France, 2022)
- Give Me Pity! (Amanda Kramer, US, 2022)
- Joint Security Area (Park Chan-wook, South Korea, 2000; restoration)
- La Pietà (Eduardo Casanova, Spain, Argentina, 2022)
- Manticore (Carlos Vermut, Spain, 2022)
- The Menu (Mark Mylod, US, 2022)
- Missing (Shinzô Katayama, Japan, 2021)
- Nightsiren (Tereza Nvotová, Slovakia, Czech Republic, 2022)
- The Offering (Oliver Park, US, 2022)
- The People's Joker (Vera Drew, US, 2022)
- Project Wolf Hunting (Kim Hongsun, South Korea, 2022)
- Sick (John Hyams, US, 2022)
- Sick of Myself (Kristoffer Borgli, Norway, Sweden, 2022)
- Triangle of Sadness (Ruben Östlund, Sweden, 2022)
- Unicorn Wars (Alberto Vázquez, Spain, France, 2022)
- V/H/S/99 (Johannes Roberts, Maggie Levin, Flying Lotus, Tyler MacIntyre, Vanessa Winter & Joseph Winter, US, 2022)
- Venus (Jaume Balagueró, Spain, 2022)
- Vesper (Kristina Buožytė & Bruno Samper, Belgium, France, Lithuania, 2022)

=== International premieres ===
- Evil Eye (Isaac Ezban, Mexico, 2022)
- Nothing (Trine Piil & Seamus McNally, Denmark, Germany, 2022)

=== North-American premieres ===
- Aatank (Prem Lalwani & Desh Mukherjee, India, 1996)
- Bad City (Kensuke Sonomura, Japan, 2022)
- Deep Fear (Grégory Beghin, France, 2022)
- Everyone Will Burn (Davier Hebrero, Spain, 2021)
- The Five Devils (Léa Mysius, France, 2022)
- Gamera vs. Zigra (Noriaki Yuasa, Japan, 1971)
- H4Z4RD (Jonas Govaerts, Belgium, 2022)
- Medusa Deluxe (Thomas Hardiman, United Kingdom, 2022)
- The Strange Case of Jacky Caillou (Lucas Delangle, France, 2022)
- Terrifier 2 (Damien Leone, US, 2022)
- Tropic (Edouard Salier, France, 2022)
- The Visitor From the Future (François Descraques, France, 2022)
- Year of the Shark (Ludovic Boukherma & Zoran Boukherma, France, 2022)

Texas premieres

- A Life on the Farm (Oscar Harding, United Kingdom, 2022)
- All Jacked Up and Full of Worms (Alex Phillips, US, 2022)
- A Wounded Fawn (Travis Stevens, US, 2022)
- Attachment (Gabriel Bier Gislason, Denmark, 2022)
- Bones and All (Luca Guadagnino, US, 2022)
- Family Dinner (Peter Hengl, Austria, 2022)
- Holy Spider (Ali Abassi, Denmark, 2022)
- Huesera: The Bone Woman (Michelle Garza Cervera, Mexico, 2022)
- Hunt (Lee Jung-jae, South Korea, 2022)
- Leonor Will Never Die (Martika Ramirez Escobar, Philippines, 2022)
- Living with Chucky (Kyra Gardner, US, 2022)
- Lynch/Oz (Alexandre O. Philippe, US, 2022)
- Mako: The Jaws of Death (William Grefé, US, 1976)
- Oink (Mascha Halberstad, The Netherlands, 2022)
- One and Four (Jigme Trinley, China, 2022)
- Piggy (Carlota Pereda, Spain, 2022)
- Shin Ultraman (Shinji Higuchi, Japan, 2022)
- Smoking Causes Coughing (Quentin Dupieux, France, 2022)
- Something in the Dirt (Justin Benson & Aaron Moorhead, US, 2022)
- Swallowed (Carter Smith, US, 2022)
- Ultraman 4K Edition (Samaji Nonagase, Hajime Tsuburaya & Akio Jissoji, Japan, 1966)
- Unidentified Objects (Juan Felipe Zuleta, US, 2022)
- We Might As Well Be Dead (Natalia Sinelnikova, Germany, Romania, 2022)

Austin premieres

- Chop & Steele (Ben Steinbauer & Berndt Mader, US, 2022)

Shark Attack Sidebar

- 12 Days of Terror (Jack Sholder, US, 2004)
- Aatank (Prem Lalwani & Desh Mukherjee, India, 1996)
- Gamera vs. Zigra (Noriaki Yuasa, Japan, 1971)
- Mako: The Jaws of Death (William Grefé, US, 1976)
- Tintorera! (René Cardona Jr., Mexico, United Kingdom, 1977)

Official Competition Selection

- Amazing Elisa (Sadrac González-Perellón, Spain, 2022)
- Holy Spider (Ali Abassi, Denmark, 2022)
- Huesera (Michelle Garza Cervera, Mexico, Peru, 2022)
- La Pietà (Eduardo Casanova, Spain, Argentina, 2022)
- NightMare (Kjersti Helen Rasmussen, Norway, 2022)
- Nightsiren (Tereza Nvotová, Slovakia, Czech Republic, 2022)
- Spoonful of Sugar (Mercedes Bryce Morgan, US, 2022)
- Year of the Shark (Ludovic Boukherma & Zoran Boukherma, France, 2022)

Horror Competition Selection

- Blood Flower (Dain Said, Malaysia, 2022)
- Deep Fear (Grégory Beghin, France, 2022)
- Piggy (Carlota Pereda, Spain, 2022)
- Project Wolf Hunting (Kim Hongsun, South Korea, 2022)
- Satanic Hispanics (Mike Mendez, Demian Rugna, Eduardo Sánchez, Gigi Saul Guerrero & Alejandro Brugués, US, Mexico, Argentina, 2022)
- Terrifier 2 (Damien Leone, US, 2022)
- V/H/S/99 (Johannes Roberts, Maggie Levin, Flying Lotus, Tyler MacIntyre, Vanessa Winter & Joseph Winter, US, 2022)
- Venus (Jaume Balagueró, Spain, 2022)

Next Wave Competition

- Everyone Will Burn (Davier Hebrero, Spain, 2021)
- Family Dinner (Peter Hengl, Austria, 2022)
- Flowing (Paolo Strippoli, Italy, Belgium, 2022)
- Leonor Will Never Die (Martika Ramirez Escobar, Philippines, 2022)
- Medusa Deluxe (Thomas Hardiman, United Kingdom, 2022)
- The Five Devils (Léa Mysius, France, 2022)
- Tropic (Edouard Salier, France, 2022)
- We Might As Well Be Dead (Natalia Sinelnikova, Germany, Romania, 2022)

Jurors

Official Competition

- Liane Cunje (Canada)
- Jongsuk Thomas Nam (South Korea)
- Lars Nilsen (US)

Horror Competition

- Johannes Grenzfurthner (Austria)
- Adam Koehler (US)
- Caryn Coleman (US)

Next Wave Competition

- Liz Purchell (US)
- Kerry Deignan Roy (US)
- Drew Taylore (US)

Short Films Competition

- Brad Abrahams (US)
- Michelle Garza (Mexico)
- Addison Heiman (US)

== 2023 ==
The 2023 festival took place at the Alamo Drafthouse in South Lamar, Austin, Texas from September 21 to September 28.

=== World premieres ===
- 30 Coins (Álex de la Iglesia, Spain, season 2, episodes 1−2)
- The All Golden (Nate Wilson, Canada, 2023)
- Bark (Marc Schölermann, Germany, 2023)
- Blonde Death (James Robert Baker, US, 1984, restoration)
- Crumb Catcher (Chris Skotchdopole, US, 2023)
- The Cult of AGFA Trailer Show (Joseph A. Ziemba & Bret Berg, US, 2023, 35mm restoration)
- Everything Is Terrible! presents 100 BEST KILLS: SATAN
- The Fall of the House of Usher (Mike Flanagan, US, 2023, episodes 1−2)
- I'll Crush Y'all (Kike Narcea, Spain, 2023)
- Jackdaw (Jamie Childs, UK, 2023)
- The Jar (Charon) (Bruce Tuscano, US, 1984, restoration)
- Kill Dolly Kill (Heidi Moore, US, 2023)
- The Last Stop in Yuma County (Francis Galluppi, US, 2023)
- The Last Video Store (Cody Kennedy & Tim Rutherford, Canada, 2023)
- Messiah of Evil (Gloria Katz & Willard Huyck, US, 1974, 35 mm restoration)
- Mushrooms (Paweł Borowski, Poland, 2023)
- Pet Sematary: Bloodlines (Lindsey Anderson Beer, US/Canada, 2023)
- So Unreal (Amanda Kramer, US, 2023)
- Spooktacular! (Quinn Monahan, US, 2023)
- Stopmotion (Robert Morgan, UK, 2023)
- Strange Darling (JT Mollner, US, 2023)
- Suburban Tale (Stephen Alexander, India, 2023)
- There's Something in the Barn (Magnus Martens, Norway, 2023)
- Totally Killer (Nahnatchka Khan, US, 2023)
- The Toxic Avenger (Macon Blair, US, 2023)
- V/H/S/85 (David Bruckner, Gigi Saul Guerrero, Natasha Kermani, Mike Nelson, & Scott Derrickson, US, 2023)
- Visitors (Complete edition) (Kenichi Ugana, Japan, 2023)
- Wake Up (RKSS, France, 2023)
- You Are Not Me (Marisa Crespo & Moisés Romera, Spain, 2023)

=== International premieres ===
- The Deep Dark (Mathieu Turi, France, 2023)
- Salem (Jean-Bernard Marlin, France, 2023)
- We Are Zombies (RKSS, France/Canada, 2023)

=== North American premieres ===
- Acid (Just Philippot, France, 2023)
- The Altman Method (Nadav Aronowicz, Israel, 2022)
- The Animal Kingdom (Thomas Cailley, France, 2023)
- The Book of Solutions (Michel Gondry, France, 2023)
- Caligula: The Ultimate Cut (US/Italy, 1980)
- The Coffee Table (Caye Casas, Spain, 2022)
- Door (Banmei Takahashi, Japan, 1988)
- Falling Stars (Richard Karpala & Gabriel Bienczycki, US, 2023)
- A Guide to Becoming an Elm Tree (Skye & Adam Mann, Ireland, 2023)
- The Invisible Fight (Rainer Sarnet, Estonia/Latvia/Greece/Finland, 2023)
- Mancunian Man: The Legendary Life of Cliff Twemlow (Jake West, UK, 2023)
- One-Percenter (Yûdai Yamaguchi, Japan, 2023)
- The Origin (Andrew Cumming, UK, 2023)
- The Other Laurens (Claude Schmitz, Belgium/France, 2023)
- Project Silence (Tae-gon Kim, South Korea, 2023)
- Property (Daniel Bandeire, Brazil, 2022)
- Rage (Jorge Michel Grau, Mexico, 2023)
- Restore Point (Robert Hloz, Czech Republic, 2023)
- Scala!!! (Jane Giles & Ali Catterall, UK, 2023)
- Sri Asih: The Warrior (Upi Avianto, Indonesia, 2022)
- Triggered (Richard V. Somes, Philippines, 2023)
- UFO Sweden (Victor Danell, Sweden, 2022)
- Infested (Sébastien Vaniček, France, 2023)
- The Wait (F. Javier Gutiérrez, Spain, 2023)

=== US premieres ===
- 100 Yards (Xu Haofeng & Xu Junfeng, China, 2023)
- Baby Assassins 2 (Hugo Sakamoto, Japan, 2023)
- Cobweb (Kim Jee-woon, South Korea, 2023)
- The Fantastic Golem Affairs (Burnin’ Percebes, Spain, 2023)
- Kennedy (Anurag Kashyap, India, 2023)
- Letters to the Postman (Felix Dembinski, UK, 2022)
- Riddle of Fire (Weston Razooli, US, 2023)
- River (Junta Yamaguchi, Japan, 2023)
- The Sacrifice Game (Jenn Wexler, US/Canada, 2023)
- She Is Conann (Bertrand Mandico, France/Luxembourg/Belgium, 2023)
- Sleep (Jason Yu, South Korea, 2023)
- The Strangler (Paul Vecchiali, France, 1970, 2K Restoration)
- Tiger Stripes (Amanda Nell Eu, Malaysia/Taiwan/France/Germany/Netherlands/Indonesia, 2023)
- The Uncle (David Kapac & Andrija Mardešić, Croatia, Serbia, 2022)
- What You Wish For (Nicholas Tomnay, US, 2023)

=== Texas premieres ===
- The Creator (Gareth Edwards, United States, 2023)

=== Special screenings ===
- Saltburn – (secret screening)
- Dream Scenario – (secret screening)
- Dogman – (secret screening)
- Saw X – (secret screening)

== 2024 ==
The 2024 festival took place at the Alamo Drafthouse in South Lamar, Austin, Texas from September 19 to September 26.

=== World premieres ===
- AJ Goes to the Dog Park (Toby Jones, United States, 2024)
- Apartment 7A (Natalie Erika James, United States, 2024)
- Bone Lake (Mercedes Bryce Morgan, United States, 2024)
- Bookworm (Ant Timpson, New Zealand, 2024)
- Daddy's Head (Benjamin Barfoot, United Kingdom, 2024)
- Don't Mess with Grandma (Jason Krawczyk, Canada, 2024)
- Ebony & Ivory (Jim Hosking, United Kingdom, 2024)
- Heads or Fails (Lenny Guit, Harpo Guit, Belgium, 2024)
- Heavier Trip (Juuso Laatio, Jukka Vidgren, Finland, 2024)
- House of Spoils (Bridget Savage Cole, Danielle Krudy, United States, 2024)
- Get Away (Steffen Haars, United Kingdom, 2024)
- Ghost Killer (Kensuke Sonomura, Japan, 2024)
- Little Bites (Spider One, United States, 2024)
- Memoir of a Snail (Adam Elliot, Australia, 2024)
- Mr. Crocket (Brandon Espy, United States, 2024
- Never Let Go (Alexandre Aja, United States, 2024)
- The Rule of Jenny Pen (James Ashcroft, New Zealand, 2024)
- The Severed Sun (Dean Puckett, United Kingdom, 2024)
- Spermageddon (Tommy Wirkola, Rasmus A. Sivertsen, Norway, 2024)
- Strange Harvest (Stuart Ortiz, United States, 2024)
- Teacup (E. L. Katz, United States, 2024)
- Terrifier 3 (Damien Leone, United States, 2024)
- Touched by Eternity (Mārcis Lācis, Latvia, 2024)
- V/H/S/Beyond (Jordan Downey, Christian Long, Justin Long, Justin Martinez, Virat Pal, Kate Siegel, Jay Cheel, United States, 2024)
- What Happened to Dorothy Bell? (Danny Villanueva Jr., United States, 2024)
- Will & Harper (Josh Greenbaum, United States, 2024)
- The Workout (James Cullen Bressack, United States, 2024)

=== International premieres ===
- Binary (David-Jan Bronsgeest, The Netherlands, 2024)
- Children of the Wicker Man (Justin Hardy, United Kingdom, 2024)
- The Draft! (Yusron Fuadi, Indonesia, 2023)
- Frankie Freako (Steven Kostanski, Canada, 2024)
- Planet B (Aude Léa Rapin, France, Belgium, 2024)
- Trizombie (Mārcis Lācis, Belgium, 2024)
- White Wieven (Didier Konings, Netherlands, 2024)
- Zénithal (Jean-Baptiste Saurel, France, 2024)

=== North American premieres ===
- Animale (Emma Benestan, France, 2024)
- Baby Invasion (Harmony Korine, United States, 2024)
- The Black Hole (Moonika Siimets, Estonia, Finland, 2024)
- Body Odyssey (Grazia Tricarico, Italy, Switzerland, 2023)
- Dragon Dilatation (Bertrand Mandico, France, 2024)
- Gazer (Ryan J. Sloan, United States, 2024)
- The Life and Deaths of Christopher Lee (Jon Spira, United Kingdom, 2024)
- Mads (David Moreau, France, 2024)
- Maldoror (Fabrice du Welz, Belgium, France, 2024)
- Night Call (Michiel Blanchart, France, Belgium, 2024)
- Plastic Guns (Jean-Christophe Meurisse, France, 2024)
- Queens of Drama (Alexis Langlois, France, Belgium, 2024)
- Sister Midnight (Karan Kandhari, United Kingdom, India, Sweden, 2024)

=== United States premieres ===
- Bring Them Down (Christopher Andrews, Ireland, United Kingdom, Belgium, 2024)
- Chainsaws were Singing (Sander Maran, Estonia, 2024)
- Cloud (Kiyoshi Kurosawa, Japan, 2024)
- Daniela Forever (Nacho Vigalondo, Spain, Belgium, 2024)
- Dead Talents Society (John Hsu, Taiwan, 2024)
- Else (Thibault Emin, France, 2024)
- Escape from the 21st Century (Li Yang, China, 2024)
- I, The Executioner (Ryoo Seung-wan, South Korea, 2024)
- Ick (Joseph Kahn, United States, 2024)
- Párvulos (Isaac Ezban, Mexico, 2024)
- Steppenwolf (Adilkhan Yerzhanov, Kazakhstan, 2024)
- U Are the Universe (Pavlo Ostrikov, Ukraine, 2024)
- Universal Language (Matthew Rankin, Canada, 2024)

=== Texas premieres ===
- Baby Assassins Nice Days (Yugo Sakamoto, Japan, 2024)
- Carnival of Blood (Leonard Kirtman, United States, 1970)
- Chain Reactions (Alexandre O. Philippe, United States, 2024)
- A Different Man (Aaron Schimberg, United States, 2024)
- Girl Internet Show: A Kati Kelli Mixtape (Kati Kelli, United States, 2024)
- Megalopolis (Francis Ford Coppola, United States, 2024)
- The Remarkable Life of Ibelin (Benjamin Ree, Norway, 2024)
- Respati (Sidharta Tata, Indonesia, 2024)
- She Loved Blossoms More (Yannis Veslemes, Greece, France, 2024)

=== Austin premieres ===
- Anora (Sean Baker, United States, 2024)

=== Arab Genre Rises presentation ===
- Down is the New Up (Camille Cabbabe, Lebanon, 2017)
- How my Grandmother Became a Chair (Nicolas Fattouh, Germany, Lebanon, Qatar, 2021)
- J'ai Le Cafard (Maysaa Almumin, Kuwait, Egypt, Qatar, 2021)
- Last Days of the Man of Tomorrow (Fadi Baki, Lebanon, Germany, 2017)
- Nation Estate (Larissa Sansour, Palestine, Denmark, 2012)
- Night Shift (Ali Faisal Mostafa, United Arab Emirates, 2022)
- So What If the Goats Die (Sofia Alaoui, France, Morocco, 2020)

=== Special screenings ===
- The Babadook (10th anniversary screening)
- Big Top Pee-Wee (World premiere of 4K restoration)
- The Birthday (20th anniversary screening)
- Disembodied (World premiere of 4K restoration)
- The Fall (North American premiere of 4K restoration)
- The Guest (World premiere of 4K restoration)
- The Incredibly Strange Creatures Who Stopped Living and Became Mixed-Up Zombies!!? (Texas premiere of Severin restoration)
- Mac and Me
- The Mission (25th anniversary screening)
- Nine Queens (United States premiere of 4K restoration)
- Raze (Anniversary screening)
- Satan War (World premiere of restoration)
- Wake in Fright (International premiere of 4K restoration)
- Saturday Night – (secret screening)
- The Apprentice – (secret screening)
- Heretic – (secret screening)
- Better Man – (secret screening)
- The Creep Tapes – (secret screening)

== 2025 ==
The 2025 festival took place at the Alamo Drafthouse in South Lamar, Austin, Texas from September 18 to September 25.

=== World premieres ===
- Bad Haircut (Kyle Misak, US, 2025)
- Black Phone 2 (Scott Derrickson, US, 2025)
- Body Blow (Dean Francis, Australia, 2025)
- Camp (Avalon Fast, Canada, 2025)
- Coyotes (Colin Minihan, US, 2025)
- Crazy Old Lady (Martín Mauregui, Argentina, 2025)
- The Creep Tapes (Patrick Brice, US, Season 2 Episodes 1-3)
- The Curse (Kenichi Ugana, Japan, 2025)
- Dawning (Patrik Syversen, Norway, 2025)
- Deathgasm 2: Goremageddon (Jason Lei Howden, New Zealand, 2025)
- Decorado (Alberto Vázquez, Spain, 2025)
- Dinner to Die For (Diana Mills Smith, South Africa, 2025)
- Disforia (Christopher Cartagena, Spain, 2025)
- Dolly (Rod Blackhurst, US, 2025)
- The Evil That Binds Us (Nico Postiglione, Chile, 2025)
- Haunted Heist (Lil Rel Howery, US, 2025)
- Ikatan Darah (Sidharta Tata, Indonesia, 2025)
- Luger (Bruno Martín, Spain, 2025)
- Meat Kills (Martijn Smits, The Netherlands, 2025)
- Night Patrol (Ryan Prows, US, 2025)
- Penance (Nikolas Pelekai, US, 2025)
- Primate (Johannes Roberts, US, 2025)
- The Restoration at Grayson Manor (Glenn McQuaid, Ireland/Austria, 2025)
- Road to Vendetta (Njo Kui Ying, Japan, 2025)
- Shrine of Abominations (Skinner & Ross Kennedy, US, 2025)
- Silver Screamers (Sean Cisterna, Canada, 2025)
- Sisu: Road to Revenge (Jalmari Helander, Finland, 2025)
- The Strangers - Chapter 2 (Renny Harlin, US, 2025)
- Theater is Dead (Katherine Dudas, US, 2025)
- The Tree of Knowledge (Eugène Green, Portugal/France, 2025)
- V/H/S/Halloween (Bryan M. Ferguson, Casper Kelly, Micheline Pitt-Norman & R.H. Norman, Alex Ross Perry, Paco Plaza, Anna Zlokovic, US, 2025)
- Vicious (Bryan Bertino, US, 2025)
- The Vile (Majid Al Ansari, UAE, 2025)
- Whistle (Corin Hardy, US, 2025)
- A Woman Called Mother (Randolph Zaini, Indonesia, 2025)

=== International premieres ===
- 13 Days Till Summer (Bartosz M. Kowalski, Poland, 2025)
- The Holy Boy (Paolo Strippoli, Italy/Slovenia, 2025)
- Nesting (Chloé Cinq-Mars, Canada, 2025)
- Tie Man (Rémi Fréchette, Canada, 2025)

=== North American premieres ===
- Appofeniacs (Chris Marrs Piliero, US, 2025)
- Beast of War (Kiah Roache-Turner, Australia, 2025)
- Bulk (Ben Wheatley, UK, 2025)
- Crushed (Simon Rumley, UK, 2025)
- Deathstalker (Steven Kostanski, Canada, 2025)
- Dracula (Radu Jude, Romania, 2025)
- Her Will Be Done (Julia Kowalski, France/Poland, 2025)
- The Piano Accident (Quentin Dupieux, France, 2025)
- The Plague (Charlie Polinger, Romania, 2025)
- Silence (Eduardo Casanova, Spain, 2025)

=== US premieres ===
- Don’t Leave the Kids Alone (Emilio Portes, Mexico, 2025)
- Find Your Friends (Izabel Pakzad, Italy, 2025)
- The Forbidden City (Gabriele Mainetti, Italy, 2025)
- Fuck My Son! (Todd Rohal, US, 2025)
- Honey Bunch (Madeleine Sims-Fewer & Dusty Mancinelli, Canada, 2025)
- The Ice Tower (Lucile Hadžihalilović, France, 2025)
- Marama (Taratoa Stappard, New Zealand, 2025)
- Mother of Flies (Toby Poser, John Adams, & Zelda Adams, US, 2025)
- Obsession (Curry Barker, US, 2025)
- Shelby Oaks (Chris Stuckmann, US, 2024)
- Sirat (Oliver Laxe, France/Spain, 2025)
- A Useful Ghost (Ratchapoom Boonbunchachoke, Thailand, 2025)

=== Texas premieres ===
- If I Had Legs I’d Kick You (Mary Bronstein, US, 2025)
- Night Stage (Marcio Reolon & Filipe Matzembacher, Brazil, 2025)
- Reflection in a Dead Diamond (Hélène Cattet and Bruno Forzani, Belgium/Luxembourg, 2025)

=== Special screenings ===
- Angel’s Egg (Mamoru Oshii, Japan, 1985) - Repertory Screening
- Before the Fall (F. Javier Gutierrez, Spain, 2008) - Repertory Screening
- Bride of Re-Animator (Brian Yuzna, US, 1990) - Repertory Screening, World Premiere of 4K Restoration
- Bugonia (Yorgos Lanthimos, Greece, 2025) - Secret Screening
- Chocolate (Prachya Pinkaew, Thailand, 2008) - Repertory Screening, Premiere of 35mm Print
- Cruel Jaws (Bruno Mattei, Italy, 1995) - Repertory Screening, Texas Premiere of Restoration
- Dildo Heaven (Doris Wishman, US, 2002) - Repertory Screening, World Premiere of Restoration
- Embalmer (S. Torriano Berry, US, 1996) - Repertory Screening, World Premiere of Preservation
- Folies Meurtrieres (Antoine Pelissier, France, 1984) - Repertory Screening, World Premiere of Restoration
- Freaked (Tom Stern & Alex Winter, US, 1994) - Repertory Screening, World Premiere of 4K Restoration
- Good Luck, Have Fun, Don’t Die (Gore Verbinski, US, 2025) - Secret Screening, World Premiere
- Hide and Go Shriek (Skip Schoolnik, US, 1988) - Repertory Screening, World Premiere of 4K Restoration
- One Battle After Another (Paul Thomas Anderson, US, 2025) - Secret Screening
- Silent Night, Deadly Night (Mike P. Nelson, US, 2025) - Secret Screening, World Premiere

== 2026 ==
The 2026 festival took place at the Alamo Drafthouse in South Lamar, Austin, Texas from September 17 to September 24.

=== World Premieres ===
- Adult Supervision (Alex Schulman, Sweden, 2026)
- Beware Boiúna (Mike P. Nelson, US, 2026)
- The Cycle (Jordan Downey, US, 2026)
- Death of a Yellow Bird (Cody Calahan, Canada, 2026)
- Flapjax (Rocko Zevenbergen, US/Canada, 2026)
- Girl in the Night (Luka Marčetić, Slovenia, 2026)
- Godmother (John Veron, US, 2026)
- The Heretiks (Gregg Bishop, US, 2026)
- I Have Proof (James Cullen Bressack, US, 2026)
- Into the Sky (Evan Wolf Buxbaum & Drew Mylrea, US, 2026)
- Jollyface (Justin Floyd, US, 2026)
- Kung Fu Deadly (Fergal Costello, Ireland/Australia, 2026)
- Kylgor in the Grisly Abyss (Mason Jeffrey Newton-DeRushie, Canada, 2026)
- Magick Mtn. (Hana Mae Lee & Hal Satin, US, 2026)
- Mr. Creamjean's Hidey Hole (Heath Benfield, US, 2026)
- No Way Down (Mohamed Chabane & Théo Jourdain, France, 2026)
- Pathetic Fallacy (Adam Egypt Mortimer, US, 2026)
- Phreaker (Adam Yorke, Canada, 2026)
- Platypus (Joshua Gratton, Canada, 2026)
- Play House (Nicolas Jon Curcio, US, 2026)
- Posthumous (Josh Tanner, Australia, 2026)
- Red Snow (Ilja Rautsi, Finland/Estonia/Sweden, 2026)
- Sick (Agata Trzebuchowska, Poland, 2026)
- The Swallow (Kevin Kölsch & Dennis Widmyer, US, 2026)
- Upiro (Óscar Martín, Spain, 2026)
- Ürei (Yerkezhan Baizhan, Kazakhsta, 2026)
- What Happened to Doris? (Nick Simon, US, 2026)

=== International Premieres ===
- 5 More Minutes (Javier Ruiz Caldera, Spain, 2026)
- Dog God (Ing K, Thailand, 1997) - Banned film
- Game Master (Éric Judor, France, 2026)
- Half (Samjad, India, 2026)
- The Squirrel (Markus Lehmusruusu, Finland/Germany/The Netherlands/Sweden, 2026)

=== North American Premieres ===
- 3 Weeks After (Miroslav Terzić, Serbia/Bulgaria/Italy/Croatia/Luxembourg, 2026)
- The Birthday Party (Léa Mysius, France, 2026)
- The Blood Countess (Ulrike Ottinger, Austria/Germany/Luxembourg, 2026)
- Bloody Tennis (Nikias Chryssos, Germany, 2026)
- Compliance (Kyle Mangione-Smith, US, 2026)
- Death Has No Master (Jorge Thielen Armand, Venezuela/Canada/Italy/Luxembourg, 2026)
- Donkey Princess (Cristóbal León & Joaquín Cociña, Chile/ France/ Netherlands/ Uruguay/ Germany, 2026)
- Full Phil (Quentin Dupieux, France/US, 2026)
- Ghost in the Cell (Joko Anwar, Indonesia, 2026)
- Janur Ireng: Sewu Dino the Prequel (Kimo Stamboel, Indonesia, 2025)
- The Ones Who Grieve (Quarxx, France, 2026)
- A Prayer for the Dying (Dara Van Dusen, Norway/Greece/UK/Sweden, 2026)
- Roma Elastica (Bertrand Mandico, France/Italy, 2026)
- Too Many Beasts (Sarah Arnold, France, 2026)
- Victorian Psycho (Zachary Wigon, UK/Ireland, 2026)
- Welcome to Dolly's House (Seven Ych, Rady Fu, & Tree Muta, Taiwan, 2026)

=== US Premieres ===
- Attack on Paradise (Bob Colaers, Belgium/The Netherlands, 2026)
- Carrie (Mike Flanagan, Canada/US, 2026)
- Corpus (Corrin Evans, US, 2026)
- The Face of Horror (Anna Biller, UK, 2026)
- Future Tense (Jenna Cato Bass, South Africa/Australia, 2026)
- Gimme Truth (Brad Abrahams & Simon Ennis, Canada, 2026)
- The Glorious Dead (John Adams & Toby Poser, US, 2026)
- Jim Queen (Marco Nguyen & Nicolas Athane, France, 2026)
- Kick On (Nick Kozakis, Australia, 2026)
- Little Doors (Anthony Oberbeck, US, 2026)
- No Rest For the Wicked (Kasper Kalle, Denmark, 2026)
- River (Joshua Giuliano, US, 2026)
- The Spiral (Paolo Strippoli, Italy/France/Belgium, 2026)
- Vertiginous (Quientin Dupieux, France, 2026)

=== Texas Premieres ===
- Primetime (Lance Oppenheim, US, 2026)
- Wild Horse Nine (Martin McDonagh, UK/US/Chile, 2026)

=== Special Screenings ===
- Blood Feast (Hershell Gordon Lewis, US, 1963) - World premiere of 4K restoration
- The Thieving Hand (Unknown, US, 1908) - Part of the Cinema Recomposed: Silent Monsters program
- Frankenstein (J. Searle Dawley, US, 1910) - Part of the Cinema Recomposed: Silent Monsters program
- Dr. Jekyll and Mr. Hyde (Lucius J. Henderson, US, 1912) - Part of the Cinema Recomposed: Silent Monsters program
- The Ghost of Slumber Mountain (Willis O'Brien, US, 1919) - Part of the Cinema Recomposed: Silent Monsters program
- Haxan (Benjamin Christensen, Sweden, 1922) - Part of the Cinema Recomposed: Silent Monsters program
- Hells Bells (Ub Iwerks, US, 1929) - Part of the Cinema Recomposed: Silent Monsters program
- The Haunted Ship (John Foster & Mannie Davis, US, 1930) - Part of the Cinema Recomposed: Silent Monsters program
- Extreme Prejudice (Walter Hill, US, 1987)
- Frisk (Todd Veros, US, 1995)
- Hell House (George Ratliff, US, 2001) - World premiere of restoration
- Henry: Portrait of a Serial Killer (John McNaughton, US, 1986) - World premiere of 35mm print
- Ogroff (Norbert Moutier, France, 1983) - World premiere of restoration
- Resident Evil (Zach Cregger, US, 2026) - Gala screening
- Roy From Space (Héctor López Carmona, Mexico, 1983) - World premiere of restoration
- Screamplay (Rufus Butler Seder, US, 1984) - World premiere of 4K restoration
- In a Violent Nature: Part 2 (Nate Wilson, Canada, 2026) - Secret Screening #1, In Progress Screening.
- Alpha Gang (Zellner Brothers, US, 2026) - Secret Screening #2

=== Award Winners ===
Fantastic Fest announced awards for films in competitions:

==== Features ====
Main Competition Features

- Best Picture: Girl in the Night directed by Luka Marčetić
- Best Director: Bertrand Mandico for Roma Elastica
- Special Mention: 5 More Minutes, directed by Javier Ruiz Caldera

Next Wave Features

- Best Picture: Adult Supervision, Alex Schulman
- Best Director: Agata Trzebuchowska for Sick
- Special Mention: Jollyface, directed by Justin Floyd
- Best Performance Special Mentions:
  - Konrad Karol and Katarzyna Lubik in Sick
  - Cole Asher Phillips in Phreaker

Horror Features

- Best Picture: Ghost in the Cell, Joko Anwar
- Best Director: Nikias Chryssos for Bloody Tennis
- Special Mention: The Cycle, Jordan Downey

Audience Award Winner

- Audience Award Winner: 5 More Minutes, Javier Ruiz Caldera

==== Short films ====
Short With Legs

- Best Picture: Sinkpisser, Connor Wiles
- Special Mention: EMOTION 93, Oz Davidson

Short Fuse: Horror Shorts

- Best Picture: Bagman, Connor Gaston and Vaughn Gaston

Fantastic Shorts

- Best Picture: Jimmy’s Custom Coffin, James P. Gannon
- Best Actor: Richard Perez in Richard Goes on a Date, Johnny Frohman

==== Drawn and Quartered ====
- Best Picture: Pre-Parenting, Yu Yu
- Best WTF Short: The Magician, Joe Garber
