= Underwater Love =

Underwater Love may refer to:

- a 1997 hit by English band Smoke city, see Underwater Love (Smoke City song)
- a 2011 Japanese-German movie about a woman and a sea creature, see Underwater Love (film)
- a track from the 1989 album The Real Thing by US band Faith No More
