= Folklore (TV series) =

- Genre: Horror; Anthology
- Created by: Eric Khoo
- Countries of origin: Indonesia; Japan; Thailand; Malaysia; Singapore; South Korea (season 1); Taiwan (season 2); Philippines (season 2)
- No. of seasons: 2
- No. of episodes: 13

Production
- Running time: 60 minutes
- Production company: Zhao Wei Films

Original release
- Network: HBO Asia
- Release: October 7, 2018 – September 16, 2022

Folklore is a television horror anthology series that premiered on HBO Asia on October 7, 2018. On December 1, 2020, it was renewed for a second season.

== Premise ==
Created by Singaporean director Eric Khoo, the six-episode series features stories based on Asian superstitions and national folkloric myths, with each episode helmed by a director from a different country.

== Episodes ==
=== Series overview ===
Season	Episodes	Originally released	
Season	Episodes	First released	Last released
1	6	October 7, 2018	November 11, 2018
2	7	November 14, 2021	September 14, 2022

=== Season 1 (2018) ===
No. overall	No. in season	Title	Directed by	Written by	Country	Language	Original release date
1	1	"A Mother's Love"	Joko Anwar	Joko Anwar	Indonesia	Indonesian	October 7, 2018
A single mother and her young son discover a group of dirty and underfed children living in a mansion's attic. Upon saving them and returning them to their families, she has unknowingly snatched these children from their adopted mother - Wewe Gombel - and must now beware her vengeful wrath. Cast: Marissa Anita, Muzakki Ramdhan
2	2	"Tatami"	Takumi Saitoh	Tomoki Kanazawa & Masato Tanno	Japan	Japanese	October 14, 2018
A murder scene writer returns home to attend his father's funeral and begins to experience constant flashbacks of his childhood. He then discovers a secret door in the house that leads to a room that hides a horrifying secret from his family's past. Cast: Kazuki Kitamura, Misuzu Kanno, Daisuke Kuroda, Shima Onishi
3	3	"Nobody"	Eric Khoo	Amanda Lee Koe	Singapore	Singlish; Malay	October 21, 2018
A Pontianak is awoken when a foreman and a construction worker attempt to bury the body of a dead girl instead of burning her. A series of unfortunate events begin to occur at the construction site. Cast: Li Wen Qiang, Maguire Jian, Sivakumar Palakrishnan, Aric Hidir, Louis Wu, Dayang Nurbalqis
4	4	"Pob"	Pen-Ek Ratanaruang	Pen-Ek Ratanaruang	Thailand	Thai	October 28, 2018
A journalist meets with Pob, a Thai ghost, who confesses to a murder. Finally finding an outlet for complaint, Pob explains how the murder happened and requests for his story to be published. However, the journalist declines and the two make a deal of a lifetime. Cast: Nuttapon Sawasdee, Parama Wutthikornditsakul, Thomas Burton van Blarcom
5	5	"Toyol"	Ho Yuhang	Ho Yuhang	Malaysia	Malay	November 4, 2018
A Member of Parliament (MP) of a fishing town turns to a mysterious woman who possesses shamanistic powers in order to salvage his town's dire economic situation. She fixes all his problems and the two soon become lovers. However, the woman has a dark secret that threatens to destroy his life. Cast: Bront Palarae, Nabila Huda, Redza Minhat
6	6	"Mongdal"	Lee Sang-woo	Lee Sang-woo	South Korea	Korean	November 11, 2018
A mother tries to appease the moods and demands of her borderline psychopathic son. When a new girl comes to town, her son falls quickly and deeply for the new girl and is determined to win her over possibly even against her will. When things take a tragic turn, his mother will stop at nothing to make her son happy even if it means finding a bride to join him in the afterlife. Cast: Lee Chae-yeon, Jung Yoon-seok

=== Season 2 (2021–22) ===
No. overall	No. in season	Title	Directed by	Written by	Country	Language	Original release date
7	1	"The Rope"	Liao Shih-han	Simon Ma	Taiwan	Mandarin	November 14, 2021
A married couple live happily together. However, their family life soon ran into jeopardy when a dark, terrible secret of the husband came out of light. Cast: Vivian Sung, Wu Kang-ren
8	2	"The Day the Wind Blew"	Seiko Matsuda	Seiko Matsuda, Tan Fong-cheng, Tomoki Kanazawa	Japan	Japanese	November 21, 2021
A tale of a schoolgirl who meets the man of her dreams ― her idol. But something seems amiss and her fairy tale is destined for a hellish end. Cast: Win Morisaki, Haori Takahashi, Fuyuki Moto, Tae Kimura
9	3	"Broker of Death"	Sittisiri Mongkolsiri	Kongdej Jaturaneasmee	Thailand	Thai	November 28, 2021
A father owns an amulet shop in order for his daughter to pay his medical bills when she discovers to pick up a dead body. The corpse is to be a part of the ritual so that a wealthy politician can have more power. Cast: Natee Ngamnaewprom, Sornchai Chatwiritachai, Jennis Oprasert
10	4	"7 Days of Hell"	Erik Matti	Michiko Yamamoto	Philippines	Tagalog	December 5, 2021
A policewoman finds her son suddenly afflicted with a mysterious illness, but things may not be as it seems. Cast: Dolly de Leon
11	5	"Grandma's Kiss"	Billy Christian	Billy Christian, Wihamdy Oesman	Indonesia	Indonesian	December 12, 2021
After being abandoned by her daughter, an elderly woman spends her life in a local retirement home with a roommate. Little did the woman know that her roommate has been harboring a warmly yet devious plan, only to see her grandchildren again. Cast: Lydia Kandou, Ken Zuraida
12	6	"The Excursion"	Nicole Midori Woodford	Nicole Midori Woodford	Singapore	Mandarin; English	December 19, 2021
A troubled mother brings her son on an excursion to the beach after their family tragically unravels. At the edge of the sea, a horrifying truth awaits. Cast: Mindee Ong, Darren Lim, Ethan Ng Kai En
13	7	"Ayizah, Ayizah"	Bradley Liew	Bradley Liew & Dodo Dayao	Malaysia	Malay	September 16, 2022
After discovering her employer consults a supernatural being for success, a young housekeeper finds herself seduced by the creature's promise of power and wealth. Cast: Sara Ali, Remy Ishak, Sharifah Sakinah

== Production ==
=== Development ===
Episodes were directed by Khoo, Joko Anwar, Pen-Ek Ratanaruang, Takumi Saitoh, Lee Sang-woo and Ho Yuhang.

=== Casting ===
Kim You-jung was offered a role in the South Korean episode.

== Release ==
=== Season 1 ===
All six episodes of the series have received preview screenings at various film festivals in advance of the television premiere. Anwar's "A Mother's Love" and Ratanaruang's "Pob" received a preview screening at the 2018 Toronto International Film Festival as part of its Primetime stream of selected television projects. Another two episodes, Saitoh's "Tatami" and Khoo's "Nobody", received a preview screening at the 2018 Sitges Film Festival as part of Serial Sitges section, while Ho's "Toyol" and Lee's "Mongdal" were screened at the 2018 Fantastic Fest in Austin as part of Folklore program.

The Indonesian episode had its West Coast premiere on November 14, 2018 at 19th annual San Diego Asian Film Festival.

The extended version of the South Korean episode would have its world premiere at the 23rd annual Bucheon International Fantastic Film Festival as part of "Korean Fantastic: Crossover" section. However, it was canceled due to circumstances of the production company.

=== Season 2 ===
The two of six episodes of the season had world premiere at 2021 Tokyo International Film Festival as part of "TIFF Series". Woodford's "The Excursion" and Matsuda's "The Day the Wind Blew" were screened at Humantrust Cinema, Yūrakuchō on November 4, 2021.
