= Adult Supervision =

2026 Swedish dark comedy film

- Official poster
- Swedish: Arkipelag
- Directed by: Alex Schulman
- Screenplay by: Alex Schulman
- Produced by: Christina Legkova
- Starring: Gustaf Skarsgård; Fares Fares; Linus Wahlgren
- Cinematography: Jakob Ihre
- Edited by: Dino Jonsäter
- Music by: Wilhelm Börjesson; Oskar Rindborg
- Production companies: Warner Bros. International Television Production; RMV Film; Tiisch Film; Film Stockholm; Scanbox Entertrainment
- Distributed by: Scanbox Entertainment
- Release dates: 19 September 2026 (Fantastic Fest); 9 October 2026 (Sweden)
- Running time: 108 minutes
- Country: Sweden
- Language: Swedish

Adult Supervision (Swedish: Arkipelag) is a 2026 Swedish black comedy film written and directed by Alex Schulman in his feature directorial debut. It stars Gustaf Skarsgard, Fares Fares and Linus Wahlgren, as three fathers chaperoning their teenage daughters on a rowdy school trip to a remote island where tensions quickly escalate.

The film had its world premiere in the Next Wave Competition of the 21st Fantastic Fest on 19 September 2026. It is set to release on 9 October by Scanbox Entertainment in Swedish cinemas.

It was also selected as the Swedish entry for the Best International Feature Film at the 99th Academy Awards.

== Synopsis ==
The film combines comedy and dark humour to explore modern parenting, fatherhood, and masculinity.

Three fathers chaperone their teenage daughters on a rowdy school trip to a remote island. Tensions quickly escalate and their grip on the situation begins to slip. As buried memories resurface, games turn into power struggles - and power into violence. Soon no one can tell: who is in charge, and who is in danger?

== Cast ==
- Gustaf Skarsgård as Bill
- Fares Fares as Bobo
- Linus Wahlgren as Pontus
- Nonni Ardal Hammarström as Mark
- Baxter Renman as Ted
- Bruno Sauren as Pierre
- Olof Olingdahl
- Melker Pernfors Serngard

== Production ==
Principal photography began on 14 May 2025 in Stockholm Archipelago. Filming concluded on 3 July 2025 and post-production began on 8 July.

In January 2026, the Works in Progress project was selected in 27th Nordic Film Market run in conjunction with Göteborg Film Festival.

Heretic presented the film in Marché du Film at Cannes Film Festival in May 2026.

== Release ==
Adult Supervision will have its world premiere in Next Wave Competition of the Fantastic Fest on 19 September 2026. It will be screened in the Gala Premieres at Zurich Film Festival on 27 September 2026.

On 24 September it will be screened at the Reykjavik International Film Festival. Later, on 9 October 2026 Scanbox Entertainment will release it in Swedish cinemas.

In November, it will have its Spanish premiere at the 23rd Seville European Film Festival.

Athens-based international sales agent Heretic acquired international sales rights of the film in April 2026 before Marché du Film.

The film was distributed internationally by various companies, including Fandango in Italy, Palace Films in Australia and New Zealand, and Vertigo Releasing in Hungary. CinemArt will handle its release in the Czech Republic and Slovakia, MCF in the former Yugoslavia and Bulgaria, Mayfly in Poland, Inoekino in the Commonwealth of Independent States, and Taip Toliau in Lithuania, Estinfilm in Estonia and Riga FF in Latvia. Warner Bros. Discovery also acquired the broadcast rights for HBO Europe and streaming rights for HBO Max in several Central and Eastern European countries after the theatrical release.

== Accolades ==
Award	Date of ceremony	Category	Recipient	Result	Ref.
Fantastic Fest	24 September 2026	Best Picture	Adult Supervision	Won	
Seville European Film Festival	14 November 2026	'Puerta de América' Award	Adult Supervision	Won	
Seville European Film Festival	14 November 2026	Prize for Best Actor	Gustaf Skarsgård, Fares Fares, Linus Wahlgren	Won	

== See also ==
- List of submissions to the 99th Academy Awards for Best International Feature Film
- List of Swedish submissions for the Academy Award for Best International Feature Film
