= Bernard Launois =

French film director and actor (1930–2026)

Bernard Launois (French pronunciation: [bɛʁ.naʁ lonwa], 8 April 1930 – 3 March 2026) was a French exploitation film director, screenwriter and actor. As an actor, he sometimes used the pseudonym Bob Gary.

== Life and career ==
Launois was born in Mézières, France on 8 April 1930. Having studied pharmacology for two years in the university, he sought a career in the film industry instead. He worked as a trainee editor and then as an assistant director. In 1953, he was employed by Paramount's programming department in Paris.

During the 1960s, he worked for several film distribution and production companies, such as Parafrance and Les Films Copernic. In 1979, he founded his own company, Lancaster Film, to finance the films he wrote and directed. He also edited film trailers and played minor roles as an actor. His debut film as director, Lâchez les chiennes (lit. 'Unleash the Bitches', released in 1972), was an improvised work that he wrote in three days. Devil Story, his seventh and last feature film, has gained a cult following because of its reputation as one of the worst films in history. It was restored in 4K resolution from its 35mm original camera negative and released on Blu-ray by Vinegar Syndrome, an American home video distribution company, in 2021.

He founded Delta Films and bought a four-theatre multiplex in 1987. Launois retired from the filmmaking business at the end of the 1980s, and died on 3 March 2026, at the age of 95.

== Filmography ==
=== Director ===
- 1972: Lâchez les chiennes
- 1975: Les Dépravées du plaisir or Le Gibier
- 1976: Les Machines à sous
- 1976: La Grande Suédoise or Partouzes franco-suédoises
- 1980: Sacrés Gendarmes
- 1980: Touch' pas à mon biniou or Gueules de vacances
- 1985: Devil Story or Il était une fois... le diable

=== Producer ===
- 1976: Les Machines à sous
- 1980: Touch' pas à mon biniou or Gueules de vacances

=== Actor ===
- 1970: Le Voyageur by Daniel Daert
- 1971: Une Femme libre de Claude Pierson
- 1971: Chaleurs or La femme créa l'amant by Daniel Daert
- 1971: Caroline mannequin nu by Daniel Lesueur
- 1971: Deux mâles pour Alexa (Fieras sin jaula) by Juan Logar
- 1973: Pigalle carrefour des illusions by Pierre Chevalier
- 1973: Les Infidèles (1973 film) by Christian Lara
- 1980: Touch' pas à mon biniou or Gueules de vacances
- 1985: Devil Story or Il était une fois... le diable
