= Dinosaur from the Deep =

- Directed by: Norbert Moutier
- Produced by: Norbert Moutier
- Starring: Jean Rollin; Tina Aumont; Sylvaine Charlet; Guy Godefroy; Norbert Moutier; Tina Aumont; Christophe Bier
- Edited by: N.G. Mount
- Music by: Sylvaine Charlet
- Distributed by: N.M. International
- Release date: 1993
- Running time: 77 minutes
- Country: France
- Language: French

Dinosaur from the Deep is a 1993 French horror science-fiction B movie by filmmaker Norbert Moutier and starring Jean Rollin, Tina Aumont and Sylvaine Charlet.

== Plot ==
After the death penalty has been abolished in 2004, and not knowing how to deal with an abominable criminal recidivist, the FBI's experts and lawyers decide to send the condemned on a journey through time to a time when the sentence still applied. For financial reasons, this expedition is coupled with a scientific mission charged with tracing the first dinosaurs. They find they did exist, and the crew is in pursuit of the prisoner now at large.

== Production ==
The film was likely produced to capitalize on the success of Steven Spielberg's Jurassic Park. It was filmed on a low budget, with the dinosaurs being made of clay and papier-mâché. In some scenes, the animals “come to life” using stop-motion animation; even a toy dinosaur is used for some shots with this technique. Bois de Vincennes, Paris, and Philadelphia were used as filming locations.

== Cast ==
- Jean Rollin as Professeur Harry Nolan
- Tina Aumont as Nora
- Sylvaine Charlet as Peggy Nolan
- Guy Godefroy as Calvin
- Norbert Moutier (as Bert Goldman) as Kruger
- Quelou Parente as Cave Girl
- Christophe Bier as Lawyer
- Cécile Letargat as Nurse
- Gérard Stum as Avocado Man
- Christian Letargat as Photographer

== Release ==
The film was not released theatrically in France, but only in VHS in 1994.

== Reception ==
This movie has a current grade of 3.6/10 on IMDb based on 67 ratings.

== See also ==
- List of films featuring dinosaurs
