= Norbert Moutier =

French publisher (1941–2020)

- Born: 17 March 1941; Antony, Hauts-de-Seine, France
- Died: 27 January 2020 (aged 78); Orléans, France
- Occupations: Actor; Director
- Years active: 1982–2012

Norbert Moutier

Norbert George Moutier (17 March 1941 – 27 January 2020), also known by the pseudonym N.G. Mount, was a French publisher, writer, director, and actor.

A professional filmmaker, Moutier had a passion for Z movies, similar to those of Jean Rollin and William Lustig.

== Biography ==
Although he was fascinated by film at a young age, Moutier studied law. During his time as an accountant, he maintained his passion for film and comics while leading a film club and contributing to two fanzines, titled Monster Bis and Le Petit bédéraste du 20e siècle. Monster Bis has been gaining notoriety among fans of Z movies.

Moutier began shooting films in 1982. He worked as the director, screenwriter, producer, and sometimes as an actor in his movies. The majority of his films were low-budget and rather amateur. These films were self-published on VHS tapes with a limited distribution. Actors such as Jean-Pierre Putters, Jean Rollin, Quélou Parente, Christophe Bier, Christophe Lemaire, and Christian Letargat acted in some of his films, and were occasionally cameos for main roles.

Moutier officially stopped working as an accountant in 1986 and opened up a comic book shop in Paris, called "BD - Ciné". He wrote in the magazine Fantasyka and made other contributions until 2002.

During the 2000s decade, Moutier transformed his comic shop into a bookstore specializing in rare films, comics, and souvenirs linked to cinematography. He continued to publish new editions of Monster Bis. He retired in 2012 and moved to Orléans.

Norbert Moutier died on 27 January 2020 at the age of 79.

== Filmography ==
- Ogroff a.k.a. Mad Mutilator (1983)
- Hemophilia (1985)
- Opération Las Vegas (1988)
- Trepanator (1991)
- Alien Platoon (1992)
- Dinosaur from the Deep (1994)
- Le Syndrome d'Edgar Poe (1995)
- Death Camp (unfinished) (1997)
- Brooklyn Cop (1999)
