= Norway (2014 film) =

Greek black comedy horror film

- Theatrical release poster
- Directed by: Yannis Veslemes
- Written by: Yannis Veslemes
- Produced by: Yorgos Tsourgiannis; Christos V. Konstantakopoulos
- Starring: Vangelis Mourikis; Alexia Kaltsiki; Daniel Bolda
- Cinematography: Christos Karamanis
- Edited by: Yannis Chalkiadakis
- Music by: Felizol
- Production company: Horsefly Productions
- Release date: 7 July 2014 (KVIFF)
- Running time: 73 minutes
- Country: Greece

Norway (Greek: Νορβηγία) is a 2014 Greek black comedy horror film written and directed by Yannis Veslemes, who also composed its score under the alias Felizol. Set in 1984, the film stars Vangelis Mourikis as a hedonistic vampire named Zano, who arrives in Athens and becomes involved in an elaborate plot with a couple he meets at a disco club.

Norway premiered at the Karlovy Vary International Film Festival in the Czech Republic on 7 July 2014.

== Production ==
=== Development ===
Writer-director Yannis Veslemes described the character of Zano as "A vampire that combines everything I love and hate about New Greeks." The film derives its title from the 1984 song "Norway" by the Greek band Without a Necklace.

=== Filming ===
Filming took place in the summer of 2012.

== Reception ==
Stephen Dalton of The Hollywood Reporter called Norway "a feverish exercise in heavily stylized weirdness", noting Veslemes's "bold ideas and stylistic verve" but writing that the film "suffers from a rambling plot and too many digressions into surreal whimsy that undermine the main narrative."

In 2023, Matt Donato of IGN ranked Norway number 19 on his list of the 25 best vampire movies of all time, writing, "I promise you will never see a groovier, more fleet-of-foot vampire hallucination than Norway".
