= Ogroff =

1983 film by N. G. Mount

- Promotional poster
- Directed by: N. G. Mount
- Written by: N. G. Mount
- Starring: N. G. Mount; Howard Vernon; Françoise Deniel; Pierre Pattin
- Cinematography: Marc Georges
- Edited by: Philippe Brossard
- Music by: Jean Richard
- Release date: 1983
- Running time: 90 minutes
- Country: France
- Language: French

Ogroff, also known as Mad Mutilator, is a 1983 French zombie horror slasher film written, directed by, and starring Norbert Moutier (as N. G. Mount) and Howard Vernon. Its plot follows an isolated backwoods lumberjack who attacks and murders people passing through his woods.

== Cast ==
- Norbert Moutier as Ogroff
- Robert Alaux
- Françoise Deniel
- Pierre Pattin
- Alain Petit as Lumberjack
- Howard Vernon as Vampire

== Production ==
The film was shot on Super 8 film in Orléans, France. The film's director, writer, and lead actor, Norbert Moutier (credited as N. G. Mount), was a video rental store proprietor who devised the film with the hopes of renting it to patrons at his store.

=== Score ===
In 2018, Jean Richard's complete musical score was released digitally by Specific Recordings on vinyl and digitally via Bandcamp.

== Release ==
=== Critical response ===
Joseph A. Ziemba, published in The New York Times, described the film as a "gore-drenched... European pastiche of American slashers." Promoting a revival screening, the Alamo Drafthouse wrote of the film in a press release: "Director N.G. Mount’s kinetic stylings rip-off any number of early 80s slashers -- and trumps them all. Mount’s madness on all visual, technical, and constitutional levels achieves an iconic trash perfection that is only equalled by fellow idiosyncratic filmmakers Nick Millard, Doris Wishman, and Chester Turner."

=== Home media ===
The film had its DVD premiere on December 4, 2012. In October 2026, the film was remastered and released on Blu-ray for the first time.

== See also ==
- Violent Shit
- The Corpse Eaters, a horror film created by a theater proprietor for the sole purpose of distribution in that particular venue
