= Body Temperature (film) =

- Directed by: Takaomi Ogata
- Starring: Chavetaro Ishizaki; Rin Sakuragi
- Release date: September 23, 2011 (Fantastic Fest)
- Running time: 72 minutes
- Country: Japan
- Language: Japanese

Body Temperature (体温) is a 2010 Japanese romantic drama film directed by Takaomi Ogata.

== Cast ==
- Chavetaro Ishizaki
- Rin Sakuragi
