= Greatful Dead (film) =

- Film poster
- Japanese: Gureitofuru deddo
- Directed by: Eiji Uchida
- Written by: Eiji Uchida; Etsuo Hiratani
- Produced by: Hôka Kinoshita; Tomoharu Kusunoki
- Starring: Aira; Itsuji Itao; Yoichiro Kawakami; Kkobbi Kim; Hôka Kinoshita
- Cinematography: Shinya Kimura
- Production company: Ark Entertainment
- Distributed by: Ark Entertainment
- Release dates: September 19, 2013 (Austin Fantastic Fest); January 26, 2015 (United Kingdom)
- Running time: 97 minutes
- Country: Japan
- Language: Japanese

Greatful Dead (a.k.a. Gureitofuru Deddo) is a 2013 Japanese horror film directed by Uchida Eiji. The film featured in the London Raindance Film Festival

== Plot ==
Nami, a 20-year-old Japanese woman (played by Takiuchi Kumi), inherits a small fortune. Largely abandoned by her parents as a child, She spends her time idly spending her money, ordering new appliances and buying clothes. However, getting bored of this, she starts to develop a range of abnormal activities. Nami herself, despite being independently wealthy, is lonely and lives an isolated existence. She starts to develop the habit of observing people, and in voyeuristic fashion, she starts to observe other people in a similarly isolated (and sometimes crazed) state. She calls these people "Solitarians". In particular, she focuses on elderly and vulnerable people and in particular, men. From her apartment in the city, with powerful binoculars, she observes these men, and sometimes watches them descend into madness and death, even taking selfies with their dead bodies. She delights in their misery, and soon her peeping Tom like behavior. However, one of her observed targets, an old man (Takashi Sasano) instead of descending into madness and death as she expected, is saved by Christian volunteers and has his life turned around. This sends her into a murderous rage, pitting old against the young.

== Cast ==
- Kumi Takiuchi
- Itsuji Itao
- Aira
- Yoichiro Kawakami
- Kkobbi Kim
