= Lie Still =

- First edition (US)
- Author: Julia Heaberlin
- Language: English
- Publication date: 2013

Lie Still is a 2013 novel by Julia Heaberlin, published by Bantam Books in the US and Faber & Faber in the UK

ISBN 978-0-571-29902-7
