= Firefly (2005 film) =

- Directed by: Pete Marcy
- Written by: Chris Marcy; Peter Marcy
- Produced by: Adam Anderson; Chris Marcy; Joe Marcy; Peter Marcy
- Starring: Lindsay Hinman; Chris Marcy; Devon Jorlett; Pete Marcy; Sara Persons; Andy Reeves; Joe Marcy; Willie Davis; Adam Anderson
- Cinematography: Peter Marcy
- Edited by: Peter Marcy
- Music by: Peter Marcy; Adam Anderson
- Production company: Failureboys
- Release date: June 11, 2005
- Running time: 104 minutes
- Country: United States
- Language: English

Firefly is an independent film directed by Pete Marcy and produced by Failure Boys, a small production company based in Minneapolis, Minnesota. It was shot in Minnesota and Wisconsin with a $6,000 budget and released in June 2005.

== Plot outline ==
Del (Chris Marcy) woke up in his truck, hung-over and covered with dirt. Brandt (Pete Marcy) was found floating in a river. Susan (Lindsay Hinman) was rushed to the hospital, bloody and cold. Bad things happened on Halloween night. Now, a week before Christmas, Del is having nightmares, Brandt is losing confidence in his relationship, and Susan's memory of her assault is met with pity and doubt. There is also a strange bald man, whose unexplained clairvoyance leads him to those in need. The answers will come on Christmas Eve.

== Cast ==
- Lindsay Marcy as Susan (as Lindsay Hinman)
- Peter Marcy as Brandt
- Chris Marcy as Del
- Devon Jorlett as Arnie
- Sara Persons as Rachel
- Joe Marcy as Joe
- Adam Anderson as Scott
- Brent Augustinack as Ear Bandage
- Andy Reeves as Casey
- Will Davis as Will
- Skip Reeves as Otto Maki
- Delta Shelby as Nicki
- Josh Hodney as Barry
- David Greene as Greenbriar Resident

== Film festivals ==
- 2005
  - CineVegas Film Festival (Las Vegas, World Premiere)
- 2006
  - Bluegrass Film Festival (Kentucky)
  - Kansas International Film Festival (Kansas City)
  - Sidewalk Moving Picture Festival (Birmingham)
  - Fantastic Fest (Austin)
  - Shriekfest (L.A.)
  - International Horror and Sci-Fi Film Festival (Phoenix)
- 2007
  - Amsterdam Fantastic Film Festival (Amsterdam, International Premiere)
  - Minneapolis-Saint Paul International Film Festival (Minneapolis)

== Awards ==
- "Audience Award" (third place), Fantastic Fest
- "Best Writing", Bluegrass Film Festival
- "Best Sci-Fi Feature", International Horror and Sci-Fi Film Festival
- "Best Director", International Horror and Sci-Fi Film Festival

== Origin and alternative drafts ==
Firefly was co-written and directed by Pete Marcy. Originally conceived in 2000, Firefly was written backwards, with the ending giving way to the intricate build-up preceding it; once the skeleton of the story was in place, Marcy's brother Chris joined him in writing the rest of the script, filling out dialogue and characters. Originally, the ending was to take place in a warehouse, with a struggle over a knife and a fatal gunshot, but Pete and Chris, along with the rest of the crew, thought that was "stupid".

Firefly began filming in November 2002 and finished post-production in June 2005, running 115 minutes. An alternative, final cut was finished in Spring 2006, running 104 minutes. Among the scenes cut out was one with the director's mother.

== Reviews ==
The film was reviewed in Las Vegas Weekly, Popmatters, Dread Central, and by Eric D. Snider.
