= Devil Story =

1986 film

- Theatrical release poster
- French: Il était une fois... le diable
- Directed by: Bernard Launois
- Written by: Bernard Launois
- Starring: Véronique Renaud; Marcel Portier; Pascal Simon; Nicole Desailly
- Cinematography: Guy Maria
- Edited by: Raymonde Battini
- Music by: Paul Piot; Michel Roy
- Production companies: Films Albatros; Condor Films
- Release date: 26 November 1986 (France)
- Running time: 75 minutes
- Country: France
- Language: French

Devil Story (French: Il était une fois... le diable, lit. 'Once upon a time... the devil'), is a 1986 French Nazisploitation horror film written and directed by Bernard Launois. It is his seventh and last feature film. An uneven mixture of the slasher and Euro-gothic genres, it was largely panned by critics for its incoherent script and technical incompetence. It has since gained a cult following because of its reputation as one of the worst films in history.

== Plot ==
A seemingly deranged murderer in a Schutzstaffel uniform with a disfigured spine and pig-like face terrorises a rural area of Normandy and slaughters whomever he encounters at random—first a couple of campers, then a man asking for directions to the nearest gas station.

A couple's car breaks down on the road, and they decide to stay at a nearby hotel until they can repair their car. The hotel is a modified old castle run by an elderly man and woman. The younger couple learn from their hosts that the place is cursed.

== Reception ==
After initially released in 1986 in only a small number of theatres in French provinces, the film was shown in Paris as a double feature at Le Brady, under the title Il était une fois... le diable.

In Spinegrinder: The Movies Most Critics Won't Write About, author and critic Clive Davies described the film as "75 mins [sic] of near-catatonic nonsense" with "a dumb, circular ending". Scott Aaron Stine wrote in his The Gorehound's Guide to Splatter Films of the 1980s: "Despite the charming contrivances, [Devil Story] is just one more reason why French cinema rarely ventures or strays into splatter territory". Lexikon des internationalen Films, a German-language reference work on all theatrical films and many television films released in Germany since 1945, noted the film's homages to John Carpenter's 1980 film The Fog.

== Home media ==
The film was released on VHS by a French company called American Vidéo in the late 1980s.

The film was restored in 4K resolution from its 35mm original camera negative and released on Blu-ray by Vinegar Syndrome, an American home video distribution company, in 2021. This restored version was screened at the Fantastic Fest, an annual film festival in Austin, Texas, US, in September 2021.
