= The Horribly Slow Murderer with the Extremely Inefficient Weapon =

2008 short film by Richard Gale

- Directed by: Richard Gale
- Written by: Richard Gale
- Produced by: Richard Gale
- Starring: Paul Clemens; Brian Rohan; Melissa Paladino; Mike Kacey; Fay Kato
- Cinematography: Richard Gale
- Music by: Christopher Brady
- Release date: September 18, 2008
- Running time: 10 minutes
- Country: United States
- Language: English
- Budget: $600

The Horribly Slow Murderer with the Extremely Inefficient Weapon is a 10-minute short film released in 2008. It was filmed entirely in California over the course of 22 days. It was written, directed, and narrated by Richard Gale.

The film won the Special Jury Prize at the Fantastic Fest, the Best Short Film award at the Fantasia International Film Festival, and the Citizen's Choice Award and the Grand Prize for Short Film at the Puchon International Fantastic Film Festival, and was named the Best Short Film of 2009 by Rue Morgue.

It was shot on a budget of $600 on a Panasonic HVX200 digital video camera with special effects created in Adobe After Effects and edited on Final Cut Pro. It was not stated if the budget included equipment, software costs, or salaries for the 30-day shoot.

== Plot ==
The short film is presented as a teaser trailer for a 9-hour-long movie. It opens with a voice-over telling the viewer that: "some murders take seconds; some murders take minutes; some murders take hours; this murder... will take years!".

The short film portrays the story of a forensic pathologist called Jack Cucchiaio (played by Paul Clemens; "cucchiaio" means spoon in Italian), who finds himself being haunted by a deranged-looking man (Brian Rohan), who is, without any apparent reason, hitting him with a spoon. No one seems to believe Jack, as the mysterious attacker only shows up when he is alone. Jack is seen developing a phobia of spoons, stirring his coffee with a fork.

As Jack continues to be hit with a spoon, he attempts to defend himself by stabbing his attacker in the throat with a kitchen knife. The deranged-looking man turns out to be immortal and pulls out the knife and throws it away. The man resumes hitting Jack with the spoon. During the attack, Jack notices a strange symbol on his attacker's arm.

To find out more about his attacker, Jack travels to East Asia. He learns that his attacker is known as the Ginosaji ("silver spoon" in Japanese), an immortal and unstoppable being. It searches for a victim to terrorize and slowly kill by repeatedly hitting them with a spoon. The Ginosaji will follow Jack to the ends of the Earth and will not stop attacking Jack until he dies.

Jack is shown traveling around the world, sometimes trying to escape from the Ginosaji and other times to fight it. He uses various weapons, including dynamite, firearms, and a rocket-propelled grenade. Since the Ginosaji is immortal, it survives Jack's attempts and continues haunting him.

The last scene shows a weakened, wounded Jack crawling in the desert with the Ginosaji striking him with the spoon. The spoon suddenly breaks. The Ginosaji opens its jacket and shows dozens of spoons.

Finally, the title and credits are shown in typical trailer style.

== Sequels ==
=== Spoon vs. Spoon ===
A sequel, Spoon vs. Spoon, was later released on YouTube, where Jack takes on the advice of a viewer to fight back with another spoon. This, however, backfires as the Ginosaji takes Jack's other spoon and hits him with both spoons. The Ginosaji has since dual-wielded the spoons.

=== Save Jack ===
Another sequel, Save Jack, was also released as a game. The player has several choices on what Jack Cucchiaio should do, such as wearing protective clothing, using a giant magnet, hugging the Ginosaji, or kicking it in the crotch. All of the choices backfire, making the situation more difficult. The only choice close to succeeding is using a magnet; however, the Ginosaji used a wooden spoon in that situation.

=== Spoon Wars ===
A third sequel, Spoon Wars, features a duel between Jack (dressed as a Jedi Knight from Star Wars, armed with a blue lightsaber) and the Ginosaji (resembling a Sith Lord from Star Wars, armed with a spoon). Jack is killed, and the duel comes to an end. Jack wakes up and realizes the duel was a dream. At first, Jack also believes that he had dreamt up the Ginosaji, but this is disproven as the Ginosaji attacks him again.

=== Ginosaji vs. Ginosaji ===
A fourth sequel, Ginosaji vs. Ginosaji, is a four-part mini-series. It features Jack disguised as another Ginosaji, attempting to convince the Ginosaji not to attack him. Wearing make-up and a hoodie, Jack attacks another person with a spoon, but the person hits Jack instead. The Ginosaji is not convinced of Jack's disguise.

An injured Jack attempts suicide by jumping in front of a bus. His attempt fails, and he is dragged by the bus. After Jack manages to detach himself from the bus, an old woman tries to kill him with her cane in the same manner as the Ginosaji with its spoon. Jack is simultaneously attacked by the Ginosaji. Jack is knocked out as a passer-by tries to keep the old woman at bay. While knocked out, Jack finds himself in his "happy place", where he meets the "happy squirrel", who tries to motivate Jack.

After a year of recovering, Jack disguises himself as a Ginosaji again, this time more convincingly. Another duel with the Ginosaji takes place in the Gobi Desert. Jack loses the duel and tries to kill the happy squirrel. Angry at Jack's betrayal, the happy squirrel urinates on Jack's face and runs off.

At the end of Ginosaji vs. Ginosaji, Richard Gale announces that there will be a full-length film of Jack and the Ginosaji's story, titled GINOSAJI – The Horribly Slow Murderer With The Extremely Inefficient Weapon.

== Feature film ==
Richard Gale confirmed he would write and direct a feature film based on his original short film.

On September 10, 2015, a 55-day crowdfunding campaign on Kickstarter was launched by Gale to help fund a feature-length motion picture. The campaign was canceled prior to completion, having raised over $100,000 in pledges. Gale launched a second campaign with a goal of $50,000 instead, stating that he would receive partial funding from private investors but needed the additional crowd-sourced funds to produce the movie.
