= Aatank =

1996 Bollywood action thriller

- Directed by: Prem Lalwani; Desh Mukherjee
- Written by: Sachin Bhowmick
- Produced by: Prem Lalwani
- Starring: Dharmendra; Hema Malini; Vinod Mehra
- Music by: Laxmikant–Pyarelal
- Release date: 9 February 1996
- Running time: 113 minutes
- Country: India
- Language: Hindi

Aatank (English: Terror) is a 1996 Indian action thriller film written by Sachin Bhowmick and directed by Prem Lalwani and Desh Mukherjee. The film stars Dharmendra, Hema Malini, Vinod Mehra, Ravi Kishen in the lead roles. The film began principal photography in the mid-1980s and was delayed for several years before being released in 1996. A sub-plot with a killer shark may have been inspired by the 1975 American film Jaws.

== Plot ==
Jesu and Peter are childhood friends who live in a coastal village in India and depend on fishing as their livelihood. The community is oppressed by a powerful gangster named Alphonso. Jesu is an orphan, while Peter is brought up by his aunt and uncle, after the death of his mother. The community is all thrilled when Phillip finds black pearls off the coast.

But then so does Alphonso, who asks his divers to get all the pearls, thus disturbing the ocean. Peter meets with Suzy D'Silva and they fall in love with each other and get married. While enjoying a quiet swim on the seashore, Suzy disappears. A search is carried out, and several human body parts are recovered. With shock and horror, this community finds that a gigantic man-eating shark is threatening their livelihood.

== Cast ==
- Dharmendra as Jesu
- Hema Malini as Jesu's Girlfriend
- Vinod Mehra as Peter
- Nafisa Ali as Suzy D' Silva
- Girish Karnad as Inspector Khan
- Ravi Kishen as CBI Officer Mahesh Kumar
- Padma Khanna as Rosy Crasto
- Ranjeet as Ranjeet
- Kader Khan as D'Costa
- Amjad Khan as Alphonso
- Leela Mishra
- Padma Khanna
- Shamsher Singh
- Disco Shanti as Dancer
- Keshto Mukherjee as Phillip

== Soundtrack ==
The lyrics were written by Dev Kohli and Rani Malik.

Song	Singer
"Main Door Chali"	Asha Bhosle
"Meri Jawani"	Asha Bhosle
"Kya Raat Hai"	Jolly Mukherjee and Asha Bhosle
"Main Chhui Mui"	Jolly Mukherjee and Ila Arun
"Meri Patli Kamar"	Alka Yagnik and Ila Arun
