= Underwater Love (film) =

2011 Japanese film by Shinji Imaoka

- Directed by: Shinji Imaoka
- Written by: Shinji Imaoka; Fumio Moriya
- Produced by: Stephan Holl; Daisuke Asakura
- Starring: Sawa Masaki; Yoshiro Umezawa; Ai Narita
- Cinematography: Christopher Doyle
- Music by: Stereo Total
- Production companies: Kokuei Company; Rapid Eye Movies HE GmbH
- Distributed by: Films Boutique
- Release date: April 22, 2011 (Tribeca Film Festival)
- Running time: 87 minutes
- Countries: Japan; Germany
- Language: Japanese

Underwater Love (UNDERWATER LOVE-おんなの河童-, UNDERWATER LOVE Onna no kappa) is a 2011 pink film musical about a woman and a sea creature. It is a co-production between Germany's Rapid Eye Movies and Japan's Kokuei Company. It was directed by Shinji Imaoka (who had earlier directed the pink films Lunch Box and Frog Song), shot by cinematographer Christopher Doyle and includes music by French-German band Stereo Total. Underwater Love was shot in 5 ½ days, one take only.

== Plot ==
Asuka, a woman in her thirties, works in a lakeside fish factory. She's about to be married to her boss, Taki. But one day, she encounters a kappa – a water sprite found in Japanese folklore – and learns that the creature is in fact the reborn form of Aoki, an old crush who'd drowned to death when they were 17.

== Cast ==
- Sawa Masaki (正木佐和) as Asuka Kawaguchi
- Yoshiro Umezawa (梅澤嘉朗) as Tetsuya Aoki
- Ai Narita (成田愛) as Reiko Shima
- Mutsuo Yoshioka (吉岡睦雄) as Hajime Taki
- Fumio Moriya (守屋文雄)
- Hiroshi Satō (佐藤宏)

== See also ==
- The Shape of Water
