= List of Boston Underground Film Festival screenings =

Breakdown of BUFF editions by year, with premieres, awards and nominees. Currently including 2017–2026. All screenings were held at the Brattle Theater in Cambridge.

[Missing information from 1998 to 2016]

== 2017 ==
The 2017 festival took place from March 22 to March 26.

=== New England premieres ===
- Fraud (Dean Fleischer-Camp, US, 2016)
- She's Allergic to Cats (Michael Reich, US, 2016)
- The Void (Jeremy Gillespie and Steven Kostanski, US, 2016)

=== East Coast premieres ===
- A Dark Song (Deborah Haywood, Ireland, 2016)
- A Life in Waves (Brett Whitcomb, US, 2017) – Directors Brett Whitcomb and Bradford Thomason in attendance
- Bitch (Marianna Palka, US, 2017)
- Hidden Reserves (Valentin Hitz, Austria/Germany/Switzerland, 2016)
- Neighborhood Food Drive (Jerzy Rose, US, 2017) – Director Jerzy Rose and writer Halle Butler in attendance

=== Repertory Screenings ===
- Southland Tales (Richard Kelly, US, 2006)

== 2018 ==
The 2018 festival took place from March 21 to March 25.

=== World premieres ===
- Something Wicked This Way Comes (Jessica Barnthouse and Stacy Buchanan, US, 2018) – Directors Jessica Barnthouse and Stacy Buchanan in attendance
- The Queen of Hollywood Blvd (Orson Oblowitz, US, 2018) – Director Orson Oblowitz and actress Rosemary Hochschild in attendance

=== New England premieres ===
- Let the Corpses Tan (Hélène Cattet and Bruno Forzani, Belgium/France, 2017)
- Pin Cushion (Deborah Haywood, UK, 2017)
- The Theta Girl (Christopher Bickel, UK, 2017) – Screenwriter David Axe in attendance
- Tigers Are Not Afraid (Issa Lopez, Mexico, 2017) – Director Issa Lopez in attendance

=== East Coast premieres ===
- Good Manners (Juliana Rojas and Marco Dutra, Brazil/France, 2017)
- MexMan (Josh Polon, US, 2018) – Director Josh Polon in attendance
- My Name is Myeisha (Gus Krieger, US, 2018) – Director Gus Krieger and actor Rhaechyl Walker in attendance
- The Ranger (Jenn Wexler, US, 2018) – Director Jenn Wexler in attendance
- Revenge (Coralie Fargeat, France, 2018)

=== United States premieres ===
- Daha (Onur Saylak, Turkey, 2017)

=== Repertory screenings ===
- Liquid Sky (Slava Tsukerman, US, 1982) – 35th anniversary, 35mm Print

=== Other screenings ===
- Spoor (Agnieszka Holland, Poland, 2017)
- Top Knot Detective (Aaron McCann and Dominic Pearce, Australia, 2017)

== 2019 ==
The 2019 festival took place from March 20 to March 24.

=== New England premieres ===
- Werewolf (Adrian Panek, Poland, 2018)
- Knife+Heart (Yann Gonzalez, France, 2018)

=== East Coast premieres ===
- Girl on the Third Floor (Travis Stevens, US, 2019) – Director Travis Stevens in attendance
- Happy Face (Alexandre Franchi, Canada, 2018) – Director Alexandre Franchi in attendance
- Mope (Lucas Heyne, US, 2018) – Director Lucas Heyne in attendance
- Tone-Deaf (Richard Bates Jr., US, 2019)

=== United States premieres ===
- Assassinaut (Drew Bolduc, US, 2019) – Director Drew Bolduc in attendance

=== Massachusetts premieres ===
- Canary (Christiaan Olwagen, South Africa, 2018)
- Clickbait (Michael J. Epstein and Sophia Cacciola, US, 2018) – Directors Michael J. Epstein and Sophia Cacciola in attendance

=== Boston premieres ===
- Industrial Accident: The Story of Wax Trax! Records (Julia Nash, US, 2018)

=== Repertory screenings ===
- Mary Jane's Not a Virgin Anymore (Sarah Jacobson, US, 1997) – 2K Restoration

=== Other screenings ===
- Hail Satan? (Penny Lane, US, 2018) – Director Penny Lane and actor Lucien Greaves in attendance
- The Nightshifter (Dennison Ramalgo, Brazil, 2018)
- The Unthinkable (Crazy Pictures, Sweden, 2018)

== 2019 – BUFF-o-WEEN ==
The BUFF-o-WEEN was an extension of the 2019 festival which took place from October 17 to October 20.

=== New England premieres ===
- Blood & Flesh: The Reel Life and Ghastly Death of Al Adamson (David Gregory, US, 2019) – Director David Gregory in attendance
- Extra Ordinary (Enda Loughman and Mike Ahern, Ireland, 2019)
- The Golden Glove (Fatih Akin, Germany/France, 2019)
- Tammy and the T-Rex (Stewart Raffill, US, 1994) – New England premiere of 4K Restoration

=== East Coast premieres ===
- Blood on Her Name (Matthew Pope, US, 2019)

=== Boston premieres ===
- Daniel Isn't Real (Adam Egypt Mortimer, US, 2019)

== 2020 ==
The 2020 festival took place from March 25 to March 29.

=== World premieres ===
- It Cuts Deep (Nicholas Payne Santos, US, 2020) – Director Nicholas Payne Santos in attendance
- The Passion of Darkly Noon (Philip Ridley, UK/Germany/Belgium, 1995) – 2K Restoration

=== New England premieres ===
- It Comes (Tetsuya Nakashima, Japan, 2018)
- Jesus Shows You the Way to the Highway (Miguel Llansó, Spain /Estonia/Ethiopia/Latvia/Romania, 2019)

=== East Coast premieres ===
- The Deeper You Dig (John Adams and Toby Poser, US, 2019)
- Dinner in America (Adam Rehmeier, US, 2020)
- Jumbo (Zoe Wittock, France, 2020)
- Lucky (Natasha Kermani, Brazil/France, 2020) – Director Natasha Kermani in attendance

=== Boston premieres ===
- Deerskin (Quentin Dupiex, France, 2019)
- Holy Trinity (Molly Hewitt, US, 2019) – Director Molly Hewitt in attendance
- Saint Maud (Rose Glass, UK, 2019) – Director Rose Glass in attendance

=== International premieres ===
- Shark Week (Bri Poke, US, 2020) – Director Bri Poke in attendance

=== Repertory screenings ===
- The Witches (Nicolas Roeg, UK, 1990) – 30th anniversary

=== Other screenings ===
- Films in the Living Room (David Kleiler Jr., US, 2020) – Director David Kleiler Jr. in attendance

== 2021 ==
Boston Underground Film Festival participated in the Nightstream event due to the COVID-19 pandemic.

== 2022 ==
The 2022 festival took place from March 23 to March 27.

=== New England premieres ===
- Freakscene: The Story of Dinosaur Jr. (Philipp Reichenheim, US/Germany, 2021)
- Hatching (Hanna Bergholm, Finland, 2022)
- The Innocents (Eskil Vogt, Norway, 2021)
- Lux Æterna (Gaspar Noe, France, 2019)
- Medusa (Anita Rocha da Silveira, Brazil, 2021)
- Neptune Frost (Saul Williams and Anisia Uzeyman, US/Rwanda, 2021)
- Vortex (Gaspar Noe, France/Belgium, 2021)
- You Won't Be Alone (Goran Stolevski, Australia/UK/Serbia, 2022)

=== East Coast premieres ===
- Honeycomb (Avalon Fast, Canada, 2022) – Director Avalon Fast in attendance
- Hypochondriac (Addison Heiman, US, 2022)
- The Next (Terrence H. Winkless, US, 1987) – Premiere of Restoration
- Nitram (Justin Kurzel, Australia, 2021)
- Watcher (Chloe Okuno, US, 2022)

=== Repertory screenings ===
- The Secret of NIMH (Don Bluth, US, 1982) – 40th anniversary

== 2023 ==
The 2023 festival took place from March 22 to March 26.

=== World premieres ===
- The Unheard (Jeffrey A. Brown, US, 2023) – Director Jeffrey A. Brown, & screenwriters Michael and Shawn Rasmussen in attendance

=== New England premieres ===
- Enys Men (Mark Jenkin, UK, 2022)
- How to Blow Up a Pipeline (Daniel Goldhaber, US, 2022)
- Mister Organ (David Farrier, New Zealand, 2022)
- Piaffe (Ann Oren, Germany, 2022)
- Rebel (Adil El Arbi and Bilall Fallah, Belgium, 2022)
- Sick of Myself (Kristoffer Borgli, Norway/Sweden, 2022)
- Smoking Causes Coughing (Quentin Dupiex, UK, 2022)
- Stand By for Failure: A Documentary About Negativland (Ryan Worsley, US, 2022)

=== East Coast premieres ===
- The Angry Black Girl and Her Monster (Bomani J. Story, US, 2022)
- Divinity (Eddie Alcazar, US, 2023)
- Nightsiren (Tereza Nvotova, Slovakia, 2022)
- Spaghetti Junction (Kirby McClure, US, 2022) – Director Kirby McClure in attendance

=== Massachusetts premieres ===
- Moon Garden (Ryan Stevens Harris, US, 2022)

== 2024 ==
The 2024 festival took place from March 20 to March 24.

=== World premieres ===
- Strange Kindness (Joseph Mault, US, 2024) – Director Joseph Mault in attendance

=== New England premieres ===
- The Becomers (Zach Clark, US, 2023) – Director Zach Clark in attendance
- Femme (Sam H. Freeman and Ng Choon Ping, UK, 2023)
- Humanist Vampire Seeking Consenting Suicidal Person (Ariane Lous-Seize, Canada, 2023)
- Infested (Sébastien Vaniček, France, 2023)
- Omen (Baloji, DRC, 2023)
- Sleep (Jason Yu, South Korea, 2023)
- With Love and a Major Organ (Kim Albright, Canada, 2023)

=== East Coast premieres ===
- Immaculate (Michael Mohan, US, 2024)
- In a Violent Nature (Chris Nash, Canada, 2024) – Director Chris Nash in attendance
- Off Ramp (Nathan Tape, US, 2023) – Director Nathan Tape in attendance

=== North American premieres ===
- Fatal Termination (Andrew Kam, Hong Kong, 1990) – Premiere of Restoration

=== Massachusetts premieres ===
- Tiger Stripes (Amanda Nell Eu, Malaysia, 2023)

=== Other screenings ===
- Boy Kills World (Moritz Mohr, Germany/South Africa/US, 2023)

== 2025 ==
The 2025 festival took place from March 19 to March 24.

=== World premieres ===
- Alma and the Wolf (Michael Patrick Jann, US, 2025) – Director Michael Patrick Jann and actor Lukas Jann in attendance
- Re-Animator (Stuart Gordon, US, 1985) – World Premiere of 4K Restoration, Actress Barbara Crampton in attendance

=== New England premieres ===
- Best Wishes to All (Yuta Shimotsu, Japan, 2023)
- Frewaka (Aislinn Clarke, Ireland, 2024)
- Sister Midnight (Karan Kandhari, India, 2024)

=== East Coast premieres ===
- Chain Reactions (Alexandre O. Philippe, US, 2024)
- Escape From the 21st Century (Yang Li, China, 2024)
- Fucktoys (Annapurna Sriram, US, 2025) – Director Annapurna Sriram and actor Sadie Scott in attendance
- Head Like a Hole (Stefan MacDonald-Labelle, Canada, 2024) – Director Stefan MacDonald-Labelle in attendance
- The Ugly Stepsister (Emilie Blichfeldt, Norway, 2025)

=== Massachusetts premieres ===
- Vulcanizadora (Joel Potrykus, US, 2024)

=== Boston premieres ===
- The Surfer (Lorcan Finnegan, Australia/Ireland, 2024)

=== Repertory screenings ===
- Muerte en la Playa (Enrique Gomez Vadillo, Mexico, 1991)

== 2026 ==
The 2026 festival took place from March 18 to March 22.

=== East Coast premieres ===
- The Furious (Kenji Tanigaki, Hong Kong, 2026)
- Normal (Ben Wheatley, US/Canada, 2025) – Actor Bob Odenkirk attendance
- Obsession (Curry Barker, US, 2026)
- Sugar Rot (Becca Kozak, Canada, 2025) - Director Becca Kozak in attendance

=== New England premieres ===
- Boorman and the Devil (David Kittredge, US, 2025) - Director David Kittredge in attendance
- Buffet Infinity (Simon Glassman, Canada, 2025)
- Camp (Avalon Fast, Canada, 2025)
- The Cramps! A Period Piece (Brooke H. Cellars, US, 2025) - Director Brooke H. Cellars in attendance
- The Hedonist (Nick Funess, US, 2025) - Director/star Nick Funess in attendance
- Saccharine (Natalie Erika James, Australia, 2025)
- The Serpent's Skin (Alice Maio Mackay, Australia, 2025)

=== Repertory screenings ===
- Exorcist II: The Heretic (John Boorman, US, 1977) - Screened at the Coolidge Corner Theater
- The Devil's Rejects (Rob Zombie, US, 2005) - Actor Bill Moseley in attendance
- The Texas Chainsaw Massacre II (Tobe Hooper, US, 1986) - 40 year anniversary, actor Bill Moseley in attendance, co-presented by Rucking Fotten
