= Sanford International Film Festival =

Annual film festival in Sanford, Maine, U.S.

- Industry: film-exhibition
- Founded: 2014
- Founder: James Harmon II
- Headquarters: Sanford, Maine, United States of America
- Website: www.sanfordfilmfest.com

The Sanford International Film Festival is an annual event held in Sanford, Maine that specializes in independent film.

== History ==
Started in 2014 by James Harmon II, the first festival was quickly put together to showcase films that were originally scheduled to play the canceled Lewiston Auburn Film Festival. After the first festival's success and support from the city, plans were made to continue the festival as an annual event. The festival originally took place in May, but has moved to October in subsequent years.

In 2019, for their sixth year, Brian Boisvert is serving as the festival director.

The festival screenings are typically broken into recurrent categories, including: Horror Friday, Documentary Night, Mixed Genre Day, and SIFF After Hours. The popular Horror Friday section has included popular films with actors in attendance, including: The Texas Chain Saw Massacre with Gunnar Hansen and Nightbreed with Anne Bobby. The horror series has also included independent films, such as: Blood of the Tribades, Peelers, and In the Dark.

== The Tommy Award ==
The Sanford International Film Festival gives out trophies in a number of categories for short films and feature films called Tommy Awards, named for Sanford textile baron Thomas Goodall.

== Notable films featured ==
- The Texas Chain Saw Massacre - Tobe Hooper (1974)
- Nightbreed - Clive Barker (1990)
- Sarah's Room - Grant McPhee (2013)
- Bridge and Tunnel - Jason Michael Brescia (2014)
- Fiddlesticks - Veit Helmer (2014)
- The Hanover House - Corey Norman (2014)
- TEN – Sophia Cacciola & Michael J. Epstein (2014)
- Magnetic – Sophia Cacciola & Michael J. Epstein (2015)
- Truth Cocktail - Chris Goodwin (2016)
- WildLike - Frank Hall Green (2015)
- Blood of the Tribades – Sophia Cacciola & Michael J. Epstein (2016)
- Echo Lake - Jody McVeigh-Schultz (2016)
- Folclore - Pedro Anversa, João Segall (2016)
- On the 7th Date - Chris Goodwin (2016)
- Peelers - Sevé Schelenz (2016)
- You See Me - Linda Brown (2016)
- Leon Must Die - Lars Kokemüller (2017)
- (Romance) in the Digital Age - Jason Michael Brescia (2017)
- Sundown - Brendan Boogie (2017)
- Bearkittens - Lars Kokemüller (2018)
- Clickbait – Sophia Cacciola & Michael J. Epstein (2018)
