= The Once and Future Smash =

2022 mockumentary horror film by Sophia Cacciola and Michael J. Epstein

- Directed by: Sophia Cacciola; Michael J. Epstein
- Written by: Michael J. Epstein
- Produced by: Sophia Cacciola; Michael J. Epstein; Neal Jones
- Starring: Michael St. Michaels; Bill Weeden; A.J. Cutler; Mark Patton; Laurene Landon; Richard Elfman; Mark Torgl; Melanie Kinnaman; V.C. DuPree; Victor Miller; Marc Sheffler; Jennifer Rubin; Hélène Udy; Carl Solomon; Adam Marcus; Todd Farmer; John Dugan; Bill Johnson; Bob Elmore; Lloyd Kaufman; Claudio Fragasso; Rossella Drudi; Tim Dry
- Cinematography: Sophia Cacciola
- Edited by: Aaron Barrocas
- Music by: Catherine Capozzi
- Production company: Launch Over
- Release date: August 2022 (FrightFest)
- Running time: 83 minutes
- Country: United States
- Language: English

The Once and Future Smash is a 2022 mockumentary film directed by Sophia Cacciola and Michael J. Epstein. The film tells the story of Mikey Smash (Michael St. Michaels) and William Mouth (Bill Weeden), who both played the same football cannibal slasher character, Smash-Mouth, in the 1970 film, End Zone 2.

The film had a world premiere at FrightFest on August 29, 2022. The North American and United States premiere was held at Screamfest on October 19, 2022.

The film premiered publicly on August 6, 2024 on Starburst's web site.

== Plot ==
Longtime rivals, Mikey Smash and William Mouth, each played Smash-Mouth in the 1970 film, End Zone 2. Mikey is credited. William is not. They both attend the Mad Monster Party horror convention when they are promised that it would be their audition to reprise their role as the character in the modern End Zone reboot, which resumes the series one hour into End Zone 2, ignoring the end of the film and the sequels. They are accompanied by their assistant, AJ, son of Randall Browning, who played Smash-Mouth's sidekick AJ in the original 1970 film.

== Description ==
Emilie Black of Cinema Crazed says that, "The Once and Future Smash follows both actors who have been credited as Smash Mouth in End Zone 2 as they go to a convention where fans are awaiting them while mixing in interviews with some of horror industry's greats. The film mixes these two elements beautifully well, giving the viewer a chance to see how End Zone 2 has impacted those who have seen it and how it became a cult favorite." Moving Pictures Film Club states that the film "crosses into This Is Spinal Tap territory with its farcical and at times surreal portrayal of the lives of the fading stars of retro-grindhouse-slasher movies who were not able to reach the classic cult status of franchises like A Nightmare on Elm Street or Halloween. Mikey (Michael St. Michaels) and William (Bill Weeden) are haplessly hilarious as the two actors behind the cannibal football player Smash Mouth and represent perfectly the rivalry – whether real or imagined – between the different actors behind Hollywood horror icons. There's also a satirical depiction of the behaviour of production companies that aim to revive horror franchises and completely miss the mark on how to do so with heart."

The film also references many horror franchises and cult films, sometimes using talking-head interviews with actors involved with those films, a layering that podcast Horror Hangout described as "Wes Craven and beyond levels of meta-narrative."

== Cast ==
- Michael St. Michaels as Mikey Smash
- Bill Weeden as William Mouth
- A.J. Cutler as A.J.
- Kevin Allen as Jackie J. Jackson
- Jeff Ball as Security Guard
- James Balsamo as North Carolina End Zone 2 Fan Club Treasurer / Elvis impersonator
- Bethany Boles as Judge
- Brendan Boogie as Bartender at the offices of Paul Devine
- William L. Bozarth as North Carolina End Zone 2 Fan Club Vice President
- James Branscome as James Branscome
- Chris Burke as Moist the Clown
- Julia Cacciola as Julie Kane
- Sophia Cacciola as Sophia Cacciola
- Catherine Capozzi as Catherine Capozzi
- Chris Cartusciello as Hotel Concierge / Damn Dirty Ape
- Joe Castro as Blaze Pauling
- Seth Chatfield as Detective Frank Dobson (voice)
- Sean Clark as Marty Thomas
- Chloé Cunha as Jacques Renault (voice)
- Rossella Drudi as Rossella Drudi
- Tim Dry as Seedy Movie Salesman (voice)
- John Dugan as John Dugan
- Vincent Craig Dupree as V.C. DuPree
- Anastasia Elfman as Dahlia Dimont
- Richard Elfman as Richard Elfman
- Jennifer Rubin as Jennifer Rubin
- Hélène Udy as Hélène Udy
- Bob Elmore as Bob Elmore
- Michael J. Epstein as Repo Man
- Todd Farmer as Todd Farmer
- Claudio Fragasso as Claudio Fragasso
- Liesel Hanson as Patricia Ford
- Heidi Honeycutt as Heidi Honeycutt
- Nick Hunt as I Make A Warm Cozy Quilt From Your Skin Fan
- Christine Jarrett as I Make A Warm Cozy Quilt From Your Skin Fan
- Bill Johnson as Bill Johnson
- Neal Jones as Neal Jones
- Michael Kallio as Mike 'Dilly' Dilworth
- Lloyd Kaufman as Lloyd Kaufman
- Jackie Kelly as Edie Sedgwick
- Michael Paul King as TV News Anchor / Radio News Anchor
- Melanie Kinnaman as Melanie Kinnaman
- Laurene Landon as Laurene Landon
- Adam Marcus as Adam Marcus
- Brigid Marshall as Snyflan Crump
- Eben McGarr as Eben McGarr
- Victor Miller as Victor Miller
- Jason Minton as Carter the Intern
- Kemper Noah as Kid with $19
- Lianne O'Shea as Bernadette Ryan
- Loucylle Orren as Clown girl
- Jazmin Ortiz as Boom operator
- Gabriel Ospina as Ricky
- Mark Patton as Mark Patton
- Ian S. Peterson as Topher Brandon
- Maiya Reaves as Melody Riviera
- Joe Ripple as North Carolina End Zone 2 Fan Club President
- Jared Rivet as Jared Rivet
- Trista Robinson as Percy Wynne
- Marc Sheffler as Marc Sheffler
- Eric Sheslow as Repo Man / Jackie's Boss
- Jeff Simon as Blender manual autograph seeker
- Carl Solomon as Tex Beckerson / Tex Beckerson Jr.
- Jeffrey Stackhouse as Paul Devine
- Mark Torgl as Mark Torgl
- Cristian James Watkins as Piggy
- Dan Yeager as Dan Yeager

== Production ==
Rue Morgue notes that the movie was partially filmed at the Mad Monster Party horror convention and the filmmakers described the challenges of the experience: "The convention portion of the movie was one of the most challenging shoots we've ever done," they continue. "Normally we do as much planning as we can, and we have a lot of control over what we shoot, but because it was a live convention, we had to be flexible and ready for anything. This made for some happy surprises, but was also really difficult. For instance, a scene that played out at the official costume contest ended up being a major emotional moment for the actors, but wasn't even something we knew was going to happen. We shot with multiple cameras and tried our best to cover everything important that was going on."

== Reception ==
The Once and Future Smash has received mostly positive reviews. Darren Lucas of Movie Reviews 101 describes it as, "one of the smartest comedy documentaries you will see." Upcoming on Screen says, "The Once and Future Smash is an absolute treat for genre fans. With so many wonderful moments carefully laden within the spoof film that you could easily find yourself clapping away at it. Just a joy of a film." Paul Chapinal of Film News notes, "...a beautifully observed and lovingly made spoof by writers and directors Sophia Cacciola and Michael J. Epstein, with Cacciola going before the camera towards the end as the whole thing starts to get out of control. During the film there are snippets of End Zone 2, which has a full run after the main feature. That the filmmakers could get so many horror industry notables in and happy to send themselves up and go along with the flow, says that there’s not a mean bone here."

Actors St. Michaels, Weeden, and Cutler also have received critical praise from critics with AJ Friar of Infamous Horror stating, "There's great deadpan chemistry between the leads...A.J. Cutler gives a breakout performance in this mockumentary that should get him massive amount of love for being this damn funny and a scene stealer from Michael and Bill." Kim Newman highlights the pair of leads noting, "they both commit wholeheartedly to the roles, with Weeden going further than you’d think in laying himself emotionally and physically bare."

== Festivals and awards ==
- FrightFest - August 29, 2022 - London, UK - World Premiere
- Screamfest - October 19, 2022 - Los Angeles, CA - North American Premiere
- Nightmares Film Festival - October 23, 2022 - Columbus, OH - Midwest Premiere
- Morbido Film Festival - Oct 31, 2022 - Mexico City, Mexico
- Be Afraid Horror Fest - November 25–27, 2022 - Gorizia, Italy
- South Texas Underground Film Festival - Nov 30-Dec 4, 2022 - Corpus Christi, TX - Winner: Best of Fest Feature, Directors' Choice
- The South African Independent Film Festival - Nov 25-27, 2022 - Capetown/Johannesburg, South Africa - Winner: Best Documentary Feature
- New York City Horror Film Festival - Dec 1-4, 2022 - New York, NY - Winner: Best Horror Comedy Feature
- Renegade Film Festival - March 2–4, 2023 - Marietta, GA - Winner: Indie Spirit Award
- Panic Film Festival - April 13–19, 2023 - Kansas City MO
- Bruggore Film Festival - April 28, 2023 - Brugg Switzerland
- GASP! Horror Fest - June 18, 2023 - Manchester UK
- Chattanooga Film Festival - June 23–29, 2023 - Chattanooga, TN
- Gen Con - August 3–6, 2023 - Indianapolis, IN - Winner: Best Documentary
- Buffalo Dreams Fantastic Film Festival - August 20, 2023 - Buffalo NY - Winner: Outstanding Comedy Feature
- GenreBlast Film Festival - September 1, 2023 - Winchester VA - Winner: GenreBlast Forever Award
- The Dead of Night Film Festival - October 8, 2023 - Liverpool UK
- Hysteria Film Festival - October 19 & 20, 2023 - St Louis, MO - Audience Award Winner: Best Feature, Jury Award Winner Best Actor Feature Film: Bill Weeden
- The Milwaukee Twisted Dreams Film Festival - October 22, 2023 - Milwaukee, WI - Winner: Best Director, Best Ensemble Cast, Best Supporting Performance: Bill Weeden
