= Chozick =

Chozick is a surname. Notable people with the surname include:

- Amy Chozick, American political reporter
- Matthew Chozick (born 1980), American actor, writer, and television personality
