= BizarroLand Film Festival =

- Location: Orlando, Florida, USA
- Founded: 2015
- Language: International

BizarroLand Film Festival (until January 2022: Sick 'n' Wrong Film Festival) is a film festival that is showcasing the most aggressively bizarre midnight, underground, outsider, and weirdo cinema of all genres. It is based in Orlando, Florida and run by Stephen Stull. It is cited as one of the most bizarre genre film festivals in the USA and Dread Central listed it as one of the best horror festivals in the world.

== History ==
It was founded in 2015 by Stephen Stull. In an interview with PopHorror, Stull defines the philosophy of the festival:

Sick 'n' Wrong is a film festival for what I generally refer to as aggressively bizarre movies. If anybody has ever seen movies referred to as midnight movies, they're going to understand right away what I'm talking about. If I were ever to program a lineup of features that had already played and were never submitted, just a dream lineup, I would love to have Eraserhead and The Holy Mountain and The Greasy Strangler at the festival. If somebody hasn't seen movies like these, it's really hard to define because they end up assuming I'm talking about gore porn, and that's definitely not the case.

The festival is held annually in different venues in the Orlando area and is a permanent fixture in the arts calendar of Orlando.

The festival team is also engaged in the production of movies, for example The Transformations of the Transformations of the Drs. Jenkins that premiered at GenreBlast Film Festival 2021. The film featured the festival director Stephen Stull and collaborators like Michael J. Epstein.

In January 2022 the festival got renamed into BizarroLand Film Festival.

== Awards ==
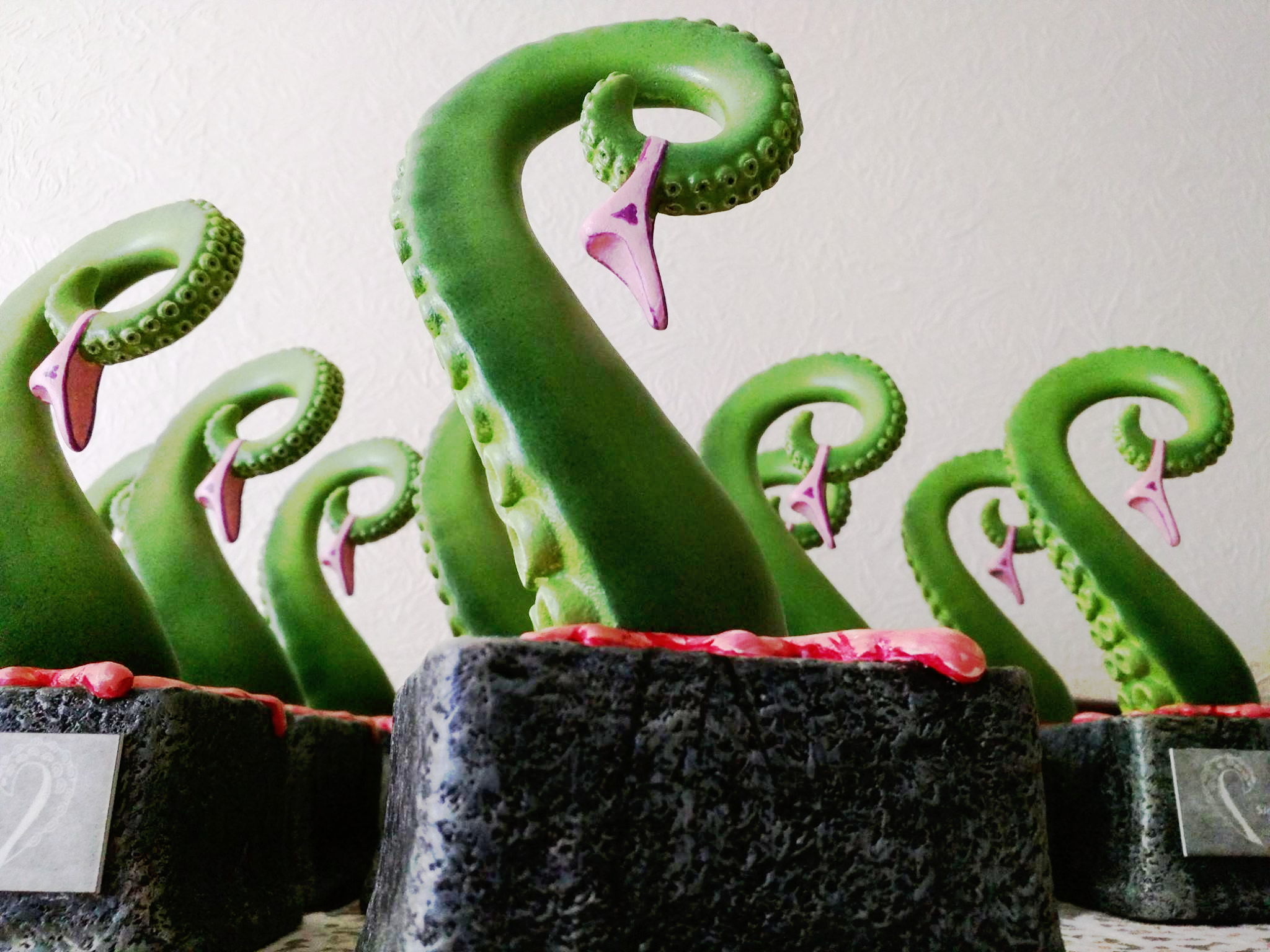
Sick 'n' Wrong Film Festival Awards 2017

The Sickies are BizarroLand's awards statues. They are designed by Brad Bailey and hand sculpted and painted by Paul and Debra Berg. They are being awarded annually in 12 categories, including:

- The Sickest Award "for the most gut-wrenching visual content"
- The Wrongest Award "for the most morally abhorrent story"
- The Audience Favorite, voted on by festival attendees

The grand prize award statues presented at BizarroLand are:

- The Pink Tentacle "for the short film that best embodies the spirit of BizarroLand"
- The Golden Tentacle "for the feature film that best embodies the spirit of BizarroLand"

== Film Production ==
The festival also launched a production arm in 2021, raising money for an anthology film, Fat Fleshy Fingers, on Kickstarter. The film premiered at Film Maudit 2.0 in January 2023.

== See also ==
- List of fantastic and horror film festivals
