= Jade Sylvan =

American writer, performer, producer, and performing artist

Jude Sylvan
- Born: Chicago, Illinois
- Occupation: Author
- Writing career
- Notable work: Kissing Oscar Wilde (2013)

Jude Sylvan (born Chicago, Illinois) is an American poet, author, performer, producer, performing artist and Unitarian Universalist minister. They are heavily rooted in the literary and performance community of Cambridge and Somerville, Massachusetts. They were called a "risque queer icon" by the Boston Globe.

== Early life and education ==
Jude Sylvan was raised in Indianapolis, Indiana and later in the suburb of Carmel. They graduated from Carmel High School in 2001 and graduated from Indiana University Bloomington in 2006. They moved to the Boston area in 2007.

Sylvan obtained a Master of Divinity degree from Harvard Divinity School in 2020, in pursuit of Unitarian Universalist ordination. During school, they worked as the LGBTQ Ministries + Gender Justice intern at the Unitarian Universalist Association. Sylvan became interested in the Bible while at HDS, publishing an article comparing the Gospels to fanfiction. They won the HDS Billings Preaching Prize for their sermon, "Interrupting the Flow of Hate." For their capstone project, Sylvan wrote and produced Beloved King: A Queer Bible Musical.

== Performances ==
Sylvan has toured extensively, performing their work to audiences across the United States, Canada, and Europe. Over the past decade, Sylvan has produced and performed in acclaimed stage-shows and workshops in collaboration with entities such as The Museum of Fine Arts Boston, Harvard University, and Mass Poetry.

In 2012, Sylvan co-wrote and starred in the feature-film TEN (awarded "Runner-Up" for Best Screenplay and Best Genre Film at the Imaginarium Film Festival), and was also commissioned to write the official novelization of the film.

In 2015, there was fundraising and a public read-through for Spider Cult: The Musical, an "apocalyptic lesbian fringe sci-fi horror musical" that Sylvan wrote with burlesque performer Fem Bones and musician Catherine Capozzi. It was called a "stunning piece of showmanship" by Wickedlocal.com. The New England Theatre Geek website called it, "a black comedy with pasties, a grind house flick for the stage."

From 2013-2019, Sylvan collaborated with Mx Macabre to create a musical burlesque show called The Sailor Moon Shoujo Spectacular. The show included costume contests, academic readings, drag shows, and musical performances.

Sylvan was interviewed about Beloved King by Cambridge Day, saying, "I think people are excited...to see the thing that you were told was not for you, but being told for you." WBUR, Boston's NPR radio station said the show was, "exploring the human connections, the warring desires and passions, the relationships between the figures of David, Saul and Jonathan."

The live performances of Beloved King were scheduled for March 2020 but were postponed due to the emergence of the COVID-19 crisis in the United States, with an early outbreak occurring in Boston. After a writer for Broadway.com viewed a livestreamed dress rehearsal in May 2020, they wrote that it was, "a sweeping story that fits the reputation of the Old Testament and certainly approached in a way that captures the imagination of a modern audience." For their work on Beloved King, Sylvan was awarded a Live Arts Boston grant in support of local performing artists.

== Publications ==
Sylvan is the author The Spark Singer, a collection of poetry. Their most recent book, Kissing Oscar Wilde (Write Bloody Publishing), a novelized memoir about the author's experience as a touring poet in Paris, was a finalist for the New England Book Award and the Bisexual Book Award.

Sylvan has written for The Washington Post, BuzzFeed, The Toast, PANK Magazine, and elsewhere about polyamory, queer identity, and LGBT issues.

They published an open letter to Mark Zuckerberg in the Washington Post in 2014, which addressed concerns of gender equality. It focused on concerns regarding damages to the LGBT community brought about by Facebook policies regarding real-name assignments, as the policies limit authentic self-expression and endanger those who maintain multiple identities for safety reasons.

== Published works ==
- Kissing Oscar Wilde (ISBN 9781938912320)
- The Spark Singer (ISBN 9781933132730)
