= GenreBlast Film Festival =

Annual event held in the Winchester, Virginia area that specializes in genre film

- Industry: film-exhibition
- Founded: 2016
- Founder: Nathan Ludwig, Chad Farmer, Raygan Ketterer
- Headquarters: Winchester, Virginia, United States of America
- Website: www.genreblast.com

The GenreBlast Film Festival is an annual event held in the Winchester, Virginia area that specializes in genre film. GenreBlast is the largest genre film festival in the Washington, D.C. region, spotlighting short and feature films that are typically independently produced and would not otherwise receive theatrical release.

== History ==
Started in 2016, by Nathan Ludwig, Chad Farmer, and Charles Hill, the first annual GenreBlast Film Festival took place in August 2016 in Culpeper, Virginia at the now defunct State Theatre. Programmers officially described the fest as playing, "horror, action/adventure, sci-fi, fantasy, martial arts, exploitation, grindhouse, international, experimental and more!"

After the first year, the festival relocated to the Alamo Drafthouse Cinema in Winchester, Virginia, where it has been located since. Hill departed from the team after the second year of the fest and Raygan Ketterer, previously the fest designer, replaced Hill as programmer.

GenreBlast is attended by filmmakers and writers whose work is recognized by the fest, with about 50% of films represented in the first year and a much higher percentage in subsequent years. It has also been judged to be a top genre fest.

== Awards ==
GenreBlast gives out rocket trophies in a number of categories for short films, feature films, and unproduced screenplays. The festival also gives out a special wrestling belt to recognize an outstanding woman in genre film each year. The Les Femmes Du Genre Award was given to Tristan Risk in 2016, Samantha Kolesnik in 2017, and Sophia Cacciola in 2018.

GenreBlast also gives out the "Forever Award" for a film that "a film that truly encapsulates the spirit of the fest — fiercely independent, highly original, and spectacularly innovative." The 2020 recipient was Force to Fear. The 2021 recipient was The Transformations of the Transformations of the Drs. Jenkins. The 2022 recipient was Gouge Away. The 2023 recipient was The Once and Future Smash.

== Notable films featured ==
- Night of Something Strange – Jonathan Straiton (2016)
- Blood of the Tribades – Sophia Cacciola & Michael J. Epstein (2016)
- Scratch – Maninder Chana (2016)
- Innsmouth – Izzy Lee (2016)
- Frankenstein Created Bikers – James Bickert (2016)
- Camino – Justin Herring (2017)
- Dead Bullet – Erik Reese (2017)
- Family Possessions – Tommy Faircloth (2017)
- Future – Rob Cousineau & Chris Rosik (2017)
- Guardians – Mark Brown (2017)
- Happy Hunting – Joel Dietsch & Louis Gibson (2017)
- Lilith's Awakening – Monica Demes (2017)
- She's Allergic to Cats – Michael Reich (2017)
- The Naughty List - Paul Campion (2017)
- Boyne Falls – Steve Kopera (2018)
- Butterfly Kisses – Erik Kristopher Myers (2018)
- The VelociPastor – Brendan Steere (2018)
- Loon – Lillian Langston & Andrew Bassett (2018)
- Murder Made Easy – Dave Palamaro (2018)
- The Nothing – Clayton Thompson (2018)
- Amazon Hot Box – James Bickert (2018)
- She Was So Pretty: Be Good for Goodness Sake – Brooklyn Ewing (2018)
- Livescream – Michelle Iannantuono (2018)
- Clickbait – Sophia Cacciola & Michael J. Epstein (2018)
- I'm Dreaming of a White Doomsday – Mike Lombardo (2018)
- Lieutenant Jangles – Nic Champeaux (2018)
- House Shark – Ron Bonk (2018)
- The Psyborgs – David Hiatt (2018)
- Bong of the Living Dead – Max Groah (2018)
- Top Knot Detective – Aaron McCann & Dominic Pearce (2018)
- The Ranger – Jenn Wexler (2018)
- Unterwelt: The World Beyond – Ralf Kemper (2018)
- Socket – Christopher Beaubien (2018)
- Force to Fear (2020)
- The Transformations of the Transformations of the Drs. Jenkins (2021)
- Red Snow — Sean Nichols Lynch (2021)
- Fresh Hell — Ryan Imhoff & Matt Neal (2022)
- The Once and Future Smash / End Zone 2 – Sophia Cacciola & Michael J. Epstein (2022)
- Livescreamers – Michelle Iannantuono (2023)
