= Ten (2014 film) =

- Film poster
- Directed by: Sophia Cacciola; Michael J. Epstein
- Written by: Michael J. Epstein; Sarah Wait Zaranek; Jade Sylvan; Sophia Cacciola
- Produced by: Sophia Cacciola; Michael J. Epstein
- Starring: Jade Sylvan; Molly Carlisle; Molly Devon; Karin Webb; Kerri Lynch; Leah Principe; Rachel Leah Blumenthal; Susannah Plaster; Porcelain Dalya; Sophia Cacciola
- Cinematography: Kelly Davidson
- Edited by: Michael J. Epstein
- Music by: Catherine Capozzi
- Production company: Launch Over
- Release date: March 30, 2014 (Boston Underground Film Festival)
- Running time: 122 minutes
- Country: United States
- Language: English

Ten (styled in all-capital letters as TEN) is a 2014 thriller/horror film directed by Sophia Cacciola and Michael J. Epstein in which ten women find themselves in a vacant mansion on an island. The film had its world premiere on March 30, 2014 at the Boston Underground Film Festival and features an all-female ensemble cast.

Funding for the film was partially raised through a successful Kickstarter campaign. The film is distributed in North America by BrinkVision in April 2015.

== Plot ==
Ten women find themselves in a vacant mansion on Spektor Island in December 1972. Each believes she's traveled to the house on business, but they all agree that something seems strange. For one thing, the entire house is full of pictures and statues of pigs.

The women all come from drastically different walks of life. None of them would have chosen to spend the night together in such an eerie place, but the last ferry for the mainland has just left, and a terrible storm is rolling in. Trying to make the best of an unpleasant situation, they raid the mansion's wine cellar and throw a party. As the night creeps on, however, it becomes clear that someone—or something—has arranged to get them in the house. It's not long before someone mentions that Spektor Island is supposed to be haunted. Of course, no one in the house believes in ghosts. At least, not until the first murder.

What do an actress, a religious zealot, a renegade, a college student, a model, a singer, a medium, a real-estate investor, a historian, and a doctor have in common? None of them is who they seem. Yet, the fate of the entire world may rest in their hands.

== Cast ==
- Jade Sylvan as the renegade
- Molly Carlisle as the zealot
- Molly Devon as the real-estate investor
- Karin Webb as the medium
- Kerri Lynch as the actress
- Leah Principe as the model
- Rachel Leah Blumenthal as the historian
- Susannah Plaster as the doctor
- Porcelain Dalya as the co-ed
- Sophia Cacciola as the folk singer

== Production ==
Filming took place in Barrington, RI, Somerville, MA, and Gloucester, MA from December 4 through December 14, 2012.

== Festivals and awards ==
- Boston Underground Film Festival 2014 (Boston, MA)
- Terror Con Film Festival 2014 (Providence, RI) - WINNER BEST ACTRESS: Porcelain Dalya
- Brooklyn Girl Film Festival 2014 (Brooklyn, NY)
- Sanford International Film Festival 2014 (Sanford, ME)
- Fright Night Film Festival 2014 (Louisville, KY)
- Fright Night Horror Weekend 2014 (Louisville, KY)
- Jennifer’s Bodies 2014 (Scotland)
- Scare-a-con Film Festival 2014 (Verona, NY) - NOMINATED: Best Cinematography
- New Orleans Comic Expo and Horror Film Festival 2014 (New Orleans, LA)
- Imaginarium Film Festival 2014 (Louisville, KY)

== Reception ==
Michael Gingold of Fangoria described TEN as, "up to something a little different, looking to subvert audience expectations...and while TEN contains the scenario's requisite blood and nudity, it veers off in directions you likely won't see coming, both in narrative terms and in the way it explores questions of female identity". Lauren Shiro of Curve wrote, “deeper still, the movie takes on a political and sociological stance, examining stereotypes, identity, and also the subtext and themes behind story lines.” Jed Gottlieb of the Boston Herald described TEN as, "imagine Scream crossed with The Usual Suspects...The art comes with meticulously framed shots full of color, the enjoyment with puzzling out the crazy plot twists".
