= The Motion Sick =

Indie rock band from Boston

- Origin: Boston
- Genres: Alternative rock, indie rock, post-punk
- Years active: 2006–2010
- Past members: Michael J. Epstein; Matthew Girard; Travis Richter; Patrick Mussari; Jane Allard
- Website: blog.mikeandsophia.com/2012/08/the-motion-sick-landing-page/

The Motion Sick was an indie rock band formed in Boston around 2006 known for "infectious, upbeat pop" and melancholy lyrics. The band released two full-length albums, Her Brilliant Fifteen (2006) and The truth will catch you, just wait... (2008) as well as a split 7-inch with Golden Bloom (2010) and an EP of novelty songs (2010).

They sprung into notoriety after being featured as band of the month in SPIN Magazine in early 2006 and were selected as the best unsigned band in Boston by commercial radio station WFNX during the Last Band Standing competition. They also won The Boston Phoenix Best Local Band 2009 honor.

In 2008, the lead single from their second album, "30 Lives" aired extensively on TV stations around the world including MTV, Fuse TV, and MuchMusic. The song and video were noted for featuring a reference to using a video game code (The Konami Code) to get 30 lives to spend with a partner. The music video is a satire of 1950s and 1980s high-school movies and musicals and contains references to Grease, Back to the Future, Weird Science, and others. In late 2008, the song and video were included in several releases of the video game Dance Dance Revolution: DDR X DDR X2 (Arcade game and PlayStation 2) and DDR Universe 3 (Xbox 360).

The Motion Sick has been on indefinite hiatus since 2010, reuniting for a one-off show in 2013.

== Discography ==
=== Studio albums ===
- Her Brilliant Fifteen (2006)
- The truth will catch you, just wait... (2008)

=== EPs ===
- Novelty Songs Volume 1 (2010)
- Golden Bloom vs. The Motion Sick 7-inch (2010)

=== Singles ===
- "Satellite" (2006)
- "Pre-Existing Condition" (2006)
- "30 Lives" (2008)

=== Miscellaneous ===
- "Winged Bicycle" on Consequence of Sound Anniversary Mix Tape (2008)
- "Doomsday Devices" (Golden Bloom Version on Purple 7" Vinyl)

=== Music videos ===
Video	Album	Recorded in	Director
"Satellite"	The Motion Sick	2006	Gem
"Pre-Existing Condition"	The Motion Sick	2006	Gem
"30 Lives"	The Motion Sick	2008	Neil Forman
"Aquaman's Lament"	The Motion Sick	2010	Leesa Coyne
"I Grew A Mustache"	The Motion Sick	2010	Michael J. Epstein
