= Buffalo Dreams Fantastic Film Festival =

- Industry: film-exhibition
- Founded: 2013
- Founder: Gregory Lamberson, Chris Scioli
- Headquarters: Buffalo, New York, United States of America
- Website: Buffalo Dreams Fantastic Film Festival

Buffalo Dreams Fantastic Film Festival is an international film festival in Buffalo, New York.

Founded by Chris Scioli and Gregory Lamberson, the festival runs for 10 days which and shows films from around the world.

The festival is described as seeking "bold, original and edgy films that are well made" and to help film makers from Western New York screen their work. The festival is also known for its shorts blocks.

== Notable guests ==
The festival often partners with Lloyd Kaufman and Troma to show early screenings of Troma films. Screenwriter and film producer Roy Frumkes judged the unproduced original screenplay competition for the 2016 season.

== Awards ==
The festival awards include special Dreamer Awards, Filmmaker of the Year Awards, Living Legend Awards, and the Lois Weber Award, for contemporary female filmmakers.

The 2017 special award winners were Adrian Esposito (Filmmaker of the Year), Devi Snively (Lois Weber Award), Fred Olen Ray (Living Legend Award), Jon Keeyes (Dedication to Excellence in Filmmaking), and Christopher Olen Ray (Indie Genre Spirit Award). The 2018 special award winners were Brett Kelly (Filmmaker of the Year), Sophia Cacciola (Lois Weber Award), Michael J. Epstein (Dedication to Excellence in Independent Filmmaking), and Sam Qualiana (Indie Genre Spirit Award).

== Notable films featured ==
The Incident (2015)

- Blood of the Tribades (2016)
- Let Her Out (2016)
- Night of the Virgin (2016)
- Tonight She Comes (2016)
- Post Apocalyptic Commando Shark (2018)
- I Dare You to Open Your Eyes (2018)
- Johnny Gruesome (2018)
- Clickbait (2018)
- Derelicts (2018)
- Tommy Battles the Silver Sea Dragon (2018)
- LUZ: The Flower of Evil (2020)
- Fang (2022)
