= Lawrence J. Epstein =

American author

Lawrence Jeffrey Epstein (born 1946) is an American author who writes and lectures about American culture and society, Jewish life, and mystery fiction. He is best known for his book The Haunted Smile: The Story of Jewish Comedians in America and his Danny Ryle Mysteries series. He writes intermittently about Bob Dylan and popular culture for The Best American Poetry blog.

== Biography ==
Epstein was born in New York City and raised there and in Sag Harbor, New York. His father was a merchant and Veterans' Counselor. His mother was a photographer and housewife. He got a B.A., M.A. and Ph.D. from the University at Albany. From 1974 until 2008 he was a professor of English at Suffolk County Community College, where he also held jobs as assistant head of the Department of English and chairperson of the Humanities Division.

In an interview, Epstein described his intentions for The Haunted Smile: "I wanted to tell the story of Jewish comedians in America starting at the turn of the 20th century ... Then I traced the history of the comedians through vaudeville, radio, movies, and tv ... I was interested, for example, in how one generation of comedians influenced another. I got to go to a Friars Roast and go backstage at a comedy club. I also interviewed more than 70 people ... I wanted to include the struggles Jewish comedians had, and the weight of their past."

Filmmaker Michael J. Epstein is his son.

In 2018, he started publishing The Danny Ryle Mysteries, including the titles: At the end of 2018 he began to publish his most successful mystery series. The books in the series include The Dead Don't Talk, A Darker Shade of Blood, The Starry Night of Death, and The Hunted Girl.

== Bibliography ==
- Lawrence J. Epstein (1981). Samuel Goldwyn. Twayne Publishers. ISBN 0805792821.
- Lawrence J. Epstein (1989). A Treasury of Jewish Anecdotes. Jason Aronson. ISBN 0876688903.
- Lawrence J. Epstein (2001). The Haunted Smile: The Story of Jewish Comedians in America. PublicAffairs. ISBN 1586481622.
- Lawrence J. Epstein (2004). Mixed Nuts: America's Love Affair With Comedy Teams From Burns and Allen to Belushi and Aykroyd. PublicAffairs. ISBN 1586481908.
- Lawrence J. Epstein (2007). At the Edge of a Dream: The Story of Jewish Immigrants on New York's Lower East Side, 1880-1920. Jossey-Bass. ISBN 978-0787986223.
- Lawrence J. Epstein (2010). Political Folk Music in America from Its Origins to Bob Dylan. McFarland. ISBN 9780786448623.
- Lawrence J. Epstein (2011). George Burns: An American Life. McFarland. ISBN 9780786458493.
- Lawrence J. Epstein (2012). The Land of Eighteen Dreams. BookLocker. ISBN 9781614348726.
- Lawrence J. Epstein (2013). The Basic Beliefs of Judaism: A Twenty-first-Century Guide to a Timeless Tradition. Jason Aronson. ISBN 978-0765709691.
- Lawrence J. Epstein (2016). The Gallery of Missing Husbands. BookBaby. ASIN B01GQFFCUA.
- Lawrence J. Epstein (2017). Exiles: A Mystery in Paris. BookBaby. ASIN B01N95U9UL.
- Lawrence J. Epstein (2017). Americans and the Birth of Israel. Rowman & Littlefield. ISBN 978-1442271227.
- Lawrence J. Epstein (2017). Chaos: A Tale of Murder and Conspiracy. Fig Hollow Publishing. ASIN B071VDK6Z3.
- Lawrence J. Epstein (2017). Back to Life: A Hollywood Historical Mystery Novel. Fig Hollow Publishing. ASIN B0747PKM1F.
- Lawrence J. Epstein (2017). Thou Shalt Not Kill Twice. Fig Hollow Publishing. ASIN B07774M1G3.
- Lawrence J. Epstein (2018). Should I Convert to Judaism?. Fig Hollow Publishing. ASIN B079NSKRTR.
- Lawrence J. Epstein (2018). The Zero Commandment. Fig Hollow Publishing. ASIN B079WS2LD3.
- Lawrence J. Epstein (2018). Targets. Fig Hollow Publishing. ASIN B07F9FMMN6.
- Lawrence J. Epstein (2018). The Dead Don't Talk. Fig Hollow Publishing. ASIN B07LF13Y3G.
- Lawrence J. Epstein (2019). A Darker Shade of Blood. Fig Hollow Publishing. ASIN B07PBHCD6G.
- Lawrence J. Epstein (2019). The Starry Night of Death. Fig Hollow Publishing. ASIN B07RJ8C5TN.
- Lawrence J. Epstein (2019). The Hunted Girl. Fig Hollow Publishing. ASIN B07TJZ9F4T.
- Lawrence J. Epstein (2020). The Hidden Hand of Death. Fig Hollow Publishing. ASIN B086T371T7.
- Lawrence J. Epstein (2020). The Dead Crawl Home. Fig Hollow Publishing. ASIN B08KS7DSM9.
