= Magnetic (film) =

- Allix Mortis as Alice in Magnetic
- Directed by: Sophia Cacciola; Michael J. Epstein
- Written by: Sophia Cacciola; Michael J. Epstein
- Produced by: Sophia Cacciola; Michael J. Epstein
- Starring: Allix Mortis
- Cinematography: Kelly Davidson
- Edited by: Sophia Cacciola; Michael J. Epstein
- Music by: Night Kisses; Catherine Capozzi; Sophia Cacciola; Michael J. Epstein
- Production company: Launch Over
- Distributed by: Devolver Digital; Wild Eye Releasing
- Release date: March 29, 2015 (Boston Underground Film Festival)
- Running time: 80 minutes
- Country: United States
- Language: English

Magnetic is a 2015 science fiction psychological film written, produced, edited and directed by Sophia Cacciola and Michael J. Epstein, featuring Allix Mortis as the only cast member. Funding for the film was partially raised through a successful Kickstarter campaign. The film is distributed in North America on VOD by Devolver Digital via Indie Rights and in North America on DVD by Wild Eye Releasing.

== Cast ==
- Allix Mortis as Alice

== Production ==
Filming took place around the Western New York and Massachusetts area from December 2013 through November 2014.

== Release ==
The film had its world premiere on March 29, 2015 at the Boston Underground Film Festival

== Critical response ==
Magnetic has received primarily mixed-to-positive reviews, with most finding the movie challenging and noting the narrative ambiguity and complexity.

Daniel XIII of Famous Monsters of Filmland wrote, “The best way I can get you into the mindset of MAGNETIC is to say, what if instead of Lewis Carroll, 80s-era Gary Numan wrote Alice in Wonderland on an absinthe binge while covered in magnetic tape surrounded by a complete run of Jack Kirby's 2001 comics. Sounds strange, right? Well, the movie is 100 times more insane, in the most f'n glorious way possible!” Wicked Channel rated the movie 8/10, stating, "The best way to describe this film is, a controlled insanity. I love when people do not follow convention, and these two seem to diving in that deep pool a lot." Mike Snoonian of Film Thrills also praised the film, saying, "...managed to harness a phenomenal performance out of their lead and turn in a thought provoking and reflective examination on our need for intimacy. It's a challenging work, but a rewarding one for the viewer that sticks with it."

Jeff Berkwits of Sci Fi magazine wrote, “…as with The Prisoner, those who stick with the tale will be richly rewarded.”

Peter Wong of Beyond Chron found some positive elements, but in an overall mixed response, noted, "some viewers' heads will understandably explode in confusion."

Way Too Indie also gave a mixed response, "There's no question the filmmakers recognize catchy beats, or that they can create a stylish, moody atmosphere. But constructing complex sci-fi ideas into an engaging low-budget thriller may have been a little too ambitious."

The most negative review came from Next Projection, "The story is too complicated to rely on so little structure, bringing in a mishmash of elements that struggle to communicate with one another."

== Other media ==
The film is one of the main subjects of the book Indie Science Fiction Cinema Today: Conversations with 21st Century Filmmakers, and an image from the film is on the cover of the book. The authors further analyze the film: "Using a single lead character to stand in as every individual human being in the world, Magnetic is an audacious and surreal journey. Extrapolating long-held fears of societal breakdown and imminent destruction that surface in times of rapid human advancement or global tragedy, the film's visual flair and stream-of-consciousness narrative turn these fears into intensely personal elements."

== See also ==
- List of films featuring time loops
