= The Life and Death of a Porno Gang =

2009 Serbian exploitation film by Mladen Djordjević

- Directed by: Mladen Djordjević
- Written by: Mladen Djordjević
- Produced by: Srdan Golubović; Jelena Mitrović
- Starring: Mihajlo Jovanović
- Cinematography: Nemanja Jovanov
- Edited by: Marko Glušac; Milina Trisić
- Music by: Janga Loncar
- Production company: Film House Bas Celik
- Release date: 2009
- Running time: 90 minutes
- Country: Serbia
- Language: Serbian

The Life and Death of a Porno Gang (Serbian: Život i smrt porno bande) is a 2009 Serbian exploitation horror film following a group of travelling sex show performers and pornographic filmmakers who are lured into making snuff films.

== Synopsis ==
Marko (Mihajlo Jovanović) is an unsuccessful director that begins filming with Cane (Srdjan Miletić), a porn director, after he finds himself unable to successfully shoot his own films. Through these films Marko finds an outlet for the anger he feels towards society, as well as a new group of friends in the porn industry. Marko eventually has a falling out with Cane and starts his own porn cabaret club. An initially positive beginning turns sour when Cane's brother interrupts a film premiere, resulting in the press destroying Marko and his club. Marko debates leaving the city, but is approached by a German journalist who suggests that Marko begin making snuff films.

== Cast ==
- Mihajlo Jovanović as Marko
- Ana Acimović as Una
- Predrag Damnjanović as Vanja
- Radivoj Knežević as Johnny
- Srdjan Jovanović as Maks
- Ivan Djordjević as Ceca
- Bojan Zogović as Dragan
- Nataša Miljuš as Sofija
- Aleksandar Gligorić as Rade
- Mariana Arandjelović as Darinka
- Srdjan Miletić as Cane

== Reception ==
Critical reception for The Life and Death of a Porno Gang was mixed to positive. DVD Talk recommended the movie overall, but warned that viewers that some of the imagery was "repulsive and horrifying" while also stating that it "never threatens to overwhelm the intelligence, artistry, or humanity at the film's core." Film School Rejects panned The Life and Death of a Porno Gang, commenting that the director "made a scatter-brained film that fails to string together any coherent narrative outside of getting the audience from one distressing image to the next. For a movie so high on its own substance, it is shockingly lacking in any substance whatsoever."

== Release ==
A 107 minutes version of the film was released in January 2019, by TetroVideo.

=== Awards ===
- Special Jury Prize at the Boston Underground Film Festival (2010, won two awards)
- Best Screenplay at the Fant-Asia Film Festival (2010, won)
