= Women Who Rock: Making Scenes, Building Communities Oral History Archive =

Community based in Seattle, established in 2011

- Housed at: University of Washington, Seattle University

Women Who Rock is a discussion forum established in 2008 to encourage dialogue about the portrayal of women in popular music. The community is mostly based in the Seattle area, and its membership includes faculty, students, activists and academics from the University of Washington and Seattle University. The individuals involved in this group introduce and collaborate with artists, musicians, media channels, activists, scholars and students in order to research, discuss and understand the role of women and popular music throughout social scenes and movements.

== Purpose ==
This forum serves as a way to connect the music community and give light to artists who have been lost to time. This community discusses the underlying social constraints that pave the way for some artists while limiting others. They also try to outline the roots of each sound in popular music and give its source recognition.

The University of Washington Libraries Digital Initiatives has hosted the Women Who Rock Digital Oral History Archive since April 2013. The University of Washington works with the Women Who Rock collective by supporting their digital archive and instituting classes on the Seattle campus that represent their ideals. They continue to grow their digital network and data by documentation of scenes collected at their events.

The Women Who Rock collective hosts concerts, interviews, and conferences. They hold an annual unconference & Film Festival that includes music, dance, art and media. They have had notable performers such as Alice Bag, Medusa, Star Evelyn Harris and Christa Bell were featured at their events.

== Building communities ==
The Women Who Rock Archive is based on community outreach and involvement. Over the years the program has partnered with local Seattle communities, including students within and outside the University of Washington. The first collaborating students who helped co-found the project included graduate students from the GWSS Department of the University of Washington who were mentored by Michelle Habell-Pallan and Sonnet Retman, such as: Nicole Robert, Martha González, Rebecca Clark Mane, and Kim Carter Muñoz. Lulu (Luzviminda) Carpenter, an experienced Seattle organizer and head of Urzuri Productions, is a main organizer of the Women Who Rock annual unConference. As a faculty member at Seattle University Mako Fitts Ward ensured that the unConference bridged with women musician, performers and activists in Seattle's hip scene.

Michelle Habell-Pallan and Sonnet Retman co-teach the class known as Rock the Archive: Hip Hop, Indie Rock & New Media, which allows students to study women and African-American involvement in popular music culture. Assignments include blog posts, video critiques, and musical analysis. Each assignment is aimed at a key theme of the project: write to rock, reel rebels, making scenes and building communities. For example, students were able to gain admission to the Museum of History and Industry (MOHAI) and learn about the legacy of Seattle hip-hop. The project has successfully built communities both at the undergraduate and graduate level. Graduate Mentor Workshops are also provided to allow graduate students to present their work in front of a distinguished audience within their respective field and gain critique and feedback.

== Write To Rock ==
Write to Rock is a subunit of the Women Who Rock organization, focusing on the written histories of popular music. It features many music writers, ranging from scholars and critics to journalists and bloggers. With music analysis also ranging across a wide spectrum of genres and music cultures, the group's focuses are to question and criticize previous music histories through a feminist lens, and to re-write these stories in order to include the erased contributions of women and women of color.

The Write to Rock archive, which also contributes to the Women Who Rock's Digital Oral Archive, features biographies and interviews with a number of the individuals who participate with the organization as critical writers. These individuals include: Daphne Brooks, Sherrie Tucker, Maylei Blackwell, María Elena Gaitán, and Deborah Wong.

== Reel Rebels ==
The Women Who Rock Archive also features a number of filmmakers and producers who contribute to the archival and recognition of female artists. The archive has worked with numerous filmmakers including Barni Qaasim, Sheila Jackson, and Karen Whitehead. Recently, they featured a screening of Her Aim Is True, a film biography of Jini Dellaccio, a famous rock photographer. By highlighting media featuring women, the group attempts to promote greater documentation of the achievements made by female artists. In this, they hope to avoid the systemic under-representation of women in music that is historically pervasive. Videos, in the form of oral histories, are one of several methods the Women Who Rock Archive uses to digitally chronicles the stories of female performers, activists, and community leaders.

As of 2015 the Women Who Rock Archive has eleven oral histories, documenting stories by Martha Gonzalez (musician), Medusa, Onion Carillo and several others. Two Women Who Rock media-makers and UW Gender, Women, & Sexuality Studies Phd students, Angelica Macklin and Monica De La Torre worked with UW faculty Michelle Habell-Pallan and Sonnet Retman to design, curate, and produce the digital version of the Women Who Rock Archive. They partnered with UW Libraries Digital Initiative Team Ann Lally, Anne Graham, Angela Rosette-Tavares, and Rinna Rem.

== Making Scenes ==
The Making Scenes aspect represents the Women Who Rock organization's outreach into the local community through events. This allows for community collaboration and dialogue about specific performers and bands. One of the main events this organization holds is an annual conference called the Women Who Rock unConference. Since 2011, this conference has been devoted to women, music, and community building. It has featured various performers including Cholo en Cello, Alice Bag, Medusa, Nobuko Miyamoto, and Quetzal Flores. The conference has been digitally documented every year.

In an article by the Stranger, a weekly alternative arts and culture newspaper, the Women Who Rock unConference in 2012 was compared to the Northwest Women's Show held in the Centurylink's Events Center near Centurylink Field. The two events were so widely distinct in that the “unConference” promoted conversation about the politics of gender, race, class, and sexuality generated by popular music while the Northwest Women's Show focused on dieting, Fitness, Fashion, Wine Tasting, and other aspects. The author pointed out the disparity between the two events and talked about how fulfilling the unConference was and the triviality of the Northwest Women's Show.

== See also ==
- Women of Rock Oral History Project
