= Izzy Lee =

American filmmaker and writer

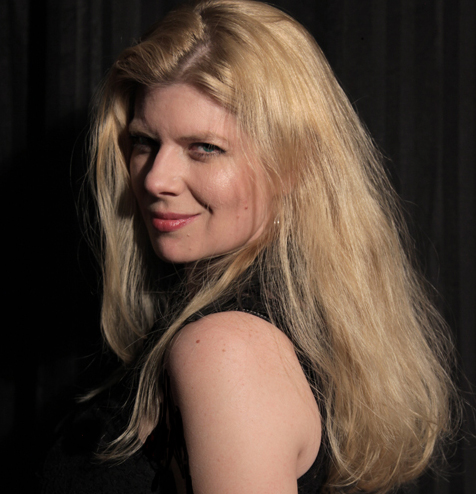
- Lee in 2014
- Education: Massachusetts College of Art and Design
- Occupations: Filmmaker, director, producer, actor, writer

Izzy Lee is an American filmmaker and writer, known for her short films Re-Home (2019), The Obliteration of the Chickens (2019), My Monster (2018), and Innsmouth, which she produced through her company Nihil Noctem. She has written for multiple outlets such as Birth.Movies.Death, Rue Morgue, TwitchFilm, and Fangoria and has also helped program and curate film festivals like the Boston Underground and the Boston Sci-Fi Fest. she also writes fiction.

Lee began showing an interest in horror in kindergarten and later attended the Massachusetts College of Art and Design, where she received a BFA in illustration. She initially started as an actor and writer, but branched out into filmmaking in order to "see if I could do it".

Lee studied filmmaking through Sundance’s films festivals, and started her filmmaking career in Massachusetts. She was first a journalist and copywriter, where she was featured on WCVB Channel 5’s news show, Chronicle. in 2021. Lee has gained a following leading up to articles which shine a light on her talent as an up-and-coming director, such as "one of 10 female horror directors Blumhouse should hire" from The A.V. Club, as well as from author and film festival programmer Alexandra Heller-Nicholas, who stated that "...Izzy Lee... is going to be massive once she gets the break that she deserves" in Entertainment Weekly.

Lee often works with socio-political themes in horror and thrillers, as well as cult or weird genres. Lee's first short film, Legitimate, was released in 2013 and was partially inspired by Representative Todd Akin's comments about "legitimate" rape. The following year, Lee directed a trailer, Come Out and Play, for Christopher Golden's 2014 novel Snowblind. In 2015 Lee released Innsmouth, which was inspired by the works of H. P. Lovecraft, particularly The Shadow over Innsmouth. The short received some media attention for Lee's choice to feature a predominantly female cast, which she did in order to "make [Lovecraft] roll over in his grave a little by having the cast 98% female and switching the gender roles.” Her short film Re-Home (2019) started as a reaction to the promise of a wall built between the United States and Mexico. Lee has also tackled abuse within the Catholic Church with Rites of Vengeance (2017) and revenge porn with For A Good Time, Call... (2017).

In 2023, her short film, Meat Friend starring Marnie McKendry (daughter of fellow horror filmmakers Rebekah and David McKendry), Megan Duffy, and Steve Johanson, was nominated for Best Short by Fangoria for their annual Chainsaw Awards.

The filmmaker often casts other directors in her short films, such as: Gigi Saul Guerrero in Re-Home; Brea Grant and Daniel Isn't Real director, Adam Egypt Mortimer in My Monster; Silvia Graziano and The Ranger producer Heather Buckley in Rites of Vengeance; and Sophia Cacciola in Innsmouth. The author Bracken MacLeod provided the voiceover for the experimental, Werner Herzog-influenced The Obliteration of the Chickens (2019), while Lee herself narrated Disco Graveyard (2020).

Lee's debut feature, House of Ashes, premiered at the Brooklyn Horror Film Festival in 2024.

== Filmography ==
Year	Film	Director	Writer	Producer	Actor	Notes
2013	Legitimate	Yes	Yes	Yes	Yes	Short film, as Masked Woman
2013	Ave Maria	No	No	No	Yes	Short film
2014	Come Out and Play	Yes	Yes	Yes	No	Short film
2014	Picket	Yes	Yes	Yes	No	Short film
2014	Do Not Forsake Me Oh My Darling: Episode 15 - The Girl Who Was Death	No	No	No	Yes	Video short, as Barfly
2015	Bring Us Your Women	Yes	Yes	No	Yes	Segment "Arya Tara", Actress in segment "Sirens", as Persephone
2015	Invisible Friend	Yes	Yes	Yes	No	Short film
2015	A Favor	Yes	Yes	Yes	No	Short film
2015	Innsmouth	Yes	Yes	Yes	Yes	Short film, as Izzy
2015	Postpartum	Yes	Yes	Yes	No	Short film
2016	Grindsploitation	Yes	Yes	No	No	Segment "John Smith"
2016	60 Seconds to Die	Yes	No	No	No	Segment "Necrosis"
2016	Trinity	No	No	No	Yes	as Tarot Card Reader Two
2017	For a Good Time, Call…	Yes	No	Yes	No	Short film, written by Chris Hallock, shot by Bryan McKay, co-produced with Severin Films
2017	Rites of Vengeance	Yes	Yes	Yes	No	Short film, co-produced with Mary McDonagh and Paul Furio
2018	My Monster	Yes	Yes	Yes	No	Short film, co-produced with Richard Stringham
2019	Clickbait	No	No	No	Yes	as Biology 433: Plant Taxonomy and Human Dissection student, Halloween Partier
2019	The Obliteration of the Chickens	Yes	Yes	Yes	No	Short film
2020	Disco Graveyard	Yes	Yes	Yes	Yes	Short film
2020	Consider the Titanic	Yes	Yes	Yes	No	Music Video
2022	Meat Friend	Yes	Yes	Yes	No	Short film
2022	Memento Mori	Yes	Yes	Yes	Yes	Short film
2024	House of Ashes	Yes	Yes	Yes	Yes	Feature film
