= Blood of the Tribades =

2016 American horror film

- Film poster
- Directed by: Sophia Cacciola, Michael J. Epstein
- Screenplay by: Sophia Cacciola, Michael J. Epstein
- Produced by: Sophia Cacciola, Michael J. Epstein
- Starring: Chloé Cunha, Mary Widow, Seth Chatfield, Tymisha 'Tush' Harris, Kristofer Jenson, Zach Pidgeon, Sindy Katrotic
- Cinematography: Sophia Cacciola, Michael J. Epstein
- Edited by: Sophia Cacciola, Michael J. Epstein
- Music by: Night Kisses, Catherine Capozzi, Michael J. Epstein
- Production company: Launch Over
- Release date: March 27, 2016 (Boston Underground Film Festival)
- Country: United States
- Language: English

Blood of the Tribades is a 2016 horror film directed by Sophia Cacciola and Michael J. Epstein. The script, style, and look are heavily influenced by 1970s European lesbian vampire films. The film is distributed in North America on VOD and DVD/Blu-ray by Launch Over and VHS by SRS Media.

== Description ==
Chris Hallock of the Boston Underground Film Festival, where the film had its world premiere on March 27, 2016, calls it, "a love letter to offbeat lesbian vampire films that offers powerful discourse on self-identity, feminism, and the violence wrought from religious dogma".

The film is notable for reversing the typical structure and focus of lesbian vampire films, with ambush bug of Ain't it Cool News noting, "The lesbian vampire is not new in the realm of horror, but whereas in the past, male filmmakers did their best to make lesbianism seem both erotic as well as the outcast other, this film actually makes these vamps sympathetic and shifts gears to change the subject to male oppression versus judgment upon free-spirited feminine wiles".

Starburst's Andrew Marshall examined the film's religious and political allegory in which the words of an ancient religious leader are corrupted over time in order to build favorable power structures: "Through its sex and violence, the film examines the perception of women in an oppressively masculine society, one in which they are taught obedience and complacency, remaining the unwitting victims of theocratic doctrine weaponised by dogmatic fundamentalists. From sapphic symbolism misappropriated by the patriarchal religion to character names representing a disparate assortment of mythologies, the film gradually constructs a culture that could conceivably exist apart from whatever domain may or may not lie beyond the village's borders, while the rampant histrionic misogyny is not only believable within the story's context, but is also rendered all-too plausible by recent real-world developments".

== Plot ==
2000 years after the vampire Bathor established the village of Bathory, superstition and religious conflict take over as the men and women battle for control. When the men are afflicted with a mysterious illness, they become certain that the vampire women of Bathory are responsible for their ills, and thus, the hunt begins! former lovers Élisabeth and Fantine find that, with the help of those who were banished, they attempt to piece together the past and preserve their society before Bathor's return.

== Cast ==
- Chloé Cunha as Élisabeth
- Mary Widow as Fantine
- Seth Chatfield as Grando
- Tymisha 'Tush' Harris as The Great One
- Kristofer Jenson as Sava
- Zach Pidgeon as Berwick
- Sindy Katrotic as Giltine
- Simone de Boudoir as Naga
- Stabatha La Thrills as Wendigo
- Lilith Beest as Nephite Theodosia
- Irina Peligrad as Nephite Geraldine
- Maggie Maraschino as Nephite Ruthven
- Dale Stones as Jacob
- Andrew C. Wiley as Esau
- Savana Petruzello as Darvulia
- Serena Petruzello as Erzsi
- Edrie Edrie as Lilith
- Wednesday Alice Edrie as Baby Aluka
- Aurora Grabill as Carmilla
- Melinda Green as Mircalla
- Hugh Guiney as Stoker
- Scott Dezrah Blinn as Acheron
- Jake Vaughan as Alnwick
- Warren Lynch as Bagdana
- Porcelain Dalya as Akantha
- Shannon Keelan as Hadria
- Rachel Leah Blumenthal as Akeldama
- Tracey Sturtevant as Zillah
- Kevin F. Harrington as Lethe
- Sean M. Kennedy as Cocytus
- Sophia Cacciola as Bathsheba

== Production ==
Funding for the movie was partially raised through a Kickstarter campaign.

== Critical response ==
Blood of the Tribades has received generally positive reviews. Kevan Farrow of Scream gave the film 3.5 out of 5 stars, noting, "Blood of the Tribades is both a pretty and fun piece of offbeat melodrama, and an enraged feminist statement". Andrew Marshall of Starburst gave the film 8 out of 10. Daniel XIII of Famous Monsters of Filmland gave 4 out of 5, noting, "All in all this is one hell of a flick: unique, surreal and chock full of the bloody and beautiful goods that lovers of the Euro-horror genre dig like a grave!"

== Select festivals and awards ==
- Boston Underground Film Festival 2016 (Boston, MA) – World Premiere – Winner Best New England Film
- International Vampire Film and Arts Festival 2016 (Sighisoara, Transylvania, Romania)
- Sanford International Film Festival 2016 (Sanford, ME) – Winner Best Acting (Ensemble), Nominated for: Best Feature Film, Best Cinematography, Best Screenplay, Best Music
- Fantasmagorical Film Festival 2016 (Louisville, KY) – Winner Best ’70s Throwback, Winner Best Vampire Film
- Gen Con 2016 (Indianapolis, IN)
- GenreBlast Film Festival 2016 (Culpeper, VA) – Winner Best Score (Nominated for: Best Sci-Fi/Fantasy Feature, Best Grindhouse/Exploitation, Best Supporting Actor for Seth Chatfield as Grando, Best Screenplay, Best Poster)
- Buffalo Dreams Film Festival 2016 (Williamsville, NY) – Winner BEST RETRO FEATURE (Nominated: Best Horror Feature, Best Screenwriting)
- Fright Night Film Fest 2016 (Louisville, KY)
