= The Droplift Project =

The Droplift Project is a compilation CD of 29 (or 30) tracks created by sound collage artists in July 2000. It was manufactured by the participants and then "droplifted" into chain music stores. This process involved having operatives sneak the CD into stores and file it in regular music racks as if it were regular product. In this way a kind of "reverse shoplifting" results in the artist's work appearing next to legitimate products of the dominant culture. This same process is also known as "shopdropping" in the U.K.

== Project origins ==
The Droplift Project began in 1998 when members of a mailing list called "Snuggles", which was organized to discuss the audio collage art of Negativland, began to trade their own collage works online. Two cassette tape compilations, "The Art/Act of Snuggling" and "Red Hand Dave" preceded the project, but these were limited edition tape trading projects not intended for wider distribution. Discussion online began to steer the group towards creating a CD of tracks, but the concept only came together when Richard Holland recommended the Droplift idea, which he had practiced earlier with his group The Institute of Sonic Ponderance. Holland and his primary collaborator, Robert Cozzolino, deployed "droplifting" of their Institute for Sonic Ponderance CD release, "Gab Binocular Howler Monkey (Op. 1, 1995)" at record stores in Chicago. They started with the Loop location of Tower Records since Holland was then working at the store. Other sites included the Jazz Record Mart and various Chicago independent stores. The two were delighted and knew the tactic had taken root when they found that store employees had tagged the illicit merchandise with price stickers.

== Project operation ==
Under the stewardship of animator and sometime Negativland collaborator Tim Maloney, the tracks were submitted via FTP, collated, mastered, and pressed to CD. Copies were sent all over America as well as some other countries for droplifting. On July 28, 2000, a coordinated effort was made amongst participants to drop the discs in chain record stores as a kind of protest against the music industry and especially the distribution of music at that time. Only 1000 discs were manufactured, but the audio materials, CD packaging, and other materials are still available online.

=== Track listing ===
No.	Title	Recording artist(s)	Length
1.	"Thunderclock"	Tim Maloney	2:35
2.	"Cubicle 38 Droplift Blues"	Turntable Trainwreck	2:13
3.	"Free Will"	Phineas Narco & Ronald Redball	2:41
4.	"Familiar Faces"	The Button	2:34
5.	"Rub My Face"	Reggae Death Squad[tm]	2:34
6.	"Recycled Flashback"	OBE	2:30
7.	"Cute Ass"	Workshoppe Radio Phonik	2:34
8.	"Traitors"	Alamout Black	2:35
9.	"Urgent Day Off"	Chris Ball	2:39
10.	"Blame The Media"	Project Data Control	2:03
11.	"Monkey Business"	Brain Science	2:29
12.	"Let's Play A Game"	Mind	1:58
13.	"Loder Runner [Droplift Flakes]"	Social Security	2:23
14.	"Mr. T Adventure Story"	Bonefish Sam	3:44
15.	"Untitled"	Andy MacMillan	2:32
16.	"Sailor Mom"	Ben Burck	2:41
17.	"Son Of Satan"	EMP+T	2:32
18.	"Long Slow Malcolm"	equatorial	2:15
19.	"Year Of The Rabbit"	The Doom Patrol	2:32
20.	"Ice Teal"	Dad's New Slacks	1:56
21.	"No Need To Fear"	The Cranial Fishers	2:15
22.	"Asshole"	Entropical Utopia	2:34
23.	"Marilyn Hanson Part 2"	Seditious Halibut Media	2:08
24.	"King Brian"	(c)(P)ee	1:31
25.	"Checkmate"	Quiet American	2:32
26.	"Elf Song"	Escape Mechanism	3:01
27.	"Everyone Is Afraid Of Clowns"	Kumquat	2:10
28.	"The Fullest Extent Of The Law"	Stop Children	2:37
29.	"Wannabe [Deconstructive Remix]"	M-Sli©k Da NinjA	2:33
30.	"Bonus Track"	Naked Rabbit	1:28
Total length:			01:12:49
