= Deborah Wong =

American ethnomusicologist

- Born: 1959 (age 66–67)
- Education: University of Michigan (Ph.D., 1991), University of Pennsylvania (BA, 1982)
- Known for: Study of music in Thailand, Asian American music, ethnomusicology and public musicology.
- Scientific career
- Fields: Ethnomusicology, Southeast Asian studies, Asian American studies
- Workplaces: University of California, Riverside
- Thesis: The Empowered Teacher: Ritual, Performance, and Epistemology in Contemporary Bangkok (1991)
- Doctoral advisor: Judith Becker
- Website: Faculty profile

Deborah Anne Wong (born 1959) is an American academic, educator, and ethnomusicologist recognized for her studies of Asian-American and Thai music.

== Early life and education ==
Wong was born on the east coast of the United States and currently resides in California. She earned a Bachelor of Arts in anthropology and music from the University of Pennsylvania in 1982. She later obtained her master's degree and PhD from the University of Michigan, completing her doctoral studies in 1991. She identifies as Chinese-American, Asian-American, and multi-ethnic.

== Scholarship ==
Wong has been a professor of music at the University of California, Riverside since 1996. She previously served as president of the Society for Ethnomusicology, and founded the Committee on the Status of Women with Elizabeth Tolbert in 1996. Wong is also the president of the Board of Directors for the Alliance for California Traditional Arts. She has served on the advisory council for the Smithsonian Center for Folklife and Cultural Heritage since 2011. Wong was nominated to be a member of the National Council on the Humanities by President Barack Obama in December 2015.

== Asian-American studies ==
Wong's research examines Asian-American performance and its intersection with racial dynamics in America. She notes, "Race is very much a part of our lives, America has racist structures that drive it, and looking at race when studying music is a different approach". She used a $10,000 grant from the California Council for the Humanities to help fund the research for the site, www.asianamericanriverside.ucr.edu. She wanted to spread the word about the little-known story of the city's lively Asian community. "Asian American Riverside" is a resource for local schools and the community. The project will help support interethnic understanding and strengthen the community in Riverside.

Wong has studied taiko and is part of Satori Daiko, a performing group in Los Angeles.

== Selected bibliography ==
- Wong, Deborah (2001). Sounding the Center: History and Aesthetics in Thai Buddhist Ritual. Chicago and London: Univ. of Chicago Press. ISBN 0226905853. Wong's first book is about ritual performance and its implications for the cultural politics of Thai court music and dance in Bangkok in the late twentieth-century.
- Wong, Deborah (2004). Speak it Louder: Asian Americans Making Music. New York: Routledge. ISBN 0415970393. This book focuses on music and identity by looking at case studies.

Wong has also published on Chinese-American and Japanese-American jazz, Asian-American hip-hop, and Southeast-Asian immigrant music.

== Research collectives ==
Wong has been a part of the oral history collective project Women Who Rock: Making Scenes, Building Communities.
