= Red Snow (2021 film) =

American horror comedy film

- Promotional poster
- Directed by: Sean Nichols Lynch
- Written by: Sean Nichols Lynch
- Produced by: Alrik Bursell
- Starring: Dennice Cisneros; Nico Bellamy; Laura Kennon; Vernon Wells
- Cinematography: Gavin V. Murray
- Music by: Timothy Lynch
- Distributed by: 4Digital Media (United States)
- Release dates: August 26, 2021 (London Frightfest); December 28, 2021 (United States)
- Running time: 80 minutes
- Country: United States
- Language: English

Red Snow is a 2021 American horror comedy film directed by Sean Nichols Lynch. The film stars Dennice Cisneros as a supernatural romance author living in Lake Tahoe who comes into conflict with vampires over the Christmas holidays. The film had its international premiere at London FrightFest on August 26, 2021 and was released on December 28, 2021.

== Plot ==
Struggling vampire romance novelist Olivia Romo is spending her Christmas holidays alone at her deceased mother's cabin in Lake Tahoe. One night, an injured bat slams against her window. Olivia takes the wounded animal inside her garage to nurse it back to health. The next morning, Olivia is surprised to discover that the bat has transformed into a handsome vampire named Luke.

Olivia stocks up on pig's blood from the local butcher to feed her new house guest and soon the weakened vampire is up on his feet and talking. The unlikely companions get to know each other and start to form a tenuous friendship, but Olivia grows suspicious of Luke's intentions as his past begins to catch up with him.

Vampire hunter Julius King visits Olivia posing as a private investigator and tells her he's looking for a trio of dangerous criminals, one of them being Luke. Olivia covers for Luke, but King sees right through her lies. He attempts to seize Luke by force, only to be killed in the process.

Luke attempts to mend his shaky relationship with Olivia by giving her feedback on her book. Just as he's gotten back into her good graces, his vampire friends Jackie and Brock arrive on the scene, implying that he's strayed too far from his ruthless vampire roots and must kill Olivia.

Jackie and Brock invade Olivia's home on Christmas Eve and Olivia barely escapes with her life in King's abandoned SUV. While the vampires go on a late night killing spree, Olivia learns the horrible truth about Luke's past from King's records. Olivia calls one of King's associates, Simon, who advises her not to attempt to deal with the dangerous vampires herself. Nevertheless, on Christmas morning, Olivia returns to her cabin and fights the vampires, killing Brock and Jackie by impaling them through the heart. Olivia then shoots Luke with a crossbow, seemingly killing him as well.

Ten months later, Olivia is a successful author of vampire fiction. Following a book signing in Los Angeles, Olivia returns to her cabin where she has imprisoned the barely living Luke in her garage, forcing him to be her muse in exchange for blood.

== Cast ==
- Dennice Cisneros as Olivia Romo
- Nico Bellamy as Luke
- Laura Kennon as Jackie
- Vernon Wells as Julius King
- Alan Silva as Brock
- Edward Ewell as Simon

== Production ==
While developing the project, Lynch took inspiration from some of his favorite vampire films such as Fright Night and The Lost Boys. He wrote the characters of Olivia and Luke specifically for Cisneros and Bellamy respectively. Other roles were cast in the San Francisco Bay Area. The film was shot on location in Lake Tahoe over the course of 12 shooting days with an additional day of shooting at a bookstore in Berkeley, California.

== Release ==
The film premiered at Panic Fest, a horror/genre film festival in Kansas City, Missouri, on April 14, 2021. It went on to screen at film festivals around the world throughout 2021, including London FrightFest, New York City Horror Film Festival, GenreBlast, and Buenos Aires Rojo Sangre.

The film was released through various video-on-demand services in the United Kingdom, Ireland, Australia, New Zealand, Sweden, Norway, Denmark, Finland and Korea on December 6, 2021. The film received a DVD and video-on-demand release in the United States on December 28, 2021.

== Reception ==
The film has a 75% approval rating based on 12 critic reviews on Rotten Tomatoes. Martin Unsworth of Starburst rated the film 4/5 stars and praised the performance of Cisneros, saying "her wide-eyed wonder at meeting a real vampire is infectious, and she carries the role beautifully." In a negative review, Cath Clarke of The Guardian criticized the film's comedic tone, saying "it's a black comedy with some silly splattery gore."

The film won both the Audience award and Best Horror/Thriller Feature at the 2021 GenreBlast Film Festival, as well as Best On-Screen Duo for Cisneros and Bellamy. At the Sacramento Horror Film Festival, it won the Best Feature prize while the New York City Horror Film Festival named the film Best Horror Comedy Feature of its 2021 edition. For her performance as Olivia Romo, Cisneros was awarded Best Actress in a Feature Film in the International Competition at Buenos Aires Rojo Sangre in Argentina and the Masque Rouge award for Best Performance at the Portland Horror Film Festival.

== See also ==
- Christmas horror
