= Catherine Capozzi =

Catherine Capozzi is an American rock guitar player, and film composer, best known for her eclectic artistic style. She was named one of Guitar World's "10 Female Guitarists You Should Know" in 2012.

== Early life ==
Capozzi started playing guitar at age 10 at her home in Connecticut before moving to Boston to join rock bands.

== Bands ==
Capozzi was a founding member of Ziaf, a tribute to French singer and cultural icon Édith Piaf. She was also the founder and lead guitarist of the now defunct electronic rock band, All the Queens Men. Her primary current project is the psychedelic instrumental rock outfit, Axemunkee. She also occasionally plays in side projects, including Darling Pet Munkee, a band inspired by items sold in the backs of comic books.

Capozzi also created the multimedia performance piece, Bring Us Your Women, which "looks to share the untold, recontextualized, or reimagined stories of iconic women who have often been overlooked or defined only by their role in the context of men" through music, film, dance, and poetry.

== Film Composing ==
Her film composing work has been done under her name and under a collaboration name, Night Kisses, along with filmmakers Sophia Cacciola and Michael J. Epstein, scoring their films, TEN, Magnetic, Blood of the Tribades, Clickbait, and The Once and Future Smash.
