= Innsmouth (film) =

2015 short horror film by Izzy Lee, inspired by the works of H. P. Lovecraft

- Movie screenshot
- Directed by: Izzy Lee
- Written by: Izzy Lee; Francesco Massaccesi
- Produced by: Izzy Lee; Francesco Massaccesi
- Starring: Diana Porter; Tristan Risk; Izzy Lee
- Cinematography: Bryan McKay
- Edited by: Corey Norman
- Music by: Timothy Fife
- Production company: Nihil Noctem Films
- Release date: August 19, 2015
- Running time: 11 minutes
- Country: United States
- Language: English

Innsmouth is a 2015 short horror film that was directed by Izzy Lee, who co-wrote and co-produced the film with Francesco Massaccesi. The film premiered on August 19, 2015 and is inspired by the works of H. P. Lovecraft, particularly The Shadow over Innsmouth.

The film received attention for its predominantly female cast, as many of Lovecraft's works tended to feature predominantly or solely male characters. Of this, Lee stated that "Innsmouth was created to make Lovecraft roll over in his grave a little by having the cast 98% female and switching the gender roles.”

== Synopsis ==
Detective Olmstead has arrived on a peculiar crime scene, with a body that has both a bite wound and an egg sac on her back. Her only clue is a photograph of the victim with a strange woman. Olmstead manages to determine that the photograph was taken in Innsmouth and travels there in search of answers, which causes her to cross paths with Alice Marsh.

== Cast ==
- Diana Porter as Detective Olmstead
- Tristan Risk as Alice Marsh
- Izzy Lee as Izzy
- Sophia Cacciola as Body
- Vera Schränkung as Henchwoman #1
- Porcelain Dalya as Henchwoman #2
- J. Zocalo as Cop #1
- Phil Healy as Cop #2

== Reception ==
Critical reception for the short has been positive and many outlets such as Rue Morgue praised Risk's acting and character. Dread Central complimented the film for "stick[ing] to the Lovecraftian legend and even has tons of the details of the town correct, right down to the year it was founded and the last name of Marsh, which was a critical moniker in the Innsmouth of the Lovecraftian universe." Starburst also praised Risk's role in the movie and commented that they wished that it had been longer, "as the mythology of the original novella could have been explored even further." Diabolique magazine commented that the film was "Lee’s most striking work. While she has collaborated with cinematographer Bryan McKay before, Innsmouth is by far and away their best joint effort." Icons of Fright's review was also positive, stating that Innsmouth "is exactly what short films should be: a glimpse of the talent behind the filmmaker and their stars, a story that leaves you wanting more, in the best of ways."

=== Awards ===
- Best Short Screenplay at Monster Fest (2015, won)
- Best Supporting Actress at Vancouver Badass Short FF (2016, won - Tristan Risk)
- Best Short at GenreBlast Film Festival 2016
