= Michelle Habell-Pallán =

Feminist Theorist

Michelle Habell-Pallán is a scholar whose works primarily focuses on Latina/o and Chicana/o cultural studies, feminist media studies, and transnational feminist theory. Michelle's works frequently explore the intersection between Chicana/Latina feminist thoughts with queer thoughts and audiovisual medias. Many of her published works explore the contribution of Chicana and Latina artist that challenge traditional gender and racial boundaries. In addition to being a scholar, she is a community activist and leader that brings together scholars, musicians, artist, and other activist on projects that explore the role of women in culture and social justice movements.

== Personal life ==
=== Early life education ===
Habell-Pallán obtained a Ph.D. in American Literature and Cultural Studies from University of California, Santa Cruz in 1997 and a M.A in American Literature

=== Career ===
Habell-Pallán is currently a full time-professor in the Gender, Women, and Sexuality Studies Department in the University of Washington and an adjunct professor in the school of Communication and Music.

== Works ==
=== Women Who Rock ===
Women Who Rock is an oral history archive that explores the role of women in the curation of cultural scenes and social justice movements in the Americas and around the world. It compiles interviews and archival footages of performers, scholars, artist and activist on its official website. Its primary purpose is to engage in community building, film and media production, and the archive of music and media.

=== Loca Motion and The Travels of Chicana and Latina Popular Culture ===
Loca Motion and The Travels of Chicana and Latina Popular Culture(2005) is a book that explores the complexity of culture, linguistics, art, and music in its relation to Chicana and Latina identity. It examines how Chicana and Latina artist subvert traditional boundaries and stereotypes with an emphasis on working-class, queer, and feminist voices that are often excluded from the mainstream. It covers how art and music is a ground for cultural critiques and sociopolitical movements from the perspective of Chicano and Latina artist beyond commodification of their works. The title Loca means "crazy woman" and seeks to reclaim the word in an assertive and empowering manner. The book also explores the works and life of Selena and emphasize the working-class identity of her Mexican-American roots. She emphasize Selena as a transnational icon throughout the Americas and how her identity and work exemplifies defiance against racial and gender expectations while critiquing the commodification of her image and legacy in the mainstream. This book explores how class, sexuality, and gender plays in the role in the cultural production and experiences of Chicano and Latina women. It is a work that examines Chicano/Latina history, intersectionality, and feminist critiques.

=== Latino/a Popular Culture ===
Latino/a Popular Culture is a book edited by Michelle Habell-Pallán and Mary Romero about how Latino/a communities transform and influence the U.S. popular culture in fashion, art, and music. The book examines how the identity of Latino/a in popular culture is not just about representation but an outlet for social change and subvert stereotypes. It critiques the stereotypical representation and image of Latina in popular culture by solely representing them in a sexualized context. The book also brings attention to the idea of "ethnic ambiguity" being a form of marketing power and commodification that hides the elements of assimilation. It asserts that diverse media do not often equate to positive representation and how economics shapes representation of Latinas in the culture.
