= Aleksandar Gligorić =

Serbian actor (born 1973)

- Born: 1973 (age 52–53); Loznica, SR Serbia
- Occupation: Actor
- Known for: Television series "Glavom kroz zid"

Aleksandar Gligorić (Serbian Cyrillic: Александар Глигорић; born 1973) is a Serbian actor known for the television series "Glavom kroz zid" and "Senke nad Balkanom", as well as the films "The Life and Death of a Porno Gang", "Rat uživo", and "Belgrade 011". In 2015, he had a role in the feature The Operative with Anthony LaPaglia.

In 2016, Gligoric also acted in the award winning Serbian film "Train Driver's Diary". Additionally, his acting credits include a role in "The Kujumbura Road", which won a special jury award at the 2016 Belgrade Documentary and Short Film Festival.

As a theater actor, he has had roles in the Belgrade plays "Čovek je čovek" and "Komediji zabune". In 2010, he appeared as himself on the celebrity reality show "Dođi na večeru " (Serbian version of Come Dine with Me).
