= The Hanover House =

- Directed by: Corey Norman
- Written by: Corey Norman, Haley Norman
- Produced by: David Spenlinhauer
- Cinematography: Ken Gonneville
- Edited by: Corey Norman
- Music by: Anthony Lusk-Simone
- Production company: Bonfire Films
- Release date: May 9, 2014 (Dead at the Drive-In)
- Running time: 73 minutes
- Country: United States
- Language: English
- Budget: $23,000

The Hanover House (re-released digitally as The Calling in 2022) is a 2014 horror film that was directed by Corey Norman and is his feature-film directorial debut. The film had its world premiere on May 9, 2014 at the Saco Drive-In. It stars Brian Chamberlain as a man that must deal with the demons from his past before he can move on as an adult.

== Synopsis ==
Robert Foster (Brian Chamberlain) is returning from his father's funeral when he ends up hitting a young girl with his car. Horrified, he quickly goes to the closest farmhouse in hopes of getting medical help for the girl, only for his deceased father to answer the door. There Robert must face the demons of his past before he can finally move on.

== Cast ==
- Brian Chamberlain as Robert Foster
- Casey Turner as Shannon Foster
- Anne Bobby as Martha Hobson
- Olivia Roy as Katie Blake
- Daniel Noel as Jim Foster
- David J. Shaffer as Uncle Fred
- Erik Moody as Charlie Foster
- Shannon Campbell as Ellie Hobson
- Matthew Delamater as John Blake
- Jenny Anastasoff as Patience Blake
- Ian Carlsen as The Priest
- Rick Dalton as The Preacher
- Vanessa Romanoff as Sarah Hall
- Andrew Sawyer as Adam Hall
- Lisa Boucher Hartman as Helena Reese
- Mike Rodway as Young Jim Foster

== Production ==
Filming took place in Maine during December 2012 at various locations, including a farm house that the cast later claimed was haunted. The initial principal photography was funded through a successful Kickstarter campaign and a second fundraiser through Indiegogo was held to raise funding to complete the movie. While filming, Norman was inspired by director and United States fugitive Roman Polanski and Austrian neurologist Sigmund Freud and tried to show these influences in the movie.

== Reception ==
Bloody Disgusting gave the movie a mixed review, stating that they enjoyed the acting and that the film was well crafted, but that it "tromps around the depressing murk a bit too much for [their] tastes".

Horror Hound gave the film a very positive review, stating "The Hanover House is one of the best independent horror films I have ever seen."

== Awards ==
Best Feature Film, Sanford International Film Festival (2014)

Best Feature Film, HorrorHound Weekend Film Festival (2014)

Best Director – Corey Norman, HorrorQuest Film Festival (2014)

Best Actor – Brian Chamberlain, HorrorQuest Film Festival (2014)

Best Maine Film, Sanford International Film Festival (2014)

Runner Up, Best Supernatural Film, Fright Night Film Festival (2014)
