= Assassinaut =

- Directed by: Drew Bolduc
- Written by: Drew Bolduc
- Produced by: Bedhan Ball; Clayton Koski; Michele Lombardi
- Starring: Shannon Hutchinson; Jasmina Parent; Yael Haskal; Johnathan Newport; Vito Trigo; Irene Santiago
- Cinematography: Kunitaro Ohi
- Edited by: Drew Bolduc; Michael Lane
- Music by: Darius Holbert
- Production company: Ultra Fuchsia
- Distributed by: Epic Pictures
- Release date: 30 July 2019
- Running time: 83 minutes
- Country: United States
- Language: English

Assassinaut is a 2019 American science fiction film directed by Drew Bolduc, starring Shannon Hutchinson, Jasmina Parent, Yael Haskal, Johnathan Newport, Vito Trigo, and Irene Santiago.

== Cast ==
- Shannon Hutchinson as Sarah
- Jasmina Parent as Charlie
- Yael Haskal as Brooke
- Johnathan Newport as Tom
- Vito Trigo as Commander
- Irene Santiago as President of the Earth
- Dietrich Teschner as Captain
- Lilly Nelson as Tiberia Bluntknuckle
- Mark Ashworth as The Past President

== Release ==
The film was released on 30 July 2019.

== Reception ==
Bobby LePire of Film Threat gave the film a rating of 7.5/10 and praised the performances, the action and the practical effects.

Oscar Goff of Boston Hassle wrote that while there are "times when it feels like the film almost has too many ideas", and the story "perhaps could have weathered an additional draft", the film "captures the spirit of derring-do that that implies", it "never wears out its welcome", and "each development is followed by another at just the right clip."

Ed Fortune of Starburst rated the film 3 stars out of 10 and wrote that it was "a waste of time for everyone involved and should be avoided", but praised the practical effects and called it a "solid showreel for the talent involved."
