= Boston Underground Film Festival =

- Industry: film-exhibition
- Founded: 1998
- Founder: David Kleiler
- Headquarters: Boston, United States of America
- Key people: Kevin Monahan (Artistic Director) Nicole McControversy (Director of Programming) Bryan McKay (Media Director)
- Website: bostonunderground.org

The Boston Underground Film Festival (BUFF) is an annual event held in the Boston area that specializes in alternative film and video. BUFF is the largest underground film festival in New England, spotlighting short films and feature-length films that would not otherwise find an audience. It was the only film festival in the world to give an award for "Most Effectively Offensive" films, an accolade it awarded from its inception until 2017; on the festival's twentieth anniversary, the award was retired and replaced with "Best First Feature Film," marking a shifting focus towards celebrating new voices in filmmaking.

Despite the festival's title, BUFF has not taken place in Boston proper since 2003. The 2004 festival was held mainly in Arlington, Massachusetts. In 2005, BUFF was held entirely in Somerville, Massachusetts. From 2006 on, BUFF has taken place entirely in Cambridge, Massachusetts.

Although BUFF, as an organization, has hosted year round programming at various Boston venues (such as Space 242 in the South End, The Savant Project (now defunct) in Mission Hill and the Milky Way Lounge in Jamaica Plain), there seem to be no current plans to hold the festival in the City of Boston. Starting in 2016, the festival expanded operations to include a monthly screening series called Dispatches from the Underground at the Somerville Theatre Microcinema. The series screens "the ones that got away," highlighting films that weren't selected for the official festival, as well as occasional repertory titles and guest curated programs from other New England festivals, as well as traveling festivals.

BUFF is one of the longest continuously-running underground film festivals in the world, second only to Chicago Underground Film Festival.

== Recognition ==
BUFF was listed as one of MovieMaker Magazine's "World's 50 Best Genre Festivals" in 2021 as well as one of Dread Central's "Best Horror Festivals in the World" in 2021.

BUFF was named one of MovieMaker Magazine's "Bloody Best Genre Fests in the World" in 2019. Following the 2018 festival, BUFF was recognized on Boston Magazine's Best of Boston 2018 list as Best Film Festival and received a special commendation at the Boston Society of Film Critics' 2018 Special Awards.

The festival received DigBoston's DIGTHIS! Award in 2014 and 2015 for Best Film Festival.

== History ==
Started in 1998, by film professor/curator David Kleiler, BUFF was an extension of an all night film marathon produced by Kleiler and Dima Ballin. The First Annual Boston Underground Film Festival took place in February 1999 at the now defunct Revolving Museum in South Boston. Described by programmer Bernard Broginart as "a wonderful hoax of a film festival," the first BUFF was an extremely informal event. Patrons were encouraged to wander from room to room for a single ticket price in the art gallery converted to a cinema. This format was continued for the 2000 festival.

In the years following, BUFF has adopted a more traditional festival format with set screening start times and using actual cinemas and screening rooms. Between 2001 and 2004, BUFF had expanded and contracted with no central location or venue and no set duration. The festival took place during the month of February from 1999 to 2002. In 2003, it was moved to October; then to May in 2004. During this period, numerous venues housed BUFF screenings, including the Milky Way Lounge in Jamaica Plain, The Allston Cinema Underground (now defunct), The Arlington Regent Theatre, and the Brattle Theatre.

By 2005, BUFF was under new management, with Anna Feder and Kevin Monahan taking over as co-managing directors and bringing on Bryan McKay as graphic designer. David Kleiler retained Executive Director duties this year. One of Feder and Monahan's first actions was to feature the Bacchus bunny front and center by using McKay's striking designs. They also centralized operations during this year, with all screenings taking place at the Somerville Theatre in Davis Square. In 2006 they made Harvard Square BUFF's new home, using the Brattle Theatre as the primary venue. The Brattle also hosted the festival in 2007 and 2008. Kleiler stepped down as Executive Director after the 2006 festival.

According to BUFF's website, the 2009 festival was held at the Kendall Square Cinema and the Brattle Theatre, both in Cambridge. The 2010 and 2011 festivals were held exclusively at the Kendall Square Cinema.

Anna Feder stepped down as Director after the 2011 festival. As of the 2012 festival, Kevin Monahan and Nicole McControversy stepped up into dual festival director roles as Artistic Director and Director of Programming, respectively, and restructured the festival as an officially registered LLC. The festival's graphic designer, Bryan McKay, was promoted to Media Director in 2012. BUFF is organized by an entirely unpaid, volunteer group of dedicated film fans.

In 2012, BUFF moved back to the Brattle Theatre where it has remained the festival's primary screening venue. The festival also used the Harvard Film Archive as a secondary venue from 2016 to 2018.

BUFF's 22nd annual festival, originally scheduled for March 2020 was postponed due to the COVID-19 pandemic. BUFF was one of the five genre festivals (including Brooklyn Horror Film Festival, North Bend Film Festival, the Overlook Film Festival, and Popcorn Frights) that organized Nightstream, an online film festival, in October 2020. Four feature films and five short programs originally intended for the 22nd BUFF were featured in Nightstream. In 2021, four of the original Nightstream festivals, including BUFF, joined again for another edition of Nightstream in October of that year.

In March 2022, BUFF returned to the Brattle Theatre for its first physical edition since 2019; as a result, the festival held its 22nd edition in 2022.

Monahan, McControversy, and McKay stepped down from running the festival after the festival's 25th edition in 2025.

== The Bacchus Awards ==
Rather than giving cash or trade value prizes for awards, BUFF doles out a trophy in the shape of a demonic black bunny with red eyes; various iterations of the award also had a vibrating feature. The Bacchus Award was incorporated into BUFF in its second year and has since become the official mascot of the festival, a focal point in poster/logo design, and the rationale behind the festival's red/black/white color scheme. "And the bunny goes to..." is the much-anticipated phrase at the award ceremony that closes the festival. A new version of Bacchus, clad in white briefs and clutching a liquor bottle was unveiled for the 2008 festival and designed by Casey A. Riley.

Riley designed an updated version of the award in 2009, featuring a slightly svelter Bacchus wearing a pink bunny suit, clutching a liquor bottle and exhibiting a raised middle-finger. This version of the Bacchus Award remained in use through 2017. As of 2018, a new Bacchus was designed in celebration of the festival's twentieth anniversary. Designed by Jason Rosen of Skinwalker Studios, the latest version of Bacchus is entirely ebony and emphasizes more demonic and occult-suggestive traits.

=== Awards Categories ===
- Audience Choice Award
  - Best of Fest Short
  - Best of Fest Feature
  - Best New England Film
  - Best First Feature (as of 2018)
- Director's Choice (BUFF organizers)
  - Best Feature
  - Best Short
- Former
  - Most Effectively Offensive Award (retired in 2017)

Occasionally awards for Lifetime Achievement and Best Animation are selected as well.

== Notable films featured ==
Main article: List of Boston Underground Film Festival screenings

- I Stand Alone, Gaspar Noé (2001)
- Shucking the Curve, Todd Verow (2001)
- We Sold Our Souls for Rock 'n Roll, Penelope Spheeris (2001)
- Don't Ask Don't Tell, Doug Miles (2002)
- Zero Day, Ben Coccio (2003, Best of Fest winner)
- Horns and Halos, Galinsky/Hawley (2003)
- Dear Pillow, Bryan Poyser (2004, Best of Fest winner)
- Family Portraits: A Trilogy of America, Douglas Buck (2005)
- Graveyard Alive: A Zombie Nurse in Love, Elza Kephart (2005, Best of Fest winner)
- Thundercrack!, Curt McDowell, (2005)
- Stryker, Noam Gonick, (2005)
- A Forked World, Carey Burtt & James DiGiovanna (2005)
- Neighborhood Watch (aka Deadly End), Graeme Whifler (2006)
- The French Guy, Ann Marie Fleming (2006, Best of Fest winner)
- Psychopathia Sexualis, Bret Wood (2006)
- American Stag, Benjamin Meade (2007)
- Dante's Inferno, Sean Meredith (2007)
- Viva, Anna Biller (2007, Best of Fest winner)
- The Hamster Cage, Larry Kent (2007)
- Roman, Angela Bettis (2007)
- La Belle Bête, Karim Hussain (2008, Best of Fest winner)
- The Wizard of Gore, Jeremy Kasten (2008)
- Pop Skull, Adam Wingard (2008)
- Who is KK Downey? Darren Curtis & Pat Kiley (2008)
- Otis, Tony Krantz (2008)
- The Last American Freak Show, Richard Butchins (2009)
- Bad Biology, Frank Henenlotter (2009)
- Deadgirl, Marcel Sarmiento & Gadi Harel (2009)
- Modern Love is Automatic, Zach Clark (2009, Best of Fest winner)
- Mock Up on Mu, Craig Baldwin (2009)
- Morris County, Matthew Garrett (2009)
- Love Exposure, Sion Sono (2010)
- Red White & Blue, Simon Rumley (2010, Best of Fest winner)
- Stuck!, Steve Balderson (2010)
- The Life and Death of a Porno Gang, Mladen Djordjevic (2010)
- Amer, Hélène Cattet & Bruno Forzani (2010)
- Hobo with a Shotgun, Jason Eisener (2011)
- The Woman, Lucky McKee (2011)
- Profane, Usama Alshaibi (2011, Best of Fest winner)
- Frankie in Blunderland, Caleb Emerson (2011)
- Chop, Trent Haaga (2011)
- A Horrible Way to Die, Adam Wingard (2011)
- Helldriver, Yoshihiro Nishimura (2011)
- John Dies at the End, Don Coscarelli (2012)
- Excision, Richard Bates, Jr. (2012)
- Smuggler, Katsuhito Ishii (2012)
- Inside Lara Roxx, Mia Donovan (2012)
- Manborg, Steven Kostanski (2012, Best of Fest winner)
- See You Next Tuesday, Drew Tobia (2013)
- White Reindeer, Zach Clark (2013, Best of Fest winner)
- Crimes Against Humanity, Jerzy Rose (2014, Best of Fest winner)
- Starry Eyes, Dennis Widmyer & Kevin Kölsch (2014)
- Blue Ruin, Jeremy Saulnier (2014)
- My Name is Jonah, Phil Healy & JB Sapienza (2014, Best New England Film)
- The Editor, Adam Brooks & Matthew Kennedy (2015)
- We Are Still Here, Ted Geoheghan (2015)
- I Am a Knife with Legs, Bennett Jones (2015, Best of Fest winner)
- Remedy, Cheyenne Picardo (2015)
- Trash Fire, Richard Bates, Jr. (2016)
- Blood of the Tribades, Sophia Cacciola and Michael J. Epstein (2016)
- A Life In Waves, Brett Whitcomb (2017)
- Dave Made a Maze, Bill Watterson (2017, Audience Award for Best Feature)
- Tigers Are Not Afraid, Issa López (2018, Audience Award for Best Feature)
- Laissez bronzer les cadavres, Hélène Cattet and Bruno Forzani (2018)
- My Name is Myeisha, Gus Krieger (2018, Director's Choice Best Feature)
- Tone-Deaf, Richard Bates, Jr. (2019)
- Hail Satan?, Penny Lane (2019)
- Werewolf, Adrian Panek (2018)
- Industrial Accident: The Story of Wax Trax! Records, Julia Nash (2018)
- Mope, Lucas Heyne (2019)
- Clickbait, Sophia Cacciola and Michael J. Epstein (2019)
- Knife+Heart, Yann Gonzalez (2019)
- Dinner in America, Adam Carter Rehmeier (2020, Nightstream Audience Award)
- Toshie the Nihilist, Matthew Chozick (2021, Best Short Award)
- You Won't Be Alone, Goran Stolevski (2022)
- Nitram, Justin Kurzel (2022)
- The Innocents, Eskil Vogt (2022)
- Watcher, Chloe Okuno (2022, Director's Choice Best Feature)
- Vortex, Gaspar Noé (2022)
- Lux Æterna, Gaspar Noé (2022)
- Hatching, Hanna Bergholm (2022)
- Neptune Frost, Saul Williams and Anisia Uzeyman (2022, Best First Feature)
- Immaculate, Michael Mohan (2024)
- The Ugly Stepsister, Emilie Blichfeldt (2025, Director's Choice Best Feature)
- Obsession, Curry Barker (2026)

== Notable guests ==
- Bill Plympton (2003)
- George A. Romero (2004)
- Douglas Buck (2005)
- Ann Marie Fleming (2006)
- Lloyd Kaufman (2006)
- Angela Bettis (2007)
- Lucky McKee (2007 & 2011)
- Anna Biller (2007)
- Terence Nance (2007)
- Todd Verow (2007)
- Larry Kent (2007)
- Karim Hussain (2008)
- Jeremy Kasten (2008)
- Adam Wingard (2008)
- Steve Balderson (2008–2010)
- Tony Krantz (2008)
- Frank Henenlotter (2009 & 2016)
- George Kuchar (2010)
- Mink Stole (2010)
- Simon Rumley (2010)
- Gorman Bechard (2010)
- Jason Eisener (2011)
- Trent Haaga (2011)
- Caleb Emerson (2011)
- Don Coscarelli (2012)
- John Fasano (2012)
- Richard Bates, Jr. (2012 & 2016)
- Jeremy Saulnier (2014)
- Larry Fessenden (2016)
- Suzanne Ciani (2017)
- Issa López (2018)
- Penny Lane (2019)
- Barbara Crampton (2025)
- Bob Odenkirk (2026)
