= Corey Norman (director) =

American horror film director and writer (born 1981)

- Born: March 19, 1981 (age 45); Bridgton, ME
- Occupations: Director, producer, writer
- Years active: 2000 - present
- Organization: Bonfire Films
- Known for: The Hanover House
- Spouse: Haley Norman
- Awards: Best Director (HorrorQuest), Best Director (Horror Society Awards 2016), Best Maine Filmmaker (Portland Phoenix Best of Awards)

Corey Norman (born March 19, 1981) is an American horror film director and writer, best known for his debut feature film, The Hanover House. The film has won 6 awards, including Best Feature Film (HorrorHound Film Festival) and Best Director (HorrorQuest Film Festival). It is slated for worldwide distribution in fall 2015.

== Career ==
Norman begin working in the film industry at the age of 19 for the Lone Wolf Documentary Group, where he worked for clients such as: History Channel, Nova, National Geographic Channel and Discovery Channel. He was an assistant editor on Nova’s "Bioterror", produced in conjunction with The New York Times, which won a Best News and Documentary Emmy Award. He would continue working in documentary based television for seven years before pursuing his career as a horror filmmaker.

== The Hanover House ==
Norman's first feature film, co-written with his wife Haley, was The Hanover House. Filming took place in Maine during December 2012 at various locations, including a farm house that the cast later claimed was haunted. The initial principal photography was funded through a successful Kickstarter campaign and a second fundraiser through Indiegogo was held to raise funding to complete the movie. The film would go on to premiere at The Saco Drive-In on May 9, 2014.

The film will be re-released digitally under the title "The Calling" in 2022.

== Short films ==
=== NATAL ===
In the summer of 2014, Norman and his wife penned NATAL, a thirty-minute, slow burn horror film. It premiered at Maine's Damnationland Film Festival, an annual showcase of home grown horror films held at the historic State Theatre. NATAL was nominated for 10 awards, winning both Best Supernatural Short and Best Actress at the Fear Fete Horror Film Festival in 2014. NATAL will see worldwide distribution on October 6, 2015 as part of The Invoking 2, an anthology film released by RJL/Image Entertainment.

=== Tickle ===
Written in 2014 by Corey's wife Haley, Tickle is a throwback to the golden era of VHS horror. Directed by Norman and filmed over the course of several nights, it premiered as part of Damnationland in October 2014. Since its premiere, it has won Best Short Film at the Crimson Screen Horror Film Festival, and listed at an official selection at 50 separate festivals, garnering 20 award nominations. The short was licensed for international distribution by Shorts HD in 2015.

=== Suffer the Little Children ===
In 2015, Norman was granted the rights to produce Stephen King's short story "Suffer the Little Children." The project will begin filming in July 2015 and will mark the second time that Norman has worked with actress Anne Bobby. The film is set to premiere at HorrorHound Indianapolis this September.

== Music videos ==
In 2011, Norman began directing music videos, beginning with Last Chance to Reason's "Upload Complete." In response to the video's release of their web site, MetalSucks stated: "(This is) proof you can make an engaging music video for a small amount of dough." In 2013, he would direct "The Escapist," the first single from Last Chance to Reason's third studio album. It premiered August 6, 2013 on Alternative Press. In 2014, Norman would direct two music videos for Indiana-based progressive metal band The Contortionist. The first video, "Language I: Intuition" debuted on August 26, 2014 on Alternative Press. The video received positive reviews, with the website Metal Injection stating, "The Contortionist's new music video is as beautiful as the song it accompanies." Norman's second directorial effort for the band, "Primordial Sound," would later be released through Vice's Noisey website, and depicts the band in an ultra minimalist, stripped down state.

== Additional awards ==
In 2011, Norman was honored as one of Maine Today Media’s “Forty Under 40,” for being one of the most influential people in the state of Maine under the age of 40. He was named Runner Up for Educator of the Year by ACTEM in 2014, and Best Maine Filmmaker by the Portland Phoenix in 2015
