= The Deeper You Dig =

2019 film directed by Toby Poser and John Adams

- Film poster
- Directed by: Toby Poser; John Adams; Zelda Adams
- Written by: Toby Poser; John Adams
- Starring: Toby Poser; John Adams
- Production company: Wonder Wheel Productions
- Distributed by: Dark Sky Films
- Release date: 2019
- Running time: 95 minutes
- Country: United States
- Language: English

The Deeper You Dig is a 2019 horror drama film written and directed by Toby Poser and John Adams, and co-directed by Zelda Adams. It stars Toby Poser, Zelda Adams, John Adams, and Shawn Wilson. The film follows a series of events that take place after a drunk man accidentally hits a girl with his vehicle.

== Cast ==
- Toby Poser as Ivy
- Zelda Adams as Echo
- John Adams as Kurt
- Shawn Wilson as Dell

== Release ==
The Deeper You Dig premiered in Canada at the 2019 Fantasia Film Festival. It premiered in the United States as part of Fantastic Fest.

=== Critical reception ===
On the review aggregator website Rotten Tomatoes, 94% of 31 critics' reviews are positive. On Metacritic, the film has a weighted average score of 75 out of 100 based on 6 critics, which the site labels as "generally favorable" reviews.

Richard Whittaker of The Austin Chronicle commented that "The Deeper You Dig may be a small production, but everything in it feels aspirational, so much bigger and heartfelt and horrifying than can be expected." Nick Allen, writing for RogerEbert.com, said that the film is "sometimes too distancing", though nevertheless "creates an impressive cinematic quality with the very basic tools of filmmaking." Lorry Kikta of Film Threat gave the film a positive review, calling it "one of the more fascinating explorations of psychic activity and hauntings that I’ve seen in quite some time."
