= Sophia Cacciola =

American film director

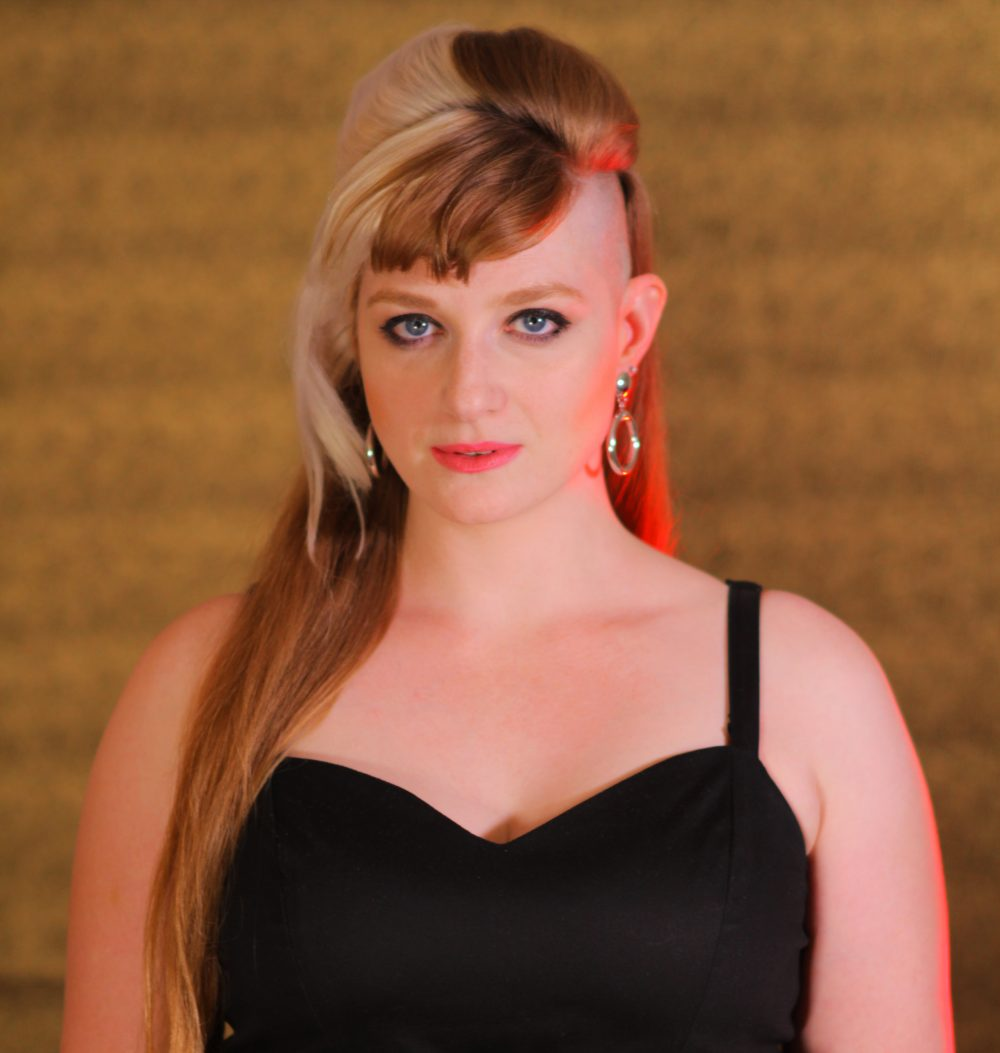
- Occupations: Filmmaker, artist, musician
- Known for: Blood of the Tribades, TEN, Clickbait, Magnetic

Sophia Cacciola is an American filmmaker, artist, and musician.

== Career overview ==
=== Film ===
Cacciola is known for her sociopolitical genre feature films that showcase women: TEN, Magnetic, Blood of the Tribades, Clickbait, and The Once and Future Smash. Her films have received festival awards including Boston Underground Film Festival's "Best New England Film", the Buffalo Dreams Fantastic Film Festival "Best Retro" award, and GenreBlast Film Festival "Best Score". Cacciola was the recipient of the 2018 GenreBlast Film Festival "Les Femmes Du Genre" wrestling belt award for her work in the community, directing, producing, and cinematography and the "Nuclear Pen" award for outstanding screenwriting achievements. She also received the Lois Weber award at the 2018 Buffalo Dreams Fantastic Film Festival. In 2022, Cacciola was the winner of the Innovation in Film award at Nightmares Film Festival along with her partner, Michael J. Epstein.

Cacciola's filmmaking interests were summarized as, "I love horror because you can be very bold about inserting themes and sociopolitical commentary and still make an entertaining movie. The possibilities are unlimited. You can create a whole world and mythology. Horror fans are incredibly engaged and loyal, so it’s really possible to build an incredible community of like-minded people to work with and to champion the films."

In addition to producing and directing films, Cacciola is also a cinematographer, working on narrative film as well as being the head shooter for the Women of Rock Oral History Project.

Cacciola also often collaborates with other filmmakers including: Michael J. Epstein and Izzy Lee.

=== Music ===
Cacciola often blends her film and music work, noting in an interview the book, Indie Science Fiction Cinema Today: Conversations with 21st Century Filmmakers: "I come from a rock'n'roll music background, where an independent DIY ethic is very ingrained, so I've always just charged in where I don't belong and done what I wanted."

Cacciola drums and sings for The Prisoner-themed "loud, arty, minimalist rock working in the realm of proto-punk/new wave/no wave" band, Do Not Forsake Me Oh My Darling, which won a best video award from TIME in 2011. The Boston Globe wrote: "the songs deal with troubled states of mind — fear, paranoia, claustrophobia — and the distinct feeling that, yes, they are out to get you. In other words, the harrowing music that marks “The New Number 2’’ is in keeping with the premise of The Prisoner: a former British secret agent held captive by unseen forces with an unknown agenda in a mysterious village."

Her musical career also includes stints with the children's rock band, Space Balloons, garage punks Darling Pet Munkee, and indie ensemble The Michael J. Epstein Memorial Library.

=== Art ===
She was awarded an art residency at Museumsquartier in Vienna, Austria in autumn 2017. She created Nothen für die Tothen, an interactive music art installation for Roboexotica.

== Politics ==
Cacciola identifies as a feminist activist. In an article published by Quartz she addresses the problem that in today's film industry women can't rise when men overwhelmingly promote other men: "The only way I see any of this changing is to put multiple women at the top with firing power."

== Personal life ==
Cacciola is married to filmmaker, artist, and frequent collaborator, Michael J. Epstein.

== Selected filmography ==
Year	Film	Director	Writer	Producer	Actor	Cinematographer	Notes
2023	Craving	No	No	No	No	Yes	
2022	The Once and Future Smash	Yes	No	Yes	Yes	Yes	
2021	The Transformations of the Transformations of the Drs. Jenkins	Yes	Yes	Yes	Yes	Yes	
2018	Clickbait	Yes	No	Yes	Yes	No	
2017	Hipster Ghost	Yes	Yes	Yes	Yes	Yes	
2017	Grindsploitation 2: The Lost Reels	Yes	Yes	Yes	Yes	Yes	
2017	Blood of the Tribades	Yes	Yes	Yes	Yes	Yes	
2016	Weekend Vampire	Yes	Yes	Yes	Yes	Yes	
2015	Innsmouth	No	No	No	Yes	No	
2015	Magnetic	Yes	Yes	Yes	No	No	
2014	TEN	Yes	Yes	Yes	Yes	No	
2013	Wake No More	No	No	Yes	Yes	No	
2013	Fat	No	No	No	Yes	No	
2011	Quiet Desperation	No	No	No	Yes	No	
