= Matthew Chozick =

American tarento

- Born: December 1, 1980 (age 45); Connecticut, U.S.
- Occupations: TV personality, actor, writer, scholar, filmmaker
- Website: www.matthewchozick.com

Matthew Chozick (Japanese: マシュー・チョジック) is an American TV personality, actor, writer, filmmaker, and scholar in Japan.

== Career ==
Since April 2012, Chozick has starred weekly with Takeshi Kitano on Nippon TV's Sekai marumie! Terebi tokusôbu, one of Japan's most popular comedy-variety shows. In addition to TV work, Chozick is known for acting in multiple films of Japan Academy Award-winning director Eiji Uchida, for co-hosting a popular show on NHK Radio, and for his writing in Japanese and English. He also teaches at Temple University Japan Campus and has lectured at other universities in the US, UK, and Japan.

Chozick's directorial debut, Toshie the Nihilist, garnered numerous awards after premiering at the Academy Award and BAFTA qualifying LA Shorts International Film Festival in 2021. That same year, Chozick also appeared in Sion Sono's Prisoners of the Ghostland, which premiered at Sundance Film Festival.

According to comments in several media interviews, Chozick is currently in post-production on a Japanese feature film he directed and wrote.

In 2026, Chozick's short film Civilization and Its Discontents was selected for exhibition at the National Art Center, Tokyo, as part of the 82nd Art Festival Genten, where it was recognized with a kaiyū honor.

Aside from creative work and teaching, Chozick publishes academic research in the fields of comparative literature, cultural studies, and translation theory. He has also edited, written, and translated several books. Chozick earned a PhD in the UK at the University of Birmingham and studied method acting in Los Angeles at the Lee Strasberg Theatre and Film Institute. He has also trained in New York at the Barrow Group.

== Television Work ==
Year	Title	Network	Role	Notes
2012–present	Sekai marumie! Terebi tokusôbu	Nippon Television	Himself	Weekly segment host
2014	Nippon sengo sabukaruchā-shi	NHK	Himself	Show won Galaxy Award (Japan)
2016–present	Hiruobi	TBS Television (Japan)	Himself	Commentator
2020	Perfect I Nogizaka Cinemas Story of 46	Fuji Television	Evil Tech Guru	
2021–present	Smitten in Japan	NHK	Himself	Host
2022–present	Ethical Every Day	NHK	Himself	Co-host

== Filmography ==
Year	Title	Role	Notes
2017	Love and Other Cults	Ravi	
2019	Jebiotto vs. Mechajebiotto	God	
2020	Midnight Swan	Announcer (voice)	Film won Japan Academy Film Prize for Picture of the Year
2021	Prisoners of the Ghostland	Sheriff Matthew	
2021	Toshie the Nihilist	Anh Dung	Also writer and director. For a list of honors, see Movie awards and nominations.
2022	Offbeat Cops	Town Priest	
2024	Light of Intricate Patterns	Michael Brown	
2025	Fiamma		

== Movie awards and nominations ==
Awards and nominations received by Matthew Chozick
Award	Year	Work	Category	Result	Ref(s)
New York Shorts International Film Festival	2021	Toshie the Nihilist (wrote and directed)	Best Comedy Award	Won	
Sydney Underground Film Festival	2021	Toshie the Nihilist (wrote and directed)	Audience Choice Award	Won	
Burbank International Film Festival	2021	Toshie the Nihilist (wrote and directed)	Best Foreign Short	Nominated	
Shenzhen International Film Festival	2021	Toshie the Nihilist (wrote and directed)	Best Visual Award	Won	
Hong Kong International Short Film Festival	2021	Toshie the Nihilist (wrote and directed)	Most Promising Director	Won	
Mediterranean Film Festival Cannes	2021	Toshie the Nihilist (wrote and directed)	Best Comedy Short Film	Won	
Boston Underground Film Festival	2022	Toshie the Nihilist (wrote and directed)	Best Short Film	Won	
New York City International Film Festival	2022	Toshie the Nihilist (wrote and directed)	Best International Short Film	Won	
