= Women of Rock Oral History Project =

- Housed at: Smith College
- Website: WomenOfRock.org

Women of Rock Oral History Project is an oral history project based at Smith College focusing on American women and gender non-conforming, LGBT, and feminist rock and roll and punk music musicians from the 1970s to the present.

== History ==
The Women of Rock Oral History project was started in December 2014 as a collection of digital video interviews conducted by Smith College Ada Comstock scholar and archivist, Tanya Pearson.

The inspiration for the project came from a seminar on censorship in the United States Pearson took while at Smith, where she worked as an assistant archivist at the Sophia Smith Collection while completing an undergraduate degree in American Studies with concentrations in oral history and archives. For the seminar, Pearson wrote about women rockers from the 1990s. During the process she was discouraged at the difficulty of finding widely available information about musicians she needed to find source material on, illustrating the fact that bands like L7 were not covered in detail in rock and roll history. Thematic devices she saw seemed to devalue their music and their musicianship, where the musicians were subject to sexism and tokenism, especially in popular journalism. The project highlights the limitations and bias within music scholarship and journalism. Many of the musicians were also active pre-internet, where press and coverage weren't available online and are not digitized.

The project includes written transcripts and is housed at the Sophia Smith Collection at Smith College. The scope of the project is to document the influence and history of women in rock and roll, and to bring focus to the unheralded role of women musicians.

=== Methods ===
The digital interviews with the musicians is the core focus of the project. Nina Gordon and Louise Post, who make up Veruca Salt, were the first band and musicians that were interviewed. The interviews include biographies of their lives and their work as musicians. A portion of each interview includes what it was like to work as a musician in the time period that they were active as well as their experiences in the current day.

As a supplemental part of the project, the Women of Rock Oral History Project has conducted panels and roundtable discussions often with some of the subjects of the interviews to discuss issues of gender gap and challenges women face in the music industry.

Pearson has also organized concerts, local shows, and events in support of the grassroots project, which often includes performances by subjects of the oral histories. As part of these performances, another component of the project is addressing gender bias on Wikipedia and its coverage of women and gender non-conforming musicians by holding strategy discussions and Wikipedia editathons.

=== Funding ===
The project has been funded by a Rosenthal Fund grant from Smith College and a Helen Gurley Brown Magic Grant awarded to Ada Comstock Scholars.

== Collection ==
The project includes over 20 underrepresented female musicians from various rock and roll and punk music bands that were active from the 1970s to 2010, with some musicians and bands still actively performing music. Bands are listed next to each subject below. Each musician participated in video interviews which were digitized and made available on Vimeo. There are over 29 videos that are part of the project. A corresponding transcription project corresponding to the videos is in process of being created.

The timeframe of the project is from December 2014 to the present. The collection is ongoing, with additional video interviews being conducted. Pearson has said that the priority of subjects is on women musicians from the 1960s and 1970s, in an effort to capture their stories before their stories are lost. A book that focuses on the stories of pioneering women musicians in rock is planned.

Listed alphabetically

- Alice Bag – Bags, Castration Squad, Stay at Home Bomb, Cholita!
- Alice de Buhr – Fanny
- Allison Wolfe – Bratmobile
- Amanda Palmer – The Dresden Dolls, Evelyn Evelyn, Amanda Palmer and the Grand Theft Orchestra
- Azalia Snail – LoveyDove
- Bibbe Hansen – The Whippets, Black Fag
- Brenda Lee
- Brie (Howard) Darling – The Svelts, Fanny
- Carla Bozulich – Ethel Meatplow, Geraldine Fibbers, Scarnella
- Cherie Currie – The Runaways
- Cindy Wilson – The B-52's
- Cynthia Ross – The B-Girls
- Donita Sparks – L7
- Eljuri
- Eva Gardner – Gwen Stefani, Pink, Cher, The Mars Volta, Veruca Salt, Tegan and Sara
- Exene Cervenka – X
- Freda Payne
- Gail Ann Dorsey – David Bowie
- Genya Ravan – The Escorts, Goldie & the Gingerbreads, Ten Wheel Drive
- Ginger Bianco – Goldie and the Gingerbreads, Isis
- Ginger Coyote – White Trash Debutantes, Punk Globe
- JD Samson – Le Tigre, DJ project MEN
- Jean Millington – Fanny
- Josephine Wiggs – The Breeders
- Jula Bell – Bulimia Banquet, Bobsled
- Julie Cafritz – Pussy Galore, STP, Free Kitten
- Kat Arthur – Legal Weapon
- Kate Pierson – The B-52's
- Kate Schellenbach – Luscious Jackson, Beastie Boys
- Kira Roessler – Black Flag, Dos
- Kristin Hersh – Throwing Muses, 50 Foot Wave
- Laura Ballance – Superchunk
- Louise Post – Veruca Salt
- Lydia Lunch – Teenage Jesus and the Jerks, Eight Eyed Spy, Beirut Slump
- Mary Timony – Autoclave, Helium, Wild Flag, Ex Hex
- Melissa Auf der Maur – Hole, The Smashing Pumpkins, Tinker
- Michelle Cruz Gonzales – Bitch Fight, Spitboy, Instant Girl
- Mish Barber-Way – White Lung
- Miss Guy – Toilet Böys
- Neon Music
- Nina Gordon – Veruca Salt
- Pat Place
- Patty Schemel – Hole, Upset
- Phranc
- Sherry Rayn Barnett – The Mustangs
- Shirley Manson – Garbage, Angelfish, Goodbye Mr Mackenzie
- Tanya Donelly – Throwing Muses, The Breeders
- Terri Nunn – Berlin
- Thalia Zedek – Come
- Toody Cole
- Tracy Bonham
- Veruca Salt
- Viola Smith – Smith Sisters Orchestra, The Coquettes, Phil Spitalny's Hour of Charm Orchestra, Viola and her Seventeen Drums

== See also ==
- Women Who Rock: Making Scenes, Building Communities Oral History Archive
