= Clickbait (film) =

2018 social satire horror film by Sophia Cacciola and Michael J. Epstein

- Directed by: Sophia Cacciola; Michael J. Epstein
- Written by: Jeremy Long; Michael J. Epstein
- Produced by: Sophia Cacciola; Michael J. Epstein
- Starring: Amanda Colby Stewart; Brandi Aguilar; Seth Chatfield; Ryan James Hilt; Cedric Jonathan; Makeda Kumasi; Jannica Olin; Johannes Grenzfurthner; Sarah Paterson; Sophia Cacciola; Brittnee Hollenbach; Lianne O'Shea; Michael J. Epstein; Matt Stuertz; Jill Galbraith
- Cinematography: Matt Stuertz; Paul Zurcher
- Edited by: Sophia Cacciola; Michael J. Epstein
- Music by: Night Kisses; Catherine Capozzi; Michael J. Epstein; Sophia Cacciola
- Production company: Launch Over
- Release date: August 2018 (GenreBlast Film Festival)
- Running time: 80 minutes
- Country: United States
- Language: English

Clickbait is a 2018 social satire horror film directed by Sophia Cacciola and Michael J. Epstein. The film is an exploration of the pressures on people to have performative identities and to seek popularity. The film satirizes not only social media, but the way in which social media is used to sell advertising for mundane products, specifically the invented radioactive toaster pastry, Toot Strudels.

The film won the award for "Best Feature" at the Starburst 2019 Fantasy Film Awards.

== Plot ==
A popular vlogger, Bailey, is upset when she loses her status on vlogging site, str33ker.com, to a competing creator who is diagnosed with cancer. When Bailey starts getting stalked, her popularity rises again, and she is not so eager to have the crime solved. With incompetent police detective Dobson assigned to the case, the culprit will probably not be caught.

== Description ==
Daniel XIII of Horror Fuel says that Clickbait is, "a horror comedy that takes the horror part seriously, along with a heaping helpin' of surreal visuals, pointed commentary, and toaster pastries." Andrew Marshall of Starburst noted the film's audience-focused themes calling the film, "a scathing observation of the habits of the internet age, Clickbait asks us to take a hard look at our online viewing habits and the true reasons for our enjoyment of the darker things that appeal to us, and demands we truly consider the kinds of things we might be inadvertently complicit in."

== Cast ==
- Amanda Colby Stewart as Bailey
- Brandi Aguilar as Emma
- Seth Chatfield as Detective Frank Dobson
- Ryan James Hilt as Chase
- Cedric Jonathan as Brayden
- Makeda Kumasi as Professor Vargas
- Jannica Olin as Laura
- Johannes Grenzfurthner as Wolfgang van Tütstrudel
- Sarah Paterson as the living statue
- Sophia Cacciola as Mrs. Wilson
- Brittnee Hollenbach as Toaster Pastry Enthusiast
- Lianne O'Shea as Mike Pence
- Michael J. Epstein as Donald Trump
- Matt Stuertz as Excited Biology 433: Plant Taxonomy and Human Dissection student
- Jill Galbraith as Banana
- Jeremy Long as Pickle

== Production ==
The film went into production in December 2017.

== Reception ==
Clickbait has received generally positive reviews. Daniel XIII of Horror Fuel gave it 5 out of 5 skulls and said, “…a strong undercurrent of biting social commentary presented in a satirical manner. Everything from social media to corporate sponsorship to instant celebrity to the corruption of law enforcement and government is well and duly skewered. But fret not, because while these themes are being explored, there is a true reverence to our beloved horror biz on display as well (especially for the slasher and giallo genres).” Matt Storc of Horror Society noted the film's satirical qualities, giving it a 3.5/5 and saying, "Fans of John Waters and Paul Bartel movies are in for a treat with Clickbait."

== Release ==
Clickbait was released on VOD in North America on June 18, 2019.

== Festivals and awards ==
- GenreBlast Film Festival 2018 (Winchester, VA) - Winner: Best On-Screen Duo (Amanda Colby Stewart and Brandi Aguilar) - Nominated: Best Actress (Amanda Colby Stewart, Brandi Aguilar), Best Score, Best Screenplay, Best Cinematography
- Sanford International Film Festival 2018 (Sanford, ME) - Winner: Best Music - Nominated: Best Feature, Audience Choice Award
- Arizona Underground Film Festival 2018 (Tucson, AZ) - Winner: Best Horror Feature
- FANtastic Horror Film Festival 2018 (San Diego, CA) - Winner: Best Supporting Actress (Brandi Aguilar) - Nominated: Best Actress (Amanda Colby Stewart), Best Supporting Actor (Seth Chatfield), Best Feature, Best Score
- Buffalo Dreams Fantastic Film Festival 2018 (Buffalo, NY) - Winner: Outstanding Micro-Budget Feature - Nominated: Outstanding Horror Feature, Outstanding Comedy Feature, Outstanding Director, Outstanding Screenplay, Outstanding Actress in a Feature (Amanda Colby Stewart)
- Starburst International Film Festival 2019 (Manchester, UK) - Winner: Best Feature
- Boston Underground Film Festival 2019
