= Michael J. Epstein =

American filmmaker

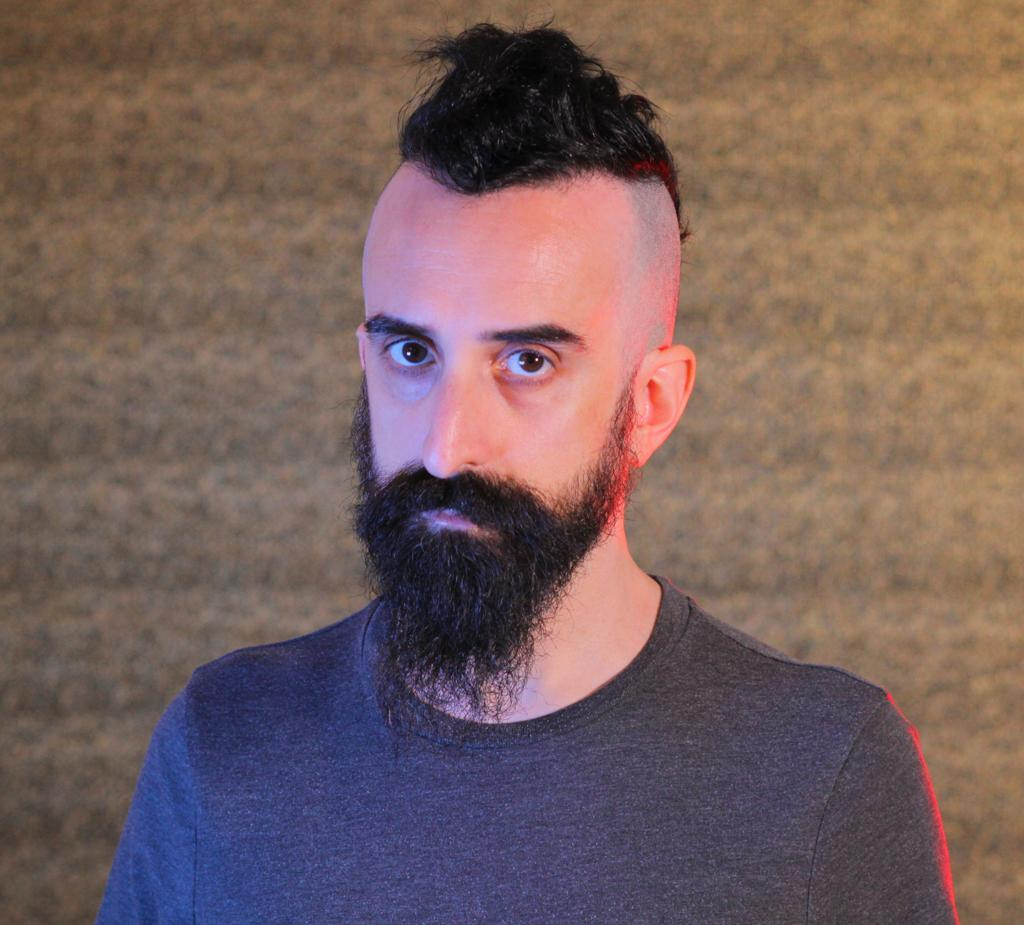
- Born: 1976 (age 49–50); Smithtown, New York, U.S.
- Education: Northeastern University
- Occupations: Artist, filmmaker, writer, actor, songwriter, musician
- Spouse: Sophia Cacciola
- Website: Michael J. Epstein

Michael J. Epstein (born 1976), is an American filmmaker, musician, writer, and auditory scientist. Epstein has also spoken and written about the impact of local media on the arts, music service gatekeeping, effective social networking, and crowdfunding.

== Early life and education ==
Epstein was born in Smithtown, New York. His father is author Lawrence J. Epstein. Epstein grew up in Stony Brook, New York. and was raised Jewish.

Epstein comes from a technical background, but shifted toward creative work, saying he "was building electronics projects and writing adventure games on my VIC-20 in gradeschool... [and] started seeing a lot of commonality between all of this creative work and my more formal training in electrical engineering as my creative skills advanced."

Epstein received a BS in electrical engineering from Binghamton University and a PhD in electrical and computer engineering in 2004 from Northeastern University and joined the audiology faculty there in 2005. Epstein became a tenured professor at the university, studying psychoacoustics, loudness, auditory electrophysiology, and sound design before leaving Boston in 2016 to pursue full-time filmmaking.

== Career ==
=== Film ===
Epstein, in collaboration with his wife, Sophia Cacciola, has directed multiple feature films, including: TEN, Magnetic, Blood of the Tribades, Clickbait, The Transformations of the Transformations of the Drs. Jenkins, and The Once and Future Smash. The pair are focused on creating sociopolitical genre films. Their film Clickbait started playing at festivals in 2018.

Epstein describes his process for creating films as thematic. Discussing his first feature TEN, he noted, "We really wanted to expand typical characterization themes of using shortcuts and stereotypes to touch on the broader narrative of the film. Because the film is about the arbitrary meaninglessness of identity, we wanted to recontextualize the film itself repeatedly by shifting tone and genre." Michael Gingold of Fangoria described TEN saying, "it veers off in directions you likely won't see coming, both in narrative terms and in the way it explores questions of female identity." Lauren Shiro of Curve wrote, "the movie takes on a political and sociological stance, examining stereotypes, identity, and also the subtext and themes behind story lines."

Epstein has directed Artsploitation's A Taste of Phobia, Troma's Grindsploitation, and the 60 Seconds to Die series.

Epstein was the winner of the 2022 Innovation in Film award at Nightmares Film Festival along with partner, Sophia Cacciola. Epstein has collaborated with monochrom's Johannes Grenzfurthner, Izzy Lee, Ungovernable Films, Troma, Tanya Pearson of the Women of Rock Oral History Project, and Stephen Stull of BizarroLand Film Festival.

=== Music ===
Epstein has played in indie bands, including The Motion Sick, Do Not Forsake Me Oh My Darling, The Michael J. Epstein Memorial Library, Darling Pet Munkee, and Neutral Uke Hotel.

The Motion Sick, featuring Epstein on guitar and vocals, were featured as the band of the month in 2006 in SPIN Magazine and were selected as the best unsigned band in Boston by commercial radio station WFNX during the Last Band Standing competition. They also won The Boston Phoenix Best Local Band 2009.

Do Not Forsake Me Oh My Darling, featuring Epstein on bass, were awarded the 6th most creative video of 2011 in TIME Magazine.

The Michael J. Epstein Memorial Library, with Epstein on guitar and vocals, was selected as a CBS best rock band. The band has focused on collaborations, including an original rock ballet at Dorchester's Strand Theatre with BalletRox, Art-Exchange: a collaboration with artists to write songs based on visual works and create visual works based on songs, 37 songs to celebrate speakers at TEDxSomerville and a three-season run as the house band on the franchised Encyclopedia Show. The band was part of a documentary created by Berklee College Pulse to showcase different processes for songwriting.

Epstein also plays in Darling Pet Munkee, a band that writes garage-rock songs about items sold in comic books and kindie band, Space Balloons, focusing on children's songs about out-of-place aliens obsessed with moustaches and Kurt Vonnegut.

=== Academia ===
Epstein was a professor of Audiology/Bioengineering/Communication Sciences and Disorders at Northeastern University from 2005 to 2016. He studied loudness and auditory physiology and has more than 40 published articles and abstracts. He co-authored the Oxford University Press Handbook of Auditory Sciences chapter on Loudness. His PLOS ONE 2016 article, "Toward a differential diagnosis of hidden hearing loss in humans" was featured in The Wall Street Journal and Scientific American. It helped explain why many people with normal hearing struggle to hear in noisy situations.

Epstein gave the keynote speech at the Touro University Worldwide commencement in 2025.

=== Writing ===
Epstein has written short stories in the anthology "The Unnaturals" as part of Hydra Publications' Dystopian Express, BIGFOOT DOES NOT EXIST!: An introduction to the fundamental principles of statistics, science, and logic, and a crowdfunding guidebook for the In 30 Minutes series, which was a finalist in the Foreword INDIES competition and the Independent Publishers of New England Book Awards.

Epstein has written articles for the starter filmmaking site, Filmmaking Fool.

=== Art ===
Together with Sophia Cacciola, Epstein was awarded an art residency with monochrom at Museumsquartier in Vienna, Austria in autumn 2017. He created Nothen für die Tothen, an interactive music art installation for Roboexotica.

Epstein also created sound collage art under the name "M-sli©k da ninjA" and was involved with The Droplift project, for which CDs with copyright-violating samples were reverse-shoplifted onto store shelves, Dictionaraoke, songs created with vocals by dictionary readings of words, and the Beethoven Reclamation Society, a piece in which many artists each recreated a segment of Beethoven's 9th Symphony using sound collaging.

== Personal life ==
Epstein is married to filmmaker and artist Sophia Cacciola. He resides in Los Angeles.

== Selected filmography ==
| Year | Film | Director | Writer | Producer | Actor | Cinematographer |
|---|---|---|---|---|---|---|
| 2022 | The Once and Future Smash | Yes | Yes | Yes | Yes | No |
| 2021 | The Transformations of the Transformations of the Drs. Jenkins | Yes | Yes | Yes | Yes | No |
| 2020 | Darling Pet Monkey | No | No | Yes | No | No |
| 2019 | Half-Cocked | No | No | Yes | No | No |
| 2018 | Clickbait | Yes | Yes | Yes | Yes | No |
| 2017 | Grindsploitation 2: The Lost Reels | Yes | Yes | Yes | No | Yes |
| 2017 | Blood of the Tribades | Yes | Yes | Yes | No | Yes |
| 2015 | Magnetic | Yes | Yes | Yes | No | No |
| 2014 | TEN | Yes | Yes | Yes | No | No |
| 2011 | Quiet Desperation | No | No | No | Yes | No |

== Selected discography ==
| Year | Artist | Album title | Songwriter | Vocals | Guitar | Bass | Production/Engineering |
|---|---|---|---|---|---|---|---|
| 2020 | Night Kisses | Launch Over Short Film Scores, Vol. 1 | Yes | No | No | No | Yes |
| 2019 | Night Kisses | Clickbait | Yes | No | No | No | Yes |
| 2017 | Do Not Forsake Me Oh My Darling | information...information...information! (The Complete Prisoner Recordings) | No | No | No | Yes | Yes |
| 2017 | Do Not Forsake Me Oh My Darling | Whose Side Are You On? | No | No | No | Yes | Yes |
| 2016 | Night Kisses | Blood of the Tribades | Yes | No | No | No | Yes |
| 2016 | Do Not Forsake Me Oh My Darling | In the Village | No | No | No | Yes | Yes |
| 2015 | Night Kisses | Magnetic | Yes | No | No | No | Yes |
| 2015 | Catherine Capozzi and Axemunkee present: Bring Us Your Women | Bring Us Your Women | Yes | Yes | No | No | Yes |
| 2014 | The Michael J. Epstein Memorial Library | TEDxSomerville Speaker Songs 2012-14 | Yes | Yes | Yes | No | Yes |
| 2013 | Do Not Forsake Me Oh My Darling | By Hook or By Crook | No | No | No | Yes | Yes |
| 2012 | Darling Pet Munkee | Glows in the Dark! | Yes | Yes | No | Yes | Yes |
| 2012 | Darling Pet Munkee | You Better Believe It! | Yes | Yes | No | Yes | Yes |
| 2012 | The Michael J. Epstein Memorial Library | Faith in Free | Yes | Yes | Yes | No | Yes |
| 2012 | Space Balloons | Welcome to Balloononia | Yes | Yes | Yes | No | Yes |
| 2012 | The Michael J. Epstein Memorial Library | The Art-Music Exchange | Yes | Yes | Yes | No | Yes |
| 2011 | Do Not Forsake Me Oh My Darling | Questions Are a Burden to Others | No | No | No | Yes | No |
| 2011 | The Michael J. Epstein Memorial Library | Volume One | Yes | Yes | Yes | No | Yes |
| 2010 | Do Not Forsake Me Oh My Darling | The New Number 2 | No | No | No | Yes | No |
| 2008 | The Motion Sick | The Truth Will Catch You, Just Wait... | Yes | Yes | Yes | No | No |
| 2006 | The Motion Sick | Her Brilliant Fifteen | Yes | Yes | Yes | No | No |
| 2002 | M-sli©k da ninjA | Aphorisms on Aphonia and Aphasia: Your Cure For Aphagia (A Collection of 39 Works 1994 - 2000) | Yes | No | No | No | Yes |
| 1998 | Binary Test Record | Binary Test Record | Yes | Yes | Yes | No | No |
