= Monster Fest =

Film festival in Melbourne, Australia

- Official Monster Fest logo
- Status: Active
- Genre: Film festival
- Location: Melbourne
- Country: Australia
- Website: monsterfest.com.au

Monster Fest is an annual genre film festival held in Melbourne, Australia, dedicated to cult and horror cinema. As of 2017 it is the only genre film festival held in Australia to be supported by the federal screen agency, Screen Australia.

== History ==
Monster Fest was established by Neil Foley and Grant Hardie in 2011 as the exhibition arm of Monster Pictures. It was originally called the Fantastic Asia Film Festival (FAFF), as a vehicle for showcasing a selection of Asian films acquired by parent company Monster Pictures. The original Fantastic Asia Film Festival took place 10–13 November 2011 at the Cinema Nova in the Carlton neighbourhood of Melbourne, and was sponsored in part by online entertainment retailer YesAsia. The festival lineup consisted of 20 features, including Yoshihiro Nishimura's Helldriver, Takashi Miike's Ninja Kids!, Na Hong-jin's The Yellow Sea, Noboru Iguchi’s Karate-Robo Zaborgar, Kim Jee Won's I Saw the Devil, Shinji Imaoka's Underwater Love, Sion Sono's Guilty of Romance and Jiang Wen’s Let the Bullets Fly. Special guests of the 2011 festival included director Yoshihiro Nishimura and Marc Walkow, then-co-director of the New York Asian Film Festival.

In 2012, the festival was renamed Monster Fest and expanded to an international festival with both premieres and repertory offerings. The 2012 festival took place from 31 October – 9 November 2012 at the Nova Cinema in Carlton. Special guests of the 2012 festival included the Soska Sisters, Elvira, Mistress of the Dark (Cassandra Peterson) and Laurene Landon. Films screened at the 2012 festival included the Soska Sisters’ American Mary, anthology film The ABCs of Death, Jon Wright’s Grabbers, Mikkel Nørgaard’s Klown, Franck Khalfoun’s Maniac, Daniel Krige’s Redd Inc., Astron 6’s Manborg and Tanzeal Rahim’s Muirhouse, among others. Astron 6’s Father’s Day was refused classification (RC) by the obligatory Australian Classification Board two days before it was meant to screen at the festival, and had to be replaced by the Soska Sisters’ Dead Hooker in a Trunk. The 2012 festival concept trailer was directed by animator/visual artist Isabel Peppard and the key art was created by Tom Hodge.

Monster Fest 2013 took place 21 November – 1 December 2013 at the Nova Cinema in Carlton. The festival screened 30 features, many of them Australian premieres. The festival's guest of honor was Linda Blair, who opened the festival with a 40th Anniversary screening of The Exorcist. Other films screened included Dario Argento’s Dracula 3D, Mike Mendez’ Big Ass Spider!, Daniel Armstrong’s Murderdrome, Richard Wolstencroft’s The Last Days of Joe Blow, Stuart Simpson’s Chocolate Strawberry Vanilla, Glenn Triggs' Apocalyptic, Robert Ben Garant and Thomas Lennon’s Hell Baby, Jeremy Gardner’s The Battery, Adrian Garcia Bogliano’s Here Comes the Devil, Cody Calahan’s Antisocial, J.T. Petty’s Hellbenders, Xan Cassavetes’ Kiss of the Damned, Jake West’s Video Nasties: Moral Panic, Censorship & Videotape and more. Special events included a VHS swap meet and a sidebar of films and presentations showcasing women in horror curated by Briony Kidd of Tasmania’s Stranger With My Face Film Festival. The festival concept trailer (using the tagline "Feed Your Beast") was directed by Stuart Simpson and the festival key art was created by Pete Barrett and Kelsey Simon of Hoof Design, with illustration by Dave Dunstan AKA Loopy Dave.

Monster Fest 2014 marked its first time receiving support from federal funding agency Screen Australia. The festival took place 20–30 November 2014 and was sponsored by Howling Wolves with the tagline "A Feast of Depravity". All screenings were held at Cinema Nova in Carlton, with special events at Yah Yahs in Collingwood (dubbed ‘The Monster’s Lair’ for the run of the festival). Special events included a Lloyd Kaufman ‘Make Your Own Damn Movie’ Masterclass as part of the festival's new industry component ‘Monster Academy’, a horror trivia night, and free happy hour screenings. The Soska Sisters returned to the festival (having visited in 2012) alongside fellow Canadians Matt Kennedy and Conor Sweeney of Astron 6. Films included Kevin Kolsch & Dennis Widmyer's Starry Eyes, Honeymoon, Julia, Savaged, Summer of Blood, David Gregory's Lost Soul: The Doomed Journey of Richard Stanley's Island of Dr. Moreau, Andrew Leavold's The Search for Weng Weng, Charlie’s Farm, Under a Kaleidoscope and more.

Monster Fest 2015 took place 26–29 November 2015, moving to the newly re-opened Lido Cinemas in Hawthorn. Special guests included Dee Wallace, Fred Williamson and Butch Patrick. The opening film was the World Premiere of the Melbourne-made Scare Campaign, with directors Colin and Cameron Cairnes and producer Julie Ryan in person. The official selection featured 21 films including Bound to Vengeance, Scare Campaign, Bite, Australiens, Vixen Velvet's Zombie Massacre, Bunny the Killer Thing, Hellions, and Howl. The program also featured the world premieres of Queensland horror-western Bullets for the Dead (the final role of Prisoner star Carol "Franky Doyle" Burns), making its debut screening alongside Dave Jackson's feature version of his 2012 short film, Cat Sick Blues, while guest Fred Williamson presented the world premiere of Nico Sentner's Atomic Eden alongside retrospective screenings of Black Caesar and The Hammer. The festival also included a special 10th anniversary screening of Australian horror classic Wolf Creek, a rooftop bands-and-burlesque event called "Munsterpalooza" and an all-day acting masterclass with actress Dee Wallace, co-presented with Melbourne-based film exhibition group Cinemaniacs. Butch Patrick presented a rare screening of Munster, Go Home! and a clip-and- tell presentation called "I Was a Pre-Teen Werewolf". The festival key artwork for 2015 was created by Canadian artist Jason Edmiston.

From 2011 to 2015, the Festival Director was Neil Foley, co-founder of Monster Pictures and Monster Fest and director of the 1999 mockumentary film Bigger than Tina. In 2016, Monster Fest hired Kier-La Janisse, Canadian film programmer and author of House of Psychotic Women: An Autobiographical Topography of Female Neurosis in Horror and Exploitation Films (FAB Press, 2012) to be the new Festival Director. The 2016 printed program was launched at the Lido Cinema on 31 October 2016 with a screening of Rob Zombie’s 31. While previously known for its emphasis on horror films, the 2016 festival expanded to showcase other genres including crime, action, western, children’s films, animation and documentary. The 2016 festival theme was ‘ritual’ and its concept trailer was an homage to the 1966 film Eye of the Devil. This theme coincided with the creation of Monster Pictures’ rebranding of its website as ‘The Cult of Monster’ with the festival tagline "Join the Cult!" urging customers to sign up for fortnightly newsletter ‘The Monsterite’ and to attend the Cult of Monster Marathon at the festival, where the first 50 participants would receive a free Cult robe with embroidered Cult of Monster insignia.

The keynote speaker for 2016 was director Ted Kotcheff, who presented screenings of Wake in Fright, First Blood, Weekend at Bernie’s and Split Image, as well as a masterclass moderated by Mark Hartley, the director of Not Quite Hollywood: The Wild, Untold Story of Ozploitation. Other guests included director Julia Ducournau, who appeared to present the Australian Premiere of her film Raw as the festival's opening-night film, director Mattie Do, who presented the Australian premiere of her film Dearest Sister, director Neil Edwards, who presented the Australian Premiere of his film Sympathy for the Devil: The True Story of the Process Church of the Final Judgement and actors Sky Elobar and Elizabeth De Razzo who appeared with Closing Film The Greasy Strangler. De Razzo had replaced actor Michael St. Michaels, who was denied entry to Australia a week before the event. Other features screened at the 2016 festival included Ben Wheatley’s Free Fire, Paul Schrader’s Dog Eat Dog, Chris Peckover’s Safe Neighborhood, Alice Lowe’s Prevenge, Bartosz M. Kowalski’s Playground, Liam Gavin’s A Dark Song, André Øvredal’s The Autopsy of Jane Doe, Sophia Takal’s Always Shine, Jesse Moss’ The Bandit, Matthew Holmes’ The Legend of Ben Hall, Gonzalo López-Gallego’s The Hollow Point and a new digital restoration of Andrzej Żuławski’s On the Silver Globe. The festival included many symposium events including talks on Ghostwatch, The Evil Touch, occultism on daytime soaps and a panel on Made-for-TV movies as part of its ‘Frequencies’ sidebar on genre TV, and to coincide with the world premiere launch of Made for TV Mayhem blogger Amanda Reyes’ new book Are You in the House Alone? A TV Movie Compendium 1964-1999. Special events included a Nightmare VHS Boardgame Party, Kooks + Spooks Trivia and a live radio play, Maxie Diablo and the Funky Funky Sex Murders. The festival key artwork for 2016 was created by Canadian artist Matt Ryan Tobin.

In 2016 the festival announced its most successful year to date, noting that it had tripled attendance from the previous year.

In June 2017, Festival Director Kier-La Janisse left her position at Monster Fest. As of 2017 it is the only genre film festival in Australia to be supported by Screen Australia.

== Accolades ==
Beat Magazine called Monster Fest "Australia's foremost celebration of international cult and horror cinema".

2016 Keynote speaker Ted Kotcheff said of Monster Fest: "I loved the creative energy of Monster Fest, the great programming, the enthusiastic audiences. In the course of over half a century of filmmaking, I have attended almost every film festival there is and Monster Fest is one of the most interesting and enjoyable that I’ve experienced."

== Monster Academy ==
Monster Academy is the industry and educational component of Monster Fest. The academy began in 2014 as the "Monster Academy of Horror & Mayhem" with a Masterclass by Troma’s Lloyd Kaufman and a panel on ‘Elevated Genre Screenwriting’ featuring Aaron Sterns (Wolf Creek 2), Shayne Armstrong and Shane Krause (6 Miranda Drive), Matthew A. Brown (Julia), and Colin and Cameron Cairnes (100 Bloody Acres), moderated by Mark Lazarus of Arclight Films. It was held at Yah Yah's in Collingwood. After a hiatus in 2015, Monster Academy returned in 2016, dubbed "The Swinburne University Media and Communication Monster Academy" as the result of a partnership with Swinburne University, who hosted the event at their Hawthorn campus.

The 2016 Monster Academy was a two-day event held 23 and 24 November 2016 including a masterclass with Ted Kotcheff moderated by Mark Hartley; a Romper Stomper panel with director Geoffrey Wright; producer Daniel Scharf and actors John Brumpton and Frank Magree; a classic Ozploitation panel with producer Antony I. Ginnane and cinematographer Vincent Monton, a producer's panel with John Jarratt, Lizzette Atkins, and Raquelle David; a women in genre panel with Julia Ducournau, Mattie Do, Briony Kidd, Donna McRae, Isabel Peppard, Marisa Brown, and Heidi Lee Douglas; and an FX panel with artists Dieter Barry and Nick Kocsis. Monster Academy also featured a screening of Ted Kotcheff’s Wake in Fright and a presentation on the transmedia project The Westbury Faery.

== Satellite events ==
In addition to its annual festival in Melbourne, Monster Pictures has mounted screenings year round under the banner "Monster Fest Presents". These have included compacted satellite versions of the festival in Perth (2012, 2014), Auckland (2013) and Hobart (2016) as well as screenings at the Lido Cinema and the New Farm Cinema in Brisbane as part of a series called "Friday Fright Nights." Friday Fright Nights screenings have included The Human Centipede III (Final Sequence) with star Laurence R. Harvey in person The Green Inferno, The Pack, Cat Sick Blues, I Am Not a Serial Killer (with Skype Q+A with director Billy O’Brien), Aaaaaaaah! (with actress Lucy Honigman in person and Skype Q+A with director Steve Oram) and The Eyes of My Mother.

In August 2016 Monster Fest presented a tour of the Australian zombie film Bullets for the Dead at the Dendy Cinema in Sydney, the New Farm in Brisbane and the State Cinema in Hobart, with select cast and crew in attendance at each event. December 2016 also saw a tour of The Greasy Strangler (dubbed the #GREASYDOWNUNDER Tour) with stars Sky Elobar and Elizabeth De Razzo accompanying the film to Ballarat, Hobart, Brisbane and Sydney.

In January 2017, Monster Pictures announced that it would be presenting "The Monster Fest Travelling Sideshow," a weekend-long event featuring highlights from Monster Fest 2016 alongside the Australian premieres of horror anthology XX, Sydney-made crime film Skinford and a new 4K of Dario Argento’s Suspiria, in partnership with Australian cinema chain, Event Cinemas, 9–12 March 2017 at Sydney’s George Street Cinemas.

Monster Fest also announced Horror for the Homeless, an all night marathon screening event held on 11 March 2017 at the Burswood Parklands in the city of Perth in conjunction with Telethon Community Cinemas and Perth based homeless agency, Youth Futures WA

== List of awards ==
Since 2014, Monster Fest has held a juried competition as well as an audience award called the "Monster’s Choice." Past jurors have included Barbara Creed (author, The Monstrous-Feminine), Evrim Ersoy (Director of Programming, Fantastic Fest), Heidi Lee Douglas (Director, Little Lamb), Amanda Reyes (Editor, Are You in the House Alone? A TV Movie Compendium 1964-1999), film critic Simon Foster, Donna McRae (Director, Johnny Ghost), Isabel Peppard (Director, Butterflies), Michael Helms (editor of Australian fanzine Fatal Visions), Chris Brown (Producer, The Proposition) and more.

=== 2014 ===
==== Features ====
Crystal Monster: STARRY EYES (Kevin Kolsch & Dennis Widmyer, USA)
Crystal Monster 2013 (retroactive): CHOCOLATE STRAWBERRY VANILLA (Stuart Simpson, Australia)
Best Australian Feature: UNDER A KALEIDOSCOPE (Addison Heath, USA)
Best Director: HONEYMOON (Leigh Janiak, USA)
Best Female Lead: Ashley C. Williams, JULIA (Matthew A. Brown, USA)
Best Male Lead: Adam Brooks, THE EDITOR (Adam Brooks and Matthew Kennedy, Canada)
Best Screenplay: Onur Tukel, SUMMER OF BLOOD (Onur Tukel, USA)
Best Special Effects: CHARLIE’S FARM (Chris Sun, Australia)
Best Sound: THE EDITOR (Adam Brooks and Matthew Kennedy, Canada)
Monster Special Jury Award: LOST SOUL: THE DOOMED JOURNEY OF RICHARD STANLEY’S THE ISLAND OF DR. MOREAU (David Gregory, USA)
Monster Spirit Award: THE SEARCH FOR WENG WENG (Andrew Leavold, Australia)

==== Short films ====
Best International Short Film: DEAD HEARTS (Stephen W. Martin, Canada)
Best Australian Short Film: WATERBORNE (Ryan Coonan, Australia)
Best Victorian Short Film: 2043 (Eugenie Muggleton, Australia)
Best Director: Shaun McCarthy, THE BOY WHO HAD NO THUMBS (Shaun McCarthy, Australia)
Best Screenplay: Claire D’Este, THE JELLY WRESTLER (Rebecca Thomson, Australia)

==== “Monster’s Choice” Audience Award ====
Best Film: PLAGUE (Nick Kozakis and Kosta Ouzas, Australia)

=== 2015 ===
==== Feature films ====
Crystal Monster: SCARE CAMPAIGN (Colin and Cameron Cairnes, Australia)
Best Australian Film: CAT SICK BLUES (David Jackson, Australia)
Monster Innovation Award: VELVET VIXEN’S ZOMBIE MASSACRE (Stefan Popescu, Australia)
Best Female Lead: Elma Begovic, BITE (Chad Archibald, Canada)
Best Male Lead: Sterling Knight, LANDMINE GOES CLICK (Levan Bakhia, Georgia)
Best Director: SCARE CAMPAIGN (Colin and Cameron Cairnes, Australia)
Best Screenplay: SCARE CAMPAIGN (Colin and Cameron Cairnes, Australia)
Best Special Effects: BITE (Chad Archibald, Canada)
Best Sound: SCARE CAMPAIGN

==== Short films ====
Best International Short: BEYOND FEROX (Thomas Yagodinski, USA)
Best Victorian Short: THE PRIEST (Goran Spoljaric, Australia)
Best Screenplay: INNSMOUTH (Izzy Lee, USA)
Best Director: NIGHT OF THE SLASHER (Shant Hamassian, USA)

=== 2016 ===
==== Feature films ====
Golden Monster: RAW (Julia Ducournau, France)
Best International Feature: THE AUTOPSY OF JANE DOE (André Øvredal, USA)
Best Australian Feature: SAFE NEIGHBORHOOD (Chris Peckover, Australia)
Monster Innovation Award: PREVENGE (Alice Lowe, UK)
Best Performance (Male): Levi Miller, SAFE NEIGHBOURHOOD (Chris Peckover, Australia)
Best Performance (Female): Mackenzie Davis, ALWAYS SHINE (Sophia Takal, USA)
Best Documentary: SYMPATHY FOR THE DEVIL: THE TRUE STORY OF THE PROCESS CHURCH OF THE FINAL JUDGEMENT (Neil Edwards, UK)
Best Director: PLAYGROUND (Bartosz M. Kowalsi, Poland)
Best Cinematography: A DARK SONG (Liam Gavin, Ireland/UK)
Best Score: A DARK SONG (Liam Gavin, Ireland/UK)
Best FX: RAW (Julia Ducournau, France)
Special Mention: Autohead (Rohit Mittal, India)

==== Short films ====
Best International Short: THE TUNNEL (André Øvredal, Norway)
Best Australian Short: INSOMNOLENCE (Kiefer Findlow, Australia)
Best Victorian Short: SECRETIONS (Goran Spoljaric, Australia)
Best Director: WHAT HAPPENED TO HER (Kristy Guevara-Flanagan, USA)
Best Screenplay: THE INCREDIBLE TALE OF THE INCREDIBLE WOMAN-SPIDER (Pablo Guirado, France)
Best Performance: Najarra Townsend, THE STYLIST (Jill Gevargizian, USA)
Best Effects: THE PAST INSIDE THE PRESENT (James Siewert, USA)
Best Cinematography: DISCO INFERNO (Alice Waddington, Spain)
Best Score: IMITATIONS (Fabian Velasco & Milos Mitrovic, Canada)

==== Trasharama Awards ====
Trasharama Golden Lomax Award: THE CONTRACT (Chrzu Lindstrom, Finland)
Trasharama Encouragement Award: BLOWN AWAY (Frank Daft, Australia)

==== “Monster’s Choice” Audience Awards ====
Best Feature: MONDO YAKUZA (Addison Heath, Australia)
Best Short: Tie: DRAGON FORCE (Stuart Simpson, Australia) / A HELL OF A DAY (Evan Hughes, Australia)

=== 2018 ===
==== Features ====
Golden Monster (Best Picture): LORDS OF CHAOS (Jonas Åkerlund, United States)
Best International Feature: FIRST LIGHT (Jason Stone, United States)
Best Australian Feature: PIMPED (David Barker, Australia)
Best Director: LARS VON TRIER, The House That Jack Built (Denmark/United States)
Special Jury Prize: BURNING KISS (Robbie Studsor, Australia)

==== Short films ====
Best Short: HELSINKI MANSPLAINING MASSACRE (Ilja Rautsi, Finland)
Best International Short: Milk (Santiago Menghini, Canada)
Best Australian Short: POST MORTEM MARY (Josh Long, Australia)
Best Victorian Short: FEAST ON THE YOUNG (Katia Mancuso, Australia)
Best Student Short: NEUROPLUG (Caleb Turland, Deakin University)
TRASHARAMA Golden Lomax: BFF GIRLS (Brian Lonano, United States)

=== 2020 ===
==== Features ====
Golden Monster: POSSESSOR (Brandon Cronenberg, Canada)
Best Director: POSSESSOR (Brandon Cronenberg, Canada)
Audience Award: PSYCHO GOREMAN (Steven Kostanski, Canada)

==== Short films ====
Best Short Film: SNAKE DICK (David Mahmoudieh, United States)
Best Australian Short Film: CARRIE’S DOING GREAT (Bryce Kraehenbuehl, Alexander Salkicevic, Australia)

=== 2022 ===
==== Features ====
Golden Monster: Ribspreader (Dick Dale, Australia) Best Australian Feature: Slant (James Vinson, Australia)

==== Short films ====
Best Victorian Short: Hen (Alice Tovey, Australia) Best Australian Short: Fungus (Ryan Maddox, Australia) Best Short: The Rock of Ages (Eron Sheean, France/Iceland) Best Student Short: Squid in the Oven (Sasha Aubort, Australia)

== See also ==
- List of fantastic and horror film festivals
