= Peter Kuplowsky =

Canadian film producer and festival curator

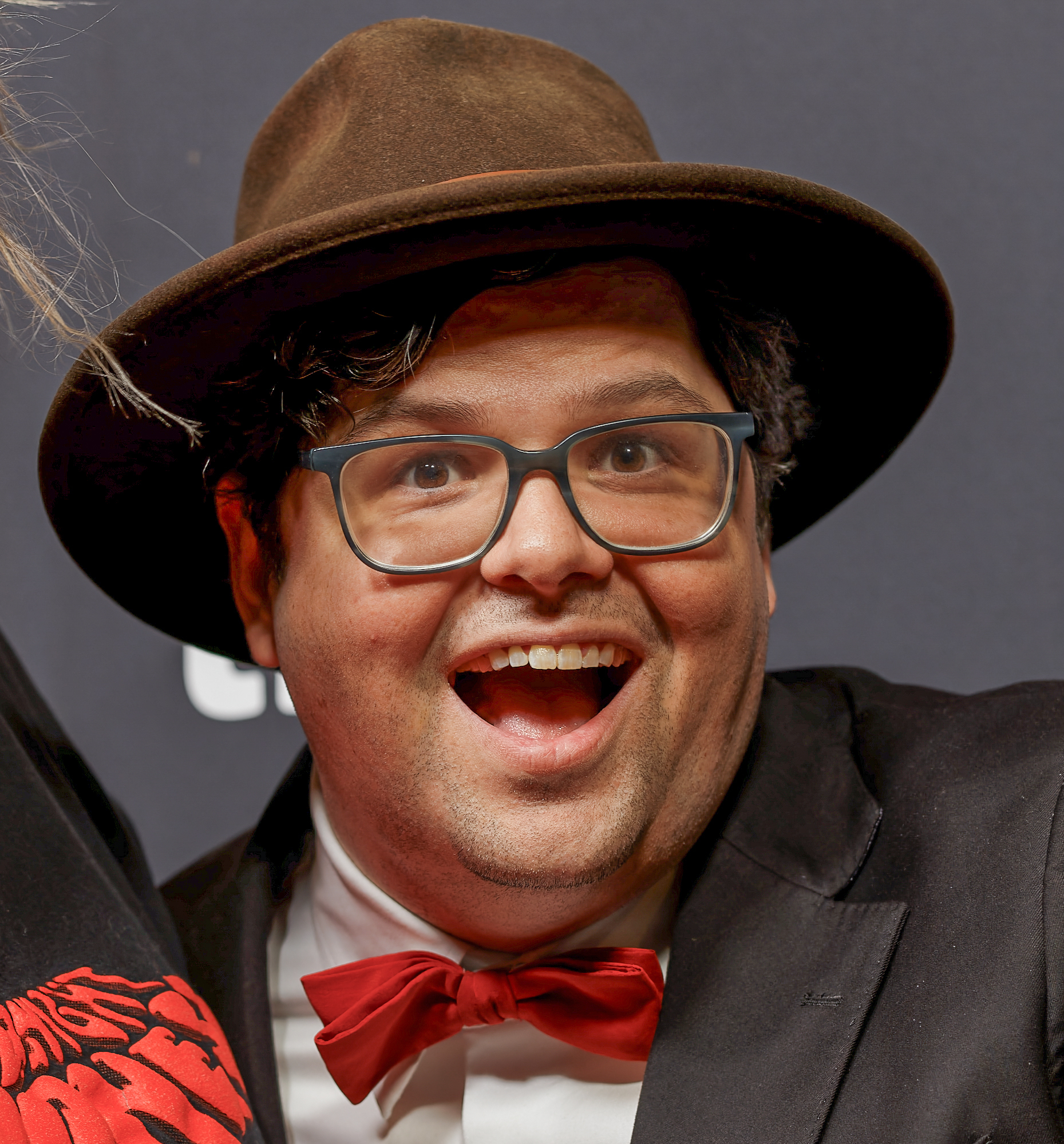
- Kuplowsky at the 2025 Toronto International Film Festival
- Born: 1986 or 1987 (age 39–40); Toronto, Ontario, Canada
- Education: MA Cinema Studies, University of Toronto, 2010
- Occupations: Film producer, actor, film festival programmer
- Notable work: In a Violent Nature

Peter Kuplowsky (born 1986 or 1987) is a Canadian film producer, actor, and film festival programmer. He has programmed the Toronto International Film Festival (TIFF)'s Midnight Madness programme since 2017, a position important to genre and independent films. He is also a legacy director for the Toronto After Dark Film Festival. Prior to programming Midnight Madness, he was a programmer for the Bloor Cinema (now Hot Docs), and the Fantastic Fest in Austin, Texas. This programming experience was instrumental in his film production activities.

== Early life and education ==
Peter Kuplowsky was born in 1986 or 1987 in Toronto, Ontario and brought up in the district of Etobicoke. He graduated from the University of Toronto with a master's degree in cinema studies. At U of T, he was president of the Cinema Studies Student's Union. The Union presented a series of free films weekly at Innis College.

== Career ==
While at U of T, Kuplowsky became Programming Manager for the Toronto After Dark Film Festival continuing after he joined TIFF. After the After Dark's founder Adam Lopez became ill and postponed the festival in 2024, he entrusted the festival to Kuplowsky, making him a legacy director. He revived it in 2025, the same year that Lopez died. Kuplowsky had to re-organize the festival, incorporating it, organizing on-line ticket sales, and adding sponsorships to provide long-term stability. Kuplowsky felt a responsibility to the festival: "I owe a lot to this festival. It gave me my first start in the film industry and I’ll always be grateful to Adam for that. "Honoring Adam’s legacy and finding a means to keep the festival going in his absence is not something I take lightly."

Aside from After Dark, Kuplowsky also curated the Laser Blast genre festival in Toronto and was a programmer for Fantastic Fest in Austin, Texas. In 2015, Kuplowsky founded and curated the What the Film Festival (WTF Fest) at the Royal Cinema, which collected several of his favourite so-called 'so-bad-it's-good' films such as Phobe: The Xenophoic Experiments and I Am a Knife with Legs. While one could assume that WTF Fest was sneering at those films, Kuplowsky disagreed: "WTF is less about that idea that something so bad that it can only be enjoyed by mocking it, and more about finding innovation in very fiercely independent and amateur productions."

Kuplowsky introducing Rogue Trooper at 2026 Toronto International Film Festival. Kuplowsky's trademark fedora is on the stand.

In 2013, Kuplowsky joined TIFF as programming associate to Colin Geddes, working for Geddes until he moved over to Shudder in 2017. In addition, he had regularly attended all Midnight Madness screenings as a genre fan since 2005. His passion for film was noted in activities such as dressing as a frog for Takashi Miike's Yakuza Apocalypse (2015). He once rushed the stage after a screening of Stuart Gordon's Stuck (2007) to have the director autograph his copy of Robot Jox (1989).

Kuplowsky selects the ten films presented at TIFF as a 'top ten', "not so much in an objective or evaluative sense, but more in a representative way that reflects what genre/midnight filmmaking looks like in the world right now." "Great midnight movies are the ones that lead to evolutions in genre. I think the best ones are not concerned with adhering to any kind of convention. It’s more about the unpredictability of the film and the artist behind it." He is the sole programmer of the Midnight Madness program, unlike the other sections, whose selections are chosen by committee. According to Dread Central, the Midnight Madness program has been rated among the top genre festivals in its list of the "90 Best Genre Fests on Earth". "If a film plays at Midnight Madness, it has come a long way and achieved real success," "for many filmmakers, it’s the ultimate platform for genre premieres—and a badge of honor" and "films shown here spread rapidly all over the world." According to Kuplowsky, "Oftentimes for the films in the section, it is easier for a distributor to take a chance on that film because that TIFF laurel and that Midnight Madness status does go a long way in terms of both consumer confidence and distributor confidence." From Geddes, Kuplowsky learned "that it’s important to remember that as much as a programme should and will reflect a curator’s personal sensibilities, the audience’s interests and expectations should always be taken into account."

Many of the Midnight Madness program films include world or North American premieres. These include The Disaster Artist (2017)^{a}, The Wind (2018), Halloween (2018)^{a}, The Predator (2018)^{a}, The Standoff at Sparrow Creek (2018)^{a}, Nekrotronic (2018)^{a}, Diamantino (2018)^{b}, Ick (2024)^{a}, The Substance (2024)^{b}, Obsession (2025)^{a}, Nirvanna the Band the Show the Movie (2025)^{a}, Normal (2025)^{a}, The Face of Horror (2026), Rogue Trooper (2026)^{b}, and Vintage Violence (2026). In 2022, Midnight Madness screened The People's Joker (2022)^{a}, a controversial choice that was pulled from the festival after one screening, due to rights issues over the use of copyrighted characters.

Kuplowsky is the founder and president of the independent film development company Low Sky Productions. He has been a producer for films such as The Void (2016), The Interior (2015), Manborg (2011), and ABCs of Death 2 (2014). He has continued to produce films since becoming programmer at TIFF including In a Violent Nature (2024) and its sequel, In a Violent Nature: Part 2 (2026). He also co-produced PG: Psycho Goreman (2020).

Kuplowsky has also appeared in documentaries like Best Worst Movie (2009), which is about the cult film Troll 2 (1990).

== Filmography ==
- Best Worst Movie (2009) - as himself
- Manborg (2011) - executive producer
- ABCs of Death 2 (2014) - associate producer, producer, actor
- Teddy Bomb (2014) - actor
- We're in a Fight (2014) - actor
- The Interior (2015) - producer
- The Void (2016) - co-producer
- Impossible Horror (2017) - actor
- Mangoshake (2018) - executive producer
- Climate of the Hunter (2019) - associate producer
- Agnes (2021) - associate producer
- Metal Detector Maniac (2021) - actor
- Castration Movie Anthology I: Traps (2024) - actor
- In a Violent Nature (2024) - producer
- Every Heavy Thing (2025) - producer, actor
- Deathstalker (2025) - executive producer
- Camp (2025) - executive producer
- In a Violent Nature: Part 2 (2026) - producer

Source: IMDb, unless otherwise cited.

== Notes ==
A ^a World premieres.
2. ^b North American premieres.
