= Deathstalker (disambiguation) =

Deathstalker is a species of scorpion, Leiurus quinquestriatus, also known as Omdurman scorpion or the Israeli desert scorpion.

Deathstalker may also refer to:

- Death-Stalker, a Marvel Comics supervillain character, first appearing in 1968
- Deathstalker (1983 film), a sword-and-sorcery film, and its sequels:
  - Deathstalker II (1987)
  - Deathstalker and the Warriors from Hell (1988)
  - Deathstalker IV: Match of Titans (1990)
  - Deathstalker (2025 film)
- Deathstalker (series), a series of science fiction novels by Simon R. Green
  - Deathstalker (novel)
- Death Stalker, a 1988 video game designed by Tony Warriner
