= Simon R. Green bibliography =

This is a complete bibliography by English space opera and fantasy author Simon R. Green.

== Bibliography ==
Most of Green's works take place within the same fictional realm, encompassing multiple realities which characters inhabit, or in some cases move between. Although cross-series use of characters or settings is frequently limited to passing mentions or brief cameo appearances, a number of Green's stories have prominently featured characters from other works in a manner that is significant to the plot. Despite this, Green's works can, with some exceptions, be separated into several distinct series and standalone novels.

=== Series ===
==== Deathstalker ====
1. Deathstalker (London, Gollancz 1995).
2. Deathstalker Rebellion (London, Vista 1996).
3. Deathstalker War (London, Gollancz/Vista 1997).
4. Deathstalker Honour (London, Gollancz/Vista 1998).
5. Deathstalker Destiny (London, Orion/Millennium 1999), noted as the "final" book in series at the time of publication
6. Deathstalker Legacy (2003)
7. Deathstalker Return (New York, Roc 2004). ISBN 0-451-42821-8
8. Deathstalker Coda (2005)

The Deathstalker series is partly a parody of the usual space opera of the 1950s, told with sovereign disregard of the rules of probability, while being at the same time extremely bloodthirsty.

==== Forest Kingdom ====
1. Blue Moon Rising. New York, Penguin/Roc, May 1991; London, Gollancz, September 1991.
2. Blood and Honour. London, Gollancz, June 1992; as Blood and Honor, New York, Penguin/Roc, May 1993.
3. Down Among the Dead Men. London, Gollancz, September 1993; New York, Penguin/Roc, December 1993.
4. Beyond the Blue Moon (2000). ISBN 0-575-07045-5
5. Once in a Blue Moon. Roc, USA, January 2014; ISBN 978-0451414663.

This series focuses on characters and events in the northern areas of the Low Kingdoms, the same kingdom which encompasses the southern city of Haven (the setting of the Hawk and Fisher series). It largely deals with the events and aftermath of the Demon War, focusing on multiple characters and plot arcs. The series serves as a companion to the Hawk and Fisher series, Blue Moon Rising taking place before the first Hawk and Fisher novel, and Beyond the Blue Moon being a followup to both Blue Moon Rising and the Hawk and Fisher series as a whole.

==== Ghost Finders ====
1. Ghost of a Chance (August 2010)
2. Ghost of a Smile (August 2011)
3. Ghost of a Dream (August 2012)
4. Spirits From Beyond (August 2013)
5. Voices From Beyond (26 August 2014)
6. Forces From Beyond (25 August 2015)

The Ghostfinders of the Carnacki Institute are here to "Do Something" about ghosts, and live by the motto "We don't take any shit from the Hereafter". This series follows a team of three Ghostfinders: the leader, JC Chance, who was touched by something from Outside in a recent case and is still trying to determine what all that means; Melody Chambers, girl geek and computer expert; and "Happy" Jack Palmer, Class Eleven telepath and official gloomy bugger. They are joined by JC's ghost girlfriend, Kim. JC's motley crew is now considered an "A Team" at the institute, and are slowly putting pieces together of a greater threat facing humanity. The Ghost Finders series was ended when the sixth book was released in August 2015.

The Ghostfinders series takes place in the same world as the Nightside, Secret Histories, and various other Simon R. Green novels, with frequent references to characters and places between them.

==== Hawk and Fisher ====
1. Hawk & Fisher. New York, Ace, Sep 1990; as No Haven for the Guilty, London, Headline, Aug 1990.
2. Hawk & Fisher: Winner Takes All. New York, Ace, Jan 1991; as Devil Take the Hindmost, London, Headline, Feb 1991.
3. Hawk & Fisher: The God Killer. New York, Ace, Jun 1991; London, Headline, Sep 1991.
4. Hawk & Fisher: Wolf in the Fold. New York, Ace, Sep 1991; as Vengeance for a Lonely Man, London, Headline, Mar 1992.
5. Hawk & Fisher: Guard Against Dishonor. New York, Ace, Dec 1991; as Guard Against Dishonour, London, Headline, Jun 1992.
6. Hawk & Fisher: The Bones of Haven. New York, Ace, Mar 1992; as Two Kings in Haven, London, Headline, Oct 1992.
7. Hawk & Fisher: Beyond the Blue Moon. (2000)
8. Hawk & Fisher: Once in a Blue Moon. (2014)
- Swords of Haven: The Adventures of Hawk & Fisher (omnibus; Hawk & Fisher, Winner Takes All, and The God Killer). New York, Penguin/Roc, Jul 1999; as Haven of Lost Souls (omnibus; contains No Haven for the Guilty, Devil Take the Hindmost, and The God Killer), London, Orion/Millennium, Nov 1999.
- Guards of Haven (omnibus; contains Wolf in the Fold, Guard Against Dishonour, and The Bones of Haven). New York, Penguin/Roc, Nov 1999; as Fear and Loathing in Haven (omnibus; contains Vengeance for a Lonely Man, Guard Against Dishonour, and Two Kings in Haven), London, Millennium, Apr 2000.

Hawk and Fisher are a husband and wife team on the City Guard, an order which functions rather like a modern police force in a fantasy world of mixed Medieval, Renaissance, and Industrial Revolution stylings. They live in the port city of Haven, a city-state so corrupt that they can justly make the claim of being the only guards who have never taken a bribe or looked the other direction. They deal with everything from pickpockets to wide-scale destructive magic.

==== Ishmael Jones ====
1. The Dark Side of the Road (May 2015)
2. Dead Man Walking (May 2016)
3. Very Important Corpses: An Ishmael Jones mystery (March 2017)
4. Death Shall Come (September 2017)
5. Into the Thinnest of Air (March 2018)
6. Murder in the Dark (August 2018)
7. Till Sudden Death Do Us Part (August 2019)
8. Night Train to Murder (January 2020)
9. The House on Widows Hill (July 2020)
10. Buried Memories (October 2021)
11. Haunted by the Past (December 2022)

Ishmael Jones is someone who cannot afford to be noticed, someone who lives under the radar, who drives on the dark side of the road. He is employed to search out secrets, investigate mysteries and shine a light in dark places. Sometimes he kills people.

==== Nightside ====
1. Something from the Nightside (New York, Ace, 2003)
2. Agents of Light and Darkness (New York, Ace, 2003)
3. Nightingale's Lament (New York, Ace, 2004)
4. Hex and the City (New York, Ace, 2005)
5. Paths Not Taken (New York, Ace, September 2005)
6. Sharper than a Serpent's Tooth (Ace, 28 February 2006)
7. Hell to Pay (Ace, 27 December 2006)
8. The Unnatural Inquirer (Ace, 2 January 2008)
9. Just Another Judgement Day (Ace, 6 January 2009)
10. The Good, the Bad, and the Uncanny (Ace, 5 January 2010)
11. A Hard Day's Knight (Ace, 4 January 2011)
12. The Bride Wore Black Leather (Ace, 3 January 2012), ISBN 1-937007-13-8
- A Walk on the Nightside (Ace, 5 September 2006; an omnibus collection of the first three Nightside novels.)

A series of fantasy novels centering on the protagonist, John Taylor, and based in the "Nightside", a hidden area within London in which magic and advanced technology exist. This series also ties into the Hawk and Fisher series (i.e. mentioning the Street of the Gods, a prominent setting in the second and third novellas, Winner Take All and God Killer). Indeed, Hawk and Fisher appear drinking at Strangefellows Pub in the Nightside as an unnamed but clearly recognizable couple in A Hard Day's Knight, and the Deathstalker series is often referenced: Haceldama, Hadenmen, and the Darkvoid Device are all mentioned in passing. Razor Eddie, Punk God of the Straight Razor, is rumored to have gone to the Street of the Gods to make a deal with some unknown deity for all the evil he had done, and came back changed. The Nightside series was completed when the twelfth book was released in January 2012.

==== Secret History ====
1. The Man with the Golden Torc (UK: 17 May 2007; US: 5 June 2007)
2. Daemons Are Forever (US: 3 June 2008)
3. The Spy Who Haunted Me (UK: 12 April 2009; US: 2 June 2009)
4. From Hell with Love (US: 1 June 2010)
5. For Heaven's Eyes Only (US: 7 June 2011)
6. Live and Let Drood (US: 5 June 2012)
7. Casino Infernale (US: 4 June 2013)
8. Property of a Lady Faire (3 June 2014)
9. From a Drood to a Kill (2 June 2015)
10. Dr. DOA (US 7 July 2016)
11. Moonbreaker (6 June 2017)
12. Night Fall (12 June 2018)

This book series was supposed to be a trilogy, but due to the great popularity of the books Green decided to continue with the series, until finally ending it with Night Fall. Being all from the same universe, the Deathstalker series has had a member of the Deathstalker family in the Secret Histories novel. Along with this comes a meeting with John Taylor, a cameo appearance of Walker (both from the Nightside series), and an appearance of the Carnacki Institute's boss (from the Ghost Finders series).

==== Twilight of the Empire ====
(Prelude to the Deathstalker series)

1. Mistworld. New York, Ace, Sep 1992; London, Gollancz, Nov 1992.
2. Ghostworld. New York, Ace, Mar 1993; London, Gollancz, Sep 1993.
3. Hellworld. New York, Ace, Sep 1993; revised, London, Gollancz, Dec 1995.
4. Twilight of the Empire (omnibus; contains Mistworld, Ghostworld, and Hellworld). New York, Penguin/Roc, Aug 1997; as Deathstalker Prelude (with revised version of Hellworld), London, Gollancz/Vista, Nov 1998.

Set in the Deathstalker universe. Mistworld tells the tale of the Empire's attack on the free planet of Mistworld, haven of outlaws and rebels, using Typhoid Mary. Ghostworld introduces Captain Silence and his crew as they respond to an emergency on the (supposedly) dead planet of Unseeli. Hellworld finds Captain Hunter and his scouts stranded on a nightmarish planet.

All three novellas either introduce characters that later appear in the main Deathstalker epic series, or concern events that are later referred to in the main Deathstalker epic series.

==== Gideon Sable ====
1. The Best Thing You Can Steal. Edinburgh, Severn House, Apr 2021.
2. A Matter of Death and Life. Edinburgh, Severn House, Mar 2022.
3. What Song the Sirens Sang. Edinburgh, Severn House, Oct 2022.
4. Not of This World. Edinburgh, Severn House, Apr 2023.
5. Where is Anybody?. Edinburgh, Severn House, Aug 2024.

==== Jekyll & Hyde Inc. ====
1. Jekyll & Hyde Inc. New York, Baen Books, Sep 2021
2. Hyde & Seek. New York, Baen Books, May 2024

=== Standalone books ===
- Robin Hood: Prince of Thieves (film novelization)
- Shadows Fall

The Shadows Fall novel takes place in the same world as the Nightside series and is mentioned as a destination via subway in several of the Nightside novels. Characters mentioned in the Shadows Fall novel have appeared in the Nightside including Father Time, Bruin Bear, and Sea Goat as well as the building Time Tower, which is the residence of Father Time.

- Drinking Midnight Wine

An audio version of Drinking Midnight Wine was released in 2013, read by English actor Dikran Tulaine

- Missile Gap

=== Short stories ===
Green plans to release all his short stories in two separate anthologies. The second will be a collection of Nightside shorts featuring a new novella, and the first anthology will contain his other works, also including a new novella.

- "Awake, Awake, Ye Northern Winds" (1979), Swords Against Darkness V
- "Soulhunter" (1982), Fantasy Macabre 3
- "In the Labyrinth" (Winter 1983), Fantasy Tales, v6 #12
- "Death is a Lady" (1997), Dancing with the Dark
- "Richard Evans - Remembered" (January 1998), The Alien Has Landed #5
- "Manslayer" (2000), Swords Against the Millennium
- "The Nightside, Needless to Say" (October 2004), Powers Of Detection
- "Razor Eddie’s Big Night Out" (July 2006), Cemetery Dance #55
- "Lucy, at Christmastime" (October 2008), Wolfsbane and Mistletoe
- "Appetite for Murder" (December 2008), Unusual Suspects
- "The Difference a Day Makes" (January 2009), Mean Streets
- "Some of These Cons Go Way Back" (June 2009), Cemetery Dance #60
- "Food of the Gods" (August 2009), Dark Delicacies III: Haunted
- "He Said, Laughing" (September 2010), Living Dead 2
- "Street Wizard" (November 2010), The Way of the Wizard
- "The Spirit of the Thing" (March 2011), Those Who Fight Monsters
- "It's All In the Rendering" (August 2011), Home Improvement, Undead Edition
- "Jesus and Satan Go Jogging in the Desert" (September 2011), The Monster's Corner
- "Hungry Heart" (October 2011), Down These Strange Streets
- "Down and Out in Dead Town", 21st Century Dead: A Zombie Anthology (July 2012)
- "How Do You Feel", Hex Appeal (June 2012)
- "Dorothy Dreams", Oz Reimagined: New Tales from the Emerald City and Beyond (February 2013)

The first anthology, Tales from the Hidden World, was released on 8 July 2014. It includes a new Secret Histories novella, Question of Solace. It includes all of Green's short work not set in the Nightside.

== Screenplays ==
- Judas Ghost
