= The Void (2016 film) =

2016 Canadian horror film

- Theatrical release poster
- Directed by: Steven Kostanski; Jeremy Gillespie
- Written by: Steven Kostanski; Jeremy Gillespie
- Produced by: Casey Walker; Jonathan Bronfman
- Starring: Aaron Poole; Kenneth Welsh; Daniel Fathers; Kathleen Munroe; Ellen Wong; Evan Stern; Trish Rainone; Mik Byskov
- Cinematography: Samy Inayeh
- Edited by: Cam McLauchlin
- Music by: Blitz//Berlin; Joseph Murray; Menalon Music; Lodewijk Vos
- Production company: Cave Painting Pictures
- Distributed by: D Films (Canada)
- Release dates: September 22, 2016 (Fantastic Fest); April 7, 2017 (Canada)
- Running time: 84 minutes
- Country: Canada
- Language: English
- Budget: >$82,510 (Note: The creature effects were funded through Indiegogo while the film was funded through traditional channels by the production company.)
- Box office: $377,624 worldwide

The Void is a 2016 Canadian Lovecraftian horror film written and directed by Steven Kostanski and Jeremy Gillespie, and produced by Jonathan Bronfman and Casey Walker. It stars Aaron Poole, Kenneth Welsh, Daniel Fathers, Kathleen Munroe, and Ellen Wong. The plot follows a small group of people who become trapped in a hospital by a gathering of hooded cultists and grotesque creatures.

The creature effects were crowdfunded on Indiegogo and raised $82,510, while the film's funding was done through traditional channels by the production company. It premiered at the 2016 Fantastic Fest and later at the Toronto After Dark Film Festival. The film was given a limited theatrical release on May 21, 2017, in the United Kingdom and the United States, and on April 17 in Canada, initially opening in 31 theaters before expanding to 50. It earned approximately $55,000 on its opening weekend, and grossed $149,365 during its release. The Void received positive reviews from critics, with many citing comparison to horror films from the 1980s.

== Plot ==
James flees from a farmhouse and escapes into the woods. A screaming woman tries to follow, but is wounded by a gunshot. Lying on the ground, she is doused with gasoline and set on fire by Vincent and Simon. Deputy Sheriff Daniel Carter is on duty, sitting in his patrol car when he finds James crawling along the road and rushes him to the local hospital, which has been largely abandoned following a fire, where his estranged wife Allison Fraser works as a nurse. At the hospital are Dr. Richard Powell, nurse Beverly, intern Kim, pregnant patient Maggie, her grandfather Ben, and patient Cliff; with the staff at the hospital working as a skeleton crew. Daniel discovers an entranced Beverly murdering Cliff, her face flayed of skin. Beverly moves toward Daniel who shoots her dead. Daniel collapses due to a seizure and experiences a strange vision.

State trooper Mitchell enters the hospital to collect James after discovering the bloody scene at the farmhouse. Daniel goes outside to call in Beverly's death from his patrol car but is tackled and stabbed by a robed cultist. He manages to return to the hospital as cultists surround the building. James, Daniel, and Mitchell find that Beverly's corpse has transformed into a tentacled creature. Vincent and Simon enter the lobby and hold the group at gunpoint, demanding to get to James. James takes Maggie hostage to protect himself and stabs Powell, who falls to the floor and dies. The Beverly-Creature appears and takes Mitchell, its tentacles penetrating his body. Vincent and Simon kill the Beverly-Creature and regroup with the others in the lobby, setting Mitchell's body on fire. Vincent and Simon accompany Daniel to retrieve a shotgun from a patrol car, while Allison ventures into the basement to collect medical supplies for delivering Maggie's baby. Powell, no longer dead, manages to capture Allison. Daniel and Vincent go to search for her and find photographs and files indicating Powell was the cult's leader. Powell phones Daniel from the in-house morgue, taunting him and mentioning the vision Daniel experienced while unconscious.

Kim and Ben stay with Maggie while Daniel, Vincent, and Simon interrogate James. James explains that Powell has the power to transform people. The three men force James to come with them downstairs. Allison regains consciousness on an operating table where Powell explains he has found a way to defy death after the loss of his daughter Sarah. Having flayed off his face, Powell shows Allison that something now grows inside her belly. Daniel, Vincent, Simon, and James find a hidden area in the basement and end up surrounded by deformed corpses brought back to life. One of the creatures kills James as the other three men are separated.

As Maggie enters labor, Kim hesitates to perform a C-section. As Ben pleads with Kim, Maggie stands and slits his throat, revealing she is carrying Dr. Powell's child. Kim hides as cultists enter the building and Maggie leaves to join Powell. Daniel finds Allison in the operating room pregnant. He sees a tentacled creature extending from her body. Powell's voice speaks to Daniel, who attacks his wife's mutated remains with an axe. Daniel is transported to a morgue room with a glowing triangle on the wall. Powell's voice tells Daniel that he found the ability to conquer life and death through a rite that enabled him to contact entities older than time itself. Powell promises that Daniel can have his child back if he is willing to die first.

Maggie appears and stabs Daniel who is injured but alive. Powell appears skinless and partly mutated in front of the triangle as Maggie kneels before him. Powell recites an incantation before the triangle as a now frightened Maggie's torso explodes, giving birth to the Sarah-Creature. Vincent and Simon arrive and battle it. The Sarah-Creature overcomes Vincent, but he covers it in isopropyl alcohol, allowing Simon to set them both on fire with a flare. Powell tells Daniel he can be with Allison if he stops resisting and "let go". Daniel refuses and tackles him, leading both men to tumble into the void. Meanwhile, the Sarah-Creature pursues Simon, who escapes and is teleported back to the hospital to reunite safely with Kim. Daniel and Allison are shown holding hands in another world beneath a black pyramid while Powell's fate is left unknown.

== Cast ==
- Aaron Poole as Daniel Carter
- Kenneth Welsh as Dr. Richard Powell
- Daniel Fathers as The Father / Vincent
- Kathleen Munroe as Allison Fraser
- Ellen Wong as Kim
- Mik Byskov as The Son / Simon
- Grace Munro as Maggie
- Evan Stern as James
- James Millington as Ben
- Art Hindle as Mitchell
- Stephanie Belding as Beverly
- Matt Kennedy as Cliff Robertson

== Production ==
Since 2000, the Canadian film groups referring to themselves as Astron-6 began creating comedic horror films. Their films included Manborg, Father's Day and The Editor. The Void differed from the previous films being serious in tone, which led the group to not present it under the Astron-6 name.

Jeremy Gillespie was initially working at Pinewood on a floor below where Guillermo del Toro was working on the unfinished film At the Mountains of Madness, recalling hearing him state that he wanted to do a H.P. Lovecraft film in a way that had not been done before. After hearing this, Gillespie felt that this "sort of got the wheels in my mind working, trying to think of what that might be. So that was sort of where the imagery was birthed. All of this stuff relating to pyramids and triangles is left ambiguous, for the audience to interpret as they would, intentionally."

Gillespie and Kostanski managed to crowdfund the money they needed to build the practical creatures that appear onscreen effects. Other assistance came from the team working on David Ayer's Suicide Squad which was shooting in Toronto. Gillespie served as assistant art director and Kostanski as a special makeup effects artist on the film, which led to members of the special effects team on Suicide Squad to work on The Void. Gillespie later declared The Void as a difficult production, noting that "Every single thing was the biggest challenge. It was a soul-crushing nightmare. Everybody was pushed to the limit on this movie. The one ray of hope we got was the cast, which came together at the last second. They were easy to deal with." The Void was set to shoot in Canada on November 17, 2015.

At the American Film Market, XYZ Films and CAA were set to handle the North American deals.

Filmed in Sault Ste. Marie at the former location of Sir James Dunn Collegiate and Vocational School. The school was demolished in 2016.

== Release ==
The Void had its world premiere at Fantastic Fest on September 22, 2016. The film received its Canadian premiere at Toronto After Dark Film Festival on October 17. Screen Media Films negotiated the deal with XYZ Films and CAA for both theatrical and video on demand day-and-date release of The Void in the United States on April 7, 2017. The Void opened in Winnipeg on March 31, Toronto on April 1, Ottawa and Calgary on April 7 and Vancouver on April 8 where it was distributed by D Films.

The soundtrack of The Void was released by Death Waltz Recordings on 4 October 2017.

== Reception ==
On review aggregator website Rotten Tomatoes, it holds a 77% approval rating based on 75 reviews, and an average rating of 6.1/10. The site's critical consensus reads, "The Void offers a nostalgic rush for fans of low-budget 1980s horror—and legitimate thrills for hardcore genre enthusiasts of all ages." On Metacritic, The Void received a rating of 62 out of 100 based on 14 reviews, indicating "generally favorable reviews".

Writing in Fangoria, Elijah Taylor gave the film a positive review, specifically praising that "practical effects are not obscured, not glimpsed partially through a flashing light or a shaky handicam. They're showcased front and center, with the confidence of a team that knows their monsters have more weight and impact than the myriad CGI scares that have become the standard in modern horror." and that it was a film that "demands multiple viewings."

Kim Newman of Screen Daily compared the film to previous works Bio-Cop from ABCs of Death 2 and Manborg, stating that the directors "remain in pastiche mode, but tone down the humour to try for serious suspense and Lovecraftian horror - with a pleasing reliance on memorably gruesome physical effects rather than CGI." Newman concluded that the film "offers good shock/uck moments and a nicely unpredictable plot, even if a few crucial relationships are sketchily established, slightly undermining audience investment in the horrors."

Chris Hewett of Empire gave the film 3 stars out of 5, stating that the "central story hinges on a series of outlandish coincidences, too many of the cast of characters struggle to make an impact, and the pacing is a tad too ponderous to really grip." The review found that as the film became more close to a creature feature, "the directors' love of old-school, honest-to-goodness, practical FX is a huge boon" and the directors are "worth keeping an eye on", as they "know their way around an arresting image, whether it’s a group of masked figures eerily lit by the cold, flashing light of a cop car, or a killer nonchalantly sliding a scalpel into someone’s eye".

The Globe and Mail's Brad Wheeler gave the film 2.5 stars out of 4, calling the plot "hard to follow" and that the creatures in the film "are low-lit, which probably has more to do with budget realities than aesthetic choice" and that the film was "unsettling and not jokey at all, the hell of The Void will be heaven to some." Reviewing the film for Now, Norman Wilner found that the directors were still "operating in their referential comfort zone" with the film being "a savvy mashup of at least four John Carpenter pictures." and that it was still "its own entity: an effective, resourceful nightmare that convinces you the apocalypse is clawing just out of sight, beyond the edge of the screen."

Giving the film 1.5 stars out of 4, Simon Abrams of RogerEbert.com was disappointed with a film he thought he should like. Calling the plot "wafer-thin", and the style "patchy and flimsy", and "a work by a group of young, unformed voices."

== See also ==
- List of Canadian films of 2016
- List of horror films of 2016
