= Deathstalker War =

1997 novel by Simon R. Green

- Cover of the 1997 first edition UK paperback release of Deathstalker War
- Author: Simon R Green
- Cover artist: Peter Mennim
- Language: English
- Series: Deathstalker
- Genre: Science fiction
- Publisher: Gollancz/Vista
- Publication date: 1997 (1st edition)
- Publication place: UK
- Media type: Print (paperback)
- Pages: 570
- ISBN: 0-575-60061-6
- OCLC: 36747121
- Preceded by: Deathstalker Rebellion
- Followed by: Deathstalker Honour

Deathstalker War is a science fiction novel by British author Simon R Green. The fourth in a series of nine novels, Deathstalker War is part homage to – and part parody/satire of – the classic space operas of the 1950s, and deals with the timeless themes of honour, love, courage and betrayal.

Set in a far-future fictional universe, Deathstalker War develops the plot and themes introduced in the previous books in the series.
