= Mennim =

Mennim is a surname. Notable people with the surname include:

- Michael Mennim (1921–2005), English architect and author with an interest in historical buildings
- Peter Mennim (born 1955), English artist, son of Michael
