= Deathstalker Honour =

1998 novel by Simon R. Green

- Cover of the 1998 first edition UK paperback release of Deathstalker Honour
- Author: Simon R Green
- Cover artist: Peter Mennim
- Language: English
- Series: Deathstalker
- Genre: Science fiction
- Publisher: Gollancz/Vista
- Publication date: 1998 (1st edition)
- Publication place: United Kingdom
- Media type: Print (paperback)
- Pages: 621
- ISBN: 0-575-60178-7
- OCLC: 39505048
- Preceded by: Deathstalker War
- Followed by: Deathstalker Destiny

Deathstalker Honour is a science fiction novel by British author Simon R Green. The fifth in a series of nine novels, Deathstalker Honour is part homage to – and part parody/satire of – the classic space operas of the 1950s, and deals with the timeless themes of honour, love, courage and betrayal.

Set in a far-future fictional universe, Deathstalker Honour develops the plot and themes introduced in the previous books in the series.
