= Deathstalker Rebellion =

1996 novel by Simon R. Green

- Cover of the 1996 first edition UK paperback release of Deathstalker Rebellion
- Author: Simon R Green
- Cover artist: Steve Crisp
- Language: English
- Series: Deathstalker
- Genre: Science fiction
- Publisher: Gollancz/Vista
- Publication date: 1996 (1st edition)
- Publication place: United Kingdom
- Media type: Print (paperback)
- Pages: 568
- ISBN: 0-575-60011-X
- OCLC: 34731181
- Preceded by: Deathstalker
- Followed by: Deathstalker War

Deathstalker Rebellion is a science fiction novel by British author Simon R Green. The third in a series of nine novels, Deathstalker Rebellion is part homage to – and part parody/satire of – the classic space operas of the 1950s, and deals with the timeless themes of honour, love, courage and betrayal.

== Plot introduction ==
Set in a far-future fictional universe, Deathstalker Rebellion develops the plot and themes introduced in Deathstalker.
