= Fatal Vision (disambiguation) =

Fatal Vision is the 1983 true crime book by Joe McGinniss which lies at the center of the Fatal Vision controversy.

Fatal Vision also may refer to:

- Fatal Vision (miniseries), a 1984 TV miniseries adaptation of McGinniss' book
- Fatal Vision (goggles)

== See also ==
- Fatal Visions
- Jeffrey R. MacDonald, defendant in Fatal Vision murder case
