= In a Violent Nature =

2024 film by Chris Nash

- Theatrical release poster
- Directed by: Chris Nash
- Written by: Chris Nash
- Produced by: Peter Kuplowsky; Shannon Hanmer
- Starring: Ry Barrett; Andrea Pavlovic; Cameron Love; Reece Presley; Liam Leone; Charlotte Creaghan; Lea Rose Sebastianis; Sam Roulston; Alexander Oliver; Lauren Taylor
- Cinematography: Pierce Derks
- Edited by: Alex Jacobs
- Production companies: Zygote Pictures; Shudder; Low Sky Productions
- Distributed by: IFC Films; Shudder; Renaissance Media
- Release dates: January 24, 2024 (Sundance); May 31, 2024 (United States)
- Running time: 94 minutes
- Country: Canada
- Language: English
- Box office: $4.6 million

In a Violent Nature is a 2024 Canadian slasher film written and directed by Chris Nash, and produced by Zygote Pictures, Shudder, and Low Sky Productions. Described as an "ambient slasher", it follows a mute killer who is accidentally resurrected from his grave in the Ontario wilderness by a group of teenagers, whom he then begins stalking and murdering. The events depicted are largely observed from the killer's perspective.

In a Violent Nature premiered in the Midnight section of the Sundance Film Festival on January 22, 2024. The film was released theatrically in the United States and Canada by IFC Films on May 31, and was released on the streaming service Shudder later in the year. Opening on 1,426 screens, it marked IFC Films's widest theatrical release to date, and grossed $3 million in its first week. It received positive reviews from film critics. A sequel, In a Violent Nature: Part 2, is in production.

== Plot ==
A group of friends—Kris, Colt, Troy, Evan, Ehren, Brodie, and Aurora—discover a locket hanging on the remains of a fire tower, which Troy pockets. Moments later, the corpse of a mass murderer, identified as Johnny, rises from the ground. Enraged, he roams the woods in search of the locket and hears an argument between a hunter and a park ranger. Johnny enters the hunter's house, where he sees a necklace that he mistakes for his locket, triggering a brief memory of his father. The homeowner returns and runs away at the sight of Johnny, but is caught and killed.

Johnny approaches the group sitting around a campfire, drawn to their location by the sound of gunfire they made. Ehren recounts the legend of Johnny. Decades prior, Johnny, the developmentally delayed son of a local merchant, fell to his death from the firetower in a prank gone wrong. Despite attempts to cover it up, his father discovers the truth and is killed confronting one of the individuals involved. Subsequent murders were attributed to his vengeful spirit. Later that night, Ehren is killed by Johnny. He uses Ehren's corpse to break into and ransack a nearby park ranger office for weapons and an antique firefighter mask.

The next day, Johnny kills Brodie in the water near a lake dock, and Aurora at an overlook. Later, Troy, Colt, Kris, and Evan argue about the circumstances of their friends' disappearances. As the argument escalates, Troy throws the car keys into the woods, which Johnny recovers. Colt walks into the woods to try to retrieve them, but instead finds Johnny's dropped axe. Colt picks up the axe and returns to the others, showing it to them while they continue arguing about the other strange things they've seen. While playing with the keychain, Johnny hears Troy make disparaging remarks toward Colt's deceased father. Enraged, he walks towards the group just as Colt and Kris ride off towards the range station, and injures Troy with the axe. While inside the cabin, Evan notices this encounter, prompting him to exit and shoot Johnny before he can kill Troy. The pair run into the woods, but are both soon killed after Johnny regains consciousness and begins chasing them.

After Colt and Kris arrive at the ranger station, a park ranger investigating the scene notices the locket around Kris's neck and explains that the locket is what keeps Johnny's soul at rest. At the same time, Johnny emerges from the woods and attacks the group and kills the park ranger with a gas-powered log splitter while Colt and Kris escape.

The two return to the fire tower and plan to trap Johnny, but Colt is killed in the process. Kris, too shocked to implement the plan, leaves the locket hanging on a gas canister and flees into the woods. Kris injures her leg and limps to a nearby road where a woman picks her up. The woman notices Kris' injury and insists on stopping to apply a tourniquet. A panicked Kris pleads with her to keep driving, waiting for Johnny to appear from the nearby woods, but he does not. Back at the fire tower, the gas canister is shown, missing Johnny's locket.

== Cast ==
- Ry Barrett as Johnny
- Andrea Pavlovic as Kris
- Cameron Love as Colt
- Reece Presley as the ranger
- Liam Leone as Troy
- Charlotte Creaghan as Aurora
- Lea Rose Sebastianis as Brodie
- Sam Roulston as Ehren
- Alexander Oliver as Evan
- Timothy Paul McCarthy as Chuck
- Lauren-Marie Taylor (Note: Credited as Lauren Taylor) as the woman

== Production ==
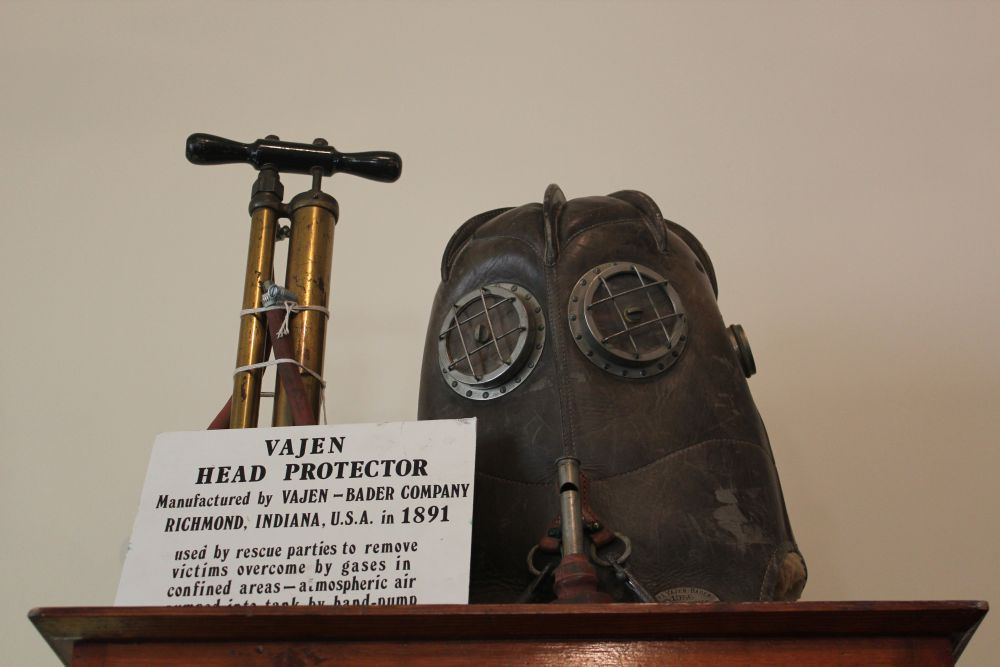
A Vajen Bader smoke protector helmet, similar to that used by the film's villain

Filming initially took place in the Kawartha Lakes area of Central Ontario, Canada, in 2021, but Nash later recalled that the locale "just felt like it wasn't hitting the right note for us". The film was ultimately shot in Algoma District, Ontario, near Sault Ste. Marie.

Commentators have drawn comparisons between In a Violent Nature and slow cinema. Nash drew inspiration for the film's style from the Gus Van Sant-directed films Gerry (2002), Elephant (2003) and Last Days (2005), which Nash characterizes as "slower, more methodical, more deliberate and follow characters through a scene." Nash cited the work of director Terrence Malick as an influence. Nash was also inspired by the Austrian horror film Angst.

In a Violent Nature emphasizes static long take shots. "We always wanted to treat this almost like a nature documentary," Nash said of the film's stylistic approach. "It's lulling you into a sense [that] the danger isn't quite there. When you see tourists getting really close to bears, they're just like, 'Oh, no, look, it's not doing anything. It's fine.' And then all of a sudden, the bear just turns around and charges at you. You're way too defenseless and you just have no idea that they're capable of this much power and brutality." Additionally, the film's initial concept originated as a "meta-sequel within a fictional slasher series."

Nash has said that he chose to shoot the film in Academy ratio because "that's how I watched all the slashers as a kid on VHS... That's the slasher aspect ratio." Nash chose not to use a traditional musical score, instead relying primarily on ambient sounds from the surrounding forest. He said the decision was intended to maintain an objective viewpoint and avoid influencing the audience's emotional response.

== Release ==
In a Violent Nature had its world premiere on January 22, 2024, at the Sundance Film Festival, as part of the festival's "Midnight" program. An outdoor promotional screening was held on New York City's Governors Island on May 18, 2024, with actors Ry Barrett, Andrea Pavlovic, and Lauren-Marie Taylor in attendance. The film was theatrically released in the United States by IFC Films on May 31, 2024. It was released digitally on June 28, 2024, and was released on the Shudder streaming service on September 13 to coincide with Friday the 13th. It was released in the United Kingdom by Altitude Film Distribution on July 12, 2024.

=== Box office ===
IFC Films released In a Violent Nature in North America on May 31, 2024 on 1,426 screens, marking the widest opening release of a film for the studio. It earned $410,000 in Thursday night previews. It went on to gross $2.1 million at the North American box office during its opening weekend, marking the second-best opening for IFC Films after Late Night with the Devil. By June 21, 2024, the film had earned $4,192,513 at the box office.

=== Critical response ===
On the review aggregator website Rotten Tomatoes, 79% of 187 critics' reviews are positive, with an average rating of 6.6/10. The website's consensus reads: "As single-mindedly focused on mayhem as its demonic monster, In a Violent Nature serves up a deliciously disgusting feast for gore aficionados." Metacritic, which uses a weighted average, assigned the film a score of 68 out of 100, based on 26 critics, indicating "generally favorable" reviews.

Variety's Dennis Harvey wrote that the film's "stripped-down approach to a familiar gist has a distinctiveness that is impressive, and is sure to please fans who are always up for a new slasher film—but wish most of them weren't so interchangeable." Cheryl Eddy of Gizmodo called it "a fascinating artistic experiment and genre fans should definitely give it a look. But it may also make you wish you were watching a traditional slasher—for something more fun and entertaining, may we suggest Friday the 13th Part 2?—instead." Jeannette Catsoulis of The New York Times praised the film's "dreamlike" atmosphere, concluding: "Nash has attempted an ambitious blend of art house and slaughterhouse whose rug-pulling ending will polarize, even as its moody logic prevails."

Michael Gingold of Rue Morgue wrote that the film's style "isn't quite a reinvention of the form, but it creates a different and very effective kind of tension." David Ehrlich of IndieWire gave the film a grade of "C", writing that the film "derives its semi-hypnotic power from the disconnect it creates between the sheer movieness of what happens and the somnambulant nonchalance with which it all goes down. The effect is interesting in theory, but largely unsatisfying in execution (pun very much intended)."

In a list published on June 20, 2024, Variety ranked In a Violent Nature the best horror film of the year thus far, with writer William Earl noting: "Amid the outrageous kills and crisp camerawork lies a sharp satire laced with empathy, beauty and genuine fear."

== Sequel ==
In July 2024, a sequel, In a Violent Nature: Part 2, was announced at San Diego Comic-Con by IFC and Shudder. Peter Kuplowsky and Shannon Hamner were announced as producers, while Nash was to return to write the screenplay. Principal photography began in Canada in September 2025, with Ry Barrett returning as Johnny. Other stars for the film included Lucas Nguyen, Olivia Scriven, Laurie Babin, Fionn Laird, Donald MacLean Jr., and Evan Marsh.
