= Blue Moon Rising =

Blue Moon Rising may refer to:

- Blue Moon Rising (novel), a novel by Simon R. Green
- Blue Moon Rising (film), a 2010 sport documentary film
- "Blue Moon Rising", a song by Gomez from Liquid Skin
- "Blue Moon Rising" (song), a 2020 song by the English band Noel Gallagher's High Flying Birds
