= Frankie Freako =

- Film poster
- Directed by: Steven Kostanski
- Written by: Steven Kostanski
- Produced by: Steven Kostanski; Melanie Murray; Pasha Patriki
- Starring: Conor Sweeney; Matthew Kennedy; Kristy Wordsworth; Adam Brooks
- Cinematography: Pierce Derks
- Edited by: Steven Kostanski
- Music by: Blitz//Berlin
- Production companies: Hangar 18 Media; Astron-6
- Distributed by: Raven Banner Entertainment; Shout! Studios
- Release date: July 24, 2024 (Fantasia)
- Running time: 83 minutes
- Country: Canada
- Language: English

Frankie Freako is a 2024 Canadian horror comedy film written and directed by Steven Kostanski. It is produced by Astron-6 and distributed by Shout! Studios. It stars Conor Sweeney, who must battle the pint-sized forces of evil that get unleashed through his phone line, led by the maniacal rock 'n' roll goblin Frankie Freako. The film was inspired by 1980s "little creature" horror films such as Gremlins and Ghoulies. and marks Astron-6's first feature film in ten years after the release of The Editor.

It premiered at the 28th Fantasia International Film Festival, before going into commercial release on October 4, 2024. The film received generally positive reviews from critics.

== Premise ==
Set in the 1980s, the film stars Conor Sweeney as Conor, a workaholic yuppie who sets out to prove that he can be spontaneous and fun after being accused of being uptight by his wife Kristina (Kristy Wordsworth) and boss Mr. Buechler (Adam Brooks); seeing a television advertisement for a party hotline run by Frankie Freako (Matthew Kennedy), a strange alien creature, Conor decides to call it only to be swept up into intergalactic chaos.

== Cast ==
- Conor Sweeney as Conor, a workaholic uptight yuppie
- Kristy Wordsworth as Kristina, Conor's wife
- Adam Brooks as Mr. Buechler, Conor's boss
  - Brooks also voices Boink Bardo
- Rob Schrab as Robe Delaney

=== Voices ===
- Matthew Kennedy as Frankie Freako
- Meredith Sweeney as Dottie Dunko
- Rich Evans as Freaklord President Munch
- Stuart Wellington as Major FK
- Dan McCoy as FK #1
- Elliot Kalan as FK #2
- Mike Kostanski as Crunch
- Jay Bauman as Street Freako
- Joshua Turpin as Uber Munch
- Mike Stoklasa as the Freako tutorial narrator
- Brandi Boulet as the commercial narrator

== Critical response ==
Barry Hertz of The Globe and Mail called the film a "cinematic smoothie made possible by tossing Gremlins, Little Monsters, The Gate, Critters, Ghoulies Go to College, Garbage Pail Kids, and a heaping scoop of Puppet Master into a blender – and then forgetting to put the lid on, so that the kitchen is painted by the confection’s sloppy chunks." He concluded that "for those in on the joke – and this is really a one-joke movie, maybe two – the punchline of Frankie Freako hits incredibly hard. So much so that it seems the movie is not a 2024 release, but one teleported here from an alternate version of our past. You already know, though, whether this trip is worth taking."

Matthew Jackson of Paste wrote that "Frankie Freako certainly has its limitations. It’s packaged as light sci-fi/horror-comedy fare, and functions as such, its larger nostalgic commentary existing only as background to an excuse to have a lot of fun with creatures and sight gags. It never quite goes as far as you’d hope in the first two acts, and by the time its fullest ambitions show up, it feels just a hair too late. Still, it’s hard to be upset by those things when everyone involved is clearly having so much fun. Frankie Freako is an example of what happens when a gifted genre filmmaker understands that throwback movies are about so much more than song choices and big hair, and that depth of understanding produces delightful results. It’s Gremlins by way of Tim & Eric, and that alone is enough to make it one of the year’s most fun cinematic curiosities."

For Original Cin, John Kirk wrote that "while I can appreciate the homage to 1986, this might have been better received if it was actually 1986. Anyone who remembers the films that came out of that decade remembers the cheesy special effects but today, they get in the way of telling a story even though the intent was to present a film from that time. But it’s something to talk about, that’s for sure."
