= In a Violent Nature: Part 2 =

2026 film by Nate Wilson and Chris Nash

- Teaser poster
- Directed by: Nate Wilson; Chris Nash
- Written by: Chris Nash
- Produced by: Peter Kuplowsky; Shannon Hanmer; Chris Nash
- Starring: Ry Barrett; Lucas Nguyen; Olivia Scriven; Laurie Babin; Fionn Laird; Donald MacLean Jr.; Evan Marsh
- Production companies: Zygote Pictures; Shudder
- Distributed by: Independent Film Company; Shudder; Renaissance Media
- Release dates: September 18, 2026 (Fantastic Fest); February 12, 2027 (Canada)
- Running time: 90 minutes
- Country: Canada
- Language: English

In a Violent Nature: Part 2 is a 2026 Canadian slasher film directed by Nate Wilson and Chris Nash, the latter also serving as writer and producer. It is a sequel to In a Violent Nature (2024), and stars Ry Barrett reprising his role as the undead serial killer Johnny from the first film, while Lucas Nguyen, Olivia Scriven, Laurie Babin, Fionn Laird, Donald MacLean Jr. and Evan Marsh stars in supporting roles.

In a Violent Nature: Part 2 premiered at Fantastic Fest on September 18, 2026, and is set to be released by Independent Film Company and Shudder on February 12, 2027.

== Premise ==
As Johnny commences his violent rampage at a summer camp, an outcast camper is forced to spend the night with his counselor sister and her friends at their annual end-of-season party.

== Cast ==
- Ry Barrett as Johnny
- Lucas Nguyen
- Olivia Scriven
- Laurie Babin
- Fionn Laird
- Donald MacLean Jr.
- Evan Marsh

== Production ==
In July 2024, a sequel to In a Violent Nature (2024) was announced at San Diego Comic-Con, with IFC Films and Shudder developing the project.

Principal photography began in Canada in September 2025, with Ry Barrett as reprising his role as Johnny, alongside Lucas Nguyen, Olivia Scriven, Laurie Babin, Fionn Laird, Donald MacLean Jr., and Evan Marsh.

== Release ==
A work-in-progress cut of the film had a surprise screening at Fantastic Fest on September 18, 2026. It will be released in theaters on February 12, 2027.

== Reception ==
=== Critical response ===
On the review aggregator website Rotten Tomatoes, 64% of 11 critics' reviews are positive, with an average rating of 5.5/10.
