= Deathstalker Destiny =

Science fiction novel

- Cover of the 1999 first edition UK paperback release of Deathstalker Destiny
- Author: Simon R Green
- Cover artist: Peter Mennim
- Language: English
- Series: Deathstalker
- Genre: Science fiction
- Publisher: Orion/Millennium
- Publication date: 1999 (1st edition)
- Publication place: United Kingdom
- Media type: Print (paperback)
- Pages: 473
- ISBN: 1-85798-877-9
- OCLC: 43822443
- Preceded by: Deathstalker Honour
- Followed by: Deathstalker Legacy

Deathstalker Destiny is a science fiction novel by British author Simon R Green. The sixth in a series of nine novels, Deathstalker Destiny is part homage to – and part parody/satire of – the classic space operas of the 1950s, and deals with the themes of honour, love, courage and betrayal.

Set in a far-future fictional universe, Deathstalker Destiny develops the plot and themes introduced in the previous books in the series.
