= Casey Walker (director) =

Canadian film and television director

Casey Walker is a Canadian film and television director from Thunder Bay, Ontario, whose feature directorial debut film, A Little Bit Zombie, was released in 2012.

== Career ==
As a novice director whose only prior credit was the short film The Morning After, Walker initially had difficulty securing funding to make A Little Bit Zombie, and launched his own independent crowdfunding platform, My Million Dollar Movie, in 2006. The site attracted more than 200,000 hits and secured $20,000 in donations on its first day alone, and was ultimately successful in raising almost $2 million by the time the film entered production in 2011.

The film was shot in the Sudbury area in 2011, and premiered at the 2012 Victoria Film Festival. The film subsequently won several awards from Canadian and international film festivals, most notably Best Feature Film at the 2012 Canadian Filmmakers' Festival.

Both before and after making A Little Bit Zombie, he also worked in television directing episodes of Taste Buds, Prank Patrol, The Adrenaline Project, Survive This, How to Be Indie, Fool Canada, The Hardy Boys and Overlord and the Underwoods.

He has also been a producer or executive producer of films such as The Void, Pyewacket, Die in a Gunfight and In a Violent Nature.

His second and third feature films were both released in 2026, with Home Bodies premiering at the 30th Fantasia International Film Festival, and Ithaqua slated for FrightFest London.
