= Deathstalker (series) =

Series of science fiction novels by Simon R. Green

The Deathstalker series of space opera novels, by British author Simon R. Green, was written during the 1990s and early 2000s. Although referred to by a single name, the series consists of two major episodes (each dealing with a different member of the Deathstalker Clan), and other associated novels providing a backstory to the characters and events of the fictional universe.

The first episode, comprising five books, tells the story of how Owen Deathstalker, reluctant heir to the ancient Deathstalker name and minor historian, came to lead a galactic rebellion against the powerful and corrupt empire in which he lives. The second episode is set 200 years after the first, and follows Lewis Deathstalker, a distant relative to Owen. Three additional novels, eventually republished as an anthology, act as a prequel of sorts – although they contain no mention of the Deathstalker family they expand on other important characters and provide further insight into the workings of the empire.

== Books ==
Both major Deathstalker episodes are classic examples of an epic form of space opera. Each deals not only with its protagonist but also develops a large cast of supporting characters, many of whom are given as much depth as the hero. Even minor characters often have significant portions of a novel devoted to them. The series as a whole spans over 200 years of Green's fictional universe, and is known for its flamboyant style of narrative. Partly a parody of the 1950s space-opera genre, the Deathstalker novels are also a satirical take on dictatorship, fascism, fashion, established religion and the media.

=== Setting ===
The series is set in a far-future, fictional universe, dominated by a vast and powerful human empire that has fallen from its ancient beginnings into cruelty, decadence and oppression. Alien species when encountered are subjugated or exterminated; internal dissent is ruthlessly put down, and power is concentrated in the hands of a psychotic empress (known as the "Iron Bitch") and a number of aristocratic families, or clans.

Under the justification of protecting the empire from external threats, the empress maintains the status quo by playing off different groups against one another, preventing any organisation from becoming powerful enough to challenge her rule. Cloning is commonplace, with clones being regarded as non-people for use as expendable slave labour. Some people, known generically as espers, have various psychic powers including telekinesis, telepathy and teleportation – these, too, are carefully regulated and exploited by the empire.

The vast majority of imperial citizens, while denied many forms of political self-expression, appear to lead fairly normal lives under the fiefdoms of the different clans. The author draws a parallel to certain periods of the Roman Empire, with the citizenry being kept compliant through the use of public holidays and spectacles such as gladiatorial games. Although a parliament exists, its autonomy and influence are trivial – in large part due to the widespread corruption that permeates every facet of the empire's institutions. The empire's official religion, the Church of Christ the Warrior, acts as an arm of the imperial throne and maintains its own military forces to counterbalance those of the clans.

As the series begins, a number of threats have arisen to menace the empire: from within, rebels (including rogue computer hackers known as cyberats), clones and espers have started to fight for their basic human rights, although until their disparate organisations are unified by Owen Deathstalker their efforts are largely ineffective. From without, the empire's current enemy of humanity (a title reserved for the greatest danger to the empire) is Shub – a gestalt of artificial intelligences created by the empire that, upon achieving sentience, went rogue and escaped from imperial control.

=== Prequels ===
==== Deathstalker Prelude ====
(London, Gollancz/Vista 1998; published in the United States as Twilight of the Empire)

An anthology of three novellas (originally published separately) which introduce the empire and set up several plot points that would be developed in later novels. A number of important characters are featured, including the loyalist starship commander Captain John Silence, the traitorous investigator Carrion and Silence's daughter Diana Vertue.

The anthology comprises:

Mistworld (New York, Ace 1992)

The last refuge of fleeing rebels is attacked using an esper plague, in an attempt to bring down the planet's psychic shield – its only defence against the empire.

Ghostworld (New York, Ace 1993)

A crashed alien starship containing invaluable advanced technology is discovered on the dead world of Unseeli, and a team led by the man who originally wiped out the planet's native population is sent to recover it.

Hellworld (New York, Ace 1993)

An expendable expedition is sent to investigate a planet on the galactic rim to ascertain its suitability for future settlement. They encounter a world where biological reality has run haywire.

=== First episode ===
==== Deathstalker ====
(London, Gollancz 1995; New York, Penguin/Roc 1995 simultaneous release)

Owen Deathstalker, the reluctant heir to a warrior name, is living quietly as a historian – until he is declared an outlaw by the whim of the empress and forced to flee his cosy and privileged existence. Discovering the dark reality of an empire that is far removed from his life of comfort and wealth, he finds unlikely allies and comes to the realisation that the empire, and the throne, must be cleansed.

==== Deathstalker Rebellion ====
(London, Gollancz/Vista 1996) As the rebellion against Empress Lionstone, the "Iron Bitch", gathers pace, Owen is instrumental in uniting the disjointed efforts of the various underground groups. The Imperial Homeworld, Golgatha, is attacked by an unidentified alien starship after Owen and his companions inadvertently disable planetary defences as a side effect of a hacker strike against the banking centres of the empire.

==== Deathstalker War ====
(London, Gollancz/Vista 1997) Invasions of the rebel planet Mistworld and Owen's former fiefdom Virimonde by the imperial fleet result in bloody victories and defeats for the rebels, but the growing resistance movement cannot be stopped. An apocalyptic struggle in the streets of Golgotha's main city, the Parade of the Endless, leads up to a final confrontation with the empress herself.

==== Deathstalker Honour ====
(London, Gollancz/Vista 1998) In the aftermath of the rebellion, the old aristocracy is trying to find a place in the new order as the former heroes of the rebellion struggle to rebuild what they have destroyed. Taking advantage of humanity's weakness, old enemies such as the bio-mechanical Hadenmen and the AIs of Shub re-emerge, laying waste to entire star systems. Owen and his companions must not only cope with these, but also the even graver threat posed by a new adversary: the Recreated.

==== Deathstalker Destiny ====
(London, Orion/Millennium 1999) Facing extinction, humankind has to rely once again on the heroes of the rebellion: Shub and the Hadenmen, destroying countless worlds, must be stopped, Owen must rescue his companion Hazel D'Ark from the Blood Runners, and the Recreated must be faced head on. Many plot threads are wrapped up, including the fates of most of the major characters.

=== Second episode ===
==== Deathstalker Legacy ====
(London, Orion/Gollancz 2002) Lewis Deathstalker, the latest in the family line, is a guardian of the new Golden Age ushered in by his long-dead ancestor Owen. However, betrayed by his love for the King's fiancée and finding enemies in unexpected places, it looks like he is destined to retrace his ancestor's footsteps as history begins to repeat itself.

==== Deathstalker Return ====
(New York, Roc 2004) Fleeing through the empire with imperial forces in hot pursuit, Lewis discovers legends from the past and in desperation sets out on an apparently impossible mission – the return of Owen Deathstalker.

==== Deathstalker Coda ====
(New York, Orion 2005) Together the two Deathstalkers must fight to save the empire from its greatest threat: the Terror. Whilst Lewis leads rebel forces in the present, Owen travels back to the past to try to uncover the mysteries behind the current crisis. This is the final book in the Deathstalker saga, and wraps up the remaining loose ends left by the first series.

== Reaction ==
The Deathstalker series has had a mixed reception from reviewers, with Simeon Shoul of the science fiction, fantasy and horror website Infinity Plus describing the novels as "some of the most schlock space opera in the genre", before going on to say: "But, who gives a damn? It works. At times it works magnificently."

Locus magazine states that Green "makes a virtue of taking everything to extremes". The author himself hinted at the extent to which his work should be taken as parodying the genre, saying: "Just because I take some things seriously, it doesn't mean I have to take them too seriously. I firmly believe it does people and institutions good to have the piss taken out of them at regular intervals."

Other reviewers have condemned Green's work out of hand, as comprising "constant logical inconsistencies; character inconsistencies; repetitive redundancy; cardboard characters; "kitchen sink" disease..." John Berlyne, on the sfsite, despite a largely favourable review describes Deathstalker as "a kind of fast food science fiction", catering for mass-market appeal with more attention paid to "'edge of one's seat' thrills" than plotting.

== Influences ==
According to its author, the Deathstalker concept – and specifically the character of Owen Deathstalker – was conceived after watching Casablanca and Star Wars one evening: "It started me thinking; in Star Wars, all these rebel fleets and bases and so on, who's paying for them? What if there was just one man, with no backing, starting a rebellion on his own? And that's where Owen Deathstalker came from."

Green also cites veteran space opera author Leigh Brackett as a particular influence on the style of the Deathstalker series. Other writers he acknowledges include Robert E. Howard, Michael Moorcock, Roger Zelazny, Joseph Delaney, Harlan Ellison and Norman Spinrad.
