= Deadheads (film) =

- Directed by: Brett Pierce; Drew T. Pierce
- Written by: Brett Pierce; Drew T. Pierce
- Produced by: Andy Drummond; Brett Pierce; Drew T. Pierce; Kevin Van Hagen
- Starring: Michael McKiddy; Ross Kidder; Markus Taylor; Thomas Galasso; Natalie Victoria
- Cinematography: Robert Toth
- Edited by: Kevin O'Brien
- Music by: Devin Burrows
- Production company: FroBro Films
- Distributed by: Splendid Film; Eagle Entertainment; Emylia; G2
- Release date: April 29, 2011
- Running time: 100 minutes
- Country: United States
- Language: English

Deadheads is a 2011 American zombie comedy film co-directed, co-written, and co-produced by Brett Pierce and Drew T. Pierce. It stars Michael McKiddy and Ross Kidder as sentient zombies who embark on a road trip.

== Plot ==
Mike and Brent are inexplicably coherent zombies who become self-aware during a zombie attack. As Mike's memories slowly come back to him, he recalls wanting to visit his girlfriend so that he can tell her that he loves her. Brent adopts a feral zombie which he dubs "Cheese", and they set off, not knowing that they are being tracked by an evil corporation. Eventually captured by a zombie hunter hired by the corporation, the boys escape and make their way to Mike's girlfriend, who accepts him despite his condition.

== Cast ==
- Michael McKiddy as Mike Kellerman
- Ross Kidder as Brent Guthrie
- Markus Taylor as Cheese
- Thomas Galasso as Thomas Jeremiah
- Natalie Victoria as Ellie Masterson
- Eden Malyn as Emily
- Benjamin Webster as McDinkle
- Greg Dow as Gillman
- Harry Burkey as Cliff
- Leonard Kelly-Young as Charles
- Kasey Bell as Rob

== Production ==
Production completed in March 2010. The Evil Dead franchise was an inspiration for the directors, brothers whose father worked on the first film in that series.

== Release ==
DeadHeads premiered at the Newport Beach Film Festival on April 29, 2011. After it sold out, the festival scheduled a second screening. It was released on home video in the UK in by Freestyle Digital Media in January 2012, and in the US in March 2012.

== Reception ==
John Marrone of Bloody Disgusting rated it 2.5/5 stars and wrote that it is an unapologetically stupid yet funny film. Gareth Jones of Dread Central rated it 3/5 stars and wrote, "Besides its failings DeadHeads is well shot and directed, suitably appealing, and the laughs that it does deliver (if variably) and likable characters will definitely see you through to the end." Noah Lee of Film Threat rated it 3/5 stars and wrote, "DeadHeads is an amusing, low budget movie that does a lot with what it's been given." Andrew Mack of Twitch Film wrote, "Dead Heads has the right balance of the Zom and the Com." Ben Bussey of Brutal As Hell called it "a genuinely fresh and unexpected approach to the subgenre".
