= Christ Church, York =

Christ Church, Heworth, York
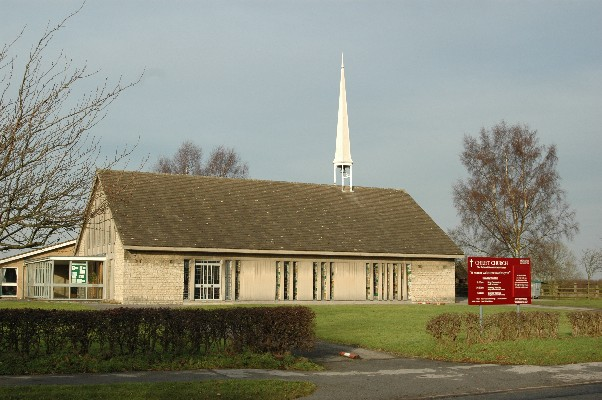
- Christ Church, Heworth, York (photograph by Gareth Foster)
- Christ Church, Heworth, York
- 53°58′25.67″N 1°2′55.05″W
- Location: Heworth, York
- Country: England
- Denomination: Church of England
- Website: heworthchristchurch.com

History
- Dedication: Christ Church

Architecture
- Architect: A. Michael Mennim
- Completed: 1964

Administration
- Province: Province of York
- Diocese: Diocese of York
- Archdeaconry: York
- Deanery: York
- Parish: Heworth Christ Church

Christ Church is located on Stockton Lane in Heworth, York, England. It was opened in March 1964.

It has been called "one of the most pleasing modern churches." The building design is attributed to 'M. Menim;' this may have been A. Michael Mennim, who designed a number of churches in the York area.

The church was originally a daughter church of Holy Trinity Church in Heworth, but was separated into its own ecclesiastical parish in 1998. The church is also used as a dance-hall and meeting place for local community groups, such as the York Minster Scout Group.
