= Home Bodies =

2026 Canadian horror film

- Directed by: Casey Walker
- Written by: Adrian Murray; Marcus Sullivan
- Produced by: Casey Walker; Karen Harnisch
- Starring: Ian Ho; Emma Ho; Ess Hödlmoser
- Cinematography: Bryn McCashin
- Edited by: Simon Thede
- Music by: Blitz//Berlin
- Production companies: Cave Painting Pictures; Film Forge
- Distributed by: VVS Films
- Release date: July 23, 2026 (Fantasia)
- Running time: 97 minutes
- Country: Canada
- Language: English

Home Bodies is a 2026 Canadian science fiction horror film directed by Casey Walker. The film stars Emma Ho and Ian Ho as Red and Blue, young pre-teen twins who have been raised in total isolation in an automated house, whose lives are unexpectedly disrupted by the arrival of a mysterious outsider (Ess Hödlmoser).

The cast also includes Walker as Papa, the voice of the smart home.

== Production ==
The screenplay was written by Adrian Murray and Marcus Sullivan.

The film was shot in December 2025 and January 2026, in Hamilton, Ontario.

== Release ==
It premiered on July 23, 2026, at the 30th Fantasia International Film Festival.

== Critical response ==
Joe Lipsett of Bloody Disgusting wrote that "If there is a weakness to Home Bodies, it is that screenwriters Adrian Murray and Marcus Sullivan establish the world of the film and its corresponding rules in such a way that it is relatively easy to anticipate where the narrative will go. In many ways, the film feels like a parable: a dystopian recreation of the Garden of Eden (with a brother/sister pair filling in for Adam and Eve) or a tweaked version of Cain and Abel. The fact that Pal’s introduction is swiftly followed by violence, distrust, and anarchy is wholly anticipated, though that doesn’t necessarily detract from the overall enjoyment of the film. It feels akin to an episode of The Twilight Zone or Black Mirror.

For Film Obsessive, Michael Fairbanks wrote that "That lack of satisfaction is indicative of Home Bodies as a whole. After the first act sets up all of these intriguing possibilities, the film evolves into little more than a long game of hide and seek. Red and Blue meander their way through the same argument multiple times and get so hung up on Pal that they never really shift into escape mode. Home Bodies would’ve been far more fun as a prison escape picture in which Red, Blue, and Pal come together to outsmart Papa and figure out what lies beyond their cage. Instead, they show relatively little agency and only start to get under the surface when the film has only a precious few minutes remaining. Once we do find out what’s happening, it’s so absurdly dystopian that it almost feels lazy. Casey Walker clearly didn’t want to risk a more elaborate film, so he defaults to making our characters’ circumstances impossible to overcome."
