= Blitz//Berlin =

Canadian trio of composers based in California

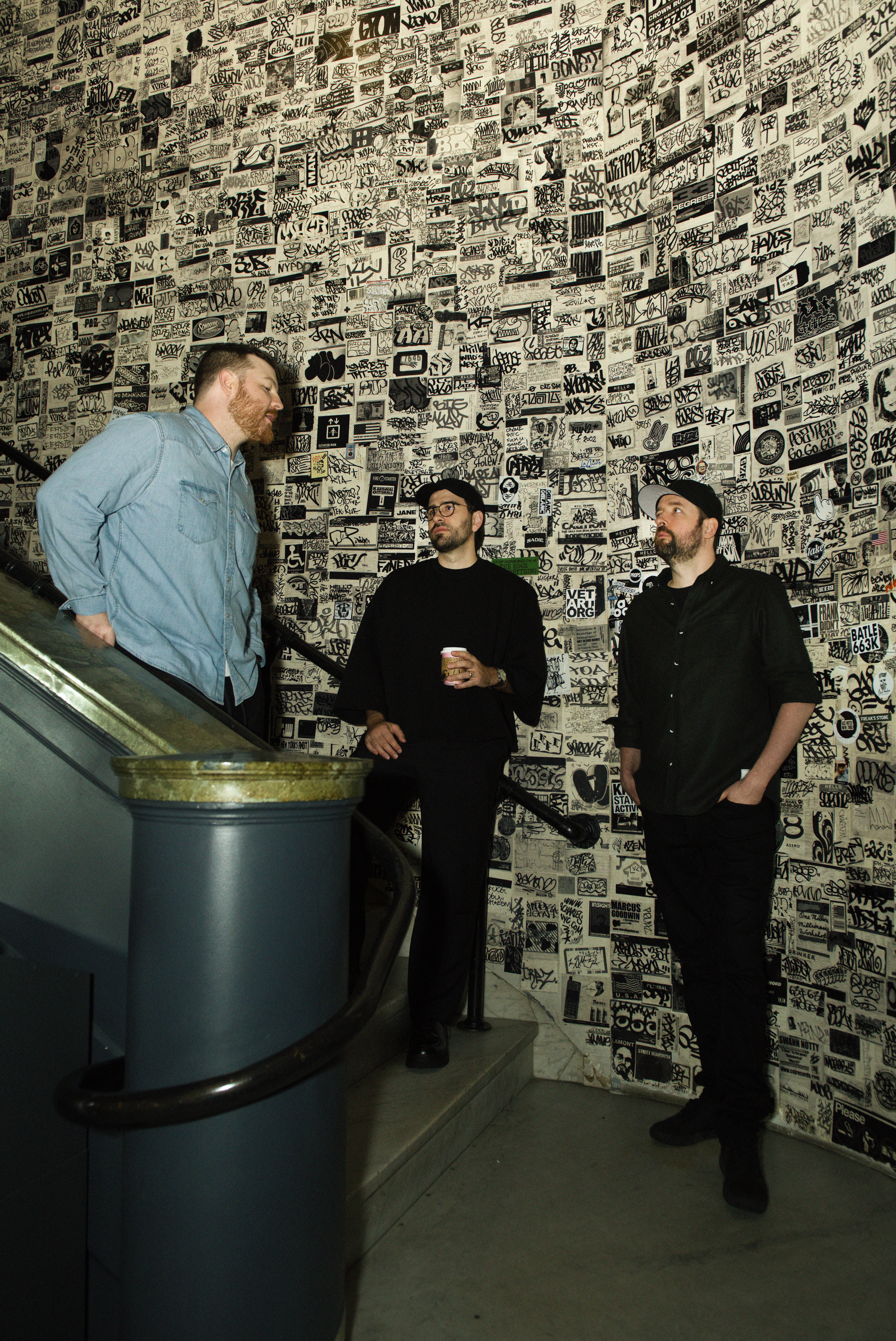

Background information
- Origin: Toronto, Ontario, Canada
- Genres: Electronic / Orchestral
- Years active: 2014–present
- Label: Wax Records / Universal Music
- Members: Martin Macphail; Dean Rode; Tristan Tarr
- Past members: Brendan Walker; Casey Benson
- Website: http://www.blitzberlinmusic.com/

Blitz//Berlin is a trio of Canadian composers based in Los Angeles, California. They are known for composing the music to Blade Runner 2036: Nexus Dawn and Jordan Peele's Scare Tactics, as well as numerous feature films and trailers.

Born and raised in Victoria, British Columbia, high school friends Martin Macphail, Dean Rode, and Tristan Tarr began their film composing career in Toronto, Ontario, in 2014. The group relocated to Los Angeles, California in 2018.

The trio first achieved international recognition in 2016 for their award-winning song "Surfboard Fire" composed for the official trailer for The Girl on the Train, featuring a sample of Kanye West's "Heartless". Soon after, Blitz//Berlin composed the original scores to the critically acclaimed feature films The Void, Still/Born, and Blue Heron. Additionally, their continued trailer work includes Top Gun: Maverick, House Of The Dragon, Alien: Earth, and many others.

In 2021, Blitz//Berlin won the Juno Award for Instrumental album of the year for their album Movements III.

== Discography ==
Original scores
Year	Title	Notes
2014	Extraterrestrial	
2015	Contingent (short)	
2016	Currency (short)	
2016	The Void	
2016	It Stains the Sands Red	
2017	Still/Born	
2017	God Hates a Coward (short)	
2017	2036: Nexus Dawn	
2020	PG: Psycho Goreman	
2021	Witch Hunt	
2021	Superhost	
2021	Day Of The Dead	
2022	The Friendship Game	
2023	Night Shift	
2023	Brooklyn 45	
2023	Simulant	
2024	Frankie Freako	
2024	Scared Shitless	
2024	Scare Tactics	
2025	Sweetness	
2025	Deathstalker	
2025	Queens of the Dead	
2025	Blue Heron	
2025	Silent Night, Deadly Night	
2026	Do Not Enter	
2026	Home Bodies	

Trailer scores
Year	Trailer	Credit
2016	The Girl on the Train	Composer: trailer music
2017	Fifty Shades Darker	Composer: trailer music
2018	Fifty Shades Freed	Composer: trailer music
2018	Red Sparrow	Composer: additional music
2018	Bad Times at the El Royale	Composer: trailer music
2018	The Girl in the Spider's Web	Composer: trailer music
2018	Bird Box	Composer: trailer music
2019	Velvet Buzzsaw	Composer: trailer music
2020	Lovecraft Country	Composer: trailer music
2021	Death on the Nile	Composer: trailer music
2021	Top Gun: Maverick	Composer: trailer music
2022	For All Mankind	Composer: trailer music
2022	House of the Dragon	Composer: trailer music
2024	Will & Harper	Composer: trailer music
2025	Alien: Earth	Composer: trailer music

Studio albums
Year	Title	Record label
2015	Distance	Wax Records / Universal Music
2016	Movements I	Wax Records / Universal Music
2017	Movements II	Wax Records / Universal Music
2019	There Will Be No Miracles Here	Wax Records / Universal Music
2019	Movements III	Wax Records / Universal Music
2024	Beneath The Door Is Open Sky	Wax Records / Universal Music

== Awards ==
Awards
Year	Award	Work	Satus
2016	Clio Awards – Best Use Of Music	Song: Surfboard Fire	Winner (Bronze)
2017	Juno Awards – Instrumental Album Of The Year	Album: Movements I	Nominated
2021	Juno Awards - Instrumental Album Of The Year	Album: Movements III	Winner
2022	Clio Awards - Best Television Promo	Trailer Score	Winner (Bronze)
2022	Clio Awards - Best Theatrical Film Campaign	Trailer Score	Winner (Gold)
2025	Pride Awards - Best Music Score (Queens Of The Dead)	Original Score	Winner
