= A. Michael Mennim =

British architect

Alexander Michael Mennim (2 November 1921 – 22 November 2005) was a York-based British architect and author with a particular interest in historical buildings.

== Personal life ==
Mennim married Dr Eleanor Wilson in 1952 and joined the practice of T. P. Bennett and Partners in London, where they had many large-scale commissions. He also obtained a Town Planning Diploma by part-time study. Mennim "took great pride in being a 'man of York' ... having lived and worked in or near that fine City for the great majority of his life" (see 'Obituary' below). Mennim's funeral was at All Hallows Church, Sutton-on-the-Forest. His wife Eleanor died in May 2005 and therefore All Hallows Church saw the funeral services of them both in the same year. Mennim left three daughters, a son and 11 grandchildren. The son is artist Peter Mennim who painted the 40th Anniversary painting of Wolfson College in which his father appears and which hangs in the Combination Room which his father built.

== Education ==
Mennim attended Pocklington School. By the time he left in 1938 he already had the idea of becoming an architect, having spent a year in articles and a year of draughtsmanship. Then the War started and he joined the Royal Artillery in 1941. After training in England and Scotland he was selected for officer training in 1943 and was commissioned in 1944 in the Royal Artillery and posted to Ambala in India. He took part in jungle warfare in Burma during the advance on Mandalay and was involved in planning for the invasion of Malaya when peace was declared in August 1945.

He was enamoured of India and its architecture and always retained a special liking for Simla. After the war, Mennim he started his professional training in 1947 at the Leeds School of Architecture. He qualified in 1951 as the top student of his year. While in Leeds he formed a friendship with Dr Hugh Plommer (at that time Librarian at the Leeds School of Architecture) who was to have a significant influence on his life in the years to come.

== Initial work ==
After five years in London, Mennim returned to York where he joined a partnership which later became Ferrey and Mennim. He bought a house, Croft Cottage in Sutton-on-the-Forest which was to be the family home for the next 53 years. Ferrey and Mennim were Diocesan Surveyors for the immense Yorkshire diocese which meant that they had under their care around 300 churches of varying ages, each of which had to be fully inspected every five years. This assured a continual supply of work. The partnership grew in size to cope with its many commissions, which concentrated on church-related work including new churches, church halls and schools. The practice also became known for restoration and housing work.

== Wolfson College, Cambridge ==
In the late 1960s Mennim went for an interview at University College, Cambridge where his friend Hugh Plommer was a Founding Fellow. That newly founded College had been seeking an architect to plan its possible future buildings so that they might approach potential benefactors. Its Building Committee, of which Plommer was a member, could not agree on an architect despite the eminence of the architects they had already interviewed and some of whose buildings they had visited. In the hope of resolving the impasse, Plommer put Mennim's name forward.

A visit was made to York to see one or two of his buildings. The President, Mr John Morrison, later announced to the Governing Body of the College that before meeting Mennim the Committee had not collectively felt enthusiasm for any of the college or university buildings which they had inspected and which had been designed by the architects they had interviewed. He went on to say that Mennim had been selected as architect by the Committee because it had been impressed by his taste and aesthetic judgment and its members believed they could work with him.

This was the start of a close working relationship between Mennim and the College of which its greatest fruit was the collection of buildings of pleasing symmetry, constructed in hand-made Stamford bricks with the Main Building in Weldon Stone, all arranged in courts on the Bredon House site between the years 1972–77. It became Wolfson College following the Wolfson benefaction in 1972.

There had been many false starts in the early years when Michael had been called upon to produce plans, perspectives and models, often at short notice which must have strained his patience and even during the construction period plans and lay-out had been altered and building affected due to high inflation, shortages of bricks because of the three-day week, and strikes. But through it all the relationship between the College and its architect and his partners remained steadfast. Michael himself wrote in an article for the College Magazine in 1977, "For a client to place trust in his architect, quantity surveyor and contractor must surely be unique but this what happened at Wolfson College, Cambridge."

== Historic buildings ==
Mennim's conservation work led to a close association with St Magnus Cathedral in Kirkwall, Orkney and he was responsible for much of its restoration even to the extent of re-opening its original quarry. Many other historic buildings in York, its County and throughout the country were restored by him. He became a lecturer in Conservation at the University of York and Consultant to the Landmark Trust on its growing collection of historic buildings and to other organisations with interests in such buildings. But he was first and foremost dedicated to his City of York, where he had undertaken many commissions and restorations (for some notable restorations such as Peaseholme House and Middlethorpe Hall he received architectural awards) and had been Master of the Company of Merchant Taylors of York and restored its ancient Hall (about which he published a History).

He designed Christ Church, York. He was a well-known figure in his village of Sutton-on-the-Forest where he created a fine two-acre garden behind his house. Besides many other village interests and activities, he had designed the new Vicarage, served as Chairman of the Parish Council and Churchwarden of the well-known All Hallows Church (where Laurence Sterne had been Priest) and where he had been married to his wife Eleanor, 53 years earlier. In retirement, Mennim published books about his time in India, the Company of Merchant Taylors of York and shortly before he died he was delighted to see the publication of his book on Tudor Hall Houses.

== Buildings designed ==
- Christ Church, York
- Wolfson College, Cambridge, of which he is now an Honorary Fellow

== Publications ==
- (1997). An Indian Odyssey. Croft Press.
- (2000). The Merchant Taylors Hall, York. Croft Press.
- (2002). Making Plans: An Architect’s Pilgrimage. Croft Press.
- (2005). Hall houses. York, England: William Sessions Ltd.
- p. 162 in Rawle, T. (1993). Cambridge Architecture. Trafalgar Square.
