= Fionn Laird =

Canadian actor

- Laird in 2025
- Born: Calgary, Alberta, Canada
- Occupation: Actor
- Years active: 2019–present
- Known for: The Institute, In a Violent Nature: Part 2, The Testaments

Fionn Laird is a Canadian actor and performer. He is best known for his role as Nick Wilholm in the 2025 MGM+ series The Institute, based on the Stephen King novel of the same name. He has also appeared in numerous Canadian Theatre productions. He is frequently associated with regional Canadian production companies and organizations, including Theatre Calgary, Arts Club Theatre Company, and Banff Centre for Arts and Creativity. He is based in Toronto, Ontario.

== Filmography ==
=== Film ===
Year	Title	Role	Notes	Ref.
2026	In A Violent Nature: Part 2	TBA		
TBA	Rocket Fuel	Julien		

=== Television ===
Year	Title	Role	Notes	Ref.
2022	Under the Banner of Heaven	Missionary #2	Episode: "Revelation"	
2025-2026	The Institute	Nick Wilholm		
2026	Murdoch Mysteries	Luka Wilde	Episode: "Devil in the Saddle"	
2026	The Testaments	Justin	Episode: "Daisy"	
2026	The Terminal List	James Reece (Young)	Episodes: “Shooter Ready”, “Fathers and Sons”	

== Theatrical credits ==
=== Regional theatre ===
Year	Show	Role	Company / Venue	Ref.
2019	Billy Elliot the Musical	Ensemble	Theatre Calgary	
2020	The Louder We Get	Otis Day	Theatre Calgary	
2023	Forgiveness	Cooper	Arts Club Theatre Company, Theatre Calgary	

=== Miscellaneous ===
Year	Event	Role	Company / Venue	Ref.
2024	Banff Centre Celebrates/Patti Lupone's Songs From A Hat	Featured Performer	Banff Centre for Arts and Creativity	
