= Astron-6 =

Canadian film producer

- Industry: Film
- Founded: 2007
- Defunct: 2020
- Headquarters: Canada
- Key people: Adam Brooks; Jeremy Gillespie; Matt Kennedy; Conor Sweeney; Steven Kostanski
- Website: www.astron-6.com

Astron-6 was a Canadian film production and directing company founded in 2007 by Adam Brooks and Jeremy Gillespie. The company later expanded to include Matt Kennedy, Conor Sweeney and Steven Kostanski, who are now equal partners in the company. Astron-6 is known for producing low-budget, 1980s-centric independent movies that often combine horror with comedy.

== Biography ==
A planned 2012 documentary No Sleep, No Surrender, which detailed the making and production of their 2011 film Father's Day, was never completed, though a teaser trailer was released. The follow-up to Father's Day, a Giallo-inspired horror comedy, The Editor, was directed by Adam Brooks and Matthew Kennedy in 2014.

In 2016, Astron-6 produced the web series Divorced Dad. The series was described by the filmmakers as 'a love letter to the endearingly incompetent cable access television shows created by far from screen-ready small town celebrities during the 1980s and 90s'.

Gillespie and Kostanski directed the 2016 horror film The Void, intended as a departure from Astron-6's more comedic work. The film showcases more of Kostanski's creature and practical effects as seen in Astron-6's earlier films.

== Filmography ==
- Astron-6 (2011, compilation DVD)
- Manborg (2011) (Steven Kostanski only)
- Father's Day (2011)
- The Editor (2014)
- "W is for Wish" in ABCs of Death 2 (2014)
- The Void (2016) (Steven Kostanski And Jeremy Gillespie only)
- Leprechaun Returns (2018) (Steven Kostanski only)
- Divorced Dad (2019) — 7-episode series
- Chowboys: An American Folktale (2019)
- Psycho Goreman (2020) (Steven Kostanski and Adam Brooks only)
- "Veggie Masher commercial" in "Storm Drain" segment for V/H/S/94 (2021) (Steven Kostanski and Conor Sweeney only)
- Frankie Freako (2024) (Steven Kostanski only)
- Deathstalker (2025) (Steven Kostanski only)
