= PG: Psycho Goreman =

2020 film by Steven Kostanski

- Promotional release poster
- Directed by: Steven Kostanski
- Written by: Steven Kostanski
- Produced by: Stuart F. Andrews; Shannon Hanmer; Steven Kostanski
- Starring: Nita-Josee Hanna; Owen Myre; Adam Brooks; Alexis Hancey; Matthew Ninaber; Kristen MacCulloch; Steven Vlahos; Reece Presley
- Cinematography: Andrew Appelle
- Edited by: Andrew Appelle; Steven Kostanski
- Music by: Blitz//Berlin
- Production company: Raven Banner Entertainment
- Distributed by: RLJE Films
- Release date: October 7, 2020 (Beyond Fest)
- Running time: 99 minutes
- Country: Canada
- Language: English
- Box office: $137,498

PG: Psycho Goreman, or simply Psycho Goreman, is a 2020 Canadian science fantasy action horror-comedy film written and directed by Steven Kostanski. It stars Nita-Josee Hanna and Owen Myre as a young sister and brother who unwittingly resurrect an ancient extraterrestrial overlord (voiced by Steven Vlahos and played by Matt Ninaber).

Psycho Goreman was originally scheduled to premiere at the South by Southwest film festival in March 2020, but the festival was cancelled due to the COVID-19 pandemic. It screened later that year as part of Beyond Fest, the Sitges Film Festival and Monster Fest. Having been acquired by RLJE Films and Shudder, Psycho Goreman was released in theaters and on video on demand on January 22, 2021.

== Plot ==
Siblings Mimi and Luke discover a strange, glowing gem while digging in their garden. That night, an alien monster emerges from the hole. The monster enters an old shoe factory and brutally kills a group of thieves hiding out there. The next day, Mimi and Luke follow a trail to the shoe factory and discover the monster, who identifies himself as "Arch-Duke of Nightmares", a deadly alien warrior imprisoned on earth after attempting to destroy the galaxy in a rampage. Before he can kill them, he realises Mimi has the gem, which allows her to command him. Mimi dubs the alien "Psycho Goreman" (or "PG" for short) and begins commanding PG around despite Luke's concerns. A group of aliens called the "Planetary Alliance" discover PG has escaped imprisonment, and send the warrior Pandora to Earth in the form of a human woman to kill him.

PG tells the children he was a slave to the Templars, Pandora's religious order on his home planet Gigax until he discovered the gem which bonded with him, giving immense power. He assembled an army called "The Paladins Obsidian" and battled the Templars, and began a rampage across the galaxy until the Planetary Alliance defeated him and imprisoned him on Earth. When the children leave, PG broadcasts a call for help to the Paladins Obsidian. Mimi and Luke's parents Susan and Greg see PG and Mimi introduces him to them, showing how she can control him. Mimi forces PG to accompany the family on activities, and he becomes a reluctant friend to the family.

While out with PG, the group is approached by two police officers who attack PG. PG mutates one of them into a deformed slave while the other officer escapes. Pandora arrives at the police station and interrogates the officer that escaped PG for information. In the woods, the Paladins Obsidian arrive in front of the group. PG orders them to kill Mimi and Luke, only for the Paladins to reveal they are now allied with the Templars. PG is injured by them when Mimi keeps him from fighting back until he apologises, but he kills them after being released. He then collapses from his injuries.

PG comes to Greg in a vision demanding he collects him and the children from the woods. Greg does so and they drive back to the house where Pandora is waiting with Susan. Susan suggests they hand over PG to Pandora, and Luke agrees. Greg sides with Mimi and drives away with PG, hiding in the shoe factory. Pandora reveals her true form before transforming Susan into an armored warrior to help take down PG. PG states giving him the gem is the only way to heal him, and Mimi agrees on the promise he will spare her and her family in his crusade against the galaxy, but realises Luke has stolen it.

Pandora, Susan, and Luke arrive and battle Mimi, Greg, and PG. Luke convinces Mimi that the power of the gem and PG have corrupted her. Before Pandora can kill PG, he challenges her to a battle of Mimi's choosing. She chooses Crazy Ball, a game she and Luke made up with extremely complex rules. Mimi's team wins but Pandora moves in to attack Mimi and PG anyway. Susan uses her powers to save Mimi but is reverted to her human form by Pandora. Luke and Mimi reconcile and hand the gem to PG, healing him. PG defeats Pandora and devours her. PG returns the now powerless gem to Mimi, stating that after witnessing the family's affection for each other, he is now powered by love. He will use that love to destroy the galaxy, but promises to spare the family. The family bids farewell to PG and watches as he begins to destroy their town. The news shows PG in giant form devastating the Earth, and in deep space the Planetary Alliance debates killing themselves before he can reach them.

== Cast ==
- Nita-Josee Hanna as Mimi
- Owen Myre as Luke
- Matthew Ninaber as Psycho Goreman (or "PG")
  - Steven Vlahos as the voice of Psycho Goreman
- Adam Brooks as Greg
- Alexis Hancey as Susan
- Kristen MacCulloch as Pandora
- Reece Presley as Chad (Thug 1)
- Rich Evans as Death Trapper
- Kenneth Welsh as Narrator/Judicator

== Release ==
Psycho Goreman was initially scheduled to premiere at the South by Southwest film festival in March 2020, prior to the festival's cancellation due to the COVID-19 pandemic. It screened later that year as part of Beyond Fest on October 7, 2020, and also screened as part of the Sitges Film Festival and Australia's Monster Fest. The film's distribution rights were acquired by RLJE Films and Shudder, and it was simultaneously released in theaters and on video on demand on January 22, 2021. A limited edition DVD/Blu-ray was released on March 16, 2021.

== Critical response ==
On the review aggregator website Rotten Tomatoes, the film holds an approval rating of 92% based on 83 reviews, with an average rating of 7.2/10. The site's consensus reads, "Over the top and enthusiastically strange, PG: Psycho Goreman delivers all the cheesy midnight-movie goodness promised by its title."

Barry Hertz of The Globe and Mail praised the film, writing that "if you happen to be operating on Kostanski's very particular and peculiar wavelength, the movie is an absolute riot. Working with few resources, the director creates a wildly colourful, surprisingly epic universe full of alien landscapes, energetic set-pieces and a fantastical creature design that strikes just the right balance between inventive and derivative." Owen Gleiberman, in his review of the film for Variety, concluded that "As satire, Psycho Goreman is no Planet Terror, but it's a droll enough schlock-in-quote-marks diversion, and part of its appeal is just how damn cheap it is. In the omni-tech era, it's fun to see a filmmaker build an FX fantasy out of scraps, from the ground up."

Bloody Disgusting's Meagan Navarro wrote that "We may not care about the human protagonists by the time the end credits roll and the '90s-style end credit rap kicks in, but [Psycho Goreman] does leave you hoping to see more of P.G. and his continued quest for domination of the cosmos." Richard Whittaker of The Austin Chronicle gave the film a score of three out of five stars, writing that it "channels Saturday mornings loaded with Power Rangers reruns, just with the added realization that the creatures were supercool." Chris Aitkens of Nightmare on Film Street praised the film, saying it was " a vehicle for over-the-top violence". Mary Beth McAndrews of Paste called the film "a necessary explosion of ridiculous fun in a time when it's needed most. [...] The extreme tonal shifts from hard sci-fi to family comedy will be weird for some, but Kostanski never hides what this film is: Ridiculous."

Conversely, Simon Abrams of RogerEbert.com gave the film one-and-a-half stars out of four, writing that it "isn't clever or lively enough to be more than fitfully fun, especially given how much time is spent mocking generic, but painstakingly recreated plot contrivances." Slant Magazine's Pat Brown gave it two out of four stars, calling it a "tongue-in-cheek gorefest" but also "a somewhat empty film."

Chainsaw Man author Tatsuki Fujimoto called the film "The most interesting movie I've seen this year!" in 2021 and made fan art for it. In 2023, Barry Hertz of The Globe and Mail named the film as one of the 23 best Canadian comedy films ever made.
