= Blue Moon Rising (novel) =

1991 fantasy novel by Simon R. Green

- Cover art for the original edition
- Author: Simon R Green
- Language: English
- Series: The Forest Kingdom
- Genre: Fantasy
- Publisher: UK: Gollancz; United States: Penguin/Roc
- Publication date: 1991 (1st edition)
- Publication place: United States: May 1991; UK: September 1991
- Media type: Print (Paperback/Hardback)
- Pages: 448
- ISBN: 1-85798-987-2
- OCLC: 44184634
- Followed by: Blood & Honour

Blue Moon Rising is a fantasy novel by British author, Simon R. Green. The first in a series of four books in the Forest Kingdom series with the main protagonists appearing in six books in the Hawk & Fisher series by Green.

The book had a troubled launch with many publishers rejecting Green before being published by Roc. The book became Green's first bestseller.

As with other Green books, it is written in a style which combines dramatic storytelling with plenty of wry humour and light relief.

== Plot introduction ==
The novel is a quest story, primarily concerned with Rupert, prince of the Forest Kingdom and second in line to the throne who makes an arduous journey to prove his worth, do his duty and eventually save the Kingdom from the spread of the evil Darkwood.

== Plot summary ==
Rupert's quest is to slay a dragon, proving his worth to the kingdom; however Rupert knows he has been sent to die. He stubbornly refuses to run away and proceeds with the undertaking. Rupert seeks out the notorious Night Witch who, upon finding out he is the grandson of her long dead lover provides him with a map to find a dragon. To get to his destination Rupert must pass through the Darkwood, an area in the forest where no light ever penetrates, where nothing lives except demons. Passing through the endless night Rupert is attacked by countless demons which appear to be hunting in packs though demons have never hunted in packs before.

After reaching the other side of the Darkwood Rupert discovers a dragon in a cave at the top of a mountain and upon challenging him is surprised to find that not only does the dragon not have any interest in killing him, it collects butterflies. Also in the cave is Princess Julia, a seventh daughter from the Hillsdown province who was sent to the dragon as a sacrifice but which the dragon does "not have the heart" to kill.

Rupert, his Unicorn, Princess Julia and the Dragon set out back towards the Forest Castle but have to pass through the Darkwood again. Rupert can hardly bring himself to face the endless night of that experience again but knowing he must, they press on. Near the completion of this second passing of the Darkwood the group are attacked by hordes of demons. The dragon offers some of the last of his strength to enable Rupert to obtain the Rainbow Sword which banishes the darkness from them and heals their wounds.

The group are able to make it back to Forest Castle only to find that the Darkwood is spreading and the castle guard has been vastly depleted in defending the outlying towns and villages from the encroaching Darkwood. Rupert is sent back out with a company of guards to travel through the Darkwood again in search of the High Warlock.

== Characters ==
Prince Rupert

Prince Rupert is an unwanted second heir to the throne of the Forest Kingdom, behind his elder brother Harold. He was sent to "face a dragon" as a way of averting a possible civil war from having two healthy adult claimants to the throne.

Princess Julia

Princess Julia is seventh in line to the Hillsdown Duchy. She was sent to the cave of a dragon as a sacrifice after she refused to enter an arranged marriage and attempted to run away.

Breeze

Breeze is Prince Rupert's Unicorn who over the course of the story becomes a faithful and true companion to Rupert. He goes with him on the dragon quest and faces the demons with him. In the end, he is set free by Rupert but chooses to stay with him of his own free will.

Prince Harold

The first born son of King John. Prince Harold is considered to be the perfect prince: charming, intelligent, and ruthless when he needs to be. Harold has been groomed from birth to be a king. Because of this, Harold and his younger brother Rupert have never been close. To the point of open hostilities.

King John

King of the Forest land, father to princes Harold and Rupert.

The High Warlock

The High Warlock was and is the most powerful sorcerer in Forest Kingdom history. He was adviser to seven generations of Forest King, but was banished from the kingdom by King John for failing to save Queen Elinor. The High Warlock proceeded to drink himself into oblivion and bury himself in study of magic theory, until Prince Rupert came to the Dark Tower for his aid.

The Champion

Kings Champion and general of the Forest Kingdom.

The Demon Prince

The Demon Prince is one of the Transient Beings. Abstract concepts made flesh, thoughts and ideals, dreams and beliefs given form and substance in the world of men. The Demon Prince is the personification of corruption and darkness. He – or more appropriately: it – created the Darkwood thousands of years ago, darkness made manifest in the world. It seeks to destroy the Forest Kingdom and the world by reforming it all into the Darkwood and the Long Night.

== Reception ==
Reviews have generally been positive although limited due to the relative obscurity of the book.

Rave Reviews, the New York Daily News, and Science Fiction Chronicle reviewed the novel favourably.

== Release ==
Blue Moon Rising was released in the US and UK in the same year through the publishers Penguin/Roc (USA) and Gollancz (UK).

- 1991, United States, Penguin/Roc ISBN 1-85798-987-2, Pub date: May 1991, Paperback

First edition

- 1991, UK, Gollancz ISBN 1-85798-987-2, Pub date: September 1991, Paperback

First edition
