= Deathstalker (novel) =

1995 novel by Simon R. Green

- Cover of the 1995 first edition UK paperback release of Deathstalker
- Author: Simon R. Green
- Cover artist: UK: Harvey Parker; US: Donato Giancola
- Language: English
- Series: Deathstalker
- Genre: Science fiction
- Publisher: UK: Gollancz; US: Penguin/Roc
- Publication date: 1995 (1st edition)
- Publication place: UK/US simultaneous release
- Media type: Print (paperback)
- Pages: UK: 571; US: 523
- ISBN: 0-575-05730-0 (UK); ISBN 0-451-45435-9 (US)
- OCLC: 32131460
- Preceded by: Deathstalker Prelude
- Followed by: Deathstalker Rebellion

Deathstalker is a science fiction novel by British author Simon R. Green. The second in a series of nine novels, Deathstalker is part homage to – and part parody/satire of – the classic space operas of the 1950s, and deals with the timeless themes of honour, love, courage and betrayal.

== Plot introduction ==
Set in a far-future fictional universe, Deathstalker follows the life of Owen Deathstalker, a minor aristocrat and historian, as he is catapulted from a life of quiet luxury and academic pursuit into a galaxy-wide rebellion against the empire in which he lives.
