= Father's Day (2011 film) =

- Theatrical release poster
- Directed by: Adam Brooks Jeremy Gillespie Matthew Kennedy Steven Kostanski Conor Sweeney
- Written by: Adam Brooks; Jeremy Gillespie; Matthew Kennedy; Steven Kostanski; Conor Sweeney
- Produced by: Michael Herz; Lloyd Kaufman
- Starring: Adam Brooks; Matthew Kennedy; Conor Sweeney; Amy Groening; Mackenzie Murdock; Meredith Sweeney
- Cinematography: Adam Brooks; Jeremy Gillespie; Matthew Kennedy; Steven Kostanski; Conor Sweeney
- Edited by: Adam Brooks
- Music by: Jeremy Gillespie; Paul Joyce
- Production company: Astron-6
- Distributed by: Troma Entertainment
- Release date: October 21, 2011 (Toronto After Dark Film Festival)
- Running time: 99 minutes
- Countries: United States; Canada
- Language: English
- Budget: $10,000

Father's Day is a 2011 action-horror comedy film directed by Adam Brooks, Jeremy Gillespie, Matthew Kennedy, Steven Kostanski and Conor Sweeney (collectively known as Astron-6). The film stars Brooks as Ahab, a man determined to exact revenge on Chris Fuchman, the Father's Day Killer, a rapist and serial killer who murdered his father years ago.

Originally made as a short film, the feature-length version had its world premiere on October 21, 2011, at the Toronto After Dark Film Festival, where it received multiple awards. A documentary detailing the film's production process entitled No Sleep, No Surrender was teased in 2012 (although it has yet to be officially released).

Despite being produced and distributed by Troma Entertainment, it bears no relation to Mother's Day or its 2010 remake.

== Plot ==
Thirty years ago, serial killer Chris Fuchman (Mackenzie Murdock) raped and murdered 10 fathers but was released on a technicality. During the next 10 years, more father rapes and murders were committed, but no evidence was found to be the work of Fuchman. One of the victims was the father of siblings Ahab and Chelsea. The siblings are separated and Ahab is sent to stay with local priest Father O'Flynn (Kevin Anderson). Ahab (Adam Brooks) tracks Fuchman down at the scene of his latest crime, the murder of another father named Bill Cummings. Ahab is caught and arrested by Detective Stegel (Brent Neale) and is tried for Fuchman's murders. Ahab is cleared for all the murders except Cummings's murder and is sentenced to 10 years in prison.

Father O'Flynn tells John he must find Ahab and bring him to talk to him. John finds Ahab living by himself in a hut. Ahab initially refuses to talk to O'Flynn, but eventually obliges so he can reunite with Chelsea, taking some poisonous syrup he had made. They go back to the church and Ahab talks to Father O'Flynn, who suggests that Ahab search Andrew's house for clues. Ahab searches the house, but encounters Stegel, who tells him that Chelsea (Amy Groening) works at a strip club called the Lowlife. Ahab goes to the club and meets the manager, Sleazy Mary (Meredith Sweeney), an old flame from his past.

Chelsea invites her friends Andrew (also known as Twink) and Walnut over to her apartment, where the lights go out and Walnut is killed by Fuchman after he reveals he may have accidentally gotten a girl pregnant. Twink is almost killed as well but Chelsea shoots Fuchman, scaring him off. Fuchman escapes as Ahab arrives to talk to Chelsea again. Ahab and Twink meet for the first time and band together to kill Fuchman when Stegel knocks at the door to question Chelsea. Chelsea agrees to help Ahab and Twink escape from Stegel on the condition that they meet her at the Lowlife so she can join them to take Fuchman down. They agree and Chelsea helps them escape, but Ahab tells Twink that they have to keep Chelsea out of it.

That night, Father O'Flynn is killed by Fuchman, and John joins Ahab and Twink on their mission. The three locate Fuchman using Chelsea's notebook on Fuchman and Ahab kills him after finding Chelsea badly injured.

Later, John goes to clean out Father O'Flynn's room, where he discovers an ancient tome of Father O'Flynn's, which leads him to discover that Chris Fuchman is a manifestation of a demon known as the Fuchmanicus, who is worshiped by a cult of Satanists. There is a Fuchman each generation, for the sole purpose of raping, killing and eating the souls of fathers, and when one dies, the Fuchmanicus possesses the body of a woman in order to reproduce another. The book tells the prophecy of a man, resembling Ahab, creating "the most powerful Fuchman ever". Meanwhile, Chelsea (possessed by Fuchman) arrives at Ahab's room and seduces him, and the siblings proceed to have multiple sexual encounters, culminating in the implied creation of a Fuchman born of incest.

The Satanist cult, which Stegel and Mark are revealed to be members of, attacks Ahab at his apartment. Luckily, John and Twink arrive just in time to help Ahab fight the cult off and kill them, berating Ahab for allowing himself to be seduced by his own sister. They discover that Fuchman has taken Chelsea back to Hell with him. Ahab, John and Twink kill themselves to travel to Hell and save Chelsea. John is sent to Heaven, where he takes an angel hostage and then proceeds to hold up God in order to gain access to Hell, and Twink is killed by a demon who uses Walnut (and their unconsummated love) as bait and decapitates him. Ahab finds the Fuchmanicus' lair, where it has Chelsea chained to him while Stegel and Mark serve as guards. Mark and Stegel are crushed to death, but John is split in half. Mary appears and throws Ahab's jar of syrup at the Fuchmanicus. Fuchman turns into a baby and is stomped to death by Chelsea.

Mary attempts to romantically reconcile with Ahab, but is rejected in favor for Chelsea (much to Mary's disgust). Chelsea declares her love for her brother, who vows never to leave her again, but the pair are separated when Chelsea's soul returns to Earth. The devil is revealed to be God, and as she fades away, John begs Chelsea to have an abortion in order to kill the potential Fuchman/product of incest growing in her womb.

Mary, Ahab and John are left in Hell and question how they will escape. John suggests they just hope; however, as the camera pans to their bodies on Earth, it is revealed that the corpses of Twink, Ahab and John have rotted away and have been eaten by a pair of cats, rendering Chelsea the only survivor and leaving the trio's escape uncertain.

== Cast ==
- Adam Brooks as Ahab
- Matthew Kennedy as Father John Sullivan
- Conor Sweeney as Andrew "Twink"
- Amy Groening as Chelsea
- Mackenzie Murdock as Chris Fuchman
- Meredith Sweeney as Sleazy Mary
- Brent Neale as Detective Stegel
- Garrett Hnatiuk as Walnut
- Kevin Anderson as Father O'Flynn
- Billy Sadoo as Twink's Dad
- Falcon Van Der Baek as Heaven Guide
- Zsuzsi as The Chainsaw Ripper / Angel
- Lloyd Kaufman as God / Devil
- Murray Davidson as Artie
- Kyle Young as Mark

== Release ==
=== Censorship ===
While it passed uncut with an 18 certificate in the United Kingdom by the British Board of Film Classification, Father's Day was banned in its uncut form and in a censored form in Australia by the Australian Classification Board before a second censored version was eventually passed with an R18+ rating.

=== Critical reception ===
Critical reception for Father's Day has been predominantly positive and Ain't It Cool News reviewed the film favorably. Film School Rejects gave Father's Day a positive review and stated that "This is what Grindhouse films should aspire to be." CBC Manitoba remarked that the movie would not be for all viewers, but would have a large appeal for gorehounds. Horror observer Tony Vilgotsky wrote that he liked the movie, though he would have preferred it to be more frightening than comedic.

=== Accolades ===
- Audience Award: Best Feature Film at the Toronto After Dark Film Festival (2011, won)
- Fan's Choice Award: Best Hero at the Toronto After Dark Film Festival (2011, won)
- Fan's Choice Award: Most Original Film at the Toronto After Dark Film Festival (2011, won)
- Fan's Choice Award: Best Kills at the Toronto After Dark Film Festival (2011, won)
- Fan's Choice Award: Best Trailer at the Toronto After Dark Film Festival (2011, won)
- Best Film at A Night of Horror Film Festival (2011, won)
- Best Director at A Night of Horror Film Festival (2011, won)
- Best Actor - Adam Brooks at A Night of Horror Film Festival (2011, won)
