= Fatal Visions =

Fatal Visions was a cult film magazine from Melbourne, Australia, that ran from 1988 to 1998, and was edited by journalist Michael Helms. The magazine was published two or three times a year, and featured various reviews and interviews, but focused chiefly on covering horror, action and exploitation movies. Due to its proximity to the Chinatown Cinema theatres in Melbourne it featured - from its early issues onwards - reviews and articles about Hong Kong action and exploitation films some years before these were well-covered by other magazines in the west. Editor Michael Helms continues to write freelance articles for magazines such as Fangoria but was discussed the idea of bringing the magazine back to print in some form online. In 2013 the magazine became an online publication.
