= Deathstalker (2025 film) =

- Theatrical release poster
- Directed by: Steven Kostanski
- Written by: Steven Kostanski
- Produced by: Pasha Patriki; Michael Paszt; Avi Federgreen; James Fler; Andrew Thomas Hunt
- Starring: Daniel Bernhardt; Patton Oswalt; Christina Orjalo; Paul Lazenby; Nina Bergman
- Cinematography: Andrew Appelle
- Edited by: Robert Hyland
- Music by: Blitz//Berlin
- Production companies: Hangar 18 Media; Berserkergang Films
- Distributed by: Raven Banner Entertainment (Canada); Shout! Studios (United States)
- Release dates: August 15, 2025 (Locarno); October 10, 2025 (United States)
- Running time: 103 minutes
- Countries: Canada; United States
- Language: English

Deathstalker is a 2025 sword and sorcery film written and directed by Steven Kostanski. It is a remake of the 1983 film of the same name and the sixth installment in the Deathstalker film series. It stars Daniel Bernhardt as the titular character, alongside Patton Oswalt, Christina Orjalo, Paul Lazenby, and Nina Bergman.

The film premiered at the 78th Locarno Film Festival on August 15, 2025, and was released in the United States by Shout! Studios on October 10, 2025.

== Plot ==
Deathstalker, a former knight, picks through the dead and dying on a battlefield. He steals jewellery and a golden amulet from a dying man. At a nearby village, while Deathstalker is eating in a tavern, a two-headed troll attacks him in search of the amulet. Deathstalker kills the troll, and having decided the amulet is more trouble than it is worth, throws it into a river. However, the amulet reappears in his pocket. After several attempts to get rid of the amulet fails, Deathstalker visits the witch Toralva.

While unable to read the language on the amulet, Toralva tells Deathstalker that it is bound to him until he dies, and that he must search for a wizard who can understand the writing on the amulet. Toralva further warns him that a great evil is rising, but Deathstalker does not believe her.

Following Toralva's directions, Deathstalker enters a cave system in search of the wizard. He is then attacked by man-eating serpents but manages to escape with a chest in which Daedelad the wizard (who everybody calls Doodad) has been imprisoned. Releasing Doodad, he recruits him to help. Doodad is also unable to read the amulet but agrees to help him raid the crypt of a dead wizard for a scroll that will help him translate it.

On the way there, Deathstalker and Doodad learn that an ancient necromancer, Necromemnon, has returned and is after the amulet. They are attacked by evil dreadites, who serve Necromemnon, and their commander is revealed to be Deathstalker's old friend Jotak, whom he thought had died. Deathstalker cuts off Jotak's arm and flees.

However, when they reach the crypt they discover Necronemnon's minions have beaten them to it. While sneaking in disguised as dead bodies, they encounter the thief Brisbayne, who teams up with them. After escaping with the scroll they need, they make camp in the Moaning Woods.

After being attacked by a stone titan and then a blade wielding mummy, Deathstalker is injured, and they are forced to stop to rest. Doodad is able to break the amulet's bond to Deathstalker during the night, and reads to them a prophecy from the amulet, which describes a magical sword that can defeat Necronemnon.

While asleep, Deathstalker and Doodad are betrayed by Brisbayne and taken prisoner by the thief queen, Grendul, who intends to sell the amulet back to the prince. While interrogating them, Grendul accidentally awakens swamp monsters, who attack her people. Doodad is able to befriend the swamp monsters with music, allowing Deathstalker to escape.

Deathstalker takes Grendul's place at the meeting with Prince Baldur and agrees to sell him the amulet. After Baldur double crosses him, the Dreadites attack, slaying the prince's knights. While fleeing, Jotak ambushes Deathstalker, his arm now replaced with a monstrous one. Brisbayne returns to help, but Jotak prevails, and kills both Deathstalker and the prince, taking the amulet.

The swamp monsters heal Deathstalker, and he attacks Necronemnon's fortress to rescue his friends. After freeing Doodad, the two duel Necronemnon and Jotak. A rock fall, caused by Doodad, injures Necronemnon, but not before Brisbayne is transformed into a vessel of the demon Citor.

At the last moment Deathstalker is able to retrieve the prophesied sword, and with it, he destroys Citor and resurrects Brisbayne, finally defeating the Dreadites. Afterwards, Deathstalker decides to destroy the prophesied sword, believing it too powerful to be wielded by man, but Doodad struggles to achieve this with his bad aim.

== Cast ==
- Daniel Bernhardt as Deathstalker
- Laurie Field as Doodad (Daedelad)
- Patton Oswalt as Doodad (voice)
- Christina Orjalo as Brisbayne
- Paul Lazenby as Jotak
- Nina Bergman as Grendel

== Production ==
In March 2024, it was revealed that a new Deathstalker film was in development, with Steven Kostanski writing and directing the film. Daniel Bernhardt was cast as the titular character, and Slash serving as an executive producer. In the subsequent months, it was revealed that Christina Orjalo, Paul Lazenby, and Nina Bergman joined the cast.

=== Filming ===
Principal photography began in late April 2024, in Greater Sudbury, Canada, and wrapped on October 12.

== Music ==
Blitz//Berlin composed the score, while Slash, Bear McCreary, and Chuck Cirino composed the theme song for the film. Co-star Nina Bergman co-wrote and performed the film's end credit song "Walking Alone"

== Release ==
Deathstalker premiered at the 78th Locarno Film Festival on August 15, 2025, and was released in the United States by Shout! Studios on October 10, 2025.

== Reception ==
On the review aggregator website Rotten Tomatoes, 90% of 40 critics' reviews are positive, with an average rating of 7.2/10. The website's consensus reads: "A gleefully gory and deliberately silly reimagining, Deathstalker thrives on inventive creature effects and tongue-in-cheek performances, making it a chaotic but charming addition to the sword and sorcery genre."

Catherine Bray of The Guardian described the film as a "loving remake" with "sensational low-budget creature design" and "lashings of goopy practical special effects".
