= Laurie Babin =

Canadian actress

- Occupation: Actress
- Years active: 2011–present
- Notable work: Red Rooms

Laurie Babin is a Canadian actress from Quebec. She is most noted for her performance in the film Red Rooms (Les Chambres rouges), for which she won the Prix Iris for Best Supporting Actress at the 25th Quebec Cinema Awards in 2023.

Her other roles have included the films The Passion of Augustine (La Passion d'Augustine), The Little Girl Who Was Too Fond of Matches (La petite fille qui aimait trop les allumettes) and Before We Explode (Avant qu'on explose), and the television series The Night Logan Woke Up (La nuit où Laurier Gaudreault s'est réveillé).

== Filmography ==
=== Film ===
Year	Title	Role	Notes
2015	The Passion of Augustine	Young Simone	
2016	L'hiver le plus froid	Unknown	Short film
2016	Just a Feeling	Her	Short film
2017	The Little Girl Who Was Too Fond of Matches	The just punishment	
2017	Solitude	Girl	Short film
2019	Before We Explode	Nathalie	
2019	Qui part à la chasse	Emma-Rose	Short film
2020	All About Girls	Ariane	Short film
2023	Papa Guillotine	Anna	Short film
2023	Red Rooms	Clementine	
2024	Foyers	The Woman	Voice role
2025	Anna Kiri	Lucy	

=== Television ===
Year	Title	Role	Notes
2011	30 vies	Catherine Desrochers	1 episode
2012–2014	En thérapie	Noémie	
2018	Victor Lessard	Myriam Cummings	9 episodes
2019–2022	Le 422	Dju	Main cast (18 episodes)
2020	La vie compliquée de Léa Olivier	Sarah	10 episodes
2020	Où est Lucie?	Unknown	TV miniseries (1 episode)
2020	Toute la vie	Unknown	1 episode
2020	Mon fils	Noémie Craig	TV miniseires (2 episodes)
2022	Toute la vie	Unknown	2 episodes
2022	Lac-Noir	Jade	TV miniseries (8 episodes)
2022	The Night Logan Woke Up	Marie Saint-Jean	Episode: "La nuit où Mireille était reparue"
2024	La Terre appelle Mathilde	Laurie-Anne	
