= Manborg =

- Manborg film poster
- Directed by: Steven Kostanski
- Written by: Steven Kostanski; Jeremy Gillespie
- Produced by: Steven Kostanski
- Starring: Matthew Kennedy; Adam Brooks; Meredith Sweeney; Conor Sweeney; Ludwig Lee
- Edited by: Steven Kostanski
- Music by: Brian Wiacek
- Production company: Astron-6
- Distributed by: Raven Banner Entertainment
- Release date: 22 September 2011 (Fantastic Fest)
- Running time: 70 minutes
- Country: Canada
- Language: English
- Budget: approximately $1,000 (CA$)

Manborg is a 2011 Canadian science-fiction action film, directed by Steven Kostanski, and released by Astron-6.

== Plot ==
Count Draculon (Adam Brooks) and his Nazi vampire forces seek to take over Earth during the Hell Wars. A soldier (Matthew Kennedy) is killed attempting to fight the Count, then transformed into Manborg after his body is fitted with robotics. After Manborg becomes active in Mega-Death City, he meets with resistance fighters against Count Draculon. Justice (Conor Sweeney) is a gunfighter who resembles Billy Idol with an "Australian" accent who is joined by his sister Mina (Meredith Sweeney) and martial arts expert #1 Man (Ludwig Lee, voice-dubbed by Kyle Hebert).

== Cast ==
- Matthew Kennedy as Manborg
- Adam Brooks as Count Draculon and Dr. Scorpious
- Meredith Sweeney as Mina
- Conor Sweeney as Justice
- Ludwig Lee as #1 Man (voice dubbed by Kyle Hebert)
- Jeremy Gillespie as The Baron
- Andrea Karr as Shadow Mega
- Mike Kostanski as Little Guy

== Production ==
Production began in 2009 (with most of it shot in the garage of the director Steven Kostanski), with approximately one year of filming followed by two years of post-production. Chroma key backdrops were used for most filmed scenes. Production costs were approximately $1,000 (CAD).

In an interview with Monsterpictures.com Steve Kostanski said a lot of the movie was shot in his parents' garage. The costumes for the film were made of garbage and oftentimes he would glue them back together during production. Most of the set pieces were built with scraps the team found in dumpsters. Steve was also quoted saying a lot of their props are "cannibalized" and reused in other scenes.

== Release ==
The first public screening of Manborg was on 22 September 2011 at Fantastic Fest in Austin, Texas. It was then released on DVD on 11 Feb 2013.

The movie also appears in the 2026 videogame High on Life 2.

== Reception ==
Rick Groen of The Globe and Mail took a favorable view of Manborg, declaring it "cheap and cheesy, no doubt, but with some real tang and, occasionally, a strong bite". The Toronto Star's Peter Howell deemed the film "a marvel of DIY makeup, costuming and special effects" although he believed the production "would have been a much better movie without the cheese".
