= The Editor =

- Directed by: Adam Brooks; Matthew Kennedy
- Written by: Adam Brooks; Matthew Kennedy; Conor Sweeney
- Produced by: Adam Brooks; Matthew Kennedy
- Starring: Paz de la Huerta; Adam Brooks; Laurence R. Harvey; Udo Kier
- Cinematography: Adam Brooks; Matthew Kennedy
- Edited by: Adam Brooks (as Rey Cisco)
- Music by: Jeremy Gillespie; Carpenter Brut; Norman Orenstein; Claudio Simonetti
- Production companies: Astron-6; XYZ Films; Telefilm Canada
- Distributed by: Scream Factory
- Release dates: September 11, 2014 (TIFF); September 8, 2015 (Canada)
- Running time: 95 minutes
- Country: Canada
- Language: English
- Budget: approximately $130,000 (CA$)

The Editor is a 2014 Canadian giallo-horror film by Astron-6 and starring Paz de la Huerta, Adam Brooks, Laurence R. Harvey, and Udo Kier. The film is an homage to and parody of giallo, a cinematic and literary subgenre originating in Italy and popularized through films like The Bird with the Crystal Plumage, Torso, Deep Red, and A Lizard in a Woman's Skin.

The film was shot on-location in Winnipeg, Manitoba and Kenora, Ontario, and premiered at the 2014 Toronto International Film Festival. It was released on home video and VOD platforms on September 8, 2015, and received mixed-to-positive reviews.

== Plot ==
Film editor Rey Ciso, once a promising talent, now handicapped by a wooden prosthetic hand following a tragic accident, works on director Francesco Mancini's latest *giallo/poliziotteschi* film *Tarantola* alongside his assistant Bella. After hours, a mysterious killer infiltrates the studio, murdering lead actor Claudio Calvetti and his girlfriend Veronica, who is later discovered by actress Margarit Porfiry, resulting in Margarit's hysterical blindness. Police Inspector Peter Porfiry investigates, suspecting Rey due to the manner in which the victims' fingers were severed—mirroring Rey's own injury.

As the investigation unfolds, Mancini replaces Claudio with a stand-in, Cesare, who is also murdered in a similar fashion. Rey recounts his troubled past, including his asylum stay following his self-inflicted injury during intense pressure editing for famed art house director Umberto Fantori. Meanwhile, Rey uncovers footage that appears to document the murders. Amid supernatural visions and escalating killings, including those of Rey's assistant Bella and other cast members, the film’s production is plagued by horror and sabotage.

The climax reveals Josephine Jardin, Rey's estranged wife and Fantori’s muse, as the true killer who embodies Death itself. A final confrontation ensues, ending with Josephine’s demise and Porfiry’s revelation that the murders were motivated by ambition and vengeance within the film’s production. The narrative closes ambiguously, blurring reality and illusion as Porfiry discovers he may be trapped within the editing process itself.

== Cast ==
- Adam Brooks as Rey Ciso
- Matthew Kennedy as Inspector Peter Porfiry
- Paz de la Huerta as Josephine Jardin
- Conor Sweeney as Cal Konitz
- Samantha Hill as Bella
- Udo Kier as Dr. Alberto Casini
- Laurence R. Harvey as Father Clarke
- Kevin Anderson as Francesco Mancini
- Sheila Campbell as Margarit Porfiry
- Jerry Wasserman as Police Chief O'Connor
- Dan Bern as Umberto Fantori
- Brent Neale as Giancarlo
- Jasmine Mae as Jasmine Rain
- Brett Donahue as Claudio Berti
- Tristan Risk as Veronica
- Lance Cartwright as Cesare
- William O'Donnell as Giuseppe

== Reception ==
The Editor has a 58% approval rating on Rotten Tomatoes, based on 12 reviews. Mark L. Miller of Ain't It Cool News ranked it the 25th best horror film released between October 1 of 2014 and 2015, deeming it Astron-6's "most successful and entertaining film to date".
