= Peter Mennim =

British artist, based in Cambridge (born 1955)

Peter Mennim (born 1955) is a British artist, based in Cambridge. He grew up in York, and was educated at Worksop College and Reading University.

His commissions include a large group portrait for the 40th anniversary of Wolfson College, Cambridge (his father Michael Mennim having been the architect of its first buildings) and Group Portrait of the Company of Merchant Adventurers of the City of York held at the Merchant Adventurers' Hall, York and a portrait of Duncan Robinson, commissioned when master of Magdalene College, Cambridge.

During the 1980s and early 1990s he worked as an illustrator and produced many film posters and book covers including the book jacket The Hitchhiker's Guide to the Galaxy by Douglas Adams., the record cover art for the Rum Sodomy & the Lash by The Pogues, the movie posters The Crow (1994 film) and Highlander II: The Quickening.
