= Simon R. Green =

British speculative fiction author (born 1955)

- Born: 25 August 1955 (age 71); Bradford on Avon, Wiltshire, England
- Education: University of Leicester (M.A., Modern English & American Literature)
- Occupation: Novelist
- Writing career
- Genres: Science fiction, Fantasy, urban fantasy

Simon Richard Green (born 25 August 1955) is an English science fiction and fantasy author.

Green was born in Bradford on Avon, Wiltshire, England. He holds a degree in modern English and American literature from the University of Leicester. He began writing in 1973, sold his first story "Manslayer" in 1976, and published his first full-length work, Awake, Awake, Ye Northern Winds in 1979. In 1988 he sold seven novels, and in 1989, he received a commission to write the novelization of the Kevin Costner film Robin Hood: Prince of Thieves, which has sold more than 370,000 copies. In the 1990s, Green was publishing regularly through Victor Gollancz Ltd.

Green's novels have been described as fantasy set in contemporary urban settings "that are slightly off", as well as a "writer of both space opera and heroic fantasy."

== Early life ==
According to an interview with Green, his first introduction to speculative fiction came as a result of the fact that his father was a fan of Edgar Rice Burroughs' Tarzan and John Carter novels. He also mentions in another interview that he would go to the cinema as a child and the films he watched there, such as 55 Days at Peking, and a film adaptation of H.G. Wells' The First Men in the Moon played a significant influence on his work. He also mentions in the same interview that, as a child, he had a nightmare featuring a stuffed fox head on his parents' wall, which had become sentient and was snarling at him. Doctor Who also formed an influence on the young Green.

== Critical reception ==
Green's works have received comparatively little attention compared to more successful British fantasy authors, with his Deathstalker series receiving mixed reviews overall. What little reception has been given to his work has remained positive, with much emphasis placed on its value as entertainment. In a review of Green's novel Live and Let Drood, Michael M Jones stated the following: "I've long held that Green's books make for excellent popcorn reading. They're widescreen adventures, blockbusters with unlimited budgets and absolutely no restraint or sense of decorum. The body counts are high, the stakes higher, the sense of wonder undeniable." In her review of The Best Thing You Can Steal, Elizabeth Tabler considered the novel "pure fun", despite the overall flaws of its heist narrative. Green's Nightside novels were referenced by Stefan Ekman in chapter four of his book Urban Fantasy: Exploring Modernity Through Magic. The Nightside novels were reviewed by Jasper de Joode, who described them as "pretty cool, providing lively and eerie action... for everyone who likes urban fantasy, this is a winning series".

== Adaptations ==
Green's novels have been adapted into dramatised audiobooks by companies such as GraphicAudio. The company began with his Deathstalker series, starting with Deathstalker: Honour on the first of January 2006. The film Judas Ghost is also based upon his Ghost Finders novels and is the only film adaptation thus far of any of Green's works.

== See also ==
- Simon R. Green bibliography
