= Goggles =

Forms of protective eyewear that do not enclose the nose

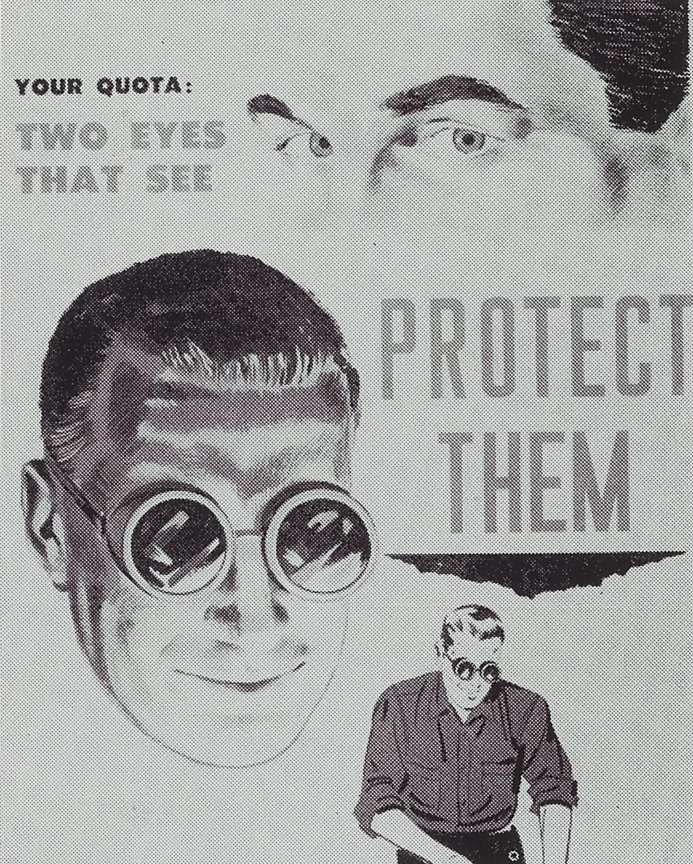
Laboratory safety advisory about the importance of protective goggles, 1955

Goggles, or safety glasses, are forms of protective eyewear that usually enclose or protect the area surrounding the eye in order to prevent particulates, water or chemicals from striking the eyes. They are used in chemistry laboratories and in woodworking. They are often used in snow sports as well, and in the sport of swimming. Goggles are often worn when using power tools such as drills or chainsaws to prevent flying particles from damaging the eyes. Many types of goggles are available as prescription goggles for those with vision problems.

== History ==
The Inuit and Yupik carved snow goggles from the antlers of caribou, wood, and shell to help prevent snow blindness. The goggles were curved to fit the user's face and had a large groove cut in the back to allow for the nose. A long thin slit was cut through the goggles to allow in a small amount of light, diminishing subsequent ultraviolet rays. The goggles were held to the head by a cord made of caribou sinew.

In the early 20th century, goggles were worn by drivers of uncovered cars to prevent irritation of the eyes by dust or wind. Likewise in the first ten years after the invention of the airplane in 1903 goggles became a necessity as wind blow became more severe as aircraft speeds increased and as protection against bugstrikes at high altitudes. The first pilot to wear goggles was probably Charles Manly in his failed attempt to fly Samuel Langley's aerodrome in 1903.

In 1875, Matthew Webb attempted to use a form of goggles without a seal (which he called "barnacles") on his first attempt at swimming across the English Channel, the intent was to shield his eyes from the splashing of the salt water.

== Types ==
The requirements for goggles varies depending on the use. Some examples:

- Cold weather: Most modern cold-weather goggles have two layers of lens to prevent the interior from becoming "foggy". With only a single lens, the interior water vapor condenses onto the lens because the lens is colder than the vapor, although anti-fog agents can be used. The reasoning behind the dual layer lens is that the inner lens will be warm while the outer lens will be cold. As long as the temperature of the inner lens is close to that of the interior water vapor, the vapor should not condense. However, if water vapor gets between the layers of the lens, condensation can occur between the lenses and is almost impossible to get rid of; thus, properly constructed and maintained dual layer lenses should be airtight to prevent water vapor from entering between the lenses.
- Swimming: Must be watertight to prevent water, such as salt water when swimming in the ocean, or chlorinated water when swimming in a pool, from irritating the eyes or blurring vision. Allow swimmers to see clearly underwater. They will not be usable more than a few feet underwater, because the water pressure will press them tightly against the face. (Below this limit, a diving mask must be used, which allows the user to equalize pressure by exhaling air through the nose.) Examples of these include Swedish goggles.
- Power tools: Must be made of an unbreakable material that prevents chunks of metal, wood, plastic, concrete, and so on from hitting or piercing the eye, usually polycarbonate. Usually has some sort of ventilation to prevent sweat from building up inside the goggles and fogging the surface.
- Blowtorch goggles: These protect the eyes from glare and flying sparks and hot metal splashes while using or near a blowtorch. They are not the correct filters for arc welding.
- Welding goggles: Includes all goggles for eye protection during welding or cutting. They provide protection against debris, the heat from welding, and, with the proper filters, the optical radiation resulting from the welding, which can otherwise cause arc eye.
- Motorcycle riding and other open-air activities: Prevents insects, dust, and so on from hitting the eyes.
- Laboratory and research: Combines impact resistance with side shields to prevent chemical splashes reaching the eyes. May also include laser protection which would be covered by EN 207 (Europe) and ANSI Z 136 (United States). Examples of these include red adaptation goggles.
- Racquetball: Protect the eyes from racquets swinging in an enclosed area and from impact from hard rubber ball.
- Winter sports: Protect the eyes from glare and from icy particles flying up from the ground. Double lens anti-fog ski goggles were invented and patented by Robert Earl "Bob" Smith. Visible Light Transmission (VLT) or S value describes the percentage of light allowed through the lens.
- Astronomy and meteorology: dark adaptor goggles are used before going outside at night, in order to help the eyes adapt to the dark.
- Basketball: Several NBA players have worn goggles during play, including Kareem Abdul-Jabbar, James Worthy, Horace Grant, Kurt Rambis and Amar'e Stoudemire; they prevent a fellow player from scratching or hitting the eyes when trying to grab the basketball. In most circumstances, a player starts wearing protective goggles to prevent further injury to the eyes. They are typically fitted with polycarbonate lenses to ensure impact resistance.
- Gaelic handball and squash: goggles are worn to protect the eye from injury by the ball. The ball used in these sports is smaller than the eye socket, meaning that it can strike the eyeball directly.
- Aviation: In open cockpit aircraft, such as old biplanes, aviators, such as Amelia Earhart and Charles Kingsford Smith, would wear goggles to help protect from the wind and are still in use today. Examples of these include the AN-6530 goggles.
- Virtual reality: A virtual reality headset, sometimes called "goggles", is a wrap-around visual interface to display computer output. Commonly the computer display information is presented as a three-dimensional representation of real-world environments.
- Drunkenness: Goggles designed to simulate the vision altering effects of psychoactive drugs, in particular alcohol. Examples include Fatal Vision goggles. There are no studies that have found beneficial effects of use of fatal vision goggles on the likelihood that individuals will later engage in impaired driving.

== Gallery ==
Goggle type showcase
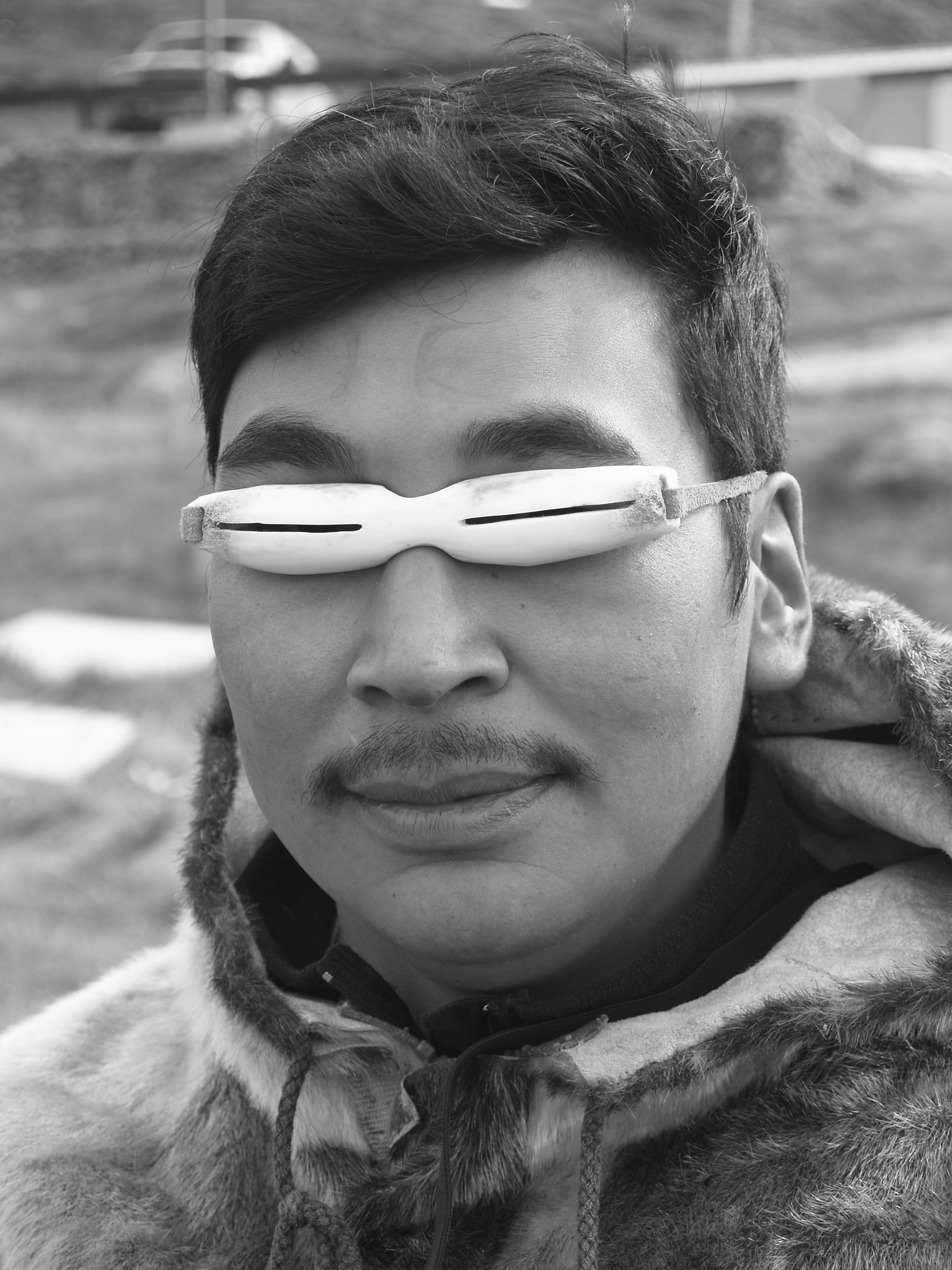
An Inuk wearing traditional snow goggles made from caribou antler with sinew for a strap

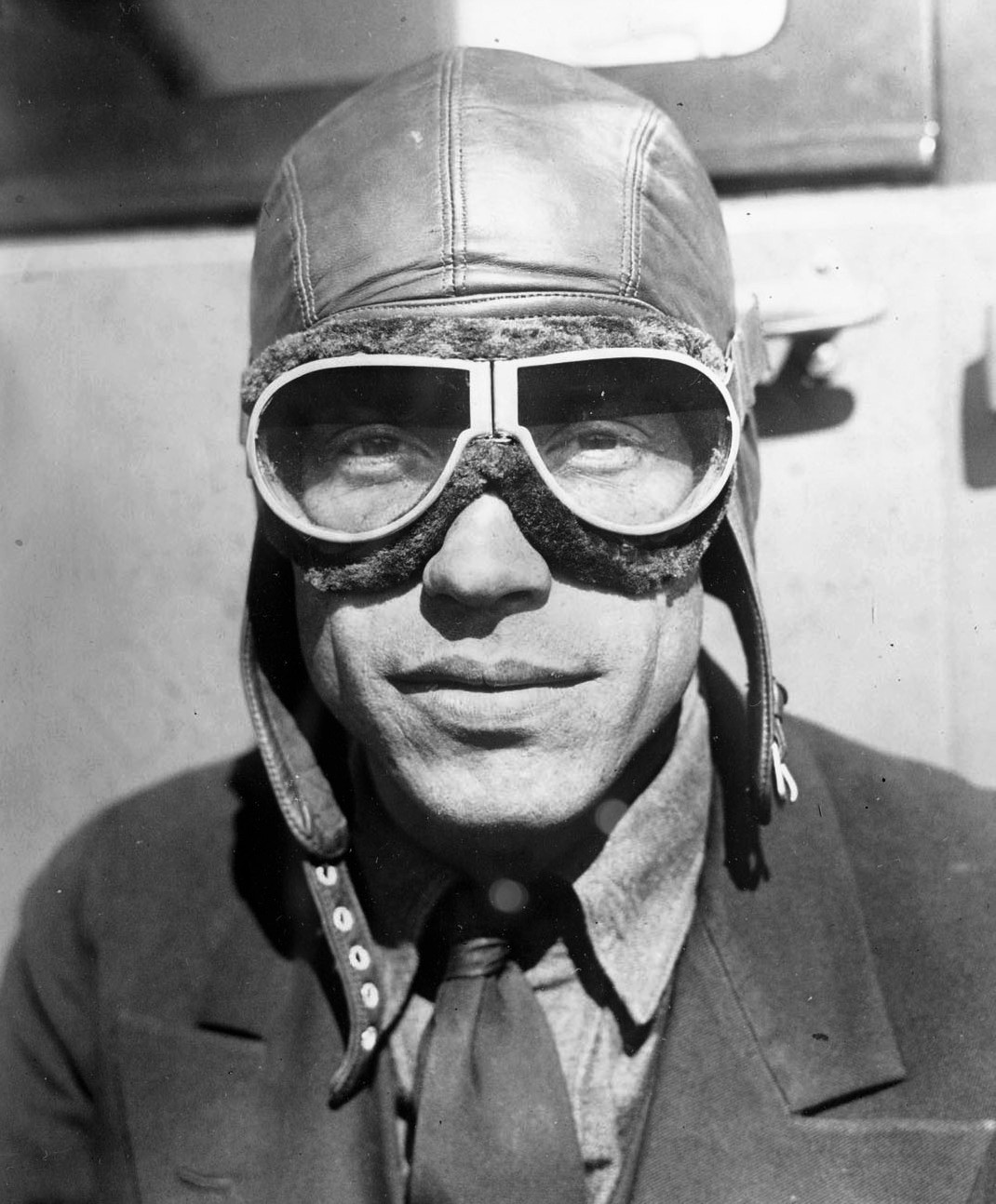
Aviation goggles as worn by Wilmer Stultz in 1928

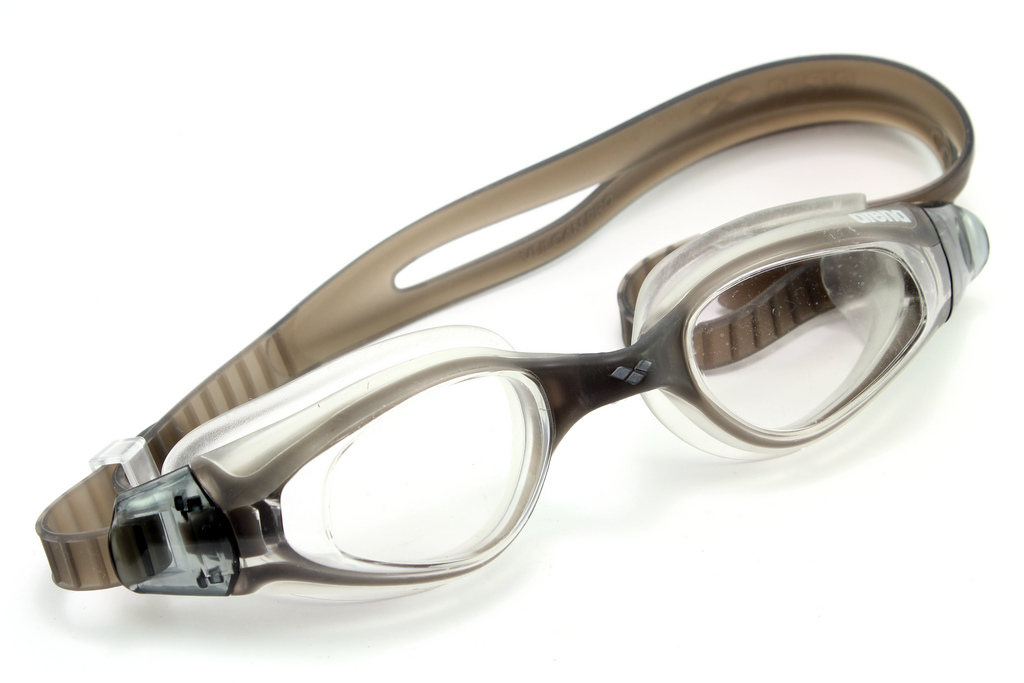
Swimming goggles

Safety goggles and helmets, Bell Aircraft, 1943

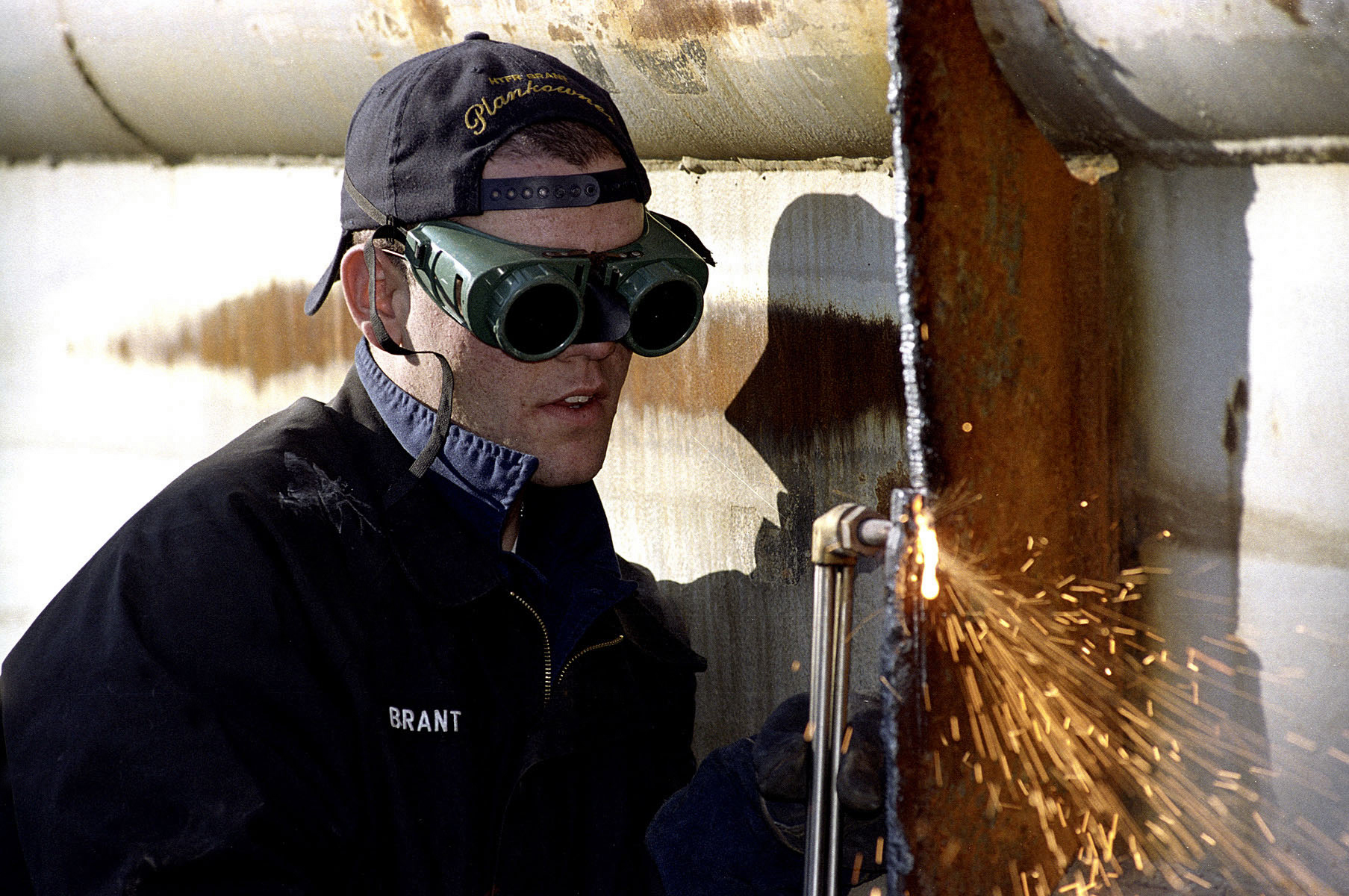
Goggles used in oxy-fuel welding and cutting known as blowtorching goggles

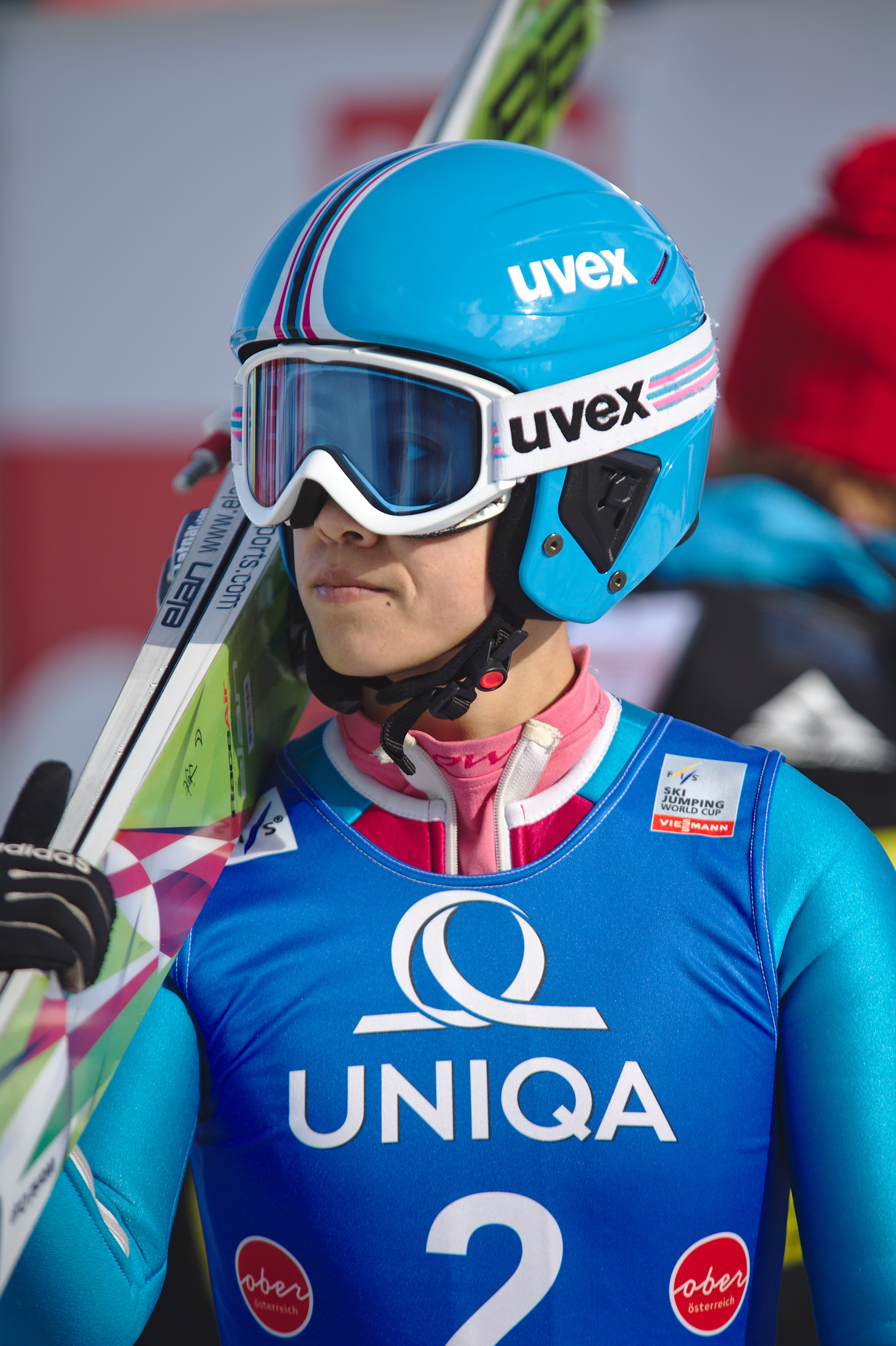
Professional skier Chang Xinyue wearing ski goggles

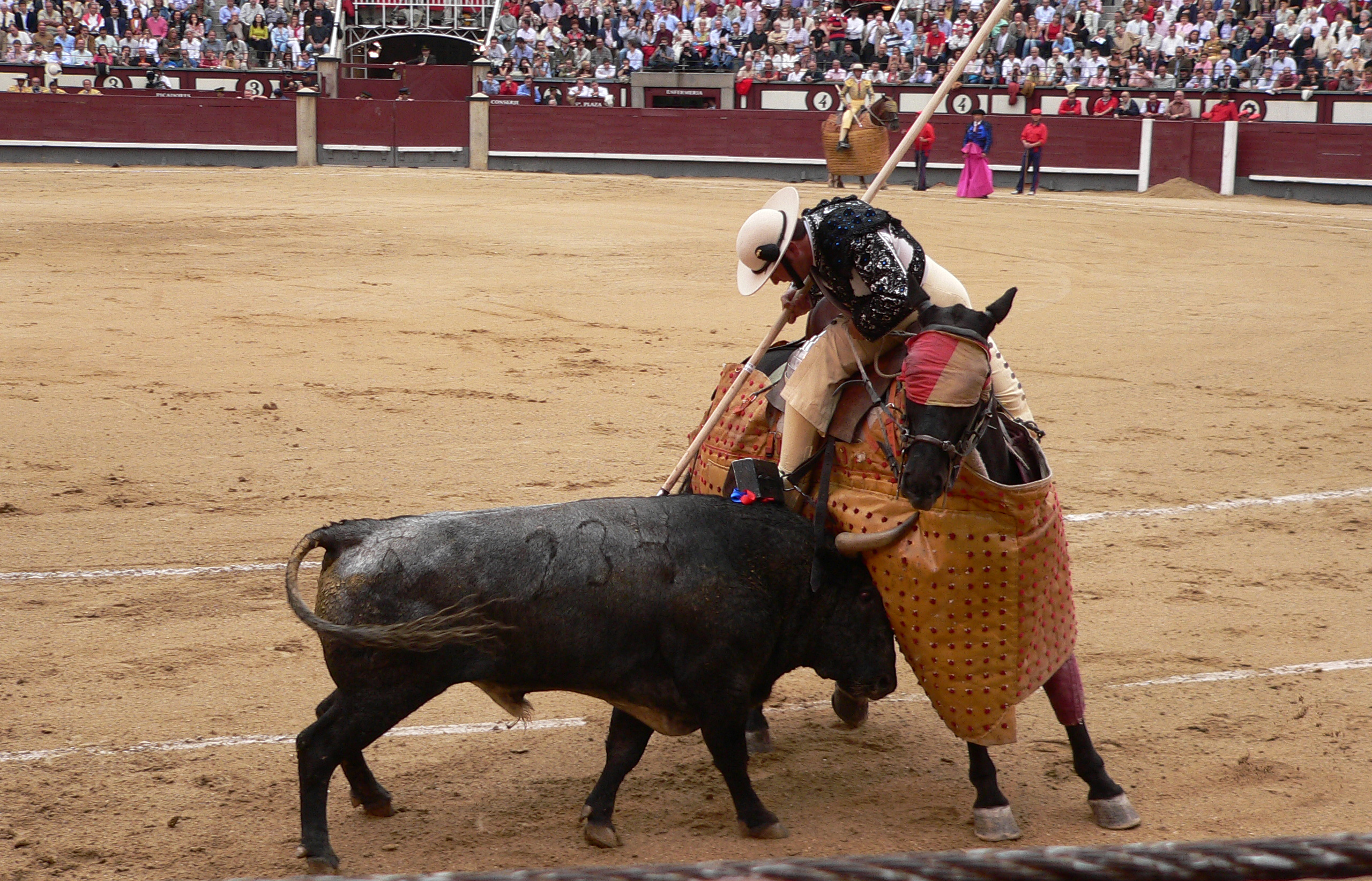
Bullfighting horse wearing eye protection

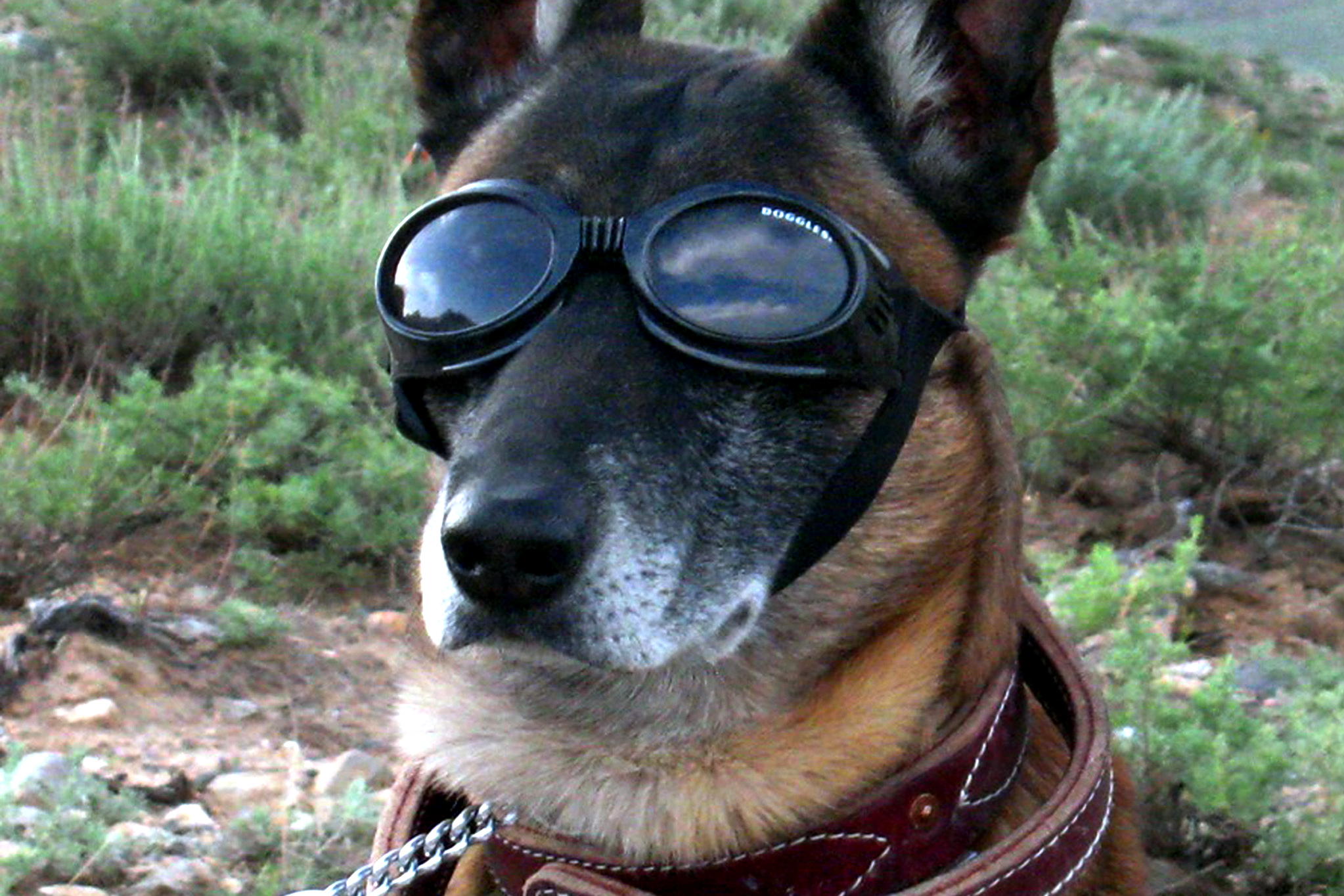
A United States Army Belgian Shepherd wearing Doggles-brand goggles to protect his eyes from dust in Afghanistan

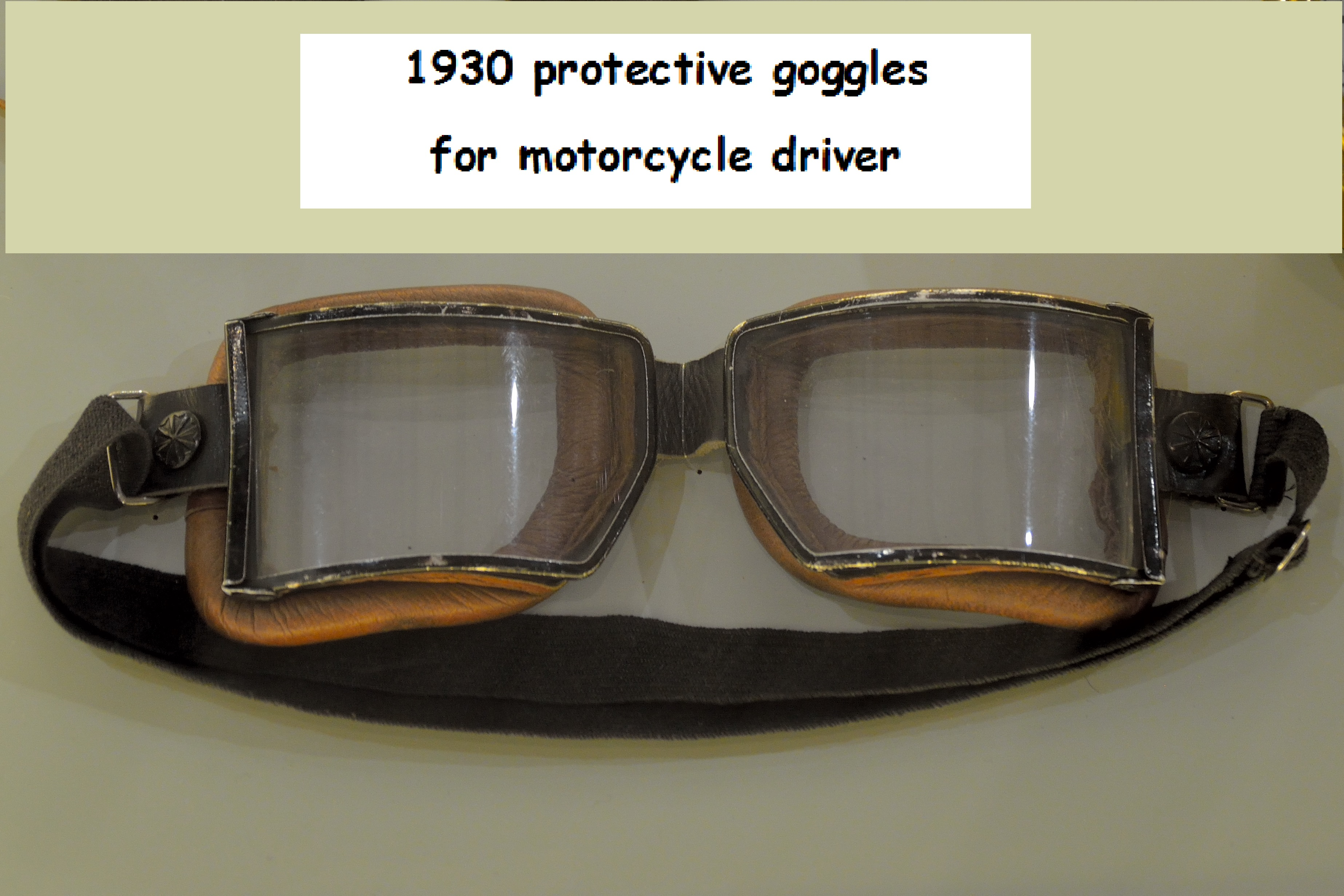
Safety glasses for motorcycle drivers, circa 1930, to protect against rain, wind and insects

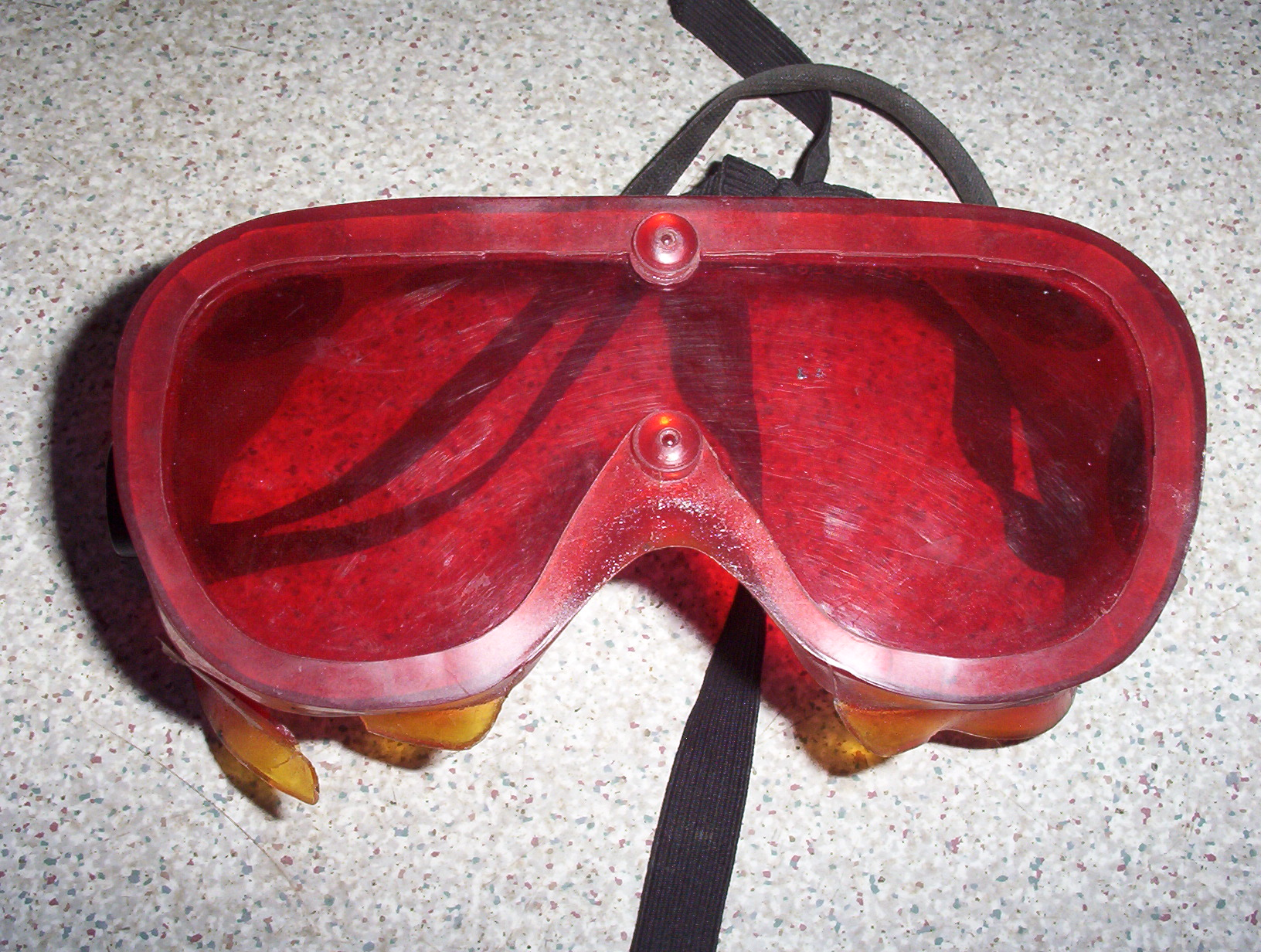
Dark adaptor goggles are used by observers to preserve their natural night vision.

== Fashion ==
A man (accompanied by a woman, two other men, and a monkey) wearing goggles as an accessory over his hat in the early 20th century

Goggles are often worn as a fashion statement in certain subcultures, most often as part of the cybergoth subculture. They are usually worn over the eyes or up on the forehead to secure 'falls': a type of long, often brightly coloured, synthetic hairpiece. Fans of the steampunk genre or subculture also frequently wear steampunk-styled goggles, particularly when performing in a live action role-playing game.

Goggles are also frequently used by anime and manga characters as a fashion statement. For example, it is an idiosyncrasy of team leader characters in the Digimon anime to wear goggles. Other notable characters who wear goggles are the young Naruto Uzumaki and Konohamaru from Naruto, Matt from Death Note and Usopp from One Piece.

== Non-human ==
Goggles are available for horses used in speed sports such as horse racing. In some traditions of horse mounted bullfighting, the horse may wear a protective cloth over its eyes.

Goggles have been used on military working dogs, for protection in harsh conditions, such as sandstorms and rotorwash from helicopters.

== See also ==
- Ballistic eyewear – Protective glasses or goggles
- Beer goggles – Impact of alcoholic inebriation on interpersonal attraction
- Night-vision device – Device that lets the user see in levels of visible light approaching total darkness
- Personal protective equipment – Equipment designed to help protect an individual from hazards
- Safety engineering – Engineering discipline
- Visor – Surface that protects the eyes
