= Chicken eyeglasses =

Small eyeglasses made for chickens

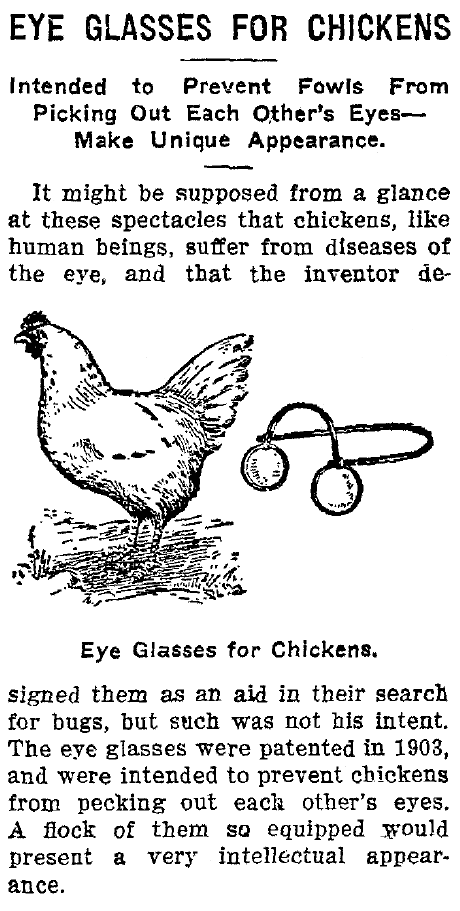
1911 newspaper story on chicken eyeglasses from the Spirit Lake Beacon (Iowa)

Chicken eyeglasses, also known as chicken specs, chicken goggles, generically as pick guards, and under other names, are small eyeglasses made for chickens intended to prevent feather pecking and cannibalism. They differ from blinders in that they allow the bird to see forward, whereas blinders do not. One variety used rose-colored lenses, as the coloring was thought to prevent a chicken wearing them from recognizing blood on other chickens, which may increase the tendency for abnormal injurious behavior. They were mass-produced and sold throughout the United States as early as the beginning of the 20th century.

== Description and purpose ==
Chicken eyeglasses were often made from celluloid or aluminum and typically consisted of "two oval panels that fit over the upper beak of the chicken. A pin is put through the nostril to hold the oval pieces in place." Different designs were produced that attached to the chicken's head in different ways. Some were held in place by a strap, some by small hooks into the nares (nostrils) and some by piercing the bone septum between the nostrils with a cotter pin. Due to the piercing of tissue, this last type of design is illegal in some countries.

Some versions of the devices had semi- or fully transparent lenses, whereas others were tinted, often red- or rose-colored. Other designs were blinders, which are opaque and prevent entirely forward vision. The intended purposes of chicken eyeglasses were to prevent aggressive pecking, cannibalism, and feather pecking.

Chicken eyeglasses are an alternative to beak trimming, which removes approximately one-third of the beak by a cold or heated blade or an infrared beam, usually when chicks are one day old. Beak trimming is often effective in reducing pecking injuries but causes pain and significantly affects chicken welfare.

=== Red-tinted lenses ===
Red-tinted lenses were considered effective in reducing internecine pecking because they disguise the color of blood. As summed up in a 1953 article in Indiana's National Road Traveler newspaper, "The deep rose-colored plastic lenses make it impossible for the cannibal [chicken] to see blood on the other chickens, although permitting it to see the grain on the ground."

Elmer Haas of the National Band & Tag Company, a major producer of rose-colored chicken eyeglasses, whose grandfather had devised wireframes for chickens in 1902, indicated that he believed the purported blood-masking effect of the rose coloring was a myth: "the firm added the rose-colored glasses because it indulged the chicken owners ... [c]hickens are color blind". (In fact, chickens, like other birds, have good color vision.) The firm had added the rose-colored feature to its glasses in 1939 under the brand name "Anti-Pix." This variety of eyeglasses was more complicated than others because the red lenses were fixed to a hinge at the top of the frame. As the hen lowered its head to feed, the lens swung out, giving it an unobstructed view of the ground. When the hen raised her head, as she would during aggression, the lens would swing down giving the hen a red-tinted perception of the environment.

Rose-colored contact lenses, rather than eyeglasses, have also been proposed to reduce cannibalism in chickens.

== History ==
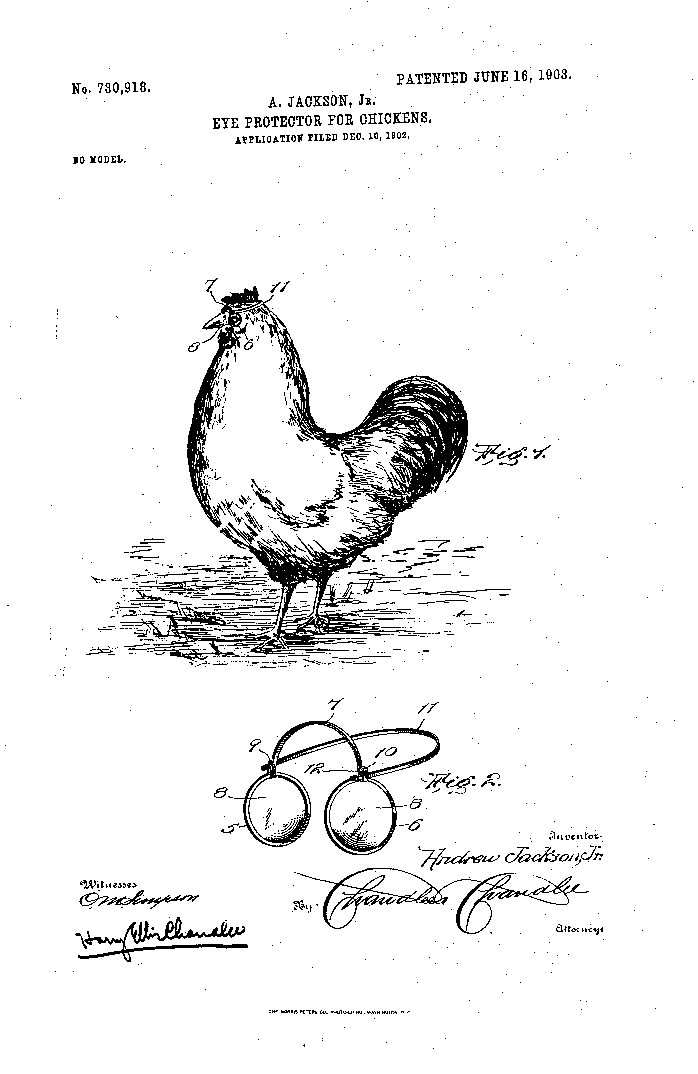
Detail from a 1903 patent filed by Andrew Jackson Jr.

A form of chicken eyeglasses was first patented in 1903 by Andrew Jackson Jr. of Munich, Tennessee, as an "Eye-protector for chickens." In the U.S., they were available through the mail order company Sears-Roebuck or chicken feed stores for a few cents. The eyeglasses are no longer produced by the National Band & Tag Company, but are sought as collector's items.

Using chicken eyeglasses was still practiced in 1973, evidenced by Illinois' The Hawk-Eye newspaper that a farmer had 8,000 chickens fitted with the rose-colored variety. One inventor of a form of the glasses proposed legislation in Kansas to require all chickens in the state to be fitted with glasses, but his campaign was unsuccessful.

== In popular culture ==
On January 16, 1955, Sam Nadler of the National Farm Equipment Company of Brooklyn appeared on CBS' popular primetime television show, What's My Line? The show was in the format of a guessing game, in which a panel attempted to determine the line (occupation) of contestants. Show officials listed Mr. Nadler's occupation for the audience as "sells 'eyeglasses' for chickens". After the panel was unsuccessful in guessing his occupation, Mr. Nadler's identity was revealed, and he stated that his company sold 2–3 million pairs of chicken eyeglasses annually. What's My Line?'s director, Franklin Heller, said in 1958 that the show's "most unusual occupation" over its then eight-season run was "...the gentleman who makes eyeglasses for chickens."

== See also ==
- Blinders (poultry)
- Abnormal behaviour of birds in captivity
- Doggles
- Overview of discretionary invasive procedures on animals
- Vent pecking

== Footnotes ==
1. The use of designs where the septum is pierced is illegal in some jurisdictions on welfare grounds. For example, in the UK's Defra Codes of Recommendations for the Welfare of Livestock: Laying Hens, provides: "The Welfare of Livestock (Prohibited Operations) Regulations 1982 (S.I. 1982 No.1884) prohibits ... the fitting of any appliance which has the object or effect of limiting vision to a bird by a method involving the penetration or other mutilation of the nasal septum."
