= Blinders (poultry) =

Devices fitted to poultry to block their forward vision

From the U.S. Patent "Device to prevent picking in poultry" filed in 1935

Blinders, also known as peepers, are devices fitted to, or through, the beaks of poultry to block their forward vision and assist in the control of feather pecking, cannibalism and sometimes egg-eating. A patent for the devices was filed as early as 1935. They are used primarily for game birds, pheasant and quail, but also for turkeys and laying hens. Blinders are opaque and prevent forward vision, unlike similar devices called spectacles which have transparent lenses. Blinders work by reducing the accuracy of pecking at the feathers or body of another bird, rather than spectacles which have coloured lenses and allow the bird to see forwards but alter the perceived colour, particularly of blood. Blinders are held in position with a circlip arrangement or lugs into the nares of the bird, or a pin which pierces through the nasal septum. They can be made of metal (aluminium), neoprene or plastic, and are often brightly coloured making it easy to identify birds which have lost the device. Some versions have a hole in the centre of each of the blinders, thereby allowing restricted forward vision.

== Benefits ==
In pheasants, blinders have been shown to reduce the incidence of birds pecking each other and damage to the feathers or skin.

In laying hens, blinders have been shown to reduce feather pecking, improve food utilisation (due to less spillage) and increase egg production.

== Welfare concerns ==
Blinders which require a pin to pierce the nasal septum and hold the device in position almost certainly cause pain to the bird. In the UK, the use of these devices is illegal on welfare grounds. The Department for Environment, Food and Rural Affairs in their Codes of Recommendations for the Welfare of Livestock: Laying Hens, states: "The Welfare of Livestock (Prohibited Operations) Regulations 1982 (S.I. 1982 No.1884) prohibits ... the fitting of any appliance which has the object or effect of limiting vision to a bird by a method involving the penetration or other mutilation of the nasal septum."

Studies on pin-less blinders indicate these devices are at least temporarily distressful to the birds. In pheasants, fitting blinders causes an increase in head shaking and scratching, and increases in damage to the beak and nostrils of the bird. Fitting pin-less blinders to laying hens leads to reduced activity, increased resting, adjustment problems in feeding, stereotypic head shaking and protracted displacement neck preening for a month after fitting. In another study on laying hens, mortality was greater among hens wearing blinders compared to hens that had been beak-trimmed.

== See also ==
- Abnormal behaviour of birds in captivity
- Blinkers (horse tack)
- Cannibalism in poultry
- Chicken eyeglasses
- Debeaking and beak trimming
- Doggles
- Feather pecking
- Overview of discretionary invasive procedures on animals
- Peaky Blinders (TV series)
- Peaky Blinders
- Vent pecking
