= Swedish goggles =

Type of swimming goggles

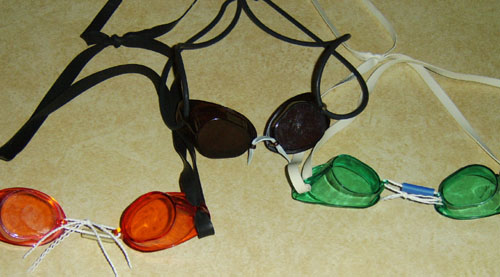
A picture of various pairs of "swedish" style goggles. Note the different nose pieces and the lack of a traditional seal around the eye.

Swedish goggles are a classic and popular type of swimming goggles worn by many competitive swimmers. The original Swedish goggles were produced by the Swedish company Malmsten AB and were first designed in the 1970s. Swedish goggles influenced many other goggle designs and generic Swedish goggles are widely available. Malmsten claims that Swedish goggles are "probably the worlds most copied swim goggles."

Swedish goggles are notable for a lack of a gasket or seal around the eye cup, as found on most other goggles. They come in various colors including clear, black, blue, green, red, amber, pink, silver metallic and bronze metallic. Swedish goggles are relatively low cost, with basic goggles costing around $5 retail and metallic goggle costing around $15.

Much of the popularity of Swedish goggles is due to their customizable fit. The goggles are sold unassembled, with each goggle set including a pair of eye cups, one long (around 36") latex rubber strip, and a nose piece consisting of string that fits inside a plastic or rubber tube. Swimmers may choose a single or double head strap, and some choose to cut a small piece of latex from the head strap for use as a nose piece. Malmsten's official assembly instructions can be found here.

== Assembly ==
Swedish goggles require complete user assembly, which results in a fit that is specifically tailored to their owner. Proper assembly generally requires some skill and practice, as well as precision. Before assembly, the inside edges of the lenses are often filed down to remove any sharp edges and thus improve comfort.

The first step in building a set of Swedish goggles is to construct a nose piece. Nose pieces can feature a variety of designs, some of the most popular include a string threaded through a rubber tube, a short length of the included strap (which is much more easily adjusted than the string), or simply using the string as a nose piece. For nose pieces using the string and tube, a pair of tweezers can be used to guide the string through the small holes located on the inside of the frames, as well as into the rubber tube. A small knot is then tied by hand and threaded into the tube.

Next, the latex strap is guided through the outboard holes of the goggle frames. The loose ends of the straps may be cut off if the user wishes to have a one-strap setup. Otherwise, they may be tied off, creating a two-strap setup and completing goggle assembly.
