= Fatal Vision (goggles) =

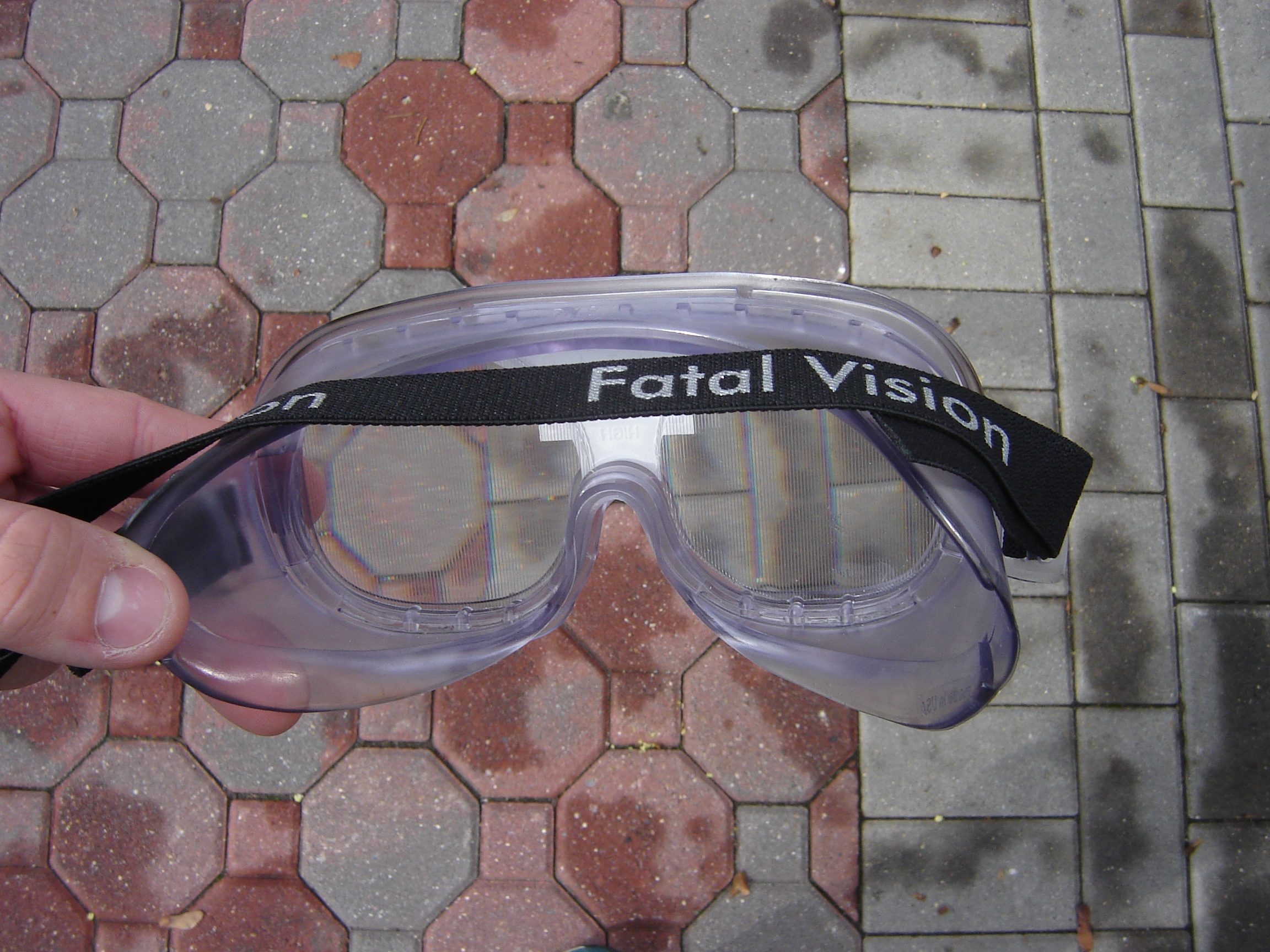
Fatal Vision goggles

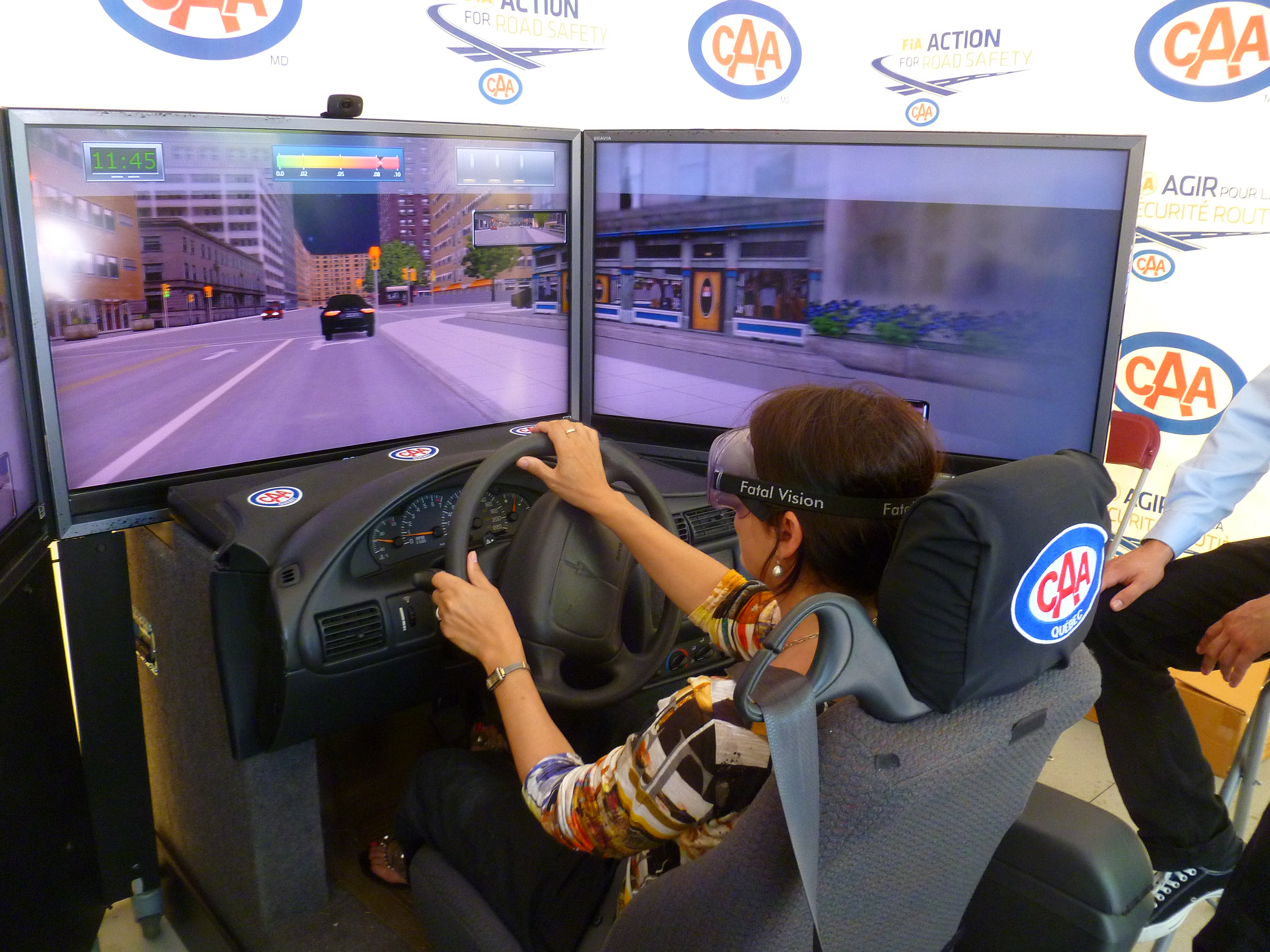
A person operating a driving simulation wearing Fatal Vision goggles

Fatal Vision goggles are a line of training tools for simulating the effects of alcohol and drug intoxication without actually using these substances. The devices have been used by some police departments.

Although a manufacturer (Innocorp Ltd) has claimed that the goggles can be used as an effective tool for teaching people about the effects of alcohol consumption on driving, there are no studies that have found beneficial effects of use of the goggles on the likelihood that individuals will later engage in impaired driving.

Five of the models are intended to simulate five ranges of blood alcohol content: .06% or less, .07% to .10% or so, .12–.15% or so, .17–.20% or so, and .25% or so. A sixth model is said to provide "extreme blurriness and double vision", and thereby simulate intoxication with drugs other than alcohol.
