= Blinkers (horse tack) =

Equipment to restrict a horse's visual field

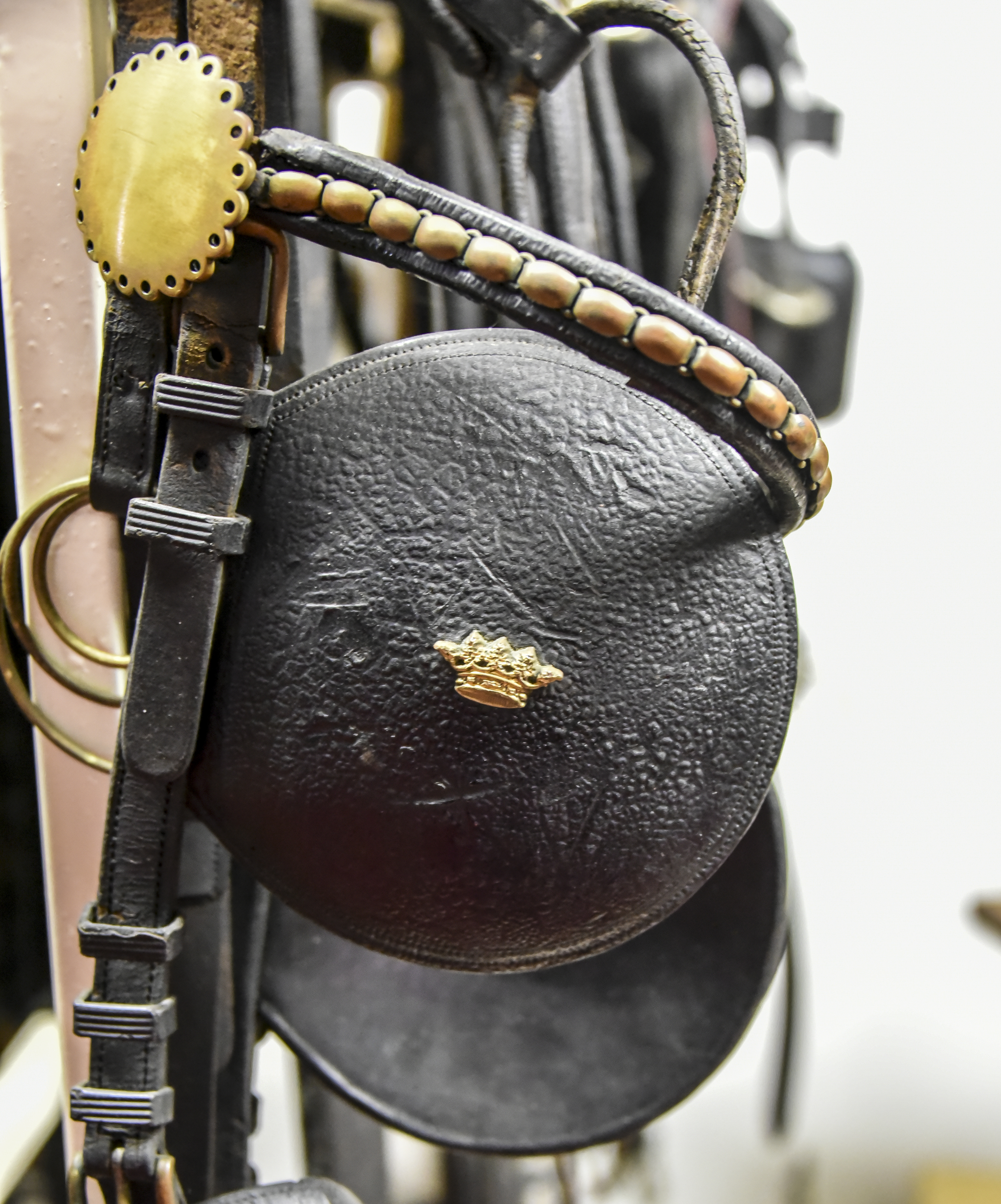
Round blinkers on a driving bridle

Blinkers, also known as blinders, blinds and winkers, are a part of horse harness and tack which limits a horse's field of vision—blocking vision to the sides, the rear, or both. Blinkers are usually seen in horse driving and in horse racing (both harness and ridden), but rarely in horse riding.

== Driving harness ==
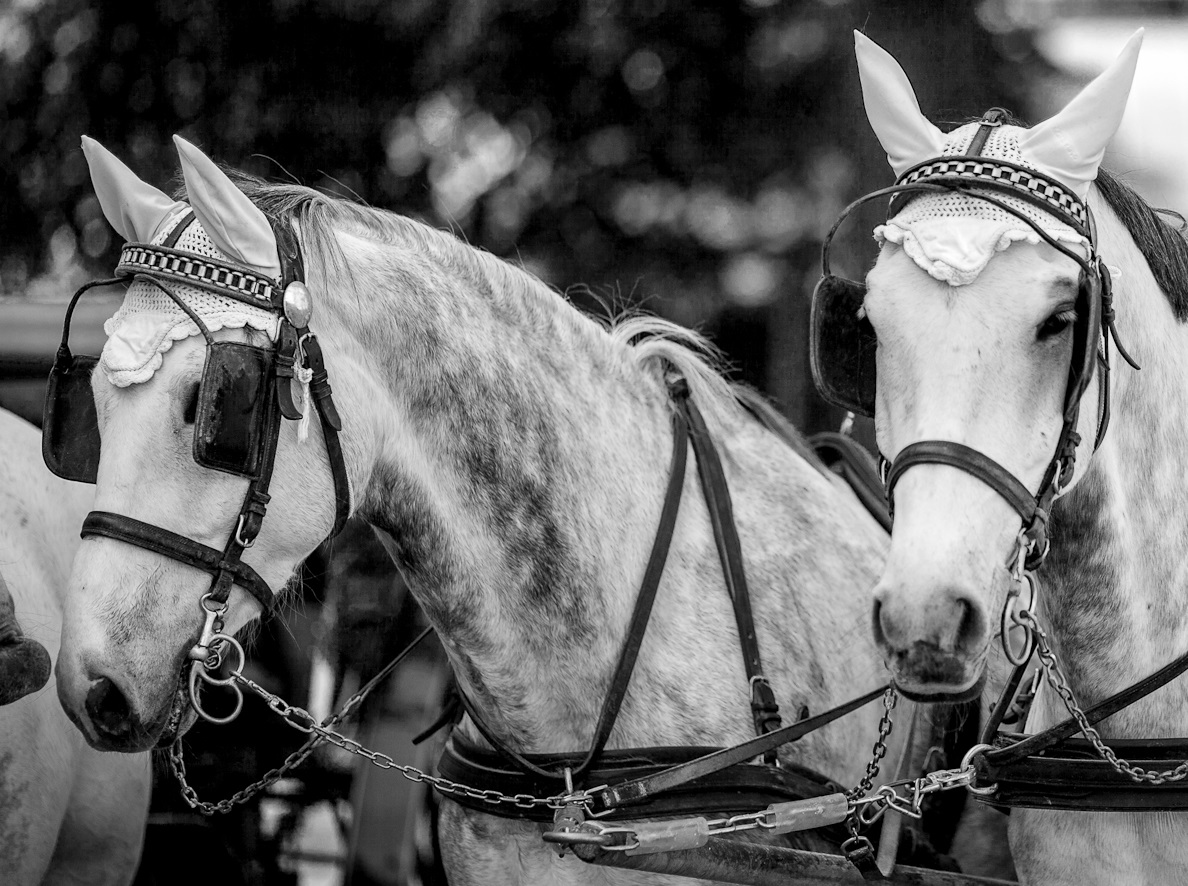
Carriage harness showing blinkers

The bridle on driving harness usually has blinkers attached to the cheekpieces. Blinkers prohibit a horse from seeing what is behind it, while allowing vision forward. Most driving harness blinkers prohibit view to the side. Shapes of blinkers vary by custom. They may be round, square, D-shaped, hatchet-shaped, curved, or other shapes—square being the most common. The blinkers themselves are made of a metal blinker plate covered in leather, patent leather, or other material simulating leather. A blinker stay is a stiff rolled-leather strap that holds the blinkers wide and away from the horse's eyes. The stays join together in the middle, go between the horse's ears, and are attached by a buckle to the crownpiece of the bridle. The buckle allows adjustment of the width of the blinkers. Blinkers may be raised or lowered by buckles in the bridle cheekpieces. Blinkers should be centered on the eye and wide enough to not touch the eyes.

== Horse racing ==
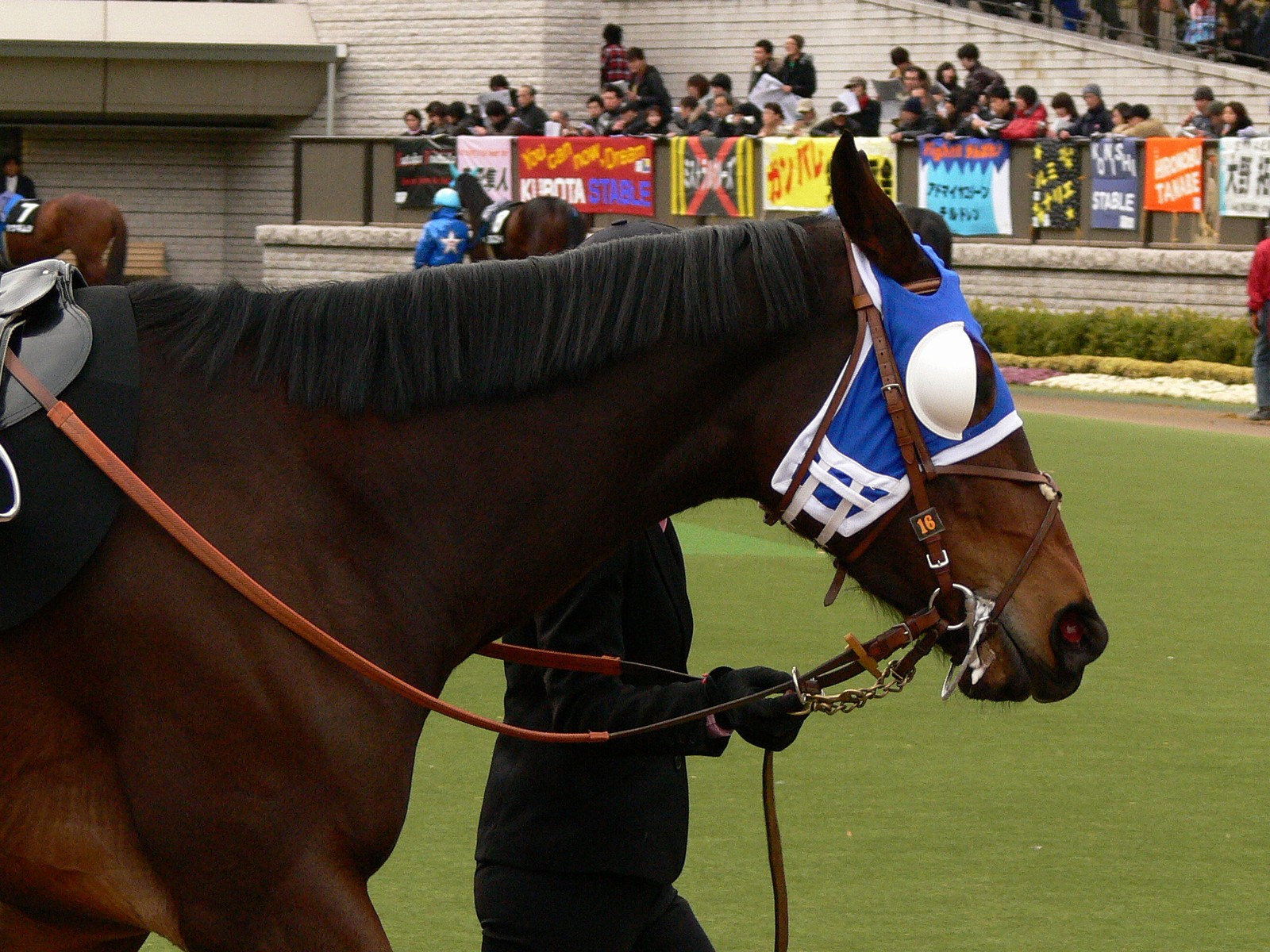
Blinker hood

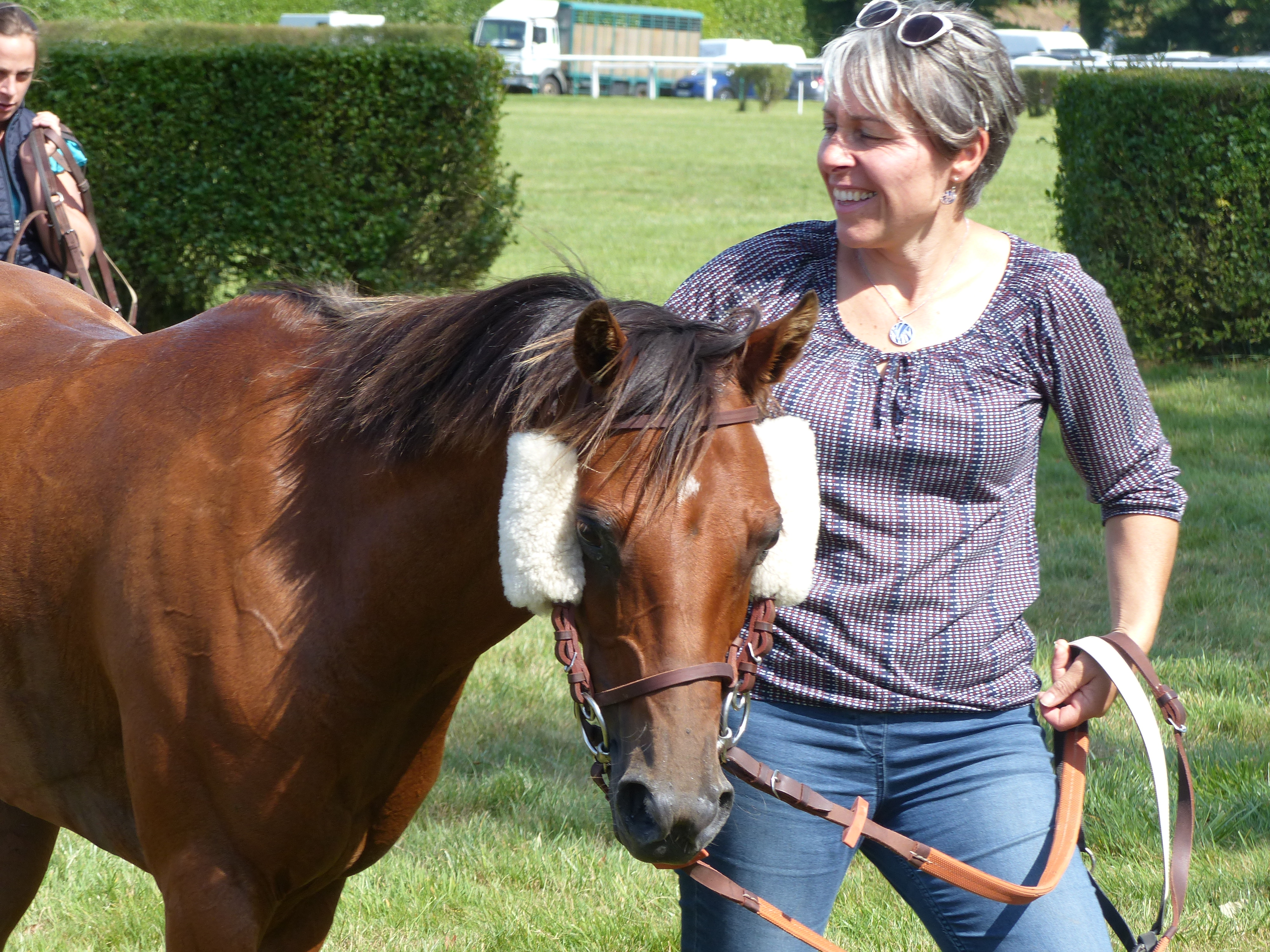
Fleece winkers

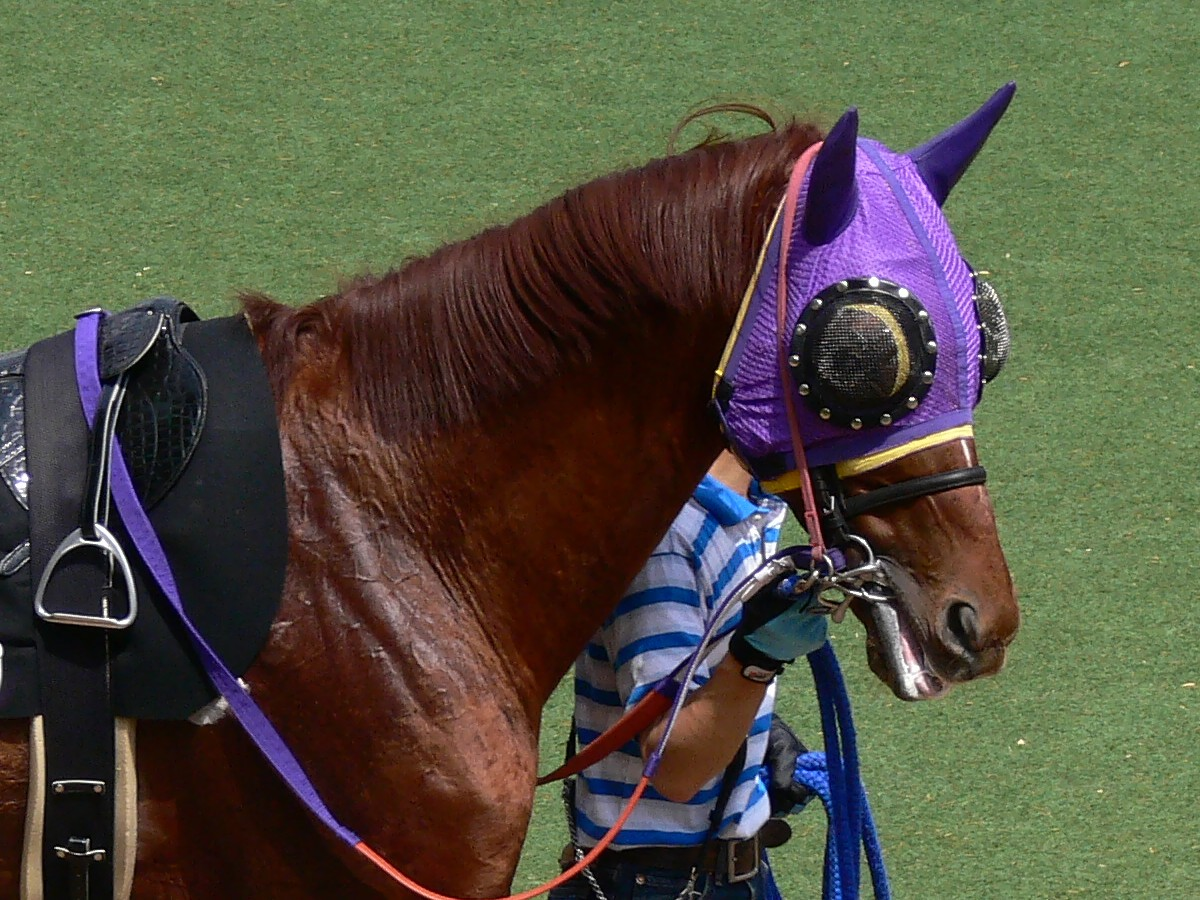
Pacifiers

Horse racing blinkers are constructed as a hood with plastic cups placed on either side of a horse's eyes. The hood is placed under the bridle. Many racehorse trainers believe that blinkers keep horses focused on what is in front, encouraging them to pay attention to the race rather than to distractions such as crowds.

Visor blinkers have a peep hole cut in the back of the cup.

Fleece winkers are tubes of fleece placed on the cheekpieces of a bridle and are a mild form of blinkers. They limit a horse's rear vision but do not restrict the horse's view as much as blinkers do.

Pacifiers are hoods with mesh cups over the eyes. Pacifiers protect the wearer's eyes from injury caused by dirt or stones being kicked up by horses ahead of the wearer during a race. They may be banned from use on wet days as they may clog up with mud.

== Other uses ==
A blinder is a name used in the United Kingdom for a bag or cloth blindfold put over the head of a difficult horse while it is being handled—for example, when being loaded into starting gates or being mounted.

== See also ==
- Equine vision
- Blinders (poultry)
