= AN-6530 goggles =

Type of flying goggles

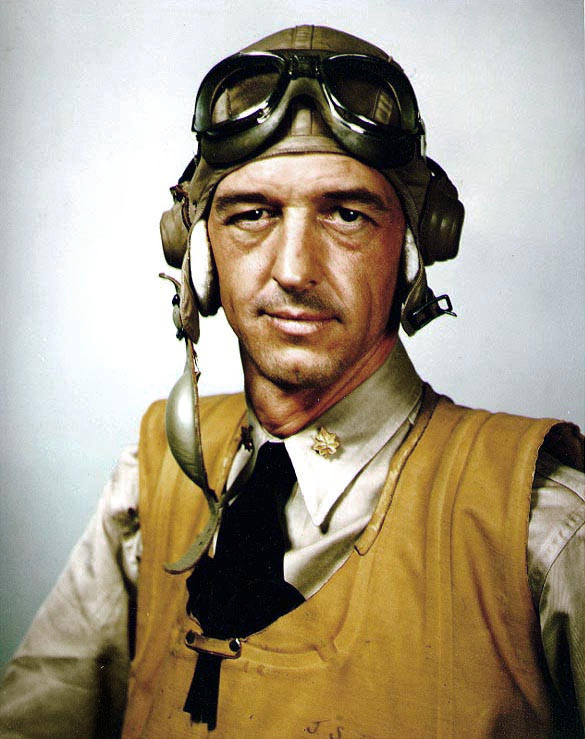
LCDR John S. Thach wearing AN6530 goggles in 1942.

AN-6530 Goggles were produced during World War II as eye protection for United States Army and Navy flight crews. In 1943, the AN-6530 design served as a product modification of the USAAF B-7 goggle produced by Chas Fischer Spring Company of Brooklyn, New York. Contracts for AN-6530 goggles were awarded to Chas Fischer Spring Co. and American Optical.

== Construction ==
The AN-6530's frame is nickel-plated brass and steel. Construction consists of stamped and milled pieces, soldered together. Milled brass pieces form the bridge and ferrule/strap lugs, and pieces of stamped sheet steel form the frame to hold the facepad and lenses. The ferrule / strap lugs are split lengthwise to facilitate removal and insertion of the lenses and rubber facepad. The lugs are secured closed by a salt-blued or parkerized and knurled carbon steel ferrule.

The frame has vents on the upper and lower edge. The upper vents were produced in two patterns. One using a small brass tube with the inward open end faced slightly forward along the top edge of the frame. The other with a lower profile design that consists of a stamped and soldered channel, curved along the upper edge of the frame with two milled openings, one facing forward and one downward. The frame's lower edge vents are three depressions or three sets of small holes on the flat area of the underside. The two-piece milled bridge acts as a hinge and the larger midsection of the hinge is stamped 'AN 6530'. The manufacturer's identification / inscription can usually be found stamped on the left half of the frame's underside of the Charles Fischer Spring Co. goggles. The American Optical goggles are not identified. Regarding the vents, many collectors believe the tube-type were "early" design and the streamlined vents were "later design". The truth is both tube-type and streamline-type vents were being produced at the same time- the difference was Charles Fischer using his patented streamlined vents in the construction of his B-7s, Navy Mk-II and AN-6530s, while American Optical was using their own tubular design. This difference in vent design is useful to distinguish a Charles Fischer Spring goggle from an American Optical-made goggle at first glance. Also on the lower vents, AO used small round pinholes, while Charles Fischer used triangular-shaped stamped vent holes. No such thing as "early tube-type" or "later streamlined vent-type".

The facepad is a single piece of natural gray medium-density rubber. Leather chamois is glued to the face side to increase comfort and prevent bonding to the skin due to low temperatures at high altitudes. Nickel-plated or salt-blued steel rings are sewn to the frame side of the pad, which allow connection to the frame by resting in the frame's inner channel. Some came with right and left eye cushions made of soft rubber. Parts numbers are 33B5021-3 for the right cushion and 33B5021-2 for the left.

The strap is 1-inch-wide (25 mm) black, white or gray cotton webbing with interwoven rubber tensioners. Hardware consists of nickel-plated or salt-blued steel wire bails at either end with a stamped nickel-plated or salt-blued steel adjuster. The wire bails are inserted through holes in the ends of the frame's strap lugs and are retained by their own clip tension design. The bails also act as retainers for the lug ferrules.

AN-6530 lenses are ground and polished optical glass, approximately 3/32 of an inch (2.4 mm) thick. These share their design with B-7, Navy Mk-II and commercial 'Skyway' brand goggles. They were produced in clear, amber, green, and a high-density dark green for gunnery to facilitate spotting targets against the sun. Lens contractors were American Optical, Bausch & Lomb Optical and Libby-Owens-Ford. Small quantities of clear plastic lenses were produced in response to lenses being shattered by flying debris during combat use.

== Use ==
AN-6530 goggles saw use in nearly every type of U.S. flight crew position during World War II, particularly with pilots, gunners and observers who needed protection from glare, wind and debris.

Expense in production technique, time, and materials and issues with lenses shattering and contributing to eye injury led to the development of the rubber-framed, plastic-lensed B-8 goggle. The B-8 goggle was standardized in 1944, making the AN-6530 obsolete.

Despite its one-year run as standard issue, the AN-6530 goggle became an icon of its era and is now highly sought after by collectors.
