= Doggles =

Goggles for dogs

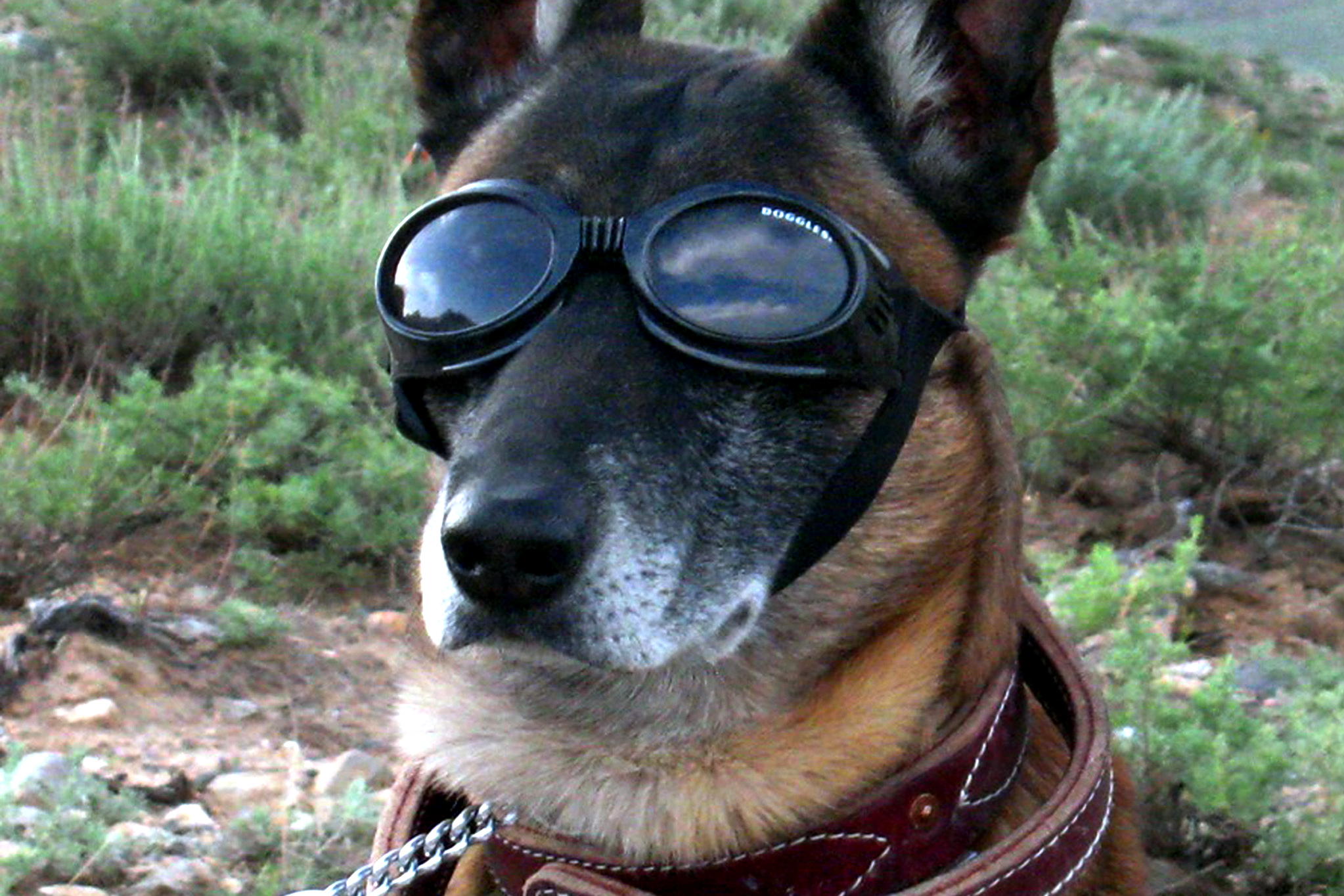
- A U.S. Army Belgian Malinois wearing Doggles to protect his eyes from dust in Afghanistan
- Inventor: Roni Di Lullo
- Manufacturer: Doggles, Inc

Doggles are a commercial brand of eye protection for dogs in the form of tinted goggles designed and manufactured to fit the shape of a dog's head.

While marketed as a fashion item, several practical and medical uses have been reported, and prescription lenses for dogs with impaired eyesight are available.

== Invention and construction ==
Doggles were invented by Roni Di Lullo after she noticed her dog, Midknight, squinting in the sunlight. Experiments were made with human sunglasses and sports goggles before a pair was developed to fit the shape of a dog's head. They are now produced by the Doggles Company in Diamond Springs, California.

Doggles are constructed out of a tinted polycarbonate material for UV protection, with elastic straps to secure them to the dog's head.

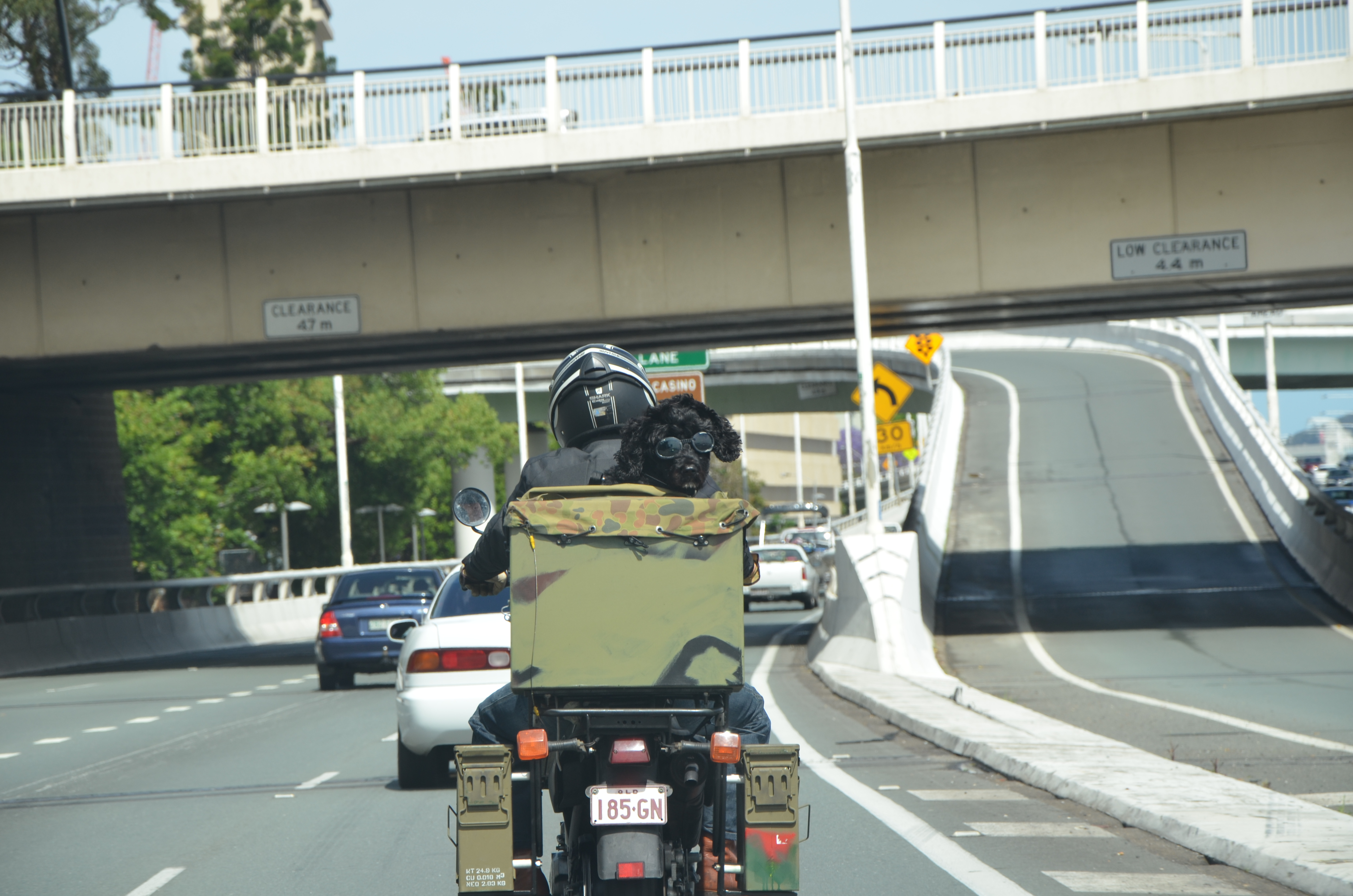
Dog wearing Doggles while travelling on the back of a motorcycle

Doggles were ranked No. 6 in a list of "10 ideas that shouldn’t have worked – but made millions" by MSN Money, and by 2004, were being sold in 4,500 shops in 16 countries and now include the option of prescription lenses.

== Uses ==
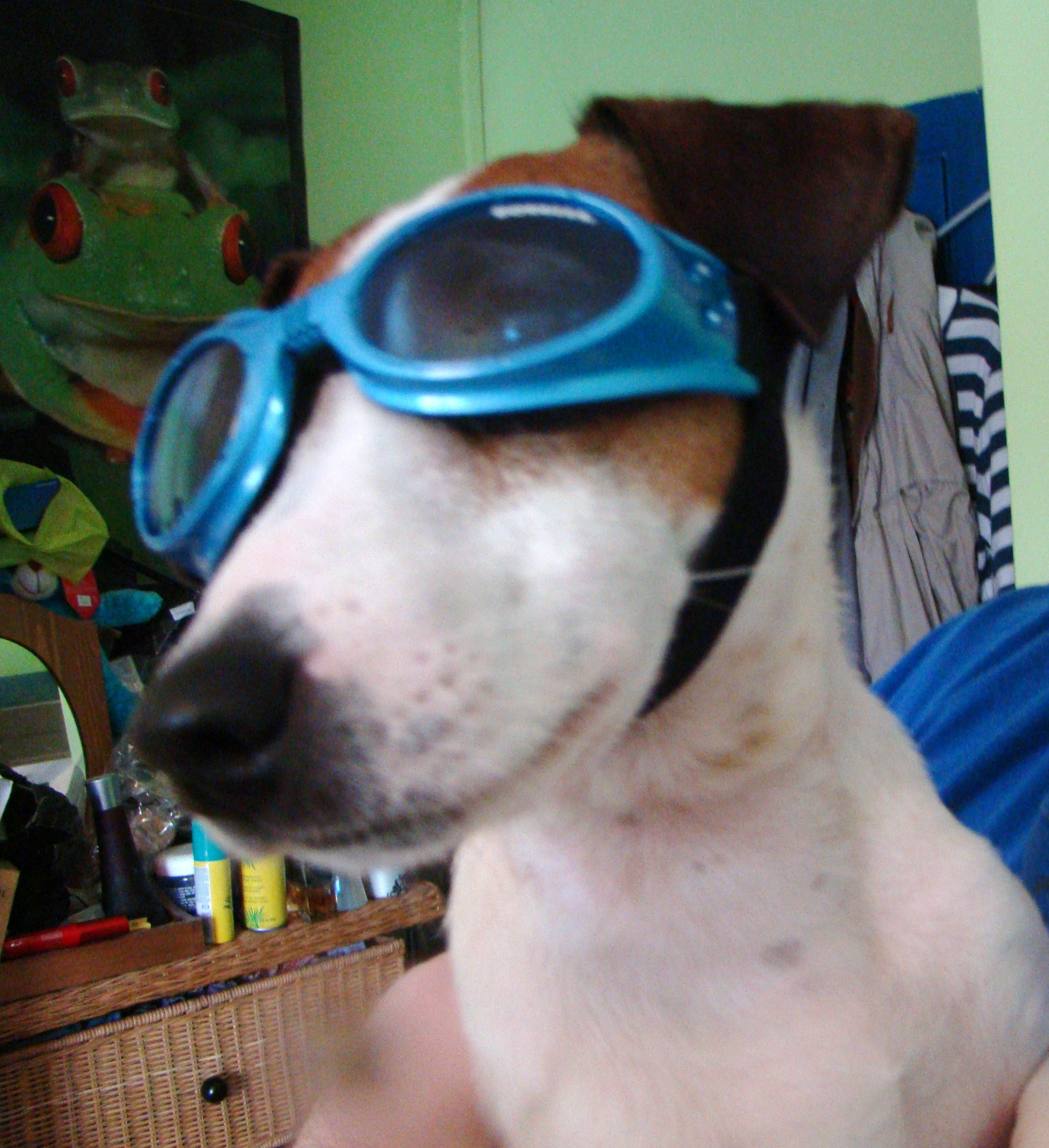
A Jack Russell Terrier wearing a pair of blue Doggles.

In 2004, Linda Cunningham was organizing supply packs to be sent out to U.S. Army dogs working in Iraq. During her research she came across Doggles and thought of them as protection from the sun and also from the effects of the desert sandstorms. She contacted the Doggles Company and together they have sent over 120 pairs of Doggles out to Iraq for the military working dogs. Doggles were also featured in a CNN Saturday Morning News segment about equipment being sent out to military dogs on 30 July 2005.

The British newspaper Metro reported in March 2007 the story of a dog suffering from a rare autoimmune disorder which means its eyes cannot produce tears. The owner, Diana Stephens, has the dog wear Doggles in order to prevent its eyes from drying out.

Uses of Doggles for other eye conditions have also been reported. Veterinarian Pete Wedderburn reported in his Daily Telegraph blog in 2009 the case of a terrier that suffered from an ophthalmological condition in which tiny specks of debris were floating around inside its eyes. When exposed to bright sunshine, the dog would twist to its side while snarling and yelping; something that was originally thought to be the exacerbation of an existing arthritis condition. A pair of Doggles was ordered, and while the terrier did not initially like wearing them, they did solve the problem. Eventually the owner found that a baseball cap designed for dogs proved to be the solution as the terrier did not mind wearing it. Many dogs seem to become used to the Doggles after a few minutes.
