= The Hedge Knight (A Knight of the Seven Kingdoms) =

- A Knight of the Seven Kingdoms episode
- Episode no.: Season 1 Episode 1
- Directed by: Owen Harris
- Written by: Ira Parker
- Cinematography by: Gustav Danielsson
- Editing by: Simon Brasse
- Original air date: January 18, 2026
- Running time: 42 minutes

Guest appearances
- Daniel Ings as Lyonel Baratheon; Shaun Thomas as Raymun Fossoway; Tanzyn Crawford as Tanselle; Danny Webb as Arlan of Pennytree; Henry Ashton as Daeron Targaryen; Daniel Monks as Manfred Dondarrion; Bamber Todd as young Dunk; Tom Vaughan-Lawlor as Plummer; Carla Harrison-Hodge as Beony; Rowan Robinson as Red; Edward Ashley as Steffon Fossoway; Danny Collins as Humfrey Beesbury; Ross Anderson as Humfrey Hardyng

Episode chronology
← Previous —	Next → "Hard Salt Beef"

"The Hedge Knight" is the series premiere of the American fantasy drama television series A Knight of the Seven Kingdoms. Written by co-creator and showrunner Ira Parker and directed by Owen Harris, it premiered on HBO on 18 January 2026. George R. R. Martin, author of the Tales of Dunk and Egg novellas, on which the series is based, is credited as co-creator and executive producer alongside Parker. The episode introduces Dunk (Peter Claffey), a lowborn hedge knight, and depicts his chance encounter with the young boy who will become his squire, Egg (Dexter Sol Ansell).

The episode received critical acclaim, with praise for its fidelity to the source material, the relationship between Dunk and Egg, the humour, the light tone, and the performances of Claffey, Ansell, and Daniel Ings. It was viewed by 6.7 million viewers in its first three days, making it the third-best premiere in HBO Max history.

== Plot ==
Dunk, a young man who squired for Ser Arlan of Pennytree, buries his deceased mentor, who died during their journey to the town of Ashford, where a tournament is being held. Dunk considers selling Arlan's three horses and joining the City Watch in King's Landing, but after picking up Arlan's sword and shield, he decides to enter the tournament. Dunk visits an inn, where he meets a bald, insolent boy who insists on becoming his squire. After a strange encounter with a drunken nobleman, Dunk finds the boy wearing Arlan's armor and mounted on his warhorse. Dunk berates the boy and refuses his help before leaving alone.

After arriving in Ashford, Dunk meets with Plummer, Ashford's steward, to register for the tournament. Dunk claims that Arlan knighted him before dying, but Plummer explains that Dunk can only participate if someone vouches for him. Plummer also warns Dunk that losing in the tournament means forfeiting his horses and armor to the winner and paying a ransom to get them back, which Dunk cannot afford. Dunk seeks out Ser Manfred Dondarrion, as Arlan previously served his father. A pair of prostitutes initially mock him for his ragged appearance and say that Manfred is sleeping, before sympathizing with his situation. While wandering the tournament grounds, Dunk witnesses Ser Steffon Fossoway training with his cousin and squire, Raymun. Without a pavilion of his own, Dunk camps outside the tournament grounds.

Later that evening, Dunk returns to Manfred's tent to find him still unavailable. He then watches a puppet show featuring a fire-breathing dragon performed by Tanselle. Raymun invites Dunk to a banquet, where he meets the charismatic Ser Lyonel Baratheon. After dancing together, Lyonel expresses doubt that Dunk will perform well in the tournament against trained knights. Dunk soon finds Manfred, but he does not remember Arlan and dismisses him.

Dunk returns to his camp and finds the bald boy waiting for him, who has taken the initiative to clean the camp and care for the horses. The boy introduces himself as Egg and tells Dunk he needs a better name if he is going to become a knight. Dunk names himself Ser Duncan the Tall and agrees to take Egg on as his squire. That night, they see a shooting star, which Egg believes will bring good luck to those who see it. Dunk wonders if the luck will be theirs alone.

== Production ==
=== Conception and writing ===
Ira Parker and George R. R. Martin created A Knight of the Seven Kingdoms from the series of novellas Tales of Dunk and Egg, begun by Martin with the publication of The Hedge Knight (1998), the volume that gives the episode its name and serves as the basis for the first season. In January 2021, HBO announced the development of a television adaptation with Parker and Martin as executive producers and, in November, brought Steven Conrad on board as a screenwriter. In April 2023, the network gave the project the green light, at which point Conrad was no longer involved. By then, Parker, writer of the fourth episode of the first season of House of the Dragon, had completed the script for the pilot episode, which Martin described as "terrific". Later, in May, it was specified that Parker would also take on the role of showrunner. In May 2024, the production appointed Owen Harris as director.

Parker declared himself a fan of A Song of Ice and Fire and the world of the saga, stating that the series allowed him to integrate personal experiences from Dunk's perspective, including stepping outside his comfort zone. Parker described the archetype of the hedge knight as representing a solitary and itinerant life. The series was organised around a personal crisis for Dunk, triggered by the death of his mentor, a circumstance that forces the character to ask himself "what is next for him". Parker questioned the decisive value of the ceremonial act of knighting and argued that the willingness to help others in one's immediate environment more authentically defines what it means to be a knight.

=== Casting ===
HBO announced Peter Claffey and Dexter Sol Ansell as Dunk and Egg on April 5, 2024. Ansell topped the list of candidates for the role of Egg from the outset, and according to Parker, after seeing his audition, he thought about hiring him immediately, although the casting director advised him to review the rest of the auditions. At that time, the production did not propose other actors for the other characters. The selection process lasted several months, and the final round of auditions focused on the chemistry between the actors. When Parker and Harris saw Claffey and Ansell together, they said it was "the least stressful decision we've ever had to make", and Parker described the final choice of Ansell as "going back to the beginning".

The supporting cast for the episode includes Daniel Ings as Lyonel Baratheon, Shaun Thomas as Raymun Fossoway, Tanzyn Crawford as Tanselle, Danny Webb as Arlan of Pennytree, Daniel Monks as Manfred Dondarrion, Tom Vaughan-Lawlor as Plummer, Carla Harrison-Hodge as Beony, Rowan Robinson as Red, Edward Ashley as Steffon Fossoway, Ross Anderson as Humfrey Hardyng and Henry Ashton as Daeron Targaryen. Additionally, Bamber Todd plays a young version of Dunk. Ings and Crawford were announced in June 2024, while Thomas, Webb, Ashton, Monks, Vaughan-Lawlor and Ashley were announced in August.

=== Music ===
Dan Romer composed the original music for the episode. His approach sought to reflect the restrained scale of the story and differentiate it from the grandiose sound associated with Game of Thrones. Romer explained that he focused on instrumentation based mainly on guitar and piano. The soundtrack incorporates jazz nuances and takes inspiration from westerns, with adaptations that allow it to be integrated into the sound universe of Westeros without directly reproducing those genres. The composer worked closely with Parker; when they found melodies they liked, they tried them out with different instruments. As part of the musical design, the team developed specific themes for the characters of Duncan and Egg, conceived as malleable melodic structures capable of adjusting to different harmonies. Romer stated that he wanted most of the music to be perceived as if it could be "made on the side of the road".

== Reception ==
=== Broadcast and ratings ===
Although it was initially announced that the series would premiere in late 2025, in September of that year, Casey Bloys, president and chief content officer of HBO and HBO Max, denied that information and specified that the launch would take place in January 2026. Subsequently, on October 9, during New York Comic Con, the exact premiere date was officially confirmed as January 18. The episode was previewed on January 13 in Berlin as part of the HBO Max launch event in Germany. The episode recorded 6.7 million viewers in the United States during its first three nights of availability, counting both linear viewership and HBO Max streams, making it the third most-watched premiere in the platform's history during that initial period.

=== Critical response ===
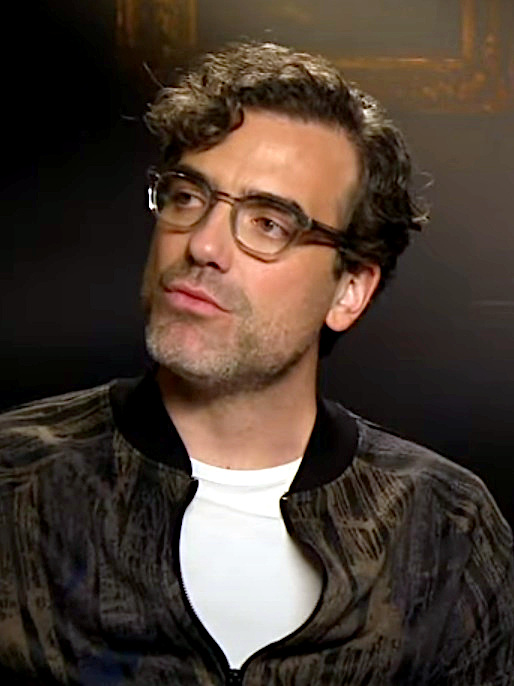
Critics praised Daniel Ings's performance.

The review aggregator Rotten Tomatoes gave "The Hedge Knight" a 100% approval rating based on 13 reviews. The website's consensus described the episode as "small-scale but with powerful characterisation and a sober narrative that offers a well-trodden world with a duo worth rooting for". Critics highlighted the chemistry between Claffey and Ansell, as well as Ings's performance. IGN's Jim Vejvoda and CBR's Katie Doll noted that Claffey and Ansell stood out for the interaction between their characters; Vejvoda considered this to be the core of the series. Both highlighted Ings's performance, whom Doll described as the most charismatic adaptation of a member of House Baratheon. Tell-Tale TV's Sarah Novack said that Claffey and Ansell were born to play their roles and highlighted Ings as one of the most notable elements of the episode.

The Ringer's Riley McAtee praised the show's fidelity to the original material and considered the additions to be positive. Novack agreed with this assessment and added that the changes strengthen the narrative. The A.V. Club's Jarrod Jones gave a favourable review of the slow pace and modest scale compared to the previous series. TV Fanatic's Alexandria Ingham described the tone as light and humorous and called the episode a "wonderful start". Vejvoda considered the episode a pleasant and promising start, with notable humour, and called the series a solid entry point into the universe created by Martin. Collider's Kendall Myers praised the introduction of the characters from Dunk's perspective. Vulture's Noel Murray described the episode as a "lighter, sweeter, and funnier" version of A Song of Ice and Fire. Pop Culture Maniacs' Jean Henegan called it "refreshing" and expressed satisfaction with what was shown. But Why Who?'s Kate Sánchez called it "infinitely endearing". Den of Geek's Lacy Baugher commented that the opening sequence, which seems to feature the Game of Thrones theme song, was "refreshing".

Vejvoda noted that McCullagh's production design and Mugan's costumes maintain the aesthetic of Game of Thrones, and that Romer's score and bucolic landscapes evoke a harmony closer to Middle-earth than to the world of A Song of Ice and Fire.
