= In the Name of the Mother =

- A Knight of the Seven Kingdoms episode
- Episode no.: Season 1 Episode 5
- Directed by: Owen Harris
- Written by: Hiram Martinez; Ti Mikkel; Ira Parker
- Cinematography by: Gustav Danielsson
- Editing by: Simon Brasse; Paulo Pandolpho
- Original air date: February 15, 2026
- Running time: 37 minutes

Guest appearances
- Bertie Carvel as Baelor Targaryen; Daniel Ings as Lyonel Baratheon; Sam Spruell as Maekar Targaryen; Danny Webb as Arlan of Pennytree; Finn Bennett as Aerion Targaryen; Shaun Thomas as Raymun Fossoway; Youssef Kerkour as Steely Pate; Henry Ashton as Daeron Targaryen; Ross Anderson as Humfrey Hardyng; Danny Collins as Humfrey Beesbury; William Houston as Robyn Rhysling; Edward Ashley as Steffon Fossoway; Bamber Todd as young Dunk; Chloe Lea as Rafe; Edward Davis as Alester; Daniel Monks as Manfred Dondarrion; Steve Wall as Leo Tyrell; Rowan Robinson as Red; Cara Harris as Gwin Ashford; Paul Hunter as Lord Ashford

Episode chronology
← Previous "Seven"	Next → "The Morrow"

"In the Name of the Mother" is the fifth episode of the first season of the American fantasy drama television series A Knight of the Seven Kingdoms. Written by Hiram Martinez, Ti Mikkel, and co-creator Ira Parker, and directed by Owen Harris, it aired on HBO on February 15, 2026. In the episode, Dunk (Peter Claffey) faces Aerion Targaryen (Finn Bennett) in the brutal Trial of Seven. Years earlier, Dunk considers abandoning his miserable life in Flea Bottom when his friend Rafe (Chloe Lea) proposes they leave for the Free Cities.

The episode was filmed in Belfast in 2024. Parker and Harris decided to depict the trial exclusively from Dunk's perspective, using first-person shots from his helmet to reflect the tension and confusion of battle. The production faced a number of challenges, including wasps on set, noise from fog machines, and budget constraints that limited the scale of the combat and the number of extras. In the United States, "In the Name of the Mother" attracted 9.2 million viewers in its first three days. The trial scenes were acclaimed by critics, who highlighted Claffey's performance, the direction, production design and combat choreography, while the flashbacks received mixed responses for their placement within the season, although their overall execution was viewed positively.

== Plot ==
Prince Baelor Targaryen gathers the knights supporting Dunk for the trial of seven and explains that the three members of the Kingsguard supporting Prince Aerion Targaryen cannot harm him as they are bound by oath to protect the royal family. A herald entreats the Seven Gods for fair fighting. Once the trial begins, Dunk is struck by Aerion's lance during the first charge, and as he attempts to counterattack, his horse stumbles. Dunk suffers a serious wound to his side and is struck by a flail, knocking him unconscious.

Thirteen years earlier, a young Dunk lives in Flea Bottom with his friend Rafe. The pair loot a battlefield near King's Landing, collecting items from corpses. In Flea Bottom, Rafe pickpockets from corrupt City Watchman Alester. Dunk wonders if he will see his mother again. Dunk and Rafe attempt to buy passage to the Free Cities in Essos, but cannot afford it. Alester and his companion find them and take their money. Rafe steals Alester's dagger, but he notices and slits her throat, horrifying Dunk, who is also injured. Ser Arlan of Pennytree intervenes and kills Dunk's attackers. Dunk then follows Arlan after he leaves King's Landing until Dunk collapses from his injury. He is subsequently taken under Arlan's wing as his squire.

Back in the present, the trial of seven continues as Dunk faces Aerion in a long, violent duel. Dunk sustains multiple wounds, eventually falling unconscious. Aerion declares that Dunk is dead, but Egg calls to Dunk from the crowd and begs him to keep fighting. Dunk envisions Arlan telling him to get up and he regains consciousness. As the crowd cheers for him, Dunk manages to stand and overpower Aerion, who quickly yields. Dunk then drags Aerion before Lord Ashford and forces Aerion to withdraw his accusation, ending the trial.

Dunk receives treatment for his wounds and learns that both Ser Humfrey Beesbury and Ser Humfrey Hardyng died fighting for him during the trial. Dunk emotionally pledges fealty to Baelor, who asks for help in removing his helmet, which had been damaged by the mace of his younger brother, Prince Maekar Targaryen. When the back of Baelor's head is exposed, revealing a fatal head wound, he collapses and dies in Dunk's arms.

== Production ==
=== Conception and writing ===
Hiram Martinez, Ti Mikkel, and series co-creator Ira Parker co-wrote "In the Name of the Mother", while Owen Harris directed it. HBO announced Harris as one of the series' directors in May 2024. Harris noted that the trial sequence was designed to keep the point of view centered on Dunk throughout the entire fight and emphasized that the viewer remains "inside his helmet", perceiving every blow from his perspective. He explained that this decision gave the confrontation a more painful and raw tone, in contrast to other duels that alternate between both contenders. He acknowledged that, although he analyzed major previous battle sequences such as "Battle of the Bastards" (2016), he avoided imitating its massive scale. Instead, they opted for a chaotic and intimate approach. Parker, for his part, commented that he wanted the audience to feel the weight of putting on the armor and helmet, as well as Dunk's exhaustion and fear. He underscored that, despite his size, he is not a good fighter and that being knocked off his horse at the beginning of the episode demonstrates it.

Regarding the use of flashbacks in the middle of the battle, Harris explained that interrupting the fight at the moment Dunk is knocked unconscious was intended to sustain dramatic tension while also deepening his past. He stated that the Flea Bottom sequence shows how never knowing his father, losing his mother, his friend Rafe, and the harshness of the environment shaped his determination, which, according to him, provides a new understanding of Dunk when he returns to the fight, a moment which he compared to Rocky (1976). Peter Claffey, who portrays Dunk, noted that after being unhorsed, he draws upon the toughness learned in Flea Bottom, distinguishing between "fighting like a knight" and "fighting like a survivor". He indicated that this resilience and determination ultimately allow him to prevail over Aerion. Parker highlighted that, although smaller, Aerion is better trained and equipped, making him a real danger. It was important to him that the fight convey that constant threat until the moment Dunk lands a decisive blow that changes the dynamic of the confrontation.

Harris emphasized the importance of sound design in the scene in which Dunk is stunned after the blow. He explained that they sought to recreate the character's altered perception —the persistent ringing, the distortion of the surroundings, and the sense of disorientation— so that the audience would experience his state of confusion from within. According to him, the treatment of sound made it possible to express the physical impact and subjective experience of the moment in a way that the image alone could not achieve. In relation to Ser Arlan, he praised Danny Webb's performance and stated that despite his limited screen time, the actor managed to bring honesty, humor, and presence to the character, reinforcing the formative influence he had on Dunk. He added that he found the story especially compelling due to the revelation about what it means to be a knight; according to him, although the term evokes an idealized image, in Dunk's case nobility is not defined by appearance or sophistication, but by the adoption of a moral code. He indicated that it is not an inherited title, but something that must be earned.

Parker explained that the team decided "very early" to structure the sequence with a flashback to Dunk's childhood in Flea Bottom and to the death of his friend, even while being aware that interrupting the battle might generate divided reactions. He admitted that he "hated" including it at that moment, but stated that he believed the scene functioned autonomously and provided context for both the character and the episode's outcome.

=== Casting and characters ===
According to Finn Bennett, who portrays Aerion, Harris insisted that the visible exhaustion of both characters would be key to selling the combat sequence. Bennett described long days filming in the mud and noted that the accumulated fatigue contributed to conveying the brutality and physical toll on Dunk and Aerion, which made him feel proud of that sequence. Claffey, for his part, indicated that together with stunt coordinators Florian Robin and C.C. Smiff, they aimed for the blows to feel "almost ground-level and very forceful". The third member of the Kingsguard participating on the accusing side in the trial, Ser Willem Wylde, was not credited in the episode. As Harris explained, the character was portrayed by a stunt double rather than a credited actor, since he did not have a prominent narrative arc within the story.

Carvel considered the analogy of comparing Baelor to Eddard Stark, the character portrayed by Sean Bean in Game of Thrones, to be valid, as both characters are guided by honor and justice, though he noted differences in the identity and traditions of their respective houses. Parker qualified the comparison by stating that Baelor is less naïve and acts with full awareness of the risks. He recalled that Baelor was celebrated from a young age as a war hero during the First Blackfyre Rebellion, which solidified his reputation as an honorable figure and a potential great king. According to Parker, the trial represents the moment in which that honor is put to a concrete test. Carvel indicated that Baelor's arc appealed to him due to its emphasis on heroism and highlighted that the character repeatedly questions Dunk's worthiness as a knight, and that he "must ask himself the same question when the decisive moment arrives".

=== Filming ===
The episode was filmed in 2024 in Belfast (Northern Ireland). Bennett noted that part of the props included fruit baskets which, not being replaced, decomposed on set and attracted numerous wasps. Parker added that the presence of wasps also became an issue in post-production, as it was necessary to digitally remove visible insects from several shots. Additionally, Daniel Ings, who portrays Lyonel Baratheon, stated that the use of smoke machines to set the atmosphere of the episode generated high noise levels during recording, which, according to Shaun Thomas, who portrays Raymun Fossoway, added complexity to the coordination of actors, stunt performers, and the technical crew.

The team organized the trial sequence through a detailed breakdown on a whiteboard installed in a tent on set. Parker recalled that filming conditions were variable: the mud had to be kept wet with hoses when it did not rain, the wind altered the direction of the artificial fog, and the fake blood attracted more wasps. He described the process as chaotic and noted that this was accepted from the early stages of production. Bennett attributed much of the result to his stunt double, Zach Roberts, and mentioned the difficulty of acting with limited visibility under the helmet. Ings also mentioned the logistical challenges of coordinating the horses in the scenes preceding the fight, where keeping seven riders aligned proved especially complex.

Parker also indicated that budgetary limitations influenced the creative solutions adopted for the trial sequence. He stated that the lack of resources forced the team to develop more inventive narrative and visual approaches than they would have employed with a larger budget. He highlighted the use of fog over the Ashford field, an element described in the novella The Hedge Knight by George R. R. Martin. Parker maintained that its inclusion was important for fidelity to the source material and that it responded to a principle of "function over form". He also acknowledged that the fog was intensified to conceal logistical limitations, particularly in the depiction of the crowd witnessing the fight, given that the series had a considerably smaller budget compared to Game of Thrones and House of the Dragon.

== Reception ==
=== Broadcast and ratings ===
The episode aired on HBO on February 15, 2026. The episode had 9.2 million viewers in the United States on its first three nights, including linear viewers and streams on HBO Max. On linear television, it had 0.592 million viewers.

=== Critical response ===
The review aggregator Rotten Tomatoes gave "In the Name of the Mother" an 85% approval rating based on 13 reviews. Some critics positively compared Baelor Targaryen's death to that of Eddard Stark. IGN's Jim Vejvoda called the cast "uniformly solid", but noted that Peter Claffey gave "his best performance yet"; he also felt that Chloe Lea "made the most" of her limited screen time. Similarly, But Why Tho?'s Kate Sánchez argued that Claffey's performance stood out as one of the most significant in the Game of Thrones universe. CBR's Katie Doll praised Harris's direction, calling it "magnificent"; she also highlighted the special effects, make-up, set design and stunt choreography, which she called "flawless"; she singled out Dexter Sol Ansell for using "the full force of his voice to scream and cry when necessary".

Vejvoda described the episode as "shocking in every way" and "half medieval Rocky, half heartbreaking coming-of-age story". Den of Geek's Lacy Baugher noted that the episode features a bloody confrontation that could lead viewers to anticipate a scaled-down version of the "Battle of the Bastards". However, she argued that the series subverts those expectations and continues to challenge the conventions associated with the franchise. The New York Times's Sean T. Collins described the final scene as "powerfully sad". Sánchez stated that it was a "perfect" episode and one of the most successful examples of the use of flashbacks on television; she considered it the best individual episode of the franchise and also one of the best television episodes in general; she particularly highlighted the ending. Doll praised the entire trial sequence as a "masterpiece" and called it one of the "most powerful ever seen on television". She also stated that the trial is a "tremendous feat" and described the sequence as "one of the most exciting the Game of Thrones franchise has produced in years". Vulture's Noel Murray praised the staging and direction. He said he was "very impressed" by how the fight was filmed, highlighting the physicality, chaos and visual rawness of the confrontation; he compared the moment when Dunk gets up after appearing defeated to Rocky. Polygon's Tasha Robinson pointed out that the battle is "intensely personal". Screen Rant's Fariba Rezwan stated that, after waiting more than a week for the outcome of the trial, the episode did not disappoint her. She highlighted the battle, which she described as "brutal", the flashback sequence, which she considered "crucial", and a death that she described as "shocking".

For The A.V. Club's Jarrod Jones, halting the trial at its "most dramatic" moment was a "risky" creative decision; he argued that the flashback provides historical context that will serve future seasons well, but that the pause "at this point" may feel like filler to those "expecting immediate action". Still, Jones said it would be "well-directed and well-written filler". He also appreciated the production design of Flea Bottom and Lyonel Baratheon's armour. Murray noted that he was initially sceptical about the decision to interrupt the fight with an extensive flashback; however, he stated that the series narratively justifies this choice and highlighted that the additions to the original novella enrich the characters. Doll described the episode as "split in two" and "the most disjointed yet". She thought there were "many positive things" about the flashback sequence, such as Dunk's first impression of Ser Arlan or the setting of Flea Bottom, but she couldn't help wondering what exactly its purpose was. She felt that the introduction of Rafe's character and the emphasis on Dunk's mother were too sudden, making the flashback an "invasive" device that interrupted the narrative momentum. In her opinion, the scene was poorly placed and ineffective; she compared it to "Stranger in a Strange Land" from Lost (2004–2010). However, she qualified this by saying that "In the Name of the Mother" manages to hold its own thanks to the strength of its main timeline.

=== Awards and nominations ===
Award	Category	Nominee(s)	Result	Ref.
Primetime Creative; Arts Emmy Awards	Outstanding Cinematography for a Series (Half-Hour)	Gustav Danielsson	Nominated	
Primetime Creative; Arts Emmy Awards	Outstanding Music Composition for a Series (Original Dramatic Score)	Dan Romer	Nominated	
Primetime Creative; Arts Emmy Awards	Outstanding Sound Editing for a Comedy or Drama Series (Half-Hour) and Animation	Various (Note: Alastair Sirkett, Martin Cantwell, Michele Woods, Adéle Fletcher, Ruth Knight, Neil Stemp, Barnaby Smyth, and Rebecca Glover)	Nominated	
Primetime Creative; Arts Emmy Awards	Outstanding Special Visual Effects in a Single Episode	Various (Note: Arron Roebuck, Paul Russo, Luke Dhand, Angel Rico Riesgo, Sonsoles L. Aranguren, Rocío Ruiz de Azúa, Mike Dawson, Tom Lloyd, and Paul Tuersley)	Nominated	
Primetime Creative; Arts Emmy Awards	Outstanding Stunt Performance	Various (Note: Zach Roberts, Gyula Tóth, Chris Cox, and Jake Cox)	Won	
