= A Knight of the Seven Kingdoms (disambiguation) =

A Knight of the Seven Kingdoms may refer to:

- A Knight of the Seven Kingdoms, the title of the collected novellas of Tales of Dunk and Egg
- "A Knight of the Seven Kingdoms" (Game of Thrones), the second episode of the eighth season of Game of Thrones
- A Knight of the Seven Kingdoms (TV series), a television series and prequel to Game of Thrones
