= Critics' Choice Super Award for Best Actor in a Science Fiction/Fantasy Series =

Critics' Choice Super Award for Best Actor in a Science Fiction/Fantasy Series, Limited Series or Made-for-TV Movie
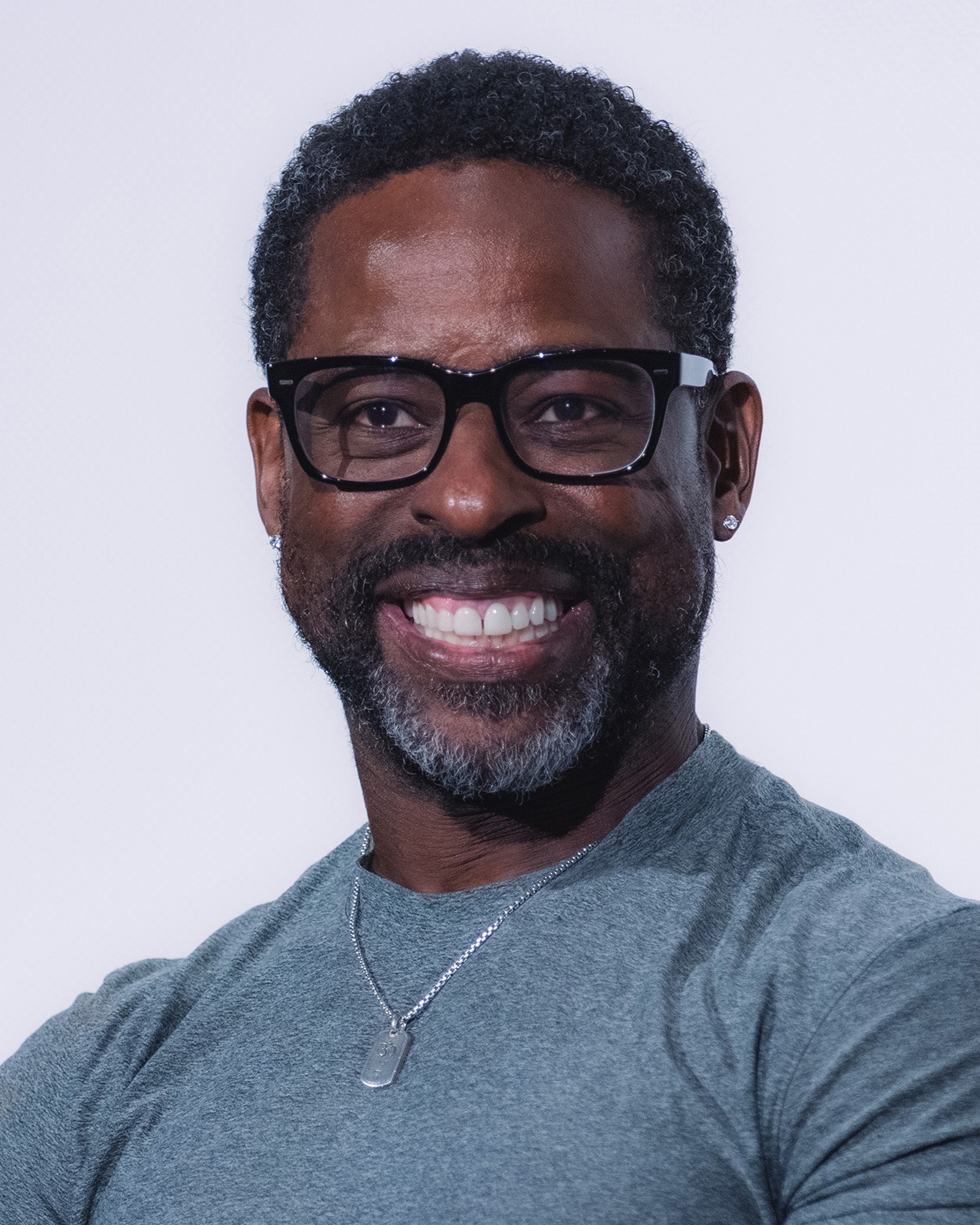
- The 2025 recipient: Sterling K. Brown
- Country: United States
- Formerly called: Best Actor in a Science Fiction/Fantasy Series
- First award: 2021
- Currently held by: Sterling K. Brown, Paradise (2026)

Highlights
- Most nominations: Ncuti Gatwa; Diego Luna; Anson Mount; Patrick Stewart; Adam Scott; Matt Smith (2)
- Website: http://www.criticschoice.com/

The Critics' Choice Super Award for Best Actor in a Science Fiction/Fantasy Series, Limited Series or Made-for-TV Movie is an award presented by the Critics Choice Association to the best performance by an actor in a science fiction or fantasy television series or TV Movie.

This award was first presented in 2021 to Patrick Stewart for his role as Jean-Luc Picard on Star Trek: Picard. The most nominated actors in this category are Ncuti Gatwa, Diego Luna, Anson Mount, Patrick Stewart, Adam Scott and Matt Smith, with two nominations each.

The current recipient of the award is Sterling K. Brown for his role as Xavier Collins in Paradise.

== Winners and nominees ==
| Year | Actor | Role | Series | Network | Ref |
Best Actor in a Science Fiction/Fantasy Series
| 2021 | Patrick Stewart | Jean-Luc Picard | Star Trek: Picard | CBS All Access | |
| 2021 | Robbie Amell | Nathan Brown | Upload | Amazon Prime Video | |
| 2021 | Travis Fimmel | Marcus/Caleb | Raised by Wolves | HBO Max | |
| 2021 | Sam Heughan | James "Jamie" Fraser | Outlander | Starz | |
| 2021 | Kayvan Novak | Nandor the Relentless | What We Do in the Shadows | FX | |
| 2021 | Pedro Pascal | The Mandalorian/Din Djarin | The Mandalorian | Disney+ | |
| 2021 | Nick Offerman | Forest | Devs | FX on Hulu | |
| 2022 | Daveed Diggs | Andre Layton | Snowpiercer | TNT | |
| 2022 | Henry Cavill | Geralt of Rivia | The Witcher | Netflix | |
| 2022 | Matthew Goode | Matthew Clairmont | A Discovery of Witches | Sundance Now | |
| 2022 | Jared Harris | Hari Seldon | Foundation | Apple TV+ | |
| 2022 | Lee Pace | Brother Day | Foundation | Apple TV+ | |
| 2022 | Alan Tudyk | Dr. Harry Vanderspiegle | Resident Alien | Syfy | |
Best Actor in a Science Fiction/Fantasy Series, Limited Series or Made-for-TV Movie
| 2023 | Adam Scott | Mark Scout | Severance | Apple TV+ | |
| 2023 | Chiwetel Ejiofor | Faraday | The Man Who Fell to Earth | Showtime | |
| 2023 | Samuel L. Jackson | Ptolemy Grey | The Last Days of Ptolemy Gray | Apple TV+ | |
| 2023 | Diego Luna | Cassian Andor | Andor | Disney+ | |
| 2023 | Anson Mount | Christopher Pike | Star Trek: Strange New Worlds | Paramount+ | |
| 2023 | Matt Smith | Prince Daemon Targaryen | House of the Dragon | HBO | |
| 2024 | Jharrel Jerome (TIE) | Cootie | I'm a Virgo | Amazon Prime Video | |
| 2024 | Kurt Russell (TIE) | Lee Shaw | Monarch: Legacy of Monsters | Apple TV+ | |
| 2024 | Ncuti Gatwa | Fifteenth Doctor | Doctor Who: 60th Anniversary Specials | BBC One/Disney+ | |
| 2024 | Anson Mount | Christopher Pike | Star Trek: Strange New Worlds | Paramount+ | |
| 2024 | Todd Stashwick | Captain Liam Shaw | Star Trek: Picard | Paramount+ | |
| 2024 | Patrick Stewart | Jean-Luc Picard | Star Trek: Picard | Paramount+ | |
| 2025 | Diego Luna | Cassian Andor | Andor | Disney+ | |
| 2025 | Ncuti Gatwa | Fifteenth Doctor | Doctor Who | BBC One/Disney+ | |
| 2025 | Walton Goggins | The Ghoul / Cooper Howard | Fallout | Starz | |
| 2025 | Adam Scott | Mark S. / Mark Scout | Severance | Apple TV+ | |
| 2025 | Tramell Tillman | Seth Milchick | Severance | Apple TV+ | |
| 2025 | Julio Torres | Himself | Fantasmas | HBO | |
| 2026 | Sterling K. Brown | Xavier Collins | Paradise | Hulu | |
| 2026 | Dexter Sol Ansell | Prince Aegon "Egg" Targaryen | A Knight of the Seven Kingdoms | HBO | |
| 2026 | Peter Claffey | Ser Duncan "Dunk" the Tall | A Knight of the Seven Kingdoms | HBO | |
| 2026 | Colin Farrell | John Sugar | Sugar | Apple TV | |
| 2026 | Timothy Olyphant | Kirsh | Alien: Earth | FX | |
| 2026 | Matt Smith | Daemon Targaryen | House of the Dragon | HBO | |

== Series with multiple nominations ==
3 nominations

- Severance
- Star Trek: Picard

2 nominations

- Andor
- Doctor Who
- Foundation
- House of the Dragon
- A Knight of the Seven Kingdoms
- Star Trek: Strange New Worlds

== Performers with multiple nominations ==
2 nominations

- Ncuti Gatwa
- Diego Luna
- Anson Mount
- Patrick Stewart
- Adam Scott
- Matt Smith

== See also ==
- Critics' Choice Super Award for Best Science Fiction/Fantasy Series
- Critics' Choice Super Award for Best Actress in a Science Fiction/Fantasy Series
