= Finn Bennett =

British actor (born 1999)

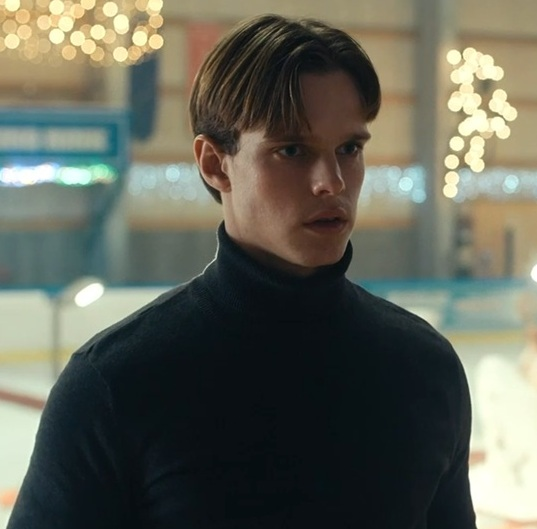
- Bennett in 2024 as Officer Peter Prior in True Detective
- Born: 27 December 1999 (age 26); Homerton, London, England
- Education: Stagecoach Performing Arts
- Occupation: Actor
- Years active: 2010–present
- Parents: Ronan Bennett (father); Georgina Henry (mother)

Finn Bennett (born 27 December 1999) is an Irish-British actor. He is known for his roles in the HBO series True Detective: Night Country (2024), A Knight of the Seven Kingdoms (2026), and Backrooms (2026). He received a Trophée Chopard at the 2025 Cannes Film Festival and was named a Screen International Star of Tomorrow.

== Early life ==
Bennett was born on 27 December 1999 at Homerton University Hospital in Hackney, London, England. He is the son of Ronan Bennett, an Irish novelist and screenwriter, and Georgina Henry (1960–2014), a British journalist. He also has Belgian heritage through his maternal grandmother, Annette Duvivier. Bennett attended school in London, and on Saturdays took drama classes at Stagecoach Performing Arts in Islington. Instead of going on to university, having secured a place at Queen's University Belfast to study anthropology, he had various jobs until booking Domina.

== Career ==
Bennett began his career as a child actor; his television debut was wrongly stated as an episode of the detective drama Foyle's War in 2010, (Note: "The internet would have you believe that Bennett's screen start came five years earlier in WW2 detective drama Foyle's War; however, Bennett would like to correct the record. "That’s not me in Foyle's War," he laughs.") instead he first appeared in a 2013 episode of Top Boy, a series created and written by his father. He appeared in the 2015 BBC One television film adaptation of Laurie Lee's memoir Cider with Rosie. He had a recurring role as Ewen in the first series of Liar in 2017. The following year, he played Simon Warner in the Channel 4 crime drama Kiri and made a guest appearance in an episode of the Sky One comedy-drama Sick of It.

In 2019, Bennett made his feature film debut with a small role in William Nicholson's drama Hope Gap. Bennett returned to television in 2021 when he portrayed Marcellus in the Sky Atlantic series Domina. That same year, he appeared in the horror film A Banquet.

In September 2022, Bennett was cast as Peter Prior on the fourth season of the HBO anthology series True Detective, subtitled Night Country, which premiered on 14 January 2024. He had roles in the Netflix series Black Doves (2024) and in Alex Garland's film Warfare (2025).

On 18 June 2024, it was confirmed that Bennett would join the cast of A Knight of The Seven Kingdoms as Aerion Targaryen. The series premiered on 18 January 2026 in the United States. In July 2025, he was announced to have joined the cast of the A24 science fiction horror film Backrooms. He was also cast in the series Prisoner, released in April 2026.

== Filmography ==
=== Film ===
Year	Title	Role	Notes	Ref.
2019	Hope Gap	Robbie		
2020	Surge	Teenager		
2021	A Banquet	Sean		
2021	The Mouse	Jakub	short-film	
2025	Warfare	John		
2025	Eye for an Eye	Shawn		
2026	Backrooms	Robert "Bobby" Franklin		
2027	Loser	TBA		

=== Television ===
Year	Title	Role	Notes	Ref
2013	Top Boy	Noah	Series 2, episode 1	
2015	Cider with Rosie	Jack	TV film	
2017	Liar	Ewen	4 episodes	
2018	Kiri	Simon Warner	4 episodes	
2018	Sick of It	Dylan	Episode: "The Kid"	
2021	Domina	Marcellus	4 episodes	
2021	The Nevers	Pink Shirt	Episode: "Exposure"	
2024	True Detective: Night Country	Officer Peter Prior	Main role; 6 episodes	
2024	Black Doves	Cole Atwood	Recurring	
2026	A Knight of the Seven Kingdoms	Prince Aerion "Brightflame" Targaryen	Recurring role; 5 episodes	
2026	Prisoner	Olly Hatton	Recurring	

== Awards and nominations ==
Year	Association	Category	Work	Result	Ref.
2024	Astra TV Awards	Best Supporting Actor in a Limited Series or TV Movie	True Detective: Night Country	Nominated	
2025	British Independent Film Awards	Best Ensemble Performance	Warfare	Won (Note: Shared with D'Pharaoh Woon-A-Tai, Will Poulter, Cosmo Jarvis, Kit Connor, Joseph Quinn, and Charles Melton.)	
2025	Cannes Film Festival	Trophée Chopard	—N/a	Won	
2025	Screen International	Star of Tomorrow	—N/a	Won (Note: Shared with Peter Claffey, Owen Cooper, Jade Croot, Izuka Hoyle, Emma Laird, Bella Maclean, Kieron Moore, Tut Nyuot, Daniel Quinn-Toye and Sadie Soverall.)	
