= Primetime Emmy Award for Outstanding Stunts =

Primetime Emmy Award for Outstanding Stunts may refer to:

- Primetime Emmy Award for Outstanding Stunt Coordination
- Primetime Emmy Award for Outstanding Stunt Performance
