= 500 Miles (film) =

British drama film

- Theatrical release poster
- Directed by: Morgan Matthews
- Screenplay by: Malcolm Campbell
- Based on: Charlie and Me by Mark Lowery
- Produced by: David M. Thompson; Martina Niland; Alex Gordon; Keren Misgav Ristvedt
- Starring: Bill Nighy; Roman Griffin Davis; Dexter Sol Ansell; Maisie Williams
- Production companies: Origin Pictures; Minnow Film; Port Pictures
- Distributed by: True Brit Entertainment (United Kingdom); Beach Pictures (Ireland)
- Release dates: 27 February 2026 (DIFF); 15 May 2026 (Ireland); 26 June 2026 (United Kingdom)
- Running time: 101 minutes
- Countries: United Kingdom; Ireland
- Language: English
- Box office: $88,984

500 Miles is a 2026 drama film directed by Morgan Matthews and starring Bill Nighy, Dexter Sol Ansell and Roman Griffin Davis. The script is adapted by Malcolm Campbell from the novel Charlie and Me by Mark Lowery.

It premiered at the Dublin International Film Festival on 27 February 2026.

== Premise ==
A grandfather on the west coast of Ireland is estranged from his grandchildren, Charlie and Finn, before they take it upon themselves to visit him.

== Cast ==
Actor	Role
Bill Nighy	John, Finn and Charlie's estranged grandfather
Roman Griffin Davis	Finn, older brother to Charlie
Dexter Sol Ansell	Charlie, younger brother to Finn
Maisie Williams	Kait
Clare Dunne	Julie (Mother)
Michael Socha	Dan (Father)
Loré Adewusi	Tomo

== Production ==
The film was announced in February 2024 as an Origin Pictures, Port Pictures and Minnow Films project. It is an adaptation of the Mark Lowery novel Charlie and Me and is directed by Morgan Matthews with the script by Malcolm Campbell. It has David M. Thompson producing with Alex Gordon and Keren Misgav Ristvedt for Origin Pictures, Martina Niland from Dublin-based Port Pictures.

Bill Nighy and Roman Griffin Davis were announced in the cast in February 2024. In May 2024, Maisie Williams joined the cast. In October 2024, Dexter Sol Ansell, Michael Socha and Clare Dunne joined the cast.

Principal photography began in the Republic of Ireland in October 2024.

== Release ==
In February 2024, True Brit Entertainment acquired the distribution rights to the film in the United Kingdom. The film had its world premiere at the Dublin International Film Festival on 27 February 2026. It was released theatrically in Ireland on 15 May, by Beach Pictures, and was released in the United Kingdom on 26 June.
