= Owen Harris (director) =

British TV, film director

- Born: 1972 (age 53–54); London, England
- Occupations: Director, producer

Owen Harris is a British television and film director and producer.

== Career ==
He has directed episodes of Secret Diary of a Call Girl and Misfits, and the TV movies Holy Flying Circus and The Gamechangers. In 2013, he directed "Be Right Back", an episode of the anthology series Black Mirror, and in 2016 he directed another episode, "San Junipero".

In 2015 he made his feature film debut as a director with the film Kill Your Friends. In 2018, Harris directed episodes of the BBC/Netflix miniseries Troy: Fall of a City.

He is a prominent director and executive producer for HBO's A Knight of the Seven Kingdoms, having directed the first, second, and fifth episodes of the first season. His direction of the "Trial of the Seven" sequence in episode 5 was heavily praised.

== Filmography ==
Film

- Kill Your Friends (2015)

Television

Year	Title	Notes
2010	Secret Diary of a Call Girl	4 episodes
2010	Misfits	3 episodes
2011	Holy Flying Circus	TV movie
2013–2019	Black Mirror	Episodes "Be Right Back", "San Junipero", "Striking Vipers"
2015	The Gamechangers	Docudrama
2018	Troy: Fall of a City	3 episodes
2019	The Twilight Zone	Episode "The Comedian"
2020	Brave New World	Episodes "Pilot" and "Want and Consequence"; Also executive producer
2023	Mrs. Davis	4 episodes
2026	A Knight of the Seven Kingdoms	3 episodes
