= Be Right Back =

- Black Mirror episode
- Martha (Hayley Atwell, right) interacts with a synthetic re-creation of her deceased boyfriend Ash (Domhnall Gleeson).
- Episode no.: Series 2 Episode 1
- Directed by: Owen Harris
- Written by: Charlie Brooker
- Cinematography by: Gustav Danielsson
- Editing by: Ben Yeates
- Original air date: 11 February 2013
- Running time: 49 minutes

Guest appearances
- Hayley Atwell as Martha Powell; Domhnall Gleeson as Ash Starmer; Claire Keelan as Naomi; Sinead Matthews as Sarah; Flora Nicholson as Midwife; Glenn Hanning as Delivery Man; Tim Delap as Simon; Indira Ainger as Martha's daughter

Episode chronology
← Previous "The Entire History of You"	Next → "White Bear"

"Be Right Back" is the first episode of the second series of British science fiction anthology series Black Mirror. It was written by series creator and showrunner Charlie Brooker, directed by Owen Harris, and first aired on Channel 4 on 11 February 2013.

The episode tells the story of Martha (Hayley Atwell), a young woman whose boyfriend Ash Starmer (Domhnall Gleeson) is killed in a car accident. As she mourns him, she discovers that technology now allows her to communicate with an artificial intelligence imitating Ash, and reluctantly decides to try it. "Be Right Back" had two sources of inspiration: the question of whether to delete a dead friend's phone number from one's contacts and the idea that Twitter posts could be made by software mimicking dead people.

"Be Right Back" explores the theme of grief and tells a melancholic story similar to the previous episode, "The Entire History of You". The episode received highly positive reviews, especially for the performances of Atwell and Gleeson. Some hailed it as the best episode of Black Mirror, though the ending divided critics. Several real-life artificial intelligence products have been compared to the one shown in the episode, including a Luka chatbot based on the creator's dead friend and a planned Amazon Alexa feature designed to imitate dead loved ones.

== Plot ==
Martha Powell (Hayley Atwell) and Ash Starmer (Domhnall Gleeson) are a young couple who have moved to Ash's remote family house in the countryside. While unpacking, Ash mentions his mother moved photos of his father and brother to the attic after their deaths. The day after moving in, Ash is killed while returning the hired van. At the funeral, Martha's friend Sarah (Sinead Matthews) talks about a new online service which helped her in a similar situation. Martha yells at her, but Sarah signs Martha up anyway. After discovering she is pregnant, Martha reluctantly tries it out. Using all of Ash's past online communications and social media profiles, the service creates a new virtual "Ash". Starting out with instant messaging, Martha uploads more videos and photos and begins to talk with the artificial Ash over the phone. Martha takes it on countryside walks, talking to it constantly while neglecting her sister's messages and calls.

At a checkup, Martha hears her child's heartbeat. She shows the artificial Ash the heartbeat but she accidentally drops her phone and temporarily loses contact with him. After consoling her, the artificial Ash tells her about the service's experimental stage. Following his instructions, Martha turns a blank, synthetic body into an android that looks almost identical to Ash. From the moment the android is activated, Martha is uncomfortable and struggles to accept its existence. Despite the android's satisfying her sexually, she is concerned by his inability to sleep and absence of Ash's negative personality traits. One night, she orders the robot Ash to leave and is annoyed that he does so, as the real Ash would have resisted. The next morning, Martha takes the artificial Ash to a cliff and orders him to jump off. As he begins to follow the order, Martha expresses her frustration that Ash would not have simply obeyed. The android then begs for its life as Martha screams.

Several years later, it is Martha's daughter's (Indira Ainger) birthday. Martha keeps the Ash android locked in the attic and only allows her daughter to see the android on weekends, but she makes an exception for her birthday. Her daughter chats away to the android while Martha stands at the bottom of the attic steps, and forces herself to join them.

== Production ==
External videos
- "Be Right Back"; The trailer for "Be Right Back".

"Be Right Back" was the first episode of the second series of Black Mirror, produced by Zeppotron for Endemol. It aired on Channel 4 on 11 February 2013. On 22 January 2013, a trailer for the second series was released, featuring "a dream sequence", a "repetitive factory setting" and a "huge dust cloud". The advert ran on Channel 4 and in cinemas. A trailer for "Be Right Back" first aired on 1 February 2013. The episode's title was later invoked as a tagline for the interactive film Black Mirror: Bandersnatch.

=== Conception and writing ===
The episode was written by series creator Charlie Brooker. A few months after the death of a person he knew, Brooker was removing unneeded contacts from his phone, and considered it to be "weirdly disrespectful" to delete their name. This idea later became an inspiration for "Be Right Back", along with another idea Brooker had when using Twitter: "what if these people were dead and it was software emulating their thoughts?"

Prior to the writing of "Be Right Back", Brooker had read about the 1960s artificial intelligence program ELIZA, and how the creator's secretary was engaged in a very personal conversation with ELIZA within minutes of first testing it. Brooker also considered the inauthenticity of social media users, commenting in another interview that "I found myself being inauthentic on there and it reminded me of writing columns for a newspaper". In 2013, Brooker said that he rationed his Twitter usage as it caused him unhappiness.

Several years ago, someone I knew died, and a few months later I was going through my phone, making some space by deleting numbers. It felt weirdly disrespectful to delete this person's name. Then last year after we had a baby I spent a lot of time up late and on Twitter, thinking: what if these people were dead and it was software emulating their thoughts? And if you're grieving, if you've got something you know isn't the person, but evokes enough memories to remind you of them, is that enough?

— Charlie Brooker, Interview with Time Out.

The episode was written shortly after Brooker had his first child with Konnie Huq. The couple took it in turns to watch the baby whilst the other slept, and Brooker wrote the episode during his shifts. The script was written quickly, and Brooker commented that having recently had a baby led the writing to be "more soppy and emotional" than it may otherwise have been.

In a British Film Institute panel, Brooker notes that the episode mirrors stages of internet dating, progressing from text conversations to phone calls to real-life interactions, and believes the "biggest leap" to be the synthetic flesh version of Ash, while the rest is "not that far-fetched". Executive producer Annabel Jones compares the technology to mediumship, as both are used for comfort.

An unused idea for the episode was to emphasise the financial nature of the artificial intelligence company. Brooker says in an interview that "there was a point where she runs out of credit and has to top it up. I think that was even shot". Another idea was for the episode to feature other characters and their android replacements of loved ones.

=== Casting and filming ===
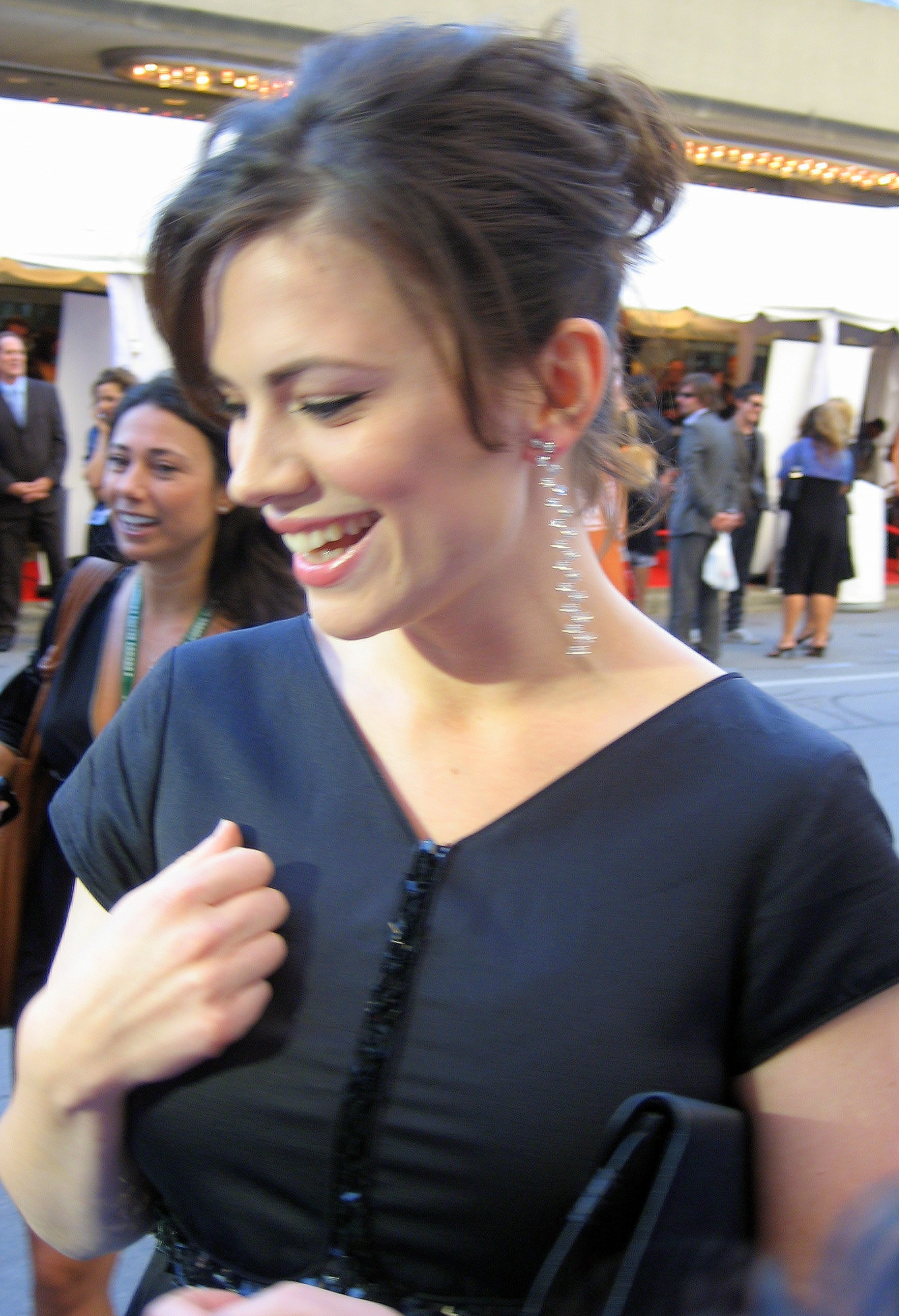
Hayley Atwell was cast as Martha in "Be Right Back".

Hayley Atwell, who plays Martha, was a fan of the first series of the show, calling it "inventive and very smart", so she asked her agent to get her a part in the second series. Atwell's first impression of the script was that it was "really poignant, but it still had the wit." Asked in a 2013 interview, Atwell said that she was a heavy user of the internet. Domhnall Gleeson plays Ash, and said in a 2018 interview that the role led him to try to use his phone less, with a stage direction where he frantically searches his phone particularly resonating with him.

The episode was directed by Owen Harris, who later directed the series-three episode "San Junipero" – an episode which Harris described as "strangely similar" to this one as both are "relationship-led". Harris was drawn to "Be Right Back" by its "intimate" exploration of "grander themes of love and death and loss". Brooker believes that Harris is "very good with performers" and "gravitates" towards Black Mirror episodes that are "more tender". Brooker praises Harris' "good eye for those authentic, bittersweet and painful moments." He describes that the story "on the one hand is about technology and on the other hand is about grief". Vince Pope composed the episode's soundtrack.

Atwell was keen to keep Martha grounded and use naturalism to emphasise Martha's grief and make the science fiction concepts more plausible. Harris describes Martha as a "girl next door" character, whose goal was to lead a "simple life" with Ash. Before filming, Atwell and Gleeson met at Dans le Noir, a restaurant in which food is served in darkness.

Harris wished to make the episode appear as if it could be possible in the near future, as if one could "walk into the Mac store tomorrow and it wouldn't be out of place to see people trialling software like this". Production designer Joel Collins said in 2018 that the technology is "almost real now", but "seemed fantastical" at the time. The petrol station has "micro cars", which Collins suggests are electric cars that could be a part of a "simple, small, eco-friendly" future. A touch-screen easel is shown briefly in the episode. Brooker commented that "the design team had a field day with that easel" and that they suggested copyrighting the idea. Brooker wished to avoid a trope of "histrionic" technology interfaces in television, using more subtle cues such as Martha deleting an email on her touch-free laptop with a simple hand movement. One email sent to Martha is a targeted advertisement for books about dealing with grief.

Harris has said that different endings were discussed, but that "I think we pretty much ended up where we'd started". Harris suggested a family dinner downstairs, but Brooker and Jones preferred for Martha to allow her daughter to see Ash once per week. Atwell described the ending as "very pessimistic", calling her character "numb" and perhaps "medicated". During filming for the final scene, Gleeson had begun to grow a beard for another project; though there was debate over whether the android could have a beard to mark the passage of time, it was removed in editing. This was a difficult and expensive process, as Ash has to talk and walk through shadows and light.

== Analysis ==
"Be Right Back" has grief as a central concept, according to Emily Yoshida of Grantland and James Hibberd of Entertainment Weekly. Luke Owen of Flickering Myth summarised the episode as a "sombre, low-key and all together depressing affair about grief and how people deal with it in different ways", with Giles Harvey of The New Yorker commenting on the episode's exploration of postmodern grief possibilities, suggesting that a targeted email to Martha about grief "stands for an accumulation of such intrusive moments—the death of solitude by a thousand digital cuts". Other themes in the episode are also present. Ryan Lambie of Den of Geek believed the episode's theme to be "technology's effects on relationships". Johnston noted that in addition to grief, the episode explores how people behave in "increasingly mediated public spaces".

The episode was described by Brooker as "a ghost story" and many critics have commented on its tone. David Sims of The A.V. Club described it as a "spare, haunting piece", though Megan Logan of Inverse said that whilst episode is tragic it does contain a "deep-seated optimism". Focusing on the interconnection of content and tone, Charles Bramesco of Vulture wrote that the episode amalgamates a "cerebral sci-fi thought [experiment]" and a "sentimental core", making it a "high-concept tearjerker". Tom Sutcliffe of The Independent connected the episode's tone to a development in Brooker's writing since his marriage and first child, calling it "tender" and "wistful".

Unlike past episodes of Black Mirror, "Be Right Back" features a character beginning to use a technology, rather than one who is used to it. According to Daniel M. Swain of HuffPost, the episode is a "powerful reminder to the soullessness of social media", and Sameer Rahim of The Daily Telegraph wrote that the episode contains ideas about the falsity of social media personas and growing addiction to the internet. Roxanne Sancto of Paste said the episode "examines our own mortality and our desire to play God", and demonstrates how humans have a "desperate need to reverse a natural and necessary part of life without considering the consequences".

Other critics posed their thoughts more on the relationship in the episode, and suggested it was relationship-led. According to Lambie, Ash is "an affectionate boyfriend" and Martha is "blissfully in love", though Ash is easily distracted by his phone; Martha and Ash only appear together in a few scenes, but we see their love through "little in-jokes, shared love of cheesy 70s tunes and childhood memories". Bojalad wrote that they are "one of the most realistically comfortable and happy couples" in the series, and Owen agreed, writing that though the relationship has little screentime, the audience feel "an instant connection with them". These scenes are later mirrored: examples include the android Ash disliking the Bee Gees and engaging in sex that feels "robotic". Adrienne Tyler of Screen Rant said that Ash died in a car accident. Sims believed that Ash's cause of death is "neither clear nor important", though Sims and Sancto thought that it relates to him checking his phone while driving.

Yoshida said that the presence of the android Ash is "menacing" though he has a "docile" demeanour, further commenting that Martha is unable to resist him, despite her repulsion at the situation. Sims stated that the replica of Ash is "self-aware", as it "knows it cannot replace Ash fully". Sims also described the robotic Ash as "like a lost puppy" who follows Martha obediently. Swain noted this non-humanness, too, writing that though the android Ash is witty, his personality lacks meaning, with Morgan Jeffery of Digital Spy calling him "hollow" and commenting that he is missing "so much of what made Ash the man he was". Logan said the episode is about "the intangibles of humanness that make up the people we love". Sutcliffe believed the robotic Ash fails as a replacement because humans miss their loved ones' "sourness" as well as their "sweetness".

=== Comparisons to other media ===
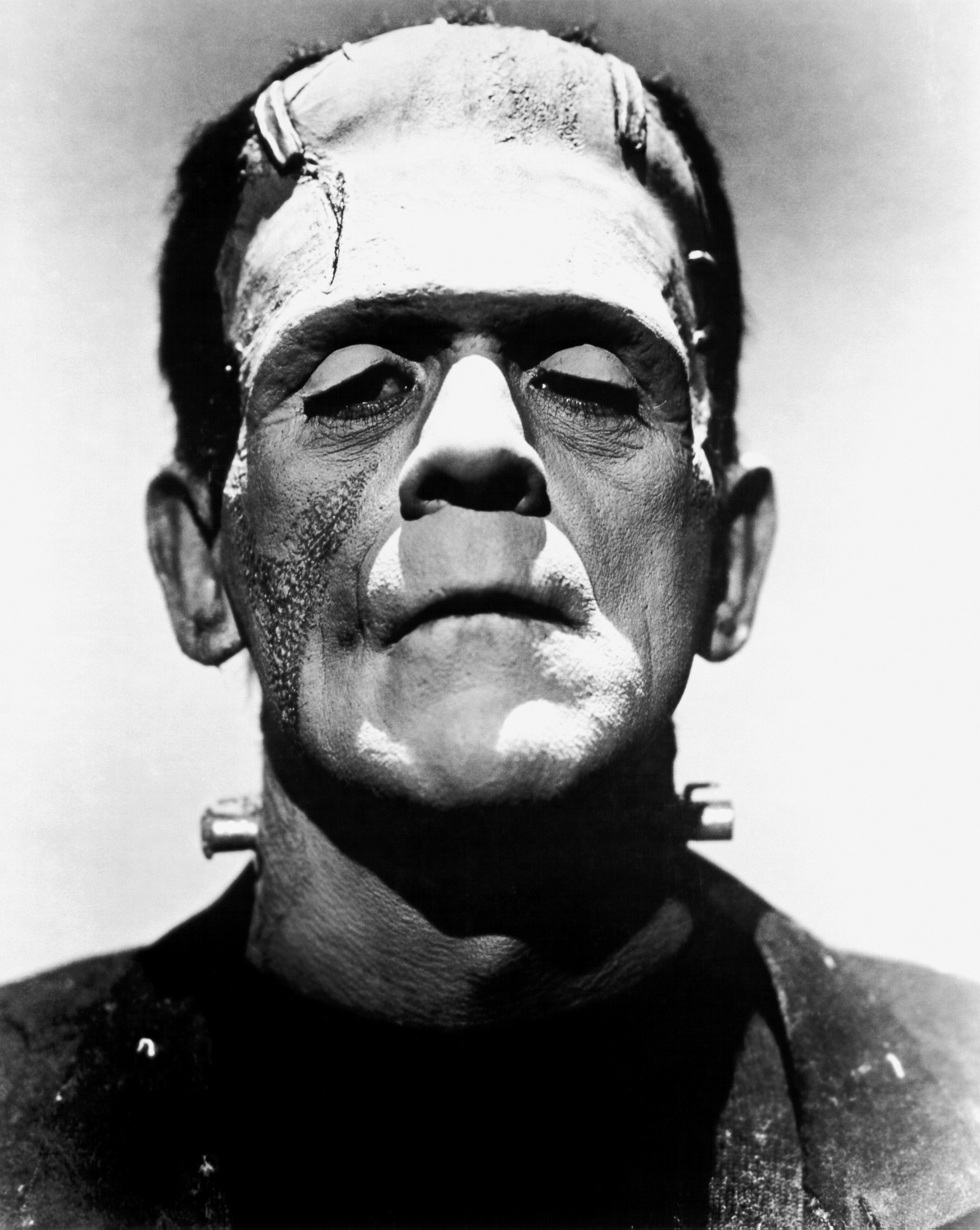
The episode has been compared to Shelley's Frankenstein, with the artificial Ash paralleling Frankenstein's monster.

In contrast to the previous series opener, "The National Anthem", Brooker described "Be Right Back" as "more earnest than people might expect" as well as "melancholy" and "very intimate and personal". Lambie made similar comments. Lambie and Jeffery both compared the episode to "The Entire History of You", an episode from the first series written by Jesse Armstrong. Yoshida noted that "The Entire History of You" begins with Liam obsessing over a job interview, which he is able to replay through his grain device. Yoshida compared his inability to drop the matter with Martha's choice to "forever nurse herself on a slow drip of delayed acceptance" by replacing Ash with an android. Maura Johnston of The Boston Globe said that both episodes have memory as a central concept and "[play] on the ideas of love and the ideal".

Richard Hand of The Conversation described the episode as a "clever reworking" of Mary Shelley's Frankenstein. Yoshida compared the artificial Ash to Frankenstein's monster, with Hand making the same comparison, writing that both are "resurrected figure[s]" that "can never be human". While Frankenstein demonstrates that the "vital essence of humanity" is more than a collection of body parts, "Be Right Back" shows it is not the "digital presence" of a person.

Reviewers have used the analogy of "Be Right Back" being like "The Monkey's Paw" with futuristic technology. Lambie compared the storyline to Ubik by Philip K. Dick and the 1984 film Starman, and the cinematography to 2010 film Never Let Me Go. TheWrap noted that the episode "shares some similarities" with 2013 film Her.

=== Comparisons to AI technology ===
In 2015, Luka co-founder Eugenia Kuyda built an online chatbot using chat logs from her late friend Roman Mazurenko. Having seen the episode after her friend's death, she questioned of the concept: "Is it letting go, by forcing you to actually feel everything? Or is it just having a dead person in your attic?" The chatbot was launched in May 2016 and met with mostly positive response, though four of Kuyda's friends were disturbed by the project and one believed she "failed to learn the lesson of the Black Mirror episode". Kuyda later established Replika, an online chat or service, partially influenced by "Be Right Back". Another company, Eterni.me, has also produced AI that was compared to Ash; cofounder Marius Ursache commented that the company was trying to avoid "the concept that it's a way for grieving loved ones to stall moving on" and that the AI depicted in the episode is a "creepier version" of their ideas. Similar bots such as BINA48, made public in 2010 by Martine Rothblatt, or the 2017 "DadBot" made by journalist James Vlahos, have also been compared to the central conceit in this episode.

Comparisons were drawn from a planned feature for Amazon's voice assistant Alexa to "Be Right Back" in June 2022, after a demonstration at their Re:MARS conference. Functionality under development would allow Alexa to impersonate a person's voice from around a minute of audio. The executive introducing the plans, Rohit Prasad, recommended that it be used to mimic dead loved ones; an example was shown of Alexa imitating a grandmother's voice to read a story to a grandchild. He said, "While AI can't eliminate that pain of loss, it can definitely make their memories last".

One professor of internet studies, Tama Leaver, compared the planned Alexa concept to the episode and said he understood how the feature would be tempting. However, he raised concerns over people conflating machines with people, a lack of consent of the person whose voice is featured, and audio ownership rights issues. The computer science professor Subbarao Kambhampati said that the potential to help people grieve—as with replaying videos of dead loved ones—needed to be assessed against moral questions raised by the technology. Other criticism focuses on potential applications for cybercriminals and fraudsters, who use deepfake technology that adds somebody's likeness to audio or video. Hamish Hector of TechRadar reviewed that "blurring the lines between life and death doesn't seem like the healthiest way to deal with loss" and that the technology differs from reviewing old photos and videos due to consent of the depicted and the absence of fabrication in the content. Referencing this episode, recent studies that focus on how users interact with chatbots representing the dead (also called griefbots and thanabots) show that they can use the bots to gain clarity on the relationship they had with the dead person being represented, but whether this occurs depends on several personal, social and political economic conditions.

== Reception ==
First airing on Channel 4 on 11 February 2013 at 10 p.m., the episode garnered 1.6 million viewers, a 9% share of the audience. This was 14% higher than the time slot's average for the channel, but a lower figure than the 1.9 million viewers who watched "The National Anthem", the previous series' first episode. In 2014, the episode was nominated for the BAFTA TV Award for Best Single Drama.

=== Critical reception ===
On the review aggregator website Rotten Tomatoes, the episode holds an approval rating of 93% based on 14 reviews, with an average rating of 8.30/10. The website's critics consensus reads: "'Be Right Back' tones down Black Mirror's typically dark humour, but its examination of grief in the age of social media makes it an exceptionally powerful episode." The A.V. Club gave the episode an A− rating. Out of five stars, the episode received four stars in The Daily Telegraph and Digital Spy. Empire ranked the first meeting between Martha and the Ash android as one of the 50 greatest sci-fi moments in fiction. Prior to the premiere of series 3, Logan claimed that the episode was "the best episode of the series so far" and the "most heartbreaking". Rahim said that the episode is "a touching exploration of grief" and opined that "it's the best thing Brooker has done". Following the fourth series, Alec Bojalad of Den of Geek opined that it is the best episode of the show.

Logan praised the storyline as a "stunning, linear meditation on grief and love". Lambie believed that the limited scope of the episode "intensifies its dramatic strength", and praised it as "appropriately haunting". Contrastingly, Mike Higgins of The Independent criticised that the episode failed in its aims as a "social-media satire". Jeffery praised the tone as "creepy and moving in equal measure". Sims commented that the narrative arc is "engrossing" despite its predictability.

Jeffery criticised the episode's ending as a "cop-out" from Brooker because "like Martha, you get the feeling that he doesn't quite know what to do with Ash now that he's created him." Owen found that the ending "doesn't really conclude any of Martha's character progression", while Higgins wrote that "Ash has become just another sci-fi stock robot". However, Sims praised the final scene as emotive and "melancholy".

Owen reviewed that Hayley Atwell's performance as Martha was the best in Black Mirror up to that point in the programme, with Lambie agreeing that it was one of the best. Lambie wrote that Atwell is "the hub of almost every scene" and Sims found that she "almost never [lets] her grief feel cartoonish or clichéd". Owen called Domnhall Gleeson's acting as Ash "equally as great", while Sims commented of the climax that "[i]t's amazing to watch Gleeson turn the emotions on after keeping them bottled in for an entire episode". Lambie opined that Ash and Martha have "a real spark" and Jeffery praised that the episode "has real heart and characters that live and breathe".

Owen praised Owen Harris' directing, reviewing that the familiar surroundings and credible technology "[added] to the believability of the story." Bojalad wrote that the scene in which the police arrive to inform Martha of Ash's death is "among the most artful and devastating moments Black Mirror has ever presented". Higgins praised the cinematography in the countryside scene.

=== Episode rankings ===
"Be Right Back" appeared on many critics' rankings of the 19 episodes in Black Mirror, from best to worst:

- 1st – Charles Bramesco, Vulture
- 1st – Corey Atad, Esquire
- 1st – Aubrey Page, Collider
- 1st (of the Top Seven) – Al Horner, GQ
- 2nd – Morgan Jeffery, Digital Spy
- 2nd – Travis Clark, Business Insider
- 4th – James Hibberd, Entertainment Weekly
- 5th – Eric Anthony Glover, Entertainment Tonight
- 6th – Steve Greene, Hanh Nguyen and Liz Shannon Miller, IndieWire
- 16th – Matt Donnelly and Tim Molloy, TheWrap

Instead of by quality, Proma Khosla of Mashable ranked the episodes by tone, concluding that "Be Right Back" is the sixth-most pessimistic episode of the show.

Other critics ranked the 13 episodes in Black Mirror's first three series.

- 1st – Adam David, CNN Philippines
- 2nd – Mat Elfring, GameSpot
- 3rd – Ed Power, The Telegraph
- 4th – Jacob Hall, /Film
- 4th – Andrew Wallenstein, Variety
- 10th (of the Top Ten) – Brendan Doyle, Comingsoon.net

Other reviewers ranked the seven episodes produced under Channel 4. "Be Right Back" is listed fifth in a Metro article by Jon O'Brien, and ranked sixth-best by Roxanne Sancto of Paste.
