= A Knight of the Seven Kingdoms (TV series) =

2026 American fantasy series

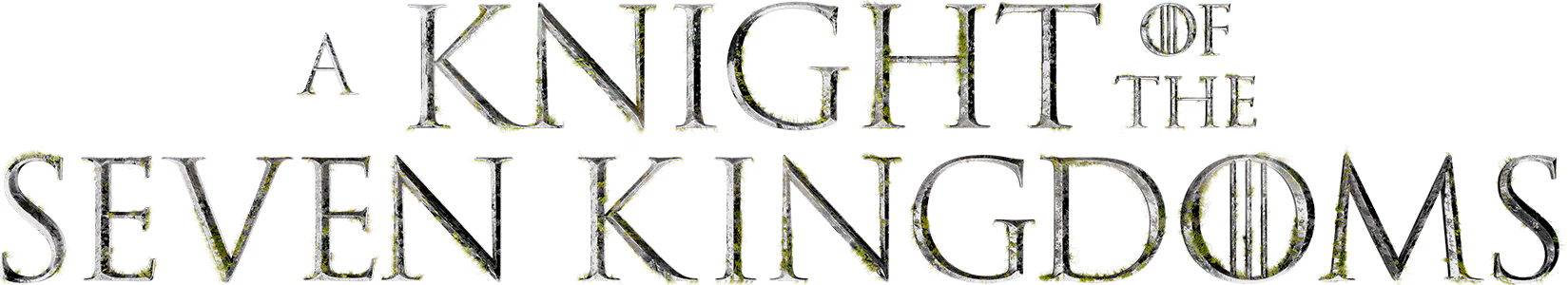
- Genre: Fantasy drama; Comedy-drama
- Created by: Ira Parker; George R. R. Martin
- Based on: Tales of Dunk and Egg by George R. R. Martin
- Showrunner: Ira Parker
- Starring: Peter Claffey; Dexter Sol Ansell
- Composer: Dan Romer
- Country of origin: United States
- Original language: English
- No. of seasons: 1
- No. of episodes: 6

Production
- Executive producers: Ira Parker; George R. R. Martin; Sarah Bradshaw; Ryan Condal; Owen Harris; Vince Gerardis
- Producer: Lisa Byrne
- Production location: United Kingdom
- Running time: 30–42 minutes
- Production companies: Friendly Wolf Pictures; GRRM; HBO Entertainment

Original release
- Network: HBO
- Release: January 18, 2026 – present

Related
- Game of Thrones franchise

A Knight of the Seven Kingdoms is an American fantasy drama television series created by Ira Parker and George R. R. Martin. A prequel to Game of Thrones (2011–2019), it is the third television series in the Game of Thrones franchise and is an adaptation of the Tales of Dunk and Egg series of novellas, beginning with The Hedge Knight. It stars Peter Claffey as Ser Duncan "Dunk" the Tall, the titular hedge knight, and Dexter Sol Ansell as his squire, Aegon "Egg" Targaryen.

The series premiered on January 18, 2026, on HBO and received positive reviews from critics. In November 2025, ahead of the first-season premiere, the series was renewed for a second season, which will be based on The Sworn Sword and is expected to be released in 2027. At the 78th Primetime Emmy Awards, the first season received nominations for nine awards, including Outstanding Drama Series.

== Cast and characters ==
=== Main ===
- Peter Claffey as Ser Duncan "Dunk" the Tall, a lowborn hedge knight
  - Bamber Todd portrays young Dunk
- Dexter Sol Ansell as Prince Aegon "Egg" Targaryen, a child whom Dunk takes as his squire

=== Recurring and guest ===
- Daniel Ings as Ser Lyonel Baratheon, a knight known as the "Laughing Storm" and the heir to House Baratheon of Storm's End
- Shaun Thomas as Raymun Fossoway, Steffon's cousin and squire
- Tanzyn Crawford as Tanselle, a Dornish puppeteer
- Danny Webb as Ser Arlan of Pennytree, an old hedge knight and Dunk's mentor
- Henry Ashton as Prince Daeron "The Drunken" Targaryen, Egg's eldest brother
- Daniel Monks as Ser Manfred Dondarrion, a knight of House Dondarrion of Blackhaven
- Tom Vaughan-Lawlor as Plummer, the steward of Ashford
- Carla Harrison-Hodge as Beony, a prostitute in Manfred's service
- Rowan Robinson as Red, a prostitute in Manfred's service
- Edward Ashley as Ser Steffon Fossoway, a knight of House Fossoway of Cider Hall
- Danny Collins as Ser Humfrey Beesbury, a knight of House Beesbury of Honeyholt
- Ross Anderson as Ser Humfrey Hardyng, a knight of House Hardyng
- Bertie Carvel as Prince Baelor "Breakspear" Targaryen, Prince of Dragonstone, Hand of the King and Protector of the Realm, eldest son of King Daeron II Targaryen, heir to the Iron Throne, and Egg's uncle
- Sam Spruell as Prince Maekar "The Anvil" Targaryen, Prince of Summerhall, Baelor's younger brother, and the father of Daeron, Aerion, and Egg
- Finn Bennett as Prince Aerion "Brightflame" Targaryen, Egg's older brother
- Youssef Kerkour as Steely Pate, a blacksmith hailing from the Reach
- Steve Wall as Lord Leo "Longthorn" Tyrell, lord of Highgarden and head of House Tyrell
- Paul Hunter as Lord Ashford, lord of Ashford and head of House Ashford, who hosts a tournament to celebrate his daughter's name day
- Cara Harris as Lady Gwin Ashford, the young daughter of Lord Ashford
- Oscar Morgan as Prince Valarr Targaryen, Baelor's son
- Wade Briggs as Ser Roland Crakehall, a member of Daeron II's Kingsguard
- Bill Ward as Ser Donnel of Duskendale, a member of Daeron II's Kingsguard
- Russell Simpson as Lord Medgar Tully, lord of Riverrun and head of House Tully
- William Houston as Ser Robyn Rhysling, a one-eyed knight of House Rhysling
- Chloe Lea as Rafe, Dunk's childhood friend
- Edward Davis as Alester, a member of the City Watch of King's Landing

== Episodes ==
No.	Title	Directed by	Written by	Original release date	U.S. viewers (millions)
1	"The Hedge Knight"	Owen Harris	Ira Parker	January 18, 2026	N/A
Dunk buries his deceased mentor, Ser Arlan of Pennytree. Taking Arlan's sword, shield, and three horses, Dunk travels to a tournament being held in Ashford. At an inn, a belligerent drunk noble says he dreamed of Dunk. A bald child that Dunk believes is the stable boy asks to be his squire for the tournament, but Dunk refuses. Dunk meets Plummer, Ashford's steward, and requests to enter the tournament by claiming that Arlan knighted him before dying. Plummer says someone must vouch for him. Dunk seeks out Ser Manfred Dondarrion, whose father Arlan served. Two prostitutes, Beony and Red, mock Dunk for his ragged appearance and claim Manfred is unavailable, before sympathizing with him. Dunk meets Ser Steffon Fossoway and befriends his squire, Raymun Fossoway, before watching a puppet show featuring a fire-breathing dragon puppet performed by Tanselle. Raymun takes Dunk to Ser Lyonel Baratheon's feast, where Dunk befriends Lyonel, who doubts his tournament chances. Dunk finds Manfred, who refuses to vouch for him. At his campsite, Dunk re-encounters the bald child, who calls himself Egg. Dunk names himself Ser Duncan the Tall and makes Egg his squire. They see a shooting star, which Egg claims will bring good luck.
2	"Hard Salt Beef"	Owen Harris	Aziza Barnes & Ira Parker	January 25, 2026	N/A
Dunk eulogizes Arlan to numerous participants at the tournament, including Lord Leo Tyrell, though none remembers Arlan serving them. Dunk witnesses the Targaryen princes Baelor, Maekar, and Aerion arriving. The Kingsguard Ser Roland Crakehall and Ser Donnel of Duskendale jest with Dunk about knighthood. Dunk sneaks into Ashford's castle and overhears that two of Maekar's sons, Daeron and Aegon, are missing. He asks the Targaryens to vouch for him. Baelor remembers Arlan and vouches for Dunk, but advises he create his own coat of arms. Dunk and Egg watch Tanselle perform. Infatuated, Dunk asks Tanselle if she will paint a new coat of arms on his shield. Lyonel drafts Dunk and Egg to help in a tug-of-war game, which they win. Dunk sells his favorite horse Sweetfoot to buy new armor from blacksmith Steely Pate. Dunk and Egg watch the tournament's first jousting matches, which include Prince Valarr Targaryen and Lord Medgar Tully among the participants. Dunk realizes Arlan has no legacy because he achieved little in life, leaving Dunk despondent that he may end up the same.
3	"The Squire"	Sarah Adina Smith	Hiram Martinez & Annie Julia Wyman and Ira Parker	February 1, 2026	0.472
While Dunk sleeps, Egg trains the warhorse, Thunder. He is confronted by Ser Robyn Rhysling, who questions if the horse was stolen. Egg tells Dunk that only highborn knights compete on the tournament's first day. While Dunk buys food, Tanselle says his shield will be ready that evening. Egg requests to permanently squire for Dunk, but Plummer interrupts them. He privately asks Dunk to participate in a rigged joust against Ser Androw Ashford to recoup money spent on hosting the costly tournament. Dunk is baffled by the proposal. During a jousting match, Aerion acts dishonorably and mortally wounds Ser Humfrey Hardyng's horse, enraging the crowd. A fortune teller predicts that Dunk will know great success, whereas Egg will become king and die in flames. Dunk and Raymun discuss Aerion's jousting match, and Raymun expresses his disdain for the Targaryens, saying the dragons are all dead. Egg watches Tanselle's performance of a dragon being slain. Feeling his family was insulted, Aerion breaks Tanselle's finger. Egg fetches Dunk, who becomes infuriated and attacks the prince. Guards quickly restrain Dunk as Aerion prepares to take revenge, but Egg orders them to stop and reveals that he and Aerion are brothers.
4	"Seven"	Sarah Adina Smith	Aziza Barnes & Annie Julia Wyman and Ira Parker	February 8, 2026 (Note: The fourth episode was released early on HBO Max on February 6, 2026, due to Super Bowl LX.)	0.212
Egg tells an imprisoned Dunk that his real name is Aegon Targaryen. He hid his identity to become a squire after his brother, Daeron, the belligerent drunk noble from the inn, refused to participate in the tournament. Baelor informs Dunk that Daeron has accused Dunk of kidnapping Egg. Dunk requests a trial by combat, but Aerion demands a trial by seven. Dunk must find six knights to fight beside him in a seven-versus-seven joust at dawn. Steffon agrees to fight for Dunk, and Egg says that Daeron, Maekar, and three Kingsguard will fight for Aerion. Daeron apologizes to Dunk and promises to intentionally fall from his horse. He privately tells Dunk about a prophetic dream of seeing Dunk with a dead dragon. Pate informs Dunk that Tanselle has fled Ashford and returned to Dorne, then gives him his shield and armor. As dawn breaks, Egg brings Lyonel, Robyn, Hardyng, and Ser Humfrey Beesbury to fight for Dunk, but Steffon switches sides after Aerion promised him a lordship. Lyonel knights Raymun to replace Steffon. Still one knight short, Dunk appeals to the crowd's honor. Baelor declares that he will fight for Dunk.
5	"In the Name of the Mother"	Owen Harris	Hiram Martinez & Ti Mikkel and Ira Parker	February 15, 2026	0.592
The trial of seven begins. In the first charge, Aerion knocks Dunk off his horse. In a series of flashbacks to Dunk's childhood, he and his friend Rafe scavenge from a battlefield. They return to Flea Bottom in King's Landing and pickpocket from Alester, a City Watchman. Dunk and Rafe attempt to buy passage to the Free Cities in Essos, but cannot afford it. Alester corners them and takes their money. Rafe steals Alester's dagger, but he notices and slits her throat. Arlan emerges from a tavern and kills Alester, saving Dunk, who then follows Arlan on his travels. In the present, Dunk duels Aerion on foot until both men collapse from injury. After Dunk falls unconscious, Aerion declares him dead. Egg begs Dunk to get up, and the crowd chants for Dunk as he stands. Dunk and Aerion resume their duel until Dunk gets the upper hand. Aerion yields and withdraws his accusation. In the aftermath, Beesbury and Hardyng are confirmed as killed. Dunk pledges fealty to Baelor. Raymun and Pate help Baelor remove his helmet, which Maekar struck with his mace during the trial, revealing a fatal wound. Baelor collapses from his injury and dies in Dunk's arms.
6	"The Morrow"	Sarah Adina Smith	Ira Parker & Ti Mikkel	February 22, 2026	0.626
Lyonel invites Dunk to Storm's End, but Dunk believes that he brings only bad luck. Baelor's body is cremated at his funeral. Dunk meets Valarr, who questions why his father died, but Dunk was left alive. Raymun reveals he has married the prostitute Red. Maekar summons Dunk to inform him that Aerion will spend time in the Free Cities to atone. They commiserate over their shared responsibility in Baelor's demise. Maekar invites Dunk to Summerhall to take Egg as his squire. Dunk declines, which Egg overhears. In a flashback, Dunk asks a dying Arlan why he was never knighted. Arlan retorts that a true knight always finishes a story. In the present, Daeron tells Dunk that he should mentor Egg lest he become like Aerion. Egg discovers that his hair is regrowing. He takes a knife to Aerion's bedroom, but Maekar calms him down. Dunk asks Maekar if Egg can squire for him on the road, which Maekar refuses. Raymun buys Sweetfoot back for Dunk, who then gifts her to Raymun. As Dunk departs Ashford, Egg joins him, claiming to have his father's permission. Egg suggests that they travel to Dorne. An angry Maekar later realizes that Egg is gone.

== Production ==
=== Background ===
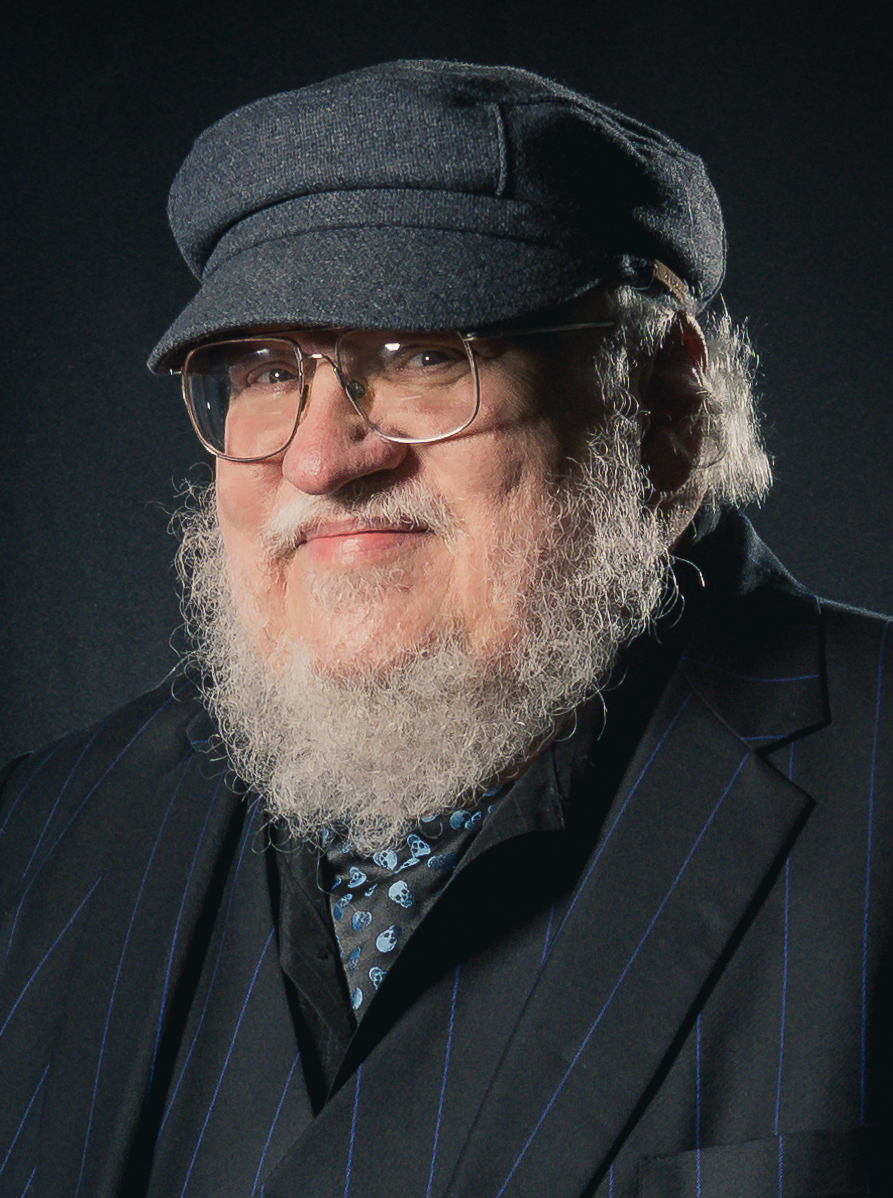
Show co-creator and executive producer George R. R. Martin

In February 2013, George R. R. Martin commented that he had been in discussions with HBO regarding a potential adaptation of his Dunk and Egg novellas. In March 2014, Martin expressed interest in adapting his Dunk and Egg stories for the screen, suggesting that they could serve as the basis for a film. In July 2015, HBO programming president Michael Lombardo remarked that there was "enormous storytelling to be mined" in a prequel to Game of Thrones. In April 2016, Lombardo clarified that no Game of Thrones spin-offs were in development. Shortly after, Martin suggested that the most "natural successor" to the series would be an adaptation of his Dunk and Egg stories, adding that his preferred format would be a "two-hour standalone television film" for each novella. In November 2016, HBO's new programming president Casey Bloys confirmed that preliminary discussions were underway regarding a prequel project.

In May 2017, Martin stated that a Dunk and Egg television adaptation was not in development, explaining that while he would like to pursue the project, he preferred to wait until the novella series—three stories published at the time, with seven to eight more planned—was complete, to avoid a situation similar to Game of Thrones, in which the television series outpaced the source material. In July 2022, it was revealed that Martin had formally pitched a Dunk and Egg adaptation to HBO in 2016. The network ultimately declined the proposal in favor of another concept, The Dance of the Dragons, which later entered development as House of the Dragon.

Ryan Condal, showrunner for House of the Dragon, explained in a 2020 interview that he participated in the first and last stages of the initial cycle of prequel proposals. In early 2016, he approached Martin to suggest a series based on Dunk & Egg, but Martin rejected the idea because he wanted to finish that saga first. For that reason, Condal's suggestion never became a formal proposal nor was it part of the group of projects that HBO initially evaluated and rejected. After that failed attempt, Condal returned to the process in 2019 to lead House of the Dragon. Martin offered a different version in a podcast with Condal in September 2021. There, he acknowledged that Dunk & Egg was among the two prequel proposals he originally presented to HBO, along with The Dance of the Dragons. According to Martin, HBO rejected Dunk & Egg and asked him for more alternatives, which led to four additional ideas. Condal independently proposed a Dunk & Egg series to Martin, unaware that HBO had already scrapped the project. This crossover of versions confirms that Martin ended up considering Dunk & Egg as one of his two preferred options for a prequel series, along with The Dance of the Dragons.

=== Development ===
HBO announced that it was developing a new television prequel series to Game of Thrones in January 2021. The series follows the adventures of Ser Duncan the Tall and a young Aegon V Targaryen, nicknamed Egg, and is based on the novellas by George R. R. Martin that constitute the Tales of Dunk and Egg, taking place 90 years before A Song of Ice and Fire. There were reports that Steven Conrad was hired to write for the series in November 2021. The series received an official order from HBO in April 2023. By then, Ira Parker, a writer on the first season of House of the Dragon, had already written the script for a pilot episode. According to Martin, the series' writers' room shut down during the 2023 Writers Guild of America strike. Casting began in October 2023 with plans to begin filming in 2024. By February 2024, Warner Bros. Discovery CEO David Zaslav confirmed that the series had begun pre-production and that Martin was serving as creator and executive producer.

In May, Owen Harris was hired to direct the first three episodes and serve as an executive producer, setting the tone for the series. That June, Sarah Adina Smith was announced to direct three of the six episodes of the first season. Dan Romer scored the series. In November 2025, ahead of the first-season premiere, the series was renewed for a second season, which is expected to be released in 2027. In January 2026, Parker disclosed that Martin had provided him with outlines for twelve unpublished Dunk and Egg stories. According to Parker, HBO intends to adapt only the three novellas that have been officially published. Parker, however, envisions adapting all twelve stories, planning to release four initially, followed by four more a decade later, and the final four ten years thereafter.

=== Casting ===
In April 2024, the lead roles were cast with Peter Claffey as Ser Duncan the Tall and Dexter Sol Ansell as Egg. In June, it was announced that Finn Bennett, Bertie Carvel, Tanzyn Crawford, Daniel Ings, and Sam Spruell had joined the cast as Prince Aerion Targaryen, Prince Baelor Targaryen, Tanselle, Ser Lyonel Baratheon, and Prince Maekar Targaryen, respectively. In August, Edward Ashley, Henry Ashton, Youssef Kerkour, Daniel Monks, Shaun Thomas, Tom Vaughan-Lawlor, and Danny Webb were cast as Ser Steffon Fossoway, Daeron Targaryen, Steely Pate, Ser Manfred Dondarrion, Raymun Fossoway, Plummer, and Ser Arlan of Pennytree, respectively. Additionally, Ross Anderson appears as Ser Humfrey Hardyng and Steve Wall as Lord Leo Tyrell.

In March 2026, Lucy Boynton, Babou Ceesay, and Peter Mullan were cast as Lady Rohanne Webber, Ser Bennis of the Brown Shield, and Ser Eustace Osgrey, respectively, for the second season. Kathryn Hunter was cast as Lady Vaith.

=== Filming ===
Principal photography began in June 2024 in Belfast, Northern Ireland, and wrapped in September. Filming for the second season began in December 2025 in Belfast. Production in Gran Canary, Spain, was scheduled to take place from February to May 2026, but was halted due to Storm Therese. Filming for the second season was scheduled to wrap in June, but eventually wrapped in August 2026.

== Release ==
The first season premiered on HBO and HBO Max on January 18, 2026, and consists of six episodes. It was originally planned for release in late 2025. The series premiered in Berlin on January 13, 2026, at the launch event for HBO Max in Germany.

The first season was released on home media on June 16, 2026.

== Reception ==
=== Critical response ===
The review aggregator website Rotten Tomatoes reported a 94% approval rating, based on 180 critic reviews, with an average rating of 8.25/10. The website's critics consensus reads: "A Knight of the Seven Kingdoms is a welcome return to Westeros that works better in the buddy-comedy arena rather than solely slaying its competition." Metacritic, which uses a weighted average, gave a score of 75 out of 100, based on 38 critics, indicating "generally favorable" reviews.

Neil Armstrong of the BBC called the series "a total delight from start to finish", rating it five stars. He commended the leads' performances, writing that Claffey and Ansell were "brilliant" and had "extraordinary" chemistry. Daniel Fienberg of The Hollywood Reporter praised the series' scale, calling it a "smaller, smarter, funnier and more charming glimpse into George R.R. Martin's bigger-is-better realm". Tasha Robinson of Polygon wrote that A Knight of the Seven Kingdoms was the "best path forward for the franchise", praising the "excellent character work and scene-setting". In The Washington Post, Jen Chaney praised the series' final battle for being "as intense as anything in [Game of Thrones]" while keeping its narrow scope through Dunk's eyes. Lucy Mangan, writing for The Guardian, also touted Ansell's acting, calling him "a mighty screen presence" and "quite fascinating to watch", and rated the series three out of five stars.

In a negative review, Therese Lacson of Collider criticized the series for not expanding on the source material, despite its shortness, and for "sorely lacking in female characters". This criticism was echoed by Fienberg and by Glen Weldon of NPR, who in a generally positive review wrote that "the only women with speaking parts are either sex workers or love interests" that "get relegated to plot devices". Louis Chilton of The Independent criticized the series' use of crass humor and nudity, rating it two out of five stars, and finding that it could not justify its existence independently from Game of Thrones.

=== Accolades ===
Year	Award	Category	Nominee(s)	Result	Ref.
2026	Astra TV Awards	Best Book to Screen Series	A Knight of the Seven Kingdoms	Nominated	
2026	Critics' Choice Super Awards	Best Science Fiction / Fantasy Series, Limited Series, or Made-for-TV Movie	A Knight of the Seven Kingdoms	Nominated	
2026	Critics' Choice Super Awards	Best Actor in a Science Fiction / Fantasy Series, Limited Series, or Made-for-TV Movie	Dexter Sol Ansell	Nominated	
2026	Critics' Choice Super Awards	Best Actor in a Science Fiction / Fantasy Series, Limited Series, or Made-for-TV Movie	Peter Claffey	Nominated	
2026	Dragon Awards	Best Science Fiction or Fantasy TV Series, TV or Internet	A Knight of the Seven Kingdoms	Won	
2026	Gotham TV Awards	Breakthrough Drama Series	George R. R. Martin, Ira Parker, Sarah Bradshaw, Ryan Condal, Vince Gerardis, and Owen Harris	Nominated	
2026	Gotham TV Awards	Outstanding Lead Performance in a Drama Series	Peter Claffey	Nominated	
2026	Gotham TV Awards	Outstanding Supporting Performance in a Drama Series	Dexter Sol Ansell	Nominated	
2026	Location Managers Guild International Awards	Outstanding Locations in a Period TV Series	A Knight of the Seven Kingdoms	Nominated	
2026	Primetime Emmy Awards	Outstanding Drama Series	Ira Parker, George R. R. Martin, Sarah Bradshaw, Ryan Condal, Owen Harris, Vince Gerardis, Aziza Barnes, Hiram Martinez, Annie Julia Wyman, Sarah Adina Smith, Layla Blackman, and Lisa Byrne	Nominated	
2026	Primetime Creative Arts Emmy Awards	Outstanding Cinematography for a Series (Half-Hour)	Gustav Danielsson (for "In the Name of the Mother")	Nominated	
2026	Primetime Creative Arts Emmy Awards	Outstanding Fantasy/Sci-Fi Costumes	Lorna Ó Ríordáin, Libby Dempster, Kyle Callanan, Rachael W. Crozier, and Stephen O Rawe (for "Seven")	Nominated	
2026	Primetime Creative Arts Emmy Awards	Outstanding Music Composition for a Series (Original Dramatic Score)	Dan Romer (for "In the Name of the Mother")	Nominated	
2026	Primetime Creative Arts Emmy Awards	Outstanding Period or Fantasy/Sci-Fi Hairstyling	Pippa Woods, Lucille Harding, Tamara-May Richards, Anna Knight, Cat Coogan, and Lauren Appleby (for "The Morrow")	Nominated	
2026	Primetime Creative Arts Emmy Awards	Outstanding Production Design for a Narrative Program (Half-Hour)	Tom McCullagh, John Merry, and Stephanie Rea (for "Seven")	Nominated	
2026	Primetime Creative Arts Emmy Awards	Outstanding Sound Editing for a Comedy or Drama Series (Half-Hour) and Animation	Alastair Sirkett, Martin Cantwell, Michele Woods, Adéle Fletcher, Ruth Knight, Neil Stemp, Barnaby Smyth, and Rebecca Glover (for "In the Name of the Mother")	Nominated	
2026	Primetime Creative Arts Emmy Awards	Outstanding Special Visual Effects in a Single Episode	Arron Roebuck, Paul Russo, Luke Dhand, Angel Rico Riesgo, Sonsoles L. Aranguren, Rocío Ruiz de Azúa, Mike Dawson, Tom Lloyd, and Paul Tuersley (for "In the Name of the Mother")	Nominated	
2026	Primetime Creative Arts Emmy Awards	Outstanding Stunt Performance	Zach Roberts, Gyula Tóth, Chris Cox, and Jake Cox (for "In the Name of the Mother")	Won	
2026	TCA Awards	Outstanding Achievement in Drama	A Knight of the Seven Kingdoms	Nominated	
2026	TCA Awards	Outstanding New Program	A Knight of the Seven Kingdoms	Nominated	

=== Viewership and commercial impact ===
Four days after the series premiere, Warner Bros. Discovery (WBD) said the episode had been viewed by an estimated 6.7 million viewers in the U.S. on its first three nights of availability – including linear viewers and streams on HBO Max – which it said was the third-largest three-day viewership for a series debut in the service's history. Three days after the premiere of episode five, "In the Name of the Mother", HBO announced that the series was averaging nearly 13 million viewers per episode in the United States. This put the show on track to become the third-largest series debut in HBO Max history. The network also reported that three-day viewership had increased week over week for each episode, with the exception of episode four, which was released earlier than usual due to Super Bowl LX. On February 26, 2026, four days after the broadcast of "The Morrow", WBD announced that the first season was averaging 14 million viewers per episode in the United States and 26 million worldwide; this performance made the series the third most-watched series premiere since the launch of HBO Max.

By February 2026, the graphic novel adaptation of The Hedge Knight—the first of Martin's three Dunk and Egg novellas—had reached No. 3 on Amazon's Comics and Graphic Novels chart, outselling Absolute Batman Vol. 1. The second installment, The Sworn Sword, ranked No. 7, while The Mystery Knight had yet to enter the top 100.
