= Primetime Emmy Award for Outstanding Stunt Performance =

Category since 2021

- Awarded for: Outstanding Stunt Performance
- Country: United States
- Presented by: Academy of Television Arts and Sciences
- Currently held by: Zach Roberts, Gyula Tóth, Chris Cox and Jake Cox, A Knight of the Seven Kingdoms (2026)
- Website: emmys.com

The Primetime Emmy Award for Outstanding Stunt Performance is awarded to one television program each year. The category was created in 2021 and is separate from the award for Outstanding Stunt Coordination. It recognizes individual stunt performers as well as teams.

In the following list, the first titles listed in gold are the winners; those not in gold are nominees, which are listed in alphabetical order. The years given are those in which the ceremonies took place:

== Winners and nominations ==
=== 2020s ===
Year	Program	Episode	Nominee	Network
2021 (73rd)
2021 (73rd)	The Mandalorian	"Chapter 16: The Rescue"	Lateef Crowder	Disney+
2021 (73rd)	Cobra Kai	"December 19"	Marc Canonizado, John Cihangir, Jahnel Curfman and Julia Maggio	Netflix
2021 (73rd)	The Falcon and the Winter Soldier	"Truth"	Justin Eaton, John Nania and Aaron Toney	Disney+
2021 (73rd)	Gangs of London	"Episode 2"	Mens-Sana Tamakloe	AMC+
2021 (73rd)	Lovecraft Country	"I Am."	Janeshia Adams-Ginyard	HBO
2022 (74th)
2022 (74th)	Squid Game	"Stick to the Team"	Lim Tae-hoon, Shim Sang-min, Kim Cha-i and Lee Tae-young	Netflix
2022 (74th)	Barry	"710N"	Clay Cullen, David Castillo, Jolene Van Vugt and Chris Morrison	HBO
2022 (74th)	The Blacklist	"Between Sleep and Awake"	Chad Hessler	NBC
2022 (74th)	Hawkeye	"Echoes"	Carl Richard Burden, Noon Orsatti, Renae Moneymaker and Crystal Hooks	Disney+
2022 (74th)	Moon Knight	"Gods and Monsters"	Daren Nop, Jamel Blissat, Estelle Darnault and Sara Leal	Disney+
2022 (74th)	Stranger Things	"Chapter Four: Dear Billy"	Matthew Scheib and Jura Yury Kruze	Netflix
2023 (75th)
2023 (75th)	The Mandalorian	"Chapter 24: The Return"	Lateef Crowder, Paul Darnell, JJ Dashnaw and Ryan Ryusaki	Disney+
2023 (75th)	FBI: Most Wanted	"Black Mirror"	Chad Hessler	CBS
2023 (75th)	Stranger Things	"Chapter Nine: The Piggyback"	Courtney Schwartz and Michelle Andrea Adams	Netflix
2023 (75th)	Stranger Things	"Chapter Nine: The Piggyback"	Jahnel Curfman, Niko Dalman and Shannon Beshears	Netflix
2024 (76th)
2024 (76th)	Shōgun	"The Eightfold Fence"	Hiroo Minami, Nobuyuki Obikane, Martin Cochingco and Johnson Phan	FX
2024 (76th)	The Continental: From the World of John Wick	"Theatre of Pain"	Jay Hawkins, Jerry Quill and Ivy Haralson	Peacock
2024 (76th)	Fallout	"The Target"	Justice Hedenberg, Hannah Scott, Adam Shippey and Noelle Mulligan	Prime Video
2024 (76th)	Mr. & Mrs. Smith	"A Breakup"	Tara Macken	Prime Video
2024 (76th)	The Righteous Gemstones	"Burn for Burn, Wound for Wound, Stripe for Stripe"	Ryan Disharoon, Mike Endoso, Jett Jansen Fernandez and Rich King	HBO
2025 (77th)
2025 (77th)	The Boys	"The Insider"	Jennifer Murray, River Godland, Alec Back and Moses Nyarko	Prime Video
2025 (77th)	FBI: Most Wanted	"Moving On"	Evelyn O. Vaccaro and Alex Huynh	CBS
2025 (77th)	The Penguin	"Top Hat"	Corey Pierno and Chris Gombos	HBO
2025 (77th)	The Rookie	"Til Death"	Sonja Wajih and Paul Lacovara	ABC
2025 (77th)	Severance	"Cold Harbor"	Justice Hedenberg, Katie Rowe and Erik Martin	Apple TV+
2026 (78th)
2026 (78th)	A Knight of the Seven Kingdoms	"In the Name of the Mother"	Zach Roberts, Gyula Tóth, Chris Cox and Jake Cox	HBO
2026 (78th)	Fallout	"The Profligate"	Jeremy Fitzgerald and Tim Soergel	Prime Video
2026 (78th)	FBI	"Crusader"	Adam Shippey, Hannah Scott, Bryce Biederman and Chris Barnes	CBS
2026 (78th)	Palm Royale	"Maxine Finds Herself"	Sonja Wajih and Colby Lemmo	Apple TV
2026 (78th)	Spider-Noir	"Tread Lightly"	Solomon Brende, Jimmy Chhiu, Micaiah Chau and Kyle Potter	MGM+ / Prime Video

== Programs with multiple awards ==
2 wins

- The Mandalorian

== Programs with multiple nominations ==
3 nominations

- Stranger Things

2 nominations

- Fallout
- FBI: Most Wanted
- The Mandalorian

== Performers with multiple awards ==
2 wins

- Lateef Crowder

== Performers with multiple nominations ==
3 nominations

- Justice Hedenberg

2 nominations

- Lateef Crowder
- Jahnel Curfman
- Chad Hessler
- Hannah Scott
- Adam Shippey
- Sonja Wajih
