= Edward Ashley (English actor) =

English actor

Edward Ashley is an English actor.

== Career ==
Ashley made his acting debut in the BBC One television series Last Tango in Halifax, appearing in the series before departing after the second season. In 2015, Ashley appeared in a support role in Ron Howard's In the Heart of the Sea, an inspiration for the novel Moby Dick. He next starred alongside Charlie Hunnam and Robert Pattinson in The Lost City of Z, and would appear in a supporting role in the AMC horror anthology series The Terror.

Ashley made his stage debut in a production of The Lady from the Sea that ran at Coronet Theatre, London from February to March 2019. His performance as Lyngstrand saw positive reviews from critics. Later in the year he would star alongside Timothée Chalamet in The King.

In 2024, he appeared in the Apple TV+ war drama miniseries Masters of the Air as Lt. Col. John B. Kidd, reuniting with his Last Tango in Halifax co-stars Josh Bolt and Louis Greatorex. Later that year, he was cast as Ser Steffon Fossoway in A Knight of the Seven Kingdoms, another instalment in the Game of Thrones franchise.

== Filmography ==
=== Film ===
Year	Title	Role	Notes
2015	In the Heart of the Sea	Barzillai Ray	
2016	The Lost City of Z	Arthur Manley	
2019	The King	Earl of Cambridge	

=== Television ===
Year	Title	Role	Notes
2012-2013	Last Tango in Halifax	William	Recurring role, 11 episodes
2015	Sense8	Nocker	1 episode
2018	The Terror	William Gibson	Recurring role, 8 episodes
2024	Masters of the Air	Maj. Jack Kidd	Miniseries, 7 episodes
2026	A Knight of the Seven Kingdoms	Ser Steffon Fossoway	Recurring role, 4 episodes
TBA	Army of Shadows †		Upcoming series
