= Tales of Dunk and Egg =

Series of novellas by George R. R. Martin

A Knight of the Seven Kingdoms
- US edition front cover for the combined novellas: A Knight of the Seven Kingdoms
- Author: George R. R. Martin
- Audio read by: Frank Muller; Harry Lloyd
- Language: English
- Series: A Song of Ice and Fire
- Genre: Fantasy
- Published: Novellas: • The Hedge Knight; (August 25, 1998); • The Sworn Sword; (December 30, 2003); • The Mystery Knight; (March 16, 2010); Graphic novels: • The Hedge Knight; (2005); • The Sworn Sword; (2008); • The Mystery Knight; (2017); Illustrated novella collection: • A Knight of the Seven Kingdoms; (October 6, 2015)
- Published in: Legends; Legends II; Warriors
- Publication place: United States

Tales of Dunk and Egg, also known as A Knight of the Seven Kingdoms, is a series of fantasy novellas by George R. R. Martin, set in the world of his A Song of Ice and Fire novels. They follow the adventures of "Dunk" (Ser Duncan the Tall, a hedge knight) and "Egg" (Prince Aegon Targaryen, the future King Aegon V), some 90 years before the events of the novels.

Three novellas have been published—The Hedge Knight (1998), The Sworn Sword (2003), and The Mystery Knight (2010)—and Martin has stated his intention to continue the series. The existing three novellas were also adapted into graphic novels, which were released in 2005, 2008, and 2017. A collection of the three novellas, with illustrations by Gary Gianni, was published as A Knight of the Seven Kingdoms on October 6, 2015.

An HBO television adaptation, also named A Knight of the Seven Kingdoms, premiered on January 18, 2026, with the first season covering the events of The Hedge Knight, while a second season has been confirmed, which will be based on The Sworn Sword and is expected to be released in 2027.

== Novellas ==
The first novella was originally published on August 25, 1998, in the Legends anthology, edited by Robert Silverberg. The story was later adapted into a six-issue comic book limited series by Ben Avery, drawn by Mike S. Miller, produced by Roaring Studios (now Dabel Brothers Productions) and published by Image Comics and Devil's Due between August 2003 and May 2004. Devil's Due published the complete limited series as a graphic novel in June 2004. Following the termination of the partnership between Dabel Brothers and Devil's Due, the graphic novel has been republished in various editions.

The second novella was published in 2003 in the Legends II anthology, also edited by Robert Silverberg. The story has been adapted into a graphic novel by Ben Avery and drawn by Mike S. Miller, in cooperation with publisher and distributor Marvel Comics. The first comic was released on June 20, 2007, and the graphic novel was released on June 18, 2008.

The third novella was published in 2010 in the anthology Warriors, edited by George R. R. Martin and Gardner Dozois. The story was once again adapted into a graphic novel by Ben Avery and drawn by Mike S. Miller, this time without being published as single issues first, in cooperation with publisher and distributor Bantam in 2017. Like The Sworn Sword, the book takes place during the reign of Aerys I and the aftermath of the Blackfyre Rebellion is examined in more detail.

=== The Hedge Knight ===
The Hedge Knight
- The graphic novel adaptation of The Hedge Knight (second edition), the first novella in the Tales of Dunk and Egg series
- Author: George R. R. Martin
- Audio read by: Frank Muller; Harry Lloyd
- Language: English
- Series: A Song of Ice and Fire
- Genre: Fantasy
- Published in: Legends
- Publisher: Dabel Brothers Productions
- Publication date: • August 25, 1998 (original novella); • 2005 (graphic novel)
- Publication place: United States
- ISBN: 0-9764011-0-X (graphic novel)
- OCLC: 57692652
- Followed by: The Sworn Sword

The story opens with the death of Ser Arlan of Pennytree, a wandering "hedge knight". Ser Arlan's worldly goods are inherited by Dunk, his squire. Eager to claim the glory Arlan never found in life, Dunk sets out for the town of Ashford, where a tourney is due to be held. En route, he meets a boy named "Egg" who wants Dunk to take him as his squire. Dunk declines and continues to Ashford. Egg follows Dunk, and Dunk eventually accepts Egg as his squire for the duration of the tourney. The steward at Ashford is unimpressed by Dunk's credentials when Dunk tries to enter the tourney, but Crown Prince Baelor speaks up on his behalf, and Dunk is permitted to enter the tourney under the name "Ser Duncan the Tall".

Before he can compete, Dunk sees Prince Aerion, Baelor's nephew, breaking a puppeteer girl's finger, and strikes him. Aerion orders his guards to give Dunk a beating, but Egg intervenes, revealing that his real name is Aegon and that he is Aerion's younger brother. Dunk exercises his right to face Aerion in a trial by combat; Aerion (backed by his father, Prince Maekar) demands that it be a "trial of seven", in which two parties of seven knights contend on horseback.

With help from Egg, Dunk succeeds in recruiting five knights for the trial. He remains one short until Prince Baelor himself joins his party. In the ensuing fray, Dunk triumphs over Aerion and forces him to yield. Three members of Dunk's party are killed, however, including Baelor, who is critically injured by a blow from Maekar's mace.

Later, a rueful Maekar approaches Dunk with a proposition. Realizing that Aegon needs a mentor if he is to become a better man than Aerion, he wants Dunk to continue training the boy at Summerhall, the Targaryens' palace. Dunk argues that the boy needs to experience life outside the palace, and Maekar agrees. Dunk, with Egg as his squire, sets out on a life of adventure.

=== The Sworn Sword ===
The story begins in the Reach with Duncan the Tall sworn to Ser Eustace Osgrey of Standfast, and illuminates several aspects of the feudal system of Westeros. A series of flashbacks narrated by Ser Eustace relate the events of the Blackfyre Rebellion and its conclusion at the Battle of the Redgrass Field.

At the fort of Standfast, Dunk and Ser Eustace's other sworn sword, Ser Bennis of the Brown Shield, discover that a dam has been built across the local stream, by peasants in service to Lady Rohanne Webber of Coldmoat. Ser Bennis reacts angrily, cutting the cheek of one of the peasants. Upon hearing the news, Ser Eustace realizes that Lady Webber will be angered by Ser Bennis's actions against her servants, and orders Dunk and Ser Bennis to train levies from his three villages. For a peaceful solution, Ser Eustace sends Dunk to Coldmoat, where Dunk learns that Lady Rohanne stands to lose her lands to a male cousin if she does not take a fifth husband by the second anniversary of her father's death. Her castellan, the haughty Ser Lucas Inchfield (known as the "Long Inch" for his 6-foot 7-inch height), is her most insistent suitor, but she has already refused him. Dunk fails to change the Lady's mind on either the dam's construction or seeking justice for her servant, and Rohanne informs him that Ser Eustace is a former traitor, who supported the usurper Daemon Blackfyre, and has therefore been stripped of most of his lands. When Dunk attempts to appeal to Rohanne's fond memories of Ser Eustace's youngest son, Addam, she angrily slaps him and demands he leave; as Dunk departs, he learns that she was once in love with Addam, who died at Redgrass Field.

Shocked by the news of Ser Eustace's past treason, Dunk returns to Standfast to leave the old knight's service. That night, Ser Eustace's forest is burned, and Duncan recalls Lady Rohanne's threat of "fire and sword" to destroy Standfast. He therefore disperses the levies, and promises to oppose Lady Rohanne himself. At the river, Dunk rides into the ford to parley with Lady Rohanne where the noise of the water will prevent anyone on either bank from overhearing them. Before he enters the stream, Ser Eustace suggests that Dunk should kill Lady Rohanne at this meeting. Instead, Dunk offers his own blood to Lady Rohanne by slicing his cheek. This pays the debt for the wounded peasant; and for the claim that Lady Rohanne had the forest burned, she demands an apology or vindication, and all agree upon trial by combat between Dunk and Ser Lucas, to be fought in the stream as the only neutral ground present. In the fight, Dunk is nearly outfought by Ser Lucas, but drowns him and nearly drowns himself, but is resuscitated by Lady Rohanne's maester. When he awakens, Dunk learns that Ser Eustace and Lady Rohanne are now married, to reconcile their debts. Before Dunk leaves, Rohanne implies that she would have sooner married Dunk if he was not of low birth, but instead offers him her finest mare to make amends; and when he refuses, Lady Rohanne insists that he take something to remember her by, and he pulls her into a passionate kiss, and takes a length of her hair as a keepsake. Thereafter he and Egg ride with the intent to reach the Wall.

=== The Mystery Knight ===
The story begins with Dunk and Egg leaving Stoney Sept for Winterfell, to seek service with Lord Beron Stark against Greyjoy raids on the northern coast. On the way they encounter a septon beheaded for preaching treason; and later a group of knights and minor lords traveling to a tourney in honor of the wedding of Lord Butterwell of Whitewalls to a Frey of the Crossing, wherein the victor's prize is a dragon egg. Dunk takes a dislike to Gormon Peake, whom he believes the killer of his own mentor's former squire. Egg tells Dunk that Peake's arms of three castles on an orange field is because the Peake family owned three castles, but forfeited two to the Crown when Peake sided with Daemon Blackfyre in his rebellion. During the journey Dunk befriends three other itinerant knights: Ser Maynard Plumm, Ser Kyle the Cat of Misty Moor, and Ser Glendon Ball who claims to be the bastard son of the famous knight Quentyn "Fireball", who fought for Daemon Blackfyre.

The wedding is set at Whitewalls and Lord Frey arrives with his four-year-old heir, Walder Frey, and his fifteen-year-old daughter, who weds Lord Butterwell (and is alleged to have been caught by Walder having lost her virginity to a servant). Egg becomes increasingly suspicious when he sees that most of the competitors belonged to the rebel party during the Blackfyre Rebellion. During the wedding, Dunk is drafted by John the Fiddler to carry the bride to the bedchamber. Dunk does so and later hears from John that the latter once saw Duncan himself, in a dream, wearing the white armor of the Kingsguard. Dunk enters the first match of the joust under the name of 'Gallows Knight' (for a new shield acquired after the loss of his own), but is defeated in the first tilt by Ser Uthor Underleaf, known as the Snail Knight for his sigil. Duncan later gives Underleaf his armor and horse as forfeit, and Underleaf informs Dunk that someone bribed him to kill Dunk in the tilt. Before the jousting continues, word spreads through the castle that the dragon egg is missing, and the blame is placed on Ser Glendon Ball, who is then imprisoned by Peake. While searching for Egg, who has gone missing, Duncan is attacked by Alyn Cockshaw. Cockshaw claims to have bribed Uthor Underleaf. Dunk foils the attack and throws him into a well. Maynard Plumm comes to Duncan's aid, and it is discovered that Plumm is one of Brynden "Bloodraven" Rivers' many spies (or possibly Bloodraven himself), and that John the Fiddler is the eponymous son of Daemon Blackfyre. Dunk finds Egg in the sept with the cowering Lord Butterwell, who on discovering Egg's true identity is terrified for his life. Lord Butterwell's son-in-law Black Tom Heddle tries to kill Egg to incite a war, and is killed by Duncan, who thereupon tells Egg to flee with Butterwell. To buy time for Egg's escape, Dunk confronts the younger Daemon Blackfyre, and accuses Gormon Peake of falsely charging Ball with the theft of the dragon egg.

Daemon allows Ball to prove his innocence in trial by combat, in which Ser Glendon soundly defeats Daemon. By this time, a large army under Bloodraven, who is also the King's Hand, encircles Whitewalls, and Daemon is captured. Dunk and Egg meet Bloodraven, and Egg demands that Bloodraven reward Glendon, Duncan, and the other hedge knights. Gormon Peake is beheaded for treason. For surrendering to Bloodraven without a fight, Lord Butterwell is spared his life and allowed a tenth of his wealth; but his fortress is forfeit to the Iron Throne and torn down. Dunk asks after Daemon's fate; Bloodraven replies that he will be spared and kept as a hostage to prevent the Blackfyres from making him a martyr and crowning his younger brother Haegon instead. Bloodraven, at Egg's request, gives Dunk the gold to ransom his armor. When Egg asks Bloodraven what became of the dragon egg, Bloodraven implies it was taken by an agent of his (thought to be one of the performing dwarfs at the wedding).

=== Planned installments ===
Martin has said that he would like to write a number of these stories (varying from six to twelve from interview to interview) covering the entire lives of the two central characters, Dunk and Egg.

In 2011, Martin talked about working on a fourth novella, which was originally to be included in the anthology Dangerous Women, and a year after that, the anthology was released (which ended up instead containing The Princess and the Queen, a separate novella in the same A Song of Ice and Fire literary universe), along with a re-release of the three previously published Dunk and Egg tales, which were collected and published in the U.S. by Bantam Spectra as a stand-alone fix-up novel. The working title of the fourth novella was The She-Wolves of Winterfell. As of late 2013, work on the story had been postponed while Martin worked to complete The Winds of Winter. In April 2014, Martin also announced that he had roughed out another Dunk and Egg story with the working title The Village Hero, which would be set in the Riverlands. He noted that he was not sure which of these two would be completed first. In 2015, Martin noted that in addition to The She-Wolves of Winterfell and The Village Hero, he had notes and fairly specific ideas for a number of further installments, including The Sellsword, The Champion, The Kingsguard, and The Lord Commander, taking the planned series total to as many as nine novellas.

In April 2023, Martin reaffirmed his notion from 2014 that no further Dunk and Egg novellas would be written until after he had finished The Winds of Winter. He affirmed this again in January 2025, this time identifying The Village Hero as the next story to be written. However, in January 2026, he admitted he had tried writing two Dunk and Egg stories at various points in 2025, one set in Winterfell (presumably The She-Wolves of Winterfell) and one set in the Riverlands (presumably The Village Hero).

== Family tree ==
Family tree

Baelor "The Blessed"; 161–171	Daena "The Defiant"	Aegon IV "The Unworthy"; 172–184	Naerys
Daemon I Blackfyre	Rohanne of Tyrosh	Aegor Rivers "Bittersteel"	Brynden; Rivers "Bloodraven"	Shiera Seastar	Gwenys Rivers	Mya Rivers	Daeron II "The Good"; 184–209	Myriah; Martell
Aegon; Blackfyre	Aemon; Blackfyre	Daemon II; Blackfyre	Haegon; Blackfyre	Aenys; Blackfyre	Two sons	Daughter(s)	Calla; Blackfyre	Baelor "Breakspear"	Aerys I 209–221	Aelinor; Penrose	Rhaegel	Alys Arryn	Maekar; 221–233	Dyanna Dayne
Daemon III; Blackfyre	Son(s)	Aelor	Aelora	Daenora	Aerion "Brightflame"	Daeron "The Drunken"	Aemon	Aegon V "The Unlikely"; 233–259	Betha "Black Betha"; Blackwood	Rhae	Daella
Maegor	Duncan	Jaehaerys II; 259–262	Shaera	Daeron	Rhaelle

== Adaptations ==
=== Graphic novels ===
The novellas were adapted as comic books which were reprinted as graphic novels:

- Martin, George R. R.; Avery, Ben; Miller, Mike S.; Crowell, Mike (2005). The Hedge Knight (2nd ed.). Dabel Brothers. ISBN 978-0-9764011-0-0.
- Martin, George R. R.; Avery, Ben; Miller, Mike S.; Crowell, Mike (2008). The Sworn Sword. Marvel. ISBN 978-0-7851-2650-8.
- Martin, George R. R.; Avery, Ben; Miller, Mike S. (2017). The Mystery Knight. Bantam. ISBN 978-0345549396.

=== Television series ===
Martin wrote in 2014 that film or TV adaptations of the novellas were being discussed. He suggested that because HBO owns the TV rights to the setting of Westeros (if not to the characters of the novellas), it would be preferable to have HBO adapt the novellas as well. On January 21, 2021, Variety reported that an adaptation of the Tales of Dunk and Egg series, a prequel to the events of Game of Thrones, was in early development on HBO. It was given a straight to series order on April 12, 2023. The show stars Peter Claffey and Dexter Sol Ansell as Dunk and Egg, respectively. Filming began in Belfast, Northern Ireland in June 2024. The series premiered on January 18, 2026, on HBO. The first season covers the events of the first novella, The Hedge Knight, while a second season has been confirmed, which will be based on The Sworn Sword and is expected to be released in 2027.
