= Daniel Ings =

British actor (born 1985)

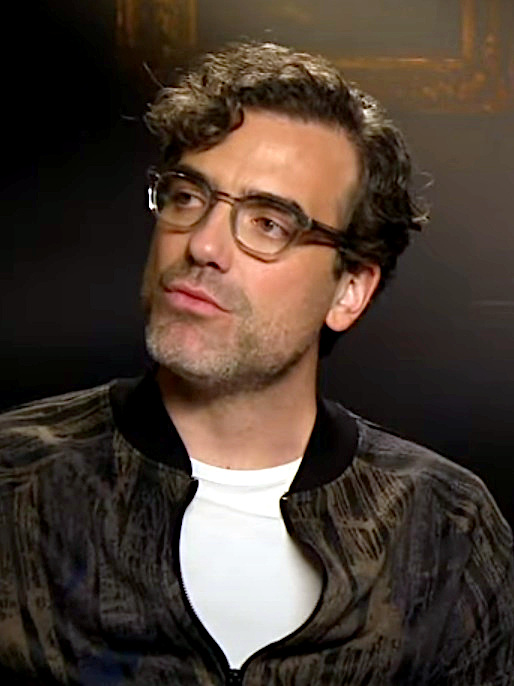
- Ings in 2024
- Born: 30 November 1985 (age 40); Exeter, England
- Occupation: Actor
- Years active: 2004–present

Daniel Ings (born 30 November 1985) is a British actor. He is known for starring as Luke Curran in the television series Lovesick (2014–2018), Freddy Horniman in The Gentlemen (2024) and Lord Lyonel Baratheon in A Knight of the Seven Kingdoms (2026).

== Early life ==
Ings was born in Exeter, Devon. He attended Dauntsey's School in Wiltshire, followed by Lancaster University where he studied theatre studies, graduating in 2008. Ings later trained at Bristol Old Vic Theatre School, and the National Youth Theatre, but left the course early as he started to win roles, notably a small one in Pirates of the Caribbean: On Stranger Tides.

== Career ==
Ings appeared as the playboy best friend Luke in the Netflix romantic comedy Lovesick (2014–2018). He played Jake in the Channel 4 comedy Pete versus Life, Kelvin in the BBC comedy-drama Psychoville, and John in Sky 1's comedy The Café (2011).

In 2014, he appeared as the unscrupulous "Director of Output" Matt Taverner in the BBC2 mockumentary W1A (2014–2015), and as Commander Mike Parker in the Netflix series The Crown (2016–2017). In 2018, he began playing the husband of Alan Cumming's lead character on the CBS drama television series Instinct (2018–2019).

In 2020, he appeared as Francis Marindin in Julian Fellowes' series The English Game for Netflix and as Cob, the embittered husband to Billie Piper's Suzie, in acclaimed Sky Atlantic series I Hate Suzie. In 2023, he starred as Dan in the Netflix series Sex Education. In the same year, he played Archie Osborne in the BBC One series The Gold.

In 2024, he starred as Frederick "Freddy" Horniman in the Netflix Guy Ritchie television series The Gentlemen. Ings plays a lively and likable Lyonel Baratheon in the 2026 series A Knight of the Seven Kingdoms.

== Acting credits ==
=== Film ===
Year	Title	Role	Notes	Ref.
2010	The Third One This Week	Doctor	Short film	
2010	Audiobook	Chris	Short film	
2010	Funny Money	Dan	Short film	
2011	The Last Temptation of William Shaw	William Shaw	Short film	
2011	Pirates of the Caribbean: On Stranger Tides	Guard		
2011	After Before Sunrise	Peter	Short film	
2016	Eddie the Eagle	Zach		
2017	The Great Unwashed	Ayhan		
2023	The Marvels	Ty-Rone		
2024	Plastic Surgery	The Doctor	Short film	
2025	The Woman in Cabin 10	Adam Sutherland		
2026	Prima Facie	Julian Brooks		
2027	Star Wars: Starfighter †	TBA	Post-production	
2027	Jason Statham Stole My Bike †	TBA	Post-production	

=== Television ===
Year	Title	Role	Notes	Ref.
2010	Peep Show	Doctor	Episode: "St Hospitals"	
2010–2011	Psychoville	Kelvin	7 episodes	
2010–2011	Pete versus Life	Jake	5 episodes	
2011	The Café	John Streatfield	6 episodes	
2012	Little Crackers	Dan	Episode: "Joanna Lumley's Little Cracker: Baby, Be Blonde"	
2013	Medics	Minge	TV Movie	
2014	Uncle	Rex	Episode: "Favourites"	
2014	Mount Pleasant	Robbie	8 episodes	
2014	Endeavour	Terence Black	Episode: "Nocturne"	
2014	Give Out Girls	Edward	Episode: "Overnight Stay"	
2014–2017	W1A	Matt Taverner	8 episodes	
2014–2018	Lovesick	Luke	22 episodes	
2015	You, Me & Them	Connor	Episode: "School Reunion"	
2016	Vera	Simon	Episode: "Dark Road"	
2016	Agatha Raisin	Paul Bladen	Episode: "The Vicious Vet"	
2016–2017	The Crown	Commander Mike Parker	9 episodes	
2018–2019	Instinct	Andrew "Andy" Wilson	24 episodes	
2019	Black Mirror	David Gilkes	Episode: "Smithereens"	
2019–2023	Sex Education	Dan	7 episodes	
2020	The English Game	Francis Marindin	Miniseries; 5 episodes	
2020	Zog and the Flying Doctors	Sir Gadabout (voice) (replacing Kit Harington)	Television film	
2020–2022	I Hate Suzie	Cob Betterton	11 episodes	
2022	Why Didn't They Ask Evans?	Roger Bassington-ffrench	Miniseries; 3 episodes	
2023	The Gold	Archie Osborne	Six-part drama	
2023	The Winter King	Owain	6 episodes	
2024–2026	The Gentlemen	Frederick "Freddy" Horniman	Main role	
2026	A Knight of the Seven Kingdoms	Ser Lyonel Baratheon	6 episodes	
2026	Kill Jackie	Sam	main cast	
TBA	The Rachel Incident	Dr. Fred Byrne	Pre-production	
TBA	The Husbands		Filming	

=== Stage ===
Year	Title	Author	Role	Director	Theatre
2004	The Master and Margarita	Mikhail Bulgakov	Berlioz	John Hoggarth	Lyric Hammersmith / National Youth Theatre
2007	White Boy	Tanika Gupta	Flips	Juliet Knight	Soho Theatre / National Youth Theatre
2008	Tory Boyz	James Graham	Nicholas	Guy Hargreaves	Soho Theatre / National Youth Theatre
2010	I See Myself As a Bit of an Indiana Jones Figure	Kieran Lynn			Old Red Lion
2011	Frankenstein	Mary Shelley	Victor/Servant 1	Danny Boyle	National Theatre
2011	Howl's Moving Castle	Diana Wynne Jones	Howl	Davy and Kristin McGuire	Southwark Playhouse
2012	One Man, Two Guvnors	Richard Bean	Alan Dangle	Nicholas Hytner	Theatre Royal Haymarket
2013	Macbeth	William Shakespeare	Porter	Kenneth Branagh	National Theatre

=== Music videos ===
Year	Title	Artist(s)	Ref(s)
2024	"On Broadway"	Gustaffson	

== Awards and nominations ==
Year	Award	Category	Work	Result	Ref.
2017	Screen Actors Guild Awards	Outstanding Performance by an Ensemble in a Drama Series	The Crown	Nominated	
