= Henry Ashton (actor) =

English actor (born 1991)

- Born: 10 February 1991 (age 35)
- Education: Royal Conservatoire of Scotland
- Years active: 2021–present

Henry Ashton (born 10 February 1991) is an English actor and former model. On television, he is known for his roles in the Amazon Prime Video fantasy series My Lady Jane, the BBC Three teen drama A Good Girl's Guide to Murder (both 2024) and the HBO series A Knight of the Seven Kingdoms (2026).

== Early life and education ==
Ashton grew up in Buckinghamshire. He attended Millfield School from 2004 to 2009. He was interested in acting in his youth, but would bounce around in different jobs for a decade, including retail, hospitality, fashion, and music before deciding to pursue acting professionally. He initially applied to drama school at 18 but did not get into program he wanted, he was working at Harrods at the time, selling keychains and teddy bears at the gift shop. Years later he was motivated to pursue his acting dreams once more after a conversation with his friend. He had just finished a shift at his hotel job, where he worked as a manager, and during that meeting he expressed distress about his future career prospects. Soon after he applied to twelve different acting schools. He trained at the Royal Conservatoire of Scotland, graduating in 2022.

== Career ==
Prior to completing drama school, Ashton made his feature film debut portraying Kevin Shields in the 2021 Alan McGee biopic Creation Stories. After graduating, he made his television debut in the seventh season of the Starz fantasy series Outlander as Sandy Hammond, which aired in 2023.

In 2024, Ashton gained prominence through his roles as Stan Dudley in the Amazon Prime alternate history fantasy series My Lady Jane and Max Hastings in the BBC Three teen crime drama A Good Girl's Guide to Murder, both adaptations of novels. He had been cast in the former in 2022, landing the job on the day he graduated from drama school, while the latter also had an international release on Netflix.

Ashton played Prince Daeron "the Drunken" Targaryen in the HBO fantasy series A Knight of the Seven Kingdoms, a Game of Thrones prequel and adaptation of George R R Martin's Dunk and Egg series. The series premiered in 2026.

== Filmography ==
Year	Title	Role	Notes	Ref.
2021	Creation Stories	Kevin Shields		
2023	Outlander	Sandy Hammond	2 episodes	
2024	My Lady Jane	Stan Dudley	Main role	
2024–present	A Good Girl's Guide to Murder	Max Hastings	Main role	
2026	A Knight of the Seven Kingdoms	Daeron "The Drunken" Targaryen	4 episodes	
2026	Pressure	John Eisenhower		
2027	Hercule †			
TBA	Red, White & Royal Wedding †	TBA	Post-production	
