= Knight-errant =

Chivalric literature stock character

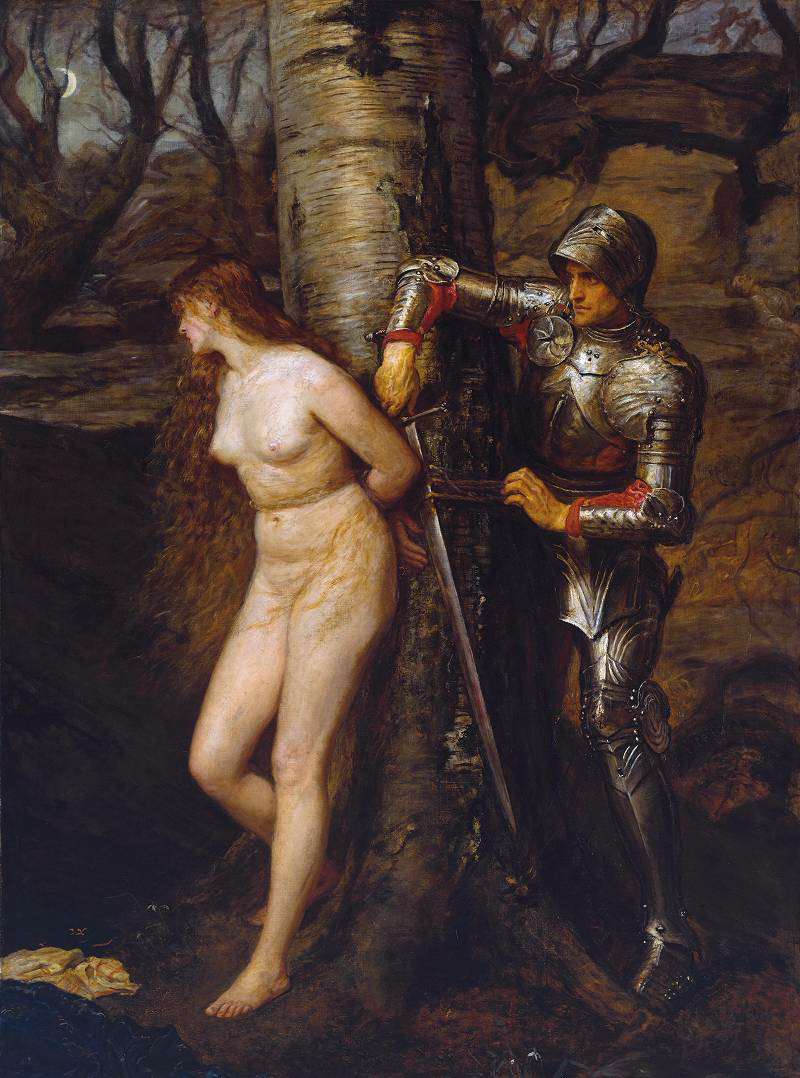
The Knight Errant by John Everett Millais (1870)

A knight-errant (or knight errant) is a figure of medieval chivalric romance literature. The adjective errant (meaning "wandering, roving") indicates how a knight would wander the land in search of adventures to prove his chivalric virtues.

== History ==
In medieval Europe, knight-errantry existed in fictional works from this time, that often were presented as non-fiction. The character type of the wandering knight existed in romantic literature as it developed during the late 12th century. However, the term "knight-errant" was to come later; its first extant usage occurs in the 14th-century poem Sir Gawain and the Green Knight.

== Chivalric romance ==
A knight-errant character does not remain in one place, but goes off on his own to right wrongs or to test and assert his own chivalric ideals, motivated by idealism and often illusory goals. He may perform all his deeds in the name of a lady and invoke her name before performing an exploit in pursuit of courtly love. His adventures may involve knightly duels (pas d'armes) and facing mythical enemies such as giants, enchantresses, or dragons.

The models of knight-errant are the heroes of the Round Table from the Arthurian legend, even as deeds of this sort are seldom attributed to Arthur himself. Arthur's many Knights of the Round Table notably include Gawain, Lancelot, Perceval, and Yvain, protagonists of adventurous, largely solitary knight-errant journeys in a series of influential chivalric romance poems written by Chrétien de Troyes in the 12th century. Their greatest quest is that for the Holy Grail, originating from Chrétien's unfinished Perceval, the Story of the Grail. Often, conventions of the genre place an importance on the knight-errant's celibacy, as in the case of Galahad, the perfect knight and achiever of the Grail in a later medieval Arthurian prose romance tradition. Less typical examples include Dagonet, a court jester balancing between the roles of a knight-errant and a royal fool in Thomas Malory's 15th-century Le Morte d'Arthur. The 13th-century French Post-Vulgate Cycle features a minor Round Table called the Table of Errant Companions, reserved for the younger knights actively seeking adventures while awaiting promotion to the main Round Table.

== Analogues ==
Russian byliny (epic poems) feature bogatyrs, knights-errant who served as protectors of their homeland, and occasionally as adventurers.

Youxia (Chinese: 遊俠), sometimes translated as the "Chinese knight-errant", is a type vigilante folk hero in Ancient China who often wanders around the countryside (known as jianghu) solo or with a small group of like-minded companions upholding their own standards of justice. Such individuals are typically martial artists whose combat prowess, social support and connections (guanxi) allows them to defy oppressive local authorities such as officials, aristocrats, and bandits through acts of chivalry. Unlike their European counterpart, Chinese xia are not confined to any particular social caste and can be anything from free-spirited noblepeople, law enforcers or warriors, to travelling scholars, poets or physicians, and to peasant militiamen, skilled hunters, or simply trained vagrants. A popular literary tradition arose during the Tang dynasty which centered on warriors with superhuman physical capabilities who saved kidnapped damsels in distress and protected underdogs from injustice and bullying, or gifted slaves who proved their worth and loyalty by retrieving treasures or lovers for their feudal lords (e.g. Kunlun Nu). The famous Tang poet Li Bai, a skilled swordsman himself, wrote a yuefu poem Ode to Gallantry (俠客行) to praise the chivalrous romance of such heroes. Tales of xia who excels in martial prowess have inspired an entire genre of Chinese literature called wuxia (武俠, lit. "martial hero"), while tales of those who mastered magical skills or have cultivated supernatural abilities are called xianxia (仙俠, lit. "immortal/saintly hero").

In Japan, musha shugyō is a similar concept featuring a quest or pilgrimage of a samurai who wants to test his abilities in real conditions. In Japanese works, a hero of this kind may leave to travel across the country in a kind of initiatory journey and engage in duels along the way.

== Modern culture ==
- The protagonist of Cormac McCarthy's novel All the Pretty Horses, John Grady Cole, is said to be based specifically on Gawain of Sir Gawain and the Green Knight. Both characters share a number of aspects and traits; both are rooted in the myths of a past that no longer exists, and both live by codes of conduct from a previous era.
- In Jean Giraudoux's play Ondine, which starred Audrey Hepburn on Broadway in 1954, a knight-errant appears, during a storm, at the humble home of a fisherman and his wife.
- The protagonist of Lee Child's novels, Jack Reacher, is intended by the author as a modern-day reflection of classic lone heroes.
- The protagonist of George R. R. Martin's novella Tales of Dunk and Egg, Ser Duncan the Tall, is a knight-errant in the fictional world of A Song of Ice and Fire, where they are called hedge knights.
- Miles Naismith Vorkosigan is the primary protagonist of Lois McMaster Bujold's Vorkosigan Saga, and his mother has called him a "knight-errant" due to his tendencies of recklessly charging into danger to help strangers at great personal risk. One of the omnibus collections is actually named "Miles Errant". His twin clone-brother Mark also has similar tendencies, and their mother thinks he modelled himself on Miles.
- The titular character of Rafael Sabatini's Bellarion the Fortunate likes to think of himself as a rational man, but ends up facing peril and social disdain all to help a woman who hates him, for no personal benefit. His adoptive father says Bellarion's efforts are "sheer knight-errantry", and Bellarion conceded the label may have some truth.

== See also ==
- Byronic hero
- Romantic hero
- Rōnin
- Suero de Quiñones
