= Ira Parker =

Canadian screenwriter and producer

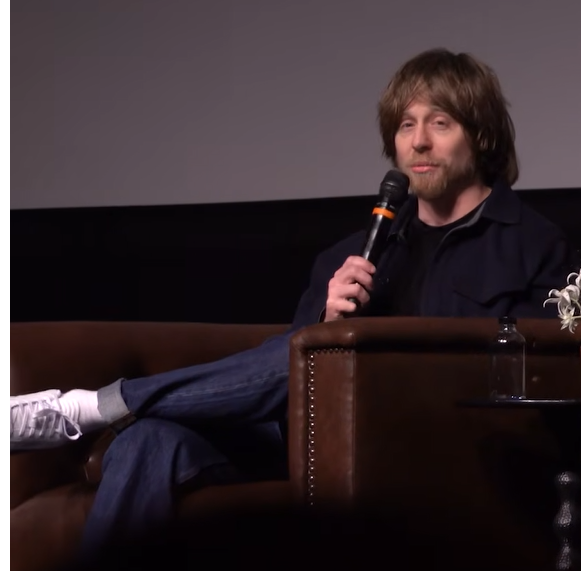
Parker at a panel Q&A for AKOTSK, 2026

Ira Parker is a Canadian screenwriter and producer. He has been producer and showrunner of A Knight of the Seven Kingdoms (2026–). Parker first became involved in the Game of Thrones franchise as a writer and producer on the first season of the House of the Dragon (2022). He also worked on series 3 to 5 of The Last Ship (2016–2018), on series 3 and 4 of Better Things (2019–2020), and on part two of The Nevers (2023). He created and wrote Four in the Morning (2016).

== Early life and education ==
Parker was born in Niagara Falls, Ontario, Canada. He was brought up in St. Catharines, Ontario, where his father had a cleaning products business. He studied for a Bachelor of Commerce (BCom) degree at the University of Toronto. He left Canada for California, United States, where he undertook a Master of Fine Arts (MFA) degree in screenwriting at Chapman College.

== Filmography ==
=== Television ===
Year	Title	Creator	Director	Writer	Producer	Notes
2014–2016	Rogue	No	No	Yes	Yes	Co-producer, story editor, writer
2015	The Pinkertons	No	No	Yes	No	Episode 7
2016–2018	The Last Ship	No	No	Yes	Yes	Writer, producer, supervising producer (season 5)
2016	Four in the Morning	Yes	No	Yes	Yes	Creator, showrunner, writer
2019–2020	Better Things	No	No	Yes	Yes	Co-executive producer
2022	House of the Dragon	No	No	Yes	Yes	Co-executive producer (season 1), writer (S1E4)
2023	The Nevers	No	No	Yes	Yes	Co-executive producer (part 2), writer (S1E8)
2024	The Sympathizer	No	No	No	Yes	Consulting producer
2026–present	A Knight of the Seven Kingdoms	Yes	No	Yes	Yes	Co-creator with George R. R. Martin
