= Dexter Sol Ansell =

British child actor

- Born: 16 September 2014 (age 12)
- Other name: Dexter Ansell
- Occupation: Actor
- Years active: 2016–present
- Parents: Jonathan Ansell (father); Debbie King (mother)

Dexter Sol Ansell (born 16 September 2014) is an English child actor. He is known for his role as Aegon "Egg" Targaryen in the HBO series A Knight of the Seven Kingdoms (2026–present).

== Early life ==
From Leeds, West Yorkshire, Ansell is the son of former Quizmania host Debbie (née King) and pop-opera group G4 singer Jonathan Ansell. He has one older sister.

== Career ==
Ansell began acting in the British soap opera Emmerdale playing the role of Jimmy King's son Carl Holliday between January and May 2016. He returned to Emmerdale in June 2019, playing Dawn Taylor's son Lucas Taylor, which he continued to play until March 2021.

In 2023, Ansell played the role of young Coriolanus Snow in The Hunger Games: The Ballad of Songbirds & Snakes. He appeared in the series The Midwich Cuckoos, the sitcom Hullraisers on Channel 4, and the 2023 horror film The Moor. He also appeared in the Netflix film Christmas on Mistletoe Farm. His projects include the Robert Zemeckis film Here, and as Little Dan in the Sky Cinema family comedy film Robin and the Hoods.

In April 2024, he was cast in the lead role of "Egg" in A Knight of the Seven Kingdoms, written by George R. R. Martin and Ira Parker. It is set between the events of House of the Dragon and Game of Thrones. The series premiered in 2026.

He was cast in the film 500 Miles in October 2024.

== Filmography ==
Key
†	Denotes works that have not yet been released

=== Film ===
Feature film appearances
Year	Title	Role	Notes	Ref.
2022	Christmas on Mistletoe Farm	Buster		
2023	The Hunger Games: The Ballad of Songbirds & Snakes	Young Coriolanus Snow		
2024	The Moor	Danny		
2024	Robin and the Hoods	Little Dan		
2024	Here	Little Boy in Dress		
2026	500 Miles	Charlie		
2027	Naughty		Filming	

=== Television ===
Year	Title	Role	Notes	Ref.
2016	Emmerdale	Carl Holliday		
2019–2021	Emmerdale	Lucas Taylor		
2022	The Midwich Cuckoos	David Saunders	5 episodes	
2023	Hullraisers	Finlay		
2026–present	A Knight of the Seven Kingdoms	Aegon "Egg" Targaryen	Main role; 6 episodes	
