= Peter Claffey =

Irish actor (born 1996)

- Born: 28 July 1996 (age 30); Portumna, County Galway, Ireland
- Education: Bow Street Academy; Garbally College
- Occupations: Actor, former rugby union player
- Years active: 2022–present (acting)
- Known for: A Knight of the Seven Kingdoms; Wreck

Rugby union career
- Position: Lock
Amateur team(s)
Years	Team	Apps	(Points)
2017–2022	Galway Corinthians RFC		
- Buccaneers RFC
2019–2020	Terenure College RFC		
Senior career
Years	Team	Apps	(Points)
2018–2019	Connacht Rugby		
International career
Years	Team	Apps	(Points)
2016	Ireland U20		

Peter Claffey (born 28 July 1996) is an Irish actor. A former professional rugby union player for Connacht Rugby, he retired from the sport in 2019 to pursue acting. He is known for starring as Ser Duncan "Dunk" the Tall in the HBO fantasy series A Knight of the Seven Kingdoms (2026–present). He was named a 2025 Screen International Star of Tomorrow.

== Early life ==
Claffey was born in Portumna, County Galway, Ireland. He attended Garbally College in Ballinasloe, a school renowned for its rugby tradition. Although he became a physically imposing athlete—growing to 6 ft 5 in (1.96 m)—Claffey has described himself as a "nerd" who was bullied for being "uncoordinated" and "wobbly" during his childhood. He focused on rugby as a teenager, noting that in his hometown "you were either cool by getting loads of women or by being really good at sports," and he "opted for the latter".

== Career ==
=== Rugby union ===
Claffey played as a lock forward. He played his club rugby for Galwegians RFC and Buccaneers RFC before his physical potential led to his recruitment into the Connacht Rugby academy in 2015.

He represented the Ireland Under-20s during the 2016 Six Nations Under 20s Championship, appearing in matches against France and England. In 2018, he signed a professional contract with Connacht ahead of the 2018–19 season. However, he found the professional environment isolating and struggled to break into the senior team, ultimately making zero competitive appearances for the province before being released in 2019.

Claffey later admitted that he did not leave the sport due to injury, but because he "didn't have the heart for it" and felt he "wasn't good enough" to compete at the highest level. He briefly played All-Ireland League rugby for Terenure College RFC in Dublin while beginning his transition into the arts.

=== Acting ===
Following his departure from professional sport, Claffey began posting comedy sketches on Instagram and enrolled at the Bow Street Academy for Screen Acting in Dublin, graduating their one-year course in 2020. He has cited fellow Irishman Cillian Murphy as a major influence, particularly admiring Murphy's focus and "care for the craft" while working with him as a minor character on the set of Small Things Like These (2024).

Claffey made his professional stage debut in 2022 playing Iggy in Tom Murphy's A Whistle in the Dark at the Abbey Theatre. His early television credits included the Apple TV+ series Bad Sisters, where he played the minor role of Callum in Series 1 (2022). Unusually, he returned to the show in Series 2 (2024) to play a completely different, recurring character named Joe Walsh, a love interest for Becka Garvey (played by Eve Hewson). From 2022 to 2024, he starred as Cormac Kelly in the BBC Three horror-comedy series Wreck.

In April 2024, it was announced that Claffey had been cast in the lead role of Ser Duncan the Tall in the Game of Thrones prequel series A Knight of the Seven Kingdoms. The showrunners sought an actor "over 6-foot-5" who possessed a "gentle demeanor," eventually selecting Claffey over hundreds of candidates. The series premiered in January 2026. Claffey received critical acclaim for his performance, with reviews highlighting his physical presence and on-screen chemistry with co-star Dexter Sol Ansell (who played Egg). In addition, critics noted that his portrayal balanced the character's imposing physicality with a restrained emotional depth, helping to anchor the series' more intimate tone.

== Filmography ==
Key
†	Denotes works that have not yet been released

=== Film ===
Year	Title	Role	Notes
2024	Small Things like These	Barry	
TBA	You'll Never Believe Who's Dead †	TBA	Post-production

=== Television ===
Year	Title	Role	Notes
2022	Harry Wild	Billy	Episode: "An Unhappy Happy is a Dangerous Thing"
2022; 2024	Bad Sisters	Callum	Series 1; episode: "Explode a Man"
2022; 2024	Bad Sisters	Joe Walsh	Series 2; recurring role
2022–2024	Wreck	Cormac Kelly	Main role; 12 episodes
2024	Vikings: Valhalla	Dunstan	4 episodes
2024	Borderline	Conor Byrne	2 episodes
2026–present	A Knight of the Seven Kingdoms	Ser Duncan "Dunk" the Tall	Lead role; 6 episodes
