= List of awards and nominations received by True Detective =

True Detective awards and nominations
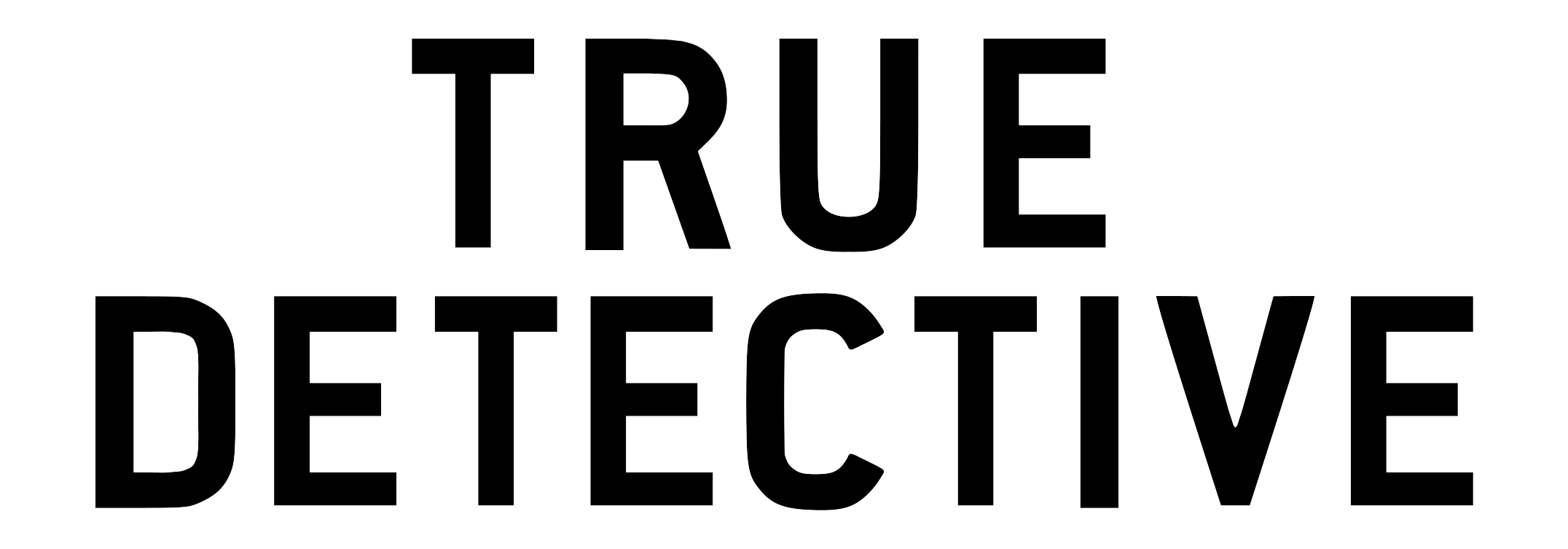
Awards and nominations
Award	Wins	Nominations
ADG Excellence in Production Design Awards	1	1
American Cinema Editors Awards	1	2
Artios Awards	1	2
Astra TV Awards	0	7
British Academy Television Awards	1	2
British Academy Television Craft Awards	0	1
Cinema Audio Society Awards	0	1
Costume Designers Guild Awards	0	1
Crime Thriller Awards	1	1
Critics' Choice Television Awards	1	6
Directors Guild of America Awards	0	2
Dorian Awards	0	1
Golden Globe Awards	1	7
Golden Reel Awards	0	2
Humanitas Prize	0	1
Make-Up Artists & Hair Stylists Guild Awards	0	4
NAACP Image Awards	0	1
Online Film & Television Association Awards	2	5
People's Choice Awards	0	1
Primetime Emmy Awards	6	39
Producers Guild of America Awards	0	3
Satellite Awards	0	4
Screen Actors Guild Awards	0	4
Society of Camera Operators Awards	1	1
SXSW Film Festival	2	2
Television Critics Association Awards	2	6
Writers Guild of America Awards	2	4

Totals (Note: Certain award groups do not simply award one winner. They acknowledge several different recipients, have runners-up, and have third place. Since this is a specific recognition and is different from losing an award, runner-up mentions are considered wins in this award tally. For simplification and to avoid errors, each award in this list has been presumed to have had a prior nomination.)
- Wins: 25
- Nominations: 82

True Detective is an American crime drama television series that premiered on January 12, 2014, on the HBO network. It was created and written by Nic Pizzolatto. Conceived as an anthology, each season will be engineered as a disparate, self-contained narrative, employing new cast ensembles and following various sets of characters and settings.

True Detective was a candidate for television awards in a variety of categories recognizing its writing, acting, production, and direction. The show received eleven Primetime Emmy nominations heading into the 2014 Emmy season, scooping up five wins, among them being Outstanding Directing for a Drama Series for Cary Joji Fukunaga. At the 72nd Golden Globe Awards, the show scored three Golden Globe nominations, including Best Actor in a Miniseries or Television Film for Matthew McConaughey and Woody Harrelson and Best Supporting Actress in a Miniseries or Television Film for Michelle Monaghan. Other substantial nominations include four TCA Awards (two wins), three Satellite Awards, and a BAFTA (one win).

McConaughey is the most decorated of the show's actors, with ten nominations. Pizzolatto earned two Writers Guild of America Awards (WGAs) for his work as a writer for the series. To date, True Detective has been nominated for 37 awards and has won 24.

== Astra TV Awards ==
The Astra TV Awards, presented annually by the Hollywood Creative Alliance (HCA), a non-profit organization of critics, entertainment journalists, content creators, industry influencers, and creatives. True Detective has received seven nominations.

Year	Category	Nominee(s)	Result	Ref.
2024	Best Limited Series	True Detective: Night Country	Nominated	
2024	Best Actress in a Limited Series or TV Movie	Jodie Foster	Nominated	
2024	Best Supporting Actor in a Limited Series or TV Movie	Finn Bennett	Nominated	
2024	Best Supporting Actor in a Limited Series or TV Movie	Christopher Eccleston	Nominated	
2024	Best Supporting Actress in a Limited Series or TV Movie	Kali Reis	Nominated	
2024	Best Directing in a Limited Series or TV Movie	Issa López	Nominated	
2024	Best Writing in a Limited Series or TV Movie	Issa López	Nominated	

== BAFTA TV Awards ==
The British Academy Television Awards, presented annually by the British Academy of Film and Television Arts (BAFTA), recognize distinguished artistic achievement in British television. The branch of awards recognizing technical and production-based work (such as cinematography, editing, and music) are designated as British Academy Television Craft Awards. True Detective has won one award.

=== British Academy Television Awards ===
Year	Category	Nominee(s)	Result	Ref.
2015	Best International Programme	Nic Pizzolatto, Cary Joji Fukunaga, Scott Stephens, and Steve Golin	Won	
2025	Best International Programme	Production Team	Nominated	

=== British Academy Television Craft Awards ===
Year	Category	Nominee(s)	Result	Ref.
2025	Best Sound: Fiction	Howard Bargroff, Stephen Griffiths, Tom Jenkins, Andy Shelley, Mark Timms, and Michele Woods	Nominated	

== Black Reel Awards ==
The Black Reel Awards are presented by the Foundation for the Augmentation of African-Americans in Film (FAAAF) to recognize excellence of African Americans, as well as the cinematic achievements of the African diaspora, in the global film and television industry.

Year	Category	Nominee(s)	Result	Ref.
2024	Outstanding Television Movie or Limited Series	True Detective: Night Country	Nominated	
2024	Outstanding Supporting Performance in a TV Movie/Limited Series	Kali Reis	Nominated	

== Critics' Choice Television Awards ==
The Critics' Choice Television Awards is an annual accolade bestowed by the Broadcast Television Journalists Association in recognition of outstanding achievements in television, since 2011. True Detective has received one award from four nominations.

Year	Category	Nominee(s)	Result	Ref.
2014	Best Drama Series	True Detective	Nominated	
2014	Best Actor in a Drama Series	Matthew McConaughey	Won	
2015	Best Actress in a Movie/Limited Series	Rachel McAdams	Nominated	
2019	Best Actor in a Movie/Limited Series	Mahershala Ali	Nominated	
2025	Best Actress in a Limited Series or Movie Made for Television	Jodie Foster	Nominated	
2025	Best Supporting Actress in a Limited Series or Movie Made for Television	Kali Reis	Nominated	

== Directors Guild of America Awards ==
The Directors Guild of America Awards are presented annually to directors to acknowledge their artistic and technical achievements in American entertainment. Winners are chosen jointly by the Directors Guild of America. True Detective has received two nominations.

Year	Category	Nominee(s)	Result	Ref.
2014	Outstanding Directorial Achievement in Dramatic Series	Cary Joji Fukunaga (for "Who Goes There")	Nominated	
2024	Outstanding Directorial Achievement in Dramatic Series	Issa López (for "Part 6")	Nominated	

== Emmy Awards ==
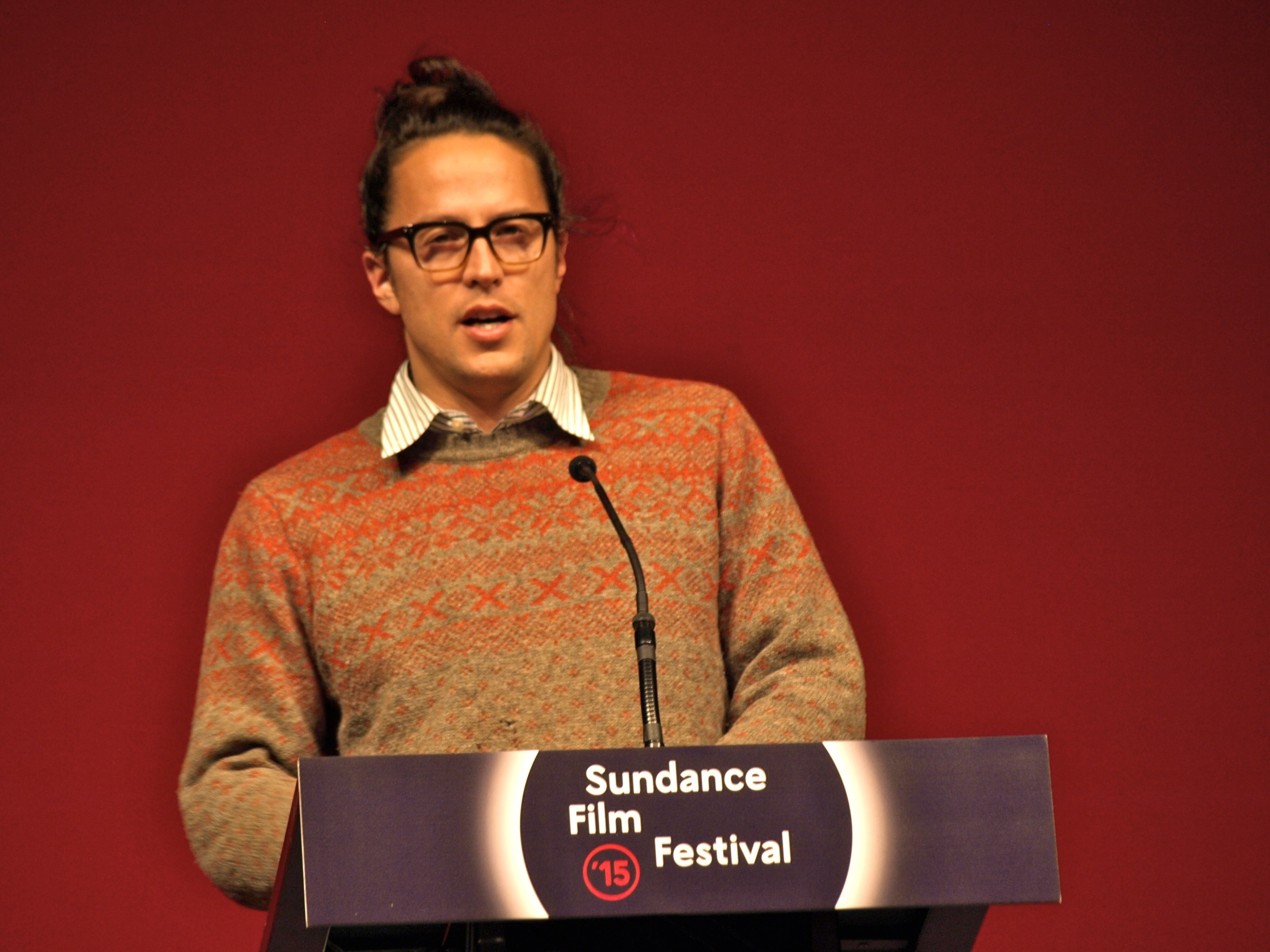
In 2014, Cary Fukunaga won the Primetime Emmy Award for Outstanding Directing for a Drama Series.

The Primetime Emmy Awards are awarded annually by members of the Academy of Television Arts & Sciences for excellence and outstanding achievements in American primetime television. The branch of awards recognizing technical and production-based work (such as cinematography, editing, and music) are designated as Creative Arts Emmy Awards. True Detective has received six awards from forty-one nominations.

=== Primetime Emmy Awards ===
Year	Category	Nominee(s)	Result	Ref.
2014	Outstanding Drama Series	Nic Pizzolatto, Cary Joji Fukunaga, Scott Stephens, Steve Golin, Woody Harrelson, Matthew McConaughey, Richard Brown, and Carol Cuddy	Nominated	
2014	Outstanding Lead Actor in a Drama Series	Woody Harrelson	Nominated	
2014	Outstanding Lead Actor in a Drama Series	Matthew McConaughey	Nominated	
2014	Outstanding Directing for a Drama Series	Cary Joji Fukunaga (for "Who Goes There")	Won	
2014	Outstanding Writing for a Drama Series	Nic Pizzolatto (for "The Secret Fate of All Life")	Nominated	
2019	Outstanding Lead Actor in a Limited Series or Movie	Mahershala Ali	Nominated	
2024	Outstanding Limited or Anthology Series	Issa López, Mari Jo Winkler-Ioffreda, Jodie Foster, Barry Jenkins, Adele Romanski, Mark Ceryak, Chris Mundy, Nic Pizzolatto, Matthew McConaughey, Woody Harrelson, Steve Golin, Richard Brown, Cary Joji Fukunaga, Alan Page Arriaga, Princess Daazhraii Johnson, Cathy Tagnak Rexford, Layla Blackman, and Sam Breckman	Nominated	
2024	Outstanding Lead Actress in a Limited or Anthology Series or Movie	Jodie Foster	Won	
2024	Outstanding Supporting Actor in a Limited or Anthology Series or Movie	John Hawkes	Nominated	
2024	Outstanding Supporting Actress in a Limited or Anthology Series or Movie	Kali Reis	Nominated	
2024	Outstanding Directing for a Limited or Anthology Series or Movie	Issa López	Nominated	
2024	Outstanding Writing for a Limited or Anthology Series or Movie	Issa López (for "Part 6")	Nominated	

=== Primetime Creative Arts Emmy Awards ===
Year	Category	Nominee(s)	Result	Ref.
2014	Outstanding Art Direction for a Contemporary or Fantasy Series (Single-Camera)	Alex DiGerlando, Mara LePere-Schloop, Tim Beach, and Cynthia Slagter (for "Form and Void")	Nominated	
2014	Outstanding Casting for a Drama Series	Alexa L. Fogel, Christine Kromer, and Meagan Lewis	Won	
2014	Outstanding Cinematography for a Single-Camera Series	Adam Arkapaw (for "Who Goes There")	Won	
2014	Outstanding Main Title Design	Patrick Clair, Raoul Marks, and Jennifer Sofio Hall	Won	
2014	Outstanding Makeup for a Single-Camera Series (Non-Prosthetic)	Felicity Bowring, Wendy Bell, Ann Pala, Kim Perrodin, and Linda Dowds (for "The Secret Fate of All Life")	Won	
2014	Outstanding Music Composition for a Series (Original Dramatic Score)	T Bone Burnett (for "Form and Void")	Nominated	
2014	Outstanding Single-Camera Picture Editing for a Drama Series	Affonso Gonçalves (for "Who Goes There")	Nominated	
2016	Outstanding Sound Mixing for a Limited Series or Movie	Daniel J. Leahy, Steve Pederson, Geoffrey Patterson, and Ron Bedrosian (for "Down Will Come")	Nominated	
2019	Outstanding Cinematography for a Limited Series or Movie	Germain McMicking (for "The Great War and Modern Memory")	Nominated	
2019	Outstanding Hairstyling for a Limited Series or Movie	Brian B. Badie, Andrea Mona Bowman, and Lawrence Cornell Davis	Nominated	
2019	Outstanding Main Title Design	Patrick Clair, Nic Pizzolatto, Raoul Marks, Woosung Kang, Kyle Moore, and Victor Joy	Nominated	
2019	Outstanding Makeup for a Limited Series or Movie (Non-Prosthetic)	John Blake, Francisco X. Perez, and Debi Young	Nominated	
2019	Outstanding Music Composition for a Limited Series, Movie or Special (Original Dramatic Score)	T Bone Burnett and Keefus Ciancia (for "The Final Country")	Nominated	
2019	Outstanding Single-Camera Picture Editing for a Limited Series or Movie	Leo Trombetta (for "If You Have Ghosts")	Nominated	
2019	Outstanding Sound Editing for a Limited Series, Movie, or Special	Mandell Winter, David Esparza, Micah Loken, Bernard Weiser, Ryan Collins, Fernand Bos, Jason Wormer, Eryne Prine, Sarah Monat, and Robin Harlan (for "The Great War and Modern Memory")	Nominated	
2019	Outstanding Sound Mixing for a Limited Series or Movie	Tateum Kohut, Greg Orloff, Geoffrey Patterson, and Biff Dawes (for "The Great War and Modern Memory")	Nominated	
2024	Outstanding Casting for a Limited or Anthology Series or Movie	Francine Maisler, Deborah Schildt, and Alda B. Gudjónsdóttir	Nominated	
2024	Outstanding Cinematography for a Limited or Anthology Series or Movie	Florian Hoffmeister (for "Part 6")	Nominated	
2024	Outstanding Contemporary Costumes for a Limited or Anthology Series or Movie	Alex Bovaird, Linda Gardar, Rebekka Jónsdóttir, Tina Ulee, Giulia Moschioni, and Brian Sprouse (for "Part 5")	Nominated	
2024	Outstanding Contemporary Makeup (Non-Prosthetic)	Peter Swords King, Natalie Abizadeh, Kerry Skelton, Flóra Karítas Buenaño, and Hafdís Pálsdóttir (for "Part 5")	Nominated	
2024	Outstanding Prosthetic Makeup	Dave Elsey, Lou Elsey, and Brian Kinney (for "Part 3")	Nominated	
2024	Outstanding Original Music and Lyrics	"No Use" (for "Part 5"); Music and Lyrics by John Hawkes	Nominated	
2024	Outstanding Music Supervision	Susan Jacobs (for "Part 4")	Nominated	
2024	Outstanding Picture Editing for a Limited or Anthology Series or Movie	Matt Chessé (for "Part 4")	Nominated	
2024	Outstanding Picture Editing for a Limited or Anthology Series or Movie	Brenna Rangott (for "Part 6")	Nominated	
2024	Outstanding Production Design for a Narrative Contemporary Program (One Hour or More)	Daniel Taylor, Jo Riddell, and Charlotte Dirickx	Nominated	
2024	Outstanding Sound Editing for a Limited or Anthology Series, Movie or Special	Martín Hernández, Stephen Griffiths, Tom Jenkins, Michele Woods, Andy Shelley, Jake Fielding, Stuart Bagshaw, Barnaby Smyth, Rebecca Glover, and Ben Smithers (for "Part 6")	Nominated	
2024	Outstanding Sound Mixing for a Limited or Anthology Series or Movie	Howard Bargroff, Mark Timms, Skúli Helgi Sigurgíslason, and Keith Partridge (for "Part 6")	Nominated	
2024	Outstanding Special Visual Effects in a Single Episode	Barney Curnow, Jan Guilfoyle, Eggert "Eddi" Ketilsson, Simon Stanley-Clamp, Manuel Reyes Halaby, Tiago Faria, Panos Theodoropoulos, Cale Pugh, and Tim Zaccheo (for "Part 1")	Nominated	

== Golden Globe Awards ==
Awarded since 1944, the Golden Globe Awards is an annual accolade bestowed by members of the Hollywood Foreign Press Association honoring outstanding achievements in television and film. True Detective won once and received seven nominations.

Year	Category	Nominee(s)	Result	Ref.
2014	Best Miniseries or Television Film	True Detective	Nominated	
2014	Best Actor – Miniseries or Television Film	Woody Harrelson	Nominated	
2014	Best Actor – Miniseries or Television Film	Matthew McConaughey	Nominated	
2014	Best Supporting Actress – Series, Miniseries, or Television Film	Michelle Monaghan	Nominated	
2024	Best Miniseries or Television Film	True Detective: Night Country	Nominated	
2024	Best Actress – Miniseries or Television Film	Jodie Foster	Won	
2024	Best Supporting Actress – Series, Miniseries, or Television Film	Kali Reis	Nominated	

== Producers Guild of America Awards ==
The Producers Guild of America Awards were created in 1990 by the Producers Guild of America to acknowledge the contributions of film and television producers in American entertainment. True Detective has been nominated once.

Year	Category	Nominee(s)	Result	Ref.
2014	Norman Felton Award for Outstanding Producer of Episodic Television – Drama	Richard Brown, Carol Cuddy, Steve Golin, Woody Harrelson, Cary Joji Fukunaga, Matthew McConaughey, Nic Pizzolatto, and Scott Stephens	Nominated	
2019	David L. Wolper Award for Outstanding Producer of Limited Series Television	Nic Pizzolatto, Scott Stephens, Daniel Sackheim, Peter Feldman, Steve Golin, and Bard Dorros	Nominated	
2024	David L. Wolper Award for Outstanding Producer of Limited Series Television	Issa López, Mari Jo Winkler-Ioffreda, Jodie Foster, Barry Jenkins, Adele Romanski, Mark Ceryak, Chris Mundy, Sam Breckman, Alan Page Arriaga, Princess Daazhraii Johnson, Cathy Tagnak Rexford, and Layla Blackman	Nominated	

== Satellite Awards ==
The Satellite Awards are the International Press Academy's annual entertainment awards, since 1997. True Detective has been nominated for four awards.

Year	Category	Nominee(s)	Result	Ref.
2014	Best Drama Series	True Detective	Nominated	
2014	Best Actor in a Drama Series	Woody Harrelson	Nominated	
2014	Best Supporting Actress in a Series, Miniseries, or Television Film	Michelle Monaghan	Nominated	
2024	Best Actress in a Miniseries, Limited Series, or Motion Picture Made for Television	Jodie Foster	Nominated	

== Screen Actors Guild Awards ==
Presented since 1995, the Screen Actors Guild Awards is an annual accolade honoring excellence and outstanding achievement in television acting. Winners are chosen by members of the Screen Actors Guild. True Detective has been nominated four times.

Year	Category	Nominee(s)	Result	Ref.
2014	Outstanding Performance by a Male Actor in a Drama Series	Woody Harrelson	Nominated	
2014	Outstanding Performance by a Male Actor in a Drama Series	Matthew McConaughey	Nominated	
2019	Outstanding Performance by a Male Actor in a Miniseries or Television Movie	Mahershala Ali	Nominated	
2024	Outstanding Performance by a Female Actor in a Miniseries or Television Movie	Jodie Foster	Nominated	

== Television Critics Association Awards ==
The TCA Awards are distributed by the Television Critics Association in recognition of distinguished artistic contribution in the television industry. True Detective has won two awards from four nominations.

Year	Category	Nominee(s)	Result	Ref.
2014	Program of the Year	True Detective	Nominated	
2014	Outstanding New Program	True Detective	Nominated	
2014	Outstanding Achievement in Movies, Miniseries, and Specials	True Detective	Won	
2014	Individual Achievement in Drama	Matthew McConaughey	Won	
2024	Outstanding Achievement in Drama	True Detective: Night Country	Nominated	
2024	Individual Achievement in Drama	Jodie Foster	Nominated	

== Writers Guild of America Awards ==
The Writers Guild of America Awards are presented annually to writers to acknowledge their artistic and technical achievements in American entertainment. Winners are chosen jointly by the Writers Guild of America, East and the Writers Guild of America, West. True Detective has won two awards.

Year	Category	Nominee(s)	Result	Ref.
2014	Dramatic Series	Nic Pizzolatto	Won	
2014	New Series	Nic Pizzolatto	Won	
2019	Long Form – Original	Alessandra DiMona, Graham Gordy, Gabriel Hobson, David Milch, and Nic Pizzolatto	Nominated	
2024	Limited Series	Katrina Albright, Alan Page Arriaga, Namsi Khan, Issa López, Chris Mundy, and Wenonah Wilms	Nominated	
