= Part 2 (True Detective) =

- True Detective episode
- Episode no.: Season 4 Episode 2
- Directed by: Issa López
- Written by: Issa López
- Cinematography by: Florian Hoffmeister
- Editing by: Mags Arnold
- Original air date: January 21, 2024
- Running time: 62 minutes

Guest appearances
- L'xeis Diane Benson as Bee; Aka Niviâna as Julia Navarro

Episode chronology
← Previous "Part 1"	Next → "Part 3"
- True Detective (season 4)

"Part 2", also known as "Night Country, Part 2", is the second episode of the fourth season of the American anthology crime drama television series True Detective. It is the 26th overall episode of the series and was written and directed by executive producer Issa López. It was first broadcast on HBO in the United States on January 21, 2024, and also was available on Max on the same date.

The season takes place in Ennis, Alaska, and follows detectives Liz Danvers and Evangeline Navarro as they investigate the disappearance of eight men who operate the Tsalal Arctic Research Station and vanish without a trace. While occasionally working together, Danvers and Navarro are not on good terms after an unresolved case, which was very personal for Navarro. In the episode, Danvers and Navarro start investigating the corpses found at the lake.

According to Nielsen Media Research, the episode was seen by an estimated 0.678 million household viewers and gained a 0.09 ratings share among adults aged 18–49. The episode received critical acclaim, with critics praising the performances, directing, atmosphere and character development. Some analyzed the connections to the first season.

== Plot ==
As authorities check on the corpses, Danvers (Jodie Foster) discovers that the bodies were stripped naked with burnt eyes, self-inflicted bite marks, ruptured ear drums, and other strange injuries. She also notices a spiral symbol on a forehead but does not understand what it means. As they try to remove the corpses from the ice, one of the officers accidentally breaks an arm completely off one of the bodies. To the group's horror, they realize that body is not a corpse when he suddenly wails out in pain.

While the survivor is taken to the hospital, Danvers visits her friend Bryce to ask him about the Tsalal crew. He states that they were reserved and were trying to sequence the DNA of an extinct micro-organism that could stop cellular deterioration and find a cure for many diseases. Danvers prevents Captain Ted Connelly (Christopher Eccleston) from passing the case to Anchorage, much to his chagrin. Navarro (Kali Reis) visits Rose (Fiona Shaw) to question her about seeing Travis Cohle, the father of Rust Cohle. She in return opens up about the "ghosts" that Julia has been seeing, which included their dead mother. Before Navarro leaves, Rose questions her about the spiral, something that Navarro has seen before. Rose claims that the spiral is not only older than Ennis, but it might be older than the ice itself.

On Danvers' instructions, the "corpsicle" is relocated to an ice rink to ease the process of unfreezing. She and Peter (Finn Bennett) debate on the discovery, as their clothes were carefully placed together near their corpses. They question various acquaintances of the scientists, all of whom describe them as very reserved but uncooperative with people on the outside. In particular, Clark was deemed to be a very strange person, with a local seeing him with the spiral marked on his chest as he walked naked through town. Peter tells Danvers that a non-governmental organization funds Tsalal, and the investors point to a shell corporation named NC Global Strategies, which is owned by Tuttle United. (Note: This refers to the Tuttle family, previously seen in the first season.) She assigns him to retrieve Clark's credit records, although Peter is struck and scolded by Hank (John Hawkes) over stealing Anne's file from their house.

It is revealed that Danvers is having an affair with Connelly, despite their animosity. She tells him that after 19 years, their dalliances must end. Connelly says he must pass the case to Anchorage, as he does not believe Danvers can handle it, and she furiously leaves when he appears to threaten her. She visits Navarro at her house, telling her that Clark got the spiral design from Anne. She asks Navarro for her help, due to her knowledge of the case. Leah (Isabella Star LaBlanc) runs away from the house and joins Peter in watching over the thawing bodies, where they talk about their parents. While visiting Qavvik (Joel D. Montgrand), Navarro realizes the purpose of an RV that belonged to Clark. She finds Clark's abandoned RV and calls Danvers to join her. They find that the RV contains animal bones, Anne's phone, and a shrine devoted to Anne. They go back to the ice rink to discover that there are only six bodies, and Navarro deduces that Clark is still alive.

== Production ==
=== Development ===
The episode was written and directed by executive producer Issa López, marking her second writing and directing credit.

=== Writing ===
López expressed challenges in depicting the "corpsicle" in the episode. She said, "Me as the filmmaker thought if we don't manage to do this, I have to rewrite this, because if we fail with the corpsicle, there's no series. It is so center. It's the MacGuffin of the series." She inspired the concept on the rat king, Gustave Doré's illustrations for Dante's Inferno, and mummies that she saw in Mexico. Jodie Foster said, "The first day, you really can't believe [what you're seeing]. But by the next day, it's just an old shoe, sitting off in the corner. We're just hanging out, drinking coffee around the Corpsicle. After a while, it really didn't mean much."

=== Filming ===
For the sex scene between Danvers and Connelly, Christopher Eccleston explained that it became easier to shoot it after he "leant on a rehearsal table and it smashed in two and I fell on my back which made Issa and Jodie hysterical with laughter." He said this gave them the "shorthand because we realized we had exactly the same sense of humor and same approach – You know, take the work seriously, but don't take yourself seriously at all which really helps in a sex scene."

== Reception ==
=== Viewers ===
The episode was watched by 0.678 million viewers, earning a 0.09 in the 18–49 rating demographics on the Nielsen Media Research ratings scale. This means that 0.09 percent of all households with televisions watched the episode. This was a 20% increase from the previous episode, which was watched by 0.565 million viewers with a 0.08 in the 18–49 demographics.

=== Critical reviews ===
"Part 2" received critical acclaim. The review aggregator website Rotten Tomatoes reported an 94% approval rating for the episode, based on 16 reviews. The site's consensus states: "Night Country's mysteries begin to thaw like the sickening tableau at the center of this second episode, which begins the investigation in terrifying earnest."

Christina Izzo of The A.V. Club gave the episode an "A" grade and wrote, "The second episode had already unsettlingly plunged viewers even deeper into the mysterious world of Ennis and the lives and regrets of its troubled inhabitants. But it's a whole other thing to have one of said inhabitants roaming around the tundra nude and newly thawed from a human iceberg. Let the creepiness continue."

Alan Sepinwall of Rolling Stone wrote, "Developments this week, like the tongue on the Tsalal floor being Annie's, forces Danvers and Navarro to reluctantly team up again. This means we're eventually going to find out the full extent of their beef, but it also means that we're heading for a collision between them, and perhaps within Night Country itself, about how much, if any, of what's happening in this case has a rational explanation, and how much is just Ennis, man." Ben Travers of IndieWire gave the episode a "B" grade and wrote, "We already knew it wasn't just about Annie K. Now, at least, we have a name. And sometimes that's the only clue you need."

Erik Kain of Forbes wrote, "So far, I remain unimpressed. The setting is cool. The endless dark is surprisingly effective and even two episodes in, I find the atmosphere quite suffocating and oppressive. If only the rest of the production lived up to the setting but there's something off about all of it, from the opening credits to the cinematography. It feels cheaper than previous seasons. Despite all the obvious connections to Season 1, it just lacks the aesthetic and feel that the first season achieved." Coleman Spilde of The Daily Beast wrote, "It seems like an easy lead suspect, but given all of the surreal, occult-like twists and turns in just the first two episodes alone, nothing about what comes next will be simple."

Amanda Whiting of Vulture gave the episode a 4 star rating out of 5 and wrote, "Night Country's second chapter is just as much about establishing the series' thematic fault lines as it is about the scattered search for leads. There's Liz, the small-town police chief, versus Connelly, the captain who wants big-city cops in Anchorage to take over the case from here. There are the resentful miners whose labor props up Ennis versus the hard-done. And, with chilling insistence, there's the vanishing line between the living and the dead." Melody McCune of Telltale TV gave the episode a 3.5 star rating out of 5 and wrote, "True Detective: Night Country chugs forward in 'Part 2,' for better or worse. While the pacing suffers somewhat as the series endeavors to juggle several plotlines, the facets that make this season captivating remain. It's a character-driven drama that, when it leans into its innate genre aspects, digs deep into how trauma reshapes us and how the darkest parts of ourselves can't stay hidden, even in semi-permanent night."

Scott Tobias of The New York Times wrote, "What's clear now, after the dreamlike abstractions of the premiere, is that “Night Country” has an investigative path forward. That may strip the show of mystique, but it's worth the added suspense." Tyler Johnson of TV Fanatic gave the episode a 4.3 star rating out of 5 and wrote, "Thus far, True Detective Season 4 has kept us entertained - and a smidge mystified - but we're growing a little skeptical of this show's ability to close this case."
