= Primetime Emmy Award for Outstanding Picture Editing for a Limited or Anthology Series or Movie =

Television award category

Primetime Emmy Award for Picture Editing for a Limited or Anthology Series or Movie
- Awarded for: Outstanding Picture Editing for a Limited or Anthology Series or Movie
- Country: United States
- Presented by: Academy of Television Arts & Sciences
- Currently held by: DTF St. Louis (2026)
- Website: emmys.com

This is a list of winners and nominees of the Primetime Emmy Award for Outstanding Picture Editing for a Limited or Anthology Series or Movie.

In the following list, the first titles listed in gold are the winners; those not in gold are nominees, which are listed in alphabetical order. The years given are those in which the ceremonies took place:

== Winners and nominations ==
=== 1970s ===
| Year | Program | Episode | Nominees | Network |
|---|---|---|---|---|
1970 (22nd)
| 1970 (22nd) | My Sweet Charlie | | Edward M. Abroms | NBC |
| 1970 (22nd) | The Bob Hope Christmas Special | | Anthony Carras, Jim Henrikson, Igo Kantor, Frank McKelvey and Stan Siegel | NBC |
| 1970 (22nd) | Marcus Welby, M.D. | | Gene Fowler Jr. | ABC |
1971 (23rd)
| 1971 (23rd) | Longstreet | | George Nicholson | ABC |
| 1971 (23rd) | The Neon Ceiling | | Robert F. Shugrue | NBC |
| 1971 (23rd) | Vanished | | Robert Watts | NBC |
1972 (24th)
| 1972 (24th) | Brian's Song | | Bud S. Isaacs | ABC |
| 1972 (24th) | The Glass House | | Gene Fowler Jr. | CBS |
| 1972 (24th) | The Snow Goose | | Ken Pearce | NBC |
1973 (25th)
| 1973 (25th) | Surrender at Appomattox: Appointment with Destiny | | Peter C. Johnson and Ed Spiegel | CBS |
| 1973 (25th) | Go Ask Alice | | Henry Berman | NBC |
| 1973 (25th) | Liza with a Z | | Alan Heim | NBC |
1974 (26th)
| 1974 (26th) | The Execution of Private Slovik | | Frank Morriss | NBC |
| 1974 (26th) | The Autobiography of Miss Jane Pittman | | Sidney Levin | CBS |
| 1974 (26th) | A Case of Rape | | Richard Bracken | NBC |
1975 (27th)
| 1975 (27th) | The Legend of Lizzie Borden | | John A. Martinelli | ABC |
| 1975 (27th) | QB VII | "Parts 1 & 2" | Byron 'Buzz' Brandt and Irving Rosenblum | ABC |
| 1975 (27th) | Attack on Terror: The FBI vs. the Ku Klux Klan | | Jerry Young | CBS |
1976 (28th)
| 1976 (28th) | Eleanor and Franklin | | Michael Kahn | ABC |
| 1976 (28th) | Babe | | Henry Berman | CBS |
| 1976 (28th) | I Will Fight No More Forever | | Robert K. Lambert | ABC |
| 1976 (28th) | The Night That Panicked America | | Bud S. Isaacs, Tony Radecki and George Jay Nicholson | ABC |
| 1976 (28th) | The Lindbergh Kidnapping Case | | Rita Roland | NBC |
1977 (29th)
| 1977 (29th) | Eleanor and Franklin: The White House Years | | Rita Roland and Michael S. McLean | ABC |
| 1977 (29th) | Helter Skelter | | Byron 'Buzz' Brandt and Bud S. Isaacs | CBS |
| 1977 (29th) | The Loneliest Runner | | John Loeffler | NBC |
| 1977 (29th) | Raid on Entebbe | | Bud S. Isaacs, Art Seid and Nick Archer | NBC |
| 1977 (29th) | 21 Hours at Munich | | Ronald J. Fagan | ABC |
1978 (30th)
| 1978 (30th) | The Defection of Simas Kudirka | | John A. Martinelli | CBS |
| 1978 (30th) | Just a Little Inconvenience | | Bernard J. Small | NBC |
| 1978 (30th) | A Killing Affair | | Ken Zemke | CBS |
| 1978 (30th) | Mary Jane Harper Cried Last Night | | Kenneth R. Koch | CBS |
| 1978 (30th) | To Kill a Cop | | Harry Kaye and Donald R. Rode | NBC |
| 1978 (30th) | Young Joe, the Forgotten Kennedy | | Ronald J. Fagen | ABC |
| 1978 (30th) | Zeigfeld: The Man and His Women | | Les Green | NBC |
1979 (31st)
| 1979 (31st) | The Jericho Mile | | Arthur Schmidt | ABC |
| 1979 (31st) | Centennial | "Only the Rocks Live Forever" | Robert Watts | NBC |
| 1979 (31st) | First, You Cry | | James Galloway | CBS |
| 1979 (31st) | Ike | "Part 3" | John Woodcock, Bill Lenny and Paul Dixon | ABC |
| 1979 (31st) | The Winds of Kitty Hawk | | John A. Martinelli | NBC |

=== 1980s ===
| Year | Program | Episode | Nominees | Network |
|---|---|---|---|---|
1980 (32nd)
| 1980 (32nd) | All Quiet on the Western Front | | Bill Blunden and Alan Pattillo | CBS |
| 1980 (32nd) | Attica | | Paul La Mastra | ABC |
| 1980 (32nd) | Kenny Rogers as The Gambler | | Jerrold L. Ludwig | CBS |
| 1980 (32nd) | The Silent Lovers | | David Newhouse | NBC |
| 1980 (32nd) | S.O.S. Titanic | | John A. Martinelli and Rusty Coppleman | ABC |
| 1980 (32nd) | When Hell Was in Session | | John Woodcock | NBC |
| 1981 (33rd) | Murder in Texas | | John A. Martinelli | NBC |
| 1981 (33rd) | The Best Little Girl in the World | | Barbara Dies and Michael S. McLean | ABC |
| 1981 (33rd) | Bitter Harvest | | Thomas Fries | NBC |
| 1981 (33rd) | Masada | "Part 4" | John Bloom, Edwin F. England and Peter Kirby | ABC |
| 1981 (33rd) | Shōgun | "Part 5" | Donald R. Rode, Benjamin A. Weissman, Jerry Young and Bill Luciano | NBC |
| 1981 (33rd) | A Whale for the Killing | | Michael Eliot and Robert Florio | ABC |
| 1982 (34th) | A Woman Called Golda | | Robert F. Shugrue | Syndicated |
| 1982 (34th) | Inside the Third Reich | | James T. Heckert, Richard Belding and Les Green | ABC |
| 1982 (34th) | Marco Polo | "Part 4" | John A. Martinelli | NBC |
| 1982 (34th) | A Piano for Mrs. Cimino | | Rita Roland | CBS |
| 1983 (35th) | The Thorn Birds | "Part 3" | C. Timothy O'Meara | ABC |
| 1983 (35th) | The Blue and the Gray | "Part 1" | Fred A. Chulack and Bud Friedgen | CBS |
| 1983 (35th) | The Scarlet and the Black | | Benjamin A. Weissman | CBS |
| 1983 (35th) | The Thorn Birds | "Part 1" | Robert F. Shugrue | ABC |
| 1983 (35th) | Who Will Love My Children? | | Jerrold L. Ludwig | ABC |
| 1983 (35th) | The Winds of War | "Into the Maelstrom" | Bernard Gribble, Peter Zinner, John F. Burnett, Jack Tucker, Earle Herdan and Gary L. Smith | ABC |
| 1984 (36th) | A Streetcar Named Desire | | Jerrold L. Ludwig | ABC |
| 1984 (36th) | Dark Mirror | | Bob Bring | ABC |
| 1984 (36th) | The Day After | | William Paul Dornisch and Robert Florio | ABC |
| 1984 (36th) | The Dollmaker | | Rita Roland | ABC |
| 1984 (36th) | George Washington | "Part 3" | Les Green, Donald Douglas, David Wages and Mel Friedman | CBS |
| 1984 (36th) | Something About Amelia | | Jack Harnish | ABC |
| 1985 (37th) | Wallenberg: A Hero's Story | | Paul LaMastra | NBC |
| 1985 (37th) | A.D. | "Part 5" | John A. Martinelli | NBC |
| 1985 (37th) | The Burning Bed | | Richard Fetterman and Michael A. Stevenson | NBC |
| 1985 (37th) | Hollywood Wives | "Part 2" | Fred A. Chulack and Ray Daniels | ABC |
| 1986 (38th) | An Early Frost | | Jerrold L. Ludwig | NBC |
| 1986 (38th) | Death of a Salesman | | David Ray | CBS |
| 1986 (38th) | Kane & Abel | "Part 1" | Mel Friedman, James Galloway and Les Green | CBS |
| 1986 (38th) | Mussolini: The Untold Story | "Part 2" | Ronald J. Fagan, Noelle Imparato and Rod Stephens | NBC |
| 1986 (38th) | North and South | "Part 4" | Michael Eliot and Scott C. Eyler | ABC |
| 1987 (39th) | LBJ: The Early Years | | Steven Cohen | NBC |
| 1987 (39th) | Fresno | "Part 4" | Andrew Chulack | CBS |
| 1987 (39th) | I'll Take Manhattan | "Part 1" | Michael Brown | CBS |
| 1987 (39th) | Murder Ordained | "Part 2" | Michael Eliot | CBS |
| 1987 (39th) | Unnatural Causes | | Paul LaMastra | NBC |
| 1988 (40th) | The Murder of Mary Phagan | | John A. Martinelli | NBC |
| 1988 (40th) | The Attic: The Hiding of Anne Frank | | Jerrold L. Ludwig | CBS |
| 1988 (40th) | The Bourne Identity | | Benjamin A. Weissman and Ellen Ring Jacobson | ABC |
| 1988 (40th) | Foxfire | | Paul LaMastra | CBS |
| 1988 (40th) | The Taking of Flight 847: The Uli Derickson Story | | James Galloway | NBC |
| 1988 (40th) | To Heal a Nation | | Gregory Prange and Millie Moore | NBC |
| 1989 (41st) | War and Remembrance | "Part 10" | Peter Zinner and John F. Burnett | ABC |
| 1989 (41st) | The Hijacking of the Achille Lauro | | Robert K. Lambert | NBC |
| 1989 (41st) | Lonesome Dove | "The Plains" | Corky Ehlers | CBS |
| 1989 (41st) | My Name Is Bill W. | | Paul Rubell, John Wright | ABC |
| 1989 (41st) | Roe vs. Wade | | Elodie Keene and Joe Ann Fogle | NBC |

=== 1990s ===
| Year | Program | Episode | Nominees | Network |
|---|---|---|---|---|
| 1990 (42nd) | Caroline? | | Paul LaMastra | CBS |
| 1990 (42nd) | Blind Faith | "Part 2" | Christopher Cooke and James Galloway | NBC |
| 1990 (42nd) | Center of Fire: Cousteau's Rediscovery of the World | | Jane Lippman | TBS |
| 1990 (42nd) | A Killing in a Small Town | | Harvey Rosenstock | CBS |
| 1990 (42nd) | The Shell Seekers | | Fred A. Chulack | ABC |
| 1990 (42nd) | The Simpsons | "Simpsons Roasting on an Open Fire" | Brian K. Roberts and Ric Eisman | Fox |
| 1990 (42nd) | Small Sacrifices | "Part 2" | Parkie L. Singh | ABC |
| 1991 (43rd) | Sarah, Plain and Tall | | John Wright | CBS |
| 1991 (43rd) | The Court-Martial of Jackie Robinson | | Eric A. Sears | TNT |
| 1991 (43rd) | Hiroshima: Out of the Ashes | | Robert Florio | NBC |
| 1991 (43rd) | Separate But Equal | "Part 2" | John W. Wheeler | ABC |
| 1991 (43rd) | Stephen King's It | "Part 1" | Robert F. Shugrue and David Blangsted | ABC |
| 1992 (44th) | Young Indiana Jones and the Curse of the Jackal | | Edgar Burcksen | ABC |
| 1992 (44th) | Afterburn | | Jerrold L. Ludwig | HBO |
| 1992 (44th) | Drug Wars: The Cocaine Cartel | "Part 2" | Douglas Ibold | NBC |
| 1992 (44th) | Homefront | "S.N.A.F.U." | William B. Stich and Michael B. Hoggan | ABC |
| 1992 (44th) | I'll Fly Away | "Pilot" | David Rosenbloom and Karen I. Stern | NBC |
| 1993 (45th) | Citizen Cohn | | Peter Zinner | HBO |
| 1993 (45th) | Alex Haley's Queen | "Part 3" | Paul LaMastra and James Galloway | CBS |
| 1993 (45th) | Barbarians at the Gate | | Patrick Kennedy | HBO |
| 1993 (45th) | Sinatra | "Part 1" | Scott Vickrey | CBS |
| 1994 (46th) | And the Band Played On | | Lois Freeman-Fox | HBO |
| 1994 (46th) | Geronimo | | Millie Moore | TNT |
| 1994 (46th) | Gypsy | | William H. Reynolds | CBS |
| 1994 (46th) | To Dance with the White Dog | | Bill Blunden | CBS |
| 1994 (46th) | World War II: When Lions Roared | "Part 1" | John A. Martinelli | NBC |
| 1995 (47th) | Indictment: The McMartin Trial | | Richard A. Harris | HBO |
| 1995 (47th) | Amelia Earhart: The Final Flight | | Michael D. Ornstein | TNT |
| 1995 (47th) | Buffalo Girls | | Richard Bracken | CBS |
| 1995 (47th) | Citizen X | | William Goldenberg | HBO |
| 1995 (47th) | The Piano Lesson | | Jim Oliver | CBS |
| 1995 (47th) | Serving in Silence: The Margarethe Cammermeyer Story | | Geoffrey Rowland | NBC |
| 1996 (48th) | The Tuskegee Airmen | | David Beatty | HBO |
| 1996 (48th) | Andersonville | | Paul Rubell | TNT |
| 1996 (48th) | Gulliver's Travels | | Peter Coulson | NBC |
| 1996 (48th) | Hiroshima | | Denis Papillon, John Soh and Dominique Fortin | Showtime |
| 1996 (48th) | Truman | | Lisa Fruchtman | HBO |
| 1997 (49th) | Miss Evers' Boys | | Michael Brown | HBO |
| 1997 (49th) | Crime of the Century | | Antony Gibbs | HBO |
| 1997 (49th) | Gotti | | Zach Staenberg | HBO |
| 1997 (49th) | If These Walls Could Talk | "1952" and "1974" | Elena Maganini | HBO |
| 1997 (49th) | In Cold Blood | | Michael D. Ornstein | CBS |
| 1997 (49th) | The Man Who Captured Eichmann | | Drake Silliman | TNT |
| 1998 (50th) | Gia | | Eric A. Sears | HBO |
| 1998 (50th) | Don King: Only in America | | Steven Cohen | HBO |
| 1998 (50th) | From the Earth to the Moon | "Can We Do This?" | Laurie Grotstein | HBO |
| 1998 (50th) | From the Earth to the Moon | "1968" | Richard Pearson | HBO |
| 1998 (50th) | Merlin | "Part 1" | Colin Green | NBC |
| 1999 (51st) | Horatio Hornblower | "The Duel" | Keith Palmer | A&E |
| 1999 (51st) | Dash and Lilly | | Cindy Mollo | A&E |
| 1999 (51st) | Joan of Arc | "Part 2" | Ralph Brunjes | CBS |
| 1999 (51st) | Pirates of Silicon Valley | | Richard Halsey | TNT |
| 1999 (51st) | The Rat Pack | | Eric A. Sears | HBO |
| 1999 (51st) | The Temptations | "Part 2" | Neil Mandelberg and John Duffy | NBC |

=== 2000s ===
| Year | Program | Episode | Nominees | Network |
|---|---|---|---|---|
| 2000 (52nd) | Tuesdays with Morrie | | Carol Littleton | ABC |
| 2000 (52nd) | Annie | | Scott Vickrey | ABC |
| 2000 (52nd) | The Beach Boys: An American Family | "Part 1" | Geoffrey Rowland and Bryan M. Horne | ABC |
| 2000 (52nd) | Introducing Dorothy Dandridge | | Alan Heim | HBO |
| 2000 (52nd) | RKO 281 | | Alex Mackie | HBO |
| 2001 (53rd) | Wit | | John Bloom | HBO |
| 2001 (53rd) | Anne Frank: The Whole Story | | Christopher Rouse | ABC |
| 2001 (53rd) | Conspiracy | | Peter Zinner | HBO |
| 2001 (53rd) | Life with Judy Garland: Me and My Shadows | "Part 1" | Dody Dorn | ABC |
| 2001 (53rd) | 61* | | Michael Jablow | HBO |
| 2002 (54th) | Band of Brothers | "Day of Days" | Frances Parker | HBO |
| 2002 (54th) | Band of Brothers | "Replacements" | Billy Fox | HBO |
| 2002 (54th) | James Dean | | Antony Gibbs | TNT |
| 2002 (54th) | The Lost Battalion | | William B. Stich | A&E |
| 2002 (54th) | Shackleton | "Part 2" | Peter Coulson | A&E |
| 2003 (55th) | Live from Baghdad | | Joe Hutshing | HBO |
| 2003 (55th) | Door to Door | | Paul Dixon | TNT |
| 2003 (55th) | Hitler: The Rise of Evil | "Part 1" | Henk Van Eeghen and Sylvain Lebel | CBS |
| 2003 (55th) | Homeless to Harvard: The Liz Murray Story | | Anita Brandt Burgoyne | Lifetime |
| 2003 (55th) | Taken | "High Hopes" | Toni Morgan | Sci Fi |
| 2004 (56th) | Something the Lord Made | | Michael Brown | HBO |
| 2004 (56th) | And Starring Pancho Villa as Himself | | Mark Warner and Edward Warschilka | HBO |
| 2004 (56th) | Angels in America | "Millennium Approaches" | John Bloom and Antonia Van Drimmelen | HBO |
| 2004 (56th) | Battlestar Galactica | "Part 1" | Dany Cooper | Sci Fi |
| 2004 (56th) | 44 Minutes: The North Hollywood Shoot-Out | | William B. Stich | FX |
| 2004 (56th) | Ike: Countdown to D-Day | | Chris Peppe | A&E |
| 2005 (57th) | The Life and Death of Peter Sellers | | John Smith | HBO |
| 2005 (57th) | Back When We Were Grownups | | Tina Hirsch | CBS |
| 2005 (57th) | Empire Falls | "Part 2" | Kate Williams | HBO |
| 2005 (57th) | Faith of My Fathers | | Scott Boyd | A&E |
| 2005 (57th) | The Wool Cap | | Paul Dixon | TNT |
| 2006 (58th) | Elizabeth I | "Part 1" | Beverley Mills | HBO |
| 2006 (58th) | Elizabeth I | "Part 2" | Melanie Oliver | HBO |
| 2006 (58th) | Flight 93 | | Scott Boyd | A&E |
| 2006 (58th) | The Girl in the Café | | Mark Day | HBO |
| 2006 (58th) | The Ten Commandments | | Ingrid Koller, Klaus Hundsbichler, Victor Du Bois and Mark Conte | ABC |
| 2007 (59th) | Bury My Heart at Wounded Knee | | Michael D. Ornstein and Michael Brown | HBO |
| 2007 (59th) | The Path to 9/11 | "Part 2" | Geoffrey Rowland, Eric A. Sears, Bryan M. Horne, David Handman and Mitchell Danton | ABC |
| 2007 (59th) | Broken Trail | "Part 2" | Freeman A. Davies and Phil Norden | AMC |
| 2007 (59th) | Jane Eyre | "Part 1" | Jason Krasucki | PBS |
| 2007 (59th) | Life Support | | Mary Jo Markey | HBO |
| 2007 (59th) | The Starter Wife | "Part 3" | Robert Florio | USA |
| 2008 (60th) | Recount | | Alan Baumgarten | HBO |
| 2008 (60th) | The Andromeda Strain | "Part 1" | Scott Vickrey | A&E |
| 2008 (60th) | Extras: The Extra Special Series Finale | | Richard Halladey and Graham Barker | HBO |
| 2008 (60th) | John Adams | "Independence" | Melanie Oliver | HBO |
| 2008 (60th) | Tin Man | "Part 1" | Allan Lee | Sci Fi |
| 2009 (61st) | Taking Chance | | Lee Percy and Brian A. Kates | HBO |
| 2009 (61st) | Generation Kill | "A Burning Dog" | Oral Norrie Ottey | HBO |
| 2009 (61st) | Generation Kill | "The Cradle of Civilization" | Jason Krasucki | HBO |
| 2009 (61st) | Grey Gardens | | Alan Heim and Lee Percy | HBO |
| 2009 (61st) | 24: Redemption | | Scott Powell | Fox |

=== 2010s ===
| Year | Program | Episode | Nominees | Network |
|---|---|---|---|---|
| 2010 (62nd) | Temple Grandin | | Leo Trombetta | HBO |
| 2010 (62nd) | The Pacific | "Part 5" | Edward A. Warschilka | HBO |
| 2010 (62nd) | The Pacific | "Part 8" | Alan Cody | HBO |
| 2010 (62nd) | The Pacific | "Part 9" | Alan Cody and Marta Évry | HBO |
| 2010 (62nd) | You Don't Know Jack | | Aaron Yanes | HBO |
| 2011 (63rd) | Cinema Verite | | Sarah Flack and Robert Pulcini | HBO |
| 2011 (63rd) | Downton Abbey | "Episode One" | John Wilson | PBS |
| 2011 (63rd) | Mildred Pierce | "Part 4" | Camilla Toniolo | HBO |
| 2011 (63rd) | Sherlock: A Study in Pink | | Charlie Phillips | PBS |
| 2011 (63rd) | Too Big to Fail | | Barbara Tulliver and Plummy Tucker | HBO |
| 2012 (64th) | Hatfields & McCoys | "Part 2" | Don Cassidy | History |
| 2012 (64th) | American Horror Story | "Birth" | Fabienne Bouville | FX |
| 2012 (64th) | Game Change | | Lucia Zucchetti | HBO |
| 2012 (64th) | Hemingway & Gellhorn | | Walter Murch | HBO |
| 2012 (64th) | Sherlock: A Scandal in Belgravia | | Charlie Phillips | PBS |
| 2013 (65th) | Behind the Candelabra | | Mary Ann Bernard | HBO |
| 2013 (65th) | American Horror Story: Asylum | "Nor'easter" | Fabienne Bouville | FX |
| 2013 (65th) | Killing Lincoln | | Steve Polivka | Nat Geo |
| 2013 (65th) | Phil Spector | | Barbara Tulliver | HBO |
| 2013 (65th) | Top of the Lake | "Part 5" | Alexandre de Franceschi and Scott Gray | Sundance |
| 2014 (66th) | Sherlock: His Last Vow | | Yan Miles | PBS |
| 2014 (66th) | Fargo | "Buridan's Ass" | Regis Kimble | FX |
| 2014 (66th) | Fargo | "The Crocodile's Dilemma" | Skip Macdonald | FX |
| 2014 (66th) | Fargo | "The Rooster Prince" | Bridget Durnford | FX |
| 2014 (66th) | The Normal Heart | | Adam Penn | HBO |
| 2015 (67th) | Olive Kitteridge | "Security" | Jeffrey M. Werner | HBO |
| 2015 (67th) | American Crime | "Episode One" | Luyen Vu | ABC |
| 2015 (67th) | Houdini | "Part 1" | Sabrina Plisco and David Beatty | History |
| 2015 (67th) | 24: Live Another Day | "10:00 p.m. – 11:00 a.m." | Scott Powell | Fox |
| 2015 (67th) | Wolf Hall | "Entirely Beloved" | David Blackmore | PBS |
2016 (68th)
| 2016 (68th) | The People v. O. J. Simpson: American Crime Story | "The Race Card" | C. Chi-Yoon Chung | FX |
| 2016 (68th) | Fargo | "Did You Do This? No, You Did It!" | Curtis Thurber and Skip Macdonald | FX |
| 2016 (68th) | Fargo | "Waiting for Dutch" | Skip Macdonald | FX |
| 2016 (68th) | The People v. O. J. Simpson: American Crime Story | "From the Ashes of Tragedy" | Adam Penn | FX |
| 2016 (68th) | The People v. O. J. Simpson: American Crime Story | "The Verdict" | Stewart Schill | FX |
2017 (69th)
| 2017 (69th) | The Night Of | "The Beach" | Jay Cassidy and Nick Houy | HBO |
| 2017 (69th) | Big Little Lies | "You Get What You Need" | Veronique Barbe, David Berman, Justin LaChance, Maxime Lahaie, Sylvain Lebel and Jim Vega | HBO |
| 2017 (69th) | Fargo | "Aporia" | Henk Van Eeghen | FX |
| 2017 (69th) | Fargo | "The Law of Vacant Places" | Regis Kimble | FX |
| 2017 (69th) | Fargo | "The Narrow Escape Problem" | Curtis Thurber | FX |
2018 (70th)
| 2018 (70th) | USS Callister (Black Mirror) | | Selina MacArthur | Netflix |
| 2018 (70th) | The Assassination of Gianni Versace: American Crime Story | "Alone" | Emily Greene | FX |
| 2018 (70th) | The Assassination of Gianni Versace: American Crime Story | "House by the Lake" | Shelly Westerman | FX |
| 2018 (70th) | The Assassination of Gianni Versace: American Crime Story | "Manhunt" | Chi-Yoon Chung | FX |
| 2018 (70th) | Twin Peaks | "Part 8" | Duwayne Dunham, Brian Berdan, Jonathan P. Shaw, Justin Krohn, Jason W.A. Tucker and David Lynch | Showtime |
2019 (71st)
| 2019 (71st) | Chernobyl | "Please Remain Calm" | Simon Smith | HBO |
| 2019 (71st) | Chernobyl | "Open Wide, O Earth" | Jinx Godfrey | HBO |
| 2019 (71st) | Deadwood: The Movie | | Martin Nicholson and Erick Fefferman | HBO |
| 2019 (71st) | Fosse/Verdon | "Life Is a Cabaret" | Tim Streeto | FX |
| 2019 (71st) | Sharp Objects | "Fix" | Véronique Barbe, Justin Lachance, Maxime Lahaie, Émile Vallée and Jai M. Vee | HBO |
| 2019 (71st) | True Detective | "If You Have Ghosts" | Leo Trombetta | HBO |

=== 2020s ===
| Year | Program | Episode | Nominees | Network |
|---|---|---|---|---|
2020 (72nd)
| 2020 (72nd) | Watchmen | "A God Walks into Abar" | Henk Van Eeghen | HBO |
| 2020 (72nd) | El Camino: A Breaking Bad Movie | | Skip Macdonald | Netflix |
| 2020 (72nd) | Mrs. America | "Phyllis" | Robert Komatsu | FX |
| 2020 (72nd) | Watchmen | "It's Summer and We're Running Out of Ice" | David Eisenberg | HBO |
| 2020 (72nd) | Watchmen | "This Extraordinary Being" | Anna Hauger | HBO |
2021 (73rd)
| 2021 (73rd) | The Queen's Gambit | "Exchanges" | Michelle Tesoro | Netflix |
| 2021 (73rd) | Mare of Easttown | "Fathers" | Amy E. Duddleston and Naomi Sunrise Filoramo | HBO |
| 2021 (73rd) | Mare of Easttown | "Miss Lady Hawk Herself" | Amy E. Duddleston | HBO |
| 2021 (73rd) | WandaVision | "On a Very Special Episode..." | Nona Khodai | Disney+ |
| 2021 (73rd) | WandaVision | "The Series Finale" | Zene Baker, Michael A. Webber, Nona Khodai and Tim Roche | Disney+ |
2022 (74th)
| 2022 (74th) | The White Lotus | "Departures" | John M. Valerio | HBO |
| 2022 (74th) | Dopesick | "Black Box Warning" | C. Chi-yoon Chung | Hulu |
| 2022 (74th) | Dopesick | "First Bottle" | Douglas Crise | Hulu |
| 2022 (74th) | Pam & Tommy | "I Love You, Tommy" | Tatiana S. Riegel | Hulu |
| 2022 (74th) | Station Eleven | "Unbroken Circle" | David Eisenberg, Anna Hauger, Anthony McAfee and Yoni Reiss | HBO Max |
| 2022 (74th) | The White Lotus | "Mysterious Monkeys" | Heather Persons | HBO |
2023 (75th)
| 2023 (75th) | Beef | "Figures of Light" | Nat Fuller and Laura Zempel | Netflix |
| 2023 (75th) | Dahmer – Monster: The Jeffrey Dahmer Story | "The Good Boy Box" | Stephanie Filo | Netflix |
| 2023 (75th) | Ms. Marvel | "Generation Why" | Nona Khodai and Sabrina Plisco | Disney+ |
| 2023 (75th) | Obi-Wan Kenobi | "Part VI" | Kelley Dixon and Josh Earl | Disney+ |
| 2023 (75th) | Prey | | Angela Catanzaro and Claudia Castello | Hulu |
| 2023 (75th) | Weird: The Al Yankovic Story | | Jamie Kennedy | Roku |
2024 (76th)
| 2024 (76th) | Baby Reindeer | "Episode 4" | Peter H. Oliver and Benjamin Gerstein | Netflix |
| 2024 (76th) | Black Mirror | "Beyond the Sea" | Jon Harris | Netflix |
| 2024 (76th) | Fargo | "The Tragedy of the Commons" | Regis Kimble | FX |
| 2024 (76th) | Ripley | "III Sommerso" | Joshua Raymond Lee and David O. Rogers | Netflix |
| 2024 (76th) | True Detective: Night Country | "Part 4" | Matt Chessé | HBO |
| 2024 (76th) | True Detective: Night Country | "Part 6" | Brenna Rangott | HBO |
2025 (77th)
| 2025 (77th) | Monsters: The Lyle and Erik Menendez Story | "Blame It on the Rain" | Peggy Tachdjian | Netflix |
| 2025 (77th) | The Penguin | "Bliss" | Andy Keir | HBO |
| 2025 (77th) | The Penguin | "Cent'Anni" | Meg Reticker | HBO |
| 2025 (77th) | The Penguin | "A Great or Little Thing" | Henk van Eeghen | HBO |
| 2025 (77th) | Sirens | "Exile" | Catherine Haight | Netflix |
2026 (78th)
| 2026 (78th) | DTF St. Louis | "No One's Normal. It Just Looks That Way from Across the Street" | Kevin D. Ross and Max Koepke | HBO |
| 2026 (78th) | Beef | "All the Things We're Never Going to Have" | Laura Zempel | Netflix |
| 2026 (78th) | Beef | "The Increasing Flimsiness of Any Certainties About the Future" | Lauren Connelly | Netflix |
| 2026 (78th) | Black Rabbit | "Isle of Joy" | Vikash Patel | Netflix |
| 2026 (78th) | Death by Lightning | "The Man from Ohio" | Joseph Krings, Anna Hauger, Michael Ruscio, Joe Leonard, Bridget Case and Derek Desmond | Netflix |

== Editors with multiple awards ==
4 awards

- John A. Martinelli

3 awards

- Michael Brown
- Eric A. Sears

2 awards

- Paul LaMastra
- Jerrold L. Ludwig
- Peter Zinner

== Editors with multiple nominations ==
9 nominations

- John A. Martinelli

6 nominations

- Paul LaMastra
- Jerrold L. Ludwig

5 nominations

- James Galloway

4 nominations

- Michael Brown
- Henk Van Eeghen
- Robert Florio
- Les Green
- Bud S. Isaacs
- Skip Macdonald
- Rita Roland
- Eric A. Sears
- Robert F. Shugrue
- Peter Zinner

3 nominations

- John Bloom
- Fred A. Chulack
- C. Chi-Yoon Chung
- Paul Dixon
- Michael Eliot
- Anna Hauger
- Alan Heim
- Nona Khodai
- Michael D. Ornstein
- Geoffrey Rowland
- William B. Stich
- Scott Vickrey
- Benjamin A. Weissman

2 nominations

- Véronique Barbe
- David Beatty
- Henry Berman
- Bill Blunden
- Fabienne Bouville
- Scott Boyd
- Richard Bracken
- Byron 'Buzz' Brandt
- John F. Burnett
- Steven Cohen
- Alan Cody
- Peter Coulson
- Amy E. Duddleston
- David Eisenberg
- Ronald J. Fagan
- Gene Fowler
- Mel Friedman
- Antony Gibbs
- Bryan M. Horne
- Regis Kimble
- Jason Krasucki
- Justin Lachance
- Maxime Lahaie
- Robert K. Lambert
- Sylvain Lebel
- Michael S. McLean
- Millie Moore
- George Nicholson
- Melanie Oliver
- Adam Penn
- Lee Percy
- Charlie Phillips
- Sabrina Plisco
- Donald R. Rode
- Paul Rubell
- Curtis Thurber
- Leo Trombetta
- Barbara Tulliver
- Edward Warschilka
- Robert Watts
- Jon Woodcock
- John Wright
- Jerry Young
- Laura Zempel

== Programs with multiple nominations ==
9 nominations

- Fargo

6 nominations

- American Crime Story

3 nominations

- Beef
- The Pacific
- The Penguin
- Sherlock
- True Detective
- Watchmen

2 nominations

- American Horror Story
- Band of Brothers
- Black Mirror
- Chernobyl
- Dopesick
- Elizabeth I
- From the Earth to the Moon
- Generation Kill
- Mare of Easttown
- The Thorn Birds
- WandaVision
- The White Lotus
