= Part 5 (True Detective) =

- True Detective episode
- Episode no.: Season 4 Episode 5
- Directed by: Issa López
- Written by: Katrina Albright; Wenonah Wilms; Chris Mundy; Issa López
- Cinematography by: Florian Hoffmeister
- Editing by: Mags Arnold
- Original air dates: February 9, 2024 (online); February 11, 2024 (HBO)
- Running time: 63 minutes

Guest appearance
- June Thiele as Nurse Ivy

Episode chronology
← Previous "Part 4"	Next → "Part 6"
- True Detective (season 4)

"Part 5", also known as "Night Country, Part 5", is the fifth episode of the fourth season of the American anthology crime drama television series True Detective. It is the 29th overall episode of the series and was written by Katrina Albright, Wenonah Wilms, executive producer Chris Mundy and executive producer Issa López, and directed by López. It was broadcast on HBO in the United States on February 11, 2024, but it was available on Max on February 9, 2024, to avoid competition with Super Bowl LVIII.

The season takes place in Ennis, Alaska, and follows detectives Liz Danvers and Evangeline Navarro as they investigate the disappearance of eight men who operate the Tsalal Arctic Research Station and vanish without a trace. While occasionally working together, Danvers and Navarro are not on good terms after an unresolved case, which was very personal for Navarro. In the episode, Danvers and Navarro find a new lead in an icy cave in the outskirts, while Peter faces problems in his life.

According to Nielsen Media Research, the episode was seen by an estimated 0.371 million household viewers and gained a 0.04 ratings share among adults aged 18–49. The episode received generally positive reviews from critics, who praised its narrative developments, climactic moments, and acting, although some critics questioned its pacing with only one episode left.

== Plot ==
Julia's body is cremated at the morgue on December 31. The ashes are delivered to Navarro (Kali Reis) in an urn. Danvers (Jodie Foster) questions Otis (Klaus Tange), who is unsure of all the events, about his relationship with Clark. He relates that he was helping men who were caught in a cave accident when he heard a sound and then lost consciousness. The cave's entrance is near a place called Bear Creek, but Otis warns that she cannot go alone. Danvers and Navarro go to the cave but cannot enter because the entrance has been destroyed by explosives.

Peter (Finn Bennett) is asked by Kayla (Anna Lambe) to leave their house, forcing him to move back with Hank (John Hawkes). Leah (Isabella Star LaBlanc) and her girlfriend join a rally to protest outside the Silver Sky mining offices, which soon escalates into a riot. Police are dispatched, including Navarro. She is hit by something thrown by Leah, who is surprised to see her. Leah is beaten by another officer until Navarro steps in to fight the officer. Per Danvers' instructions, Leah is locked up at the county jail. At the station, Peter tells Danvers that he investigated Tuttle United, which is operating alongside Norbank Securities as a founding partner of Silver Sky. They conclude Tsalal is funded by Silver Sky and was providing fake data on their pollution emissions.

Danvers goes to the Silver Sky headquarters to speak with executive Kate McKitterick (Dervla Kirwan), who is talking with Connelly (Christopher Eccleston). Kate is aware of Danvers's visit to the cave, questioning her authority since it's on the company's property. Danvers accuses Silver Sky of their involvement, prompting Connelly to warn her that the case is closed, revealing that he knows the truth about their encounter with William Wheeler. Privately, Kate meets with Hank to inform him of the meeting with Danvers, telling him he needs to prevent her from finding out more. She asks him to kill Otis to prevent progress in the investigation, promising Hank that he would become Police Chief, a promise she had already made to get Hank's help on the Annie case years prior, but that was thwarted by Danvers' unforeseen arrival.

Qavvik (Joel Montgrand) introduces his friend, Kenny, to Navarro. Kenny found a rock with the spiral symbol and was warned by his grandparents to stay away from the caves, as they would go to the "night country". Navarro wants to continue the case, but Danvers warns her to stop as Connelly will prevent anything. Angry, Navarro releases Leah from her cell. With help from Rose (Fiona Shaw), Navarro shatters the ice to scatter Julia's ashes into the sea as a storm approaches. Navarro starts hallucinating and almost falls in as the ice shatters. Realizing that Hank informed Connelly of the investigation, Danvers accuses Peter of telling him. Deducing that Hank gained access to his laptop, Peter questions Danvers about her role in Wheeler's death, having concluded that evidence was forged in the victims' files. He asks if she and Navarro killed him and staged his death to look like a suicide, which she does not confirm but congratulates him for "asking the right questions."

Danvers gets Otis out of the treatment facility and calls Navarro to meet up at her house to go to the caves. Danvers takes Otis to her house, bribing him with heroin in exchange for the location of the best alternate point to enter the caves. She is visited by Hank, who claims that he needs to take Otis on Connelly's orders. He takes Danvers' gun and executes Otis. Peter arrives pointing a gun and is pressured by Hank to help him. Hank admits he moved Annie’s body after she died in the cave and aims his gun at Danvers, prompting Peter to kill him. Danvers consoles the shaken Peter as Navarro arrives. Believing Connelly to be corrupt, and fearing for Peter's safety, Navarro refuses to get him involved, and prepares to stage the scene as an accidental death. Danvers reluctantly agrees, and Peter decides to clean the crime scene himself while Navarro and Danvers leave for the caves.

== Production ==
=== Development ===
The episode was written by Katrina Albright, Wenonah Wilms, executive producer Chris Mundy and executive producer Issa López, and directed by López. This marked Albright's first writing credit, Wilms' first writing credit, Mundy's second writing credit, López's fifth writing credit, and López's fifth directing credit.

=== Writing ===
While the scene where Peter kills Hank remains mostly intact from the original version, the initial dialogue would be aggressive. While Bennett liked the scene, Foster and Hawkes thought the dialogue could be improved as "Pete's in the middle. We just need to convince him to come to our side." He explained, "The scene's really about Danvers appealing to Pete's rationality and his moral compass. Hank appeals to something more sentimental. It's a tug of war, with Pete as the rope in the middle." He also thought that Peter offered to clean the scene out of guilt, saying "I think he sides with Navarro and he can see that this [needs to be done], otherwise it will all be for nothing and would be a waste of human life."

=== Music ===
The song that Hank plays with the guitar was written by John Hawkes himself. Originally, as Hawkes described, "it's just a guy sitting around playing the guitar, and it will end up, as the script described, scoring some work between Danvers and Navarro and the mine riot." López liked the song and suggested expanding it to include it in the episode.

== Reception ==
=== Viewers ===
The episode was watched by 0.371 million viewers, earning a 0.04 in the 18–49 rating demographics on the Nielsen Media Research ratings scale. This means that 0.04 percent of all households with televisions watched the episode. This was a 48% decrease from the previous episode, which was watched by 0.722 million viewers with a 0.11 in the 18–49 demographics.

=== Critical reviews ===
"Part 5" received generally positive reviews from critics. The review aggregator website Rotten Tomatoes reported an 90% approval rating for the episode, based on 10 reviews.

Scott Tobias of The New York Times gave the episode a positive review. He expressed that in contrast to the lengthy ruminative moments of episodes past, Part 5 brings back the "excitement of the premiere…because there are finally some answers to the questions that have been teased out for so long." He praised the episode's hewing to "classic noir", and said that Foster's scenes show why her "casting pays dividends". He also described the scene in which Navarro appeals to Danvers' conscience as the most powerful in the episode. Critics said the episode contained the strongest parallels yet between the character of Liz Danvers and Foster's Clarice Starling, with Tobias commenting that Danvers is like a "compromised version of Starling."

Amanda Whiting of Vulture gave the episode a perfect 5 star rating out of 5 and noted, "For a series defined by its characters' icy toughness, a sense of nostalgia takes hold in True Detective's penultimate episode, which I suppose makes its own kind of sense." She concluded, "Until 'Part Five,' ice has been a solid fact of existence in Ennis, but nothing and no one is completely unbreakable. Hammer away hard enough and you can pierce through the ice to save your kid’s life or make your little sister a watery grave."

Ben Travers of IndieWire gave the episode a "B+" grade and wrote, "What's been lost to this case is sizable. What can be gained from solving it is unknown, though potentially even greater. They've made their choices. Now, let's hope they can live with them."

Coleman Spilde of The Daily Beast wrote, "We won't have a sense of whether showrunner-writer-director Issa López was panicking to tie up loose ends with only one episode of the season left, or if this barrage of intersecting plotlines is part of her grand scheme, until next week. What I do know is that this episode's final 10 minutes were this season’s most shocking yet, and my audible gasps were enough to make me suspend my simmering apprehension, at least for now."

Christina Izzo of The A.V. Club gave the episode a "C+" grade and wrote, "I love a whodunit mystery suffused with local color and character drama as much as the next true-crime-addicted TV fan, but those details and textures need a longer episode count than what they’re working with here. With little more than an hour left of season four, there are far too many questions still left to mine about the murders to pause for a Prior family meltdown. How will all of these disparate figures Corpsicle themselves together in the solving of these cases? Will the spooks lead to something substantial, or are they just there for eeriness sake? And, like Liz Danvers always pesters Peter, are we even asking the right questions to begin with?"

Erik Kain of Forbes wrote, "Whatever this is, it's not True Detective. But it certainly is a hot mess. We have some interesting characters here and some missed opportunities to really explore them. Hank, in particular, feels like a character we could have delved into a lot more but was ultimately written off as some cartoon villain. Mostly, I just find everyone tedious and exhausting. The sense of urgency this episode ends on comes out of nowhere."
