= Part 1 (True Detective) =

- True Detective episode
- Episode no.: Season 4 Episode 1
- Directed by: Issa López
- Written by: Issa López
- Cinematography by: Florian Hoffmeister
- Editing by: Matt Chessé
- Original air date: January 14, 2024
- Running time: 58 minutes

Guest appearances
- L'xeis Diane Benson as Bee; Aka Niviâna as Julia Navarro

Episode chronology
← Previous "Now Am Found"	Next → "Part 2"
- True Detective season 4

"Part 1", also known as "Night Country, Part 1", is the first episode of the fourth season of the American anthology crime drama television series True Detective. It is the 25th overall episode of the series and was written and directed by executive producer Issa López. It was first broadcast on HBO in the United States on January 14, 2024, and also was available on Max on the same date. It was the first episode of the series to not be written by series creator Nic Pizzolatto.

The season takes place in Ennis, Alaska, and follows detectives Liz Danvers and Evangeline Navarro as they investigate the disappearance of eight men who operate the Tsalal Arctic Research Station and vanish without a trace. While occasionally working together, Danvers and Navarro are not on good terms after an unresolved case, which was very personal for Navarro.

According to Nielsen Media Research, the episode was seen by an estimated 0.565 million household viewers and gained a 0.08 ratings share among adults aged 18–49. The episode received critical acclaim, with critics praising the performances (particularly Foster and Reis), new setting, atmosphere and directing.

== Plot ==
On December 17, a man in Alaska is hunting caribou during the last day of sunlight. As the sun sets, the entire herd of caribou suddenly become erratic and leap to their deaths off a cliff.

At the Tsalal Arctic Research Station, a team of scientists go on with their daily routines. Suddenly, a senior researcher named Raymond Clark has a seizure and declares "she’s awake" before the lights turn off. Three days later, a delivery man arrives at the station with food, but no one is there. As he inspects the area, he discovers a severed tongue.

After handling an assault case at a seafood factory, Alaska State Trooper Evangeline Navarro (Kali Reis) is recalled to the police station in the town of Ennis, near the research station. The department is run by Liz Danvers (Jodie Foster), the Ennis police chief whom Navarro formerly worked with as a detective before being transferred. Danvers is present at the research station where her colleague, Peter Prior (Finn Bennett), explains the station's purpose. The eight scientists have disappeared, leaving just the words "We are all dead" written on a dry erase board. Finding that the tongue belongs to a Native woman, she instructs Peter's father Hank (John Hawkes), a veteran detective, to check on local corpses.

Danvers returns to the police station, where Navarro insists on getting involved in the case. Navarro claims that the woman must be Iñupiat, the same ethnicity as activist Anne Kowtok, who was infamously murdered six years prior. Danvers is forced to leave the station when her teenage stepdaughter, Leah (Isabella Star LaBlanc), gets in trouble for making a sex tape with her girlfriend. As she scolds her while driving, they witness a car crash. She arrests the drunk driver, Stacy Chalmers, who is despondent that her child won't talk with her.

Navarro speaks with Ryan, Anne's brother, who is surprised to learn that Navarro believes in God. Navarro then goes to check on her sister Julia (Aka Niviâna) who claims someone was inside her apartment despite it being locked from the inside. Like their mother before them, Julia suffers from mental health issues, but Navarro tells her she is not like their mother and promises her she will not be hospitalized. Elsewhere, Rose Aguineau (Fiona Shaw) is disturbed by the presence of a barefoot man outside her house, whom she greets as Travis.

Despite not seeing a connection to the case, Danvers gets Peter to retrieve Anne's file from his father's home, though he is unsuccessful in hiding this act from Hank. It is revealed that Navarro was the first to arrive at the scene where Anne was found dead; she died from multiple stab wounds and had her tongue severed, but the weapon and the culprit were never found. Navarro became so obsessed with the case that she started harassing and assaulting people from the local mine, believing that they were involved in her death. Hank made an arrangement for Navarro to join the State Police to keep her from making any further trouble. The case was reassigned to then-Detective Danvers, where it later went cold.

After having sex with her lover Eddie Qavvik (Joel D. Montgrand), Navarro sabotages the truck belonging to the man she arrested earlier for assault. Danvers is unable to sleep, as she is haunted by the voice of a child named Holden who calls her "mommy". Both Navarro and Danvers hear the words "she’s awake", with Navarro also encountering a polar bear with one eye (eerily resembling a teddy bear Danvers has at home) while driving through town. This prompts Danvers to continue her investigation, finding a connection from the eight scientists to Anne. Rose follows Travis on the outskirts of Ennis, who wordlessly guides her to a nearby area.

Danvers returns to the research station, encountering Navarro. Danvers reveals that she found a possible connection through a parka worn by both Anne and Clark, one of the scientists. Their encounter turns hostile as both accuse each other of failing to solve Anne's case. They are interrupted when Peter calls Danvers to inform her that Rose has found something in the ice. The two greet Rose after arriving via helicopter, where Rose states that Travis led her to the site, despite confirming to Navarro that he is already dead. Authorities discover three men frozen in the ice, all of whom have terrified looks on their faces.

== Production ==
=== Development ===
The episode was written and directed by executive producer Issa López, marking her first writing and directing credit.

=== Writing ===
When questioned about the constant mentions of "she is awake", Issa López explained, "Well, we know what happened to Annie, which is terrible, but we don't know if this is the "she's awake" we're talking about. We have no clue at this moment. We do know that the events at Tsalal are in a certain strange way speaking to Danvers and speaking to Navarro and calling to attention that something has changed."

The original concept for Danvers was different from the final version. López envisioned "a woman on the verge" of a breakdown that eventually grows stronger. This version conflicted with Jodie Foster's vision of the character, so López asked if she wanted her "to make her an asshole?", which Foster enthusiastically agreed. She also changed Danvers' depiction of grief, with López saying, "there's a lot of meanness and arrogance and a bad sense of humor that's not really funny. All of that comes from this place of pain she's hiding. It's more interesting, and it better serves Navarro’s story, who is the central voice of the piece, the Indigenous voice. I wanted Danvers to serve that." Finn Bennett described the relationship between Danvers and the Priors, "They're just the police. They really run that town. I guess you could say in some aspects there is a maternal element to Danvers and Peter Prior's relationship."

López said that the Iñupiat culture was a challenge, as she was not familiar before writing the scripts. She said, "the more I understood about the location where I wanted to set the story, the more I knew that 70% of the population is Iñupiaq, at least Indigenous, in these parts of Alaska, and it would be unfair to make my characters any other color. So, the representation of these characters, in a way that was not only respectful, but a chance for them to see themselves in TV, was enormous. That part of the work required a lot of research and dialogue."

== Reception ==
=== Viewers ===
The episode was watched by 0.565 million viewers, earning a 0.08 in the 18–49 rating demographics on the Nielsen Media Research ratings scale. This means that 0.08 percent of all households with televisions watched the episode. This was a 60% decrease from the previous episode, which was watched by 1.38 million viewers with a 0.4 in the 18–49 demographics.

=== Critical reviews ===
"Part 1" received critical acclaim. The review aggregator website Rotten Tomatoes reported an 94% approval rating for the episode, based on 16 reviews. The site's consensus states: "Creepy and patiently paced, Night Country's first installment introduces Jodie Foster and Kali Reis' dueling detectives with grim efficiency."

Christina Izzo of The A.V. Club gave the episode an "A" grade and wrote, "From the true-crime bleakness to the unnerving supernaturalism, there are more than enough chilling elements for our leads to chip away at over the next five episodes. With a snowy tundra and a severed tongue, True Detective Sundays are officially back."

Alan Sepinwall of Rolling Stone wrote, "All in all, it's an impressive premiere, whether you want to call this the fourth season of an old show or the first season of a new one." Ben Travers of IndieWire gave the episode a "B+" grade and wrote, "There's Navarro’s gruesome flashback to her last tour of duty, where a fellow soldier is missing half her head; Danvers' fleeting memory of her family's car accident, triggered by the broken glass she steps on when walking over to the drunk driver. Add in whatever caused the two former colleagues to go their separate ways and True Detective: Night Country has all the hallmarks of past seasons."

Erik Kain of Forbes wrote, "I'm sad to report that I feel no such crackling excitement over Night Country, which already feels like a slog just one episode in. The pacing might be forgivable—I enjoy a slow burn — but the premiere is messy and its characters are flat and uninteresting." Coleman Spilde of The Daily Beast wrote, "while we're working with an incredibly dense set of gnarled, intersecting plotlines, True Detective: Night Country is, so far, keeping them from becoming too tangled to follow. With the introduction of an undeniable supernatural element afoot, López's intriguing new story — paired with her drolly offbeat writing — is primed to put this much-missed anthology back on track."

Amanda Whiting of Vulture gave the episode a 4 star rating out of 5 and wrote, "It's a fitting introduction, though I think I'd argue that the paradox López has swiftly established in Ennis is even more disturbing: God may be asleep, but what happens when night lasts so long man has no choice but to walk alongside the beasts." Melody McCune of Telltale TV gave the episode a 4 star rating out of 5 and wrote, "Overall, 'Part 1' of True Detective: Night Country is a solid start to the season, bolstered by nuanced character work, a plot that unravels methodically and carefully, and a genuinely engaging mystery at the center of it all. Only time will tell if Season 4 maintains the momentum established here or becomes stuck in that icy lake with the preserved corpses."

Scott Tobias of The New York Times wrote, "The supernatural aura of the season so far may well be explicable, tied to the fears and anxieties of a community that spends the winter padding around in the dark. But López isn't in any hurry to dispel the illusion, not when she can leave us jumping at shadows." Tyler Johnson of TV Fanatic gave the episode a 4.5 star rating out of 5 and wrote, "Yes, Part 1 masterfully cultivated a sense of impending doom and gathering darkness (much more literally than in seasons past), but the show's second and third seasons skillfully set the tone as well - and to say that those installments didn't quite nail the dismount would be putting it very mildly."
