= Part 4 (True Detective) =

- True Detective episode
- Episode no.: Season 4 Episode 4
- Directed by: Issa López
- Written by: Namsi Khan; Chris Mundy; Issa López
- Cinematography by: Florian Hoffmeister
- Editing by: Matt Chessé
- Original air date: February 4, 2024
- Running time: 61 minutes

Guest appearance
- Aka Niviâna as Julia Navarro

Episode chronology
← Previous "Part 3"	Next → "Part 5"
- True Detective (season 4)

"Part 4", also known as "Night Country, Part 4", is the fourth episode of the fourth season of the American anthology crime drama television series True Detective. It is the 28th overall episode of the series and was written by consulting producer Namsi Khan, executive producer Chris Mundy and executive producer Issa López, and directed by López. It was first broadcast on HBO in the United States on February 4, 2024, and also was available on Max on the same date.

The season takes place in Ennis, Alaska, and follows detectives Liz Danvers and Evangeline Navarro as they investigate the disappearance of eight men who operate the Tsalal Arctic Research Station and vanish without a trace. While occasionally working together, Danvers and Navarro are not on good terms after an unresolved case, which was very personal for Navarro. In the episode, Danvers and Navarro discover a possible connection to Clark, but Navarro experiences a family tragedy.

According to Nielsen Media Research, the episode was seen by an estimated 0.722 million household viewers and gained a 0.11 ratings share among adults aged 18–49. The episode received generally positive reviews from critics, who praised its production values, although some questioned the tone and the under-developed stories.

== Plot ==
On Christmas Eve, Danvers (Jodie Foster) is driving to meet with Peter (Finn Bennett), when she finds a shirtless Julia (Aka Niviâna) nervously walking. She tries to get her a coat, although Julia refuses at first. Navarro (Kali Reis) picks her up, and they travel to the Lighthouse, a social assistance center, where Julia chooses to stay for mental health care.

Peter finds a possible connection to Tsalal through Otis Heiss, a man with similar wounds who disappeared a few months ago. Danvers and Navarro visit science teacher Adam Bryce (Donnie Keshawarz) to help them decode the images seen in Anne's video, and he explains that one appears to be the bones of B. monodontoides. He also reveals that there is a system of ice caves near Brooks Range that could be the location of the video, and that Heiss mapped them. Navarro then visits Rose (Fiona Shaw) to talk about her life with Travis, while Danvers is forced to retrieve Leah (Isabella Star LaBlanc) who was apprehended after painting the word "murderers" on a Silver Sky mining office. Julia leaves the Lighthouse, carefully removes and folds her clothes like the Tsalal crew, walks to the shore, and drowns herself in the sea.

After reviewing the videos, Danvers finds that the lights went off in Clark's video, and concludes that Oliver may have been involved, as he had access to the emergency generator. Navarro and Peter once again go to question Oliver Tabaq but find that he left a few days ago. Navarro is devastated when she is informed that Julia has died, and she lets Peter go back to be with his family for dinner. Danvers visits Connelly (Christopher Eccleston) to talk about his plans, and he says that Danvers' behavior worsened since the death of her child, which causes her to angrily leave. As she drives, she goes off the road to avoid hitting a one-eyed polar bear.

Navarro angrily confronts the Lighthouse staff for not checking on Julia and in her rage, drives off to fight a man she previously arrested for abusing a woman, but she is brutally beaten by him and his colleagues. She goes to Qavvik (Joel Montgrand) for help, and he tends to her wounds. The following morning, she visits Danvers and tells her about Julia's death. She believes this to be a curse, which will eventually come to her. They leave when Peter reports that a man wearing Anne's parka is sighted near a dredging machine, into which they climb. Danvers discovers the man who seems to be Clark but is actually Otis (Klaus Tange). Otis dodges Danvers' questions, while Navarro sees a naked woman moving in the icy water down below and is then shaken after encountering the woman face-to-face near an illuminated Christmas tree. Otis then claims that Clark left for the "Night Country", also saying they all are in it now. Danvers finds Navarro sitting by the Christmas tree with ruptured eardrums.

== Production ==
=== Development ===
The episode was written by consulting producer Namsi Khan, executive producer Chris Mundy and executive producer Issa López, and directed by López. This marked Khan's first writing credit, Mundy's first writing credit, López's fourth writing credit, and López's fourth directing credit.

=== Writing ===
On Julia's death, Kali Reis explained the effect it will have on Navarro, "If it was just Navarro, she might go off the rails. Now, her sister's gone. Before, she had a little bit of [restraint], like, 'Let me not beat the total shit out of this guy.' Maybe, don't do that. But now?" She added, "She knew this day was going to come, and she just wanted to save her sister. She wanted her sister to be okay. But she knew she wasn't going to be, so she needs to feel that pain physically, that she knows her sister Julia's been going through her entire life."

== Reception ==
=== Viewers ===
The episode was watched by 0.722 million viewers, earning a 0.11 in the 18–49 rating demographics on the Nielsen Media Research ratings scale. This means that 0.11 percent of all households with televisions watched the episode. This was a 19% increase from the previous episode, which was watched by 0.602 million viewers with a 0.11 in the 18–49 demographics.

=== Critical reviews ===
"Part 4" received generally positive reviews from critics. The review aggregator website Rotten Tomatoes reported an 100% approval rating for the episode, based on 10 reviews.

Christina Izzo of The A.V. Club gave the episode an "A–" grade and wrote, "Four episodes into True Detective: Night Country and it’s getting increasingly harder to work it on out: how Navarro's visions and Danvers' past and the racial tensions of Ennis and Annie's pink parka and ice-cave systems and ruptured eardrums and Matthew McConaughey all connect and consolidate. It's a lot of ground to cover in just two more episodes, two less than the previous seasons. How will Night Country do it? Well, it’s a mystery."

Alan Sepinwall of Rolling Stone wrote, "what's impressive about the beginning of the season's second half is how Night Country manages to tell stories of characters being consumed by darkness without being consumed itself. It's not that the episode is a laugh riot, by any means. But there's juuuust enough weird humor in the margins to keep the endless night and bleak storyline from feeling too oppressive to watch." Ben Travers of IndieWire gave the episode a "B+" grade and wrote, "Last week, Navarro threw an orange into the night, only to have it come rolling back. This week, an orange rolled out from under his sister’s bed, ushering in Jules' demise. Now, Navarro is down. Danvers isn't far behind. And the dead's cries are unrelenting."

Erik Kain of Forbes wrote, "We're just endlessly bogged down in scene after scene of redundant dialogue and extraneous details that draw us away from the mystery and the main characters. It's all the worse because so much of it doesn't make sense and isn't very interesting." Coleman Spilde of The Daily Beast wrote, "It's Christmas Eve in Ennis, Alaska, and things are worse than ever. On the seventh consecutive day of darkness, the lack of sunlight is starting to get to everyone. Ennis' reputation for being a place where the dead keep their presence known long after they're gone is well-founded, considering that almost everyone is up to their eyeballs in grief and despair. But perhaps the worst part of this consuming feeling is that the entire cast of True Detective: Night Country seems to have too much pride to ask for help."

Amanda Whiting of Vulture gave the episode a 3 star rating out of 5 and wrote, "The episode ends with such menace that I was desperate to watch the next episode despite this one's faults." Melody McCune of Telltale TV gave the episode a 3.5 star rating out of 5 and wrote, "'Part 4' touches the surface of lingering narrative mysteries, such as Danvers' son and the questions surrounding his death. While it feels like we're no closer to getting those coveted answers, True Detective: Night Country is hell-bent on taking its time. Whether that will be to its detriment remains to be seen. For now, there's still enough to enjoy (particularly the performances and stunning views) as we see the light at the end of this narrative's tunnel."

Scott Tobias of The New York Times wrote, "As the season's showrunner, Issa López, and her writers start to bring the season to a close, there's already some evidence that the show has spread itself too thin, despite an abundance of laudable elements." Tyler Johnson of TV Fanatic gave the episode a 3.9 star rating out of 5 and wrote, "We're still intrigued, but four hours into this investigation, we can feel our curiosity beginning to flag."
