= Part 3 (True Detective) =

- True Detective episode
- Episode no.: Season 4 Episode 3
- Directed by: Issa López
- Story by: Issa López
- Teleplay by: Issa López; Alan Page Arriaga
- Cinematography by: Florian Hoffmeister
- Editing by: Brenna Rangott
- Original air date: January 28, 2024
- Running time: 59 minutes

Guest appearances
- L'xeis Diane Benson as Bee; Aka Niviâna as Julia Navarro; June Thiele as Nurse Ivy

Episode chronology
← Previous "Part 2"	Next → "Part 4"
- True Detective (season 4)

"Part 3", also known as "Night Country, Part 3", is the third episode of the fourth season of the American anthology crime drama television series True Detective. It is the 27th overall episode of the series and was written by executive producers Issa López and Alan Page Arriaga, from a story by López. It was first broadcast on HBO in the United States on January 28, 2024, and also was available on Max on the same date.

The season takes place in Ennis, Alaska, and follows detectives Liz Danvers and Evangeline Navarro as they investigate the disappearance of eight men who operate the Tsalal Arctic Research Station and vanish without a trace. While occasionally working together, Danvers and Navarro are not on good terms after an unresolved case, which was very personal for Navarro. In the episode, the past between Danvers and Navarro is explored, while the investigation into Anne's case continues.

According to Nielsen Media Research, the episode was seen by an estimated 0.602 million household viewers and gained a 0.11 ratings share among adults aged 18–49. The episode received positive reviews from critics, who praised the performances and character development, although some criticized the over-abundance of characters and lack of progress in the main storyline.

== Plot ==
Seven years prior, Navarro (Kali Reis) attempts to arrest Anne for trespassing and destruction of property at the Silver Sky mining factory. However, she allows Anne to continue with her work when the building is revealed to be a makeshift birthing clinic. After a tense delivery, in which Navarro takes part, Anne offers herself up for arrest.

In the present day, Hank (John Hawkes) enlists local hunters to aid in the search for Clark, despite Navarro's hope to take Clark in alive. Danvers (Jodie Foster) is informed that Anders Lund, the Tsalal worker that authorities found alive, had his remaining limb amputated. When Peter (Finn Bennett) once again asks about her past with Navarro, Danvers reveals their final case together involved a man named William Wheeler, a criminal with a violent past who assaulted his girlfriend and killed her. Though Danvers tells Peter that Wheeler committed suicide, a flashback suggests that Danvers and/or Navarro shot and killed Wheeler after arriving on the scene. Despite their past, Danvers has Navarro formally brought into the investigation. Navarro has strange visions while out on the ice during the hunt for Clark.

At the station, Danvers and Navarro investigate the evidence found in Clark's trailer. After finding blue hair dye on a picture of Anne, they question Anne's hairdresser and friend, Susan. She reveals that Anne accompanied her to Tsalal, where Anne bonded with Clark and asked for their relationship to be kept secret. Susan also dated a Tsalal member named Oliver Tagaq, whose name is not mentioned in the company records but resigned right before Anne's death. Susan informs Danvers and Navarro that she told Hank about Anne's relationship with Clark, leading to them confronting Hank over his negligence. Danvers fights with Leah (Isabella Star LaBlanc) after Leah attends an anti-mining rally, while Navarro finds Julia (Aka Niviâna) in the outskirts of the city after a colleague saw her in the midst of a breakdown.

Peter asks his cousin Vince (Vilhelm Neto), a veterinarian, to inspect the bodies. Vince says the six researchers appear to have died before freezing, suggesting fear-induced cardiac arrest. Danvers and Navarro visit Oliver (Lance Kramer) at a nomad camp, but he refuses to cooperate and threatens them with a shotgun after learning of the scientists' deaths. They return to Ennis when they receive word that Lund has awakened. Blind and wailing in fear, he says that they "woke her" and that she hunted them in the dark, claiming she is still there before the nurse sedates him. When Danvers leaves to break up a fight in the hallway, a heavily sedated Lund suddenly rises and addresses Navarro in a demonic voice. Lund says that her mother is waiting for her, and he salutes Navarro before suffering a fatal seizure. Peter tells Danvers and Navarro that he has unlocked Anne's cellphone, containing a video that shows a distraught Anne in an icy cave. Anne says she has found something before she is grabbed by an unseen force and screams.

== Production ==
=== Development ===
The episode was written by executive producers Issa López and Alan Page Arriaga, from a story by López, and directed by López. This marked López's third writing credit, Arriaga's first writing credit, and López's third directing credit.

=== Writing ===
López felt that it would work better for the story in slowly revealing the past of Danvers and Navarro, particularly in the cases of Anne and William Wheeler. She explained, "There was something yummy about not knowing the past, not seeing it and then discovering it slowly. What really happened there? What's the real story?" She said that the opening scene went through six different versions before shooting them, also adding "Then in the edit, we discovered that if we show this but don’t show this, and don't reveal this until the end... really, we were playing so much throughout [production]. There were so many ways to decide how much information you keep and how much information you give. It was a luxury that I was able to have because we stuck to the present. It was the right choice."

=== Filming ===
For the scene where Lund speaks with Navarro, Kali Reis commented on the prosthetics, "The special effects team, they just did such a great job. Like I knew he didn't have things missing and he wasn't frostbitten, but you could picture how it would smell if somebody had been in the hospital. It was so creepy."

== Reception ==
=== Viewers ===
The episode was watched by 0.602 million viewers, earning a 0.11 in the 18–49 rating demographics on the Nielsen Media Research ratings scale. This means that 0.11 percent of all households with televisions watched the episode. This was a 20% decrease from the previous episode, which was watched by 0.678 million viewers with a 0.09 in the 18–49 demographics.

=== Critical reviews ===
"Part 3" received positive reviews from critics. The review aggregator website Rotten Tomatoes reported an 91% approval rating for the episode, based on 11 reviews. The site's consensus states: "Light on fresh leads but heavy on nightmare fuel imagery, Night Country's third installment finally throws Jodie Foster and Kali Reis together in a partnership that generates compelling friction."

Christina Izzo of The A.V. Club gave the episode an "A–" grade and wrote, "At the halfway point of True Detective: Night Country, we're left with far more questions than answers. How is Navarro's mother connected to the Tsalal mystery? Where has Ray run off to and does he have ties to a certain cultish family? What's the meaning behind that recurring one-eyed polar bear? How has it taken this long for an HBO series to figure out how to light night scenes without making us question our eyesight? And, most importantly, exactly what does Liz Danvers' Tinder profile look like?"

Alan Sepinwall of Rolling Stone wrote, "the more that Issa López and company keep throwing out these hints of the otherworldly, the harder it may be for the mystery to be resolved in a wholly rational way. Whatever's waiting for Navarro, Danvers, and the rest, though, the journey has been riveting so far." Ben Travers of IndieWire gave the episode a "B–" grade and wrote, "Narratively speaking, hardships have to happen. The detectives can't just follow a neatly lined up trail of breadcrumbs to find who they're looking for. But dead-ends can be as frustrating for the audience as they are for the characters, and after an hour of grinding toward zero results, Episode 3 needs to end with a bang, so to speak."

Erik Kain of Forbes wrote, "Halfway in and I'm still not loving Night Country, even if this was better than last week and had some good spooky bits. The creepiest part wasn’t Vecna at the end, though. It was the murderer in the flashback. Whistling and grinning with the dead girl at his feet." Coleman Spilde of The Daily Beast wrote, "It's an abrupt ending, one that leaves us with more questions than it does with even minuscule scraps of answers. But considering the quote that appears before the first episode begins, it seems Ennis turning into bedlam during the sunless season is no coincidence. And everyone who has seen The Thing knows: Nothing good can come from toying with ancient ice."

Amanda Whiting of Vulture gave the episode a 4 star rating out of 5 and wrote, "If 'we were here before,' then maybe Matthew McConaughey's Rust was right in season one, too: 'Everything we have done or will do, we will do over and over and over again forever.' Maybe time really is a flat circle, or a spiral pressed into the skin." Melody McCune of Telltale TV gave the episode a 4 star rating out of 5 and wrote, "'Part 3' isn't the strongest episode of the bunch, but it patiently chips away at the narrative's central mystery while giving its leads more room to play. Flaws aside, the story is still exciting, and when the season hits those highs, it truly soars."

Scott Tobias of The New York Times wrote, "In perhaps the season's strongest hour to date, the episode moves the procedural elements forward as expected, but the one common thread is the tug Annie and the town’s Indigenous population has on the consciences of our two lead characters." Tyler Johnson of TV Fanatic gave the episode a 4.2 star rating out of 5 and wrote, "Against all odds, this multi-pronged approach has yielded compelling results thus far. But the show is reaching the point where it will need to stop introducing new wrinkles to the case and instead begin the process of gathering the existing elements into something more comprehensible."
