= True Detective season 4 =

Season of television series

True Detective: Night Country
- Season 4
- Promotional poster
- Showrunner: Issa López
- Starring: Jodie Foster; Kali Reis; Fiona Shaw; Finn Bennett; Isabella Star LaBlanc; John Hawkes; Christopher Eccleston
- No. of episodes: 6

Release
- Original network: HBO
- Original release: January 14 – February 18, 2024

Season chronology
- ← Previous; Season 3

The fourth season of True Detective, an American anthology crime drama television series created by Nic Pizzolatto, premiered on January 14, 2024, on HBO. Carrying the subtitle Night Country, the season is set in the fictional town of Ennis, Alaska, north of the Arctic Circle, during polar night. It follows the investigation of the disappearance of eight men from a research station. The season stars Jodie Foster and Kali Reis as Detectives Liz Danvers and Evangeline Navarro.

Night Country was created by Issa López, who serves as showrunner, writer, and director. It is the first season without the involvement of Pizzolatto; however, he is still credited as an executive producer. Night Country received widespread acclaim from critics and received the highest viewership for the entire series.

The show was ranked amongst the top 10 television programs of the year by the American Film Institute, and garnered 19 Primetime Emmy Award nominations, becoming the most nominated season in the series. Foster won for Outstanding Lead Actress, while its other nominations included Outstanding Limited or Anthology Series, Outstanding Supporting Actor (for Hawkes), Outstanding Supporting Actress (for Reis), Outstanding Directing and Writing (for Lopez). At the 82nd Golden Globe Awards, it received three nominations including for the Best Limited or Anthology Series or Television Film, with Foster winning Best Actress.

== Production ==
=== Development ===
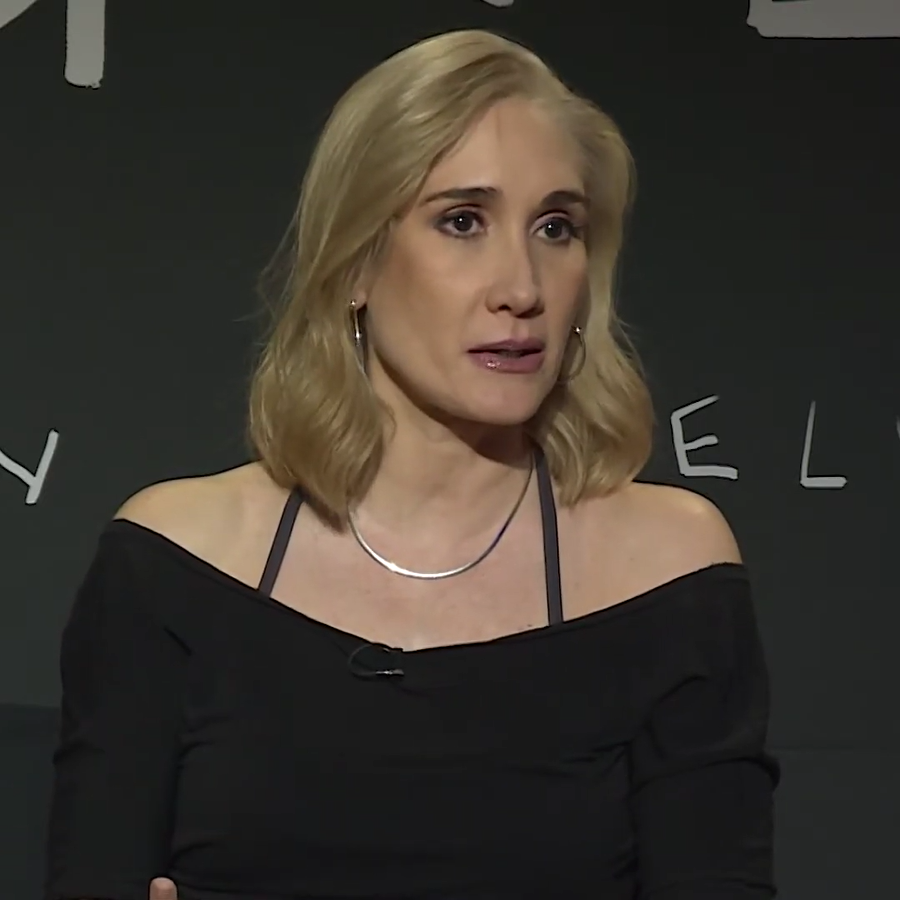
Issa López, showrunner for True Detective: Night Country

Initially, Nic Pizzolatto was directly involved in a fourth season of True Detective, but ultimately Issa López would be selected as showrunner, writing and directing the whole season. Pizzolatto remained as an executive producer, marking his first season without a writing credit.

Before the release of the third season, Pizzolatto explained that he had a "really, really wild" idea for a potential fourth season. After the season finished airing, he explained that he decided to drop his idea, intending to use a new idea after discussing the project with an unnamed actor. In July 2019, Casey Bloys, HBO president of programming, explained that "If Nic has an idea that he is excited about, we will talk about it but not rushing into anything."

In January 2020, Pizzolatto signed an overall production deal with Fox 21 Television Studios and FX Productions, putting into question his involvement in a potential fourth season. By the next year, HBO began exploring ideas for a fourth season with other writers, including Lucía Puenzo and Sam Levinson. Bloys later said, "There's something in the True Detective area, there's things we're feeling good about. I would say stay tuned on that one."

In March 2022, HBO announced that a fourth season had entered into development, which would carry a subtitle, Night Country, a first for the series. López would write and direct, and also executive produce the season alongside Barry Jenkins, Adele Romanski and Mark Ceryak. In June 2022, HBO officially greenlit the season, with López serving as showrunner.

When preparing season 4, subtitled Night Country, director and writer Issa López chose to create a "dark mirror" of the first season: "Where True Detective is male and it's sweaty, Night Country is cold and it's dark and it's female." In an interview with The A.V. Club, López credited John Carpenter's The Thing, the Overlook Hotel from The Shining, and the spacecraft Nostromo from Alien as inspiration. She said (to HBO), "Guys, me being who I am, I'm going to tap into that and go for it," referring to the supernatural elements of True Detective's first season; allusions to the fictional city of Carcosa and the Yellow King, both of which feature in the works of writer Robert W. Chambers. López has also cited the Dyatlov Pass incident and Mary Celeste as inspirations for the season.

Another inspiration was Billie Eilish's 2019 song "Bury a Friend", which López described as "such a dark, moody, fun, sinister little song that I thought it could absolutely work." It was used to score Night Country's title sequence. López started to listen to Eilish during the COVID-19 lockdown, when she wrote the season, and noticed how similar in theme "Bury a Friend"'s lyrics were. In a 2019 interview, Eilish said she wrote the song from the perspective of the monster under the bed. López was recorded to say "It's perfectly possible that the events of the show happened because I was listening to Billie."

=== Casting ===
In May 2022, Jodie Foster was confirmed to star in the season, marking her first adult TV role and her first starring role in a television series since her portrayal of Addie Loggins in Paper Moon in 1974. Foster described her character, chief Danvers, as awful; an "Alaska Karen".

In June 2022, it was reported that Kali Reis would join Foster as co-lead, in a role originally conceived as Latina and as a "hardass" military veteran.

In September 2022, it was reported that John Hawkes, Christopher Eccleston, Fiona Shaw, Finn Bennett, and Anna Lambe would also appear in the season. In October 2022, Aka Niviâna, Isabella Star LaBlanc and Joel D. Montgrand joined the season. Eccleston stated, "I'd never have taken such a small part if it wasn't for Jodie. [A]ll my scenes are with her, and she's been a heroine of mine for many years."

=== Filming ===
The season was filmed in Iceland and Alaska with a budget of $60 million. Filming began in November 2022 and wrapped in April 2023. The conditions included nighttime shoots at −23 °C (−9 °F), with director López commenting, "I'm Mexican, so I'm really not fond of the cold." She said that viewers would find the environment authentic "because we were there, because the actors were cold, because the filmmakers were cold."

== Cast ==
=== Main cast ===
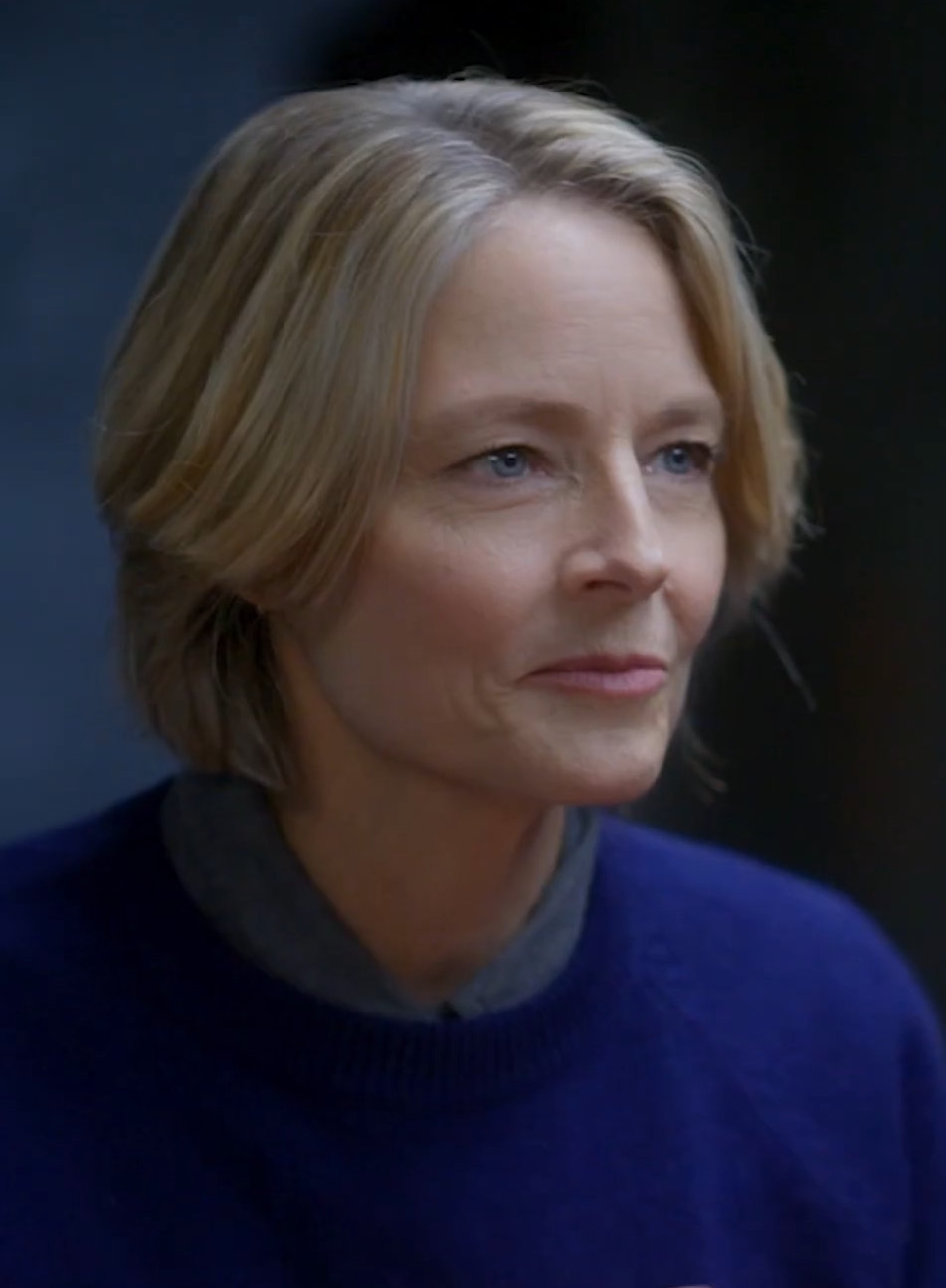
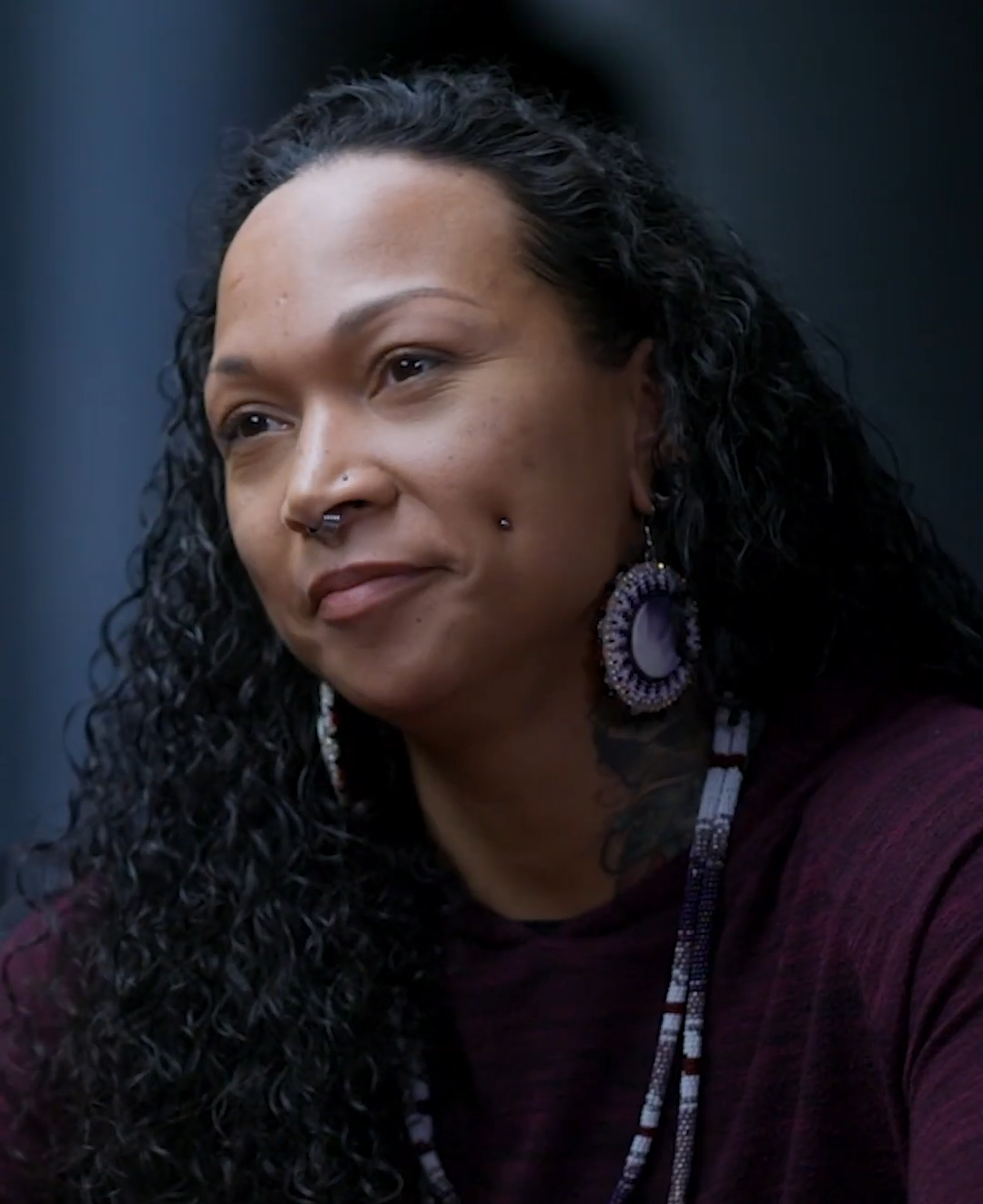
Jodie Foster and Kali Reis, who play the lead detectives
- Jodie Foster as Chief Liz Danvers
- Kali Reis as Trooper Evangeline Navarro
- Fiona Shaw as Rose Aguineau
- Finn Bennett as Officer Peter Prior
- Isabella Star LaBlanc as Leah Danvers
- Christopher Eccleston as Captain Ted Connelly
- John Hawkes as Captain Hank Prior

=== Recurring cast ===
- Dervla Kirwan as Kate McKitterick
- Anna Lambe as Kayla Malee
- L'xeis Diane Benson as Bee
- Aka Niviâna as Julia Navarro
- Joel D. Montgrand as Eddie Qavvik
- Owen McDonnell as Raymond Clark
- Nivi Pedersen as Annie Kowtok
- Erling Eliasson as Travis Cohle
- Donnie Keshawarz as science teacher Adam Bryce

== Episodes ==
No. overall	No. in season	Title	Directed by	Written by	Original release date	U.S. viewers (millions)
25	1	"Part 1"	Issa López	Issa López	January 14, 2024	0.565
In the remote town of Ennis, Alaska, eight scientists working at the Tsalal Research Station disappear, with a woman's severed tongue left at the scene. Local police chief Liz Danvers deduces that the tongue belonged to an Indigenous woman. Alaskan Native trooper Evangeline Navarro believes the victim to be Annie Kowtok, an Iñupiaq woman who was stabbed to death and her tongue cut out after protesting against the construction of a local mine; the case remains unsolved after six years, which Navarro blames on Danvers. Danvers uncovers photographic evidence of a relationship between Annie and Raymond Clark, one of the missing researchers, and returns to Tsalal, where she finds Navarro also inspecting the facility. The two argue over Annie's case until they are summoned to a frozen lake. Rose Aguineau, a woman living on the edge of town, has discovered the naked bodies of the researchers, frozen in a solid mass, with their clothes carefully folded on the snow.
26	2	"Part 2"	Issa López	Issa López	January 21, 2024	0.678
As authorities check on the corpses, Danvers discovers that the bodies have strange injuries, with burnt eyes, self-inflicted bite marks and ruptured ear drums. She also notices a spiral symbol on one victim's forehead but does not understand what it means. Danvers is suspicious as her superior Ted Connelly seems to want to hurry to close the case without a proper investigation. As they try to remove the bodies from the ice, one of the officers accidentally breaks a victim's arm off at the elbow. To the group's shock, the victim is still alive and screams in pain. They realize that Raymond Clark is not among the frozen corpses.
27	3	"Part 3"	Issa López	Story by : Issa López; Teleplay by : Issa López and Alan Page Arriaga	January 28, 2024	0.602
The frozen scientist dies without providing helpful information. While incompetent Deputy Hank Prior leads the search for Clark, his earnest son Deputy Peter Prior asks his mentor Chief Danvers about the murder-suicide case that drove a wedge between her and Navarro. Navarro and Danvers seek out a local hairdresser for insight on Annie -- which leads to a tip. Navarro's relationships with her on-again, off-again boyfriend and her beloved schizophrenic sister Julia are explored.
28	4	"Part 4"	Issa López	Namsi Khan and Chris Mundy and Issa López	February 4, 2024	0.722
When Julia's mental health struggles worsen, Navarro brings her to a local facility, promising that this time will be better. Plagued by terrifying visions of the dead, Julia walks out into the ocean and dies by suicide. Later, Navarro has visions of her sister which she cannot distinguish from reality. Danvers and Navarro confirm the location of Annie's murder. Danvers struggles in her relationship with her Iñupiaq stepdaughter Leah, who wants to explore her Native heritage, despite Danvers' disapproval. Peter Prior's relationships with his father and young wife Kayla are severely strained as he knows Hank is corrupt and he has little time to spend at home, leaving his wife alone with their baby.
29	5	"Part 5"	Issa López	Katrina Albright & Wenonah Wilms and Chris Mundy & Issa López	February 11, 2024 (Note: The fifth episode was released online on HBO's streaming service on February 9, and released on normal broadcast television on February 11, 2024, as a result of having to air opposite Super Bowl LVIII.)	0.371
As Peter digs into the links between Tsalal and mining company Silver Sky, Navarro rescues Leah from a local protest that has turned violent. At a meeting with Silver Sky executive Kate McKitterick and Ted Connelly, Danvers is warned not to pursue the case any further. Danvers' suspicions about her supervisor are confirmed, so she brings a potential witness, Otis Heiss, to her home to keep him away from Connelly. Hank is sent to murder Heiss and turns his gun on Danvers but Peter shoots his father before he can murder Danvers too. Peter is left behind to conceal the killings while Danvers and Navarro rush to find ice caves that hold evidence of Annie's murder.
30	6	"Part 6"	Issa López	Issa López	February 18, 2024	0.983
Danvers and Navarro find the hidden underground lab where Annie was murdered, connected by tunnels to the Tsalal scientific facility. They capture missing scientist Raymond Clark, Annie's former lover. Clark confesses Annie discovered the facility's bogus pollution data and destroyed their secret research. All the other scientists took part in stabbing Annie, but it was Clark who finally smothered her to death. Clark dies by suicide before he can provide more evidence. Peter disposes of Hank's body with Rose's help. Danvers falls through ice into the ocean below, but Navarro saves her. Danvers and Navarro find evidence linking a Tsalal cleaning lady and Indigenous women workers from the local crab factory to the researchers' attack. The women admit that they discovered the secret lab and avenged Annie's killing by forcing the researchers out into the cold. Danvers and Navarro close the case, citing natural causes for the researchers' deaths. Danvers leaks a video left to her by Navarro in which Clark exposes the Silver Sky mine's pollution. Months later, Danvers is questioned about Otis Heiss's murder, with Hank as the prime suspect. When they ask her about Navarro's whereabouts, Danvers claims she has no idea where she is.

== Release ==
A first look was unveiled in December 2022 during an HBO sizzle reel. In April 2023, the first trailer for the season was released.

The fourth season premiered on January 14, 2024. It was originally intended to premiere in 2023.

In the United Kingdom and Ireland, it premiered on Sky Atlantic on January 15, 2024.

== Reception ==
=== Critical response ===
On Rotten Tomatoes, the season has an approval rating of 93% based on 210 reviews. The website's critics consensus reads: "Frighteningly atmospheric and anchored by Jodie Foster and Kali Reis' superb performances, Night Country is a fresh and frosty variation on True Detective's existential themes." On Metacritic, the season has a weighted average score of 81 out of 100 based on 48 critics, indicating "universal acclaim".

David Bianculli of NPR deemed Night Country the best entry of True Detective since season one, comparing its focus on the direction, mood, acting and writing. USA Today's Kelly Lawler agreed, saying it is "as excellent as, and perhaps transcends, that striking first season a decade ago." Lucy Mangan of The Guardian deemed Night Country the best season of True Detective, writing, "At last, this show drops the bloated, male-dominated stories of earlier series for an icy murder case in Alaska – with blistering turns from Foster and Kali Reis." Caryn James wrote for the BBC that Lopez "created a fierce, absorbing, richly imagined new show of her own." In the Slant Magazine review, Ross McIndoe sums up: "Like the best seasons of True Detective, Night Country thrives on its ability to exist as both a brisk, thrilling genre piece and a weighty, philosophical drama."

Inkoo Kang writing for The New Yorker considers the season to be "a feminist revision of a series best known for its macho poetry and its ogling eye" and that López "transforms True Detective from a lot of mystical mumbling into a show with something to say". Alison Herman of Variety wrote that Lopez's take on the anthology series invigorated the "hardened female cop in a blue-collar community" archetype by placing it in a new context. Kristen Baldwin of Entertainment Weekly praised Foster's performance for eschewing cliché and rendering a "mesmerizing and often-hilarious antihero."

Adam Graham of The Detroit News commended Foster's "full detective mode" performance and the contrast offered by Reis but wrote, "Some of its supernatural underpinnings lead to dead ends and López is sometimes at odds with herself over the direction of her storytelling." CNN's Brian Lowry similarly felt the performances and chemistry between Foster and Reis worked "reasonably well", but criticized the slow pacing as the season's ultimate failure.

In a mixed review, Mike Hale of The New York Times wrote: "The mystery steadily dissolves into preposterousness, the characters sink into incoherence, and the horror isn't original or evocative enough to carry things on its own." Dylan Roth of Observer.com wrote, "While Night Country offers plenty of intrigue on the macro level, the individual characters and relationships are more grim than they are engaging. Everyone has texture, but no one has chemistry." Nina Metz of the Chicago Tribune believed the "blunt" traits of the leads were ultimately "stand-ins for character development".

Nic Pizzolatto received attention for his criticism of the fourth season. He described its connections to earlier seasons as "so stupid", and wrote on his social media that viewers "can't blame me" for its perceived weaknesses. He subsequently deleted these comments, but later reiterated the sentiment by sharing several negative reviews of the season finale from other social media users. This prompted The Guardian's Paul MacInnes to describe Pizzolatto as "throwing a tantrum over his own show," while Vulture writer Roxana Hadadi responded by noting that season 4's critical reception was broadly more positive than Pizzolatto's own seasons 2 and 3. Responding to Pizzolatto's negative comments, showrunner López stated:

I wrote this with profound love for the work he made and love for the people that loved it. And it is a reinvention, and it is different, and it's done with the idea of sitting down around the fire, and [let's] have some fun and have some feelings and have some thoughts. And anybody that wants to join is welcome.

=== Accolades ===
Award	Category	Nominee(s)	Result	Ref.
Artios Awards	Outstanding Achievement in Casting – Limited Series	Francine Maisler, Amber Wakefield, Molly Rose, Jessica Ronane, and Deborah Schildt	Nominated	
Astra TV Awards	Best Limited Series	True Detective: Night Country	Nominated	
Astra TV Awards	Best Actress in a Limited Series or TV Movie	Jodie Foster	Nominated	
Astra TV Awards	Best Supporting Actor in a Limited Series or TV Movie	Finn Bennett	Nominated	
Astra TV Awards	Best Supporting Actor in a Limited Series or TV Movie	Christopher Eccleston	Nominated	
Astra TV Awards	Best Supporting Actress in a Limited Series or TV Movie	Kali Reis	Nominated	
Astra TV Awards	Best Directing in a Limited Series or TV Movie	Issa López	Nominated	
Astra TV Awards	Best Writing in a Limited Series or TV Movie	Issa López	Nominated	
British Academy Television Awards	Best International Programme	Production Team	Nominated	
British Academy Television Craft Awards	Best Sound: Fiction	Howard Bargroff, Stephen Griffiths, Tom Jenkins, Andy Shelley, Mark Timms, and Michele Woods	Nominated	
Cinema Audio Society Awards	Outstanding Achievement in Sound Mixing for Television Series – One Hour	Skuli Helgi Sigurgislason, Howard Bargoff, Mark Timms, Goetz Botzenhardt, Nick Kray, Keith Partridge (for "Part 6")	Nominated	
Critics' Choice Television Awards	Best Limited Series	True Detective: Night Country	Nominated	
Critics' Choice Television Awards	Best Actress in a Limited Series or Movie Made for Television	Jodie Foster	Nominated	
Critics' Choice Television Awards	Best Supporting Actress in a Limited Series or Movie Made for Television	Kali Reis	Nominated	
Critics' Choice Super Awards	Best Horror Series, Limited Series or Made-for-TV Movie	True Detective: Night Country	Nominated	
Critics' Choice Super Awards	Best Actress in a Horror Series, Limited Series or Made-for-TV Movie	Jodie Foster	Won	
Directors Guild of America Awards	Outstanding Directorial Achievement in Dramatic Series	Issa López (for "Part 6")	Nominated	
Golden Globe Awards	Best Limited or Anthology Series or Television Film	True Detective: Night Country	Nominated	
Golden Globe Awards	Best Actress – Miniseries or Television Film	Jodie Foster	Won	
Golden Globe Awards	Best Supporting Actress – Series, Miniseries or Television Film	Kali Reis	Nominated	
Ivor Novello Awards	Best Television Soundtrack	Vince Pope	Won	
Primetime Emmy Awards	Outstanding Limited or Anthology Series	Issa López, Mari Jo Winkler-Ioffreda, Jodie Foster, Barry Jenkins, Adele Romanski, Mark Ceryak, Chris Mundy, Nic Pizzolatto, Matthew McConaughey, Woody Harrelson, Steve Golin, Richard Brown, Cary Joji Fukunaga, Alan Page Arriaga, Princess Daazhraii Johnson, Cathy Tagnak Rexford, Layla Blackman, and Sam Breckman	Nominated	
Primetime Emmy Awards	Outstanding Lead Actress in a Limited or Anthology Series or Movie	Jodie Foster	Won	
Primetime Emmy Awards	Outstanding Supporting Actor in a Limited or Anthology Series or Movie	John Hawkes (for "Part 5")	Nominated	
Primetime Emmy Awards	Outstanding Supporting Actress in a Limited or Anthology Series or Movie	Kali Reis (for "Part 4")	Nominated	
Primetime Emmy Awards	Outstanding Directing for a Limited or Anthology Series or Movie	Issa López	Nominated	
Primetime Emmy Awards	Outstanding Writing for a Limited or Anthology Series or Movie	Issa López (for "Part 6")	Nominated	
Primetime Creative Arts Emmy Awards	Outstanding Casting for a Limited or Anthology Series or Movie	Francine Maisler, Deborah Schildt, and Alda B. Gudjónsdóttir	Nominated	
Primetime Creative Arts Emmy Awards	Outstanding Cinematography for a Limited or Anthology Series or Movie	Florian Hoffmeister (for "Part 6")	Nominated	
Primetime Creative Arts Emmy Awards	Outstanding Contemporary Costumes for a Limited or Anthology Series or Movie	Alex Bovaird, Linda Gardar, Rebekka Jónsdóttir, Tina Ulee, Giulia Moschioni, and Brian Sprouse (for "Part 5")	Nominated	
Primetime Creative Arts Emmy Awards	Outstanding Contemporary Makeup (Non-Prosthetic)	Peter Swords King, Natalie Abizadeh, Kerry Skelton, Flóra Karítas Buenaño, and Hafdís Pálsdóttir (for "Part 5")	Nominated	
Primetime Creative Arts Emmy Awards	Outstanding Prosthetic Makeup	Dave Elsey, Lou Elsey, and Brian Kinney (for "Part 3")	Nominated	
Primetime Creative Arts Emmy Awards	Outstanding Original Music and Lyrics	"No Use" (for "Part 5"); Music and Lyrics by John Hawkes	Nominated	
Primetime Creative Arts Emmy Awards	Outstanding Music Supervision	Susan Jacobs (for "Part 4")	Nominated	
Primetime Creative Arts Emmy Awards	Outstanding Picture Editing for a Limited or Anthology Series or Movie	Matt Chessé (for "Part 4")	Nominated	
Primetime Creative Arts Emmy Awards	Outstanding Picture Editing for a Limited or Anthology Series or Movie	Brenna Rangott (for "Part 6")	Nominated	
Primetime Creative Arts Emmy Awards	Outstanding Production Design for a Narrative Contemporary Program (One Hour or More)	Daniel Taylor, Jo Riddell, and Charlotte Dirickx	Nominated	
Primetime Creative Arts Emmy Awards	Outstanding Sound Editing for a Limited or Anthology Series, Movie or Special	Martín Hernández, Stephen Griffiths, Tom Jenkins, Michele Woods, Andy Shelley, Jake Fielding, Stuart Bagshaw, Barnaby Smyth, Rebecca Glover, and Ben Smithers (for "Part 6")	Nominated	
Primetime Creative Arts Emmy Awards	Outstanding Sound Mixing for a Limited or Anthology Series or Movie	Howard Bargroff, Mark Timms, Skúli Helgi Sigurgíslason, and Keith Partridge (for "Part 6")	Nominated	
Primetime Creative Arts Emmy Awards	Outstanding Special Visual Effects in a Single Episode	Barney Curnow, Jan Guilfoyle, Eggert "Eddi" Ketilsson, Simon Stanley-Clamp, Manuel Reyes Halaby, Tiago Faria, Panos Theodoropoulos, Cale Pugh, and Tim Zaccheo (for "Part 1")	Nominated	
Producers Guild of America Awards	David L. Wolper Award for Outstanding Producer of Limited Series Television	Issa López, Mari Jo Winkler-Ioffreda, Jodie Foster, Barry Jenkins, Adele Romanski, Mark Ceryak, Chris Mundy, Sam Breckman, Alan Page Arriaga, Princess Daazhraii Johnson, Cathy Tagnak Rexford, and Layla Blackman	Nominated	
Saturn Awards	Best Action / Thriller Television Series	True Detective: Night Country	Nominated	
Saturn Awards	Best Actress in a Television Series	Jodie Foster	Nominated	
Satellite Awards	Best Actress in a Miniseries, Limited Series, or Motion Picture Made for Television	Jodie Foster	Nominated	
Screen Actors Guild Awards	Outstanding Performance by a Female Actor in a Miniseries or Television Movie	Jodie Foster	Nominated	
Television Critics Association Awards	Outstanding Achievement in Drama	True Detective: Night Country	Nominated	
Television Critics Association Awards	Individual Achievement in Drama	Jodie Foster	Nominated	
Writers Guild of America Awards	Limited Series	Katrina Albright, Alan Page Arriaga, Namsi Khan, Issa López, Chris Mundy, and Wenonah Wilms	Nominated	

== See also ==
- List of Primetime Emmy Awards received by HBO
