= Part 6 (True Detective) =

- True Detective episode
- Episode no.: Season 4 Episode 6
- Directed by: Issa López
- Written by: Issa López
- Cinematography by: Florian Hoffmeister
- Editing by: Brenna Rangott
- Original air date: February 18, 2024
- Running time: 75 minutes

Guest appearances
- Owen McDonnell as Raymond Clark; Anna Lambe as Kayla Prior; Nivi Pedersen as Annie Kowtok; L'xeis Diane Benson as Bee; June Thiele as Nurse Ivy

Episode chronology
← Previous "Part 5"	Next → —
- True Detective (season 4)

"Part 6", also known as "Night Country, Part 6", is the sixth episode and season finale of the fourth season of the American anthology crime drama television series True Detective. It is the 30th overall episode of the series and was written and directed by executive producer Issa López. It was first broadcast on HBO in the United States on February 18, 2024, and was also available on Max on the same date.

The season takes place in Ennis, Alaska, and follows detectives Liz Danvers and Evangeline Navarro as they investigate the disappearance of eight men who operate the Tsalal Arctic Research Station and vanish without a trace. While occasionally working together, Danvers and Navarro are not on good terms after an unresolved case, which was very personal for Navarro. In the episode, Danvers and Navarro get trapped on Tsalal during a snow storm, where they conclude their investigations on the scientists and Anne.

According to Nielsen Media Research, the episode was seen by an estimated 0.983 million household viewers and gained a 0.19 ratings share among adults aged 18–49. The episode received mostly positive reviews from critics, who praised the performances, closure and tension. However, some criticized the lack of answers to many of the storylines, with many divided over the episode's ambiguity.

== Plot ==
Amidst the storm, Danvers (Jodie Foster) and Navarro (Kali Reis) enter the caves. As Navarro wants to get through a blockade, they fall through the ground to a lower level of the cave. Navarro spots Clark and follows him, discovering an underground laboratory. Navarro and Danvers see the spiral symbol is represented on the ceiling. They discover a secret passageway that leads to Tsalal.

As they inspect Tsalal, Clark attacks them, but they overpower him and torture him by making him listen to Annie's last video. He finally confesses that Annie discovered their plan to find the DNA of an extinct micro-organism that could stop cellular deterioration and provide a cure for many diseases, which had been frozen in the permafrost, which was softened thanks to the pollution caused by Silver Sky. By faking the toxicity records, they found the microorganism and hoped the pollution would continue to make their job easier. He and the rest of the scientists found Lund stabbing Annie after he found her destroying their underground research facility, with the rest of the scientists helping him. He then strangled Annie when she wouldn't stop screaming.

Peter (Finn Bennett) disposes of the bodies of Hank and Otis. When Leah (Isabella Star LaBlanc) arrives, he asks her to be with Kayla (Anna Lambe) so she does not spend New Year's Eve alone, and drives her back. Noticing him as he is about to leave, Kayla questions Peter about the case. He says he will complete one last task before returning to her. She kisses him, asking him to come back to her. He takes Hank's body to Rose (Fiona Shaw), who helps in disposing of it by tipping it into the waters below the ice.

As Danvers leaves the room, her conversation with Navarro reveals that the latter shot Wheeler, with Danvers suggesting she was considering doing it herself. Clark then claims that Annie came back to life to kill the scientists, prompting him to hide in the passageway for several weeks. He asks Navarro to put him out of his misery; she takes him out of the station to freeze to death. This angers Danvers, as he was their only witness. When the power is cut off, they struggle to keep themselves alive in the station. Navarro starts hearing voices, and even sees Clark again. After an argument with Danvers, Navarro walks off into the outskirts and imagines reuniting with Julia. Danvers goes looking for her, but sees her son trapped under the ice beneath her. The ice shatters and Danvers almost drowns, until Navarro pulls her out and takes her back to Tsalal. Navarro claims she saw Danvers' son, who wanted to tell her that he sees her.

The storm passes, and Navarro opens up to Danvers about her struggles. When she mentions the hatch in the passageway, Danvers uses UV lights to reveal fingerprints on the hatch. Recognizing them as belonging to female employees of Tsalal, they head out to question Beatrice and Blair, who are living with other employees. The women reveal that they discovered the hatch and underground laboratory while cleaning, and they did not tell the police because they believed nothing would change. The employees decided to take the scientists by gunpoint and forced them to go out into the outskirts naked, believing that Annie took care of them. They claim this is just "another story", and Danvers and Navarro decide to officially deem the Tsalal men's death an accident, closing the case.

On May 12, Danvers is questioned over Hank's disappearance. She reports that Hank killed Otis and that the police are still looking for Hank. Navarro has vanished from Ennis. Clark's confession has caused Silver Sky to be closed. Danvers and Leah have reconciled, and Peter now spends more time with his family. When Danvers is asked about the veracity of the sightings of Navarro, she replies, "This is Ennis. Nobody ever really leaves." The last shot shows Danvers sitting in a house overlooking a lake, with Navarro nearby on the deck.

== Production ==
=== Development ===
The episode was written and directed by executive producer Issa López. This marked López's sixth writing and directing credit.

=== Writing ===
López hoped that viewers would decide their own interpretation, saying "In this season, we can decide that these men walked onto the ice, the pressure dropped because there was a sudden blizzard, and their body temperature dropped so fast they developed delirium and died. Or, there was something in the dark. It's for you to decide." She added, "[Not revealing the tongue] was a fight, because so many people working with me were like, ‘No, really? You’re not going to give that to us?’ And you know, in life, you don't always get all the answers. Some of them are for you to figure out. I'm not going to do all the homework on my own for you." Kali Reis commented, "I'm totally Team Navarro. I totally believe it. Whoever she is, Shorty awake and Shorty mad. She did that. She’s handling business."

When questioned over the final scene, López said, "For me as an audience member, Navarro is alive. She went out and had her walkabout in a way in the ice, because now she can do that, and find a way back. But it is true that no one ever leaves Ennis... or anywhere." Reis said, "I think she just goes off into a place where she can be herself without any responsibilities. And if she did either walk into the ice like her sister or stay around, the only person she would ever come back to see, whether it's in the spirit world or physical world, would be Danvers."

== Reception ==
=== Viewers ===
The episode was watched by 0.983 million viewers, earning a 0.19 in the 18–49 rating demographics on the Nielsen Media Research ratings scale. This means that 0.19 percent of all households with televisions watched the episode. This was a massive increase of 164% from the previous episode, which was watched by 0.371 million viewers with a 0.04 in the 18–49 demographics.

=== Critical reviews ===
"Part 6" received mostly positive reviews from critics. The review aggregator website Rotten Tomatoes reported an 83% approval rating for the episode, based on 12 reviews. The site's consensus states: "True Detective: Night Country's finale ends the season in satisfying fashion, albeit on a note that may frustrate viewers annoyed by ambiguity."

Christina Izzo of The A.V. Club gave the episode an "A–" grade and wrote, "We won't deny, we doubted showrunner Issa López leading into this last episode, given all of the stray storylines and perplexing theories that still needed tying up. However, with the final edition of her Night Country saga, López has honored her vision while still making this chapter feel very much a part of the greater True Detective universe."

Alan Sepinwall of Rolling Stone wrote, "There will almost certainly be another story, whether López tells it, or Pizzolatto returns, or someone new ends up in charge. Whoever it is, and whenever it comes, a new standard has been set for how strongly a True Detective case can be closed." Ben Travers of IndieWire gave the episode a "B+" grade and wrote, "After five years off the air and with a new creative team in place, True Detective Season 4 set out to continue the franchise while reimagining what it could be. That's a lot to take on, but like the finale itself, Night Country pulled it off. Bring on Season 5."

Coleman Spilde of The Daily Beast wrote, "It was not a perfect season, but its place in the series makes it a fascinating study for fans to continue pondering long after its end." Amanda Whiting of Vulture gave the episode a perfect 5 star rating out of 5 and wrote, "In the end, how gratifying you find the finale will depend on your willingness to forgo objective truth in favor of a notion more slippery and less satisfying. That there can be more than one answer to even the most straightforward question: Whodunnit?" Scott Tobias of The New York Times wrote, "Even after tying up all the loose ends, López holds onto the idea of Ennis as a place where ghosts commune with the living, whether through fevered hallucinations or lingering guilt that flourishes in the dark like a mushroom."

Other reviews were more negative. Tyler Johnson of TV Fanatic gave the episode a 2.5 star rating out of 5 and wrote, "The show deserves to be lauded for its performances and the memorable visuals it mined from the frigid darkness, but its conclusion was as frustrating as an abandoned cold case." Aja Romano of Vox wrote, "The downgrade from Pizzolatto's season one craft to the clunky sophomoric writing of season four was probably avoidable. If Night Country had just been allowed to be its own thing, without any pressure to either live up to season one or abide by its Weird parameters, it probably would have been a much better show. We can't fault HBO for wanting to revive one of its best franchises. But Night Country may ultimately go down as a reminder that sometimes it's best to let sleeping eldritch creations lie."

Akos Peterbencze of Paste wrote, "Ultimately, the failure of Season 4 isn't that it couldn't live up to its superior debut season, but that it never actually had any ambition to swing for the fences and attempt to be something different. And while there's nothing wrong with paying homage, empty dialogue, cheap nihilism, and pretentious characters aren't the way."

=== Accolades ===
TVLine named Jodie Foster as the "Performer of the Week" for the week of February 24, 2024, for her performance in the episode. The site wrote, "Foster has been a marvel all season long on HBO’s chilly crime drama, with the two-time Oscar winner crafting an unforgettable portrait of a woman who's much better at hunting for clues than connecting with other human beings. The season finale finally cracked through police chief Liz Danvers' tough exterior to show us the pain she’s been privately holding onto for years, and Foster was magnificent as she shared that private pain with us."
