= Scott Stephens =

American television producer

- Occupations: Executive Producer, supervising producer, television producer
- Writing career
- Notable works: True Detective, Deadwood

Scott Stephens is an American television producer. He is an executive producer of True Detective and served as supervising producer on the western drama Deadwood, for which he was nominated for an Emmy Award.
