= Richard Brown (producer) =

Scottish television and film producer

Richard Brown is a Scottish film and television producer based in New York and London whose credits include True Detective, Catch-22, Outlaw King, This England and 44 Inch Chest.

== Career ==
Brown started his career as a talent scout for Island Records in London. In 1997, he relocated to the U.S. and transitioned into the film business working at Nick Wechsler and Keith Addis’ Industry Entertainment, and subsequently Chris Blackwell's Palm Pictures. During this period Brown produced Directors Label Series with Spike Jonze, Michel Gondry, Jonathan Glazer, and Chris Cunningham.

From 2006 to 2019, Brown operated under an overall deal with Steve Golin's production company, Anonymous Content—working side by side with Golin on initiating and executing the company's expansion into TV. During this time, Brown developed and produced True Detective, Outlaw King, and Catch-22. True Detective received eleven Primetime Emmy nominations heading into the 2014 Emmy season, scooping up five wins. True Detective utilized a "revolutionary" format in which all episodes were written by a single writer, Nic Pizzolatto, and director, Cary Fukunaga. Reviewers cited the show as one of the strongest programs in recent memory, with The Atlantic calling it "the most compelling series currently on television" with "an anthology format that has the potential to help change the way high-end television is produced."

Brown has executive produced all four seasons of True Detective with season five due to shoot in 2026.

The concept for the Catch-22 originated after the first season of True Detective, when Brown sat down with Luke Davies and David Michôd to discuss possible properties that they would like to adapt in a similar limited series format. Davies brought up Heller's novel, which the trio agreed would benefit from a longer treatment. Davies and Michôd co-wrote the adaptation, which Brown developed at Anonymous. Michôd was originally set to direct until he became unavailable and the producers asked George Clooney to come on board to direct, star and executive producer. The series shot in Sardinia and Rome in 2018 and starred Christopher Abbott, Kyle Chandler, Hugh Laurie and Lewis Pullman as well as Clooney. The series earned threeGolden Globe Awards nominations, including Best Television Limited Series or Motion Picture Made for Television.

In 2019, Brown launched his own production company, Passenger, and entered into an overall deal with Fremantle. In 2021, Brown executive produced the 6 episode limited series, This England, detailing the United Kingdom’s response to the COVID-19 pandemic. Michael Winterbottom wrote and directed the series, and Kenneth Branagh played Boris Johnson. The series takes viewers inside the halls of power, as Johnson (Branagh) grapples with Covid-19, Brexit, and a controversial personal and political life. It was released on September 28, 2022, to wide acclaim across the more than 90 countries in which it was released, as well as being Sky’s most successful original series launch of the year.

In 2022, Passenger produced a documentary series telling the story of the launch and inaugural season of the NBA's Basketball Africa League, a new Pan African basketball league which is setting out to create an elite sports ecosystem across the African Continent. Brown executive produced, wrote and co-directed (along with South African director Tebogo Malope). Oscar winning filmmaker Ezra Edelman (O.J.: Made In America), Toronto Raptors president Masai Ujiri, Oscar winning director and producer Fisher Stevens and acclaimed Nigerian filmmaker Akin Omotoso also serve as executive producers on the 4 part series. The series was invited to premiere at the Toronto International Film Festival in September 2025 and the premiere screening included a Q&A with Brown alongside Joakim Noah, Amadou Gallo Fall and Masai Ujiri. On the eve of the Toronto premiere ESPN acquired the North American broadcast rights and subsequently released the series on February 11 2026. The US premiere was held at the NBA All Star Weekend in Los Angeles and hosted by the NBA Players Association. https://variety.com/2025/film/markets-festivals/espn-origin-the-story-of-the-basketball-africa-league-1236511653/

In December 2022, after three and a half years Fremantle acquired Passenger for an undisclosed amount. Brown will continue to head up Passenger while additionally taking on a new role collaborating with the various production companies and filmmakers within Fremantle's Global Drama group.

== Producer filmography ==
- 2003-2005: Directors Label
- 2009: 44 Inch Chest
- 2013: Breakup at a Wedding
- 2018: Outlaw King
- 2014–2026: True Detective
- 2019: Catch-22
- 2022: This England
- 2026: Origin : The Story Of The Basketball Africa League
