= Joel Montgrand =

Cree First Nations actor from Canada

- Born: La Ronge, Saskatchewan, Canada
- Occupations: Actor; podcaster
- Known for: Avatar: The Last Airbender; True Detective

Joel Montgrand is a Cree First Nations actor and podcaster from the Peter Ballantyne Cree Nation in Canada. He's known for his appearances in the live-action shows Avatar: The Last Airbender and True Detective.

== Career ==
In June 2022, Montgrand joined season 4 of True Detective. He was later cast as Hakoda in the 2024 series Avatar: The Last Airbender.

In November 2023, Montgrand launched a podcast titled Actors and Ancestors, which "celebrates Indigenous actors, talks back to Hollywood stereotypes and looks to the future of Indigenous Peoples on screen".

== Filmography ==
Year	Title	Role	Notes
2011	La Fontaine	David K	TV Movie
2012	Ninja King	Aran	Short
2014	Bates Motel	Guard (Jodi's)	Episode: "Meltdown"
2015	Average Dicks	Bradley	4 episodes
2016	Birth of the Dragon	Sheriff Deputy Roy	
2016	Oil	Uncle Pete	Short
2016	Happy Medium	Brad	TV Movie
2016	I Love You So Much It's Killing Them	Man in Watch Ad	Short
2016	StrawMan	Clay	Short
2016	iZombie	Todd Hulce	Episode "Method Head"
2016	Girlfriends' Guide to Divorce	Date #1	Episode "Rule #14: No Means... No"
2016	Damn You	Boyfriend	Video
2017	A Bundle of Trouble: An Aurora Teagarden Mystery	Bartender	TV Movie
2018	Eldritch	Lewis Theobald	Short
2018	Legends of Tomorrow	Sheriff	Episode "Amazing Grace"
2018	Altered Carbon	Meditech 3	Episode "Out of the Past"
2019	Hey Cuzzin	Sheldon	TV short
2019	One Nightstand	Jason	Short
2019	Labyrinth Life	Xenon	Short
2019	Rise in Darkness	Thomas	Short
2020	Fatal Vows	Brian	Season 7 Episode 11 "Flirting with Murder"
2020	Beans	Kania'tariio	
2021	Doomsday Mom	Arizona Cop	TV Movie
2022	SlashFM	Man in Watch ad	segment "I Love You So Much It's Killing Them"
2023	True Detective	Eddie Qavvik	Season 4
2024	Avatar the Last Airbender	Chief Hakoda	Episode: "Spirited Away"
2025	Sweet Summer Pow Wow	Luke	
