= Isabella Star LaBlanc =

American actress

Isabella Star LaBlanc (born 2 January 1997) is an American actress and writer.

== Personal life ==
LaBlanc is a citizen of the Sisseton Wahpeton Dakota Oyate. She was born in Saint Paul, Minnesota and attended St. Paul Academy. LaBlanc is married. When traveling for work, she takes cotton fabric with her to use in a traditional tobacco tying practice.

== Career ==
Her first acting role was at the SteppingStone Theatre at eight years old. She subsequently performed in a number of plays in Minnesota, such as in The Wolves at the Jungle Theater as a teenager and Is Edward Snowden Single? in 2020. In 2019, she drew attention for her performance as Tiger Lily in the play Peter Pan and Wendy at the Shakespeare Theatre Company in Washington, DC. She has also written a number of short performance works and a script ("Writing A War Novel").

In 2021, LaBlanc received a Princess Grace Award, nominated by the McCarter Theatre. The same year, her work as an audiobook narrator for the young adult novel Firekeeper's Daughter was praised by Booklist, which called it a "sensitive reading." On film, LaBlanc has appeared in Long Slow Exhale and a prequel Pet Sematary: Bloodlines. In 2022, LaBlanc was cast in the fourth season of True Detective on HBO; Glamour magazine described LaBlanc and Anna Lambe as the "heart and soul" of the season.

In 2026, LaBlanc portrayed Jo March and Louisa May Alcott in the Guthrie Theater's adaptation of Little Women. Her performance was positively reviewed; the Pioneer Press wrote that the role was "an exquisitely crafted combination of charismatic and disarmingly natural."
