= Taproot Theatre Company =

Nonprofit theatre company in Seattle, Washington, US

Coordinates: 47.690612°N 122.356464°W

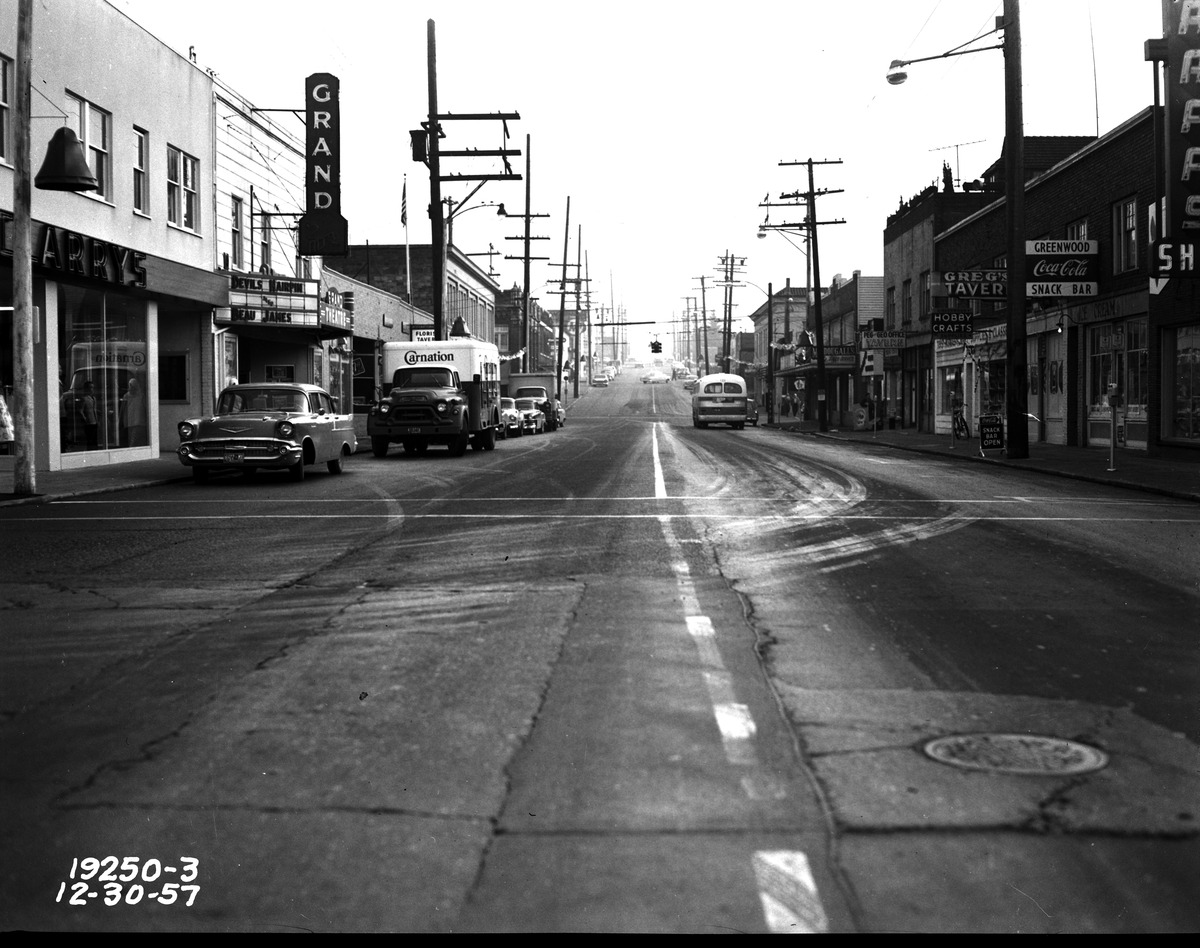
An image of the theater (left) that is now home to Taproot Theatre Company, 1957

Taproot Theatre Company is a professional, nonprofit theatre company in Seattle, Washington, with a multi-faceted production program. Founded in 1976 by six friends, five of them graduates from Seattle Pacific University, Taproot Theatre has mainstage productions at its location in the Greenwood neighborhood, touring productions throughout the Pacific Northwest, and theatrical training through its acting studio. Taproot Theatre Company is a member of Theatre Communications Group, Theatre Puget Sound, and the Phinney Neighborhood Association.

== Mainstage ==
Taproot Theatre produces five plays each year for its Mainstage season, plus an annual holiday production. Play selection includes classics, world premieres, musicals, dramas and comedies. Each Mainstage production offers one pay-what-you-can performance. The theatre company reaches approximately 30,000 audience members each year through more than 150 performances.

In addition to its regular performances, Taproot hosts matinees targeted to specific audience, either students or seniors. Each student matinee includes a post-show talk-back with the actors and director. For some students, it is the first time they have seen a professional production.

== Acting studio ==
Taproot’s Acting Studio was founded in 1992 to provide affordable, encouraging and artistically challenging classes for children and adults interested in learning the craft of acting. In the years since then, Taproot has expanded the program to offer year-round classes in dozens of subjects including musical theatre, on-camera acting, and Shakespeare.

== Touring ==
Taproot Theatre Company began as a touring company in 1976, performing throughout Washington State at schools, prisons, churches and community centers. Today, Taproot’s Road Company spends the school year using theatre to teach social-issue lessons such as bullying and harassment prevention to schools in Seattle and throughout the Pacific Northwest; this program began in 1985. Each summer, Taproot assembles a Road Company of five professional actors to present a three-play repertoire of social-issue plays to school populations. The cast engage with the students after each performance through interactive talk-back sessions and classrooms discussions. As of early 2008, over 1 million students have seen Taproot’s social-issue plays. Plays in this program are written by Northwest playwrights and incorporate principles from Committee for Children’s Steps to Respect and Second Step curricula. During the 2008/2009 school year, Taproot’s Road Company introduced a new play, New Girl by Josh Hornbeck, about cyber bullying.

TTC also mounts touring productions for the church and corporate communities. The company’s improv comedy troupe tours as well.

== Mainstage production history ==
2026: Till We Have Faces, Ain't Misbehavin', Barefoot in the Park, Joseph and the Amazing Technicolor Dreamcoat, Conscience

2025: A Raisin in the Sun, Always…Patsy Cline, Murder on the Links, The Importance of Being Earnest

2024: The Book of Will; How to Write a New Book for the Bible; Sherlock Holmes and the Precarious Position; Sister Act; My Lord, What a Night; Happy Christmas, Jeeves

2023: A Woman of No Importance, As It Is in Heaven, Jeeves Takes a Bow, The Hello Girls, Last Drive to Dodge

2022: See How They Run, The Spitfire Grill, The Nerd, Black Coffee, A Night with the Russells: The Legacy of Us, The Wickhams: Christmas at Pemberley

2021: Babette’s Feast, Daddy Long Legs (Digital Streaming Event)

2020: Steel Magnolias, Christmas at Home (Digital Streaming Event)

2019: Arsenic and Old Lace, We Will Not Be Silent, Kim's Convenience, Bright Star, Necessary Sacrifices, The Bishop's Wife: A Live Radio Play

2018: Camping with Henry and Tom, Crowns, Lady Windermere's Fan, Sweet Land, Baskerville: A Sherlock Holmes Mystery, Miss Bennet: Christmas at Pemberley

2017: Room Service, Evidence of Things Unseen, Busman’s Honeymoon, Persuasion, Relativity, A Civil War Christmas: An American Musical Celebration

2016: Silent Sky, Cotton Patch Gospel, The Realization of Emily Linder, Big Fish, Joyful Noise

2015: The Explorers Club, Best of Enemies, Jeeves Intervenes, Godspell, Dracula, This Christmas

2014: Mr. Pim Passes By, In the Book Of, Diana of Dobson’s, Jane Eyre, The Fabulous Lipitones, Appalachian Christmas Homecoming

2013: Jeeves in Bloom, The Whipping Man, Bach at Leipzig, Illyria, The Matchmaker, Le Club Noel

2012: Tartuffe, Freud’s Last Session, Leaving Iowa, Chaps!, Gaudy Night, Sherlock Holmes and the Case of the Christmas Carol

2011: Odyssey, The Beams are Creaking, Brownie Points, Something's Afoot, An Ideal Husband, Beasley's Christmas Party

2010: The Great Divorce, Brooklyn Boy, Charley's Aunt, Man of La Mancha, Wedding Belles, Sherlock Holmes and the Case of the Christmas Carol

2009: Gee’s Bend, Tuesdays with Morrie, Around the World in 80 Days, Smoke on the Mountain Homecoming, Enchanted April, It's a Wonderful Life: A Live Radio Play

2008: As You Like It, Doubt: A Parable, Over the River and Through the Woods, Big River: The Adventures of Huckleberry Finn, Susan and God, The Christmas Foundling

2007: The God Committee, Mary’s Wedding, Seven Keys to Baldpate, Joseph and the Amazing Technicolor Dreamcoat, The Importance of Being Earnest, The Farndale Avenue Housing Estate Townswomen's Guild Dramatic Society's Production of A Christmas Carol

2006: An Inspector Calls, The Voice of the Prairie, The Foreigner, Smoke on the Mountain, Arms and the Man, It’s A Wonderful Life: A Live Radio Play

2005: An Enemy of the People, Beau Jest, Arthur: The Hunt, The Fantasticks, The Last Train to Nibroc, The Trial of Ebenezer Scrooge.

2004: Arthur: The Begetting, Fools, Shadowlands, You’re a Good Man, Charlie Brown, Much Ado About Nothing, A Radioland Christmas

2003: All My Sons, The Last Night of Ballyhoo, God’s Man in Texas, The Spitfire Grill, Candida, The Carrolls of Queen Anne

2002: The Comedy of Errors, The Man Who Was Thursday, Sleuth, Wonderful Tennessee, Oil City Symphony, Appalachian Christmas Homecoming

2001: You Can't Take It with You, Heaven on Earth, Cotton Patch Gospel, Balmoral, Joyful Noise, Appalachian Christmas Homecoming

2000: Moreau, Harvey, Wait Until Dark, Mass Appeal, Radio Gals, Sanders Family Christmas

1999: Ah, Wilderness!, Terra Nova, The Trip to Bountiful, Bullshot Crummond, Quilters, Sanders Family Christmas

1998: Lost in Yonkers, The Clearing, Busman’s Honeymoon, The Boys Next Door, Godspell, Christmas on the Orpheum Circuit

1997: You Never Can Tell, Traveler in the Dark, Boomers, Driving Miss Daisy, St. Hugo of Central Park, Stages of Christmas

1996 First Season at Taproot’s new permanent facility in Seattle: Pre-Season show: An Evening Around the Radio JB, Black Coffee, The Foreigner, Edith Stein, Smoke on the Mountain

1995: The Rainmaker, Min Ma Mulano, Opal, Beau Jest, Pilgrim

1994: The Nerd, The Voice of the Prairie, The Curious Savage, Cotton Patch Gospel

1993: Talley's Folly, See How They Run, Saint Joan, Godspell

1992: Steel Magnolias, Both Your Houses, Becoming Memories, Smoke on the Mountain

1991: Fairview location: The Blind Date & The Midnight Caller, Angel's Fall, An Inspector Calls

1990: Fairview location: A Gentleman's Agreement, Marriage Wheel

1989: Red Letter Days, Summer staged readings: Promise, American Lebanon, A Gentleman's Agreement

1988: Catwalk, The Brass Butterfly, The Electric Angel

Mini Seasons at the newly created 70-seat studio theatre at St. Thomas Center: 1987: Fish Tales

1987- 1995 Dinner Theatre at Fairview: 1987 Second Shepherd's Play, 1988 Angel's Arms, 1989 The Chimes, 1990 Snowman, 1991 It's Christmas and It's Live, 1992 The Day Boy & The Night Girl, 1993 Angel's Arms, 1994 Gifts of the Magi, 1995 It's Christmas and It's Live

1983–1986 Dinner Theatre Years at St Thomas: 1983 Christmas in the Marketplace, 1984 The Clown of God, 1985 Christmas in the Marketplace, 1985 Abraham & Sarah, 1986 Christmas Cards

1982: Pilgrim, The Mousetrap, The Fourposter, A Man For All Seasons

1981: Arms and the Man, Easter, You Can't Take it With You, The Beams are Creaking

1980: Our Town, The Devil To Pay, Sentenced To Life

1979: Pilgrim
