= Gerard Canonico =

American actor and singer (born 1989)

- Born: July 23, 1989 (age 37); New Jersey, U.S.
- Occupations: Actor, singer
- Years active: 1999–present

Gerard Canonico (born July 23, 1989) is an American actor and singer, best known for his roles in Broadway and off-Broadway musicals, including Gavroche in Les Misérables and Rich Goranski in Be More Chill. He appeared in the films Not Fade Away (2012) and Stuck (2017).

== Biography ==
A native of New Jersey, Canonico has been performing since he was six years old. While first interested in modeling, he decided it was boring and his mother suggested acting instead. He has been a musician since he was 10 years old, starting with voice and moving on to drums and guitar. Both his parents are musicians and his father is a music teacher. A resident of Matawan, Canonico attended Mater Dei High School. In 2023, he married fellow actor and musician Devon Meddock.

== Career ==
Canonico's first Broadway performance was in 1999, playing Gavroche in the musical Les Misérables. He played the role for a year and a half before leaving to act in A Christmas Carol at Madison Square Garden in 2000 and 2001, playing the role of Jonathan. That same year, Canonico joined the national tour of Casper the Musical, performing alongside Chita Rivera in Pittsburgh, Kansas City, Atlanta, and Dallas. While he was still performing in Les Misérables he participated in readings for the off-Broadway musical The Prince and the Pauper at the Lamb's Theatre. In 2002, he played the Pauper Tom Canty at the show's opening and for several months until he was thought to have grown out of the role. Also in 2002, Canonico portrayed Louis in The King and I at the Paper Mill Playhouse.

In 2004, Canonico played Brett in the off-Broadway musical Children's Letters to God, also at the Lamb's Theatre.

Canonico performed as an ensemble member and as an understudy for all male roles (excluding Melchior Gabor) in the Broadway musical Spring Awakening, which opened on November 10, 2006, at the Eugene O'Neill Theatre. He took over the role of Moritz from August 4, 2008 until the show closed on January 18, 2009.

In the summer of 2009, Canonico was cast in American Idiot, a musical based on the hit Green Day album, along with fellow Spring Awakening cast members Brian Charles Johnson and John Gallagher, Jr. American Idiot premiered in Berkeley, California on September 4, 2009. Gerard stayed with the show until its April 24, 2011 closing as a member of the ensemble while also understudying two other featured ensemble tracks.

Canonico appeared as Goliath in the Off-Broadway production of Stand Tall, a musical based on the story of David and Goliath. This was presented as part of the New York Musical Theater Festival during the summer of 2012.

He appeared as the principal role of Matt in the rock musical Bare at the New World Stages in New York City. Previews began on November 19, 2012, and the show officially opened on December 9, 2012. It ran through February 3, 2013.

Canonico also appeared in a 15-minute musical called 21 Chump Street written by Lin-Manuel Miranda on June 7, 2014.

Canonico appeared in the world premiere of the Off-Broadway show Brooklynite (reuniting with Spring Awakening director Michael Mayer as well as former castmates Matt Doyle and Remy Zaken) at the Vineyard Theatre. The show ran from January 30 to March 22, 2015.

Canonico performed the role of Rich Goranski in the original cast of the world premiere of the musical Be More Chill. The show performed at the Two River Theater in Red Bank, New Jersey from May 30 to June 28, 2015.

Canonico portrayed Schindewulf in David Chase's film debut Not Fade Away which was released on December 21, 2012. He also appeared in Stuck as Caleb.

Canonico also was an understudy for the role of Evan Hansen in the musical Dear Evan Hansen, which ran at the Off-Broadway Second Stage Theater from May 1 until May 29, 2016.

Canonico returned to Broadway in the Tim Minchin musical adaptation Groundhog Day, based on the Bill Murray film. Previews began March 16, 2017, at the August Wilson Theatre, with the official opening on April 17, 2017.

Canonico reprised the role of Rich Goranski in Be More Chill, which premiered Off-Broadway at Signature Theatre Company in July 2018. The show ended its Off-Broadway run in September 2018 before transferring to the Lyceum Theatre for its Broadway premiere in February 2019. The show closed on August 11, 2019.

== Taking Chances/The Dude Ranch/Lion in The Mane/Parader ==
Canonico was a member of the band Taking Chances, as lead singer and playing guitar, in which he wrote the music and lyrics, since Christmas 2006, along with the Salerno brothers, Nick, Chris, and Joe. They are an alternative rock band from Hazlet, New Jersey. The music ranges from upbeat pop to rock, with ska, reggae, and light acoustic songs. Their influences include Green Day, Jimmy Eat World, the All American Rejects, Foo Fighters, and David Bowie They released a CD in April 2008, self-titled "Taking Chances".

He has played drums with Declan Bennett at various clubs around New York City and can also be heard on the CD "Record:Breakup". He is currently the lead guitar/vocals and occasionally the drummer for a Blink 182 Tribute Band called The Dude Ranch.

On October 31, 2020, Canonico played drums with New York City's "Lion in the Mane" at Takeover Live in Los Angeles, CA. It was then announced on November 3, 2020 that Gerard has officially joined the band. They began writing and recording for a mid-2021 release.

In August 2021, Lion in the Mane announced that it was changing its name to PARADER. A teaser for the debut PARADER track "Whiskey and Water" was posted the same day. "Whiskey and Water" was released on September 10, 2021, quickly becoming a Spotify Playlist favorite. PARADER then made their New York City debut on September 17, 2021, at the Mercury Lounge playing a mix of former Lion in The Mane hits and new PARADER songs.

== Theatre credits ==
| Year | Production | Role | Venue | Notes |
|---|---|---|---|---|
| 1999–2000 | Les Misérables | Gavroche | Imperial Theatre | Broadway |
| 2000–2001 | A Christmas Carol | Jonathan | Madison Square Garden | |
| 2001 | Casper the Musical | Bradley | Tour | National tour |
| 2002 | The King and I | Louis Leonowens | Paper Mill Playhouse | Regional |
| 2004 | Children's Letters to God | Brett | Lamb's Theatre | Off-Broadway |
| 2006–2008 | Spring Awakening | Ensemble / Male understudy (except Melchior Gabor) | Eugene O'Neill Theatre | Broadway |
| 2008–2009 | Spring Awakening | Moritz Stiefel | Eugene O'Neill Theatre | Broadway |
| 2009 | American Idiot | Ensemble / Featured ensemble understudy | Berkeley Repertory Theatre | Regional |
| 2010–2011 | American Idiot | Ensemble / Featured ensemble understudy | St. James Theatre | Broadway |
| 2012 | Stand Tall | Goliath | | New York Musical Festival |
| 2012–2013 | Bare | Matt | New World Stages | Off-Broadway |
| 2014 | 21 Chump Street | Ensemble | Brooklyn Academy of Music | |
| 2015 | Brooklynite | Kid Comet | Vineyard Theatre | Off-Broadway |
| 2015 | Be More Chill | Rich Goranski | Two River Theater | Regional |
| 2016 | Dear Evan Hansen | Evan Hansen understudy | Second Stage Theater | Off-Broadway |
| 2017 | Groundhog Day | Freddie | August Wilson Theatre | Broadway |
| 2018 | Be More Chill | Rich Goranski / Jeremy Heere understudy | Signature Theatre Company | Off-Broadway |
| 2019 | Be More Chill | Rich Goranski / Jeremy Heere understudy | Lyceum Theatre | Broadway |
| 2022-23 | Almost Famous | Dick Roswell | Bernard B. Jacobs Theatre | Broadway |
| 2022-23 | Almost Famous | Dick Roswell | Eugene O'Neill Theater Center | Workshop readings |

== Discography ==
- 2018 "Be More Chill" cast album
- 2017 "Groundhog Day" cast album
- 2015 "Be More Chill" cast album
- 2014 "21 Chump Street" cast album
- 2012 "Record: Breakup"
- 2010 "American Idiot" cast album
- 2008 "Taking Chances"
- 2007 "Spring Awakening" cast album
- 2004 "Children's Letters to God" cast album
- 2002 "The Prince and the Pauper" cast album
