= United Nations International School =

School in Manhattan, New York

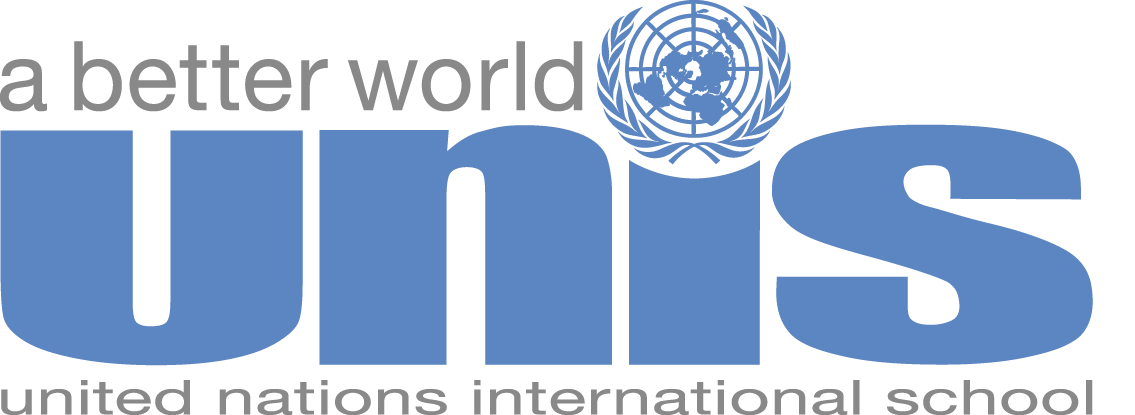

Location
- 24-50 FDR Drive; New York, New York 10010; United States

Information
- Type: Independent, International School, Private
- Established: 1947
- Director: Dan Brenner (Salary 750k a year)
- Faculty: 255
- Grades: PK–12
- Enrollment: c. 1,600
- Campus: Urban
- Colors: Light blue & white
- Mascot: Uniscorn
- Affiliation: United Nations
- Website: www.unis.org

The United Nations International School (UNIS) is a private international school in New York City which was established in 1947. Today, UNIS has over 1,600 students in one campus in Manhattan, close to the Headquarters of the United Nations. The Manhattan campus, overlooking the East River, is K-12; until 2022, the school also ran a K-8 school at a campus in Jamaica Estates, Queens.

UNIS was one of the pilot schools of the International Baccalaureate (IB) and was among those awarding the first IB diplomas. The K–12 curriculum prepares UNIS students for the IB, and the school's academic standards attempts to enable students to go on to study in top colleges/universities both in the United States and the rest of the world.

UNIS is a member of the Council of International Schools, the International Baccalaureate Organization, the European Council of International Schools, the New York State Association of Independent Schools, the National Association of Independent Schools and the College Board along with being registered to the New York Board of Regents as an independent, not-for-profit school.

== Background ==
Many members of the United Nations staff arriving with young families found unexpected difficulties with the school system in New York. Among them was K. T. Behanan and his wife, who arrived from India in May 1947 with their five-year-old son to help the UN's Trusteeship Council with educational policy. The Behanans banded together with other UN families who were in a similar situation to establish the United Nations International School at Lake Success, with Dr. Behanan as chairman of its board. The school was founded to provide an international education for students, while preserving its students' diverse cultural heritages.

== Curriculum ==
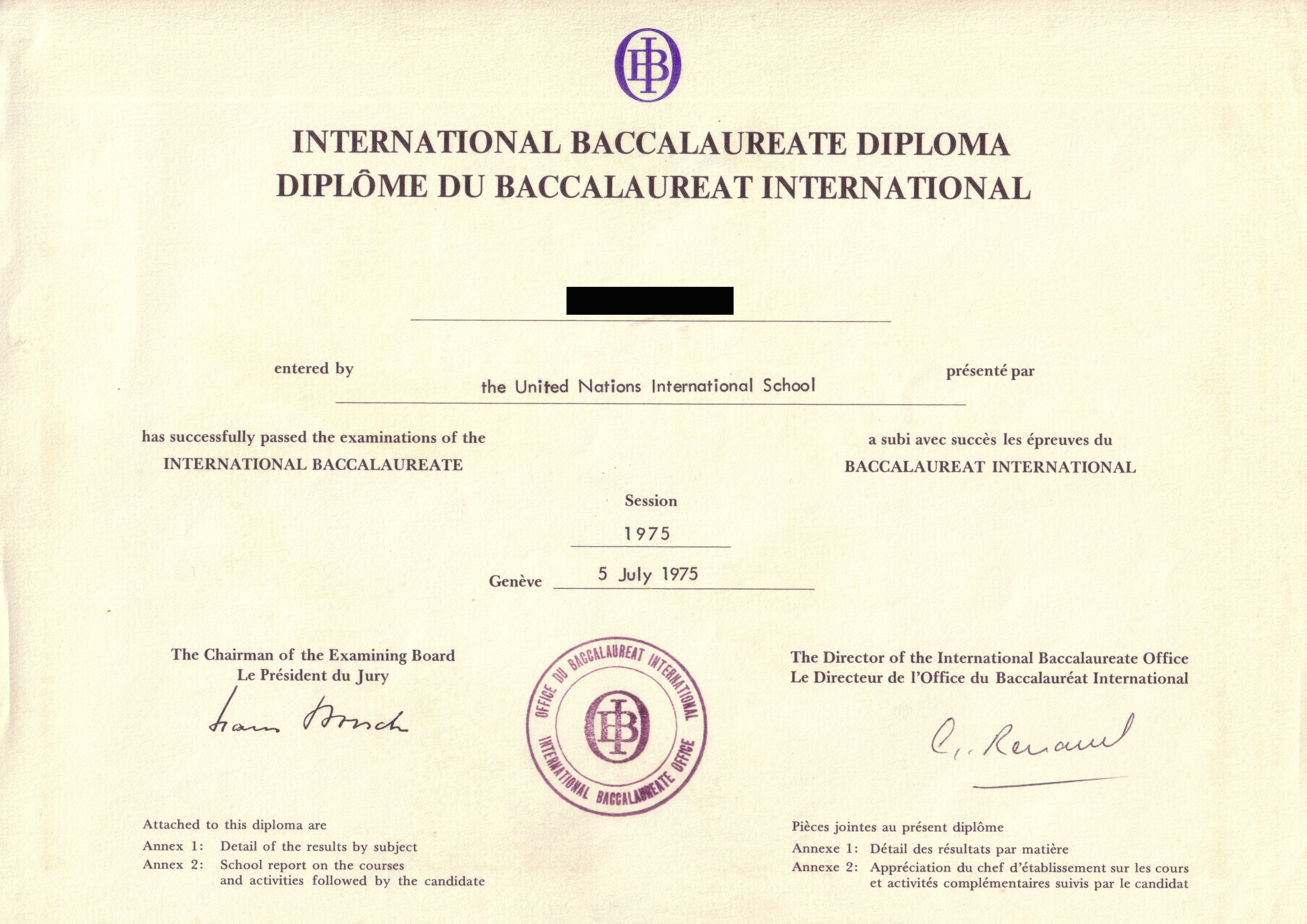
International Baccalaureate Diploma issued by the UNIS in 1975

In the formative years, UNIS offered a school-designed curriculum, from Kindergarten (JA, in UNIS) to the 12th Grade (T4), in which elementary school (junior school, in UNIS), middle school and high school (tut house) students enroll for the International Baccalaureate Diploma (IBDP) or IB Courses. Within the framework of IB requirements, students have the possibility to choose from over two-hundred course combinations.

Students are taught in relatively small classes, with averages of 17 children in Kindergarten, 17 in the 1st Grade (J1), 17 in the 2nd Grade (J2), 19 in Grades 3–4 (J3-J4) and 21 throughout middle and high school (M1-T4). Emphasis is placed on preparation for the IB exams during high school, for which virtually all seniors sit (full Diploma or Certificate). Children whose parents transfer from abroad to work for the United Nations, Missions to the United Nations, and Consulates have priority in terms of admission, but admission is not automatic. All children are required to be interviewed and assessed in-person at UNIS, in addition to consideration of official school reports, if any.

The main language used in the school is English, and all students study either French or Spanish from Kindergarten to the 12th Grade. Students are required to pursue a third language from the 7th Grade to the 12th Grade (Arabic, French, Chinese, German, Italian, Japanese, or Spanish). Additional languages can be studied by students within and external to the school during the weekend or after school during the school week. The school's current executive director is Dr. Dan Brenner.

The AEFE categorizes this school as a French international school.

== University and college attendance ==
Nearly all UNIS graduates matriculate at four-year colleges in the semester following graduation, with a small number choosing a gap-year program. A typical year will see 75% to 85% of graduates enrolling at colleges in the United States, with remaining graduates attending 20 different universities in thirteen countries outside the U.S.

Top Colleges Attended 2011-2015
New York University
McGill University
George Washington University
Boston University
Cornell University
Barnard College
Northeastern University
Vassar College
University of Chicago
Fordham University

== Events and programs ==
UNIS offers events and programming related to its unique connection to the United Nations.

Each year, a committee of high school students organizes a conference in the General Assembly Hall of the United Nations with guest speakers. Other schools are also invited to this conference. This activity allows students to engage with real world issues.

The UNIS Model United Nations Club hosts an annual Model United Nations conference.

The school celebrates an annual UN Day, a celebration of the school's connection to the United Nations and its principles, highlighting the cultures, traditions, and experiences of countries around the world.

== Campus history ==
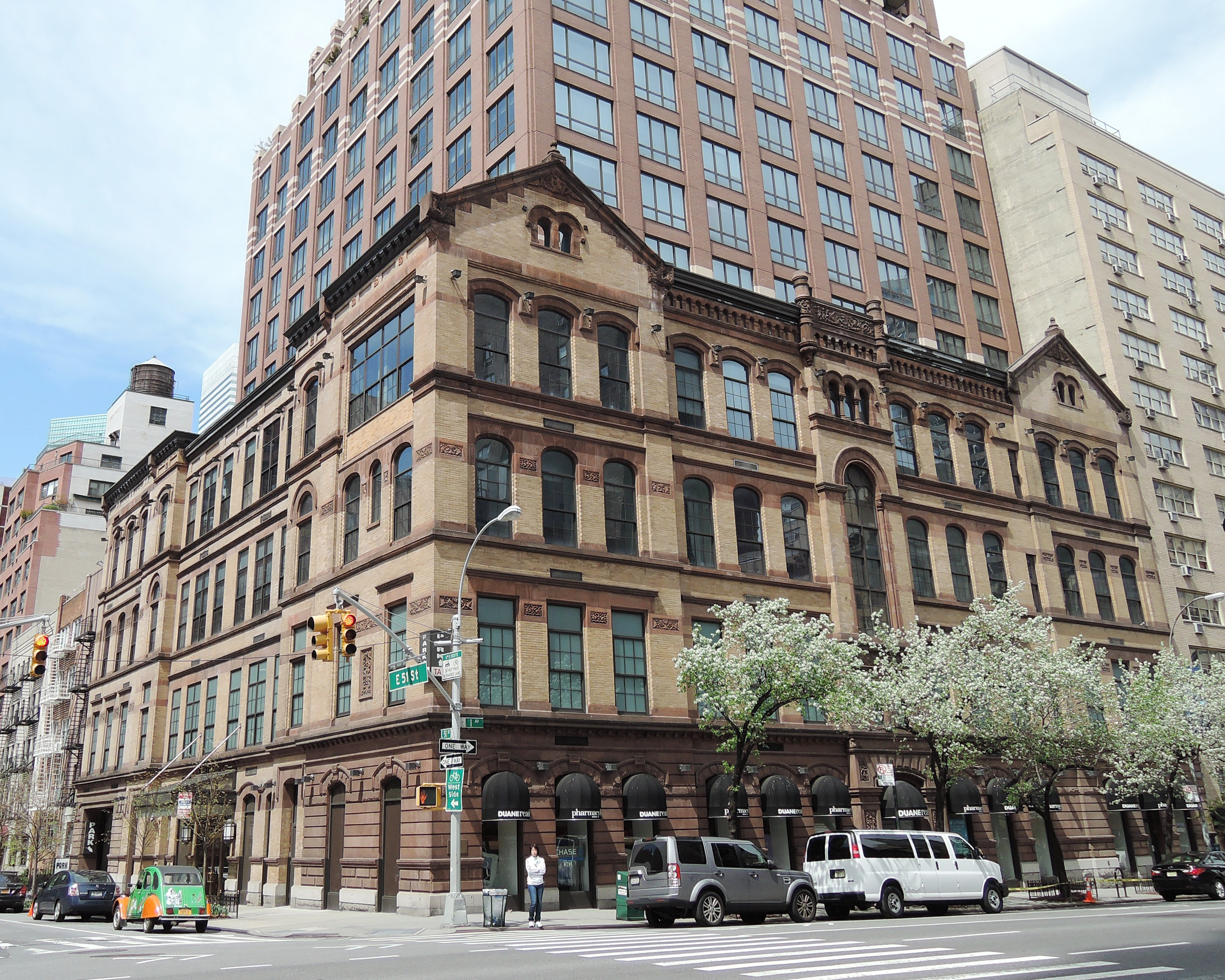
Former site of UNIS at P.S. 135

UNIS was founded in 1947. It was previously located in a former school building at 1311 First Avenue, on East 70th Street, in Lenox Hill, Manhattan. In 1964, the Ford Foundation offered a conditional donation of $7 million for a new school building at the headquarters of the United Nations, near an existing playground; Sweden and Libya also contributed funds. UNIS had acquired a site at York Avenue and 89th Street in Yorkville, but sold it in 1965. Two years later, another alternate site south of the UN headquarters was proposed for UNIS. Under the headship of the Irishman Desmond Cole, UNIS moved around 1970 into two premises on 51st (the Junior School headed by Lea Rangel-Ribeiro) and the middle school 54th streets. The site on 51st Street previously housed Public School 135; the site at 418 East 54th Street previously had been used as showrooms and office space for furniture companies. The high school was housed on East 11th Street.

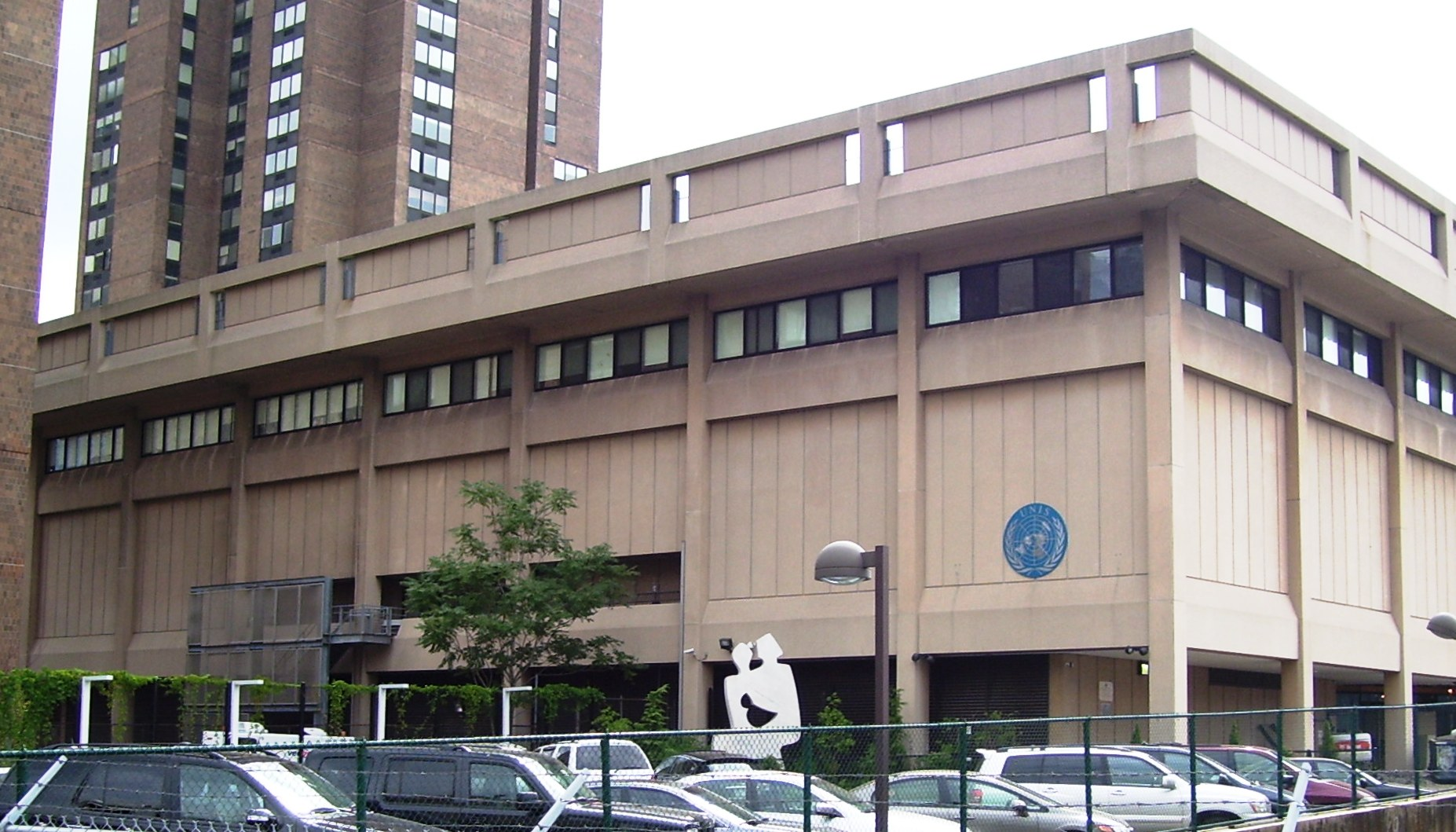
UNIS Manhattan Campus, with Waterside Plaza in the background

The main building on 25th Street opened in January 1973, marking the first permanent location for UNIS in its history. It was designed by the architecture firm of Harrison & Abramovitz. The building was constructed on a platform that had been previously built for the planned school with a $1-million grant from the Rockefeller Brothers Fund. The city had first proposed that the school be constructed on a platform at the site in August 1965. The location was formally occupied by Pier 73, to which was docked the SS John W. Brown, a former Liberty ship that was being used as an annex for the Food and Maritimes Vocational High School. To make way for construction of the platform, the ship was moved in January 1966 to Pier 42 on the Hudson River. On May 5, 1969, the deck of the future school site was used as the landing field for a Hawker Siddeley Harrier vertical take-off and landing jet operated by the Royal Air Force in the Daily Mail Trans-Atlantic Air Race.

=== Salaries and compensation ===
Compensation constitutes the largest component of expenditures at the United Nations International School (UNIS), reflecting the central role of personnel in delivering its academic programs. According to recent IRS Form 990 filings, as compiled by ProPublica Nonprofit Explorer, the school reported total expenses of approximately $72.5 million, of which about $53.9 million was allocated to salaries and employee benefits. This indicates that well over two-thirds of the school’s operating budget is devoted to compensation, a proportion consistent with other large nonprofit educational institutions.

UNIS employs several hundred staff across instructional, administrative, and support roles. While individual salaries for most employees—particularly classroom teachers—are not publicly itemized in Form 990 filings, the aggregate payroll figure suggests a wide distribution of compensation levels. These range from support staff to senior administrators, reflecting the scale and complexity of operating an international school offering multilingual instruction and extensive academic programming.

Form 990 disclosures provide detailed information on compensation for the institution’s highest-paid employees. In the most recent reporting period, the Executive Director received total compensation of approximately $757,758, including salary and benefits, making this the highest reported individual compensation at the school. Other senior administrators were compensated at lower but still substantial levels. The Chief Financial Officer earned roughly $352,747 in total compensation, while divisional principals overseeing the high school, middle school, and junior school each received between approximately $280,000 and $300,000. Additional senior staff, including directors of academic programs and student services, typically earned between about $190,000 and $260,000.

These compensation levels reflect both the size of the institution and the complexity of its operations. As an international school serving a diverse student body, UNIS requires leadership with expertise in global education standards, administration, and finance. Compensation for top administrators is therefore broadly comparable to that at other large private and international schools, where salaries often scale with institutional budget and enrollment.

At the governance level, UNIS follows standard nonprofit practices: members of its board of trustees receive no compensation for their service. This distinction reflects the separation between paid executive management and unpaid oversight typical of tax-exempt organizations in the United States.

Over time, spending on salaries and benefits has grown alongside overall revenues and institutional expansion. Rising enrollment, increased program offerings, and competitive labor markets—particularly in New York City—have contributed to upward pressure on compensation. As a result, payroll has remained the dominant expenditure category, underscoring the labor-intensive nature of private education.

== Notable alumni ==
- Ishmael Beah, writer
- Byrdie Bell, actress
- Yasmine Bleeth, actress
- Kate Burton, actress
- Suleiman Braimoh (born 1989), Nigerian-American basketball player
- Andrea Brand, biologist
- Dorothy Bush, daughter of George H. W. Bush
- Pauline Chalamet, actress and producer.
- Vikram Chatwal, socialite and business tycoon Sant Singh Chatwal
- Gary Cohen, TV sports broadcaster
- Radhika Coomaraswamy, lawyer and former United Nations Under-Secretary-General
- Stéphane Dujarric de la Rivière, United Nations spokesperson
- Mohamed A. El-Erian, former CEO of PIMCO
- Will Gluck, writer-director
- Mike Greenberg, sports radio host
- Nicholas Guest, actor
- Stephen Hartke, composer
- Sarah Jones, actress
- Morley (aka Morley Kamen), singer-songwriter
- Sarah Kay, poet
- Rashid Khalidi, Columbia University professor
- Richard Lachmann, sociologist and specialist in comparative historical sociology, professor at University at Albany, SUNY.
- Mia Mottley, Prime Minister of Barbados
- Joakim Noah, basketball player
- Atsushi Ogata, film maker
- Leila Pahlavi, princess of Iran
- Amanda Plummer, actress
- Elettra Rossellini Wiedemann, food editor and writer, fashion model, and socialite.
- Devon Scott, actress
- Sitapha Savané, Senegalese retired professional basketball player; member of the Senegal national basketball team.
- Andrea Sella, chemist, broadcaster and UCL professor.
- Qubilah Shabazz, daughter of Malcolm X
- Mina Sundwall, actress
- S. K. Thoth, performance artist
- Vasili Tsereteli, Russian artist, executive director of the Moscow Museum of Modern Art.
- Marius Vassiliou, scientist.
- John Zorn, musician
