= Lambs Club Building =

Hotel in Manhattan, New York

- Lamb's Club
- U.S. National Register of Historic Places
- New York State Register of Historic Places
- New York City Landmark
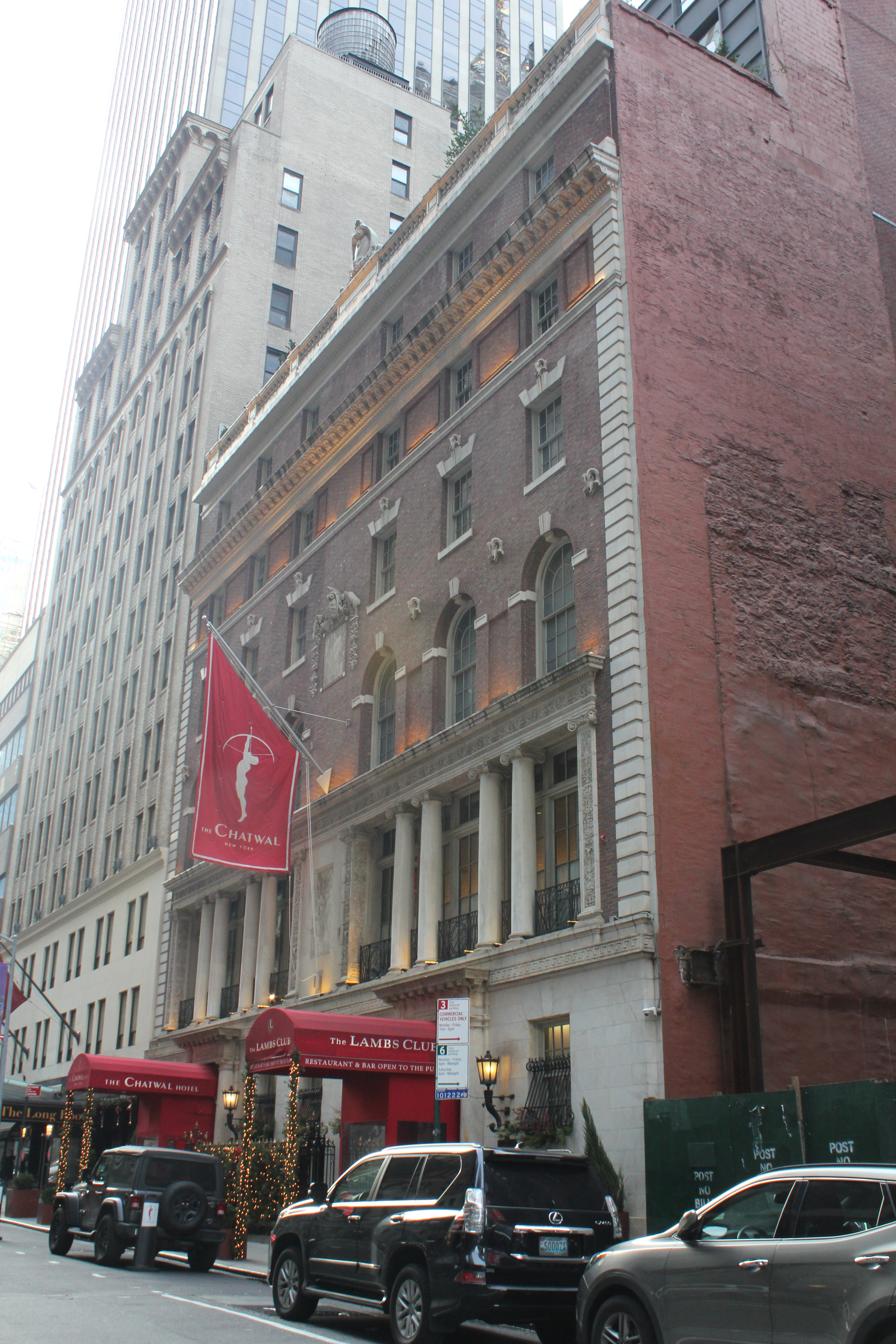
- Viewed from the west

- Location within Manhattan Location within New York City Location within New York Location within the United States
- Interactive map of Lamb's Club
- Location: 128–132 West 44th Street, Manhattan, New York
- Coordinates: 40°45′23″N 73°59′05″W
- Area: less than one acre
- Built: 1904–1905
- Architect: Stanford White, George Freeman
- Architectural style: Classical Revival
- NRHP reference No.: 82003382
- NYSRHP No.: 06101.001426
- NYCL No.: 0859

Significant dates
- Added to NRHP: June 3, 1982
- Designated NYSRHP: April 9, 1982
- Designated NYCL: September 24, 1974

The Lambs Club Building is a hotel and a former clubhouse at 130 West 44th Street, near Times Square, in the Midtown Manhattan neighborhood of New York City, New York, U.S. The building was originally six stories high and was developed in two phases as the headquarters of the Lambs, a theatrical social club. The original wing at 128–130 West 44th Street was designed by Stanford White of McKim, Mead & White between 1904 and 1905; the annex at 132 West 44th Street was designed in 1915 by George Freeman. The current design dates to a renovation between 2007 and 2010, designed by Thierry Despont. The building is a New York City designated landmark and is listed on the National Register of Historic Places.

The Lambs Club Building is variously cited as being designed in the Colonial, Neo-Georgian, or neoclassical styles. The ground floor of the facade is clad with smooth marble, while the upper stories are clad with red Flemish-bond brick, terracotta trim, and stone quoins at each end. The clubhouse's interior was originally designed in the Federal style, with club rooms on the lower stories and bedrooms for club members on the upper stories. The club rooms included auditoriums on the first and third floors; a dining room on the second floor; and a library and banquet room on the third floor. When the building was converted into a hotel, the first and second floors were converted into a bar and restaurant called the Lambs Club, while the upper floors were converted into 83 guestrooms.

The Lambs were founded in 1874 and relocated to multiple buildings over the years. By 1902, overcrowding at the club's previous headquarters prompted the Lambs to consider developing a new clubhouse, which opened on September 1, 1905. The clubhouse was expanded in 1915, but the Lambs faced financial troubles during the 1920s and 1930s because of competition from talking pictures. After the club experienced further financial difficulties in the 1970s, the clubhouse was sold at auction in 1975, and the Church of the Nazarene bought the clubhouse. The church used the building as a mission, while the theaters were leased to an off-Broadway venue called the Lamb's Theatre. The church announced plans to convert the building into a hotel in 1999 and sold the building in 2006 to Hampshire Hotels, operated by the family of Vikram Chatwal. The building was converted into the Chatwal New York hotel, which along with the Lambs Club restaurant opened in 2010l the hotel became part of Starwood's Luxury Collection. Since 2025, it has been owned by Ben-Josef Group, which announced plans to reopen it as the Wolseley Hotel in 2027..

== Site ==
The building is on 128–132 West 44th Street, on the south sidewalk between Seventh Avenue and Sixth Avenue, near Times Square in the Theater District of Midtown Manhattan in New York City, New York, U.S. The rectangular land lot covers 7,656 ft^{2} (711.3 m^{2}), with a frontage of 76 ft (23 m) on 44th Street and a depth of 100.42 ft (31 m). On the same block, the Town Hall is to the south, and 1500 Broadway is to the west. Other nearby buildings include 1530 Broadway to the northwest; Millennium Times Square New York, the Hudson Theatre, and the Hotel Gerard to the north; the Belasco Theatre to the northeast; and 4 Times Square and the Bank of America Tower to the south.

The building occupies its entire site of 76 by 100 ft (23 by 30 m). When it was built in the 1900s, the structure measured 37.5 ft (11.4 m) wide, but this was doubled in 1915. The Lambs Club Building was one of several clubhouses developed in the surrounding area during the early 20th century. The section of 44th Street just east of the Lambs Club Building is known as Club Row; when the building was developed, the Harvard Club, Yale Club, New York Yacht Club, New York City Bar Association, and Century Association all had clubhouses in the area.

== Architecture ==
The Lambs Club Building, designed for the Lambs social club, is cited as being designed in the Colonial, Neo-Georgian, or neoclassical styles. The building was originally six stories tall, with two basements, although the rear of the site only rose four stories. The original clubhouse, built between 1904 and 1905, occupies the eastern half of the lot and was designed by Stanford White of the architectural firm McKim, Mead & White. The building was one of several clubhouses that White designed for his firm. The western half of the building was designed in 1915 by George A. Freeman in an identical style to the original building. The modern-day design dates to a 2000s renovation by Thierry Despont.

=== Facade ===
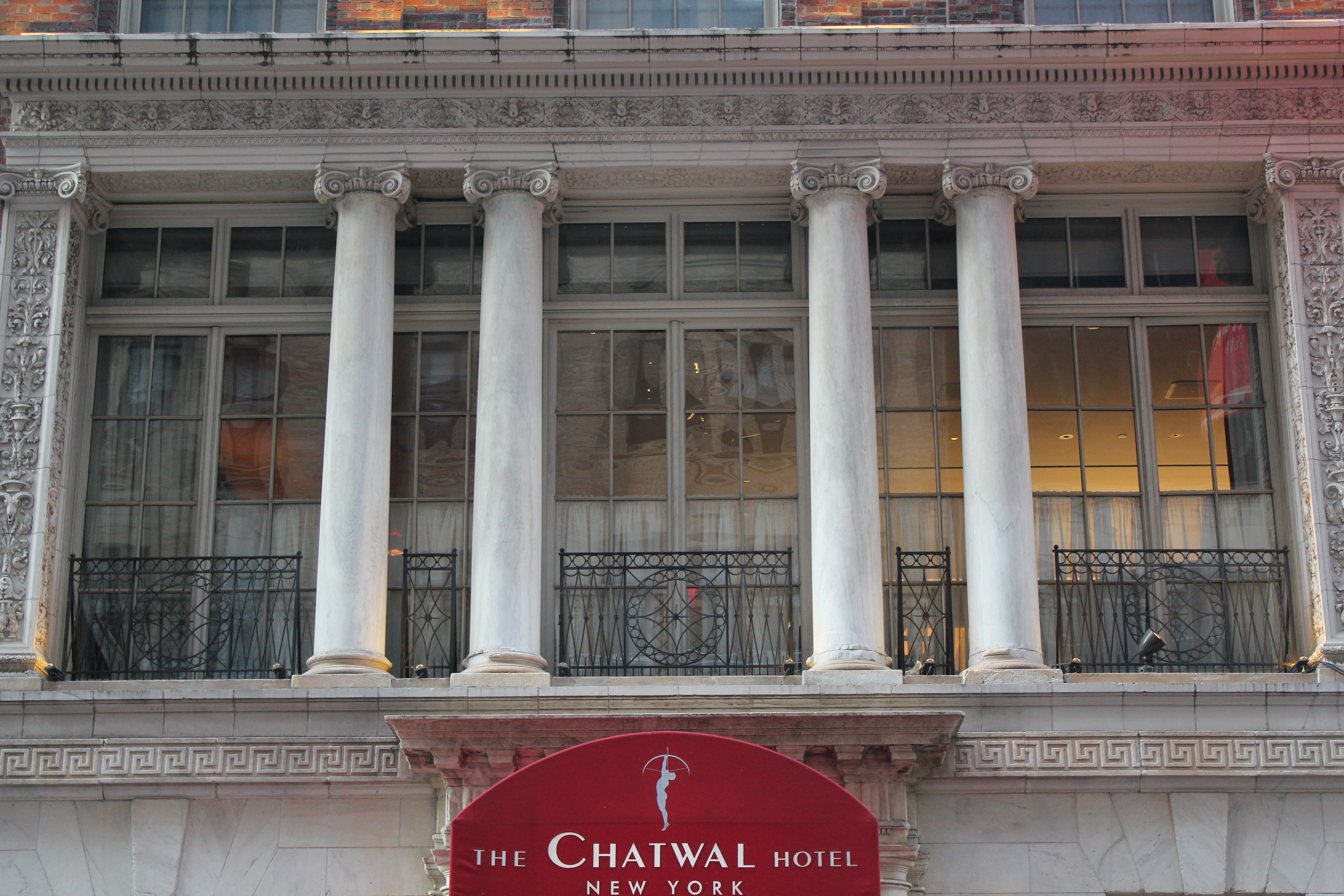
Second-floor loggia

White, a member of the Lambs, had intentionally designed the facade with both Federal-style and neo-Georgian details, as he was knowledgeable of what his grandson Samuel G. White called "the acting profession's reputation for social eccentricity". The northern elevation of the facade is the only one that is normally visible from street level. The ground floor is clad with smooth marble, while the upper stories are clad with red Flemish-bond brick. The walls contain terracotta trim, with stone quoins at each end. The facade is divided vertically into six bays; the eastern three bays form the original clubhouse, while the western three bays comprise the annex.

On the ground level, there are two entrances. Both of the entrances are flanked by engaged columns in the Doric order, which support a entablature. A band course with a meander motif stretches horizontally above the first floor. When the building was developed, there was a cast-iron fence at street level, but this had been removed by the 1980s. The second floor originally contained two groups of French windows, recessed within a loggia and flanked by a set of pilasters. Each bay is separated by columns, and there is a wrought iron balcony and a large rectangular window behind the columns. There is a plaque at the center of the second-story facade. An entablature, containing a frieze with foliate designs, runs above the entirety of the second floor.

There are brick round arches on the third story. Double-hung windows are recessed behind the archways. The arches are topped by terracotta keystones, and the sides of each arch contain impost blocks. The spandrels diagonally above each arch contain depictions of lambs' heads. Between the third and fourth stories is a large terracotta plaque, atop which is a cartouche with lambs on either side. The fourth story contains flat-arched terracotta lintels, and the keystones of each flat arch are topped by lambs' heads. There is a string course above the fourth story, as well as six plainly designed windows on the fifth story. Above the fifth story is a projecting cornice with modillions. The sixth floor is designed as a classical-style attic, above which is a balustrade.

=== Features ===
==== Original clubhouse ====
The clubhouse's interior was designed in the Federal style and contained a variety of theatrical memorabilia. The basement contained a barber shop. The first floor originally contained a lobby, a grill room, and a billiards room. The building's bar, designed by White, was decorated with red walls; Cosmopolitan magazine wrote in 1958 that the spaces "have the warm and friendly look of an Elizabethan tavern". According to a 1974 Variety article, comedian Joe Laurie Jr. had bequeathed $1,000 in his will to pay for indigent members' drinks; although Laurie's bequest had been exhausted by then, the club's bartenders continued to cover the cost of a member's drink if he could not afford it. The annex contained a theater on its ground floor, which contained 140 seats when it closed in 2006.

The second floor had a banquet room, which could accommodate at least 140 diners simultaneously. The banquet room's walls were decorated with portraits of the Lambs' leaders, who were known as "shepherds". On the same level was a library, which was reportedly a popular place for composing music because very few club members ever used that room. The second-story rooms were illuminated by the French windows and contained details such as a fireplace mantel with denticulation; pilasters in the Ionic order; and paneled ceiling beams. An alcove on the second floor was rededicated in 1947 as a memorial to Lambs members who had died during World Wars I and II.

The third floor included a library and a main assembly room. The third and fourth stories also contained the Edwin Burke Memorial Theatre. This theater was variously cited as containing 330, 360, 400, or 500 seats, and it had a loge and a stage with ornate paneling. Bedrooms for members, as well as club offices, were provided on the upper floors of the original building; the annex also contained bedrooms and a handball court on its upper stories. There were either 50, 55, or 65 bedrooms for members. According to Cosmopolitan, the rooms were "always filled" with long-term residents, actors who were starring in Broadway plays, and actors experiencing financial instability.

==== Hotel ====
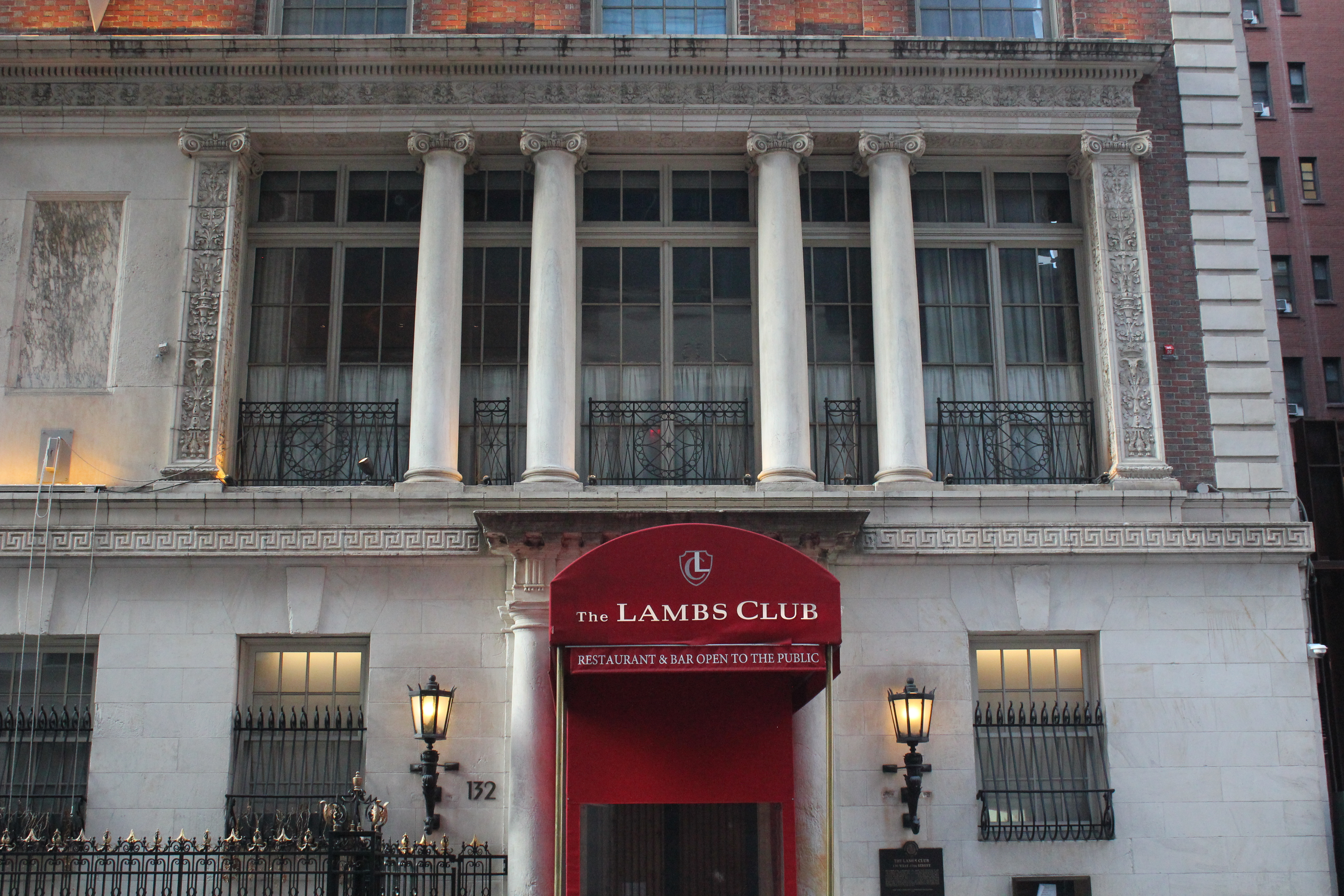
Entrance to the Lambs Club restaurant

The building was converted into the Chatwal New York hotel in the 2000s and was expanded to ten stories. The hotel had 83 guestrooms when it opened; by the 2020s, the hotel had 76 units. As part of the hotel conversion, the interior was redesigned in a modern Art Deco style. The auditorium on the third and fourth stories was demolished because it was badly deteriorated, but other components of the old clubhouse were preserved, such as the second-floor memorial alcove and some of the decorative details. There is a cocktail bar in the modern-day hotel's lobby. The first and second stories contain a two-level restaurant called the Lambs Club, which is owned separately from the hotel. The restaurant space retains many of the original design elements, such as a large fireplace, red banquettes, and portraits of the Lambs' shepherds; it also has modern design elements, including red benches that are patterned after Broadway theaters' seats. There is a 60-seat bar on its second floor, covering 2,500 ft^{2} (230 m^{2}).

The corridors leading to the guestrooms on the upper stories were redecorated in red, blue, or brown when the building was converted into a hotel. The guestrooms generally contain travel-themed decorations, inspired by suitcase and luggage manufacturer Malletier. The rooms contain suede walls and leather-paneled closets; each unit also had a stereo system, flat-screen TVs, and DVD players. Some of the rooms have private terraces that overlook the street. In addition, each room has a large writing desk, wardrobe, and nightstand. The guest bathrooms have marble paneling and heated toilet seats, as well as illuminated mirrors that double as televisions. The penthouse unit, named for the Barrymore family, comprises two suites, one of which has a spiral staircase leading to a roof terrace that overlooks the Belasco Theatre.

The rooms have 24-hour butler service, and each floor is served by its own butler. The hotel also has a "pet wardrobe supervisor" who creates wardrobes for guests' pets, in addition to a babysitting service. The hotel's other amenities include two plunge pools, a saltwater lap pool, a Jacuzzi, and a spa with three treatment rooms, There is a small fitness center next to the spa. The hotel has two meeting spaces: a 1,500 ft^{2} (140 m^{2}) meeting room called the Stage Room, which could accommodate 120 people, and a 600 ft^{2} (56 m^{2}) meeting suite called the Stanford White Studio, which could fit 40 people. The meeting rooms contain wooden finishes, as well as elliptical wine cellars that complement the doors in each room.

== History ==
The building was developed for the Lambs, a theatrical club founded in 1874 and officially incorporated in 1877. The Lambs' first shepherd, Henry James Montague, named the club after a group founded in London; the London club was named in honor of essayist Charles Lamb, who had frequently invited actors to his home. The Lambs relocated its headquarters, or "Fold", multiple times in the late 19th century, renting space at several buildings around Union Square, Manhattan. The Lambs became known for their theatrical revues, known as "gambols", starting in 1888. The Lambs began using these gambols to raise money for a new clubhouse in the late 1890s. Although the club had moved to 70 West 36th Street in 1897, the Lambs soon outgrew this location. During a weeklong gambol at eight cities in 1898, the Lambs raised over $60,000 for the construction of a new clubhouse.

=== Lambs Club ===
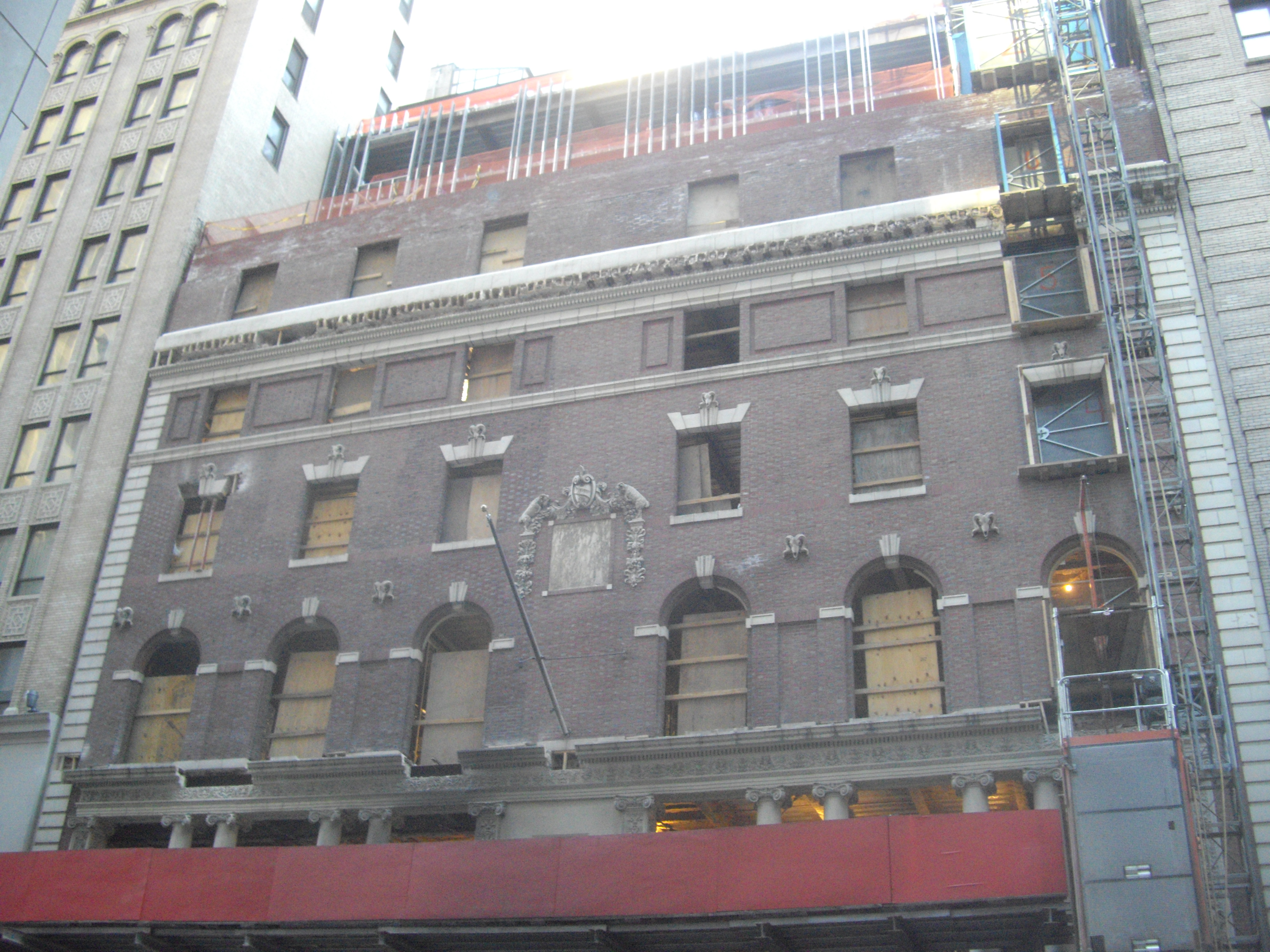
The Lambs Club Building facade as viewed from across 44th Street

==== Development and early years ====
The club's "shepherd", or president, DeWolf Hopper announced in March 1902 that the club had decided to build its own clubhouse with a dedicated theater for gambols. The Lambs had performed their gambols at the Garrick Theatre, but they had just been evicted following a disagreement with Charles Frohman. Club members had already subscribed $160,000 for the construction of a new clubhouse, and Hopper had received an offer of $62,500 for the 36th Street clubhouse. Maurice Campbell offered to lease the new theater. The club agreed to acquire a site at 128–130 West 44th Street in June 1902, although Minnie Lespinasse, the previous owner of the two plots, was expected to remain at that site for a year. The Lambs took title to the site in April 1903 and hired White the same year to design the building. Plans for the new clubhouse were filed with the Manhattan Bureau of Buildings on March 1, 1904, at which point the structure was to cost $100,000. That month, True and McKeefrey received the general contract for the building's construction. The Lambs laid the cornerstone for the clubhouse at a ceremony on August 24, 1904, and they sold their old building in early 1905.

The Lambs moved into the building on September 1, 1905, and the club held its first gambol in the 44th Street building that November. The Sun reported that the Lambs' clubhouse signified the relocation of Manhattan's "Theatrical Rialto". The auditorium hosted private gambols for club members each month; the best of these gambols were then publicly presented once a year. In keeping with club rules, the clubhouse never closed at night. Except for maids and housekeepers, women were not allowed to access the upper floors or become Lambs members. Nonetheless, some women did reportedly visit the clubhouse, including Ethel Barrymore and Luisa Tetrazzini. Theatrical figures such as Bobby Clark, John Drew Jr., Edgar Selwyn, and Douglas Fairbanks stayed in the clubhouse's bedrooms.

The Hartford Courant reported in June 1909 that the Lambs acquired a site from the Medcef Eden Realty Company at 120–126 West 44th Street, (Note: However, a subsequent report from The New York Times states that Charles Kaufmann and Edward Cuthbertson bought the properties at 120–126 West 44th Street.) with plans to develop an 18-story clubhouse there. Two months later, the club formed a committee to develop a new clubhouse; the committee considered leasing the Berkeley Lyceum at 21–25 West 44th Street. The club decided in December 1909 to lease a three-story dwelling at 126 West 44th Street. By 1911, the club had hired Freeman and Hasselman to design a 12-story structure at 134–138 West 44th Street, with a miniature theater. The club had 1,400 members by 1914, prompting the Lambs to host gambols to raise money for the addition. The club finally announced in February 1915 that it would build a six-story annex at 132–134 West 44th Street for $250,000, having obtained a $300,000 first mortgage loan from the Dime Savings Bank of New York. The architects filed plans with the Manhattan Bureau of Buildings in April 1915, and work on the annex proceeded during World War I. That June, the Lambs received permission to mortgage their clubhouse for $450,000; in addition to the first mortgage, the club raised $150,000 through a bond issue. The annex's cornerstone was laid on September 16, 1915, and the annex was completed in time for the Lambs' gambols in 1916.

==== Mid-20th century ====
The club received a $200,000 mortgage loan in 1922, and this mortgage was paid off by 1925. The club continued to grow, prompting its members to consider developing yet another clubhouse in March 1927 at a cost of $1.4 million or $1.5 million. The club considered relocating to Upper Manhattan and selling its 44th Street building, which was appraised at up to $1 million. At the time, the club had 1,700 members, many of whom approved of the proposed relocation; furthermore, real-estate prices near Times Square were increasing. The club wanted to build a standalone theater next to its proposed clubhouse, since, at the time, city building codes prohibited clubhouses from containing theaters with more than 300 seats. The Lambs canceled their plans for the new clubhouse in February 1928 after a committee deemed the project "inadvisable", citing the fact that the planned clubhouse would be unprofitable. During the late 1920s, the Lambs faced financial troubles because of competition from talking pictures. Some members could not afford to pay dues because they were unemployed, while others had been cast in film roles and had gone to Hollywood.

The club took out two mortgage loans on the clubhouse in 1930. The club received a five-year, $315,000 mortgage loan in March 1930 from the American Museum of Natural History. That June, the New York Supreme Court approved a $100,000 second mortgage on the clubhouse. By 1931, the clubhouse was valued at $800,000; this amount represented 80 percent of the Lambs' total assets. When the Lambs began adapting their private gambols for film in 1932, actresses were invited to the third-floor auditorium for the first time ever. Women were still banned from other events at the clubhouse, including art exhibits. During World War II, the clubhouse hosted weekly dinners for members of the United States Armed Forces. The club unveiled a memorial alcove at the clubhouse in 1947, dedicated to club members who had died in the two world wars.

The Lambs had 1,300 members in the late 1950s. Cosmopolitan magazine described the Lambs' "stately brick clubhouse" as a "hallowed stronghold of Broadway actors and song-and-dance men of the old school". The club's members included Alan Jay Lerner and Frederick Loewe of songwriting team Lerner and Loewe, who reportedly composed the musical Brigadoon in the third-floor theater. The club began allowing women to eat dinner in the dining room in 1956, although women were still prohibited from becoming members or from entering the building alone. The clubhouse hosted private performances of plays during this time, and it also hosted events in honor of various theatrical figures. Concurrently, the club's membership declined in the 20th century, in part because of younger generations' indifference toward joining clubs, as well as increasing crime rates near Times Square. By the 1970s, the Lambs' membership largely consisted of men who were at least 50 years old. The Tremont Savings and Loan Association placed a $360,000 first mortgage loan on the Lambs Club Building in July 1972.

==== Foreclosure ====
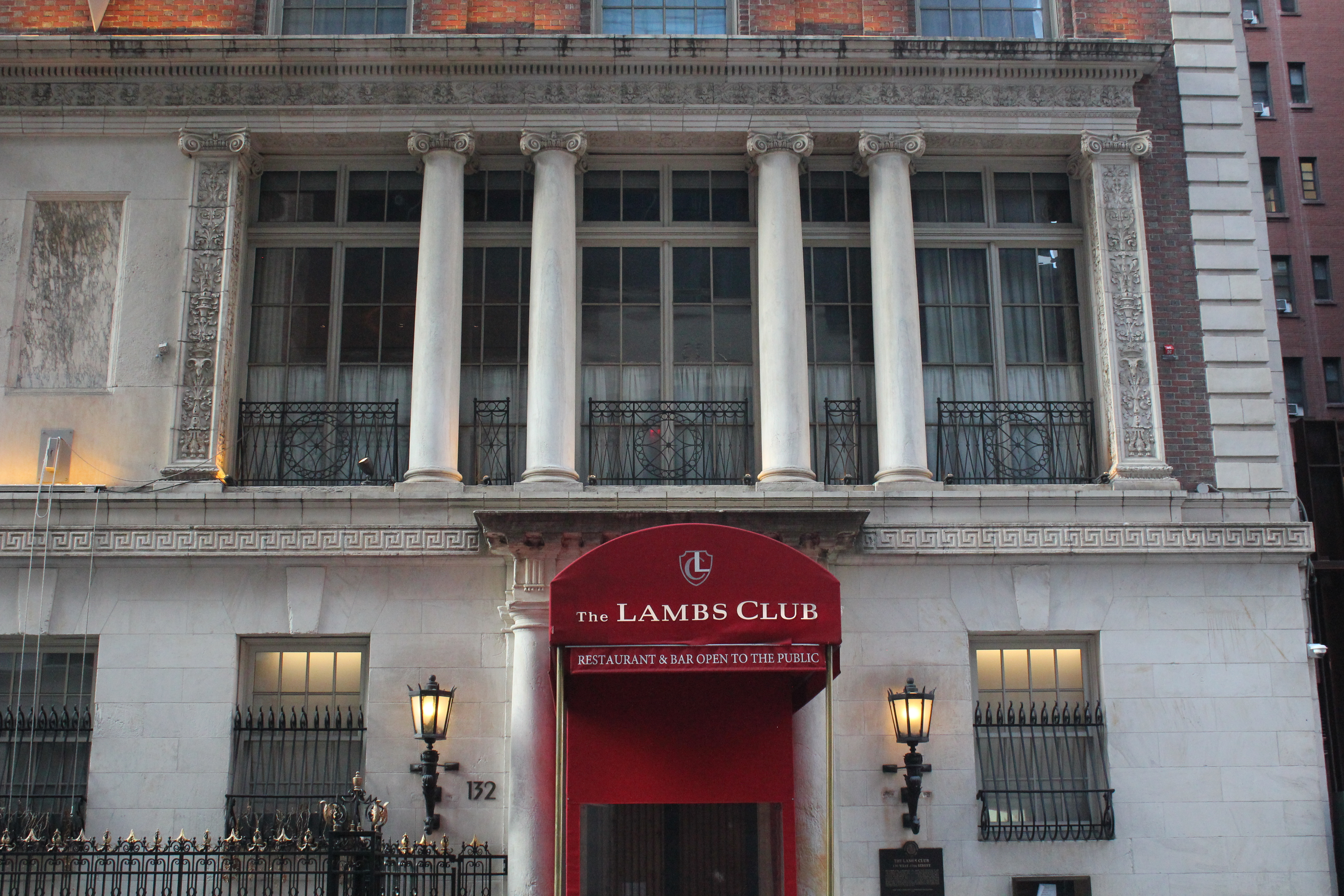
The entrance and second floor

The Lambs filed for Chapter 11 bankruptcy protection in October 1973, after years of declining revenues. The clubhouse was at risk of being foreclosed unless the club raised $1 million. By July 1974, the Lambs owed $450,000 to the Tremont Savings and Loan Association and had not made any mortgage payments for 13 months. To avert foreclosure, the club proposed admitting non-theatrical professionals and women as members, in addition to renting out its theater. Bankruptcy judge Edward J. Ryan gave the Lambs Club a one-month reprieve in August 1974. The same month, the Lambs admitted its first female member, Carolyn Newhouse, whose family was helping raise the $450,000 for the club's mortgage. The Lambs' new general director, Gene Frankel, planned to refurbish the building's theater and add classrooms and rehearsal halls. The New York City Landmarks Preservation Commission (LPC) had begun considering whether to designate the Lambs Club Building as a city landmark in May 1974, and the LPC designated the building as a landmark on September 24, 1974.

In October 1974, Ryan postponed foreclosure proceedings for another six weeks. The club hosted a centennial gala in early December 1974 to raise money for the headquarters, raising $131,250. In addition, the club planned to open a new restaurant and host commercially produced plays. That month, the club successfully petitioned the court to extend the mortgage's due date yet again. The clubhouse was sold at auction the next month to the Tremont Savings and Loan Association for $350,000, even though the building had been appraised at $1.2 million just the previous year. The bank won a bidding war against Giovanna Ceccarelli of the St. Genesius Society, who had bid $301,000 and had wanted to host a repertory theater group at the building. Even after the Lambs Club Building had been sold, the club still owed its suppliers $100,000. To satisfy a deficit of $473,112, the bank immediately placed the building for sale, although the bank was not scheduled to take title until February 20.

=== Church ===
The Manhattan Church of the Nazarene signed a contract in May 1975 to buy the Lambs Club Building. The building was to cost $475,000, although the Tremont Savings and Loan Association required the church to pay $122,500 before the contract could be closed. The church made a $47,500 down payment, of which the Shubert family's Shubert Foundation contributed $15,000. The church intended to use the building for "the enrichment and development of Christian artistic, dramatic, and musical ministries in New York City". The Manhattan Church of the Nazarene was obligated to raise another $30,000 by July 14, 1975, and the national church provided a $50,000 grant six hours before the July 21, 1975, deadline. The church finalized its purchase the next month. The Lambs relocated to the Women's National Republican Club building at 3 West 51st Street, adjacent to Rockefeller Center.

The third-floor theater became an off-Broadway venue called the Lamb's Theatre, which was operated by Carolyn Rossi Copeland's Lamb's Theater Company until 1996. The group operated the first-floor theater by itself and shared the third-floor theater with the church's congregation. The Church of the Nazarene used the building for outreach programs, such as a soup kitchen and a health clinic. The clubhouse also hosted activities and events such as advertising campaigns and Thanksgiving dinners for low-income New Yorkers. The building was added to the National Register of Historic Places on June 3, 1982. The same year, nutritionist Glenna McCollum applied for a grant from the Foundation Center of Manhattan to pay for upgrades to the church's facilities. With the redevelopment of Times Square in the late 1990s, the Lamb's Theatre began to stage more family-friendly productions at the clubhouse, and the third-floor theater was also used for live radio broadcasts.

==== Hotel-conversion agreement ====
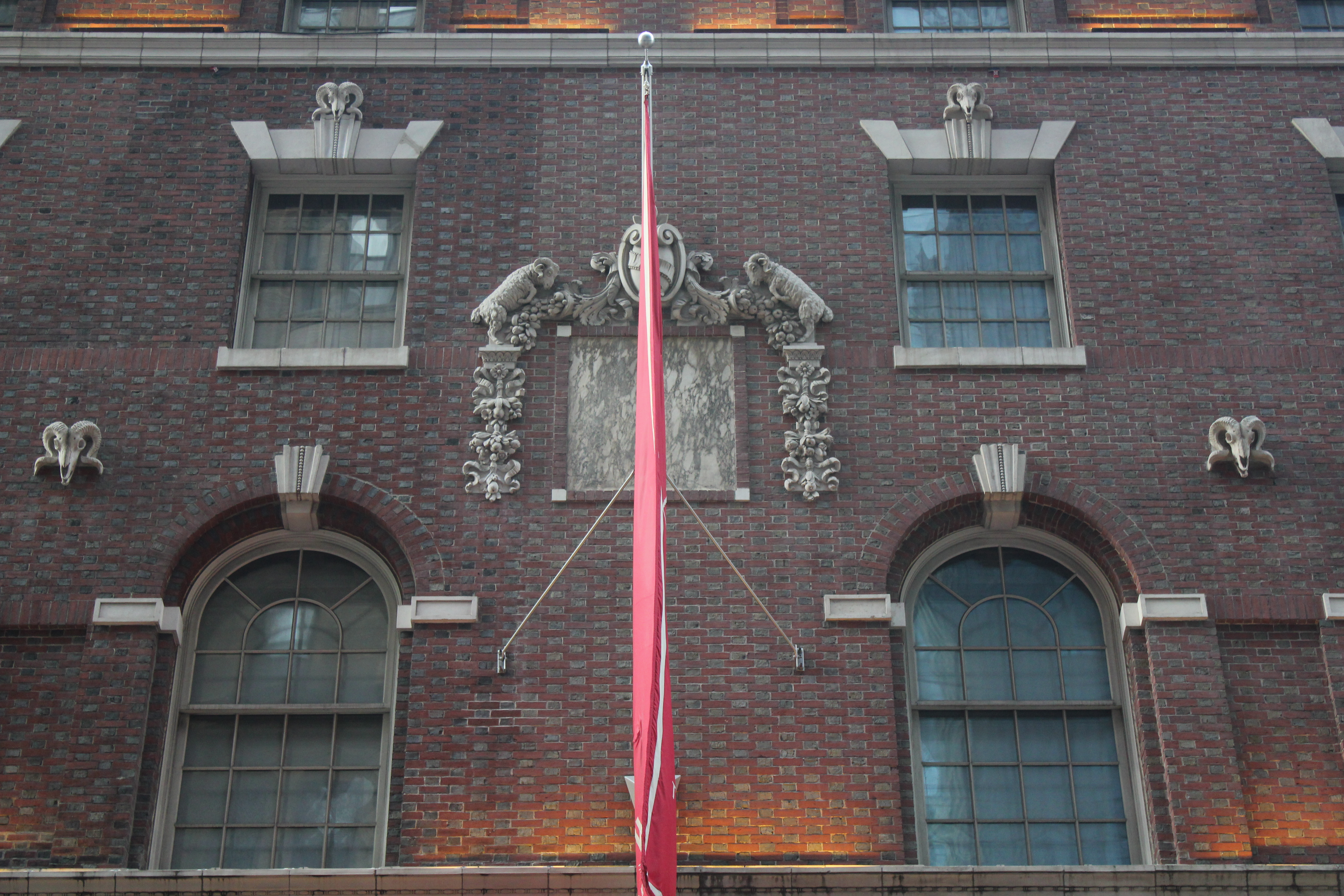
Windows on the upper stories

By the late 1990s, the Church of the Nazarene did not have enough money for both the building's maintenance and the church's social-service programs. This prompted the church's pastor, the Rev. John Calhoun, to announce in early 1999 that he was negotiating with Hampshire Hotels and Resorts to turn the building into a 108-room hotel. The plans necessitated the demolition of the Lamb's Theatre, although the facade and other parts of the interior would be preserved. The church attempted to sell the site's unused air rights, which totaled 75,000 ft^{2} (7,000 m^{2}), but there was no adjacent site to which the air rights could be transferred. Afterward, the church asked the LPC to designate the interior of the building's interior as a landmark, as the air rights of interior landmarks in the Theater District could be transferred to a larger number of buildings in the neighborhood. (Note: New York City zoning sets a maximum floor area for each land lot, after which developers must buy air rights to increase their floor area. Typically, building owners could only sell air rights to developers who owned adjacent sites. Under a 1998 change to New York City's zoning laws, theater owners are allowed to sell their air rights to developers of any lot between Sixth and Eighth Avenues north of 40th Street, regardless of whether the land lots were contiguous.) However, the agency was not allowed to designate the interiors of religious buildings as landmarks.

In a third attempt to dispose of the air rights, the church announced that it would use 25,000 ft^{2} (2,300 m^{2}) of air rights to construct 150 hotel rooms. The church had wanted to build a nine-story hotel, but the LPC mandated that the proposed hotel be reduced to seven stories so the new annex would not be visible from street level. The agreement with Hampshire Hotels was finalized in late 1999. Hampshire Hotels leased the site, and the company received an option to convert the building into a hotel at a later date. Manhattan Initiative was also hired as the property manager, while William Q. Brothers III Architect was hired to draw up plans for the hotel-conversion project. The church was allowed to continue holding services and hosting events within a portion of the clubhouse.

The hotel plans were controversial among the theatrical community, which had unsuccessfully fought for the preservation of several theaters on the site of the nearby New York Marriott Marquis hotel. Performers such as Lionel Hampton and Rosemary Harris advocated for designating the interior of the Lambs Club as a landmark, and Hampshire Hotels was devising plans for a new theater in the Lambs Club building. The church and theater continued to operate, but the church's soup kitchen relocated to Brooklyn in 2001. According to pastor John Bowen, the building was physically deteriorating, and the partnership with Hampshire Hotels would allow the church to offer a wider range of programs. The church continued to host services in the third-floor theater through 2006, while the Lamb's Theatre company staged plays in both of the building's theaters. The building also contained five apartments and 22 single-person rooms at that point.

=== Hotel renovation ===
In 2006, Hampshire Hotels had exercised its option to develop the hotel, and Manhattan Initiative evicted the Lamb's Theatre. At the time, real-estate values in New York City had recovered after having declined sharply following the September 11 attacks; and several other off-Broadway theaters across the city had been displaced by new development during the past two years. Vikram Chatwal, whose family operated Hampshire Hotels, had hired architect Thierry Despont to renovate the edifice into a 101-room hotel. If the church was unable to relocate, Chatwal had to provide space within the building for the church. Chatwal, who initially planned to rebrand the hotel as a boutique hotel called the Lambs Hotel, ultimately renamed it the Chatwal New York. Chatwal signed a franchise agreement with hotel management company Starwood, and the Chatwal New York joined Starwood's Luxury Collection brand. The renovation ultimately cost more than $100 million.

The Chatwal New York opened in August 2010 with 83 rooms. The Lambs Club restaurant at the hotel, which had been announced in 2008, ultimately opened in September 2010 with Geoffrey Zakarian as executive chef. The restaurant, operated by Chatwal, was named in homage to the building's original tenant; it quickly became popular among women who worked in fashion, publishing, and hospitality. Although the Chatwal New York was much smaller than other buildings in the area, Ralph Gardner Jr. of The Wall Street Journal wrote that the hotel "aspires to make up for [this] in amenities—closets inspired by leather Vuitton-like travel trunks; Frette linens, duvets and pillows; and a 'minibar curated by Geoffrey Zakarian'." Elizabeth Arden, Inc., opened its Red Door Spa at the hotel in 2012. The Chatwal New York also sold personalized marriage proposal packages to attract guests.

The hotel closed in March 2020 due to the COVID-19 pandemic. A single worker remained on site to maintain the hotel during its extended closure, turning on all the showers and sinks twice a month and flushing the toilets once a week. The hotel reopened in October 2021, but its restaurant remained closed to the general public, serving only hotel guests. The Lambs Club restaurant reopened in April 2022. when Michael White replaced Zakarian as the executive chef. The Reuben brothers moved to take over ownership of the hotel in December 2023 after the Chatwal's operators defaulted on a mezzanine loan. The Ben-Josef Group, led by Ron Ben-Josef, bought the hotel's ground lease in October 2025 for $53 million. The new owners announced plans to convert the Chatwal New York into the Wolseley Hotel, affiliated with The Wolseley restaurant in London; scheduled to open in 2027, it would be the first of several Wolseley-branded hotels. The Lambs Club restaurant closed in July 2026 in preparation for this conversion.

== Critical reception ==
According to White's grandson Samuel, the building's facade presented "a strictly businesslike character, as if to emphasize the orderly nature of the membership rather than its artistic and presumably extremely entertaining qualities".

After the clubhouse was converted into a hotel, Emirati newspaper The National wrote that the Chatwal New York's "cosy 1920s interiors hark back to a more glamorous era", while Condé Nast Traveller wrote that the hotel "toasts the 'golden age of travel'". A reviewer for the Toronto Star characterized the hotel as an "intimate 76-room property that seamlessly blends the charm of the past and the creature comforts of the present". Another reviewer, writing for The Independent, said the hotel's main draw was "enjoying the peaceful luxury of the hotel while knowing the excitement of Manhattan is right on your doorstep", despite its relatively high room rates, and that the hotel was suitable mainly for "romantic weekends, luxury city getaways and work with perks". A reporter for the British newspaper The Observer praised the hotel as having "the kind of elegance and luxury any self-respecting flapper girl would expect", but the reporter criticized the high prices of the spa and pool.

When the Lambs Club restaurant opened in 2010, Sam Sifton of The New York Times wrote that the restaurant was reminiscent of the nearby Sardi's and that "the Lambs Club dinner menu offers food to fortify the hearty as well as to charm those who eat only appetizers and head to the gym". New York Times reporter Frank Bruni wrote that the restaurant's bar "claims that decorative sweet spot between homage and spoof"; another reporter for that newspaper described the space itself as "a sophisticated, high-ceilinged room in a Stanford White building with a rich history" as the Lambs' headquarters. After the restaurant reopened in 2022, Elise Taylor of Vogue described its ambiance as "new-old New York" and said that, while the restaurant retained many of its original design features, its menu was "dotted with a delicious array of seafood". British newspaper The Times wrote in 2025 that the Chatwal "feels more 'family' than many in the Big Apple", with "stylishly" retro decorations.

== See also ==
- List of hotels in New York City
- List of New York City Designated Landmarks in Manhattan from 14th to 59th Streets
- National Register of Historic Places listings in Manhattan from 14th to 59th Streets
