= Hope and a Little Sugar =

- Directed by: Tanuja Chandra
- Written by: Tanuja Chandra; Glenn Russow
- Produced by: Scott Pardo; Glenn Russow
- Starring: Anupam Kher; Vikram Chatwal; Amit Sial; Mahima Chaudhry; Suhasini Mulay
- Cinematography: Nirmal Jani
- Edited by: Hilary Peabody
- Music by: Wayne Sharpe
- Release date: October 2006
- Running time: 100 minutes
- Countries: India; United States
- Language: English

Hope and a Little Sugar is a 2006 Indian English-language drama film directed by Tanuja Chandra, starring Anupam Kher, Mahima Chaudhry, Vikram Chatwal, Amit Sial, and Suhasini Mulay. It was shot in New York City and premiered on 6 October 2006 at the South Asian International Film Festival in New York. In addition, it was the opening film in 2008 for the Opening Night Gala at BAFTA, sponsored by the London Asian Film Festival by Tongues on Fire.

== Plot ==
Ali (Amit Sial) is a photographer and bike messenger who lives in New York. He develops a friendship and falls in love with a married woman, Saloni Oberoi (Mahima Chaudhry). When her husband, Harry Oberoi (Vikram Chatwal), is killed during the September 11 attacks, Harry's father, a retired Colonel (Anupam Kher), begins to take his aggressions out on Ali for being a Muslim. Although Mrs. Oberoi (Suhasini Mulay) tries to stop the Colonel's behavior, the situation escalates as the Colonel, himself, becomes the target of social post-9/11 aggression directed towards him because he is a Sikh.

== Cast ==
- Anupam Kher as Colonel Oberoi
- Mahima Chaudhry as Saloni Oberoi
- Vikram Chatwal as Harry Oberoi
- Amit Sial as Ali Siddiqui
- Suhasini Mulay as Mrs. Oberoi
- Meghna Malik as Ali's mother

== Production ==
The film was shot in 2004 but was delayed due to "an exhaustive post-production exchange" between director Chandra and independent American producers—Scott Pardo and Glenn Russow. This included pre and post-production that was entirely done via the internet. Pre-production took over two months where Chandra "finalised the cast, locations and even set design sitting in Mumbai." The entire cast and crew consisted of 25 people, and the film was shot entirely in New York over a period of 25 days.

== See also ==
- List of cultural references to the September 11 attacks
