= Vikram Chatwal =

American hotelier and actor (born 1971)

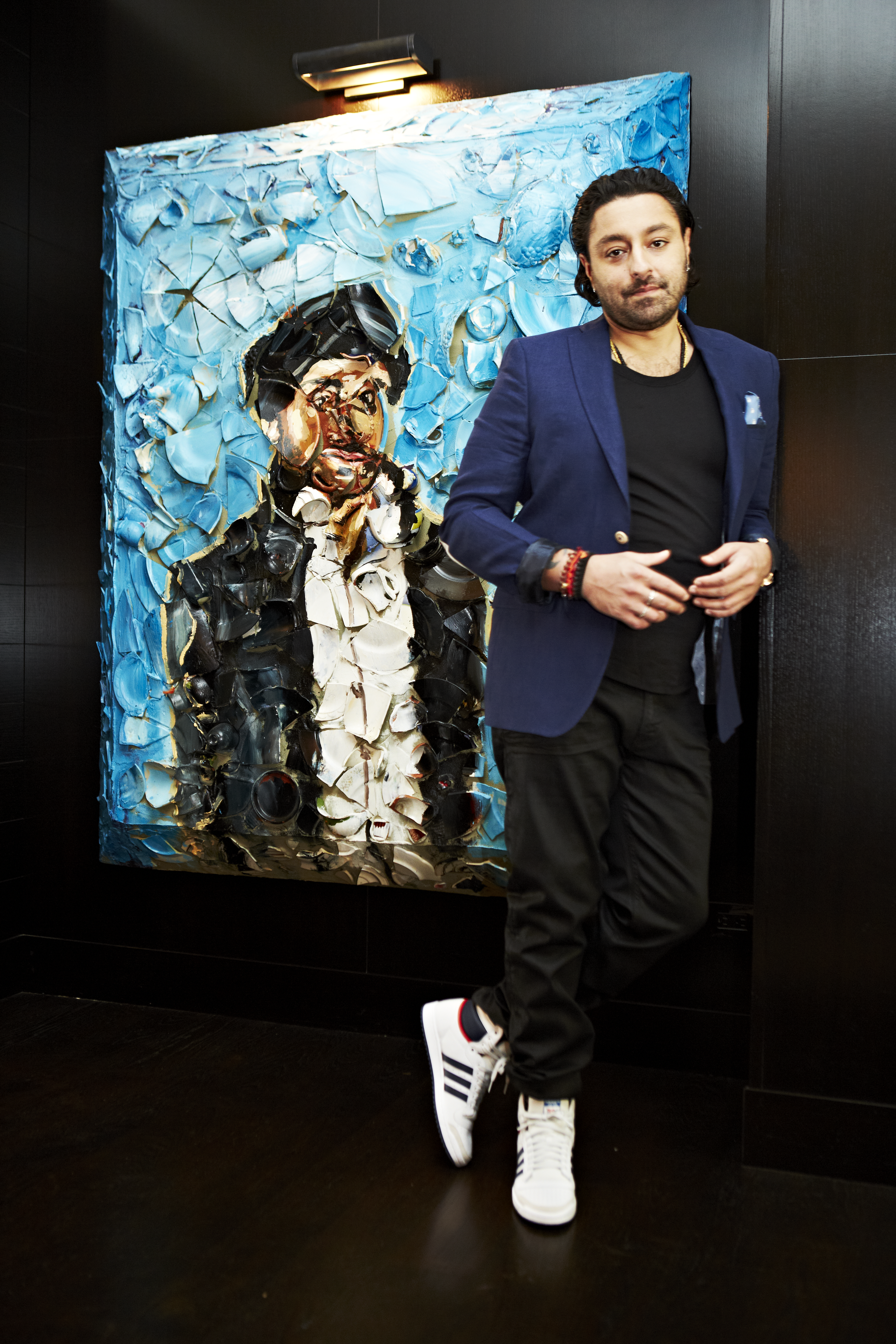
- Born: November 1, 1971 (age 55); Addis Ababa, Ethiopia
- Education: Wharton School of Business
- Spouse: Priya Sachdev (m. 2006; sep. 2011)
- Father: Sant Singh Chatwal

Vikram Chatwal (born November 1, 1971) is an American hotelier and actor.

== Early life and education ==
Chatwal was born in Addis Ababa, Ethiopia and his family moved to Montreal, Quebec, Canada in the 1970s and then to New York City in the 1980s, where his father invested in fine dining and hotels. Chatwal is of Indian Sikh heritage, growing up in a Sikh household and attended Sikh camp in upstate New York where he learned to recite prayers. Chatwal attended the United Nations International School in New York City as well as the Wharton School of Business where he graduated in 1993.

== Career ==
Chatwal's father, Sant Chatwal, founded Hampshire Hotels and Resorts, as well as the Bombay Palace restaurant chain, but in 2014 had to resign as CEO due to an arrest by the FBI on illegal campaign contributions to which Sant Chatwal pleaded guilty in the US District Court, Eastern District of New York getting US$500,000 fine and 1,000 hours community service.

After graduating from Wharton in 1993, Chatwal began working for Morgan Stanley. He worked as an actor and movie producer, landing roles in films such as Zoolander and Honeymoon Travels Pvt. Ltd. He was also a model, and was photographed for Vogue magazine in 1997. Chatwal joined the family business in 1999 and opened the Time Hotel, a luxury hotel in New York City. This was the first of six independent luxury hotels that he initially operated under his company Vikram Chatwal Hotels.

In 2006 Chatwal opened the Night Hotel, in New York's Times Square.

Chatwal's business was affected by the real-estate crisis of the 1990s and in August 2010, it was reported Chatwal's flagship property the Dream Hotel in Manhattan was scheduled to enter foreclosure proceedings within 90 days if he did not make payment on a $99 million mortgage. Despite the economy, Chatwal expanded his hotel-management operations by opening additional hotels in New York City, Miami and overseas. The initial expansion came in 2010 with the opening of the Chatwal Hotel, a $100 million project in the former Lambs Club building in the Theater District of Manhattan. Through his expansions, Vikram has helped grow the Chatwal brand to include additional properties in Manhattan, Miami, Bangkok and Cochin, India.

In 2015, Chatwal's Dream New York hotel completed a $20 million renovation. Updates included a playscape in the ground floor lobby as well as updates to guest rooms and suites. As part of the renovation, the hotel name was changed from Dream New York to Dream Midtown.

Chatwal was awarded the Entrepreneur of the Year Award at the first South Asia Media Awards in New York City in June 2005. He was also featured on the June 19, 2006 cover of Forbes Asia. He is also attributed as revitalizing the hotel industry in Manhattan, opening the Time Hotel during a time when few other hotel groups were investing in the area.

=== Filmography ===
- Zoolander (2001)
- One Dollar Curry (2004)
- Ek Ajnabee (2005)
- Hope and a Little Sugar (2006)
- Karma, Confessions and Holi (2006)
- Honeymoon Travels Pvt. Ltd. (2007)
- Days of Grace (2011)
- Spring Breakers (2012), Executive Producer
- Sold (2014)

== Personal life ==
Chatwal was married to Indian model Priya Sachdev on 18 February 2006. Chatwal and Sachdev were divorced in 2011.

In April 2013, Chatwal was arrested at Fort Lauderdale–Hollywood International Airport in Florida while trying to board an aircraft with cocaine, marijuana and prescription pills. The charges were later dropped.

In 2016, he was arrested again, this time by the New York City police for setting fire to two dogs with an aerosol can and lighter. Chatwal was booked for torturing animals, reckless endangerment and criminal mischief.
