= Children's Letters to God =

- Off-Broadway cast album cover
- Music: David Evans
- Lyrics: Douglas J. Cohen
- Book: Stoo Hample
- Basis: 1991 book by Stoo Hample and Eric Marshall
- Productions: 2004 Off-Broadway

Children's Letters to God was a Drama Desk Award nominated Off-Broadway musical that was based on the best selling book by Stoo Hample, music by David Evans, and lyrics by Douglas J. Cohen.

== Summary ==
The musical is about five young children who are friends that discuss their beliefs, ambitions, uncertainties, and questions about life. Issues brought up in the musical are holidays, loss of a pet, divorces, sibling rivalry, the struggle of being unathletic, and first love. As was the case with the book, the show does not directly address religion. Rather, it just asks questions about life.

The cast has five characters – Joanna (13), Kicker (9), Brett (13), Iris (11) and Theo (11). The role of Kicker is often played by a girl. The musical is 75 minutes in length and has a suggested cast of two women and three men. It is licensed through Concord Theatricals.

== Production ==
Children's Letters to God premiered both at Lyric Stage of Dallas and Harwich Junior Theatre.

The off-Broadway production was put on at Lamb's Theatre. The production was directed was Stafford Arima, musical staging by Patricia Wilcox, set design by Anna Louizos, light design by Kirk Bookman, sound by Peter Hylenski, costume design by Gail Brassard, and produced by Carolyn Rossi Copeland. The cast consisted of Gerard Canonico, Sara Kapner, Jimmy Dieffenbach, Andrew Zutty, and Libby Jacobson. Allison Fischer was an understudy in the production. Previews began on June 19, 2004 and continued on for a six-month run.

In March 2026, a revised version was presented at the Laurie Beechman Theatre for two performances. The cast included Farah Alvin, Jenn Gambatese, Ryan Silverman, Pablo Francisco Torres, and Jason SweetTooth Williams. Don Stephenson directed and Lawrence Yurman was the music director.

== Reception ==
BroadwayWorld praised the cast's performances, calling the show "clever, funny and musically hip." The New York Daily News praised it as "whimsical and charming" and The New York Times said it had a "sweet, warm heart and a fine young cast." The show was nominated for a 2005 Drama Desk Award for Outstanding Lyrics.

== Song list ==
- Prologue – (Company)
- Questions, Questions – (Company)
- Thirteen – (Brett)
- Arnold – (Iris and Company)
- Like Everybody Else – (Theo and Company)
- Questions for the Rain – (Iris and Company)
- Ants – (Kicker)
- A Simple Holiday Song – (Company)
- Six Hours As A Princess – (Joanna)
- An Only Child – (Kicker and Joanna)
- When I Am In Charge – (Company)
- Daydreams – (Company)
- Kicker Brown – (Theo)
- Silly Old Hat – (Brett)
- How Come? – (Company)
- Star Letters – (Iris, Joanna, Theo)
- I Know – (Company)
- I Know (reprise) – (Company)
- Joanna's Lament (Joanna)^

^ cut from the original performance, but featured on the soundtrack
