= The Silly Book =

1961 book by Stoo Hample

- Boodleheimer on the cover
- Author: Stoo Hample
- Illustrator: Stoo Hample
- Cover artist: Stoo Hample
- Publisher: Harper & Brothers
- Publication date: 1961
- OCLC: 560156504
- Dewey Decimal: 818/.5402 21
- LC Class: PN6166 .H36 2004

The Silly Book is a children's book by Stoo Hample, first published in 1961 and reissued in 2004. It includes silly songs, silly names to call people and things, silly recipes, silly poems, silly things to say, and "silly nothings". Hample's first book, it was originally edited by Ursula Nordstrom. It has been described as "a classic pastiche of poems, songs, jokes, drawings and goofy remarks", as a book that "defies categorization", and as "the literary equivalent of a child's giggle fit" and "a humor reference point for countless knee-high baby boomers."

At the starting page, it shows two of the main characters, Boodleheimer and the Easter Bunny (although he looks more like a worm), and is later changed to Mother Goose. It also has a boy and a girl as the main characters, whose names are J.B. and Louise.

The book also inspired an LP called The Silly Record. In 2010, a new edition of The Silly Book was packaged with the first-ever release of The Silly Record on CD.

== Characters ==
- Boodleheimer, A white cat-like creature with a red nose, grey mustaches and tail (a bit of hair) and six toes on each foot.
- The Easter Bunny/Mother Goose, an earthworm with eyes and a nose.
- J.B., one of the main characters
- Louise, one of the main characters
- Tommy, a boy
- Millie, appearing in "Silly Lily" and "Silly Millie"
- Tillie, a lily owned by Millie
- Max, a lily owned by J.B., named "Max" to show Millie "Tillie" is a silly name to call a lily
- Mommy
- Daddy
- A leopard who is asked to pass the salt and peppard
- An alligator asked if she would like to be J.B.'s palligator
- The dentist
- The gas station man
- A growly tiger
- A Moon Goon
- A Very Very Very Very Old Lady (who is five and a half years old)
- Chicken Face (a duck with a chicken mask), who says "Bow-Wow!" when the very very very very old lady tells him that it is raining
- Six Chicks standing on sticks and balanced on bricks
- Big Man that looks like a pig (but is not one because of his feet and says "Tweet, Tweet".)
- Five cats and a dog, with all the cats but one thinking he's a cat and the dog thinking it's silly
- A different Mommy (eating a popsicle)
- A different Daddy (eating a Momsicle)
- A chair combing his hair
- A couch that's a grouch
- A giraffe with a turtle-neck sweater
- A turtle with a giraffe-neck sweater
- A teddy bear who is fed bread with frozen chocolate syrup and spaghetti
- A Silly Something appearing in "Silly Nothings"
- Little Miss Muffet, who plops Fred over the spider
- A pizza named Fred eaten by Little Miss Muffet
- A spider who douses Fred with cider
- Humpty Dumpty, who falls off the wall and all the king's horses and all the king's men have scrambled eggs
- Butterfly
- A Bunny, saying that the book is sally rather than silly, which Boodleheimer had said
- Sally, pointing out that she's Sally to the bunny, who recognizes this with a smile

== Publication data ==
- 1961: The Silly Book (1st ed.). Harper & Brothers.
- 2004: The Silly Book (Reprint ed.). Candlewick. 2004. ISBN 978-0-7636-2256-5.
- 2010: The Silly Book with CD (Rei/Com ed.). Candlewick. 2004. ISBN 978-0-7636-4124-5.
