= Carolyn Rossi Copeland =

- Born: Carolyn Rossi; February 1, 1954 (age 72)
- Education: Tulane University
- Occupations: Theater producer and founder of The Lamb's Theatre
- Years active: 1978–present

Carolyn Rossi Copeland is a theater producer and founder of The Lamb's Theatre located in the Times Square New York City area. She served as Vice President of Creative Affairs for Radio City Entertainment and Madison Square Garden Productions, where she oversaw the historic remount of The Scarlet Pimpernel on Broadway and new projects for The Radio City Rockettes. She served as Creative Consultant for The Gaylord Group. She is the executive producer of Strouse IP, managing the music and show catalogue of the Tony Award winner Charles Strouse.

She received her B.A. in Political Science from Newcomb College in New Orleans, Louisiana, in 1976.

== Shows ==
- The Gift of the Magi (Off-Off-Broadway, 1986) Director
- Godspell (Off-Broadway, 1988) Producing Director
- The Gift of the Magi (Off-Broadway, 1988) Producing Director
- The Revelation of John (Off-Broadway, 1989) Producing Director
- Smoke on the Mountain (Off-Broadway, 1990) Producer
- Opal (Off-Broadway, 1992) Producing Director
- Johnny Pye and the Foolkiller (Off-Broadway, 1993) Producing Artistic Director
- john & jen (Off-Broadway, 1995) Producer
- Smoke on the Mountain (Off-Broadway, 1998) Producer
- The Prince and the Pauper (Off-Broadway, 2002) Producer
- The Gospel of John (Off-Broadway, 2003) Producer
- Silent Laughter (Off-Broadway, 2004) Producer
- Children's Letters to God (Off-Broadway, 2004) Producer
- The God Committee (Off-Broadway, 2006) Producer
- Flamingo Court (Off-Broadway, 2008) Executive Producer
- Flamingo Court (Off-Broadway, 2009) Producer
- Freud's Last Session (Off-Broadway, 2010) Producer
- Freud's Last Session (Off-Broadway, 2011) Producer
- Amazing Grace (Chicago, 2014) Producer
- Amazing Grace (Broadway, 2015) Executive Producer
- Indian Joe (Goodspeed, 2015) Executive Producer
