= Stoo Hample =

American writer

- Hample drawing in 1948. The photo was retouched to include the cartoon image of himself at a later date.
- Born: January 6, 1926; Binghamton, New York
- Died: September 19, 2010 (aged 84); Manhattan, New York
- Occupations: Writer, illustrator, comics artist
- Writing career
- Years active: 1946–2010
- Genres: Children's books, humor, theater
- Notable works: The Silly Book, "Children's Letters to God"

Stuart E. Hample (January 6, 1926 – September 19, 2010), also known as Stoo Hample, was an American children's book author, performer, playwright and cartoonist who sometimes used the pseudonyms Joe Marthen and Turner Brown Jr. He is best known for the books Children's Letters to God and The Silly Book, and the comic strip Inside Woody Allen. He is the father of baseball collector Zack Hample.

== Early life ==
Hample began drawing before kindergarten. At the age of 17, he enlisted in the United States Navy and served for two years in the Submarine Service during World War II. He attended Williams College and graduated from the University at Buffalo in 1950 with a B.A. in English and drama.

== Career ==
In 1946, while working in advertising, he began performing as a musical cartoonist with symphony orchestras at children's and pops concerts, drawing in strict rhythm with the music. In 1948 he was the writer and star of the evening comedy show Cartoon Capers on WBEN-TV in Buffalo, NY and also of a children's show called Junior Jamboree on the same station. He was sometimes a guest host on the NBC Children's show Birthday House when the regular host, Paul Tripp, was unavailable. In the 1950s he appeared regularly on the CBS-TV children's program Captain Kangaroo as "Mister Artist."

In 1955–56, he was an assistant to Al Capp. A subsequent stint in advertising ended when he created the syndicated comic strip Inside Woody Allen. Because he simultaneously had another comic strip, Rich and Famous, running with a different syndicate, he briefly employed the pseudonym Joe Marthen, a conglomeration of the names of his children, Joe, Martha, and Henry.

During this period his first play, Alms for the Middle Class, had a simultaneous world premiere at the Pittsburgh Public Theater and Geva Theater (Rochester, New York) and was produced on Earplay, the dramatic workshop of National Public Radio. At the time of his death, he was working on All the Sincerity In Hollywood, a one-character play based on the life of radio comedian Fred Allen. The play had several readings directed by Austin Pendleton and starring Dick Cavett.

== Works ==
=== Books ===
- The Silly Book (1961)
- Mr. Nobody & the Umbrella Bug (1962)
- Doodles the Deer-Horse (1963)
- Children's Letters to God (1966) (co-edited with Eric Marshall)
- More Children's Letters to God (1967) (co-edited with Eric Marshall)
- Blood for Holly Warner (1967)
- My Darling Mao (1968)
- Black Is (1969 - under pseudonym Turner Brown Jr.)
- God is a Good Friend to Have (1969)
- Stoo Hample's Silly Joke Book (1978)
- Non-Being & Somethingness (1978)
- Hugging, Hitting & Other Family Matters (1979)
- Yet Another Big, Fat, Funny Silly Book (1980)
- Children's Letters to God (1991) (co-edited with Eric Marshall)
- Dear Mr. President (1993)
- Grandma, Grandpa & Me (1997)
- Me & My Dad (1999)
- My Mom's the Best Mom (2000)
- All the Sincerity in Hollywood (2001)
- You Stink! I Love You (2003)
- Happy Cat Day (2004)
- I Will Kiss You: Lots & Lots & Lots (2006)
- Stoo Hample's Book of Bad Manners (2006)
- Dread & Superficiality: Woody Allen as Comic Strip (2009)
- The Silly Book With CD (2010)

=== Plays ===
- Alms for the Middle Class
- The Asshole Murder Case
- Paint the Icebergs
- The Most Trusted Man in America
- All the Sincerity in Hollywood

=== Musicals ===
- The Fig Leaves Are Falling (uncredited bookwriter; music by Albert Hague, lyrics by Allan Sherman)
- The Selling of the President (co-bookwriter with Jack O'Brien; music by Bob James, lyrics by O'Brien)
- Children's Letters to God (bookwriter; music by David Evans, lyrics by Douglas Cohen)

=== Television ===
- Children's Letters to God (NBC Special)
- The Great Radio Comedians (PBS Special)
- Kate & Allie (CBS)
- That Girl in Wonderland (ABC - animated pilot)
- Festival of Family Classics: Snow White and the Seven Dwarfs (ABC - animated)

=== Comic strips ===
- Inside Woody Allen
- Rich & Famous
- Children's Letters to God

=== Magazines ===
- Weekly humor page in New York Magazine called "The Apple," illustrated by Seymour Chwast, 1968
- Weekly humor page in New Times Magazine called "Fellow Citizens," illustrated by Seymour Chwast, 1969
- Monthly cartoon page in Cat Fancy Magazine called "Tiger's Tales," 2006
