= Stuck (2017 film) =

- Theatrical release poster
- Directed by: Michael Berry
- Screenplay by: Michael Berry; Riley Thomas
- Based on: Stuck by Riley Thomas
- Produced by: Joe Mundo; Mike Witherill
- Starring: Giancarlo Esposito; Arden Cho; Amy Madigan; Ashanti; Omar Chaparro; Gerard Canonico
- Cinematography: Luke Geissbühler
- Music by: Ben Maughan; Riley Thomas; Timothy Young
- Production companies: SpeakEasy Films; MJW Films
- Distributed by: Eammon Films
- Release dates: April 23, 2017 (NBFF); April 19, 2019 (United States)
- Country: United States
- Language: English

Stuck is a 2017 musical drama film directed by Michael Berry, who also wrote the screenplay with Riley Thomas, whose stage musical the film is based on. It stars Giancarlo Esposito, Arden Cho, Amy Madigan, Ashanti, Omar Chaparro and Gerard Canonico.

The film had its world premiere at the Newport Beach Film Festival on April 23, 2017. It was released on April 19, 2019, by Eammon Films.

== Premise ==
Six strangers get stuck together on a stalled subway train in New York City and all of them have a story to tell.

== Cast ==
- Giancarlo Esposito as Lloyd
- Arden Cho as Alicia
- Amy Madigan as Sue
- Ashanti as Eve
- Omar Chaparro as Ramon
- Gerard Canonico as Caleb
- Sienna Luna as Ramon's daughter Mila
- Madison Blas as Ramon's daughter Elena

== Production ==
In July 2014, Giancarlo Esposito, Amy Madigan, and Ashanti joined the cast of the film, with Michael Berry directing from a screenplay he co-wrote with Riley Thomas, who also wrote the play the film is based upon.

== Release ==
The film had its world premiere at the Newport Beach Film Festival on April 23, 2017. It was released on April 19, 2019, by Eammon Films.

== Reception ==
On the review aggregator website Rotten Tomatoes, 50% of 20 critics' reviews are positive. Metacritic, which uses a weighted average, assigned the film a score of 36 out of 100, based on 6 critics, indicating "generally unfavorable" reviews.
