= Geoffrey Cuthbertson =

English cricketer

Personal information
- Full name: Geoffrey Bourke Cuthbertson
- Born: 23 March 1901; Hampstead, London, England
- Died: 9 August 1993 (aged 92); Lingfield, Surrey, England
- Batting: Right-handed
- Relatives: Edward Cuthbertson (brother)

Domestic team information
- Years: Team
- 1920 to 1922: Cambridge University
- 1920: Sussex
- 1921 to 1927: Middlesex
- 1935 to 1938: Northamptonshire

Career statistics
Competition	First-class
Matches	79
Runs scored	1991
Batting average	15.19
100s/50s	0/6
Top score	96
Balls bowled	–
Wickets	–
Bowling average	–
5 wickets in innings	–
10 wickets in match	–
Best bowling	–
Catches/stumpings	32/0
- Source: Cricinfo, 23 September 2014

Geoffrey Bourke Cuthbertson (23 March 1901 – 9 August 1993) was an English amateur cricketer who played first-class cricket from 1920 to 1938. He captained Northamptonshire in 1936 and 1937.

== Early career ==
Cuthbertson was educated at Malvern College, where he played for the First XI. He went up to Cambridge University, playing occasional first-class matches as an opening batsman for the university team from 1920 to 1922 without winning a Blue, and making a top score of 67 against Army in 1920.

He played one match for Sussex in 1920, then joined Middlesex, playing occasional matches from 1921 to 1927 with a top score of 58 against Kent in 1925. He also played for Marylebone Cricket Club (MCC) (he was a member of the club for 74 years) and Free Foresters, and toured the US with Incogniti in 1924.

== Northamptonshire career ==
After a period out of the first-class game he joined Northamptonshire in 1935. Northamptonshire had finished last in the County Championship, with two wins, in 1934, and in 1935 they won only one match and finished last again. Cuthbertson was appointed to captain the side in 1936 and 1937, but the side did not win a match under his captaincy, and in fact went from May 1935 to May 1939 without a victory in 101 matches. "Not surprisingly," said Wisden, "he was remembered by team-mates as a genial optimist, as well as a bold batsman."

He batted in the middle order for Northamptonshire, scoring 1214 runs in 43 matches at an average of 15.97, with a highest score of 96 against Lancashire in 1937.

== Personal life ==
He served in the Royal Air Force in World War II. His elder brother Edward, who also played for Cambridge University, was killed in action in Mesopotamia in World War I.
