= Inside Woody Allen =

American comic strip by Stuart Hample

- Panel from Inside Woody Allen
- Author: Stuart Hample
- Current status/schedule: Finished
- Launch date: October 4, 1976
- End date: April 8, 1984
- Publisher: King Features
- Genre(s): Gag-a-day, Celebrity comics

Inside Woody Allen is an American gag-a-day celebrity comics comic strip about the comedian and filmmaker Woody Allen. Drawn by Stuart Hample, the strip ran from October 4, 1976, to April 8, 1984.

The strip's first year was credited to a pseudonym, Joe Marthen. Hample's name appeared on the strip starting September 19, 1977.

== Characters and story ==
The strip was based on Allen's comedic persona and focused on his neuroses, angst, sexual frustration and frequent psychiatric treatment.

Writers for the strip included David Weinberger.

== Collected editions ==
A collection of some strips was published in 1978 as Non-Being and Somethingness: Selections from the Comic Strip Inside Woody Allen (ISBN 0-394-73590-0) and features an introduction by Buckminster Fuller. Another volume, Dread and Superficiality: Woody Allen as Comic Strip was published in 2009 (ISBN 0810957426).

Stuart Hample's Inside Woody Allen (January 27, 1980).

== In Annie Hall ==
Allen's 1977 film Annie Hall contains an animated sequence based on Hample's artwork, though the actual animation was done by Chris Ishii.

== See also ==
- List of newspaper comic strips
