= Sant Singh Chatwal =

Indian-American businessman (born 1946)

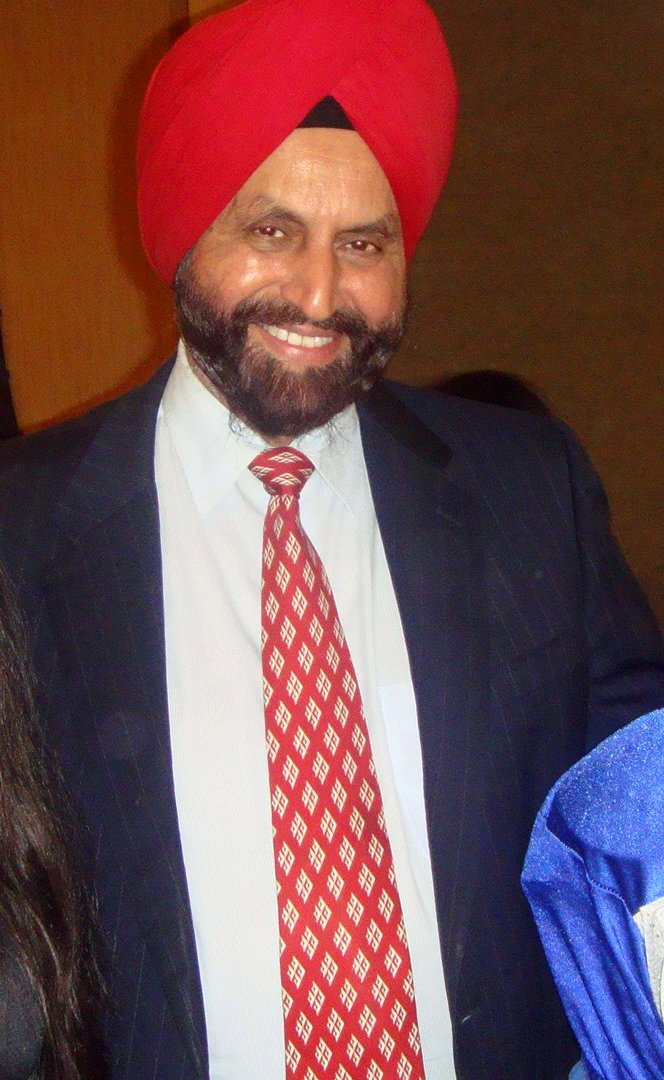
- Sant Singh Chatwal at Asian American Human Rights watch event in New York City
- Born: 1946 (age 79–80)
- Occupations: Founder and chair, Dream Hotel Group
- Children: Vikram Chatwal, Vivek Chatwal
- Awards: Padma Bhushan

Sant Singh Chatwal is an Indian American businessman and founder of the Dream Hotel Group where he is chair of the board. He has founded numerous hotel brands including The Chatwal, Dream Hotels, Time Hotels, and Unscripted Hotels, which operate in the United States and internationally.

== Early life ==
Born to a Sikh family, Chatwal's family were refugees that fled Western Punjab in British India during the Partition of India in 1947. He was one year old when the family left with his four brothers and three sisters. They settled in Faridkot, Punjab, India where the family became small merchants. He joined the Indian Armed Forces at the age of 18 where, according to Chatwal, he served as a fighter pilot on the country's first and only aircraft carrier, INS Vikrant. Chatwal grew up on the Sikh traditions of his family.

== Career ==
Chatwal left India in 1967 for Addis Ababa, Ethiopia, to work for the country's commercial airliner. When he arrived he was told he would be required to take off his turban, cut his hair, and remove his beard. He declined due to his Sikh heritage.

He then became a teacher in a local public school and became friends with the owner of a restaurant who asked him to fill in for a few months when he became ill. He improved the business and was later asked to become a partner, later buying out the other owner. In the course of time he became the owner of two restaurants serving Indian cuisine.

In 1975, he left the country with some of his savings and opened a restaurant in Montreal, Quebec, Canada. Chatwal also entered the hotel business while in Canada, purchasing his first hotel in 1976. In 1979, he opened Bombay Palace, the first fine-dining Indian restaurant in Midtown Manhattan. Chatwal expanded Bombay Palace internationally, opening restaurants in London, Hong Kong, and Canada, and eventually becoming a publicly traded company.

He continued to acquire hotels, adding properties in Florida in 1980 and New York in 1982. He later combined all his properties into Hampshire Hotels & Resorts. He suffered from the real estate crisis in the 1990s and was forced to file Chapter 11 bankruptcy. It was then he began to bring in investors as partners and focused on lifestyle branding of hotels, opening properties in New York, Los Angeles, and internationally. By 2006, he was the largest independent owner of hotels in the United States, operating 13 hotels with 3,000 rooms valued at $750 million.

Chatwal was close to former US President Bill Clinton and his family, and made substantial financial donations to his election campaigns, as well as to other causes and campaigns of the Democratic Party, engaging prominent representatives of the party. He has accompanied the Clintons on journeys to India, and was a Trustee of the William J. Clinton Foundation. In April 2014, he pled guilty to giving illegal campaign contributions to three federal candidates, including Clinton, between 2007 and 2011. He was fined $500,000 and sentenced to probation and community service.

Hampshire Hotels & Resorts rebranded in 2015 to Dream Hotel Group. Chatwal remained as the chairman of the board and a new CEO was appointed to the group

== Personal life ==
In 2010, then Indian President Pratibha Patil awarded Chatwal the Padma Bhushan, India's third-highest civilian honor.

== See also ==
- Indians in the New York City metropolitan region
- Sikh American
