= Vasili Tsereteli =

Russian sculptor

- ზურაბ წერეთელი Василий Церетели
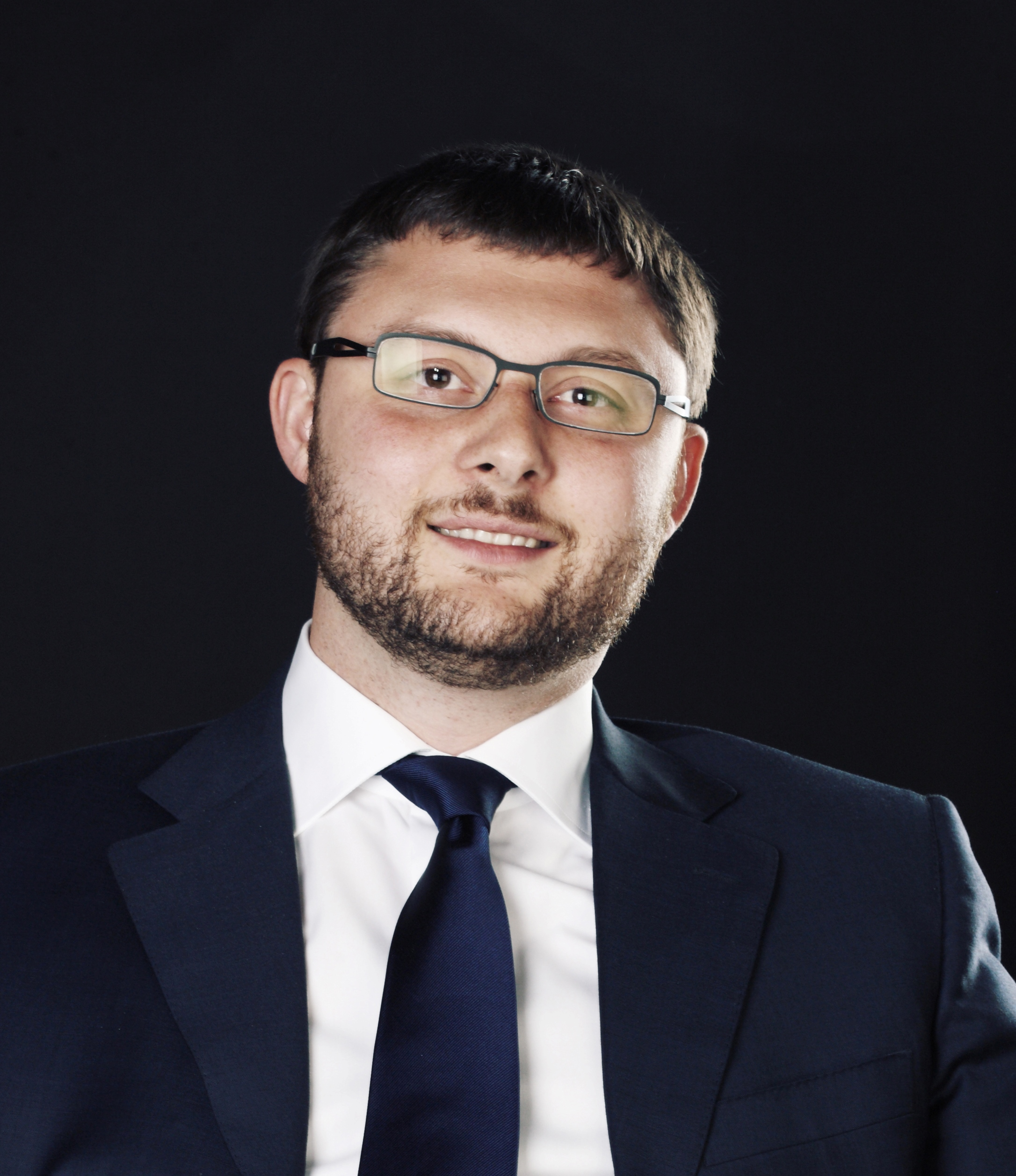
- Tsereteli in 2020
- Born: Vasily Zurabovich Tsereteli; 31 January 1978; Tbilisi, Georgian SSR
- Awards

Vasili Zurabovich Tsereteli (Russian: Василий Зурабович Церетели born 31 January 1978) is a Russian-Georgian artist, executive director of the Moscow Museum of Modern Art, President of the Russian Academy of Arts. Member of the public council of the Russian Jewish Congress.

== Education ==
Born in 1978 in Tbilisi. In 1996 graduated from United Nations International School, New York. Studied at the Parsons The New School for Design and the School of Visual Arts, from which he graduated in 2000 with a Bachelor of Arts degree. In 2012, he received an EMBA from the Skolkovo Moscow School of Management.

== Career ==
In 2002 Vasili Tsereteli has become an Executive Director of the Moscow Museum of Modern Art, founded in 1999. Commissioner of the Ministry of Culture of Russia at International Exhibitions in Venice. From 2006 to 2010 Vasili was a Commissioner of the Russian Pavilion at the Venice Biennale. Vasili Tsereteli is President of the Russian Academy of Arts, member of the Moscow Union of Artists, the Union of Artists of Russia, member of the Presidium of International Council of Museums, member of CIMAM. Vasili Tsereteli is a member of the jury of the Kandinsky Prize, a member of the jury of Sergei Kuryokhin prize for Contemporary Art, a member of the organizing committee of the Moscow International Biennale for Young Art, art-director of the International "Territory" Festival, commissioner of the Ministry of Culture of the Russian Federation at the international exhibitions in Venice. Vasili Tsereteli is member of the jury of the All-Russian contest of ideas of literary sites "Litsled", and a member of the Board of Trustees of the Foundation "Support for children and families in difficult situations."

== Honours and awards ==
- Chevalier of the Order of Arts and Letters of France, 2015.
- Officer of the Royal Order of Isabella the Catholic of Spain, April 14, 2016.

== Family ==
- Father - Zurab Tsereteli, a Georgian-Russian painter, sculptor and architect.
- Wife - Kira Sacarello Tsereteli, fashion designer.
- Daughter - Imperia Tsereteli
- Sons - Alexander Tsereteli, Nikolai Tsereteli, Philippe Tsereteli

== References and sources ==
=== Bibliography ===
- Карл Аймермахер, Евгений Барабанов, Александр Боровский, Галина Маневич и др. Нонконформисты. Второй русский авангард, 1955—1988. Собрание Бар-Гера / Ханс-Петер Ризе. — Кёльн: Wienand, 1996. — P. 92—96. — 320 p. — ISBN 3879094960.[11]
- Ольга Шихирева, Жан-Клод Маркадэ, Морис Тухман, Александр Боровский и др. Абстракция в России. Каталог выставки в Государственном Русском музее / Анна Лакс. — Санкт-Петербург: Palace Editions, 2001. — 814 p. — (Государственный Русский музей (альманах)). — ISBN 978-5-93332-059-3.
