= The Alchemedians =

1986 Off-Broadway play

The Alchemedians was an Off-Broadway play that was put on in 1986 at the Lamb's Theatre in New York City, New York. It premiered at Brooklyn Academy of Music's Next Wave Festival.

== Cast ==
Conception and choreography was by Bob Berky and Michael Moschen, directed by Ricardo Velez and Joan Langue, lighting design by Jan Kroeze, set and prop design by John Kahn, music by David Van Tieghem, costume design by Mei-Ling Lui, production manager was Dave Feldman. It was presented by Brooklyn Academy of Music.

The cast consisted of Bob Berky, Michael Moschen, and Fred Garbo.

== Plot ==
The plot revolves around the two clowns. Moschen was a juggler, and Berky was a clown. The show was full of juggling, clowning, and mime. "Laboratory" is the first acts title.
