= Johnny Pye and the Fool-Killer =

- Music: Randy Courts
- Lyrics: Mark St. Germain; Randy Courts
- Book: Mark St. Germain
- Basis: Johnny Pye and the Fool-Killer by Stephen Vincent Benét
- Productions: 1984 La-Pensee Discovery! Theater (Seattle); 1993 Off-Broadway

Johnny Pye and the Fool-Killer was an Off-Broadway musical with music by Randy Courts, the book by Mark St. Germain, and lyrics by Randy Courts and Mark St. Germain based on the story of the same name by Stephen Vincent Benét. It was originally performed at Seattle's La Pensee Discovery! Theatre in 1993 and ran at Lamb's Theatre from October 21, 1993, and closed on December 12, 1993, after 54 performances.

== Synopsis ==
The story follows an all-American boy, Johnny Pye, beginning in 1928. Following the death of his father, he sees the Fool-Killer, a personification of death: a deformed, portly workman wearing a smock and cap and toting a grindstone. It shows Johnny his aspirations: Johnny wants to be a doctor, then a painter, then a minister, but ends up being the postmaster in his hometown of Martinsville.

Over the course of the show, the Fool-Killer can only be seen by Johnny. When they first meet, Johnny angrily challenges him. Johnny later leaves to serve in World War II. When he returns after nearly dying, he steals the girl of his dreams from his arch-enemy Wilbur. Over several decades (the show ends in 1995), Johnny sees many of his loved ones carried off by the Fool-Killer. Johnny makes a deal with Death early in their relationship: if Johnny can solve a riddle that the Fool-Killer presents, then Johnny's life will be spared. The second act deals with the happy marriage of Johnny and Suzy, and the births of their children, grandchildren and eventually great-grandchildren. Johnny’s memory fails and he can't remember any of their names.

== Original Cast ==
It was directed by Drew Scott Harris, musical staging by Janet Watson, set by Peter Harrison, costumes by Claudia Stephens, lighting by Kenneth Posner, sound by David Lawson, musical direction by Steven M. Alper, orchestrations by Douglas Besterman, and production stage manager was David Waggett.

It starred Daniel Jenkins as Johnny Pye, Spiro Malas as Foolkiller, Kaitlin Hopkins as Suzy Marsh, Peter Gerety as Wilbur Wilberforce, Tanny McDonald as Mrs. Miller, Ralston Hill as Barber, Mark Lotito as Bob, Michael Ingram as Bill, Conor Gillespie as Young Johnny Pie, and Heather Lee Soroka as Young Suzy Marsh.

== Song list ==
- Another Day
- Goodbye Johnny
- Shower of Sparks
- Occupations
- Handle With Care
- The End of the Road
- Challenge To Love
- The Barbershop
- Married With Children
- The Land Where There Is No Death
- Time Passes
- Never Felt Better In My Life
- Epilogue (The Answer)
- Finale
