= Smoke on the Mountain =

Off-Broadway musical that was written by Connie Ray and conceived by Alan Bailey

Smoke on the Mountain is an Off-Broadway musical with a book by Connie Ray and conceived of and directed by Alan Bailey. It was originally workshopped at the McCarter Theatre in 1988, given a full staging at the McCarter in 1990, and was subsequently moved by the McCarter to Lamb's Theatre in New York City, New York in 1990 and had 475 performances. The Lamb's revived it in 1998. The name of the musical comes from Psalm 104:32: "He who looks at the earth, and it trembles, who touches the mountains, and they smoke". Smoke on the Mountain is one of the most produced shows worldwide.

== Productions ==
The original production's sets were by Peter Harrison, lighting by Mary Jo Dondlinger, costumes by Pamela Scofield, musical direction by John Foley, musical arrangements by Mike Craver and Mark Hardwick, production stage manager was Erika Feldman, and technical supervision by Joseph L. Robinson. The associate producer was Nancy Nagel Gibbs. Presented by Carolyn Rossi Copeland and Marie B. Corporation.

It is believed that the longest continuous run of Smoke On the Mountain is at the Cumberland County Playhouse in Crossville, Tennessee, first directed by Terry Sneed. The opening on May 30, 2014 for 22 scheduled performances represented the 21st consecutive year the play has been performed there.

== Notable casts ==
Actor	1998 Lamb's Theatre
Burl Sanders	Bobby Taylor
Stanley	John Griffith
Vera Sanders	Constance Barron
Dennis Sanders	Sean Dooley
Denise Sanders	Dionne McGuire Gardner
June Sanders	Jonah Marsh
Pastor Mervin Oglethorpe	Robert Olsen

== Plot ==
Most of the songs in Smoke on the Mountain are old hymns, with some original and anachronistic bluegrass songs mixed in. The cast plays their own instruments. (Some productions have non-speaking players arrive as additional 'family members'.) Each character has a monologue and a featured song. It is performed in two acts.

The setting is in a Mount Pleasant, North Carolina Baptist church in 1938 and it revolves around the Sanders family. The Sanders Family is delayed from performing at the musical revival. Reverend Oglethorpe is forced to get the service going by playing "Rock of Ages" for those in attendance. Rev. Oglethorpe stalls for time by giving announcements. The Sanders Family enters with great gusto, after revealing their automobile tipped over into a ditch after the whole family leaned to one side of the car to look at all the pickles floating downstream from the Mount Pleasant Pickle Factory. They start the service by singing "The Church in the Wildwood" and introduce themselves to the congregation ("A Wonderful Time Up There"). Burl is the patriarch, Stanley is Burl's brother, Vera is the family matriarch, Denise and Denis are fraternal twins, and June does interpretive signs. The first act ends as June and Denise begin to "dance" (a simple foot kick and hip slap of a tambourine). This upsets the pious Miss Maude and Miss Myrtle (who are the only two known to be in attendance). The dance prompts a stern talking to from the reverend to the girls because the church "doesn't dance." Upset, Stanley leaves in a huff. Burl and Denis leave to go find him, leaving Vera finishing the song through tears of embarrassment.

When the family returns, the service continues. During "Whispering Hope" it is implied that June is flirting with the reverend. The family is excited to perform one of their signature "medleys". The family ends the night by quoting the titular bible verse/song, Psalm 104:32: "He who looks at the earth, and it trembles, who touches the mountains, and they smoke."

== Song list ==
- I'll Fly Away
- The Church in the Wildwood
- Built on the Rock
- Wonderful Time up There
- No Tears in Heaven
- Christian Cowboy
- The Filling Station
- I'll Never Die
- Jesus Is Mine
- Blood Medley
- I'll Live Again
- I Wouldn't Take Nothing for My Journey Now
- Angel Band
- Bringing In the Sheaves
- Whispering Hope
- I'm Using My Bible for a Road Map
- I'll Walk Every Step of the Way
- I'm Taking a Flight
- Smoke on the Mountain
- When the Roll Is Called up Yonder

== Sequels ==
Connie Ray and Alan Bailey issued two sequels to Smoke on the Mountain.

The story continues with the sequel, Sanders Family Christmas, released in 1999 (with musical arrangements by John Foley and Gary Fagin). The setting is 1941 and the family has gathered together for a Christmas sing at Mt. Pleasant Baptist Church before Dennis is shipped off to the Pacific in World War II.

A third production was released in 2006, entitled Smoke on the Mountain Homecoming (with musical arrangements by Mike Craver). The setting is October 1945. The war is over and Rev. Oglethorpe has received a call to preach in West Texas. The Sanders Family has come together for one last sing at Mt. Pleasant Baptist Church before the family disbands.
