= Lamb's Theatre =

Former off-Broadway theater

- Address: 130 West 44th Street; New York City; United States
- Owner: Carolyn Rossi Copeland
- Capacity: 350
- Type: Thrust
- Current use: Demolished

Construction
- Opened: 1905 (as Lambs Club auditorium 1981 (as off-Broadway theater)
- Closed: 2007
- Years active: 1981–2007
- Architect: Stanford White

Website
- www.lambstheatre.org/

Lamb's Theatre was an Off-Broadway theater located at 130 West 44th Street, Manhattan, New York City inside the Manhattan Church of the Nazarene, near Times Square in New York City. It seated approximately 350 and specialized in musical productions. The building was built in 1904–1905 and was designed by Stanford White as the headquarters of the theater club The Lambs.

In 2007, the venue was closed to make way for the Chatwal New York hotel.

== History ==
The six-story Lambs Club Building originally housed a fraternal club of theater professionals called The Lambs, taking after a club in England started by Charles Lamb in 1868. The members included Fred Astaire, Mark Twain, and Douglas Fairbanks Jr.

In the mid-1970s, the Manhattan Church of the Nazarene bought the Lamb's building for the sake of making it into a mission. The Lambs club moved to 3 West 51st Street in 1975. In 1978, Lamb's Theatre Company was created by Carolyn Rossi Copeland and it hosted the successful "Broadway for Kids" series. In 1981, the renovated 3rd floor theatre had its first show, Cotton Patch Gospel and was penned the "Gem of Times Square". With a list of over 50 productions or stages, in 1984 they opened a Lamb's Little Theatre on the first floor.

== Performance history ==
- 1981: Cotton Patch Gospel
- 1982: Snoopy! The Musical
- 1982: Puff The Magic Dragon
- 1983: Breakfast with Les and Bess
- 1983: Painting Churches
- 1984: The Gift of the Magi
- 1985: Dames at Sea
- 1986: The Alchemedians
- 1986: Olympus on My Mind
- 1987: Funny Feet
- 1988: Godspell
- 1990: Smoke On The Mountain
- 1992: Opal
- 1991: Final Departure
- 1993: Johnny Pye and the Fool-Killer
- 1995: John & Jen
- 1996: I Do! I Do!
- 1997: John, His Story
- 1999: Thoroughly Modern Millie
- 2000: The Countess
- 2002: The Prince and the Pauper
- 2003: That Day in September
- 2004: Silent Laughter
- 2004: Children's Letters to God
- 2004: Cam Jansen
- 2005: Picon Pie
- 2006: The Man in the Iron Mask
