= As It Is in Heaven (play) =

As It Is In Heaven
- Written by: Arlene Hutton
- Characters: 9 Female
- Original language: English
- Setting: 1830s Shaker Community

Premiere
- Date premiered: 2001
- Place premiered: United States

As It Is In Heaven is a play by playwright/actor/director Arlene Hutton. It premiered at 78th Street Theater Lab, followed by performances at the Edinburgh Fringe Festival and at the Off-Broadway Arclight Theatre in New York City, where it ran from January 11 to February 5, 2002. The title comes from the Shaker song "The Saviour's Universal Prayer (Our Father Who Art in Heaven)", a Shaker rendition of the Lord's Prayer. The play is published by Dramatists Play Service, Inc.

== Background ==
Attending the Edinburgh Fringe Festival in 1995, where her first plays were produced, Hutton saw a play about Scottish female farm workers that intrigued her and inspired her to seek an American equivalent to its characters. Hutton wrote the play after visiting the Pleasant Hill Shaker Village near Harrodsburg, Kentucky, a restored community that the Shakers occupied for more than a century. For her play about a pre-Civil War Shaker community in which several young women claim to see celestial visions, she did three years of research. One of the startling discoveries she made was that the Kentucky community whose history she was studying had contained several distant relatives of hers, with the same surname.

A work with an all-female cast, As It Is in Heaven was first performed at the Edinburgh Fringe Festival in 2001. A production was scheduled to open at off-Broadway’s 78th Street Theatre Lab in New York City on September 13 of that year. Two days prior, the September 11 attacks occurred, and on that night, the cast members responded by rehearsing the Shaker hymns performed in the play. The production later opened as planned. In 2008, the play was performed in Shakertown, in Pleasant Hill, Kentucky, the place that had first inspired it, and it was revived in New York in 2011.

== Song list ==
The songs used were (as requested by the author) to be sung a cappella.

Year	Type of music	Song title	Author(s)	Shaker Village origin
1829	Song	I Never Did Believe	Betsy Bates	New Lebanon, New York
1835	Song	Come Life, Shaker Life	Issachar Bates	New Lebanon, New York
1838	Song	My Carnal Life I Will Lay Down		South Union, Kentucky
1838	Song	Come Dance And Sing Around The Ring		New Lebanon, New York
1840s	Song	I Will Bow And Be Simple	Mary Hazard	New Lebanon, New York
1840s	Song	Who Will Bow And Bend Like A Willow		Enfield, New Hampshire
1840s	Hymn	O Sisters Ain't You Happy	Clarissa Jacobs	New Lebanon, New York
1845	Hymn	O Father Who Art In Heaven		New Lebanon, New York
1847	Song	Hop Up And Jump Up		Shirley, Massachusetts
1848	Song	'Tis The Gift To Be Simple	Joseph Brackett Jr.	Alfred, Maine
1852	Hymn	Glory Unto God We'll Sing		Enfield, New Hampshire
1864	Song	Come To Zion	Paulina Bates	New Lebanon, New York
1869	Song	Welcome, Welcome Precious Gospel Kindred		Enfield, New Hampshire
1870	Song	Come The Fest Is Ready		Canterbury, New Hampshire
1870s	Hymn	If Ye Love Not Each Other (More Love)		Canterbury, New Hampshire

== Critical reception ==
The work has been well-received by critics. Calling Hutton "one of the most richly humane voices in contemporary theater," F. Kathleen Foley of Los Angeles Times described As It Is in Heaven as “amusing, intellectually stimulating and moving – a beautifully crafted piece that will endure.” The critic of The Village Voice, Alexis Soloski, noted that "the scenes of the women working and living together are wonderful for their very Shaker-like qualities: simplicity, unpretentiousness, attention to detail," although Soloski claims that the playwright "weaves in a dramatic arc that never seems as finely worked as the rest of the play." Anita Gates in The New York Times, reviewing the New York revival, described As It Is in Heaven as a "modest, strangely moving one-act," which "is also an unexpected patchwork of high and low cultural influences," including The Age of Innocence, The Crucible and even The Book of Mormon.

American Theatre Web said that "Hutton... once again looks into a slice of Americana... while showing that even a 'utopian' existence such as the Shakers' was not without complications... Hutton asks some universal questions about the nature of community and belief that are timeless and also prove to be good fodder for storytelling on stage... As It Is in Heaven contains a story that deserves to be told." A review on TheaterMania.com stated that "What Hutton does that is so fascinating is to show us people who appear to be the very picture of goodness and brings out their eccentricities and frailties. [She] is excellent at drawing comedy from the situation... to its satisfying and inspiring conclusion".
