= Edward Cuthbertson =

English cricketer

Personal information
- Full name: Edward Hedley Cuthbertson
- Born: 15 December 1887; Hackney, Middlesex, England
- Died: 24 July 1917 (aged 29); Al Amarah, Basra Vilayet, Ottoman Iraq
- Batting: Left-handed
- Role: Wicket-keeper
- Relatives: Geoffrey Cuthbertson (brother)

Domestic team information
- Years: Team
- 1906–1913: Hertfordshire
- 1908–1910: Cambridge University
- 1914: Marylebone Cricket Club

Career statistics
Competition	First-class
Matches	3
Runs scored	32
Batting average	6.40
100s/50s	–/–
Top score	18
Catches/stumpings	4/3
- Source: Cricinfo, 7 July 2019

Edward Hedley Cuthbertson (15 December 1887 – 24 July 1917) was an English first-class cricketer.

The son of Edward Hedley Cuthbertson and his wife, Alice Cuthbertson, he was born at Hackney in December 1887. He was educated at Malvern College, before going up to Clare College, Cambridge. While studying at Cambridge, he made his debut in first-class cricket for Cambridge University against Sussex at Fenner's in 1908. He made just one further first-class appearance for Cambridge, two years later against the same opposition. Although he did not gain a blue in cricket while at Cambridge, he did gain a blue in football having appeared for Cambridge University A.F.C. He had made his debut in minor counties cricket for Hertfordshire in 1906, making 25 appearances in the Minor Counties Championship between 1906–13. He later made a first-class appearance for the Marylebone Cricket Club against Cambridge University at Lord's in 1914.

After graduating from Cambridge, he joined the London Stock Exchange in 1911 as a stockbroker. Cutherbertson served in the First World War, enlisting as a second lieutenant on probation in the Royal Warwickshire Regiment in November 1914, with confirmation in the rank in March 1915. He was promoted to the rank of lieutenant in August 1916. While serving in the Mesopotamian campaign, Cuthbertson fell ill on 20 July 1917 with heat exhaustion after fourteen days in Mesopotamia. He was admitted to hospital at Al Amarah, where his condition continued to deteriorate over the next three days. He died on the evening of 23 July and was buried at the Amara War Cemetery. His brother, Geoffrey Cuthbertson, also played first-class cricket.
