= Screamfest Horror Film Festival =

Annual event in Los Angeles, US

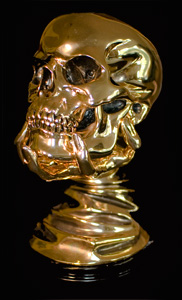
- The Screamfest Skull Award, designed by Stan Winston
- Location: Los Angeles, U.S.
- Founded: 2001
- Language: International
- Website: screamfestla.com

Screamfest Horror Film Festival is a horror film festival founded by film producers Rachel Belofsky and Ross Martin in August 2001. Its first edition was October 24 to October 25, 2001 at the Vogue Theatre on Hollywood Boulevard. It runs over ten days during the month of October and is hosted at the TCL Chinese 6 Theatres in Los Angeles. In 2025, the festival celebrates its twenty-fifth anniversary and has been credited as being the largest and longest running horror film festival in the United States.

Screamfest premieres and showcases new work from American and international independent horror filmmakers. Films that have premiered at the festival include Paranormal Activity, the series' final installment, Paranormal Activity: The Ghost Dimension, 30 Days Of Night, Let The Right One In, The Grudge, and The Human Centipede.

Screamfest has received praise from AMC as being an "audience-friendly fest that celebrates indie and foreign horror and is run for the fans more than the industry". The festival was also featured in a 2012 episode of Cupcake Wars, where the winning team would create cupcakes for the festival's closing VIP event.

== Skull Awards ==
The Screamfest Skull Award is awarded at the festival in several categories, which can include the following:

- Best Feature
- Directing
- Cinematography
- Editing
- Special Effects
- Musical Score
- Best Animation
- Best Short
- Best Documentary
- Best Student Film
- Trailblazer Award
- Future Icon Award

Career achievement awards are also occasionally awarded at the festival.

== Convention history ==
Dates	Location	Awards
October 24–25, 2001	Vogue Theater Hollywood Boulevard; Hollywood, California	Most Creative Short: Earth Day; Best Student Short: The Appointment; Best Animation: Blood: The Last Vampire; Best Screenplay: Vampire's Hell; Best Short Screenplay: The Bloated Beetle; Honorable Mention Screenplays: Shadows of Life, Abductions; Best Special Effects: Cradle of Fear; Best Editing: Cradle of Fear; Best Cinematography: Deep in the Woods; Best Makeup: Night of the Headsman; Best Actor: Jeff Rector (Fatal Kiss); Best Actress: Jennifer De Martino (The Appointment); Audience Choice Award: Night of the Headsman; Best Director: Jeff Rector (Fatal Kiss); Best Foreign Film: Blood: The Last Vampire; Best Film: Y2K
October 17–20, 2002	TCL Chinese 6 Theatres; Hollywood, California	Best Short: Repossessed; Best Student Short: Off; Best Animated Short: Puphedz; Best Horror Comedy Short: Bad Father; Best Screenplay: Bloodlines; Best Horror Comedy Screenplay: Ravenna; Best Short Screenplay: Reset; Best Special Effects: Curse of the Forty-Niner; Best Cinematography: R.S.V.P.; Best Makeup: Kolobos; Best Actor: Rick Otto (R.S.V.P.); Best Actress: Marianne Hayden (Ghostwatcher); Best Documentary: ISPR Investigates: The Ghosts Of Belgrave Hall; Best Director: Todd Ocvirk and Daniel Liabtowitsch (Kolobos); Best Foreign Film: Ju-On: The Grudge; Best Picture: Kolobos; Career Achievement Award: William Friedkin
October 10–19, 2003	TCL Chinese 6 Theatres; Hollywood, California	Best Short: Ice Cold; Best Student Short: 3AM; Best Animated Short: Deadtime Stories; Best Horror Comedy Short: R.I.P.; Best Editing: A Tale of Two Sisters; Best Special Effects: Ghost System; Best Cinematography: A Tale Of Two Sisters; Best Makeup: Sangre Eterna; Best Musical Score: Ghost System; Best Actor: Juan Pablo Ogalde (Sangre Eterna); Best Actress: Im Soo-jung (A Tale Of Two Sisters); Best Short Screenplay: Souls; Best Screenplay: Desolate; Best Director: Kim Jee-woon (A Tale Of Two Sisters); Best Picture: A Tale Of Two Sisters; Career Achievement Award: Wes Craven
October 15–24, 2004	TCL Chinese 6 Theatres; Hollywood, California	Best Short: El Ciclo; Best Student Short: The Taking; Best Animated Short: Day Off The Dead; Best Documentary: H. H. Holmes: America's First Serial Killer; Best Editing: The Invisible; Best Special Effects: Cube Zero; Best Cinematography: The Invisible; Best Makeup: Cube Zero; Best Musical Score: Drowning Ghost; Best Actor: Gustaf Skarsgård (The Invisible); Best Actress: Tuva Novotny (The Invisible); Best Short Screenplay: Lock Up; Best Screenplay: The Domain; Best Director: Mikael Håfström (Drowning Ghost); Best Picture: The Invisible; Career Achievement Award: Stan Winston
October 14–23, 2005	TCL Chinese 6 Theatres; Hollywood, California	Best Short: Staring At The Sun; Best Student Short: Dead West; Best Animated Short: Little Dead Girl; Best Horror Comedy Short: Zombie Movie; Best Editing: Brasil; Best Special Effects: The Cabinet of Dr. Caligari; Best Cinematography: The Cabinet Of Dr. Caligari; Best Makeup: Severed: Forest of the Dead; Best Musical Score: The Echo; Best Actor: Brad Hunt (Cookers); Best Actress: Cyia Batten (Cookers); Best Screenplay: Nightfall; Best Director: Dan Miintz (Cookers); Best Picture: Cookers; Audience Choice Award: The Cabinet Of Dr. Caligari; Career Achievement Award: Sean S. Cunningham
October 13–22, 2006	TCL Chinese 6 Theatres; Hollywood, California	Best Short: Happy Birthday To You; Best Editing: The Beach Party At The Threshold Of Hell; Best Special Effects: Frostbite; Best Cinematography: The Marsh; Best Makeup: Frostbite; Best Musical Score: Frostbite; Best Actor: Marc Sentner, (The Lost); Best Actress: Essie Davis (Isolation); Best Screenplay: Childish Things; Honorable Mention: The Tripper, The Beach Party At The Threshold Of Hell; Best Director: Billy O'Brien (Isolation); Best Picture: Isolation; Career Achievement Award: Clive Barker
October 12–21, 2007	TCL Chinese 6 Theatres; Hollywood, California	Best Short: In The Wall; Best Student Short: Angel; Best Editing: Alone; Best Special Effects: Storm Warning; Best Cinematography: Alone; Best Makeup: Inside; Best Musical Score: Storm Warning; Best Actor: Everon Jackson Hooi (Dead End); Best Actress: Katie Featherston (Paranormal Activity); Boost Mobile's Best of the Next in Horror: Stem; Honorable Mention: Oren Peli; Audience Choice Award: Wasting Away; Best Director: Banjong Pisanthanakun and Parkpoom Wongpoom (Alone); Best Picture: Alone
October 10–19, 2008	TCL Chinese 6 Theatres; Hollywood, California	Best Short: Detour; Best Student Short: Citizen; Best Editing: Splinter; Best Special Effects: Splinter; Best Cinematography: El rey de la montaña; Best Makeup: Splinter; Audience Choice Best Documentary: Spine Tingler!! The William Castle Story; Best Musical Score: Splinter; Best Actor: Leonardo Sbaraglia (El rey de la montaña); Best Actress: María Valverde (El rey de la montaña); Best Screenplay: Haunted High; Audience Choice Award: Trick 'r Treat; Honorable Mention: Dance of the Dead; Boost Mobile's Best of the Next in Horror: Clown
October 16–25, 2009	TCL Chinese 6 Theatres; Hollywood, California	Best Short: Harry Doright's Prelude To Hell; Best Student Short: Else; Best Editing: Before The Fall; Best Special Effects: The Revenant; Best Cinematography: Before The Fall; Best Makeup: The Revenant; Best Musical Score: The House of the Devil; Best Actor: Victor Clavijo (Before The Fall); Best Actress: Jocelin Donahue (The House Of The Devil); Best Screenplay: Hate Night; Best Director: F. Javier Gutiérrez (Before The Fall); Best Picture: The Human Centipede
October 8–17, 2010	TCL Chinese 6 Theatres; Hollywood, California	Best Short: The Legend Of Beaver Dam; Best Editing: The Pack; Best Special Effects: The Pack; Best Cinematography: Black Death; Best Makeup: Needle; Best Musical Score: Black Death; Best Actor: Sean Bean (Black Death); Best Actress: Zoé Félix (Caged); Best Screenplay: Controlled; Best Director: Christopher Smith (Black Death); Best Picture: Caged
October 14–22, 2011	TCL Chinese 6 Theatres; Hollywood, California	Best Short: The Little Mermaid; Best Editing: Urban Explorer; Best Special Effects: The Tunnel; Best Cinematography: Crawl; Best Makeup: Urban Explorer; Best Musical Score: The Innkeepers; Best Actor: Klaus Stiglmeier (Urban Explorer); Best Actress: Georgina Haig (Crawl); Best Director: Paul China (Crawl); Best Picture: Urban Explorer
October 12–20, 2012	TCL Chinese 6 Theatres; Hollywood, California	Best Short: Incident on Highway 73; Best Animated Short: PostHuman; Best Horror Comedy Short, Killer Kart; Best Student Short: Eaglewalk; Best Editing: On Air; Best Special Effects: Crawlspace; Best Cinematography: American Mary; Best Makeup: American Mary; Best Musical Score: Crawlspace; Best Actor: Pierre-Francois Legendre (Fear of Water); Best Actress: Katharine Isabelle (American Mary); Best Director: The Soska Sisters (American Mary); Best Picture: American Mary; Career Achievement Award: John Carpenter
October 8–17, 2013	TCL Chinese 6 Theatres; Hollywood, California	Best Short: Luna by Antonio Perez; Best Student Short: Aftermath by Jeremy Robbins; Best Editing: Olivier Beguin for Chimeres; Best Special Effects: JD Schwalm for Beneath; Best Visual Effects: Jamison Goei for Beneath; Best Cinematography: Timothy A. Burton for Beneath; Best Makeup: Gary Tunnicliffe for Beneath; Best Musical Score: Bruno Grife for Goldberg & Eisenberg; Best Actor: Yahav Gal for Goldberg & Eisenberg; Best Actress: Rosie Day for The Seasoning House; Best Director: Ben Ketai for Beneath; Best Picture: Beneath; Screamfest Launchpad Award Sponsored by Matador Pictures: The Banishing by Erlingur Thoroddsen
October 14–23, 2014	TCL Chinese 6 Theatres; Hollywood, California	Best Short: The Landing directed by Josh Tanner; Best Horror Comedy Short: Dead Hearts directed by Stephen W. Martin; Best Student Film: Slut directed by Chloe Okuno; Best Editing: Sverrir Kristjánsson for Julia; Best Musical Score: Frank Hall for Julia; Best Makeup: Brian Spears for Julia; Best Actress: Ashley C. Williams for Julia; Best Actor: Matthew Gray Gubler for Suburban Gothic; Best Special Effects: Dark Was the Night; Best Visual Effects: Dark Was the Night; Best Cinematography: James Swift for White Settlers; Best Director: Alejandro Hidalgo for The House at the End of Time; Best Picture: The House at the End of Time; Best Screenplay: Asylum by Michael Strode and Eric Wostenberg
October 13–22, 2015	TCL Chinese 6 Theatres; Hollywood, California	Best Short: Daddy's Little Girl; Best Student Short: Massacre in San Jose by Edgar Nito; Best Musical Score: James Gosling for The Hallow; Best Editing: Patchwork; Best Makeup: The Hallow; Best Actress: Tory Stolper for Patchwork; Best Actor: Neville Archambault for Slumlord; Best Special Effects: The Hallow; Best Cinematography: Martijn Van Broekhuizen for The Hallow; Best Director: Corin Hardy for The Hallow; Best Picture: Patchwork; Best Screenplay: Blackvoid by Joseph J. Greenberg
October 18–27, 2016	TCL Chinese 6 Theatres; Hollywood, California	Best Short: A Nearly Perfect Blue Sky; Best Student Short: Pigskin by Jake Hammond; Best Editing: My Father Die; Best Actor: Johnny Galecki for The Master Cleanse; Best Musical Score: Justin Small & Ohad Benchetrit for My Father Die; Best Actress: Mimosa Willamo for Lake Bodom; Best Makeup: The Master Cleanse; Best Cinematography: Joe Dietsch for Happy Hunting; Best Special FX: Nicholas Podbrey, Werner Pretorius & Creature FX Artists for The Master Cleanse; Best Visual FX: George A. Loucas for The Master Cleanse; Best Unproduced Screenplay: Plum Island; Best Director: Sean Brosnan for My Father Die; Best Picture: My Father Die
October 10–19, 2017	TCL Chinese 6 Theatres; Hollywood, California	Best Picture: Tigers Are Not Afraid; Best Director: Issa López for Tigers Are Not Afraid; Best Cinematography: Ferdinando D'Urbano for The Laplace's Demon; Best Special FX: Giordano Giulivi for The Laplace's Demon; Best Visual FX: Giordano Giulivi & Alessandro Zonfrilli for The Laplace's Demon; Best Actor: Juan Ramón López for Tigers Are Not Afraid; Best Actress: Paola Lara for Tigers Are Not Afraid; Best Makeup/Creature Effects: Tragedy Girls; Best Editing: Joaquim Marti for Tigers Are Not Afraid; Best Musical Score: Duccio Giulivi for The Laplace's Demon; Best Horror Comedy: Dead Ant; Best Short: Please Love Me Forever by Holy Fatma; Best Unproduced Screenplay: U-666 by Jacqueline Perez; Career Achievement Award: Marianne Maddalena
October 9–18, 2018	TCL Chinese 6 Theatres; Hollywood, California	Best Picture: Tumbbad; Best Director: Daniel Robbins for Pledge; Best Cinematography: Davide Piazzolla for You Die; Best Special Effects: Crazy Pictures for The Unthinkable; Best Visual Effects: Gajjar Parth for Tumbbad; Best Actor: Thomas Hedengran for Draug; Best Actress: Suzanne Voss for Dementia II; Best Makeup: Josh & Sierra Russell for Open 24 Hours; Best Editing: Nik Voytas for Pledge; Best Musical Score: Klas Persson for Draug; Best Short: I Am The Doorway by Simon Pearce; Best Animated Short: La Noria; Best Screenplay: Dead Strays by Neil Chase
October 8–17, 2019	TCL Chinese 6 Theatres; Hollywood, California	Best Picture: Eat, Brains, Love; Best Director: Gille Klabin for The Wave; Best Cinematography: Louise McLaughlin for Resin; Best Special Effects: Eric Thelander for The Wave; Best Visual Effects: Patrick Lawler for The Wave; Best Actor: Justin Long for The Wave; Best Actress: Sarah Bolger for A Good Woman is Hard to Find; Best Makeup: Kristal Shannon for Eat, Brains, Love; Best Editing: Lana Wolverton for The Wave; Best Musical Score: Tim Williams for We Summon the Darkness; Best Short: Bad Hair; Best Student Short: Progeny; Best Screenplay: Fang and Claw by Troy Sloan
October 6–15, 2020	Regency Theater Plant Drive-In Van Nuys, California	Best Picture: A Ghost Waits; Best Director: Adam Stovall for A Ghost Waits; Best Cinematography: Tim Tregoning for Sweet River; Best Special Effects Makeup: Geir Njarðarson for Thirst; Best Visual Effects: Atli Þór Einarsson for Thirst; Best Actor: MacLeod Andrews for A Ghost Waits; Best Actress: Lisa Kay for Sweet River; Best Editing: Baptiste Rouveure for Anonymous Animals; Best Musical Score: Damien Maurel for Anonymous Animals; Best Short: Vikaari by Sandun Seneviratne; Best Comedy Short: Kalley's Last Review by Julia Bailey Johnson; Best Student Short: The Rule of Three by Elwood Quincy Walker; Best Screenplay: Bloody Mary by Dan Ast and John C. Thursby
October 12–21, 2021	TCL Chinese 6 Theatres; Hollywood, California	Best Picture: Nocturna: Side A - The Great Old Man's Night; Best Director: Gonzalo Calzada for Nocturna: Side A - The Great Old Man's Night; Best Cinematography: Carlos Ritter for What Josiah Saw; Best Special Effects: What Josiah Saw; Best Visual Effects: Let the Wrong One In; Best Actor: Pepe Soriano for Nocturna: Side A - The Great Old Man's Night; Best Actress: Libby Ewing for When I Consume You; Best Special Effects Makeup: Shannon Mulligan & KC Mussman for The Retaliators; Best Editing: Alejandro Narvaez for Nocturna: Side A - The Great Old Man's Night; Best Musical Score: Leonardo Martinelli for The Returned (Los Que Vuelven); Best Short: The Light (La Luz) by Iago de Soto; Best Screenplay: Hangman by JC Doler and Paul Petersen
October 11–20, 2022	TCL Chinese 6 Theatres; Hollywood, California	Best Cinematography: Mihkel Soe for Melchior The Apothecary; Best Editing: Marion Koppel for Melchior The Apothecary; Best Special Effects Makeup: The Goldsmith; Best Special Effects: Deer Camp '86; Best Musical Score: Bradley Katzen for The Domestic; Best Screenplay: Recovery by Robert Cosci; Best Short: La Nueva directed by Ivan Villamel; Best Horror Animated Short: Buzzkill directed by Peter Ahern; Best Horror Comedy Short: D.O.D. directed by Paul Davis; Best Student Short: The Night Nurse directed by Tim Delaney; Best Actor: Tumisho Masha for The Domestic; Best Actress: Jasmina Douieb for Employee of the Month; Critics’ Choice Award: Everyone Will Burn (Y Todos Arderán); Best Picture: 8 Found Dead; Best Director: Travis Greene for 8 Found Dead
October 10–19, 2023	TCL Chinese 6 Theatres; Hollywood, California	Short Film Audience Choice Award: Red Velvet directed by Blake Simon; Best Screenplay: Fragments by Jake Moses; Best Student Short: Voyager directed by Pablo Pagan; Best Animated Short Film: Lands of Steel directed by Cyril Vrancken; Best Short Film: The Looming directed by Masha Ko; Best Actor: Victor Clavijo for La Espera (The Wait); Best Actress: Jennifer Kim for Somewhere Quiet; Best Musical Score: Darren Lim for You’ll Never Find Me; Best Special Effects Makeup: The Deep Dark; Best Special Effects: The Deep Dark; Best Editing: Sofi Marshall for Somewhere Quiet; Best Cinematography: Alain Duplantier for The Deep Dark; Best Director: Olivia West Lloyd for Somewhere Quiet; Best Picture: The Deep Dark directed by Mathieu Turi
October 8–17, 2024	TCL Chinese 6 Theatres; Hollywood, California	Best Directing: Thibault Emin for Else; Best Picture: Else; Best Cinematography: Léo Lefèvre for Else; Best Editing: Kate Hickey for Cold Wallet; Best Special Effects: Florence Thonet & Anne Van Nyen for Else; Best Musical Score: June Ha and Shida Shahabi for Else; Best Actress: Anneke Sluiters for Witte Wieven; Best Actor: Matthieu Sampeur for Else; Best Short Film: Be Right Back; Best Animated Short Film: Dagon; Best Student Short: Leaving Yellowstone; Audience Award: Berta; Best Screenplay: The Deadhead by Justin Ballheim
October 7–16, 2025	TCL Chinese 6 Theatres; Hollywood, California	Best Picture: Don’t Leave The Kids Alone; Best Director: Emilio Portes for Don’t Leave The Kids Alone; Best Cinematography: Martin Boerge for Don’t Leave The Kids Alone; Best Musical Score: Aldo Max Rodríguez for Don’t Leave The Kids Alone; Best Editing: Steven J. Mihaljevich for Shed; Best Special Effects: Amazing Ape Productions & Action Pants FX for Deathgasm 2: Goremageddon; Best Makeup: Patrick Baxter & Jason Dethridge for Deathgasm 2: Goremageddon; Best Actress: Mani Shanks for Shed; Best Actor: Rodrigo Noya for The Dollmaker; Short Film Audience Award: Very Prosperous Men by Josiah Walker; Best Short Film: The Last Snow by Rodolphe Bouquet-Populus; Best Animated Short Film: Franken Struck by Sommar Boulware; Best Student Short: Terroir by Casey Rogerson; Best Screenplay (Screamfest Horror Film Festival Screenplay Competition): High Rise by Anthony Di Pietro

== See also ==
- List of fantastic and horror film festivals
