= List of films about mental disorders =

This is a non-exhaustive list of films which have portrayed mental disorders.

Inclusion in this list is based upon the disorder as it is portrayed in the canon of the film, and does not necessarily reflect the diagnosis or symptoms in the real world.

== Agoraphobia ==
- What About Bob? – 1991 – character of Bob Wiley played by Bill Murray
- Copycat – 1995 – character of Helen Hudson played by Sigourney Weaver
- The Aviator – 2004 – character of Howard Hughes played by Leonardo DiCaprio
- Intruders – 2015 – character of Anna Rook played by Beth Riesgraf
- Phobia – 2016 – character of Mehak Deo played by Radhika Apte

== Antisocial personality disorder ==
(Antisocial Personality Disorder should also include psychopathy and sociopathy.)

- Badlands – 1973 – character of Kit Carruthers played by Martin Sheen
- One Flew Over the Cuckoo's Nest – 1975 – character of Randle McMurphy played by Jack Nicholson
- Wall Street – 1987 – character of Gordon Gekko played by Michael Douglas
- Falling Down – 1993 – character of William "D-Fens" Foster played by Michael Douglas
- The Talented Mr. Ripley – 1999 – character of Tom Ripley played by Matt Damon
- Training Day – 2001 – character of Alonzo Harris played by Denzel Washington
- Monster – 2003 – character of Aileen "Lee" Wuornos played by Charlize Theron
- Nightcrawler – 2014 – character of Louis Bloom played by Jake Gyllenhaal
- The Invisible Man – 2020 – character of Adrian Griffin played by Oliver Jackson-Cohen

== Attention deficit hyperactivity disorder ==
- Juno – 2007 – character of Juno MacGuff, played by Elliot Page

== Avoidant personality disorder ==
- Finding Forrester – 2000 – character of William Forrester played by Sean Connery

== Bipolar disorder ==
- Misery – 1990 – character of Annie Wilkes played by Kathy Bates
- Michael Clayton – 2007 – character of Arthur Edens played by Tom Wilkinson
- 3 – 2012 – character of Ram played by Dhanush
- Filth - 2013 - character of Bruce Robertson played by James McAvoy

== Borderline personality disorder ==
- Play Misty For Me – 1971 – character of Evelyn Draper played by Jessica Walter
- Mommie Dearest – 1981 – character of Joan Crawford played by Faye Dunaway
- Fatal Attraction – 1987 – character of Alex Forrest played by Glenn Close
- Basic Instinct – 1992 – character of Catherine Tramell played by Sharon Stone
- Single White Female – 1992 – character of Hedra Carlson/Ellen Besch played by Jennifer Jason Leigh
- The Crush – 1993 – character of Adrian Forrester played by Alicia Silverstone
- Falling Down – 1993 – character of William "D-Fens" Foster played by Michael Douglas
- Mad Love – 1995 – character of Casey Roberts played by Drew Barrymore
- Fear – 1996 – character of David McCall played by Mark Wahlberg
- Girl, Interrupted – 1999 – character of Susanna Kaysen played by Winona Ryder
- Thirteen – 2003 – characters of Evie and Tracy played by Nikki Reed and Evan Rachel Wood respectively.
- Eternal Sunshine of the Spotless Mind – 2004 – character of Clementine Kruczynski played by Kate Winslet
- Notes on a Scandal – 2006 – character of Barbara Covett played by Judi Dench
- Obsessed – 2009 – character of Lisa Sheridan played by Ali Larter
- Black Swan – 2010 – character of Nina Sayers played by Natalie Portman
- Silver Linings Playbook – 2012 – character of Tiffany Maxwell played by Jennifer Lawrence
- Filth - 2013 - character of Bruce Robertson played by James McAvoy
- Welcome to Me – 2014 – character of Alice Klieg played by Kristen Wiig

== Conversion disorder ==
- Tommy – 1975 – character of Tommy played by Roger Daltrey

== Dependent personality disorder ==
- What About Bob? – 1991 – character of Bob Wiley played by Bill Murray

== Dissociative identity disorder ==
- Manichitrathazhu – 1993 – character of Ganga played by Shobana
- Primal Fear – 1996 – character of Aaron Stampler (or Roy) played by Edward Norton
- Fight Club – 1999 – character of the unnamed narrator played by Edward Norton
- Split – 2016 – character of Kevin Wendell Crumb played James McAvoy

== Folie à deux (shared psychotic disorder) ==
- Dead Ringers – 1988 – characters of Beverly and Elliot Mantle played by Jeremy Irons
- Bug (2006) – characters of Agnes White played by Ashley Judd and Peter Evans played by Michael Shannon
- Joker: Folie à Deux – 2024 – characters of The Joker and Harley Quinn, played by Joaquin Phoenix and Lady Gaga

== Kleptomania ==
- De Dhakka (2008) – character of Dhana played by Siddhartha Jadhav.

== Narcissistic personality disorder ==
- Terms of Endearment – 1983 – character of Aurora Greenway played by Shirley MacLaine

== Obsessive–compulsive disorder ==
- Aham – 1992 – character of Sidharthan played by Mohanlal
- As Good as It Gets – 1997 – character of Melvin Udall played by Jack Nicholson
- Matchstick Men – 2003 – character of Roy Waller played by Nicolas Cage
- The Aviator – 2004 – character of Howard Hughes played by Leonardo DiCaprio
- North 24 Kaatham – 2013 – character of Harikrishnan played by Fahadh Faasil
- Nitham Oru Vaanam – 2022 – character played by Ashok Selvan

== Obsessive–compulsive personality disorder ==
- The Odd Couple – 1968 – character of Felix Ungar played by Jack Lemmon

== Paranoid personality disorder ==
- The Caine Mutiny – 1954 – character of Philip Francis Queeg played by Humphrey Bogart
- Falling Down – 1993 – character of William "D-Fens" Foster played by Michael Douglas

== Post-traumatic stress disorder ==
- The Perks of Being a Wallflower – 2012 – character of Charlie Kelmeckis played by Logan Lerman
- Iron Man 3 – 2013 – character of Tony Stark played by Robert Downey Jr.

== Psychosis ==
- Black Swan – 2010 – character of Nina Sayers / White Swan / Odette played by Natalie Portman
- They Look Like People – 2015 – character of Wyatt played by MacLeod Andrews

== Schizoaffective disorder ==
- Terminator 2: Judgment Day – 1991 – character of Sarah Connor played by Linda Hamilton

== Schizoid personality disorder ==
- The Remains of the Day – 1993 – character of Mr James Stevens played by Anthony Hopkins
- The Lord of the Rings: The Two Towers – 2002 – character of Gollum
- The Lord of the Rings: The Return of the King – 2003 – character of Gollum
- Lars and the Real Girl – 2007 – Lars Lindstrom
- The Hobbit: An Unexpected Journey – 2012 – character of Gollum

== Schizotypal personality disorder ==
- Taxi Driver – 1976 – character of Travis Bickle played by Robert De Niro
- Charlie and the Chocolate Factory – 2005 – character of Willy Wonka played by Johnny Depp

== Schizophrenia ==
- A Beautiful Mind – 2001 – character of John F. Nash played by Russell Crowe
- Donnie Darko – 2001 – character of Donnie Darko played by Jake Gyllenhaal
- The Voices – 2014 – character of Jerry Hickfang played by Ryan Reynolds
- Words on Bathroom Walls – 2020 – character of Adam Petrazelli played by Charlie Plummer

== Stuttering ==
- One Flew Over the Cuckoo's Nest – 1975 – character of Billy Bibbit played by Brad Dourif
- The King's Speech – 2010 – character of King George VI played by Colin Firth
- Golmaal 3 – 2010 – character of Laxman played by Shreyas Talpade
- It – 2017 – character of Bill Denbrough played by Jaeden Martell

== Substance use disorder ==
- Colossal – 2016 – character of Gloria played by Anne Hathaway
