= MacLeod Andrews =

American actor and audiobook narrator

MacLeod Andrews is an American actor and audiobook narrator. He has won 15 Earphone Awards and 2 Audie Awards, as well as acting awards.

== Personal life ==
Andrews was born and raised in Louisville, Kentucky and graduated from Middlebury College. He presently lives in Los Angeles with his wife and daughters.

Andrews is a member of Rising Phoenix Repertory, a theatre company based in New York City.

== Awards and honors ==
=== Awards ===
Year	Title	Author	Award	Result	Ref.
2009	The Spectacular Now (2008)	Tim Tharp	Earphone Award	Winner	
2010	Flash Burnout (2009)	L. K. Madigan	Earphone Award	Winner	
2011	Will Grayson, Will Grayson (2010)	John Green and David Levithan	Amazing Audiobooks for Young Adults	Top 10	
2011	Will Grayson, Will Grayson (2010)	John Green and David Levithan	Audie Award for Teen Title	Finalist	
2011	Will Grayson, Will Grayson (2010)	John Green and David Levithan	Odyssey Award	Honor	
2014	The Schernoff Discoveries	Gary Paulsen	Listen-Up Award	Finalist	
2013	Innocence (2013)	Dean Koontz	Earphone Award	Winner	
2013	Suspect (2013)	Robert Crais	Earphone Award	Winner	
2013	War of the Worlds: Global Dispatches (1996)	Kevin J. Anderson (editor)	Earphone Award	Winner	
2013	We Are America	Walter Dean Myers	Audie Award for Distinguished Achievement in Production	Finalist	
2013	We Are America	Walter Dean Myers	Audie Award for Children's Title	Finalist	
2013	Welcome To Bordertown	Holly Black and Ellen Kushner (editors)	Audie Award for Short Stories or Collections	Finalist	
2014	Fourth of July Creek (2014)	Smith Henderson	Earphone Award	Winner	
2014	Kill City Blues	Richard Kadrey	Audie Award for Fantasy	Finalist	
2014	Suspect	Robert Crais	Audie Award for Thriller or Suspense	Finalist	
2015	Echo (2015)	Pam Muñoz Ryan	Earphone Award	Winner	
2015	The Lost Key	Catherine Coulter and J. T. Ellison	Audie Award for Thriller or Suspense	Finalist	
2015	The Omnivore's Dilemma (Young Readers Ed.) (2009)	Michael Pollan	Earphone Award	Winner	
2015	The Sixteenth of June	Maya Lang	Audie Award for Multi-Voiced Performance	Finalist	
2015	They Look Like People (2015)		Nashville Film Festival Graveyard Shift Competition for Best Actor	Winner	
2015	Your Fathers, Where Are They? And the Prophets, Do They Live Forever? (2014)	Dave Eggers	Audie Award for Literary Fiction or Classics	Finalist	
2016	Echo (2015)	Pam Muñoz Ryan	Amazing Audiobooks for Young Adults	Top 10	
2016	Echo (2015)	Pam Muñoz Ryan	Audie Award for Middle Grade Title	Winner	
2016	Echo (2015)	Pam Muñoz Ryan	Odyssey Award	Honor	
2016	A Hundred Thousand Worlds (2016)	Bob Proehl	Earphone Award	Winner	
2016	The Legend of Sam Miracle (2016)	N. D. Wilson	Earphone Award	Winner	
2016	Sweetgirl (2016)	Travis Mulhauser	Earphone Award	Winner	
2017	Gemina	Amie Kaufman and Jay Kristoff	Amazing Audiobooks for Young Adults	Top 10	
2017	They Look Like People (2015)		iHorror Award for Best Actor: Horror Film	Nominee	
2018	Aces	Craig Alanson	Voice Actor Award for Audiobook Narration: Teens - Best Voiceover	Nominee	
2018	The Dinner Scene (2017)		Bonehead Award for Best Male Lead Actor in a Micro-Short Film	Nominee	
2018	Hope Nation (2018)	Rose Brock (editor)	Earphone Award	Winner	
2018	Loving Vs. Virginia	Patricia Hruby Powell	Audie Award for History or Biography	Winner	
2018	Waiting for Eden (2018)	Elliot Ackerman	Earphone Award	Winner	
2019	Charlotte's Web (1952)	E.B. White	Earphone Award	Winner	
2019	Freefall (2019)	Jessica Barry	Earphone Award	Winner	
2020	Freefall (2019)	Jessica Barry	Audie Award for Thriller or Suspense	Finalist	
2020	A Ghost Waits (2020)		Screamfest Jury Award for Best Actor	Winner	
2020	A Ghost Waits (2020)		The Total Film FrightFest Award for Best Picture	Winner	
2020	A Ghost Waits (2020)		The Total Film FrightFest Award for Best Actor	Winner	
2021	The Coordinate (2019)	Marc Jacobs	Voice Actor Award for Audiobook Narration: Teens - Best Voiceover	Nominee	
2021	A Ghost Waits (2020)		Nevermore Film Festival Jury Award for Best Actor	Winner	
2024	Dark Fall	Brian Andrews and Jeffrey Wilson	Audie Award for Faith-Based Fiction and Nonfiction	Winner	

=== "Best of" lists ===
Year	Title	Honor	Ref.
2010	The Spectacular Now (2008) by Tim Tharp	Amazing Audiobooks for Young Adults	
2010	Will Grayson, Will Grayson	AudioFile's Best Young Adult Title	
2011	Flash Burnout	AudioFile's Best Young Adult Title	
2012	Charlie Joe Jackson’s Guide to Not Reading by Tommy Greenwald	Amazing Audiobooks for Young Adults	
2012	We Are America	AudioFile's Best Children's Title	
2014	Charlie Joe Jackson's Guide to Summer Vacation by Tommy Greenwald	Notable Children's Recordings	
2015	The Alex Crow by Andrew Smith	Publishers Weekly's Best Children's/YA	
2016	Echo (2015) by Pam Muñoz Ryan	Notable Children's Recordings	
2016	Guy in Real Life by Steve Brezenoff	Amazing Audiobooks for Young Adults	
2016	Slasher Girls and Monster Boys by April Genevieve Tucholke	Amazing Audiobooks for Young Adults	
2017	Enigma	AudioFile's Best Romance Title	
2017	Loving vs. Virginia by Patricia Hruby Powell	Publishers Weekly's Best Children's/YA	
2017	Their Fractured Light by Amie Kaufman and Meagan Spooner	Amazing Audiobooks for Young Adults	
2018	Hope Nation	AudioFile's Best Young Adult Title	
2019	Charlotte's Web by E. B. White	AudioFile's Best Children & Family Listening Title	
2019	The Feather Thief by Kirk Wallace Johnson	American Library Association Listen List	
2022	Good Girl, Bad Blood	Amazing Audiobooks for Young Adults	

== Select bibliography ==
Year	Title	Author	ISBN
2010	Trapped	Jack Kilborn	ISBN 9781453806029
2011	The Next Always	Nora Roberts	ISBN 9780451235183
2012	David Starr, Space Ranger	Isaac Asimov	ISBN 9781400161423
2013	Release Me	Tahereh Mafi	ISBN 9780062085535
2020	The Departure (Animorphs)	K. A. Applegate	ISBN 9781338538700

== Filmography ==
Year	Title	Role(s)	Note
2007	Tuesday Morning	Actor: Jamie	
2010	Fear	Actor: Narrator	
2012	Found in Time	Actor: Chris	
2014	Hot Fail	Actor: Threesome Date	
2014	Exclamation Mark	Actor: Exclamation Mark	
2015	They Look Like People	Actor: Wyatt; Co-producer	
2016	Split	Actor: Stan / Satan	
2017	Brooklyn, Day	Actor: Peter	
2017	The Dinner Scene	Actor: David	
2018	Red Dead Redemption 2	Actor: The Local Pedestrian Population	
2019	Doctor Sleep	Actor: Roger Macassi	
2019	The Siren	Actor: Al; Executive producer	
2019	They're Inside	Actor: Voice of the Man	
2020	A Ghost Waits	Actor: Jack; Producer; Writer	
2021	Black Box	Actor: Soldier / Beamis / Radio Announcer	5 episodes: Airborne; Reactor; Alvin; 1980; Message
2021	When I Consume You	Actor: David Castille; Producer	
2023-2024	Batwheels	Oliver Queen / Green Arrow, Announcer (voices)	3 episodes
2026	Yakuza Kiwami 3 & Dark Ties	Shoyo Toma, additional voices	Video game
