= When I Consume You =

2021 American horror film

- Film poster
- Directed by: Perry Blackshear
- Written by: Perry Blackshear
- Produced by: Perry Blackshear; MacLeod Andrews; Evan Dumouchel; Libby Ewing
- Starring: Libby Ewing; Evan Dumouchel; MacLeod Andrews; Margaret Ying Drake
- Cinematography: Perry Blackshear
- Edited by: Perry Blackshear
- Production companies: Ahab and the Dark
- Release date: August 18, 2021 (Fantasia International Film Festival)
- Running time: 92 minutes
- Country: United States
- Language: English

When I Consume You is a 2021 independent psychological horror film written and produced by Perry Blackshear, starring Libby Ewing, Evan Dumouchel, and MacLeod Andrews.

== Plot ==
Daphne and Wilson Shaw are siblings living together in a gritty area of Brooklyn. Both are trying to reshape their lives, having suffered from a traumatic and abusive childhood. After five years of staying sober, Daphne feels stable enough and wants to adopt a child. Conversely, Wilson struggles with deep anxiety as he tries to continue with his job as a schoolteacher. One day, Daphne reveals that she is being stalked by a stranger. As Wilson attempts to protect her while fighting his mental health issues, he finds his sister dead, having been murdered by her stalker. Wilson, fueled by anger and depression, wants to capture the killer himself, only to see Daphne's ghost warning him that the stalker is not human and that it is a supernatural entity feeding from people's desperations.

== Cast ==
- Libby Ewing as Daphne Shaw
- Evan Dumouchel as Wilson Shaw
- MacLeod Andrews as David Castille
- Margaret Ying Drake as Anete

== Production and reception ==
The film is another work of the indie horror kind produced by Perry Blackshear. The cast consists of actors who usually work with Blackshear, including his college friends Dumouchel and Andrews. The cast had also starred together in the critically acclaimed 2015 film They Look Like People.

The film holds an approval rating of 89% on Rotten Tomatoes based on 27 reviews, with an average rating of 7.90/10. Metacritic lists When I Consume You under a score of 75 out of 100, indicating "generally favorable" reviews.

Matt Konopka of Killer Horror Critic praised the movie and Blackshear's approach of making horror "personal and moving," adding that When I Consume You resonates in the viewer "long after its end." Bobby LePire of Film Threat gave a favorable review too, praising Blackshear and saying that, although "not perfect," the movie is "ambitious and touching."
