= L. K. Madigan =

American young adult book author

L. K. Madigan was the pen name of Lisa Wolfson (1963-2011), American writer of young adult fiction. In a 2010 interview with The Oregonian, Wolfson said she used the name L. K. Madigan because she didn't want to scare off "that rare, elusive creature, the male reader."

== Biography ==
Wolfson was born in Portland, Oregon. When she was ten years old she moved to Los Angeles, California with her family. At the age of 28 Wolfson left her job working at Warner Bros. Records to move back to Portland. While in Portland, Wolfson worked for 16 years for an investment management firm.

Wolfson was married to Neil Wolfson for 22 years. She died on February 23, 2011, in Portland, of pancreatic cancer at the age of 47.

== Education ==
- California State University, Northridge
- University of Bradford (Yorkshire, England)

== Bibliography ==
=== Young adult ===
- Flash Burnout (2009)
- The Mermaid's Mirror (2010)
- Project: Boy Next Door (2013)

== Awards ==
- 2009: Chosen as a Flying Start author by Publishers Weekly.
- 2010: Flast Burnout received The William C. Morris YA Debut Award.
- 2010: Flast Burnout received an Earphone Award for the audiobook narrated by MacLeod Andrews.
