= John & Jen =

- Show poster
- Music: Andrew Lippa
- Lyrics: Tom Greenwald
- Book: Andrew Lippa; Tom Greenwald
- Productions: 1995 Off-Broadway; 2015 Off-Broadway; 2021 Off-West End

John & Jen (styled as john & jen) is a musical with music by Andrew Lippa, lyrics by Tom Greenwald, and a book by Lippa and Greenwald. It is a two-person show about the relationships first between a brother and sister, John and Jen, and then, after John is killed, between Jen and her son, also named John. The musical opened Off-Broadway in 1995 and was revived Off-Broadway in 2015.

== Productions ==
John & Jen premiered at the Goodspeed Opera House, East Haddam, Connecticut in 1993. Directed by Gabriel Barre, the cast featured Carolee Carmello and James Ludwig.

The musical ran off-Broadway at the Lamb's Theatre from June 1, 1995, to October 1, 1995. It starred Carolee Carmello as Jen and James Ludwig as John, with direction by Gabriel Barre.

The show's twentieth anniversary off-Broadway revival opened in previews at the Clurman Theatre in Theatre Row on February 10, 2015, with the official opening on February 26. The revival, presented by Keen Company, starred Kate Baldwin and Conor Ryan. The revival closed on April 4, 2015.

The Southwark Playhouse in London hosted the world premiere of a new, updated version of John & Jen spanning 1985 - 2022 from 28th July - 21st August 2021, starring Olivier Award nominee Rachel Tucker and Lewis Cornay. This new production was directed by Guy Retallack and produced by Bray Productions.

== Synopsis ==
Act I (1952–1972)

Six-year-old Jen Tracy welcomes her newborn brother John into the world, with a warning about the way things work and a promise to protect him from Dad. ("Welcome to the World") As they grow, Jen does her best to shield John from life's disappointments, including a painful Christmas Eve fight between their parents. Not long after John's seventh birthday, Jen discovers a bruise on his face. "It was my fault," he tells her, "I broke a glass." Jen vows that Dad will never hurt John again, and she and John make a deal to always be there for each other. ("Think Big") As the pair grows older, sibling rivalry crops up when John is forced to attend Jen's high school basketball finals. ("Dear God") But when it's time for Jen to go off to college, John begs her not to leave him alone. ("Hold Down the Fort") Jen is determined to break free, however, deal or no deal. "I can't hold your hand forever," she tells John. "Grow up".

Jen embraces the world of the '60s in groovy New York City, where she blossoms into a drug-experimenting hippie while John's life goes in the opposite direction. ("Timeline") Without Jen there to protect him, John falls under his father's influence and decides to join the Navy. ("It Took Me A While")

When Jen returns home from New York, she and John see how much they've changed and how far apart they've grown. ("Out of My Sight") Learning of Jen's plans to move to Canada with her draft-dodging boyfriend, John accuses her of rejecting everything he and Dad stand for, and they part in anger. ("Run and Hide") After John leaves, Jen unfurls an American flag, drapes it over a coffin, and we learn that John has been killed in Vietnam. "I'm sorry, little brother," she whispers as Act I ends. ("Epilogue")

Act II (1972–1990)

Now living in Canada, 26-year-old Jen is the mother of a newborn baby boy, whom she names John. ("Old Clothes") But this John is not the naïve child of the '50s his mother expects him to be. When Jen moves back to the United States, leaving her failed marriage behind, she prepares to spend Christmas alone with seven-year-old John. Her gift to her son is an old baseball glove, which she proudly tells him belonged to his uncle. But John rejects the gift, complaining, "I'll be the only kid in school with a crappy old glove!"

Jen gets her son to play his uncle's favourite sport, but her obnoxious behavior at games only succeeds in mortifying him. ("Little League") Visiting her brother's grave on what would have been his 32nd birthday, Jen remarks on the similarities between the two Johns and vows that she won't fail her son. ("Just Like You") But when it's time for the 12-year-old to go off to camp, Jen finds herself barely able to say goodbye. ("Bye Room")

In a montage spanning John's high school years, John and Jen take turns as mock talk show hosts covering topics that reveal Jen's growing dependence on her son and John's struggle for freedom. ("Talk Show") Later, when John discovers that his mother has hidden his acceptance packet from Columbia University, it becomes clear that Jen is terrified that she'll lose John "again," and she is no longer able to differentiate between her brother and her son. ("Smile of Your Dreams")

Finally realizing how desperately his mother needs him, John decides to forgo Columbia in favour of a local community college. Disturbed to see him throwing away his future on her account, Jen ridicules his decision. John is deeply hurt by his mother's reaction, and he bitterly mocks her influence on his life. ("Graduation") As their argument escalates, Jen slaps her son.

Shaken by the parallels to her abusive father, Jen retreats to her brother's grave, where she finally accepts that it's time to move on. ("The Road Ends Here") John joins his mother at the cemetery, where Jen asks his forgiveness. ("That Was My Way") Jen is finally able to let her son go, and they take their first steps into the world on their own. ("Every Goodbye is Hello")

== Songs ==
Act I – Jen and John (Brother)

- "Welcome to the World" – Jen
- "Think Big" – Jen and John
- "Dear God" – Jen and John
- "Hold Down the Fort" – Jen
- "Timeline" – Jen and John
- "It Took Me a While" – John
- "Out of My Sight" – Jen and John
- "Run and Hide" – Jen and John
- "Epilogue" – Jen and John

Act II – Jen and John (Son)

- "Old Clothes" – Jen
- "Little League" – Jen and John
- "Just Like You" – Jen
- "Bye Room" – John
- "Talk Show" – Jen and John
- "Smile of Your Dreams" – Jen
- "Graduation" – Jen and John
- "The Road Ends Here" – Jen
- "That Was My Way" – Jen
- "Every Goodbye is Hello" – Jen and John

== Recording ==
The original cast recording was released by Ghostlight Records in digital form in 2012.

A recording of the 2015 Off-Broadway Cast was released in June 2015.
