= Vikaari =

2020 Sri Lankan short film

- Directed by: Sandun Seneviratne
- Screenplay by: Sandun Seneviratne; Charlie Bray
- Produced by: Sandun Seneviratne; Charlie Bray
- Starring: Ashan Dias; Bimsara Premaratne; Richard Dee Roberts
- Release date: 15 October 2020 (LA Screamfest)
- Running time: 15 minutes
- Countries: Sri Lanka; UK
- Language: English

Vikaari (lit. 'Change') is a 2020 Sri Lankan science fiction horror drama short film written, directed and produced jointly by Sandun Seneviratne and Charlie Bray. It was predominantly shot in Sri Lanka and few portions were shot in the UK. The film premiered at the Los Angeles Screamfest Horror Film Festival on 15 October 2020, becoming the first film to be screened at the festival. It won the Best Short Film award at the festival.

== Synopsis ==
The film showcases the cultural and political depiction and crisis which was deepened and sparked by the physical appearances of the physically and mentally affected disabled infants in countries affected by civil war. The babies born in war torn nations were surprisingly talented with possessing supernatural powers.

== Cast ==
- Ashan Dias
- Bimsara Premaratne
- Richard Dee Roberts
