= Tommy Greenwald =

American writer

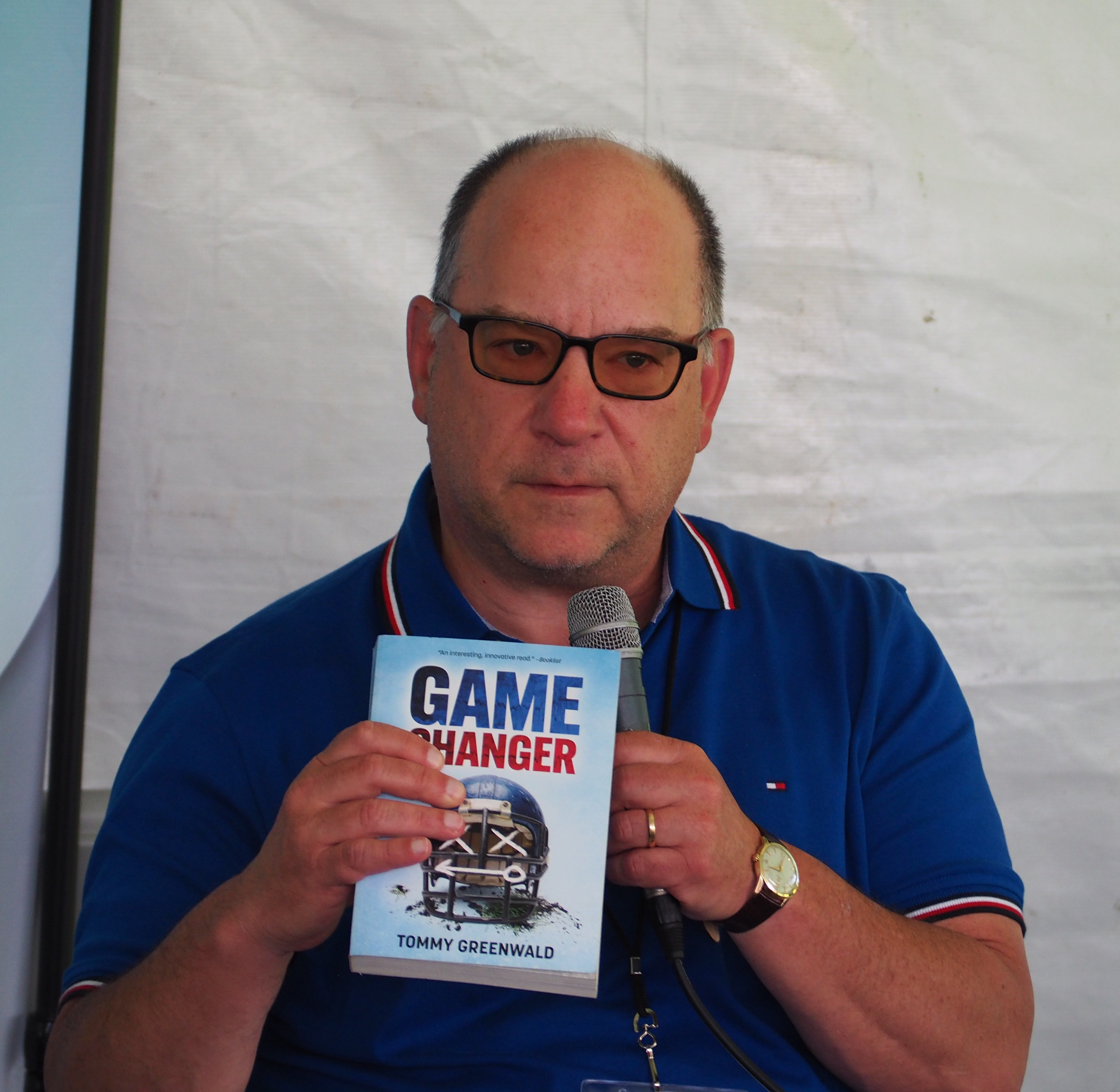
Greenwald in 2023

Tommy Greenwald (born April 27, 1962) is an American playwright and children’s book author. Greenwald co-wrote John & Jen with Andrew Lippa.

His debut middle-grade fiction book was Charlie Joe Jackson’s Guide to Not Reading, a humorous book about a reluctant reader.

He also wrote the lyrics for the musical John & Jen, which tells the story of a woman named Jen and two men in her life named John: her brother, who dies in the Vietnam War, and her son.

Greenwald is executive creative director of Spotco, which creates advertisements for Broadway shows.

== Bibliography ==
- Charlie Joe Jackson's Guide to Not Reading, Roaring Brook Press, 2011
- Charlie Joe Jackson's Guide to Extra Credit, Roaring Brook Press, 2012
- Charlie Joe Jackson's Guide to Summer Vacation, Roaring Brook Press, 2013
- Jack Strong Takes a Stand, Roaring Brook Press, 2013
- Charlie Joe Jackson's Guide to Making Money, Roaring Brook Press, 2014
- Katie Friedman Gives Up Texting! (And Lives to Tell About It), Roaring Brook Press, 2015
- Charlie Joe Jackson's Guide to Planet Girl, Roaring Book Press, 2015
- Charlie Joe Jacksons guide to not reading and getting good grades. 2021
- Club Donald Duck 1: Nieuwe vrienden
- Club Donald Duck 2: Jacht op het spook
- Club Donald Duck 3: Metro op hol
- Club Donald Duck Duck Scares 1
- Club Donald Duck Duck Scares 2
- Club Donald Duck Duck Scares 3
