= Nancy Linehan Charles =

American actress

Nancy Linehan Charles (born November 11, 1942) is an American character actress of film, television and theater. Charles was born in New York City. On screen since the 1990s, she has appeared in more than 70 films and television programs as well as stage productions. She is a Presbyterian.

Her son is actor Will Rothhaar.

== Filmography ==
=== Film ===
Year	Title	Role	Notes
1992	Bram Stoker's Dracula	Older Woman	
1993	Shadowhunter	Hattie Moore	
1997	The Nurse	Betty James	
1997	Trial and Error	Witness	
1998	Dead Man on Campus	Anatomy Professor	
2000	In the Light of the Moon	Eleanor	
2001	Diary of a Sex Addict	Sammy's mother	
2002	Minority Report	Celeste Burgess	
2005	Extreme Dating	Maggie	
2007	Charlie Wilson's War	Mrs. Long	
2009	The Stepfather	Mrs. Cutter	
2012	The Lords of Salem	Clovis Hales	
2017	The Hatred	Grandmother	
2018	American Psychopath	Dr. Eleanor Warner	
2019	Only Mine	Evelyn	
2019	Tone-Deaf	Agnes	
2019	3 from Hell	Dr. Bowman	
2020	The Way Back	Anne	
2021	The Manor	Annette	
2022	Gatlopp	Sheila	
2022	8 Found Dead	Patty	
2026	Coyote vs. Acme	Cherry	

=== Television ===
Year	Title	Role	Notes
1993	Bodies of Evidence	Mother #2	Episode: "Endangered Species"
1993	Step by Step	Woman	Episode: "Down and Out in Port Washington"
1993	Full House	Phyllis	Episode: "Support Your Local Parents"
1994	Sisters	Mother	Episode: "Poison"
1994	Murphy Brown	Sign-in Woman	Episode: "Humboldt IV: Judgment Day"
1994	Witch Hunt	Bea	Television film
1995	Diagnosis: Murder	Nurse Brackett	Episode: "How to Murder Your Lawyer"
1996	The John Larroquette Show	Carol	Episode: "Cosmetic Perjury"
1996	Sweet Temptation	Supervisor	Television film
1996	Space: Above and Beyond	Admiral Vetter	Episode: "Sugar Dirt"
1996	Norma Jean & Marilyn	Bette Davis	Television film
1996	Chicago Hope	Angela Trenkwada	Episode: "Divided Loyalty"
1997	Seinfeld	Woman Exec.	Episode: "The Comeback"
1997	The Jamie Foxx Show	Woman #1	Episode: "Dog Pounded"
1998	The Perfect Getaway	Thelma White	Television film
1998	Promised Land	Ida Gilger	Episode: "Undercover Granny"
1998	The Ransom of Red Chief	Temperance Lady 1	Television film
1999	Crusade	Villager	Episode: "Patterns of the Soul"
1999	Judging Amy	Lyle Warner	Episode: "Witch Hunt"
2000	18 Wheels of Justice	Becky Keeler	Episode: "Showdown"
2000	Profiler	Mrs. Baxter	Episode: "Clean Sweep"
2000	Family Law	Judge Rose Phillips	Episode: "A Mother's Son"
2000	ER	Glenda Walton	Episode: "Sand and Water"
2001	The Practice	Maryann Reynolds	Episode: "An Early Post"
2001	The Norm Show	Landlady	Episode: "Norm vs. Homelessness"
2001	Six Feet Under	Connie	2 episodes
2001	One on One	Miss Braxton	Episode: "School Dazed"
2001	Thieves	Loretta's Mom	Episode: "Liver Let Die"
2001	Any Day Now	Judge Mann	Episode: "Stay of Execution"
2001	Boston Public	Judge Counter	Episode: "Chapter Twenty-Six"
2002	The West Wing	Oncologist #1	Episode: "100,000 Airplanes"
2002	The Drew Carey Show	Judge Martin	Episode: "Look Mom, One Hand!"
2002	Touched by an Angel	Sally	Episode: "Two Sides to Every Angel"
2002	George Lopez	Mrs. Wilder	Episode: "The Show Dyslexic"
2002	Crossing Jordan	Court Judge	Episode: "Prisoner Exchange"
2003	Miracles	Barbara Harris	Episode: "The Letter"
2004	Century City	Attorney de la Habra	Episode: "To Know Her"
2004–2005	Huff	Lois	6 episodes
2005	24	Lucy Stiles	Episode: "Day 4: 3:00 p.m.-4:00 p.m."
2005	Blind Justice	Jill Berglass	Episode: "Leap of Faith"
2005	Ordinary Miracles	Claire	Television film
2005	Joey	Gloria	Episode: "Joey and the Musical"
2007	Close to Home	Harriet Kleffman	Episode: "Protégé"
2007	Love's Unfolding Dream	Virginia Stafford-Smith	Television film
2010	NCIS: Los Angeles	Jessica Haymes	Episode: "Callen, G"
2010	The Hard Times of RJ Berger	Mrs. Lipski	Episode: "Behind Enemy Lines"
2010–2012	Ave 43	Elspeth	16 episodes
2011	FutureStates	Ms. Franklin	Episode: "Worker Drone"
2012	Longmire	Mrs. Thompson	Episode: "Dog Soldier"
2014	Spooked	Me-Maw	Episode: "Mixed Signals"
2014	Getting On	Reverend Margaret	Episode: "Is Soap a Hazardous Substance?"
2014	Growing Up and Down	Mrs. Hampton	Television film
2015	Days of Our Lives	Megan	2 episodes
2015	Kevin from Work	Kevin	Episode: "Roommates from Work"
2015	Criminal Minds	Eileen Kebler	Episode: "Future Perfect"
2016	The Real O'Neals	Judge	Episode: "The Real Papaya"
2016	Bosch	Annette McKay	Episode: "Everybody Counts"
2016	Better Things	Diane	Episode: "Woman Is the Something of the Something"
2017	Grimm	Mrs. Stanton	Episode: "Blood Magic"
2017	Vice Principals	June Russell	Episode: "Think Change"
2018	Life in Pieces	June	Episode: "Goose Friends Auction Fog"
2018	My Dead Ex	Miss Matheson	Episode: "¿Quién Diablos es Ben Bloom?"
2018	Light as a Feather	Judith	3 episodes
2018–2022	Young Sheldon	Peg	17 episodes
2019	Shameless	Broom Hilda	Episode: "Los Diablos!"
2019	Into the Dark	Agnes	Episode: "Treehouse"
2020	The Rookie	Snowball's Owner	Episode: "The Overnight"
2021	NCIS	Ruthann Harrison	Episode: "Watchdog"
2021	The Conners	Hannah	Episode: "An Old Dog, New Tricks and a Ticket to Ride"
2022	9-1-1: Lone Star	Mrs. Engel	Episode: "The Bird"
2022	American Horror Stories	Ms. Hendricks	Episode: "Aura"
2022	Chicago Med	Elinor Whipple	Episode: "Yep, This Is the World We Live In"
2023	Call Me Kat	Patty	Episode: "Call Me Prescription Roulette"
2023	Station 19	Shirley	Episode: "We Build Than We Break"
2024	S.W.A.T.	Martha Ramos	Episode: "Last Call"
2026	The Pitt	Mrs. Randolph	Episode: "11:00 A.M."
