= A Ghost Waits =

- Directed by: Adam Stovall
- Screenplay by: MacLeod Andrews; Adam Stovall
- Story by: Adam Stovall; Matt Taylor
- Cinematography: Michael C. Potter
- Edited by: Adam Stovall
- Music by: Mitch Bain; Margaret Darling
- Production company: Rebecca Films
- Distributed by: Arrow Films
- Release date: March 6, 2020 (FrightFest)
- Running time: 80 minutes
- Country: United States
- Language: English

A Ghost Waits is a 2020 American romantic comedy horror film directed by Adam Stovall and starring MacLeod Andrews and Natalie Walker. It was written by Andrews and Stovall. The film, which is in black and white, centers upon a handyman who falls in love with a ghost. It was distributed by Arrow Films.

== Plot summary ==
Handyman Jack has been tasked with cleaning and inspecting houses for his clients, a property management company. His latest house has been an enigma to his employers, as no one has managed to remain in the house for very long and they want Jack to find out why. As he begins his task Jack is oblivious to the paranormal phenomena surrounding him, but eventually acknowledges the haunting. Jack and the spirit, Muriel, begin to strike up a friendship that eventually turns romantic.

== Cast ==
- MacLeod Andrews as Jack
- Natalie Walker as Muriel
- Sydney Vollmer as Rosie
- Amanda Miller as Ms Henry

== Production ==
Director Adam Stovall has stated that two of the main inspirations for A Ghost Waits were the 2014 video game P.T. and a strip from the webcomic Saturday Morning Breakfast Cereal. In the strip a woman says that the most American film is Ghostbusters, as "in it there's undeniable proof of an afterlife but the whole thing is about growing a small business and navigating bureaucracy", which Stovall found humorous. He began working on the script in January 2016 and by July of the same year, began filming. While editing the assembly cut Stovall noted that the first act needed to be stronger, so he and lead actor MacLeod Andrews flew to Cincinnati to determine what needed to be fixed before performing reshoots in February 2018.

A Ghost Waits was initially filmed in color per the recommendation of the unit production manager. Andrews suggested making the film black and white, a concept that Stovall had entertained early in the production process. Per Stovall, this made it easier for the footage to match up properly, as he was using material shot during different points in the production process and by two different people.

== Release ==
A Ghost Waits had its world premiere on March 6, 2020, at FrightFest Glasgow, followed by a North American premiere at Screamfest on October 13, 2020. On February 1, 2021, the film premiered on the digital streaming service Arrow.

== Reception ==
Critical reception for A Ghost Waits has been positive and the film holds a rating of 92% on Rotten Tomatoes, based on 26 reviews.

Some reviewers have drawn comparisons between the film and the 1988 film Beetlejuice, as A Ghost Waits has a "kind of afterlife bureaucracy in charge of hauntings".

Other elements of praise focused on the movie's characters and use of greyscale.

Kim Newman reviewed the movie favorably, stating "It’s rare for a screen character to express any satisfaction in doing a blue-collar job well, for instance, and this makes an interesting contrast with Girl on the Third Floor, in which the handyman is amateur and inept and provokes a female ghost to wrath rather than sympathy."

Flickering Myth gave the film three stars, writing that "Its storytelling inconsistencies accepted, this is an impressive effort given the resources".
