= Winter Williams =

American actress (born 1984)

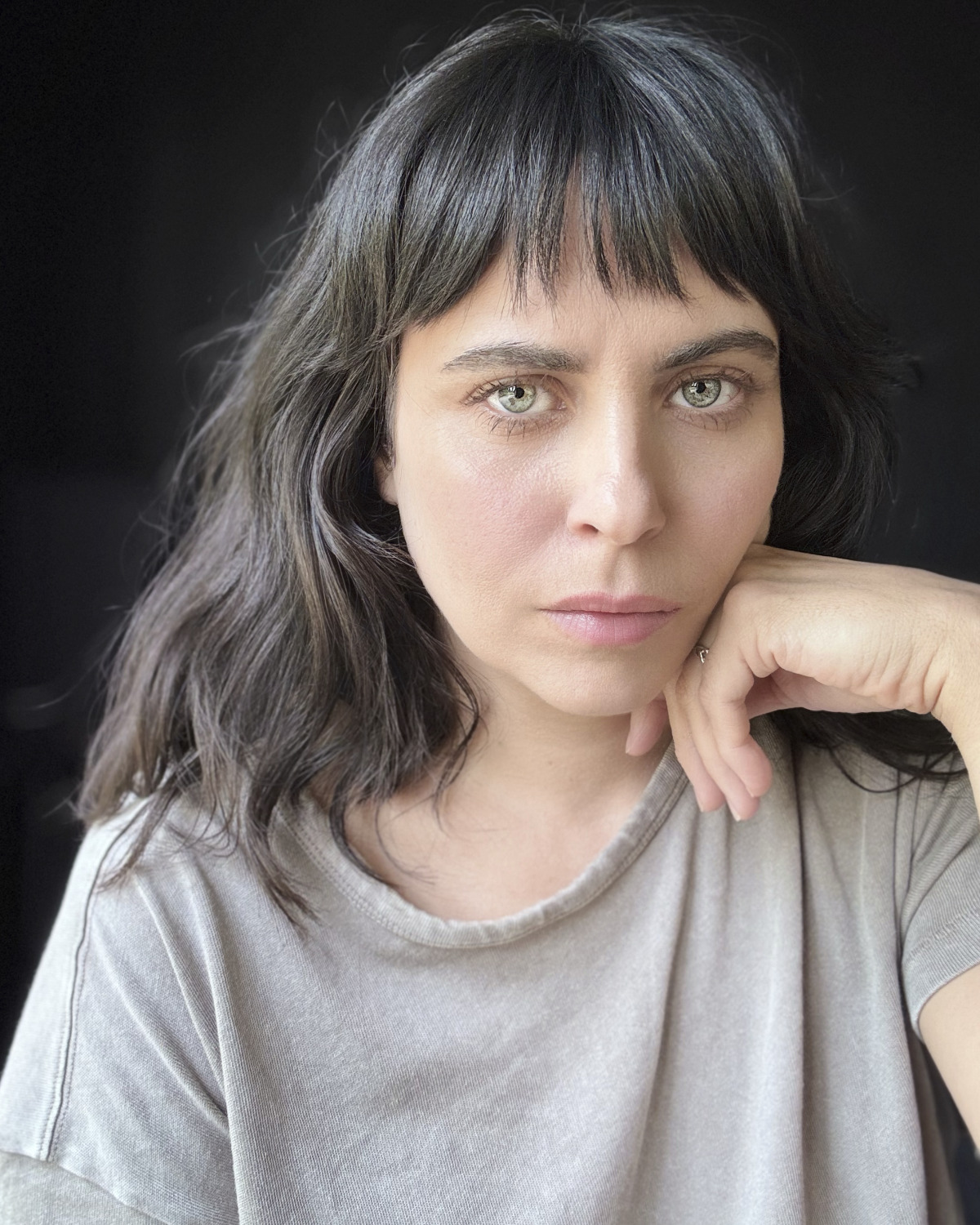
- Winter Williams in 2026
- Born: Ashley Christina Williams; January 24, 1984 (age 42); Boston, Massachusetts, U.S.
- Occupation: Actress
- Years active: 2009–present
- Spouse: Matthew A. Brown
- Children: 2

Ashley Christina Williams (born January 24, 1984) known professionally as Winter Williams, is an American actress. She is known for her roles in the horror films The Human Centipede (First Sequence) (2009) and Julia (2014).

== Early life ==
Ashley Christina Williams was born in Boston, Massachusetts. She graduated from the American Academy of Dramatic Arts in New York City in 2005, where she received the Charles Jehlenger Award for excellence in acting.

== Career ==
She is best known for her role as Lindsay in The Human Centipede (First Sequence), where she plays the middle member of the human centipede. Her next major role was Piper in the 2010 suspense drama, Empty. In 2014, she had the title role in the horror film Julia, as a rape victim pursuing revenge. She won the award of Best Actress at the 2014 Screamfest Horror Film Festival for her performance as Julia.

On March 23, 2023, she announced that, due to multiple other actors with the same or similar name, she had chosen "Winter Williams" as her new stage name. She noted "winter" was a word with special personal meaning to her. One of her first films to use this new credit is the forthcoming Winter Hymns.

== Personal life ==
Williams met her husband Matthew A. Brown on the set of Julia. The couple have two children together.

== Filmography ==
=== Film ===
Year	Film	Role	Notes
1988	Willow	Child Villager	Uncredited
2009	The Human Centipede (First Sequence)	Lindsay	main role
2010	Broken Crayons		associate producer
2011	Empty	Piper	main role
2013	Leaving Circadia	Jackie	supporting role
2013	A Guy Named Rick	Candace	supporting role
2014	Julia	Julia	main role
2014	Hallows Eve	Ashley	4th billing
2015	Patric	Ms. Rosen	supporting role
2015	Selene Hollow	Zombie Victoria	short; supporting role
2018	Albanian Gangster	Lisa	main role
2018	The Church	Elizabeth Haines	main role
2026	Winter Hymns	Eileen	upcoming

=== Television ===
Year	Title	Role	Notes
2012	Hells Kitty	Lindsay	episode 13
2013	Lady Business	Yasmine	episode 2
2013	Selene Hollow	Zombie Victoria	episodes 1-4

=== Theater ===
- Romeo and Juliet (as Juliet) directed by Dario D'Ambrosi at La MaMa Experimental Theatre Club
- 2010: Bong Bong Bong Against the Walls, Ting Ting Ting in Our Heads (as Loga) at La MaMa Experimental Theatre Club
- 2010: Spellbound - A Musical Adventure (as Herianne) at New York International Fringe Festival
- Under the Veil (as Sammia; a Mind The Art anthology) at La MaMa Experimental Theatre Club
- Much Ado About Nothing (as Beatrice) at Milagro Theater (New York City)
- The Diary of Anne Frank (as Anne Frank) with Four County Players
- The Grapes of Wrath (as Rose of Sharon) at Live Arts

== Awards and nominations ==
Year	Awards	Category	Nominated work	Result	Ref.
2014	Screamfest Horror Film Festival	Best Actress	Julia	Won	
