= Road to Fame =

- Theatrical release poster
- Directed by: Issa López
- Written by: Issa López
- Starring: Patricia Llaca; Julio Bracho; Ana Layevska; Diana Garcia; Daniela Schmidt; Maya Zapata
- Cinematography: Carlos Aguilera
- Edited by: Jorge García
- Music by: Hans Zimmer
- Production company: Columbia Pictures Producciones México
- Distributed by: Sony Pictures Releasing International
- Release date: 11 April 2008
- Running time: 1h 47min
- Country: Mexico
- Language: Spanish

Road to Fame (Spanish: Casi divas) is a 2008 Mexican comedy film directed by Issa López.

== Cast ==
- Patricia Llaca as Eva
- Julio Bracho as Alejandro
- Maya Zapata as Francisca
- Ana Layevska as Ximena
- Daniela Schmidt - Yesenia
- Diana Garcia as Catalina
- Mónica Huarte as Karen Trigo
- Darío T. Pie as Jurado
- Daniel Figueroa as Jonathan Armando
- Ianis Guerrero as Osiris
- Gustavo Sánchez Parra as Satán
- Uriel del Toro as Conductor
- Pedro Izquierdo as Adrián
- Adrián Alonso as Patricks
