= Draug (film) =

- Film poster
- Directed by: Klas Persson; Karin Engman
- Written by: Klas Persson
- Produced by: Karin Engman; Faravid Af Ugglas
- Starring: Thomas Hedengran; Elna Karlsson; Ralf Beck; Nina Filimoshkina; Urban Bergsten; Matti Boustedt
- Cinematography: Klas Persson
- Music by: Klas Persson
- Production company: Ödmården Filmproduction HB
- Release dates: October 10, 2018 (Screamfest Horror Film Festival); October 2, 2019 (United States)
- Running time: 88 minutes
- Country: Sweden
- Language: Swedish

Draug is a 2018 Swedish fantasy horror film taking place in the 11th century, at the end of the Viking Age.

== Plot ==
The film follows a royal rescue party to find a missing missionary in Hälsingland, one of the last pockets of pagan worship.

== Cast ==
- Thomas Hedengran as Kettil
- Elna Karlsson as Nanna
- Ralf Beck as Hakon
- Nina Filimoshkina as Deja
- Urban Bergsten as Gunder
- Matti Boustedt as Odd
- Oscar Skagerberg as Kol

== Production ==
A sizzle reel was published online in 2016. The film itself was produced independently in Bollnäs, Hälsingland, the same summer.

== Awards ==
The film premiered at the 2018 edition of Screamfest, where it was awarded prizes for best actor (Thomas Hedengran) and best music (Klas Persson).

== See also ==
- Category:Dark fantasy films
