= Julia (2014 film) =

Film by Matthew A. Brown

- Theatrical release poster
- Directed by: Matthew A. Brown
- Written by: Matthew A. Brown
- Produced by: Matthew A. Brown; Ty Walker
- Starring: Ashley C. Williams; Tahyna Tozzi; Jack Noseworthy
- Cinematography: Bergsteinn Björgúlfsson
- Edited by: Sverrir Kristjánsson
- Music by: Frank Hall
- Production companies: Farraj Factory; Kinetic Arts; Tycor International Film Company
- Distributed by: Archstone Distribution
- Release dates: July 19, 2014 (PiFan); October 23, 2015 (United States)
- Running time: 95 minutes
- Country: United States
- Language: English
- Box office: $3,616

Julia is a 2014 American neo-noir horror thriller film written and directed by Matthew A. Brown in his feature directorial debut. The film stars Ashley C. Williams as a woman who seeks revenge for her brutal rape. It had its world premiere at the Puchon International Fantastic Film Festival on July 19, 2014, and was given a limited theatrical release in the United States on October 23, 2015, by Archstone Distribution.

== Plot ==
Julia is a young woman who was drugged and raped by Pierce and three friends, then left for dead. She manages to make her way home, where she has spent most of her life being abused by various people and has turned to self-harm as a result.

Julia overhears someone discussing a therapy that lets rape victims take back power from their attackers. She's introduced to Dr. Sgundud through the mysterious Sadie. Under her guidance, Julia lures a man (implied to be a rapist of one of Sgrundud's past patients) to her apartment. Stripping naked, she seduces him and engages in sexual intercourse, but halfway through, the rest of the sisterhood restrain him, make Julia castrate him (taking his genitals as a trophy), stab him repeatedly, and dispose of his body. After several more hunts Julia sees one of her rapists, Adam, at the clinic where she works. She convinces him to assemble a meeting, claiming that the rape was the best thing that has ever happened to her.

On the night of the meeting, Julia drugs Adam and his two rapist friends, surgically removes Adam's eyes (as he did not actually rape her, but watched) and the other men's genitalia, then leaves for Pierce. However, she finds the sisterhood has already killed Pierce. Julia is knocked unconscious and taken back to Dr. Sgrundud after Sadie snitches on her. Sgrundud tells Julia that she has violated the rules of "taking medicine" and is about to be vivisected. He also reveals that the idea of emasculating victims came to him as he himself went through the procedure; his father performed it on him after discovering his homosexuality and crossdressing.

Before Sgrundud starts to operate on Julia, Sadie saves her and kills his associates. Sgrundud points his gun at Sadie, but Julia decapitates him from behind. Before Sadie can thank her friend, Julia shoots her in the head and leaves for an unknown future.

== Cast ==
- Ashley C. Williams as Julia
- Tahyna Tozzi as Sadie
- Jack Noseworthy as Dr. Sgundud
- Joel de la Fuente as Dr. Lin
- Cary Woodworth as Scott
- Darren Lipari as Matt
- Ryan Cooper as Pierce
- Brad Koed as Adam
- Sean Kleier as Tim
- Bridget Megan Clark as Yael Frankel
- Chris Cardona as Macho Corp. Executive
- Kumiko Konishi as Female Bartender
- James Henry B. as Pig F*ucker - Man

== Reception ==
On the review aggregator website Rotten Tomatoes, the film holds an approval rating of 57% based on 7 reviews, with an average rating of 5/10.

Ian Loring of Nerdly praised Julia, writing, "Julia is an evocative and engaging watch more from its uniquely cinematic stylings than through anything given in the narrative. While certainly not perfect, overall it is a decent entry in a genre which is troubling at the best of times and I certainly will be remembering writer/director Brown's name for the future." Grolsch Film Works also recommended the film, comparing it favorably to American Mary (2012). Flickering Myth gave a mixed review for Julia, commenting that the film was "a lot better than the I Spit on Your Grave remakes and it's a lot smarter than the original on which they were based, but it's also fairly forgettable."
