= 8 Found Dead =

- Directed by: Travis Greene
- Written by: Jonathan Buchanan
- Produced by: Jonathan Buchanan; Neil Evans; Nathaniel Upshaw; Ryan Valdez
- Starring: Aly Trasher; Alisha Soper; William Gabriel Grier; Eddy Acosta; Rosanne Limeres; Tim Simek; Nancy Linehan Charles
- Cinematography: Ryan Valdez
- Edited by: Rick Blakely; Neil Evans
- Production company: 8FD Film
- Distributed by: Dark Sky Films; MPI Media Group
- Release dates: October 17, 2022 (Screamfest LA); September 8, 2023 (U.S.)
- Running time: 83 minutes
- Country: United States
- Language: English

8 Found Dead is a 2022 American supernatural horror film directed by Travis Greene, starring Aly Trasher, Alisha Soper, William Gabriel Grier, Eddy Acosta, Rosanne Limeres, Tim Simek and Nancy Linehan Charles.

== Cast ==
- Aly Trasher as Carrie
- Alisha Soper as Sam
- William Gabriel Grier as Dwayne
- Eddy Acosta as Ricky
- Rosanne Limeres as Liz
- Tim Simek as Richard
- Nancy Linehan Charles as Patty
- Jenny Tran as Jessie
- Laura Buckles as Blake Miller
- Patrick Joseph Rieger as Bobby Miller

== Synopsis ==
Two couples plan a weekend getaway in the middle of the desert, only to discover that their Airbnb is already occupied.

== Release ==
The film was released to theatres and VOD on 8 September 2023.

== Reception ==
On Rotten Tomatoes it scored 71% from seven reviews.

Tyler Doupe' of Dread Central rated the film 3 stars out of 5 and wrote that while "not everything works", it is "ultimately an entertaining experience featuring two incredible unhinged performances from the central antagonists."

Joel Harley of Starburst rated the film 3 stars out of 5 and called it an "entertaining, if slightly bumpy, ride."

Leslie Felperin of The Guardian rated the film 2 stars out of 5 and wrote that "it is not hard to work out where this is going if you just do the maths."

== Possible sequel ==
The epilogue flashes back to thirty years previously with the words "to be continued".
