= The Laplace's Demon =

2017 Italian horror science fiction film

- Directed by: Giordano Giulivi
- Cinematography: Ferdinando D'Urbano
- Release date: 2017
- Country: Italy
- Language: Italian

The Laplace's Demon (Italian: Il demone di Laplace) is a 2017 Italian horror science fiction film directed by Giordano Giulivi. It premiered at the Fantasia International Film Festival in Montreal in 2017. The film is inspired by the causal determinism concept of the same name as formulated by Pierre-Simon Laplace and free will plays a central role in the plot. The Laplace's Demon relies heavily on rear-projection (rather than the today more common chroma key/green screen) to insert the actors into the environments.

== Reception ==
ComicsVerse was overall positive towards The Laplace's Demon and noted the distinct visual style but found the ending unsatisfying. RogerEbert.com called the film "mindblowing" and "delightful" and in his review for the website, film critic Brian Tallerico named it one of his two favorite films in his coverage of Fantasia that year. SciFiNow called the film "elegant" and pointed out its rigorous philosophy compared to other death trap movies such as Final Destination. Nightmare on Film Street compared it to an episode of The Twilight Zone while also noting the level of ambition for such a small production, mentioning Pi and Primer, two other low-budget films driven by intellectual ideas and where the director handled many parts of the production.
