= Issa López =

Mexican filmmaker

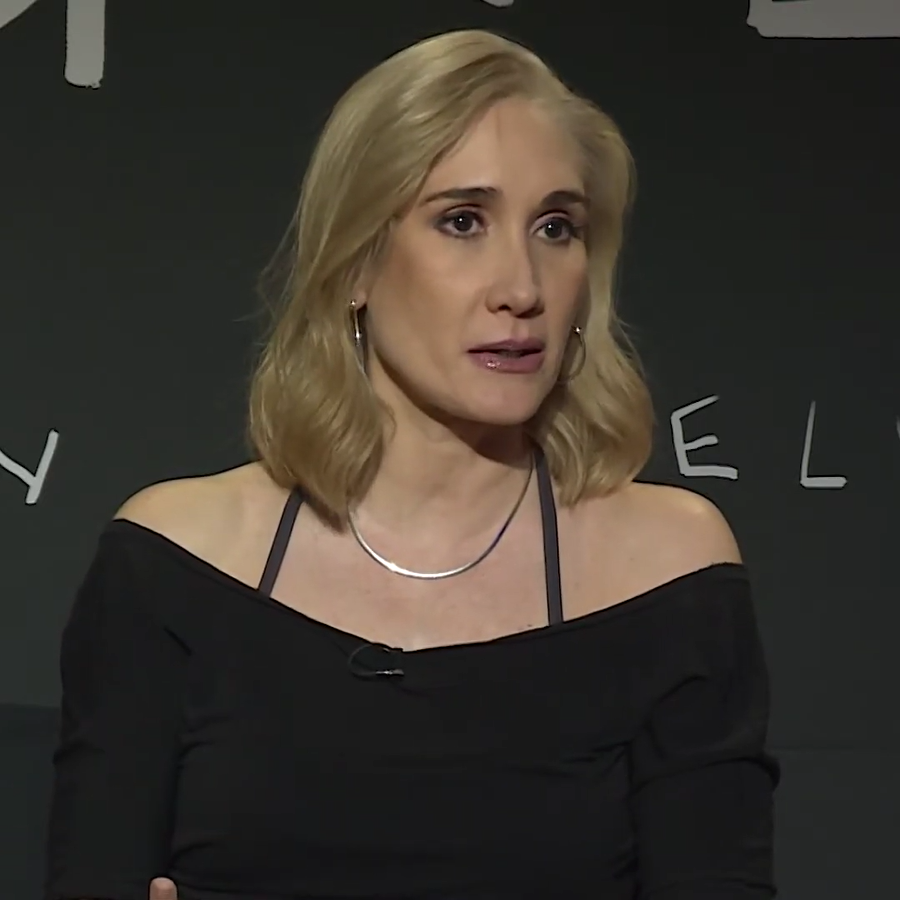
- López in 2017
- Born: 3 August 1971 (age 55); Mexico City, Mexico
- Education: National School of Film Arts (BA)
- Occupations: Film director; screenwriter; writer; producer
- Years active: 1994–present

Issa López (born 3 August 1971) is a Mexican director, writer and producer. Twelve Spanish language features have been produced from her original scripts, four of them directed by herself.

In 2017, López's film Tigers Are Not Afraid (Vuelven in Spanish) premiered at Fantastic Fest, where it won the Best Horror Director Award. The film also won numerous accolades internationally and in Mexico, including three Diosas de Plata and two Ariel Awards.

In 2024, Lopez directed and co-wrote True Detective: Night Country, the fourth installment of HBO's True Detective series.

López has won several literary awards, including the National Novel Award granted by Mexico's Institute of Fine Arts and Literature in 2007.

== Early life ==
Issa López was born in Mexico City, where she was raised by her father after her mother died when she was eight years old. She was not allowed to attend her mother's funeral due to the adults in her life believing it would be too traumatic for her, which has left López with a melancholy lack of closure that would be used in her later, more serious works. Her father was a semiotics academic and a college professor. During her childhood her family faced economic hardships, since academia is not a high-paying field in Latin America. This was a defining aspect of her life, inspiring much of her later work, since her dad would try to keep her and her sister entertained in spite of their economic situation. López explained in one of her interviews that she, her sister and her dad would "go every weekend on some road trip through Mexico, from small town to small town, sitting to watch kung fu and horror movies in traveling cinemas, eating street food, visiting archeological sites, jungles, deserts and the most haunted little towns in the country". Those memories were the inspiration for many of her stories. López's father, due to the death of her mother, also frequently hired nannies to take care of her and her sister, who would frequently tell them stories about the supernatural and witches, planting the seeds for López's future interest in horror. She also spent a lot of her early youth reading horror comics and literature which later developed into an interest in horror films too, inspiring her later works in her film career. López that she has been particularly drawn to this genre due to how they use horror as a tool to highlight flaws in society. At age 16, López would write a short story about a boy attempting to join a gang of boys that wouldn't accept him. While this story that went unfinished and unpublished, López would use this story later in life as part of the basis for her film, Tigers Are Not Afraid.

== Life and career ==
Issa López studied archeology for about two years, until "the pull of cinema was too strong to resist". She abandoned archeology and enrolled in Mexico's National University Filmschool, where she obtained a BA in Film Directing and Screenwriting. After her BA, she completed a two-year graduate program for dramatic writing. López began co-writing telenovelas and TV shows at Televisa. In 2003, she wrote the film Ladies' Night which was a box-office success, becoming the 5th biggest grossing Mexican film of 2003 and 2004.

López has won several literary awards, including the National Novel Award granted by Mexico's Institute of Fine Arts and Literature. In addition to her literary work, she penned multiple TV shows, some of them reaching the highest audience ratings in Mexican prime-time TV, and wrote the scripts for several film features, three of them produced in Mexico by the Major Hollywood Studios, and two of those directed by herself; Efectos Secundarios (Warner Bros., 2006) and Casi Divas (Sony Pictures, 2008). In 2015, López shot her third feature as a director, and tenth as a writer, Tigers Are Not Afraid. In March 2018, Todo Mal, her fourth feature film as a director, 11th as a writer, opened in Mexico.

In 2005, López was selected as one of the 50 Latino Impact Players in Entertainment, by Variety.

In 2006, López would make her director debut with the release of the film Efectos Secundarios, a Mexican comedy film about four school friends reuniting at an alumni party, focusing on their midlife struggles. This would be the first film that López directed along with writing the film as well.

In Mexico, López' movies have ranked among the highest grossing local productions: Ladies' Night (Disney, 2003) ranked fifth, Niñas Mal (Sony Pictures, 2007) seventh, and Efectos Secundarios fifteenth. Casi Divas opened in first place in the box office and went on to a limited theatrical run in the U.S. Casi Divas received enthusiastic reviews from Variety, The Hollywood Reporter, and the Los Angeles Times, among others. The film is the only Mexican movie to be scored by acclaimed Hollywood composer Hans Zimmer, who only charged $1 for his extensive work on the film.

In 2009, López would move to the US to work on a film with Joe Roth and Sony Pictures, however the project would fall through and never be completed. The cancellation of the project would lead López to begin working on a project that would become Tigers Are Not Afraid (Vuelven in Spanish), along with several other recent hardships in her life, such as the death of her father.

In 2015, 600 Millas, a film with a script co-written by López, was nominated for the Mexican Film Academy Ariel Award for Best Script.

In September 2017, after being rejected from several film festivals like Sundance,Tigers Are Not Afraid (Vuelven) Premiered at Fantastic Fest, in Austin Texas, and received the Best Horror Director Award. Issa López directed, wrote, and was executive producer of the film. In interviews, López cited that the inspiration for Tigers Are Not Afraid, came from long history of violence, especially in the modern day with how close people are to death. She also cited the death of her mother at an early age and her struggle of coming to terms with it, as an inspiration, using this trauma as the internal conflict for the protagonist, Estrella, who is haunted by the ghost of her mother after she had been murdered by gang members. For Tigers Are Not Afraid, López won Best Picture and Best Director at the 47th Diosas de Plata and the film received 10 nominations at the 60th Ariel Awards, among them Best Director and Best Original Screenplay for López, in 2018. It also got a Best Latin American Director Award in 2019 from NALIP (National Association of Latino Producers) and Fangoria Magazine, specialised in Horror Cinema, awarded it Best Foreign Language Movie in 2020. The film earned multiple positive reviews by major trades and critics, and a rating of 97% on Rotten Tomatoes.

Currently, López is working with Guillermo del Toro, who announced that he'd produce López's next film, a haunted western about the werewolf mythology. Searchlight Pictures signed her to write and direct The Book of Souls, to be produced by Noah Hawley, and Blumhouse is developing Our Lady of Tears, written and directed by López. She also wrote, produced and directed the fourth season of cult HBO series True Detective. For her work on the series, López received three Primetime Emmy nominations at the 2024 ceremony. She is set to develop a fifth season after the fourth received critical acclaim and the series’ best ratings for HBO. The fifth season of True Detective, set in the Jamaica Bay area of New York City, is scheduled to begin filming in 2025 with a scheduled release in 2027.

== Filmography ==
Short film

Year	Title	Director	Writer
1994	Tan callando	Yes	Yes
1994	Quimera	Yes	Yes
2010	Sucedió en un día	Yes	Yes

Television

Year	Title	Director	Writer	Producer	Notes
1997	Plaza Sésamo	Yes	Yes	No	Director for 1 Episode, Writer for 3 Episodes
1999	Laberintos de pasión	No	Yes	No	Writer for 80 Episodes
2000	Primer amor... a mil por hora	No	Yes	No	Telenovela
2019	Britannia	Yes	No	No	Director for 2 Episodes
2024	True Detective	Yes	Yes	Yes	Season 4

Feature film

Year	Title	Director	Writer	Producer
2003	Ladies' Night	No	Yes	No
2006	Efectos secundarios	Yes	Yes	Associate
2007	Bad Girls	No	Yes	No
2008	Road to Fame	Yes	Yes	No
2012	Viaje de Generación	No	Yes	No
2013	Pulling Stings	No	Yes	No
2015	600 Miles	No	Yes	No
2015	A la mala	No	Yes	No
2017	Tigers Are Not Afraid	Yes	Yes	Executive
2018	La Boda de Valentina	No	Yes	Executive
2018	Todo Mal	Yes	Yes	Yes
2024	Noches De Bodas	No	Yes	No

== Awards ==
Fiction Writer awards

- Mexico's National Institute of Fine Arts Novel Award, 2007.
- Efraín Huerta Short Story Award, 1995.
- Punto de Partida Short Story Award, 1995
- Alica Short Story Award, 1994.
- Finalist, Ricardo Pozas Short Story Award, 1996.
- Finalist, Efren Hernández Short Story Award, 1994.
- Finalist, New Writers Plaza y Valdes Award, 1992.

Movie awards

- Winner: Cyprus International Film Festival Best screenplay Award, Ladies' night, 2003
- Winner: Diosa de Plata award for Best Screenplay Award, Efectos Secundarios. 2007.
- Winner: Best Screenplay at the Los Angeles Latino International Film Festival, Casi Divas, 2009.
- Nominated: Mexican Film Academy Ariel Award, Best Screenplay 600 Millas 2016
- Winner: Fantastic Fest Best Horror Director Award: Issa López, Tigers Are Not Afraid 2017
- Winner: Screamfest, Los Angeles, CA: Best Actress: Paola Lara, Tigers Are Not Afraid. 2017
- Winner: Screamfest, Best Actor: José Ramón López, Tigers Are Not Afraid 2017
- Winner: Screamfest, Best Editing: Joaquim Martí, Tigers Are Not Afraid 2017
- Winner: Screamfest, Best Director: Issa López, Tigers Are Not Afraid 2017
- Winner: Screamfest, Best Picture: Tigers Are Not Afraid. 2017
- Winner: Dedfest, Alberta, Canada: Audience Award for Best Picture: Tigers Are Not Afraid. 2017
- Winner: Mórbido Fest, Mexico City, Mexico: Press Award: Tigers Are Not Afraid. 2017
- Winner: Mórbido Fest, Best Latin-American Picture: Tigers Are Not Afraid. 2017
- Winner: Ithaca Fantastik, NY: Audience Award, Best Pur Film: Tigers Are Not Afraid. 2017
- Winner: Paris International Fantastic Film Festival: L'Oeil D'Or, Audience Best Picture Award: Tigers Are Not Afraid. 2017
- Winner: Paris International Fantastic Film Festival: Cinema+ Frisson Best Picture Award: Tigers Are Not Afraid. 2017
- Winner: NOXFILMEST, El Salto, Uruguay: Best Feature, Jury Award: Tigers Are Not Afraid. 2018
- Winner: Panic Fest, Kansas City, Best Feature, Jury Award: Tigers Are Not Afraid. 2018
- Winner: Lost Weekend, Austin, TX: Best Script: Tigers Are Not Afraid. 2018.
- Winner: Lost Weekend, Austin, TX: Best Director: Tigers Are Not Afraid 2018
- Winner: Boston Underground Film Fest: Best Feature, Audience Award: Tigers Are Not Afraid. 2018
- Winner: Chattanooga Film Festival: Best Feature Award: Tigers Are Not Afraid. 2018
- Winner: Chicago Latino Film Festival: Best Feature, Audience Award:Tigers Are Not Afraid. 2018
- Winner: Brussels International Fantastic Film Festival, Silver Raven Award (Jury Award, 2nd Place). Tigers Are Not Afraid. 2018
- Winner: Brussels International Fantastic Film Festival, Best Feature, Audience Award: Tigers Are Not Afraid. 2018
- Winner: Imagine International Fantastic Film Festival, Amsterdam: Black Tulip (Jury Award): Tigers Are Not Afraid. 2018
- Winner: Calgary Underground Film Festival: Best Feature, Audience Award:Tigers Are Not Afraid. 2018
- Winner: Diosa de Plata, Mexico Film Critics Association Award: Best Child Actor, Paola Lara, Tigers Are Not Afraid. 2018
- Winner: Diosa de Plata, Mexico Film Critics Association Award: Best Director, Issa López. Tigers Are Not Afraid. 2018
- Winner: Diosa de Plata, Mexico Film Critics Association Award: Best Picture, Tigers Are Not Afraid. 2018
- Nominated: Mexican Film Academy Ariel Award, Best Screen Play, Tigers Are Not Afraid. 2018
- Nominated: Mexican Film Academy Ariel Award, Best Director, Issa López, Tigers Are Not Afraid. 2018.
- Winner: Calgary Underground Film Festival: Best Feature (Audience Award), Tigers Are Not Afraid. 2018.
- Winner: Hola Mexico Film Festival, Los Angeles: Best Director, Issa López, Tigers Are Not Afraid. 2018.
- Winner: Hola Mexico Film Festival, Los Angeles: Best Feature (Audience Award), Tigers Are Not Afraid. 2018.
- Winner: Fant Bilbao, Spain: Best Script, Tigers Are Not Afraid. 2018.
- Winner: Fant Bilbao, Spain: Best Feature (Audience Award) Tigers Are Not Afraid' 2018.
- Winner: BIFAN, South Korea: Best Director, Issa López, Tigers Are Not Afraid. 2018.
- Winner: Popcorn Frights, Florida: Best Feature (Jury Award), Tigers Are Not Afraid. 2018.
- Winner: Grimmfest, Manchester: Best Feature (Jury Award), Tigers Are Not Afraid. 2018.
- Winner: Grimmfest, Manchester: Best Feature (Audience Award), Tigers Are Not Afraid. 2018.
- Winner: Grimmfest, Manchester: Best Script, Tigers Are Not Afraid. 2018.
- Winner: Lund Fantastic Film Festival, Sweden: Best Feature (Audience Award) Tigers Are Not Afraid, 2018.
- Winner: Celluloid Screams, Sheffield UK: Best Movie (Audience Award) Tigers Are Not Afraid. 2018.
- Winner: Nocturna Festival, Madrid: Dark Visions Best Feature (Jury Award) Tigers Are Not Afraid. 2018.
- Winner: Toronto After Dark: Best Screenplay Tigers Are Not Afraid 2018.
- Winner: Toronto After Dark: Best Director, Issa López, Tigers Are Not Afraid. 2018.
- Winner: Toronto After Dark: Most Original Film,Tigers Are Not Afraid. 2018.
- Winner: Toronto After Dark: Best Feature Silver Award, Tigers Are Not Afraid. 2018.
- Winner: Cine Mexico Now, Detroit: Best Feature (Audience Award), Tigers Are Not Afraid. 2018.
- Winner: Terror Molins, Catalonia: Best Director, Issa López, Tigers Are Not Afraid. 2018.
- Winner: Terror Molins, Catalonia: Best Feature Critics Golden Award, Tigers Are Not Afraid. 2018.
- Winner: Saskatoon Fantastic Film Festival, Canada: Best Horror Feature (Audience Award, Gold), Tigers Are Not Afraid. 2018.
- Winner: Buenos Aires Rojo Sangre, Argentina: Best Feature, Tigers Are Not Afraid. 2018
- Winner: Buenos Aires Rojo Sangre, Argentina: Best Script, Issa López, Tigers Are Not Afraid. 2018.
- Nominated: Latino Entertainment Journalists Association, Best Original Screenplay, Issa López, Tigers Are Not Afraid, 2020
- Winner: NALIP (National Association of Latino Independent Producers) Best Latin American Director, Issa López, Tigers Are Not Afraid, 2019
- Winner: Fangoria Chainsaw Award, Best Foreign Language Movie, Tigers Are Not Afraid. 2020.

TV Show Awards

- Nominee: Primetime Emmy Awards, Outstanding Limited or Anthology Series, True Detective. 2024
- Nominee: Primetime Emmy Awards, Outstanding Writing for a Limited or Anthology Series or Movie, True Detective. 2024
- Nominee: Primetime Emmy Awards, Outstanding Directing for a Limited or Anthology Series or Movie, True Detective. 2024
- Winner: Imagen Foundation Award, Best Director-Television. 2024
- Nominee: Directors Guild of America, USA, Outstanding Directorial Achievement in Dramatic Series, True Detective. 2025
- Winner: Writers Guild of America, USA, Limited Series, True Detective. 2025
- Winner: Gracie Allen Awards, Writer Scripted-Drama, True Detective. 2025
