= Andrew Lippa =

American composer

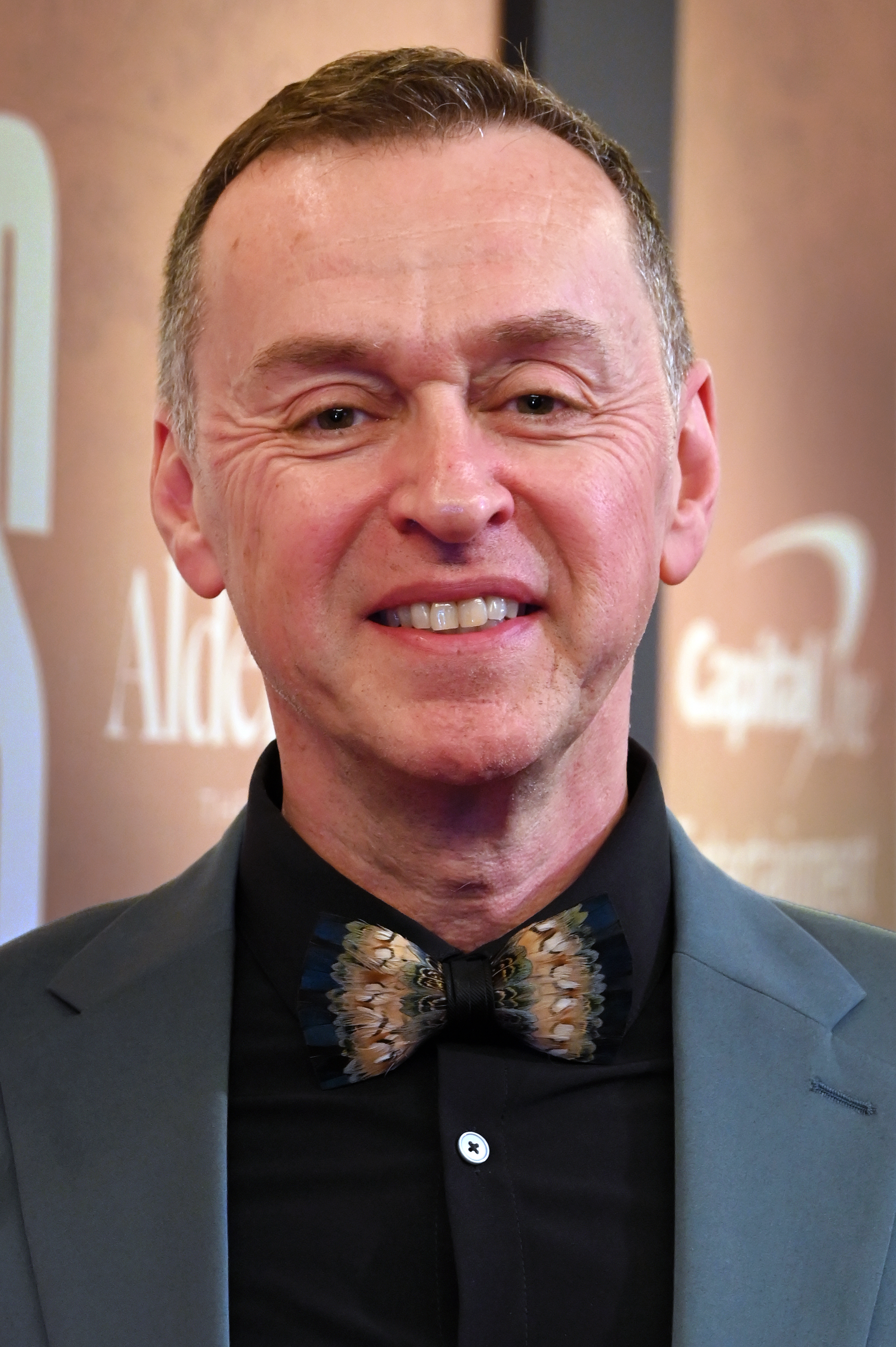
- Lippa in 2025
- Born: December 22, 1964 (age 61); Leeds, England
- Education: University of Michigan
- Occupations: Composer; lyricist; libretto writer
- Spouse: David Bloch (married 2008, divorced 2019) Tom Regouski (married 2022)
- Website: andrewlippa.com

Andrew Lippa (born December 22, 1964) is an American composer, lyricist, book writer, performer, and producer. He is a resident artist at the Ars Nova Theater in New York City.

== Early life ==
Lippa was born in Leeds, England, to English parents. He emigrated to the United States in October 1967 and grew up in Oak Park, Michigan, a suburb of Detroit. Lippa attended Oak Park High School and later the University of Michigan, where he studied vocal performance but eventually transferred into music education and received his bachelor's degree in music education. After graduating from college, Lippa moved to New York City in 1987 and became a middle school music teacher at Columbia Grammar and Prep School (CGPS) on the Upper West Side. He was promoted his second year at CGPS to dean of 7th and 8th grade students – an assistant principal position – and held that post, in addition to teaching music, until June 1991. In 1988 Lippa was accepted into the celebrated BMI Lehman Engel Musical Theatre Workshop as a composer. There he met his future collaborator Tom Greenwald (John & Jen). He later pursued a career in musical composition.

== Musical theatre career ==
Lippa began his professional theatrical career at the Goodspeed Opera House in East Haddam, Connecticut. He was hired in early 1992 to be the pianist for a production of It's a Bird... It's a Plane... It's Superman but quickly rose to become the dance arranger and assistant music director. He then stayed on for the remainder of the season in that capacity. Following the Goodspeed, Lippa worked at various theatres as music director and/or pianist in addition to being an increasingly in-demand arranger.

The Goodspeed produced Lippa’s first musical, John & Jen (book by Tom Greenwald), in 1993 at the Norma Terris Theatre in Chester, Connecticut. That production was followed by a workshop production the following year at the Berkshire Theatre Festival and, ultimately, a nearly 6-month run at Lamb's Theatre in New York City. The show was produced by Carolyn Rossi Copeland.

Lippa then went on to write the book, music, and lyrics for The Wild Party. He began work in 1996, and the Manhattan Theatre Club presented a reading of the first act later that year. Julia Murney, who later played the lead role of Queenie, was in the ensemble of that reading. The Wild Party had a two-week development at the Eugene O'Neill Theater Center in Connecticut in the summer of 1997. Following that period, producers Jeffrey Seller and Kevin McCollum optioned the play and, with the Manhattan Theater Club, made plans for production. The Wild Party was given its world premiere in 2000 at the Off-Broadway Manhattan Theatre Club in New York City. The Wild Party won the Outer Critics Circle Award for best Off-Broadway musical of the season, and Lippa won the 2000 Drama Desk Award for best music. The show was nominated for 13 Drama Desk Awards — the most of any show that year — including best new musical.

In 1999, Lippa contributed three new songs to the Broadway version of You're a Good Man, Charlie Brown and created all new arrangements. The three songs were "My New Philosophy" (to be sung by Kristin Chenoweth), “Beethoven Day”, and the new version of the title song. Lippa also produced the original cast recording and was honored with a Grammy Award nomination for his work on that recording.

In 2001, Lippa joined Brian Crawley to create a musical adaptation of A Little Princess. The show premiered in the summer of 2004 at TheatreWorks in Palo Alto, California. The recording was released on September 13, 2011, on Ghostlight Records. Texas State University's musical theatre department, under the direction of actress Kaitlin Hopkins, presented a revised version of the show in concert with Lippa conducting October 16–19. Following that production, Music Theatre International made the title available for license to theatres all over the world.

In 2006, the musical Asphalt Beach, with music and lyrics by Lippa and the book by T. C. Smith and Peter Spears, premiered at the American Music Theatre Project at Northwestern University. After producing Asphalt Beach, Stuart Oken asked Lippa to write the music and lyrics for The Addams Family (book by Marshall Brickman and Rick Elice). Lippa was honored with a Tony Award nomination (Best Original Score) and two Drama Desk nominations (Outstanding Music and Outstanding Lyrics) for his work on The Addams Family. The Addams Family starred Nathan Lane and Bebe Neuwirth, broke attendance records in Chicago during its 2009 try-out, and by its closing on December 31, 2011, had played 725 regular performances and 34 previews at the Lunt-Fontanne Theatre on Broadway. The US national tour began in New Orleans in September, 2011. International productions included São Paulo (March–December 2012), Sweden (September 2012–May 2013), and Sydney, Australia (March–June 2013). The Broadway cast recording was released on Decca Broadway, and vocal selections are available from Hal Leonard.

Lippa wrote the music and lyrics for Big Fish, a musical based on the 2003 film and the 1998 novel. The show, with a book by John August, premiered in Chicago, Illinois, at the Oriental Theatre from April 2013 through May 5, 2013. It opened on Broadway at the Neil Simon Theatre on October 6, 2013, following previews that began on September 5, 2013. Susan Stroman directed and choreographed, with scenic design by Julian Crouch, costume design by William Ivey Long, and lighting design by Donald Holder. Norbert Leo Butz starred as Edward Bloom with Kate Baldwin as Sandra and Bobby Steggert as Will. Big Fish brought Lippa a Drama Desk Award nomination for Outstanding Music.

== Additional work ==
In 1998, Lippa was commissioned by the Jewish Federation of Greater Vancouver to create an anthem for a concert celebrating Israel's 50th birthday, to be sung by 350 singers and conducted by Sergiu Comissiona of the Vancouver Symphony Orchestra.

As a singer, Lippa has performed at Carnegie Hall, Town Hall, The Rainbow Room, and The Supper Club. His vocal arrangements and singing can be heard in the songs of Stephen Schwartz in the animated feature The Prince of Egypt.

He has acted as Kristin Chenoweth's music director since 1999 and has conducted and played Chenoweth's concerts at the Metropolitan Opera House (January 2007), the San Francisco Symphony (2005), Carnegie Hall (2004), and the Donmar Warehouse (2002), among others. Lippa wrote the music to the "Intervention Song" for Chenoweth's funnyordie.com video.

For Halloween weekend, 2011, the Harrisburg Symphony Orchestra under the baton of Stuart Malina premiered The Addams Family Casket of Orchestral Grotesqueries, a symphonic suite from Lippa's musical The Addams Family, arranged by Lippa and Larry Hochman and orchestrated by Hochman. That same weekend the New Mexico Gay Men’s Chorus, under the direction of Aaron Howe, premiered Lippa’s “Move Toward The Darkness” from The Addams Family in a new choral arrangement by Lippa’s frequent collaborator Mary-Mitchell Campbell.

A show called Jerry Christmas, with music and lyrics by Lippa and book by Daniel Goldfarb, was produced by New York Stage and Film in 2007 but has since been shelved.

Lippa wrote the music and lyrics for The Man in the Ceiling, a musical based on Jules Feiffer's children's book of the same name, with book by Feiffer. The show, originally developed by Disney Theatrical and Tom Schumacher, had two readings in 2008 but didn't have its first full production until 2017, when it opened at the Bay Street Theater in Sag Harbor, New York. Ghostlight Records released the cast recording, featuring Gavin Creel and Kate Baldwin, on April 18, 2019.

In 2012, the San Francisco Gay Men's Chorus and several other gay men's choruses commissioned Lippa to write a musical tribute to the life and legacy of Harvey Milk. The resulting 60-minute oratorio, entitled I Am Harvey Milk and starring Lippa as Harvey Milk, premiered at San Francisco's Nourse Theater on June 26, 2013—the same day on which the U.S. Supreme Court declared Section 3 of DOMA and California Proposition 8 unconstitutional.

In November 2013, Lippa made his London debut with two concert performances at the St. James Theatre, London. Produced by James Yeoburn and Stuart Matthew Price of United Theatrical, the concert featured guest performances from Ashleigh Gray, Carrie Hope Fletcher, Jenna Russell, Tam Mutu, and Willemijn Verkaik. The concert exclusively previewed music from Lippa's latest Broadway musical Big Fish as well as a host of his other works, including I am Harvey Milk, The Addams Family, and The Man in the Ceiling.

The Life of the Party: A Celebration of the Songs of Andrew Lippa premiered at London's Menier Chocolate Factory in May 2014. The musical revue, performed by Lippa, Caroline O’Connor, Damian Humbley, and Summer Strallen, featured songs from Lippa's Broadway, Off-Broadway, and unproduced shows. The Life of the Party had its American debut in August 2016 at TheatreWorks Silicon Valley.

== Recordings and publications ==
Recordings include Julia Murney’s CD I’m Not Waiting (producer, 3 songs), The Wild Party (RCA Victor) which he also produced, You’re A Good Man, Charlie Brown (RCA Victor) which earned him a Grammy Award nomination, The Addams Family (Decca Broadway), A Little Princess (Ghostlight), I Am Harvey Milk (A Cappella), and john & jen (Ghostlight) which he associate produced. Jazz phenom Peter Cincotti recorded Lippa's song “Raise The Roof” on his CD titled On The Moon (Phil Ramone, producer). In addition, Mr. Lippa produced the original cast recording of Bat Boy for RCA Victor, and his singing voice can be heard on The Sondheim Album on Fynsworth Alley and If I Sing on PS Classics. Vocal selections from The Addams Family, A Little Princess, The Wild Party and john & jen are published by Hal Leonard, and the shows are licensed by Music Theatre International. Hal Leonard also released The Andrew Lippa Song Book in Fall 2011.

== Personal life ==
Lippa married film marketing executive David Bloch in July 2008 in Los Angeles, California, shortly after that state's supreme court handed down a ruling permitting marriage of same-sex couples. They had been dating since they met through a mutual friend in 1998 seeing William Finn's A New Brain.

Lippa moved to Columbus, Ohio in 2017.

Lippa married Tom Regouski in Columbus, Ohio on March 19, 2022. Guests included Kristin Chenoweth.

== Awards and nominations ==
- Gilman/Gonzalez-Falla Theater Foundation Award (winner)
- ASCAP Foundation Richard Rodgers New Horizons Award (winner)
- Robert and Adele S. Blank Jewish Arts Award (winner)
- Drama Desk Award for Outstanding Music (2000) - The Wild Party (winner)
- Outer Critics Circle Award (2000) - The Wild Party (winner)
- Grammy Award (2000) - You're a Good Man, Charlie Brown (nominee)
- Tony Award for Best Original Score (2010) - The Addams Family (nominee)
