= The Wave (2019 film) =

- Film poster
- Directed by: Gille Klabin
- Written by: Carl W. Lucas
- Produced by: Joshua Bunting
- Starring: Justin Long; Donald Faison; Sheila Vand; Katia Winter; Sarah Minnich; Ronnie Gene Blevins; Bill Sage; Tommy Flanagan
- Cinematography: Aaron Grasso
- Edited by: Lana Wolverton
- Music by: Angie Lee Cobbs
- Release date: September 23, 2019 (Fantastic Fest)
- Running time: 87 minutes
- Country: United States
- Language: English
- Box office: $8,101

The Wave is a 2019 American science fiction thriller film directed by Gille Klabin and distributed by Epic Pictures.

Frank, a self-absorbed insurance lawyer in a passionless marriage, goes out to a bar on a Tuesday night with his friend Jeff, to celebrate a sure promotion the next day. When he takes a hallucinogen, he finds himself bouncing around in time and space having terrible adventures. In doing so, he learns important lessons about himself and about the nature of the universe.

== Plot ==
Frank, an insurance lawyer, finds disqualifying information in the $4M insurance policy of a fireman who died from a heart attack. It guarantees him a raise and promotion, which he needs because he and his wife Cheryl have been lavishly overspending. His co-worker Jeff invites him to celebrate the night before his presentation to the company board, which he eventually accepts after a tense evening with Cheryl.

The two men visit club El Madrid, where Frank briefly meets a friendly homeless man bathing in the bathroom sink. Frank and Jeff share drinks with two women, Natalie and Theresa. Frank is attracted to Theresa, though she disapproves of his being a corporate lawyer who bankrupts and dispossesses families from their homes, which Frank thinks they deserve if they lavishly overspend. The four of them go to a house party, where Frank and Theresa agree to try a hallucinogen offered by a man named Aeolus.

Theresa administers the drug to Frank with a kiss, causing him to instantly black out and wake up alone the next morning. As Frank attempts to make sense of his situation and find his wallet, a family enters the house and calls the police on him. He runs out the back door and, though his wallet is gone, he waves down a passing taxi. He convinces the cab driver to take him home, promising a much larger fare. At home, he argues with a furious Cheryl about the smell of perfume on his shirt as he hastily dresses for work.

He slams the bedroom door to protect himself when Cheryl throws an alarm clock — one of many clocks which will teleport him around as he hallucinates. Frank is transported to his office, where he is greeted by Jeff and hurried to the board meeting. Frank presents the insurance claim information to the board members, but is immediately met with disturbing visions of them reacting with satanic glee to the $4M policy denial. He goes to the bathroom to throw up, and agrees with Jeff that he is likely still high.

Cheryl calls him and chews him out because all of their accounts have been emptied. Frank's boss tells Jeff to take him home, but the pair instead go back to the club in an attempt to find Aeolus (and Frank's wallet). The bartender who served them does not start his shift until later, so the two decide to wait till then to find the women they had partied with. While Jeff naps, Frank discovers he cannot charge his phone in Jeff's car and slaps the dashboard in frustration, suddenly turning the day to night.

At night, Natalie shows up, and the men team up with her since she says she knows the drug dealer who was working the party. The trio attempt to leave in Jeff's car but it does not start. While waiting for the car to move, Frank witnesses a car collide with a large, blinking roadside clock. He goes to help, but his consciousness is teleported away just as he is hit by another car. He finds himself next to Theresa in an ethereal field, where they talk about looking for each other. He is astounded by the stars in the night sky, which show the Milky Way as clear and close overhead. Quickly afterwards, he is teleported back into Jeff's car as it stops in front of the dealer's house.

Inside the residence, the trio learn that the guy Natalie knew, Richie, is not Aeolus. They are about to leave when Richie notices Frank is tripping, and offers him a variety of drugs that could bring him down, if Frank chooses which one to take. While the others go to the car, Frank agrees to try one of the drugs, but he is still hallucinating and can't answer when Richie asks him which drug Aeolus gave him. In his confused state, Frank grabs and consumes as many of Richie's drugs as he can. He immediately blasts away to a mythical place, where Theresa explains that the universe is always trying to achieve balance.

Frank snaps back to reality inside the car with Jeff and Natalie. He is learning that clocks and cell phones can become time-and-travel portals for him. Richie and his bodyguard Lamont are about to shoot them for stealing the drugs. Richie takes them back to his place, where Lamont duct-tapes Jeff and Natalie and beats Frank. Frank frantically promises to repay Richie and calls Cheryl to get money from her wealthy parents, but she swears at him and hangs up. Fed up, Richie is about to shoot Natalie when Frank slams his phone on the floor and snaps back to the party the previous night. He immediately finds Aeolus and sits down with him, also discovering his wallet. After talking with Aeolus, Frank transports to outside the club the next afternoon and makes a deal with the friendly homeless man. He then transports back to Richie's, and the homeless man from El Madrid shows up with $240,000 in cash from Frank's bank accounts and a new mortgage on his house. Richie and Lamont are in shock - Frank has done all this by traveling in time - but they accept the money anyway and release the trio.

Jeff drives Natalie back to El Madrid, where they find Theresa, who is now a different woman (played by a different actress) and who recognizes Frank only as a guy from the party. Frank is transported to the previous day at work, where he is asked to fill out paperwork for a $4M life insurance policy attached to his promotion. Finally realizing the universe's message and his cruelty to the victims of his corporation, he makes the fireman's widow the beneficiary of his policy. His boss sees the policy before Frank is able to mail it and threatens to fire him if he does not change it. Frank disregards the threat and time travels again, this time back to the car accident outside of the El Madrid club the night before. He walks towards it to help and is hit by the intoxicated driver from before, who is actually his boss. When the police arrive on the scene, they find Richie's drugs in the trunk of his car.

Though Frank ends up deceased on the hood of the car, his consciousness wakes up lying next to the original Theresa again.

== Cast ==
- Justin Long as Frank
- Sheila Vand as Theresa
- Donald Faison as Jeff
- Katia Winter as Natalie
- Jon Kristian Moore as Homeless Man
- Tommy Flanagan as Aeolus
- Sarah Minnich as Cheryl
- Bill Sage as Jonas
- Mark Teich as Ralph
- Ronnie Gene Blevins as Ritchie
- Jocelyn Montoya as Not Theresa
- Carl W. Lucas as Big Jesus
- Phil Duran as Police Officer

== Critical reception ==
The film received mixed to positive reviews from critics. As of October 2021, the film holds a 67% approval rating on the review aggregator website Rotten Tomatoes, based on 36 reviews with an average rating of 5.8/10. The website's critics consensus reads: "Much like its addled protagonist, The Wave struggles to stay on target, but Justin Long's performance helps this pleasantly offbeat sci-fi fantasy find its way."
