= They Look Like People =

- Film festival poster
- Directed by: Perry Blackshear
- Written by: Perry Blackshear
- Produced by: Perry Blackshear; MacLeod Andrews; Evan Dumouchel; Kimberly Parker
- Starring: MacLeod Andrews; Evan Dumouchel; Margaret Ying Drake
- Cinematography: Perry Blackshear
- Edited by: Perry Blackshear
- Distributed by: Gravitas Ventures
- Release date: January 25, 2015 (Slamdance Film Festival)
- Running time: 80 minutes
- Country: United States
- Language: English

They Look Like People is a 2015 American independent psychological horror film written and directed by Perry Blackshear in his feature directorial debut. It stars MacLeod Andrews, Evan Dumouchel and Margaret Ying Drake. Andrews plays Wyatt, a troubled man who becomes convinced that people around him are actually malevolent creatures and struggles to determine whether the threat is real.

The film had its world premiere at the 2015 Slamdance Film Festival. It received a Jury Honorable Mention for Narrative Feature at the festival.

== Plot ==
Close friends Wyatt and Christian, who have drifted apart, reunite in NYC, where Christian invites Wyatt to stay at his apartment. Wyatt has withdrawn into himself after breaking up with his fiancée, while Christian, also broken up with his fiancée, attempts to counter his insecurities with bodybuilding and aggressive machismo. As the two old friends bond, Christian invites Wyatt along on the date he has with his supervisor, Mara, and calls ahead to ask her to invite her friend.

Wyatt and Christian arrive to find that Mara's friend Sandy has fallen and injured herself. Wyatt examines Sandy and recommends she go to the hospital. Wyatt, Christian, and Mara spend the evening in the waiting room until Sandy's release, and Mara gratefully thanks Christian for staying. As Mara walks Christian to the subway, he fails to take the initiative to kiss her goodnight. Wyatt reassures Christian that Mara is probably still interested in him despite the end of the evening. After Christian falls asleep, Wyatt receives an anonymous phone call, where a muddled voice tells him he only has time to save himself, and he must leave the city and prepare for demonic invasion.

Wyatt confers with a psychiatrist about his fears of psychosis, but cuts the session short when he becomes convinced demons possess the psychiatrist himself.

Mara and Christian continue seeing each other. Wyatt receives subsequent phone calls, this time in Mara's voice, alerting him to ominous signs of the apocalypse and the demons' nature, specifically how they infect humans. Wyatt stockpiles weapons in Christian's cellar and alternately contemplates both suicide and the murder of passersby he believes possessed.

With his newfound assertiveness, Christian believes he is in line for a raise, only for Mara to reveal that he has been fired. A note on his computer, signed by his coworkers, accuses him of being an asshole. Christian returns home to find Wyatt waiting for him. Before he can say anything, Mara visits. At first, angry, Christian apologizes and invites her in. The three chat amicably, and Christian leaves to get a specific tea that Mara wanted. Wyatt invites Mara to explore the house and takes her downstairs to show her his weapon stash. Wyatt asks her for further information on the demonic invasion, alluding to her voice on the phone. When Mara realizes Wyatt's seriousness, she flees. Christian returns, disappointed that she left. Wyatt becomes highly agitated and rants about the coming demonic invasion. Christian calms him down and sets him up with a psychiatrist, the same one Christian went to when he attempted suicide.

Wyatt accosts Mara, trying to apologize, and she lashes out in self-defense, injuring him. Seeming remorseful, she helps him clean up, but he is horrified when she transforms into a demon. Wyatt runs away and finds Christian preparing to join the army to conquer his insecurities. Wyatt convinces him to leave the city and prepare for the coming apocalypse. Christian agrees, as long as Wyatt attends his psychiatric appointment. As Wyatt sees omens of the apocalypse, he instead insists that they barricade the basement. To show his trust in Wyatt, Christian allows himself to be bound and gagged in case he is possessed. On the hour of the apocalypse, Wyatt becomes convinced Christian is possessed and prepares to kill him with sulfuric acid as he watches Christian transform. At the last moment, Wyatt realizes he is hallucinating and, recognizing Christian as truly human, frees him. Christian remarks that he has finally conquered his insecurities by facing death, and the two embrace.

== Cast ==
- MacLeod Andrews as Wyatt
- Evan Dumouchel as Christian
- Margaret Ying Drake as Mara
- Mick Casale as Psychiatrist
- Elena Greenlee as Sandy

== Release ==
They Look Like People had its world premiere in the narrative competition at the 2015 Slamdance Film Festival, where it received a Jury Honorable Mention for Narrative Feature. During its subsequent festival run, the film received jury awards at the Independent Film Festival Boston, SF IndieFest and the Nashville Film Festival, as well as the Most Innovative Film award at the Fantasia International Film Festival.

Gravitas Ventures acquired the film for theatrical, video-on-demand and digital distribution in 2015. Following a theatrical run in Los Angeles, the film was released digitally and on video on demand on March 11, 2016.

== Reception ==
On Rotten Tomatoes, the film holds an approval rating of 92% based on 13 reviews.

Katie Walsh of the Los Angeles Times described the film as an effective and unsettling psychological thriller, praising Blackshear's sound design and restrained staging, as well as Andrews's performance. She also highlighted the relationship between Wyatt and Christian as central to the film's treatment of friendship and trust.

Nick Allen of The Film Stage was more critical, arguing that the film relied too heavily on horror conventions and criticizing its central performance and narrative execution. He nevertheless praised Blackshear's cinematography, particularly its use of wide shots, lighting and shadows.
