= Night Finds You =

- True Detective episode
- Episode no.: Season 2 Episode 2
- Directed by: Justin Lin
- Written by: Nic Pizzolatto
- Cinematography by: Nigel Bluck
- Editing by: Alex Hall
- Original air date: June 28, 2015
- Running time: 58 minutes

Guest appearances
- Ritchie Coster as Mayor Austin Chessani; Lolita Davidovich as Cynthia Woodrugh; W. Earl Brown as Detective Teague Dixon; Rick Springfield as Dr. Irving Pitlor; Christopher James Baker as Blake Churchman; Chris Kerson as Nails; Ronnie Gene Blevins as Stan; Andy Mackenzie as Ivar; Afemo Omilami as Police Chief Holloway; James Frain as Lieutenant Kevin Burris; Michael Hyatt as Katherine Davis; Alex Fernandez as James O'Neal; Michael Irby as Detective Elvis Ilinca; Adria Arjona as Emily; Lera Lynn as Singer; Yara Martinez as Felicia; Abigail Spencer as Gena Brune; Pedro Miguel Arce as Danny Santos; Matt Battaglia as Commander Floyd Heschmeyer; C. S. Lee as Attorney General Richard Geldof; Jon Lindstrom as Jacob McCandless; Alain Uy as Ernst Bodine; Kerry Barker as Assistant; Weronika Rosati as Agnes; Jamison Jones as Will Davidson; Anjul Nigam as Ventura County Medical Examiner; Gary Carlos Cervantes as Car Owner; David Pressman as Vinci Police; Toni Youngblood as Police Tech

Episode chronology
← Previous "The Western Book of the Dead"	Next → "Maybe Tomorrow"
- True Detective (season 2)

"Night Finds You" is the second episode of the second season of the American anthology crime drama television series True Detective. It is the 10th overall episode of the series and was written by series creator Nic Pizzolatto, and directed by Justin Lin. It was first broadcast on HBO in the United States on June 28, 2015.

The season is set in California, and focuses on three detectives, Ray Velcoro (Colin Farrell), Ani Bezzerides (Rachel McAdams) and Paul Woodrugh (Taylor Kitsch), from three cooperating police forces and a criminal-turned-businessman named Frank Semyon (Vince Vaughn) as they investigate a series of crimes they believe are linked to the murder of a corrupt politician. In the episode, Velcoro, Bezzerides and Woodrugh start investigating Caspere's death while Semyon works on his own after seeing his business decline.

According to Nielsen Media Research, the episode was seen by an estimated 3.05 million household viewers and gained a 1.3 ratings share among adults aged 18–49. The episode received positive reviews from critics, who praised the performances and the shocking ending, although some criticized the pace and writing.

== Plot ==
California State Attorneys Richard Geldof (C. S. Lee) and Katherine Davis (Michael Hyatt) discuss Ben Caspere's murder with other figures, including the California Highway Patrol and Vinci police department, and decide to cooperate in the case among the different departments. Velcoro (Colin Farrell) and Bezzerides (Rachel McAdams) are assigned to the case, while Woodrugh (Taylor Kitsch) is also sent to participate as he found Caspere's corpse, with the hope that it will reinstate his image and promote him to detective.

Bezzerides is told by her boss that she must also investigate Velcoro while investigating Caspere, as he is under suspicion of corruption. Velcoro is asked by Vinci Mayor Austin Chessani (Ritchie Coster), Police Chief Holloway (Afemo Omilami), and Lieutenant Kevin Burris (James Frain) to focus on the case and make sure state investigators do not find evidence of corruption in the city. They also inform Velcoro that Detective Teague Dixon (W. Earl Brown) will assist Velcoro on the case to help control the flow of information.

Bezzerides, Velcoro, and Woodrugh are shown Caspere's autopsy. The coroner states that along with his eyes burned out with acid, Caspere was bound upside down and tortured, and his genitals were shot off with a shotgun before being placed at the rest stop. Velcoro confides this information to Semyon (Vince Vaughn), who acknowledges partnering with Caspere but discloses no other information to Velcoro.

Meanwhile, Semyon struggles with his business dealings, as the money he gave Caspere for the high-speed rail deal was embezzled and never delivered to the landowners, leading him to lose $5 million. Semyon confides in his wife, Jordan (Kelly Reilly), about his abusive childhood, and wonders if he is in purgatory.

Bezzerides and Velcoro question Chessani, who states that the last time he saw Caspere was at a party with his date, a woman named Tascha. Going back to their investigation office, Woodrugh informs Velcoro and Bezzerides that he found out that Caspere took $4,000 out of his bank account monthly, and the withdrawal dates correspond in his calendar with blank days. They also discover that Caspere was often going out of the city during the weekends to upstate California.

Velcoro goes to meet with Chad, but is actually confronted by his ex-wife, Gena (Abigail Spencer), who is aware that he had a role in attacking Aspen Conroy and his father. She informs him that she will seek supervised visits and full custody of Chad; and, if Velcoro tries to fight back, Gena will get a paternity test, something that Velcoro fears as it might reveal whether or not he is Chad's father.

Velcoro and Bezzerides question Dr. Irving Pitlor (Rick Springfield), Caspere's psychiatrist at a boutique medical center. He states that Caspere had an affinity for young women and often expensed escorts and prostitutes, which further increased his "damaging tendencies." Before they leave, Pitlor recognizes Bezzerides from her father's meditation center, colloquially known as the Good People. Bezzerides explains that she has "left all that behind," along with several siblings either deceased or in jail. As they drive away from the medical center, Velcoro and Bezzerides talk about their respective methods and tactics as detectives. Meanwhile, Semyon talks with Chessani about Caspere, intending to find out more about his death on his own, but gets no viable information. He asks to meet Caspere's murderer if he or she is ever found.

Woodrugh visits his impoverished mother, Cynthia (Lolita Davidovich), but is too reserved to talk about any of his problems. Back at the apartment, he is confronted by Emily (Adria Arjona) with a tabloid article detailing the Lacey Lindel incident. Emily questions Woodrugh about information in the article, including Woodrugh's time in the U.S. Army with a group named Black Mountain Security. Woodrugh refuses to talk more about his past, prompting Emily to break up with him. He leaves the apartment and goes home. Elsewhere, Ilinca (Michael Irby) informs Bezzerides that several months prior, Vera made a call to her former roommate, asking if anyone was looking for her; the call is traced to Guerneville.

Semyon visits a strip club, led by associate Danny Santos (Pedro Miguel Arce), to talk with a prostitute. She mentions that Caspere had a house in Hollywood where he often had sex with prostitutes. Semyon then meets with Velcoro at Felicia's (Yara Martinez) bar, telling him to investigate the house and retrieve anything regarding the money that Caspere embezzled, promising that he can get him a promotion to Chief of Police in Vinci. Velcoro is not interested and makes it clear he does not want to keep working for him. Felicia advises Velcoro to consider getting another job, and Velcoro leaves her the money Semyon left on the table.

Despite that, Velcoro decides to visit Caspere's Hollywood house anyway. Inside, he finds a sink overflowing with water; BDSM equipment; animal masks on the wall; an old radio playing Bobby Bland's "I Pity the Fool"; a pool of blood on the floor; and a webcam filming in a spare closet. As he turns to leave, he is suddenly shot with a shotgun by a person wearing a raven mask. The man then stands over Velcoro, shooting him in the chest.

== Production ==
=== Development ===
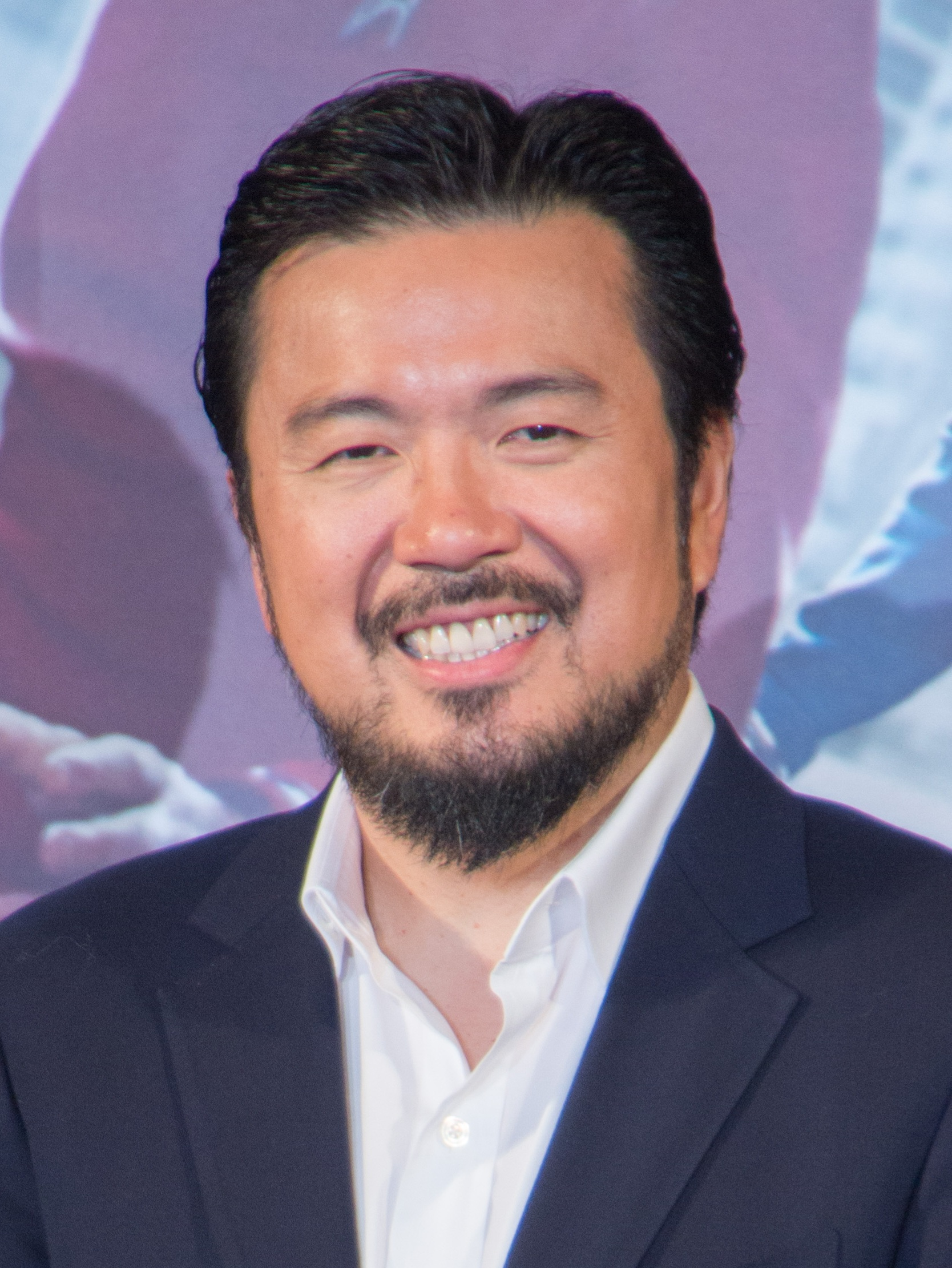
Justin Lin directed the episode.

In June 2015, the episode's title was revealed as "Night Finds You" and it was announced that series creator Nic Pizzolatto had written the episode while Justin Lin had directed it. This was Pizzolatto's tenth writing credit, and Lin's second directing credit.

== Reception ==
=== Viewers ===
The episode was watched by 3.05 million viewers, earning a 1.3 in the 18-49 rating demographics on the Nielson ratings scale. This means that 1.3 percent of all households with televisions watched the episode. This was a slight decrease from the previous episode, which was watched by 3.17 million viewers with a 1.4 in the 18-49 demographics.

=== Critical reviews ===
"Night Finds You" received positive reviews from critics. The review aggregator website Rotten Tomatoes reported an 83% approval rating for the episode, based on 23 reviews, with an average rating of 7.07/10. The site's consensus states: "With 'Night Finds You', True Detective deftly contextualizes its four main characters, even if some of their backstories feel stale."

Roth Cornet of IGN gave the episode a "great" 8 out of 10 and wrote in her verdict, "With its second installment, True Detective Season 2 has now fully set the stage for this story of corruption, greed, revenge, and murder. A necessary sense of tension and anticipation was created with a dramatic close to the episode. Other than the shock of that blast, though, it's the subtle human moments that stand out as the most engaging of the night. Well, that and the dead guy on the slab with no eyes or penis. In total, 'Night Finds You' leaves one with a sense of curiosity about what is to come."

Erik Adams of The A.V. Club gave the episode a "B−" grade and wrote, "It's a hell of a cliffhanger for the second episode of a show that just reinvented itself a week ago. It's weird, yes, but it's also unexpected — two habits True Detective would do well to indulge in more frequently." Britt Hayes of Screen Crush wrote, "Where last week set the table for the season to come and offered a solid, gritty introduction to our main characters, 'Night Finds You' sets the wheels spinning as corruption of various sorts permeates the entire episode."

Alan Sepinwall of HitFix wrote, "Because I felt ambivalence about so many of the other main characters, I ultimately couldn't decide at the time whether I wanted Ray to be dead or not. But there's something to be said for it being the first real surprise of the opening chapters." Gwilym Mumford of The Guardian wrote, "Ray's backstory seems too finely knitted in this season's plot and I don't think Colin Farrell would sign on for such a brief role. I certainly hope that Ray's alive: Farrell is the best thing about this nascent season of True Detective." Ben Travers of IndieWire gave the episode a "C" grade and wrote, "Other than the admittedly shocking ending, Episode 2 felt too much like filler even when that groundwork seemed necessary for future conflict."

Jeff Jensen of Entertainment Weekly wrote, "The pieces of the puzzle start to come together, culminating in a shocking (and very violent) cliffhanger." Aaron Riccio of Slant Magazine wrote, "If Ray is genuinely dead, will anyone care? As Mayor Austin unflinchingly puts it to Frank, whose liquidity issues have caused him to be late with his kickback for the first time in six years, probably not. Every destination is also a beginning for someone else, and money launders itself on: “The world will turn, uncaring of our struggles.”"

Kenny Herzog of Vulture gave the episode a 4 star rating out of 5 and wrote, "This whole Caspere mess has drawn in four personalities who represent different sides of the same coins, and even if their carpool banter isn't always crisp (something about robot dicks and flies), it's worth waiting to see whether they find the same page or tear themselves apart. Hopefully, in the short term, it's the former. If not, Ray's on his own contending with one seriously creepy dude with a crow's mask and a close-range shotgun." Tony Sokol of Den of Geek gave the episode a 4 star rating out of 5 and wrote, "If you're not hooked by the end of the episode, I feel bad for you, and if you are, next week can't come fast enough. I gasped. The episode builds slowly and relentlessly and ends with a bang, several."

Carissa Pavlica of TV Fanatic gave the episode a 4 star rating out of 5 and wrote, "Without a reason for a bulletproof vest, we were left wondering about the fate of Colin Farrell's Ray Volcoro at the end of 'Night Finds You'. Eh, do we really expect him to die? Probably not. But it was a shocking scene, nonetheless." Shane Ryan of Paste gave the episode an 8.4 out of 10 and wrote, "Pizzolatto's achievement, thus far, has been to create a worldview more impermeable than even the bleak outlook espoused by Rust Cohle. The pleasure of this series will be in watching how hope blooms between the cracks in the cement — or whether anything blooms at all."
