= Maybe Tomorrow (True Detective) =

- True Detective episode
- Episode no.: Season 2 Episode 3
- Directed by: Janus Metz Pedersen
- Written by: Nic Pizzolatto
- Cinematography by: Nigel Bluck
- Editing by: Chris Figler
- Original air date: July 5, 2015
- Running time: 58 minutes

Guest appearances
- Ritchie Coster as Mayor Austin Chessani; Vinicius Machado as Tony Chessani; Fred Ward as Eddie Velcoro; Christopher James Baker as Blake Churchman; W. Earl Brown as Detective Teague Dixon; Alex Fernandez as James O'Neal; James Frain as Lieutenant Kevin Burris; Michael Hyatt as Katherine Davis; Michael Irby as Detective Elvis Ilinca; Afemo Omilami as Police Chief Holloway; Pedro Miguel Arce as Danny Santos; Gabriel Luna as Miguel Gilb; Chris Kerson as Nails; Andy Mackenzie as Ivar; Yara Martinez as Felicia; Timothy V. Murphy as Osip Agronov; Abigail Spencer as Gena Brune; Christian Campbell as Richard Brune; Jake La Botz as Conway Twitty; Agnes Olech as Veronica Chessani; Emily Rios as Betty Chessani; Weronika Rosati as Agnes; Chet Grissom as Bart Sallis; Courtney Halverson as Erica Jonson; Roberto Medina as Dr. Burke; Alex Rich as Tyler; Solomon Shiv as Michael Bulgari; Alain Uy as Ernst Bodine; Troy Vincent as Dan Czarn; Philip Moon as Ashley Daison; Michael Edwin as Tony Transpo; Luke Edwards as Lenny Tyler; Joey Jennings as Colter; Riley Smith as Steve Mercer; Carlos Ayala as Constantine; Chez'Ney Hadley as Hooker; Ana Mercedes as Mrs. Peru; J. Francisco Rodriguez as Tommy Peru; Keir Thirus as Vinci PD; Eltony Williams as Fregredo

Episode chronology
← Previous "Night Finds You"	Next → "Down Will Come"
- True Detective (season 2)

"Maybe Tomorrow" is the third episode of the second season of the American anthology crime drama television series True Detective. It is the 11th overall episode of the series and was written by series creator Nic Pizzolatto, and directed by Janus Metz. It was first broadcast on HBO in the United States on July 5, 2015.

The season is set in California, and focuses on three detectives, Ray Velcoro (Colin Farrell), Ani Bezzerides (Rachel McAdams) and Paul Woodrugh (Taylor Kitsch), from three cooperating police forces and a criminal-turned-businessman named Frank Semyon (Vince Vaughn) as they investigate a series of crimes they believe are linked to the murder of a corrupt politician. In the episode, Velcoro survives an attack and returns with Bezzerides and Woodrugh to investigate Caspere's death, while Semyon has his authority tested by former allies.

According to Nielsen Media Research, the episode was seen by an estimated 2.62 million household viewers and gained a 1.1 ratings share among adults aged 18–49. The episode received generally positive reviews from critics, who praised the performances and character development, although some expressed frustration with the anticlimactic resolution to the previous episode.

== Plot ==
In a dream sequence, Velcoro (Colin Farrell) talks with his father, Eddie (Fred Ward), a retired police officer, at Felicia's (Yara Martinez) bar. A man dressed as Conway Twitty sings "The Rose" on stage. Eddie reprimands his son for failing to show his "grit." When Velcoro asks where they are, Eddie tells him he does not know, and that Velcoro was there first.

In real life, Velcoro wakes up in Caspere's house with no major wounds from the bullets, as the shotgun was loaded with rubber-pelleted riot control police rounds. As he is tended to by medics, Bezzerides (Rachel McAdams) arrives and reprimands him for entering the scene without her. In the house, a webcam and a hard drive are reported to have been stolen.

Meanwhile, Semyon (Vince Vaughn) begins suffering erectile dysfunction during an IVF clinic visit, with his mind occupied by thoughts surrounding Caspere's death and the land deal. He later meets with Velcoro at Felicia's bar; Velcoro demands to know if anyone knew about what was going to happen at Caspere's house, implying that Semyon set up Velcoro's attack, but Semyon claims no knowledge. Semyon then tells Velcoro that he worked with Caspere for the past few years, but does not mention the land deal.

Bezzerides and Woodrugh (Taylor Kitsch) attempt to find a connection between Caspere and Mayor Chessani (Ritchie Coster), so they visit his Bel Air mansion. They meet his Slavic trophy wife, Veronica (Agnes Albright), who spends her days intoxicated. They also meet her moody stepdaughter, Betty (Emily Rios), and problematic stepson, Tony (Vinicius Zorin-Machado), a specialty event organizer. Nothing in the house provides Bezzerides and Woodrugh with any help. Chessani is angry about the encounter and threatens to remove them from the case.

Later, Bezzerides and Woodrugh find Caspere's safe deposit box, which includes articles of incorporation for several LLCs as well as blue diamonds. Back in Ventura County, Bezzerides' fling, Steve Mercer (Riley Smith), arrives at the station. Bezzerides breaks up with him and he angrily storms out.

Velcoro visits a doctor, who chastises him for his drug use and bad health habits, then asks if he truly wants to be alive. Later, Velcoro visits Eddie to give him marijuana, which helps him sleep. During their talk, Eddie mentions throwing his police badge in the garbage and talks about his encounters with Holloway (Afemo Omilami) and Burris (James Frain), lamenting the way the justice system has changed since his retirement. Velcoro salvages his father's badge from the trash and studies it.

Semyon visits Bart Sallis (Chet Grissom), a former associate and construction manager in Vinci, and forces Sallis to renege 25% of a former deal back to him every month. Later, Semyon is informed by Osip (Timothy V. Murphy) that he is leaving for Las Vegas amid the land deal crisis, angering him. After he leaves, he wonders if Osip had a role in Caspere's death. He is later informed that Stan, one of his associates, has been found dead. Upon inspecting the body, Semyon sees that Stan's eyes have been burned out.

Meanwhile, Woodrugh reconnects with an old friend from the private security firm Black Mountain, Miguel Gilb (Gabriel Luna), and they go to a Motocross race. As they exit, Glib begins to talk about their time in the war and implies a sexual relationship they had while serving. Woodrugh punches Glib, knocking him to the ground and leaving him. Unbeknownst to either of them, Dixon (W. Earl Brown) takes pictures of the encounter from the upper level of the stadium.

Tracing the Cadillac that possibly drove Caspere to the rest stop, Velcoro and Bezzerides visit a movie set, where a similar car was reported missing one week before Caspere's death. Velcoro and Bezzerides learn that because Caspere allowed the crew to film in Vinci, he received an associate producer credit and thus frequented the set. A set photographer recognizes a photo of Caspere and claims that Caspere and the film's director, Ashley Daison (Philip Moon), would frequently attend parties together. While on set, Velcoro and Bezzerides run into Caspere's assistant.

That night, Bezzerides and Velcoro drink at his house when Gena (Abigail Spencer) shows up. She says the police questioned her about Velcoro's actions and possible corruption, including the death of her assailant years prior. She offers to give him $10,000 to drop the custody battle and leave town, which he refuses.

Woodrugh goes through downtown Los Angeles and asks various prostitutes if they recognize Caspere, to no avail. He briefly sees a young man in an angel costume giving oral sex to an unseen individual. Later, a male prostitute recognizes the picture of Caspere and takes him to a strip club Caspere frequented named Lux Infinitum. In the strip club, another male prostitute suggests that Caspere was a voyeur, and that Caspere asked him to have sex in front of him with a European prostitute named Tascha. While in the club, Woodrough inadvertently runs into Semyon. Afterward, Semyon confronts Danny Santos (Pedro Miguel Arce) for failing to support him and brutally attacks him before removing his golden teeth.

Based on a tip, Bezzerides and Velcoro question a former movie production employee from the set but realize he is innocent. While questioning him, a masked person lights on fire the Cadillac that drove Caspere to the rest stop. They chase the masked man through a homeless encampment, but the man manages to evade them. As Bezzerides nears him on the highway, she narrowly avoids getting hit by a semi-truck as Velcoro pulls her out of the way. Afterward, he asks her about the evidence of corruption the state might have against him, but Bezzerides claims not to know anything.

In the final scene, Semyon returns home to find Jordan (Kelly Reilly) awake, who wants to reconcile after Semyon's incident at the IVF clinic. Semyon drops Santos' teeth in the garbage. She asks if they can talk, to which he replies, "Maybe tomorrow."

== Production ==
=== Development ===
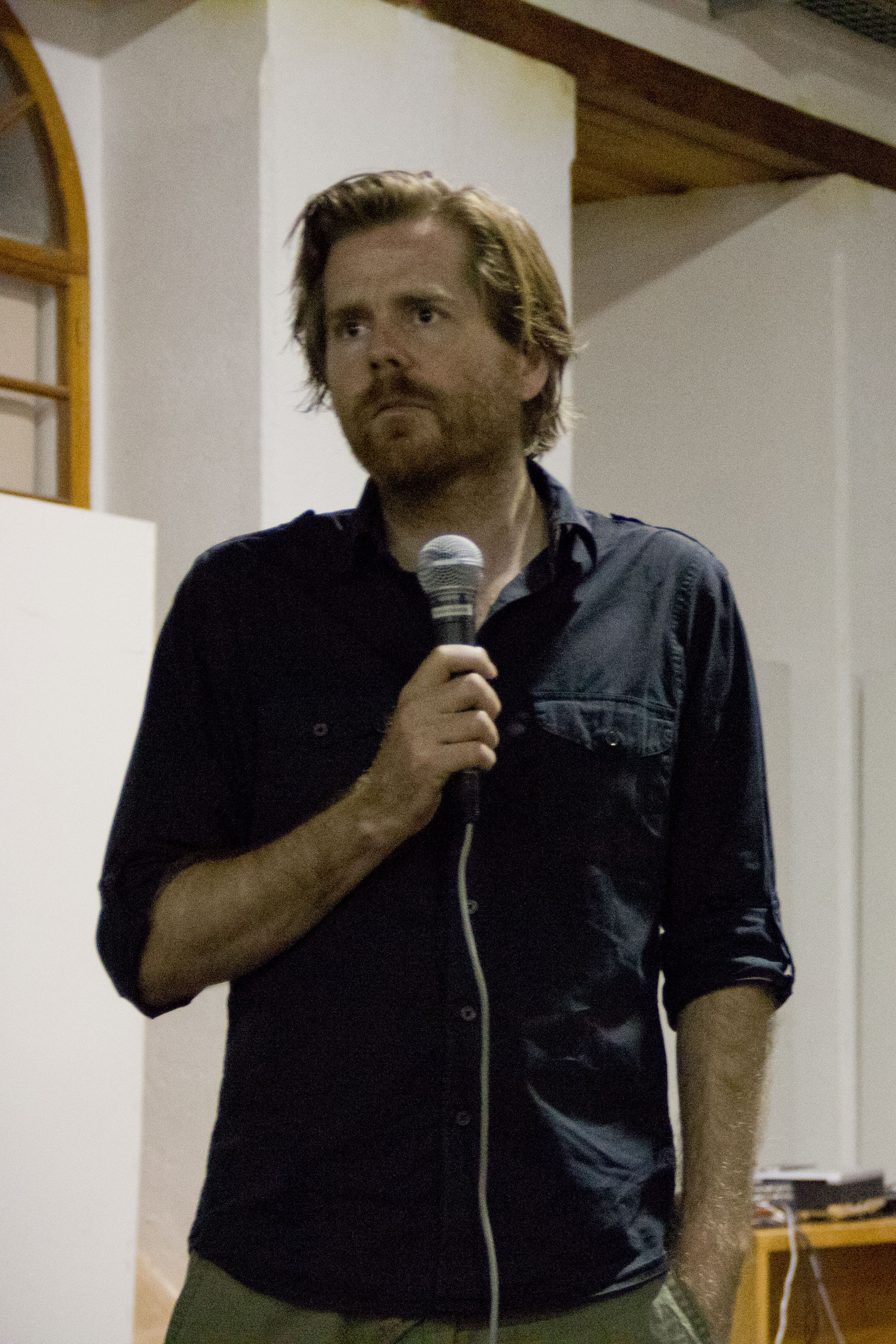
Janus Metz directed the episode.

In June 2015, the episode's title was revealed as "Maybe Tomorrow" and it was announced that series creator Nic Pizzolatto had written the episode while Janus Metz had directed it. This was Pizzolatto's eleventh writing credit, and Metz's first directing credit.

== Reception ==
=== Viewers ===
The episode was watched by 2.62 million viewers, earning a 1.1 in the 18-49 rating demographics on the Nielson ratings scale. This means that 1.1 percent of all households with televisions watched the episode. This was a 15% decrease from the previous episode, which was watched by 3.05 million viewers with a 1.3 in the 18-49 demographics.

=== Critical reviews ===
"Maybe Tomorrow" received generally positive reviews from critics. The review aggregator website Rotten Tomatoes reported a 71% approval rating for the episode, based on 28 reviews, with an average rating of 7.5/10. The site's consensus states: "'Maybe Tomorrow' serves as a dark, stylish diversion from earlier episodes, even if it offers a somewhat less-than-satisfying conclusion to a previous cliffhanger."

Roth Cornet of IGN gave the episode a "great" 8 out of 10 and wrote in her verdict, "The third installment of True Detective's second season has the potential to become a pivotal turing point for fans. This is the moment where we really decide if we're in or if we're out. While on the whole this season has been uneven, based on the continued development of Velcoro's character - who reads as the most nuanced - and the turns that the murder investigation has taken (what's with that animal mask?) I'm in for now. How about you?"

Erik Adams of The A.V. Club gave the episode a "B+" grade and wrote, "If season two is going to put so much emphasis on its investigations, eventually those façades will have to give way to hard evidence. For now, though, there's enough bang in 'Maybe Tomorrow' to make me wish I could jump into the next installment." Britt Hayes of Screen Crush wrote, "That said, now that we've arrived at episode 3, there's less exposition and more character work at play. I still find this season to be a little too verbose, and if it has any one, specific issue it's the volume of characters and stories. But Pizzolatto is clearly working all these threads to tie them together into something cohesive and possibly great near the end of the season, and watching him do so — whether it's graceful or a bit clumsy — has its rewards."

Alan Sepinwall of HitFix wrote, "This was a stranger episode than the first two, and a slightly better one. Is that a coincidence, or is it that Pizzolatto, like Paul Woodrugh, needs to accept a part of him (or, at least, part of his writing style) that he tries to dismiss?" Gwilym Mumford of The Guardian wrote, "There are revelations from Paul's military past and some unexpected dental work, and e-cigarettes come in for more stick." Ben Travers of IndieWire gave the episode a "B+" grade and wrote, "Pizzolatto got his groove back in Episode 3. Even with an imperfect episode, 'Maybe Tomorrow' gave us the good reason to believe the best is yet to come."

Jeff Jensen of Entertainment Weekly wrote, "More masks, more hard-boiled angst, and more apocalypse for everyone." Aaron Riccio of Slant Magazine wrote, "When everything is shit in the present, the best we can do, perhaps, is to wait it out and hope for the best."

Kenny Herzog of Vulture gave the episode a 4 star rating out of 5 and wrote, "These four lost souls are living in Wyler/Kingsley's Detective Story in full color, where crazy killers in masks come out from darkness, stalk you, and light that stolen Cadillac you've been searching for ablaze, only to race back into the night. Where everyone seems to be in on something but you. It's a movie, but it's real life, and it's all a bit distorted." Tony Sokol of Den of Geek gave the episode a 4 star rating out of 5 and wrote, "In an eight episode arc, when compared to the five seasons of Game of Thrones, this is about the point in the story that the gang on Thrones lost daddy Stark. Well they didn't lose him so much as they misplaced his head. Nic Pizzolatto is playing with that very dynamic. He's a novelist, you know."

Carissa Pavlica of TV Fanatic gave the episode a 3.5 star rating out of 5 and wrote, "Forgive me if I'm thick, but I cannot for the life of me figure out in what direction the case is going. Some of the dialog is disturbingly comical and throws off the scent of the big picture. However, it felt like we were given a better understanding of why Ray and Ani were chosen to be leads on the case, whatever it may be." Shane Ryan of Paste gave the episode an 8.5 out of 10 and wrote, "Aligned against the killer, aligned against their bosses, aligned against the encroaching corruption on ever side. It's an intriguing possibility, and for the first time since the new season began, I can honestly say that I'm dying to see what comes next."
