= True Detective season 2 =

Season of television series

True Detective
- Season 2
- Blu-ray cover
- Showrunner: Nic Pizzolatto
- Starring: Colin Farrell; Rachel McAdams; Taylor Kitsch; Kelly Reilly; Vince Vaughn
- No. of episodes: 8

Release
- Original network: HBO
- Original release: June 21 – August 9, 2015

Season chronology
- ← Previous; Season 1 Next → Season 3

The second season of True Detective, an American anthology crime drama television series created by Nic Pizzolatto, began airing on June 21, 2015, on the premium cable network HBO. With a principal cast of Colin Farrell, Rachel McAdams, Taylor Kitsch, Kelly Reilly, and Vince Vaughn, the season comprises eight episodes and concluded its initial airing on August 9, 2015.

The season's story takes place in California and follows the interweaving stories of officers from three cooperating police departments; when California Highway Patrol officer and war veteran Paul Woodrugh (Kitsch) discovers the body of corrupt city manager Ben Caspere on the side of a highway, Vinci Police Department detective Raymond "Ray" Velcoro (Farrell) and Ventura County Sheriff's Office Criminal Investigation Division Sergeant Antigone "Ani" Bezzerides (McAdams) are called to assist in the following investigation. Career criminal Francis "Frank" Semyon (Vaughn) attempts to legitimize his business with his wife Jordan (Reilly) by investing in a rail project overseen by Caspere, but loses his money when Caspere is killed, prompting him to start his own investigation.

Unlike the previous season, the second season of True Detective was met with mixed reviews from television critics; praise was given to the cinematography, performances, action sequences, and setting, but was criticized for the pace, narrative, and writing, particularly for its convoluted plot and weak dialogue, with many deeming the season disappointing and significantly inferior to the previous season, and was named one of the worst television series of 2015.

== Cast ==
=== Main cast ===
- Colin Farrell as Detective Ray Velcoro, a corrupt detective from the Vinci Police Department
- Rachel McAdams as Detective Sergeant Antigone "Ani" Bezzerides, a Ventura County Sheriff's Office CID agent
- Taylor Kitsch as Officer Paul Woodrugh, a California Highway Patrol officer, veteran, and former employee of a private security firm
- Vince Vaughn as Frank Semyon, a career criminal and entrepreneur who struggles financially after his partner's death
- Kelly Reilly as Jordan Semyon, Semyon's wife

=== Recurring cast ===
- Ritchie Coster as Austin Chessani, Vinci's corrupt mayor
- Christopher James Baker as Blake Churchman, one of Semyon's men
- Afemo Omilami as William Holloway, the Vinci chief of police
- Michael Irby as Detective Elvis Ilinca, Bezzerides' partner
- Leven Rambin as Athena Bezzerides, Bezzerides' camgirl sister
- Abigail Spencer as Gena Brune, Velcoro's ex-wife
- Lolita Davidovich as Cynthia Woodrugh, Woodrugh's mother
- James Frain as Kevin Burris, a lieutenant under Holloway
- Riley Smith as Steve Mercer, a California police officer
- Adria Arjona as Emily, Woodrugh's girlfriend
- Michael Hyatt as Katherine Davis, a non-corrupt state attorney
- Yara Martinez as Felicia, a bar owner and friend of Semyon
- Christian Campbell as Richard Brune, Gena's husband
- Jon Lindstrom as Jacob McCandless, a powerful businessman
- Emily Rios as Betty Chessani, Chessani's daughter
- Vinicius Machado as Tony Chessani, Chessani's delinquent son
- Ronnie Gene Blevins as Stan, Semyon's loyal man
- Timothy V. Murphy as Osip Agranov, a Russian-Israeli businessman and rival to Semyon
- C. S. Lee as Richard Geldof, the Attorney General of California
- Chris Kerson as Nails, Semyon's loyal man
- Rick Springfield as Dr. Irving Pitlor, a plastic surgeon and Caspere's psychiatrist
- Ashley Hinshaw as Lacey Lindel, an actress who runs afoul of Woodrugh
- W. Earl Brown as Detective Teague Dixon, a detective assigned to work on Caspere's murder
- David Morse as Eliot Bezzerides, Bezzerides' father
- Gabriel Luna as Miguel Gilb, Woodrugh's former coworker
- Fred Ward as Eddie Velcoro, Velcoro's father (this was Ward's final acting role before his death in May 2022)

== Episodes ==
No. overall	No. in season	Title	Directed by	Written by	Original release date	U.S. viewers (millions)
9	1	"The Western Book of the Dead"	Justin Lin	Nic Pizzolatto	June 21, 2015	3.17
In the fictional industrial town of Vinci in California, city manager Ben Caspere disappears before he can present plans for his development of a high-speed rail line, leaving his criminal partner Frank Semyon to pitch to Russian businessman Osip Agronov, who refuses to go through with anything until Caspere is present. Corrupt and volatile detective Ray Velcoro is tasked by Semyon with finding Caspere, finding evidence in his house of a kidnapping. Highway Patrol officer and veteran Paul Woodrugh is falsely accused of sexual misconduct by an actress he pulled over, leading him to be put on paid leave temporarily. After his girlfriend Emily inquires about the scars on his body, he abruptly leaves and speeds dangerously down a dark highway until he comes across Caspere's corpse on a bench, his eyes burned out with hydrochloric acid.
10	2	"Night Finds You"	Justin Lin	Nic Pizzolatto	June 28, 2015	3.05
Velcoro, detective Teague Dixon, and Ventura County detective Antigone "Ani" Bezzerides are tasked with finding Caspere's killer, while Woodrugh joins them in hopes that helping will speed his misconduct investigation along. Velcoro's ex-wife Gena Brune learns that he attacked his son Chad's bully's father, and demands full custody. She threatens to get a paternity test, Chad being a possible product of rape and Velcoro being fearful of finding out who the real father is. Emily leaves Woodrugh after he continually refuses to discuss his past. Semyon learns that the money Caspere used in the rail deal was embezzled, losing Semyon most of his money. He learns from a prostitute that Caspere had a house where he would take women to have sex, and he passes this information to Velcoro. Velcoro finds Caspere's blood in the house and a camera recording the living room, but is shot in the chest with rubber bullets by a crow-masked assailant before he can investigate further.
11	3	"Maybe Tomorrow"	Janus Metz	Nic Pizzolatto	July 5, 2015	2.62
Velcoro regains consciousness to find the camera's drive stolen. Bezzerides and Woodrugh visit the mansion of Vinci mayor Austin Chessani, hoping to find a link between him and Caspere, and meet his delinquent son Tony. A car that may have been carrying Caspere on the night of his murder, stolen from a film set, is picked up on traffic cameras. As Bezzerides and Velcoro question an employee of the production company who recently quit, the nearby car is set on fire by another masked individual. Woodrugh crosses paths with Miguel Glib, an old friend of his from his former job at a private security firm, but he violently rejects him when he references a sexual encounter they almost had. Stan, one of Semyon's men, is found dead, his eyes burned out like Caspere's.
12	4	"Down Will Come"	Jeremy Podeswa	Nic Pizzolatto & Scott Lasser	July 12, 2015	2.36
Semyon begins to cut deals with drug suppliers to start making back the money Caspere stole. Velcoro gives Chad his grandfather's police badge. Bezzerides is placed on temporary leave after being accused of sexual harassment by a male coworker. Woodrugh awakens in bed with Miguel, leaving quickly. He later meets with Emily, who reveals she is pregnant, and he impulsively proposes to her. Having investigated nearby pawnshops, he learns that prostitute Irina Rulfo stole items from Caspere's house and tried to sell them. The police conduct a raid on her pimp Ledo Amarilla's meth lab, which escalates into a lengthy shootout that kills dozens of officers, criminals, and bystanders, Dixon amongst them. Amarilla is killed after he takes and kills a hostage, leaving Velcoro, Bezzerides, and Woodrugh as the only survivors.
13	5	"Other Lives"	John Crowley	Nic Pizzolatto	July 19, 2015	2.42
Two months later, Amarilla is blamed for Caspere's murder, Velcoro works full-time for Semyon, Bezzerides is stuck in the evidence room, and Woodrugh settles his investigation but is unwillingly promoted to insurance fraud detective. After learning that attorney general Richard Geldof is planning to run for governor, his colleague Katherine Davis assembles the three and requests they look into Rulfo, suspecting that Caspere's true killer was covered up. Semyon orders Velcoro to tail Blake Churchman, one of his men that he is suspicious of, and Velcoro observes him picking up girls from Caspere's psychiatrist, Irving Pitlor, and delivering them to Agronov and Tony. He tortures Pitlor, who admits that Tony and Caspere bought the women for their "parties." Woodrugh investigates diamonds found in Caspere's safety deposit box, learning that Dixon had also been looking for them. While searching for missing woman Vera Machiado, Bezzerides investigates the last place she called from and finds a shed nearby with blood on the floor. Velcoro learns that Semyon lied to him about the identity of Brune's rapist, the murder of the man he thought was responsible being the event that corrupted him. He goes to Semyon's house and demands to talk to him.
14	6	"Church in Ruins"	Miguel Sapochnik	Nic Pizzolatto & Scott Lasser	July 26, 2015	2.34
Semyon convinces Velcoro that he got bad information and never meant to mislead him. Velcoro visits the real rapist in prison and promises to kill him if he does not get a life sentence. After an awkward, supervised visit with Chad, he breaks his two months of sobriety and calls Brune, promising her full custody so long as she never tests for Chad's true parentage. Semyon deals with the Mexican cartel for Rulfo's location and learns that she was hired by a police officer to steal from Caspere, but the cartel kills her for working with the police before she can give up a name. Woodrugh learns that the diamonds were stolen during the 1992 Los Angeles riots from a couple, the Ostermans, whose children were left orphaned by the robbers. Bezzerides poses as her ex-prostitute sister to infiltrate one of Tony's parties, where she sees both Geldof and Vinci chief of police William Holloway. She is forced to take powerful MDMA and hallucinates a man leading her into his car. She encounters Machiado and kills a guard to help her escape. Woodrugh steals documents from Agronov's office that prove he is colluding with Tony after observing him meeting with businessman Jacob McCandless, where he overhears them confirming they set up Semyon to lose his shares. They all escape with Velcoro.
15	7	"Black Maps and Motel Rooms"	Daniel Attias	Nic Pizzolatto	August 2, 2015	2.18
Velcoro swaps information with Semyon and goes to talk to Davis, only to find her dead in her car. Semyon tortures Churchman until he admits that Agronov plans to replace Semyon and that he was working with him, he killed Stan when he was seen talking to Agronov, Agronov is planning a deal with McCandless the next day, and he intentionally gave Semyon bad information regarding Brune's rapist. Semyon kills him, tells his wife Jordan to go underground, and burns down his casino after Agronov announces his plans to take it over. Woodrugh researches the 1992 robbery and discovers that Holloway, Dixon, Caspere, and Lieutenant Kevin Burris were all involved, and that the shootout with Amarilla was orchestrated to get Dixon killed. Bezzerides learns from Machiado that Caspere's favorite prostitute planned to blackmail him over the robbery, and so she was killed in the shed. Velcoro realizes that the Osterman daughter, Laura, was Caspere's secretary under an assumed name. He and Bezzerides confess their mutual attraction and have sex. Woodrugh is blackmailed with pictures of him with Miguel and goes to the ordered meeting spot, learning that Miguel was still working for the security firm, which is now working exclusively for McCandless. Holloway, Woodrugh's blackmailer, demands the documents, but he manages to kill all of the security guards and escape, only to be killed by Burris as he exits the building.
16	8	"Omega Station"	John Crowley	Nic Pizzolatto	August 9, 2015	2.73
Semyon finds Chessani dead in his home. Velcoro and Bezzerides recount their respective formative traumas, his being killing who he thought was Brune's rapist and hers being kidnapped as a child by the man she hallucinated. They realize that Laura's brother Lenny worked on the set the car that transported Caspere was stolen from, and bust into Laura's house to find her restrained, along with Lenny's crow mask. She explains that Lenny accidentally killed Caspere while torturing him for information, and that he has set a meeting with Holloway. Velcoro intercepts Lenny and convinces him to record Holloway confessing to his corruption, but he loses his cool when Holloway reveals that Laura was Caspere's daughter, getting them both killed by Holloway's backup. To get enough money so they can all escape to Venezuela, Velcoro and Semyon kill everyone at Agronov and McCandless' meeting and take their money. As Bezzerides finds Pitlor dead, Velcoro observes Chad at school, carrying the badge. He returns to his car to find it fitted with a transponder, and chooses to drive into the woods rather than risk Bezzerides' life. He attempts to send a final message to Chad before he is killed by Burris, but his phone's poor signal prevents it from going through. The cartel takes Semyon out to the desert and stab him for violating their deal by destroying his casino. He attempts to walk back to civilization but bleeds to death. Some time later, Velcoro is blamed for Davis and Woodrugh's murders, Brune gets a paternity test that confirms Velcoro as Chad's father, Tony becomes mayor, Woodrugh has a highway named in his honor, and Bezzerides lives in Venezuela with her and Velcoro's son, as well as Jordan. They meet with a journalist Velcoro previously attacked for Semyon and give him files that expose the corruption in Vinci.

== Production ==
In January 2014, Pizzolatto signed a two-year contract extension with HBO, effectively renewing the series for two additional seasons. Much like its predecessor, season two of True Detective consists of eight episodes, all written by Pizzolatto. However, the responsibility of directing was assigned to several people; Justin Lin directed the first two episodes, and, in July 2014, William Friedkin was being considered as a director of later episodes. Fukunaga, who directed all of season one, did not return as director; he remains, however, an executive producer, as do McConaughey and Harrelson. Pizzolatto hired fellow novelist Scott Lasser to help break stories for the second half of the season.

Ahead of True Detective's second season, the press publicized rumors that creative differences had fueled personal hostility between Pizzolatto and Fukunaga; the former denied the rumors, while the latter declined to comment. Pizzolatto retained control of the writing process but Fukunaga left, and the second season's eight episodes were instead variously handled among six directors.

In a 2016 interview on KPCC's The Frame, Michael Lombardo, President of Programming at HBO, stated "Our biggest failures — and I don’t know if I would consider True Detective 2 — but when we tell somebody to hit an air date as opposed to allowing the writing to find its own natural resting place, when it’s ready, when it’s baked — we’ve failed." He continued: "I set him [Pizzolatto] up. To deliver, in a very short time frame, something that became very challenging to deliver."

=== Casting ===
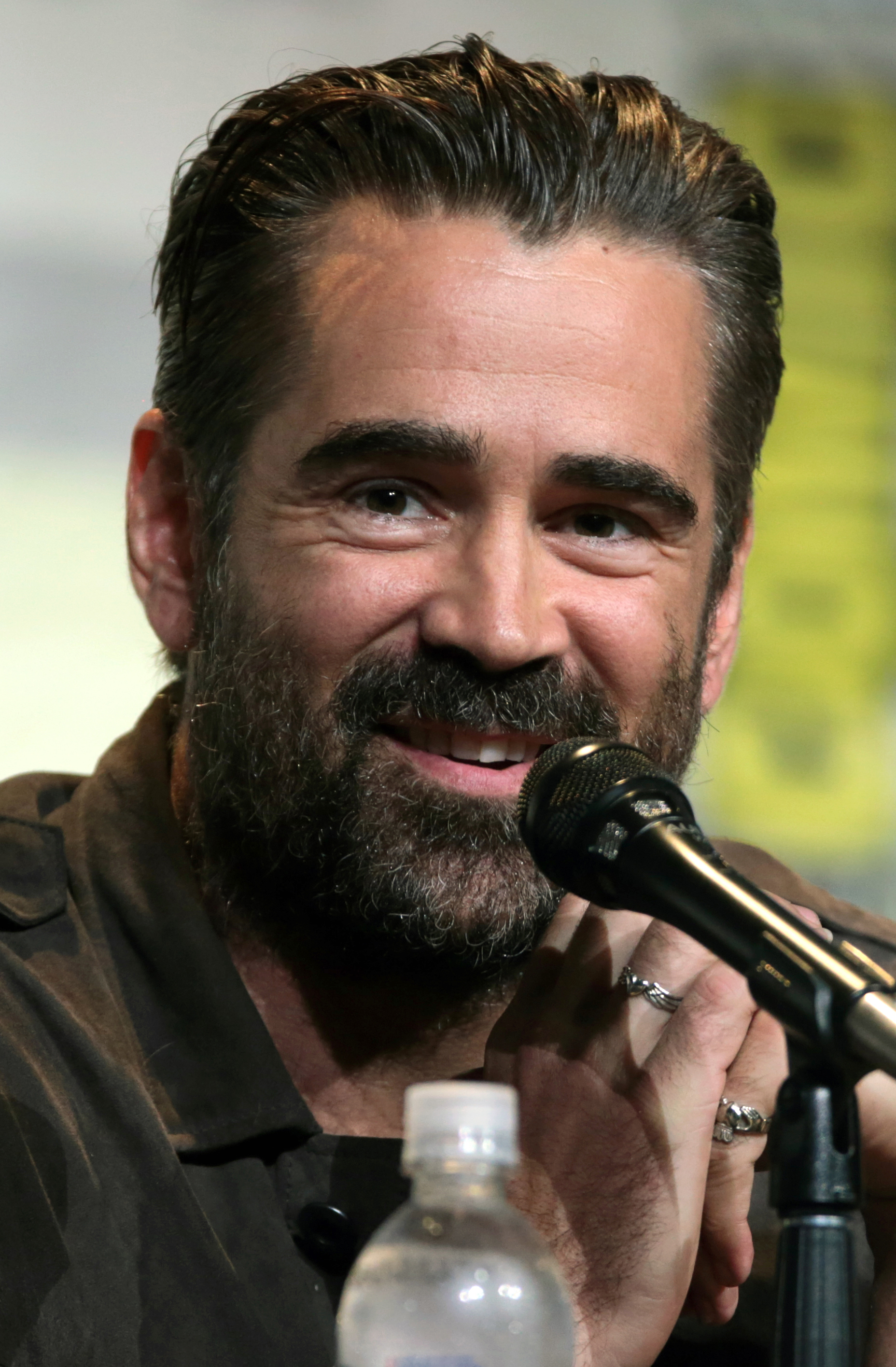
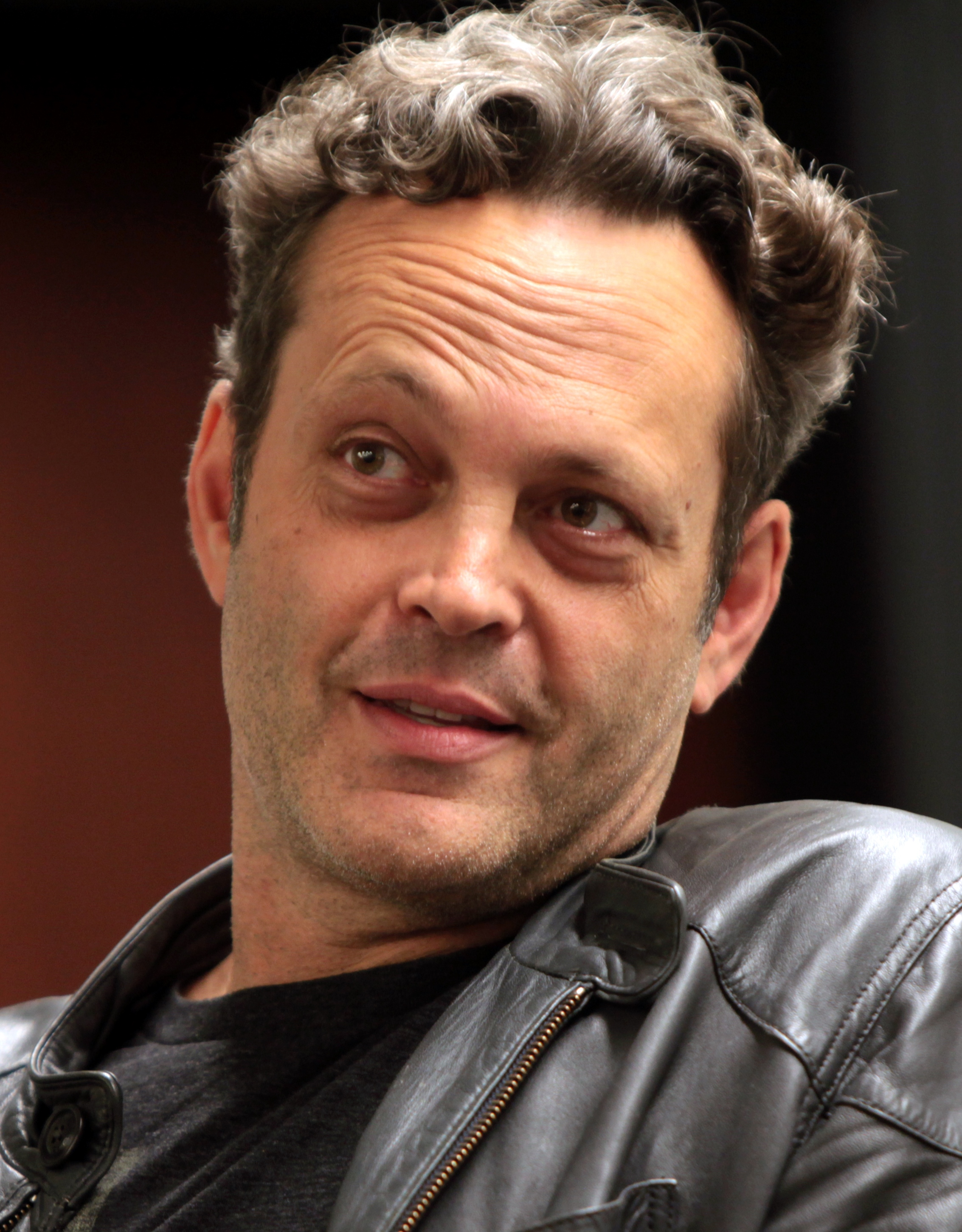
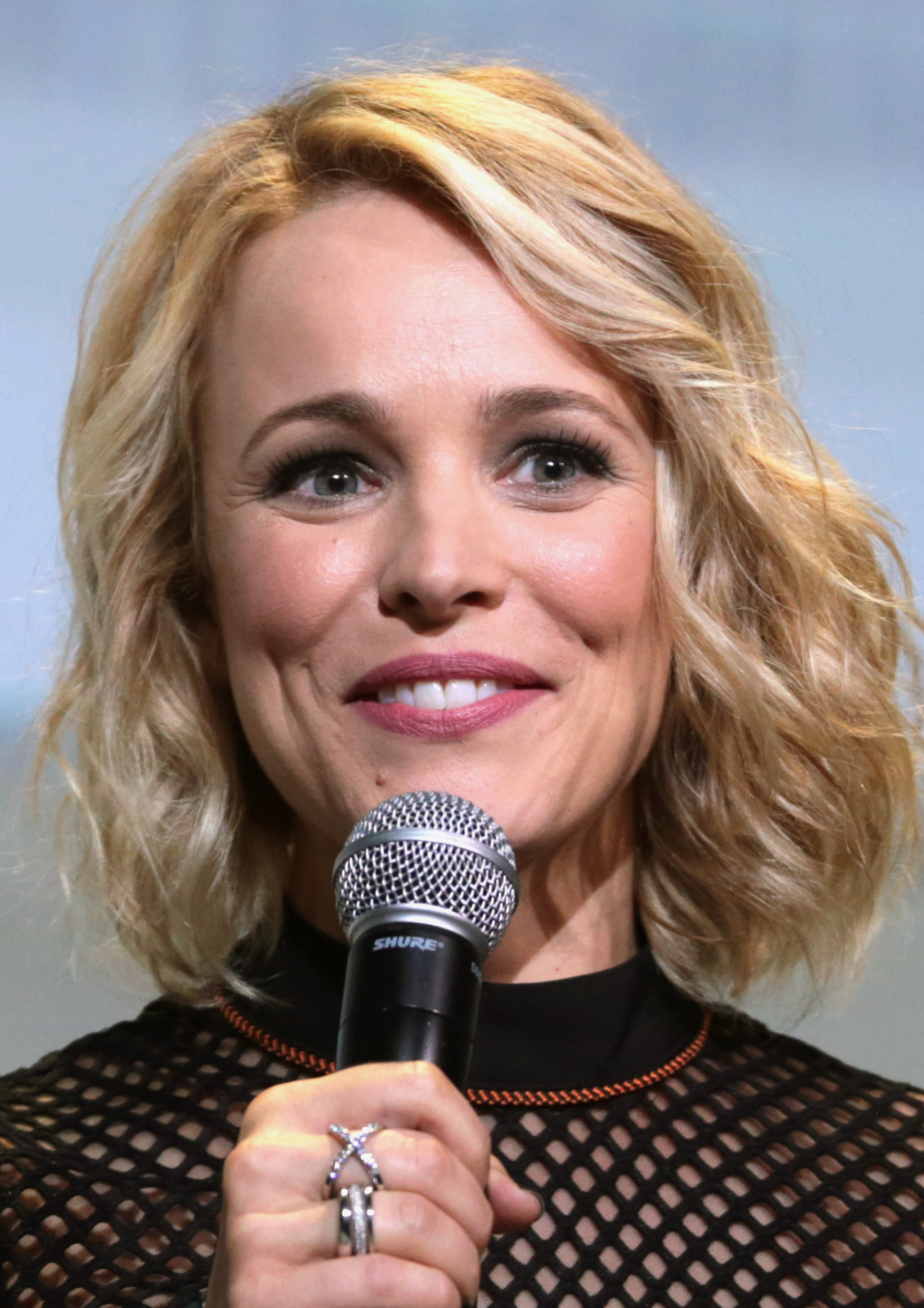
Colin Farrell (left), Vince Vaughn (middle) and Rachel McAdams (right), three of the five stars in the second season of True Detective.

The success of True Detective, and its subsequent renewal, fueled casting rumors in the press. At one point, early media reports named Cate Blanchett, Josh Brolin, Joaquin Phoenix, Garrett Hedlund, Michael Fassbender, Jessica Chastain, Christian Bale, Elisabeth Moss and Brad Pitt to be among a raft of potential candidates for the leads. The season's first significant casting was Colin Farrell as Ray Velcoro, which he revealed in his September 2014 interview with the Sunday World. Vince Vaughn, playing the role of Frank Semyon, became HBO's next important signing toward the end of the month. By November, True Detective's principal cast expanded to include Rachel McAdams, Taylor Kitsch, and Kelly Reilly.

=== Filming ===
California was selected as the setting for the second season. Producers were urged to avoid filming in Los Angeles and, instead, focus on the other regions of the state to "capture a certain psycho-sphere ambiance". Production began in November 2014.

=== Music ===
T Bone Burnett returned as composer for the second season, and the score for the season is more electronic-influenced than the previous season. Burnett noted that the change in landscape, to California, also changed how he wrote the music. Leonard Cohen's "Nevermind," the season two opening theme, is a song off Cohen's 2014 album, Popular Problems. The theme song's lyrics change with every episode, incorporating different verses from Cohen's song. Lera Lynn's music is featured throughout the season, and the song "The Only Thing Worth Fighting For", which she composed with Burnett and Rosanne Cash, is used in the season two trailer. Lynn collaborated with Burnett on writing several original songs for the series, with cues from creator Nic Pizzolatto regarding lyrics and content. Lynn also portrays a bar singer in the season, where several of her songs are used, including "My Least Favorite Life", which was written by Cash.

== Reception ==
=== Critical response ===
True Detective season 2: Critical reception by episode
True Detective season 2 (2015): Percentage of positive critics' reviews tracked by the website Rotten Tomatoes

The second season received mixed reviews. Positive reviews praised the performances of Farrell, McAdams and Kitsch, its cinematography, and action sequences. Alternatively, the season was named one of the worst television programs of 2015, from several news outlets such as Variety, the New York Post, Newsday, and TV Guide, particularly due to the convoluted plot, dialogue, and Pizzolatto's writing.

According to Lindsay Hallam at Senses of Cinema, "many reports on the less well-received second season" asserted that Pizzolatto had "become self-indulgent" due to "the lack of a strong collaborator". Critics of season two—including Timberg and Time magazine's James Poniewozik—faulted what they called an excessive delegation of creative control to Pizzolatto alone, arguing that his responsibility for season one's success had been overestimated under the "auteurist" framework.

On Rotten Tomatoes, the season has a rating of 47%, based on 127 reviews, with an average rating of 6.3/10. The site's critical consensus reads, "Despite some memorably grizzled performances, True Detective's second season is florid to a fault and so unrelentingly grim that it becomes about as much fun as being stuck in L.A. traffic." On Metacritic, the season has a score of 61 out of 100, based on 41 critics, indicating "generally favorable" reviews.

David Hinckley of the New York Daily News gave it a very positive review, and wrote "It's still the kind of show that makes TV viewers reach for phrases like 'golden age of television drama'" and that "the second installment of True Detective goes out of the way not to echo the first." Hank Stuever of The Washington Post gave it a generally positive review, praising the performances, and wrote, "There is something still lugubrious and overwrought about True Detective, but there's also a mesmerizing style to it — it's imperfect, but well made."

A more mixed review came from Brian Lowry of Variety, who wrote "Although generally watchable, the inspiration that turned the first [season] into an obsession for many seems to have drained out of writer Nic Pizzolatto's prose."

=== Accolades ===
For the 6th Critics' Choice Television Awards, Rachel McAdams received a nomination for Best Actress in a Movie Made for Television or Limited Series.

== Home media ==
The second season of True Detective was released on Blu-ray and DVD on January 5, 2016. In addition to the eight episodes, both formats contain bonus content including a making-of featurette of "The Vinci Massacre", interviews with cast and crew, audio commentary for "Down Will Come" by Nic Pizzolatto, Colin Farrell, Vince Vaughn, Taylor Kitsch and Rachel McAdams, and an audio commentary for "Omega Station" by Nic Pizzolatto, Scott Stephens, Colin Farrell and Vince Vaughn.
