= Other Lives (True Detective) =

- True Detective episode
- Episode no.: Season 2 Episode 5
- Directed by: John Crowley
- Written by: Nic Pizzolatto
- Cinematography by: Nigel Bluck
- Editing by: Chris Figler
- Original air date: July 19, 2015
- Running time: 59 minutes

Guest appearances
- Ritchie Coster as Mayor Austin Chessani; Rick Springfield as Dr. Irving Pitlor; W. Earl Brown as Detective Teague Dixon; Abigail Spencer as Gena Brune; Chris Kerson as Nails; C. S. Lee as State Attorney Richard Geldof; Jon Lindstrom as Jacob McCandless; Alain Uy as Ernst Bodine; Adria Arjona as Emily; Yara Martinez as Felicia; Lera Lynn as Singer; Ashley Hinshaw as Lacey Lindel; Molly Hagan as Mrs. Harris; Melinda Page Hamilton as Gena's Attorney; Christopher James Baker as Blake Churchman; James Frain as Lieutenant Kevin Burris; Michael Hyatt as Katherine Davis; Michael Irby as Detective Elvis Ilinca; Gregg Daniel as Judge; Lolita Davidovich as Cynthia Woodrugh; Leven Rambin as Athena Bezzerides; Matt Battaglia as Commander Floyd Heschmeyer; Christian Campbell as Richard Brune; Vinicius Machado as Tony Chessani; Saundra Santiago as Irma; Timothy V. Murphy as Osip Agronov; Chris Butler as Lacey's Attorney; Matt McCoy as Gillett; Mark Berry as Woodrugh's Counsel; Cory Blevins as Moderator; Jeff Doucette as Jeweler; Carla Vila as Danielle Delvayo; Angela Fornero as Tenant; Jennifer Jean Snyder as News Anchor; Beau Berglund as Man #2; Mike Kersey as Man #1; Nick Gracer as Man #3; Benjamín Benítez as Gonzales #1; Robert Renderos as Gonzales #2; Chas Scherer as Loyd

Episode chronology
← Previous "Down Will Come"	Next → "Church in Ruins"
- True Detective (season 2)

"Other Lives" is the fifth episode of the second season of the American anthology crime drama television series True Detective. It is the 13th overall episode of the series and was written by series creator Nic Pizzolatto, and directed by John Crowley. It was first broadcast on HBO in the United States on July 19, 2015.

The season is set in California, and focuses on three detectives, Ray Velcoro (Colin Farrell), Ani Bezzerides (Rachel McAdams) and Paul Woodrugh (Taylor Kitsch), from three cooperating police forces and a criminal-turned-businessman named Frank Semyon (Vince Vaughn) as they investigate a series of crimes they believe are linked to the murder of a corrupt politician. In the episode, the aftermath of the shootout impacts the lives of Velcoro, Bezzerides and Woodrugh, while Semyon keeps expanding his empire and investigating his own henchmen.

According to Nielsen Media Research, the episode was seen by an estimated 2.42 million household viewers and gained a 1.0 ratings share among adults aged 18–49. The episode received mixed reviews from critics, who praised the "soft reboot" and new narrative, while others considered that it arrived too late in the season.

== Plot ==
Two months after the shootout, deemed the "Vinci Massacre" by the media, Attorney General Geldof (C. S. Lee) closes Caspere's case, deeming his death as part of Amarilla's (Cesar Garcia) activities. Geldof also uses the press conference to announce his bid for governor. Semyon (Vince Vaughn) has now moved to a small house in Glendale, struggling to keep his enterprises afloat, while the land deal has been announced without his involvement.

Velcoro (Colin Farrell) has quit the police and now works in private security for Semyon. Lieutenant Burris (James Frain) visits Velcoro and tells him he cannot live in Vinci municipal housing any longer, as he is no longer a detective; he also mentions that the department has learned things about deceased Detective Teague Dixon (W. Earl Brown) but does not elaborate.

Bezzerides (Rachel McAdams) has been demoted, now working at the sheriff's office evidence lock-up. She is forced to attend sexual harassment seminars, where some of her co-workers continue making comments about her. Meanwhile, she covertly continues working on Vera's case. Bezzerides is given a stack of photographs by Vera's sister, found in a safe deposit box that belonged to Vera. The photographs show parties attended by California politicians, as well as Caspere's blue diamonds. She meets Velcoro at Felicia's (Yara Martinez) bar and asks him for help, but he warns her to stay away from the case, as they are no longer detectives.

Woodrugh (Taylor Kitsch) has been promoted to detective in the insurance fraud department and is settling the case with Lacey Lindel (Ashley Hinshaw), while also intending to marry Emily (Adria Arjona), who is now four months pregnant. While visiting his mother Cynthia (Lolita Davidovich), he discovers that she spent the $20,000 cash he brought back from the War in Afghanistan and angrily confronts her as he needed the money for his family. Cynthia admits to using the money but also claims to know about his gay sexual encounters, leading Woodrugh to storm out.

Velcoro fights for Chad's (Trevor Larcom) legal custody and is dismayed when he finds that Gena (Abigail Spencer) has asked the judge for a paternity test. Needing the money, he asks Semyon for a new job and is assigned to watch over his right-hand man, Blake Churchman (Christopher James Baker), as he feels he can't trust him anymore. Velcoro follows Blake, who meets with Dr. Pitlor (Rick Springfield). The two pick up girls at his offices and then deliver them to Osip (Timothy V. Murphy) with the help of Tony Chessani (Vinicius Machado).

Katherine Davis (Michael Hyatt) meets with Velcoro, Woodrugh, and Bezzerides at the site of the Vinci massacre. She tells them that she will be secretly re-opening the Caspere case, as she suspects Geldof is working with Chessani (Ritchie Coster) to help his bid for governor. She convinces Velcoro to join them, intending to help him win legal custody of Chad. Bezzerides and Velcoro are made special investigators in order to assist on the case. Before they depart, Davis also reveals that Gena's rapist was caught via DNA analysis several weeks prior, making Velcoro realize that Semyon lied to him years ago.

At Lux Infinitum, Semyon talks with Jordan (Kelly Reilly) as their relationship seems to be dwindling. She states that for years, she suspected she could be infertile, which explains why they could never have children despite their many tries. This prompts Semyon to spend more time with her as they look for other methods, as well as reflect on his own abusive childhood.

Velcoro confronts Dr. Pitlor for his connections with Chessani and Caspere, brutally attacking him at his office. Pitlor confesses to performing plastic surgery on the girls to make them suitable for parties, which were organized by Chessani and Caspere, with Tony also acting as a pimp. At these parties, Chessani and Caspere would record footage on hard drives in order to gain blackmail evidence on rich and powerful attendees, including rail-line businessman and Catalast president Jacob McCandless (Jon Lindstrom). Pitlor also confirms treating Chessani's previous wife, Helene — Tony and Betty's mother — in a psychiatric hospital; he insinuates that poor treatment by her husband's family led to her suicide.

Needing access to the parties, Bezzerides asks Athena (Leven Rambin) for help getting inside. At the same time, Woodrugh asks gemologists and bench jewelers around Los Angeles about Caspere's blue diamonds. An owner states the diamonds might be stolen and reveals that Detective Dixon (W. Earl Brown) already asked for information regarding the diamonds before his death and even before they discovered the safe deposit box.

Later, Woodrugh and Bezzerides arrive at a house in Guerneville, from where Vera supposedly called before her disappearance. Near the house, they find carrion birds circling overhead, which leads them to a dilapidated shed. Inside the shed, a chair covered in duct tape and blood on the walls insinuate torture having taken place.

In their house, Semyon and Jordan spend some time together when someone aggressively knocks at their door. Semyon procures his gun and answers, finding Velcoro, who needs to talk with him.

== Production ==
=== Development ===
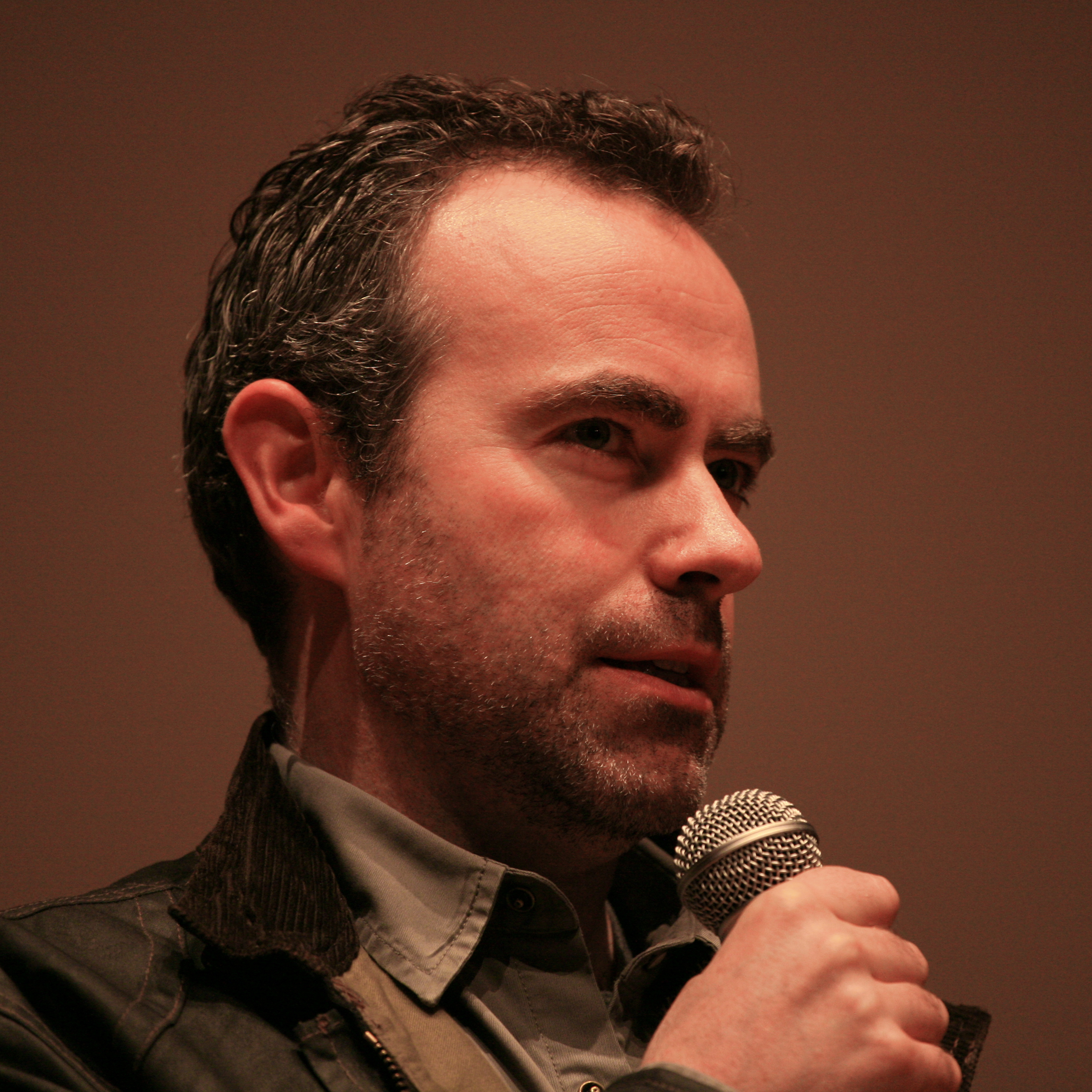
John Crowley directed the episode.

In June 2015, the episode's title was revealed as "Other Lives" and it was announced that series creator Nic Pizzolatto had written the episode while John Crowley had directed it. This was Pizzolatto's thirteenth writing credit, and Crowley's first directing credit.

== Reception ==
=== Viewers ===
The episode was watched by 2.42 million viewers, earning a 1.0 in the 18-49 rating demographics on the Nielson ratings scale. This means that 1 percent of all households with televisions watched the episode. This was a slight increase from the previous episode, which was watched by 2.36 million viewers with a 1.1 in the 18-49 demographics.

=== Critical reviews ===
"Other Lives" received mixed reviews from critics. The review aggregator website Rotten Tomatoes reported a 54% approval rating for the episode, based on 24 reviews, with an average rating of 6.3/10. The site's consensus states: "'Other Lives' succeeds in rebooting the characters of True Detective, but it might come too late in the season to create new tension."

Matt Fowler of IGN gave the episode a "great" 8.2 out of 10 and wrote in his verdict, "While I like the fact that our heroes had to take a step back in order to move forward, and that the dots are finally starting to connect with regards to the larger conspiracy, everything that's coming back is doing so somewhat unspectacularly. We knew the missing girl was a part of this. And Dr. Pitlor. And Dixon. Despite the big action set piece from last week, the swimming pool still needs to be shocked."

Erik Adams of The A.V. Club gave the episode a "C" grade and wrote, "The lead story of the episode is a little bit of history repeating: Just as season one followed the demise of Reggie Ledoux with some fast forwarding and second guessing, season two jumps forward from the so-called 'Vinci massacre' to start raising questions of its own. The circumstances are strikingly similar, but following the first rounds of True Detective and Fargo, the surprise of 'Other Lives' is muted. And with the same thing happening at the same point in the season, it's almost as if the episode is arguing for a do-over on a signature element of season one."

Alan Sepinwall of HitFix wrote, "There are some developments and moments in 'Other Lives' that I found promising, but that I would have found a whole lot more promising if I hadn't made it through the previous four chapters without finding many characters or stories worth caring about." Gwilym Mumford of The Guardian wrote, "Last week's bloody shootout seems to have done the trick: Nic Pizzolatto's faltering drama has burst back into life." Ben Travers of IndieWire gave the episode a "C−" grade and wrote, "We watched a shoddily-constructed hour of television with edits trying to mask bloated dialogue and more unfounded match cuts from convenient props to California's skyline/roads. When (or if) we look back on the season, 'Our Lives' will be the episode we all forget — or at least wish we could."

Jeff Jensen of Entertainment Weekly wrote, "I'm not sure the drama was all that improved, and the dialogue was never more ridiculous, but at least 'Other Lives' left you feeling like you were getting somewhere. Including the end." Aaron Riccio of Slant Magazine wrote, "Ironically, even though 'Other Lives' hints at the different lives its characters could experience at any given moment, it chooses to enmesh them even deeper in the ones they've unwittingly chosen."

Kenny Herzog of Vulture gave the episode a 4 star rating out of 5 and wrote, "The debate that will continue to rage has more to do with how Pizzolatto and his rotating crew of directors (this time noted theater director John W. Crowley) and co-writers have walked the line between subtly reconstituting genre tropes and haphazardly evoking them in earnest. Unless one would rather kibitz with Ani over the merits of length versus girth." Tony Sokol of Den of Geek gave the episode a 4 star rating out of 5 and wrote, "While cops go over the spent shrapnel at the city block-wide crime scene, the surviving squad members are as scattered as the buck shot that knocked Detective Ray Velcoro on his ass at the end of episode 2."

Carissa Pavlica of TV Fanatic gave the episode a 4 star rating out of 5 and wrote, "Overall, it's not easy to care too deeply about a case about corporate big wigs, sexual perversion and getting themselves caught on camera turning to murder, diamonds and collusion. It's a lot to drink in, so tying it in well with the protagonists is really important. They just started doing that with any meaning during this hour. Can it all come together in three more episodes? We'll find out." Shane Ryan of Paste gave the episode a 5.9 out of 10 and wrote, "True Detective has become a one-trick pony, and that's too bad, but man... what a trick."
