= The Western Book of the Dead =

- True Detective episode
- Episode no.: Season 2 Episode 1
- Directed by: Justin Lin
- Written by: Nic Pizzolatto
- Cinematography by: Nigel Bluck
- Editing by: Alex Hall
- Original air date: June 21, 2015
- Running time: 60 minutes

Guest appearances
- Ritchie Coster as Mayor Austin Chessani; David Morse as Eliot Bezzerides; Christopher James Baker as Blake Churchman; Chris Kerson as Nails; Ronnie Gene Blevins as Stan; Andy Mackenzie as Ivar; Timothy V. Murphy as Osip Agronov; Leven Rambin as Athena Bezzerides; W. Earl Brown as Detective Teague Dixon; Afemo Omilami as Police Chief Holloway; James Frain as Lieutenant Kevin Burris; Michael Irby as Detective Elvis Ilinca; Matt Battaglia as Commander Floyd Heschmeyer; Adria Arjona as Emily; Yara Martinez as Felicia; Lera Lynn as Singer; Molly Hagan as Mrs. Harris; Ashley Hinshaw as Lacey Lindel; Agnes Olech as Veronica Chessani; Christian Campbell as Richard Brune; Trevor Larcom as Chad Velcoro; Courtney Halverson as Erica Jonson; Jon Lindstrom as Jacob McCandless; Chet Grissom as Bart Sallis; Alain Uy as Ernst Bodine; Carla Vila as Danielle Delvayo; Stevin Knight as Dan Howser; Riley Smith as Steve Mercer; Gia Mora as Mrs. Conroy; Cooper Roth as Aspen Conroy; Drew Waters as Paul Trevor; Wilke Itzin as Webcam Owner; Charles Maceo as California Highway Patrol Police #1; Jamison Jones as Will Davidson; Anjul Nigam as Ventura County Medical Examiner; Solomon Shiv as Michael Bulgari; Coley Mustafa Speaks as California Highway Patrol Police #2; Ashli Haynes as Webcam Girl #1; Rosalie McIntire as Webcam Girl #2; Lidia Porto as Panticapaeum Maid #1; Ivet Corvea as Panticapaeum Maid #2; Avi Bernard as Male Deputy #1; Brett Edwards as Male Deputy #2

Episode chronology
← Previous "Form and Void"	Next → "Night Finds You"
- True Detective (season 2)

"The Western Book of the Dead" is the first episode of the second season of the American anthology crime drama television series True Detective. It is the 9th overall episode of the series and was written by series creator Nic Pizzolatto, and directed by Justin Lin. It was first broadcast on HBO in the United States on June 21, 2015.

The season is set in California, and focuses on three detectives, Ray Velcoro (Colin Farrell), Ani Bezzerides (Rachel McAdams) and Paul Woodrugh (Taylor Kitsch), from three cooperating police forces and a criminal-turned-businessman named Frank Semyon (Vince Vaughn) as they investigate a series of crimes they believe are linked to the murder of a corrupt politician.

According to Nielsen Media Research, the episode was seen by an estimated 3.17 million household viewers and gained a 1.4 ratings share among adults aged 18–49. The episode received mixed-to-positive reviews from critics, who praised the cast, cinematography, and Lin's directing. However, some expressed criticism for the writing, with many criticizing the "over-stuffed" characters and pacing.

== Plot ==
In Vinci, a Californian industrial town on the edge of Los Angeles, police detective Ray Velcoro (Colin Farrell) drops off his son Chad at school. He is later interviewed by an attorney regarding his ex-wife, who was raped years ago, causing uncertainty about whether Ray is Chad's father. Ray refuses to get a paternity test, claiming that Chad is his son, and states that the man who raped his ex-wife was never found. In reality, he was contacted years ago by corrupt businessman Frank Semyon (Vince Vaughn), who gave him the information he needed to find the man. Semyon has since kept Velcoro in his debt in the years that have passed.

As Vinci plans for a real estate development near a new high-speed rail line, Semyon, who is now a white-collar criminal, is working on the deal in order to present it to Russian oligarch Osip Agronov (Timothy V. Murphy). Semyon's partner, city manager Ben Caspere, is set to present the plans and leaves his house. During this time, the local newspaper starts reporting possible corruption cases in the city.

Meanwhile, Ventura County Sheriff's Office CID agent Antigone "Ani" Bezzerides (Rachel McAdams) and her team conduct a raid on a suspected illegal brothel, which turns out to be a legal porn studio. During the raid, she discovers that her sister Athena (Leven Rambin) is working there as a webcam model. While foreclosing a Ventura County home, Bezzerides is asked by a woman to find the woman's missing sister, Vera. She and her partner Elvis Ilinca (Michael Irby) visit a New Age meditation center run by Bezzerides' father, Eliot (David Morse), who states that Vera used to work there.

On the day of the presentation, Caspere goes missing and Velcoro is instructed to investigate his whereabouts. Velcoro and Detective Teague Dixon (W. Earl Brown) check Caspere's house, which is filled with erotic art and evidence pointing to a kidnapping.

In another part of Los Angeles, California Highway Patrol officer Paul Woodrugh (Taylor Kitsch) stops a car for speeding. The driver, troubled actress Lacey Lindel (Ashley Hinshaw), unsuccessfully tries to seduce him in order to avoid a ticket. She later files a complaint against him, claiming sexual misconduct, and Woodrugh is put on paid leave while the case is investigated. He goes home to his girlfriend Emily (Adria Arjona) and they have sex, with Woodrugh hiding the fact that he snuck away to the bathroom to take Viagra beforehand.

As Osip arrives in Vinci, Semyon is forced to hold the presentation without Caspere in front of his associates and his wife, Jordan (Kelly Reilly). Osip is interested but wants to wait on the deal until Caspere arrives, as he is not fully confident about Semyon's ability to deliver the deal. Later, Semyon orders Velcoro to intimidate Dan Howser, a local journalist, to stop writing about corruption in Vinci, and for Velcoro to retrieve any incriminating evidence about Semyon and his associates.

Velcoro later visits his son at school and sees that he is not wearing his expensive new sneakers; Chad states that a bully named Aspen Conroy broke into his locker and damaged them. Velcoro uses his police contacts to find Conroy's home address and visits the house that night, brutally attacking Conroy's father in front of him and threatening to kill his parents if he ever bullies Chad or any kid ever again. Velcoro then meets with Semyon at his friend Felicia's (Yara Martinez) bar to give him Howser's evidence, revealing Semyon as the one who sent the attorney to help Velcoro gain custody of Chad.

While lying in bed, Woodrugh is questioned by Emily about his scars, and tells her that they are from a time before he joined the U.S. Army but does not reveal exactly what caused them. He leaves the house and goes driving on his motorcycle with no helmet. He turns off the motorcycle's headlights and exceeds the speed limit, but grows timid. He soon turns the lights back on and pulls up to the side of the road, where he sees a man sitting on a bench. Upon further inspection, he discovers that the man is Ben Caspere, who has had his eyes burned out with hydrochloric acid. Woodrugh reports the body and the authorities, including Velcoro and Bezzerides, arrive, meeting together for the first time.

== Production ==
=== Development ===
In January 2014, Nic Pizzolatto signed a two-year contract extension with HBO, effectively renewing the series for two additional seasons. Much like its predecessor, the season consists of eight episodes, all written by Pizzolatto. In September 2014, Justin Lin joined the series to direct the first two episodes of the season.

In June 2015, the episode's title was revealed as "The Western Book of the Dead" and it was announced that series creator Nic Pizzolatto had written the episode while Justin Lin had directed it. This was Pizzolatto's ninth writing credit, and Lin's first directing credit. The title is based on a book of the same name by Alfred Schmielewski, who went by the name Yogi A.S. Narayana.

=== Casting ===
In September 2014, Colin Farrell announced that he would join the series, while doing an interview with the Sunday World. By the end of the month, Vince Vaughn joined the series. In November 2014, Rachel McAdams, Taylor Kitsch, and Kelly Reilly were announced as the remaining main cast members.

== Reception ==
=== Viewers ===
The episode was watched by 3.17 million viewers, earning a 1.4 in the 18-49 rating demographics on the Nielsen ratings scale. This means that 1.4 percent of all households with televisions watched the episode. This was a 10% decrease from the previous episode, which was watched by 3.52 million viewers with a 1.6 in the 18-49 demographics. But it was a 36% increase from the previous season premiere, which was watched by 2.33 million viewers with a 1.0 in the 18-49 demographics.

=== Critical reviews ===
"The Western Book of the Dead" received mixed-to-positive reviews from critics. The review aggregator website Rotten Tomatoes reported a 74% approval rating for the episode, based on 23 reviews, with an average rating of 6.7/10. The site's consensus states: "Strong performances by the season two True Detective cast make for a compelling hour of television, even when the story takes a little too long to get going."

Roth Cornet of IGN gave the episode a "good" 7.5 out of 10 and wrote in her verdict, "By its very nature True Detective Season 2 is poised to be compared with its predecessor. It also cannot become the unexpected hit of the season... because we are expecting it. We're looking for it. Some would defy it to be as riveting as those first few episodes of Season 1. This is not the mesmerizing tale of two diametrically opposed men who become bound by blood and the search for honor, though. The debut episode of True Detective's second season is burdened by an overly complex plot and weakened by simplified character sketches. However, in total this is an engaging enough detective series that has the potential to become more so."

Erik Adams of The A.V. Club gave the episode a "B−" grade and wrote, "'The Western Book Of The Dead' excels at setting up a mystery but lacks for satisfying drama, if only because these characters aren't so interesting on their own." Britt Hayes of Screen Crush wrote, "'The Western Book of the Dead' isn't an incredibly strong episode, but it is a rather solid introduction to the dark and grimy world of Season 2 — and it firmly establishes itself as independent from its predecessor in the process. To its credit, the premiere (and especially the last few moments) leave me wanting to know and see more."

Alan Sepinwall of HitFix wrote, "This episode on a whole felt a lot more like a lot of other crime shows, albeit with a great cast and Pizzolatto's brand of dialogue." Gwilym Mumford of The Guardian wrote, "For so much of this episode, the connective tissue between this quartet remains hidden, as if writer Nic Pizzolatto is happy just to wallow in the murk and misery of their circumstances." Ben Travers of IndieWire gave the episode a "B−" grade and wrote, "'The Western Book of the Dead' is far from a perfect episode of television, but it also shouldn't scare off any viewers who didn't expect lightning to strike twice."

Jeff Jensen of Entertainment Weekly wrote, "We have a three-headed narrative, pocked with vice and steeped in themes of sin, penance, and flailing redemption. This year's collection of characters and the storytelling don't capture my imagination the way Rust Cohle, Marty Hart, and the time-toggling, unreliable narrator yarn-spinning did last year. So we hope-watch, to borrow from Alan Sepinwall. May the season catch fire, or I'll be as sad as Colin Farrell's droopstache." Aaron Riccio of Slant Magazine wrote, "As the camera zooms out at the close of 'The Western Book of the Dead', the three officers stand triangularly around the body and look at one another. It feels like an opportunity not just to be seen, but to change the way they're seen. It is, pretentious as it may seem, a chance to live anew."

Kenny Herzog of Vulture gave the episode a 3 star rating out of 5 and wrote, "This True Detective introduces us to ostensible protagonists even further removed from their humanity than Rust Cohle or Marty Hart, with that much more work to do if there's a chance at redemption. It's a lot like casework." Tony Sokol of Den of Geek gave the episode a 4 star rating out of 5 and wrote, "True Detective is art. Sure, this season is going to be a police procedural devoid of the mystical mayhem that made the debut an instant classic. But we are going to see procedures we don’t get on other shows. It's just deeper. It's a novel onscreen. You can almost hear the click of a keyboard as the camera fades take the place of commas and periods."

Carissa Pavlica of TV Fanatic gave the episode a 4.3 star rating out of 5 and wrote, "We couldn't ask for a better cast of actors to embody the characters introduced in 'The Western Book of the Dead'. They are some of the very best of our generation. Whether they'll find the same simpatico rhythm that Rust Cohle and Marty Hart found by the end of Season 1 remains to be seen, but all of the elements are certainly within this group for magic to happen." Shane Ryan of Paste gave the episode a 7.8 out of 10 and wrote, "Of course, the rawness of tone persists, and it makes 'The Western Book of the Dead' a compelling hour of television. I just hope that as we dig into this world, we move past the stylistic bag of tricks so expertly provided by director Justin Lin. At some point, we need to hit a foundation."
