= Down Will Come =

- True Detective episode
- Episode no.: Season 2 Episode 4
- Directed by: Jeremy Podeswa
- Written by: Nic Pizzolatto; Scott Lasser
- Cinematography by: Nigel Bluck
- Editing by: Alex Hall; Byron Smith
- Original air date: July 12, 2015
- Running time: 55 minutes

Guest appearances
- David Morse as Eliot Bezzerides; Leven Rambin as Athena Bezzerides; Ritchie Coster as Mayor Austin Chessani; Emily Rios as Betty Chessani; W. Earl Brown as Detective Teague Dixon; Afemo Omilami as Police Chief Holloway; James Frain as Lieutenant Kevin Burris; Alex Fernandez as James O'Neal; Michael Irby as Detective Elvis Ilinca; Christopher James Baker as Blake Churchman; Chris Kerson as Nails; Andy Mackenzie as Ivar; Arthur Darbinyan as Leonid; Jack Topalian as Armin; Adria Arjona as Emily; Gabriel Luna as Miguel Gilb; Yara Martinez as Felicia; Lera Lynn as Singer; Allel Aimiche as Luca Reles; Abigail Spencer as Gena Brune; Trevor Larcom as Chad Velcoro; Alain Uy as Ernst Bodine; Travis Hammer as California EPA Agent; David Denman as Malkin; David Saucedo as Gardener; Christopher Aguilar as Charlene; Cesar Garcia as Ledo Amarilla; Jerry Hauck as Pawn Shop Owner; Melissa Center as Reporter #1; Steven Ellison as Reporter #2; Sara Welch as Reporter #3; Diane Mizota as Field Reporter

Episode chronology
← Previous "Maybe Tomorrow"	Next → "Other Lives"
- True Detective (season 2)

"Down Will Come" is the fourth episode of the second season of the American anthology crime drama television series True Detective. It is the 12th overall episode of the series and was written by series creator Nic Pizzolatto and Scott Lasser, and directed by Jeremy Podeswa. It was first broadcast on HBO in the United States on July 12, 2015.

The season is set in California, and focuses on three detectives, Ray Velcoro (Colin Farrell), Ani Bezzerides (Rachel McAdams) and Paul Woodrugh (Taylor Kitsch), from three cooperating police forces and a criminal-turned-businessman named Frank Semyon (Vince Vaughn) as they investigate a series of crimes they believe are linked to the murder of a corrupt politician. In the episode, Velcoro, Bezzerides and Woodrugh find a possible connection to Caspere's murder and lead a raid for answers. Meanwhile, Semyon starts to rebuild his empire.

According to Nielsen Media Research, the episode was seen by an estimated 2.36 million household viewers and gained a 1.1 ratings share among adults aged 18–49. The episode received mixed reviews from critics; while critics praised the climactic shootout sequence, others found it jarring on the tone of the series, as well as criticizing the writing, lack of character development and pacing.

== Plot ==
Velcoro (Colin Farrell) and Bezzerides (Rachel McAdams) send the burnt Cadillac to a repair shop and discuss corruption in Vinci. Meanwhile, Woodrugh (Taylor Kitsch) finds that he has spent the night with Miguel Glib (Gabriel Luna), but does not remember what happened. He leaves the apartment and Glib chides him for not being honest with himself. When Woodrugh leaves, he sees that his motorcycle has been stolen, and is also harassed by reporters regarding the Lacey Lindel incident and his time with Black Mountain.

At his home, Semyon (Vince Vaughn) argues with his wife Jordan (Kelly Reilly), refusing to consider adopting a child. Semyon also begins rebuilding his criminal empire by contacting old properties he owned, including a low-income housing unit and the nightclub Lux Infinitum, as well as starting business with local drug suppliers.

Velcoro and Bezzerides follow Chessani's daughter Betty (Emily Rios) to a hookah lounge and ask her about Caspere. Betty reveals that she did not know Caspere well and that her mother, a schizophrenic, killed herself while being a patient of Dr. Pitlor (Rick Springfield). She warns Velcoro and Bezzerides that her father is a "very bad person" before hurriedly departing.

Velcoro and Bezzerides then visit Eliot (David Morse) at the Good People meditation center. Eliot recognizes Caspere, Pitlor, and Mayor Austin Chessani's father, Theo, as former center visitors in the 1980s. Afterward, Velcoro and Bezzerides drive to Fresno in an area Caspere frequented before his death. They are led to vast tracts of land contaminated by the heavy metals dumped from decades of mining. An EPA agent meets with Velcoro and Bezzerides and states that the land has been sold in droves, as the farmland is now useless.

Meanwhile, Woodrugh and Dixon (W. Earl Brown) track a Cartier watch that belonged to Caspere to an L.A. pawn shop; a tape reveals that Irina Rulfo, the girlfriend of convicted felon Ledo Amarilla (Cesar Garcia), pawned the watch. It is suspected that Rulfo was an escort of Caspere's. The team plans a raid on Amarilla's drug den. Velcoro shares this information with Semyon, who hypothesizes that Caspere did not have his money for the land deal in the first place. Semyon then asks Velcoro to quit the police force and join his criminal enterprise; Velcoro rebuffs him. Later, Velcoro secretly visits Chad (Trevor Larcom), giving him his grandfather's (Fred Ward) badge.

Bezzerides visits her sister Athena (Leven Rambin) and discusses their deceased mother; Athena mentions orgies that her colleagues frequent upstate. When Bezzerides arrives at the Ventura County CID station, she finds out she has been suspended, as Steve Mercer (Riley Smith) has filed a sexual harassment complaint. However, she is still allowed to work the Caspere case as a special investigator for the state.

Woodrugh talks with Emily (Adria Arjona) at a diner to talk about his problems and is surprised when she reveals she is pregnant. Woodrugh suggests they should marry, proclaiming his love for her.

Velcoro, Bezzerides, and Woodrugh gear up for the raid, and the task force reunites outside Amarilla's warehouse. However, they are seen by Amarilla's henchmen and a gunfight ensues. During the shootout, the bullets hit the building, which is revealed to be a meth lab, inadvertently causing a massive explosion. In the chaos, many police officers are killed, including Dixon.

Bezzerides enters the building to catch Amarilla, who escapes in an SUV. The SUV runs over many civilians and then crashes into a city bus. Amarilla and his gang leave the SUV to start another shootout, killing civilians. Velcoro, Woodrugh, and Bezzerides close in on the gang and manage to kill most of them. Amarilla then holds a hostage at gunpoint and executes him, prompting Velcoro and Woodrugh to gun Amarilla down. Velcoro, Bezzerides, and Woodrugh then stare in horror at the number of police officers, gangbangers, and civilians killed just as more police units arrive.

== Production ==
=== Development ===
In June 2015, the episode's title was revealed as "Down Will Come" and it was announced that series creator Nic Pizzolatto and Scott Lasser had written the episode while Jeremy Podeswa had directed it. This was Pizzolatto's twelfth writing credit, Lasser's first writing credit, and Podeswa's first directing credit.

== Reception ==
=== Viewers ===
The episode was watched by 2.36 million viewers, earning a 1.1 in the 18-49 rating demographics on the Nielson ratings scale. This means that 1.1 percent of all households with televisions watched the episode. This was a 10% decrease from the previous episode, which was watched by 2.62 million viewers with a 1.1 in the 18-49 demographics.

=== Critical reviews ===
"Down Will Come" received mixed reviews from critics. The review aggregator website Rotten Tomatoes reported a 54% approval rating for the episode, based on 26 reviews, with an average rating of 6.83/10. The site's consensus states: "Though the final scene of True Detective's 'Down Will Come' was spectacular, the events hardly felt earned after a brooding, clunky hour of storytelling."

Roth Cornet of IGN gave the episode a "good" 7.5 out of 10 and wrote in her verdict, "At the mid-way point, True Detective has become far more a series about legacy and paying for past sins than a crime drama set in a gritty real-world setting."

Erik Adams of The A.V. Club gave the episode a "B−" grade and wrote, "The amount of fire they draw at the end of the episode suggests that they're either getting too close to the truth, or they were set up by someone trying to protect the truth. The retaliatory assault sends a message, loud and clear — like an SUV slamming into a city bus, the sounds of 'Whoa, cool!' and 'Whoa, really?' resounding through the streets."

Alan Sepinwall of HitFix wrote, "The one potential bonus of the insane level of that shootout is that it almost certainly has to blow up the structure of the show as it's been struggling to work so far. Whether or not any of the survivors actually lose their jobs over this, it's hard to imagine the task force staying in place, and I'm expecting some kind of notable change in the status quo. Of course, the first season grew a little weaker as we began jumping through time (and as Rust and Marty stopped narrating the action), but we can hope for the inverse of that. Maybe." Gwilym Mumford of The Guardian wrote, "At the halfway point of this disappointing second season, so much remains a blur – to paraphrase Frank Semyon, someone needs to hit the warp drive." Ben Travers of IndieWire gave the episode a "B" grade and wrote, "Now halfway through Season 2, an enticing ending seems far more likely than it did two episodes prior, and that's in part due to the balance between character study and cop drama he's found in recent weeks. We're equally engaged with each element right now, and there are still plenty of possibilities for what's next in both stories. As for now, I'll happily take a little action paired with a lot of plot advancement before looking forward to what comes next."

Jeff Jensen of Entertainment Weekly wrote, "The show's fourth hour fails to connect, despite ending with a blood-pumping shoot-out." Aaron Riccio of Slant Magazine wrote, "Good and evil have often been described as two sides of the coin that is humanity, and 'Down Will Come' certainly puts that theory into practice. As the title's play on words suggests, evil things are all but guaranteed to fall upon us, as cyclical as the physical forces that bring dawn (or light) to each new day."

Kenny Herzog of Vulture gave the episode a 3 star rating out of 5 and wrote, "Who these people are, where they come from, what they want it to mean, and what they want for the future — it's all on the line now. It's gut-check time, which is when True Detective is at its best." Tony Sokol of Den of Geek gave the episode a 4 star rating out of 5 and wrote, "The labored post-traumatic stressed breathing of Ani Bezzerides, Detective Ray Velcoro and Officer Paul Woodrough at the end of tonight's episode is their minds getting around the idea that they sidestepped a steamroller that they set in motion that caused an unexplainable amount of collateral damage."

TV Fanatic gave the episode a 4.2 star rating out of 5 and wrote, "We had to wade through a lot of emotional angst, dark looks and procedural plot points before getting to the explosive last few minutes of 'Down Will Come'. I'd say it was worth it." Shane Ryan of Paste gave the episode an 8.5 out of 10 and wrote, "The special feeling many of us associate with season one came about because of the controlled way the entire True Detective team deployed philosophy. They reined in the writer's worst impulses, and the impact, when it came, was precise and devastating. This time, left to his own devices and with the kind of individual mandate you rarely see in television, Pizzolatto has made use of his full philosophical arsenal. It's still effective when it hits, but too often, it works like a grenade that he drops at his own feet."
