= A Rising Tide =

- Directed by: Ben Hickernell
- Written by: Ben Hickernell
- Produced by: Kristin Fairweather; Daryl Freimark; Ben Hickernell
- Starring: Hunter Parrish; Ashley Hinshaw; Tim Daly
- Cinematography: Jimmy Lee Phelan
- Edited by: Garrett Tezanos
- Music by: Ronen Landa
- Production companies: Fair Weather Pictures; Reconstruction Pictures; Hardball Entertainment
- Release date: May 29, 2015
- Running time: 98 minutes
- Country: United States
- Language: English

A Rising Tide is a 2015 American romantic drama film starring Hunter Parrish, Ashley Hinshaw and Tim Daly.

== Plot ==
After his family restaurant in Atlantic City is destroyed by Hurricane Sandy, a young chef, Sam Rama, must take on new responsibilities.

== Cast ==
- Hunter Parrish as Sam
- Ashley Hinshaw as Sarah
- Tim Daly as Tom Blake
- Jonathan Togo as Roger
- Nana Visitor as Eva
- Victor Slezak as Alek Rama
