= Ashley Hinshaw =

American actress (born 1988)

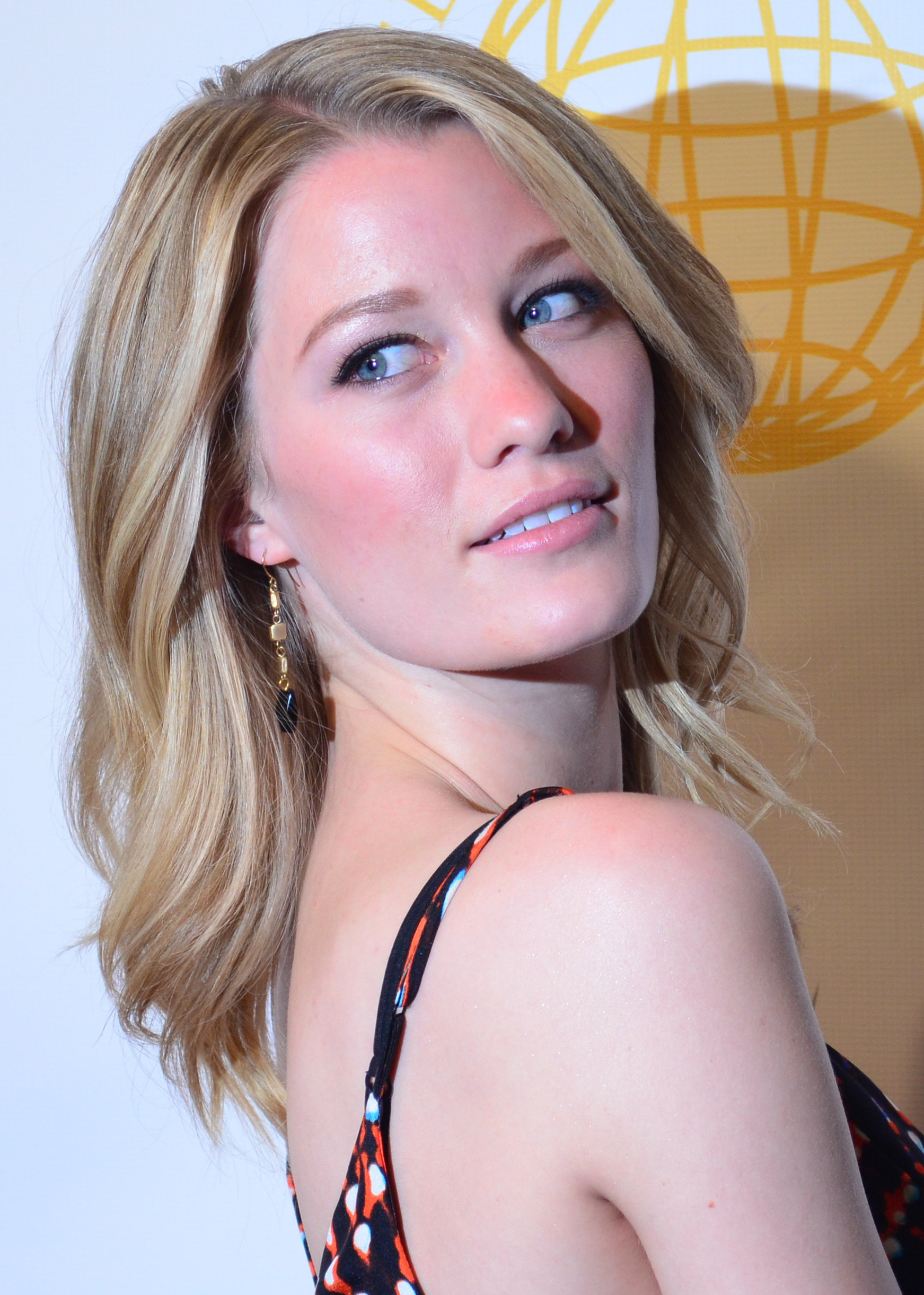
- Hinshaw in 2014
- Born: December 11, 1988 (age 37); La Porte, Indiana, U.S.
- Occupations: Actress, model
- Years active: 2009–present
- Spouse: Topher Grace (m. 2016)
- Children: 3

Ashley Hinshaw Grace (née Hinshaw; born December 11, 1988) is an American retired actress. She is known for her leading role in the 2012 film About Cherry, and for her role in the 2016 Crackle television series StartUp.

== Early life ==
Ashley Hinshaw was born in La Porte, Indiana to Chris and Craig Hinshaw. Since the age of nine, she auditioned and participated in several children's plays and youth theatre. Hinshaw began modeling in her local hometown pageant (Miss Maple City Pageant and Talent Competition) at the age of 13, where she won in beauty and photogenic for 13- to 16-year-olds and talent for 8- to 14-year-olds. In 2003, Hinshaw won third in the Queen's Court competition and second in photogenic competition in the Miss Indiana American Junior Teen Pageant. Hinshaw then went on to participate in the National Miss American Coed Pageant for the Miss American Junior Teen category at the age of 14. When she was 16, Hinshaw moved to New York to begin her modeling career.

== Career ==
Hinshaw first started modeling in pageants in 2002, where she participated in the Miss Indiana Junior Teen competition. As a model, Hinshaw has appeared in an advertising campaign for Abercrombie & Fitch. Her experience as a model led to her judging a beauty pageant on the MTV reality TV series Made in 2008. A year later Hinshaw pursued an acting career and landed a guest stint on The CW Teen Drama series Gossip Girl as herself. Hinshaw auditioned for a role in the proposed spin-off series to Gossip Girl, Valley Girls, which The CW did not pick up. Hinshaw has since appeared in guest roles on Fringe and The Glades.

In June 2010, Hinshaw was confirmed to star in the high school comedy film LOL, an American remake of the 2008 French film, playing the role of Emily. Production began in August 2010 in Paris and Grosse Pointe, and the film was released on a limited basis in the United States in May 2012. In November 2010, Hinshaw was announced as a star in the independent thriller film Rites of Passage alongside Christian Slater. The film was released straight to DVD on October 16, 2012.

In May 2011, Hinshaw was cast as the lead in the independent drama film About Cherry alongside Heather Graham, James Franco and Dev Patel. Hinshaw portrays Angelina, a troubled young woman who comes to San Francisco and joins the porn industry. Filming began in July 2011, and the film premiered at the 2012 Berlin International Film Festival. In 2011, Hinshaw joined the cast of the superhero film Chronicle (2012). She played Casey Letter, a blogger who regularly carries her camera with her.

Hinshaw appeared in six of the ten episodes of the first season of the 2016 Crackle web series StartUp. Since 2017, Hinshaw has been credited using her married name Ashley Grace.

From 2017 to 2018, she recurred on the E! drama series The Arrangement in the recurring role of Lisbeth. In 2018 she wrote and directed her first short, titled Hunter Gatherer, a socially conscious dramatic piece.

== Personal life ==
Hinshaw started dating actor Topher Grace in January 2014, and they became engaged in January 2015. On May 29, 2016, Grace and Hinshaw married near Santa Barbara, California. They have three children, including a daughter born in November 2017 and one child born in 2020.

In May 2023, she graduated from the University of Southern California with a master's degree in social work.

== Filmography ==
=== Film ===
Film
Year	Title	Role	Notes
2011	Rites of Passage	Sandee	Direct-to-video film
2011	The Death and Return of Superman	Power Girl	Short film
2012	Chronicle	Casey Letter	
2012	LOL	Emily	
2012	The Hungover Games	N/A	Short film
2012	About Cherry	Angelina / Cherry	
2013	+1	Jill	
2013	Snake and Mongoose	Lynn Prudhomme	
2013	The Incident	Holly	Short film
2014	The Pyramid	Dr. Nora Holden	
2014	Goodbye to All That	Mildred	
2015	A Rising Tide	Sarah	
2016	The Grounds	Julie	
2016	You're Killing Me Susana	Irene	Spanish title: Me estás matando Susana
2018	Hunter Gatherer	Rose	Short film (also director and writer)

=== Television ===
Television
Year	Title	Role	Notes
2009	Gossip Girl	Herself	Episode: "Reversals of Fortune"
2009	Fringe	Blonde	Episode: "Midnight"
2011	The Glades	Charlene Turner	Episode: "Moonlighting"
2012	Tall Hot Blonde	Katie Brooks	Television movie
2013	Enlightened	Danielle	Episode: "Higher Power"
2013	The League	Rachel	Episode: "The Near Death Flex-perience"
2014	True Blood	Bridgette	4 episodes
2015	Agent Carter	Colleen O'Brien	Episode: "Now is Not the End"
2015	Workaholics	Hilary Winthrop	Episode: "Wedding Thrashers"
2015	True Detective	Lacey Lindel	Episodes: "The Western Book of the Dead", "Other Lives"
2016	Cooper Barrett's Guide to Surviving Life	Paige	Episode: "How to Survive Dating"
2016–2017	StartUp	Taylor	Main role (season 1)
2017	Chicago Med	Melody Sayers	Episode: "Lose Yourself"; as Ashley Grace
2017–2018	The Arrangement	Lisbeth	Recurring role; as Ashley Grace
