= Jon Lindstrom =

American actor

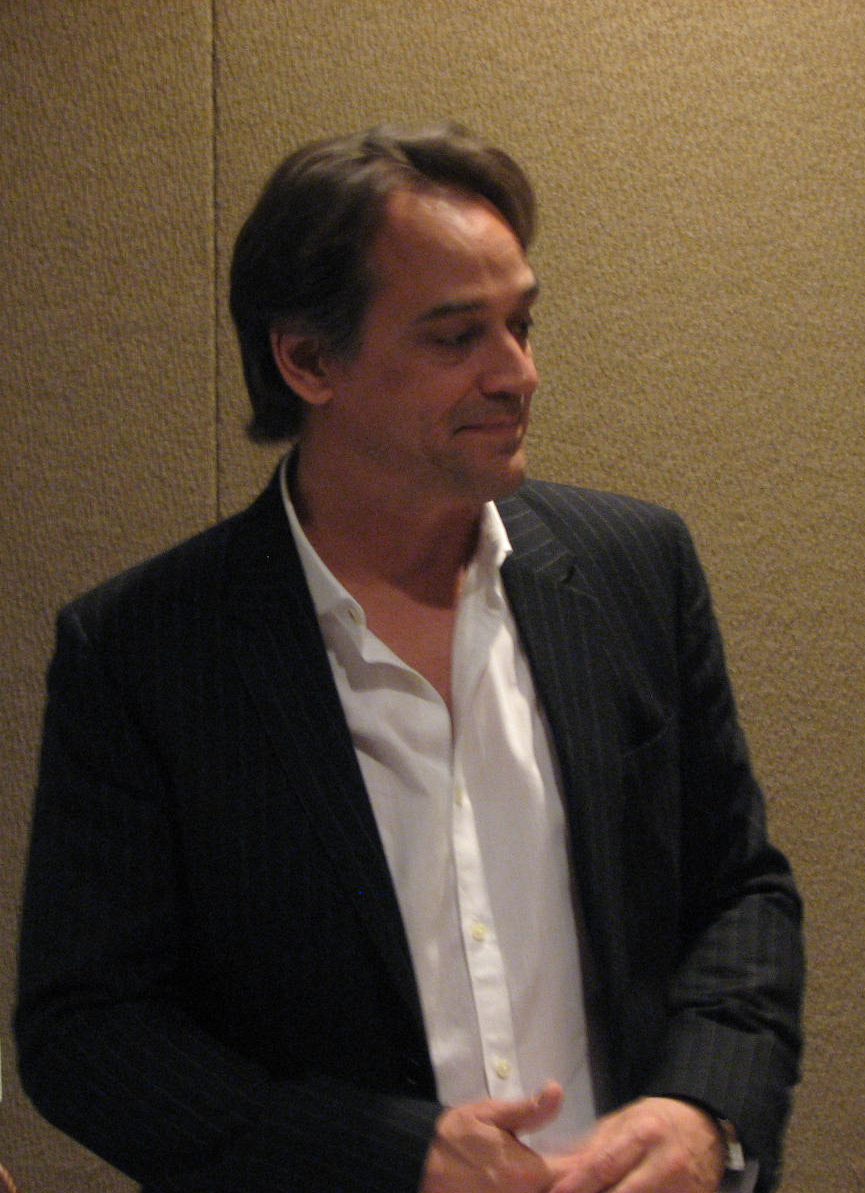
- Lindstrom in 2009
- Born: Jon Robert Lindstrom; October 18, 1957 (age 68); Medford, Oregon, U.S.
- Occupations: Actor; writer; director; producer; musician
- Years active: 1982–present
- Spouses: Eileen Davidson (m. 1997; div. 2000) Cady McClain (m. 2014; sep. 2024)

Jon Robert Lindstrom (born October 18, 1957) is an American actor, writer, director, producer, and musician. He is well known for his roles of Kevin Collins and Ryan Chamberlain on the ABC Daytime soap opera General Hospital and its spin-off Port Charles. Since 2025, he has portrayed the role of Joey Armstrong on the CBS Daytime soap opera Beyond the Gates. In 2024 his debut novel Hollywood Hustle, published February 6 by Crooked Lane Books, is an official USA Today Bestseller.

== Early life and education ==
Lindstrom was born in Medford, Oregon, to Robert, a TV advertising executive, and Suzanne Lindstrom, a homemaker. He has an older brother, Jeff. As a drummer, Lindstrom recorded the album Feel Free to Do So with the band The High Lonesome for the Spark Records label. The record garnered much industry praise and "most-added" status for two singles on the Billboard Hot 100.

Ethnicity:

- father – Swedish, Norwegian
- mother – English, Danish, German

Lindstrom attended the University of Oregon, studying theatre and music, after which he moved to Los Angeles, where he studied with acting teachers Lee Strasberg, Stella Adler and Jeff Corey.

== Personal life ==
An active athlete, he is an active member of the Directors Guild of America, SAG-AFTRA, the Academy of Television Arts & Sciences, and Actors' Equity Association.

Lindstrom is a distant cousin to the late award winning costume designer Donfeld.

Lindstrom married soap opera actress Eileen Davidson in 1997, ending in divorce in 2000. He next married his former As the World Turns co-star Cady McClain in 2014. On April 27, 2024 the couple announced in the joint statement on Instagram that they were separating after 10 years of marriage.

== Filmography ==
=== Film ===
Year	Film	Role	Notes
1989	Listen to Me	Television Reporter	
1994	Oasis Cafe	Zak	
1994	Point of Seduction: Body Chemistry III	DJ	
2005	Must Love Dogs	Peter	
2007	The Hard Easy		Creator, Co-Screenwriter and Co-Executive Producer
2008	The Double Born	Ephraim	
2008	The Sacrifice	Walter Johnson	
2009	Ice Dreams	Nolan	
2011	What Happens Next	Paul Grecco	Original title: You Can't Have It All
2014	How We Got Away With It	Det. Arlen Becker	Director, Co-writer, and Co-producer
2015	God's Not Dead 2	Jim Powell	
2015	Val-En-Tina	James Clarington	
2015	The Queen of Hollywood Blvd.	The Snitch	
2020	A Dark Foe	Vincent the Pimp	
2021	Ten-Cent Daisy	Richard	
2022	Diary of a Spy	George	
2023	Boston Strangler	Doug Berman	
2023	Confidential Informant	Joe Mangano	

=== Television ===
Year	Title	Role	Notes
1982	The Facts of Life Goes to Paris	Young Man	Television film
1982	Voyagers!	Remington	Episode: "Bully and Billy" (S 1:Ep 3)
1983	Square Pegs	Reed Kendall	Episode: "It's Academical" (S 1:Ep 3)
1984	Call to Glory	Bartender	Episodes: "Cover Story" (S 1:Ep 11); "Realities" (S 1:Ep 12)
1984—85	Rituals	Brady Chapin	Main cast
1985	Rocky Road	Jerry Daniels	
1985–86	Santa Barbara	Mark McCormick	
1987	The Alamo: 13 Days to Glory	Capt. Almaron Dickinson	Television film
1989	Generations	Paul Jarre	Episodes: "Pilot episode" (S 1:Ep 1); "Episode 002" (S 1:Ep 2)
1989	21 Jump Street	Mick	Episode: "The Blu Flu" (S 3:Ep 8)
1989	Empty Nest	Joe	Episode: "Between a Cop and a Hard Place" (S 2:Ep 4)
1990	Baywatch	Chris Barron	Episode: "Armored Car" (S 1:Ep 13)
1990	Fall From Grace	Brian	
1992–95, 2018–2023	General Hospital	Ryan Chamberlain	Role from: 1992 to March 1995, August 10, 2018 to February 22, 2023
1993–97, 2004, 2013–2026	General Hospital	Kevin Collins	Role from: December 1993 to May 1997, July 2004, January 30, 2013 to January 6, 2026
1994	Baywatch	Keith Travis	Episodes: "Coronado Del Sol, part 1" (S 4:Ep 14); "Coronado Del Sol, part 2" (S 4:Ep 15)
1997–2003	Port Charles	Kevin Collins	Role from: June 2, 1997 to October 3, 2003
1999	Introducing Dorothy Dandridge		HBO TV Movie
2003	Right on Track	Gregg Enders	Made-for-TV; Disney Channel Original Movie
2006	CSI: Crime Scene Investigation	Martin Sidley	Episode: "Up In Smoke" (S 6:Ep 16)
2006	Everwood	Bill Schmicker	Episode: "Across the Lines" (S 4:Ep 14)
2007	McBride: Dogged	Barry Hastings	Made-for-TV
2007	While the Children Sleep	Tate Walker	Made-for-TV; Also known as The Sitter
2008–10	As the World Turns	Craig Montgomery	Role from: December 3, 2008 to September 10, 2010
2011	Blue Bloods	Judge Fenton	Episode:"Little Fish" (S 1:Ep 11)
2013	Drop Dead Diva	Professor Sharf	Episode: "50 Shades of Grayson" (S 5:Ep 8)
2013	NCIS	Perry Davidson	Episode: "Oil & Water" (S 11:Ep 6)
2014	Castle	Agent Connors	Episode: "Driven" (S 7:Ep 1)
2015	True Detective	Jacob McCandless	Episodes: "The Western Book of the Dead" (S 2:Ep 1); "Night Finds You" (S 2:Ep 2); "Other Lives" (S 2:Ep 5); "Church in Ruins" (S 2:Ep 6); "Omega Station" (S 2:Ep 8)
2016	Recovery Road	William Walker	Episode: "Parties Without Borders" (S 1:Ep 4)
2017–2018	NCIS: Los Angeles	Phillip Nelson	Episode: "Mountebank" (S 9:Ep 5); "Vendetta" (S 9:Ep 18)
2018	S.W.A.T.	Ashe Jones	Episode: "Seizure" (S 1:Ep 10)
2019	Bosch	Lance Cronyn	Episodes: "The Last Scrip" (S 5:Ep 3); "The Space Between the Stars" (S 5:Ep 6); "The Wisdom and the Desert" (S 5:Ep 7); "Hold Back the Night" (S 5:Ep 9)
2019	Homeland	Claude Geroux	Episode: "Prisoners of War" (S 8:Ep 12)
2020	Days of Our Lives	Jack Deveraux	Temporary stand-in December 30, 2020
2021	Bull	Donovan Nichols	Episode: "Wrecked" (S 4:Ep 20)
2025–present	Beyond the Gates	Joey Armstrong	CBS Daytime
2025	Pretty Hurts	Roger Hammond	Lifetime

== Awards and nominations ==
- 2009 Winner, Angel Film Award for Best Ensemble Cast ("The Sacrifice"), Monaco International Film Festival (shared With: Molly C. Quinn, Darby Stanchfield, Chris Mulkey and Richard Riehle)
- 2013 Winner, Best of Fest ("How We Got Away With It"), Film Fest Twain Harte
- 2013 Winner, Audience Choice Award for a Feature Film ("How We Got Away With It"), Marina del Rey Film Festival
- 2013 Finalist, New Filmmakers Forum (NFF) Emerging Director Award ("How We Got Away With It"), St. Louis International Film Festival
- 2013 Winner, 1st Runner-up Stolman Audience Award ("How We Got Away With It"), Sonoma International Film Festival
- 2013 Winner, Best Thriller Feature Film ("How We Got Away With It"), Bare Bones International Film Festival.
- 2013 Nominated, Best Actor/Filmmaker in a Feature Film, Bare Bones International Film Festival (Jon Lindstrom-"How We Got Away With It")
- 2013 Nominated, Best Showcase Feature Film ("How We Got Away With It"), SOHO International Film Festival

=== Daytime Emmy Awards ===
- 2010: Nominated, Outstanding Leading Actor in a Drama Series – As The World Turns
- 2019: Nominated, Outstanding Leading Actor in a Drama Series – General Hospital
- 2020: Nominated, Outstanding Leading Actor in a Drama Series – General Hospital
- 2023: Nominated, Outstanding Supporting Actor in a Drama Series – General Hospital

=== Soap Opera Digest Awards ===
- 1994: Nominated, Outstanding Villain/Villainess – General Hospital
- 2000: Won, Outstanding Supporting Actor – Port Charles
