= Afemo Omilami =

American actor

- Born: December 13, 1950 (age 75); Petersburg, Virginia, U.S.
- Occupation: Actor
- Years active: 1979–present
- Spouse: Elisabeth Williams (m. 1985)
- Children: 2
- Relatives: Hosea Williams (father-in-law); Juanita Terry Williams (mother-in-law)

Afemo Omilami (born December 13, 1950) is an American actor.

== Early life ==
Omilami was born in Petersburg, Virginia on December 13, 1950. Afemo Omilami was born Kenneth Lee.

== Career ==
He has appeared in many films such as Trading Places (1983), Glory (1989), The Firm (1993), Gordy (1995), Remember the Titans (2000), Ray (2004), Hounddog (2007), The Blind Side (2009), and Terminator Genisys (2015). He is perhaps best known for his role as the Drill Sergeant in Forrest Gump (1994). He had a recurring role as the streetwise Jimmy Dawes in In the Heat of the Night from 1989 to 1993. He was nominated for a 2013 NAACP Image Award in the category "Actor in a Television Movie, Mini-Series or Dramatic Special" for his performance in Lifetime's Steel Magnolias as Drum Eatenton.

He also appeared in guest roles in television series Miami Vice, Fortune Hunter, New York News, The Shield, Criminal Minds: Beyond Borders and Raising Dion.

== Personal life ==
He married his wife Elisabeth (née Williams) on September 11, 1985. She is an actress, minister, and a civil rights leader. They have two children: son Awodele and daughter Juanita.

His longtime friend was actor Thomas Jefferson Byrd. After Byrd was killed, Omilami described Byrd as a "devoted father and husband and a master of his craft".

== Filmography ==
=== Film/Movie ===
Year	Title	Role	Notes
1979	Freedom Road	Young Black Man with Scars	TV movie
1983	Rage of Angels	Vet #1	TV movie
1983	Trading Places	Longshoreman	
1986	The Money Pit	Bernie	
1989	Glory	Tall Contraband	
1990	Murder in Mississippi	Bob Moses	TV movie
1990	Caroline?	Taxi Driver	TV movie
1990	The Long Walk Home	Taxi Driver	
1990	Web of Deceit	Bailiff	TV movie
1991	In the Line of Duty: Manhunt in the Dakotas	Prison Guard	TV movie
1991	White Lie	Bartender	TV movie
1993	Sankofa	Noble Ali	
1993	The Firm	Cotton Truck Driver	
1993	The Real McCoy	Cab Dispatcher	
1994	Forrest Gump	Drill Sergeant	
1994	A Simple Twist of Fate	Bailiff	
1994	Drop Squad	Berl "Flip" Mangum	
1994	The War	Quarry Man	
1994	Gordy	Krugman	
1997	The Witchcatcher	Duncan	TV movie
1999	Funny Valentines	Ephraim Lee	
1999	Forces of Nature	Cab Driver	
1999	The Simple Life of Noah Dearborn	Noah's Father	TV movie
1999	Chill Factor	Courtroom Colonel	
1999	Wayward Son	Horace	
1999	Bringing Out The Dead	Griss	
2000	Animal Factory	Captain Midnight	
2000	Tigerland	SFC Ezra Landers	
2000	Remember the Titans	Charles Campbell	
2000	The Runaway	Jule Monroe	TV movie
2001	Tara	Attorney	Video
2001	Rustin	Mel Jones	
2002	The Rosa Parks Story	-	TV movie
2002	Drumline	President Wagner	
2002	I'm with Lucy	Cab Driver #1	
2002	Sweet Home Alabama	Jimmy Lee	
2002	Nowhere Road	-	
2002	Baby of the Family	-	
2003	Runaway Jury	SUV Driver	
2003	Cold Mountain	Joshua	
2004	The Alamo	Sam	
2004	Ray	Angry Husband	
2006	Glory Road	Mr. Flournoy	
2006	Madea's Family Reunion	Isaac Sr.	
2006	Heavens Fall	Leonard George	
2006	Idlewild	Walter	
2007	Hounddog	Charles	
2007	The Reaping	Haman	
2007	The List	A.L. Jenkins	
2008	B.A.M.	The Man	Short
2009	The Blind Side	CPS Caseworker	
2010	Bloodworth	Sheriff Bellweather	
2010	Blood Done Sign My Name	Golden Frinks	
2010	Beneath the Dark	The Man	
2012	Steel Magnolias	Drum Eatenton	TV movie
2013	G.I. Joe: Retaliation	Chairman Joint Chief of Staff	
2013	The Hunger Games: Catching Fire	District 11 Mayor	
2014	The Good Lie	Dr. Monyang	
2015	The Next Day	Roy	Short
2015	Terminator Genisys	Perry	
2015	Sick People	Dr. Johnson	
2016	The Founder	Mr. Merriman	
2016	Hidden Figures	Man Outside Store	
2016	Smoke & Mirrors	Cruschev	Short
2018	Down for Whatever	Lieutenant Baker	TV movie
2019	The Best of Enemies	Franklin Mose	
2019	Poms	David	
2019	A Brother's Honor	Richard Granger	
2019	Full Count	Mr. Gravitt	
2022	Freedom's Path	Ellis Freeman	

=== Television ===
Year	Title	Role	Notes
1984	Another Life	Samir Fayyad	TV series
1984	Miami Vice	Desmond Maxwell	Episode: "Cool Runnin'"
1989–93	In the Heat of the Night	Jimmy Dawes / Det. Walker Harris	Recurring cast: season 2-6 / Season 7 episode 9 (Det. Walker Harris)
1992	I'll Fly Away	Mr. Hendricks	Episode: "Toy Soldiers"
1992	Law & Order	Michael Kano	Episode: "Consultation"
1994	Fortune Hunter	Pierre Toussant	Episode: "Sea Trial"
1995	New York News	-	Episode: "You Thought the Pope Was Something"
1996	Law & Order	Henry Patterson	Episode: "Custody"
1997–99	The Wonderful World of Disney	Sam Parker / John Webb	Episodes: "Flash" / "Selma, Lord, Selma"
1999	Law & Order	Darryl Lamaine	Episode: "Haven"
2001	Sheena	Kontee	Episode: "Mind Games"
2002	Dawson's Creek	Clifton Smalls	2 episodes
2004	The Shield	Vince Peabo	Episode: "Mum"
2007	Side Order of Life	Thomas Beauchamp	Episode: "When Pigs Fly"
2007–08	Ghost Whisperer	Archivist	Supporting cast: season 3
2008	John Adams	Servant	Episode: "Unite or Die"
2010	Past Life	Fred Lamm	Episode: "Dead Man Talking"
2010	Chase	The Chief	Episode: "Pilot"
2015	True Detective	Police Chief Holloway	Recurring cast: Season 2
2016	Mad Dogs	Captain Churchill	Episode: "Needles"
2016–17	Survivor's Remorse	Richard Freeman	3 episodes
2016–18	Saints & Sinners	Detective Noah St. Charles	Main cast: season 1–3
2017	Madam Secretary	President Babacar Diome	Episode: "The Detour"
2017	Criminal Minds: Beyond Borders	Inspector Polino	Episode: "Lost Souls"
2019	Raising Dion	George Lewis	Episode: "Issue #106: Super Friends"
2019	Creepshow	Brenner	Episodes: "The Companion"
2022	Women of the Movement	Add Reed	Episode: "Manhunt"
2024	Genius	Philip Randolph	Episode: "MLK/X: The American Promise"
