= Michael Hyatt =

British-born American actress (active 1995–)

- Born: Handsworth, Birmingham, UK
- Education: BFA (Howard University); MFA (New York University)
- Occupation: Actress
- Years active: 1995–present
- Children: 1

Michael Hyatt is a British-born American actress. Before her work in film and television, she performed on stages throughout the United States, particularly in Ragtime on Broadway. She played Dr. Akopian on Crazy Ex-Girlfriend, Detective Sheila Muncie on Ray Donovan, and Cissy Saint on Snowfall.

== Early life ==
Hyatt was born in Birmingham, West Midlands, to Jamaican-born parents Vera Hyatt, an art historian, museologist, and former deputy director of the National Gallery of Jamaica; and Charles Hyatt, an actor, broadcaster, and comedian.

As a child in 1970s Jamaica, Hyatt was exposed to art and theater by the work of both of her parents. Hyatt migrated to the United States with her mother and two siblings when she was 10 years old. The family lived in Maryland and then Washington, D.C. Hyatt holds a Bachelor of Fine Arts from Howard University and received her Master of Fine Arts from New York University's Tisch School of the Arts. During college, she took a theater practicum, working at Arena Stage in Washington, D.C. During graduate school, she worked for director Spike Lee as an assistant.

== Career ==
Hyatt has worked extensively in theater, television, and film. Early in her career, Hyatt performed for five months on Broadway in the musical Ragtime.

She played the role of Rita in the 2009 Los Angeles production of the Danai Gurira play Eclipsed.

Hyatt played a featured role in the 2014 film Nightcrawler as a police detective. She also held a recurring role in the second season of the HBO series True Detective, and a recurring role on Crazy Ex-Girlfriend as Rebecca's (Rachel Bloom) therapist, Dr. Akopian. Hyatt portrays Detective Sheila Muncie in the TV show Ray Donovan.

In July 2017, she starred on the FX series Snowfall as Cissy Saint, mother of drug dealer Franklin Saint, a role she played from the 2016 pilot to the series's conclusion in 2023.

== Personal life ==
Hyatt has used the name "Michael" since high school, when she was nicknamed for being a fan of American entertainer Michael Jackson. She has one son.

== Awards and honors ==
Year	Award	Category	Work	Result	Ref.
2026	Actor Awards	Outstanding Performance by an Ensemble in a Drama Series	The Pitt	Won	
