= Ritchie Coster =

English actor (b. 1967)

- Born: 1 July 1967 (age 59); London, England
- Education: Latymer School, Edmonton; Guildhall School of Music and Drama
- Occupation: Actor
- Years active: 1997–present

Ritchie Coster (born 1 July 1967) is an English character actor. He is best known for playing the roles of Dietrich Banning in The Tuxedo (2002), the Chechen in The Dark Knight (2008), Elias Kassar in Blackhat (2015), Mayor Austin Chessani on the second season of the HBO anthology television series True Detective, and Francisco Scaramucci/Mr. Blue on the SyFy television series Happy! Since 2025, he has been part of the main cast of the CBS drama series Watson.

== Career ==
Coster has played various roles throughout his career. Coster worked as a Barman in the early 90s at the Rock Island Diner in London's Piccadilly Circus before leaving to concetrate on acting. While in America he was an understudy to Quentin Tarantino in a show.

== Filmography ==
=== Film ===
Year	Title	Role	Notes
1999	The Thomas Crown Affair	Janos	
2000	The Photographer	Attacker #1	
2000	Bait	Buyer	
2001	15 Minutes	News Stand Vendor	
2002	Pipe Dream	Pascal	
2002	The Tuxedo	Dietrich Banning	
2006	The Sentinel	The Handler	
2007	American Gangster	Joey Sadano	
2008	The Dark Knight	The Chechen	
2010	The Bounty Hunter	Ray	
2010	Let Me In	Mr. Zoric	
2010	Pete Smalls Is Dead	Hal Lazar	
2014	By the Gun	Tony Matazano	
2014	Rose	Samuel	Short film
2015	Blackhat	Elias Kassar	
2015	Creed	Pete Sporino	
2016	The Great & the Small	Richie	
2017	Submission	Dean Bentham	
2019	The Bygone	Beckett Summer	
2021	After Yang	Russ	
2024	King Ivory	Mickey Greene	

=== Television ===
Year	Title	Role	Notes
1997	Dellaventura	—N/a	Episode: "Hell's Kitchen"
1997–1998	New York Undercover	Keith Draper and Flannagan	2 episodes
1998	F/X: The Series	Jimmy Hickman	Episode: "Reaper"
1998	Rear Window	Julian Thorpe	TV movie
1999	Law & Order: Special Victims Unit	Carlo Parisi	Episode: "...Or Just Look Like One"
1999	Third Watch	Rudy	Episode: "Sunny, Like Sunshine"
2000	Sex and the City	Caleb McDougal	Episode: "Don't Ask, Don't Tell"; Credited as Richie Coster
2000–2001	As the World Turns	Gabriel Frank	Unknown episodes
2000–2006	Law & Order	Jorgan Stern; Mark Bruner; DEA Agent Kevin Almonte	3 episodes (Note: "Dissonance" as Jorgan Stern, "Bodies" as Mark Bruner and "Invaders" as DEA Agent Kevin Almonte)
2002–2009	Law & Order: Criminal Intent	Simon Matic and Jack Taylor	2 episodes
2002	HBO First Look	Himself	Episode: "'The Tuxedo': Tailor Made for Jackie Chan"
2003	Hack	Nick Trepov	2 episodes
2004	Traffic	Fazal	Miniseries; 3 episodes
2004	With God on Our Side: George W. Bush and the Rise of the Religious Right in America	Himself (Narrator)	TV movie
2005	Jonny Zero	Garret / Garrett	Series regular; 10 episodes
2005	Law & Order: Trial by Jury	Shane Lucas	Episode: "Skeleton"
2005–2006	Guiding Light	Nate / Alfred	4 episodes
2005–2006	Beautiful People	Tyler Lustig	3 episodes
2006	Kidnapped	Bradwell Scott	Episode: "Sorry, Wrong Number"
2008	John Adams	Captain Preston	Episode: "Join or Die"; Miniseries
2008	CSI: Crime Scene Investigation	Arthur Blisterman	Episode: "Art Imitates Life"
2009	Virtuality	Dr. Jimmy Johnson	TV movie
2011–2012	Luck	Renzo	Series regular; 9 episodes
2011	Person of Interest	Assassin	Episode: "Ghosts"
2012	Luck: A Day at the Races	Himself	TV movie
2013	The Blacklist	Anslo Garrick	2 episodes
2014	Babylon Fields	Ernie	TV movie
2015	HBO First Look: Blackhat	Himself	TV movie
2015	Blackhat: On Location Around the World	Himself	Documentary video
2015	Blackhat: Creating Reality	Himself	Documentary video
2015	True Detective	Mayor Austin Chessani	7 episodes
2017	Billions	Donald Thayer	3 episodes
2017	Shades of Blue	Michael Bianci	7 episodes
2017–2019	Happy!	Francisco "Mr. Blue" Scaramucci, Orcus	Main role
2020	The Flight Attendant	Victor	3 episodes
2021	The Walking Dead	Pope	4 episodes
2022–2023	Tulsa King	Caolan Waltrip	7 episodes
2025–2026	Watson	Shinwell Johnson	Main cast

Key
†	Denotes series/miniseries that have not yet been released

=== Video games ===
Year	Title	Voice role
2003	Midnight Club 2	Blog
2007	BioShock	Bill McDonagh
