= Jeff Jensen =

American writer and journalist

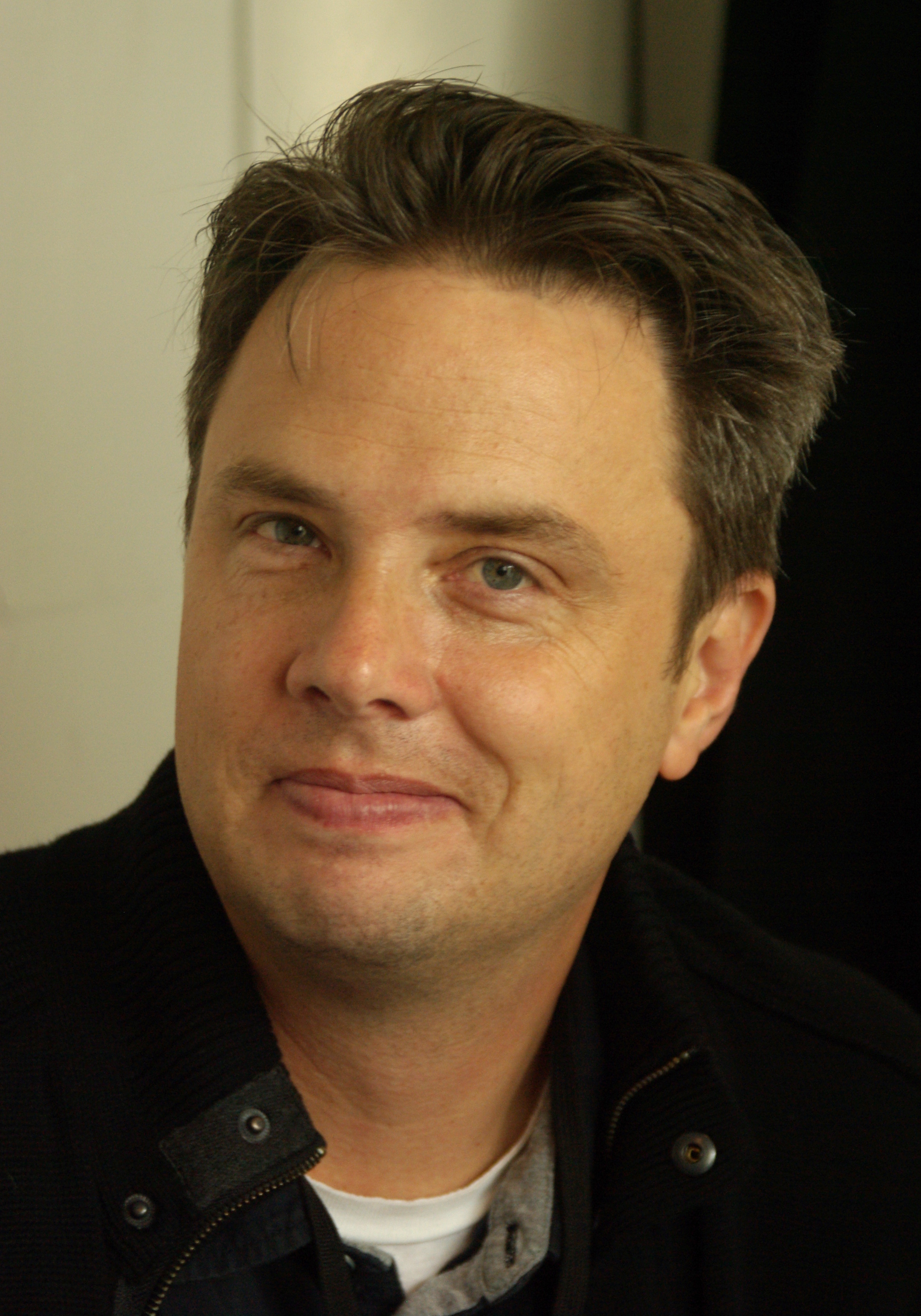
- Jeff Jensen, at the Miami Book Fair International 2011
- Born: Seattle, Washington
- Notable works: Green River Killer: A True Detective Story (2011); Tomorrowland (2015); Watchmen (2019)

Jeff Jensen is an American writer and journalist.

== Early life ==
Jensen is a native of Seattle, Washington, and a graduate of the School of Visual Arts in New York City.

== Career ==
Jensen is a screenwriter, journalist and author based in Lakewood, California. He started in journalism as a reporter for Advertising Age from 1992 to 1998. From 1998 to 2017, he wrote for Entertainment Weekly, covering TV shows like Lost - for which he earned the nickname "Doc Jensen" - and film franchises like Harry Potter. Jensen was the chief TV critic of Entertainment Weekly from 2013 to 2017.

His graphic novel Green River Killer: A True Detective Story (Dark Horse Comics, 2011) drawn by Jonathan Case, won the Eisner for Best Reality-Based Work and was nominated for a Bram Stoker Award. Jensen was uniquely poised to tell the story; his father, Tom Jensen, was a detective who worked on the Green River Killer case for over 20 years. He was a story editor on HBO's Emmy-winning limited series Watchmen, receiving Hugo and Nebula nominations for co-writing the episode "A God Walks Into Abar" with Damon Lindelof. He was an executive producer and writer on the Brad Bird film Tomorrowland and co-authored the film's prequel novel Before Tomorrowland (Disney Publishing, 2015) with Jonathan Case.

Jensen's other comic book credits include Leaf (created by Phil Avelli, NAB Publishing, 1991), Team Titans (DC Comics, 1993–1994) and X-Factor (Marvel Comics, 2002). His short story work can be found in Captain America: Red White and Blue (Marvel Comics, 2002), Love Is Love: A Comic Book Anthology to Benefit the Survivors of the Orlando Pulse Shooting (IDW Publishing, 2016), Planet of the Apes: When Worlds Collide (Boom! Studios, 2019) and Firefly: Watch How I Soar (Boom! Studios, 2020).

Better Angels: A Kate Warne Adventure, illustrated by George Schall, was published by Boom! Studios in October 2021.
