= Yara Martinez =

American actress

Yara Martínez
- Born: Puerto Rico
- Occupation: Actress
- Years active: 2006–present

Yara Martínez is an American television actress, born in Puerto Rico, who is best known for her roles as Kelly in Hollywood Heights, as Dr. Luisa Alver on The CW series Jane the Virgin, and as Bull's wife Isabella on Bull.

== Early life ==
Martínez was born in Puerto Rico and raised in Miami. Prior to acting, Martínez practiced ballet for ten years. She is the grandniece of prima ballerina Alicia Alonso.

== Career ==
She began her career on television with guest-starring roles. In 2007, she had supporting role in film The Hitcher. She later returned to television and had number of guest and recurring roles on dramatic series. She played Mariella Moretta in the TNT crime drama, Southland from 2009 to 2011, and Theresa Lopez on the ABC Family drama, The Lying Game (2012–2013). She also had recurring roles on Vanished, The Unit, Breakout Kings, and Nashville.

Martínez was regular cast member on the short-lived primetime soap opera, Hollywood Heights in 2012. In 2013, she began starring in the Amazon comedy series, Alpha House. In 2014, Martínez also was cast as recurring in The CW comedy-drama Jane the Virgin, and HBO crime drama True Detective. Martínez portrayed Ms. Lint in the Amazon series, The Tick. Martínez stars as Dr. Paula Reyes in the Fox series Deputy. After playing the recurring character Isabella "Izzy" Colón for the first four seasons of the CBS legal drama Bull, Martínez was upgraded to series regular for season 5 (2020–21).

== Filmography ==
| Year | Title | Role | Notes |
|---|---|---|---|
| 2001 | Sex and the City | Woman in Restaurant | Episode: "Anchors Away" |
| 2006 | Faceless | Mari Reynosa | Television film |
| 2006 | It's Always Sunny in Philadelphia | Kelly | Episode: "Dennis and Dee Get a New Dad" |
| 2006 | Vanished | Ava Herrera | Recurring role, 4 episodes |
| 2007 | The Hitcher | Beth | |
| 2007 | The Unit | Annie | Recurring role, 7 episodes |
| 2008 | ER | Mia | Episode: "Owner of a Broken Heart" |
| 2008 | The Apostles | Erin McBride | Television pilot |
| 2008 | Spaced | Vivienne | Television pilot |
| 2009 | Boldly Going Nowhere | Ruby | Television pilot |
| 2009–11 | Southland | Mariella Moretta | Recurring role, 7 episodes |
| 2010 | CSI: NY | Lisa Brigosa | Episode: "Sangre por Sangre" |
| 2010 | Chase | Karen Nelson | Episode: "Under the Radar" |
| 2010 | A Walk in My Shoes | Molly | Television film |
| 2011 | Law & Order: LA | Soledad Alvarado | Episode: "El Sereno" |
| 2011–12 | Breakout Kings | Marisol | Recurring role, 3 episodes |
| 2012 | Hollywood Heights | Kelly | Series regular, 56 episodes |
| 2012–13 | The Lying Game | Theresa Lopez | Recurring role, 10 episodes |
| 2013 | Nashville | Carmen Gonzalez | 2 episodes |
| 2013 | Criminal Minds | Tara Rios | Episode: "Nanny Dearest" |
| 2013 | Hawaii Five-0 | Lyla Simmons | Episode: "Aloha. Malama Pono" |
| 2013 | Necessary Roughness | Alex Careles | Episode: "Sympathy for the Devil" |
| 2013–14 | Alpha House | Adriana de Portago | Series regular |
| 2014–19 | Jane the Virgin | Dr. Luisa Alver | Recurring role |
| 2015 | True Detective | Felicia | Recurring role |
| 2016 | Rosewood | Julia Delgado | Episode: "Silkworms y Silencio" |
| 2016–22 | Bull | Isabella "Izzy" Colón | Recurring (seasons 1–4); main (seasons 5–6) |
| 2017–19 | The Tick | Ms. Lint | Series regular |
| 2018 | This Is Us | Amber Rivas | Episode: "Six Thanksgivings" |
| 2020 | Deputy | Dr. Paula Reyes | Series regular |
| 2024 | Chicago P.D. | Gloria Perez | 4 episodes |
| 2024 | Junction | Nurse Kat | |
| 2026 | Beef | Jamie | Episode: "The Hour of Separation" |
| 2026 | Matlock | Vicki | Episode: "The Future is Nigh" |
