= Michael Irby =

American film and television actor (born 1972)

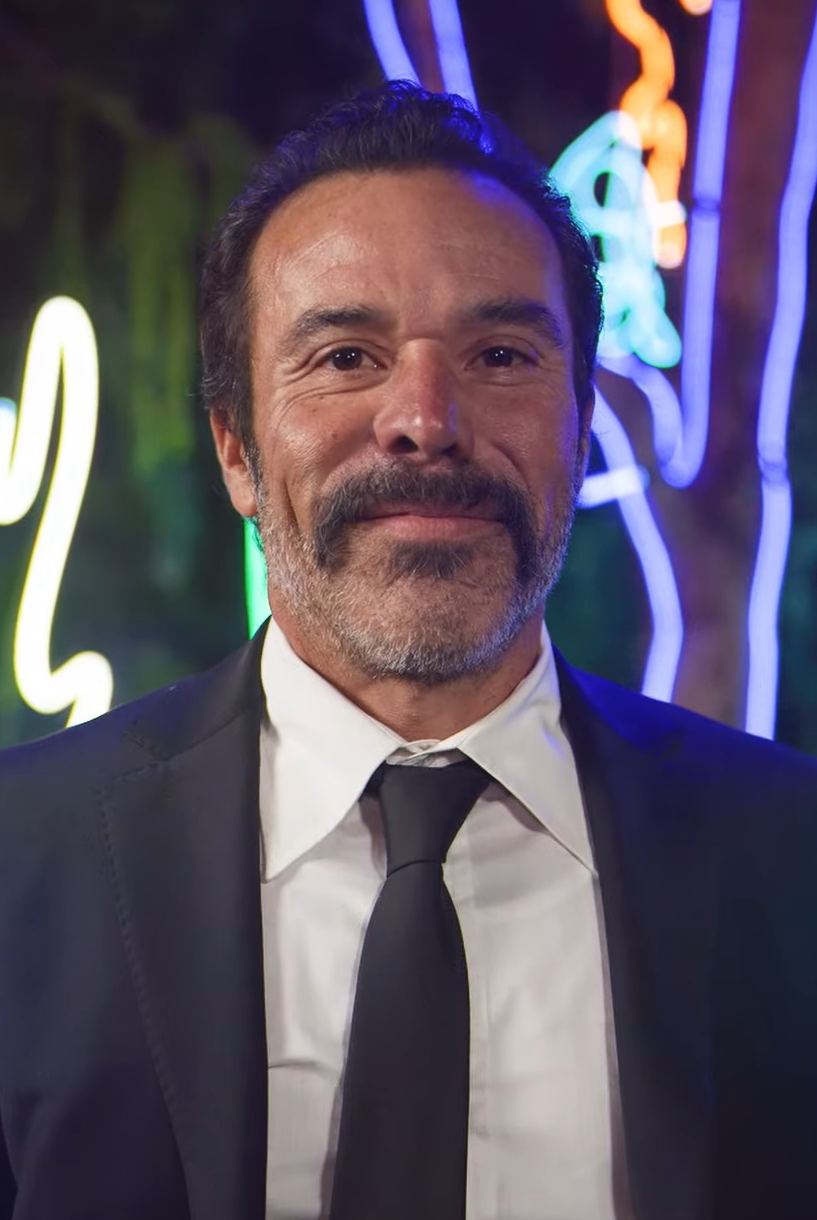
- Irby in 2024
- Born: Michael Clinton Irby; November 16, 1972 (age 53); Palm Springs, California, US
- Years active: 1997–present
- Spouse: Susan Matus
- Children: 1

Michael Clinton Irby (born November 16, 1972) is an American actor known for portraying Sergeant First Class Charles Grey in the CBS series The Unit (2006–2009), and more recently, for his work as Obispo 'Bishop' Losa in Mayans M.C. (2018–2023) and Cristobal Sifuentes on the HBO series Barry (2018–2023).

== Early life and education ==
Irby was born in Palm Springs, California, the son of Ernie and Cynthia Ann Irby. He is of mixed Mexican-American and African-American heritage and has two brothers, Jason and Ernest III.

With a lifelong love for association football, he played in Europe as part of Team USA before he was forced to give it up due to injury.

Following the end of his football career, he attended College of the Desert in Palm Desert, California and Orange Coast College in Costa Mesa, California. His drama professor encouraged him to pursue a career in theater at the American Academy of Dramatic Arts, New York City.

== Personal life ==
Irby is married to Susan Matus, whom he met while studying in New York. They have one son.

== Selected filmography ==
- Silent Prey (1997) as Assistant D.A. Oniz
- Law & Order (1999–2000, TV Series) as John Acosta / Diego Garza / Boca
- Mourning Glory (2001) as Luis
- Piñero (2001) as Reinaldo Povod
- The Last Castle (2001) as Enriquez
- MDs (2002, TV Series) as Jaime Lopez
- Haunted (2002, TV Series) as Dante
- CSI: Miami (2002, TV Series) as Ignatio Paez
- Final Draft (2003) as Elijah
- Klepto (2003) as Marco
- Line of Fire (2003–2005, TV Series) as Amiel Macarthur
- CSI: NY (2004–2011, TV Series) as Kenny Hexton / Eduardo
- Flightplan (2005) as Obaid
- Once Upon a Wedding (2005) as Luis
- The Unit (2006–2009, TV Series) as Charles Grey
- Law Abiding Citizen (2009) as Detective Garza
- NCIS: Los Angeles (2010, TV Series) as Montrell Perez
- 24 (2010, TV Series) as Adrion Bishop
- Lie to Me (2010, TV Series) as Ronnie Bacca
- Louis (2010) as Robichaux
- Faster (2010) as Vaquero
- Fast Five (2011) as Zizi
- Bones (2011, TV Series) as Bowling alley employee
- The Protector (2011, TV Series) as Roberto Casas
- Dirty People (2012) as Robert
- Common Law (2012, TV Series) as Jason
- The Mentalist (2012, Season 5, Episode 4: "Blood Feud") as Beltran
- K-11 (2012) as Lieutenant Hernandez
- Person of Interest (2012, TV Series) as Fermin Ordoñez
- Elementary (2013, Season 1, Episode 15: "A Giant Gun, Filled with Drugs") as Xande Diaz
- Vegas (2013, Season 1, Episode 17: "Hollywood Ending") as Eddie Bade
- Hawaii Five-0 (2013, Season 3, Episode 24: "Aloha, Malama Pono") as Rafael Salgado
- Almost Human (2013–2014, TV Series) as Detective Richard Paul
- Crisis (2014, TV Series) as Khani
- The Following (2015, TV Series) as Andrew Sharp
- CSI: Cyber (2015, TV Series) as Navy Cap. David Ortega M.D.
- True Detective (2015, TV Series) as Detective Elvis Ilinca
- Rosewood (2015, TV Series) as Agent Giordano
- Taken (2017, TV Series) as Scott
- SEAL Team (2017-2018, TV Series) as Master Chief Special Warfare Operator Adam Seaver
- Mayans M.C. (2018–2023, TV Series) as Obispo 'Bishop' Losa
- Barry (2018–2023, TV Series) as Cristobal Sifuentes
- Duke (2019) as Evelio
- Bolden! (2019)
- The Expanse (2020, TV Series) as Admiral Delgado
- Last Seen Alive (2022) as Oscar
- Lopez vs Lopez (2024) as Father Ramirez
- The Lincoln Lawyer (TV series) (2024) as Agent James de Marco
- Osiris (2025) as Reyes
- The Night Agent (2026) as Michael
- Miami Vice '85 (2028) as Lou Rodriguez
