= Jordan Fudge =

American film producer and venture capitalist

- Born: Los Angeles, California
- Education: Northwestern University
- Occupations: Film producer; Venture Capitalist

Jordan Fudge is an American film producer and venture capitalist. He was included in Forbes' "30 Under 30" list in 2020 and was named Variety magazine's 10 Producers to Watch in 2021.

Fudge is the founder of New Slate Ventures, a film and television production company and film that focuses on intersectional, inclusive and culturally impactful stories. He is also the founder and managing partner of Sinai Ventures, a multi-stage venture capital firm investing in software and technology ventures.

== Early life and education ==
Fudge was born and raised in Los Angeles, California and attended Northwestern University. He also studied film, attending film school before beginning his career in media and venture capital.

== Career ==
Fudge began his career in 2014 at 20th Century Fox Television, where he worked in the digital strategies department. In 2015, he met German investor Ekkehart Hassels-Weiler, head of Eagle Advisors. After discussing opportunities in technology and media, Fudge recommended investments in companies such as Nvidia, which yielded significant returns. Following this, he joined Eagle Advisors as an associate, focusing on technology investments.

=== Venture capital ===
In 2017, Fudge proposed spinning out the firm's private technology investments into a standalone venture capital fund. With seed capital of approximately $100 million from Eagle Advisors, he co-founded Sinai Ventures with Eric Reiner, a classmate from Northwestern. The firm launched in early 2018 with offices in New York and San Francisco before relocating its operations to Los Angeles. Under Fudge's leadership, Sinai Ventures grew into a multi-stage fund managing over $100 million and investing in more than 80 companies, including Pinterest, Compass, Ro, Carta, Drivetime, Kapwing, and Luminary. An investment in Pinterest prior to its 2019 initial public offering was one of the fund's most notable exits.

In 2020, Sinai Capital Partners, the umbrella under which Sinai Ventures operates, announced it had raised $600 million, with $500 million dedicated to technology investments and $100 million allocated to New Slate Ventures, Fudge's film and television production company. Fudge has emphasized a focus on companies in technology, media, health and wellness, as well as international markets such as Latin America and India. He has also cited the advantages of being based in Los Angeles, describing the city as an emerging hub for startups at the intersection of entertainment and technology.

=== Film ===
Fudge, through New Slate Ventures, helped finance feature film The Forty-Year-Old Version after being introduced to the project by WME with Lena Waithe attached as producer. The film went on to premiere at the 2020 Sundance Film Festival, where it won the U.S. Dramatic Competition directing award and was later acquired in a bidding war by Netflix. He was nominated for the 2021 Independent Spirit Award for Best First Feature for The Forty-Year-Old Version.

Fudge produced The 24th through New Slate Ventures, which fully financed the film. The drama, depicting the 1917 Houston riot, was originally scheduled to premiere at South by Southwest before the festival's cancellation due to the COVID-19 pandemic, and was later released on video-on-demand by Vertical Entertainment.

In 2021, Fudge produced The United States vs. Billie Holiday through New Slate Ventures. The film was directed by Lee Daniels and starred Andra Day. Initially associated with a planned distribution deal with Paramount Pictures, the project was later acquired by Hulu in late 2020 in a deal reported to exceed the original arrangement.

In 2022, Fudge joined as a producer on Free Money, a documentary feature exploring the impact of a universal basic income program in the Kenyan village of Kogutu. The film, backed by New Slate Ventures in partnership with Insignia Films, premiered at the Toronto International Film Festival. That same year, he served as an executive producer on They Call Me Magic, a four-part Apple TV+ documentary series about the life and career of basketball player Earvin “Magic” Johnson, as well as on Icarus: The Aftermath, a sequel to the Academy Award-winning Icarus that examines Russia's doping scandal and its aftermath.

In 2024, Fudge was an executive producer on Los Frikis, a Spanish-language drama set in 1990s Cuba, which follows young outcasts who willingly contracted HIV to secure food during the island nation's 'Special Period.'

== Personal life ==
Fudge is openly gay and, in 2019, joined the board of the LGBTQ advocacy organization GLAAD. He has also held a role as a young associate director at the Metropolitan Opera.

== Filmography ==
=== Producer ===
| Year | Film | Notes |
|---|---|---|
| 2025 | Los Frikis | Multiple festival screenings, critical acclaim |
| 2024 | Free Money | Premiered at Toronto International Film Festival |
| 2021 | The United States vs. Billie Holiday | Oscar nominee for Best Actress |
| 2020 | The 24th | SXSW Official Selection; Critical acclaim |
| 2020 | The Forty-Year-Old Version | Debut film; Sundance film festival premiere; Critical Acclaim |

=== Executive Producer ===
| Year | Film | Notes |
|---|---|---|
| 2022 | Icarus: The Aftermath | Sequel to the Academy Award-winning Icarus |
| 2022 | They Call Me Magic | A four-part Apple TV+ documentary series |
