= 11th Hollywood Music in Media Awards =

US film music awards ceremony in 2020

- Date: January 27, 2021
- Location: Virtual
- Website: www.hmmawards.com

The 11th Hollywood Music in Media Awards was held on January 27, 2021 to recognize the best in music in film, TV, video games, commercials, and trailers. The nominations were announced on January 15, 2021. Kenny Loggins was honored with the Career Achievement Award.

== Winners and nominees ==
=== Score ===
Original Score — Feature Film	Original Score — Independent Film
News of the World – James Newton Howard; Da 5 Bloods – Terence Blanchard; The Life Ahead – Gabriel Yared; Ma Rainey's Black Bottom – Branford Marsalis; Mank – Trent Reznor and Atticus Ross; The Midnight Sky – Alexandre Desplat; Pieces of a Woman – Howard Shore; The Trial of the Chicago 7 – Daniel Pemberton	Minari – Emile Mosseri; The 24th – Alex Heffes; Ammonite – Dustin O'Halloran and Volker Bertelmann; The Glorias – Elliot Goldenthal; Shirley – Tamar-kali; Wild Mountain Thyme – Amelia Warner
Original Score — Animated Film	Original Score — Sci-Fi/Fantasy Film
Soul – Trent Reznor, Atticus Ross, and Jon Batiste; The Croods: A New Age – Mark Mothersbaugh; Onward – Mychael Danna and Jeff Danna; A Shaun the Sheep Movie: Farmageddon – Tom Howe; Wolfwalkers – Bruno Coulais	Tenet – Ludwig Göransson; The New Mutants – Mark Snow; The Old Guard – Volker Bertelmann and Dustin O'Halloran; Palm Springs – Matthew Compton; Wonder Woman 1984 – Hans Zimmer
Original Score — Horror Film	Original Score — Documentary
The Invisible Man – Benjamin Wallfisch; Antebellum – Nate Wonder and Roman GianArthur; The Dark and the Wicked – Tom Schraeder; The Empty Man – Christopher Young and Lustmord; Swallow – Nathan Halpern	David Attenborough: A Life on Our Planet – Steven Price; Athlete A – Jeff Beal; Crip Camp – Bear McCreary; John Lewis: Good Trouble – Tamar-kali; Rising Phoenix – Daniel Pemberton
Original Score — Independent Film (Foreign Language)	Original Score — TV Movie/Streamed
Blizzard of Souls – Lolita Ritmanis; All Against All – Kristian Sensini; Black Beach – Arturo Cardelús; Summer Knight – Min He; Zerø – Ricardo Curto	Evil Eye – Ronit Kirchman; Bad Education – Michael Abels; Bad Hair – Kris Bowers; Clouds – Brian Tyler; Fearless – Anne-Kathrin Dern; Sylvie's Love – Fabrice Lecomte
Original Score — TV Show/Limited Series	Original Score — Documentary TV Series
The Queen's Gambit – Carlos Rafael Rivera; Bridgerton – Kris Bowers; The Crown – Martin Phipps; Lovecraft Country – Laura Karpman and Raphael Saadiq; Star Trek: Discovery – Jeff Russo; Ted Lasso – Tom Howe and Marcus Mumford	Belushi – Tree Adams; The Devil Next Door – Antônio Pinto and Eduardo Aram; Lenox Hill – Uri Frost; McMillion$ – Pinar Toprak; Night on Earth – Edmund Butt; Tiger King: Murder, Mayhem and Madness – Mark Mothersbaugh, John Enroth, Albert Fox, and Robert Mothersbaugh
Original Score — Short Film (Animated)	Original Score — Short Film (Live Action)
Mime Your Manners – Corey Wallace; Aura – Sturdivant Adams; Scribblings – Nolan Markey; Sticks and Stones – Daniel Markovich; The Wrong Rock – Grant Kirkhope; To Gerard – Layla Minoui	Imagine Symphony Live – Chris Thomas; A Bathroom on Drake – Dave Catalano; Defenseless – J.M. Quintana Cámara; My People, My Country – Zhiyi Wang; The First Color – Annie Rosevear; The Water Walker – Jay Wadley, Trevor Gureckis, and Adam Weiss
Original Score — Video Game	Original Song/Score — Mobile Video Game
Marvel's Spider-Man: Miles Morales – John Paesano; Assassin's Creed Valhalla – Jesper Kyd, Sarah Schachner, and Einar Selvik; Ghost of Tsushima – Ilan Eshkeri and Shigeru Umebayashi; Hades – Darren Korb; Marvel's Avengers – Bobby Tahouri; Ori and the Will of the Wisps – Gareth Coker; Star Wars: Squadrons – Gordy Haab; The Last of Us Part II – Gustavo Santaolalla and Mac Quayle	Call of Duty: Mobile – Wilbert Roget, II, Guillaume Roussel and additional artists; Game for Peace – Theme by Brian Tyler; Score by Austin Wintory, Inon Zur, Wells Zhang, Jon Everist, Jeff Broadbent, Dan Martinez, Edwin Wendler, Jason Walsh Obadiah Brown-Beach, Steven Grove, and David Westbom; Garena Free Fire – Nobuko Toda and Ludvig Forssell; Honor of Kings – Edouard Brenneisen, Daniel James and additional artists; Kingdom Craft – Lei Huang and Matthew Carl Earl; Mythgard – John Robert Matz
Original Song/Score — Trailer
Dune trailer – Music Supervisor/Music Director: Stephanie Koury; Music Score by Hans Zimmer; Eclipse Written by Roger Waters

=== Song ===
Original Song — Feature Film	Original Song — Independent Film
"Io sì (Seen)" from The Life Ahead – Written by Diane Warren, Laura Pausini, and Niccolò Agliardi; Performed by Laura Pausini; "Fight for You" from Judas and the Black Messiah – Written by Gabriella Wilson, Dernst Emile II, and Tiara Thomas; Performed by H.E.R.; "Hear My Voice" from The Trial of the Chicago 7 – Written by Daniel Pemberton and Celeste Waite; Performed by Celeste; "Húsavík (Hometown)" from Eurovision Song Contest: The Story of Fire Saga – Written by Savan Kotecha, Rickard Göransson, and Fat Max Gsus; Performed by Will Ferrell, Rachel McAdams, and Molly Sandén; "The Plan" from Tenet – Written by Jacques Webster II, Ebony Naomi Oshunrinde, and Ludwig Göransson; Performed by Travis Scott; "Poverty Porn" from The 40-Year-Old Version – Written by Radha Blank and Christopher Tyson; Performed by RadhaMUSPrime; "Speak Now" from One Night in Miami... – Written by Leslie Odom Jr. and Sam Ashworth; Performed by Leslie Odom Jr.; "Tigrees & Tweed" from The United States vs. Billie Holiday – Written by Raphael Saadiq and Andra Day; Performed by Andra Day	"Everybody Cries" from The Outpost – Written by Rod Lurie, Larry Groupé, and Rita Wilson; Performed by Rita Wilson; "I'll Be Singing" from Wild Mountain Thyme – Written by Amelia Warner and John Patrick Shanley; Performed by Sinéad O'Connor; "Rain Song" from Minari – Written by Emile Mosseri and Stefanie Hong; Performed by Yeri Han; "Staring at a Mountain" from Never Rarely Sometimes Always – Written and Performed by Sharon Van Etten
Original Song — Animated Film	Original Song — Documentary
"Just Sing" from Trolls World Tour – Written by Max Martin, Justin Timberlake, Ludwig Göransson, and Sarah Aarons; Performed by Justin Timberlake, Anna Kendrick, Kelly Clarkson, Mary J. Blige, Anderson .Paak, and Kenan Thompson; "Carried Me with You" from Onward – Written by Brandi Carlile, Phil Hanseroth, and Tim Hanseroth; Performed by Brandi Carlile; "Feel the Thunder" from The Croods: A New Age – Written by Alana Haim, Danielle Haim, Este Haim, and Ariel Rechtshaid; Performed by Haim; "Free" from The One and Only Ivan – Written by Diane Warren; Performed by Charlie Puth; "Rocket to the Moon" from Over the Moon – Written by Christopher Curtis, Marjorie Duffield, and Helen Park; Performed by Cathy Ang; "Stand for Hope - When I Stand with You" from Two by Two: Overboard! – Written by Eímear Noone; Performed by Sibéal Ní Chasaide	"Never Break" from Giving Voice – Written by John Stephens, Nasri Atweh, Benjamin Hudson McIldowie, and Greg Wells; Performed by John Legend; "The Future" from The Way I See It – Written and Performed by Aloe Blacc; "How Can I Tell You?" from Nasrin – Written by Lynn Ahrens and Stephen Flaherty; Performed by Angélique Kidjo; "Only the Young" from Miss Americana – Written by Taylor Swift and Joel Little; Performed by Taylor Swift; "See What You've Done" from Belly of the Beast – Written by Mary J. Blige, Brittany "Chi" Coney, Denisa "Blu June" Andrews, and Darhyl Camper; Performed by Mary J. Blige; "Turntable" from All In: The Fight for Democracy – Written and Performed by Janelle Monáe
Original Song — TV Show/Limited Series	Original Song — Video Game
"All for Us" from Euphoria – Written by Timothy McKenzie; Performed by Labrinth and Zendaya; "The Eddy" from The Eddy – Written by Glen Ballard and Randy Kerber; Performed by The Eddy featuring Joanna Kulig on vocals; "One Less Angel" from The Marvelous Mrs. Maisel – Written by Thomas Mizer and Curtis Moore; Performed by Darius de Haas; "Out There" from Seven Worlds, One Planet – Written by Sia Furler, Hans Zimmer, and Christopher Braide; Performed by Sia; "Toss a Coin to Your Witcher" from The Witcher – Written by Sonya Belousova, Giona Ostinelli, and Jenny Klein; Performed by Joey Batey; "Tulsa, 1921 - Catch the Fire" from Lovecraft Country – Written by Laura Karpman and Raphael Saadiq; Performed by Janai Brugger	"The Baddest" from League of Legends – Written by Riot Music Team and Bekuh BOOM; Performed by Soyeon of (G)I-DLE, Miyeon of (G)I-DLE, Bea Miller, and Wolftyla; "In the Blood" from Hades – Written by Darren Korb; Performed by Darren Korb and Ashley Barrett; "Weeping Dawn" from Baldur's Gate III – Written by Borislav Slavov; Performed by Vesela Delcheva and Budapest Studio Orchestra; "Renegade" from Arknights – Written by Jason Walsh; Performed by Substantial and X.ARI; "I'm Ready" from Marvel's Spider-Man: Miles Morales – Written by Jaden Smith, Josiah Bell, Omarr Rambert, and Alex Hackford; Performed by Jaden Smith; "The Way of the Ghost" from Ghost of Tsushima – Written by Ilan Eshkeri and Jenny Plant; Performed by Clare Uchima; "BB's Theme" from Death Stranding – Written by Ludvig Forssell; Performed by Jenny Plant
Original Song/Score — Commercial Advertisement	Original Song — Short Film
"Enigma (Give a Bit of Mmh to Me)" from Kinder Bueno TV Commercial – Written by Rainer Pietsch and Amanda Lear; Produced and Composed by Jake Warren; Performed by Alice Ella	"Brave" from The Great Artist – Written by Jon Altham, Pia Toscano, and Matthew Postlethwaite; Performed by Pia Toscano

=== Music Supervision ===
Music Supervision — Film	Music Supervision — Television
Bonnie Greenberg – The Life Ahead; Angela Leus – Trolls World Tour; Guy C. Routte – The 40-Year-Old Version; Linda Cohen – The High Note; Lynn Fainchtein – The United States vs. Billie Holiday; Sue Jacobs – Promising Young Woman; Tom MacDougall – Soul	Angela Vicari – The Eddy; Gabe Hilfer – Ozark; Jen Malone – The Umbrella Academy; Matt Biffa – Sex Education; Nora Felder and Heather Guibert – Better Things; Stephanie Diaz-Matos and Sarah Bromberg – P-Valley
Music Supervision — Video Game
Square-Enix Sound Division – Final Fantasy VII Remake; Alex Hackford, Peter Scatturo, and Keith Leary – Ghost of Tsushima; Sam Marshall, Marc Senasac, and Jonathan Mayer – Concrete Genie; Scott Hanau, Alex Hackford, and Rob Goodson – Marvel's Spider-Man: Miles Morales; Scott Hanau, Rob Goodson, and Scott Shoemaker – The Last of Us Part II

=== Other ===
Music Documentary/Special Program	Soundtrack Album
Bee Gees: How Can You Mend a Broken Heart – Produced by Jeanne Elfant Festa, Mark Monroe, and Nigel Sinclair; Directed by Frank Marshall; Coachella: 20 Years in the Desert – Produced by Michael W. Abbott, Andrew Klein, Skip Paige, and Chris Perkel; Directed by Chris Perkel and Drew Thomas; The Go-Go's – Produced by Eimhear O'Neill, Corey Russell, and Trevor Birney; Directed by Alison Ellwood; Miss Americana – Produced by Morgan Neville, Christine O'Malley, and Caitrin Rogers; Directed by Lana Wilson; Song Exploder – Produced by Caryn Capotosto and Bryan Younce; Directed by Nicola Marsh and Morgan Neville	Promising Young Woman; Assassin's Creed Valhalla; Bill & Ted Face the Music; Jingle Jangle: A Christmas Journey; Onward; Soul; The Eddy
Main Title Theme — TV Show/Limited Series	Main Title Theme — TV Show (Foreign Language)
Hollywood – Nathan Barr; Hunters – Trevor Gureckis; Marvel's 616 – Jeremy Turner; P-Valley – Jucee Froot and Katori Hall; The Queen's Gambit – Carlos Rafael Rivera; The Witcher – Sonya Belousova and Giona Ostinelli	Dofaat Beirut – Amir Hedayah
Music Video (Independent)	Live Concert for Visual Media
The National Parks – "Wildflower"; Carla Patullo – "Apotheke"; Hooked Like Helen – "Liar"; Jamie Alimorad – "Brighter Days"; JayQ the Legend – "Body Talk Remix"; Olivia Rox – "Galileo"; Riotron – "Dark Highway"; The Red Jumpsuit Apparatus – "Is This the Real World?"; Wouter Kellerman and Mzansi Youth Choir – "The Climb"	Shawn Mendes: Live in Concert

== 2020 Music Genre Winners ==
Following artists have been awarded in the 2020 Music Genre categories:

Rising Star Award (Female) Annabel Whitledge

Rising Star Award (Male) Alexander James Rodriguez

Adult Contemporary/AAA Estrella Cristina

Alternative Modern Eyes

Americana/Folk/Acoustic Derek Woods Band

Blues Samantha Fish

Children's Music Kendra K

Christian/Gospel Chris Bender

Contemporary Classical Brian Ralston

Country Johnny Collier

Dance Therése Neaimé

Downbeat/Downtempo Lionel Cohen & JVMIE

EDM (Electronic Dance Music) Philippe Funk

Holiday Juliet Lyons & Robin Sandoval

Instrumental Armin Kandel

Instrumental Performance (Guitar) AM Dandy (United States)

Instrumental Performance (Orchestra) Suad Bushnaq (Canada)

Instrumental Performance (Piano) Goetz Oestlind (Germany)

Instrumental Performance (Violin) Alejandra Torres & Roberto Quintero (Austria)

Jazz ABC

Latin (Pop/Rock/Urban) Daniel Minimalia ft. Esmeralda Grao

Latin (Traditional) Quintero's Salsa Project

Live Stream Performance - Presented by Gigmor Model Stranger

Lyrics/Lyricist Kapri

Message Song/Social Impact Reina (Ft. Verdine White, Nipsey Hussle)

New Age/Ambient Peter Sterling

Pop Riotron

Producer/Production - Presented by Dynaudio Noah Lifschey

R&B/Soul Savannah Brister

Rap/Hip Hop Derin Falana

Reggae - Presented by Island City Media Group Conkarah ft. Shaggy

Rock Aris Paul Band

Singer-Songwriter Shelly Peiken

Vocal (Female) Taylor Castro

Vocal (Male) Kai Straw

World Fahad Al Kubaisi

== 2020 Music Genre Nominees ==
Americana/Folk/Acoustic

- Angela Parrish & Ian Honeyman
- Chet Nichols
- Chris Watkins / Drunk Poets
- DeDe Wedekind
- Derek Woods Band
- J Edna Mae
- Peter Olsen
- The Sometimes Boys

Blues

- Anthony Gomes
- Dallas Hodge
- Dean James
- Samantha Fish
- Tom Euler
- Trevor Sewell

Contemporary Classical

- André Barros
- Brian Ralston
- Dimitris Dodoras
- Fabian Kratzer
- Jennifer Thomas
- Jing Zhang
- Lolita Ritmanis
- Matias Bacoñsky
- Michael Maas
- Michel Huygen & The London Symphony Orchestra
- Oli Jogvansson
- Simone Cilio
- Stéphanie Hamelin Tomala

Country

- Alan Morgan
- Andreas Stone
- Austin Hopkins
- Brent Payne
- Dolylamby
- Grant Maloy Smith
- Johnny Collier
- Michael Lusk
- Tiffany Ashton

Jazz

- Cynthia Thijs Coenraad
- Dimitris Angelakis
- Duo Manibe'
- George & The Good Vibes
- Mark Etheredge
- Milana Zilnik
- Paul Messina
- Paul W. Rucker
- Peter Xifaras' Symphonex Orchestra
- Ralph Johnson ft. Gerald Clayton
- Roberto Tola
- Suzanne Grzanna
- Udo Pannekeet

Instrumental

- Elly Jay
- Iros Young
- Joep Sporck
- Jon Altham
- Masa Takumi
- Octavio Bernal
- Roman Miroshnichenko
- Sybrid
- Wouter Kellerman & Nadia Shpachenko

Latin (Pop/Rock/Urban)

- Daniel Minimalia ft. Esmeralda Grao
- Juan Francisco Zerpa
- La Santa Maria
- Nico Donys
- Willie Gomez, Paulina Aguirre, Gustav Afsahi, BLUTH

Singer-Songwriter

- Carson Rowland
- Charles V. Rox Vaccaro
- Charly Reynolds
- Darla Cozzarelli
- Gavriel
- Gregory Crimson
- Joe Cameron
- Sean Waterman
- Terry Blade

== Rising Star Special Awards ==
=== Rising Star (Male) ===
- Alexander James Rodriguez

=== Rising Star (Female) ===
- Annabel Whitledge

== Career Achievement Honor ==
- Kenny Loggins
