= Alex Rodriguez (disambiguation) =

Alex Rodriguez (born 1975) is an American Major League Baseball player.

Alex Rodriguez or Alexander Rodriguez may also refer to:

- Álex Rodríguez (film editor) (born 1971), Mexican film editor
- Alex Rodriguez (musician), American musician
- Alex Rodriguez (Andorran footballer) (born 1980), Andorran footballer
- Álex Rodríguez (Panamanian footballer) (born 1990), Panamanian football goalkeeper
- Alex Rodríguez (Spanish footballer) (born 1993), Spanish footballer who plays for Linfield
- Alexander Rodríguez (gymnast) (born 1985), Puerto Rican gymnast
- Alexander James Rodriguez (born 2007), British actor
- Alexander Rodríguez (cyclist), Colombian cyclist and competitor in the 2001 Vuelta a Colombia

== See also ==
- Alex Rodriguez Park at Mark Light Field, a baseball stadium on the University of Miami campus in Coral Gables, Florida
