= Los Frikis (disambiguation) =

Los Frikis may refer to:

- Los Frikis - Los Frikis or the Frikis is a Cuban punk subculture that originated in the 1980s
- Los Frikis (film) - "Los Frikis" is a 2024 award-winning feature film based on true events, set in Cuba in the 1990s.
