= New Slate Ventures =

American media production company

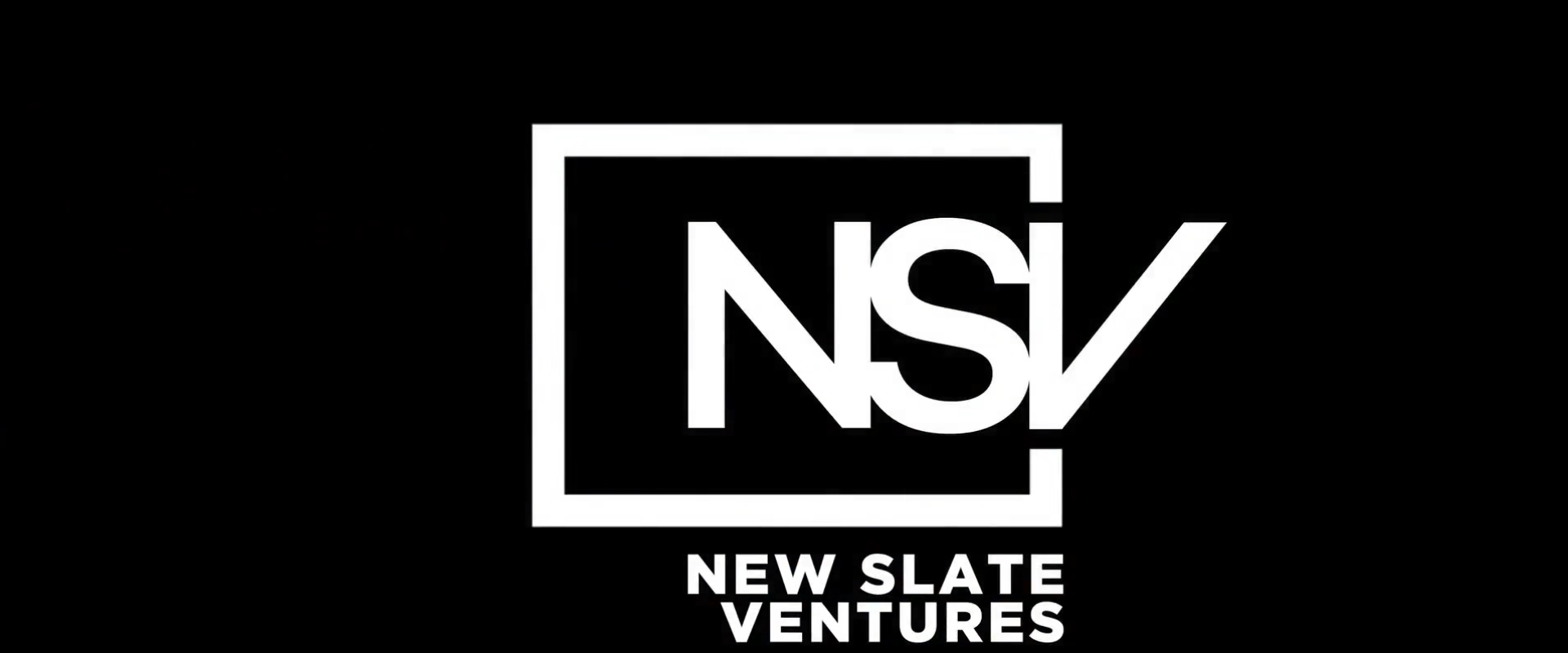
- Industry: Film industry
- Founded: 2019; 7 years ago
- Founder: Jordan Fudge
- Key people: Jeremy Allen

New Slate Ventures is an American film and television production company and film fund founded by Jordan Fudge. The company has produced films such as The Forty-Year-Old Version (2020), The 24th (2020), The United States vs. Billie Holiday (2021) and Los Frikis (2024).

== Overview ==
In 2019, Jordan Fudge founded New Slate Ventures, the media and entertainment arm of Los Angeles–based private equity firm Sinai Capital Partners, alongside partners Zach White and Jeremy Allen, with a focus on developing and financing projects that emphasize intersectional, inclusive, and culturally impactful storytelling. In 2020, New Slate Ventures announced that it had raised $100 million to invest in projects and expand its slate of original intellectual property.

Its 2020 slate included The Forty-Year-Old Version, produced by Lena Waithe and directed, written, and starring Radha Blank, which was acquired out of Sundance and released by Netflix; The United States vs. Billie Holiday, directed and co-written by Lee Daniels and starring Andra Day; and The 24th, directed and written by Kevin Willmott and starring Trai Byers, an official SXSW selection that premiered in August through Vertical Entertainment, and the rights to Den of Thieves, a non-fiction book by Pulitzer Prize-winning journalist James B. Stewart, which was optioned for adaptation into a limited series by Oscar-nominated screenwriter Terence Winter. Day's performance earned her an Academy Award nomination for Best Actress for The United States vs. Billie Holiday.

In 2022, New Slate Ventures joined as a production partner on the documentary Free Money, which explores the implementation of a universal basic income program in the Kenyan village of Kogutu and premiered at the Toronto International Film Festival.

In 2024, New Slate Ventures produced Los Firkins, a Spanish-language drama directed by Tyler Nilson and Michael Schwartz, which follows a group of young outcasts in 1990s Cuba who contract HIV to secure food during the country's "Special Period."

== Filmography ==
Year	Film	Notes
2025	Los Frikis	distributed by Wayward/Range Releasing
2024	Free Money	
2022	Icarus: The Aftermath	
2022	They Call Me Magic	distributed by Apple+
2021	The United States vs. Billie Holiday	distributed by Hulu
2020	The 24th	distributed by Vertical Entertainment
2020	The Forty-Year-Old Version	distributed by Netflix
