= Matthew Postlethwaite =

English actor, writer and singer (born 1991)

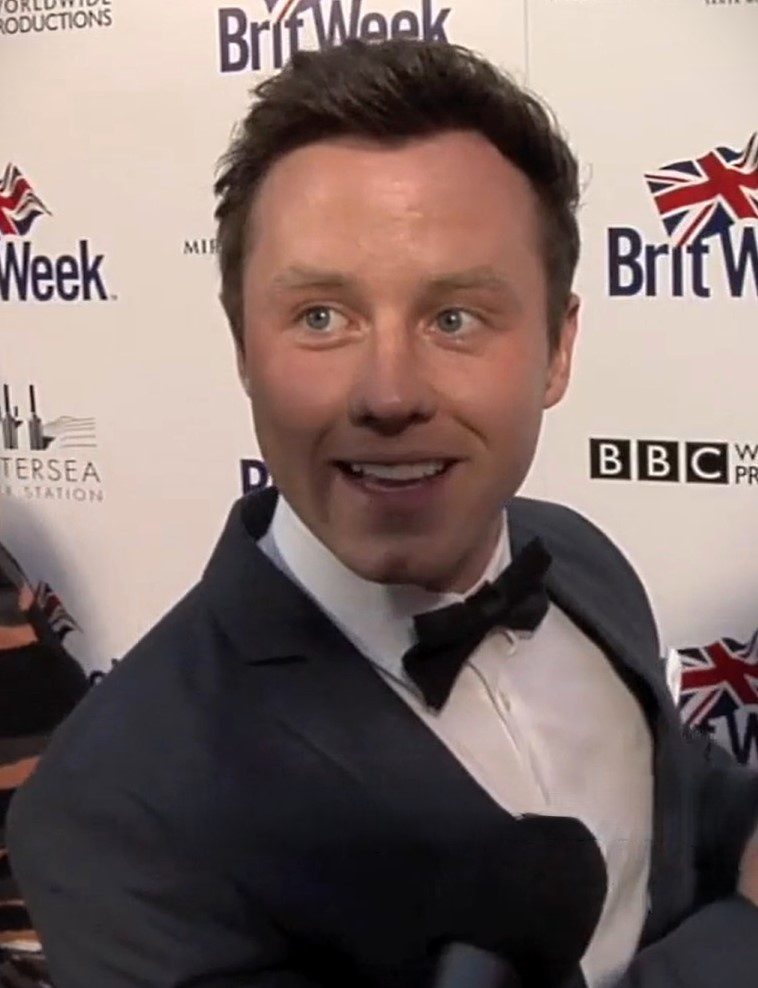
- Postlethwaite in 2015
- Born: 25 September 1991 (age 35); Whitehaven, Cumbria, England
- Education: University of Huddersfield
- Occupations: Actor; writer; producer; singer; artist
- Years active: 2014–present
- Known for: The Great Artist; Peaky Blinders; Shooting Clerks; The White King

Matthew Postlethwaite (born 25 September 1991 in Whitehaven, England) is a British actor, writer, singer, artist and entrepreneur. He produced, created and starred in the 2020 short film The Great Artist.

His production company, Purpose Co., has won over 120 awards and been nominated 55 times. His latest film The Great Artist qualified for consideration for the Live Action Short Film shortlist for the 93rd Academy Awards. He has an additional two features in development.

Postlethwaite is part of the BAFTA Ones to Watch program. Matthew is known to perform his own stunts in his appearances.

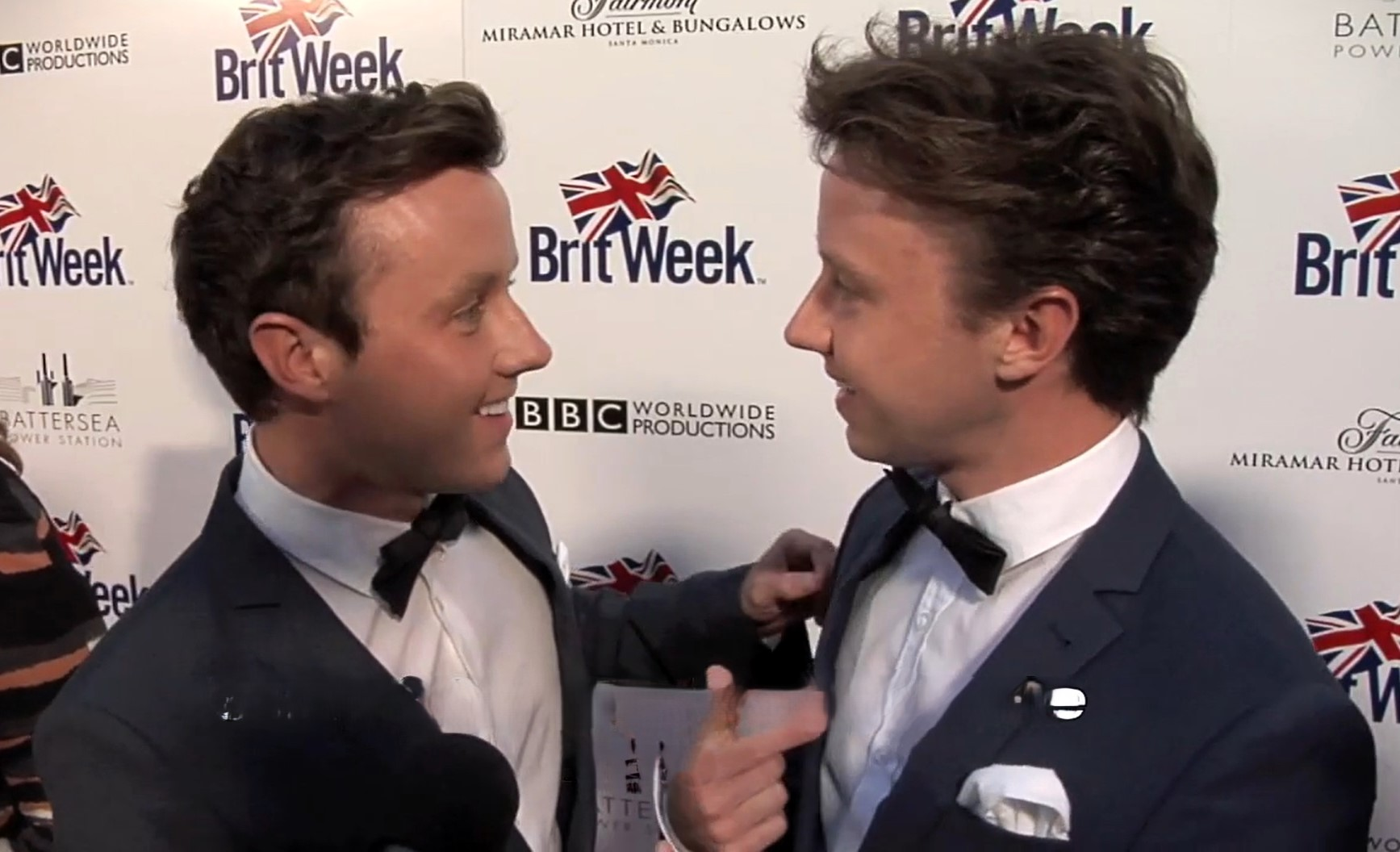
Matthew (left) and brother Jeffrey Postlethwaite at the Los Angeles BritWeek 2015 Red Carpet Launch Party

Postlethwaite appears, alongside his brother Jeffrey, on the front cover of the twelfth issue of Candid Magazine.

He had an art show in New York where his paintings were exhibited to the audience. Half of his paintings were featured in The Great Artist.

"Brave," the end credits song from the film (which he co-wrote with Jon Althman and Pia Toscano) won the Hollywood Music in Media Award for Best Original Song in a Short Film. This was the first time in the history of the award show that an original song for a live action short film was nominated by the HMMA and won.

== Early life ==
Postlethwaite was born (born 25 September 1991 in Whitehaven, Cumbria) The youngest of three boys, his parents Susan Postlethwaite, an HR Business Partner, Ian Postlethwaite a commercial diver. Matthew Postlethwaite was brought up in the Lake District and was educated St Bees School.

== Filmography ==
Matthew created, wrote, produced, and starred in The Great Artist, which was inspired by his experience from when he was admitted to the hospital in his 20s for feeling suicidal. Postlethwaite further added in an interview for Albuquerque Journal, "As I talk about it, it becomes easier. A lot of people are more open to talk about their struggles with mental health. We need to know that we’re not alone. That’s what we’re trying to do with the film. We’re trying to open the conversation.”.

He also sings the track “Loved Up Crazy” in the film and half of his paintings are featured.

== Entrepreneurship ==
Before becoming a famous actor, Matthew studied at Huddersfield University Graduating top of his school with Distinction, 1st Classification, The highest classification in British academia, and Top of his university. He was honored at his graduation ceremony for his excellence in academia. In order to pay for his degree courses, he worked on numerous television commercials, such as for Hell's Kitchen in 2012.

Postlethwaite is an entrepreneur who has launched and operated a number of ventures. He graduated valedictorian of University of Huddersfield studying Enterprise Development under the direction of Patrick Stuart.

As part of his degree course, he started a Mexican restaurant named Wrapik. In August 2012 he won a business start-up competition held by the Kirklees Council for this business.

He formed the Luxury Healthy Chocolate brand NUDE(r) Chocolate which is currently in over 300 stores in the US.

It was listed as number 37 by "Eat This, Not That!" 40 cool food brands to buy in 2020.

He is joint partners with Scott Postlethwaite and actor Mike Manning.

== Personal life ==
As of February 2015, Matthew lives part-time in Beverly Hills.

In 2018 Matthew Publicly announced he was Bisexual. Despite only dating women. Matthew had a previous public relationship with artist Meghan Trainor.

Matthew Postlethwaite married Erika Young on October 31, 2024, in Malibu.

== Charity ==
Matthew Postlethwaite as an Activist has worked with American Foundation of Suicide Prevention, National Alliance on Mental Illness CA (NAMI), National Suicide Prevention Lifeline, Movember, Kindred, Tethr, The Tramuto Foundation, and Stand with Impact. With The National Alliance on Mental Illness (NAMI) further sponsoring his film The Great Artist at the Julien Dubuque International Film Festival.

Matthew Postlethwaite created with his brother Jeffrey Postlethwaite their own non-profit coffee brand named 'Hero Bean'. They partnered with Padre Fabretto Foundation and Bruce and Luke's Coffee Roasters to purchase coffee beans from Nicaraguan farmers at "30 per cent more than they would normally be paid for the fair trade price of coffee".

== Awards and recognition ==
His song, "Brave," from The Great Artist won the HMMA for Best Original Song for a Short Film. This was the first time in the history of award show that an original song for a live action short film was nominated by the HMMA and won.

Acting

Awards
Award	Category	Result
Festigious International Film Festival	December Award - Best Picture	Won
Festigious International Film Festival	December Award - Best Actor	Won
Los Angeles Film Awards	LAFA December Award - Best Actor	Nominated
Los Angeles Film Awards	LAFA December Award - Honorable Mention - Best Actor	Won
TopShorts Film Festival	December Award - Best Actor	Won

Producing

Awards
Award	Category	Result
Festigious International Film Festival	December Award - Best Picture	Won
TopShorts Film Festival	Film of the Month - December 2020	Won
TopShorts Film Festival	December Award - Best Narrative Film	Nominated
TopShorts Film Festival	December Award - Best Drama Film	Won
TopShorts Film Festival	December Award - Best LGBTQ Film	Won
Los Angeles Film Awards	LAFA December Award - Best Narrative Feature	Nominated
Los Angeles Film Awards	LAFA December Award - Best Drama	Won

Song Writing

Awards
Award	Category	Result
Aphrodite Film Awards	December Edition Award - Best Piece of Music (Only Music)	Semi-Finalist
International Music Video Underground	Best Lyrics Written for Song	Nominated
International Music Video Underground	Best Original Song	Nominated
New York International Film Awards	November Monthly Award - Best Song	Won
Queen Palm International Film Festival	Fourth Quarter Performance - Best Original Song	Nominated
World International Film Festival	Best Song	Nominated
11th Hollywood Music in Media Awards	Best Original Song – Short Film	Won
Atlanta Award-Qualifying Film Festival	Best Original Song	Nominated
Athens International Monthly Art Film Festival	Honorable Mention - Best Original Song	Won
Beyond the Curve International Film Festival	December Award - Best Original Song	Nominated
