= The White King (film) =

2016 British science fiction-drama film

- Directed by: Alex Helfrecht; Jörg Tittel
- Screenplay by: Alex Helfrecht; Jörg Tittel
- Based on: The White King by György Dragomán
- Produced by: Alex Helfrecht; Jörg Tittel; Philip Munger; Teun Hilte
- Starring: Lorenzo Allchurch; Olivia Williams; Ólafur Darri Ólafsson; Jonathan Pryce
- Cinematography: René Richter
- Edited by: Peter R. Adam
- Music by: Joanna Bruzdowicz
- Production company: Oiffy
- Distributed by: Signature Entertainment (UK); Vertigo Media (HU)
- Release dates: 18 June 2016 (Edinburgh International Film Festival 2016); 21 January 2017 (United Kingdom)
- Running time: 89 minutes
- Countries: United Kingdom (production); Hungary (shooting)
- Language: English

The White King is a 2016 British science fiction-drama film written and directed by Alex Helfrecht and Jörg Tittel. It is an adaptation of the novel of the same name written by György Dragomán and follows Djata (Lorenzo Allchurch) growing up in a dictatorship, without access to the rest of the world, while dealing with persecution against him and his parents by the government. It had its world premiere at the Edinburgh International Film Festival and its international premiere at the Tallinn Black Nights Film Festival.

== Plot ==
The film follows Djata (Lorenzo Allchurch), a 12-year-old boy growing up in a dystopian territory called Homeland, under a dictatorship and without access to the rest of the world. His father, Peter (Ross Partridge), tells him of the true nature of Homeland as well as of a treasure guarded by a man named Pickaxe (Ólafur Darri Ólafsson). Peter is later taken away by two government agents, leading to him and Djata's mother, Hannah (Agyness Deyn), being labelled traitors by the government and the citizenry.

For his birthday, Djata visits his father's parents who are devoted to the totalitarian government. Once there, his grandfather shows him a gun and orders him to kill a cat. When Djata hesitates, his grandmother presses him to shoot. Later that night his grandfather gives him a medal his father won as a boy for being a great shooter. When Djata returns home his mother gives him a birthday cake but notices Djata is hiding something. When she sees the medal she is angered that he accepted a gift from his grandparents. She yells at him that she won't let his grandparents brainwash him and sends him to his room.

The next day, while Djata is playing with his friends with the football his father gave him, two bullies known as "the twins", Romulus and Remus, drive up to them, force candy on them and take Djata's ball. Later Djata and his mother are standing on a line at the local market, but when they try to buy food they are turned away because they have been blacklisted. Djata is sitting in his hangout when an older boy throws a dead bird with a note through the window. Djata and his friends see the note is an invitation by the bullies to fight to get his ball back. During the fight the next day, Djata manages to get into the bullies' base, but he is caught by the twins who try to intimidate him into saying that the ball is theirs. He refuses, breaks free and escapes with his football.

When Djata returns home, his mother is trying to find a way to find his father. She asks her father-in-law for help but he refuses. Djata and his mother then visit the local General to ask for help. At her home, General Meade sends Djata out of the room so she can discuss "business" with his mother. Djata wanders through the building and finds a female android who plays chess (linking back to the film's opening sequence which included shots of Djata and his father playing chess), but he then hears his mother fighting off advances by the General. They demand to leave, and the General lets them go, but only after telling Djata that he will die like his father. When they get back home Djata's mother tries to find anything and everything she can sell to buy his father's freedom. Djata stops his mother and tells her everything will be okay.

Djata decides to go with his best friend to find the treasure his father told him about. When they find the cave, it's not full of treasure but scattered human skeletons and other rubbish. His friend becomes angry and pushes Djata into the pit. Pickaxe finds him and tells him the government put him there to guard their secrets. Before sending him home, Pickaxe asks Djata what he's willing to sacrifice to find his father; he shows Djata that he has no eyes, and hugs him farewell.

As Djata leaves the forest, his grandfather finds him and in a panic and scolds him for making him and his mother worry. While driving Djata home, Colonel Fitz pulls over and tells him that all he wanted for his father was a better life. He tells Djata he's been trying all this time to find Djata's father, but to no avail, and that despite his loyalty and service to the Homeland, he in fact hates how cruel and unforgiving the regime is. The Colonel tells Djata that he and his mother need to escape the country. He returns Djata home to his mother but then collapses and dies from a heart attack.

At the funeral, Djata and his mother are refused seats at the front of the meeting hall. In the middle of the eulogy given by Djata's grandmother, Djata's father is brought in, in chains. His grandmother appears shaken by his appearance. Djata and his mother run to him and embrace him until a guard breaks it up. Djata's mother screams at the guard; Djata's father lunges at the guard and is dragged out. Djata's mother is knocked down and Djata picks up a stick to chase after the guards dragging his father away. Djata knocks a guard down, but he can't catch the guards holding his father who is thrown into a truck which drives away. Djata runs after them while his mother tries to follow on her bicycle. As Djata runs behind the truck, his mother riding behind him, the film ends.

== Cast ==
- Lorenzo Allchurch as Djata
- Olivia Williams as Sophia (voice)
- Ólafur Darri Ólafsson as Pickaxe
- Jonathan Pryce as Colonel Fitz
- Fiona Shaw as Kathrin Fitz
- Greta Scacchi as General Meade
- Agyness Deyn as Hannah
- Clare-Hope Ashitey as Gaby
- Ross Partridge as Peter
- Derek de Lint as Silver Hair
- Jeffrey Postlethwaite as Romulus Frunza
- Matthew Postlethwaite as Remus Frunza
- Malachi Hallett as Shabby

== Production ==
The White King was adapted from the 2008 Hungarian novel of the same name, written by György Dragomán. The film was directed and written by Alex Helfrecht and Jörg Tittel and was shot in Hungary. Its production started in June 2015 as principal photography began for the film, where it used settings such as a former Soviet air force base. The directors first became aware of the book when Helfrecht was working in London, and became emotionally invested in the book after only a few pages. While the novel takes place in Romania under the dictatorial rule of Nicolae Ceaușescu (where author György Dragomán grew up) with added elements of magic realism, the film is set in a nondescript fictional dystopia. The directors intentionally portrayed the dystopian setting's nature as beautiful rather than dismal. They also wanted to make a story where the viewer is granted as little information as the protagonist. However, the directors opted to include an animated sequence at the beginning that "tells the story through the language of propaganda, the symbols that will be seen through the film." For this, they sought out the animation studio Spov, which had worked on content in the Call of Duty and Titanfall video game series.

== Release ==
The film received its world premiere at the Edinburgh International Film Festival 2016 on 18 June 2016. It was also featured at the Tallinn Black Nights Film Festival as part of its "First Features Competition" alongside 13 other films; it was its international debut.

== Reception ==
The White King has received generally positive reception; it holds an average rating on Rotten Tomatoes of 71%, based on 21 reviews. It also received a nomination for the "Michael Powell Award for Best British Feature Film" and "The Award for Best Performance in a British Feature Film" at the Edinburgh International Film Festival. Neil Young, writing for The Hollywood Reporter, felt that the film was intriguing but ended on an unsatisfying note; he however felt that lead actor Lorenzo Allchurch did a quality job, given his inexperience, and that he hopes to see more out of him in the future. Charles Gant of Screen Daily compared the film to the novel 1984, similarly giving Allchurch praise for his performance. Gant felt that while it succeeds at presenting the world in the tone that it wants, it suffers somewhat from a relatively weak narrative due to the novel being a "loose collection of stories. Writer Emma Simmonds called it a "moderately successful dystopian adventure," similarly comparing it to 1984 but also The Hunger Games and The Goonies. She felt that it may have a good appeal to older teens. MaryAnn Johanson of Flick Filosopher, however, commented: "This sad mess of a vaguely sci-fi coming-of-age tale seemingly could not be more plugged into current fears, and yet it feels utterly irrelevant."
