= They Call Me Magic =

American Documentary TV series

- Promotional poster
- Genre: Documentary; Biographical; Sport
- Directed by: Rick Famuyiwa
- Country of origin: United States
- Original language: English
- No. of episodes: 4

Production
- Executive producers: Jordan Fudge; Jeremy Allen; Bryn Mooser; Christina McLarty
- Production companies: XTR; New Slate Ventures; Delirio Films; H.Wood Media

Original release
- Network: Apple TV+
- Release: April 22, 2022

They Call Me Magic is a four-part American documentary television miniseries about the life and career of basketball player Earvin "Magic" Johnson. It features interviews with Johnson, his family, and public figures including Michael Jordan, Shaquille O'Neal, Snoop Dogg, Samuel L. Jackson, and former U.S. President Barack Obama.

The series was directed by Rick Famuyiwa and produced by XTR and New Slate Ventures, in association with Delirio Films, and H.Wood Media for Apple TV+.

== Premise ==
They Call Me Magic offers an in-depth look at Earvin "Magic" Johnson's life, from his early years in Lansing, Michigan; his rise to NBA stardom with the Los Angeles Lakers; to his HIV diagnosis and how that changed public perceptions; and his later work as a business mogul and community activist. It includes interviews with Johnson, family, peers and various public figures.

== Production ==
They Call Me Magic was directed by Rick Famuyiwa, with Jordan Fudge, Jeremy Allen, Bryn Mooser and Christina McLarty serving as executive producers. Johnson stated that the idea for the documentary series was partly inspired by the success of Michael Jordan’s The Last Dance. While Jordan’s series focused primarily on athletic achievements, Johnson wanted his documentary to place greater emphasis on his family life, personal relationships, and different stages of his career.

== Episodes ==
No.	Title	Original release date
1	"June Bug"	April 22, 2022
2	"Buck"	April 22, 2022
3	"Earvin"	April 22, 2022
4	"Magic"	April 22, 2022

== Release ==
A trailer for the series was released on March 12, 2022, featuring interviews and archival footage set to Sugarhill Gang's Apache and Norah Jones' My Heart Is Full (Silo x Bettina Bergstrom Remix). It had its premiered at the South by Southwest festival in the same month, and all four episodes became available on Apple TV+ on April 22, 2022.

== Reception ==
On Rotten Tomatoes, They Call Me Magic has a 69% approval rating based on 13 critic reviews. The critics consensus states: "They Call Me Magic is too overextended to be truly spellbinding, but Magic Johnson proves a charming narrator of his own life in a docuseries that should be mandatory viewing for basketball fans."

It was nominated for a Primetime Emmy Awards for Outstanding Music Composition for a Documentary Series or Special (Original Dramatic Score), with composer Terence Blanchard credited.
