= Héctor Medina (actor) =

Cuban actor

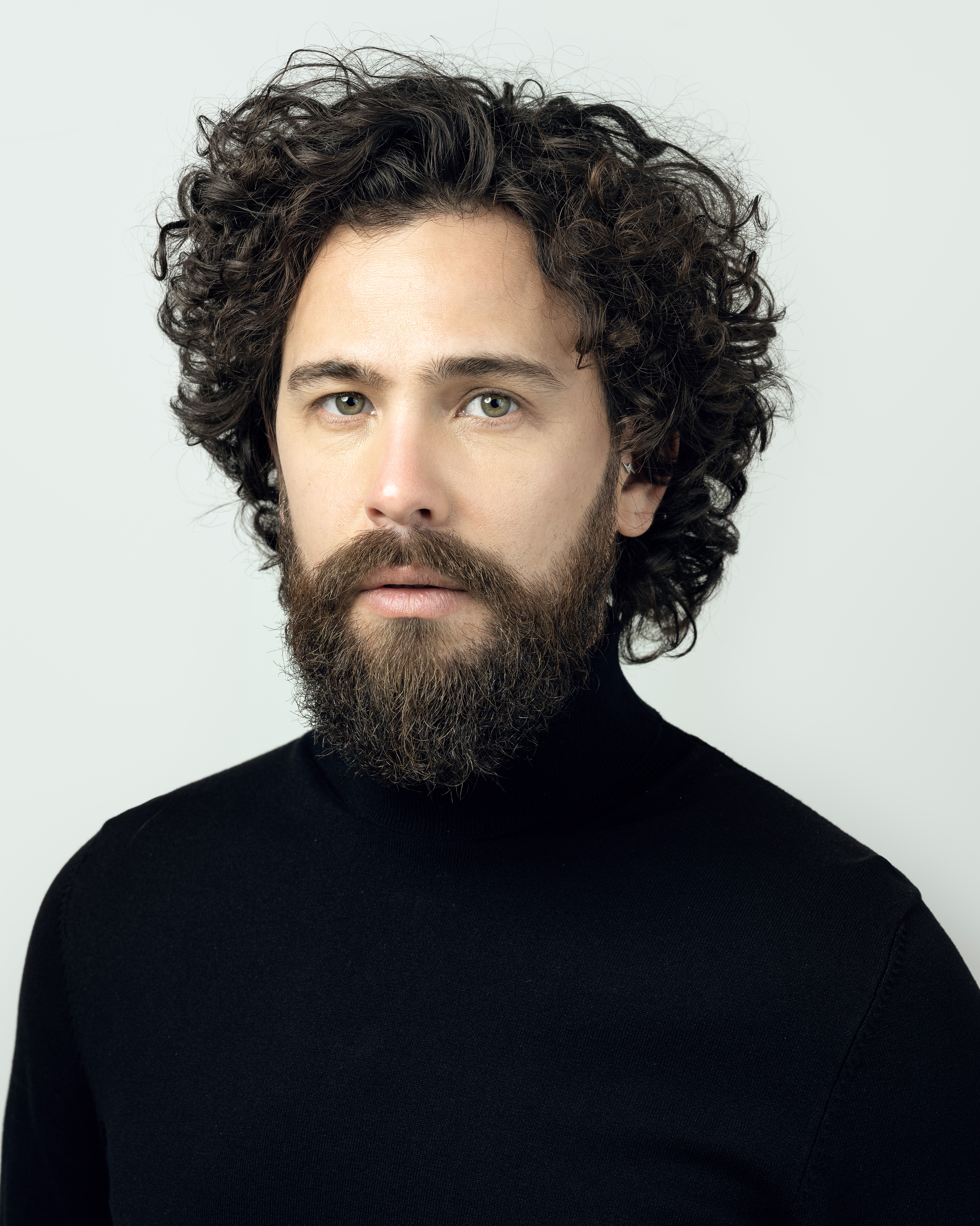
- Profile
- Born: Héctor Medina Valdés; 1989 (age 36–37); Pinar del Río
- Citizenship: Cuba
- Education: National School of Art
- Occupation: Actor
- Years active: 2009 -
- Known for: Viva, Ticket to Paradise, Los Frikis
- Website: https://www.imdb.com/name/nm5794678/?ref_=nm_mv_close

Héctor Medina is Cuban theatre, television and film actor. He is known for some notable Cuban international film coproductions in recent years.

== Biography ==
Hector Medina was born in Pinar del Río, Cuba on September 10, 1989. Shortly after graduating from that country’s select National School of Art (ENA), he earned a place in the prestigious theatre company, El Público. From the beginning of his career, Medina starred in many landmark Cuban films such as Boleto al Paraíso (Ticket to Paradise, 2010) and La Cosa Humana (The Human Thing, 2011). By 2015, Medina became internationally recognized as a rising talent while working on The King of Havana, by acclaimed Spanish director Agustí Villaronga. Later in 2016, he was featured as a guest star in Netflix’s Four Seasons in Havana.

Currently, Medina lives in Miami where he recently enjoyed acclaim starring in Telemundo’s Sangre de mi Tierra (Blood from My Country, 2017). A juror at the Miami International Film Festival (HBO’s Contest), he was later invited as a guest actor in 2018's Sundance Lab. Medina received acclaim for his role as Jesús, the lead character in Viva, the award-winning 2015 film distributed by Magnolia Pictures, directed by Irishman Paddy Breathnch. He has had a successful career in the theater scene in Miami, participating in successful works such as The Amparo Experience and Papás Fritos. His most recent work is the Lord Miller Productions' Los Frikis, written and directed by Tyler Nilson and Michael Schwartz; Medina stars in the role of Paco and is an executive producer.

== Filmography ==
Feature films and television
Year	Title	Role	Notes	Ref.
2011	Ticket to Paradise	Alejandro	Film	
2013	Esther en alguna parte	Ismael	Film	
2014	Una historia con Cristo y Jesús	Cristo	Short film	
2015	Viva	Jesús	Film	
2015	El rey de La Habana (The King of Havana)	Yunisleidi	Film	
2016	Vientos de la Habana	Lázaro	Film	
2017	El hombre que cuida	Alex	Film	
2017	Leyendas del Exilio	Actor	TV series	
2017	Sangre de mi tierra	Leonardo Castañeda	TV series	
2022	Borrowed	Justin	Film	
2024	Los Frikis (film)	Paco	Film	

== Awards and nominations ==
Medina received the Adolfo Llauradó Award for Best Actor by the National Union of Writers and Artists of Cuba and the Award for Best Actor at the Ibero-American Film and Video Festival in Fortaleza, Brazil for his role of Alejandro in Ticket to Paradise. He also won the Best Performance award for the role of Paco in Los Frikis at the San Antonio Film Festival in 2024.
