= The Great Artist =

2020 American short film

- Official film poster
- Directed by: Indrani Pal-Chaudhuri
- Screenplay by: Matthew Postlethwaite; Sunny Vachher
- Produced by: Sunny Vachher; Matthew Postlethwaite
- Starring: Matthew Postlethwaite; Marimar Vega; Rain Valdez; Benjamin Patterson
- Cinematography: Ray Wongchinda
- Edited by: Sean Olson
- Music by: Richi Carter (Original Score By); Jon Altham (Original Song By)
- Production company: Purpose Co.
- Release date: December 31, 2020 (TopShorts Film Festival)
- Running time: 23 min
- Country: United States
- Language: English

The Great Artist is a 2020 American short drama film directed by Indrani Pal-Chaudhuri and written and produced by Sunny Vachher and Matthew Postlethwaite. Starring Matthew Postlethwaite, the rest of the cast includes Marimar Vega, Rain Valdez and Benjamin Patterson.

The film was produced during the COVID-19 pandemic and enjoyed a successful festival run, which began virtually on December 31, 2020 in that month's edition of the 2020 TopShorts Film Festival. This resulted in it winning and being nominated for numerous awards, including for Postlethwaite's performance, Indrani Pal-Chaudhuri's directing, Richi Carter's score and the original song "Brave" (which was written by Matthew Postlethwaite, Jon Altham and Pia Toscano; performed by Pia Toscano), which made history as the first song from a live-action short film to win the Hollywood Music in Media Award for Outstanding Song Written for Visual Media (Short Film). It screened at the Emerging Filmmaker Showcase at Cannes Film Festival. The film qualified for consideration for the Live Action Short Film Shortlist for the 93rd Academy Awards and was selected by The Hollywood Reporter as one of the Oscars' Top 5 Live Action Shorts.

== Premise ==
A gifted artist finds himself in a broken balance between creating world class art and the all too silent struggle of self care as his life begins to unravel because of his Dissociative Identity Disorder.

== Cast ==
- Matthew Postlethwaite as The Great Artist
- Marimar Vega as Perry
- Rain Valdez as Angela
- Benjamin Patterson as Charlie
- Kalena Ranoa as Odette
- Addison Brasil as Henry Austin
- Julia Black as The Host

== Production ==
=== Development and pre-production ===
Postlethwaite created the story and wrote the film with Vachher at the beginning of January 2020 as a way to bring awareness to mental health, inspired by Postlethwaite’s experience when he was admitted to the hospital in his 20s for feeling suicidal. Postlethwaite further added in an interview for Albuquerque Journal, "As I talk about it, it becomes easier. A lot of people are more open to talk about their struggles with mental health. We need to know that we’re not alone. That’s what we’re trying to do with the film. We’re trying to open the conversation.” Later that year, Postlethwaite and Producer Sunny Vachher's production company, Purpose Co., received the green-light from SAG-AFTRA to move forward with production, and received endorsements from various major mental health organizations.

The film has the support of major organizations such as GLAAD, American Foundation of Suicide Prevention, National Suicide Prevention Lifeline, Movember, Kindred, Tethr, The Tramuto Foundation, and Stand with Impact, with the National Alliance on Mental Illness (NAMI) further sponsoring the film at the Julien Dubuque International Film Festival.

=== Filming ===
Filming took place in Los Angeles, California with COVID-19 safety protocols in place, with production ending with zero positive cases for the virus.

== Reception ==
"It is the climax that is truly brilliant -- one that earned the film a consideration for the Live Action Short Film shortlist for the 93rd Academy Awards...Are we all striving to achieve 'greatness' by holding our authentic self hostage? This is the haunting question that Pal-Chaudhuri leaves her viewers with," according to Prerna Mittra of The Indian Express.

Markos Papadatos of Digital Journal was positive about the film and praised Postlethwaite's performance, writing that "...he is not afraid to be raw and vulnerable, where one can really hear his heart in this short movie. He layers his emotions well and he delves beyond the surface to bring this complex character to life." He then went on to add that "It truly underscores the fact that for great art to be produced, there needs to be major suffering. Viewers are bound to find it warm, heartfelt, and relatable, especially in the era of COVID-19."

Christopher Henry of The Blunt Post praised the directing, cinematography, writing and performances, concluding his review that "It manages not only to humanize not only the illness of DID but to humanize the idea of an artist as well. That behind the carefully constructed work of beauty, lies the turmoil and sorrow that one had to endure to produce it."

== Accolades ==
Awards
| Year | Award | Category | Recipients | Result |
|---|---|---|---|---|
| 2020 | Aphrodite Film Awards | December Edition Award - Best Piece of Music (Only Music) | Jon Altham, Pia Toscano and Matthew Postlethwaite (for "Brave") | Semi-Finalist |
| 2020 | Athens International Monthly Art Film Festival | Honorable Mention - Best Original Song | Jon Altham, Pia Toscano and Matthew Postlethwaite (for "Brave") | Won |
| 2020 | Beyond the Curve International Film Festival | December Award - Best Original Song | Jon Altham, Pia Toscano and Matthew Postlethwaite (for "Brave") | Nominated |
| 2020 | Calcutta International Cult Film Festival | Golden Fox Award - Best Film Score - Soundtrack | Richi Carter | Nominated |
| 2020 | Calcutta International Cult Film Festival | Best Film Score - Soundtrack | Richi Carter | Won |
| 2020 | Festigious International Film Festival | December Award - Best Picture | The Great Artist | Won |
| 2020 | Festigious International Film Festival | December Award - Best Actor | Matthew Postlethwaite | Won |
| 2020 | Festigious International Film Festival | Festival Award - Best Original Score | Richi Carter | Won |
| 2020 | Global Film Festival Awards | December Award - Best Composer | Richi Carter | Won |
| 2020 | Global Music Awards | Outstanding Musical Achievement For Female Voice | Pia Toscano (for "Brave") | Won |
| 2020 | International Music Video Underground | Best Lyrics Written for Song | Jon Altham, Pia Toscano and Matthew Postlethwaite (for "Brave") | Nominated |
| 2020 | International Music Video Underground | Best Original Song | Jon Altham, Pia Toscano and Matthew Postlethwaite (for "Brave") | Nominated |
| 2020 | Los Angeles Film Awards | LAFA December Award - Best Narrative Feature | The Great Artist | Nominated |
| 2020 | Los Angeles Film Awards | LAFA December Award - Best Drama | The Great Artist | Won |
| 2020 | Los Angeles Film Awards | LAFA December Award - Best LGBTQ Film | The Great Artist | Nominated |
| 2020 | Los Angeles Film Awards | LAFA December Award - Best Actor | Matthew Postlethwaite | Nominated |
| 2020 | Los Angeles Film Awards | LAFA December Award - Honorable Mention - Best Actor | Matthew Postlethwaite | Won |
| 2020 | Los Angeles Film Awards | Festival Award - Best Score | Richi Carter | Won |
| 2020 | New York International Film Awards | November Monthly Award - Best Song | Jon Altham, Pia Toscano and Matthew Postlethwaite (for "Brave") | Won |
| 2020 | Queen Palm International Film Festival | Fourth Quarter Performance - Best Original Song | Jon Altham, Pia Toscano and Matthew Postlethwaite (for "Brave") | Nominated |
| 2020 | Queen Palm International Film Festival | Fourth Quarter Performance - Best Music | Richi Carter | Nominated |
| 2020 | TopShorts Film Festival | Film of the Month - December 2020 | The Great Artist | Won |
| 2020 | TopShorts Film Festival | December Award - Best Narrative Film | The Great Artist | Nominated |
| 2020 | TopShorts Film Festival | December Award - Best Drama Film | The Great Artist | Won |
| 2020 | TopShorts Film Festival | December Award - Best LGBTQ Film | The Great Artist | Won |
| 2020 | TopShorts Film Festival | December Award - Best Actor | Matthew Postlethwaite | Won |
| 2020 | TopShorts Film Festival | December Award - Best Score | Richi Carter | Won |
| 2020 | Toronto Independent Film Festival of Cift | December Award - Best Female Director | Indrani Pal-Chaudhuri | Won |
| 2020 | World International Film Festival | Best Song | Jon Altham, Pia Toscano and Matthew Postlethwaite (for "Brave") | Nominated |
| 2021 | 11th Hollywood Music in Media Awards | Best Original Song — Short Film | Jon Altham, Pia Toscano and Matthew Postlethwaite (for "Brave") | Won |
| 2021 | Atlanta Award-Qualifying Film Festival | Best Original Song | Jon Altham, Pia Toscano and Matthew Postlethwaite (for "Brave") | Nominated |
