= Rain Valdez =

American actress, writer, and producer (born 1981)

- Born: 1981 (age 44–45); Manila, Philippines
- Occupations: Actress, writer, producer

Rain Valdez (born 1981) is an American actress, writer, and producer who rose to prominence with her award-winning short film, Ryans. She stars in the web series Razor Tongue, which she created and which has earned her a Primetime Emmy nomination in Outstanding Actress in a Short Form Comedy or Drama Series.

Valdez got her start playing Coco in season 2 of TV Land's Lopez. She consulted on Transparent and guest starred in the show's fourth season. She has written for Vice and Popsugar.

== Early life ==
Valdez was born in Manila, Philippines and was raised by her mother and stepfather in Dededo, Guam. She began writing poems and short stories as a junior high school student. She attended Simon Sanchez High School in Yigo before moving to Los Angeles in 2000, waiting tables and modeling to support herself while studying acting.

== Career ==
Valdez began her career as a producer's assistant in 2006. In 2010, she wrote and starred in her first short, Silly Games. In 2017, she wrote and starred in her breakthrough short film, Ryans, which premiered at Outfest and was given the Jury Award for Best North American Short. The same year, she was cast in TV Land's Lopez, with a recurring role. Also in 2017, Valdez was cast for Amazon's Transparent. In 2019, Valdez created Razor Tongue, an indie episodic romantic comedy, and co-starring such actors as Alexandra Grey, Sterling Jones, Sarah Parlow, Carmen Scott, and Shaan Dasani. The 7-part web series, which she wrote and stars in, had its international premiere in Toronto at InsideOut Film Festival, its US premiere in San Francisco at Frameline Film Festival of June 2019, as well as, premiering in LA at the Outfest Film Festival. Her writing and performance in the romcom short film Ryans earned her a Best North American Short Film Award at OUTSouth Queer Film Festival and Hexed earned her 3 nominations for Best Director, Best Actress and Best Short at the Madrid International Film Festival. She is the Trailblazer Award recipient at the 2021 Outfest Legacy Awards.

In 2020, Valdez appeared as a commentator in the Netflix documentary Disclosure alongside actors Laverne Cox, Jen Richards, Zeke Smith, Leo Sheng, Alexandra Billings, and others. In July 2020, she was nominated for a Primetime Emmy Award for Outstanding Actress in a Short Form Comedy or Drama Series for her work on Razor Tongue. In October 2020, she co-starred in the short film The Great Artist, which qualified for the Best Live Action Short Film shortlist for the 93rd Academy Awards. She is currently working on her first feature Re-Live. “Re-Live” tells the story of Rowena, a transgender movie star who returns to her home in Guam for her high school reunion's “do-over week.”

== Activism ==
Valdez has been a featured speaker at conferences such as The New School's The Festival of the New, and WrapWomen's BE Conference.

Rain is also the founder of ActNOW, the first and only acting class in Los Angeles prioritizing a safe space for LGBTQIA actors and teaches beyond the binary.

== Personal life ==
Valdez is a trans woman. She initially began her career closeted, eventually deciding to live as an openly trans individual, with her stint on Transparent as her first role as an openly trans woman.

On being an out trans woman, and her experience being closeted she had this to say, "My years living stealth were a privilege. Safety and ignorance is a privilege. If not everyone in my community can have that choice, then why should I? This is the moment I felt proudest as an out trans woman. The moment I realized I can never go back because of the stamps I've been creating for myself. Instead of fear or disappointment, it gave me peace to know that there can no longer be room in my heart and soul for my own internal transphobia. There's no more room for hesitation when it comes to my part in our fight for equality. Going stealth would not solve anything, at least not for me."

== Podcasts ==
Date	Show	Episode
Sept. 18, 2020	Yellow Glitter Podcast	"Moving mountains and the importance of visibility with Rain Valdez"
Feb. 26, 2020	The Her Voice Podcast	"Rain Valdez"
Oct. 1, 2019	Good Morning LaLa Land	"Rain Valdez"
Aug. 30, 2019	Do Me A Solid	"RAIN VALDEZ"
Jan. 2019	FilAm Creative Voices	"Episode 17: Rain Valdez"

== See also ==
- List of transgender film and television directors
