= Allyn Rachel =

American actress, writer and comedian

- Born: Pikesville, Maryland, U.S.
- Occupations: Actress, comedian, writer
- Years active: 2011–present

Allyn Rachel is an American actress, writer and comedian, best known for her roles in a variety of national commercials and as the voice of "Bee" in the Netflix animated series, Bee and PuppyCat.

== Life and career ==
Allyn was born in Pikesville, Maryland, she attended The Park School of Baltimore, and she began doing theatre at Maryland's Center Stage while still in high school. She went on to graduate from the Tisch School of the Arts at New York University, with a BFA in Drama.

In 2011, Allyn was selected to perform in the New Faces: Characters Showcase at the Just For Laughs Comedy Festival in Montreal. Around that same time, she began appearing in a number of heavily aired national commercials (Toyota, eBay, McDonald's, Wal-Mart, IHOP, Dish Network, to name a few).

Allyn is a regular sketch comedy performer at the Upright Citizens Brigade Theatre in Los Angeles.

She is the voice of "Bee" in the Netflix animated series Bee and PuppyCat, created through Frederator Studios' Cartoon Hangover.

== Filmography ==
=== Film ===
Film
Year	Title	Role	Notes
2014	A Million Ways to Die in the West	Wild Girl	
2014	Million Dollar Arm	Theresa	
2016	Loudini	Sandy	Short film
2017	Kong: Skull Island	Secretary O'Brien	
2018	Instant Family	Kim	
2020	Valley Girl	Rachel Donahue	

=== Television ===
Television
Year	Title	Role	Notes
2011	Workaholics	Bridesmaid	Episode: "Karl's Wedding"
2012	Weeds	Monica	4 episodes
2013–2016	Bee and PuppyCat	Bee (voice)	Main role
2013–2014	Comedy Bang! Bang!	Darla Gardner	Episode: "Rainn Wilson Wears a Short Sleeved Plaid Shirt & Colorful Sneakers"
2013–2014	Comedy Bang! Bang!	Female Fan	Episode: "Dane Cook Wears a Black Blazer & Tailored Pants"
2014	New Girl	Rachael	Episode: "Sister"
2014	Selfie	Bryn	5 episodes
2015	Togetherness	Head Hipster	Episode: "Kick the Can"
2015	Your Pretty Face Is Going to Hell	Joanna	Episode: "True Love Will Find You"
2016–2017	The Good Place	Betsy	2 Episodes
2022	Bee and PuppyCat: Lazy in Space	Bee (voice)	Main role
