= Adria Arjona =

American actress (born 1992)

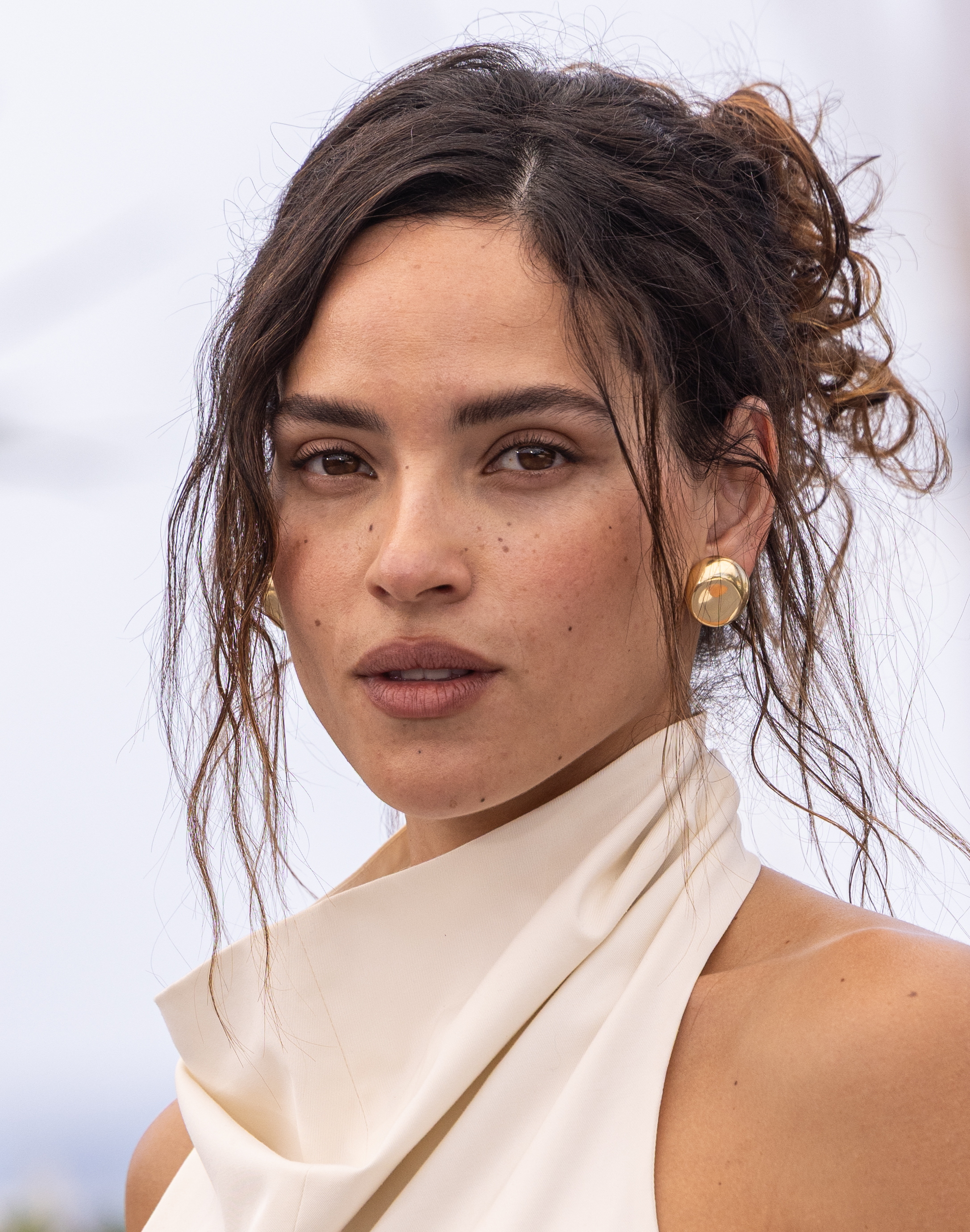
- Arjona in 2025
- Born: Adria Arjona Torres; April 25, 1992 (age 34); San Juan, Puerto Rico
- Citizenship: United States
- Education: Lee Strasberg Theatre and Film Institute
- Occupation: Actress
- Years active: 2012–present
- Spouse: Edgardo Canales (m. 2019; div. 2023)
- Father: Ricardo Arjona

Signature
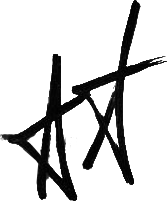

Adria Arjona Torres (Latin American Spanish: [ˈaðɾja aɾˈxona]; 25 April 1992) is an American actress. She played Dorothy Gale in the Oz book adaptation Emerald City (2017), Anathema Device in Good Omens (2019), and Bix Caleen in Andor (2022–2025). She has starred in Father of the Bride (2022), Hit Man (2023), and Blink Twice (2024) with supporting roles in Pacific Rim Uprising, Life of the Party (both 2018), Triple Frontier (2019), 6 Underground (2019) and Morbius (2022).

== Early life ==
Arjona was born in San Juan, Puerto Rico, but raised in Mexico City until she was twelve. Her mother, Leslie Torres, is Puerto Rican, and her father, Ricardo Arjona, is a Guatemalan singer-songwriter. Arjona reflected on her heritage during an interview with The New York Times: "There's a big debate on the internet over whether I'm Puerto Rican or Guatemalan, and I'm very much both". When she was a child, her father took her along on his tours. At age 12, she moved to Miami with her mother following her parents' divorce. She lived there until she was 18, when she moved to New York City on her own. There, she worked as a waitress and hostess while studying acting at the Lee Strasberg Theatre and Film Institute.

== Career ==
Arjona's early television roles include Emily in season two of the anthology television series True Detective (2015) and Dani Silva in two episodes of the television series Person of Interest (in 2014 and 2015). She later starred in Emerald City as Dorothy Gale and played Anathema Device in the mini-series Good Omens. She appeared as a minor character in the film Triple Frontier, released in March 2019, and later in a starring role in the movie 6 Underground, released in December 2019. She had a supporting role alongside Jason Momoa in the film Sweet Girl, which was released on Netflix in October 2021.

In December 2018, she entered negotiations in the Sony spinoff Morbius to portray the film's female lead Martine Bancroft, and her involvement was confirmed at the end of January. The director of the film, Daniel Espinosa, felt that Arjona was perfect for the role stating: "It was clear—the part was hers". Upon its release in March 2022, the film received poor reviews from critics and was a box office bomb. In a review of the picture, David Rooney of The Hollywood Reporter wrote: "Arjona carries herself with confidence, but her character also gets a little lost in the carnage".

In 2020, she starred in the advertising campaign for Giorgio Armani's fragrance My Way. Later that year, Variety confirmed that Arjona had been cast in the Star Wars series Andor on Disney+. She joined series lead Diego Luna, who reprised his role from the 2016 film Rogue One: A Star Wars Story, with Arjona playing Bix Caleen.

In April 2021, Arjona was confirmed as the lead with Andy Garcia in the remake of Father of the Bride (1991), with the remake's story being told through the lens of a sprawling Cuban American family. In October 2021, Arjona starred in and produced the drama film Los Frikis, written and directed by Tyler Nilson and Michael Schwartz. Arjona then costarred with Glen Powell in the action comedy film Hit Man. She was involved in writing dialogue and storyboarding ideas for scenes. The film received praise from critics after its release in 2023, including regarding the acting. In 2024, she starred in Blink Twice, the directorial debut of Zoë Kravitz, and was subsequently cast in a lead role of the television series Criminal later that year. In 2025, Adria Arjona was praised for her acting in Splitsville at the 2025 Cannes Film Festival and also for Blink Twice and Andor.

In April 2026, it was announced that Arjona was cast in the 2027 DC Universe film Man of Tomorrow, in an undisclosed role.

== Personal life ==
Arjona married her longtime boyfriend, Puerto Rican lawyer Edgardo Canales in Guatemala on August 31, 2019. They separated in 2023. As of 2024, she is in a relationship with actor Jason Momoa.

== Filmography ==
Key
†	Denotes works that have not yet been released

=== Film ===
Year	Film	Role	Notes	Ref.
2012	Loss		Short film	
2015	Wedding in New York	Patricia		
2015	Eos	Woman	Short film	
2016	The Belko Experiment	Leandra Florez		
2016	Anomalous	Kate		
2018	Pacific Rim Uprising	Jules Reyes		
2018	Life of the Party	Amanda		
2019	Triple Frontier	Yovanna		
2019	6 Underground	Five / Amelia (The Doctor)		
2020	Guardians of Life	Surgeon	Short film	
2021	Sweet Girl	Amanda Cooper		
2022	Morbius	Martine Bancroft		
2022	Father of the Bride	Sofia Herrera		
2023	The Absence of Eden	Yadira		
2023	Hit Man	Madison Figueroa Masters		
2024	Los Frikis	Maria	Also executive producer	
2024	Blink Twice	Sarah		
2025	Splitsville	Ashley	Also executive producer	
2026	Onslaught	Celeste Cross	Also executive producer	
2027	The Thomas Crown Affair †	TBA	Post-production	
2027	Man of Tomorrow †	TBA	Post-production	
TBA	Scorn †	TBA	Post-production	
TBA	Copperhead †	TBA	Filming	

=== Television ===
Year	Title	Role	Notes
2014	Unforgettable	Suzy Houchen	Episode: "Cashing Out"
2014–2015	Person of Interest	Dani Silva	Episodes: "Point of Origin" and "M.I.A."
2015	Narcos	Helena	Episode: "The Sword of Simón Bolivar"
2015	True Detective	Emily	Recurring role; 6 episodes (season 2)
2017	Emerald City	Dorothy Gale	Main role; 10 episodes
2019	Good Omens	Anathema Device	Main role; 5 episodes (season 1)
2020	Monsterland	Mermaid	Episode: "Palacios, Texas"
2022	Irma Vep	Laurie	Miniseries
2022–2025	Andor	Bix Caleen	Main role; 17 episodes
2027	Criminal	Greta	Main role

=== Video games ===
Year	Title	Role	Notes	Ref.
2017	Fortnite	Ramirez, Wildcat	Voice	

== Awards and nominations ==
Award ceremony	Year	Category	Work	Result	Ref.
Astra Midseason Movie Awards	2024	Best Supporting Actress	Hit Man	2nd place	
Critics' Choice Super Awards	2025	Best Actress in a Science Fiction/Fantasy Series	Andor	Nominated	
Golden Raspberry Awards	2023	Worst Supporting Actress	Morbius	Won	
Imagen Awards	2017	Best Actress – Television	Emerald City	Nominated	
Imagen Awards	2025	Best Supporting Actress - Drama	Andor	Nominated	
Latino Entertainment Journalists Film Awards	2024	Best Actress	Los Frikis	Nominated	
Latino Entertainment Journalists Film Awards	2024	Breakout Award	Los Frikis	Won	
Online Film & Television Association	2023	Best Supporting Actress in a Drama Series	Andor	Nominated	
Peabody Award	2022	Entertainment	Andor	Won	
Peabody Award	2025	Entertainment	Andor	Won	
Premios Aura	2026	Hispanic presence in international series	Andor	Nominated	
Women in Film Honors	2026	MaxMara Face of the Future Award	Rising star	Honoured	
