= Borrowed =

- Theatrical Poster
- Directed by: Carlos Rafael Betancourt; Oscar Ernesto Ortega
- Written by: Oscar Ernesto Ortega; Carlos Rafael Betancourt; Jim Kirstead
- Produced by: Jim Kirstead; Willie Fernandez; Oscar Ernesto Ortega; Carlos Rafael Betancourt; Melissa Almaguer
- Starring: Jonathan Del Arco; Héctor Medina
- Cinematography: Oscar Ernesto Ortega
- Edited by: Carlos Rafael Betancourt
- Music by: Harold Lopez Nussa; Ruy Adrian Lopez Nussa
- Distributed by: Buffalo 8
- Release date: March 9, 2022 (Miami International Film Festival)
- Running time: 89 minutes
- Country: United States
- Languages: English; Spanish

Borrowed is a 2022 drama film directed by Carlos Rafael Betancourt and Oscar Ernesto Ortega. The film explores the relationship between two men living in South Florida. Borrowed stars Jonathan Del Arco and Héctor Medina, and had its world premiere at the 2022 Miami International Film Festival.

== Synopsis ==
The story centers around the relationship of David, a painter living an isolated life in the Florida Keys, with sophisticated and openly gay Justin, from Miami. What starts as a date and possibly posing for a painting unravels into a physiological struggle for power and freedom when David decides to “borrow” Justin against his will.

== Cast ==
- Jonathan Del Arco – David
- Hector Médina – Justin

== Release ==
The film premiered at the 2022 Miami International Film Festival. Borrowed received positive critical reception. It holds a 83% "Fresh" rating on Rotten Tomatoes based on six reviews.
