= Bee and PuppyCat =

American animated web series

- Season 1 logo
- Genre: Fantasy; Surrealism; Comedy-drama
- Created by: Natasha Allegri
- Written by: Natasha Allegri; Madeleine Flores; Frank Gibson
- Directed by: Larry Leichliter; Natasha Allegri (pilot)
- Voices of: Allyn Rachel; Oliver; Kent Osborne; Ashly Burch; Alexander James Rodriguez; Terri Hawkes; Tom Sandoval
- Composer: Will Wiesenfeld
- Country of origin: United States
- Original language: English
- No. of episodes: 10 + pilot

Production
- Executive producer: Fred Seibert
- Producers: Kevin Kolde; Eric Homan
- Animators: Dong Woo Animation (eps. 1–6); OLM Team Sakurai (eps. 7–10)
- Editor: Ray Valenzuela
- Running time: 6–11 minutes
- Production companies: Frederator Studios; Independent (pilot)

Original release
- Network: YouTube; Nintendo Video
- Release: July 11, 2013 – November 28, 2016

Bee and PuppyCat: Lazy in Space
- Genre: Fantasy; Surrealism; Comedy-drama
- Created by: Natasha Allegri
- Screenplay by: Efrain Farias; Hans Tseng; Jack Pendarvis; Etta Devine; Gabriel Diani; Pendleton Ward
- Story by: Natasha Allegri
- Directed by: Joji Shimura (chief)
- Voices of: Allyn Rachel; Oliver; Kent Osborne; Ashly Burch; Alexander James Rodriguez; Terri Hawkes; Tom Sandoval
- Composer: Will Wiesenfeld
- Countries of origin: Japan; United States
- Original languages: English; Japanese
- No. of seasons: 1
- No. of episodes: 16

Production
- Executive producers: Toshiaki Okuno; Junichi Yanagihara; Michael Hirsh; Fred Seibert; Natasha Allegri
- Producers: Kevin Kolde; Eric Homan
- Editor: Ray Valenzuela
- Running time: 22–25 minutes
- Production companies: OLM; Frederator Studios; Sprite Animation Studios

Original release
- Network: Netflix
- Release: September 6, 2022

Bee and PuppyCat is an American animated web series created and written by Natasha Allegri. The series revolves around Bee (voiced by Allyn Rachel), an unemployed slacker, who encounters a mysterious creature named PuppyCat (voiced by the Vocaloid program Oliver). She adopts this apparent cat-dog hybrid, and together they go on a series of temporary jobs to pay off her monthly rent. These bizarre jobs take the duo across strange worlds out in space. The original series was produced by Frederator Studios with the animation initially outsourced to South Korean studio Dong Woo Animation for episodes 1 to 6, and to Japanese studio OLM for episodes 7 to 10.

The series originated with a web pilot in 2013, followed by a Kickstarter-supported first season which was released on YouTube from 2014 to 2016.

A second series titled Bee and PuppyCat: Lazy in Space was produced and billed for a 2019 release on VRV, but it was delayed and leaked online in 2020.

Netflix later commissioned three additional episodes re-adapting the pilot and first season, and then packaged these along with the Lazy in Space episodes. The complete rebooted series was released on Netflix in 2022. KaBoom! Studios also published a comic book adaptation from 2014 to 2016.

On January 4, 2023, Genius Brands announced that they would sell a 50% stake in the series to Toho International, the US-based division of Japanese film studio Toho.

== Plot ==
Bee is a cheerful, eccentric slacker who is habitually fired from menial, low-paying jobs. On her way home from a failed job opportunity, PuppyCat, a strange, mysterious creature, falls from the sky. She takes him in and, when he sees that she is broke and unemployed, PuppyCat teleports himself and Bee to an alternate dimension where they are given a job by TempBot, a gigantic, intelligent television screen. Despite the dangers that this line of temporary jobs would pose, Bee finds that she has a talent for the work and that it pays well enough for her to disregard the dangers.

An ongoing plot element of the series is PuppyCat's past: he is revealed to be a space outlaw whose love for a space princess ended with him being cursed into his current state by a group of warlocks who constantly attempt to capture him wherever he goes. Other plot elements include Bee being revealed to be a robot, her relationship with the Wizard family and their youngest Deckard, a talented chef with a crush on her who eventually attends cooking school at her behest, and Bee's curiously young landlord Cardamon struggling with his work while caring for his comatose mother Violet. In the second-season finale, the island on which the story takes place is revealed to be Puppycat and Violet's spaceship, which is finally repaired as the group leaves Earth when the Warlocks attack their planet.

== Characters ==
=== Main ===
A screenshot from the first pilot episode of Bee and PuppyCat. PuppyCat is falling from the sky and is about to land on Bee.

- Bee (Voiced by: Allyn Rachel): Bee is a slacker who physically appears to be in her 20s and meets PuppyCat after being fired for sleeping on the job, becoming a temp worker who takes assignments from TempBot along with wardrobe changes for whatever planet she is assigned to. Bee has a strong dislike of water and also has known the Wizard family for years, with Cas noting her lack of aging; Bee is later revealed in "Donut" to be a robot created by her father. In the second-season finale, Bee is heavily damaged in saving Moully while sentient parts of her body use the wish crystal shards on Moully's person to become energy beings in Bee's likeness.
- PuppyCat (Voiced by: Oliver): The mysterious creature that is Bee's companion and roommate, named for his appearance and being an egocentric jerk. He does not speak and instead communicates with beeping sounds provided by the Vocaloid Oliver. He would later be revealed to be originally a candy hunter known as the Space Outlaw (Voiced by: Steve Blum as an adult; John Henry Fisher, young), who led a bounty hunting group called Team PuppyCat. But he ended up in his current form when he fell in love with a Space Princess who tricked him so the Warlocks can seal him away, only for their attempted sealing spell to unintentionally deform the Space Outlaw into PuppyCat.
- TempBot: Also referred to as AssignBot, is a series of robots that each act as a temporary employment agent for PuppyCat with a shared memory bank that allows them to identify their temp workers. In the pilot episode, TempBot is voiced by Marina Sirtis, Hannah Hart for "Farmer", Roz Ryan for "Cats", Ellen McLain for "Game", Joan Koplan for "Wedding", Leah Jungwirth for "Again for the First Time", Kathy Najimy for "Who Would Want This?", Terri Hawkes for "What Do You Want to Be?", "Little Fingers", and "Why Don't You Help Me", Suzanne Berhow for "Gentle Touch", Diana Garnet for "My Favorite", Maile Flanagan for "Did You Remember", Alison Cowles for "Bird Friend", Natasha Allegri for "Two Clown Noses", and Emilia Sheldon for "Golden Eyes".
- Deckard Wizard (Voiced by: Kent Osborne): Bee's friend, neighbor, and former coworker. Deckard works as a prep cook at the cat café from which Bee was fired. He harbors romantic feelings towards Bee. Deckard has a stutter and heterochromia. After the season one finale, Deckard leaves home in order to attend culinary school despite initial reluctance to leave Bee and home. He returns home in the second-season finale.
- Cas Wizard (Voiced by: Ashly Burch): Deckard's sister and roommate who was a former wrestler and worked at Howell's cat café before becoming a freelance computer programmer seen working in C# and Python. She is the only one of her family who takes note of Bee's inability to age and the strangeness that occurs around their home. Like her brothers, Cas is also named after a wizard; her full name is Castaspella, which is also the name of a character from the She-Ra franchise.
- Cardamon (Voiced by: Alexander James Rodriguez): Cardamon is a young boy who is Bee's landlord, business-like and mature for his age. He takes care of his comatose mother Violet, whom he regards as a "princess." He also has a dog named Sticky. The second series depicts his stress of being a landlord, having little to no adult supervision, being bullied in school, and finding ways of disposing of the blobs that have taken over his apartment. In the second-season finale, Violet places him back in stasis with her.
- Toast (Voiced by: Terri Hawkes): Toast is the 11th ranked wrestler from Cas' former wrestling team and holds a grudge against Cas' departure, as it leaves her to be the lowest-ranking member on the team. She intrudes into Cas' home life as a result and constantly picks fights with her, marrying Merlin and giving birth to their twin children.
- Crispin Wizard (Voiced by: Tom Sandoval): Cas and Deckard's third oldest brother who works in a garage as a mechanic. He has an interest in clowns since he ran away to the circus because his family accidentally forgot his 12th birthday. He incorporates clowns in his "art" which ranges from sculptures to cars. Crispin and Bee used to be in a relationship and lived together in Bee's apartment until he moved out. He still harbors some romantic feelings for Bee.

=== Recurring ===
- Howell Wizard (Voiced by: Kumail Nanjiani): Howell is the manager of the cat café and the middle child of the Wizard siblings.
- Wesley Wizard (Voiced by: Arin Hanson): The second oldest of Cas and Deckard's siblings who's an avid fisherman.
- Merlin Wizard (Voiced by: Doug Smith): The oldest of Cas and Deckard's siblings who accidentally gets Toast pregnant, becoming her "unwed" husband as a result. He is also a doctor.
- Tim Wizard (Voiced by: Freddie Wong): The fifth oldest of Cas and Deckard's siblings. He is quiet and has a journal of everyone's secrets.
- Bird (Voiced by: Shannon McCormick and Remy Edgerly (young)): Bee's scientist father who mysteriously disappeared.
- Warlocks (Voiced by: Natalie Wynn, Stephen Root, Eric Bauza, and Efrain Farias): The series antagonists who are tasked to hunt down Puppycat, placing their arms through a portal into space which turns them into enlarged limbs that fumble around for their quarry.
- Moully (Voiced by: Liam J. MacKay): A giant cat who befriends Bee, able to teleport to anyone's location if he possesses an item of theirs. A former maker of magical wish-granting donuts. Though he escapes the Warlocks' grip after they grabbed him during their attack on the Donut Planet, he ends up being controlled by them before Bee snaps him out of it at great cost to her body.
- Doublemouth (Voiced by: Donna Jay Fulks): A monster who used to be the Space Outlaw's strict teacher, serving as the first enemy Bee and PuppyCat encounter during their first temp job together.
- Pretty Patrick (Voiced by: Patrick Seery): The host of Bee and Puppycat's favorite show, who also happens to be the mayor of the island.
- Narb (Voiced by: Marc Mercado): A convenience store worker.

=== Guest ===
- Violet (Voiced by: Jennifer Tilly as an adult; Juliet Donenfeld, young): Cardamon's comatose mother who is revealed to be PuppyCat's partner when he was the Space Outlaw, the two being childhood friends. In the second series, after Cardamon gave his mom half of a wish donut in an attempt to revive her, Violet begins shedding tears with the wish-altering properties of a wish crystal that gradually fill up their apartment. Violet briefly reawakens in the second-season finale, revealing to actually be in stasis before returning to it with Cardamon until Bee's father has been found.
- Ms. Coffee (Voiced by: Cynthia McWilliams): Cardamon's Teacher.
- Mr. Assam (Voiced by: Stephen Root): Ms. Coffee's boyfriend.
- Boss: Moully's overbearing boss on the Donut Planet who lost his livelihood. He was voiced by Tommy Wiseau in "Donut", and Eric Bauza for "Golden Eyes" and the season 1 remake.
- Mister Cup (Voiced by: Jack Pendarvis)
- Ross (Voiced by: Ross Kolde)
- Sugar Cube (Voiced by: Cristina Fiumara)
- Claire (Voiced by: Cleary Herlinger)
- Dinosaur Kid (Voiced by: Alexander James Rodriguez)
- John Hammerbottom (Voiced by: Eric Bauza)
- Heart Head (Voiced by: Eric Bauza)
- Cathead (Voiced by: Jason Greene)
- Harlequin Turtlebottom (Voiced by: Natasha Allegri)
- Fish Girl (Voiced by: Emilia Sheldon)
- Cooking Prince (Voiced by: Robbie Daymond)
- Wiggly Worm #1 (Voiced by: Frank JavCee)
- Wiggly Worm #2 (Voiced by: Josh Clark)
- Fuzzy #1 (Voiced by: Bob Clendenin)
- Fuzzy #2 (Voiced by: Suzanne Berhow)
- Worker #1 (Voiced by: Machaizelli Cahey)
- Worker #2 (Voiced by: Kent Osborne)
- Worker #3 (Voiced by: Kent Osborne)
- Snail #1 (Voiced by: Alison Cowles)
- Snail #2 (Voiced by: Kent Osborne)
- Grasshopper (Voiced by: Doug Smith)
- Classmate #1 (Voiced by: Donna Jay Fulks)
- Classmate #2 (Voiced by: John Henry Fisher)
- Temp Worker (Voiced by: Tom Kenny)
- Wallace (Voiced by: Frank Gibson)
- Ladybug (Voiced by: Tom Kenny)
- Farmer (Voiced by: Stephen Root)
- Crab (Voiced by: Garrett Jackson)
- Cat #1 (Voiced by: Etta Devine)
- Cat #2 (Voiced by: Gabriel Diani)
- Elder Bird (Voiced by: Arin Hanson)
- Bird Citizen (Voiced by: Chad Quandt)
- Video Game Girl (Voiced by: Amarisse Sullivan)

== Production ==
=== Original series ===
Bee and PuppyCat originated as a two-part eleven minute pilot, which was uploaded to Frederator Studios' YouTube channel Cartoon Hangover as part of Too Cool! Cartoons, a project Frederator referred to as a "big idea cartoon incubator". Part one went online on July 11, 2013, while part two went online on August 6, 2013, followed by a video with both parts together on August 7, 2013. The shorts also aired on Nintendo Video on November 1, 2013, and had a rerun on January 14, 2014, while part two aired on January 20, 2014, as a supposed rerun. 4 episodes from season 1 also released on the platform.

After gaining popularity online, Cartoon Hangover started its first Kickstarter project to fund additional episodes. The Kickstarter started on October 15, 2013, and achieved its US$600,000 goal with six days left; by the end, it had raised $872,133, funding ten 6-minute episodes, the first of which would air in the summer of 2014. At that time, Bee and PuppyCat became the most successful animation Kickstarter in history, #4 in the film/video category (behind only three Hollywood-based projects), and the #1 Kickstarter based on a YouTube video. Bee and PuppyCat: The Series premiered November 6, 2014, with a second two-part episode. While a few episodes were released early to Kickstarter backers in 2015, the majority of the season was released through 2016, with production concluding in March that year. The second half of the season was planned for a YouTube release in late Spring/early Summer 2016 but were released November 11, 2016, on VRV instead. The complete first series was eventually uploaded in full to the Cartoon Hangover YouTube channel on December 1, 2018.

=== Lazy in Space ===
In March 2017, Frederator announced that new episodes of Bee and PuppyCat were being written, initially earmarked for release on VRV. VRV at the time included Cartoon Hangover. In June 2018, the trailer for the continuation was released under the title Bee and PuppyCat: Lazy in Space, which would have aired sometime in 2019. An episode was screened in September 2019 at the Ottawa International Animation Festival, but did not release on VRV as planned. By 2019 VRV was suffering from several departing channels, and parent AT&T was more focused on HBO Max than VRV. In 2020, the 13 then-produced episodes were leaked onto Fred Seibert's Vimeo channel. The episodes were later removed from the platform, but not before several streaming websites managed to obtain copies. Seibert stepped down from his position as CEO of Frederator in August, though the company indicated that he would remain executive producer for current projects, including Bee and PuppyCat.

In October 2020, it was announced that Netflix would be distributing the season in 2022. Described as a reboot, three new episodes were commissioned that retell the story of the original YouTube series, and these were presented along with the 13 episodes produced in 2019 as Lazy in Space. The episodes were renumbered accordingly. The series launched on September 6, 2022.

Bee and PuppyCat: Lazy in Space is a joint production between Frederator Studios and Japanese anime studio OLM. OLM's Los Angeles-based subsidiary Sprite Animation Studios also contributed to the project.

== Episodes ==
Series		Episodes	Original run		Original network
Series		Episodes	First	Last	Original network
1	Pilot	1 (2 parts)	July 11, 2013	August 6, 2013	Nintendo Video
1	Original series	10	November 6, 2014	November 28, 2016	YouTube / VRV
2	Lazy in Space	16	September 6, 2022		Netflix

=== Pilot (2013) ===
- The pilot was released via the Cartoon Hangover YouTube channel, and Nintendo Video in two parts.

No.	Title	Written, directed and storyboarded by	Original release date	Prod. code
0	"Pilot"	Natasha Allegri	July 11, 2013 August 6, 2013	TC106 TC107
Part 1: After getting fired from her job, Bee finds PuppyCat and takes him in. With no luck in finding a new job, PuppyCat offers Bee some temp work if they report to Fishbowl Space. The pair then disappear from Bee's apartment. Part 2: Bee and PuppyCat are assigned to babysit Wallace in Fishbowl Space. After PuppyCat sings him a lullaby about a cursed Space Outlaw, Wallace transforms into a monster. Bee and PuppyCat defeat him and return home.

=== Original series (2014–16) ===
- Note: The entire series (Note: On Kickstarter, it was billed as Bee and PuppyCat: The Series.) was directed by Larry Leichliter and written by Natasha Allegri, Madeleine Flores and Frank Gibson. In addition to separate YouTube video pages for individual episodes, the series was packaged into four videos of back-to-back episodes (titled "Food Farmer", "Beach Cats", "Birthday Game", and "Toast Dogs, Wedding Donut"), as well as one video containing the entire series.

No.	Title	Storyboards by	Original release date	Prod. code
1	"Food"	Natasha Allegri	November 6, 2014	BPC101
Bee invites Deckard to spend the day together and cook from a recipe. PuppyCat is infuriated at being called cute and sabotages their cooking, only to be interrupted by Cas. When Deckard admits that they are missing an ingredient, Bee and PuppyCat turn to TempBot to assign them a new job to afford them enough money to buy it.
2	"Farmer"	Natasha Allegri	November 6, 2014	BPC102
Bee and PuppyCat are assigned to retrieve a cherry for a farmer on Jelly Cube Planet for his animals. They discover that the cherry is created from souls from people fed to it. In horror, Bee spits her gum into the cherry and gives the rest to the farmer, leaving him and his animals to devour each other. Bee brings the missing ingredient home without being paid for the job, discovering in the process that Deckard has been accepted into culinary school.
3	"Beach"	Natasha Allegri	December 4, 2014	BPC103
Bee and PuppyCat are forced out of their apartment while their landlord, Cardamon, fixes their toilet. At the beach, the two try to find a television to watch Pretty Patrick Lunchtime and decide on going to TempBot to use her as a television screen.
4	"Cats"	Luke Weber and Natasha Allegri	December 18, 2014	BPC104
TempBot sends Bee and PuppyCat to Cat-Head Planet, an onsen filled with cats. While PuppyCat is shunned, Bee is favored by the cats and is doted upon. However, when the cats try to bathe Bee, PuppyCat rescues her by disgusting them with his appearance. They return home to find that Cardamon has taped and unknowingly spoiled the episode for them.
5	"Birthday"	Lamar Abrams and Natasha Allegri	August 27, 2015 (Kickstarter backers) November 11, 2016 (general release)	BPC105
Bee celebrates her birthday with her "Dad Box", a creation by her father to help her feel less lonely. PuppyCat offers to spend time with her, and she takes him to an abandoned arcade with games constructed by her father. After playing games, PuppyCat offers her to take a job from TempBot.
6	"Game"	Natasha Allegri, Marius Winter, and Efrain Farias	August 27, 2015 (Kickstarter backers) November 11, 2016 (general release)	BPC106
TempBot sends Bee and PuppyCat to Cloud World, where they are tasked with destroying an evil eye looming over the kingdom. Reluctant, Bee accepts side quests instead. After a while, PuppyCat uses an old save file to allow them enough experience and weaponry to defeat the evil eye. They return home and spend the rest of Bee's birthday together.
7	"Toast"	Vera Brosgol, Natasha Allegri, and Efrain Farias	November 28, 2016	BPC107
Deckard remains conflicted about attending culinary school, while Cas is challenged by Toast, a member from her former wrestling team.
8	"Dogs"	Vera Brosgol, Natasha Allegri, and Efrain Farias	November 28, 2016	BPC108
A sick Cardamon takes care of his comatose mother and recalls a fairytale from her about jellyfish. Once Bee and Deckard deliver their rent money, Cardamon asks for PuppyCat to spend time with him to stage a wedding with his dog, Sticky.
9	"Wedding"	Vera Brosgol, Natasha Allegri, and Efrain Farias	November 28, 2016	BPC109
Bee finds Deckard's school acceptance letter and feels guilty over him not enrolling. Meanwhile, PuppyCat is forced to play along with Cardamon's wedding, which Cardamon hopes will help wake his mother. While trying to escape, he becomes stuck in a window. Bee tries to free him by activating TempBot's letter, but she is transported along with Deckard instead. Note: "Wedding" was Joan Koplan's final acting role as she died on March 31, 2016 which was seven months before the episode was released on VRV.
10	"Donut"	Vera Brosgol, Natasha Allegri, and Efrain Farias	November 28, 2016	BPC110
TempBot assigns Bee and Deckard to help a doughboy bake donuts embedded with wish-granting baking crystals and deliver them through the Black Hole while his boss (Tommy Wiseau) is away. The Black Hole drags the doughboy in, revealing that Bee is a robot in the process. Bee rescues the bakery and Deckard, overcoming the Black Hole. Afterwards, Deckard leaves for culinary school. Cardamon feeds a wish-granting donut left by Bee to his mother but fails to awaken her. PuppyCat returns home to find Bee repairing her arm with her Dad Box. The two take their time to get to know each other better.

=== Lazy in Space (2022) ===
- Note: Episodes 4–16 were produced in 2019, while episodes 1–3 were produced in 2021 and did not include the moniker Lazy in Space.

No. overall	No. in season	Title	Episode Director	Written by	Storyboards by	Original release date	Prod. code
1	1	"Again for the First Time"	Jon Bennett	Efrain Farias & Hans Tseng	Natasha Allegri, Efrain Farias, Hans Tseng & Joji Shimura	September 6, 2022	BPC201
Remake of the original pilot and "Food".
2	2	"Who Would Want This?"	Jon Bennett	Efrain Farias & Hans Tseng	Natasha Allegri, Efrain Farias, Hans Tseng & Joji Shimura	September 6, 2022	BPC202
Bee and Puppycat do a bunch of jobs to pay their rent while Cardamon tends to the power outage in their house as well as their toilet. Incorporates elements of "Farmer", "Beach", "Cats", "Toast", and "Dogs"
3	3	"What Do You Want to Be?"	Jon Bennett	Efrain Farias & Hans Tseng	Natasha Allegri, Efrain Farias, Hans Tseng & Joji Shimura	September 6, 2022	BPC203
Incorporates elements of "Birthday", "Game", "Wedding", and "Donut"
4	4	"Gentle Touch"	Syuntaro Tozawa	Etta Devine & Gabriel Diani	Joji Shimura	September 6, 2022	BPC204
Bee and Puppycat visit Bee's old job at the Wizards' cat cafe and find the amount of bills the family is unable to pay ever since Deckard left for school. Bee attempts to help by eating as much on the menu she could order and by paying the family back with money earned from a temp job. While working, Bee is warned of strange magical hands causing issues on temp jobs.
5	5	"Little Fingers"	Hideaki Oba	Natasha Allegri & Pendleton Ward	Joji Shimura	September 6, 2022	BPC205
Bee and PuppyCat must take on a new temporary job after PuppyCat overspends on a mobile app game. It was first screened at the Ottawa International Animation Festival on September 25, 2019, and was released on YouTube on September 1, 2022.
6	6	"Day Off Work"	Takahiro Otsuka	Natasha Allegri	Joji Shimura	September 6, 2022	BPC206
Puppycat is annoyed with Bee after leaving him home alone to run errands. Meanwhile, the rest of the Wizard family annoys Cas on her day off.
7	7	"Snow and Violets"	Hideaki Oba	Jack Pendarvis	Joji Shimura	September 6, 2022	BPC207
After wrecking their bike in the woods, Bee and Puppycat take up a job helping an old racer beat his cheating younger self in a race. Meanwhile, Deckard is struggling in culinary school.
8	8	"Funny Lying"	Hideaki Oba	Efrain Farias, Hans Tseng & Pendleton Ward	Efrain Farias, Hans Tseng, Natasha Allegri & Kōyū	September 6, 2022	BPC208
Bee and Puppycat help Cardamom get rid of the tears by dumping them into the ocean. Puppycat accidentally goes underwater and dreams about his previous life.
9	9	"My Favorite"	Yūichirō Aoki	Natasha Allegri	Joji Shimura	September 6, 2022	BPC209
Pretty Patrick gets back from vacation with a baby and Puppycat wants to meet Patrick in person.
10	10	"Did You Remember"	Yoh Miura	Etta Devine & Gabriel Diani	Joji Shimura	September 6, 2022	BPC210
Puppycat surprises Bee on her birthday with tons of cakes all over the island.
11	11	"Bird Friend"	Yoshitaka Makino	Jack Pendarvis	Yoh Miura	September 6, 2022	BPC211
Bee tries to stop Puppycat from eating food off the floor.
12	12	"Two Clown Noses"	Hisaya Takabayashi	Jack Pendarvis	Joji Shimura	September 6, 2022	BPC212
Bee takes Crispin to see a clown planet on his birthday.
13	13	"Golden Eyes"	Yoh Miura	Etta Devine & Gabriel Diani	Yoh Miura	September 6, 2022	BPC213
While Howell is away, Wesley meets a rare fish with golden eyes.
14	14	"Why Don't You Help Me"	Kenichi Nishida	Etta Devine & Gabriel Diani	Yoh Miura	September 6, 2022	BPC214
Bee tries to clear overgrowing plants while Cardamon is on a school trip to the beach.
15	15	"Now I'm Really Alone"	Yoh Miura	Jack Pendarvis & Natasha Allegri	Joji Shimura	September 6, 2022	BPC215
Moully visits Bee while Puppycat must attend temp job retraining.
16	16	"I Won't Leave You Alone"	Joji Shimura	Natasha Allegri	Joji Shimura	September 6, 2022	BPC216
The island is attacked by magical hands while Puppycat tries to restart his ship.

== Reception ==
=== Original series ===
Critical reception for the original series has been mainly positive, though some fans have criticized the art and tone changes between the pilot and the Kickstarter-backed full series. In December 2014, critic Robert Lloyd of The L.A. Times listed it as one of the best TV shows of the year. The A.V. Club favorably rated the episode "Food Farmer", which they felt did a good job expanding Bee's character. The episode Little Fingers, then intended as the second episode of Lazy in Space, won best animated series at Ottawa International Animation Festival in 2019.

== In other media ==
- Characters from Bee and PuppyCat appeared on the cover for the second edition of Your Career in Animation: How to Survive and Thrive by David B. Levy.

=== Comics ===
Boom! Studios published a tie-in comic book through its KaBOOM! imprint. The comic was canceled after #11 in 2016 despite issues #12–#16 having already been solicited. Preview catalogues that year listed issues #12–#16, along with cover art and synopses.

Issue	Release date	Story	Art	Collection	ISBN
#1	May 14, 2014	Natasha Allegri; Garrett Jackson	Natasha Allegri	Bee and Puppycat – Volume One	978-1-60886-487-4
#2	June 11, 2014	Natasha Allegri; Frank Gibson; Garrett Jackson	Becky Dreistadt	Bee and Puppycat – Volume One	978-1-60886-487-4
#3	August 27, 2014	Natasha Allegri; Anissa Espinoza; Madeline Flores; Tait Howard; Ian McGinty	Anissa Espinoza; Madeline Flores; Tait Howard; Ian McGinty; Fred C. Stresing	Bee and Puppycat – Volume One	978-1-60886-487-4
#4	September 24, 2014	Natasha Allegri; Coleman Engle; Anissa Espinoza; Aimee Fleck; Pranas Naujokaitis; Mad Rupert; Theresa Zysk	Coleman Engle; Anissa Espinoza; Aimee Fleck; Pranas Naujokaitis; Mad Rupert; Theresa Zysk	Bee and Puppycat – Volume One	978-1-60886-487-4
#5	October 22, 2014	Chrystin Garland; Meredith McClaren; Flynn Nicholls; Theresa Zysk		Bee and Puppycat – Volume Two	978-1-60886-776-9
#6	November 26, 2014	Natasha Allegri; Joy Ang; Andrew Lorenzi; Meredith McClaren; Carey Pietsch	Joy Ang; Andrew Lorenzi; Meredith McClaren; Carey Pietsch	Bee and Puppycat – Volume Two	978-1-60886-776-9
#7	December 24, 2014	Natasha Allegri; Megan Brennan; Andrew Lorenzi; Zachary Sterling	Megan Brennan; Andrew Lorenzi; Zachary Sterling	Bee and Puppycat – Volume Two	978-1-60886-776-9
#8	April 8, 2015	David Calderon; Coleman Engle; Liz Fleming; Reimena Yee; Theresa Zysk	Natasha Allegri; David Calderon; Coleman Engle; Liz Fleming; Reimena Yee; Theresa Zysk	Bee and Puppycat – Volume Two	978-1-60886-776-9
#9	August 26, 2015	Natasha Allegri; Patrick Seery	Ji In Kim	Bee and Puppycat – Volume Three	978-1-60886-911-4
#10	February 17, 2016	Natasha Allegri; Patrick Seery; Ko Takeuchi	Ji In Kim; Ko Takeuchi	Bee and Puppycat – Volume Three	978-1-60886-911-4
#11	April 20, 2016	Natasha Allegri; Patrick Seery	Ji In Kim	Bee and Puppycat – Volume Three	978-1-60886-911-4
