= Juliet Lyons =

American singer

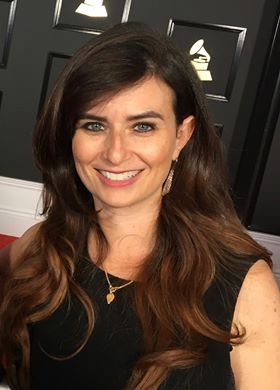
- Juliet Lyons on Red Carpet at the 2019 Grammy Awards

Background information
- Born: Juliet Lyons
- Genres: Pop, New Age, Trance
- Occupations: Singer; songwriter; composer
- Instruments: Vocals, Piano
- Years active: 2008 - Present
- Website: www.julietlyons.com

Juliet Lyons is an American singer, songwriter, and production music composer. Her album, The Light Within: Songs For Yoga, Healing, & Inner Peace, charted at #3 on Billboard's New Age album charts and she's won two HMMA Awards and a Peace Award. She is perhaps best known as the featured vocalist in the Cinderella trailer and for her cover of Billy Idol’s “White Wedding,” in the ABC Family television show Pretty Little Liars.

== Early life ==
Juliet Lyons was born in Stanford, CA and grew up in Albuquerque, NM. She graduated from UMKC Conservatory of Music and earned a Bachelor in Music - Vocal Performance and a Bachelor in Music Education.

== Career ==
Lyons has written, produced, and performed music which has been licensed in over 150 studio films, network television series, and trailers. Her music ranges from Pop to New Age. Notable productions include the films Cinderella, Ghost In the Shell and television shows Pretty Little Liars and The Voice. Her 2019 record release, The Light Within: Songs for Yoga, Healing, & Inner Peace debuted at number 3 on the Billboard New Age albums Chart.

== Music awards and nominations ==
Lyons has been nominated twice for the Independent Music Awards, and eleven times for Hollywood Music in Media Awards. She has won two Hollywood Music in Media Awards (HMMA).
