= Alexander James Rodriguez =

British actor

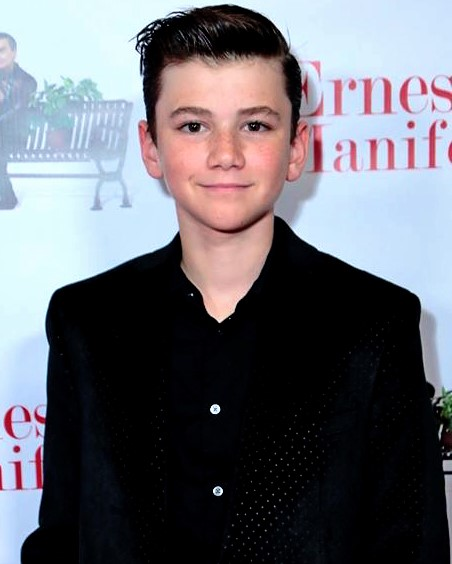
- Born: Marbella, Spain
- Occupations: Actor; singer
- Years active: 2013–present
- Website: iamajrodriguez.com

Alexander James Rodriguez (also known as AJ Rodriguez) is a Spanish-born British actor and singer best known for his voice acting in a variety animated productions including the 2020 Golden-Globe winner and Academy Awards-nominee Missing Link, and for being the voice of Cardamon on the Netflix show Bee and PuppyCat.

== Life and career ==
Rodriguez was born in Marbella, Spain and raised in the United Kingdom. In 2014 Rodriguez joined SAG-AFTRA.

In 2015, Rodriguez joined the cast of Appropriate at the Mark Taper Forum in Los Angeles.

The actor progressed into music in May 2020, when he recorded pop records, including the title "My Crew" released during the COVID 19 pandemic lockdown.

In September 2020, Rodriguez was cast in the film Where Sweet Dreams Die; and was attached to the TV documentary series, Content is King.

Alexander James Rodriguez received the Rising Star Award (Male) in January 2021 at the 11th Annual Hollywood Music in Media Awards for his song, "My Crew", and in May, he released his summer anthem, "California". He released his first Spanish-English hybrid song "Bella Loquita" in July 2021. Since then, Alexander has gone on to release multiple pop records in both English and Spanish.

== Filmography ==
=== Film ===
Year	Title	Role	Notes
2016	Alice Through The Looking Glass	Townsboy	British Voice
2018	Flock of Four	Young Joey	
2019	Missing Link	Old Worlder	British Voice
2024	Loves Second Act	Young Nick	

=== Television ===
Year	Title	Role	Notes
2013–present	Bee and PuppyCat	Cardamon	British Voice

== Discography ==
Release date	Singles and Album(s)	Artist(s)	Writer(s)
July 7, 2020	My Crew	Alexander James Rodriguez	Alex Jacke & Liz Rodriguez
August 8, 2020	Your Smile	Alexander James Rodriguez	Alex Jacke, Tiana Kocher & Liz Rodriguez
September 9, 2020	Up to You	Alexander James Rodriguez	Alex Jacke & Liz Rodriguez
November 6, 2020	Holiday in L.A	Alexander James Rodriguez	Cover Song
February 26, 2021	Doesn't Matter To Me	Alexander James Rodriguez	Alexander James Rodriguez, Liz Rodriguez & Alex Jacke
April 2, 2021	We Are	Alexander James Rodriguez	Alexander James Rodriguez, Liz Rodriguez & Alex Jacke
May 7, 2021	California	Alexander James Rodriguez	Alexander James Rodriguez, Liz Rodriguez & Alex Jacke
July 9, 2021	Bella Loquita	Alexander James Rodriguez	Alexander James Rodriguez & Liz Rodriguez.
August 20, 2021	Freedom	Alexander James Rodriguez	Wham!
October 1, 2021	Cherry Bomb	Alexander James Rodriguez	Alexander James Rodriguez, Liz Rodriguez & Alex Jacke.
November 19, 2021	We Need A Little Christmas	Alexander James Rodriguez	Jerry Herman & Alexander James Rodriguez
January 14, 2022	Alright	Alexander James Rodriguez	Alexander James Rodriguez & Liz Rodriguez
March 18, 2022	Shine	Alexander James Rodriguez	Alexander James Rodriguez & Liz Rodriguez
May 25, 2022	Mesmerized	Alexander James Rodriguez	Alexander James Rodriguez & Liz Rodriguez
July 7, 2022	Verano Para Siempre	Alexander James Rodriguez	Alih Jey, Alexander James Rodriguez & Liz Rodriguez
September 2, 2022	Mister Fahrenheit	Alexander James Rodriguez	Alexander James Rodriguez & Liz Rodriguez
November 1, 2022	Circles In My Mind	Alexander James Rodriguez	Alexander James Rodriguez & Liz Rodriguez
February 3, 2023	Euphoria	Alexander James Rodriguez	Bud'da, Alexander James Rodriguez & Liz Rodriguez
May 19, 2023	Hold On Me	Alexander James Rodriguez	Alexander James Rodriguez, Tyler Conti & Liz Rodriguez
January 24, 2024	Ride Or Die	Alexander James Rodriguez	Alexander James Rodriguez & Liz Rodriguez
February 29, 2024	Call Me Alexander: What Is Love - Mister Fahrenheit (Kryptonite) - Ride Or Die - Moth Into A Flame - Euphoria (My Love) - Mesmerized (In Your Eyes) - Call Me Alexander (Interlude) - Flashback - Hold On Me (Deluxe) - Changes	Alexander James Rodriguez	Haddaway, Bud'da, Tyler Conti Alexander James Rodriguez & Liz Rodriguez
November 22, 2024	One More Try	Alexander James Rodriguez	George Michael
March 7, 2025	Cada Minuto	Alexander James Rodriguez	Alih Jay, Alexander James Rodriguez & Liz Rodriguez
May 30, 2025	Noche Sin Fin	Alexander James Rodriguez	Alexander James Rodriguez & Liz Rodriguez
June 27, 2025	One Night Only	Alexander James Rodriguez	Alexander James Rodriguez & Liz Rodriguez
October 21, 2025	Notorious	Alexander James Rodriguez	Duran Duran
May 22, 2026	Veneno	Alexander James Rodriguez	David Stewart Jr., Alexander James Rodriguez & Liz Rodriguez
