= Los Frikis (film) =

American historical drama film

- Theatrical release poster
- Directed by: Tyler Nilson; Michael Schwartz
- Written by: Tyler Nilson; Michael Schwartz
- Produced by: Phil Lord; Christopher Miller; Michael Schwartz; Tyler Nilson
- Starring: Héctor Medina; Eros de la Puente; Adria Arjona
- Cinematography: Santiago Gonzalez
- Edited by: Jon Otazua
- Music by: Steven Price
- Production companies: Lord Miller Productions; New Slate Ventures
- Distributed by: Wayward/Range
- Release dates: April 6, 2024 (Miami); December 25, 2024 (United States)
- Running time: 105 minutes
- Country: United States
- Language: Spanish
- Box office: $164,748

Los Frikis is a 2024 American drama film based on true events, set in Cuba in the 1990s. It is written and directed by Tyler Nilson and Michael Schwartz, who also wrote and directed The Peanut Butter Falcon. It stars Héctor Medina, Eros de la Puente and Adria Arjona, and is produced by Phil Lord and Christopher Miller. The film received positive reviews from critics and grossed $164,748.

== Premise ==
Living in Cuba during the Special Period, the young members of a punk rock band seeking musical freedom, relief from poverty, and a sense of independence, purposely infect themselves with HIV. This allows them refuge at an isolated government-run sanatorium where they live life on their own terms, forging a seemingly utopian community and looking to an uncertain future with hope and resilience.

== Cast ==
- Adria Arjona as Maria
- Héctor Medina as Paco
- Eros de la Puente as Gustavo
- Manuel Alejandro Rodríguez Gomez
- Pedro Martínez
- Euriamis Losada
- Jorge Enrique Caballero

== Production ==
The film is written and directed by Tyler Nilson and Michael Schwartz, who previously directed The Peanut Butter Falcon (2019). New Slate financed the film, with Schwartz and Nilson as producers alongside Phil Lord and Christopher Miller, as well as Rebecca Tomlinson for Lord Miller. Adria Arjona is an executive producer and a member of the cast as sanatorium caregiver, Maria, alongside Héctor Medina and Eros de la Puente as brothers Paco and Gustavo.

Beyond Puerto Rican-born Adria Arjona, the cast was made up entirely of native Cubans, in order to facilitate authenticity. Writer/director Schwartz learned to become an effective Spanish speaker to aid and authenticate script development as well as communication with the cast and crew. The filmmakers encouraged actors to give feedback and improvise to facilitate accuracy in the film's depiction of Cuban culture. The production used historical objects and materials instead of replicas where possible and constructed period accurate sets.

Principal photography took place in the Dominican Republic. The work of Los Frikis cinematographer Santiago Gonzalez has been recognized by IndieWire as "some of the best of 2024".

Film editing was done by Jon Otazua, who received the 2024 Woodstock Film Festival's Best Narrative Editing Award for his work on Los Frikis.

The soundtrack by Steven Price includes musical artists who influenced the real-world Los Frikis, the Cuban punk subculture for which the movie is named, including The Rolling Stones and Nirvana.

== Release ==
Los Frikis had its world premiere at the Miami International Film Festival in April 2024, where it received a standing ovation and was awarded the Marimbas award. In October 2024, Wayward/Range acquired distribution rights to the film and set it for a December 25, 2024, release. Los Frikis opened in select theaters in New York City and Los Angeles on December 20, 2024, and expanded in limited release on Christmas Day, December 25, 2024. Los Frikis released for rent or download on multiple digital platforms on March 28, 2025.

== Reception ==
=== Critical response ===
On the review aggregator website Rotten Tomatoes, 85% of 17 critics' reviews are positive, with an average rating of 7.2/10.

Los Frikis was praised for its compassion and authenticity, with reviewers commenting that it evoked a range of emotions, from joy to sorrow, and characterized the film as a tribute to friendship, love, community, freedom, and resilience.

=== Accolades ===
Los Frikis won multiple festival jury and audience awards, including Best Narrative Feature and/or audience awards at the 2024 Nantucket Film Festival, the 2024 San Antonio Film Festival, the 2024 Sidewalk Film Festival, the 2024 Middlebury New Filmmakers Film Festival, the 2024 Crested Butte Film Festival, the 2024 Tallgrass Film Festival, the 2024 SCAD Savannah Film Festival and the 2024 Evolution Mallorca International Film Festival as well as a 2024 Shine Global Resilience Award and the Heartland International Film Festival's 2024 Richard D. Propes Narrative Social Impact Award as well as the 2024 Heartland Film Truly Moving Picture Award. Héctor Medina (as Paco) was recognized with a Best Performance Award at the 2024 San Antonio Film Festival. Editor Jon Otazua was recognized by the 2024 Woodstock Film Festival for his work on Los Frikis. Los Frikis was recognized by the Latino Entertainment Journalists 2024 film Awards with six nominations in acting, screenplay, film and other categories. Adria Arjona won the related actor Breakout Award. Additional accolades include Best Picture at the 2025 Cine International Film Festival in London and the JuryAward at the 2025 CIFF & Lavazza Inclucivity International film festival in Toronto. Eros de la Puente received this festival's Best Actor award for his "raw transformative performance" as Gustavo.
