= The Forty-Year-Old Version =

2020 film by Radha Blank

- Official poster
- Directed by: Radha Blank
- Written by: Radha Blank
- Produced by: Lena Waithe; Jordan Fudge; Radha Blank; Inuka Bacote-Capiga; Jennifer Semler; Rishi Rajani
- Starring: Radha Blank; Peter Kim; Oswin Benjamin; Reed Birney
- Cinematography: Eric Branco
- Edited by: Robert Grigsby Wilson
- Music by: Guy C. Routte
- Production companies: New Slate Ventures; Hillman Grad Productions; Endeavor Content
- Distributed by: Netflix
- Release dates: January 25, 2020 (Sundance); October 9, 2020 (United States)
- Running time: 129 minutes
- Country: United States
- Language: English

The Forty-Year-Old Version is a 2020 American comedy-drama film written, directed, and produced by Radha Blank, in her feature directorial debut. It stars Blank, Peter Kim, Oswin Benjamin, and Reed Birney.

Loosely based on Blank's own life, the film sees her playing Radha, a playwright and teacher who turns to rapping when she finds herself nearing her 40th birthday.

It had its world premiere at the Sundance Film Festival on January 25, 2020, where Blank won the U.S Dramatic Competition Directing Award, and was released on October 9, 2020, by Netflix. It was named one of the ten best films of 2020 by the National Board of Review.

== Plot ==
Radha is a playwright and teacher nearing her 40th birthday and living under the burden of the unfulfilled promise of a 30 under 30 award she won nearly a decade ago. Archie, her agent and friend, gives her latest play Harlem Ave to J. Whitman, a wealthy white producer, who suggests her work needs to focus more on Black suffering. After he offers her a job writing for a Harriet Tubman musical, Radha throttles him.

At a loss over what to do with her career, Radha hears rap music blasting outside her apartment and is inspired to start writing raps, following a passion she developed and abandoned in high school. Tracking down D, a music producer, she invents the name RadhaMUSprime. Archie believes she is going through a breakdown.

D is initially distant towards Radha, but after they create a track together, she is shocked to find him willing to record a mixtape with her. He also invites her to perform at a showcase for up-and-coming rappers. Before the showcase Radha gets high and forgets her lyrics, leading her to humiliate herself in front of a crowd of her students.

Archie uses the recent death of Radha's mother to smooth things over with Whitman, who agrees to produce Harlem Ave. However, he tells her to add a white character to her play. As the play progresses to the workshop stage, Radha increasingly feels uncomfortable with the compromises she is making to appeal to white audiences.

Despite witnessing her bombing on stage, D encourages Radha to continue rapping. After taking her to an all-woman rap battle in the Bronx, they spend the night together and open up about their lives as struggling artists and the way they are coping with the recent loss of their mothers. However, Radha brushes D off the next morning, telling him she needs to work on her play.

Radha continues to struggle with the compromises she makes to have the play produced. Cleaning out her mother's apartment with her brother, she reflects on her mother's career as a struggling artist. Radha is surprised and encouraged to see that her brother views their mother as a talented Renaissance woman rather than a failure.

On her play's opening night, Radha appears during the curtain call and denounces her work, rapping about the need for an artist to stay true to their artistic vision. She fires Archie at the same time he quits and then heads to D's apartment to reunite with him. The film ends with the two walking together, him beatboxing and her rapping, as the shot slowly changes from black and white to color.

== Cast ==
- Radha Blank as Radha
- Peter Kim as Archie
- Oswin Benjamin as D
- Imani Lewis as Elaine
- Haskiri Velazquez as Rosa
- Antonio Ortiz as Waldo
- TJ Atoms as Kamal
- Jacob Ming-Trent as Lamont
- Stacey Sargeant as Stacey
- William Oliver Watkins as Marcus
- Meghan O'Neill as Jaime
- André Ward as Forrest
- Welker White as Julie
- Reed Birney as J. Whitman

== Production ==
In August 2019, it was announced Radha Blank, Peter Kim, and Oswin Benjamin had joined the cast of the film, with Blank directing from a screenplay she wrote and Lena Waithe producing. The title is a play on the 2005 comedy The 40-Year-Old Virgin.

== Release ==
It had its world premiere at the Sundance Film Festival on January 25, 2020. Shortly after, Netflix acquired distribution rights to the film. It was released on October 9, 2020.

== Reception ==
=== Critical response ===
On Rotten Tomatoes, the film holds an approval rating of 99% based on 134 reviews, with an average rating of 8.10/10. The website's critics consensus reads "The Forty-Year-Old Version opens a compelling window into the ebbs and flows of the artist's life—and announces writer-director-star Radha Blank as a major filmmaking talent with her feature debut." Metacritic assigned the film a weighted average score of 80 out of 100, based on 28 critics, indicating "generally favorable" reviews.

=== Accolades ===
| Award | Date of ceremony | Category | Recipient(s) | Result | Ref. |
|---|---|---|---|---|---|
| Sundance Film Festival | February 1, 2020 | U.S. Dramatic Competition Directing Award | Radha Blank | Won | |
| Sundance Film Festival | February 1, 2020 | U.S. Dramatic Competition Grand Jury Prize | Radha Blank | Nominated | |
| Hollywood Music in Media Awards | January 27, 2021 | Best Original Song in a Feature Film | "Poverty Porn" – Radha Blank and Christopher Tyson | Nominated | |
| Hollywood Music in Media Awards | January 27, 2021 | Best Music Supervision – Film | Guy C. Routte | Nominated | |
| Satellite Awards | February 15, 2021 | Best Motion Picture – Comedy or Musical | The Forty-Year-Old Version | Won | |
| Austin Film Critics Association | March 19, 2021 | Best First Film | The Forty-Year-Old Version | Nominated | |
| Austin Film Critics Association | March 19, 2021 | The Robert R. "Bobby" McCurdy Memorial Breakthrough Artist Award | Radha Blank | Won | |
| NAACP Image Awards | March 22–25, 2021 | Outstanding Directing in a Motion Picture | Radha Blank | Nominated | |
| NAACP Image Awards | March 22–25, 2021 | Outstanding Breakthrough Creative (Motion Picture) | Radha Blank | Nominated | |
| NAACP Image Awards | March 22–25, 2021 | Outstanding Writing in a Motion Picture | Radha Blank | Won | |
| Directors Guild of America Awards | April 10, 2021 | Outstanding Directing – First-Time Feature Film | Radha Blank | Nominated | |
| British Academy Film Awards | April 11, 2021 | Best Actress in a Leading Role | Radha Blank | Nominated | |
| Casting Society of America | April 15, 2021 | Studio or Independent – Comedy | Jessica Daniels | Won | |
| Motion Picture Sound Editors Awards | April 16, 2021 | Outstanding Achievement in Sound Editing – Musical for Feature Film | Lightchild | Nominated | |
| Independent Spirit Awards | April 22, 2021 | Best First Feature | The Forty-Year-Old Version | Nominated | |
