= Alex Rodriguez (Andorran footballer) =

Andorran footballer

Personal information
- Date of birth: 15 October 1980 (age 46)
- Place of birth: Andorra
- Position: Left back

International career
Years	Team	Apps	(Gls)
2004	Andorra	1	(0)

Alex Rodriguez (born 15 October 1980) is an Andorran football player. He has played for Andorra national team and Santa Coloma.

== National team statistics ==
Updated 28 September 2014

Andorra national team
Year	Apps	Goals
2004	1	0
Total	1	0
