= Los Frikis =

Cuban punk subculture

Los Frikis or the Frikis is a Cuban punk subculture that originated in the 1980s. As Cuban radio stations rarely played rock music, Frikis often listened to music by picking up radio frequencies from stations in nearby Florida. Many Frikis in the early 1990s entered AIDS clinics by knowingly injecting HIV-positive blood into themselves in order to have enough to eat and a safe place to sleep and live. Others began congregating at a community centre in Havana called El patio de María which was one of the few venues in the city that allowed rock bands to play live music. It was shut down by the Cuban government in 2003 because too many Frikis (with ties to El Patio de María) sang too many songs with lyrics against the Castro regime.

Some Frikis also participate or participated in squatting as an act of political defiance, especially since affordable housing was and is a problem in many places in Cuba.

In a 2017 article for Time Out, journalist Jake Newby described the movement as in decline, due to "only a handful of Los Frikis remain[ing]."

== Etymology ==
The name "Frikis" is a Spanish take on the English word "freaky," meaning "causing fright." In an article for Public Radio International, Frikis were defined as "the most extreme members of the rock scene." In Conflict and Change in Cuba by Enrique A. Baloyra and James A. Morris, the term was defined as referring to youths who practice anti-social behaviour, have dropped out of mainstream education, refuse to conform to the norms of Cuban society, wear black, have long hair, and listen to rock music." In Teen Lives around the World: A Global Encyclopedia, author Karen Wells described Frikis as a group who listen to hardcore punk that is synonymous with the modern punk subculture. Author Julia Cooke described the group as a subculture of anarcho-punks that are fans of rock and heavy metal.

In an article for the Havana Times, writer Dmitri Prieto claimed that the term was first used in the 1970s in reference to those who attended folk music performances, equating this term to "hippies." Similarly, both TheJournal.ie and NDTV referred to the modern group as "hippie-punk."

== Fashion ==
The fashion of the Frikis subculture is based around extreme hair styles, clothing, and body modification, such as mohawks, tattoos, piercings, stretched ears, and long hair. Clothing often features skulls, rips, and rock band logos. The Other Side of Paradise: Life in the New Cuba author Julia Cooke described a particular group of Frikis that she met as wearing a "mid-nineties punk-grunge hodgepodge; torn jeans, wallet chains, boots, scruffy Converse shoes, ink limbs. Each sculpted his hair into a Mohawk."

== Response ==
In its beginning, the subculture was seen as a threat to the collectivism of Cuban society, leading to Frikis becoming victims of discrimination and police brutality. According to the New Times Broward-Palm Beach, some Frikis were "rejected by family and often jailed or fined by the government." However, the 1980s Friki woman Yoandra Cardoso has argued that much of the response was verbal harassment from law enforcement. Dionisio Arce, lead vocalist of Cuban heavy metal band Zeus, spent six years in prison due to his part in the Frikis. Some schools would forcibly shave the heads of young Frikis as a form of punishment.

== AIDS epidemic ==
During the Special Period in the 1990s, many Frikis purposely contracted AIDS in an attempt to escape the effects of the economic crisis by entering state-run AIDS clinics, referred to as sanatoriums. One of the first to do so was Papo la Bala, who injected himself with the infected blood of an HIV-positive rocker and converted to Christianity on his deathbed. According to Nolan Moore, a writer for ListVerse, "hundreds of teens" followed in la Bala's example. Although no official statistics exist of the numbers of infected Frikis, the University of Pennsylvania have stated that "many estimate that approximately 200 people–mostly men–had infected themselves" and that "not realizing it spread through sexual contact, many of their girlfriends also suffered from the consequences of their actions." In a 2017 documentary by Vice Media, Friki Yoandra Cardoso said, "When the sanatorium first opened, it was 100% Frikis."

The government responded to this movement by reducing the number of shops where syringes could be bought in an attempt to reduce injection of contaminated blood. Within two years of the beginning of the movement, eighteen Frikis had died as a result.

While in the clinics, some doctors allowed patients to listen to bands such as Nirvana and AC/DC, and many Frikis formed punk rock bands using "speakers made from cardboard, electric guitars from East Berlin with strings made from telephone wires, and drum kits made from the materials found in x-rays." In particular, one band that formed out of a clinic was Eskoria, who in an article by Public Radio International were described as "the founding fathers of Cuban punk".

These events led to the founding of Rock vs AIDS, a campaign started by Maria Gattorno that promoted safe sex by handing out information leaflets and condoms to Frikis. It also led to a larger social and governmental acceptance of Frikis and rock music in general.
