= Radha Blank =

American filmmaker and actress

- Born: September 24, 1976 (age 49); New York City, U.S.
- Occupations: Actress, filmmaker, playwright, rapper, comedian
- Notable work: The Forty-Year-Old Version
- Father: Roger Blank

Radha Blank (born September 24, 1976) is an American actress, filmmaker, playwright, rapper, and comedian. Born and raised in New York City, Blank is known for writing, directing, producing, and starring in The Forty-Year-Old Version (2020), for which she won the U.S. Dramatic Competition Directing Award at the Sundance Film Festival making Radha, after Ava DuVernay, only the second Black woman director in Sundance’s 40 year history to win the award.

== Career ==
=== Early work ===
Blank began her career as a playwright, writing several plays that never made it to the stage; in an interview with The Guardian, Blank claimed to have "about 12 plays that haven't seen the light of day." Her plays include HappyFlowerNail, Casket Sharp, nannyland and the critically acclaimed Seed. She is a Helen Merrill Playwriting Award recipient, an NEA New Play Development Award recipient and a NYFA Fellow. Though under-produced, Blank’s plays helped her secure writing jobs in television. Seed did make it to Off Broadway and received critical acclaim. Seed opened in Harlem in 2011 and followed a social worker who upon approaching retirement becomes obsessed with the welfare of a child genius from the projects. Seed was a 2010 recipient of the National Endowment of the Arts New Play Development Award. The Huffington Post called Seed "fresh, lively...and poetic." Early in her career, while working as a playwright, Blank wrote for the children's shows The Backyardigans and Little Bill as well as the popular children's shorts "Maya the Indian Princess" and “My Papa Is A Moco Jumbie” for Nickelodeon and Nick Jr.

In 2015, Blank wrote (along with Selema Masekela) and directed the comedic short Sam Bowe: Speech Writer which was featured on FunnyOrDie.com.

Around this time she invented her alter ego, rapper RadhaMUSprime and first performed a live show called The Forty-Year Old Version: A Mixtape where she used beats, rhymes and film to both channel the grief of losing her mother and her fears of approaching 40. She invented the persona after she was fired from a screenwriting job several years ago. In an interview with Indiewire, she states that "I've been rhyming since I was about 10 years old." She also states that "I do feel like hip-hop as an art form, you kind of have permission to brag, to live in a place of bravado and just kind of speak the truth in ways that we wouldn't ordinarily do." She has also found work in the writer's rooms of the television series Empire and Spike Lee's series She's Gotta Have It.

=== Breakthrough with The Forty-Year-Old Version ===
Before producing The Forty-Year-Old Version, Blank landed representation from the agency WME.

Blank achieved widespread acclaim for writing, directing, producing, and starring in The Forty-Year-Old Version (2020). For her work on the film, Blank won the U.S. Dramatic Competition Directing Award at the 2020 Sundance Film Festival. Following its premiere at Sundance, the film was acquired by Netflix for distribution. The film is loosely based on Blank's experiences as a struggling playwright in New York. The title is intended to have complex implications about popular storytelling, specifically the assimilation of Black stories. Blank shot the film on 35-millimeter black-and-white film stock. The film's autobiographical nature is highlighted by the filming in Blank's own apartment and the inclusion of her brother Ravi in the film. The film was released on Netflix on October 9, 2020, and received positive reviews from film critics.

Later that year, Blank received the 2020 Vanguard Award from the Sundance Institute, which "honors the artistic achievement of her feature film directorial debut." For her work on The Forty-Year-Old Version, Blank received nominations from the Gotham Independent Film Awards, for the Bingham Ray Breakthrough Director Award and for Best Screenplay, winning the latter. Variety named her one of "10 Directors to Watch in 2020". When talking about this film to Indiewire, she states “There was a time when storytellers took more risks, so I’m hoping that this film sets the tone for the kind of career I want to have, where people are not expecting me to be safe.”

For her performance in the film, Blank was nominated for the BAFTA Award for Best Actress in a Leading Role.

Blank received the AAFCA award for Breakout Performance for her work The Forty-Year-Old Version in 2021. Blank also won the NAACP Image Award for Outstanding Writing in a Motion Picture in 2021. The director also won the New York Film Critics Circle Award for Best First Film in 2020.

== Personal life ==
Her father Roger Blank is a renowned jazz drummer. Her mother, Carol Blank, with whom she shares a birthday, was a celebrated artist, teacher, and curator who died on October 7, 2013, and is referenced in The Forty-Year-Old Version. Blank's brother Ravi is featured in The Forty-Year-Old Version as himself.
