= The 24th =

2020 American historical drama film

- Official poster
- Directed by: Kevin Willmott
- Written by: Kevin Willmott; Trai Byers
- Produced by: Jordan Fudge; Alexandra Milchan; Kevin Willmott; Trai Byers
- Starring: Trai Byers; Bashir Salahuddin; Aja Naomi King; Mo McRae; Tosin Morohunfola; Mykelti Williamson; Thomas Haden Church
- Cinematography: Brett Pawlak
- Edited by: Mollie Goldstein
- Music by: Alex Heffes
- Production company: New Slate Ventures
- Distributed by: Vertical Entertainment
- Release date: August 21, 2020
- Running time: 113 minutes
- Country: United States
- Language: English

The 24th is a 2020 American historical drama film co-written and directed by Kevin Willmott. The film stars Trai Byers, Bashir Salahuddin, Aja Naomi King, Mo McRae, Tosin Morohunfola, Mykelti Williamson, and Thomas Haden Church. It generally tells a story of the Houston riot of 1917.

== Plot ==
The 24th is based on the true story of the Houston riot of 1917. The film features an African American (A.K.A. Buffalo Soldiers) military unit, the 24th Infantry Regiment in Houston, Texas. Despite their military service, the African American soldiers are subjected to racial discrimination by the all-white police force in Houston as well as from the local white people in Houston. The constant racial discrimination leads to a riot and seizure of military weapons by the African American military unit against the local population, resulting in the deaths of 11 civilians and 5 policemen. The riot and resulting violence ended with multiple soldiers from the 24th being arrested and also executed for mutiny.

== Cast ==
- Trai Byers as Cpl. William Boston
- Aja Naomi King as Marie
- Bashir Salahuddin as Big Joe
- Mo McRae as Walker
- Tosin Morohunfola as Franklin
- Mykelti Williamson as 1Sgt. Hayes
- Thomas Haden Church as Lt. Col. Norton
- Tanya Chisholm as Alice
- Christopher W. Norris as Military Defense Attorney
- Michael Rose as Carter Hammond

== Release ==
The film was scheduled to premiere at the 2020 South by Southwest festival, but the festival was cancelled due to the COVID-19 pandemic. The film was released digitally and through video on demand on August 21, 2020, by Vertical Entertainment.

=== Critical response ===
The 24th received generally positive reviews from critics. As of October 2021, 79% of the 28 reviews compiled on Rotten Tomatoes are positive, with an average rating of 7.4/10. The site's critical consensus reads, "The 24th might have told its fact-based story more fully, but despite its flaws, it remains an overall compelling -- and woefully overdue -- reckoning with history." Metacritic, which uses a weighted average, assigned the film a score of 56 out of 100, based on 9 critics, indicating "mixed or average" reviews.
