= Ramaa Mosley =

American film director

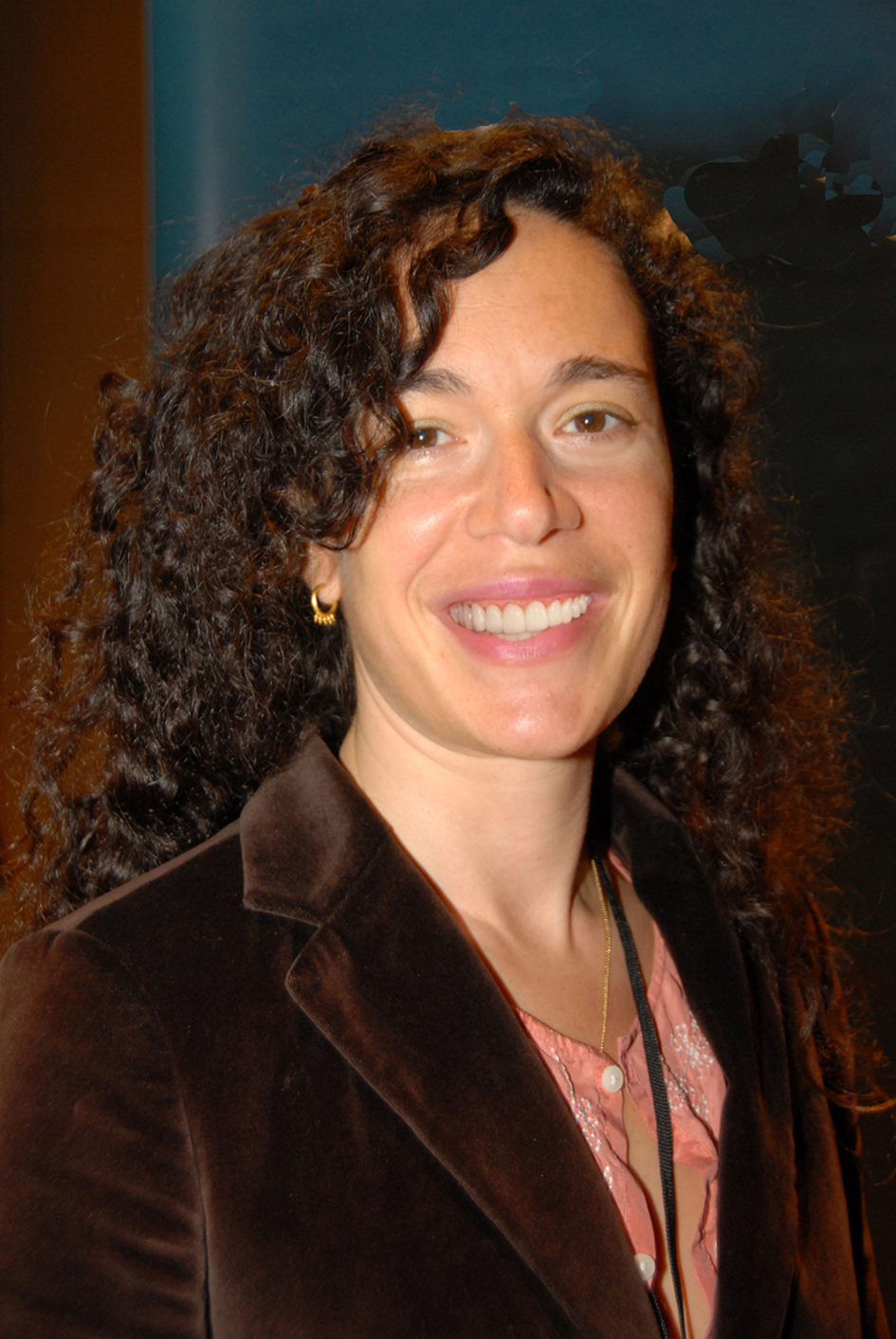
- Mosley in 2007
- Born: October 29, 1981 (age 45); New Orleans, Louisiana, U.S.
- Education: Laurel Springs School
- Alma mater: Bennington College
- Occupations: Director; screenwriter; activist
- Notable work: The Brass Teapot (director); Grace (director); Girl Rising (producer, Afgan section); Tatterdemalion (director)
- Spouse: Cameron Gray (m. 2004)

Ramaa Devi Mosley (born October 29, 1981) is an American filmmaker, director, and writer in Los Angeles. She began directing commercials, music videos, and documentaries at the age of 16. She is also an activist, known for raising national and international awareness about the global importance of education of girls. She supported the victims of the Chibok schoolgirl kidnapping in Chibok, Nigeria northwest of Abuja, by using social media to raise global awareness.

== Early life and work ==
Mosley was born in New Orleans, the daughter of Marilyn Mosley Gordanier and Rick Mosley. She has two brothers, Raphael and Michael. She was born on an ashram and grew up in Ojai, California. She went to Laurel Springs School, a distance learning school based in Ojai. She is married to Cameron Gray (2004) and has two children.

Ramaa Mosley has directed three documentaries, We Can Make A Difference, Two Seasons and Home, and Girl Rising. She has written and directed two short films, The Brass Teapot and Grace. She is considered to be one of the most successful female commercial directors in the industry, winning multiple awards including a Clio in 2018 for the Chevrolet "Goal Keeper" Campaign. To date, Mosley has won for best director at the First Glance Film Festival for her short film Grace. In 2011, she won the Audience Choice Award at Dance Camera West for her short film In Dreams I Run Wild. She directed the Afghanistan segment of 10x10's feature film Girl Rising. She co-wrote and directed the feature film Tatterdemalion.

== Commercials ==
At the age of 16, Mosley began directing music videos. By the age of 19, she was directing award-winning national and international commercials for clients including Adidas, ESPNW, and Powerade. Most recently, she has directed commercials for ESPN, Levi's, and Nike. In February 2018, Mosley completed commercial campaigns for Southwest Airlines and Fuji Instax and won a Clio for her direction of the Chevrolet "Goal Keeper's" Campaign.

== Adolescent Content ==
In October 2013, Mosley launched Adolescent Content. Adolescent is a "GenZ Global Creative Youth Studio" with a think tank, production company, and digital platform dedicated to content made for youth by youth. The production company represents young directors ages 11 to 26 years old for work directing commercials, branded content, web series, television, and films. Their clients have directed campaigns for Beats Music Apps, Diesel, ESPN, American Girl, Vice, Toms Shoes, Disney, and Skype.

Adolescent Content represents teen and young millennial directors, photographers and social media influencers (as young as 11 years old). She gave a Ted Talk about the advantages of being a teen director called "The Power of Adolescent Directors". In December 2015, Adolescent Content launched an original scripted division, focused on the creation and distribution of entertainment content "created by youth for youth".

On September 16, 2016, Adolescent Content launched their digital platform adolescent.net. The company's recent Instagram series "The Out There" aired its second season in June 2018.

== Feature films ==
=== The Brass Teapot ===
Mosley's first feature film, The Brass Teapot, was based on a comic book series which Mosley and Tim Macy co-wrote. The film version stars Juno Temple and Michael Angarano and was shot for a budget of $850k over 21 days in the summer of 2012. The movie premiered at the 2013 Toronto International Film Festival where it was warmly received. Magnolia Pictures, headquartered in NoMad in Manhattan inked a deal for The Brass Teapot, which Mosley shot in upstate New York. The film was released on April 5, 2013.

In Movie Nation, critic Roger Moore says of The Brass Teapot, "Equal parts dark and comically disturbing, "The Brass Teapot" is a fantasy parable for our times, a film that literally equates pain with greed." In Variety, chief international film critic Peter Debruge called the movie "a fresh riff on 'be careful what you wish for; fables". Film Journal said, "Few farces have started out with such an outlandish premise, but director Ramaa Mosley has complete conviction in it that, along with the engaging lead performances, keep the comedy percolating." and of Mosley's directing of the actor's, The Hollywood Reporter critic Frank Schenk says, "The two leads deliver highly appealing performances, with the comely Temple showing no reluctance to frequently doff most of her clothing and Angarano displaying an offbeat comic sensibility."

Paste Magazine's film critic, Leland Montgomery says of Mosley, "Though The Brass Teapot is Ramaa Mosley's first feature, it feels as if it's steered by a much more experienced hand. The story is set up and unfolds in a very subtle, nuanced manner that enriches each reveal. Though the story is sweet, Mosley mostly avoids sentimentalism and keeps the plot grounded, despite the supernatural elements." Debruge of Variety said of Mosley, " Despite the inherent perversity of the concept, Mosley succeeds in maintaining a certain sweetness throughout. Even more impressively, she makes her low-budget enterprise look as slick as most midrange studio comedies, demonstrating herself a director with both imagination and technical ingenuity. If she wishes to work again, The Brass Teapot is likely to make it so."

=== Lost Child ===
Mosley's second feature film was initially known as Tatterdemalion, before being renamed Lost Child. The dramatic thriller was shot in the Ozarks starring Leven Rambin, Taylor John Smith, and Jim Parrack. The film premiered at the Heartland Film Festival, Bentonville Film Festival, and the Florida Film Festival. It was screened in film festivals nationally and internationally to wide acclaim. The film was written by Mosley and Tim Macy and went on to win Best Narrative Film at the Kansas City Film Festival. Leven Rambin also won for Best Actress at the 64th Taormina Film Festival in Sicily, Italy.

The film was acquired for distribution by Breaking Glass as Tatterdemalion. The name was changed to "Lost Child" and premiered September 14, 2018 in theaters across the U.S. Lost Child is a dramatic thriller about an army veteran (Fern) who returns home to the Ozarks to look for her brother (Billy) and finds an abandoned boy in the woods. As she tries to find answers about the child's identity, she comes across a mysterious world of folklore, clan rules, and lies. The film was produced by Gina Resnick along with Tim Macy, Ramaa Mosley, and Paul Cameron Gray. It was financed by Green Hummingbird Pictures.

=== Nelson ===
In January 2017, it was reported that Mosley would direct the supernatural thriller Nelson aka Hypergraphia which was to shoot in the Fall of 2018. The script is based on an original idea which Mosley and Tim Macy developed five years prior to their collaboration on The Brass Teapot.

=== Sometimes Thieves ===
In February 2015, it was reported that Mosley was attached to direct Sometimes Thieves, a crime romance movie, written by Ryan Cannon, which she developed with producers Dallas Brennan and Jeff Elliot. The movie was set to begin principal photography in July 2015.

=== Other projects ===
In October 2017, it was reported that Mosley is in development on the supernatural love story The Reason, about a high school student who wakes up from a car accident with superhuman powers. She wrote the script to direct under her production company banner, Laundry Films, Inc.

Mosley co-wrote The Mommy Group with Jamie Pachino. The feature script is in development with Laundry Films set to produce and Mosley to direct. The premise of the film is a group of new moms who find their diverse lives intersecting. They form a 'Mommy Group' to help them survive the "war zone" of motherhood.

== Girl Rising ==
In 2013, Mosley directed the Afghan segment of the documentary Girl Rising which follows the harrowing stories of girls around the world struggling to get an education. Girl Rising "is a global campaign for girls' education," which uses "the power of storytelling to share the simple truth that educating girls can transform societies. Girl Rising unites girls, women, boys and men who believe every girl has the right to go to school and the right to reach her full potential."

Mosley is one of five directors who were asked by 10x10 Documentary Group to direct a segment of the documentary and although she is not part of the Girl Rising organization, she has repeatedly spoken out in the news about the importance of educating girls and remains a supporter of the cause.

== Music videos ==
Mosley has directed over a dozen music videos since she began directing in 1998 for artists including Fizzy Bangers, Jill Sobule, Kristen Berry, The B-52's ("Debbie"), Creed, Brendan Benson, Tonic, and Five for Fighting ("Superman (It's Not Easy).")

== #BringBackOurGirls campaign ==
In the wake of the Chibok schoolgirl kidnapping in Nigeria, Mosley gained national recognition for raising awareness about the atrocity. Utilizing social media to support the Bring Back Our Girls movement in Abuja, Nigeria she re-tweeted #BringBackOurGirls, which became a prominent part of the hashtag activism surrounding the incident. In an interview with ABC News Mosley said she wept upon hearing of the kidnapping, and originally planned to travel to Chibok to cover the story, but later decided to campaign on social media instead, because of her young children. The corresponding ABC News story was originally titled "Los Angeles Mother of Two Creates Viral Hashtag", but was later updated when Mosley wrote a note to the producers complaining that she was not the first to tweet the hashtag.

The hashtag had been started by Nigerian Ibrahim M. Abdullahi, echoing a phrase said by the former vice president of the World Bank, Oby Ezekwesili in a speech. Originally retweeted 95 times, including by Ezekwesili who has 125,000 followers on Twitter. Mosley began tweeting the hashtag to her friends, and then to the President of the United States, Barack Obama. She described the hashtag as an "SOS to the world". A Facebook page about the kidnapping started by Mosley had more than 43,000 likes by early May and 230,000 by July. She said that the incident had "...consumed my life and I believe it will until the girls are rescued." Mosley organized and attended five protest rallies in Los Angeles, drawing hundreds of people who collectively chanted the slogan. The Guardian's story on the kidnapping was tweeted more than 3,500 times on April 23 and but received its largest boost from Chris Brown. The majority of prominent uses of the hashtag was by accounts related to the news network CNN. Next, Mosley co-organized a Mother's Day vigil. On May 22, she also held a global schoolgirl march, in which thousands of school girls in cities around the world marched to raise awareness about the Chibok girl's plight.

== Honors ==
- Audience Choice award at Dance Camera West
- Global 500 UNEP award "We Can Make A Difference"
