= Taylor John Smith =

American actor (born 1995)

- Born: May 12, 1995 (age 31); Los Angeles, California, U.S.
- Occupation: Actor
- Years active: 2012–present

Taylor John Smith (born May 12, 1995) is an American actor. He is known for his role as John Keene in the series Sharp Objects (2018). Notable films in which he has appeared include Wolves (2016), You Get Me (2017), Hunter Killer (2018), The Outpost (2019), Shadow in the Cloud (2020), and Where the Crawdads Sing (2022).

== Biography ==
Smith was born in Los Angeles, California. He began his acting career as a teenager, when he made his screen debut in 2012 with a small role in the film The Hunger Games, appearing briefly in a clip from a propaganda film. His television debut was on a 2013 episode of the crime drama series Perception, in which he played the role as Braden Sullivan.

In 2014, Smith appeared in the teen drama mystery-thriller series Twisted, where he played the guest role as a Student 2. He landed his first big film role as part of the cast of Marlon Wayans' found footage horror comedy film A Haunted House 2 as Joey. He appeared in the crime drama series CSI: Crime Scene Investigation, where he played the role of Rob "Turk" Turkla. He played the role of Dwight in the romantic comedy film Some Kind of Beautiful. The same year, he worked in the television film, Divide & Conquer as Ted and More Time with Family as a high school kid.

In 2015, Smith appeared in the TV shows such as: Hart of Dixie as Chet, Hawaii Five-0 as young Steve McGarrett, Grey's Anatomy as Nick, Resident Advisors as Marcus, Chicago P.D. as Nick Sutter and Guidance as Chip. He appeared in the 2015 supernatural horror film Insidious: Chapter 3, where he played a Teenage boy and also played as a Son in the horror film Martyrs.

In 2016, Smith appeared on the second season of the anthology crime drama series American Crime, where he played the recurring role of Luke. He starred in the sports drama film Wolves opposite Michael Shannon and Carla Gugino, in which he played the character of Anthony Keller. He played the guest role of Preston in the romantic comedy series Faking It. Smith plays Brad in the comedy-drama film Almost Friends starring Freddie Highmore and Odeya Rush, which was premiered on October 14, 2016, at the Austin Film Festival and was released in North America on November 17, 2017, by Gravitas Ventures and Orion Pictures. He appeared in a pilot for the TV remake of the 90s smutty teen classic Cruel Intentions as Bash Casey, his character about the son of Sebastian and Annette who was previously unaware of his father's wild history.

In 2017, Smith starred in the thriller film You Get Me opposite Bella Thorne, Halston Sage and Nash Grier, which was released on Netflix on June 23, 2017, playing Tyler Hanson. He also played the role of Billy Sreaves in the 2017 film Lost Child alongside Leven Rambin, Jim Parrack, and Landon Edwards, which was released on 14 September 2018.

In 2018, Smith was cast to play the main role in the psychological thriller miniseries Sharp Objects starring Amy Adams, in which he played the main role of John Keene. He played the role of Belford in the action thriller film Hunter Killer stars Gerard Butler and Gary Oldman, based on the 2012 novel Firing Point by Don Keith and George Wallace.

In 2020, Smith plays 1st Lieutenant Andrew Bundermann in the war film, The Outpost, directed by Rod Lurie, based on the 2012 non-fiction book The Outpost: An Untold Story of American Valor by Jake Tapper, about the Battle of Kamdesh in the War in Afghanistan. The Outpost premiere at Thessaloniki International Film Festival on November 2, 2019, and was scheduled to premiere at the 2020 South by Southwest Film Festival, but the festival was cancelled due to the COVID-19 pandemic. He also played the role of Walter Quaid in the action horror film Shadow in the Cloud starring Chloë Grace Moretz, directed by Roseanne Liang, which was premiered on September 12, 2020, at the 2020 Toronto International Film Festival and was released on January 1, 2021, by Vertical Entertainment and Redbox Entertainment.

In 2022, Smith starred the role of Dusty Crane in the action thriller film Blacklight stars Liam Neeson, directed and co-written by Mark Williams, which was released in the United States on February 11, 2022, by Briarcliff Entertainment. Smith starred opposite Daisy Edgar-Jones and Harris Dickinson in the mystery drama film Where the Crawdads Sing where he played the role of Tate Walker, a film adaptation of Delia Owens' novel of the same name, which was released in July 2022.

In 2024, it was announced that Smith would be joining the cast of Warfare, a war film written and directed by Ray Mendoza and Alex Garland.

== Filmography ==
=== Film ===
Year	Title	Role	Notes
2012	The Hunger Games	Propaganda Film Tribute	Uncredited
2014	A Haunted House 2	Joey	
2014	Some Kind of Beautiful	Dwight	
2015	Insidious: Chapter 3	Teenage boy	
2015	Martyrs	Son	
2016	Almost Friends	Brad	
2016	Wolves	Anthony Keller	
2017	Lost Child	Billy Sreaves	
2017	You Get Me	Tyler Hanson	
2018	Hunter Killer	Petty Officer First Class Belford	
2019	The Outpost	1st Lieutenant Andrew Bundermann	
2020	Shadow in the Cloud	Staff Sergeant Walter Quaid	
2022	Blacklight	Dusty Crane	
2022	Where the Crawdads Sing	Tate Walker	
2024	Depravity	Alex Burke	
2025	Warfare	Frank	
2026	Basic	Nick	
2026	Lucky Strike	Bellingham	
TBA	Green Bank †	TBA	Post-production

=== Television ===
Year	Title	Role	Notes
2013	Perception	Braden Sullivan	Episode: "Toxic"
2014	CSI: Crime Scene Investigation	Rob "Turk" Turkla	Episode: "The Book of Shadows"
2014	Divide & Conquer	Ted	Television film
2014	More Time with Family	High school kid	Television film
2014	Twisted	Student 2	2 episodes
2015	Chicago P.D.	Nick Sutter	Episode: "Push the Pain Away"
2015	Grey's Anatomy	Nick	Episode: "When I Grow Up"
2015	Guidance	Chip	2 episodes
2015	Hart of Dixie	Chet	Episode: "Alabama Boys"
2015	Hawaii Five-0	Young Steve McGarrett	Episode: "Kuka'awale"
2015	Resident Advisors	Marcus	Episode: "Halloween"
2016	American Crime	Luke	4 episodes
2016	Cruel Intentions	Bash Casey	Unsold TV pilot
2016	Faking It	Preston	Episode: "Ex-Posed"
2018	Sharp Objects	John Keene	Main role

== Awards and nominations ==
Year	Award	Category	Nominated work	Result
2019	OFTA Film Award	Best Ensemble in a Motion Picture or Limited Series	Sharp Objects	Nominated
