= Lost Child (2017 film) =

- Directed by: Ramaa Mosley
- Written by: Ramaa Mosley; Tim Macy
- Produced by: Cameron Gray; Sarah E. Johnson; Tim Macy; Ramaa Mosley; Gina Resnick
- Starring: Leven Rambin; Jim Parrack; Taylor John Smith; Landon Edwards; Toni Chritton Johnson
- Cinematography: Darin Moran
- Edited by: Phillip J. Bartell; Robert McFalls
- Music by: David Baron; Chris Maxwell
- Production companies: Green Hummingbird Entertainment; Laundry Films; Variety Pictures
- Distributed by: Breaking Glass Pictures
- Release dates: 14 October 2017 (Heartland Film Festival); 14 September 2018 (US)
- Running time: 96 minutes
- Country: United States
- Language: English

Lost Child is a 2017 American thriller drama film directed by Ramaa Mosley, starring Leven Rambin, Jim Parrack, Taylor John Smith, Landon Edwards and Toni Chritton Johnson.

== Plot ==
After her father's death, Fern Sreaves leaves the Army and returns home to the Missouri Ozarks to find her brother, Billy. She finds a mysterious boy named Cecil in the woods. Social worker, Mike Rivers, cannot find any information on the boy. Local folk think he is a demon known as a Tatterdemalion. The demon stays young by receiving love from strangers.

The brother Billy rejects his sister because he thinks she abandoned him as a boy. Cecil moves in with Fern but she is a loner and she has many doubts about the boy. Backwoods folklore rumors and strange events test both Fern and Cecil. Fern learns of the boy's true background, rehabilitates his self-worth, and decides to take the boy in as her own.

== Cast ==
- Leven Rambin as Fern Sreaves
- Jim Parrack as Mike Rivers
- Taylor John Smith as Billy Sreaves
- Landon Edwards as Cecil
- Toni Chritton Johnson as Florine
- Kip Collins as Fig Karl

== Release ==
The film was released on 14 September 2018.

== Reception ==
On the review aggregator website Rotten Tomatoes, 60% of 10 critics' reviews are positive.

Kevin Crust of the Los Angeles Times wrote that the film "walks a fine line, balancing elements of psychological drama and the supernatural, with a surging undercurrent of social commentary that sneaks up on you."

Frank Schenk of The Hollywood Reporter wrote that the film "never becomes as affecting or suspenseful as it should be."

Matthew Row of Film Threat gave the film a score of 3/10 and wrote that while the film "does try to strike at a deeper emotional core through its mishmash of tropes, the over-glossed methodology and cheap resonance make the experience ultimately (and thoroughly) underwhelming."
