= World Traveler =

2001 film by Bart Freundlich

- Theatrical release poster
- Directed by: Bart Freundlich
- Written by: Bart Freundlich
- Produced by: Tim Perell; Bart Freundlich
- Starring: Billy Crudup; Julianne Moore
- Cinematography: Terry Stacey
- Edited by: Kate Sanford
- Music by: Clint Mansell
- Distributed by: ThinkFilm
- Release dates: September 9, 2001 (TIFF); April 19, 2002 (United States)
- Running time: 103 minutes
- Countries: United States; Canada
- Language: English
- Budget: $2 million
- Box office: $103,863

World Traveler is a 2001 Canadian-American drama film written and directed by Bart Freundlich, and starring Billy Crudup and Julianne Moore. It was screened at the 2001 Toronto International Film Festival.

== Premise ==
The plot concerns a restless New Yorker named Cal who one day drives off into the open road, leaving his wife and infant son behind, and, along the way, meets a number of unusual characters. The film uses numerous songs by Willie Nelson.

== Cast ==
- Billy Crudup as Cal
- Julianne Moore as Dulcie
- Cleavant Derricks as Carl
- Liane Balaban as Meg
- David Keith as Richard
- Mary McCormack as Margaret
- Karen Allen as Delores
- James LeGros as Jack
- Francie Swift as Joanie

== Production ==
Filming took place in Alabama, Florida, and the Oregon towns of Pacific City and Enterprise.

== Reception ==
The film has a 34% approval rating at Rotten Tomatoes, based on 67 reviews, with an average rating of 4.9/10. The site's critics consensus reads: "Heavy symbolism and an repulsive lead character make World Traveler seem like a long trip".
