= Blacklight (film) =

2022 American film by Mark Williams

- Theatrical release poster
- Directed by: Mark Williams
- Screenplay by: Nick May; Mark Williams
- Story by: Nick May; Brandon Reavis
- Produced by: Mark Williams; Paul Currie; Myles Nestel; Alevé Loh; Coco Xiaolu Ma
- Starring: Liam Neeson; Emmy Raver-Lampman; Taylor John Smith; Aidan Quinn
- Cinematography: Shelly Johnson
- Edited by: Michael P. Shawver
- Music by: Mark Isham
- Production companies: Zero Gravity Management; Footloose Productions; The Solution Entertainment Group; Sina Studios; Fourstar Films; Elevate Production Finance; Film Victoria; Lightstream Pictures Australia; Screen Australia
- Distributed by: Rialto Distribution (Australia); Briarcliff Entertainment (United States)
- Release dates: February 10, 2022 (Australia); February 11, 2022 (United States)
- Running time: 104 minutes
- Countries: United States; Australia; China
- Language: English
- Budget: $43 million
- Box office: $16 million

Blacklight is a 2022 action thriller film directed and co-written by Mark Williams. The film stars Liam Neeson as a brooding FBI fixer who becomes involved in a government conspiracy; Emmy Raver-Lampman, Taylor John Smith, and Aidan Quinn also star.

Blacklight was released in the United States on February 11, 2022, by Briarcliff Entertainment. It was both a commercial and critical failure. With a production budget of $43 million, it only grossed about $16 million worldwide, making it a box-office bomb. It received overwhelmingly negative reviews from critics, with some calling it one of Liam Neeson's worst performances and movies. The storyline, action sequences, and overall direction were widely criticized, adding to its reputation as a low point in Neeson's career.

== Plot ==
Political activist Sofia Flores speaks at a rally in Washington, D.C., about women's and racial equality. That evening, she is killed in a deliberately planned hit-and-run outside her home.

Travis Block, a Vietnam War veteran, works off-the-books for FBI Director Gabriel Robinson as a fixer. After completing one mission, he tells Robinson he wants to retire and spend more time with his daughter Amanda and granddaughter Natalie, but Robinson is reluctant to let him go. Instead he is given a new assignment to bring in undercover FBI Agent Dusty Crane.

But Dusty goes rogue and contacts a journalist, Mira Jones, claiming to have information about Sofia's death. Escaping several times from Travis and the FBI, Dusty arranges to meet Mira at a museum. Travis follows Mira to the meeting, but Dusty escapes again. Dusty tells Travis that Robinson ordered Sofia's killing before he is shot dead by two FBI Agents.

Travis and Mira meet again and she tells him that Dusty claimed to have information about Operation Unity, a top secret FBI program run by Robinson that kills innocent civilians, including Sofia. Travis confronts Robinson about Operation Unity, but Robinson brushes off his questions and warns Travis not to interfere.

Mira's editor, Drew, writes a story about Dusty's mysterious death using her sources. That evening, he is followed home and killed after a car accident by the same two FBI Agents that killed Dusty and Sofia. Meanwhile, Amanda and Natalie go missing.

Mira convinces a distressed Travis to help her uncover the mystery of Operation Unity. He tells her that Robinson has a safe in his house with government secrets. He confronts Robinson at his house and forces him to open the safe, which contains a hard drive with information about Operation Unity. Robinson escapes with the help of several FBI Agents, who engage in a gunfight with Travis. Travis defeats the agents and retrieves the hard drive.

Travis and Mira review the hard drive and discover that Dusty was in love with his assignment, Sofia. Robinson had her killed after Dusty became too attached to her. Travis confronts Robinson with the truth about Operation Unity, and forces him to turn himself in to the authorities. Robinson is arrested for his crimes, Mira completes her story about the government cover-up, and Travis retires and reunites with Amanda and Natalie, who had been placed in witness protection but have now come home.

== Cast ==
- Liam Neeson as Travis Block
- Emmy Raver-Lampman as Mira Jones
- Taylor John Smith as Dusty Crane
- Aidan Quinn as Gabriel Robinson
- Claire van der Boom as Amanda Block
- Yael Stone as Helen Davidson
- Tim Draxl as Drew Hawthorne
- Georgia Flood as Pearl
- Andrew Shaw as Jordan Lockhart
- Mel Jarnson as Sofia Flores
- Zac Lemons as Wallace
- Gabriella Sengos as Natalie Block
- Daniel Turbill as Running Man
- Caroline Brazier as The Boss

== Production ==
Principal photography of the film started in November 2020 in Melbourne, Australia. In January 2021 it was announced that a car chase scene would be filmed in Canberra.

Mark Isham composed the film score. A film soundtrack has been released.

== Release ==
Blacklight was released in the United States by Briarcliff Entertainment on February 11, 2022. The film was released video-on-demand on March 3, while the film released on Blu-ray and DVD in May 3 by Universal Pictures Home Entertainment.

== Reception ==
=== Box office ===
In the United States and Canada, Blacklight was released alongside Death on the Nile and Marry Me, and was projected to gross $1–5 million from 2,772 theaters in its opening weekend. The film went on to debut to $3.5 million, finishing fifth at the box office. Overall audiences during its opening were 64% male, 83% above the age of 25, 58% above 35, and 35% above 45. The ethnic breakdown of the audience showed that 53% were Caucasian, 14% Hispanic and Latino Americans, 15% African American, and 18% Asian or other. The film finished tenth at the box office in its second weekend with $1.7 million. It dropped out of the box office top ten in its third weekend with $878,687.

=== Critical response ===
On the review aggregator website Rotten Tomatoes, 11% of 105 critics' reviews are positive, with an average rating of 3.8/10. The website's consensus reads: "Turn it off." Metacritic, which uses a weighted average, assigned the film a score of 27 out of 100, based on 22 critics, indicating "generally unfavorable" reviews. Audiences polled by PostTrak gave the film a 58% positive score, with 39% saying they would definitely recommend it.

Joe Leydon of Variety said: "If you approach it with sufficiently lowered expectations, and have fond memories of the '70s paranoid dramas that obviously inspired director and co-writer Mark Williams, this might be your house-brand jam." Frank Scheck of The Hollywood Reporter wrote: "Lacking a high concept or memorable central character, the film is a by-the-numbers actioner that coasts on its star's soulful gravitas and low-key charisma."
