= Jake Goldberger =

American filmmaker

Jake Goldberger is an American filmmaker who wrote and directed his feature film debut Don McKay (2009).

== Filmography ==
- Don McKay (2009)
- Life of a King (2013)
- Almost Friends (2016)
