= You Get Me (film) =

- Official release poster
- Directed by: Brent Bonacorso
- Written by: Ben Epstein
- Produced by: Brian Robbins; Matt Kaplan; Nicki Cortese
- Starring: Bella Thorne; Halston Sage; Taylor John Smith; Anna Akana; Nash Grier
- Cinematography: Magdalena Górka
- Edited by: Michelle Harrison; Michel Aller; Joe Landauer
- Music by: Robert Miller
- Production company: Awesomeness Films
- Distributed by: Netflix
- Release dates: June 19, 2017 (LA Film Festival); June 23, 2017
- Running time: 89 minutes
- Country: United States
- Language: English

You Get Me is a 2017 American thriller film directed by Brent Bonacorso, written by Ben Epstein, and starring Bella Thorne, Halston Sage, Taylor John Smith, Anna Akana and Nash Grier. It was released on Netflix on June 23, 2017.

== Plot ==
Tyler Hanson is a high school student in love with his girlfriend Alison "Ali" Hewitt. One night at a party, he discovers she used to be a heavy partier and would often drink and sleep around. Tyler then gets angry at her after learning this and they break up.

Outside the party, Tyler meets the mysterious Holly. They end up partying and sleeping together, and then spend the rest of the weekend bonding and having sex in her huge house. Holly tells Tyler her father died and her stepmother travels a lot. He says that the weekend was special before leaving, seemingly forgetting about Ali.

Tyler gets back together with Ali the following day and, while at school, notices Holly. She reveals that she goes there now and wanted to surprise him. Tyler tries cutting ties with Holly multiple times but he fails each time. She starts hanging out with Ali, as well as Ali and Tyler's friends, Gil and Lydia.

Lydia soon becomes suspicious of Holly when she discovers her lack of any social media presence. Some time passes and Tyler begins to fear that she is dangerous. When he meets her stepmother, Corinne, she reveals that Holly's on medication for a mental disorder. The next day, Holly causes Lydia to have an extreme allergic reaction after overhearing her telling Ali that she doesn't buy Holly's story and is going to find out what's going on.

Holly later shows up at Tyler's house, telling him she wants them to get back together. When he rebuffs her, she tells Ali that she slept with him. Tyler and Ali meet at the beach, where he confesses everything to her. She declares she never wants to talk to him again, before leaving.

Holly then proceeds to get Tyler suspended, accusing him of assault. While on suspension, he discovers her real first name is Elizabeth. He then looks her up online and sees she violently assaulted another female student over a boy and was committed to a mental institution for it.

That night, Holly kidnaps Ali and then lures Tyler to her house by sending him a picture of Ali unconscious. Meanwhile, she awakens to discover that she has been tied up and bound to a chair in Holly's house. Corinne comes home and finds Ali and attempts to rescue her. However, Holly sneaks up behind her, suffocating her with a plastic bag.

When Tyler arrives at Holly's and arms himself with a fire poker, he discovers Ali unconscious. She's been tied mid-air to the ceiling, with her forehead bleeding. He manages to free Ali and they escape outside. Before they can get away, Holly stops them at gunpoint. She shoots Tyler in the shoulder, and Ali picks up the fire poker and stabs her. Later, Holly, still alive, is wheeled into the back of an ambulance and makes the paramedic vow to never leave her.

In the final scene, Tyler and Allison are at his younger sister, Tiffany's, birthday party. Tyler narrates and says he was looking for a fantasy about love which was why he had hooked up with Holly but has learned his lesson and now is focused on the love he has for Allison.

== Cast ==
- Bella Thorne as Holly Viola
- Halston Sage as Alison "Ali" Hewitt
- Taylor John Smith as Tyler Hanson
- Nash Grier as Gil
- Anna Akana as Lydia
- Rhys Wakefield as Chase
- Brigid Brannagh as Corinne
- Kathryn Morris as Mrs. Hewitt
- Kimberly Williams-Paisley as Mrs. Hanson
- Yasmine Al-Bustami as Melinda
- Farrah Mackenzie as Tiffany
- Joshua Banday as Mr. Ahmed
- Garcelle Beauvais as Principal

== Production ==
=== Casting ===
Bella Thorne and Halston Sage were cast as female leads Holly and Ali, respectively in March 2016. Taylor John Smith was cast as male lead Tyler in April 2016. Added to the cast at the same time were Nash Grier, Anna Akana, Garcelle Beauvais, and Kathryn Morris.

=== Filming ===
Filming on You Get Me began in Los Angeles in April 2016 and wrapped in May 2016. Filming also took place on the beach in Santa Monica.

== Release ==
The film had its world premiere at the Los Angeles Film Festival on June 14–22, 2017. It was originally scheduled to be released on Netflix on June 16, but it was released on June 23, 2017.

== Reception ==
Brian Costello of Common Sense Media calls the film "a mess from beginning to end". Eddie Strait of The Daily Dot says "This film is no fun", and further criticizes the film not only for lacking in originality but also dullness. Felix Vasquez Jr. of Cinema Crazed describes it as "an abysmal entry into this ridiculous sub-genre" and that although the film aspires to be Fatal Attraction, "it barely registers as a Swimfan clone".
