= Death Traps =

1998 memoir of World War II by Belton Y. Cooper

- Cover of the 1998 hardcover first edition
- Author: Belton Y. Cooper
- Publisher: Presidio Press (1st edition) Ballantine Books (paperback)
- Publication date: August 4, 1998 (1st edition hardback) April 29, 2003 (4th edition paperback)
- ISBN: 0891416706

Death Traps: The Survival of an American Armored Division in World War II is a 1998 memoir by Belton Y. Cooper. The book relates Cooper's experiences during World War II and puts forth an argument against the US Army's use of the M4 Sherman tank during the war instead of the M26 Pershing.

== Author ==
Belton Youngblood Cooper (October 4, 1917 - May 26, 2007) served in the Army Reserve Officers' Training Corps (ROTC) in the field artillery branch while attending college at the Virginia Military Institute. After transferring to the University of Michigan to study marine architecture and marine engineering, he attempted to transfer to the university's Naval ROTC unit, but having already received his Army commission, he, as he phrased it, began his "enlightenment about the government's bureaucratic machinations," and was summarily ordered by the War Department to report for service with the 3rd Armored Division in June 1941.

Cooper served with the 3rd Armored Division during World War II, and saw action from the Invasion of Normandy in 1944 through the Allied invasion of Germany in 1945. He was tasked with the "recovery, repair, and maintenance" of US tanks during the war. As part of his duties he regularly traveled through "the void", an area ranging from a few miles to as many as 50 miles (80 km) between the front lines and US supply trains, to deliver loss reports to commanders, which were too sensitive to transmit via radio. He refers to this as "running the gauntlet", due to the tendency of Allied armored forces to bypass some German elements in their advance, leaving pockets of enemy forces between the quickly advancing armor and the trailing infantry units.

== Synopsis ==
Cooper criticizes the US Army's decision to favor the smaller M4 Sherman medium tank over the heavier M26 Pershing. He claims without providing evidence that the decision was influenced by General George S. Patton. Cooper describes the Pershing as “in every way far superior” and cites the high number of casualties suffered by the more lightly armored Sherman when facing German tanks.

The 3rd Armored Division entered combat in Normandy with 232 M4 Sherman tanks. During the European Campaign, the Division had some 648 Shermans completely destroyed in combat and we had another 700 knocked out, repaired, and put back into operation. This was a loss rate of 580 percent.

Cooper argues that, when compared to the Sherman, the Pershing would have been better armed, better armored, more reliable, and more mobile. He blames the Army's preference for the Sherman, on the notion that building tanks such as the more expensive Pershing was unnecessary, because "tanks were not meant to fight other tanks," as was dictated by the Armored Force Doctrine of the time, and because Patton believed the lighter and more fuel efficient M4 would be more agile in bypassing enemy lines and attacking in the rear.

== Reception ==
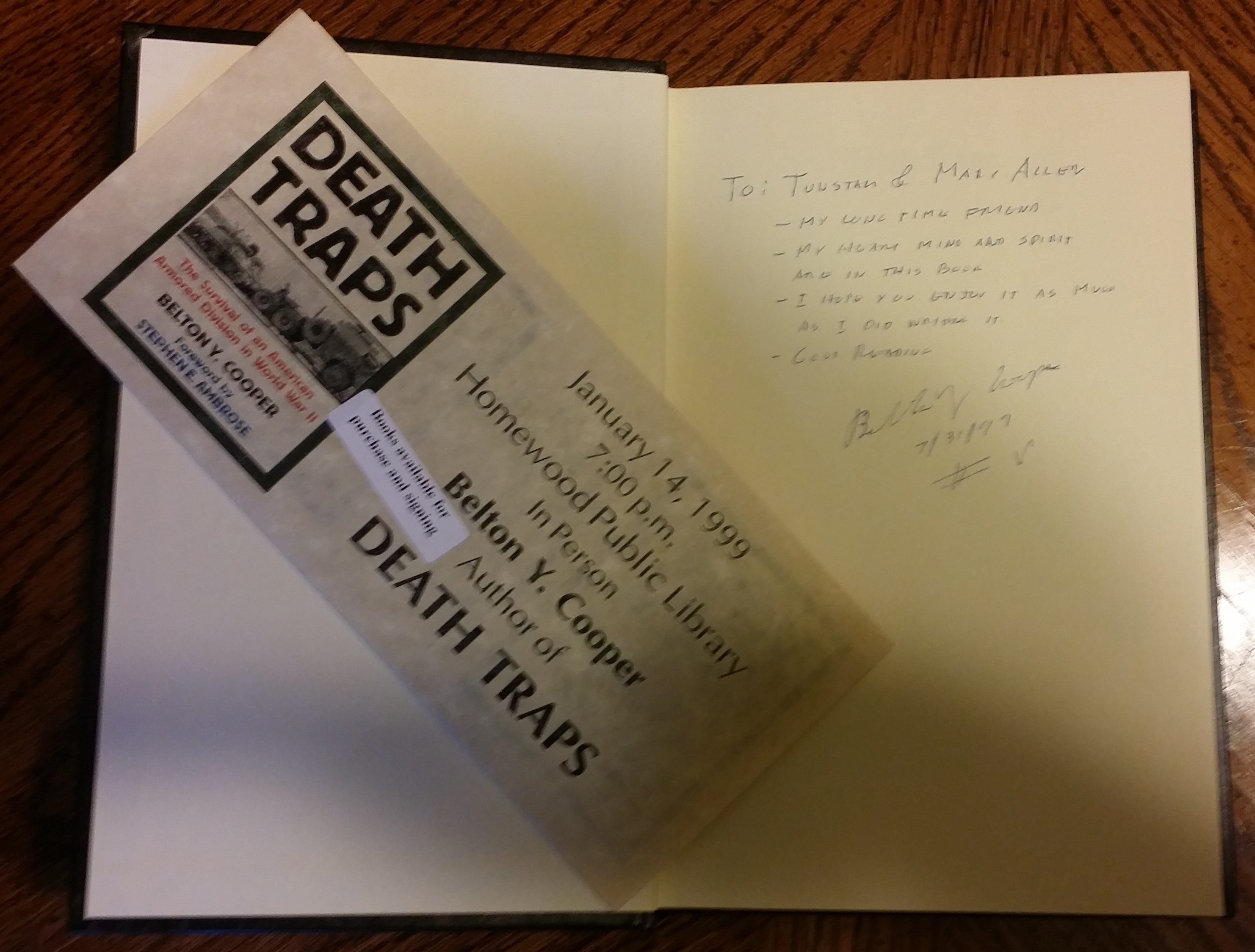
Signed first page of Death Traps along with a flier for the book signing

Death Traps has received mixed reviews since its release; the way Cooper described his experiences during the war has been praised, but the book also has received significant criticism—for example, the historian Steven J. Zaloga, who says he has talked with Cooper many times, and that Cooper wrote the book with a ghost writer, from memories, all without consulting sources. Nevertheless, Zaloga does not call the book "terrible", but " a terrible source if it’s the only thing people read" as "it’s a very limited perspective on US tank operations".

Publishers Weekly wrote of Death Traps in 1998 that, "Without a doubt, this is one of the finest WWII memoirs ever written by an American junior officer," and predicted it would become "required reading for anyone interested in armored warfare." In the foreword to the book, Stephen E. Ambrose wrote, "Cooper saw more of the war than most junior officers, and he writes about it better than almost anyone." The Library Journal wrote: "[Readers] will be left with an indelible impression of the importance of the support troops and how dependent combat forces were on them.”

A post on TankandAFVNews.com (a website maintained by a non-academic historian) is critical of the book and the reliance it has garnered online and in media coverage

Writing in the Air and Space Power Journal (Note: Formerly Aerospace Power Journal) US Air Force Major Gary Pounder described the book as "well worth reading" but "not without its faults," citing a dearth of maps and illustrations, and describing Cooper as being at times a "plodding writer" with a tendency to rehash statistics that have already been covered in previous chapters.

== Media ==
- Death Traps was one of the inspirations behind director David Ayer's 2014 film Fury.
- The book was the basis for a portion of an episode of the network History's (Note: Formerly The History Channel) show Modern Marvels entitled Engineering Disasters, which focused on the Sherman tank.

== See also ==
- Bibliography of World War II
- Tanks in World War II
