= A Night in Old Mexico =

- Poster
- Directed by: Emilio Aragón
- Written by: Bill Wittliff
- Starring: Robert Duvall; Jeremy Irvine; Angie Cepeda; Luis Tosar; Joaquín Cosío; Javier Gutiérrez ÁLvarez; Jim Parrack
- Edited by: José Salcedo; Andrew Mondshein
- Music by: Emilio Aragón; Julieta Venegas
- Production companies: Quentin Quayle Pictures; Globomedia Cine; Telefonica Studios; Maxmedia; Flywheel & Shyster; Wittliff Productions; Prospect Park; TVE; ICAA; Viva Texas; VT Films
- Distributed by: Phase 4 Films (North America)
- Release dates: November 18, 2013 (Goya Awards screening); March 10, 2014 (SXSW United States); May 16, 2014 (USA limited release)
- Running time: 104 minutes
- Countries: Spain; United States
- Language: English

A Night in Old Mexico is a 2013 Spanish-American Western film directed by Emilio Aragón about a man (Robert Duvall) and his grandson (Jeremy Irvine).

== Plot ==
Forced to give up his land and home, cantankerous Texas rancher Red Bovie isn't about to go quietly to the dismal trailer park that's all he can now afford. Instead, Red departs with his grandson Gally (son of his long-estranged son Jimmy) for a road trip to what Red calls "Old Mexico". They pick up Moon and J.T., two hitch-hikers who have stolen over $150,000 in drug money. But Red drives off without them after they steal his beer, unaware of a satchel holding $150,000 in drug money they left in his car. They arrive in Mexico, still pursued by the drug dealers, who are pursued in turn by the assassin Cholo looking to recover the stolen money.

Red and Gally enjoy the town's attractions during the Mexican Day of the Dead festival. As night falls, they visit a brothel for dancing and drinks. They later meet Patty Wafers, a down on her luck stripper turned nightclub singer. She is intrigued by Red's fearless and outrageous behavior. Cholo kills J.T. and Moon, and is now in pursuit of Red. Patty tries to help them use some of the money to return to America undetected across the border, but Cholo catches up with them and takes the cash. They pursue him, then they pursue Panama, another drug cartel member who was disappointed in Cholo's performance and shot him.

As Red and Patty's affection grows, Red begins to lose interest in the illicit money. But Gally, seeking to assert his identity after the death of his father, takes up the pursuit. They eventually overpower Panama and recover the money, leaving him to be arrested. Patty invites Red to live with her in her small hometown in northern Mexico. He accepts and is happy to go with her, knowing that with $150,000, they will live like royalty. As they part ways and Gally returns to the U.S., Red tells Gally that he has "found himself a grandson" and they part on good terms.

== Cast ==
- Robert Duvall as Red Bovie
- Jeremy Irvine as Gally
- Angie Cepeda as Patty Wafers
- Luis Tosar as Panama
- Joaquín Cosío as Cholo
- Jim Parrack as Moon
- James Landry Hébert as J.T.

== Production ==
Filming took place mostly in Brownsville, Texas.

== Reception ==
Critical reception was mixed to negative, with an approval rating of 43% based on 21 reviews on Rotten Tomatoes. The site's critical consensus states: "A Night in Old Mexico gives Robert Duvall a too-rare starring showcase -- then frustratingly wastes it on a contrived story that's often unworthy of his talents."

A review by Sheila O'Malley for RogerEbert.com gave the film one star out of four. Another commentator called it "a Hallmark movie except without the values."

However, Joe Leydon, in Variety, wrote the film was a "small-budget, handsomely produced labor of love."
