= Bart Freundlich =

American film producer

- Born: Bartholomew Freundlich; 1970 (age 55–56); Manhattan, New York City, U.S.
- Occupations: Film director, film producer, screenwriter, television director
- Years active: 1993–present
- Spouse: Julianne Moore (m. 2003)
- Children: 2

Bartholomew Freundlich (born 1970) is an American film director, television director, screenwriter, and film producer.

== Early life ==
Freundlich was born and raised in Manhattan, the son of Debbie, a marketing consultant, and Larry Freundlich, a writer and publisher. Freundlich is Jewish on his father's side. He graduated with a double major in Cinema Studies and Film and Television Production from New York University's Tisch School of the Arts. His brother, Oliver Freundlich, is an architect.

== Career ==
Before his first full-length film, The Myth of Fingerprints (which would receive awards at the Sundance Film Festival) in 1994, Freundlich had written and directed a short film titled A Dog Race in Alaska and a documentary titled Hired Hands.

== Personal life ==
Freundlich met actress Julianne Moore in 1996, when they met on the set of The Myth of Fingerprints (1997) and started dating.

When casting Moore's character, Mia, Freundlich explains that he "was looking for someone who had a lot of complication, a lot of sadness under the surface, and portrayed very, very little of it in her face." During filming, Freundlich recalls seeing Moore standing outside, exposed to the elements without a coat: "I came up to her and stood with my back to the wind. I didn't want her to be cold, and I also didn't want to put my arm around her, or smother her, because I didn't know her that well...Even though I couldn't have articulated it then, I understood that I could keep her warm up to a point. But then the rest was going to be for her to do. We connected in that moment on an unspoken level, where she knew I saw that flame in her, and understood it, and was willing not to suffocate it but to protect it."

Moore and Freundlich married on August 23, 2003. The couple have a son and a daughter. Moore has appeared in all of Freundlich's feature films with the exception of Catch That Kid (2004), The Rebound (2009), and Wolves (2016).

== Filmography ==
Short films

- A Dog Race in Alaska (1993)
- Hired Hands (1994)

Feature films

- The Myth of Fingerprints (1997)
- World Traveler (2001)
- Catch That Kid (2004)
- Trust the Man (2005)
- The Rebound (2009)
- Wolves (2016)
- After the Wedding (2019)
- With/In: Volume 1 (2021)

Television

- Californication (2007–2012, 8 episodes)
- Prime Suspect (2012, 1 episode)
- Mozart in the Jungle (2014, 2 episodes)
- Believe (2014, 1 episode)
- Little Voice (2020, 1 episode)
