= Green Bank (film) =

- Directed by: Josh Ruben
- Written by: Aaron Horwitz
- Produced by: Andy Horwitz; Jack Greenberg; Josh Ruben
- Starring: Brittany O'Grady; Tatiana Maslany; Jasmin Savoy Brown; Kumail Nanjiani; Jim Belushi; Taylor John Smith
- Cinematography: Magdalena Górka
- Production companies: Big Swell Entertainment; Pangaea Studios; Nocturnal Kid
- Country: United States
- Language: English

Green Bank is an upcoming American science fiction horror thriller film directed by Josh Ruben and written by Aaron Horwitz. It stars Brittany O'Grady, Tatiana Maslany, Jasmin Savoy Brown, Kumail Nanjiani, Jim Belushi, and Taylor John Smith.

== Cast ==
- Brittany O'Grady
- Tatiana Maslany
- Jasmin Savoy Brown
- Kumail Nanjiani
- Jim Belushi
- Taylor John Smith

== Production ==
In February 2023, it was reported that Josh Ruben would be directing a science fiction horror thriller film titled Green Bank, starring Tatiana Maslany and Jasmin Savoy Brown. In April 2026, Brittany O'Grady, Kumail Nanjiani, Jim Belushi, and Taylor John Smith joined the cast, with O'Grady playing the lead role. Principal photography began on April 21, 2026, at the Pangaea Studios in Atlanta, and wrapped on May 28.
