= The Brass Teapot =

- Theatrical release poster
- Directed by: Ramaa Mosley
- Written by: Tim Macy
- Starring: Juno Temple; Michael Angarano; Alexis Bledel; Alia Shawkat; Bobby Moynihan
- Cinematography: Piotr Simonitski
- Edited by: Ryan Folsey
- Music by: Andrew Hewitt
- Distributed by: Magnolia Pictures
- Release dates: September 8, 2012 (Toronto International Film Festival); April 5, 2013 (United States)
- Running time: 101 minutes
- Country: United States
- Language: English
- Box office: $413,733

The Brass Teapot is a 2012 American fantasy comedy film directed by Ramaa Mosley. The movie's script was written by Tim Macy, who also wrote the short story on which the movie is based. The movie premiered at the Toronto International Film Festival on September 8, 2012, and was released into theaters and video on demand on April 5, 2013. Development of a stage musical version, with book by Mosley and Macy and music by Chaz Cardigan, began in 2019 with producer and co-conceiver Erik Kaiko. The musical had a reading in New York City as part of the 2024 National Alliance for Musical Theatre Festival.

== Synopsis ==
John and Alice are a down-on-their-luck couple who come across a magical brass teapot capable of providing them with money. The only catch is that they must experience pain in order for the teapot to provide. They must then decide what they are willing to do (and what they are willing to suffer through) in order to gain financial security.

== Cast ==
- Juno Temple as Alice
- Michael Angarano as John
- Alexis Bledel as Payton
- Alia Shawkat as Louise
- Bobby Moynihan as Chuck
- Ben Rappaport as Ricky
- Billy Magnussen as Arnie
- Steve Park as Dr. Li Ling
- Lucy Walters as Mary
- Claudia Mason as Donna
- Debra Monk as Trudy
- Thomas Middleditch as Habab
- Cristin Milioti as Brandi
- Nick Frazier as Wedding Bartender

== Reception ==
The Brass Teapot garnered negative reviews from critics. It holds a 29% approval rating on Rotten Tomatoes, based on 31 reviews, with an average rating of 4.7/10. The Film.com review said: "Despite the sometimes patchy moments The Brass Teapot by and large squeaks by as an enjoyable entertainment." The Playlist commented that: "With the help of a talented cast, The Brass Teapot is able to coast on charm."

HitFix writes: "It is apparent that Ramaa Mosley has a voice, and that The Brass Teapot is a focused, controlled piece of storytelling that displays real control". The Wall Street Journal said: "Alice and John are good company — especially Alice, thanks to Ms. Temple's buoyant humor and lovely poignancy. The problem comes when the couple gets greedy, the gods grow angry and the tone turns dark. It doesn't stay dark, but getting back to the brightness is a painful process."

Nicolas Rapold of The New York Times criticized the film, saying that while the two lead characters were interesting, the "movie's best bits lose out to the requisite moral turnaround". Rob Hunter of Film School Rejects commented that the darker points of the film's story line were "ill fitting" in contrast with the predominantly "comically light and slapsticky" tone of the overall movie. In contrast, Peter Debruge of Variety gave a more positive review for the film, saying that Mosely "makes her low-budget enterprise look as slick as most midrange studio comedies, demonstrating herself a director with both imagination and technical ingenuity."

== Musical Adaptation ==
In 2019, the dramatic stage rights for the film were optioned by Brass Teapot Development LLC / producer Erik Kaiko, who had seen the film years prior. Mosley and Macy wrote a first draft of the script adaptation, and the first draft of the score was completed by Cardigan in 2021.

Following an informal 2021 Zoom reading and a writing retreat in 2022, major structural changes were implemented, and further improvements were made. The piece was named a semi-finalist for the Eugene O'Neill Theater Center’s 2023 National Music Theater Conference, as well as the American Music Theatre Project at Northwestern University. The third complete draft was accepted into the 2024 Chicago Musical Theatre Festival, produced by Kokandy Productions at Steppenwolf Theatre Company, and NAMT's 36th Annual Festival of New Musicals in 2024.

A developmental production was staged by Los Angeles theatre company Firefly Theatre Group in May 2025.
