= Almost Friends (2016 film) =

2016 comedy-drama film directed by Jake Goldberger

- Theatrical release poster
- Directed by: Jake Goldberger
- Written by: Jake Goldberger
- Produced by: Alex A. Ginzburg; Tony Lee; Jim Young
- Starring: Freddie Highmore; Odeya Rush; Haley Joel Osment; Jake Abel; Rita Volk; Taylor John Smith; Marg Helgenberger; Christopher Meloni; Gary Ray Moore
- Cinematography: Jeremy Mackie
- Edited by: Julie Garces
- Music by: Eric V. Hachikian
- Production companies: Let It Play; Animus Films
- Distributed by: Gravitas Ventures; Orion Pictures
- Release dates: October 14, 2016 (Austin); November 17, 2017 (United States)
- Running time: 105 minutes
- Country: United States
- Language: English
- Box office: $46,376

Almost Friends is a 2016 American comedy-drama film written and directed by Jake Goldberger. The film stars Freddie Highmore, Odeya Rush, Haley Joel Osment, Christopher Meloni, and Marg Helgenberger.

College drop out Charlie, who moved back home, is struggling to discover who he really is as he deals with an irresponsible father and has a crush on Amber, a young woman who already has a boyfriend and is soon leaving for college.

The film premiered on October 14, 2016, at the Austin Film Festival. It was released in North America on November 17, 2017, by Gravitas Ventures and Orion Pictures.

== Plot ==
Charlie Brenner is a seemingly unmotivated young man who has returned home after dropping out of college. Living with his mother, stepfather Ross and brother Steven, he works as the assistant manager at a small movie theatre and lives vicariously through his best friend Ben.

Charlie's life takes an unpredictable turn, however, when he finds himself falling for local coffee shop barista Amber. His friend Heather picks him up in the evening, and tries to convince him to join an upcoming party with their old high school classmates.

Amber is dissatisfied with her life. Living with her mooching cousin Jack, with a long-time, track star boyfriend Brad, she has steadfast plans to go to NYU in New York City in the fall.

Charlie and Heather head to the party. Sharing the elevator on the way up with Amber and Brad, Heather loudly outs Charlie about his inability to ask out the barista he is almost stalking. Amber later approaches Charlie, but they talk only briefly before Brad convinces her to leave.

Then, Charlie's estranged father Howard unexpectedly re-enters his life, convincing him to let him stay. Against his mother's protests, Charlie lets Howard sleep in his room.

Although initially brushing Charlie off when he stops by the café, Amber later suggests he walk with her the next day. They get to know each other, and he finds out she lives with Jack as her parents moved to Florida, and she wanted to finish her senior year here. And she has been with Brad through most of high school.

Charlie gives Amber his number, so she ends up calling. Not wanting to be alone, as she has just found out she is pregnant, she goes to his house for dinner. There Amber learns of Charlie's initial success with cooking, then his father and Ross end up arguing. After Charlie and Steven play around, she inexplicably gets upset.

Amber and Charlie go outside, and she tells him about taking a pregnancy test, although she lies about the result. She says it made her feel like her whole life flashed before her eyes.

At a party for Ben, Charlie is forced to use the ladies' room, where he overhears Amber telling her friend that she sees him as lost and could never see herself with him. Upset, he leaves the party.

Days pass and, as Amber has not heard from Charlie for a while, she shows up at his house. He reveals he had overheard her telling her friend about him negatively. Amber apologises and they suddenly start making out. Charlie's father interrupts, so they go out to Steven's playhouse. Charlie explains that a traumatic traffic accident he was involved in threw him off course after his junior year.

After Amber tells Charlie they can no longer be friends, he and Steven get lured out of the house by Howard, who clears the house of its furniture. Fired up with frustration, Charlie approaches Brad after track practice and challenges him to race. Brad unexpectedly doubles over in pain, as his leg is damaged.

Charlie ends up seeing Amber in the hospital, and explains he was being aggressive with Brad. Soon afterwards, Brad confronts her about Charlie and they break up.

In the meantime, Charlie drives down to a hotel in New Orleans his father had mentioned. Discovering most of the stolen furniture is in storage, Charlie gets the police involved, so it is returned to his mother's. While there, Howard tells him two secrets he had unearthed: Amber's abortion and Ben's passed bar confirmation.

Returning home, Charlie finally finds the path forward. He contacts a NYC chef who had once shown an interest, getting an assistant chef position, then moves with Ben to the city as he finally knows who he wants to be.

== Cast ==
- Freddie Highmore as Charlie Brenner
- Odeya Rush as Amber
- Haley Joel Osment as Ben
- Christopher Meloni as Howard
- Marg Helgenberger as Samantha
- Rita Volk as Heather
- Jake Abel as Jack
- Taylor John Smith as Brad
- Lonnie Knight as Homeless Man
- Gary Ray Moore as Ross
- Jon Hayden as Russel

== Production ==
On August 18, 2015, it was announced that the production on comedy-drama film Holding Patterns was underway, starring Freddie Highmore, Odeya Rush, Haley Joel Osment, Rita Volk, Jake Abel, and Taylor John Smith. Jake Goldberger was directing the film from his own screenplay, while Alex Ginzburg and Tony Lee would be producing the film through Let It Play, with Jim Young producing through Animus Films. On August 26, 2015, Christopher Meloni and Marg Helgenberger joined the film's cast to play Howard and Samantha, respectively, and Gary Ray Moore also joined the cast.

Principal photography began in Mobile, Alabama on July 27, 2015. Highmore and Volk were spotted shooting on location at Spanish Fort High School the following day.

== Release ==
In October 2017, Gravitas Ventures and Orion Pictures acquired distribution rights to the film, and set it for a November 17, 2017, release.

== Reception ==
=== Box office ===
Almost Friends has grossed a total worldwide of $46,376, and sales of its DVD/Blu-ray releases have cashed $16,355.

=== Critical response ===
On Rotten Tomatoes, Almost Friends has an approval rating of 29% based on seven reviews, with an average rating of 5.1/10.

In a positive review, Marjorie Baumgarten of the Austin Chronicle wrote, "[The film] has an easygoing charm that should earn it a solid place among the subset of movies about young people who emerge from their small-town cocoons and screw up their courage to take flight for the bright lights of New York City." Sheri Linden of The Hollywood Reporter described it less favorably as "a comic drama that's sometimes appealingly gentle but more often frustratingly amorphous" with "instances of wit and sensitivity scattered through the screenplay, but they have no cumulative impact amid the lackluster direction and general dearth of urgency." Upon the film's theatrical release, Katie Walsh of the Los Angeles Times called the film's premise of Highmore's character, Charlie, tenuously pursuing a relationship with Rush's Amber despite her existing relationship, "painfully tone-deaf" in light of the onset of Me Too movement, suggesting it "feels like a relic of a bygone era, when movies could casually present stalking and coercion as acceptable forms of courtship."
