= Fury (2014 film) =

2014 film by David Ayer

- Theatrical release poster
- Directed by: David Ayer
- Written by: David Ayer
- Produced by: Bill Block; David Ayer; Ethan Smith; John Lesher
- Starring: Brad Pitt; Shia LaBeouf; Logan Lerman; Michael Peña; Jon Bernthal; Jason Isaacs
- Cinematography: Roman Vasyanov
- Edited by: Dody Dorn; Jay Cassidy
- Music by: Steven Price
- Production companies: Columbia Pictures; QED International; LStar Capital; Le Grisbi Productions; Crave Films
- Distributed by: Sony Pictures Releasing
- Release dates: October 15, 2014 (Newseum); October 17, 2014 (United States)
- Running time: 135 minutes
- Country: United States
- Language: English
- Budget: $68–80 million
- Box office: $211.8 million

Fury is an American war film written, directed, and co-produced by David Ayer. It stars Brad Pitt with Shia LaBeouf, Logan Lerman, Michael Peña, and Jon Bernthal as members of an American tank crew fighting in Nazi Germany during the final weeks of the European theater of World War II. Ayer was influenced by the service of military veterans in his family and by reading books such as Belton Y. Cooper's Death Traps, a 1998 memoir that underscores the high casualty rates suffered by American tank crews in combat against their better-equipped German counterparts.

Production began in England in early September 2013. Initial filming in Hertfordshire led to the start of principal photography in Oxfordshire on September 30, 2013. Filming continued in the city of Oxford and elsewhere and concluded on November 13, 2013. Fury was released on October 17, 2014 by Sony Pictures Releasing through its Columbia Pictures label, receiving generally positive reviews and grossing over $211 million worldwide.

== Plot ==
In April 1945, during the Western Allied invasion of Germany, Don "Wardaddy" Collier, a battle-hardened US Army first sergeant in the Second Armored Division, commands an M4A3E8 Sherman tank nicknamed Fury, whose crew—consisting of gunner Boyd "Bible" Swan, loader Grady "Coon-Ass" Travis, driver Trini "Gordo" Garcia, and assistant driver–bow gunner "Red"—has been together since the North African campaign. After Red is killed in action, he is replaced by private first class Norman Ellison, formerly a typist clerk.

The crew disdains Norman for his lack of combat experience and aversion to violence. As their tank column advances, Norman spots but does not fire on concealed Hitler Youth, who ambush and destroy the lead tank with a Panzerfaust, killing the platoon leader and his crew. Don furiously blames Norman for their loss and assumes command of the column.

Norman hesitates again during an assault on a tree line against infantry and anti-tank guns. After the battle, Don orders Norman to execute a captured German soldier. When he refuses, Don wrestles his revolver into Norman's hand and forces him to pull the trigger, killing the soldier and traumatizing Norman.

After capturing Kirchohsen, Don and Norman find two German cousins, Irma and Emma, hiding in an apartment. Don has the women cook for them. Seeing Norman connecting with Emma, Don coerces them to have sex. Afterwards, Fury's drunken crew enters. Grady repeatedly harasses Emma and bullies Norman until Don physically berates him, before the unit is ordered to move out. While Captain Waggoner briefs Don on their next mission, German artillery strikes the town, killing Emma.

Don's platoon is ordered to seize and hold a vital crossroads to protect the division's vulnerable rear. A lone German Tiger I ambushes and destroys the other three tanks before being defeated by Fury, which loses its radio in the battle. Unable to call for reinforcements, Don decides to continue the mission alone. Fury is immobilized by a landmine at the crossroads. Norman is sent to scout and spots a Waffen-SS battalion approaching. The crew opts to leave until Don insists on staying with the immobilized tank. Norman elects to stay and the others decide to do the same.

The men disguise Fury to appear knocked out and assume their positions to make a last stand. Exchanging Bible verses, Norman earns the nickname "Machine" as a show of the crew's newfound support. Fury ambushes the Waffen-SS battalion, inflicting heavy casualties. During the skirmish, Grady is killed by a Panzerfaust shot that penetrates the turret. After the tank's gun runs out of ammo, the rest of the crew engages the battalion with hand weapons, and the tank's 50 cal gun. Gordo is shot, dropping a live grenade inside the tank, then sacrifices himself by shielding it with his body. A sniper kills Bible, and wounds Don. Out of ammunition and surrounded, Norman contemplates surrendering, but Don directs him to escape through the floor hatch as the Germans drop stick grenades into the tank. Norman hides underneath the tank as the grenades kill Don, and is then spared by a young Waffen-SS soldier who spots him under the tank but chooses not to alert his comrades.

Norman crawls back into the tank the next morning and covers Don's corpse with his jacket before being discovered by US infantry reinforcements. He is helped to an ambulance and praised as a hero, as an American column advances past Fury's wreck, surrounded by dozens of dead Waffen-SS soldiers.

== Cast ==
- Brad Pitt as Don "Wardaddy" Collier (tank commander)
- Shia LaBeouf as Boyd "Bible" Swan (tank gunner)
- Logan Lerman as Norman "Machine" Ellison (tank assistant driver/bow gunner)
- Michael Peña as Trini "Gordo" Garcia (tank driver)
- Jon Bernthal as Grady "Coon-Ass" Travis (tank loader)
- Jason Isaacs as Captain Waggoner
- Brad Henke as Sergeant Davis
- Jim Parrack as Sergeant Binkowski
- Xavier Samuel as Lieutenant Parker
- Scott Eastwood as Sergeant Miles
- Kevin Vance as Sergeant Peterson
- Anamaria Marinca as Irma
- Alicia von Rittberg as Emma

== Production ==
=== Casting ===
On April 3, 2013, Sony started assembling the cast for the film when Brad Pitt, who previously starred in the WWII film Inglourious Basterds (2009), entered final talks to take the lead role of Wardaddy. On April 23, Shia LaBeouf joined the cast. On May 1, it was announced that Logan Lerman had also joined Fury's cast, playing Pitt's crew member Norman Ellison. On May 14, The Hollywood Reporter announced that Michael Peña was in negotiations to play a member of Pitt's tank crew; ultimately joining the cast. On May 17, Jon Bernthal joined the cast as Grady Travis, a cunning, vicious, and world-wise Arkansas native. On August 26, Scott Eastwood also joined the cast, playing Sergeant Miles. On September 19, Brad William Henke joined as Sergeant Roy Davis, commander of another tank, Lucy Sue (the third Sherman destroyed by the Tiger). Jason Isaacs was cast on October 7, 2013. Other cast members include Xavier Samuel, Jim Parrack, Eugenia Kuzmina, Kevin Vance, and Branko Tomović.

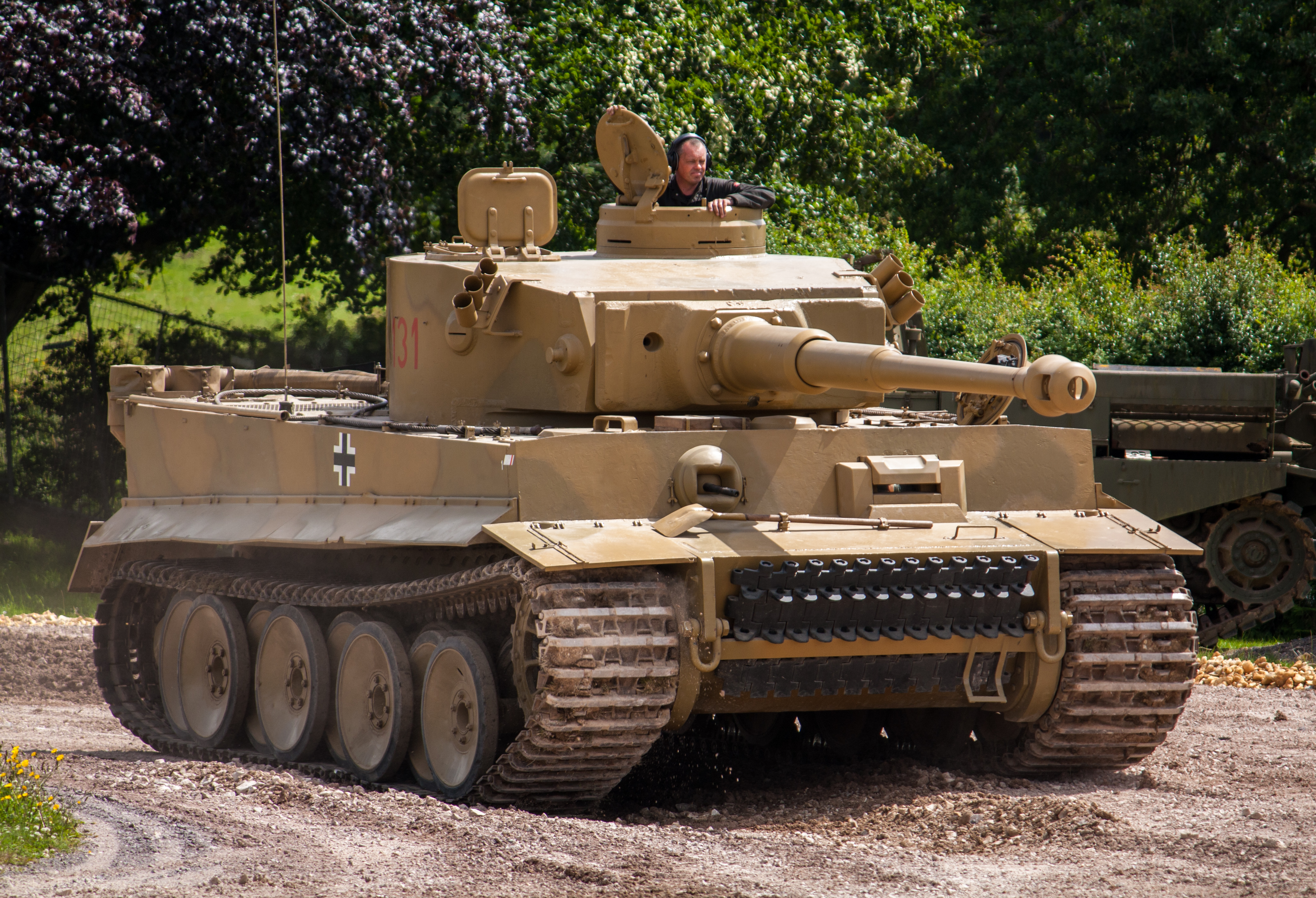
Tiger 131 – the only operating Tiger I tank in the world – was lent by The Tank Museum for the film. It is the first time a genuine Tiger I tank was used in a contemporary war film since 1950; 131 was restored to running condition between 1990 and 2003, and further work was only completed in 2012.

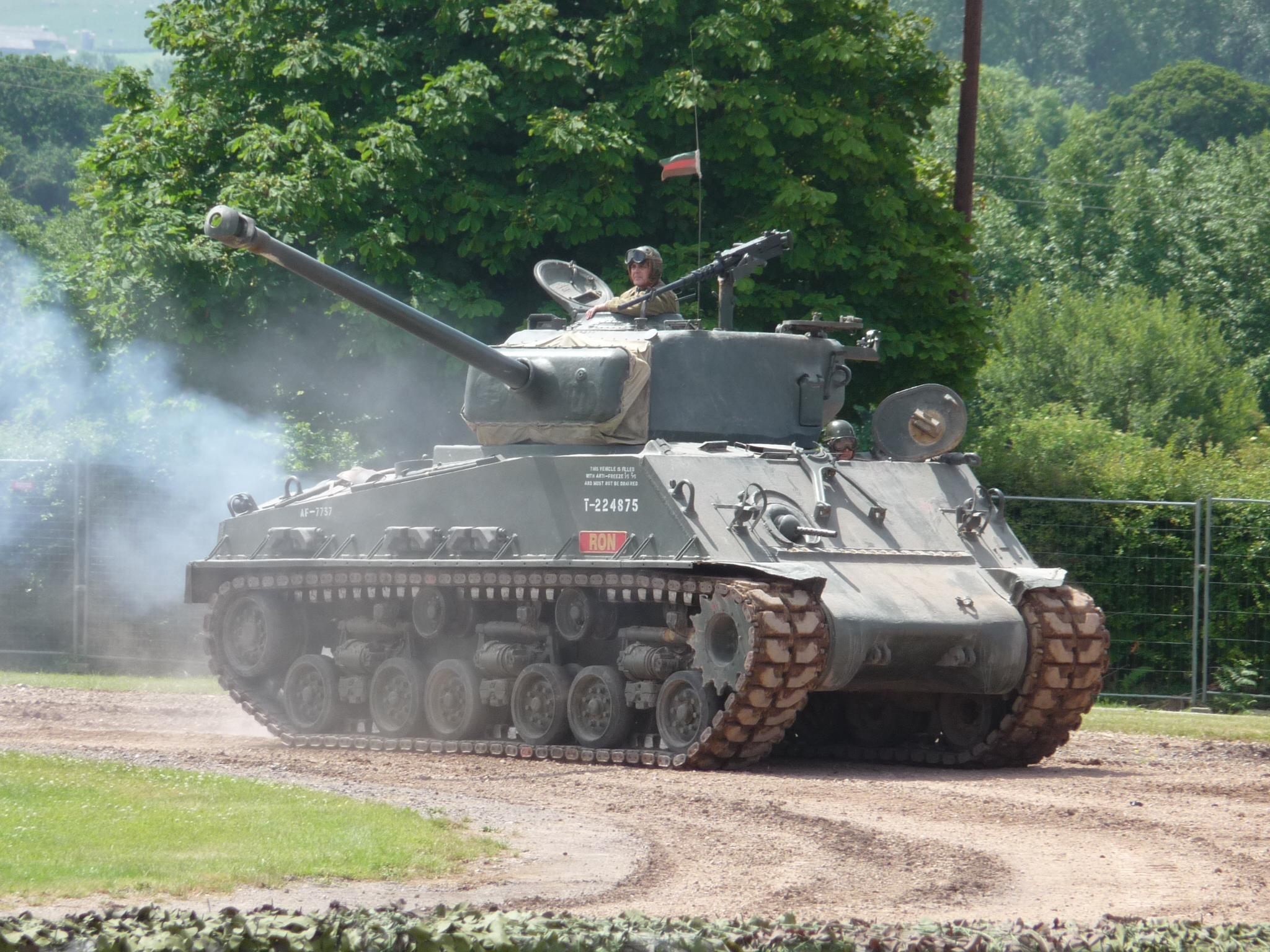
The Tank Museum's M4A2 76mm HVSS Sherman in 2009

=== Preparation ===
Ayer required the actors to undergo four months of preparation for filming, including a week-long boot camp run by Navy SEALs. Pitt said, "It was set up to break us down, to keep us cold, to keep us exhausted, to make us miserable, to keep us wet, make us eat cold food. And if our stuff wasn't together we had to pay for it with physical forfeits. We're up at five in the morning, we're doing night watches on the hour."

Ayer also pushed the cast to physically spar each other, leading to black eyes and bloody noses. They insulted each other with personal attacks as well. On top of that, the actors were forced to live in the tank together for an extended period of time where they ate, slept, and defecated.

Ayer said, "I am ruthless as a director. I will do whatever I think is necessary to get what I want."

=== Filming ===
The film's crews were rehearsing the film scenes in Hertfordshire in September 2013. The crew were also sighted filming in various locations in North West England. Pitt was spotted in preparations for Fury driving a tank on September 3 in the English countryside. Principal photography began on September 30, 2013, in the Oxfordshire countryside. Pinewood Studios sent warning letters to the villagers of Shirburn, Pyrton, and Watlington that there would be sounds of gunfire and explosions during the filming of Fury.

On October 15, 2013, a stuntman was accidentally stabbed in the shoulder with a bayonet while rehearsing at the set in Pyrton. He was taken to the John Radcliffe Hospital in Oxford by air ambulance; police treated it as an accident. In November 2013, the film caused controversy by shooting a scene on Remembrance Day in which extras wore Wehrmacht and Waffen-SS uniforms; Ayer and Sony apologized.

=== Music ===
On November 19, 2013, composer Steven Price signed on to score the film. Varèse Sarabande released the original soundtrack album for the film on October 14, 2014.

== Portrayal of history ==
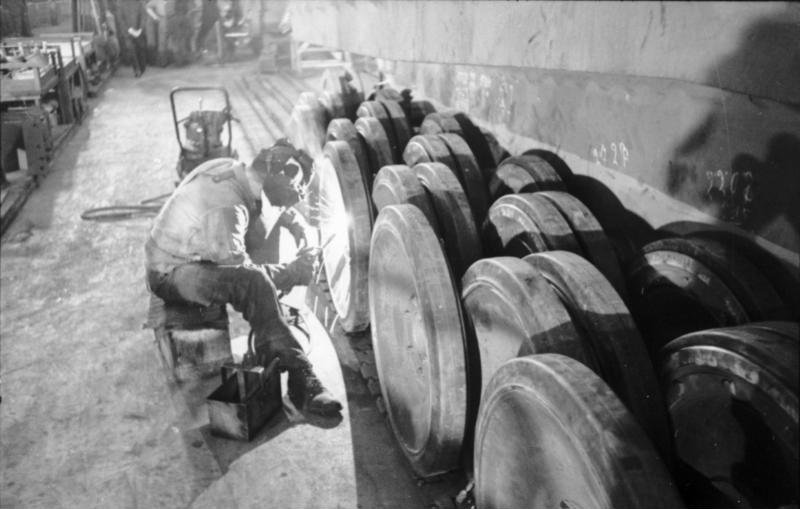
The Schachtellaufwerk wheel arrangement on a Tiger I, which is identical to that on the Tiger 131 used for the movie

Ayer sought authentic uniforms and weapons appropriate to the period of the final months of the war in Europe. The film was shot in the United Kingdom, partly due to the availability of working World War II-era tanks. The film features Tiger 131, the last surviving operational Tiger I, owned by The Tank Museum at Bovington, England. Ten working M4 Sherman tanks were also used. The Sherman tank Fury was portrayed using an M4A2 (76) W HVSS Sherman tank named RON/HARRY (T224875), also lent by The Tank Museum.

Map of Hannover, Germany used in the film

Ayer's attention to detail extended to the maps used in the film. A 1943 wartime map of Hannover, Germany, held in McMaster University's Lloyd Reeds Map Collection, was used to demonstrate the types of resources relied on by Allied forces. The film's depiction of tank warfare and soldier comradery was generally well received by World War II veterans.

== Release ==
Sony Pictures Releasing had previously set November 14, 2014, as the American release date for Fury. On August 12, 2014, the date was moved up from its original release date of November 14, 2014, to October 17, 2014. The film premiered in London, UK on October 20, 2014, as a closing film of London Film Festival and was theatrically released in the United Kingdom on October 22, 2014.

Fury had its world premiere at Newseum in Washington, D.C., on October 15, 2014, followed by a wide release across 3,173 theaters in North America on October 17.

=== Home media ===
The film was released on DVD and Blu-ray in the United States on January 27, 2015. It was released on Ultra HD Blu-ray on May 22, 2018.

=== Partnership with World of Tanks ===
The film additionally had a partnership with the video game World of Tanks, where the main tank from the film, Fury, was available for purchase in-game using real currency for a limited time after the film's release. The tank also served as the centerpiece in themed events in the vein of the film following its release. The Blitz version has been widely criticized due to the lack of attention to detail on the in game Fury Model.

As part of the UK DVD release, the game also hid 300,000 codes inside copies of the film, which gave in-game rewards and bonuses.

=== Piracy ===
The film was leaked onto peer-to-peer file-sharing websites as part of the Sony Pictures hack by the hacker group "Guardians of Peace" on November 27, 2014. Along with it came four unreleased Sony Pictures films (Annie, Mr. Turner, Still Alice, and To Write Love on Her Arms). Within three days of the initial leak, Fury had been downloaded an estimated 1.2 million times.

== Reception ==
=== Box office ===
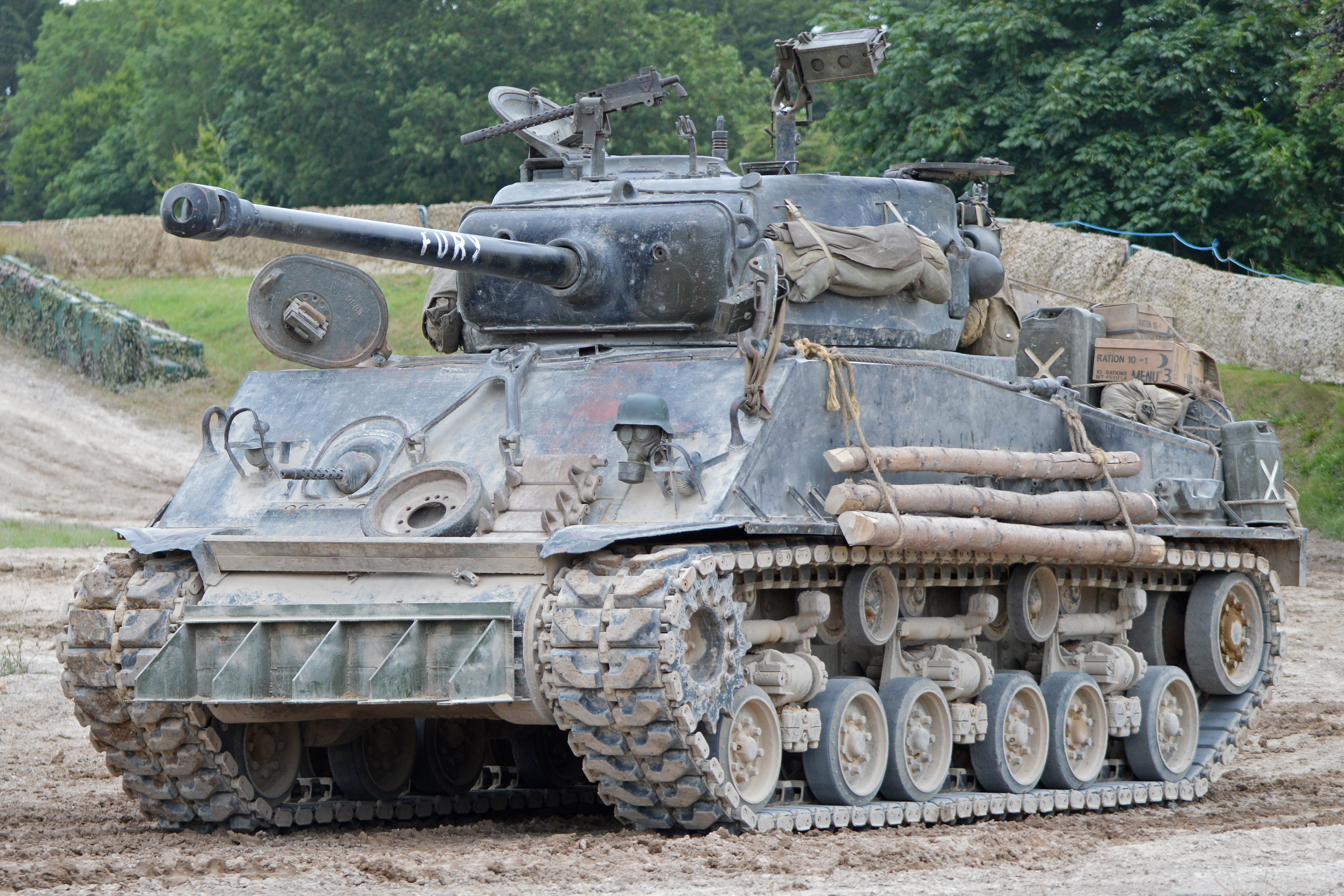
The Tank Museum's M4A2 76mm HVSS Sherman made up as Fury

Fury grossed $85.8 million in the United States and Canada, and $126 million in other countries, for a worldwide total of $211.8 million, against a budget of $68 million.

==== US and Canada ====
Fury was released in the United States and Canada in 3,173 theaters, and earned $1.2 million from Thursday night previews at 2,489 theaters. On its opening day, the film grossed $8.8 million. It went on to top the box office with $23.5 million, an average of $7,406 per theater. The film's opening weekend gross was David Ayer's biggest hit of his directorial career, surpassing the $13.1 million debut of End of Watch. In its second weekend the film earned $13 million (dropping 45%).

==== Other countries ====
Fury was released a week following its North American debut and earned $11.2 million from 1,975 screens in 15 markets. The film went number one in Australia ($2.2 million) and number five in France ($2.1 million). In UK, the film topped the box office in its opening weekend with £2.69 million ($4.2 million) knocking off Teenage Mutant Ninja Turtles which earned £1.92 million ($3.1 million) from the top spot. In its second weekend the film added $14.6 million in 44 markets, bringing the overseas cumulative audience [cume] to $37.8 million. It went to number one in Finland ($410,000) and in Ukraine ($420,000).

=== Critical response ===
On Rotten Tomatoes, the film has an approval rating of 75% based on 261 reviews, with an average rating of 6.9/10. The website's critical consensus reads, "Overall, Fury is a well-acted, suitably raw depiction of the horrors of war that offers visceral battle scenes but doesn't quite live up to its larger ambitions." On Metacritic, the film has a score of 64 out of 100, based on 47 critics, indicating "generally favorable" reviews. Audiences surveyed by CinemaScore gave the film an average grade of "A−" on an A+ to F scale. The opening weekend audience was 60% male, with 51 percent over the age of 35.

Mick LaSalle of the San Francisco Chronicle gave a four out of four rating and wrote: "A great movie lets you know you're in safe hands from the beginning." The New York Times' critic A. O. Scott praised the film and Pitt's character, "Within this gore-spattered, superficially nihilistic carapace is an old-fashioned platoon picture, a sensitive and superbly acted tale of male bonding under duress." James Berardinelli also gave a positive review saying: "This is a memorable motion picture, accurately depicting the horrors of war without reveling in the depravity of man (like Platoon). Equally, it shows instances of humanity without resorting to the rah-rah, sanitized perspective that infiltrated many war films of the 1950s and 1960s. It's as good a World War II film as I've seen in recent years, and contains perhaps the most draining battlefield sequences since Saving Private Ryan." Kenneth Turan for the Los Angeles Times praised the film highly, writing: The "best job I ever had" sentence "is one of the catchphrases the men in this killing machine use with each other, and the ghastly thing is they half believe it's true."

Peter Debruge said in Variety, "Brad Pitt plays a watered-down version of his Inglourious Basterds character in this disappointingly bland look at a World War II tank crew." New York magazine's David Edelstein said, "Though much of Fury crumbles in the mind, the power of its best moments lingers: the writhing of Ellison as he's forced to kill; the frightening vibe of the scene with German women; the meanness on some soldiers' faces and soul-sickness on others'."

=== Accolades ===
List of awards and nominations
Award / Film Festival	Category	Recipients	Result
Critics' Choice Awards	Best Action Movie		Nominated
Critics' Choice Awards	Best Actor in an Action Movie	Brad Pitt	Nominated
Hollywood Film Awards	Hollywood Editing Award	Jay Cassidy and Dody Dorn	Won
Hollywood Music in Media Awards	Original Score Feature Film	Steven Price	Nominated
Motion Picture Sound Editors	Feature English Language – Effects / Foley		Nominated
National Board of Review	Top Ten Films		Won
National Board of Review	Best Cast		Won
People's Choice Awards	Favorite Movie Actor	Brad Pitt	Nominated
People's Choice Awards	Favorite Movie Dramatic Actor	Brad Pitt	Nominated
Phoenix Film Critics Society	Best Actor in a Supporting Role	Logan Lerman	Nominated
Screen Actors Guild	Outstanding Performance by a Stunt Ensemble in a Motion Picture		Nominated
Satellite Awards	Best Art Direction & Production Design	Andrew Mendez, Peter Russell	Nominated
Satellite Awards	Best Editing	Dody Dorn, Jay Cassidy	Nominated
Satellite Awards	Best Original Score	Steven Price	Nominated
Santa Barbara International Film Festival	Virtuosos Award	Logan Lerman	Won
Teen Choice Awards	Choice Movie: Drama		Nominated
Teen Choice Awards	Choice Movie Actor: Drama	Logan Lerman	Nominated

== Bibliography ==
- Jacob, Frank (October 24, 2014). "Hollywood's Image of the Second World War—David Ayer's Fury (2014) and the Depiction of Violence in War". Academia.edu.
