= Lucky Strike (2026 film) =

2026 war film by Rod Lurie

- Theatrical release poster
- Directed by: Rod Davis Lurie
- Written by: Marc Frydman; Rod Davis Lurie
- Produced by: Marc Frydman; Rod Davis Lurie; Jonathan Yunger; Les Weldon; Yariv Lerner
- Starring: Scott Eastwood; Colin Hanks; Aunjanue Ellis-Taylor; Taylor John Smith
- Cinematography: Lorenzo Senatore
- Edited by: Christal Khatib
- Music by: Larry Groupé; Rod Davis Lurie
- Production company: Perfection Hunter Millennium Media
- Distributed by: Roadside Attractions; Saban Films
- Release date: June 26, 2026
- Running time: 104 minutes
- Country: United States
- Language: English
- Budget: $10 million
- Box office: $1.6 million

Lucky Strike is a 2026 American war action thriller film directed by Rod Lurie, co-written by Lurie and Marc Frydman, and starring Scott Eastwood, Colin Hanks, Aunjanue Ellis-Taylor, and Taylor John Smith. The plot follows an American soldier who becomes trapped behind enemy lines during the Battle of the Bulge, and attempts to make his way back to friendly forces while only armed with his Motorola SCR-300 radio.

The film was theatrically released in the United States on June 26, 2026, by Roadside Attractions and Saban Films, to mixed reviews from critics.

== Plot ==
In December 1944, during the Battle of the Bulge of World War II, US Captain John Castle, 324th Engineering Battalion of Charlie Company, and his men (minus one named Cash, who is compelled to resign due to combat injuries) are sent to block off a vital road to stop the 1st SS Panzer Division from capturing American fuel depots while the rest of the Company pulls out. While setting up explosive charges, the squad is eradicated by a machine gun nest and a passing SS half-track crew, with a wounded Castle as the sole survivor.

After fulfilling his objective, Castle is forced to return to friendly lines at Elsenborn on foot, carrying a field radio nicknamed "Lassie" and a pack of Lucky Strike cigarettes, constantly hiding from SS units roving the countryside and killing those who chance upon him. After barely escaping an artillery barrage, he meets one Sgt. Bellingham, who claims he's been transporting secret battle plans to the headquarters of the 99th Infantry Division. Making camp for the night, they establish radio contact with the 324th, who promise to send a transport to pick them up. Afterwards, however, Castle notices that Bellingham was not smoking the Lucky Strike cigarette that Castle has shared with him in the same way an American would. His suspicions aroused, Castle gives Bellingham a Signal Operation Instructions (SOI) code transmission he has noted down; when Bellingham proves unable to decipher it, Castle unmasks him as a German posing as an American. A gunfight ensues, during which Castle, although wounded, successfully kills Bellingham before losing consciousness .

When Castle wakes again, he finds himself transported to a US field hospital at Elsenborn. There he meets General Lauer, the commander of the 99th, who informs Castle that his actions during his return journey have confused the SS, stalling their attacks on the American positions for several hours and thus granting the US troops precious time to organize their defenses, and preventing them from locating and targeting Lauer. Despite Castle's protestations because he feels guilty over the loss of his men, Lauer puts him down for a Silver Star. While recuperating, Castle re-encounters Cash, who restores his confidence and gifts him his hip flask.

After the war, Castle, now a colonel, visits Rose Caldwell, the factory worker who assembled "Lassie", to share his story with her and give her a pension blackmailed from her former employers after they had refused to pay her off, as a sign of gratitude for the fact that "Lassie" has kept him alive during his perilous trek. Later, after returning to his family, he is seen taking a fond glance at "Lassie", which he retained as a keepsake.

== Cast ==
- Scott Eastwood as Captain John Castle
- Colin Hanks as Colonel Neale
- Aunjanue Ellis-Taylor as Rose Caldwell
- Henry Hughes as Dauntless
- Taylor John Smith as Sergeant Bellingham
- Kwame Patterson as Maren
- Jonathan Yunger as Cash
- Jariko Denman as Top
- Scott Alda Coffey as Averil
- Alfie Stewart as Miller
- Jake Lowe as Murphy
- Alexandra Vale as Rebecca Castle
- Ori Pfeffer as Capt. Joachim
- Boyan Arsov as Kemp
- Atanas Srebrev as General Lauer
- Lorne MacFadyen as Barrett
- Caroline Piette as Juliette
- Hazel Rogers as Nicole

== Production ==
The film was based on an event in Marc Frydman's life, when, as a 16 year-old in France, he interviewed a veteran of the Battle of the Bulge for a school project, eventually developing the concept as a screenplay. The script was rewritten several times over the next 50 years before it was filmed. Rod Lurie cited films such as The Guns of Navarone, Where Eagles Dare, Von Ryan's Express and The Great Escape as influences, stating that World War II films "obviously dealt with a very serious event in world history, but you could be entertained as you're watching it as well", mentioning the audiences lack of sympathy towards Nazi antagonists.

Scott Eastwood, Colin Hanks, Aunjanue Ellis-Taylor, and Taylor John Smith were cast in the lead roles. Principal photography took place in late 2024 at Nu Boyana Film Studios in Bulgaria. The opening scene was converted to black-and-white after filming, which Lurie felt would reflect public perception of how the war is remembered. BondIt Media Capital provided financing.

== Release ==
Millennium Media handled the US sales for the film. In March 2026, Roadside Attractions and Saban Films acquired North American distribution rights to the film, scheduling it for a theatrical release in the United States on June 26, 2026.

== Critical reception ==
On the review aggregator website Rotten Tomatoes, 65% of 48 critics' reviews are positive, with an average rating of 6.1/10. The website's consensus reads: "Presenting a straightforward tale of survival with solid suspense, Lucky Strike is a respectable tribute to wartime heroism that otherwise lacks the spark to stand out amid the crowded WWII genre." Metacritic, which uses a weighted average, assigned the film a score of 50 out of 100, based on nine critics, indicating "mixed or average" reviews.

Nicolas Rapold of The New York Times wrote, "This World War II movie is a nuts-and-bolts survival thriller that recalls a bygone era of Greatest Generation patriotism."

Frank Scheck of The Hollywood Reporter wrote, "Lucky Strike ultimately emerges as less than the sum of its more powerful parts, failing to sustain tension and suffering from such forced would-be poetical moments as Castle encountering a beautiful white horse standing alone in a wintry landscape. And the dialogue is frequently ham-fisted".
