= Wolves (2016 film) =

- Theatrical release poster
- Directed by: Bart Freundlich
- Written by: Bart Freundlich
- Produced by: Tim Perell; Erica Steinberg
- Starring: Michael Shannon; Carla Gugino; Taylor John Smith; Chris Bauer; John Douglas Thompson
- Cinematography: Juan Miguel Azpiroz
- Edited by: Joseph Krings
- Music by: David Bridie
- Production company: Process Media
- Distributed by: IFC Films
- Release dates: April 15, 2016 (Tribeca Film Festival); March 3, 2017 (United States)
- Running time: 109 minutes
- Country: United States
- Language: English

Wolves is a 2016 American sports drama film written and directed by Bart Freundlich and starring Michael Shannon, Carla Gugino, Taylor John Smith, Chris Bauer and John Douglas Thompson. The film was released on March 3, 2017, by IFC Films.

== Plot ==
Anthony is a standout player on his Manhattan high school's basketball team with seemingly everything going for him: a killer three-point shot, a loving girlfriend, and a chance at a scholarship to Cornell. But Anthony's dreams of playing college ball are jeopardized by his volatile father, a hard-drinking writer whose compulsive gambling threatens to derail the lives of both his wife and son.

== Cast ==
- Michael Shannon as Lee Keller
- Carla Gugino as Jenny Keller
- Taylor John Smith as Anthony Keller
- Chris Bauer as Charlie
- John Douglas Thompson as Socrates
- Zazie Beetz as Victoria
- Jessica Rothe as Lola
- Wayne Duvall as Coach Ray
- Danny Hoch as Sean
- Noah Le Gros as Oliver
- Christopher Meyer as Hakim
- Richard Kohnke as Billy Dunn
- Harry Thomas as Finals Referee

== Production ==
Principal photography began in June 2015.

== Release ==
The film premiered at the Tribeca Film Festival on April 15, 2016. The film was released on March 3, 2017, by IFC Films.

== Reception ==
=== Critical response ===
On review aggregator website Rotten Tomatoes, the film holds an approval rating of 36% based on 25 reviews, and an average rating of 4.8/10. On Metacritic, the film has a weighted average score of 46 out of 100, based on 13 critics, indicating "mixed or average reviews".

== See also ==
- List of basketball films
