= Don McKay (film) =

- Directed by: Jake Goldberger
- Written by: Jake Goldberger
- Produced by: Jim Young
- Starring: Thomas Haden Church; Elisabeth Shue; Melissa Leo; James Rebhorn; Keith David; M. Emmet Walsh
- Cinematography: Phil Parmet
- Edited by: Andrew Dickler
- Music by: Steven Bramson
- Production company: Animus Films
- Distributed by: Image Entertainment
- Release dates: April 24, 2009 (Tribeca); April 2, 2010 (United States)
- Running time: 87 minutes
- Country: United States
- Language: English
- Budget: $3 million

Don McKay is a 2009 independent drama thriller film written and directed by Jake Goldberger and starring Thomas Haden Church and Elisabeth Shue. It premiered at the 8th Annual Tribeca Film Festival in April 2009 and received a limited release on April 2, 2010.

== Plot ==
Don McKay (Thomas Haden Church) is a lonely high school janitor who one day receives a letter from his high school sweetheart, Sonny (Elisabeth Shue). In it, she asks him to come visit her back in their home town, because she is dying of an unnamed disease. At first he is reluctant because he had been a suspect in a murder case there years before, but Don decides to go. He arrives and gets a ride to Sonny's house by an eccentric cab driver named Samuel (M. Emmet Walsh).

Don meets Sonny, as well as her strange caregiver Marie (Melissa Leo). Marie's coldness towards Don makes it clear that she doesn't approve of his presence. Don spends the night, and he and Sonny make love. The next morning, Sonny's doctor, Lance Pryce (James Rebhorn) visits. While Marie and Sonny are out, Pryce attacks Don, and after a struggle, Don kills the man, and hides the body in a bed of leaves behind the garden. However, Don had just suffered an allergic reaction to a bee sting, and blacks out shortly after hiding the body. He awakens in the hospital, where Sonny proposes marriage and claims that she had recently spoken to Pryce.

Don goes to see his old friend Otis (Keith David), and tells him what happened. Otis agrees to help Don get rid of the body that night, but when he arrives it has vanished. Sonny rushes out, thinking the men are burglars, and Otis runs off. After an argument, Don returns home for a few days, eventually getting another letter from Sonny asking him to come back to her.

Samuel picks Don up again, but they are intercepted and kidnapped by a man named Mel (Pruitt Taylor Vince). Mel takes Don to a hotel room, where it is revealed that both Mel and Marie were planning all along to kill Don and take an inheritance Don would receive upon Don's marriage. Don tries to reason with the two stating that there is no inheritance, and that he has no idea what they are talking about. Marie refuses to believe him and tells him to go along with the plan, or they will go to the police about the death of Pryce. With Samuel in Mel's trunk, the four drive back to Sonny's house, and demand that Don go in wearing a wire, threatening to go to the police if he doesn't cooperate with their plan.

Upon arriving at the house, Don hastily proposes to Sonny, stating that he was confused before, but realizes now that he loves her. The doorbell rings; It's Marie and Mel, who enter the house. After a long confrontation, Sonny hits Marie over the head with a frozen ham, and kills her. Sonny then grabs the phone and calls 911 for help, stating that a man pretending to be a private detective just killed someone in her house.

She tells Don to kill Mel, and Don refuses. She grabs an ax and again asks him to kill Mel, but he refuses. Sonny then asks Mel to kill Don, and a struggle over the ax ensues between the men. Sonny kills Mel with the same frozen ham she killed Marie with, and tries to concoct a story to cover all of it. She tells Don that she'd been planning all along to take a large inheritance from Pryce, not Don, that he had received from a relative. It's also revealed that Pryce was her husband, and that the two were going to kill him together. However, Don reveals that he knows she isn't Sonny; he accidentally killed her and two friends in a fire when he was eighteen. He had left town in a haze of guilt and written letters to Sonny as a means of atonement. Sonny drops the ruse, and reveals her name to be Joanne.

The police arrive and Sonny lets them into the house. They find the bodies of Marie and Mel, and immediately arrest Don. Sonny is taken away in a police car, and the police start to take Don away. The police find Samuel and question Don about Samuel's involvement. Don asks Samuel to explain his knowledge of the situation to the police.

Because of Samuel's testimony, and the wire Don was wearing, the police let him go. Samuel tells Don to contact him if he ever needs anything. Don takes Samuel's phone number and boards the bus back home. At home, Don is seen sitting in a chair, a wasp lands on his cheek and the movie ends, leaving Don's fate unknown.

== Cast ==
- Thomas Haden Church as Don McKay
- Elisabeth Shue as Sonny
- James Rebhorn as Dr. Lance Pryce
- Melissa Leo as Marie
- M. Emmet Walsh as Samuel
- Keith David as Otis Kent
- Pruitt Taylor Vince as Mel
- Robert Wahlberg as Alfred

== Production ==
Filming took place in Andover, Massachusetts.

== Reception ==
On the review aggregator website Rotten Tomatoes, 38% of 26 critics' reviews are positive. The website's consensus reads: "Thomas Haden Church and Elisabeth Shue do their best with what they're given, but Don McKay is too confused and far-fetched to be taken seriously as a noir, and too inconsistent to work as a black comedy." Metacritic, which uses a weighted average, assigned the film a score of 50 out of 100, based on 13 critics, indicating "mixed or average" reviews.
