= Life of a King =

- Theatrical release poster
- Directed by: Jake Goldberger
- Written by: Jake Goldberger; David Scott; Dan Wetzel
- Produced by: Tatiana Kelly; Jim Young
- Starring: Cuba Gooding Jr. Dennis Haysbert; LisaGay Hamilton
- Cinematography: Mark Schwartzbard
- Edited by: Julie Garces
- Music by: Eric V. Hachikian
- Production company: Millennium Entertainment
- Release dates: June 22, 2013 (Los Angeles Film Festival); January 17, 2014 (United States)
- Running time: 100 minutes
- Country: United States
- Language: English
- Box office: $44,000

Life of a King is a 2013 American drama film directed by Jake Goldberger. The film stars Cuba Gooding Jr., Dennis Haysbert, and LisaGay Hamilton.

== Plot ==
The film tells the true story of Eugene Brown (Cuba Gooding Jr.), an ex-convict who starts the Big Chair Chess Club for inner-city youths in Washington, D.C.

Eugene is in prison where "Chess Man" gambles cigarettes with him over games of chess. Nearing release, Eugene is concerned about not having friends on the outside anymore. Chess Man gives him a wooden king chess piece, telling him, "take care of the King, everything else follows". Upon release, Eugene has trouble finding work due to his ex-con status. He attempts to reconnect with his daughter Katrina (Trini) who rebuffs his attempts but informs him that his son Marco is in Juvenile Hall for selling drugs.

Eugene's friend connects him with a job at a local high school working as a janitor. His former lieutenant, Perry, who is now in charge, also visits and tries to lure him back to crime. At the local high school, the students are unruly, deal drugs in detention, and scare off the detention monitor. The principal, Sheila King, asks Eugene to fill in as monitor for a few minutes. He proves to be unexpectedly persuasive at getting the students to sit and follow the rules and is allowed to return as the detention monitor until a full-time replacement can be found. Eugene bets on a game of cards with a student and wins, his prize being that the students will learn to play chess.

Two of the students, Tahime and Clifton, are dealing drugs and contemplating armed robbery. Eugene compares them to pawns working for a king he correctly calls "King Perry". Tahime proves to be an excellent chess player, but Clifton tells Perry that Eugene is preventing the sale of weed in detention, leading to reduced profits for Perry. Perry tips off the principal that Eugene is an ex-con, and she is forced to fire him.

Eugene attempts to restart the chess club by driving to the local hang out joint for the teenagers, but they refuse to play outside of detention. Peanut later changes his mind and Eugene makes him president of the chess club by giving him the wooden king piece. Eugene rents a run-down house for the club. Clifton and Tahime come to the chess house to get Peanut, whom they had recruited earlier, and take him to rob some drug dealers. Peanut is killed in the course of the robbery, and the chess house is vandalized when Eugene goes to comfort Tahime.

Tahime refuses to stay involved with Clifton and Perry. He comes back to the chess house and returns the wooden king piece he got from Peanut's body. The chess team regroups, restores the house, and begins advertising via flyers. Eugene convinces Tahime to compete in a chess tournament, but Tahime's mother refuses to sign the consent form. He forges her signature and enters the contest. Tahime wins but the officials disqualify the team due to the forged signature and the lack of birth certificates for the students, despite Eugene arguing that some students don't have birth certificates "where we come from." When a local radio producer invites Eugene and Tahime to present their argument on the air, Eugene admits that they didn't win because they didn't play by the rules, angering Tahime. Eugene's relationship with Trini is strained when he chooses to go after Tahime instead of getting Marco with her.

Tahime returns to play in the Washington, D.C. chess open tournament. He begins to study chess from a book and to practice relentlessly. Clifton is arrested and calls Perry from prison, but is hung up on, illustrating his role as a sacrificial pawn. Tahime advances to the final match and faces one of the best players in the country, J. Thomas Gaines. Tahime puts up a good fight but ultimately loses. Nonetheless, Tahime is congratulated by Gaines for a close match and gets a standing ovation from his supporters in the crowd, including his mother. A representative of the Urban League gives her card to Eugene, saying she wishes to help him go to college.

The film ends with Eugene's children visiting the chess house.

== Cast ==
- Cuba Gooding Jr. as Eugene
- Dennis Haysbert as Searcy
- LisaGay Hamilton as Sheila King
- Malcolm Mays as Tahime
- Richard T. Jones as Perry
- Jaida-Iman Benjamin as Rhonda
- Daniel Ross
- Kevin Hendricks as "Peanut"
- Blake Cooper Griffin as J. Thomas Gaines

== Release ==
The film debuted at the 2013 Los Angeles Film Festival and had its general American release on January 17, 2014 by Millennium Entertainment.

== Reception ==
Life of a King received mixed reviews from critics. The Washington Post gave it three out of four stars. Review aggregation website Metacritic gives a rating of 52 out of 100 based on reviews from seven critics, which indicates "mixed or average" reviews. The review aggregator website Rotten Tomatoes reported a 43% approval rating with an average rating of 5.5/10 based on 14 reviews. Christy Lemire of RogerEbert.com gave the film 2 out of 5, praising performance by Cuba Gooding Jr. and directing of Jake Goldberger, but criticizing Life of a King for being "awfully formulaic and predictable".
