= Claudia Mason =

American model and actress (born 1973)

- Born: New York City, United States (born March 9, 1973).
- Occupations: Actress, model
- Modeling information
- Height: 6 ft 0 in (1.83 m)
- Hair color: Brown
- Eye color: Brown
- Agency: The Model CoOp (New York) d'management group (Milan); Models 1 (London); Model Management (Hamburg); Munich Models (Munich)
- Website: https://www.claudiamason.com/

Claudia Mason (born March 9, 1973) is an American model and actress.

Mason has been featured on the covers of many fashion magazines including Vogue, Elle, W and Cosmopolitan. Mason has appeared in fashion campaigns for the likes of Louis Vuitton, Fendi, and Versace. She hosted MTV’s fashion special Fashionably Loud and starred in the Enrique Iglesias music video for "Rhythm Divine". She starred in the feature film Outpatient (2002) which was picked up for distribution by Magnolia Pictures following its reception at the Toronto Film Festival. She was also featured in the Woody Allen film Celebrity (1998). Mason completed a run of Tennessee Williams’ Orpheus Descending in LA (2010), which she produced as well as starred in as Carol Cutrere, alongside actors Gale Harold and Denise Crosby. The production was nominated for a McCulloh Award for best revival of a play by the Los Angeles Drama Critics Circle, and Mason also received Outstanding Performance by a Featured Actress.

== Early life ==
Mason was born and raised in Manhattan, New York. She began studying ballet at the age of five, training at the School of American Ballet. An Elite Model Management scout first discovered Mason in a record store at the age of 13. Her career took off, landing her in campaigns for Revlon, Versace, and Sportmax to name a few. She attended Fiorello H. LaGuardia High School of Music & Art and Performing Arts and then transferred to the Professional Children's School because her career took up so much of her time. Mason's father is black.

== Career ==
Claudia Mason’s first professional booking was for Vogue. Within her first few months of modeling, she had worked with great photographers like Mario Testino, Steven Meisel, Richard Avedon, Bruce Weber, and Patrick Demarchelier. In the early nineties, Mason was featured in Vogue, Mademoiselle, and Elle. Mason has worked for designers such as Yves Saint Laurent, Karl Lagerfield, Valentino, Armani, Versace, Christian Lacroix, Oscar de la Renta, Marc Jacobs, and Calvin Klein. Mason then landed roles in independent films Schmoozer, Discovering Daisy, LAX (2002), and Lime Salted Love (2006). She starred opposite Jason Kirk in Outpatient, an independent film. She also starred in the world premiere of Two Ships Passing at the Pan Andreas Theatre (2004), for which she was named Outstanding Female Actor in a Lead Role. Mason’s television appearances include guest roles on Kitchen Confidential, CSI:NY, How I Met Your Mother and October Road. She also appeared as a special guest on America’s Next Top Model (2007). Mason appeared in Ramma Moseley’s short film Grace (2009) and the film The Brass Teapot. She appears in UK indie, Spite & Malice: Rules to Filmmaking, as Charlotte Russell. In November 2013 Mason completed an off Broadway run of an original play called The Goddess directed by Alice Jankell.

== Personal life ==
Mason is an advocate for women’s health and has written about oocyte cryopreservation (egg freezing).

== Filmography ==
=== Films ===
Year	Title	Role
2013	Spite and Malice	Charlotte Russell
2012	The Brass Teapot	Donna
2009	Grace	Angela
2006	Lime Salted Love	Roxanne
2002	Outpatient	Raven
2002	LAX	Actress
2001	Discovering Daisy	Actress
1998	Schmoozer	Actress
2002	Celebrity	Woman at Elaine's

=== Television ===
Year	Title	Role	Notes
2008	Turbo Dates	Genevieve	1 Episode
2008	October Road	Vanessa	1 Episode
2006	How I Met Your Mother	Woman #1	1 Episode
2006	CSI:NY	Serena Portinova	1 Episode
2006	Kitchen Confidential	Beautiful Patron	1 Episode
2007	America's Next Top Model	Herself	1 Episode

=== Theater ===
Year	Title	Role	Notes
2013	The Goddess	The Goddess	Richmond Shepard Theatre
2010	Orpheus Descending	Carol Cutrere	Theater/Theatre
2004	Two Ships Passing	Doris Ship Murphy	Pan Andreas Theater

=== Music Videos ===
Year	Title	Role	Artist
1999	Rhythm Divine	Main Character	Enrique Iglesias
