= Jim Parrack =

American actor

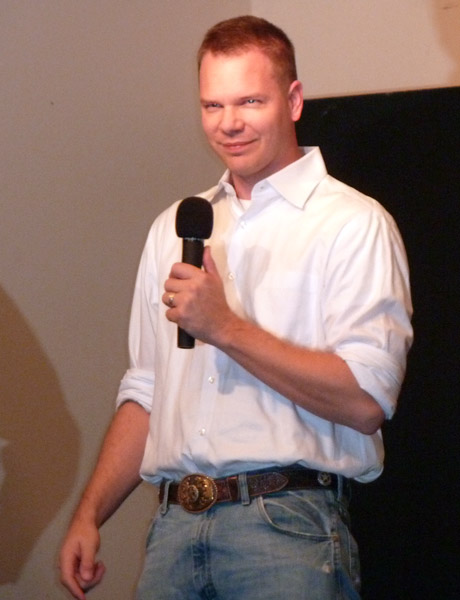
- Parrack in 2011
- Born: February 8, 1981 (age 45); Allen, Texas, U.S.
- Occupations: Actor, producer
- Years active: 2006–present
- Spouses: Ciera Danielle (m. 2008; div. 2014); Leven Rambin (m. 2015; ann. 2017); Hayley Walters (m. 2022)

Jim Parrack (born February 8, 1981) is an American actor best known for his role as Hoyt Fortenberry in HBO series True Blood. He has also appeared in the film Battle: Los Angeles and as "Slim" in the 2014 Broadway production of Of Mice and Men alongside James Franco, Chris O'Dowd and Leighton Meester. In 2020, he began starring in the Fox drama 9-1-1: Lone Star.

== Early life ==
Parrack was born on February 8, 1981, in Allen, Texas. He attended the co-ed Allen High School for secondary education. In 2001, Parrack moved to Los Angeles, California where he studied acting at The Stella Adler Academy and then at the Playhouse West.

== Career ==
Parrack made his screen debut in the 2006 drama film Annapolis. From 2006 to 2008, he made multiple guest appearances on television shows such as Monk, Grey's Anatomy, CSI: Crime Scene Investigation, and Criminal Minds. In 2008, Parrack was cast as Hoyt Fortenberry in the vampire television drama series True Blood. He was part of the main starring cast for the first five seasons, before departing for a season. Parrack returned to the show for the seventh and final season, again as a main cast member.

In 2011, Parrack returned to feature films, starring in the military science fiction war film Battle: Los Angeles. The film was directed by Jonathan Liebesman and co-starred Aaron Eckhart, Michelle Rodriguez, Bridget Moynahan, Ne-Yo, and Michael Peña. In 2013, he starred in the drama film Child of God and the Spanish-American drama A Night in Old Mexico. He co-starred in the films Fury (2014), The Adderall Diaries (2015), and Suicide Squad (2016). In 2014, Parrack joined the Broadway cast of Of Mice and Men, playing the role of Slim.

On September 18, 2019, he was cast as Judson "Judd" Ryder in the Fox drama series 9-1-1: Lone Star.

== Personal life ==
Parrack married actress/writer/director Ciera Danielle on October 19, 2008. He and Danielle separated in September 2013, and in June 2014 it was reported the couple had filed for divorce due to irreconcilable differences.

In Spring 2014, it was confirmed Parrack was in a relationship with The Hunger Games actress Leven Rambin. On October 10, 2015, they married in Texas. On May 9, 2017, the couple split. Rambin filed for and was granted an annulment, and the marriage was dissolved. Rambin has since referred to her relationship with Parrack as "abusive", and alleged that he had cheated on her.

He has been in a relationship with ballet dancer Hayley Walters since at least 2018. They married in 2022 and have one child together, a daughter born in 2025.

Parrack is the president of 120 Productions, Inc. He is good friends with actor James Franco.

== Filmography ==
=== Film ===
Year	Title	Role	Notes
2006	Annapolis	AJ	
2007	Finishing the Game	Jerry	
2011	Battle: Los Angeles	LCpl. Peter Kerns	
2011	Simone	Danny Wilard	Short
2011	Sal	Keir Dullea	
2011	Post	Jim	
2012	Courage to Create	Edward	Short
2012	The Audition	Danny	Short
2012	Hi My Name Is Max	Trever	Short
2013	Isolated	Ambassador for Peace	
2013	As I Lay Dying	Cash Bundren	
2013	Up the Valley and Beyond	Russ Meyer	Short
2013	Child of God	Deputy Cotton	
2013	A Night in Old Mexico	Moon	
2013	Daisy's	Prodigal Son	
2013	Filandra	James Chafitz	Short
2014	National Theatre Live: Of Mice and Men	Slim	
2014	The Sound and the Fury	Herbert Ames	
2014	Fury	Sergeant Binkowski	
2014	Riddance	Dean	Short
2014	Nerd Love	Himself	
2015	The Question	Adam	Short
2015	Wild Horses	Deputy Rogers	
2015	The Heyday of the Insensitive Bastards	Paul	
2015	The Adderall Diaries	Roger Dimitrov	
2015	Suburban Memoir	Mr. Waldie	Short
2015	Richard Peter Johnson	Himself	
2016	Sleeping Dogs	Detective Douglas	Short
2016	Red	Chet Archie	Short
2016	Suicide Squad	Jonny Frost	
2016	Priceless	Garo	
2017	The Labyrinth	Malvo	
2017	Actors Anonymous	-	
2017	Trouble	Curt	
2017	Lost Child	Mike Rivers	
2018	Last Supper	McCarthy	
2019	Buck Run	Officer Jim Daniels	
2019	God Send	Alex James	
2019	Not Today	Passenger	Short
2019	Silo	Junior	
2020	The Dark End of the Street	Richard	
2021	F9	Kenny Linder	
2023	Grace Point	Cutter	
2026	Disclosure Day	Cop	

=== Television ===
Year	Title	Role	Notes
2006	Monk	Roger Zisk	Episode: "Mr. Monk Bumps His Head"
2006	ER	Phil	Episode: "Out on a Limb"
2006	Standoff	Sam Ellis	Episode: "Partners in Crime"
2006	CSI: Crime Scene Investigation	Sgt. Jack Day	Episode: "Toe Tags"
2006	Grey's Anatomy	Ted Carr	Episode: "Where the Boys Are"
2006	Close to Home	Joe Nelson	Episode: "Shoot to Kill"
2007	NCIS: Naval Criminal Investigation Service	Nick Hurley	Episode: "Blowback"
2007	Raines	Deputy Mark Jessup	Episode: "Reconstructing Alice"
2007	Criminal Minds	Paul Mulford	Episode: "Open Season"
2008–2014	True Blood	Hoyt Fortenberry	Main Cast (season 1–5, 7)
2009	Supernatural	Nick Munroe	Episode: "Sex and Violence"
2010–2011	True Blood: Jessica's Blog	Hoyt Fortenberry	Guest Cast: Season 1-2
2012	Alcatraz	Guy Hastings	Episode: "Guy Hastings"
2015	Resurrection	Preacher James	Recurring Cast: Season 2
2017	The Blacklist: Redemption	Aldon Braddock	Episode: "Borealis 301"
2018	The Deuce	Russell	Recurring Cast: Season 2
2018	Escape at Dannemora	Police Officer Tarsia	Episode: "Part 6"
2019	Two Sentence Horror Stories	Ken	Episode: "Gentleman"
2020–2025	9-1-1: Lone Star	Judson “Judd”Ryder	Main Cast; 72 episodes
2025	Tracker	Ben Kinderson	Episode: “Nightingale”

=== Documentary ===
Year	Title
2008	So You Want Michael Madsen?

== Awards and nominations ==
Year	Award	Category	Work	Result
2009	Satellite Award	Best Cast – Television Series	True Blood (shared with cast)	Won
2010	Screen Actors Guild Award	Outstanding Performance by an Ensemble in a Drama Series	True Blood (shared with cast)	Nominated
