= Leven Rambin =

American actress (born 1990)

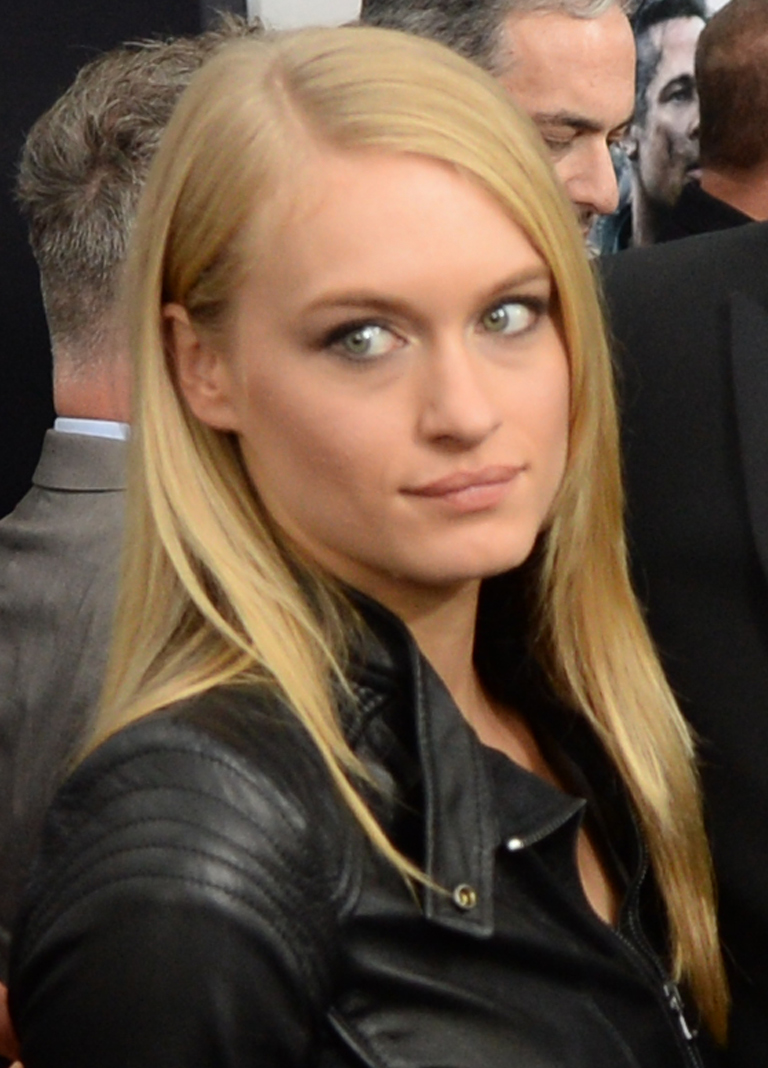
- Rambin in 2014
- Born: Leven Alice Rambin; May 17, 1990 (age 36); Houston, Texas, U.S
- Occupation: Actress
- Years active: 2003–present
- Spouse: Jim Parrack (m. 2015; ann. 2017) Dawson Smith (m. 2025)

Leven Alice Rambin (born May 17, 1990) is an American actress. She is known for playing look-alike half-sisters Lily Montgomery and Ava Benton on All My Children, and for her recurring roles on Grey's Anatomy and Gone, as well as Terminator: The Sarah Connor Chronicles, One Tree Hill, Wizards of Waverly Place, and CSI: Miami. She appeared in the sci-fi film The Hunger Games (2012) as the District 1 tribute Glimmer, and appeared as Clarisse La Rue in the fantasy film Percy Jackson: Sea of Monsters (2013).

== Early life ==
Rambin was born in Houston, Texas, to Howard and Karen Rambin, founders of a real estate company. She attended St. Francis Episcopal School before high school. While acting, she has also pursued her high school diploma through the Texas Tech University Independent School District.

== Career ==
=== 2004–09: Early works ===
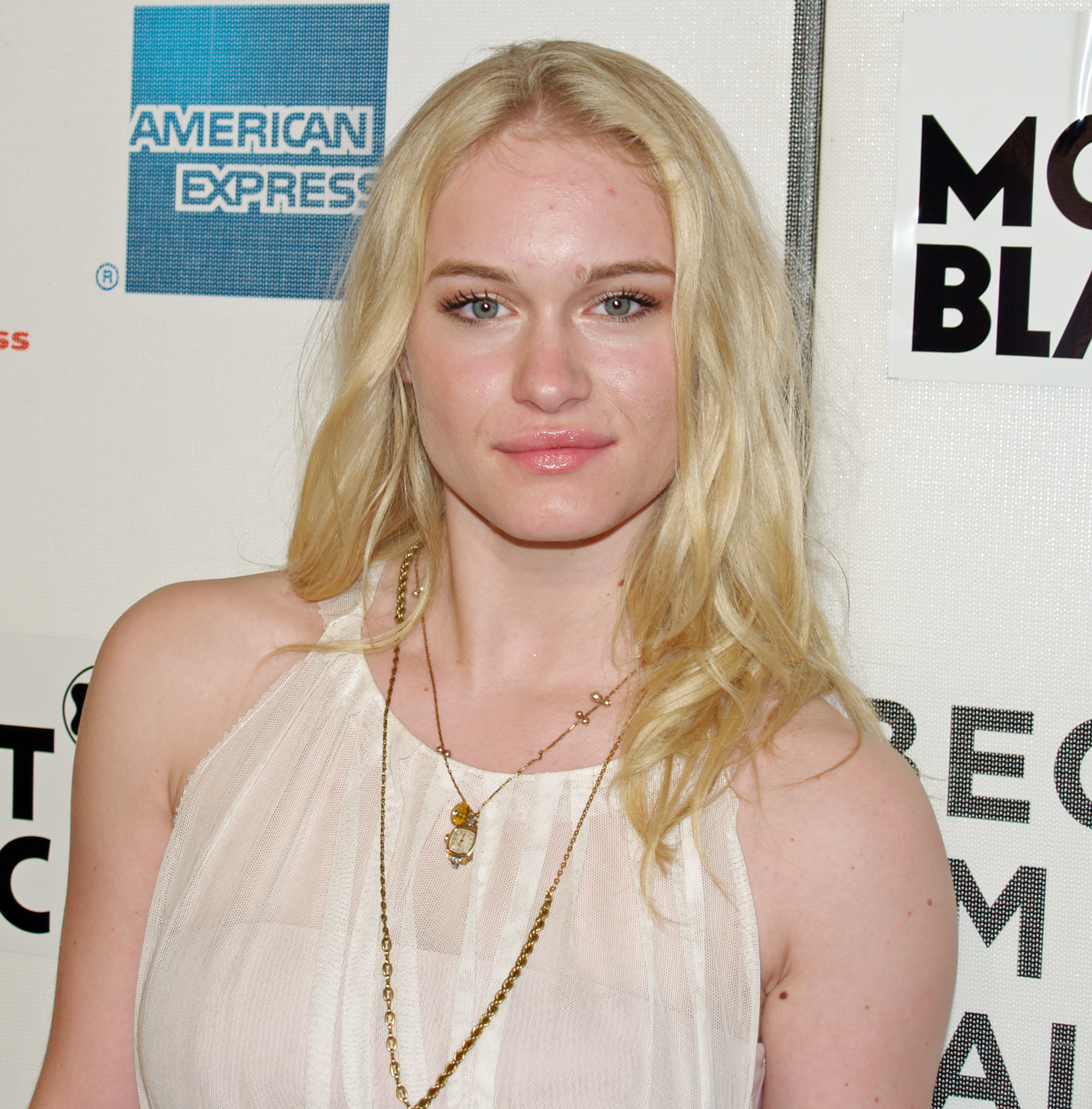
Rambin at the premiere of War, Inc. at the 2008 Tribeca Film Festival

Rambin started her career aged 13, as a series regular on ABC's All My Children from 2004 to 2008, playing the role of Lily Montgomery, the autistic daughter of Jackson Montgomery, played by Walt Willey. It was announced that Rambin had been cast in another role on All My Children, playing the street-smart but lovable older half sister of Lily Montgomery, Ava Benton, where the role only lasted for two consecutive years. Rambin was the only actress from All My Children to be nominated for the 33rd Annual Daytime Awards and 34th Annual Daytime Emmy Awards. She was nominated for Outstanding Younger Actress in a Drama Series for her roles of Lily Montgomery and Ava Benton. She later appeared on an episode of Law & Order: Special Victims Unit.

Rambin appeared on NBC's new series, Lipstick Jungle. Leven filmed a pilot presentation for the CW titled Austin Golden Hour, directed by Sanford Bookstaver. Leven made her feature film debut in Killer Film's independent picture, Gigantic (2008). The film starred Paul Dano. Rambin joined the cast of Terminator: The Sarah Connor Chronicles, playing the character Riley Dawson, a school friend and love interest of John Connor. Rambin left the show after filming her last episode "Ourselves Alone".. Rambin landed a recurring role as Sloan Riley, the 18-year-old-daughter of Dr. Mark Sloan on the medical-drama, Grey's Anatomy. Rambin briefly returned to All My Children as Lily Montgomery on January 5, 2010 for the show's 40th Anniversary.

=== 2010–13: Breakthrough ===
In 2010, Rambin appeared as the daughter of Virginia Madsen's and David James Elliott's characters on the ABC television series, Scoundrels. However, the series ended its eight-episode run on August 15, 2010, due to low ratings. Rambin appeared on the Disney Channel show, Wizards of Waverly Place, in the recurring role of Rosie, who is a Guardian Angel turned Angel of Darkness who was in love with Justin to steal the Moral Compass; Rambin made her debut on the episode "Everything Rosie for Justin" and left the show after the episode "Wizards vs. Angels". Later, Rambin was cast in the recurring role of Chloe Hall, on the long-running CW series, One Tree Hill. Then later, Rambin was cast as Molly Sloan on the CBS crime-drama CSI: Miami.

It was announced that Lionsgate and director Gary Ross cast Rambin in her first major studio film, in the role of Glimmer, the cut-throat District 1 Tribute in the first film adaption (2012) of the popular book series called The Hunger Games by Suzanne Collins. In an interview with Seventeen, Rambin explained how she trained for the role, "I did a lot of sword training, which was really challenging. I also did a lot of boxing training and hand-to-hand combat. I just had to get in the mindset of someone who would want to do that every day! It was cool because I pushed myself physically and mentally. I couldn’t be vain about being sweating and smelling gross or worry about taking a hit or two.". After the film's success, Rambin and the cast of The Hunger Games went on a The Hunger Games Convention Tour and also appeared in The World Is Watching: Making the Hunger Games.

Further film roles include Chasing Mavericks (2012), which is based on a real-life story about a surfer called Jay Moriarty. In the film, Rambin played the lead love interest, Kim Moriarty. Rambin later starred in the music video for Green Day's "Stray Heart" which was officially released on November 7, 2012.

Rambin had a lead role in the fantasy film Percy Jackson: Sea of Monsters (2013), playing Clarisse La Rue, a hot-tempered, arrogant, large, and strong demigod (also the lead counselor of the Ares Cabin 5) and Percy's rival throughout the story. In an interview with comingsoon.net, Rambin explained her casting and her time as a brunette, "Yeah, I was really lucky that Thor was able to see me as a brunette with this blonde hair. That's not typically the first thing that comes to mind when you look at me, I don't think. But when I put on that wig – luckily they didn't dye my hair – and change my physicality a lot... Nothing against brunettes – I still felt beautiful. But I felt a lot less inhibited, and I felt down to be a little more brash and powerful and strong. I kind of hid behind all this brown hair, and it gave me the power and confidence to verbally rip this one over here. [Laughs.]" Her portrayal as Clarisse was met with mostly positive reviews. In 2013, Rambin moved to New York City to study acting full-time at the Playhouse West Brooklyn Lab and is now a teacher and staff member at the school.

=== 2014–present ===
Rambin was cast as Daisy in the romantic comedy Two Night Stand (2014). Rambin appeared in the comedy drama, Walter (2014) as Kendall, the main love interest of the title character. Rambin also appeared in Seven Minutes (2014) as Kate. She was cast as Natalie in The Tomorrow People, appearing in the final three episodes of the television series in 2014. Rambin later appeared in True Detective as Athena Bezzerides and appeared in the film I Am Michael in 2015 as Catherine. In 2014, she landed the lead role of Kayla Canyon in the independently produced pilot, Dr. Del, opposite John Hawkes. Later that year, she was cast in the lead role of Fern Sreaves in Tatterdemalion, an independent film co-written and directed by Ramaa Moseley. In 2016, she was cast in a series regular role on the Hulu cult drama, The Path, opposite Aaron Paul and Michelle Monaghan. In 2017, Rambin was cast in the starring role of Kick Lanigan in the NBC Universal series, Gone, based on the novel One Kick by Chelsea Cain.

== Personal life ==
Rambin was previously engaged to producer Geoffrey James Clark. She began dating True Blood actor Jim Parrack in the second quarter of 2014. The couple became engaged in August 2014. and married October 10, 2015. In March 2017, it was announced that the couple had split after less than two years of marriage. Rambin filed and was granted an annulment, and the marriage was dissolved. Rambin has since referred to her relationship with Parrack as "abusive", later revealing that he had cheated on her. Rambin is a Christian.

Rambin is a fashion enthusiast and has written several editorials on New York Fashion Week for Paper Magazine and Page Six. Rambin is very passionate about autism research and awareness as well as the humane treatment of animals. Rambin is also involved with Surf for Life, an organization that creates educational and cultural development projects in coastal communities around the world.

== Filmography ==
List of film performances
Year	Title	Role	Notes
2008	Gigantic	Missy Thaxton	
2010	Babe	Sarah	Short film
2010	Case 219	Carla Evans	
2012	The Hunger Games	Glimmer	
2012	Chasing Mavericks	Kim Moriarity	
2013	Isolated	Ambassador for Peace	
2013	Percy Jackson: Sea of Monsters	Clarisse La Rue	
2014	Two Night Stand	Daisy	
2014	Seven Minutes	Kate	
2014	Dissonance	Cera	Short film
2014	Walter	Kendall	
2015	I Am Michael	Catherine	
2018	Lost Child	Fern	
2019	The Dirt	Sharise	
2020	The Big Ugly	Kara	
2020	Mank	Eve Metcalf	
2021	The Forever Purge	Harper Tucker	

List of television performances
Year	Title	Role	Notes
2004–2008, 2010	All My Children	Lily Montgomery & Ava Benton	Main cast; 162 Episodes. Nominated—Outstanding Female Newcomer; Nominated—Outstanding Younger Actress in a Drama Series; Nominated—Outstanding Younger Actress in a Drama Series
2006	The Book of Daniel	Caroline Paxton	Main cast; 4 Episodes.
2007	Law & Order: Special Victims Unit	Reagan Michaels	Episode: "Responsible"
2008	Lipstick Jungle	Chloe Jamison	Episode: "Chapter Four: Bombay Highway"
2008	Austin Golden Hour	Annie	Television film.
2008–2009	Terminator: The Sarah Connor Chronicles	Riley Dawson	Recurring cast; 10 Episodes.
2009–2010	Grey's Anatomy	Sloan Riley	Recurring role; 5 Episodes.
2010	Good Morning Rabbit	Dumbleshe	Episode: "National Hamburger Day"
2010	Private Practice	Sloan Riley	Episode: "Another Second Chance"
2010	Scoundrels	Heather West	Main cast; 8 Episodes.
2011	Wizards of Waverly Place	Rosie	Recurring role; 3 Episodes.
2011	CSI: Miami	Molly Sloan	Recurring role; 4 Episodes.
2011	One Tree Hill	Chloe Hall	Recurring role; 3 Episodes.
2014	The Tomorrow People	Natalie	Recurring role; 3 Episodes.
2015	True Detective	Athena Bezzerides	Recurring role; 5 Episodes.
2017	The Path	Chloe Jones	Recurring role
2017	Gone	Kit "Kick" Lannigan	Main cast
2024–present	Fire Country	Audrey James	Recurring role

List of music video performances
Song	Year	Artist	Director	Reference(s)
"Stray Heart"	2012	Green Day	Robert Schober	—N/a

== Awards and nominations ==
Year	Organisation	Award	Role	Result
2005	19th Soap Opera Digest Awards	Outstanding Female Newcomer	Lily Montgomery	Won
2006	33rd Daytime Emmy Awards	Outstanding Younger Actress in a Drama Series	Lily Montgomery and Ava Benton	Won
2007	34th Daytime Emmy Awards	Outstanding Younger Actress in a Drama Series	Lily Montgomery and Ava Benton	Won
