= Pola Negri: Life Is a Dream in Cinema =

Pola Negri: Life is a Dream in Cinema
- DVD cover
- Directed by: Mariusz Kotowski
- Written by: Lynn Moran
- Based on: Life of Pola Negri
- Produced by: Heidi Hutter (executive producer)
- Starring: Hayley Mills; Eli Wallach; A.C. Lyles; Cyndi Williams (narrator)
- Cinematography: Simone Zimmerman; Elke Stappert; John Schaaf (assistant cinematographer)
- Edited by: John Larsen
- Music by: Frédéric Chopin (composer)
- Production company: Bright Shining City Productions
- Release date: 2006
- Running time: 89 minutes
- Country: United States
- Language: English

Pola Negri: Life is a Dream in Cinema is a feature-length biographical documentary film by Polish-American director Mariusz Kotowski released in 2006. The film chronicles the life of Polish silent film actress Pola Negri, as told by those who knew her and those who have studied her life and films.

The documentary is the first directorial work of Polish-born director Mariusz Kotowski. Kotowski had previously worked as a dancer and dance choreographer, and invested three years of work and a considerable personal fortune into producing the Pola Negri: Life is a Dream in Cinema documentary. He has gone on to direct the Holocaust film Esther's Diary (2010, originally released as Forgiveness [2008]), which featured a lead character built strongly on Pola Negri, and the erotic psychological thriller Deeper and Deeper (2009) starring David Lago (The Young and the Restless). Kotowski also went on to author a Polish-language Pola Negri biography entitled Pola Negri: Legenda Hollywood (English title: Pola Negri: Hollywood Legend), which was released in Poland in 2011.

== Interviews and narration ==
The most notable interviews in Pola Negri: Life is a Dream in Cinema are with film stars Hayley Mills and Eli Wallach. Mills was starring actress and Wallach supporting actor in the Walt Disney film The Moon-Spinners (1964), Pola Negri's final film. In the documentary, both actors retell their stories of working with Negri in that film.

Others interviewed for the film included Jeanine Basinger, professor and author; A.C. Lyles, producer for Paramount Pictures; Alfred Allan Lewis, ghostwriter of Pola Negri's autobiography Memoirs of a Star (1970); Emily Leider, author of Rudolph Valentino biography Dark Lover; Anthony Slide, film historian; David Gasten, webmaster of The Pola Negri Appreciation Site; and Scott Eyman, author of Ernst Lubitsch: Laughter in Paradise.

The documentary is narrated by actress Cyndi Williams, who played a small voiceover role in Kotowski's Esther's Diary and a supporting live action role in Deeper and Deeper, making her the only actor to appear as a cast member in all of Kotowski's films to date.

== Preview films and trailers ==
The film's production company Bright Shining City Productions has released several different trailers and preview short subjects for Pola Negri: Life is a Dream in Cinema. The first, released in 2005, was an untitled 14-minute preview trailer that was released while the feature film itself was still being edited; this short film was re-edited slightly and reissued as the 16-minute, two-part short subject Pola Negri: Hollywood Legend. Both versions of this short subject are notable for featuring interview footage with Polish-born model Agnieszka Zakreta, best known as the 2003 Miss Illinois USA. None of Miss Zakreta's interview footage was used in the feature film. The most recent trailer, released in June 2010 and running four and one-half minutes long, is a compilation of excerpts from Pola Negri's musical numbers in A Woman Commands (1932) and Mazurka (1935) interspersed with highlights from many of her films.

== Screenings and awards ==
Pola Negri: Life is a Dream in Cinema made its world premiere on April 29, 2006 at Laemmle's Sunset 5 Theatre in Hollywood as part of the Seventh Annual Polish Film Festival of Los Angeles. The film went on to appear at the Museum of Modern Art (MoMA) in New York and La Cinémathèque Française in Paris, appeared in numerous film festivals and Pola Negri film retrospectives in the United States and Europe, and was featured in a lengthy 35 minute news report about the making of the film on Poland's TVP1 channel.

The documentary was also the recipient of the following awards:

- WorldFest-Houston International Film Festival - Remi Award, Special Jury Selection - April 2006
- Dixie Film Festival, Atlanta - Best Documentary - October 2006
- EMPixx Award - Gold - 2009
- IndieFest - Award of Excellence - 2010
- Southern California Motion Picture Council - Golden Halo Award - 2010

== DVD release ==
Director Mariusz Kotowski's production company Bright Shining City Productions released Pola Negri: Life is a Dream in Cinema on DVD in 2010 as part of a DVD/poster set. The set is currently being sold direct via Bright Shining City Productions' official website.

== Cast ==
=== Main ===
- Hayley Mills (star of Negri's final film The Moon-Spinners)
- Eli Wallach, (supporting actor in The Moon-Spinners)
- A.C. Lyles (producer for Paramount Pictures)
- Cyndi Williams as the Narrator

=== Other interviewees ===
- Jeanine Basinger (film historian, professor and author of numerous film books)
- Scott Eyman (author of the book Ernst Lubitsch: Laughter in Paradise)
- David Gasten (webmaster, The Pola Negri Appreciation Site)
- Brother Alexis Gonzales, FSC (late professor at Loyola University New Orleans, who knew Pola Negri personally)
- Emily Leider (author of Rudolph Valentino biography Dark Lover: The Life and Death of Rudolph Valentino)
- Allan Alfred Lewis (ghostwriter of Pola Negri autobiography Memoirs of a Star)
- George Schoenbrunn (close friend of Pola Negri's)
- Anthony Slide (film historian and author of numerous film books)
- Tony Villecco (author of unpublished biography about Pola Negri)

=== Dancers in tango sequence ===
- Dario DaSilva
- Roula Giannopoulou
- Lorraine Muller
- Carolina Orlonsky
- Felipe Telpora Jr.
- Ivan Terrazas

== Crew ==
- Mariusz Kotowski, director
- Heidi Hutter, executive producer
- Lynn Moran, screenwriter
- Mariusz Gorz, music score
- Simone Zimmerman, director of photography
- Elke Stappert, director of photography
- John Schaaf, assistant cinematographer
- Brian Burrowes, animation
- John Larsen, editor
- Richard Shirt, music consultant
- Bonena Konkiel, music consultant

Music used for soundtrack taken from Frédéric Chopin's 24 Preludes, Op. 28: No. 4 in E minor ("Suffocation"), No. 7 in A Major ("The Polish Dancer"), No. 15 in D Flat Major ("Raindrop"), and No. 21 in B Flat Major ("Sunday")

Voiceover recording by Black Productions; Phillip Hubner, engineer
Audio post production by David Bewley and Corey Roberts, 501 Audio, Austin
Color correction by Omar Godinez and Mike Curtis, Color Cafe, Austin

Tango scenes choreographed by Mariusz Kotowski and filmed in New York.

Film and photo sources: Photofest, St. Mary's University (Texas), Library of Moving Images, New York Public Library at Lincoln Center, New-York Historical Society

Location footage shot in Los Angeles, New York, and San Antonio.

== See also ==
- Pola Negri
- Hayley Mills
- Eli Wallach
- A.C. Lyles
