= Black Maps and Motel Rooms =

- True Detective episode
- Episode no.: Season 2 Episode 7
- Directed by: Daniel Attias
- Written by: Nic Pizzolatto
- Cinematography by: Nigel Bluck
- Editing by: Chris Figler
- Original air date: August 2, 2015
- Running time: 64 minutes

Guest appearances
- David Morse as Eliot Bezzerides; Ritchie Coster as Mayor Austin Chessani; Christopher James Baker as Blake Churchman; James Frain as Lieutenant Kevin Burris; Michael Hyatt as Katherine Davis; Afemo Omilami as Police Chief Holloway; Timothy V. Murphy as Osip Agronov; Chris Kerson as Nails; Michael Irby as Detective Elvis Ilinca; Solomon Shiv as Michael Bulgari; Jack Topalian as Armin; Arthur Darbinyan as Leonid; Lolita Davidovich as Cynthia Woodrugh; Leven Rambin as Athena Bezzerides; Adria Arjona as Emily; Carla Vila as Danielle Delvayo; Miranda Rae Mayo as Vera Machiado; Gabriel Luna as Miguel Gilb; Mark Chaet as Jew Diamond Dealer; Peter Douglas as Pit Boss; Sheila Cutchlow as Travel Agent; Yevgeniy Kartashov as Alex

Episode chronology
| ← Previous "Church in Ruins" | Next → "Omega Station" |
- True Detective (season 2)

"Black Maps and Motel Rooms" is the seventh episode of the second season of the American anthology crime drama television series True Detective. It is the 15th overall episode of the series and was written by series creator Nic Pizzolatto, and directed by Daniel Attias. It was first broadcast on HBO in the United States on August 2, 2015.

The season is set in California and focuses on three detectives, Ray Velcoro (Colin Farrell), Ani Bezzerides (Rachel McAdams) and Paul Woodrugh (Taylor Kitsch), from three cooperating police forces and a criminal-turned-businessman named Frank Semyon (Vince Vaughn) as they investigate a series of crimes they believe are linked to the murder of a corrupt politician. In the episode, Velcoro, Bezzerides and Woodrugh use the information they obtained to finally connect all cases, while Semyon sets out to take care of his loyalties.

According to Nielsen Media Research, the episode was seen by an estimated 2.18 million household viewers and gained a 1.0 ratings share among adults aged 18–49. The episode received very positive reviews from critics, who praised the performances, character development and ending.

== Plot ==
After escaping from the mansion, Velcoro (Colin Farrell), Bezzerides (Rachel McAdams), Woodrugh (Taylor Kitsch) and Vera (Miranda Rae Mayo) stay at a motel. Bezzerides, intoxicated and panicked after the events, attempts to seek comfort in Velcoro; he rebuffs her advances. Velcoro and Woodrugh check the stolen documents, which link Catalast and McCandless (Jon Lindstrom) to Osip (Timothy V. Murphy). They also find a buy-sell clause upon death in the documents, leading to Caspere's shares in the land deal being sold for pennies and redistributed. As they continue to investigate, Woodrugh is privately sent pictures of his sexual encounter with Miguel Glib (Gabriel Luna), via an unknown number.

When Vera (Miranda Rae Mayo) wakes, Bezzerides asks about the photos in the safe deposit box, including the blue diamonds. Vera reveals that another escort, Tascha, compiled blackmail evidence on Caspere and his associates. When Tascha was found out, Tony Chessani (Vinicius Machado) tortured her at the shed in Guerneville. Vera also states that she refuses to testify, as she had a good life as an escort, and resents Bezzerides for rescuing her.

Velcoro visits Semyon (Vince Vaughn) at his casino to disclose information on the people involved at the mansion, revealing Osip's role. Semyon, in return, reveals Irina Rulfo's death and that she was contacted by a police officer to pawn Caspere's diamonds. He also promises to get the name of the man who tipped him off regarding Velcoro's wife's (Abigail Spencer) assailant. Semyon and Jordan (Kelly Reilly) discuss leaving criminal life behind, but he does not want to give up his enterprise.

Velcoro meets with Davis (Michael Hyatt) to disclose the new information, but discovers that she has been murdered. Woodrugh moves Emily (Adria Arjona) and Cynthia (Lolita Davidovich) out of the city and into a motel while Bezzerides does the same with Athena (Leven Rambin) and Eliot (David Morse), putting them in care of Ilinca (Michael Irby) and en route to Oregon. Before departing, Eliot and Bezzerides discuss the man she saw in her hallucination, implying that Bezzerides was molested as a child in Eliot's commune.

Woodrugh retrieves information from the police department. He discovers that Dixon (W. Earl Brown) and Burris (James Frain) were the arresting officers during the 1992 jewelry store robbery, with Holloway (Afemo Omilami) serving as the commanding officer. He also discovers that Caspere was a former Chief Accountant in the Internal Audits division.

Using the information that Velcoro provided, Semyon brutally attacks Blake (Christopher James Baker), who confesses to conspiring with Osip and Tony Chessani but claims that no one knows who killed Caspere. He confesses to killing Stan, who had blackmail evidence on Blake's role in the land deal. He also reveals that Osip and McCandless are soon meeting in Ojai, where Osip will pay for Caspere's shares. He then warns Semyon that Osip's associates will soon have bought the loyalty of all of Semyon's henchmen, with the exception of Nails (Chris Kerson), and offers to work as a double agent for him. Semyon is not interested. When Semyon asks him why he gave him a bad tip years ago, revealing Blake as the informant in the Velcoro rape situation, Blake tells him he was trying to help Semyon move up in the criminal world. Semyon shoots Blake and watches him bleed to death in the casino office. He then brings Jordan into the office, instructing her to pack a bag and prepare to leave their life behind.

Back at the motel room, Velcoro, Bezzerides, and Woodrugh discuss Bezzerides and Velcoro's fugitive statuses, as Bezzerides is wanted for questioning in the death of the mansion guard and Velcoro is a person of interest in Davis' death. The three conclude that during the 1992 Los Angeles riots, Burris, Holloway, Dixon, and Caspere worked together to steal the blue diamonds, which they used to buy into the Vinci power structure and inflate their salaries. This explains the supposed robbery at Caspere's house, as they were looking for the diamonds, the last piece of evidence that tied them to the 1992 robbery-homicide. However, they are still unsure of who killed Caspere; neither Burris, Holloway, or Dixon would do it as it would draw attention to them. Woodrugh is once again contacted by the stranger, claiming that they need to meet at the Los Angeles County Hall of Records or they will leak the pictures, forcing him to leave the motel.

Semyon starts gathering money, plane tickets, new IDs, cars, and weapons, intending for him and Jordan to flee to Venezuela. He also meets with Chessani (Ritchie Coster) at the casino bar, informing him of his son Tony's partnership with Osip and McCandless. Moments later, he is approached by Osip, who claims that he is buying the casino and offers Semyon a position working for him. Semyon goes along with it, feigning deference about his lack of experience in the land deal. Later, Semyon evacuates the casino on a false alarm by telling security about a gas leak. He then kills one of Osip's guards, cuts a gas line, and pours gasoline over the floors of the casino and several other properties. From the top of a nearby hill, Semyon watches his former businesses burn.

Woodrugh informs Velcoro that he must deal with the blackmail and goes to the location, where Glib is found standing. Glib reveals he now works in private security for Catalast and was tasked with investigating Woodrugh after the Lacey Lindel (Ashley Hinshaw) incident, making sure that Woodrugh did not break confidentiality surrounding his time at Black Mountain. Glib leads him through an underground tunnel to meet Holloway, the person responsible for the blackmail messages, as well as a group of men from Black Mountain. Holloway asks for the stolen documents, to which Woodrugh says he could call and set up Velcoro for. As he tries to call, he attacks Holloway and holds him at gunpoint. After knocking him out, Woodrugh starts running as Holloway's henchmen shoot at him.

Back in the motel room, Velcoro and Bezzerides look through Vera's photos, and identify a woman at a party as Erica, Caspere's secretary in the city manager's office. However, Bezzerides mentions that Vera identified the woman as someone named Laura, which is also the name of one of the orphans from the 1992 robbery. Velcoro and Bezzerides examine the photo of the orphans side-by-side with the party photo. Later, the two connect emotionally through their respective traumas and have sex.

Woodrugh evades the hitmen and kills all of them, including Glib, who he uses as a human shield. Woodrugh escapes from the tunnels, finally getting a signal for his phone. Just as he is leaving, Burris shoots him in the back and then in the head, killing him. Burris then evacuates the scene, leaving Woodrugh's corpse behind.

== Production ==
=== Development ===
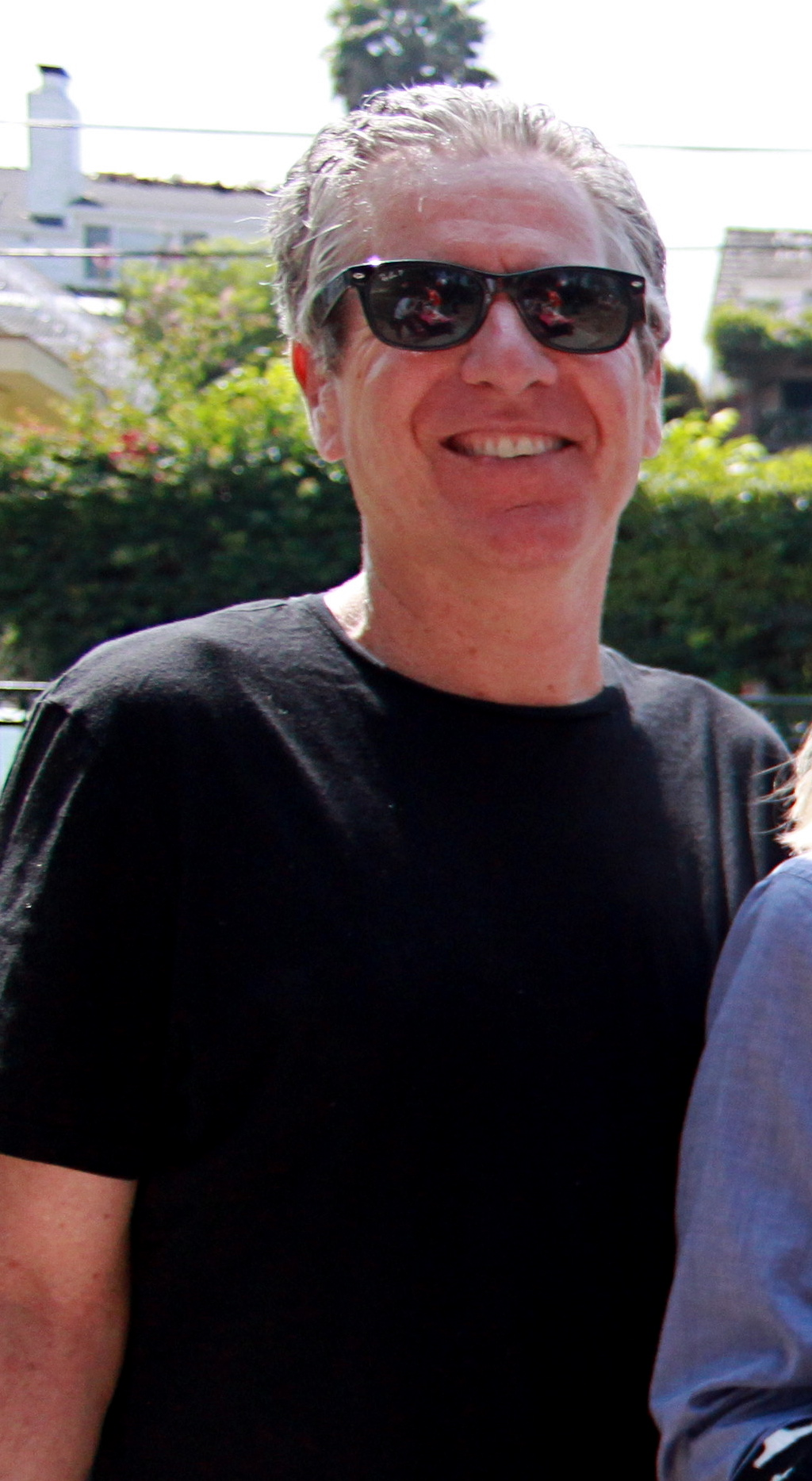
Daniel Attias directed the episode.

In June 2015, the episode's title was revealed as "Black Maps and Motel Rooms" and it was announced that series creator Nic Pizzolatto had written the episode while Daniel Attias had directed it. This was Pizzolatto's fifteenth writing credit, and Attias' first directing credit.

== Reception ==
=== Viewers ===
The episode was watched by 2.18 million viewers, earning a 1.0 in the 18-49 rating demographics on the Nielson ratings scale. This means that 1 percent of all households with televisions watched the episode. This was a 7% decrease from the previous episode, which was watched by 2.34 million viewers with a 1.0 in the 18-49 demographics.

=== Critical reviews ===
"Black Maps and Motel Rooms" received very positive reviews from critics. The review aggregator website Rotten Tomatoes reported an 84% approval rating for the episode, based on 25 reviews, with an average rating of 7.95/10. The site's consensus states: "Tense and tightly paced, 'Black Maps and Motel Rooms' finds the disparate -- and often vague -- strands of True Detective coming into sharper focus."

Matt Fowler of IGN gave the episode a "great" 8.5 out of 10 and wrote in his verdict, "True Detective put the screws to our heroes this week, placing them, for the first time in this season, in the crosshairs of the various villains pulling the strings behind the scenes. Sure, they'd all stumbled before. But that was either due to their own personal demons or the half-season street shootout that was designed to cause chaos/upend their careers. Here, they were lost and scared. Scrambling to figure out their next move. And down came Paul, whose own dark private security past came back to find him."

Erik Adams of The A.V. Club gave the episode an "A−" grade and wrote, "True Detective season two wants you to be watching the whole chessboard at all times, but it's playing chess by mail — you have to wait at least seven days to find out what meaning (if any) the previous move had, and the entire game lasts two months. Unfortunately, it's only in the last two weeks that the show has delivered anything that makes the next move worth anticipating. With Ani and Ray on the lam, Paul potentially out of the picture, and Frank watching his world burn, 'Black Maps And Motel Rooms' sets up one explosive checkmate."

Alan Sepinwall of HitFix wrote, "For a while, I've just been waiting for the story to end so we can move onto the next season in the hopes that the show can rebound. This episode doesn't retroactively fix the myriad issues with the earlier episodes, but it at least has me curious to see the conclusion of the story for its own sake, and not simply as an excuse to be done with it." Gwilym Mumford of The Guardian wrote, "The jittery momentum builds as the series’s climax comes into view, and at last we actually care about the fates of our true detectives." Ben Travers of IndieWire gave the episode a "B+" grade and wrote, "There's plenty of ground to cover in Episode 8. Hopefully it will be done with a similar sense of urgency."

Darren Franich of Entertainment Weekly wrote, "My new theory is that True Detective season 2 isn't a failed drama. It's successful pro-drug propaganda. The subtext to every episode is: 'Look how much more interesting these boring people are when they take drugs!'" Aaron Riccio of Slant Magazine wrote, "The problem with mysteries, especially fair-play ones, is that if you've paid close enough attention and solved it ahead of schedule, then a table-setting episode like 'Black Maps and Hotels Rooms', in which characters constantly explain how the pieces fit together, is nothing short of irritating. That's because solving a jigsaw puzzle, for instance, can never be as satisfying as the act of physically putting it together. That, of course, is just one perspective, and the real heart of the episode comes from the constant reminder that we all have different needs and wants."

Kenny Herzog of Vulture gave the episode a 4 star rating out of 5 and wrote, "At least we'll all know soon enough what everyone on this hotly debated True Detective season takes with them and leaves behind, now that only one chapter remains." Tony Sokol of Den of Geek gave the episode a perfect 5 star rating out of 5 and wrote, "'Black Maps and Motel Rooms' was a dense and satisfying and upheld the HBO tradition that no one is safe on their series. The true detectives on True Detective follow black maps and real estate contracts as they untangle an intensely complicated web of intrigue that led to a fairly simple crime: A 23-year old robbery and double homicide."

Carissa Pavlica of TV Fanatic gave the episode a 3 star rating out of 5 and wrote, "If you were holding your breath, hoping that 'Black Maps and Motel Rooms' was going to raise the stakes and lead us into one hell of a finale, you were sadly mistaken. It was a swing and a miss this season, drama fans. We already knew that, but it's in our nature to hold out hope until the final inning, isn't it? Sorry, waiting for the finale isn't going to cut it. This was the make it or break it installment, and since they were still introducing new elements of the 'mystery' that only made things more confusing, I'm cutting my losses." Shane Ryan of Paste gave the episode a 9.1 out of 10 and wrote, "Call it hope, and 'Black Maps and Hotel Rooms' was the episode where our hope paid off."
