= Bright Shining City Productions =

- Industry: Film and Media
- Headquarters: Austin, Texas
- Owner: Mariusz Kotowski

Bright Shining City Productions is an independent film and media production company established in Austin, Texas by Polish-American film director and producer Mariusz Kotowski in 2005. The company's initial film project was the full-length documentary Pola Negri: Life is a Dream in Cinema, highlighting the career of Polish silent film star Pola Negri. The production company went on to release the narrative films Forgiveness (2008, re-released as Esther’s Diary in 2010) and Deeper and Deeper (2010), the latter starring Emmy-winning actor David Lago. All three of the films have also been released on DVD.

Bright Shining City Productions' other media productions include:

- The soundtrack CD of the film Deeper and Deeper (2010), featuring songs by vocalist and television personality Mandy Lauderdale and orchestration by Rick DeJonge.
- Pola Negri: Legenda Hollywood (2011), a Polish-language Pola Negri biography released in Poland by Prosynski Media and the recipient of "Book of The Year" and "Book of the Month" awards in the biography category from the Polish publication Ksiazki magazyn literacki (Books Literary Magazine).
- The 3-DVD set Pola Negri: The Iconic Collection (2011), which featured restored versions of Pola Negri's silent films The Polish Dancer (1917), The Yellow Ticket (1918), The Eyes of the Mummy (1918), and Sappho (1921). The set was picked up for distribution by Emphasis Entertainment in 2012.
