= Church in Ruins =

- True Detective episode
- Episode no.: Season 2 Episode 6
- Directed by: Miguel Sapochnik
- Written by: Nic Pizzolatto; Scott Lasser
- Cinematography by: Nigel Bluck
- Editing by: Alex Hall; Byron Smith
- Original air date: July 26, 2015
- Running time: 59 minutes

Guest appearances
- Christopher James Baker as Blake Churchman; Chris Kerson as Nails; Jon Lindstrom as Jacob McCandless; Michael Hyatt as Katherine Davis; Afemo Omilami as Police Chief Holloway; Leven Rambin as Athena Bezzerides; Abigail Spencer as Gena Brune; Sprague Grayden as Joyce; Austin Chase as Mikey; Josh Clark as Deiffenbach; Timothy V. Murphy as Osip Agranov; C. S. Lee as Attorney General Richard Geldof; Michael Adler as Cliggot; Andy Mackenzie as Ivar; Brett Rice as Mr. Wyman; Bill Kalmenson as Sheriff Russo; Trevor Larcom as Chad Velcoro; Vinicius Machado as Tony Chessani; Joseph Gatt as Bogden; Marco Rodríguez as Gena's Rapist; Bianca Taylor as Psychologist; Miranda Rae Mayo as Vera Machiado; Linda DeMetrick as Madame; Eva Pepaj as Girl #1; Erin Spencer as Girl #2; Jamie VanDyke as Girl #3; Benjamín Benítez as Gonzales #1; Robert Renderos as Gonzales #2; Joshua Chang as Tech; Rodger Halston as Hippy; Miguel Izaghirre as Dealer; Peter Katona as Ranger

Episode chronology
← Previous "Other Lives"	Next → "Black Maps and Motel Rooms"
- True Detective (season 2)

"Church in Ruins" is the sixth episode of the second season of the American anthology crime drama television series True Detective. It is the 14th overall episode of the series and was written by series creator Nic Pizzolatto and Scott Lasser, and directed by Miguel Sapochnik. It was first broadcast on HBO in the United States on July 26, 2015.

The season is set in California, and focuses on three detectives, Ray Velcoro (Colin Farrell), Ani Bezzerides (Rachel McAdams) and Paul Woodrugh (Taylor Kitsch), from three cooperating police forces and a criminal-turned-businessman named Frank Semyon (Vince Vaughn) as they investigate a series of crimes they believe are linked to the murder of a corrupt politician. In the episode, Velcoro, Bezzerides and Woodrugh start their next move in the undercover operation. Meanwhile, Semyon attempts to provide financial support for one of his deceased henchmen.

According to Nielsen Media Research, the episode was seen by an estimated 2.34 million household viewers and gained a 1.0 ratings share among adults aged 18–49. The episode received generally positive reviews from critics, who praised Sapochnik's directing, performances, and character development, although some felt that the pacing and lack of progress may not properly conclude all storylines.

== Plot ==
Entering the house, Velcoro (Colin Farrell) confronts Semyon (Vince Vaughn) for giving him the wrong man as his ex-wife's rapist, assuming he used the opportunity to keep Velcoro indebted to him. Semyon states that he believed the man was truly the rapist at the time and even suggests Velcoro was already corrupt before he asked him for the tip. Semyon warns Velcoro not to pursue him for the incident as it will only bring repercussions, with both men aiming their guns at each other beneath the kitchen table. Before leaving, Velcoro asks Semyon to get him the man who tipped him off, which Semyon says he will do, as long as Velcoro retrieves the missing hard drives that were stolen from Caspere's home.

As the authorities investigate the shed at Guerneville, Woodrugh (Taylor Kitsch) follows up on the missing blue diamonds. He discovers that they were part of a cache stolen during a double homicide and robbery of a jewelry store in the 1992 Los Angeles riots, which orphaned two children.

Meanwhile, Semyon and Jordan (Kelly Reilly) visit Stan's widow, Joyce, intending to provide some financial support for his family. Joyce reveals that Blake (Christopher James Baker) visited her on the day of Stan's funeral and intimidated her for information. Semyon also talks with Stan's son to help him move on from his father's death. Later, Semyon tortures a Mexican thug for the whereabouts of a drug cartel. He strikes a deal with the cartel to help find Irina Rulfo, Ledo Amarilla's girlfriend (Cesar Garcia) and the woman who pawned Caspere's watch, as long as the cartel is allowed to move drugs through Semyon's clubs.

Velcoro visits his ex-wife Gena's (Abigail Spencer) real rapist (Marco Rodríguez) in prison, and, after confirming the encounter, promises to eventually kill him. He later spends time with Chad (Trevor Larcom) in a supervised visit, but the encounter feels uncomfortable as they need a social worker to be present with them at all times. After the visit is over, Velcoro returns to his house, where he starts binge drinking and snorting cocaine, breaking his two-month sobriety. He then calls Gena, explaining he will drop the custody battle and will not see Chad ever again, as long as Gena promises to never tell Chad about his true parentage. She agrees to his terms.

Semyon finally contacts Irina, who claims that she stole Caspere's properties but only because she was hired by a man to do so. She describes the man as thin, white, and either a current or former police officer. Despite hesitating, she agrees to meet with Semyon for more information. When Semyon and his henchmen arrive at the location, they discover Irina has been murdered, with the cartel revealing themselves from the shadows. The cartel states that they will maintain their partnership with Semyon and that they killed Irina for fraternizing with the police.

With Woodrugh and Velcoro watching from outside of a secluded Guerneville mansion, Bezzerides (Rachel McAdams) infiltrates a secret elite party, posing as her sister Athena (Leven Rambin). Before meeting the hosts, they are all given MDMA to consume. As Bezzerides wanders throughout the orgy-filled mansion, she starts hallucinating just as a man begins flirting with her, and spots Tony Chessani (Vinicius Machado), Osip Agronov (Timothy V. Murphy), Jacob McCandless (Jon Lindstrom), Attorney General Richard Geldof (C. S. Lee), and Vinci police chief Holloway (Afemo Omilami).

During this, Woodrugh inspects the area and catches Osip and McCandless in a back room discussing a partnership, with McCandless praising Osip for his involvement in the rail project. After they leave, Woodrugh enters the office and retrieves some documents.

As she is led through the mansion witnessing the orgy, Bezzerides hallucinates a childhood memory of an older man complimenting and taunting her. Running to the bathroom, she vomits up the drugs in a panic. As she recovers, she discovers a heavily inebriated Vera (Miranda Rae Mayo) slumped in the bathroom corner, and resolves to escape with Vera from the mansion.

As patrons and security guards attempt to grab Bezzerides, she stabs them, which leads to the death of one of the guards. They rendezvous with Woodrugh just as more guards are deployed to catch them. Running through the woods, Velcoro arrives in the car, and the group leaves together as guards shoot at them. While Velcoro drives, Woodrugh tells them that the recovered documents point to a bigger conspiracy in the rail project.

== Production ==
=== Development ===
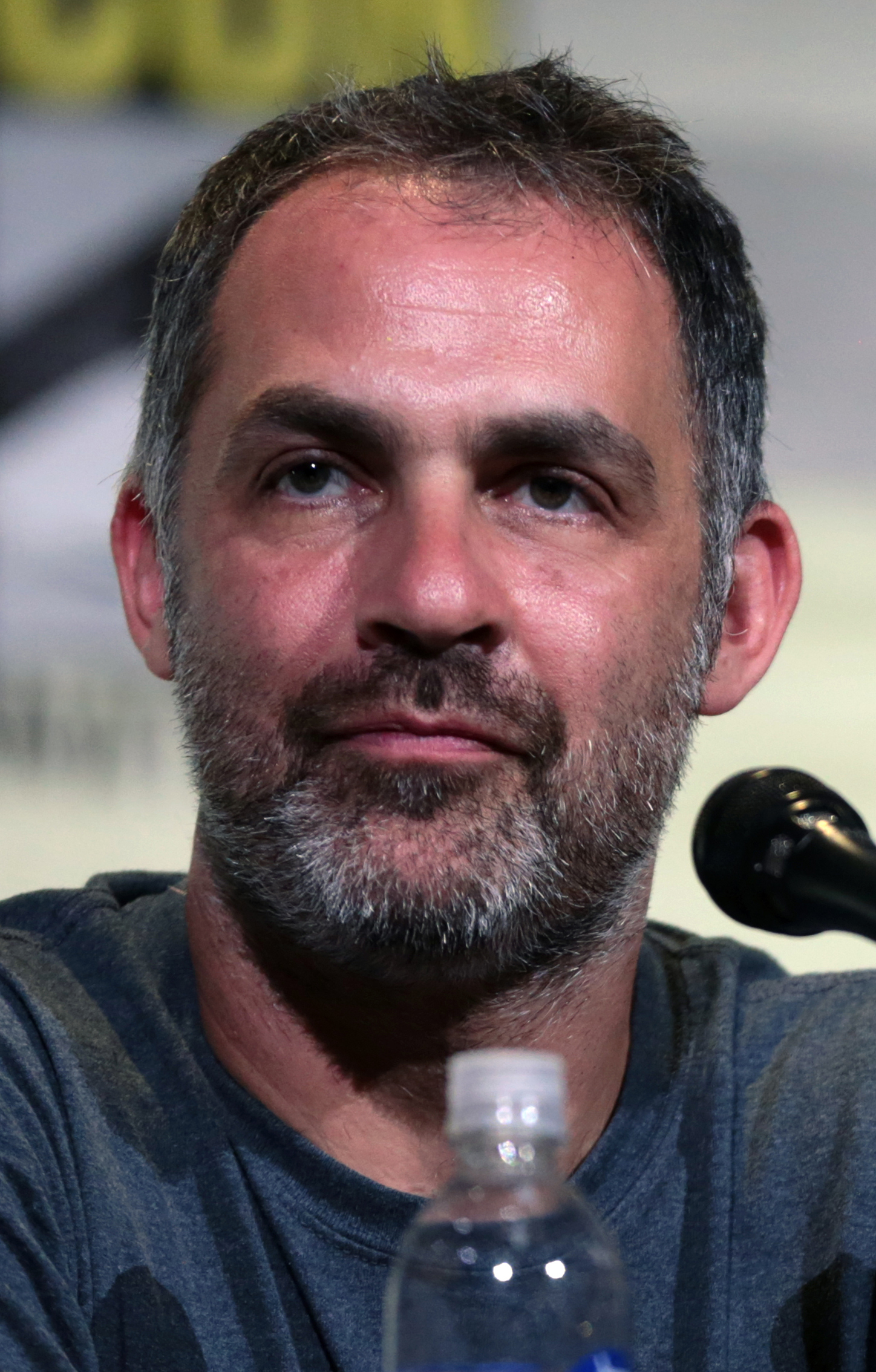
Miguel Sapochnik directed the episode.

In June 2015, the episode's title was revealed as "Church in Ruins" and it was announced that series creator Nic Pizzolatto and Scott Lasser had written the episode while Miguel Sapochnik had directed it. This was Pizzolatto's fourteenth writing credit, Lasser's second writing credit, and Sapochnik's first directing credit.

== Reception ==
=== Viewers ===
The episode was watched by 2.34 million viewers, earning a 1.0 in the 18-49 rating demographics on the Nielson ratings scale. This means that 1 percent of all households with televisions watched the episode. This was a slight decrease from the previous episode, which was watched by 2.42 million viewers with a 1.0 in the 18-49 demographics.

=== Critical reviews ===
"Church in Ruins" received positive reviews from critics. The review aggregator website Rotten Tomatoes reported a 75% approval rating for the episode, based on 24 reviews, with an average rating of 7.26/10. The site's consensus states: "A nightmarish scene with Rachel McAdams and a strong performance from Vince Vaughn stand out in 'Church in Ruins', an episode that still suffers from the flaws of True Detective's overarching story in season two."

Matt Fowler of IGN gave the episode a "great" 8.3 out of 10 and wrote in his verdict, "While still not coming close to Season 1's intrigue, business has picked up in the second half of True Detective's Season 2. I even feel like this could all get wrapped up with a bow in one more episode, but, alas, there are two. So I'm not exactly sure what's going to take precedence - the land-grab deal or the individual problems of the main characters?"

Emily L. Stephens of The A.V. Club gave the episode a "B−" grade and wrote, "It's not the philosophical ramble or drawn-out character study of season one. It's a tumble of smut and poison and muddled mystery, a pulpy mess. And it's finally winding up the line that's been playing out all season. It feels like the second season of True Detective is getting to know itself a little bit, or like it knew itself all along and just didn't know it did."

Alan Sepinwall of HitFix wrote, "When you balance the two sides out, there were more individual elements to feel positive about, but the completely inert nature of the mystery remains an enormous problem, even when the performances or direction have moments to shine. Better, but still True Detective season 2." Gwilym Mumford of The Guardian wrote, "This straightforward episode, bookended by two great set pieces, is the easiest to digest so far. But there are still an awful lot of loose ends to tie up." Ben Travers of IndieWire gave the episode a "B" grade and wrote, "One of the problems plaguing True Detective Season 2 has been over-emphasis. Whether you spot it in the writing, direction or line delivery, things have been a little too buy-the-book. For everything that worked about 'Church In Ruins' — and most of it did — there were very few surprises along the way to bolster the well-executed suspense."

Jeff Jensen of Entertainment Weekly wrote, "'Church in Ruins' was the first episode of True Detective this season that I enjoyed from start to finish without much reservation since episode 2. Maybe TV recapping Stockholm Syndrome is kicking in and I'm starting to fall for my captors, but Vince Vaughn's pretentious don't-call-him-a-gangster gangster didn't leave me too bothered or baffled with his pretentious patter, while Colin Farrell's Ray Velcoro didn’t make me laugh when he talked outrageously tough." Aaron Riccio of Slant Magazine wrote, "Less is more, and while True Detective must eventually start providing some of the answers to the many questions it has presented over the first two thirds of the season, it can surely find a more subtle, realistic way to do so."

Kenny Herzog of Vulture gave the episode a 3 star rating out of 5 and wrote, "We're getting closer to some version of the truth as it pertains to Caspere's killer, but the tone of this noir fantasy is increasingly, resolutely bitter. The integrity of that jewelry-store heist back in ’92 was compromised, no different from the death shack Paul and Ani stumbled on up in the forest. No different from how the abuse Ani suffered at her commune or what Paul endured in Afghanistan has been that thing that’s torn them in two, how Ray's actions following Gena's assault have ravaged his conscience, or how parental neglect lead Frank to nihilism as a means of survival. It's no different, for that matter, from the riots themselves splitting Los Angeles in such a fashion that the haves may as well have cloistered themselves off in mansions with Eastern bloc hookers and cocaine while everyone else was left to ruthlessly claim what's theirs. Really, True Detective isn't any one character or city populous's world. It's just the world." Tony Sokol of Den of Geek gave the episode a 4.5 star rating out of 5 and wrote, "'Church in Ruins' found missing person, but it doesn't solve a thing. Hands down, this is the best episode so far in a series that's apparently still warming up."

Carissa Pavlica of TV Fanatic gave the episode a 3.5 star rating out of 5 and wrote, "The best thing about this hour was the slight change in pace, switching up the music and letting our characters break out of what has become their standard operating procedure. They should have done it a lot sooner." Ronnie Stiernberg gof Paste gave the episode a 6.5 out of 10 and wrote, "And that, ultimately, remains True Detective's biggest problem: too many hamfisted backstories, not enough insight as to what exactly is going on and why we're supposed to care. With just two episodes left, it's time for this convoluted plot to get resolved, but is a satisfying ending even a possibility at this point, if the most compelling aspect of the show is a dropped paternity suit?"
