= Shelley Calene-Black =

American voice actress

- Born: Fort Worth, Texas, U.S.
- Other name: Eileen Dover
- Education: University of Houston
- Occupation: Voice actress
- Years active: 1998–present
- Agent: Pastorini-Bosby Talent

Shelley Calene-Black (/kəˈliːn/ kə-LEEN) is an American voice actress who has provided voices for a number of English-language versions of Japanese anime films and television series. Her leading voice roles include Mireille in Noir, Kyou Fujibayashi in Clannad, Rutile in Land of the Lustrous, Medaka Kurokami in Medaka Box, Hamyuts Meseta in The Book of Bantorra and Hime in Princess Resurrection. In live-action films, she played the lead role of Maria Patterson in the Mariusz Kotowski-directed Holocaust film Esther's Diary.

== Biography ==
Calene-Black was born and raised in Texas. She studied theatre at the University of Houston and worked on stage in New York City. After returning to Houston, she worked on local theatre groups such as the Alley Theatre and Stages Repertory Theatre.

== Filmography ==
=== Anime ===
List of voice performances in anime
| Year | Title | Role | Notes | Source |
|---|---|---|---|---|
| 1998 | Those Who Hunt Elves | Celcia Maria Claire | | |
| 2000 | Gensomaden Saiyuki | Yaone | | |
| 2001 | Orphen | Cleao Everlasting | | |
| 2001 | Rune Soldier | Melissa | | |
| 2003 | Noir | Mireille Bouquet | | |
| 2004 | Gravion | Tessera | | |
| 2004 | Parasite Dolls | Chieko | Ep. 1 | |
| 2005–2007 | Elfen Lied | Shirakawa | | |
| 2007 | Princess Resurrection | Hime | | |
| 2008 | Rosario + Vampire | Ririko Kagome | | |
| 2008 | Sekirei | Takami Sahashi | | |
| 2010 | Clannad | Kyou Fujibayashi | | |
| 2010 | Legends of the Dark King: A Fist of the North Star Story | Sakuya | | |
| 2011 | Highschool of the Dead | Yuriko Takagi | Ep. 8, 10-12 | |
| 2011 | Demon King Daimao | Fujiko Eto | Credited as Eileen Dover in the English dub cast announcements | |
| 2012 | The Book of Bantorra Inu x Boku SS | Hamyuts Meseta | | |
| 2012 | Tokyo Magnitude 8.0 | Mari Kusakabe | | episode credits |
| 2013 | La storia della Arcana Famiglia | Sumire | | |
| 2013 | Battle Girls: Time Paradox | Nobunaga Oda | | |
| 2013 | Log Horizon | Henrietta | | |
| 2013 | Medaka Box | Medaka Kurokami | | |
| 2013 | Nakaimo - My Sister is Among Them! | Kanoko Mikadono | | |
| 2014 | From the New World | False Minoshiro | | |
| 2014 | Majestic Prince | Rin Suzukaze | | |
| 2014 | WataMote | Mrs. Kuroki | | |
| 2014 | Sunday Without God | Anna | | |
| 2014 | Cross Ange | Zola Axberg | | |
| 2015 | Akame ga Kill! | Najenda | | |
| 2015 | Is It Wrong to Try to Pick Up Girls in a Dungeon? | Ais Wallenstein | | |
| 2016 | Gate | Misalie | | |
| 2016 | Wizard Barristers | Ageha Chono | | |
| 2017 | Monster Musume | Kuroko Smith | | |
| 2017 | Is It Wrong to Try to Pick Up Girls in a Dungeon? Sword Oratoria | Ais Wallenstein | | |
| 2018 | Flip Flappers | Mimi | | |
| 2018 | Haikyuu!! | Madoka Yachi | | |
| 2018 | Made in Abyss | Lyza | | |
| 2019 | Land of the Lustrous | Rutile | | |
| 2019–2020 | My Youth Romantic Comedy Is Wrong, As I Expected | Mrs. Yukinoshita | | |
| 2020 | BanG Dream! | Rei Wakana/LAYER | Season 2 | |
| 2020 | The Pet Girl of Sakurasou | Ayano Iida | | |
| 2020 | The Demon Girl Next Door | Seiko Yoshida | | |
| 2020 | Shirobako | Mari Tateo/Mrs Yasuhara | | |
| 2021 | Kandagawa Jet Girls | Manatsu Shiraishi | Credited as Eileen Dover | |
| 2021 | Babylon | Flora Lowe | | |
| 2022 | The Executioner and Her Way of Life | Archbishop Orwell | | |
| 2022 | Iroduku: The World in Colors | Haruka Aoi | | |
| 2023 | Farming Life in Another World | Graffaloon | | |
| 2023 | The Dangers in My Heart | Ichikawa's Mother | | |
| 2023 | Phantom of the Idol | Shinano | | |
| 2024 | The Most Heretical Last Boss Queen | Rosa | | |
| 2024 | My Instant Death Ability Is So Overpowered | Asaka | | |
| 2025 | Plus-Sized Elf | Ooeda | | |
| 2025 | 2.5 Dimensional Seduction | Mayuri Hanyu | | |
| 2025 | Flower and Asura | Shura | | |
| 2025 | Rock Is a Lady's Modesty | Headmistress | | |

=== Film ===
List of voice performances in feature film
| Year | Title | Role | Notes | Source |
|---|---|---|---|---|
| 2001 | Saiyuki: Requiem | Yaone | | |
| 2011 | Fullmetal Alchemist: The Sacred Star of Milos | Miranda | | |
| 2013 | Fairy Tail the Movie: Phoenix Priestess | Coordinator | | |

List of voice performances in direct-to-video and television film
| Year | Title | Role | Notes | Source |
|---|---|---|---|---|
| 2012 | Gintama: The Movie | Otose, Mitsuba Okita, Tae Shimura | | |
| 2012 | Trails in the Sky OVA | Scherazard | | |

=== Live action ===
List of acting performances in film and television
| Year | Title | Role | Notes | Source |
|---|---|---|---|---|
| 2008 | Forgiveness a.k.a. Esther's Diary | Maria Patterson | | |
| 2018 | The Purge (Season 2) | Joanne Gardner | | |
