= C. B. Powell =

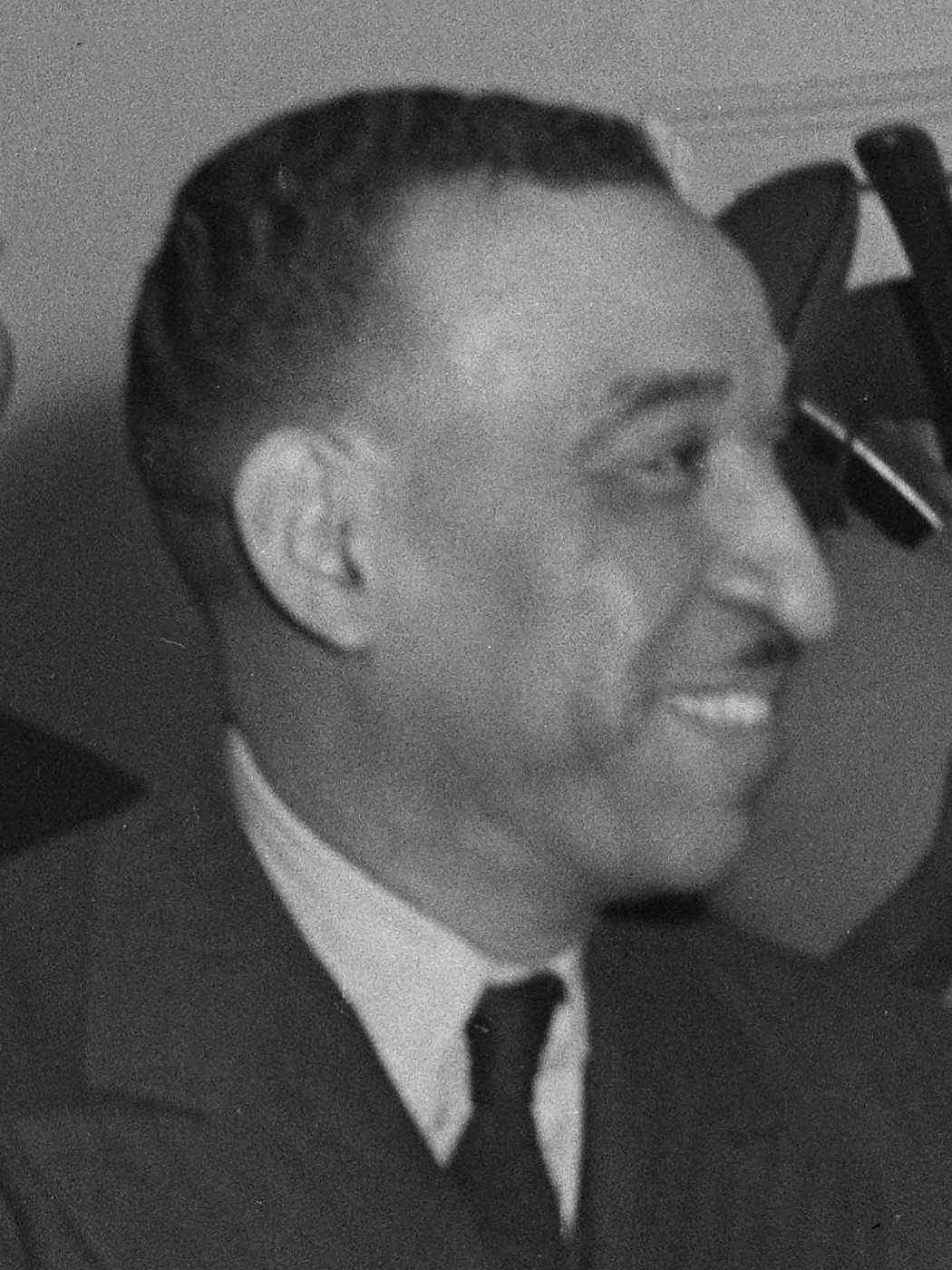
Powell in 1943

Clilan Bethany Powell (August 8, 1894 – September 22, 1977) was an American businessman who served as publisher of the Amsterdam News.

== Early life and medical career ==
Powell was born on August 8, 1894, in Newport News, Virginia. He received his medical degree from Howard University College of Medicine in 1920 and served his internship at Bellevue Hospital. He was a member of the staff of Harlem Hospital for 8 years and started his private practice in New York City in 1921. He was one of the first African-American doctors to specialize in X-rays and ran an X-ray practice in Harlem for 25 years.

== Business career ==
In 1922, Powell helped found the Victory Mutual Life Insurance Company, a black-owned life insurance company led by Anthony Overton. He became first vice president of the company in 1934 and was promoted to president in 1940 following the death of Lacey Kirk Williams. In 1936, The Chicago Defender credited Powell with turning the company around. Powell also served as the president of the Community Personal Finance Corporation (a personal loan provider) and the Brown Bomber Bread Company and owned four funeral homes.

In 1936, Powell and Dr. Philip M. H. Savory purchased the Amsterdam News at bankruptcy auction. They paid $5,000 and agreed to take on over $30,000 of the paper's $42,000 debt. According to Powell, they acquired the paper chiefly to promote their other businesses. In 1959, Savory and Powell signed a Buy–sell agreement which allowed Powell to take full ownership of the paper upon Savory's death in 1965. In 1971 he sold the paper to a group led by Percy Sutton and Clarence B. Jones.

In 1940, Powell was nominated for president of the Negro National League. After a three-week deadlock between the supporters of Powell and incumbent President Tom Wilson, Alex Pompez was able to negotiate an agreement between the two sides that saw Wilson and the other league officers retain their jobs.

== Politics ==
Powell was an outspoken Democrat and his paper backed Franklin D. Roosevelt in the 1936 United States presidential election. During the 1936 and 1940 United States presidential elections, Powell served as the publicity director for the Negro Division of the Democratic National Committee. He left the Democratic party over the issue of Racial segregation in the United States Armed Forces and his belief that a Republican administration offered more hope for African-American advancement. In 1943, Republican Thomas E. Dewey appointed Powell to the New York State Athletic Commission. He was the first African-American and the first physician to ever serve on the commission. As an athletic commissioner, Powell supported cracking down on boxers who delayed accepting challenges for their titles and promoters who associated with known criminals. During the 1944 United States presidential election he served as assistant publicity directory for the Dewey-Bricker campaign.

== Death ==
Powell died on September 22, 1977, at his home in Briarcliff Manor, New York. He was survived by his wife, Lena Dukes Powell. He was buried in Kensico Cemetery.
