= Hal (2013 film) =

- Film poster

Japanese name
- Kana: ハル
Transcriptions
- Revised Hepburn: Haru
- Directed by: Ryōtarō Makihara
- Written by: Izumi Kizara
- Produced by: George Wada
- Starring: Yoshimasa Hosoya; Yōko Hikasa
- Cinematography: Koji Tanaka
- Edited by: Aya Hida
- Music by: Michiru Oshima
- Production companies: Pony Canyon; Production I.G. Wit Studio; Shochiku
- Distributed by: Shochiku
- Release date: June 8, 2013
- Running time: 60 minutes
- Country: Japan
- Language: Japanese

Hal (Japanese: ハル, Hepburn: Haru) is a 2013 Japanese animated film produced by Wit Studio and directed by Ryōtarō Makihara. It was released in Japan on June 8, 2013.

== Synopsis ==
The story takes place in a technologically advanced society where robots can be programmed to behave like a human. After a tragic plane accident, a robot, known as Q01, is sent to a small Japanese town to help a person who just lost a loved one. While trying to heal the melancholic heart, the past of the couple is unearthed.

== Voice cast ==
Character	Japanese	English
Hal	Yoshimasa Hosoya	Chris Burnett
Kurumi	Yōko Hikasa	Bryn Apprill
Ryu	Mamoru Miyano	Todd Haberkorn
Aranami	Shinpachi Tsuji	Bill Flynn
Tokio	Tamio Ōki	Grant James
Tsukiko	Ako Mayama	Pam Dougherty
Erika	U-ko Tachibana	Juli Erickson
Rumiko	Yono Hikari	Linda Leonard
Mami	Shōko Tsuda	Laurie Steele
Nepalese	Ikki	Mike McFarland

== Production and release ==
The original film was revealed in the January 2013 issue of Shueisha's Bessatsu Margaret magazine. Ryōtarō Makihara directed the film, with Izumi Kizara writing the film's script, and manga artist Io Sakisaka providing the original character designs. The film was released in Japan on June 8, 2013. Yōko Hikasa performed the theme song "Owaranai Uta" (Unending Poem).

In July 2013, Funimation announced that they had acquired rights for a North American release.

=== Manga adaptation ===
A manga adaptation by Umi Ayase was serialized in Bessatsu Margaret in 2013 and compiled into one volume.

== Reception ==
Theron Martin of Anime News Network gave the film a B+ rating. In his review, he felt the film wasn't long enough to deliver its emotional impact but did give credit to its soft and understated score, quality artistic effort and well-cast English dub, concluding that "If you're looking for a low-key romantic tale and don't mind a big chunk of gimmickry, this one should fit the bill."
