= Omega Station =

- True Detective episode
- Episode no.: Season 2 Episode 8
- Directed by: John Crowley
- Written by: Nic Pizzolatto
- Cinematography by: Nigel Bluck
- Editing by: Chris Figler; Byron Smith
- Original air date: August 9, 2015
- Running time: 86 minutes

Guest appearances
- Ritchie Coster as Mayor Austin Chessani; Ronny Cox as Catalast Executive; Fred Ward as Eddie Velcoro; Rick Springfield as Dr. Irving Pitlor; Abigail Spencer as Gena Brune; James Frain as Lieutenant Kevin Burris; Timothy V. Murphy as Osip Agronov; Chris Kerson as Nails; Andy Mackenzie as Ivar; Afemo Omilami as Police Chief Holloway; Yara Martinez as Felicia; Solomon Shiv as Michael Bulgari; C. S. Lee as Richard Geldof; Alain Uy as Ernst Bodine; Agnes Olech as Veronica Chessani; Jon Lindstrom as Jacob McCandless; Trevor Larcom as Chad Velcoro; Courtney Halverson as Laura Osterman; Luke Edwards as Lenny Tyler; Lera Lynn as Singer; Lolita Davidovich as Cynthia Woodrugh; Adria Arjona as Emily; Jack Topalian as Armin; Arthur Darbinyan as Leonid; Stevin Knight as Dan Howser; Mark Chaet as Jew Diamond Dealer; Vinicius Machado as Tony Chessani; Emily Rios as Betty Chessani; Matt Battaglia as Commander Floyd Heschmeyer; Cooper Huckabee as Frank's Father; Liberte Chan as News Reporter; Jesse Mitchell as Youth #1; Koby Kumi-Diaka as Teen Gangster; Benjamin Schrader as Man; Benjamín Benítez as Gonzales #1; Robert Renderos as Gonzales #2

Episode chronology
← Previous "Black Maps and Motel Rooms"	Next → "The Great War and Modern Memory"
- True Detective (season 2)

"Omega Station" is the eighth episode and season finale of the second season of the American anthology crime drama television series True Detective. It is the 16th overall episode of the series and was written by series creator Nic Pizzolatto, and directed by John Crowley. It was first broadcast on HBO in the United States on August 9, 2015.

The season is set in California, and focuses on three detectives, Ray Velcoro (Colin Farrell), Ani Bezzerides (Rachel McAdams) and Paul Woodrugh (Taylor Kitsch), from three cooperating police forces and a criminal-turned-businessman named Frank Semyon (Vince Vaughn) as they investigate a series of crimes they believe are linked to the murder of a corrupt politician. In the episode, Velcoro and Bezzerides partner with Semyon in order to take down their enemies in a last stand.

According to Nielsen Media Research, the episode was seen by an estimated 2.73 million household viewers and gained a 1.2 ratings share among adults aged 18–49. The episode received mixed-to-negative reviews from critics; the writing, resolution to the main mystery, lack of emotional stakes, pacing, and anticlimactic ending were criticized, with many deeming it a disappointing season, although some praised the performances and Crowley's directing.

== Plot ==
After having sex, Velcoro (Colin Farrell) and Bezzerides (Rachel McAdams) discuss their problems. Bezzerides recalls her childhood victimization at the hands of a stranger. Velcoro recalls when he confronted Gena's supposed rapist and then killed him.

Semyon (Vince Vaughn) asks Jordan (Kelly Reilly) to leave for Barquisimeto in Venezuela with Nails (Chris Kerson). Jordan refuses to leave him but he convinces her he will see her in two weeks, telling her to meet him in the local Obelisk with a white dress while he wears a white suit with a rose. He bids both Jordan and Nails farewell as they leave. He later visits Chessani (Ritchie Coster) at his mansion, only to discover him dead in the pool. He questions Veronica (Agnes Olech) about it, and he insinuates that Tony (Vinicius Machado) was involved in his murder. He calls Osip (Timothy V. Murphy) to threaten him and settles down at a bunker at the Black Rose to map out his plan, with the help of Felicia (Yara Martinez).

Velcoro calls Woodrugh (Taylor Kitsch), only to be answered by Burris (James Frain), who was with the police as they take his corpse. Velcoro knows he is involved and Burris suggests meeting up. Knowing that he will be blamed for his death, Velcoro and Bezzerides deduce that Laura (Courtney Halverson), Caspere's secretary, and Lenny (Luke Edwards), a photographer from the movie set of the stolen prop car, as possible suspects in Caspere's death. They visit their house, finding the bird mask, weapons and pictures of many officers, including Burris and Holloway (Afemo Omilami). They also discover Laura, handcuffed to the fireplace. She confesses to meeting Tony, who put her to work with Caspere. She also admits that Lenny is responsible for Caspere's death, intending to meet with Holloway to trade the hard drive (which has been erased) for money in the new train station at Anaheim (ARTIC).

Bezzerides takes Laura to a bus station, telling her to go to Seattle for a new life. Velcoro goes to the train station at Anaheim to meet with Lenny, confronting him for shooting him and his incoming plan. As Holloway shows up, Velcoro shows him and they sit on a bench, with Lenny behind them, but with Burris nearby. Using a wire, Velcoro claims to have the hard drive and demands the diamonds, also having him reveal his involvement in Amarilla's death and his partnership with Tony. Holloway then claims that Laura was Caspere's illegitimate daughter, prompting an angry Lenny to attempt to stab him, only to be shot by Burris. Bezzerides, who arrived at the location, also starts shooting but in the chaos, the crowd steps on the wire, destroying their evidence and forcing her and Velcoro to escape. Lenny then stabs Holloway until both are gunned down by law officials.

Velcoro and Bezzerides take refuge with Semyon at his bunker. While talking to Bezzerides, Semyon tells her she should leave for Barquisimeto and deliver a message to Jordan. Semyon suggests to Velcoro to strike back at their enemies and he decides to do it. Velcoro and Semyon then intercept a Catalast meeting at a cabin in the woods and they kill everyone, including Osip and McCandless (Jon Lindstrom). They also steal $12 million, which they equally split, and they part ways, intending to meet in Barquisimeto.

Bezzerides informs Velcoro that Dr. Pitlor (Rick Springfield) has been killed and both agree to meet soon. He then drives to meet with Chad (Trevor Larcom) at school, where he is overjoyed to see him with his father's police badge. Chad notices him and they both salute and silently exchange a look at each other before he leaves. He returns to his car, discovering that hitmen have put a transponder. Instead of removing it, he drives off with the car as he is being followed by a black SUV. Meanwhile, Semyon is intercepted by the Mexican cartel and is driven to an unknown location.

Realizing that his fate is sealed, Velcoro calls Bezzerides, telling her to leave for Venezuela, lying that he will see her soon. He then privately talks to Felicia, telling her that he will die but she must make sure that Bezzerides leaves, and she agrees to do it. Semyon is taken to the desert, where the cartel bosses are angry for the clubs' destruction. He offers $1 million for his life, which the cartel accepts; before leaving a cartel member demands Frank's suit, which contains $3.5 million worth of diamonds. He refuses and punches a member of the cartel, but is stabbed and left alone in the desert. Bleeding, he starts walking his way back to civilization. Meanwhile, Bezzerides leaves the city in a bus, then leaves for a boat.

While driving through the woods, Velcoro leaves a phone message to Chad but the signal loss prevents the message from being sent. He leaves the vehicle and his share of the money behind just as the black SUV catches up with him. He escapes through the woods while being followed by Burris and hitmen. He kills some of them and prepares for one last stand, but is gunned down by Burris and his henchmen. He left back his phone, which didn't send the phone message. Back at the desert, Semyon is haunted by hallucinations of his father and childhood bullies, who taunt him. He then sees an hallucination of Jordan in a white dress, who tells him he died some time ago. He turns back and sees his corpse in the ground, his walk part of the hallucination. Accepting his fate, he drops dead to the ground.

In the aftermath, Eddie (Fred Ward) is disheartened to see the media report Velcoro's death. Gena (Abigail Spencer) finally receives the results of her paternity test, which states that Velcoro was Chad's biological father. Woodrugh has a highway named after him, with Emily (Adria Arjona), Cynthia (Lolita Davidovich) and his baby attending. Tony Chessani is named Mayor of Vinci, while elected Governor Richard Geldof (C. S. Lee) inaugurates the California High-Speed Rail Authority, which goes as planned.

Some time later, in Barquisimeto, Bezzerides speaks with Dan Howser (Stevin Knight), (Note: The journalist whom Velcoro assaulted in "The Western Book of the Dead".) recounting on all the events that happened and provides with all incriminating evidence, including Caspere's case files. Howser tries to convince her to testify in court but she declines. She leaves for a room, revealing that she lives with Jordan and her son, who is also Velcoro's son. They leave the room, joining Nails outside. They walk through the crowd, until they disappear.

== Production ==
=== Development ===
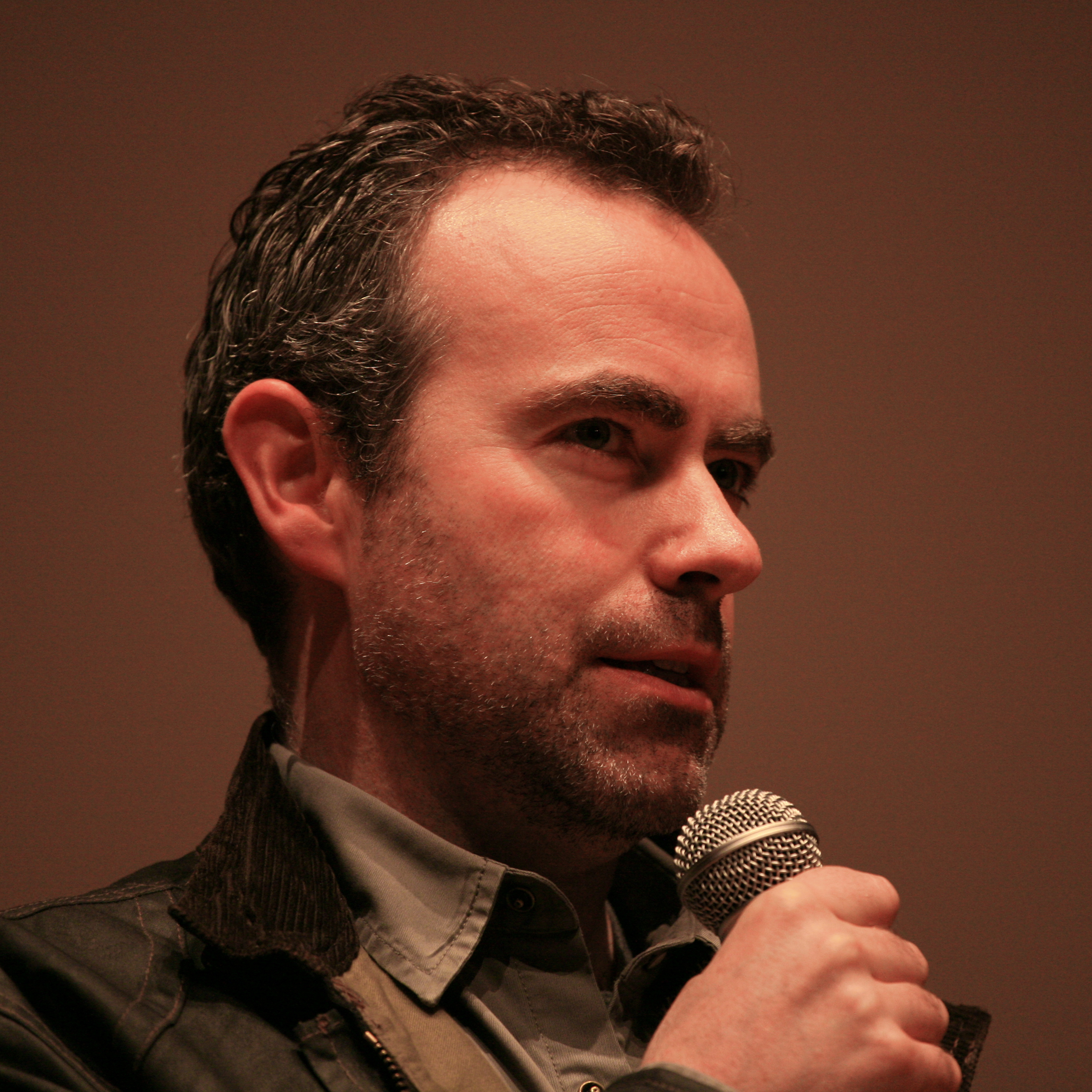
John Crowley directed the episode.

In June 2015, the episode's title was revealed as "Omega Station" and it was announced that series creator Nic Pizzolatto had written the episode while John Crowley had directed it. This was Pizzolatto's sixteenth writing credit, and Crowley's second directing credit.

== Reception ==
=== Viewers ===
The episode was watched by 2.73 million viewers, earning a 1.2 in the 18-49 rating demographics on the Nielson ratings scale. This means that 1.2 percent of all households with televisions watched the episode. This was a 25% increase from the previous episode, which was watched by 2.18 million viewers with a 1.0 in the 18-49 demographics. But it was a 23% decrease from the previous season finale, which was watched by 3.52 million viewers with a 1.6 in the 18-49 demographics.

=== Critical reviews ===
"Omega Station" received mixed-to-negative reviews from critics. The review aggregator website Rotten Tomatoes reported a 31% approval rating for the episode, based on 36 reviews, with an average rating of 5.84/10. The site's consensus states: "A disappointing ending to a disappointing season, 'Omega Station' was packed with incident but ultimately failed to tie together the many narrative strands of True Detective's second incarnation."

Alan Sepinwall of HitFix wrote, "'Omega Station' was all the sins of season 2 writ large. It offered long swaths of action that made little sense, followed by awkward exposition dumps. It was self-serious to the point of self-parody. The characters were so sketchily written that there was almost no impact when several of them died."

Gwilym Mumford of The Guardian wrote, "The formulaic tropes that plagued the second season continue right into the bloody finale, and many questions have been left unanswered." Ben Travers of IndieWire gave the episode a "C−" grade and wrote, "After spending seven weeks weighing each episode on this scale — murder mystery vs. character study — it turns out True Detective Season 2 was neither. For it to be a mystery, audiences would have needed to enjoy piecing together the clues, rather than waiting for missing bits of exposition to drop heavily during long-winded back-and-forths. While there were times the rampant confusion over what was happening on True Detective was overblown, it would be hard to argue anyone was engaged with the mystery for the right reasons. In the end, it was a simple case of revenge and everything surrounding it was just filler thrown in to add unfounded complexity. In other words, Season 2 was filled with poorly chosen red herrings, and what did matter lacked the dramatic heft of better stories."

Jeff Jensen of Entertainment Weekly wrote, "An ambitious, busted season comes to a bleak, unfulfilling conclusion." Aaron Riccio of Slant Magazine wrote, "True Detective's first season had a methodical and measured approach to tracking its villain, but this season doesn't know when to stop changing things up."

Brian Lowry of Variety wrote, "Despite rallying marginally at the end, the encore to the acclaimed limited series that paired Matthew McConaughey and Woody Harrelson proved a major disappointment – not just compared to the original, but on its own turgid terms. It's hard to say if the concept is mortally wounded – the beauty of self-contained series, beyond opening casting doors, is the opportunity to start from scratch – but ultimately, this was to film noir what bad imitation Hemingway is to Hemingway." Sean T. Collins of Rolling Stone wrote, "True Detective creator Nic Pizzolatto delivered a frustrating finale that tried to have its catharsis cake and mute it too. He allowed many of its main characters to go down in an unironic blaze of glory, then insisted it was all more or less pointless. A show that has spent its entire existence straddling both sides of the self-parody line just doesn't have the control required to pull off that contrast. It felt like a celebration of macho genre nonsense rather than an examination of it. After eight-plus hours of aimlessly cruising around the California noir freeway, it’s high time we headed for the exit ramp."

Shane Ryan of Paste gave the episode a 4.8 out of 10 and wrote, "The beautiful mess is over, and the tumbling, changeable dice that is True Detective season two landed more on 'mess' than 'beautiful' in last night's finale." Kenny Herzog of Vulture gave the episode a 3 star rating out of 5 and wrote, "This iteration of True Detective as a whole oriented, disoriented, and then reoriented us to its environment and ethos with lurid detours into genre storytelling and sobering cause and effect on real lives. It wasn't always coherent, and it could be unintentionally comical, but it's hard not to walk away having received the message that if we don't want more Vincis to take root and prosper, it is indeed time to wake up."

Not all reviews were negative. Matt Fowler of IGN gave the episode a "great" 8.5 out of 10 and wrote in his verdict, "True Detective's second season certainly contained a lot. To both admire and chastise, I suppose. Did so many heroes fall this year because Season 1's cops survived? Or was it because that's the end result of this type of sprawling, nesting doll noir? No happy endings. No defeating the hydra. Because, overall, the villain is human corruption and greed. I'm very glad that last week's episode made big strides, character-wise, because I did feel actively invested in most everyone's survival. Something I probably couldn't have said halfway through the season. A solid, somber finish to a shaky season."

Emily L. Stephens of The A.V. Club gave the episode a "B+" grade and wrote, "This last episode of True Detective's second season doesn't redeem the confusion that came before, and even as a strong chapter in a weak season, it trips over itself several times. But it packs a potency that will linger."

Tony Sokol of Den of Geek gave the episode a 4 star rating out of 5 and wrote, "True Detective's 'Omega Station' runs out of steam before it runs out of track. It keeps a good pace, but the ticket never gets punched." Carissa Pavlica of TV Fanatic gave the episode a 3.5 star rating out of 5 and wrote, "True Detective Season 2 wasn't a win. With an absolutely stellar cast, there wasn't anything that could be done with a story gone bad or editing that ran amok. Hopefully some lessons were learned here that won't be repeated. The franchise should carry on. Many series suffer sophomore slumps and power on. True Detective will, too. It's just a shame that the cast wasn't given more to work with."
