= Fred Parker Jr. =

American actor

- Born: 1980 (age 45–46); San Antonio, Texas, U.S.
- Education: University of Texas (BA)
- Occupation: Actor
- Website: Official website

External image
- Parker in April 2014

Fred Parker Jr. (born 1980) is an American film, television, and stage actor. He is known for his stage performances in The Best Man and Damage Control, both in 2012.

== Early life and education ==
Born and raised in San Antonio, Texas, he attended the Northside Independent School District, where he wanted to become an actor at the age of 12. When he was in junior high, he won University Interscholastic League (UIL) acting awards for his role in Hamlet. He also won numerous National Forensic League awards in prose, poetry, and duet acting.

He went on to attend the University of Texas at Austin, where he received a bachelor of arts in theatre and dance. In college, he performed in plays such as As You Like It, and Vieux Carre. In 2012, he took four levels of improvisation training with the Upright Citizens Brigade Theatre in Hollywood, and has worked with acting coach Marco Perella.

== Career ==
=== Film ===
In 2009, Parker's first film appearance was in From Mexico with Love as Jakes' Lackey, an uncredited role. He then went on to have small parts in the film Deeper and Deeper (2010) and in the TV series 90210 (2010).

In October 2014, Parker was announced to play country music singer Faron Young in the then-upcoming biopic about Hank Williams (played by Tom Hiddleston) titled I Saw the Light. The film was set to release sometime in 2015.

=== Theatre ===
In 2011, Parker became friends with playwright Gore Vidal, who introduced Parker to theatre director Michael Wilson. Parker was then cast as Howie Annenberg in Vidal's play The Best Man directed by Wilson in 2012, alongside James Earl Jones and John Larroquette. Parker has also performed in the off-Broadway play Damage Control as Chip Donahue.

== Personal life ==
Parker is a member of the Screen Actors Guild.

== Filmography ==
Year	Title	Role	Notes
2009	From Mexico with Love	Jakes' Lackey	Uncredited
2009	Plans	Lucas	Short film
2009	Doctor S Battles the Sex Crazed Reefer Zombies	Elevator Zombie	
2010	Deeper and Deeper	Customer #2	
2010	90210	Tuxedoed Waiter	TV series (Episode: "Holiday Madness")
2012	The Eves	John	
2015	Bigger Than the Beatles	Bobby Beausoleil	
2015	I Saw the Light	Faron Young	
