= Allan Knee =

American dramatist

Allan Knee is an American film and television writer and playwright who authored the following:

== Stage ==
- Little Women (Broadway musical) (2005)
- The Man Who was Peter Pan (42nd Street Workshop 'Off-Broadway. (March 1998)
- Late Nite Comic (Broadway) (1987)
- Santa Anita '42 (Off-Broadway; 1974)

== Film and television ==
- Esther's Diary (2010), a Holocaust film directed by Mariusz Kotowski
- Finding Neverland (2004) (screenplay by David Magee was based on Knee's play, The Man Who Was Peter Pan)
- The Scarlet Letter (1979 mini-series)
