= Securities offering =

Discrete round of investment

A securities offering (or funding round or investment round) is a discrete round of investment, by which a business or other raises money to fund operations, expansion, a capital project, an acquisition, or some other business purpose.

== Components of a round ==
Hallmarks of an offering include the following (though none are an absolute requirement in every circumstance):

- A prospectus, private placement memorandum, or other document used to advertise the availability and terms of the offering, and to provide disclosure of information investors will need for their due diligence efforts
- A securities filing with relevant state and/or federal regulators
- Various contracts and documents by which the securities are sold such as a subscription agreement, a stock purchase agreement, and a convertible note (which documents a type of convertible security) or other loan document
- Various subsidiary or related agreements such as a buy-sell agreement, investor rights agreement, proxy agreements, and proposed amendments to a company's articles of incorporation
- Underwriters, stockbrokers, finders, and/or agents who help sell and otherwise facilitate the investment transaction.
- Financial projections, financial statements, and projections and promises regarding the use of funds.

== Types of rounds ==
Rounds are often described according to the nature of investors, the size of investment, and the stage of the enterprise.

- Pre-seed and seed rounds (also called "friends and family" rounds) are used to launch an enterprise
- Angel rounds are early investments by angel investors.
- Venture rounds are large ($1M-$30M) investments led by venture capital firms. These are often denoted by the series of stock sold, e.g. "A round," "B round" and so on. The name of the round suggests the stage in the company's growth. A company that reaches a "D" or "E" round without achieving some success raises concerns; a company that has been through a major restructuring may renumber its series, e.g. an "AA round" or an "A' round." Informally, these rounds might be termed a "first round,"second round," and so on.
- A mezzanine round is late stage private funding, meant to carry a company over until a public offering or major merger or acquisition

Because there are no public exchanges listing their securities, private companies meet venture capital firms and other private equity investors in several ways, including warm referrals from the investors' trusted sources and other business contacts; investor conferences and symposia; and summits where companies pitch directly to investor groups in face-to-face meetings, including a variant known as "Speed Venturing", which is akin to speed-dating for capital, where the investor decides within 10 minutes whether s/he wants a follow-up meeting.

Some specialized rounds include:

- A down round is an investment that is at a lower price per share (or unit) than a previous round. This may trigger the dilution protection provisions, if any, of contracts with earlier investors.
- A bridge loan is a relatively small investment, short of a full-scale investment round, to help a company that would otherwise run out of money.
- A cram down is an investment in a struggling company by which the company's earlier investors and other owners are bought out entirely at a discounted price, or the value and terms of their securities are greatly reduced.
- Public offerings are rounds of investments sold to the public and listed on a securities exchange rather than sold to a limited group of investors. An initial public offering is the first such offering by which a formerly private company "goes public."

Offerings may be limited or open-ended. If limited, there is a cap on the number of investors, duration of the round, amount of money raised, number and nature of people to whom the offering is made, and/or the number of shares sold (if it is an equity offering). The offering is ended and the securities are granted at one or more closings. When securities issuances happen from time to time rather than one or several discrete dates, it is sometimes known as a "rolling closing."

A single round usually involves multiple investors buying a company's securities in a distinct time period, at the same price and terms, for a single financial purpose. When multiple investments are close in price and terms, they are "merged" according to securities laws (in other words, they are treated as a single round under the law).

Rounds may have one or more lead investors who negotiate and enforce the terms of the agreement. These are usually the parties with the greatest sophistication, resources, reputation, and/or connection to the investment. There may or may not be other follow-on or silent investors who participate in the round. One other distinction is between public offerings for public companies, which are widely advertised and subscribed, and private offerings made by private companies, which have strict limits on the number and nature of the potential investors.

In the United States most offerings are regulated under the Securities Act of 1933.

== See also ==
- Private equity
- Public offering
- Investment
- Corporate finance
- List of finance topics
- Securities Act of 1933
