= Juli Erickson =

American voice actress (1939–2025)

- Born: December 4, 1939; Colton, California, U.S.
- Died: December 17, 2025 (aged 86); Spokane, Washington, US
- Occupation: Voice actress
- Years active: 1980–2018
- Spouse: Grant James (married 1986; died 2022)

Juli Erickson (December 4, 1939 – December 17, 2025) was an American voice actress. Her earliest film appearance was a minor role in Michael Cimino's Heaven's Gate. She went on to appear in live-action roles in Matlock and Walker: Texas Ranger, and starred as the Pola Negri-influenced character Apollonia Kowalski in the Mariusz Kotowski-directed Holocaust film Esther's Diary (2010).

Erickson also had a long list of English language anime voiceover credits. Some of her notable anime appearances include the English dub of the hit manga series Fullmetal Alchemist as Pinako Rockbell, and an appearance in the feature film Evangelion: 1.0 You Are (Not) Alone. She also voices Tsuru and Kokoro in One Piece, Ogen in Basilisk, Setsu in Samurai 7, and Shima in Ouran High School Host Club. On October 26, 2018, Erickson was announced to have retired from voice acting, with her recurring roles recast. Erickson died on December 17, 2025, at the age of 86.

== Filmography ==
=== Anime ===
- Basilisk – Iga Ogen
- BECK: Mongolian Chop Squad – Tamayo
- Birdy the Mighty: Decode – Yoshie Suzuki
- Case Closed – Kathleen Neighbers, Nonee
- D.Gray-man – Old Woman (Eps. 16–17), Spider Akuma (Ep. 42)
- Deadman Wonderland – Miyako
- Eden of the East: Paradise Lost – Toshiko Kitabayashi
- El Cazador de la Bruja – Bucho's Wife (Ep. 5)
- Eureka Seven: AO – Naru's Grandmother
- Fafner in the Azure: Heaven and Earth – Ikumi Nishio
- Fairy Tail – Ohba Babasama (Ep. 154–263)
- Fractale – Priestess (Ep. 3)
- Fullmetal Alchemist series – Pinako Rockbell (Winry's Grandmother)
- Gosick – Roxanne (Eps. 1, 3)
- Hal – Erika
- Hell Girl – Ai's Grandmother
- Hero Tales – Innkeeper (Ep. 3)
- Kamisama Kiss – Demon Hag (Ep. 1)
- Kodocha – Ms. Sakaki (Ep. 35), Shizuka Kurata
- Lupin the Third: The Woman Called Fujiko Mine – Old Woman (Ep. 5), Aisha's Mother (Ep. 13)
- Mushishi – Tama (Ep. 20)
- My Bride Is a Mermaid – Nagasumi's Grandmother
- My Hero Academia – Recovery Girl (Season 1 only)
- One Piece – Tsuru, Amazon, Kokoro, Additional Voices
- One Piece Film: Z – Tsuru
- Ouran High School Host Club – Shima Maezono (Eps. 10, 26)
- Overlord – Lissy Balear
- Pandora in the Crimson Shell: Ghost Urn – Anna
- Panty & Stocking with Garterbelt – Panty's Granny (Ep. 13A)
- Samurai 7 – Setsu (Kirara's Grandmother)
- Selector Infected WIXOSS series – Hatsu Kominato
- Shiki – Tae Yano
- Strike Witches series – Yoshiko Akimoto (Yoshika's Grandmother)
- Toriko – Setsuno

=== Film ===
- Halloween: The Night Evil Died – Pamela Strode

== Live action ==
- Forgiveness a.k.a. Esther's Diary – Apollonia
