= Rendezvous (2019 film) =

- Film Poster
- Directed by: Seth Kozak
- Written by: Seth Kozak
- Produced by: Seth Kozak
- Starring: Katarina Morhacova, Chris Kerson, Mike Sutton, David Lago, Francis Jue
- Cinematography: Michael Cole
- Edited by: Bob Kovacs
- Music by: Anthony Marsh
- Release date: 19 November 2019
- Running time: 15 minutes
- Country: United States
- Language: English

Rendezvous is an American suspense-thriller short film, written, directed, and produced by Seth Kozak. The film follows the journey of Catalina Wright, played by Katarina Morhacova, as she encounters fatal arrangements made by her politician husband.

The film was released on November 19, 2019.

== Plot ==
A New Hampshire Congressman attempts to clean-up his darker side in preparation for brighter opportunities in politics. Arrangements with a foreign specialist are made to off his much younger wife, while he is away on business. The scheme is suddenly threatened when she changes her weekend plans, opting to visit her mother in Maine. When icy road conditions limit her travel, she takes refuge in an historic inn. However, the instinct that pushed her toward safety may have betrayed her, as she suspects the inn's only other resident is a man hired to kill her.

== Cast ==
- Katarina Morhacova as Catalina Wright
- Chris Kerson as Art (Hitman)
- Mike Sutton as Congressman Zachary Wright
- David Lago as Police Officer
- Francis Jue as Chris (Estate Caretaker)
- Casey McDougal as Inn Clerk #1
- Lisa Boucher Hartman as Inn Clerk #2

== Production ==
=== Pre-production ===
The treatment for Rendezvous was developed while writer, Seth Kozak, was serving in Iraq in 2003. The screenplay for Rendezvous received multiple awards and nominations from film festivals (2013-2014), giving it traction to launch the production. The script received accolades from WorldFest Houston, the Beverly Hills Film Festival, The Indie Gathering, and the Bare Bones International Film Festival.

During the initial crowdfunding campaign, the project gained the attention of IndieWire and was given the distinction of "Project of the Day." Kozak teamed with Damian Veilleux and Michael Cole of Catharsis Pictures, a Waterville, Maine-based production company, while on a diplomatic assignment with the U.S. Embassy in Bucharest, Romania.

Producers used the Kickstarter crowdfunding platform. The campaign achieved 162% of its funding goal. A total of 83 official backers endorsed the picture through the site. Notable backers include Kjell Lindgren, and Alex Vindman.

=== Casting and filming ===
International actress and model, Katarina Morhacova, was offered the lead role after wrapping her performance in Claudia La Bianca's feature The Journey of a Dragonfly. Corbin Bernsen was originally attached to play the role of Congressman Zachary Wright. The role was eventually recast with Mike Sutton. David Lago has a supporting role as a police officer. Chris Kerson was cast as the hitman. Francis Jue plays Chris, an executive butler-type.

Producers collaborated virtually between Romania and Maine to shoot the first half of the film during April 2014. After the initial shoot, Catharsis departed the project causing it to be shelved for three-and-a-half years. With a new team, Kozak was able to get cameras rolling again in the Fall of 2017. Locations in Stafford, Virginia and Villanova, Pennsylvania were used to shoot Lear Jet and mansion interiors. In November 2018, a three-day shooting schedule picked up the remaining shots in Maine and New Hampshire.

=== Post-production ===
Bob Kovacs edited the film in Annandale, Virginia. Special effects editing was worked by Daria Liubimova in Russia and Robert Pilko in Israel. LA-based colorist, Adrian DeLude, of Company 3, mastered the color grading.

Anthony Marsh of Production Station sound design services in Australia, developed the music score and conducted the film's sound design and sound editing. The soundtrack includes the song "Running Up That Hill", by the British alternative rock band Placebo. Howard Pearl was a consultant on the film.

== Reception ==
=== Critical response ===
Jolly Moel, of Screen Critix, gave Rendezvous 4/5 stars on the merits of its film noir classicism. The film received an average reviews from other film critics. Film Threat called her performance "a highlight of the film," regarding it as the foundation that held the other performances together.

Rendezvous was an official selection to more than 25 international film festivals in eight countries. The film was selected to screen in the 53rd WorldFest Houston International Film Festival. IT was an official selection to the 21st Bare Bones International Film Festival, receiving a nomination for Best Short Romance. Lead actress Katarina Morhacova was recognized with multiple awards.

=== Accolades ===
List of awards and award nominations
Festival/Event	Category	Award	Result
53rd WorldFest Houston International Film Festival	Best Short Suspense-Thriller	Platinum Remi	Won
21st Bare Bones International Film Festival	Best Romance Short	Gold Medal	Nominated
Pre-production awards and nominations
14th Beverly Hills Film Festival	Best Screenplay	Golden Palm Award	Nominated
15th Bare Bones International Film Festival	Best Short Screenplay	Bronze Medal	Won
46th WorldFest Houston International Film Festival	Best Short Screenplay	Silver Remi	Won

=== Official festival selections ===
Festival/Event	Country
21st Bare Bones International Film Festival	USA
53rd WorldFest Houston International Film Festival	USA
