= The Best Man (play) =

1960 play by Gore Vidal

- Original language: English
- Written by: Gore Vidal
- Subject: Five men vie for their party's nomination for president.
- Genre: Drama
- Setting: A presidential convention, Philadelphia, 1960

Premiere
- Date: March 31, 1960
- Place: Morosco Theatre; New York City

The Best Man is a 1960 play by American playwright Gore Vidal. The play premiered on Broadway in 1960 and was nominated for six Tony Awards, including Best Play. Vidal adapted it into a film with the same title in 1964.

Lee Tracy, playing Art Hockstader, repeated his performance in the 1964 film adaptation.

== Summary ==
At the Presidential nominating convention in the summer of 1960 in Philadelphia, Secretary of State William Russell lives by his principles, but is haunted by recent health problems that threaten his career and vote-winning potential. Senator Joe Cantwell presents himself as the people's candidate; his determination to win at all costs is also his great flaw. Cantwell is faced with the revelation of sexual indiscretions, threatening both his marriage and his career. These two frontrunners for their party's presidential nomination fight for the support of the outgoing president and resort to mudslinging in a very public contest.

== Cast and characters ==
Character	Broadway debut (1960)	Broadway revival (2000)	2nd Broadway revival (2012)
Ex-President Art Hockstader	Lee Tracy	Charles Durning	James Earl Jones
Mrs. Sue-Ellen Gamadge	Ruth McDevitt	Elizabeth Ashley	Angela Lansbury
Secretary William Russell	Melvyn Douglas	Spalding Gray	John Larroquette
Alice Russell	Leora Dana	Michael Learned	Candice Bergen
Senator Joseph Cantwell	Frank Lovejoy	Chris Noth	Eric McCormack
Mabel Cantwell	Kathleen Maguire	Christine Ebersole	Kerry Butler
Sheldon Marcus	Graham Jarvis	Jonathan Hadary	Jefferson Mays
Dick Jensen	Karl Weber	Mark Blum	Michael McKean
Senator Clyde Carlin	Gordon B. Clarke	Ed Dixon	Dakin Matthews

== Productions ==
The play opened on Broadway at the Morosco Theatre on March 31, 1960, and ran for 520 performances before closing on July 8, 1961.

The play starred Melvyn Douglas (William Russell) and Frank Lovejoy (Joseph Cantwell). On October 2, 1962, Lovejoy died of a heart attack in his sleep at his residence in New York City. Lovejoy and his wife, Joan Banks, had been appearing in a New Jersey production of the play.

A revival opened on Broadway at the Virginia Theatre in September 2000, and closed on Dec 31, 2000 after 121 performances and 15 previews. Directed by Ethan McSweeny, the play starred Elizabeth Ashley, Charles Durning, Christine Ebersole, Spalding Gray, Michael Learned, Chris Noth, Mark Blum, Jonathan Hadary and Jordan Lage.

A revival opened on Broadway at the Gerald Schoenfeld Theatre on March 6, 2012 in previews and officially on April 1, 2012, in a limited run.

The revival was originally scheduled to close on July 1, 2012 but was extended to September 9, 2012. The cast starred James Earl Jones (as former President Art Hockstader), Angela Lansbury, John Larroquette (as candidate William Russell), Candice Bergen, Eric McCormack (as candidate Senator Joseph Cantwell), Jefferson Mays, Michael McKean, Fred Parker Jr. and Kerry Butler, with direction by Michael Wilson. This production was nominated for two 2012 Tony Awards: Best Revival of a Play and Best Performance by an Actor in a Leading Role in a Play (Jones). Theatre review aggregator Curtain Critic gave the production a score of 75 out of 100 based on the opinions of 13 critics. John Stamos, Cybill Shepherd, Kristin Davis, and Elizabeth Ashley took over the roles originally held by McCormack, Bergen, Butler, and Lansbury in July 2012. Angelica Page played Catherine (secretary and mistress to Larroquette's William Russell) before assuming the lead role of Alice Russell when Cybill Shepherd unexpectedly left the show.

In 2017, acclaimed stage and TV actor Martin Shaw starred as Russell in the UK premier and tour of the play, with Jack Shepherd, Gemma Jones, Glynis Barber, Honeysuckle Weeks and Jeff Fahey as Cantwell. The production received favourable reviews and its relevance to modern political machinations was commented on in the light of the 2016 US presidential election.

== Response ==
=== Political reaction ===
At the time, it was widely recognized that the play was written as a deliberate parallel of the upcoming 1960 Democratic Convention. The play also seemed to be a scathing attack on the Kennedys whom Vidal detested and also something of a tribute to Adlai Stevenson whom Vidal admired and supported. The principal characters in the play represent Vidal's then view of the main players in the Democratic Party, only with different names.

Vidal's main character and hero, the very patrician and intellectual William Russell, is an homage to Adlai Stevenson. The other character, the despicable Senator Joe Cantwell, represents Vidal's view of Kennedy, as well as Richard Nixon (whom Vidal also detested), Joseph McCarthy and Estes Kefauver, all of whom—like Cantwell—rose to national prominence via publicity-seeking Senate investigative committees. (Cantwell even specifically mentions hearings into the Mafia, similar to those in which Kefauver and both Kennedys had participated.) The rumors of homosexuality in Joe Cantwell's past also parallel rumors about Joe McCarthy.

Joe Cantwell campaigns on the need to close "The Missile Gap" with the USSR, which was a major Kennedy campaign claim (which was completely fictional; despite Sputnik, in terms of strategic missiles the US was well ahead of the Soviets at the time). In an ironic and prophetic similarity to Nixon, Cantwell has secretly decided to open relations with Red China if elected, while playing up his anti-Communism in public. The ex-President, Art Hockstader, whose endorsement both candidates are fighting for is a send-up of Harry Truman, although his quip when downing a shot of Bourbon - "Striking a blow for Liberty!" - was a Prohibition-era salute that was a favorite saying of Vice President John Nance Garner.

=== Critical reviews ===
In his review of the original 1960 Broadway play for The New York Times, Brooks Atkinson wrote that the play is a "political melodrama that comes close enough to the truth to be both comic and exciting" and that Vidal "knows how to put together a plot that is both amusing and engrossing."

== Awards and nominations ==
=== Original Broadway production ===
Year	Award	Category	Nominee	Result	Ref.
1960	Tony Awards	Best Play	Gore Vidal	Nominated	
1960	Tony Awards	Best Actor in Play	Melvyn Douglas	Won	
1960	Tony Awards	Best Actor in Play	Lee Tracy	Nominated	
1960	Tony Awards	Best Featured Actress in a Play	Leora Dana	Nominated	
1960	Tony Awards	Best Direction of a Play	Joseph Anthony	Nominated	
1960	Tony Awards	Best Scenic Design of a Play	Jo Mielziner	Nominated	

=== 2001 Broadway revival ===
Year	Award	Category	Nominee	Result	Ref.
2001	Tony Award	Best Revival of a Play	The Best Man	Nominated	
2001	Drama Desk Award	Outstanding Revival of a Play	The Best Man	Won	
2001	Outer Critics Circle Award	Outstanding Revival of a Play	The Best Man	Won	
2001	Outer Critics Circle Award	Best Actress in a Play	Michael Learned	Nominated	
2001	Outer Critics Circle Award	Featured Actor in a Play	Charles Durning	Nominated	
2001	Theatre World Award		Chris Noth	Won	

=== 2012 Broadway revival ===
Year	Award	Category	Nominee	Result	Ref.
2012	Tony Award	Best Revival of a Play	The Best Man	Nominated	
2012	Tony Award	Best Actor in a Play	James Earl Jones	Nominated	
2012	Drama Desk Award	Outstanding Revival of a Play	The Best Man	Nominated	
2012	Drama Desk Award	Outstanding Featured Actress in a Play	Angela Lansbury	Nominated	
2012	Drama Desk Award	Outstanding Sound Design of a Play	John Gromada	Won	
2012	Drama League Award	Distinguished Revival of a Play		Nominated	
2012	Outer Critics Circle Awards	Outstanding Revival of Play	The Best Man	Nominated	
2012	Outer Critics Circle Awards	Outstanding Featured Actor in a Play	James Earl Jones	Won	
2012	Outer Critics Circle Awards	Outstanding Featured Actress in a Play	Angela Lansbury	Nominated	
