= Deeper and Deeper (film) =

- Directed by: Mariusz Kotowski
- Written by: Cyndi Williams
- Story by: Mariusz Kotowksi
- Produced by: Mariusz Kotowksi; Gilda Longoria
- Starring: David Lago; Cyndi Williams; LisaMarie Lamendola
- Cinematography: Leon Rodriguez
- Edited by: Brian Burrowes
- Music by: Rick DeJonge
- Production company: Bright Shining City Productions
- Release date: April 26, 2010 (Polish Film Festival)
- Running time: 93 minutes
- Country: United States
- Language: English

Deeper and Deeper is a 2010 American erotic psychological thriller written by Cyndi Williams and directed by Polish-American filmmaker Mariusz Kotowski.

== Plot ==
When bank teller Ryan (David Lago) meets beautiful but icy business executive Angelica (LisaMarie Lamendola) he becomes instantly infatuated with her. He stumbles upon the perfect opportunity to spy on her when he is hired by Dolores (Cyndi Williams) as a part-time maintenance man and moves into an apartment across the street from Angelica. He uses his position and his apartment's view to start spying on her, and slowly inserts himself into Angelica's life. Angelica turns on him and Ryan slits his wrists in the bathtub in despair. When items from Ryan's apartment begin explicitly appearing in Angelica's apartment, Dolores becomes suspicious of Angelica, especially when Angelica visits the apartment building and produces a memento from Dolores' late son.

== Cast ==
- David Lago as Ryan
- Cyndi Williams as Dolores
- LisaMarie Lamendola as Angelica
- Drew Waters as John
- Jennifer Finley as Jenny
- Ashley Rene-Hallford as Devin
- John Finan as Mr. Collins
- Sydney Barrosse as Robyn
- Kristi Jennings as Elena
- Ben Leffler as Matthew
- Mamie Meek as Mrs. Jenkins
- Karl Kabler as The Concierge

== Background ==
Mariusz Kotowski first met Williams when researching locations in San Antonio, Texas, and while visiting Austin searching for a narrator for the film Pola Negri: Life is a Dream in Cinema. Their meeting eventually led to Kotowski and Williams partnering to create Deeper and Deeper. Casting began in April 2008 for a planned 4-week shoot. The film's lead actor is Daytime Emmy Award-winning actor David Lago, who is best known for playing the character Raul Guittierez in the daytime soap opera The Young and the Restless and for his recurring role in the family drama television series 7th Heaven.

Kotowski's previous directorial credits include the narrative Holocaust film Esther's Diary and Pola Negri: Life is a Dream in Cinema, a biographical documentary about the life of silent film star Pola Negri.

== Release and recognition ==
Deeper and Deeper premiered on April 26, 2010, at the Eleventh Annual Polish Film Festival of Los Angeles, California. The film received its debut screening in Austin, Texas at the Violet Crown Cinema on June 20, 2011.

The film was nominated for Best Director (Mariusz Kotowski), Best Actor (David Lago, Best Screenplay (Cyndi Williams), and Best Actress (LisaMarie Lamendola) at The World Music & Independent Film Festival, won Best Actor (David Lago) and received Honorable Mention for best Narrative Film at the Los Angeles Reel Film Festival, won First Place for best Suspense Thriller at the International Indie Gathering, and won bronze medal for Dramatic Feature in the 2010 JamFest Indie Film Festival Awards.

In 2010, Deeper and Deeper also won an Accolade Competition Award of Merit, an Indie Fest Award of Merit, and a Platinum EMPixx Award. The film since also been screened at the Bare Bones Festival and the 16th Annual Temecula Valley International Film and Music Festival in Temecula, CA.

=== Awards and nominations ===
- 2010, Won 'Best Actor' for David Lago at Los Angeles Reel Film Festival
- 2010, Won 'Honorable Mention' for 'Best Narrative Film' at Los Angeles Reel Film Festival
- 2010, Won First Place for 'Best Suspense Thriller' at International Indie Gathering
- 2010, Won bronze medal for 'Dramatic Feature' at JamFest Indie Film Festival
- 2010, Won 'Award of Merit' at Accolade Competition
- 2010, Won 'Award of Merit' at Indie Fest
- 2010, Won 'Platinum Award' at EMPixx Awards
- 2010, Nomination for 'Best Director' for Mariusz Kotowski at World Music & Independent Film Festival
- 2010, Nomination for 'Best Actor' for David Lago at World Music & Independent Film Festival
- 2010, Nomination for 'Best Screenplay' for Cyndi Williams at World Music & Independent Film Festival
- 2010, Nomination for 'Best Actress' for LisaMarie Lamendola at World Music & Independent Film Festival

== Soundtrack ==
Deeper and Deeper features an orchestral, jazz, and big band score largely composed and conducted by Rick DeJonge. In addition to the DeJonge-composed instrumental tracks, the soundtrack features four vocal tracks. Two, "Mister Stevens" and "Champagne, Champagne," feature jazz vocalist Mandy Lauderdale, who is best known for appearing in Reality TV show Temptation Island and on MTV's Total Request Live. The other two, "I Am a Dangerous Woman" and a vocal version of the Deeper and Deeper theme song, are performed by Sydney Barrosse, who appears in the music video for the vocal version of the Deeper and Deeper theme. Barrosse also appears as an actress in the film, playing Robyn, Angelica's business partner.
