= Grant James (voice actor) =

American actor (1935–2022)

- Born: Grant M. James; June 19, 1935; Medina, Ohio, U.S.
- Died: November 23, 2022 (aged 87); Spokane, Washington, U.S.
- Occupations: Actor, voice actor
- Years active: 1972–2018
- Spouse: Juli Erickson (m. 1986)

Grant M. James (June 19, 1935 – November 23, 2022) was an American actor and voice actor at Funimation and ADV films. His earliest TV appearance was on The Mysteries, a drama which ran from 1985 to 1986, as the role of Peter. He went on to appear in Walker, Texas Ranger, Tombstone, Barney’s Round and Round We Go, and Better Call Saul.

James had a long list of English-language Anime voiceover credits. He has voiced both Zeff and Pagaya in One Piece as well as roles in Detective Conan, Fullmetal Alchemist, and Dragon Ball Z.

He was married to fellow voice actor Juli Erickson, who died on December 17, 2025.

James died on 23 November 2022 at the age of 87.

== Voice roles ==
=== Anime ===
- Detective Conan
- Dragon Ball Z
- Fullmetal Alchemist (TV series)
- Final Fantasy: Unlimited - Fungus
- One Piece - Zeff and Pagaya
- Space Dandy - Pops
