= Mariusz Kotowski =

Polish-born writer and director

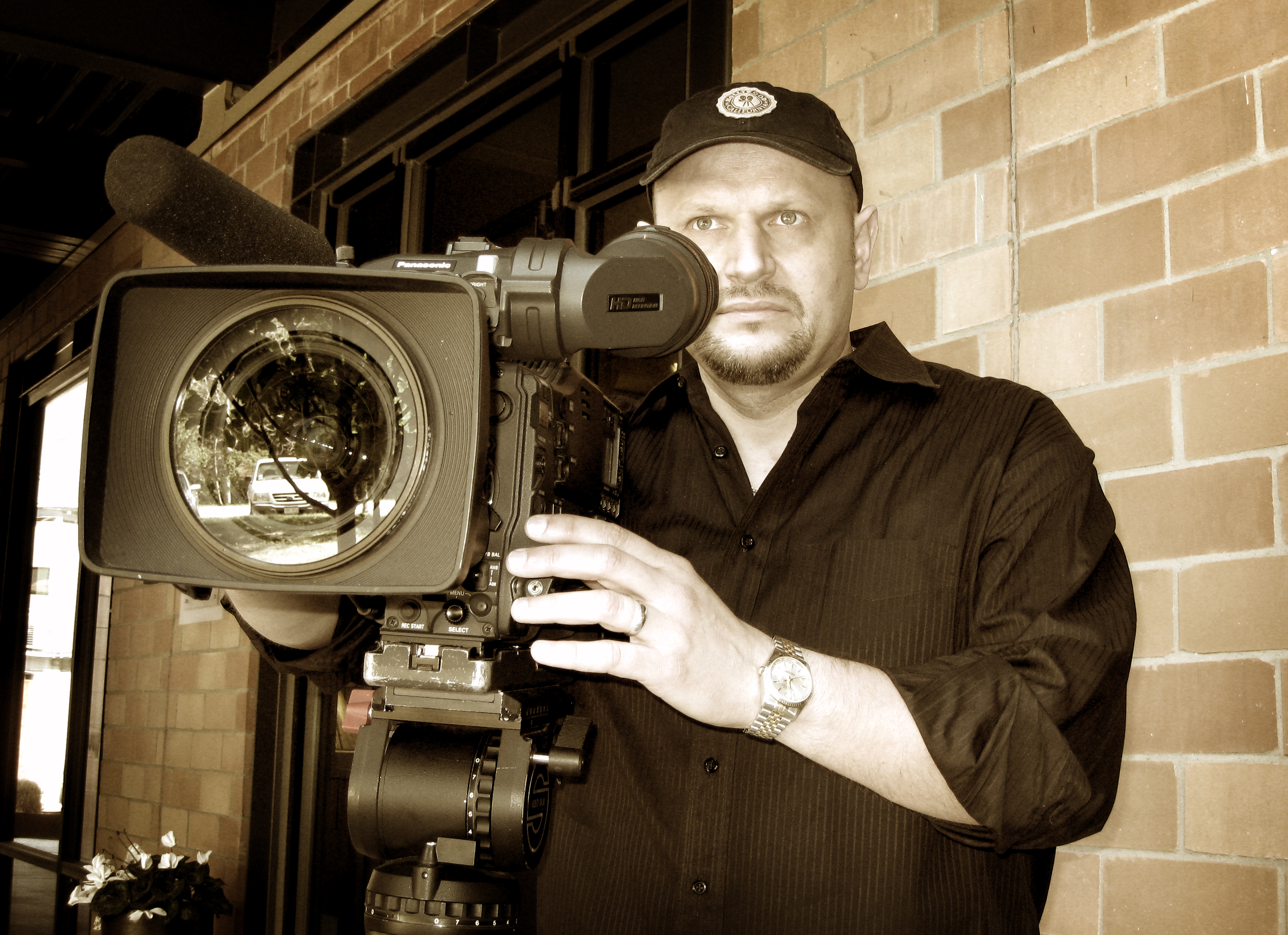
- Born: Olsztyn, Poland
- Citizenship: Polish-American
- Occupations: Writer, director
- Years active: 2004–present
- Notable work: Pola Negri: Life is a Dream in Cinema

Mariusz Kotowski is a Polish-born writer and director. As a director, he has gained a reputation for cinematic portrayals that are atypical of both Hollywood and independent film styles and that cleverly mix different film approaches into a cohesive whole.

To date, Kotowski's feature films include Pola Negri: Life is a Dream in Cinema (2006), a feature-length biographical documentary about the silent film actress Pola Negri; the Holocaust film Esther's Diary (2010), which was originally released in 2007 as Forgiveness; and Deeper and Deeper (2010), an erotic psychological thriller starring Emmy-winning actor David Lago. All of these films have been released by Kotowski's Austin-based production company Bright Shining City Productions.

Prior to the launch of his directorial career, Kotowski worked as a renowned dancer and dance choreographer. As a dancer, Kotowski has the distinction of being the first Polish citizen ever to receive the rare Triple Fellowship in dance from the Imperial Society of Teachers of Dancing in London.

== Biography ==
Mariusz Kotowski was born in the city of Olsztyn in northeast Poland. Kotowski's original inspiration to get into the arts came from watching Gene Kelly and Billy Wilder films on television. Kotowski made a decision at a young age to emigrate to America and become a movie director.

Initially Kotowski studied dance and dance choreography in Poland, and received a Master of Arts in Education before being accepted into Imperial Society of Teachers of Dancing in London. It was there that he became the first Polish citizen ever to receive the rare Triple Fellowship from the organization. Kotowski then moved to New York City 1988, working as a dancer, choreographer, and dance instructor by day and studying film directing at the NYU Film School by night.

Kotowski invested three years and a considerable personal fortune into researching and filming the documentary Pola Negri: Life is a Dream in Cinema, a biographical documentary about silent film actress Pola Negri. The film is notable for featuring extensive interviews with film stars Hayley Mills and Eli Wallach, who were starring actress and supporting actor respectively in Negri's final film The Moon-Spinners (1964). The film premiered on April 29, 2006 at Laemmle's Sunset 5 Theatre in Hollywood as part of the Seventh Annual Polish Film Festival of Los Angeles, The film went on to play festivals and Pola Negri retrospectives all over the United States and Europe, including screenings at the Museum of Modern Art (MoMA) in New York and La Cinémathèque Française in Paris.

Kotowski's next film was a dramatic film with a Holocaust-related subplot entitled Forgiveness (2007). The film was re-edited to more strongly emphasize the Holocaust story and retitled Esther's Diary (2010). The film's Holocaust narrative is inspired by real-life stories told to the director by his Polish grandparents, who were personally involved with hiding Polish Jews from the Nazis during World War II.

Kotowski's most recent film is the erotic psychological thriller Deeper and Deeper (2010). The film stars Daytime Emmy Award-winning actor David Lago (The Young and the Restless). Like its predecessor, Pola Negri: Life is a Dream in Cinema, the film made its premiere at Laemmle's Sunset 5 Theatre in West Hollywood, California, playing on April 26, 2010 at the Eleventh Annual Polish Film Festival of Los Angeles.

Kotowski authored a Polish-language biography of Pola Negri entitled Pola Negri: Legenda Hollywood (English title: Pola Negri: Hollywood Legend). The book was released in Poland on February 24, 2011, by Prosynski Media. The book won the "Book of The Year" and "Book of the Month" award in the biography category from the Polish publication Ksiazki magazyn literacki (Books Literary Magazine).

Also in 2011, Kotowski produced the 3-DVD set Pola Negri: The Iconic Collection, which features the Negri's Polish and German silent films Bestia (The Polish Dancer, 1917), Der Gelbe Schein (The Yellow Ticket, 1918), Die Augen der Mumie Ma (The Eyes of the Mummy Ma, 1918), and Sappho (1921). The films have been re-mastered, with intertitles translated into English and scored with original piano music composed and performed by Rick Dejonge. The DVD set was picked up for distribution by Emphasis Entertainment later in the year and reissued February 7, 2012.

The Golden Halo Award presented to Kotowski by the Southern California Motion Picture Council in 2010. In 2011, Kotowski received a Pola Negri Appreciation Award from the Pola Negri Cultural Society in Lipno (Lipnowskie Towarzystwo Kulturalne im. Poli Negri).

== Filmography ==
=== Feature films ===
- Pola Negri: Life is a Dream in Cinema (2006)
- Forgiveness (2007)
- Esther's Diary (2010, recut version of Forgiveness)
- Deeper and Deeper (2010)

=== Short films ===
- Tango on Broadway (2004)
- Luigi on Broadway (2004)
- Clara's Secret (2005)
- Pola Negri: Hollywood Legend (2006)
