= Forgiveness (2008 film) =

- Film poster as Esther's Diary
- Directed by: Mariusz Kotowski
- Screenplay by: Allan Knee
- Story by: Mariusz Kotowski
- Produced by: Gilda Longoria; Mariusz Kotowski
- Starring: Juli Erickson; Shelley Calene-Black; Sydney Barrosse; Jaime Goodwin; Wilbur Penn
- Cinematography: James Rodriguez
- Edited by: Brian O'Neill
- Music by: Federico Chavez-Blanc
- Production company: Bright Shining City Productions
- Release date: April 26, 2008
- Running time: 84 minutes
- Country: United States
- Language: English

Forgiveness, also known as Esther's Diary, is a 2008 American dramatic Holocaust film written and directed by Polish-American director Mariusz Kotowski, with a screenplay by Allan Knee. The film is marked as being the director's first feature-length film.

== Plot ==
A Roman Catholic child Apollonia Kowalski and a Jewish child Esther Blumenfeld, were childhood best friends in 1940's Poland. The two girls were separated when Esther was taken away to a Nazi concentration camp. When the war ended, both girls separately emigrated to the United States with their families. They remained separated thereafter.

Years later, Apollonia's daughter, Maria Patterson (Shelley Calene-Black), and Esther's daughter, Sarah Blumenfeld (Sydney Barrosse), have become successful professional women, but each still deals with the memories of the Holocaust via strained relationships with their respective mothers. Esther dies but has left a memoir of her experiences in the camp with her daughter, Sarah. Apollonia (Juli Erickson) is confined to a nursing home and, though Maria tries her best to care for her, she and her mother are at constant odds. A secret that Apollonia has been hiding comes to light, and the uncovering of this secret causes Apollonia and Maria to resolve their differences and brings Maria and Sarah into each other's lives.

== Partial cast ==
- Shelley Calene-Black as Maria Patterson
- Juli Erickson as Apollonia Kowalski
- Sydney Barrosse as Sarah Blumenfeld
- Jamie Goodwin as Jeff Patterson, Maria's husband
- Wilbur Penn as Clayton, Maria's co-worker
- Dell Aldrich as Esther (voice)
- Christina Childress as Jennifer
- Jon Davis as Roger (voice)
- Greg Dorchak as Pete
- Chris Doubeck as Paul
- Sean Elliot as Matthew
- Krystal Morton as Young Esther
- Kathryn Olsen as Young Apollonia
- Steve Uzzell as Dean Denson
- Cyndi Williams as Lisa (voice)

== Background ==
The film's story is told through a series of narratives from a fictional memoir of the period, illustrated with archival footage provided by the Auschwitz-Birkenau State Museum, Oświęcim, Poland, additional archive material from the Jewish Historical Institute, and photographs of the concentration camp ruins by Michael Kenna. Some of the film's archival footage comes from the same sources used in the French short film Night And Fog.

Forgiveness was shot on location in Austin, Texas in August 2007, with the director having to deal with seasonal rains and the illness of one of the lead actresses.

== Release ==
The film premiered at the Ninth Annual Polish Film Festival of Los Angeles, California on April 26, 2008. After screening at film festivals through 2008 and 2009, including the Los Angeles Film Festival and West Hollywood International Film Festival, Kotowski re-edited the film to feature a more central emphasis on the film's Holocaust story. The film was then re-titled Esther's Diary and re-released, having its premiere at the New Hope Film Festival on June 26, 2010, and screenings at festivals such as River Bend Film Festival in South Bend, Indiana. Director Mariusz Kotowski's production company Bright Shining City Productions released Esther's Diary on DVD in September 2010; the film is currently being sold direct via Bright Shining City Productions' official website.

=== Awards ===
==== As Forgiveness ====
- Third Place Jury Award - Bayou City Inspirational Film Festival (2008)
- Telly Awards - Silver (2008)
- Silver Remi Award - WorldFest (2009)
- EMPixx Awards - Platinum (2009)

==== As Esther's Diary ====
- Best Narrative Feature - Great Lakes International Film Festival (2010)
- Relix Award - Glen Rose Neo-Relix Film Festival (2010)
- EMPixx Award - Platinum (2010)
- The Indie Fest - Award of Merit (2010)
- Telly Awards - Bronze (2010)

== Reception ==
Jerusalem Post wrote "Forgiveness is like a complex jigsaw puzzle or murder mystery in which apparently disconnected pieces fall into place only gradually. For those looking for a movie dominated by strong, independent women, this is the one to see."

Jewish Journal contrasted the film against others at the Polish Film Festival by noting that, even though directed and written by a Polish filmmaker and reflecting the memories of wartime Poland, it was filmed with an American cast and set in a contemporary American city. It was offered that the film had a compelling plot line, but its strength was in how it dealt with the relationships of its female characters. They summarize, "A bond between two adult, self-confident women has rarely been portrayed as effectively."

== See also ==
- List of Holocaust films
