= The Moon-Spinners =

1964 film by James Neilson

- Theatrical release poster
- Directed by: James Neilson
- Screenplay by: Michael Dyne
- Based on: The Moon-Spinners by Mary Stewart
- Produced by: Walt Disney; Bill Anderson
- Starring: Hayley Mills; Eli Wallach; Peter McEnery; Joan Greenwood; Irene Papas; Pola Negri
- Cinematography: Paul Beeson
- Edited by: Gordon Stone
- Music by: Ron Grainer
- Production company: Walt Disney Productions
- Distributed by: Buena Vista Distribution
- Release dates: July 2, 1964 (premiere); July 8, 1964
- Running time: 118 minutes
- Language: English
- Box office: est. $3,500,000 (US/ Canada)

The Moon-Spinners is a 1964 American mystery film starring Hayley Mills, Eli Wallach and Peter McEnery in a story about a jewel thief hiding on the island of Crete. Produced by Walt Disney Productions, the film was loosely based upon a 1962 suspense novel by Mary Stewart and was directed by James Neilson. It featured the silent film actress Pola Negri in her final screen performance.

The Moon-Spinners was Hayley Mills' fifth film in the series of six for Disney. It includes her first "proper" on-screen romance in a Disney film.

== Plot ==
A young English woman named Nikky Ferris and her aunt, Frances, a musicologist, travel to the village of Elounda, on the island of Crete. They rent a room at the Moon-Spinners Inn, though the innkeeper, Sophia, initially refuses them until her teenage son Alexis and Aunt Frances persuade her. Sophia's older brother, Stratos, not wanting any guests at the inn, questions Aunt Frances about why she chose the Moon-Spinners Inn, then reluctantly allows her and Nikky to stay one night.

During a wedding party at the inn later that evening, Nikky meets a young Englishman named Mark Camford, who invites her and Aunt Frances to dinner. He hints that Stratos is more than he appears. Mark then invites Nikky for a morning swim in the Bay of Dolphins. Later that night, Mark follows Stratos when he goes night fishing at the Bay of Dolphins. While watching Stratos, Mark is attacked.

The following morning, Nikky is disappointed to hear that Mark has abruptly checked out. While out walking, Nikky follows a trail of blood to a church basement where she finds a wounded Mark hiding. He asks Nikky to fetch some supplies, refusing to explain how he was shot. Nikky returns with a first aid kit, brandy, and a travel rug. Mark urges Nikky and her aunt to go to the nearby town of Agios Nikolaos for safety.

Returning to the inn, Nikky runs into Stratos, who is looking for her after learning about the missing items from Aunt Frances. Stratos sees through Nikky's cover story and searches the church, which is empty. Stratos ties Nikky up in a windmill while enlisting his crony Lambis to find Mark. Mark and Alexis later rescue Nikky.

Nikky and Mark take refuge in the ruins of an ancient temple. Mark reveals he is a former bank employee. While transporting jewelry from the bank to the Countess of Fleet, he was attacked and robbed, then fired. Mark believes Stratos stole the jewels and hid them somewhere in the Bay of Dolphins.

The duo spend the night hiding in the temple while Stratos hunts for them. The next morning, the British consul at Heraklion, Anthony Gamble, finds the pair and takes them to his summer villa in Agios Nikolaos, where his wife, Cynthia, looks after them. Anthony, who is actually Stratos' partner in crime, assures Stratos that he will deal with the couple.

Nikky learns from the Gambles that a rich woman named Madam Habib is arriving on her yacht. Mark surmises that Stratos intends to sell her the stolen jewels. Cynthia drugs Mark so that the Gambles can send him, along with Nikky, to an Athens hospital. En route to the airport, Mark awakens, tells Nikky he has to stop Stratos, kisses her, and leaves. He fights Stratos but fails to prevent him from absconding with the jewels. Nikky steals a motor launch and heads to Madame Habib's yacht.

Nikky tells Madam Habib that Stratos is a thief and is selling stolen jewels belonging to the Countess of Fleet, who happens to be an old friend of Habib's. Stratos arrives for the transaction. Mark, Frances, and Alexis arrive with the police and a fight ensues. Stratos is arrested and Madam Habib returns the jewels to Mark. Alexis leaves by boat, waving at Mark and Nikky, implying that they will be married by the time they return to Crete.

== Cast ==
- Hayley Mills as Nikky Ferris
- Eli Wallach as Stratos
- Peter McEnery as Mark Camford
- Joan Greenwood as Frances Ferris
- Irene Papas as Sophia
- Pola Negri as Madame Habib
- Michael Davis as Alexis
- John Le Mesurier as Anthony Gamble
- Paul Stassino as Lambis
- Sheila Hancock as Cynthia Gamble
- André Morell as Yacht Captain
- George Pastell as Police Lieutenant
- Tutte Lemkow as Orestes
- Steve Plytas as Hearse Driver
- Harry Tardios as Bus Driver
- Pamela Barrie as Ariadne
- Mel Blanc as Cat Effects (uncredited)

== Differences between the book and the film ==
The plots in the film and the book bear little resemblance. The book is aimed at an adult romantic suspense readership, while the film is aimed at a wider Disney audience, with a plot appropriate for a young adult audience. The lead character in the film, Nikky Ferris, is a teenager out of her depth, where Nicola Ferris is a secretary in the British Embassy in Athens, fluent in Greek. In the book, a mature Nicola travels alone to Crete and deals with life-and-death situations, though her cousin Frances Scourby, a botanist, joins Nicola Ferris late in the action. In the film an adolescent and less resolute Nikky is accompanied by her aunt Frances, a musicologist interested in folk tunes. The film leaves out entirely the main character Colin Langley, Mark's 15-year-old brother, who in the film is a composite with the local Greek boy, Alexis. The film morphs the character Lambis, the captain of the boat rented by the Langley brothers to tour the Greek Isles, from an ally to an adversary. In the film Mark Camford is on the trail of jewel thieves for a theft in which he was custodian of the jewels. The novel leaves out the character of Madam Habib entirely. In the novel Mark and Colin Langley are tourists in Crete who unwittingly witness a local murder, Mark is shot and initially left for dead, Colin is kidnapped by the killers and escapes with the help of Sophia, and Mark Langley is subsequently hunted by the local killers who he must elude while searching for his brother. Initially unwittingly (Lambis involves Nicola against her will), and later as an ally, Nicola becomes increasingly entangled by circumstances. Mark insists that Nicola stay clear of further involvement in his dangerous situation, and Nicola checks into Stratos's hotel in Agios Georgios, unknowingly finding herself among Mark's pursuers. On her way to warn Mark, Nicola encounters the escaped young Colin and protects him until he is reunited with Mark. Nicola Ferris takes a more active part in the more dangerous denouement of the plot in the novel than does Nikki Ferris in the film, who just appeals to Madam Habib to untangle the situation.

== Production ==
The film production is similar to other Disney live-action features made in the 1950s and 1960s for more mainstream audiences, such as Treasure Island (1950) and 20,000 Leagues Under the Sea (1954). It was Walt Disney's penultimate live-action film in which he was credited as producer while alive.

Disney persuaded silent film actress Pola Negri, who had been retired for two decades, to return to the screen for her last film. For the 2006 biographical documentary film Pola Negri: Life Is a Dream in Cinema, both Mills and Wallach were extensively interviewed about their work with Negri in The Moon-Spinners.

== Critical reception ==
The New York Times critic Bosley Crowther offered a mixed review, praising "the ripening attractiveness of the young British actress Hayley Mills and some beautiful scenery in color on the island of Crete", but calling the film "essentially an entertainment for the younger set". With regard to adult viewers, he noted that "it is a picture in which standard melodrama abounds – the kind that the older observer may find just too bubbling with clichés". Rotten Tomatoes, describing the film as a "distilled Hitchcockian suspense yarn, diluted for the consumption of children", gives it an approval rating of 63%.

== See also ==
- List of American films of 1964
