= Chris Kerson =

American actor

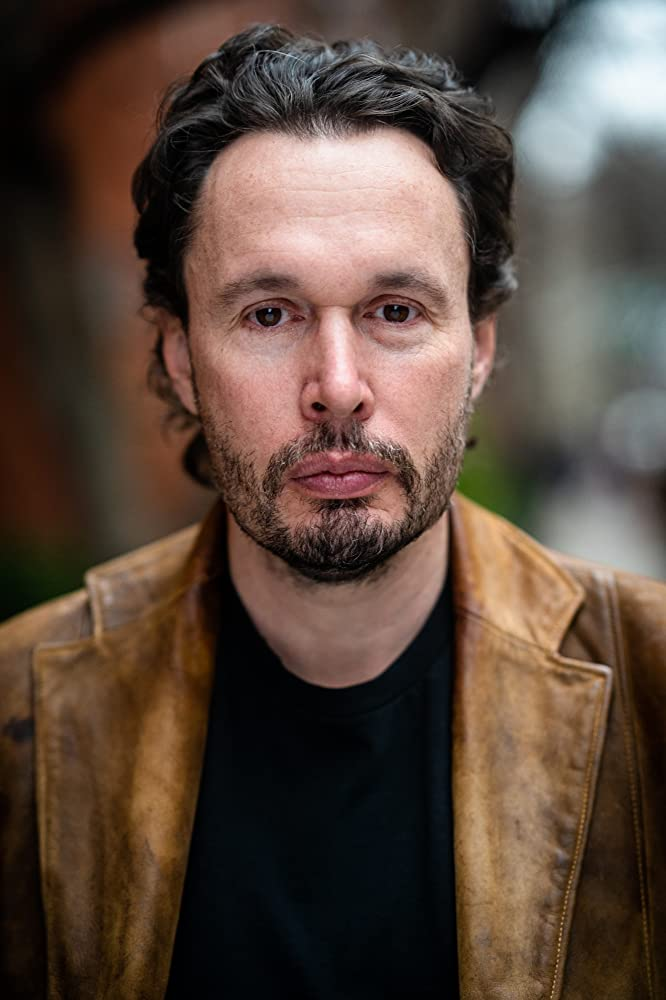
- Born: Christopher Buckley Kerson; New York City, New York, U.S.
- Education: Iona Preparatory School
- Alma mater: College of William and Mary
- Occupations: film, television, and theater actor
- Notable work: True Detective, Gotti
- Website: https://www.chriskerson.com/

Chris Kerson is an American film, television, and theater actor. He is best known for his roles as Nails in True Detective and Wilfred "Willie Boy" Johnson in Gotti.

== Early life ==
Kerson was born in New York City, and spent his childhood in Manhattan and Westchester. He attended the College of William and Mary, where he earned a bachelor's degree in Psychology. During his studies, he happened into an acting class to satisfy an arts elective and discovered a passion that would become his career. Following graduation, he spent time in New York City and Los Angeles for work and continued developing his craft.

== Career ==
=== Film ===
Kerson's filmography begins with a role in Paul Duran's debut feature, Flesh Suitcase, which premiered at WorldFest Houston in 1995. He played the lead in The Ride by NYU filmmaker and Martin Scorsese Scholarship recipient Thomas Kim, which Scorsese named best short film of the year. In 2010, Kerson found critical and audience acclaim as the lead in Sean Kirkpatrick's Big Break Movie Contest feature Cost of a Soul. The gritty drama about a combat soldier who returns to violence on the streets of Philadelphia opened in fifty theaters nationwide and screened at numerous festivals. Kerson played a supporting role in Broadway's Finest, which won the Audience Award for Best Film at the 2012 Long Island International Film Expo. He followed that performance as a co-star in Another Zero in the System before working alongside Lance Henriksen in the cult sci-fi Daylight's End. Kerson won multiple awards for his co-starring role in the 2019 suspense short Rendezvous. He played Paddy (son of Bruce Dern's character) in the 2020 comedy Last Call. Chris played a lead role as Detective Kevin McKenzie in Equal Standard, a 2020 NYPD action and crime-thriller starring and executive-produced by Ice-T.

=== Television ===
Kerson's work in television started with a supporting role as Buck in the "Takedown" episode of Pacific Blue's first season. In 2010, he nabbed an uncredited role as the Cool Camera Guy in the "College" episode (season 5, episode 6) of 30 Rock. Next, Kerson played Gunnar in the Merchants of Menace episode in the 15th season of the hit show CSI: Crime Scene Investigation. In 2015, Kerson landed his breakout role as the recurring character Nails in the HBO hit True Detective. Nails is named for the scars he bears as the result of a nail gun attack.

=== Theater ===
Kerson has worked Off-Broadway in a variety of theater roles. Early billings include Franz Xaver Kroetz's play The Nest and Stephan Morrow's Hurry, a sold-out show at the Blue Heron Art Center. He played Carl the Usher in the New York premiere of Tennessee Williams's rediscovered play These Are the Stairs You Got to Watch. Kerson also starred in Mario Fratti's Missionaries opposite theater icon Rose Gregorio.

== Awards and nominations ==
Year	Award	Category	Event	Film	Result
2020	Platinum Award	Best Supporting Actor	Royal Wolf Film Awards	Rendezvous	Won
2020	Jury Prize	Best Team Performance in a Short Film; Shared with Katarina Morhacova, David Lago, Mike sutton Francis Jue, Casey McDougal, Lisa Boucher Hartman	South Film & Arts Academy Festival	Rendezvous	Won
2020	Grand Jury Award	Best Ensemble Cast; Shared with Katarina Morhacova, David Lago, Mike sutton Francis Jue, Casey McDougal, Lisa Boucher Hartman	Oniros Film Awards	Rendezvous	Won
2020	Jury Award	Best Ensemble Cast; Shared with Katarina Morhacova, David Lago, Mike sutton Francis Jue, Casey McDougal, Lisa Boucher Hartman	Oniros Film Awards	Rendezvous	Nominated
2020	Diamond Award	Best Supporting Actor	Mindfield Film Festival	Rendezvous	Won
2020	Gold Award	Best Ensemble Cast; Shared with Katarina Morhacova, David Lago, Mike sutton Francis Jue, Casey McDougal, Lisa Boucher Hartman	Best Actor Award - New York	Rendezvous	Won
2020	Jury Prize	Best Supporting Actor	Dreamachine International Film Festival	Rendezvous	Won
2020	Gold Award	Best Actor in a Supporting Role	International Independent Film Awards	Rendezvous	Won
2015	Audience Award	Best Short Film	Long Island International Film Expo	Grace	Won
