= Cyndi Williams =

American voice actress and script writer

Cyndi Lou Williams is an American voice actress and script writer. She has mainly appeared in anime series by ADV Films. She was nominated for an Independent Spirit Award for Best Lead Actress for her performance in Kyle Henry's film, Room (2005), which was nominated for the Cassavetes Award.

== Filmography ==
=== Anime roles ===
- Birth - Mu-nyo, Nam’s Ostrich
- Magical Play - Sister Rose
- Petite Princess Yucie - Ercell
- Rurouni Kenshin: Reminiscence - Women
- Sakura Diaries - Alica, Touma's Mother
- Variable Geo - Miranda Johana
- Wedding Peach - Cloud, Nocturne, Butterfly

=== Video games ===
- DC Universe Online - Poison Ivy, Queen Bee, Additional Voices

== Script writer ==
- Maburaho
- Happy Lesson
- Science Ninja Team Gatchaman (2005 ADV dub)
