= Buy–sell agreement =

Legal agreement in a trade

A buy–sell agreement, also known as a buyout agreement, is a legally binding agreement between co-owners of a business that governs the situation if a co-owner dies or is otherwise forced to leave the business, or chooses to leave the business.

It may be thought of as a sort of premarital agreement between business partners/shareholders or is sometimes called a "business will". An insured buy–sell agreement (triggered buyout is funded with life insurance on the participating owners' lives) is often recommended by business-succession specialists and financial planners to ensure that the buy–sell arrangement is well-funded and to guarantee that there will be money when the buy–sell event is triggered.

== Clauses ==
A buy–sell agreement consists of several legally binding clauses in a business partnership or operating agreement or a separate, freestanding agreement, and controls the following business decisions:

- Who can buy a departing partner's or shareholder's share of the business (this may include outsiders or be limited to other partners/shareholders);
- What events will trigger a buyout, (the most common events that trigger a buyout are: death, disability, retirement, or an owner leaving the company) and;
- What price will be paid for a partner's or shareholder's interest in the partnership and so on.

Buy–sell agreement can be in the form of a cross-purchase plan or a repurchase (entity or stock-redemption) plan. For greater neutrality and effectiveness of the buy–sell arrangement, the service of a corporate trustee is recommended.

Profit or loss from a buy-sell agreement may trigger tax consequences and taxable income.
