= David Lago =

Cuban-American actor

- Born: David Scott Lago; January 18, 1979 (age 46); Downey, California, U.S.

David Scott Lago (/ˈlɑːɡoʊ/; born January 18, 1979, in Downey, California) is a Cuban-American actor. He is best known for playing Raul Guittierez on The Young and the Restless from 1999 to 2004. He has also had a recurring role as Jeremy on 7th Heaven.

== Career ==
=== Film and television ===
He was nominated for a Daytime Emmy Award in 2000, 2001, 2003, and 2004, before finally winning in 2005, his last year on the soap. He had not prepared a speech, so he left the audience stunned by simply repeating a line from the film Catch Me If You Can about two mice falling into a bucket of cream.

He also won a Young Artist Award in 2000 for his portrayal of Raul, having previously been nominated in 1999 for his role in the short-lived television series, Hollywood Safari. He has since been in a number of independent films and has also been executive producer too.

In May 2009, Lago briefly returned to The Young and the Restless in the role of Raul.

On February 3, 2010, David began starring as his idol Elvis Presley in the Broadway Production of Million Dollar Quartet in Chicago's Apollo Theater. He also starred in the erotic psychological thriller Deeper and Deeper (2010), playing the role of Ryan, a bank teller who rents a room in a high rise building to spy on an attractive business woman who lives in an adjacent building.

Lago played the police officer in the 2019 suspense-thriller Rendezvous. In 2019, he was also cast in the guest-starring role of Justin Ramos in The Bay.

=== Theater ===
David played Elvis Presley from 2010 to 2011 in Million Dollar Quartet at the Apollo Theater in Chicago. The 90-minute rock 'n' roll musical was performed 8 times a week to sold-out crowds. He played the lead in Superman in 2016 at the Grove Theater in Upland, California.
