= After You've Gone (True Detective) =

- True Detective episode
- Episode no.: Season 1 Episode 7
- Directed by: Cary Joji Fukunaga
- Written by: Nic Pizzolatto
- Cinematography by: Adam Arkapaw
- Editing by: Meg Reticker; Alex Hall
- Original air date: March 2, 2014
- Running time: 53 minutes

Guest appearances
- Tim Bell as CID Clerk; Dave Davis as Toby; JD Evermore as Detective Lutz; Glenn Fleshler as Lawnmower Man; Michael Harney as Sheriff Steve Geraci; Jay Huguley as Jimmy Ledoux; Johnny McPhail as Robert Doumain; Kelsey Scott as Fiona Jackson; Carol Sutton as Delores; Madison Wolfe as Audrey Hart

Episode chronology
← Previous "Haunted Houses"	Next → "Form and Void"
- True Detective season 1

"After You've Gone" is the seventh episode of the first season of the American anthology crime drama television series True Detective. The episode was written by series creator Nic Pizzolatto, and directed by executive producer Cary Joji Fukunaga. It was first broadcast on HBO in the United States on March 2, 2014.

The season focuses on Louisiana State Police homicide detectives Rustin "Rust" Cohle (Matthew McConaughey) and Martin "Marty" Hart (Woody Harrelson), who investigate the murder of prostitute Dora Lange in 1995. Seventeen years later, they must revisit the investigation, along with several other unsolved crimes. In the episode, Cohle and Hart reunite after ten years to investigate more events related to their previous cases.

According to Nielsen Media Research, the episode was seen by an estimated 2.34 million household viewers and gained a 1.0 ratings share among adults aged 18–49. The episode received critical acclaim, with critics praising the performances, writing, directing, score and ending.

== Plot ==
=== 2012 ===
At a bar, Rust (Matthew McConaughey) tells Marty (Woody Harrelson) that he found evidence that links the murders at Lake Charles to Dora Lange's murder through a cult. He also discovered that it could link to further disappearances of dozens of women and children in the coast of Louisiana. Marty refuses to participate, until Rust pressures him, stating that he is in "debt" with him for killing Ledoux in 1995 before he could confess anything. (Note: As depicted in "The Secret Fate of All Life".)

Rust takes the still-distrustful Marty to his storage unit, which is filled with evidence he has kept for years. Rust found out an immense amount of disappearances related to Tuttle's schools, one of which was the one that Marie Fontenot attended before closing after accusations of child molestation. The school re-opened a few years later, now called Light of the Way Academy, which was attended by Rianne Olivier. In 2010, he contacted an alumnus, Toby Boelert, who is now a prostitute. Toby explained that people in animal masks often took pictures of them and abused some of the children, and Marie was the only one to actually speak about it before her disappearance. He further identifies one of the people as the man with scars on his face.

Rust asks Marty to help him, explaining that many disappearances were related to obscure ritual offshoots of well-known New Orleans folklore involving animal mask and deer antlers, spread along the same area where the Tuttles originate from. He also speculates that one of the reasons why so many disappearances were unreported was their concomitance to these Mardi Gras traditions as well as Hurricane Katrina. He further reveals that he broke into Tuttle's houses in Baton Rouge and Shreveport. He speculates only the latter was reported because of what he retrieved in Baton Rouge: disturbing photos, including some that depict children in the forest wearing antlers, and a videotape where people in costumes and masks ritualistically rape and murder Marie Fontenot. Marty is horrified by its content and agrees to help him, without telling authorities as Rust fears they may be involved with Tuttle. He just asks if he was involved in Tuttle's death, which Rust denies, deducing that a member of the cult may have killed him after the videotape went missing.

Marty visits his now ex-wife Maggie. The conversation, including updates about their two daughters, seems to indicate they have been divorced for a long time and estranged for at least two years, and she is happily remarried and goes by the surname Sawyer. Marty explains to her that he has the duty to help Rust. His secrecy about what this entails, and the air of farewell he displays when he thanks her for their time together, worries Maggie. She visits Rust, who has still not forgiven her for using him years earlier, (Note: As depicted in "Haunted Houses".) and he angrily dismisses her concerns by refusing to be specific on how dangerous their joint investigation will be.

They move the evidence to Marty's investigator office. Using his connections, Marty retrieves old cases from the police department. They then question Jimmy Ledoux, a distant relative of Reggie Ledoux, who does not appear to be involved in Reggie's activities, but recognizes that he once met the man with scars. They also question Delores Jackson, who worked for Billy Lee Tuttle's father. Delores says that Tuttle's father had a grandson through another family, the Childress family, and that the boy had a scarred face. She then has a nervous breakdown where she mentions Carcosa, and both Rust and Marty are asked to leave.

Marty reveals to Rust that the files placed then deputy Steve Geraci (Michael Harney) as the person who originally investigated Marie Fontenot's case. Marty talks with Geraci, now the Iberia sheriff, who claims that his boss Ted Childress ordered him to drop the investigation. Marty suspects that he is not being honest about the case. He invites Geraci to go fishing in his boat, where Rust holds Geraci at gunpoint.

Gilbough (Michael Potts) and Papania (Tory Kittles) are in the bayou trying to find the burned-out church that Rust mentioned. Unable to find the address, they stop by a cemetery to ask the caretaker (Glenn Fleshler) for the location. (Note: The same groundskeeper who talked to Rust in "The Locked Room".) After the caretaker points them in the right direction, they drive off, failing to notice that the lower part of his face is heavily scarred. He says to himself, "my family's been here a long, long time," implying a Tuttle connection. The pattern he is cutting into the grass also resembles the familiar spiral triangle motif.

== Production ==
=== Development ===
In January 2014, the episode's title was revealed as "After You've Gone" and it was announced that series creator Nic Pizzolatto had written the episode while executive producer Cary Joji Fukunaga had directed it. This was Pizzolatto's seventh writing credit, and Fukunaga's seventh directing credit.

=== Writing ===
According to creator Nic Pizzolatto, the episode was meant to stop any indication that either Cohle or Hart would be the killer, explaining "There's enough fragmentary history in Episode 7 that, like Hemingway's iceberg, what is obscured can be discerned by what is visible. We have further context and dimension to explore with the killer, but the true questions now are whether Cohle and Hart succeed, what they will find, and whether they'll make it out alive."

== Reception ==
=== Viewers ===
The episode was watched by 2.34 million viewers, earning a 1.0 in the 18-49 rating demographics on the Nielson ratings scale. This means that 1 percent of all households with televisions watched the episode. This was a 12% decrease from the previous episode, which was watched by 2.64 million viewers with a 1.1 in the 18-49 demographics.

=== Critical reviews ===
"After You've Gone" received critical acclaim. Jim Vejvoda of IGN gave the episode an "amazing" 9 out of 10 and wrote in his verdict, "True Detective has become more familiar and straightforward over the last two episodes as it resolves its central mystery, but the performances and overall execution of the show remain stellar."

Erik Adams of The A.V. Club was more critical, giving the episode a "C" grade and writing, "I get worried that, after seven episodes of difficult answers and muddled morality, True Detective is headed toward a tidy conclusion in which Marty and Rust get the heroic moment they invented after killing Ledoux. Meanwhile, the falls he and his once-and-current partner have taken keep me anticipating that finale, and they make tonight's talky, exposition-heavy speed bumps easier to ride out. ... They've been narrowed down to a two-man crew, just trying to make one last wrong right. In order for that to happen, they had to become schnooks. It's just a bummer that the episode in which that happens is a bit of a schnook as well."

Britt Hayes of Screen Crush wrote, "'After You've Gone' plunges full speed ahead to give us one hell of a gripping episode that inspired more than a few fist pumps from yours truly—and while Nic Pizzolatto presents more of that particular deep fried, unnerving procedural approach in an effort to propel things forward in an unrelenting fashion, that's not to say he's ditched the philosophy altogether."

Alan Sepinwall of HitFix wrote, "And the structure of the series means that anything could happen in next week's finale: the death of one or both of our heroes, the success or failure of their investigation, a perfectly mundane explanation for the activities of this family of killers, or a more supernatural one befitting the many theories about the Yellow King, Carcosa, et al. This story's over after one more hour, come what may, and then the slate gets wiped clean. Rust Cohle no longer cares about anything but tying off this circle, which makes him incredibly dangerous. And because Pizzolatto doesn't have to worry about bringing any of these characters with him to True Detective season 2, he's just as dangerous." Gwilym Mumford of The Guardian wrote, "Even if Hart and Cohle do manage to close the case, there's very little awaiting them on the other side. Their lives, as depicted in a crushing montage, are pitiably lonely: Rust drinks himself into a stupor and Marty has no relationship with his kids, and sits at home browsing Match.com. You wonder whether going out in some triumphant blaze of glory (maybe something like the shootout in "The Secret Fate of All Life" but, you know, real) might be the best solution for both of them." Kevin Jagernauth of IndieWire gave the episode a "B" grade and wrote, "With Pizzolatto describing the last two episodes of True Detective as the third act of his saga, much of 'After You've Gone' plays like a table setting for the finale, but still, an undeniably riveting one."

James Poniewozik of Time wrote, "'After You've Gone', the next-to-last episode of True Detective season one, largely leaves the past behind, in the structural sense. As it drives toward its endgame, it mostly takes place in 2012, leaving behind the series' complex, time-skipping, flashback-and-interrogation structure. And yet, as it reunites a worse-for-wear Marty and Rust, 'After You’ve Gone' is also loaded down with the past." Kenny Herzog of Vulture gave the episode a 4 star rating out of 5 and wrote, "True Detective has taken us on an arc that lesser shows might resolve in a single episode, or, as we've witnessed more commonly, forcibly protract to the point of viewer disconsolation. It has instead used a finite narrative to introduce an incredible interconnected population of characters, none of whom are mere red herrings, while allowing us to stumble toward convictions alongside the show's leads. Not to mention all that philosophy for thought, whether inconsequential or essential. The one sure thing is that, as Rust and Marty come up upon the Tuttles' patch of land outside Erath, shit's about to get real." Tony Sokol of Den of Geek gave the episode a perfect 5 star rating out of 5 and wrote, "I have mentioned Angel Heart in reference to True Detective and written on the satanic detective genre as a whole. This series is so fulfilling. It's like watching Angel Heart, if that's your cup of darjeeling tea – it's one of my all-time favorites, in slow motion. Reverb first. Every nasty detail splayed out in front of you to enjoy. I mean, yeah, it's broken up into hour long portions, but think how it'll be when you binge watch this motherfucker."

Chris O'Hara of TV Fanatic gave the episode a perfect 5 star rating out of 5 and wrote, "Rust and Marty had spun out of control and out of each other's lives, but now seemed to be spiraling toward some final resolution with just one episode to go." Shane Ryan of Paste gave the episode a 9.6 out of 10 and wrote, "We have one hour left with these remarkable characters, and if I have my guess, the circles of their fate will all be closed when the final credits roll."
