= Form and Void (True Detective) =

- True Detective episode
- Episode no.: Season 1 Episode 8
- Directed by: Cary Joji Fukunaga
- Written by: Nic Pizzolatto
- Cinematography by: Adam Arkapaw
- Editing by: Affonso Gonçalves; Alex Hall; Meg Reticker
- Original air date: March 9, 2014
- Running time: 54 minutes

Guest appearances
- Ann Dowd as Betty; Glenn Fleshler as Errol Childress; Michael Harney as Sheriff Steve Geraci; Veronica Hunsinger-Loe as Teacher; Kurt Krause as Chad; Johnny McPhail as Robert Doumain; Terry Moore as Lilly Hill; Erin Moriarty as Teenage Audrey Hart; David Stifel as Billy Lee Childress; Madison Wolfe as Young Audrey Hart; Rachel Wulff as News Reporter

Episode chronology
← Previous "After You've Gone"	Next → "The Western Book of the Dead"
- True Detective season 1

"Form and Void" is the eighth episode and season finale of the first season of the American anthology crime drama television series True Detective. The episode was written by series creator Nic Pizzolatto, and directed by executive producer Cary Joji Fukunaga. It was first broadcast on HBO in the United States on March 9, 2014.

The season focuses on Louisiana State Police homicide detectives Rustin "Rust" Cohle (Matthew McConaughey) and Martin "Marty" Hart (Woody Harrelson), who investigate the murder of prostitute Dora Lange in 1995. Seventeen years later, they must revisit the investigation, along with several other unsolved crimes. In the episode, Cohle and Hart use all their resources to finally apprehend the killer, having finally located his whereabouts.

According to Nielsen Media Research, the episode was seen by an estimated 3.52 million household viewers and gained a 1.6 ratings share among adults aged 18–49, making it the most watched episode of the series. The episode received universal acclaim from critics and audiences, who praised the performances, writing, directing, cinematography, atmosphere, music, tension, pace and closure. For his performance in the episode, Matthew McConaughey received an Outstanding Lead Actor in a Drama Series nomination at the 66th Primetime Emmy Awards.

== Plot ==
=== 2012 ===
The caretaker with facial scarring featured at the end of the previous episode (Glenn Fleshler) watches over a man bound to a bed, whom he calls "daddy". After watching Cary Grant and James Mason in North by Northwest on TV, he begins to use a British accent, and has a sexual encounter with Betty (Ann Dowd), his developmentally disabled lover. He is later seen painting a building at a school playground and staring at the children.

Marty (Woody Harrelson) lures Geraci (Michael Harney) onto a boat, where Rust (Matthew McConaughey) forces him to watch the videotape depicting Marie Fontenot's rape and murder. Geraci confesses that Sheriff Ted Childress was in charge of the investigation and interfered with files before dropping the case. They then have a hidden gunman shoot Geraci’s car in intimidation, pressuring him to assist their investigation and threatening him with exposure of the coverup if he refuses or they are harmed.

While going through old files, Marty notices that a house in Dora Lange's neighborhood was repainted in 1990, connecting it to a child’s report of a ‘green-eared spaghetti monster’ chasing them through the woods. They speak to the home’s owner and track old tax records and find that a company owned by Bill Childress did contract work in the area, and find a home address. Before heading to the house, Rust gives instructions to deliver evidence to the authorities in case he doesn't return, while Marty meets with Papania (Tory Kittles) to ask for him to send backup if he calls.

At the house, Marty finds Betty and the corpse of Bill Childress, and attempts to find a phone as there is no cell service. Rust pursues the caretaker man, Bill’s son Errol Childress, into a labyrinth of tunnels and is taunted by Errol to enter. Rust ventures through the labyrinth alone, while Marty separately enters but is unable to find them. The labyrinth mostly consists of children's clothing, latticework, and skeletons, a place Errol calls Carcosa. Rust eventually reaches a room with an adorned skeleton wearing antlers and a yellow robe and is distracted as he sees a swirling vortex (possibly hallucinated). As Rust is distracted, Errol appears and stabs him in the stomach. Rust headbutts Errol, who is then shot multiple times by an arriving Marty. Despite the shots, Errol throws a roofing hammer at Marty, hitting him in the chest. As he prepares to kill him, Errol is killed with a shot to the head by Rust. Both heavily bleeding, Marty tends to Rust's wound. Meanwhile, Papania and Gilbough (Michael Potts) arrive with back-up at the house, find Betty handcuffed to the stairs, and start searching the area.

A few days later, Gilbough and Papania visit Marty at the hospital. They inform him that Errol and Betty were Billy Childress' children and the tools at his shed match the weapons in Lake Charles and Dora Lange's murder, effectively closing the case. He is also informed that Rust survived but remains in a coma after surgery. Marty cries as he is visited by his family. Meanwhile, the media reports the discovery at Errol's house and dozens of bodies recovered at the scene; the Tuttles avoid charges, but their reputation collapses.

Marty is present at his bedside when Rust wakes up. Rust is disappointed that he couldn't recognize Errol's facial scars when he first saw him mowing the derelict school lawn in 1995 (Note: As depicted in "The Locked Room".) and is also frustrated that they couldn't get everyone responsible held accountable for their actions, although Marty states that their target was just Errol. Some time later, a recovered Marty wheels Rust out of the hospital and they both talk in the parking lot. He expresses that during his coma, he felt happiness knowing he would soon see his deceased daughter and father, lamenting that he survived. Marty gives him a pack of cigarettes as he wheels Rust away from the hospital. They both remark on the concept of "good and evil" and "light and darkness", with Rust saying that while there was at one time only darkness, to him, the light appears to be winning.

== Production ==
=== Development ===
In January 2014, the episode's title was revealed as "Form and Void" and it was announced that series creator Nic Pizzolatto had written the episode while executive producer Cary Joji Fukunaga had directed it. This was Pizzolatto's eighth writing credit, and Fukunaga's eighth directing credit.

=== Writing ===
Before the episode aired, creator Nic Pizzolatto was questioned "what should viewers be thinking about" the episode, to which he responded, "Anything they want. Binary systems, maybe."

Pizzolatto had the ending in mind when he started writing the season, indicating that Rust would be "articulating, without sentimentality or illusion, an actual kind of optimism". He explained, "I want to follow the characters and the story through what they organically demand. And it would have been the easiest thing in the world to kill one or both of these guys." He also wanted the characters to feel a sense of redemption or deliverance, stating "They are not healed, but now, for the first time, you can imagine a future where they are healed. And before that was never a possibility for Cohle and hardly a possibility for Hart. But now it's a real earned possibility."

For the opening scene that depicts Errol Childress' house, Pizzolatto explained, "For the finale, I thought the audience deserved to get a close point of view on the monster, and to recognize him the way you recognize the heroes of True Detective. There are no monsters other than humans, no heroes other than humans. The challenge with Errol was to imply an entire history and personal mythology and methodology within the limited amount of time we had with him. Since this was the finale, I thought we could make room for one more point of view, the dark mirror to our characters, the shadow they've been chasing for so 17 years without knowing it, the historical victim of bad men who murders women and children."

Commenting on Marty's words about not arresting everyone responsible in the conspiracy, Pizzolatto said, "It’s important to me, I think, that Cohle says, “We didn’t get em all, Marty,” and Marty says, “We ain’t going to. This isn’t that kind of world.” This isn’t the kind of world where you mop up everything. We discharged our duty, but of course there are levels and wheels and historical contexts to what happened that we’ll never be able to touch."

There was commentary about whether the skeleton in the labyrinth was truly The Yellow King. According to director Cary Joji Fukunaga, answering the question wasn't the idea behind the episode, saying "It was more of an added layer to the reasons behind the killings. Rather than the Yellow King and the books about Carcosa and the mythology around that being the centerpiece for the finale, it was just another layer."

Some alternate endings were considered for the finale. One involved a mysterious event vanishing Rust and Marty, leaving Gilbough and Papania to clean the scene; the other concept would involve supernatural themes. Pizzolatto discarded the ideas, as it would feel "easy" and would deny "the sort of realist questions the show had been asking all along." He further added, "To retreat to the supernatural, or to take the easy dramatic route of killing a character in order to achieve an emotional response from the audience, I thought would have been a disservice to the story."

=== Filming ===
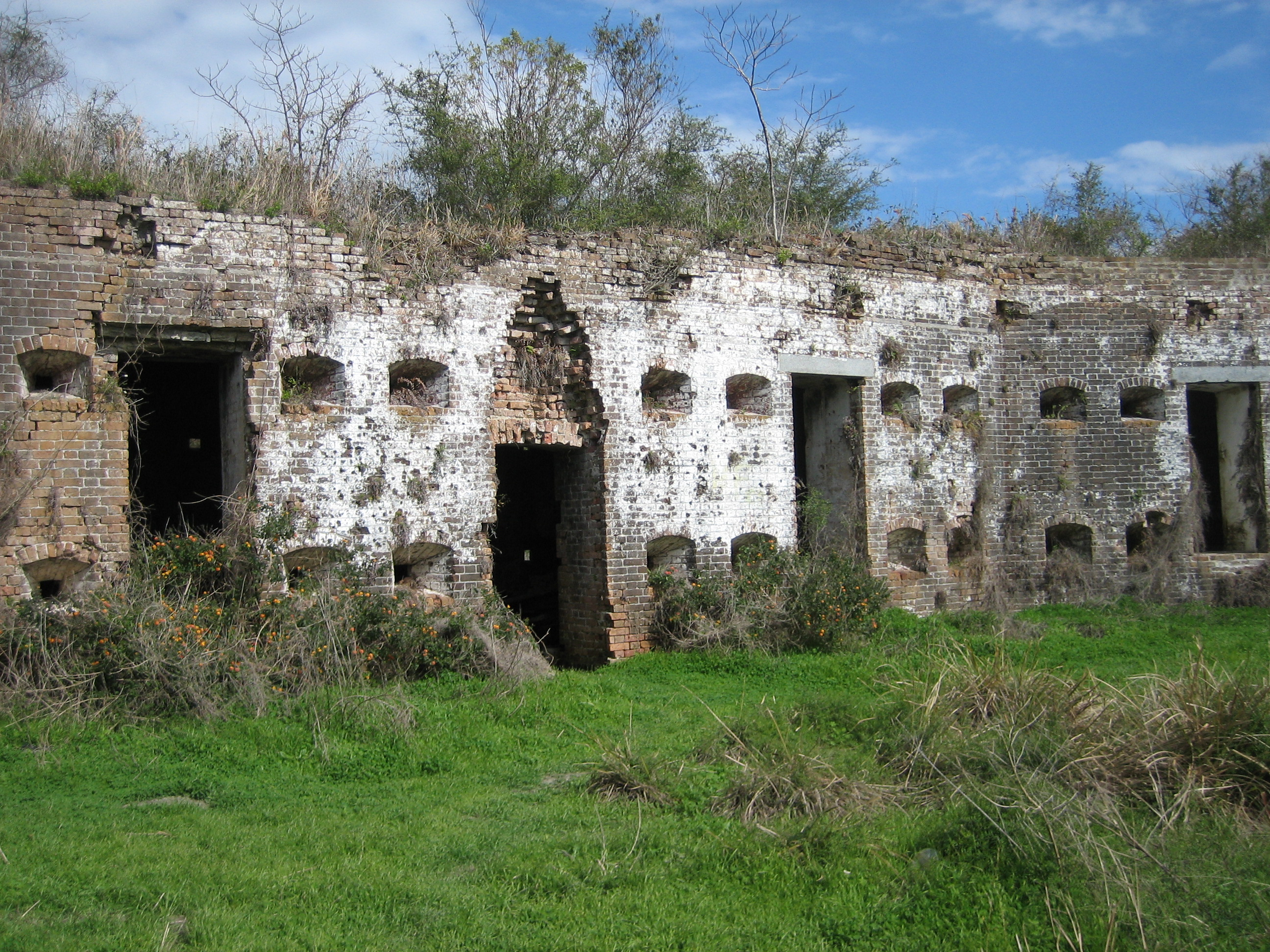
The scenes at the labyrinth were filmed at Fort Macomb, a 19th-century brick fort in Louisiana.

The labyrinth was shot in Fort Macomb, a 19th-century brick fort in Louisiana, on the western shore of Chef Menteur Pass. The scene was originally written to be set in a cypress forest, but complications on filming forced the crew to relocate the location. Production designer Alex DiGerlando commented, "So we were starting to prepare ourselves for a compromise to shoot it in a brushy woodland location where the only really attractive quality was that it allowed for easy access. None of us were really excited about that, though." Fukunaga eventually decided on the fort, saying, "It was all chained and locked up and I like old things like that, especially Civil War things. When we got in, there were snakes everywhere and it was covered with weeds and grass. When we got to the inner chambers it was pretty awesome and really spooky and definitely had some weird energy around it."

== Reception ==
=== Viewers ===
The episode was watched by 3.52 million viewers, earning a 1.6 in the 18-49 rating demographics on the Nielson ratings scale. This means that 1.6 percent of all households with televisions watched the episode. This was a 50% increase from the previous episode, which was watched by 2.34 million viewers with a 1.0 in the 18-49 demographics.

On the night of the airing, HBO Go crashed due to "overwhelmingly popular demand" of the episode.

=== Critical reviews ===
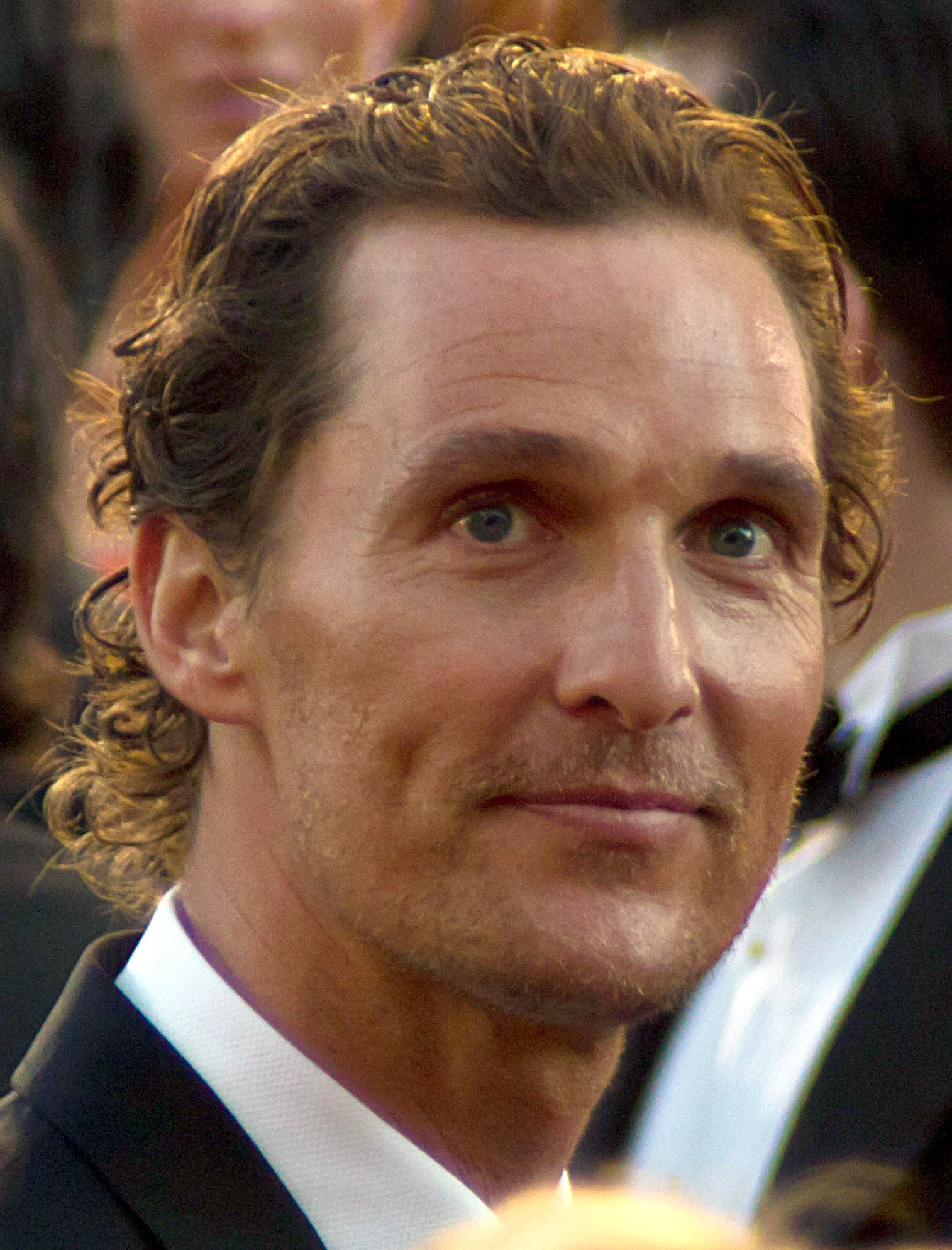
For his performance in the episode, Matthew McConaughey was nominated for Outstanding Lead Actor in a Drama Series at the 66th Primetime Emmy Awards.

"Form and Void" received universal acclaim. Jim Vejvoda of IGN gave the episode a perfect "masterpiece" 10 out of 10 and wrote in his verdict, "The first season finale for HBO's True Detective was a truly creepy, gripping and emotional close to one of the best crime dramas ever produced for television."

Erik Adams of The A.V. Club gave the episode an "A−" grade and wrote, "On some level, everything in True Detective forms a circle; everything in True Detective is connected. You can take that as a death sentence, or you can interpret it as a brotherhood of man type of thing. For the time being, the story Rust and Marty are making up while looking at the stars is more of the latter. The light claims one more victory, all the while acknowledging that it can't hold off defeat forever." Britt Hayes of Screen Crush wrote, "For those seeking a rewarding conclusion to the first season, 'Form and Void' definitely delivers, from full-out creepiness to good ol' Rust Cohle-isms, and yes, even some deep fried detective bromance."

Alan Sepinwall of HitFix wrote, "I'll think of all the times that I was watching it, even as it was presenting variations on things I'd seen a million times before, and thinking about all the ways that the presentation and execution felt so brand-new, so haunting, so moving, and so memorable." Alan Yuhas of The Guardian wrote, "In the end, True Detective finally flipped, and Marty and Rust discovered the good life again. They became the awkward buddy comedy we'd always wanted. I just wish the evidence were a little more convincing." Ben Travers of IndieWire gave the episode an "A" grade and wrote, "'Form and Void' impossibly flipped the perspective in less than an hour. The two detectives chose to see the light instead of the dark, the truth ahead of the lies. It's not the job that defines them, though it does play an integral part. Rust and Marty learned how to define themselves, and, in the end, how to embrace life over death."

James Poniewozik of Time wrote, "Like Marty and Rust solving part, but only part, of the mystery, True Detective did what it did and didn't what it didn't, but as a whole? The light outshone the dark." Brian Lowry of Variety wrote, "Whatever comes next, there's no way to view True Detective as anything but a rousing success, with a glitch pertaining to HBO Go merely demonstrating the rabid appetite for it. Because if cop shows have become TV's answer to McDonald's, this was the equivalent of LudoBites – springing up to deliver unexpected treats for a refined, upscale palate, and poof, just as quickly moving on."

Kenny Herzog of Vulture gave the episode a 5 star rating out of 5 and wrote, "There was, as has been the case throughout, more than a little humor and cliché in 'Form and Void', from Rust and Marty's dueling middle fingers to Errol and Mrs. Errol's overall bayou-bogey-folk eccentricity. Odds are those playful details will pop on second viewings, despite the show's prevailing seriousness. Even Rust looks skyward and reminds himself and Marty that, 'Once there was always dark. If you ask me, the light's winning.' And True Detective, in turn, illuminated a black-and-white crime-and-coppers story with winning oddness to its end." Tony Sokol of Den of Geek gave the episode a perfect 5 star rating out of 5 and wrote, "True Detective's final episode, 'Form and Void', breaks the cardinal rule of show business. Leave 'em wanting more. Oh sure, I'd love to watch this every week for the rest of my life, but this was satisfying. True Detective satisfied me as a supernatural suspense thriller, as a monster movie and as a worthy entry into the Satanic Detective genre. And it was a good cop show, with grit and humor, that could sit atop any list with Joseph Wambaugh in it."

Chris O'Hara of TV Fanatic gave the episode a 5 star rating out of 5 and wrote, "What we got in 'Form and Void' was a fitting conclusion to one of the best seasons of television I have seen in years. It was a finale packed with all the elements of the show which have made it so compelling to watch." Shane Ryan of Paste gave the episode a perfect 10 out of 10 and wrote, "When we refer to True Detective from this moment on, it will be in the past tense, and that realization comes with a weight of sadness. But the phenomenon of its existence can't be restricted to two months of Sundays. There's a permanence in the connection it fostered, and the questions, so remarkably asked, will resonate hereafter."

=== Accolades ===
Matthew McConaughey submitted the episode to support his nomination for Outstanding Lead Actor in a Drama Series at the 66th Primetime Emmy Awards.
