= Who Goes There (True Detective) =

- True Detective episode
- Episode no.: Season 1 Episode 4
- Directed by: Cary Joji Fukunaga
- Written by: Nic Pizzolatto
- Cinematography by: Adam Arkapaw
- Editing by: Affonso Gonçalves
- Original air date: February 9, 2014
- Running time: 57 minutes

Guest appearances
- Alexandra Daddario as Lisa Tragnetti; Kevin Dunn as Major Ken Quesada; Jackson Beals as Detective Mark Daughtry; Aurielle Brimmer as Bungalow Woman #2; Amber Carollo as Kelsey Burgess; Brad Carter as Charlie Lange; Laura Cayouette as Theresa Weems; Joe Chrest as Detective Demma; Silas Cooper as Police Officer; JD Evermore as Detective Lutz; Jon Eyez as "Tiger" Thomas; Todd Giebenhain as Tyrone Weems; Dana Gourrier as Cathleen; Owen Harn as Hunter; Ike Jackson as Tiger's Gang; Shane Jacobsen as Doctor; Lucky Johnson as "Rock"; David Kency as Black; Jim Klock as Detective Ted Bertrand; Garrett Kruithof as Detective Jimmy Dufrene; Joshua Leonard as Mitch; Frank Lynch as Biker #2; Sam Malone as Lamar; Jaren Mitchell as Tiger's Gang; Nic Pizzolatto as The Bartender; Tom Proctor as Biker #1; Dane Rhodes as Detective Favre; Joseph Sikora as "Ginger"; Lloyd Watts as "L"

Episode chronology
← Previous "The Locked Room"	Next → "The Secret Fate of All Life"
- True Detective season 1

"Who Goes There" is the fourth episode of the first season of the American anthology crime drama television series True Detective. The episode was written by series creator Nic Pizzolatto, and directed by executive producer Cary Joji Fukunaga. It was first broadcast on HBO in the United States on February 9, 2014.

The season focuses on Louisiana State Police homicide detectives Rustin "Rust" Cohle (Matthew McConaughey) and Martin "Marty" Hart (Woody Harrelson), who investigate the murder of sex worker Dora Lange in 1995. Seventeen years later, they must revisit the investigation, along with several other unsolved crimes. In the episode, Cohle and Hart identify a connection to Reggie Ledoux and seek to infiltrate a biker gang to get his location.

According to Nielsen Media Research, the episode was seen by an estimated 1.99 million household viewers and gained a 0.8 ratings share among adults aged 18–49. The episode received critical acclaim, with critics praising character development, writing, directing, performances and tension. The six-minute sequence where Rust Cohle takes part in a raid received universal acclaim. For the episode, Cary Joji Fukunaga won Outstanding Directing for a Drama Series at the 66th Primetime Emmy Awards.

== Plot ==
=== 2012 ===
Rust (Matthew McConaughey) is questioned by Gilbough (Michael Potts) and Papania (Tory Kittles) for taking a sick leave, where he claims that he visited his dying father in Alaska. They also separately question Marty (Woody Harrelson) on the claim, as medical records show no evidence of Rust's father even being in the state for 30 years.

=== 1995 ===
Rust and Marty confront Charlie Lange (Brad Carter). Charlie recounts Reggie Ledoux's descriptions of a place where rich men go to worship the devil and sacrifice women and children, mentioning Carcosa and "The Yellow King." He says Reggie has a brand of a spiral on his back. He tells them Ledoux's associate Tyrone Weems (Todd Giebenhain) might know of Reggie's whereabouts.

Lisa (Alexandra Daddario) confronts Marty over his behavior but he insults and dismisses her. In retaliation, Lisa tells Maggie (Michelle Monaghan) about their affair. Marty comes home to find Maggie and their daughters gone, and his own clothes packed in a suitcase.

Marty tracks down Weems at a rave, who tells him that Ledoux cooks meth for a biker gang out of East Texas called the Iron Crusaders. Marty then drunkenly visits Maggie at the hospital where she works and causes a scene, prompting Maggie to call Rust to retrieve him.

Rust tells Marty he worked the Iron Crusaders when he was undercover. Rust begins scheming to get back on the Crusaders' good graces to get information on Ledoux. He gets sick leave from the police department, claiming to plan to go visit his father in Alaska. He steals cocaine from the evidence room and starts faking needle marks. Before he leaves to find the gang members, Rust meets with Maggie at Marty's request to try and convince her to reconcile with Marty.

At a bar frequented by the Iron Crusaders, Rust gets reacquainted with Ginger (Joseph Sikora). Rust asks to be introduced to the gang's meth supplier, which he knows to be Ledoux. Suspicious of Rust's cover story of working with a Mexican cartel, Ginger ropes him into taking part in a raid in another gang's territory, promising to reveal Ledoux after.

Rust and the Iron Crusaders do various drugs before launching their raid, which quickly devolves into a neighborhood-wide gunfight. Rust manages to escape with Ginger. Marty finds them and they leave as the violence in the neighborhood continues.

== Production ==
=== Development ===
In January 2014, the episode's title was revealed as "Who Goes There" and it was announced that series creator Nic Pizzolatto had written the episode while executive producer Cary Joji Fukunaga had directed it. This was Pizzolatto's fourth writing credit, and Fukunaga's fourth directing credit.

=== Filming ===
The episode included a six-minute long take, in which Rust Cohle (Matthew McConaughey) takes part in a raid gone awry. Director Cary Joji Fukunaga already used the technique in his previous films Sin nombre and Jane Eyre, and signed on to direct the series knowing that he would use the technique as well. When he read the script for the episode, he knew that the raid scene would be the one shot in a long take. The crew obtained permission to shoot in a housing project, after which Fukunaga started planning all possible routes to shoot the sequence. Fukunaga commented, "Even the action, the stunt sequences were complicated. We're working on a television schedule. It isn't like a film where you can spend a lot of time working the stunts out with the actors. We only had a day and a half to get Matthew and everyone else on the same page."

The most difficult scene to film involved Cohle and Ginger climbing over a chain-link fence. As the crew wasn't allowed to tear apart the fence, many options were considered. Eventually, they settled on the Steadicam operator being placed on an elevated jib to help them film the sequence. In total, the six-minute sequence was shot seven times, with the first three being discarded for its inefficient execution. During filming, Fukunaga filmed possible spots so he could include two takes if the long take wasn't possible, but the final cut consists of a real long take.

In 2018, Fukunaga revealed that Pizzolatto wanted to cut up the sequence during post-production, explaining "He did not like that I was pushing for that one at all. I mean, there's nothing really that inventive about [True Detective]. It's just another crime drama. Let's do something fun."

== Reception ==
=== Viewers ===
The episode was watched by 1.99 million viewers, earning a 0.8 in the 18-49 rating demographics on the Nielson ratings scale. This means that 0.8 percent of all households with televisions watched the episode. This was a slight increase from the previous episode, which was watched by 1.93 million viewers with a 0.8 in the 18-49 demographics.

=== Critical reviews ===
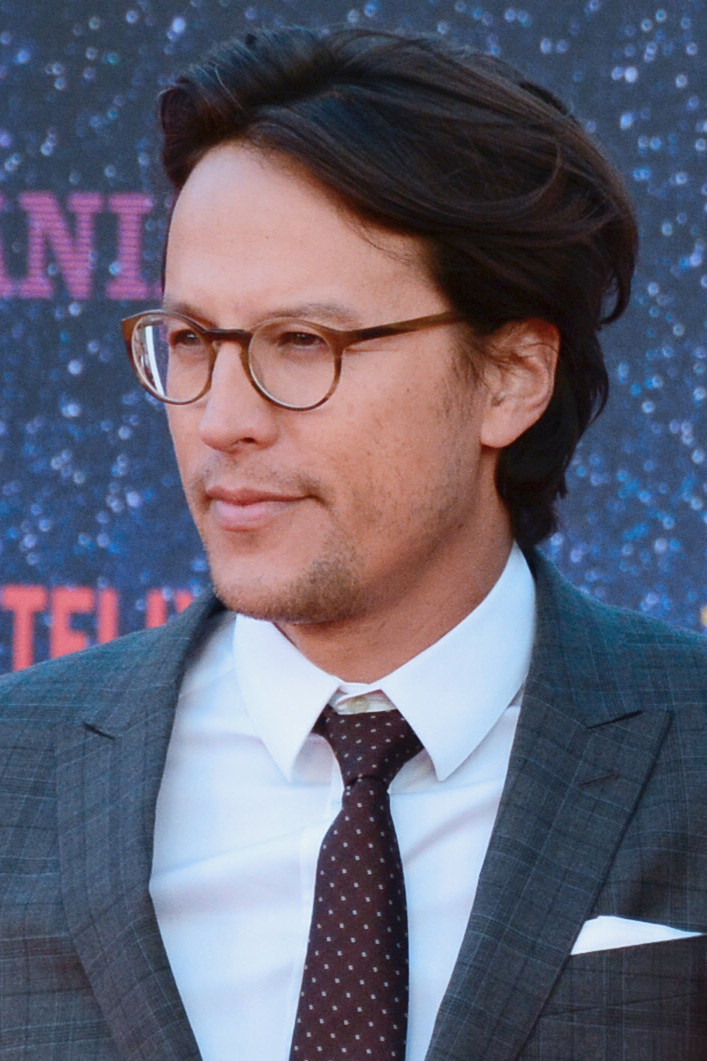
For the episode, Cary Joji Fukunaga received the Award for Outstanding Directing for a Drama Series at the 66th Primetime Emmy Awards.

"Who Goes There" received critical acclaim. Jim Vejvoda of IGN gave the episode an "amazing" 9.2 out of 10 and wrote in his verdict, "Hart's lies finally catch up to him even as more lies are needed to be told in order for him and Cohle to track down the prime suspect in Dora Lange's murder. This ultimately tense and violent episode, the halfway point of the series, sees Cohle go undercover and bloody mayhem ensue."

Erik Adams of The A.V. Club gave the episode an "A" grade and wrote, "But boy howdy — we might not see another sequence of such sustained tension on our TVs in 2014. This is the crowning achievement of Cary Fukunaga's True Detective direction thus far: A six-minute, unbroken tracking shot following Rust's participation in the Iron Crusaders' raid gone bad. From the backseat of the biker gang's truck to the rear of Marty's squad car, it's a nail-biter — a signature moment for the series that isn't Tumblr-parody-ready." Britt Hayes of Screen Crush wrote, "Like Rust, 'Who Goes There' goes off the rails a bit tonight, devolving into a totally different kind of show -- not that this is entirely a bad thing. There's this dark, frenetic energy to the back half, and if there's one complaint it's that Marty gets short-changed a bit and that by the end of the episode we still don't have our guy... which dashes my hopes that Rust and Marty are going to be teaming up in present day any time soon. McConaughey is on fire tonight, though, totally ruling the episode from beginning to end."

Alan Sepinwall of HitFix wrote, "But beyond that one sequence, 'Who Goes There' is an impressive visual example of what's been a gorgeous series to date. The plot is already constructed in a puzzle box fashion, as all the characters in 2012 know more than we do, and as we're given information and certain events out of order, and it's lovely to see the visuals presented the same way at times." Gwilym Mumford of The Guardian wrote, "Rather than learn more about the masked man at the end of episode three, we make a left turn into east Texan biker gangs – but far from being padding, the episode leads to the season's most electric and daring scene yet." Kevin Jagernauth of IndieWire gave the episode an "A" grade and wrote, "What else can be said about the finale without dipping into hyberbole? Over the hump and heading into the last four episodes, True Detective is running on a high that few shows can claim even well into a few seasons. Of course, it will be all about sticking the landing, but on its own, 'Who Goes There' is the best episode of the season so far, hands down."

James Poniewozik of TIME wrote, "It was one of the most amazing scenes you're likely to see on TV all year, and yet the episode wasn't quite done. As Marty peeled off from the crime scene, there was another shift in perspective, an overhead shot that pulled revealed a full-on police assault, a helicopter wheeling into position below us. It was as if we had dived into some murky, surreal deep sea with Cohle, and we were now rising up, up, back to the surface, where finally, we could breathe again." Kenny Herzog of Vulture gave the episode a 4 star rating out of 5 and wrote, "All of which brings us to True Detective's halfway point, and the fair task of figuring out just what it is we know: A prostitute is dead, some kind of Satanic cult with a spiral tattoo as calling card is sacrificing myriad victims, massive meth cooker Reggie Ledoux is not entirely uninvolved, and Hart and Cohle are two typically damaged detectives rooming together in 1995 and feeding each other's obsessions as the improbable end result of stupidity and circumstance. Oh, and that Hart has whiskey dick." Tony Sokol of Den of Geek gave the episode a 4 star rating out of 5 and wrote, "Matthew McConaughey cuts loose on Cohle in the projects, or whatever the projects are called in Louisiana. I was so confused I'd almost ask Det. Maynard Gilbough and Detective Shinn what was going on? Why did he keep punching the guy who brought him there? Who did he shoot to get out of there? That was probably my bad. Did they say 'my bad' yet in the early nineties? Buy me a drink and I'll tell you."

Matt Richenthal of TV Fanatic gave the episode a 4.1 star rating out of 5 and wrote, "Overall, one of the best aspects of True Detective is that I have no clue where it's going to end up. We didn't spend much time in 2012 this week, but we know a new serial killer is on the loose. Or that the old one was never actually found. And we know Marty and Rust had a major falling out." Shane Ryan of Paste gave the episode a 9.8 out of 10 and wrote, "Cary Joji Fukunaga. I wanted to lead with that name, because when we talk about True Detective, we don't say it enough. We say 'Matthew McConaughey' and we say 'Woody Harrelson' and we say 'Nic Pizzolatto', and we're not wrong. In fact, we're really, really right. But we've been looking at three sides of a square and mistaking it for a triangle. We've seen the unity, the duality and the trinity, and maybe that was the most we could hope to consider in three episodes. Because, really, who's ever heard of a quaternity? Who looks at a dense forest full of massive trunks and crawling vines and leafy canopies, and says, 'man, that soil must be fertile as hell'? Who watches great actors enlivened by great writing and wastes a thought on the director? Not us. Not yet."

=== Accolades ===
For the episode, Cary Joji Fukunaga won Outstanding Directing for a Drama Series at the 66th Primetime Emmy Awards.

TVLine named Woody Harrelson the "Performer of the Week" for the week of February 9, 2014, for his performance in the episode. The site wrote, "In the wake of an episode that ends with a nail-biting, completely bananas shootout/hostage situation/nighttime escape — captured with an epic, six-minute tracking shot — we still can't shake the equally stirring but far quieter work of Woody Harrelson as a deeply flawed husband coming to grips with the sudden but inevitable collapse of his marriage."
