= Haunted Houses (True Detective) =

- True Detective episode
- Episode no.: Season 1 Episode 6
- Directed by: Cary Joji Fukunaga
- Written by: Nic Pizzolatto
- Cinematography by: Adam Arkapaw
- Editing by: Affonso Gonçalves
- Original air date: February 23, 2014
- Running time: 58 minutes

Guest appearances
- Paul Ben-Victor as Major Leroy Salter; Jay O. Sanders as Billy Lee Tuttle; Lili Simmons as Beth; Shea Whigham as Pastor Joel Theriot; Gabe Begneaud as Drew Ledger; Kerry Cahill as Nurse; December Ensminger as Kelly Reider; JD Evermore as Detective Lutz; Henry Frost as Steve; Dana Gourrier as Cathleen; Rio Hackford as Bruce; Louis Herthum as Terry Guidry; Anthony Molina as Detective; Erin Moriarty as Audrey Hart; Tom O'Connell as Junior Detective; Daniel Ross Owens as William Mayo; Azure Parsons as Charmaine Boudreaux; Brighton Sharbino as Maisie Hart; Don Yesso as Commander Speece

Episode chronology
← Previous "The Secret Fate of All Life"	Next → "After You've Gone"
- True Detective season 1

"Haunted Houses" is the sixth episode of the first season of the American anthology crime drama television series True Detective. The episode was written by series creator Nic Pizzolatto, and directed by executive producer Cary Joji Fukunaga. It was first broadcast on HBO in the United States on February 23, 2014.

The season focuses on Louisiana State Police homicide detectives Rustin "Rust" Cohle (Matthew McConaughey) and Martin "Marty" Hart (Woody Harrelson), who investigate the murder of prostitute Dora Lange in 1995. Seventeen years later, they must revisit the investigation, along with several other unsolved crimes. In the episode, Cohle decides to investigate on his own anything involving Billy Lee Tuttle's funded schools. Meanwhile, Hart's personal life once again is in turmoil after he starts an affair with a girl he met years ago.

According to Nielsen Media Research, the episode was seen by an estimated 2.64 million household viewers and gained a 1.1 ratings share among adults aged 18–49. The episode received critical acclaim, with critics praising the character development, performances, writing, and directing.

== Plot ==
=== 2002 ===
Marty (Woody Harrelson) visits two men in jail who had sex with Audrey (Erin Moriarty) and makes a deal with them: if they will take a beating from him and agree to stay away from his daughter, he will drop the statutory rape charges. If not, then he will pursue the charges and make sure they are sent to prison, where they will likely be raped by their fellow inmates. The two select the first choice, and Marty beats them badly before letting them go.

Rust (Matthew McConaughey) visits Terry Guidry (Louis Herthum), whose son disappeared. He reveals that his son attended Queen of Angels, a Tuttle-funded school. Rust then visits Pastor Joel Theriot (Shea Whigham), now a disillusioned alcoholic, who mentions that the schools are related to Wellspring, a part of Tuttle's ministries. Theriot claims that when he worked at the ministry, he found evidence of child molestation and brought the information to the deacon, Austin Farrar, who did nothing. He left the school soon after.

Marty and Rust work a case involving a woman suffering from Munchausen by proxy who killed her own children. Rust coaxes a confession out of the woman before encouraging her to take her own life. He tells Marty to type the case report, suggesting that without Rust's skills, Marty would not accomplish much at work. Marty reminds Rust he is the only one to ever give Rust a chance.

Marty goes shopping and runs into Beth (Lili Simmons), a former prostitute and informant now working at T-Mobile. (Note: Previously seen in "Seeing Things" as the teenage prostitute who had kept Dora Lange's diary, who Marty gave money to help her get out of prostitution.) They start an affair, which Maggie (Michelle Monaghan) later discovers by seeing messages on his phone. Though she does not immediately confront him, she is shown at a bar without her wedding ring on, flirting with a man.

Rust visits Kelly Reider (December Ensminger), the girl who was kept in captivity at Ledoux's shed. (Note: As seen in "The Secret Fate of All Life".) Now in a catatonic state, she barely speaks. She tells Rust of a "giant" with a scarred face who was the worst of her torturers; when Rust asks her to describe the man, she suffers a breakdown. Her caretakers ask Rust to leave.

Rust and Marty's superior, Major Leroy Salter (Paul Ben-Victor), reprimands Rust for visiting Reider. Rust creates a connection between the old cases with Tuttle's schools and Dora Lange's murder. Salter and Marty dismiss his claims and Rust is ordered to stop investigating.

Rust ignores the warning and questions Billy Lee Tuttle (Jay O. Sanders), who claims that Austin Farrar was fired for embezzlement before he died in a car accident. Tuttle vaguely promises Rust access to documents belonging to Wellspring, stating that the program will soon reopen. Tuttle reacts blankly and obliquely to Rust's revelation of the true motive for reopening the investigation ("dead women and children"), but he later complains to Salter and Commander Speece (Don Yesso) about the visit and Rust is suspended for one month.

At his apartment, an inebriated Rust is visited by Maggie, who tells him about Marty's infidelity. Intuiting Rust's attraction to her, she initiates sex with him, afterwards telling him she did it to hurt Marty and end her marriage. When Rust realizes he has been merely used as a retribution tool, he angrily kicks her out of his apartment.

Maggie tells Marty about her knowledge of his affair and also confesses to having sex with Rust. The next day, a furious Marty attacks and punches Rust outside their office. Rust reacts in a mostly defensive manner until they are both left bruised and bloodied and have to be restrained by their colleagues. Rust does not press charges and decides to quit the police.

=== 2012 ===
Gilbough (Michael Potts) and Papania (Tory Kittles) bring in Maggie for questioning. She is implied to have divorced Marty soon after his fight with Rust, and has since remarried and now goes by the name Sawyer. Despite their claim that Rust may be involved in suspicious activities, Maggie defends Rust's character and feigns ignorance regarding the circumstances of his and Marty's fallout.

In his own questioning, Marty is asked by the detectives about Tuttle's recent death. The detectives reveal their suspicion that Rust had something to do with it. Marty walks out of the interview. As he is driving, he notices that he is being followed by a car and stops by the road. The driver turns out to be Rust, who wants to talk with him. Marty accepts and both drive off, with Marty checking that his pistol is loaded.

== Production ==
=== Development ===
In January 2014, the episode's title was revealed as "Haunted Houses" and it was announced that series creator Nic Pizzolatto had written the episode while executive producer Cary Joji Fukunaga had directed it. This was Pizzolatto's sixth writing credit, and Fukunaga's sixth directing credit.

== Reception ==
=== Viewers ===
The episode was watched by 2.64 million viewers, earning a 1.1 in the 18-49 rating demographics on the Nielson ratings scale. This means that 1.1 percent of all households with televisions watched the episode. This was a 17% increase from the previous episode, which was watched by 2.25 million viewers with a 0.9 in the 18-49 demographics.

=== Critical reviews ===
"Haunted Houses" received critical acclaim. Jim Vejvoda of IGN gave the episode an "amazing" 9 out of 10 and wrote in his verdict, "We find out why Marty Hart and Rust Cohle had such a bitter falling out in 2002, and finally meet the power player somehow involved in the cult killings, in this fairly by-the-book (but still gripping) episode of True Detective."

Erik Adams of The A.V. Club gave the episode a "B+" grade and wrote, "True Detective is the kind of show that consumes the active viewer, be they a critic who's picking up Easter eggs or just a fan who's passing the time between episodes by jokingly 'casting' season two. I felt this on a profound level while watching 'Haunted Houses', which isn't the first season's best episode, but still managed to sink its hooks in me with the placement of one conspicuous corporate trademark." Britt Hayes of Screen Crush wrote, "The final shot shows us the back of Rust's truck, with his tail light still busted out, all these years later, from where Marty hit it during their fight when Marty found out about Rust and Maggie -- it's something Rust could easily get fixed, but it just goes to show that there's some damage you can't ever let go of; it means too much."

Alan Sepinwall of HitFix wrote, "'Haunted Houses', though, demonstrates some of the pitfalls of the structure Pizzolatto's using. It's essentially an hour of filling in the blanks – specifically, what caused the end of Hart's personal and professional marriages. Between oblique references in the 2012 interviews and what we had learned about Cohle and Hart in 1995, almost everything that happened here was something we could already infer (and, in many cases, we did)." Gwilym Mumford of The Guardian wrote, "We finally learned exactly how our detective duo's relationship went south – but bigger issues came to the fore, such as: exactly what was Cohle up to in his years 'off the grid'?" Kevin Jagernauth of IndieWire gave the episode an "A" grade and wrote, "'Haunted Houses' is an evocative title for this week's episodes accurately describing the growing rot we're seeing. The house of the Lord is certainly haunted with the deaths of women and children, the police station is haunted by their own possible ties to the murders, the former marriage of Maggie and Martin still haunts them a decade later, and of course, Rust is just plain haunted by everything in his life."

Kenny Herzog of Vulture gave the episode a perfect 5 star rating out of 5 and wrote, "True Detective works as television because of how well it functions as a play, where no matter how big the name, everyone’s there to serve a part. And within that interior drama, a handful of messed-up protagonists search for meaning amid constantly circling misdirection. That could just as well be a metaphor for True Detective itself, and with two chapters remaining, the end's beginning — or the beginning's end — is unbearably near." Tony Sokol of Den of Geek gave the episode a 4.5 star rating out of 5 and wrote, "True Detective shows that Louisiana is filled with conspiracies, large and small. For Marty, Rusty and Maggie lies come easy and everybody sticks to their stories. We can only conjecture as to the lies the new detectives are telling. When the two partners meet at the roadside, those beers they’re off to grab are so they can get their stories together not watch the bar TV. Neither Cohle nor Harte could get through an episode of Dumb Blonds in Cracker Country."

Chris O'Hara of TV Fanatic gave the episode a 4 star rating out of 5 and wrote, "Things should certainly get interesting if they do. First because they both are no longer lawmen, but also as the tail light on Rust's truck illustrated, still broken after all these years since their parking lot fight, there are still plenty of things between them to work out." Shane Ryan of Paste gave the episode a 9.8 out of 10 and wrote, "In weeks past, we've indulged ourselves in symbolism and conjecture, but it's become clear that the truth of the resolution will transcend our theories and hearken back to choices that have been postponed for years. To catch the King in Yellow, Hart and Cohle will have to be more than brilliant — they'll have to be decisive."
