= Yellow King =

Yellow King can refer to:

- The King in Yellow, an anthology of short stories by Robert W. Chambers
- The Yellow King, a figure referenced in True Detective (season 1)
- Yellow Emperor, a legendary emperor of China
