= The Secret Fate of All Life =

- True Detective episode
- Episode no.: Season 1 Episode 5
- Directed by: Cary Joji Fukunaga
- Written by: Nic Pizzolatto
- Cinematography by: Adam Arkapaw
- Editing by: Alex Hall
- Original air date: February 16, 2014
- Running time: 57 minutes

Guest appearances
- Kevin Dunn as Major Ken Quesada; Elizabeth Reaser as Laurie Perkins; Jackson Beals as Detective Mark Daughtry; Christopher Berry as Guy Francis; Joe Chrest as Detective Demma; JD Evermore as Detective Lutz; Dana Gourrier as Cathleen; Charles Halford as Reggie Ledoux; Michael Hartson as Examiner #2; Floyd Herrington as Child #1; Jim Klock Jim Klock as Detective Ted Bertrand; Gretchen Koerner as Examiner #1; Garrett Kruithof as Detective Jimmy Dufrene; Dave Maldonado as Abbeville Sergeant; Harlon Miller as Video Tech; Anthony Molina as Detective; Erin Moriarty as Teenage Audrey Hart; John Neisler as Abbeville Investigator; Ólafur Darri Ólafsson as Dewall Ledoux; Dane Rhodes as Detective Favre; Terence Rosemore as Detective; Brighton Sharbino as Teenage Maisie Hart; Joseph Sikora as Ginger; Madison Wolfe as Young Audrey Hart; Meghan Wolfe as Young Maisie Hart; Don Yesso as Commander Speece

Episode chronology
← Previous "Who Goes There"	Next → "Haunted Houses"
- True Detective season 1

"The Secret Fate of All Life" is the fifth episode of the first season of the American anthology crime drama television series True Detective. The episode was written by series creator Nic Pizzolatto, and directed by executive producer Cary Joji Fukunaga. It was first broadcast on HBO in the United States on February 16, 2014.

The season focuses on Louisiana State Police homicide detectives Rustin "Rust" Cohle (Matthew McConaughey) and Martin "Marty" Hart (Woody Harrelson), who investigate the murder of prostitute Dora Lange in 1995. Seventeen years later, they must revisit the investigation, along with several other unsolved crimes. In the episode, Cohle and Hart find Reggie Ledoux's location and set out to catch him. The events lead to serious repercussions to their careers and personal life.

According to Nielsen Media Research, the episode was seen by an estimated 2.25 million household viewers and gained a 0.9 ratings share among adults aged 18–49. The episode received universal acclaim from critics, who praised the performances, directing, writing and character development. For the episode, Nic Pizzolatto received an Outstanding Writing for a Drama Series nomination at the 66th Primetime Emmy Awards.

== Plot ==
=== 2012 ===
Rust (Matthew McConaughey) and Marty (Woody Harrelson) separately tell Gilbough (Michael Potts) and Papania (Tory Kittles) about their role in a gunfight with Reggie Ledoux and his cousin, claiming that it involved a chaotic shootout where they barely managed to kill both. At some point, Gilbough and Papania tell Rust about his suspected role in multiple murders, showing evidence of him being present. Reverend Tuttle's death - which occurred shortly after Rust returned to Louisiana - is also raising their suspicions, especially as Rust won't let them inspect a storage unit he is keeping. Upset with the accusations, Rust leaves his interview.

Based on their interrogation, Gilbough and Papania tell Marty that Rust may be involved with the killings, citing some coincidences and reserved personality, something that Marty rebuffs. However, as the detectives start piling up more possible scenarios for Rust, Marty starts to wonder about the idea.

=== 1995 ===
At a bar, Ginger (Joseph Sikora) arranges Rust to meet Dewall Ledoux (Ólafur Darri Ólafsson), Ledoux's cousin and meth-cooking partner. Rust tries to get him to change his business but Dewall rejects cooperating with Rust. Rust leaves Ginger tied up in a ditch and joins Marty in tailing DeWall's car to Ledoux's compound in the woods.

Rust and Marty infiltrate the house, arresting Ledoux (Charles Halford) and bringing him outside. As Rust holds Dewall at gunpoint, Marty inspects the house and opens a trailer parked in the house. After seeing its content, he goes outside and kills Ledoux, who was taunting Rust with knowledge of "Carcosa". Dewall tries to escape but is shot by Rust, and accidentally steps on a landmine, killing him. The contents of the trailer turn out to be two children, one of whom was already dead, who were kidnapped and abused in the house. Rust and Marty then start planting evidence in the area to make it appear like a gunfight took place, and that they had shot Ledoux in self-defense. They then leave the area with the children as authorities arrive.

Rust and Marty are hailed as heroes by the media and their own colleagues. Marty is promoted to Detective Sergeant while Rust receives commendations. The events also help Marty with his marriage, with Maggie (Michelle Monaghan) now agreeing to let him spend time with his daughters.

=== 2002 ===
Marty and Maggie are now in a better position with their marriage and often go on double dates with Rust and his new girlfriend, Laurie (Elizabeth Reaser). Rust's reputation also improves among the police department for his ability to get confessions from suspects.

Marty's relationship with his daughters also takes a turn, as Audrey (Erin Moriarty) starts rebelling against her parents. Eventually, Audrey is arrested for having sex with two adult men, an event that angers Marty. During an argument, Marty slaps Audrey, causing friction between his family.

Rust interrogates a murder suspect named Guy Francis (Christopher Berry) and coaxes a confession out of him. Desperate, Francis demands a plea bargain, claiming he knows about the man who killed Dora Lange and suggesting that Rust and Marty failed to capture the real killer. Rust dismisses his claims until Francis mentions The Yellow King. Realizing Francis could be telling the truth, Rust begins to hit him, demanding he give up names. Other officers restrain Rust and remove him from the interrogation room. The next day, Rust and Marty return to get more details from Francis. They find that Francis has killed himself. They are told Francis received a call from his attorney shortly before. Rust and Marty trace the call to a payphone in the middle of nowhere.

Rust visits the tree where Dora Lange was found dead, which is now adorned with twig sculptures, similar to the ones found in Marie Fontenot's playhouse. He then returns to the Light of the Way Academy, finding macabre imagery on the walls and a litany of twig sculptures.

== Production ==
=== Development ===
In January 2014, the episode's title was revealed as "The Secret Fate of All Life" and it was announced that series creator Nic Pizzolatto had written the episode while executive producer Cary Joji Fukunaga had directed it. This was Pizzolatto's fifth writing credit, and Fukunaga's fifth directing credit.

== Reception ==
=== Viewers ===
The episode was watched by 2.25 million viewers, earning a 0.9 in the 18-49 rating demographics on the Nielson ratings scale. This means that 0.9 percent of all households with televisions watched the episode. This was a 13% increase from the previous episode, which was watched by 1.99 million viewers with a 0.8 in the 18-49 demographics.

=== Critical reviews ===
"The Secret Fate of All Life" received universal acclaim. Jim Vejvoda of IGN gave the episode an "amazing" 9.7 out of 10 and wrote in his verdict, "Time, crime, truth and lies are all part of this week's tense, creepy, and revelatory episode of True Detective. Cohle's inner darkness is the focal point, although Hart's certainly shows itself as well. Our trust in them is now in doubt even as questions are raised about other characters and events."

Erik Adams of The A.V. Club gave the episode an "A" grade and wrote, "'The Secret Fate Of All Life' marks another pinnacle of daring for True Detective, and it's a daring that has to make way for some hiccups in momentum. Twin Peaks echoes go beyond 'Lonely Souls'; in the space of 20 minutes, it goes through all the awkward throes, fits, and starts that David Lynch and Mark Frost encountered after they revealed Laura Palmer's killer. But 'The Secret Fate Of All Life' also barrels forward with the force of last week's bravura finale, its last 10 or 15 minutes puling [sic] the show forward with a determination that Twin Peaks didn't find until Agent Cooper followed Windom Earle into the woods." Britt Hayes of Screen Crush wrote, "The final minutes of last week's episode were a technical feat, for sure, but watching Marty shoot LeDoux in the head without hesitation after seeing something shocking and mysterious was an absolute stunner of a moment. Whatever they could possibly show in that container would both never be as horrific and somehow surpass the horror of our imagination, which is a technical feat in its own right."

Alan Sepinwall of HitFix wrote, "I've said in the past that Nic Pizzolatto seems more interested in the story of Cohle and Hart than in the story of this case. But as we draw ever closer to this season's conclusion, the plot and the characterization are starting to come into balance. It's possible that we're not going to truly understand who killed Dora Lange and why until we truly understand Rust and Marty and exactly what they’re capable of." Gwilym Mumford of The Guardian wrote, "A change of pace and then some in this dark and fast-paced episode. But just what is Rust talking about?" Sam Adams of IndieWire wrote, "Before the premiere of HBO's True Detective, writer Nic Pizzolatto told interviewers, 'The aspects of a police procedural don't interest me at all and I'm certainly not interested in serial killers or serial killer stories', which might lead one to wonder why he'd write a police procedural about the hunt for a serial killer. But with the fifth episode, 'The Secret Fate of All Life', the show, and the investigation it's built around, are starting to spiral outward, suggesting a universe, or universes, of alternate possibilities."

Kenny Herzog of Vulture gave the episode a perfect 5 star rating out of 5 and wrote, "Whatever Pizzolatto and Fukunaga are exploring in the friction between modern justice, personal relationships, and aeonian truths, it is resolving itself through a painstaking storytelling metamorphosis. In 'Secret Fate of Life', the build-up results in both closure and cause for anticipation, making the episode's narrative just the right amount to absorb." Tony Sokol of Den of Geek gave the episode a 4.5 star rating out of 5 and wrote, "Time is a flat circle. Everything we do or have ever done, we will do again. Those kids they found in the forest, Cohle thinks they're going to relive that nightmare over and over on some kind of mystical loop. Me? I'm going to watch the episode again. You wanna see something? Get a warrant." Shane Ryan of Paste gave the episode a 9.8 out of 10 and wrote, "We're caught in a masterpiece, and 'The Secrete [sic] Fate of All Life' was to speculation what the acorn is to the oak; both fruit and seed. In a breathless hour, we witnessed the subversion of a standard drama; first the climax, then the resolution, and then the mystery. It was riveting story, and beautiful imagery, and philosophical horror."

=== Accolades ===
For the episode, Nic Pizzolatto received an Outstanding Writing for a Drama Series nomination at the 66th Primetime Emmy Awards.
