= True Detective season 1 =

Season of television series

True Detective
- Season 1
- Blu-ray cover
- Showrunner: Nic Pizzolatto
- Starring: Matthew McConaughey; Woody Harrelson; Michelle Monaghan; Michael Potts; Tory Kittles
- No. of episodes: 8

Release
- Original network: HBO
- Original release: January 12 – March 9, 2014

Season chronology
- Next → Season 2

The first season of True Detective, an American anthology crime drama television series created by Nic Pizzolatto, aired in eight episodes between January 12 and March 9, 2014 on the premium cable network HBO. Matthew McConaughey and Woody Harrelson lead a five-actor principal cast as Louisiana State Police homicide detectives Rustin "Rust" Cohle and Martin "Marty" Hart. Each True Detective season follows a self-contained story, characterized by distinct sets of characters, settings, and events with shared continuity.

Framed as a nonlinear narrative, True Detective season one explores Cohle and Hart's recollection of their investigation of the murder of Dora Lange from 1995 to 2002. They must revisit the investigation ten years later, as new evidence implicates the perpetrator in a slew of other unsolved murders and disappearances. Subplots in the season center on the men's personal lives.

Pizzolatto initially conceived True Detective as a novel, but pursued a television concept because of the story's shifts in time and perspective. Cary Joji Fukunaga directed the episodes, each funded with a $4–4.5 million budget and tax subsidies from the Louisiana state government. Filming for the season began in January 2013 and finished that June. True Detective season one has been read as work that examines philosophical pessimism, Christianity, and masculinity. Further discourse addresses the story's comic and horror fiction influences, the show's artistic merits under the framework of auteur theory, and its depiction of women.

True Detective season one received highly positive reviews in the media. Critics praised the show as one of the strongest dramas of the year, but occasionally criticized some aspects of the writing such as characterization. It was a candidate for numerous awards, including a Primetime Emmy Award nomination for Outstanding Drama Series and a Golden Globe Award for Best Miniseries or Television Film, and won several other honors for writing, cinematography, direction, and acting.

== Episodes ==
No. overall	No. in season	Title	Directed by	Written by	Original release date	U.S. viewers (millions)
1	1	"The Long Bright Dark"	Cary Joji Fukunaga	Nic Pizzolatto	January 12, 2014	2.33
On January 3, 1995, Louisiana homicide detectives Martin "Marty" Hart and Rustin "Rust" Cohle investigate the murder of Dora Lange, a prostitute found posed in prayer beneath a tree near Erath, crowned with deer antlers and surrounded by twig sculptures resembling Cajun bird traps. Marty invites Rust to dinner at his wife Maggie's insistence, where a drunken Rust discusses his daughter's death. Lange's ex-husband Charlie reveals that she had spoken of meeting a "king." Investigating in Erath, the detectives uncover the five-year-old disappearance of a child named Marie Fontenot, and a report of another child pursued by a "green-eared spaghetti monster". The two interview Marie's uncle and his sister at the Fontenot family home; inside Marie's abandoned playhouse, Rust discovers another apparently recent twig sculpture. In May 2012, Marty and Rust are separately questioned about the Lange investigation by detectives Thomas Papania and Maynard Gilbough. The former partners have not spoken since an altercation in 2002. A recent murder bears striking similarities to Lange's, raising doubts about whether Marty and Rust actually caught the killer in 1995.
2	2	"Seeing Things"	Cary Joji Fukunaga	Nic Pizzolatto	January 19, 2014	1.67
In 1995, tensions rise between Marty and Rust after Rust alludes to Marty's affair with a younger colleague. Reverend Billy Lee Tuttle, an influential evangelist and cousin of Louisiana's governor, pushes for an "anti-Christian crimes" task force to take over the Dora Lange investigation. Marty and Rust secure additional time to pursue leads, which bring them to The Ranch, a rural brothel employing runaway girls where Dora used to live and work. A friend of Dora's provides her diary, containing references to "Carcosa" and the "Yellow King". Rust theorizes that Lange's killer addicted her to methamphetamine and LSD to induce hallucinations. At a burned-out church Lange attended, they discover a mural depicting a human figure wearing deer antlers. In 2012, Rust recounts how his daughter's accidental death destroyed his marriage and led to four years working undercover in narcotics. Following a deadly gunfight and psychiatric hospitalization, he transferred to homicide in Louisiana and partnered with Marty. Rust also reveals that prolonged drug use left him with intermittent visual hallucinations, which he is shown to occasionally experience in 1995. Meanwhile, Marty is divorced from Maggie for undisclosed reasons.
3	3	"The Locked Room"	Cary Joji Fukunaga	Nic Pizzolatto	January 26, 2014	1.93
In 1995, Marty and Rust learn from pastor Joel Theriot that Dora Lange was seen attending church with a tall, facially scarred man. Despite pressure to surrender the investigation to Tuttle's task force, they continue pursuing leads. Meanwhile, Marty becomes enraged after discovering his mistress Lisa with another man. Rust uncovers similarities between Lange's murder and the supposedly accidental death of a young girl named Rianne Olivier. The detectives visit Light of the Way Academy, a religious school operated by Tuttle that Olivier attended, finding it abandoned except for a groundskeeper whom Rust questions. They discover that Olivier's boyfriend, ex-convict Reggie Ledoux, shared a prison cell with Lange's ex-husband Charlie, prompting them to issue an APB for Ledoux. In 2012, Marty and Rust's separate interviews continue, exposing Marty's self-serving moral outlook and Rust's nihilistic philosophy about humanity and the essential futility of life.
4	4	"Who Goes There"	Cary Joji Fukunaga	Nic Pizzolatto	February 9, 2014	1.99
In 1995, Charlie Lange admits showing Ledoux photographs of Dora. Marty learns that Ledoux supplies methamphetamine exclusively to the Iron Crusaders, an East Texas biker gang with whom Rust has connections from his undercover days. Rust takes leave to infiltrate the gang, falsely claiming he must visit his dying father in Alaska. Meanwhile, Lisa exposes Marty's affair to Maggie, who forces him to leave their home. Rust recruits Marty to assist with his infiltration. Reconnecting with the Crusaders under his former alias "Crash", Rust meets Ginger, an enforcer and former acquaintance who promises access to Ledoux's meth supply in exchange for helping rob a rival gang. The robbery quickly goes sideways and turns violent; Rust kidnaps Ginger in the chaos and narrowly escapes with Marty's help. In 2012, Marty and Rust conceal their involvement with the Iron Crusaders from Papania and Gilbough, maintaining their fabricated account that Rust took leave to visit his father in Alaska.
5	5	"The Secret Fate of All Life"	Cary Joji Fukunaga	Nic Pizzolatto	February 16, 2014	2.25
In 1995, Ginger introduces Rust to Dewall Ledoux, Reggie's cousin and meth-cooking partner. Dewall refuses to do business with Rust and leaves; Rust and Marty follow him to their bayou lab. They apprehend Reggie, who mentions "Carcosa", but Marty kills him in rage after discovering two kidnapped, abused children. Dewall dies fleeing into a booby trap. Rust and Marty stage a shootout to conceal the killings, earning public acclaim and promotions. By 2002, Marty and Maggie have reconciled, and Rust is dating again. During an interrogation, a prisoner claims to Rust that Dora Lange's killer remains active, mentioning the "Yellow King" and offering information in exchange for a plea bargain. However, he commits suicide before Rust can follow up. Revisiting Lange's murder site and Light of the Way Academy, Rust discovers more twig sculptures and disturbing imagery resembling earlier evidence. In 2012, Marty and Rust maintain their fabricated account of the Ledoux deaths during separate interviews with Papania and Gilbough. The detectives reveal their suspicion that Rust orchestrated the murders, having seemingly guided Marty toward every clue. They also implicate him in Billy Lee Tuttle's suspicious death in 2010, coinciding with Rust's return to Louisiana. Rust leaves the interview after being accused.
6	6	"Haunted Houses"	Cary Joji Fukunaga	Nic Pizzolatto	February 23, 2014	2.64
In 2002, Rust connects missing persons cases to Tuttle-funded schools and learns from ex-pastor Theriot that Tuttle allegedly concealed child molestation. Ledoux's surviving victim Kelly Reider, suffering from regressive catatonia, recalls a third attacker: a giant, scarred man. She becomes hysterical when Rust questions her further. After confronting Tuttle, Rust is suspended for continuing his unauthorized investigation. Meanwhile, Marty encounters Beth, a former underage prostitute from The Ranch, at a T-Mobile store, and begins an affair with her. Upon discovering his infidelity, Maggie seduces a drunken Rust and has sex with him. She subsequently tells Marty, provoking a violent confrontation between the partners at the police station. Rust resigns immediately afterward. In 2012, Papania and Gilbough interview Maggie, now remarried to a wealthy man, but she evades their questions. Marty abandons his interview after the detectives accuse Rust of involvement in the murders. Despite their fallout in 2002, Rust approaches Marty, and the former partners agree to meet.
7	7	"After You've Gone"	Cary Joji Fukunaga	Nic Pizzolatto	March 2, 2014	2.34
In 2012, Rust presents Marty with evidence of a cult resembling Courir de Mardi Gras, which he believes is responsible for numerous disappearances along Louisiana's coast. Among his findings is a videotape stolen from Reverend Tuttle's safe, depicting masked men ritualistically raping and murdering Marie Fontenot. Rust denies killing Tuttle, suggesting others murdered him to prevent blackmail over the recording. Marty agrees to help, horrified by the footage and regretful over killing Reggie Ledoux in 1995, realizing that his actions prevented them from uncovering the wider conspiracy. They discover that Tuttle had an illegitimate half-brother named William Childress, who inflicted severe facial burns on his son. They also learn that former colleague Steve Geraci was ordered by then-sheriff Ted Childress to abandon the Fontenot investigation. Marty and Rust kidnap Geraci to interrogate him about his involvement in the cover-up. Meanwhile, Papania and Gilbough encounter the groundskeeper Rust questioned at Light of the Way Academy in 1995. He directs them toward the burned-out church, but they depart without noticing his heavily scarred lower face.
8	8	"Form and Void"	Cary Joji Fukunaga	Nic Pizzolatto	March 9, 2014	3.52
In 2012, the scarred man, Errol Childress lives in squalor with a female relative with whom he has an incestuous relationship, while working as a school painter. Marty and Rust interrogate Geraci using the Fontenot tape but deem him uninvolved with the wider conspiracy. Marty deduces that the "green-eared spaghetti monster" was a painter covered in green paint, leading them to William Childress' landscaping business, which employed a scarred man. At Childress's home, Rust pursues Errol through Carcosa, a labyrinthine temple where the cult performed its sacrifices. Arriving upon a chamber containing an effigy of the "Yellow King", Rust hallucinates a cosmic vortex before Errol stabs him. Marty intervenes, but Errol overpowers both detectives. Before Errol can kill Marty, Rust shoots him dead; Papania and Gilbough arrive with backup and rescue Rust and Marty. Recovering in the hospital, they learn that Errol is linked to numerous murders and disappearances, with bodies discovered on his property. The Tuttles evade prosecution but face public disgrace. Marty breaks down when Maggie and their daughters visit. Rust becomes emotional when reflecting to Marty about his near-death experience, and expresses newfound optimism about the struggle between light and darkness.

== Cast ==
=== Main cast ===
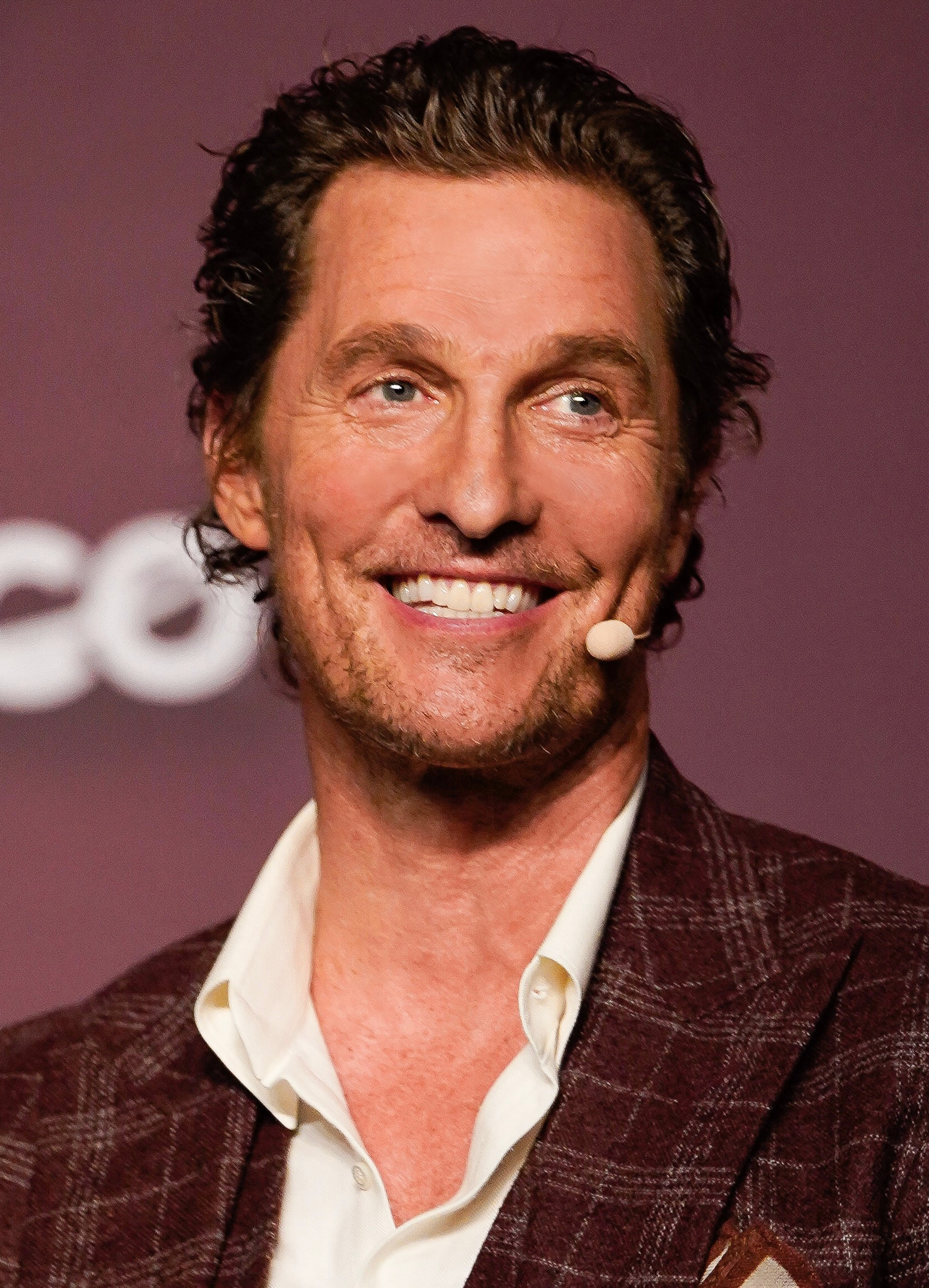
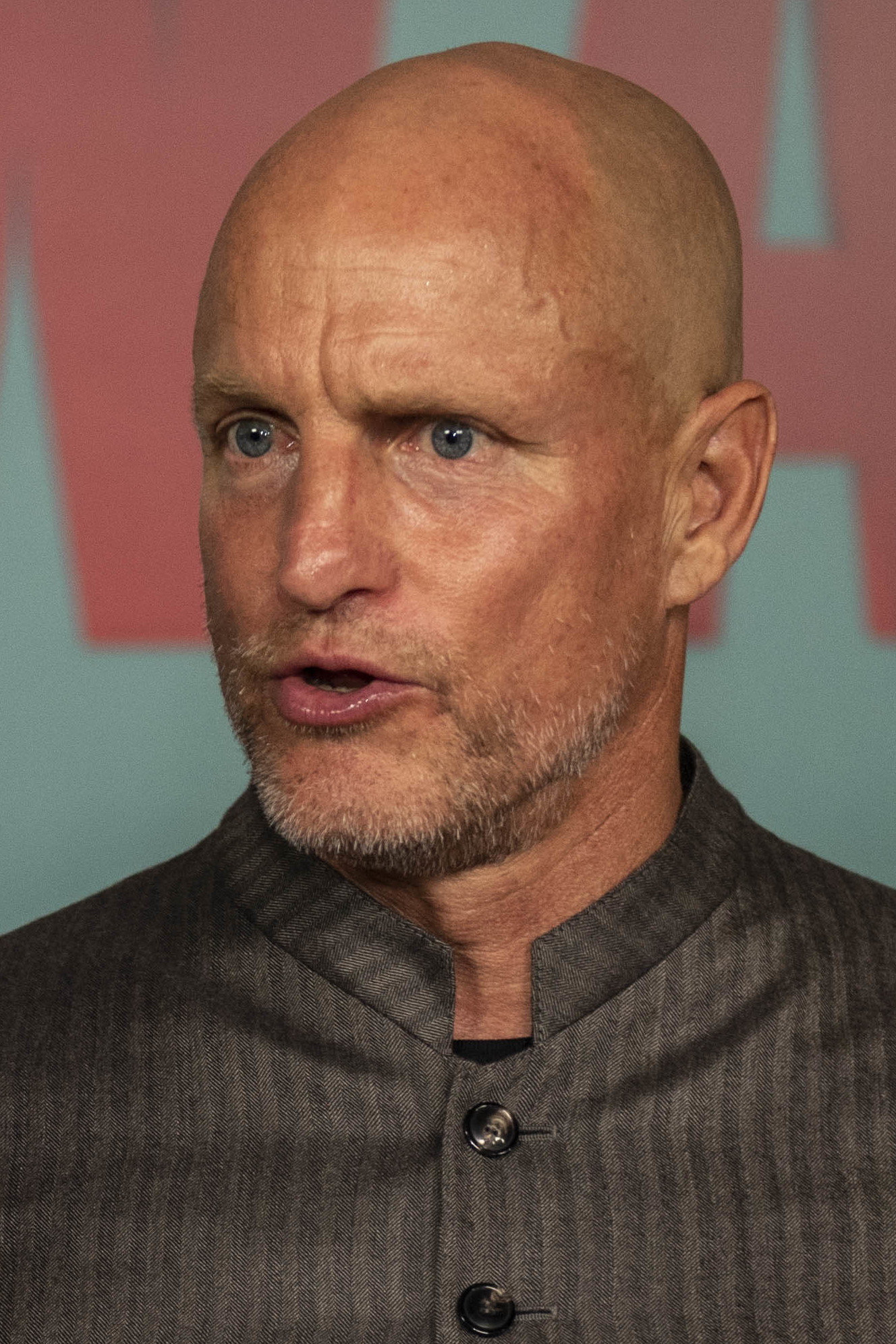
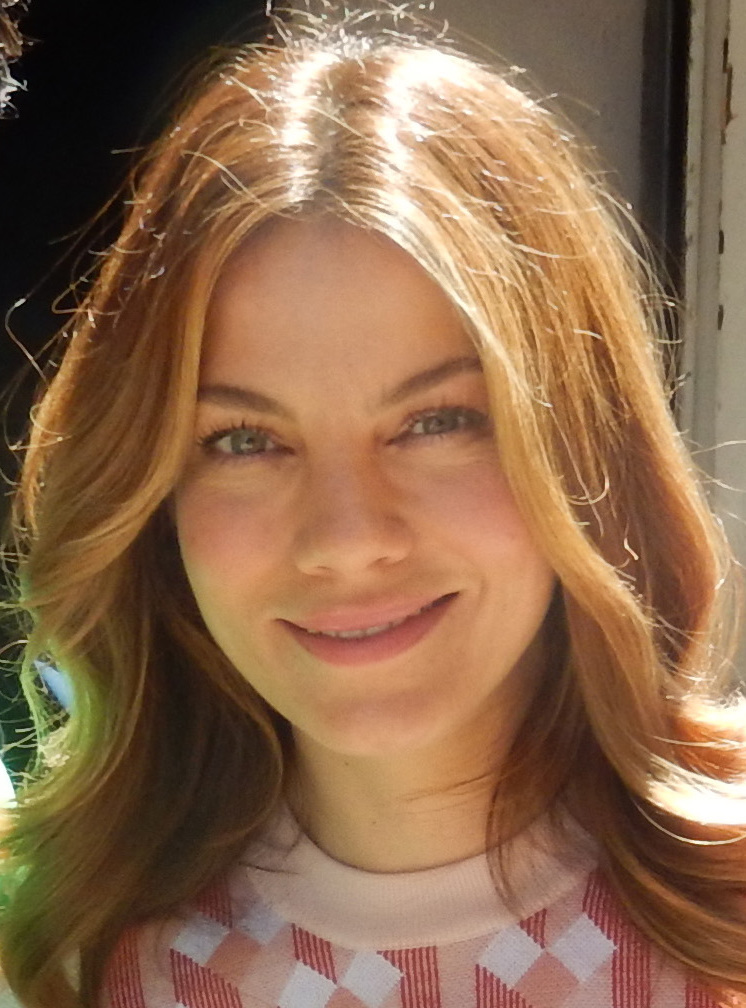
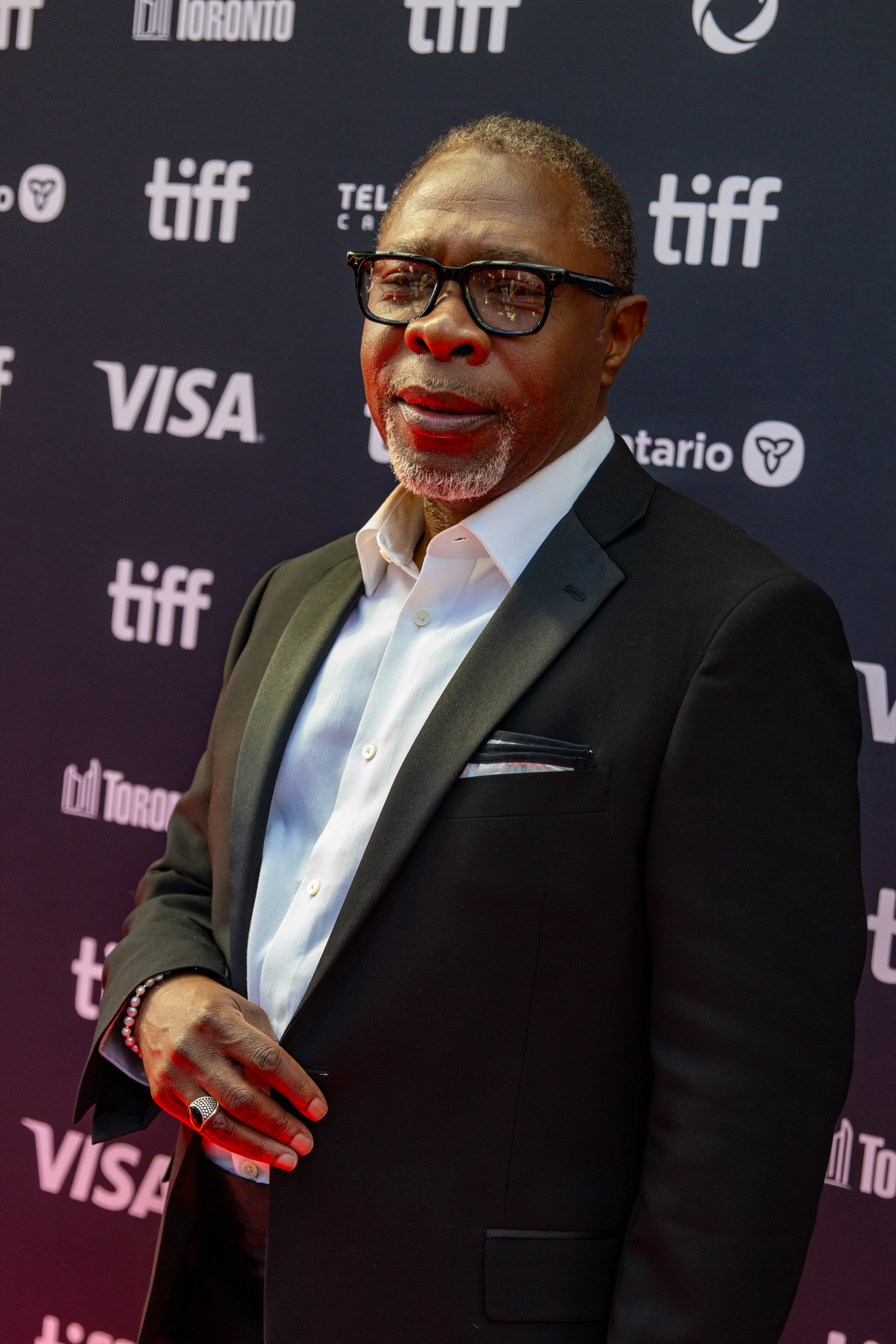
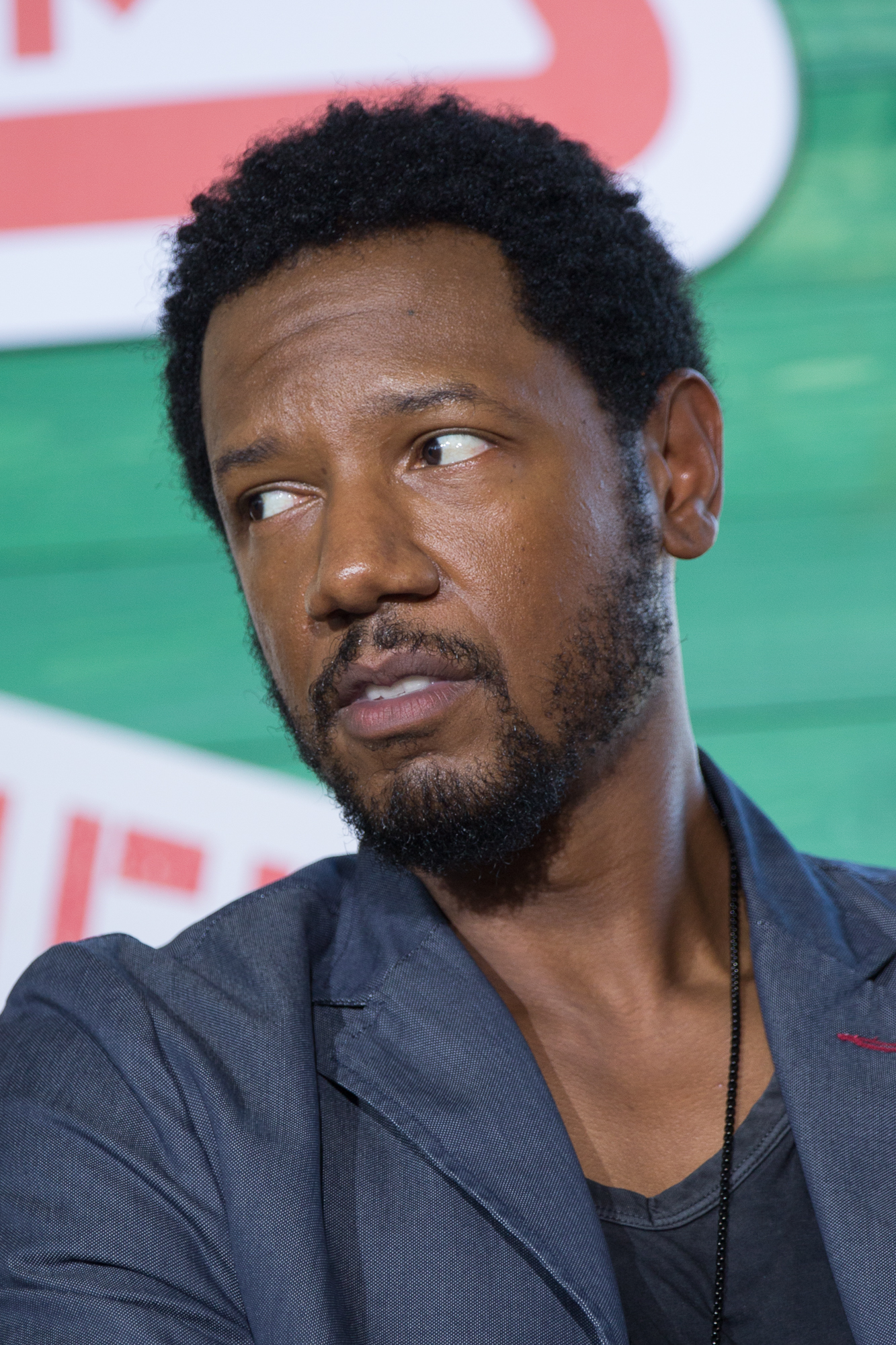
Main cast from left to right: Matthew McConaughey (pictured in 2019), Woody Harrelson (2019), Michelle Monaghan (2015), Michael Potts (2024), and Tory Kittles (2016)
- Matthew McConaughey as Detective Rustin "Rust" Cohle, a troubled, nihilistic state police detective and Hart's partner
- Woody Harrelson as Detective Martin "Marty" Hart, a state police detective and Cohle's partner
- Michelle Monaghan as Maggie Hart (née Hebert, later Sawyer), Hart's wife, later divorced
- Michael Potts as Detective Maynard Gilbough, a state police detective interviewing Hart and Cohle seventeen years after the murder of Dora Lange
- Tory Kittles as Detective Thomas Papania, a state police detective interviewing Hart and Cohle seventeen years after the murder of Dora Lange

=== Recurring and guest ===
- Kevin Dunn as Major Ken Quesada, Hart and Cohle's superior in 1995
- Madison Wolfe as young Audrey Hart, Hart's daughter
  - Erin Moriarty as teenage Audrey Hart
- Meghan Wolfe as young Macie Hart, Hart's daughter
  - Brighton Sharbino as teenage Macie Hart
- Alexandra Daddario as Lisa Tragnetti, a court stenographer with whom Hart has an affair
- Michael Harney as Steve Geraci, Hart and Cohle's colleague, later the sheriff of Louisiana's Iberia parish
- J. D. Evermore as Detective Bobby Lutz, Hart and Cohle's colleague
- Don Yesso as Commander Speece, Hart and Cohle's superior
- Brad Carter as Charlie Lange, Dora Lange's convict ex-husband
- Jay O. Sanders as Billy Lee Tuttle, an influential reverend
- Lili Simmons as Beth, a young prostitute who knew Dora Lange
- Shea Whigham as Joel Theriot, a traveling minister
- Glenn Fleshler as Errol Childress, a groundskeeper at one of Tuttle's academies
- Charles Halford as Reggie Ledoux, a drug producer
- Joseph Sikora as Ginger, a member of the Iron Crusaders biker gang who has ties to Cohle
- Ólafur Darri Ólafsson as DeWall LeDoux, Reggie's cousin and cook partner
- Elizabeth Reaser as Laurie Perkins, a woman Cohle becomes involved with
- Paul Ben-Victor as Major Leroy Salter, Hart and Cohle's superior in 2002
- Ann Dowd as Betty Childress, Errol's half-sister

== Production ==
=== Conception ===
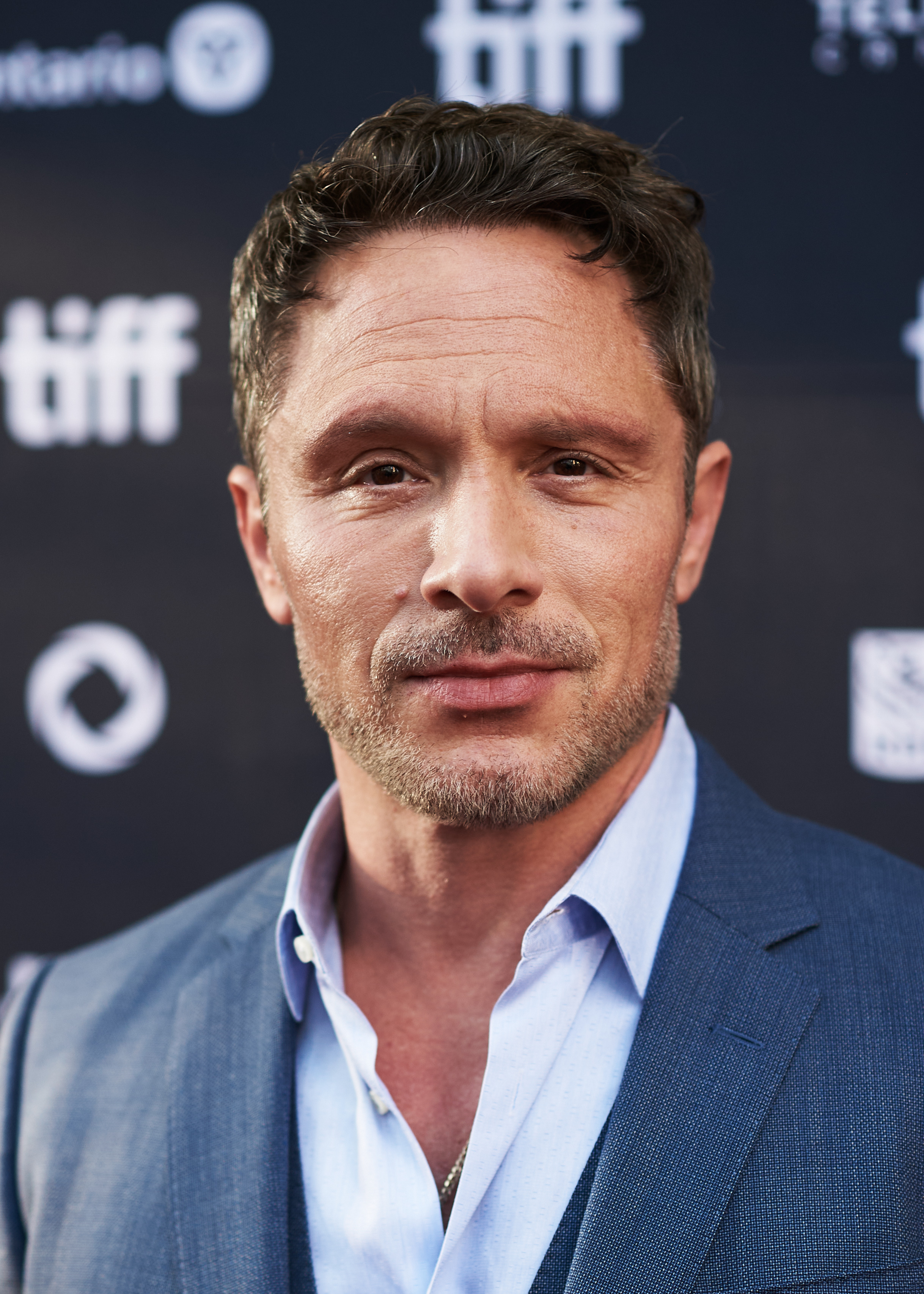
Nic Pizzolatto in 2025

Before creating True Detective, Nic Pizzolatto taught at the University of North Carolina at Chapel Hill, DePauw University, and the University of Chicago. His first commercial writing venture was a short story collection he published as Between Here and the Yellow Sea in 2006, inspired by HBO's series The Wire, The Sopranos, and Deadwood. After following up with a novel, Galveston, in 2010, he began concentrating on television writing. His earlier attempts at scriptwriting were unsuccessful because of a lack of money. Pizzolatto obtained his first major TV gig as a screenwriter for AMC's series The Killing in 2011. He credits the show with giving him a glimpse of the inner workings of the television industry. Pizzolatto grew increasingly dissatisfied with the series' creative direction, and left two weeks into staff writing sessions for its second season.

True Detective was intended to be a novel, but once the project took definite form, Pizzolatto thought the narrative's shifts in time and perspective made it more suitable for television. He pitched an adaptation of Galveston, and from May to July 2010 he developed six screenplays, including an early, 90-page draft of the True Detective pilot script. Pizzolatto secured a development deal with HBO for a potential pilot series shortly thereafter. He wrote a second True Detective script soon after his departure from The Killing thanks to the support of production company and manager Anonymous Content, which ultimately produced and developed the project in-house. By April 2012, following a heated bidding period, HBO commissioned eight episodes of True Detective, with a budget of $4–4.5 million per episode. Pizzolatto did not hire a writing staff because he believed a collaborative approach would not work with his isolated, novelistic process, and that a group would not achieve his desired result. After working alone for about three months, the final copy of the project script was 500 pages long.

=== Cast and crew ===
As an anthology, each True Detective season follows a self-contained narrative, characterized by distinct sets of characters, settings, and events with shared continuity. Pizzolatto began contemplating the lead roles while he was pitching the series to networks in early 2012. True Detective's anthology format required actors to commit to only a single season, so Pizzolatto was able to attract film stars who normally avoid television series because of their busy schedules. Woody Harrelson and Matthew McConaughey were among the actors Pizzolatto considered for star billing. McConaughey, who had recently finished filming Killer Joe (2011), was contracted well before HBO commissioned the season. Impressed with his performance in The Lincoln Lawyer (2011), Pizzolatto at first assigned him to play Hart, but McConaughey convinced him to give him the part of Cohle. When asked in a Variety interview about his decision to switch parts, the actor replied, "I wanted to get in that dude's head. The obsession, the island of a man—I'm always looking for a guy who monologues. It's something really important as I feel I'm going into my better work." To prepare for the role, McConaughey created a 450-page analysis—the "Four Stages of Rustin Cohle"—to study his character's evolution during the season.

Harrelson was the season's next significant casting choice, brought on to play Hart at McConaughey's request. Harrelson stated that he joined True Detective partly because he wanted to work with certain people involved in the project, with whom he had previously collaborated in the 2012 HBO film Game Change. Michelle Monaghan agreed to play the season's female lead, Maggie, because she felt compelled by the direction of the plot and her character's story arc. Michael Potts and Tory Kittles completed the principal cast, playing detectives Maynard Gilbough and Thomas Papania, respectively. Major supporting roles in True Detective's first season include Kevin Dunn as Major Ken Quesada, Alexandra Daddario as Lisa Tragnetti, and Brad Carter as Charlie Lange.

Pizzolatto narrowed his search for a suitable director to Cary Joji Fukunaga, whom he knew from Anonymous Content, and Alejandro González Iñárritu. Fukunaga was formally appointed as director after Iñárritu pulled out of the project due to film commitments. In preparation for his work on the series, Fukunaga spent time with a homicide detective of the Louisiana State Police's Criminal Investigations Division to develop an accurate depiction of a 1990s homicide detective's work. Fukunaga recruited Adam Arkapaw, director of photography of Top of the Lake, as project cinematographer. Arkapaw came to the director's attention for his work in Animal Kingdom (2010) and Snowtown (2011), and was hired after the two negotiated a deal at a meeting in San Francisco. Alex DiGerlando, whom Fukunaga had worked with on Benh Zeitlin's Glory at Sea in 2008, was appointed as the production designer. Fukunaga said in an interview, "I knew what Alex accomplished in the swamps of Louisiana and given some money, how much more amazing he could be in building sets that would just be used for one or two days and be abandoned again."

=== Filming ===
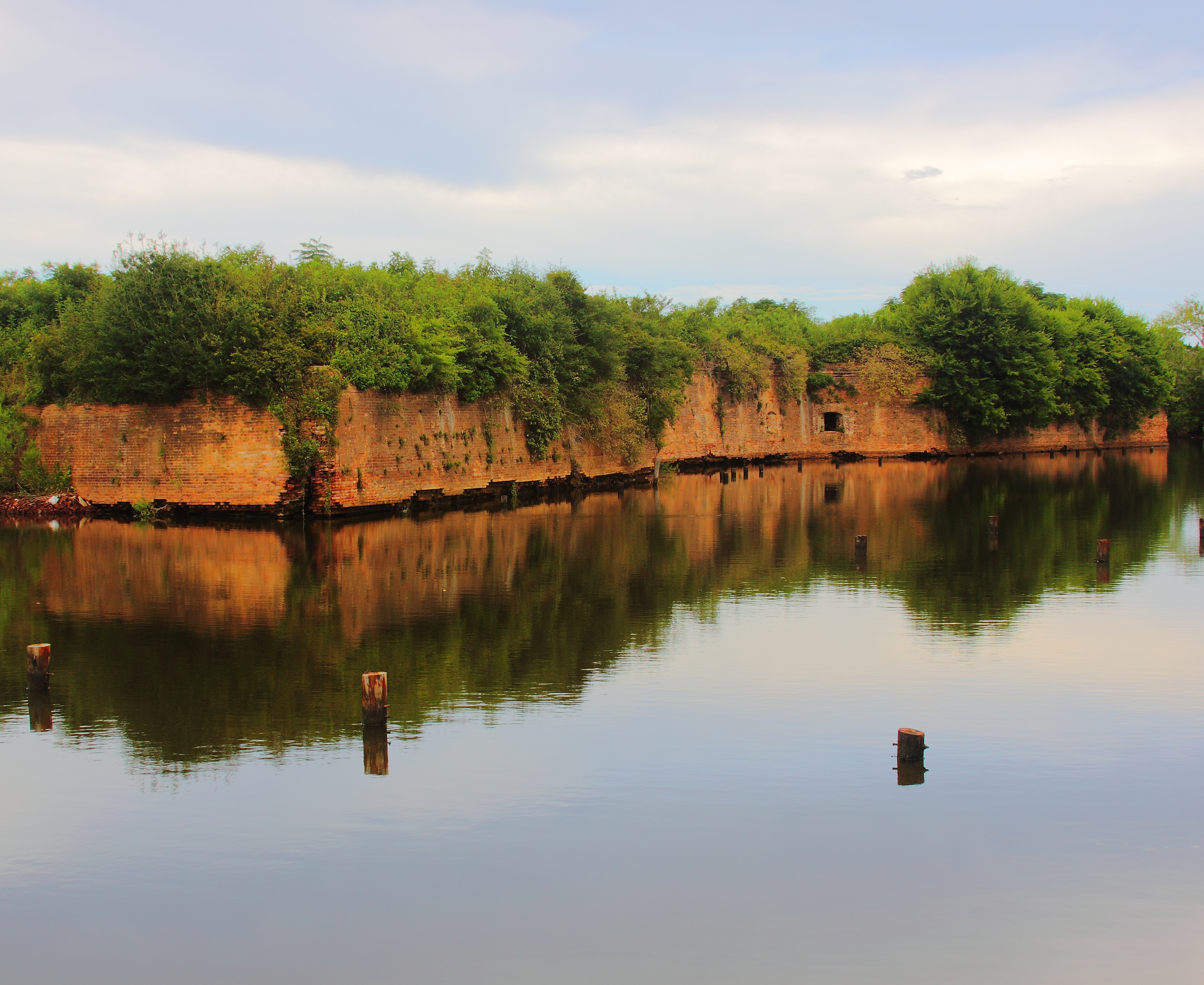
Ruins of Fort Macomb (pictured in 2016), one of the filming locations in True Detective season one.

HBO chose to film in Louisiana over Pizzolatto's original preference for Arkansas, as the state offered transferrable tax credits to subsidize the cost of production for all eligible shoots. Pizzolatto was also compelled by the industrial setting as a storytelling device: "There's a contradictory nature to the place and a sort of sinister quality underneath it all ... everything lives under layers of concealment. The woods are thick and dark and impenetrable. On the other hand you have the beauty of it all from a distance."

Principal photography took three months (between 100 and 110 days), from January to June 2013, with approximately five minutes of film shot per day. Production staff constructed various set pieces, among them a scorched chapel, Joel Theriot's tent revival, and the Louisiana State Criminal Investigations Division offices, the last of which they built inside an abandoned light bulb warehouse near Elmwood. For the Dora Lange crime scene, the crew filmed exterior shots at a remote sugarcane field which, because it was partially burned, inspired what DiGerlando called a "moody and atmospheric" backdrop for the corresponding interior scenes.

The scene in which Cohle, taking Ginger hostage, escapes a housing complex amidst gunfire, was captured in Bridge City as a single six-minute tracking shot, a technique Fukunaga had employed in Sin Nombre (2009) and Jane Eyre (2011). Shot in seven takes, preparation for the scene was extensive and demanding: McConaughey trained with Mark Norby to master a fighting style for his character, and the nature of the shoot required a team of stunt coordinators, make-up artists, and special effects crew on hand during its entire course. Elsewhere, shooting took place at an unoccupied high school campus in Kenner and nineteenth-century Fort Macomb, located outside New Orleans. Former Louisiana State Police Detective Tim Hanks served as technical advisor for the season.

True Detective season one was shot on 35 mm film, which the production staff chose to achieve an authentic "nostalgic" quality. The season was filmed using a Panavision Millennium XL2 camera, and the choice of lens corresponded to the period when a scene took place. Scenes set in 1995 and 2002 were captured with Panavision PVintage lenses, which produced a softer image because they were made of recycled, low-contrast glass. As these scenes were written as a reflection of Cohle and Hart's memory, production sought to make them as cinematic as possible, to reflect what Arkapaw called "the fragmentation of their lucid imaginations back through their past." To achieve this, they relied on wider lenses to exaggerate composition. The 2012 scenes were shot with Panavision Primo lenses: the visual palette in comparison was sharper and had much more contrast, lending a "modern, crisp feeling" to the images, and, according to Arkapaw, pulling "characters out from their environments to hopefully help audiences get inside their heads".

=== Art design ===
The design team used an assortment of low poly meshes to develop a 3D landscape for the show's title sequence, which were later meticulously superimposed. Digital doubles (such as this one of Hart shown in the upper left frame) were created in some cases to allow more texture.

Joshua Walsh was responsible for creating True Detective's artwork. His work for the show consists of over 100 individual "devil's nests"—twig figurines created by the killer—along with wall paintings and miniature sculptures of men made of beer cans, among others. According to DiGerlando, Walsh's interests in hunting and taxidermy made him "the perfect dude for the job". A blueprint for the devil's nests was not well established in the script, other than specifications that the structures be able to stand on their own and feature a spiral motif. DiGerlando and Walsh went with a tripod design that showed a spiral when viewed from the base and contained ladder-like crossing elements that symbolized the killer's desire to ascend to a dark spiritual plane. Each design had subtle differences from one another. DiGerlando cited voodoo art and the work of Henry Darger and James Charles Castle as strong stylistic influences and sought a primitive look for the figurines, one that revealed the workings of a man with "some deep inner urge to express himself". To reflect this, Walsh built devil's nests using mud, secondhand children's clothing, reeds, roots, and other materials he felt the killer would use.

The season's title sequence was a collaboration between director Patrick Clair, his Santa Monica-based studio Elastic, his Sydney-based studio Antibody, and Brisbane-based company Breeder. The design team emphasized southern Louisiana's industrial landscape because it reflected the characters' traits and moral struggles. Clair stated that from the start he had an "unusually clear" vision of True Detective's finished opening sequence. Using Richard Misrach's photography book Petrochemical America (2012) as a template, the production team initially photographed the local scenery, and the resulting images were woven together to form the core of the title sequence. By the time production began animating, they faced several problems: the photographic stills were too grainy and the footage was too jagged. As a result, many shots were digitally altered and slowed to about a tenth of their original speed, which, according to Clair, "evoked a surreal and floaty mood that perfectly captured what we were after."

Creation of a 3D effect required the design team to use an assortment of low-poly meshes, or 3D geometric models. Using a variety of animation and special effects techniques, these images were later superimposed "with painstaking care" to avoid a sterile, digitized look. Clair said, "The most crucial thing to me was that this didn't feel digital, so we went to great lengths to incorporate as much organic imagery as possible." For some stills, the design team created digital doubles to develop more texture. The sequence's final cut was polished using optical glitching and motion distortion techniques. The Sydney Morning Herald included the opening sequence in a list of ten of the best title sequences on television.

=== Music ===
Season one's opening theme is "Far from Any Road", an alternative country song originally composed by The Handsome Family for their 2003 album Singing Bones. The True Detective soundtrack features a compilation of gospel and blues music, which were selected by Pizzolatto and T Bone Burnett. The pair opposed the use of Cajun music and swamp blues for the season's musical score because they felt it was overdone. Burnett said the score was intended to be character-driven, rather than inspired by other crime fiction drama. Songs by Bo Diddley, Melvins, Primus, The Staple Singers, Grinderman, Wu-Tang Clan, Vashti Bunyan, Townes Van Zandt, Juice Newton, and Captain Beefheart appear in season one. Burnett also composed original pieces with Rhiannon Giddens, who used a Swarmatron synthesizer, and Cassandra Wilson. HBO released an abridged soundtrack album, featuring 14 tracks from True Detective's first two seasons, on August 14, 2015, through physical media and iTunes.

== Themes and analysis ==
=== Philosophical pessimism and influences ===
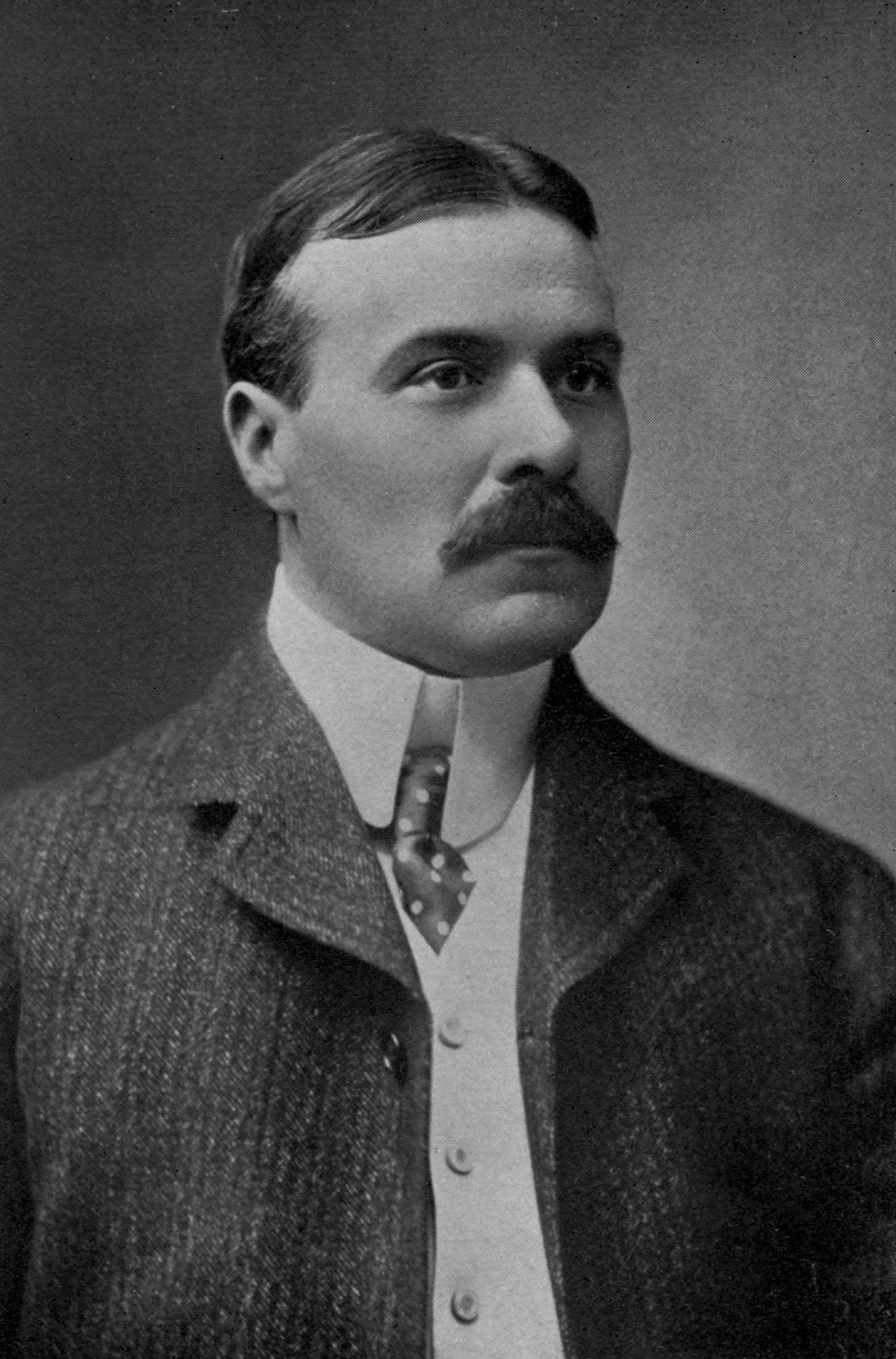
Pizzolatto used Robert W. Chambers' (pictured) The King in Yellow as the backbone for much of the season's story.

Critics have offered many readings of the influence of weird and horror fiction on True Detective's narrative, often examining the influence of Robert W. Chambers' short story collection The King in Yellow (1895) and Thomas Ligotti. Allusions to The King in Yellow can be observed in the show's dark philosophy, its recurring use of "Carcosa" and "The Yellow King" as motifs throughout the series, and its symbolic use of yellow as a thematic signature that signifies insanity and decadence. Pizzolatto was accused of plagiarizing Ligotti because of close similarities between lines in True Detective and text from Ligotti's nonfiction book The Conspiracy Against the Human Race (2010)—accusations Pizzolatto denied, while acknowledging Ligotti's influence.

Other philosophers and writers identified as influences include Arthur Schopenhauer, Friedrich Nietzsche, Gilles Deleuze, Ray Brassier, Emil Cioran, and Eugene Thacker. Mathijs Peters, in a piece for Film International, argued that True Detective probes Schopenhauerian philosophy through its approach to individuality, self-denial, and the battle between dark and light. Ben Woodard noted the show's evolving philosophy, which examines a setting where culture, religion and society are the consequences of biological weakness. Woodward wrote, "Biological programming gets recuperated and socially redistributed visions, faiths, and acerbic personalities take the reins of uncertain ends creating a world where 'people go away'." Even the setting, Fintan Neylan argued, emphasizes a world "where the decrepitude of human ordering cannot be hidden". "This is not a place where hope fled; it is a place where hope could never take root. It is with these people and environs that the real horror is sourced". Neylan observed that Cohle's actions are not motivated by misanthropy, rather a drive to challenge "those who try to either disguise or manipulate this frailty of humans for their own benefit". Cohle ultimately confronts "an entire philosophical history which has taken its task as that of sweeping frailty away". Christopher Orr at The Atlantic said True Detective was "Fincherian in the best sense", a fusion of Se7en (1995) and Zodiac (2007), because of its subject matter, sleek cinematography and "vivid, unsettling" aura.

Some commentators noted further influences from comic book literature. Adams likened Cohle to the protagonist of Alan Moore's The Courtyard and drew parallels with Grant Morrison's The Invisibles for the show's brief exploration of M-theory with one of Cohle's monologues. ComicsAlliance and New York columnist Abraham Riesman cited Top 10 as the inspiration for the season finale based on dialogue from the episode's closing scene.

=== Auteurism ===
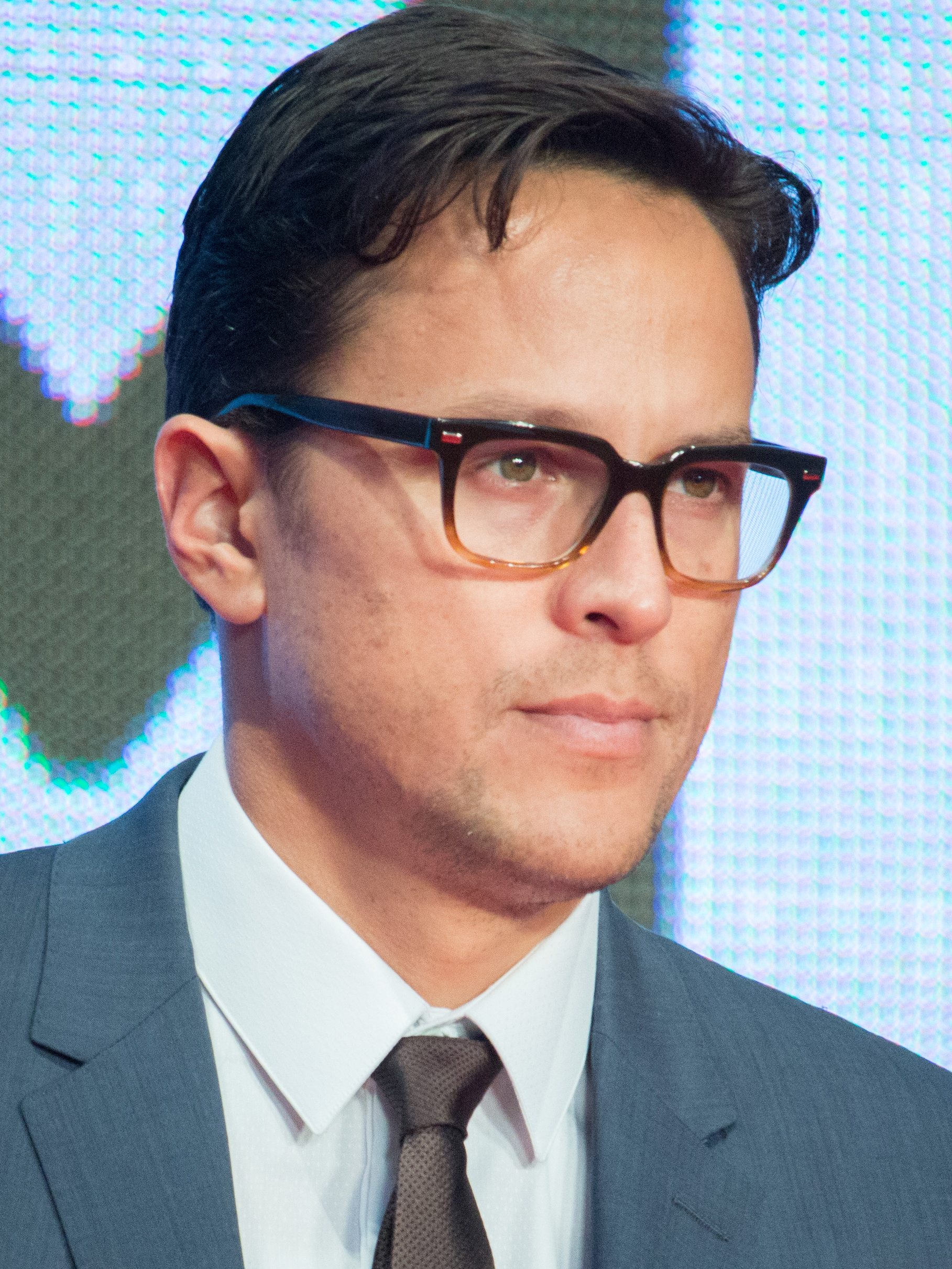
Cary Joji Fukunaga (pictured in 2015) directed the first season in its entirety, with Pizzolatto as the sole writer. Such an arrangement is extremely uncommon in American television production and prompted auteurist readings.

Another major topic of discussion concerns True Detective's artistic merits under the framework of auteur theory. Auteurism (from the French auteur, "author") is a critical framework in which films (or other works of art) are assessed as reflections of the personal vision of individual authors, typically the director or writer. Authorship of a television series is most commonly ascribed to the showrunner, usually a creator of a series who fills a dual role as head writer and executive producer. For example, the crime drama Twin Peaks (1990–91) is often interpreted as a product of the contrasting visions of its co-creators, David Lynch and Mark Frost, each of whom exercised varying degrees of control over the course of its first two seasons and later sequels. Colin Robertson at The List saw Twin Peaks as the most notable artistic antecedent to True Detective's first season, seeing that both shows challenge generic crime drama cliches and "use the genre conventions of a whodunnit-style mystery as a sublimely subversive diving board, and leap off from there to tell a broader story."

From the perspective of auteur theory, the first season of True Detective is noteworthy for its reliance on only a single screenwriter and a single director: not only did Pizzolatto serve as showrunner, but he and Fukunaga were at the helm of each episode as sole writer and director, respectively. The partnership of a sole writer and sole director was virtually unique in the traditionally collaborative medium of television production, as most series involve a writing staff and a set of several directors working in tandem over the course of a season. Scott Timberg at Salon noted that Pizzolatto's previous writing experience was not in film or television but literary fiction, a "more purely auteurist form" for which total creative control by an individual author is the norm.

Fukunaga did not return for the second season, which instead featured six directors across eight episodes, and Pizzolatto retained control of the writing. Met with mixed reviews, season two prompted critics to reevaluate the "auteurist" perspective on the previous season. A critical consensus held that, in hindsight, the response to season one had overestimated the extent of Pizzolatto's individual creative responsibility. Ryan Lattanzio at IndieWire posited that Fukunaga's direction of the first season in its entirety had resulted in a consistent vision that counterbalanced "Pizzolatto's tendency to overwrite, and undercook". Conversely, Brian Tallerico of RogerEbert.com recognized the common view that Fukunaga had provided "balance" to "Pizzolatto's overwriting" but argued "the balance came equally" from Harrelson and McConaughey playing against type in serious roles, as both actors were "widely-known as 'laid-back dudes,' often in comedies as much as drama".

=== Religion ===
True Detective explores Christianity and the dichotomy between religion and rationality. Born into a devout Catholic household, Pizzolatto said that as a child he saw religion as storytelling that acts "as an escape from the truth". According to Andrew Romano at The Daily Beast, the season alludes to Pizzolatto's childhood and creates a parallel between Christianity and the supernatural theology of "Carcosa": "Both ... are stories. Stories people tell themselves to escape reality. Stories that 'violate every law of the universe.'" Romano believed this message is not critical of religion per se; rather it shows how the "power of storytelling" and religious zeal "can wind [you] up in some pretty sick places." Jeff Jensen from Entertainment Weekly has opined that the show becomes more self-aware through Cohle's harsh critiques of religion, which he viewed as a vehicle for commentary about pop culture escapism. Stapleton observed that the crimes on True Detective—through its victims and the implications of sacrifice and sexual violence—"respond to the conservative Christianity from which they originate, and seek to exploit the opportunities for the pleasure of transgression such a structure offers."

Theorist Edia Connole saw connections to Philip Marlowe and Le Morte d'Arthur's Lancelot in True Detective's presentation of Cohle, all "knights whose duty to their liege lord is tempered with devotion to God." Other aspects of True Detective evoke Christian imagery, including the opening scene, which Connole felt mirrored the crucifixion of Jesus. The author and philosopher Finn Janning argued that Cohle's evolution illustrates an affinity between Buddhism and philosophical pessimism. A self-proclaimed pessimist, Cohle is, however, changed by a near-death experience in the season finale, in which he has an epiphany, seeing death as "pure love": this echoes the Buddhist concept of rigpa.

=== Masculinity and depiction of women ===
Commentators have noted masculinity as a theme in True Detective. Christopher Lirette of Southern Spaces said the show was about "men living in a brutally masculine world" and women are depicted as "things-to-be-saved and erotic obstacles" à la Double Indemnity (1944) and Chinatown (1974). Slate's Willa Paskin said True Detective's depiction of its female characters—as sex workers, the deceased and "a nagging wife"—seemed to reveal an intent to reflect the protagonists' "blinkered worldview and the very masculine, Southern cop culture they inhabited". Some commentators saw Hart's characterization as a manifestation of this idea, evident through his conventional view of women as virgins and whores, as well as his treatment of Maggie and Audrey. When Hart confronts the two men who had sex with Audrey, he is in essence "charging other men a price for infringing on the daughter he sees, in a muddled way, as both deserving of protection and badly in need of being controlled".

In her piece for Salon, Janet Turley said that the women "become reflections of the men", given that the True Detective universe is seen through the eyes of the show's male leads. Sam Adams of Indiewire contended that the story was about "the horrible things men do to women", many of which are never reported to or investigated by authorities. Adams wrote, "No one missed Dora Lange. Marie Fontenot disappeared, and the police let a rumor stop them from following up". He said the role of women was more profound because Cohle suffers through his ex-wife and deceased daughter and Hart is unable to "deal appropriately with the women who are there". According to Scott Wilson, a cultural studies lecturer at Kingston University, women are categorized as "the superegoic, the obscene and the sacred". Maggie, in Wilson's interpretation, is portrayed as the superegoic wife who "constantly makes demands on her guilty husband or partner tying him or her down and deflecting him or her from his symbolic role as police".

The philosopher Erin K. Stapleton subscribes to the theory that Dora Lange's corpse serves to "provide the initial territory or orientation through which the communities of True Detective are formed." It is through Dora's corpse that Cohle and Hart's partnership is first clearly articulated and in addition to their own bond, "the intimate knowledge" of her body is the basis of all of the other relationships in their respective lives. Her narrative thus, by proxy, influences both men's character development as they delve into the case.

== Reception ==
=== Viewership ===
True Detective debuted to 2.3 million U.S. viewers, becoming HBO's highest rated series premiere since the pilot episode of Boardwalk Empire. Ratings remained steady and peaked at the finale, which drew 3.5 million viewers. Overall, season one averaged 2.33 million viewers, and its average gross audience (which includes DVR recordings, reruns, and HBO Go streaming) totaled 11.9 million viewers per episode, thus becoming HBO's highest rated freshman show since the first season of Six Feet Under 13 years earlier.

=== Critical response ===
True Detective, coming as it does after what was arguably the best year for dramas in at least five years ... just puts an exclamation point on the topic of excessive quality.

— Tim Goodman, The Hollywood Reporter.

The American press considered True Detective to be among the best television shows of 2014. On Rotten Tomatoes, the first season has an approval rating of 92% based on 100 reviews, with a critics consensus stating: "In True Detective, performances by Woody Harrelson and Matthew McConaughey reel the viewer in, while the style, vision and direction make it hard to turn away." Many critics complimented the work of both lead actors, often singling out McConaughey for further praise, with his work described as "jaw-droppingly great" and "simply magnetic". Some reviewers singled out simple conversational scenes, often in claustrophobic interiors, as some of the best acting in the series. The characterization received mixed reviews: Cohle's speeches, described by HuffPost as "mesmerizing monologues", and by Vanity Fair as dense and interesting material, were criticized by the New York Post as "'70s-era psycho-babble" which slowed down the story. Several critics viewed the portrayals of women as stereotypical: "either angry or aroused", though Michelle Monaghan was praised for her performance in a "thankless role".

Pizzolatto and Fukunaga, as sole writer and director of the entire series, were able to exercise much stronger control over the show than is usual for a TV series, which let the show take risks: the pacing, dialogue, and cinematography all departed at times from the expectations for a television drama. Pizzolatto's scripts drew occasional criticism as "self-consciously literary" and overwritten, and several journalists attributed mistakes in the script to Pizzolatto's inexperience in writing TV drama. Despite the criticism, the Daily Telegraph and Uproxx described the season as "ambitious" and "dense with event and meaning". The flashback structure also divided critics: it was described as "impressively seamless", and "a major asset", but the fragmented approach to storytelling was considered a flaw by others. Uproxx praised Fukunaga's atmospheric and "hauntingly beautiful" cinematography, and The Boston Globe complimented the "spare, hollow, percussive" soundtrack, with Uproxx crediting the creative control the two men wielded for the quality of the result.

The story of two mismatched detectives working on a case was described by several critics as a cliché, though many reviewers felt this was made into a strength: The Daily Beast, for example, described the narrative as having "the potential to be revolutionary", and the Grantland reviewer felt that "the form is truly radical and forward-thinking", though he added that "the content is anything but". Emily Nussbaum, writing for The New Yorker, was also critical, considering the real story to be "a simpler tale: one about heroic male outlines and closeups of female asses"; she described the philosophical monologues as "dorm-room deep talk" and argued that the show had "fallen for its own sales pitch". Other reviewers were more positive: comments ranged from "as frighteningly nervy and furious in its delivery and intent as prime David Lynch", to "one of the most riveting and provocative series I've ever seen".

=== Accolades ===
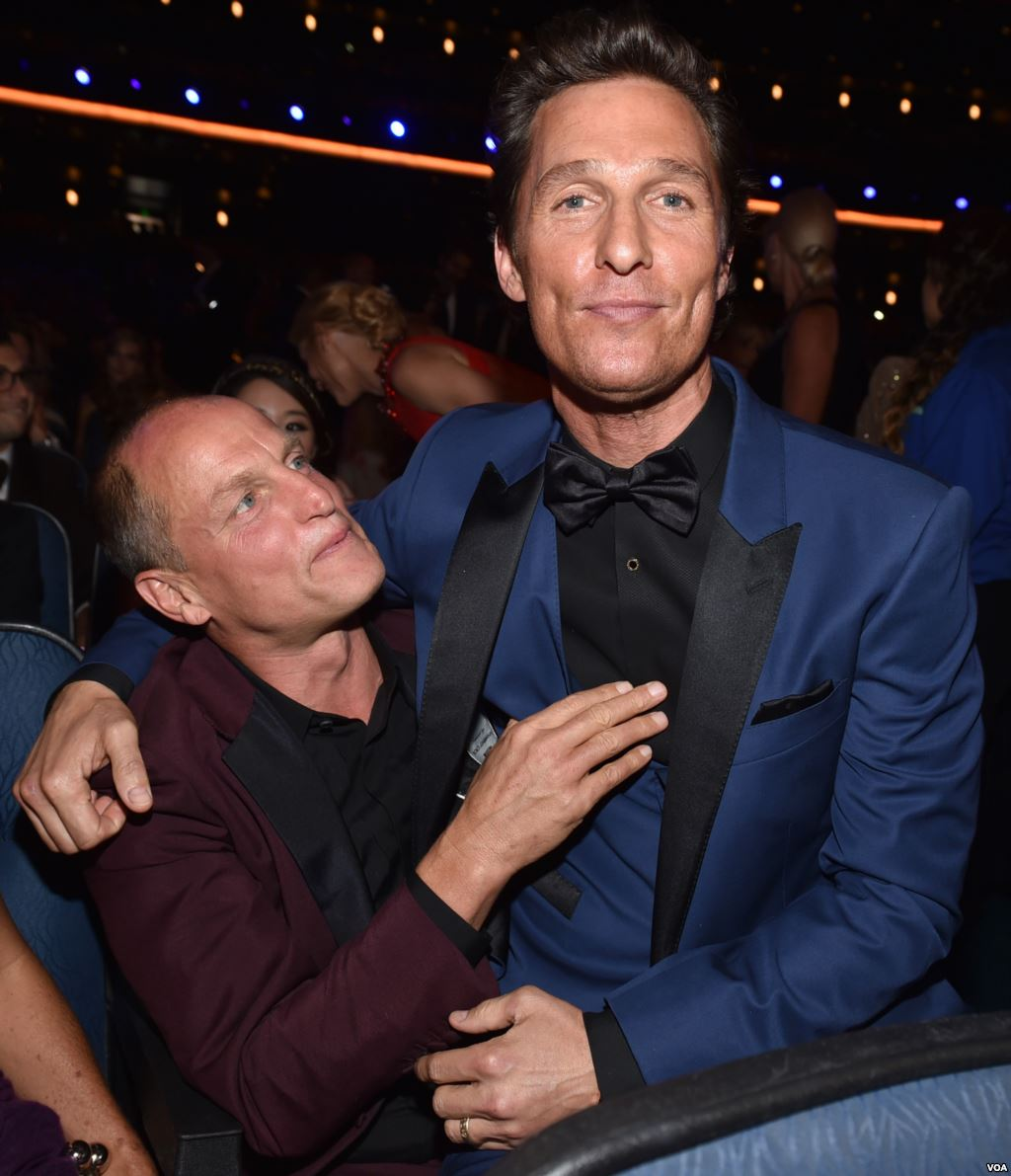
Harrelson (left) and McConaughey (right) at the 66th Primetime Emmy Awards

As the nominations for the 66th Primetime Emmy Awards approached, early media reports named True Detective among several potential miniseries candidates, due to a revision made by the Academy of Television Arts & Sciences that recognized film and miniseries content as distinct categories. By March 2014, HBO had submitted True Detective as a drama series contender, an unconventional move given the show's anthology format and fierce competition from the likes of Breaking Bad and House of Cards. HBO's decision was censured by FX president John Landgraf, who remarked to reporters at a press event: "My own personal point of view is that a miniseries is a story that ends, a series is a story that continues. To tell you the truth, I think it's actually unfair for HBO to put True Detective in the drama series category because essentially you can get certain actors to do a closed-ended series – a la Billy Bob Thornton in Fargo or Matthew McConaughey and Woody Harrelson in True Detective – who you can't get to sign on for a seven-year [regular drama series] deal." Nevertheless, True Detective emerged as a frontrunner heading into the Primetime Emmy season, and in July 2014, was nominated for twelve awards; its closest rival, Breaking Bad, received sixteen nominations. The series ultimately won five Emmy awards: Outstanding Directing (Fukunaga), Outstanding Casting, Outstanding Main Title Design, Outstanding Make-Up, and Outstanding Cinematography.

True Detective was a candidate for a variety of awards, most of which recognized outstanding achievement in direction, cinematography, writing, and acting. It received four Golden Globe nominations, among them for Best Miniseries or Television Film, and a TCA Award for Program of the Year. Among the show's wins include a British Academy Television Award (BAFTA) for Best International Programme, a Writers Guild of America Award in the Dramatic Series category, and a Critics' Choice Television Award for Best Actor in a Drama Series (McConaughey).

Award	Date of ceremony	Category	Nominee(s)	Result	Ref.
Critics' Choice Television Awards	June 19, 2014	Best Drama Series	True Detective	Nominated	
Critics' Choice Television Awards	June 19, 2014	Best Actor in a Drama Series	Matthew McConaughey	Won	
TCA Awards	July 19, 2014	Outstanding New Program	True Detective	Nominated	
TCA Awards	July 19, 2014	Program of the Year	True Detective	Nominated	
TCA Awards	July 19, 2014	Outstanding Achievement in Movies, Miniseries, and Specials	True Detective	Won	
TCA Awards	July 19, 2014	Individual Achievement in Drama	Matthew McConaughey	Won	
Primetime Creative Arts Emmy Awards	August 16, 2014	Outstanding Music Composition for a Series	T Bone Burnett	Nominated	
Primetime Creative Arts Emmy Awards	August 16, 2014	Outstanding Casting for a Drama Series	Alexa L. Fogel, Christine Kromer and Meagan Lewis	Won	
Primetime Creative Arts Emmy Awards	August 16, 2014	Outstanding Make-up for a Single-Camera Series (Non-Prosthetic)	Felicity Bowring, Wendy Bell, Ann Pala, Kim Perrodin, Linda Dowds	Won	
Primetime Creative Arts Emmy Awards	August 16, 2014	Outstanding Cinematography for a Single-Camera Series	Adam Arkapaw	Won	
Primetime Creative Arts Emmy Awards	August 16, 2014	Outstanding Main Title Design	Patrick Clair, Raoul Marks, Jennifer Sofio Hall	Won	
Primetime Creative Arts Emmy Awards	August 16, 2014	Outstanding Art Direction for a Contemporary or Fantasy Series	Alex DiGerlando, Mara LePere-Schloop, Tim Beach, Cynthia Slagter	Nominated	
Primetime Creative Arts Emmy Awards	August 16, 2014	Outstanding Single-Camera Picture Editing for a Drama Series	Affonso Gonçalves	Nominated	
Primetime Emmy Awards	August 25, 2014	Outstanding Drama Series	True Detective	Nominated	
Primetime Emmy Awards	August 25, 2014	Outstanding Lead Actor in a Drama Series	Matthew McConaughey	Nominated	
Primetime Emmy Awards	August 25, 2014	Outstanding Lead Actor in a Drama Series	Woody Harrelson	Nominated	
Primetime Emmy Awards	August 25, 2014	Outstanding Directing for a Drama Series	Cary Joji Fukunaga	Won	
Primetime Emmy Awards	August 25, 2014	Outstanding Writing for a Drama Series	Nic Pizzolatto	Nominated	
Golden Globe Awards	January 11, 2015	Best Miniseries or Television Film	True Detective	Nominated	
Golden Globe Awards	January 11, 2015	Best Actor – Miniseries or Television Film	Matthew McConaughey	Nominated	
Golden Globe Awards	January 11, 2015	Best Actor – Miniseries or Television Film	Woody Harrelson	Nominated	
Golden Globe Awards	January 11, 2015	Best Supporting Actress – Series, Miniseries or Television Film	Michelle Monaghan	Nominated	
Screen Actors Guild Awards	January 25, 2015	Outstanding Performance by a Male Actor in a Drama Series	Matthew McConaughey	Nominated	
Screen Actors Guild Awards	January 25, 2015	Outstanding Performance by a Male Actor in a Drama Series	Woody Harrelson	Nominated	
Directors Guild of America Awards	February 7, 2015	Outstanding Directing – Drama Series	Cary Joji Fukunaga	Nominated	
Writers Guild of America Awards	February 14, 2015	Dramatic Series	Nic Pizzolatto	Won	
Writers Guild of America Awards	February 14, 2015	New Series	Nic Pizzolatto	Won	
Satellite Awards	February 15, 2015	Best Drama Series	True Detective	Nominated	
Satellite Awards	February 15, 2015	Best Actor in a Drama Series	Woody Harrelson	Nominated	
Satellite Awards	February 15, 2015	Best Supporting Actress in a Series, Miniseries, or Television Film	Michelle Monaghan	Nominated	
Location Managers Guild Awards	March 7, 2015	Outstanding Locations in a Contemporary Television Series	Batou Chandler	Won	
British Academy Television Awards	March 10, 2015	Best International Programme	True Detective	Won	

== Home media ==
On June 10, 2014, HBO Home Entertainment released the first season of True Detective on DVD and Blu-ray Disc formats. In addition to the eight episodes, both formats contain bonus content including interviews with McConaughey and Harrelson, Pizzolatto, and composer Burnett on the show's development, "Inside the Episode" featurettes, two audio commentaries, and deleted scenes from the season. During its first week of sale in the United States, True Detective was the number two-selling TV series on DVD and Blu-ray Disc, selling 65,208 copies.

== See also ==
- Satanic panic
