= Glenn Fleshler =

American actor

- Education: New York University (MFA)
- Occupation: Actor
- Years active: 1993–present
- Spouse: Jocelyn Greene
- Children: 1

Glenn Fleshler is an American actor. On television, he is noted for his recurring roles as bootlegger George Remus in Boardwalk Empire (2011–2014), Errol Childress in True Detective (2014), and Orrin Bach in Billions (2016–2023). He also starred as Chechen mob boss, Goran Pazar in the HBO black comedy series Barry (2018–2022). He had a supporting role in the 2019 film Joker.

== Early life and education ==
Fleshler was born to a Jewish family and studied acting at New York University's Tisch School of the Performing Arts, from which he has an MFA.

== Career ==
=== Film ===
Fleshler's first major film was 1998's A Price Above Rubies. More recently, he has appeared in such films as Blue Jasmine (2013), A Most Violent Year (2014), God's Pocket (2014), The Rendezvous (2016) and Joker (2019).

=== Television ===
Fleshler's television credits include Billions, Barry, Sex and the City, Law & Order, Law & Order: Special Victims Unit, Fringe, Third Watch, Bored to Death, The Good Wife, FBI: Most Wanted, The Following. He portrayed George Remus in seasons 2–4 of Boardwalk Empire, and Errol Childress in Season 1 of True Detective. He played Dr. Cordell Doemling, Mason Verger's physician and henchman, in season 3 of Hannibal. He played Judge Roth in the miniseries The Night Of. He was also cast as Officer Christopher Lasky in episode 3 of the 2019 revival of The Twilight Zone.

=== Theater ===
Fleshler's Broadway credits include Death of a Salesman, Guys and Dolls, Arcadia, Good Night, and Good Luck and The Merchant of Venice. Off-Broadway, he has appeared in such plays as Measure for Measure and Pericles, Prince of Tyre.

== Filmography ==
=== Film ===
Year	Title	Role	Notes
1998	A Price Above Rubies	Chief Gabbai	
2000	Astronomy of Errors	Ernie Gishi	
2002	Garmento	Tony	
2006	The Shovel	Deputy Hudson	Short film
2010	Henry's Crime	Audience Friend	Uncredited
2010	All Good Things	Sidney Greenhaus	
2011	Margaret	1st Man	
2013	The Immigrant	Political Hack	
2013	Blue Jasmine	Hal & Jasmine's Friend	
2013	Gods Behaving Badly	Landauer	
2013	Delivery Man	Coffee Shop Owner	
2013	God's Pocket	Coleman Peets	
2014	The Cobbler	Jeffrey	
2014	A Most Violent Year	Arnold Kline	
2015	Rock the Kasbah	Army Warrant Officer	
2016	The Rendezvous	Conrad Hanley	
2017	Suburbicon	Ira Sloan	
2018	Irreplaceable You	Mean Phil	
2018	The Seagull	Shamrayev	
2019	High Flying Bird	Intimidating Seton Colleague	
2019	Joker	Randall Kleinmanhoffer	
2021	Werewolves Within	Emerson Flint	
2021	Clean	Michael	
2024	Young Woman and the Sea	James Sullivan	
2024	Lake George	Armen	
TBA	On the End		Post-production

=== Television ===
Year	Title	Role	Notes
1993	Homicide: Life on the Street	Killer with Black Hair and Blonde Eyebrows	Episode: "Gone for Goode"
1998	Sex and the City	Shmuel	Episode: "Secret Sex"
2002	The Job	Kent	Episode: "Betrayal"
2002–2008	Law & Order	Various	3 episodes
2002–2026	Law & Order: Special Victims Unit	Various	8 episodes
2003	Third Watch	Gary Barnes	2 episodes
2008	Fringe	Ron	Episode: "Power Hungry"
2009	Bored to Death	Bartender	Episode: "Stockholm Syndrome"
2010	Damages	Detective Milton Trammell	6 episodes
2010	The Good Wife	Carl Landers	Episode: "Breaking Fast"
2010–2012	Delocated	Pavel Mirminsky	7 episodes
2011–2013	Boardwalk Empire	George Remus	9 episodes
2014	True Detective	Errol Childress	3 episodes
2014	Resurrection	Mikey Enders	3 episodes
2015	The Following	Neil	2 episodes
2015	Elementary	Trey McCann	Episode: "The Best Way Out Is Always Through"
2015	Hannibal	Dr. Cordell Doemling	3 episodes
2016	BrainDead	Aaron Blades	2 episodes
2016	The Night Of	Judge Roth	3 episodes
2016–2023	Billions	Orrin Bach	38 episodes
2018	Waco	Tony Prince	4 episodes
2018	Maniac	Sebastian	Episode: "Furs by Sebastian"
2018–2022	Barry	Goran Pazar	9 episodes
2019	The Twilight Zone	Officer Lasky	Episode: "Replay"
2019	Watchmen	Fred	Episode: "This Extraordinary Being"
2020–2021	For Life	Capt. Frank Foster	Main; 13 episodes
2022	The Thing About Pam	Russ Faria	Main; 6 episodes
2022	FBI: Most Wanted	Caleb Walsh	Episode: "Overlooked"
2024	Fallout	Sorrel Booker	Episode: "The Trap"
2026	CIA	Mateo Kola	Episode: "Orbital"

=== Video games ===
Year	Title	Role
2003	Manhunt	Smilie
2009	Grand Theft Auto: The Ballad of Gay Tony	Timur
