= Adam Arkapaw =

Australian cinematographer

- Born: Bowral, New South Wales, Australia
- Occupation: Cinematographer
- Years active: 2001–present
- Spouse: Autumn Durald (m. 2015)
- Children: 1
- Website: www.arkapaw.com

Adam Arkapaw is an Australian cinematographer. He received recognition for his work on the first series of Top of the Lake (2013) and True Detective (2014), for which he received two Primetime Creative Arts Emmy Awards.

== Early life and education ==
Arkapaw was born in Bowral, a New South Wales town south of Sydney, and attended Bowral High School. He studied at the University of Melbourne's Victorian College of the Arts, graduating in 2006 with a Bachelor of Film and Television.

== Career ==
In addition to numerous short films, Arkapaw photographed three Australian features over the next several years: Animal Kingdom (2010), Snowtown (2011), and Lore (2012). He received a nomination for the AACTA Award for Best Cinematography in 2010 for his work on Animal Kingdom and in 2011 he was named one of Variety magazine's "10 Cinematographers to Watch".

Arkapaw next worked on Jane Campion's television miniseries Top of the Lake, which was filmed in New Zealand and broadcast in 2013. That year he won a Creative Arts Emmy Award for Outstanding Cinematography for a Miniseries or Movie. In 2014 he won his second Emmy Award, for Outstanding Cinematography for a Single-Camera Series, in recognition of his work on the HBO television series True Detective. True Detective was filmed in Louisiana and Arkapaw's cinematography received wide praise, especially for a six-minute single-take long take that was planned over months and took one and a half days to film.

Arkapaw was the cinematographer of the 2015 film Macbeth, directed by Justin Kurzel, with whom Arkapaw previously worked on Snowtown. He also photographed McFarland, USA, an American sports film released in 2015, and the drama film The Light Between Oceans. He collaborated with Kurzel for a third time on the action-adventure film Assassin's Creed, which was released in the United States in December 2016.

== Personal life ==
Arkapaw is married to American cinematographer Autumn Durald Arkapaw. They have one child.

Arkapaw played cricket for the Royal Park Reds in the summer 2005–06 season. He was deemed Best on Ground in their grand final match against Pascoe Vale United after scoring 65 (not out) and 52 in each innings and taking a total of seven wickets.

== Filmography ==
=== Film ===
Year	Title	Director	Notes
2009	Blind Company	Alkinos Tsilimidos	
2010	Animal Kingdom	David Michôd	
2011	Snowtown	Justin Kurzel	
2012	Lore	Cate Shortland	
2015	McFarland, USA	Niki Caro	
2015	Macbeth	Justin Kurzel	
2016	The Light Between Oceans	Derek Cianfrance	
2016	Assassin's Creed	Justin Kurzel	
2019	Light of My Life	Casey Affleck	
2019	The King	David Michôd	
2024	The Order	Justin Kurzel	
2025	Magazine Dreams	Elijah Bynum	
2026	Company	Casey Affleck	
2027	Kockroach †	Matt Ross	Post-production

=== Television ===
Year	Title	Director	Notes
2013	Top of the Lake	Jane Campion; Garth Davis	7 episodes
2014	True Detective	Cary Joji Fukunaga	Season 1
2015	Flesh and Bone	David Michôd	Episode "Bulling Through"
2024	Masters of the Air	Cary Joji Fukunaga	4 episodes

== Awards and nominations ==
Award	Year	Category	Title	Result	Refs.
AACTA Awards	2012	Best Cinematography	Snowtown	Nominated	
AACTA Awards	2013	Best Cinematography	Lore	Nominated	
AACTA Awards	2014	Best Cinematography in Television	Top of the Lake	Won	
AACTA Awards	2015	Byron Kennedy Award		Won	
AACTA Awards	2019	Best Cinematography	The King	Won	
ASC Awards	2015	Spotlight Award	Macbeth	Won	
Australian Film Institute Awards	2006	Outstanding Achievement in Short Film Screen Craft	End of Town	Nominated	
Australian Film Institute Awards	2010	Best Cinematography	Animal Kingdom	Nominated	
British Independent Film Awards	2015	Best Technical Achievement	Macbeth	Nominated	
Manaki Film Festival	2015	Silver Camera 300	Macbeth	Won	
Creative Arts Emmy Awards	2013	Outstanding Cinematography for a Limited or Anthology Series	Top of the Lake	Won	
Creative Arts Emmy Awards	2014	Outstanding Cinematography for a Single-Camera Series	True Detective	Won	
Stockholm International Film Festival	2012	Best Cinematography	Lore	Won	
