= Now Am Found =

- True Detective episode
- Episode no.: Season 3 Episode 8
- Directed by: Daniel Sackheim
- Written by: Nic Pizzolatto
- Cinematography by: Germain McMicking
- Editing by: Leo Trombetta
- Original air date: February 24, 2019
- Running time: 75 minutes

Guest appearances
- Michael Rooker as Edward Hoyt; Brett Cullen as George Kindt; Gareth Williams as Police Chief Warren; Steven Williams as Junius Watts; Scott Shepherd as Harris James; Mamie Gummer as Lucy Purnell; Bea Santos as 21 Year Old Julie Purcell; Lauren Sweetser as Isabel Hoyt; Phoenix Elkin as Will Purcell; Lena McCarthy as Julie Purcell; Deborah Ayorinde as Becca Hays; Roxanne Hart as Mrs. James; Lindsay Musil as Shelly; Sola Bamis as Heather Hays; Nathan Wetherington as Mike Ardoin; Virginia Kirby as Courthouse Manager; Tim Sitarz as Big Biker; CC Castillo as Big Biker's Woman; Ivy Dubreuil as Lucy Ardoin; Bailey Rae Fenderson as Amy Hays

Episode chronology
← Previous "The Final Country"	Next → "Part 1"
- True Detective (season 3)

"Now Am Found" is the eighth episode and season finale of the third season of the American anthology crime drama television series True Detective. It is the 24th overall episode of the series and was written by series creator Nic Pizzolatto, and directed by executive producer Daniel Sackheim. It was first broadcast on HBO in the United States on February 24, 2019.

The season takes place in the Ozarks over three separate time periods. In 1980, partner detectives Wayne Hays (Mahershala Ali) and Roland West (Stephen Dorff) investigated a macabre crime involving two missing children, Will and Julie Purcell. In 1990, Hays was questioned after the case is re-opened after new evidence resurfaces. In 2015, an old Hays with memory problems conducts an interview to discuss the case. In the episode, Hays and West make a last attempt in finding closure to the case, including interrogating a figure of their past.

According to Nielsen Media Research, the episode was seen by an estimated 1.38 million household viewers and gained a 0.4 ratings share among adults aged 18–49. The episode received extremely positive reviews from critics, who praised the performances, character development, and directing. However, reception was polarized around the closure of the mystery; some deemed it fitting with the theme of the season, while others found it unfulfilling and anticlimactic.

== Plot ==
=== 1980 ===
Amelia (Carmen Ejogo) has written an article in the newspaper, criticizing the investigation in the Purcell case and suggesting that her "sources" may indicate that the case can't be closed due to ignored evidence. Police Chief Warren (Gareth Williams) and Kindt (Brett Cullen) are furious for the statement and confront Hays (Mahershala Ali) and West (Stephen Dorff). They want Hays to retract from the statement and discredit her, per West's suggestion. When Hays refuses, he is given the option to be demoted to an administrative position or quit the police force. He chooses the former.

Hays meets with Amelia, and both express frustration with their paths in life. That night, Hays and Amelia have a fight where he accuses her of using him for her own purposes in the books. At a bar, Hays is visited by Amelia, while he considers breaking up with her. As Amelia questions him on what he wants to do, Hays confides that he wants to marry her. They decide that, despite their problems, they want to be with each other and accept the proposal.

=== 1990 ===
In the car, Hays meets Hoyt (Michael Rooker), who is aware of Hays' investigation. They take him to the woods to talk. Hays claims to know about James' activities, but Hoyt points out that James' pager had a GPS tracking unit, so he knows his last possible location. He warns Hays to stop investigating, saying he also owns footage of Hays' car following James' car.

Amelia and Hays argue and he resigns from the police force. He becomes head of campus security at a university, and Amelia becomes a lecturer at the same university.

=== 2015 ===
Hays and West question James' widow, who works at a nursing home, about the black man with the milky eye. She says she was approached by the man, who wanted to know if James found Julie, identifying him as "Junius". (Note: The man who questioned Amelia in "Hunters in the Dark".) They then decide to visit Hoyt's abandoned mansion. In the mansion, they discover the pink room in the basement, which contains a painting on the wall with three figures: "Princess Mary", "Sir Junius", and "Queen Isabel".

After discovering Junius Watts' address, they visit his house. Watts (Steven Williams) anticipated them, revealing himself as the man who was parked outside Hays' house. He then explains the "truth" to them: a grief-stricken Isabel Hoyt (Lauren Sweetser) saw Julie at a Hoyt Foods company picnic, and, perceiving Julie to have a strong resemblance to her late daughter, wanted to see her again. Watts paid Lucy (Mamie Gummer) to allow Julie to play with Isabel regularly in the woods, under the supervision of Watts and Will. However, Isabel stopped taking her lithium medication and tried to take Julie. Will tried to stop her and Isabel pushed him causing him to hit his head on a rock. James (Scott Shepherd) paid Lucy to allow Isabel to keep Julie. Isabel gave Julie lithium to keep her happy. As Julie grew up, she started asking questions and Watts helped her escape, but she went missing. After many years, he appeared to have found her at a convent for some years.

Watts explains that he was parked outside Hays' house, as he lacked the courage to speak the truth. He wants them to arrest him but their retired status prevents them from doing so. West also suggests that if he can't live with it, he should just kill himself. Visiting the convent, a woman tells them that Julie was there, after she caught HIV. She then shows them her gravestone, marked under the name "Mary July". While leaving the convent, they run into a groundskeeper (Nathan Wetherington) with a daughter named Lucy (Ivy Dubreuil).

Despite the confession, both Hays and West feel like the case isn't closed. They then make arrangements so that West can visit more often. The next day, Hays reads an excerpt from Amelia's book, where she talks in detail about Mike Ardoin, one of Julie's neighbors. Amelia's hallucination prompts Hays to finally realize something: Mike was the groundskeeper at the convent, which suggests that his daughter may be Julie's daughter, and the nuns may have faked Julie's death to protect her.

After obtaining Mike's address in Greenland, Arkansas, Hays visits him. However, before he steps out of his car, his memory loss hits again and forgets why he was there. As he talks to Henry (Ray Fisher) on the phone, he is told to ask the woman (Bea Santos) in the house for help. While Henry goes to pick him up, Hays is offered a glass of water by the family, as he drinks it, realisation of who he is with returns. Henry arrives to help him back, with Rebecca (Deborah Ayorinde) also showing up to drive him home.

While Hays goes to play with his family, Henry finds his note with the woman's address and decides to keep it. West joins the family outside the porch. As Hays stares at his grandchildren riding their bicycles, he remembers once again his marriage proposal to Amelia in 1980. The episode ends with a brief flashback of a young Hays venturing in the woods during the Vietnam War.

== Production ==
=== Development ===
In January 2019, the episode's title was revealed as "Now Am Found" and it was announced that series creator Nic Pizzolatto had written the episode while executive producer Daniel Sackheim directed it. This was Pizzolatto's twenty-fourth writing credit, and Sackheim's fourth directing credit.

== Reception ==
=== Viewers ===
The episode was watched by 1.38 million viewers, earning a 0.4 in the 18-49 rating demographics on the Nielson ratings scale. This means that 0.4 percent of all households with televisions watched the episode. This was a slight increase from the previous episode, which was watched by 1.32 million viewers with a 0.3 in the 18-49 demographics. It was also a 50% decrease from the previous season finale, which was watched by 2.73 million viewers with a 1.2 in the 18-49 demographics.

=== Critical reviews ===
"Now Am Found" received extremely positive reviews from critics. The review aggregator website Rotten Tomatoes reported an 87% approval rating for the episode, based on 15 reviews, with an average rating of 8.4/10. The site's consensus states: "While viewers may be split by how 'Now Am Found' concludes the central mystery of this True Detective incarnation, most will agree that the richly emotional finale brings closure to Wayne Hayes' story, ending on a bittersweet, gently optimistic note that is refreshing for a series known for its unblinking nihilism."

Emily L. Stephens of The A.V. Club gave the episode an "A−" grade and wrote, "'Now Am Found' delivers everything I expected from a True Detective finale: two hardbitten men having a talking like this contest, a perversely cheerful dungeon for a kidnapped child, and a last-minute revelation in the form of that conspicuous landscaper and his scampering daughter. 'Now Am Found' also delivers the last thing I expected from True Detective: a happy ending."

Alan Sepinwall of Rolling Stone wrote, "Pizzolatto is still iffy on plot, but with this season he reestablished the series as one of TV's most preeminent acting showcases." Lanre Bakare of The Guardian wrote, "The first good TV show of the year came to a head, but was the pay-off too silly and simplistic?" Ben Travers of IndieWire gave the episode a "B" grade and wrote, "Even though no one from Season 1 showed up, the ending to Season 3 still mimicked its ending by placing the emphasis on the detectives. Sure, it was a bit more balanced this time, but Pizzolatto didn't even try to follow-up on the un-investigated pedophile ring he teased last episode. Maybe that's what Season 4 will do, but for now, it's over. Another happy ending in the books. Another story where the light is winning. And that feels good."

Darren Franich of Entertainment Weekly gave the episode a "C" grade and wrote, "True Detective season 3 tried hard to challenge Wayne, but the show felt his desk job as a vivid punishment: Truly, a worse Hell than Long-Range Recon. The show couldn't escape its own broseph sensibility, a sanctified way of worshipping its tragically awesome heroes and the truth of their detection." Amy Glynn of Paste gave the episode an 8.5 out of 10 and wrote, "After the relentless dreariness of much of the season, it's not amiss, and it's tempered by the way the protagonist finds this out and then fails to realize he knows what he knows. Time is a flat circle. Except when it's a Möbius strip."

Emily St. James of Vox wrote, "There is a dark force animating the True Detective universe and our own, and all you might ever see is this narrow strip of light where you stand. But you can build a life there. And that can be enough." Stephen Kornhaber of The Atlantic wrote, "In any other crime show, leaving out some details about the protagonist's family might seem standard, but in this case, doing so short-circuited the supposed profundity of Wayne's personal journey. The finale did fill in a lot that had been left unclear about Wayne and Amelia's history. [...] Viewers just knew that Amelia died somehow and that things between him and Becca were tense. As Wayne was shown horsing around with his grandkids in the final few minutes of the finale, there was a sense that he'd reached some new level of engagement with life — but the details of what he overcame were left sketchy. So was the fate of his wife, a major character."

Keith Phipps of Vulture gave the episode a 4 star rating out of 5 and wrote, "And what's true of the back half of this finale is true to the season as a whole, which started strong, dipped precipitously, then came back with a string of episodes that made it all worthwhile, and made it easy to wish it won't be another four years before we get a fourth season." Tony Sokol of Den of Geek gave the episode a perfect 5 star rating out of 5 and wrote, "In the first season, the first glimpse we got of the serial killer was him cutting a crooked circle in a patch of grass. True Detective Season 3 ends with Mike Ardoin, a landscaper, finding the love of his life. No one foresees a happy ending, it is a most unexpectedly delicious twist."

Sonia Saraiya of Vanity Fair wrote, "Visually and narratively, it felt cobbled together. The characters never quite communicated their truths to us, though they did try. The end didn't quite mean anything, although it attempted to. The mystery was solved, but it didn't matter. In a shorter season, True Detective's efforts would have been an intriguing interplay — perhaps still not entirely profound, but interesting and loaded enough to provoke thought. As it is, the show is too damn long to be successful." Scott Tobias of The New York Times wrote, "No one has to say, 'The light's winning', as Rust Cohle does at the end of Season 1, but Pizzolatto generously implies it."
