= The Big Never =

- True Detective episode
- Episode no.: Season 3 Episode 3
- Directed by: Daniel Sackheim
- Written by: Nic Pizzolatto
- Cinematography by: Germain McMicking
- Editing by: Leo Trombetta
- Original air date: January 20, 2019
- Running time: 54 minutes

Guest appearances
- Michael Greyeyes as Brett Woodard; Mamie Gummer as Lucy Purcell; Sarah Gadon as Elisa Montgomery; Jon Tenney as Alan Jones; Josh Hopkins as Jim Dobkins; Rhys Wakefield as Freddy Burns; Michael Broderick as Agent John Bowen; Tim Griffin as Agent Burt Diller; Marcus Lyle Brown as Doctor; Kennedi Lynn Butler as Young Becca Hays; Isaiah C. Morgan as Young Henry Hays; Brandon Flynn as Ryan Peters; Richard Meehan as Frankie Boyle; Emily Nelson as Margaret; Mark Cabus as Hoyt Foods Manager; Bojesse Christopher as Detective Richard Kitting; Lee Osorio as Sallisaw Police Detective; Lennon Morgan as Ronnie Boyle; Nick Basta as James Boyle; Mischa Hutchings as Ronnie's Counselor; Becki Davis as Mary; Harlon Miller as Walmart Security Guard; Mike Hickman as Farmer; Brian Oerly as Eddie; Brian Lee Brown as Man #3; Anthony Molinari as Man in the Truck; Melanie Haynes as Manager

Episode chronology
← Previous "Kiss Tomorrow Goodbye"	Next → "The Hour and the Day"
- True Detective (season 3)

"The Big Never" is the third episode of the third season of the American anthology crime drama television series True Detective. It is the 19th overall episode of the series and was written by series creator Nic Pizzolatto, and directed by Daniel Sackheim. It was first broadcast on HBO in the United States on January 20, 2019.

The season takes place in the Ozarks over three separate time periods. In 1980, partner detectives Wayne Hays (Mahershala Ali) and Roland West (Stephen Dorff) as they investigate a macabre crime involving two missing children, Will and Julie Purcell. In 1990, Hays is questioned after the case is re-opened after new evidence resurfaces. In 2015, an old Hays with memory problems conducts an interview to discuss the case. In the episode, Hays and West continue the search for Julie, with evidence now pointing to a chicken processing plant. The rest of the timelines involve West deciding to look more on the re-opened case while Hays examines evidence that was never reported.

According to Nielsen Media Research, the episode was seen by an estimated 1.06 million household viewers and gained a 0.3 ratings share among adults aged 18–49. The episode received positive reviews from critics, who praised the performances (particularly Ali and Dorff), directing and character development, although some expressed criticism for the pace and perceived lack of progress in the story.

== Plot ==
=== 1980 ===
The letter that was delivered to the Purcells is revealed to have been sent from Farmington, where an organization offers money for help in solving the case. Hays (Mahershala Ali) and West (Stephen Dorff) then question why Will and Julie often lied about their location, as they never visited Ronnie at his house.

Inspecting the kids' bedrooms, they discover notes and Hoyt Foods bags, a chicken processing plant. They then help in a search throughout the woods, where Hays talks once again with Amelia (Carmen Ejogo). There, Hays finds Will's backpack and bloody marks in the rocks. Using this, they interrogate a farmer (Mike Hickman), who claims he has already spoken to the police. He reports seeing Will and Julie constantly in the woods. He also mentions to having seen a brown car with a black man and a white woman. He refuses to cooperate further into the investigation unless they get a warrant.

Brett Woodard (Michael Greyeyes) is intercepted by some civilians, who accuse him of being involved in the disappearance and is brutally attacked, warned to leave town. This prompts him to remove a duffel bag from his shed. Hays and West visit Tom (Scoot McNairy) and Lucy (Mamie Gummer) at their house to show pictures of the many toys they discovered at the woods. Hays then leafs over a family album and is startled to find a photograph of Will taken at his First Communion, with his fingers interlaced and his eyes closed, in a similar position to the way he found him at the cave.

=== 1990 ===
West is questioned by Dobkins (Josh Hopkins) and Jones (Jon Tenney) about the Purcell case. He later talks with Tom about the case, who seems delighted at the news of his daughter being alive. Their conversation reveals that West lost contact with Hays, helped Tom with his alcoholism and that Lucy died.

Hays discloses some information regarding the case to Amelia. She decides to get more information by herself, claiming that she is using it as research for her book. Later, Hays goes shopping with Henry (Isaiah C. Morgan) and Becca (Kennedi Lynn Butler) at Walmart. At some point, he gets distracted and loses sight of Rebecca. He desperately urges employees to close the store until Becca appears again. Back home, he has an argument with Amelia over the case. Hays then goes to a bar where he meets with West, who wants him to help with the case as West is leading it. Although hesitant, Hays agrees to join him.

=== 2015 ===
After using a CT scan, Hays' doctor does not find anything wrong with his new condition. Hays is certain that he drove outside for a reason even if he can't remember and rejects the doctor's diagnosis, and even warns Henry (Ray Fisher) to not even consider putting him in a nursing home or he will commit suicide.

During an interview with Elisa (Sarah Gadon), Elisa questions how the police ignored the brown car despite witnesses reporting that it could be relevant to the case. He feels alarmed at the statement and ends the interview early. At his house, he tries to recall the brown car and is told by a hallucination of Amelia to focus on the case.

== Production ==
=== Development ===
In January 2019, the episode's title was revealed as "The Big Never" and it was announced that series creator Nic Pizzolatto had written the episode while Daniel Sackheim had directed it. This was Pizzolatto's nineteenth writing credit, and Sackheim's first directing credit. The episode was originally intended to be directed by Jeremy Saulnier but he exited the series before filming on the episode begun, as it had become clear that filming would take longer than expected to complete. He was replaced by Sackheim.

== Reception ==
=== Viewers ===
The episode was watched by 1.06 million viewers, earning a 0.3 in the 18-49 rating demographics on the Nielson ratings scale. This means that 0.3 percent of all households with televisions watched the episode. This was a 11% decrease from the previous episode, which was watched by 1.19 million viewers with a 0.3 in the 18-49 demographics.

=== Critical reviews ===
"The Big Never" received positive reviews from critics. The review aggregator website Rotten Tomatoes reported a 94% approval rating for the episode, based on 14 reviews, with an average rating of 6.75/10. The site's consensus states: "The walls of memory and time are closing in on Wayne Hayes in 'The Big Never', a straightforward installment that effectively conveys the terror of aging -- although some viewers may be less riveted by new developments in the season's core mystery."

Emily L. Stephens of The A.V. Club gave the episode a "B−" grade and wrote, "True Detective's third season is characterized by omissions. Maybe by season's end, the show will have earned the trust that intentional blanks demand. But it hasn't yet."

Sean T. Collins of Rolling Stone wrote, "Three episodes deep into its third season, the HBO anthology show may be back on the familiar sad Southern buddy-cop beat, but aside from the setting and the set-up it has shockingly little in common with either of its predecessors. This hour is so straightforward that it's damn close to a tony network procedural." Lanre Bakare of The Guardian wrote, "Hays struggles with lost memories and strange visions as the Purcell investigation uncovers some new clues." Ben Travers of IndieWire gave the episode a "B−" grade and wrote, "What this boils down to is the viewer leaves the episode liking Roland (and Wayne) a little better, while there's no real change for Amelia. For those just tracking the case, that may be OK. They can go study the timeline and theorize all the same. But those looking for a compelling human narrative may feel a little cheated."

Derek Lawrence of Entertainment Weekly wrote, "True Detective season 3 has been billed as a one-man showcase for Mahershala Ali as opposed to the two-hander of season 1 or the too-many hander of season 2. And Ali has been predictably great playing the three different versions of Wayne, but Stephen Dorff has also made the most of his supporting role through the first two episodes and he gets even more to do in 'The Big Never', a step up in quality from the second half of last week's premiere." Amy Glynn of Paste gave the episode an 8.4 out of 10 and wrote, "These men respect each other, whatever else is going on. They're at home with each other. For Hays, who never seems especially comfortable anywhere, that's got to be a real oasis. Even if it means he might be pulled back in by the still-missing Julie Purcell."

Keith Phipps of Vulture gave the episode a 3 star rating out of 5 and wrote, "Even at a comparatively compact eight episodes, True Detective still has a lot of space to fill. Right now, the bits that don't push the narrative forward feel much less compelling than the bits that do, though it's possible that could shift. Fortunately, the central narrative remains pretty captivating." Tony Sokol of Den of Geek gave the episode a 4.5 star rating out of 5 and wrote, "The first two episodes of True Detective season 3 felt like pincers were closing on an elusive target. 'The Big Never' ends leaving us with the feeling like scissors are opening up for another bite." Scott Tobias of The New York Times wrote, "Although the mystery has unfolded compellingly on this season of True Detective, with the three timelines relating to each other elegantly, it's a shame to think of Hays as a carbon-copy of detectives past, particularly given his racial differences and his seemingly more sober process. True Detective wouldn't be True Detective without a case ruining its hero's life, but it's fair to hope that Pizzolatto will ruin Hays's life in less expected ways."
