= The Final Country =

- True Detective episode
- Episode no.: Season 3 Episode 7
- Directed by: Daniel Sackheim
- Written by: Nic Pizzolatto
- Cinematography by: Germain McMicking
- Editing by: Leo Trombetta
- Original air date: February 17, 2019
- Running time: 57 minutes

Guest appearances
- Michael Rooker as Edward Hoyt; Brett Cullen as George Kindt; Sarah Gadon as Elisa Montgomery; Scott Shepherd as Harris James; Deborah Ayorinde as Becca Hayes; Emily Nelson as Margaret; James MacDonald as Major Blevins; Valeri Ross as Regina; Greg Bryan as Jay Bunda; Isaiah C. Morgan as Young Henry Hays; Kennedi Lynn Butler as Young Becca Hays; Emyri Crutchfield as Regina's Niece; Alex Collins as State Trooper; Timmy Sherrill as Motel Clerk; Paula Randol-Smith as Police Records Officer

Episode chronology
← Previous "Hunters in the Dark"	Next → "Now Am Found"
- True Detective (season 3)

"The Final Country" is the seventh episode of the third season of the American anthology crime drama television series True Detective. It is the 23rd overall episode of the series and was written by series creator Nic Pizzolatto, and directed by executive producer Daniel Sackheim. It was first broadcast on HBO in the United States on February 17, 2019.

The season takes place in the Ozarks over three separate time periods. In 1980, partner detectives Wayne Hays (Mahershala Ali) and Roland West (Stephen Dorff) as they investigate a macabre crime involving two missing children, Will and Julie Purcell. In 1990, Hays is questioned after the case is re-opened after new evidence resurfaces. In 2015, an old Hays with memory problems conducts an interview to discuss the case. In the episode, Tom's death closes the case but Hays and West decide to investigate on their own, targeting Harris James.

According to Nielsen Media Research, the episode was seen by an estimated 1.32 million household viewers and gained a 0.3 ratings share among adults aged 18–49. The episode received critical acclaim, with critics praising the performances, writing, directing, character development and pacing.

== Plot ==
=== 1980 ===
West (Stephen Dorff) visits Tom (Scoot McNairy), who has decided to move out of his house. Before he leaves, he hands him his phone number for any contact.

=== 1990 ===
Hays (Mahershala Ali) and West are called to a crime scene, where they discover Tom's corpse, along with a note suggesting suicide. With his death, the case is considered closed. Hays is not convinced, but West reprimands him, thinking their actions drove him to his "suicide".

Amelia (Carmen Ejogo) interviews a friend of Lucy's, who has a photograph of Will and Julie trick-or-treating on Halloween, with the chaff doll. In the background are two adults dressed as ghosts; one black and one white. Hays and West visit the motel where O'Brien was staying, finding he has disappeared (Note: "The Hour and the Day" earlier established that he was eventually found dead in a quarry a number of years later) and discovering evidence of his fight with Tom. At night, Amelia talks to a man, who states that O'Brien met a black man with one eye in a bar that Lucy used to work at. Hays impersonates West on the phone to ask for flight and phone records that involve Lucy.

The phone records indicate that Lucy talked with Harris James (Scott Shepherd), while the flight records show that James flew to Las Vegas the day before Lucy died and then left on the day after her death. Hays suggests that he may have placed Will's backpack on Woodard's porch, which could also implicate Hoyt Foods. West does not want to participate any further, as the investigation could negatively impact their careers, but Hays convinces him to do it.

They stop James in his car to question him. James resists, forcing Hays and West to aggressively take him to a barn. James claims not to be involved with the Purcells' disappearance. James releases himself from their custody and tries to kill Hays, forcing them to shoot him dead. After burying his body, West angrily confronts Hays for dragging him into this, severely straining their partnership. Hays returns home, where he burns his clothes. Amelia questions him about it, but he refuses to talk.

The next day, Hays is called by Edward Hoyt (Michael Rooker). Hoyt is aware of the events that happened last night and wants to talk with him immediately, revealing that his car is parked outside. When Hoyt threatens to talk with the authorities and even recognizes Hays' family, he complies to his demands. He exits the house, gets into the car and the car drives off.

=== 2015 ===
During their interview, Elisa (Sarah Gadon) wonders if the government wanted to cover the investigation by refusing to investigate further, as it could implicate a possible pedophile ring. She shows him evidence by finding a similar spiral symbol, which was the product of an investigation of two Louisiana State Police detectives, whose investigation was halted despite implicating other powerful people. (Note: Images of Rust Cohle (Matthew McConaughey) and Marty Hart (Woody Harrelson) are seen in a digital newspaper.) She also tells Hays about the black man with a milky eye who interrupted Amelia's public reading, identifying him as "Watts" (Note: As depicted in "Hunters in the Dark".) and suggesting he could be a "procurer" for the ring. Hays decides to exit the interview, as he feels his knowledge is limited.

Hays and West interview a former housekeeper of the Hoyt family, who reveals that Mr. Hoyt had a daughter, "Miss Isabel", who lost her husband and daughter in a car wreck in 1977, and was then involved in one herself. She lived in the basement, and only a black man with one eye, "Mr. June", was allowed to attend to her. During the encounter, he sees an hallucination of Becca (Deborah Ayorinde), product of his dementia.

Back home, Hays is once again disturbed by the car parked outside his house, which is finally seen by West. This time, he takes a baseball bat and goes outside to confront it. The car leaves, with Hays hitting it with the bat and West taking pictures of the license plate.

== Production ==
=== Development ===
In January 2019, the episode's title was revealed as "The Final Country" and it was announced that series creator Nic Pizzolatto had written the episode while executive producer Daniel Sackheim directed it. This was Pizzolatto's twenty-third writing credit, and Sackheim's third directing credit.

== Reception ==
=== Viewers ===
The episode was watched by 1.32 million viewers, earning a 0.3 in the 18-49 rating demographics on the Nielson ratings scale. This means that 0.3 percent of all households with televisions watched the episode. This was a 5% increase from the previous episode, which was watched by 1.25 million viewers with a 0.4 in the 18-49 demographics.

=== Critical reviews ===
"The Final Country" received critical acclaim. The review aggregator website Rotten Tomatoes reported a 100% approval rating for the episode, based on 13 reviews, with an average rating of 8.25/10. The site's consensus states: "True Detective deftly squares the flat circle in 'The Final County', providing crucial revelations for the season's conspiracy and its place in the series' broader mythos - all while dangling several tantalizingly loose threads for audiences to ponder until the finale."

Emily L. Stephens of The A.V. Club gave the episode a "B+" grade and wrote, "This week, it was more of the same: a beautifully shot, beautifully performed miasma of uncertainty — not the heady, complex ambiguity of the imponderable, but the lax indecision of a writer who doesn’t know quite what he wants to say."

Sean T. Collins of Rolling Stone wrote, "With only one episode to go, we still have a murder and a kidnapping to solve, an arch-enemy to meet, the mysteries of Wayne Hays' family and Roland West's friendships to unravel, not to mention a pair of old men to either kill or spare. But the real question remaining is whether this season can keep its track record of high quality intact into its final hour. No need for crooked spirals and weird dolls here: All signs point to yes." Lanre Bakare of The Guardian wrote, "Things are finally moving along, as the plot inches closer to season one's gothic overtones and some major revelations are unearthed." Ben Travers of IndieWire gave the episode an "A−" grade and wrote, "By connecting Season 3's intricate investigation with the original, Pizzolatto might be able to satisfy some of those slighted fans, three years later. Answers are probably coming for both cases, whether Rust and Marty pull up to hear them or not. Will they matter to the overall impact of Wayne’s story? No. Will they matter to True Detective? Absolutely."

Derek Lawrence of Entertainment Weekly wrote, "'The Final Country' will go down as one of season 3's stronger episodes, ending with a mysterious conclusion, but it will be best remembered for connecting this installment with the original series." Amy Glynn of Paste gave the episode an 8.4 out of 10 and wrote, "Time is melting a bit. Transitions among 1980, 1990 and 2015 are getting more abrupt and fluid."

Keith Phipps of Vulture gave the episode a 4 star rating out of 5 and wrote, "We know Wayne makes it. He's alive, if not well, in 2015 after all. But whatever happens over the course of the meeting solves nothing, leading only to another decade and a half of unanswered questions and an unshakable feeling of never being satisfied." Tony Sokol of Den of Geek gave the episode a perfect 5 star rating out of 5 and wrote, "In the 2015 timeline, Wayne mentions to Roland that he stopped pursuing the case because of a deal he made with Amelia. He says it so casually, you might not even think it that important. But like so many of the clues in True Detective, it is hidden in a very shallow grave." Scott Tobias of The New York Times wrote, "There are more mundane reasons that people continue to live in towns and neighborhoods like this after those communities have collapsed. But home is home, even when staying feels like tending a graveyard."
