= Hunters in the Dark (True Detective) =

- True Detective episode
- Episode no.: Season 3 Episode 6
- Directed by: Daniel Sackheim
- Written by: Graham Gordy; Nic Pizzolatto
- Cinematography by: Germain McMicking
- Editing by: Leo Trombetta
- Original air date: February 10, 2019
- Running time: 58 minutes

Guest appearances
- Brett Cullen as George Kindt; Sarah Gadon as Elisa Montgomery; Scott Shepherd as Harris James; Michael Graziadei as Dan O'Brien; Mamie Gummer as Lucy Purnell; Jon Tenney as Alan Jones; L. Warren Young as Detective; David Stanbra as Detective Segar; Gareth Williams as Police Chief Warren; Myk Watford as Detective Morelli; James MacDonald as Major Blevins; Steven Williams as Junius; Silvia McClure as Sister Alice; Lindsay Musil as Shelly; Nathan Wetherington as Mike Ardoin; Emily Nelson as Margaret; Isaiah C. Morgan as Henry Hays; Bill Kelly as Detective Hobbs; Lawrence Turner as Foreman; Cullen Moss as State Trooper; Lee Dawson as Officer Martin; Michael Klucher as Reporter; Jancey Sheats as News Anchor; Joshua Sackheim as Book Seller; Bea Santos as 21 Year Old Julie Purcell

Episode chronology
← Previous "If You Have Ghosts"	Next → "The Final Country"
- True Detective (season 3)

"Hunters in the Dark" is the sixth episode of the third season of the American anthology crime drama television series True Detective. It is the 22nd overall episode of the series and was written by Graham Gordy and series creator Nic Pizzolatto, and directed by executive producer Daniel Sackheim. It was first broadcast on HBO in the United States on February 10, 2019.

The season takes place in the Ozarks over three separate time periods. In 1980, partner detectives Wayne Hays (Mahershala Ali) and Roland West (Stephen Dorff) as they investigate a macabre crime involving two missing children, Will and Julie Purcell. In 1990, Hays is questioned after the case is re-opened after new evidence resurfaces. In 2015, an old Hays with memory problems conducts an interview to discuss the case. In the episode, Woodard's case is closed with the implication that he was responsible for Will's death and Julie's disappearance. In the other time periods, Hays and West continue investigating while Tom decides to investigate on his own.

According to Nielsen Media Research, the episode was seen by an estimated 1.25 million household viewers and gained a 0.3 ratings share among adults aged 18–49. The episode received extremely positive reviews from critics, who praised the performances (particularly Ali, Dorff and McNairy), directing, tension, writing, and ending.

== Plot ==
=== 1980 ===
After having sex, Hays (Mahershala Ali) and Amelia (Carmen Ejogo) talk in bed, where they bond over their professions and respective ideologies.

At the station, Hays is informed about recovering Will's backpack at Woodard's house, with further evidence suggesting that Julie was burned by Woodard. The officers also intend to blame Woodard for the disappearances and killings of other children in the area, disillusioning Hays. Kindt (Brett Cullen) publicly discloses the information to the public, condemning Woodard. Lucy (Mamie Gummer) is in attendance and leaves early. Amelia tries to talk to her but she rebuffs her.

=== 1990 ===
Kindt tells Hays and West (Stephen Dorff) to investigate Tom (Scoot McNairy), suggesting that he could be involved with the girl. They question Tom about the night of the kids' disappearance, as he forgot to disclose many details. His behavior makes Kindt convinced that Tom was involved in the disappearance along with Brett Woodard. Tracing the call to a gas station in Russellville, and they recover some possible fingerprints. As they visit the Purcell house, they also find evidence indicating that Tom is a closet homosexual.

Hays and West decide to question Harris James (Scott Shepherd), who investigated the backpack incident and now works for Hoyt Foods as head of security. James acknowledges to being involved, although he wasn't the person who discovered the backpacks or reported it until two days later. He also claims to not have known that Lucy worked at Hoyt Foods. They later meet with Dan O'Brien (Michael Graziadei), who wants $7,000 for speaking about new information; he implies that Lucy, who is thought to have died of a drug overdose, was actually murdered to stop her telling people what she knew about the case. Despite being threatened, he maintains his position, giving them one day to get the money.

Tom lurks through the police station looking for West, and overhears the FBI agents talking about West and Hays meeting with O'Brien. They also reveal that they are asking for phone records from a Nevada motel for a conversation that happened two months ago involving Lucy. Tom confronts O'Brien at his motel room, brutally attacking him. He forces him to reveal anything he knows; O'Brien explains that he knows a man who had been paying money to Lucy before she died just to keep her quiet from disclosing the events. On his own, Hays returns to the abandoned Purcell house and makes a conclusion on the peep hole.

Amelia publishes her book, which is warmly received. However, during a Q&A, she is questioned by a black man with a milky eye (Steven Williams) about the fate of Julie and her possible location. He accuses her of profiting off the tragedy and leaves the session. At night, Tom sneaks into Hoyt Foods' owner Edward Hoyt's (Michael Rooker) mansion. He wanders through the mansion, even though he is being watched over the cameras. Descending to the basement, he discovers a pink room and stares in horror at something off-screen, uttering "Julie?" Behind him, Harris James appears.

=== 2015 ===
In another interview, Hays is questioned by Elisa (Sarah Gadon) over Tom's possible role in placing the backpacks on Woodard's house and they both wonder about James' possible disappearance since 1990. After he leaves, he also talks with Henry (Ray Fisher), as he knows he is having an affair with Elisa despite being married.

Hays reveals to West that he concluded that the "peep hole" at the Purcell house was actually used by Will and Julie to pass comforting notes when their parents were fighting. Hays leaves for a moment, and West starts checking on some books. When Hays returns, he has forgotten West. He asks him to check outside to see if there is a parked car, which West claims it is not there.

== Production ==
=== Development ===
In January 2019, the episode's title was revealed as "Hunters in the Dark" and it was announced that Graham Gordy and series creator Nic Pizzolatto had written the episode while executive producer Daniel Sackheim directed it. This was Gordy's first writing credit, Pizzolatto's twenty-second writing credit, and Sackheim's second directing credit.

== Reception ==
=== Viewers ===
The episode was watched by 1.25 million viewers, earning a 0.3 in the 18-49 rating demographics on the Nielson ratings scale. This means that 0.3 percent of all households with televisions watched the episode. This was a 42% increase from the previous episode, which was watched by 0.88 million viewers with a 0.2 in the 18-49 demographics.

=== Critical reviews ===
"Hunters in the Dark" received extremely positive reviews from critics. The review aggregator website Rotten Tomatoes reported a 100% approval rating for the episode, based on 12 reviews, with an average rating of 8.67/10. The site's consensus states: "True Detective's fragmented timelines begin to crash into one another in a thrilling installment that teases out a depraved conspiracy while delivering on the series' reputation for haunting imagery and sage dialogue."

Emily L. Stephens of The A.V. Club gave the episode a "B+" grade and wrote, "'Hunters In The Dark' heightens both the compelling mystery and the eerie aesthetic of season three. But a show that follows an enigmatic, charismatic black lead from 1980 to 2015 is packed with opportunities to explore the racial dynamics of its times, and to see how they've shifted over time—or, tellingly, not shifted. Six episodes into an eight-episode season, this is just one more opportunity True Detective has squandered."

Sean T. Collins of Rolling Stone wrote, "True Detective Season Three has turned into a show about how a single, central crime spreads like a spiderweb into a whole host of small-town sins. Racism and sexism, poverty and class warfare, sexism and homophobia, addiction and religion: They all play a part here." Lanre Bakare of The Guardian wrote, "New suspects and leads emerge as Hays and West continue their investigation. But just what is the elusive 'pink castle'?" Ben Travers of IndieWire gave the episode a "B+" grade and wrote, "While no one is claiming Season 3 has reached the addictive highs of the original run, it does seem to be on the brink of rewarding both parts of its big ol' brain: an enriching personal story, and a well-executed conspiracy-driven twist."

Darren Franich of Entertainment Weekly wrote, "This episode bent over backwards to juice this season's slow-paced plot towards a reckoning. At this point, I am mainly watching True Detective to root for Elisa Montgomery, the 2015 documentarian. 'Have you ever sat back at any point over the last two decades', she asks Wayne, 'and thought about the sheer number of fatalities surrounding this case?' She sounds incredulous. She can't believe this crap, and neither can I." Amy Glynn of Paste gave the episode an 8.5 out of 10 and wrote, "This episode has a strong, continuous focus on close shots of lit cigarettes. Presumably, they're a visual metaphor for things that dwindle and diminish. Memories. Potential. Time."

Keith Phipps of Vulture gave the episode a 3 star rating out of 5 and wrote, "But for the third season to prove as memorable as the first, it will have to find a balance in the home stretch. From the start, Pizzolatto's been interested in exploring questions deeper than 'Whodunnit?', but at the moment that's the engine driving the show." Tony Sokol of Den of Geek gave the episode a perfect 5 star rating out of 5 and wrote, "True Detective episodes don't end on mere cliffhangers and reveals. They end on moments of excruciating anticipation, like the tripping of a claymore, or a door opening on a pink room in a mansion that’s defended like a castle. Without giving too much away, the head of security is a knight in something less than shining armor. 'Hunters in the Dark' almost gives us a chance to catch our breath after an upward climb which feels like deep descent." Scott Tobias of The New York Times wrote, "It seems to be Nic Pizzolatto's instinct to make True Detective a big show, about simple crimes that open up into expansive indictments of the shadowy networks that make them possible."
