= If You Have Ghosts =

If You Have Ghosts may refer to:

- "If You Have Ghosts", a song by Roky Erickson from his 1981 album The Evil One
- "If You Have Ghosts" (True Detective), an episode of the American television series True Detective

== See also ==
- If You Have Ghost, an EP by the Swedish band Ghost
