= Kiss Tomorrow Goodbye =

Kiss Tomorrow Goodbye may refer to:

- Kiss Tomorrow Goodbye (film), a 1950 film starring James Cagney based on the novel
- Kiss Tomorrow Goodbye (True Detective), an episode of the television series True Detective
- "Kiss Tomorrow Goodbye" (song), by Luke Bryan
- Kiss Tomorrow Goodbye, a 1948 novel by Horace McCoy
- Kiss Tomorrow Goodbye, a 2000 TV movie starring Jason Priestley and Kari Wuhrer
