= The Great War and Modern Memory (True Detective) =

- True Detective episode
- Detective Wayne Hays examines the crime scene of missing people
- Episode no.: Season 3 Episode 1
- Directed by: Jeremy Saulnier
- Written by: Nic Pizzolatto
- Cinematography by: Germain McMicking
- Editing by: Leo Trombetta
- Original air date: January 13, 2019
- Running time: 58 minutes

Guest appearances
- Jon Tenney as Alan Jones; Josh Hopkins as Jim Dobkins; Mamie Gummer as Lucy Purcell; Sarah Gadon as Elisa Montgomery; Rhys Wakefield as Freddy Burns; Brandon Flynn as Ryan Peters; Richard Meehan as Frankie Boyle; Michael Greyeyes as Brett Woodard; Phoenix Elkin as Will Purcell; Lena McCarthy as Julie Purcell; Emily Nelson as Margaret; Corbin B. Pitts as Mike Ardoin; Lennon Morgan as Ronnie Boyle; Nick Basta as James Boyle; John Charles Dickson as Young Deputy; Grant Hockenbrough as Deputy O'Bannon; Katherine Forbes as Smoking Woman; Julia Lashae as Woman #1; Tim Caffrey as Man #1; Brad S. Clayton as Man #2; Samantha Rae Soard as Teenage Girl; Jancey Sheats as News Anchor

Episode chronology
← Previous "Omega Station"	Next → "Kiss Tomorrow Goodbye"
- True Detective (season 3)

"The Great War and Modern Memory" is the first episode of the third season of the American anthology crime drama television series True Detective. It is the 17th overall episode of the series and was written by series creator Nic Pizzolatto, and directed by Jeremy Saulnier. It was first broadcast on HBO in the United States on January 13, 2019, airing back-to-back with the follow-up episode, "Kiss Tomorrow Goodbye".

The season takes place in the Ozarks over three separate time periods. In 1980, partner detectives Wayne Hays (Mahershala Ali) and Roland West (Stephen Dorff) investigate a macabre crime involving two missing children, Will and Julie Purcell. In 1990, Hays is questioned after the case is re-opened after new evidence resurfaces. In 2015, an old Hays with memory problems conducts an interview to discuss the case.

According to Nielsen Media Research, the episode was seen by an estimated 1.44 million household viewers and gained a 0.5 ratings share among adults aged 18–49. The episode received very positive reviews from critics, who deemed the episode as a return to form for the series, as well as praising Mahershala Ali's performance and Saulnier's directing.

== Plot ==
=== 1980 ===
November 7, 1980. In the fictional Ozarks city of West Finger, Arkansas, two kids named Will (Phoenix Elkin) and Julie Purcell (Lena McCarthy) ask their father, Tom (Scoot McNairy), to leave for a playground to meet with a friend, which he allows but tells them to return before the night. As night falls, Will and Julie haven't returned and Tom discovers they never met with their friend, so he drives around town looking for them. With no success, he calls the police.

Arkansas State Police Detectives Wayne Hays (Mahershala Ali) and Roland West (Stephen Dorff) are called to the case. They put out an all-points bulletin on the children and decide to check on the Purcell home. Evidence points that Tom and his wife Lucy (Mamie Gummer) are in a strained relationship and they wonder if she took the children. Their theory is debunked when Lucy arrives home and is angered at Tom for their disappearance. Hays discovers Playboy magazines beneath Will's mattress, which Tom never saw or bought. West also discovers that Will's closet had a hole, which connects to Julie's bedroom. As they round up a list of possible suspects, Hays and West are informed that Lucy's cousin, Dan O'Brien, was staying with the Purcells and slept in Will's bedroom while Will slept on the couch.

Hays and West then question Amelia Reardon (Carmen Ejogo), Will's English schoolteacher. They also question some of the students, including Freddy Burns (Rhys Wakefield), who claims to have seen the kids shortly after they left their house. They then visit Brett Woodard (Michael Greyeyes), a Native American trash collector. While Woodard isn't home, they enter his house and find out that he is a Vietnam War veteran, just like Hays and West and they issue an all-points bulletin on him.

As the search continues through town, Hays uses his Vietnam's tracking skills to find a ranger's town in the woods. Nearby, he discovers one of the bikes and some man-made cornhusk dolls around the trees. He discovers a cave, and inside, is horrified to find Will's corpse, with his fingers interlinked as if in prayer. Later, as authorities inspect the area, Hays leaves to find Julie.

=== 1990 ===
Hays is questioned about the case by attorneys Alan Jones (Jon Tenney) and Jim Dobkins (Josh Hopkins), as new evidence prompted them to re-open the case as they got the wrong person responsible for the crime. During the interview, they suggest that Hays may have some memory problems, something that he rebuffs. As Hays starts to leave, Jones informs him that a robbery at a Walgreens in Sallisaw, Oklahoma a few months ago identified Julie's fingerprints in the scene, indicating that she is still alive, surprising him.

=== 2015 ===
Hays suffers from memory loss and keeps recordings for himself, with the help of his son Henry (Ray Fisher). He also participates in an interview with Elisa Montgomery (Sarah Gadon) for a series, True Criminal. His interview includes many of his police experiences, also revealing that Amelia has already passed away. As he begins to talk about Woodard, he decides to exit the interview early.

== Production ==
=== Development ===
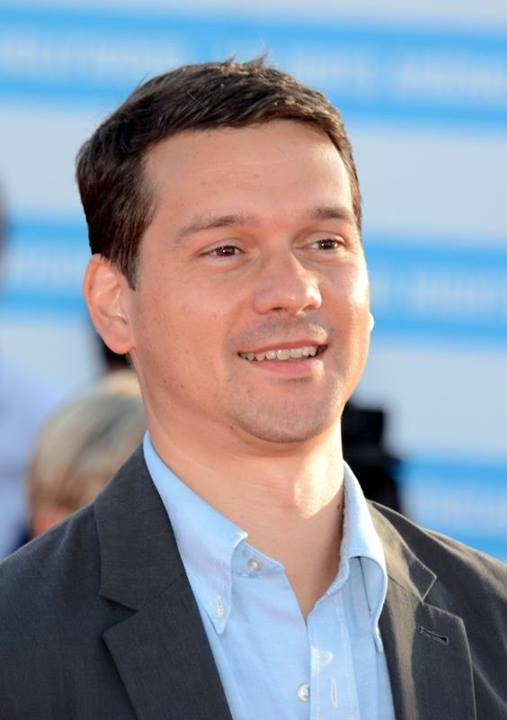
Jeremy Saulnier directed the episode.

In August 2017, HBO officially confirmed that True Detective would return with a third season. Nic Pizzolatto would once again serve as a writer and also confirming that Jeremy Saulnier would direct the first episodes.

In January 2019, the episode's title was revealed as "The Great War and Modern Memory" and it was announced that series creator Nic Pizzolatto had written the episode while Jeremy Saulnier had directed it. This was Pizzolatto's seventeenth writing credit, and Saulnier's first directing credit for the series.

=== Casting ===
In June 2017, it was reported that Mahershala Ali was in early discussions with HBO to play the lead role of the season. In an interview with Variety, Ali revealed that he was originally offered a supporting role, as the main character was supposed to be white. However, pursuing a better choice for his career, he convinced Pizzolatto that he was suited for the lead.

In November 2017, Carmen Ejogo was announced to star alongside Ali, in the role of schoolteacher Amelia Reardon, and in January 2018, Stephen Dorff was announced to play the co-lead role of partner detective Roland West. Joining them in a series regular role, Ray Fisher plays Wayne Hays' son Henry, while Scoot McNairy also joined as Tom Purcell.

== Reception ==
=== Viewers ===
The episode was watched by 1.44 million viewers, earning a 0.5 in the 18-49 rating demographics on the Nielsen ratings scale. This means that 0.5 percent of all households with televisions watched the episode. This was a 48% decrease from the previous episode, which was watched by 2.73 million viewers with a 1.2 in the 18-49 demographics. It was also a 55% decrease from the previous season premiere, which was watched by 3.17 million viewers with a 1.4 in the 18-49 demographics.

=== Critical reviews ===
"The Great War and Modern Memory" received very positive reviews from critics. The review aggregator website Rotten Tomatoes reported a 94% approval rating for the episode, based on 16 reviews, with an average rating of 8.23/10. The site's consensus states: "Briskly re-establishing the series' status quo, 'The Great War and Modern Memory' economically fleshes out a mystery and world that will be familiar to True Detective fans, with a triptych time structure adding an intriguing new dimension to proceedings."

Candice Frederick of IGN gave the episode an "amazing" 9 out of 10 and wrote in her verdict, "While many may have written off True Detective for good after the inconsistent season 2, fans will take comfort in the fact that one of the tautest thrillers has gotten back on course. If the season 3 premiere is any indication, we're in for jaw-dropping twists, genuinely crushing moments, and a truly sinister tale."

Emily L. Stephens of The A.V. Club gave the episode a "B+" grade and wrote, "The pace is taut, unafraid of long pauses and tension that evaporates into nothing. The visuals are austere and forbidding: broad aerial shots of the Ozarks as autumn leans into a long winter, the matter-of-fact grime of everyday work. And Mahershala Ali's performance lends the first two episodes a grace and gravity far beyond what it's earned. Here's hoping the remaining six prove the show, not just the actors, deserve it."

Sean T. Collins of Rolling Stone wrote, "That's the kind of thing that makes us optimistic about what's to come. No high weirdness, no convoluted California noir — just a bunch of (mostly) well-drawn characters doing their best, even if their best isn't very good. People aren't going to freak out about this the way they did about the first two seasons, for better or for worse. But judging from the Season's Three opening one-two punch, they're apt to quiet down and listen." Lanre Bakare of The Guardian wrote, "Mahershala Ali investigates the case of two missing children in a tricksy, time-shifting third season of the crime drama. Best start taking notes." Ben Travers of IndieWire gave the episode a "B+" grade and wrote, "If you felt the premiere was a little familiar (or just a little slow), Ali should be enough for even the most skeptical to hold on for another ride."

Derek Lawrence of Entertainment Weekly wrote, "After becoming a phenomenon and critical and commercial darling with the Matthew McConaughey and Woody Harrelson-fronted first season, True Detective lost viewers and momentum with a disappointing follow-up. But for the long-awaited season 3, Pizzolatto and the show are returning to its roots by heading back to the south, framing the plot through multiple timelines, and featuring an actor in the midst of an awards season run." Amy Glynn of Paste gave the episode an 8.4 out of 10 and wrote, "Time is a flat circle. So is a bicycle tire. So is the harvest moon reflected in a mud-puddle, and so is a spotlight. And it's hard to say whether the memories you can't let go are crueler than the ones you can't retain. According to this episode, it's a toss-up."

Keith Phipps of Vulture gave the episode a 4 star rating out of 5 and wrote, "If season one was the stunning debut album and season two the alienating second-album experiment that didn't quite work out but inspired passionate defenders, season three plays — at least in these first two episodes — like a band trying to remind fans why they fell in love with them in the first place." Tony Sokol of Den of Geek gave the episode a 4.5 star rating out of 5 and wrote, "The moving between timelines is seamless in its storytelling. Hays' mind puts the pieces together like he's cutting film, between the holes in his memory and the sanctimonious prattle he and his son have to endure from the documentary interviewer. 'The Great War and Modern Memory' establishes itself immediately with the acting, atmosphere and the promise of twists to come."
