= Kiss Tomorrow Goodbye (True Detective) =

- True Detective episode
- Episode no.: Season 3 Episode 2
- Directed by: Jeremy Saulnier
- Written by: Nic Pizzolatto
- Cinematography by: Germain McMicking
- Editing by: Leo Trombetta
- Original air date: January 13, 2019
- Running time: 57 minutes

Guest appearances
- Brett Cullen as George Kindt; Sarah Gadon as Elisa Montgomery; Michael Graziadei as Dan O'Brien; Michael Greyeyes as Brett Woodard; Mamie Gummer as Lucy Purcell; Emily Nelson as Margaret; Josh Hopkins as Jim Dobkins; Jon Tenney as Alan Jones; Rhys Wakefield as Freddy Burns; Gareth Williams as Police Chief Warren; Michael Broderick as Agent John Bowen; Tim Griffin as Agent Burt Diller; Shawn-Caulin Young as Ted LaGrange; Brandon Flynn as Ryan Peters; Richard Meehan as Frankie Boyle; Sola Bamis as Heather Hays; Bailey Rae Fenderson as Amy Hays; Jaiden McLeod as Alexander McLeod; Kennedi Lynn Butler as Young Becca Hays; Isaiah C. Morgan as Young Henry Hays; Natalie Canerday as Louise Purcell; David Jensen as Roy Purcell; Thomas W. Moore as Worried Man; Brian Oerly as Eddie; Sara Edgerton as Worried Woman; Michael Klucher as Reporter; Michael Papajohn as Vice Cop; Jennifer Pierce Mathus as Daycare Matron; Alyson Courtney as TV Anchor; Corbin B. Pitts as Mike Ardoin; Lawrence Turner as Foreman; Keith Hudson as Ernest; Josh David Whites as Joe; Cody Shelton as Don

Episode chronology
← Previous "The Great War and Modern Memory"	Next → "The Big Never"
- True Detective (season 3)

"Kiss Tomorrow Goodbye" is the second episode of the third season of the American anthology crime drama television series True Detective. It is the 18th overall episode of the series and was written by series creator Nic Pizzolatto, and directed by Jeremy Saulnier. It was first broadcast on HBO in the United States on January 13, 2019, airing back-to-back with the previous episode, "The Great War and Modern Memory".

The season takes place in the Ozarks over three separate time periods. In 1980, partner detectives Wayne Hays (Mahershala Ali) and Roland West (Stephen Dorff) as they investigate a macabre crime involving two missing children, Will and Julie Purcell. In 1990, Hays is questioned after the case is re-opened after new evidence resurfaces. In 2015, an old Hays with memory problems conducts an interview to discuss the case. In the episode, Will's body's discovery impacts the Purcells while Hays and West continue looking for Julie.

According to Nielsen Media Research, the episode was seen by an estimated 1.19 million household viewers and gained a 0.3 ratings share among adults aged 18–49. The episode received very positive reviews from critics, who praised the writing, character development, directing and Mahershala Ali's performance.

== Plot ==
=== 1980 ===
Will's autopsy indicates that he had a broken neck before being taken to the cave. Hays (Mahershala Ali) and West (Stephen Dorff) question some of Tom's (Scoot McNairy) co-workers and also interrogate Brett Woodard (Michael Greyeyes), who claims to have seen the kids on the day of the disappearance, but he is not certain where they were going.

At a community center, District Attorney Gerald Kindt (Brett Cullen) announces a curfew throughout the city, despite some objecting. Hays and West visit the meeting, noticing Amelia (Carmen Ejogo) among the crowd. He questions her about the chaff dolls he found at the cave, which she can't fully identify. The next day, Hays and West are informed by Kindt that they will work with FBI Agents Burt Diller (Tim Griffin) and John Bowen (Michael Broderick) in the case, with Hays and West exclusively focusing on Will's murder.

At Will's funeral, they question Dan O'Brien (Michael Graziadei), who confirms to having provided Will with the Playboy magazines. He also confirms that Tom and Lucy (Mamie Gummer) constantly fought, forcing Will and Julie to play outside. They also talk with Tom's parents, who both express doubt over Julie's real father, suggesting that Lucy had an affair. Despite Will's death, Tom immediately returns back to work at his factory. His co-workers try to give him a break, as they feel his feelings could impact their productivity, so Tom angrily quits the factory. He is later picked up by Hays and West when he is seen walking home.

Amelia is informed by a student about the dolls and brings Hays and West with the kid. He reveals that he went with Julie on Halloween to trick-or-treat, where Julie was given a similar doll from an unknown person. They try to convince Kindt in allowing them to search the area's households and find similar dolls but Kindt refuses as he fears it will cause a privacy issue. Later, Hays talks with Amelia at a bar, when they see Kindt on television disclosing the case's progress, insinuating that Julie met the kidnapper on Halloween, angering Hays.

With a tip from a fellow officer, Hays and West go to Fort Smith to question Ted LaGrange (Shawn-Caulin Young), a man convicted of raping a child who just got released on parole. They take him to a barn to beat him and reveal any possible role in the case, as he was absent from his house when the kids went missing. They interview his co-worker at a day care and realize that he worked past the time the kids left the house, but warn her to not hire him back for his past. They then decide to report LaGrange's violation of his parole, which will send him to prison and is warned to not speak about them. At night, they are called back to the Purcell home, where Tom and Lucy have received a note. The note claims that Julie is safe and that they need to let her go.

=== 1990 ===
After his interrogation, Hays leaves with Jones (Jon Tenney) to a bar. Jones claims that the investigation focuses on Julie, and they are still waiting to see if she committed the robbery or if she was a customer at the Walgreens. Later, Hays goes home with his family, that includes his kids and wife, Amelia. Amelia is writing a book about the Purcells, and is surprised when Hays reveals that Julie is alive.

=== 2015 ===
Driven by Henry (Ray Fisher), Hays visits some of the old establishments he investigated. During a conversation, he expresses to miss Amelia and also shares frustration with the interview. He is forced to return. Before the interview, Elisa (Sarah Gadon) shares some theories that circulated in Internet, such as suggesting that the dolls were a sign of a pedophile ring.

After the interview, Hays dines with Henry and family. Hays mentions wanting to see his daughter Rebecca, who is living in Los Angeles. He exhibits some confusion and memory problems, prompting Henry to leave the table in frustration. Suddenly, Hays finds himself in the street and in pajamas, with no idea of how he got there in the middle of the night. He is horrified to find himself in front of a demolished house.

== Production ==
=== Development ===
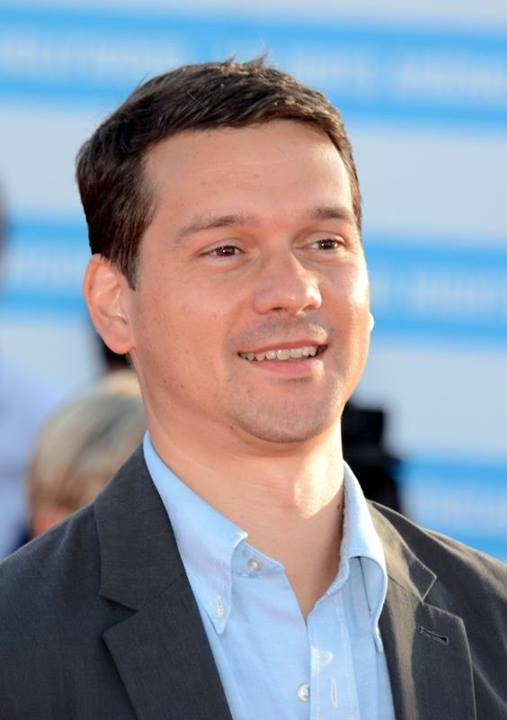
Jeremy Saulnier directed the episode.

In January 2019, the episode's title was revealed as "Kiss Tomorrow Goodbye" and it was announced that series creator Nic Pizzolatto had written the episode while Jeremy Saulnier had directed it. This was Pizzolatto's eighteenth writing credit, and Saulnier's second directing credit. This was Saulnier's last episode for the series; he exited after filming the episode, as it had become clear that filming would take longer than expected to complete.

== Reception ==
=== Viewers ===
The episode was watched by 1.19 million viewers, earning a 0.3 in the 18-49 rating demographics on the Nielsen ratings scale. This means that 0.3 percent of all households with televisions watched the episode. This was an 18% decrease from the previous episode, which was watched by 1.44 million viewers with a 0.5 in the 18-49 demographics.

=== Critical reviews ===
"Kiss Tomorrow Goodbye" received very positive reviews from critics. The review aggregator website Rotten Tomatoes reported a 100% approval rating for the episode, based on 14 reviews, with an average rating of 7.92/10. The site's consensus states: "'Kiss Tomorrow Goodbye' gives True Detective viewers a proper introduction to Mahershala Ali's haunted protagonist, Wayne Haynes, who proves to be a compelling enough figure to hold attention during this methodically paced installment."

Emily L. Stephens of The A.V. Club gave the episode a "B+" grade and wrote, "The pace is taut, unafraid of long pauses and tension that evaporates into nothing. The visuals are austere and forbidding: broad aerial shots of the Ozarks as autumn leans into a long winter, the matter-of-fact grime of everyday work. And Mahershala Ali's performance lends the first two episodes a grace and gravity far beyond what it's earned. Here's hoping the remaining six prove the show, not just the actors, deserve it."

Sean T. Collins of Rolling Stone wrote, "That's the kind of thing that makes us optimistic about what's to come. No high weirdness, no convoluted California noir — just a bunch of (mostly) well-drawn characters doing their best, even if their best isn't very good. People aren't going to freak out about this the way they did about the first two seasons, for better or for worse. But judging from the Season's Three opening one-two punch, they're apt to quiet down and listen." Lanre Bakare of The Guardian wrote, "Mahershala Ali investigates the case of two missing children in a tricksy, time-shifting third season of the crime drama. Best start taking notes." Ben Travers of IndieWire gave the episode a "B+" grade and wrote, "If you felt the premiere was a little familiar (or just a little slow), Ali should be enough for even the most skeptical to hold on for another ride."

Derek Lawrence of Entertainment Weekly wrote, "You waited three-plus years for more True Detective, so the good people at HBO made sure you didn't have to wait another week for a second episode! After starting the season with an intriguing mystery, the HBO series slows down and takes a step back with the next installment, 'Kiss Tomorrow Goodbye.'" Amy Glynn of Paste gave the episode an 8.5 out of 10 and wrote, "In the development of dementia, there is sometimes a silver lining, in that losing your memory can release you from memories you wish you didn't have. It can occasion a sort of beneficent calm as the person loses track of old resentments and grudges. That tranquility comes at a huge price, but for some people it's part of the story. Wayne Hays isn't there yet. He still remembers too much."

Keith Phipps of Vulture gave the episode a 4 star rating out of 5 and wrote, "If season one was the stunning debut album and season two the alienating second-album experiment that didn't quite work out but inspired passionate defenders, season three plays — at least in these first two episodes — like a band trying to remind fans why they fell in love with them in the first place." Tony Sokol of Den of Geek gave the episode a 4.5 star rating out of 5 and wrote, "This is a great follow-up to the opening, the audience is fully committed to this crime."
