= Galveston (film) =

- Theatrical release poster
- Directed by: Mélanie Laurent
- Screenplay by: Nic Pizzolatto (Note: Pizzolatto is credited under the name "Jim Hammett" per his request as he felt that Laurent's additions to his original script turned the film into something that did not reflect his vision.)
- Based on: Galveston by Nic Pizzolatto
- Produced by: Patrick Daly; Tyler Davidson; Jean Doumanian
- Starring: Ben Foster; Elle Fanning; Lili Reinhart; Adepero Oduye; Robert Aramayo; María Valverde; CK McFarland; Beau Bridges
- Cinematography: Arnaud Potier
- Edited by: Joseph Krings
- Music by: Marc Chouarain
- Production companies: Jean Doumanian Productions; Low Spark Films
- Distributed by: RLJE Films
- Release dates: March 10, 2018 (SXSW); October 19, 2018 (United States)
- Running time: 94 minutes
- Country: United States
- Language: English
- Box office: $225,795

Galveston is a 2018 American independent Southern noir crime thriller film directed by Mélanie Laurent in her English-language directorial debut. It is written by Nic Pizzolatto (under the pseudonym "Jim Hammett") and based on his 2010 novel of the same name. It follows a dying Texas hitman (Ben Foster), who escapes a set up in New Orleans and heads to the titular town to plan his revenge, taking a young girl who was kidnapped by his boss (Elle Fanning).

The film had its world premiere at South by Southwest on March 10, 2018. It was released by RLJE Films on October 19, 2018.

== Plot ==
In 1988 New Orleans, hitman Roy Cady is diagnosed with terminal lung cancer and storms out of his doctor's office. Roy is a heavy-drinking criminal enforcer and contract killer whose boss sets him up in a double-cross scheme. After killing his would-be assassins before they could kill him, Roy discovers Rocky, a young escort being held captive and reluctantly takes her with him on his escape.

On the drive to Roy's hometown of Galveston, Texas, Rocky tells him she thought it was a legitimate business because she found it in the yellow pages and had no idea how it really was. They stop and get drunk at a bar, and Rocky offers sexual favors to Roy, but he rebuffs her. The next morning, Rocky asks Roy to stop because she says she can get money owed to her. Roy, sitting in the car hears a gunshot, and Rocky returns to the car with her three-year-old sister Tiffany. Rocky tells Roy that she fired a shot at the wall and didn't hurt anyone, but Roy later finds out that Rocky shot and killed her stepfather.

After Roy leaves for a few days and reconciles with an ex from the past he returns to find out Rocky's real story, and that she (thinking he left for good) is escorting again. He then finds out Tiffany, who she claimed was her sister, is really her daughter, by her stepfather in rape. Roy calls his old boss to blackmail him with incriminating documents found during the failed sting, demanding $75,000 to stay silent. Determined to find safety and sanctuary in Galveston, he tells Rocky that he will give her the money and convinces her to go to school and become something.

Just as Roy and Rocky finally start recognizing their feelings for one another on a date at a local bar, they are captured by a crew belonging to Roy's old boss. They are separated, and Roy is severely beaten. After a while, a woman from his past finds him and frees him, telling him to flee before someone finds him. He looks for Rocky to find her dead in another room from a brutal beating and gang rape. Roy escapes the compound, killing a bodyguard outside and taking his car and gun. He is emotionally distraught as he leaves and is involved in a car accident. He wakes in a hospital where a nurse tells him that he has aspergillosis, not cancer, and his condition is treatable by the state.

Roy is arrested on multiple charges and sent to jail. His former boss' lawyer meets with him and implies they know where Tiffany is and will kill her and the motel staff if he talks to the police. Because of his love for Rocky and Tiffany, he stays silent until he is released 20 years later. Tiffany, now an adult, shows up at his door as the town is preparing for Hurricane Ike. Roy says he will tell her the truth, but then he wants her to leave for her safety. He tells her that Rocky was actually her mother and she was not abandoned, giving her much needed closure. Roy is then seen walking toward the beach as he experiences flashbacks of Rocky.

== Cast ==
- Ben Foster as Roy Cady
- Elle Fanning as Rocky Arceneaux
- Lili Reinhart as Tiffany
  - Anniston and Tinsley Price as Young Tiffany
- Adepero Oduye as Loraine
- Robert Aramayo as Tray
- María Valverde as Carmen
- Beau Bridges as Stan Pitco
- CK McFarland as Nancy

== Production ==
In November 2016, it was announced Elle Fanning and Ben Foster had joined the cast of the film, with Mélanie Laurent directing, from a screenplay written by Nic Pizzolatto who wrote the novel of the same name. Tyler Davidson, Jean Doumanian, Patrick Daly, Kevin Flanigan and Sean O’Brien would serve as producers and executive producers, under their Low Spark Films and Jean Doumanian banners. In February 2017, Lili Reinhart, Beau Bridges, María Valverde and Robert Aramayo joined the cast of the film. Marc Chouarain composed the film's score.

Per his request, Pizzolatto is credited under the pseudonym "Jim Hammett" as he felt that Laurent's contributions to his original script did not reflect his vision. Principal photography began in February 2017, and took place in Savannah, Georgia.

== Release ==
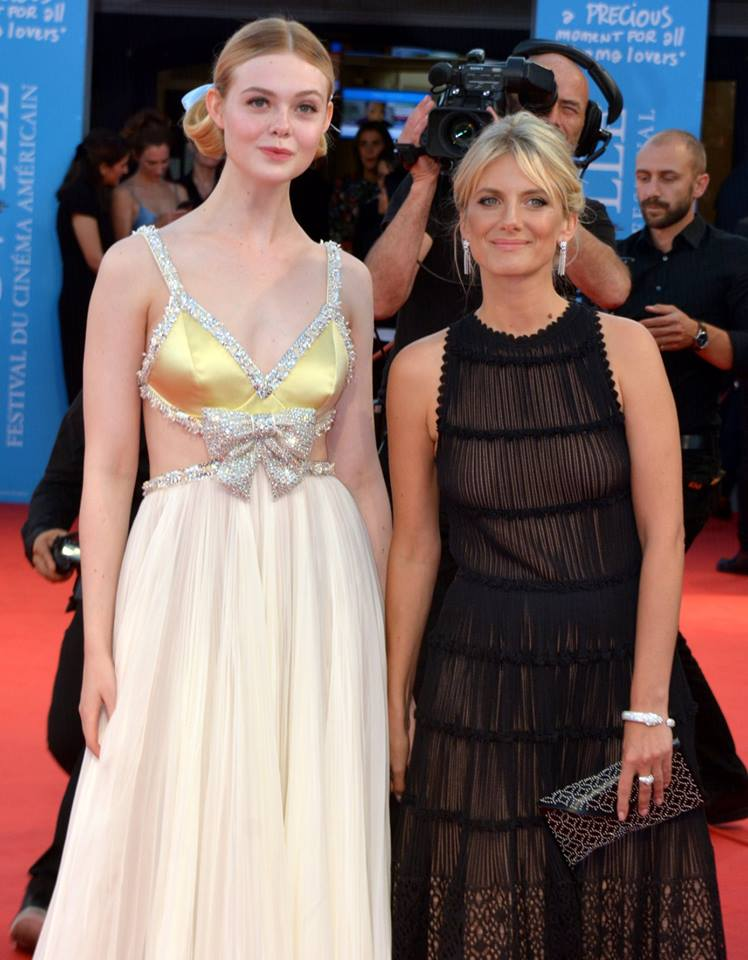
Lead actress Elle Fanning and director Mélanie Laurent promoting the film at the Deauville American Film Festival.

The film had its world premiere at South by Southwest on March 10, 2018. Shortly after, RLJE Films acquired distribution rights to the film. It also screened at the Los Angeles Film Festival on September 23, 2018. It was released on October 19, 2018.

== Critical reception ==
As of October 2021, the film holds a 72% approval rating on Rotten Tomatoes, based on 53 reviews, with an average rating of 6.3/10. The site's critical consensus reads "Galveston's talented cast - and confident direction from Mélanie Laurent - help set this uneven crime drama apart from less distinguished genre entries". On Metacritic, the film has a score of 57 out of 100, based on reviews from 17 critics, indicating "mixed or average" reviews.

Keith Watson of Slant Magazine gave the film 2 out of 4 stars, saying: "A pensive but plodding story of criminals on the run, Mélanie Laurent's Galveston is a moody, slow-burn drama that never quite catches fire." Peter Debruge of Variety called the film "tough, uncompromising, and hauntingly believable, just a little too slow and a lot too serious for today's typical action audiences." Matt Zoller Seitz of RogerEbert.com gave the film 3 out of 4 stars, writing that "despite its limitations, this is a consistently engrossing, sometimes powerful crime drama that feels rich despite its brief running time." Mike D'Angelo of The A.V. Club gave the film a "B−" grade, stating that "it confirms Laurent as a significant talent behind the lens, particularly adept at building queasy tension."
