= True Detective season 3 =

Season of television series

True Detective
- Season 3
- Promotional poster
- Showrunner: Nic Pizzolatto
- Starring: Mahershala Ali; Carmen Ejogo; Stephen Dorff; Scoot McNairy; Ray Fisher
- No. of episodes: 8

Release
- Original network: HBO
- Original release: January 13 – February 24, 2019

Season chronology
- ← Previous; Season 2 Next → Season 4

The third season of True Detective, an American anthology crime drama television series created by Nic Pizzolatto, was confirmed by HBO on August 31, 2017, and premiered on January 13, 2019. The story takes place in the Ozarks over three decades, as partner detectives investigate a macabre crime involving two missing children. The opening theme of the season is the song "Death Letter" written by Son House and performed by Cassandra Wilson from her 1995 album New Moon Daughter.

Mahershala Ali plays the lead role of detective Wayne Hays, while Stephen Dorff plays his partner, detective Roland West. Series creator Pizzolatto makes his directorial debut, sharing directing assignments with Jeremy Saulnier and Daniel Sackheim. Pizzolatto also serves as the showrunner and writer of most of the episodes, with the exception of the fourth and sixth, which he co-wrote with David Milch and Graham Gordy respectively.

== Production ==
=== Background ===
In November 2015, a few months after the conclusion of the second season, HBO reached an overall deal through 2018 with series creator and executive producer Nic Pizzolatto, that called for him to develop a number of new projects, that could include a third season of True Detective. Talking about the deal, the president of HBO programming Michael Lombardo stated, "I am thrilled to continue our relationship with Nic, as he is one of the most exceptionally talented writers and producers working today. I look forward to seeing where his unique creative vision will take us next."

Variety reported that the network had requested some changes for a third season, namely that Pizzolatto work with a staff of writers or with a new showrunner. These proposed changes were made in response to the less favorable reception that the second season received compared to the first, which was in part attributed to the lack of a creative counterpart to Pizzolatto. The strong artistic input from Cary Joji Fukunaga, who had directed all eight episodes in the first season, was thought to have benefited the show. By contrast, the second season enlisted a number of directors, effectively leaving Pizzolatto free to create the season on his own. In June 2015, in an interview with Vanity Fair, Pizzolatto had stated, "If I'm making a movie or a show or whatever, I'm expressing something on a personal level or else it doesn't mean anything to me. If I'm doing that, it works better without a committee."

=== Development ===
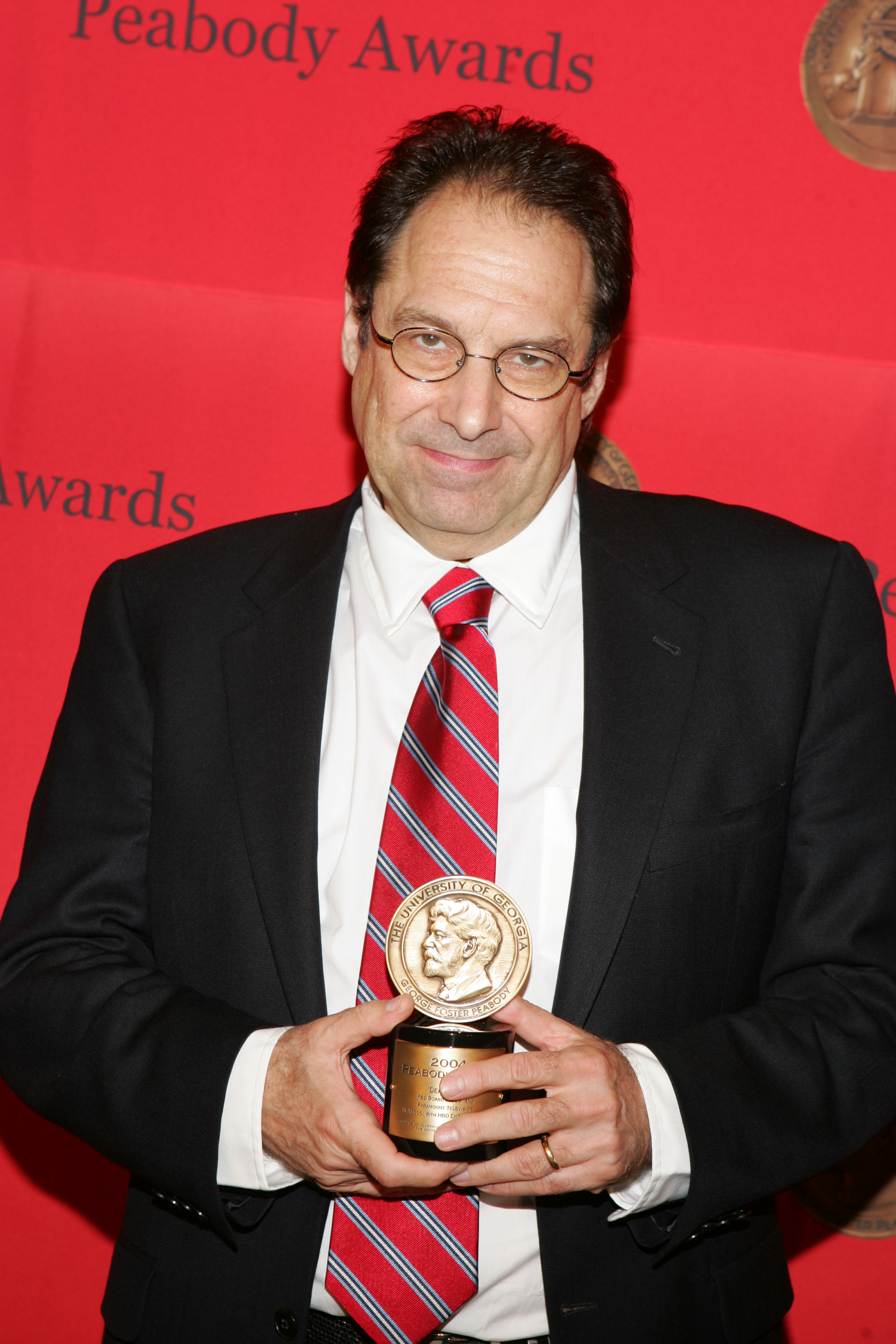
David Milch was involved in writing the anthology's third season.

In July 2016, Casey Bloys, who had succeeded Lombardo as HBO head of programming two months earlier, confirmed plans for a third season, describing True Detective as "a valuable franchise" and revealing that both the network and creator Pizzolatto were open to another season. In March 2017, it was revealed that David Milch had been recruited to assist Pizzolatto in preparing the third season, and that writing the first two episodes had already been completed. In June 2017, The Tracking Board reported that Mahershala Ali was in early discussions with HBO to play the lead role of the season. In July 2017, Bloys told reporters at the press tour of the Television Critics Association that Pizzolatto had written the third season almost in its entirety, and added "When we find a director, we'll be a go on that."

On August 31, 2017, after director Jeremy Saulnier was confirmed to work alongside Pizzolatto, HBO officially greenlit the third season of True Detective. The story was announced to span three decades and take place in the Ozarks, as partner detectives investigate a macabre crime, with Ali in the lead role of state police detective Wayne Hays. Talking about the renewal, Bloys stated: "Nic has written truly remarkable scripts. With his ambitious vision and Mahershala Ali and Jeremy Saulnier aboard, we are excited to embark on the next installment of True Detective." Besides Pizzolatto, who also serves as the season's showrunner, other executive producers of the season include Saulnier, Fukunaga, Scott Stephens, season one stars Woody Harrelson and Matthew McConaughey, along with Steve Golin, Bard Dorros, and Richard Brown.

=== Cast and crew ===
Saulnier was expected to direct the first three episodes of the season. However, in March 2018, after he had completed the first two episodes, Saulnier exited the series due to scheduling conflicts, although several sources reported Saulnier's "differences of opinion" with Pizzolatto. Daniel Sackheim was announced to replace Saulnier, with the veteran director also being added as an executive producer for the season. Sackheim would divide up directing assignments on the remaining episodes with Pizzolatto, who also serves as the sole writer of the season, except for the episodes four and six, which he co-wrote with David Milch and Graham Gordy respectively.

Academy Award-winner Mahershala Ali plays the lead role of state police detective Wayne Hays. In an interview with Variety, Ali revealed that he was originally offered a supporting role, as the main character was supposed to be white, but that he had convinced Pizzolatto that he was suited for the lead. In November 2017, Carmen Ejogo was added to the cast in the role of schoolteacher Amelia Reardon, followed in January 2018 by Stephen Dorff as detective Roland West. Joining them was Ray Fisher as Henry, the son of Wayne Hays. In January 2018, The Agency Inc. issued casting calls for up to 1,500 actors, stand-ins and photo-doubles to begin filming in Northwest Arkansas, with the agency's CEO noting, "This is the largest production we've ever cast." Additional casting calls were issued in June 2018 on Backstage, for Asian talent to portray Vietnamese civilians and soldiers.

=== Filming ===
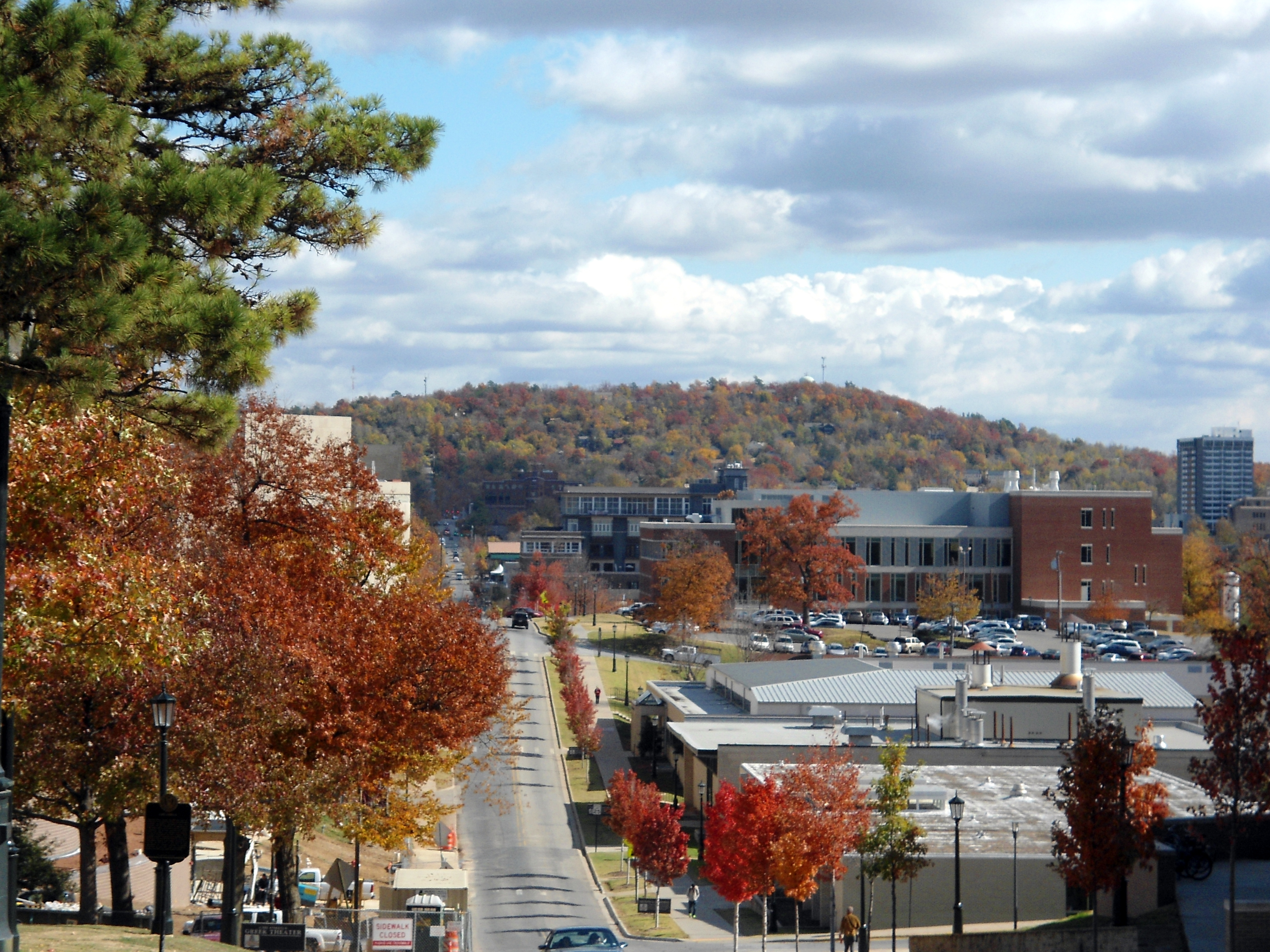
A view of Mount Sequoyah from the campus of the University of Arkansas in Fayetteville.

In February 2018, filming began in Arkansas, with Jeremy Saulnier and Nic Pizzolatto splitting directing assignments. However, when Saulnier exited the production after the first two episodes, it became clear that it would take longer than expected to complete the filming. On March 30, 2018, Variety wrote in regard to Saulnier's departure: "Sources said the filming on location in Arkansas has been tough at times, and that Pizzolatto and Saulnier had differences of opinion on the episodes." Saulnier was replaced by veteran director Daniel Sackheim, who would also divide directing assignments on the remaining six episodes with Pizzolatto.

The season was filmed by Random Productions LLC at various locations throughout Northwest Arkansas, including Fayetteville, Bentonville, Lincoln, Rogers and Springdale. Filming took place mainly in Fayetteville, from Mount Sequoyah to homes, apartments and restaurants around the city. Filming on location also included the use of stunts and pyrotechnics in residential areas, namely car explosions, smoke and loud noises. In regard to production on the series taking place in Arkansas, the director of Arkansas Economic Development Commission had stated in December 2017, "This is the largest and most expensive production we've ever had in the state. With an estimated year from start to finish, we know that local businesses and vendors will enjoy a boon from the production."

The season wrapped filming in Fayetteville in August 2018. Talking about their experience, executive producer Scott Stephens said, "Everything we've needed has been right at our fingertips, from period architecture to abandoned buildings that still evoke the 80s," while lead actor Mahershala Ali added that "[the landscape] is such a character in the story. It would have been such a shame if we had shot it any other place." Pizzolatto, who spent four years of his life in Fayetteville as a student at the University of Arkansas, found the area evocative and powerful, and revealed that it was important for him to shoot the season in Arkansas, as this was the place he had in mind when he was writing the episodes.

== Cast ==
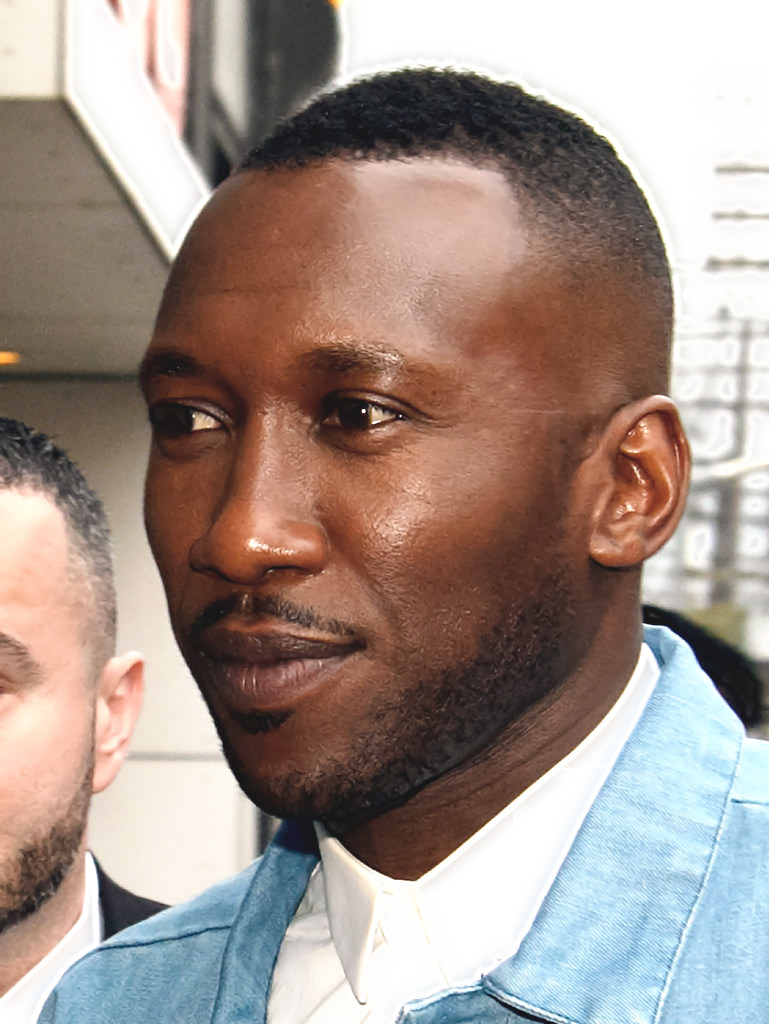
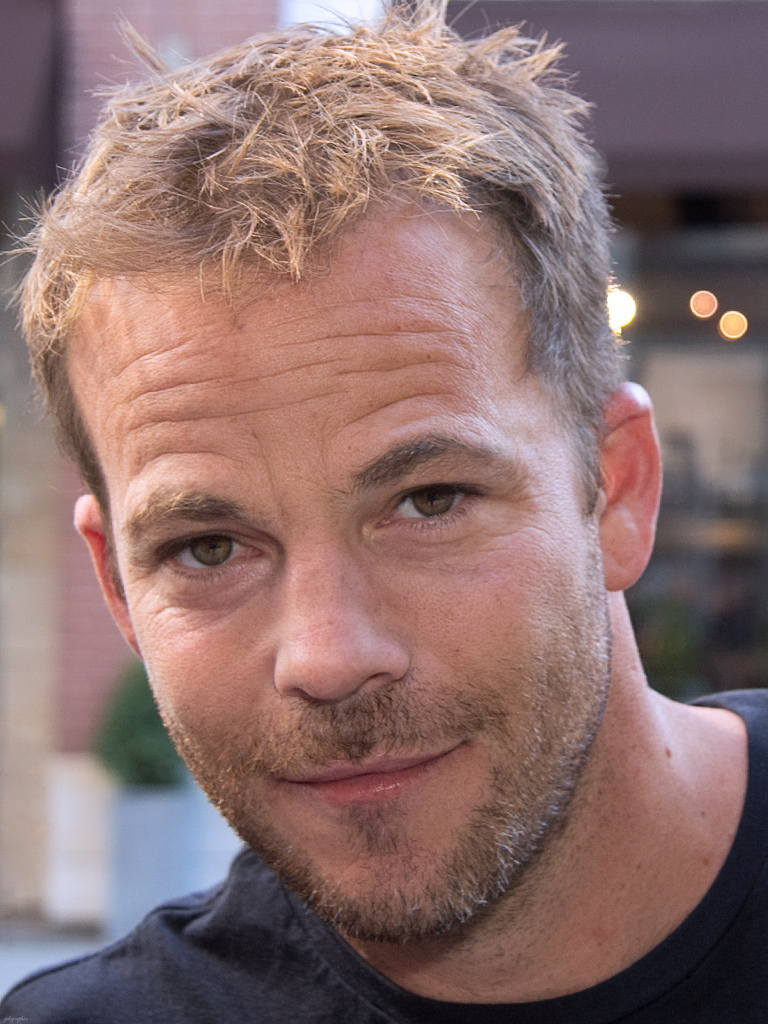
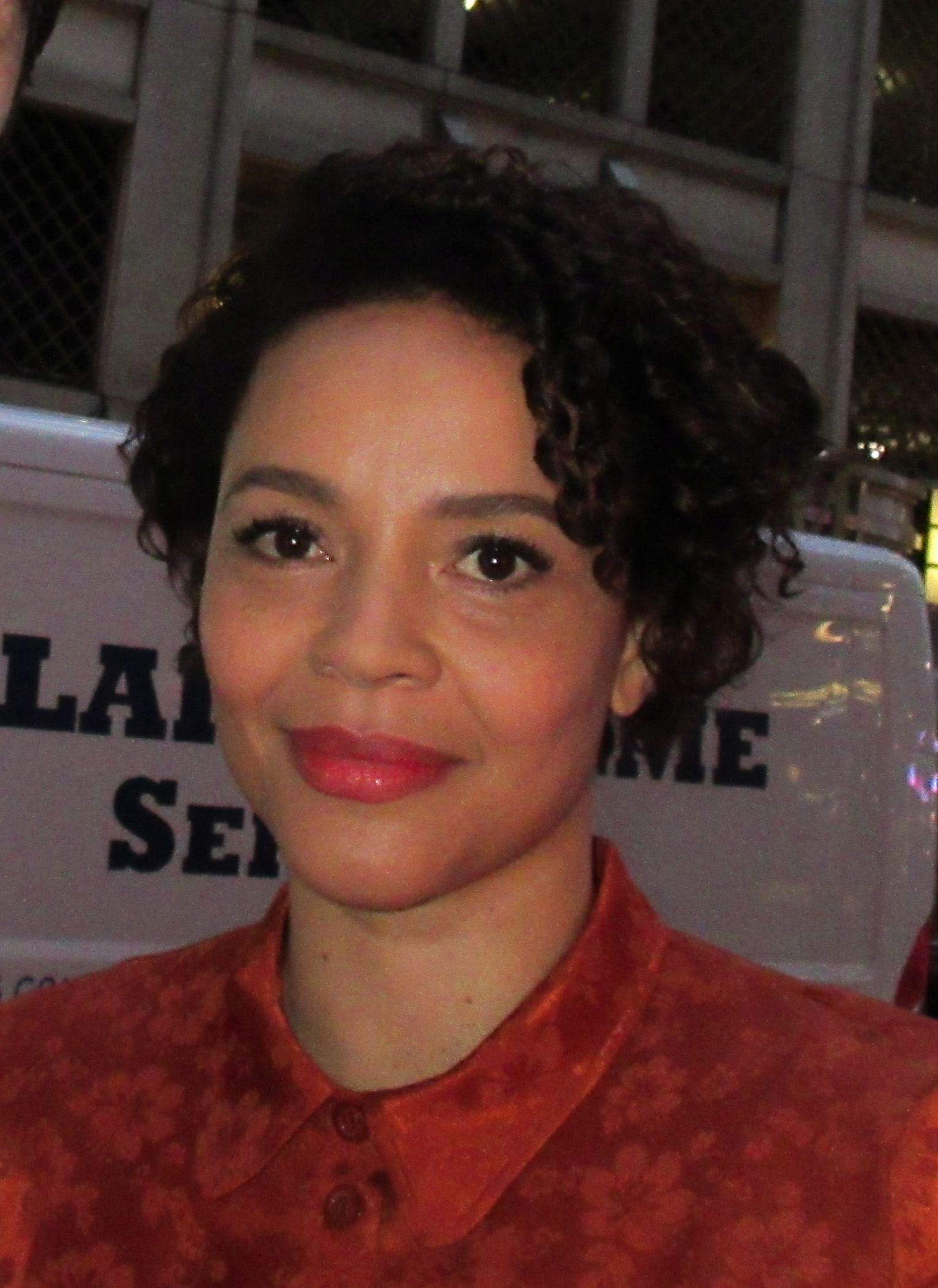
Mahershala Ali (left) plays the lead role in the third season, accompanied by Stephen Dorff (middle) and Carmen Ejogo (right).

=== Main cast ===
- Mahershala Ali as Wayne Hays, a state police detective and a Vietnam War veteran
- Carmen Ejogo as Amelia Reardon, an Arkansas schoolteacher and aspiring writer who eventually marries Wayne Hays
- Stephen Dorff as Roland West, Wayne Hays' partner and later a lieutenant in the state police
- Scoot McNairy as Tom Purcell, a father of two missing children whose fate is tied to those of Wayne Hays and Roland West for over 10 years
- Ray Fisher as Henry Hays, Wayne Hays' and Amelia Reardon's son who has become a detective

=== Recurring cast ===
- Mamie Gummer as Lucy Purcell, Tom Purcell's wife and mother of two missing children
- Josh Hopkins as Jim Dobkins, a private attorney involved in deposing state police detectives in an ongoing investigation
- Jodi Balfour as Lori, the long-term love interest of Roland West
- Deborah Ayorinde as Becca Hays, the estranged daughter of Wayne Hays
- Isaiah C. Morgan as Henry Hays, the son of Wayne Hays at age 9
- Corbin Pitts as Mike Ardoin, friend/classmate of Julie and Will Purcell
- Rhys Wakefield as Freddy Burns, a local teenager caught up in the disappearance
- Michael Greyeyes as Brett Woodard, a Native American trash collector and Vietnam War veteran
- Jon Tenney as Alan Jones, a district attorney who is involved in the case and later assists Dobkins
- Brett Cullen as Gerald Kindt, an ambitious local district attorney and later Arkansas Attorney General
- Sarah Gadon as Elisa Montgomery, a true crime documentary filmmaker
- Emily Nelson as Margaret, a friend of Lucy Purcell
- Brandon Flynn as Ryan Peters, a local teenager caught up in the disappearance
- Michael Graziadei as Dan O'Brien, Lucy Purcell's cousin
- Scott Shepherd as Harris James, a police officer and later Chief of Security at Hoyt Foods
- Michael Rooker as Edward Hoyt, owner of the chicken processing plant Hoyt Foods
- Steven Williams as Junius "Mr. June" Watts, a former employee of Edward Hoyt
- Bea Santos as Julie Purcell, the missing daughter of Tom and Lucy Purcell, in the 1990 and 2015 time periods

== Episodes ==
| No. overall | No. in season | Title | Directed by | Written by | Original release date | U.S. viewers (millions) |
|---|---|---|---|---|---|---|
| 17 | 1 | "The Great War and Modern Memory" | Jeremy Saulnier | Nic Pizzolatto | January 13, 2019 | 1.44 |
The narrative alternates between three time periods: 1980, 1990, and 2015. In 1980, Will and Julie Purcell tell their father they are going to a playground to meet a friend, but do not return. Arkansas State Police Detective Wayne Hays and his partner Roland West organize a search. Hays is a Vietnam veteran who worked as a tracker. The Purcells' parents, Tom and Lucy, do not have a happy marriage. Hays and West search their house and find Playboy magazines under Will's mattress, and a hole in Will's closet looking into Julie's room. They learn that Lucy's cousin had previously stayed in Will's room while Will slept on the couch. Hays meets Will's English teacher, Amelia Reardon. Using his tracking skills, he finds Will's body in a cave, with his fingers interlinked as if in prayer. In 1990, the unsolved case is reopened. Hays is informed that Julie Purcell is still alive; her fingerprints were found in a pharmacy after a burglary. In 2015, Amelia is dead and Hays is being interviewed for a true crime television program.
| 18 | 2 | "Kiss Tomorrow Goodbye" | Jeremy Saulnier | Nic Pizzolatto | January 13, 2019 | 1.19 |
In 1980, Hays and West interview native American Brett Woodard, a local trash salvager and former military veteran, about what he saw on the day of the disappearance as well as what they found when they went into his house, questioning him about his family and background. Tom's parents suggest that Tom might not have been Julie's father. Hays and West try to find the source of some chaff dolls found near Will Purcell's body. A student reports that Julie Purcell was given one while trick-or-treating on Halloween. The Purcells receive an anonymous note telling them not to look for Julie. In 1990, Hays and Amelia are married. Amelia has written a book about the Purcell case.
| 19 | 3 | "The Big Never" | Daniel Sackheim | Nic Pizzolatto | January 20, 2019 | 1.06 |
In 1980, Hays wonders why the Purcell children lied about intending to meet a friend, Ronnie Boyle. They pretended they saw him regularly. Hays and West interview a farmer, who claims he has already spoken to the police. He reports seeing the Purcell children regularly going into the woods. He reports seeing a brown car with a black man and a white woman. Hays and West find the children had a Hoyt Foods bag. Hoyt Foods is a chicken processing plant where Lucy worked. It funds a children's charity which is offering a reward for information about the children's disappearance. A group of locals chase down Woodard in their vehicles and is beaten because they believe he is responsible for the children's disappearance. At the Purcell house, Hays finds a photo album containing a photograph of Will taken at his first communion, with his fingers interlaced and his eyes closed. In 1990, Amelia talks with law enforcement officers to discover more details about Julie Purcell's fingerprints at the pharmacy. West asks Hays to join his reopened investigation into the case. In 2015, Hays has dementia, causing memory loss and hallucinations. He continues being interviewed for the television program. The interviewer, Elisa, asks why the brown sedan was never mentioned in the police report.
| 20 | 4 | "The Hour and the Day" | Nic Pizzolatto | Nic Pizzolatto & David Milch | January 27, 2019 | 1.45 |
In 1980, Hays and West interview the Catholic priest about Will Purcell's communion photograph. The priest takes photos of all first communicants, but Will is the only one who has his eyes closed. The priest tells Hays and West that the Purcell children were excited about seeing an aunt; they respond that the children did not have an aunt. The priest reports that the chaff dolls are made by a female parishioner. She in turn tells them that a black man with a milky eye bought several at a recent fair, saying they were for his nieces and nephews. They find a man matching this description, who is uncooperative. He says he attends the Presbyterian church, not the Catholic one. The priest is unusually keen to hear Hays' confession. The fingerprints of Freddy Burns, a local teenager, are found on Will Purcell's bicycle. Hays and West interrogate him and threaten him with prison rape. Amelia visits Lucy Purcell to give her the children's school projects. Lucy cries "I have done a terrible thing", but becomes angry when Amelia says she can talk in confidence to Wayne Hays. Locals see Brett Woodard talking to children, and chase him to his house, where he sets tripwires and Claymore mines, and distributes rifles around his house. In 1990, Hays finds footage of Julie Purcell from the pharmacy CCTV. West reports that Lucy Purcell died of a drug overdose in 1988 in Las Vegas. In 2015, Elisa shows Hays a photograph of the skeleton of Dan O'Brien, Lucy Purcell's cousin, who went missing around 1987. Hays sees a car outside his house; is someone watching him, or is he hallucinating?
| 21 | 5 | "If You Have Ghosts" | Nic Pizzolatto | Nic Pizzolatto | February 3, 2019 (Note: The fifth episode was released online on HBO's streaming service on February 1, and released on normal broadcast television on February 3, 2019, as a result of having to air opposite Super Bowl LIII.) | 0.88 |
In 1980, the police arrive just as locals attack Brett Woodard's house. Claymore mines go off, killing some of the locals. Woodard shoots locals and policemen. Hays tells Woodard to drop his rifle, but Woodard commits suicide by cop. In 1990, Wayne Hays and Amelia's marriage is suffering because of her book about the Purcell case. After Woodard's death, the disappearance of Will and Julie Purcell was attributed to him. Will Purcell's bookbag was found under Woodard's porch. Hays realizes that it must have been planted there afterwards, because it was undamaged by the Claymore mine explosion. However, West's superiors wanted him to blame Woodard; West cannot show this information to them without them shutting down his task force. Tom Purcell makes a televised appeal for Julie Purcell to come forward. A woman indirectly claiming to be Julie Purcell calls the police hotline, saying that "Julie Purcell" is not her real name, and telling "the man from TV, acting like my father" to leave her alone. She asks "Where's my brother?" Hays and West visit Freddy Burns, who tells them that Will was looking for his sister on the night they went missing. Burns says Will wanted to know where "they" went; Julie was not alone. The fingerprints found on Will and Julie's toys have gone missing from the case file. Hays and West interview someone who recognized Julie Purcell from the CCTV footage. He says she called herself "Mary July", was confused about what year it was, and said she was a "secret princess" from "the pink rooms". In 2015, Elisa tells Hays that one of the officers who processed the Woodard house in 1980, Harris James, went missing in 1990. Hays finally reads Amelia's book. From Amelia's description of her visit to Lucy Purcell, he realizes that Lucy Purcell sent the note in 1980 (episode 2). He again sees a car outside, parked across the street. Hays visits West. West is angry at Hays but Hays does not remember why; he apologizes. West promises to help Hays "stir some shit up" before his condition grows to an extent he is no longer able to function to solve the case.
| 22 | 6 | "Hunters in the Dark" | Daniel Sackheim | Graham Gordy & Nic Pizzolatto | February 10, 2019 | 1.25 |
In 1990, Hays and West search Tom Purcell's house, finding evidence indicating he is a closeted homosexual. They find that Harris James has been working at Hoyt Foods as head of security since May 1981, on a large salary. Hays revisits the abandoned Purcell house, and speculates that the "peep hole" was actually for passing notes. Dan O'Brien contacts Hays and West, asking for money in exchange for information. Tom Purcell overhears other detectives discussing O'Brien, and tracks him down. He beats O'Brien, who says he knows who has been giving Lucy money for the last 10 years, to keep her quiet. Amelia gives a public reading of her finished book in a bookshop. A black man with a milky eye asks her if she knows where Julie is. Later, Tom Purcell breaks into the Hoyt mansion, and is watched by someone on CCTV. He enters the basement, and behind a security door, finds a pink room. Harris James approaches him from behind.
| 23 | 7 | "The Final Country" | Daniel Sackheim | Nic Pizzolatto | February 17, 2019 | 1.32 |
In 1990, Tom Purcell's body is found, staged to look like a suicide. Dan O'Brien has gone missing when Hays and West try to ask him about it. The case is closed. Amelia interviews a friend of Lucy's, who has a photograph of Will and Julie trick-or-treating on Halloween, with the chaff doll. In the background are two adults dressed as ghosts; one black and one white. Amelia discovers that Dan O'Brien met a black man with one eye in a bar that Lucy used to work at. Hays examines Lucy's phone records and finds that she made several calls to Harris James before she died. James then flew to Las Vegas; the implication is that he murdered her. Hays persuades West to confront James, but he attacks them and they shoot him dead. They bury his body; West is angry at Hays. That night, Hays burns his clothes and refuses to tell his wife why. The next day, Edward Hoyt calls Hays, demanding to discuss "the events of last night". Hays gets into Hoyt's car, which drives away. In 2015, Elisa suggests that one or both of the Purcell parents sold their children to a child sex ring, who were able to evade capture through high-level government connections. Elisa says the black man with one eye was called "Watts", and suspects he was a "procurer" for the child sex ring. Hays and West interview a former housekeeper of the Hoyt family, who reveals that Mr. Hoyt had a daughter, "Miss Isabel", who lost her husband and daughter in a car wreck in 1977, and was then involved in one herself. She lived in the basement, and only a black man with one eye, "Mr. June", was allowed to attend to her. Hays confronts the car outside his house. It drives off, but not before West photographs its license plate.
| 24 | 8 | "Now Am Found" | Daniel Sackheim | Nic Pizzolatto | February 24, 2019 | 1.38 |
In 1980, Amelia has written an article criticizing the case's conclusions. Wayne Hays' superiors try to force him to write a statement repudiating her article, but he refuses and is demoted. He tries to break up with Amelia, but then decides to marry her. In 1990, Edward Hoyt threatens Hays, saying he has footage of Harris James' car being followed by Hays' car leaving the Hoyt Foods plant, and a GPS tracker on Harris James. Amelia and Hays argue and he resigns from the Arkansas State Police force. He becomes head of campus security at the University of Arkansas, and Amelia becomes a lecturer at the same university. In 2015, Hays and West break into the abandoned Hoyt house, and find the pink room in the basement. They interview the wife of Harris James, who says she was visited by a black man with one eye, called Junius. They track down Junius Watts, who was in the car outside Hays' house. He admits he was trying to summon the courage to talk to Hays. He explains what happened with the Purcell children. A grief-stricken Isabel Hoyt saw Julie Purcell at a Hoyt Foods company picnic, and, perceiving Julie to have a strong resemblance to her late daughter, wanted to see her again. Watts paid Lucy Purcell to allow Julie to play with Isabel regularly in the woods, under the supervision of Watts and Will Purcell. However, Isabel stopped taking her lithium medication and tried to take Julie. Will tried to stop her and Isabel pushed him causing him to hit his head on a rock. Harris James paid Lucy to allow Isabel to keep Julie. Isabel gave Julie lithium to keep her happy. As Julie grew up, she started asking questions and Watts helped her escape, but she went missing. She supposedly caught HIV while on the road, then stayed at a convent for some years. A woman at the convent shows Hays and West "Mary July"'s gravestone. Later, while reading a passage from Amelia's book, Hays realizes that the convent groundskeeper was a classmate of Julie's before she disappeared, suspecting that the groundskeeper's daughter, Lucy, is Julie's daughter and Julie is alive. Hays drives to their house, but when he arrives he cannot remember why he is there. He finds the daughter with her mother. The family offer Hays water, he recollects as he drinks it. Hays is then picked up by Henry and reunites with Rebecca, who drives him home. Henry keeps a note with the address. Hays relaxes with his family and West, watching his grandchildren ride their bikes and reflecting on his decision in 1980 to start a family of his own.

== Reception ==
=== Critical response ===
True Detective season 3: Critical reception by episode
True Detective season 3 (2019): Percentage of positive critics' reviews tracked by the website Rotten Tomatoes

The third season garnered positive reviews, and was praised as a return to form in comparison to the second season, which had received mixed reviews after the positive reception that the first season had received.

On Rotten Tomatoes, the season has a rating of 84%, based on 110 reviews, with an average rating of 7.65/10. The site's critical consensus reads "Driven by Mahershala Ali's mesmerizing performance, True Detective's third season finds fresh perspective by exploring real-world events – though it loses some of the series' intriguing strangeness along the way." On Metacritic, the season has a score of 72 out of 100, based on 35 critics, indicating "generally favorable" reviews.

=== Accolades ===
| Award | Category | Nominee(s) | Result | Ref. |
|---|---|---|---|---|
| Black Reel Awards for Television | Outstanding TV Movie/Limited Series | True Detective | Nominated | |
| Black Reel Awards for Television | Outstanding Actor, TV Movie/Limited Series | Mahershala Ali | Nominated | |
| Black Reel Awards for Television | Outstanding Supporting Actress, TV Movie/Limited Series | Carmen Ejogo | Nominated | |
| Critics' Choice Television Awards | Best Actor in a Movie/Limited Series | Mahershala Ali | Nominated | |
| Gold Derby TV Awards | Movie/Limited Series Lead Actor | Mahershala Ali | Nominated | |
| Golden Trailer Awards | Best Drama (TV Spot/Trailer/Teaser for a Series) | True Detective | Nominated | |
| Primetime Emmy Awards | Outstanding Lead Actor in a Limited Series or Movie | Mahershala Ali | Nominated | |
| Primetime Creative Arts Emmy Awards | Outstanding Cinematography for a Limited Series or Movie | Germain McMicking (for "The Great War and Modern Memory") | Nominated | |
| Primetime Creative Arts Emmy Awards | Outstanding Hairstyling for a Limited Series or Movie | Brian B. Badie, Andrea Mona Bowman, and Lawrence Cornell Davis | Nominated | |
| Primetime Creative Arts Emmy Awards | Outstanding Main Title Design | Patrick Clair, Nic Pizzolatto, Raoul Marks, Woosung Kang, Kyle Moore, and Victor Joy | Nominated | |
| Primetime Creative Arts Emmy Awards | Outstanding Makeup for a Limited Series or Movie (Non-Prosthetic) | John Blake, Francisco X. Perez, and Debi Young | Nominated | |
| Primetime Creative Arts Emmy Awards | Outstanding Music Composition for a Limited Series, Movie or Special (Original Dramatic Score) | T Bone Burnett and Keefus Ciancia (for "The Final Country") | Nominated | |
| Primetime Creative Arts Emmy Awards | Outstanding Single-Camera Picture Editing for a Limited Series or Movie | Leo Trombetta (for "If You Have Ghosts") | Nominated | |
| Primetime Creative Arts Emmy Awards | Outstanding Sound Editing for a Limited Series, Movie, or Special | Mandell Winter, David Esparza, Micah Loken, Bernard Weiser, Ryan Collins, Fernand Bos, Jason Wormer, Eryne Prine, Sarah Monat, and Robin Harlan (for "The Great War and Modern Memory") | Nominated | |
| Primetime Creative Arts Emmy Awards | Outstanding Sound Mixing for a Limited Series or Movie | Tateum Kohut, Greg Orloff, Geoffrey Patterson, and Biff Dawes (for "The Great War and Modern Memory") | Nominated | |

== Home media ==
The season was released on Blu-ray and DVD on September 3, 2019. In addition to the eight episodes, both formats contain bonus content including the featurettes "Designing the Decades" and "A Conversation with Nic Pizzolatto and T Bone Burnett" as well as deleted scenes and an extended version of the season finale.
