= If You Have Ghosts (True Detective) =

- True Detective episode
- Episode no.: Season 3 Episode 5
- Directed by: Nic Pizzolatto
- Written by: Nic Pizzolatto
- Cinematography by: Nigel Bluck
- Editing by: Leo Trombetta
- Original air dates: February 1, 2019 (online); February 3, 2019 (HBO)
- Running time: 58 minutes

Guest appearances
- Brett Cullen as George Kindt; Jon Tenney as Alan Jones; Sarah Gadon as Elisa Montgomery; Scott Shepherd as Harris James; Michael Greyeyes as Brett Woodard; Brian Oerly as Eddie; Myk Watford as Detective Morelli; David Stanbra as Detective Segar; Bill Kelly as Detective Hobbs; Tim Griffin as Agent Burt Diller; Michael Broderick as Agent John Bowen; L. Warren Young as Detective; Rhys Wakefield as Freddy Burns; Jodi Balfour as Lori; Josh Hopkins as Jim Dobkins; James MacDonald as Major Blevins; Karole Foreman as Amelia's Mother; Bea Santos as 21-Year-Old Julie Purcell; Isaiah C. Morgan as Young Henry Hays; Kennedi Lynn Butler as Young Becca Hays; Elisha Pratt as Woodard Son; Cheyenne Seleah as Woodard Daughter; Mark Pettit as Reporter #1; Brian Gililland as Reporter #2; T.C. Matherne as Logan; Katy Harris as Fran; Gary Newton as Detective; Jeff Bailey as Doctor; Jason Edwards as Evidence Control Officer; Cullen Moss as State Trooper

Episode chronology
← Previous "The Hour and the Day"	Next → "Hunters in the Dark"
- True Detective (season 3)

"If You Have Ghosts" is the fifth episode of the third season of the American anthology crime drama television series True Detective. It is the 21st overall episode of the series and was written and directed by series creator Nic Pizzolatto. It was first broadcast on HBO in the United States on February 3, 2019. The episode was made available on HBO Go on February 1, 2019, as a result of having to air opposite Super Bowl LIII.

The season takes place in the Ozarks over three separate time periods. In 1980, partner detectives Wayne Hays (Mahershala Ali) and Roland West (Stephen Dorff) as they investigate a macabre crime involving two missing children, Will and Julie Purcell. In 1990, Hays is questioned after the case is re-opened after new evidence resurfaces. In 2015, an old Hays with memory problems conducts an interview to discuss the case. In the episode, the massacre at Brett Woodard's house unleashes severe consequences for the cases. In the other time periods, Hays and West continue investigating Julie Purcell's supposed re-appearance.

According to Nielsen Media Research, the episode was seen by an estimated 0.88 million household viewers and gained a 0.2 ratings share among adults aged 18–49. The episode received positive reviews from critics, who praised the performances, character development and ending, although some expressed frustration with the pacing.

== Plot ==
=== 1980 ===
Hays (Mahershala Ali) and West (Stephen Dorff) arrive at Woodard's (Michael Greyeyes) house, as locals have gathered to corner it. A man slams the door open, unaware that a mine was behind it, causing an explosion that kills him and wounds the rest. As Woodard starts shooting at the locals, they try to reach the backyard, with more locals dying after stepping on mines and West getting shot in the leg.

Managing to enter the house, Hays talks with Woodard to try to convince him to surrender. Unwilling to get arrested, Woodard decides to commit suicide by cop, warning Hays that he will shoot him once he turns back at him. When he does, Hays kills him as more authorities arrive at the crime scene.

In the aftermath, Hays is disturbed by the events but other officers show no remorse for what happened. Amelia (Carmen Ejogo) comforts him and takes him to her house, where they have sex.

=== 1990 ===
It is revealed that Woodard's death prompted the authorities to close the case, blaming him for Will's death and Julie's disappearance as Will's bookbag was found at his property. While Hays and West uncover that the bookbag was planted after the shooting, their superiors don't want them to disclose the information.

Tom (Scoot McNairy) makes an appearance for a public hearing, asking Julie to come back, while Kindt (Brett Cullen) uses the opportunity to highlight Woodard's role in the events. Hays and West visit Freddy Burns (Rhys Wakefield), who tells them that Will was looking for his sister on the night they went missing. Burns says Will wanted to know where "they" went, indicating that Julie was not alone. It is also revealed that the fingerprints found on Will and Julie's toys have gone missing from the case file.

Hays and West interview a man who claims to have recognized Julie in the footage. He states that Julie was calling herself "Mary July", was unsure of the year and also claimed to call herself a "secret princess" from "the pink rooms". Later, Hays and Amelia go dining with West and his girlfriend, Lori (Jodi Balfour), where it is clear Hays and Amelia are struggling with their marriage. Back home, Hays confronts her for her focus on the book, accusing her of using everyone around her for her purposes.

Hays and West then bring Tom to the station, showing him a recording depicting a woman claiming to be Julie talking with a police officer. The woman claims not to be called Julie and that Tom is not her father, also questioning where is her brother. The conversation devastates Tom.

=== 2015 ===
During an interview with Elisa (Sarah Gadon), Hays is informed that Harris James (Scott Shepherd), an officer who investigated Woodard's house after the shooting, has been missing since 1990. This prompts him to read Amelia's book, where she cites her encounter with Lucy. (Note: As depicted in "The Hour and the Day".) Remembering the letter that was sent to the Purcells, Hays finally connects that Lucy was the one who sent the letter. During this, he is once again disturbed by the sight of a car parked across the street, seemingly watching him.

Needing help, Hays visits West, who now lives alone with his dogs. They had a fight years ago and while Hays can't remember what happened, he apologizes for whatever it was, despite how angry West was for that. Seeing Hays' determination in closing the case, West accepts in helping him before his condition worsens.

== Production ==
=== Development ===
In January 2019, the episode's title was revealed as "If You Have Ghosts" and it was announced that series creator Nic Pizzolatto had written and directed the episode. This was Pizzolatto's twenty-first writing credit, and Pizzolatto's second directing credit.

== Reception ==
=== Viewers ===
The episode was watched by 0.88 million viewers, earning a 0.2 in the 18-49 rating demographics on the Nielson ratings scale. This means that 0.2 percent of all households with televisions watched the episode. This was a 40% decrease from the previous episode, which was watched by 1.45 million viewers with a 0.4 in the 18-49 demographics.

=== Critical reviews ===
"If You Have Ghosts" received positive reviews from critics. The review aggregator website Rotten Tomatoes reported a 92% approval rating for the episode, based on 12 reviews, with an average rating of 6.75/10. The site's consensus states: "Mahershala Ali and Stephen Dorff's ingratiating chemistry is given the spotlight during a well-rounded True Detective installment that is by turns beguiling, stomach-turning, but never dull."

Emily L. Stephens of The A.V. Club gave the episode a "B" grade and wrote, "In 'If You Have Ghosts', True Detective loses sight of its core mystery: What is happening inside the head of Wayne Hays, a gifted detective and a compelling persuader, as he tries to remember what he’s done and who he has been."

Sean T. Collins of Rolling Stone wrote, "Time may or may not be a flat circle, but the success rate of Wayne Hays and Roland West sure is. This week's True Detective comes straight from series creator Nic Pizzolatto, who shows our heroes working together diligently to solve the mystery of Will Purcell's murder and Julie Purcell's disappearance. In fact, these partners try to tackle the case in three different decades... and find themselves in dead ends each time." Lanre Bakare of The Guardian wrote, "There's a long-awaited reunion and some intriguing callbacks to season one as the detective drama finds its groove." Ben Travers of IndieWire gave the episode an "A−" grade and wrote, "Season 3 makes it clear PIzzolatto wasn't a flash-in-the-pan success. He can and should keep writing for television. It’s not that he needs to step away from the franchise, either; it’s that he needs to let it grow to its full potential."

Derek Lawrence of Entertainment Weekly wrote, "We're now into the second half of True Detective's eight-episode third season, and while 'If You Have Ghosts' provided more questions than answers, the episode was worth the ride based solely on the final 10-plus minutes, which reunited Roland and Wayne in 2015." Amy Glynn of Paste gave the episode an 8.8 out of 10 and wrote, "Time might or might not be a flat circle. What's 100% clear is that it's a bitch."

Keith Phipps of Vulture gave the episode a 2 star rating out of 5 and wrote, "There comes a point in every season of a television series attempting to tell one long, sustained story when it becomes obvious whether the show has a story that needs a certain number of episodes to be told, or whether those running it are trying to stretch a story that could be told much more swiftly over a set number of episodes. [...] Unfortunately, we seem to have reached it with 'If You Have Ghosts',' the fifth episode of True Detective's third season, which parcels out little bits of narrative between moments of character development that either don't work as well as they should or repeat moments we've already seen. The bits that don't feel clumsy stir a sense of déjà vu." Tony Sokol of Den of Geek gave the episode a perfect 5 star rating out of 5 and wrote, "True Detective's 'If You Have Ghosts' may be the most well rounded of the season's episodes. It is at turns heartbreaking and heart-stopping. It plows some very deep pain, but closes with the biggest shot of hope the series has yet offered. We know it won't last long. That's too bad for the characters, but great for the audience." Scott Tobias of The New York Times wrote, "After last week's booze-soaked wallow in the creator Nic Pizzolatto's worst instincts, it felt great to see True Detective move forward on the case again, even with the occasional hitch in its step."
