= Nic Pizzolatto =

American writer, director, and producer (born 1975)

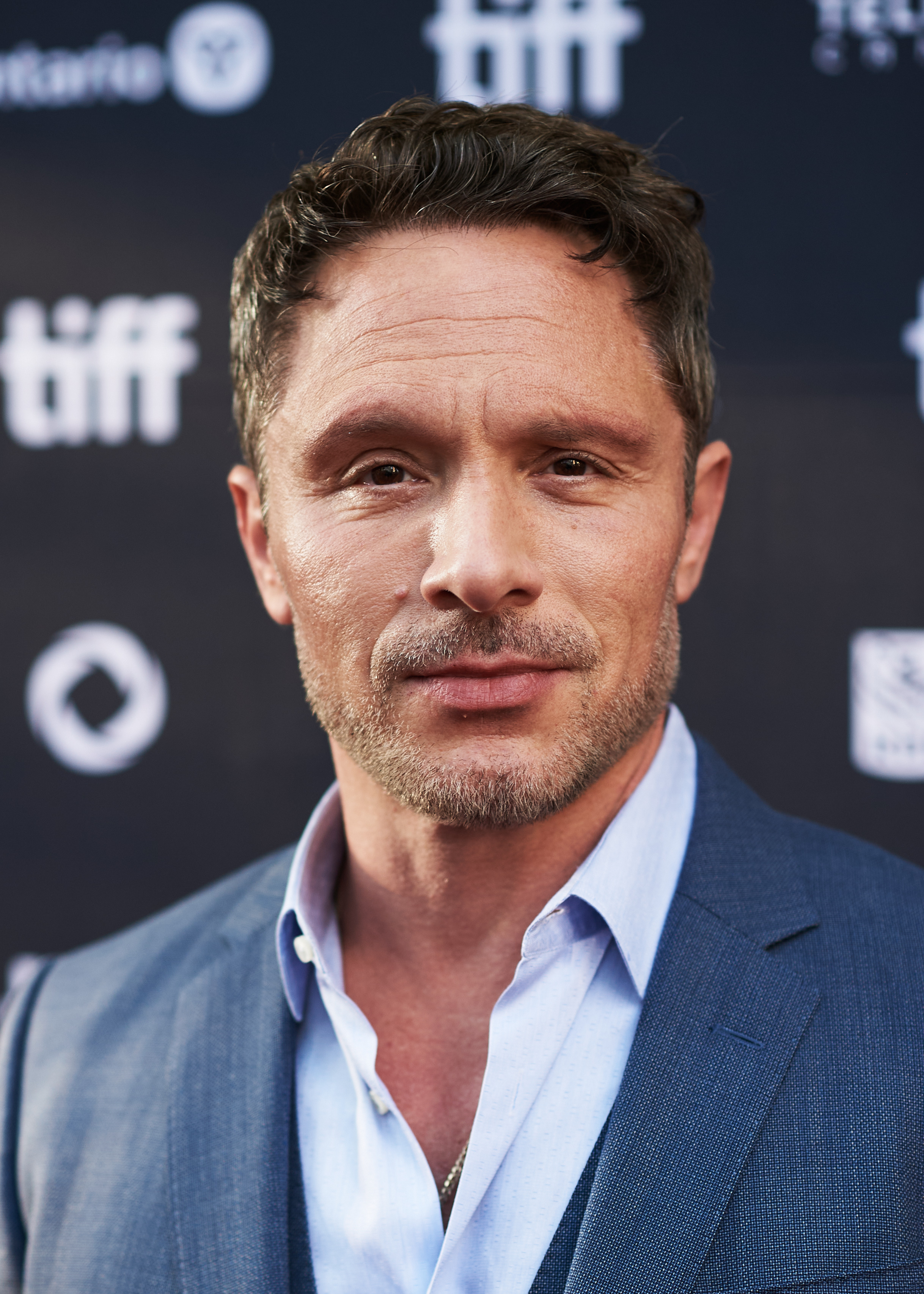
- Nic Pizzolatto at TIFF 2025
- Born: Nicholas Austin Pizzolatto; October 18, 1975 (age 51); New Orleans, Louisiana, U.S.
- Other name: Jim Hammett
- Education: Louisiana State University (BA), University of Arkansas (MFA)
- Occupations: Author; screenwriter; producer
- Years active: 2004–present
- Spouse: Suzanne Santo (m. 2022)
- Children: 2

Nicholas Austin Pizzolatto (born October 18, 1975) is an American author, screenwriter, director, and producer. He is best known for creating the HBO crime drama series True Detective (2014–present).

== Early life and education ==
Nicholas Austin Pizzolatto was born in New Orleans on October 18, 1975. He grew up in a Catholic family of Italian-Americans. His father, Nic Pizzolatto Jr., was an attorney. At the age of five, he moved with his family to a rural area of Lake Charles, Louisiana. He graduated from St. Louis Catholic High School in 1993 and left home when he was 17. He attended Louisiana State University on a visual arts scholarship, graduating with a BA in English and philosophy. He gave up writing following the death of a writing mentor and moved to Austin, Texas, where he worked as a bartender and technical writer for four years. He later enrolled in an MFA program in Creative Writing at the University of Arkansas, and received the Lily Peter Fellowship for poetry and Walton Fellowship in 2003. He graduated in 2005.

== Career ==
=== Novels and short stories ===
Pizzolatto wrote two short stories when he was completing his MFA at the University of Arkansas – "Ghost-Birds" and "Between Here and the Yellow Sea" – which were sold to The Atlantic Monthly. In 2004, his work was among the finalists for the National Magazine Award in Fiction. His collection of short fiction Between Here and the Yellow Sea was long-listed for the 2006 Frank O'Connor International Short Story Award and was also named one of the top five fiction debuts of the year by Poets & Writers Magazine. He also received an honorable mention from the Pushcart Prize, and his short story "Wanted Man" is included in Best American Mystery Stories 2009.

Pizzolatto's first novel, Galveston, was published by Scribner's in June 2010. It was translated into many languages. In 2005, Pizzolatto was named one of Poets & Writers magazine's best new writers. In 2010, Galveston earned him the Prix du Premier Roman Étranger, the French Academy's award for Best First Novel, Foreign. It was also a 2010 Edgar Award finalist for best first novel. Galveston also won third prize in the 2010 Barnes and Noble Discovery Award, and additionally won the 2011 Spur Award for Best First Novel from the Western Writers of America.

=== Film and television ===
In 2011, Pizzolatto wrote two episodes for the first season of the crime drama television series The Killing. He was dissatisfied by the dynamic between the showrunner and the writers of the show and remarked, "I want to be the guiding vision. I don't do well serving someone else's vision." He decided to leave the show after spending two weeks in the writers room on the show's second season.

In 2012, Pizzolatto created an original television series called True Detective, which was sold to HBO and completed shooting in June 2013 with him as executive producer, sole writer, and showrunner. It premiered in January 2014, and became the most watched freshman show in the network's history. The show was critically acclaimed and was so popular the finale crashed HBO's HBO Go streaming service. Pizzolatto listed several influences on the show's first season: philosophy books such as Thomas Ligotti's The Conspiracy Against the Human Race, Eugene Thacker's In The Dust of This Planet, Ray Brassier's Nihil Unbound, Jim Crawford's Confessions of an Antinatalist, and David Benatar's Better Never to Have Been. Pizzolatto also mentions horror authors Laird Barron, John Langan, Simon Strantzas, and Ligotti. In August 2014, he was accused of plagiarizing the aforementioned sources.

A new season of True Detective premiered on June 21, 2015, with Pizzolatto again writing/co-writing all the episodes. In late 2015, it was announced that Pizzolatto had signed a new deal with HBO through 2018.

In August 2016, HBO announced a potential new series written by Pizzolatto and starring Robert Downey Jr., centering on the character of investigative attorney Perry Mason. On August 25, 2017, it was announced that Pizzolatto had dropped out of the production in order to focus on the third season of True Detective and that he was being replaced as the project's writer by Rolin Jones and Ron Fitzgerald. Along with Richard Wenk, Pizzolatto co-wrote the screenplay for The Magnificent Seven (2016), a remake of the period-piece western The Magnificent Seven (1960) (which was itself a western remake of Akira Kurosawa's 1954 film Seven Samurai). Antoine Fuqua directed, and the film, released on September 23, 2016, starred Denzel Washington, Chris Pratt, Vincent D'Onofrio, Lee Byung-hun, Ethan Hawke, Peter Sarsgaard and others.

Pizzolatto adapted his 2010 novel Galveston for the 2018 film of the same name; however, he requested to be credited under the pseudonym Jim Hammett following director Mélanie Laurent's contributions to the screenplay, despite not being formally engaged as a writer on the project, feeling the final script did not reflect his own. Producer Tyler Davidson confirmed the news to Entertainment Weekly, saying, "My personal opinion is that Nic did not feel the final script reflected his work as the sole credited writer, and his representatives advised us to credit him with his pseudonym." In December 2018, Pizzolatto revealed that he had assisted Deadwood creator David Milch in writing the screenplay for the film adaptation. In return, Milch helped him with the third season of True Detective by co-writing the fourth episode as well as giving Pizzolatto advice on crafting the season.

In April 2019, it was announced that Pizzolatto had written the screenplay for the film Ghost Army for Universal Pictures. The film was to be headlined and directed by Ben Affleck. In January 2020, FX announced that Pizzolatto had signed an overall deal with the network, with the first project being the drama series Redeemer. The following year, negotiations for an early termination of the deal were underway after the development of Redeemer was canceled. In April 2020, Pizzolatto said he was interested in writing a Batman film, saying: "Batman is the only character in the world I didn't create that I want a shot at. And he's the only piece of geek culture I have any affinity for."

In March 2022, HBO announced that a fourth season of True Detective entered development, which would carry the subtitle Night Country, a first for the series. The first episode would be written by Issa López, who would also direct it. López would executive produce the season, alongside Barry Jenkins, Adele Romanski and Mark Ceryak. In June 2022, HBO officially greenlit the season, with López serving as showrunner. Pizzolatto would remain as an executive producer, marking his first season without a writing credit. In March 2023, it was reported that Pizzolatto would be writing a Western series for Prime Video. Pizzolatto has said that the series "may be the most purely fun story I've ever written". The previous year he had said that "The Grass Rifles is an original western TV series I've written two episodes of, along with a season-long outline. It's the most populist, funniest thing I've ever written. Also the most romantic..." A month later, it was announced the series was being "refashioned" into a television series adaptation of the 1960 film The Magnificent Seven. In April 2023, Pizzolatto was hired to co-write the script for the Marvel Cinematic Universe film Blade.

=== Other work ===
Pizzolatto taught fiction and literature as Kenan Visiting Writer (2005–2006) at University of North Carolina at Chapel Hill, in 2008 at the University of Chicago, and as assistant professor of English (2008–2012) at DePauw University. He moved to California to pursue a screenwriting career in 2010.

== Personal life ==
Pizzolatto lives with his two daughters in Austin, Texas. He married musician Suzanne Santo in June 2022.

== Works ==
=== Film ===
Year	Title	Director	Writer	Notes
2016	The Magnificent Seven	No	Yes	
2018	Galveston	No	Yes	Credited as Jim Hammett
2019	Deadwood: The Movie	No	Uncredited	
2021	The Guilty	No	Yes	
2025	Easy's Waltz	Yes	Yes	

=== Television ===
==== Writer ====
Year	Show	Season	Episode	Episode number	Original airdate	Notes
2011	The Killing	1	"What You Have Left"	6	May 1, 2011	
2011	The Killing	1	"Orpheus Descending"	14	June 19, 2011	Written by Pizzolatto & Veena Sud
2014	True Detective	1	"The Long Bright Dark"	1	January 12, 2014	
2014	True Detective	1	"Seeing Things"	2	January 19, 2014	
2014	True Detective	1	"The Locked Room"	3	January 26, 2014	
2014	True Detective	1	"Who Goes There"	4	February 9, 2014	Writer and actor
2014	True Detective	1	"The Secret Fate of All Life"	5	February 16, 2014	
2014	True Detective	1	"Haunted Houses"	6	February 23, 2014	
2014	True Detective	1	"After You've Gone"	7	March 2, 2014	
2014	True Detective	1	"Form and Void"	8	March 9, 2014	
2015	True Detective	2	"The Western Book of the Dead"	9	June 21, 2015	
2015	True Detective	2	"Night Finds You"	10	June 28, 2015	
2015	True Detective	2	"Maybe Tomorrow"	11	July 5, 2015	
2015	True Detective	2	"Down Will Come"	12	July 12, 2015	Written by Pizzolatto & Scott Lasser
2015	True Detective	2	"Other Lives"	13	July 19, 2015	
2015	True Detective	2	"Church in Ruins"	14	July 26, 2015	Written by Pizzolatto & Scott Lasser
2015	True Detective	2	"Black Maps and Motel Rooms"	15	August 2, 2015	
2015	True Detective	2	"Omega Station"	16	August 9, 2015	
2019	True Detective	3	"The Great War and Modern Memory"	17	January 13, 2019	
2019	True Detective	3	"Kiss Tomorrow Goodbye"	18	January 13, 2019	
2019	True Detective	3	"The Big Never"	19	January 20, 2019	
2019	True Detective	3	"The Hour and the Day"	20	January 27, 2019	Written by Pizzolatto & David Milch; also director
2019	True Detective	3	"If You Have Ghosts"	21	February 3, 2019	Writer and director
2019	True Detective	3	"Hunters in the Dark"	22	February 10, 2019	Written by Pizzolatto & Graham Gordy
2019	True Detective	3	"The Final Country"	23	February 17, 2019	
2019	True Detective	3	"Now Am Found"	24	February 24, 2019	

=== Bibliography ===
- Pizzolatto, Nic. 2003. "Ghost-Birds" The Atlantic Monthly October 2003 issue. (short story).
- Pizzolatto, Nic. 2004. "Between Here and The Yellow Sea" The Atlantic Monthly November 2004 issue. (short story).
- Pizzolatto, Nic. 2004. "1987, The Races". The Missouri Review. 27, no. 1: 83–93. (short story)
- Pizzolatto, Nic. 2005. "Haunted Earth". The Iowa Review. 35, no. 2: 14–24. (short story)
- Pizzolatto, Nic. Between Here and the Yellow Sea: Stories. San Francisco, CA: MacAdam/Cage, 2005. ISBN 978-1-59692-168-9 (a collection of 9 short stories)
- Pizzolatto, Nic. 2009. "Graves of Light". Ploughshares. 35, no. 4: 140–156. (short story)
- Pizzolatto, Nic. Galveston: A Novel. New York: Scribner, 2010. ISBN 978-1-4391-6664-2

== Accolades ==
The first two short stories Pizzolatto submitted sold simultaneously to The Atlantic. His collection of short fiction Between Here and the Yellow Sea was long-listed for the 2006 Frank O'Connor International Short Story Award and named one of the top five fiction debuts of the year by Poets & Writers Magazine.

Pizzolatto was a finalist for the National Magazine Award for Fiction in 2004. His novel Galveston won third prize in the 2010 Barnes and Noble Discovery Award, and was a finalist for the 2010 Edgar Award for best first novel. It won the 2011 Spur Award for Best First Novel from the Western Writers of America. In France, Galveston was awarded the Prix du Premier Roman étranger (Best Foreign First Novel) for 2011, by a jury of literary critics. In 2015 it won Best Translated Crime Novel by the Swedish Crime Writers Academy. In the Netherlands Galveston won the 2016 De VN Thriller Award.

At the 66th Primetime Emmy Awards, Pizzolatto was nominated for Outstanding Writing for a Drama Series for "The Secret Fate of All Life". At the 67th Writers Guild of America Awards, Pizzolatto and the series won for Best Dramatic Series and Best New Series. In 2015, Pizzolatto was nominated for the Producers Guild of America Award for Best Long-Form Television for True Detective. In 2015, British GQ named Pizzolatto Writer of the Year. Pizzolatto and True Detective won the 2015 British Academy Television Award for Best International Programme.
