= Wayne Hays (True Detective) =

- True Detective character
- First appearance: "The Great War and Modern Memory" (2019)
- Last appearance: "Now Am Found" (2019)
- Created by: Nic Pizzolatto
- Portrayed by: Mahershala Ali

In-universe information
- Full name: Wayne David Hays
- Nickname: Purple Hays
- Gender: Male
- Occupation: Police officer Detective
- Affiliation: United States Army (1960s); Arkansas State Police (1968–1990)
- Spouse: Amelia Hays
- Children: Rebecca Hays (daughter); Henry Hays (son)
- Nationality: American

Wayne David Hays is a fictional character in the third season of the anthology crime drama television series True Detective on HBO. The character was created by series creator Nic Pizzolatto and is portrayed by Mahershala Ali. Hays was originally slated to be portrayed by a white actor while Ali was ready to play a supporting role.

Ali was praised for his performance for which he received a nomination for the Primetime Emmy Award for Outstanding Lead Actor in a Limited Series or Movie.

== Character overview ==
Hays is an African American man born into a poor family. He grew up in Conway, Arkansas. As a child, Hays had dyslexia and later in life confessed that he is not an avid reader because of that experience besides reading some Batman and Silver Surfer comics. He served in the United States Army, completing two tours in the Vietnam War as a member of a long-range reconnaissance patrol (LRRP) team in the 75th Infantry Regiment. As a result, he is an able pathfinder and actively uses these skills while working as an Arkansas State Police detective.

In 1980, he and his partner Roland West (Stephen Dorff) are assigned a missing persons case involving the disappearance of two children. During the investigation, he meets Amelia Reardon (Carmen Ejogo), a schoolteacher who had the missing children in her class. They eventually marry and have two children together: son Henry (Ray Fisher) and daughter Rebecca (Deborah Ayorinde), who later estranges herself from the family. In 1990, Amelia writes Life and Death and the Harvest Moon, a successful book about the missing children case Hays was investigating when they met. She is deceased as of 2015.

Hays is a peaceful, calm man tending to play a role of a good cop, while West, who is also a Vietnam veteran, is more aggressive and quicker to resort to violence. They take the case so personally that they violate the law themselves and in the process kill a suspect. They then part ways and do not see each other for some 10 years before meeting again in 1990 to restart the investigation. In his senior years, Hays suffers from partial memory loss, even though his doctor says that he is physically well and shows no signs of Alzheimer's or dementia. Nevertheless, Hays hallucinates, sometimes seeing ghosts from his past, and has to use a recorder to fix the events and discover new facts during the interviewing.

Early in the season, Hays confesses that the case split his life in two parts—before the case and after it; even though he had previously considered the Vietnam war to be the main event in his life. He thinks about the case all the time, long after the authorities exhausted all lines of investigation and had to close it.

== Character arc ==
Hays' character arc takes place in the Ozarks over three periods of time. In 1980, he and West investigate a macabre crime involving two missing children, Will and Julie Purcell. In 1990, Hays and West are subpoenaed after a major break in the case. In 2015, a retired Hays is asked by a true crime documentary producer to look back at the unsolved case. The filmmaker, Elisa Montgomery (Sarah Gadon), believes the children were kidnapped and murdered by a pedophile ring, similar to a Louisiana case resolved in 2012.

In 1980, Hays and West find Will dead in a cave, and come to suspect a local Native American man named Brett Woodard (Michael Greyeyes), who is also a Vietnam veteran struggling to cope with civilian life. When Woodard gets involved in an armed standoff with his suspicious neighbors, Hays tries to get him to surrender peacefully, but Woodard commits suicide by cop by pulling a gun on Hays, who kills him. Woodard is blamed for the children's supposed death, and the case is closed. Amelia writes an article criticizing the case's conclusions. Hays' superiors try to force him to write a statement repudiating her article, but he refuses and is demoted. He tries to break up with Amelia, but then decides to marry her.

In 1990, Amelia writes a book about the case, which puts a strain on her and Hays' marriage; he believes she is trying to capitalize on the Purcell family's pain, while she thinks he is trying to control her. The case is reopened when Julie's fingerprints are discovered after a store robbery in Sallisaw, Oklahoma, and a woman believed to be Julie is seen on surveillance tape. The children's father Tom Purcell (Scoot McNairy) makes a plea on TV for his daughter to return home, and a short time later, a woman claiming to be Julie calls the police, asking them to stop looking for her. Hays and West are assigned the case, making Hays a homicide detective again.

They suspect Harris James (Scott Shepherd), a former police officer who made several calls to Lucy before she died; they believe James sexually abused and murdered Will, and killed Lucy when she discovered what he had done. Hays and West try to arrest Harris, but he attacks them, forcing West to shoot him dead. They bury the body and tamper with evidence to make it look like Harris left town. West resents Hays for putting him in a position that led to him killing someone, ending their partnership and friendship. The next day, Edward Hoyt (Michael Rooker), owner of supermarket chain Hoyt Foods, blackmails Hays into dropping the case with pictures of Hays following Harris the night of his disappearance. Hays then resigns from the police force.

In 2015, Hays is a widower, Amelia having died a few years earlier, and suffering from worsening memory loss. After talking to Montgomery, Hays contacts West for the first time in 25 years to help him solve the case once and for all, before he loses his cognitive faculties completely. They interview a former housekeeper of the Hoyt family, who reveals that Edward Hoyt had a daughter, Isabel, who lost her husband and daughter in a car wreck in 1977, and was then involved in one herself. She lived in the basement, and only a black man with one eye, "Mr. June", was allowed to attend to her.

They track down Junius Watts (Steven Williams), Isabel's former caretaker, who explains what happened with the Purcell children. A grief-stricken Isabel Hoyt saw Julie at a Hoyt Foods company picnic, and convinced herself that the girl was her daughter. Watts paid Lucy Purcell to allow Julie to play with Isabel regularly in the woods, under the supervision of Watts and Will. However, Isabel stopped taking her lithium and tried to take Julie. Will tried to stop her and hit his head on a rock, killing him. Harris James paid Lucy to allow Isabel to keep Julie, and Isabel gave Julie lithium to keep her happy. When Julie was a teenager, Watts helped her escape, but she went missing. She contracted HIV while on the road, and then stayed at a convent until she died of AIDS. A woman at the convent shows Hays and West "Mary July"'s gravestone.

Later, while reading a passage from Amelia's book, Hays realizes that the convent groundskeeper was a classmate of Julie's before she disappeared, suspecting that his daughter, Lucy, is Julie's child and that Julie is alive. Hays drives to their house, but when he arrives he cannot remember why he is there. While briefly remembering who she is, Hays elects to forget again, and calls his son to take him home. Julie (Bea Santos) takes pity on Hays and offers him water.
