= Daniel Sackheim =

American director (born 1962)

- Born: 1962 (age 63–64); Los Angeles, United States
- Occupations: Film director, television producer, television director
- Years active: 1984–present
- Spouse: Leslie Sackheim
- Children: 2
- Parent(s): William Sackheim; JoAnne Cohen Sackheim
- Website: danielsackheim.com

Daniel Sackheim (born in 1962) is an American television and film director, producer, and photographer. Sackheim has produced and directed for The X-Files, Law & Order, House and NYPD Blue. He has also directed episodes of The Walking Dead, Game of Thrones, The Americans, Better Call Saul, True Detective and Ozark, for which he was nominated for an Emmy Award. He has won a Primetime Emmy Award as a director and been nominated twice for his work as a producer and director.

== Life and career ==
Daniel Sackheim was born to a Jewish family in Los Angeles, the son of screenwriter William Sackheim and his wife JoAnne (née Cohen). His brother Drew Sackheim is a fashion photographer. He is married to Leslie Sackheim; they have two children, Josh and Emma, and live in Encino, California.

Sackheim's career began with a role as an assistant film editor on the 1984 John Cassavetes film Love Streams, before he found work as a music supervisor and associate producer on the NBC series Miami Vice.

Sackheim's first time as a director was on "Mushrooms", a 1991 episode from the premiere season of the television series Law & Order. Sackheim later went on to produce the pilot episode of The X-Files and direct the pilot episode of Harsh Realm. Sackheim also served as an executive producer for the 2005 series Night Stalker, a remake of the 1970s series Kolchak: The Night Stalker; and again as executive producer for the 2012 series The Finder. Sackheim directed the pilot episode of NBC's Hawaii and the television films Homeland Security and The Lottery. Sackheim made his feature film directing debut on 2001's The Glass House. In 1999, he signed an overall deal with 20th Century Fox Television.

From 2010 Sackheim has directed a number of episodes of high rating AMC series The Walking Dead, and since 2013 has also worked as a producer on the FX series The Americans which was listed in the American Film Institute Awards 2013 best ten television programs of the year; as well as serving as executive producer for the 2012 series The Finder. He has also directed three episodes of Jack Ryan.

On July 21, 2020, he and producer Tony To founded Bedrock Entertainment with ITV Studios America as partner.

== Awards ==
Sackheim's work has earned him one Primetime Emmy Award and three additional Emmy nominations. In 1994, Sackheim won the Primetime Emmy Award for Outstanding Directing for a Drama Series, having been nominated for his work on the NYPD Blue episode "Tempest in a C-Cup". His three other nominations have both been for Outstanding Drama Series in the role of producer—for Law & Order in 1992, and for House in 2007. and outstanding directing for Ozark in 2018.

== Filmography ==
=== Film ===
Director

- The Glass House (2001)

Producer

- The X-Files (1998)
- Baby (2010) (uncredited)

=== Television ===
Title	Director	Producer	Notes
Alfred Hitchcock Presents	No	Yes	
Miami Vice	No	Yes	
Law & Order	No	Yes	
ER	Yes	No	1 episode
Earth 2	Yes	No	1 episode
NYPD Blue	Yes	No	3 episodes
Millennium	Yes	Yes	1 episode
The X-Files	Yes	Yes	5 episodes
Harsh Realm	Yes	Yes	3 episodes
Judging Amy	Yes	Yes	3 episodes
Kingpin	Yes	Yes	2 episodes
The Lyon's Den	Yes	Yes	1 episode
Hawaii	Yes	No	1 episode
Las Vegas	Yes	Yes	1 episode
Law & Order: Special Victims Unit	Yes	No	1 episode
Night Stalker	Yes	Yes	2 episodes
House	Yes	Yes	7 episodes
Life	Yes	Yes	7 episodes
Lie to Me	Yes	Yes	6 episodes
Bones	Yes	No	1 episode
The Finder	Yes	Yes	2 episodes
The Walking Dead	Yes	No	3 episodes
The Americans	Yes	Yes	7 episodes
The Bridge	Yes	No	1 episode
The Leftovers	Yes	No	2 episodes
Battle Creek	Yes	No	1 episode
Game of Thrones	Yes	No	2 episodes
The Man in the High Castle	Yes	No	1 episode
Fear the Walking Dead	Yes	No	1 episode
Better Call Saul	Yes	No	2 episodes
Ozark	Yes	No	2 episodes
Jack Ryan	Yes	Yes	3 episodes
The First	Yes	No	2 episodes
True Detective	Yes	Yes	4 episodes
Servant	Yes	No	2 episodes
Lovecraft Country	Yes	Yes	2 episodes
The Audacity	Yes	No	2 episodes
Maximum Pleasure Guaranteed	Yes	No	2 episodes

TV movies

- Midnight Run for Your Life (1994)
- In the Shadow of Evil (1995)
- Grand Avenue (1996)
- The Lottery (1996)
- Homeland Security (2004) (Also co-executive producer)
