= Ray Fisher (actor) =

American actor (born 1987)

- Fisher attending the Being Heumann premiere at TIFF 2026
- Born: September 8, 1987 (age 39); Baltimore, Maryland, U.S.
- Education: American Musical and Dramatic Academy
- Occupation: Actor
- Years active: 2007–present

Ray Fisher (born September 8, 1987) is an American actor. He is known for his portrayal of the superhero Victor Stone/Cyborg in the DC Extended Universe media franchise, including in Justice League (2017). In television, he played roles in the third season of the crime drama series True Detective in 2019 and the limited series Women of the Movement in 2022. He made his Broadway debut in the 2022 revival of the play The Piano Lesson and has also starred in its 2024 film adaptation.

== Early life and education ==
Fisher was born on September 8, 1987, in Baltimore, Maryland. He grew up in Lawnside, New Jersey, where he was raised by his mother and grandmother. Fisher attended Haddon Heights High School. He worked at the concession stand of the Cinemark theater in Somerdale during this time. Fisher became involved in musical theatre through his high school English and history teachers. His first stage performances were in productions of the musicals Into the Woods, How to Succeed in Business Without Really Trying, and Guys and Dolls. Fisher attended the American Musical and Dramatic Academy.

== Career ==
In 2008, Fisher portrayed Dr. Marcus Blake in the musical Attorney for the Damned, which held performances at the off-off-Broadway Kraine Theater. The following year, he acted in William Shakespeare's play Macbeth at the Shakespeare Theatre of New Jersey in Madison, New Jersey at Drew University. Fisher played a minor role in the 2010 McCarter Theatre Center production of Will Power's play Fetch Clay, Make Man. He performed as part of the Shakespeare Theatre of New Jersey, where he starred in a production of the play To Kill a Mockingbird. He also performed in the Oregon Shakespeare Festival's productions of the plays King Lear and Cymbeline. Fisher portrayed boxer Muhammad Ali in the 2013 off-Broadway production of the play Fetch Clay, Make Man at the New York Theatre Workshop in New York City, gaining 20 pounds of muscle and going from 193 to 212 pounds. To prepare for the role, he stated that he "had to lift—bench presses, curls, squats, calf raises" and "get used to a new body".

Fisher had a cameo appearance as the superhero Victor Stone/Cyborg in the 2016 superhero film Batman v Superman: Dawn of Justice. The character was the first black superhero in the DC Extended Universe media franchise. He reprised the role as part of an ensemble cast in Justice League (2017), which generated lukewarm reviews and had an unsuccessful theatrical run. In 2020, Fisher accused director Joss Whedon of "abusive" and "unprofessional" behavior while filming Justice League. He also called DC Films executive Walter Hamada "the most dangerous kind of enabler" and stated that he "will not participate in any production associated with [Hamada]" in December 2020. While he was slated to appear in the film The Flash, Fisher stated in January 2021 that he had been removed from the film due to Hamada's involvement. He reprised the role of Cyborg in Zack Snyder's Justice League, the 2021 director's cut of Justice League. Fisher participated in the filming of new footage for the cut in October 2020. Reviewing the cut, Tom Jorgensen of IGN highlighted Fisher's nuanced and colorful portrayal and Alex Abad-Santos of Vox praised the "mix of rage and vulnerability" in his performance.

Fisher starred in the third season of the anthology crime drama series True Detective, which aired in 2019 on HBO. He portrayed Gene Mobley, the husband of activist Mamie Till-Mobley, in the 2022 ABC limited series Women of the Movement. That same year, he made his Broadway debut as Lymon in a revival of the play The Piano Lesson by August Wilson, for which he received a nomination for the Drama Desk Award for Outstanding Featured Actor in a Play. He reprised the role in a film adaptation of the play. Fisher played a warrior named Darrian Bloodaxe in the 2023 fantasy film Rebel Moon, reuniting with Zack Snyder, who directed the film, following working together on Justice League.

== Filmography ==
=== Film ===
Year	Title	Role	Notes	Ref.
2008	The Good, The Bad and The Confused	Patient	Short film	
2016	Batman v Superman: Dawn of Justice	Victor Stone / Cyborg	Cameo	
2017	Justice League	Victor Stone / Cyborg		
2021	Zack Snyder's Justice League	Victor Stone / Cyborg	Director's cut of Justice League	
2023	Rebel Moon – Part One: A Child of Fire	Darrian Bloodaxe		
2024	Rebel Moon – Part Two: The Scargiver	Darrian Bloodaxe		
2024	The Piano Lesson	Lymon		
2026	Being Heumann	Chuck Jackson		
2026	Animals	Ron Sperling		

=== Television ===
Year	Title	Role	Notes	Ref.
2015	The Astronaut Wives Club	Edward Dwight	Episode: "In the Blind"	
2019	True Detective	Henry Hays	Main role; Season 3	
2022	Women of the Movement	Gene Mobley	Main role; 4 episodes	

== Theater ==
Year	Title	Role	Locations	Ref.
2008	Attorney for the Damned	Marcus Blake	Kraine Theatre	
2009	Macbeth	Macbeth	Shakespeare Theatre of New Jersey	
2010	Fetch Clay, Make Man	Brother Jacob X	McCarter Theatre	
2011	To Kill a Mockingbird	Tom Robinson	Shakespeare Theatre of New Jersey	
2012	As You Like It	Jacques de Boys	Allen Elizabethan Theatre	
2013	King Lear	Duke of Burgundy	Thomas Theatre	
2013	Cymbeline	Arvirargus	Allen Elizabethan Theatre	
2013	Fetch Clay, Make Man	Muhammad Ali	New York Theatre Workshop	
2022	The Piano Lesson	Lymon	Ethel Barrymore Theatre	
2024	Macbeth	Macbeth	Shakespeare Theatre of New Jersey	

== Accolades ==
Year	Award	Category	Nominated work	Result	Ref.
2023	Drama Desk Awards	Outstanding Featured Performance in a Play	The Piano Lesson	Nominated	
2025	Black Reel Awards	Outstanding Breakthrough Performance	The Piano Lesson	Nominated	
