= List of True Detective episodes =

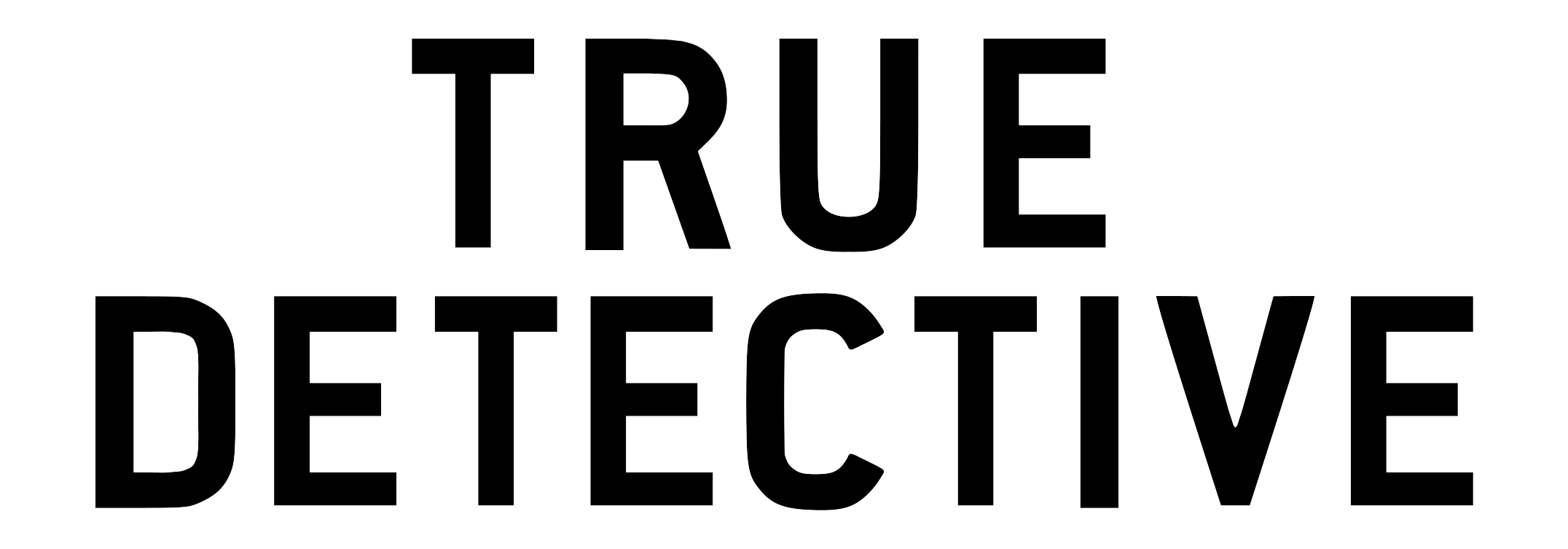

True Detective is an American anthology crime drama television series created and written by Nic Pizzolatto, that premiered on the premium cable network HBO on January 12, 2014. The series focuses on police investigations and on the effect they have on troubled detectives that carry them out. Each season is structured as a self-contained narrative with different sets of characters and settings. A fourth season, created by Issa López, premiered on January 14, 2024.

As of February 18, 2024, 30 episodes of True Detective have aired, concluding the fourth season. In February 2024, the series was renewed for a fifth season.

== Series overview ==
Season	Episodes	Originally released		Average viewers (in millions)
Season	Episodes	First released	Last released	Average viewers (in millions)
1	8	January 12, 2014	March 9, 2014	2.33
2	8	June 21, 2015	August 9, 2015	2.61
3	8	January 13, 2019	February 24, 2019	1.25
4	6	January 14, 2024	February 18, 2024	0.654

== Episodes ==
=== Season 1 (2014) ===
In 2012, two former homicide investigators with the Louisiana State Police's Criminal Investigations Division, Rustin "Rust" Cohle (Matthew McConaughey) and Martin "Marty" Hart (Woody Harrelson), are summoned for questioning by detectives Maynard Gilbough (Michael Potts) and Thomas Papania (Tory Kittles) about the Dora Lange murder investigation of 1995; they have not seen nor spoken to each other since an altercation concerning Martin's wife Maggie Hart (Michelle Monaghan) over a decade prior. With many of the old files destroyed in Hurricane Rita, the two men are asked to recount the history of their working relationship, personal lives, and the Dora Lange murder investigation, as well as a series of other related individual cases as new evidence suggests that the perpetrator remains at large.

No. overall	No. in season	Title	Directed by	Written by	Original release date	U.S. viewers (millions)
1	1	"The Long Bright Dark"	Cary Joji Fukunaga	Nic Pizzolatto	January 12, 2014	2.33
2	2	"Seeing Things"	Cary Joji Fukunaga	Nic Pizzolatto	January 19, 2014	1.67
3	3	"The Locked Room"	Cary Joji Fukunaga	Nic Pizzolatto	January 26, 2014	1.93
4	4	"Who Goes There"	Cary Joji Fukunaga	Nic Pizzolatto	February 9, 2014	1.99
5	5	"The Secret Fate of All Life"	Cary Joji Fukunaga	Nic Pizzolatto	February 16, 2014	2.25
6	6	"Haunted Houses"	Cary Joji Fukunaga	Nic Pizzolatto	February 23, 2014	2.64
7	7	"After You've Gone"	Cary Joji Fukunaga	Nic Pizzolatto	March 2, 2014	2.34
8	8	"Form and Void"	Cary Joji Fukunaga	Nic Pizzolatto	March 9, 2014	3.52

=== Season 2 (2015) ===
California Highway Patrol officer Paul Woodrugh (Taylor Kitsch) discovers the dead body of a city manager who was involved in a major land deal. Given the ambiguous jurisdictional nature of the crime scene, two other officers, Vinci Police Department Detective Raymond Velcoro (Colin Farrell) and Ventura County Sheriff's Office CID Antigone "Ani" Bezzerides (Rachel McAdams), are assigned to investigate the murder along with Woodrugh. The crime soon involves Frank Semyon (Vince Vaughn), a career criminal who was involved in the land deal and whose life savings were stolen when the murder took place. The three detectives, plus Semyon, quickly realize a larger conspiracy at play involving the victim's ties to the city of Vinci's deepening corrupt proliferations.

No. overall	No. in season	Title	Directed by	Written by	Original release date	U.S. viewers (millions)
9	1	"The Western Book of the Dead"	Justin Lin	Nic Pizzolatto	June 21, 2015	3.17
10	2	"Night Finds You"	Justin Lin	Nic Pizzolatto	June 28, 2015	3.05
11	3	"Maybe Tomorrow"	Janus Metz	Nic Pizzolatto	July 5, 2015	2.62
12	4	"Down Will Come"	Jeremy Podeswa	Nic Pizzolatto & Scott Lasser	July 12, 2015	2.36
13	5	"Other Lives"	John Crowley	Nic Pizzolatto	July 19, 2015	2.42
14	6	"Church in Ruins"	Miguel Sapochnik	Nic Pizzolatto & Scott Lasser	July 26, 2015	2.34
15	7	"Black Maps and Motel Rooms"	Daniel Attias	Nic Pizzolatto	August 2, 2015	2.18
16	8	"Omega Station"	John Crowley	Nic Pizzolatto	August 9, 2015	2.73

=== Season 3 (2019) ===
The story takes place in the Ozarks over three separate time periods. In 1980, partner detectives Wayne Hays (Mahershala Ali) and Roland West (Stephen Dorff) investigate a macabre crime involving two missing children. In 1990, Hays and West are subpoenaed after a major break in the case. In 2015, a retired Hays is asked by a true crime documentary producer to look back at the unsolved case.

No. overall	No. in season	Title	Directed by	Written by	Original release date	U.S. viewers (millions)
17	1	"The Great War and Modern Memory"	Jeremy Saulnier	Nic Pizzolatto	January 13, 2019	1.44
18	2	"Kiss Tomorrow Goodbye"	Jeremy Saulnier	Nic Pizzolatto	January 13, 2019	1.19
19	3	"The Big Never"	Daniel Sackheim	Nic Pizzolatto	January 20, 2019	1.06
20	4	"The Hour and the Day"	Nic Pizzolatto	Nic Pizzolatto & David Milch	January 27, 2019	1.45
21	5	"If You Have Ghosts"	Nic Pizzolatto	Nic Pizzolatto	February 3, 2019 (Note: The fifth episode was released online on HBO's streaming service on February 1, and released on normal broadcast television on February 3, 2019, as a result of having to air opposite Super Bowl LIII.)	0.88
22	6	"Hunters in the Dark"	Daniel Sackheim	Graham Gordy & Nic Pizzolatto	February 10, 2019	1.25
23	7	"The Final Country"	Daniel Sackheim	Nic Pizzolatto	February 17, 2019	1.32
24	8	"Now Am Found"	Daniel Sackheim	Nic Pizzolatto	February 24, 2019	1.38

=== Season 4: Night Country (2024) ===
In Ennis, Alaska, detectives Liz Danvers (Jodie Foster) and Evangeline Navarro (Kali Reis) investigate the disappearance of eight men who operate the Tsalal Arctic Research Station and vanish without a trace.

No. overall	No. in season	Title	Directed by	Written by	Original release date	U.S. viewers (millions)
25	1	"Part 1"	Issa López	Issa López	January 14, 2024	0.565
26	2	"Part 2"	Issa López	Issa López	January 21, 2024	0.678
27	3	"Part 3"	Issa López	Story by : Issa López; Teleplay by : Issa López and Alan Page Arriaga	January 28, 2024	0.602
28	4	"Part 4"	Issa López	Namsi Khan and Chris Mundy and Issa López	February 4, 2024	0.722
29	5	"Part 5"	Issa López	Katrina Albright & Wenonah Wilms and Chris Mundy & Issa López	February 11, 2024 (Note: The fifth episode was released online on HBO's streaming service on February 9, and released on normal broadcast television on February 11, 2024, as a result of having to air opposite Super Bowl LVIII.)	0.371
30	6	"Part 6"	Issa López	Issa López	February 18, 2024	0.983

== Ratings ==
True Detective : U.S. viewers per episode (millions)

Season	Episode number								Average
Season	1	2	3	4	5	6	7	8	Average
1	2.33	1.67	1.93	1.99	2.25	2.64	2.34	3.52	2.33
2	3.17	3.05	2.62	2.36	2.42	2.34	2.18	2.73	2.61
3	1.44	1.19	1.06	1.45	0.88	1.25	1.32	1.38	1.25
4	0.565	0.678	0.602	0.722	0.371	0.983	–		0.654

Audience measurement performed by Nielsen Media Research
