= Ohio Business Development Coalition =

Nonprofit trade association

The Ohio Business Development Coalition (OBDC) is a nonprofit trade association that encourages businesses to move in or stay in Ohio, United States. Funded by both public and private sector funds. The primary objective of the OBDC is to provide the Ohio Department of Development, the state's regional economic development organizations and chambers with both qualified leads and effective tools to retain and expand Ohio companies, and attract new companies to Ohio.

The OBDC website offers data and statistics on the state's economy through the following channels: Gross State Product (GSP), population, businesses, per capita disposable income, building permits. Additionally, the Office of Research provides reports, maps, and demographic data on economic activities and population trends across Ohio's cities, villages, townships, and counties.

== Awards and honors ==
Site Selection magazine, a location assistance publication, has awarded the state of Ohio its fourth consecutive Governor's Cup Award for leading the nation in new and expanded facilities in 2009.

The "Why Ohio" advertising campaign was noted by the business and advertising communities.

Other awards include:

- The Communicator Awards (2008)
- PRSA: Award of Excellence (2008 – Non-profit Website)
- Web Marketing Association: Web Awards (2008 Government Standard of Excellence)
- The American Business Awards: The Stevies (2007 – Best Magazine Campaign)
- IEDC: Excellence in Economic Development Awards (2007 – Best Advertising Campaign)

== Staff ==
The OBDC staff includes: Ed Burghard, executive director; Marlon Cheatham, brand manager; Matt McQuade, sales manager; and Kristi Tanner, brand manager.

== See also ==
- Outline of Ohio
- Site Selection
- Third Frontier
