= Seeing Things (True Detective) =

- True Detective episode
- Episode no.: Season 1 Episode 2
- Directed by: Cary Joji Fukunaga
- Written by: Nic Pizzolatto
- Cinematography by: Adam Arkapaw
- Editing by: Alex Hall
- Original air date: January 19, 2014
- Running time: 59 minutes

Guest appearances
- Alexandra Daddario as Lisa Tragnetti; Kevin Dunn as Major Ken Quesada; Tess Harper as Mrs. Kelly; Lili Simmons as Beth; Kate Adair as Call Girl; Jackson Beals as Detective Mark Daughtry; John Bernecker as Mechanic; Amy Brassette as Carla; Joe Chrest as Detective Demma; Andrea Frankle as Jan; Patricia French as Amanda Hebert; Dana Gourrier as Cathleen; Regis Harrington as Tweeker; Jim Klock as Detective Ted Bertrand; Garrett Kruithof as Detective Jimmy Dufrene; Anthony Molina as Detective; Thomas Francis Murphy as Jake Herbert; Alyshia Ochse as Lucy; Dane Rhodes as Detective Favre; Madison Wolfe as Audrey Hart; Meghan Wolfe as Maisie Hart

Episode chronology
← Previous "The Long Bright Dark"	Next → "The Locked Room"
- True Detective season 1

"Seeing Things" is the second episode of the first season of the American anthology crime drama television series True Detective. The episode was written by series creator Nic Pizzolatto, and directed by executive producer Cary Joji Fukunaga. It was first broadcast on HBO in the United States on January 19, 2014.

The season focuses on Louisiana State Police homicide detectives Rustin "Rust" Cohle (Matthew McConaughey) and Martin "Marty" Hart (Woody Harrelson), who investigate the murder of sex worker Dora Lange in 1995. Seventeen years later, they must revisit the investigation, along with several other unsolved crimes. In the episode, Cohle and Hart continue their investigation, which now extends to her stay at a church and a brothel. Cohle is revealed to have worked as an undercover cop in the past, while Hart is revealed to have been cheating on his wife.

According to Nielsen Media Research, the episode was seen by an estimated 1.67 million household viewers and gained a 0.7 ratings share among adults aged 18–49. The episode received critical acclaim, with critics praising the performances, directing, pace and cinematography.

== Plot ==
=== 2012 ===
Rust (Matthew McConaughey) tells Gilbough (Michael Potts) and Papania (Tory Kittles) more about his history: his relationships, his daughter's death, and his four-year stint as an undercover cop in a High Intensity Drug Trafficking Area.

After narrowly surviving a gunfight while undercover, Rust was offered pension. He instead asked to be assigned to the homicide beat and ended up with the Louisiana State Police. Due to heavy drug use during his undercover days, Rust admits he used to hallucinate regularly.

In a separate interrogation, Marty (Woody Harrelson) remarks how Rust, while difficult to work with, is highly effective at his job. Marty and Maggie are revealed to have divorced.

=== 1995 ===
Rust and Marty question Dora Lange's mother (Tess Harper), who says that Dora had been regularly attending church before her death. A friend of Dora's corroborates this, also noting that Dora seemed under the influence of substances when she last saw her. She says Dora had been living at a place called the Ranch.

Later that night, Marty visits Lisa Tragnetti (Alexandra Daddario), a woman with whom he is having an affair. They have sex and Marty expresses jealousy when Lisa talks about going on dates with other men. Elsewhere, while buying methaqualone from a sex worker, Rust is told about a brothel called the Ranch. The next morning, tensions rise between the duo when Rust insinuates to Marty that he knows Marty is having an affair.

The duo decide to track down the Ranch. Rust assaults two men to get the Ranch's address, impressing Marty. At the Ranch, they question Beth (Lili Simmons), who gives them Dora's bag, in which they find a diary mentioning "The Yellow King in Carcosa." Marty confronts the brothel's madam, Jan (Andrea Frankle), for employing Beth, who is a minor. Jan tells him he is only uncomfortable with girls having sex because it means they're owning their sexuality. Marty gives Beth money and tells her to do something else with her life.

At the behest of the influential Reverend Billy Lee Tuttle (Jay O. Sanders), a new police task force is created to investigate crimes with possible anti-Christian connotations. The task force moves to take over Dora Lange's murder case, but Marty convinces their supervisor to give them two more weeks to solve it.

Marty and Rust find Dora's old church, but the building has been destroyed in a fire. As they inspect it, they find a drawing on a wall of a woman with an antler crown, staged in a similar position to Dora's body.

== Production ==
=== Development ===
In January 2014, the episode's title was revealed as "Seeing Things" and it was announced that series creator Nic Pizzolatto had written the episode and executive producer Cary Joji Fukunaga had directed it. This was Pizzolatto's second writing credit and Fukunaga's second directing credit.

== Reception ==
=== Viewers ===
The episode was watched by 1.67 million viewers, earning a 0.7 in the 18-49 rating demographics on the Nielson ratings scale. This means that 0.7 percent of all households with televisions watched the episode. This was a 29% decrease from the previous episode, which was watched by 2.33 million viewers with a 1.0 in the 18-49 demographics.

=== Critical reviews ===
"Seeing Things" received critical acclaim. Jim Vejvoda of IGN gave the episode an "amazing" 9 out of 10, writing, "As we begin to learn more about what makes Marty and Rust tick as people, we also dive deeper into an existential morass. True Detective may not be the feel good show of 2014, but it sure is great at making you want to fall down this particularly bleak rabbit hole."

Erik Adams of The A.V. Club gave the episode a B+ and wrote, "Television history is full of characters who hold the same job as Marty and Rust; the medium's more recent history is full of men who behave like Marty. But what's making True Detective exceptional programming is in the way the program doesn't indulge their masks or their disguises, instead getting right to the point of depicting the animals within." Britt Hayes of Screen Crush wrote, "It becomes quite clear in 'Seeing Things' that Woody Harrelson and Matthew McConaughey are indeed very much playing to type, but they're so damn good at it."

Alan Sepinwall of HitFix wrote, "So even though some progress is made in the case, with the ruined church having a familiar-looking antler painting on one of the surviving walls, what we have mostly investigated here are these two men, one of whom claims to have all the answers but really understands almost nothing about himself and his surroundings, the other of whom understands far too well, and has therefore given up. Flip a coin as to which one of them you'd want to be. Neither option seems appealing right now, even as True Detective itself only becomes more engrossing in this second installment." Gwilym Mumford of The Guardian wrote, "This episode is preoccupied is [sic] masculinity, and the ways in which men seek to control the world around them—but there is still no sign of a suspect."

Kenny Herzog of Vulture gave the episode 5 stars out of 5 and wrote, "Although outside of Cohle's Big Hug Mug at the '12 case interview and his way of half-heartedly demeaning possible sources into Dora's death, along with alluded-to stock office dustups, True Detective has already shed nearly any trace of being blackly comic. In fact, apart from the napalm-sky visions Cohle encounters en route to leads on the Dora Lange case, 'Seeing Things' is as charred as that torched First Revival Church. But as we head toward chapter three of eight, there's more to like in its darkening pull." Tony Sokol of Den of Geek also gave the episode a full 5 stars and wrote, "Marty learns that the new detectives, the ones handling it now, in 2014, not the task force investigating animal mutilations, are onto something new. Once again, there is no fluff or bullshit on HBO's True Detective. Even Rust Cohle's flashbacks are handled realistically. He can tell what's real and what's not. Whether it's from the drug residue, political circle jerks or satanic scrawlings on abandoned churches, it sometimes feels like he's mainlining the secret truths of the universe."

Chris O'Hara of TV Fanatic alao gave the episode a 5-star rating and wrote, "With the second installment in the book, I can confidently say that I think we have a winner on our hands. The show reminds me more of The Killing than anything else, and that is a good thing in my mind. It's not the first crime drama and won't be the last, but the combination of Harrelson and McConaughey I think, will set True Detective apart from the rest." Shane Ryan of Paste gave the episode a 9.8 out of 10 and wrote, "It's difficult to know where to begin here, because I'm on fire with this show in a way that hasn't happened since—when? The Wire? But The Wire is organized and clinical and entirely different, lighting unrelated, landlocked pleasure zones of the superego, so the comparison doesn't make sense. Different passions, different planet altogether. This, this True Detective, is an offering of a separate magnitude, something bright and intelligent yet ultimately murky, ultimately of the id."
