= The Locked Room (True Detective) =

- True Detective episode
- Episode no.: Season 1 Episode 3
- Directed by: Cary Joji Fukunaga
- Written by: Nic Pizzolatto
- Cinematography by: Adam Arkapaw
- Editing by: Affonso Gonçalves
- Original air date: January 26, 2014
- Running time: 58 minutes

Guest appearances
- Alexandra Daddario as Lisa Tragnetti; Kevin Dunn as Major Ken Quesada; Shea Whigham as Pastor Joel Theriot; Robert Beitzel as Chris Louviere; Joe Chrest as Detective Demma; Jamie Elliott as Tina; JD Evermore as Detective Lutz; Glenn Fleshler as Lawnmower Man; Dana Gourrier as Cathleen; Douglas M. Griffin as Burt; Charles Halford as Reggie Ledoux; Sharon Landry as Linda; Maryanne Marino as Singer; Ritchie Montgomery as Henry Olivier; Dane Rhodes as Detective Favre; Jo-El Sonnier as Accordion Player; Bree Williamson as Jennifer; Madison Wolfe as Audrey Hart; Meghan Wolfe as Maisie Hart

Episode chronology
← Previous "Seeing Things"	Next → "Who Goes There"
- True Detective season 1

"The Locked Room" is the third episode of the first season of the American anthology crime drama television series True Detective. The episode was written by series creator Nic Pizzolatto, and directed by executive producer Cary Joji Fukunaga. It was first broadcast on HBO in the United States on January 26, 2014.

The season focuses on Louisiana State Police homicide detectives Rustin "Rust" Cohle (Matthew McConaughey) and Martin "Marty" Hart (Woody Harrelson), who investigate the murder of sex worker Dora Lange in 1995. Seventeen years later, they must revisit the investigation, along with several other unsolved crimes. In the episode, Cohle and Hart try to find more about Dora's relation with the church and find crucial evidence linking her to an old case. Meanwhile, Hart's personal life gets further complicated when his anger takes over as he sees Lisa with another man.

According to Nielsen Media Research, the episode was seen by an estimated 1.93 million household viewers and gained a 0.8 ratings share among adults aged 18–49. The episode received critical acclaim, with critics praising the performances, directing, pace and cinematography. For his performance in the episode, Woody Harrelson received an Outstanding Lead Actor in a Drama Series nomination at the 66th Primetime Emmy Awards.

== Plot ==
=== 2012 ===
Rust (Matthew McConaughey) tells Gilbough (Michael Potts) and Papania (Tory Kittles) about his view of religion, deeming it a failed attempt to sell "the light at the end of the tunnel." In contrast, Marty (Woody Harrelson) presents his own version of morality, drawing parallels to his own demons.

Marty tells Papania and Gilbough of Rust's skills in the interrogation room and his ability to extract confessions out of suspects.

Marty and Rust then hint of an upcoming gunfight with the suspects of Lange's murder.

=== 1995 ===
A week after discovering the burnt church, Rust and Marty observe a Friends of Christ Revival service, now held in a church tent. As Pastor Joel Theriot (Shea Whigham) gives a sermon, Rust expresses his distaste for organized religion while Marty views it as useful structure to maintain peace within the community. Questioning Theriot and other church members after the sermon, they learn that Dora frequented the church and had last been seen with a tall man with a scarred face.

Tensions rise between the duo when Marty comes home one day to find Rust having mowed his lawn and drinking tea with Maggie (Michelle Monaghan). At school, Marty's elder daughter draws pictures of people having sex. Maggie is unhappy with how Marty dealt with the issue and with their marriage in general. Marty blames the Lange case and his midlife crisis for his state of constant distraction.

Marty and Maggie try to set up Rust with Maggie's friend Jen (Bree Williamson) and they go on a double date. While they are out, Marty sees Lisa (Alexandra Daddario) on a date with another man. Later that evening, Marty forces his way into Lisa's apartment, nearly assaulting the man.

Still convinced that Dora's killer has killed before, Rust spends hours looking through photos of dead bodies in old case files. He finds a spiral symbol similar to the one on Lange's body on the dead body of Rianne Olivier, a girl who was reported to have drowned during a flood. They question Olivier's grandfather (Ritchie Montgomery). He mentions that she had a boyfriend named Reggie Ledoux. Marty and Rust learn that Olivier attended Light of the Way Academy, a religious school that was run by Tuttle's foundation.

Marty and Rust visit the school. Rust encounters the groundskeeper (Glenn Fleshler) at the school and asks about the school's history. Through the radio, Marty and Rust learn that Reggie Ledoux was an ex-con who violated his parole eight months ago after serving a sentence for running a meth lab. During his prison sentence, he was cellmates with Charlie Lange, Dora's husband. Realizing the connection, they put out an all-points bulletin on Ledoux. Somewhere in the woods, Ledoux (Charles Halford) is seen outside his house, half-naked, wearing a gas mask and wielding a machete.

== Production ==
=== Development ===
In January 2014, the episode's title was revealed as "The Locked Room" and it was announced that series creator Nic Pizzolatto had written the episode while executive producer Cary Joji Fukunaga had directed it. This was Pizzolatto's third writing credit, and Fukunaga's third directing credit.

== Reception ==
=== Viewers ===
The episode was watched by 1.93 million viewers, earning a 0.8 in the 18-49 rating demographics on the Nielson ratings scale. This means that 0.8 percent of all households with televisions watched the episode. This was a 15% increase from the previous episode, which was watched by 1.67 million viewers with a 0.7 in the 18-49 demographics.

=== Critical reviews ===
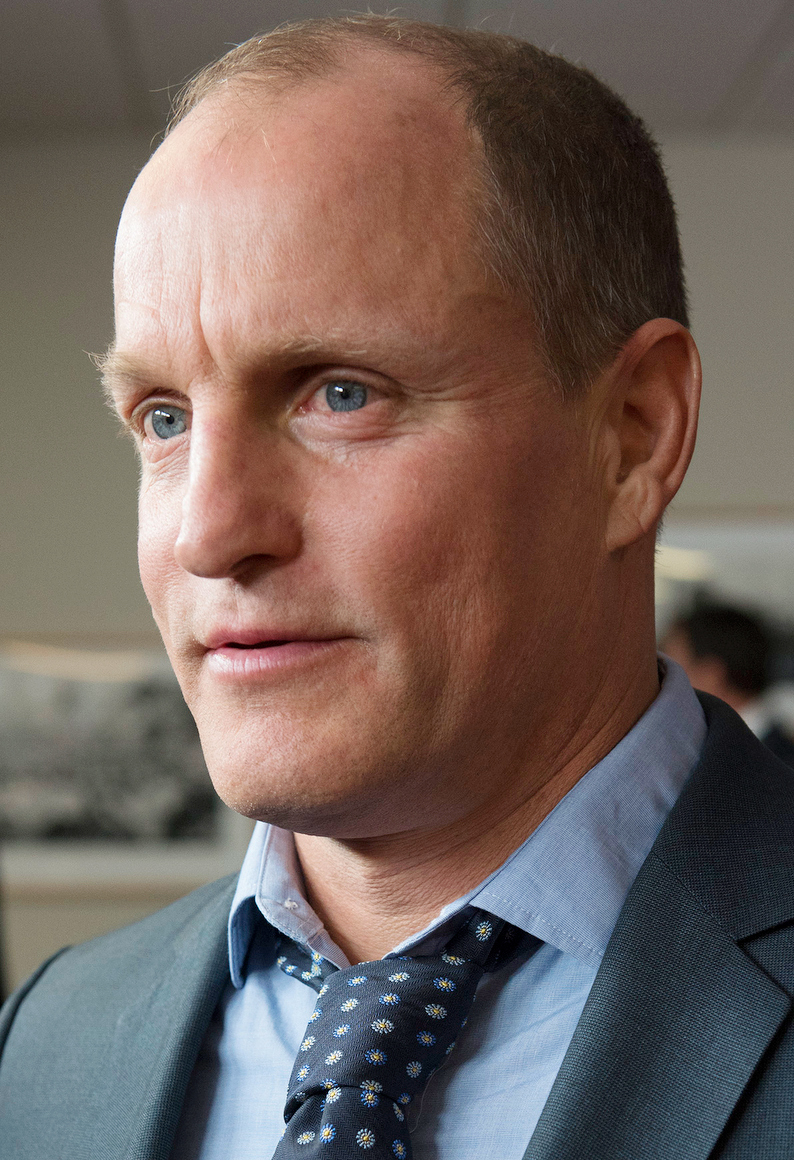
For his performance in the episode, Woody Harrelson was nominated for Outstanding Lead Actor in a Drama Series at the 66th Primetime Emmy Awards.

"The Locked Room" received critical acclaim. Jim Vejvoda of IGN gave the episode an "amazing" 9 out of 10 and wrote in his verdict, "Hart's temper and insecurities get the better of him and the hunt for a suspect narrows in this week's engrossing episode of True Detective. Also, don't mow Marty's lawn when he's not around. He really, really hates that."

Erik Adams of The A.V. Club gave the episode an "A−" grade and wrote, "Rust has come across a lot of lowlifes, and he can read a person within 10 minutes of meeting them, but he isn't as consumed by the darkness as the specter that stalks through the final seconds of 'The Locked Room.' Or maybe he is, and True Detective is holding back the truth of the matter for the time being. Secret or no secret, that's a hell of a way to pull the viewer into the next episode." Britt Hayes of Screen Crush wrote, "Our final shot presents us with our monster, the one that waited for Dora outside the locked room of her mind, deflating all those hopes and dreams and putting an end to the struggle she called life."

Alan Sepinwall of HitFix wrote, "It's clear by now that the 2012 detectives are looking at Rust Cohle as more than just a source of information about their case. And while I expect the solution to be much more complicated than Cohle being a secret serial killer, you can understand – based on what little we know of events so far, and what we've seen of the man in two different time periods – why a pair of veteran cops might size the guy up and take him for a maniac." Gwilym Mumford of The Guardian wrote, "Even by True Detective's standards, this is a particularly introspective hour of television, but equally it is one that propels the story forward in a way that the show's opening two episodes were unwilling to do. By the end of the hour, thanks to Cohle and Hart's diligent detective work, we have our first tangible lead."

Kenny Herzog of Vulture gave the episode a perfect 5 star rating out of 5 and wrote, "'The Locked Room', and this also applies to True Detective through three chapters, excelled because it seemed like you're figuring out the whodunit right along with Hart and Cohle in 1995, down to every detail. It's the sensation of a radio serial set to film, and is very Fincher-ian." Tony Sokol of Den of Geek gave the episode a perfect 5 star rating out of 5 and wrote, "I can watch Woody and Matt's conversations even without the plot. The way they bob and weave, it's like two middleweights. All of the acting is top of the game stuff, but these two together, barely being kept from each other's throats, is a ball. They bite down on their best lines and spit them out like darts only to be caught in the other's teeth and nibbled before swallowing. At heart, this is all gearing up to a gun battle and these guys are the id and ego of Gary Cooper in High Noon. They are all-American. They may not be silent but they're strong and their strengths are being tested. The sun reaches high noon in the middle of the day though. They may be facing a monster, but it won't be under cover of darkness. This monster is going to be in their face. He may be strutting around in his underwear but his face is covered with a gas mask. Nightmare in the afternoon and there's still a whole day to go."

Chris O'Hara of TV Fanatic gave the episode a perfect 5 star rating out of 5 and wrote, "As the episode came to a close, we got our first glimpse at one of those men. The gas mask swung from Reggie's head like a trunk. The elephant they had been looking for in all those interrogation rooms, a hunting trophy of their own, was within reach as the stage was set for what should be a pivotal episode to follow." Shane Ryan of Paste gave the episode a 9.7 out of 10 and wrote, "In a show as thoughtful and expansive as True Detective, it's possible to find thematic lines of dialogue in every utterance. For me, though, the centerpiece of 'The Locked Room' comes as Rust Cohle holds court in his former police station, behind a fortress of empty Lone Star beer cans, and explains his uncanny success as an interrogator in the years before he quit his job and became a full-time drunk."

=== Accolades ===
Woody Harrelson submitted the episode to support his nomination for Outstanding Lead Actor in a Drama Series at the 66th Primetime Emmy Awards.
