= The Long Bright Dark =

- True Detective episode
- Martin and Rustin examine the murder scene of Dora Lange.
- Episode no.: Season 1 Episode 1
- Directed by: Cary Joji Fukunaga
- Written by: Nic Pizzolatto
- Original air date: January 12, 2014
- Running time: 60 minutes

Guest appearances
- Kevin Dunn as Major Ken Quesada; Michael Harney as Sheriff Steve Geraci; Alexandra Daddario as Lisa Tragnetti; Clarke Peters as Minister; Jay O. Sanders as Billy Lee Tuttle; Alyshia Ochse as Lucy; Charleigh Harmon as Anette; Meghan Wolfe as Macie Hart; Madison Wolfe as Audrey Hart; Brad Carter as Charlie Lange; Christopher Berry as Danny Fontenot; Dana Gourrier as Cathleen

Episode chronology
← Previous —	Next → "Seeing Things"
- True Detective season 1

"The Long Bright Dark" is the series premiere of the anthology crime drama True Detective, initially broadcast on HBO on January 12, 2014 in the United States. Directed by Cary Joji Fukunaga and written by creator Nic Pizzolatto, the episode introduces True Detective's core cast of characters, led by Louisiana State Police homicide detectives Rustin "Rust" Cohle (Matthew McConaughey) and Martin "Marty" Hart (Woody Harrelson). The storyline is non-linear and jumps between timelines in 1995 and 2012.

Pizzolatto conceived True Detective as a novel, but felt it was more suitable for television once the project took definite form. Producers chose Louisiana for the show's setting after they obtained tax credits to subsidize the costs of shooting. "The Long Bright Dark" was shot entirely in 35 mm film, and principal photography for the season lasted 100 consecutive days.

"The Long Bright Dark" was well received in the media. Critics praised the show's storytelling approach, sleek production, and actors, often singling out McConaughey and Harrelson for their onscreen chemistry. However, the writing's exposition and execution of ideas were occasional sources of criticism. The initial broadcast of "The Long Bright Dark" drew 2.3 million viewers, becoming HBO's highest rated series premiere in several years.

== Plot ==
=== 2012 ===
Martin "Marty" Hart (Woody Harrelson), a former detective of the Louisiana State Police's Criminal Investigations Division, is interviewed by detectives Maynard Gilbough (Michael Potts) and Thomas Papania (Tory Kittles). Marty's former partner, Rustin "Rust" Cohle (Matthew McConaughey), is questioned separately.

Marty and Rust are asked about their relationship prior to their falling out and the details of a particular closed murder case, the perpetrator of which they found in 1995. A similar murder is revealed to have occurred recently.

=== 1995 ===
Marty and Rust arrive at a scene where a woman's body has been found. Her body is crowned with deer antlers and bound near a tree in a kneeling position, surrounded by numerous twig latticework sculptures.

From details on the body, Rust deduces she was a sex worker. Analyzing the iconography of the setting, he tells Marty the woman was likely a "paraphiliac love map" of the perpetrator's lustful fantasies forbidden by society. Rust believes the perpetrator has killed before and will kill again. Marty tells Rust he is jumping to conclusions. Leaving the crime scene, Rust reveals his nihilistic world view and his belief that humans should stop procreating.

Marty invites Rust to dinner at his wife Maggie's (Michelle Monaghan) insistence. Rust arrives drunk after informally interviewing two sex workers in a bar for any leads on the victim. Marty arranges for Rust to leave, but Rust stays after chatting with Maggie. Rust tells Maggie his 2-year-old daughter died years ago, the grief from which ended his marriage.

The body is identified as Dora Lange. An autopsy reveals Lange had been strangled, tortured and raped. Toxicology finds traces of LSD and methamphetamine in her bloodstream.

The duo visit Dora's ex-husband Charlie (Brad Carter) in prison. He tells them that she sounded erratic during their last phone call, talking about becoming a nun and meeting a king.

Back at the station, Rust meets Reverend Billy Lee Tuttle (Jay O. Sanders), a minister from a powerful local family and the first cousin of the state governor. Tuttle suggests creating a task force to investigate crimes with anti-Christian connotations, implying Lange's murder is one.

Marty and Rust return to Erath, the town near where Dora's body was found. They learn that a girl recently reported being chased by a "green-eared spaghetti monster" in the woods nearby. A local tells them of Marie Fontenot, a 10-year-old girl who five years ago went missing in the area. The duo visit Marie's family. Rust searches their property and stumbles upon a twig sculpture similar to those discovered at Lange's scene.

== Production ==
=== Development ===
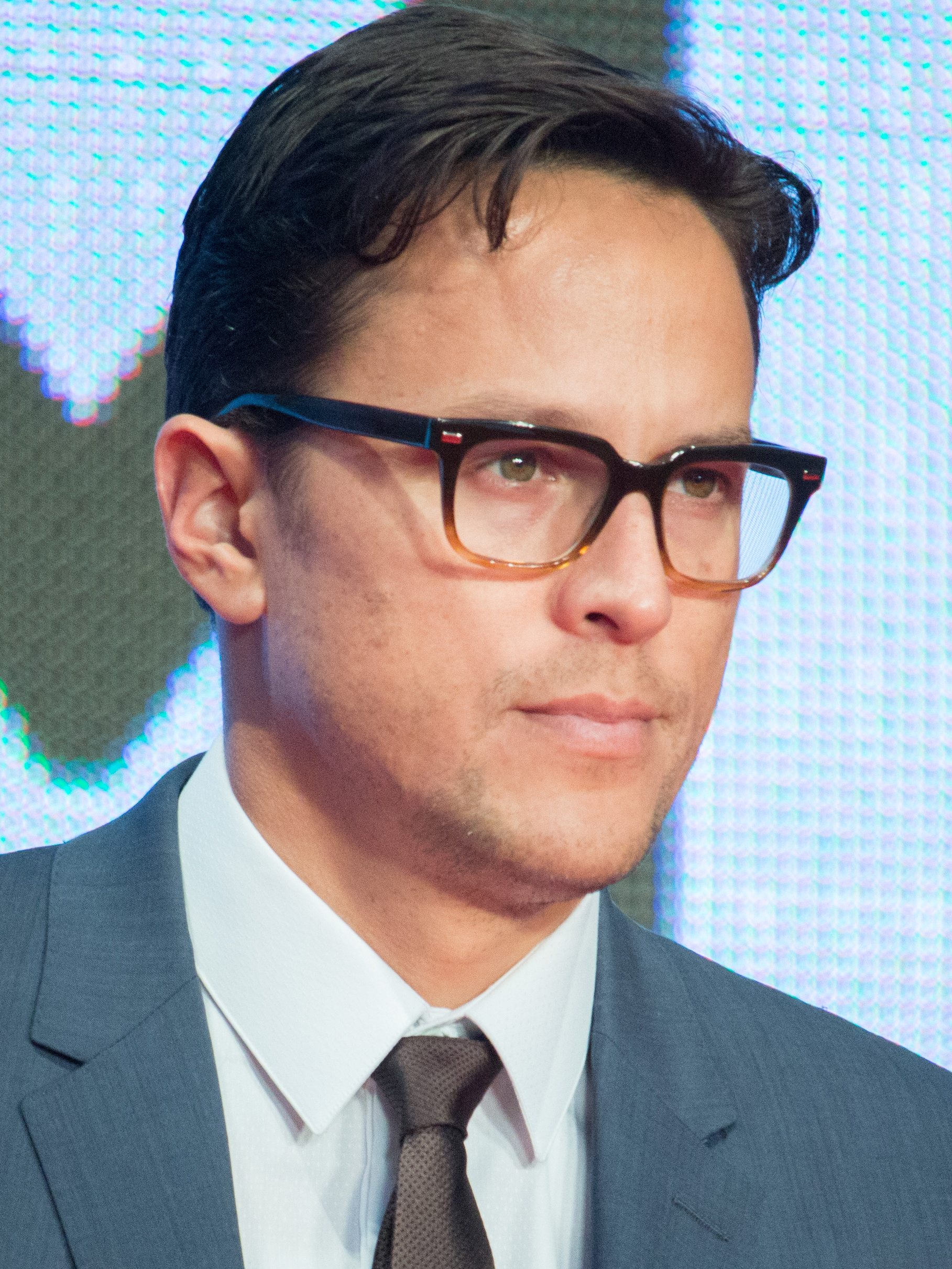
"The Long Bright Dark" was directed by Cary Joji Fukunaga.

Nic Pizzolatto, a writer and series creator, delved into fiction writing and published a novel, titled Galveston (2010), before being appointed as a screenwriter for AMC's The Killing the following year. It was around this time that Pizzolatto was preparing to branch out into television, an endeavor that, due to a lack of capital, was never fully realized. He had already begun writing True Detective as his next novel, but later, once the project took definite form, felt it was more suitable on screen. "I'd always had plans from the first time I'd talked to an agent from Hollywood, I was going to ask how you break into this business, and particularly cable-TV writing, because in television the writer stays in control, which is what the concept of show runner is", he remembers. Pizzolatto pitched Galveston to several executives, and from May to July 2010, he drafted six screenplays, including a spec script for "The Long Bright Dark" which consumed 90 pages. Shortly thereafter, he secured a development deal with HBO for a potential pilot series.

Pizzolatto's stint with The Killing provided him a glimpse of the inner workings of the television industry, but grew increasingly dissatisfied with the show's creative direction, eventually leaving the writing staff two weeks into the program's second season. "I want to be the guiding vision. I don't do well serving someone else's vision. I'm not at my best there, and I don't think I’m worth as much to the people who pay me." He soon directed his attention to working on another script for the True Detective project, encouraged by Anonymous Content.

Alejandro González Iñárritu was initially expected to be appointed as director, but film commitments later forced him to pull out of the project. Pizzolatto instead approached Cary Joji Fukunaga, who he knew from Anonymous Content, to take up the task. Fukunaga spent time conducting research with a homicide detective of the Louisiana State Police's Criminal Investigations Division in preparation for his services. Based on the officer's own personal experiences, the director was able to develop "a nice sense of what it must be like to be a detective in Louisiana—especially in that time period in the '90s, which was pre-cell phone, and technology was about to change the way we all live our lives. That's what I did. I'm not a big serial killer studier—I've never analyzed books about that kind of stuff and I've never really watched procedurals. Those parts of the story were the least attractive to me; I was doing it mainly for the characters."

=== Casting ===
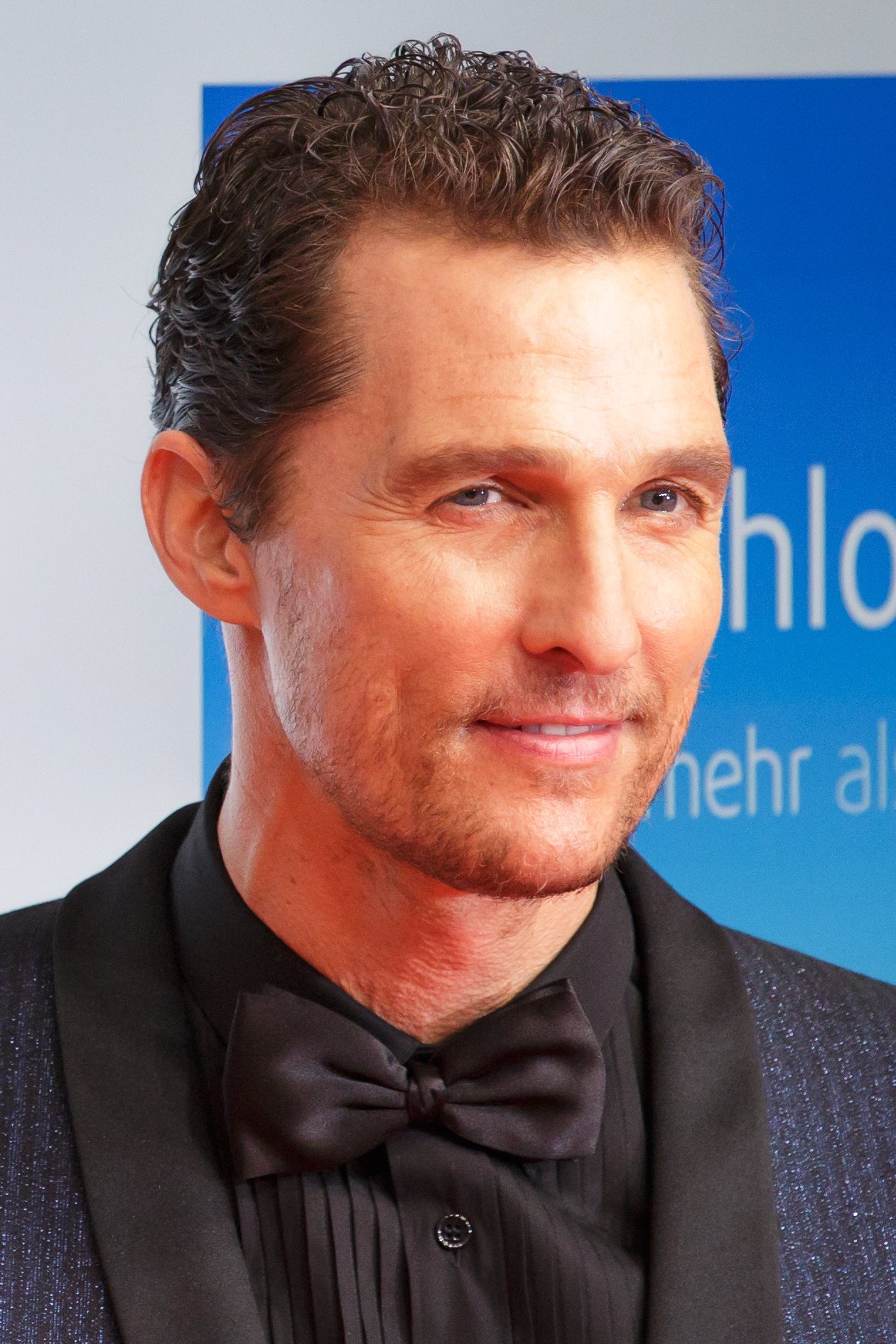
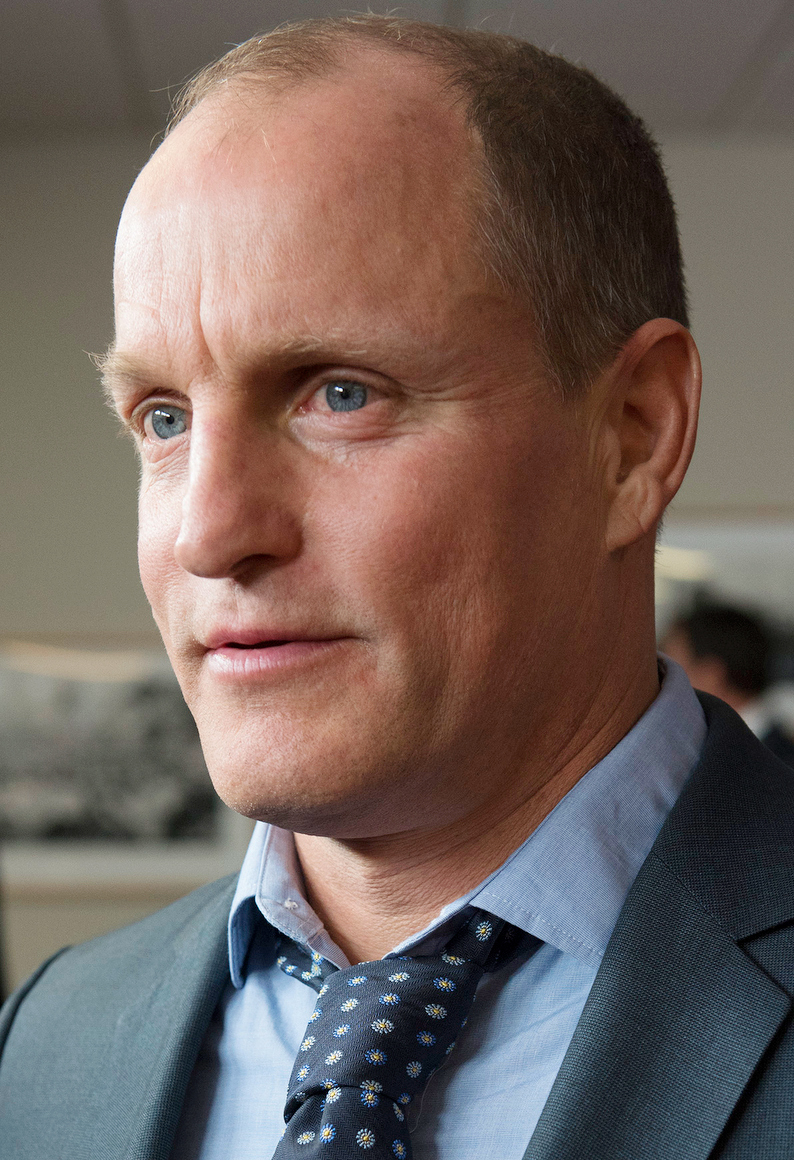
Matthew McConaughey (left) and Woody Harrelson (right) were among a small list of candidates considered for the male leads.

McConaughey and Harrelson were among a small pool of actors considered suitable candidates for top billing. Producers contracted McConaughey, who had recently finished filming Killer Joe (2011), well before True Detective was greenlit by HBO. Pizzolatto, impressed with the actor's performance in The Lincoln Lawyer (2011), originally assigned him the role of Martin Hart, but McConaughey offered "a really compelling argument" for portraying Rustin "Rust" Cohle. When asked about his decision to switch parts in a Variety interview, McConaughey replied: "I wanted to get in that dude’s head. The obsession, the island of a man—I’m always looking for a guy who monologues. It’s something really important as I feel I’m going into my better work." To prepare, the actor studied his character through what he described the "Four Stages of Rustin Cohle", a 450-page document he created detailing Rustin's evolution over the course of the story.

Meanwhile, Harrelson was attached to the role of Martin under McConaughey's recommendation. Having previously starred in the HBO film Game Change (2012), Harrelson gravitated to the project due in part to his colleagues; "I love Matthew. He's my brother. He's a phenomenal, amazing person. And I love Michelle [Monaghan]. I've known her many, many years. Cary [Fukunaga] is a terrific director. And Nic [Pizzolatto] wrote this phenomenal script that you just couldn’t put down. His writing is so amazing." Monaghan was chosen to play the female lead, Martin Hart's wife Maggie; the actress took an interest in True Detective as she realized her character arc and "really saw where these characters went." Potts acted as Detective Maynard Gilbough, and Kittles played his partner Detective Thomas Papania.

=== Filming ===
The initial location for principal photography for True Detective was Arkansas; however, Pizzolatto later opted to film in southern Louisiana to capitalize on generous statewide tax incentives and the area's distinctive landscape, which he felt illustrated a striking paradox. "There's a contradictory nature to the place and a sort of sinister quality underneath it all," the native Louisianan noted. "Everything lives under layers of concealment. The woods are thick and dark and impenetrable. On the other hand you have the beauty of it all from a distance." "The Long Bright Dark" and subsequent episodes were shot in 35 mm film, and principal photography for the season consumed 100 consecutive days. The crew filmed exterior shots at a remote sugarcane field outside of Erath, Louisiana which, because it was partially burned, inspired a "moody and atmospheric" backdrop for corresponding scenes. Fukunaga recruited Adam Arkapaw, previously director of photography for Top of the Lake, as project cinematographer and employed minimalistic lighting for layering composition. Also involved in production was Alex DiGerlando, who Fukunaga had previously worked with on Benh Zeitlin's Glory at Sea (2008). The director remarked in an interview, "I knew what Alex accomplished in the swamps of Louisiana and given some money, how much more amazing he could be in building sets that would just be used for one or two days and be abandoned again."

== Reception ==
=== Ratings ===
In its initial American broadcast, "The Long Bright Dark" was seen by an estimated 2.3 million viewers. It was the highest rated series premiere out of any HBO program in the last four years, falling behind only the series premiere of Boardwalk Empire, which drew 4.8 million viewers. The episode performed exceptionally well with adults between the ages of 18 and 49, recording a 1.0 rating in that demographic. "The Long Bright Dark" was the fifth highest rated cable telecast of the night by total viewership. The United Kingdom terrestrial premiere was broadcast on February 22, 2014, by Sky Atlantic, garnering 707,000 viewers.

=== Critical response ===
"The Long Bright Dark" was critically acclaimed by most critics. Tim Goodman from The Hollywood Reporter said Fukunaga develops "a beautiful, sprawling sense of place" in the premiere, and identified the ensemble and the writing, which he believed "undulates from effectively brash soliloquies to penetratingly nuanced moments carried by sparse prose", as two of its other most satisfying attributes. Marshall Crook of The Wall Street Journal agreed, writing the show hits the mark with "good acting, smart writing, and lush cinematography". Willa Paskin of Slate described the episode as "creepy, gorgeous, unsettling, and searching" and noticed "a literary quality, an accretion of meaningful detail" within the show's narrative. The Daily Beast's Andrew Romano said the premiere, together with the former half of the season, compose "one of the most riveting and provocative series I've ever seen", while Entertainment Weekly critic Jeff Jensen called it "an enthralling murder mystery about history, culture, and heroic character".

The new drama, written by novelist Nic Pizzolatto and directed by Cary Joji Fukunaga, does something I wasn't sure was possible: By focusing on two vastly different detectives more than on the case they're investigating, it adds a fresh twist to the crowded cops-and-serial-killers genre

— Curt Wagner, RedEye

Brian Lowry, reviewing for Variety, called "The Long Bright Dark" a "rich and absorbing" episode where True Detective immediately assumes a unique identity from other police procedurals, and wrote the cast ensemble consisted of "fine players on the periphery". Writing in USA Today, Robert Bianco felt McConaughey and Harrelson not only met, but occasionally even exceeded "enormously high" performance expectations of the "golden age of TV acting". David Wiegand of the San Francisco Chronicle singled out the duo as being "in a class of their own", and Los Angeles Times journalist Robert Lloyd thought the character work from the two men was of "a very high order". Sarah Rodman of The Boston Globe, though finding the program's grim tone to be occasionally excessive, opined that the two men successfully engaged audiences enough to invest in the series with their performances. Monaghan also received kudos from Rodman for her work in the episode. Additional praise for ensemble performances, chiefly for McConaughey and Harrelson, came from Time's James Poniewozik, The New York Times critic Mike Hale, Curt Wagner in RedEye, The Independent's Sarah Hughes, and Gwilym Mumford of The Guardian.

Bianco said the show avoided character stereotypes, and Alan Sepinwall in HitFix felt Cohle and Hart developed into such riveting characters "that they paper over some of the series' weaknesses". The Daily Telegraph critic Chris Harvey awarded "The Long Bright Dark" five out of five stars, hailing True Detective as "the most ambitious TV drama for a long time".

Not all critics were as enthusiastic in their reviews of "The Long Bright Dark". Hale, despite commending the flashback narrative, believed the dialogue devolved into "a languid character study and a vehicle for long-winded exchanges about religion and responsibility that are writerly in the worst way." Chris Cabin from Slant Magazine agreed that the writing too readily "defers to an earnest, rote view of bad religion", but wrote that Pizzolatto and Fukunaga "smartly embrace the pulpiness of their material". Hank Stuever, writing for The Washington Post, observed "mumbly, bloodshot fatigue" in the story, and felt the series fell short of its ambitions. "In its better moments, True Detective feels like a fever dream, but mostly it’s just groggy," Stuever concluded. Emily Nussbaum of The New Yorker was especially critical of the show and claimed it relished in "macho nonsense".
