= The Hour and the Day =

- True Detective episode
- Episode no.: Season 3 Episode 4
- Directed by: Nic Pizzolatto
- Written by: Nic Pizzolatto; David Milch
- Cinematography by: Nigel Bluck
- Editing by: Leo Trombetta
- Original air date: January 27, 2019
- Running time: 66 minutes

Guest appearances
- Brett Cullen as George Kindt; Sarah Gadon as Elisa Montgomery; Michael Greyeyes as Brett Woodard; Mamie Gummer as Lucy Purcell; Rhys Wakefield as Freddy Burns; Jodi Balfour as Lori; Seth Barrish as Priest; Candyce Hinkle as Patty Faber; Joseph Callender as Liquor Store Proprietor; John Earl Jelks as Sam Whitehead; Lorenzo Yearby as Neighbor #1; David T. Anthony as Neighbor #2; Sasha Morfaw as Neighbor #3; James MacDonald as Major Blevins; Greg Bryan as Jay Bunda; L. Warren Young as Detective; Bill Kelly as Detective Hobbs; David Stanbra as Detective Segar; Myk Watford as Detective Morelli; Michael Broderick as Agent John Bowen; Tim Griffin as Agent Burt Diller; Brian Oerly as Eddie; Isaiah C. Morgan as Young Henry Hays; Kennedi Lynn Butler as Young Becca Hays; Bojesse Christopher as Detective Richard Kitting; Bea Santos as 21 Year Old Julie Purcell; Chad Cline as Sallisaw PD Officer; Brooklyn Courtney-Moore as Soda Can Girl #1; Berkeley Courtney-Moore as Soda Can Girl #2; Mary Kathryn Bryant as State Police Receptionist

Episode chronology
← Previous "The Big Never"	Next → "If You Have Ghosts"
- True Detective (season 3)

"The Hour and the Day" is the fourth episode of the third season of the American anthology crime drama television series True Detective. It is the 20th overall episode of the series and was written by series creator Nic Pizzolatto and David Milch, and directed by Pizzolatto. It was first broadcast on HBO in the United States on January 27, 2019.

The season takes place in the Ozarks over three separate time periods. In 1980, partner detectives Wayne Hays (Mahershala Ali) and Roland West (Stephen Dorff) as they investigate a macabre crime involving two missing children, Will and Julie Purcell. In 1990, Hays is questioned after the case is re-opened after new evidence resurfaces. In 2015, an old Hays with memory problems conducts an interview to discuss the case. In the episode, Hays and West connect Will to a Catholic church, which may have clues to the person responsible for the dolls. In the other time periods, Hays and West review Julie's possible sighting.

According to Nielsen Media Research, the episode was seen by an estimated 1.45 million household viewers and gained a 0.4 ratings share among adults aged 18–49. The episode received generally positive reviews from critics, who praised the character development, performances and directing, although some criticized the pacing.

== Plot ==
=== 1980 ===
Hays (Mahershala Ali) and West (Stephen Dorff) visit a Catholic church to question the priest (Seth Barrish) about Will. The priest took the pictures of the first communicants but Will was the only one with his eyes closed, something that he attributes as just a mistake. He also states that Will and Julie talked about meeting their aunt, which makes no sense as they didn't have an aunt. Before they leave, he reports that the chaff dolls are made by a female parishioner.

They visit the parishioner, who says that a black man with a milky eye bought dolls at a recent fair, saying they were for his nieces and nephews. Identifying the man as Sam Whitehead (John Earl Jelks), they visit his house. Whitehead claims not to know anything about the dolls and does not help them at all. As the neighbors turn hostile and approach them, they force him into his house to interrogate him. Whitehead confesses to attending a Presbyterian church, not the Catholic one. They are forced to leave, with the neighbors shattering the glass on their car. That night, Hays goes on a date with Amelia (Carmen Ejogo) while West picks up Tom (Scoot McNairy) from a bar incident.

The task force managed to find a fingerprint in Will's bicycle, belonging to Freddy Burns (Rhys Wakefield). Hays and West pressure Freddy to confess anything, threatening that he could face prison rape, prompting him to cry. Meanwhile, Amelia visits Lucy (Mamie Gummer) to hand her the kids' school projects. During their conversation, she claims to have done bad things and becomes mad when Amelia suggests she should talk to Hays.

In the outskirts, Brett Woodard (Michael Greyeyes) talks to some children near the road, an encounter that is seen in the distance by an angry civilian. As more people approach him in their cars, he runs back to his house. He takes out some rifles, which he spreads throughout the house and also installs tripwires and Claymore mines as the men arrive at his house, all armed with guns. Hays and West are called to the house, just as a man slams the door open, with a mine behind it.

=== 1990 ===
Tensions remain between Hays and Amelia amidst the investigation on Julie's re-appearance, which extends into confronting their own personal problems.

West and Hays meet with Kindt (Brett Cullen), who is now the Arkansas Attorney General. He wants to play by his rules and not compromise their investigation. Their investigation includes the revelation that Lucy died of a drug overdose in Las Vegas two years ago. West and Hays then visit a technician to see the footage of the robbery. Hays watches the footage and is astounded to confirm that Julie (Bea Santos) is in fact the girl in the cameras.

=== 2015 ===
Hays visits the police department, where Henry (Ray Fisher) works. He asks for his help in finding more about the new evidence, including finding West. He then visits Elisa (Sarah Gadon) at her motel room, to ask for more information on her discovery. She shows him a photograph of the skeleton of Dan O'Brien, who went missing around 1987.

Back at his house, Hays tries to remember the full details of the events. During this, hallucinations of Viet Cong and American soldiers appear behind him. He is further disturbed when he sees a car parked outside his house, seemingly watching him.

== Production ==
=== Development ===
In March 2017, development on the third season started, with David Milch joining as a writer. Nic Pizzolatto and Milch were introduced with the help of executive producer Scott Stephens, who worked with Milch in Deadwood. In return for helping writing, Pizzolatto helped in writing Deadwood: The Movie.

In August 2017, it was announced that Pizzolatto would make his directorial debut in the season. According to Pizzolatto, he felt more relaxed while directing than serving his duties as showrunner, explaining "I knew what we were getting. I'm editing in my head. I have a direct line with the actors, a direct line with the camera crew, and so in that way, it really just made things easier."

In January 2019, the episode's title was revealed as "The Hour and the Day" and it was announced that series creator Nic Pizzolatto and David Milch had written the episode while Pizzolatto had directed it. This was Pizzolatto's twentieth writing credit, Milch's first writing credit, and Pizzolatto's first directing credit.

== Reception ==
=== Viewers ===
The episode was watched by 1.45 million viewers, earning a 0.4 in the 18-49 rating demographics on the Nielson ratings scale. This means that 0.4 percent of all households with televisions watched the episode. This was a 36% increase from the previous episode, which was watched by 1.06 million viewers with a 0.3 in the 18-49 demographics.

=== Critical reviews ===
"The Hour and the Day" received generally positive reviews from critics. The review aggregator website Rotten Tomatoes reported a 69% approval rating for the episode, based on 13 reviews, with an average rating of 7.5/10. The site's consensus states: "True Detective's halfway mark is a slow burn that culminates in a big kaboom, littered throughout with intriguing clues and unnerving ghosts from Wayne Hayes' past."

Emily L. Stephens of The A.V. Club gave the episode a "B−" grade and wrote, "Television tries to sell us unlikeable, difficult, bigoted men all the time. The cops of The Wire boast chasms of emotional and ethical emptiness. Tony Soprano throws around slurs like those slices of capicola he's always poking into his maw, and so do his capos. But Tom Purcell does something different, and Scott McNairy, that inhabitor, makes every word of Tom's remorse eloquent. It's too easy, too simple, but it's a glimpse of change, and of remorse, as something within reach."

Sean T. Collins of Rolling Stone wrote, "The preceding hour-plus of television wasn't explosive per se. Co-written by Nic Pizzolatto and David Deadwood Milch, with the former making his directorial debut, it's simply another well-written procedural, funny where it wants to be — and ugly where it needs to be." Lanre Bakare of The Guardian wrote, "We're four episodes in and the third outing of True Detective has settled into its rhythm. Is it working? Well, it's an improvement on season two. The plot makes sense; it has returned, appealingly, to the southern gothic of the first outing, and its stars are actually able to deliver their lines. But I'm not sure it will meet that first season's heady level of quality. It is much more conservative in its ambitions, with a storyline that has lost its existential layer, and which instead relies on the well-worn Satanic Panic narratives of 80s America." Ben Travers of IndieWire gave the episode a "B+" grade and wrote, "He's got his own damage to deal with, but that's not an excuse to take it out on others. That Pizzolatto recognizes this is a step forward; he's taking criticism and turning it into a strength. So far, Season 3 has done this fairly consistently overall, and now that we're halfway through, it's safer than ever to start looking forward to some real answers in the weeks to come."

Derek Lawrence of Entertainment Weekly wrote, "So far True Detective season 3 has been considered a solid bounce back from the poorly-received season 2, but the latest episode has to go down as a disappointment. Creator Nic Pizzolatto wrote 'The Hour and the Day' with Deadwood mastermind David Milch, probably the second best addition to the show behind Mahershala Ali. But the episode doesn't live up to the expectations and instead spins its wheels until an explosive ending." Amy Glynn of Paste gave the episode an 8.7 out of 10 and wrote, "The actual story points in this episode, most of which take place in 1980, are almost not the point; they're a vehicle, and they could be different story points without it changing the real substance of the episode, much of which is about people's different ways of dealing with race tensions, and nearly all of which is in rich pas de deux exchanges."

Keith Phipps of Vulture gave the episode a 3 star rating out of 5 and wrote, "Mahershala Ali is doing a lot while saying little in season three of True Detective, which reaches its midpoint with this fourth episode, even though the end of the mystery still appears to be nowhere in sight." Tony Sokol of Den of Geek gave the episode a 4.5 star rating out of 5 and wrote, "True Detective's halfway point is completely compelling. While we know we're going to see how this cliffhanger is going to play out, we don't know how long, given the three timeliness, we're going to have to wait. 'The Hour and the Day' does a wonderful job of testing our impatience."

Scott Tobias of The New York Times wrote, "Now it has run completely aground. Developments in the case are so slow-moving and diffuse that it's hard to keep track of them, and most of them are probably red herrings anyway. Dead ends are to be expected in the middle of an eight-hour whodunit, but that doesn't absolve the series's creator, Nic Pizzolatto, from the responsibility to keep plugging away. It's not just the detectives in 'The Hour and the Day' who are losing their sense of direction — it's as if the show itself had unscrewed the cap on a bottle of Jack Daniels and gone for a swim. Maybe it will wake from its stupor and start working the case again, but for now it's passed out on the couch. And it's dreaming about the Viet Cong."
