= Film industry in Louisiana =

Overview of the film industry in the U.S. state of Louisiana

The film industry in Louisiana has grown dramatically in recent years largely due to the state's 2002 tax incentives aimed at attracting film and television companies. The success of Louisiana's film industry caused the state to be nicknamed "Hollywood South" or "Hollywood on the Bayou".

In 2013, by some measures the film and television production in Louisiana exceeded that of California for the first time.

== History ==
=== 19th century ===
Film-making in Louisiana began in 1898 with the American Mutoscope and Biograph Company.

=== 20th century ===
It has been the site of several notable productions over the years, the first of which was Tarzan of the Apes, completed in 1918. Other early film productions include Jezebel, A Streetcar Named Desire, Easy Rider, Live and Let Die, and The Big Easy.

Louisiana has hosted a long list of major film and television stars over the years whose reputations and talents have likely played a role in the rise of state's film industry. Some of these actors and actresses include Bette Davis, Henry Fonda, Paul Newman, Marlon Brando, Denzel Washington, John Wayne, Clint Eastwood, Julia Roberts, Dennis Hopper, Cicely Tyson, Elvis Presley, Dennis Quaid, John Goodman, Jessica Lange, Richard Pryor, Jackie Gleason, James Spader, Dolly Parton, Susan Sarandon, Tommy Lee Jones, Kevin Costner, Tom Cruise, Alec Baldwin, Yul Brenner, David Niven, Jimmy Stewart, James Mason, Brad Pitt, Charles Bronson, and Daryl Hannah.

=== 21st century ===
In 2002, Louisiana passed unique tax incentives aimed at recruiting film and television productions to the state.

In 2010, boosted by its film industry, Louisiana made its first appearance in Site Selection's Top Business Climate rankings.

By 2011, the state's skilled crew base had grown by over 400 percent, and since 2006 over 300 films have been shot in Louisiana. The industry truly entered the national spotlight though when The Curious Case of Benjamin Button earned thirteen Oscar nominations, the most in 2009.

In 2011, Louisiana hosted more than 150 productions and about $1.3 billion of their combined $1.9 billion in budgets was spent in the state.

== Tax incentives ==
On July 1, 2002, the Louisiana Legislature enacted the Louisiana Motion Picture Tax Incentive Act. This tax credit has two primary components. First, the Investor Tax Credit provides a 30% tax credit on qualified motion picture expenditures with no project or program cap. Second, the Labor Tax Credit provides a 5% credit for payroll expenditures on Louisiana residents. This program not only encourages residents to film in Louisiana but also employ Louisiana residents. To qualify for this program, filmmakers must spend at least $300,000 in Louisiana.

== Climate and scenery ==
Louisiana's warm weather and diverse locations have appealed to film producers across the country considering that the subtropical climate makes filming possible year-round without interruptions. The spring and fall months are considered ideal filming time, with October being the driest month. In terms of scenery, Louisiana offers swamps and cypress trees, public and private college campuses, antebellum plantations, and urban environments. These diverse locations are often credited for Louisiana's ability to stand in as multiple settings such as Texas, Colorado, Utah, Washington, DC, and London. As Patrick Lussier, director of Drive Angry 3D, commented in USA Today, "The film industry wants to find places it can reinvent and make look like anything it needs. There's a lot of opportunity [to] do that in Louisiana." The film industry’s emergence in the Pelican State has also bolstered the hiring of local talent for Louisiana casting calls and auditions, especially in New Orleans.

== Current film and television projects ==
1. Bad Girls Club Season 7, (television series)
2. Killing Them Softly (feature film)
3. Ender's Game (feature film)
4. The Fishies (television series)
5. Ghostbreakers (television series)
6. The Host (feature film)
7. Super (feature film)
8. Hound Dogs (television series)
9. Looper (feature film)
10. Oblivion (feature film)
11. On the Road (feature film)
12. Rook (feature film)
13. Seven Below Zero (feature film)
14. Tarantula (feature film)
15. Treme Season 2 (television series)
16. True Blood (television series)
17. Universal Soldier: A New Dimension (feature film)
18. Lisa Frankenstein (feature film)
19. Hitman (feature film)
20. Parish (feature film)
