= Site Selection =

Magazine

Site Selection magazine, published by Conway Data, Inc., is the official publication of the Industrial Asset Management Council (IAMC). The magazine delivers expansion planning information to over 44,000 readers including corporate executives, site selection consultants, and real estate professionals. Site Selection is available in a bimonthly print magazine, or on their website. The magazine is headquartered in Norcross, Georgia.

== History ==
Site Selection was founded as Manufacturers Record, then based in Baltimore, Maryland, in 1883. It was the top business journal of its day, with information about new plants and business expansions well into the 20th century.

During the 1950s, McKinley Conway purchased Manufacturers Record from the founder and merged it with his Industrial Development and Site Selection, which subsequently became Site Selection.

== Circulation ==
Site Selection has an audited circulation of approximately 45,000 corporate decision-makers:
• More than 44,000 c-suite manufacturing and corporate real estate executives;
• More than 2,500 government development agencies;
• Decision makers from more than 800 of the Fortune 1000 companies;
• More than 630 facility managers;
• More than 500 site consultants;
• Executives with more than 100 utilities;
• Representing more than 80 countries.

Statistical information includes audited circulation and the publisher's own data.

== Awards ==
Site Selection has received multiple awards from the Magazine Association of the Southeast (MAGS), including the MAGS GAMMA Gold Award for Best Business to Business Publication, MAGS GAMMA Gold Award for Best Magazine Website, and the MAGS GAMMA Silver Award for Best Single Issue.

Site Selection has also received several Awards for Publication Excellence (APEX) in business communications, including the 2007 Apex Award of Excellence in the category of E-Mail Newsletters (SiteNet Dispatch) and the 2007 Apex Award of Excellence in the category of Magazines & Journals Over 32 pg.
