= Rust Cohle =

Fictional detective

- True Detective character
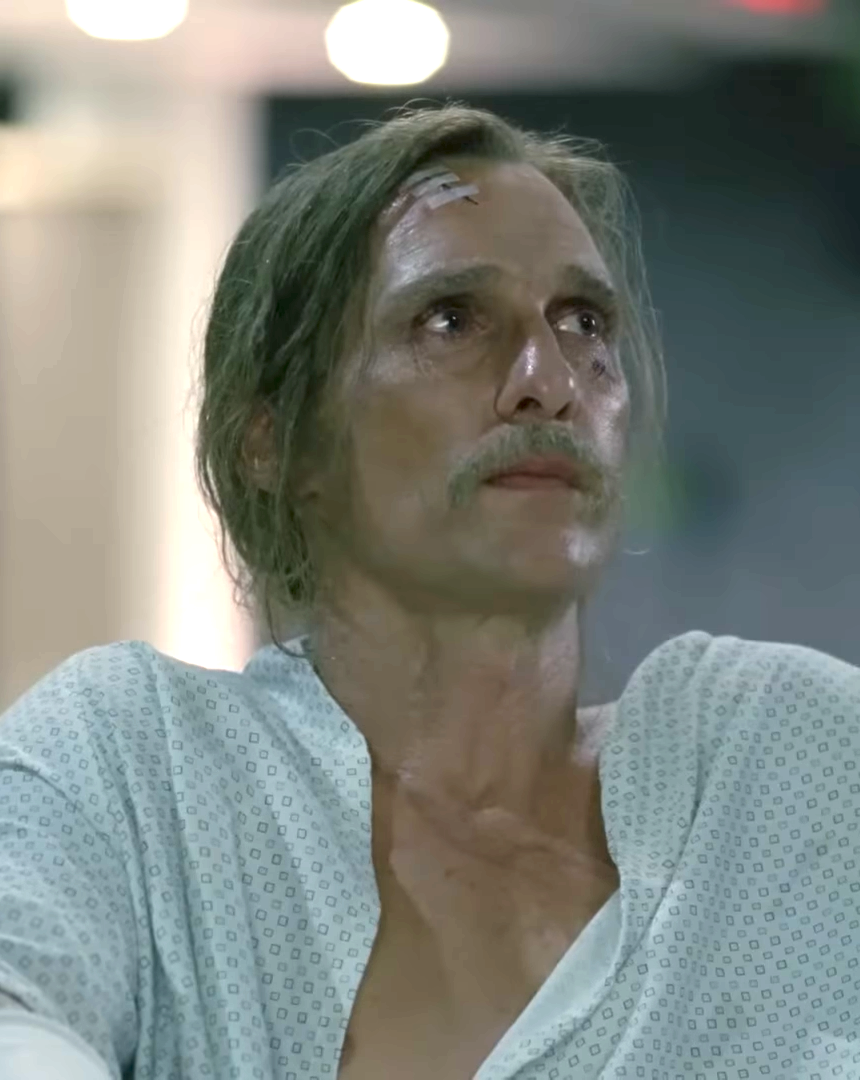
- Cohle as portrayed by Matthew McConaughey in "Form and Void"
- First appearance: "The Long Bright Dark" (2014)
- Last appearance: "Form and Void" (2014)
- Created by: Nic Pizzolatto
- Portrayed by: Matthew McConaughey

In-universe information
- Full name: Rustin Spencer Cohle
- Nicknames: Rust; Rusty; Crash; The Taxman
- Gender: Male
- Occupation: Police officer Detective; Fisherman; Bartender; Private investigator
- Affiliation: Houston Police Department (1980s–1994); Louisiana State Police (1994–2002); Hart Investigative Solutions (2012)
- Family: Travis Cohle (father; deceased); Sophia Cohle (daughter; deceased)
- Significant others: Claire Cohle (ex-wife); Laurie Spencer (ex-girlfriend)
- Nationality: American

Rustin Spencer "Rust" Cohle is a fictional character portrayed by Matthew McConaughey in the first season of HBO's anthology television series True Detective. He works as a homicide detective for the Louisiana State Police (LSP) alongside his partner Marty Hart, portrayed by Woody Harrelson. The season follows Cohle and Hart's hunt for a serial killer in Louisiana across 17 years.

The character of Rust Cohle and Matthew McConaughey's performance have gained unanimous acclaim. McConaughey received a Critics' Choice Television Award, in addition to nominations for an Actor Award, a Golden Globe Award, and a Primetime Emmy Award for his performance.

== Character overview ==
Cohle is introduced as a gifted, intelligent but isolated detective who has recently transferred to the Louisiana State Police's CID section. A solitary cynic, he is deeply troubled from his time on the job and has developed nihilistic and pessimistic world views. Amongst these are the view that human beings are merely "sentient meat" and that human consciousness was an evolutionary mistake. Rust has no social life and lives for his job. He lives sparingly, avoids interacting with his colleagues, including his partner Marty where possible, and spends his free time obsessing over crime details, reading criminology material, and hoarding evidence. His habit of taking extensive notes in a large ledger earns him the derisive nickname "The Taxman" among his colleagues. Despite his cold relationship with many of his colleagues, he is generally accepted to be an expert interrogator and one of the LSP's leading detectives. He is a heavy cigarette smoker, with his brand of choice being Camel.

Cohle's backstory is gradually revealed to the viewer in real time. Born in Texas, Cohle is raised in Alaska by his father, Travis, a survivalist Vietnam veteran and divorcee. He has not seen his mother since he was a child. Rust eventually moved back to Texas, claiming to dislike the Alaskan cold, and joined the Houston Police Department. There, he rose to become a detective in the robbery squad and married a woman named Clare, with whom he had a daughter named Sophia. Sometime during the mid-to-late 1980s, Sophia was hit by a car and killed; a tragedy that destroyed his marriage and kick-started his alcoholism. The loss of his daughter led Cohle to become increasingly unstable, resulting in him executing a crystal meth user who had injected his child with the drug.

In order to avoid imprisonment, Cohle's superiors cut him a deal in which he was transferred to work as an undercover narcotics detective in a High Intensity Drug Trafficking Area (HIDTA), which he did for four years. Cohle notes that this was over four times as long as most undercover detectives are kept in rotation. During this assignment, Cohle became addicted to drugs, continuing to use substances such as qualudes to enable him to sleep well into the 2000s. As a result of his time in the unit, Rust also developed synesthesia and problems with visceral hallucinations.

Whilst on assignment with the Iron Crusaders, a Texas biker gang, Rust killed three members of a cartel in a shootout at the Port of Houston, while being shot multiple times himself. During his recovery, Rust was committed to the Lubbock psychiatric hospital and was offered retirement on a full medical discharge pension due to psychiatric trauma. Instead, Rust requested a transfer into any available homicide unit, resulting in his transfer to Louisiana.

The series takes place in two time periods: 1995–2002, in which Cohle and his CID partner Martin Hart work together to find the killer; and 2012, when Cohle, who has by now quit the state police and fallen deeper into alcoholism, submits to an interview with LSP detectives Maynard Gilbough and Thomas Papania regarding the murders. Cohle sees through the detectives, and realizes that they think he is the killer. He uses the interview to find out what information the detectives have on him and the case.

== Character arc ==
=== The Dora Lange murder ===
On January 3, 1995, LSP CID detectives Cohle and Hart are assigned to assist the Vermilion Parish Sheriffs' Department with a ritualistic murder in rural Erath. They discover that the killer raped and tortured the victim, a prostitute named Dora Lange, and subsequently attached a pair of deer antlers to her head, painted a spiraling vortex on her back, and posed her underneath a tree in a burnt sugarcane field. They also discover strange stick structures that appear occult in nature. Believing the crime scene to be too elaborate, Cohle deduces the murder to be the work of a serial killer. The murder becomes a media sensation, leading to the intervention of Reverend Billy Lee Tuttle, a member of the influential Tuttle family and the cousin of Governor Edwin Tuttle, who attempts to establish an anti-Christian crimes task force. Cohle, a committed philosophical atheist, pessimistic nihilist and antinatalist, finds the suggestion ludicrous and discards it out of hand.

An aloof, unorthodox loner, Cohle finds himself ostracized by fellow detectives despite the support of the more personable Hart. During an invitation to Hart's house for dinner, Cohle arrives drunk. Marty later learns that it is the anniversary of Cohle's daughter's death, a topic he has never discussed with the rest of the force.

Cohle begins to interview prostitutes working Louisiana truck stops who may have known Lange, purchasing barbiturates from one in an attempt to combat his insomnia. He learns of a rural brothel in Vermilion Parish called the Ranch, and assaults some local johns in order to uncover its location. At the Ranch, Cohle and Hart gain access to Lange's diary, which contains repeated references to "Carcosa" and a "Yellow King". In the wreckage of a burnt-out church Lange attended, they find more structures and a painting on the wall depicting a human figure wearing antlers.

=== Children in the woods ===
Over the next three months, Cohle and Hart work the Lange murder with varying success. Through Dora's ex-husband Charlie, an inmate at Avoyelles prison, they identify former cellmate Reggie Ledoux as a prime suspect. Ledoux manufactures crystal meth for an East Texas-based outlaw motorcycle club called the Iron Crusaders, whom Cohle has a history with from his time undercover. Rust resurrects his undercover identity of 'Crash' and steals cocaine from the evidence lockup, enabling him to pose as a front man for a fake cartel consisting of former members of the Mexican Army. To protect his cover, he reluctantly agrees to assist a group of them in a home invasion so the ringleader, Ginger, will lead them to Ledoux. Accompanied by Cohle, the bikers poorly disguise themselves as police officers and attempt to rob a drug house in an African American housing project, which results in a shootout leaving several people dead.

During the robbery, Cohle takes Ginger hostage and forces him to set a meeting with Reggie's cousin and partner, Dewall. Dewall refuses Cohle's fake business offer and threatens to kill him if they were to cross paths again. Hart follows Dewall to their rural meth lab in the swamp and calls Cohle to provide the location. Hart and Cohle methodically search the property while side stepping various booby traps. When Hart discovers that the Ledoux partners have kidnapped and abused two children, a boy and a girl, he executes Reggie in a fit of rage. Dewall is killed after he flees and blows up on one of his own explosive booby traps. Cohle stages evidence to support the story that Reggie opened fire on them with an AK-47 assault rifle, forcing Hart to kill him in self-defense. Afterwards the two are hailed as heroes, and receive commendations and promotions. Of the two children only the girl was rescued alive.

=== The Yellow King ===
Over the next seven years, Cohle dates a medical doctor, Laurie, introduced to him by Maggie, Hart's wife. He and Hart remain partners and continue to work various cases; Cohle becomes renowned locally as an ace interrogator. In 2002, Cohle ends his relationship with Laurie. When he assists a local jurisdiction with a double homicide investigation, the suspect reveals that Reggie and Dewall did not act alone. He tells Cohle that he will give them information about the "Yellow King" in return for a plea deal. Cohle wants to investigate this lead further, but the suspect suspiciously commits suicide in his cell that night after receiving a phone call from a payphone.

Cohle becomes obsessed with reopening the case and pursues several leads, including a private Christian school run by Billy Lee Tuttle that had been closed amid rumors of child sexual abuse. He also visits the Ledouxs' surviving victim, now institutionalized with catatonia, who tells Rust about a third attacker, and begins screaming when Cohle asks her about the man's apparently scarred face. Tuttle complains to Cohle's superiors, who suspend Cohle and order him to leave the case closed. That night, Maggie arrives unexpectedly at Cohle's apartment and seduces him as revenge for Hart's infidelity. Hart finds out and gets into a fistfight with Cohle in front of the entire department. Cohle quits the force the same day, and becomes a drifter and an alcoholic. He initially returns to Alaska and supports himself as a fisherman. Upon his return to Louisiana in 2010, he works as a part-time bartender.

In 2012, a murder similar to the Lange case from 1995 occurs and Cohle is seen in the vicinity of the body, arousing the suspicion of LSP detectives Gilbough and Papania. They believe that Cohle may have been the killer in 1995 because he led Hart to every break in the case and seemed to know everything about the killer's frame of mind. They interview Cohle and Hart, who both refuse to cooperate once the purpose of the interview becomes clear.

Cohle meets with Hart, who has also quit state CID and runs his own private investigation firm; he tells him that he has found evidence leading to the killer. Hart is skeptical and still resentful, but Cohle convinces him to help with the investigation by showing him a videotape he stole from Tuttle's home. The video is over twenty years old, and shows numerous masked men abusing and killing Marie Fontenot, a missing child whose name had come up in their investigation seventeen years prior. Cohle and Hart track down the original case's chief investigating officer, Sheriff Steve Geraci, and interrogate him at gunpoint. Geraci tells them that his superior, the late Sheriff Ted Childress, ordered him to halt the investigation; Childress was one of Tuttle's relatives. They soon discover that the Tuttle and Childress families—to whom both Reggie and Dewall Ledoux belong—are related, and have long histories of child abuse and murder. They ultimately discover that the killer is a Childress, and go to a relative of the late sheriff's home to investigate.

=== Carcosa ===
Cohle and Hart travel to the Childress house, where they find that Errol, the son of Billy Lee Childress, a relative of Sheriff Ted Childress, is the killer. They discover the remains of his father tied up in a shed. They also encounter Betty Childress, his intellectually disabled half-sister, with whom he is having an incestuous relationship. Cohle pursues Childress into the catacombs behind the house, which Childress identifies as "Carcosa". Cohle discovers an idol draped in yellow and covered in skulls—the "Yellow King"—and has a hallucination of a spiraling vortex, the same symbol that had been drawn on Lange and many of the other victims. Childress attacks Cohle and stabs him in the abdomen with a large knife. Hart arrives and engages Childress, who attacks him with an axe; Cohle saves his partner by shooting Childress in the head, killing him. Gilbough and Papania, whom Hart had called, arrive at the scene. Additionally, Cohle and Hart's full investigation evidence is mailed to various media and law enforcement agencies across the country. Numerous bodies and other evidence connected to missing persons are found on the Childress property, including Dora Lange's.

Recovering in the hospital, Cohle falls into a coma for a number of days. After he wakes, Cohle informs Hart that while in the coma he felt the loving presence of his deceased father and daughter. Cohle leaves the hospital with Hart and looks up at the night sky, telling his partner, "Once there was only dark. If you ask me, the light's winning."

== Awards and nominations ==
McConaughey received critical acclaim for his portrayal of Cohle, and has won and been nominated for several awards, including:

- TCA Award for Individual Achievement in Drama (Won)
- Critics' Choice Television Award for Best Actor in a Drama Series (Won)
- Golden Globe Award for Best Actor – Miniseries or Television Film (Nominated)
- Primetime Emmy Award for Outstanding Lead Actor in a Drama Series (Nominated)
- Actor Award for Outstanding Performance by a Male Actor in a Drama Series (Nominated)

== See also ==
- List of fictional atheists and agnostics
- "An Inhabitant of Carcosa", an 1886 short story by Ambrose Bierce
- The Conspiracy Against the Human Race, an American non-fiction book
