= True Detective =

American anthology crime drama TV series

- Season 1 title card
- Also known as: True Detective: Night Country (season 4)
- Genre: Anthology; Crime drama; Detective; Mystery-thriller; Neo-noir; Southern Gothic
- Created by: Nic Pizzolatto (s. 1–3); Issa López (s. 4–5)
- Based on: True Detective by Nic Pizzolatto (s. 4)
- Showrunners: Nic Pizzolatto (s. 1–3); Issa López (s. 4–5)
- Directed by: Cary Joji Fukunaga (s. 1); Various (s. 2–3); Issa López (s. 4)
- Starring: Season 1: Matthew McConaughey; Woody Harrelson; Michelle Monaghan; Michael Potts; Tory Kittles; Season 2: Colin Farrell; Rachel McAdams; Taylor Kitsch; Kelly Reilly; Vince Vaughn; Season 3: Mahershala Ali; Carmen Ejogo; Stephen Dorff; Scoot McNairy; Ray Fisher; Season 4: Jodie Foster; Kali Reis; Fiona Shaw; Finn Bennett; Isabella Star LaBlanc; John Hawkes; Christopher Eccleston; Season 5: Nicolas Cage; Antonio Banderas
- Opening theme: "Far from Any Road" by the Handsome Family (s. 1); "Nevermind" by Leonard Cohen (s. 2); "Death Letter" by Cassandra Wilson (s. 3); "Bury a Friend" by Billie Eilish (s. 4)
- Composers: T Bone Burnett (s. 1–3); Vince Pope (s. 4)
- Country of origin: United States
- Original language: English
- No. of seasons: 4
- No. of episodes: 30 (list of episodes)

Production
- Executive producers: Nic Pizzolatto; Cary Joji Fukunaga; Scott Stephens (s. 1–3); Matthew McConaughey; Woody Harrelson; Steve Golin (s. 1–3); Richard Brown; Daniel Sackheim (s. 3); Jeremy Saulnier (s. 3); Bard Dorros (s. 3); Chris Mundy (s. 4); Barry Jenkins (s. 4); Adele Romanski (s. 4); Mark Ceryan (s. 4); Alan Page Arriaga (s. 4); Jodie Foster (s. 4); Mari-Jo Winkler-Ioffreda (s. 4-5); Issa López (s. 4–5)
- Producers: Carol Cuddy (s. 1); Aida Rodgers (s. 2); Peter Feldman (s. 3); Sam Breckman (s. 4); Princess Daazhraii Johnson (s. 4); Cathy Tagnak Rexford (s. 4); Layla Blackman (s. 4)
- Production locations: Louisiana (s. 1); California (s. 2); Arkansas (s. 3); Iceland (s. 4); New York (s. 5)
- Cinematography: Adam Arkapaw (s. 1); Nigel Bluck (s. 2–3); Germain McMicking (s. 3); Florian Hoffmeister (s. 4)
- Editors: Alex Hall (s. 1–2); Affonso Gonçalves (s. 1); Meg Ritcher (s. 1); Chris Fiegler (s. 2); Byron Smith (s. 2); Leo Trombetta (s. 3); Matt Chessé (s. 4)
- Running time: 54–87 minutes
- Production companies: Parliament of Owls; Passenger; Anonymous Content; Neon Black; Lee Caplin / Picture Entertainment (s. 1–3); Peligrosa (s. 4); HBO Entertainment

Original release
- Network: HBO
- Release: January 12, 2014 – present

True Detective is an American anthology crime drama television series created by Nic Pizzolatto for the premium cable network HBO. The series premiered on January 12, 2014, and each season of the series is structured as a self-contained narrative, employing new cast ensembles, and following various sets of characters and settings.

The first season, starring Matthew McConaughey, Woody Harrelson, Michelle Monaghan, Michael Potts, and Tory Kittles, aired in 2014. It takes place in Louisiana and follows a pair of Louisiana State Police detectives, and their pursuit of a serial killer with occult links over a 17-year period.

The second season, starring Colin Farrell, Rachel McAdams, Taylor Kitsch, Kelly Reilly, and Vince Vaughn, aired in 2015. It is set in California, and focuses on three detectives from three cooperating police jurisdictions and a criminal-turned-businessman as they investigate a series of crimes they believe are linked to the murder of a corrupt politician.

The third season, starring Mahershala Ali, Carmen Ejogo, Stephen Dorff, Scoot McNairy, and Ray Fisher, aired in 2019. It takes place in the Ozarks over three time periods as a pair of Arkansas State Police detectives investigate a macabre crime involving two missing children.

The fourth season, subtitled Night Country and starring Jodie Foster and Kali Reis, aired in 2024. It takes place in Alaska and follows the investigation into the sudden disappearance of a team of eight men from a research station. Issa López serves as creator, writer, and director, marking Pizzolatto's first time as neither writer nor showrunner.

A fifth season, with López returning as showrunner, is in development. Casting and pre-production were set to start in 2025 with a scheduled air date in 2027. In August 2025, it was reported that Nicolas Cage was in talks to star in season 5. In October 2026, Cage was officially announced to star as Henry Logan, with Antonio Banderas also starring as Rai García. The season will take place in Jamaica Bay. Production is set to begin in 2027.

The first season received widespread acclaim and earned high ratings for HBO. It received numerous awards, chiefly for its acting, cinematography, writing, and direction. Reception to the second season was more divided, although the show maintained high viewership. The third season received positive reviews, but saw a drop in viewership. The fourth season, Night Country, is the most watched of the series, and received widespread critical acclaim. It earned the highest number of Emmy Award nominations for the series.

== Production ==
=== Development ===
Before developing True Detective, Nic Pizzolatto taught at the University of Chicago, the University of North Carolina at Chapel Hill, and DePauw University. His first significant published work was a short story collection released as Between Here and the Yellow Sea in 2006. After publishing the novel Galveston in 2010, Pizzolatto began concentrating on television writing.

Pizzolatto originally conceived True Detective as the narrative successor to Galveston, but once the project matured, he believed the story's shift in perspective and time made it more suitable for television. The author pitched an adaptation of Galveston to entice studio executives, and drafted six screenplays from May to July 2010, including an early 90-page draft of the True Detective pilot script. A second script was written shortly after Pizzolatto's departure from The Killing, thanks to the support of Anonymous Content. By April 2012, HBO commissioned True Detective for an eight-episode season. Pizzolatto worked alone creating the definitive project script, which exceeded 500 pages. As an anthology series, each True Detective season follows a self-contained story, distinguished by distinct sets of characters, settings, and events with shared continuity.

When preparing season 4, subtitled Night Country, director and writer Issa López chose to create a "dark mirror" of the first season: "Where True Detective is male and it's sweaty, Night Country is cold and it's dark and it's female."

In February 2024, following the fourth-season finale, HBO renewed the series for a fifth season with López returning as showrunner. The fifth season, set in the Jamaica Bay area of New York City, is scheduled to be released in 2027.

=== Filming ===
Principal photography for True Detective season one took place in Louisiana, partly because the shoot qualified for the state's tax incentive program that subsidized the cost of production. Production lasted 100 consecutive days, and each episode was shot on 35mm film. The crew filmed exterior shots of various constructed sets, including a remote sugarcane field outside of Erath, in addition to real life locations such as Fort Macomb, a nineteenth-century fort located outside of New Orleans.

California was selected as the setting for True Detective's sophomore season. Producers were urged to avoid filming in Los Angeles and, instead, focus on the more obscure regions of the state to "capture a certain psycho-sphere ambiance". Production began in November 2014.

The third season was filmed at various locations throughout Northwest Arkansas, including Fayetteville, Bentonville, Lincoln, Rogers and Springdale. Filming began in February 2018 and was wrapped in August of the same year.

=== Opening sequence ===
Led by creative director Patrick Clair, True Detective's title sequences were developed by a collaborative team consisting of three motion-design studios: Santa Monica-based Elastic, Antibody and Breeder, both based in Australia. For the first season, Clair and his team took a variety of photos of the Louisiana scenery, which became the sequence's backbone. They superimposed these images onto low poly meshes, using various animation and special effects techniques. This was a meticulous process for production, since they wanted to avoid creating a digitized look for the sequence. Once its final cut took form, the team polished it by employing optical glitching and motion distortion technique. True Detective's season one opening theme is "Far from Any Road", an alternative country song originally composed by The Handsome Family for their 2003 album Singing Bones. The Sydney Morning Herald included season one's opening sequence in their list of the "Ten of the Best" title sequences on television.

Clair took a similar approach to creating the title sequence for True Detective's second season. Production used material from a number of photographers, including aerial shots captured by David Maisel. However, unlike season one, season two's title sequence incorporates deep, vivid gold and red color, thereby presenting "that more complicated view of California". Leonard Cohen's "Nevermind" is the season two opening theme, which is a song from Cohen's 2014 album Popular Problems. The theme song's lyrics change with every episode, incorporating different verses from Cohen's song.

For the fourth season, Night Country, a new sequence was commissioned from London-based Peter Anderson Studio, set to Billie Eilish's song "Bury a Friend", a major influence on the show cited by showrunner Issa López. As the fourth season sought to distinguish itself visually from prior entries, Anderson chose not to use superimposed images. Instead, the company was flown out to Iceland to film the majority of the sequence "from scratch", using the same props and locations as the show itself. Although certain scenes involved CGI (such as the final shot of a car parked on the sea ice) and underwater sequences were filmed in a tank, the majority of the sequence was real footage. This allowed Anderson to recreate the arc of the story in miniature, tantalizing the audience with the unfolding story: "[t]he setting is the same. But the story, packed inside a single minute, stands on its own."

== Cast and crew ==
=== Season 1 ===
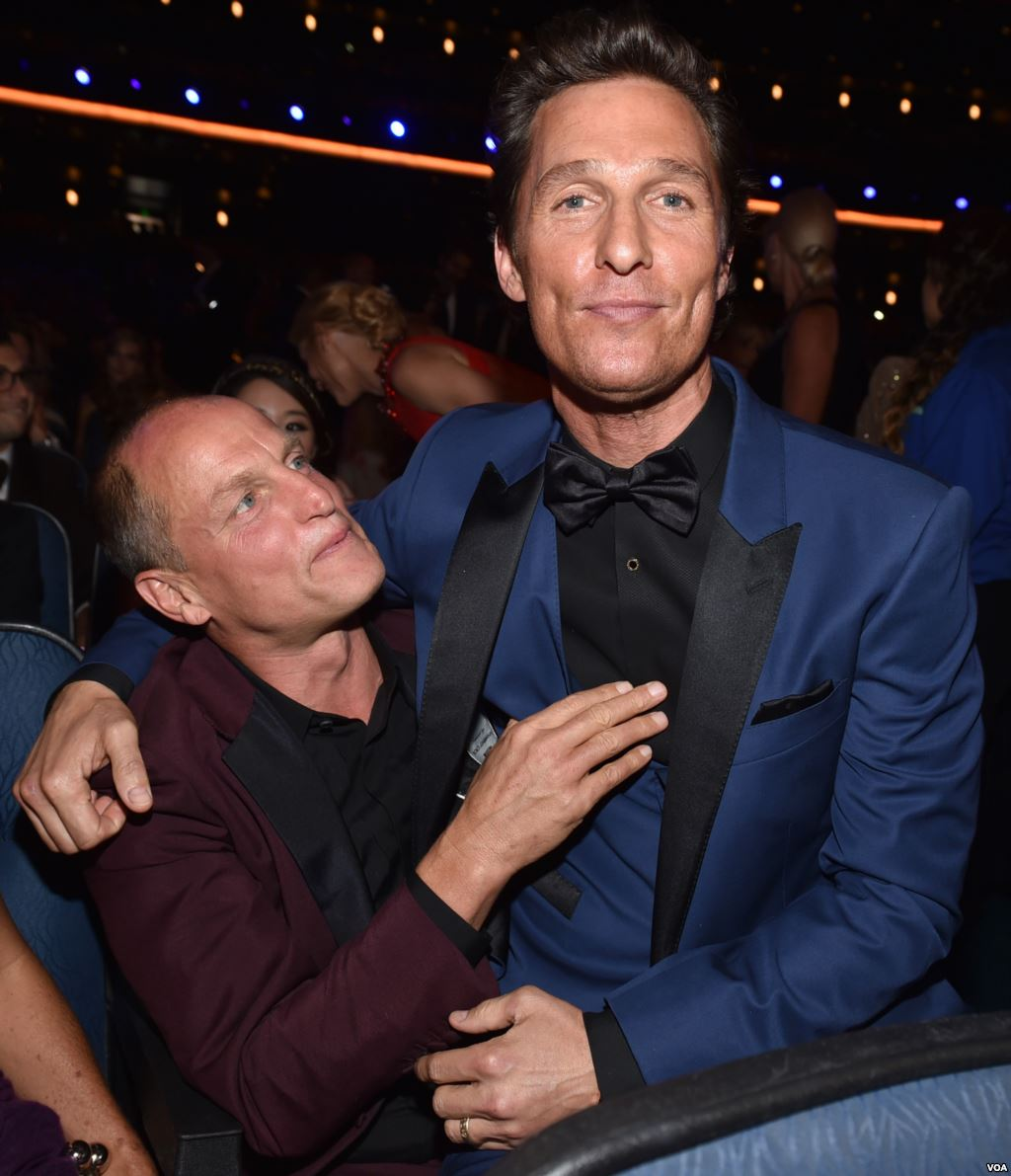
Harrelson (left) and McConaughey (right) at the 66th Primetime Emmy Awards

The first actor to be cast for True Detective was Matthew McConaughey, who acted as Detective Rustin "Rust" Cohle. McConaughey came to Pizzolatto's attention for his performance in the 2011 thriller film The Lincoln Lawyer, and was contracted before the series was commissioned by HBO. He and Woody Harrelson were among a pool of candidates Pizzolatto had in mind for star billing. Although McConaughey was to play Detective Martin "Marty" Hart, he later convinced Pizzolatto to cast him as Cohle. Instead, Harrelson was assigned the role of Hart at McConaughey's request. Michelle Monaghan played the female lead Maggie Hart, while Michael Potts and Tory Kittles were given the roles of Detectives Maynard Gilbough and Thomas Papania, respectively. Major recurring roles in the first season include Kevin Dunn as Major Ken Quesada and Alexandra Daddario as Lisa Tragnetti. Daddario appeared in a four-episode arc as a court reporter having an extramarital affair with one of the main characters; her nude scene with Woody Harrelson attracted much attention.

Cary Joji Fukunaga was appointed as director of True Detective's first season. He competed with Alejandro González Iñárritu for the position, but Iñárritu dropped out because of other film commitments. To prepare, Fukunaga conducted research with a real-life homicide detective of the Louisiana State Police's Criminal Investigations Division. The director brought on Adam Arkapaw as the project cinematographer, and hired Alex DiGerlando, who he worked with on Benh Zeitlin's Glory at Sea (2008), as the production designer.

=== Season 2 ===
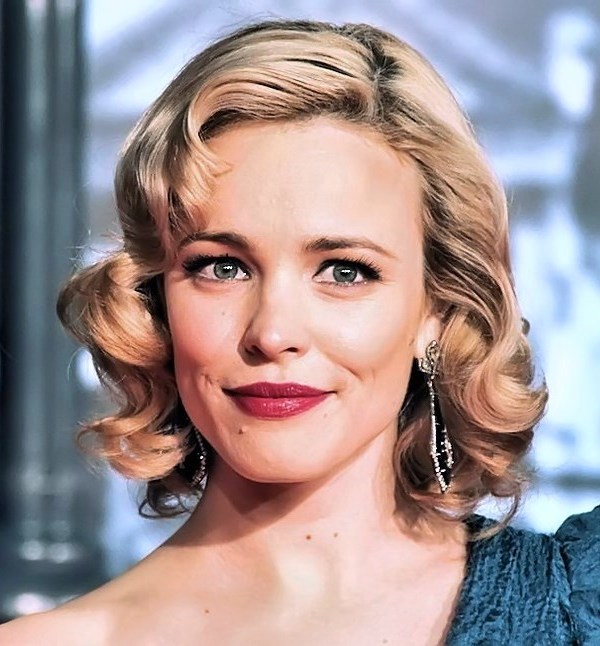
Rachel McAdams is a lead in season 2.

In January 2014, Pizzolatto signed a two-year contract extension with HBO, effectively renewing the series for two additional seasons. Much like its predecessor, season 2 of True Detective consists of eight episodes, all written by Pizzolatto. However, the responsibility of directing was assigned to several people. Justin Lin directed the first two episodes. Fukunaga, who directed all of season one, did not return as director; he remains, however, an executive producer, as do McConaughey and Harrelson. Pizzolatto hired fellow novelist Scott Lasser to help develop and write stories for the second half of the season.

The season's first significant casting was Colin Farrell as Detective Raymond "Ray" Velcoro. Vince Vaughn, playing the role of criminal and entrepreneur Frank Semyon, was officially cast toward the end of the month. By November, True Detective's principal cast expanded to include Rachel McAdams as Detective Antigone "Ani" Bezzerides, Taylor Kitsch as California Highway Patrol Officer Paul Woodrugh, and Kelly Reilly as Jordan Semyon, Frank's wife.

=== Season 3 ===
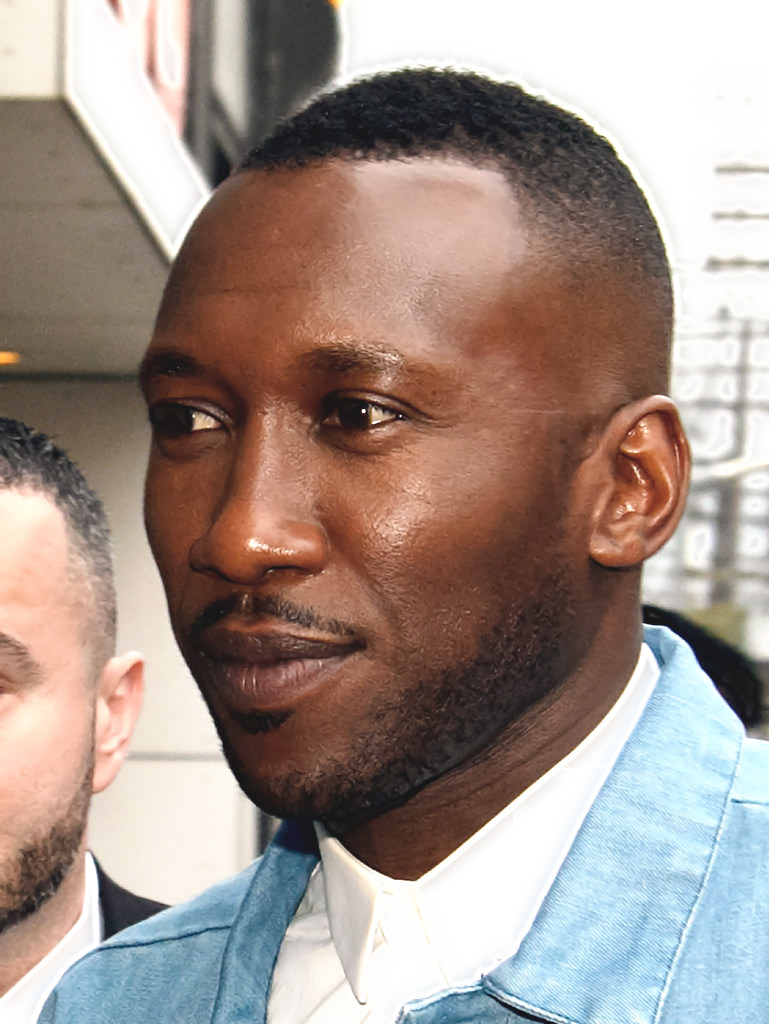
Mahershala Ali plays the lead role in the third season.

In August 2017, HBO officially greenlit a third season, which takes place in the Ozarks over three decades. The first two episodes were directed by Jeremy Saulnier; he had been expected to direct the third episode, but had to exit the series due to scheduling conflicts. In March 2018, it was announced that Daniel Sackheim was added as director and that he and Pizzolatto would direct the remaining six episodes. Pizzolatto is the sole writer, with the exceptions of episodes 4 and 6 which he co-wrote with David Milch and Graham Gordy, respectively. Mahershala Ali was cast as the lead character, playing Wayne Hays, a state police detective from northwest Arkansas. Ray Fisher plays Wayne's son, Henry Hays; Carmen Ejogo plays Amelia Reardon, an Arkansas schoolteacher with a connection to two missing children in 1980; Stephen Dorff plays Roland West, an Arkansas State Investigator; Scoot McNairy plays Tom Purcell, the father of the missing children; and Mamie Gummer plays Lucy Purcell, the mother of the missing children.

=== Season 4: Night Country ===
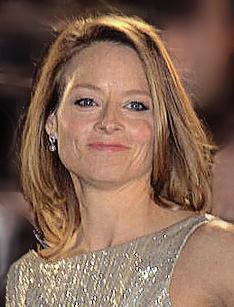
Jodie Foster stars in season 4.

In March 2022, it was reported that a fourth season of True Detective was in development, with Issa López writing a pilot episode and Barry Jenkins as executive producer. López would also direct the pilot if HBO moved forward with the project. In May 2022, it was reported that Jodie Foster would star in a lead role for the fourth season. The season, subtitled Night Country, is set in Alaska, and follows detectives Liz Danvers (Foster) and Evangeline Navarro as they investigate the disappearance of eight men from a research station. In June 2022, HBO officially greenlit the series and Kali Reis was cast in the lead role of Evangeline Navarro, a role that was originally conceived as Latina. The season was filmed in Iceland on an estimated budget of $60 million. In September 2022, John Hawkes, Christopher Eccleston, Fiona Shaw, Finn Bennett, and Anna Lambe joined the cast. Further cast additions were announced in October 2022, including Aka Niviâna, Isabella Star LaBlanc and Joel D. Montgrand, while also confirming that the new season would be the first not written by Pizzolatto, who will turn over primary writing and showrunning duties to López. HBO confirmed on November 8, 2022, that production on the fourth season had commenced. Producer Mari-Jo Winkler and writer-director Issa López both announced that filming had finished in early April 2023. The season premiered on January 14, 2024.

== Episodes ==
Season	Episodes	Originally released		Average viewers (in millions)
Season	Episodes	First released	Last released	Average viewers (in millions)
1	8	January 12, 2014	March 9, 2014	2.33
2	8	June 21, 2015	August 9, 2015	2.61
3	8	January 13, 2019	February 24, 2019	1.25
4	6	January 14, 2024	February 18, 2024	0.654

== Reception ==
=== Critical response ===
Critical response of True Detective
Season	Rotten Tomatoes	Metacritic
1	92% (100 reviews)	87 (41 reviews)
2	47% (126 reviews)	61 (41 reviews)
3	84% (110 reviews)	72 (35 reviews)
4	93% (210 reviews)	81 (48 reviews)

==== Season 1 ====
True Detective's first season received widespread acclaim from television critics, with several naming it among the best television dramas of the year. On the review aggregation website Rotten Tomatoes, the first season garnered a rating of 92%, based on 100 reviews. The site's critical consensus reads, "In True Detective, performances by Woody Harrelson and Matthew McConaughey reel the viewer in, while the style, vision and direction make it hard to turn away." On Metacritic, season one scored an 87 out of 100, based on 41 critics.

Reviewers from The Daily Beast, The Atlantic, and The Daily Telegraph cited True Detective as the strongest show in recent memory. Tim Goodman from The Hollywood Reporter said the acting, dialogue, and sleek production were the series' most redeeming qualities. HitFix's Alan Sepinwall agreed, and believed that these attributes "speak to the value of the hybrid anthology format Pizzolatto is using here ... points to a potentially fascinating shift in dramatic series television". Richard Lawson, writing for Vanity Fair, said that Pizzolatto and Fukunaga's sensibilities produce "a captivating and offbeat tweak of a well-worn genre". Despite its critical regard, some critics were not as enthusiastic in their reviews of season one. The New York Times journalist Mike Hale thought the script too readily deferred to religion as its narrative backbone, as did Chris Cabin from Slant Magazine. Hank Steuver of The Washington Post wrote that True Detective failed to realize its own ambition.

The ensemble performances, namely McConaughey and Harrelson, were frequently mentioned in reviews. Robert Bianco in USA Today wrote that the duo met, and even exceeded occasionally, the "enormously high" performance expectations of the "golden age of TV acting". David Wiegand of the San Francisco Chronicle and Los Angeles Times journalist Robert Lloyd singled out the two men for their work in the series; The Boston Globe did the same for Monaghan. Variety's Brian Lowry said the True Detective cast consisted of "fine players on the periphery".

==== Season 2 ====
True Detective's second season received mixed reviews. Praise was given to the performances of Farrell, McAdams and Kitsch, cinematography, and action sequences. However, many critics felt it was weaker than the first season. Most criticism focused on the convoluted plot and dialogue. On Rotten Tomatoes, the season has a rating of 47%, based on 126 reviews. The site's critical consensus reads, "Despite some memorably grizzled performances, True Detective's second season is florid to a fault and so unrelentingly grim that it becomes about as much fun as being stuck in L.A. traffic." On Metacritic, the season has a score of 61 out of 100, based on 41 critics.

David Hinckley of the New York Daily News gave it a very positive review, and wrote: "It's still the kind of show that makes TV viewers reach for phrases like 'golden age of television drama'" and "the second installment of True Detective goes out of the way not to echo the first". Hank Stuever of The Washington Post gave it a generally positive review, praising the performances, and wrote: "There is something still lugubrious and overwrought about True Detective, but there's also a mesmerizing style to it — it's imperfect, but well made."

A mixed review came from Brian Lowry of Variety, who wrote: "Although generally watchable, the inspiration that turned the first [season] into an obsession for many seems to have drained out of writer Nic Pizzolatto's prose."

Sean T. Collins of Rolling Stone gave it a negative review and described the season as having "emerged as the year's most passionately disliked show", and described it as a "squandered opportunity" for Nic Pizzolatto.

==== Season 3 ====
The third season received positive reviews, in comparison to the mixed reception of the second season.

On Rotten Tomatoes, the season has a rating of 84%, based on 110 reviews. The site's critical consensus reads, "Driven by Mahershala Ali's mesmerizing performance, True Detective's third season finds fresh perspective by exploring the fallibility of memory." On Metacritic, the season has a score of 72 out of 100, based on 35 critics.

==== Season 4 ====
The fourth season received widespread critical acclaim from critics, but mixed reviews from viewers.

On Rotten Tomatoes, the season has an approval rating of 93% based on 210 reviews. The website's critics consensus reads, "Frighteningly atmospheric and anchored by Jodie Foster and Kali Reis' superb performances, Night Country is a fresh and frosty variation on True Detective's existential themes." On Metacritic, the season has a weighted average score of 81 out of 100, based on 48 critics.

=== Ratings ===
True Detective : U.S. viewers per episode (millions)

Season	Episode number								Average
Season	1	2	3	4	5	6	7	8	Average
1	2.33	1.67	1.93	1.99	2.25	2.64	2.34	3.52	2.33
2	3.17	3.05	2.62	2.36	2.42	2.34	2.18	2.73	2.61
3	1.44	1.19	1.06	1.45	0.88	1.25	1.32	1.38	1.25
4	0.565	0.678	0.602	0.722	0.371	0.983	–		0.654

Audience measurement performed by Nielsen Media Research

With an average gross audience of 11.9 million viewers, the first season of True Detective was HBO's most-watched show in its first year of airing, surpassing Six Feet Under's 11.4 million viewers in 2001. This rating system counts all airings of a show in its average audience rating, no matter how many times a viewer watches the show during the report period (including DVR recordings, reruns, and streaming on HBO Go). The season averaged 2.33 million total live plus same-day viewers, with viewership numbers generally trending upward over the course of the season. The premiere was the second most-watched series debut for the network with 2.3 million viewers, behind Boardwalk Empire's 4.8 million in 2010. The sixth episode of the season was watched by 2.6 million viewers, and became the first episode to surpass the premiere, while the season-finale was watched by 3.5 million viewers, a 50% increase over the premiere's ratings.

The second-season premiere sustained the viewership numbers of the first season, as the episode was watched by 3.2 million viewers. However, the season's ratings kept a generally downward trend, as the season-finale was watched by 2.7 million viewers, a 22% drop in comparison to the final episode of the first season. Nevertheless, it was the most-watched telecast for the day it aired, drawing an additional 550,000 total viewers from the season's penultimate episode. Overall, the second season of the series averaged 2.61 million total viewers, and 11.3 million viewers in gross audience numbers, slightly below the first season's 11.9 million.

The third season's two-episode premiere drew 1.4 and 1.2 million viewers in linear television format; this was a decline from the first two seasons. The fourth-season premiere received 2 million viewers, including viewership from its linear HBO airing and streaming on Max. Viewership for the fourth season steadily increased with each episode, culminating in 3.2 million total viewers for the season finale and averaged 12.7 million cross-platform viewers for the season, to become the most-watched season of the series. This measurement included streams within 90 days of the season premiere. The first season was not as readily available to stream when it was released.

=== Accolades ===
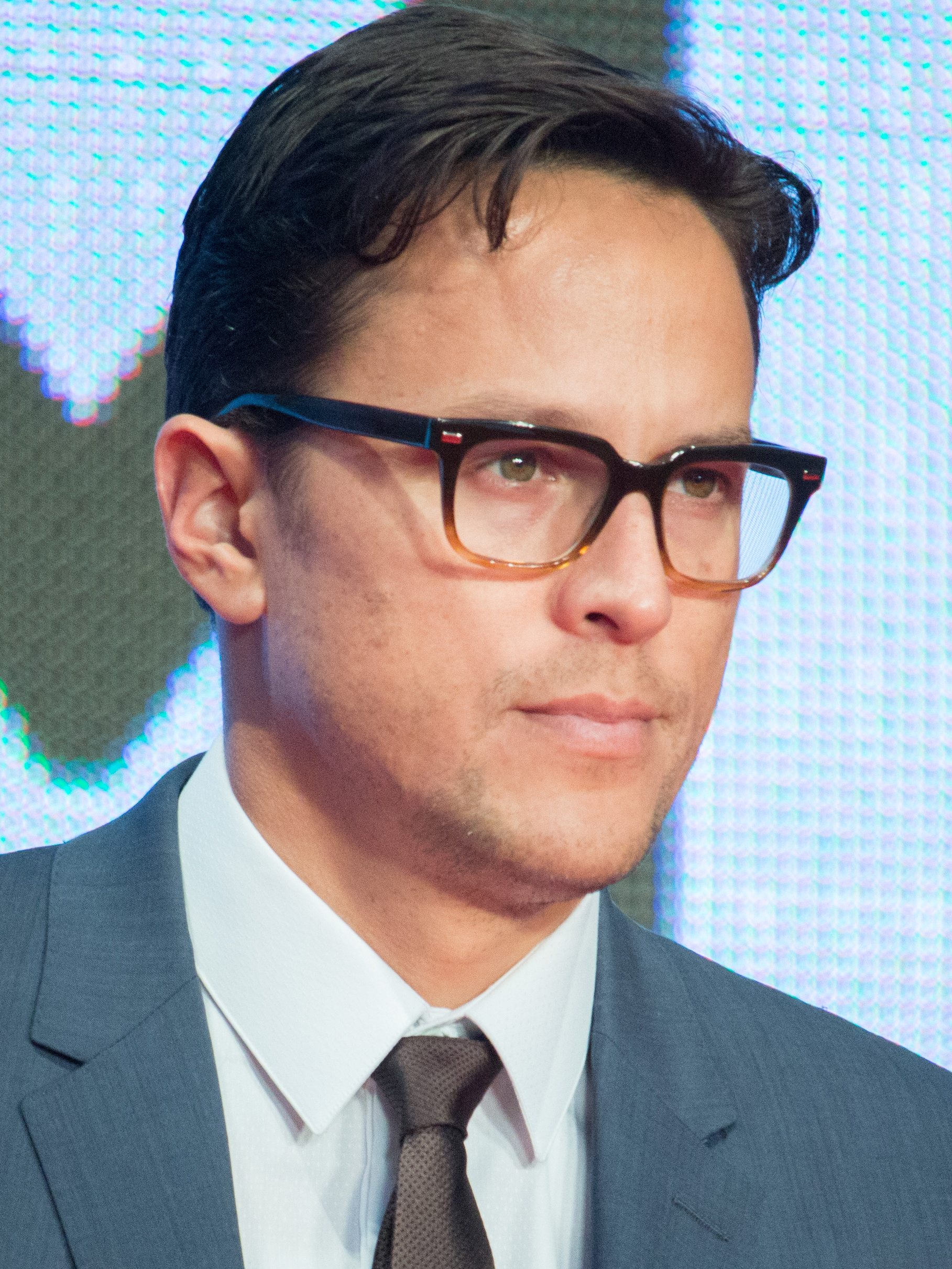
Season 1 director Cary Joji Fukunaga won the Primetime Emmy Award for Outstanding Directing for a Drama Series.

For the 30th TCA Awards, True Detective won for Outstanding Achievement in Movies, Miniseries, and Specials and received nominations for Outstanding New Program and Program of the Year; and McConaughey won for Outstanding Individual Achievement in Drama. For the 4th Critics' Choice Television Awards, the series was nominated for Best Drama Series, and McConaughey won for Best Actor in a Drama Series. For the 66th Primetime Emmy Awards, the series was nominated for Outstanding Drama Series, Harrelson and McConaughey were both nominated for Outstanding Lead Actor in a Drama Series, Pizzolatto was nominated for Outstanding Writing for a Drama Series for "The Secret Fate of All Life", and Fukunaga won for Outstanding Directing for a Drama Series for "Who Goes There".

For the 66th Primetime Creative Arts Emmy Awards, the series was nominated for seven awards, and won four, including Outstanding Cinematography for a Single-Camera Series and Outstanding Main Title Design. For the 67th Writers Guild of America Awards, the series won for Best Drama Series and Best New Series. For the 21st Screen Actors Guild Awards, Harrelson and McConaughey both received nominations for Best Drama Actor. For the 72nd Golden Globe Awards, the series was nominated for Best Miniseries or Television Film, Harrelson and McConaughey were both nominated for Best Actor – Miniseries or Television Film, and Monaghan was nominated for Best Supporting Actress – Series, Miniseries or Television Film. For the 67th Directors Guild of America Awards, Fukunaga was nominated for Outstanding Directing – Drama Series for the episode "Who Goes There".

Night Country garnered a total of nineteen nominations at the 76th Primetime Emmy Awards, thus becoming the most nominated season of the show. Foster won for Outstanding Lead Actress in a Limited or Anthology Series or Movie. Among many, it received nominations for Outstanding Limited or Anthology Series, Outstanding Supporting Actor (for Hawkes), Outstanding Supporting Actress (for Reis), Outstanding Directing and Writing (for Lopez). At the 40th TCA Awards, Night Country received nominations for Outstanding Achievement in Drama and Outstanding Individual Achievement in Drama (for Foster).

== Home media ==
Season	DVD release date			Blu-ray release date		Ref.
Season	Region 1	Region 2	Region 4	Region A	Region B	Ref.
1	June 10, 2014	June 9, 2014	June 25, 2014	June 10, 2014	June 9, 2014	
2	January 5, 2016	January 11, 2016	January 6, 2016	January 5, 2016	January 11, 2016	
3	September 3, 2019	September 2, 2019	September 4, 2019	September 3, 2019	September 2, 2019	
