= Conviction (2016 TV series) =

American legal drama television series

- Genre: Legal drama
- Created by: Liz Friedlander; Liz Friedman
- Starring: Hayley Atwell; Eddie Cahill; Shawn Ashmore; Merrin Dungey; Emily Kinney; Manny Montana; Daniel Franzese
- Composer: John Frizzell
- Country of origin: United States
- Original language: English
- No. of seasons: 1
- No. of episodes: 13

Production
- Executive producers: Liz Friedlander; Liz Friedman; Mark Gordon; Nick Pepper; Thomas L. Moran
- Producer: Lesley Dyer
- Production locations: Toronto, Canada
- Camera setup: Single-camera
- Running time: 40–43 minutes
- Production companies: The Mark Gordon Company; Double Fried Productions; ABC Studios

Original release
- Network: ABC
- Release: October 3, 2016 – January 29, 2017

Conviction is an American legal drama television series on ABC. It premiered on Monday, October 3, 2016. The series, starring Hayley Atwell, was picked up from pilot on May 12, 2016. A full trailer was released on May 17, 2016. On November 8, 2016, ABC announced there would be no back-order for more than the thirteen contracted episodes; however, the remaining episodes of the season aired until its conclusion on January 29, 2017. ABC canceled the series after one season on May 11, 2017.

== Premise ==
Former First Daughter Hayes Morrison is blackmailed into heading the Conviction Integrity Unit, a department of the New York County District Attorney's Office comprising lawyers, detectives, and forensic experts who reexamine cases where there is suspicion of wrongful conviction. The team has only five days to prove each case.

== Cast ==
=== Main ===
- Hayley Atwell as Hayes Morrison, the rebellious former First Daughter of the United States, party-girl, and skilled defense attorney, who graduated first in her class at Harvard. After being suspended for sleeping with her students and following her arrest for cocaine possession, she is blackmailed by the District Attorney into heading the newly formed Conviction Integrity Unit (CIU). Her mother is running for a New York US Senate seat.
- Eddie Cahill as Conner Wallace, the New York County District Attorney who created the CIU. He and Hayes met as rivals on a case in Chicago and soon started a relationship. They both struggle with their romantic feelings toward one another.
- Shawn Ashmore as Sam Spencer, an Assistant District Attorney who was originally selected to head the CIU. Although a team player, he is not happy about his demotion.
- Merrin Dungey as Maxine Bohen, a former NYPD detective who now works for the CIU as a DA investigator. She previously had an addiction to pain pills and has a minor relapse during the series.
- Emily Kinney as Tess Larson, the CIU's paralegal. She frequently assists Frankie with his experiments.
- Manny Montana as Franklin "Frankie" Cruz, an ex-con who works for the CIU as its forensic technician.
- Daniel Franzese as Jackson Morrison, Hayes' older brother and their mother's campaign manager. He and Hayes care deeply for one another and are roommates. Despite being in the main cast, Franzese only appears in seven of the thirteen episodes.

=== Recurring ===
- Bess Armstrong as Harper Morrison, Hayes' and Jackson's mother, the former First Lady who is running for the U.S. Senate. She is divorced from their father, former president Theodore Morrison.
- Sarah Allen as Lisa Crozier, a reporter digging for dirt on Hayes and the CIU.
- Nigel Gibbs as John Bohen, Maxine's father, a retired police detective who runs a local bar.
- Ilfenesh Hadera as Naomi Golden, Wallace's lawyer and both his and Hayes' ex-girlfriend.
- Alex Mallari Jr. as Matty Tan, who was falsely convicted of murder based on Tess' eyewitness testimony as a child. After five years in prison, he was exonerated by DNA evidence.
- Mike Doyle as Rodney Landon, a bigoted activist planning terrorism attacks against Muslims, who reappears later in an attempt to discredit Sam and the CIU.

== Episodes ==
No.	Title	Directed by	Written by	Original release date	US viewers (millions)
1	"Pilot"	Liz Friedlander	Story by : Liz Friedman & Liz Friedlander; Teleplay by : Liz Friedman	October 3, 2016	5.17
After lawyer Hayes Morrison, daughter of a former President of the United States, is arrested for cocaine possession, she is blackmailed by her former adversary and current district attorney, Conner Wallace, into heading his new Conviction Integrity Unit. Putting her in charge provides publicity, but slights a member of the team. Hayes reluctantly accepts in order to save herself and her family from public embarrassment. She and her team take the case of Odell Dwyer, a "good-looking black poster-boy" in prison for murdering his girlfriend back when the two were in high school. Through investigation of the forensics, the case detective, and scene re-creation, Hayes and the CIU prove that Odell was not the murderer.
2	"Bridge and Tunnel Vision"	Rob Seidenglanz	Liz Friedman & Liz Friedlander	October 10, 2016	4.23
Hayes decides to go after one of Wallace's career-making cases, the Prospect 3. They were three boys charged with raping and assaulting a woman, Zadie Daniels, on her way from work. Zadie was hit in the head by a brick, so she does not remember the attack, but the media called her a hero. None of the members of the group—Mike, Brian, and Seamus—was a DNA match for the semen in the rape kit, but they confessed after exhaustive interrogations, each one blaming the others. After learning that the timelines did not match up, the CIU discovered that Zadie had sex with a married man the night of the assault, the source of the semen. They also learn that Brian had previously attacked other females, including his foster sister, which is why Wallace was sure that the three boys were the culprits. Hayes gets Brian to admit that he was the only person responsible for the assault, freeing Mike and Seamus. Although she proves two people innocent, Hayes feels depressed, as Zadie's reputation is now ruined.
3	"Dropping Bombs"	Liz Friedlander	Thomas L. Moran	October 17, 2016	4.24
To spite Wallace after his comment about "the new Hayes Morrison," Hayes digs up the case of bigoted activist Rodney Landon (Mike Doyle), convicted of planting a bomb in a mosque office and killing four men, including the Imam. The CIU team finds Landon was primarily a suspect because of an illegal search by the Counter-Terrorism Unit and that, although he didn't plant the bomb, he was planning a far more deadly attack. Because the illegal search would throw out most of the evidence against Landon and get him released, Sam talks to a skinhead in prison. Hayes is notified that Landon was attacked due to rumors of his being a snitch and stabbed his attacker with a shiv. By committing a felony on camera, he will remain in prison. The actual bomber turns out to be the wife of the Imam, who was angry because of his multiple affairs. Hayes' cocaine arrest becomes public when a video of her in jail is released to the media.
4	"Mother's Little Burden"	Paul Holahan	Samantha Corbin-Miller	October 24, 2016	4.74
The CIU works on the case of Penny Price (Teri Polo), a stay-at-home mom who vlogged about taking care of her violent autistic son, Owen. Penny was charged with second degree murder via leaving a bottle of soy sauce outside, which Owen drank in its entirety. However, Frankie finds out from the case's toxicologist that Owen did not die from a sodium overdose, but from a lack of sugar due to a deliberately administered insulin shot. They go to Penny's husband, Greg Price, a pharmacist who was having an affair, as well as Owen's caretaker, Eduardo, whose sister had dangerously low insulin levels on the day of Owen's murder. Hayes realizes that the only person with means and motive was Penny's daughter, Emily. Penny tells Emily to keep quiet and says that she will take the blame, telling Hayes that her daughter deserves a life. Meanwhile, Hayes must juggle solving the case and working with her brother, Jackson, to prepare for a "mea culpa" television interview. Jackson drills her on what to wear (the right suit and her mother's pearls), what to say, and how to say it. During the interview, she uses her charm and the rehearsed responses, but eventually her lies and the pearls begin to choke her. She then candidly explains that she got her do-over and job as a result of her privilege and that she is now attempting to use some of it to free innocent people. Although this decision earns her immediate public approval, it severely hurts her mother's campaign and throws Wallace under the bus. The night after solving the case, Hayes goes home to Jackson's apartment, only to find that he has kicked her out.
5	"The 1% Solution"	Scott Hornbacher	Steve Lichtman	November 7, 2016	3.64
After being kicked out, Hayes decides to sleep in the office and call Jackson every day until he forgives her. The team focuses on the case of Will Jarrett, an orphan who was taken in by the Porters, a rich family. The mother, Debra Porter, was stabbed several times and Will was blamed. The team traces a shoeprint back to the father, David, and the gardener, Luis, both claiming innocence. Shortly after, the son, Sean, is seen on video planting the murder weapon in Luis' truck, but David claims that Will threatened Sean to do so. Will decides to say that the claim is true. Suspecting that Will is hiding something, the team walks through the crime scene and sees that it is likely both Sean and Will killed Debra. After Will admits that he and Sean were lovers and provides video evidence of the plan, Sean is arrested. David explains that Debra knew and didn't care that Sean was gay, but believed that Will was unfit for Sean because he wasn't well-off. Jackson finally forgives Hayes. Hayes also tries to confess her feelings to Wallace, but is unable to do so. She finds out that, because of the Justice Department's investigation, Wallace has sought outside counsel in Naomi Golden, who is both his and Hayes' ex-girlfriend. Meanwhile, Frankie is conflicted about the appeal of his former cellmate, Rey. Tess looks into it and says he's guilty, but Frankie later talks to Hayes, who agrees to look at the case for him if he decides that's what he wants.
6	"#StayWoke"	Christine Moore	Lynne E. Litt & Jewel McPherson	November 14, 2016	4.17
After the divisive murder of a black teenager by a cop, Hayes decides to choose the case of Porscha Williams (Susan Heyward), a black activist who was convicted of the shooting murder of Sergeant Kelsey Blake during a protest. Maxine feels conflicted as she is both a black single mother and an ex-cop. Meanwhile, Hayes meets with Naomi, Wallace's lawyer, who flirts with Hayes. Tess tells Frankie about being an eyewitness to her aunt's murder at age 12 and identifying the wrong man. The man, Matty Tan, was cleared by DNA after five years in prison and she has been going to his local coffee-cart frequently without him knowing her connection. The team finds that one eyewitness lied under oath and that other witnesses may have confused Porscha with another woman. They then discover that the Medical Examiner's van was near the scene longer than necessary and that the entry and exit wounds may have been mixed up, meaning that Kelsey may have been shot from behind. Using the new angle, the team discovers that one of the other witnesses, George Stayner, was responsible. George, when confronted, says it was an accident and then commits suicide. After Porscha is released, Hayes finds Naomi and Wallace kissing each other.
7	"A Simple Man"	Brad Turner	Simran Baidwan	November 21, 2016	4.14
The CIU team investigates the case of a man with a low IQ, Leo Scarlata, who was convicted of setting a fire in his family's restaurant. The fire killed one man and injured another. Wallace allows a documentary film crew who have been working on Scarlata's case to follow the team around, which infuriates Hayes. The investigation finds that the fire didn't start the way that it was previously believed to have started and that, although Leo was responsible, he was just "following the rules". Those "rules" had been deliberately altered in order to cause the fire. Leo is released.
8	"Bad Deals"	John Stuart Scott	Eduardo Javier Canto & Ryan Maldonado	November 28, 2016	3.36
The CIU team takes on the case of Josh Fleck, a teacher convicted of kidnapping and murdering his high school student, Sierra Macy, ten years before. The reason for the investigation is Sierra's sudden reappearance after escaping her basement prison only to find her captor dead. Sam was the prosecutor on the case and, though the murder conviction has been dropped, he still insists that Fleck was involved in the kidnapping. The team finds that the waitress eyewitness lied, that the blood evidence could be explained away, and that Sierra was hauled away in a car trunk while Fleck drove a pickup. When Sam visits the waitress, Melissa, he hears the chimes that Sierra remembers. Melissa points a gun at him, but the police burst in and rescue him. Fleck is released. The Justice Department drops its case against Wallace after Hayes provides information.
9	"A Different Kind of Death"	Andrew McCarthy	Lynne E. Litt	December 5, 2016	3.34
Wallace gives the CIU the case of Earl Slavitt (Richard Thomas), a death-row inmate who was convicted of the murder of Tom Simon, a federal prosecutor and Wallace's friend. Earl was originally prosecuted by Tom for embezzling money from his job. After he was released from prison, he made threats against Tom. Wallace asks Hayes to review the case, as Tom was against the death penalty and Earl is to be executed in five days. While the CIU reviews the case in New York, Hayes and Wallace go to Indiana to try and stop Earl's execution. They have to deal with Bill Newton, the Assistant U.S. Attorney who was on the prosecution's side for both cases who gets in their way. The team finds that an ex-con was hired to kill Tom and that Earl's boss was the actual embezzler. Someone in the U.S. Attorney's office was taking bribes. Hayes, after talking to Earl's former co-worker, Nina, learns that Bill ordered the hit on Tom to cover his tracks. Hayes tries to contact Wallace to stop the execution, but is too late. After hearing the news, Sam catches Maxine taking pain-killers.
10	"Not Okay"	Jan Eliasberg	Thomas L. Moran & Simran Baidwan	January 1, 2017	2.06
The team takes the case of Sophie Hausen (Jordan Hayes), convicted of murdering Travis Carter, a college student whom she claims raped her. Retesting the DNA on the murder weapon shows only a partial match and a recreation of the crime shows a potentially hazardous exit. While checking out other possible suspects, the team finds out there were other victims who hadn't reported their rapes after witnessing Sophie's treatment by school and law officials. However, they had all talked to a rape counselor, Elyse Salmon, who decided to take matters into her own hands. Elyse's confession gets Sophie released. Hayes then calls out the school’s administrator on doing nothing to stop Travis' actions in front of Alumni and donors. On a personal note, Tess finally tells Matty about their connection, and he doesn’t take it well. Also, Hayes, with a boost from Jackson, decides to try and make things work with Wallace.
11	"Black Orchid"	Metin Hüseyin	Samantha Corbin-Miller & Steve Lichtman	January 8, 2017	2.70
A current case ties back to an old one. A woman is found beaten to death. Her physical description, the manner of death, and the "Black Orchid" lipstick smeared on her mouth match the M.O. of a convicted serial killer, Clark Sims (Patrick Breen), from ten years earlier. The CIU team doesn't know if Sims is innocent or if there is a copycat. They are able to explain away the fingerprint evidence against Sims. They also find that the man arrested for the recent murder couldn't have done it. Figuring in the ten-year hiatus between crimes, they speculate that the killer was in prison. A search of inmates fitting their parameters locates a suspect, Donald Cutler, who was in the vicinity of the recent murder. Cutler goes after the woman who survived his attack years ago and she kills him. Sims is released.
12	"Enemy Combatant"	Paul Edwards	Eduardo Javier Canto & Ryan Maldonado	January 15, 2017	2.24
Former President Theodore Morrison visits Hayes at home and persuades her and the CIU to take on the case of Omar Abbas (Karan Oberoi), a Muslim-American citizen held for six years without trial in a military facility for possessing liquid sarin. Omar states he didn't know what was in the duffel bag; it had been left in the trunk of his taxi. Although obstructed by the feds because Omar is considered an enemy combatant, the team discovers that the feds' informant is Omar's cousin who, after being tortured, told the feds what they wanted to hear. They also track down the owner of the duffel bag, Paul Sedgewick, who was planning to use the sarin on a bank he blamed for his family's pain. He backed out of the chemical attack but, instead of taking the bag away, he accidentally left it in the taxi and subsequently reported it to the tip line. Omar is released. Hayes' father tells both Wallace and Hayes that their new relationship won't work. Hayes tells him otherwise but she has doubts.
13	"Past, Prologue & What's to Come"	Liz Friedlander	Story by : Vincent Angell; Teleplay by : Vincent Angell, Liz Friedman & Liz Friedlander	January 29, 2017	2.43
Hayes takes on the case of Gerald Harris (Mark Moses), a man she unsuccessfully defended in Chicago nine years earlier against charges that he murdered his wife, Claire. Wallace prosecuted the case. As the team struggles to find a suspect who could have committed the murder, Hayes learns that Sam will be forced to testify during a trial for Rodney Landon, which would effectively discredit the CIU and subject all of its cases to review. Sam informs her that he intends to take the fifth, ending his career, but keeping the CIU intact. Frankie eventually confirms that Claire died from a heart attack before she fell, the evidence of which was not found at her original autopsy. Although the subpoena against Sam is dropped, Wallace orders Hayes to fire him for going "rogue". She deliberately kisses Sam, committing sexual harassment in view of witnesses, meaning he can't be fired without her being forced to resign.

== Production ==
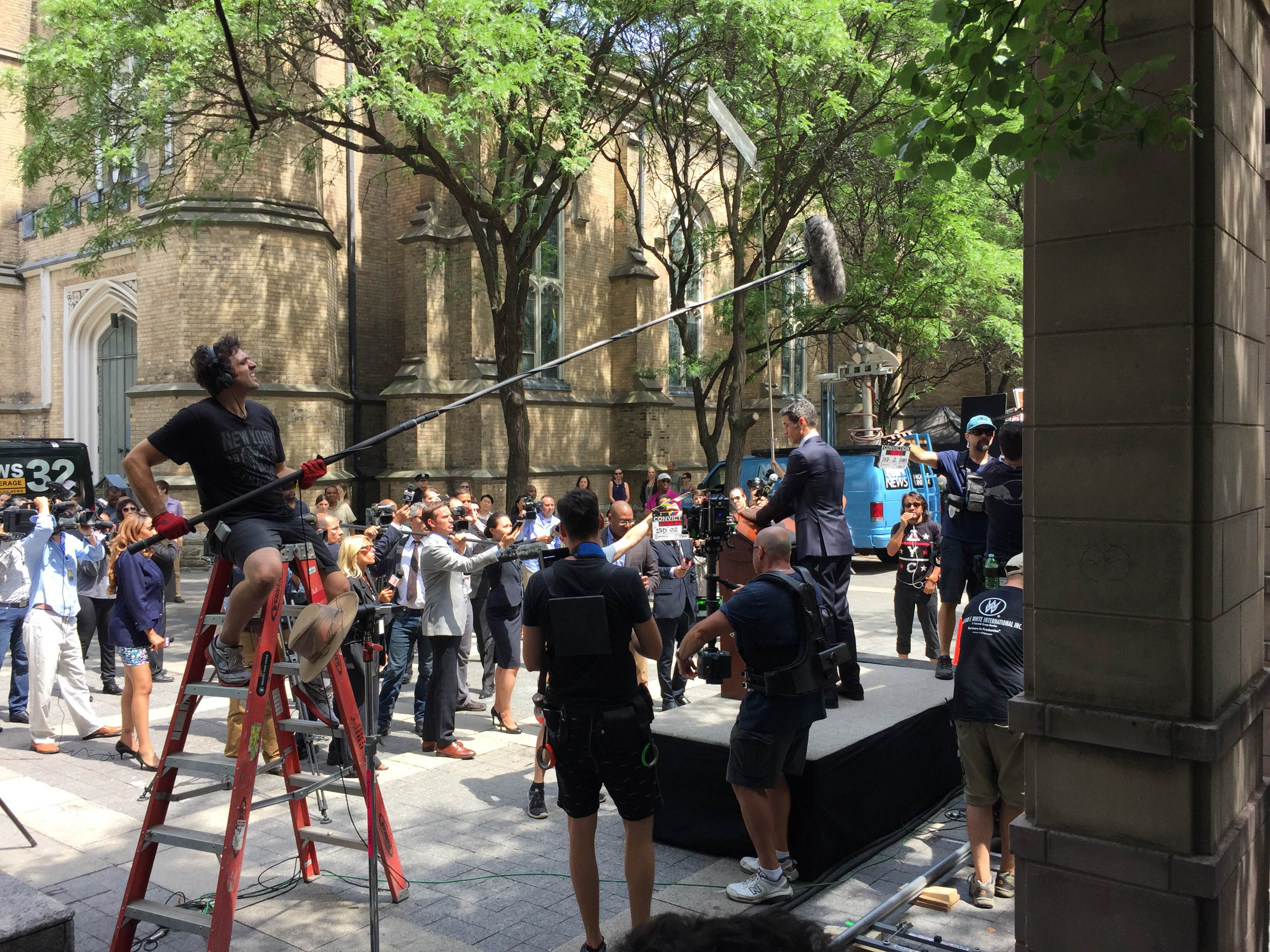
Conviction shooting in Bell Trinity Square, Toronto, July 2016.

In March 2016, the pilot was shot in Toronto, Ontario, Canada, as was the rest of the series, primarily at Cinespace Film Studios' Kipling Avenue facility.

When the pilot was being cast, the main character's name was reported as "Carter Morrison". The character was renamed "Hayes Morrison" before the pilot was filmed.

Daniel di Tomasso, who was originally cast as Hayes' brother, was dropped after the pilot was filmed for creative reasons. Daniel Franzese was recast as his replacement starting with the pilot.

Four of the cast members left the series for other projects after production ended. Manny Montana signed to appear as a regular character on the NBC series Good Girls, Emily Kinney signed to the already ordered ABC series Ten Days in the Valley, Hayley Atwell signed to star in the BBC One/Starz miniseries Howards End and Merrin Dungey signed to co-star in the CBS comedy pilot Brothered Up.

== Reception ==
=== Critical response ===
Conviction has received generally negative reviews from television critics. Rotten Tomatoes shows a 20% "rotten" rating based on 41 reviews with an average score of 4.79/10. The site's critical consensus reads: "While Hayley Atwell proves a strong and likable lead, her charisma alone cannot elevate Conviction from its worn and familiar trappings." The rating on Metacritic is 45 out of 100, indicating "mixed or average reviews".

=== Ratings ===
Viewership and ratings per episode of Conviction
No.	Title	Air date	Rating/share (18–49)	Viewers (millions)	DVR (18–49)	DVR viewers (millions)	Total (18–49)	Total viewers (millions)
1	"Pilot"	October 3, 2016	0.9/3	5.17	0.7	3.00	1.6	8.17
2	"Bridge and Tunnel Vision"	October 10, 2016	0.8/3	4.23	0.6	2.49	1.4	6.74
3	"Dropping Bombs"	October 17, 2016	0.7/3	4.24	0.6	2.45	1.3	6.69
4	"Mother's Little Burden"	October 24, 2016	0.8/3	4.74	—N/a	—N/a	—N/a	—N/a
5	"The 1% Solution"	November 7, 2016	0.6/2	3.64	0.6	2.31	1.2	5.95
6	"#StayWoke"	November 14, 2016	0.8/3	4.17	—N/a	1.94	—N/a	6.12
7	"A Simple Man"	November 21, 2016	0.7/3	4.14	0.6	2.01	1.3	6.15
8	"Bad Deals"	November 28, 2016	0.6/2	3.36	0.4	1.91	1.0	5.29
9	"A Different Kind of Death"	December 5, 2016	0.6/2	3.34	0.5	1.97	1.1	5.31
10	"Not Okay"	January 1, 2017	0.4/2	2.06	—N/a	—N/a	—N/a	—N/a
11	"Black Orchid"	January 8, 2017	0.5/2	2.70	0.5	2.00	1.0	4.70
12	"Enemy Combatant"	January 15, 2017	0.4/2	2.24	0.5	1.89	0.9	4.13
13	"Past, Prologue & What's to Come"	January 29, 2017	0.5/2	2.43	0.6	2.08	1.1	4.51
