= El cucuy =

El cucuy may refer to:

- "El Cucuy", an episode of the US television series, Grimm.
- An alternate spelling of el coco, a mythical creature.
- Renán Almendárez Coello, host of El Cucuy de la mañana, also known by this name.
- Tony Ferguson, a UFC fighter who uses it as his nickname.

== See also ==
- El Cocuy, a town in Colombia
- El Cocuy National Park
