= Tim Griffin (actor) =

American actor

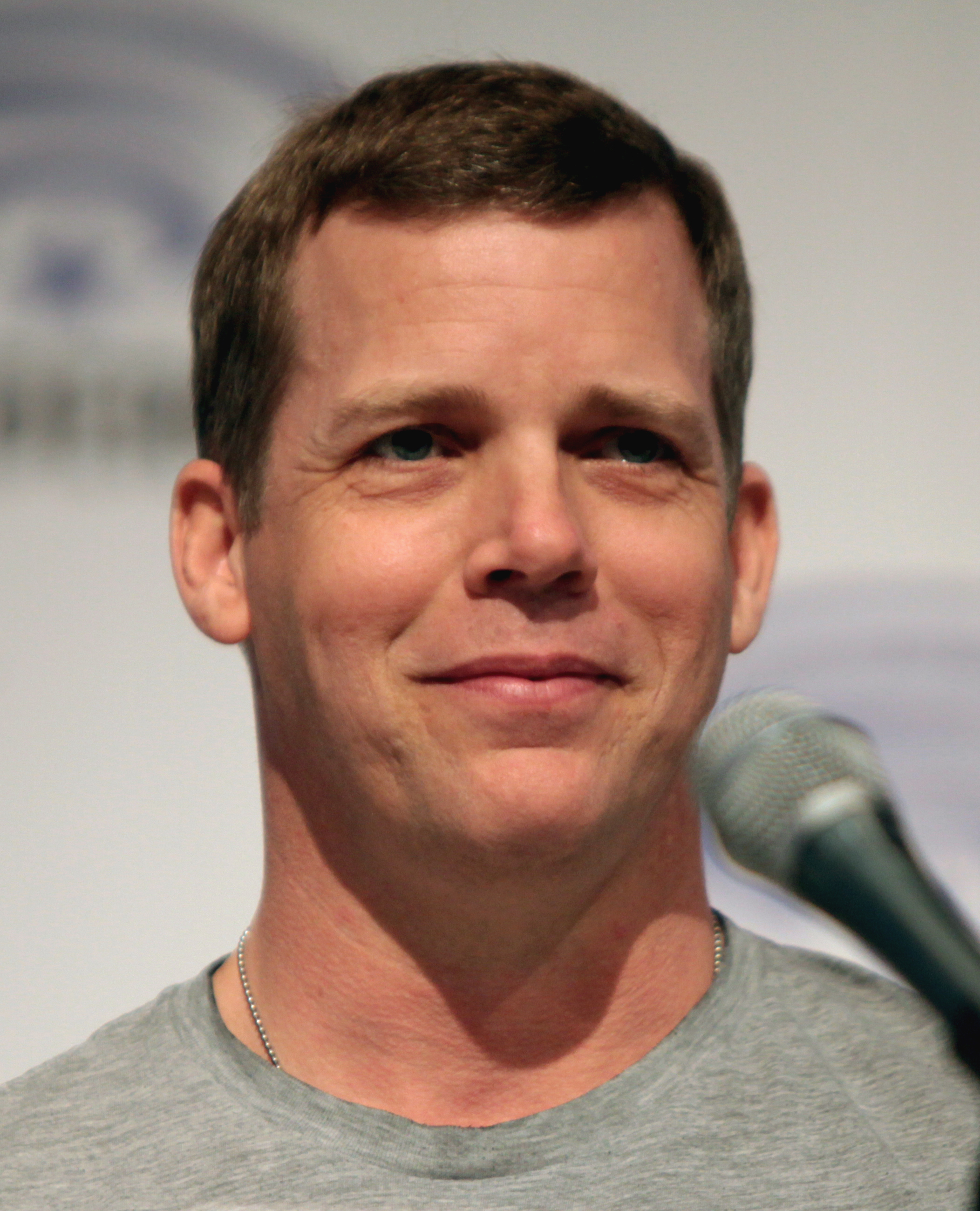
- Griffin at WonderCon 2015
- Born: Timothy Collins Griffin; Chicago, Illinois, U.S.
- Occupation: Actor
- Years active: 1989–present
- Spouse: Alicia Carr
- Children: 2

Tim Griffin is an American film and television actor best known for his roles in Grey's Anatomy, Prime Suspect, Covert Affairs and Wayward Pines.

== Early life ==
Griffin was raised in Chicago, Illinois. He studied English and political philosophy at the University of Vermont.

== Career ==
Often dubbed "the actor who is in everything", Griffin has had an extensive career in television and film. Some of his film credits include Cloverfield, Leatherheads, The Men Who Stare at Goats, A Better Life, American Sniper, Super 8, Abduction and Central Intelligence.

A few of his more notable television roles are Adam Hassler on Wayward Pines, Ron Kellaher on Aquarius, Ronny O'Malley on Grey's Anatomy, Seth Newman on Covert Affairs and Detective Augie Blando on Prime Suspect.

== Personal life ==
Griffin is married to Alicia Carr, with whom he has two children.

== Filmography ==
=== Films ===
Year	Title	Role	Notes
1991	For the Very First Time		Television film
1995	Higher Learning	Orientation Advisor	
1995	Evolver	Dwight	
1997	Lover Girl	Wright Herman	
2000	Wind River	Nick Wilson (older)	
2000	Boys and Girls	Timmy	
2002	Cherish	Officer Griffin	
2004	The Bourne Supremacy	John Nevins	
2005	Kids in America	Tony	
2006	Danika	Police Captain	
2007	Backyards & Bullets	Det. Rick Coombs	Television film
2008	Cloverfield	Command Center Officer	
2008	Leatherheads	Ralph	
2008	Iron Man	CAOC Analyst	
2009	Star Trek	Kelvin Engineer	
2009	The Men Who Stare at Goats	Tim Kootz	
2010	Fair Game	Paul	
2011	Conception	Tommy	
2011	Super 8	Commando	
2011	A Better Life	Juvie Officer	
2011	Abduction	Red Flannel	
2011	Carjacked	Officer	
2012	The Collection	Dre	
2014	Not Safe for Work	Hitman	
2014	American Sniper	Colonel Gronski	
2015	Americons	Todd Elliott	
2015	The Gift	Kevin 'KK' Keelor	
2016	Central Intelligence	Agent Stan Mitchell	
2017	Extortion	Chief of Mission Sweeney	
2022	Next Exit	John	
2022	Arctic Void	Alan Meursault	
2023	Missing	James Allen	
2027	Voltron		Post-production

=== Television ===
Year	Title	Role	Notes
1989	ABC Afterschool Special	Matthew Robinson	Episode: "Taking a Stand"
1989	In the Heat of the Night	Jon Conlan	Episode: "Murder Most Ancient"
1990	Hunter	Gil Reynolds	Episode: "Brotherly Love"
1990	Who's the Boss?	Gene	Episode: "Her Father's Daughter"
1990	China Beach	Tommy	Episode: "F.N.G."
1992	Parker Lewis Can't Lose	Dirk	Episode: "Jerry's Journey"
1992	Empty Nest	Ruffian #2	Episode: "It's Not Easy Being Green"
1993	Against the Grain	Mark	4 episodes
1994	Saved by the Bell: The College Years	Jason	Episode: "The Rave"
1994	Dead at 21	Devin	Episode: "Live for Today"
1995	Weird Science	Rod	Episode: "Bikini Camp Slasher"
1996	Cybill	Frat Guy #1	Episode: "Lowenstein's Lament"
1996	Sliders	Jacob	Episode: "Electric Twist Acid Test"
1997	Pacific Blue	Nicky Mink	Episode: "Rumplestiltskin"
1997	Walker, Texas Ranger	Bart Valen	2 episodes
1998	Honolulu CRU		TV pilot
1998	Party of Five	Richie Grayson	2 episodes
1999	Seven Days	Tom Boxdollar	Episode: "HAARP Attack"
2000	Charmed	The Rabbit	Episode: "Animal Pragmatism"
2001	Family Law	Bill Deverell	Episode: "Angel's Flight"
2002	JAG	Reconnaissance Operative	Episode: "The Mission"
2003	7th Heaven	Cop	Episode: "Baggage"
2004	The Guardian	John Rose	Episode: "Remember"
2005	Medical Investigation	Detective Chris Leinberger	Episode: "Mousetrap"
2005	24	Agent Baron	Episode: "Day 4: 8:00 p.m.-9:00 p.m."
2005	The Closer	Roy Barnes	Episode: "Fatal Retraction"
2005–2007	Grey's Anatomy	Ronny O'Malley	5 episodes
2006	NCIS	Marine Sgt. Malcolm Porter	Episode: "Light Sleeper"
2006	ER	Captain John Evans	2 episodes
2006	The Unit	Morgan Eliot	Episode: "Manhunt"
2007	Women's Murder Club	Dennis Iverson	Episode: "Grannies, Guns and Love Mints"
2008	CSI: Miami	Commander Briggs	Episode: "Down to the Wire"
2008	Bones	Pete Steckel	Episode: "The Man in the Outhouse"
2008	Cold Case	Asst. Coach Walters '73	Episode: "Glory Days"
2009	Lie to Me	Principal Castle	Episode: "Pilot"
2010	Big Love	Ralph	Episode: "Free at Last"
2010	The Defenders	Agent Reese	Episode: "Nevada v. Dennis"
2010	Outlaw	Officer Daniel Hale	Episode: "In Re: Officer Daniel Hale"
2011–2012	Prime Suspect	Detective Augie Blando	Main cast (season 1)
2012	Vegas	Lt. Norman Kemp	Episode: "Exposure"
2012–2013	Covert Affairs	Seth Newman	7 episodes
2013	Burn Notice	Frank Westen	Episode: "Psychological Warfare"
2013	Grimm	Mr. Keary	Episode: "Stories We Tell Our Young"
2014	How to Get Away with Murder	AUSA Caleb Abernathy	Episode: "Let's Get to Scooping"
2014	NCIS: Los Angeles	Unit Leader	Episode: "Black Budget"
2014–2015	The Mentalist	Ken Spackman	2 episodes
2015	Castle	Spalding Elliot	Episode: "Castle, P.I."
2015–2016	Wayward Pines	Adam Hassler	Main cast
2015–2016	Aquarius	Ron Kellaher	6 episodes
2017	APB	Isaac Hunter	Episode: "Signal Loss"
2017	Chance	Frank Lambert	7 episodes
2017-2018	Valor	Davis Goundry	5 episodes
2018-2019	NCIS: New Orleans	Avery Walker	4 episodes
2019	Ryan Hansen Solves Crimes on Television	Clancy	Episode: "The Ry Guy Goes to Jail"
2019	True Detective	Special Agent Burt Diller	4 episodes
2019	Young Sheldon	Clint Watson	Episode: "A Proposal and a Popsicle Stick Cross"
2021	The Resident	Nate	Episode: "Hero Moments"
2022	Night Sky	Max	
