= Isaiah Stannard =

American actor

- Born: October 1, 2004 (age 21); Manhattan, New York, U.S.
- Occupation: Actor
- Years active: 2015–present

Isaiah Stannard (born October 1, 2004) is an American actor. He is best known for his role as Sadie, and later as Ben, in Good Girls.

== Career ==
Isaiah has appeared in a couple television programs, a single film, and a few short films. His first major credited role was a voiceover of the Croatian short film Star Stuff: A Story of Carl Sagan, where he provided the English voiceover for the young Carl Sagan. His other extra work includes his appearance in Brad's Status, and his role in short films such as Party Dress, where he played Harper. His largest role was his recurring appearance in Good Girls, where he played Ben (formerly known as Sadie), a trans character that received a large degree of positive support in his coming-out scene. Isaiah also appeared in Genera+ion as Evan.

== Personal life ==
Isaiah Stannard was born in Manhattan, New York City on October 1, 2004. A notable feature of his life is his openness about being transgender; all of his acting roles after his coming out have been trans characters. Isaiah is outspoken about his experience with transitioning and how it affected his career. During the early stages of filming for Good Girls Isaiah came out as transgender, identifying as male. This led to an open conversation between Isaiah and executive producer Jenna Bans about how best to portray the character.

== Filmography ==
=== Film ===
Year	Title	Role
2015	Star Stuff: A Story of Carl Sagan	Carl Sagan (Voice)
2017	Brad's Status	Tween One
2017	Party Dress	Harper Klein
2019	5 Teenagers Walk Into a Bar	Sam

=== Television ===
Year	Title	Role	Notes
2018–2021	Good Girls	Sadie Marks / Ben Marks	Series regular
2021	Genera+ion	Evan	1 episode
