= Manny Montana =

American actor

- Born: September 26, 1983 (age 42); Long Beach, California, U.S.
- Education: California State University, Long Beach
- Occupation: Actor
- Years active: 2008–present
- Spouse: Adelfa Marr
- Children: 1

Manny Montana (born September 26, 1983) is an American actor. Born and raised in Long Beach, California, he started his career in 2008 and is best known for his character Rio in the series Good Girls.

== Early life and education ==
Manny Montana was born and raised in Long Beach, California. After graduating from Jordan High School, Montana got a football scholarship to California State University Sacramento, but quit after an arm injury and dislocating his shoulder for the eighth time. He transferred to California State University, Long Beach to major in Journalism and Broadcasting. He worked as a DJ in the school's student-radio station, which landed him an intern position at Power 100.3. He is a first generation Mexican-American.

== Career ==
After graduating in 2006, Montana acted in a number of student films which eventually led him to guest star in single episodes of various television series. In 2012, Montana was cast as Johnny "J.T." Turturro in Graceland. In regards to fan reaction to the show, he stated: "Being cast on a regular procedural, where everything gets wrapped up by the end of the episode was always a fear of mine because that doesn't really test you as an actor. On this show, every week we're playing somebody different, there's great dialogue, I love my co-stars, it's fun to be at work and I think the fans are seeing that. Regardless of whether they like the show or not, I think they like the cast and the dynamic we have together."

In 2015, Montana appeared in Michael Mann's Blackhat as Lozano, a "wanted criminal". Montana auditioned for a lead role and did not receive it, but got offered a supporting role.

From 2018 to 2021, he was a member of the main cast of Good Girls as Rio. The show was cancelled after four seasons. In 2021, Montana appeared in one episode of the television show All American, portraying coach Dante Smart. In April 2022, it was announced that Montana would join season four of the show Mayans M.C., as a member of the Yuma Mayans.

== Personal life ==
Montana is married to Adelfa Marr, with whom he has one child, a son. Marr is a life coach providing services digitally. The couple keeps their life private and their child away from the public.

== Filmography ==
Film
| Year | Film | Role | Notes |
|---|---|---|---|
| 2008 | El Primo | Luis | Short |
| 2008 | East L.A. | Alex Guzman | |
| 2008 | Sanctuary | Ramirez | |
| 2009 | Detached | Manuel Sabatar | |
| 2009 | Road to Moloch | Martinez | Short |
| 2009 | Maria de Covina | Manuel Batista | Short |
| 2010 | 30 Is the New 12 | Paco | Short |
| 2011 | The Ghost of Crenshaw | Terence Simmons | Short |
| 2012 | Atonal | Young Fighter | Short |
| 2012 | Courageous | Alexander | Short |
| 2013 | Go for Sisters | Tenoch | |
| 2015 | Blackhat | Alonso Reyes | |
| 2015 | Hacker | Lozano | |
| 2016 | Undrafted | Zapata | |
| 2018 | The Mule | Axl | |
| 2020 | I Hate the Man in My Basement | Logan | |

Television
| Year | Title | Role | Notes |
|---|---|---|---|
| 2008 | ER | Football Orderly | Episode: "Heal Thyself" |
| 2008 | Eleventh Hour | Vasquez | Episode: "Surge" |
| 2009 | Terminator: The Sarah Connor Chronicles | Hector | Episode: "Some Must Watch While Some Must Sleep" |
| 2009 | Raising the Bar | Romeo Vasquez | Episode: "I'll Be Down to Get You in a Taxi, Honey" |
| 2009 | Cold Case | Francisco Ariza | Episode: "Officer Down" |
| 2010 | Lie to Me | Dax | Episode: "Delinquent" |
| 2011 | The Chicago Code | Antonio Betz | 2 episodes |
| 2011 | Chase | Matt Nestor | Episode: "Roundup" |
| 2011 | Breakout Kings | Cesar Vega | Episode: "Where in the World Is Carmen Vega" |
| 2011 | CSI: NY | Off. Glen Cates | Episode: "Officer Involved" |
| 2012 | Cybergeddon | Frank Porter | 2 episodes |
| 2013–2015 | Graceland | Johnny Tuturro | Main cast |
| 2013 | Grimm | David Florez | Episode: "El Cucuy" |
| 2014 | Power | Miguel | Episode: "Not Exactly How We Planned" |
| 2015 | NCIS: LA | Diego Salazar | Episode: "The Long Goodbye" |
| 2015 | The Following | Luis Serra | Episode: "The Hunt" |
| 2016 | Lucifer | Javier Junior | Episode: "Pops" |
| 2016–2017 | Conviction | Franklin "Frankie" Cruz | Main cast, 13 episodes |
| 2017 | Rosewood | Marcos Villa | Recurring cast, 5 episodes |
| 2017–2018 | Miles from Tomorrowland | Zeno | Voice, 10 episodes |
| 2018–2021 | Good Girls | Rio | Main cast |
| 2021 | All American | Dante Smart | Episode: "Ready or Not" |
| 2022 | Mayans M.C. | Manny | 8 episodes |
| 2022 | Westworld | Carver | 2 episodes |
| 2025 | Ironheart | John King | 5 episodes |

Video Games
| Year | Title | Role | Notes |
|---|---|---|---|
| 2012 | L.A. Noire | Felix Alvarro | Voice and performance capture |
| 2012 | L.A. Noire | Jorge Garcia Cruz | Voice and performance capture |
