= Stories We Tell Our Young =

- Grimm episode
- Episode no.: Season 3 Episode 6
- Directed by: Aaron Lipstadt
- Written by: Michael Duggan
- Cinematography by: Eliot Rockett
- Editing by: Ray Daniels III
- Production code: 306
- Original air date: December 6, 2013
- Running time: 42 minutes

Guest appearances
- Tim Griffin as Mr. Keary; Gabriel Suttle as Daniel Keary; Julianne Christie as Nancy Keary

Episode chronology
← Previous "El Cucuy"	Next → "Cold Blooded"
- Grimm season 3

"Stories We Tell Our Young" is the 6th episode of season 3 of the supernatural drama television series Grimm and the 50th episode overall, which premiered on December 6, 2013, on the cable network NBC. The episode was written by Michael Duggan, and was directed by Aaron Lipstadt.

== Plot ==
Opening quote: "We don't believe, we only fear."

Renard (Sasha Roiz) tells Nick (David Giuntoli) and Hank (Russell Hornsby) he will leave for Europe to discuss the family crisis. Meanwhile, a family takes their son, Daniel (Gabriel Suttle) to a church to get an exorcism. During the exorcism, Daniel kills the monsignor, wounds the seminary student and then hides.

During the investigation, Nick and Hank find Daniel in the church and take him to St. Joseph's Hospital for a diagnosis. They talk with Mr. Keary (Tim Griffin), who explains that about a year ago, Daniel began to change mentally and physically. Nick and Hank begin to deduce that Daniel is a Wesen. Renard arrives at Vienna and is picked by Meisner (Damien Puckler), who sets him in a safe house as the Royals may send someone to kill him. Meanwhile, Adalind (Claire Coffee) is called by someone who states that he'll send a car so she can go to a house.

The student wakes up and tells Nick and Hank that what he saw wasn't Daniel, it was instead a true demon. Nick and Hank then see Daniel change into the "demon". Upon telling Monroe (Silas Weir Mitchell) and Rosalee (Bree Turner), they deduce that Daniel is a very rare and much feared Grausen. The stories state that through lack of better understanding of the cause, they presumed perhaps some kind of Wesen spirit would invade a child's body, and if said Grausen were left to grow into adulthood they'd invariably become much feared psychopaths wreaking total havoc. So they have to follow Wesen rules and need to report it to the Wesen Council; where the punishment for Daniel would be a sudden disappearance leading to a death sentence. However, if they don't report it, then they too might incur a death sentence for their non-reporting and disloyalty.

De Groot (Nurmi Husa) dispatches Alexander (Spencer Conway) to kill Daniel. While investigating in the books, Juliette (Bitsie Tulloch) finds that as there were high blood cell count, fever and his stressed immune system, they may be dealing with an infectious disease. They question the parents and discover that during a visit to Jordan, Daniel swam in the Dead Sea and then began experiencing flu-like symptoms. The doctors gave him medication and he was soon fine. In the safe house, Renard and Meisner are attacked by two men from the Verrat and kill them and escape to the sewers, certain more will come.

Recalling a study made by a colleague, Juliette deduces that perhaps the kid is infected by some kind of rare parasite similar to toxoplasmosis and if so, if they can find a way to kill the protozoa inside Daniel, the illness/behavior will stop and they could save him before more drastic actions are taken against him by 'The Council'. Alexander visits Monroe and Rosalee and they are forced to tell him the location of Daniel (though Monroe insists on informing Nick). Nick, Hank and Juliette rush to Daniel's room in the hospital but he'd already been discharged, his parents already taken him home. Alexander tries to kill Daniel but Daniel fights back and escapes to the woods. Due to the low temperature, the parasitic organisms perish and Daniel returns to normal. Nick decides to release Alexander and gives him Daniel's medical report proclaiming him cured. Alexander gives the records to De Groot while Nick writes his notes on the diaries, adding that: Subsequent tests proved that hypothermia is able to kill the unicellular eukaryotic organism, identified as Daemoni Adspicio, which is the cause of 'Grausen'.

== Reception ==
=== Viewers ===
The episode was viewed by 6.32 million people, earning a 1.6/5 in the 18-49 rating demographics on the Nielson ratings scale, ranking second on its timeslot and fourth for the night in the 18-49 demographics, behind Frosty the Snowman, Bones, and Shark Tank. This was a 10% increase in viewership from the previous episode, which was watched by 5.73 million viewers with a 1.3/4. This means that 1.6 percent of all households with televisions watched the episode, while 5 percent of all households watching television at that time watched it. With DVR factoring in, the episode was watched by 9.46 million viewers with a 2.9 ratings share in the 18-49 demographics.

=== Critical reviews ===
"Stories We Tell Our Young" received positive reviews. The A.V. Club's Kevin McFarland gave the episode a "B+" grade and wrote, "The premise for 'Stories We Tell Our Young' didn't look promising. Grimm had already dealt with a case involving a church last year in 'The Good Shepherd' that amounted to one of the worst episodic tangents of the season. And nothing makes The Exorcist look terrifying like lame network television appropriating the bare bones of an exorcism plot, which is what every promo suggested. But 'Stories' is actually a perfect example of how much Grimm has grown in the past few years. It takes small elements of previous episodes that either felt incomplete on their own or simply didn't work and blends them into a much stronger story that doesn't need a direct fairy tale equivalent in order to build out the world of the show to include larger forces."

Nick McHatton from TV Fanatic, gave a 3.9 star rating out of 5, stating: "The 'Grausen' is a very interesting take on what's become standard Grimm fare, and it's a pathogen that so rarely infects a human that the Wesen, Grimms, and Royals all got together to banish the victim – thinking they were possessed. I've really come to enjoy the episodes that expand the scope and richness of the world; these entries might not propel the main plot forward, but they do expose the history. In a show that gives ancestry and past generations so much weight and value expanding the canvas with the personalities, thoughts, whims, and knowledge of the prior generations is appreciated."

MaryAnn Sleasman from TV.com, wrote, "After last week's surprisingly underwhelming (sorry!) 'El Cucuy,' this week's 'Stories We Tell Our Young' seemed to have everything, swiftly putting Grimm back on track with its big theme for the season sans zombie-flashback-Nick. Renard is being all sneaky in Vienna while Hank and Nick hold down the fort Stateside. And 'Stories We Tell Our Young' was another one of those old-ways-vs.-new-ways episodes, but since those tend to be so good, I don't really mind that out of six episodes this season, maybe like four of them have shared the same general message. I love it when Grimm delves deeper into Wesen and Grimm history, culture, and norms—the lack of which, in the past, had always stopped me from thinking of Grimm as a great show, rather than a merely good show."
