= I Hate the Man in My Basement =

- Directed by: Dustin Cook
- Written by: Dustin Cook
- Starring: Chris Marquette; Nora-Jane Noone; Manny Montana
- Distributed by: Gravitas Ventures
- Release date: March 10, 2020
- Running time: 103 minutes
- Country: United States
- Language: English

I Hate the Man in My Basement is a 2020 American crime comedy drama film written and directed by Dustin Cook and starring Chris Marquette, Nora-Jane Noone and Manny Montana.

== Cast ==
- Chris Marquette as Claude
- Manny Montana as Logan
- Nora-Jane Noone as Kyra
- Jeffrey Doornbos as Riley

== Release ==
The film was released on March 10, 2020.

== Reception ==
The film has a 100% rating on Rotten Tomatoes based on five reviews.

Alan Ng of Film Threat rated the film a 7 out of 10, calling it "a fun thrill ride that needs sharper twists and turns to match the intensity of the exciting plot idea presented."
