= El Cucuy =

- Grimm episode
- Episode no.: Season 3 Episode 5
- Directed by: John Behring
- Written by: Michael Golamco
- Cinematography by: Marshall Adams
- Editing by: George Pilkinton
- Production code: 305
- Original air date: November 29, 2013
- Running time: 42 minutes

Guest appearances
- Manny Montana as David Florez; Gina Gallego as Mrs. Garcia; Bertila Damas as Pilar; Matt McTighe as Ray Bolton; Christian Lagadec as Sebastien; Robert Blanche as Sgt. Franco

Episode chronology
← Previous "One Night Stand"	Next → "Stories We Tell Our Young"
- Grimm season 3

"El Cucuy" is the 5th episode of the supernatural drama television series Grimm of season 3 and the 49th overall, which premiered on November 29, 2013, on the cable network NBC. The episode was written by Michael Golamco, and was directed by John Behring.

== Plot ==
Opening quote: "Duérmete niño, duérmete ya... Que viene el Coco y te comerá." ("Sleep child, sleep now... Or else the Bogeyman will come and eat you.")

Two weeks ago, a man named Andres Venegas (Garrett Hammond) is attacked in a gas station by two robbers, who severely wound him. In the hospital, his mother watches over him and makes a plea so the robbers don't get away and get punished for their actions. In a motel, a clawed creature watches the news reporting the attack and scratches the chair it’s sitting on.

Juliette (Bitsie Tulloch) has found out about the known "M" in Nick's (David Giuntoli) email and confronts him about it. He tells her it's his mother and then explains everything about her and although the email shows that she's in trouble, he can't do anything to help her. Juliette later tracks the call to Višnja Gora, Slovenia. In Vienna, Sebastien (Christian Lagadec) spies on Adalind (Claire Coffee) getting an ultrasound and sends Meisner (Damien Puckler) to get her medical records in secret and then sends the images to Renard (Sasha Roiz), shocking him.

The same robbers attack a store and when trying to escape in a car, are killed by the clawed creature. Nick and Hank (Russell Hornsby) find that they robbed a store so they head there where a man named David Florez (Manny Montana) yells at them for not doing their job. The neighbourhood heard the attack but calls it a dog attack. Upon questioning witnesses, they find a man named Ray Bolton (Matt McTighe) who uses his dogs for fights. It's also revealed that the robbers were in collaboration with Bolton.

Nick and Hank arrive at Bolton's house where he is restrained to let his dogs be taken. When he senses that Nick is a Grimm, Bolton attacks him, forcing Nick to arrest him while Florez again appears to state that it was time he be arrested. In the precinct, the samples reveal that the dogs were not related to the murders. While at dinner with Juliette, Monroe (Silas Weir Mitchell) and Rosalee (Bree Turner), Nick deduces that Bolton is a Höllentier, as he showed no fear of him.

A woman, Ms. Ramos (Fernanda Stier) is then assaulted in the street by a man but the clawed creature kills the man and leaves. When questioning the woman, she states "El Cucuy" is the one who killed the men. That night, Juliette tells Nick that "El Cucuy" is a Mexican Boogeyman. Nick and Juliette then asks Pilar (Bertila Damas) about it. She explains it's a yellow-eyed creature that hears the cries of a woman but is not clear if it's a Wesen.

New footage reveals that another person left with Ms. Ramos: Ms. Garcia (Gina Gallego), one of the witnesses. Bolton and his gang attack Florez and Florez returns to his house to grab his military uniform and a knife and leaves. Nick and Hank take Ms. Garcia but stop to halt the fight between Florez and Bolton. Nick and Hank take Florez but Ms. Garcia is missing. El Cucuy kills Bolton and shifts to its human form, revealing itself to be Ms. Garcia, who senses that Nick is a Grimm. They arrest her but due to the incredibility of the story of an old lady being the savage murderer, she is released. She is later seen in Seattle where a man robs her purse and she begins to shift into El Cucuy to pursue him.

== Reception ==
=== Viewers ===
The episode was viewed by 5.73 million people, earning a 1.3/4 in the 18-49 rating demographics on the Nielson ratings scale, ranking second on its timeslot and fourth for the night in the 18-49 demographics, behind Shrek the Halls, Dr. Seuss' How the Grinch Stole Christmas!, and Garth Brooks: Live From Las Vegas. This was a 2% decrease in viewership from the previous episode, which was watched by 5.81 million viewers with a 1.6/5. This means that 1.3 percent of all households with televisions watched the episode, while 4 percent of all households watching television at that time watched it. With DVR factoring in, the episode was watched by 8.72 million viewers with a 2.6 ratings share in the 18-49 demographics.

=== Critical reviews ===
"El Cucuy" received positive reviews. The A.V. Club's Kevin McFarland gave the episode a "B+" grade and wrote, "I liked 'El Cucuy' a lot despite some of the on the nose signaling that the episode was inspired by a Spanish legend. Last year's 'La Llorona' episode got special promotion around Halloween, and that Mexican legend was one of the best standalone stories of the second season. 'El Cucuy' doesn't have much significance to the larger arc of the show—except for the very brief interludes with Adalind's first ultrasound and Renard receiving video evidence of the baby—but what makes it so fun is how differently the case plays out when compared to the regular structure."

Nick McHatton from TV Fanatic, gave a 3.9 star rating out of 5, stating: "Justice comes in many different forms. For Grimm Season 3 Episode 5 justice is best served by El Cucuy, a nomadic, old lady roaming the world listening to the pleas of the disenfranchised. Serving out justice by brutally slashing some throats. So it's not quite the DC or Marvel origin story, but it's not lacking in flair."

MaryAnn Sleasman from TV.com, wrote, "While 'El Cucuy' didn't quite continue the 'old world vs. new world' thing that Grimm has had going on this season, the episode did feature some nice line-blurring between right and wrong, justice and vengeance. You can't really deny that El Cucuy's victims were all raging dickbags who kind of deserved what they got, but at the same time, society tends to frown upon a vigilante. Unless, of course, you're Batman—but even that's not guaranteed, depending on what flavor of Batman we're talking about."
