= Good Girls (TV series) =

American crime comedy-drama TV series

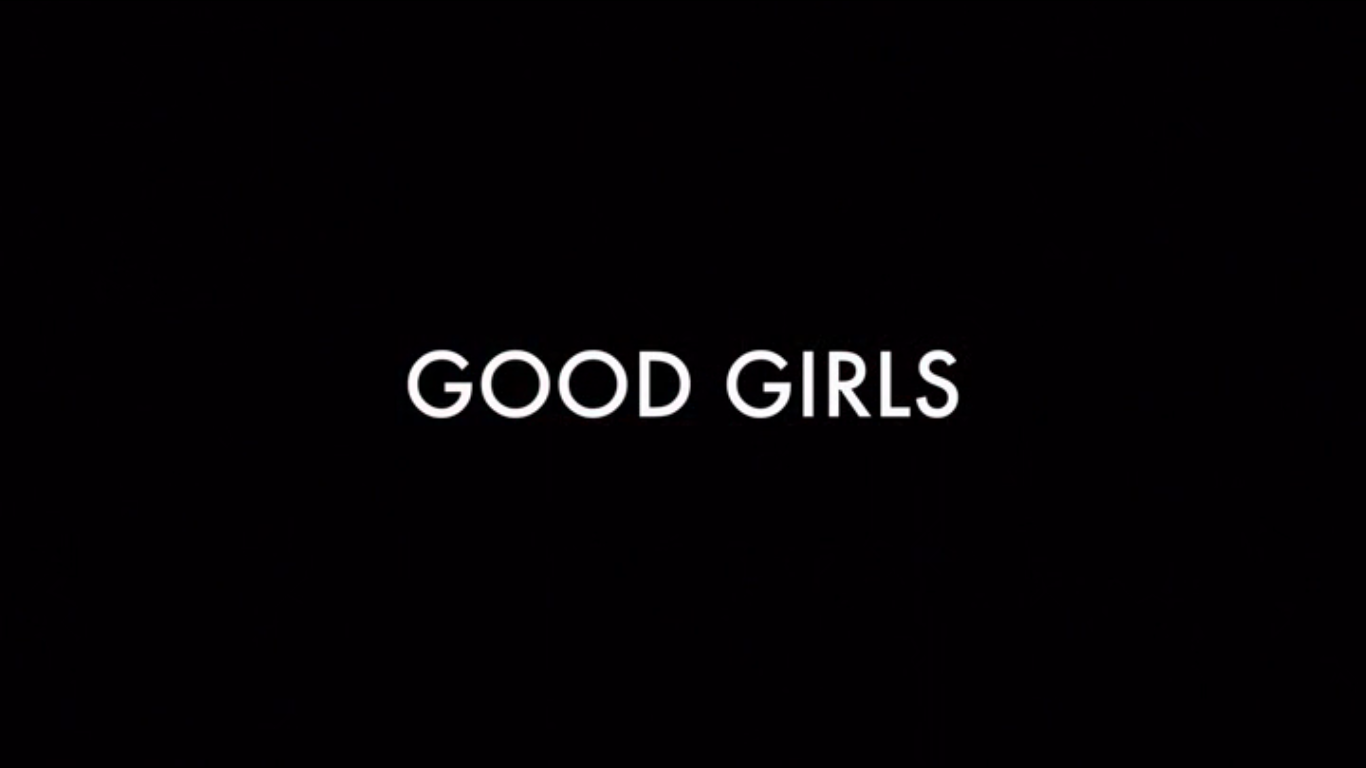
- Genre: Crime; Comedy drama
- Created by: Jenna Bans
- Starring: Christina Hendricks; Retta; Mae Whitman; Reno Wilson; Manny Montana; Lidya Jewett; Isaiah Stannard; Matthew Lillard
- Composers: Michael Penn; Lyle Workman; Ian Hultquist; Sofia Hultquist
- Country of origin: United States
- Original language: English
- No. of seasons: 4
- No. of episodes: 50

Production
- Executive producers: Jenna Bans; Dean Parisot; Jeannine Renshaw; Bill Krebs; Mark Wilding; Carla Banks Waddles; Michael Weaver
- Cinematography: Jerzy Zieliński; Darren Genet; Robert Reed Altman; Tim Bellen; Jason Oldak
- Editors: Brad Katz; Todd Gerlinger; Shoshanah Tanzer; Kenneth LaMere; Maura Corey; Franky Guttman; Tony Orcena
- Camera setup: Single-camera
- Running time: 40–44 minutes
- Production companies: Minnesota Logging Company; Universal Television
- Budget: $37+ million (season 2) (Note: This amount represents the total qualified expenditures for the California Film & Television Tax Credit and excludes other non-qualifying costs.); $43+ million (season 3)

Original release
- Network: NBC
- Release: February 26, 2018 – July 22, 2021

Good Girls is an American crime comedy drama television series that follows the lives of three suburban mothers who resort to robbing a supermarket and get involved with a crime boss and the FBI. The series was created by Jenna Bans and aired for four seasons on NBC, from February 26, 2018, to July 22, 2021. It stars Christina Hendricks, Retta, and Mae Whitman as the main characters, along with a supporting cast that includes Reno Wilson, Manny Montana, Lidya Jewett, Isaiah Stannard, and Matthew Lillard. The series was executive-produced by Bans, Dean Parisot, and Jeannine Renshaw, for Universal Television. In June 2021, NBC announced that the show was canceled after four seasons.

== Synopsis ==
The series follows three suburban Michigan mothers, Beth, Ruby and Annie, who are each experiencing various financial difficulties. They decide to pull off an unlikely heist, robbing a local supermarket, in order to help mitigate their money problems. Their successful robbery attracts the attention of the store manager after he recognizes Annie as one of the robbers, and of gang leader Rio, who was using the supermarket as a front to store and launder counterfeit money. The mothers subsequently find themselves caught in a series of gang heists, debts, secrets, and familial crises.

== Cast and characters ==
=== Main ===
- Christina Hendricks as Elizabeth "Beth" Boland, a mother of four and housewife whose car salesman husband of 20 years cheated on her. She is the unofficial leader of the group and grows to enjoy life as a criminal.
- Retta as Ruby Hill, Beth's best friend, a waitress who is struggling to pay for her daughter Sara's kidney disease and medical treatments.
- Mae Whitman as Annie Marks, Beth's younger sister and mother to Ben/Sadie. Ben/Sadie was born when Annie was still a teenager. Annie works at Fine & Frugal for a majority of the series.
- Reno Wilson as Stanley Hill, Ruby's mall-cop-turned-actual-cop husband. He finds out about Ruby's criminal activities and, despite initially being against it, does his best to ensure she is not caught.
- Manny Montana as Christopher, also known as Rio, a high-ranking criminal who has a money-laundering business. He supports his business through counterfeiting, pills, cars and other creative ways. He takes a particular interest in Beth, forming a complicated relationship with her.
- Lidya Jewett as Sara Hill, Ruby's and Stan's daughter who has kidney disease.
- Isaiah Stannard as Ben Marks (Sadie Marks), Annie and Gregg's son, who comes out as a trans boy in season 2. Before Ben came out as transgender and changed his name, he was referred to by his given name, Sadie.
- Matthew Lillard as Dean Boland, Beth's cheating car salesman husband who made bad decisions with their money, forcing her to rob a grocery store to fix his mistakes. Dean was a senior in high school when he asked Beth to go to their prom together, beginning their long-term relationship.

=== Recurring ===
- David Hornsby as Leslie "Boomer" Peterson (seasons 1–2, guest season 3), Annie's deplorable boss at Fine & Frugal. Leslie pursues a relationship with Mary Pat by attending her church and running into her in planned ways.
- James Lesure as FBI Agent Jimmy Turner (seasons 1–2, guest season 3), who is investigating Rio and, later, the women. He forms a fixation on specifically arresting Beth.
- June Squibb as Marion Peterson (seasons 1–2), Leslie's grandmother from whom he was stealing. She and Annie form an unexpected bond.
- Zach Gilford as Gregg, Ben's father and Annie's ex-husband who was trying to sue for full custody. He has an affair with Annie despite his wife, Nancy, being pregnant, later leaving Nancy because he is still in love with Annie.
- Sally Pressman as Nancy (seasons 1–2, guest seasons 3–4), Gregg's wife who gives birth to a boy named Dakota after Gregg leaves her.
- Allison Tolman as Mary Pat (seasons 1–2), an unlikely wolf in sheep's clothing who complicates the ladies' lives.
- Braxton Bjerken as Kenny Boland (seasons 1–4), as Beth's and Dean's eldest son.
- Danny Boyd as Harry Hill as Ruby's and Stan's son.
- Mason Shea Joyce as Danny Boland (seasons 2–4), Beth's and Dean's son. Portrayed by Sutton Johnston in season 1.
- Everleigh McDonell as Jane Boland (seasons 2–4), Beth's and Dean's daughter. Portrayed by Mila Middleswarth in season 1.
- Scarlett Abinante as Emma Boland (seasons 2–4), Beth's and Dean's daughter. Portrayed by Kaitlyn Oechsle in season 1.
- Caleb Emery as Baby Tyler (seasons 1–2, guest seasons 3–4)
- Sam Huntington as Noah (season 2), Annie's love interest. He is an undercover FBI agent who, in order to get close to Annie, poses as her new Fine & Frugal boss after Boomer's disappearance.
- Noureen DeWulf as Krystal (seasons 3–4), a stripper who appears to have a crush on Stanley. Her real name is Diane.
- Rob Heaps as Dr. Josh Cohen (season 3, guest season 4), a child psychologist attending Annie
- Ethan Suplee as Gil (season 3), a former inmate working for a moving company. Beth enlists him to move the printed cash.
- Carlos Aviles as Mick (seasons 3–4)
- Ione Skye as Gayle Meyer (season 3)
- Lauren Lapkus as Phoebe Donnegan (seasons 3–4), a Secret Service agent who has been tracking the printed counterfeit cash
- Rodney To as Henry (season 3, guest season 4)
- Andrew McCarthy as Mr. Fitzpatrick (season 4, guest season 3)
- Jonathan Silverman as Dave (season 4)
- Shane Coffey as Kevin (season 4, guest season 3)
- Niko Nicotera as Gene (season 4), Stan's boss at the strip club.
- Breckin Meyer as Vance (season 4)
- Ignacio Serricchio as Nick (season 4)
- Jordan Belfi as Z (season 4)

== Episodes ==
=== Series overview ===
Season	Episodes	Originally released	
Season	Episodes	First released	Last released
1	10	February 26, 2018	April 30, 2018
2	13	March 3, 2019	May 26, 2019
3	11	February 16, 2020	May 3, 2020
4	16	March 7, 2021	July 22, 2021

=== Season 1 (2018) ===
No. overall	No. in season	Title	Directed by	Written by	Original release date	U.S. viewers (millions)
1	1	"Pilot"	Dean Parisot	Jenna Bans	February 26, 2018	5.98
A Fine & Frugal grocery store is robbed by three masked women. Flashbacks show Beth Boland is a mother of four and her husband Dean owns a car dealership. Her sister Annie works at the Fine & Frugal and is a single mother. Her ex-husband Gregg plans to sue for custody of their child, Sadie, which she can't afford. Their friend, Ruby, works as a waitress and is the mother of two children, one of whom is ill and needs expensive medication. Beth finds out Dean is having an affair, took out several mortgages and is about to lose their house. Desperate for money, the ladies rob the store and make away with an unexpected $500,000. Afterward, Beth finds gang members in her house, led by crime boss Rio. They were housing their money at the grocery and demand it back. The ladies attempt to recoup the money but are short. Annie's boss, Boomer, reveals he knows she committed the robbery due to recognizing her tattoo. He wants sexual favors in exchange for his silence. When he attempts to rape Annie, Beth overhears and angrily confronts him. When he threatens to go to the police, Beth attacks him and he falls through a glass table, lying motionless.
2	2	"Mo Money, Mo Problems"	Alberto Del Rey	Jeannine Renshaw	March 5, 2018	5.36
Beth and Annie reveal to Ruby that they are holding Boomer captive in Beth's backyard in the children's tree house. When the ladies meet at the diner to discuss how to pay the gang back, Rio tells them they have until the next day to pay them. Ruby comes up with a plan to ransom Boomer and get his wealthy grandmother Marion to pay. They attempt to break in, but discover that she is home. Pretending to be home helpers, they snoop around the apartment, but Beth refuses to steal. Rio and the gang show up the next day, and the ladies try to appeal to him with antique figurines Annie stole from Marion. Upon seeing his violent reaction and fearing death, Beth makes an impassioned plea that saves their lives. Shortly afterward, Boomer breaks out of the tree-house. When they find him, Annie takes a picture of his genitals and pretends to send the photo to her daughter. She threatens to go to the police if he exposes them. Later, Beth finds Rio in her backyard. He requests Beth's help and asks if she and the ladies have passports.
3	3	"Borderline"	Kenneth Fink	Jenna Lamia	March 12, 2018	4.46
Beth explains to the ladies that Rio wants them to travel to Canada and bring a package back for him. In exchange, he will clear them of their debt. In need of a car, the ladies steal one from Dean's dealership, unaware of Boomer following them. Once they get to Canada, the man who is supposed to give them the package refuses to do so. Ruby decides to scare him with Stan's gun, but accidentally shoots him in the foot. After getting the package, they are pulled over at the border and subjected to a vehicle search. They pass the search and discover the package they obtained contains wrapping paper with counterfeit money printed inside. They bring the money to Rio's warehouse, and he tells them their debt is cleared. Later, Dean informs Beth that the cops have been notified about the car missing from his lot. The ladies decide to drown the car in a nearby lake. Later that night, Beth calls Rio for a private discussion.
4	4	"Atom Bomb"	Dean Parisot	Nicole Paulhus	March 19, 2018	4.07
Beth discovers one of Rio's associates wounded in her daughter's bed. Rio tells the ladies he will pay them if they let his friend hide out there. But upon waking up, the confused man leaves in a frenzy. Beth's son wants a lavish birthday party and Dean promises him one. Ruby deals with a rude customer and, when he burns his hand on a skillet, is accused of neglect. Refusing to apologize, Ruby is fired. Sadie tells Annie that boys at school have been pulling her pants down, asking her "what she is". Boomer takes his suspicions about the ladies to the FBI, who dismiss him. At the birthday party, Rio shows up and refuses to pay the ladies since they didn't actually complete the task. Boomer, having dropped the cake off, runs into Rio. He takes a picture and sends it to the FBI. The ladies offer to clean Rio's fake cash in exchange for 12.5% of the cut, to which he agrees. Dean tells Beth that he has cancer. Later, FBI Agent Turner shows up at Beth's home with questions.
5	5	"Taking Care of Business"	Sarah Pia Anderson	Des Moran	March 26, 2018	4.28
FBI Agent Turner asks the Bolands if they have noticed any suspicious activity in the neighborhood and Beth says no. Shortly thereafter, bags of money that need to be cleaned show up in the trunks of the ladies' cars. They meet with Rio and discuss their concerns about the FBI. He dismisses their worries and tells them they have to find a way to pay him back. The ladies execute their plan to buy a large amount of appliances with the fake cash. Annie meets an employee at the electronics store and has a one-night stand with him. He leaves in the middle of the night, taking her receipt with him. After tracking him to his apartment, the ladies discover he is married and he threw the receipt away to hide any evidence. The ladies weed through the trash and find the receipt. Agent Turner visits the Bolands again and shows Beth a picture of Rio. She initially denies knowing him, but says she will explain when her kids are not around. Ruby's daughter has a seizure and they find out that she has not been taking her medication. Beth claims that she had a one-night stand with Rio to Agent Turner, explaining how she supposedly knows him.
6	6	"A View from the Top"	So Yong Kim	Marc Halsey	April 2, 2018	4.04
The FBI finds the car in the lake. Ruby thinks the ladies should quit laundering money and explain to Rio that they want out; Beth instead asks for more money to launder. The ladies bring in help to clean the money faster, using the cover of a secret-shopper ring. Agent Turner visits Dean and tells him that Beth stole the car from his dealership. Dean covers for his wife, but confronts her about it and merely assumes she was taken advantage of by Rio. After Annie's coworker loses $20,000 worth of merchandise, the ladies have to steal the merchandise back so they aren't short on their next payment. Ruby's old boss stops by the house, alerting Stan to the fact that Ruby has been lying to him. She comes clean to Stan by showing him her cut of the money and using the secret-shopper scam as a cover. Boomer buys a large amount of drugs and plants them in Annie's work locker. Annie comes clean to Marion about stealing from her, who only wants to know if she had a good reason. Beth tells Dean that she willingly agreed to the illegal work she did, fed up with his naive image of her.
7	7	"Special Sauce"	Sharat Raju	Bill Krebs	April 9, 2018	4.28
Dean confronts Beth over her actual work, but she refuses to give him any information. The ladies expand the secret-shopper cover so they can clean the money even faster. The FBI picks up the gang member that previously stayed at the Bolands' and coerce him into helping with their case against Rio. Rio and his crew unexpectedly show up at Beth's and reveal that fake bills were slipped in with the real cash. The ladies confess their secret-shopper scam and Rio demands the name of the person who cheated him so he can "handle it". Instead, the ladies devise a plan to catch the person. Annie gets arrested when she returns to work and discovers the drugs Boomer planted in her locker. The ladies figure out that single mom Mary Pat has been turning the fake money back in. She figures out the secret shopping is a scam and blackmails the ladies into giving her $10,000. Gregg and Annie unexpectedly bond and end up sleeping together. After giving Mary Pat the money she requested, she tells them that she wants that same amount every month going forward.
8	8	"Shutdown"	Nzingha Stewart	Mark Wilding	April 16, 2018	4.24
Beth realizes all the fake money she has been storing is missing. She meets with Rio, who tells her that he is temporarily shutting down his operation due to pressure from the FBI. The ladies are forced to return to their "old" lives for income. One month later, the ladies are short of their next payment to Mary Pat. At Sarah's soccer game, Mary Pat spots Ruby and Stan and hints she will go to the police if she does not get paid. The ladies decide to commit another robbery to get the cash. Ruby finds out Sarah has been shoplifting at school and takes her to the local police station so she can be "scared straight". After gleaning information from Nancy about her spas, the ladies each target a spa and make off with a large amount of injectables. Upon failing to move the product, however, Beth confides in Dean about the situation. He takes the product to a doctor friend of his and is able to move the injectables. While visiting Stan at work, Ruby learns that Rio's gang associate who stayed at the Bolands' is the one helping the police. She relays this information to the ladies, who contemplate what to do next.
9	9	"Summer of the Shark"	Michael Weaver	Bill Krebs & Jeannine Renshaw	April 23, 2018	3.95
The ladies discuss telling Rio that his associate, Eddie, flipped on him to the FBI. When Rio asks them to pick up some trucks for him, the ladies are unsure. Ruby decides to get stoned with Stan and inquire if the cops know about the trucks. Assured that the police don't know anything, the ladies go through with the plan and each drive off in a truck. However, Beth is pulled over and, believing she will be arrested, instructs the ladies to look after her kids. After seeing Mary Pat at the store and Annie paying for her groceries, Boomer gets more information on her. Later, he attends Mary Pat's church and sparks a conversation with her, leading him back to her house. While alone, he sets up a recording device in her living room. Beth learns she was pulled over due to the truck not having a license plate, barely talking herself out of an arrest. She angrily confronts Rio, who reveals it was a test to see if she would talk to the cops. Beth lashes out at him, who then declares their partnership to be over. Convinced that Rio will kill them to cover his tracks, the ladies decide to flip on him.
10	10	"Remix"	Sarah Pia Anderson	Jenna Bans	April 30, 2018	4.04
While the ladies ponder ways to turn Rio in without incriminating themselves, Rio meets with Agent Turner and threatens him. With a kidney available for Sara, Ruby and Stan intentionally write a bad check. Later, Annie devises a plan to rob the grocery store again as a means to get the money for Ruby while also leading the FBI to Rio's illegal business. This time, Annie stays on duty to help Ruby secure the cash. Annie is caught by Tyler, but she tells everyone he heroically saved her in exchange for his silence. Mary Pat finds the recording device Boomer planted in her house and goes to Beth, who tells her the type of person Boomer is. Dean carelessly gets into a car accident and, at the hospital, Beth finds out he lied about having cancer. She then sees on a nearby television that Rio has been arrested. Ruby pays for the kidney surgery and Stan confronts her about robbing the grocery store. Beth returns home to find Rio waiting for her, who was released on bail, and a beaten Dean at his side. He gives Beth a gun and tells her to pull the trigger if she wants to be "the boss".

=== Season 2 (2019) ===
No. overall	No. in season	Title	Directed by	Written by	Original release date	U.S. viewers (millions)
11	1	"I'd Rather Be Crafting"	Michael Weaver	Bill Krebs	March 3, 2019	2.75
Beth cleans up the mess from the bloody aftermath of Rio's gun challenge to her. Stan chooses to sleep on the couch, disgusted by Ruby's criminal actions. The grocery store crime scene reveals a potential new piece of evidence against Beth. Boomer annoys Agent Turner, but then decides to lean on Beth to get her to confess. The ladies devise a scheme to intercept the evidence, but their own moral values kick in when they realize the cost that ruining the evidence would bring. Stan chooses family over his career. Annie and Gregg continue their antics, almost blowing their cover to Sadie. Dean is depressed, knowing he will require a long recovery. Boomer blackmails Mary Pat in a most unique way. Rio reminds the ladies of a problem they have that must be dealt with, giving them a tool that may help.
12	2	"Slow Down, Children at Play"	Michael Weaver	Jeannine Renshaw	March 10, 2019	2.46
The ladies choose to punish Boomer, which overwhelms Beth and disappoints Annie. Dean's depression continues but he still gripes about the missing stop sign in front of their house. Agent Turner gets suspicious that Boomer may have been threatened. Dean chooses to go back to work. Annie attends Gregg and Nancy's gender reveal party, initially having an epiphany about how to raise money but later finding herself starting to bond with Nancy. Mary Pat starts to get nervous as her wedding approaches, annoying Annie. Stan and Ruby start to reconcile. Gregg and Annie's affair is finally exposed. Beth chooses to resolve the stop sign problem on her own. With Rio holding a gun to her, Beth admits her failures to him, awaiting the consequences.
13	3	"You Have Reached the Voicemail of Leslie Peterson"	Dylan K. Massin	Emily Halpern & Sarah Haskins	March 17, 2019	2.36
Instead of harming her, Rio chooses to give Beth some advice. The ladies try to track down the whereabouts of Boomer, enlisting the help of Mary Pat. Annie chooses to be the one to do the deed given her personal history with him. Mary Pat gets a surprise visit from Boomer who in turn gets a surprise himself. Ruby gets an idea from Sara's schoolwork as to how to get out of the ladies' current dilemma. The ladies deal with guilt regarding their latest activity. Mary Pat goes to Agent Turner about Boomer. Beth and Dean talk about "the book club". Ruby makes a confession to Stan. Rio mails Beth a key, leading to a storage locker.
14	4	"Pick Your Poison"	Phil Traill	Jenna Lamia	March 24, 2019	2.31
Beth reveals the content of the storage locker to Annie and Ruby, who contemplate what to do with it. Rio tells Beth he has given her "the keys to the kingdom" since he plans to "move on" from money laundering but admits he sees potential in her to "be something". Annie takes it upon herself to be Marion's personal caretaker to help ease her guilt but learns a few surprising details. Her affair with Gregg also comes to a head. Ruby and Stan deal with the repercussions of her taking out a loan. Beth finds herself in another financial hole because of Dean, and her attraction to Rio reaches a new level. Agent Turner pays a visit to Mary Pat, where one of her children makes an innocent yet incriminating comment. Rio makes a sudden appearance at the Boland dealership, declaring his intention to make it the new place for his money-laundering business. Dean and Beth are forced to reluctantly agree when he begins violently destroying the dealership Corvettes.
15	5	"Everything Must Go"	Michael Spiller	Carla Banks Waddles	March 31, 2019	2.16
Ruby confesses to Stan about burying Boomer's body, to which he tries to ensure they did nothing to incriminate themselves. However, he learns there is an unknown witness to their crime, making the ladies panic that Mary Pat is flipping on them. The ladies ask Rio to handle the situation without actually killing Mary Pat, to which he agrees for $200,000. Desperate for the money, the ladies ask Amber for help. This leads Beth to discover another secret about Dean, making her second-guess everything about her marriage again. Annie discovers a shocking secret about Beth, causing the two sisters to fight. Agent Turner turns the heat on Mary Pat, who throws Ruby and Stan under the bus to save herself. He approaches Beth and offers her a deal if she turns on Annie and Ruby, which she refuses. Annie reels from guilt over ruining Gregg and Nancy's marriage and its emotional effect on Sadie, leading her to confess her role in it. Beth agrees to "start over" with Dean, but on the condition he take on the role as homemaker while she handles the Boland dealership herself.
16	6	"Take Off Your Pants"	Dean Parisot	Des Moran	April 7, 2019	2.39
Beth and Dean adapt to their household roles, with the latter struggling as a stay-at-home dad. Rio tells Beth to make a few car deliveries for him, but will not tell her what the deliveries actually are, much to her annoyance. Agent Turner visits Ruby and Stan for a tense family dinner, where he plays on Ruby's emotions to get her to confess to her criminal activities. Beth intentionally destroys one of Rio's cars and discovers pills hidden inside. She instructs the ladies to take the pills and "bleed Rio dry" in order to force him to share his cut with them. Annie struggles in her strained relationship with an angered Sadie, who is bitter about her affair with Gregg. A furious Rio confronts Beth and she strategically forces him to agree to her terms. Ruby, caving to Agent Turner's pressure, agrees to tell him whatever he wants. He tells Ruby he actually wants "Her", referring to Beth. Beth later attempts to have sex with Dean, where her cold attitude towards him allows Dean to realize she and Rio have been intimate. Angered, he begins seeking revenge against Rio and asks Kenny's Krav Maga instructor if he has ever killed someone.
17	7	"The Dubby"	So Yong Kim	Bill Krebs	April 14, 2019	2.39
Beth and Dean continue to struggle in their house roles, with Beth spending most of her time at work away from her children. Agent Turner pressures Ruby to give him evidence of Beth's criminal activities, threatening to send her and Stan to prison if she does not. Beth is forced to bring the kids with her on a delivery for Rio. However, her daughter Jane leaves her blanket behind, and the ladies go back to retrieve it, putting them in a dangerous situation. Dean, fed up with Rio's interference in his life, gets contact information about someone who can "take care" of him, but is warned of potential consequences. Annie meets her new store manager, Noah, with whom she quickly makes a connection. Her relationship with Sadie also makes slow but gradual healing progress. When Jane goes missing, Beth turns to Rio for help, who scolds her for her reckless attitude and demands she accept the dangerous reality of her life. Ruby finds Jane hiding in a closet. She also finds Beth's "Book Club" calendar for Rio's deliveries and makes a call for someone to meet her.
18	8	"Thelma and Louise"	Michael Weaver	Emily Halpern & Sarah Haskins	April 21, 2019	2.14
In flashbacks to 1990, it is shown how Beth and Annie met Ruby as children. Beth and Ruby make a strong connection, each supporting the other during bad times in their lives, beginning their bond as best friends. In the present, Ruby calls Beth and confesses about Agent Turner blackmailing her. Beth feels betrayed that Ruby would ever consider flipping on her, causing a fracture in their friendship. Annie and Noah continue their casual relationship, with Noah attempting to learn more about her life, when Sadie calls her to assist in Nancy's delivery of her baby. Dean attempts to put a hit on Rio, only to find out the hit men are just kids. He is conned and gets Beth's money stolen. Beth and the ladies devise a plan for Ruby to lie to Agent Turner, get the money back, and set the two kids up to take the fall. While succeeding in everything else, they fail to actually get the money back. Beth and Ruby argue about her near betrayal, but finally make amends. Beth comes home to discover that Dean has left her and took the kids with him, leaving her to be comforted by Ruby and Annie.
19	9	"One Last Time"	Tara Nicole Weyr	Carla Banks Waddles	April 28, 2019	2.34
Beth roughly adjusts to a life without her children, desperate for them back. Stan is arrested by Agent Turner in front of Ruby and their kids. Beth meets with Dean and asks what it will take to get her kids back; he tells her to end her association with Rio and her criminal life. She eventually agrees. Gregg meets Noah at Annie's apartment and gets a bad vibe about him, warning Annie to keep her distance. Desperate to get Stan out on bail, Ruby and the ladies arrange another robbery, which Beth decides will be her last. However, they run into unexpected problems and an unplanned kidnapping. Stan is eventually released, much to Ruby's joy. Beth talks to Rio about her family situation and, after bringing him back to her house, the two have sex. Afterward, she coldly tells him she is done with her criminal life and instructs him to leave, visibly upsetting him. Later that night, Dean returns home with the children, much to Beth's relief. Meeting Noah at a bar, Annie initially decides to distance herself from him. However, after he confesses to once stealing money, Annie decides to continue their relationship and tells him about the ladies' crimes.
20	10	"This Land Is Your Land"	Lee Friedlander	Jeannine Renshaw	May 5, 2019	2.25
Beth struggles to re-adapt to a homemaker life, but becomes increasingly frustrated. Annie and Ruby face financial trouble since leaving their criminal jobs behind. Desperate for money, they decide to secretly work for Rio on their own. They use Sara's girl scout group as a cover for smuggling a drug package from Canada. However, without Beth, they face unexpected difficulties and a few harsh truths come out. Meanwhile, Beth has her hard work on a bake sale dismissed by the PTA mothers and has an emotional breakdown. While at the park, Rio warns Beth that Agent Turner is about to raid the Boland dealership. She barely makes it in time to destroy a ledger containing records of the illegal business and Agent Turner shuts the dealership down. Beth admits that she misses her criminal life and the ladies realize that Agent Turner knew personal details of the drug business. Annie silently realizes that Noah works for Agent Turner, having told him this information herself.
21	11	"Hunting Season"	Ken Whittingham	Jenna Lamia	May 12, 2019	1.99
Rio begins sending Beth packages containing dead body parts as a message. Beth meets with him and is forced to resume washing cash when learning of Ruby and Annie's debt from their failed drug delivery. With no other options, the ladies resort to tedious ways to clean the cash. Dean figures out that Beth hasn't cut Rio from her life as promised and they file for divorce. Meanwhile, Ruby and Stan find an expensive lawyer who can get his charges dropped. Desperate, she uses the counterfeit cash as payment. Annie confesses to the ladies that Noah works for Agent Turner, and they suggest using him to their advantage. Desperate to get out from under Rio's thumb, they try to find Boomer's body. Learning that Fine & Frugal has a black market meat locker, Annie finds a wrapped body inside and assumes it to be Boomer's. They bury it in Beth's garden, only for the neighbor's dog to dig it back up. Beth quickly re–buries the partially uncovered body only to realize it is not Boomer.
22	12	"Jeff"	Andrew McCarthy	Mark Wilding & Jenna Lamia	May 19, 2019	2.35
Eight months prior, Mary Pat is happily married to Jeff, who receives disability checks. While playing with the kids, however, he unexpectedly dies. To keep his checks, she doesn't report his death and hides his body. Jumping forward to her running over Boomer, she hides his body behind the house only to find him gone later. The body she gave the ladies was Jeff's. In the present, Beth and Dean explain their divorce to the kids, who try to understand the situation. Annie reluctantly continues her relationship with Noah but soon reveals she knows he is FBI. Meanwhile, Agent Turner turns the heat on Ruby and Stan. They go to their lawyer for help but are dropped due to the counterfeit money Ruby paid with. The ladies track down Mary Pat, bring her to Beth's house and demand the truth. She explains her history to the ladies, who feel sympathetic, but frustrated about taking the fall for a murder they didn't commit. Annie becomes determined to find Boomer, finding evidence that Marion knows where he is. She finds Boomer alive and well hiding in Marion's attic.
23	13	"King"	Michael Weaver	Bill Krebs	May 26, 2019	2.26
The ladies try to convince Boomer to go to the police about being alive, but he refuses unless he is paid a large amount of money first. With Rio refusing to help and without other options, Beth falsely confesses to Boomer's murder to Agent Turner in order to spare Ruby and Stan. However, Boomer's grandmother convinces him to show himself, which invalidates the murder charge against Beth. Later that night, Beth is abducted while getting her phone from her car and finds herself in Rio's empty apartment. He has kidnapped Agent Turner as well and instructs her to kill him in order to rid him from her life. However, she instead turns against Rio and shoots him several times. She releases Agent Turner before running back home in a state of shock. While Rio slowly bleeds out, Agent Turner offers to call emergency services for him only if he "owes him one". Annie tries to know more about Noah's real past and life and finds out he might be transferred to Arizona since he ruined his case against her and the ladies. In the end, Beth celebrates her freedom with the ladies as she offers a new form of money laundering to them without Rio.

=== Season 3 (2020) ===
No. overall	No. in season	Title	Directed by	Written by	Original release date	U.S. viewers (millions)
24	1	"Find Your Beach"	Michael Weaver	Jenna Bans & Bill Krebs	February 16, 2020	1.97
Beth, Ruby, and Annie struggle with their new business venture following Rio's death. Struggling with guilt, Beth befriends Rio's child's mother with friendship and financial needs. The girls take side jobs to make ends meet. Beth meets a woman who specializes in graphic design and hires her to design their counterfeit dollar bills. Meanwhile, Agent Turner travels to his secure confidential informant, who is revealed to be Rio, who survived Beth's gunshot wound. Later, Rio goes back on his word and kills Turner to free the investigation against the girls.
25	2	"Not Just Cards"	Phil Traill	Carla Banks Waddles	February 23, 2020	1.81
Following Agent Turner's death, Beth and the girls are free to continue their money-laundering business. Beth learns the meaning of being the boss when one of her associates takes all of their cut. Annie makes the decision to begin therapy. At the end of the episode, Beth sits at a bar and to her shock Rio returns in her life.
26	3	"Egg Roll"	Lee Friedlander	Helen Childress	March 1, 2020	1.80
Following Rio's return, desperate to stay alive, Beth falsely announces that she's pregnant, leaving only time to figure out her next step. Meanwhile, Ruby and Stan figure out how her new business venture will work. Dean suffers backlash after pushing the brakes of a potential affair at work. Annie continues her therapy.
27	4	"The Eye In Survivor"	Dylan K. Massin	Greta Heinemann	March 8, 2020	1.91
As Beth and the girls continue the business, one of Rio's gang members parks in front of Beth's house to keep an eye on her. Later, Beth lies and tells Rio that she had lost the baby and is forced to reveal her money-laundering business to stay alive. Meanwhile, Ruby finds out that her daughter has pawned an expensive heirloom for money. Also, Annie's flirtatiousness backfires as her therapist becomes brutally honest with her. After finding out that Rio is alive, Dean buys a shotgun to try to take him out.
28	5	"Au Jus"	Andrew McCarthy	Chantelle M. Wells	March 15, 2020	1.90
Dean destroys one of Beth's money-printing plates out of anger and jealousy. Beth turns to Lucy yet again but she has gotten wise and declines. Unknown to Beth, Rio has been one step ahead of her and kidnaps Lucy. Rio demands that she make another plate for him. Meanwhile, Ruby begins to fear that Stan might leave her and feels that their marriage is "fading". Rio kills Lucy and keeps the girls alive since they keep bringing in money and Lucy will not.
29	6	"Frere Jacques"	Michael Weaver	Ester Lou Weithers	March 22, 2020	1.90
Lucy's boyfriend Max looks into her disappearance. Ruby learns that Stan has received news about an investigation into getting his job back. Both Stan and Ruby are hesitant because of their history. Annie begins seeing different therapists following the fallout from Dr. Cohen. The girls are eager to get into Lucy's phone but it is locked. They dig up Lucy's body and use her face to unlock it to reply to Max, who is very worried. Beth talks with Max later and makes him believe that she just dumped him; He gets over it. Dean takes Lucy's bird to the vet where he runs into Max. Max recognizes the bird immediately.
30	7	"Vegas Baby"	Andrew McCarthy	Helen Childress	March 29, 2020	1.98
Beth brings the women together to plan their next move when Lucy's boyfriend, Max, learns Lucy's fate and starts to seek revenge on Rio. The three women decide to rob a convenience store, but Ruby is accidentally shot in the leg. Meanwhile, Annie resumes her therapy sessions with Dr. Cohen. Also, Stan questions his current job situation.
31	8	"Nana"	Phil Traill	Greta Heinemann	April 5, 2020	1.84
After her furniture is stolen from her home, Beth asks Rio for another job in order to get back on his good side and back on his payroll. During their task, Beth discovers that the package to pick up is Boomer who had escaped from state prison. Later, when the girls travel to visit Boomer's grandmother, it is revealed that she had died, and Annie is asked to scatter her ashes. Meanwhile, Annie and Josh's relationship begins to deteriorate. Also, Stan tries to get on the same level as Ruby.
32	9	"Incentive"	Sara Zandieh	Chantelle M. Wells	April 19, 2020	1.75
Ruby scrambles and enlists the help from her daughter to replenish supplies after a federal agent discovers the girls' secret and issues a recall of the nail polish. Meanwhile, Beth comes up with a solution after Rio backs her into a corner. Annie makes headway in her therapy. Also, Dean receives an award at work for the most sales.
33	10	"Opportunity"	Michael Weaver	Carla Banks Waddles	April 26, 2020	1.58
Beth seeks the help from an expert marksman to take down Rio once and for all. A guilt-ridden Ruby and her family have dinner with the couple who donated their deceased daughter's kidney to Sara. The wife asks Ruby for a car. Meanwhile, Annie seeks help from Ben to study for her upcoming GED test. She fails and Josh takes her drinking to celebrate then confesses he proposed to his girlfriend.
34	11	"Synergy"	Dylan K. Massin	Vanessa Mancos & Jeremy Gordon	May 3, 2020	1.75
Upon hearing about Dean's recent affair and subsequent quitting his job, Beth and Dean together offer his employer to sell the business to them for Beth's money-laundering business. Meanwhile, Ruby comes up with an idea to wash money for their latest adventure and pay back Stan following an argument. Also, undercover detective Phoebe grows closer to the girls' case after she swipes Ruby's phone.

=== Season 4 (2021) ===
No. overall	No. in season	Title	Directed by	Written by	Original release date	U.S. viewers (millions)
35	1	"One Night in Bangkok"	Eric Galileo Tignini	Helen Childress & Bill Krebs	March 7, 2021	1.68
Desperate to get her new money-laundering system up and running, Beth asks Dean to open their hot tub business without any professional building inspection in order to get Rio's cut of the business. In doing so, they bribe a building inspector to overlook code violations. Meanwhile, after their son, Harry, misbehaves in class multiple times, Ruby and Stan consider a decision to test him for ADHD. After deciding not to throw Ben a birthday party because he says he has no friends, Annie learns that Ben has been lying to her when Ben's father tells her about the large party Ben had at his house.
36	2	"Big Kahuna"	Jennifer Arnold; Michael Weaver	Bill Krebs	March 14, 2021	1.51
As things start taking off at Boland Bubbles, Dean lands a big client, leading to his arrest for Beth's crimes. Meanwhile, Ruby and Stan are forced to relive the memories of the family that donated life to Sara. Also, Annie goes out of her way to try to fit in with Ben's rich friends' parents at a silent auction for charity.
37	3	"Fall Guy"	Michael Weaver	Ester Lou Weithers	March 21, 2021	1.53
Following Dean's arrest, Beth enlists Rio's help with bail. The women rally together to find a man willing to take the fall for Dean's alleged crimes to get him out of jail. Ruby asks for Stan's help with bail money, which causes Stan's boss to suspect him of stealing from the club. Annie grows further and further away from Ben.
38	4	"Dave"	Michael Weaver	Greta Heinemann & Mark Wilding	March 28, 2021	1.30
With the Secret Service closing in, Beth is forced to make a decision about whether to become a cooperative witness, or take matters into her own hands regarding freeing Dean from jail. Rio suspects that Beth had hired a hit-man to take him out. Meanwhile, Stan continues his dangerous jobs with his boss, Ruby considers the possibility of starting over with Stan in another state, and Beth is faced with a choice, either let the hit man make his move, or stop the hit and become a cooperating witness. Regardless of her choice, one must be taken out, and it falls in her hands to decide who. Also, Annie comes to terms with the fact that Ben is old enough that she no longer needs to parent him.
39	5	"The Banker"	Eric Galileo Tignini	Bill Krebs	April 11, 2021	1.53
With Rio close on her tail, Beth partners up with the Secret Service to come up with a plan to take down Rio. Meanwhile, Ruby grows suspicious of Stan when he lies about being at work when she shows up at his job. Also, Annie volunteers to watch Nancy's baby when she is called out of town.
40	6	"Grandma Loves Grisham"	Eric Galileo Tignini	Carla Banks Waddles	April 18, 2021	1.51
With business running slow, the women ask the secret service to be on their payroll in order to take down Rio for them. Meanwhile, Rio asks Beth to meet his work boss in order for her to join his empire. Ruby asks Stan to step up and ask his boss to sell more legit goods in order to retain a bigger profit. Annie secretly retakes the GED test and receives unexpected attention from her former therapist. Also, Dean looks into a new hobby.
41	7	"Carolyn with a Y"	Michael Weaver	Kris Baucom & Jacob Motz	May 2, 2021	1.39
Rio grows more suspicious of Beth when she brings on one of her friends, who is one of the secret service undercover, for more help to grow but really for Beth to set up Rio so the Secret Service can finally have evidence to capture Rio. Meanwhile, Gregg tells Annie that he is pulling Ben from his private school because he can no longer afford the tuition. Also, Stan is left in the dust when beginning a new career.
42	8	"Broken Toys"	Michael Weaver	Mark Wilding	May 9, 2021	1.42
Beth receives a visit from Rio's brother Nick and asks what are her intentions with Rio. Beth soon lays a trap for Rio to finally get arrested. Meanwhile, Rio reminisces his childhood with his brother and grandmother. Stan and Ruby turn in Stan's boss to the police. Dean gets roped into a scheme with his new friends.
43	9	"Chef Boyardee"	Eric Galileo Tignini	Samantha Taylor Pickett & Steven Rubinshteyn	May 16, 2021	1.43
After being forced to pick a side by the secret service, Beth makes the decision to work with Rio again. Meanwhile, Stan is increasingly more annoyed with how selfish Beth can be around him and Ruby. Meanwhile, Annie looks into resources in order to keep Ben in his private school. Also, Dean begins to have second thoughts about his new work opportunity.
44	10	"Strong Hearts Strong Sales"	Erin Feeley	Jenna Lamia	June 24, 2021	1.57
Things become more complicated for the women under Rio's thumb. Stan offers the ladies an unconventional idea. Annie's new living arrangement causes more problems than anticipated.
45	11	"Put It all on Two"	Eva Vives	Helen Childress	June 24, 2021	1.39
The trio must find a way to smuggle the fake cash, but things are further complicated when Stan gets involved. Annie reluctantly agrees to go to dinner with Kevin. Ruby discovers something horrifying. Beth and Dean reach a breaking point.
46	12	"Family First"	Eric Galileo Tignini	Ester Lou Weithers	July 1, 2021	1.43
A frustrated Rio takes matters into his own hands. More complications arise as the strip club undertakes some trouble. Dean forges an unexpected alliance with Stan.
47	13	"You"	Michael Weaver	Jeremy Gordon	July 8, 2021	1.61
Rio inserts himself in the girls' new business to Beth's dismay. Phoebe discovers a bombshell in the case and returns to Detroit.
48	14	"Thank You for Your Support"	Ken Whittingham	Vanessa Mancos	July 15, 2021	1.69
Beth runs for City Council as tensions rise between Nick and Rio. Nancy, down on her luck, offers Annie some unlikely relationship advice. Ruby becomes suspicious of Stan's new venture.
49	15	"We're Even"	Sara Zandieh	Mark Wilding & Jenna Lamia	July 22, 2021	1.53
The girls are forced into a heist by the Secret Service. Ruby tries to repair Beth and Stan's relationship. Rio offers an unexpected proposal. Stan and Dean form an alliance.
50	16	"Nevada"	Michael Weaver	Helen Childress & Ester Lou Weithers	July 22, 2021	1.68

== Production ==
=== Development and Cancellation ===
On May 7, 2018, NBC renewed the series for a second season, which premiered on March 3, 2019. On April 12, 2019, NBC renewed the series for a third season of 16 episodes, which premiered on February 16, 2020. Because of the COVID-19 pandemic in the United States, the third season was cut down to 11 episodes. On May 15, 2020, the series was renewed for a fourth season, which premiered on March 7, 2021. In May 2021, NBC considered renewing the series for a shortened fifth and final season conditional on the series regulars receiving pay cuts; series regulars Christina Hendricks, Mae Whitman, and Retta agreed to the terms while Manny Montana did not. One month later on June 25, 2021, NBC canceled the series after four seasons and opted to not shop to other networks.

=== Casting ===
Originally, Kathleen Rose Perkins was cast in the role of Beth in the pilot. Later it was confirmed she had left the project and the role would be recast. Christina Hendricks was announced as her replacement on July 10, 2017. On September 17, 2019, Jackie Cruz was cast in a recurring role for the third season. On November 13, 2020, Jonathan Silverman was cast in a recurring role for the fourth season. On April 13, 2021, Jordan Belfi joined the cast in a recurring role for the fourth season.

=== Filming ===
The first season was filmed at Third Rail Studios in Doraville, Georgia. For the second season, the series relocated its production to Los Angeles to take advantage of tax incentives provided by the California Film Commission under its "Program 2.0" initiative.

== Reception ==
=== Ratings ===
==== Overall ====
Viewership and ratings per season of Good Girls
Season	Timeslot (ET)	Episodes	First aired		Last aired		TV season	Viewership rank	Avg. viewers (millions)
Season	Timeslot (ET)	Episodes	Date	Viewers (millions)	Date	Viewers (millions)	TV season	Viewership rank	Avg. viewers (millions)
1	Monday 10:00 pm	10	February 26, 2018	5.98	April 30, 2018	4.04	2017–18	71	6.07
2	Sunday 10:00 pm	13	March 3, 2019	2.75	May 26, 2019	2.26	2018–19	122	3.75
3	Sunday 10:00 pm	11	February 16, 2020	1.97	May 3, 2020	1.75	2019–20	93	3.42
4	Sunday 10:00 p.m. (1–9); Thursday 9:00 p.m. (10, 12–15); Thursday 10:00 p.m (11, 16)	16	March 7, 2021	1.68	July 22, 2021	1.68	2020–21	TBD	TBD

==== Season 1 ====
Viewership and ratings per episode of Good Girls
No.	Title	Air date	Rating/share (18–49)	Viewers (millions)	DVR (18–49)	DVR viewers (millions)	Total (18–49)	Total viewers (millions)
1	"Pilot"	February 26, 2018	1.5/6	5.98	0.6	2.02	2.1	8.00
2	"Mo Money, Mo Problems"	March 5, 2018	1.3/5	5.36	—N/a	—N/a	—N/a	—N/a
3	"Borderline"	March 12, 2018	1.0/4	4.46	0.5	1.56	1.5	6.02
4	"Atom Bomb"	March 19, 2018	1.0/4	4.07	0.5	—N/a	1.5	—N/a
5	"Taking Care of Business"	March 26, 2018	0.9/4	4.28	—N/a	—N/a	—N/a	—N/a
6	"A View From the Top"	April 2, 2018	0.9/3	4.04	0.5	1.69	1.4	5.73
7	"Special Sauce"	April 9, 2018	1.0/4	4.28	0.5	1.55	1.5	5.84
8	"Shutdown"	April 16, 2018	0.9/4	4.24	0.5	—N/a	1.4	—N/a
9	"Summer of the Shark"	April 23, 2018	0.9/4	3.95	0.4	1.46	1.3	5.41
10	"Remix"	April 30, 2018	0.9/4	4.04	—N/a	—N/a	—N/a	—N/a

==== Season 2 ====
Viewership and ratings per episode of Good Girls
No.	Title	Air date	Rating/share (18–49)	Viewers (millions)	DVR (18–49)	DVR viewers (millions)	Total (18–49)	Total viewers (millions)
1	"I'd Rather Be Crafting"	March 3, 2019	0.7/3	2.75	0.6	1.84	1.3	4.59
2	"Slow Down, Children at Play"	March 10, 2019	0.6/3	2.46	0.6	1.83	1.2	4.30
3	"You Have Reached The Voicemail Of Leslie Peterson"	March 17, 2019	0.5/3	2.36	0.5	1.62	1.0	3.98
4	"Pick Your Poison"	March 24, 2019	0.6/3	2.31	0.5	1.66	1.1	3.98
5	"Everything Must Go"	March 31, 2019	0.6/3	2.16	0.5	1.69	1.1	3.86
6	"Take Off Your Pants"	April 7, 2019	0.6/3	2.39	0.6	1.70	1.2	4.09
7	"The Dubby"	April 14, 2019	0.6/3	2.39	0.5	1.66	1.1	4.05
8	"Thelma and Louise"	April 21, 2019	0.5/3	2.14	0.6	1.82	1.1	3.96
9	"One Last Time"	April 28, 2019	0.6/3	2.34	0.6	1.69	1.2	4.04
10	"This Land is Your Land"	May 5, 2019	0.5/2	2.25	0.5	1.58	1.0	3.83
11	"Hunting Season"	May 12, 2019	0.4/2	1.99	0.6	1.63	1.0	3.62
12	"Jeff"	May 19, 2019	0.5/3	2.35	0.6	1.70	1.1	4.06
13	"King"	May 26, 2019	0.5/3	2.26	0.7	1.79	1.2	4.06

==== Season 3 ====
Viewership and ratings per episode of Good Girls
No.	Title	Air date	Rating (18–49)	Viewers (millions)	DVR (18–49)	DVR viewers (millions)	Total (18–49)	Total viewers (millions)
1	"Find Your Beach"	February 16, 2020	0.4	1.97	0.5	1.58	0.9	3.55
2	"Not Just Cards"	February 23, 2020	0.4	1.81	0.6	1.67	1.0	3.47
3	"Egg Roll"	March 1, 2020	0.4	1.80	0.6	1.66	1.0	3.47
4	"The Eye In Survivor"	March 8, 2020	0.5	1.91	0.5	1.50	1.0	3.42
5	"Au Jus"	March 15, 2020	0.4	1.90	0.5	1.51	0.9	3.42
6	"Frere Jacques"	March 22, 2020	0.5	1.90	0.5	1.52	1.0	3.42
7	"Vegas Baby"	March 29, 2020	0.5	1.98	0.5	1.49	1.0	3.47
8	"Nana"	April 5, 2020	0.4	1.84	0.6	1.62	1.0	3.46
9	"Incentive"	April 19, 2020	0.4	1.75	0.6	1.70	1.0	3.46
10	"Opportunity"	April 26, 2020	0.3	1.58	0.5	1.52	0.8	3.10
11	"Synergy"	May 3, 2020	0.4	1.75	0.5	1.65	0.9	3.40

==== Season 4 ====
Viewership and ratings per episode of Good Girls
No.	Title	Air date	Rating (18–49)	Viewers (millions)	DVR (18–49)	DVR viewers (millions)	Total (18–49)	Total viewers (millions)
1	"One Night in Bangkok"	March 7, 2021	0.4	1.68	0.4	1.33	0.8	3.02
2	"Big Kahuna"	March 14, 2021	0.3	1.51	0.4	1.32	0.7	2.84
3	"Fall Guy"	March 21, 2021	0.3	1.53	—N/a	—N/a	—N/a	—N/a
4	"Dave"	March 28, 2021	0.3	1.30	—N/a	—N/a	—N/a	—N/a
5	"The Banker"	April 11, 2021	0.3	1.53	0.4	1.32	0.7	2.84
6	"Grandma Loves Grisham"	April 18, 2021	0.4	1.51	0.4	1.28	0.8	2.79
7	"Carolyn with a Y"	May 2, 2021	0.3	1.39	0.4	1.33	0.7	2.72
8	"Broken Toys"	May 9, 2021	0.3	1.42	0.4	1.21	0.7	2.63
9	"Chef Boyardee"	May 16, 2021	0.4	1.43	0.3	1.09	0.7	2.52
10	"Strong Hearts Strong Sales"	June 24, 2021	0.3	1.57	0.3	0.96	0.6	2.53
11	"Put It all on Two"	June 24, 2021	0.3	1.39	0.3	0.99	0.6	2.37
12	"Family First"	July 1, 2021	0.3	1.43	TBD	TBD	TBD	TBD
13	"You"	July 8, 2021	0.3	1.61	TBD	TBD	TBD	TBD
14	"Thank You for Your Support"	July 15, 2021	0.3	1.69	TBD	TBD	TBD	TBD
15	"We're Even"	July 22, 2021	0.3	1.53	TBD	TBD	TBD	TBD
16	"Nevada"	July 22, 2021	0.3	1.68	TBD	TBD	TBD	TBD

=== Critical response ===
The review aggregator website Rotten Tomatoes reported an approval rating of 63% based on 51 reviews of the first season of the series, with an average rating of 6.3/10. The website's critical consensus reads, "The plot of Good Girls may not be entirely believable, but the strong performances from its lead actresses are." Metacritic assigned a weighted average score of 60 out of 100, based on 23 critics, indicating "mixed or average reviews".

The second season of the series holds a rating of 100% with an average of 6.3/10 from 9 critics. The third season of the series holds a rating of 100% with an average of 8.5/10, from 6 critics. The fourth season has an approval rating of 83% based 6 reviews, with an average ratings of 7.4/10.

=== Accolades ===
Year	Award	Category	Nominee	Result	Ref.
2019	Satellite Awards	Best Actress in a Comedy or Musical Series	Christina Hendricks	Nominated	
2021	The ReFrame Stamp	2020–21 Top 200 Most Popular Television Recipients	Good Girls	Awarded	
