= Overlook Film Festival =

Horror film festival

- Started: 2017
- Directors: Michael Lerman; Landon Zakheim
- Website: overlookfilmfest.com

The Overlook Film Festival is an annual film festival that takes place each spring, showcasing horror films and live performances. The inaugural event took place at the Timberline Lodge in Mount Hood, Oregon in 2017. Since 2018, the festival has been held in New Orleans, Louisiana.

== History ==
The Overlook Film Festival takes place each year in Spring. The festival, which is co-directed by Landon Zakheim and Michael Lerman, originated with the Stanley Film Festival, which was run by Zakheim and Lerman in Colorado for three years. The Stanley Film Festival went on hiatus in 2016, leading to the creation of the Overlook Film Festival.

The 1st annual Overlook Film Festival took place at the Timberline Lodge in Mount Hood, Oregon, which served as the exterior of the Overlook Hotel in the 1980 film The Shining. The 2nd and 3rd annual festivals, which took place in 2018 and 2019 respectively, were held in New Orleans, Louisiana.

The 4th annual Overlook Film Festival was scheduled to be held again in New Orleans in 2020, but the event was postponed indefinitely due to the COVID-19 pandemic. Instead, it was one of the partners in the Nightstream online festival. The 2023 festival was held in New Orleans.

== Festival Lineups ==
=== 2017 ===
The 2017 festival took place from April 27 to 30.

==== Opening Night Film ====
- Stephanie (Akiva Goldsman, US, 2017)

==== Centerpiece Film ====
- Lady Macbeth (William Oldroyd, UK, 2016)

==== Closing Night Film ====
- It Comes at Night (Trey Edward Shults, US, 2017) - Also secret screening

==== World Premieres ====
- Blood Drive (James Roland, US, 2017)
- Still/Born (Brandon Christensen, Canada, 2017)

==== North American Premiere ====
- Prey (Dick Maas, Netherlands, 2016)

==== Other Screenings ====
- The Bad Batch (Ana Lily Amirpour, US, 2016)
- The Bar (Álex de la Iglesia, Spain, 2017)
- Boys in the Trees (Nicholas Verso, Australia, 2016)
- The Dwarves Must Be Crazy (Bhin Banloerit, Thailand, 2016)
- Hounds of Love (Ben Young, US, 2016)
- Killing Ground (Damien Power, Australia, 2016)
- Lake Bodom (Taneli Mustonen, Finland, 2017)
- Like Me (Robert Mockler, US, 2017)
- Mayhem (Joe Lynch, US, 2017)
- Meatball Machine Koduku (Yoshihiro Nishimura, Japan, 2017)
- M.F.A. (Natalia Leite, US, 2017)
- Psychopaths (Mickey Keating, US, 2017)
- Terror 5 (Sebastian Rotstein & Federico Rotstein, Argentina, 2016)
- Two Pigeons (Dominic Bridges, UK, 2017)
- The Untamed (Amat Enscalante, Mexico/Denmark, 2017)

=== 2018 ===
The 2018 festival took place from April 19 to 22.

==== Opening Night Film ====
- Unfriended: Dark Web (Stephen Susco, US, 2018)

==== Centerpiece Film ====
- St. Agatha (Darren Lynn Bousman, US, 2018) - Also world premiere

==== Closing Night Film ====
- Hereditary (Ari Aster, US, 2018)

==== World Premieres ====
- The Farm (Hans Stjernswärd, US, 2018)
- Puppet Master: The Littlest Reich (Sonny Laguna & Tommy Wiklund, US, 2018)
- Sex Madness Revealed (Tim Kirk, US, 2018)

==== Other Screenings ====
- Arizona (Jonathan Watson, US, 2018)
- Beast (Michael Pearce, US, 2017)
- Blood Fest (Owen Egerton, US, 2018)
- Blue My Mind (Lisa Brühlmann, Switzerland, 2017)
- Caniba (Véréna Paravel & Lucien Castaing-Taylor, France, 2017)
- Don't Leave Home (Michael Tully, US, 2018)
- Downrange (Ryuhei Kitamura, US, 2018)
- Ghost Stories (Jeremy Dyson & Andy Nyman, UK, 2017)
- Good Manners (Juliana Rojas & Marco Dutra, Brazil/France, 2017)
- The Ranger (Jenn Wexler, US, 2018)
- Revenge (Coralie Fargeat, France, 2017)
- Satan's Slaves (Joko Anwar, Indonesia, 2017)

=== 2019 ===
The 2019 festival took place from May 30 to June 2.

==== Opening Night Film ====
- The Dead Don't Die (Jim Jarmusch, Sweden/US, 2019) - Also US premiere

==== Centerpiece Film ====
- Come to Daddy (Ant Timpson, US/New Zealand/Canada/Ireland, 2019)

==== Closing Night Film ====
- The Lodge (Severin Fiala & Veronika Franz, US/UK, 2019)

==== World Premieres ====
- Satanic Panic (Chelsea Stardust, US, 2019)
- Z (Brandon Christensen, US, 2019)

==== US Premieres ====
- Gwen (William McGregor, UK, 2018)

==== Other Screenings ====
- Bliss (Joe Begos, US, 2019)
- Dachra (Abdelhamid Bouchnak, Tunisia, 2019)
- Daniel Isn't Real (Adam Egypt Mortimer, US, 2019)
- Depraved (Larry Fessenden, US, 2019)
- Extra Ordinary (Mike Ahern & Enda Loughman, Ireland/Belgium, 2019)
- The Faculty (Robert Rodriguez, US, 1998)
- Girl on the Third Floor (Travis Stevens, US, 2019)
- Greener Grass (Jocelyn DeBoer & Dawn Luebbe, US, 2019)
- Head Count (Elle Callahan, US, 2018)
- Horror Noire: A History of Black Horror (Xavier Burgin, US, 2018)
- In Fabric (Peter Strickland, UK, 2018)
- Knives and Skin (Jennifer Reeder, US, 2019)
- Ma (Tate Taylor, US, 2019)
- Nightmare Cinema (Alejandro Brugués, Ryûhei Kitamura, David Slade, Joe Dante, & Mick Garris, US/Japan/Argentina, 2019)
- One Cut of the Dead (Shinichiro Ueda, Japan, 2017)
- Paradise Hills (Alice Waddington, US/Spain, 2019)
- Porno (Keola Racela, US, 2019)
- Red 11 (Robert Rodriguez, US, 2019)
- Swamp Thing (Len Wiseman, US, 2019)
- The Vast of Night (Andrew Patterson, US, 2019)

=== 2020 ===
The Overlook Film Festival participated in the Nightstream event due to the COVID-19 pandemic. The lineup can be viewed on the Nightstream article.

=== 2021 ===
The Overlook Film Festival participated in the Nightstream event due to the COVID-19 pandemic. The lineup can be viewed on the Nightstream article.

=== 2022 ===
The 2022 festival took place from June 2 to 5.

==== Opening Night Film ====
- Mona Lisa and the Blood Moon (Ana Lily Amirpour, US, 2022) - Also North American premiere

===== Centerpiece Film =====
- Resurrection (Andrew Semans, US, 2022)

===== Closing Night Film =====
- The Black Phone (Scott Derrickson, US, 2022)

===== World Premieres =====
- Shaky Shivers (Sung Kang, US, 2022)
- The Summoned (Mark Meir, US, 2022)
- Swallowed (Carter Smith, US, 2022)
- Who Invited Them (Duncan Birmingham, US, 2022)

===== Other Screenings =====
- The Cow (Eli Horowitz, US, 2022)
- Deadstream (Joseph Winter & Vanessa Winter, US, 2022)
- Flux Gourmet (Peter Strickland, US/UK/Hungary, 2022)
- Good Madam (Jenna Cato Bass, South Africa, 2022)
- Hypochondriac (Addison Heimann, US, 2022)
- Jethica (Pete Ohs, US, 2022)
- Mad God (Phil Tippet, US, 2021)
- Piggy (Carlota Pereda, Spain/France, 2022)
- Roger Corman, The Pope of Pop Cinema (Bertrand Tessier, France, 2021)
- Saloum (Jean Luc Herbulot, Senegal, 2021)
- She Will (Charlotte Colbert, UK, 2021)
- Sissy (Hannah Barlow & Kane Senes, Australia, 2022)
- Watcher (Chloe Okuno, US, 2022)
- Zalava (Arsalan Amiri, Iran, 2021)

==== Repertory Screenings ====
- Bela Lugosi Meets a Brooklyn Gorilla (William Beaudine, US, 1952) - 70th Anniversary screening
- Haxan (Benjamin Christensen, Sweden, 1922) - 100th Anniversary screening
- Sleepwalkers (Mick Garris, US, 1992) - 30th Anniversary Screening

=== 2023 ===
The 2023 festival took place from March 30 to April 2.

==== Opening Night Film ====
- Renfield (Chris McKay, US, 2023) - Also world premiere

===== Centerpiece Film =====
- Talk to Me (Danny Philippou & Michael Philippou, US, 2023) - Also secret screening

===== Closing Night Film =====
- Evil Dead Rise (Lee Cronin, US, 2023)

===== World Premieres =====
- Accused (Philip Barantini, US, 2023)
- Clock (Alexis Jacknow, US, 2023)
- Godless: The Eastfield Exorcism (Nick Kozakis, Australia, 2023)
- Trim Season (Ariel Vida, US, 2023)
- We Kill For Love (Anthony Penta, US, 2023)

===== Other Screenings =====
- Aberrance (Baatar Batsukh, Mongolia, 2022)
- The Angry Black Girl and Her Monster (Bomani J. Story, US, 2023)
- Appendage (Anna Zlokovic, US, 2023)
- The Artifice Girl (Franklin Ritch, US, 2022)
- birth/rebirth (Lee Moss, US, 2023)
- Brooklyn 45 (Ted Geoghegan, US, 2023)
- The Elderly (Raúl Cerezo & Fernando González Gómez, Spain, 2022)
- The Five Devils (Léa Mysius, France, 2022)
- Give Me an A (Natasha Halevi, Meg Swertlow, Bonnie Discepolo, Danin Jacquay, Erica Mary Wright, Monica Moore-Suriyage, Sarah Kopkin, Caitlin Hargraves, Megan Rosati, Hannah Alline, Avital Ash, Mary C. Russell, Valerie Finkel, Kelly Nygaard, Loren Escandón, & Francesca Maldonado, US, 2022)
- It Lives Inside (Bishal Dutta, US, 2023)
- Late Night with the Devil (Colin Cairnes & Cameron Cairnes, Australia, 2023)
- Mister Organ (David Farrier, New Zealand, 2022)
- Monolith (Matt Vesely, Australia, 2022)
- My Animal (Jacqueline Castel, Canada, 2023)
- Smoking Causes Coughing (Quentin Dupieux, France, 2022)
- The Wrath of Becky (Matt Angel & Suzanna Coote, US, 2023)

==== Repertory Screenings ====
- The Dead Zone (David Cronenberg, US, 1983) - 40th Anniversary screening
- The Lodger: A Story of the London Fog (Alfred Hitchcock, UK, 1927)
- Matinee (Joe Dante, US, 1993) - 30th Anniversary screening
- Only Lovers Left Alive (Jim Jarmusch, US/Germany/UK, 2013) - 10th Anniversary screening
- The Tingler (William Castle, US, 1959)

=== 2024 ===
The 2024 festival took place from April 4 to April 7.

==== Opening Night Film ====
- Cuckoo (Tilman Singer, Germany 2024)

===== Closing Night Film =====
- Abigail (Matt Bettinelli-Olpin & Tyler Gillett, US, 2024) - Also world premiere

===== World Premieres =====
- The Beyond (Lucio Fulci, Italy, 1981) - World premiere of 4K Restoration

===== Other Screenings =====
- All You Need is Death (Paul Duane, Ireland, 2024)
- Arcadian (Benjamin Brewer, US, 2024)
- Azrael (E.L. Katz, US, 2024)
- Birdeater (Jack Clark & Jim Weir, US, 2023)
- Blackout (Larry Fessenden, US, 2023)
- Dead Mail (Joe DeBoer & Kyle McConagh, US, 2024)
- Exhuma (Jang Jae-Hyun, South Korea, 2024)
- Hood Witch (Saïd Balktibia, France, 2023)
- Humanist Vampire Seeking Consenting Suicidal Person (Ariane Louis-Seize, Canada, 2023)
- I Don't Understand You (Brian Crano & David Craig, US, 2023)
- I Saw the TV Glow (Jane Schoenbrun, US, 2024)
- In a Violent Nature (Chris Nash, Canada , 2024)
- Infested (Sébastien Vanicek, France, 2023)
- Kill Your Lover (Alix Austin & Keir Siewert, UK, 2023)
- Look Into My Eyes (Lana Wilson, US, 2024)
- New Life (John Rosman, US, 2023)
- Oddity (Damian McCarthy, Ireland, 2024)
- Realm of Satan (Scott Cummings, US, 2024)
- Red Rooms (Pascal Plante, US, 2023)
- Sleep (Jason Yu, US, 2023)
- Things Will Be Different (Michael Felker, US, 2024)

==== Repertory Screenings ====
- Creature From the Black Lagoon (Jack Arnold, US, 1954) - 70th Anniversary
- Hands of Orlac (Robert Wiene, Austria, 1924) - 100th Anniversary
- Oculus (Mike Flanagan, US, 2014) - 10th Anniversary
- Phantom of the Paradise (Brian De Palma, US, 1974) - 50th Anniversary

=== 2025 ===
The 2025 festival took place from April 3 to April 6.

==== Opening Night Film ====
- Drop (Christopher Landon, US, 2025)

===== Centerpiece Film =====
- The Ugly Stepsister (Emilie Blichfeldt, US, 2025)

===== Closing Night Film =====
- Clown in a Cornfield (Eli Craig, US, 2025)

===== World Premieres =====
- Abraham's Boys (Natasha Kermani, US, 2025)

===== Other Screenings =====
- 40 Acres (R.T. Thorne, US, 2025)
- Ash (Flying Lotus, US, 2025)
- Best Wishes to All (Yuta Shimotsu, Japan, 2023)
- Chain Reactions (Alexandre Philippe, US, 2024)
- Cloud (Kiyoshi Kurosawa, Japan, 2024)
- Dead Lover (Grace Glowicki, Canada, 2025)
- Frewaka (Aislinn Clarke, Ireland, 2024)
- Good Boy (Ben Leonberg, US, 2025)
- Hallow Road (Babak Anvari, UK, 2025)
- The Home (Mattias J Skoglund, Sweden/Estonia/Iceland, 2025)
- Ick (Joseph Kahn, US, 2024)
- It Ends (Alexander Ullom, US, 2024)
- Lifehack (Ronan Corrigan, UK, 2025)
- Monster Island (Mike Wiluan, Singapore/Indonesia/Japan/UK, 2024)
- Predators (David Osit, US, 2025)
- Redux Redux (Kevin McManus & Matthew McManus, US, 2024)
- Rosario (Felipe Vargas, Colombia/US, 2025)
- The Shrouds (David Cronenberg, France/Canada, 2024)
- The Spirit of Halloweentown (Brett Whitcomb & Bradford Thomason, US, 2024)
- Touch Me (Addison Heimann, US, 2025)
- The True Beauty of Being Bitten by a Tick (Pete Ohs, US, 2025)
- Zodiac Killer Project (Charlie Shackleton, US/UK, 2023)

==== Repertory Screenings ====
- 13 Ghosts (William Castle, US, 1960) - 65th Anniversary screening
- Death Becomes Her (Robert Zemeckis, US, 1994)
- The Descent (Neil Marshall, UK, 2005) - 20th Anniversary screening
- Lost Highway (David Lynch, US, 1997) - Tribute to David Lynch
- The Phantom of the Opera (Rupert Julian, US, 1925) - 100th Anniversary screening
- Re-Animator (Stuart Gordon, US, 1985) - 40th Anniversary screening
- Tales From the Crypt: Demon Knight (Ernest Dickerson, US, 1995) - 30th Anniversary screening

=== 2026 ===
The 2026 festival took place from April 9 to 12.

==== Opening Night Film ====
- Obsession (Curry Barker, US, 2025)

===== Centerpiece Film =====
- Leviticus (Adrian Chiarella, US, 2026)

===== Closing Night Film =====
- Hokum (Damian McCarthy, US, 2026)

===== World Premieres =====
- Goody Goody (Raymond Creamer, US, 2026)
- Trauma or, Monsters All (Larry Fessenden, US, 2026)

===== Other Screenings =====
- Affection (BT Meza, US, 2025)
- American Dollhouse (John Valley, US, 2026)
- Boorman and the Devil (David Kittridge, US, 2025)
- Buddy (Casper Kelly, US, 2026)
- Buffet Infinity (Simon Glassman, Canada, 2025)
- Chili Finger (Edd Benda & Stephen Helstad, US, 2026)
- Cramps! A Period Piece (Brooke H. Cellars, US, 2025)
- Drag (Raviv Ullman & Greg Yagolnitzer, US, 2026)
- Exit 8 (Genki Kawamura, Japan, 2025)
- Faces of Death (Daniel Goldhaber, US, 2026)
- Family Movie (Kevin Bacon, US, 2026)
- Flush (Gregory Morin, France, 2025)
- The Furious (Kenji Tanigaki, US, 2025)
- Grind (Brea Grant, Ed Dougherty, & Chelsea Stardust, US, 2025)
- The Holy Boy (Paolo Strippoli, Italy, 2025)
- Marama (Taratoa Stappard, New Zealand, 2025)
- Never After Dark (Dave Boyle, Japan, 2026)
- New Group (Yuta Shimotsu, US, 2025)
- Normal (Ben Wheatley, US, 2025)
- Over Your Dead Body (Jorma Taccone, US, 2026)
- Parasomnia (James Ross II, US, 2025)
- The Restoration at Grayson Manor (Glenn McQuaid, Ireland, 2025)
- Saccharine (Natalie Erika James, Australia, 2026)
- Suffocation (Louis Chan & Stone Chang, Taiwan, 2026)
- Ugly Cry (Emily Robinson, US, 2026)

==== Repertory Screenings ====
- An American Werewolf in London (John Landis, US, 1981) - 45th Anniversary screening
- Blackout (Larry Fessenden, US, 2023)
- Demon Lover Diary (Joel DeMott, US, 1980)
- Depraved (Larry Fessenden, US, 2019)
- Habit (Larry Fessenden, US, 1995)
- A Page of Madness (Teinosuke Kinugasa, Japan, 1926) - 100th Anniversary screening

== See also ==
- List of fantastic and horror film festivals
