= Blackout (2023 film) =

2023 American horror film

- Directed by: Larry Fessenden
- Written by: Larry Fessenden
- Produced by: Larry Fessenden; J. Christian Ingvordsen; James Felix McKenney
- Starring: Alex Hurt; Addison Timlin; Motell Gyn Foster
- Cinematography: Collin Brazie
- Music by: Will Bates
- Production company: Glass Eye Pix
- Release date: July 20, 2023 (Fantasia Film Festival)
- Running time: 104 minutes
- Country: United States
- Language: English

Blackout is a 2023 American horror film written and directed by Larry Fessenden and starring Alex Hurt, Addison Timlin and Motell Gyn Foster. As with Fessenden's previous film Depraved, it is inspired by classic monster movies (in the case of Blackout, werewolf films such as The Wolf Man) though it is not a direct remake. Fessenden has named Marvel Comics's Werewolf by Night series as an inspiration for the film, in addition to the Universal Classic Monster films of the 30s, 40's and 50's.

== Plot ==
Charley Barrett, an artist in a small upstate New York town, has become a werewolf. Struggling with alcoholism and depression and realizing that he'll keep killing every full moon unless he is stopped, he sets off to try and find some closure among the various residents of town (including his ex, a local pastor, and people on both sides of a simmering local anti-immigrant movement). After an assisted suicide attempt with a silver bullet fails, he transforms into a werewolf and goes on a rampage, eventually stopped by his sympathetic ex-girlfriend, who realizes what he's become and puts him out of his misery.

== Cast ==
- Alex Hurt as Charley Barrett
- Addison Timlin as Sharon Hammond
- Motell Gyn Foster as Earl
- Joseph Castillo-Midyett as Luis Sanchez
- Ella Rae Peck as Alice
- Rigo Garay as Miguel Lopez
- John Speredakos as Pastor Francis
- Michael Buscemi as Andy
- Jeremy Holm as Harry
- Barbara Crampton as Kate
- Cody Kostro as Burt
- Marc Senter as Ernie
- Kevin Corrigan as Bob Kraus
- Joe Swanberg as Stuart
- Asta Paredes as Asta Carter
- Clay von Carlowitz as Clay Carter
- James Le Gros as Tom Granick
- Marshall Bell as Jack Hammond

In addition, there is a small cameo in a post-credit scene from Alex Breaux reprising his role of Frankenstein's monster from Fessenden's film Depraved. According to Fessenden "This is the beginning of my monsterverse, and... I do intend to make a mashup. It's the final comment on these movies I love" (referring to the Universal "Monster Rally" films such as Frankenstein Meets the Wolf Man.)

== Production ==
The script for Blackout was adapted from an episode Fessenden wrote and produced for his horror podcast inspired by 1930s radio dramas, Tales From Beyond the Pale. Fessenden claims the idea originated with a pitch (ultimately unproduced) that he made for a segment in one of the V/H/S films. Fessenden met actor Alex Hurt through his son, Jack Fessenden, who had directed Hurt in the 2021 film Foxhole. Fessenden explained: "When I met Alex (while I was producing Jack's film), Alex revealed that he loved old monster movies, that they were why he decided to become an actor in the first place. He then revealed that he had had a volatile relationship with his dad [actor William Hurt], and it just triggered something in my mind. That's something very much a part of the original Wolf Man story, the [contentious] father-son relationship... Each of these dynamics are heartbreaking and, I thought, worth mining further." The elder Hurt appears in real family photographs with his son in the movie.

On the subject of werewolf films, Fessenden has said "I think about the personality of the monster. What is its mythology? What about the characteristics of the monster? And that suggests the themes... With Blackout, I was thinking about a werewolf. What is that? A divided personality. Then I'm like well our whole nation is divided right now, so you can see how one comes from the other." The fictional town "Talbot Falls", where most of the movie takes place, is named after Lon Chaney Jr.'s character Larry Talbot from The Wolf Man and its sequels. Hurt watched "every Lon Chaney [Jr.] movie multiple times" and ran "seven to 10 miles a day" to lose weight in preparation for the role.

Filming was significantly funded by the tax incentives from Fessenden's previous film Depraved, which took several years to arrive. The film was shot near Woodstock, New York, "within two miles" of Fessenden's home, allowing him to make "handshake deals" with locals for use of their locations, which allowed the film to be shot much cheaper.

The paintings depicted in the movie were created by Brooklyn-based artist John Mitchell. Mitchell had invited Fessenden to sit for a portrait, and while painting it the two had discussed their mutual interest in werewolf iconography, after which Fessenden decided to make the protagonist of BLACKOUT an artist.

== Release ==
Blackout had a world premiere at the 27th Fantasia International Film Festival in August 2023, and at the Brooklyn Horror Film Festival in October. It was released on Video on demand April 12, 2024.

== Reception ==
Reviews of the film were generally positive. Simon Abrams of RogerEbert.com gave it a mixed review, calling Blackout "a werewolf psychodrama, [which] showcases [Fessenden's] usual attention to performance and character-driven details," but concluded it "has a lot to recommend it, but not enough to fully satisfy." Robert Abele of the LA times called the film "appealingly scrappy and thoughtful" noting that "Blackout continues an ongoing project [by Fessenden] to put a modern spin on the legendary figures of horror cinema... Not everything about the DIY aura of “Blackout” is effective and the pace can slow to a heavy lope as Fessenden's screenplay takes on too much meat... Yet the idiosyncratic earnestness of an experienced horrormeister playing with the classics still makes for a substantial midnight snack." In a glowing essay on the film, Angel Melanson of Fangoria called it "a singular, handmade work from one of our great American storytellers," and explained that, "every aspect of Blackout — its pacing, its beautiful character work, its very specific structure — seems to gleefully abandon expectation and convention, and trusts that audiences will take this funny/sad/human trip crafted by a wholly original cinematic voice." Writing for Bloody Disgusting, Meagan Navarro concludes that "Fessenden offers a veritable, funny, sometimes sluggish yet poignant slice of life with a violent and bloody horror twist."

In a more mixed review for Medium, Eric Langberg wrote that the movie is "an odd one. For a horror movie, it's pretty slow; the actual werewolf scenes are few and far between, especially at first. Much of the movie is spent on discussions of local environmental land-use studies and how they relate to an ongoing construction project. However, when they do pop up, the werewolf sequences are fantastic, a lower-budget delight that manages to be both campy and eerily beautiful. In short, there's plenty here to recommend, even if the movie is somewhat uneven." In a negative review for Collider Maggie Boccella writes that as director, Fessenden is "...juggling too many balls, and to be entirely honest, [the] final project doesn't feel too far off from a student film" and that the film "rides a strange line between a gorefest and a more introspective kind of horror, never fully committing to one or the other. It leaves you searching for any amount of meaning in the text, if only to justify the hundred minutes you spent watching it.
