= Glass Eye Pix =

- Industry: Entertainment
- Founded: November 2, 1985; 40 years ago
- Founders: Larry Fessenden
- Headquarters: New York City, New York, United States
- Products: Motion pictures
- Website: glasseyepix.com

Glass Eye Pix is an American independent film studio based in New York City, New York known primarily for producing horror films.

== History ==
Film director Larry Fessenden founded Glass Eye Pix on November 2, 1985 in order to copyright his own films, including Habit, Wendigo and The Last Winter. The name came from a glass eye one of his friends gave to him as a gift, combined with the old lingo from the trade magazine Variety which called movies "pix". The company eventually grew to encompass others' works as Fessenden began to mentor younger filmmakers.

Glass Eye Pix's low-budget horror banner, Scareflix, was designed to create lean budgeted, auteur-driven films from new directors. Scareflix productions include Glenn McQuaid’s I Sell the Dead, Ti West's The Roost and Trigger Man, James Felix McKenney's Automatons and The Off Season, and I Can See You and The Viewer by Graham Reznick. Other Scareflix include Joe Maggio's Bitter Feast, Jim Mickle's Stake Land, James Felix McKenny's Hypothermia. and Mickey Keating's Darling.

In 2009 Glass Eye Pix partnered with Dark Sky Films, and collaborators Peter Phok and Brent Kunkle, Fessenden produced Ti West's The House of the Devil and The Innkeepers as well as Late Phases.

Recent Glass Eye Pix productions include Stray Bullets by Jack Fessenden, Like Me by Robert Mockler, Birth of The Living Dead by Rob Kuhns, Most Beautiful Island by Ana Asensio, The Ranger by Jenn Wexler, Depraved by Larry Fessenden, Blackout by Larry Fessenden and Crumb Catcher by Chris Skotchdopole.

Outside of the horror genre, the company has produced films including Rick Alverson's The Comedy, Kelly Reichardt's Wendy and Lucy, Ilya Chaiken’s Liberty Kid and Foxhole by Jack Fessenden.

Glass Eye Pix has also produced over 50 episodes of the audio drama series, Tales From Beyond the Pale, created by Fessenden and Glenn McQuaid, and hosted by Fessenden.

== Films produced ==
- The Eliminator (1979)
- The Field (1980)
- White Trash (1980)
- Lifeline (1981)
- A Face in the Crowd (1981)
- Habit (1982)
- Experienced Movers (1985)
- Chinatown (1986)
- Mismatch (1987)
- Hollow Venus (1989)
- Stunt: A Musical Motion Picture (1989)
- No Telling (1991)
- Habit (1997)
- The Gods of Times Square (1999) – by Richard Sandler
- Wendigo (2001)
- The Making of 'No Telling' (2001)
- Searching for the Wendigo (2002)
- Zombie Honeymoon (2004)
- The Off Season (2004)
- Automatons (2005)
- The Roost (2005)
- Escape Artists (2005)
- The Last Winter (2006)
- Trigger Man (2006)
- Blood Red Earth (2007)
- I Can See You (2008)
- Wendy and Lucy (2008)
- I Sell The Dead (2008)
- The House of the Devil (2009)
- Bitter Feast (2010)
- Stake Land (2010)
- Hypothermia (2011)
- The Innkeepers (2011)
- Tales From Beyond the Pale (2012)
- The Comedy (2012)
- Birth of the Living Dead (2012)
- Beneath (2013)
- Darling (2015)
- Late Phases (2015)
- The Stakelander (2016)
- Certain Women (2016)
- Stray Bullets (2016)
- Psychopaths (2017)
- Like Me (2017)
- Most Beautiful Island (2017)
- The Ranger (2018)
- Depraved (2019)
- Foxhole (2021)
- Blackout (2024)
- Crumb Catcher (2024)
