= Foxhole (film) =

2021 American film by Jack Fessenden

- Theatrical release poster
- Directed by: Jack Fessenden
- Written by: Jack Fessenden
- Produced by: James Felix McKenney; Chris Ingvordsen; Adam Scherr; Larry Fessenden
- Starring: Motell Gyn Foster; Alex Hurt; Cody Kostro; Angus O'Brien; Alex Breaux; Andi Matichak; James LeGros
- Cinematography: Collin Brazie
- Edited by: Jack Fessenden
- Music by: Jack Fessenden
- Production companies: Glass Eye Pix; Nous Entertainment
- Distributed by: Samuel Goldwyn Films
- Release dates: September 17, 2021 (Oldenburg); May 13, 2022 (United States)
- Running time: 95 minutes
- Country: United States
- Language: English

Foxhole is a 2021 American war drama film written and directed by Jack Fessenden and starring James LeGros and Andi Matichak.

== Plot ==
The story consists of scenes from three different wars involving the same US soldiers facing moral dilemma.

Morton (Alex Hurt) and his Union detachment defend a foxhole in a fog-shrouded American Civil War battlefield, when a bleeding Jackson (Motell Gyn Foster) of the 3rd Mississippi Infantry stumbles toward them. The white soldiers debate how to help their black comrade, who needs a surgeon but probably won't get treatment at the field hospital. Jackson warns them about an impending attack by three Confederate regiments, which could get them court martialed for abandoning their post if they take him in on a stretcher.

In darkness, a German soldier runs into a horse on a World War I battlefield. Corporal Morton’s detachment tries to lay barbed-wire obstacles to close a breach but constantly comes under fire. They find the German in their foxhole and take him prisoner, then debate whether to bring him in for questioning or execute him so they can complete their mission before first light. The German scout warns of an impending attack on the gap in the wire. A panicked Morton tries to shoot him, but the others stop the execution. The noise gives away their position, and a bullet kills Morton. The German takes the chance to escape.

In the last scene, a US Marine detachment rides through the desert in an armored Humvee equipped with a .50 caliber machine gun. When a malfunctioning CD-player distracts the driver Gale (Andi Matichak), the Humvee hits an improvised explosive device. The explosion disables the truck and severely injures Wilson (James Le Gros) 50 km from the base. In a subsequent attack, they kill an enemy carrying a rocket-propelled grenade launcher. Exposed in the flat desert, Gale volunteers to join Sergeant Jackson in retrieving the launcher before its grenade can kill them all. A sniper shoots the rocket. The shrapnel injures Gale, but she and Sarge make it back to the Humvee. He orders everyone to stay put and wait for rescue, but changes his mind by nightfall. After some preparations, they make a run for it at first light.

== Cast ==
- Motell Gyn Foster as Jackson
- Cody Kostro as Clark
- Angus O'Brien as Conrad
- Alex Hurt as Morton
- Alex Breaux as the German
- Asa Spurlock as Confederate Soldier
- James LeGros as Wilson
- Andi Matichak as Gale

== Production ==
Principal photography lasted sixteen days. Filming wrapped in New York in August 2019.

== Release ==
In November 2021, it was announced that Samuel Goldwyn Films acquired North American distribution rights to the film, which premiered at the 2021 Oldenburg International Film Festival.

== Reception ==
The film has a 67% rating on Rotten Tomatoes based on twelve reviews.

John DeFore of The Hollywood Reporter gave the film a positive review, calling it "a movie that almost entirely rises to the height of its ambitions."

Marya E. Gates of RogerEbert.com awarded the film three stars.
