= Community (Fear Itself) =

- Fear Itself episode
- Public punishment
- Episode no.: Season 1 Episode 7
- Directed by: Mary Harron
- Written by: Kelly Kennemer
- Original air date: July 24, 2008

Episode chronology
← Previous "New Year's Day"	Next → "Skin and Bones"

"Community" is the seventh episode of the television series Fear Itself, the episode originally aired on July 24, 2008. The plot revolves around a young couple move into a secure gated community and discover its horrifying secret.

== Synopsis ==
Bobby (Brandon Routh) and Tracy (Shiri Appleby) are a young couple who have decided to move from a big city to The Commons, a suburban gated community. They are enthusiastic about the move, as Tracy desperately wants children; however, their friends Meryl and Scott are mixed about the community. Meryl likes idea of Commons while Scott is highly apprehensive. When signing the contract for their new house, Bobby and Tracy neglect to read the fine print, which contains some fairly specific rules and the repercussions for breaking them.

While things initially seem idyllic, the couple soon uncovers the community's sinister side. Indiscretions are punished harshly, as an adulterous woman is publicly shamed and forced to wear a pig mask, while Phil (John Billingsley), a man complaining about the Commons, is carried off by other men. Bobby and Tracy discover that there are cameras in every home that broadcast footage that everyone within the community can view at their discretion, giving them no privacy. The couple is approached by the Commons HOA president, who asks them when they will have their first child (the fine print on the contract specifies that they must have a child within six months of moving in or their home will be foreclosed). Tracy manages to conceive, saving them from losing the house.

Ultimately Bobby decides that they must leave the community. He hatches a plan with Scott to have Meryl pretend to be Tracy for the cameras, while Tracy sneaks out of town to stay with Scott. The plot is discovered. Sympathetic neighbor Phil kills the HOA president, forcing Bobby to he flee on foot. He's chased by members of the community, when he hears Scott and Tracy, who have arrived with a car. He goes to them, assuming he will be rescued, but they have somehow become brainwashed members of the cult. Bobby is caught by the community.

Five years later, Tracy is now the president of the HOA and is welcoming new people into the community. Bobby watches vacantly from within their home, wheelchair-bound, his legs having been amputated.

== Filming locations ==
The episode was filmed in Edmonton, Alberta, Canada.

== Reception ==
The A.V. Club reviewed "Community" as B+, calling it "another strong episode for me, the best since Stuart Gordon's grisly Week Five entry "Eater."" Reviewers for JoBlo's Arrow in the Head were mixed, as some enjoyed it while others panned it as lacking tension. Dread Central and Slant both panned the episode. Slant noted that the episode's twist was similar to that of Thomas Tryon's Harvest Home, noting that the episode lacked "the power of that novel's symbolic castration."
