= In Sickness and in Health (Fear Itself) =

- Fear Itself episode
- Samantha talks with her bridesmaids
- Episode no.: Season 1 Episode 4
- Directed by: John Landis
- Written by: Victor Salva
- Original air date: June 26, 2008

Guest appearances
- Maggie Lawson; James Roday; William B. Davis; Marshall Bell; Sonja Bennett; Christie Laing; Brendan Hunter; Tommy Lim

Episode chronology
← Previous "Family Man"	Next → "Eater"

"In Sickness and in Health" is the fourth episode of the NBC horror anthology Fear Itself. The episode guest-starred Psych co-stars Maggie Lawson and James Roday.

== Plot ==
Samantha (Maggie Lawson) is about to be married to Carlos (James Roday), a man she deeply loves despite having known him for only a brief period. She suspects that many people, including her lifelong friends and bridesmaids Kelly and Ruthie, believe she is rushing into the marriage. Samantha's brother, Steven, has not yet arrived; Samantha explains that he is upset because she is his only family. Ruthie gives Samantha a note that Father Chris (William B. Davis), the reverend, had given to her. She is told that it was given to him by a woman wearing a red headscarf. Upon opening the letter, she finds a typewritten note that reads: "The person you are marrying is a serial killer."

She meets Carlos and finds that she can't relax around him. Samantha and Carlos get married, despite some hesitation during the ceremony. Preparing for the reception, Samantha tries to assure her friends that nothing has changed, even though they both notice something is wrong. Stressed, she asks them to leave. Alone, she hears a knock on the door. She goes out and glimpses a person leaving, wearing a red headscarf. She meets with Father Chris and asks him who gave him the note. He alludes to a tragedy in Carlos' past that she has not been aware of. She talks with Bob (Marshall Bell), Carlos' uncle, who explains that Carlos' parents mysteriously disappeared when he was sixteen, which traumatized him.

Samantha leaves a voicemail for Steven; confrontations ensue between Carlos, the bridesmaids, and Samantha. Carlos questions her about the note. When she asks if there is anything he wants to tell her, he responds by laughing, tells her not to be scared and starts to advance on her. Samantha retreats into a confessional booth and Carlos tries to coax her out. Without warning, he enters the other half of the booth. Samantha tries to escape but finds that it is blocked. Carlos tells her about a woman who started stalking him and might have been crazy enough to want to ruin their wedding.

Elsewhere, the person in the red scarf enters a room filled with human heads in jars and bloody corpses. After depositing a dead cat on a table, then checking the voicemail, left by Samantha, the person is revealed to be Samantha's brother Steven, dressed as a woman. Carlos asks if they can just forget about the note but Samantha reveals that Father Chris accidentally told Ruthie to give the note to the wrong person; the note was not intended for her, but for him. Carlos says he doesn't want to know what it says so as long as they're together, and that "You'll show me when you're ready, promise?" to which Samantha looks at him strangely and eerily replies "I promise."

== Reception ==
Multiple reviews of the episode noted that it ended with more questions than answers, such as The AV Club questioning "Why does she look so frightened if she's the one who's in control?". Slant felt that the episode's initial conceit of a woman receiving a note stating that she was marrying a serial killer could have been "a pretty good hook for a Hitchcockian melodrama along the lines of Suspicion were Salva actually interested in telling that particular story" but that "it quickly becomes obvious that the whole thing is just a setup for a lame and illogical twist ending."

Dread Central was critical in their review, as they felt that "this series continues to demonstrate the biggest fault of Masters of Horror: Horror anthologies are best suited to half-hour episodes a la Tales From The Crypt instead of the bloated hour-long format."
