= New Year's Day (Fear Itself) =

- Fear Itself episode
- Helen kissing a wounded Eddie
- Episode no.: Season 1 Episode 6
- Directed by: Darren Lynn Bousman
- Written by: Steve Niles; Ben Sokolowski
- Original air date: July 17, 2008

Guest appearances
- Briana Evigan; Zulay Henao; Niall Matter; Cory Monteith; J. LaRose; Campbell Lane

Episode chronology
← Previous "Eater"	Next → "Community"

"New Year's Day" is the sixth episode of the NBC horror anthology Fear Itself. This episode is based on the short story The Dead Time by Paul Kane.

== Plot ==
Briana Evigan plays Helen, a young woman who wakes up with a hangover on New Year's Day. Alarms are going off all over the city. It is revealed that a cataclysmic event at a local chemical plant has turned a large part of the population into zombies. Gradually as she wanders the city, Helen's memory of the previous night returns. Hoping to distract her from the recent death of her brother, roommate Eddie Jones (Niall Matter) took her out to a New Year's Eve party which James (Cory Monteith), a man to whom Helen is attracted, will be attending. At the party, Helen finds Chrissie (Zulay Henao), whom she has lost contact with since the death of her brother. Helen tells her that she's her best friend and the only person at the party who truly cares for the way she is.

Later, she remembers talking to James and telling him that she really loves him, based on mistaken information that she received from Eddie. It turns out that Eddie, not James, is in love with Helen, and she searches out James, whom she finds making out with Chrissie. Helen has survived the night and finally made it to James' apartment. She breaks down the door to find Chrissie screaming. James then shoots Helen in the back.

It is revealed that, in despair, Helen committed suicide after the New Year's Eve party. She has been a zombie the entire night and all of her attempts to communicate with people have been thwarted because she isn't actually speaking English anymore, just zombie-like grunts and groans. In love, Eddie, also a zombie, has been following her the entire night. After he kills James, they hold hands and turn toward Chrissie and eat her.

== Reception ==
Critical reception for "New Year's Day" was mixed. Den of Geek and IGN panned the episode, with IGN criticizing the episode for trying to portray Evigan as unattractive. The A.V. Club and Dread Central were more favorable. Both felt that the episode was fine but not exceptional. Bloody Disgusting rated the episode favorably, giving it 7/10 and writing that "with the exception of the uneven pacing and an impossible to justify appearance by one of the zombies in the final moments of the film, NEW YEAR’S DAY offers a respectable ending with a nice twist, a solid performance from its lead actress, and an interesting new idea to consider adding to the lexicon of zombie lore."
