= Bitter Feast =

- Teaser poster
- Directed by: Joe Maggio
- Written by: Joe Maggio
- Produced by: Derek Curl; Larry Fessenden; Brent Kunkle; Peter Phok
- Starring: James LeGros; Joshua Leonard; Amy Seimetz; Larry Fessenden; Megan Hilty; John Speredakos; Mario Batali
- Cinematography: Michael McDonough
- Edited by: Seth Anderson
- Music by: Jeff Grace
- Production companies: Dark Sky Films; Glass Eye Pix
- Distributed by: Dark Sky Films
- Release date: June 18, 2010
- Country: United States
- Language: English

Bitter Feast is a 2010 American psychological horror film directed and written by Joe Maggio. It stars James LeGros as a chef pushed over the edge by food critic J.T. Franks' (Joshua Leonard) vicious review. The film also features actors Larry Fessenden, Megan Hilty, and a cameo from real life master chef Mario Batali.

== Premise ==
Peter Grey is a successful New York chef, disgruntled by caustic reviews from the food critic J.T. Franks. After Franks' bad review, Grey is fired by his boss Gordon. He kidnaps Franks, takes him to a cabin in the woods, and forces him to cook his own "perfect dinner".

== Cast ==
- James LeGros as Peter Gray
  - Tobias Campbell as Young Peter Gray
- Joshua Leonard as J.T. Franks
- Larry Fessenden as William Coley
- Megan Hilty as Peg
- Mario Batali as Gordon
- Owen Campbell as Johnny
- Paula El Sherif as Cooking Show Guest
- Sean Reid as Co-Worker
- Graham Reznick as Local Newscaster
- Amy Seimetz as Katherine Franks
- John Speredakos as Phil

== Production ==
Bitter Feast was directed by Joe Maggio, and it stars James LeGros and Joshua Leonard. The film was shot in New York City and Woodstock. Larry Fessenden produced the film with his company Glass Eye Pix.

== Release ==
The film premiered as part of the Los Angeles Film Festival on June 18, 2010. The DVD was released in October 26, 2010.

== Reception ==
Rotten Tomatoes, a review aggregator, reports that 57% of seven surveyed critics gave the film a positive review; the average rating is 5.2/10. Paul Brunick of The New York Times wrote, "Beyond its creepy back story, the horror in this morally confused and cinematically inert film is entirely nominal." Mark Olsen of The Village Voice wrote, "Zesty fun for its actors, Feast is at once a sly parody of the celebrity-chef culture spawned by all the cable cooking shows and competitions, and a creepy little chamber-piece."
