= Fear Itself (TV series) =

American horror anthology television series

- Fear Itself intertitle
- Genre: Horror; Suspense
- Created by: Mick Garris
- Theme music composer: Serj Tankian
- Opening theme: "Lie Lie Lie" by Serj Tankian
- Country of origin: United States
- Original language: English
- No. of seasons: 1
- No. of episodes: 13

Production
- Executive producer: Andrew Deane
- Producers: Adam Goldworm; Grant Rosenberg; Ben Browning
- Production locations: Edmonton, Alberta, Canada
- Running time: 42 mins
- Production companies: Fear Itself Productions; Industry Entertainment; Lionsgate Television

Original release
- Network: NBC
- Release: June 5 – July 31, 2008

Fear Itself is an American horror-suspense anthology television series. It debuted on NBC on June 5, 2008, but was pulled from the air after late July 2008 with five episodes remaining unaired. On March 13, 2009, it was confirmed that the series had been canceled and would not return to NBC.

== Production and development ==
Its title is derived from the famous Franklin D. Roosevelt quote, "The only thing we have to fear is fear itself." The anthology was born out of Masters of Horror and shares several of the same creative elements. It features self-contained horror/thriller stories directed by the biggest horror directors working in features, both shows were created by Mick Garris, and both shows are produced by Industry Entertainment's Andrew Deane, Adam Goldworm, and Ben Browning. Stuart Gordon, Brad Anderson, John Landis, Ernest Dickerson, and Rob Schmidt all directed at least one episode of each series.

The series was filmed in the city of Edmonton, Alberta, Canada, with some additional filming taking place in the city of St. Albert and the town of Devon, Alberta. Guest stars included Eric Roberts, Anna Kendrick, Brandon Routh, Josie Davis, Briana Evigan, Jesse Plemons, Elisabeth Moss, and Cory Monteith. The song in the opening credits is titled "Lie Lie Lie" by System of a Down frontman Serj Tankian from his first solo album Elect the Dead.

== Broadcast ==
The show aired on Thursday nights at 10/9c. It was put on hiatus for the duration of the 2008 Summer Olympics, with the promise of a return once the event was over, but no further episodes were aired. While NBC failed to comment on the fate of the series once the Olympics ended, its time-slot was thereafter filled with re-runs of other NBC shows, and Fear Itself did not appear on the NBC Fall 2008 schedule.

In the UK, the show started airing on 5* from Friday 4 May 2012. In Australia, the show commenced screening in August 2012 on the FX channel, available on the Foxtel platform. As of October 15, 2026, episodes can be found on Amazon Prime.

== Home media ==
The complete series was released on DVD on September 15, 2009.

== Episodes ==
The episodes are run in a different order on the DVD and within online streaming sites.

No.	Title	Directed by	Written by	Original release date	U.S. viewers (millions)
1	"The Sacrifice"	Breck Eisner	Mick Garris & Del Howison	June 5, 2008	5.29
Four criminals take refuge inside an isolated, snow-covered fort, and encounter three sisters with a hidden secret who are harbouring a monster. Starring Jeffrey Pierce, Jesse Plemons, and Rachel Miner
2	"Spooked"	Brad Anderson	Mick Garris & Matt Venne	June 12, 2008	4.89
During a stakeout, a private investigator (Eric Roberts) comes face-to-face with the demons of his past.
3	"Family Man"	Ronny Yu	Daniel Knauf	June 19, 2008	4.66
After a car accident, a loving father (Colin Ferguson) and an infamous serial killer (Clifton Collins Jr.) swap bodies.
4	"In Sickness and in Health"	John Landis	Victor Salva	June 26, 2008	4.47
A bride (Maggie Lawson) receives an ominous note that claims her groom (James Roday) is actually a serial killer. Marshall Bell and William B. Davis also star.
5	"Eater"	Stuart Gordon	Richard Chizmar & Johnathon Schaech	July 3, 2008	4.74
A rookie cop (Elisabeth Moss) is assigned to guard a cannibalistic serial killer nicknamed "Eater" (Stephen R. Hart) along with two other officers, but it becomes clear "Eater" is more than a mere serial killer. Also starring Russell Hornsby, Stephen Lee, and Pablo Schreiber.
6	"New Year's Day"	Darren Lynn Bousman	Steve Niles & Ben Sokolowski	July 17, 2008	2.93
A young woman (Briana Evigan) awakens in a post-apocalyptic world overrun by zombies.
7	"Community"	Mary Harron	Kelly Kennemer	July 24, 2008	3.21
A young couple move into a gated community, and discover that the community hides a dark secret. Starring Brandon Routh, Shiri Appleby, and John Billingsley.
8	"Skin & Bones"	Larry Fessenden	Drew McWeeny & Rebecca Swan	July 31, 2008	3.87
A missing rancher (Doug Jones) returns to his family, but they realize that he is no longer the man they knew. Also starring John Pyper-Ferguson, Molly Hagan, and Gordon Tootosin.
9	"Something with Bite"	Ernest Dickerson	Max Landis	Unaired	N/A
After being bitten by a werewolf brought into his clinic, a veterinarian (Wendell Pierce) begins to transform into a werewolf himself. To make matters worse, another werewolf is on a killing spree, and the veterinarian is the top suspect.
10	"Chance"	John Dahl	Story by : Lem Dobbs; Teleplay by : Lem Dobbs & Rick Dahl	Unaired	N/A
Chance Miller (Ethan Embry) is a down-on-his-luck guy whose luck goes even worse when he finds himself dealing with his evil doppelganger
11	"The Spirit Box"	Rob Schmidt	Joe Gangemi	Unaired	N/A
Emily D'Angelo is a dead schoolgirl who speaks to her classmates from beyond the grave. She reveals that she was murdered and she wants her friends' help to seek revenge.
12	"Echoes"	Rupert Wainwright	Sean Hood	Unaired	N/A
A friendly man (Aaron Stanford) discovers that he was a sadistic murderer in a previous life.
13	"The Circle"	Eduardo Rodríguez	Richard Chizmar & Johnathon Schaech	Unaired	N/A
A writer (Johnathon Schaech) stays at a small town to break his writer’s block, but his story begins to happen to him and his wife in reality.
