= Hidden Agenda (2017 video game) =

2017 video game

- Australian cover art
- Developer: Supermassive Games
- Publisher: Sony Interactive Entertainment
- Director: Will Doyle
- Producer: Jez Harris
- Writers: Larry Fessenden; Graham Reznick
- Engine: Unreal Engine 4
- Platform: PlayStation 4
- Release: NA: 24 October 2017; EU: 22 November 2017
- Genre: Action-adventure
- Modes: Single-player, multiplayer

Hidden Agenda is a 2017 action-adventure game developed by Supermassive Games and published by Sony Interactive Entertainment for the PlayStation 4.

== Gameplay ==
Hidden Agenda is a psychological action-adventure game played from a third-person perspective. The player takes control of homicide detective Becky Marney (Katie Cassidy) and district attorney Felicity Graves (Christy Choi/Ashley Voom), (Note: Choi voiced the character while Voom was the model.) both of whom are involved in the case of a serial killer known as The Trapper. The game features quick time events that determine the outcome of the story, including a character's death or survival. With the PlayLink feature, others may join the game to vote for a specific decision to be made, using their Android or iOS smartphones. In competitive mode, one player will at some point receive a secret objective, or Hidden Agenda, which is intended to create conflict between the players as they try to prevent it from happening.

== Plot ==
=== Part 1 ===
The game opens on an event that occurs six weeks before the playable prologue; Father Rominski is seen sitting in a prayer position with a bomb attached to him. When police officers enter the room, another bomb detonates, killing everyone.

In November 2012, Third Precinct detective Becky Marney and her partner Tom Nelson (Leonard Roberts/Michael Addo) (Note: Roberts voiced the character while Addo was the model.) arrive at the scene of a possible hostage situation by a serial killer known as the Trapper. Depending on player choice, Tom and/or the hostage Daniella Cardenas (Catherine Toribio/Eleni Miariti) (Note: Toribio voiced the character while Miariti was the model.) can be killed. Either way, suspected perpetrator Jonathan Finn (Yan Feldman/Jonathan Burteaux) (Note: Feldman voiced the character while Burteaux was the model.) is captured and arrested. Finn confesses to the Trapper crimes and is sentenced to death by lethal injection by Judge William Vanstone (Robert Lewis Merrill/Simon Bond) (Note: Merrill voiced the character while Bond was the model.), despite the recommendation of district attorney Felicity Graves. If Tom died or was promoted to sergeant, Becky is assigned a new partner, Karl Carter (West Liang/Jozef Aoki). (Note: Liang voiced the character while Aoki was the model.)

In 2017, Sergeant Noah Riggs (Chris L. McKenna/Jack Green) (Note: McKenna voiced the character while Green was the model.) is briefing Becky, her partner, and detective Jack Calvary (Chad Michael Collins/Dawid Kocieda) (Note: Collins voiced the character while Kocieda was the model.) on more unsolved murder victims. Calvary antagonizes Becky, and the meeting is dismissed.

As Finn's execution date is approaching, his lawyer contacts Felicity to tell her that Finn wants to make a confession. Finn claims to Felicity that he falsely confessed to being the Trapper, and that the real killer is Adam Jones, his old friend from Las Palmas Orphanage. Finn claims Jones' motive for the killings was fueled by Rominski's physical abuse of him when he was a child, adding that Rominski had regularly abused children at the orphanage. Finn claims he was double-crossed by Jones, who promised him he would be freed after his false confessions. Finn offers to draw a map and can overpower Felicity if she lets her guard down.

After Felicity presents the lead on Jones to the Third Precinct, it is discovered that the orphanage housed a child with Jones' name, but he supposedly died in the fire that shut down the orphanage. She is told by medical examiner Simon Hillary (Gabriel Schwalenstocker/Leonardo Patane) (Note: Schwalenstocker voiced the character while Patane was the model.) that there was no reason to suspect another killer besides Finn. Becky recounts an incident where she attended to a break-in in progress at a trailer park, where she found social worker Catherine Hope (Catherine Haena Kim/Zara Sparkes) (Note: Kim voiced the character while Sparkes was the model.) tied up and gagged with a bomb strapped to her. Depending on actions, Becky either finds all the clues and saves Hope or escapes while Hope is killed in the explosion. It is later revealed that Hope worked at the orphanage and that the children reported Rominski's abuse of them to her, but she did nothing to stop it. Finn had supposedly left a hair at the scene of Hope's capture. Hillary reports that he ran the DNA through their database and Finn came up as the match.

Becky and Felicity can develop a personal relationship or keep it professional. This results in Felicity looking into the Trapper victims with Becky or by herself. They note the victims were all connected to the Las Palmas Orphanage: alcoholic undertaker Rupert Walsh, orderly Frederick LeMay, social worker Catherine Hope, and Father Rominski. She notices photos of mouse traps in the files, which she can be informed by Riggs is a signature of the Trapper.

Calvary is later killed alongside a first responding officer in a bombing with the same M.O. as the Trapper. Surveillance footage shows Calvary meeting with a prostitute before his demise. The officers start to suspect Becky of being the real Trapper due to her feud with Calvary. Hillary examines Calvary's body but doesn't permit Becky to have a closer look, and another explosion almost kills them all. Becky can choose to provide an alibi for the night of Calvary's murder; not providing one causes suspicion of her to increase.

=== Part 2 ===
Riggs debriefs the officers on Calvary's murder, saying they are treating it as a Trapper copycat. He also formally introduces Felicity, saying she is familiar with the Trapper and is here to assist the investigation. Felicity has the choice to request for Vanstone to grant Finn a temporary release, but Becky can persuade her not to proceed, believing Finn to be dangerous and untrustworthy.

Becky attempts to interview sanitation worker Vernon LeMay (Larry Fessenden), the brother of Frederick, who flees upon encountering Becky. If caught, he reveals that Frederick was an orderly at the orphanage and sold drugs to the Third Precinct, which caused the precinct to cover up the reports of abuse at the orphanage. Becky then visits the house of Jody Johnson (Deonna Bouye/Storm Stewart), (Note: Bouye voiced the character while Stewart was the model.) who is Walsh's widow. Johnson states that Walsh was an abusive alcoholic, and criticizes the police for not helping her when she reported that he was abusing her. Becky also investigates the remains of the orphanage, where she encounters a hooded suspect. She chases the figure, and may catch a glimpse of his face if she keeps up. Regardless, the figure escapes.

Becky revisits the scene of Calvary's murder, where she encounters the hooded figure again. She then calls her partner, saying they need to meet and talk. As the act ends, a feminine figure is seen sewing something into an unseen gagged victim.

=== Part 3 ===
If Cardenas survived the prologue, she can be brought to the police station, where she reveals that Jones became a "police doctor." This causes Becky's partner to realize that Jones is Hillary. Jones stole the identity of the real Hillary and covered his tracks while employed as the medical examiner. It can also be discovered that Jones was orphaned because his mother shot his father to death after suffering repeated physical abuse. Judge Vanstone later sentenced Jones' mother to life imprisonment without the possibility of parole and barred her from seeing Jones. Jones' mother subsequently committed suicide in prison, fueling Jones' disdain for Vanstone even more. It can also be found that Jones worked odd jobs for Walsh, and noticed that Walsh repeatedly beat his wife and hired prostitutes. Becky meets with her partner at a restaurant, and can tell him she returned to the scene of Calvary's murder or that Hillary is Jones, but her partner dismisses her and leaves.

There are a number of endings:

- Becky consumes a drugged drink at the restaurant and awakens in a rundown house next to Vanstone, who has a bomb planted in his stomach. She can either save Vanstone, be killed alongside him in the explosion, shoot him dead and survive, or flee and leave him to die. In the latter two cases, she is framed as the Trapper and is confronted by her partner outside, who shoot her dead.
- Becky is attacked in her car by a waitress. If Becky succeeds in fending her off, the waitress escapes in a car with Becky in hot pursuit. She finds that the license plate of the waitress’ car is registered to "Simon Hillary", revealing that she was Jones dressed as a woman. She calls her partner for backup and follows Jones into his house, which he attempts to burn down to dispose of the evidence. They fight, and Jones holds Becky's partner at gunpoint. The results of the conflict depend on the player's completion of QTEs. If the QTEs are successful, Becky shoots Jones and arrests him with her partner.
- Becky and Felicity work together and track down Jones to his house, which they find him attempting to burn down. Finn also appears if he was granted temporary release. Jones attacks them, and Finn's alignment depends on the player's treatment of him. The results of the fight depend on the player's completion of QTEs.

If Becky was framed as the Trapper, a post-credits scene shows Hillary buying more mouse traps.

== Development ==
Supermassive Games served as the game's developer, using Unreal Engine 4.

Hidden Agenda was announced at E3 2017, along with a launch trailer promoting support for the PlayLink feature.

== Reception ==
Hidden Agenda received "mixed or average" reviews according to review aggregator Metacritic.

Reception

Aggregate score
Aggregator	Score
Metacritic	66/100

Review scores
Publication	Score
Computer Games Magazine	8/10
Game Informer	8/10
Hardcore Gamer	3.5/5
Push Square	6/10

== Awards ==
The game won the award for "Best of E3" at the GamesRadar+ E3 Awards.

Year	Award	Category	Result	Ref
2017	Game Critics Awards	Best Mobile/Handheld	Nominated	
2017	Game Critics Awards	Best Family/Social Game	Won	
2017	Gamescom 2017	Best Social/Online Game	Nominated	
2017	Gamescom 2017	Best Casual Game	Won	
2018	National Academy of Video Game Trade Reviewers Awards	Control Design, 2D or Limited 3D	Nominated	
2018	National Academy of Video Game Trade Reviewers Awards	Innovation in Game Technology	Nominated	
2018	Develop Awards	Writing or Narrative Design	Nominated	
2018	Develop Awards	Gameplay Innovation	Won	
2018	The Independent Game Developers' Association Awards	Best Social Game	Won	
