= I Can See You (film) =

- DVD cover
- Directed by: Graham Reznick
- Written by: Graham Reznick
- Produced by: Peter Phok; Graham Reznick
- Starring: Ben Dickinson; Christopher Ford; Duncan Skiles; Heather Robb; Olivia Villanti; Larry Fessenden
- Cinematography: Gordon Arkenberg
- Edited by: Graham Reznick; Neal Jonas
- Music by: Jeff Grace
- Production companies: Glass Eye Pix; Aphasiafilms
- Distributed by: Kino International; Glass Eye Pix; Cinema Purgatorio
- Release date: January 6, 2008
- Running time: 97 minutes
- Country: United States
- Language: English

I Can See You is a 2008 American psychological horror film written and directed by Graham Reznick. Ben Dickinson, Christopher Ford, and Duncan Skiles star as advertising workers who go on a camping trip to find inspiration for their latest campaign, only to find their sanity tested in the woods.

== Plot ==
In an infomercial, Mickey Hauser, a spokesperson for Clara Clean Corporation, advertises Claractix, a cleaning product. Ben Richards attempts to finish a portrait of a man in a suit, but he can not visualize the face, which remains blank. After several attempts, he gives up and shaves off his beard. When he meets with his coworkers, radio and newspaper reports reveal that Hauser has died and that Clara Clean Corporation has become involved in an ecological scandal. Richards and his coworkers have been recruited to come up with an ecologically themed advertising campaign to counter this scandal, but Doug Quaid rejects all of John Kimble's stock photography. Ben suggests that they go to a Delaware campsite to seek inspiration and take their own photographs. Meanwhile, Sonia Roja's boss tells her that her boyfriend, Kimble, has one week to come up with a fantastic advertising campaign. Unless it is fantastic, Roja will take the fall. Quaid, too, feverishly repeats that the campaign must be fantastic.

Richards, Quaid, Kimble, and Roja set off for the campsite. On the way, Kimble receives a phone call from Ivan, who invites them to a barbecue. Kimble tells Richards that a mysterious person will be there along with them, though he refuses to reveal who. When they arrive, Quaid unsuccessfully flirts with Roja, who is more interested in her cell phone than him, and Richards takes some photographs, all of which come out distorted. At Ivan's barbecue, Richards sees Summer Day, an acquaintance upon whom he once had a crush. Encouraged by Quaid, Richards approaches her, and they embrace. Richards and Day go off into the woods on their own and have sex, though Richards later denies to Quaid that they had sex. The next day, Richards and Day go swimming. Quaid teases Richards about going into the water with his glasses on, and Richards removes his glasses, which leaves his vision blurred and unfocused. In the water, Richards fumbles in conversation with Day, and she wanders off into the wilderness with Quaid.

Kimble dismisses Richards' concerns when Quaid and Day do not return, and Roja denies Kimble's insistence that something is bothering her. Kimble encourages Richards to take more photographs, but they turn out to be similarly distorted. Hauser critiques Richards' photography and suggests that his camera's lens may need cleaning. Disturbed by the camera's malfunction and his hallucination, Richards returns to camp and recruits a reluctant Kimble to search for Quaid and Day. The two wander through the forest, where they find Day's underwear, blood on a rock, and a memory card; however, they locate no sign of Quaid or Day. They give up and head back to the camp. While viewing the images on the memory card, Kimble's laptop malfunctions, and the images are destroyed. Roja complains of hearing voices and eerie sounds in the forest, but Kimble reacts skeptically, and they all go to sleep.

Richards has a strange dream or vision involving a musical number performed by Quaid and Day. When he awakens, Quaid has returned to the camp, disoriented and manic. Roja watches over Quaid as Kimble and Richards check the camp; disturbed by Quaid's behavior, Roja calls for assistance, and Quaid bolts into the forest. Richards chases after Quaid, and, in the light, finds blood on Quaid's hands. Quaid runs off again, and Richards finds his body at the bottom of a cliff. Hauser appears and tells Richards to take a second look at the cliff, this time without his glasses; he does and throws his glasses over the edge. He is then approached by a corpse-like Day, upon whom he can not focus. Richards hallucinates extensively, and, upon returning to the camp, he discovers that Kimble has murdered Roja. Richards puts out Kimble's eyes, opens his skull, and extracts a serrated knife from Kimble's head. He hallucinates further and cuts out the face from his father's portrait.

== Cast ==
- Ben Dickinson as Ben Richards
- Duncan Skiles as Doug Quaid
- Christopher Ford as John Kimble
- Olivia Villanti as Sonia Roja
- Heather Robb as Summer Day
- Larry Fessenden as Mickey Hauser
- Neal Jonas as Ivan
- William K. Healy as Sonia's boss

Many of the characters' names are the same as characters in Arnold Schwarzenegger films The Running Man, Total Recall, Kindergarten Cop, and Red Sonja.

== Production ==
Director Graham Reznick originally worked as a sound designer, recordist, and assistant director for Ti West, who is a childhood friend. The Viewer, a short film that is included with the DVD release of I Can See You was intended to be an introduction to Reznick's experimental, surrealistic style. Videodrome was a big influence on Reznick, and the final scenes in I Can See You are inspired by that film. The film came from an idea that West and he had: both would write and direct a film about a group of people who go into the woods. Reznick focused on the experimental qualities of the film, as he knew that he would not be given as much freedom on future projects.

== Release ==
After its initial, limited theatrical release distributed by Cinema Purgatorio, I Can See You was picked up for VOD and DVD by Kino International. The film was released on DVD on October 27, 2009.

== Reception ==
Rotten Tomatoes, a review aggregator, reports that 100% of five surveyed critics gave the film a positive review; the average rating was 7.5/10. Joshua Siebalt of Dread Central rated the film 3/5 stars and called it "one of the most indefinable films I think I’ve ever seen." Nathan Lee of The New York Times wrote, "David Lynch is the key influence here, and Mr. Reznick proves himself a keen disciple of the master. I Can See You heralds a splendid new filmmaker with one eye on genre mechanics, one eye on avant-garde conceits and a third eye for transcendental weirdness." Samuel Zimmerman of Fangoria rated it 3.5/4 stars and called it "without a doubt one of the most intriguing and well-crafted low-budget horror films in recent memory." Steve Ericson of Baltimore City Paper wrote that I Can See You is "a horror film that succeeds on its own terms, rather than looking like a bid to direct a Saw sequel. I Can See You is a true adventure: Reznick has gone into the wilderness and come back with an extremely promising feature debut." Andrew O'Heir of Salon wrote that the film "goes from comic-realistic mode into full-on psycho meltdown with more terrifying adroitness than any other movie of this decade. Just out on DVD. See. It. Now." Ronny Scheib of Variety wrote, "Atmospheric audio fills each leaf and branch with nameless menace, while superimpositions and slow dissolves trace a psychological slide toward disintegration." Scheib states that the film could develop a cult following. Nicolas Rapold of The Village Voice wrote, "So much about this movie and its characters should be annoying, but the sensory disorientation climaxes in a freakout that wipes all your troubles away, as well as anything else lying around in your head."
