= Cellar Door (film) =

- Promotional poster
- Directed by: Vaughn Stein
- Written by: Sam Scott; Lori Evans Taylor
- Produced by: Tom Butterfield; Craig Perry; Sheila Hanahan Taylor; John Papsidera
- Starring: Jordana Brewster; Scott Speedman; Laurence Fishburne; Addison Timlin
- Distributed by: Lionsgate
- Release date: November 1, 2024
- Running time: 97 minutes
- Country: United States
- Language: English

Cellar Door (formerly titled The Offer) is a 2024 American thriller film written by Sam Scott and Lori Evans Taylor, directed by Vaughn Stein and starring Jordana Brewster, Scott Speedman, Laurence Fishburne and Addison Timlin.

== Plot ==
Couple John and Sera look for a new home. Their quest proves challenging and their real estate agent, Jeannie, suggests they consult Emmett Claymore, a long-time resident with extensive knowledge of the area. Despite initial reservations, John and Sera visit Emmett's secluded, grand estate. Emmett welcomes them, and during their interaction, he offers them his house under one condition: they must never open the cellar door. Intrigued, they accept the offer, brushing aside the stipulation. As they settle into their new residence, the couple hosts a housewarming party. The celebration takes an unsettling turn when a stranger arrives, warning them to "burn it down before it's too late". This incident plants seeds of doubt, particularly in John, who becomes increasingly curious about the forbidden cellar.

Simultaneously, John's past indiscretions resurface. Alyssa, a colleague with whom John had an affair, files a sexual harassment claim against him, leading to a temporary suspension from work. John's attempts to reconcile and resolve the situation only entangle him further, especially when Alyssa mysteriously disappears after a heated confrontation. Her car is later found abandoned, prompting a police investigation that points toward John. Sera, unaware of the full extent of John's involvement with Alyssa, begins to notice inconsistencies in his behavior.

The discovery of a bullet hole in their home intensifies the tension, with John suspecting a connection to Emmett's past and the cellar's secret. Driven by paranoia and guilt, John contacts Paul McManus, a previous resident of the house. Paul reveals that the house exploits the occupants' hidden secrets, leading to their downfall. Determined to uncover the truth, John attempts to break open the cellar door. Sera strikes him from behind, knocking him unconscious. When he regains consciousness, she confesses that she has known about his affair and that she killed Alyssa, hiding the body in the cellar. John moves to leave and report her to the police, telling her he will arrange a lawyer for her. Sera draws a gun on him and issues an ultimatum: if he exposes the truth, she will kill him and tell police she acted in self-defense, framing him for both the affair and the murder; if he remains silent, they can continue their life together. John acquiesces. Months later, Sera hosts a baby shower with John in attendance. Emmett sends them a key to the cellar door, accompanied by a note congratulating them on making the house a home and stating that he believes they already know what's inside.

== Cast ==
- Jordana Brewster as Sera
- Scott Speedman as John
- Laurence Fishburne as Emmett
- Addison Timlin as Alyssa
- Chris Conner as Paul McManus

== Production ==
In February 2023, it was announced that Brewster, Speedman, Fishburne and Timlin were cast in the film and that Lionsgate acquired its worldwide sales rights.

== Release ==
The film was released on November 1, 2024.

== Reception ==
Peyton Robinson of RogerEbert.com awarded the film one and a half stars out of four.

Dennis Harvey of Variety gave the film a negative review and wrote, "Vaughn Stein’s thriller is too simplistic and implausible to provide any chills. But despite some lurid eventual plot elements, it’s also too blandly slick in a TV-movie mode to offer much trashy fun."
