= Crumb Catcher =

2023 film directed by Chris Skotchdopole

- Film poster
- Directed by: Chris Skotchdopole
- Screenplay by: Chris Skotchdopole
- Story by: Chris Skotchdopole; Larry Fessenden; Rigo Garay
- Starring: Rigo Garay; Ella Rae Peck; John Speredakos; Lorraine Farris
- Production companies: Glass Eye Pix; Music Box Films; Gigantic Pictures
- Release date: 2023
- Running time: 103 minutes
- Country: United States
- Language: English

Crumb Catcher is a 2023 American thriller film written and directed by Chris Skotchdopole (in his debut feature), starring Rigo Garay, Ella Rae Peck, John Speredakos, and Lorraine Farris. Its plot features a newlywed couple on their honeymoon who get an unwelcome visitor during the night.

== Synopsis ==
After blacking out on his wedding night, Shane and his wife head to a remote estate for their honeymoon. That night, they're visited by a waiter and bartender from the reception, who blackmail Shane for something he can’t remember doing. But the blackmailers don’t just want money. They’re after business partners for their invention, an outlandish device called the Crumb Catcher.

== Cast ==
- Rigo Garay as Shane
- Ella Rae Peck as Leah
- John Speredakos as John
- Lorraine Farris as Rose

== Premiere ==
Crumb Catcher premiered in the United States on September 24, 2023 at Fantastic Fest before making its nationwide theatrical debut at AMC and Alamo Drafthouse theaters on July 19, 2024.

== Reception ==
Crumb Catcher landed with strong critical enthusiasm. Hailed as "an insanely impressive directorial feature debut" (Collider) and "a skillfully wrought, twisty suspense tale" (Variety). Slate Magazine's Steven Nguyen Scaife described it as "a tantalizing mix of the absurd and the mundane."

The Hollywood Reporter named it one of the Best Horror Films of 2024, "Deranged, topical, and surprisingly tender, even in its moments of violence, Crumb Catcher is a highlight of indie filmmaking, showcasing just what can be accomplished with an original idea, talented collaborators, and a vision that finds honesty in the messes people can make of their lives."

Maggie Lovitt of Collider awarded the film a 7/10, praising it as "funny, bizarre, uncomfortable, and an absolute cringe-fest for all the best reasons," while Variety's Dennis Harvey states "If you can withstand spending nearly two hours in the company of these grating, argumentative characters, there are rewards to be had in a skillfully wrought, twisty suspense tale..."

Crumb Catcher took home both the Gold Audience Award and Best Ensemble Cast at the Brooklyn Horror Film Festival.

The film is Certified Fresh on the review aggregator website Rotten Tomatoes, 88% of 40 critics' reviews are positive. The website's consensus reads: "An impressively assured directorial debut, Crumb Catcher blends absurd politeness, marital tension, and dark comedy into an uncomfortable, wickedly funny home invasion horror." On Metacritic, the film has a weighted average score of 57 out of 100 based on 7 critics, which the site labels as "mixed or average" reviews.
