= Skin and Bones (Fear Itself) =

- Fear Itself episode
- Grady grabbing his son Tim
- Episode no.: Season 1 Episode 8
- Directed by: Larry Fessenden
- Written by: Drew McWeeny, Rebecca Swan
- Original air date: July 31, 2008

Guest appearances
- Doug Jones; Molly Hagan; John Pyper-Ferguson; Cole Heppell; Brett Dier; Gordon Tootoosis; Julian Christopher

Episode chronology
← Previous "Community"	Next → "Something with Bite"

"Skin and Bones", also stylized as "Skin & Bones", is the eighth episode in the television series Fear Itself on NBC. The plot revolves around a man who becomes possessed by a Wendigo.

The episode was the last of the series to air before Fear Itself was put on hiatus due to the summer Olympics. It was cancelled before it was able to air the remaining five episodes.

== Plot ==
Grady, a rural ranch owner, and his friends went out hunting in the cold mountains. Rowdy, his brother, has been tending to the farm in his absence with Grady's wife Elena and her two sons, Derek and Tim. Ten days have passed, and no one has heard from the hunting party. The sheriff and rescue parties have called off the search until the weather improves. Rowdy is preparing to go himself when he and Elena see Grady hobbling towards the house. He, along with Eddie Bear, a Native American who lives with the family, rushes out to help Grady. He is visibly injured and suffering from frostbite. The family recovers him and puts him to bed in his bedroom.

When the family goes up to check on him, they notice that he doesn't look like he did before. A doctor visits and inspects him and tells the family it's amazing Grady survived. He comments that Grady must have found something to eat while lost in the wilderness but has lost a lot of weight, and instructs them to make sure he's hydrated and fed since his only words have been that he's hungry. When they try to feed him, he slaps a tray of soup out of one of the boy's hands, and shortly after licks Elena's arm, telling her she tastes good. She leaves him in bed, clearly unsettled.

That night, Rowdy and Eddie Bear hear a strange howling noise outside and distressed neighing coming from the horse stables. They investigate and see that one of their horses has been slaughtered. The following day, Eddie Bear confronts Grady with a knife and tells Grady about his uncle who also disappeared in the woods and turned up weeks later, looking very much how Grady looks now before murdering his own family. Eddie tries to convince Grady to let go of what's "eating him". Grady mocks and taunts him that it would look bad for a ranch owner to be killed by a "bitter old Indian", and Eddie backs down and leaves. Later, Eddie Bear tells Rowdy that his uncle was possessed by a Wendigo—and murdered his family—ultimately being gunned down by the police. Eddie Bear believes Grady has been possessed as well and tries to convince Rowdy.

Grady's wife Elena checks on him. He speaks to Elena as the real Grady might have, explaining to her that he and his three fellow hunters got lost. To shelter themselves from the cold, they took refuge in a cave. Two went for help and never came back. Grady began hearing a voice that told him to let it in and instructed him that he had to eat—and he implies that he killed and ate the other hunter left with him. Elena is obviously disturbed and frightened and tries to leave his room, but Grady attacks her, grabbing her by the throat with talons he didn't have before, drooling over her as if he might bite her. Rowdy intervenes with a gun, and Grady flees back to his room making screeching noises and howling noises like the ones they heard in the night and breaking things in his bedroom.

Eddie Bear walks upstairs to kill Grady after telling Rowdy and Elena to take the kids and hide while he confronts Grady, but he is attacked and killed in Grady's room. Rowdy heads back into the house and tries the same, but Grady successfully guilt-trips Rowdy into lowering the gun. Rowdy comes to his senses, however, and raises the gun to shoot Grady, but he is also attacked and killed. Elena hears the shot from the barn and attempts to flee in the truck with her children, but is confronted and stopped by Grady whom is carrying Rowdy's corpse. Derek and Tim hide as Grady drags Elena into the kitchen. He puts Rowdy's corpse on the table—and instructs Elena to chop him up and cook him.

She reluctantly does, trying to draw attention away from Derek who sneaks in to retrieve and load a rifle. Grady eats some of Rowdy and forces Elena to taste the corpse while blaming her for his condition before attacking her again, but then Derek barges in and shoots Grady. Grady survives the shot and escapes. Elena is injured but instructs Derek to go find Tim before Grady does. The boys have a showdown with Grady who now appears more monstrous than ever. Grady attacks Tim, telling them that he is not their father, implying their real father was Rowdy, whom Elena had been having an affair with. Tim bites Grady and Derek shoots him, but again Grady survives being shot and overpowers the boys. He is about to kill Derek when Elena sticks the rifle barrel in his mouth and shoots him, this time killing him. The episode ends with the boys and their mother facing each other over the corpse as an unnatural howl sounds out in the cold surrounding night.

== Cast ==
- Molly Hagan as Elena Edlund
- Doug Jones as Grady Edlund
- John Pyper-Ferguson as Rowdy Edlund
- Gordon Tootoosis as Eddie Bear
- Brett Dier as Derek Edlund
- Cole Heppell as Tim Edlund
- Julian Christopher as Doctor

== Reception ==
Dread Central and Bloody Disgusting both reviewed "Skin and Bones". Dread Central rated the episode at 3 1/2 out of 5 blades, criticizing its dialogue while also stating that it "was one of the strongest episodes of Fear Itself to date". Bloody Disgusting was more critical, writing that "SKIN AND BONES fails mostly because it’s boring. Jones scenes are great acting exercises but in the end they service a script that has no sense of foreboding and no new elements to titillate viewers imaginations."
