= Birth of the Living Dead =

- Theatrical release poster
- Directed by: Rob Kuhns
- Written by: Rob Kuhns
- Produced by: Rob Kuhns; Esther Cassidy
- Cinematography: Suprotim Bose; Michael Grippo
- Edited by: Rob Kuhns
- Music by: Gary Pozner; Brian Gross
- Production companies: Glass Eye Pix; Predestinate Productions
- Distributed by: First Run Features
- Release date: October 19, 2012 (Tallgrass Film Festival)
- Running time: 76 minutes
- Country: United States
- Language: English

Birth of the Living Dead (sometimes known by its working title Year of the Living Dead) is a 2012 American documentary film directed by Rob Kuhns. It is about the 1968 horror film Night of the Living Dead and that film's legacy. It features interviews with Night of the Living Dead director George A. Romero, Elvis Mitchell, Jason Zinoman, Larry Fessenden, Gale Anne Hurd, and Mark Harris.

== Synopsis ==
Rob Kuhns interviews a range of authors, critics, and filmmakers about the impact, legacy, and enduring popularity of Night of the Living Dead. Romero describes the film's background, production, and distribution, including how it accidentally fell into the public domain. Fessenden describes Night of the Living Dead's aspects of postmodernist film, including an early commentary on horror films inside of a horror film – Johnny's taunting of his sister, Barbra, in the opening graveyard scene. Hurd cites the film as an influence on her own work as executive producer of The Walking Dead. Mitchell, among other things, describes how the film presents a strong Black male as the protagonist of a film without resorting to racial commentary. The final scene, in which Duane Jones' character, Ben, is killed by a posse is compared to historical footage of 1960s lynch mobs and police brutality, and scenes of violent zombie attacks are compared to footage from Vietnam broadcast on television.

== Interviews ==
- George A. Romero, director and co-writer of Night of the Living Dead
- Elvis Mitchell, film critic
- Jason Zinoman, author and critic
- Mark Harris, journalist
- Larry Fessenden, actor, producer, and director
- Gale Anne Hurd, producer
- Bill Hinzman, actor from Night of the Living Dead
- a Bronx schoolteacher who uses it as an aid during a Literacy Through Film class
- people who saw it on its first release

== Production ==
Fessenden, who also executive produced, became a fan of Night of the Living Dead after he saw it on television in the 1970s. After Fessenden was contacted for an interview, he offered to help out. Several other people, such as John A. Russo, were contacted, but they declined involvement.

The original score was conceived and created by Gary Pozner. He is a former keyboard player for the alternative rock band Tom Tom Club and toured with Talking Heads. Over his career, he has collaborated with legendary artists such as Peter Gabriel, Lou Reed, The Ramones, and Debbie Harry.

Pozner partnered directly with guitarist Brian Goss to handle the unique demands of the film. Because Birth of the Living Dead deals heavily with the bleak, socio-political realities of 1968—including the Vietnam War, political assassinations, and racial tension—the music needed to feel both historically grounded and modernly terrifying.

Together, Goss and Pozner avoided a traditional Hollywood orchestral style. Instead, they focused on heavy ambient soundscapes, industrial/electronic rock rhythms, and creeping sub-bass textures to mimic the relentless panic of George A. Romero's classic zombie film.

== Release ==
Birth of the Living Dead premiered at the Tallgrass Film Festival on October 19, 2012. It was released to iTunes on October 15, 2013, and received a limited release on October 18.

== Reception ==
Rotten Tomatoes, a review aggregator, reports that 96% of 23 surveyed critics gave the film a positive review; the average rating is 6.8/10. Metacritic rated it 65/100 based on nine reviews. Frank Scheck of The Hollywood Reporter wrote, "Although highly entertaining, this loving tribute to Romero's cult classic could have used a little more meat on its zombie bones". Owen Gleiberman of Entertainment Weekly rated it A and wrote that it is "full of juicy anecdotes". Andy Webster of The New York Times made it a NYT Critics' Pick and called Romero "a most agreeable raconteur". The Los Angeles Times called it "a nifty little tribute" that lacks commentary about Romero's later work.

Jeff Shannon of The Seattle Times wrote that the film "pays wide-ranging tribute to an enduring pop-cultural milestone". Ernest Hardy of The Village Voice wrote, "What distinguishes this doc from much of the tedious critical prose Romero has inspired is the fan-boy and fan-girl ardor that fuels its smarts". Joshua Rothkopf of Time Out New York rated it 4/5 stars and wrote that the film finds interesting analysis not already covered by previous works. Chuck Bowen of Slant Magazine rated it 2.5/4 stars and wrote that the documentary is charming despite its lack of new information. A. A. Dowd of The A.V. Club rated it C+ and also criticized its lack of new insights. Noel Murray of The Dissolve rated it 3/5 stars and called it "little more than a glorified DVD featurette" but still enjoyable. Eric Ortiz Garcia of Twitch Film wrote, "Kuhns' love letter to Romero's masterpiece is a welcome and fresh addition to our history of the modern screen zombie."
