= Best Man Down =

- Theatrical release poster
- Directed by: Ted Koland
- Written by: Ted Koland
- Produced by: David Abbitt; Jen Roskind; Sharyn Steele
- Starring: Justin Long; Jess Weixler; Tyler Labine; Addison Timlin; Shelley Long; Frances O'Connor
- Cinematography: Seamus Tierney
- Edited by: Grant Myers
- Music by: Mateo Messina
- Production company: Koda Entertainment
- Distributed by: Magnolia Pictures
- Release dates: October 20, 2012 (Twin Cities Film Festival); November 8, 2013 (United States)
- Running time: 89 minutes
- Country: United States
- Language: English
- Budget: $1.5 million
- Box office: $1,938

Best Man Down is an American comedy drama film written and directed by Ted Koland and starring Justin Long, Jess Weixler, Addison Timlin, and Tyler Labine.

The film was primarily shot in the Twin Cities and premiered in the fall of 2012 at The Hamptons International Film Festival under the original title "LUMPY." The film was also chosen to close the Twin Cities Film Fest in October 2012 and was the black tie gala screening for the Catalina Film Festival in September 2013. It was released theatrically in the United States by Magnolia Pictures on November 8, 2013, but had primary distribution through digital channels.

== Plot ==
Minnesotans Scott and his bride Kristin are having their wedding in Phoenix. During the wedding, Kristin is put off by the obnoxious behavior of Scott's best man Lumpy. Lumpy gets extremely drunk and more annoying to the guests until he is cut off from the bar by Scott. Returning to his hotel room, Lumpy continues drinking and carrying on until he accidentally falls and cracks his skull before passing out. He awakens a short time later disoriented and bleeding, and gets himself locked out of the hotel. Wandering into the brush, Lumpy passes out and dies on top of a cactus. He is found the next morning and Scott and Kristin are informed. Since Lumpy was his best friend, Scott feels it is his duty to arrange for Lumpy to be returned to Minnesota for a funeral. Kristin is upset that her honeymoon will be postponed, but she supports Scott in his decision. After arranging transport for the body, they return to Minneapolis to contact Lumpy's friends and plan the funeral.

Meanwhile, in a small town in Northern Minnesota, Ramsey Anderson is a fifteen-year-old girl living with her mom and her mom's boyfriend. Her mom is a drug addict with a history of moving around, and her mom's boyfriend is a former soldier in Iraq who has turned to cooking meth to make money. Ramsey catches the local priest with another man in his home where they spent the night together and tacitly blackmails him out of $50, which she uses to purchase groceries for their house. Later on, she deliberately allows herself to be caught shoplifting cold medicine so that she wouldn't have to supply it to her mom's boyfriend and is bailed out by the same priest.

Kristin and Scott find Ramsey's name in Lumpy's phone and try to contact her, but she doesn't answer. They visit his old law school and job to try to locate Ramsey, but discover that Lumpy suddenly quit school and was fired from his job for embezzling tips from the bar. The bar manager tells them that Lumpy was involved with a girl, whom they deduce to be Ramsey. After an uncomfortable argument at Christmas dinner, Kristin pushes Scott to drive up to Ramsey's town and find her. In flashbacks, Ramsey is shown meeting Lumpy ten months earlier when he knocked on her door asking for permission to cut across her parents property to go ice fishing. After catching a fish, Lumpy falls through the ice and is rescued by Ramsey. He takes her back to his hotel room where they both get cleaned up, but end up having an argument after he asks her to leave. The hotel clerk calls the police on Lumpy and he is arrested, but released after Ramsey shows the police the fishing hole and accident. After this, Lumpy begins visiting Ramsey more frequently and the two develop a close friendship.

Scott and Kristin arrive in Ramsey's town and find her house. They tell her that Lumpy has died and offer to give her details about the funeral, but instead she asks them to leave. Finding a hotel for the night, Scott admits that he quit his job after being denied a commission and that the money for their honeymoon was a gift from Lumpy. The next morning, Ramsey finds them at the hotel and asks for a ride to Minneapolis for the funeral. She tells them she is pregnant with Lumpy's baby and needs to leave. They take her home to get permission from her mom, and are confronted by the mom's gun-wielding boyfriend who believes they are police. Ramsey's mom, realizing that this is Ramsey's chance to get away from this lifestyle, gives her money and tells her that she may go.

Back in Minneapolis, Ramsey gets into an argument with Kristin and Scott when she reveals Lumpy's biggest secret, that he had a heart defect and knew he was dying. After fighting, Ramsey walks out. The next day at the funeral Ramsey delivers a powerful eulogy, replete with information about Lumpy that no one knew but her. Afterwards, she admits to Scott that she is not pregnant and that Lumpy was a true gentleman who was never intimate with her. Lumpy's mom gives Ramsey an envelope with some money in it that he left for her, and tells her there's more in a safe deposit box and that Lumpy meant for her to pay for her college with it. Ramsey sees the priest's boyfriend from earlier at the funeral and realizes it's Scott's boss Rick. She takes him aside and talks to him, leading to Scott getting his job back.

The next day, Ramsey prepares to catch a bus home when Scott reveals that her mom called. Her mom left her boyfriend and was moving, and gave Ramsey permission to live with Scott and Kristin until she gets on her feet. Scott asks what Ramsey told his boss to get his job back, and she coyly responds that he probably doesn't want to know. The film ends with them all preparing to go out for dinner.

== Cast ==
- Justin Long as Scott
- Jess Weixler as Kristin
- Tyler Labine as Lumpy
- Addison Timlin as Ramsey
- Shelley Long as Gail
- Frances O'Connor as Jaime Anderson
- Evan Jones as Winston
- Michael Landes as Priest
- Peter Syversten as Roger
- James Detmar as Uncle Willis
- Jane Hammill as Aunt Helen
- Claudia Wilkens as Lumpy's Mom
- Sasha Andreev as Rick
- Sara Marsh as Bridesmaid
- Corey Anderson as Cousin Neil

== Reception ==
On Rotten Tomatoes, the film has an approval rating of 31% based on reviews from 13 critics. On Metacritic, the film has a score of 36 out of 100, based on reviews from 4 critics, indicating "generally unfavorable" reviews.
