= The Off Season =

- Directed by: James Felix McKenney
- Written by: James Felix McKenney
- Produced by: Larry Fessenden, Glass Eye Pix
- Starring: Christina Campanella; Don Wood; Ruth Kulerman; Angus Scrimm
- Distributed by: Lionsgate Home Entertainment
- Release date: 2004
- Running time: 89 mins
- Country: United States
- Language: English

The Off Season is a 2004 independent horror film written and directed by James Felix McKenney and produced by Larry Fessenden's Glass Eye Pix. It was distributed through Lionsgate Home Entertainment.

== Plot ==
A New York couple, Kathryn and Rick, move to a motel in Maine during the off season, to get away from their hectic routines and so that he can write. They discover their room is haunted by the ghosts of murdered guests, and their experiences drive them apart.

== Cast ==
- Christina Campanella as Kathryn Bennett
- Don Wood as Rick Holland
- Angus Scrimm as Ted
- Larry Fessenden as Phil
- Ruth Kulerman as Mrs. Farthing
- Brenda Cooney as Nora
- Jamie Sneider as Stacy
- Jordan Kratz as Kurt

== Production ==
The Off Season was filmed in Old Orchard Beach, Maine, a town that neighbors the one in which writer and director McKenney grew up and shot his first feature, CanniBalistic.

== Reception ==
One reviewer considered the film "suffer[ed] from a distinct feeling of pointlessness" and the performances were "amateurish". It has low user ratings on the Internet Movie Database.
