= Tales From Beyond the Pale =

Horror podcast

Tales from Beyond the Pale

Presentation
- Hosted by: Larry Fessenden
- Genre: Horror
- Format: Radio drama
- Created by: Larry Fessenden; Glenn McQuaid
- Language: English

Production
- No. of seasons: 3

Publication
- Provider: Glass Eye Pix
- License: Commercial

Related
- Website: talesfrombeyondthepale.com

Tales from Beyond the Pale is a horror podcast inspired by 1930s radio dramas. It is produced by Larry Fessenden and Glenn McQuaid for Glass Eye Pix.

== History ==
Fessenden was introducing old radio dramas to his child when Glenn McQuaid suggested they make their own. Fessenden agreed with him, and the two began producing episodes under Fessenden's studio, Glass Eye Pix. They were influenced by the works of Boris Karloff, Peter Lorre, and Orson Welles. McQuaid said that the project was an effort to reach out to collaborators and produce content without having to make a film. The series is recorded in New York City.

The first season debuted in October 2010. A five-disc box set was released in October 2011. The second season became available on September 13, 2013. It includes stories by Simon Barrett, Joe Maggio, Graham Reznick, McQuaid, and Fessenden. In April 2014, the second season was released in a box set. The series was released on vinyl record in limited numbers in October 2014. Live performances have occurred at the Stanley Film Festival and Fantasia International Film Festival.

== Reception ==
Mark L. Miller of Ain't It Cool News said that the series "most definitely delivers", and Ken W. Hanley of Fangoria called it "one of the best podcast offerings" for horror fans. Reviewing a live performance at Fantasia, Andrew Mack of Twitch Film called it "a terrific night out". Also reviewing a live performance, Evan Dickson of Bloody Disgusting called it "a surprise and a delight".
