= Addison Timlin =

American actress (born 1991)

- Born: June 29, 1991 (age 35); Pennsylvania, U.S.
- Education: Professional Performing Arts School
- Occupation: Actress
- Years active: 2003–present
- Spouse: Jeremy Allen White (m. 2019; sep. 2023)
- Children: 2

Addison Timlin (born June 29, 1991) is an American actress. She played Jami Lerner in The Town That Dreaded Sundown (2014), Colleen Lunsford in Little Sister (2016) and Sasha Bingham in Showtime's Californication.

== Early life and education ==
Addison Timlin grew up in Quakertown, Pennsylvania, and began performing early. At age eight she persuaded her parents to take her to New York City to audition for Annie, winning a supporting role and eventually appearing in numerous professional productions of the musical. After signing with an agent and joining the Broadway revival of Gypsy at the age of 12, her mother relocated the family to Manhattan so Timlin could continue her career in acting.

In New York, the family initially depended on her Broadway earnings until her mother found full-time work. Timlin attended the Professional Performing Arts School, juggling classes with auditions and acting training.

== Career ==
Timlin made her Broadway debut as Baby Louise in the 2003 revival of Gypsy led by Bernadette Peters.

She debuted on the big screen as Amy, a 14-year-old girl with type 1 diabetes, in the 2005 film Derailed alongside Clive Owen and Melissa George, who played her parents. Timlin played Maddy in a short film, The Isabel Fish, directed by Lara Zizic for the Columbia Film Festival. In 2007, Timlin appeared in the music video "Sleeping Lessons" by Albuquerque, New Mexico–based indie-rock band The Shins. In 2008, she made an appearance in the music video for the song "Check Yes Juliet" by We the Kings, playing the fictional Juliet. She was cast in the short-lived CBS television drama 3 lbs as Charlotte Hanson (the daughter of the main character played by Stanley Tucci), in three of the eight episodes that were filmed. Timlin is seen in the short film Man, written and directed by Myna Joseph, which was screened at the Sundance Film Festival and at Cannes. In 2008 she played Emily Draper in the ABC television show Cashmere Mafia, the troubled teenage daughter of Juliet Draper (Miranda Otto).

Timlin was cast in Day One, an NBC midseason replacement TV series which was cut down to a mini-series that never aired. In the fourth season of Californication she portrayed Sasha Bingham, an actress who is in a casual sexual relationship with protagonist Hank Moody (David Duchovny). Timlin appeared in an indie film called Best Man Down, which starred Justin Long. She played the female lead, Stormy Llewellyn, in Stephen Sommers' adaptation of the first book of Dean Koontz's Odd Thomas series, opposite Anton Yelchin as the title character. In February 2012, Timlin was cast in ABC's drama pilot Zero Hour, which was picked up as a mid-season replacement and premiered in February 2013. In May that same year, Timlin joined the cast of the indie romantic comedy The Bounceback. In 2013, Timlin appeared in the action-comedy Stand Up Guys, which starred Al Pacino, Christopher Walken and Alan Arkin.

Timlin was cast as Lucinda "Luce" Price in 2016's Fallen, adapted from Lauren Kate's novel of the same name.

In 2016, Timlin was cast as a female lead in CBS's drama pilot MacGyver, but was dropped from the cast when the network picked up pilot to series. In 2017, Timlin was cast in the second season of Crackle's show StartUp. She played a young Hillary Clinton in the 2019 film When I'm a Moth.

== Personal life ==
Timlin and actor Jeremy Allen White got engaged in April 2019; the couple married on October 18, 2019. The couple has two daughters, born in October 2018 and in December 2020. In May 2023, Timlin filed for divorce.

She has been dating Cooper Raiff since 2024.

== Filmography ==
=== Film ===
Year	Title	Role	Notes
2005	Derailed	Amy Schine	
2006	The Isabel Fish	Maddy	Short film
2008	Man	Allison	Short film
2008	Afterschool	Amy	
2012	Stand Up Guys	Alex	
2012	Best Man Down	Ramsey Anderson	
2013	Love and Air Sex	Haley	
2013	Odd Thomas	Stormy Llewellyn	
2014	That Awkward Moment	Alana	
2014	The Town That Dreaded Sundown	Jami Lerner	
2015	Craggio	Sarah	Short film
2016	Little Sister	Colleen Lunsford	
2016	Fallen	Lucinda Price	
2016	Chronically Metropolitan	Layla	
2016	Long Nights Short Mornings	Rapunzel	
2017	Like Me	Kiya	
2017	Submission	Angela Argo	
2018	When I'm a Moth	Hillary Rodham	
2018	Love Thy Keepers	Sophie	
2018	Sleeping in Plastic	Pearla	
2018	Feast of the Seven Fishes	Katie	
2019	Life Like	Sophie	
2019	Depraved	Shelley	
2019	Chasing You	Kathryn	Short Film
2022	Am I OK?	Lucy's last date	uncredited
2023	Blackout	Sharon	
2024	Cellar Door	Alyssa	

=== Television ===
Year	Title	Role	Notes
2006	3 lbs	Charlotte Hanson	Recurring role, 3 episodes
2008	Cashmere Mafia	Emily Draper	Recurring role, 5 episodes
2009	Law & Order	Hayley Kozlow	Episode: "Memo from the Dark Side"
2010	Day One	Hunter Christiansen	Unaired TV pilot
2011	Californication	Sasha Bingham	Recurring role (season 4), 6 episodes
2011	Law & Order: LA	Erin Gradin	Episode: "Van Nuys"
2013	Zero Hour	Rachel Lewis	Main cast
2016	Girl in the Box	Colleen Stan	TV movie
2017–2018	StartUp	Mara Chandler	Recurring role (season 2); main cast (season 3)
2022	American Horror Stories	Delilah	Episode: "Milkmaids"
2024	High Potential	Brooke Kirkman	Episode: "One of Us"
2025	Hal & Harper	Audrey	
