= James LeGros =

American actor

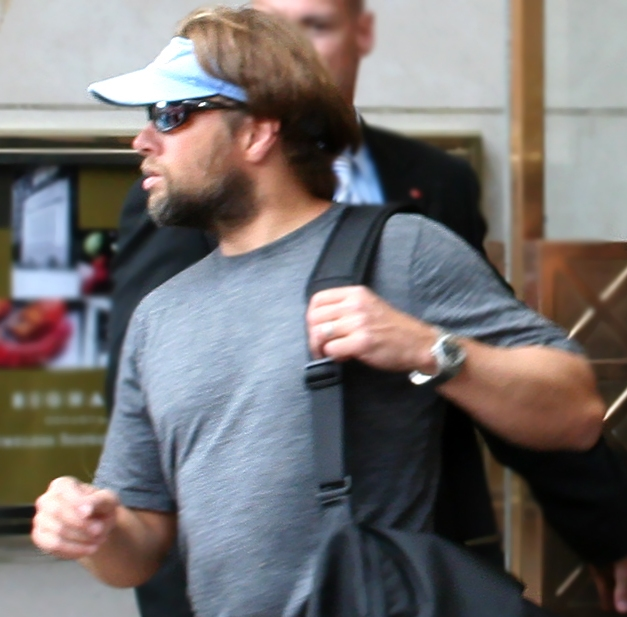
- Le Gros at the 2006 Toronto International Film Festival
- Born: April 27, 1962 (age 64); Minneapolis, Minnesota, United States
- Occupation: Actor
- Years active: 1984–present
- Spouse: Kristina Loggia (m. 1992)
- Children: 2
- Relatives: Robert Loggia (father-in-law)

James LeGros (/ləˈɡroʊ/) (born April 27, 1962) is an American actor. He was nominated for the Independent Spirit Award for Best Supporting Male for his role in Living in Oblivion.

== Career ==
Le Gros starred in Gus Van Sant's film Drugstore Cowboy and had a role for Living in Oblivion, where he played Chad Palomino, a self-centered actor with endless "a-list" star demands for a "b-movie" director and crew. He had a prominent role opposite Patrick Swayze and Keanu Reeves in the 1991 action adventure film Point Break as bank robber, Roach. Le Gros appeared on Showtime's Sleeper Cell (as Special Agent Ray Fuller) and on Law & Order. He was also a cast member on the television series Ally McBeal and guest-starred on Roseanne, Punky Brewster, The Outer Limits, and Friends. He portrayed Dr. Dan Harris on the NBC series Mercy. Le Gros portrayed Peter Gray in the Dark Sky thriller Bitter Feast.

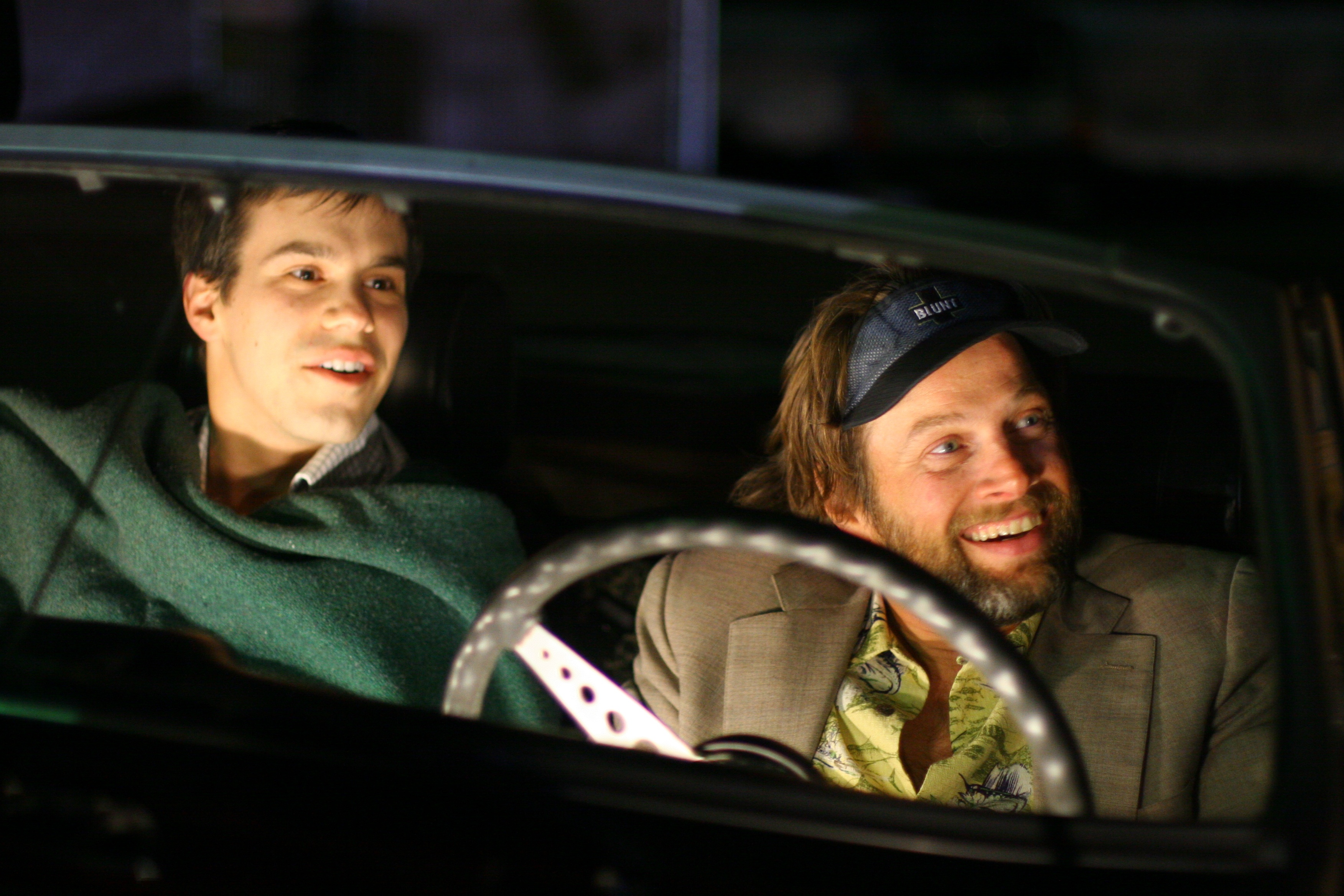
Michael Shulman (left) and James Le Gros on the set of Sherman's Way.

He is the first actor to appear on TV as Deputy United States Marshal Raylan Givens in the TV film Pronto, based on a book by Elmore Leonard. Le Gros also appeared on the TV series Justified (which centers on Givens) as antagonist Wade Messer.

== Personal life ==
Le Gros married actress and photographer Kristina Loggia, daughter of actor Robert Loggia, in 1992. They have two sons; their son Noah LeGros is also an actor.

== Filmography ==
=== Film ===
Year	Title	Role	Notes
1986	The Ladies Club	Jesse	Film debut
1986	Solarbabies	Metron	
1987	Near Dark	Teenage Cowboy	
1987	Real Men	Buddy MacGruder	
1987	Fatal Beauty	Zack Jaeger	
1987	*batteries not included	Goon #2	
1988	Phantasm II	Mike Pearson	
1989	Drugstore Cowboy	Rick	
1989	Born on the Fourth of July	Platoon - Vietnam	
1990	Hollywood Heartbreak	Carl	
1991	Blood and Concrete	Lance	
1991	The Rapture	Tommy	
1991	Point Break	'Roach'	
1992	Where the Day Takes You	'Crasher'	
1992	Nervous Ticks	Rusty	
1992	Leather Jackets	Carl	
1992	My New Gun	Skippy	
1992	Gun Crazy	Howard Hickok	
1992	Singles	Andy	
1994	Floundering	John Boyz	
1994	Bad Girls	William Tucker	
1994	Mrs. Parker and the Vicious Circle	Deems Taylor	
1994	Don't Do It	Dodger	
1995	Living in Oblivion	Chad Palomino	Nominated—Independent Spirit Award for Best Supporting Male
1995	Safe	Chris	
1995	Destiny Turns on the Radio	Harry Thoreau	
1995	Panther	Bob Avakian	
1995	The Low Life	Mike Jr.	
1995	Just Looking	Jim	
1996	The Destiny of Marty Fine	'Grill'	
1996	Boys	Fenton Ray	
1996	Infinity	John Wheeler	
1996	Countdown	Lieutenant Michael Killip	
1997	The Myth of Fingerprints	Cézanne	
1997	Wishful Thinking	Max	
1998	The Pass	Hunter	
1998	Thursday	Billy Hill	
1998	L.A. Without a Map	Takowsky	
1998	There's No Fish Food in Heaven	D.J.	
1998	Enemy of the State	Jerry Miller, Attorney	
1998	Psycho	Car Dealer	
1999	Jump	Bicker	
2000	Drop Back Ten	Peter Barnes	
2000	If You Only Knew	Jack	
2001	Scotland, Pa.	Joe 'Mac' McBeth	
2001	Lovely and Amazing	Paul	
2001	World Traveler	Jack	
2004	November	Hugh	
2004	Straight Into Darkness	Soldier	
2004	Catch That Kid	Ferrell	
2004	Sexual Life	Josh	
2005	Trust the Man	Dante	
2006	The Last Winter	James Hoffman	Nominated—Gotham Independent Film Award for Best Ensemble Cast
2007	Zodiac	Officer George Bawart	
2007	Cough Drop	Paul Dewey	Short film
2008	Vantage Point	Ted Heinkin	
2008	Sherman's Way	Palmer	
2008	Dry Rain	Stil	Short film
2008	Visioneers	Julieen	
2008	Fragments	Dr. Dan Howland	Also known as "Winged Creatures"
2009	Welcome to Academia	Revis	
2010	Skateland	Clive Burkham	
2010	Bitter Feast	Peter Grey	Nominated—Fangoria Chainsaw Award for Best Actor
2012	Big Miracle	Karl Hootkin	
2013	Redwood Highway	Michael Vaughn	
2013	Don't Let Me Go	Chris Madsen	
2013	A Birder's Guide to Everything	Donald Portnoy	
2013	Night Moves	Feed Factory Clerk	
2013	Three Hours Between Planes	Donald Plant	Short film
2014	The Young Kieslowski	Walter Mallard	
2014	Big Muddy	Buford Carver	
2015	Point Break	FBI Deputy Director #2	
2016	Certain Women	Ryan Lewis	
2016	The People Garden	Director	
2016	Stray Bullets	Cody	
2017	Dating My Mother	Chester	
2018	Nostalgia	Patrick Bleam	
2018	Support the Girls	'Cubby'	
2018	Wildling	The Wolf Man	
2018	Unzipping	Tsiki	Short film
2018	Buck Run	William Templeton	
2018	Waterlily Jaguar	Bob	
2019	Phoenix, Oregon	Bobby	
2020	Emperor	Robert E. Lee	
2021	Foxhole	Wilson	
2022	Showing Up	Ira	
2024	Good One	Chris	
2025	Bird In Hand	Dennis	
2025	The Wilderness	Arch	
TBA	Medicine Man	William Rossdale	Post-production

=== Television ===
Year	Title	Role	Notes
1984	Knight Rider	'Trasher'	Television debut Episode: "The Rotten Apples"; credited as James Le Gros
1984	The Ratings Game	Car Attendant	Television Movie; credited as James Legros
1985	Simon & Simon	Punk Boy	Episode: "Slither"
1985	Punky Brewster	'Blade'	2 episodes
1985	CBS Schoolbreak Special	Freddie Cruz	Episode: "Ace Hits the Big Time"
1993	Class of '96	Lucas Miller	Episode: "When Whitney Met Linda"
1996	Roseanne	Mr. Schlosser	Episode: "Springtime for David"
1996	Marshal Law	'Cougar'	Television Movie
1997	The Outer Limits	Ben Conklin	Episode: "Dead Man's Switch"
1997	Pronto	Deputy U.S. Marshal Raylan Givens	Television Movie
1998	ER	Dr. Max Rocher	Recurring role; 3 episodes
1998	L.A. Doctors	Dwight Anthony	Episode: "Under the Radar"
1999	Border Line	Dan MacIvers	Television Movie
2000	Common Ground	Amos	Television Movie
2000–2001	Ally McBeal	Mark Albert	recurring role; 28 episodes Nominated—Screen Actors Guild Award for Outstanding Performance by an Ensemble in a Comedy Series
2002	Friends	Jim Nelson	Episode: "The One with the Tea Leaves"
2002	Big Shot: Confessions of a Campus Bookie	Troy	Television Movie
2002	Damaged Love	Doug Peeno	Television Movie
2003	The Street Lawyer	Barry Nuzzo	Television Movie
2004	Paradise	Matthew Paradise	Television Movie
2005	Law & Order	Dwight Jacobs	Episode: "Red Ball"
2005	Sleeper Cell	Special Agent Ray Fuller	recurring role; 7 episodes
2008	1%	Rabbi	Television Movie
2009–2010	Mercy	Dr. Dan Harris	recurring role; 22 episodes
2010	Law & Order: Special Victims Unit	Bill Harris	Episode: "Behave"
2011	Mildred Pierce	Wally Burgan	Television Miniseries; 5 episodes
2011–2014	Justified	Wade Messer	recurring role; 6 episodes
2012	Grey's Anatomy	Jerry	Episode: "Flight"
2012	House M.D.	Oliver	Episode: "Everybody Dies"
2012	Girls	Jeff Lavoyt	recurring role; 4 episodes
2013	Revenge	Father Paul Whitley	recurring role; 3 episodes
2013	The Good Wife	Judge Adam Tolkin	Episode: "The Next Month"
2013	The Sixth Gun	Bill John O'Henry	Television Movie
2014	Constantine	Ellis McGee	Episode: "The Darkness Beneath"
2014–2016	Person of Interest	Bruce Moran	recurring role; 3 episodes
2015	Battle Creek	Mitchell Ford	Episode: "Stockholm"
2016	Billions	Henchman	Episode: "Boasts and Rails"
2017	Fear the Walking Dead	Eddie	Episode: "Things Bad Begun"
2018–2021	Blue Bloods	Don Voorhees	3 episodes
2018	Castle Rock	Sheriff	Episode: "Harvest"
2019	The Passage	Horace Guilder	5 episodes
2020	Hunters	Hank Grimsby	5 episodes
2020	Love Life	Larry Carter	2 episodes
2021	The Mosquito Coast	Agent Don Voorhees	4 episodes
2025	Severance	Hampton	Episode: "Sweet Vitriol"
