= Brooklyn 45 =

American horror film

- Festival and digital release poster
- Directed by: Ted Geoghegan
- Written by: Ted Geoghegan
- Produced by: Seth Caplan; Pasha Patriki; Sarah Sharp; Michael Paszt; Adam Hendricks
- Starring: Anne Ramsay; Ron E. Rains; Jeremy Holm; Larry Fessenden; Ezra Buzzington; Kristina Klebe
- Cinematography: Robert Patrick Stern
- Edited by: Lisa Hendricks
- Music by: Blitz//Berlin
- Production companies: Shudder; Raven Banner Entertainment; Hangar 18 Media; Divide/Conquer; The Line Film Co.
- Distributed by: Shudder
- Release dates: March 12, 2023 (SXSW); June 9, 2023 (Shudder)
- Running time: 92 minutes
- Country: United States
- Language: English

Brooklyn 45 is a 2023 American real-time supernatural thriller film written and directed by Ted Geoghegan about a group of military veterans holding an impromptu séance in the parlor of a Brooklyn brownstone at the close of World War II. Geoghegan penned the screenplay with assistance from his late father, a disabled Air Force veteran-turned-history teacher.

== Plot ==
On the evening of December 27, 1945, military veterans and lifelong friends Marla Sheridan, Archibald "Archie" Stanton, and Paul DiFranco gather for cocktails at the Park Slope, New York home of their close friend and commander Clive "Hock" Hockstatter. Joining them is Marla's husband Bob, a meek Pentagon clerk whom the others look down on for never having seen battle, but who won Marla's heart for not being as brash and violent as other men.

Hock is mourning the recent suicide of his mentally ill wife Susan, who killed herself when no one would believe her accusations that her German neighbor was a spy for Hitler. Hock deeply regrets not believing his wife and informs his friends that, after losing his faith in organized religion, he began studying spiritualism. He now hopes to connect with the other side in a last-ditch attempt to contact his deceased partner, and convinces his friends to take part in an impromptu séance.

The séance proves successful, with candles lighting themselves, a closet door banging, and the appearance of Susan's ectoplasmic arm as the parlor's radio spontaneously blasts Louis Jordan's "Is You Is or Is You Ain't My Baby." Hock, desperate to touch her, lets go of his friends' hands and reaches for Susan's arm, breaking the circle and sending her ghost receding back into the table. Humbled and overwhelmed by the realization that there really is an afterlife and he could one day reunite with his wife, Hock pulls a pistol from under the table and fatally shoots himself in the head.

At that moment, the closet door bursts open and a woman falls from it, bound and gagged. She breaks free from her restraints, revealing she is Hock's German neighbor, Hildegard, and that he drugged and kidnapped her the night before. She tries to open the locked parlor door, but Paul insists that the group confirm if she is or is not a Nazi spy before anyone leaves. The group bickers, repeatedly changing allegiances as they attempt to uncover the truth about the stranger. In the process, Archie reveals that he's actually committed a war crime that the media is blaming him for while Marla interrogates Hildy using a torturous method, revealing her own hidden brutality to her surprised husband.

Upon discovering that they are trapped supernaturally in the room, Marla decides the only way to leave is by finishing the séance. Hock's corpse, now possessed by his own angry spirit, demands they kill Hildegard before he will let them leave. The séance conjures the full ghost of Susan into the parlor, who accuses Hildegard of killing her and staging it to look like a suicide. Archie panics and attempts to leave, only to find the parlor doors leading to his own personal Hell: the charred remains of the German kindergarten that he is being tried for destroying.

Hock sits up, screaming at the group to kill Hildegard and becoming so enraged that he begins slamming his face against the table, violently breaking his jaw from his face. Bob, who has come into the possession of Hock's pistol, fires twice at Paul after being threatened, first blowing off two of his fingers and then killing him. A relieved Hildegard goes to thank Bob when he turns and fires a single shot into her face, killing her as well. Panicking, Bob drops the gun, claiming he "had to" kill the woman regardless of her actual guilt, lest they never would have been allowed to leave the room.

With Hock's demands fulfilled, the parlor doors open. Bob, Marla, and Archie leave the apartment, where Archie informs them that he is going to turn himself in for what he's done. Archie then asks Bob, who has been deeply critical of Archie's actions, if he's also going to answer for his crimes. Marla and Bob get into their car, but are so overwhelmed by what has happened, they sit in silence, eventually breaking down sobbing.

== Cast ==
- Anne Ramsay as Marla Sheridan
- Ron E. Rains as Bob Sheridan
- Jeremy Holm as Mjr. Archibald Stanton
- Larry Fessenden as Lt. Col. Clive Hockstatter
- Ezra Buzzington as Mjr. Paul DiFranco
- Kristina Klebe as Hildegard Baumann
- Lucy Carapetyan as Susan Hockstatter

== Production ==
After the popularity of a short séance sequence in his 2015 film We Are Still Here, writer-director Geoghegan began toying with the idea of crafting an entire film around a séance. Reaching out to his late father, a quadriplegic Air Force veteran who became a U.S. History teacher, the filmmaker spent several months detailing the plot with his parent, ensuring that it was both historically and militarily accurate. The screenplay was completed in January 2019, with the elder Geoghegan passing away very shortly after.

The film was produced by Shudder, as part of a slate of "Shudder Originals" to debut exclusively on the streaming service.

The film was shot on a soundstage outside of Chicago, Illinois. Over one hundred antique photos, which adorn the walls of the parlor, were donated by friends and family after the filmmaker reached out on social media.

== Release ==
Brooklyn 45 had its world premiere at South by Southwest on March 12, 2023. It was released on the AMC Networks streaming service Shudder on June 9, 2023.

== Reception ==
On the review aggregator website Rotten Tomatoes, 90% of 70 critics' reviews are positive, with an average rating of 7.2/10. The website's consensus reads: "Although its story can feel circuitous and a bit baggy, Brooklyn 45's character driven period horror is elevated by some excellent performances." Metacritic, which uses a weighted average, assigned the film a score of 69 out of 100, based on 11 critics, indicating "generally favorable" reviews.

Brooklyn 45 was positively received at its world premiere. Bloody Disgusting called the cast "tremendous" while Screen Anarchy called it "a stunning film that is sure to win over fans who go in with open minds."

Upon the film's wide release, Anne Ramsay's performance was called "extraordinary" by The Wall Street Journal, with critic John Anderson noting her "remarkably natural acting under unnatural conditions" in his positive review. Noel Murray called it "well-made pulp" in his positive Los Angeles Times review, and that "writer-director Ted Geoghegan packs in plenty of plot and gives an excellent cast some flavorful dialogue and rich characters to play."

Actor and filmmaker Larry Fessenden's performance as Clive Hockstatter was also repeatedly praised, with Issac Feldberg of RogerEbert.com stating, "'Larry Fessenden hosting a séance' is a can’t-lose proposition, but BROOKLYN 45 is smart to grant him a monologue at the end of the first act that’s explosive in its grief and anguish. It’s exhilarating to watch an often underutilized character actor so strong at center stage."

Critic Jeannette Catsoulis gave the film a mixed review for The New York Times, calling it "overlong" and "repetitive", but also, "an ambitious period piece given an appropriately vintage look by the cinematographer Robert Patrick Stern." Furthermore, she praised the ensemble cast for "convincingly turning unappetizing characters into broken people trying to move on from a war that keeps pulling them back in."
