= Eater (Fear Itself) =

- Fear Itself episode
- Episode no.: Season 1 Episode 5
- Directed by: Stuart Gordon
- Written by: Richard Chizmar; Johnathon Schaech; Peter Crowther (short story)
- Original air date: July 3, 2008

Guest appearances
- Elisabeth Moss; Pablo Schreiber; Stephen Lee; Russell Hornsby; Stephen R. Hart

Episode chronology
← Previous "In Sickness and In Health"	Next → "New Year's Day"

"Eater" is the fifth episode of the NBC horror anthology Fear Itself and is based on the Peter Crowther short story of the same name. This episode ended up being director Stuart Gordon's final work before his death in 2020.

== Plot ==
Newly recruited police officer Danny Bannerman is assigned to be part of a detail guarding Duane Mellor, a Cajun serial killer and cannibal nicknamed "Eater", who is known for torturing, butchering, and eating his victims alive. As the night wears on, she begins to recognize that her all-male colleagues' behavior is getting stranger by the minute, and they are being killed one by one. Bannerman later finds out that the "Eater" has been using black magic all along and that he was hoping to use it on her to make her free him, and then kill her afterwards.

He gets his wish by having stolen Bannerman's keys in an earlier confrontation between the two and he begins to hunt for Bannerman. Meanwhile, Bannerman is on the run and tries to look for an exit but they are all locked or blocked off. Instead she devises a plan, and, while hiding from Mellor in a broom closet, she ingests rat poison and calls out to Mellor. The two fight and she manages to handcuff the killer. The enraged Mellor begins eating Bannerman only to end up poisoning himself at the same time, crying out in a fit of rage as he slowly dies inches away from Bannerman's lifeless body.

== Cast ==
- Elisabeth Moss as Officer Danny Bannerman, a "boot"
- Stephen R. Hart as Duane "Eater" Mellor, a cannibalistic serial killer who gets his nickname due to his method of his crimes.
- Russell Hornsby as Sergeant Williams
- Pablo Schreiber as Mattingley
- Stephen Lee (actor) as Marty Steinwitz

== Reception ==
Critical reception for the episode was generally positive. The A.V. Club rated the episode an A−, crediting "Eater" as "easily the strongest episode to date and the only one that actually scared me at moments." Bloody Disgusting and Den of Geek both credited Stuart Gordon's directing as a boon to the episode, which they felt was lacking at times.

IGN's Matt Fowler was more critical, criticizing the series for having too many episodes that failed to maintain suspension of disbelief and also stating that "all of the juvenile behavior from the cops during the story was completely inane and did nothing except prevent me from becoming the least bit interested in this episode".
