= Jeff Shannon =

American film critic (1961–2013)

- Born: Jeffrey Alan Shannon; July 15, 1961; Seattle, Washington, U.S.
- Died: December 20, 2013 (aged 52); Snohomish County, Washington, U.S.
- Occupations: Journalist film critic
- Known for: Disability activism

Jeffrey Alan Shannon (July 15, 1961 – December 20, 2013) was an American film critic, born and based in Seattle. He was best known for his work with the Seattle Post-Intelligencer (1985–92) and The Seattle Times (1992–2013).

Shannon studied film history, theory and criticism at Wright State University in Dayton, Ohio. He was the assistant editor of Microsoft Cinemania CD-ROM and website movie encyclopedia (1992–98), and the original DVD section editor in the Home Video department of Amazon.com (1998–2001). He also contributed video-on-demand reviews for the late Roger Ebert's website (2011–13)

He was injured on the island of Maui in 1979 two weeks after graduating from high school, leaving him with a C-5/6 quadriplegia. In addition to writing occasional articles for New Mobility magazine, he served two three-year terms on the Washington State Governor's Committee on Disability Issues and Employment (2005–11). He also wrote a column, "From Where I'm Sitting", for FacingDisability.com.

Shannon died of pneumonia on December 20, 2013.
