= Habit (1995 film) =

- Directed by: Larry Fessenden
- Written by: Larry Fessenden
- Produced by: Dayton Taylor; Robin O'Hara
- Starring: Larry Fessenden; Meredith Snaider
- Cinematography: Frank G. DeMarco
- Edited by: Larry Fessenden
- Music by: Geoffrey Kidde
- Production company: Glass Eye Pix
- Distributed by: Glass Eye Pix
- Release dates: October 15, 1995 (Chicago International Film Festival); November 14, 1997 (United States)
- Running time: 112 minutes
- Country: United States
- Language: English
- Budget: $200,000

Habit is a 1995 vampire horror film starring Larry Fessenden, who also wrote and directed the film.

== Plot ==
Sam is a self-destructive, vaguely artistic New York bohemian who has recently lost his father and his long-time girlfriend. At a Halloween party he meets a mysterious, beautiful, androgynous woman named Anna (Meredith Snaider). He embarks on a kinky, sex-charged relationship with her; but soon he develops a mysterious illness, and eventually comes to believe that Anna is a vampire.

== Cast ==
- Larry Fessenden as Sam
- Meredith Snaider as Anna
- Aaron Beall as Nick
- Patricia Coleman as Rae
- Heather Woodbury as Liza
- Jesse Hartman as Lenny
- Kelly Reichardt as Partygirl on Phone

== Production ==
Habit was based on a short film by the same name, also by Fessenden, which he created in 1981 as a film student in New York University. Filming took place in New York City during 1994. The film was shot on 16mm film and on a budget of approximately $60,000. According to Lost Reels, Fessenden did not have filming permits for all of his scenes.

Of the film, Fessenden has stated that he wanted to make "the scariest movie since Night of the Living Dead" and that "in a strange, perverse way I succeeded - not in making a scary movie, but in making one that was perverse beyond my dreams."

== Release ==
Habit premiered at the Chicago International Film Festival on October 15, 1995. It went on to screen at several film festivals and was released on to VHS and DVD. Vinegar Syndrome has released the movie both as a solitary release as well as part of a two-pack with Fessenden's film No Telling.

In 2022 Habit was screened at the Museum of Modern Art in New York City, New York as part of a retrospective of both Fessenden's career and his production company, Glass Eye Pix. That same year it was also screened in the United Kingdom through the organization Lost Reels, which stated that it was the movie's United Kingdom premiere.

== Awards ==
Award	Category	Nominee	Result
Austin Film Festival	Feature Film Award	Larry Fessenden	Nominated
Independent Spirit Awards	Producers Award	Robin O'Hara	Won
Independent Spirit Awards	Best Cinematography	Frank G. DeMarco	Nominated
Independent Spirit Awards	Best Director	Larry Fessenden	Nominated
Independent Spirit Awards	Someone to Watch Award	Larry Fessenden	Won
Williamsburg Brooklyn Film Festival	Feature Film	Larry Fessenden	Won
Williamsburg Brooklyn Film Festival	Best Actor	Larry Fessenden	Nominated
Williamsburg Brooklyn Film Festival	Best Editing	Larry Fessenden	Nominated
