= Larry Fessenden =

American actor and filmmaker

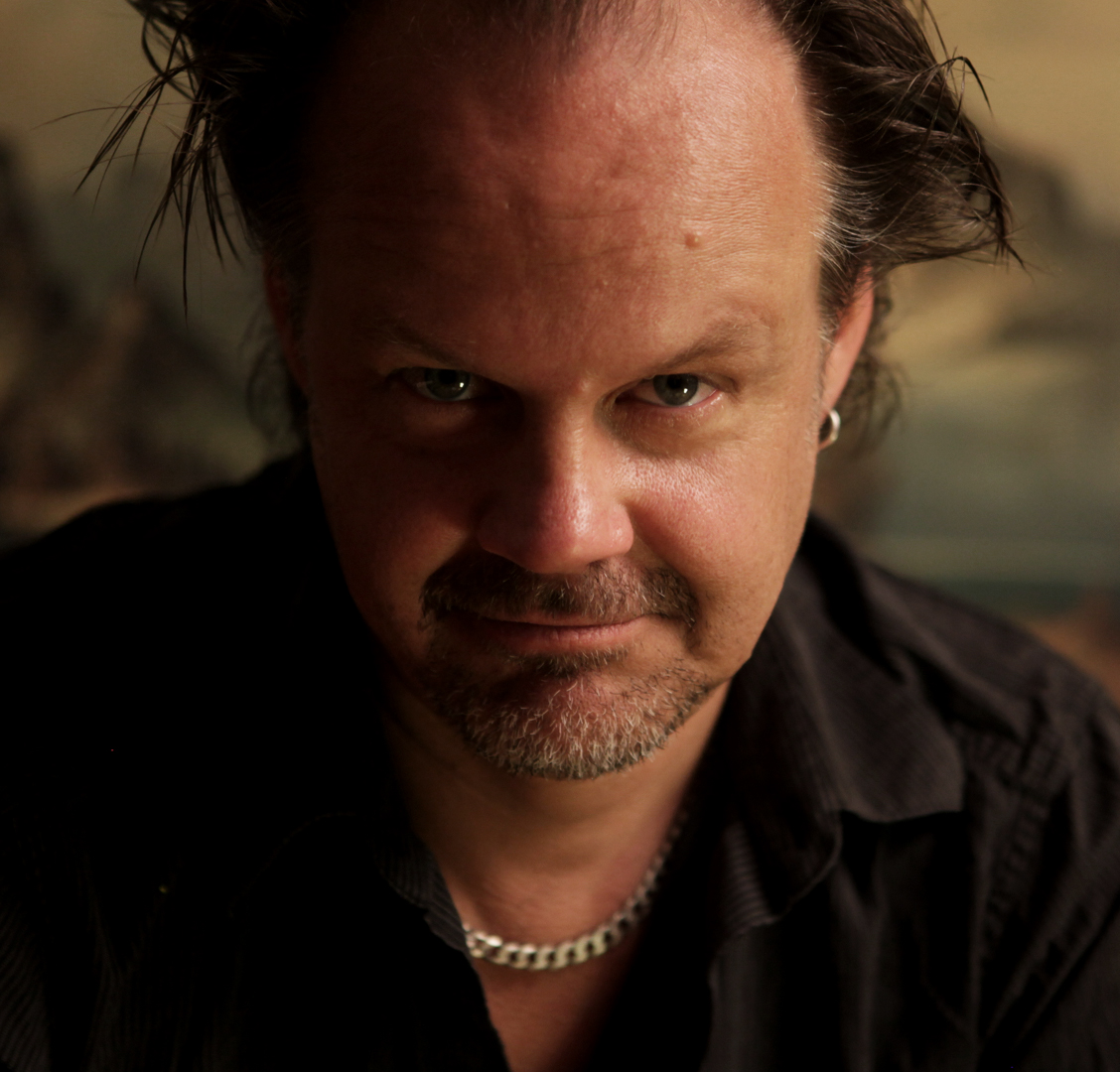
- Fessenden in 2010
- Born: Laurence T. Fessenden; March 23, 1963 (age 63); New York, New York City, U.S.
- Occupations: Actor; producer; screenwriter; director; film editor; cinematographer
- Years active: 1978–present
- Spouse: Beck Underwood
- Children: 1

Laurence T. Fessenden (born March 23, 1963) is an American actor and filmmaker. He is the founder of the New York-based independent film production company Glass Eye Pix. His writer/director credits include No Telling (written with Beck Underwood, 1991), Habit (1997), Wendigo (2001), and The Last Winter (written with Robert Leaver, 2006), which is in the permanent collection of the Museum of Modern Art. He has also directed the television feature Beneath (2013), an episode of the NBC TV series Fear Itself (2008) entitled "Skin and Bones", and a segment of the anthology horror-comedy film The ABCs of Death 2 (2014). He is the writer, with Graham Reznick, of the BAFTA Award-winning Sony PlayStation video game Until Dawn. Films he has acted in include Bringing Out the Dead (1999), Broken Flowers (2005), I Sell the Dead (2009), Jug Face (2012), We Are Still Here (2015), In a Valley of Violence (2016), Like Me (2017), and The Dead Don't Die (2019), Brooklyn 45 (2023), and Killers of the Flower Moon (2023).

== Early life ==
Fessenden was born in New York City. He attended St. Bernard's School, then Phillips Academy, from which he was expelled.

== Career ==
Fessenden regards the old Universal Monsters as a substantial influence for him. As an actor, screenwriter, director and film editor, he has worked, in addition to feature films, on such television projects as the NBC horror anthology Fear Itself (2008), directing the episode "Skin and Bones". He wrote the screenplay of Orphanage (2007) with Guillermo del Toro, an English-language remake of El Orfanato.

Fessenden has worked as a mentor to young directors, such as Jim Mickle and Ti West. He has been a producer on projects including Ilya Chaiken's Liberty Kid (2007), Kelly Reichardt's Wendy and Lucy (2008), James McKenney's Satan Hates You (2010), West's The House of the Devil (2009) and The Innkeepers (2011), Joe Maggio's The Last Rites of Joe May (2011), and Rick Alverson's The Comedy (2012). Under his low-budget horror banner ScareFlix, Fessenden has produced films including West's The Roost (2005) and Trigger Man (2007), Glenn McQuaid's I Sell the Dead (2008), Maggio's Bitter Feast (2010), and Mickle's Stake Land (2010). More recently he has produced for prolific horror auteur Mickey Keating with Darling (2015) and Psychopaths (2017).

As a character actor, Fessenden has appeared in numerous films, including Martin Scorsese's Killers of the Flower Moon (2023), and Bringing Out the Dead (1999), Ti West's X (uncredited) and MaXXXine (2024), Steve Buscemi's Animal Factory (2000), Brad Anderson's Session 9 (2001) and Vanishing on 7th Street (2010), Jim Jarmusch's The Dead Don't Die (2019) and Broken Flowers (2005), Neil Jordan's The Brave One (2007), McQuaid's I Sell the Dead (2008) for which he won best actor at the Slamdance Film Festival; Reichardt's Wendy and Lucy (2008), Mickle's Mulberry Street (2006) and Stake Land (2010), Joe Swanberg's All the Light in the Sky (2011), and Ted Geoghegan's We Are Still Here and Brooklyn 45 (2023). Fessenden also starred in the Sundance Film Festival picture River of Grass (1994), which was Reichardt's debut feature, and Margarita Happy Hour (2001) directed by Chaiken. He has appeared on television in Louie, The Strain, and as himself in National Geographic's Brain Games.

In 2010, Fessenden partnered with Glenn McQuaid to launch Tales from Beyond the Pale, a series of macabre audio dramas now available as a 47 episode podcast. In 2011, he released his third rock album with the band Just Desserts, an on-going partnership with songwriter Tom Laverack. In 2012, he executive produced and was interviewed in the documentary Birth of the Living Dead, which examines the legacy of Night of the Living Dead. In 2016, he produced, acted, and served as cinematographer in his son Jack's feature debut, Stray Bullets. The same year also saw Fessenden release a book titled Sudden Storm, A Wendigo Reader.

Fessenden has also established a strong presence in the video game world. In 2015, he and Graham Reznick collaborated on writing the video game Until Dawn. Fessenden also played the role of a mysterious stranger armed with a flamethrower in the game itself. The game earned positive reviews and would go on to receive the "Original Property" award in the 2016 BAFTA Games Awards. Fessenden and Reznick also set a Guinness World Record for "Longest script for a graphic adventure videogame," with their script reaching 1,000 pages. The two writers would team up again in 2016 to develop a spin-off game known as Until Dawn: Rush of Blood, and later in 2018 for the Until Dawn prequel, The Inpatient.

Fessenden has run the company Glass Eye Pix since 1985 with the mission of "supporting individual voices in the arts." Glass Eye Pix continues to nurture young talent, most recently producing the debut features of Robert Mocker (Like Me, starring Addison Timlin and Fessenden), Ana Asensio (Most Beautiful Island), and Jenn Wexler (The Ranger).

Fessenden's Frankenstein-themed feature, Depraved, which he wrote, directed, edited and produced, was released on Friday the 13th of September, 2019 through IFC Midnight.

His werewolf film Blackout premiered at the 27th International Fantasia Film Festival in July 2023.

Fessenden's next feature, Trauma or, Monsters All, brings together characters from three of his earlier films: Habit, Depraved, and Blackout. The film had its world premiere at the Overlook Film Festival in April 2026 and subsequently screened at the Fantasia International Film Festival and FrightFest.

== Filmography ==
=== Short film ===
Year	Title	Director	Writer	Notes
1978	Jaws	Yes	No	
1979	The Eliminator	Yes	Yes	
1980	White Trash	Yes	Yes	
1980	The Field	Yes	Yes	
1981	Lifeline	Yes	Yes	
1989	Stunt: A Musical Motion Picture	Yes	No	
2008	Santa Claws	No	Yes	
2014	Frankenstein Cannot Be Stopped	Yes	No	Video short
2014	N is for Nexus	Yes	No	Segment of ABCs of Death 2

Documentary short

- Chinatown (1986)
- Mismatch (1987)
- Searching for the Wendigo (2002)

Acting roles

Year	Title	Role	Notes
1980	White Trash	Man Who Looks Through Trash	
1981	Lifeline	Man	
2002	Bad Day for a Tow	Tow Guy	
2005	The Resurrection Apprentice	Willy Grimes	
2006	The Pod	Telly	
2007	The Hunter	Kenny	
2009	Blood Red Earth	Cowboy	
2012	Wolf Dog Tales	Wolf Dog	Video short; Voice only

=== Feature film ===
Year	Title	Director	Writer	Producer	Notes
1981	A Face in the Crowd	Yes	Yes	No	
1982	Habit	Yes	Yes	No	Video
1985	Experienced Movers	Yes	No	No	
1989	Hollow Venus: Diary of a Go-Go Dancer	Yes	Yes	No	
1991	No Telling	Yes	Yes	No	
1997	Habit	Yes	Yes	No	
2001	Wendigo	Yes	Yes	No	
2006	The Last Winter	Yes	Yes	Yes	
2013	Beneath	Yes	No	Yes	
2019	Depraved	Yes	Yes	Yes	
2023	Blackout	Yes	Yes	Yes	
2023	Crumb Catcher	No	Story	Yes	
2026	Trauma or, Monsters All	Yes	Yes	Yes	

Producer

- River of Grass (1994) (Associate Producer)
- Wendy and Lucy (2008)
- I Sell the Dead (2008)
- The House of the Devil (2009)
- Bitter Feast (2010)
- Satan Hates You (2010)
- Stake Land (2010)
- Hypothermia (2010)
- The Innkeepers (2011)
- Late Phases (2014)
- Callback (2016) (Co-Producer)
- Stray Bullets (2016)
- The Stakelander (2016)
- Foxhole (2019)

Executive producer

- The Off Season (2004)
- The Roost (2005)
- Automatons (2006)
- Trigger Man (2007)
- I Can See You (2008)
- Darling (2015)
- Certain Women (2016)

Acting roles

Year	Title	Credit	Notes
1981	A Face in the Crowd	Narrator	Voice only
1982	Habit	Sam	Video
1991	No Telling	Eden Ridge Employee	
1994	River of Grass	Lee Ray Harold	
1997	Habit	Sam	
1999	Bringing Out the Dead	Cokehead	
2000	Hamlet	Kissing Man	
2000	Animal Factory	Benny	
2001	Session 9	Craig McManus	
2002	Happy Here and Now	Clifton	
2003	Family Portraits: A Trilogy of America	Jimmy Doyle	
2004	Imaginary Heroes	Store Clerk	
2004	The Off Season	Phil	
2005	The Roost	Tow Truck Driver	
2005	Broken Flowers	Will	
2005	Headspace	Father	
2006	Automatons	Enemy Guard	
2006	The Last Winter	Charles Foster	
2006	Mulberry St	Man Behind Gate	
2007	Trigger Man	Henchman	
2007	The Brave One	Sandy Combs	
2008	I Can See You	Mickey Hauser	
2008	Wendy and Lucy	Man in Park	
2008	I Sell The Dead	Willy Grimes	
2009	Cabin Fever 2: Spring Fever	Bill	
2010	Hypothermia	Fishing Host	
2010	Bitter Feast	William Coley	
2010	Satan Hates You	Glumac	
2010	Vanishing on 7th Street	Bike Messenger	
2010	Stake Land	Roadhouse Bartender	
2011	You're Next	Erik Harson	
2011	Silver Bullets	Sam	
2012	Hellbenders	Detective Elrod	
2012	Wolf Dog	Wolf Dog	
2012	All the Light in the Sky	Rusty	
2012	Jug Face	Sustin	
2013	Ritual	Motel Clerk	
2013	We Are What We Are	Bearded Tenant	
2014	Late Phases	O'Brien	
2014	Worst Friends	Jerry	
2015	Pod	Smith	
2015	Body	Arthur	
2015	We Are Still Here	Jacob Lewis	
2015	The Mind's Eye	Mike Connors	
2015	Southbound	The D.J.	Voice Only
2015	Darling	Officer Maneretti	
2016	Carnage Park	Travis	
2016	In a Valley of Violence	Roy	
2016	Callback	Joe	
2016	The Transfiguration	Drunk Man	
2016	Good Funk	Kevin	
2016	No Way to Live	Jerry	
2016	Stray Bullets	Charlie	
2016	The Stakelander	Biggs	
2017	Girlfriend's Day	Taft	
2017	Like Me	Marshall	
2017	Small Crimes	Earl	
2017	Most Beautiful Island	Rudy	
2017	Psychopaths	Henry Earl Starkweather	
2018	Clara's Ghost	Fan Man/Man In Bar	
2018	The Ranger	Uncle Pete	
2018	Sadistic Intentions	Father	
2019	Depraved	Ratso	
2019	The Dead Don't Die	Danny Perkins	
2019	Dementer	Larry	
2020	Cold Wind Blowing	The Wolf	
2021	Jakob's Wife	Pastor Jakob Fedder	
2021	Dashcam	Lieberman	
2021	The Spine of Night	Prophet of Doom	
2022	Offseason	H. Grierson	
2022	X	Howard	Voice only; Uncredited
2023	Brooklyn 45	Clive "Hock" Hockstatter	
2023	Killers of the Flower Moon	Radio Actor (William Hale)	
2024	MaXXXine	Security Guard	
2025	Good Boy	Todd's grandfather	
2025	Blood Shine	Leader	
2026	Trauma or, Monsters All	Sam	

=== Television ===
Director

Year	Title	Episode
2008	Fear Itself	"Skin and Bones"

Acting roles

Year	Title	Role	Episode
2001	Third Watch	Ruby Granger	"A Hero's Rest"
2006	Law & Order: Criminal Intent	Boaz	"Diamond Dogs"
2014	Louie	Upset Man	"Elevator: Part 6"
2014	The Strain	Jack Noon	"Runaways"

=== Video game ===
Writer

- Until Dawn (2015)
- Until Dawn: Rush of Blood (2016)
- Hidden Agenda (2017)
- The Inpatient (2018)
- The Dark Pictures Anthology: Man of Medan (2018)

Acting roles

Year	Title	Roles	Notes
2015	Until Dawn	Stranger	Voice and likeness
2016	Until Dawn: Rush of Blood	Dan T	
2017	Hidden Agenda	Vernon LeMay	

== Awards and honors ==
=== Awards ===
- Won – 1997 Independent Spirit Award Someone to Watch Award (Habit)
- Nominated – 1997 Independent Spirit Award for Best Director (Habit)
- Nominated – 1997 Austin Film Festival Award for Best Feature Film (Habit)
- Won – 1999 Williamsburg Brooklyn Film Festival Audience Award for Feature Film (Habit)
- Won – 1999 Williamsburg Brooklyn Film Festival Award for Best Editing (Habit)
- Won – 1999 Williamsburg Brooklyn Film Festival Award for Best Actor (Habit)
- Won – 2001 Woodstock Film Festival Jury Prize for Best Feature Film (Wendigo)
- Nominated – 2003 Fangoria Chainsaw Award for Best Screenplay (Wendigo)
- Won – 2007 Sitges Film Festival Maria Honorary Award (Himself)
- Nominated – 2009 Independent Spirit Award for Best Feature Film (Wendy and Lucy)
- Won – 2009 AFI Award for Movie of the Year (Wendy and Lucy)
- Nominated – 2010 Piaget Spirit Award for Producing (Himself)
- Won – 2010 Slamdance Special Jury Mention for Best Performance (I Sell the Dead)
- Nominated – 2010 Independent Spirit Award Producers Award (I Sell the Dead and The House of the Devil)
- Won – 2011 Chlotrudis Award for Career So Far (Himself)
- Nominated – 2014 Chicago International Film Festival Audience Choice Award (The ABCs of Death 2)
- Nominated – 2015 Fright Meter Award for Best Supporting Actor (We Are Still Here)
- Nominated – 2016 Fangoria Chainsaw Award for Best Supporting Actor (We Are Still Here)
- Won – 2016 BAFTA Games Award for Original Property (Until Dawn)
- Won – 2017 Develop Award for Best Performance (Until Dawn: Rush of Blood)

=== Honors ===
- 2011 – Inducted into the Fangoria Hall of Fame
- 2011 – Total Film Icon of Horror at the London FrightFest Film Festival
- 2024 – Brooklyn Horror Film Festival Leviathan Award

== See also ==
- Antidote Films
- Jeff Levy-Hinte
