= Like Me (film) =

- Film poster
- Directed by: Robert Mockler
- Written by: Robert Mockler
- Produced by: Jessalyn Abbott; James Belfer; Robert Mockler; Jenn Wexler
- Starring: Addison Timlin; Ian Nelson; Larry Fessenden; Jeremy Gardner
- Cinematography: James Siewert
- Edited by: Jessalyn Abbott; Robert Mockler
- Music by: Giona Ostinelli
- Production companies: Dogfish Pictures; Glass Eye Pix; Go Infect Films; Lankn Partners
- Distributed by: Kino Lorber
- Release date: March 10, 2017 (SXSW)
- Running time: 80 minutes
- Country: United States
- Language: English

Like Me is a 2017 American psychological horror-thriller film written and directed by Robert Mockler. It stars Addison Timlin as a loner on a crime spree that she broadcasts on social media. The film had its world premiere at the South by Southwest Film Festival on March 10, 2017.

== Cast ==
- Addison Timlin as Kiya
- Ian Nelson as Burt
- Larry Fessenden as Marshall
- Jeremy Gardner as Freddie
- Nicolette Pierini as Julia
- Ana Asensio as Anna
- Suyash Pachauri as OTT
- Shawn C. Phillips as a Reactor

== Reception ==
On the review aggregator website Rotten Tomatoes, 69% of 29 critics' reviews are positive. The website's consensus reads: "Like Me stylishly explores some interesting ideas, even if they're too often consigned to the background in favor of more ordinary violence and gore." On Metacritic, the film has a weighted average score of 60 out of 100 based on 11 critics, which the site labels as "mixed or average" reviews.
