= Stray Bullets (film) =

- Directed by: Jack Fessenden
- Written by: Jack Fessenden
- Produced by: Larry Fessenden; Jack Fessenden; Beck Underwood
- Starring: Asa Spurlock; Jack Fessenden; James LeGros; John Speredakos; Larry Fessenden; Robert Burke Warren; Erik Kraus; Roger Peltzman; Kevin Corrigan
- Cinematography: Larry Fessenden
- Edited by: Jack Fessenden
- Music by: Jack Fessenden
- Production company: Fessypix
- Distributed by: Screen Media Films
- Release dates: September 16, 2016 (OIFF); February 10, 2017 (US)
- Running time: 83 minutes
- Country: United States
- Language: English

Stray Bullets is a 2016 American thriller film written, directed, edited, and composed by Jack Fessenden. Fessenden also produced it with his parents, Larry Fessenden and Beck Underwood. The film stars Jack Fessenden and Asa Spurlock as two teenagers who encounter, and are kidnapped by, mobsters played by James LeGros, Larry Fessenden, and John Speredakos. It premiered at the Oldenburg International Film Festival on September 16, 2016, and was released in the US on February 10, 2017.

== Premise ==
Two bored teenagers are taken hostage by mobsters fleeing a botched job and a hitman.

== Cast ==
- Asa Spurlock as Ash
- Jack Fessenden as Connor
- James LeGros as Cody
- John Speredakos as Dutch
- Larry Fessenden as Charlie
- Robert Burke Warren as J. T.
- Erik Kraus as Paul
- Roger Peltzman as Kauffman
- Kevin Corrigan as Nick
- Cally Mansfield as Emma
- Fenner Micheline as Sam
- Steve Heller as Richie

== Production ==
Shooting began when Jack Fessenden was 15 years old and completed when he was 16, taking 16 days.

== Release ==
Stray Bullets premiered at the Oldenburg International Film Festival on September 16, 2016. Screen Media Films gave it a limited release and via video on demand on February 10, 2017.

== Reception ==
Rotten Tomatoes, a review aggregator, reports that 75% of eight surveyed critics gave the film a positive review; the average rating is 6.2/10. Metacritic rated it 55/100 based on five reviews. Dennis Harvey of Variety wrote that it "feels a couple story beats short of a satisfying whole, [but] it's admirably well-crafted within its mostly savvy limitations". Harvey criticized the film for not being fleshed out enough beyond its beginnings as a short film but said this "feels like more of a minor letdown than a major failing" due to the technical proficiency, praising Jack Fessenden's potential as a director. Neil Young of The Hollywood Reporter called it "a strikingly impressive calling-card", though he said Jack Fessenden's acting is weaker than his directing and musicianship. Writing in The New York Times, Ken Jaworowski said that the film feels padded to feature length and has a cheesy ending. He concluded that Fessenden has "more than a little raw skill" and should be encouraged despite the film's shortcomings. Noel Murray of the Los Angeles Times wrote, "there's a confidence and energy to Stray Bullets that compensates for the rather rudimentary, over-familiar story".
