= Depraved =

2019 American horror film

- Film poster
- Directed by: Larry Fessenden
- Written by: Larry Fessenden
- Produced by: Larry Fessenden; Chadd Harbold; Jenn Wexler
- Starring: David Call; Joshua Leonard; Alex Breaux; Ana Kayne; Maria Dizzia; Chloe Levine; Owen Campbell; Addison Timlin
- Cinematography: James Siewert; Chris Skotchdopole
- Edited by: Larry Fessenden
- Music by: Will Bates
- Production companies: Glass Eye Pix; Forager Films
- Distributed by: IFC Midnight
- Release dates: March 20, 2019 (What The Fest?); September 13, 2019 (United States)
- Running time: 114 minutes
- Country: United States
- Language: English

Depraved is a 2019 American horror film written and directed by Larry Fessenden and starring David Call and Joshua Leonard. It is a modern version of Mary Shelley's Frankenstein.

== Premise ==
Suffering from PTSD following his stint as a United States Army medic, Henry now works feverishly in his Brooklyn laboratory to forget the deaths he witnessed overseas by creating life in the form of a man cobbled together from body parts. After procuring a brain from an unwitting victim, his creation, Adam, is born. But it soon seems that giving life to Adam was the easy part; teaching him how to live in a dark and troubled world may be perilous.

== Plot ==
One night, a man, Alex, and his girlfriend, Lucy, get into an argument after Lucy mentions that Alex would be a good father. He feels it is too soon to talk about such a thing because they only just graduated college and moved in together. Alex decides to spend the night at his old place and leaves. While walking, he is attacked by a masked assailant and stabbed several times.

Alex's brain is transplanted into the creation Adam, who wakes up in the home of Henry, an ex-military field surgeon with untreated PTSD. Henry is pleased to see Adam awake and begins testing his cognitive and motor skills in various ways, using baby toys, table tennis, and Alex's own handball.

Adam has flashes of his previous life and wonders why he has gaps in his memory, such as not remembering being a child.

Henry's girlfriend, Liz, arrives unexpectedly and meets Adam, quickly figuring out what Henry has done based on their prior conversations.

Henry introduces Adam to his close friend, beneficiary and collaborator, Polidori, who is enthusiastic about his results, taking Adam to an art gallery and a strip club and giving him drugs, but, he also concerned about Henry's treatment of Adam and his general mental state and involvement in the project. Polidori and Henry are both very possessive and struggle to share credit for their work.

Adam and Liz have a brief sexual encounter and Adam expresses a desire for his own woman.

Adam remembers more about his past life and confronts Henry before fleeing the house and hiding nearby while Polidori and Henry argue about the project.

Adam follows Henry as he searches the streets for him. Adam enters a bar and meets a woman. They have a few drinks and he walks her home, but grows agitated when they arrive and tries to invite her to play ping pong at his home. She resists and he drags her, eventually asphixiating her. Henry finds them and brings them inside.

Adam begs Henry to bring her back to life. Henry refuses and stabs Adam in the throat, presumably killing him.

In a flashback, Henry finds the original Adam, a fellow soldier, moments from death on a battlefield. He is unable to save him.

In the present, Liz arrives and helps Henry get rid of the bodies and all the remaining parts of Henry's other victims. They bury the remains in the woods, then pay Polidori a visit, interrupting a dinner with his wife and in-laws. Polidori asks Henry what happened to Adam, and Henry claims he hasn't found him.

Polidori tries to arrange a meeting between himself, Henry, and his father-in-law, Mr Beaufort, to discuss their project, but Beaufort isn't convinced, believing it to be purely theoretical. The Beauforts leave.

Polidori is furious that Adam is missing. Polidori's wife, Georgina, confronts Liz about Henry stealing Polidori's work. Henry admits he found Adam and killed him because he killed a woman, and explains they should forget the whole thing ever happened because it was a failure. Polidori admits he tried to turn Henry against Adam by claiming he was dangerous so he could keep Adam to himself.

Henry and Liz reluctantly stay the night at Polidori's. Polidori goads Henry about his failures.

Adam reawakens, finds Polidori's house, and kills Liz. Adam and Henry fight and end up outside. Polidori and Georgina find Liz's body, believing her to have been killed by Henry. Polidori, panckied, shoots Georgina. He then searches the house for Henry to kill him too, but is distracted when he sees Adam is still alive, giving Henry an opening. Henry attacks Polidori, but Polidori shoots him. Henry dies in Adam's arms as Henry apologises.

Polidori taunts Adam about his existence, placing all of the blame for the various deaths on Adam and Henry. He shoots Adam in the chest and Adam collapses. Polidori begins to drive away from the house, which is now ablaze, but Adam punches through the window and jerks the steering wheel, causing Polidori to crash. He drags Polidori from the car and tosses him over a balcony as he begs for his life.

Adam escapes police capture and returns to the museum, where Lucy (Alex's girlfriend) works, to return the necklace she gave Alex the night he disappeared. Lucy is distraught to learn Alex is out there somewhere and attempts to catch up to him before he leaves. She doesn't recognise Adam's face in the crowd.

== Cast ==
- David Call as Henry
- Joshua Leonard as Polidori
- Alex Breaux as Adam
- Ana Kayne as Liz
- Maria Dizzia as Georgina
- Chloe Levine as Lucy
- Owen Campbell as Alex
- Addison Timlin as Shelley
- Chris O'Connor as Mr. Beaufort
- Alice Barrett as Mrs. Beaufort
- Andrew Lasky as Sam the Bartender
- Jack Fessenden as Eddie
- James Tam as Mr. Zhang
- Zilong Zee as Mr. Ling
- Noah Le Gros as Soldier Adam
- John Speredakos as Officer Spano
- Hope Blackstock as Officer Flores
- Stormi Maya as Strip Club Bartender
- Rev Love as Stripper #1
- Hannah Townsend as Stripper #2

== Release ==
Depraved made its worldwide debut on March 20, 2019, at the IFC Center's What The Fest!? Film Festival. On May 13 that same year, it was announced that IFC Midnight acquired American distribution rights to the film. It was released on September 13, 2019 in the United States.

== Reception ==
On review aggregator Rotten Tomatoes, Depraved holds an approval rating of 84% based on 57 reviews, with an average score of 7.1/10. The site's consensus reads: "A thrillingly effective update on a classic story, Depraved jolts a familiar monster back to life with a potent blend of timely themes and old-school chills." On Metacritic, the film has a weighted average score of 69 out of 100, based on 10 critics, indicating "generally positive reviews".

David Ehrlich of IndieWire graded the film a B. Anya Stanley of Dread Central awarded the film three stars out of five. Katie Rife of The A.V. Club awarded the film a B− and found that Fessenden did something interesting with what is "the umpteenth adaptation of a centuries-old classic." Jeannette Catsoulis of The New York Times called it Fessenden's "most coherent and visually polished work to date" while still finding it a little "overlong." TheWrap's William Bibbiani was more critical saying "as a whole it contributes little to the 'Frankenstein' tradition, other than a reminder that this has all been done before, mostly better."
