= Society of Gentlemen =

Society of Gentlemen can refer to:

- A Society of Gentlemen in Scotland, pseudonym of the authors of the Encyclopædia Britannica First Edition
- Spalding Gentlemen's Society, a learned society of the United Kingdom, was founded in 1710
- Society of Gentleman Practisers in the Courts of Law and Equity
- Society of Gentlemen at Exeter

== See also ==
- The Society of Gentlemen Adventurers, episode of Red Panda Adventures
