= HypaSpace =

- Starring: Kim Poirier (2005-2008), Natasha Eloi (2002-2008); Jonathan Llyr (2002-2007) and Danielle McGimsie (2007-2008)
- Country of origin: Canada
- No. of seasons: 7
- No. of episodes: 1480

Production
- Running time: 2 minutes (Daily) (2002-2007)/25 minutes (Weekly)

Original release
- Network: Space
- Release: May 13, 2002 – June 27, 2008

HypaSpace was a weekly entertainment news program about the world of science fiction and fantasy, created by and shown on Space, a former Canadian cable television station, now CTV Sci-Fi Channel. It had daily and weekly segments.

The television show covers movies, television, books, comics and community events. The show has HypaSpace daily shows and HypaSpace weekly shows which sums up the week of news. The series was casual and irreverent. HypaSpace was produced by Simon Evans and Michelle Dudas.

There were 260 episodes per year, excluding the first year, which started in May, and the sixth year, as the daily shows were pulled around mid-December with only the weekend edition airing. The daily segments stopped being produced in mid-December 2007, which meant that in its last year, the show had only 26 episodes. There were approximately 1480 episodes of the show.

In May 2005, Kim Poirier took over hosting the show, joining original host Jonathan Llyr, now a reporter for the program. Poirier left the show in July 2007.

Segments of HypaSpace aired interstitially between Space programs.

Llyr hosted the show whenever Poirier was on a break or was ill. He also hosted the HypaSpace podcast, which started on October 7, 2006. Mark Askwith then took over as the host of the podcast.

Danielle McGimsie was the new host of the show after Poirier's departure and shared hosting duties with Llyr. After Llyr was let go from the show at the end of 2007, Natasha was given a bigger role for the show. Producer Simon Evans also left the show in November 2007, and it was taken over by Michelle Dudas.

Kim Poirier returned to the show on 8 March 2008 with Natasha still presenting the games and toys portion of the show. Danielle McGimsie was no longer part of the show.

Natasha was the only presenter to be with the show during its entirety.

The last show episode aired on 27 June 2008; it was replaced by a similar show called The Circuit, which premiered on 15 August 2008, and later InnerSPACE, which debuted in 2009.

== On-air presenters ==
- Kim Poirier (2005–2008)
- Natasha Eloi (2002–2008)
- Jonathan Llyr (2002–2007)
- Danielle McGimsie (2007–2008)

== Guest presenters ==
- Colin Ferguson
- Katee Sackhoff
- Grace Park
- Teddy Wilson
- Nicki Clyne
