= Decoys (film) =

- Theatrical release poster
- Directed by: Matthew Hastings
- Written by: Matthew Hastings; Tom Berry
- Produced by: Franco Battista
- Starring: Corey Sevier; Stefanie von Pfetten; Meghan Ory; Kim Poirier; Elias Toufexis; Ennis Esmer; Richard Burgi; Nicole Eggert
- Cinematography: Daniel Villeneuve
- Edited by: Isabelle Levesque
- Music by: Daryl Bennet; Jim Guttridge
- Production companies: Sci-Fi Productions; Sound Venture Productions; Feature Film Fund; The Movie Network; Super Écran; Movie Central; Space: The Imagination Station
- Distributed by: Lions Gate Films
- Release date: February 27, 2004
- Running time: 95 minutes
- Country: Canada
- Language: English
- Budget: $5 million
- Box office: $84,733

Decoys is a 2004 Canadian science fiction horror film directed by Matthew Hastings and written by Tom Berry and Hastings. The cast included Corey Sevier and Kim Poirier. It was filmed in Ottawa, Ontario and originally broadcast on the Sci Fi Channel. The film revolves a young man named Luke on a cold winter day and discovers a few dead men, realizing that they were killed by women who were actually aliens. A sequel, Decoys 2: Alien Seduction, was released in 2007.

== Plot ==
A jock sneaks into his supposed girlfriend's house with flowers for her. It is cold inside and when he approaches his girlfriend's room he finds a dead man with his mouth wide open. He then spots two more corpses.

Elsewhere, Luke Callahan and Roger, two college freshmen and virgins, are desperate to get laid. While doing their laundry after drinking too much beer, Luke meets two seductive girls named Lily and Constance. When Lily deliberately leaves a roll of quarters in the laundry, an inebriated and horny Luke goes to return them to her. He finds her room is unlocked and he decides to sneak in, finding that it is very cold inside. But when the girls suddenly return, he decides to hide in the closet. Luke watches as the girls open the windows and let the cold winter air surround them, seemingly arousing and comforting them as they strip naked, much to Luke's amusement. He then watches in horror and confusion as reptilian tentacles unfold from their chests and sexually arouse them while Constance sprays Lily down with a can of liquid nitrogen. Luke, horrified and intrigued, decides to get to the bottom of the mystery.

Meanwhile, the police find the body of a young man named Bobby from the college, frozen from the inside out and his mouth wide open with a look of terror on his face. He oddly also has a noticeable erection. The forensic scientists assume a "keg drinking tube" was shoved down his throat, not realizing it was actually Lily, who shoved her alien tentacle down his throat while having sex with him. Luke, with his girlfriend Alex, decides to try to find out what these aliens are and if needed, exterminate them.

Luke and Roger's friend Gibby wanders into a cemetery with his girlfriend Natasha. They enter a mausoleum and begin to have sex on a cement slab. As Gibby ejaculates, Natasha reveals that she is an alien as her tentacles emerge from her chest and immobilize Gibby, a toothy ovipositor tentacle unfolds and is shoved down his throat as part of the alien mating process. After completing the mating process, Gibby freezes solid and dies, thus not surviving the mating process, much to Natasha's disappointment.

In an effort to catch the aliens in the act and prove their existence, Luke and Alex hatch a plan to record them. Luke plants a camera in his bedroom and manages to get a very-horny Lily to go to bed with him. While Alex watches from a different room, Luke and Lily disrobe and prepare to have sex. As Lily mounts him, Luke notices a strange green organ between her breasts. The camera suddenly malfunctions, and Lily realizes she's being recorded. Angered, Lily prepares to rape Luke to death and unleashes her tentacles but accidentally knocks over a candle, which starts a fire. Seemingly vulnerable to the heat, Lily screams and sheds her human form, letting Luke see what the aliens look like in their true form; humanoid reptilians. Lily escapes, but Luke and Alex fail to capture any evidence.

Constance, meanwhile, becomes emotionally engaged with Roger, explains to him that the aliens have come to Earth to impregnate men, as their race is dying out. To save their people, the aliens persuade men to come with them, promising sex. However, the "mating" process involves sticking their tentacles down the male's throat. Most men die because they cannot survive the cold temperature. Roger allows Constance to "mate" with him after she explains everything as she has fallen in love with him when she wasn't supposed to. She explains that they're merely trying to survive and that they don't want anyone to die. He agrees to allow her to impregnate him, giving her race a chance to survive. Luke comes in just in time to see an alien crawl out of Roger's mouth. Roger dies soon after, leaving Constance horrified because she didn't want him to die.

Luke has discovered that, while the aliens love the cold, they hate heat. Luke has also discovered that Gibby is dead at this point having been frozen by Natasha. Luke teams up with Detective Amanda (his former girlfriend) and obtains a home-made flamethrower, determined to put an end to the aliens' terror. Luke confronts the aliens and kills Natasha and Lily by burning them, not realizing the truth of their mission. He then chases Constance and confronts her, but the flamethrower runs out of propane. Seeing him vulnerable, Constance leaps on top of him, knocking him to the ground. She straddles him and beats him down, then releases her tentacles, preparing to throat-rape him. However, just before Luke is impregnated, Amanda shows up and shoots Constance, knocking her off. Using an ax, Luke breaks open high-pressure pipes and kills Constance with steam. Luke now has solid evidence of the aliens' existence as there were witnesses who saw them in their true form, and he leaves Amanda to deal with them while he runs off with Alex.

Alex takes Luke to her apartment, and the two profess their love for each other. They take off their clothes and prepare to have sex. Alex mounts Luke, and tells him she can finally have her way with him. There's a sudden flashback to the very beginning of the movie when the jock finds the dead men. He looks up and sees Alex who then says "You're early". Luke realizes Alex is an alien, minutes too late. He screams as she pins him down and her tentacles appear. The camera zooms out of the room as Luke's screams fade away as he is presumably raped and impregnated.

== Cast ==
- Corey Sevier as Luke Callahan
- Stefanie von Pfetten as Lilly Benson
- Kim Poirier as Constance Snowden
- Elias Toufexis as Roger
- Meghan Ory as Alex
- Ennis Esmer as Gibby
- Sarah Smyth as Rosedale Princess
- Krista Morin as Vikki Vickers
- Marc Trottier as Bobby Johnson
- Carrie Colak as Natasha
- Leah Graham as Melody
- Richard Burgi as Detective Francis Kirk
- Nicole Eggert as Detective Amanda Watts
- Don Hastings as Medical Examiner
- Mike Lobel as Halloween Jock

== See also ==
- Species (film)
