= Tomorrowland (Mad Men) =

- Mad Men episode
- Don and Betty go their separate ways as they leave the emptied Draper house
- Episode no.: Season 4 Episode 13
- Directed by: Matthew Weiner
- Written by: Jonathan Igla; Matthew Weiner
- Original air date: October 17, 2010
- Running time: 48 minutes

Guest appearances
- Kim Poirier as Camille; Christopher Stanley as Henry Francis; Deborah Lacey as Carla; Samuel Page as Dr. Greg Harris; Cara Buono as Dr. Faye Miller; Jessica Paré as Megan Calvet; Lawrence Pressman as Henry Sloan; Jack Laufer as Frank Keller; Zosia Mamet as Joyce Ramsay; Caity Lotz as Stephanie; Cassandra Jean as Caroline; Jay Seals as Marvin Woodman; Jon Manfrellotti as Art Garten

Episode chronology
← Previous "Blowing Smoke"	Next → "A Little Kiss"
- Mad Men season 4

"Tomorrowland" is the thirteenth and final episode of the fourth season of the American television drama series Mad Men, and the 52nd overall episode of the series. It aired on AMC in the United States on October 17, 2010. It was written by Jonathan Igla and showrunner Matthew Weiner, and directed by Weiner.

"Tomorrowland" was the last Mad Men episode to air for 17 months as heated contract negotiations between AMC and Weiner began after the season. A consequence of this hiatus saw the show switch from airing in the Summer/Fall to the Spring for the remainder of its run.

== Plot ==
It is October 1965. Don Draper is apprehensive due to a morning business meeting and an upcoming trip to California with his children. Don and Pete Campbell meet with the American Cancer Society to discuss potential ideas for a campaign, which results in a potential meeting with Dow Chemical. Later, Roger Sterling, Don, and Pete try to convince Ken Cosgrove to invite his future father-in-law to a round of golf with Pete, but Ken declines, preferring to keep his personal life separate. Lane Pryce gives Joan Harris a promotion, but in name only due to the firm's precarious finances.

As Betty Francis prepares to move her family out of their home, Carla permits Glen Bishop to say goodbye to Sally. Betty, upon finding Glen in her house, fires Carla, then phones Don and informs him that she does not want her to accompany Don and the kids to California. Stuck, Don impulsively asks Megan to accompany them and take care of his children. Later, Henry is furious with Betty over the decision to fire Carla and her refusal to provide her a letter of recommendation.

In California, Don discovers that Megan is great with his kids. He takes the kids to visit Anna Draper's home, where Anna's niece, Stephanie (Caity Lotz), gives Don the engagement ring that Anna had received from the real Don Draper.

Peggy receives a visit from her friend at Life magazine, who in turn introduces Peggy to a model who had just been fired from a commercial assignment for Topaz Hosiery, who has fired their ad firm and scrapped all of their ideas. Peggy passes this information to Ken Cosgrove, who is able to secure a meeting during the holiday weekend. The executives are receptive to Peggy's ideas during the meeting and hire the firm, their first new account in months.

Megan returns from a night out with her college roommate, and she and Don spend the night together. During breakfast the next morning, Bobby and Sally spill Sally's milkshake all over the table. Expecting an angry reaction, Don and the children are surprised when Megan calmly cleans up the milkshake and defuses any lingering tension. Later, back at Don's apartment in New York, Don tells Megan that he's in love with her and proposes marriage, which she accepts.

At the SCDP offices later that day, Don tells the other partners and Joan about the engagement, receiving their congratulations after a moment of shock. Peggy and Ken, elated over landing the Topaz account, are caught off guard when they learn of Don's engagement. After stalling, Don finally calls Faye Miller to end their relationship and inform her of his sudden engagement. Later, Joan vents to her husband over the phone, and reveals to the audience that she did not get an abortion and is having a baby soon.

Don arrives at the Ossining house and is surprised to find Betty still there, having arranged to meet a real estate agent. Betty confides in Don that her new home isn't perfect; Don tells her that if it isn't perfect she can move again, then tells her that he is engaged. Betty, shocked but not surprised, congratulates him. When the doorbell rings, Don walks out to answer the door and Betty walks out in the opposite direction.

== Music ==
- The lullaby that Megan teaches Sally and Bobby is "Il était un petit navire".
- The show closes with the song "I Got You Babe" by Sonny and Cher.

== Reception ==
=== Ratings ===
"Tomorrowland" attracted 2.44 million viewers and 0.8 million viewers in the coveted adults 18-49 age demographic on the night of its original airing.

=== Critical reception ===
The finale was warmly received by television critics. Alan Sepinwall praised the finale and the season, and observed that many of the characters, through their actions (using Don's marriage, Joan's pregnancy, and Betty's firing of Carla and moving out of the Ossining house as examples), were trying to create a fresh start. He predicted that during the fifth season that "many of them are going to find these fresh starts feeling like the stale lives they had before." James Poniewozik of Time magazine enjoyed the episode but was nonplussed by the small focus on the agency storyline, calling it "a pretty big oversight in ending the season, when the second half of it had largely been devoted to SCDP's existential crisis." Eric Goldman of IGN considered it a good finale, saying, "It's our nature to compare this season finale with last year's game-changing, super exciting one, and I'm guessing most will feel it comes up short. But really, 'Shut the Door. Have a Seat.' was so unique among Mad Men episodes, and it would have felt artificial to have something that huge happen again to the company itself in the subsequent finale." Keith Phipps of The A.V. Club enjoyed the episode, noting that "however low-key its tone, I think "Tomorrowland" shakes up the status quo as profoundly as 'Shut The Door. Have A Seat.' Don's been heading in one direction—down—all season and now he's not. [..] Don seems to realize for the first time this week that he has his whole life ahead of him."
