= Nicole Arbour =

Canadian actress and YouTuber

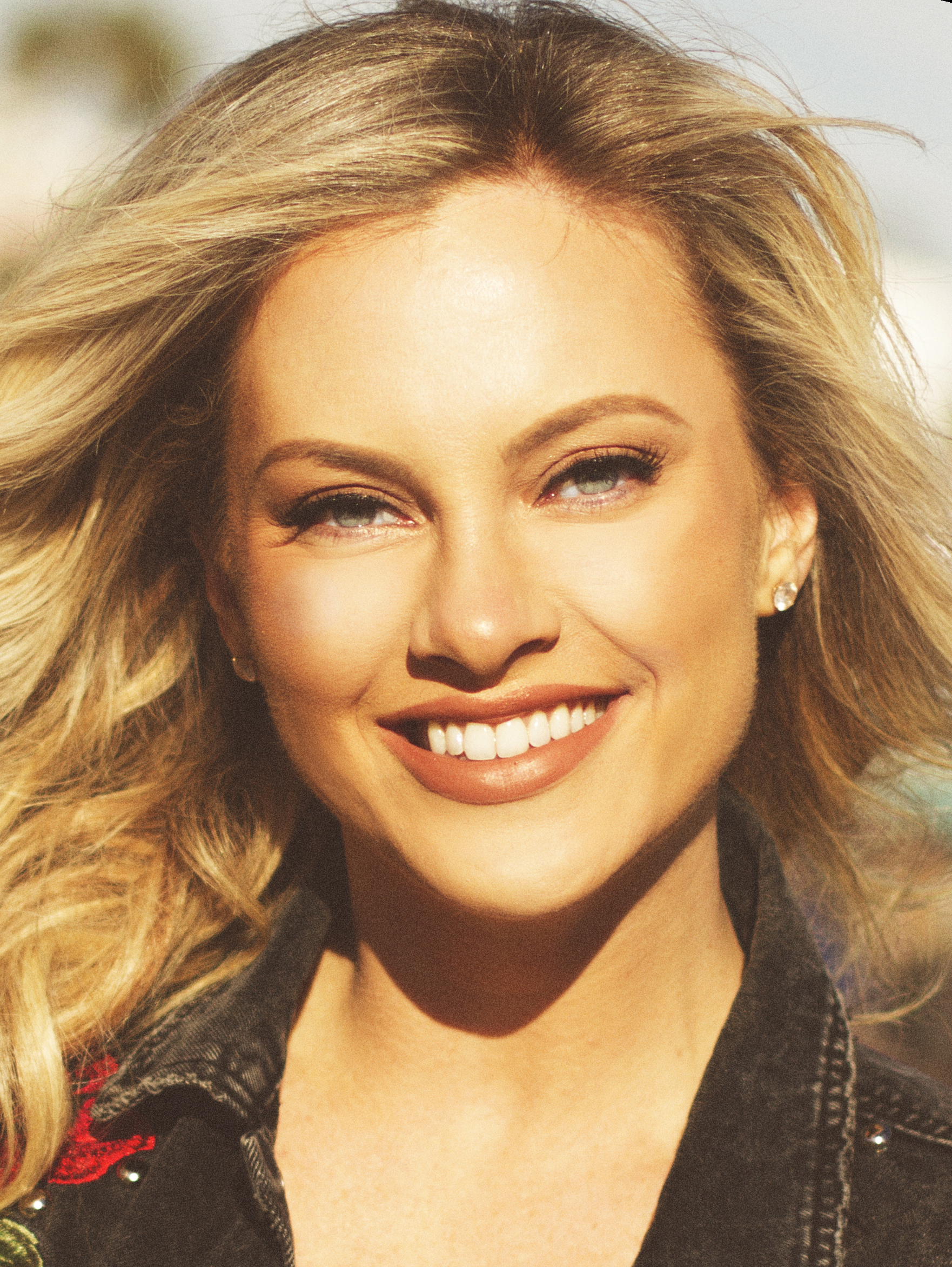
- Born: 1982 or 1983 (age 43–44); Hamilton, Ontario, Canada
- Education: Humber College
- Occupations: Actress; Choreographer; Musician; Singer; YouTuber
- Known for: YouTube, music

Nicole Arbour (born 1982/1983) is a Canadian comedian, speaker, choreographer, singer, actress, and YouTuber.

== Career ==
Arbour is a former cheerleader for the Toronto Raptors of the National Basketball Association. While studying at Humber College, she started her cheerleading career and led the Humber Hype dance team which won two national championships.

=== Acting ===
As an actress, she appeared in Howie Do It, and Silent But Deadly. Arbour's single "Bang Bang" was released on April 30, 2013. On June 18, 2015, her single and music video to "Fun Revolution" was released and was the first Periscope music video to debut. In April 2015, Arbour was nominated as a finalist for "Best Comedian" for the Shorty Awards, won by Hannibal Buress. Arbour released a single and self-directed music video to "Show Me How You Werk" on December 4, 2017.

== Controversies ==
=== "Dear Fat People" video ===
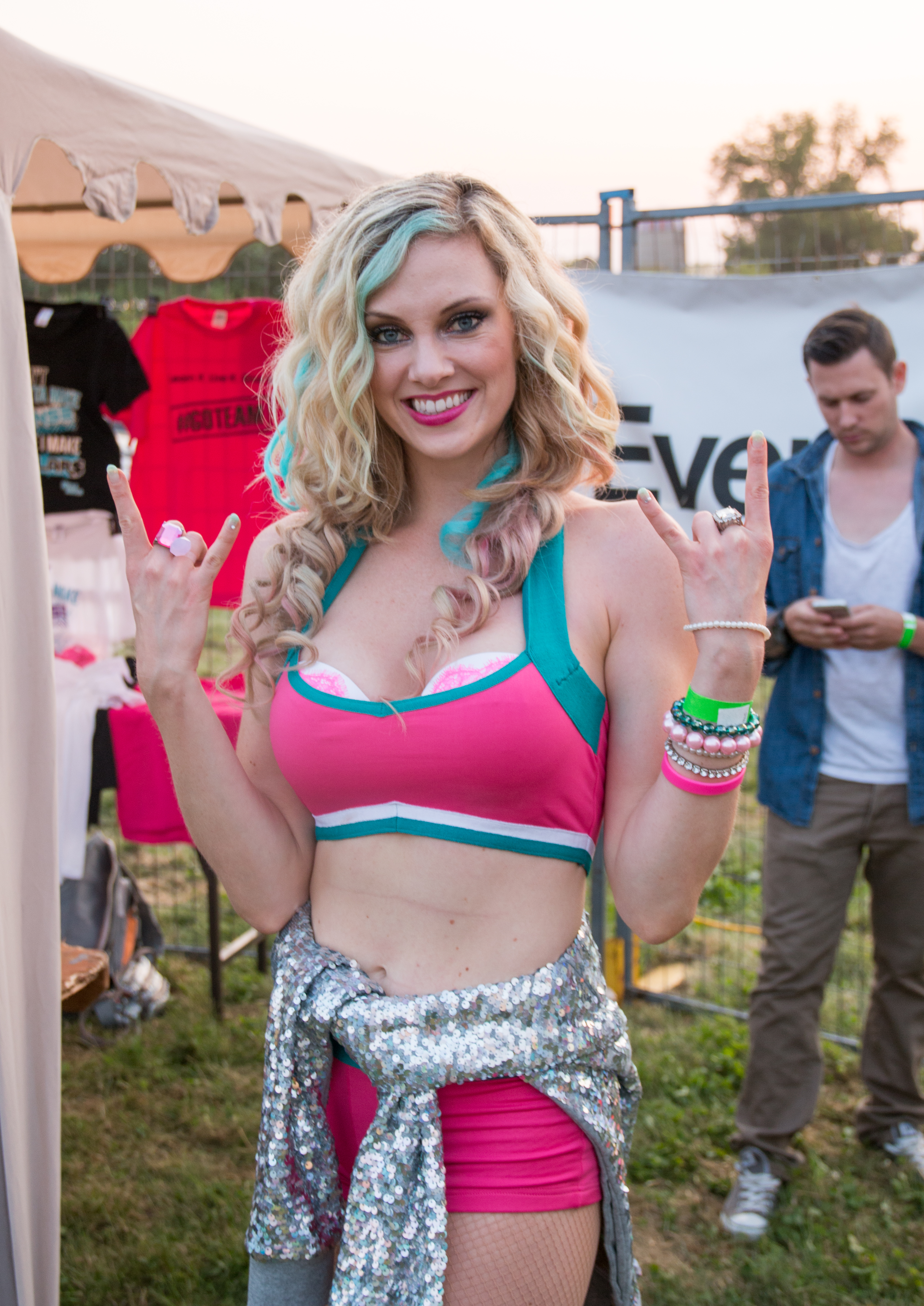
Arbour at the 2014 Hamilton Festival of Friends

In September 2015, Arbour became the subject of controversy when she posted a viral video on her YouTube channel titled "Dear Fat People". Critics argued that the video endorses fat shaming. The video was temporarily unavailable on YouTube, over claims that it violated the YouTube terms of service, but was later restored.

Arbour was the subject of both public and celebrity criticism, with plus-size model Ashley Graham labelling her comments as "disgusting".

Soon after the video was released, Canadian director Pat Mills stated publicly that he had considered hiring Arbour as a choreographer for his then-upcoming film Don't Talk to Irene after meeting with her, but that he then saw "Dear Fat People" and it "made me never want to see her again". This was reported as Arbour having been "fired" from the film, but in fact no job offer had been extended.

On September 16, 2015, Arbour appeared on The View to defend the "Dear Fat People" video, stating that "that video wasn't made to offend people...it's just satire," that she wasn't targeting those with medical conditions, and that the video wasn't supposed to be taken seriously. Time magazine stated, "Arbour doesn't see her comments as bullying, but rather an intense form of truth-telling". Arbour was quoted in the Time article saying:

I find seeing someone's head being blown off offensive ... I find children starving in a country with more than enough food offensive. I find women's bodies being mutilated for religious purposes, that is offensive to me. But words and satire I don't find offensive.

== Personal life ==
On January 1, 2024, Arbour got engaged to Jamaican musician Simon "Skygrass" Bowden.

== Filmography ==
=== Film ===
Year	Title	Role	Notes
2008	The Rocker	Trashy Groupie	
2009	You Might as Well Live	Regina Manitoba	
2011	Silent But Deadly	Jackie	

=== Television ===
Year	Title	Role	Notes
2006-2009	Video on Trial	Herself	Series regular
2007	Winnipeg Comedy Festival	Herself	Standup Comedian
2009	Howie Do It	Beautiful Assistant / Spokesmodel	Series regular; 7 episodes
2014–2015	Too Much Information	Herself	Series regular
2015	CMT's Hottest	Herself	Series regular
2015	CMT's Hottest	Herself	Series regular

== Awards and recognition ==
Year	Award	Category	Result	Ref.
2009	IAB Mixx Awards	Branded Content	Nominated	
2015	Shorty Awards	Best Comedian	Nominated	
2016	The Producers Choice Honors	Honorary Star on the Hollywood Walk of Fame	Won	
2017	International Pain Foundation Hero of Hope Awards	Nerve To Be Heard	Won	
