= Spacey Awards =

Canadian television award

- Awarded for: Best sci-fi, fantasy and horror films, television series and video games
- Country: Canada
- First award: 2003
- Final award: 2007

The Spacey Awards (also referred to as The Spaceys) was an annual award presented by the Canadian cable network Space (now known as CTV Sci-Fi Channel) from 2003 to 2007. Awards were presented in the areas of sci-fi, fantasy and horror films, television series and video games. The awards included both audience-voted categories and juried categories, whose winner was selected by a committee of employees of the channel. The award statue was an alien with large, insectoid eyes.

The awards were known for their use of humor, often with skits built around both the presenting and the receiving of awards. Rather than hosting a formal ceremony, SPACE instead took the awards to the winners, often visiting them on the set of their latest production, or in some other setting. Richard Dean Anderson of Stargate SG-1 was noted for his comedic acceptance speeches (one of which during the 2nd Spacey Awards ran so long it was run in installments throughout the broadcast). Anderson was not nominated for the 4th annual awards as he was no longer a cast member of Stargate; instead, he presented an award to the actor who replaced him on Stargate via an extended art film parody of My Dinner with Andre. The Spacey Awards were produced by Michelle Dudas and Simon Evans.

The awards were hosted by Natasha Eloi and Jonathan Llyr, with Kim Poirier becoming co-host with the 2005 awards. The Best of the Spaceys, a special showing clips from past awards, aired on May 18, 2007.

The awards were discontinued after Space's owner, CHUM Limited, was acquired by CTVglobemedia.

== 1st Spacey Awards (2003) ==
The 1st Spacey Awards were presented on June 26, 2003. Awards included a lifetime achievement award to William Shatner, and a special achievement award to the town of Vulcan, Alberta, for its municipal tourism campaign embracing and celebrating the Star Trek associations of its name.

- Favourite TV Series: Buffy the Vampire Slayer
- Favourite Canadian TV Series: Stargate SG-1
- Favourite Movie Hero: Aragorn from The Lord of the Rings: The Two Towers
- Favourite Movie Villain: Dr. Evil from Austin Powers in Goldmember
- Favourite TV Hottie: T'Pol from Star Trek: Enterprise
- Favourite Creature Character: Gollum from The Lord of the Rings: The Two Towers
- Science Fiction/Fantasy Movie: The Lord of the Rings: The Two Towers
- Best Horror/Suspense Movie: The Ring
- Best Animated Movie: Spirited Away
- Best Visual SFX: Star Wars: Episode II – Attack of the Clones
- Best Action Sequence: The Lord of the Rings: The Two Towers – Battle of Helm's Deep
- Lifetime Achievement Award: William Shatner
- Special Achievement Award: Vulcan, Alberta

== 2nd Spacey Awards (2004) ==
The 2nd Spacey Awards were presented on April 18, 2004.

- Favourite TV Character, Male: Spike, Angel
- Favorite TV Character, Female: T'Pol, Star Trek: Enterprise
- Favourite Movie Villain (Sci-Fi/Fantasy): Agent Smith, The Matrix Reloaded and The Matrix Revolutions
- Favourite Movie Villain (Horror): Death, Final Destination 2
- Favourite Canadian TV Series: Stargate SG-1
- Favourite TV Series: Angel
- Favourite Movie Hero: Jack Sparrow, Pirates of the Caribbean: The Curse of the Black Pearl
- Favourite Video Game: Star Wars: Knights of the Old Republic
- Best Action Sequence: Freeway Chase, The Matrix Reloaded
- Best Comic Book Adaptation Movie: X2: X-Men United
- Best Horror/Suspense Movie: 28 Days Later
- Best Science Fiction/Fantasy Movie: The Lord of the Rings: The Return of the King
- Best Visual SFX: The Lord of the Rings: The Return of the King
- Best Animated Movie: Finding Nemo
- Special Achievement Award: Peter Jackson
- Lifetime Achievement Award: Ray Harryhausen

== 3rd Spacey Awards (2005) ==
The 3rd Spacey Awards were presented on May 29, 2005.

- Favourite TV Character, Male: General Jonathan "Jack" O'Neill, Stargate SG-1
- Favorite TV Character, Female: T'Pol, Star Trek: Enterprise
- Favourite Movie Villain: Doc Ock, Spider-Man 2
- Favourite Canadian TV Series: Stargate SG-1
- Favourite TV Series: Star Trek: Enterprise
- Favourite Movie Hero: Spider-Man, Spider-Man 2
- Favourite Video Game: Halo 2
- Favourite Limited TV Series: Battlestar Galactica
- Favourite Movie: Harry Potter and the Prisoner of Azkaban
- Best Action Sequence: Subway Fight Sequence, Spider-Man 2
- Best Comic Book Adaptation Movie: Spider-Man 2
- Best Horror Movie: Shaun of the Dead
- Best Movie F/X: Sky Captain and the World of Tomorrow
- Best Animated Movie: The Incredibles
- Best Science Fiction/Fantasy Movie: Sky Captain and the World of Tomorrow
- Special Achievement Award: George A. Romero
- Lifetime Achievement Award: Stan Lee

== 4th Spacey Awards (2006) ==
The 4th Spacey Awards were presented on May 27, 2006.

- Favourite Movie: Serenity
- Favourite TV Show: Battlestar Galactica
- Favourite TV Ensemble Cast: Stargate SG-1
- Favourite New TV Character: Lt.-Col. Mitchell, Stargate SG-1
- Favourite Video Game: Resident Evil 4
- Favourite Action Sequence: Star Wars: Episode III – Revenge of the Sith, Anakin/Kenobi light saber fight
- Favourite FX: Star Wars Episode III: Revenge of the Sith
- Best Non-Human Performer: King Kong, King Kong
- Best Movie Villain: The Supreme Chancellor Palpatine, Star Wars III: Revenge of the Sith (Ian McDiarmid)
- Best Movie Hero: Batman, Batman Begins (Christian Bale)
- Best Horror Movie: Land of the Dead
- Best Animated Movie: Wallace and Gromit: Curse of the Were-Rabbit
- Best Comic Adaptation Movie: Sin City
- Best Sci-fi/Fantasy Movie: King Kong

== 5th Spacey Awards (2007) ==
The 5th Spacey Awards were presented on June 10, 2007.

- Favourite Character You Love to Hate: Lex Luthor, Smallville
- Favourite TV Character: Rodney McKay, Stargate Atlantis
- Favourite Kick-Ass Character: James Bond, Casino Royale
- Favourite Classic TV Show: Star Trek
- Favourite TV Show: Stargate Atlantis
- Favourite Movie: Pirates of the Caribbean: Dead Man's Chest
- Favourite Video Game: The Legend of Zelda: The Twilight Princess
- Best Movie: Pan's Labyrinth
- Best Comic Book Adaption: Superman Returns
- Best Horror: Saw III
- Best Villain: Lex Luthor, Superman Returns
- Best Animated Movie: Happy Feet
- Best Action Sequence: Casino Royale – Construction Site Chase
- Best Heroic Performance: Clark "Superman" Kent, Superman Returns

== See also ==
- Canadian television awards
