= The Sacrifice (Fear Itself) =

- Fear Itself episode
- The vampire being shot by Point
- Episode no.: Season 1 Episode 1
- Directed by: Breck Eisner
- Written by: Mick Garris; Del Howison
- Original air date: June 5, 2008

Guest appearances
- Jesse Plemons; Mircea Monroe; Stephen Martines; Rachel Miner; Jeffrey Pierce; Michelle Molineux; Reamonn Joshee; Bill Baksa

Episode chronology
← Previous —	Next → "Spooked"

"The Sacrifice" is the first episode of the television series Fear Itself. The episode originally aired on June 5, 2008. It was based on Del Howinson's short story titled "The Lost Herd." The plot revolves around four men who become stranded in an old fort—to find that it is home to an ancient vampire.

== Plot ==
Four criminals are hiding from the cops after a robbery. Navarro is injured from a bullet wound. Soon, they discover a seemingly abandoned town. Three beautiful sisters—Chelsea, Tara, and Virginia—live there with Reverend, a bedridden old man. Chelsea nurses Navarro by stitching up his wound, then sews his mouth shut. Point, the leader of the criminals, has suspicions about the women, while his younger brother Lemon and partner Diego are infatuated with them.

Virginia asks Diego to help her with something in the barn. She points to a blanket on the floor and Diego understands her. He steps on the blanket and falls into a deep pit; Virginia shuts the metal door. He uses his lighter to look for an escape, but finds a skull and begins to panic. The metal door then opens. Diego looks up hopefully, but screams in terror instead as something jumps in the pit and devours him.

Virginia then turns to Lemon (AKA Lemuel), luring him into the skin house and seducing him. He is then knocked out and wakes up hanging upside down by a chain among the skinned rabbits. Point has had enough of the women's secrets. He then finds Navarro dead with a stake through the heart. He hears a strange growling and helps the Reverend, who is chained to his bed. The creature drags the Reverend by the chain out of sight and kills him. Point goes to find Lemon. Chelsea discovers the Reverend is dead and begins to cry as his corpse rises up behind her. She whispers a prayer and then swings an axe at him, cutting off his head.

Tara, who doesn't speak, shyly goes into the skin room and shows Lemon a picture she made of him as he begs her to let him down. She hears the creature growling and backs up to the door as Lemon screams for her to help him. Outside, Point yells for Lemon and hears screams coming from the barn. When Point enters the barn, he sees a creature hanging onto his brother. The creature turns around and goes for Point. Point begins shooting it, scaring it off. Tara sees Lemon's wounds and grabs an axe as Chelsea did. Point thinks she's attacking him and he pushes her, impaling her on a spike. Point lets Lemon down. He finds the remaining two women and convinces them to tell him what's going on.

Chelsea explains that when her people came to America from Romania, the creature hid among them. It is a vampire. In order to protect the outside world, the group decided to build the fort in their attempt to keep the creature in it. Eventually, the vampire picked off each member of the town until only the three girls and their father, the Reverend, were left. The Reverend allowed the creature to feed off him slowly until visitors came. The only way to kill it (or those infected by its bite) is either by burning, a stake in the heart, or decapitation. Virginia sees Lemon's bite and tries to kill him, but Point aims his gun at her, not allowing them to kill his brother. He tries to comfort Lemon, as the women beg him to kill Lemon.

A moment after Lemon dies, he rises as a vampire and attacks Virginia and bites her. He is then killed by Point. Chelsea is forced to use Virginia as bait for the creature so she and Point can kill it. They lower her into the pit. Sure enough, the creature comes to the pit. Point can't wait and knocks the creature in as Chelsea shuts the door. Point uses an axe to make holes in the door, pours gasoline in, and throws a lamp on it as Virginia shrieks from being attacked and then burned.

Chelsea and Point escape and watch the barn burn down, Chelsea takes Point's hand and he complies. The next morning, she opens the doors to finally leave the town. She then notices that Point is bleeding. It is a bite, either from Lemon or when he pushed the vampire. He looks at her in horror; she miserably shuts the doors, knowing it isn't over.

== Filming locations ==
The episode was primarily filmed at Fort Edmonton Park, including the main fort and several other buildings.

== Ratings ==
Fear Itself's premiere episode came in second next to Swingtown with 5.2 million viewers.

== Reception ==
Critical reception for "The Sacrifice" was mixed. Some criticism centered around the episode's story, which outlets such as Dread Central found underwhelming and overly familiar while also serviceable. The A.V. Club's Scott Tobias wrote that he was expecting more from the series as the "roster of directors is tantalizing", but that "Alas, tonight’s premiere episode, “The Sacrifice” turns out to be exactly the sort of middle-of-the-road fare that I'd feared this show would put out on semi-regular basis." Variety's Phil Gallo was more favorable, stating that the episode "displays astute attention to detail and craft, even if it does not necessarily scare the bejesus out of viewers".

In April 2020 ScreenRant posted an article discussing the cancellation of Fear Itself, noting that "The Sacrifice" "ended up being one of the weaker installments".
