= Family Man (Fear Itself) =

- Fear Itself episode
- Dennis Mahoney talks to Brautigan
- Episode no.: Season 1 Episode 3
- Directed by: Ronny Yu
- Written by: Daniel Knauf
- Original air date: June 19, 2008

Guest appearances
- Colin Ferguson; Josie Davis; Brent Stait; Stephen Lobo; Clifton Collins, Jr.; Terence Kelly; Michael St. John Smith; Gig Morton; Nicole Leduc

Episode chronology
← Previous "Spooked"	Next → "In Sickness and in Health"

"Family Man" is the third episode of the NBC horror anthology Fear Itself.

== Plot ==
While driving to work Dennis Mahoney, a responsible husband and father, switches bodies with a man named Brautigan. The two men were brought into the same hospital emergency room, albeit for very different reasons. Dennis had gotten into a car accident while Brautigan was shot while being apprehended for being a prolific serial killer called the "Family Man".

Horrified and frightened for his family, Dennis makes an attempt to convince Brautigan's lawyer that the two have swapped bodies, only to have his pleas for an investigation ignored. He is visited by Brautigan, now in Dennis's body, who suggests that they help each other get through their daily lives in each other's bodies. Dennis refuses. While in jail Dennis is pressured to reveal where his victims' bodies are buried, as this will help him escape the death penalty. Dennis maintains that he is not Brautigan and therefore doesn't know where the bodies are located, repeating his plea for the attorney to investigate his claims of being Dennis. He also makes unsuccessful attempts to call his family, only for Brautigan to vow to change the phone number. His lawyer does check out his claims and says that his story details check out - but that since the two men have met it's likely that this is just a story the two have cooked up for Brautigan's defense.

Meanwhile, Brautigan has found it difficult to adjust to his life as Dennis, particularly as his personality has changed and he has trouble controlling his temper. Dennis realizes that it is just a matter of time before Brautigan hurts his family. He contacts Sherriff Weller and claims that he's ready to show them where the bodies are located. He leads them to the neighborhood where his family lives, where he successfully steals a gun and escapes. He makes his way home, where he fights Brautigan and chokes him into unconsciousness just as Weller comes into the home and shoots Dennis.

Dennis comes to in his own body, only to discover that Brautigan has murdered his wife and son. Only his daughter Courtney was spared and when the sheriff asks the girl who hurt her mother and brother, she points at Dennis, who realizes that he will not be able to convince anyone of his innocence.

== Cast ==
- Colin Ferguson as Dennis Mahoney
- Josie Davis as Kathy Mahoney
- Clifton Collins, Jr. as Brautigan
- Michael St. John Smith as Sheriff Weller
- Nicole Leduc as Courtney

== Reception ==
"Family Man" received reviews from outlets such as Slant, The A.V. Club, and Bloody Disgusting, the latter of which wrote that it was "the first episode of FEAR ITSELF that approximates the kind of vibe that the old horror anthologies provided in spades." IGN was critical of the episode, criticizing the writing and joking that the 1987 Dudley Moore film Like Father, Like Son was more terrifying.
