= Decoys 2: Alien Seduction =

Decoys 2: The Second Seduction
- North American DVD cover
- Directed by: Jeffery Scott Lando
- Written by: Miguel Tejada-Flores (screenplay); Tom Berry (story)
- Produced by: Franco Battista and Douglas Berquist
- Starring: Tyler Johnston; Kim Poirier; Corey Sevier; Dina Meyer; Tobin Bell
- Cinematography: John Spooner
- Music by: Steve London
- Production companies: Reel One Entertainment; Alien Girls Films; Decoys Productions; Tom Berry Productions
- Distributed by: Sony Pictures Home Entertainment
- Release date: 6 March 2007
- Running time: 94 minutes
- Country: Canada
- Language: English
- Budget: CA$2,000,000 (estimated)

Decoys 2: Alien Seduction is a 2007 Canadian science fiction horror film directed by Jeffery Scott Lando, and written by Miguel Tejada-Flores and Tom Berry. It is the sequel to the film Decoys. It was originally titled Decoys 2: Rebirth, with its North American DVD release title being Decoys: The Second Seduction.

Actress Kim Poirier and actor Corey Sevier return from the original film, while the film also stars Tobin Bell and Dina Meyer.

It was originally due to air on TV but was given a straight-to-DVD release. Critic Scott Weinburg, of DVD Talk, gave the film a 2* review, summarizing with the advice "Skip It".

== Plot ==
Set in a different northwestern city some years after the events of the first film, the film opens with a beautiful young woman, Delia, making out with a guy in a car on a cold, snowy night. After being interrupted by a passing-by officer, the two resume their activity only for tentacles to erupt from Delia's chest.

In an Evolutionary Biology class held by Prof. Erwin Buckton, the first film's protagonist, Luke Callahan, is shown to have survived his encounter with Alex. Part of the class are Sam Compton and Stephanie Baxter. When Prof. Buckton's class ends, Luke sees from a distance one of the aliens he had a hand in killing previously: Constance Snowden. Constance now is under the guise of a doctor. He later visits his psychiatrist, Dr. Alana Geisner. Though he tells her the Aliens and the events of the first film are a product of his dreams and hallucinations instead of actual events, he reveals to her that he doesn't know how he survived, only that he woke up in a hospital days later being attended by a psychiatrist. Dr. Geisner hands Luke a full container of Anti-Hallucigens which only seems to make Luke more agitated.

Sam returns to his dorm room where his friends and dormmates - Henry Robbins, Peter Brunson and Nick Dean - hatch a sex-fuel competition to see who can hook-up with the most women by the end of the summer with the winner earning a hefty sum of cash. It involves recording the event as proof while also keeping it all a big secret. Initially against the idea, Sam is convinced to join.

Another alien disguised as an attractive human woman, Jasmine, is caught speeding by the same officer from the start of the film. She seduces but accidentally kills the officer.

Luke mistakes Stephanie for Constance but is able to ease the situation. The two chat while heading for Stephanie's dorm about Constance who Luke says was someone his best friend used to like but she did bad things to him. All the while Constance has been viewing them from afar. Now the leader of the Decoys, Constance warns her fellow Decoys, Jasmine and Delia, not to leave behind bodies for the police to find. Learning from Luke's survival, Constance deduces that their mates need to have passion and must be slowly aroused and excited even further. Using this tactic, the Decoys use their telepathy to figure out their intended mates fetishes and secret desires. Constance heads over to Prof. Buckton's office where she falsely warns him that Luke is a paranoid and delusional man obsessed with aliens. Buckton would later find Luke drawing remarkably detailed sketches of the Decoys with one looking very similar to Constance.

Sam, Henry, Peter and Nick head for a bar to initiate their competition. Only Nick succeeds. Later that night, Henry meets Delia who discovers his fetish of leopard skin clothes. In spite of it all, Henry resists her due to him being a virgin. An old friend of Sam's, Arnold Steiner, discovers the four's competition and persuades them to let him join. Despite having been told to keep it a secret, Arnold blurts it out to several of their male schoolmates who then want to partake. Arnold gets seduced by Jasmine. He borrows Sam's phone and follows Jasmine outside to the cold. Jasmine dresses up as a Dominatrix which has the desired effect the Decoys want. Jasmine successfully mates with Arnold but is interrupted by Sam who saw partial footage of Arnold in danger sent from his phone before it froze over. Sam finds a paralyzed Arnold and his phone and calls for the police. But Arnold's body ends up missing causing the police to dismiss Sam's call as a prank and claim that Arnold simply left.

Stephanie tells Sam of Luke's supposed hallucinations of the aliens and informs him that they are "allergic to fire". Peter encounters Delia who dresses up like a school girl. Delia fails in her attempt as Peter accidentally turns on the heating system. Peter relays what happened to Sam and Henry, saying that she was "allergic to fire". Sam rushes over to Stephanie's dorm and then they break into Luke's dormroom where they find multiple newspaper clippings about aliens and frozen bodies. Stephanie opens a window claiming, "It's too hot in here."

Luke has another appointment with Dr. Geisner who at first he suspected of being a Decoy. Dr. Geisner clears up that she isn't and that Luke can trust her. Luke meets Sam outside who reveals believes him. Luke sees Constance and chases after her but is hindered by Sam and a hospital guard. Dr. Geisner has him detained as a patient, but Sam would later sneak him out of the hospital.

Luke and Sam set out to find the Decoys in a Hawaiian theme party. The telltale sign being the lack of belly buttons. Sam finds a now blonde Stephanie dressed sexily being surrounded by boys. Stephanie takes Sam outside to the cold to escape the heat of the party. Meanwhile, Nick starts making out with Jasmine with Peter watching the live recording. Jasmine's tentacles burst from her chest but Nick is able to hold her off. Peter goes to get Sam and Henry for help. Sam luckily finds Stephanie's belly button. Stephanie realizes that Sam and Luke suspected her of being an alien and was about to walk away mad until Peter gets their attention. They see the footage of Nick being attacked by Jasmine. They arrive to Nick's aid and save him, as Jasmine takes off.

Luke realizes the Decoys have been using the hospital's morgue as a hideout and a nest due to the morgue being rarely used and cold. The group gathers some flares, prepares Molotov Cocktails and makes makeshift Flamethrowers using a lighter taped to a bottle of hairspray. In the hospital, Henry kills Delia, Peter and Nick kill Angeline, and Sam and Stephanie kill Jasmine for Arnold's sake. Dr. Geisner makes it in time to see the last Decoy Constance in her true form and assists Luke in killing her. Sam and Stephanie get together which makes Sam the winner since he actually got a girlfriend instead of a fling.

The group hear a sound from another room. There they find the missing victims including Prof. Buckton and Arnold who are still alive but cold and unconscious. Alien offspring soon start breaking out of their father's chests and the group is last heard screaming. The words "The End... Maybe" appear on screen before fading to black.

== Cast ==
- Corey Sevier as Luke Callahan
- Tyler Johnston as Sam Compton
- Kailin See as Stephanie Baxter
- Kim Poirier as Constance Snowden
- Lindsay Maxwell as Jasmine
- Michelle Molineux as Delia
- Brad Goddard as Nick Dean
- Ryan Ash as Peter Brunson
- Reamonn Joshee as Henry Robbins
- Sam Easton as Arnold Steiner
- Tobin Bell as Professor Erwin Buckton
- Dina Meyer as Dr. Alana Geisner
- Natalie McFetridge as Angeline
- Darcy Glassford as Rocky
- Ira Lee Gathers as Evan
- Jessica Parker Kennedy as Beautiful Girl
