= 2001: A Space Road Odyssey =

2001 Canadian television series that aired on Space channel

2001: A Space Road Odyssey is a Canadian television series that aired on Space in 2001. It documented a three-month journey across Canada in search of quirky locations with connections to science fiction and the paranormal.

It was hosted by videographer Natasha Eloi and voiceover personality Steve Anthony. It initially aired as short interstitial segments between programs, which were later compiled into a full half-hour series.

The series has been credited as helping to widely publicize the town of Vulcan, Alberta, which was named as such before the emergence of the Star Trek franchise but has embraced the connection with a number of Star Trek-themed tourist attractions.
