= Silent but Deadly =

2011 television film directed by Stephen Scott

- Created by: Dennis Travers
- Written by: Erin Berry; David Pluscauskas; Lori Kelly; Joel Plue
- Directed by: Stephen Scott
- Starring: Kim Poirier; Jason Mewes; William Sadler
- Country of origin: Canada
- Original language: English

Production
- Producers: Erin Berry; Mike Carriere; Jonathan Dueck; Michael Patrick
- Running time: 80 minutes

Original release
- Release: November 11, 2011

Silent but Deadly is a Canadian 2011 horror comedy film starring Kim Poirier, Jason Mewes, and William Sadler. It is a MJC Entertainment Inc production. It premiered on the Canadian TV channel Super Channel on November 11, 2011. The film takes place in Louisiana, but was filmed in Chatham-Kent, Ontario.

== Plot ==
A mute, illiterate Louisiana farmer's son with an extreme fondness for goats becomes a serial killer who goes after anyone who hurts goats, and wreaks havoc on an unsuspecting film crew shooting a film in the area. A subplot involves a small crew following a sheriff investigating the murders.

== Cast ==
- Jason Mewes as Thomas Capper
- William Sadler as John Capper
- Kim Poirier as Sandra Gibson
- Jordan Prentice as Sheriff Shelby
- Nicole Arbour as Jackie
- Patrick McKenna as Victor
- R.D. Reid as Ed
- Benz Antoine as Deputy Jimbo
- Marc Hickox as Bobby
- Vanessa Burns as Anya
- Jai Jai Jones as Winston
- Aaron Walpole as Rob
- Anand Rajaram as Kyle
- Michael Majeski as Stan
- Rebeka Coles-Budrys as Titianna
- Jesse Powell as Set PA

== Reception ==
It has a user rating of 18% on Rotten Tomatoes.
