= Michelle Molineux =

Canadian actress and singer

- Born: August 29, 1986 (age 39); Edmonton, Alberta, Canada
- Occupations: Actress, voice actress, singer
- Years active: 2006–present

Michelle Molineux (born August 29, 1986) is a Canadian actress and singer. She was born in Edmonton, Alberta, Canada and attended the University of Alberta. Molineux is best known for her role as an alien seductress in Decoys 2: Alien Seduction released in 2007.

Some of Molineux's other credits include playing Tara, a haunting siren in "The Sacrifice", Sally in The Pharmacist, and Claire in Love/Hate. Molineux is also a voice-over artist working with Ocean Studios' Blue Water Studios on English dubs of anime. She is known for voicing Honoka/Hannah (Cure White) in the English dub of Futari wa Pretty Cure.

== Filmography ==
=== Live-action roles ===
- Christmas in Wonderland (2006) – Spa Attendant
- The Manikin (Short) (2006) – Helen
- Decoys 2: Alien Seduction (2007) – Delia, The Beautiful Alien Seductress
- Fear Itself – episode "The Sacrifice" (2008) – Tara
- Mixed Blessings – episode "Boyfriends Back" (2009) – Waitress
- The Pharmacist (2010) – Sally
- Love/Hate (2011) – Claire
- Nightmare Island 2: Hookface's Revenge (2011) – Suzy

=== Voice roles ===
- Futari wa Pretty Cure – Honoka Yukishiro (Hannah Whitehouse)/Cure White
- Deltora Quest – Francoise
- Viper's Creed – Megumu
- Cardfight!! Vanguard – Rekka
- Scan2Go – Fiona
- The Star, Moon, Sun, and Heart- Sophie Walker
- The Turn of The Blue Moon- Lisette and Celestia Anderson
- The New Adventures of Peter Pan – Tinker Bell
- World Trigger - Haruka Ayatsuji, Ichinose
- Metallions - Aries, Infinity, Ghost
