= Jonathan Llyr =

Canadian actor and TV personality (born 1966)

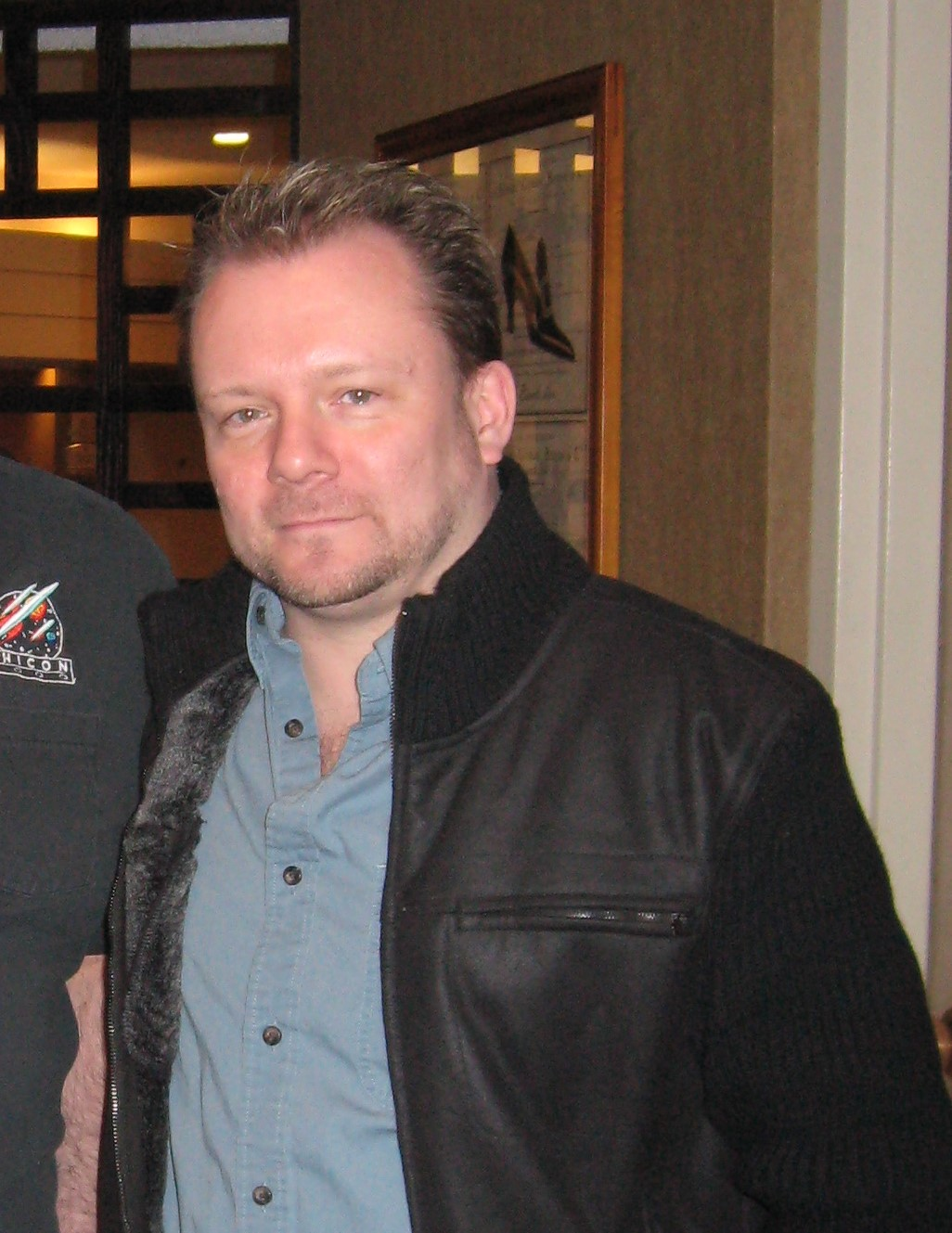
- Jonathan Llyr, March 2008
- Born: 1966 (age 59–60)
- Occupations: Actor, On-Air Presenter
- Years active: 1998-present

Jonathan Llyr (born 1966) is a Canadian actor and TV personality.

Llyr (sometimes credited as Jonathan Bryn Llyr) is best known for his work as an on-air personality for Space, Canada's science fiction specialty channel. He first appeared on that network in 1998 on its late-night movie interstitial program, SpaceBar, as the alien barfly and ultimate Star Trek fan, Grot. During the show's final year, Llyr also assumed writing duties, after fellow cast member and head writer Denis McGrath left the series.

After SpaceBar's 2002 cancellation, Llyr transferred to hosting Space's new entertainment news program, HypaSpace. He remained as host until 2005, when he was succeeded by actress Kim Poirier. Llyr stayed on as one of HypaSpace's reporters, and fronted his own weekly segment, "The Scoop", an often tongue-in-cheek look at strange celebrity and science fiction media news items of the week. Llyr also hosted the weekly audio podcast version of HypaSpace, and the network's annual Spacey Awards for science fiction and fantasy television and film.

For several years during his time at Space, Llyr also introduced films on Space's sister station, Drive-In Classics, this time as the character of Drive-In Dick. Again, Llyr had writing duties for these segments.

Llyr was also a founding member of the Toronto, Ontario, based Shakespearean theatre company, The Tempest Theatre Group, (where he played a variety of roles including Hamlet, MacBeth, Marc Antony and Iago among many others) and has appeared in various episodes of the Decoder Ring Theatre including a number of different roles in The Red Panda Adventures and as the titular character in Deck Gibson, Far Reach Commander.

On May 1, 2008, Llyr and several colleagues launched their own podcast project, "Hardcore Nerdity".

In 2013 Llyr guested on the television show "Nikita" and in 2014 appeared as Mick O'Shea in four episodes of Murdoch Mysteries.

Llyr also co-wrote the acclaimed middle-grade novel How to Curse in Hieroglyphics (2013) with Lesley Livingston. The sequel, The Haunting of Heck House was released in October 2014.
