= La Grande Illusion =

1937 war film directed by Jean Renoir

- French film poster
- Directed by: Jean Renoir
- Written by: Charles Spaak; Jean Renoir
- Produced by: Albert Pinkovitch; Frank Rollmer
- Starring: Jean Gabin; Dita Parlo; Pierre Fresnay; Erich von Stroheim; Julien Carette; Georges Péclet; Marcel Dalio
- Cinematography: Christian Matras
- Edited by: Marguerite Renoir; Marthe Huguet
- Music by: Joseph Kosma
- Production company: Réalisation d'Art Cinématographique
- Distributed by: Réalisation d'Art Cinématographique
- Release date: 8 June 1937
- Running time: 114 minutes
- Country: France
- Languages: French; German; English
- Box office: $414,620 (US re-release)

La Grande Illusion (commonly known in English as "The Grand Illusion") is a 1937 French war drama film directed by Jean Renoir, who co-wrote the screenplay with Charles Spaak. The story concerns class relationships among a small group of French officers who are German prisoners of war during World War I who are plotting an escape.

The title of the film comes from the 1909 book The Great Illusion by British journalist Norman Angell, which argued that war is futile because of the common economic interests of all European nations. The perspective of the film is generously humanistic to its characters of various nationalities.

La Grande Illusion is regarded by critics and film historians as one of the masterpieces of French cinema. Orson Welles named La Grande Illusion as one of the two movies he would take with him "on the ark". Director and producer Sydney Pollack picked La Grande Illusion as one of his ten favorite films of all time.

In 1958, the film was voted number 5 on the prestigious Brussels 12 list at the 1958 World Expo. In 1995, the Vatican included La Grande Illusion in its list of 45 "great films" under the category of "Art". Empire magazine ranked it #35 in "The 100 Best Films Of World Cinema" in 2010.

== Plot ==
During the First World War, two French aviators, the aristocratic Captain de Boëldieu and the working-class Lieutenant Maréchal, are shot down by German flying ace and aristocrat Rittmeister von Rauffenstein, and both are taken prisoner. Rauffenstein invites them to lunch and bonds with Boëldieu over their shared background and mutual acquaintances.

Boëldieu and Maréchal are then taken to a prisoner-of-war camp, where they meet a colorful group of French prisoners and stage a vaudeville-type performance. When word arrives that the French have recaptured Fort Douaumont in the Battle of Verdun, Maréchal interrupts the show, and the French prisoners spontaneously burst into "La Marseillaise". As a result, Maréchal is placed in solitary confinement; the fort changes hands once more while he is imprisoned. Boëldieu and Maréchal help their fellow prisoners dig an escape tunnel, but just before it is completed they are transferred to other camps.

Following several failed escape attempts and relocations, Boëldieu and Maréchal arrive in Wintersborn, a supposedly inescapable mountain fortress commanded by Rauffenstein, who has been badly wounded and given a posting away from the front, much to his regret. The two Frenchmen are reunited with a fellow prisoner from the original camp, Rosenthal, a wealthy French Jew who generously shares the food parcels he receives. After carefully observing the Germans, Boëldieu devises a plan whereby he would volunteer to distract the guards long enough for Maréchal and Rosenthal to escape. Maréchal and Rosenthal successfully flee the fortress using a homemade rope, but Boëldieu is fatally wounded by Rauffenstein, who shoots him reluctantly out of duty and does not intend to kill. On his deathbed, Boëldieu expresses pity for a grieving Rauffenstein, who will have to find a new purpose in the postwar world where nobility no longer has relevance.

Maréchal and Rosenthal journey across the German countryside, trying to reach neutral Switzerland. Rosenthal injures his foot, and the two are forced to take refuge in the modest farmhouse of a German woman, Elsa, who lost her husband at Verdun, along with three brothers at battles she describes as Germany's "greatest victories". She and Maréchal fall in love despite their language barrier, and they celebrate Christmas together. Following a few weeks of recuperation, Maréchal and Rosenthal continue their journey. Maréchal declares he will come back to Elsa and her young daughter, Lotte, if he survives the war.

A German patrol sights the two fugitives in a snow-covered valley. They fire a few rounds but are stopped by their commanding officer, who says the pair have crossed into Switzerland.

== Cast ==
- Jean Gabin as Lieutenant Maréchal, a French officer, of modest social background
- Marcel Dalio as Lieutenant Rosenthal, a French officer, of nouveau riche Ashkenazi Jewish ancestry
- Pierre Fresnay as Captain de Boëldieu, a French staff officer and member of the French nobility
- Erich von Stroheim as Captain (later Major) von Rauffenstein, a German flying ace and member of the German nobility
- Dita Parlo as Elsa, a German farmwife and war widow
- Julien Carette as Cartier, the vaudeville performer
- Gaston Modot as an engineer
- Georges Péclet as an officer
- Werner Florian as Sgt. Arthur
- Jean Dasté as a teacher
- Sylvain Itkine as Lieutenant Demolder
- Jacques Becker as British officer (uncredited)

== Political and historical themes ==
Renoir used the First World War (1914–1918) as a lens through which to examine Europe as it faced the rising spectre of fascism (especially in Nazi Germany) and the impending approach of the Second World War (1939–1945). Renoir's critique of contemporary politics and ideology celebrates the universal humanity that transcends national and racial boundaries and radical nationalism, suggesting that mankind's common experiences should prevail above political division, and its extension: war.

On the message of La Grande Illusion, Renoir himself said, in a film trailer, dating from the re-release of the film in 1958: "[La Grande Illusion is] a story about human relationships. I am confident that such a question is so important today that if we don't solve it, we will just have to say 'goodbye' to our beautiful world." Despite widespread interest in the subject, Renoir found it difficult to find a producer and distributor, having to "shop around" the project for years.

=== Class ===
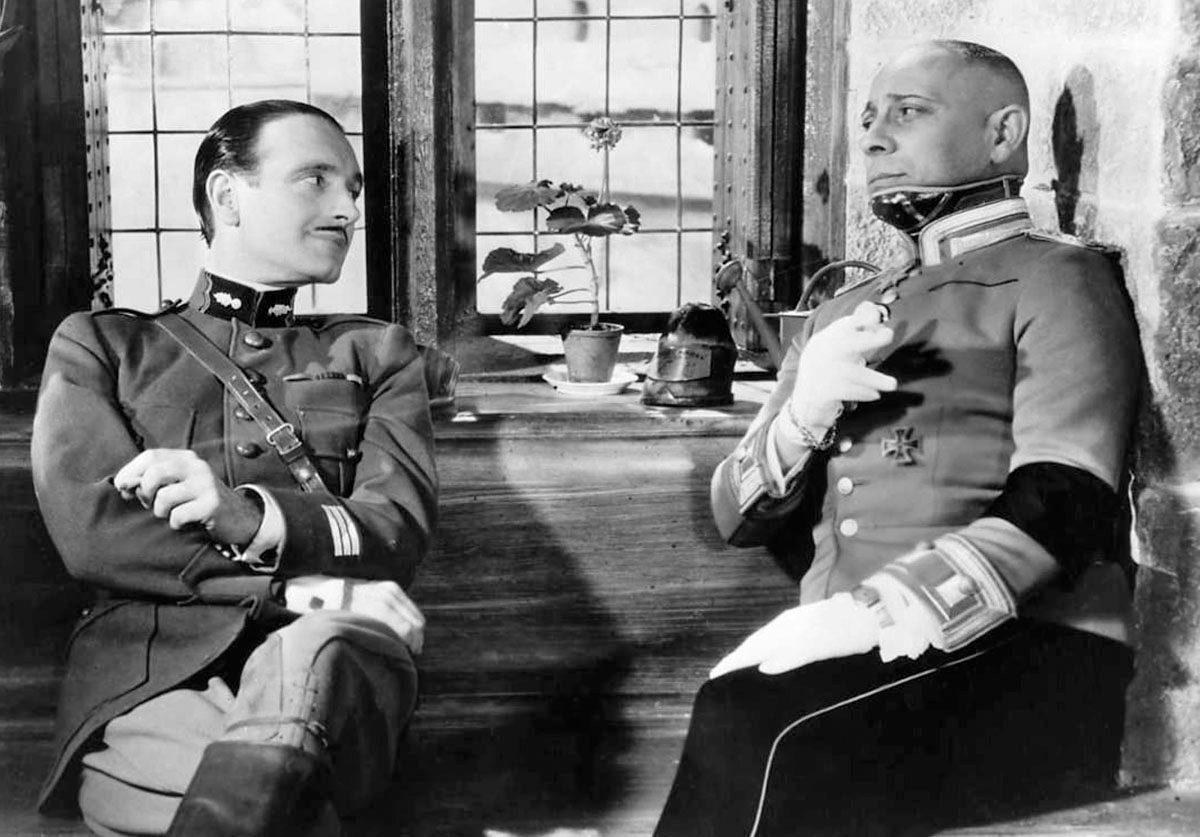
Pierre Fresnay and Erich von Stroheim in Rauffenstein's Wintersborn office

La Grande Illusion examines the relationships between different social classes in Europe. Two of the main characters, Boëldieu and Rauffenstein, are aristocrats. They are represented as cosmopolitan men, educated in many cultures and conversant in several languages. Their level of education and their devotion to social conventions and rituals makes them feel closer to each other than to the lower class of their own nation. They share similar social experiences: dining at Maxim's in Paris, courting dalliances with the same woman, and even know of each other through acquaintances. They converse with each other in heavily formal French and German, and in moments of intimate personal conversation, escape into English as if to hide these comments from their lower class counterparts.

Renoir depicts the rule of the aristocracy in La Grande Illusion as in decline, to be replaced by a new, emerging social order, led by men who were not born to privilege. He emphasizes that their class is no longer an essential component to their respective nation's politics. Both Rauffenstein and Boëldieu view their military service as a duty, and see the war as having a purpose; as such, Renoir depicts them as laudable but tragic figures whose world is disappearing and who are trapped in a code of life that is rapidly becoming meaningless. Both are aware that their time is past, but their reaction to this reality diverges: Boëldieu accepts the fate of the aristocracy as a positive improvement, but Rauffenstein does not, lamenting what he sarcastically calls the "charming legacy of the French Revolution".

In La Grande Illusion, Renoir contrasts the aristocrats with characters such as Maréchal (Gabin), an engineer from Paris. The lower class characters have little in common with each other; they have different interests and are not worldly in their views or education. Nonetheless, they have a kinship too, through common sentiment and experience.

Renoir's message is made clear when the aristocratic Boëldieu sacrifices himself by distracting the prison guards by dancing around, singing, and playing a flute, to allow Maréchal and Rosenthal, members of the lower class, to escape. Reluctantly and strictly out of duty, Rauffenstein is forced to shoot Boëldieu, an act that Boëldieu admits he would have been compelled to do were the circumstances reversed. However, in accepting his inevitable death, Boëldieu takes comfort in the idea that "For a commoner, dying in a war is a tragedy. But for you and me, it's a good way out", and states that he has pity for Rauffenstein who will struggle to find a purpose in the new social order of the world where his traditions, experiences, and background are obsolete.

The critique of the romantic idealization of duty in La Grande Illusion is comparable to that in the earlier film All Quiet on the Western Front (1930), based on the novel by Erich Maria Remarque.

=== Prejudice ===
In La Grande Illusion, Renoir briefly touches on the question of antisemitism through the character of Rosenthal, a son from a nouveau riche Jewish banking family (a parallel to the Rothschild banking family of France). His biographers believed that Renoir created this character to counter the rising anti-Jewish campaign enacted by Adolf Hitler's government in Nazi Germany. Further, Rosenthal is shown as a symbol of humanity across class lines: though he may be financially wealthy, he shares his food parcels with everyone so that he and his fellow prisoners are well fed — when compared with their German captors. Through the character of Rosenthal, Renoir rebuffs Jewish stereotypes.

There is also a black French officer among the prisoners at Wintersborn who appears to be ignored by the other prisoners, and not accepted as an equal by them. When he speaks to them he is not responded to. For instance, when he shows his artwork, he is shrugged off.

=== War ===
In La Grande Illusion Renoir seeks to refute the notion that war accomplishes anything, or that it can be used as a political tool to solve problems and create a better world. "That's all an illusion", says Rosenthal, speaking of the belief that this is the war that will end war forever.

La Grande Illusion is a war film without any depiction of battle. Instead, the prisoner of war camp setting is used as a space in which soldiers of many nations have a common experience. Renoir portrays war as a futile exercise. For instance, Elsa, the German widow, shows photos to Maréchal and Rosenthal of her husband and her brothers who were killed, respectively, at the battles of Verdun, Liège, Charleroi, and Tannenberg. The last three of these battles were amongst Germany's most celebrated victories in World War I. Through this device, Renoir refutes the notion that one common man's bravery, honor, or duty can make an impact on a great event. This undermines the idealistic intention of Maréchal and Rosenthal to return to the front, so that by returning to the fight they can help end this war.

== Production ==
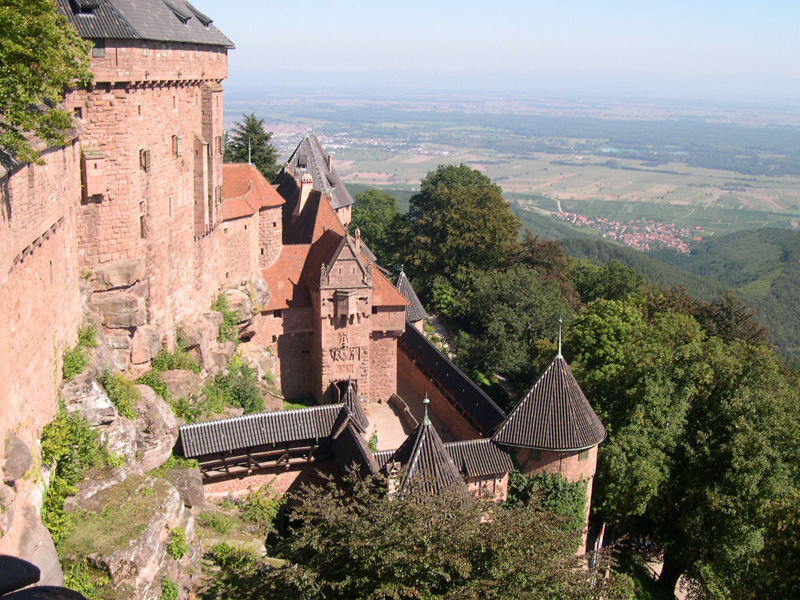
Château du Haut-Kœnigsbourg, which appears in the film.

Elements of La Grande Illusion are semi-autobiographical in nature. Jean Renoir was a reconnaissance pilot during World War I, and received a change of post after being wounded in action. Renoir's life was saved by a French pilot, Armand Pinsard, when he was under attack by a German Fokker in 1915, during the First World War. In 1935, during the production of Toni, Pinsard recounted his WWI history, shot down seven times, captured seven times, and escaping seven times from German POW camps, inspiring La Grande Illusion, and Pinsard became the model for Lt. Maréchal. Renoir used his own uniform as Jean Gabin's costume in the film. Several other cast members had also fought in the war, Marcel Dalio won the Croix de Guerre for his actions with the French artillery during the Action at Villers-Cotterêts (1914), and Pierre Fresnay was in the army between 1916 and 1919. Renoir developed the screenplay with Charles Spaak, and spent several years trying to finance it. Through Albert Pinkévitch, an assistant to the financier, Frank Rollmer, and the attachment of Jean Gabin, private producers finally supported a small production budget.

The casting of Erich von Stroheim came as Renoir was a great admirer of the director's films, and had inspired him to pursue filmmaking. According to Renoir's memoirs, Stroheim, despite having been born in Vienna, Austria (then the Austro-Hungarian Empire) did not speak much German as he had been living in the United States since 1909, and struggled with learning the language along with his lines in between filming scenes. Renoir eventually resorted to hiring a dialect coach to help Stroheim with his lines.

La Grande Illusion was filmed in the winter of 1936–37. The exteriors of "Burg Wintersborn" were filmed at the Upper Koenigsbourg Castle in Alsace. Other exteriors were filmed at the artillery barracks at Colmar (built by Wilhelm II) and at Neuf-Brisach on the Upper Rhine. The interiors were shot at Épinay and Billancourt Studios.

== Soundtrack ==
The score was written by the Hungarian composer Joseph Kosma, who also wrote the famous song "Autumn Leaves". The soundtrack also includes many well-known songs of the day from French, English, and German culture. The uncredited musical director was the film and music critic Émile Vuillermoz, who had been a composer in his early career.

Songs:

- "Frou-Frou" (1897) lyrics written by Montréal and Blondeau, music by Henri Chatau, performed by Lucile Panis.
- "Il était un petit navire" ("There Once was a Little Ship"), played by Boëldieu with his penny whistle to distract the German guards from Rosenthal and Maréchal's escape, a traditional French song about a shipwrecked sailor who must cannibalize another sailor to survive. Later in the film, the fugitives Rosenthal and Maréchal shout the song sarcastically at one another as they have a near falling out. The lyrics speak to their own condition of running out of food. As Maréchal realizes this, his singing trails off.
- "Frère Jacques", a French nursery rhyme
- "It's a Long Way to Tipperary"
- "Si tu veux Marguerite" (1913) by Harry Fragson
- "La Marseillaise", the French national anthem

== Reception ==
=== Europe ===
Although the film was recognized at the Venice Film Festival for "Best Artistic Ensemble" and was favored to win the Mussolini Cup for best foreign film in 1937, Benito Mussolini overruled the jury and prevented its win, prompting Jean Zay, then France's Minister of National Education and Fine Arts, to propose the creation of a French festival that would become the Festival de Cannes.

Nazi Propaganda Minister Joseph Goebbels declared La Grande Illusion "Cinematic Public Enemy No. 1" and ordered the prints to be confiscated and destroyed, with Vichy French authorities banning the film in 1940, pour la durée des hostilités (for the duration of hostilities) in an effort to appease Hitler just prior to the German occupation of France. When the German Army marched into France in May 1940, Goebbels ordered the film's prints and negative to be the first things seized by the Nazis, and the ban renewed by the German Propaganda-Abteilung in October of the same year.

Despite the ban, La Grande Illusion became a massive hit in France, with an estimated 12 million admissions.

=== United States and elsewhere ===
La Grande Illusion, released by World Pictures Corporation in the U.S. premiered on 12 September 1938 in New York City; Frank S. Nugent in his review for The New York Times called La Grande Illusion a "strange and interesting film" that "owes much to his cast",

Erich von Stroheim's appearance as von Rauffenstein reminds us again of Hollywood's folly in permitting so fine an actor to remain idle and unwanted. Pierre Fresnay's de Boeldieu is a model of gentlemanly decadence. Jean Gabin and Dalio as the fugitives, Dita Parlo as the German girl, and all the others are thoroughly right.

La Grande Illusion won the awards for Best Foreign Film at the 1938 New York Film Critics Circle Awards and at the 1938 National Board of Review Awards it was named the Best Foreign Language Film for that year. At the 11th Academy Awards held on 23 February 1939, La Grande Illusion became the first foreign language film nominated for the Academy Award for Best Picture.

At the time of its release, John Ford, impressed with the film, opted to remake it in English but was urged by studio chief Darryl F. Zanuck not to. "You'll never top it," he told Ford.

Orson Welles, in an interview with Dick Cavett on 27 July 1970, expressed that if he only could save a handful of films that were not his own for future posterity, this would be one of those films.

Martin Scorsese included it on a list of "39 Essential Foreign Films for a Young Filmmaker".

Sixty years after its release, Janet Maslin called it "one of the most haunting of all war films" and an "oasis of subtlety, moral intelligence and deep emotion on the cinematic landscape"; according to Maslin:

It seems especially disarming now in its genius for keeping its story indirect yet its meaning perfectly clear. Its greatest dramatic heights seem to occur almost effortlessly, as a tale of escape derived from the experience of one of Renoir's wartime comrades evolves into a series of unforgettable crises and stirring sacrifices.

Film critic Roger Ebert also reviewed the film after its 1999 re-release, and added it to his list of The Great Movies:

Apart from its other achievements, Jean Renoir's Grand Illusion influenced two famous later movie sequences. The digging of the escape tunnel in The Great Escape and the singing of the "Marseillaise" to enrage the Germans in Casablanca can first be observed in Renoir's 1937 masterpiece. Even the details of the tunnel dig are the same—the way the prisoners hide the excavated dirt in their pants and shake it out on the parade ground during exercise. But if Grand Illusion had been merely a source of later inspiration, it wouldn't be on so many lists of great films. It's not a movie about a prison escape, nor is it jingoistic in its politics; it's a meditation on the collapse of the old order of European civilization. Perhaps that was always a sentimental upper-class illusion, the notion that gentlemen on both sides of the lines subscribed to the same code of behaviour. Whatever it was, it died in the trenches of World War I.

Pauline Kael praised the film: "Jean Renoir directed this elegy for the death of the old European aristocracy, and it is one of the true masterpieces of the screen." Leslie Halliwell wrote: "Celebrated mood piece with much to say about war and mankind: more precisely, it is impeccably acted and directed and has real tragic force." Filmmaker Akira Kurosawa cited La Grande Illusion as one of his favorite films. In 2006, Writers Guild of America West ranked its screenplay 85th in WGA's list of 101 Greatest Screenplays. In the 2012 Sight and Sound critic's poll to determine the greatest films of all time, the film was ranked at 73rd place. In the 2022 Sight and Sound critic's poll, it was ranked at 146th place.

The February 2020 issue of New York Magazine lists La Grande Illusion as among "The Best Movies That Lost Best Picture at the Oscars".

On the review aggregator website Rotten Tomatoes, 97% of 74 critics' reviews are positive. The website's consensus reads: "Jean Renoir's Grand Illusion is a masterful anti-war statement, bringing humane insight and an undercurrent of ironic humor to an unusual relationship between captor and captive."

== Prints and home media ==
For many years, the original nitrate film negative of La Grande Illusion was thought to have been lost in an Allied air raid in 1942 that destroyed a leading laboratory outside Paris. Prints of the film were rediscovered in 1958 and restored and re-released during the early 1960s. Then, it was revealed that the original negative had been shipped back to Berlin (probably due to the efforts of Frank Hensel) to be stored in the Reichsfilmarchiv vaults. In the Allied occupation of Berlin in 1945, the Reichsfilmarchiv by chance was in the Russian zone and consequently shipped along with many other films back to be the basis of the Soviet Gosfilmofond film archive in Moscow. The negative was returned to France in the 1960s, but sat unidentified in storage in Toulouse Cinémathèque for over 30 years, as no one suspected it had survived. It was rediscovered in the early 1990s as the Cinémathèque's nitrate collection was slowly being transferred to the French Film Archives at Bois d'Arcy.

In August 1999, Rialto Pictures re-released the film in the United States, based on the Cinémathèque negative found in Toulouse; after watching the new print at Lincoln Plaza Cinemas, Janet Maslin called it "beautifully refurbished" and "especially lucid". A transfer of this restored print was released on DVD by the Criterion Collection in 1999 as spine number 1, but has been out of print since 2005. Grand Illusion was intended to be Criterion's first release on the DVD format in 1998, but the discovery of the new negative delayed its release.

In 2012, StudioCanal and Lionsgate released a 1080p Blu-ray version based on a new high-definition scan of the original negative. According to Lee Kline, Technical Director of the Criterion Collection, this release was "night and day of what we did—because they had better film."

== See also ==
- Poetic realism
