= Il était un petit navire =

French song

"Il était un petit navire" (pronounced [il‿etɛt‿œ̃ pət'i nav'iʁ], lit. 'There was a little ship') is a traditional French song that is now considered a children's song, despite its macabre tone.

The song tells the story of a young sailor who is about to be eaten by the other sailors. They discuss how to cook the man and what sauce to use. He then prays for the Virgin Mary's intercession and is saved by a miracle.

== Lyrics ==
Il était un petit navire, {x2}
qui n’avait ja-ja-jamais navigué. {x2}
Refrain:
Ohé ! Ohé !
𝄆 Ohé ! Ohé ! Matelot,
Matelot navigue sur les flots. 𝄇

Il partit pour un long voyage {x2}
sur la mer Mé-Mé-Méditerranée. {x2}
Refrain

Au bout de cinq à six semaines, (×2)
les vivres vin-vin-vinrent à manquer. (×2)
Refrain

On tira z'à la courte paille, (×2)
pour savoir qui-qui-qui serait mangé. (×2)
Refrain

Le sort tomba sur le plus jeune, (×2)
c’est donc lui qui-qui-qui fut désigné. (×2)
Refrain

On cherche alors à quelle sauce, (×2)
le pauvre enfant-fant-fant sera mangé. (×2)
Refrain

L’un voulait qu’on le mît à frire, (×2)
l’autre voulait-lait-lait, le fricasser. (×2)
Refrain

Pendant qu’ainsi l’on délibère, (×2)
il monte en haut-haut-haut du grand hunier. (×2)
Refrain

Il fait au ciel une prière (×2)
interrogeant-geant-geant l’immensité. (×2)
Refrain

Mais regardant la mer entière, (×2)
il vit des flots-flots-flots de tous côtés. (×2)
Refrain

Oh ! Sainte Vierge ma patronne, (×2)
cria le pau-pau-pauvre infortuné. (×2)
Refrain

Si j’ai péché, vite pardonne, (×2)
empêche les de-de-de me manger. (×2)
Refrain

Au même instant un grand miracle, (×2)
pour l’enfant fut-fut-fut réalisé. (×2)
Refrain

Des p’tits poissons dans le navire, (×2)
sautèrent par-par-par et par milliers. (×2)
Refrain

On les prit, on les mit à frire, (×2)
le jeune mou-mou-mousse fut sauvé. (×2)
Refrain

Si cette histoire vous amuse, (×2)
nous allons la-la-la recommencer. (×2)
Refrain

There was once a little boat (×2)
that never on the sea had sailed. (×2)
Chorus:
Ahoy! Ahoy!
𝄆 Ahoy! Ahoy! Sailor,
Sailor sailing on the high sea. 𝄇

It undertook a long journey, (×2)
on the Mediterranean sea. (×2)
Chorus

After five or six weeks, (×2)
rations began to wane. (×2)
Chorus

Straws were drawn all around, (×2)
to figure out who'd be eaten. (×2)
Chorus

Fate selected the youngest boy, (×2)
it was thus him that was called. (×2)
Chorus

Now t'was wondered with what sauce, (×2)
the poor boy would be eaten. (×2)
Chorus

One wanted to fry him shallow, (×2)
other cook him in a stew. (×2)
Chorus

As the decision was being made, (×2)
he clambered to t'top of the tallest sail. (×2)
Chorus

He implored heaven with a prayer, (×2)
called out to infinity. (×2)
Chorus

Looking upon the surrounding sea, (×2)
he saw naught but waves as far as eyes could see. (×2)
Chorus

Hail! Blessed Virgin Mary, (×2)
cried out the unlucky boy. (×2)
Chorus

If I have sinned, quickly forgive, (×2)
please stop them from eating me. (×2)
Chorus

At that moment, a miracle, (×2)
for the boy was performed. (×2)
Chorus

Small fishes upon the deck, (×2)
leapt by the thousands. (×2)
Chorus

Quickly they were grabbed and fried, (×2)
and the ship's boy was saved. (×2)
Chorus

If to your liking was this tale, (×2)
well, let us tell it again. (×2)
Chorus

== In popular culture ==
- Soldiers sing this song in the 1937 film La Grande Illusion.
- The bard Cacofonix starts to sing this song to Roman slaves on a boat in Asterix the Gladiator (1964).
- It is sung in its former version by 'la grenouille' at the end of Pirates (1986 film).
- The song is sung by Anne Boleyn in the television series The Tudors, episode 9 of season 2, "The Act of Treason" (2008).
- The song is featured in the Mad Men episode "Tomorrowland" (2010).
- On Peter, Paul and Mary's 2014 Discovered: Live in Concert album, Peter Yarrow and Noel Stookey sing an adapted English version.
- A verse is used in the intro to episode 4 of the 2019 French horror TV series Marianne.
- In 2019, the song was covered by French pop singer Nolwenn Leroy.
- In the 2020 film The Man in the Hat, two musicians aboard a ferry sing this song.
- In the 2021 series Showtrial, Talitha Campbell sings the song to ease her anxiety.
- In the 2023 video game Street Fighter 6, Manon vocalizes the refrain when performing her Critical Art.

== In other languages ==
- German: "War einst ein kleines Segelschiffchen"
- Greek: "Ήταν ένα μικρό καράβι" [Itan ena mikro karavi]
