= Decoder Ring Theatre =

Canadian theatre and audio production company

- Decoder Ring Theatre logo

Presentation
- Hosted by: Gregg Taylor
- Genre: Audio drama, lodcast

Publication
- Original release: August 27, 2005

Decoder Ring Theatre is a Canadian theatre and audio production company based in Toronto. It runs a podcast of the same name that has two series: Red Panda Adventures and Black Jack Justice, both of which are done in the style of old-time radio and are released on alternating weeks.

== History ==
The group was first formed in 1999 by the actor-writer Gregg Taylor for a six-part mini-series take on the adventure programs of 1940s radio. (See “Original Red Panda mini-series” below). The programs were created as a pilot project for traditional broadcast, and were quite broad and silly in the belief that a comic approach might broaden their commercial potential. They were never broadcast.

Taylor's next project returned to the theatre, and was also radio-based, leading him to keep using the “Decoder Ring” name. The original Black Jack Justice was a one-act farce about a very, very bad day in the life of an old-time detective radio series. The show was a great success at the 2001 Toronto Fringe Festival, and led Taylor to continue under the Decoder Ring Theatre title. The next year the company returned to the Fringe with Prometheus Unplugged, a comic take on the Promethean legends in which Mankind returns to Prometheus' mountain to inform God that he does not exist. Needless to say, God was less than thrilled.

The company was officially incorporated that year, and began a series of comic murder-mysteries to raise revenue for future projects. The series included Murder Most Deadly, Death on the Avon and The Case of the Cockeyed Cupid. It was at this point that the company launched the first version of its website, decoderringtheatre.com, and included MP3 versions of the almost-forgotten Red Panda mini-series. Soon it was receiving -email from all over the world asking for more, and Taylor began the long process of accumulating scripts, equipment and performers for an ongoing podcast audio drama series.

A new, completely re-invented Red Panda continuity was launched as The Red Panda Adventures, losing the parody and playing much straighter to the conventions of old-time radio and comic books. The eponymous play-within-a-play from Black Jack Justice was revived, with its battling central characters, and launched as a sister show. On October 15, 2005, Decoder Ring Theatre officially left behind the greasepaint and empty chairs of the theatre for the Internet.

On August 25, 2006, the first seasons of The Red Panda Adventures, and on September 12, 2006 Black Jack Justice, were made available on separate feeds at Podiobooks.com.

=== Awards ===
Award	Year	Category	Result	Ref.
Parsec Awards	2006	Best Audio Drama (Short)	Finalist	
Parsec Awards	2008	Best Speculative Fiction Magazine or Anthology Podcast	Finalist	
Parsec Awards	2008	Best Speculative Fiction Audio Drama (Short Form)	Finalist	
Parsec Awards	2010	Best Speculative Fiction Audio Drama (Short Form)	Won	
Parsec Awards	2011	Best Speculative Fiction Audio Drama (Short Form)	Finalist	
Parsec Awards	2012	Best Speculative Fiction Audio Drama (Short Form)	Finalist	
Podcast Awards	2010	Arts	Won	

== Podcast series ==
- Red Panda Adventures
- Abagail Branagan Starting 2019. Stories of varying length about Abagail Branagan, a girl in middle-school who starts her own detective agency.

=== Black Jack Justice ===
Black Jack Justice is a podcast radio drama series in the style of old time radio private detective shows, written, directed and produced by Gregg Taylor for Decoder Ring Theatre. It follows two detectives, Jack Justice and his partner Trixie Dixon. When Taylor decided to begin producing radio dramas for podcasting, he decided to actually produce Black Jack Justice as a series along with Red Panda Adventures.

=== Deck Gibson, Far Reach Commander ===
==== Old series ====
In summer 2007, Decoder Ring Theatre released the Summer Showcase, an anthology featuring six new podcasts showcasing stories by different writers. The most popular of these were two episodes of the space opera Deck Gibson, Far Reach Commander, written and created by Parsec Award-winning author Matt Wallace (The Failed Cities Monologues).

In summer 2008, six new episodes of Deck Gibson were introduced. The podcast chronicles the adventures of Deck Gibson as he follows the mission of the Far Reach Fleet: to explore, to discover, to defend. Now he soars beyond frontiers of the galaxy never before seen by human eyes.

On June 27, 2013, an ebook by Matt Wallace (creator) entitled Deck Gibson: The Complete Scripts was released on Amazon.com. As of April 2014, however, no more episodes of Deck Gibson have been produced.

==== Dramatis personae ====
- Deck Gibson – Once an ace pilot and crack gunner for the feared Quasar Corps of Earth (call sign: Draco), Deck was lost in the depths of space after a brutal space battle, his damaged starfighter rescued by the alien Far Reach Fleet. He now pilots the Far Reach 1. He has a younger brother named Billy. His father piloted a Comet Tail starfighter for 20 years in the Quasar Corps under the call sign "Titan". Voiced by Jonathan Llyr.
- Control – Little is known about the feminine voice that delivers mission orders to the Commanders of the Far Reach Fleet, not even her location at Far Reach Fleet Headquarters. Voiced by Lesley Livingston.
- Rick Stringer – The only other human to ever join the Far Reach Fleet, Commander Stringer piloted the Far Reach 12 until he was killed in battle with the Sneg known as "Black Scales". Before joining the Far Reach Fleet, Stringer had led the dissident Earth group "Citizens of the Milky Way", advocates for open borders and integration with alien races.
- Black Scales – Captain of the Sneg pirate barge, "The Slither". Voiced by Steven Burley. [Character DECEASED]
- Entheriel – A ward of the Stardust Dancers who was prophesied to destroy Haznon, the ruler of the insectoid Dran Empire, at the end of the universe. She is the last known member of the Hylemna [sp?], a powerful race of beings now all but extinct. Voiced by Monica Coté.
- Lt. Jason T. McDowell – Once a member of an elite Quasar Corps squadron (Call sign: Hercules) along with "Helix", "Craterface", "Blackeye", "Dumbbell", "Eight-burst", "California" and squadron leader Deck "Draco" Gibson. "Herc" was assigned to terminate his friend Deck under the belief that Gibson was a traitor giving Earth's secrets to the Far Reach Fleet. Voiced by Gregg Taylor.

==== Known alien races ====
- The Sneg – A race of crocodile-men, brutal creatures only interested in plunder. Their thick, scaly hides can withstand the vacuum of space.
- Sulkanians
- Stardust Dancers
- Hylemna
- Abatians
- Acroxians – A race of scientists and healers annihilated by the xenocidal Quasar Corps.
- Metalonians – Known to Earthers as "Plutonium Men", these radioactive metallic beings generate intense amounts of energy and travel in bio-metallic starships.
- Dran Empire – A race of insectoid conquerors.
