= Red Panda Adventures =

Canadian radio drama series

The Red Panda Adventures is a radio drama series in the style of old time radio that follows the 1930s adventures of "Canada's greatest superhero", the Red Panda, and his sidekick, that "fearless fighting female", the Flying Squirrel, as they protect the citizens of Toronto, Ontario from villains ranging from gangsters and supervillains to the supernatural forces of darkness.

The series was created by Gregg Taylor of Decoder Ring Theatre and earned the company multiple Podcast Award and Parsec Award nominations. In 2010 the series won the Parsec Award for excellence in Speculative Fiction Audio Drama (Long Form), and earned Decoder Ring Theatre the Podcast Award for best podcast in the Cultural/Arts Category. The series has spawned a series of novels written within continuity and in the style of the classic pulp fiction stories of the 1930s and 1940s. The Tales of the Red Panda books includes the 2011 winner of the Pulp Ark Award for best New Pulp Fiction Novel, Tales of the Red Panda: The Android Assassins. Decoder Ring Theatre was profiled on the BBC Television program "Click" in February 2011, leading to new exposure for the Red Panda Adventures in the UK. The radio drama series also inspired a spin-off series of comic book adventures published digitally by MonkeyBrain Comics, and collected in trade paperback edition by IDW Publishing. The comic books, written by series author Gregg Taylor and illustrated by artist Dean Kotz have been highly praised by industry media outlets such as Comic Book Resources and Bleeding Cool. Both the audio drama and comic series have been featured in the Toronto Star, and the Television program "Innerspace" on Space, the Imagination Station

== Current series ==
Seasons 1–9 of The Red Panda Adventures each ran for 12 episodes. Seasons 10 and 11 were each six episodes long, with a new episode released on the first of every other month, alternating with Black Jack Justice.

=== Tales of the Red Panda Novels ===
The Tales of the Red Panda novel series is written by Gregg Taylor and styled after Golden Age hero pulp magazines like The Shadow, Doc Savage and The Spider. The novels tell new stories set in the same continuity as the audio drama, with events from one sometimes being mentioned in the other.

- The Crime Cabal (June 2009)
- The Mind Master (December 2009)
- The Android Assassins (August 2010)
- The Pyramid of Peril (September 2014)

=== Mask of the Red Panda Comics ===

Announced on 13 December 2012 on the official Facebook page, Mask of the Red Panda was a 3-issue digital comic miniseries available via Comixology. The first issue was released 27 February 2013, and received positive reviews. As with the novels, it featured an all new story in the same continuity, written by Gregg Taylor. The art is provided by Dean Kotz, and it is published by MonkeyBrain Comics. IDW Publishing released a trade paperback edition of the miniseries in February 2014.

After the initial three-issue series a Kickstarter campaign was run to create a "full-cast video comic" of the series. The intent was to raise money for not only the video, but also to fund new issues of the comic. At the close of the campaign, Taylor announced that enough money had been raised to provide for at least 8 new issues of the series.

Beginning with issue 4 in March 2014, the comic series was renamed The Red Panda. Taylor began telling comic stories in two parts, adding bonus features to the digital releases.

=== Dramatis Personae ===
==== The Terrific Twosome of Toronto ====
- The Red Panda: The Red Panda is a hero in the mystery man mold of the pulp era. His costume is limited to a suit and hat with a bright red domino mask (with Batman-like blank eyes) and matching red gauntlets. He has great skill with unarmed combat styles (especially judo) and uses a variety of devices, mostly of his own devising, to fight injustice. These include Static Shoes which use the power of static electricity to cling to sheer surfaces, and to jump great distances when traveling over rooftops. He is also a master of hypnotism, which he uses to extract information, project false images into the minds of others and, when necessary, to erase the memories of others. When not patrolling the city as the marvelous masked mystery man known as the Red Panda, he reverts to his secret identity, August Fenwick (known only as "one of the city's wealthiest men" until episode 48 "Operation: Cold Feet"), a young millionaire/billionaire playboy (the amount has fluctuated throughout the series). In this guise, he bears many similarities to Bruce Wayne, Lamont Cranston and Don Diego Vega, though in a much lighter tone. It is mentioned repeatedly throughout the series that the Red Panda hates having to put on the mask of the spoiled, selfish rich boy: "[the Red Panda] became who I am. The spoiled rich boy became more of a thin character sketch than a person." The Red Panda fights crime for many reasons, first and foremost because of an altruistic desire to help those who can't help themselves, but also out of a desire to atone for the selfish, greed-driven actions of his family. "Great acts of cruelty were committed by men I knew to be kind." Voiced by Gregg Taylor.
- The Flying Squirrel: Katya "Kit" Baxter, sidekick and driver of the Red Panda, is head over heels for "The Boss", whose secret identity she discovered on her own, and whom she convinced to let her help. Her costume consists of a gray catsuit and cowl (or as the Red Panda puts it, "a delightfully form-fitting unitard"), goggles, and a utility belt (though she does think it makes her look "hippy"). Only scattered bits of information about her appearance have been revealed. What is known is that she is 5 ft. 6, in her early 20s, has red hair and brown eyes, and after her recent stint at the beach, also has freckles. She has a vicious streak when it comes to dealing with criminals. Like the Red Panda, she uses a wide array of crime-fighting gizmos including Static Shoes, Grapple Guns and Gas Grenades. But while he would turn to hypnosis for interrogation, she is more likely to use her fists, which she does with great glee. She has the skill to back up her pugilistic tendencies; thanks to the training of the Red Panda, this former taxi driver is now a black belt in jujitsu, judo, and possibly other fighting styles including professional boxing which is partly due to the fact that her father was a boxer and she picked up a few things from him as she grew up. The gliding membranes in her squirrel suit allow her to glide short distances and perform amazing feats of acrobatic daring-do. The relationship between the two heroes is the heart of the show, with Kit desperately trying to clue the Red Panda in to her feelings, only to be thwarted time and time again by his total obliviousness. The two finally come out with their emotions when Kit is thought to be dead by the Red Panda and he kisses her when she springs back to life. From the start of the fifth season, the couple are married, and the introductory narrative has been updated. Voiced by Clarissa Der Nederlanden Taylor.

==== Agents and Allies ====
- Patch Little (Agent 101)
- Gregor Sampson (Agent 33): Deep cover agent of the Red Panda. Died in "When Darkness Falls". Voiced by Peter Nicol.
- Dr. Carlson (Agent 45): Prominent doctor at a local hospital and agent of the Red Panda.
- Detective Andy Parker (Agent 51): Good-natured officer of the law who previously had a crush on the Flying Squirrel, but is now engaged to be married to his librarian fiancée. He became a captain in the Canadian army during the war and was reported as missing in action in the Dieppe raid. Voiced by Brian Vaughan.
- Susan Kerwin (Agent 79): Agent of the Red Panda who works to uncover the shysters Vin and Tom in "The Dream Factory." It is likely that Susan Kerwin is not her real name, as it was also used as Kit Baxter's alias in "The Ghost Ship." Voiced by Denise Anderson.
- Bank Worker (Agent 107): An as yet unnamed agent who participated in the takedown of the shysters Vin and Tom in "The Dream Factory." Voice by Tim Vant.
- (Sgt.) Eugene "Mac" Tully (Agent 148): Elevator operator and agent of the Red Panda. Reported as missing in action in the Dieppe raid. Voiced by Kevin Robinson.
- (Pvt.) Robert "Ace" Kirby: Former crook who joined the Red Panda's team in "The End Game". Reported as missing in action in the Dieppe raid. Voiced by Steven Burley.
- Morris "Tank" Brody: Agent. Reported as missing in action in the Dieppe raid. Voiced by Christopher Mott.
- Joseph "Joe" McDonald: Agent. Reported as missing in action in the Dieppe raid.
- Edward "Eddie" Minsk: Agent. Reported as missing in action in the Dieppe raid.
- Harry "Eagle Eyes" Kelly (Agent 391): The youngest agent of the Red Panda, who takes small jobs as a delivery boy or shoe shiner in order to gather and pass information for the Red Panda. He might also be the kid who sells special [also known as 'extra'] editions to the Chronicle whenever newspaper headlines figure in the show. Harry has the sharp sight and exceptional observation powers of innocent youth. He often notices things other agents seem to miss. In the episode "The Rat Lord", Harry gained a code name: the Black Cap. By "All the King's Men" he is 16, almost 17. Voiced by Shannon Arnold (young Harry) and Scott Moyle (teenage Harry).
- Spiro Pappas (Agent #?): A Contact Man for some of the Red Panda's agents, including Constable Parker. Even at age 65 he is still a formidable combatant, as evidenced in his undercover work as a member of the "Callahan Gang". Owns a training facility for prizefighters. Announced to have died of a heart attack during "All the King's Men". Voiced by Michael Booth.
- Old Mister Finelman (Agent #?): A pharmacist and a Contact Man for some of the Red Panda's agents, including Harry Kelly.
- William Bilkey (Agent #?): A file clerk in the Harbormaster's Office and an agent of the Red Panda.
- Myron McKellar (Agent #?): An orderly at the Queen Street Lunatic Sanitarium for the Criminally Deranged and an agent of the Red Panda. It was he who warned the Red Panda about Simon Radford's (the Electric Eel's) release from the Sanitarium. He also made a short 'on-screen' appearance when he guided the masked heroes to the fallen Dr. Bygot in "The Hand of Fate". Tortured and killed by the Electric Eel and/or the Genie in "Trial by terror". Voiced by Brian Vaughan.
- Dr. Davis (Agent #?): One of the world's most renowned biochemists. As one of the Red Panda's many agents at the oft-mentioned and as yet unnamed local university, Dr. Davis gave the Red Panda and the Flying Squirrel immunity to their own knockout gas and formulated the antitoxin against the madness drug in "The Hand of Fate."
- Bert Mendel(Agent #?): A coroner and very skittish agent of the Red Panda. Though he did aid our masked heroes with morgue advice in both "Riddle of the Sphinx" and "The Hand of Fate," he did so reluctantly and with little enthusiasm, more concerned with keeping his job than helping the city. Not a great deal is known about him, but it is hinted that he serves the Red Panda as part of a life debt from a previous daring rescue. Voiced by Scott Moyle.
- Dr. Theodore Chronopolis: Scientist, inventor and the foremost expert on the combination of magic and science. The good Doctor has an unfinished time machine in Season One of RPA (mentioned in episode 3 "Rabbit Season") that was possibly completed sometime prior to the Season Two finale episode 24, "The World Next Door", and used by the Red Panda in a previously untold adventure to travel to the past, possibly in an adventure hinted at in episode 12, "The Deadliest Game". He is very disorganized and absent-minded, but is very friendly and well mannered. Apparently, is counterpart from the other the world next door is some kind of supervillain. Lost his memory in "The Wild West". Voiced by Peter Nicol.
- Tom Tomorrow: Heroic "Man of the Future". Equipped with Rocket Boots and other amazing futuristic gizmos. Formerly a member of the Justice Union, he was evicted from the group after a binding resolution was passed against temporal beings. Died defending England from the Nazi invasion. Voiced by Jonathan Llyr and Christopher Mott.
- The Stranger: Maxwell Falconi, international stage magician and mystic protector of the mortal realm. One of the first masked mystery men and one of the Red Panda's mentors. His catchphrase was "Danger was my constant companion". He was apparently quite successful, considering that Kit Baxter recognized the phrase and remembered the outfit even after he had been long retired. Officially works under the rule of the Council of Mages, but disobeys their rules about not interfering in mortal affairs. Retired member of The Society of Gentlemen Adventurers. Reenter the world of magic the fight the Nazi's in the occult war. Sacrificed himself in order prevent them from getting their hands on the most powerful objects. Voiced by Peter Higginson.
- Lady Prianne Harcourne: An agent of the Council of Mages. Voiced by Crysta Luszczek.
- Chief O'Mally: Chief of the Toronto Police and the official guardian of law and order in the city. Despite his gruff nature, he is a good man and does his best to protect the people of Toronto. An example of this passionate side of him appears in his argument with the Flying Squirrel in "The Callahan Mob". When she brought up dealing with the criminals, he responded hotly, "If beating the living daylights out of them would've put a stop to this, I'd have put my badge in a drawer and taken a squad down there months ago!" He began the series with a healthy dislike of the Terrific Twosome of Toronto that bordered on hate, but as time passed he has gained a grudging respect for the masked heroes. He still doesn't like them, but he recognizes that they are able to deal with foes he can't, and his desire to protect the city wins out over his annoyance. Voiced by Michael Booth and Christopher Mott.
- Baboon McSmoothie/Brian McSweeney: Time-traveling, dimension-jumping Man of a Thousand Faces from a parallel future universe. In the real world he is revealed to be a thief for hire working for the Australians named Brian McSweeney. Voiced by Gregory Z. Cooke.
- Marie, the Voodoo Priestess: A profoundly mysterious individual. First appearing in "The Empty Box", Marie (though that is a pseudonym, her real name is unknown) is a priestess of the ancient ritual magics of Africa, known to the uninitiated as Voodoo. An old friend of the Stranger, she should have been advanced in years, but thanks to her abilities she didn't appear older than 40. The Flying Squirrel sought her counsel on the advice of Maxwell Falconi in pursuit of Professor Hex. Though certainly not an enemy, it would be difficult to call Marie a friend. She seems to have an outlook on life and the world far different than that of our masked heroes. As she said, "there is nothing, neither good nor bad, but thinking makes it so. There is no power in the world so great in its goodness that it cannot be turned to evil." Voiced by Julie Cogger.
- Red Squirrel: Kim Fenwick, Kit Baxter's great-great-granddaughter, who traveled back from the future to stop the supervillain The Puppeteer from killing the Flying Squirrel or the Red Panda to get the Red Squirrel out of his way. The thought was that if Kim no longer had one or both of the Terrific Twosome of Toronto as heroic inspiration, she would have never become a superhero at all, or at least she would be a less effective one. Little is known about the Red Squirrel's background, but a few details can be gleaned. She looks almost exactly the same as Kit, so much so that the shock of the resemblance broke the Red Panda's hypnotic probe. The author has commented that she is still somewhat new to her role as a costumed crimefighter, which was hinted when the Red Panda easily tricked her into revealing herself during their first meeting. Mr. Taylor also speculated that she had traveled back from sometime between 2012 and 2021, with her birth occurring sometime in the 1990s. Several details in the episode point to her being part of a government team rather than a lone vigilante, such as having a headquarters and being warned that her maneuver was "against regulations. We could get in a lot of trouble." The Red Squirrel has several powerful abilities, including some that bear a striking resemblance to those of the Red Panda and the Flying Squirrel. She can fly, has some limited hypnotic powers (only inducing sleep instead of picking apart memories), and has a costume strong enough to deflect bullets. The Red Squirrel is "apparently" the g-g-granddaughter of Kit Baxter and The Red Panda, indicated by her comment "Who do you think put the Red in the Red Squirrel?" Voiced by Denise Anderson.
- Captain Tom Sunlight: A daring, high-flying, presumably American adventurer and ally of the Red Panda. He apparently owes the crimefighter a favor and attempted to kill Professor Von Schlitz at the Red Panda's request, although it was later revealed that this attempt failed. Largely regarded as a nod to Captain Midnight. Voiced by Christopher Mott.
- Colonel Archibald FitzRoy: A career espionage agent put in charge of forming and managing the Home team. Killed in "There Will Be Rain Tonight".
- "Captain": A mysterious, nameless woman that took command of the Home Team when FitzRoy was killed, In "From the Ashes", it´s revealed to have been given the rank of Major.
- Wentworth James/Doc. Rocket: A millionaire inventor that become Doc. Rocket after a run-in with the Genie. Member of the Home Team. Voiced by Steven Burley.
- John Archer/John Doe: An automaton created by Captain Clockwork that imprinted itself on a woman and took on a personality bent on doing good. His wife was killed in an explosion and he was badly injured in "There Will Be Rain Tonight". Assumes the role of the Red Panda in "From the Ashes", to keep moral up and to get revenge for the murder of his wife. Voiced by Christopher Mott.
- Prof. Maximillion "Molecule Max" Wisemen: A Jewish American Superhero that helped the Canadians before the US joined the war. His superpower is the ability to rearrange particles so that a person or object appears bigger or smaller. Killed in "There Will Be Rain Tonight".
- Dark Angel: Member of the Home Team. Killed in "There Will Be Rain Tonight".
- Green Guardian: Member of the Home Team. Killed in "There Will Be Rain Tonight".
- The Danger Federation: A young group of heroes set up in place of the Home Team under the guidance of the Red Panda.
  - Eagle Man: Member of the Danger Federation.
  - Jenny Swift: Member of the Danger Federation. Her power is super-speed.
  - Titanic Man: Member of the Danger Federation.
  - Blue Bomber: Member of the Danger Federation. His super-heroics are sponsored by the Winnipeg Blue Bombers football team.
  - Doctor Improbable: Member of the Danger Federation.
  - Molecule Max II: Member of the Danger Federation. A research assistant to Professor Wiseman, he was injured in the explosion that killed the original Molecule Max. As a tribute to his mentor, he carries on under the Molecule Max guise.
  - Mr. Amazing: Member of the Danger Federation. He set out to destroy the Danger Federation and prove himself to be the superior hero. After he was defeated by the Red Panda, he was voted in as a member of the team.
  - Mystic: Member of the Danger Federation.
  - White Knight: Android member of the Danger Federation.
  - Star Lass: Member of the Danger Federation. Last surviving member of a lost alien civilization.
  - Grey Fox: Member of the Danger Federation at the request of the Flying Squirrel. Grey Fox is a Japanese-Canadian heroine who was first encountered by the Flying Squirrel during a trip to Vancouver. She was detained in an internment camp due to her Japanese ancestry until the Danger Federation arranged her release. Voiced by Andrea Lyons.

==== The Forces of Evil ====
- The Sphinx: Mike Murtoch, a master safe-cracker turned teleporting cat burglar with the supernatural aid of an ancient Egyptian amulet and a pair of mystic sapphires. He also bore the powerful Ankh of Sutek, which has the ability to instantly mummify any living flesh it touches. Voiced by M. John Kennedy.
- Professor Zombie: Antonia Zombanistro, a scientist, necromancer and inventor of the chemical Necronium 234, which has the power to turn people into zombies. In the banter between Professor Zombie and the Red Panda in "Night Patrol" it is hinted that they might have had a more complicated relationship in the past. Voiced by Andrea Lyons.
- Jackrabbit: Thief, murderer and speedster all rolled into one. Though the details of her past are somewhat sketchy, it is known that she was an unusually fast circus performer whose speed was further enhanced by the beneficence of the fallen socialite Peter Urskin. Her character has gained depth of late when it was revealed in "The Terrible Two" that she was in love with the Mad Monkey in a villainous mirror image of the relationship between Kit Baxter and the Red Panda. Voiced by Julie Florio.
- The Golden Claw: A criminal mastermind who managed to merge most of the gangs in Toronto under her control. She was expanding into the protection market when she was stopped by the Red Panda and sent to jail. Even in prison, she still had influence, as was evidenced by her scheme to discredit the Red Panda in "Red Panda: Dead or Alive". She later escaped from prison, only to reappear wearing a stolen body gained through dark magic. At last mention, she was one of the criminals captured in the heroic double-cross at the end of "The Hidden Door." Voiced by Shannon Arnold (original body) and Monica Coté ('Margret Horace' body).
- Commander Varkin: European "Ghost Ship" Captain with ties to a mysterious organization with a "great cause" and desire to "bring justice to the whole world". It is suggested in the end of "Barton's Charm" that this mysterious organization was in fact the malevolent Syndicate in a different guise. Voiced by Gregory Z. Cooke.
- Nick Diablos: A master hypnotist and manipulator. He would meet promising individuals in different fields and use his powers to convince them that he was the Devil. He promised that if they would sign a contract in blood, he would use his malevolent might to give them all the power they could grab. Once they agreed, he implanted a post-hypnotic suggestion to make them believe that he was the source of their success, when in fact it was their own abilities that got them where they were. For years he sat in the shadows like a spider on a web, collecting the money, favors, and power from his "clients". There was one flaw in his plan, however. The post-hypnotic suggestions could not last forever, and after twenty-two years the effects had begun to fade. Suddenly, his "clients" realized that Diablos and his powers were fake and they stopped paying. He soon struck back at those who had betrayed him, using his hypnotic powers to lock them into a catatonic state where they were haunted by their mind's greatest fears. Despite his incredible hypnotic skill, he was no match for the mind-altering might of the Red Panda and was soon locked in a catatonic nightmare of his own. At last mention he was incarcerated at the Queen Street Lunatic Sanitarium for the Criminally Deranged. Voiced by Gregory Z. Cooke.
- Mordriel the Malevolent: A Faustian user of dark magic bound to shadow. He is obsessed with the quest to retrieve the eight fragments of an ancient artifact. Its completion would free him from the ancient agreement that bound him to the shadow in the first place while keeping his powers intact. Temporarily banished to another realm by long-time enemy The Stranger, he later reappeared as Mordoc, a mysterious shopkeeper bearing cursed trinkets, in "Barton's Charm". It is eventually revealed that he is another supervillain in the employ of the shadowy Syndicate in their grand scheme of dominance. At last mention he had been taken into custody by the Council of Mages. Voiced by Steven Burley.
- The Mad Monkey: Insane simian-themed lunatic and self-proclaimed nemesis of the Red Panda. He possesses the limited mental ability to communicate with baboons. His name was originally Anton Creswell. He was a representative for a trading company dealing in Africa when his plane went down, leaving him the only survivor. In the six years before he was rescued he lived with the baboons of the Savannah. Afterwards, he claimed the ability to speak to them. He was quite a hit on the lecture circuit for a while, until other "Wild Men", like the orphaned English lord who could talk to apes, drew attention away from him. He was quickly forgotten. He then disappeared for years before reappearing as the Mad Monkey. Creswell was originally a sane man, but his powers involved more than just mind-control over the baboons. He can actually hear the thoughts of baboons. He hears them all the time, all their anger, all their rage at captivity. He becomes the nexus of the hive, gives them focus and civilizes them. However, he can never escape the draw of their more...basic instincts. This relentless mental assault rendered him completely insane. Recently, it has been revealed that his powers have grown and he now has the ability to control humans by utilizing the vestiges of the primate brain structure that remains in the recesses of the mind. His character deepens further when it is revealed in the end of "The Terrible Two" that he is in love with the villainess Jackrabbit. The romance ended when the Monkey cheated on Jackrabbit with Professor Zombie. Voiced by Christopher Mott.
- The Genie: A supervillain who is terrorizing Toronto at the end of episode 13, "The Hand of Fate". It is later mentioned in episode 20, "Monkeyshines", that he had held Walter Potts captive. He next appeared as a secondary villain in "The Red Squirrel" when he tried to use an electrical disruptor to pull off a daring heist, only to be interrupted by the appearance of the Puppeteer's killbot. His specialties are centered around his (supposed) great intelligence and his many fantastic devices. One of the defining characteristic of the Genie is his incredible arrogance. As the Red Panda put it, "the Genie regards everyone around him as some level of idiot." Voiced by Brian Vaughan.
- The Poet: The Pompous Pirate of the Pen, the Poet is a notorious supervillain who commits crimes with a literary theme. To the Poet, crime is almost an art form. All of the clues he sends to the authorities are carefully and beautifully done, be they hand-bound parchments or billboards that border on murals. He once wrote a 140-stanza ode to the contents of the vault at the main branch of the Empire Bank. He printed copies, had them hand bound, and delivered them to every library in the city two hours before he robbed the place. His poetic skill is unrivaled, and he considers himself a modern-day Shakespeare. As the Red Panda put it, "He's not far wrong. The sonnets he wrote to taunt the authorities in the Moretti kidnapping are still taught at the University as some of the most perfect examples of the form written in a hundred years." To go along with this Shakespearean theme, the Poet is lover of all things English, and even puts on a bad English accent. To quote the Flying Squirrel, "He's an Anglophile, and a complete snob to boot." Though mentioned multiple times, his only actual appearance was as a momentary disruption to the Mad Monkey's plans in "The Terrible Two." He was almost immediately recaptured by the Red Panda. Voiced by Michael Booth.
- Kid Chaos : Super-foe alluded to at least twice in untold adventures. Prior to episode 12, "The Deadliest Game", The Red Panda is said to have traveled back in time with a cadre of heroes to stop him from changing history. He makes his first real appearance in "The Opening Gambit" on the payroll of the sinister Syndicate. It is unknown if he has any superhuman abilities, but he has displayed a fondness for bizarre traps and over-elaborate schemes. His relationship with the Red Panda is possibly a reference to Batman and the Joker. He appeared to have died in the explosion at the end of "The Opening Gambit", but it was noted that Kid Chaos is notoriously difficult to kill and has reappeared four times after being seemingly defeated for good. He returned again in "Operation Cold Feet" attempting to restart his reign of terror by crashing August Fenwick's wedding, only to be foiled by the Red Squirrel. Voiced by Peter Nicol.
- Professor Friedrich von Schlitz: A brilliant German professor and chief scientific officer for the German Reich who may also be heavily involved with preparing new and dangerous weaponry for the growing Nazi war machine. Warnings of his future malevolence were provided to the Red Panda by Baboon McSmoothie. It is left unclear if Von Schlitz would have actually become a villain like his counterpart Von Schlick, leaving the possibility that the theft of his invention in "The World Next Door" sent him down the path of evil. Von Schlitz was behind a plot to steal the American dirigible "Melchior", fill it with explosive gas and explode it over the city of Toronto. Von Schlitz also almost killed the Flying Squirrel in the season three finale; she survived thanks to the anti-magic shield provided by Dr. Chronopolis, but at the time, Von Schlitz thought she was dead. In the opening episode of Season Four, an old ally of the Red Panda flew him into the side of a mountain, which appeared to kill him, only for him to be rediscovered by the Red Panda, the Flying Squirrel, and Tom Sunlight in a mysterious other dimension. The Red Panda stranded him there, but it has recently been revealed that he somehow escaped and is once again in Germany. Voiced by M. John Kennedy and Hans Messersmith.
- Professor Hex: A brilliant, world-traveling professor of entomology named John Erikson who first appears in "The Empty Box". He is driven to crime when the University cuts funding to his research and he strikes back with a devilish plan revolving around a small-time crook and mystical promises of vengeance. Voiced by M. John Kennedy.
- The Rat Lord: A shadowy figure that played upon the fears of children to blackmail them into committing a multitude of small crimes that added up to a huge fortune. He was stopped by the actions of the Red Panda and the newly empowered Harry Kelly, under his new guise as the Black Cap. Voiced by M. John Kennedy.
- The Syndicate: A criminal enterprise dedicated to bringing about a new world order. Their first appearance came in Episode 10, in the form of the paramilitary organization pirating the Great Lakes and led by the foreign Commander Varkin. Along with traditional methods, they have no problem with employing supervillains such as Kid Chaos ("The Opening Gambit") and Mordriel the Malevolent ("Barton's Charm") to further their schemes. Their most recent appearance has been in Season Four in which they attempted to turn the people of Toronto against each other. (Ep. 37 – "The Third Wave".) The full nature of the Syndicate has not yet been revealed, but it is clear that they are very powerful, as evidenced by their ability to find the weakened Mordriel in his exile between dimensions. In more recent episodes, a fascist trend has begun to work into their rhetoric, leading many fans to suspect a Nazi involvement, possibly the beginnings of Archangel.

Former Foes

- Mrs. Mynack: A seemingly harmless candy-shop owner who appeared almost overnight in "The Sweet Tooth". It is soon revealed that her candies were actually laced with addictive, will-weakening chemicals that turned her customers into willing slaves. Instead of being an innocent shopkeeper, Mynack was actually an ancient alchemist seeking eternal life. It appears that her intentions were originally altruistic, but as she approached her own death, she took desperate measures: she began to steal the life force/soul of young women around her to extend her own life. It is unknown how she accomplished this in centuries past, but in the present she used a great machine that drained the life force from her victims and transferred it to her. She was killed when the Red Panda reversed the machine to return the stolen life. Currently, her dried remains lie with Dr. Chronopolis for further study. Voiced by Lesley Livingston.
- Electric Eel: Simon Radford, a brilliant inventor turned supervillain with electrical powers. He had the ability to disrupt electrical devices, stun a man with a touch, and throw a limited number of lightning bolts before he had to recharge. There were two incarnations of the villain, one occurring before the start of the RPA and the other in the episode "Duality." Originally, Radford had been held back from reaching his true power by his own fear and his reluctance to kill. The second phase of his villainy actually came after a period of innocence when he underwent hypnotic treatments with Dr. Cornelius Bygot at the Queen St. Lunatic Sanitarium for the Criminally Deranged. Though it appeared that Radford was cured, it is revealed that instead of fixing Radford, Dr. Bygot only succeeded in splitting Radford's personality into an innocent half and one containing a completely evil Electric Eel. In this second incarnation, he expanded his powers by adapting the Maximillian Gemstones to allow him to shoot beams of raw energy. He was defeated and thought killed during his bid to absorb the awesome power of the Niagara Falls Hydroelectric Dam when the Flying Squirrel destroyed the controls with a boomerang. He later returned in an attempt to trap The Red Panda at the Queen Street Asylum in Trial by Terror. Voiced by Scott Moyle and Steven Burley.
- Legion of the Black Hand: Apocalyptic cult. "12 men of great learning, of great esteem" who sought to subjugate the power of a demon ("The Destroyer") and paid for it with their lives.
- The Destroyer: Summoned by the Legion of the Black Hand, this class-six demonic entity was—with some magical assistance—banished from the mortal realm by the Flying Squirrel.
- Deadly Nightshade: Got away in episode #49 "Nightshade". Assumed control of Archangel´s network and set up the murder of most of the Home Team personnel in their civilian identities (revealed in "From the Ashes").
- Captain Clockwork: Creator of numerous robotic machines of destruction, some humanoid – including John Archer/John Doe – and some not. Mentioned several times throughout the series, he was the featured villain of the novel, The Android Assassins. Captain Clockwork was kidnapped by the Nazis and forced to work on robotic planes. He finally appeared within the series in episode 80.

Foes Mentioned But Never Seen

- Crime Doctor
- Dr. Darkness
- Lava Lady: Currently serving eight years in Saskatchewan. Unsurprisingly, it has been revealed that she possesses heat powers of some kind.

==== Other Groups and Persons of Interest ====
- The Justice Union: An American team of superheroes working primarily out of New York. They operate out of the belief that the mystery men community needs regulations and order, otherwise they are nothing but dangerous vigilantes. Such a belief lends credence to the possibility that they are a government-sponsored, or at least government-sanctioned, team. Despite their focus on teamwork and cooperation, they have a somewhat contentious relationship with the rest of the superhero community. Not all of the reasons for this have been explained, but it is partly due to actions such as the Kirkhouse Resolution against Alternate Superteams. This led to an embarrassing confrontation in which the Society of Gentlemen Adventurers came out of retirement and, as the Red Panda put it, "handed you your big silly hats."
  - List of Known Members
    - Molecule Max: He was one of the cadre of heroes who went back in time to prevent Kid Chaos from changing history. Voice by Steven Burley.
    - Lady Luck
    - The Ogre
    - Danger Dame: Voice by Julie Cogger.
    - Hope
    - Glory
    - The Huntsman
    - Captain Blaster
    - Tom Tomorrow
- The Society of Gentlemen Adventurers: One of the original groups of Mystery Men. Though most are currently in retirement, the Red Panda tracked them down in order to have them teach him whatever crime fighting skills they possessed.
  - List of Known Members
    - The Stranger: The secret identity of Maxwell Falcone, world-famous stage magician and illusionist. He set out to learn how to use real magic and, against the wishes of the Council of Mages, used his powers to "interfere in the corporeal world"—otherwise known as "fighting crime."
- The Council of Mages: A group of powerful mages. They police magical and otherwise supernatural events.
  - List of Known Members
    - Lady Prian Harcourn: An operative of the council who liaises with the Red Panda and the Flying Squirrel.
- The Chronicle: A popular Toronto newspaper owned by the Red Panda's alter ego. In competition with The Sentinel for readership.
  - List of Known Reporters
    - Tim Pearly: Editor of the Chronicle.
    - Lulu LaLonde: A gossip columnist for the Chronicle that made some provocative claims about the relationship between a wealthy young gad-about and his lady driver. The Flying Squirrel wanted to throw her off a bank tower, but cooler heads prevailed. The Red Panda got his revenge on her when he bought the Chronicle and transferred her to another newspaper in Winnipeg. "It's how rich boys fight."
    - Jack "Petey" Peters: A crime reporter of twenty years experience, Petey is also an agent of the Red Panda. Peters formerly worked at rival paper, The Sentinel.
    - Kit Baxter: The Flying Squirrel's alter ego became a reporter on the paper in season 6.
    - Harry Kelly: Sixteen-year-old Harry Kelly is a cub reporter under the tuteledge of Kit Baxter, whom he believes to be a fellow Agent of the Red Panda.
- The Sentinel: A popular Toronto newspaper in competition with the Chronicle for readership.
  - List of Known Reporters
    - Don Garnett: Garnett made a name for himself writing about the "Midnight Murderer," but fell out of popularity after the execution. He became desperate to regain his space on the front page.
    - Bailey: An agent of the Red Panda.
- The Club Macaw: The upper class gentlemen's club that the Red Panda's alter ego is a member of. Under direction of the mayor, most of the important city officials are members so that he can have meetings without having to leave the club's opulent surroundings.
  - List of Known Members
    - August Fenwick: The Red Panda's alter ego.
    - Issac Feron
    - Police Chief O'Malley
    - Gordon Sinclair
    - Marcus Boyce
- The City Father's Benevolent Society: Officially a charitable foundation, but its main function seems to be an excuse for the rich and powerful of Toronto to throw lavish parties without seeming wasteful.

== Original Universe Red Panda Mini-Series ==
Recorded years earlier, the original Red Panda mini-series was made up of six episodes set during World War II and was the original appearance of the Red Panda character. The name and the character's hypnotic powers are all that remain of the original Red Panda in the current series of podcasts. In episode 24 of The Red Panda Adventures, it was revealed that the world of these stories still exists in an alternate universe from which travel is possible. The original series had a far sillier tone, parodying many tropes of the patriotic superhero radio dramas of the 1940s, right down to product placement and appeals to buy war bonds. The lack of punching/kicking sound effects during fight scenes (mostly composed of enraged grunting and cries of agony) in the series unwittingly adds to the hilarity of these episodes.

=== Dramatis Personae ===
- The Red Panda: Referred to as "Canada's One-Man Second Front," he was a superhero in Toronto before World War II broke out, and along with the other "mystery men" of Canada, he has pledged to use his talents to aid the war effort. From time to time, Red downs a gulp of Manlonite 990 for a temporary boost in strength and speed.
- Baboon McSmoothie: "The Man of a Thousand Faces", McSmoothie is a former international jewel thief and current Australian secret agent. By taking a drug called "Adaptrinol T-13", he is able to change his features into any form he chooses. This is the same McSmoothie who appears in Episode 24 of the current Red Panda Adventures (see above).
- Colonel Sparky Fitzking: Once the pet of Prime Minister William Lyon Mackenzie King, Colonel Sparky Fitzking is a Golden Retriever who has undergone intelligence treatments that have given him the ability to talk. These treatments increased his natural canine intellect by a factor of 6000³. He essentially runs the government while the Prime Minister is indisposed.
- William Lyon Mackenzie King: The Prime Minister of Canada, "Willy" was hit with a prototype German insanity ray, reducing his intelligence to that of a five-year-old. The government hides his mental deficiencies in an attempt to convince the Germans the ray doesn't work, by having Colonel Fitzking fulfill the Prime Minister's duties.
- The Major: The Major, whose proper name is never given, is the leader of Special Ops and the Panda Division. Her own past is somewhat shady, and she has no compunctions about using any methods at her disposal to get what she wants. She has a known past with Baboon McSmoothie
- Dr. Anna Handbasket: A scientist for Panda Division. She is the inventor of many of the tools used by the Red Panda, including Manlonite 990, the Zap Gun and the Ventriloquator. She is romantically connected to the Red Panda and is the daughter of Bucky Handbasket, the Grey Panda.
- The Green Panda: Thomas McStrongchin. Formerly the Green Guardian of Winnipeg and a member of the Prairie Patrol, this agent of Panda Division was decommissioned by The Major as a security risk after she tested his discretion through a false romantic relationship with him.
- The Grey Panda: Bucky Handbasket. Father to Anna Handbasket and retired agent of Panda Division in the last war. Last seen searching for The Black Panda.
- The Black Panda: Victor Boysenberry. Hoping to prove himself to his mentor, the Grey Panda, and the woman he loved, Dr. Anna Handbasket, Victor took an earlier, unstable version of the Manlonite formula that not only enhanced his strength and speed but also horribly disfigured him. Burning him from the inside out with an unending supply of energy, Victor learned he could use the energy as a weapon by projecting it in a simultaneous burst from his eyes, mouth and hands. Wracked with pain and thought dead, Victor fell to despair until eventually joining forces with Professor Von Schlick. Victor ultimately redeemed himself by turning his energy powers on Von Schlick in order to save the Grey Panda and Anna Handbasket.
- The Purple Panda: Killed In Action by Professor Von Schlick.
- Professor Friedrich Von Schlick: Nazi scientist turned into a living oil slick.
- The Flying Squirrel: Kent Baxter, a 15-year-old sidekick of the Red Panda who disappeared under mysterious circumstances. He is not mentioned by name in the original series, only referred to as a "teen sidekick". His name is revealed in the podcast/original series crossover.
- Dorothy Dynamite: Dorothea McCocoa, owner of "Dorothea Chocolate International", she is a lunatic with a penchant for dynamite and an unrequited love for Benito Mussolini.
- Professor Kelp: Owns an underwater grotto visited by the Red Panda.
- Dr. Chronopolis: An armored super-villain, not actually appearing in the original six episodes, but referred to in the podcast/original series crossover.
- Baron Otto Pilate: Scourge of the Skies and Pride of the Luftwaffe, the original Baron is presumed dead. An army of Nazi android pilots containing his likeness and personality replaced him.
- Maurice Baguette of the Resistance: French resistance fighter.
- Great Dane: The greatest hero of the Danish resistance, 7 ft 9in, can bench-press a tank, proficient with energy weapons and only speaks Danish.
- The Vancouver Vixen: The former pseudonym of an unidentified Panda Division operative.
- German Von German: Commander of an elite team of Nazi Ninjas.
