= Spooked (Fear Itself) =

- Fear Itself episode
- Harry re-experiencing an event from his youth.
- Episode no.: Season 1 Episode 2
- Directed by: Brad Anderson
- Written by: Mick Garris; Matt Venne
- Original air date: June 12, 2008

Guest appearances
- Eric Roberts; Larry Gilliard Jr.; Cynthia Watros; Jack Noseworthy; Liam James; Jake Church; Tom Edwards

Episode chronology
← Previous "The Sacrifice"	Next → "Family Man"

"Spooked" is the second episode of the NBC horror anthology Fear Itself.

== Plot ==
Eric Roberts plays Harry Siegal, a police detective attempting to locate a kidnapped child. Harry finds Rory, the man he believes is responsible and viciously beats a confession out of him. It soon becomes clear that this is not unusual behavior for Harry; he believes his methods are justified in pursuit of a greater good. Rory begs for his life, especially after Harry cuts his throat. Rory eventually confesses, then faints. Harry locates the boy in a closet. Outside, Rory is being loaded into an ambulance. Harry has no remorse for what he has done to Rory in order to get the confession. Knowing that he will die, Rory warns Harry that he'll never let Harry forget this, before finally dying. Harry is sentenced to 100 hours of community service, is fired from the police force, and loses his pension.

Fifteen years later, Harry is a successful private detective, working with his partner, James (Larry Gilliard Jr.). Harry is approached by a woman named Meredith (Cynthia Watros), who wants Harry to spy on her husband, who she believes is cheating on her. Harry agrees and sets up his equipment in the abandoned building across from Meredith's house, with James monitoring from a surveillance van down the street. As night falls, Harry begins to pick up signs of life in the building: lights coming on, forms moving about, even children watching TV. The problem is that only Harry seems to be able to see these things; James only sees darkness in the house. After another night of the same spooky events—in which Harry claims the house is haunted—James gives up and leaves. Harry goes into the house he has been monitoring, but finds it empty, with 'FOR SALE' signs all over.

In the abandoned building, Harry encounters Rory, who haunts Harry and says he didn't deserve to be killed. Harry has an hallucination: he sees two children watching TV, one of whom shows a gun to his brother, but the gun goes off, killing him. Harry has just relived his childhood, in which he accidentally shot and killed his brother. We then see young Harry and his father burying the boy in their yard, covering up the incident.

An enraged Harry flashes back to the present, and surmises that Meredith must have set this up. He confronts Meredith—who reveals that Rory was her brother; the whole affair was their revenge against Harry. She aims her gun at Harry, who takes it and aims it at her. Meredith begs Harry to kill her. But Harry says that he is truly sorry for his actions over the years, and resolves to start over. James then bursts into the room. Meredith screams "Help me!" and James accidentally shoots Harry. James protests that it was an accident, while Harry dies, finally at peace.

== Reception ==
Horror outlets Dread Central and Bloody Disgusting both panned the episode, both criticizing it as predictable, an opinion shared by the reviewer for Slant. The A. V. Club noted that the episode was better than the prior one, but that while Roberts's acting made the first act of "Spooked" entertaining it all led to "a howler of an ending that was telegraphed from Gilliard’s first appearance on screen." The reviewer for Den of Geek was more favorable, writing that "While still not brilliant (I could see the ending coming from a mile away), this was a big step up in terms of scare level and bloodshed level from last week’s debut nod."
