= Pretend You Don't See Her =

- Based on: Pretend You Don't See Her by Mary Higgins Clark
- Screenplay by: Donald Hounam
- Directed by: René Bonnière
- Starring: Emma Samms; Hannes Jaenicke; Beau Starr; Reiner Schöne; Kim Poirier
- Music by: Domenic Troiano
- Countries of origin: Canada; United Kingdom; United States
- Original language: English

Production
- Producers: Justin Bodle; Lisa Parasyn
- Cinematography: Richard Wincenty
- Editor: Robert K. Sprogis
- Running time: 91 minutes
- Production company: Lion's Gate Productions

Original release
- Release: 12 January 2002

Pretend You Don't See Her is a 2002 television film directed by René Bonnière and starring Emma Samms, Hannes Jaenicke, Beau Starr, Reiner Schöne, and Kim Poirier. It is based on the novel by Mary Higgins Clark.

== Plot summary ==
Lacey Farrell (Emma Samms), a young rising star on Manhattan's high-powered and competitive real estate scene is in the course of selling a luxurious apartment when she becomes the witness to a murder and hears the dying words of the victim, a woman convinced that her attacker was after a journal kept by her recently deceased daughter Heather up until the day she died in a hit-and-run, what everyone believes to be a tragic accident.

== Cast ==
- Emma Samms as Lacey Farrell
- Hannes Jaenicke as Savarano / Curtis Caldwell
- Beau Starr as Detective Ed Sloan
- Reiner Schöne as Jimmy Greco
- Stewart Bick as Ken Lynch
- Laura Press as Chantal Greco
- Carolyn Dunn as Kitt Taylor
- Fulvio Cecere as Baldwin
- Richard Eden as Steve Smith
- Philip Akin as Witness Protection Agent
- Rod Wilson as Jay Taylor
- William Colgate as Svenson
- Tom Melissis as Ron Parker
- Danielle Bouffard as Bonnie Taylor
- Lyriq Bent as Detective
- Kim Poirier as Heather Greco
