= Kim Poirier =

Canadian actress

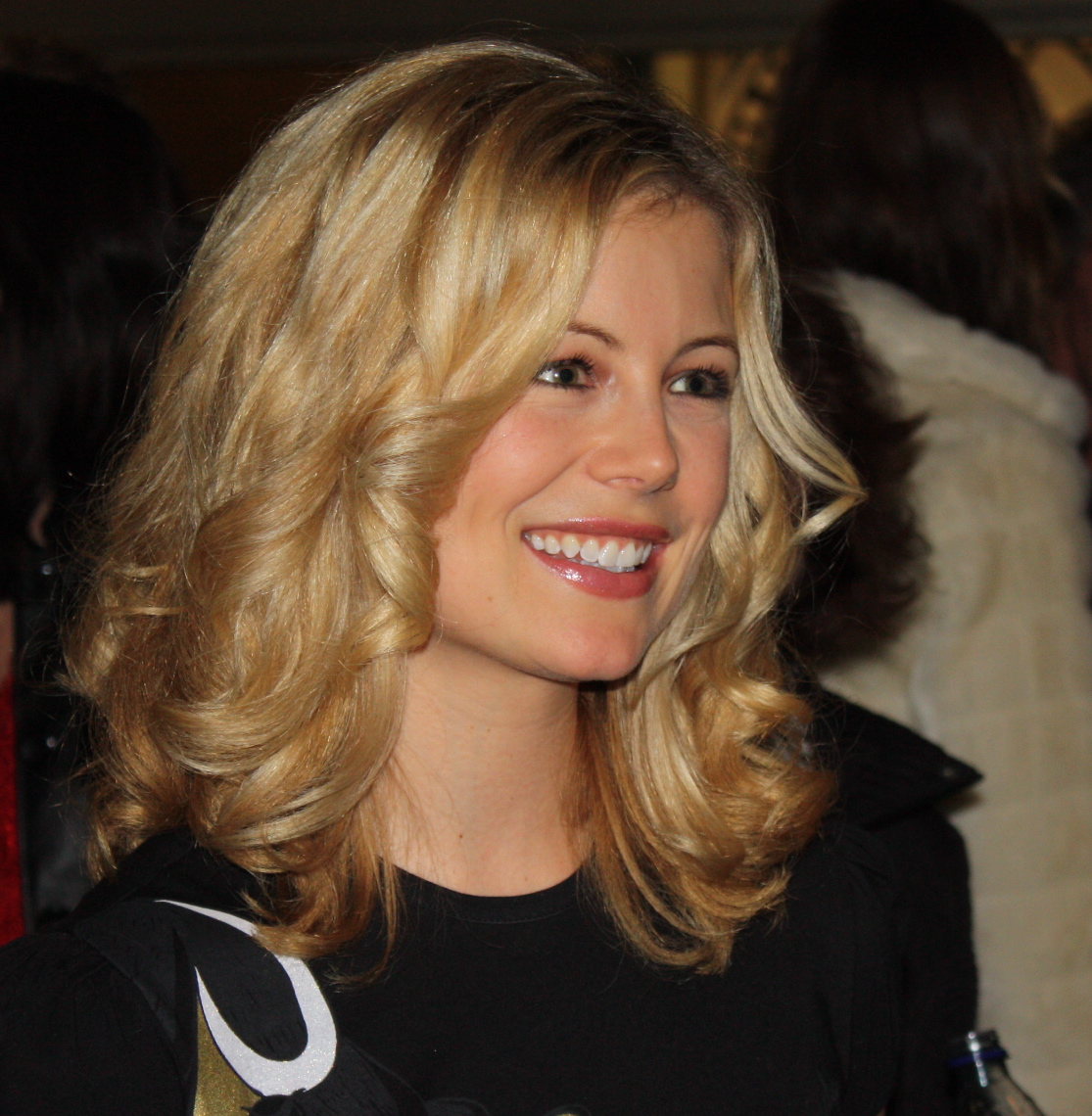
- Poirier in 2010
- Born: Drummondville, Quebec, Canada
- Occupations: Actress, television presenter, singer, film producer, yoga teacher, dancer, model
- Years active: 1996–present
- Spouse: Alex Saunders (m. 2016)
- Children: 2

Kim Poirier is a Canadian actress, singer, film producer, and television host.

== Biography ==
=== Personal life ===
Poirier is fluent in both French and English.

Professionally trained in yoga, she has studied numerology, healing, and nutrition.

== Filmography ==
Film
Year	Title	Role	Notes
2002	American Psycho 2	Barbara	Video
2004	Decoys	Constance Snowden	
2004	Dawn of the Dead	Monica	
2005	The Archer	Lisa	Short film
2007	Decoys 2: Alien Seduction	Constance Snowden	Video
2007	How I Married My High School Crush	Kate Duncan	TV movie
2010	Foodland	Lucy Eklund	
2011	Silent But Deadly	Sandra Gibson	
2012	Awaken	Christine	
2013	Hollywood's Insider Secrets: Horror Techniques and Special FX	Zombie Hunter	Video
2013	No Ordinary Hero: The SuperDeafy Movie	Erica	
2013	M is for Milf	Milf	Short film
2014	The Program	Jessica	Short film
2014	Emily Stone	Emily Stone	Book Trailer - Short Film
2015	No Solicitors	Nicole Cutterman	

Television
Year	Title	Role	Notes
1996	Psi Factor: Chronicles of the Paranormal	Marisa	Episode: "The Underneath/Phantom Limb"
1998	Straight Up	AJ's Gang Member	Episode: "Gravity"
1998	Naked City: Justice with a Bullet	Young Lover 1	TV movie
1999	The Hunt for the Unicorn Killer	Affair Girl (uncredited/scenes deleted)	TV movie
2000	A Bachelor's Guide to Seduction in the Kitchen	Linda	TV movie
2000	Rated X	Jamie the 'Actress'	TV movie
2000	The Gavin Crawford Show	Jenna	Episode: "Culture Club"
2000	Twice in a Lifetime	Amanda Harmony	Episode: "The Night Before Christmas"
2001	Danger Beneath the Sea	Lisa Alford	TV movie
2001–2008	Paradise Falls	Roxy Hunter	103 episodes
2002	Pretend You Don't See Her	Heather Greco	TV movie
2002	Undressed	Holly	4 episodes
2002	The Rats	Jay	TV movie
2002	Doc	Denise	Episode: "Second Time Around"
2002	Puppets Who Kill	Evelyn	Episode: "Dash the Greeter"
2003	I Love Mummy	Young Esther	Episode: "Old Lady"
2003	Largo Winch	Jacqueline Lindley	Episode: "Hot Property"
2004	While I Was Gone	Dana Jablonski	TV movie
2007	The Wedding Wish	Kate Duncan	TV movie
2009	Eureka	Dr. Maria Leonardo	Episode: "Welcome Back, Carter"
2010	Mad Men	Camille	Episode: "Tomorrowland"
2011	Normal	Dr. Landres	TV movie
2011	Eureka	Dr. Maria Leonardo	Episode: "Clash of the Titans"
2011	Silent But Deadly	Sandra	TV movie
2012	The Exes	Tracey	Episode: "Lost in Translation"

== Hosting and own appearances ==
- 2003 Much Music Video Music Awards (2003) as herself
- 1st Annual Spaceys (2003) as herself
- Surviving the Dawn (2004) as herself (uncredited)
- Decoys: Behind the Scenes (2004) as herself
- Open Mike with Mike Bullard (episode dated 1 March 2004) (TV series) as herself
- 05 Spaceys (2005) as herself - On-Air Presenter
- Audioslave Live@Much (2005) as herself (uncredited)
- Breakfast Television (episode dated 26 March 2006) (TV series) as herself
- 06 Spaceys (2006) as herself - On-Air Presenter
- Best! Movies! Ever! (episode Alien Invasions) (2007) (TV series) as herself
- Space Top 10 Countdown (2006) (TV series) as herself - On-Air Presenter (2006–2007)
- The Best of the Spaceys (2007) as herself - On-Air Presenter
- 07 Spaceys (2007) as herself - On-Air Presenter
- Drive-In Classics (2001) (TV series) as herself - On-Air Presenter (2005–2007)
- HypaSpace (2002–2008) (TV series) as herself - On-Air Presenter (2005–2008)
- The Search For The Balanced Life (2008) as herself
- The Circuit (1 episode) (2008) (TV series) as herself
- InnerSpace (1 episode) (2011) (TV series) as herself
- Fashion News Live (1 episode) (2011) as herself
- POP Galaxy (2012) (Web series) as herself - Host
- Hollywood's Insider Secrets: Classic Hollywood Makeup (2013) as herself - Host

== Producer credits ==
- The Gospel of Phi (2007)
- Hollywood's Insider Secrets: Horror Techniques and Special FX (2013)
- Hollywood's Insider Secrets: Classic Hollywood Makeup (2013)
- Hollywood's Insider Secrets: Fun with Face Painting (2013)
- After The Harvest (2014)
- The Jokesters (2014)
- Mad Mex
- 100 Days of Death
- Blue Valley, USA
