= Natasha Eloi =

Canadian TV personality and videographer

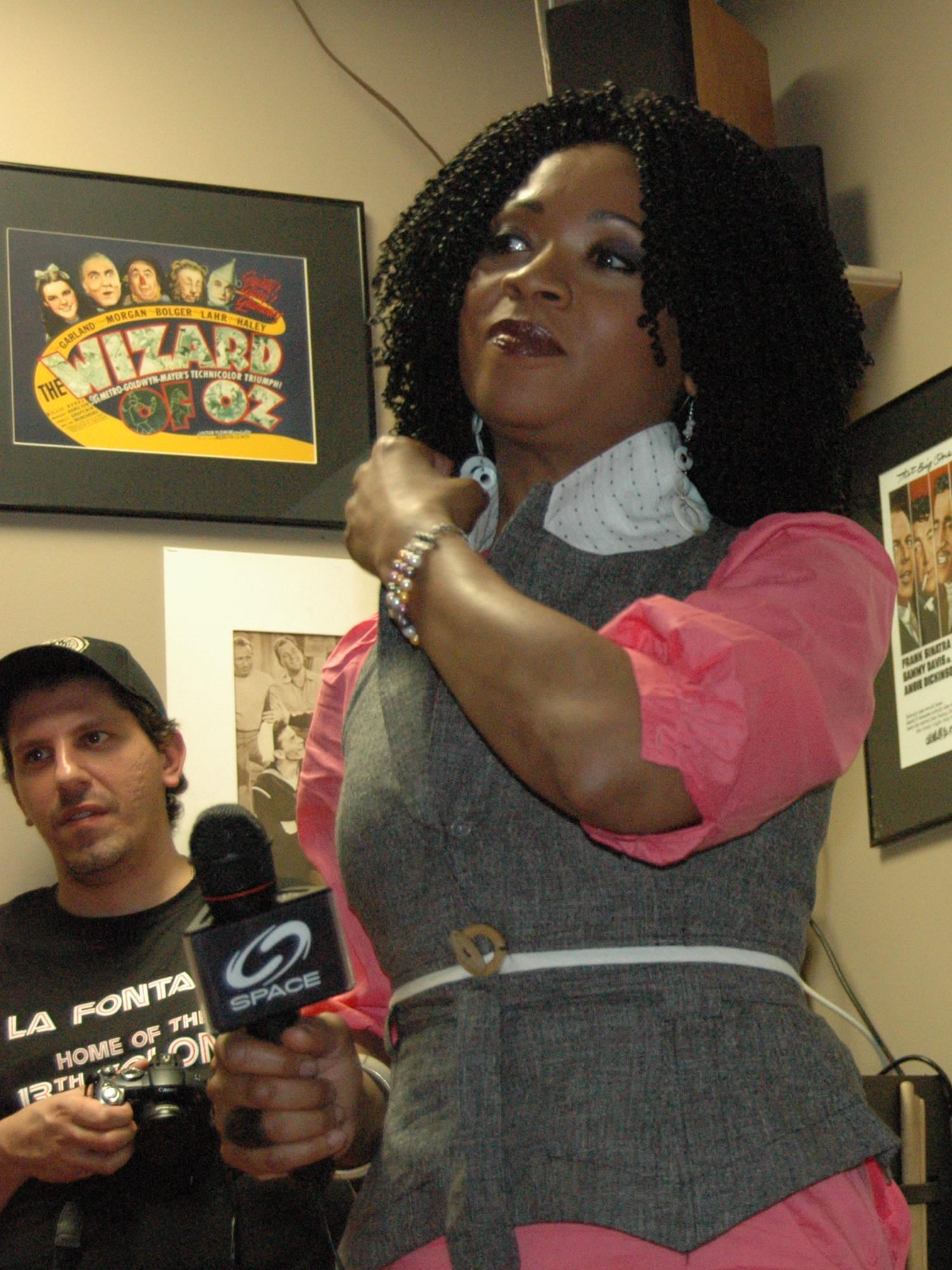
- Natasha Eloi at the Battlestar Galactica finale Vancouver, BC, March 21, 2009
- Born: Hammersmith, England
- Occupation: Broadcaster

Natasha Eloi (born in Hammersmith, England) is a Canadian television personality and videographer. She is most often seen on the Space channel as a space, science and technology reporter and on The Circuit as the resident toy expert. She also hosts a show called It Came From The Basement! where she takes a look at people's collections related to science fiction memorabilia. She was a co-presenter on the 2001: A Space Road Odyssey and the Spacey Awards from 2003 to 2006.

She graduated from Stephen Leacock Collegiate Institute in Toronto.

== TV appearances as herself ==
- June 2000 and August 2001 - TSN's Off The Record
- August 2000 to Present - SFX Convention
- October 2001 - First Wave
- July 2001 - Toronto Star's Best Dressed of 2001
- January 21, 2001 - CTV's Open Mike With Mike Bullard
- September 18–24, 2003 - NOW Magazine 'My Style' Feature
- September 2004 - Women In Media Foundation Commercial

== Awards ==
- September 2000 - Space Frontier Foundation Award for Best Vision of Reality/Best Vision of the Future
