= Ritual (2013 film) =

- Film poster
- Directed by: Mickey Keating
- Written by: Mickey Keating
- Produced by: Eric B. Fleischman; Chelsea Peters
- Starring: Lisa Summerscales; Dean Cates; Brian Lally; Derek Phillips
- Cinematography: Mac Fisken
- Edited by: Valerie Krulfeifer
- Music by: Giona Ostinelli
- Production companies: After Dark Films; EBF Productions; Chelsea Stardust
- Distributed by: Lionsgate Home Entertainment
- Release date: December 31, 2013
- Running time: 85 minutes
- Country: United States
- Language: English

Ritual is a 2013 American horror film written and directed by Mickey Keating. It stars Lisa Summerscales and Dean Cates as a married couple who must deal with a murderous cult. It was released in the United States on December 31, 2013.

== Plot ==
Tom Moses' estranged wife, Lovely, kills a man who tried to kidnap her and calls him for help. Finding a video of a cult sacrifice in the dead man's car, Tom realizes he and his wife are in danger.

== Cast ==
- Lisa Summerscales as Lovely
- Dean Cates as Tom
- Brian Lally as Roman
- Derek Phillips as The Man
- Larry Fessenden as Motel Clerk

== Release ==
Lionsgate Home Entertainment released it in the United States on December 31, 2013.

== Reception ==
Samuel Zimmerman of Fangoria rated it 3/4 stars and wrote, "Being a brisk film, Ritual is one half intimate, indie motel dilemma/one half violent pursuit, punctuated by stark oddities in aesthetic and sound design throughout." Patrick Cooper of Bloody Disgusting rated it 2/5 stars and, though he complimented the score and acting, said the film comes off as "an uninspired attempt at tapping into David Lynch's style". In comparing it negatively to Vacancy, Rohit Rao of DVD Talk rated it 2/5 stars and called it "an odd little thriller that hardly ever thrills".
