= The Last Exorcism Part II =

- Theatrical release poster
- Directed by: Ed Gass-Donnelly
- Screenplay by: Damien Chazelle; Ed Gass-Donnelly
- Story by: Damien Chazelle
- Based on: Characters by Huck Botko and Andrew Gurland
- Produced by: Eric Newman; Eli Roth; Marc Abraham; Thomas A. Bliss
- Starring: Ashley Bell; Julia Garner; Spencer Treat Clark; Louis Herthum
- Cinematography: Brendan Steacy
- Edited by: Ed Gass-Donnelly
- Music by: Michael Wandmacher
- Production companies: Arcade Pictures; Strike Entertainment; StudioCanal; Anton Capital Entertainment
- Distributed by: CBS Films
- Release dates: February 28, 2013 (Russia); March 1, 2013 (United States)
- Running time: 88 minutes
- Country: United States
- Language: English
- Budget: $4-5 million
- Box office: $25.4 million

The Last Exorcism Part II is a 2013 American supernatural horror film co-written, edited and directed by Ed Gass-Donnelly. It stars Ashley Bell, Julia Garner, Spencer Treat Clark, and Louis Herthum. It is a sequel to The Last Exorcism, and was released on March 1, 2013. The film follows Nell Sweetzer as she attempts to recover from her past experiences and start her life anew. Nell then starts to realize that the demon that previously possessed her has come back for her. Unlike its predecessor, it is not presented in a found footage format.

The film received generally negative reviews and grossed $25 million worldwide against a $5 million budget.

== Plot ==
A couple, Jared and Lily, finds a demonic-looking Nell Sweetzer squatting next to their refrigerator. She soon is taken to a hospital, where she appears to be catatonic. After spending a few months at the insightful and caring therapist Frank's home for girls in New Orleans and settling in as a chambermaid at a hotel under the supervision of her boss Beverly, Nell's condition seems to have improved and she no longer has "bad dreams". Nell and her group of friends Gwen, Daphne, and Monique attend a Mardi Gras parade; Nell witnesses many strange happenings there, including masked men watching her. Her personality changes as things get darker. She begins to get hints that the demon Abalam is back.

When Stephanie, one of the girls at the house, dies of an unnatural seizure, Cecile, Nell's former nurse, informs her of the Order of the Right Hand, a secret society which has been monitoring Nell. Nell's friends Gwen, Daphne, Monique, and Michelle discover a video on YouTube which depicts the events from the previous film revealing that the lost footage has been discovered; this frightens and angers Nell as she becomes a reluctant internet celebrity because of the video. Chris, another worker at the hotel who likes Nell, slits his own throat after viewing a clip from the same footage which depicts Nell lying about how she got pregnant. Cecile seeks help from the Order of the Right Hand, and Nell is introduced to Calder and Jeffrey. They attempt to rid the demon which is "in love" with Nell by transferring it into the body of a sacrificed chicken. The supernatural force in Nell proves to be too powerful, and Calder is forced to kill her by injecting her with a lethal dose of morphine.

The demon appears in front of Nell, taking her appearance as a doppelganger, her father, and Chris, and begs her to accept its hand. Nell's pulse stops temporarily and leads Calder, Jeffrey, and Cecile, to believe that she has died. She finally gives in and grabs the demon's hand; the house is left to burn with the three secret society members being killed. Nell murders Frank and burns the home for girls, leaving her friends to die. Nell gets inside a car and the prophecy of end times is proven to be correct as she sets multiple buildings and vehicles aflame while driving past them.

== Cast ==
- Ashley Bell as Nell Margaret Sweetzer
- Julia Garner as Gwen
- Spencer Treat Clark as Chris
- David Jensen as Calder
- Tarra Riggs as Cecile
- Louis Herthum as Louis Sweetzer
- Boyana Balta as Lily
- Muse Watson as Frank Merle
- Erica Michelle as Daphne
- Sharice Angelle Williams as Monique
- Joe Chrest as Pastor
- Raeden Greer as Stephanie
- Judd Lormand as Jared
- E. Roger Mitchell as Jeffrey
- Steven Dane Rhodes as Drunken Tourist
- Ashlynn Ross as Michelle
- Andrew Sensenig as Doctor
- Diva Tyler as Beverly
- Marcellus Grace as Janitor
- Deacon John Moore as Old Bluesman
- Gideon Hodge as Tin Man
- Cristina Franco as Marie

== Production ==
=== Development ===
On August 23, 2011, The Hollywood Reporter announced that a sequel was in development. On April 20, 2012, an audition sheet revealed the film's original title was supposed to be Beginning of the End: The Last Exorcism II. This was shortened to the final title shown on the poster for the theatrical release. Ed Gass-Donnelly was announced to be helming the film as director, with Damien Chazelle (Guy and Madeline on a Park Bench) providing the screenplay. Ashley Bell was later announced to be reprising her role as Nell. On January 2, 2013, the official poster for the film was released, revealing the final title to be The Last Exorcism Part II. The film was also produced by Eli Roth.

=== Filming ===
Production and filming began March 19, 2012 and ended on April 21, 2012. Principal photography mostly took place in New Orleans, Louisiana.

== Release ==
The film received its premiere in Russia on February 28, 2013. The film was released on March 1, 2013 in its U.S. premiere. The film was not released theatrically in Sweden or Australia; the film was released direct-to-video on July 3, 2013 in Sweden and July 31, 2013 in Australia. The film was originally given an R rating by the MPAA but cuts were made to the finished product to receive a watered-down PG-13 rating (all deleted footage was restored in the unrated edition of the film).

=== Home media ===
The film was released on DVD and Blu-ray on June 18, 2013. The Blu-ray disc only contains the unrated cut of the film. The unrated version restored approximately 1 minute of footage deleted from the theatrical cut which extended the length of certain scenes by a few seconds and depicted a more graphic version of the scene where Chris commits suicide.

== Reception ==
=== Box office ===
In its opening weekend The Last Exorcism Part II grossed $7,728,354. Domestically the film grossed $15,161,327 and $9,872,563 internationally grossing a total of $25,051,865 and surpassing its budget by over 20 million, but being a box office failure compared to the previous film's $67,738,090 gross to a $1.8 million budget.

=== Critical reception ===
The film was not screened in advance for critics and audiences, and was extremely panned. Review aggregation website Rotten Tomatoes gives the film a score of 16% based on reviews from 70 critics, with an average score of 3.58/10. The critic consensus states: "The Last Exorcism Part II ditches the found footage format for relatively earnest but deadly tedious psychological terror that devolves into hokum anyways." Metacritic, which uses a weighted average, assigned the film a score of 35 out of 100, based on 20 critics, indicating "generally unfavorable" reviews.

Frank Scheck of The Hollywood Reporter wrote that The Last Exorcism Part II was an "unimpressive follow-up [to The Last Exorcism]", though praising Ashley Bell's "[...] memorable, unsettling performance that easily can be compared to Sissy Spacek's Carrie". Christopher Runyon of Movie Mezzanine also gave a negative review stating "Not a single aspect of this film suggests that anyone involved in the production cared".

Mark Olsen of the Los Angeles Times gave a positive review stating "The Last Exorcism Part II is an effectively unnerving, slow-burn supernatural horror tale".

== Cancelled sequel ==
In light of the film's box office success, a third film had been planned, with Ashley Bell set to reprise her role. In an interview with Bloody Disgusting, she said: “There’s a wait and see approach, but yeah there have been [discussions]. There’s a twist at the end [of Part 2] that is literally so shocking! I would love to step back into my Doc Martens for a third time.”

Though this film had left room for a potential third film, it never materialized.
