= The Last Exorcism =

- Theatrical Release Poster
- Directed by: Daniel Stamm
- Written by: Huck Botko; Andrew Gurland
- Produced by: Eric Newman; Eli Roth; Marc Abraham; Thomas A. Bliss
- Starring: Patrick Fabian; Ashley Bell
- Cinematography: Zoltan Honti
- Edited by: Shilpa Sahi
- Music by: Nathan Barr
- Production companies: Strike Entertainment; StudioCanal; Arcade Pictures
- Distributed by: Lionsgate
- Release dates: June 24, 2010 (Los Angeles Film Festival); August 27, 2010
- Running time: 87 minutes
- Country: United States
- Language: English
- Budget: $1.8 million
- Box office: $70.2 million

The Last Exorcism is a 2010 American found footage supernatural horror film directed by Daniel Stamm. It stars Patrick Fabian, Ashley Bell, Iris Bahr, Caleb Landry Jones, and Louis Herthum.

The film tells the story of a disillusioned evangelical minister who, after years of performing exorcisms, decides to participate in a documentary chronicling his last exorcism while exposing the fraud of his ministry. After receiving a letter from a farmer asking for help in driving out the devil, he meets the farmer's afflicted daughter. The film received positive reviews from critics and was a box office success, grossing more than $70 million against a $1.8 million budget.

A sequel, The Last Exorcism Part II, was released on March 1, 2013.

== Plot ==
Filmmakers Iris and Daniel document Cotton Marcus, a reverend living in Baton Rouge, Louisiana, who seeks to delegitimize exorcisms. Marcus, who lost his faith after the birth of his disabled son, is accustomed to performing fake exorcisms on individuals who believe they are possessed. He accepts an exorcism request sent by Louis Sweetzer, a farmer who suspects his daughter Nell is possessed by Satan.

Marcus claims that Nell is possessed by Abalam, a powerful demon who defiles the innocent. Conducting the phony exorcism, he convinces her family that he has driven out the demon and leaves, believing he has cured her of a mental state that was misdiagnosed as possession. That night, Nell inexplicably appears in Marcus' motel room, visibly unwell. He takes Nell to the hospital, where it is concluded that she is in perfect physical condition. He visits Louis's former pastor, Joseph Manley, who tells him that he hasn't seen Nell in 3 years. Louis takes Nell home but chains her to the bed after she cuts her brother Caleb's face with a knife.

Marcus frees Nell, and the hospital calls back to inform that she is pregnant. That night, Nell brutally smashes a cat to death in the barn. Iris and Daniel discover her morbid paintings, which depict Marcus before a large flame with a crucifix followed by him burning to death, Iris dismembered, and Daniel decapitated. Louis insists that Nell is a virgin and has been impregnated by the demon. Offended at Marcus's insistence that a demon is not involved, he demands that the crew leave and alludes to intending to kill Nell. The crew tries to escape with Nell, who attacks Marcus. Marcus offers to attempt a second exorcism as Nell begs her father to kill her.

During the exorcism, Nell manifests into "Abalam" and asks Marcus if he wants a "blowing job.” Marcus challenges that a demon would know the actual name of the sex act and concludes that Nell is not possessed, but a disturbed girl. Nell anguishes over losing her virginity to a boy named Logan, which Louis rejects. The crew meets Logan, who explains that he is gay and only had a brief conversation with Nell during a party at Manley's house 6 months prior; They realize Manley was lying about having not seen Nell and return to the Sweetzer farmhouse, which they find empty and covered with occult and countercultural symbols on its walls.

In the woods, the group sees a fire and a congregation of hooded cultists led by Manley. Louis is bound, gagged, and blindfolded while hooded figures pray around an altar, atop which Nell is bound. She gives birth to an inhuman child. Manley throws the child into the fire, which causes the fire to grow as demonic roars emanate. Marcus, his faith restored, grabs his cross and rushes toward the fire to combat the evil. Iris and Daniel flee; Iris is killed with an axe by a member of the congregation, while Caleb decapitates Daniel.

== Cast ==
- Patrick Fabian as Cotton Marcus
- Ashley Bell as Nell Margaret Sweetzer
- Iris Bahr as Iris Reisen
- Louis Herthum as Louis Sweetzer
- Caleb Landry Jones as Caleb Sweetzer
- Tony Bentley as Pastor Joseph Manley
- Shanna Forrestall as Shanna Marcus
- Becky Fly as Becky Davis
- Denise Lee as Nurse
- Logan Craig Reid as Logan Winters
- Adam Grimes as Daniel Moskowitz
- Jamie Alyson Caudle as Satanic Worshipper
- Allen Boudreaux as Satanic Worshipper

== Release ==
The film was slated to be part of the 2010 SXSW Film Festival. On February 12, 2010, Lionsgate purchased the rights for the US distribution and pulled the film from the festival. The film's release was set for August 27, 2010.

The film had its world premiere at the LA Film Festival on June 24, 2010 and was here introduced by Eli Roth and Daniel Stamm. Members of the cast were also introduced on stage: Patrick Fabian, Ashley Bell, Louis Herthum, Caleb Landry Jones, Iris Bahr, and Tony Bentley. The Last Exorcism was the last screened film on August 30, 2010, on the Film4 FrightFest 2010.

Bloody Disgusting hosted the screening at the 2010 San Diego Comic-Con; The second screening on 24 July 2010 is narrated by Eli Roth.

=== Poster controversy ===
In the UK, a poster image for the film, which showed a young girl, wearing a blood-spattered dress, bent over backwards below a crucifix, received dozens of complaints that it was "offensive", "distressing", and "unsuitable for public viewing". Two people claimed the girl in the poster seemed to have suffered sexual assault, a complaint which was not upheld. The Advertising Standards Agency decided that the image could not be used on a publicly visible poster, as it was an untargeted medium. Still, it was acceptable on the back cover of Cineworld magazine.

=== Viral campaign ===
The Last Exorcism used Chatroulette as the medium for its viral campaign, featuring a girl who pretends to unbutton her top seductively, then stops and transforms into a monster. At the end, the URL of the film's official website is flashed on screen.

=== Home media ===
The Last Exorcism was released on DVD and Blu-ray on January 4, 2011. The Blu-ray includes the DVD of the film and a digital copy as well.

== Reception ==
=== Critical reception ===
The Last Exorcism has received generally positive reviews from critics, garnering a 71% approval rating on review aggregator Rotten Tomatoes based on 161 reviews and an average rating of 6.17/10. The site's consensus being "It doesn't fully deliver on the chilly promise of its Blair Witch-style premise, but The Last Exorcism offers a surprising number of clever thrills." The film received a 63 out of 100 on Metacritic, indicating "generally favorable reviews". At Yahoo! Movies the film holds a B− based on twelve reviews.

Jeannette Catsoulis of The New York Times gave the film 4 out of 5 stars and wrote that the film was "An unusually restrained and genuinely eerie little movie perched at the intersection of faith, folklore and female puberty." On the other hand, Joe Neumaier of New York Daily News gave the film 1 out of 5 stars and wrote, "Some of Bell's contortionist tricks aren't nearly as frightening as the best moments in Paranormal Activity. Or, really, some of the better episodes of Scooby-Doo."

=== Box office ===
The Last Exorcism opened at #2 at the U.S. box office the weekend of August 27, 2010, behind Takers. It grossed $20,366,613 from 2,874 theaters in its first three days. The Last Exorcism had a budget of $1.8 million. The film remained in the top five, falling to number four in its second weekend. The film went on to gross $41 million domestically and $26.7 million foreign to total $67.7 million worldwide.

=== Awards and nominations ===
Year	Award	Category	Recipient	Result
2011	People's Choice Award	Favorite Horror Movie		Nominated
2011	Independent Spirit Award	Best First Feature	Daniel Stamm	Nominated
2011	Independent Spirit Award	Best Supporting Female	Ashley Bell	Nominated
2011	MTV Movie Award	Best Scared-As-Shit Performance	Ashley Bell	Nominated
2011	Empire Awards	Best Horror	—N/a	Won

== Sequel ==
On August 23, 2011, The Hollywood Reporter announced that a sequel was in the works. On April 20, 2012, an audition sheet revealed the film's full title as Beginning of the End: The Last Exorcism II. The film was directed by Ed Gass-Donnelly, with Damien Chazelle (Guy and Madeline on a Park Bench) providing the screenplay. Ashley Bell reprises her role as Nell. On January 2, 2013, the poster for the film was released, revealing the final title to be The Last Exorcism Part II. The film was also produced by Eli Roth.
