= Pod (film) =

- Directed by: Mickey Keating
- Written by: Mickey Keating
- Produced by: Morgan White; William Day Frank; Sean Fowler
- Starring: Lauren Ashley Carter; Dean Cates; Brian Morvant; Larry Fessenden; John Weselcouch
- Cinematography: Mac Fisken
- Edited by: Valerie Krulfeifer
- Music by: Giona Ostinelli
- Production companies: Alexander Groupe; High Window Films; Illium Pictures; Pod Pictures
- Distributed by: Vertical Entertainment
- Release date: March 16, 2015 (SXSW)
- Running time: 78 minutes
- Country: United States
- Language: English

Pod is a 2015 American horror film written and directed by Mickey Keating. It stars Lauren Ashley Carter, Dean Cates, Brian Morvant, Larry Fessenden, and John Weselcouch. Carter and Cates play siblings who stage an intervention for their unstable brother, played by Morvant. As the situation spirals out of control, they begin to wonder if what they had dismissed as their brother's paranoid delusions may be true. Writing was influenced by The Twilight Zone and classic horror films of the 1970s, including the 1978 version of Invasion of the Body Snatchers, which inspired the title. Shooting took place in Maine in winter 2014. It premiered at South by Southwest on March 16, 2015, and was released theatrically on August 28, 2015. Rotten Tomatoes gave the film a 67% approval rating based on six reviews.

== Plot ==
After receiving a warning not to come to their family lake house in Maine, siblings Lyla and Ed stage an intervention for their brother, Martin, a dishonorably discharged veteran who believes the military has experimented on him. When they arrive, they find that he has descended into apparent paranoid psychosis and claims to have trapped a monster in the basement. Martin explains that he found a pod while hunting in the woods and believes it to be part of a government conspiracy to create artificial, inanimate assassins. Martin subsequently pulled several of his teeth to find what he believes is a tracking device. However, since he destroyed it, he can not prove it to his siblings. When Ed demands to see what is in the basement, Martin refuses to let him and reveals infected scratches across his torso, which he says were made by the trapped creature.

Ed, a mental health professional, insists they take Martin back to the VA hospital where he was previously institutionalized after attacking a nurse, though Lyla wants to hear more of Martin's side of the story. Martin overhears Lyla and Ed discuss taking him back to the institution and confronts them with a knife. As they try to talk him down, Martin announces that they are all going to die anyway and slices his throat. As Ed attempts to stop the bleeding, Lyla panics. Ed forces her to go downstairs and call for help, but she discovers Martin has cut the phone's cord. Unknown to them, he has also sabotaged their car. After Martin dies from blood loss, Ed kicks open the barricaded basement door. Lyla begs him not to go down, but Ed says he must check if there is an injured person held captive.

Ed initially finds nothing in the darkness, and when he turns on a light, it blows a fuse. Flipping the power back on reveals a humanoid creature, confirming that Martin had actually been telling the truth. The creature immediately attacks Ed. Ed barely escapes back up to the house. After telling Lyla to flee the house, Ed becomes disoriented as he remembers that Martin said the monster had some kind of hallucinatory venom. He slows down the monster by stabbing it with a syringe that contains a mild sedative he had intended to give Martin, then retrieves Martin's rifle. As the monster recovers and tries to rush him, Ed shoots it. Meanwhile, Lyla discovers the car will not start and runs to a nearby house. After banging on the door to no effect, she stops a passing motorist, identified later as Smith. Smith calmly questions her, says the creature is not a government conspiracy, and kills her with a shot to the head.

Back at the house, Ed deliriously celebrates his victory against the creature, which he has repeatedly struck with the butt of the rifle to make sure it is dead. Ed calls out to Lyla, saying that it is safe to return; hearing this, Smith shoots and kills him. Smith contacts someone on a walkie-talkie and reports that the creature is dead, though he does not know whether there is a nearby colony of them. After giving his coordinates, Smith hears a noise behind him. The creature, still alive, attacks and kills him as he turns around.

== Cast ==
- Lauren Ashley Carter as Lyla
- Dean Cates as Ed
- Brian Morvant as Martin
- Larry Fessenden as Smith
- John Weselcouch as John Boy
- Suyash Pachauri as OTT
- Forrest McClain as The Pod

== Production ==
Writer-director Mickey Keating had worked with several of the cast members prior to Pod, but the roles were not written for them specifically. Keating had interned for Fessenden at Glass Eye Pix while he was in college. In relation to his previous film, Ritual, Keating wanted to make a more accessible film that could be enjoyed by wider audiences besides fans of his first film. The title is a reference to Invasion of the Body Snatchers, but Keating wanted to use it partially as misdirection, as he wanted to play with audience expectations based on the title.

Pod was shot in Round Pond, Maine, in winter 2014. The house used belongs to the stepbrother of William Day Frank, one of the producers. Once Keating heard that the house was available, he was inspired to create a paranoid thriller in the spirit of The Twilight Zone. Besides that, Keating was influenced by paranoid conspiracy thrillers of the 1960s and 1970s; contemporary, dialogue-heavy horror films, like Bug and The Mist; and the costume design of Invasion of the Body Snatchers. Keating said that he approached writing the film as he imagined Robert Altman would, as Altman is one of his favorite directors. One of the themes that he wanted to cover was the danger of performing interventions, and the film shows the results of an intervention that goes poorly. Keating said that the film is about "people having to deal with a circumstance that's far bigger than themselves, before having to face anything that's necessarily genre". Keating enjoyed the freedom of having written his own screenplay, as it allowed him to make changes on the fly when others offered ideas; for example, Morvant came up with the idea to shave his head as a reference to Travis Bickle from Taxi Driver. Keating wanted the first half of the film to be a family drama, and he stressed to the actors that the film should not be focused on the horror elements until later. Keating did not give much direction to Fessenden and let the actor make his own decisions. Fessenden's character was written to be an ambiguous and subtle reference to the men in black UFO conspiracy theory.

== Release ==
Pod premiered at SXSW on March 16, 2015. Vertical Entertainment acquired distribution rights shortly after its premiere, and released it to video on demand and theatrically on August 28, 2015.

== Reception ==
Rotten Tomatoes, a review aggregator, reports that 67% of six surveyed critics gave the film a positive review; the average rating is 6/10. Richard Whittaker of The Austin Chronicle compared it to "the best of The X-Files" and said, "Morvant furiously pushes the scenario to its limits, making the increasingly dangerous and erratic veteran equally enthralling, terrifying, and tragic." Patrick Cooper of Bloody Disgusting rated it 3.5/5 stars and wrote, "Keating leaves much of Pod's narrative ambiguous, which works at times but ultimately makes the film feel like an exercise in tension than a fully-fleshed movie." Samuel Zimmerman of Shock Till You Drop called it "a jarring, exciting cinematic funhouse". Matt Donato of We Got This Covered rated it 2/5 stars and wrote, "Maybe you'll be more forgiving of such a rapid-fire approach to horror filmmaking, but between Layla's borderline unwatchable nature, to a story that doesn't really have time to explain any of the chilling actions taking place, Keating's latest film struggles with being a talky, under-complicated breeze." Frank Scheck of The Hollywood Reporter wrote that the film's atmospheric tension is not enough to overcome the derivative storyline. Matt Boiselle of Dread Central rated it 3.5/5 stars and praised Morvant's acting, which he called a "potent performance".
