= Victoria Carroll =

American actress, dancer and artist (born 1941)

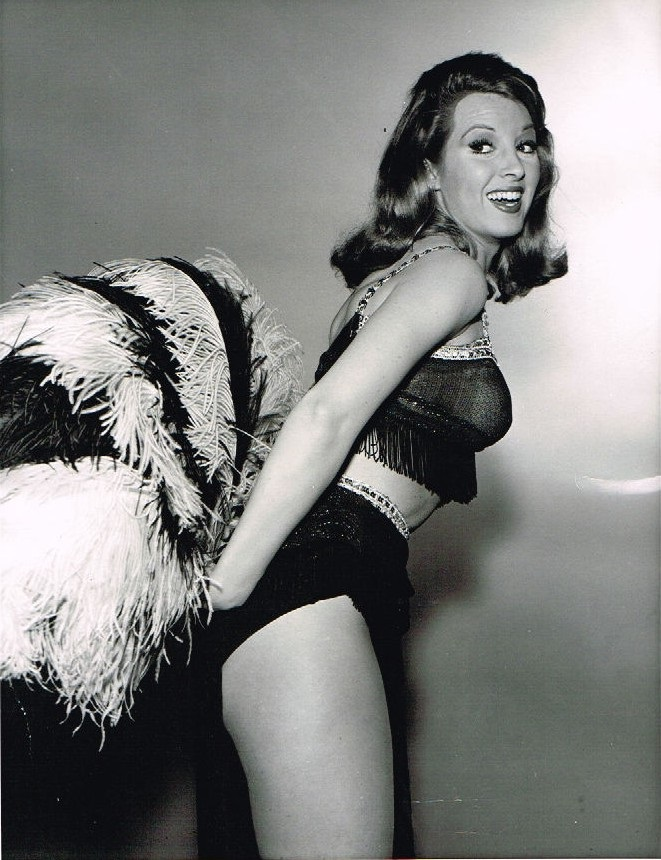
- Born: Mary Carol Lee Ford; January 21, 1941 (age 85)
- Other names: Victoria Carrol-Bell; Victoria Bell
- Occupations: Actress; dancer; artist
- Years active: 1964–2013, 2018
- Spouse: Michael Bell (m. 1984)
- Children: Ashley Bell

Victoria Carroll (born Mary Carol Lee Ford; January 21, 1941), also known as Victoria Carrol-Bell, is an American retired actress, dancer and artist. She is best known as Marie Massey in Alice (1978–1984).

== Early life ==
Carroll was born Mary Carol Lee Ford on January 21, 1941.

In 1941, her parents took 12-day old Victoria to audition for the role of Greer Garson's baby daughter in MGM's Blossoms in the Dust.

During the late 1940s, her whole family performed together on stage with Victoria as the "World's Youngest Mind Reader".

== Career ==
=== Film career ===
By 1964, her dancing career had plunged into films. George Cukor had been so impressed by her that, apart from her dancing part in My Fair Lady, he gave her a minor role as a Magpie in the race scene with Rex Harrison and Audrey Hepburn. She acquired an agent and also changed her name to Victoria Carroll because there already were actresses named Mary Ford and Carol Lee Ford registered in the SAG.

Despite her part in a highly praised and successful film, Carroll had small roles in films throughout the 1960s: a part in the chorus in Robin and the 7 Hoods, the dance girl playing Lady Godiva in The Art of Love, the shoeshine girl in How to Stuff a Wild Bikini, the woman presenting Elvis Presley's character with his trophy in Spinout, the girl who is mistaken for a spy by Marty Allen's character in The Last of the Secret Agents?, dance hall girl in The Fastest Guitar Alive, and crime boss Earl Veasey's girlfriend in The Road Hustlers. In 1969, she played the go-go dancer Carissa in the horror film Nightmare in Wax.

Her film work briefly continued in the mid-1970s with roles in Gemini Affair, Hustle, The Kentucky Fried Movie, The Billion Dollar Hobo, The Lucifer Complex, and Pandemonium.

=== Television career ===
Carroll has made appearances on TV shows from 1960s-present. In 1964, she played a nurse on McHale's Navy. In 1965 she appeared on The Jack Benny Program as Miss Collins. In 1967, she had a small role on The Beverly Hillbillies. In 1968–1970, she appeared as six different characters on six episodes of Hogan's Heroes. Carroll played Nina Sue on an episode of The Waltons in 1981. In 1982, she played Dottie in an episode of Dynasty, and in 1982–83, she made several appearances on Gimme a Break! and more. She was Mel's girlfriend, Marie Massey on Alice (1978–1984). She also played "The Newlywed Wife" on "Death of A Few Salesmen" on "Sledge Hammer."

=== The Groundlings ===
In 1974, Victoria Carroll became one of the first actors to join The Groundlings (formerly known as "The Gary Austin Workshop"), a newly formed acting/comedy troupe

Up until that point of her career she had not really shown her comedic skills. Very soon that changed as she played a variety of characters in her seven years with the improv team, such as blond bimbo author Lureen Sue Franchot. She recalls "I just really concentrated on doing comedy. [...] For me, my career began with The Groundlings. When I am asked about all this early stuff, my memory is sort of hazy."

=== Voice work ===
Carroll has also worked extensively as a voice actress since the early 1980s. Among her voice-over roles in cartoons are:

- A Pup Named Scooby-Doo as Scooby's Mom (in the ep. Curse of the Collar and The Were-Doo of Doo Manor)
- The Incredible Hulk as the She-Hulk
- Darkwing Duck as Doctor Beatrice Brute
- Batman: The Animated Series as Matron
- Scooby-Doo Meets the Boo Brothers as Sadie-Mae Scroggins
- The 13 Ghosts of Scooby-Doo as Kangaroo Waitress
- Pound Puppies as Doc West
- Wildfire as Mrs. Ashworth
- The Mask: The Animated Series as Doctor Amelia Chronos
- The Grim Adventures of Billy & Mandy as Dog Show Judge
- Chip 'n Dale Rescue Rangers as Bossy, Alice and Pomona
- DuckTales as The Three Witches
- TaleSpin as Princess Grace
- Timeless Tales from Hallmark as the Woman
- The Smurfs
- Shirt Tales
- Richie Rich
- Camp Candy
- The Story of Santa Claus
- Izzy's Quest for Olympic Gold as Fortius
- What-a-Mess
- Paddington Bear
- The Jetsons

== Artist ==
She is also an accomplished artist under the pen name Victoria K. Bell. Carroll specializes in paintings covering the "Nostalgic Era".

In 2010, her work was featured as part of the Diverse Expression at The Universal Art Gallery. It was met with an overwhelmingly positive response.

== Personal life ==
Carroll married fellow voice actor Michael Bell in 1984. They have a daughter, Ashley Bell, who is also an actress.
