= Journey to Promethea =

2010 television film

- Written by: Danie Garcia
- Directed by: Daniel Garcia
- Starring: Billy Zane; Scott L. Schwartz; Louis Herthum; Jessica Heap; James DuMont
- Theme music composer: Andrew Markus
- Country of origin: United States

Production
- Producers: Danie Garcia; Michael Thompson
- Cinematography: John Lands
- Production company: DMG Holdings
- Budget: $951,167

Original release
- Network: Phase 4 Films
- Release: 2010

Journey to Promethea is a 2010 American epic fantasy film written and directed by Daniel Garcia, starring Billy Zane, Scott L. Schwartz, and Louis Herthum.

== Plot ==
The movie opens with a narration describing the fate of the Samillian Tribe; once a noble people, they were subjugated by the despotic King Laypach (Zane) and condemned to wander aimlessly in the wilderness. The Samillians rebelled against King Laypach, under the command of their mightiest warrior and holy leader, Draden (Begneaud), who slew over a thousand of Laypach's men. After a 23-year struggle, Draden is captured and beheaded. Before his execution, however, he prophesies that his spirit will descend upon a member of the Samillians, who will then lead them against their oppressors and to the holy land of Promethea.

Eight years later, Grado Amurilus (Battles), son of the deposed King of the Samillians, is living as a farmer with his own boys, Magnus (Murphy) and Binon (Michaelson). Despite a century-and-a-half of Samillian oppression, they live an idyllic life, seemingly untouched by Laypach's tyranny. Meanwhile, King Laypach is informed by his Wise Men that Draden's prophecy has come to pass, and that the chosen liberator of the Samillian tribe has come of age. They warn that King Laypach must not allow the boy to unite with Draden's daughter, Aria, and receive Draden's sword. If the chosen one uses the sword to pierce the ancient Stone of Groboda—which was blessed by the gods after it fell to the earth—King Laypach will turn to dust. They tell him the chosen boy will possess "the light" of Draden in his eyes. King Laypach dismisses the wise men and orders the boy found and brought before him.

The Samillians are continuing their aimless trek through the wilderness, now accompanied by the Amurilus family. Binon attacks Laypach's soldiers who are escorting them. In the ensuing fight, Grado is mortally wounded and Binon is captured. With his dying breath, Grado tells Magnus that he must free their people. After cremating his father in a small bundle of sticks, Magnus encounters a magical chicken, which reveals itself to be the small yellow wizard Gydro (Rin Varick). Gydro speaks the phrase "A man’s unfulfilled destiny is the shame of the universe," and Magnus's eyes glow with the light of Draden. Gydro falls to his knees, stunned and elated that he has found the appointed liberator of the Samillians. Magnus leaves him. After fasting and bowing before the gods of the moon, the wise men return to King Laypach with news of the Magnus's location. Laypach summons his greatest warrior, the fearsome knight Kronin (Schwartz), to find him.

Magnus comes across a hunter, Ari (Herthum), in the forest. Magnus tells Ari of his quest to free his brother, and though Ari refuses to discuss his past or personal life, the two decide to carry on together.

Binon is brought before King Laypach, and the wise men determine that while he is not the chosen one, the two are very close. Binon is sent to the dungeons, where he meets a raving, deformed prisoner named Arden (DuMont), who taunts him.

As Kronin ravages the countryside searching for Magnus, Gydro meets with Draden's daughter, Aria (Heap), to tell her that he has found the chosen one. Aria asks if it is in fact the chosen one, and Gydro confirms. The princess and her four warrior handmaidens decide to set out to find him as well. Magnus and Ari share a meal with two women in the woods, who it is implied may have some supernatural abilities. Back in the faraway territories of King Laypach, the wise men are beheaded for their apparent failures.

Ari decides to teach Magnus how to fight and the two train. Kronin, during his search for Magnus, comes upon a blind fortune teller in the woods. She reveals that his destiny is "to kill and be killed."

Princess Aria and her group are attacked that night by bandits, and her handmaiden Derja (Itzel) is killed. They burn her body as Gydro performs an ancient funeral rite. In the dungeons, Arden reveals why he is imprisoned: he was once a soldier in King Laypach's army, but finally refused to murder the wife of a soldier who had refused to commit atrocities. Through flashbacks, it is revealed that the soldier is Ari.

Magnus and Ari come across the same blind fortune teller as Kronin, and despite Ari's protests, she reveals that Magnus is destined to be a mighty warrior with a great destiny. Kronin returns to King Laypach in shame, lamenting the difficulty of finding someone who hides in the dense forests. Laypach is displeased and orders that Binon be taken from the dungeons to lead them to his brother.

Magnus and Ari come across Princess Aria's group in the forest, and Magnus is immediately smitten. The two are about to part ways when Gydro appears and reveals to Aria Magnus's true identity as the Samillian liberator. He presents Magnus with Draden's sword, which glows blue when Magnus grips it. Later, as the group camps, Sina, one of Princess Aria's handmaidens, tries to seduce Magnus in the hopes of becoming his queen. He refuses, and since Princess Aria has witnessed this treachery, Sina curses them and flees into the forest.

That night, Ari is staring sadly at the moon, picturing his dead wife. Magnus brings him back to the group, where Gydro is dying. He tells them that the Stone of Groboda is half a day's journey to their left, and warns them that the great Kronin is closing in on them. Gydro dies, and Ari says he will lead the rest of the way.

The next morning, Kronin stumbles upon an exhausted Sina, who betrays the group's location out of jealousy that Aria had referred to Derja, and never Sina, as her sister. In the dungeons, Arden curses the name of the king. Magnus, Ari, Aria and her remaining two handmaidens arrive at the Stone of Groboda just as Kronin and his soldiers, with Binon in chains, arrive. Kronin calls for their heads and the battle begins. Ari and the handmaidens kill several soldiers, but both handmaidens are killed. Magnus frees Binon from his chains as Ari crosses swords with Kronin. Kronin quickly overpowers Ari, who dies with visions of his wife calling to him.

Binon is next, but proves to be no match for Kronin; Magnus intervenes as Kronin is about to kill Binon. Magnus and Kronin fight, and Magnus finally manages to kill the evil knight. Magnus uses Draden's sword to pierce the Stone of Groboda, and a massive bolt of light erupts from the Stone. King Laypach, far away in his throne room, turns to dust; Arden, still in his dungeon cell, smiles as his deformities melt away. The Samillians celebrate their new freedom, and, after years of wandering, finally come to see Promethea, which is just outside the woods. Magnus and Aria kiss, and Binon opens a karate school.

== Cast ==
- Billy Zane as King Laypach
- Scott L. Schwartz as Kronin
- Louis Herthum as Ari
- Jessica Heap as Aria
- James DuMont as Arden
- Sam Murphy as Magnus
- Marcelle Baer as Harin
- Drew Battles as Grado
- Gabe Begneaud as Draden
- Debby Gaudet as Esmae
- Judy Henderson as Thea
- Natacha Itzel as Derja
- Caleb Michaelson as Binon
- Jill Miller as Emiline
- Lacey Minchew as Sina
- Drew Rin Varick as Gydro
- Danielle Davis as Sheefa

== Release ==
The film aired in the United States in 2010. It received DVD release on October 19, 2010.

== Reception ==
=== Critical response ===
Sci-fi-online.com offered that film had a jumbled plot which made little sense and, in viewing, felt longer than its 84 minutes. The acting was considered poor enough to make it a career ender for most actors, with Billy Zane's participation the only thing good about the production. They offered that filmmaker Dan Garcia did not understand the genre, writing "the film takes every fantasy stereotype, attempts to use them but in reality the writer/director has no idea about the genre." They expanded, "cinematography, which is minimal and the directing is pretty awful too, with shots jumping from crane shots to mid shots and close ups as if the director had no idea what he was trying to impart with each shot, rather like the news, he just thought it a good idea to change the shot every twenty second to stop the audience from falling asleep." They noted that the medieval setting was poorly created, with costuming too pristine and the medieval era village too tidy. The few special effects used in the film consisted of poor graphics and visualizations representing the film's castle. Script, acting, and music were overall poor.

The Film Pilgrim observed that the DVD cover art was at odds with the actual film contents, noting it as a "last-gasp desperate gambit of a marketing department that knows it’s selling a stinker." Its depiction of a sword-wielding man in a classic fantasy action pose might lead purchasers incorrectly into presuming he was in fact the film's star. They offered that it appeared that greater time and financing went into the artwork than into the film itself. They wrote "the DVD cover mis-sells the film so badly — does such a good job of making the film out to be something it fundamentally isn’t — that there are bound to be some people out there who will fall foul of the film’s well-designed cover, thinking they might be renting or buying a half-decent fantasy film." The film's characters are weak and inconsistent. The overall opinion is that the film is "universally bad," with a plot "conceived in a five-minute brainstorming session with a copy of ‘Generic Film Plots volume 1’." In conclusion it was offered, "A poor film from beginning to end I recommend you avoid Journey to Promethea at all costs."

Movie Scribes was kinder, offering that the film's poor qualities unintentionally made it into a comedy, writing it "has to go down as one of the world’s most funniest medieval movies." The noted that the poor acting, set design, and dialogue seemed made from film school educational materials, resulting in "the opening scenes are just laugh out loud funny." They were surprised that Billy Zane took a role in the film, noting its poor quality would make the film a failure that Zane would never forget.

=== Awards and nominations ===
The film won a 2010 Accolade Awards "Award of Merit" for "Best Original Score."
