= Edge of Normal =

American sci-fi web series

- Genre: Sci-Fi: Drama
- Created by: Amanda Overton
- Written by: Amanda Overton
- Directed by: Amanda Overton
- Starring: Allie Shea; Anna Rubley; Devin Brooke; Katie Orr; Nik Isbelle; Sarah Colberto
- Theme music composer: Giona Ostinelli
- Opening theme: All that you are by Life Down Here
- Country of origin: United States
- Original languages: English with French and Spanish Subtitles
- No. of seasons: 1
- No. of episodes: 6

Production
- Executive producer: Tiffany L. Gray
- Producers: Samantha Covington, Chrissie Messuri
- Production locations: Los Angeles, California
- Cinematography: Katie Walker
- Editor: Sarah C. Reeves
- Running time: 3-8 minutes

Original release
- Network: YouTube
- Release: July 16, 2013 – 20 August 2013

Edge of Normal is an American sci-fi web series created by Amanda Overton as her graduate thesis project from University of Southern California (USC). Inspired by Amanda's love for popular comics and films such as X-Men and The Dark Knight, Edge of Normal is a unique mixture of sci-fi and superhero elements in a web serialized format. In 2013 the web series was bought for distribution by Wonderly. Wonderly is a YouTube Multi-Channel Network, subsidiary of Big Frame that focuses on innovative female creators. Edge of Normal premiered its first season on July 16, 2013, with the episode "Natalie".

== Plot overview ==
The web series focuses on six teenage girls who possess extraordinary, mysterious and dangerous powers, and their struggle to grow up in a world where their mistakes have deadly repercussions. The first season comprises six episodes, one for each of the girls, and tells the story of how they must band together to save one of their own from her super-powered father. As of 2014 there has been no update yet as to whether or not there is going to be a season 2.

== Characters ==
- Devin Brooke as Natalie Reed: 17 years old. A mind-reader that can both hear other people's thoughts and, through eye-contact, see and feel their memories. Lives with her maternal grandmother. Other relatives include a mother, step-father and twin brother that currently reside out-of-state.
- Anna Rubley as Gretchen Summers: 18 years old. Electronic symbiant and photographic memory. She lives with her mother, Francine Summers. They were abandoned by her father who has history of violent tendencies.
- Nik Isbelle as Kris Freeman: 17 years old. Her abilities allow her to generate an energy pulse rendering those nearby unconscious. She lives with her mother, Bonnie Freeman, and her sister, Kimmi. Both protective and impulsive. Kris acts as the primary care-giver for her young sister.
- Allie Shea as Kimmi Freeman: 12 years old. Her abilities allow her to project her consciousness forward in time allowing her to perceive future events. She lives with her mother, Bonnie Freeman, and her sister Kris. Despite her mother's physical presence, Kris is her primary caregiver.
- Katie Orr as Riley Marks:18 years old. Her physical appearance changes based on observers’ perception. Always wearing headphones, Riley considers her ability more of a burden than a benefit.
- Sarah Colbert as Evey Simms: 15 years old. Her abilities are unknown until episode 6, when she reveals that people who hear her verbal commands must involuntarily follow them. Due to a traumatic incident with her power as a young girl, Evey doesn't talk and has been separated from her mother and homeless for over three years.

== Episodes ==
=== Season 1 (2013) ===
No.	Title	Original release date
1	"Natalie"	July 16, 2013
This episode introduces Natalie, a mind-reader who struggles to control her power. Natalie finds Evey in a alley outside of the coffee shop where she works. Natalie attempts to befriend the guarded Evey, a destitute young girl with a dark and mysterious past. The episode ends when Natalie's friend Gretchen shows up in the middle of the night with a huge gash in her head.
2	"Gretchen"	July 23, 2013
This episodes picks where the last one left and introduces Gretchen, a vigilante by night, who uses her special power and the support of her friend Kris to put evil men behind bars. Gretchen gets in over her head when her powerful father finally returns. Out of options, Gretchen asks Natalie for help.
3	"Kimmi"	July 30, 2013
This episode introduces Kimmi, a delicate 12-year-old with the ability to see the future. In order to save Gretchen from her father, Natalie must turn to Kimmi. Reading Kimmi's fragile mind is dangerous and doesn't come without a price for both Natalie and the girls.
4	"Riley"	August 6, 2013
This episode introduces Riley, a shape-shifter whom Natalie must convince to help them stop Frank. Kimmi's future vision has put a ticking clock on Gretchen's life. Can the girls come together and save her in time?
5	"Kris"	August 13, 2013
This episode reveals the mystery behind Kris's power and Natalie uses this knowledge to create a plan to stop Frank with the help of the girls. Kris ignores Natalie's warnings when Gretchen is threatened, and pays for it. Frank gains the upper hand and in a rage, leaves both Kris and Gretchen clinging to life.
6	"Evey"	August 20, 2013
The season 1 finale focuses on Evey. With Frank's true nature revealed and the girls barely alive, Evey decides to risk everything to save her new friends. But a traitor is revealed and precarious deal is struck that leaves Evey a prisoner of the mysterious "Infinity" group.
Bonus–Content	"Natalie's Vlog, Kris's iPhone videos and Secret Scenes."	September 3, 2013
Parallel to the release of each episode, bonus videos were released as ancillary content to the main story. Natalie vlogs to about her search to find others like herself. Kris records videos with her iPhone to try to understand her power and her path to becoming a vigilante with Gretchen. Secret Scenes give more context to the main episodes and are linked via annotated pop-up buttons that serve as a branching narrative.

== Reception ==
Edge of Normal has favorable reviews in Video Ink, AfterEllen, Snobby Robot, Autostraddle, Paper Droids and Indie Intertube (podcast). It was ranked among the top 3 Indie web series of the week, featured as one of the best videos by Autostraddle, and reviewed by Spanish blog Lesbicanarias as a diamond in the rough. The web series has also been featured in Vox Magazine as a YouTube web series to watch, SgImpact, The PNT TV network and wiwmonline.com
