= MTV Movie Award for Best Scared-As-Shit Performance =

Annual movie award

MTV Movie & TV Award for Most Frightened Performance
- Awarded for: Most Frightened Performance
- Country: United States
- Presented by: MTV
- First award: June 4, 2005
- Currently held by: Jennifer Coolidge, The White Lotus (2023)

Highlights
- Most nominations: Jessica Chastain (2); Dakota Fanning (2); Victoria Pedretti (2)
- Website: MTV.com

The following is a list for the MTV Movie & TV Award winners for Best Scared-As-Shit Performance. The award was first given out in 2005, and then in 2006. In 2010 this award was renamed from Best Frightened Performance and renamed to Most Frightened Performance in 2022. The award was not presented in 2012. In 2013, it was given back its original name, Best Scared-As-Shit Performance. As of 2016, there have been seven winners of the award with five women and two men. Actresses Dakota Fanning, Jessica Chastain and Victoria Pedretti hold the distinction of the only people to hold more than one nomination in the category, with Fanning winning the inaugural award in 2005 and Pedretti winning in 2021. The award returned in 2018 under the title Best Frightened Performance.

== Winners and nominees ==
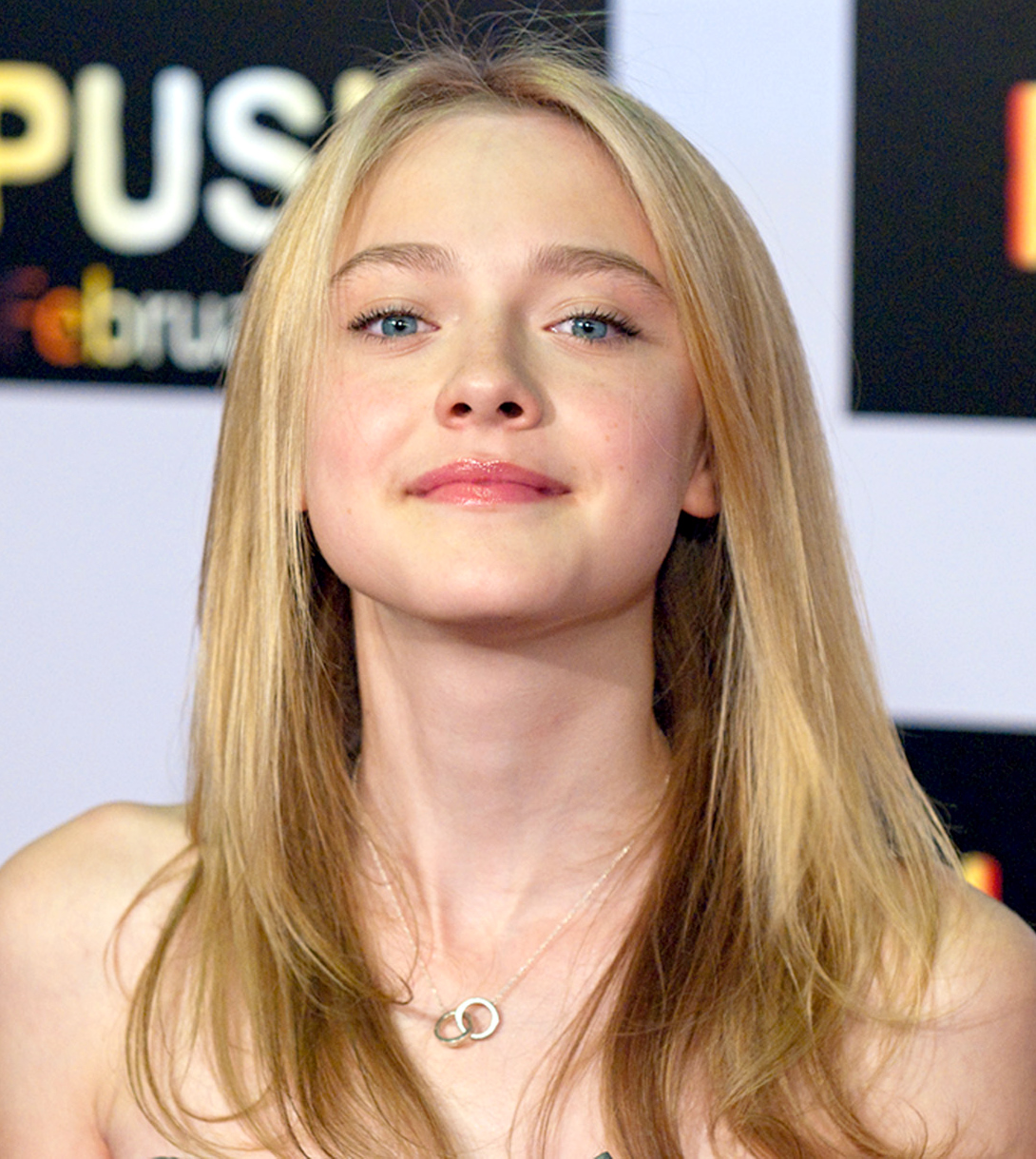
First winner of this award category Dakota Fanning on her performance in Hide and Seek, 2005

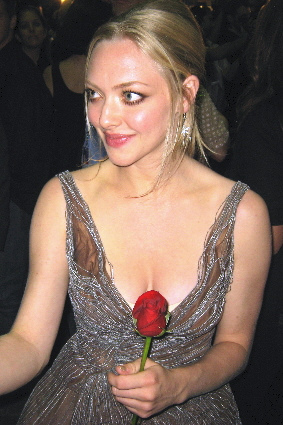
2010 winner Amanda Seyfried on her main performance in Jennifer's Body

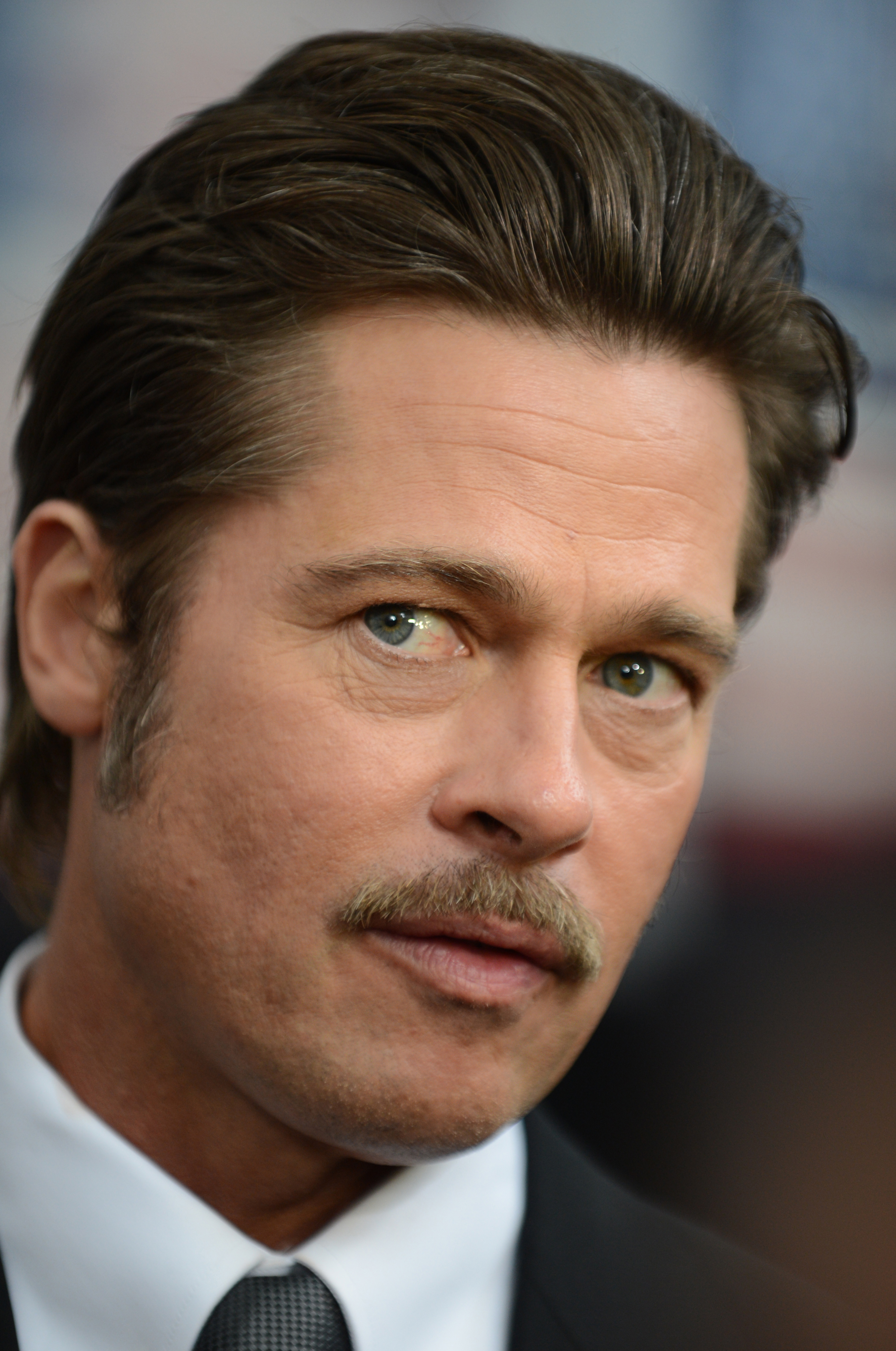
2014 winner Brad Pitt on his main performance in World War Z

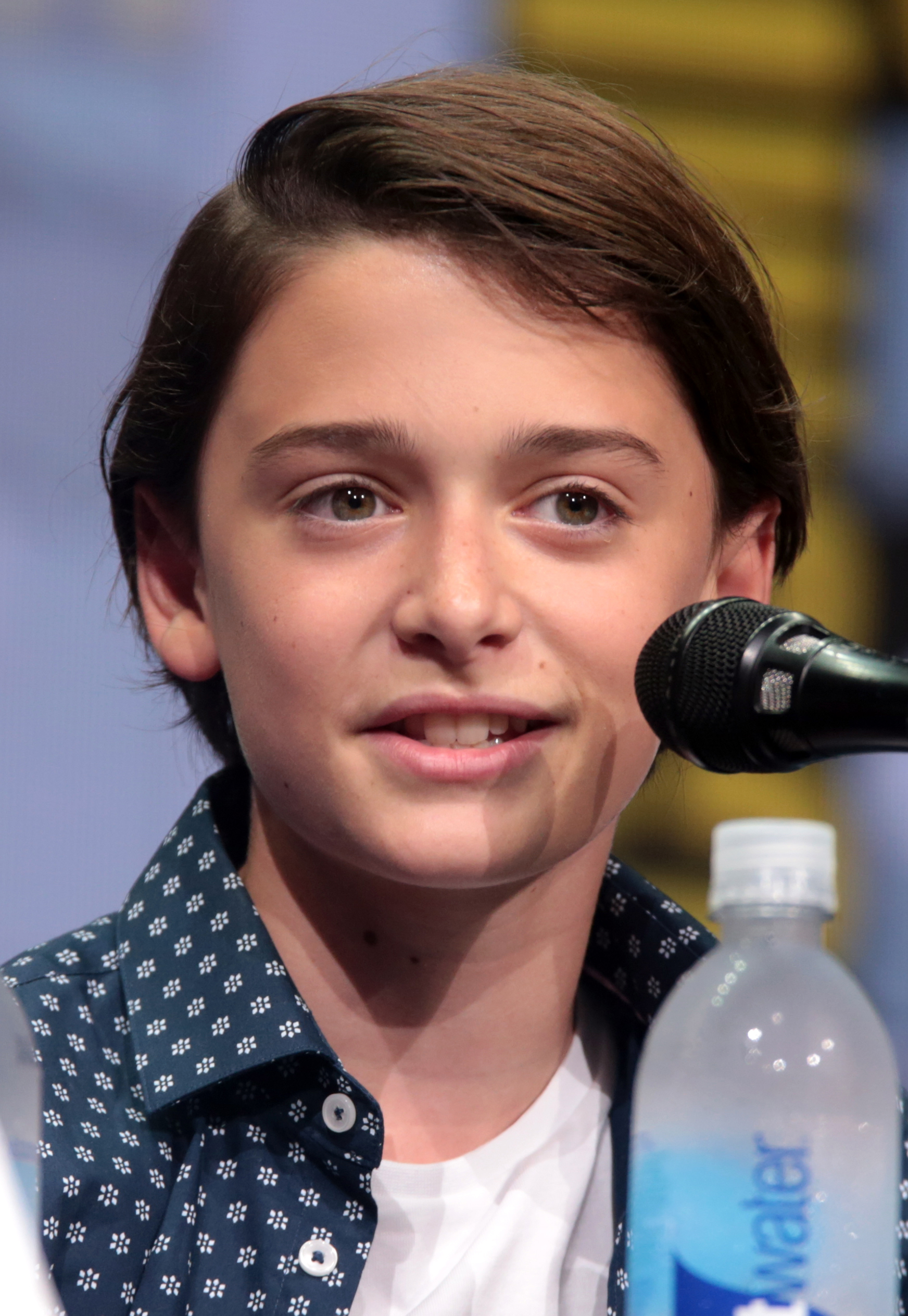
2018 winner Noah Schnapp on his main performance as Will Byers in season 2 of Stranger Things

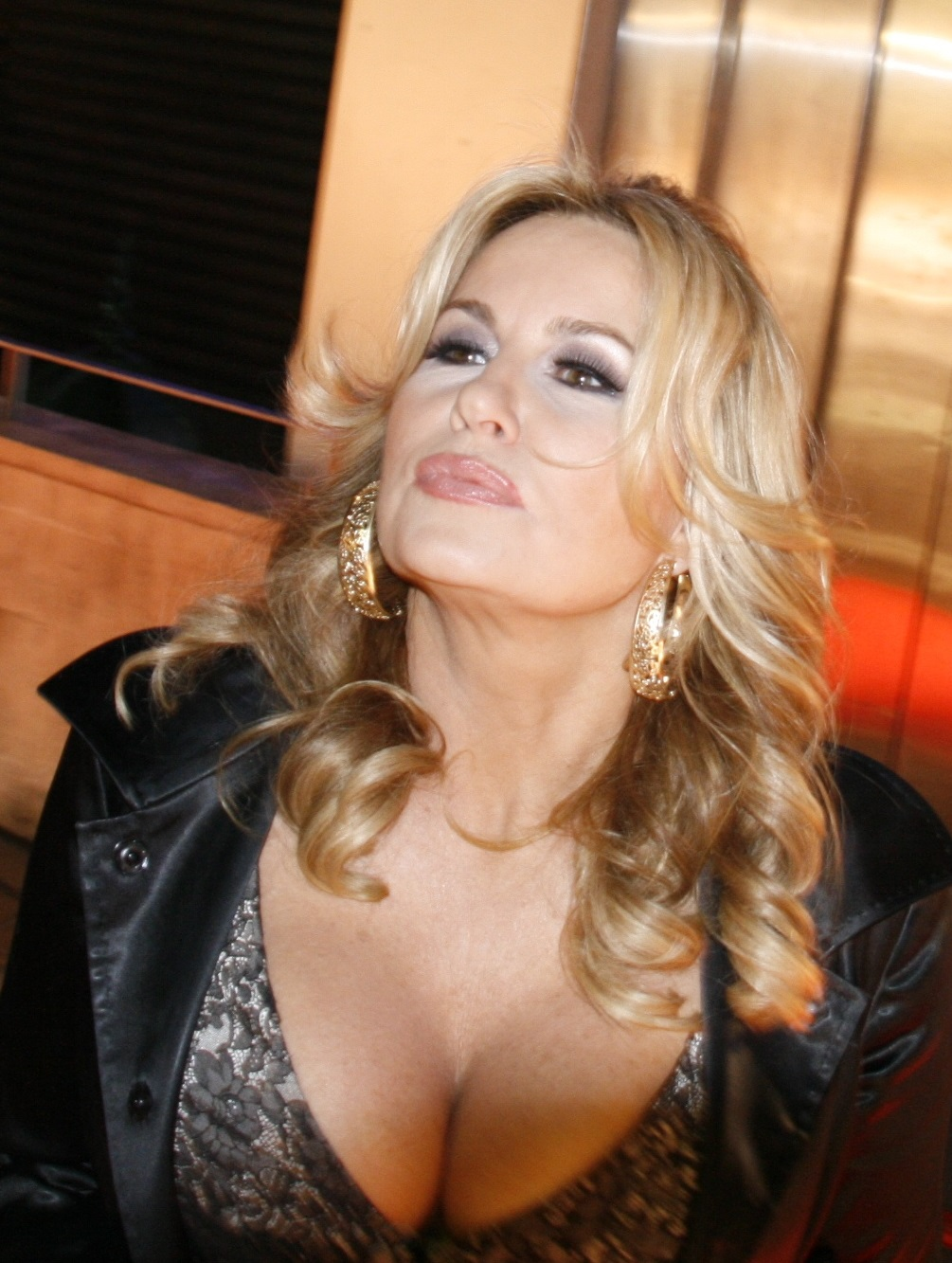
Most recent winner Jennifer Coolidge on her performance as Tanya McQuoid in season 2 of The White Lotus, 2023

Year	Actor Movie	Nominated	Ref.
2005	Dakota Fanning – Hide and Seek	Cary Elwes – Saw; Sarah Michelle Gellar – The Grudge; Mýa – Cursed; Jennifer Tilly – Seed of Chucky	
2006	Jennifer Carpenter – The Exorcism of Emily Rose	Dakota Fanning – War of the Worlds; Paris Hilton – House of Wax; Rachel Nichols – The Amityville Horror; Derek Richardson – Hostel	
2010	Amanda Seyfried – Jennifer's Body	Sharlto Copley – District 9 Jesse Eisenberg – Zombieland; Katie Featherston – Paranormal Activity; Alison Lohman – Drag Me to Hell	
2011	Elliot Page – Inception	Ashley Bell – The Last Exorcism; Minka Kelly – The Roommate; Ryan Reynolds – Buried; Jessica Szohr – Piranha 3D	
2013	Suraj Sharma – Life of Pi	Alexandra Daddario – Texas Chainsaw 3D; Jennifer Lawrence – House at the End of the Street; Jessica Chastain – Zero Dark Thirty; Martin Freeman – The Hobbit: An Unexpected Journey	
2014	Brad Pitt – World War Z	Ethan Hawke – The Purge; Jessica Chastain – Mama; Rose Byrne – Insidious: Chapter 2 Vera Farmiga – The Conjuring	
2015	Jennifer Lopez – The Boy Next Door	Annabelle Wallis – Annabelle; Dylan O'Brien – The Maze Runner; Rosamund Pike – Gone Girl; Zach Gilford – The Purge: Anarchy	
2018	Noah Schnapp – Stranger Things	Talitha Bateman – Annabelle: Creation; Emily Blunt – A Quiet Place; Sophia Lillis – It; Cristin Milioti – Black Mirror	
2019	Sandra Bullock – Bird Box	Alex Wolff – Hereditary; Linda Cardellini – The Curse of La Llorona; Rhian Rees – Halloween; Victoria Pedretti – The Haunting of Hill House	
2021	Victoria Pedretti – The Haunting of Bly Manor	Simona Brown – Behind Her Eyes; Elisabeth Moss – The Invisible Man; Jurnee Smollett – Lovecraft Country; Vince Vaughn – Freaky	
2022	Jenna Ortega – Scream	Mia Goth – X Kyle Richards – Halloween Kills; Millicent Simmonds – A Quiet Place Part II; Sadie Sink – Fear Street Part Two: 1978	
2023	Jennifer Coolidge – The White Lotus	Jesse Tyler Ferguson – Cocaine Bear; Justin Long – Barbarian; Rachel Sennott – Bodies Bodies Bodies; Sosie Bacon – Smile	
