= Fab Five: The Texas Cheerleader Scandal =

American made-for-TV movie

- Opening title
- Written by: Teena Booth
- Directed by: Tom McLoughlin
- Starring: Jenna Dewan; Ashley Benson; Aimee Fortier; Jessica Heap; Stephanie Honore; Ashlynn Ross; Rhoda Griffis; Jason Davis; Dameon Clarke; Keith Flippen; Caroline McKinley; Tatum O'Neal
- Music by: Anton Sanko
- Country of origin: United States
- Original language: English

Production
- Producer: Robert J. Wilson
- Cinematography: Lloyd Ahern II
- Editor: Charles Bornstein
- Running time: 88 minutes
- Production company: Fox 21 Television Studios

Original release
- Network: Lifetime
- Release: August 2, 2008

Fab Five: The Texas Cheerleader Scandal is a 2008 American teen drama telefilm produced by Lifetime. It stars Jenna Dewan, Ashley Benson, and Tatum O'Neal, and was directed by Tom McLoughlin. The film premiered on August 2, 2008. It is based on real-life events that occurred at McKinney North High School in McKinney, Texas, in 2006, five teenage cheerleaders became notorious for truancies, violations of the school dress code, and general disrespect to the school community.

== Background ==
In 2005, Michaela Ward was hired to teach geography and coach the cheerleading squad at McKinney North High School. She discovered that five cheerleaders, nicknamed the "Fab Five", had been disruptive in school and off-campus. Branded as "mean girls", they broke rules, were truant, and caused disturbances in classes they attended. They also caused trouble during off-campus activities, posting photographs of themselves partying, drinking alcohol, and visiting an adult store on Myspace. Unable to deal with the Fab Five and the school administrators who did not punish them, Ward resigned in October 2006, despite her close relationships with her students. Ward reported to the media the Fab Five's unruly behavior and the school's handling of them. Learning about the story from Ward, Lifetime Television produced the film based on Ward's story.

== Plot ==
Five high school cheerleaders dubbed the "Fab Five"—Brooke Tippit (Ashley Benson) who is co-captain of the squad, Jeri Blackburn (Jessica Heap), Lisa Toledo (Aimee Fortier), Ashley Sanchez (Stephanie Honore), and Tabitha Doering (Ashlynn Ross) run amok as the mean girls of the school. Teachers, parents, and administrators fail to punish them for their unruly behavior, which includes repeatedly getting their coaches fired after disagreements or driving them to quit. These girls disregard school rules, drink alcohol, bully other students, and post suggestive pictures on the internet. After a new cheerleading coach Emma Carr (Jenna Dewan) arrives, the girls initially rebel against her but later become cooperative. Brooke becomes furious with Coach Carr when she assigns Meagan Harper, the most respected member of the squad, as co-captain because up until then, she had been the only captain. The Fab Five perform well at a pep rally, but after Ashley is kissed by Jeri's boyfriend, the other girls eject her from the group and later become the "Fab Four", although Ashley remains part of the squad. Carr tries to discipline the girls, which results in a change in attitude. The girls start bullying other pupils, including Cindy, Meagan's younger sister, and are suspended from the team. The Fab Four get drunk and are caught trying to leave the campus by a guard and the principal.

The girls tell the school's superintendent they were tired after a test and wanted to sleep. The security guard then tells Carr about the incident, and she confronts the principal and superintendent, who give excuses for not punishing the girls. Carr insists the principal punishes them, so the principal threatens to dissolve the team. Defiant, Carr punishes the whole squad by continually canceling practices and kicking Jeri off the squad. At next practice session, Carr hands each of the girls an eraser for a "fresh" start, but only Tabitha accepts. As revenge for Jeri's ejection, the girls show the superintendent a picture of Carr hugging another teacher at the school and say the two have been having an affair. At the discipline meeting for Jeri, Carr is repeatedly accused of flirting and not formally punishing the girls.

At the next practice session, the squad struggles to perform the liberty stunt, but Carr inspires them to learn it. Carr finds Lisa has cheated on a test; after penalizing her, Lisa yells at Carr and storms out. Lisa then tells her father that Carr was bullying her, so Carr cancels practice and sends an email to the cheerleaders apologizing for it. She visits the school and is fired by the principal; later the girls confront Carr as she prepares to leave the school. She hears about a reporter who is researching "cheerleaders gone wild" and gives an interview about the ongoing events at Jackson High School. The school investigates, and the "Fab Four" enjoy the attention and lie to an independent investigator about their treatment. Carr discovers the investigator's true agenda, tells him what happened, leaves angrily, and bumps into Brooke. Carr simply asks her if she thinks the University of Southern California will accept her as a student after all the negative publicity that arose from what has happened.

The investigator reports that the allegations against the "Fab Four" and administrators are true and that Carr is innocent. He blames the principal for the problem and Carr losing her job. Lorene and the assistant principal are suspended from their jobs. Brooke is pulled from the school by her mother, and the rest of the "Fab Four" are no longer allowed to cheer. Brooke and her mother leave followed by cameras, Brooke then gives Carr the middle finger and Carr is visibly upset. However, Carr doesn't get her job back from the school. Four months later, Carr watches the girls at a cheer competition and is welcomed with praise and hugs, including a newly reformed Ashley, who she exchanges smiles with. The new cheerleaders compete, and Carr discovers Cindy had written an essay about her, discussing how she stood up to the administration and stopped the Fab Four from terrorizing their school, revealing that Carr did change things after all. The girls compete and perform the stunt they struggled with earlier, leaving Carr feeling proud and worthy.

== Cast ==
- Jenna Dewan as Coach Emma Carr
- Ashley Benson as Brooke Tippit
- Tatum O'Neal as Principal Lorene Tippit
- Aimee Fortier as Lisa Toledo
- Jessica Heap as Jeri Blackburn
- Stephanie Honore as Ashley Sanchez
- Ashlynn Ross as Tabitha Doering
- Rhoda Griffis as Pamela Blackburn
- Jason Davis as Tim
- Dameon Clarke as Coach Adam Reeve
- Keith Flippen as Mr. Spretnak
- Caroline McKinley as Janice Harper
- Carissa Capobianco as Cindy Harper
- Hailey Wist as Meagan Harper

== Location ==
The movie was filmed in the New Orleans metropolitan area. The final scene of the cheerleading competition was shot at the Alario Center in Westwego, Louisiana.

== Reception ==
Fab Five aired on August 2, 2008, and scored a 2.63 household rating (3,041,547 viewers). It scored a 2.63 rating (280,405 viewers) among females aged 12–17 and a 2.17 rating (1,219,726 viewers) among females aged 18–49. Linda Stasi of the New York Post gave the film three stars out of four.

As Newsweek noted, the real-life events that inspired the film were "grimmer" than the television movie; the real-life principal and the vice-principal of the school lost their jobs. Girls from the Myspace photographs (the "Fab Five") became victims of stalkers and "haunted by their reputations [from high school]". Discipline at McKinney North High School became stricter than before. As Newsweek noted further, the film was close to the real-life events, the portrayal of Jenna Dewan's character was "brave but naïve", and the story was "an entertaining morality tale" yet "preachy".

Steve Thompson of Yahoo! Voices praised this movie for addressing important messages to viewers about consequential actions, especially by schools and cheerleaders. Thompson called the portrayal of cheerleaders "purely evil" and vindictive, and noted some scenes inspired by other real "mean girls" events, such as the beating of a 16-year-old girl in Lakeland, Florida, rather than the McKinney incidents.

== Aftermath ==
After the story broke, Michaela Ward faced unemployment and "became ostracized", especially after her lawsuits. In 2008 she filed an unsuccessful lawsuit to get her job back. According to KGNS-TV, Ward coaches cheerleading in McKinney, Texas, and had privately coached a former pupil. In December 2009, former principal Linda Theret was hired by the Laredo Independent School District as Executive Director of Curriculum.
