= The Day (2011 film) =

Canadian post-apocalyptic film

- Theatrical release poster
- Directed by: Douglas Aarniokoski
- Written by: Luke Passmore
- Produced by: Guy A. Danella
- Starring: Ashley Bell; Shannyn Sossamon; Dominic Monaghan; Shawn Ashmore; Cory Hardrict
- Cinematography: Boris Mojsovski
- Edited by: Andrew Coutts
- Music by: Rock Mafia
- Production companies: Guy A. Danella Productions; Preferred Content; Faction M
- Distributed by: WWE Studios; Anchor Bay Films
- Release dates: September 12, 2011 (2011 Toronto International Film Festival); August 29, 2012 (United States)
- Running time: 87 minutes
- Country: Canada
- Language: English
- Box office: $20,984

The Day is a 2011 Canadian post-apocalyptic film directed by Douglas Aarniokoski. The film stars Ashley Bell, Shannyn Sossamon, Dominic Monaghan, Shawn Ashmore and Cory Hardrict. The film premiered on September 16, 2011 at the 2011 Toronto International Film Festival. The film was released in 12 theaters in the United States on August 29, 2012. It screened theatrically for 16 days and grossed $20,984.

== Plot ==
The Day follows a group of five survivors in a post-apocalyptic world as they travel through a bleak environment in an attempt to find food, shelter, and a safe place to stop running from tribes of savage cannibals that roam the country-side. They hope to plant two jars of seeds that they either stole or found during their journey. There was at some point twelve in their group, but it is not known how the others died or how long the remaining five have been on the run.

One of the survivors, Adam (Shawn Ashmore), who we see in flashbacks, left his wife and daughter alone in the car outside while he searched for supplies inside an empty house located in a ravaged suburban community. His wife and daughter were attacked and either captured or killed. The rest of the group are Rick (Dominic Monaghan), Shannon (Shannyn Sossamon), Henson (Cory Hardrict) and Mary (Ashley Bell).

Seeking refuge in the countryside, the five decide to go to a nearby farmhouse for shelter, debating whether to stay until one of their group, Henson, has recovered from whatever has made him sick; or to rest there briefly and then move on to avoid attracting cannibals. The group separate: the men explore the house, while the two women head outside after their leader, Rick, asks them to try to trap some game. Instead, Mary goes to a nearby stream to clean up. While cleaning her dress, Mary hears someone moving toward her and realizes at the last minute that it's a scout for one of the tribes that live in the area. He chases her across the stream but she is able to reach her gun and shoot him.

Meanwhile, back in the farmhouse, Adam and Rick explore the basement and discover boxes full of tinned food. They yell out for Henson to come and look at what they've found but discover that the tins contained rocks, and inadvertently activate a trap that sets off an alarm, shuts the three men in the basement and kills Rick. Several cannibals show up and attempt to get to the men in the basement but are all killed by Shannon and Mary, who, hearing the alarm, rush back to the house where they find and confront the attackers. One of them recognizes a mark on Mary's thigh and identifies her as a cannibal from a rival tribe, then attempts to escape but is killed by Mary.

The women rescue the men from the basement and afterward, Shannon knocks Mary unconscious, having heard the cannibal question Mary about being one of them. The three decide to restrain her in a chair and question her aggressively about her past in order to learn who and what she really is. When she doesn't speak, Adam, furious over Rick's death, begins to torture her, while Shannon looks on, urging him to just kill her instead. After Adam cuts off the skin on Mary's thigh with her tribe mark and attempts to force feed it to her, Henson intervenes and stops Adam from going any further. Mary eventually gives in and tells Adam she was not responsible for killing Adam's wife and daughter. She explains that she massacred her own tribe while they were sleeping because they killed her younger sister who injured/broke her leg and would have died from infection in a week, so was immediately strung up and killed to be eaten. She insists that she was only trying to survive. She also reminds them that the tribe that set the trap is coming for them. After listening to the story, the three burn Rick's dead body while they debate whether to free her or kill her.

Meanwhile, the tribe of cannibals and its leader (Michael Eklund) swear to take back their house and supplies. The four barricade the entire house as they prepare themselves for the oncoming battle. Under cover of night, the tribe invades the house where the four are. As waves of attackers attempt to get inside, the group initially use weapons to stab or cut them, but eventually fire at them through the windows. Several men break through a barricade and drag Shannon outside, but she is saved by Henson, who is killed instead.

When Shannon unintentionally kills his young son, the leader of the attacking tribe is enraged and leaves his young daughter to avenge her brother's death. In the morning, the remaining cannibals attack the house once again, igniting it with Molotov cocktails. Mary insists Shannon and Adam leave through the back and leave her to confront the remaining enemy clan members in front of the house, which they agree upon. After they leave, Mary realizes Shannon has taken the shells from her shotgun.

Mary is overpowered by the leader, only to be saved when Adam comes back to help her fight off the last few cannibals. During the fight, he sustains a series of wounds which lead to his death. Out in the woods, Shannon is attacked, and her throat is slashed by the leader's daughter, who leaves her to die. At the farmhouse, Mary cremates Adam's remains, then starts to walk away only to encounter the leader's daughter who pretends to be an innocent girl. As they both start walking, the girl reaches for a jagged blade to kill her but Mary is quicker and decapitates her, then continues walking away from the burning farmhouse.

== Cast ==
- Ashley Bell as Mary
- Shannyn Sossamon as Shannon
- Dominic Monaghan as Rick
- Shawn Ashmore as Adam
- Cory Hardrict as Henson
- Michael Eklund as Father (leader of cannibals)
- Brianna Barnes as Nikki
- Kassidy Verreault as Ava
- Sophia Ewaniuk as leader's daughter
- Shimon Moore as Boss

== Production ==
The Day is directed by Douglas Aarniokoski based on a screenplay by Luke Passmore. Filming took place in Ottawa, Ontario, Canada, during the fall of 2010.

== Release ==
The Day premiered at the 2011 Toronto International Film Festival on September 12, 2011. After the screening, Splendid acquired rights to distribute the film in German-speaking territories in Europe and Benelux. WWE Studios also acquired rights to distribute the film in the United States. It later partnered with Anchor Bay Films to co-distribute the film. In November 2011, Entertainment One acquired rights to distribute the film in the United Kingdom, France, Scandinavia, and South Africa.

The film was released in 12 theaters in the United States on August 29, 2012. It was in release for 16 days and grossed $20,984.

== Reception ==
Review aggregator Rotten Tomatoes reports 31% among 16 reviews an average rating of 5 out of 10. Metacritic reports among 9 reviews an overall score of 41 out of 100; it identified one positive review, six mixed reviews, and two negative reviews.
