= Mutants (2008 film) =

- Directed by: Amir Valinia
- Written by: Jodie Jones; Evan Scott; Sam Sullivan
- Produced by: Matt Keith; George M. Kostuch
- Starring: Michael Ironside; Steven Bauer
- Cinematography: Barry Strickland
- Music by: Sammy Huen
- Production company: K2 Pictures
- Distributed by: Spotlight Pictures
- Release date: October 31, 2008
- Running time: 90 minutes
- Country: United States
- Language: English

Mutants is a 2008 (Note: While many sources give 2008 as the release date, Buchanan states 2009.) horror film starring Michael Ironside.

== Plot ==
The story of Mutants is told in a non-linear fashion. Flashbacks telling the main story are framed by pieces of a conversation between government agent Marcus Santiago and Colonel Gauge, the leader of Shadow Rock Securities International.

At the beginning of the film, Santiago is seen briefing Gauge on his mission, which involved spying on the Just Rite Sugar Company, who are allegedly involved in some kind of plot involving an unethical Russian scientist as well as Shadow Rock Securities itself. A visibly shaken Santiago warns Gauge that Shadow Rock's leader, Colonel Briggs, is involved in the plot; however, once assured that Briggs has been detained and Gauge is now Shadow Rock's commander, he details his activities, which included planting wire taps and spying on the operations of Just Rite. Santiago berates himself for following his orders – to spy but not get involved – too closely, as he could have stopped the plan before it progressed to its current stage, which he claims could be the extinction of humanity.

Prior to this, Just Rite security officials pursue an escaped girl, Hannah, through a seemingly abandoned mill, capturing and killing her before disposing of her body in a boiler.

Just Rite CEO Braylon meets with his security commander, Sykes, who informs him of the events at the mill. Braylon entrusts Sykes with cleaning up the situation, as some potential investors in his new sugar formula will be visiting the mill soon. It is revealed that Braylon intends to create a new type of sugar with an additive more addictive than crack cocaine and heroin combined. To that end, he has hired Sergei to conduct experiments in the mill. The men under Sykes's command were directed to abduct addicts and homeless people for Sergei's experiments. Braylon is more enraged by Sykes's men accidentally abducting Ryan, the brother of Braylon's secretary Erin, in the course of abducting Hannah, than he is by Hannah's escape and death. Previous batches of sugar devised by Sergei caused infections in their test subjects, and even though Hannah was previously designated "status clear," Braylon and Sergei are confident she was an anomaly, as no other subjects from the most recent batch became infected.

Ryan and Erin's father Griff, a Just Rite security guard dealing with alcoholism following his wife's death, discovers strange shipments being made to a supposedly abandoned sugar mill – which is also being observed by Santiago – and learns that Braylon has hired Shadow Rock to guard it independently of his usual security team. Meanwhile, Erin begins receiving strange e-mails at her desk from a mysterious figure calling themselves "Cinderella." Apparently a mole within Just Rite, Cinderella first sends Erin financial documents showing money being spent on the abandoned mill, then a photograph of Ryan in his holding cell. Together, Griff and Erin realize that Ryan must be at the mill, and resolve to rescue him.

Sergei makes an ominous discovery – the latest batch of sugar, which was shipped out when it was verified clear, is also infected, with the infection manifesting three months after ingestion. Upon receiving this news, Sykes gives up on the plan and decides to call in Shadow Rock's extermination team. Sergei pulls a gun, but Sykes kills him.

Erin and Griff infiltrate the mill by hiding inside a truck. While searching for Ryan, they encounter Sykes and prepare for a confrontation. However, Sykes reveals that he is Cinderella and joins them, escorting them to Ryan's cell. At the same time, Braylon escorts his potential investors around the mill, proudly showing them some of the test subjects. He explains while showing them one failed subject that the infection in the previous sugar batches attacks the victim's brain and breaks down their body, a point made clear when he shows them the longest-surviving subject, whose body has melted in many places. However, when Braylon opens the door of a subject he believes is "status clear," the subject is actually infected and attacks them. While one of Braylon's guards kills the infected subject, it is not before a security alarm is tripped that puts the entire mill on lockdown. This leaves Erin, Ryan, Griff and Sykes to escape through the ward where the most dangerous subjects are kept; meanwhile, Braylon and his investors escape. When the investors refuse to play any role in Braylon's plan, Braylon kills them both.

The Shadow Rock forces led by Gauge arrive at the mill and begin exterminating the infected. Erin, Ryan, Griff and Sykes manage to escape, but Sykes is shot and gets separated from the group in the confusion, and Ryan discovers that despite being "status clear" earlier, the boils characteristic of an infection have developed on his arm. Colonel Briggs suddenly appears and begins killing Gauge's men after freeing the trapped Braylon. He ambushes Gauge and shoots him in the shoulder, and the two briefly exchange gunfire while discussing the internal coup Gauge staged against Briggs. Gauge gives up when his gun runs out of bullets and steps out, inviting Briggs to shoot him; however, Briggs discards his gun and rushes Gauge, allowing Gauge the chance to stab him in the stomach with his knife. Gauge then finishes the injured Briggs off with the bullet remaining in his gun's chamber.

Ryan, Erin and Griff reunite with Sykes outside the mill, who reveals that he has rigged the entire mill with a self-destruct mechanism that he needs to be close to the building to activate. Revealing his infection, Ryan volunteers to drive the dying Sykes back into the mill. They successfully trigger the bombs before Ryan is killed by Shadow Rock's forces, and Braylon, watching his work go up in flames, is attacked and killed by an infected subject.

Gauge, who escaped the explosion, salutes Griff and Erin for their work. He reveals Braylon's fate to them, then assures them that none of the infected subjects or sugar got out. However, in a final flashback, the last part of Santiago's transmission is revealed, in which he instructs Gauge to exterminate everything at the mill and then get ready to "go hunting."

In an epilogue, people from all walks of life are seen consuming large quantities of Just Rite sugar. Everything appears normal until an elderly man being examined in a hospital appears to have the infection's boils on his body. As the doctor leaves the room, the view zooms out, revealing the entire waiting room filled with victims suffering from the infection.

== Cast ==
- Michael Ironside as Colonel Gauge
- Steven Bauer as Marcus Santiago
- Derrick Denicola as Ryan
- Sharon Landry as Erin
- Louis Herthum as Griff
- Tony Senzamici as Commander Sykes
- Richard Zeringue as Braylon
- Armando Leduc as Sergei
- Marc Gill as Colonel Briggs
