= Ashley Bell (actress) =

American actress (born 1986)

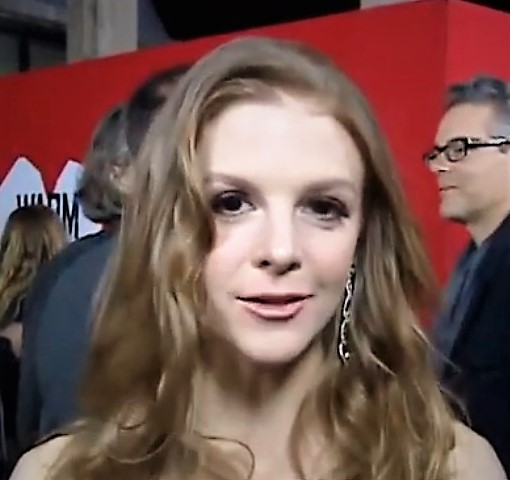
- Bell in 2013
- Born: May 26, 1986 (age 40); Santa Monica, California, U.S.
- Occupation: Actress
- Years active: 2003–present
- Parents: Michael Bell (father); Victoria Carroll (mother)

Ashley Bell (born May 26, 1986) is an American actress. She is known for her role as Nell Sweetzer in the films The Last Exorcism (2010) and The Last Exorcism Part II (2013).

== Early life ==
Bell was born in Santa Monica, California, the daughter of Victoria Carroll, an actress, and Michael Bell, an actor.

== Career ==
Following a string of film and television appearances on Boston Public, CSI: Crime Scene Investigation, the Mark Polish-penned Stay Cool and a four episode arc on Showtime's The United States of Tara, Bell made her feature film principal debut, starring as Nell Sweetzer, in the 2010 horror film The Last Exorcism. Her performance garnered her a 2011 Independent Spirit Award nomination for Best Supporting Actress, as well as a 2011 MTV Movie Award nomination for Best Scared-As-Shit Performance.

In 2014, Bell was a cast member in the Broadway revival of Sophie Treadwell's expressionist play Machinal directed by Lyndsey Turner. She played the roles of the Telephone Girl/Young Girl and served as an understudy for the lead, the Young Woman (played by Rebecca Hall).

In 2018, Bell directed the nature documentary Love & Bananas, which details the plight of Asian elephants in South East Asia. The film was official selection at the Environmental Film Festival and International Wildlife Film Festival. The film won the 2018 Humane Society Genesis Award for Best Feature Documentary. At Earth Day Network's 2019 Climate Leadership Gala, Bell was honored with the Women and the Green Economy Leadership award for her work.

As of 2023, Bell is a member of The Groundlings.

== Filmography ==
Film
Year	Title	Role	Notes
2009	Stay Cool	Valedictorian	
2010	Magic	Additional Voices	
2010	The Last Exorcism	Nell Sweetzer	Nominated—Independent Spirit Award for Best Supporting Female; Nominated—MTV Movie Award for Best Scared-As-S**t Performance
2011	The Day	Mary	
2011	The Truth About Angels	Redhead	
2011	Initiation		Short film
2013	Chasing Shakespeare	Molly	
2013	Sparks	Lady Heavenly	
2013	The Last Exorcism Part II	Nell Sweetzer	
2013	The Bounceback	Cathy	
2013	The Marine 3: Homefront	Lilly Carter	Direct-to-DVD
2015	Carnage Park	Vivian Fontaine	
2015	There Is a New World Somewhere	Sam	
2017	Novitiate	Sister Margaret	
2017	Charlie: Genesis	Ingrid Davis	
2017	Psychopaths	escaped mental patient	
2018	Love and Bananas: An Elephant Story	Herself	director; producer; screenwriter
2018	The Delta Girl	Miss Honey	Short film
2018	The Swerve	Claudia	
2020	Dear Guest	Maria	Short film
2020	Voices	Annabel	
2020	The SpongeBob Movie: Sponge on the Run	Additional Voices	
2021	Witch Hunt	Gina	

Television
Year	Title	Role	Notes
2003	Boston Public	Colleen	Episode: "Chapter 23"
2007	CSI: Crime Scene Investigation	Lanie	Episode: "Goodbye and Good Luck"
2009	United States of Tara	Tonya	4 episodes
2012	The Penguins of Madagascar	Zoe (voice)	
2014	The Walking Dead: The Oath	Karina	Webisode series
2015	Don't Wake Mommy	Molly	Television movie
2017	A Neighbor's Deception	Chloe Anderson	Television movie

Video games
Year	Title	Role	Notes
2005	Kingdom of Paradise	Lu Yan	
2010	Alice in Wonderland	The White Queen	
2012	Sorcery	Erline	
