= Indigenous (film) =

- Theatrical release poster
- Directed by: Alastair Orr
- Screenplay by: Max Roberts
- Produced by: Mark C. Manuel; Ted O'Neal; James Samson (co-producer)
- Starring: Zachary Soetenga; Lindsey McKeon; Sofia Pernas; Pierson Fodé; Jamie Anderson; Juanxo Villaverde; Layla Killino
- Cinematography: Brendan Barnes
- Edited by: Alastair Orr
- Music by: Giona Ostinelli
- Production company: Kilburn Media
- Distributed by: Lightning Entertainment
- Release date: April 20, 2014 (Tribeca Film Festival)
- Running time: 86 minutes
- Country: United States
- Languages: English; Spanish

Indigenous is a 2014 American horror film directed by Alastair Orr and written by Max Roberts. It stars Zachary Soetenga, Lindsey McKeon, Sofia Pernas, Pierson Fodé, Jamie Anderson, Juanxo Villaverde and Layla Killino.

== Plot ==
Five friends - Scott and his girlfriend Steph, Elena, Trevor, and Charlie - meet in Panama for vacation. While partying at night, Trevor meets locals Carmen and Julio. Scott becomes interested in exploring the Darién Gap, despite rumors that a group of teenagers were murdered by El Chupacabra in the area, and Julio's warnings. Carmen tells the group of a beautiful waterfall deep in the jungle and convinces them to hike there.

The following morning, Julio realizes that Carmen has taken the group into the jungle, and sets off to find them. The group hike far into the jungle to reach the waterfall. After some time, Trevor and Carmen leave the rest of the group to be alone, but begin to hear strange noises in the jungle. While Trevor is investigating, Carmen disappears. They call her, but find her phone smashed nearby. Their devices lose service, stranding them in the jungle.

As night falls, the group realize that they are being stalked. After catching a glimpse of a wild animal, the group scatter in terror, and Charlie is attacked and killed. Elena and Trevor discover the body and run into Scott and Steph. Scott gets to higher ground to get a signal and records a distress video, hoping it will reach someone who can help. Hearing by screaming, he rushes back, only to find a bloodied Trevor being dragged away. Scott follows him into a cave where he finds El Chupacabra's lair, then flees and catches up with Steph and Elena.

Trevor awakens in the cave with a broken leg and finds Carmen's mauled body. He attempts to escape from the cave, but is attacked and killed. The following day, Scott's video has been posted on social media and has gone viral, prompting a search and rescue mission by Panama authorities, accompanied by Julio.

Having survived the night, Scott, Steph and Elena are once again attacked by El Chupacabra. While running through the jungle, Steph breaks her ankle. Scott stays with Steph while Elena leaves to flag down the attention of an overhead helicopter. However, as the helicopter crew is recording Elena she is attacked by El Chupacabra. Soon afterwards, Scott and Steph are also attacked, but military personnel arrive and shoot El Chupacabra, saving them.

== Cast ==
- Zachary Soetenga as Scott Williams
- Lindsey McKeon as Steph Logan
- Sofia Pernas as Elena Cadero
- Pierson Fodé as Trevor
- Jamie Anderson as Charlie
- Juanxo Villaverde as Julio
- Layla Killino as Carmen
- Michael Mealor as Marlon Williams

== Production ==
Indigenous was shot on location in Panama. Director Orr credited his cast and crew with making the film possible, as they had to carry all of the equipment themselves through the jungle.

== Release ==
Indigenous premiered at the 2014 Tribeca Film Festival. It later played at the 2014 Cannes Film Festival.

== Reception ==
Mark Adams of Screen Daily wrote that it is "modestly entertaining" and "a well-made B-Movie" despite the familiar plot and one-note acting.
