= Darling (2015 American film) =

- Theatrical release poster
- Directed by: Mickey Keating
- Written by: Mickey Keating
- Produced by: Sean Fowler; Mickey Keating; Jenn Wexler
- Starring: Lauren Ashley Carter; Brian Morvant; Sean Young
- Cinematography: Mac Fisken
- Edited by: Valerie Krulfeifer
- Music by: Giona Ostinelli
- Production companies: Glass Eye Pix; Alexander Groupe
- Distributed by: Screen Media Films
- Release date: September 25, 2015 (Fantastic Fest)
- Running time: 78 minutes
- Country: United States
- Language: English

Darling is a 2015 American psychological horror film written and directed by Mickey Keating. It stars Lauren Ashley Carter as a young woman who slowly goes insane after becoming a caretaker in a large New York City apartment. It also features Sean Young, Brian Morvant, Larry Fessenden, Helen Rogers, and John Speredakos. It premiered at the 2015 Fantastic Fest and released to limited theatres in the United States and VOD in April 2016.

== Plot ==
The film takes place over six chapters.

=== Chapter 1: Her ===
Madame leaves Darling alone as the new caretaker of an old home in New York City. Before leaving, Madame warns that the previous caretaker threw herself off the balcony. Darling becomes fascinated with an inverted cross necklace she finds in a dresser drawer. She also finds a locked door at the end of a hallway, but Madame forbids her by phone from opening it. Darling unknowingly drops the necklace while grocery shopping and a man returns it to her on the street. It is implied that she recognizes him. After experiencing a panic attack, Darling follows the man and finds out where he lives.

=== Chapter 2: Invocation ===
Darling begins experiencing hallucinatory visions. Noises in the home lead her outside to the balcony where she finds a Latin proverb "Abyssus abyssum invocat" which means "Deep calls to deep" ("hell calls hell" or "one misstep leads to another") scrawled into a wood panel.

=== Chapter 3: THRILLS!! ===
Darling follows the man from earlier to THRILLS!!, a local lounge. They share drinks together before Darling invites him back to her house. The man mentions how the house is said to be haunted and rumored to have been a place where someone once tried conjuring the devil. Darling suddenly stabs the man to death mid-conversation, and begins raving that she is taking revenge on a man named Henry Sullivan who cannot be allowed to live because of what he did to her "that night".

=== Chapter 4: Demon ===
Darling tapes a bag over the man’s head, suffocating him, and puts his body in the tub. Darling goes to sleep, clutching the cross necklace to her chest and reciting "Abyssus abyssum invocat". Darling dreams of the dead man attacking her in her bed.

=== Chapter 5: Inferno ===
Darling finds a card on the man that identifies him as Henry Sullivan. After sawing off his head and limbs and putting them in a bag, Darling checks the ID again and sees that the name now reads James Abbott.

=== Chapter 6: The Caretaker ===
Madame calls after discovering that Darling’s reference, Dr. Abbott, was never her employer; Darling replies calmly that the doctor says she's "all right now". Madame implores Darling to leave her home. Darling asks if the locked room upstairs was the site of the devil conjuring told of in local tales. Madame doesn't answer. Darling replies, “I think I’ll become one of your ghost stories now.” Darling breaks down the locked door upstairs and is horrified by what she sees, but it is not shown to the audience. Darling paces the hall, cuts up all of her clothes and dons the cross necklace. A woman arrives at the house with two police officers, presumably having been alerted by Madame via telephone, and they find the bag of body parts after entering with a spare key. Darling hears them, climbs up to the roof and jumps off - her visions now coming full circle.

In the post-credits scene, Madame hires another young woman as the home's new caretaker, reciting the same lines she spoke to Darling upon their first meeting.

== Cast ==
- Lauren Ashley Carter as Darling
- Sean Young as Madame
- Brian Morvant as The Man
- Larry Fessenden as Officer Maneretti
- Helen Rogers as the new girl
- John Speredakos as Officer Clayton

== Production ==
Shooting took place in New York City over twelve days. Keating was influenced by Roman Polanski, including Rosemary's Baby, The Tenant, and Repulsion. After being contacted by Keating, Fessenden joined as an executive producer and brought on Young. New York was chosen as a location to emphasize the alienation and detachment felt by Carter's character. After watching 1960s horror films while writing Darling, Keating said it felt "right and necessary" to shoot in monochrome.

== Release ==
Darling premiered at Fantastic Fest on September 26, 2015. It was subsequently picked up for distribution by Screen Media Films, who released it theatrically in New York and Toronto on April 1, 2016. It debuted on video on demand a week later.

== Reception ==
Rotten Tomatoes, a review aggregator, reports that 71% of 24 surveyed critics gave the film a positive review; the average rating is 6.3/10. The site's consensus reads, "Darling's classic inspirations will be obvious to hardcore horror fans, but they're deployed with enough wit and flair to stand on their own chilling merits". Metacritic rated it 60/100 based on nine reviews. Frank Scheck of The Hollywood Reporter wrote, "Lauren Ashley Carter delivers a riveting turn in this stylish but derivative horror film." Richard Whittaker of The Austin Chronicle described it as an "unabashed love letter to Roman Polanski's early English-language work", though Whittaker said that Keating has developed his own recognizable style, which constantly challenges audiences. Madeleine Koestner of Fangoria rated it 3/4 stars and called it "unsettling, distressing and mesmerizing". Koestner praised the film's atmosphere and intensity, saying that it makes up for the lack of character development. Trace Thurman of Bloody Disgusting rated it 4/5 stars and wrote, "Darling may not provide any easy answers, but it is a trippy, hypnotic ride through the mind of a woman who is slowly losing it." Ari Drew of Dread Central rated it 4/5 stars and wrote that although the film "owes a debt to early Polanski", it is refreshing and "never feels cheap in its homage". Alex Williams of Twitch Film wrote, "Darling lacks the patience of its biggest influences, and its overbearing attempts to frighten the audience end up derailing an otherwise moody and intriguing effort."
