= Psychopaths (film) =

- Theatrical release poster
- Directed by: Mickey Keating
- Written by: Mickey Keating
- Produced by: Jenn Wexler; William Day Frank; Mickey Keating; Cam McLellan; Al Lewison
- Starring: Ashley Bell; James Landry Hébert; Mark Kassen; Angela Trimbur; Ivana Shein; Jeremy Gardner; Samuel D. Zimmerman
- Cinematography: Mac Fisken
- Edited by: Valerie Krulfeifer
- Production companies: Glass Eye Pix; Sorrow Entertainment; High Windows Films
- Distributed by: Samuel Goldwyn Films
- Release dates: April 20, 2017 (Tribeca); December 1, 2017 (United States)
- Running time: 85 minutes
- Country: United States
- Language: English

Psychopaths is a 2017 American horror film written and directed by Mickey Keating. It stars an ensemble cast that includes Ashley Bell, James Landry Hébert, Mark Kassen, Angela Trimbur, Ivana Shein, Jeremy Gardner and Samuel D. Zimmerman. It had its world premiere at the Tribeca Film Festival on April 20, 2017. It was released on December 1, 2017, by Samuel Goldwyn Films.

== Premise ==
A recently executed murderer's soul possesses and inspires an ensemble of psychopathic killers to attack the city of Los Angeles over the course of one night, crossing each others' paths along the way.

== Cast ==
- Ashley Bell as an escaped mental patient
- Angela Trimbur as a torturer who targets men
- Mark Kassen
- Ivana Shein
- James Landry Hébert as a strangler
- Jeremy Gardner as a psychopathic cop
- Helen Rogers as a housewife
- Larry Fessenden
- Sam Zimmerman as a contract killer

== Production ==
Shooting began on February 15, 2016 and concluded by March 2016. In April, Keating reported that he was editing the film.

== Release ==
Psychopaths premiered at the Tribeca Film Festival on April 20, 2017. Shortly after, Samuel Goldwyn Films acquired distribution rights to the film. It is scheduled to be released on December 1, 2017.

== Reception ==
Although praising Keating's ability to avoid retreading previous films, Brad Miska of Bloody Disgusting criticized the lack of characterization and called Psychopaths "a beautiful work of art that's void of any real meaning". Miska highlighted Trimbur's character and said she should have been the focus of the film. Michael Gingold of Rue Morgue described the film as a homage to Keating's directorial influences. Commenting on the acting, Gingold wrote, "More than just a technical exercise, Psychopaths is also a showcase for several different styles of unhinged acting, which is what truly holds the attention." Gingold concluded with the hope that Bell and Keating will continue collaborating.
