= Offseason (film) =

2021 horror film

- Poster
- Directed by: Mickey Keating
- Written by: Mickey Keating
- Produced by: Eric B. Fleischman; Maurice Fadida
- Starring: Jocelin Donahue; Joe Swanberg; Richard Brake; Melora Walters
- Cinematography: Mac Fisken
- Edited by: Valerie Krulfeifer
- Music by: Shayfer James
- Production companies: Defiant Studios; Kodiak Pictures; Sunset Junction Entertainment
- Distributed by: RLJE Films
- Release dates: March 17, 2021 (SXSW); March 11, 2022 (United States)
- Running time: 83 minutes
- Country: United States
- Language: English

Offseason is a 2021 supernatural horror film written and directed by Mickey Keating. It stars Jocelin Donahue, Joe Swanberg, Richard Brake, and Melora Walters. The film premiered at South by South West in March 2021 before a theatrical release by RLJE Films on March 11, 2022.

== Synopsis ==
After her mother's grave is destroyed, Marie travels to a desolate island where she is buried and finds herself trapped in a nightmare.

== Cast ==
- Jocelin Donahue as Marie Aldrich
- Joe Swanberg as George Darrow
- Richard Brake as Bridge Man
- Melora Walters as Ava Aldrich
- Jeremy Gardner as The Fisherman
- April Linscott as Miss Emily
- Jonathan Medina as Mr. Clayton, Esq.
- Eliza Shin as Ms. Gardner, Esq.
- Jess Varley as Young Woman
- Andrew Vilar as Young Man
- Larry Fessenden as H. Grierson
- Amanda Grace Benitez as Anne
- Ken Luzadder as Old Man
- Anthony Azar as Bartender
- Andrew Varenhorst as The Man From The Sea

== Production ==
Mickey Keating began work on the film in 2018 after reading "A Rose for Emily" and "The Summer People". The director contacted producer Eric B. Fleischman as well as Jocelin Donahue and Joe Swanberg to star in the film. Donahue worked with Keating to further flesh out her character's backstory. Richard Brake and Melora Walters were unveiled as additional cast members in February 2020.

Principal photography took place in New Smyrna, Florida and concluded by February 2020.

== Release ==
Offseason premiered at South by Southwest on March 17, 2021. The following month, the film was acquired by RLJE Films. Offseason released through video on demand and received a limited theatrical on March 11, 2022.

The film was released on Blu-ray and DVD on June 14, 2022.

== Reception ==
On review aggregator Rotten Tomatoes, Offseason holds an approval rating of 68% based on 65 reviews, with an average rating of 6.1/10. The site's critical consensus reads "Led by strong performances from Jocelin Donahue and Melora Walters, Offseason is a solid supernatural horror story that casts a sneaky spell." On Metacritic, the film holds an average rating of 55 out of 100, indicating "mixed or average reviews".

Tomris Laffly of Variety wrote the film "offers some genuinely spine-tingling images and sounds that will keep midnight audiences on their toes until the end." Amy Nicholson of FilmWeek called the film "small and occasionally strong" and reminiscent of The Twilight Zone. Writing for Bloody Disgusting, Trace Thurman said "Offseason and the plot doesn’t have enough meat on its bones to justify its already scant 80-minute runtime." Of Dread Central, Michelle Swope wrote "some genuinely creepy visuals, and a psychotic performance from Richard Brake make Offseason a dark and unnerving experience."

For Slant Magazine, Steven Scaife wrote "if you’re not building something new from familiar pieces then you’re just regurgitating old ideas." Katie Rife of The A.V. Club said "while the filmmaker excels at flashy camera tricks and isolated moments of terror, this film—like all of his others—never quite takes off." Nick Allen for RogerEbert.com called the film "mind-bogglingly unoriginal" and "frustrating".
