= Louis Herthum =

American actor, producer (b. 1956)

- Born: Louis W. Herthum; July 5, 1956 (age 69); Baton Rouge, Louisiana, U.S.
- Occupations: Actor, producer
- Years active: 1978–present

Louis W. Herthum (born July 5, 1956) is an American actor and producer. Herthum has worked as a stage, television, and film actor, and he has also appeared in national television commercials. He is best known for his recurring role as Dep. Andy Broom on Murder, She Wrote and Peter Abernathy in the HBO television series Westworld.

== Early life ==
Louis W. Herthum was born and raised in Baton Rouge, Louisiana.

== Career ==
=== Acting ===
Herthum started his career as an actor in 1978, performing in local theater, local and regional TV commercials and print advertisements. In 1991, after years of being an unfamiliar actor, he joined the cast of Murder, She Wrote; he played Deputy Andy Broom in 25 episodes of the show's final five seasons (1991–96). Before he played Broom, he played two other unrelated characters, beginning in 1989, his first television roles. He remained close to Angela Lansbury until her death in 2022. In 2015, he said in an interview that he saw her steal the show in the play, Blithe Spirit, at the Ahmanson Theater in Los Angeles, California, at the age of 89.

He has appeared in such television series as CSI, CSI: Miami, CSI: NY, NCIS, Criminal Minds, True Blood (joining the cast in 2011 for 7 of its 5th season's episodes), JAG, The Mentalist, Men of a Certain Age, True Detective, Treme, Breaking Bad, and The Gates. He appears in two ongoing television series during 2016. He plays Omar on the Netflix series Longmire, and Peter Abernathy, a host (robot) on the HBO series Westworld. After appearing in a recurring role in the first season of Westworld, Herthum was promoted to main cast in the second season. In June 2021, he joined the main cast on the Amazon Prime Video series The Peripheral.

His film credits include In the Electric Mist, The Curious Case of Benjamin Button, I Love You Phillip Morris, American Inquisition, The Open Road, Tekken, 12 Rounds, Seconds Apart and The Last Exorcism.

=== Producing ===
In March 1996, after completing his final episode of Murder, She Wrote, Herthum turned his attention to film production and returned to his hometown of Baton Rouge to produce Favorite Son, his first feature film. Since then, his Baton Rouge-based production company, Ransack Films, has produced five feature films, one feature-length documentary (The Season Before Spring) and one short film ("The Grapevine").

== Filmography ==
=== Film ===
Year	Title	Role	Notes
1982	The Toy	Man in Box	Uncredited
1997	Favorite Son	Lucas Beauchamp	
2001	The Ghost	Browner	
2002	Now You Know	Customer	
2005	The Rain Makers	Art	
2006	Road House 2	Deputy Garland Hendricks	Direct-to-video
2006	Red Ridge	Ness	
2006	Nola	Gannon	
2007	Pride	Coach Logan - 1964	
2007	The Mist	Colonel	Uncredited
2008	Lockjaw: Rise of the Kulev Serpent	Alan Cade	Direct-to-video
2008	American Violet	Officer Smith	
2008	Mutants	Griff Theriot	
2008	The Curious Case of Benjamin Button	Man at Caroline's Party	
2009	I Love You Phillip Morris	Doctor	
2009	In the Electric Mist	Doobie Patout	
2009	12 Rounds	BEP Employee	
2009	The Open Road	Surgeon	
2010	Wrong Side of Town	Briggs	Direct-to-video
2010	Tekken	Tekken Police Officer #2	
2010	The Last Exorcism	Louis Sweetzer	
2010	Circle of Pain	Willy	Direct-to-video
2011	Seconds Apart	Owen Trimble	
2012	Cheesecake Casserole	Howard	
2013	Inventing Adam	Adam's Father	
2013	The Last Exorcism Part II	Louis	
2014	Atlas Shrugged Part III: Who Is John Galt?	Wesley Mouch	
2015	Truth	Bill Hollowell	
2017	Be Afraid	Chief Martin Collins	
2018	I Still See You	Dr. Martin Steiner	
2018	The Possession of Hannah Grace	Man / Killer / Grainger	
2018	City of Lies	City Attorney Stone	

=== Television ===
Year	Title	Role	Notes
1980	Beulah Land	Party Guest / Wounded Rebel Soldier	2 episodes
1984	Louisiana	Fellow student	Television film
1989	Hardball	Margolis	Episode: "Which Witch Is Witch?"
1989–1996	Murder, She Wrote	Various roles	25 episodes
1990	Grand Slam	Court Room Security Officer	Television film
1991	Columbo	Technician	Episode: "Caution: Murder Can Be Hazardous to Your Health"
1995	Vanishing Son	Lloyd	Episode: "Birds of Paradise"
1996	The Tomorrow Man	Air Force Officer	Television film; uncredited
1998	Vengeance Unlimited	Conner Gulch	2 episodes
2001, 2003	JAG	Communications Officer / Capt. Gilbert	2 episodes
2006	For One Night	Sheriff Taylor	Television film
2007	The Riches	Trooper Yardley	Episode: "Pilot"
2007	Ruffian	Dr. Harthill	Television film
2008	Racing for Time	Ralph Connelly	Television film
2008	K-Ville	Michael Shanley	Episode: "Game Night"
2008	Living Proof	Dr. Banks	Television film
2009	Men of a Certain Age	Coach Ford	Episode: "Mind's Eye"
2010	Treme	Sheriff Don Babineaux	Episode: "Right Place, Wrong Time"
2010	Breaking Bad	Realtor	Episode: "Full Measure"
2010	The Gates	Simon Ford	2 episodes
2010	Cigarettes & Nylons	David Hunkey	Television film
2010	The Defenders	Joe Rodgers	Episode: "Nevada v. Rodgers"
2010	Journey to Promethea	Ari	Television film
2011	The Mentalist	Chief Arnold Nail	Episode: "Red Alert"
2011	CSI: Crime Scene Investigation	Detective Lucas Martin	Episode: "The List"
2011	Criminal Minds	Chief Theirs	Episode: "Hanley Waters"
2011	NCIS	Ernest McCormick	Episode: "Restless"
2011	CSI: Miami	Grant Wyatt	Episode: "Blown Away"
2012	True Blood	JD	7 episodes
2012	CSI: NY	Capt. Curtis Smith	Episode: "Reignited"
2012–2016	Longmire	Omar	8 episodes
2013	Revenge	Agent Gentry	Episode: "Truth: Part 2"
2014	Sleepy Hollow	General George Washington	Episode: "The Indispensable Man"
2014	True Detective	Terry Guidry	Episode: "Haunted Houses"
2014	Stalker	Jimmy Lambert	Episode: "Manhunt"
2015	Justified	Detective Willits	Episode: "Fugitive Number One"
2016	The Night Stalker	Jed	Television film
2016–2018	Westworld	Peter Abernathy	10 episodes
2017	Training Day	Henry Hollister	Episode: "Blurred Lines"
2017	Downward Dog	Wade	2 episodes
2017	Narcos	Senator Toyle	Episode: "Follow the Money"
2017	Law & Order True Crime	Sgt. Edmonds	Episode: "The Menendez Murders: Episode 1"
2017, 2018	Chicago Med	Pat Halstead	2 episodes
2018	Electric Dreams	Supervisor	Episode: "Kill All Others"
2018	Hawaii Five-0	CIA Agent Matt Harlow	Episode: "He Lokomaika'i Ka Manu O Kaiona"
2018	Lucifer	Lt. John Decker	Episode: "Once Upon a Time"
2018	Chicago Fire	Pat Halstead	Episode: "Going to War"
2019	What/If	Foster	9 episodes
2020	FBI: Most Wanted	Blake Wilson	Episode: "Getaway"
2020	Dirty John	Jack Earley	Episode: "Perception Is Reality"
2020–2021	All Rise	Sheriff Wayne McCarthy	5 episodes
2021–present	Home Before Dark	Sheriff Frank Briggs Sr.	12 episodes
2021	Hacks	Dennis	2 episodes
2022	The Peripheral	Corbell Pickett	8 episodes
2025–2026	The Night Agent	Jacob Monroe	Main role (season 2 and 3); 20 episodes

=== Video games ===
Year	Title	Role	Notes
2013	DmC: Devil May Cry	Mundus / Bob Barbas	Voice
