= Carnage Park =

- Theatrical release poster
- Directed by: Mickey Keating
- Written by: Mickey Keating
- Starring: Ashley Bell; Darby Stanchfield; Pat Healy; Alan Ruck
- Cinematography: Mac Fisken
- Music by: Giona Ostinelli
- Production company: Diablo Entertainment
- Distributed by: IFC Midnight
- Release dates: January 26, 2016 (Sundance Film Festival); July 1, 2016 (United States)
- Running time: 90 minutes
- Country: United States
- Language: English

Carnage Park is a 2016 American crime horror thriller film directed and written by Mickey Keating. The film stars Ashley Bell, Darby Stanchfield, Pat Healy, and Alan Ruck.

Keating described Carnage Park as being a nod to films by Sam Peckinpah and Peter Watkins that were made in the 1970s, and he built the film around that concept.

== Plot ==
In 1978, two thieves, "Scorpion Joe" and Lenny, escape into the desert with a hostage, Vivian, after a failed heist. Lenny dies of a gunshot wound suffered during their escape, and Joe forces Vivian to help him dispose of Lenny's body. After a failed escape attempt, Vivian explains that she was at the bank to seek a loan to save her family's farm. As she covertly reaches for a switchblade on the floor of Joe's car, an unseen assailant shoots out one of the car's tires. Joe handcuffs Vivian to the steering wheel and exits the car, boasting that he will kill whoever shot at them. The hidden sniper kills Joe, then drives up to talk to Vivian. The sniper, Wyatt Moss, tells her that she is trespassing on private property, and insists he had a legal right to kill Joe. Vivian begs him to free her, but he instead knocks her out with a drug.

Wyatt's brother, the sheriff, visits Wyatt's compound to ask if he has seen Vivian. Wyatt denies any knowledge of her, and his brother warns him that she is too well known for her murder to be hushed up. When Vivian wakes, she is handcuffed to Joe's corpse in the car. She drags the corpse out of the car and uses a rock to smash the handcuff. Once free, she wanders toward a PA system that has a record player attached. When she plays the album on it, a recording of a siren, Wyatt takes several shots at her. She takes off running, pursued by Wyatt. After avoiding a trapped pit, Vivian finds an apparently dead woman who is holding a shiv. Vivian grabs the weapon, startling the woman into semi-consciousness. As Vivian attempts to revive her, Wyatt shoots and kills the woman. The sheriff discovers Lenny's body and loudly announces that he is entering the compound. While Wyatt is distracted, Vivian surprises him with an attack, takes his rifle from him, and shoots him.

Leaving Wyatt for dead with his rifle, Vivian looks for an exit from the fenced-in compound. She follows the cries of an injured man, discovering Travis stuck in a bear trap. Though she frees him, he is unable to move. Travis laments that he is still going to die, as the entire compound is surrounded by miles of electric fencing. Vivian says she believes she has killed Wyatt and promises to return with help. Nearby, she finds a shack that is filled with grisly trophies, such as human ears. Wyatt taunts her on a CB radio, saying he knows she is in the shack, and she hears a gunshot. As Wyatt laughs, she yells at him, drawing the attention of the sheriff, who is investigating the compound. As he enters the shack, Vivian kills him, only to be horrified that it is not Wyatt. Wyatt further taunts her, shooting at her as she attempts to pick up the sheriff's nearby pistol. Once she grabs it, she flees through a trapdoor that leads to a mine shaft.

Wyatt chases Vivian through the mine, which contains many dead bodies, dolls, and a PA system that plays distorted music. Vivian hides among the dead bodies, then engages in a shoot-out with Wyatt, which causes a cave-in near him. The lights go out, and Wyatt's taunts her with manic laughter and militaristic rants. Vivian reaches the end of the mine and breaks through a boarded up exit. As she emerges into the daylight, she laughs hysterically. A note says that Vivian escaped to safety, and dozens of bodies were eventually found in the compound; however, Wyatt was never captured.

== Cast ==
- Ashley Bell as Vivian Fontaine
- James Landry Hébert as Scorpion Joe
- Michael Villar as Lenny
- Bob Bancroft as Delbert Oates, the bank manager
- Darby Stanchfield as Ellen San Diego
- Pat Healy as Wyatt Moss
- Alan Ruck - Sheriff Moss
- Larry Fessenden as Travis

== Production ==
On May 5, 2015, it was announced that Ashley Bell, Darby Stanchfield, Pat Healy, and Alan Ruck were cast in the leading roles in the film set in 1970s. Filming began on May 11, 2015 in Los Angeles.

== Release ==
The film was initially screened at the January 2016 Sundance Film Festival and in March it was screened at the 2016 South by Southwest in Austin, Texas. IFC Midnight has the U.S. distribution rights and set the release date to July 1, 2016.

== Reception ==
Ben Kenigsberg of Variety wrote that Carnage Park "lands well south of John Waters in its try-anything-for-a-reaction pretensions" and that "Box office-wise, the movie has the potential to lure only the least suspecting of viewers." Carnage Park currently has 61% on Rotten Tomatoes based on 23 critic reviews. On Roger Ebert's website, Sheila O'Malley reviewed the film, calling it "...an extremely empty experience."

The movie has been compared to work by Quentin Tarantino. Indiewire's David Ehrlich panned the movie in his review. He said the film was like a train "...running out of track."
