= Giona Ostinelli =

Swiss–Italian composer

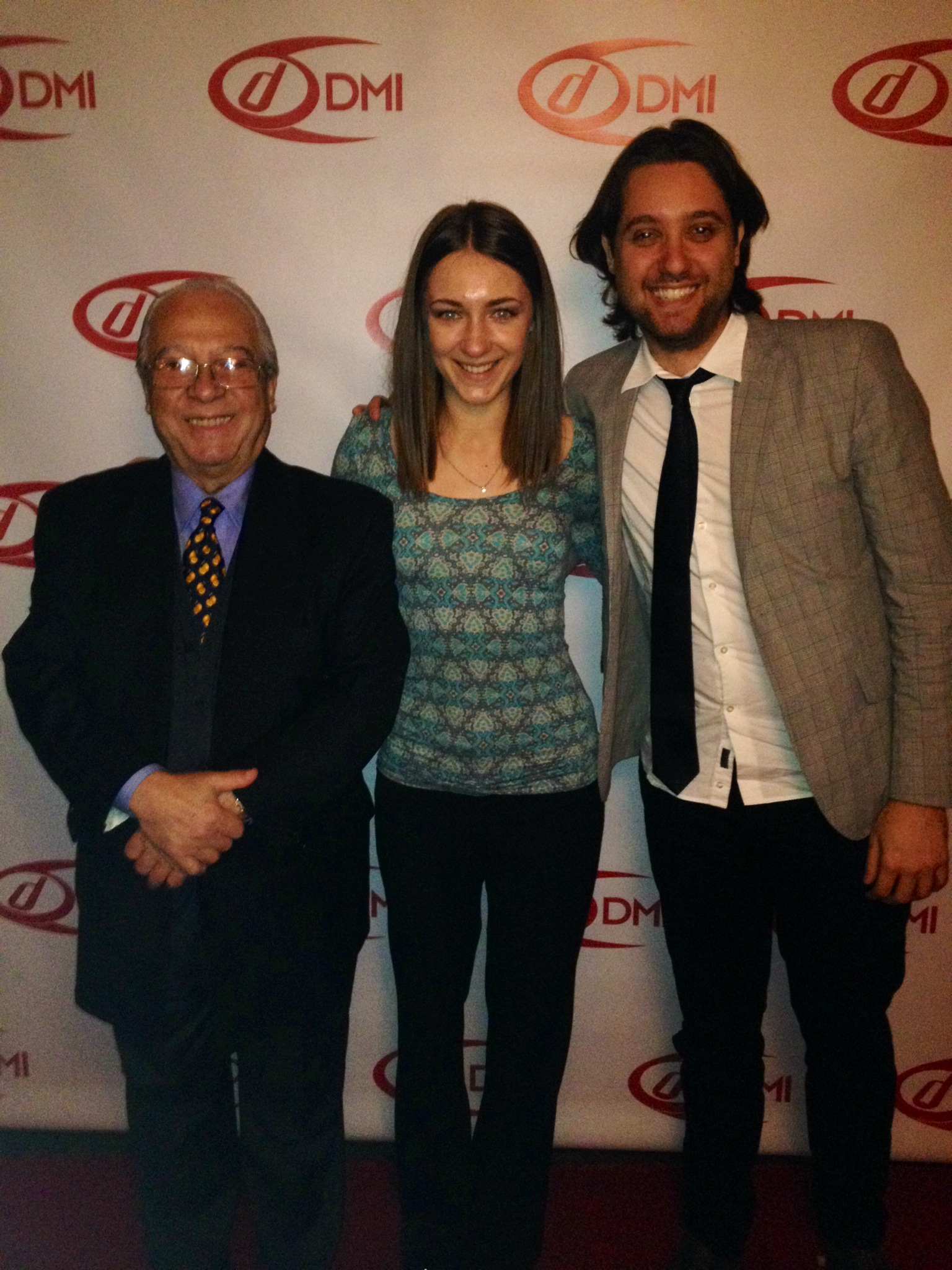
- From left to right: Jorge Calandrelli, Sonya Belousova, and Ostinelli at a 2014 Grammy Party

Background information
- Born: 12 March 1986 (age 39); Vacallo, Ticino, Switzerland
- Genres: Film score; electronic; classical; rock; pop
- Occupations: Composer, producer, musician
- Website: belousova-ostinelli.com

Giona Ostinelli (Italian pronunciation: [ˈdʒɔːna ostiˈnɛlli]; born 12 March 1986) is a Swiss–Italian composer who resides and works in Los Angeles.

Ostinelli is best known for his critically acclaimed work on Netflix's hit fantasy series The Witcher. The Witcher Original Soundtrack Album, featuring songs and score composed and produced by Ostinelli and his scoring partner Sonya Belousova, has achieved commercial success and critical recognition. The album debuted #1 on iTunes Top Soundtracks with the enormously successful hit single "Toss A Coin To Your Witcher" #1 on iTunes Top Soundtrack Songs and #1 on Billboard Digital Rock Songs Sales. The album charted #4 on iTunes for Top Albums (behind only Eminem, Breaking Benjamin, and Chase Rice) and in the top ten in every major territory in the world. "Toss A Coin To Your Witcher" broke into the Billboard charts: Billboard Top Current Albums, Billboard Top Album Sales, Billboard Top Soundtrack Albums, and The Billboard 200. The song has quickly become a viral sensation and a worldwide phenomenon.Thrillist "the biggest banger of 2020," Entertainment Weekly "a viral hit," Esquire "the best part of Netflix's series," The Verge "the hit song of the season," while Forbes stated that "the viral earworm became just as famous as the show."

Ostinelli has written scores for over 35 feature films that premiered at Sundance Film Festival, Tribeca Film Festival, Cannes International Film Festival, South by Southwest Film Festival, among others. Ostinelli's score for breakout psychological thriller Darling released by Lakeshore Records and fan favorite Mondo Records has been described as "one of the most interesting and innovative soundscapes". His soundtrack for POD has been shortlisted for the Academy Awards for Best Original Score.

Ostinelli is also known for his work on Tobio: The Puppet Master (Тобио: Мастер Кукол) – a theater production directed by George Dolmazyan (Георгий Долмазян), recipient of the Russian Ministry of Culture Award. Tobio: The Puppet Master premiered on 23 April 2013 at the Moscow State Theater U Nikitskikh Vorot (Московский Государственный Театр у Никитских Ворот) in Moscow, Russia.

The Huffington Post described Ostinelli as "an innovator with "surprise" coded into his DNA".

== Early life and education ==
Ostinelli was born in Vacallo, Switzerland. His mother, Mariella Ostinelli Socchi, is a well-known Swiss painter.

He started playing drums at the age of 5 and piano at the age of 9. He holds degrees in film scoring from Berklee College of Music and University of Southern California Scoring for Motion Pictures and Television program where he was a selected protege of renowned film composer Alan Silvestri.

That was so special to me because I grew up listening to his [Alan's] music and never thought that one day I would have such a fantastic opportunity of meeting him. Alan and I spoke a lot, especially about the business side and inner relations of the industry, which was incredibly valuable for me at that early stage of my career.

== Career ==
=== Film and television music ===
Ostinelli's soundtrack for The Mist was released in 2017 by BMG Records. The record contains exclusively Ostinelli's score for the show. Based on the Stephen King's novella of the same name, The Mist has been reimagined for television by Christian Torpe and stars Frances Conroy, Alyssa Sutherland and Morgan Spector.

In 2016 Ostinelli wrote the score for Darling, a breakout psychological thriller directed by Mickey Keating starring Lauren Ashley Carter, Sean Young and Larry Fessenden. Ostinelli's original soundtrack was released by Lakeshore Records, with fan favorite Mondo Records releasing a special edition on vinyl. The score received a wide critical acclaim being praised by Film Music Critics as "one of the most interesting and innovative soundscapes", The New York Times described it as "a soundtrack alternating among ambient Lynchian strains and snatches of hard-core rock", and IndieWire stated "what builds the unsettling atmosphere in Darling is the fantastic sound work that enhances the imagery on screen".

In 2016 Ostinelli scored Keating's action-thriller Carnage Park that received its world premiere at Sundance and played at the SXSW. The A.V. Club raved: "Carnage Park's score is full of unnerving dissonance, fueling the sense of dread... But for all the off-kilter instrumentation and recording techniques, Ostinelli always keeps a notion of harmony and melody underneath the surface. It's perfect for Carnage Park because the score works on different levels, much like the film." Collider stated that "the sepia color palette pairs perfectly with Keating's shot selection and Giona Ostinelli's original score. Together they manage to cover an especially impressive range between classic western heist flick and sheer nightmare." Carnage Park marks Ostinelli's fourth collaboration with Keating having previously scored Keating's POD, compared to "the best of the X-Files" by Richard Whittaker of The Austin Chronicle. "POD is a solid and nihilistic thriller that will get in your head and under your skin. One of the reasons for this is the music by composer Giona Ostinelli," – writes Sinful Celluloid. Ostinelli's score for POD was shortlisted for the 2016 Academy Awards. Another collaboration of Ostinelli/Keating is Lionsgate's Ritual, "aided greatly by the atmospheric musical score composed by Giona Ostinelli… Ostinelli's soundscape helps the plot move quickly and really gives you chills up the spine during many scenes in the film," – depicts Robyn Andrew of Cryptic Rock.

Ostinelli wrote the score for Two-Bit Waltz starring Academy award nominees William H. Macy and David Paymer, Jared Gilman, Rebecca Pidgeon and Clara Mamet from executive producer Pulitzer Prize winner David Mamet. Directed by Clara Mamet Two Bit Waltz premiered at the 2013 Tribeca Film Festival with Danny Gonzalez of The Examiner calling Ostinelli's score "musical magic". Same year Indigenous featuring original score by Ostinelli premiered at Tribeca. From Kilburn Media and producers of Chef and End of The Tour Indigenous was described as "the most intriguing film screening at this year's Tribeca Film Festival" by Bloody Disgusting.

Ostinelli's other notable film credits include M.F.A. starring Francesca Eastwood and Emmy nominee Clifton Collins Jr., The Boat Builder starring Emmy winner Christopher Lloyd and Golden Globe nominee Jane Kaczmarek, Like Me starring Addison Timlin and Larry Fessenden, Carter High starring Emmy winner Charles S. Dutton, MTV Movie Award winner Vivica A. Fox, Pooch Hall and BET Award winner David Banner from the executive producer and former NFL star Greg Ellis, How Sarah Got Her Wings starring Teen Choice Award nominee Derek Theler and Lindsey Gort, Christmas Switch starring MTV Movie Award winner William Baldwin and nominee Denise Richards, Little Loopers starring Grammy nominee Natalie Imbruglia, Golden Globe nominee Rob Morrow and Mark Moses, Ghost Squad starring Emmy nominee Kevin Nealon, The Remains starring Todd Lowe, Brooke Butler and Maria Olsen, Recovery starring Rachel DiPillo, Samuel Larsen, James Landry Hébert and Kirby Bliss Blanton, Opening Night starring Grammy nominee Cheyenne Jackson and Anthony Rapp, Little Miss Perfect starring Lilla Crawford.

In 2015 Nickelodeon premiered The Massively Mixed-Up Middle School Mystery with original score by Giona Ostinelli. The Massively Mixed-Up Middle School Mystery premiered #1 ranked program at its time in re K6-11 demographic. Same year Ostinelli scored CBBC TV pilot Zombies Next Door.

Ostinelli has been invited to contribute original music and orchestrate many films and television series including Homeland (Showtime), Elementary (CBS), Game Change (HBO), 24: Live Another Day (FOX), Minority Report (FOX), Community (ABC), New Girl (FOX), Happy Endings (ABC), Bones (FOX), Before I Go To Sleep (Millennium Films, StudioCanal), Diary of A Wimpy Kid: Dog Days (FOX), Abduction (Lionsgate), among others.

=== Music for theater ===
In 2012 Ostinelli was commissioned by the MOST Theater (Театр МОСТ) of Moscow, Russia to write an original score for Tobio: The Puppet Master (Тобио: Мастер Кукол), directed by George Dolmazyan (Георгий Долмазян), the recipient of the Russian Ministry of Culture Award. Tobio: The Puppet Master premiered on 23 April 2013 at the Moscow State Theater U Nikitskikh Vorot (Московский Государственный Театр у Никитских Ворот). The commercial announcements of the show heavily advertised the score being "written for the show by Hollywood composer Giona Ostinelli" ("музыка, написанная для спектакля голливудским композитором Джионой Остинелли").

"Tobio reminds me of a beautiful film with sudden transitions and change of scenes. One – and there's a foggy city street and scurrying around shadows with huge umbrellas. Two – and in stuffy scarlet light there're Eastern beauties ringing their bracelets dancing for their Peacock king. Three – and there's funny corps de ballet flying around a diva soloist and quarreling opera prima donnas. George Dolmazyan with mild irony and flawless taste builds a spectacular, bright and atmospheric show," – describes Alisa Nikolskaya of Teatralnaya Afisha (Театральная Афиша). ("Тобио" напоминает красивый фильм с мгновенной сменой кадров. Раз – и появляются туманная городская улица и снующие тени с огромными зонтами. Два – и вот уже в душном алом свете восточные красавицы звенят браслетами, танцуя для своего Короля-Павлина. Три – и смешной кордебалет порхает вокруг красавца-солиста и ссорящихся оперных примадонн. Георгий Долмазян с мягкой иронией и безупречным вкусом выстраивает эффектное, яркое, атмосферное зрелище.)

== Works ==
=== Film ===
Year	Title	Director	Production company
2025	Red Sonja	M. J. Bassett	Millennium Media, Cinelou Films, Mark Canton Productions, Nu Boyana Film Studios, Dynamite Entertainment
2015	The Boat Builder	Arnold Grossman	Blue Creek Pictures, Reunion Films
2015	Carter High	Arthur Muhammad	Sweet Chariot Productions
2015	Darling	Mickey Keating	Glass Eye Pix, Alexander Groupe
2015	Carnage Park	Mickey Keating	Diablo Entertainment
2015	How Sarah Got Her Wings	Gary Entin and Edmund Entin	MarVista Entertainment
2015	Christmas Trade	Joel Souza	Brand Inc. Entertainment
2015	POD	Mickey Keating	Alexander Groupe, Illium Pictures
2015	The Remains	Thomas Della Bella	Diablo Entertainment, EBF Productions
2015	Little Miss Perfect	Marlee Roberts	Face Your Beast Productions
2015	Recovery	Darrell Wheat	Diablo Entertainment, EBF Productions
2015	Ghost Squad	Joel Souza	Brand Inc. Entertainment
2015	Little Loopers	Jim Valdez	Brand Inc. Entertainment
2015	Way of The Monkey's Claw	Marc Price	Next Exit
2015	I Am Evangeline	Christine Rogers	Briarbird & Co
2015	Sorrow	Millie Loredo	Film Vérité Productions
2015	Ditch Day Massacre	Joe Hendrick	Water Tree Media
2014	Two-Bit Waltz	Clara Mamet	EBF Productions
2014	Indigenous	Alastair Orr	Kilburn Media
2014	Opening Night	Jack Henry Robbins	EBF Productions, Marina Productions
2014	Happy Camp	Josh Anthony	Flower Films, Hogtown Productions
2014	To Survive	Stephen Folker	No Pebble Films
2014	Happy Log	Gary R. Thieman	GRT Productions
2014	The Night Stalkers	Chelsea Stardust Peters	N/A
2014	Washed	David Hefner	Smoking Cat Films
2013	Ritual	Mickey Keating	EBF Productions, After Dark Films
2013	Magpie	Marc Price	Nowhere Fast Productions
2013	Realm of Souls	Chase Smith	Spirit World Productions
2013	Perdition	Chase Smith	Spirit World Productions
2013	Drowned Out	Nicholas K. Lory and Leo Claussen	Zissou Pictures
2009	Ecoviews: Three Stories From The Chesapeake Bay	Brad Allgood	N/A

=== Television ===
Year	Title	Director / Creator	Production company & Network
2023	One Piece (soundtrack)	Matt Owens and Steven Maeda	Tomorrow Studios / Netflix
2019	The Witcher	Lauren Schmidt Hissrich	The Sean Daniel Company / Netflix
2017	The Mist	Christian Torpe	The Weinstein Company / Spike TV
2015	The Massively Mixed-Up Middle School Mystery	Will Eisenberg and Aaron Eisenberg	Principato-Young Entertainment / Nickelodeon
2014	24: Live Another Day (additional music)	Robert Cochran and Joel Surnow	Imagine Television / FOX
2013	Destroy The Alpha Gammas	Scott Brown	50,000 Ronin Productions
2013	Edge of Normal	Amanda Overton	Wonderly
2013	Red Scare	Lee Citron	N/A
2013	Vigilante	Ciaran Michael Vejby	N/A
2013	Bite Night	Magee Clegg	Subway
2012	Game Change (additional music)	Jay Roach	HBO
2012	Elementary (additional music)	Robert Doherty	Hill of Beans Productions / CBS
2011	Happy Endings (additional music)	David Caspe	Fan Fare / ABC
2011	Community (additional music)	Dan Harmon	Universal Media Studios / NBC
2011	Homeland (additional music)	Alex Gansa and Howard Gordon	Teakwood Lane Productions / Showtime
2011	Second Chance Charlie	Amanda Overton	N/A

=== Theater ===
Premiere	Title	Director	Theater	Artistic Director
23 April 2013	Tobio: The Puppet Master (Тобио: Мастер Кукол)	George Dolmazyan (Георгий Долмазян)	MOST Theater (Театр МОСТ)	Eugene Slavutin (Евгений Славутин)

=== Short films ===
Year	Title
2015	The Girl in the Green Dress
2015	Luke 8
2015	Bed
2015	Kafka
2014	Decay
2014	Zari
2014	Collared
2014	A Hot Night in Georgia
2014	Daniel
2014	Without You
2013	Desdy
2013	After Hours
2013	Unrequited
2013	Shelton's Oasis
2013	Check Out
2013	Conscious
2013	Little Reaper
2012	The Concession
2012	The Chemist
2012	Brutus
2012	Bobby's Girl
2012	Angel
2012	In Half
2012	Most High
2012	My Infinity
2012	The Beast
2011	Birth Mark
2011	Smell My Feet
2011	Getting Back En Pointe
2011	A Made Man
2011	Fallen
2011	Ruby Slippers
2011	Kev Ntsiag To
2011	A Perfect Day
2011	L & R
2011	Out of Hand
2011	The Frog Prince
2011	Wedding Night
2011	Uzak
2011	You Talk And I will Shoot
2010	Due
2010	Breaking The Circle
2010	Pillow Talk
2010	Scal's Big Tip

== Awards and nominations ==
Year	Award	Category	Result
2014	The Streamy Awards	Best Original Score	Nominated
2014	IAWTV International Academy of Web Television Awards	Best Original Score	Nominated
2012	Telly Award	Best Use of Music	Won
