= Hide and Seek (2005 film) =

- Theatrical release poster
- Directed by: John Polson
- Written by: Ari Schlossberg
- Produced by: Barry Josephson
- Starring: Robert De Niro; Dakota Fanning; Famke Janssen; Elisabeth Shue; Amy Irving; Dylan Baker
- Cinematography: Dariusz Wolski
- Edited by: Jeffrey Ford
- Music by: John Ottman
- Production company: Josephson Entertainment
- Distributed by: 20th Century Fox
- Release date: January 28, 2005 (US)
- Running time: 101 minutes
- Country: United States
- Language: English
- Budget: $25 million
- Box office: $127.4 million

Hide and Seek is a 2005 American psychological horror film directed by John Polson and starring Robert De Niro, Dakota Fanning, Elisabeth Shue, Famke Janssen, and Amy Irving. It follows a widowed psychologist and his young daughter, who develops an imaginary friend after their relocation to a rural home in upstate New York.

The film opened in the United States on January 28, 2005, and grossed $127 million worldwide. Rotten Tomatoes cited praise for De Niro and Fanning for their performances, although its consensus called the film "derivative, illogical and somewhat silly". Fanning received an MTV Movie Award for Best Frightened Performance in 2005.

== Plot ==
Following his discovery of the body of his wife Alison in a bathtub after her apparent suicide, Dr. David Callaway, a psychologist, decides to move with his 9-year-old daughter Emily to upstate New York. There, Emily makes an imaginary friend she calls "Charlie". Her friendship with Charlie begins to disturb David when he discovers their cat dead in the bathtub, which Emily claims was a victim of Charlie's. David has nightmares of the New Year's Eve party that occurred the night before Alison's death.

When family friend Dr. Katherine Carson comes to visit David, Emily reveals that Charlie and she have a shared desire to upset her father. David meets Elizabeth Young, a local woman, and her niece Amy, who is the same age as Emily. Hoping to cultivate a healthy friendship for Emily, David arranges for a play date. Amy is eager to become friends and gives one of her dolls to Emily, but the playdate is spoiled when Emily cuts up the doll's face. Emily tells David that she does not need any friends.

David invites Elizabeth to dinner, where Emily acts hostile toward her. Elizabeth tries to make peace with Emily, but when Emily tells her that she is playing hide-and-seek with Charlie, Elizabeth indulges her by pretending to look for Charlie. When she opens the closet, someone bursts out and pushes her out the window to her death.

David asks Emily what happened, but Emily claims that Charlie killed Elizabeth and forced Emily to help him move the body. She tells David the location of the body, but David discovers Elizabeth in the bathtub full of blood (similar to how Alison died). Armed with a knife, David goes outside, where he meets their neighbor and assumes that his neighbor is Charlie. He cuts the neighbor, and the neighbor calls the police.

Back in the house, David finds that although he has been in his study many times, the boxes were never actually unpacked after the move. He realizes that he has dissociative identity disorder and that Charlie is his alter ego.

Whenever "Charlie" would emerge, David would be in his study. He also finally recalls the New Year's Eve party the night before his wife's death. He had caught Alison kissing another guest. "Charlie" was created as a way to express David's rage so that he could murder his wife, something the docile David was too decent to do. Emily knew the entire time about her father's split personality but did not tell him because she was unsure which personality murdered her mother until "Charlie" killed Elizabeth.

Once David realizes the truth, he becomes completely consumed by Charlie, leading him to murder the sheriff who arrives to investigate the neighbor. Emily calls Katherine for help, tricks Charlie, and escapes into the cave, where she originally met Charlie. Katherine takes the gun from the dead sheriff and finds Charlie in the cave, who pretends to be David and attacks her. Katherine begs David to fight his murderous alternate personality, but Charlie says that David no longer exists. Emily emerges, begging Charlie to let Katherine go. Her distraction allows Katherine to shoot Charlie, killing him.

Subsequently, Emily is preparing for school in her new life with Katherine. Emily's drawing of herself with two heads suggests that she might also have dissociative identity disorder.

== Cast ==
- Robert De Niro as David Callaway/Charlie
- Dakota Fanning as Emily Callaway
- Famke Janssen as Dr. Katherine "Kate" Carson
- Elisabeth Shue as Elizabeth Young
- Amy Irving as Allison Callaway
- Dylan Baker as Sheriff Hafferty
- Melissa Leo as Laura
- Robert John Burke as Steven

== Production ==
Albert Hughes was initially signed to direct, making his debut as a solo director, but he left due to creative differences.

== Release ==
20th Century Fox released two versions of the film: the international version and the domestic version. Each version had a different ending. Both the international and domestic versions submitted to the BBFC were actually released to UK cinemas. Both versions passed for a 15 certificate for "moderate horror and violence". The film was released on DVD on July 5, 2005, in the US and on July 25, 2005, in the UK.

=== Alternate endings ===
This film four alternate endings, which are included as bonus features on the film's American DVD release.

Happy Drawing: This is the same as the ending in the U.S. theatrical version, except that the drawing Emily makes of herself has only one head, suggesting that she does not have dissociative identity disorder.

One Final Game: Emily is shown seemingly in a new apartment bedroom, and Katherine's actions mirror those of her mother's at the beginning of the film. She reassures her love to Emily and begins to leave the room. Emily asks Katherine to leave the door open, but Katherine insists she cannot. As the door shuts, a protected window is visible on the door. The next cut is of Katherine locking the door from the outside, revealing this assumed apartment bedroom is actually a hospital room in a children's psychiatric ward. Emily gets out of bed and does a hide-and-seek countdown. She nears the closet, opens the door, and smiles at her own reflection in the mirror.

Emily's Fate (international theatrical ending): This is the same as above in the psychiatric ward, but without the hide-and-seek countdown. This ending is featured in the international theatrical version.

Life with Katherine: With an ending similar to that in the psychiatric ward, it portrays Emily as not in a ward but her new home. After Katherine shuts the door, Emily gets out of bed to play hide-and-seek with her own reflection.

== Reception ==
=== Box office ===
In its opening weekend in US theaters, the film grossed $21 million. The film grossed $51.1 million in the U.S. and $71.5 million internationally, for a worldwide total of $122.7 million.

=== Critical response ===
On Rotten Tomatoes, the film holds an approval rating of 12%, based on 154 reviews, and an average rating of 3.9/10. The website's critical consensus reads: "Robert De Niro and especially Dakota Fanning have earned some praise for their work in Hide and Seek, but critics have called the rest of the film derivative, illogical and somewhat silly." On Metacritic, the film has a weighted average score of 35 out of 100, based on 34 critics, indicating "generally unfavorable" reviews.

Paul Arendt of BBC Movies gave the film two stars out of five, commenting that "Robert De Niro continues his long slide into mediocrity with yet another charmless psycho-thriller".

John Monaghan of Detroit Free Press gave the film a scoring of two out of four, saying, "The second half gets downright silly as the country home turns into a slaughterhouse. What could have been a Sixth Sense-style intelligent thriller heads straight for the drive-in, though it's still handled with considerable skill."

Roger Ebert of the Chicago Sun-Times gave the film two stars out of four, writing, "There was a point in the movie when suddenly everything clicked, and the Law of Economy of Characters began to apply. That is the law that says no actor is in a movie unless his character is necessary."

According to The New York Times, the film was hampered by budgetary restrictions, and the Toronto Sun said that it was one of De Niro's worst.

=== Accolades ===
| Award/association | Year | Category | Recipient(s) and nominee(s) | Result | Ref. |
|---|---|---|---|---|---|
| Fangoria Chainsaw Awards | 2005 | Best Actress | Dakota Fanning | Nominated | |
| Golden Trailer Award | 2005 | Best Horror | Hide and Seek | Won | |
| MTV Movie Awards | 2005 | Best Frightened Performance | Dakota Fanning | Won | |
| Teen Choice Awards | 2005 | Choice Movie: Scream Scene | Elisabeth Shue | Nominated | |
| Teen Choice Awards | 2005 | Choice Movie: Thriller | Hide and Seek | Nominated | |

== See also ==
- Twist ending
