= Mickey Keating (director) =

American film director (born 1990)

- Born: 1990 or 1991 (age 35–36)
- Occupation: Film director
- Years active: 2013–present

Mickey Keating (born 1990) is an American film director and writer. His work includes Ritual, Pod, Darling, Carnage Park, and Psychopaths.

== Career ==
Keating interned at Blumhouse when he was a teenager. His feature directing debut, the horror film Ritual, was produced by Eric Fleischmann, a friend who was also a former intern there. His next two films, Pod, a science fiction-horror film, and Darling, a psychological horror film, were shot nine months apart; both premiered in 2015. Darling was produced by Glass Eye Pix, where Keating had also interned. For Carnage Park, a neo-Western horror film released in 2016, Fleischmann returned to produce. Describing Darling and Carnage Park, Charleston City Paper critic Kevin Young wrote that they show obvious influences from other horror films, but Keating's wide-ranging explorations of the various horror subgenres make him a promising director. Katie Rife of The A.V. Club wrote that although Carnage Park is fun, Keating needs to move beyond stylized homage to avoid the risk of being labeled an imitator. His next film, Psychopaths, completed principal photography in March 2016, and premiered at the Tribeca Film Festival on April 20, 2017. Crooks, a heist film, began shooting in summer 2018. Offseason, a horror film, completed filming in February 2020.

Keating is the host of The Core, a Shudder and Uproxx-produced talk show where he interviews filmmakers about their work and plays with practical effects.

== Style ==
Keating is primarily known for making films that borrow elements from established styles and filmmakers with his own take on them; for example, Darling is influenced by Roman Polanski's "Apartment Trilogy", while Carnage Park is influenced by the thriller films of Sam Peckinpah and Peter Watkins. Keating is also known for unusually fast-paced and flashy uses of inter-titles and captions within his films.

== Filmography ==
- Ritual (2013)
- Pod (2015)
- Darling (2015)
- Carnage Park (2016)
- Psychopaths (2017)
- Offseason (2021)
- Invader (2024)
- Crooks (2026)
