= Campfire Tales =

Campfire Tales may refer to:

- Campfire Tales (1991 film), an American anthology horror film
- Campfire Tales (1997 film), an American anthology horror film
