= Documentary swarm =

A documentary swarm is one of the terms used for the technique of creating audio/video media content that combines documentary film, and citizen journalism. The concept was first utilized by Martin Kunert and Eric Manes's 2004 theatrical film Voices of Iraq where 150 DV cameras were sent to Iraq during the war and used by Iraqis to film themselves.

The technique uses a number of inexpensive digital video cameras and distributes them into a group of people who produce the footage that will later be edited into one or more packages of content. The raw footage is edited by a single person, a group of people, or edited into multiple media texts by multiple participants.

The earliest reference to the idea of a documentary swarm is possibly on a blog by 'Raccoon', although it is similar in nature to such projects as Zana Briski's Kids With Cameras.

== See also ==
Digital cinematography
