= UFCU =

UFCU may refer to:

- UFCU Disch-Falk Field, the baseball field of the University of Texas at Austin
- United Federal Credit Union, a credit union in Michigan
- University Federal Credit Union, a credit union in Utah
- University Federal Credit Union Texas, a credit union in Austin, TX
