= James Felix McKenney =

American writer, director, producer and actor

- Born: May 27, 1968 (age 58); New Haven, Connecticut, United States
- Occupations: Film director, producer, writer, actor

James Felix McKenney (born May 27, 1968) is an American writer, director, producer and actor, raised in Saco, Maine.

== Career ==
He is known for creating non-traditional films in the horror and science fiction genres, produced by his company called MonsterPants. McKenney filmed for Dark Sky Films the supernatural thriller Hypothermia, the film stars Michael Rooker, Greg Finley and is shot in Mayfield, New York at Great Sacandaga Lake.

== Filmography ==
As Director

- 2002 – CanniBallistic!
- 2004 – The Off Season
- 2006 – Automatons
- 2009 – Satan Hates You
- 2012 – Hypothermia
- 2013 – The Girl from Mars
- 2013 – Villain
