= Carter Oosterhouse =

American television personality and former model

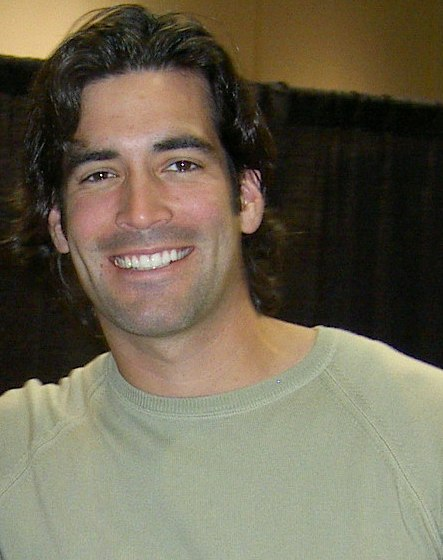
- Oosterhouse at a 2005 home and garden show
- Born: Carter Nicholas Oosterhouse; September 19, 1976 (age 49); Traverse City, Michigan, U.S.
- Occupations: Television personality; model
- Years active: 2003–present
- Spouse: Amy Smart (m. 2011)
- Children: 1
- Website: carteroosterhouse.com

Carter Nicholas Oosterhouse (born September 19, 1976) is an American television personality and former model, who was born in Traverse City, Michigan. He first gained national fame as a carpenter on the TLC series Trading Spaces and has hosted other home improvement and how-to television shows. In 2008, he was host of three HGTV network shows: Carter Can, Red Hot & Green, and Million Dollar Rooms.

== Education ==
Oosterhouse's career as a carpenter began at the age of 10, when he began learning carpentry as an apprentice to a carpenter who was his neighbor. He continued to work in carpentry and construction throughout school following in the footsteps of his older brothers, Todd and Tyler, who are also carpenters. For his formal education, he attended Grand Traverse Area Catholic Schools in Traverse City. Oosterhouse has a B.A. in nutrition and communication from Central Michigan University in Mount Pleasant northwest of Saginaw, Michigan.

== Early career ==
After college, Oosterhouse moved to Los Angeles to pursue a career in film and television. He worked there behind-the-scenes for the Project Greenlight as a production assistant and tape coordinator. When auditioning for a new show on TLC, Oosterhouse landed a part on the show Trading Spaces, and joined the cast in their fourth season.

== Television shows and appearances ==
In 2003, Oosterhouse joined TLC's series Trading Spaces in its fourth season. In that same year, TLC also added the spin-offs Trading Spaces: Family and Trading Spaces: Boys v. Girls to their programs, which allowed Oosterhouse the opportunity to work with children. In 2004, Oosterhouse was on an episode of CBS Sunday Morning in New York in which he remodeled correspondent Bill Geist's office with the help of commentator Andy Rooney. In 2005, Oosterhouse was a contributor to NBC's show Three Wishes, a primetime unscripted series with Amy Grant, in which Oosterhouse visited small towns across America to help wishes come true.

Oosterhouse has been featured as an expert for programs including Rachael Ray, The Today Show, The CBS Early Show, The Oprah Winfrey Show, The View, CNN, Entertainment Tonight, and Extra. In fall 2007, Oosterhouse launched two new shows, Carter Can, a home improvement show premiering on HGTV, and The Inside Job, a behind-the-scenes view of Carter Can, on the DIY Network. In early 2008, a second show was added on the HGTV network, Red Hot & Green, with Nicole Facciuto on which Oosterhouse promotes eco-friendly materials for earth-friendly living.

Oosterhouse was the host of the 2012 HGTV show Million Dollar Rooms, showcasing extravagant features of elaborately built homes. In 2015, Oosterhouse began hosting the ABC reality show The Great Christmas Light Fight with Taniya Nayak. He returned for subsequent holiday seasons in 2016 through 2023.

== Print ==
Oosterhouse has been named one of People magazine's "Sexiest man on TV" in its "Sexiest Man Alive" issue. He was named one of the sexiest men on television by TV Guide Channel, Inside TV magazine, and CosmoGirl. He has been featured in US Weekly, OK Weekly, USA Today, the Los Angeles Times, Chicago Tribune, Redbook, Good Housekeeping, Everyday with Rachael Ray, LA Confidential, and other publications.

== Modeling ==
Oosterhouse is the face of the men's fragrance Voyage by Nautica.

In the past, Oosterhouse has modeled in print campaigns for Nivea, Lincoln, Hewlett Packard, and Miller Light. In addition, he has also appeared in television advertisements for Bud Light, Lake Michigan Credit Union, Nivea, Treasure Island in Las Vegas, Gillette's M3Power razor, and Rooms To Go.

== Winery ==
In 2010, brothers, Carter and Todd Oosterhouse, founded Bonobo Winery in Traverse City.

== Charitable works ==
Oosterhouse established Carter's Kids, a non-profit organization dedicated to creating and promoting awareness of fitness and self-esteem for America's youth. Its purpose is to increase the activity level of children by building and developing community parks and playgrounds in their neighborhoods. They have the opportunity to take an active part in building up their community by using, sharing, and caring for these public spaces. In 2011, Carter's Kids partnered with Rebuilding Together to build six playgrounds promoting the health and welfare of children in low income communities.

== Personal life ==
Oosterhouse married actress Amy Smart on September 10, 2011, in his hometown of Traverse City, Michigan. They had their first child, Flora Oosterhouse, via surrogate on December 26, 2016.

In December 2017, a makeup artist on the Carter Can television show accused Oosterhouse of coercing her into performing sex acts in 2008. He acknowledged an "intimate relationship" and claimed it had been consensual, with the woman in question initiating such encounters on the first and several successive occasions. The woman's claims have not been "confirmed or verified".

== See also ==
- Eliminalia - removed critical stories for Oosterhouse
