= Eric Manes =

American film producer

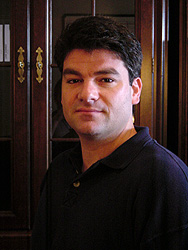
- Born: Eric David Manes; Queens, New York, U.S.
- Occupations: Screenwriter, producer
- Height: 6 ft (183 cm)

Eric David Manes is a feature film and television writer and producer, owner of Swiss chocolate company Coco Suisse with his wife Marianne Manes, and a State of California Registered Investment Advisor.

== Biography ==
Manes produced the documentary Voices of Iraq, for which he funneled digital video cameras to hundreds of Iraqis in the midst of war. The Iraqis interviewed thousands of their compatriots. Within six months, the film was finished, marketed, and distributed for theatrical release in the United States. Because of its unparalleled intimacy and access to Iraqis, the footage was featured on This Week with George Stephanopoulos. Manes guided Voices of Iraq through its worldwide release and festival circuit, bringing it to Edinburgh, Melbourne, Locarno, and South Korea.

Manes produced the $60 million budgeted 3000 Miles to Graceland (starring Kevin Costner, Kurt Russell, Christian Slater and Courteney Cox) for Warner Bros. Manes also wrote and produced the feature film Campfire Tales (starring Amy Smart, James Marsden, Ron Livingston, and Christine Taylor) for New Line Cinema and the indie comedy Phat Beach (with "Entourage” creator Doug Ellin and starring Coolio).

His film and television screenplays include Warner Bros.’ Dodging Bullets for Will Smith and Halle Berry, Paramount’s The Brazilian, and 20th Century Fox’s Hindenburg for Jan de Bont. He created and executive produced “HRT” (starring Michael Rooker and Ernie Hudson) for CBS and Columbia TriStar and “Catch” for CBS. With Doug Liman, Manes reinvented “CHiPs” for NBC and Warner Bros. He also created the reality show “Mayor” for Columbia TriStar. In 2002, NBC/Studios USA signed Manes to an exclusive writing/producing contract. He wrote and executive produced "Witch Doctor", a TV pilot for Beacon TV and ABC television studios in 2008.

For CBS, he created and executive produced television pilots with Academy Award winning producer Mark Johnson. In 2000, Manes convinced MTV to gamble on a reality show where contestants film themselves while completing challenges in the world's most haunted locations. The result was MTV's Fear, MTV's second highest rated show in 2000 and 2001, which Manes created and executive produced.

Prior to this, Manes founded a post-production facility that American Cinematographer magazine noted for its innovative use of inexpensive, cutting edge, post-production technology to finish indie films.

In 2011, DirecTV, Technicolor, and Panasonic got together to finance an experimental 3D film for Manes to produce and shoot on Panasonic's new 3D camera systems. DirecTV will distribute the 3D film internationally.

Born in New York City, Manes studied business and philosophy at New York University and is a member of the Writers Guild of America.

== Selected filmography ==
Year	Project	Credit	Studio/Network
2026	Ben	writer, producer	
2023	Women of Iran	producer	Moriah Media
2023	Children of Selvino	producer	Moriah Media
2023	Sinatra	producer	Moriah Media
2021	The Magic Knight	writer	Disney Pictures
2020	Emperor of a Thousand years	writer	Disney Pictures, Shanghai Media Group
2012	Sheriff Gus Skinner: Standing Tall	executive producer	A&E
2011	Misney Makes Them Pay	creator, executive producer	Booya Studios
2011	Ripper	writer, producer	Booya Studios, DirecTV, Panasonic
2008	Witch Doctor	writer, executive producer	ABC Studios
2008	Miracle Chasers	writer, executive producer	Columbia Tristar
2005	Dodging Bullets	writer	Warner Bros.
2004	Voices of Iraq	producer	Magnolia Pictures
2002	The Mayor	creator, executive producer	Columbia Tristar
2003	CHiPs	writer, executive producer	Warner Bros.
2002	Catch	writer, executive producer	CBS
2002	Beautiful People	writer, executive producer	USA Networks
2001	HRT	writer, executive producer	CBS, Columbia TriStar
2001	Inside Fear	creator, executive producer	MTV
2001	Faces of Fear	creator, executive producer	MTV
2000	MTV's Fear	creator, executive producer	MTV
2000	3000 Miles to Graceland	writer, producer	Warner Bros.
1998	They Come at Night	producer	indie
1997	Campfire Tales	writer, producer	New Line Cinema
1997	Lowball	producer	Cinequinon
1996	Phat Beach	producer	Orion Pictures
1995	Where Do Planes Sleep?	producer	Indie

== See also ==
- History of Film
- Documentary Film
- Reality Television
- Voices of Iraq
- MTV's Fear
- Campfire Tales
- 3000 Miles to Graceland
