= Martin Kunert =

American film director

- Born: Marcin von Kunert-Dziewanowski; 1974 (age 51–52); Warsaw, Poland
- Occupations: Writer, director, producer, photographer

Martin Kunert (born Marcin Stanisław von Kunert-Dziewanowski (herb Jastrzębiec)); 1974) is a feature film and television writer, director and producer; and since 2010, a fashion photographer. When the Shanghai Media Group and Disney Pictures agreed on a 15 year co-production of producing Chinese films driven by Hollywood creatives, Martin Kunert was hired to create and write the original franchises. That was part of Kunert’s long career of creating innovative content. In 2004, Kunert conceived and directed the documentary Voices of Iraq, made by sending 150 DV cameras to Iraqis to film their own lives. MovieMaker Magazine hailed the film as "truly a groundbreaking film…both in terms of its content and the process behind its production."

Previously, Kunert created and executive produced MTV's Fear, the first reality show to have contestants film themselves. Kunert created the show's frightening ambiance, developed the oft-mimicked visual and musical style and streamlined the show's editing process, where on a weekly basis, over 250 hours of contestant generated video was edited into 45-minute episodes. MTV's Fear spawned TV specials, fan clubs, DVDs, and numerous copycat television shows, including NBC's Fear Factor and VH1's Celebrity Paranormal Project.

Kunert has also directed television and feature films, including the cult favorite Campfire Tales (starring Amy Smart, Jimmy Marsden, Ron Livingston, and Christine Taylor) for New Line Cinema and Rogue Force (starring Michael Rooker and Robert Patrick) for Miramax. His screenplays include Warner Bros.' Dodging Bullets for Will Smith and Halle Berry, Paramount's The Brazilian, and 20th Century Fox's Hindenburg for Jan de Bont. He created and executive produced "HRT" (starring Michael Rooker and Ernie Hudson) for CBS and Columbia TriStar and "Catch" for CBS. With Doug Liman, Kunert reinvented "CHiPs" for NBC and Warner Bros. He also created the reality show "Mayor" for Columbia TriStar. In 2002, NBC/StudiosUSA signed Kunert to an exclusive writing/directing/producing contract. He wrote and executive produced "Witch Doctor", a TV pilot for Beacon TV and ABC television studios in 2008.

In 2011, DirecTV, Technicolor, and Panasonic got together to finance an experimental 3D film for Kunert to direct and shoot on Panasonic's new 3D camera systems. As part of it, Technicolor trained Kunert extensively on how to make clean, non-headache inducing, 3D motion images. DirecTV will distribute the 3D film internationally.

As a fashion photographer, he shot with multiple high-luxury brands and for prestigious fashion magazines like Harpers Bazaar.

Kunert is a graduate of New York University's film school. He is a member of the Directors Guild of America and Writers Guild of America.

He was born in Warsaw, Poland and grew up in Westfield, New Jersey before attending the New York Military Academy. He comes from a noble family originating in the Polish region of Mazovia, a family known for their close relationship with and support of Frédéric Chopin.

== Filmography ==
Year	Project	Credit	Studio/Network
2026	Ben	writer, director	Moriah Media
2023	Women of Iran	director	Moriah Media
2023	Children of Selvino	director	Moriah Media
2023	Sinatra	director	Moriah Media
2021	The Magic Knight	writer	Disney Pictures
2020	Emperor of a Thousand years	writer	Disney Pictures, Shanghai Media Group
2013	Legend of Sheriff Gus Skinner	creator, executive producer	A&E
2011	Ripper	writer, director	Booya Studios, DirectTV, Panasonic
2011	Misny Makes Them Pay	creator, executive producer	Booya Studios
2009	WaterSigns	director	Imagination9 Productions
2009	Ambrose: All I Ever Wanted	director, DP	Booya Studios
2008	Witch Doctor	writer, executive producer	ABC Studios
2008	Miracle Chasers	writer, executive producer	Columbia Tristar
2008	Fugue State	writer, director	Booya Studios
2005	Dodging Bullets	writer	Warner Bros.
2004	Voices of Iraq	producer, director	Booya Studios, Magnolia Pictures
2002	The Mayor	creator, executive producer	Columbia Tristar
2003	CHiPs	writer, executive producer	Warner Bros.
2002	The Brazilian	writer	Paramount
2002	Catch	writer, executive producer	CBS
2002	Beautiful People	writer, executive producer	USA Networks
2001	HRT	writer, executive producer	CBS, Columbia TriStar
2001	Inside Fear	creator, executive producer	MTV
2001	Faces of Fear	creator, executive producer	MTV
2000	MTV's Fear	creator, executive producer	MTV
1998	Hindenburg	writer	20th Century Fox
1998	Renegade Force	director	Miramax
1997	Campfire Tales	writer, director	New Line Cinema

== See also ==
- History of Film
- Documentary Film
- Reality Television
- Voices of Iraq
- MTV's Fear
- Campfire Tales
- 3000 Miles to Graceland
