= Satan Hates You =

- Directed by: James Felix McKenney
- Written by: James Felix McKenney
- Produced by: Larry Fessenden
- Starring: Don Wood; Christine Spencer; Larry Fessenden; Bradford Scobie; Angus Scrimm; Reggie Bannister; Alan Rowe Kelly; John Levene
- Cinematography: Eric Branco
- Edited by: James Felix McKenney
- Release date: 2010
- Running time: 94 minutes
- Country: United States
- Language: English

Satan Hates You is a 2010 American horror film written and directed by James Felix McKenney.

== Plot ==
A homage to end of times Christian horror movies of the 1970s, the story follows the crisis of faith of an unemployed alcoholic and a pregnant, cocaine snorting, pill popping teenager. Two demons try to claim their souls, while heavenly missionaries try to set the damned heroes on the path of redemption.
