= Automatons (film) =

2006 American horror film

- Directed by: James Felix McKenney
- Written by: James Felix McKenney
- Produced by: James Felix McKenney; Lisa Wisely
- Starring: Christine Spencer; Angus Scrimm; Brenda Cooney
- Cinematography: David W. Hale
- Edited by: James Felix McKenney
- Music by: Noah DeFilippis; The Noisettes
- Release date: December 13, 2006
- Running time: 83 minutes
- Country: United States
- Language: English

Automatons is a 2006 black-and-white horror film directed by James Felix McKenney, and starring Christine Spencer, Angus Scrimm, and Brenda Cooney. John Levene, Don Wood and Executive Producer Larry Fessenden have supporting roles. The plot is about a war against robots. The movie was made under the working title Death to the Automatons.

== Plot ==
Somewhere in the distant future, The Girl is living alone in a bunker. She continues to fight with the generations-long war with the assistance of a group of antiquated robot helpers and soldiers.

Her only connection to her people is a collection of recorded journal entries made by the scientist who cared for her as a baby. His is the only friendly human face she’s ever seen. These entries gradually disclose the fall of mankind: escalating war that destroyed Earth's atmosphere, human reproductive abilities, and all hope for future. The Girl is revealed to be a clone, created as a last attempt to restore humanity's dwindling numbers.

The regular radio transmissions from her enemy's leader are always filled with threats and taunts. The girl responds with attacks of her own, carried out by her mechanical soldiers on the contaminated surface where no human can survive.

After a transmission is used to intercept control of the robots, the girl decides to launch a full-scale assault on the enemy base, and does so, succeeding by hiding inside one of the machines (using it as an exoskeleton). Upon defeating the enemy remnants, she is told by dying enemy leader that they are the last people on the planet, rumors of prosperous nations being just myths.

The girl is put before a choice to either spare the enemy leader, or kill her. Believing that she lies, the girl executes the last of her foes. This activates the large EMP generator, however, which the enemy never used before (as using it would doom themselves too). All machines and bunker life support cease to function, leaving the girl alone, trapped within the enemy base, with no way out. The film ends with her calmly staring in the illuminator.

== Cast ==
- Christine Spencer
- Brenda Cooney
- Angus Scrimm
- Don Wood
- John Levene

== Critical opinion ==
George Ward wrote:"This all-too-convincing horror takes to its utmost conclusions the potentialities of nightmare launched in Karl Capek's R.U.R. eighty years ago".
