= Fear (American TV series) =

American paranormal reality television series

- Also known as: MTV's Fear
- Created by: Martin Kunert; Eric Manes
- Opening theme: "Voodoo" by Godsmack
- Country of origin: United States
- Original language: English
- No. of seasons: 2
- No. of episodes: 16

Production
- Executive producers: Martin Kunert; Eric Manes; Beau Flynn
- Running time: 43 minutes

Original release
- Network: MTV
- Release: September 21, 2000 – April 28, 2002

Related
- MTV's Inside Fear (2001); Celebrity Paranormal Project (2006)

Fear (promoted as MTV's Fear) is an American paranormal reality television series that originally aired from 2000 to 2002 on MTV and spawned the genre. The program follows a group of five or more contestants who are left at an allegedly haunted location and led on a series of dares over two nights to explore the location and determine whether it is haunted. The show was created by Martin Kunert and Eric Manes, who were inspired by the 1973 horror film The Legend of Hell House. The pilot episode was co-executive produced and directed by George Verschoor. The series aired the first two episodes in a pilot run, which received outstanding reviews, and a full season was ordered. After eight more episodes, another season was ordered. The second season ended after only six aired episodes. The series was cancelled not because of a lack of interest (the show was the second most popular on MTV at the time of its cancellation) but because of the high cost of producing each episode. A DVD, MTV's Inside Fear, was released on November 6, 2001.

Fear was named #6 on Entertainment Weekly's "15 Taboo-Breaking TV Moments".

== Rules ==
Contestants are blindfolded and led by guides to the supposedly haunted area. They were then instructed to remove their blindfolds after a predetermined amount of time, allowing the guides to slip out unseen. The area where they are taken is known as the 'safe house', usually a large room somewhere within the location where no hauntings are reported to have taken place. This location serves as the group's base and is the only part of the haunted location with lighting. Every member of the group chooses a color at random from a predefined list. During daylight hours, the group is allowed to sleep and eat, as dares only take place at night. Once night arrives, a computer terminal will usually pick one or two colors and assign a dare. This computer also provides the group with background information about the area. A member of the group, not assigned to the current dare, provides instructions from the computer via two-way radios.

Each contestant is given the option, at any time during the dare, to abort. However, doing so will cause the contestant to forfeit his or her share of the winnings and to leave the group. Another contestant will then be chosen by the computer to complete the dare. After two nights, any contestants remaining in the game are directed to the location of their monetary prize, and each collects $5,000. (In the pilot episode, the survivors only received $3,000 each.)

The dares themselves range in difficulty, often starting out easy and close to the safe house, eventually getting more difficult and further from the group's base. While most rely on simple observation (radio silence, EMF detector), some of the dares rely on specific re-enactments of haunting events, and a few even dabble in occult or paranormal possession (séance, automatic drawing, spirit channeling).

== Locations ==
The locations shown in the show usually had their name changed to protect their location from vandals and show fanatics. However, some of the places allowed their name to be used, and some of the fans of the show used the Internet to piece together potential matches for the locations used in the show. The locations used in the show were:

Season 1 (2000–2001)

- Episode 1 – West Virginia Penitentiary
- Episode 2 – St. Agnes Hospital for the Chronically Ill* (Real Location: Fairfield State Hospital, Connecticut)
- Episode 3 – Duggan Brothers Cement Factory* (Real Location: Ideal Cement Company, 6411 Ideal Cement Rd., Castle Hayne, North Carolina)
- Episode 4 – Hopkins Military Academy* (Real Location: Augusta Military Academy, Virginia)
- Episode 5 – Camp Spirit Lake* (Real Location: Camp NoBeBoSco, Hardwick Township, New Jersey) This episode is infamous for containing a completely fictionalized account of the Princess Doe murder.
- Episode 6 – Buck Hill Inn
- Episode 7 – Eastern State Penitentiary
- Episode 8 – USS Hornet
- Episode 9 – Fort Gaines
- Episode 10 – La Guerre Plantation* (Real Location: Desert Plantation, Louisiana)

Season 2 (2001–2002)

- Episode 1 – Mina Dos Estrellas: Pt.1**
- Episode 2 – Mina Dos Estrellas: Pt.2**
- Episode 3 – Hacienda Tabi
- Episode 4 – Ki Sugar Mill* (Real location Haʻikū Sugar Mill in Haʻi kū, Maui, Hawaii)
- Episode 5 – Serenity Lake Sanitorium* (Real location King Edward VII Sanatorium in Kamloops, British Columbia, Canada)
- Episode 6 – Boettger Brewery* (Real Location: Lemp Brewery, St. Louis, Missouri)

(* denotes locations where names are not the actual names of the location)

(** denotes the only location where all original contestants quit. This is why Minas Dos Estrellas is featured in two episodes of Fear instead of the usual one. A second group of contestants came in and finished the challenge in the second episode.)

== Music ==
The hard rock band Godsmack's song "Voodoo" was used as the theme song. For the second season "First Day of Nowhere" by Sinisstar was used in the end credits.
