= Rally Caps =

- Directed by: Lee Cipolla
- Written by: Lee Cipolla
- Produced by: Katherine Borda; Amy Williams; Gary Sales; William Garcia
- Starring: Amy Smart; Judd Hirsch; Carson Minniear
- Production companies: Crystal Rock Entertainment; We Make Movies; Playworld Pictures
- Release date: April 7, 2024 (ReelAbilities Film Festival)
- Running time: 100 minutes
- Country: United States
- Language: English

Rally Caps is a 2024 American adventure drama film written and directed by Lee Cipolla, and starring Amy Smart, Judd Hirsch and Carson Minniear. It is based on the novel by Stephen J. Cutler and Jodi Michelle Cutler.

== Cast ==
- Carson Minniear as Jordy
- Colten Pride as Lucas
- Ben Morang as Rob
- Judd Hirsch as Herb
- Amy Smart as Nora
- James Lowe as Jerry
- Noelle Pride as Niki

== Release ==
The film was released on September 10, 2024.

== Reception ==
Bobby LePire of Film Threat rated the film a 7.5 out of 10.

Richard Propes of The Independent Critic gave the film a positive review and wrote that it "has a warm and sincere retro vibe..."
