= Campfire Tales (1997 film) =

1997 horror film

- Promotional artwork
- Directed by: Martin Kunert: David Semel; Matt Cooper
- Written by: Martin Kunert: Eric Manes; Matt Cooper
- Produced by: Eric Manes: Larry Weinberg; Lori Miller
- Starring: James Marsden; Amy Smart; Ron Livingston; Christine Taylor; Glenn Quinn; Jacinda Barrett
- Cinematography: John Peters
- Edited by: Luis Colina: Rick Fields; Steven Nevius; Martin Kunert (uncredited)
- Music by: Andrew Rose
- Production company: The Vault
- Distributed by: New Line Home Video
- Release dates: May 16, 1997 (UK); September 22, 1998 (U.S.)
- Running time: 87 minutes
- Country: United States
- Language: English
- Budget: $2 million

Campfire Tales is a 1997 American straight-to-video horror film directed by Matt Cooper, Martin Kunert, and David Semel. The film consists of three individual short segments, framed within an overarching narrative told by a group of friends around a campfire after their car breaks down in the woods.

The film stars James Marsden, Christine Taylor, Amy Smart, and Ron Livingston. Although the project was conceived in 1995 as a theatrical release, the studio lost confidence in its potential success, and it was ultimately released straight-to-video by New Line Home Video, a Warner Bros. label. It first came out in May 1997 in the United Kingdom and later in September 1998 in the United States.

The film is currently out of print in any physical format and is only available on online platforms.

== Plot ==
In the 1950s, Jenny and Eddie are kissing in a car at a viewpoint. Jenny becomes nervous that someone is watching them after they hear a radio broadcast of a madman on the loose in the area. She forces Eddie to drive them back to town, thinking she sees someone lurking in the woods. They arrive at a drive-in, and Eddie walks to the window to order a milkshake. When he returns toward the car, he sees a hook hanging from the car's passenger door.

In the present day, Cliff, his girlfriend Lauren, and her little brother Eric and friend Alex are driving home from a concert. Cliff, drunk and driving erratically, crashes the car in the woods. They light flares and discover an abandoned church foundation nearby, where they start a fire. To pass the time, they begin telling a series of campfire tales.

In the first story, Rick and Valerie are on their honeymoon driving through Nevada. They take a detour to visit caverns and park their RV in a rural area. They are disturbed by a local man who warns them not to spend the night there, insisting they park elsewhere. They ignore him and park a little further up, still in the rural area. The local is attacked by unseen creatures and brutally killed. As they have sex in the RV, a creature watches through the window. Valerie sprains her ankle, and Rick leaves to walk to a gas station nearby, even though he had recently filled their tank up. On his way to the service station, Rick stumbles upon the body of the local man, and he too is attacked. Rick gets choked, damaging his vocal cords, making it difficult for him to speak. He runs back to the RV, but Valerie doesn’t recognize his knock. Valerie is attacked through the sunroof of the RV and terrorized by the creature. She pepper sprays the creature and sounds a panic alarm before passing out. She awakens to a police officer knocking on the door of the RV. As she exits the RV, she hears a screeching noise; the officer tells her to look straight ahead, but she looks back and sees Rick's eviscerated corpse hanging upside down from a tree, his wedding ring scratching across the metal rooftop.

In the second story, eleven-year-old Amanda is in an online chat room talking to a girl named Jessica, who is actually an online predator posing as a young girl. The night before her twelfth birthday, her parents go to a parent-teacher conference and rely on her teenage sister Katherine to stay with her. Katherine leaves to go meet her boyfriend, leaving Amanda alone. Later on, while searching the garage to find her dog, the lights go out, and she becomes anxious and feels as though there is someone else in her house. After finding out that her sister Katherine has just returned home, Amanda heads back to her room. Seeing what looks like her dog under the bed, she lies down and puts her hand down to allow it to be licked by the dog. While looking in the mirror Amanda sees the phrase "People can lick too" and the man licking her hand. She runs to Katherine's room telling her to call 911. Katherine enters Amanda's room, finds the corpse of the family dog underneath Amanda's bed and the window open.

In the third story, Scott is riding his motorcycle through the country, and it gives out on him. He notices a rural farmhouse and seeks shelter there during a rainstorm. Inside is a beautiful mute woman named Heather; she communicates with Scott by writing on a handheld chalkboard and invites him to stay the night. During the night, they are disturbed when her father, a rancher, arrives. Scott hears a commotion downstairs and runs to the kitchen, where he sees two bloodied bodies and witnesses Heather's father throwing a woman's severed head into the well outside. He finds Heather unharmed, and she insists they leave the house. On the chalkboard, she writes that there are ghosts there. Suddenly, they are confronted by her father, who attacks Scott with an axe. They flee from the house, and as they leave, he passes by Heather's father, who walks toward the front door and enters the house, as if in a time loop. Scott and Heather ride away on his motorcycle and spend the night under a willow tree. In the morning, he removes the locket from her neck and opens it; inside is a photo of them both, dressed in old-fashioned clothing. As Heather awakens, a wound appears across her neck, and her head falls into his lap.

After each of the friends have told a story, Cliff decides to return to the road and sees that the police have stopped at the site of their car accident. Suddenly, Lauren, Eric, and Alex vanish, and their campfire disappears from the church. When Cliff returns to the road, he sees himself near the wreckage of his car and an RV, surrounded by paramedics who are attempting to revive him. Lauren, Eric, and Alex are lying dead on stretchers. The RV drivers are Rick and Valerie from the first story; Scott from the third story and Amanda's and Katherine's mother from the second story are paramedics attempting to revive Cliff. The attempts to resuscitate him fail, and Cliff dies. Later on, as the paramedics clean up, a car approaches the scene of the accident, with a hook emerging from the open window.

== Cast ==
The Hook
- Amy Smart as Jenny
- James Marsden as Eddie

The Campfire

- Jay R. Ferguson as Cliff
- Christine Taylor as Lauren
- Christopher Masterson as Eric
- Kim Murphy as Alex

The Honeymoon

- Ron Livingston as Rick
- Jennifer Macdonald as Valerie
- Hawthorne James as Cole

People Can Lick Too

- Alex McKenna as Amanda
- Devon Odessa as Katherine
- Jonathan Fuller as 'Jessica' / Internet Man

The Locket

- Glenn Quinn as Scott Anderson
- Jacinda Barrett as Heather Wallace
- Denny Arnold as Heather's father

== Production ==
Writer and co-director Martin Kunert and producer Eric Manes had known one another while both film students at New York University, and collaborated to make Campfire Tales as their debut feature. According to writer and acquaintance Skip Press, Kunert and Manes "did whatever it took" to get the film made. The working titles for the film included Fear and All American Campfire Horror Stories.

It featured the film debut of Australian actress Jacinda Barrett, playing a mute woman in the third segment. She had previously appeared on The Real World: London in 1995.

== Music ==
The end credits feature a cover of the 1962 song "Monster Mash", by female-fronted punk rock band Bobsled. This cover was made for the film, and does not appear on any of their releases. The "People Can Lick Too" segment also features The Rentals' song "Waiting" (from their 1995 album Return of the Rentals) and the Imperial Drag song "Man on the Moon" (from their 1996 self-titled album).

When the film was released, there was no accompanying soundtrack album.

== Release ==
The film was released direct-to-video in overseas countries by Initial Entertainment Group, first on May 16, 1997 in the United Kingdom, and then on June 13, 1997 in Germany. In Australia, it was released during September 1997 by Eagle Entertainment and Time Life Video. Late that year, it was also released on VHS in New Zealand. Campfire Tales was intended to be released theatrically in America in 1997, with the film attracting interest from Warner Bros. and Paramount, who nearly gave it a wide release to 2,000 theaters following the success of Scream. The theatrical distribution deals never eventuated, with Warner's New Line Home Entertainment later acquiring the North American rights to Campfire Tales, releasing it on VHS in the United States and Canada on September 22, 1998. Promotional material from 1998 compared Campfire Tales to the Scream series and I Know What You Did Last Summer, despite the fact the film itself had been conceived prior to both of these. In 1998, it was also released on LaserDisc by New Line and Image Entertainment. In Hong Kong, it was released on LaserDisc by Mei Ah Entertainment.

Campfire Tales subsequently received a release on DVD by New Line on August 30, 2005. Beginning on May 12, 2015, the film was briefly made available for digital streaming by the Warner Bros. Digital Distribution branch, in addition to being re-released on DVD in North America as part of the Warner Archive Collection. It was re-released on DVD in Germany on August 8, 2020, after being out of print for several years in Europe. The reissue used the original 1997 German VHS artwork, and was limited to 1,000 copies. In 2024, the film was made available digitally on several platforms, including Apple TV, Amazon Prime, Tubi and Plex. These services used a new higher resolution print of the film, which also cuts out New Line Cinema's logo at the beginning of the film. It was never made available on the Warner-owned streaming service HBO Max, despite the company's earlier distribution history with the film.

== Reception ==
AllMovie awarded the film a two out of five star-rating. Steve O’Brien of SFX magazine gave the film a negative review in June 1997, writing, "It’s difficult to imagine why anyone would want to watch a sanitised slasher movie such as this, especially when so few of these loathsome kids actually die." Australian paper The Age labelled it a "procession of competent but conventional creepiness" in their September 1997 review. Donald Munro and Rick Bentley of The Fresno Bee awarded the film a B-rating in September 1998, writing: "None of the short stories are masterpieces, but they offer plenty of moments to make you jump." In his 2011 book Horror Films of the 1990s, John Kenneth Muir writes that "This is the second 1990s horror anthology entitled Campfire Tales, and like the other, unrelated film from 1991, it involves horrific vignettes recounted from a campfire. Also, like the other Campfire Tales, this one deserves to be a little less obscure than it is. Filmed at the height of the slasher revival, it features smart, late-1990s teens countenancing several tales of horror, one of which involves them too." He concludes by stating that "Campfire Tales is a modest but enjoyable effort. The stories don't try to do too much, and don't rely on special effects."

Dread Central reviewer Steve Barton wrote: "Each of these stories is well written and slickly directed. The troop behind the film — Matt Cooper, Eric Manes, and Martin Kunert — are horror fans that know how to get the job done. Other films that have tried to capitalize on the whole handed-down story thing such as Urban Legend do not even come close to handling the subject matter as smartly as it is done in Campfire Tales. Honestly, there are twists, turns, and twist endings with enough energy for two films to be found here, none of which feels tacked on or forced." Film and cultural critic Michael Wilson noted the film as an homage to Dead of Night (1945). Similarly, film scholar Mikel Koven called it "noteworthy" for its unusual narrative structure. Richard Scheib of the Science Fiction, Horror and Fantasy Film Review gave the movie three and a half stars and wrote: "The film received little genre press and it was released direct to video (although the end credits reveal that it was originally intended for theatrical release). All of which usually spells low-budget independent horror film. The surprise about all of this is what a good little film Campfire Tales actually is. Occasionally, it has an over-earnest enthusiasm about it but the episodes are all written with originality and intelligence."

Website Rivers of Grue wrote of the film: "Campfire Tales. It’s just a little sterile when all is said and done." Kevin Matthews from For It Is Man's Number gave the film six out of ten and stated: "It's not a bad little movie but there are better urban legends to choose from and better ways to showcase the material."

=== Legacy ===
The 2003 Bollywood horror film Darna Mana Hai was loosely based on the 1997 version of Campfire Tales.

In 2019, Den of Geek included it on their list of "12 Underrated Scream-Inspired Horror Movies of the Late 90s", commenting that the film had a "smart script".

In 2021, Dread Central's Josh Korngut included it on his list of "10 Scream-Inspired Slashers We Fully Forgot About". He labelled it a "semi-forgotten 1997 horror anthology put out by New Line Cinema about ten minutes after the release of Scream", adding that "It’s not a slasher per se, but everything about this urban legend horror moment reeks of post-Scream panic. That said, it’s great [...] It stars a bunch of people who have since become famous, including Christine Taylor, Ron Livingston, Amy Smart and James Marsden. While some of the entries in this anthology are better than others, it’s still an unmissable late-90s classic."

== See also ==
- The Hitch-Hiker (The Twilight Zone). 1960 01 22

== Sources ==
- De Vos, Gail (2012). What Happens Next? Contemporary Urban Legends and Popular Culture. Libraries Unlimited. ISBN 978-1-598-84633-1.
- Koven, Mikel (2008). Film, Folklore, and Urban Legends. Lanham, Maryland: Scarecrow Press. ISBN 978-0-810-86025-4.
- Muir, John Kenneth (2011). Horror Films of the 1990s. Jefferson, North Carolina: McFarland. ISBN 978-0-786-48480-5.
- Press, Skip (2004). The Ultimate Writer's Guide to Hollywood. Barnes and Noble Publishing. ISBN 978-0-760-76110-6.
- Wilson, Michael (2005). Storytelling and Theatre: Contemporary Professional Storytellers and Their Art. Macmillan International Higher Education. ISBN 978-0-230-20309-9.
