= Hypothermia (film) =

- Official movie poster
- Directed by: James Felix McKenney
- Written by: James Felix McKenney
- Produced by: Derek Curl; Larry Fessenden; Brent Kunkle; Peter Phok
- Starring: Michael Rooker; Blanche Baker; Greg Finley; Benjamin Forster; Amy Chang; Don Wood
- Cinematography: Eric Branco
- Edited by: Neal Jonas
- Production companies: Dark Sky Films; Glass Eye Pix
- Distributed by: Dark Sky Films
- Release date: October 2, 2012
- Running time: 72 minutes
- Country: United States
- Language: English

Hypothermia is a 2012 American independent horror film written and directed by James Felix McKenney. It stars Michael Rooker, Blanche Baker, Greg Finley, Don Wood and Amy Chang. The film centers on a family out ice fishing only to discover that something deadly is stalking them from the icy waters.

== Plot ==
On an icy lake, Ray Pelletier is looking for an ice fishing spot when he falls through the ice. Inside the lakeside cabin, his wife Helen, son David, and David's girlfriend Gina talk. Helen asks David and Gina about their plans after college, which involve joining the Peace Corps and going to Uganda.

The three go outside looking for Ray, who has passed out from exhaustion after escaping the lake. They return to the cabin, where Gina examines him. Ray wakes up and assures everyone he is fine. The creature, which earlier watched Ray struggle in the water, observes the family.

The next day, the family drills through the ice as the creature watches from underneath. Another family consisting of Steve Cotes and his son Jr. set up for ice fishing, with a truck and a trailer. Soon after, the Cotes spot the underwater creature and unsuccessfully chase after it on snowmobiles.

The two groups briefly socialise. Later, while walking back to their fishing hole, the Pelletier family see the creature heading straight for the men. Jr. attempts to reel it in, but it pulls him down. The others rescue Jr., who has a huge gash on his arm and Steve takes him inside the trailer. Steve believes the creature can sense vibrations and is eating everything in the lake.

Steve invites the Pelletier family to dinner. During dinner, Steven Jr. begins to feel disoriented, and his wound squirts blood onto Gina. They treat the wound, which looks infected. Steven Jr. insists the creature has legs and is not a fish. The family urges Steve to take him to the hospital, but he refuses, implying Jr. does not need a doctor.

Later, Ray, Steve and David run a motor on the ice to disorient the creature. When Jr. comes out from the trailer and collapses, the creature drags him into the water. Steve jumps in after him, but sees that his son is dead. Ray jumps in and retrieves Steve.

When Steve wakes up, they decide to leave as soon as he is ready. They also tell Steve that he was cut by the creature. When Steve tries to get up, his cut oozes as if infected. Steve yells about wanting to hunt down the creature that killed his son. The family calms him down and they agree to leave in the morning.

As they rest, Ray hears Steve starting the snowmobiles to attract the creature. As Steve argues with Ray, he begins to experience the same disorientation that his son felt earlier. The creature attacks after David comes out to see what is going on, and takes Steve with it. When it returns, David and Ray get into the trailer, but David has a cut on his face. Helen panics and sucks out the venom. They stay in the trailer to hide from the creature. As David lies on the floor, the creature's hand pushes through the lid in the floor and claws at David, cutting his throat and killing him.

In the morning, Gina reveals she and David had planned to get married before going into the Peace Corps, and that they were going to announce it last night at dinner, but never got a chance with all that happened. Ray grabs one of Steve's guns and the family goes outside. Gina views Steve's remains with horror. Ray attempts to attract the creature by starting the snowmobiles, but they will not start. They hear a sound, and look back to see that Steve's body is gone as the creature eats his body underwater. As they continue walking, they see the shadow of the creature swimming under the ice beneath them. Ray urges Helen and Gina to get to the shore while he fights the creature off. The creature rams the ice under Ray so that it cracks and breaks under his weight. Ray is killed. The creature stalks Helen and Gina. When it catches them, it stares them down as Helen talks to it. It leaves them and the women calmly walk toward the cabin.

== Cast ==
- Michael Rooker as Ray Pelletier
- Blanche Baker as Helen Pelletier
- Benjamin Hugh Abel Forster as David Pelletier
- Amy Chang as Gina
- Don Wood as Steve Cote
- Greg Finley as Steven Cote Jr.
- Larry Fessenden as Fishing Host
- Asa Liebmann as Lake Man

== Production ==
Hypothermia was shot in Mayfield, New York at Great Sacandaga Lake, finishing in March 2010.

== Release ==
The film was released on DVD by Dark Sky Films on October 2, 2012.

== Reception ==
Hypothermia received mostly negative reviews upon its release. Dread Central awarded the film a score of 2.5 out of 5, criticizing the film's minimal plot, character development, editing, and monster costume, which they called "laughably cheap". The review did, however write, "That said, there’s still enjoyment to be derived from both the competently made and laughably bad sides of Hypothermia. An ungainly mix, to be certain, but one I can semi-recommend to fans of old fashioned monster movies." Rob Getz from HorrorNews.net stated that the film started out strong, with good cinematography, building of tension, and establishment of its sparse characters. However, Getz further stated that the film was ruined by the "cheesy" monster costume, and anticlimactic finale, calling it "a shameful waste of potential". Felix Vasquez of Cinema Crazed similarly criticized the film's monster design, and finale, while also criticizing the film's off kilter tone and writing. Vasquez concluded his review by writing, "I wish I could recommend this and boast about it being a hidden gem, but in the end it’s merely forgettable and only worth trying for the sake of Rooker." Ian Jane from DVD Talk gave the film 2.5 out of 5 stars, writing, "Hypothermia features a decent performance from a top billed Michael Rooker and has the potential to be a fun little monster movie but never quite lives up to its potential." Jason Coffman from Film Monthly called it "a lean, suspenseful horror show", while noting the low-budget monster design, he commended the film's acting, natural chemistry between characters, and convincing gore effects.
