= Voices of Iraq =

2004 film by Martin Kunert

- Theatrical release poster
- Directed by: "People of Iraq", (Martin Kunert uncredited)
- Produced by: Eric Manes; Martin Kunert; Archie Drury
- Distributed by: Magnolia Pictures
- Release date: October 29, 2004
- Running time: 80 minutes
- Countries: United States; Iraq
- Languages: Arabic; English; Kurdish

Voices of Iraq is a 2004 documentary film about Iraq, created by distributing cameras to the subjects of a film, thus enabling subjects to film themselves. To preserve its innovative filmmaking, Voices of Iraq was added to the permanent collection of Motion Picture Academy of Arts and Sciences.

Producer Eric Manes explained, "Without Iraqis as the directors, we would have seen Iraq and its people only through the filter of Western eyes. We certainly would not have had the access or the emotional intimacy that was captured in the film."

Euphrates, an Iraqi Anglo hip-hop group, scored the soundtrack. The film was released theatrically in the United States and internationally and created a new genre of filmmaking termed Documentary swarm.

== Production ==
Movie Maker Magazine asked the producers, "Voices of Iraq is truly a groundbreaking film—both in terms of its content and the process behind its production. What was your main mission in creating this film?" Eric Manes responded, "Our goal was simply to give the Iraqi people a voice. For years we had heard only the American media’s version of what Iraq and its people were like. We decided that since Iraq was such a major issue in the U.S., it was time to hear their story first-hand. Iraqis are a wonderfully diverse group of people who have been silenced for over 24 years, living in fear of Saddam Hussein and his regime. We realized we could finally give Iraqis a venue to freely share their lives, hopes and dreams with the rest of the world now that he was no longer in complete control of the country." When questioned on the film's budget, Martin Kunert said, "We used single chip, GR-D30U JVC cameras, which you can buy used on the net for around $230." "Our budget came out to around $500,000. With inexpensive cameras and editing stations, the greatest expense was our post-production staff: translators and assistant editors. Second to that, the 35 mm blow-up."

== Reception ==
- The San Francisco Chronicle wrote, "'Voices of Iraq' is a must-see for anyone still coming to terms with the chaos in Iraq."
- The Los Angeles Times, "By turns heartbreaking, amusing and disturbing, the film features people from different regions, economic classes and religions, recounting stories that are sometimes bleak, sometimes encouraging, but always compelling"
- Variety, "In a season of political documentaries that take one side or the other on the war in Iraq, a film has emerged whose purpose is not to address American politics but the Iraqi people."
- The Hollywood Reporter, "Perhaps the sharpest commentary on years of suffering, hope and the wages of war are the children in front of and behind the cameras."
- The Wall Street Journal, "At a time when shrill political diatribes dominate the documentary scene, along comes an authentic work that dares to let the subject speak for itself – literally."
- Dallas Morning News, "An extraordinary, up-to-the-minute tapestry that ranges all over this country of 25 million people and carries the force of revelation."
- The Washington Times: "'Voices of Iraq' is neither partisan nor conservative in any meaningful sense of the word. However, as an attempt to get behind the filter of the mainstream media – as a picture of reality unmediated by editorial commentary – it’s a more potent negation of Michael Moore, Craig Unger, Noam Chomsky and Co."
- The New York Times: "If this film cannot claim to represent the political "truth" about the war – what film could?"
- Variety: "As a true or accurate portrait of the real Iraq, however, pic pales in comparison to various in-depth U.S. and European reports, and to Bahman Ghobadi's brilliant new drama on wartime Kurdish refugees, "Turtles Can Fly.""
- The Village Voice: "any film that credits itself as "filmed and directed by the people of Iraq" deserves to be regarded with skepticism."
- Detroit Free Press: "a revealing documentary that depicts the day-to-day hopes and grief of people. Mothers talk about sons gone missing. Interviews are interrupted by bomb explosions. Kids practice in a rock band after listening to black-market Metallica CDs. The movie is disturbing, sometimes funny, and also timely.... Maybe my skepticism comes with the timing- the movie arrives just days before the presidential election."

== Distribution ==
In the fall of 2004, Magnolia Pictures distributed Voices of Iraq theatrically in the United States. It is now available on DVD.

In 2005, Voices of Iraq screened as part of the Directors Guild of America "Filmmaking and War" series and screened in international films festivals at Locarno, Edinburgh, Melbourne, South Korea and the Philippines. After which, it entered in theatrically distribution internationally.

Reportedly, the film spread across Iraq as a popular community distributed film.

== Film credits ==
Made by Booya Studios. Filmed and directed by the People of Iraq (and Martin Kunert, uncredited). Produced by Eric Manes, Martin Kunert, Archie Drury. Edited by Robin Russell, Martin Kunert, Stephan Mark. Distributed theatrically in the US by Magnolia Pictures, and overseas by Becker Film International.

The Voices of Iraq soundtrack was produced and performed by Euphrates, an Iraqi Anglo hip hop group.
