= John Levene =

English actor, producer, entertainer and singer (born 1941)

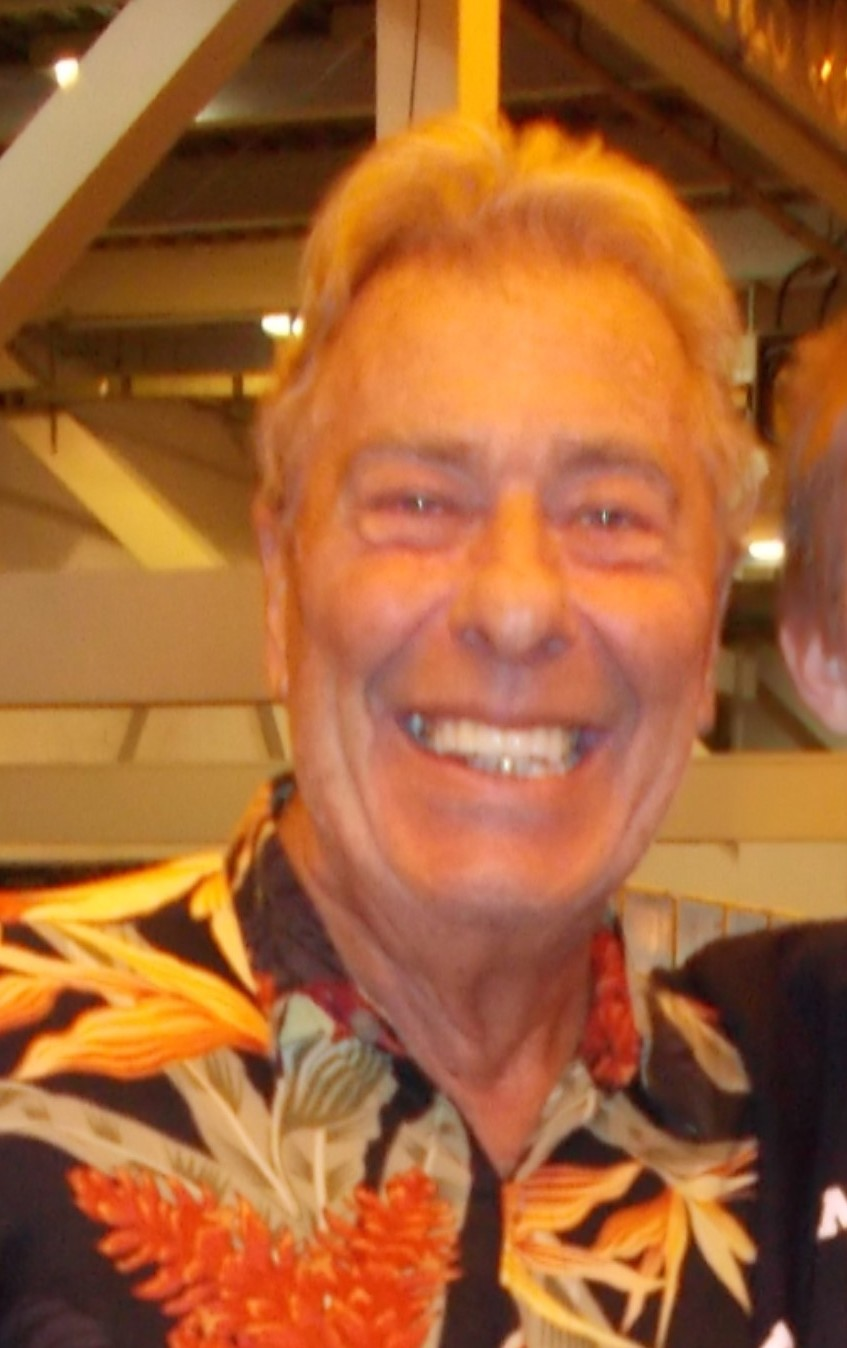
- John Levene at a Doctor Who convention in 2014
- Born: John Anthony Woods; 24 December 1941 (age 84); Salisbury, Wiltshire, England
- Other name: John Anthony Blake
- Occupations: Actor; producer; entertainer; singer
- Years active: 1965–present
- Organization: Genesis Communications
- Known for: Doctor Who
- Spouses: Diana Wade (m. 1966; div. 1983); Jennifer Wegner (m. 1992; div. 2011)
- Children: 2
- Website: john-levene.com (Archived)

John Anthony Woods (born 24 December 1941), known professionally as John Levene, is an English actor, producer, entertainer and singer. Although he has appeared in a large number of films and television series, Levene's best-known role is that of Sergeant Benton, of UNIT in the science-fiction television series Doctor Who, a role he played from 1968 to 1975.

== Early life ==
Levene was born John Anthony Woods in Salisbury, Wiltshire, on Christmas Eve 1941, the eldest child of Austin and Vera Woods (née Blake); he has a younger brother called Michael. Levene was born breeched, jaundiced and was dead for the first couple of minutes of his life after he suffocated from a piece of afterbirth being stuck in his airways and his heart stopped beating for two minutes until the doctor removed the blockage. Levene's father was a sergeant in the army and was on board the SS Empire Baffin; upon his return he was awarded a Distinguished Service Medal by King George VI. Levene suffered from multiple health issues as a child, being temporarily blinded in one eye from falling onto a pen knife and bed-ridden for two years after contracting a severe blood infection; he had to have a blood transfusion although the blood he was given was contaminated which made his condition worse giving him severe hallucinations. Levene attended St. Thomas's school in Salisbury although missing two years of school due to his illness and being dyslexic resulted in him failing his eleven-plus exams.

After leaving school, Levene's first job was being a car mechanic at a garage during the day and then being a nurse at the local hospital in the evenings. Other jobs that Levene had later on included being a tallyman, a window cleaner and a cement mixer at a building site at Boscombe Down. Wanting to leave Wiltshire due to having no work prospects and a bad relationship with his father, Levene moved to Jersey and became a menswear salesman in the biggest shop on the island, Noel and Porter. After Levene's girlfriend became pregnant with their daughter Samantha, the two married and relocated to London where they had a son, Jason. The family lived next door to Anthony Hopkins before he became famous. Levene would often help the actor learn his lines.

Levene began working in Hope Brothers, a men's clothing store on Regent Street in London when Telly Savalas came to the store and encouraged him to sign up as an actor for The Dirty Dozen (1967). Although he failed to secure a part in the film, since he was not a union member, he became interested in acting. Upon joining Equity, he adopted the professional name John Levene to avoid confusion with another John Woods who was already registered with the union.

== Career ==
Levene's first acting role was in the television series Adam Adamant Lives! in 1967 and shortly after secured a regular role as the desk sergeant in Z Cars. Levene formed a good working relationship with the director Douglas Camfield who made roles for Levene in his other television series. Other TV roles included episodes of The Newcomers (1966), UFO (1970), Callan (1972), The Adventurer (1972) and Carry On Laughing (1975). Levene also featured in the opening titles of the television series Paul Temple as the man running down the corridor; there is a moment when the man turns around that he can be easily identified as Levene.

Levene's first film part was due to be in The Man Who Haunted Himself (1970) with Roger Moore, a film about two versions appearing of the same man, played by Moore. Levene was to play the double when Moore's character is in shot with Levene's back to the camera. After winning the part and getting on well with Moore, the producers told Levene shortly after that he would no longer star in the film as Moore was concerned that Levene was as smart as he was. Despite this, Levene went on to appear in the films When Dinosaurs Ruled the Earth (1970), Zeppelin (1971), Go for a Take (1972), Psychomania (1973), The Blockhouse (1973), Dark Places (1974) and Permission to Kill (1975).

=== Doctor Who ===
Levene made his first appearances in Doctor Who as an uncredited Cyberman due to his tall stature in the 1967 serial The Moonbase and as a Yeti in The Web of Fear. Levene also made his first appearance as then-Corporal Benton of UNIT in The Invasion and was hired instead at the insistence of Douglas Camfield. UNIT were featured heavily in early-1970s Doctor Who, and the promoted Sergeant Benton also became a regular, appearing in a total of 67 episodes. Levene struck up a rapport with his co-stars Jon Pertwee (The Doctor), Nicholas Courtney (The Brigadier), Katy Manning (Jo Grant), Richard Franklin (Captain Mike Yates) and Roger Delgado (the Master). Fans of Doctor Who often refer to these characters as the UNIT family, and as this era as a 'golden age' of the show. Levene's last regular appearance was in the Fourth Doctor serial The Android Invasion in 1975.

=== After Doctor Who ===
In 1977, following his final appearance on Doctor Who, Levene gave up acting as a career to set up his own audio-visual company, Genesis Communications. He has since directed more than 45 audio-visuals and live events for various clients including the Ford Motor Company, British Airways, KFC, Amway and Revlon.

In 1983, Levene turned down the opportunity to reprise the role of Benton for the 20th-anniversary Doctor Who special "The Five Doctors". Five years later he did return to the role for the 1988 Reeltime Pictures video production Wartime.

Levene has worked as an entertainer on cruise liners and has also lived in the United States, where he returned to acting under the name John Anthony Blake. ("Blake" was the maiden name of Levene's mother, and as he informed the writers Steve Lyons and Christopher Howarth, he had had a much better relationship with her than with his father.) He has also performed voice-over work for Disney and The Queen Mary Hotel, among other companies.

Levene's most recent acting work was in an independent film titled Satan Hates You. He has also appeared in an episode of Big Bad Beetleborgs and industrial videos. In 2008, Levene co-starred with Sylvester McCoy and Sophie Aldred in Twice Upon a Timelord, a video production in which the Seventh Doctor and Ace attend Benton's wedding.

Levene's music album The Ballads of Sergeant Benton was released in September 2012. The same year, he returned to the UK to promote himself and his album at a number of Doctor Who events. In 2015 he recorded vocals for an audio adaptation of the Doctor Who charity novel Time's Champion.

In September 2017, he joined other Doctor Who stars, including showrunner Steven Moffat, in recording audio contributions for the YouTube anniversary video of multimedia artist Stuart Humphryes. Levene has also reprised the character of Sergeant Benton for the Big Finish Doctor Who audio series in Council of War (2013), UNIT: Assembled (2017), The Scream of Ghosts (2019) and Poison of the Daleks (2020).

In 2019, Levene published his autobiography, entitled Run the Shadows, Walk the Sun. In 2021, Levene took part in a special documentary in which he and Doctor Who co-star Katy Manning revisit the village of Aldbourne where they filmed an episode of Doctor Who fifty years previously.

== Filmography ==
=== Film ===
Year	Title	Role	Notes
1970	When Dinosaurs Ruled the Earth	Minor Role	
1971	Zeppelin	British Soldier	
1972	Go for a Take	Assistant Director	
1973	Psychomania	Constable	
1973	The Blockhouse	Soldier	
1974	Dark Places	Doctor	
1975	Permission to Kill	Adams	
1988	Wartime	John Benton	Direct to video film
2002	CanniBallistic!	Bernie Shanks	
2005	Planetfall	Videophone Alien	
2006	Automatons	Communications Captain	
2010	Satan Hates You	Reverend Bernie Shanks	

=== Television ===
Year	Title	Role	Notes
1965	Undermind	Man in Club	Episode: "Waves of Sound"
1966	The Newcomers	Man	Episode: #1.125
1967	Doctor Who	Cyberman	Serial: The Moonbase
1967	Adam Adamant Lives!	S.S. Guard	Episode: "A Sinister Sort of Service"
1967	Z Cars	Constable	13 episodes
1967	Les Misérables	Prisoner	Episode: "Release"
1967	The First Freedom	Soviet Guard	TV film
1968	Doctor Who	Yeti	Serial: The Web of Fear
1968	Detective	Detective	Episode: "Crime of Passion"
1968, 1970–1975	Doctor Who	Corporal/Sergeant John Benton	66 episodes
1969	Softly, Softly	Youth	Episode: "A Quantity of Gelignite"
1969	The Expert	Prison Officer	Episode: "A Question of Guilt"
1969	ITV Playhouse	Taraxan	Episode: "The Friendly Persuaders"
1969	A Handful of Thieves	Police Constable	Episode: "The Fireworks Party"
1969	Special Branch	Special Branch Man	Episode: "A New Face"
1969	Coronation Street	Drinker in Rover's Return	Episode: #1.939
1970	Germinal	Miner	Episode: "Mob Rule"
1970	ITV Sunday Night Theatre	Ernie	Episode: "Lay Down Your Arms"
1970	Paul Temple	Paul Temple	Opening titles; 13 episodes
1970	The Troubleshooters	Man	Episode: "The Order of the Good Time"
1970	The Doctors	Det. Insp. Coates	Episode: #1.82
1970	UFO	Interceptor Pilot	Episode: "Close Up"
1971	The Rivals of Sherlock Holmes	Constable	Episode: "The Affair of the Tortoise"
1972	The Regiment	Corporal Challoner	Episode: "The Fortunes of Peace"
1972	Callan	Harold	Episode: "I Never Wanted the Job"
1972	The Pathfinders	RAF Sergeant	Episode: "Our Daffodils Are Better Than Your Daffodils"
1973	The Adventurer	Tony	Episode: "I'll Get There Sometime"
1973	Whoops Baghdad	Cassan	Episode: "Genie of the Bottle"
1973	The Jensen Code	Military Policeman	2 episodes
1975	Carry On Laughing	Soldier	Episode: "The Baron Outlook"
1975	The Growing Pains of P.C. Penrose	Motorist	Episode: "The Peeper"
1997	Big Bad Beetleborgs	Lord T. N. Crumpets	Episode: "The Curse of Mums' Tomb"
