= Renegade Force =

- Film Poster
- Directed by: Martin Kunert
- Written by: Rick Bloggs; Alan Schechter
- Produced by: Alan Schechter
- Starring: Michael Rooker; Robert Patrick; Diane DiLascio; Louis Mandylor
- Cinematography: Adam Kane
- Edited by: Kert VanderMeulen
- Music by: Patrick Griffin
- Production company: Triple Peak Productions
- Distributed by: HBO; Miramax; New City Releasing; PM Entertainment Group; Starlight
- Release date: December 4, 1998; (USA)
- Running time: 89 minutes
- Country: United States
- Language: English
- Budget: 7,000,000 (Estimated)

Renegade Force (aka Counterforce and Rogue Force) is a 1998 action film, starring Michael Rooker, Robert Patrick, Diane DiLascio and Louis Mandylor. The movie was written by Rick Bloggs and Alan Schechter and directed by Martin Kunert.

== Plot ==
Rooker plays an FBI agent who joins force with a cop (Diane DiLascio) to investigate some mysterious deaths of several mobsters.

== Cast ==
- Michael Rooker as Matt Cooper
- Robert Patrick as Jake McInroy
- Diane DiLascio as Helen Simms
- Louis Mandylor as Peter Roth

== Reception ==
Comeuppance Reviews called Renegade Force a "brainless action at its best", stating: "In the end: Rogue Force is 90 minutes of cool FBI\SWAT action. The plot is routine but who cares when you're having a good time?". Movie Mavs gave the film 3,5 stars out of 4, praised several aspects of the movie and concluding: "Rogue Force is a better than average corrupt police themed adult thriller, with some solid acting."
