= United Federal Credit Union =

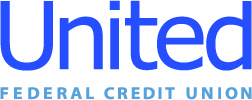
- Company type: Credit union
- Industry: Financial services
- Founded: 1949
- Headquarters: St. Joseph, Michigan, United States
- Area served: Michigan, Ohio, Nevada, North Carolina, Arkansas, Indiana, Pennsylvania
- Key people: Terry O'Rourke (President/CEO)
- Services: Savings; Checking; Consumer Loans; Mortgages; Credit cards; Investments; Insurance; Business Services
- Total assets: $4.0B (2024)
- Number of employees: 749 full-time; 10 part-time
- Website: unitedfcu.com

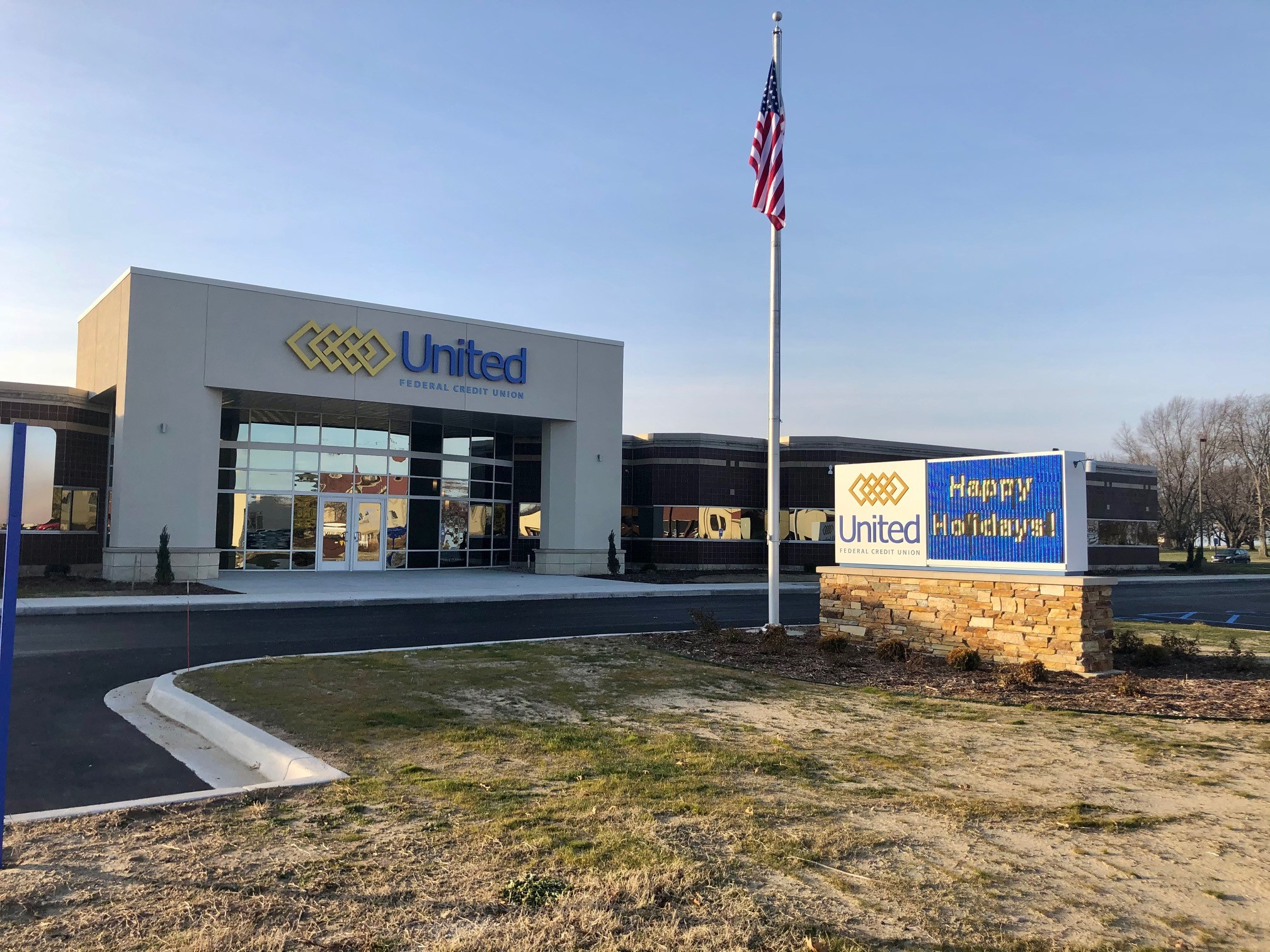
Headquarters in St. Joseph, Michigan

United Federal Credit Union (UFCU) is an American federally chartered credit union based in St. Joseph, Michigan. Originally chartered in 1949, UFCU has more than 190,000 Members in all 50 states and the District of Columbia. The credit union assets in excess of $4.0 billion as of October 2025. United has 39 branches in seven states: Michigan, Ohio, Indiana, Nevada, North Carolina, Pennsylvania, and Arkansas. United Federal Credit Union offers a diverse array of products and services for businesses and individuals, include checking and savings accounts; auto loans, RV and boat loans, credit cards; mortgage, construction, and lot loans; home equity loans, and lines of credit; business accounts, loans, and credit cards.

== History ==
United Federal Credit Union's origins date to the 1930s and 1940s, when the Nineteen Hundred Employee Credit Union (NHECU), and the Buchanan Clark Employee Credit Union (BCECU), were originally formed to serve the employees of the companies that would ultimately become the Whirlpool Corporation and the Clark Equipment Company. NHECU formed in 1949 with eight employees and volunteers who handled the transactions. Nineteen Hundred Corporation became Whirlpool Corporation in 1950, and the credit union became Whirlpool Employee Federal Credit Union (WEFCU).

By 1955, WEFCU's assets reached $1 million. By 1958, assets doubled to $2 million. Assets more than doubled again over the next five years, and in 1963, WEFCU moved into a brand new building in St. Joseph, MI. In 1969, BCECU became Clark Credit Union, and a short time later, Clark Federal Credit Union. Growth continued for WEFCU between 1963 and 1978, requiring the credit union to relocate to 2900 South State Street in downtown St. Joseph. Assets exceeded $30 million, with 15,800 members and 27 employees.

Beginning in 1980, WEFCU merged with credit unions serving Whirlpool subsidiaries in Marion, OH and Fort Smith, AR. In 1987, CFCU reached $50 million in assets and changed their name to United Federal Credit Union (UFCU) while WEFCU because Whirlpool Community Federal Credit Union (WCFCU). Then in 1992, WCFCU changed again to the First Resource Federal Credit Union (FRFCU). During the 1990s, both FRFCU and UFCU broke ground on new corporate headquarters buildings, located in St. Joseph, MI, and Buchanan, MI, respectively.

New branches opened in Holland, MI in 2000, and in 2006, FRFCU merged with UFCU. All locations adopted the UFCU name, but the headquarters remained in St. Joseph and retained the FRFCU charter number.

In 2009, growth continued with the acquisition of Clearstar Financial Credit Union in Reno, NV. In 2011, UFCU purchased Griffith Savings Bank in Griffith, IN, marking the first time a bank had been purchased by a federally chartered credit union. As of 2012, assets reached $1.5 billion with plans in progress for an expanded corporate headquarters.

In October 2015 Lake Michigan Credit Union and United Federal Credit Union announced their intent to merge. The merger did not occur.

United moved corporate headquarters in December 2020 with the completion of a renovation project at 150 Hilltop Road in St. Joseph, Michigan which was a former Whirlpool Corporation corporate building.

Two mergers occurred in 2021 when United acquired a branch in Springdale, Arkansas from Truity Credit Union in February, and completed its acquisition of Edgewater Bank in St. Joseph, Michigan in April.

In 2024 United opened a new branch in Minden, NV, and completed its merger of GOLD Credit Union in Allentown, PA on April 1, 2024. United continued its expansion in Northern Nevada with the opening of its Fernley branch in April 2025.

== Timeline ==
1930s	• 1937 – Buchanan Clark Employee Credit Union (BCECU) formed	
1940s	• 1949 – Nineteen Hundred Employee Credit Union (NHECU) formed	
1950s	• 1950 – NHECU changes name to Whirlpool Employee Federal Credit Union (WEFCU) • 1955 – WEFCU reaches $1 million in assets • 1958 – WEFCU reaches $2 million in assets	
1960s	• 1962 – Construction of the first free-standing building for WEFCU • 1963 – WEFCU reaches $4.5 million in assets • 1969 – BCECU changes name to Clark Credit Union	
1970s	• 1972 – Clark Credit Union becomes Clark Federal Credit Union (CFCU) • 1978 – WEFCU reaches $30.2 million in assets	
1980s	• 1980 – Marion Whirlpool Employee Credit Union in Marion, OH merges with WEFCU • 1981 – Whirlpool Employee Credit Union in Fort Smith, AR merges with WEFCU • 1987 – WEFCU changes name to Whirlpool Community Federal Credit Union (WCFCU) • 1987 – CFCU reaches $50 million in assets, changes name to United Federal Credit Union (UFCU)	WEFCU changes name to Whirlpool Community Federal Credit Union
1990s	• 1991 – WCFCU changes name to First Resource Federal Credit Union (FRFCU) • 1992 – FRFCU reaches $140 million in assets; UFCU reaches $75 million in assets • 1993 – FRFCU opens new headquarters on South State Street in St. Joseph, MI • 1995 – UFCU reaches $100 million in assets and 21,000 members • 1996 – UFCU builds a new corporate office in Buchanan, MI • 1999 – Lakeland Credit Union merges with FRFCU	UFCU reaches $100 million in assets and 21,000 members
2000s	• 2001 – Lake View Credit Union merges with UFCU • 2002 – Gast Employee Credit Union merges with UFCU • 2003 – Marion Federal Credit Union merges with FRFCU • 2006 – UFCU merges into FRFCU and together they adopt the United Federal Credit Union name • 2009 – UFCU acquires Clearstar Financial Credit Union in Reno, NV	UFCU merges into FRFCU and together they adopt the United Federal Credit Union name
2010s	• 2010 – UFCU membership reaches 100,000 • 2011 – UFCU purchases assets of Griffith Savings Bank in Griffith, IN, becoming the first credit union to purchase a bank • 2012 – UFCU reaches $1.5 billion in assets and 117,000 members • 2012 – UFCU announces corporate headquarters expansion project • 2013 – UFCU named Michigan Credit Union League Outstanding Credit Union of the Year 2013 and National Federal Credit Union of the Year 2013 by the National Association of Federal Credit Unions. • 2015 – Opens branch in Springdale, AR. • 2016 – Assets of $2 billion and 150,000 members; opens branches in Carson City, NV, and Asheville, NC. • 2018 - Opens branches in South Bend/Mishawaka, IN. • 2019 - Opens branches in Springdale and Rogers, AR; opens branches in Granger and Mishawaka, IN	
2020s	• 2020- Assets of $3 billion and 177,000 members; new Corporate Headquarters (Team United HQ) opens at 150 Hilltop Road in St. Joseph, MI; opens second branch in Hendersonville, NC. • 2021- United acquires Springdale, AR branch from Truity Credit Union; acquires Edgewater Bank in Southwest Michigan • 2024- United opens Minden, NV branch; completes merger of GOLD Credit Union in Allentown, PA • 2025- United opens Fernley, NV branch	

== Products and services ==
United Federal Credit Union provides products and services to individuals and businesses. For Individual Members, there are checking accounts, long or short-term savings options including IRAs or HSAs; mortgage, auto, and equity loans; lines of credit for debt consolidation; and investment planning options. UFCU also offers a Member Assistance Program to help Members work through debt concerns.

UFCU also offers Business Members access to loans, checking accounts, and cash management options, as well as payroll management and merchant services.
