= Lake Michigan Credit Union =

Credit union in Michigan, United States

- Company type: Credit union
- Founded: 1933
- Headquarters: Grand Rapids, Michigan, United States
- Number of locations: 53 (2019)
- Key people: Sandra Jelinski (CEO)
- AUM: US$4.35 billion (2018)
- Website: www.lmcu.org

Lake Michigan Credit Union (LMCU), founded in 1933, is a credit union based in Grand Rapids, Michigan. As of 2019, Lake Michigan Credit Union has 53 locations throughout the states of Michigan and Florida. Lake Michigan is currently the largest credit union in the state of Michigan and the largest financial institution based in Western Michigan. As the organization is a federally insured state-chartered credit union, Lake Michigan Credit Union is regulated by the National Credit Union Administration (NCUA). Lake Michigan Credit Union was officially chartered in 1933 and was assigned NCUA charter number 62514.

== History ==
Lake Michigan Credit Union was founded in 1933 in Grand Rapids, Michigan, by Lloyd F. Hutt as Grand Rapids Teachers Credit Union. On March 1, 2002, the institution changed its name to Lake Michigan Credit Union.

In mid-May 2010, the Kalamazoo-based Citizens Credit Union announced that it planned to merge with Lake Michigan Credit Union. This merger took place in June 2010 and resulted in the addition of Citizen Credit Union's 9,000 members and $60 million assets to Lake Michigan Credit Union's estimated 168,000 members and $1.87 billion assets.

In October 2015, Lake Michigan Credit Union and United Federal Credit Union announced their intent to merge. However in January 2016, the two institutions canceled the plan stating they could best serve their members independently.
