= Amy Smart =

American actress (born 1976)

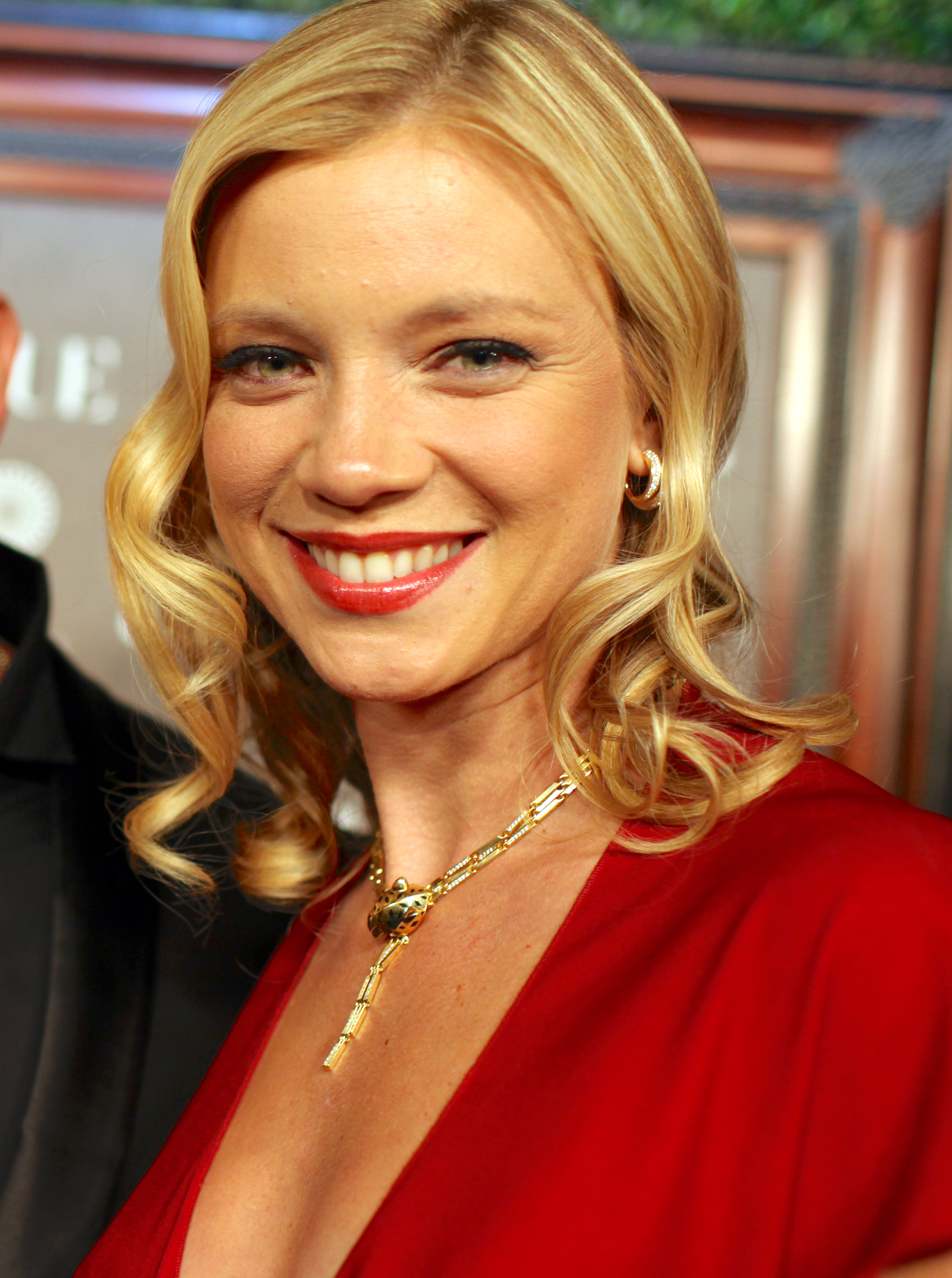
- Smart in 2009
- Born: Amy Lysle Smart; March 26, 1976 (age 50); Los Angeles, California, U.S.
- Occupations: Actress; model
- Years active: 1996–present
- Spouse: Carter Oosterhouse (m. 2011)
- Children: 1

Amy Lysle Smart (born March 26, 1976) is an American actress and former model. Her first role in film was in Martin Kunert's anthology horror film Campfire Tales, followed by a minor part in Starship Troopers, directed by Paul Verhoeven. In 1998, Smart played a role in Dee Snider's Strangeland. She garnered widespread recognition after appearing in the mainstream teen drama Varsity Blues (1999), as well as for a recurring role as Ruby on the television series Felicity (1999–2001). Next was a lead role in the college sex comedy Road Trip (2000); she was a co-star in Jerry Zucker's ensemble comedy Rat Race (2001). She had a lead role opposite Ashton Kutcher in the sci-fi drama The Butterfly Effect (2004).

Smart co-starred with Ryan Reynolds and Anna Faris in Just Friends (2005), followed by the sports drama Peaceful Warrior (2006). From 2011 to 2012, she had a recurring role as Jasmine Hollander in the American adaptation of Shameless. She starred in Tyler Perry's comedy The Single Moms Club (2014). From 2020 to 2022, Smart portrayed Barbara Whitmore in the DC Universe/The CW superhero drama series Stargirl.

== Life and career ==
=== 1976–1992: Early life ===
Smart was born March 26, 1976, in Los Angeles; she grew up in Topanga Canyon. Her mother, Judy Lysle (née Carrington), worked at a museum, and her father, John Boden Smart, was a salesman. Smart studied ballet for ten years and graduated from Palisades Charter High School in Pacific Palisades, Los Angeles.

=== 1993–2003: Modeling and film beginnings ===
While modeling in Milan, Italy, Smart met fellow model Ali Larter and the two "became instant friends", according to Larter. In Los Angeles they took acting classes together. In 1993, she appeared in the video for The Lemonheads' "It's About Time". Smart's first film role was in director Martin Kunert's 1997 Campfire Tales. In 1996, she appeared in a small role as Queenie in the adaptation of John Updike's short story, directed by Bruce Schwartz, "A&P", later shown on Spike TV. She had a minor role in Paul Verhoeven's science fiction thriller Starship Troopers (1997) as a copilot, and a starring role in the miniseries The 70s, playing a student at Kent State University. In 1999, Smart played the girlfriend of a popular American football player in the film Varsity Blues, reuniting her with Larter. Also in 1999, she appeared in the film Outside Providence.

From 1999 to 2001, Smart played Ruby, a recurring character on the series Felicity. She costarred in the films Road Trip (2000), Rat Race (2001), Starsky & Hutch (2004), and the science fiction drama The Butterfly Effect (2004). In 2003, Smart had a small role in the American sitcom Scrubs, playing Jamie "T.C.W." Moyer.

=== 2005–2013: Studio films and television ===
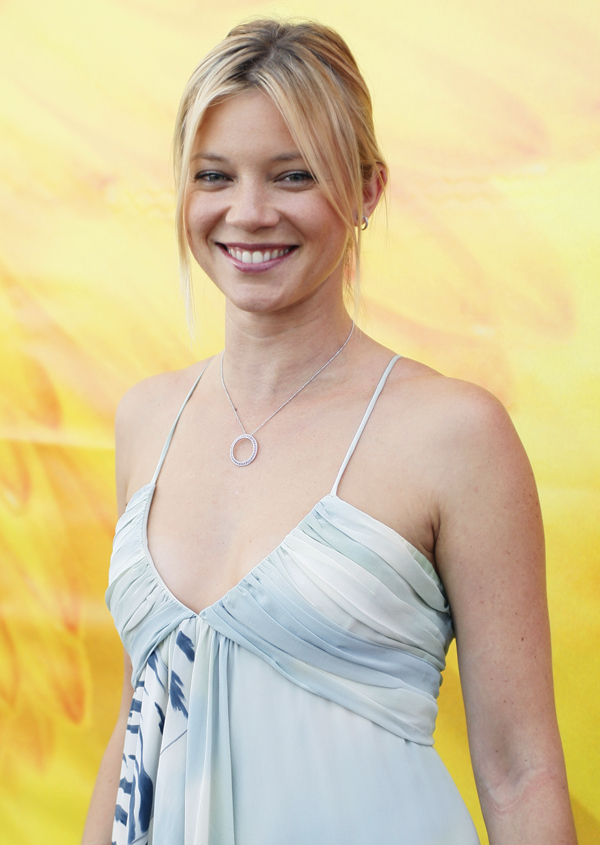
Smart at LA Fashion Week in 2008

In 2005, Smart co-starred with Ryan Reynolds in the romantic comedy film Just Friends, playing the high school friend of a previously overweight young man who, years later, returns to her hometown and attempts to confess his love for her. The film was a box office hit, grossing over $50 million worldwide. Also in 2005, she starred as Sarah in the British independent film The Best Man with Seth Green. She had a lead role in the independent drama Bigger Than the Sky (2005), a loose adaptation of Cyrano de Bergerac.

Smart appeared in the 2006 action thriller film Crank. She reprised the role in the sequel, Crank: High Voltage, released in 2009. She was a regular cast member in the short-lived 2006 CBS television series Smith, playing a professional burglar. She has voiced characters in the animated series Robot Chicken. Smart appeared as Joy in the 2006 sports drama Peaceful Warrior, about a gymnast whose life changes after an encounter with a spiritual guide. She starred as Melissa in the 2008 independent horror film Seventh Moon, and had a supporting role in Alexandre Aja's supernatural thriller Mirrors (2008).

In March 2011, Smart joined the Showtime comedy-drama Shameless as recurring character Jasmine Hollander. She continued to guest star in season two.

On September 10, 2011, Smart married TV carpenter Carter Oosterhouse from the American cable channel HGTV, in Traverse City, Michigan.

=== 2014–present: Television and independent films ===
In 2014, Smart appeared in the Tyler Perry comedy The Single Moms Club followed by the thriller Hangman (2015). In 2016, she appeared in a supporting role in the television film Sister Cities (2016). She also appeared in two episodes of the IFC series Maron (2016), portraying Nina.

In 2019, Smart was cast to play Barbara Whitmore in the DC Universe/The CW superhero drama television series Stargirl, a role she has played from 2020 to 2022.

== Personal life ==
Smart married television personality Carter Oosterhouse on September 10, 2011, in Traverse City, Michigan. In 2016, their daughter was born via a surrogate; Smart talked about the experience in 2017, explaining that she struggled for years trying to conceive. She wrote on her Instagram, "After years of fertility struggles I give thanks today to our kind, loving surrogate for carrying her."

== Filmography ==
=== Film ===
Year	Title	Role	Notes
1996	A&P	Queenie	
1997	Campfire Tales	Jenny	Segment: "The Hook"
1997	The Last Time I Committed Suicide	Jeananne	
1997	Starship Troopers	Pilot Cadet Stack Lumbreiser	
1997	High Voltage	Molly	
1998	How to Make the Cruelest Month	Dot Bryant	
1998	Circles	Allison	
1998	Starstruck	Tracey Beck	
1998	Strangeland	Angela Stravelli	
1999	Varsity Blues	Jules Harbor	
1999	Outside Providence	Jane Weston	
2000	Road Trip	Beth Wagner	
2001	Scotland, PA	Stacy	
2001	Rat Race	Tracy Faucet	
2002	Interstate 60	Lynn Linden	
2003	National Lampoon's Barely Legal	Naomi	
2003	The Battle of Shaker Heights	Tabitha Bowland	
2003	Blind Horizon	Liz Culpepper	
2004	The Butterfly Effect	Kayleigh Miller	
2004	Win a Date with Tad Hamilton!	Nurse Betty	
2004	Starsky & Hutch	Holly Monk	
2004	Willowbee	Burglar	Short film
2005	Bigger Than the Sky	Grace Hargrove / Roxanne	
2005	The Best Man	Sarah Marie Barker	
2005	Just Friends	Jamie Palamino	
2006	Peaceful Warrior	Joy	
2006	Crank	Eve Lydon	
2008	Life in Flight	Catherine Sargent	
2008	Mirrors	Angela Carson	
2008	Seventh Moon	Melissa	
2009	Love N' Dancing	Jessica Donovan	
2009	Crank: High Voltage	Eve Lydon / Lemon	
2010	Dead Awake	Natalie	
2011	House of the Rising Sun	Jenny Porter	
2011	The Reunion	Nina Cleary	
2012	Columbus Circle	Lillian Hart	
2013	No Clue	Kyra	
2014	Break Point	Heather	
2014	Bad Country	Lynn Weiland	
2014	The Single Moms Club	Hillary Massey	
2014	Flight 7500	Pia Martin	
2014	Among Ravens	Wendy Conifer	
2015	Zoey to the Max	Samantha Jenkins	
2015	Hangman	Melissa	
2016	Patient Seven	Mother	Segment: "The Visitant"
2017	Apple of My Eye	Caroline Andrews	
2017	The Keeping Hours	Amy	
2018	Mississippi Requiem		
2018	Avengers of Justice: Farce Wars	Jean Wonder	
2019	The Brawler	Linda Wepner	
2021	13 Minutes	Kim	
2022	Tyson's Run	Eloise	
2023	The Christmas Classic	Lynn Byrd	
2024	Rally Caps	Nora	

=== Television ===
Year	Title	Role	Notes
1996	Her Costly Affair	Dee	Television film
1999	Brookfield	Daly Roberts	Unsold TV pilot
1999–2001	Felicity	Ruby	Recurring role (seasons 2–3)
2000	The '70s	Christie Shales	Miniseries
2003, 2009	Scrubs	Jamie Moyer	4 episodes
2005–2011	Robot Chicken	Various characters	Voice role; 6 episodes
2006	Smith	Annie	Main role
2008	The Meant to Be's	Janine	Unsold TV pilot
2009	See Kate Run	Katherine Sullivan	Unsold TV pilot
2011	12 Dates of Christmas	Kate Stanton	Television film
2011–2012	Shameless	Jasmine Hollander	Recurring role, 6 episodes
2012	Men at Work	Lisa	Episodes: Pilot, "Super Milo"
2012	Bad Girls	Brandi	Unsold TV pilot
2014	Justified	Alison Brander	Recurring role (season 5), 9 episodes
2014	Run for Your Life	Meredith Redmond	Television film
2016	Angie Tribeca	Stacy	Episode: "Commissioner Bigfish"
2016	Maron	Nina	2 episodes
2016	Sister Cities	Young Mary Baxter	Television film
2017	Law & Order: Special Victims Unit	Karla Wyatt	Episode: "Gone Fishin"
2017	Love at First Glance	Mary Landers	Television film
2018	MacGyver	Dixie/Dawn	Episodes: "Mardi Gras Beads+Chair", "Benjamin Franklin + Grey Duffle"
2020–2022	Stargirl	Barbara Whitmore	Main role
2024	Held Hostage in My House	Dawn Van Brocklin	Television film

== Awards and nominations ==
Year	Association	Category	Work	Result	Refs
2000	Teen Choice Awards	Choice Chemistry (with Breckin Meyer)	Road Trip	Nominated	
2004	MTV Movie Awards	Best Kiss	Starsky & Hutch	Won	
2009	Teen Choice Awards	Choice Music/Dance Actress	Love N' Dancing	Nominated	
