= Campfire Tales (1991 film) =

- Film Poster
- Directed by: William Cooke; Paul Talbot
- Written by: William Cooke; Paul Talbot
- Produced by: Paul Talbot
- Starring: Gunnar Hansen; Robin Roberts; Tres Holton; Courtney Ballard
- Cinematography: William Cooke
- Edited by: William Cooke; Paul Talbot; Roger Thomas
- Music by: Kevin Green; Stan Lollis
- Production company: Crimson Productions
- Distributed by: KB Releasing
- Release date: 1991
- Running time: 88 minutes
- Country: United States
- Language: English

Campfire Tales is a 1991 American anthology horror film written and directed by William Cooke and Paul Talbot. The film is about a group of teenagers telling ghost stories around a campfire. One of the storytellers is horror legend Gunnar Hansen. The movie also uses many elements from famous horror stories and directors (Lucio Fulci specifically).

== Plot ==
The first story involves a young couple returning home after hearing on the radio that a murderer with a hook on his right hand has escaped from the local insane asylum and is terrorizing the countryside. Upon returning home, the girlfriend discovers that her parents have been decapitated. As she runs to get help from her boyfriend she discovers that he has also fallen victim to the hook. A battle ensues and she comes out victorious, killing the escaped prisoner with his own hook.

The second story involves two stoners searching for marijuana. Upon finding a large quantity, and a very strange drug dealer, they return home to smoke it. When they awaken they are sickly and appear to be rotting. They return to get more and notice that the dealer is suffering from the same symptoms. But they take no notice and return home to indulge once again. Again, they awaken more sickly than before. Instead of seeking medical treatment they return to the dealer, only to find that he is no longer there. His plants are still in the apartment and the two take all of the plants with them back to their place. They indulge once again. As they smoke, they begin to fall apart and eventually turn to slime.

The third story has to do with a greedy, selfish man returning home to his mother for Christmas. He kills her for the inheritance, pushing her down the stairs leading into the basement. He leaves the body and heads over to his brother's house to watch his two children while he and his wife leave for the emergency room due to the husband breaking his arm putting up their Christmas Tree. The children tell him a tale about an evil Santa Claus known as "Satan Claus" who comes and punishes those who do evil things throughout the year. He leaves to head back to his mother's house, plotting what he is going to tell the police and his brother. Upon returning he is attacked by Satan Claus, who rips his heart out.

The fourth story and final story is about a shipwrecked pirate on a desolate island. He discovers a man who warns him about buried treasure on the island being guarded by zombies. The pirate kills the man and goes in search for the treasure, ignoring the man's warnings. He discovers the treasure only to be attacked by a large group of pirate zombies. After running from them for some time, the zombies eventually catch and kill him.

The wrap around story involves the young men going to sleep with the narrator revealing a hook on his right hand.

== Cast ==
=== "Campfire Segments" ===
- Gunnar Hansen as Ralph
- Robin Roberts as Jason
- Tres Holton as Billy
- Courtney Ballard as Danny

=== "The Hook" ===
- Lora Podell as Susan
- H. Ray York as The Hook
- Johnny Tamblyn as Jim

=== "Overtoke" ===
- Jeff Jordan as Chris
- David Avin as Larry
- Kevin Draine as Martin
- Michael R. Smith as Frank
- Terrill Douglas as Addict
- Bob Gonzalez as Addict
- Walter Kaufmann as Addict

=== "The Fright Before Xmas" ===
- Paul Kaufmann as Steve
- Barbara Jackson as Mother
- Walter Kaufmann as Joe
- Lori Tate as Cheryl
- Josh Craig as Chucky
- Sarah Craig as Susie
- Michael R. Smith as Satan Claus

=== "Skull and Crossbones" ===
- Lawrence E. Campbell as The Pirate
- Harold Odom as The Black Man
- William Cooke as The Cabin Boy
- F. Douglas Gore as Zombie
- Eric John Litra as Zombie
- Dan Rogers as Zombie
- Tracy Huggins as Zombie
- Michael R. Smith as Zombie

== Reception ==
Website Mondo Digital wrote about the film: "Despite the immediate presence of Hansen, Campfire Tales may be a bit difficult for jaded horror fans to warm up to; the first half hour or so is standard zero-budget fare with only an unusual amount of gore to distinguish it. Stick with it, though, and you'll be well rewarded; the last two stories really pay off with a fine mix of storytelling, grue, and sick laughs; coupled with some atmospheric camerawork and nifty monster effects. " The Video Graveyard gave it two and a half stars.

== Re-release ==
The film was re-released on DVD in 2002 from Sub Rosa.
