= Michael Rooker =

American actor (born 1955)

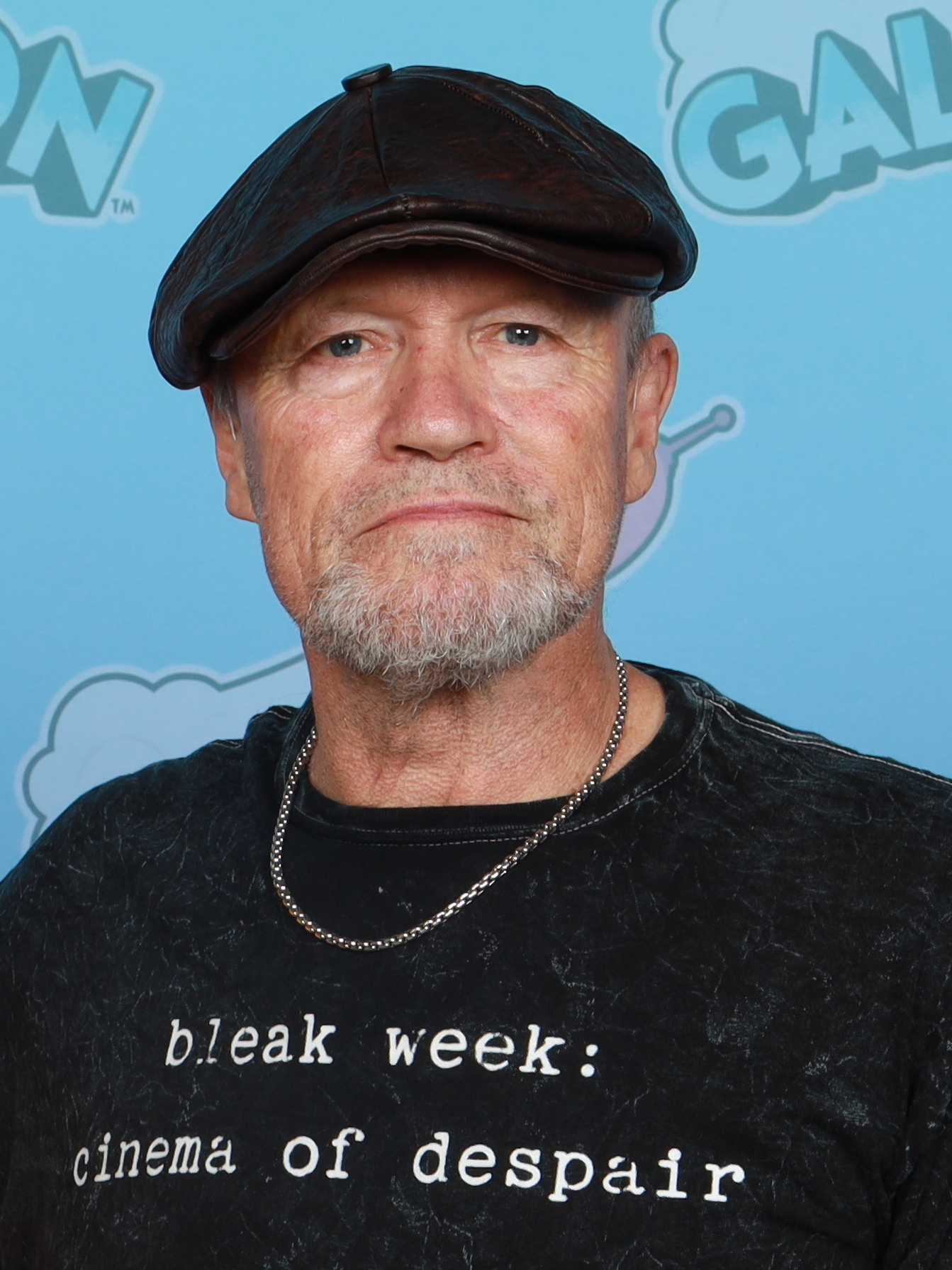
- Rooker at the 2025 GalaxyCon Raleigh
- Born: April 6, 1955 (age 71); Jasper, Alabama, U.S.
- Education: DePaul University (BFA)
- Occupation: Actor
- Years active: 1986–present
- Spouse: Margot Rooker (m. 1979)
- Children: 2

Michael Rooker (born April 6, 1955) is an American actor. He first rose to prominence for portraying the titular role in Henry: Portrait of a Serial Killer (1986), and is best known for starring as Merle Dixon in the AMC series The Walking Dead (2010–2013) and as Yondu Udonta in Guardians of the Galaxy (2014), its sequel Guardians of the Galaxy Vol. 2 (2017), as well as a cameo in Guardians of the Galaxy Vol. 3 (2023). He is a recurring collaborator of Guardians of the Galaxy director and co-CEO of DC Studios James Gunn, appearing in all of his films to date including Slither (2006), Super (2010) and The Suicide Squad (2021), along with the TV series Peacemaker.

Rooker's other notable roles include Chick Gandil in Eight Men Out (1988), Frank Bailey in Mississippi Burning (1988), Terry Cruger in Sea of Love (1989), Rowdy Burns in Days of Thunder (1990), Bill Broussard in JFK (1991), Hal Tucker in Cliffhanger (1993), Sherman McMaster in Tombstone (1993), Jared Svenning in Mallrats (1995), Detective Howard Cheney in The Bone Collector (1999), and Buddy in F9 (2021).

== Early life ==
Rooker was born in Jasper, Alabama. He has nine brothers and sisters. His parents divorced when he was 13, and he moved with his mother and siblings to Chicago, where he attended Wells Community Academy High School and studied at the Goodman School of Drama at DePaul University.

== Career ==
Rooker made his film debut in 1986, playing the title role in Henry: Portrait of a Serial Killer, based on the confessions of serial killer Henry Lee Lucas. He was acting in a play when the play's director, who was going to do the prosthetics for Henry, told him about the role. Rooker did not care if the script was good or bad; he just wanted to act in a film as it would "challenge" him. Henry was a critical success and Rooker received more film roles.

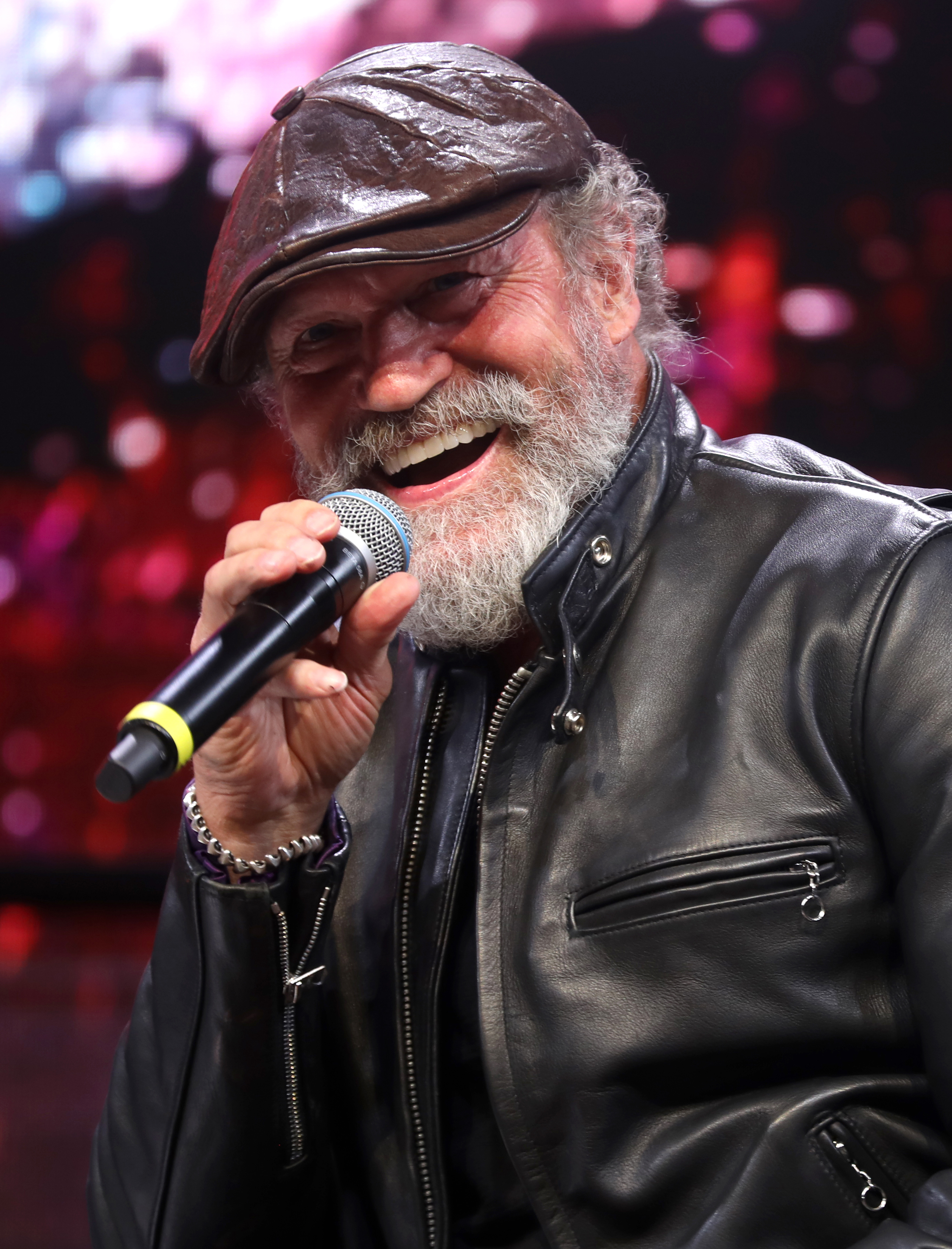
Rooker in 2024

He was given more dramatic roles in films such as Eight Men Out, Mississippi Burning, and JFK, but he became widely known for his roles in action and thriller films such as Sea of Love, Days of Thunder, Cliffhanger, and Tombstone. He also starred in Mallrats, Rosewood, The 6th Day, Slither, Jumper, Super and Hypothermia.

In June 2010, Rooker revealed via Twitter that he was to appear in the AMC television series The Walking Dead as Merle Dixon, one of the survivors of a zombie apocalypse. He guest-starred in two episodes of the first season and one of the second season before becoming a series regular for the third season.

Rooker is also known for his roles in video games, such as Call of Duty: Black Ops (where he played himself), Mike Harper in Call of Duty: Black Ops 2 in November 2012, and as Merle in The Walking Dead: Survival Instinct, the video game based on the television series.

He played Yondu Udonta in the Marvel Studios film Guardians of the Galaxy, directed by James Gunn, and reprised the role in Guardians of the Galaxy Vol. 2 (2017) as well as The Guardians of the Galaxy Holiday Special (2022). In 2021 he appeared in the action film F9, directed by Justin Lin. In 2025 he appeared in five episodes of the TV series The Righteous Gemstones.

== Personal life ==
Rooker lives in California with his wife Margot. They married in 1979 and have two daughters, Alynne and Gillian. He practices the Kyokushin style of karate.

== Filmography ==
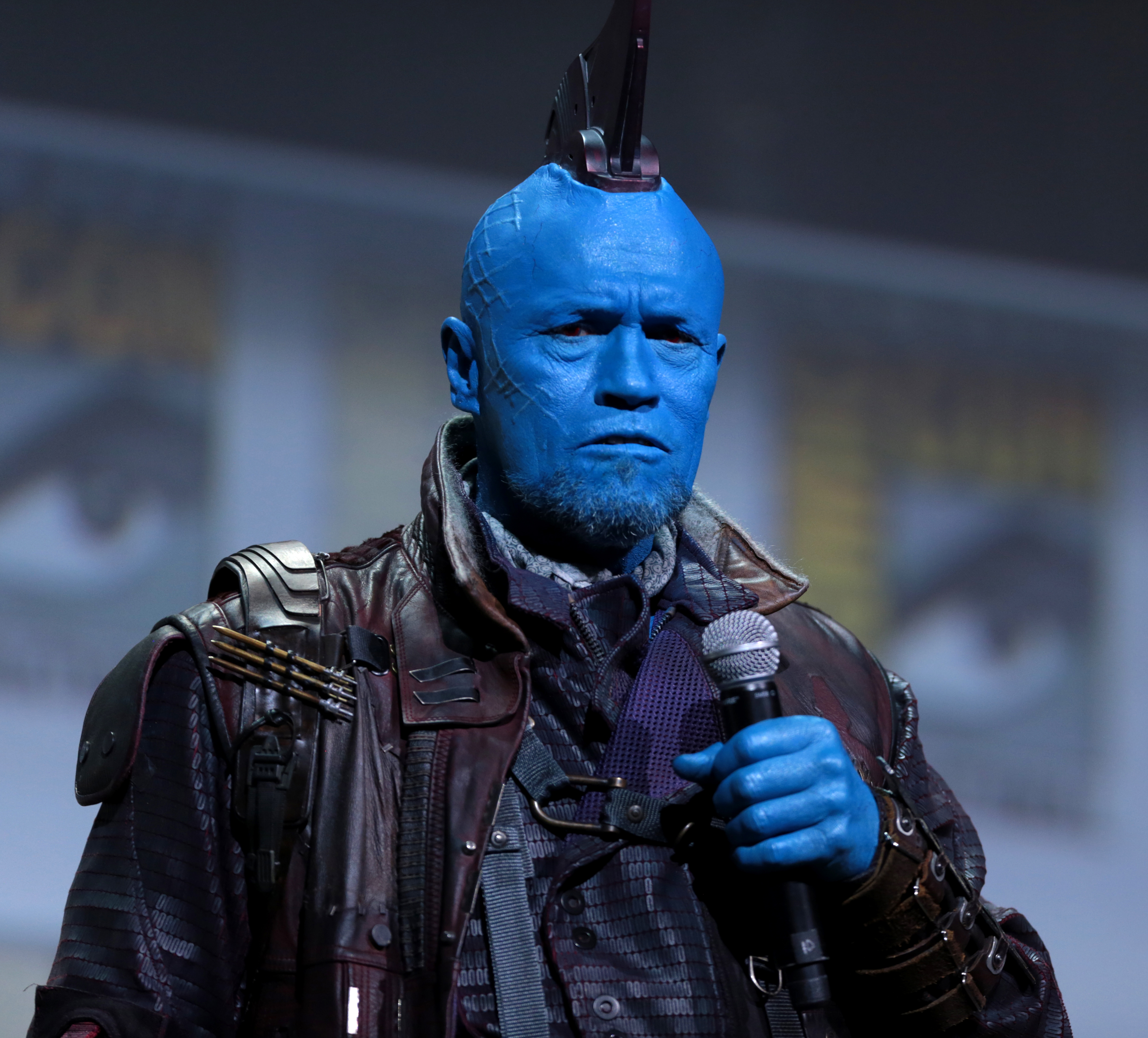
Rooker at the 2016 San Diego Comic-Con, in character as Yondu from Guardians of the Galaxy

=== Film ===
Year	Title	Role	Notes
1986	Henry: Portrait of a Serial Killer	Henry	Fantasporto Award for Best Actor; Golden Space Needle Award for Best Actor; Nominated—Independent Spirit Award for Best Male Lead
1987	Light of Day	Oogie	
1987	Rent-A-Cop	Joe	
1988	Above the Law	Man in bar	
1988	Eight Men Out	Arnold "Chick" Gandil	
1988	Retreads	Hash	
1988	Mississippi Burning	Frank Bailey	
1989	Sea of Love	Terry Cruger	
1989	Music Box	Karchy Laszlo	
1990	Days of Thunder	Rowdy Burns	
1991	JFK	Bill Broussard	
1993	The Dark Half	Sheriff Alan Pangborn	
1993	Cliffhanger	Ranger Hal Tucker	
1993	Tombstone	Sherman McMasters	
1994	Suspicious	Attendant	Short film
1994	The Hard Truth	Jonah Mantz	
1995	Mallrats	Jared Svenning	
1996	Bastard Out of Carolina	Uncle Earle	
1996	The Trigger Effect	Gary	
1997	Song of Hiawatha	Bertrand	
1997	Rosewood	Sheriff Walker	
1997	Keys to Tulsa	Keith Michaels	
1997	Deceiver	Kennesaw	
1997	Shadow Builder	Father Vassey	
1998	The Replacement Killers	Detective Stan "Zeedo" Zedkov	
1998	Brown's Requiem	Fritz Brown	Also associate producer
1998	Renegade Force	Matt Cooper	
1999	A Table for One	Matt Draper / Dr. Matthew Swan	Also co-executive producer
1999	The Bone Collector	Captain Howard Cheney	
2000	Table One	Rowdy	
2000	Here on Earth	Malcolm Arnold	
2000	NewsBreak	John McNamara	
2000	The 6th Day	Robert Marshall	
2001	Replicant	Detective Jake Riley	
2002	Undisputed	Captain A.J. Mercker	
2003	The Box	Detective Stafford	
2004	The Eliminator	Miles Dawson	
2005	Chasing Ghosts	Mark Spencer	
2006	Repo! The Genetic Opera	Repo Man	Unreleased short film
2006	Lenexa, 1 Mile	Russ	
2006	Slither	Grant Grant	
2007	Whisper	Sidney	
2008	The Lena Baker Story	Randolph County Sheriff	
2008	Jumper	William Rice	
2008	This Man's Life	Richard Crummly	Short film
2009	Super Capers	Judge / Dark Winged Vesper	
2009	Penance	Mann	
2009	The Marine 2	Church	Direct-to-DVD
2010	Scott's Dead	Mitch	Short film
2010	Freeway Killer	Detective St. John	
2010	Blood Done Sign My Name	Defense Attorney Billy Watkins	
2010	Cell 213	Ray Clement	
2010	DC Showcase: Jonah Hex	Red Doc	Voice, short film
2010	Louis	Pat McMurphy	
2010	Super	Abe	
2011	Atlantis Down	Father / Alien	
2011	Mysteria	Captain McCarthy	
2011	Elwood	Condello	Short film
2012	The Lost Episode	Chris / Dr. Death	Also director
2012	Hypothermia	Ray Pelletier	
2013	Brother's Keeper	Chief Carver	
2014	Guardians of the Galaxy	Yondu Udonta	
2016	The Belko Experiment	Bud Melks	
2017	Guardians of the Galaxy Vol. 2	Yondu Udonta	Nominated—Saturn Award for Best Supporting Actor
2019	Bolden	Pat McMurphy	
2019	Brightburn	The Big T	Cameo
2020	Fantasy Island	Damon	
2020	Love and Monsters	Clyde	
2021	F9	Buddy	
2021	The Suicide Squad	Brian Durlin / Savant	
2021	Vivo	Lutador	Voice
2022	Corrective Measures	Overseer Warden Devlin	
2022	White Elephant	Gabriel Tancredi	
2023	Guardians of the Galaxy Vol. 3	Yondu Udonta	Cameo
2023	The Out-Laws	Agent Oldham	
2024	Horizon: An American Saga – Chapter 1	Sgt. Major Riordan	
2024	Horizon: An American Saga – Chapter 2	Sgt. Major Riordan	
2025	Superman	Superman Robot 1	Voice

=== Television ===
Year	Title	Role	Notes	Source
1986	Crime Story	Lieutenant	Episode: "Pilot"	
1988	The Equalizer	Bill Whitaker	Episode: "No Place Like Home"	
1989	Gideon Oliver	Det. John Quinn	Episode: "Sleep Well, Professor Oliver"	
1989	The Edge	Deputy Sheriff	Television film	
1989	L.A. Takedown	Bosko	Television film	
1990	Equal Justice	Wallace "Wally" Dalton	Episode: "Sugar Blues"	
1992	Afterburn	Casey "Z" Zankowski	Television film	
1995	Fallen Angels	Babe McCloor	Episode: "Fly Paper"	
1995	Johnny & Clyde	Frank Tennant	Television film	
1996	Back to Back	Bob Malone	Television film	
2001	The Outer Limits	Col. Beckett	Episode: "Patient Zero"	
2001	Hostage Rescue Team	Special Agent Nicholas Roberts	Pilot	
2002	Jeremiah	Major Quantrell	Episode: "Firewall"	
2003	Tremors	Kinney	Episode: "Hit and Run"	
2003	Lucky	Gibby	Episode: "Savant"	
2003	Stargate SG-1	Col. Edwards	Episode: "Enemy Mine"	
2003	CSI: Miami	Marty Jones	Episode: "Dead Zone"	
2003	On Thin Ice	Hopkins	Television film	
2003	Saving Jessica Lynch	Col. Curry	Television film	
2004	Skeleton Man	Capt. Leary	Television film	
2004	Las Vegas	Marcus Wexler	Episode: "Degas Away with It"	
2005	Numb3rs	Don's Partner	Unaired pilot	
2005	JAG	Capt. Jack Ramsey	Episode: "Heart of Darkness"	
2006	Thief	Det. John Hayes	5 episodes	
2007	Crossing Jordan	Shawn Curaco	Episode: "D.O.A."	
2008	Law & Order	Jamie Yost	Episode: "Executioner"	
2008	Shark	Oscar Riddick	Episode: "Bar Fight"	
2008	Chuck	Frank Mauser	Episode: "Chuck Versus Santa Claus"	
2008	Humanzee!	Priest	Episode: "Pilot"	
2008	Scream Queens	Himself	Episode 6	
2009	Meteor	Calvin Stark	2 episodes	
2009	Criminal Minds	Chief Carlson	Episode: "House on Fire"	
2009	Psych	Garth Longmore	Episode: "Shawn Takes a Shot in the Dark"	
2010	Burn Notice	Dale Lawson	Episode: "Guilty as Charged"	
2010	Matadors	John Canterna	Pilot	
2010–2013	The Walking Dead	Merle Dixon	14 episodes Satellite Award for Best Cast – Television Series (2012)	
2012	Outlaw Country	Larkin's Henchman	Television film	
2012	Archer	Sheriff E.Z. Ponder	Voice, episode: "Bloody Ferlin"	
2016	Unlocked: The World of Games, Revealed	Himself	Documentary	
2017	SEAL Team	Big Chief	Episode: "Tip of the Spear"	
2017	Robot Chicken	Merle Dixon	Voice, episode: "The Robot Chicken Walking Dead Special: Look Who's Walking"	
2019	True Detective	Edward Hoyt	2 episodes	
2019	The Dark Tower	Eldred Jonas	Pilot	
2021–2024	What If...?	Yondu Udonta	Voice, 3 episodes	
2021	Creepshow	Beau	Episode: "Drug Traffic"	
2022	The Guardians of the Galaxy Holiday Special	Yondu Udonta	Voice, Disney+ special	
2023	The Rookie	Frank Tesca	2 episodes	
2024	Creature Commandos	Sam Fitzgibbon	Voice, episode: "Cheers to the Tin Man"	
2025	The Righteous Gemstones	Cobb Milsap	5 episodes	
2025	Peacemaker	Red St. Wild	3 episodes	

=== Video games ===
Year	Title	Voice role	Notes
2004	The Chronicles of Riddick: Escape from Butcher Bay	Centurion, Jack	
2006	Scarface:The World is yours	The Enforcer	
2011	Call of Duty: Black Ops	Himself	Appears in Call of the Dead
2011	Days of Thunder	Rowdy Burns	
2012	Lollipop Chainsaw	Vikke	
2012	Call of Duty: Black Ops II	Mike Harper	Also motion capture
2013	The Walking Dead: Survival Instinct	Merle Dixon	
2023	Crime Boss: Rockay City	Touchdown	
2025	Call of Duty: Black Ops 7	Mike Harper	Also motion capture

=== Music videos ===
Year	Artist	Song	Notes
2001	American Head Charge	All Wrapped Up	The video was banned due to violent imagery.
