= List of films featuring fictional films =

A body of films featuring fictional films as part of their narrative. These are also called films within films.

== List of films ==
Film	Fictitious film	Year	Description
Adaptation	The Orchid Thief	2002	In the comedy drama film, one of the twin brother protagonists adapts the 1998 book The Orchid Thief into a film and draws the jealousy of his brother.
After the Fox	The Gold of Cairo	1966	In this comedy film, crooks attempt to smuggle gold through an Italian village by pretending to make a neorealist film about gold smugglers. Facing delays, they wait by filming more scenes. The resulting footage is screened as evidence at their trial, where a film critic in attendance proclaims it to be a masterpiece.
All That Jazz	The Stand-Up	1979	A film directed and edited by the main character, Joe Gideon. A piece of the film, a monologue done on the five stages of grief by the titular stand-up comedian, is shown multiple times.
Alvin and the Chipmunks: Chipwrecked	Jungle Monster 4	2011	The film seems to be a parody of low budget monster films. The film may also be slight foreshadowing due to the fact that the chipmunks get stranded on an island.
An American Werewolf in London	See You Next Wednesday	1981	John Landis includes his favorite fictional film, this time as a pornographic movie showing in Piccadilly Circus. The fictional movie was actually the first thing to be shot in the production for the horror film, and starred Linzi Drew, a real Page 3 girl.
The Artist	A Russian Affair	2011	In the romantic comedy-drama film, Jean Dujardin is an actor who plays the hero in the film A Russian Affair in which he is rescued from a Russian villain by his dog.
Be My Cat: A Film for Anne	Be My Cat	2015	In the found footage horror movie, an aspiring Romanian filmmaker shoots a demo film to send to actress Anne Hathaway to convince her to star in his upcoming film. Moreover, the demo film is about the making of another fictional film.
Berberian Sound Studio	The Equestrian Vortex	2012	In the horror film, a sound engineer is tasked with working on the Foley effects for the never seen film.
Big Fat Liar	Big Fat Liar	2002	Marty Wolf, the main antagonist, produces a film under Wolf Pictures. This film however, plagiarises Jason Shepherd's English assignment. In the end, the film is released with Jason getting writing credits.
Blow Out	Coed Frenzy	1981	Jack Terry, played by John Travolta, works for a film production studio as a sound editor for cheap horror films, including the film.
The Big Lebowski	Logjammin'	1998	In the comedy film, the Dude watches a pornographic film with Maude and sees Bunny Lebowski starring in the film.
Boogie Nights	Brock Landers: Angels Live In My Town	1997	In the period drama film, Mark Wahlberg plays a rising porn actor. In part of his acting career, the character stars as a cop in a series of pornographic action films, with the partner played by John C. Reilly.
Bowfinger	Chubby Rain	1999	In the comedy film, film producer Bobby Bowfinger, played by Steve Martin, aims to produce his dream science fiction thriller film Chubby Rain and uses shots of an unsuspecting person, played by Eddie Murphy for the film.
Bowfinger	Fake Purse Ninjas	1999	In the comedy film, characters played by Steve Martin and Eddie Murphy infiltrate a factory where Chinese ninjas counterfeit goods.
Brief Encounter	Flames of Passion	1945	A film Laura and Alec see at the theatre on one of their Thursday rendezvous.
Broken City	Kiss of Life	2013	In the crime film, a softcore romance film is featured, which The New Yorker's Richard Brody described, "flowery dialogue and poetic views of nature are followed by the actress's hot and naked sex scene with the sensitive leading man."
Burn After Reading	Coming Up Daisy	2008	The black comedy film features a film based on a chick lit book by Cormac McCarthy.
Chicken Little	Chicken Little: The True Story	2005	Action film recently released to theaters based on the events of the main film.
Clerks	Happy Scrappy Hero Pup, numerous pornographic films including The Best of Both Worlds	1994	A mother asks for Happy Scrappy Hero Pup at the video store for her daughter. Randal is on the phone with the distributor and after ordering a large number of pornographic movies, asks the mother the film's name again. Later on in the film, he goes to Big Choice Video and rents a hermaphroditic pornographic film entitled The Best of Both Worlds.
Crocodile Dundee in Los Angeles	Lethal Agent III	2001	Mick Crocodile Dundee investigates the filming of a sequel to a box office bomb action film franchise, which is actually used as a cover up for smuggling several paintings looted during the Yugoslavian Civil Wars.
Contempt	Odyssey	1963	The film follows a screenwriter's marriage to his wife disintegrating as they shoot the film Odyssey directed by Fritz Lang playing himself.
Day for Night	Meet Pamela	1973	The film follows the lives of the cast and crew while they shoot the film Meet Pamela.
Daddy's Home 2	Missile Tow	2017	When they are returning from the winter home, the three families encounter a blizzard, causing them to seek shelter in a movie theatre, where they watch the Liam Neeson-led Missile Tow.
Death Becomes Her	Dark Windows	1992	In this black comedy film, Helen Sharp (Goldie Hawn) watches a movie starring her rival Madeline Ashton (Meryl Streep) and continuously rewinds and rewatches a scene in which Madeline's character is strangled to death onscreen.
Dirty Work	Men In Black Who Like To Have Sex With Each Other	1998	In the comedy film, two cinema employees (Norm MacDonald and Artie Lange) get revenge on their manager by replacing a print of Men In Black with a pornographic parody when the corporate bosses arrive to inspect the theatre.
Drive-In	Disaster '76	1976	This comedy film follows the adventures of various employees and patrons at a drive-in theater during a screening of a disaster film that includes allusions to everything from the Airport film series to The Towering Inferno to Jaws.
Everybody Dies by the End	Battery Acid, Psycho Menace, Kill Time Now	2022	In the horror comedy mockumentary, after making a handful cult films, Alfred Costella (Vinny Curran) returns to filmmaking to make one last picture with a dark twist.
Evil Ed	Loose Limbs 5	1997	In the horror comedy film, a newly hired film editor goes insane while editing the latest in a long running series of slasher films.
The Exorcist	Crash Course	1973	In the horror film, before the mother's daughter is possessed, the mother stars in a film about student activism.
The Fabelmans	Gunsmog, Escape to Nowhere	2022	The films within the film are fictionalized portrayals of the real-life amateur films Steven Spielberg made during his adolescence. Gunsmog is a western film that rips off John Ford's The Man Who Shot Liberty Valance (1962). Escape to Nowhere is an original war film set during World War II.
The Fall Guy	Metalstorm	2024	The sci-fi film within the film in which Colt Seavers (Ryan Gosling) is called in to perform stunts and find the missing lead actor. A reference to Metalstorm: The Destruction of Jared Syn, a real sci-fi film with which it shares a very similar tagline.
The Final Girls	Camp Bloodbath	2015	In the comedy horror film, the fictional film is entered by the protagonists to escape a fire in the theatre the fictional film is being shown in. The sequel to the fictional film is also referenced.
For Your Consideration	Home for Purim	2006	In the comedy film, the fictional film featured as a tribute to the Jewish holiday Purim. The studio executives in For Your Consideration change the film's title to Home for Thanksgiving to avoid isolating Gentile audiences.
Friend of the World	Untitled art project	2020	In the horror comedy film, experimental filmmaker Diane Keaton (Alexandra Slade) is filming an art project when she runs into Gore (Nick Young), who has an outlook on war and propaganda.
Funny People	Re-Do	2009	In the comedy drama film, Adam Sandler plays a successful film actor who learns that he is dying of leukaemia and decides to revisit his stand-up comedy career. One of the actor's featured films was the comedy Re-Do, which starred him as trapped inside an ordinary baby's body.
Grindhouse	Machete, Werewolf Women of the SS, Don't, Thanksgiving, Hobo with a Shotgun	2007	Fake trailers made for the film. Machete, Thanksgiving, and Hobo with a Shotgun were eventually made into real films.
History of the World Part I	History of the World Part II	1981	A trailer for a sequel to the title film that was never planned on being made. A television series with that name premiered in 2023.
The Holiday	Deception	2006	In the romantic comedy film, one of the main characters is a movie trailer producer. One of her featured works is the action film Deception starring James Franco and Lindsay Lohan in the film.
Holy Motors	Untitled monster movie	2012	In the fantasy film, the protagonist creates a motion capture performance with a female counterpart, which is later revealed to be two snakelike creatures.
Home Alone	Angels with Filthy Souls	1990	In the family comedy film, Kevin McCallister is accidentally left at home during Christmas when his family went to Paris without him. Kevin watches Angels with Filthy Souls (a parody of the 1938 film Angels with Dirty Faces) which his parents and his uncle forbade him to watch. He later uses the film to distract burglars that break into his home.
Home Alone 2: Lost in New York	Angels with Even Filthier Souls	1992	In the family comedy sequel, Kevin McCallister watches the sequel to Angels with Filthy Souls. Home Alone 2's director studied 1930s and 1940s film noir to make Angels with Even Filthier Souls appear authentic.
The Icicle Thief	The Icicle Thief	1989	In the comedy film, an Italian neorealist black and white film is broadcast on television and repeatedly interrupted by full colour commercials. The television audience, watching in their homes, are completely oblivious of the interruptions even when a model from one of the commercials end up in the nested film's universe.
I'm Thinking of Ending Things	Untitled Robert Zemeckis movie	2020	An unnamed janitor is watching a corny film about a café waitress who gets fired after her boyfriend makes a scene while she's working. When the credits roll, Robert Zemeckis is credited as the director.
Inglourious Basterds	Stolz der Nation	2009	The war film features a Nazi propaganda film called Nation's Pride (German: Stolz der Nation) that is a key plot element in the film's climax.
Inland Empire	On High in Blue Tomorrows	2006	The film centers around actress Nikki Grace (Laura Dern), who gets a role in a remake of a cursed Polish film.
Invasion Force	Untitled action movie	1990	This film's plot starts with the shooting of an unnamed action film. Additionally, as the film itself ends, it is revealed to be a film shooting of its own.
Jay and Silent Bob Strike Back	Good Will Hunting 2: Hunting Season, Bluntman and Chronic	2001	In the comedy film, the duo Jay and Silent Bob encounter the making of Good Will Hunting 2: Hunting Season, a satirical sequel to Good Will Hunting. The making of the sequel also featured the original film's director Gus Van Sant and its stars, Matt Damon and Ben Affleck. Bluntman and Chronic is a fictional movie based on Holden McNeil and Banky Edwards' comic from Chasing Amy, where Mark Hamill plays a villain named Cocknocker, and fights the titular characters.
Jingle All the Way	Turbo Man: The Motion Picture	1996	In the festive comedy film, whilst Arnold Schwarzenegger is driving all around toy stores around the area to find the doll of the fictional super hero Turbo Man, he is seen driving past the town's cinema showing Turbo Man: The Motion Picture on the day.
Joker: Folie à Deux	Untitled TV movie	2024	In the film, the characters mention a TV film based on the events which happened in Joker numerous times.
Johnny Dangerously	Your Testicles and You	1984	A public health film about the fictional condition, "Enlarged Scrotum Syndrome"
The Kentucky Fried Movie	A Fistful of Yen	1977	In the comedy film, the spoof film combines elements of exploitation film, television commercials, pornography, and the martial arts film Enter the Dragon (1973).
Kiss of the Spider Woman	Her Real Glory	1985	Set in a prison, the film centers on a dialogue between two very different cellmates, as one regales the other with retellings of an old movie, whose themes mirror those of the characters.
Last Action Hero	Hamlet / Jack Slater III & IV	1993	In the meta-action comedy film, Arnold Schwarzenegger's character is featured as playing both Hamlet and Jack Slater, the latter being a parody of the actor's own action-film characters
Living in Oblivion	Living in Oblivion	1995	In the independent black comedy film, Nick Reve (Steve Buscemi) is the director of the movie of the same name.
The Man Who Killed Don Quixote	The Man Who Killed Don Quixote	2018	A comedy about a director, Toby Grummett (Adam Driver), who is in production on a commercial about Don Quixote. He reencounters his student film project sharing the title of the movie and subsequently reunites with its actors, including one (Jonathan Pryce), who now believes himself to be Don Quixote.
Matinee	Mant!	1993	In the period comedy film, an independent filmmaker produces a creature feature called Mant! that shows the combination of a man and an ant.
MaXXXine	The Puritan II	2024	A horror film set in 1985 about an adult film star Maxine Minx (Mia Goth) who seeks to get out of the adult entertainment and become a film star. She lands the lead role in the horror film The Puritan II, directed by Elizabeth Bender (Elizabeth Debicki).
Mortal Kombat II	Uncaged Fury	2026	The Scene Shows Johnny Cage (Karl Urban) Kick Some Serious Ass in the Old School Action Flick from the 90's.
A Movie Star	Big Hearted Jack	1916	In the silent comedy film, Mack Swain stars as a fictitious movie star who attends one of his latest movie screenings at a local Nickelodeon. He attempts to sway the audience, and the attending critic, into liking the film. It was the world's first film to utilize the technique of featuring a film within a plot.
Mickey's Gala Premier (short)	Gallopin' Romance	1933	The plot revolves around Mickey Mouse and Minnie Mouse playing music together, when suddenly Peg Leg Pete kidnaps Minnie and drives off on a horse. Mickey chases him and beats Pete in the end, bringing Minnie to safety.
My Dinner with Andre	Violets are Blue!	1981	About murders on a submarine.
Mr. Bean's Holiday	Playback Time	2007	A pretentious drama film by Carson Clay (Willem Dafoe) shown at the 2006 Cannes Film Festival.
Notting Hill	Helix	1999	In the romantic comedy, the actress played by Julia Roberts is in London to promote her new science fiction film Helix.
Once Upon a Time in Hollywood	Operazione Dyne-O-Mite, Nebraska Jim, Tanner, Kill Me Quick Ringo, Said the Gringo, The 14 Fists of McCluskey	2019	In the period comedy film, Rick Dalton, portrayed by Leonardo DiCaprio, moves to Italy to star in Spaghetti Westerns.
Paris When It Sizzles	The Girl Who Stole the Eiffel Tower	1964	Richard Benson is writing a film and only has two days to finish it so he hires Gabrielle Simpson to type it for him.
Pavements	Range Life	2024	A high budget biopic about Pavement
Pearl	Palace Follies	2022	In a period horror film set in 1918, a mentally disturbed farm girl Pearl Douglas (Mia Goth) watches a silent film Palace Follies while visiting town, which fuels her dream of becoming a movie star.
Pee-wee's Big Adventure	Pee-wee's Big Adventure	1985	In the final scene, Pee-wee and his friends are at a drive-in theatre, watching a film that combines some of Pee-wee's earlier adventures with elements of a James Bond-style spy thriller.
Planet Terror	Machete	2007	Preceding the zombie film is a trailer for Machete that features Danny Trejo as a former Mexican federate who seeks revenge on those from both sides of the border who betrayed him. It was later made into a full length feature film, also called Machete.
Perfect Blue	Double Bind	1997	In this psychological thriller, the main character has a minor role filming a fictional drama named Double Bind, which closely parallels her real life double bind.
The Player	Habeas Corpus	1992	In the comedy film, a depressing film about a woman on death row is pitched, and it eventually becomes produced but changed to have a feel good ending.
The Purple Rose of Cairo	The Purple Rose of Cairo	1985	A character in the fictional film steps out of the screen.
Reboot Camp	Sects Sell	2021	In the mockumentary comedy, the main characters are shooting a fictional documentary.
The Reluctant Dragon	How to Ride a Horse	1941	A Goofy "how-to" cartoon in which a narrator is trying to teach Goofy, how to ride a horse. This short was actually released as a standalone short on February 4, 1950
Scary Movie	Amistad II	2000	In this horror parody film, Brenda Meeks and Ray Wilkins go to a theater to watch Shakespeare in Love. Before the start of the movie, a trailer for a fictional sequel to Amistad is shown.
Schlock	See You Next Wednesday	1973	John Landis' first film includes two references and a poster for this fictional movie, which then turned into a running gag for most of his career and has been referenced in many other movies and television shows.
Scott Pilgrim vs. the World	You Just Don't Exist	2010	In the comedy film, Scott Pilgrim confronts one of his girlfriend's ex boyfriends, who is a skateboarder and actor producing the action film You Just Don't Exist.
Scream 2	Stab	1997	The slasher film Scream 2 features Stab, a film produced based on the events that took place in the first film Scream (1996).
Sherlock Jr.	Heart and Pearls	1924	In the silent comedy film, the protagonist dreams that he appears in a melodrama and solves the mystery as Sherlock Jr.
The Simpsons Movie	Itchy and Scratchy: The Movie	2007	There was an Itchy and Scratchy: The Movie movie on The Simpsons television show in an episode from November 1992, and at the beginning of The Simpsons Movie, the Simpsons are watching this, a possible sequel to the movie, or a short film playing before another film.
Singin' in the Rain	The Dueling Cavalier	1952	The musical film's couple star in the musical film that ends in a modern day Broadway ballet.
South Park: Bigger, Longer & Uncut	Terrance and Phillip: Asses of Fire	1999	The musical comedy based on an obscene television series within the musical comedy based on an obscene television series serves as a self reflexive cautionary tale regarding censorship.
Spaceballs	Spaceballs 2: The Search for More Money	1987	In a line from the movie, Yoghurt says "Lord willing, we will all return in 'Spaceballs 2: The Search For More Money'".
Strange Brew	The Mutants of 2051 AD	1983	In the comedy film, the fictional film is a post apocalyptic thriller that copies Mad Max 2.
The Stunt Man	Barbed Wire Frontier	1980	The film features a World War I film in which a British prisoner of war escapes a German camp.
Sullivan's Travels	O Brother, Where Art Thou?	1942	In the comedy film, the fictional film is a serious commentary on the working class that the protagonist intends to make after having made numerous lightweight comedies.A film with that fictional title was later actually made in 2000.
Sweet Liberty	Sweet Liberty	1986	Shot on location in Sayeville, North Carolina, the film is a period drama set during the American Revolution with two of Hollywood's leading stars Elliot James (Michael Caine) and Faith Healy (Michelle Pfeiffer).
Teenage Sex and Death at Camp Miasma	Camp Miasma franchise	2026	The film centers around the fictitious long-running slasher franchise Camp Miasma, which protagonist Kris Williams (Hannah Einbinder) has been hired to direct a reboot of. She locates the actress of the original film’s “final girl” (Gillian Anderson) and the two watch the original Camp Miasma film together.
Their Finest	The Nancy Starling	2017	A British film about two young women who steal their father's fishing boat and sail it to France to help rescue soldiers during the evacuation of Dunkirk. The title of the film refers to the name of their boat.
This Is the End	Pineapple Express 2: Blood Red	2013	In this apocalyptic comedy film, Seth Rogen and James Franco discussed a possible sequel to the Pineapple Express, where Red wants Dale and Saul to assassinate Woody Harrelson because he's going to give a speech making weed legal ruining Red. The footage from the April Fools trailer was used in the film and was mentioned again when Franco plans to sacrifice himself.
Three Amigos	The Three Amigos, Dueling Cavelier, Shootin' For Love, Little Neddy Grab Your Gun, Those Darn Amigos!, Little Neddy Goes to War, Amigos! Amigos! Amigos!	1986	In the comedy film, the three protagonists feature in a silent film called The Three Amigos that defies the conventions of films of its genre. A rival actress Miss Rene (her character was deleted from the movie), is shown on a billboard in the film. The others are all movies some or all of the amigos starred in.
Top Five	Uprize!	2014	The film centers around the main character, an actor, trying to make the transition from silly comedy films to serious films that comment on society. The actor is frustrated that more people are not excited by or interested in the historical value of a film about the Haitian Revolution.
Tropic Thunder	Tropic Blunder	2008	The action comedy film features the production of a film based on a Vietnam War veteran's memoir. The actors that are involved in the production are also shown to be in other fictional films, such as Ben Stiller in Simple Jack and Jack Black in The Fatties: Fart 2. Another fictional film featured is Satan's Alley with two gay priests at a medieval church.
Trouble in Tahiti	Trouble in Tahiti	2001	The 2001 TV film production of the Leonard Bernstein one act opera about an housewife in a failing marriage who seeks solace one afternoon by watching a technicolor movie musical about a WWII flier pilot who is lost from his squadron and downed in Tahiti where the chieftain intends to sacrifice him to a volcano deity. The film is a parody of South Pacific and also is reflective of Bernstein's own qualms with the film production of On the Town.
UHF	Gandhi II, Conan the Librarian	1989	The comedy film features shows broadcast by the television channel U-62. Gandhi II is a sequel to Gandhi with Gandhi portrayed as tough and streetsmart, and Conan the Librarian is a parody of Robert Ervin Howard's Conan the Barbarian.
Variety Girl	Romeow & Julicat	1947	A George Pal Puppetoon is a cartoon being sound and voice recorded in this movie.
Who Framed Roger Rabbit	Somethin's Cookin', Pistol Packin' Possum, Babes in Arms, Herman's Shermans, The Wet Nurse, The Little Injun That Could, Roger's Baby Buggy Blunder	1988	Somethin's Cookin' is a live action/animation hybrid features the filming of a theatrical short starring Baby Herman and Roger Rabbit. It parodies golden age cartoons such as Looney Tunes. The others were all seen on movie posters in R.K. Maroon's office.
X	Untitled pornographic film	2022	In a slasher film set in 1979, three couples shoot a pornographic film at a farm owned by the elderly Howard and Pearl Douglas. Mia Goth plays a dual role as both Maxine Minx, one of the actresses, and Pearl.
Zelig	The Changing Man	1983	In the comedy mockumentary, there is a movie about Leonard Zelig.

== See also ==
- Story within a story
