= Sexuality in older age =

Aspect of senescence

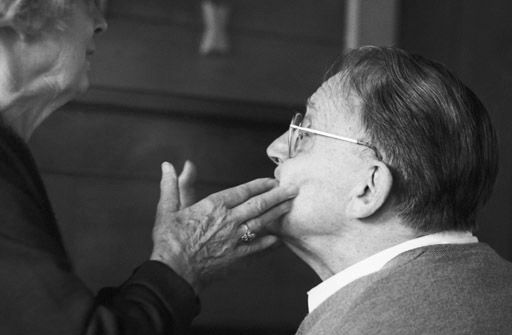
Exchange of affections among seniors in an old people's home

Sexuality in older age concerns the sexual drive, sexual activity, interests, orientation, intimacy, self-esteem, behaviors, and overall sexuality of people in middle age and old age, and the social perceptions concerning sexuality in older age. Older people engage in a variety of sexual acts from time to time for a variety of reasons. Desire for intimacy does not disappear with age, yet there are many restrictions placed on the elderly preventing sexual expressions and discouraging the fulfillment of sexual needs. Sexuality in older age is often considered taboo, yet it is considered to be quite a healthy practice; however, this stigma can affect how older individuals experience their sexuality. While the human body has some limits on the maximum age for reproduction, sexual activity can be performed or experienced well into the later years of life.

== Physical changes ==
Both male and female libidos tend to decline with increasing age, and women tend to lose their libido faster than men. However, the desire for sexual activity is not lost completely. Neither does it decrease for everyone. Menopause, a female biological process, has been linked to a loss of interest in sexual activity and to a desensitization of the genital area. In some cases, vaginal penetration can be painful for older women (see, for example, vaginismus). However, with the advent of hormone replacement therapy (HRT) treatments, the effects of menopause have lessened and women have more opportunities to continue experiencing an active sex life. Similarly, treatments for erectile dysfunction can make it possible for men to enjoy sexual activity again.

== Health benefits ==
It has been suggested that an active sex life can increase longevity among the elderly. Positive sexual health in older age is slowly becoming more of a commonplace idea with the steady increase in the percentage of the older population. This population percentage increase requires placing more attention on the needs of this age group, including their ideas on sexual health, desires, and attitudes. This shift in attitudes and behaviors has combined with medical advances to prolong a sexually active life and change the landscape of aging sexuality.

Sexual health and expression reflect a physical, mental, and emotional need that affects individual health and the quality of intimacy for older couples' relationships. Dr. Syme found that "Having a sexual partnership, with frequent sexual expression, having a good quality sex life, and being interested in sex have been found to be positively associated with health among middle-aged and older adults."

There are a number of associated health benefits to practicing positive sexual health. Positive sexual health often acts as a de-stressor promoting increased relaxation. Researchers also report health benefits detailing decreased pain sensitivity, improved cardiovascular health, lower levels of depression, increased self-esteem, and better relationship satisfaction. The former could also imply the consequences of negative sexual health and lack of sexual activity, such as depression, low self-esteem, increased frustration, and loneliness.

== Health risks and education ==
There are already numerous health concerns linked primarily with aging, but when sex is added into consideration, this opens up discussion for many other related concerns. Sex and aging come with many challenges for the older population as well as their primary care providers. The task for these care providers is to accommodate the changing needs of this older sexually active generation.

Common health conditions hindering older adults are illnesses such as cardiovascular disease, diabetes, degenerative and rheumatoid arthritis, stroke, cancer, kidney disease, and spinal cord injury. These conditions heavily impact individual sex lives. Separate from these are physical concerns related specifically to sexual health and bodily functions. Researchers gathered that, "the most common concerns for older adult men include erectile dysfunction and premature climax, and older adult women most commonly report lack of desire, problems with vaginal lubrication, sexual pain, and inability to reach orgasm." Consideration of these aging-related health problems and sexually related health problems together requires primary care providers and professionals to be updated on the latest health findings and to know patients' needs and possible solutions.

A major problem with improving education and seeking solutions for aging sexual health risks is the lack of verbal discussion on these matters from older individuals. "Older adults often avoid seeking help for sexual concerns because of a lack of knowledge about their sexual problems, embarrassment or discomfort talking about sex, and stigma-related beliefs about older adults and sexuality in older age being inappropriate."

Another major problem with improving education and seeking solutions for aging sexual health risks was found after researchers looked at the readiness and training of 777 physicians and 452 nurse practitioners from the American Medical Association Masterfile. Researchers noted that amongst their representative sample there were reports of limited training in sexual health as a general topic. From this information, they assumed that "training that is specific to older patients’ sexual health is limited, if available at all."

The purpose of the study was to test how knowledgeable U.S. primary care providers were on the topics of sexual health and sexuality in older age. The results of the study showcased that U.S. health care providers on average were less knowledgeable than U.S. graduate nursing students on the topics of sexual health and aging sexuality. In a comparison survey, it is also worth noting that they were reported to be less knowledgeable than Turkish physicians and U.S. Ob/Gyns. However, the group reported to be even less knowledgeable on aging sexuality than U.S. primary care providers which consisted of nursing home staff and older adult care workers. Educated health providers are needed to educate the general public and older adults (active and inactive) on sexual health and healthy expression.

Sexually transmitted infections (STDs/STIs) can also be prevalent in later life, despite common misconceptions that STDs only affect younger people and groups. There has been a steady increase in the number of STDs found in elderly individuals in nursing homes and other residential living communities, belying the perception that elderly people do not engage in sexual activity. Many men in older age do not believe they need to use protection, such as condoms, as they age, and their partners often feel likewise, so it can be difficult to stress the importance of continued use of protection for elderly couples. One of the main reasons they develop this opinion is because of the decreased risk of pregnancy, but they often fail to acknowledge that protection is necessary to prevent the circulation of STDs.

== Social attitudes ==
It is a common misconception that people lose interest in sex or become sexually inactive in older age. One survey in England of people aged 60-69 recorded 86% of men and 60% of women as sexually active.

A 2007 study of 3,005 American adults aged 57–85 found that reported sexual activity declined with age: 73% among those aged 57–64, 53% among those aged 65–74, and 26% among those aged 75–85.

Sex between elderly people is often treated as a taboo by society. Cultural norms dictated social opinions that painted older adults as being asexual creatures. This opinion was supported and replicated in the media by showing that sex is only popular among youth. This attitude has gradually changed because a greater number of people are reaching 55 and above, and are remaining sexually active far into their senior years.

Back in 1930, less than 6 percent of the U.S. population was over 65 years old. By 1950, the number was 8 percent. By 2015, that number had risen to almost 15 percent. Population experts at the U.S. Bureau of the Census expect the percentage to continue to rise dramatically during the next 20 years, eventually reaching 21 percent by 2050, which is more than one in five. The number of seniors in the United States and throughout the world continues to increase rapidly.

While sexual activity itself is a sensitive topic due to its private nature, sexual activity between seniors is often treated with extra care. This attitude is especially common among younger people and it has been suggested that this may be caused by younger people's belief that the lust and ability to have sex diminishes once a perceived primary reason for sex is no longer present.

Even though the topic may be taboo or denied, sexuality in older age has gained visibility in the media. Some sources promote "active" and "healthy" sexuality among the elderly, or address issues such as sexuality in retirement homes and assisted living facilities. These representations create in turn social injunctions that position sexual activity as a marker of fulfillment, a discourse already affecting younger people and amplified by various products, pills, and available medical treatments.

Research conducted in the social sciences changes the miserable depiction often made of elders' sexuality. Quantitative and qualitative studies show that sexual satisfaction can improve with age, and they present data such as the following. Half of women are sexually active into old age. Widows either stop any kind of sexual activity, find a new male partner, or choose not to reproduce the same kind of relationship where they take care of a man, instead entering into a nonresidential relationship with a man or in a relationship with another woman, for example. Women and gay men sustain the most pressure to live up to beauty ideals associated with youth. LGBT people suffer from invisibility in retirement homes and assisted-living facilities.

== LGBTQ+ representation ==
In general, many older adults who define themselves as a part of the LGBTQ+ community do not feel as comfortable talking to their physicians about sexual health. Many fear homophobic responses or believe that their GP is not willing to talk to them about sexual health.

== Representation in film and television ==
To many, The Golden Girls was groundbreaking in its depiction of healthy active sexual lifestyles and frank sexual discussion among seniors.

In the early 1990s, the British sitcom Waiting for God (TV series) featured two protagonists who were residents in a retirement home for older people, engaging in casual sex together.

The concept of active sexual relationships between older people has in recent years become a more mainstream topic. The film Something's Gotta Give, starring Jack Nicholson and Diane Keaton, explores the relationship that develops between two people in later life.

The HBO series Tell Me You Love Me has caused controversy by showing several explicit sex scenes involving two senior citizen actors on the show, Jane Alexander and David Selby.

On a related topic, intergenerational relationships, also quite taboo, were the focus of the film Gerontophilia (between a very old and a very young man), and in the last years many TV shows represented "cougars" (middle age women with younger men), for example The Cougar and Cougar Town.

The Netflix original, Grace and Frankie, features Jane Fonda and Lily Tomlin as two elderly women recently divorced from their husbands seeking guidance through life with the help of each other. Not only does the show highlight their sexual quests and struggles with their new partners, but it also mentions their new partnered business-seeking venture to encourage personal, private intimacy for women their age. The "Ménage à Moi", as they have it named, is a vibrator targeting elderly women to use for sexual satisfaction, and the show features the struggles surrounding marketing such a product.

In the Ti West horror film X, the two elderly Pearl seduce her husband Howard, and the two end up having sex with the main character Maxine trapped under the bed.
