= X (film series) =

American horror film series

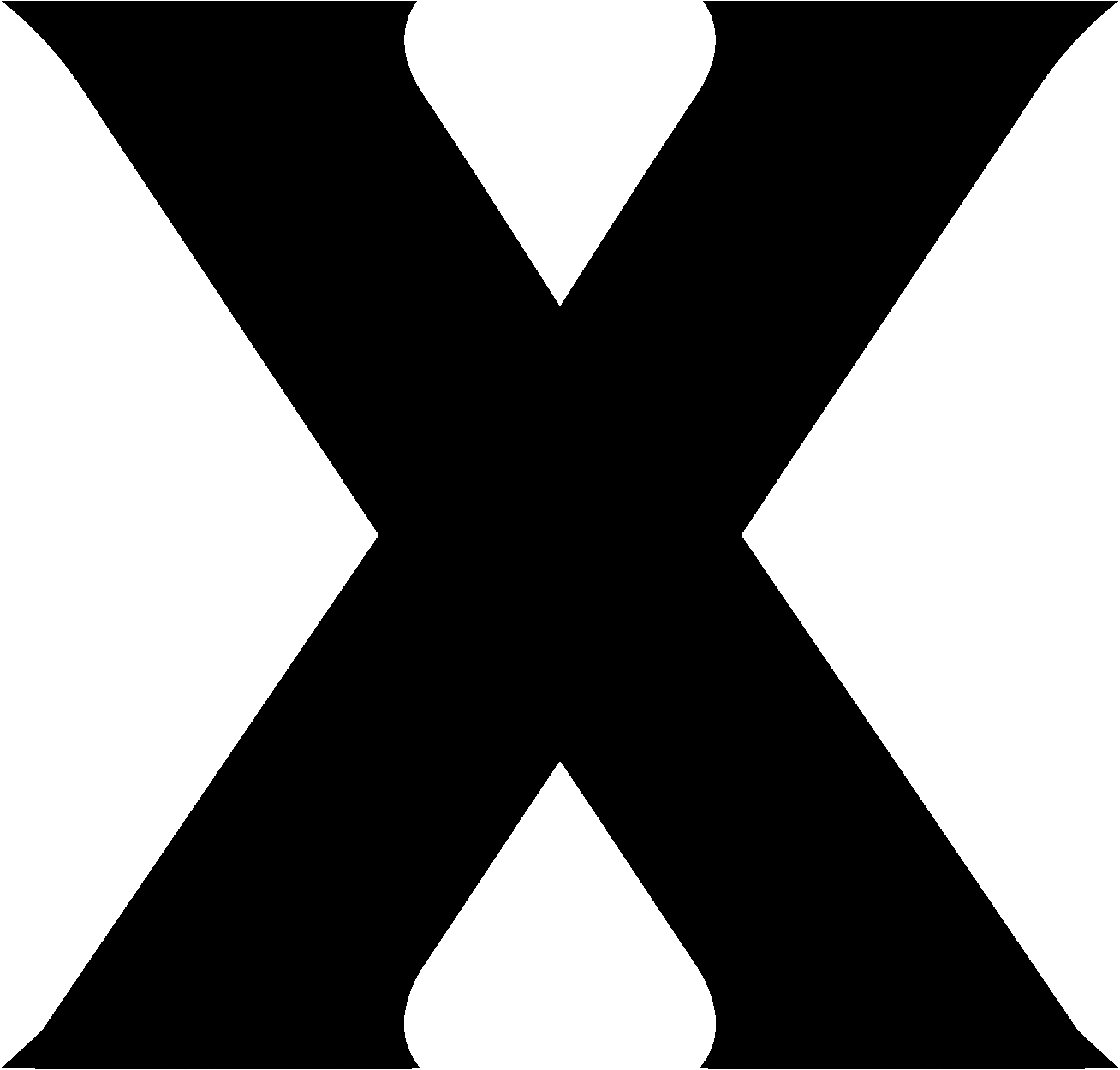
- Logo
- Directed by: Ti West
- Written by: Ti West; Mia Goth (Pearl)
- Produced by: Ti West; Kevin Turen; Jacob Jaffke; Harrison Kreiss; Mia Goth (MaXXXine)
- Starring: Mia Goth; See below
- Cinematography: Eliot Rockett
- Edited by: Ti West; David Kashevaroff (X)
- Music by: Tyler Bates; Chelsea Wolfe (X); Tim Williams (Pearl)
- Production companies: A24; Little Lamb (X and Pearl); Mad Solar Productions (X and Pearl); Motel Mojave (MaXXXine)
- Distributed by: A24
- Country: United States
- Language: English
- Budget: $12.2 million
- Box office: $45.5 million

The X film series consists of American horror films based on an original story written by Ti West. The series includes the original film X (2022), its prequel Pearl (2022), and its sequel MaXXXine (2024). The overall plot of the movies centers on two characters, Maxine Minx and Pearl, both portrayed by Mia Goth.

The first film was met with critical acclaim, and was a success at the box office. A tribute to slasher films of the past, the picture was deemed a horror film classic and impactful, anticipating its influence on the future of the genre. Pearl was also critically acclaimed, with some stating that it inadvertently improved the premise of the previous installment, and was also a success at the box office. MaXXXine was released on July 5, 2024. It received generally favorable reviews from critics and became the highest grossing film in the series.

== Films ==
Film	U.S. release date	Director	Screenwriter(s)	Producers
X	March 18, 2022	Ti West	Ti West	Ti West, Kevin Turen, Jacob Jaffke & Harrison Kreiss
Pearl	September 16, 2022	Ti West	Ti West & Mia Goth	Ti West, Kevin Turen, Jacob Jaffke & Harrison Kreiss
MaXXXine	July 5, 2024	Ti West	Ti West	Ti West, Mia Goth, Kevin Turen, Jacob Jaffke & Harrison Kreiss

Timeline
1918	Pearl
1919–1978
1979	X
1980–1984
1985	MaXXXine

=== X (2022) ===
In 1979 America, a team of amateur filmmakers are determined to create a new experience in cinema with an exploration in the adult film industry. Burlesque show owner and developer Wayne Gilroy decides that he will produce the project under his own conception, and hires a young and inexperienced director, RJ Nichols, whose reserved girlfriend Lorraine Day assists with the technical needs during the photography. Wayne's younger girlfriend, aspiring actress Maxine Minx, stars in the production, alongside pornographic stars Bobby-Lynne Parker and Jackson Hole. While on the road trip to rural Texas the group have their differences, but ultimately put these aside as Wayne believes that they will attain riches and fame with this project's innovation.

When they arrive at their remote location, an isolated cabin that Wayne rented from its elderly owners Howard and his ailing wife Pearl, they immediately begin production. Unbeknownst to the owners, they continue their sexual debauchery while Lorraine, at the discomfort of RJ, decides to take part in the climactic final scene as well. All the while, curiosity leads Pearl to investigate the cabin, only to find the sensual activities of the team. Jealous of their youth and sexuality, angered by her aging body, and longing for a time when she, too, sought stardom, the aged woman begins a rampage upon them one by one. When Howard learns of what has been happening on his property, he helps his wife in her mission to slaughter the young film crew. As a massacre begins to unfold, the group fight to survive the night.

=== Pearl (2022) ===
In 1918 America, Pearl is a young and ambitious woman with desires for celebrity on a national scale. An avid fan of motion pictures and dancing, she expresses her desires to become a star to her family. Though her husband is away in the military during World War I, she stays at the home of her parents, must abide by their reserved and strict expectations, and attend to their farm. Her German mother Ruth discounts her aspirations, disapproves of their exploitive nature, and orders that she complete chores while she lives in their home. This includes caring for her father who uses a wheelchair and is unable to speak. Though she initially sees the farm animals as her friends and converses with them as though they are human, she begins to take out her frustrations on them and begins slaughtering them to appease her inner rage.

Despite these restrictions, Pearl often sneaks away to the local movie theater where she can escape the cares of her day and fantasize her dreams of a future different from the life she's living. Over time, the projectionist at the moviehouse starts a flirtatious and lustful relationship with her. When he shows her the stag film A Free Ride, and tells her that he wants to see her in something similar one day, she once again begins to believe that one day she will be a star. Her thirst for sexual interaction continues to be suppressed as she attends the needs of the farm. All the while, her mother tells her that something is wrong with her, with outbursts of unacceptable psychopathic and sociopathic tendencies emerging. As their differences escalate, Pearl allows her true antisocial desires to release. As she commits to becoming a serial killer through murderous acts, she inadvertently seals her fate in order to avoid a criminal homicide investigation. She struggles to come to terms with the reality that she will never achieve her goals, never reach her dreams, and always have to remain anonymous at the family farm she inherits as a consequence of her actions.

=== MaXXXine (2024) ===
In March 2022, West announced that he was working on the script for a third film in the X series, to be set chronologically after the events of X. The project would explore another sub-genre of horror and would continue the depiction of cinema's influence on society, exploring how the development of home video releases did so. West states, while a viewer can watch each movie independently without seeing the previous film, they are made to "complement each other".

In June 2022, executive producer Peter Phok confirmed that a third film was officially in development with West attached to the project. In September 2022, at the first Midnight Madness showing of Pearl for the 2022 Toronto International Film Festival, a third film was officially announced with a short teaser played after the post-credits. The clip was later released online for those not present at the event. West once again would serve as writer/director and one of the producers, while Mia Goth would reprise her role from the first movie. Taking place in 1985 and titled MaXXXine, the plot was confirmed to center around Maxine, the only survivor of the "Massacre of X" as she continues to pursue her future in Hollywood. The teaser trailer was shot with the film fast-tracked to being green-lit by A24, following the successes of the previous two installments. Jacob Jaffke, Kevin Turen, and Harrison Kreiss were to be producers, while Goth would additionally serve as an executive producer.

In January 2023, Goth stated that the script was complete and that the story was, in her opinion, the best of the series so far. The actress stated that many of the previous production team were returning, with principal photography scheduled to commence later that year. In April 2023, it was announced that Elizabeth Debicki, Moses Sumney, Michelle Monaghan, Bobby Cannavale, Lily Collins, Halsey, Giancarlo Esposito, and Kevin Bacon had been added to the cast. Principal photography commenced later that month. The film was released on July 5, 2024.

=== Future ===
In March 2022, while describing his creative processes West stated: "I'm trying to build a world out of all this, like people do these days." He further expressed that: "You can't make a slasher movie without a bunch of sequels."

In February 2024, the filmmaker stated that he has plans for a fourth installment. The project's realization will depend on the reception of MaXXXine. In May of the same year, West confirmed that he is working on a fourth film; stating that he may develop it as his next project. In July of the same year, West stated that after completing the trilogy, he plans to determine whether the fourth movie or another story will be his next project, after first taking a short break from filmmaking. In August 2024, during a Reddit AMA, he stated that he is "happy with where [he] left it" and that MaXXXine is likely the end of the series.

== Development ==
Writer/director Ti West developed the film series as a study and analysis of mankind's desires for fame and fortune. Each movie will explore the associated horrors through a slightly different lens. X was created as a tribute to, and in the style of, the original installment of The Texas Chainsaw Massacre franchise. While it details the rise of independent filmmaking and its influence on society, the prequel film explored another style within the genre.

Filmed back-to-back with the first installment, Pearl was filmed as a secret prequel, with photography taking place in New Zealand. Once the announcement of the movie was made, it was already in the post-production stage. A sneak preview was also shown in X's post-credits scene for North American releases only. The filmmaker created the project with the intention of its being a mix between Douglas Sirk melodramas and Technicolor films, described as "a demented Disney movie". Exploring the rise of classic Hollywood film productions, West intended to detail its influences on societal shift and changes.

Likewise, the third installment, a direct sequel titled MaXXXine, was compared to giallo films (particularly by Dario Argento). The project explores the creation of home video, rentals, and video stores. Each installment is intended to portray human relations as a result of the media they consume.

== Cast and characters ==
List indicators

This section includes characters who will appear or have appeared in the franchise in main roles.

- An empty grey cell indicates the character was not in the film, or that the character's official presence has not yet been confirmed.
- ^{A} indicates an appearance through archival footage or audio.
- ^{C} indicates a cameo role.
- ^{P} indicates an appearance in onscreen photographs.
- ^{U} indicates an uncredited appearance.
- ^{V} indicates a voice-only role.
- ^{Y} indicates a younger version of the character.

Character	Films		
Character	X	Pearl	MaXXXine
Character	2022		2024
Maxine Minx	Mia Goth		Mia Goth Charley Rowan McCain^{Y}
Pearl Douglas	Mia Goth	Mia Goth	Mia Goth^{A} (Note: Goth portrays the character through flashback sequences, and during sequences where Maxine briefly envisions the character throughout the movie.)
Howard Douglas	Stephen Ure Larry Fessenden^{V}^{U} Alistair Sewell^{Y}^{P}	Alistair Sewell^{Y}	Mentioned
Lorraine Day	Jenna Ortega		Jenna Ortega^{P}
Wayne Gilroy	Martin Henderson		Mentioned
RJ Nichols	Owen Campbell		Mentioned
Bobby-Lynne Parker	Brittany Snow		Mentioned
Jackson Hollis	Scott "Kid Cudi" Mescudi		Mentioned
Ernest Miller The Televangelist	Simon Prast		Simon Prast
Sheriff Dentler	James Gaylyn		
The Projectionist		David Corenswet	
Ruth		Tandi Wright	
Pearl's father		Matthew Sunderland	
Mitsy Douglas		Emma Jenkins-Purro	
Margaret Douglas		Amelia Reid-Meredith	
Elizabeth "Liz" Bender			Elizabeth Debicki
Leon Green			Moses Sumney
Det. Williams			Michelle Monaghan
Det. Torres			Bobby Cannavale
Molly Bennett			Lily Collins
Tabby Martin			Halsey
Teddy Knight			Giancarlo Esposito
John Labat			Kevin Bacon
Amber James			Chloe Farnworth
FX Artist			Sophie Thatcher^{C}

== Additional crew and production details ==
Crew of X films
Film	Crew/Detail					
Film	Composer(s)	Cinematographer	Editor(s)	Production companies	Distributing company	Running time
X	Tyler Bates & Chelsea Wolfe	Eliot Rockett	Ti West & David Kashevaroff	A24; Mad Solar; Little Lamb Productions	A24	106 mins
Pearl	Tyler Bates & Tim Williams	Eliot Rockett	Ti West	A24; Mad Solar; Little Lamb Productions	A24	102 mins
MaXXXine	Tyler Bates	Eliot Rockett	Ti West	A24; Mad Solar; Little Lamb Productions	A24	104 mins

== Reception ==
=== Box office and financial performance ===
Commercial performance of X films
Film	Box office gross			Box office ranking		Video sales gross	Worldwide sales total	Budget	Ref(s)
Film	North America	Other territories	Worldwide	All-time domestic	All-time worldwide	North America	Worldwide sales total	Budget	Ref(s)
X	$11,769,469	$3,343,636	$15,113,105	#5,042	#6,322	$2,319,885	$17,432,990	$5,300,000	
Pearl	$9,423,445	$715,971	$10,139,416	#5,490	#7,597	$2,037,845	$12,177,261	$4,900,000	
MaXXXine	$15,082,039	$5,185,030	$20,267,069	#4,523	#5,531	TBD	TBD	$2,000,000	TBD
Totals	$36,274,953	$9,244,637	$45,519,590	#5,139	#7,892	$4,357,730	$29,610,251	$11,000,000	

=== Critical and public response ===
Critical performance of X films
Film	Rotten Tomatoes	Metacritic	CinemaScore
X	94% (229 reviews)	80/100 (35 reviews)	—N/a
Pearl	93% (215 reviews)	76/100 (39 reviews)	B−
MaXXXine	72% (284 reviews)	64/100 (50 reviews)	B
