= Boston Society of Film Critics Award for Best Cinematography =

Annual US film award

== Winners ==
=== 1980s ===
| Year | Winner | Cinematographer(s) |
|---|---|---|
| 1980 | Raging Bull | Michael Chapman |
| 1981 | Pennies from Heaven | Gordon Willis |
| 1982 | E.T. the Extra-Terrestrial | Allen Daviau |
| 1983 | Never Cry Wolf | Hiro Narita |
| 1984 | The Killing Fields | Chris Menges |
| 1985 | Ran | Takao Saitō and Shōji Ueda |
| 1986 | Blue Velvet | Frederick Elmes |
| 1987 | The Last Emperor | Vittorio Storaro |
| 1988 | The Unbearable Lightness of Being | Sven Nykvist |
| 1989 | The Fabulous Baker Boys | Michael Ballhaus |

=== 1990s ===
| Year | Winner | Cinematographer(s) |
|---|---|---|
| 1990 | No information | |
| 1991 | The Silence of the Lambs | Tak Fujimoto |
| 1992 | Unforgiven | Jack N. Green |
| 1993 | Schindler's List | Janusz Kamiński |
| 1994 | Ed Wood | Stefan Czapsky |
| 1995 | Safe | Alex Nepomniaschy |
| 1996 | The English Patient | John Seale |
| 1997 | Kundun | Roger Deakins |
| 1998 | Saving Private Ryan | Janusz Kamiński |
| 1999 | Sleepy Hollow | Emmanuel Lubezki |

=== 2000s ===
| Year | Winner | Cinematographer(s) |
|---|---|---|
| 2000 | Crouching Tiger, Hidden Dragon (Wo hu cang long) | Peter Pau |
| 2001 | The Man Who Wasn't There | Roger Deakins |
| 2002 | Far from Heaven | Edward Lachman |
| 2003 | Winged Migration (Le peuple migrateur) | Olli Barbé and 14 others |
| 2004 | House of Flying Daggers (Shi mian mai fu) | Zhao Xiaoding |
| 2005 | Good Night, and Good Luck | Robert Elswit |
| 2006 | Pan's Labyrinth (El Laberinto del fauno) | Guillermo Navarro |
| 2007 | The Diving Bell and the Butterfly (Le scaphandre et le papillon) | Janusz Kamiński |
| 2008 | Paranoid Park | Christopher Doyle and Rain Kathy Li |
| 2009 | The Hurt Locker | Barry Ackroyd |

=== 2010s ===
| Year | Winner | Cinematographer(s) |
|---|---|---|
| 2010 | True Grit | Roger Deakins |
| 2011 | The Tree of Life | Emmanuel Lubezki |
| 2012 | The Master | Mihai Mălaimare Jr. |
| 2013 | Gravity | Emmanuel Lubezki |
| 2014 | Birdman | Emmanuel Lubezki |
| 2015 | Carol | Edward Lachman |
| 2016 | The Handmaiden | Chung Chung-hoon |
| 2017 | Dunkirk | Hoyte van Hoytema |
| 2018 | Roma | Alfonso Cuaron |
| 2019 | Portrait of a Lady on Fire (Portrait de la jeune fille en feu) | Claire Mathon |

=== 2020s ===
| Year | Winner | Cinematographer(s) |
|---|---|---|
| 2020 | Nomadland | Joshua James Richards |
| 2021 | The Power of the Dog | Ari Wegner |
| 2022 | Pearl | Eliot Rockett |
| 2022 | X | Eliot Rockett |
| 2023 | The Taste of Things | Jonathan Ricquebourg |
| 2023 | Asteroid City | Robert Yeoman |
| 2023 | Poor Things | Robbie Ryan |
| 2024 | The Brutalist | Lol Crawley |
| 2025 | Sinners | Autumn Durald Arkapaw |
