= Kevin Turen =

American film and television producer (1979–2023)

- Publicity photo of Kevin Turen
- Born: August 16, 1979; New York City, U.S.
- Died: November 12, 2023 (aged 44); California, U.S.
- Education: Columbia University
- Occupations: Film and television producer
- Years active: 2005–2023
- Notable work: Euphoria; Arbitrage; X The Unbearable Weight of Massive Talent; Pieces of a Woman
- Spouse: Evelina Turen (m. 2012)
- Children: 2

Kevin Turen (August 16, 1979 – November 12, 2023) was an American film and television producer. His film credits included the X film series (2022–2024), Those Who Wish Me Dead (2021), The Unbearable Weight of Massive Talent (2022), Pieces of a Woman (2020), and Arbitrage (2012). His television work included Euphoria and The Idol, on which he served as an executive producer.

== Early life ==
Kevin Turen was born in New York City on August 16, 1979. He studied English and Cinema at Columbia University.

== Career ==
Turen was an executive at First Look Pictures, eventually becoming its president. In the 2010s, he worked at Infinity Media and Treehouse Films. In 2012, he developed and produced Nicholas Jarecki's acclaimed financial thriller Arbitrage, which was nominated for a Golden Globe Award for Best Actor for its star, Richard Gere. In 2014, he became the head of Phantom Four, a production company started by screenwriter David S. Goyer. During this time, Phantom Four worked on the film Assassination Nation (2018), written and directed by Sam Levinson. This began an extended collaboration with Levinson and his wife, Ashley; Turen co-founded Little Lamb Productions with them, and went on to produce the film Malcolm & Marie and work as an executive producer on the TV shows Euphoria and The Idol.

== Personal life ==
Turen married Evelina in June 2012, and they had two sons.

=== Death ===
On November 12, 2023, Turen was driving his Tesla vehicle on autopilot mode when he suffered a cardiac emergency. His son Jack was able to navigate the car to the side of the road and call 9-1-1; Turen was transported to a hospital, where he died at the age of 44. According to a report from a medical examiner, Turen died from acute cardiac dysfunction and hypertrophic cardiomyopathy, with coronary artery disease listed as a contributing factor. Hurry Up Tomorrow, one of his last films released posthumously, was dedicated to his memory.

== Filmography ==
Producer credits
Year	Title	Note
2005	Wassup Rockers	
2006	The Dead Girl	
2007	An American Crime	
2007	Smiley Face	
2010	Operation: Endgame	
2012	Arbitrage	
2012	At Any Price	
2013	All Is Lost	Executive producer
2014	That Awkward Moment	
2014	99 Homes	
2015	The Benefactor	
2015	Mediterranea	Executive producer
2016	The Birth of a Nation	
2018	Assassination Nation	
2018	Tau	
2018	A.X.L.	
2019	Villains	
2019-2022	Euphoria	Executive producer; 18 episodes
2019	Waves	
2020	The Last Days of American Crime	Executive producer
2020	Pieces of a Woman	
2021	Malcolm & Marie	
2021	North Hollywood	Executive producer
2021	Those Who Wish Me Dead	
2021	Antlers	Executive producer
2022	Breaking	
2022	Sharp Stick	
2022	The Unbearable Weight of Massive Talent	
2022	X	
2022	Irma Vep	Executive producer; 8 episodes
2022	Pearl	
2023	The Idol	Executive producer; 5 episodes
2024	MaXXXine	Posthumous release
2025	Hurry Up Tomorrow	Posthumous release
2026	Newborn	Posthumous release; executive producer
