= Gemma Booth =

English photographer

Gemma Booth (born 1974) is an English fashion and portrait photographer.

Born in Manchester, Booth studied graphic design at Manchester University. After graduation, she was a design assistant at the art magazine i-D and then became picture editor of The Face, where she remained until 2000, when she left to focus on her own work.

Booth has shot fashion spreads for Vogue UK, Vogue Girl Japan, Elle France, and Marie Claire. Her advertising clients have included Carhartt, Chanel, and Aerie. She has produced portraits of Natalie Press, Mia Goth, and Elsa Hosk. Her portraiture was featured in a 2005 exhibit at the National Portrait Gallery, London, and two of her portraits are in the Gallery's permanent collection.

Booth has also created a series of video clips located on her personal website as a part of a project for the "Next 'Nailed It'" T.V campaign. Her website states that her muse is her children and that she takes a lot of inspiration from the idea of "free children".

Booth has been lauded for her "dreamy and imaginative fashion stories."
