= Pearl (X) =

Fictional character from the X film series

- X character
- Mia Goth as Pearl in Pearl (2022)
- First appearance: X (2022)
- Last appearance: Pearl (2022, appearance); MaXXXine (2024, flashback)
- Created by: Ti West
- Portrayed by: Mia Goth

In-universe information
- Full name: Pearl Douglas
- Occupation: Farmer
- Spouse: Howard Douglas
- Relatives: Unnamed father; Ruth (mother); Mitsy Douglas (sister-in-law); Margaret Douglas (mother-in-law)
- Nationality: American

Pearl Douglas is a fictional character from the X film series, played by Mia Goth. Pearl first appears as the main character in X (2022) and returns as the misunderstood, young, troubled and vengeful woman who wishes for fame, and title character in its prequel, Pearl (2022). She is mentioned in the third film, MaXXXine (2024), and appears in flashback sequences. In X, Goth was cast as both Pearl and the final girl, Maxine. Director Ti West explained that this was to display the similarities between the two characters and admitted that a dual role for them was intended from the beginning, as he looked at them as "different characters but the same person". Goth commented that she gained many interpretations of Pearl's character throughout production, and felt sympathetic towards Pearl in X. The actress noted she preferred to think of her character as neither a villain nor a victim.

Having enjoyed several discussions about the character, and believing she would be the "stand-out" of X, Goth and West wrote a prequel to the film. The prequel, later titled Pearl after the character, was written to take place during World War I and the Spanish flu pandemic. It was filmed immediately after X and Goth reprised her role as Pearl. The film set to focus on how Pearl's background led to her becoming a killer without making attempts to excuse her behavior. Goth characterized the younger Pearl as "a dreamer" and "an emotional person who wears her heart on her sleeve and is quite sensitive". Goth's performances in both films received universal critical acclaim as critics agreed that her varied and committed portrayal was a highlight of the film series. Similarly, critics sang praises of Pearl's characterization throughout the franchise, with the character being deemed a modern-day example of a "horror icon".

== Appearances ==
Pearl made her original appearance in X. In the film, which is set in 1979 Texas, Pearl and her husband, Howard (Stephen Ure), are an elderly couple living on a farm. Due to his age and heart condition, Howard is unable to have sex despite Pearl's attempts to seduce him. When a group of young filmmakers begin shooting a pornographic film on the farm, Pearl grows envious of their youth, motivating herself and Howard to kill all of them except one actress, Maxine (Goth), whom Pearl becomes infatuated with. After Pearl eventually persuades Howard to have sex with her, he begins dying of a heart attack before Maxine appears and threatens to shoot them with an unloaded pistol. Pearl tries shooting her with Howard's gun in response, but the recoil knocks her back onto the porch and she breaks her hip. This allows Maxine the time to enter Howard's truck, reverse it to crush Pearl's head, and flee.

The character returned in the prequel, Pearl. Set in 1918, the film showcases Pearl in her twenties. Pearl lives on her family's homestead with her paralyzed father (Matthew Sunderland) and stern German mother, Ruth (Tandi Wright), while her husband Howard (Alistair Sewell) serves in the First World War. Although she is smitten with the concept of stardom and dreams of being a famous dancer, Pearl shows signs of psychopathy as she kills farm animals and physically abuses her father. When her sister-in-law, Mitsy (Emma Jenkins-Purro), tells her about an audition to discover dancers for a traveling troupe, Pearl sees an opportunity to escape her life. When Ruth learns of her daughter's plans, Pearl kills her, her father, and a projectionist (David Corenswet) before leaving to attend the audition. After she is rejected, Pearl goes into a lengthy confession to Mitsy regarding her resentment towards Howard, having an affair, her psychopathic tendencies, her miscarriage, and killing animals, her parents and the projectionist. Pearl then intimidates a stunned Mitsy into confessing that she won the audition before killing her with an axe. When Howard returns from the war and sees the corpses of her victims Pearl has arranged at the dinner table, she greets him with a pained smile.

In the third film, MaXXXine, set in 1985, Pearl appears through flashback sequences and during sequences where Maxine briefly envisions the character. In this film, her surname is also revealed to be Douglas by private investigator John Labat (Kevin Bacon).

== Development ==
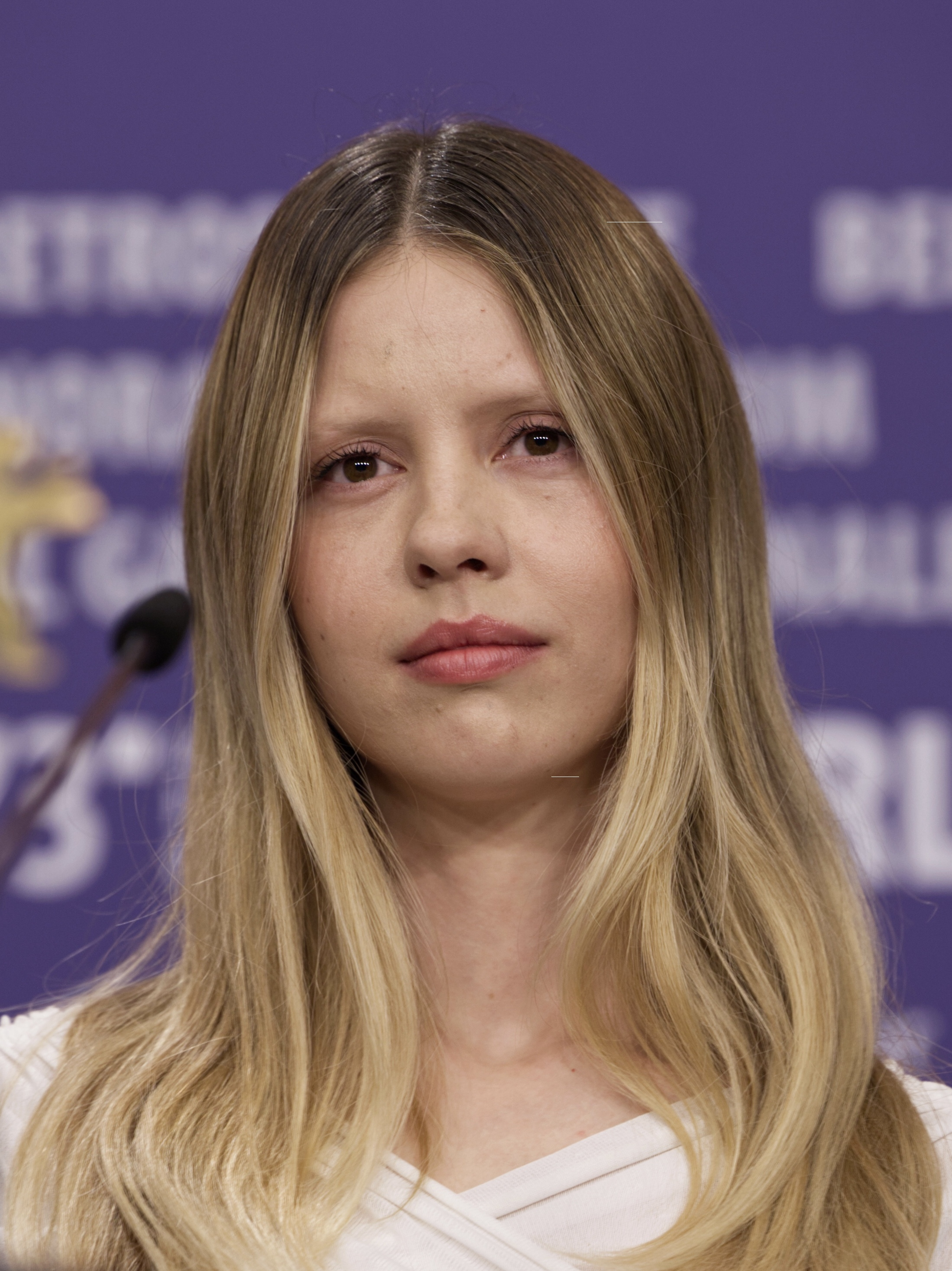
Mia Goth (pictured) plays both Pearl and Maxine in X. The dual casting was employed by director Ti West to emphasize the similarities between the characters.

In X, Mia Goth was cast as both the elderly antagonist, Pearl, and the final girl, Maxine Minx, making her the sole actress given a dual role in the film. Director Ti West explained that this choice was incorporated to display the similarities between the two characters. As a theme in X was the juxtaposition between age and sexual liberation, Pearl was therefore intended to act as a prediction of Maxine's future. Goth initially did not know that she was being cast to play both Pearl and Maxine, explaining that she expressed both shock and intrigue upon learning the news. West admitted that he intended from the beginning for the two characters to share an actress, as he "always thought of them as different characters but the same person". He also believed that the dual casting would help X stand out among other slasher films. Goth detailed that she and West spoke "at length" for months about Pearl's connection to Maxine, as, in her words: "they carry the same essence and they're just at different life stages ... but their spirit is the same". She added that she and West were particularly interested in the desires and fears of the characters.

Playing two characters presented challenges for Goth. It took over eight hours to fully apply the prosthetic makeup for Pearl. On set, Goth would alternate days where she filmed scenes as Maxine and Pearl. Goth enjoyed filming scenes in which she appears as both Maxine and Pearl, commenting that doing so gave her ample opportunity to "go inward" on her characters and create whatever impression was desired. The actress said reading the film's script multiple times gave her many interpretations of Pearl's character, adding that doing so not only helped her envision her humanity and complexity, but also to generate many ideas for her portrayal. Goth proclaimed she felt "a lot of sympathy" for Pearl, which she found important as it resulted in Pearl not being presented as a trope or a stereotypical monster, commenting that it helped the role become more interesting. She added that she never envisioned Pearl as a villain or a victim, preferring to think Pearl "saw something in Maxine" that sparked her long-suppressed murderous instinct. The actress initially struggled juggling playing two characters and giving each of them an equal amount of thought.

Goth and West often speculated Pearl's backstory together during the production of X, with the lengthy discussions leading to the idea to create a prequel focused on her. Before filming for X concluded, the two began writing the prequel, Pearl, to focus on Pearl, as they believed that the character would be "the stand-out" of X. West convinced the studio, A24, to allow the films to be filmed back-to-back. Goth was scheduled to return to the part of Pearl in addition to contributing to the film's script. Pearl became the first film Goth had written for. The prequel was written to focus on Pearl as a young woman during World War I and how her backstory led to her becoming a killer, without making attempts to justify her actions. Goth explained that Pearl being filmed so soon after X helped her imagine a younger version of her character because she was familiar with the cast and set. She also added that she could easily recall X and her previous portrayal, which she utilized to characterize the younger Pearl. She explained: "Stepping onto [the setting] for the first time after they had redressed everything just made me feel very confident, as though all my ideas and what I was doing with Pearl was going to fit perfectly into this world. Had I stepped onto that set and it wasn't as enhanced and as vibrant as it had been, I might have felt a little insecure as to what it was that I wanted to do".

Goth was grateful to be able to reprise the role of Pearl and characterized her in the prequel as "a dreamer" and "an emotional person who wears her heart on her sleeve and is quite sensitive", to which she opined: "to have a character like that to sink your teeth into was so rich". While developing Pearl's beliefs and personality for the prequel, Goth found herself relating intimately to "the ways her character sees movies as a path to a better life". Goth admired how Pearl had a "complex inner landscape", noting that she wasn't sure how she approached her performance, attributing it to a strong understanding of her character. West admired Goth's ability to "create a villain character that wasn't ... a normal villain", as well as how she brought "humanity" to Pearl, noting that the movie depended on it. Goth commented that she was originally nervous to shoot the scene where Pearl confesses to her murders and mental discomfort as it was a lengthy, one-take scene. She practiced it every night as preparation, and they shot it on the last day of filming to allow Goth to put in perspective all the "emotional turmoil" Pearl had undergone.

== Reception and legacy ==
Goth's performance as Pearl received universal critical acclaim. Danielle Ryan of Slashfilm commented that Goth portrayed Pearl as "both unhinged and relatable". Clarisse Loughrey of The Independent praised how Goth's performance made Pearl's behavior believable, particularly describing "her commitment to every choked cry for attention", and "glassy-eyed departure from reality" as "unimpeachable". Ana Peres of MovieWeb ranked Goth's performances in X and Pearl as the best horror film performances of 2022, writing that the actress "blew everyone's mind" and called both performances "striking", further commending her for giving life to the character with her "perfect sensibility and vulnerability". In a review of Pearl, Ryan Gilbey of The New Statesman wrote that Goth's performance was a highlight of the film. Damon Wise of Deadline praised Goth's acting, calling her a "powerhouse" who prevented the character from becoming one-dimensional. Harry Guerin of RTÉ appreciated Goth's variation in the role, detailing: "Goth switches gears between childlike, alluring and terrifying". Jen Yamato of The Los Angeles Times also praised the layers in Goth's portrayal, writing that she "unleashes a monster layered with complexity, vulnerability, humanity and rage". David Caballero of Collider wrote that Goth delivered "a tour-de-force portrayal of desperation, frustration and melancholy", deeming it "Oscar-worthy". After the actress didn't receive any Oscar nominations for the role, Angelo Delos Trinos of CBR listed Goth as one of ten actors snubbed by the award ceremony, writing that it "solidified [Goth's] place as one of the best new actors working in the horror genre today".

The character of Pearl was also positively received by critics. Clark Collins of Entertainment Weekly deemed the character of Pearl one of the "greatest horror roles" of 2022. Loughrey (The Independent) declared Pearl to be a "brand new horror icon". Delos Trinos (CBR) called Pearl "an iconic tragic monster" and a "hauntingly tragic figure". Alison Foreman of IndieWire ranked Pearl as the sixth-scariest female horror villain, naming Pearl's monologue as her most frightening scene as it "ferociously picks apart [her] psyche". Yamato (The Los Angeles Times) considered Pearl to be a "richly dynamic role", adding that the character's monologue was one "for the ages". Wendy Ide of The Guardian praised Pearl's character, writing that it was "filled with kittenish cruelty and the creeping rot of madness, all topped off with a monstrous, distorting need to be loved". Sofia Torres of The Heights named Pearl a "brilliantly complex" character, writing: "In a way, Pearl's self awareness and, sometimes, her remorse humanizes her character". Nicholas Johnson of MovieWeb called Pearl "one of the more recent additions to the canon of terrifying horror film serial killers" and one of the "most compelling film characters in recent memory".

A scene from Pearl where the character yells "I'm a star" became a popular meme on social media after its release. Inde Navarrette credited Goth's performance in Pearl as an inspiration for her performance as Nikki in Obsession (2025).
