= Mia Goth =

British actress (born 1993)

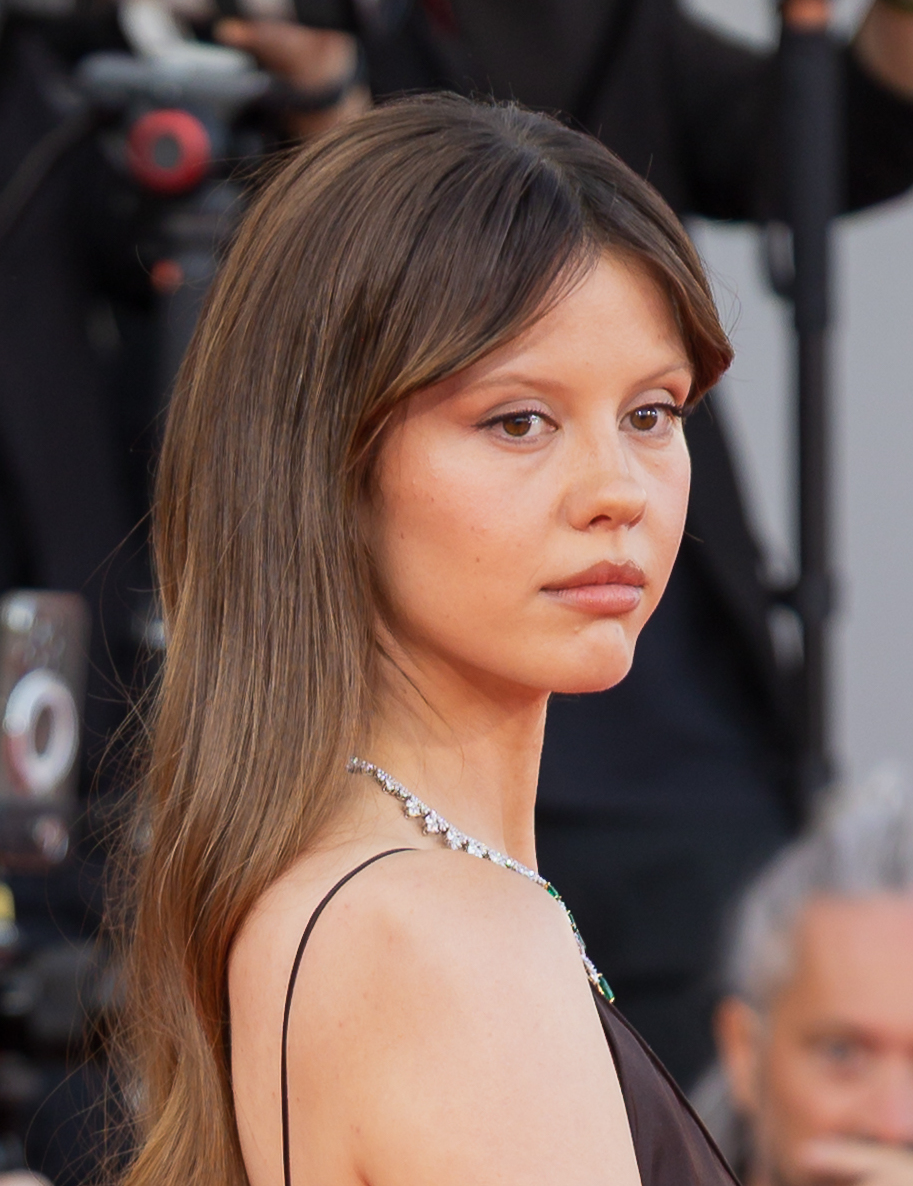
- Goth in 2025
- Born: Mia Gypsy Mello da Silva Goth; 25 October 1993 (age 32); London, England
- Occupations: Actress; model
- Years active: 2007–present
- Children: 1
- Relatives: Lee Jaffe (grandfather); Maria Gladys (grandmother)

Mia Gypsy Mello da Silva Goth (born 25 October 1993) is a British actress and model. After modelling as a teenager, Goth made her acting debut in the erotic drama Nymphomaniac (2013). She earned recognition with the films A Cure for Wellness (2016), High Life (2018), Suspiria (2018), and Emma (2020). She achieved a career breakthrough by playing Maxine Minx and Pearl in the X film series (2022–2024) which established her as a scream queen. She has since starred in Infinity Pool (2023) and Frankenstein (2025) and will star in Star Wars: Starfighter (2027).

== Early life and education ==
Mia Gypsy Mello da Silva Goth was born on 25 October 1993 in Guy's Hospital in London. Her mother is Brazilian and her father is Canadian, originally from Nova Scotia. Her maternal grandfather is American artist Lee Jaffe, and her maternal grandmother is Brazilian actress Maria Gladys. Goth moved to Brazil when she was two weeks old, because her mother, who was 20 at the time, needed help from her family to raise her. They returned to the United Kingdom when she was five and briefly relocated to her father's native Canada when she was 10. Goth said that the period when they tried living with her father was very difficult.

In Canada, Goth attended nine schools in a single school year. When she was 12, she and her mother settled in southeast London, where she grew up and attended Sydenham School. Goth's mother raised her in a single-parent household, working as a waitress to support them.

== Career ==
=== 2007–2021: Early modelling and acting ===
At the age of 13, she was discovered at the 2007 Underage Festival in London by fashion photographer Gemma Booth, who signed her to Storm Model Management. She subsequently appeared in advertising campaigns for Miu Miu and Prada, was featured in the Pirelli Calendar, and appeared in the magazines Wonderland, Vogue, Vogue Italia, W, Love, Dazed, Interview, AnOther, British Vogue, Document Journal and Glamour. Goth made her runway debut in 2023, opening the Miu Miu F/W 23 Show.

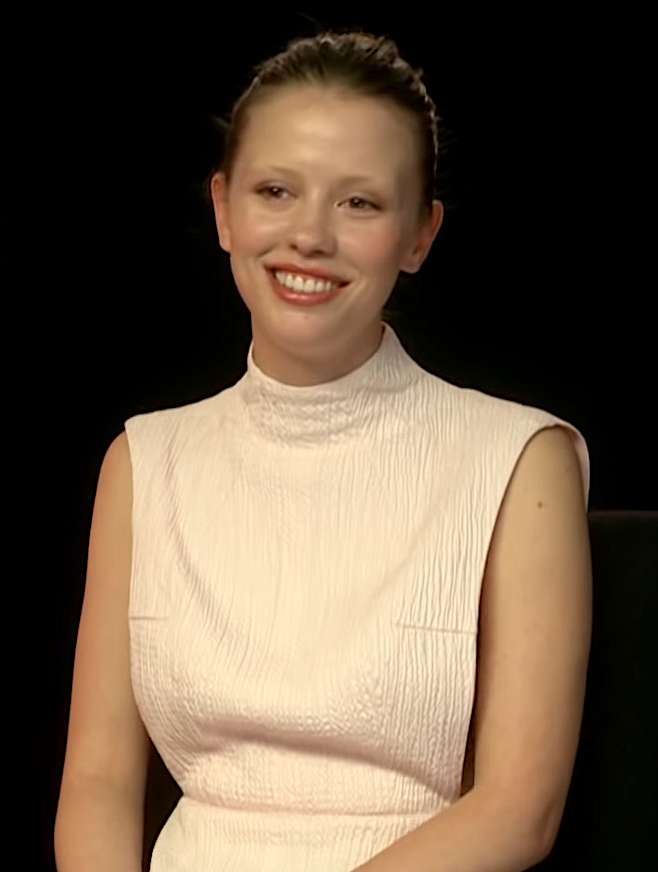
Goth in 2018

Goth began to audition for films at 15, and after finishing sixth form, won her first role in Lars von Trier's Nymphomaniac (2013), appearing alongside Charlotte Gainsbourg and Willem Dafoe in the segment "The Gun". In 2013, Goth played Sophie Campbell in three episodes of Sky Atlantic's crime drama series The Tunnel and appeared in Future Unlimited's music video for "Haunted Love", directed by Shia LaBeouf.

In 2014, she appeared in the Stephen Fingleton directed introductory short film Magpie with Martin McCann. In 2015, Goth played the lead role of Milja in the post-apocalyptic thriller The Survivalist directed by Fingleton, followed by roles as Meg Weathers in the disaster adventure-thriller film Everest directed by Baltasar Kormákur, and Hanna Helmqvist in a 2016 episode of BBC One's crime series Wallander.

Goth appeared in the horror film A Cure for Wellness (2016) directed by Gore Verbinski and had supporting roles in Luca Guadagnino's 2018 remake of Suspiria (1977) and the sci-fi mystery film High Life (2018) directed by Claire Denis. Goth appeared in Guadagnino's short film The Staggering Girl (2019) and Autumn de Wilde's period romantic comedy film Emma (2020). She also starred in Karen Cinorre's action drama film Mayday (2021) with Grace Van Patten and Juliette Lewis.

=== 2022–present: Breakthrough with the X film series ===
Goth starred in Ti West's slasher film X, released in March 2022 to critical acclaim. Goth donned extensive prosthetic makeup to portray the elderly Pearl. Describing her experience, Goth stated, "It was a good 10 hours in the makeup chair, and then I'd go and do a 12-hour day on set, and the makeup artist, Sarah Rubano, who was incredible, would constantly be touching me up and making sure my contacts were all right and all those sorts of things." She received praise for her roles as both protagonist Maxine Minx and antagonist Pearl, with West stating, "She understood the characters really well, and she understood the duality of Maxine and Pearl." David Sims of The Atlantic wrote "The dual showcase is a remarkable one for Goth, who previously stood out in supporting roles in Emma, High Life, and A Cure for Wellness". She subsequently starred in the prequel film Pearl, which she co-wrote with West and began filming immediately after X. The film was released in September 2022 to positive reviews. Goth's performance in the film received praise, and is considered to be one of the best film performances of its year. For her portrayal of the character, she was nominated for an Independent Spirit Award for Best Lead Performance, among other awards. In these roles she gained notoriety within the horror community and has been highlighted as a modern scream queen.

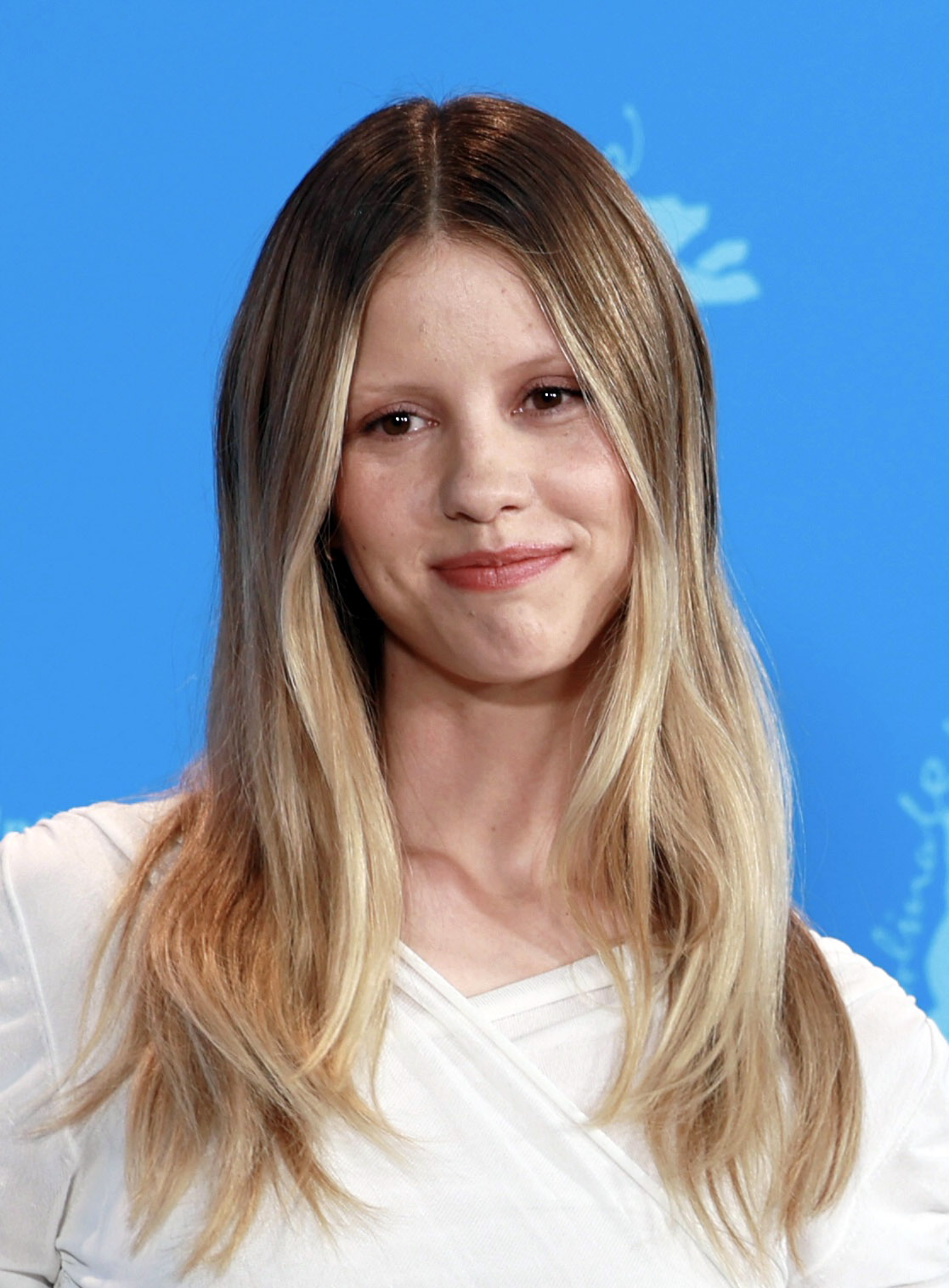
Goth in 2023

Goth next starred in Brandon Cronenberg's body horror Infinity Pool opposite Alexander Skarsgård. The film premiered at the 2023 Sundance Film Festival to positive critical reception, with her performance receiving praise. David Fear of Rolling Stone wrote "Goth makes an even stronger post-Pearl case for her being the single most interesting actor working in genre movies at the moment" and Meagan Navarro of Bloody Disgusting concluded "Goth progresses her character's devious machinations with a scene-stealing level of unhinged glee that might give Pearl a run for her money".

Goth reprised the role of Maxine Minx in MaXXXine, the third film in the X series, which was released in 2024. Goth felt that the script was the best of the series so far. Jeannette Catsoulis of The New York Times praised the film and coined Goth's performance "as usual, sublime". In contrast, Christy Lemire of RogerEbert.com was critical of the film and Maxine Minx's characterisation, who believed that Goth "remains a singular screen presence, but she can only do so much with a character who becomes less interesting as she finds herself drawn deeper into danger."

Goth starred in Guillermo del Toro's horror film Frankenstein (2025) as Victor Frankenstein's love interest, Elizabeth Harlander. Goth also played young Victor's mother in the early flashback scenes of the film. In 2026, she appeared in Christopher Nolan's The Odyssey as Melantho. In 2027, she will star in Shawn Levy's film Star Wars: Starfighter as the main antagonist.

== Personal life ==
Goth speaks English, Portuguese, and Spanish. She met American actor Shia LaBeouf on the set of Nymphomaniac in 2012. On 10 October 2016, Goth and LaBeouf appeared to get married in a Las Vegas ceremony officiated by an Elvis impersonator. Two days later, a local official revealed that the pair were not legally married, but instead a commitment ceremony was performed. Later that month, LaBeouf confirmed their nuptials on The Ellen DeGeneres Show. In September 2018, it was announced the couple had separated and filed for divorce. In February 2022, it was reported that the couple had reconciled and Goth was pregnant with their first child. Their daughter was born in March 2022. Their relationship ended in July 2025. Goth filed for divorce in October 2026, citing irreconcilable differences.

== Filmography ==
=== Film ===
Key
†	Denotes films that have not yet been released

Year	Title	Role	Notes	Ref.
2013	Nymphomaniac	P	Segment: "The Gun"	
2014	Magpie	The Girl	Short film	
2015	The Survivalist	Milja		
2015	Everest	Meg Weathers		
2016	A Cure for Wellness	Hannah von Reichmerl		
2017	Marrowbone	Jane Marrowbone		
2018	Suspiria	Sara Simms		
2018	High Life	Boyse		
2019	The Staggering Girl	Young Sofia Moretti	Short film	
2020	Emma	Harriet Smith		
2021	Mayday	Marsha		
2022	X	Maxine Minx / Pearl Douglas		
2022	Pearl	Pearl Douglas	Also writer & executive producer	
2023	Infinity Pool	Gabi Bauer		
2024	MaXXXine	Maxine Minx	Also producer	
2025	Frankenstein	Elizabeth Harlander / Claire Frankenstein		
2026	The Odyssey	Melantho		
2027	Star Wars: Starfighter †	TBA	Post-production	
TBA	Fonda †	TBA	Post-production	

=== Television ===
Year	Title	Role	Notes	Ref.
2013	The Tunnel	Sophie Campbell	Recurring role; 3 episodes (series 1)	
2016	Wallander	Hanna Helmqvist	Episode: "A Lesson in Love"	
2022	The House	Mabel	Television special; Voice role; Segment: "I – And heard within, a lie is spun"	

=== Music videos ===
Year	Song	Artist	Ref.
2013	"Haunted Love"	Future Unlimited	

== Awards and nominations ==
List of awards and nominations received by Mia Goth
Award	Year (Note: Indicates the year of ceremony. Each year is linked to the article about the awards held that year, wherever possible.)	Category	Nominated work	Result	Ref.
AACTA International Awards	2026	Best Supporting Actress	Frankenstein	Nominated	
Actor Awards	2026	Outstanding Performance by a Cast in a Motion Picture	Frankenstein	Nominated	
Austin Film Critics Association Awards	2023	Best Actress	Pearl	Nominated	
Bram Stoker Awards	2022	Superior Achievement in a Screenplay	Pearl	Nominated	
Canadian Screen Awards	2024	Best Lead Performance in a Drama Film	Infinity Pool	Nominated	
Chicago Film Critics Association Awards	2022	Best Actress	Pearl	Nominated	
Critics' Choice Super Awards	2023	Best Actress in a Horror Movie	Pearl	Won	
Critics' Choice Super Awards	2023	Best Villain in a Movie	Pearl	Won	
Critics' Choice Super Awards	2024	Best Actress in a Horror Movie	Infinity Pool	Nominated	
Dorian Awards	2023	Film Performance of the Year	Pearl	Nominated	
Hollywood Critics Association Midseason Awards	2022	Best Actress	X	Nominated	
Hollywood Critics Association Midseason Awards	2023	Best Actress	Infinity Pool	Nominated	
Independent Spirit Awards	2023	Best Lead Performance	Pearl	Nominated	
MTV Movie + TV Awards	2022	Most Frightened Performance	X	Nominated	
Online Film Critics Society Awards	2023	Best Actress	Pearl	Nominated	
San Francisco Bay Area Film Critics Circle Awards	2023	Best Actress	Pearl	Nominated	
Saturn Awards	2024	Best Actress	Pearl	Nominated	
Saturn Awards	2024	Best Writing	Pearl	Nominated	
Seattle Film Critics Society Awards	2023	Best Actress in a Leading Role	Pearl	Nominated	
Seattle Film Critics Society Awards	2023	Villain of the Year	X / Pearl	Nominated	
Seattle Film Critics Society Awards	2024	Villain of the Year	Infinity Pool	Nominated	
Sitges Film Festival	2022	Best Actress	Pearl	Won	
St. Louis Film Critics Association	2022	Best Actress	Pearl	Nominated	
Vancouver Film Critics Circle	2024	Best Supporting Female Actor in a Canadian Film	Infinity Pool	Nominated	

https://people.com/mia-goth-files-for-divorce-from-shia-labeouf-after-separation-12163156|marriage}}</ref>
