= Pearl (2022 film) =

American film by Ti West

- Theatrical release poster
- Directed by: Ti West
- Written by: Ti West; Mia Goth
- Based on: Characters by Ti West
- Produced by: Jacob Jaffke; Ti West; Kevin Turen; Harrison Kreiss
- Starring: Mia Goth; David Corenswet; Tandi Wright; Matthew Sunderland; Emma Jenkins-Purro
- Cinematography: Eliot Rockett
- Edited by: Ti West
- Music by: Tyler Bates; Tim Williams
- Production companies: A24; Little Lamb; Mad Solar Productions
- Distributed by: A24 (United States); Universal Pictures (international)
- Release dates: September 3, 2022 (Venice); September 16, 2022 (United States)
- Running time: 102 minutes
- Country: United States
- Language: English
- Box office: $10.1 million

Pearl is a 2022 American psychological slasher film directed, produced, and edited by Ti West, who co-wrote the screenplay with Mia Goth. It is the second installment in West's X film series and a prequel to X (2022). Goth reprises her role as the title character, with a supporting cast featuring David Corenswet, Tandi Wright, Matthew Sunderland, and Emma Jenkins-Purro. The film serves as an origin story for the titular villain, whose fervent aspiration to become a movie star clashes with her home life and violent tendencies, leading to violent acts on her family's Texas homestead in 1918.

West began co-writing a prequel script stemming from his collaboration with Goth while filming X. Motivated by the impact of the COVID-19 pandemic on cinema, filming started in New Zealand immediately after the first film, using X sets and the Avatar: The Way of Water crew and taking pandemic safety precautions. Pearl drew inspiration from the works of Douglas Sirk, Technicolor films like The Wizard of Oz (1939) and Mary Poppins (1964), and Disney films. It had its world premiere at the 79th Venice International Film Festival on September 3, 2022, and was released in theaters in the United States on September 16, 2022, by A24. The film grossed over $10 million and received positive reviews from critics, with particular praise going to Goth's performance.

MaXXXine, a third film in the series and a direct sequel to X, was released on July 5, 2024. Goth reprised her other role from the first film.

== Plot ==
In 1918, Pearl is a young woman living with her German immigrant parents on their farm in Texas, while her husband, Howard, serves in World War I. Her father is infirm and paralyzed, and her strict mother, Ruth, insists that she help care for both him and the farm as they isolate themselves to protect against the Spanish flu pandemic. Ruth disapproves of Pearl's aspiration to be a chorus girl or a film star. Pearl shows signs of repressed rage and violence, chafing at living in isolation. She abuses her father in secret and kills animals, which she feeds to an alligator she nicknamed Theda.

Pearl meets a projectionist in town who takes a liking to her, returns to the farm, and dances with a scarecrow before having sex with it. Ruth berates Pearl and withholds her food, as Pearl claimed to have bought sweets on the way home to explain the missing 8 cents she spent on a movie ticket.

Pearl learns from her wealthy sister-in-law Mitsy about an audition across the state for a dance troupe. The projectionist shows her the forbidden stag film A Free Ride and urges her to chase her dreams. Pearl feels she can't leave her family and wishes them dead. At dinner, Ruth reveals she knows about Pearl's visits to the movies. Pearl asks permission to audition and Ruth declares Pearl to be her biggest failure. The argument turns physical and Pearl shoves her mother against the hearth, causing her dress to catch fire. Pearl douses the dress with boiling water and drags Ruth into the basement. Leaving her father alone, she flees to the theater, where she has sex with the projectionist.

The projectionist drives Pearl home the next day, disturbed by her unexpectedly agitated behavior and the sight of a rotting pig Pearl's mother-in-law left several days before. Pearl stops him from leaving by stabbing him to death with a pitchfork. She pushes his car into a pond, where Theda eats his remains. Pearl dresses herself in one of Ruth's Belle Époque gowns and dresses her father in his best clothes before smothering him with a pillow cover.

Pearl arrives at the audition thinking her dance performance will impress the talent scouts. She is rejected instead for not being young, blonde, or "all-American". Mitsy accompanies her home to console her, and Pearl confesses resentment of her husband, having an affair, killing animals, and murdering her parents and the projectionist. Pearl then coerces a stunned Mitsy into confessing that she won the audition. When Mitsy tries to leave, Pearl chases her down the driveway and kills her with an axe. Pearl dismembers the body and feeds the remains to Theda, then goes into the basement and lies next to Ruth's corpse. She decides to atone for her crimes by creating a home for Howard. Some time later, Howard returns and is greeted with the long-decomposed bodies of Pearl's parents seated at the dining table around the rotting feast. As Howard stares in horror, Pearl greets him with a protracted, pained smile, saying, "I'm so happy you're home."

== Cast ==
- Mia Goth as Pearl
- David Corenswet as the projectionist
- Tandi Wright as Ruth, Pearl's mother
- Matthew Sunderland as Pearl's father
- Emma Jenkins-Purro as Mitsy, Howard's sister
- Amelia Reid-Meredith as Margaret, Howard and Mitsy's mother
- Alistair Sewell as Howard, Pearl's husband

== Production ==
=== Development ===
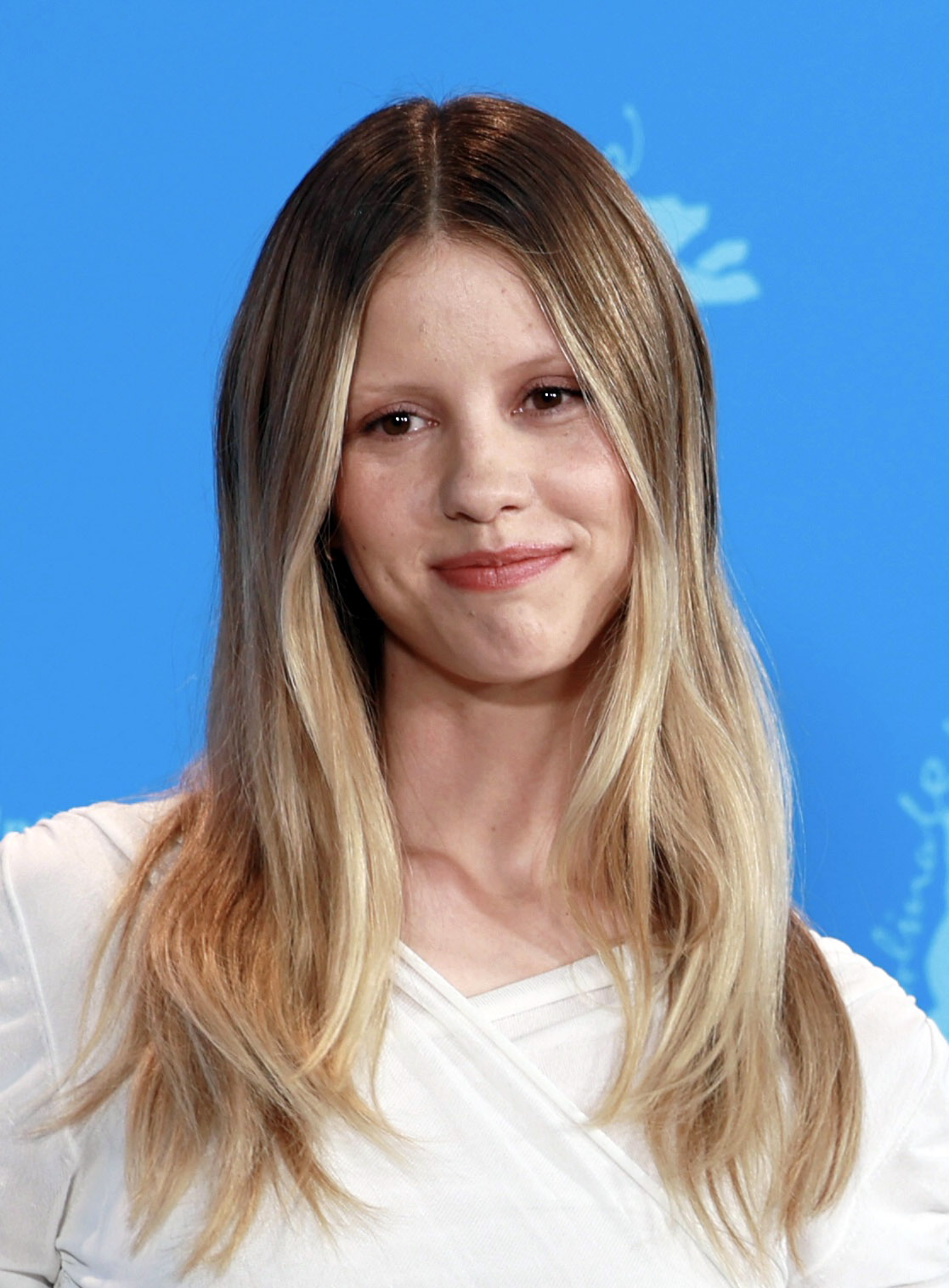
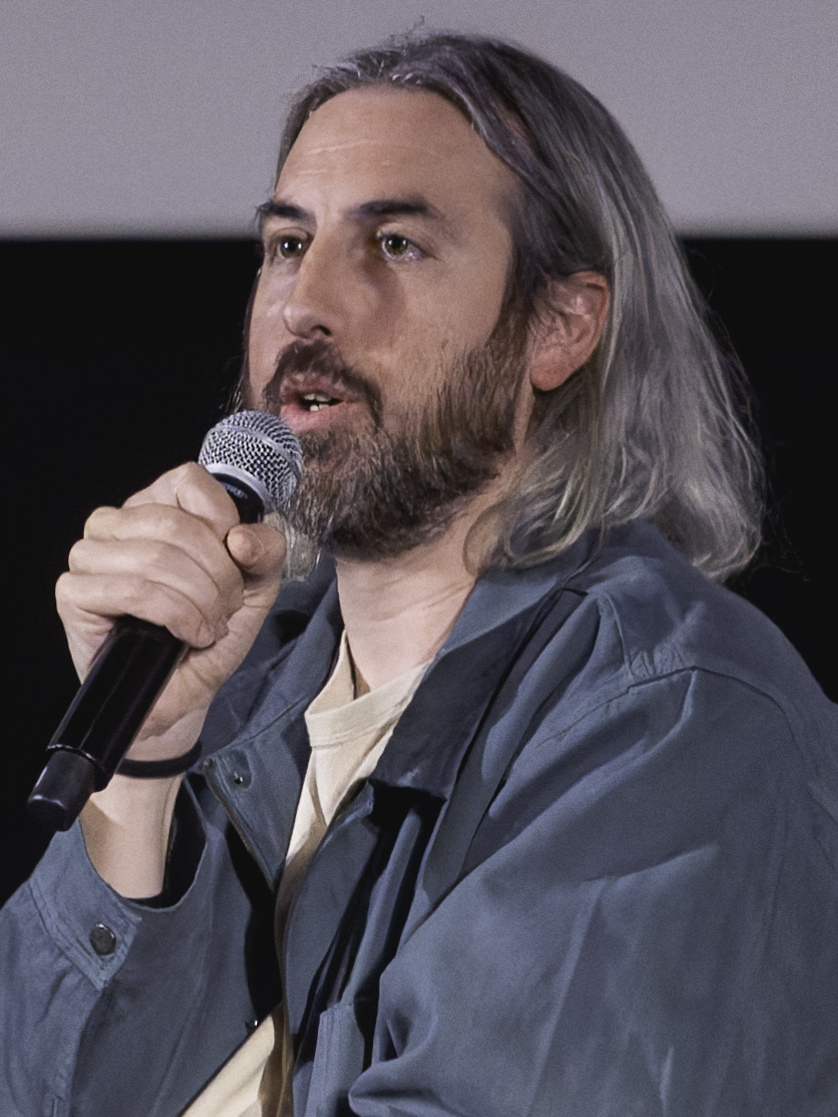
Along with starring in the title role, Mia Goth co-wrote Pearl with its director Ti West (right).

Ti West began writing a script for the prequel film during production on X. He stated that the prequel project had developed from a story he had collaborated on with Mia Goth, and that he had seen it either as becoming a potential film, or simply serving as a backstory for Goth's role as Pearl in the first movie. After the onset of the coronavirus pandemic, seeing its impact on the cinema industry, West stated that he had been inspired to continue working and had decided to begin production of the prequel immediately after wrapping on the previous installment. West stated that he had pitched his idea of a new franchise to A24 and had been surprised when they green-lit his projects. The filmmaker stated that he intends each film to have its own distinct style and genre of horror. Describing his approach to X, he said he was heavily influenced by The Texas Chainsaw Massacre franchise and by the works of Mario Bava, which explore how the rise of independent filmmaking affected society. Regarding Pearl, he described it as Douglas Sirk melodrama meeting the Technicolor style of Mary Poppins and The Wizard of Oz, made as a "demented Disney movie", and said it will explore how Hollywood filmmaking has influenced people. West stated that he intends to continue this trend of exploring diverse styles and genres in future installments. The movie is a joint-venture production between A24 and Little Lamb Productions.

=== Casting ===
Mia Goth reprises her role as a younger version of Pearl, the elderly woman from the first film. In July 2022, it was revealed that David Corenswet, Tandi Wright, Matthew Sunderland, and Emma Jenkins-Purro would feature as the supporting cast.

=== Filming ===
Principal photography was revealed to have begun in secret immediately following the completed photography on X. Filming started in New Zealand, took place back-to-back with the first movie and used the same sets that were built for X. West worked with the production crew of Avatar: The Way of Water (2022), who were taking a break from production on that film at the time. West stated that, despite the production taking place during the COVID-19 pandemic, the production crew had already completed their required period of self-isolation, and were therefore able to work safely and efficiently together during the pandemic. He said: "I came out of quarantine and I was like, 'We're already building all of this stuff, it's COVID and we're on the one place on Earth where it's safe to make a movie.'"

=== Post-production ===
In March 2022, having completed filming, West announced that he was currently working on editing the movie, that he would go to Nashville, Tennessee, following the March 2022 SXSW Film Festival, to record the orchestral score for the soundtrack with Tyler Bates and Timothy Williams, and that the film was expected to be finished in May.

== Music ==
The film score was released through A24 Music on September 23, 2022. Bates and Williams shared a liking of film scores from the classical Hollywood cinema mostly from Bernard Herrmann, John Barry, Henry Mancini, Ennio Morricone and Maurice Jarre. In contrast to X, the duo wanted to produce a stylistically classical approach from that period, so that people could conceive it as a classic film over a slasher-horror film.

After Chelsea Wolfe's cover of "Oui, Oui, Marie" appeared in X and on its accompanying soundtrack, Pearl features the original, Arthur Fields' version of the song as diegetic music when Pearl goes to see Palace Follies. Pearl also makes a reference to the song when she exclaims "Au revoir, poor Johnny!" after pushing the projectionist's car into the pond.

== Release ==
Pearl had its world premiere at the 79th Venice International Film Festival on September 3, 2022, and was released in theaters in the United States on September 16, 2022.

=== Home media ===
The film was released on VOD on October 25, 2022, and was released on Blu-ray and DVD on November 15, 2022.

== Reception ==
=== Box office ===
In the United States and Canada, Pearl was released alongside The Woman King and See How They Run, and was projected to gross around $4 million from 2,900 theaters in its opening weekend. The film made $1.3 million on its first day and went on to debut to $3.1 million, finishing third at the box office. It made $1.92 million in its second weekend, finishing fifth at the box office.

=== Critical response ===
On Rotten Tomatoes, the film holds an approval rating of 93% based on 218 reviews, with an average rating of 7.8/10. The site's consensus states: "Pearl finds Ti West squeezing fresh gore out of the world he created with X – and once again benefiting from a brilliant Mia Goth performance." On Metacritic, the film has a weighted average score of 76 out of 100 based on reviews from 39 critics, indicating "generally favorable reviews". Audiences polled by CinemaScore gave the film an average grade of "B–" on an A+ to F scale, while those at PostTrak gave the film a 75% overall positive score, with 54% saying they would definitely recommend it.

Reviewing the film following its Venice Film Festival premiere, Peter Bradshaw of The Guardian praised West's direction and Goth's "grandiose performance", assigning it a perfect rating of five stars and remarking: "Perhaps I shouldn't have enjoyed Pearl as much as I did: but it's clever, limber, gruesome and brutally well acted. A gem." In his review for The Hollywood Reporter, David Rooney described it as a "cleverly packaged pandemic production with narrative echoes of that global anxiety", praising the screenplay, cinematography, score, and Goth's performance—which he compared to Shelley Duvall in The Shining (1980). In a year-end retrospective for Daily Grindhouse, Preston Fassel named the film as the best horror movie of 2022 as well as "the best film of the year, period, and a bona fide cinematic classic that deserves Criterion status ASAP." Derek Smith of Slant Magazine thought that, while The Wizard of Oz references were "purposeful", they lacked "follow through", creating an impression that the film is more focused on showcasing its "cleverness" rather than enhancing its narrative or character depth.

Filmmaker Martin Scorsese was reportedly impressed by the film, calling it "mesmerizing" and stating that it was "powered by a pure, undiluted love for cinema". The New York Times named the character of Pearl one of the 93 most stylish people of 2022, highlighting her "blood red dress, lacy blue bow, smudged makeup, boots … and ax". Goth's performance as the titular character was cited by Entertainment Weekly as one of the best of the year. The Independent described the character as a cultural horror icon, while the phrase "I'm a star" became a well-known Internet meme among Gen-Z youth. Goth's performance has also been cited as an inspiration by Inde Navarrette for her role as Nikki in the 2025 feature film Obsession.

=== Accolades ===
Award	Date of ceremony	Category	Recipient(s)	Result	Ref.
Toronto International Film Festival	September 18, 2022	People's Choice Award for Midnight Madness	Pearl	Runner-up	
Sitges Film Festival	October 15, 2022	Best Feature Length Film	Pearl	Nominated	
Sitges Film Festival	October 15, 2022	Best Direction	Ti West	Won	
Sitges Film Festival	October 15, 2022	Best Actress	Mia Goth	Won	
Boston Society of Film Critics	December 11, 2022	Best Cinematography	Eliot Rockett (also for X)	Won	
Chicago Film Critics Association	December 14, 2022	Best Actress	Mia Goth	Nominated	
St. Louis Gateway Film Critics Association	December 18, 2022	Best Horror Film	Pearl	Nominated	
St. Louis Gateway Film Critics Association	December 18, 2022	Best Actress	Mia Goth	Nominated	
San Francisco Bay Area Film Critics Circle	January 9, 2023	Best Actress	Mia Goth	Nominated	
Austin Film Critics Association	January 10, 2023	Best Actress	Mia Goth	Nominated	
Seattle Film Critics Society	January 17, 2023	Best Actress in a Leading Role	Mia Goth	Nominated	
Seattle Film Critics Society	January 17, 2023	Best Villain	Pearl (portrayed by Mia Goth) (also nominee for X)	Nominated	
Online Film Critics Society	January 23, 2023	Best Actress	Mia Goth	Nominated	
Bram Stoker Award	June 17, 2023	Superior Achievement in a Screenplay	Mia Goth & Ti West	Nominated	
Independent Spirit Awards	March 4, 2023	Best Lead Performance	Mia Goth	Nominated	
Independent Spirit Awards	March 4, 2023	Best Cinematography	Eliot Rockett	Nominated	
Critics' Choice Super Awards	March 16, 2023	Best Horror Movie	Pearl	Nominated	
Critics' Choice Super Awards	March 16, 2023	Best Actress in a Horror Movie	Mia Goth	Won	
Critics' Choice Super Awards	March 16, 2023	Best Villain in a Movie	Mia Goth	Won	
Fangoria Chainsaw Awards	May 21, 2023	Best Wide Release Movie	Pearl	Nominated	
Fangoria Chainsaw Awards	May 21, 2023	Best Lead Performance	Mia Goth	Won	
Fangoria Chainsaw Awards	May 21, 2023	Best Screenplay	Mia Goth and Ti West	Nominated	
Fangoria Chainsaw Awards	May 21, 2023	Best Cinematography	Eliot Rockett	Nominated	
Fangoria Chainsaw Awards	May 21, 2023	Best Score	Tyler Bates and Tim Williams	Nominated	
Fangoria Chainsaw Awards	May 21, 2023	Best Costume Design	Malgosia Turzanska	Nominated	
Saturn Awards	February 4, 2024	Best Independent Film	Pearl	Won	
Saturn Awards	February 4, 2024	Best Film Writing	Ti West and Mia Goth	Nominated	
Saturn Awards	February 4, 2024	Best Actress in a Film	Mia Goth	Nominated	

== Follow-up ==
West announced in March 2022 that he was working on the script for a third movie in the film series, to be set chronologically after the events of X and intended to explore another subgenre of horror and continue depicting how cinema in general, and the development of home video releases in particular, have influenced society. West stated that, while a viewer can watch each movie independently without having seen the previous film, they are made to "complement each other". In describing his creative processes during the development of these films, West stated, "I'm trying to build a world out of all this, like people do these days." The filmmaker further noted, "You can't make a slasher movie without a bunch of sequels."

In September 2022, at the first Midnight Madness showing of Pearl for the 2022 Toronto International Film Festival, a third film was officially announced with a short teaser played after the credits. The clip was later released online for those not present at the event. West once again served as writer/director and one of the producers, while Mia Goth reprised her role from the first movie. Titled MaXXXine, the film takes place in 1985 and serves as a sequel to X, centered around Maxine, the only survivor of the "Massacre of X" as she continues to pursue fame in Hollywood. Though principal photography had not yet begun, the teaser trailer was shot, with the film fast-tracked to being green-lit by A24, following the successes of the previous two installments. Jacob Jaffke, Kevin Turen, and Harrison Kreiss produced, while Goth additionally served as an executive producer. It was released on July 5, 2024.

== See also ==
- List of films featuring psychopaths and sociopaths
