= Maxine Minx =

- X character
- Mia Goth as Maxine Minx in MaXXXine (2024)
- First appearance: X; 2022
- Last appearance: MaXXXine; 2024
- Created by: Ti West
- Portrayed by: Mia Goth

In-universe information
- Full name: Maxine Miller
- Alias: Maxine Minx
- Occupation: Adult film actress (formerly); Actress
- Significant other: Wayne Gilroy (late boyfriend in 1979)
- Relatives: Ernest Miller (father, estranged)
- Location: Houston (formerly); Los Angeles (current)
- Status: Alive

Maxine Minx is a fictional character in the X film series. Created by Ti West, Maxine is the protagonist of X (2022) and its sequel MaXXXine (2024). In the former, she is an aspiring adult film star; in the latter, she is well-known in this field of work and aspires to become a respected mainstream actress. In both films, she is portrayed by Mia Goth; in MaXXXine, Charley Rowan McCain portrays the character depicted as a child in a home movie.

The character has been well received by critics, praising her characterization and Goth's portrayal in both films. Critics have referred to her as a defining contemporary example of the final girl trope.

== Appearances ==
Maxine first appears in the slasher film X (2022). The film depicts Maxine as a confident aspiring adult film star in the pursuit of fame. While shooting the porn film The Farmer's Daughters on a Texas farm owned by the elderly couple, Howard and Pearl Douglas, the cast and crew are killed off. The lone survivor, Maxine has a confrontation with the elderly couple at their house before Howard has a fatal heart attack. Pearl attempts to shoot Maxine with a shotgun, but the recoil knocks her back off the porch, breaking her hip. As Pearl insults her, Maxine enters Howard's truck, reverses it, and crushes Pearl's head before driving away.

Maxine next appears in MaXXXine (2024). In this film, Maxine has become a popular name in adult movies. Still, she is not at the level of success she aspires to be—she wants to be a mainstream actress starring in legitimate films in Hollywood. Maxine succeeds in an audition for the horror film sequel The Puritan II and gets cast in the leading role. However, her colleagues and friends soon begin to be killed off by a mysterious figure, and she is pursued by a sleazy private investigator, John Labat. Maxine goes to an address John gave her and discovers her televangelist father, Ernest Miller, is behind the murders, is leading a cult, and intends to make a film exposing Hollywood's exploitative nature. Following a shootout between the cult and two LAPD detectives, she kills her father under the Hollywood sign. A month later, she is shown working on The Puritan II.

== Design ==
Maxine's style in X is in part inspired by 1970s fashion. She wears blue eyeshadow, cut-off overalls, and a striped tube top. Her appearance in the film was well-received amongst fans, with several people recreating her look. A Maxine Minx blue-eyeshadow filter on TikTok generated over 155K posts.

== Development ==
Writer and director Ti West conceptualized the heroine Maxine and elderly antagonist Pearl as having a duality. West felt Maxine and Pearl were essentially the same characters but at different places in their lives (with Maxine in pursuit of fame during her youth, and Pearl, who had the same ambitions as Maxine, living in regret and jealousy for having failed). West always intended for Maxine and Pearl to be played by the same actress—believing that it would prove a challenge for the actress cast in the role, a challenge for the special effects and that it would make sense thematically. Mia Goth ultimately got cast in both roles. However, she initially was unaware she would also be portraying Pearl, only realizing after reading the script a second time, finding the prospect exciting.

== Reception ==
Writing for MovieWeb, Will Sayre states that Maxine "has simply become one of the best movie characters in recent years." In a review for JoBlo.com, Chris Bumbray praised Goth's portrayal, writing: "With her affected southern bible belt accent, she doesn’t just chew on the scenery – she devours it. What makes Goth so good, though, is how utterly devoted she seems to inhabiting the character." Film critic Jeannette Catsoulis of The New York Times describes Maxine as a "damaged, driven heroine." Writing for Forbes, Scott Phillips states, "Mia Goth plays Maxine as a country-fried empowered woman who’s already shown audiences that the bad guys should be more afraid of her than she is of them."
