= X (2022 film) =

American film directed by Ti West

- Theatrical release poster
- Directed by: Ti West
- Written by: Ti West
- Produced by: Ti West; Jacob Jaffke; Kevin Turen; Harrison Kreiss
- Starring: Mia Goth; Jenna Ortega; Martin Henderson; Brittany Snow; Owen Campbell; Stephen Ure; Scott Mescudi
- Cinematography: Eliot Rockett
- Edited by: David Kashevaroff; Ti West
- Music by: Tyler Bates; Chelsea Wolfe
- Production companies: A24; Little Lamb; Mad Solar Productions
- Distributed by: A24
- Release dates: March 13, 2022 (SXSW); March 18, 2022 (United States)
- Running time: 106 minutes
- Country: United States
- Language: English
- Box office: $15.1 million

X is a 2022 American slasher film written, directed, produced and edited by Ti West. It stars Mia Goth in dual roles: a young woman named Maxine and an elderly woman named Pearl. The film also stars Jenna Ortega, Martin Henderson, Brittany Snow, Owen Campbell, Stephen Ure, and Scott Mescudi. Set in 1979, the film follows a cast and crew who gather to make a pornographic film on an elderly couple's rural Texas property.

A24 announced X in November 2020. Principal photography occurred in February–March 2021, primarily in Fordell, New Zealand. Goth underwent extensive prosthetic makeup for Pearl, and special effects were employed to depict violent scenes in the film. Characterized as a contemporary take on psycho-biddy, X draws inspiration from horror, exploitation, and pornographic films, and emphasizes the interplay between beauty, aging, and self-worth. The score was composed by Tyler Bates and Chelsea Wolfe.

X had its world premiere at South by Southwest on March 13, 2022, and was theatrically released in the United States five days later by A24. It received generally positive reviews from critics. It is the first installment of the X film series, followed by the prequel film Pearl (September 2022) and the sequel MaXXXine (July 2024).

== Plot ==
In 1979, police officers arrive on a lonely farm in rural Texas and find numerous dead bodies wrapped in bags. They then enter the farmhouse and find something shocking in the basement.

Twenty-four hours earlier, aspiring adult film star Maxine is on a trip to shoot a pornographic film with her producer fiancé Wayne, fellow burlesque dancer Bobby-Lynne and her Marine Corps veteran boyfriend Jackson, director RJ, and RJ's timid girlfriend Lorraine. The group arrives at a farm owned by World War veteran Howard and his wife Pearl, an elderly couple who have a guesthouse they rented for the shoot. Howard expresses his disdain to the group, but Wayne excuses this due to not informing Howard of their intentions.

While Bobby-Lynne and Jackson act out a scene, Pearl discreetly observes Maxine nude swimming in a nearby lake, before inviting her into the farmhouse. Pearl expresses an unusual fixation on her, as Maxine looks similar to Pearl in her youth. Howard returns home and Pearl rushes Maxine out, urging her to keep it a secret. Maxine returns to the guesthouse and shoots a sex scene with Jackson in the barn, as Pearl secretly watches and imagines herself in Maxine's spot. Later, Pearl attempts to seduce Howard but he turns her down, citing heart problems. That night, Lorraine participates in the shoot, upsetting RJ. When everyone is asleep, an angry RJ attempts to drive away and strand the group at the farm, but finds Pearl in the driveway. After he rebuffs her advances, Pearl stabs him repeatedly in the neck, decapitating him.

Noticing RJ's absence, Lorraine and Wayne search for him. In the barn, Wayne steps on a large nail and is stabbed in the eyes by Pearl with a pitchfork. Meanwhile, Howard lures Lorraine into their house, claiming Pearl has gone missing. He asks Lorraine to retrieve a flashlight from the basement. When she goes down, Howard locks the door and she discovers a naked male corpse hanging from the ceiling. Howard goes to the guesthouse and asks Jackson to help find Pearl. When they split up to scout the lake's perimeter, Jackson finds a car submerged in the water. After failing to draw Jackson into the water with his flashlight, Howard confronts him and shoots him in the chest. Meanwhile, Pearl sneaks into the guesthouse, undresses, and climbs into bed with Maxine, caressing her body, who awakens in horror to find Pearl lying next to her, her scream waking Bobby-Lynne.

Back in the house, Lorraine breaks through the basement door with a hatchet but Howard breaks her fingers. Bobby-Lynne finds Pearl standing on the lake's edge and tries to help her. Pearl insults Bobby-Lynne and pushes her into the water where an alligator kills her. Pearl and Howard reunite and enter the guesthouse where they have sex. Maxine escapes to the van and arms herself with a pistol. She frees Lorraine, who runs out of the front door, only to be shot by Howard. As the couple moves her body inside the house, Lorraine's corpse twitches, startling Howard and causing him to have a fatal heart attack.

Maxine retrieves the keys to Howard's truck and attempts to shoot Pearl, but finds the pistol is empty. Pearl shoots at Maxine with Howard's gun, but she dodges it and the recoil knocks Pearl back onto the porch, breaking her hip. As Maxine gets into Howard's truck, Pearl berates and insults her. Maxine reverses the truck, crushing Pearl's head before driving away. It is revealed that Maxine is the daughter of a televangelist frequently heard throughout the film. The police discover RJ's camera, with the sheriff speculating that it contains footage of "one goddamn fucked-up horror picture."

== Cast ==
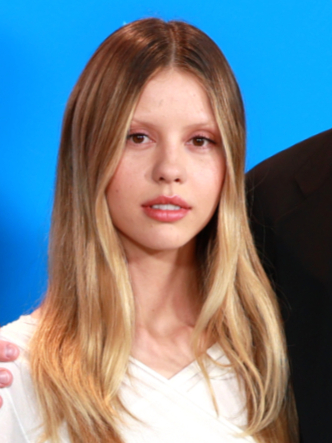
Mia Goth has a dual role as Maxine and Pearl.

- Mia Goth as Maxine Minx / Pearl
- Jenna Ortega as Lorraine
- Brittany Snow as Bobby-Lynne
- Scott Mescudi as Jackson
- Martin Henderson as Wayne
- Owen Campbell as RJ
- Stephen Ure as Howard
  - Larry Fessenden provides Howard's voice, uncredited.
- Simon Prast as a televangelist
- James Gaylyn as Sheriff Dentler

Karen Gillan has an uncredited voice cameo as a radio pitchman.

== Themes and influences ==
Nate Roscoe of Fangoria wrote in an essay on the film that X exemplifies a modern take on the psycho-biddy horror subgenre, in which aging or elderly women portray grotesque, violent characters. Roscoe also notes that the film's primary theme revolves around aging, youth, and longing over the past. "Snatching its inspo from the shadiest recesses of art and exploitation, it is the relationship between beauty, aging and self-worth that creeps most conspicuously through the architecture of X." He also notes that the film presents its antagonist—the murderous Pearl—in a manner that is sympathetic, writing that, at moments, "one can't help but feel crushingly sorry for this tragic figure."

Critics noted the influence of several films on X, with multiple commentators observing homages to the 1974 film The Texas Chain Saw Massacre. Other films cited by critics as having an influence on X include Psycho (1960), Easy Rider (1969), Hardcore (1979), The Shining (1980), Alligator (1980), and Boogie Nights (1997). Richard Roeper wrote that X also contains "echoes" of such pornographic films as Blue Movie (1969) and Debbie Does Dallas (1978).

== Production ==
In November 2020, it was announced that A24 would produce a horror film titled X, which would be written and directed by Ti West and would star Mia Goth, Scott Mescudi (who also executive produces) and Jenna Ortega. In February 2021, Brittany Snow joined the cast.

Principal photography took place in New Zealand from February 16 to March 16, 2021, in the Manawatū region of the North Island.

A number of scenes were shot in and around the city of Whanganui. Production was predominantly based at a farm in the settlement of Fordell, where a large barn was constructed as part of the production. Photography also took place in the Rangitikei District town of Bulls, where producers made use of the old town hall.

=== Special effects ===
Goth donned extensive prosthetic makeup to portray the elderly Pearl. Describing her experience, Goth stated, "It was a good 10 hours in the makeup chair, and then I'd go and do a 12-hour day on set, and the makeup artist, Sarah Rubano, who was incredible, would constantly be touching me up and making sure my contacts were all right and all those sorts of things."

The scene in which Pearl stabs RJ in the neck involved the use of a retractable prop knife, a prosthetic neck with a slit in it, and tubing to allow the passage of stage blood through the slit. The effect of RJ's subsequent decapitation was accomplished using a dummy head of RJ, with a stunt performer and a false floor; the stunt performer lay on his back, with his head and shoulders beneath the false floor and concealed by a prosthetic upper body. The performer then twitched his body during the filming of the scene, which, when paired with the disembodied dummy head, creates the illusion of RJ's body continuing to twitch after death. For the scene in which Pearl stabs Wayne in the eyes with a pitchfork, a dummy of Wayne's upper body and head was constructed by the Netherlands-based MimicFX Studio.

== Music ==
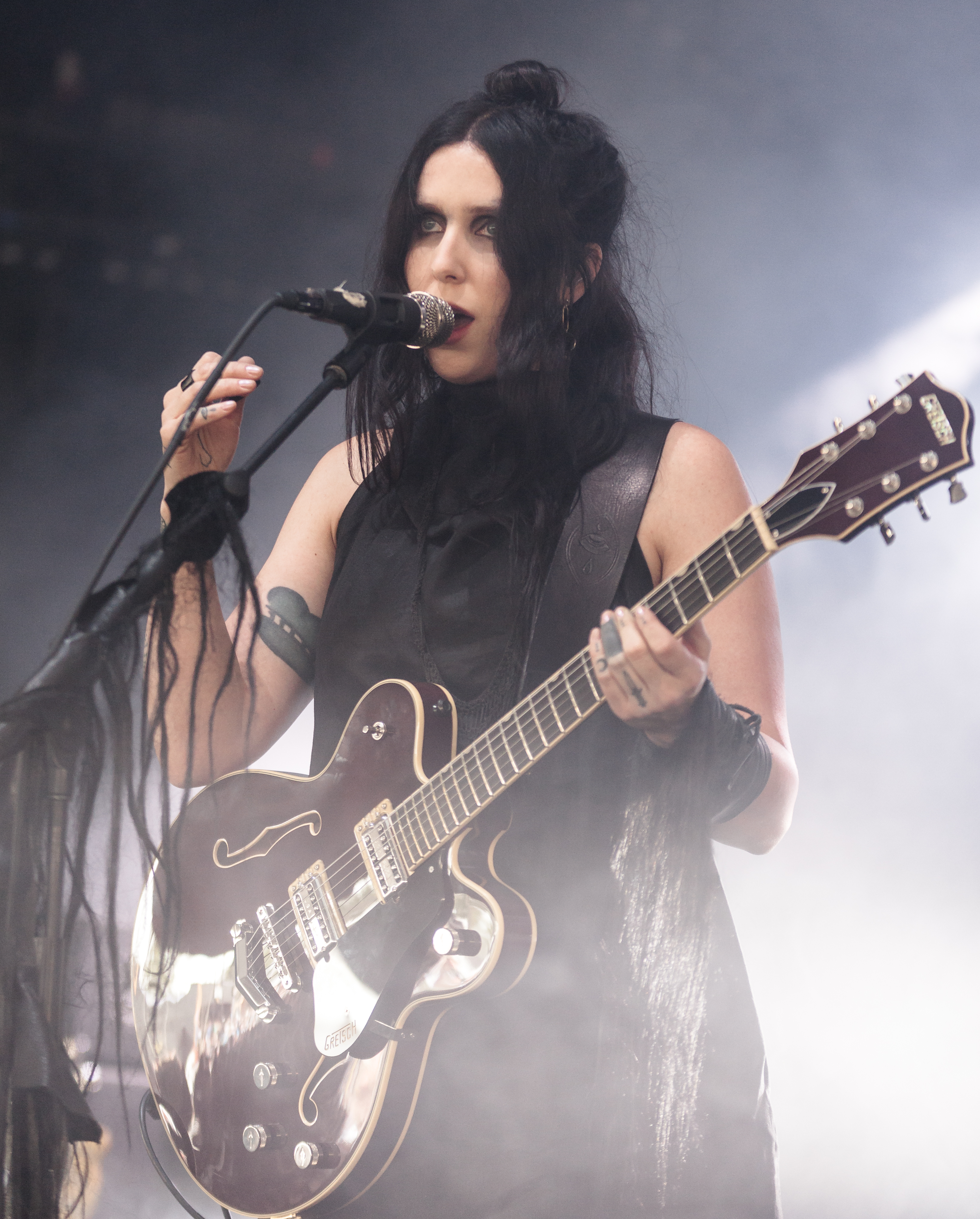
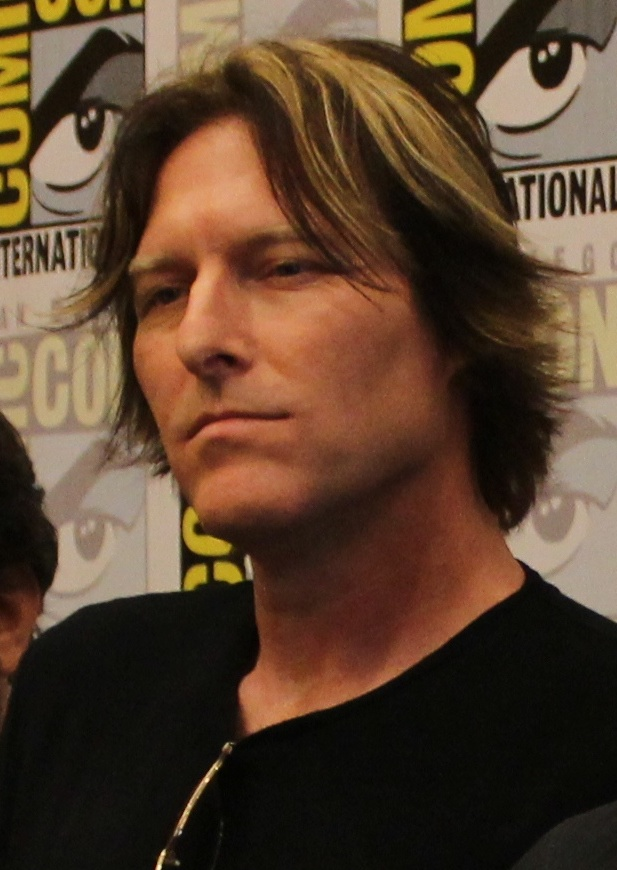
Chelsea Wolfe and Tyler Bates collaborated on the soundtrack for X.

The film's score was composed by Tyler Bates and Chelsea Wolfe, who intended to create a soundtrack with emphasis on synthesizers and vocals. Wolfe performed a cover version of "Oui, Oui, Marie" which preceded the soundtrack as a single on March 11, 2022. The soundtrack album was released on March 25, 2022, by A24 Music.

== Release ==
=== Theatrical ===
X premiered at the 2022 South by Southwest (SXSW) festival on March 13, 2022, and was released in the United States on March 18, 2022. It is the last film to be distributed by Entertainment One in Spain before the distributor's Spain division was shut down on June 29, 2023, along with its Canadian division shortly before the film's release.

The film was re-released in US–based AMC Theatres on October 11, 2023, alongside other A24-distributed films Under the Skin (2013), The Witch (2015) and Midsommar (2019). It was re-released once again on June 18, 2024, in promotion for its sequel MaXXXine (2024), including a 7-minute preview of the opening scene.

=== Home media ===
X was released on video-on-demand services on April 14, 2022. It was released on Blu-ray and DVD on May 24, 2022, by Lionsgate Home Entertainment.

== Reception ==
=== Box office ===
X grossed $11.8 million in the United States and Canada, and $3.3 million in other territories, for a worldwide total of $15.1 million, against its $5.3 million budget.

This film was long rumored to have been made for $1 million, but as executive producer, Peter Phok, stated back in 2022, that was not true. And when the New Zealand Film Commission released their Approved Screen Production Rebate numbers, it was clear that both X and its sequel, Pearl, were each made for more than the rumored $1 million.

In the United States and Canada, X was released alongside Jujutsu Kaisen 0, The Outfit, and Umma, and was projected to gross $2–5 million in its opening weekend. The film earned $4.3 million from 2,865 theaters in its opening weekend, finishing fourth. Men made up 55% of the audience during its opening, with those in the age range of 18–34 comprising 73% of ticket sales. The ethnic breakdown of the audience showed that 50% were Caucasian, 22% Hispanic and Latino Americans, 12% African American, and 16% Asian or other. The film made $2.2 million in its second weekend and $1 million in its third. It dropped out of the box office top ten in its fourth weekend with $359,067 (a drop of 65%).

=== Critical response ===
On the review aggregator website Rotten Tomatoes, the film has an approval rating of 94% based on 229 reviews, with an average rating of 7.7/10. The website's critics consensus reads: "A fresh spin on the classic slasher formula, X marks the spot where Ti West gets resoundingly back to his horror roots." On Metacritic, which uses a weighted average, the film has a score of 80 out of 100 based on 35 critics, indicating "generally favorable reviews". Audiences polled by PostTrak gave the film a 68% positive score, with 45% saying they would definitely recommend it.

Reviewing the film following its SXSW premiere, Owen Gleiberman of Variety called it "a deliberate, loving, and meticulous homage" to 1974's The Texas Chain Saw Massacre, as well as "a wily and entertaining slow-motion ride of terror that earns its shocks, along with its singular quease factor, which relates to the fact that the demons here are ancient specimens of humanity who actually have a touch of... humanity." John DeFore of The Hollywood Reporter commended the film's cast and noted that, "Before the gore begins (and even mid-action), West seems to truly consider the pain of irretrievable youth, and feel for those whose final years are consumed by it." The A.V. Club's Todd Gilchrist gave the film a grade of "B+", writing that it "examines the way that youth in others seems to bring out the feeling and impact of age in ourselves, not to mention how we resist or respond to that when it happens," and calling it "bloody, ballsy fun". Abby Olcese, writing for RogerEbert.com, gave the film a score of three out of four stars, concluding: "X is plenty of fun; it also feels like a trifle that could easily have been much more."

Upon release, The Atlantic's David Sims called the film "a modern classic", comparing it with 2022's Texas Chainsaw Massacre, which he felt failed creatively compared to X. Richard Roeper of the Chicago Sun-Times awarded the film three-and-a-half out of four stars, calling it "the kind of movie that has you reeling in disgust at certain moments, then laughing at the blood-spattered absurdity of it all. It's a new twist on the period-piece slasher movie, smart and strange and fantastically depraved." A. O. Scott, in a review of the film for The New York Times, wrote that X "isn't shy about appealing to voyeurism. There's nothing coy or arty about the bloodletting. [...] West, unlike his pornographers, has things to say as well as bodies to show. Most of all, he has an aesthetic that isn't all about terror or titillation. X is full of dreamy, haunting overhead shots and moments of surprising tenderness."

Valerie Complex of Deadline Hollywood referred to the film as "a new love letter to the slasher film genre", writing: "I give West credit for having a vision and sticking to his influences. He knows what he wants to do and how to execute it unapologetically. X is surface-level entertainment [...] but still a satisfying piece of indie horror filmmaking that's worth taking a chance on." Dmitry Samarov of the Chicago Reader gave the film a mostly negative review, writing that "even the most casual horror fan won't miss" the references that X makes to 1974's Texas Chain Saw Massacre, but that, "unlike Tobe Hooper's masterpiece, which has a point to make about economic desperation and cultural clash in 70s America, West just wants to punish everyone involved in gory ways played for laughs."

=== Accolades ===
Award	Date of ceremony	Category	Recipient(s)	Result	Ref.
MTV Movie & TV Awards	June 5, 2022	Most Frightened Performance	Mia Goth	Nominated	
Hollywood Critics Association Midseason Film Awards	July 1, 2022	Best Actress	Mia Goth	Nominated	
Hollywood Critics Association Midseason Film Awards	July 1, 2022	Best Horror	X	Nominated	
Hollywood Critics Association Midseason Film Awards	July 1, 2022	Best Indie Film	X	Nominated	
Saturn Awards	October 25, 2022	Best Horror Film	X	Nominated	
Hollywood Music in Media Awards	November 16, 2022	Best Music Supervision — Film	Joe Rudge	Nominated	
North Texas Film Critics Association	December 18, 2022	Best Newcomer	Jenna Ortega	Nominated	
Sunset Circle Awards	November 29, 2022	Best Actress	Mia Goth (also nominee for Pearl)	Nominated	
Sunset Circle Awards	November 29, 2022	Best Horror Film	X	Won	
Sunset Circle Awards	November 29, 2022	Five Fire Directors	Ti West (also nominee for Pearl)	Nominated	
Boston Society of Film Critics	December 11, 2022	Best Cinematography	Eliot Rockett (also for Pearl)	Won	
St. Louis Gateway Film Critics Association	December 18, 2022	Best Horror Film	X	Nominated	
Austin Film Critics Association	January 10, 2023	Breakthrough Artist Award	Jenna Ortega (also nominee for The Fallout, Scream and Studio 666)	Won	
Seattle Film Critics Society	January 17, 2023	Best Villain	Pearl (portrayed by Mia Goth) (also nominee for Pearl)	Nominated	
Hollywood Critics Association Awards	February 24, 2023	Best Horror Film	X	Nominated	

== Prequel and sequel ==
In March 2022, it was revealed that a prequel film, Pearl, was secretly shot back-to-back with the first film. West directed and co-wrote the film with Goth. Principal photography took place in New Zealand, and upon official announcement was already in the post-production stage. Goth reprises her role as a younger-aged Pearl. A24 produced the project, with Jacob Jaffke, Harrison Kreiss and Kevin Turen serving as producers, and West, Goth, Mescudi and Sam Levinson as executive producers. A sneak preview was also shown in X's post-credits scene for North American releases only. Pearl was released theatrically in North America on September 16, 2022, approximately six months after the release of X.

A third installment in the series, MaXXXine, was announced shortly before the release of Pearl. It was released on July 5, 2024, and focuses on Maxine in 1980s Los Angeles, following the events depicted in X.
