= MaXXXine =

2024 film by Ti West

- Theatrical release poster
- Directed by: Ti West
- Written by: Ti West
- Produced by: Jacob Jaffke; Ti West; Kevin Turen; Harrison Kreiss; Mia Goth
- Starring: Mia Goth; Elizabeth Debicki; Moses Sumney; Michelle Monaghan; Bobby Cannavale; Halsey; Lily Collins; Giancarlo Esposito; Kevin Bacon
- Cinematography: Eliot Rockett
- Edited by: Ti West
- Music by: Tyler Bates
- Production company: Motel Mojave
- Distributed by: A24
- Release dates: June 24, 2024 (TCL Chinese Theatre); July 5, 2024 (United States)
- Running time: 104 minutes
- Country: United States
- Language: English
- Budget: <$10 million
- Box office: $22.1 million

MaXXXine is a 2024 American horror film written, directed, produced, and edited by Ti West. It is the third and final installment in West's X trilogy and a direct sequel to X (2022). Mia Goth reprises her role as Maxine Minx, starring alongside Elizabeth Debicki, Moses Sumney, Michelle Monaghan, Bobby Cannavale, Halsey, Lily Collins, Giancarlo Esposito, and Kevin Bacon. In the film, Maxine sets out for fame and success in 1980s Hollywood while being targeted by a mysterious killer.

MaXXXine had its premiere at the TCL Chinese Theatre in Los Angeles on June 24, 2024, and was released in the United States by A24 on July 5, 2024. The film grossed $22 million worldwide, becoming the highest-grossing film of the series.

== Plot ==
In 1985 Los Angeles, amid the Night Stalker murders, Maxine Minx successfully auditions for the lead in a new horror film, The Puritan II, despite all of her previous film credits being in adult films. After sharing the news with her friend Leon and colleague Amber James, the latter invites Maxine to a party in the Hollywood Hills, which she declines. Maxine goes to work at her second job, a live peep show, where a mysterious, leather-clad figure watches with anger.

She meets another adult entertainer, Tabby Martin, who also invites her to the party that Amber mentioned, but Maxine declines again. As she walks home she is followed by a figure dressed as Buster Keaton, who corners her in an alleyway, brandishing a switchblade. Maxine pulls a gun on him, makes him strip, puts the gun in his mouth and forces him to perform fellatio on it, before stomping on and crushing his testicles with her boot.

The leather-clad figure leaves a police evidence VHS tape, which contains the adult film Maxine and her now-deceased friends had attempted to make six years prior. (Note: As depicted in X (2022)) Upon watching it, she asks a confused Leon to find out where it came from. Meanwhile, in the Hollywood Hills, Amber and Tabby are killed and have their bodies branded with Satanic symbols.

Maxine is invited to meet with John Labat, a private investigator who informs her that her previous crimes will be revealed unless she meets with his employer, telling her she must appear at a specific address on Starlight Drive later that night or risk repercussions. LAPD detectives Williams and Torres question Maxine about Tabby and Amber, but she refuses to answer them. She later sees Labat following her and attacks him, warning him to stay away from her.

Maxine confides in her agent, Teddy Knight, who agrees to help her. Ignoring Labat's demands, Maxine begins learning the script for The Puritan II. Meanwhile, Leon is slaughtered in his video store by the mysterious, leather-clad figure. On the set of The Puritan II, Maxine meets the star of the first film, Molly Bennett, who mentions a similar party in the Hollywood Hills.

Soon after, Labat, angered by Maxine attacking him the previous day, chases her across the Universal Studios Lot with a gun before being caught and escorted away by security. Maxine tricks Labat into following her, during which she, Knight, and her friend Shepard Turei ambush Labat, and subsequently trap him inside of his car to be crushed by a junkyard compressor.

Maxine visits the address Labat gave her, which leads her to a house in the Hollywood Hills. She finds Molly's dismembered body inside a suitcase and learns the murders have been committed by her estranged father Ernest Miller, the televangelist, with the assistance of other fundamentalist members in his ministry. Miller reveals he and his followers have been filming the murders to create a snuff film intended to expose Hollywood for what he sees as its sinful and corrupting nature.

Thinking he can still "save" his daughter, Miller has his followers tie Maxine to a tree for an impromptu exorcism, which he also films. Detectives Torres and Williams interrupt the ceremony and cause a shootout, killing Miller's cohorts, injuring Miller, and giving Maxine time to free herself before the detectives are fatally wounded while pursuing Miller. Armed with a shotgun, Maxine eventually confronts her father at the Hollywood sign but is interrupted by a police helicopter.

Maxine envisions herself as a celebrity credited for helping stop her father, attending the premiere of The Puritan II and revealing in an interview that the film's director, Elizabeth Bender, will be directing a biographical film about her. Returning to reality, before telling him he gave her what she needed – divine intervention, Maxine shoots her father in the face with the shotgun, killing him instantly. A month later, Maxine continues her work on The Puritan II, hoping her success will never end.

== Cast ==
- Mia Goth as Maxine Miller
  - Charley Rowan McCain as young Maxine Miller
- Elizabeth Debicki as Elizabeth Bender, a British film director working on The Puritan II
- Moses Sumney as Leon Green, a video store employee and Maxine's close friend
- Michelle Monaghan as Detective Williams
- Bobby Cannavale as Detective Torres
- Halsey as Tabby Martin, a porn star and Maxine's friend
- Lily Collins as Molly Bennett, a British actress who played the lead of the first Puritan film
- Giancarlo Esposito as Teddy Knight, Esq., an agent for the adult film industry and Z–list film actors
- Kevin Bacon as John Labat, a private investigator
- Simon Prast as Reverend Ernest Miller, a televangelist and Maxine's estranged father
- Sophie Thatcher as an FX Artist
- Uli Latukefu as Shephard Turei
- Chloe Farnworth as Amber James, a porn star and Maxine's friend
- Deborah Geffner as Elaine, a casting director
- Ned Vaughn as the news anchor
- Larry Fessenden as a security guard
- Toby Huss as a coroner

== Production ==
=== Development ===
In March 2022, West announced that he was working on the script for a third film in the X series, to be set chronologically after the events of X. The project was stated to explore another sub-genre of horror and continue the depiction of cinema's influence on society, exploring how the development of home video releases did so. West stated that while a viewer can watch each movie independently without seeing the previous film, the films were made to "complement each other".

In June 2022, executive producer Peter Phok confirmed that a third film was officially in development, with West attached to the project. In September 2022, at the first Midnight Madness showing of Pearl for the 2022 Toronto International Film Festival, a third film was officially announced, with a short teaser played after the post-credits. The clip was later released online for those not present at the event. West once again serves as writer/director and one of the producers, while Mia Goth will reprise her role from the first movie. Taking place in 1985 and titled MaXXXine, the plot was confirmed to centre around Maxine, the only survivor of the "Massacre of X", as she continues to pursue her future in Hollywood. The teaser trailer was shot with the film fast-tracked to being green-lit by A24, following the successes of the previous two installments. Jacob Jaffke, Kevin Turen, and Harrison Kreiss were tapped to serve as producers, with Goth being listed as an executive producer.

According to West, the original ending involved a supernatural element involving haunting in regards to the character of Pearl but he elected to take it out because it "just felt like going backward". In January 2023, Goth stated that the script was complete and that the story was (in her opinion) the best of the series so far. The actress stated that many of the previous production team members would return, with principal photography scheduled to commence later that year.

=== Casting ===
In April 2023, it was announced that Elizabeth Debicki, Moses Sumney, Michelle Monaghan, Bobby Cannavale, Lily Collins, Halsey, Giancarlo Esposito, and Kevin Bacon had been added to the cast.

=== Filming ===
Principal photography took place from April to May 2023 in Los Angeles for seven weeks. The film was towards the end of editing in February 2024.

In January 2024, it was reported that Goth was being sued by background actor James Hunter, who played a corpse on set, for allegedly kicking him intentionally in the head and then taunting him about it. The suit also includes a wrongful termination claim against A24 and West.

== Marketing ==
On September 13, 2022, a teaser trailer announcing a sequel to X, titled MaXXXine, was released shortly following the premiere of Pearl at the 2022 Toronto International Film Festival. It featured the 1984 synth-pop song "Obsession" by Animotion. Scott Wampler of Fangoria was delighted by the surprise announcement and called the teaser "pitch-perfect, hall of fame–level."

On May 1, 2023, a first-look image of Goth and Halsey in costume as their respective characters was shared on A24's and the film's social media accounts. They were captioned "The life she deserves", referencing the personal mantra spoken throughout X by Maxine. Glenn Rowley of Billboard noted Goth's dramatic costume shift from her "Little House on the Prairie–esque look" to a "tousled blonde mane and iridescent green windbreaker."

== Music ==
Tyler Bates composed the film's score, as he did for X and Pearl. With MaXXXine's score, Bates aimed to create a "bespoke" atmosphere with synthesizers and vocal manipulation, as well as various instruments brought together to create an "unorthodox" sound, with primary focus on the saxophone. It was released alongside the film on July 5, 2024, by A24 Music. The film also uses several songs from its time period as its soundtrack, such as "Gimme All Your Lovin'" by ZZ Top, "In My House" by The Mary Jane Girls, "Welcome to the Pleasuredome" by Frankie Goes to Hollywood, "Obsession" by Animotion, "St. Elmo's Fire (Man in Motion)" by John Parr, and "Bette Davis Eyes" by Kim Carnes.

== Release ==
MaXXXine had its premiere at the TCL Chinese Theatre in Los Angeles on June 24, 2024. It was released in the United States by A24 on July 5, 2024.

=== Home media ===
The film was released on VOD on August 2, 2024. It was released on Blu-ray and 4K Ultra HD on October 8, 2024, by Lionsgate Home Entertainment. It was the final A24 film to be released on physical media by Lionsgate, as their home video partnership quietly ended some time after, leading A24 to switch to in-house production for their subsequent disc releases. The film was once again released on Blu-ray and 4K Ultra HD on October 21, 2025, by A24, as part of a trilogy set along with X and Pearl.

== Reception ==
=== Box office ===
MaXXXine grossed $15.1 million in the United States and Canada, and $6.9 million in other territories, for a worldwide total of $22 million.

In the United States and Canada, MaXXXine was projected to gross around $7 million from 2,200 theaters in its opening weekend. The film made $3.1 million on its first day, and went on to debut to $6.7 million, finishing in fourth.

=== Critical response ===
Variety reported that the reviews leaned towards positive, while Uproxx described them as mixed. On the review aggregator website Rotten Tomatoes, 73% of 295 critics' reviews are positive, with an average rating of 6.5/10. The website's consensus reads: "Intoxicating with its maxxximal style, MaXXXine is an uneven but vibrant pastiche that drives a stiletto through Hollywood's heart." Metacritic, which uses a weighted average, assigned the film a score of 64 out of 100, based on 50 critics, indicating "generally favorable" reviews. Audiences polled by CinemaScore gave the film an average grade of "B" on an A+ to F scale (up from Pearl's "B-"), while those polled by PostTrak gave the film a 76% positive score, with 59% saying they would definitely recommend it.

=== Accolades ===
Award	Date of ceremony	Category	Nominee(s)	Result	Ref.
Saturn Awards	February 2, 2025	Best Independent Film	MaXXXine	Nominated	
Make-Up Artists and Hair Stylists Guild Awards	February 15, 2025	Best Period and/or Character Make-Up	Sarah Rubano, Mandy Artusato, Akiko Matsumoto	Nominated	

== Future ==
MaXXXine was originally developed as the end of the X trilogy; however Ti West later stated in February 2024 that he has plans for a fourth film, which would depend on the third film's reception. In May 2024, West confirmed that he was working on a fourth film and that he may develop it as his next project. However, in August 2024, during a Reddit AMA, he stated that he is "happy with where [he] left it" and that MaXXXine is the end of the series.
