= Matthew Sunderland =

New Zealand actor

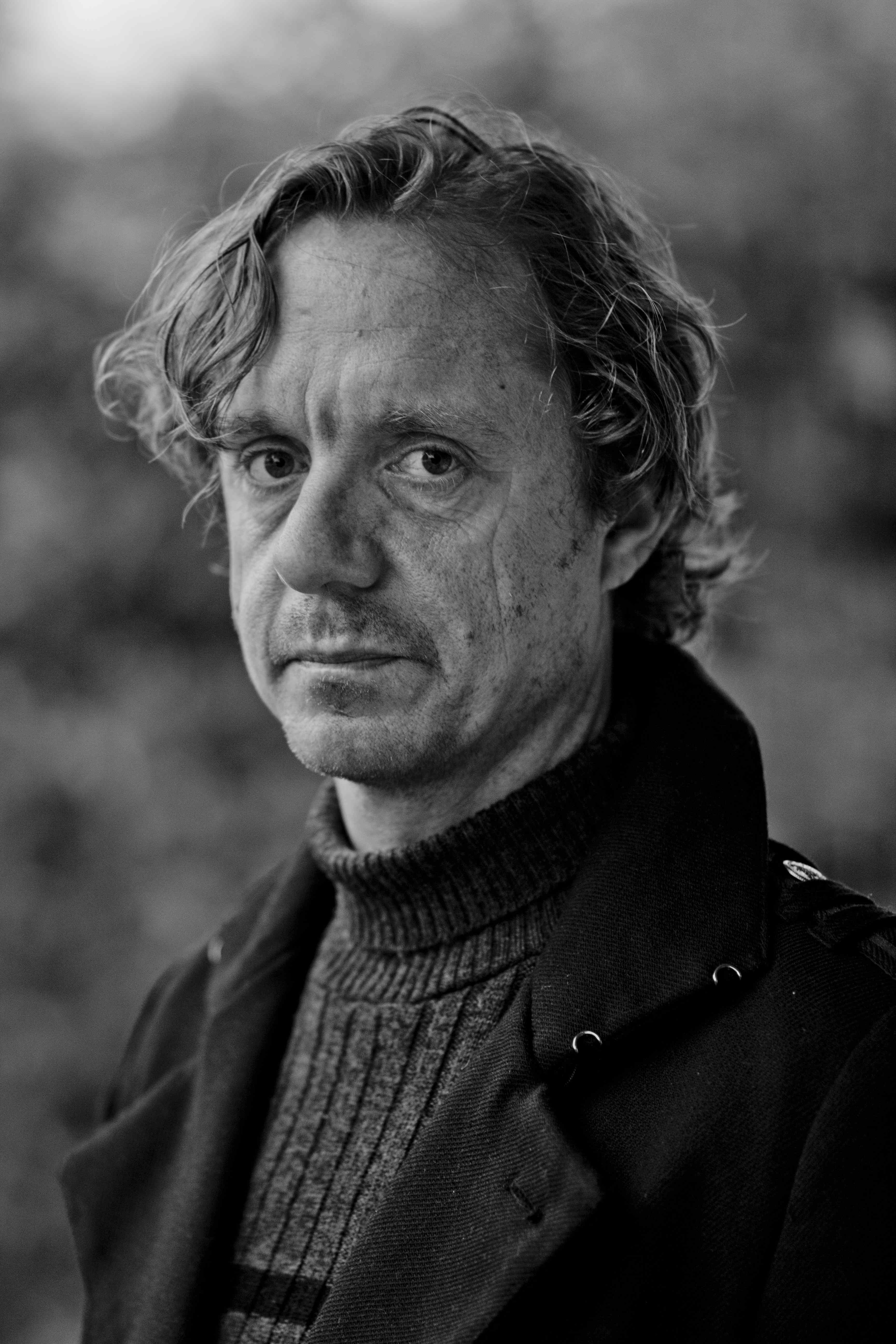
- Born: 1972 (age 53–54)
- Education: Toi Whakaari
- Occupation: Actor

Matthew Sunderland (born c. 1972) is a New Zealand actor, writer, and director. He performed the lead role of David Gray in the feature film Out of the Blue, based on the events of the Aramoana Massacre. At the New Zealand Screen Awards in 2008 he won Best Actor Award for this role.

== Education ==
Sunderland graduated from Toi Whakaari in 1997.

== Career ==
Sunderland starred as Uncle Rory in Daniel Borgman's debut feature The Weight of Elephants. He was nominated for a Best Actor Award in the 2006 NZ Screen Awards for Nature's Way, which screened In Competition at the Cannes Film Festival in 2006.

His other feature film roles include A Song of Good, Christmas, Stringer Woodenhead Existence, and The Devil's Rock.

Sunderland made his directorial and screenwriting debut with the short film Tuffy, which deals with estrangement between a father and son, in small town New Zealand.

In 2013, Sunderland played in the stage adaptation of Kate Grenville’s Booker Prize-shortlisted The Secret River with the Sydney Theatre Company, which toured throughout Australia. He also appeared in Shortland Street as White Dragon, in a storyline concluding the three-year Kieran Mitchell story arc.

In 2016, Sunderland played the role of a drunken man resisting alien abduction in the music video for "Bergschrund" by DJ Shadow and Nils Frahm.

Sunderland played the chemist, Joseph Pritchard in the 2020 miniseries The Luminaries.

== Filmography ==
=== Film ===
Year	Title	Role	Notes
1992	Desperate Remedies	Chorus #15	
1992	Absent Without Leave	Paul	
2003	Christmas	Brett	
2003	Woodenhead	Strong Man	
2006	Out of the Blue	David Gray	
2007	The Last Magic Show	Lemuel	
2008	A Song of Good	Denis	
2009	The Strength of Water	Hunter	
2009	Under the Mountain	Wilberforce Drone 1	
2010	Tracker	Posse Soldier Crowther	
2011	The Devil's Rock	Colonel Klaus Meyer	
2012	Existence	Rider	
2013	The Weight of Elephants	Uncle Rory	
2014	The Little Death	Wiry Man	
2015	Backtrack	Steve	
2016	The Lost City of Z	Dan	
2017	6 Days	Tom Lovett	
2018	The Nightingale	Davey / Settler 2	
2019	Savage	Dad	
2020	Bloody Hell	Father	
2022	The Stranger	Controller / Detective Sergeant Cross	
2022	Pearl	Pearl's Father	

=== Television ===
Year	Title	Role	Notes
1996	Hercules: The Legendary Journeys	Shepherd	Episode: "Promises"
1999	Duggan	Private Ewen Daly	Episode: "Last Resort"
2001	Cleopatra 2525	Tox	Episode: "In Your Boots"
2004	Power Rangers Dino Thunder	Monster General #2	Episode: "Lost & Found in Translation"
2005	Mataku	The Viper	Episode: "The Photo - Te Whakaahua"
2005	Power Rangers S.P.D.	Green Eyes	Episode: "Perspectives"
2005	Talent	Geoff	Television film
2008	Kiss Me Deadly	Vigo	Television film
2009	Piece of My Heart	Sharp	Television film
2010	This Is Not My Life	The Cleaner	2 episodes
2013	Top of the Lake	Voice of Choppy 1	Episode: "Searchers Voice"
2013	Harry	Spud	4 episodes
2016	Rake	Phil	Episode #4.5
2017	Wanted	Bryce	4 episodes
2020	The Luminaries	Joseph Pritchard	6 episodes
2024	Plum	Bukowski	4 episodes
