= The House of the Devil (soundtrack) =

2009 film soundtrack album

The House of the Devil (Original Motion Picture Soundtrack)

Film score by Jeff Grace
- Released: November 10, 2009
- Recorded: 2009
- Studio: Dubway Studios, Manhattan, New York City; Bushwick Studios, Brooklyn, New York City
- Genre: Film score
- Length: 32:45
- Label: MovieScore Media
- Producer: Dave Eggar; Jeff Grace; Mike Armstrong

Jeff Grace chronology
| I Sell the Dead (2009) | The House of the Devil (2009) | Stake Land (2010) |

The House of the Devil (Original Motion Picture Soundtrack) is the soundtrack to the 2009 film The House of the Devil directed by Ti West. The film's musical score is composed by Jeff Grace. His score was released as a double-feature along with another score he composed for the horror film I Can See You on November 10, 2009. A standalone vinyl LP of the album was published by Death Waltz Recording Company which released it in September 2014.

== Development ==
Jeff Grace, who composed music for West's The Roost (2005) and Trigger Man (2007) wrote the score for The House of the Devil. West and Grace often discussed about creating an unusual soundscape for the film, with the former having ideas for different sounds. Hence, the piano was the first element in their conversations. The film provided an isolated element in Samantha's case as she was babysitting for a mysterious family and the events that follow, provided an isolated element, and despite the momentary pauses, this provided an opportunity to create the sonic world to attract the audience.

Grace did not want to overstate information or provide too much attention to the score in detail, as part of the film revolves around the tension building. The use of strings and orchestra had signified this information while the piano serves as a mystery element. Grace utilized prepared piano over the conventional piano score to keep the mystery and tension alive, which West wanted to evoke through his piano theme.

== Release ==
The soundtrack was released as a double feature with Grace's another film score I Can See You on November 10, 2009. The album features 14 tracks from this film, and 12 tracks from I Can See You. A standalone album was released in LPs through Death Waltz Recording Company and Mondo on September 27, 2014.

== Reception ==
Reviewing the double album, Jonathan Broxton of Movie Music UK stated "both these scores clearly indicate that Jeff Grace is a composer of considerable talent, especially in the horror genre, and who has a bright future ahead of him." Peter Debruge of Variety called it a "period-appropriate synthesizer score". Hunter Stephenson of /Film wrote "When Samantha reaches the House, [Jeff] Grace's traditional, instrumental score creeps in and begins to feel omnipresent even when it vanishes. At first, Grace's keys mirror so many doomed yet careful footsteps up to the House, signaling those before Samantha. Once inside, the strings feel expressed by a darker, larger force not unlike the score from There Will Be Blood; both encapsulate a hypnotic power outside the bodies and minds of the respective main characters: unprecedented ambition mixed with atheism is replaced by doting innocence and Satanism."

Michael Gingold of Fangoria wrote "Just as important, if not even more so, is the soundtrack; as they did in The Roost, composer Jeff Grace and audio designer Graham Reznick create a sonic atmosphere that suggests something terrible is about to happen at any moment." Paul McCannibal of Dread Central stated that "The music and sound design are stellar". Kirk Honeycutt of The Hollywood Reporter described it as a "low-key music score rumbling ominously beneath the surface tedium as “escalating tension.”" R. L. Shaffer of IGN called it a "period-appropriate and effective score."

== Track listing ==
| No. | Title | Length |
|---|---|---|
| 1. | "Opening" | 1:10 |
| 2. | "Family Photos" | 2:24 |
| 3. | "The View Upstairs" | 1:45 |
| 4. | "Original Inhabitants" | 3:05 |
| 5. | "Meeting Mr. Ulman" | 1:12 |
| 6. | "Keep the Change" | 1:12 |
| 7. | "Footsteps" | 1:27 |
| 8. | "Mother" | 3:07 |
| 9. | "Chalice" | 0:51 |
| 10. | "On the Run" | 3:45 |
| 11. | "Lights Out" | 3:04 |
| 12. | "He's Calling You" | 1:50 |
| 13. | "The House of the Devil" | 5:49 |
| 14. | "Mrs. Ulman" | 2:04 |
| Total length: | | 32:45 |

== Personnel ==
Credits adapted from liner notes:

- Music composer, conductor and orchestrator – Jeff Grace
- Producer – Dave Eggar, Jeff Grace, Mike Armstrong
- Recording – Josh Kessler, Nancy Magarill
- Additional recording – Chaz DeVito, Chris Abell
- Mixing – Josh Tidsbury
- Mastering – Konstantin Braticevic
- Music editor – Jeff Grace, Mikael Carlsson
- Executive producer – Mikael Carlsson
- Copyist – Adriana Grace
- Liner notes – A.J., Jeff Grace, Ti West, Tom Hodge
- Artwork – Tom Hodge, Neil Kellerhouse
- Photography – Graham Reznick

Instruments

- Bass – Gregg August
- Bass trombone – Derek Crosier
- Bassoon – Tom Sefcovic
- Cello – Dave Eggar
- Clarinet, bass clarinet – Meighan Stoops
- Flute – Sato Moughalian
- Horn – Louis Schwadron
- Percussion – Alan Bachman
- Piano – Jeff Grace
- Trombone – Mike Engstrom
- Trumpet – CJ Camerieri
- Tuba – Jason Koi
- Viola – Jon Weber
- Violin – Rachel Golub, Tom Chiu, Theresa Solomon

== Accolades ==
| Award | Year | Category | Recipient | Result |
|---|---|---|---|---|
| Screamfest Horror Film Festival | 2009 | Best Musical Score | Jeff Grace | Won |
| Fangoria Chainsaw Awards | 2010 | Best Score | Jeff Grace | Nominated |
