= In a Valley of Violence =

2016 film

- Theatrical release poster
- Directed by: Ti West
- Written by: Ti West
- Produced by: Jason Blum; Jacob Jaffke; Peter Phok
- Starring: Ethan Hawke; Taissa Farmiga; James Ransone; Karen Gillan; John Travolta
- Cinematography: Eric Robbins
- Edited by: Ti West
- Music by: Jeff Grace
- Production company: Blumhouse Productions
- Distributed by: Focus World (United States); Universal Pictures (International)
- Release dates: March 12, 2016 (SXSW); October 21, 2016 (United States)
- Running time: 99 minutes
- Country: United States
- Language: English
- Box office: $61,797

In a Valley of Violence is a 2016 American Western film written, directed, and edited by Ti West. It stars Ethan Hawke, Taissa Farmiga, James Ransone, Karen Gillan, and John Travolta. Jason Blum serves as producer through his Blumhouse Productions banner.

In a Valley of Violence had its world premiere at South by Southwest on March 12, 2016, and was released in a limited release and through video on demand on October 21, 2016, by Focus World. Despite receiving positive reviews from critics, the film was a box office disappointment, grossing only $61,797 in the box office.

== Plot ==
A drifter named Paul and his dog, Abbie, make their way towards Mexico through the desert of the Old West in the early 1870s. They encounter Priest, a bandit and disgraced clergyman who tries to steal Paul's horse after claiming that his mule is about to give out on him, but Paul whistles and Abbie attacks the would-be robber. Paul takes Priest's ammunition and his water canteen, before pouring out a bottle of whiskey on the man's wounds and leaving.

Paul enters Denton, a former boomtown on its last legs. In the tavern, Paul meets Gilly, an obnoxious and cocky young man who issues a challenge to fight when Paul threatens him. Gilly approaches Abbie to coax Paul outside, and Paul drops him with a single punch. As Gilly's fiancée Ellen rushes to his aid, Paul heads to the inn, where he meets Ellen's younger sister Mary-Anne. She thanks him for standing up to Gilly and draws Paul and Abbie a bath. U.S. Marshal Clyde Martin, Gilly's father, meets Paul in the inn. Clyde assured Paul that he knows Gilly provoked him but that he won't tolerate an assault on one of his deputies. After identifying Paul as an ex-soldier, Clyde tells him to leave Denton in the morning. Mary-Anne gives Paul a picture to remember her.

That night, Paul and Abbie are jumped by Gilly and Clyde's deputies Tubby, Roy, and Harris as they try to sleep. Gilly accuses Paul of being a deserter and shoots and stabs Abbie to death. He then has Roy and Harris push Paul off a nearby cliff, expecting the fall to kill him but not bothering to check. Paul wakes up the next day, buries Abbie and tells her that he is going to break his promise to her that he would never take another life. On his way back to town, Paul runs into Priest, and takes his mule and revolver.

In Denton, Mary-Anne shelters Paul and offers help. She begs Paul to take her away after he gets revenge, as she has no future in Denton. He refuses, telling her that he abandoned his wife and daughter to enlist in the army and could not bear to see them again after the atrocities he committed. At the hotel, Paul slits Roy's throat as he is bathing. Clyde is alerted to the situation and realizes what Gilly did. He has Harris lock up the jailhouse arsenal and station himself on the roof while Gilly guards the hotel. Gilly accuses Mary-Anne of aiding Paul and while arguing Ellen reveals to Gilly that she is pregnant with his child.

Paul ambushes Harris and forces him to fire on Clyde and Tubby as they make their way to the jailhouse; neither man is hit, but Paul then grabs Harris's rifle, kills him, and throws his body into the street. Inside the jailhouse, upset at the deaths of Roy and Harris, Tubby throws down his gun and starts arguing with Clyde. Paul shoots Tubby in the back through a window. Clyde agrees to disarm himself and surrender so he and Paul can talk. Gilly then comes out of the hotel to kill Paul, but Clyde gets between them to try and negotiate. Gilly and Paul shoot at each other with Clyde between them, killing him in the process.

Paul, wounded and out of ammunition, hides in a nearby stable. When Gilly enters, Paul slips a noose over his head and attempts to hang him before dropping him still breathing to the ground after his injuries kick in. Paul then resorts to beating Gilly with his own boot. As a blood-covered Gilly draws his knife, Mary-Anne appears and shoots him in the back with Tubby's gun. Mary-Anne and Paul make their way back to the inn, while a guilt-ridden Ellen finds Gilly's body. Priest wanders back into Denton and Paul tells him that he should stay, because "we could all use a little saving."

== Cast ==
- Ethan Hawke as Paul, an Indian Wars veteran and drifter
- John Travolta as U.S. Marshal Clyde Martin, the pragmatic but ruthless lawman who controls Denton. He has a wooden leg from serving in the military
- Taissa Farmiga as Mary-Anne, the innkeeper who grows fond of Paul
- James Ransone as Deputy Marshal Gilly Martin, an arrogant and corrupt lawman who runs afoul of Paul
- Karen Gillan as Ellen, Gilly's lover and Mary-Anne's condescending older sister
- Burn Gorman as Priest, an alcoholic gunslinger who wanders from town to town offering salvation
- Kaius Harrison as James T. Baxter, a salesman thrown out of Denton for overpricing his merchandise
- Toby Huss as Deputy Marshal Harris
- Larry Fessenden as Deputy Marshal Roy
- Tommy Nohilly as Deputy Marshal Tubby (a.k.a. "Lawrence")
- Jumpy as Abbie, a Cheyenne dog adopted by Paul and named for his daughter

== Production ==
=== Pre-production ===
I had a Western that I was going to write. Then I heard Ethan Hawke wanted to do a Western, so I went to New York where he was doing Macbeth and I asked him about Westerns and pitched him my idea, and he liked it. So I was like, 'Alright, when you wrap, I'm going to send you a script and if you want to do it, let's do it, [and] if you don't, I'll just take the risk.'

— Ti West on the development of the project and his first meeting with Hawke

The film was written and directed by Ti West, in collaboration with Jason Blum of Blumhouse Productions and Universal Pictures. West also served as a producer for the project, alongside Blum, Jacob Jaffke and Peter Phok. In July 2014, Blum discussed his involvement with the film, "After Ethan [Hawke] and I did Sinister and The Purge, he really, really wanted to do a Western ... It took about a year to find In a Valley of Violence ... which is Ti West's movie." He added that what drew him to the project was his love of West's approach to filmmaking. In March 2016, West revealed in an interview he had written the role with Hawke in mind.

On March 18, 2014, The Hollywood Reporter announced that the film would star John Travolta and Ethan Hawke in main roles, with Hawke portraying the film's protagonist Paul, and Travolta portraying the Marshal Clyde Martin, who has a wooden leg. On May 22, 2014, Deadline Hollywood reported that Taissa Farmiga had been cast as Mary-Anne, a young innkeeper. The following day, Karen Gillan was cast as Ellen, the sister of Farmiga's character. On June 3, 2014, it was announced that James Ransone had been cast in the final main role of Deputy Gilly Martin, the fiancé of Ellen and the son of the Marshal.

While promoting the film, West spoke about finding a "talented" dog to fill the role of Abbie, Paul's canine companion. The part was given to Jumpy, whose trainer, Omar von Muller, also trained Uggie, the late star of The Artist (2011).

=== Filming ===
Principal photography for the project began on June 23, 2014, in Santa Fe, New Mexico, and lasted approximately five weeks, 25 days in total. The film was shot on 35mm film. A makeshift Western town was built at Cerro Pelon Ranch in Galisteo, New Mexico for the duration of production and was used as the primary location for filming. The elaborate set consisted of a saloon, ramshackle houses, train tracks and a feed-and-seed store. The film's cinematographer, Eric Robbins, revealed that since they were shooting on film, footage wouldn't be seen for several days. Travolta finished filming his scenes on July 16, 2014. Gillan wrapped her scenes on July 18, and Farmiga completed her scenes the following day, on July 19, 2014. On July 26, 2014, Ti West announced on his Twitter account that principal photography for the film had concluded.

=== Post-production ===
West edited the film in Burbank, California. On September 8, 2014, West appeared on Bret Easton Ellis' podcast and discussed the filming process of In a Valley of Violence, stating, "It's a Western from the first shot, so I'm really interested to hear people calling it slow burn ... It's a Western from frame one to the end frame, so there's no 'and then it became a Western' – it's always a Western. And that's kind of refreshing for me to make. It's just been artistically a pleasure to do." On April 22, 2015, a raw cut of the film was test screened at the ArcLight cinema in Pasadena, California. In late September 2015, West stated on his official Twitter account that the film was in the final stages of post-production.

== Soundtrack ==
In a Valley of Violence: Original Motion Picture Soundtrack

Soundtrack album by Jeff Grace
- Released: October 21, 2016
- Genre: Score
- Length: 46:39
- Label: Back Lot Music

On January 12, 2015, it was announced that composer Jeff Grace had been hired to write the musical score for the film, marking the fourth time Grace has scored for Ti West, having previously composed music for three of West's feature films: Trigger Man (2007), The House of the Devil (2009), and The Innkeepers (2011). The soundtrack album, featuring Grace's original score, was released via digital download by Back Lot Music on the same day as the film's theatrical and VOD release: October 21, 2016.

Track listing
No.	Title	Length
1.	"Priests and Sinners"	6:10
2.	"Opening Titles"	1:59
3.	"To Denton"	3:44
4.	"Gilly"	5:09
5.	"Leaving Town"	3:05
6.	"Finding Abbie"	3:23
7.	"Homestead"	4:39
8.	"Hesitation Will Get You Killed"	3:21
9.	"Returning To Town"	2:58
10.	"Rooftop"	4:10
11.	"Surrender and Standoff"	2:55
12.	"Marshal's Goodbye"	2:37
13.	"Ending"	2:29
Total length:		46:39

== Distribution ==
=== Marketing ===
On August 17, 2015, the first still image from the film was released in black and white, featuring Ethan Hawke riding a horse. Two more images were released on February 25, 2016, along with a more detailed plot synopsis. In March 2016, the first poster for the film was released by Entertainment Weekly, shortly before its world premiere. The first clip from the film, featuring Hawke and Travolta, was released in July 2016, ahead of its screening at the Fantasia International Film Festival. The official trailer debuted on Entertainment Weekly's website on July 19, 2016.

=== Release ===
In a Valley of Violence had its world premiere as a headlining film at South by Southwest on March 12, 2016. The film screened at the Chicago Critics Film Festival on May 25, 2016, followed by a Q&A with West, and the Seattle International Film Festival on May 28, 2016. Prior to its premiere, Focus World acquired U.S. distribution rights to the film, with Universal Pictures set to distribute internationally.

The film was released in the United States, in a limited release and through video on demand, on October 21, 2016. It was initially reported that the film would be released on September 16.

=== Home media ===
In a Valley of Violence was released on DVD and Blu-ray by Universal Pictures Home Entertainment on December 27, 2016, with special features including a behind-the-scenes look at the making of the film. The film was released for streaming on Netflix in October 2020.

== Reception ==
=== Box office ===
In a Valley of Violence was released to 33 theaters across the United States on October 21, 2016, and made $10,722 in its first day of release. In its opening weekend, the film made $29,343, for a per theater average of $889. Overall, the film made $61,797 in the United States, taking $44,738 in its first week, and $17,059 in its second and final week of release.

=== Critical response ===
The film received positive reviews from critics. On review aggregation website Rotten Tomatoes, it received a 78% approval rating, based on 73 reviews, with a weighted average of 6.8/10. The critical consensus reads, "In a Valley of Violence offers a smartly conceived homage to classic Westerns that transcends pastiche with absurdist humor and a terrific cast." Metacritic reports a score of 64 out of 100, based on 20 reviews, indicating "generally favorable" reviews.

Andrew Barker for Variety wrote, "Stripping its gunslinger plot down to the most essential pillars, the film has plenty of incidental pleasures to offer: a few chuckles, some typically Westian explosions of violence, a deliriously fun score, and a pair of perfectly solid performances from Ethan Hawke and John Travolta." John DeFore of The Hollywood Reporter, who in his review praised the performance of Hawke but found Travolta miscast, wrote of the film, "A genre revival that's always enjoyable, even when suffering a minor personality crisis near the end." Bill Goodykoontz of the Chicago Sun-Times awarded the film 3 out of 5 stars, writing, "... what makes In a Valley of Violence a notch better than a simple genre exercise is West's sense of fun. Occasionally he overindulges it, but it serves the film well."
