= Blue Light Theater Company =

Former off-Broadway theater company

- Type: Theatre group
- Purpose: Off-Broadway theatre
- Location: New York City, New York, United States

The Blue Light Theater Company was an off-Broadway theater company located in New York City primarily active in the late 1990s through 2001 and notable for the many celebrated actors associated with the company, including Joanne Woodward, Paul Newman, Frances McDormand, Billy Crudup, Marisa Tomei, and Marsha Mason, as well as many who have since gone on to have notable careers including Josh Radnor, T.R. Knight, Chris Messina, and Matthew Saldivar. Actor/ Artistic-Director Greg Naughton (also a singer-songwriter with The Sweet Remains), and Darice O'Mara, Assistant to Paul Newman, founded Blue Light in 1995 with the stated mission of producing challenging, primarily larger-cast plays that would bring up-and-coming actors together with veteran artists in a spirit of apprenticeship. They began as an itinerant theater troupe, renting theaters from such venues as Primary Stages, HERE Arts Center, the Classic Stage Company, and Atlantic Theatre Company, before settling in for two seasons at the 55th Street Theatre (now the Women's Project Theater) and their final two seasons in the McGinn-Cazale Theatre. Mandy Greenfield (later the artistic producer of Manhattan Theatre Club and artistic director of Williamstown Theatre Festival) joined as Blue Light’s producing manager in 1998. She and Peter Manning (formerly producer of New York Stage and Film) are credited with the artistic direction and selection of Blue Light’s final season, when Mr. Naughton took a sabbatical.

== History ==
The Blue Light Theater Company initially gained attention from revivals of Clifford Odets's Golden Boy (starring James Naughton and Greg Naughton) and Waiting for Lefty (starring Marisa Tomei), both directed by Joanne Woodward (wife of the late Paul Newman). Other revivals included Eduardo De Filippo's Filumena (adapted by Maria Tucci) and Anton Chekhov's The Seagull (directed by Austin Pendleton). The troupe transitioned to performing works by contemporary playwrights, such as the Michael Cristofer drama Amazing Grace, as well as the 1999 New York premiere of Philip Ridley's The Pitchfork Disney. Other productions include Jessica Goldberg's The Hologram Theory, the New York premiere of Daniel Goldfarb's Adam Baum and the Jew Movie, a revival of Philip Barry's Hotel Universe, and Darko Tresnjak's Princess Turandot. Blue Light produced six seasons and 16 main productions under an Equity Off Broadway Letter of Agreement contract before suspending its operations in 2001.

Greg Naughton and Joe Grifasi in "Golden Boy", 1995

== Awards ==
In 1998, the Blue Light Theater Co. staged playwright and director Dare Clubb's modern adaptation of Oedipus (starring Frances McDormand and Billy Crudup), which won an Obie Award for playwrighting.

== Productions ==
- Dogg's Hamlet, Cahoot's Macbeth (1994), Tom Stoppard
  - Directed by B.H.Barry
  - Cast: John Ellison Conlee, Andy Taylor, Robin Weigert, James Matthew Ryan, Kevin Crawford, Kelly Deadmon, Donna Jean Fogel, Trevor Moran, Vernon Morris, Greg Naughton, Jon Rothstein, Stephen Thirolle
- Golden Boy (1995), Clifford Odets
  - Directed by Joanne Woodward
  - Cast including: James Naughton (Tom Moody), Angie Phillips (Lorna Moon), Greg Naughton (Joe Bonaparte), Joe Grifasi (Tokio), Yusef Bulos (Mr. Carp), Peter Gregory (Siggie), Spiro Malas (Mr. Bonaparte), Emily Wachtel (Anna), James Matthew Ryan (Frank Bonaparte), Lee Wilkof (Roxy Gottlieb), Bruce MacVittie (Eddie Fuseli), P .J. Brown (Pepper White, Drake and Driscoll), Alex Draper (Mickey, Lewis and Barker) and Jon Rothstein (Sam and Call Boy)
- Scenes from an Execution (1996), Howard Barker
  - Directed by Richard Romagnoli
  - Cast including: Naomi Jacobson (Galactia), Greg Naughton (Carpeta), Alex Draper (Urgentino), James Slaughter (Suffici), Francesca Di Mauro (Gina Rivera), Alan Wade (Prodo), Elizabeth Swain (The Sketchbook), Donna Jean Fogel (Supporta), Aidan Sullivan (Dementia), James Matthew Ryan (Sordo), Jon Sherman (Lasagna, Jailer and Man from the Piave), Jon Rothstein (Second Sailor and Workman) and Nick Toren (Pastaccio, First Sailor and Priest)
- Treasure Island (1996), Robert Louis Stevenson, adapted by B.H. Barry
  - Directed by B.H. Barry
  - Cast including: Charlie Hofheimer (Jim), Vernon Morris, Patrick Boll, Larry Pine
- Two Gentlemen of Verona (1997), William Shakespeare
  - Directed by Dylan Baker
  - Cast including: Vivienne Benesch (Julia), Camilia Sanes (Sylvia ), Greg Naughton (Proteus), Talmadge Lowe (Valentine), Matthew Saldivar (Thurio), Joe Grifasi (Launce), Larry Nathanson (Speed)
- Filumena: A Marriage Italian Style (1997), Eduardo De Fillipo, adapt. by Maria Tucci
  - Cast including: Tony Amendola, Joe Grifasi, Maria Tucci, Mary Fogarty, Melissa Bowen, Greg Naughton, Lenny Venito, Matt Saldivar, Dana Bledsoe and Rik Colitti
- Waiting for Lefty (1997), Clifford Odets
  - Directed by Joanne Woodward
  - Cast including: Marisa Tomei, Wood Harris, Peter Jacobson, Robert Hogan, Jerry Mayer, PJ Brown, Greg Naughton, Lee Wilkof, Scott Whitehurst, Lisa Renee Pitts, Bernie Sheredy, Alex Draper, Allen K. Bernstein, Kurt Elftmann, Gregory Vaughn Ward, Christopher Peterson
- Oedipus (1998), adapt. by Dare Clubb (World Premiere)
  - Directed by Dare Clubb
  - Cast including: Frances McDormand, Billy Crudup, Johanna Day, Jeffrey Donovan, Lawrence Nathanson, Jon De Vries, Camilia Sanes, Kevin Geer, Alan Tudyk, Alex Draper, Jonathan Fried, Carolyn McCormick
- The Seagull (1998), Anton Chekhov, adapt. by Tom Stoppard
  - Directed by Austin Pendleton
  - Cast including: Angie Phillips, Maria Tucci, Mark Blum, Greg Naughton, Alex Draper, Francesca di Mauro, Bill Striglos, Molly Regan, Joe Ponazecki, Tom Brennan, Rainard Rachele
- Amazing Grace (1998), Michael Cristofer (NY Premier)
  - Directed by Edward Gilbert
  - Cast including: Marsha Mason, Carlin Glynn, Bethel Leslie, Stephen C. Bradbury, Adina Porter, Marsha Dietlin, Jerry Mayer, Anthony Lamont
- The Pitchfork Disney (1999), Philip Ridley
  - Directed by Rob Bundy
  - Cast including: Gabriel Macht, Alex Kilgore, Alex Draper, Lynn Hawley and Brandt Johnson
- The Clearing (1999), Helen Edmundson
  - Directed by Tracy Brigden
  - Cast including: Patricia Dunnock (Killaine Farrell), Simon Brooking (Pierce Kinsellagh), Joseph Costa (Solomon Winter), Michael Countryman (Robert Preston), Alyssa Bresnahan (Madeleine Preston), Sam Catlin (Sir Charles Sturman) and Steve Juergens
- Adam Baum and the Jew Movie (1999), Daniel Goldfarb
  - Directed by Brian Kulick
  - Cast including: Ron Leibman (Samuel Baum), Christopher Evan Welch (Garfield Hampson Jr.), and Adam Lamberg (Adam Baum)
- The Hologram Theory (2000), Jessica Goldberg
  - Directed by Ruben Polendo
  - Cast including: T. R. Knight (Tweety), Chris Messina (Joe Buck), Daniel Bess (Julian), Joie Susannah Lee (Patsy), Kellie Overbey (Sara), Michael Alexis Palmer (Dominic), Jennifer Rau (Ritah), Elizabeth Reaser (Mimi), Corey Stoll (Greg) and Bill Torres (Simon)
- Hotel Universe (2000), Philip Barry
  - Directed by Darko Tresnjak
  - Cast including: Richard Easton (Stephen Field), Arija Bareikis (Ann Field), Cheryl Lynn Bowers (Alice Kendall), Liam Craig (Tom Ames), Keira Naughton (Hope Ames), Gregor Paslawsky (Felix), Kali Rocha (Lily Malone), Armand Schultz (Norman Rose) and Adam Stein (Pat Farley)
- Princess Turandot (2001), Darko Tresnjak
  - Directed by Darko Tresnjak
  - Cast including: Josh Radnor (Brighella), Jeffrey Binder (Pantalone), Crispin Freeman (Altoum), Roxanna Hope (Princess Turandot), Christopher K. Morgan (Executioner), Gregor Paslawsky (Barach), Susan Pourfar (Zelina, Queen Almaze), Maria Elena Ramirez (Adelma), James Stanley (Prince Calaf) and Andrew Weems (Truffaldino and Ishmael)
