= Jocelin Donahue =

American actress

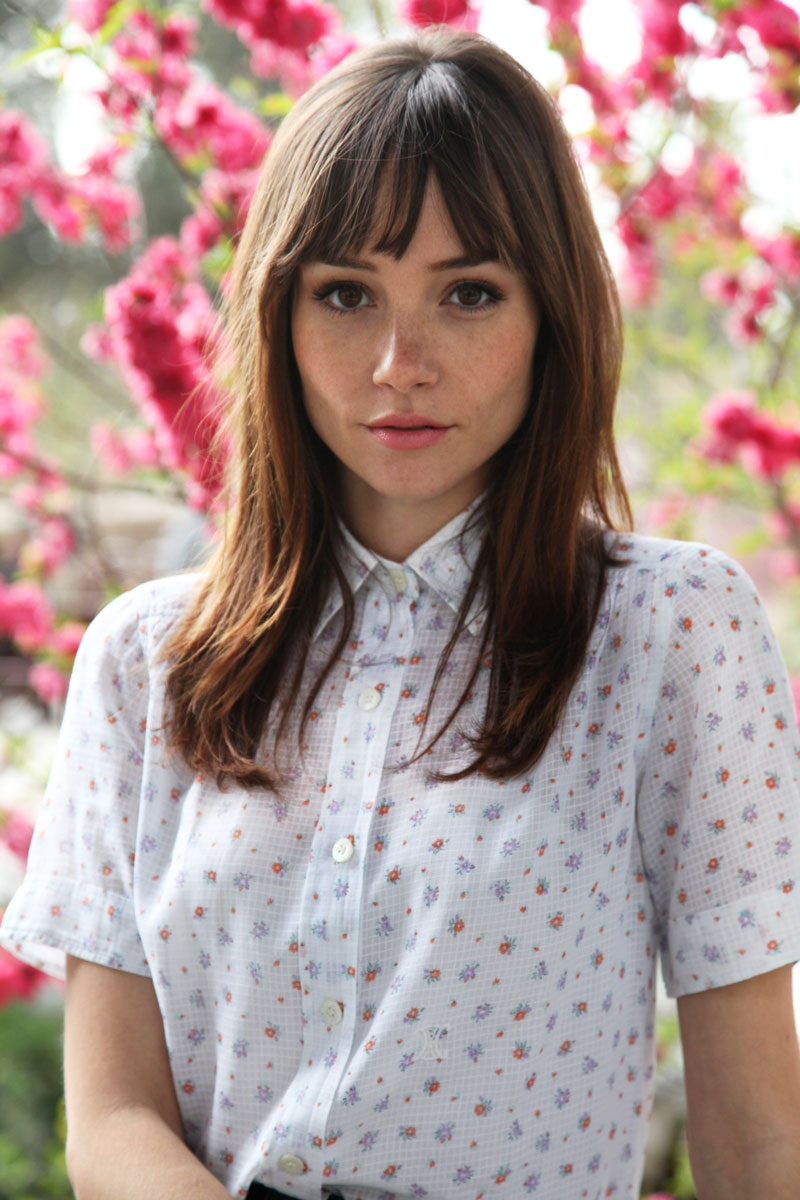
- Donahue in 2017
- Born: November 8, 1981 (age 44); Bristol, Connecticut, U.S.
- Education: New York University
- Occupation: Actress
- Years active: 2006–present

Jocelin Donahue (born November 8, 1981) is an American actress. She played the lead role in Ti West's critically acclaimed horror film The House of the Devil, winning Best Actress at the 2009 LA Screamfest, and young version of Barbara Hershey's character in Insidious: Chapter 2. In 2015 Donahue starred in the crime thriller The Frontier, appeared in the 2019 film Doctor Sleep, and starred in the 2023 film The Last Stop in Yuma County.

== Early life ==
Donahue was born and raised in Bristol, Connecticut, and graduated from Bristol Central High School in 1999. After high school, she attended New York University, where she earned a degree in sociology.

== Career ==
After a supporting role in the Western horror film The Burrowers (2008), Donahue was cast as the lead in The House of the Devil in 2009. She went on to play leading roles in The Last Godfather by Korean filmmaker Shim Hyung-rae, and in the independent film Live at the Foxes Den. In 2012 she appeared in The End of Love, and worked with director Terrence Malick on Knight of Cups. In 2016 she appeared in a segment of the anthology horror film Holidays (2016).

As an actress in commercials, she has appeared in numerous national campaigns, including ads for Levi's, Zune, Vitamin Water, Apple, Subway, and Mercedes-Benz.

== Filmography ==
=== Film ===
Year	Title	Role	Notes
2008	The Burrowers	Maryanne Stewart	
2009	He's Just Not That Into You	Cute Girl	
2009	The House of the Devil	Samantha "Sam" Hughes	Screamfest Award for Best Actress
2010	Wes and Ella	Ella	
2010	The Last Godfather	Nancy Bonfante	
2012	The End of Love	Jocelin	
2012	Free Samples	Paula	
2013	Insidious: Chapter 2	young Lorraine Lambert	
2013	Live at the Foxes Den	Kat	
2014	The Living	Molly	
2014	Knight of Cups	Jocelin	
2015	The Frontier	Laine	
2015	Furious 7	Advisor	
2015	Midnight Sex Run	Jennifer Peters	
2015	Summer Camp	Christy	
2016	Holidays	Carol	
2016	Dead Awake	Beth / Kate Bowman	
2017	Boomtown	Emma Turner	
2017	20 Weeks	Eileen	
2018	All the Creatures Were Stirring	Alissa	
2019	I Trapped the Devil	Sarah	
2019	Doctor Sleep	Lucia "Lucy" Stone (née Reynolds)	
2022	Offseason	Marie Aldrich	
2023	The Last Stop in Yuma County	Charlotte Cadell	

=== Television ===
Year	Title	Role	Notes
2007	Not Another High School Show	Melissa	Television film
2007	Dirty Sexy Money	Hostess	Episode: "The Country House"
2010	CSI: Crime Scene Investigation	Jillian Rose	Episode: "Sin City Blue"
2016	StartUp	Maddie Pierce	Main role
2017	Lethal Weapon	Kate	Episode: "Homebodies"
2019	The Affair	Anna	Episode: #5.10

=== Music videos ===
Year	Title	Band	Notes
2005	Live Today Again	Idaho	

=== Video games ===
Year	Title	Role	Notes
2022	Immortality	Amy Archer	

=== Commercials ===
Year	Title	Role	Notes
2012	Subway	Sally	
