= The Innkeepers =

The Innkeepers can mean:

- Episode 47/23 of the television series Frasier
- The Innkeepers (film), a horror film written, directed and edited by Ti West

== See also ==
- Innkeeper
