= Wil Horneff =

American actor (born 1979)

- Born: William Samuel Horneff; June 12, 1979 (age 47); Englewood, New Jersey, U.S.
- Education: Columbia University
- Occupations: Child actor, martial artist
- Years active: 1992–2014
- Spouse: Alisha Dalgewicz (m. 2008)

William Samuel Horneff (born June 12, 1979) is an American former child actor and martial artist who won two Young Artist Awards from three nominations. After leaving his career as an actor, Horneff opened Training Grounds Jiu-Jitsu & MMA, where he teaches Brazilian jiu-jitsu.

== Early life ==
Horneff was born in Englewood, New Jersey, the eldest of four children of Robin, a choreographer, dancer, and teacher, and Van Horneff, a pistachio farmer, talent manager, race car driver, and real estate developer. His parents owned the Robin Horneff Performing Arts Center in Waldwick, New Jersey, and his father also owns a gymnastics mat business. He grew up in Saddle River, New Jersey and attended Bergen Catholic High School in Oradell, New Jersey. Horneff began acting professionally in 1992 at the age of thirteen. He made his Broadway debut in John Guare's Four Baboons Adoring The Sun opposite Stockard Channing and James Naughton.

== Career ==
His first film appearance was a relatively minor role in the cult film The Sandlot as Phillips, the arch-rival of the title characters. This was soon followed by an appearance in the TV series Law & Order, as well as leading roles in films such as Ghost in the Machine and Born to Be Wild.

In 1995, he won the Young Artist Award as Best Young Leading Actor in a Made for TV Movie for his role as Jody Baxter in The Yearling and won the Young Artist Award the following year as Best Young Leading Actor in a Feature Film for his role as Rick Heller in Born to Be Wild.

After several other television and film appearances, most notably the acclaimed Emmy Award-winning mini-series Oldest Living Confederate Widow Tells All, he temporarily left acting to finish high school and later to attend Columbia University in New York City where he received his degree in English.

He also travelled extensively during this time, visiting France, Spain and Germany. His family often visit relatives in Europe, which has allowed him to learn to speak both French and German fluently. He also spent several months in Russia, helping underprivileged children in and around Kostroma.

In 2002, he made his acting comeback with a second guest appearance in the TV series Law & Order. Since then, he has appeared in numerous different TV series' such as The Handler, CSI: NY, and House, in addition to several horror films such as The Roost. He currently resides in New Jersey.

Outside of acting, he is a keen athlete, having competed in three events in the Junior Olympics when he was younger. His hobbies include tennis, basketball, karate (in which he has a black belt), skiing, rock-climbing, Brazilian Jiu-Jitsu (in which he is a black belt), and flying. He took flying lessons at fourteen years old and obtained a pilot's license several years later.

He also owns and operates Training Grounds Jiu-Jitsu & MMA in Westwood, New Jersey. He's won several prestigious Brazilian Jiu Jitsu and Submission Grappling titles, such as the Pan American Championships and the U.S Open.

== Filmography ==
Year	Title	Role	Notes
1992	Ghostwriter	Calvin Ferguson	2 episodes
1993	The Sandlot	Phillips	
1993	Ghost in the Machine	Josh Munroe	
1993-2002	Law & Order	Chris Pollit/Mousah Salim/Greg Landen	2 episodes
1994	The Yearling	Jody Baxter	TV movie
1994	Oldest Living Confederate Widow Tells All	Willie Marsden	TV movie
1995	Born to Be Wild	Rick Heller	
1997	The Shining	Tony/Adult Danny	Miniseries
1998	Harvest	Andy Yates	
1999	2 Little, 2 Late	Robbie Fontaine	
2004	The Handler	Danny Fitzpatrick	Episode: Wedding Party
2005	The Roost	Elliot	
2005	Alchemy	Dave	
2005	CSI: NY	Dennis Sporco	Episode: What You See Is What You See
2005	House	Taddy	Episode: Daddy's Boy
2007	Dead Tone	Scott/Josh	
2007	A Dance for Bethany	Eric	
2014	The Longest Swim	Matt	
