= Trigger Man =

Trigger Man or Triggerman may refer to one of the following:

- Trigger Man (video game), a 2004 third-person shooter video game
- Triggerman (film), a 1948 Western
- Trigger Man (2007 film), a 2007 film thriller
- Allan Caidic, basketball player, nicknamed The Triggerman
- Triggerman (beat), a specific collection of samples and beats, which forms the foundation of the bounce style of hip hop
