= Cerro Pelon Ranch =

- Location in the United States
- Coordinates: 35°22′18.99″N 105°56′58.18″W
- Country: United States
- State: New Mexico
- County: Santa Fe

Cerro Pelon Ranch (originally called the Cook Ranch, and later the Cook Movie Ranch) is a large ranch estate in Santa Fe County, New Mexico. About thirty Hollywood productions have been filmed there, including Silverado, Lonesome Dove, Wild Wild West, 3:10 to Yuma, and Thor. The film set originally constructed on the property for Silverado has been expanded and revised for each succeeding production.

Contrasting the old-fashioned appearance of these sets, the property is noted for ultramodern houses and facilities built there after its purchase in 2001 by fashion designer Tom Ford. These include a horse facility designed by noted architect Tadao Ando and implemented by the architecture firm of Marmol Radziner as executive architect and general contractor of the project, and a number of other buildings and facilities designed and built by Marmol Radziner.

== Location and geography ==
The ranch occupies 20,662 acres in the Galisteo Basin, twenty-four miles south and east of Santa Fe, and just over a mile from the village of Galisteo, in Santa Fe County. The property has views of the Sangre de Cristo Mountains, Sandia Mountains, Jemez Mountains, and Ortiz Mountains. The Galisteo River runs through it. The property is "distinguished by lush savanna grasslands, dramatic topography and a rich cultural history", containing "[p]etroglyphs, pictographs, pottery shards and [Puebloan ancestral dwellings]". It is part of a cluster of ranches in the area that are "[t]he most popular western filming location in New Mexico".

== History ==
=== Silverado set construction ===
Although the ranch had appeared in a few movie scenes as early as 1970, it "became a very important movie location in 1984 when a western town was built as the primary setting for Lawrence Kasdan's Silverado". Seattle-born Montana rancher Bill Cook, with his wife Marian, purchased the property as one of several ranches Cook owned in New Mexico and Arizona, and preserved the location's wide-open vistas through "judicious placement of roads and inconspicuous fencing". Lawrence and Mark Kasdan and their crew scouted a remote area of New Mexico by helicopter, hoping to find the most suitable place to build the town of Silverado.

The location manager appeared at the Cook property. At that time the filmmakers wanted to build only two to three structures, offering Cook a "casual number" as a location fee. "There wasn't any great motivation for me one way or another, but I said okay. It just grew from that into a big budget movie and the Silverado set was built", Cook recalled. The set was appropriately dressed and filmed for towns in four different states, depending on the view from the streets—mountains or prairie or the Galisteo River. The Silverado set included 38 storefronts, a church, and two buildings with working interiors for indoor filming—the saloon, and the sheriff's office and jail.

The presence of this large set thereafter brought steady production to the ranch and the surrounding area. For some films, only a few scenes were shot at the ranch. For others, such as Silverado and Wyatt Earp, virtually the entire film was made there. Originally known as the Cook Ranch, in 1999 the property came to be referred to as Cerro Pelon, literally meaning "Bald Hill", "after a fire started by carelessly used pyrotechnics during the filming of Wild Wild West", which "raged out of control in the New Mexico wind". The fire destroyed the film set, which was completely rebuilt.

=== Tom Ford purchase and redesign ===
Fashion designer Tom Ford acquired the property in 2001, and officially changed the name to Cerro Pelon Ranch. To build on the property, Ford brought in "Pritzker Prize-winning self-taught Japanese architect Tadao Ando with construction overseen by the vaunted American firm of Marmol Radziner". Ford had previously hired Marmol Radziner to remodel the Holmby Hills, Los Angeles estate of Betsy Bloomingdale.

The primary private area built during this effort added "an ultramodern main residence" designed by Ando and built by Marmol Radziner, with the firm being "responsible for the entire property's construction". The main residence is "an extraordinarily long, land-hugging ultra-minimalist concrete and glass pavilion that appears to float on a shallow, lake-sized reflecting pool". Also built in the vicinity of the main house were "two guesthouses set privately away from the main residence", as well as four separate staff buildings, an eight-stall horse barn, indoor and outdoor circular riding rings, and a fenced tennis court.

A second compound on the property, also designed and built by Marmol Radziner, contains the headquarters of the ranch manager, including "[a] sophisticated home, a professional detached office building, and ample horse facilities", along with additional staff residences, warehouse facilities, and an airstrip and hangar.

=== 3:10 to Yuma expansion ===
In 2007, during the filming of 3:10 to Yuma, a substantial number of buildings were added to the movie set. After filming concluded, the owners of the Cerro Pelon Ranch petitioned to keep the $2 million expansion, which was initially supposed to be dismantled within 90 days. At that time, sets constructed for 3:10 to Yuma made up 75% of the overall sets on the ranch. In April 2007, the county's development review committee granted the request to keep the expansion, which would potentially generate revenue in the future.

Although most film productions at the ranch have been traditional westerns, 2011 saw the filming of a comic book movie, the Marvel Cinematic Universe film Thor. The set was expanded again for the 2016 filming of In a Valley of Violence, for which director Ti West explained that Western movie sets "kind of get cannibalized — another movie will come in and knock down buildings and put up a new church".

In 2016, Ford put Cerro Pelon Ranch on the market, at a price of $75 million, In late 2019, the property still unsold, Ford reduced the asking price to $48 million. The property was sold to an unnamed buyer in 2021.

== Films and TV programs ==
Films and TV programs with scenes shot at Cerro Pelon Ranch include: (Note: Unless otherwise noted, all films and TV programs are sourced to Carlo Gaberscek and Kenny Stier, In Search of Western Movie Sites (2014), p. 80-84.)

- The Cheyenne Social Club (1970)
- Santee (1973)
- Silverado (1985)
- The Gambler, Part III: The Legend Continues (1987)
- Longarm (1988)
- The Return of Desperado (1988)
- Lonesome Dove (1989)
- Young Guns II (1990)
- Into the Badlands (1991)
- Gunsmoke: The Long Ride (1993)
- The Last Outlaw (1993)
- Lightning Jack (1993)
- Buffalo Girls (1994)
- Wyatt Earp (1994)
- East Meets West (1995)
- Last Man Standing (1995)
- The Lazarus Man (1995-96)
- Walker, Texas Ranger (1998)
- The Hi-Lo Country (1998)
- Wild Wild West (1999)
- The Missing (2003)
- Into the West (2005)
- The Far Side of Jericho (2006)
- Appaloosa (2007)
- 3:10 to Yuma (2007)
- Comanche Moon (2008)
- Doc West (2009)
- Cowboys & Aliens (2011)
- Thor (2011)
- The Ridiculous 6 (2015)
- In a Valley of Violence (2016)
- Godless (2017)
