= Karl Jacob =

American actor and filmmaker (born 1979)

- Born: Karl Jacob Wiiliainen; January 20, 1979 (age 47); Hibbing, Minnesota, U.S.
- Education: McNally Smith College of Music
- Occupations: Actor; director; producer; screenwriter; editor
- Years active: 2002–present

Karl Jacob (born January 20, 1979) is an American actor and filmmaker known for writing and directing the feature films Pollywogs and Cold November, as well as producing the Onur Tukel film Applesauce.

== Personal life ==
Karl Jacob was born and raised in Hibbing, Minnesota. He moved to Minneapolis and attended McNally Smith College of Music (known then as Musictech College) and later moved to New York to pursue acting. He currently resides in North Carolina.

== Filmography ==
Year	Title	Notes
2013	Pollywogs	Narrative Feature
2018	Cold November	Narrative Feature

=== Actor ===
Year	Title	Role	Director
2005	The Roost	Trevor	Ti West
2007-09	Young American Bodies	Ted	Joe Swanberg
2011	The Dictator	Aladeen Double	Larry Charles
2013	Pollywogs	Dylan	Karl Jacob
2015	Freeheld	Jeeter	Peter Sollett
2018	Cold November	Uncle Craig	Karl Jacob

== Awards ==
Cold November received the Grand Jury award for Best Narrative Feature at the IndieMemphis Film Festival in 2017.
