= Yankee Pedlar Inn =

Historic hotel located in Torrington, Connecticut, USA

Coordinates: 41.80241°N 73.12167°W

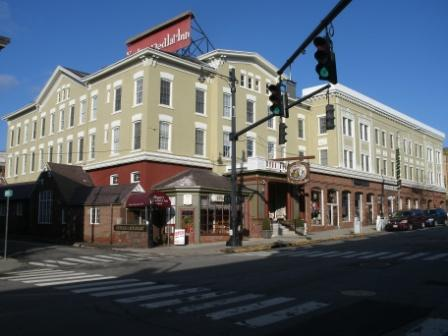
The Yankee Pedlar Inn on the corner of Main Street and Maiden Lane in Torrington, Connecticut.

The Yankee Pedlar Inn is a historic hotel located in Torrington, Connecticut, US. The inn, which now has 52 rooms, was built for its original owners, Frank and Alice Conley, in 1891. It was originally given a colonial New England architectural style.

The inn closed on 1 December 2015 for extensive renovations, which were expected to take 7–9 months to complete but subsequently stalled due to lack of funds. In September 2017, the property owner, Jayson Hospitality, said renovations would begin again that fall. "Residents and visitors will begin to see improvements to the beloved Yankee Pedlar this fall along with an anticipated re-open in the spring of 2018 under the umbrella of a Best Western Plus," a press release said.

However, the inn never reopened and Jayson Hospitality was sued by the city of Torrington in order to reobtain the property. Jayson Hospitality gutted the building after it purchased it. Eventually, the city and the company came to an agreement that it must start work on its renovation project again in February 2024.

== History ==
In November 1890, Frank Conley bought a 100 ft (30 m) by 214 ft (65 m) lot on the corner of Main Street and Maiden Lane for $8,000. His wife, Alice, was a native of New England while he had immigrated to the United States from Ireland.

The couple used $40,000 to open the Conley Hotel. Alice was the manager while Frank worked as the hotel's operator. Throughout much of the first half of the 20th century, it was managed as a family business.

After the couple died, the hotel was taken over by their niece. It was later expanded and renovated after it was sold by the Conley family. Since then the inn has had many managers, owners, and employees including: Albert E.Rubens, Arthur Rubens, Carlo Pilatti, Alfred B. Siegrist and E.J. Kovak.

The business did not receive its name "The Yankee Pedlar Inn" until 1 March 1956, when the hotel was combined with the restaurant. Along with the restaurant, the hotel also has a pub called Bogey's.

== Paranormal activity ==
The Yankee Pedlar Inn is notable for having many associations with the supernatural, particularly hauntings in various rooms of the establishment. One of the inn's most haunted rooms is supposed to be room 353, where Alice Conley, the original owner, died.

Due to the notoriety of the inn, the filmmaker Ti West shot the horror film The Innkeepers at the hotel. The film was based entirely around the inn's supposed paranormal activity.

== Bibliography ==
- Dunne, Susan (March 1, 2012). "Horror Film Shot In Torrington Playing At Real Art Ways". Hartford Courant.
- "Yankee Pedlar Inn – Torrington, Ct". CPEAR CT Paranormal Encounters and Research. February 17, 2013. Archived from the original on August 26, 2011.
- Z, John (February 17, 2013). "The Yankee Pedlar Inn – Torrington, CT". Archived from the original on April 5, 2012.
