= The Frontier (2015 film) =

- Directed by: Oren Shai
- Written by: Oren Shai; Webb Wilcoxen
- Produced by: Dana Lustig
- Starring: Jocelin Donahue; Kelly Lynch; Jim Beaver; Izabella Miko; Jamie Harris; Liam Aiken; A. J. Bowen
- Cinematography: Jay Keitel
- Edited by: Humphrey Dixon; Oren Shai
- Music by: Ali Helnwein
- Production companies: Rocking Films; Dana Lustig Productions
- Distributed by: Kino Lorber
- Release date: March 15, 2015 (SXSW)
- Running time: 88 minutes
- Country: United States
- Language: English

The Frontier is a 2015 American crime film directed by Oren Shai and written by Oren Shai and Webb Wilcoxen. The film stars Jocelin Donahue, Kelly Lynch, Jim Beaver, Izabella Miko, Jamie Harris, Liam Aiken, and A. J. Bowen. Donahue plays a drifter on the run who stops at a motel, only to find that several people there may be involved in a local heist.

== Plot ==
Laine, a drifter, falls asleep in her car at a motel's parking lot. In the morning, she hides a personalized money clip and meets the owner, Luanne, who gives Laine a free meal. A local police officer, Gault, explains a brutal murder has occurred in nearby Flagstaff while he changes Laine's flat tire. As a favor, Laine fixes Gault a coffee for Luanne. On Gault's recommendation, Luanne offers Laine a job as a waitress at the motel's diner. Laine turns it down and requests a free room for the night, instead. Although offended her offer was rejected, Luanne agrees. Before going to sleep, Laine sneaks into the adjoining room. As Laine steals a necklace and a bottle of sedatives, the couple staying there returns to their room. Laine hides in the closet, where she overhears them discuss a completed heist.

Convinced the drop-off will happen at the motel, Laine apologizes to Luanne and requests a job. When Luanne hesitates, Laine indicates she will return to an abusive boyfriend, and Luanne hires her. At the diner, Laine meets the current guests: Lee, a taciturn man; Flynn and Gloria, the couple from the neighboring room; and Eddie, Gloria's younger brother. When Gloria becomes flustered and announces her necklace has been stolen, the other guests quickly attempt to calm her before Gault intervenes. Also worried about being discovered, Laine slips away and returns the necklace. Before leaving, Gault flirts with Laine, who bluntly rejects him. Gault retaliates by slashing her tires.

Laine practices putting the sedative in a customer's drink, knocking him out. That night, Flynn and Gloria get drunk to celebrate their coming fortune, and Laine attempts to slip sedatives into their drinks. Lee returns to the diner and becomes enraged when he sees Flynn, Gloria, and Eddie partying noisily. After taking a phone call, he orders Laine to leave the diner. She refuses, and he beats her, demanding to know who she really is. Luanne returns to the diner and objects, but Lee only stops when Laine admits to killing a man in Flagstaff who had attempted to rape her. She retrieves the hidden money clip, which Lee recognizes as belonging to the murder victim, a prominent politician. Convinced she can not go to the police, Lee allows her to live, and Luanne talks him into giving Laine a small cut of the heist.

All return to the diner, and Laine serves them coffee spiked with sedatives. Eddie declines to drink the coffee, but gets a smaller dose from the alcohol Laine previously drugged. Once all have fallen unconscious, Laine drags them out of sight. Before the courier arrives, Gault returns and apologizes for his earlier behavior. While flirting with him, Laine attempts to serve Gault coffee, but he declines. Shortly after Gault leaves, a courier delivers the money, and Laine attempts to flee. Eddie wakes up and knocks her unconscious, leaving with the money himself. Laine accuses Eddie of drugging them and running off with the money. Dubious, Lee insists she accompany them in pursuit of Eddie.

They find Eddie's car flipped over on the side of the road. After following his bloody tracks, Lee confronts Eddie. Gloria rushes to defend her brother, and Lee kills both of them. Luanne eagerly grabs Gloria's necklace and puts it on. Lee forces Laine to help him put the bodies in the trunk, where, much to their surprise, they discover the courier's body; they assume it to be Eddie's work. Grieving, Flynn shoots Lee and attacks Luanne. Laine retrieves Lee's pistol and threatens to kill Flynn. When she hesitates, Luanne takes it from her and kills him. Upon returning to the diner, Luanne finds the bottle of sedatives and becomes suspicious of Laine. Laine surprises her and bludgeons her to death. Before she can escape, Gault returns. After calling for backup, he says the money was not recovered. Privately, Laine suggests that Gault is the person who murdered the corpse in Eddie's car. Gault allows Laine to leave as long as she will corroborate his version of the events.

== Cast ==
- Jocelin Donahue as Laine
- Kelly Lynch as Luanne
- Jim Beaver as Lee
- Izabella Miko as Gloria
- Jamie Harris as Flynn
- Liam Aiken as Eddie
- A. J. Bowen as Officer Gault
- Max Gail as Sean

== Release ==
The film premiered at South by Southwest on March 15, 2015. On September 9, 2016, Kino Lorber acquired distribution rights to the film.

== Reception ==
Rotten Tomatoes, a review aggregator, reports that 40% of five surveyed critics gave the film a positive review; the average rating is 6/10. Scott Foundas of Variety called it an "appreciably moody, but dramatically stilted" film whose pastiche falls too often on the side of kitsch. Foundas praised Lynch's acting and said the film should have focused on her character, which was the most interesting.
