= Born to Be Wild (1995 film) =

- Theatrical release poster
- Directed by: John Gray
- Screenplay by: John Bunzel; Paul Young
- Story by: Paul Young
- Produced by: Robert Newmyer; Jeffrey Silver
- Starring: Wil Horneff; Helen Shaver; John C. McGinley; Peter Boyle
- Cinematography: Donald M. Morgan
- Edited by: Maryann Brandon
- Music by: Mark Snow
- Production companies: Warner Bros. Fuji Entertainment; Outlaw Productions
- Distributed by: Warner Bros.
- Release date: March 31, 1995
- Running time: 100 minutes
- Country: United States
- Language: English
- Box office: $3.7 million

Born to Be Wild is a 1995 American family comedy film directed by John Gray, It was released on March 31, 1995, by Warner Bros. under their Warner Bros. Family Entertainment label.

== Plot ==
15-year-old Rick Heller is a juvenile delinquent who keeps getting into trouble. Rick's single mother, Margaret, is a behavioral scientist at University of California, Berkeley, and she is studying interspecies communication between humans and gorillas, using sign language. After Rick goes on a joyride in his mother's van, she grounds him and puts him to work cleaning the cage of a female western lowland gorilla named Katie. Rick and Katie gradually form a close friendship, and he realizes that she is much more intelligent than the average gorilla.

However, they are separated when the owner of Katie, Gus Charnley, takes her away to become a flea market freak. Rick rescues her from Charnley, and the unlikely pair go on a road trip. They aim to get out of the US and cross the Canadian border in a bid for her freedom.

Eventually, they are caught by law enforcement and Rick must stand trial for stealing Katie. She is allowed to testify with a sign language interpreter, and she insists that Rick freeing her was morally right. Although Rick is found guilty of theft, he is appointed Katie's official guardian. Rick arranges for her to live in a gorilla sanctuary with her own kind, and he promises to visit in the future.

== Cast ==
- Wil Horneff as Rick Heller
- Helen Shaver as Margaret Heller
- John C. McGinley as Max Carr
- Peter Boyle as Gus Charnley
- Jean Marie Barnwell as Lacey Carr
- Marvin J. McIntyre as Bob
- Gregory Itzin as Walter Mallinson
- Titus Welliver as Sergeant Markle
- Thomas F. Wilson as Detective Lou Greenberg (credited as Tom Wilson)
- Alan Ruck as Dan Woodley
- Jonathan Freeman as Ed Price
- Obba Babatundé as Interpreter
- David Wingert as Gary James
- John Pleshette as Donald Carr
- Janet Carroll as Judge Billings
- Talia Paul as Gorilla Team

== Production ==
The film was made in the wake of the successful family film Free Willy (1993), as noted by critics upon the release of Born to Be Wild. Free Willy's success led to the production of several films starring young protagonists and animal co-stars. Joey O'Bryan of The Austin Chronicle compared Born to be Wild to Free Willy, Andre (1994), and Monkey Trouble (1994).

== Reception ==
Review aggregation website Rotten Tomatoes gives the film an approval rating of 0% based on 9 reviews, and an average rating of 3.4/10.

Peter Stack of the San Francisco Chronicle said the animatronic gorilla looked phony, but concluded "The film has its moments of nutty fun" and "it also has a couple of touching scenes—if you can get beyond that bogus ape look." The Washington Post critic Rita Kempley called it "a heart-yanking family yarn that resembles a simian adaptation of Nell" and also compared the movie to Free Willy.

Emanuel Levy at Variety felt the film was "lacking the magic — and authenticity" of its predecessor, Free Willy, even though the gorilla character's ability to communicate allowed the film to more fully flesh out the friendship between its human and animal protagonists.

In The New York Times, Stephen Holden praised the gorilla as "one of Hollywood's more successfully designed animatronic wonders," but felt that the plot followed a "thoroughly formulaic route," was too sentimental, and "[didn't] make nearly enough out of its comic opportunities."
