= Chris Sullivan (actor) =

American television actor (born 1980)

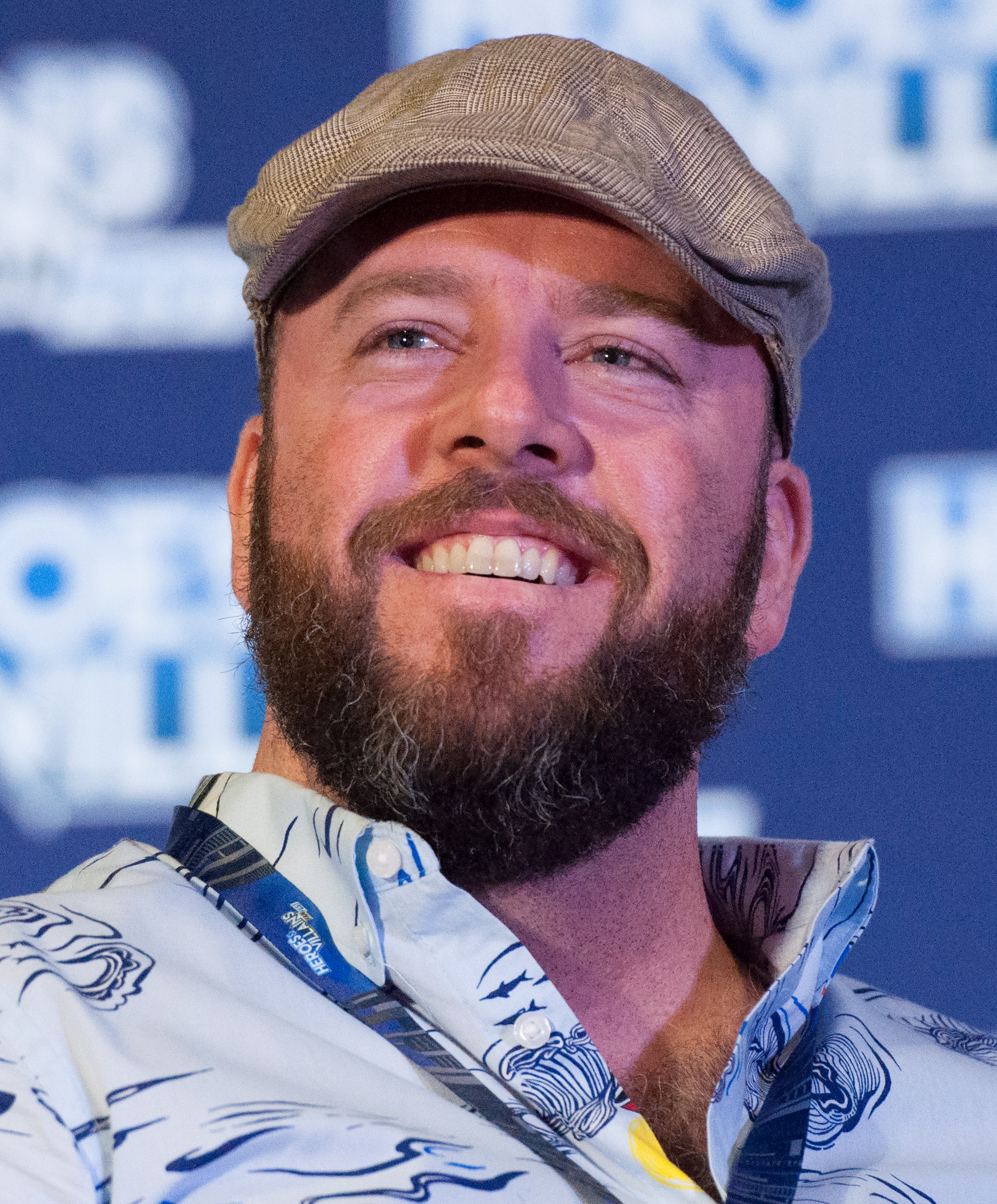
- Sullivan in 2017
- Born: Palm Springs, California, U.S.
- Education: Loyola Marymount University (BFA Theatre Arts 2002)
- Occupations: Actor; musician
- Years active: 2002–present
- Television: The Knick; This Is Us
- Spouse: Rachel Reichard (m. 2010)
- Children: 2

Chris Sullivan is an American actor and musician. He starred on Cinemax's The Knick as Tom Cleary, and on the NBC drama This Is Us as Toby Damon, for which he received two Primetime Emmy Award nominations.

== Career ==
Much of Sullivan's early stage experience came in Chicago, where he received improv training at the iO Theater. Among his Chicago stage experiences were in the cast of Defending the Caveman at the Lakeshore Theater and the cast of The Ballad of Emmett Till at the Goodman Theatre. After appearing in the original Broadway cast of Lombardi, Sullivan joined the long-running revival of Chicago in 2011.

He first gained attention for his portrayal of Tom Cleary on the Cinemax drama The Knick. He also played Taserface in Guardians of the Galaxy Vol. 2 and Benny Hammond in Stranger Things.

He has starred in single episodes of various TV series, including A Gifted Man (2012), Elementary, Law & Order: Special Victims Unit, and The Americans (2013).

He also played Sprit in the 2008 Sundance Film Festival nominated movie North Starr, and appeared in such films as The Normal Heart and The Drop (2014), the latter with The Knick co-star Jeremy Bobb.

From 2016 to 2022, Sullivan starred as Toby Damon on This Is Us. For this role, Sullivan received two nominations for the Primetime Emmy Award for Outstanding Supporting Actor in a Drama Series.

Sullivan has done voice-over work. He provided the voice of the camel in the popular "Hump Day" ad for American auto insurance company GEICO.

In March 2022, Sullivan was set to lead comedy pilot The Son In Law at ABC.

In April 2024, Sullivan joined Amazon MGM Studios' sci-fi thriller entitled Mercy.

== Personal life ==
Sullivan married producer Rachel Reichard in 2010. Their son was born in 2020 and their daughter in 2022.

== Filmography ==
=== Film ===
Year	Title	Role	Notes
2008	North Starr	Sprit	
2014	The Drop	Jimmy	
2016	Morgan	Dr. Darren Finch	
2016	Imperium	Andrew Blackwell	
2016	Live by Night	Brendan Loomis	
2017	Guardians of the Galaxy Vol. 2	Taserface	
2018	The Independents	Alvin	
2019	Adopt a Highway	Orankle	
2019	I Trapped the Devil	The Man	
2021	Broadcast Signal Intrusion	Phreaker	
2021	Agnes	Curly	
2023	Merry Little Batman	Bane (voice)	
2024	Presence	Chris	
2024	Megamind vs. the Doom Syndicate	Behemoth (voice)	
2026	Mercy	Rob Nelson	
TBA	Ally Clark		Post-production

=== Television ===
Year	Title	Role	Notes
2010	Pleading Guilty	Rash	Television film
2011	Weekends at Bellevue	Officer Mike	Television film
2012	A Gifted Man	Biker	Episode: "In Case of a Bolt from the Blue"
2013	Elementary	Todd Clarke	Episode: "The Red Team"
2013	Law & Order: Special Victims Unit	Eddy Galtin	Episode: "Monster's Legacy"
2013	The Americans	Assassin	Episode: "Mutually Assured Destruction"
2014	The Normal Heart	Mike the Tech	Television film
2014	Peter Pan Live!	Noodler	Television film
2014	Where's This Party?	Tristan Barlow	Web series; 1 episode
2014–2015	The Knick	Tom Cleary	Main role; 19 episodes
2016	Stranger Things	Benny Hammond	2 episodes
2016–2022	This Is Us	Toby Damon	Main role; director: "Heart and Soul"
2017	Curb Your Enthusiasm	Husband #1	Episode: "Fatwa!"
2018	Camping	Joe	8 episodes
2019	The Good Fight	Judge Dash Toosi	Episode: "The One About the End of the World"
2019	Amphibia	Gunther, Teddy (voice)	2 episodes
2019	Where's Waldo?	Santa Claus (voice)	Episode: "A Wanderer Christmas"
2020	Vampirina	Grogg / Steve (voice)	2 episodes
2021	What If...?	Taserface (voice)	Episode: "What If... T'Challa Became a Star-Lord?"
2022	The Calling	Paul Serra	4 episodes
2023	American Dad!	Jerry (voice)	Episode: "Viced Principal"
2024	Megamind Rules!	Behemoth (voice)	9 episodes
2025	Devil in Disguise: John Wayne Gacy	Bill Kunkle	5 episodes
2027	The Rookie: North	Nix	

=== Stage ===
Year	Title	Role	Theatre	Notes
2010–2011	Lombardi	Jim Taylor	Circle in the Square Theatre	Original
2011–2012	Chicago	Amos Hart	Ambassador Theatre	Replacement
2012–2013	Nice Work If You Can Get It	Duke Mahoney	Imperial Theatre	Original
2016	Hadestown	Hermes	New York Theatre Workshop	Original
2023	The Thanksgiving Play	Caden	Hayes Theater	Original

=== Video games ===
Year	Title	Role	Notes
2018	Madden NFL 19	Mack McGlinn	Story mode, "Longshot Homecoming"
