= North Starr =

- Directed by: Matthew Stanton
- Written by: Matthew Stanton
- Produced by: Matthew Stanton; Peter Levermann; Paula Wyndham
- Starring: Jerome Hawkins; Matthew Stanton; Chris Sullivan; Isaac Lamb; Zach Johnson; Wayne Campbell
- Cinematography: Peter Levermann
- Edited by: Peter Levermann
- Music by: J.B. Reynolds
- Release date: January 20, 2008 (Sundance)
- Running time: 115 minutes
- Country: United States
- Language: English

North Starr is a 2008 film directed by Matthew Stanton.

It was scheduled to compete in the Dramatic Competition at the 2008 Sundance Film Festival.

== Plot ==
A young African American man living in Houston witnesses his best friend's brutal murder, then flees to the small, racially intolerant, backwater town of Trublin.

== Cast ==
- Jerome Hawkins as Demetrious
- Matthew Stanton as Darring Clements
- Chris Sullivan as Sprit
- Isaac Lamb as T.J.
- Zack Johnson as Justin
- Wayne Campbell as Wayne

== Reception ==
Justin Chang of Variety described the movie as "a messy Texas stew of racial tension, personal liberation and murder-in-retrospect detective story." He praised the likable characters but criticized the "self-indulgent" first-time director's work. James Greenberg of The Hollywood Reporter called it "long on passion and somewhat lacking in execution," stressing the lack of experience on the part of the producer-director-writer-actor Matthew Stanton.
