= The Yearling (1994 film) =

- Genre: Adventure; Drama; Family
- Based on: The Yearling by Marjorie Kinnan Rawlings
- Written by: Joe Wiesenfeld
- Directed by: Rod Hardy
- Starring: Peter Strauss; Jean Smart
- Music by: Lee Holdridge
- Country of origin: United States
- Original language: English

Production
- Executive producers: David R. Ames; Sandra Birnhak Ames; Robert Halmi; Robert Halmi Jr.
- Producer: Edwin Self
- Cinematography: David Connell
- Editor: Richard Bracken
- Running time: 90 minutes
- Production companies: RHI Entertainment; Showcase Productions International

Original release
- Network: CBS
- Release: April 24, 1994

The Yearling is a 1994 American made-for-television coming-of-age drama film based on the 1938 novel The Yearling by Marjorie Kinnan Rawlings. It was produced by RHI Entertainment, sponsored by Kraft General Foods and broadcast on CBS on April 24, 1994. It is also a remake of the 1946 theatrical film The Yearling starring Gregory Peck and Jane Wyman.

== Premise ==
A young, impoverished 12-year-old boy named Jody Baxter (Wil Horneff), the lone surviving child of four, lives on a farm in 1870s in an area that is now part of the Ocala National Forest, near Silver Glen Springs, shortly after the American Civil War. Jody develops a lasting bond with an orphaned deer named Flag.

== Cast ==
- Peter Strauss as Ezra "Penny" Baxter
- Jean Smart as Ora Baxter
- Philip Seymour Hoffman as Buck Forrester
- Wil Horneff as Jody Baxter
- Jarred Blancard as Fodder-Wing Forrester
- Brad Greenquist as Lem Forrester
- Mary Nell Santcroc as Ma Forrester
- Richard Hamilton as Pa Forrester
- Scott Sowers as Boyle
- Ed Grady as Doc Wilson
- Susan F. Allen as Lyla
- Kerry Wallum as James
- Bart Hansard as Milwheel Forrester

== Reception ==
Reviewer Drew Voros of Variety wrote that "the absence of true grit and dirt-under-fingernails feeling weaken the believability of the drama," though "like the novel and the ’46 film version, death is taken very seriously, and life is not taken for granted. For this alone, despite the glitches, young viewers should be encouraged to watch."
