= Cold November =

- Directed by: Karl Jacob
- Written by: Karl Jacob
- Produced by: Karl Jacob; Jessica Bergen
- Starring: Bijou Abas; Karl Jacob; Heidi Fellner; Anna Klemp; Mary Kay Fortier-Spaulding
- Cinematography: Benjamin Kasulke
- Edited by: Pete Ohs
- Music by: Kubilay Uner
- Production companies: Pollywogs Films & KJAX
- Distributed by: Monument Releasing
- Release date: March 23, 2018
- Running time: 92 minutes
- Country: United States
- Language: English

Cold November is a 2018 independent film written & directed by Karl Jacob. It premiered in competition at the 2017 Woodstock Film Festival and internationally at CPH:PIX.

A 12-year-old girl being raised within a matriarchal household is taken through the right of passage of killing a deer for the first time. Expectations dissolve into chaos, and Florence finds herself alone, relying on instinct and training to follow through with her decisions, pull herself together, and face becoming an adult in the North American wilderness.

== Cast ==
- Bijou Abas as Florence
- Karl Jacob as Uncle Craig
- Heidi Fellner as Mia
- Anna Klemp as Amanda
- Mary Kay Fortier-Spaulding as Grandma Georgia
