= Taserface =

Fictional character appearing in American comic books published by Marvel Comics

Publication information
- Publisher: Marvel Comics
- First appearance: Guardians of the Galaxy #1 (June 1990)
- Created by: Aaron Valentino; Jim Valentino

In-story information
- Species: Stark
- Notable aliases: Overkill, Nameless One
- Abilities: Energy absorption, vast array of weapons

Taserface is a fictional character appearing in American comic books published by Marvel Comics. He is a supervillain and a recurring adversary of the original Guardians of the Galaxy.

Taserface appears in several forms of media, such as the Marvel Cinematic Universe film Guardians of the Galaxy Vol. 2 (2017) and Disney+ animated series What If...? (2021) as a different version, portrayed by Chris Sullivan.

== Publication history ==
Taserface first appeared in Guardians of the Galaxy #1 (June 1990), and was created by Jim Valentino. Valentino stated that his young son Aaron came up with the character's name. He believed that the name was "kind of lame...but no worse than Pruneface, Clayface, Two-Face, or any other character with the word face as part of their name."

== Fictional character biography ==
Taserface originates from a planet with a primitive culture. One day, a cache of armor and technology created by Tony Stark wound up on the planet. The inhabitants quickly adapted themselves to the new technology, calling themselves the Stark after their idol, and proceeded to use the technology to conquer other planets.

Taserface is deployed to the planet Courg to keep an eye on it and ends up fighting the Guardians of the Galaxy. After his defeat, he is tortured by his species and has his name taken from him. Now known as the Nameless One, his hatred for the Guardians grows.

The Nameless One pleads mercy to the High Sister for redemption. He is converted into a cyborg and given the name Overkill. He fights Hollywood, an alternate version of Wonder Man, and is easily defeated. He attempts to detonate himself in a last minute revenge scheme, but Hollywood absorbs the blast, killing only Overkill.

== Powers and abilities ==
Taserface's cyborg body gives him enhanced durability, an array of weapons, and the ability to absorb and redirect energy.

== In other media ==
=== Television ===
Taserface appears in Lego Marvel Super Heroes - Guardians of the Galaxy: The Thanos Threat, voiced by Travis Willingham. This version is an ally of Yondu's Ravagers.

=== Marvel Cinematic Universe ===
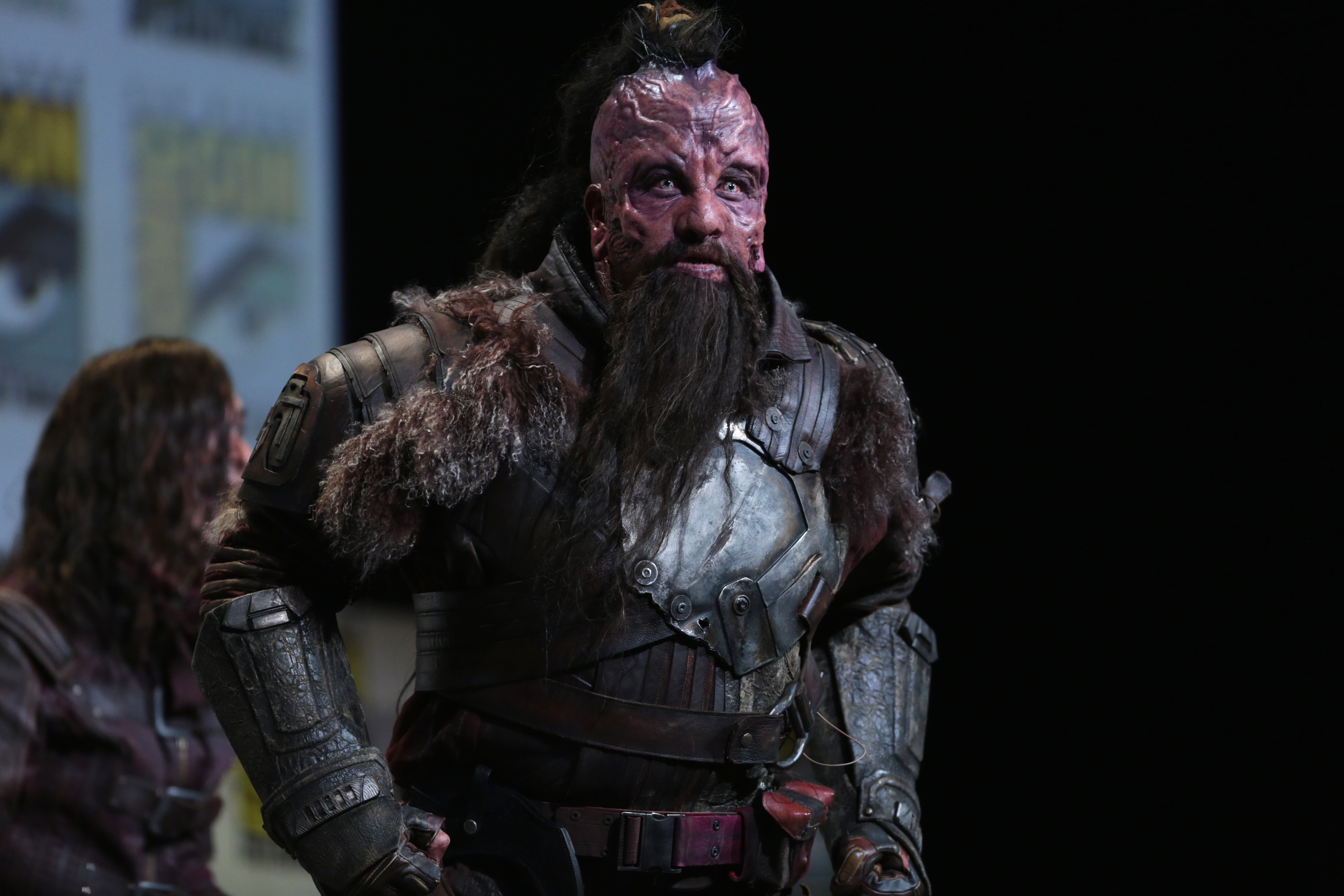
Chris Sullivan as Taserface at the 2016 San Diego Comic-Con promoting the 2017 film Guardians of the Galaxy Vol. 2.

Taserface appears in media set in the Marvel Cinematic Universe, portrayed by Chris Sullivan. This version is a member of Yondu Udonta's Ravagers. Additionally, he is depicted as being proud of his name, believing it strikes fear into his enemies despite others mocking it.

- Taserface first appears in the live-action film Guardians of the Galaxy Vol. 2. After being officially named director of Guardians of the Galaxy, James Gunn, who once called Taserface "the dumbest character of all time," jokingly shared a photo of him on social media. He later clarified that he would never feature the character in a film. Gunn later changed his mind, and while crafting this character, felt that Taserface had named himself. Hence, he described him as "a real dumbass", yet also "a very powerful guy." Discussing the character's look in The Art of the Film, visual development illustrator Anthony Francisco says, "Taserface was described to me as needing to be very scary-looking, but he wants you to think he is the absolute coolest. I translated this into conceptualizing various things he might wear or add onto his Ravager jumpsuit — things that he thinks are badass or interesting. But ultimately, he is just trying too hard." Feeling that Yondu is "going soft", Taserface leads a mutiny against him and kills anyone still loyal to the former. After Kraglin aids Yondu, Rocket, and Groot in escaping from their prison cells, Yondu kills the remaining Ravagers and destroys the main engine, causing the Ravager ship to explode. While the four escape in a smaller escape ship, Taserface contacts the Sovereign to give them Yondu's coordinates before dying in the explosion.
- An alternate universe variant of Taserface appears in the Disney+ animated series What If...? episode "What If... T'Challa Became a Star-Lord?", voiced by Sullivan.

=== Video games ===
Taserface appears as a playable character in Lego Marvel Super Heroes 2, voiced by Simon Kerr.
