= The Independents (film) =

- Official release poster
- Directed by: Greg Naughton
- Written by: Greg Naughton
- Produced by: Jonathan Burkhart; Dorottya Mathe; Greg Naughton
- Starring: Rich Price; Greg Naughton; Brian Chartrand; Boyd Gaines; James Naughton; Keira Naughton; Kelli O'Hara; Chris Sullivan; George Wendt; Richard Kind
- Cinematography: Piero Basso
- Edited by: Jon Vesey
- Music by: The Sweet Remains
- Production company: RGB Film
- Distributed by: Giant Pictures
- Release dates: February 3, 2018 (SBIFF); February 26, 2021 (United States)
- Running time: 96 minutes
- Country: United States
- Language: English

The Independents is a 2018 American musical comedy-drama film written and directed by Greg Naughton, who stars alongside Rich Price and Brian Chartrand. The film is loosely based on the formation of the trio's real-life band, The Sweet Remains. It premiered at the Santa Barbara International Film Festival in February 2018, and was released three years later on February 26, 2021.

== Premise ==
Three down-on-their luck musicians form a group and begin touring for a one last shot at fame.

== Cast ==
- Rich Price as Rich
- Greg Naughton as Greg
- Brian Chartrand as Brian
- Boyd Gaines as Professor Green
- Kelli O'Hara as Kelly
- James Naughton as Officer Sanders
- Richard Kind as Granny

== Release ==
The film premiered at the Santa Barbara International Film Festival on February 6, 2018. It also screened at the DeadCENTER Film Festival on June 7, 2018, and the Mill Valley Film Festival on October 5, 2018. It was released digitally on February 26, 2021, by Giant Pictures.

== Reception ==
Review aggregator website Rotten Tomatoes reports that 100% of eight critics gave the film a positive review, with an average rating of 7/10.

Stephen Farber of The Hollywood Reporter gave the film a positive review and wrote, "The songs are smoothly integrated into the story, but the film's main virtue is the warmth it shows toward the three main characters and their sometimes desperate dreams."
