= I Trapped the Devil =

2019 American supernatural horror film

- Theatrical release poster
- Directed by: Josh Lobo
- Written by: Josh Lobo
- Produced by: Josh Lobo; Spence Nicholson; Rowan Russell; Scott Weinberg
- Starring: A. J. Bowen; Scott Poythress; Susan Burke; Jocelin Donahue; Chris Sullivan
- Cinematography: Bryce Holden
- Edited by: Josh Lobo
- Music by: Ben Lovett
- Production company: Yellow Veil Pictures
- Distributed by: IFC Midnight
- Release dates: April 12, 2019 (Imagine); April 26, 2019 (United States)
- Running time: 82 minutes
- Country: United States
- Language: English

I Trapped the Devil is a 2019 American supernatural horror film written, produced, edited, and directed by Josh Lobo in his feature film directorial debut. It stars A. J. Bowen, Scott Poythress, Susan Theresa Burke, Jocelin Donahue, and Chris Sullivan. It premiered at the Imagine Film Festival on April 12, 2019, and IFC Midnight released the film theatrically in the United States and simultaneously via video-on-demand platforms on April 26, 2019.

== Plot ==
Married couple Matt and Karen visit Matt's troubled brother Steve during Christmas unannounced. Steve, who occasionally sees visions through television static and receives disturbing phone calls, at first insists they leave. When they refuse, Steve shows Matt and Karen a padlocked door bearing a cross in the basement. Matt and Karen hear a man's voice call for help, and Steve claims his prisoner is the devil. Steve dodges questions about details by saying that something evil conjured itself into the shape of a man, and he trapped it behind the door. Steve begs them to believe him despite how crazy it sounds.

Wanting to understand his brother's reasoning, Matt entertains the idea that Steve captured the devil, but Karen refuses to be complicit in a crime. Matt suggests they let the man go and get mental help for Steve. After discussing their broken relationship, Steve shows Matt a book that posits the devil manipulates people into committing evil acts. Steve claims that by trapping the devil, people can not be supernaturally tempted. Steve takes Matt to a room of interconnected newspaper clippings that he says shows the devil's pattern. Steve suggests that a missing girl who recently returned home is the start of a trend because the devil is trapped.

When Matt asks about the phone calls, Steve says he thinks someone is coming for the devil and likely influenced Matt to arrive. As the brothers talk, Karen returns to the basement, intending to release the prisoner. When an odd feeling causes Karen to hesitate, the man taunts her. Steve pulls Karen out of the basement at gunpoint and questions her about what the man said. Matt convinces Steve to put down the gun. Unsure of what to do next, they all sleep.

Matt reexamines Steve's pattern walls and pauses on a newspaper clipping about a car crash on Christmas. Karen confronts Steve in the basement, and he speaks cryptically about a tragic accident that took the lives of his wife Sarah and their young daughter. Steve ultimately blames the devil for what happened. Steve challenges Karen to open the door, but before she can, he knocks her unconscious and locks her in the basement. Steve locks Matt in the pattern room. While Matt escapes and reconnects with Karen, Steve has a vision of a longhaired man holding a stuffed bunny toy. As the man pleads for help to stop someone's bleeding, Steve sees Sarah wearing a blindfold. Realizing she is not real as the vision becomes more terrifying, Steve prepares to shoot Sarah.

Matt and Karen shake Steve back to reality, and Matt talks Steve into giving up the gun. As Matt tries to free the prisoner, Karen and Steve attempt to dissuade him. When this fails, Steve stabs Matt. Steve goes upstairs, distraught. Karen follows after Steve and shoots him. When Karen returns downstairs, the imprisoned man tries to convince her they can still save Matt, but she doesn't open the door, and the man applauds her. Two cops, Alan and Ben, enter the house, where Alan finds Steve's body. In the basement, Karen and Alan shoot each other. Alan bleeds to death and, as Karen lays dying, shakes her head in an attempt to keep Ben from opening the door. Ben opens it, and the man inside takes a deep breath. But, instead of a man, a little girl dressed all in black walks past everyone and exits outside through the front door, skipping joyfully, free once again.

== Cast ==
- A. J. Bowen as Matt
- Scott Poythress as Steve
- Susan Theresa Burke as Karen
- Jocelin Donahue as Sarah
- Chris Sullivan as The Man
- Rowan Russell as Ben
- John Marrott as Alan
- Jack Vernon as Santa
- Victoria Smith as Her

== Production ==
According to director Josh Lobo, A.J, Bowen came onboard as Matt because "he was basically like, 'I've been looking for a long time for a Christmas film to do.'" I Trapped the Devil connected with that because "it's not a traditional Christmas movie. [...] It's a psychological horror film that takes place during Christmas."

The film was produced on a budget of around $1,000,000.

== Critical response ==
On review aggregator website Rotten Tomatoes, the film has an approval rating of 71% based on 35 reviews, with an average rating of 6.4/10. The site's consensus reads, "A slow burning horror story that takes spine-tingling advantage of its setting and cast, I Trapped the Devil marks an auspicious debut for writer-director Josh Lobo." On Metacritic, it has a weighted average score of 47 out of 100 based on seven reviews.

Writing in the Los Angeles Times in 2019, Noel Murray gave the film a positive review. He praised its "genuinely disturbing phantasmagoria" and concluded Lobo "knows how to make audiences uncomfortable — first with tedium, then with terror."

=== Accolades ===
Received two nominations at Method Fest Independent Film Festival 2019:

- The Essentia Best Ensemble Cast Feature Film
- Festival Director Award for an Outstanding Performance Feature Film (Jocelin Donahue, I Trapped the Devil)
