= Live at the Foxes Den =

Live at the Foxes Den is a 2013 drama film. It marks the directorial debut for Michael Kristoff, and stars Jackson Rathbone, Jocelin Donahue, Jack Holmes, Pooch Hall, Brian Doyle-Murray, Bob Gunton and Elliott Gould. It was shot in the greater Los Angeles area and was released on December 6, 2013. Den tells the story of a young and disenchanted lawyer, Bobby (Rathbone), who after a night of debauchery decides to leave his job at a prestigious law firm to sing in a lounge called "The Foxes Den." Songs from Frank Sinatra, Jack Jones and others are featured in "The Foxes Den" as is original music penned by star and co-writer, Jack Holmes. Kevin Mann, Peer Pedersen and Matthew Perniciaro serve as executive producers. Adam Gibbs and Roger Pugliese produced the film.
