= The Sweet Remains =

American folk-rock band

Brian Chartrand trio at a performance in Germany 2018

The Sweet Remains is an American folk-rock band founded by singer-songwriters Rich Price, Greg Naughton, and Brian Chartrand. Their independently released 2008 debut Laurel & Sunset (produced in collaboration with Andy Zulla) nonetheless reached a global audience when Putumayo World Music featured their single "Dance With Me" on Putumayo's popular Acoustic Cafe compilation. The band's follow up release, North & Prospect, garnered a USA Today "pick of the week" feature for the song "Better Ways to Spend The Day", further broadening the reach of their music and reputation for creating "lush 3-part harmonies" over strong lyrical and melodic writing. Also in 2019, the band began releasing singles via social media, including "Music Fills the Spaces" (released Feb 1, 2019) and "Howling Wolf" (March 1, 2019) with an announced plan to release one per month through 2019 before compiling them on a full-length release.

In February 2018, the band starred in the film The Independents, which features the formation story and music of the band. Written and directed by Naughton, it premiered at the Santa Barbara International Film Festival and won the jury prize for "best feature film 2018" at the Omaha Film Festival in March 2018. The band announced a distribution deal for the film with Blackbox Global in January 2019, with a general release in February 2021.

== History ==
Prior to the formation of The Sweet Remains, all three members were deeply involved in solo careers. Price recorded his first solo album Night Opens in 2002, before he and Naughton began musically collaborating on Price's album Miles From Anywhere (recorded in 2004 while he was signed to Geffen) which included the single "I'm on my way," featured on the Shrek 2 soundtrack. Since then, Price has recorded two additional solo albums: All These Roads (2006), and his latest release, moonlight breaks (2011). Naughton, who comes from a family of actors (his father is James Naughton, wife is Kelli O’Hara and uncle David Naughton) also started as an actor and director and founded the Blue Light Theater Company in New York City, though he performs primarily as a singer-songwriter. His independently released CD Demo-gogue and the Sun Songs was co-produced by recording artist Phoebe Snow. Since 2003, Chartrand has released over 11 albums with various projects, including The Voce Project and Ten Dollar Outfit, along with his solo releases.

Price, Naughton, and Chartrand formed The Sweet Remains in 2008, during a chance jam-session in a hotel room in Rhode Island. The three musicians began composing and recording with each other during breaks in their solo careers in a studio in Los Angeles. After releasing its debut album Laurel & Sunset in 2009, Live at the Canal Room was released next in 2012, followed by their sophomore studio album North & Prospect in 2013. In 2012, the band reported recording tracks with producer Iestyn Polson, though there is no related release to date. In September 2015, the band released their third studio album Night Songs, once again in collaboration with producer Andy Zulla.

== Recognition ==
- The band is best known for their songs "Moving in Slow Motion", "Dance With Me" and "When We Were Young". They have accumulated over 35 million plays on Spotify as of January 2019.
- The album North & Prospect was highlighted in USA Today as their pick of the week in March 2013.
- In 2011, the song "What I’m Looking For" was featured in a Subaru T.V. commercial, and later for an Eddie Bauer ad campaign.
- In September 2011, "Dance With Me" was also featured in the Putumayo Music compilation Acoustic Café.
- The Boston Herald wrote in a review of The Sweet Remains in 2009: "It's been a long time since three-part harmonies this lush were yoked to songs as melodically gorgeous as these."
- Time Out NY called The Sweet Remains "a smooth take on Crosby, Stills & Nash and James Taylor" in 2012.
- The Sweet Remains has toured throughout the United States and Europe, most recently completing their 6th European tour in the fall of 2015.
- In addition to airplay on many triple A and college stations, The Sweet Remains has had rotations at several national commercial stations including: G105 (Raleigh, North Carolina) for "Dance With Me", KFOG (San Francisco, California) has "rotated" numerous songs, and WFUV (New York City).

== Band members ==
- Rich Price (Burlington, VT)
- Brian Chartrand (Phoenix, AZ)
- Greg Naughton (New York, NY)

== Discography ==
- Laurel & Sunset (2009)
- Live at the Canal Room (2012)
- North & Prospect (2013)
- Night Songs (2015)
