= Young American Bodies =

American web series

- Written by: Joe Swanberg; Kris Williams; Karl Jacob
- Directed by: Joe Swanberg; Kris Williams
- Starring: Joe Swanberg; Mollie Leibovitz; Karl Jacob; Nathan Adloff; Kris Williams; Eve Rounds; Nikita Word
- Composer: Nick Wright
- Country of origin: United States
- No. of seasons: 4
- No. of episodes: 38

Production
- Producers: Joe Swanberg; Kris Williams
- Cinematography: Joe Swanberg; Kris Williams; Karl Jacob
- Editor: Joe Swanberg
- Running time: 5–8 minutes

Original release
- Network: Nerve.com; IFC
- Release: January 2006

Young American Bodies is an American web series, which originally premiered on Nerve.com and aired on IFC and at IFC.com in the United States until 2009.

Considered to be the first Mumblecore television series, each short episode looks into the intersecting love lives of six twenty-somethings in Chicago and was known for its honest portrayal of sexuality.

The series was produced and directed by Joe Swanberg and Kris Swanberg, and featured actors Greta Gerwig, Lynn Shelton and Karl Jacob.

== Cast and crew ==
=== Major characters ===
- Mollie Leibovitz as Maggie
- Joe Swanberg as Ben
- Kris Williams as Dia
- Frank V. Ross as Kelly
- Ryan Smith as Noah
- Karl Jacob as Ted
- Nikita Word as Natalie

=== Crew ===
Name	Position
Joe Swanberg	Producer, writer, director, director of Photography and editor
Kris Williams	Producer, writer, director, cinematographer
Karl Jacob	Writer, cinematographer
Kevin Bewersdorf	Opening Titles and Theme Song
Nick Wright	Music

== Episodes ==
=== Season 1 (2006) ===
No.	Title	Original release date	Prod. code
1	"January 1st, 2006"	N/A	101
Maggie's New Year's resolution is to stop being that girl who only sleep with guys who have no interest in dating her. Cassie, her roommate and friend, vows to help her. Roommates Ben and Dia talk about staying in on New Year's Eve and instead talk about dreams.
2	"Maggie's Big Move"	N/A	102
Ben has to decide if he will answer Maggie's call or hook up with Dia's friend.
3	"The Silent Treatment"	N/A	103
Dia confronts Ben about her friend, while Maggie gets ready for the big night as Casey tries to talk to her about relationships.
4	"Faking The Band"	N/A	104
Ben walks in on Dia in bed, and talks to Maggie about her private affairs.
5	"All Grown Up"	N/A	105
Casey and Noah try and makes things work.
6	"The Blue Dress"	N/A	106
Ben and Maggie brainstorm t-shirt ideas for the band, when Ben gets a call from his ex-girlfriend who wants him to hang out with her.
7	"Drama Free Night"	N/A	107
Dia talks to Ben after he regrets spending the night with his ex. Ben takes Casey out to dinner to try to help her with her problems with Noah, but Maggie suspects other reasons.
8	"Funny Is Good"	N/A	108
Maggie and Ben are at a coffee shop, but Ben can't work on the band's website because he is distracted by Maggie's flirtations.
9	"She Said No"	N/A	109
Noah comes back to get his stuff after the proposal to Casey. Ben starts to wonder if he should be in the band when Maggie misses another meeting with the web designer.
10	"A Touch Test"	N/A	110
After Ben may have taken romance a little too far, Dia tries to help by playing "cupid." Maggie is tired of going out and wants to hang out.
11	"Girls Night In"	N/A	111
Ben wants to make-up with Casey, but her Girl's Night In with Dia and Maggie spoils his plans. The girls get into a game of Truth or Dare, testing Maggie's limit.
12	"Calm and Tame"	N/A	112
Ben watches as Kelly helps Dia move out. He tries to connect with Casey, and wonders whether or not Maggie is making him happy or putting him in a difficult situation.

=== Season 2 (2008) ===
No.	Title	Original release date	Prod. code
13	"Do Not Disturb"	N/A	201
14	"You Look Good"	N/A	202
15	"In The Wave"	N/A	203
16	"A Terrible Idea"	N/A	204
17	"One Month Later"	N/A	205
18	"Maggie's Big Move"	N/A	206
19	"In The Flesh"	N/A	207
20	"A Familiar Face"	N/A	208

=== Season 3 (2009) ===
No.	Title	Original release date	Prod. code
21	"A Better Proposal"	N/A	301
Studying with Sarah isn't as fun as when Ben was dating her. Dia and Kelly think about getting married, and Maggie thinks about coming back to Chicago.
22	"Dating for Nerds"	N/A	302
Ben likes a girl at the local coffee shop, but it's not clear whether or not she thinks he's being cute or obnoxious. Noah's relationship status turns 180 degrees.
23	"A Real Smile"	N/A	303
Dia makes some rules about her engagement ring while Ben receives a very engaging photography lesson from Natalie.
24	"Your New Neighbor"	N/A	304
Maggie's moving back, but Ben is not happy with who her new neighbor is going to be. Meanwhile, Kelly's back massage turns into a boob massage with Dia at the helm.
25	"Maggie Comes Home"	N/A	305
After Maggie comes home, Ted disappears into Ben's room. Noah and Owen try a new position.
26	"In Ted World"	N/A	306
Ben distracts Natalie at work and Maggie tries to resist Ted.
27	"A Real Workout"	N/A	307
Ben decides he needs to get into shape and Dia is there to help out. Maggie meets a guy at school.
28	"The Fantasy Hurdle"	N/A	308
Ben and Sarah talk and he explains how he didn't want to answer the phone in front of her because of "boyfriend voice." The conversation continues to heat up as Natalie talks about auditioning for "The Secret World of Alex Mack."
29	"A Little Disappointing"	N/A	309
After Noah and Owen hang out in the morning, Noah shows Kelly "2 Girls 1 Cup." Dia's engagement ring hunt is not turning out as she expected.
30	"The Resting Pose"	N/A	310
Natalie's new tattoo gets Ben excited about scrawling all over her. Maggies gets a Yoga lesson from Ted.
31	"A Friendship Buffer"	N/A	311
While Noah updates Ben's tattoo, Ben frets over Sarah and whether or note they can still be friends.
32	"Kind of Fast"	N/A	312
Kelly pops the question to Dia, while Natalie asks her own question of Ben. So Ted asks a question of Maggie, but the answer may not be the truth.

=== Season 4 (2009) ===
No.	Title	Original release date	Prod. code
33	"The Honeymoon Suite"	N/A	401
34	"Enough About Me"	N/A	402
35	"Some Good Positions"	N/A	403
36	"Breakfast In Bed"	N/A	404
37	"Boys Are Lame"	N/A	405
38	"More Than Friends"	N/A	406
