= Ghost in the Machine (1993 film) =

1993 film by Rachel Talalay

- Theatrical release poster
- Directed by: Rachel Talalay
- Written by: William Davies; William Osborne
- Produced by: Paul Schiff
- Starring: Karen Allen; Chris Mulkey; Ted Marcoux; Wil Horneff; Jessica Walter; Brandon Adams; Rick Ducommun; Nancy Fish; Jack Laufer
- Cinematography: Phil Méheux
- Edited by: Janice Hampton; Erica Huggins
- Music by: Graeme Revell
- Distributed by: 20th Century Fox
- Release date: December 29, 1993
- Running time: 95 minutes
- Country: United States
- Language: English
- Budget: $12 million
- Box office: $5.1 million

Ghost in the Machine is a 1993 American science fiction horror film directed by Rachel Talalay and released by 20th Century Fox about a deceased serial killer with artificial computer intelligence.

== Plot ==
While working at a computer store in Cleveland, Ohio, serial killer Karl Hochman, known as "The Address Book Killer" due to habitually stealing address books and choosing his victims from them, obtains the address book of Terry Munroe, a customer, as the store manager uses the book to demonstrate a handheld scanner. He copies a page of her address book into a computer. On a rainy night while heading home, Karl hurriedly drives into an oncoming lane and swerves to miss a truck. This causes his car to go off the road into a cemetery, all while he laughs maniacally.

In the emergency room, he is put into an MRI machine. A surge from an electrical storm causes his soul to be transferred into a computer. Now, as a network-based entity, Karl continues to plot his killing spree using various objects connected to the electrical grid and computer networks.

Karl accesses the scanned page from Terry's address book and begins to kill everyone listed on the page. Her boss, Frank Mallory, becomes the first victim when his microwave oven begins irradiating the entire kitchen. Another friend, Elliot Miller, gets burned to death when a hand dryer turns into a flamethrower. Later on, babysitter Carol Maibaum is hired to look after Terry's son Josh and his best friend Frazer. However, Carol becomes the third victim; she is electrocuted from an exposed electrical cord on the kitchen floor when the dishwasher explodes and floods the kitchen.

The police do not believe the theory that Karl is on a killing spree after his death, but Josh realizes the order of the killings parallels a list of contacts from Terry's address book. Terry, along with noted computer hacker Bram Walker, unplugs everything in her house.

The police then receive anonymous reports of an armed robbery, a hostage situation, domestic violence, and a murder in progress, all at Terry's house. The police open fire on the home after mistaking an exploding pole transformer for gunfire. After realizing their mistake, they cease fire. Terry's mother goes into shock during the siege and is transported to the hospital for recovery. Aided by Bram and Josh, Bram manages to defeat Karl by introducing a computer virus that traps him in a physics laboratory. They activate an atom smasher located in the laboratory, which draws Karl in and destroys him with its extremely powerful magnetic field.

As the film ends, Bram tells Terry to turn off a heart rate monitor in an ambulance, causing the screen to fade to black.

== Cast ==
- Karen Allen as Terry Munroe
- Chris Mulkey as Bram Walker
- Ted Marcoux as Karl Hochman
- Wil Horneff as Josh Munroe
- Jessica Walter as Elaine Spencer
- Brandon Adams as Frazer
- Rick Ducommun as Phil Stewart
- Jack Laufer as Elliott Miller
- Shevonne Durkin as Carol Maibaum
- Richard McKenzie as Frank Mallory
- Nancy Fish as Karl's Landlord
- Richard Schiff as Scanner Technician

== Production ==
In 1987, writers William Davies and William Osborne first got the idea for Ghost in the Machine when reading about a piece of computer software called Skeleton Key, which allowed users to invade other computer networks and retrieve all data within them without owners knowing anything about it, and crafted a premise wherein a serial killer was absorbed into a computer and now possessed those same abilities. Due to the release of Wes Craven's Shocker, 20th Century Fox briefly put the film in turnaround due to perceived similarities between the two films, however the film resumed development at Fox following uncredited re-writes by Todd Graff.

The film's special effects were provided by Video Image under the direction of special effects supervisor Richard Hollander. In order to create evolutionary images of the electronic serial killer's computerized environment, at the suggestion of director Rachel Talalay, Hollander and his group decided to digitally manipulate real-life data taken from MRI body scans. Ted Marcoux, who plays Killer Karl, was scanned at UCLA.

The film was shot over the course of 51 days in Los Angeles, which doubled for the film's Cleveland, Ohio setting.

== Release and reception ==
Ghost in the Machine had initially been slated for release in August 1993, but to avoid competition with Jurassic Park and other major fall releases, its release was delayed until December.

During its opening weekend, Ghost in the Machine grossed $1,854,431 and ranked at no. 10. By the end of its run, it had grossed a domestic total of $5,086,909, failing to recoup its $12 million budget.

On the review aggregator website Rotten Tomatoes, the film has a rating of 10% based on 10 reviews, with an average rating of 3.4/10.

=== Home video ===
Ghost in the Machine was released on VHS and LaserDisc on May 25, 1994, and on DVD on January 17, 2006.

== See also ==
- List of ghost films
