= The Roost =

- Release poster
- Directed by: Ti West
- Written by: Ti West
- Produced by: Larry Fessenden
- Starring: Tom Noonan; Karl Jacob; Wil Horneff; Vanessa Horneff; Suyash Pachauri OTT
- Cinematography: Eric Robbins
- Edited by: Ti West
- Music by: Jeff Grace
- Production companies: Glass Eye Pix; ECR Productions
- Distributed by: Vitagraph Films
- Release dates: March 12, 2005 (SXSW); October 3, 2006 (United States)
- Running time: 80 minutes
- Country: United States
- Language: English
- Box office: $5,642

The Roost is a 2005 American horror film written, directed, and edited by Ti West, in his directorial debut. It stars Tom Noonan, Karl Jacob, Wil Horneff and Vanessa Horneff.

The Roost had its world premiere at South by Southwest on March 12, 2005, and was released on DVD in the United States on October 3, 2006, by Showtime and Paramount Home Entertainment. It received positive reviews from critics.

== Plot ==
On television show Frightmare Theatre, the Horror Host welcomes viewers and introduces them to the film they are about to see, The Roost.

Four friends – Trevor, Allison, Brian, and Elliot – are traveling to go to a wedding. They are frightened by a bat flying into the windshield and crash the car in a ditch, and are unable to get it started again. With no other ideas, the four go to look for a nearby house to call for help, not realizing the older couple within the nearest house have been killed by an unseen force. While looking for help, the friends are attacked by a swarm of bats. A police officer who comes to investigate the house is attacked by bats as well, causing him to fall off a ledge to his death. However, the bats' attack causes the dead police officer to reanimate and attack the friends, who are forced to imprison him and then kill him.

One by one, each of the friends is attacked by the reanimated corpses of those killed by bats, leaving only Allison and Elliot alive. They realize their situation is hopeless and accept their fate. However, back on the TV program, the Horror Host expresses displeasure at this ending, and rewinds the film to see the film's "alternate", more exciting ending, in which Allison is killed by the bats and Elliot flees the house in the police officer's car. He stops at a bridge, asking a tow truck driver for help. The driver is attacked and killed by another swarm of bats, and Elliot is attacked by a reanimated Allison.

The Horror Host warns viewers that the show is over and his master is home, telling them to leave. The "viewer" holding the camera is attacked by a demonic dog, ending the film.

== Cast ==
- Tom Noonan as Horror Host
- Karl Jacob as Trevor
- Vanessa Horneff as Allison
- Sean Reid as Brian
- Wil Horneff as Elliot
- Barbara Wilhide as May
- Richard Little as Elvin
- John Speredakos as Officer Mitchell
- Larry Fessenden as Tow Truck Driver

== Release ==
The Roost had its world premiere at South by Southwest on March 12, 2005. It was released on DVD on October 3, 2006 by Showtime and Paramount Home Entertainment.

== Reception ==
=== Box office ===
The Roost garnered $5,642 ($9,953 in 2025) at the box office after its theatrical run.

=== Critical response ===
On Rotten Tomatoes, the film holds an approval rating of 47% based on 17 reviews, with a weighted average rating of 5.4/10. On Metacritic, which assigns a normalized rating to reviews, the film has a weighted average score of 62 out of 100, based on 10 critics, indicating "generally favorable" reviews.

Kim Newman from Empire gave it 3/4 stars, calling it "a creepy vampire variant". Jeannette Catsoulis from New York Times gave the film a mixed review, writing, "Creatively shot and framed by the cinematographer Eric Robbins, who constructs gorgeously lighted centerpieces surrounded by strips of menacing black, the movie almost overcomes its low budget and threadbare plot. Almost." Robert Koehler from Variety wrote, "The Roost celebrates and restores the 1970s B-horror pic with zero gloss and terrific, rough-hewn craft."
