= The House of the Devil (2009 film) =

2009 film by Ti West

- Theatrical release poster by Neil Kellerhouse
- Directed by: Ti West
- Written by: Ti West
- Produced by: Josh Braun; Roger Kass; Larry Fessenden; Peter Phok
- Starring: Jocelin Donahue; Tom Noonan; Mary Woronov; Greta Gerwig; A. J. Bowen; Dee Wallace
- Cinematography: Eliot Rockett
- Edited by: Ti West
- Music by: Jeff Grace
- Production companies: Glass Eye Pix; RingTheJing Entertainment; Constructovision
- Distributed by: MPI Media Group
- Release dates: April 25, 2009 (Tribeca); October 30, 2009 (United States)
- Running time: 95 minutes
- Country: United States
- Language: English
- Budget: $900,000
- Box office: $101,215

The House of the Devil is a 2009 American horror film written, directed, and edited by Ti West, starring Jocelin Donahue, Tom Noonan, Mary Woronov, Greta Gerwig, A. J. Bowen, and Dee Wallace. The plot concerns a young college student who is hired as a babysitter at an isolated house and is soon caught up in bizarre and dangerous events as she fights for her life.

The film combines elements of both the slasher film and haunted house subgenres while using the "satanic panic" of the 1980s as a central plot element. It pays homage to the style of horror films of the 1970s and 1980s by using filmmaking techniques and technology commonly employed at the time. The opening text claims that the film is based on true events, a practice used in horror films such as The Texas Chain Saw Massacre (1974) and The Amityville Horror (1979).

The House of the Devil had its world premiere at the Tribeca Film Festival on April 25, 2009. It was made available through video on demand on October 1, 2009, and was given a limited theatrical release in the United States on October 30, 2009. It received positive reviews from critics.

== Plot ==
In the 1980s, Samantha Hughes, a cash-strapped college student, responds to an ad for a babysitting job for a Mr. Ulman. Her best friend Megan gives her a ride to the Ulmans' remote mansion. Mr. Ulman reveals the job is actually tending to his wife's mother. Samantha reluctantly agrees to a fee of $400. On the way home, Megan is shot in the head by a stranger, later identified as Victor.

Samantha orders a pizza from a number Mr. Ulman recommended. After accidentally breaking a vase, she cleans up and discovers a closet containing old family photographs. In one photograph, a family that is not the Ulmans stands next to the Volvo that she and Megan saw at the house. Later, three corpses are shown in one of the rooms, implying that they were the family in the photographs and the true owners of the house. Unnerved by the noises in the house and the arrival of the pizza, delivered by Victor, Samantha dials 911, but tells the operator it was an accidental call. Samantha then grabs a knife from the kitchen and goes upstairs to explore the creaking sounds. Drugs in the pizza cause her to pass out just as she sees movement behind a door on the third floor.

Samantha comes to during a lunar eclipse and finds herself bound in the center of a pentagram on the floor. Mr. and Mrs. Ulman, along with their son Victor, begin a ritual. "Mother" is revealed to be a grotesque, witch-like figure. She slices her arm and pours her blood into a goat skull. She then uses it to draw occult symbols on Samantha's belly and forehead, and forces Samantha to drink the blood. Samantha stabs Mother and escapes. After finding Megan's corpse in the kitchen, she kills Victor and Mrs. Ulman, but horrific images of Mother begin appearing in her mind. Mr. Ulman chases her into a nearby cemetery, telling her that she has been chosen and destined to accept "him". Samantha threatens to shoot Ulman, but he is resigned, telling her it is too late. Instead, Samantha shoots herself in the head.

The next day, TV news reports the strange lunar eclipse the night before, which confounded scientists with its abrupt ending. Samantha lies unconscious on a hospital bed having survived her suicide attempt. A nurse states that "both of them" will be fine, implying that she has been impregnated.

== Cast ==
- Jocelin Donahue as Samantha "Sam" Hughes
- Tom Noonan as Mr. Ulman
- Mary Woronov as Mrs. Ulman
- Greta Gerwig as Megan
- A. J. Bowen as Victor Ulman
- Dee Wallace as the landlady
- Danielle Noe as the Mother

Additionally, Lena Dunham voices a 911 operator and writer-director Ti West appears as a teacher.

== Production ==
The film was shot in Connecticut. Taking place in the 1980s, the film was shot on 16 mm film, giving it a retro stylistic look that matched the decade. Similarly, some aspects of the culture of the 1980s—i.e. feathered hair, Samantha's 1980 Sony Walkman, the Fixx's 1983 song "One Thing Leads to Another", the Greg Kihn Band's 1981 song "The Breakup Song (They Don't Write 'Em)", and the Volvo 240 sedan—are seen in the film as signifiers of the decade. The cinematography of the film also reflects the methods used by directors of the time. For instance, West often has the camera zoom in on characters (rather than dolly in as is now common in film), a technique that was often used in horror films of the 1970s and continued to be used into the 1980s. Other stylistic signifiers include opening credits (which became less common in films in the decades after the 1980s) in yellow font, accompanied by freeze-frames, and the closing credits being played over a still image of the final scene.

While filming, the crew stayed at Yankee Pedlar Inn and some of the crew had strange experiences there. The Inn staff believed the location to be haunted and this inspired West to write and direct his next film, The Innkeepers (2011).

== Release ==
The film had its world premiere at the Tribeca Film Festival on April 25, 2009. It was made available through video on demand on October 1, 2009, and was given a limited theatrical release in the United States on October 30, 2009. The DVD and Blu-ray of the film were released on February 2, 2010. A promotional copy of the film was released on VHS in a clamshell box like the ones that many early VHS films of the 1980s came in.

== Soundtrack ==
The soundtrack for The House of the Devil was released in November 2009 as a double feature with the score of I Can See You, both by composer Jeff Grace.

1. Opening – 1:10
2. Family Photos – 2:24
3. The View Upstairs – 1:45
4. Original Inhabitants – 3:05
5. Meeting Mr. Ulman – 1:12
6. Keep the Change – 1:12
7. Footsteps – 1:27
8. Mother – 3:07
9. Chalice – 0:51
10. On the Run – 3:45
11. Lights Out – 3:04
12. He's Calling You – 1:50
13. The House of the Devil – 5:49
14. Mrs. Ulman – 2:04

Tracks from 15 to 26 comprise the soundtrack for I Can See You.

== Reception ==
=== Critical response ===
On the review aggregator website Rotten Tomatoes, the film holds an approval rating of 85% based on 102 reviews, with an average rating of 7.3/10. The website's critic consensus reads, "Though its underlying themes are familiar, House of the Devil effectively sheds the loud and gory cliches of contemporary horror to deliver a tense, slowly building throwback to the fright flicks of decades past." Metacritic, which uses a weighted average, assigned the film a score of 73 out of 100, based on 18 critics, indicating "generally favorable" reviews.

Roger Ebert gave it three out of four stars, complimenting its use of subtlety and tension as being "an introduction for some audience members to the Hitchcockian definition of suspense." Oliver Smith of 7films similarly compared it to staples of the genre, praising that "as the great horror films of past days, such as The Omen or Rosemary's Baby, The House of the Devil is a slow-burning horror film". Kevin Sommerfield from Slasher Studios gave the film four out of four stars, commenting that the film is "not just a nostalgia piece for director Ti West, one of the best horror directors working today", but that it also reflected "how horror movies should be made". Film critic Joe Bob Briggs praised the film as "just a superb slowburn extremely well-crafted movie." In a review for Salon, Stephanie Zacharek indicated that she liked the movie, declaring it "clever" and "somewhat a novelty". Zacharek perceived it as "obviously made with love", though conceding that the film is likely "not going to change the face or direction of horror filmmaking in any drastic way".

Some critics were less kind, critiquing the pacing or originality of the film. Kirk Honeycutt from The Hollywood Reporter judged the film to be derivative, rather than flatteringly imitative, calling the film and its genre "banal".

=== Accolades ===
Award	Year	Category	Recipient	Result	Ref.
Birmingham Sidewalk Moving Picture Festival	2009	Best Feature Film	The House of the Devil	Won	
Chicago International Film Festival	2009	After Dark Competition	The House of the Devil	Nominated	
Screamfest Horror Film Festival	2009	Best Actress	Jocelin Donahue	Won	
Screamfest Horror Film Festival	2009	Best Musical Score	Jeff Grace	Won	
Bucheon International Fantastic Film Festival	2010	Best of Puchon	Ti West	Nominated	
Fangoria Chainsaw Awards	2010	Best Supporting Actor	Tom Noonan	Nominated	
Fangoria Chainsaw Awards	2010	Best Score	Jeff Grace	Nominated	
Independent Spirit Awards	2010	Producers Award	Larry Fessenden (also for I Sell the Dead)	Nominated	
Saturn Awards	2010	Best DVD Release	The House of the Devil	Nominated	

== See also ==
- List of films featuring eclipses
