= James Naughton =

American actor and director (born 1945)

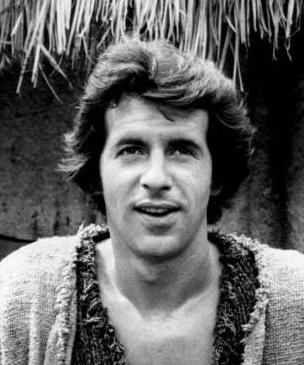
- Naughton on the set of Planet of the Apes in 1974
- Born: December 6, 1945 (age 80); Middletown, Connecticut, U.S.
- Education: Brown University (BA); Yale University (MFA)
- Occupations: Actor; director
- Years active: 1971–present
- Spouse: Pamela Parsons (m. 1967; died 2013)
- Children: 2
- Relatives: David Naughton (brother); Kelli O'Hara (daughter-in-law)

James Naughton (born December 6, 1945) is an American actor and director. He is a two-time winner of the Tony Award for Best Actor in a Musical for his performances as Stone in City of Angels (1990), and Billy Flynn in Chicago (1997). He is one of nine actors to have won the award twice. On television he is best known as astronaut Pete Burke in Planet of the Apes (1974), and as socialite William van der Bilt on Gossip Girl (2009–2012).

== Early life ==
Naughton was born in Middletown, Connecticut, the son of Rosemary (née Walsh) and Joseph Naughton, both of whom were teachers. He is the elder brother of actor David Naughton. His family is Irish American. He graduated from Conard High School. Jim began singing during his years at Conard "with the high school band and at parties."

== Career ==
Naughton graduated from Brown University and Yale School of Drama. His acting career began when he appeared in a series of Broadway dramas and musicals. He has since become an accomplished actor in both starring and supporting film and television roles.

He won the Theatre World Award for his breakthrough off-Broadway performance in Long Day's Journey into Night in 1971. He starred with Geneviève Bujold in Antigone, later made into a film in 1974. He starred in I Love My Wife in 1977 and in Whose Life is it Anyway? in 1980. He won his first Tony Award for Best Actor in a Musical in 1990 for City of Angels. In 1997, he won a second Tony Award with his portrayal of lawyer Billy Flynn in the musical Chicago. He played the role of Willy Brandt in Democracy on its U.S. première in 2004. His films include The Paper Chase and The First Wives Club. In 2006, he appeared in the movie The Devil Wears Prada. In 2006, he played Fuzzy Sedgwick in Factory Girl.

=== Television and commercials ===
On television, he starred in Faraday & Company with Dan Dailey and Sharon Gless (1973–1974). He also starred with Roddy McDowall and Ron Harper in the 1974 television series Planet of the Apes, a spin-off of the original film. He starred in Making the Grade and Trauma Center in the early 1980s. He starred in the short-lived series Raising Miranda in 1988. From 1991 to 1993, he played Lt. Patrick Monahan on the series Brooklyn Bridge. From 1994 to 1995, he co-starred with Bill Cosby in The Cosby Mysteries. He appeared with Gless 20 years later, this time as her husband in Cagney and Lacey: The Return (1993) and Cagney and Lacey: Together Again (1995). He appeared on Damages with Glenn Close. Naughton had a recurring role on Gossip Girl as William van der Bilt, grandfather of main character Nate Archibald. In 1998 he hosted and narrated the Court TV series The Greatest Trials of All Time.

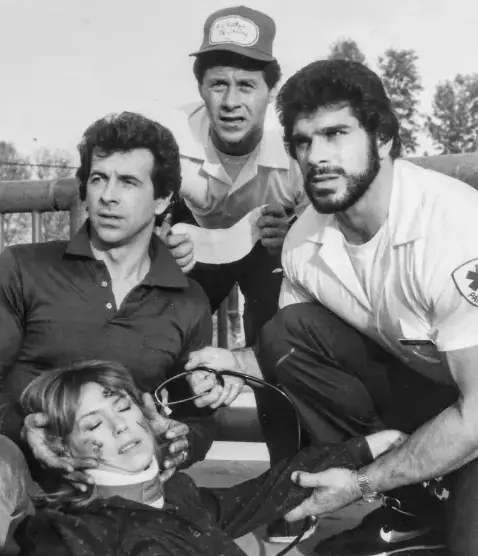
Naughton (left) with Alfie Wise, Lou Ferrigno and Katia Christine in Trauma Center(1983)

He has appeared in television commercials promoting the drugs Cialis, Nexium and Nasalcrom. Naughton has also been the official voice of Audi in the U.S. since 2007, heard in its national TV and radio spots. He is also a frequent narrator on television's Nature series.

=== Director ===
He has directed several plays in New York City, including the 2002 revival of Thornton Wilder's Our Town, starring his friend Paul Newman, filmed for cable TV in 2003. He appears in cabarets in New York City, including Manhattan Theatre Club and Caroline's Comedy Club.

== Personal life ==
His family is Irish American. He and his first wife, Pamela Parsons, have two children: Keira and Greg, both actors. Greg is a founding member of the band The Sweet Remains and is married to Broadway actress Kelli O'Hara. Pamela Parsons died from pancreatic cancer in 2013.

== Stage credits ==
Year	Title	Role	Venue	Notes	Ref.
1971	Long Day's Journey into Night	Edmund Tyrone	Promenade Theatre, New York	Off-Broadway	
1972	Antigone	Haemon			
1977–1979	I Love My Wife	Wally	Ethel Barrymore Theatre, New York	Broadway debut, original cast	
1980	Whose Life is it Anyway?	Dr. David Scott	Royale Theatre, New York	Original Broadway cast	
1989–1990	City of Angels	Stone	Virginia Theatre, New York	Original Broadway cast	
1992	Four Baboons Adoring the Sun	Philip McKenzie	Vivian Beaumont Theater, New York	Original Broadway cast	
1996–1997	Chicago	Billy Flynn	Richard Rodgers Theatre, New York	Original Broadway cast	
1996–1997	Chicago	Billy Flynn	Shubert Theatre, New York	Original Broadway cast	
1999–2000	The Price	–	Royale Theatre, New York	Director, Broadway	
2002–2003	Our Town	–	Booth Theatre, New York	Director, Broadway	
2004	Prymate	Avrum	Longacre Theatre, New York	Original Broadway cast	
2004–2005	Democracy	Willy Brandt	Brooks Atkinson Theatre, New York	Original Broadway cast	

== Filmography ==
Key
†	Denotes films that have not yet been released

=== Film ===
Year	Film	Role	Notes
1973	The Paper Chase	Kevin Brooks	
1976	Second Wind	Roger	
1976	Diary of the Dead	George	
1982	A Stranger Is Watching	Steve Peterson	
1985	Cat's Eye	Hugh	
1987	The Glass Menagerie	The Gentleman Caller (James Delaney "Jim" O'Connor)	
1988	The Good Mother	Brian Dunlop	
1996	First Kid	President Davenport	
1996	The First Wives Club	Gil Griffin	
1996	The Proprietor	New York - Texans	
1999	Oxygen	Clark Hannon	
2000	Labor Pains	Dr. Senior	
2004	Fascination	Patrick Doherty	
2006	The Devil Wears Prada	Stephen	
2006	Factory Girl	Fuzzy Sedgwick	
2007	Suburban Girl	Robert Eisenberg	
2008	Childless	Harvey	
2009	Clear Blue Tuesday	Executive	
2013	The Word	Mike Sheehy	
2016	Equity	John	
2017	Broadway: The Next Generation	Self	Documentary film
2018	The Independents	Officer Sanders	
TBD	Yo Andrea †	Big Dickie	

=== Television ===
Year	Title	Role	Notes	Ref(s)
1971	Great Performances	Haemon	Episode: "Antigone"	
1972	Look Homeward, Angel	Ben Gant	Television film	
1973–1974	Faraday and Company	Steve Faraday	4 episodes	
1974	F. Scott Fitzgerald and 'the Last of the Belles'	Cap. John Haines	Television film	
1974	Mannix	Dr. Hanson	Episode: "A Fine Day for Dying"	
1974	Planet of the Apes	Pete Burke	14 episodes	
1975	The First 36 Hours of Dr. Durant	Dr. Baxter	Television film	
1976	Joe Forrester	Harry	Episode: "Fire Power"	
1976	Barnaby Jones	Dr. Louis Manning	Episode: "Voice in the Night"	
1977	Ryan's Hope	Dr. George Hoyle (uncredited)	Episode: "#1.567"	
1977	On Our Own	Barry Spaulding	Episode: "Julia in the Dark"	
1981	The Bunker	James P. O'Donnell	Television film	
1982	My Body, My Child	Dr. Dan Berensen	Television film	
1982	Parole	Andy Driscoll	Television film	
1982	Making the Grade	Harry Barnes	6 episodes	
1983	The Fall Guy	Cutter	Episode: "Trauma"	
1983	Trauma Center	Dr. Michael "Cutter" Royce	13 episodes	
1984	Last of the Great Survivors	Richard Wylie	Television film	
1985	ABC Weekend Specials	Captain Sawyer	Episode: "The Adventures of Con Sawyer and Hucklemary Finn"	
1985	Who's the Boss?	Michael Bower	4 episodes	
1985	Between the Darkness and the Dawn	Jack Parrish	Television film	
1986	Sin of Innocence	Andy Colleran	Television film	
1987	CBS Summer Playhouse	John Dockery	Episode: "Travelin' Man"	
1988	Blown Away	Rick LaSalle	Television film	
1988	Raising Miranda	Donald Marshak	9 episodes	
1991–1993	Brooklyn Bridge	Lieutenant Patrick Monahan	3 episodes	
1992	Designing Women	Phillip Russell Stuart	Episode: "Screaming Passages"	
1994	The Cosby Mysteries	Adam Sully	Television film	
1994–1995	The Cosby Mysteries	Det. Sully	18 episodes	
1994	The Birds II: Land's End	Frank	Television film	
1994	Couples	Steven	Television film	
1994	Cagney & Lacey: The Return	James Burton	Television film	
1995	Cagney & Lacey: Together Again	James Burton	Television film	
1995	Mixed Blessings	Brad Coleman	Television film	
1996	Law & Order	Barry Taggert	Episode: "Girlfriends"	
1997	Liberty! The American Revolution	Patrick Henry	5 episodes	
1999–2001	Ally McBeal	George McBeal	4 episodes	
2000–2019	Nature	Narrator	3 episodes	
2000	The Truth About Jane	Robert	Television film	
2001	Big Apple	Lawrence Stark	4 episodes	
2002	100 Centre Street	Detective Rowlings	Episode: "End of the Month"	
2002	The Education of Max Bickford	Lyle Dumont	Episode: "Murder of the First"	
2002	Law & Order: Criminal Intent	Dr. Roger Buckman	Episode: "Seizure"	
2005	American Masters	Ernest Hemingway (voice)	Episode: "Ernest Hemingway: Rivers to the Sea"	
2006–2007	Law & Order: Special Victims Unit	Charlie Moss	2 episodes	
2006	Out of Practice	Dr. Jack Arbogast	2 episodes	
2008	Possible Side Effects	Unknown	Television film (unreleased)	
2009–2012	Gossip Girl	William van der Bilt	10 episodes	
2009	Damages	Sam Arsenault	2 episodes	
2009	Warehouse 13	Gilbert Radburn	Episode: "Elements"	
2010	Blue Bloods	Chief Bell	Episode: "What You See"	
2013–2014	Hostages	President Paul Kincaid	9 episodes	
2013	Golden Boy	Marvin Drexler	Episode: "Just Say No"	
2014	Turks & Caicos	Frank Church	Television film	
2015	The Blacklist	Hayworth	Episode: "Ruslan Denisov (No. 67)"	
2015	The Affair	Rodney Callahan	Episode: "#2.9"	
2016–2017	Odd Mom Out	Larry Manassian	2 episodes	
2017	The Tap	Judge Link	Episode: "Pilot"	
2018	The Romanoffs	Dmitri	Episode: "The Royal We"	
2020–2022	The Accidental Wolf	Unknown	Web-series; 5 episodes	
2021–2022	And Just Like That...	Big's Brother	2 episodes	
2023	Command Z	Justice Frank Richardson	Episode: "Preach"	
2023	Three Women	Gay Talese	2 episodes	

== Awards and nominations ==
Year	Award	Category	Nominated work	Result	Ref
1971	Theatre World Awards	Outstanding Debut	Long Day's Journey Into Night	Won	
1990	Drama Desk Awards	Outstanding Actor in a Musical	City of Angels	Won	
1990	Tony Awards	Best Actor in a Musical	City of Angels	Won	
1997	Drama Desk Awards	Outstanding Actor in a Musical	Chicago	Nominated	
1997	Tony Awards	Best Actor in a Musical	Chicago	Won	
