= The Innkeepers (film) =

- Theatrical release poster
- Directed by: Ti West
- Written by: Ti West
- Produced by: Derek Curl; Larry Fessenden; Peter Phok; Ti West
- Starring: Sara Paxton; Pat Healy; Kelly McGillis
- Cinematography: Eliot Rockett
- Edited by: Ti West
- Music by: Jeff Grace
- Production companies: Dark Sky Films; Glass Eye Pix
- Distributed by: Magnet Releasing
- Release dates: March 12, 2011 (SXSW); February 3, 2012 (United States)
- Running time: 101 minutes
- Country: United States
- Language: English
- Budget: $750,000
- Box office: $1.2 million

The Innkeepers is a 2011 American supernatural horror film written, directed, and edited by Ti West. It stars Sara Paxton, Pat Healy, and Kelly McGillis. Its plot follows two employees at the Yankee Pedlar Inn who, during its last weekend of operations, attempt to document the alleged supernatural activity in the building.

== Plot ==
In the final operating week of the Yankee Pedlar Inn, a once-grand hotel, Claire and Luke are the only employees working. Claire, an asthmatic college dropout, and Luke, owner of a website chronicling the hotel's supposed hauntings, are both ghost hunting enthusiasts fascinated by the hotel's "haunted" history. They were especially interested in Madeline O'Malley, a bride who hanged herself when abandoned at the altar, and whose body was hidden in the basement by the hotel owners.

Luke checks in an older woman, whom Claire recognizes as Leanne Rease-Jones, a former actress. While delivering towels to her room, Claire is starstruck and has an awkward encounter with Leanne, who is initially cold toward her. The following night, while taking out the garbage, Claire notices Leanne watching from her room window and waves, but Leanne moves away from the window without acknowledging her. Claire hears noises coming from the hotel's garage, where there is a door leading to the basement. She padlocks the door and returns inside. She uses Luke's ghost-hunting equipment to record EVPs in various places around the hotel. While recording, she hears faint voices and music, and sees the grand piano in the lobby play by itself.

Claire awakens to Madeline's apparition in her room. She later runs into Leanne in the hallway. Leanne reveals she is in town for a psychics' convention, having left her acting career to become a medium. She warns Claire not to go into the basement. Later that day, an elderly man arrives and asks for a honeymoon suite on the third floor, and Claire obliges him.

Luke and Claire investigate the basement. They encounter disembodied voices and other paranormal activity, which scares Luke into leaving the hotel. Panicked, Claire asks Leanne for help. Leanne makes contact with a spirit and tells Claire they need to leave the hotel immediately. Claire rushes upstairs to retrieve the elderly man, only to find a suicide note and discovers his body in the bathtub, his wrists slashed, with Madeline's apparition hanging from a rope. Claire runs downstairs and finds that Luke has returned to the hotel. As Luke goes upstairs to find Leanne, Claire hears noises coming from the basement and approaches the stairwell. Startled by an apparition of the elderly man, she falls down, injuring her head.

Disoriented, Claire walks into the basement room where Madeline's body was kept. She tries in vain to open the door leading to the garage, forgetting she had locked it. Confronted by Madeline's apparition, Claire dies of an asthma attack.

The next morning, Luke tells police he heard Claire's screams coming from the cellar but could not open the door to save her. Luke and Leanne leave with the police. Leanne comforts Luke, saying that Claire couldn't have been saved.

The film ends with a view of Claire's room where her barely visible apparition looks out the window. As she turns towards the viewer, the door slams shut.

== Cast ==
- Sara Paxton as Claire
- Pat Healy as Luke
- Kelly McGillis as Leanne Rease-Jones
- Alison Bartlett as Gayle, the angry mom
- Jake Ryan as Boy
- Lena Dunham as Barista
- George Riddle as Old Man
- Brenda Cooney as Madeline O'Malley
- John Speredakos as Officer Mitchell

== Production ==
While filming The House of the Devil, the crew stayed at Yankee Pedlar Inn and some of the crew had strange experiences there. The Inn staff believed the location to be haunted and this inspired West to write and direct his next film, The Innkeepers.

In January 2010, Ti West was named as the director of the Dark Sky Films project. Sara Paxton, Pat Healy and Kelly McGillis signed on in May 2010. The film is produced by Derek Curl, Larry Fessenden, Ti West and Peter Phok. for Dark Sky Films in partnership with Glass Eye Pix. It was shot in Torrington, Connecticut. West shot several scenes in the actual Yankee Pedlar Inn in Torrington, Connecticut. The film was shot on 35 mm film.

== Soundtrack ==
The score is composed by American musician Jeff Grace.

== Release ==
The film premiered at the South by Southwest (SXSW) festival in March 2011. Dark Sky Films set for a limited theatrical release on February 3, 2012. Ti West narrated and presented his film on the "Get Lit" Winter Party on December 22, 2010, in The Purple Lounge at The Standard Hotel on the Sunset Strip, Hollywood, California.

== Reception ==
On the review aggregator website Rotten Tomatoes, 81% of 118 critics' reviews are positive, with an average rating of 6.7/10. The website's consensus reads: "It doesn't break any rules of the genre, but The Innkeepers serves as additional proof that Ti West is a young director that discriminating horror fans can trust".

Roger Ebert awarded the film a score of three out of four stars, concluding: "Ghost movies like this, depending on imagination and craft, are much more entertaining than movies that scare you by throwing a cat at the camera." David Harley of Bloody Disgusting gave the film a score of three out of five, commending the performances but writing that, "once the tone shifts from light-hearted comedy to balls-to-the-wall horror, it makes the two halves feel like separate films [...] in the end the whole is not as great as the sum of its parts." Peter Bradshaw of The Guardian gave the film two out of five stars, calling it "bafflingly bland and unatmospheric", and writing that it "annoyingly fails to do anything with the kooky situation it elaborately establishes, and there are no real shocks or laughs."

Jeffrey M. Anderson of the San Francisco Examiner selected The Innkeepers as the 8th best film of 2012.
