= Trigger Man (2007 film) =

2007 film by Ti West

- Release poster
- Directed by: Ti West
- Written by: Ti West
- Produced by: Ti West; Peter Phok
- Starring: Reggie Cunningham; Ray Sullivan; Sean Reid; Suyash Pachauri; Heather Robb; James Felix McKenney; Larry Fessenden
- Cinematography: Ti West
- Edited by: Ti West
- Music by: Ti West; Jeff Grace
- Production companies: Glass Eye Pix; ECR Productions
- Distributed by: Cinema Purgatorio
- Release dates: March 12, 2007 (SXSW); October 17, 2007 (United States)
- Running time: 80 minutes
- Country: United States
- Language: English
- Budget: $10,000

Trigger Man is a 2007 American horror thriller film written, directed, produced, and edited by Ti West. It stars Reggie Cunningham, Ray Sullivan, Sean Reid, Heather Robb, James Felix McKenney and Larry Fessenden.

Trigger Man had its world premiere at South by Southwest on March 12, 2007, and was released in the United States on October 17, 2007, by Cinema Purgatorio.

== Premise ==
Three friends from Manhattan are stalked while hunting in rural Delaware.

== Production ==
Filming took place in Wilmington, Delaware.

== Release ==
Trigger Man had its world premiere at South by Southwest on March 12, 2007. It was released in the United States on October 17, 2007, by Cinema Purgatorio.

== Reception ==
On review aggregator Rotten Tomatoes, the film holds an approval rating of 82% based on 11 reviews, with an average rating of 6.7/10.
