= Ti West =

American filmmaker (born 1980)

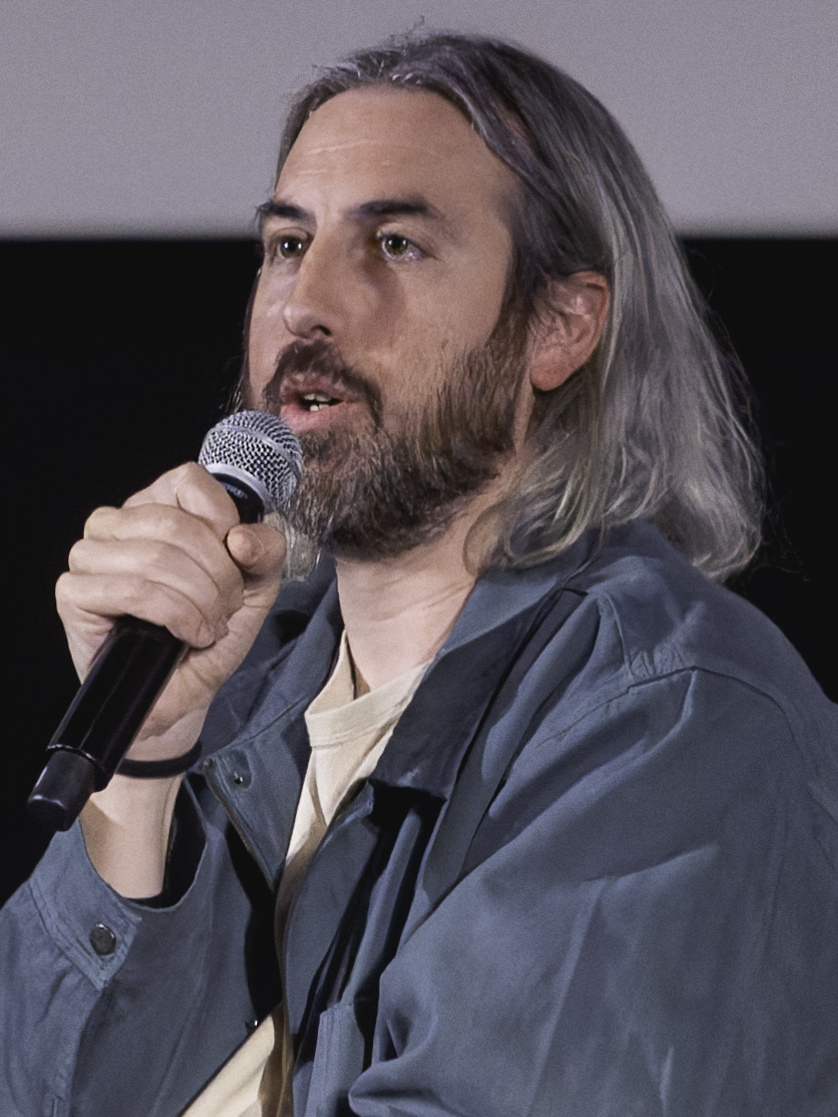
- West in 2024
- Born: Timon C. West; October 5, 1980 (age 46); Wilmington, Delaware, U.S.
- Education: School of Visual Arts
- Occupations: director; writer; producer; editor; cinematographer; actor
- Years active: 2001–present
- Notable work: X
- Spouse: Alison Wonderland (m. 2024)
- Children: 2

Timon C. West (born October 5, 1980) is an American filmmaker and former actor, best known for his work in horror films. He directed the horror films The Roost (2005), Trigger Man (2007), The House of the Devil (2009), The Innkeepers (2011), the Western In a Valley of Violence (2016) as well as the X trilogy. He has also acted in a number of films, mostly in those directed by either himself or Joe Swanberg.

== Early life ==
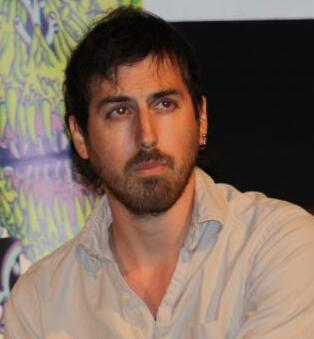
West in 2009

West was born in Wilmington, Delaware, and attended Tatnall School, describing his background as "suburban middle class." His given name Timon is the surname of his maternal grandfather. He was inspired to create films after watching Peter Jackson's Bad Taste and Sam Raimi's Evil Dead. He was featured in a 2001 fall issue of Teen People magazine. West attended the School of Visual Arts. There, one of his professors, screenwriter and director Kelly Reichardt, introduced him to Larry Fessenden, who became his mentor. Fessenden funded West's first two films, The Roost (2005) and Trigger Man (2007).

== Career ==
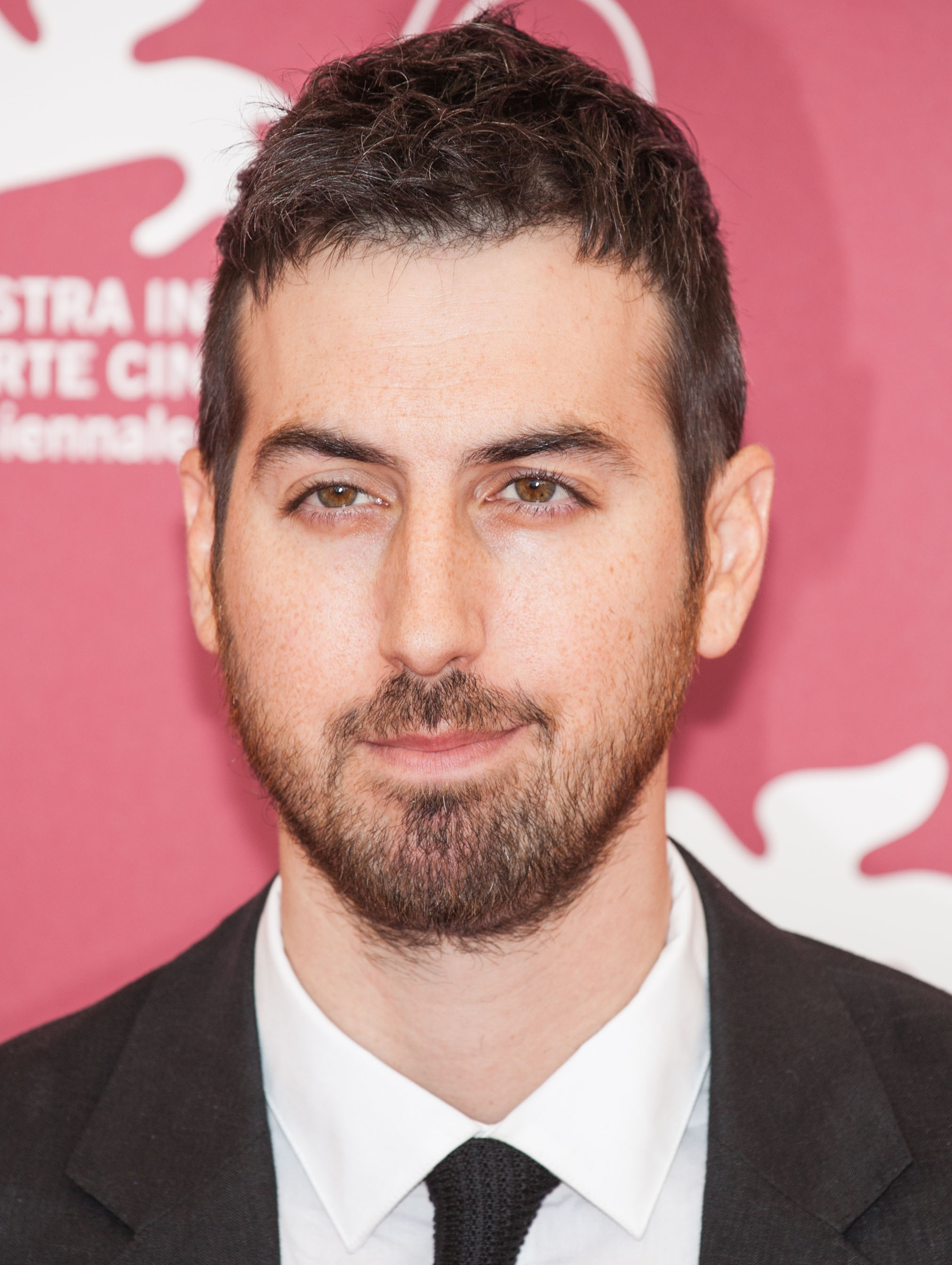
West in 2013

West's early directorial work includes the 2001 short The Wicked, and feature films The Roost (2005), Trigger Man (2007), The House of the Devil (2009), The Innkeepers (2011), and The Sacrament (2013). He appeared in 2004's The Woman Who Split Before Dinner as Old Man Conrad. In 2009, West wrote, produced and directed the web series Dead & Lonely for IFC Films. The first series run ended in October 2009. West disowned the 2009 horror film Cabin Fever 2: Spring Fever, citing massive interference and re-editing as the reasons. He wanted to remove his name completely from the film and give directing credit to Alan Smithee, but his request was denied.

West was set to direct The Haunting in Georgia, the sequel to The Haunting in Connecticut, but left the project in March 2010. In 2012, he worked with Adam Wingard, Simon Barrett, David Bruckner, Joe Swanberg, Glenn McQuaid and the Radio Silence Productions hosts Matt Bettinelli-Olpin and Chad Villella on the anthology horror film V/H/S. He directed the segment "Second Honeymoon".

In June 2015, it was reported that West would direct an episode of MTV's Scream television series. He directed the penultimate episode of the first season, titled "The Dance". He has also directed an episode of Jason Blum and Eli Roth's We TV horror series South of Hell, titled "Take Life Now". West wrote, directed, produced and edited the Western film In a Valley of Violence, starring Ethan Hawke, Taissa Farmiga, and John Travolta. It premiered at South by Southwest in March 2016.

In late 2020, it was announced that A24 would produce a horror film titled X, which would be directed by West and will star Mia Goth, Scott Mescudi, Jenna Ortega, and Brittany Snow. The film was released on March 18, 2022, to critical acclaim. While X was in production, filming in New Zealand was temporarily halted due to the country's lockdown during the COVID-19 pandemic, leading to West spending the time writing a screenplay to a prequel. The film, Pearl, was filmed back-to-back with X once production started up again. Pearl was released in September 2022 to critical acclaim. West later confirmed he was working on a third installment in the series, a sequel to X titled MaXXXine.

West directed the music video to Justin Timberlake’s single "No Angels", which was released March 15, 2024, as the second single from the latter’s sixth studio album Everything I Thought It Was. He also directed the music video for Neverland, a single from Kid Cudi's 2025 album, Free. Cudi had previously appeared in West's 2022 film X.

In October 2025, it was announced West was directing Ebenezer, an adaptation of A Christmas Carol, for Paramount Pictures, with Johnny Depp in the titular role.

== Personal life ==
On Halloween 2024 West married Australian DJ Alison Wonderland in Las Vegas. They have one son.

== Filmography ==
=== Feature film ===
Year	Title	Director	Writer	Producer	Editor	Notes
2005	The Roost	Yes	Yes	No	Yes	Also composer
2007	Trigger Man	Yes	Yes	Yes	Yes	Also cinematographer
2009	The House of the Devil	Yes	Yes	No	Yes	
2009	Cabin Fever 2: Spring Fever	Yes	Story	No	No	
2011	The Innkeepers	Yes	Yes	Yes	Yes	
2013	The Sacrament	Yes	Yes	Yes	Yes	
2016	In a Valley of Violence	Yes	Yes	Yes	Yes	
2022	X	Yes	Yes	Yes	Yes	
2022	Pearl	Yes	Yes	Yes	Yes	
2024	MaXXXine	Yes	Yes	Yes	Yes	
2026	Ebenezer	Yes	No	Executive	Yes	

=== Short film ===
Year	Title	Director	Writer	Producer	Editor	Notes
2001	Prey	Yes	Yes	Yes	Yes	Also cinematographer
2001	Infested	Yes	Yes	Yes	Yes	Also cinematographer
2001	The Wicked	Yes	Yes	Yes	Yes	Also cinematographer
2008	Christmas Decay	Yes	Yes	No	No	Produced for Glass Eye Pix as part of their 2008 Creepy Christmas Online Film Festival
2012	Second Honeymoon	Yes	Yes	Yes	Yes	Segment of V/H/S
2012	M Is for Miscarriage	Yes	Yes	No	No	Segment of The ABCs of Death
2013	Box	Yes	Yes	No	No	Segment of The 3:07 AM Project, a short anthology produced to promote The Conjuring
2022	The Farmer's Daughters	Yes	Yes	Yes	Yes	Chronological compilation of the porn film that was shot in X. Released as an extra on the home media releases of the film.
2026	Remnants	Yes	Yes	Yes	Yes	

=== Television ===
Year	Title	Episode(s)
2015	Scream	"The Dance"
2015	South of Hell	"Take Life Now"
2016	Wayward Pines	"Exit Strategy" and "Bedtime Story"
2017	Outcast	"The Common Good"
2017	The Exorcist	"Unclean"
2019	The Passage	"You Are Not That Girl Anymore"
2019	Chambers	"Bad Inside" and "Heroic Dose"
2019	The Resident	"Belief System"
2019	Soundtrack	"Track 3: Sam and Dante" and "Track 5: Dante and Annette"
2020	Tales from the Loop	"Enemies"
2021, 2024	Them	"Day 7: Night", "Day 10" and "The Box"
2025	Poker Face	"The Day of the Iguana"
2026	Widow's Bay	"Our History"

=== Web ===
Year	Title	Director	Writer	Producer
2009	Dead & Lonely	Yes	Yes	Yes

=== Music video ===
Year	Title	Artist
2024	"No Angels"	Justin Timberlake
2025	"Neverland"	Kid Cudi

=== Acting roles ===
Year	Title	Role	Notes
2004	The Woman Who Spit Before Dinner	Old Man Conrad	Short film
2005	The Roost	Professor	
2009	The House of the Devil	Favorite Teacher	
2009	Birthday Suit		Short film
2011	Silver Bullets	Ben	
2011	Autoerotic		
2011	You're Next	Tariq	
2012	All the Light in the Sky	Director	
2013	Drinking Buddies	Dave	

== Awards and nominations ==
Year	Award	Work	Result	Ref.
2001	NYIIFVF Short Film Award for Best Director – Student Film	The Wicked	Won	
2005	Fangoria Chainsaw Award for Best with Less	The Roost	Nominated	
2009	Best of Puchon	The House of the Devil	Won	
2009	Gold Hugo for After Dark Competition	The House of the Devil	Nominated	
2011	Toronto After Dark Film Festival Fan's Choice Award for Scariest Film	The Innkeepers	Won	
2011	SXSW Spotlight Premiere Audience Award	The Innkeepers	Nominated	
2012	Fright Meter Award for Best Director	The Innkeepers	Nominated	
2012	Gold Hugo for After Dark Competition	The ABCs of Death (shared with Kaare Andrews, et al.)	Nominated	
2012	SXSW Midnight Audience Award	V/H/S (shared with Matt Bettinelli-Olpin, et al.)	Nominated	
2012	Sitges Film Festival Maria Award for Best Motion Picture	V/H/S (shared with Matt Bettinelli-Olpin, et al.)	Nominated	
2013	Gold Hugo for After Dark Competition	The Sacrament	Nominated	
2013	Venice Horizons Award for Best Film	The Sacrament	Nominated	
2014	Fright Meter Award for Best Editing	The Sacrament	Nominated	
2014	Gérardmer Film Festival Syfy Jury Prize	The Sacrament	Won	
2014	Fangoria Chainsaw Award for Best Limited Release/Direct-to-Video Film	The Sacrament	3rd Place	
2015	Fangoria Hall of Fame	Himself	Won	
2022	Sitges Film Festival for Best Director	Pearl	Won	
2022	Bram Stoker Award for Superior Achievement in a Screenplay	Pearl	Nominated	
